= List of Cork Premier Senior Football Championship winners =

This is a list of all teams and players who have won the Cork Senior Football Championship since its inception in 1887.

== By team ==
#	Team	Winner	Winning Years
1	Nemo Rangers	23	1972, 1974, 1975, 1977, 1978, 1981, 1983, 1987, 1988, 1993, 2000, 2001, 2002, 2005, 2006, 2007, 2008, 2010, 2015, 2017, 2019, 2020, 2022
2	Lees	12	1887, 1888, 1896, 1902, 1903, 1904, 1907, 1908, 1911, 1914, 1923, 1955
3	Macroom	10	1909, 1910, 1912, 1913, 1926, 1930, 1931, 1935, 1958, 1962
3	UCC	10	1920, 1927, 1928, 1960, 1963, 1964, 1969, 1973, 1999, 2011
5	Clonakilty	9	1939, 1942, 1943, 1944, 1946, 1947, 1952, 1996, 2009
5	St Finbarr's	9	1956, 1957, 1959, 1976, 1979, 1980, 1982, 1985, 2018
7	Fermoy	7	1895, 1898, 1899, 1900, 1905, 1906, 1945
8	Nils	6	1894, 1901, 1915, 1917, 1924, 1925
8	Beara	6	1932, 1933, 1934, 1940, 1967, 1997
10	St. Nicholas	5	1938, 1941, 1954, 1965, 1966
10	Castlehaven	5	1989, 1994, 2003, 2012, 2013
12	Carbery	4	1937, 1968, 1971, 2004
12	Collins	4	1929, 1949, 1951, 1953
14	Duhallow	3	1936, 1990, 1991
15	Bantry Blues	2	1995, 1998
15	Imokilly	2	1984, 1986
15	Cobh	2	1918, 1919
15	Clondrohid	2	1891, 1892
15	Midleton	2	1889, 1890
20	O'Donovan Rossa	1	1992
20	Muskerry	1	1970
20	Avondhu	1	1961
20	Garda	1	1950
20	Millstreet	1	1948
20	Collegians	1	1916
20	Dohenys	1	1897
20	Dromtarriffe	1	1893
20	Ballincollig	1	2014
20	Carbery Rangers	1	2016

== By year ==
List of Cork Senior Football Championship winners
Year	Team	Players	Ref
1927	UCC	T Nunan, M Lane, D Lynch, J Dalton, J Hurley, D McCarthy, D O'Keeffe, M Donegan, T Hogan, E Callanan, W Fortune, M Paul, P Coughlan, P Sullivan, M Murphy.	
1928	UCC	T Nunan, R Molloy, J O'Regan, M Donegan, M Murphy, P Moynihan, A O'Callaghn, D McCarthy, R Kearney, B Daly, A Henetty, J Hurley, J Foley, E Callanan, J Russell.	
1929	Collins	JJ Hogan, M Jackson, J O'Connell, J Burke, S Maher, T McCormack, H English, J Brady, R Dowling, G Farrell, H Lang, J O'Connor, N Hiliard, P Dwyer, P Fitzgibbon.	
1930	Macroom	D O'Brien (c), D Dennehy, M Murphy, G McNamara, J Fitzgerald, T Murphy, C Foley, P Murphy, T Browne, D McSwiney, J Murray, J Warren, D Downey, S Cronin, J Murphy.	
1931	Macroom	J Casey, T Murray, C Cronin, D Counihan, D Browne, M Murphy, J Fitzgerald, D Downey, W Lynch, J Cronin, G McNamara, T Browne, J Downey, T Murphy, D McSwiney.	
1932	Beara	M Newton, D Shea, P O'Sullivan, Jerh Sheehan, J O'Sullivan, E Power, P Sullivan, J Cummins, Joe Sheehan, D Holland, P Lowney, D O'Sullivan (c), M Duggan, L O'Sullivan, M Walsh,	
1933	Beara	M Newton, D O'Sullivan (c), B Dennehy, D O'Shea, P Leary, P Lowney, J Harrington, P O'Sullivan, M Duggan, Jerh Sheehan, Joe Sheehan, D Holland, M Walsh, J Cummins.	
1934	Beara	M Newton, D O'Sullivan (c), B Dennehy, D O'Shea, Joe Sheehan, P Sullivan, B Murphy, J Harrington, P Houlihan, P Lowney, Jack Sheehan, D Holland, M Duggan, P O'Sullivan, P Leary.	
1935	Macroom	J Casey, T Browne, A Kelleher, T Murphy, D Casey, C Cronin, F Healy, M Corcoran, S Casey, W Lynch, M McNamara, P Reilly, J Murphy, T Healy, J Downey.	
1936	Duhallow West	DJ Cronin, D Coleman, J Cronin, C O'Connell, J Dennehy, M Murphy, J Murphy, D O'Connor, D Murphy, D Harnedy (c), A Barrett, P Neville, DJ Buckley, R Kiely, J Daly.	
1937	Carbery	S Howe, T Murray, T Harrington, J Tisdall, J Keane, J McCarthy, J Young, T Vaughan, T Connolly, D McCarthy, J Cotter (c), J McCarthy, L O'Connell, M Cronin, J Gavin.	
1938	St. Nicholas'	D Creedon, T Kiely, DM Dorgan, P Burke, P O'Donovan, J Lynch, C Buckley, J Sullivan, T Searles, F Holley, R Culhane, J Buckley, D Moylan, R Buckle, C Tobin.	
1939	Clonakilty	H Duggan, C Kiely, J Cahalane, D McCarthy, D Cullinane, P Nyhan, J Sullivan, M Finn, T Crowley, J Regan, T O'Reilly, J Donovan, S Griffin, J Crowley, L Ahern.	
1940	Beara	M Walsh, P Hartnett, B Dennehy, L Lyne, T Downey, T Coughlan, J Harrington, Louis O'Sullivan, Jerh Leary, J Leary, DJ Sullivan, E Brannigan, L O'Sullivan, P Mullen, D O'Sullivan (c).	
1941	St. Nicholas'	N Porter, D Creedon, T Kiely, DJ Buckley, C Buckley, P O'Donovan, P Hogan, J Lynch, J Buckley (c), F Holly, C Tobin, I Buckley, D Moylan, C Sweeney, J Looney.	
1942	Clonakilty		
1943	Clonakilty	M O'Driscoll, C Kiely, J Cahalane, M Finn, P McNamara, T Crowley (c), S O'Donovan, F O'Donovan, J O'Regan, D Cullinane, J Ahern, P Ryan, D Ahern, J Crowley, G O'Neill.	
1944	Clonakilty	M O'Driscoll, C Kiely, J Cahalane, M Finn, P McNamara, T Crowley (c), H O'Neill, F O'Donovan, N O'Neill, D Cullinane, D Rice, S O'Donovan, P Ryan, P Healy, J Crowley.	
1945	Fermoy	D Roche, W McGrath, D Magnier, K Barry, C Power, P Cronin (c), T O'Driscoll, J Clifford, M Hoare, K O'Donovan, D Murray, P Barry, C Murphy, P O'Grady, J Hogan.	
1946	Clonakilty	M O'Driscoll, L Grainger, J Cahalane, M Finn, P Colbert, T Crowley, H O'Neill, F O'Donovan, C O'Neill, D Cullinane (c), P Healy, S O'Donovan, L Ahern, J Crowley, PJ O'Sullivan. Sub: D McCarthy.	
1947	Clonakilty	M O'Driscoll, L Grainger, J Cahalane, M Finn (c), S O'Donovan, T Crowley, H O'Neill, F O'Donovan, C O'Neill, P Healy, J Ahern, L Ahern, J O'Regan, J Crowley, P Holland.	
1948	Millstreet	D Manning, R Barrett, C Dineen, D Driscoll, Jerh O'Keeffe, John O'Keeffe (c), J Kelleher, D Connors, J Manley, JJ Tangney, J O'Connor, D Kelleher, E Singleton, M Byrne, J Weir. Sub: C Dennehy.	
1949	Collins	D O'Keeffe, P Kelly, P Daly, A McDyer, E Egan, P Cronin (c), P Cronin, J Cullinane, John Cronin, J Fitzgibbon, É Young, F Moloney, J Kenny, J Fitzgerald, Lynch: Sub: Moore.	
1950	Garda	C Kearney, J Murphy, J Courtney, J Downing, R O'Connor, P O'Driscoll, A O'Rourke, C McGrath (c), P Brady, P McMahon, M Reddy, P Spillane, D Murray, R Scanlan, E Monohan. Sub: T Lawlor.	
1951	Collins	M Furey, J Ronyane, J O'Boyle, P Kelly, W Dooley, P Cronin (c), J Downey, John Cronin, É Young, J Fitzgibbon, Jimmy Cronin, D O'Keeffe, P Moore, P Mullen, J Kenny. Sub: F Moloney.	
1952	Clonakilty	P Downey, T Crowley, T O'Regan, J O'Brien, S O'Donovan, H O'Neill, M Collins, T Moriarty (c), T Connolly, J O'Donovan, F O'Donovan, M Ryan, D Cullinane, P Healy, J Walsh.	
1953	Collins	D O'Keeffe, J O'Boyle, E Roche, L O'Connor, P Cronin, John Cronin, O Egan, J Downey, N Fitzgerald, J Fitzgibbon, É Young, PJ Kelly, D Madden, Jimmy Cronin, P Kelly. Sub: J Kenny.	
1954	St. Nicholas'	J McCabe, J Lyons (c), G Lenihan, S French, D O'Donovan, V Twomey, G Mulcahy, J Twomey, J Hartnett, D O'Sullivan, J Lynam, V Dorgan, D Creedon, F Daly, C Ring. Sub: J Clifford.	
1955	Lees	P Tyers, D Singleton, D O'Sullivan (c), P O'Sullivan, C Lydon, J Murray, M Lynch, C Duggan, E Boland, P O'Shea, M Cahill, P Murphy, E Donoghue, P. A. Murphy, W McCarthy. Sub: D Hurley.	
1956	St Finbarr's	G McCarthy; M Keating, T Redmond, A O'Sullivan; M Carey, E O'Connell, S Roche; J Driscoll, D Murphy; M McCarthy, P Woods, L McGrath; T Cronin, R Nutty, T O'Shaughnessy. Sub: B Studdert.	
1957	St Finbarr's	G McCarthy; M Keating, M Carey, A O'Sullivan; E O'Connell, D Driscoll, S Roche; D Murphy, B Studdert; M McCarthy, D Hurley, L McGrath; T Cronin, R Nutty, P Lougheed. Subs: T O'Shaughnessy, W Mahony, M McCarthy.	
1958	Macroom	E Murphy; J O'Callaghan, T O'Callaghan, D Murray; S O'Riordan, M Gould (c), E Downey; P O'Sullivan, G O'Shea; J O'Brien, T O'Leary, F McCarthy; D Graham, D Sweeney, H Casey.	
1959	St Finbarr's	G McCarthy; M Keating, T Mullane, A O'Sullivan; M Horgan, D Driscoll, D Hurley (c); E O'Connell, J Driscoll; P Lougheed, S O'Connell, M McCarthy; T Cronin, L McGrath, S Roche. Subs: D McCarthy, D O'Sullivan.	
1960	UCC	T Guerin; B O'Callaghan, G McAuliffe, D Spillane; M Crowley, L Shalloe, E Horan; J Healy, S Sheehy; P Whelan, M O'Sullivan, D Geaney; F Tobin, S Murphy, L Scully. Subs: O Harrington, N Phelan.	
1961	Avondhu	P Clancy; K Curley, T Breen, D O'Keeffe; N Kelly, T Bermingham, J O'Flynn; M Burke, D O'Sullivan; J Lawton, M O'Brien, M Barrett; T O'Brien, N Curley (c), O McAuliffe. Subs: W Hanrahan, E Coughlan, D Whelan, T O'Halloran B Browne P Harrington JJ O'Sullivan.	
1962	Macroom	M Dunphy, J O'Callaghan, T O'Callaghan, D Murray; J O'Donoghue, M Gould, T O'Leary; P O'Sullivan, N Fitzgerald; J O'Brien, E Ryan, O Lynch; J Murphy, H Casey (c), D Graham. Sub: D Murphy.	
1963	UCC	G Lohan; B O'Callaghan, M McCormack, D Spillane; B Kelly, J Blake, S McCarthy; M Fleming, K O'Neill; L Scully (c), D Harnedy, D Philpott; N Phelan, F O'Rourke, O Whitson. Sub: J Harmon.	
1964	UCC	G Lohan; J Blake, M McCormack, V Cronin; T Mulvihill, F O'Reilly, J McCarthy; M Fleming, F Cogan; D Philpott, J O'Halloran, M Kelly; D Harnedy, F O'Rourke, D Geaney. Sub: P Moynihan.	
1965	St. Nicholas'	D O'Donovan; D O'Riordan, M Lane, S McAllen; JJ Kelly, T Corbett, J O'Sullivan; J Daly, D Coughlan; M Coughlan, D O'Driscoll, P Harte; F O'Neill, D Moore, W Carroll.	
1966	St. Nicholas'	D O'Donovan; M Lane, F Buckley, S McAllen; JJ Kelly, T Corbett, M O'Connor; D Coughlan, J O'Sullivan; D Moore, D O'Driscoll, J Daly (c); W Carroll, P Harte, F O'Neill. Sub: C O'Connor.	
1967	Beara	R O'Dwyer; S Power (c), PP O'Sullivan, P O'Shea; KJ O'Sullivan, C Murphy, JL O;Sullivan; J Downing, B O'Neill; P Lyne, P O'Sullivan, M O'Sullivan; J O'Sullivan, Con O'Sullivan, Cormac O'Sullivan.	
1968	Carbery	D Mawe; D Kehilly, F Kehilly (c), T Bermingham; J Crowley, J Young, K Kehilly; D Dineen, R Evans; T Holland, N Kehilly, D Hunt; B Desmond, M Farr, J Carroll.	
1969	UCC	J Carroll; M Morris, M Keane, J Coughlan (c); S Murphy, T Murphy, S Looney; P Doherty, M Power; B Lynch, R Cummins, D Kavanagh; E Philpott, J O'Halloran, C O'Sullivan (c). Sub: P O'Donoghue.	
1970	Muskerry	S O'Mahony; N Cronin, D McCarthy, M Scannell; D Buckley, J Lucey, J Dunlea; J Curtin, D Murphy; G Lynch, C Kelly, M Mehigan; F Cooper, S McCarthy (c), N Dunne. Sub: C Twomey.	
1971	Carbery	D Mawe; D Kehilly, D McCarthy, J Crowley; N Crowley (c), J Young, K Kehilly; B Evans, F Murphy; T Holland, D Hunt, T Murphy; B Desmond, D Barron, J Carroll. Sub: J Gabriel.	
1972	Nemo Rangers	B Morgan (c); J Corcoran, E Brophy, B Murphy; D Cogan, F Cogan, K Collins; B Cogan, D Barrett; D Allen, S Coughlan, L Good; N Morgan, J Barrett, M O'Donoghue.	
1973	UCC	N Murphy; S Kavanagh, S Looney, P O'Shea; N Brosnan, P Lynch, T Looney (c); F Groarke, N O'Sullivan; B Lynch, D Kavanagh, F Dillon; D Murray, D Cotter, S O'Shea. Sub: J McMahon.	
1974	Nemo Rangers	B Morgan (c); J Corcoran, E Brophy, F Cogan; D Cogan, B Murphy, D O'Driscoll; K Collins, M O'Donoghue; B Cogan, S Coughlan, S Leydon; L Good; J Barrett, C Murphy. Sub: N Morgan.	
1975	Nemo Rangers	B Morgan; F Cogan (c), B Murphy, G Weldon; D Linehan, K Murphy, D O'Driscoll; D Cogan, K Collins; J Barrett, S Coughlan, S Leydon; N Morgan, D Allen, C Murphy.	
1976	St Finbarr's	B O'Brien; Donal O'Grady, S Looney, N Ahern; Gerald McCarthy, C Ryan, Des O'Grady; F Twomey, R Kenny; Gerry McCarthy, J Barry-Murphy (c), J O'Callaghan; C Myers, E Fitzpatrick, O McCarthy.	
1977	Nemo Rangers	B Morgan; F Cogan, F Stone, K Murphy; K Collins, B Murphy, D O'Driscoll; D Murphy, K Brady; D Allen, S Coughlan (c), C Murphy; L Good, D Linehan, J Barrett. Sub: D Geary.	
1978	Nemo Rangers	B Morgan; F Cogan, F Stone, K Murphy; J Kerrigan, B Murphy (c), D O'Driscoll; K Brady, D Geary; J Barrett, D Allen, T Dalton; N Morgan, D Linehan, K Collins. Sub: C Murphy.	
1979	St Finbarr's	B O'Brien; Donal O'Grady, M Healy, N Aherne (c); D Brosnan, G Desmond, Des O'Grady; M Lynch, C Ryan; F Twomey, R Kenny, F O'Mahony; J Barry-Murphy, J Allen, G McCarthy. Sub: J Cronin.	
1980	St Finbarr's	B O'Brien; D O'Grady, M Healy, G Desmond; M Carey, C Ryan (c), J Cremin; M Lynch, D Philpott; F O'Mahony, T Holland, D Barry; J O'Callaghan, J Allen, J Barry-Murphy.	
1981	Nemo Rangers	B Morgan; F Cogan, B Murphy, A Keane; J Kerrigan, D Linehan, D O'Driscoll; M Niblock, D Murphy; T Dalton, S Hayes, C Murphy; E Fitzgerald, D Allen, M Dorgan. Subs: T Hennebry, Charlie Murphy.	
1982	St Finbarr's	B O'Brien (c); J Cremin, J Meyler, G Desmond; D Philpott, C Ryan, M Carey; T O'Reilly, T Holland; D Barry, J Barry-Murphy, D Brosnan; J O'Callaghan, J Allen, F O'Mahony. Subs: T Leahy, M Lynch.	
1983	Nemo Rangers	D Bevan; A Keane, B Murphy, K Murphy; J Kerrigan (c), M Lynch, T Nation; T Dalton, T Hennebry; S Coughlan, S Hayes, C Murphy; M Dorgan, D Allen, E Fitzgerald. Sub: D O'Driscoll.	
1984	Imokilly	M Lewis; D Mulcahy, S Bowes, M Walsh; K Murphy, C Counihan (c), M McCarthy; F Quill, T McCarthy; G Glavin, B Lotty, B Ahern; S Hegarty, K Hennessy, T Murphy. Subs: D Walsh, B Óg Murphy.	
1985	St Finbarr's	J Kerins; J Cremin, J Meyler (c), K Scanlon; M Casey, G Desmond, D Philpott; P Hayes, C Ryan; B Searles, D Barry, M Slocum; J Barry-Murphy, D O'Mahony, T Leahy. Subs: K McCarthy, R Kenny.	
1986	Imokilly	N Murphy; J Murphy, S Bowes, M Walsh; K Murphy, C Counihan, M McCarthy; M Spillane, T McCarthy; J Hegarty, D Walsh, B Aherne; T Murphy, M Hennessy, R Swaine. Subs: B Lotty, F Quill, B Óg Murphy.	
1987	Nemo Rangers	B Morgan; M Fitzgerald, R O'Leary, M Lynch; J Kerrigan, N Creedon, D Creedon; T Dalton (c), S Fahy; C Murphy, S O'Brien, T Nation; M Dorgan, D Allen, E Fitzgerald.	
1988	Nemo Rangers	J O'Mahony; A Keane, N Creedon, M Lynch; J Kerrigan, S O'Brien, D Creedon; S Fahy, T Dalton; P O'Donovan, E O'Mahony, T Nation; M Dorgan, D Allen, E Fitzgerald (c). Sub: S Calnan.	
1989	Castlehaven	J Maguire; M Maguire, N Cahalane, D Cleary; M O'Brien, N Cahalane, P Cahalane; D O'Regan, L Tompkins (c); J Nolan, MC O'Mahony, F Collins; M O'Mahony, J Cleary, TJ O'Regan. Sub: J Cahalane.	
1990	Duhallow	JP O'Leary; M Angland, S Culloty, N Kelleher; L Dennehy, D O'Connor, B O'Connor; D Culloty (c), J Walsh; J Dennehy, R Dennehy, T Healy; D O'Connor, N O'Connor, A Barry. Sub: N Moynihan.	
1991	Duhallow	JP O'Leary; M Angland, S Culloty, N Kelleher; L Dennehy, J Walsh, B O'Connor; D Culloty (c), P Mahoney; J Casey, A Barry, J Dennehy; N O'Connor, J Murphy, D O'Connor. Sub: R Dennehy.	
1992	O'Donovan Rossa	K O'Dwyer; J Evans, J O'Donovan, F McCarthy; G O'Driscoll, T Davis, I Breen; D O'Driscoll, B O'Donovan; P Davis, J O'Driscoll, D Davis; J Brady, M McCarthy (c), N Murphy: Sub: B Carmody.	
1993	Nemo Rangers	D Bevan: J Kerrigan, N Creedon, P Dorgan; K Cowhie, T Griffin, T Nation; S Fahy, S O'Brien (c); J Kavanagh, T Dalton, S Calnan; P Lambert, E Fitzgerald, C Corkery. Subs: L Kavanagh, P O'Donovan, N Corkery.	
1994	Castlehaven	M Maguire; D Cleary, D McCarthy, D Cahalane; M O'Brien, B Collins, L O'Connell; N Cahalane (c), D O'Sullivan; J Maguire, MC O'Mahony, F Cahalane; E Cleary, L Tompkins, M O'Mahony. Subs: P Cahalane, J Cleary.	
1995	Bantry Blues	D McAuley; E McCarthy, M O'Connor, T O'Mahony; P O'Regan, S Moloney, N Twomey; D O'Neill (c), M Moran; S McCarthy, P Goggin, G Barry; K Harrington, S Dineen, P O'Rourke. Subs: L O'Brien, P Healy.	
1996	Clonakilty	J O'Reilly; W Griffin, D Cahill, B Murphy (c); P Barrett, E Walsh, Pat Griffin; B Crowley, T Mannix; B Walsh, M O'Donovan, Pádraigh Griffin; K Meade, T Dillon, E O'Mahony.	
1997	Beara	P Crowley; PB O'Sullivan, D Wiseman, S Walsh; N Harrington, C O'Sullivan, O O'Sullivan (c); P Hanley, S Harrington; S Spencer, A O'Regan, M Harrington; N Murphy, R O'Dwyer, BJ O'Sullivan. Subs: T O'Shea, S Deane.	
1998	Bantry Blues	D McAuley; N Twomey, M O'Connor, E McCarthy; G Canty, P O'Regan, E Sheehan; D O'Neill (c), M Moran; S McCarthy, S Dineen, P O'Rourke; P Clifford, J Canty, D O'Shea. Sub: A O'Shea.	
1999	UCC	A Quirke; C Breathnach, F Kelleher, S Mac Síthigh; P Galvin, É Fitzmaurice, D Reidy; M Ó Sé, E Hanrahan; L Murphy, M Ó Cróinín (c), G Stack; MD Cahill, B Sheehan, I Twiss. Sub: S Downey.	
2000	Nemo Rangers	D Heaphy; L Kavanagh (c), N Geary, D Creedon; K Connolly, S O'Brien, M Cronin; K Cahill, D Kavanagh; Seán O'Brien, J Kavanagh, D Niblock, W Morgan, C Corkery, A Cronin. Subs: I Gibbons, N Corkery.	
2001	Nemo Rangers	D Heaphy; L Kavanagh, N Geary, I Gibbons; G Murphy, S O'Brien, M Cronin; K Cahill, D Kavanagh; D Mehigan, JP O'Neill, M McCarthy; A Cronin, C Corkery (c), N Corkery. Subs: Seán O'Brien; D Niblock; M Daly; L O'Sullivan; A Morgan.	
2002	Nemo Rangers	D Heaphy; L Kavanagh, N Geary, B O'Regan; G Murphy, M Daly, M Cronin; K Cahill, D Kavanagh; A Cronin, S O'Brien, M McCarthy, J Kavanagh, C Corkery (c), A Morgan. Subs: Seán O'Brien, W Morgan, D Mehigan. JP O'Neill, L O'Sullivan.	
2003	Castlehaven	L Miles; D Cahalane, L Collins (c), A Sheehy; P Loughnane, R Cahalane, T O'Leary; D Hurley, N Cahalane; S Connolly, A Crowley, F Cahalane; C Crowley, Bernie Collins, P Hurley. Subs: D Burns, B Deasy, Brian Collins.	
2004	Carbery	P Prendergast; E Barrett, O Sexton, E Murphy; B O'Brien, S Levis, M Fehily; M O'Sullivan, K McMahon; A O'Connor, J Hayes, F Arundel; D Hayes, P Hegarty M Moore. Subs: M Cronin, K Walsh, B Harte, A O'Leary, M Milner.	
2005	Nemo Rangers	D Heaphy; G Murphy, N Geary, G O'Shea; B O'Regan, D Kavanagh, C O'Shea; M Cronin (c), M McCarthy; D Niblock, A Cronin, J Kavanagh; W Morgan, S O'Brien, J Masters. Subs: P Kerrigan, A Morgan, C Corkery, L O'Sullivan, M Kearney.	
2006	Nemo Rangers	D Heaphy; C O'Shea, N Geary, P Brophy; B Twomey, D Kavanagh, G Murphy; D Mehigan, M Cronin (c); R Kenny, A Cronin, D Niblock; J Masters; S O'Brien, A Morgan. Subs: M McCarthy, P Kerrigan, G O’Shea, J Kerins.	
2007	Nemo Rangers	B Morgan; N Geary, D Kavanagh, B O'Regan; G Murphy, G O'Shea, C O'Brien; M Cronin, M McCarthy; A Cronin, D Niblock, S O'Brien; P Kerrigan, J Masters, D Kearney. Subs: P Morgan, D Mehigan; M Daly.	
2008	Nemo Rangers	B Morgan; N Geary, D Kavanagh, S McKeown; M Cronin, B O'Regan, C O’Brien; D Niblock, M McCarthy (c); S O’Brien, J Masters, A Cronin; B O’Driscoll, A Morgan, P Kerrigan. Subs: D Mehigan, D Kearney, B Twomey, S Twomey, P Brophy.	
2009	Clonakilty	E Harte; Tony Anglin, D O'Brien, T O'Sullivan; D Murphy, N Griffin, N Hayes; S Nagle, Timmy Anglin (c); D Lyons, M O'Brien, C O'Donovan; C Callanan, C McManus, P Griffin. Subs: D O'Regan, H Kenny.	
2010	Nemo Rangers	B Morgan (c); D Breen, D Kavanagh, C O’Shea; C O’Brien, B O’Regan, A O’Reilly; P Morgan, D Niblock; P Kerrigan, A Cronin, W Morgan; B O’Driscoll, S O’Brien, D Kearney. Subs: M Cronin, J Masters, D Mehigan, A Morgan, B Twomey.	
2011	UCC	S Mellet; M Hickey, P Crowley, M Galvin; T Clancy, N Daly, S Kiely (c); J Buckley, W Kennedy; M Griffin, S Beston, JP Spillane; S O’Brien, D Casey, P Geaney. Subs: J O’Sullivan, B Coughlan, G O’Grady.	
2012	Castlehaven	P Hurley; D Limrick, L Collins, T O’Leary; R Whelton, D Cahalane, C Hayes; S Dineen, D Hurley; Stephen Hurley, M Collins, A Cahalane; S Cahalane (c), D Burns, B Hurley. Subs: M Cahalane, Shane Hurley, S Nolan.	
2013	Castlehaven	P Hurley; T O’Leary, D Limrick, L Collins; R Whelton, D Cahalane, C Hayes; S Dineen, D Hurley; E Dennehy, Stephen Hurley, M Collins; S Nolan, S Cahalane (c), B Hurley. Subs: M Hurley, D Hegarty, S Hurley, S Collins.	
2014	Ballincollig	D Lordan (c); L Prendergast, L Jennings, N Galvin; JP Murphy, S O'Donoghue, C Kiely; S Kiely, C O'Sullivan; N Allen, P Kelly, G Durrant; J Kelly, C Dorgan, J Miskella. Subs: A Donovan, I Coughlan, S Kiely, R Noonan.	
2015	Nemo Rangers	MA Martin; A Cronin, A O’Reilly, C O’Shea; K Fulignati, T Ó Sé, A O’Donovan; D Niblock, M Dorgan; D Mehigan, B O’Driscoll, P Kerrigan (c); C Horgan, L Connolly, C O’Brien. Subs: C Dalton, J Masters, P Morgan.	
2016	Carbery Rangers	P Shanahan, M Kelly, T O’Rourke, P Hodnett, J O’Riordan, R Kiely, J Fitzpatrick (c), B Shanahan, K McMahon, A Jennings, C O’Donovan, B Hodnett, J O’Rourke, S Hayes, J Hayes. Subs: D Hayes, M O’Donovan, C O’Rourke, M Mennis, K Fitzpatrick, S Murray.	
2017	Nemo Rangers	MA Martin; A O’Reilly (c), A Cronin, C McWhinney, T Ó Sé, S Cronin, K Fulignati; A O’Donovan, J Horgan; B O’Driscoll, P Kerrigan, C O’Brien; L Connolly, P Gumley, C Dalton. Subs: K O’Donovan, J O’Donovan, A Greaney, M Dorgan, C Horgan.	
2018	St Finbarr's	J Kerins; C Dennehy, J Burns, D Quinn; C Lyons, A O’Connor, C Scully; I Maguire (c), E Comyns; D O’Brien, M Shields, E Dennehy; C Keane, E McGreevey, S Sherlock. Subs: G O’Connor, E Finn, C Barrett, R O’Dwyer, R O’Mahony.	
2019	Nemo Rangers	MA Martin; A Cronin, A O’Reilly, B Murphy; K O’Donovan, S Cronin, J Horgan; A O’Donovan, J McDermott; B O’Driscoll (c), P Kerrigan, C O’Brien; M Cronin, L Connolly, C Horgan. Subs: C Dalton, P Morgan, R Dalton.	
2020	Nemo Rangers	MA Martin (c); K Histon, K O’Donovan, B Murphy; A Cronin, S Cronin, J Horgan; A O’Donovan, B Cripps; C O’Brien, R Dalton, L Connolly; M Cronin, P Kerrigan, C Horgan. Subs C Dalton, J McDermott, B O’Driscoll, A O’Reilly, K Fulignati.	
2021	St Finbarr's	J Kerins; S Ryan, J Burns, C Scully; C Lyons, B Hennessy, A O'Connor; I Maguire (c), B Hayes; D O'Brien, C McCrickard, C Barrett; E Comyns, S Sherlock, E Dennehy. Subs: C Myers-Murray, M Shields, E McGreevey, B O'Connell, A Lynne.	
2022	Nemo Rangers	MA Martin; K Histon, B Murphy, K O’Donovan; C McCartan, S Cronin, K Fulgnati; B Cripps, A O’Donovan; C Horgan, R Dalton, J Horgan; M Cronin, B O’Driscoll, L Connolly (c). Subs: P Kerrigan, L Horgan, C Dalton, K O’Sullivan, C O’Donovan.	
