= Dessie Cullinane =

Irish Gaelic footballer

Personal information
- Native name: Deasún Ó Cuileannáin (Irish)
- Born: 2 August 1919 Clonakilty, County Cork, Ireland
- Died: 21 March 1990 (aged 70) Clonakilty, County Cork, Ireland

Sport
- Sport: Gaelic football
- Position: Left corner-back
Club
- Years: Club
- 1936-1954: Clonakilty
Club titles
- Cork titles: 7
Inter-county
Years	County	Apps (scores)
1938-1947	Cork	2 (0-03)
Inter-county titles
- Munster titles: 1
- All-Irelands: 1
- NFL: 0

Desmond James Cullinane (2 August 1919 – 21 March 1990) was an Irish Gaelic footballer who played for club side Clonakilty and at inter-county level with the Cork senior football team.

== Playing career ==
Cullinane was just 16-years-old when he made his debut with the Clonakilty senior team in 1936. It was the first of 18 successive years with the team, during which time he won seven County Championship titles during a golden age for the club. Cullinane made his first appearance for the Cork senior football team during the National League in 1938, before later captaining the county's junior team that won the Munster Championship in 1940. He returned to the senior team as captain during the opening round of the 1945 Munster Championship, however, he was later dropped from the starting fifteen and the captaincy was handed to Tadhgo Crowley. In spite of this, Cullinane won a Munster Championship title from the bench before ending the season by again lining out as a substitute when Cork claimed the All-Ireland title after a defeat of Cavan in the final.

== Death ==
Cullinane died after a long period of ill health on 21 March 1990.

== Honours ==
Clonakilty

- Cork Senior Football Championship: 1939, 1942, 1943, 1944, 1946 (c), 1947, 1952

Cork

- All-Ireland Senior Football Championship: 1945
- Munster Senior Football Championship: 1945
- Munster Junior Football Championship: 1940 (c)

Sporting positions
Preceded by Mick Finn	Cork Senior Football Captain; 1945	Succeeded by Tadhgo Crowley
