= Mick Finn (Gaelic footballer) =

Cork Gaelic footballer

Personal information
- Native name: Mícheál Ó Finn (Irish)
- Born: 3 February 1915 Barryroe, County Cork, Ireland
- Died: 9 November 1987 (aged 72) Clonakilty, County Cork, Ireland
- Occupation: Publican

Sport
- Sport: Gaelic football
- Position: Left corner-back
Club
- Years: Club
- 1935–1955: Clonakilty
Club titles
- Cork titles: 6
Inter-county
Years	County	Apps (scores)
1937–1945	Cork	7 (0–0)
Inter-county titles
- Munster titles: 2
- All-Irelands: 1
- NFL: 0

Michael Finn (3 February 1915 – 9 November 1987) was an Irish Gaelic footballer and hurler who played for club sides Barryroe, Kilbrittain and Clonakilty, at divisional level with Carbery and at inter-county level with the Cork senior football team.

== Playing career ==
Finn's career began with the Barryroe club where he played both Gaelic football and hurling. As a boarder at St. Augustine's College he expanded on his sporting exploits, winning a Munster schoolboys' cap for rugby and remaining unbeaten in handball in Munster for four years. On returning home, Finn played with Darrara Agricultural College before joining the Clonakilty club in 1935. In a 20-year career with "Clon", he won six County Championship titles, including one as captain in 1947. As a hurler of note, he won a total of seven divisional championship medals with Clonakilty and Kilbrittain. Finn's inter-county career began with the Cork junior football team in 1935 before joining the senior side two years later. He won his first Munster Championship title in 1943. Finn claimed a second provincial winners' medal in 1945 before ending the season by being a substitute when Cork claimed the All-Ireland title after a defeat of Cavan in the final. His inter-county career ended shortly after, however, he continued to line out at club level with the Clonakilty junior team until 1955.

== Personal life and death ==
Finn spent the majority of his life working as a publican in Clonakilty. He died after a long period of ill health on 9 November 1987.

== Honours ==
Clonakilty

- Cork Senior Football Championship: 1939, 1942, 1943, 1944, 1946, 1947 (c)

Cork

- All-Ireland Senior Football Championship: 1945
- Munster Senior Football Championship: 1943, 1945

Sporting positions
Preceded by	Cork Senior Football Captain; 1940	Succeeded by
Preceded by Tadhgo Crowley	Cork Senior Football Captain; 1944	Succeeded by Dessie Cullinane
