= Moll O'Driscoll =

Irish Gaelic footballer

Michael "Moll" O'Driscoll
Personal information
- Native name: Mícheál Ó Drisceoil (Irish)
- Nickname: Moll
- Born: 1922 Clonakilty, County Cork, Ireland
- Died: January 1988 (aged 65) Cricklewood, London, England
- Occupation: Builder
- Height: 5 ft 9 in (175 cm)

Sport
- Sport: Gaelic football
- Position: Goalkeeper
Club
- Years: Club
- Clonakilty
Club titles
- Cork titles: 5
Inter-county
Years	County	Apps (scores)
1945-1951	Cork	15 (0-00)
Inter-county titles
- Munster titles: 2
- All-Irelands: 1
- NFL: 0

Michael O'Driscoll (1922 – February 1988), known as Moll O'Driscoll was an Irish Gaelic footballer who played for club side Clonakilty and at inter-county level with the Cork senior football team.

== Career ==
O'Driscoll first came to Gaelic football prominence on the Clonakilty team that contested six consecutive county finals from 1942 to 1947. He ended up on the winning side on five occasions. O'Driscoll's performances at club level saw him take over from Dave Roche as first-choice goalkeeper with the Cork senior football team for the opening round of the 1945 Munster Championship. He later won his first Munster Championship title before ending the season by again lining out in goal when Cork claimed the All-Ireland title after a defeat of Cavan in the final. O'Driscoll claimed a second provincial winners' medal in 1949. He was also a regular on the Munster team and won a Railway Cup medal in 1949.

== Personal life and death ==
Born in Clonakilty, County Cork, O'Driscoll emigrated to England in the early 1950s. He settled in Cricklewood in North London and found employment with building firm Holland, Hannen & Cubitts. O'Driscoll died in January 1988.

== Honours ==
Clonakilty

- Cork Senior Football Championship: 1942, 1943, 1944, 1946, 1947

Cork

- All-Ireland Senior Football Championship: 1945
- Munster Senior Football Championship: 1945, 1949

Munster

- Railway Cup: 1949
