= Humphrey O'Neill =

Irish Gaelic footballer

Personal information
- Native name: Amhlaoibh Ó Néill (Irish)
- Nickname: Small
- Born: 2 March 1925 Clonakilty, County Cork, Ireland
- Died: 9 February 1976 (aged 50) St Stephen's Green, Dublin, Ireland
- Occupation: Wholesaler
- Height: 5 ft 9 in (175 cm)

Sport
- Sport: Gaelic football
- Position: Left wing-back
Clubs
- Years: Club
- Clonakilty; University College Cork
Club titles
- Cork titles: 4
College
- Years: College
- University College Cork
College titles
- Sigerson titles: 0
Inter-county
Years	County	Apps (scores)
1945-1953	Cork	12 (0-02)
Inter-county titles
- Munster titles: 2
- All-Irelands: 1
- NFL: 0

Humphrey Patrick O'Neill (2 March 1925 - 9 February 1976) was an Irish Gaelic footballer who played for club sides Clonakilty, University College Cork and at inter-county level with the Cork senior football team.

== Career ==
O'Neill first came to Gaelic football prominence as a member of the Clonakilty club that was enjoying a golden age in terms of success. He became a regular member of the club's senior team in 1944 and won four County Championship titles in nine seasons. O'Neill was drafted onto the Cork senior football team for the 1945 Munster final, a decision which was criticised due to his relative youth and inexperience, however, he ended the game with his first winners' medal. He ended the season by lining out at centre-forward when Cork claimed the All-Ireland title after a defeat of Cavan in the final. O'Neill won a second Munster Championship medal as a substitute in 1949. He returned to the team for one final season as captain in 1953.

== Personal life and death ==
O'Neill married Catherine M. "Ina" Sheehy in Cork in 1951. The couple later relocated to Ballsbridge in Dublin and had six children. His nephew, Dave McCarthy, won an All-Ireland medal with Cork in 1973. O'Neill died after a brief period of illness at Mercer's Hospital on 9 February 1976, at the age of 50.

== Honours ==
Clonakilty

- Cork Senior Football Championship: 1944, 1946, 1947, 1952

Cork

- All-Ireland Senior Football Championship: 1945
- Munster Senior Football Championship: 1945, 1949

Sporting positions
Preceded by Éamonn Young	Cork senior football team captain 1953	Succeeded by Niall FitzGerald
