= 2016 All-Ireland Under-21 Football Championship =

Gaelic football competition

Championship details
- Dates: 24 February – 30 April 2016
- Teams: 31

All-Ireland Champions
- Winning team: Mayo (5th win)
- Captain: Stephen Coen
- Manager: Mike Solan

All-Ireland Finalists
- Losing team: Cork
- Captain: Stephen Cronin
- Manager: Seán Hayes

Provincial Champions
- Munster: Cork
- Leinster: Dublin
- Ulster: Monaghan
- Connacht: Mayo

Championship statistics
- Player of the Year: Diarmuid O'Connor

The 2016 All-Ireland Under 21 Football Championship is an inter county football competition between 31 of the 32 counties of Ireland (Kilkenny did not participate). Provincial championships were held in Connacht, Leinster, Munster and Ulster with the winners progressing to the All-Ireland semi-finals.

The competition was sponsored for the second time by EirGrid.

== 2016 Connacht Under-21 Football Championship ==
=== Quarter-final ===
- Roscommon 1-16 Galway 2-10 Kiltoom

=== Semi-finals ===
- Roscommon 1-18 Sligo 0-8 Markievicz Park
- Mayo 4-12 Leitrim 0-15 Carrick-on-Shannon

=== Final ===
2 April 2016; 19:30; Final	Mayo	1-11 - 1-10	Rocommon	Markievicz Park; Referee: James Molloy (Galway); Man of the Match: Diarmuid Murtagh
2 April 2016; 19:30; Final	Liam Irwin 1-3 (0-2f, 1 '45), Conor Loftus 0-3f, Fionan Duffy 0-2, Fergal Boland, Brian Reape, Michael Plunkett 0-1 each	Report	Diarmuid Murtagh 1-4 (0-2f), Ronan Daly 0-3, Brian Stack, Henry Walsh, Ultan Harney 0-1 each	Markievicz Park; Referee: James Molloy (Galway); Man of the Match: Diarmuid Murtagh

== 2016 Leinster Under-21 Football Championship ==
=== Preliminary round ===
- Wicklow 5-12 Carlow 3-13 IT Carlow
- Laois 3-15 Louth 1-14 Haggardstown
- Wexford 0-14 Longford 2-5 Enniscorthy

=== Quarter-finals ===
- Dublin 1-12 Meath 0-9 Parnell Park
- Kildare 2-14 Offaly 1-6 Hawkfield
- Wexford 0-7 Westmeath 1-5 Enniscorthy
- Laois 0-20 Wicklow 3-9 O'Moore Park

=== Semi-finals ===
16 March 2016; 7:00 pm Semi-final	Kildare	1-16 - 1-3	Westmeath	O'Moore Park; Referee: Stephen Murphy (Louth)
16 March 2016; 7:00 pm Semi-final	Neil Flynn 1-5 (1-0 pen, 0-4f), Ben McCormack 0-4, Con Kavanagh and Chris Healy 0-3 each, Cian McMonagle 0-1	Report	Jack Quinn 1-0, Robert Hickey (0-1f), Paddy Fagan, Darren Giles 0-1 each	O'Moore Park; Referee: Stephen Murphy (Louth)

19 March 2016; 7:00 pm Semi-final	Dublin	2-17 - 2-5	Laois	Parnell Park; Referee: Fergal Smyth (Offaly)
19 March 2016; 7:00 pm Semi-final	Colm Basquel 1-3, Con O'Callaghan 0-5 (0-2f), Chris Sallier 1-1, Glenn O’Reilly 0-3, Martin Cahilan 0-2, Lorcan Molloy (1 '45), Sean McMahon, Michael Deegan 0-1 each	Report	Evan O’Carroll 1-2 (0-1f), Tom Shiel 1-1, Nigel Murphy and Michael Keogh 0-1 each.	Parnell Park; Referee: Fergal Smyth (Offaly)

=== Final ===
2 April 2016; 19:30; Final	Dublin	2-14 - 0-17 AET	Kildare	Páirc Tailteann; Referee: John Hickey (Carlow); Man of the Match: Con O'Callaghan (Cuala)
2 April 2016; 19:30; Final	Con O’Callaghan 1-7 (0-4f), Cillian O’Shea 1-0, Glenn O’Reilly 0-2, Martin Cahilan, Andrew Foley (0-1f), Brian Howard, Chris Sallier, Colm Basquel 0-1 each	Report	Neil Flynn 0-10 (0-5f, 0-1 ’45), Ben McCormack 0-5, Paschal Connell, Chris Healy 0-1 each	Páirc Tailteann; Referee: John Hickey (Carlow); Man of the Match: Con O'Callaghan (Cuala)

== 2016 Munster Under-21 Football Championship ==
=== Quarter-finals ===
- Cork 0-23 Clare 0-8 Cooraclare
- Kerry 0-11 Tipperary 1-7 Austin Stack Park, Tralee

=== Semi-finals ===
16 March 2016; 7:00 pm Semi-final	Cork	3-18 - 0-2	Waterford	Fraher Field; Referee: Seamus Mulvihill (Kerry)
16 March 2016; 7:00 pm Semi-final	Brian Coakley 1-4 (0-2f), Michael Hurley 1-3, Don O’Driscoll 1-2, Stephen Sherlock 0-3 (0-1f), Sean O’Donoghue 0-2, Mick Dineen, Cian Dorgan, Peter Kelleher, Ryan Harkin 0-1 each	Report	Jason Curry 0-2 (0-1f)	Fraher Field; Referee: Seamus Mulvihill (Kerry)

19 March 2016; 7:00 pm Semi-final	Kerry	1-14 - 2-8	Limerick	Austin Stack Park; Referee: Alan Kissane (Waterford)
19 March 2016; 7:00 pm Semi-final	Jack Savage (0-3f) and Killian Spillane 0-5 each, Tony Brosnan 1-1, Jordan Kiely 0-2, Barry O’Sullivan 0-1	Report	Hugh Bourke 0-6 (0-5f), Brian Fanning 1-1, Killian Ryan 1-0, Brian Donovan 0-1	Austin Stack Park; Referee: Alan Kissane (Waterford)

=== Final ===
7 April 2016; 19:30; Final	Cork	3-9 - 1-14	Kerry	Austin Stack Park; Referee: Sean Lonergan (Tipperary); Man of the Match: Sean White
7 April 2016; 19:30; Final	Brian Coakley 1-2 (0-1f), Sean White and Sean Powter 1-0 each, Ryan Harkin 0-2, Michael Hurley, Sean O’Donoghue (0-1f), Peter Kelleher, Stephen Sherlock (0-1f), Cian Dorgan 0-1 each	Report	Jack Savage 0-7 (0-4f), Mark O’Connor 1-0, Dara Roche and Killian Spillane 0-2, Brian O Seanachain, Micheal Burns, Eanna O Conchuir, Tony Brosnan 0-1 each	Austin Stack Park; Referee: Sean Lonergan (Tipperary); Man of the Match: Sean White

== 2016 Ulster Under-21 Football Championship ==
=== Preliminary round ===
- Derry 0-16 Antrim 0-11 Celtic Park

=== Quarter-finals ===
- Monaghan 1-15 Fermanagh 0-3 Iniskeen
- Down 0-9 Armagh 5-16 Pairc Esler
- Cavan 0-10 Tyrone 2-10 Breffni Park
- Donegal 0-14 Derry 2-7 Ballybofey

=== Semi-finals ===
- Monaghan 2-16 Armagh 0-9 Pairc Esler
- Tyrone 1-15 Donegal 2-8 Celtic Park

=== Final ===
6 April 2016; 19:30; Final	Monaghan	0-13 - 0-11	Tyrone	Athletic Grounds; Attendance: 4,332; Referee: Niall Cullen (Fermanagh); Man of the Match: Barry McGinn
6 April 2016; 19:30; Final	Barry McGinn 0-6 (0-5f), Conor McCarthy 0-3 (0-1f), Fearghal McMahon, Aaron Lynch, Barry Kerr, Adam Treanor 0-1 each	Report	Lee Brennan 0-5 (0-2f, 1 sl), Cathal McShane 0-2 (0-1f), Shea Hamill, Cillian McCann, Mark Kavanagh, David Mulgrew 0-1 each.	Athletic Grounds; Attendance: 4,332; Referee: Niall Cullen (Fermanagh); Man of the Match: Barry McGinn

== All-Ireland ==
=== Semi-finals ===
15 April 2016; 2:30 pm Semi-final	Mayo	1-15 - 1-14	Dublin	O'Connor Park, Tullamore; Referee: Niall Cullen (Fermanagh); Man of the Match: Diarmuid O’Connor
15 April 2016; 2:30 pm Semi-final	Diarmuid O’Connor 1-1, Liam Irwin (0-3f) and Conor Loftus (0-4f) 0-4 each, Fergal Boland 0-2, Shairoze Akram, Matthew Ruane, Stephen Coen & Fionán Duffy 0-1 each	Report	Con O’Callaghan 1-5 (0-3f), Colm Basquel and Michael Deegan 0-3 each, Eoin Murchan, Glenn O’Reilly and Paddy Small (0-1f) 0-1 each	O'Connor Park, Tullamore; Referee: Niall Cullen (Fermanagh); Man of the Match: Diarmuid O’Connor

15 April 2016; 4:30 pm Semi-final	Cork	2-15 - 1-16	Monaghan	O'Connor Park, Tullamore; Referee: John Hickey (Carlow); Man of the Match: Michael Hurley
15 April 2016; 4:30 pm Semi-final	Ryan Harkin 1-1, Seán O’Donoghue 0-4, Peter Kelleher 1-0, Seán Powter and Michael Hurley 0-3 each, Brian Coakley 0-2, Ronan O’Toole and Stephen Sherlock 0-1 each	Report	Barry McGinn 1-6 (0-2f), Feargal McMahon and Conor McCarthy (0-1f) 0-3 each, Conor Forde (0-1f), Dessie Ward, Ryan McAnespie & Donal Meegan 0-1 each	O'Connor Park, Tullamore; Referee: John Hickey (Carlow); Man of the Match: Michael Hurley

=== Final ===
30 April 2016; 5:00 pm Final	Mayo	5-7 - 1-14	Cork	Cusack Park, Ennis; Attendance: 7,467; Referee: Padraig Hughes (Armagh); Man of the Match: Matthew Ruane
30 April 2016; 5:00 pm Final	Liam Irwin 2-2 (0-1f, 1'45), Conor Loftus 2-2 (0-2f), Diarmuid O’Connor 1-0, Michael Plunkett 0-2, Matthew Ruane 0-1.	Report	Brian Coakley 0-5 (0-3f), Seán O’Donoghue 0-4 (0-3f, 1'45), Peter Kelleher 1-0, Ryan Harkin 0-2, Seán Powter, Ronan O’Toole, Michael Hurley 0-1 each	Cusack Park, Ennis; Attendance: 7,467; Referee: Padraig Hughes (Armagh); Man of the Match: Matthew Ruane
