= Liam Grainger =

Irish Gaelic footballer, selector and administrator (1913–1985)

Personal information
- Native name: Liam Gráinséir (Irish)
- Born: Wiliam Grainger; 5 June 1913 Bandon, County Cork, Ireland
- Died: 4 November 1985 (aged 72) Shandon, Cork, Ireland
- Occupation: Sawmill owner

Sport
- Sport: Gaelic football
- Position: Full-back
Clubs
- Years: Club
- Dohenys → Carbery; Clonakilty
Club titles
- Cork titles: 3
Inter-county
Years	County	Apps (scores)
1937-1940	Cork	6 (0-00)
Inter-county titles
- Munster titles: 0
- All-Irelands: 0
- NFL: 0

William Grainger (5 June 1913 – 4 November 1985) was an Irish Gaelic football player, selector and administrator. He played with club sides Dohenys and Clonakilty, divisional side Carbery and at inter-county level with the Cork senior football team.

== Career ==
Grainger's club career began at minor level with Dohenys in 1930. He quickly progressed to adult level and was part of the Doheny's team that won the Cork JFC title in 1935. Grainger's club performances also earned his selection to the Carbery divisional team that won the Cork SFC title in 1937. He later joined the Clonakilty club and won back-to-back Cork SFC titles in 1946 and 1947.

Grainger first appeared on the inter-county scene with Cork during a two-year stint with the junior team in 1936 and 1937. The latter year also saw him make his first appearance for the senior team. Grainger was at full-back when Cork lost the 1938 Munster final to Kerry. He made his last appearance for the team in 1940. Grainger also lined out with Munster in the Railway Cup.

== Retirement and death ==
In retirement from playing, Grainger was heavily involved in the administrative affairs of the Dohenys club. He also served as chairman of the West Cork Board and was divisional delegate to the Cork County Board. Grainger was also a selector with the Carbery divisional team and with the Dohenys club side that won the Cork JFC title in 1966.

Grainger died at the North Infirmary in Cork on 4 November 1985, at the age of 72.

== Honours ==
=== Player ===
Dohenys

- Cork Junior Football Championship: 1935
- South West Junior A Football Championship: 1931, 1935

Collins

- Cork Senior Football Championship: 1946, 1947

Carbery

- Cork Senior Football Championship: 1937

=== Selector ===
Dohenys

- Cork Junior Football Championship: 1966
