= Eugene Callanan =

Irish Gaelic footballer

Personal information
- Native name: Eoghan Ó Callanáin (Irish)
- Nickname: Nudge
- Born: 14 November 1897 Glasheen, Cork, Ireland
- Died: 3 July 1983 (aged 85) College Road, Cork, Ireland
- Occupation: Medical doctor

Sport
- Sport: Gaelic football
- Position: Right corner-forward
Clubs
- Years: Club
- Collegians; Valley Rovers
Club titles
- Cork titles: 2
College
- Years: College
- University College Cork
College titles
- Sigerson titles: 3
- Fitzgibbon titles: 3
Inter-county
- Years: County
- 1918-1929: Cork
Inter-county titles
- Munster titles: 1
- All-Irelands: 0
- NFL: 0

Eugene Thaddeus Callanan (14 November 1897 – 3 July 1983) was an Irish Gaelic footballer who played at club level with Collegians and at inter-county level with the Cork senior football team. He usually lined out as a forward.

== Career ==
Callanan first came to sporting prominence during his student days at University College Cork. As a dual player, he won both Fitzgibbon Cup and Sigerson Cup medals with UCC's college teams, as well as consecutive County Football Championship titles in 1927-1928. Callanan also lined out with the Cork senior football team at various times between 1918 and 1929. He was part of the team that won the Munster Championship in 1928. Callanan later lined out with the Valley Rovers club in Innishannon.

== Personal life and death ==
Raised in Glasheen, Cork, Callanan was a member of a family that was well known in local government circles with the Cork County Council. As a medical student at University College Cork he interrupted his studies to join the Irish Republican Army and figured prominently during several successful ambushes. Callanan was appointed Medical Officer to the Innishannon area and later resided in Bandon where he also practiced.

Callanan died at the Bon Secours Hospital in Cork on 3 July 1983.

== Honours ==
University College Cork

- Cork Senior Football Championship: 1927, 1928
- Sigerson Cup: 1919, 1926, 1928
- Fitzgibbon Cup: 1922, 1925, 1928

Cork

- Munster Senior Football Championship: 1928
