= John Cronin (Gaelic footballer) =

Irish Gaelic footballer

Personal information
- Native name: Seán Ó Cróinín (Irish)
- Born: 1923 Milltown, County Kerry, Ireland
- Died: 30 July 1992 (aged 69) Tralee, County Kerry, Ireland
- Occupation: Army officer
- Height: 6 ft 0 in (183 cm)

Sport
- Sport: Gaelic football
- Position: Centre-back
Clubs
- Years: Club
- Collins; Milltown/Castlemaine
Club titles
- Cork titles: 3
Inter-county
Years	County	Apps (scores)
1949-1952 1953-1956	Cork; Kerry	12 (0-00); 15 (3-01)
Inter-county titles
- Munster titles: 5
- All-Irelands: 2
- NFL: 1

John Cronin (1923 – 30 July 1992) was an Irish Gaelic footballer who played for club sides Collins and Milltown/Castlemaine and at inter-county level with the Cork and Kerry senior football teams.

== Career ==
Cronin first came to Gaelic football prominence in a number of army tournaments. His performances saw him join his brother Jimmy on the Cork senior team. Cronin won a Munster Championship in his first full season on the team in 1949, before being named captain of the team the following year. He claimed a second Munster Championship title as well as a National League title in his last year with the team in 1952. Cronin joined the Kerry senior team in 1953 and won an All-Ireland title in his debut season. During his four-year tenure with the team, he won three consecutive provincial titles before winning a second All-Ireland title in 1955. At club level, Cronin won three County Championships with Collins Barracks, while he also lined out for Milltown/Castlemaine.

== Personal life and death ==
Born in Milltown, County Kerry, Cronin joined the Irish Army at the age of 18 and was a Quarter Master Sergeant attached to the Military Hospital at Collins Barracks in Cork. He left the Army in 1957 after which he spent three years in the Rhodesian Army. He subsequently lived in London before returning to Milltown in 1974.

Cronin died at Tralee General Hospital on 30 July 1992.

== Honours ==
Collins

- Cork Senior Football Championship: 1949, 1951, 1953

Cork

- Munster Senior Football Championship: 1949, 1952
- National Football League: 1951-52

Kerry

- All-Ireland Senior Football Championship: 1953, 1955
- Munster Senior Football Championship: 1953, 1954, 1955

Sporting positions
Preceded by John O'Keeffe	Cork Senior Football Captain; 1950	Succeeded by Con McGrath
