= Jim Ahern =

Jim Ahern may refer to:

- Jim Ahern (golfer) (born 1949), American golfer
- Jim Ahern (Gaelic footballer) (1922–1988), Irish Gaelic footballer
