= Dave McCarthy (Gaelic footballer) =

Irish Gaelic footballer

Personal information
- Native name: Daithi Mac Cárthaigh (Irish)
- Nickname: Dave Mac
- Born: 1949 (age 76–77) Clonakilty, County Cork, Ireland
- Occupations: Shop owner and retired teacher
- Height: 5 ft 10 in (178 cm)

Sport
- Sport: Gaelic football
- Position: Left wing-forward
Club
| Years | Club | Apps (scores) |
| 1968-1990 | Clonakilty | 38 (4-23) |
Club titles
- Cork titles: 0
College
- Years: College
- University College Dublin
College titles
- Sigerson titles: 1
Inter-county*
| Years | County | Apps (scores) |
| 1972-1979 | Cork | 19 (3-08) |
Inter-county titles
- Munster titles: 2
- All-Irelands: 1
- NFL: 0
- All Stars: 1
- *Inter County team apps and scores correct as of 14:18, 2 October 2022.

David McCarthy (born 1949) is an Irish former Gaelic footballer. At club level he played with Clonakilty and University College Dublin and was also a member of the Cork senior football team.

== Playing career ==
McCarthy first played Gaelic football and hurling at juvenile and underage levels with Clonakilty and won numerous divisional titles in both codes. As a boarder at the De La Salle College in Waterford, he won several shield competitions, two Abbot Cup titles and lined out in the Corn Uí Mhuirí. McCarthy's studies brought him to University College Dublin where he won a Sigerson Cup title in 1973, while he also won a Railway Cup medal with the Combined Universities team the same year. His senior career with the Clonakilty club spanned over 20 years, during which time he ended up on the losing side in the county finals in 1968 and 1983.

McCarthy first played for Cork as a member of the minor team and was an unused substitute in the 1967 All-Ireland minor final defeat of Laois. He never played with the under-21 team but earned selection on the junior team that won the Munster JFC title in 1972. McCarthy's performances in this grade resulted in an immediate call-up to the senior team and he was at left wing-forward when Cork beat Galway in the 1973 All-Ireland final. He also won consecutive Munster SFC titles, four consecutive Railway Cup medals with Munster and was included on the All-Star team in 1976. A car accident in 1979 brought McCarthy's inter-county career to an end.

== Personal life ==
McCarthy's uncle, Humphrey O'Neill, was part of the Cork team that won the 1945 All-Ireland SFC. He qualified with a degree in agricultural science and worked as a secondary school teacher in Clonakilty Community College while also running the family newsagent.

== Honours ==
University College Dublin

- Sigerson Cup: 1973

Clonakilty

- West Cork Junior A Hurling Championship: 1976, 1977, 1983

Cork

- All-Ireland Senior Football Championship: 1973
- Munster Senior Football Championship: 1973, 1974
- Munster Junior Football Championship: 1972
- All-Ireland Minor Football Championship: 1967
- Munster Minor Football Championship: 1967

Combined Universities

- Railway Cup: 1973

Munster

- Railway Cup: 1975, 1976, 1977, 1978
