= Jimmy Cronin =

Irish Gaelic footballer

Personal information
- Native name: Séamus Ó Cróinín (Irish)
- Born: 11 June 1919 Milltown, County Kerry, Ireland
- Died: 25 October 1993 (aged 74) Wilton, Cork, Ireland
- Occupation: Army officer
- Height: 5 ft 9 in (175 cm)

Sport
- Sport: Gaelic football
- Position: Full-forward
Club
- Years: Club
- Collins
Club titles
- Cork titles: 3
Inter-county
Years	County	Apps (scores)
1940-1952	Cork	24 (6-22)
Inter-county titles
- Munster titles: 4
- All-Irelands: 1
- NFL: 1

James Cronin (11 June 1919 – 25 October 1993) was an Irish Gaelic football player and coach who played for club side Collins and at inter-county level with the Cork senior football team.

== Career ==
Cronin first came to Gaelic football prominence in a number of army tournaments. His performances earned him inclusion on the Cork junior team that won the Munster Junior Championship in 1940. Cronin was soon added to the Cork senior team and claimed his first silverware in 1943 when Cork won the Munster Senior Championship for the first time in 15 years. He won a second provincial title two years later before ending the season by lining out at full-forward when Cork claimed the All-Ireland title after a defeat of Cavan in the final. Cronin claimed a further two Munster Championship titles as well as a National League title in his last year with the team in 1952. Around this time he also had successes at club level, winning three County Championship titles with the Collins Barracks side. Cronin also won three Railway Cup medals with Munster. In retirement from playing, he coached Cobh to several championship titles between 1958 and 1968.

== Personal life and death ==
Born in Milltown, County Kerry, Cronin moved to County Cork to join the Irish Army. In 1938 he was a sergeant in the Guard of Honour at Spike Island, County Cork when the Treaty Ports were handed back to the state. Cronin rose to the rank of Battalion Sgt Major. His brothers, Timmy, Paddy and John Cronin, were also members of the Defence Forces, while the latter also played Gaelic football for Cork before later winning All-Ireland titles with Kerry.

Cronin died at the Regional Hospital in Cork on 25 October 1993.

== Honours ==
=== Player ===
Collins

- Cork Senior Football Championship: 1949, 1951, 1953

Cork

- All-Ireland Senior Football Championship: 1945
- Munster Senior Football Championship: 1943, 1945, 1949, 1952
- National Football League: 1951-52
- Munster Junior Football Championship: 1940

Munster

- Railway Cup: 1946, 1948, 1949

=== Coach ===
Cobh

- Cork Intermediate Football Championship: 1968
- Cork Intermediate Hurling Championship: 1963
- Cork Junior Hurling Championship: 1958
