= Johnny Carroll (Gaelic footballer) =

Irish Gaelic footballer

Personal information
- Native name: Seán Ó Cearúil (Irish)
- Born: 1941 Dunmanway, County Cork, Ireland
- Died: 18 May 2026 (aged 84–85) Cork
- Occupation: Electrician
- Height: 5 ft 8 in (173 cm)

Sport
- Sport: Gaelic football
- Position: Left corner-forward
Clubs
- Years: Club
- 1960-1978 1962-1972: Dohenys → Carbery
Club titles
- Cork titles: 2
Inter-county
Years	County	Apps (scores)
1964-1969	Cork	12 (1-12)
Inter-county titles
- Munster titles: 2
- All-Irelands: 0
- NFL: 0

John Carroll (born 1941) is an Irish former Gaelic footballer. He played with club side Dohenys, divisional side Carbery and at inter-county level with the Cork senior football team.

== Playing career ==
Carroll first played Gaelic football at club level with Dohenys. He won several West Cork JFC titles before winning a Cork JFC medal in 1966. Carroll's performances in the junior grade resulted in him being drafted onto the Carbery divisional team and he won two Cork SFC titles. He completed the full set of championship medals when he won a Cork IFC title with Dohenys in 1972.

Carroll's inter-county career with Cork began as a member of the junior team in 1961. His performances in this grade resulted in him being drafted onto the senior team for the 1964 Munster final. Carroll won consecutive Munster SFC medals in 1966 and 1967 and came on as a substitute when Cork were beaten by Meath in the 1967 All-Ireland final. After his senior career ended in 1968, he re-joined the junior team and was a non-playing substitute when Cork won the All-Ireland JFC title in 1972.

== Honours ==
Dohenys

- Cork Intermediate Football Championship: 1972
- Cork Junior Football Championship: 1966
- West Cork Junior A Football Championship: 1962, 1965, 1966

Carbery

- Cork Senior Football Championship: 1968, 1971

Cork

- Munster Senior Football Championship: 1966, 1967
- All-Ireland Junior Football Championship: 1972
- Munster Junior Football Championship: 1972
