= 1960 Cork Senior Football Championship =

Gaelic football match

- Champions: University College Cork (4th title)
- Runners-up: Avondhu

The 1960 Cork Senior Football Championship was the 72nd staging of the Cork Senior Football Championship since its establishment by the Cork County Board in 1887. The draw for the opening round fixtures took place on 31 January 1960.

St Finbarr's entered the championship as the defending champions.

The final was played on 23 October 1960 at the Athletic Grounds in Cork, between University College Cork and Avondhu, in what was their first ever meeting in the final. University College Cork won the match by 1–07 to 0–09 to claim their fourth championship title overall and a first championship title in 32 years.

== Results ==
=== Semi-finals ===
2 October 1960 Semi-final	Avondhu	2-07 - 1-05	Macroom	Cork Athletic Grounds

2 October 1960 Semi-final	University College Cork	3-04 - 1-03	Beara	Clonakilty Town Park

=== Final ===
23 October 1960 Final	University College Cork	1-07 - 0-09	Avondhu	Cork Athletic Grounds
				Referee: L Baker
