= Des McAuley =

Irish Gaelic footballer

Personal information
- Native name: Deasún Mac Amhalaí (Irish)
- Born: 28 January 1976 (age 50) Bantry, County Cork, Ireland
- Occupation: Business analyst

Sport
- Sport: Gaelic football
- Position: Goalkeeper
Club
- Years: Club
- 1993-2008: Bantry Blues
Club titles
- Cork titles: 2
College(s)
- Years: College
- 1994-1996 1996-2002: Waterford RTC; University College Cork
College titles
- Sigerson titles: 0
Inter-county
Years	County	Apps (scores)
1998-1999	Cork	0 (0-00)
Inter-county titles
- Munster titles: 1
- All-Irelands: 0
- NFL: 1
- All Stars: 0

Desmond McAuley (born 28 January 1976) is an Irish former Gaelic footballer. At club level, he played with Bantry Blues and at inter-county level with the Cork senior football team.

== Career ==
McAuley played Gaelic football at all levels as a student at Schull Community College. He earned selection to the Cork vocational schools' team and won All-Ireland Vocational School's SFC medal after a 0-13 to 0-07 win over Donegal in 1994. McAuley later studied at University College Cork and lined out in the Sigerson Cup.

At club level, McAuley began his career at juvenile and underage levels with Bantry Blues. He won back-to-back Cork U21AFC medals while simultaneously progressing to adult level. McAuley was still eligible for the minor grade when he won a Cork IFC medal in 1993 after a 0-12 to 0-10 win over Ballincollig in the final. He later won Cork SFC medals in 1995 and 1998.

At inter-county level, McAuley first appeared for Cork as a member of the minor team that won the All-Ireland MFC title in 1993, after a 2-07 to 0-09 win over Meath in the final. He later spent two seasons with the under-21 team but ended his tenure in that grade without silverware. McAuley also lined out in the League of Ireland with Cobh Ramblers.

McAuley was drafted onto the senior team during the 1998–99 National Football League and captained the team during several games. He ended the campaign with a winners' medal after a defeat of Dublin in the league final. McAuley was later third-choice goalkeeper behind Kevin O'Dwyer and Alan Quirke, and was a member of the extended panel for Cork's defeat by Meath in the 1999 All-Ireland final.

== Honours ==
Schull Community College

- All-Ireland Vocational Schools Senior Football Championship: 1994

Bantry Blues

- Cork Senior Football Championship: 1995, 1998
- Cork Intermediate Football Championship: 1993
- Cork Under-21 A Football Championship: 1993, 1994

Cork

- Munster Senior Football Championship: 1999
- National Football League: 1998–99
- All-Ireland Minor Football Championship: 1993
- Munster Minor Football Championship: 1993
