= 1974 All-Ireland Minor Football Championship =

Gaelic football competition

Championship details

All-Ireland Champions
- Winning team: Cork (6th win)
- Captain: Eugene Desmond

All-Ireland Finalists
- Losing team: Mayo

Provincial Champions
- Munster: Cork
- Leinster: Wicklow
- Ulster: Cavan
- Connacht: Mayo

The 1974 All-Ireland Minor Football Championship was the 43rd staging of the All-Ireland Minor Football Championship, the Gaelic Athletic Association's premier inter-county Gaelic football tournament for boys under the age of 18.

Tyrone entered the championship as defending champions, however, they were defeated in the Ulster Championship.

On 22 September 1974, Cork won the championship following a 1-10 to 1-6 defeat of Mayo in the All-Ireland final. This was their sixth All-Ireland title overall and their first in two championship seasons.

== Results ==
=== Connacht Minor Football Championship ===
Quarter-final

1974 Quarter-final	Sligo	1-03 - 1-15	Leitrim	Dr Hyde Park, Roscommon

Semi-finals

1974 Semi-final	Roscommon	2-08 - 1-10	Leitrim	Pearse Stadium, Galway

1974 Semi-final	Mayo	2-15 - 2-05	Galway	McHale Park, Castlebar

Final

14 July 1974 Final	Mayo	4-12 - 2-03	Roscommon	McHale Park, Castlebar

=== Leinster Minor Football Championship ===
First round

1974 First round	Dublin	1-07 - 1-06	Wexford	Croke Park, Dublin

1974 First round	Carlow	1-03 - 3-08	Louth	Dr Cullen Park, Carlow

Second round

1974 Second round	Carlow	4-11 - 5-06	Kilkenny	Nowlan Park, Kilkenny

1974 Second round	Dublin	1-12 - 0-05	Louth	Croke Park, Dublin

Quarter-finals

1974 Quarter-final	Wicklow	3-11 - 2-12	Laois	O'Moore Park, Portlaoise

1974 Quarter-final	Meath	1-14 - 1-04	Westmeath	Páirc Tailteann, Navan

1974 Quarter-final	Longford	0-12 - 0-06	Kildare	Pearse Park, Longford

1974 Quarter-final	Dublin	1-07 - 1-06	Offaly	O'Moore Park, Portlaoise

Semi-finals

1974 Semi-final	Wicklow	3-09 - 1-05	Meath	St Conleth's Park, Newbridge

1974 Semi-final	Dublin	0-06 - 0-12	Longford	Croke Park, Dublin

Final

28 July 1974 Final	Wicklow	5-06 - 1-09	Longford	Croke Park, Dublin

=== Munster Minor Football Championship ===
Quarter-finals

1974 Quarter-final	Tipperary	2-11 - 3-01	Clare	Gaelic Grounds, Limerick

1974 Quarter-final	Limerick	2-06 - 2-08	Waterford	Fraher Field, Dungarvan

Semi-finals

1974 Semi-final	Kerry	4-18 - 0-00	Waterford	Castleisland

1974 Semi-final	Cork	3-15 - 2-04	Tipperary	Mitchelstown

Final

14 July 1974 Final	Cork	0-13 - 1-06	Kerry	Fitzgerald Stadium, Killarney

=== Ulster Minor Football Championship ===
Quarter-final

1974 Quarter-final	Cavan	2-07 - 2-06	Armagh	Athletic Ground, Armagh

Semi-final

1974 Semi-final	Cavan	1-10 - 1-09	Down	St Tiernach's Park, Clones

Final

28 July 1974 Final	Cavan	3-09 - 1-04	Derry	St Tiernach's Park, Clones

=== All-Ireland Minor Football Championship ===
Quarter-final

4 August 1974 Quarter-final	Cork	2-23 - 2-04	London	Croke Park, Dublin

Semi-finals

11 August 1974 Semi-final	Cork	0-16 - 1-00	Wicklow	Croke Park, Dublin
	R Kenny 0-7, Diarmuid McCarthy 0-5, T Murphy 0-1, D Murphy 0-1, G O'Sullivan 0-1, Don McCarthy 0-1.		E Dunne 1-0.	Referee: S Murray (Monaghan)

18 August 1974 Semi-final	Mayo	3-10 - 2-04	Cavan	Croke Park, Dublin
	J Burke 2-2, K Geraghty 0-4, S Moran 1-0, G Hennigan 0-2, W Nally 0-1, M Burke 0-1.		H Conaty 2-0, S Bardy 0-2, O Martin 0-1, P McNamee 0-1.	Referee: R Barry (Meath)

Final

22 September 1974 Final	Cork	1-10 - 1-06	Mayo	Croke Park, Dublin
	Diarmuid McCarthy 1-3, T Murphy 0-3, D McCurtain 0-1, G O'Sullivan 0-1, M O'Regan 0-1, D Murphy 0-1.		S Moran 1-0, G Hennigan 0-2, K Geraghty 0-2, J Burke 0-2.	Referee: P Collins (Westmeath)

== Championship statistics ==
=== Miscellaneous ===
- Wicklow win the Leinster Championship for the first and only time in their history.
- Cork achieve the double for the third time in their history, after earlier winning the All-Ireland Minor Hurling Championship. Finbarr Delaney, Tom Cashman, Dermot McCurtain, Johnny Crowley, Tadhg Murphy and Declan Murphy claim winners' medals in both All-Ireland victories.
