= Andy O'Shea =

Irish Gaelic footballer (1970-Present)

Personal information
- Native name: Aindriú Ó Sé (Irish)
- Born: 1976 (age 49–50) Kealkill, County Cork, Ireland

Sport
- Sport: Gaelic football
- Position: Centre-back
Clubs
- Years: Club
- St Colum's; Bantry Blues
Club titles
- Cork titles: 2
College
- Years: College
- Cork Institute of Technology
College titles
- Sigerson titles: 0
Inter-county
| Years | County | Apps (scores) |
| 1998-1999 | Cork | 0 (0-00) |
Inter-county titles
- Munster titles: 1
- All-Irelands: 0
- NFL: 1
- All Stars: 0

Andrew O'Shea (born 1976) is an Irish former Gaelic footballer. At club level, he played with St Colum's and Bantry Blues and at inter-county level with the Cork senior football team.

== Career ==
O'Shea played Gaelic football and hurling at all levels as a student at St Finbarr's College in Cork. He was part of the college team that won the Munster Colleges SBFC title in 1994, after a 1-08 to 1-05 win over Mount St Michael's Secondary School, Rosscarbery. O'Shea later studied at Cork Institute of Technology and lined out in the Sigerson Cup.

At club level, O'Shea began his club career with St Colum's before transferring to the Bantry Blues club. He was an unused substitute when Bantry beat Muskerry by 0-10 to 0-08 to win the Cork SFC title in 1995. O'Shea won a second Cork SFC medal in 1998 after coming on as a substitute in the 0-17 to 2-06 defeat of Duhallow in the final.

At inter-county level, O'Shea first appeared for Cork as a member of the minor team that won the All-Ireland MFC title in 1993, after a 2-07 to 0-09 win over Meath in the final. He later spent two seasons with the under-21 team but ended his tenure in that grade without silverware.

O'Shea was drafted onto the senior team during the 1998–99 National Football League. He was a member of the extended panel when Cork claimed the league title after a defeat of Dublin in the league final. O'Shea was also a member of the extended panel for Cork's defeat by Meath in the 1999 All-Ireland final.

== Honours ==
Bantry Blues

- Cork Senior Football Championship: 1995, 1998

Cork

- Munster Senior Football Championship: 1999
- National Football League: 1998–99
- All-Ireland Minor Football Championship: 1993
- Munster Minor Football Championship: 1993
