= Dermot Hurley =

Irish Gaelic footballer

Personal information
- Native name: Diarmuid Ó hUrthuile (Irish)
- Born: 1980 (age 45–46) Castlehaven, County Cork, Ireland
- Occupation: Computer systems engineer
- Height: 6 ft 2 in (188 cm)

Sport
- Sport: Gaelic football
- Position: Mifdield
Club
- Years: Club
- Castlehaven
Club titles
- Cork titles: 3
Inter-county*
Years	County	Apps (scores)
2004-2007	Cork	7 (0-00)
Inter-county titles
- Munster titles: 1
- All-Irelands: 0
- NFL: 0
- All Stars: 0
- *Inter County team apps and scores correct as of 14:43, 18 April 2020.

Dermot Hurley (born 1980) is an Irish retired Gaelic footballer who played for club side Castlehaven and at inter-county level with the Cork senior football team. He usually lined out as a midfielder.

== Career ==
Collins first came to Gaelic football prominence with the Castlehaven team that won the County Under-21 CHampionship title in 1998. He subsequently progressed onto the club's senior team and added a senior medal to his collection in 2003 before similar successes in 2012 and 2013. Hurley also lined out in the minor grade with Cork, and was drafted onto the Cork senior team in 2004. His brief inter-county career saw him claim a Munster Football Championship medal, while he was also a substitute when Cork were beaten by Kerry in the 2007 All-Ireland final.

== Honours ==
Castlehaven

- Cork Senior Football Championship: 2003, 2012, 2013
- Cork Under-21 Football Championship: 1998

Cork

- Munster Senior Football Championship: 2006
