= John Crowley (Cork Gaelic footballer) =

Irish Gaelic footballer

Personal information
- Native name: Seán Ó Crualaoich (Irish)
- Born: 1945 (age 80–81) Dunmanway, County Cork, Ireland
- Occupation: Carpenter
- Height: 5 ft 9 in (175 cm)

Sport
- Sport: Gaelic Football
- Position: Left corner-back
Clubs
- Years: Club
- Dohenys → Carbery
Club titles
- Cork titles: 2
Inter-county
Years	County	Apps (scores)
1965–1969	Cork	9 (0–00)
Inter-county titles
- Munster titles: 2
- All-Irelands: 0
- NFL: 0

John Crowley (born 1945) is an Irish former Gaelic footballer. He played with club side Dohenys, divisional side Carbery and at inter-county level with the Cork senior football team.

== Playing career ==
Crowley first played Gaelic football at club level with Dohenys. He won several West Cork JFC titles before winning a Cork JFC medal in 1966. Crowley's performances in the junior grade resulted in him being drafted onto the Carbery divisional team and he won two Cork SFC titles. He completed the full set of championship medals when he won a Cork IFC title with Dohenys in 1972.

Crowley's inter-county career with Cork began as a member of the junior team that beat London in the 1964 All-Ireland junior final. He progressed onto the under-21 team and was at corner-back when they were beaten by Kildare in the 1965 All-Ireland under-21 final. Crowley also made his debut with the senior team that year. He went on to win consecutive Munster SFC medals in 1966 and 1967 and was a substitute when Cork were beaten by Meath in the 1967 All-Ireland final.

== Honours ==
Dohenys

- Cork Intermediate Football Championship: 1972
- Cork Junior Football Championship: 1966
- West Cork Junior A Football Championship: 1965, 1966

Carbery

- Cork Senior Football Championship: 1968, 1971

Cork

- Munster Senior Football Championship: 1966, 1967
- All-Ireland Junior Football Championship: 1964
- Munster Junior Football Championship: 1964
- Munster Under-21 Football Championship: 1965
