= Declan Murphy (Gaelic footballer) =

Irish Gaelic footballer

Personal information
- Native name: Déaglán Ó Murchú (Irish)
- Born: 1956 (age 69–70) Cork, Ireland

Sport
- Sport: Gaelic football
- Position: Right wing-forward
Club
- Years: Club
- Nemo Rangers
Club titles
- Munster titles: 1
Inter-county*
| Years | County | Apps (scores) |
| 1977-1978 | Cork | 0 (0-00) |
Inter-county titles
- Munster titles: 0
- All-Irelands: 0
- NHL: 0
- All Stars: 0
- *Inter County team apps and scores correct as of 15:53, 30 June 2017.

Declan Murphy (born 1956) is an Irish retired Gaelic footballer. His league and championship career with the Cork senior team lasted for from 1977 until 1978.

Murphy made his debut on the inter-county scene at the age of sixteen when he was selected for the Cork minor team. He enjoyed two championship seasons with the minor team, culminating with the winning of an All-Ireland medal in 1974. Murphy subsequently joined the Cork under-21, however, his three seasons on that team ended without success. By this stage he had joined the Cork senior team and made his debut during the 1978 championship.

== Honours ==
Cork

- All-Ireland Minor Football Championship (1): 1974
- Munster Minor Football Championship (2): 1973, 1974
