= 1926 Cork Senior Football Championship =

Gaelic football competition

- Champions: Macroom (5th title); D. Counihan (captain)
- Runners-up: University College Cork; P. o'Sullivan (captain)

The 1926 Cork Senior Football Championship was the 38th staging of the Cork Senior Football Championship since its establishment by the Cork County Board in 1887.

Nils entered the championship as the defending champions.

On 1 August 1926, Macroom won the championship following a 1–01 to 0–02 defeat of University College Cork in the final. This was their fifth championship title overall and their first title since 1913.

== Results ==
=== Final ===
1 August 1926 Final	Macroom	1-01 - 0-02	University College Cork	Cork Athletic Grounds

=== Miscellaneous ===
- Macroom win the title for the first time since 1913.
