= Fachtna O'Donovan =

Irish Gaelic footballer

Personal information
- Native name: Fachtna Ó Donnabháin (Irish)
- Born: 1921 Rosscarbery, County Cork, Ireland
- Died: 17 October 1995 (aged 74) Skibbereen, County Cork, Ireland
- Height: 6 ft 3 in (191 cm)

Sport
- Sport: Gaelic football
- Position: Right wing-forward
Clubs
- Years: Club
- 1939–1940 1940–1952: Carbery Rangers; Clonakilty
Club titles
- Cork titles: 6
Inter-county
Years	County	Apps (scores)
1943–1949	Cork	12 (1–01)
Inter-county titles
- Munster titles: 3
- All-Irelands: 1
- NFL: 0

Michael Fachtna O'Donovan (1921 – 17 October 1995) was an Irish sportsperson. He played Gaelic football with his local club Clonakilty and was a member of the Cork senior inter-county team from 1943 until 1949.

== Career ==
O'Donovan first came to Gaelic football prominence with the Carbery Rangers team that won consecutive Southwest Junior Championship titles. Around this time he was also drafted onto the Cork minor team and won a Munster Minor Championship title in 1939. O'Donovan subsequently transferred to the Clonakilty club that was enjoying a golden age in terms of success and won six County Championship titles in ten years. He was soon added to the Cork senior team and claimed his first silverware in 1943 when Cork won the Munster Senior Championship for the first time in 15 years. O'Donovan won a second provincial title two years later before ending the season by lining out at midfield when Cork claimed the All-Ireland title after a defeat of Cavan in the final. He claimed a third Munster Championship title in his last year with the team in 1949. O'Donovan also won a Railway Cup medal with Munster in 1948.

== Death ==
O'Donovan died at St Anne's Hospital in Skibbereen on 17 October 1995.

== Honours ==
Carbery Rangers

- West Cork Junior A Football Championship (2): 1939, 1940

Clonakilty

- Cork Senior Football Championship (6): 1942, 1943, 1944, 1946, 1947, 1952
- West Cork Junior A Hurling Championship (5): 1939, 1943, 1944, 1945, 1946

Cork

- All-Ireland Senior Football Championship (1): 1945
- Munster Senior Football Championship (3): 1943, 1945, 1949
- Munster Minor Football Championship (1): 1939

Munster

- Railway Cup (1): 1948

Sporting positions
Preceded by Dave Magnier	Cork Senior Football Captain; 1947–1948	Succeeded by John O'Keeffe
