= Denis O'Driscoll =

Irish Gaelic footballer

Denis O'Drsicoll
Personal information
- Native name: Donncha Ó Drisceoil (Irish)
- Born: 1952 (age 73–74) Cork, Ireland

Sport
- Sport: Gaelic Football
- Position: Left corner-back
Club
- Years: Club
- Nemo Rangers
Club titles
- Cork titles: 6
- Munster titles: 5
- All-Ireland Titles: 3
Inter-county*
Years	County	Apps (scores)
1975-1976	Cork	3 (0-00)
Inter-county titles
- Munster titles: 0
- All-Irelands: 0
- NFL: 0
- *Inter County team apps and scores correct as of 23:42, 2 January 2013.

Denis O'Driscoll (born 1952) is an Irish retired Gaelic footballer who played as a left corner-back for the Cork senior team.

O'Driscoll joined the panel during the 1975 championship and was a regular member of the starting fifteen for just one season during the 1976 championship. During that time he enjoyed little success, ending up as a Munster runner-up on one occasion.

At club level O'Driscoll is a three-time All-Ireland medalist with Nemo Rangers. In addition to this he has also won five Munster medals and six county club championship medals.
