= Michael McCormack (Gaelic footballer) =

Irish Gaelic footballer and hurler

Personal information
- Native name: Mícheál Mac Cormaic (Irish)
- Born: 1943 Kilross, County Tipperary, Ireland
- Died: 13 January 2002 (aged 58) Mallow, County Cork, Ireland
- Occupation: Dairygold co-op secretary
- Height: 6 ft 0 in (183 cm)

Sport
- Sport: Gaelic football
- Position: Full-back
Clubs
- Years: Club
- Aherlow; University College Cork; St Finbarr's
Club titles
	Football	Hurling
Cork titles	2	2
College
- Years: College
- 1962-1968: University College Cork
College titles
- Sigerson titles: 1
- Fitzgibbon titles: 4
Inter-county
- Years: County
- 1965-1971: Tipperary
Inter-county titles
- Munster titles: 0
- All-Irelands: 0
- NFL: 0
- All Stars: 0

Michael McCormack (1943 – 13 January 2002) was an Irish Gaelic footballer who played as a full-back at senior level for the Tipperary county team.

Born in Kilross, County Tipperary, McCormack first played competitive football and hurling during his schooling at Abbey CBS. He arrived on the inter-county scene at the age of seventeen when he first linked up with the Tipperary minor teams as a dual player, before later joining the under-21 football and intermediate and senior hurling teams. He made his senior football debut during the 1965 championship. McCormack went on to play a key role over the next few years, and won one National League (Division 2) medal.

At club level McCormack was a two-time football championship medallist with University College Cork as well as claiming a hurling championship medal with the college. He later won a second hurling championship with St Finbarr's. McCormack began his club career with Aherlow.

His son, Fergal, was an All-Ireland medallist with the Cork hurlers while his brother-in-law, Mick O'Connell, played for Kerry and is regarded as one of the greatest footballers of all-time.

McCormack's retirement came following the conclusion of the 1971 championship.

== Honours ==
=== Team ===
Abbey CBS

- Dr. Harty Cup (1): 1959

University College Cork

- Cork Senior Football Championship (2): 1963, 1964
- Cork Senior Hurling Championship (1): 1963
- Fitzgibbon Cup (4): 1963, 1964, 1966, 1967
- Sigerson Cup (1): 1967

St Finbarr's

- Cork Senior Hurling Championship (1): 1968

Tipperary

- National League (Division 2) (1): 1970-71
