= Timmy Dalton =

Irish retired Gaelic footballer

Personal information
- Native name: Tadhg Daltúin (Irish)
- Born: 1959 (age 66–67) Cork, Ireland

Sport
- Sport: Gaelic football
- Position: Left wing-back
Club
- Years: Club
- 1977-1994: Nemo Rangers
Club titles
- Cork titles: 7
- Munster titles: 6
- All-Ireland Titles: 5
Inter-county*
Years	County	Apps (scores)
1979-1988	Cork	5 (1-10)
Inter-county titles
- Munster titles: 1
- All-Irelands: 0
- NFL: 1
- All Stars: 0
- *Inter County team apps and scores correct as of 00:28, 24 December 2016.

Timothy Dalton (born 1959) is an Irish retired Gaelic footballer. His league and championship career with the Cork senior team spanned several seasons from 1979 to 1988.

Born in Cork, Dalton first played competitive Gaelic football in his youth. He first appeared for the Nemo Rangers club at underage levels, winning back-to-back under-21 championship medals. Dalton subsequently progressed onto the Nemo Rangers senior team and went on to win five All-Ireland medals in a career that spanned three decades. He also won six Munster medals and seven county senior championship medals.

Dalton made his debut on the inter-county scene when he was selected on the Cork minor team in 1976. He enjoyed two championship seasons with the minors and collected back-to-back Munster medals. Dalton subsequently joined the Cork under-21 team, winning one All-Ireland medal as captain in 1980. By this stage he had also joined the Cork senior team, making his debut during the 1979-80 league. Over the course of the next few seasons, Dalton was a regular member of the team and won one Munster medal and one National Football League medal. Dalton played his last game for Cork in May 1988.

== Honours ==
Nemo Rangers

- All-Ireland Senior Club Football Championship (5): 1979, 1982, 1984, 1989, 1994
- Munster Senior Club Football Championship (6): 1978, 1981, 1983, 1987, 1988, 1993
- Cork Senior Football Championship (7): 1977, 1978, 1981, 1983, 1987, 1988, 1993

Cork

- Munster Senior Football Championship (1): 1988
- National Football League (1): 1979-80
- All-Ireland Under-21 Football Championship (1): 1980 (c)
- Munster Under-21 Football Championship (2): 1979, 1980
- Munster Minor Football Championship (2): 1976, 1977

Achievements
Preceded by Ned King	All-Ireland Under-21 Football Final winning captain 1980	Succeeded by Seán Hayes
