= Brian O'Regan (Gaelic footballer) =

Irish Gaelic footballer

Personal information
- Native name: Briain Ó Riagáin (Irish)
- Born: 14 February 1983 (age 43) Cork, Ireland
- Height: 5 ft 10 in (178 cm)

Sport
- Sport: Gaelic football
- Position: Left wing-back
Club
- Years: Club
- 2002-present: Nemo Rangers
Club titles
- Cork titles: 6
- Munster titles: 5
- All-Ireland Titles: 1
Inter-county
Years	County	Apps (scores)
2008-present	Cork	5 (0-00)
Inter-county titles
- Munster titles: 2
- All-Irelands: 2
- NFL: 0
- All Stars: 0

Brian O'Regan (born 14 February 1983 in Cork, Ireland) is an Irish Gaelic footballer. He plays for his local club Nemo Rangers and has been a member of the Cork senior inter-county team since 2008.
