= 1972 All-Ireland Junior Football Championship =

All Ireland Champions
- Winners: Cork (5th win)
- Captain: D. Kehilly

All Ireland Runners-up
- Runners-up: Hertfordshire
- Captain: P. Murphy

Provincial Champions
- Munster: Cork
- Leinster: Offaly
- Ulster: Antrim
- Connacht: Galway

The 1972 All-Ireland Junior Football Championship was the 51st staging of the All-Ireland Junior Championship since its establishment by the Gaelic Athletic Association in 1912.

London entered the championship as the defending champions, however, they were beaten in the British Junior Championship.

The All-Ireland final was played on 1 October 1972 at the Athletic Grounds in Cork, between Cork and Hertfordshire, in what was their first ever meeting in the final. Cork won the match by 5–16 to 0–03 to claim their fifth championship title overall and a first tile in eight years.

== Results ==
=== All-Ireland Junior Football Championship ===
==== All-Ireland semi-finals ====
31 July 1972 Semi-final	Galway	1-13 - 3-04	Antrim	Dunlo GAA Grounds

6 August 1972 Semi-final	Offaly	0-08 - 1-11	Cork	O'Connor Park

==== All-Ireland home final ====
10 September 1972 Home final	Cork	1-10 - 0-08	Galway	Gaelic Grounds

==== All-Ireland final ====
1 October 1972 Final	Cork	5-16 - 0-03	Hertfordshire	Cork Athletic Grounds
