= Jimmy Kerrigan =

Irish Gaelic footballer

Personal information
- Native name: Séamus Ó Ciaragáin (Irish)
- Born: 8 March 1959 (age 67) Cork, Ireland
- Occupation: Electrical engineer
- Height: 5 ft 11 in (180 cm)

Sport
- Sport: Gaelic football
- Position: Forward
Club
- Years: Club
- 1978-1994: Nemo Rangers
Club titles
- Cork titles: 7
- Munster titles: 6
- All-Ireland Titles: 5
Inter-county
Years	County	Apps (scores)
1978-1990	Cork	29 (0-5)
Inter-county titles
- Munster titles: 4 (1 as sub)
- All-Irelands: 2 (1 as sub)
- NFL: 2
- All Stars: 1

Jimmy Kerrigan (born 8 March 1959 in Cork, Ireland) is a former Irish sportsman. He played Gaelic football with his local club Nemo Rangers and was a member of the Cork senior inter-county team from 1978 until 1990. Kerrigan is one of the most decorated inter-county club footballers of all-time. His son, Paul Kerrigan, is currently a member of the Cork senior football team.

== Honours ==
=== Nemo Rangers ===
- All-Ireland Senior Club Football Championship:
  - Winner (5): 1979, 1982, 1984 (c), 1989, 1994
- Munster Senior Club Football Championship:
  - Winner (6): 1978, 1981, 1983 (c), 1987, 1988, 1993
- Cork Senior Football Championship:
  - Winner (7): 1977, 1978, 1981, 1983 (c), 1987, 1988, 1993
- Cork Under-21 Football Championship:
  - Winner (2): 1979, 1980

=== Cork ===
- All-Ireland Senior Football Championship:
  - Winner (2): 1989, 1990 (sub)
  - Runner-up (1): 1987
- Munster Senior Football Championship:
  - Winner (4): 1983, 1987, 1989, 1990 (sub)
  - Runner-up (8): 1978, 1979, 1980, 1981, 1982, 1984, 1985, 1986
- National Football League:
  - Winner (2): 1979–80, 1988–89
  - Runner-up (2): 1978–79, 1981–82
- All-Ireland Under-21 Football Championship:
  - Winner (1): 1980
  - Runner-up (1): 1979
- Munster Under-21 Football Championship:
  - Winner (2): 1979, 1980
  - Runner-up (1): 1978
- Munster Minor Football Championship:
  - Winner (1): 1977

=== Munster ===
- Railway Cup:
  - Winner (1): 1982
  - Runner-up (1): 1985

=== Ireland ===
- International Rules Series:
  - Winner (2): 1984, 1986

Sporting positions
Preceded by Christy Ryan	Cork Senior Football Captain; 1984	Succeeded by Conor Counihan
Achievements
Preceded by Brian Scully (Portlaoise)	All-Ireland Senior Club Football Final winning captain 1984	Succeeded by Billy Lyons (Castleisland Desmonds)
