= Dave Roche (Gaelic footballer) =

Irish Gaelic footballer (1923–2020)

Personal information
- Native name: Daithí de Róiste (Irish)
- Nickname: Rookie
- Born: May 1923 Fermoy, County Cork, Ireland
- Died: 5 November 2020 (aged 97) Fermoy, County Cork, Ireland
- Occupation: Plasterer
- Height: 6 ft 2 in (188 cm)

Sport
- Sport: Gaelic football
- Position: Goalkeeper
Club
- Years: Club
- Fermoy
Club titles
- Cork titles: 1
Inter-county
| Years | County | Apps (scores) |
| 1944-1953 | Cork | 2 (0-00) |
Inter-county titles
- Munster titles: 0
- All-Irelands: 0
- NFL: 0

David Roche (May 1923 – 5 November 2020) was an Irish Gaelic footballer who played for club side Fermoy and at inter-county level with the Cork senior football team.

== Career ==
Roche first came to Gaelic football prominence on the Fermoy team that faced CLonakilty in five consecutive county finals from 1942 to 1946. He ended up on the winning side on just one occasion in 1945. Roche's performances at club level saw him join the Cork senior football team for the opening round of the 1944 Munster Championship. He was replaced as first-choice goalkeeper by Moll O'Driscoll the following year, however, he remained close to the panel that claimed the All-Ireland title after a defeat of Cavan in the final. Roche was also a regular with the Cork junior team and won a Munster Championship title in that grade in 1953.

== Personal life and death ==
Roche was born in Fermoy, County Cork and spent his entire working life as a plasterer. He was also renowned as a singer and was one of the longest-serving members of the Fermoy Choral Society. Roche died on 5 November 2020.

== Honours ==
Fermoy

- Cork Senior Football Championship: 1945

Cork

- Munster Junior Football Championship: 1953
