= Tim O'Callaghan =

Irish Gaelic footballer

Personal information
- Native name: Tadhg Ó Ceallacháin (Irish)
- Born: 1935 (age 90–91) Macroom, County Cork, Ireland

Sport
- Sport: Gaelic Football
- Position: Right corner-back
Club
- Years: Club
- Macroom
Inter-county*
Years	County	Apps (scores)
1957-1964	Cork	9 (0-00)
Inter-county titles
- Munster titles: 0
- All-Irelands: 0
- NFL: 0
- *Inter County team apps and scores correct as of 00:15, 2 January 2012.

Timothy O'Callaghan (born 1935) is an Irish retired Gaelic footballer who played as a right corner-back for the Cork senior team.

O'Callaghan joined the team during the 1957 championship and was a regular member of the starting fifteen until his retirement following the completion of the 1964 championship. During that time he enjoyed little success on the inter-county seen, winning just one Munster medal as a non-playing substitute.

O'Callaghan also enjoyed a successful club career with Macroom, winning two county club championship medals.
