= Dermot Kehilly =

Irish Gaelic footballer

Personal information
- Native name: Diarmuid Mac Caochlaoich (Irish)
- Born: 1944 (age 81–82) Newcestown, County Cork, Ireland

Sport
- Sport: Gaelic football
- Position: Full-back
Club
- Years: Club
- Newcestown
Inter-county*
Years	County	Apps (scores)
1965-1969	Cork	3 (0-00)
Inter-county titles
- Munster titles: 0
- All-Irelands: 0
- NFL: 0
- *Inter County team apps and scores correct as of 17:42, 15 July 2014.

Dermot Kehilly (born 1944) is an Irish retired Gaelic footballer who played as a full-back for the Cork senior football team.

Born in Newcestown, County Cork, Kehilly first played competitive football in his youth. He arrived on the inter-county scene at the age of seventeen when he first linked up with the Cork minor team, before later joining the under-21 and junior sides. He made his senior debut during the 1965 championship and was a regular member of the starting fifteen for a brief period. He was a Munster runner-up on one occasion.

At club level Kehily won numerous championship medals with Newcestown.

Throughout his career Kehilly played just three championship games for Cork. His retirement came following the conclusion of the 1969 championship.

Kehilly's brothers, Kevin and Frank, also played Gaelic football with Cork.

== Honours ==
=== Team ===
Newcestown

- Cork Intermediate Football Championship (1): 1971
- Cork Junior Hurling Championship (1): 1972
- Cork Junior Football Championship (1): 1967

Cork

- All-Ireland Junior Football Championship (1): 1972
- Munster Junior Football Championship (1): 1972
- Munster Under-21 Football Championship (1): 1963
- All-Ireland Minor Football Championship (1): 1961 (sub)
- Munster Minor Football Championship (1): 1961 (sub)
