= 1953 Cork Senior Football Championship =

Gaelic football competition

- Dates: 12 April – 8 November 1953
- Teams: 24
- Champions: Collins (4th title); J. O'Boyle (captain)
- Runners-up: University College Cork; P. Sheehy (captain)

Tournament statistics
- Matches played: 27
- Goals scored: 75 (2.78 per match)
- Points scored: 277 (10.26 per match)

The 1953 Cork Senior Football Championship was the 65th staging of the Cork Senior Football Championship since its establishment by the Cork County Board in 1887. The draw for the first round fixtures took place on 18 January 1953. The championship ran from 12 April to 8 November 1953.

Clonakilty were the defending champions, however, they were beaten by Canovee in a first round replay.

The final, a replay, was played on 8 November 1953 at the Athletic Grounds in Cork, between Collins and University College Cork, in what was their first ever meeting in the final. Clonakilty won the match by 1–08 to 1–04 to claim their fourth championship title overall and a first title in two years.

== Results ==
=== First round ===
12 April 1953 First round	Carbery	0-06 - 2-05	St Vincent's	Ballineen Grounds

12 April 1953 First round	Collins	2-05 - 0-01	Glanmire	Riverstown Sportsfield

12 April 1953 First round	Carrigdhoun	0-02 - 1-04	Garda	Carrigaline Grounds

12 April 1953 First round	Imokilly	4-04 - 1-03	St Patrick's	Midleton Grounds

19 April 1953 First round	Fermoy	1-06 - 0-01	Avondhu	Shanballymore Grounds

26 April 1953 First round	Macroom	1-06 - 2-03	Castlemagner	Millstreet Grounds

26 April 1953 First round	Beara	2-10 - 4-01	Redmonds	Bantry Grounds

3 May 1953 First round	St Finbarr's	5-09 - 2-02	Muskerry	Coachford Grounds

17 May 1953 First round	Duhallow	3-06 - 6-04	Seandún	Bishop Casey Memorial Park

17 May 1953 First round	University College Cork	1-07 - 1-01	St Nicholas'	Cork Athletic Grounds

17 May 1953 First round	Lees	2-06 - 0-10	Millstreet	Castle Grounds

24 May 1953 First round	Clonakilty	1-02 - 0-05	Canovee	Bandon Grounds

21 June 1953 First round replay	Macroom	1-04 - 0-04	Castlemagner	Millstreet Grounds

28 June 1953 First round replay	Clonakilty	0-06 - 3-04	Canovee	Bandon Grounds

=== Second round ===
21 June 1953 Second round	St Finbarr's	2-07 - 1-07	Lees	The Mardyke

28 June 1953 Second round	Fermoy	2-06 - 1-02	Garda	Riverstown Sportsfield

28 June 1953 Second round	Collins	2-06 - 0-02	St Vincent's	The Mardyke

26 July 1953 Second round	Canovee	2-08 - 0-06	Beara	Glengarriff Grounds

9 August 1953 Second round	University College Cork	1-08 - 0-00	Macroom	Coachford Sportsfield

9 August 1953 Second round	Imokilly	1-07 - 2-04	Seandún	Riverstown Sportsfield

16 August 1953 Second round replay	Imokilly	2-11 - 2-02	Seandún	Riverstown Sportsfield

=== Third round ===
30 August 1953 Third round	Canovee	0-09 - 0-03	Fermoy	Cork Athletic Grounds

20 September 1953 Third round	Collins	3-08 - 0-03	St Finbarr's	The Mardyke

- Imokilly and University College Cork received a bye in this round.

=== Semi-finals ===
4 October 1953 Semi-final	University College Cork	3-08 - 0-03	Imokilly	Midleton Grounds

11 October 1953 Semi-final	Collins	1-09 - 1-05	Canovee	Coachford Sportsfield

=== Final ===
18 October 1953 Final	Collins	1-07 - 1-07	University College Cork	Cork Athletic Grounds
				Referee: T Crowley (Clonakilty)

=== Final replay ===
8 November 1953 Final replay	Collins	1-08 - 1-04	University College Cork	Cork Athletic Grounds
				Referee: T Crowley (Clonakilty)
