= Gene Desmond =

Irish retired Gaelic footballer

Personal information
- Native name: Eoghan Ó Deasúnaigh (Irish)
- Nickname: Gene
- Born: 1956 (age 69–70) Togher, Cork, Ireland

Sport
- Sport: Gaelic football
- Position: Full-back
Club
- Years: Club
- St Finbarr's
Club titles
- Cork titles: 4
- Munster titles: 3
- All-Ireland Titles: 2
Inter-county*
Years	County	Apps (scores)
1977-1978	Cork	2 (0-00)
Inter-county titles
- Munster titles: 0
- All-Irelands: 0
- NHL: 0
- All Stars: 0
- *Inter County team apps and scores correct as of 15:53, 30 June 2017.

Eugene "Gene" Desmond (born 1956) is an Irish former Gaelic footballer. His league and championship career at senior level with the Cork county team lasted for the 1977-78 season.

Born in Cork, Desmond first played for the St Finbarr's club at juvenile and underage levels before joining the senior team. In a club career that lasted over a decade, he won two All-Ireland medals, three Munster medals and four county senior championship medals.

Desmond made his debut on the inter-county scene at the age of sixteen when he was selected for the Cork minor team. He enjoyed two championship seasons with the minor team, culminating with the winning of an All-Ireland medal as captain in 1974. Desmond subsequently joined the Cork under-21; however, his three seasons on that team ended without success. By this stage he had joined the Cork senior team and made his debut during the 1978 championship.

== Honours ==
St Finbarr's

- All-Ireland Senior Club Football Championship (2): 1980, 1981
- Munster Senior Club Football Championship (3): 1979, 1980, 1982
- Cork Senior Football Championship (4): 1979, 1980, 1982, 1985

Cork

- All-Ireland Minor Football Championship (1): 1974
- Munster Minor Football Championship (2): 1973, 1974

Achievements
Preceded by Dessie McKenna	All-Ireland Minor Football Final winning captain 1974	Succeeded by Robert Bunyan
