= Kieran Collins =

Irish Gaelic footballer

Personal information
- Native name: Ciarán Ó Coileáin (Irish)
- Born: 1954 (age 71–72) Cork, Ireland

Sport
- Sport: Gaelic Football
- Position: Midfield
Club
- Years: Club
- Nemo Rangers
Club titles
- Cork titles: 5
- Munster titles: 4
- All-Ireland Titles: 2
Inter-county*
Years	County	Apps (scores)
1974-1976	Cork	2 (0-00)
Inter-county titles
- Munster titles: 0
- All-Irelands: 0
- NFL: 0
- *Inter County team apps and scores correct as of 00:03, 3 January 2013.

Keran Collins (born 1954) is an Irish retired Gaelic footballer who played as a midfielder for the Cork senior team.

Collins joined the panel during the 1974 championship and was a regular member of the starting fifteen for just one season during the 1976 championship. During that time he enjoyed little success, ending up as a Munster runner-up on one occasion.

At club level Collins is a two-time All-Ireland medalist with Nemo Rangers. In addition to this he has also won four Munster medals and five county club championship medals.
