= Mark Healy (Gaelic footballer) =

Irish Gaelic footballer

Personal information
- Native name: Marc Ó hÉilí (Irish)
- Born: 1960 (age 65–66) Cork, Ireland

Sport
- Sport: Gaelic football
- Position: Full-back
Club
- Years: Club
- St Finbarr's
Club titles
- Cork titles: 2
- Munster titles: 2
- All-Ireland Titles: 1
Inter-county*
| Years | County | Apps (scores) |
| 1981-1984 | Cork | 9 (0-00) |
Inter-county titles
- Munster titles: 1
- All-Irelands: 0
- NFL: 0
- *Inter County team apps and scores correct as of 14:57, 3 January 2013.

Mark Healy (born 1960) is an Irish former Gaelic footballer who played as a full-back at senior level for the Cork county team.

Healy joined the panel during the 1981 championship and was a regular member of the starting fifteen for four seasons until his retirement after the 1984 championship. During that time he won one Munster medal.

At club level Healy is an All-Ireland medalist with St Finbarr's In addition to this he also won two Munster medals and two county club championship medals.
