= Micheál Martin (Gaelic footballer) =

Irish Gaelic footballer

Personal information
- Born: 1994 (age 31–32) Ballinlough, Cork, Ireland

Sport
- Sport: Gaelic football
- Position: Goalkeeper
Club
- Years: Club
- Nemo Rangers
Club titles
- Cork titles: 5
- Munster titles: 2
- All-Ireland Titles: 0
College
- Years: College
- 2013–2018: University College Cork
College titles
- Sigerson titles: 0
Inter-county*
Years	County	Apps (scores)
2015–present	Cork	4 (0–00)
Inter-county titles
- Munster titles: 0
- All-Irelands: 0
- NHL: 0
- All Stars: 0
- *Inter County team apps and scores correct as of 22:21, 30 January 2022.

Micheál Aodh Martin (born 1994) is an Irish Gaelic footballer who plays for Cork Championship club Nemo Rangers and at senior level for the Cork county team. He usually lines out as a goalkeeper. He is the son of Micheál Martin, Ireland's fifteenth and current Taoiseach.

== Career ==
Martin first came to prominence as a Gaelic footballer with the Nemo Rangers club, beginning at juvenile and underage levels before progressing onto the club's senior team. He lined out in goal when the club were beaten by Corofin in the 2018 All-Ireland club final, while he has also won four Cork PSFC titles, including one as team captain in 2020. Martin first appeared on the inter-county scene as a member of the Cork minor football team in 2012 before later winning a Munster Championship title with the under-21 team. He made his Cork senior football team debut in the 2015 National League.

== Career statistics ==
As of match played 30 January 2022

Team	Year	National League			Munster		All-Ireland		Total	
Team	Year	Division	Apps	Score	Apps	Score	Apps	Score	Apps	Score
Cork	2015	Division 1	1	0-00	0	0-00	0	0-00	1	0-00
Cork	2016	Division 1	1	0-00	0	0-00	0	0-00	1	0-00
Cork	2017	Division 2	0	0-00	0	0-00	0	0-00	0	0-00
Cork	2018	Division 2	0	0-00	0	0-00	0	0-00	0	0-00
Cork	2019	Division 2	1	0-00	0	0-00	0	0-00	1	0-00
Cork	2020	Division 3	4	0-00	2	0-00	—		6	0-00
Cork	2021	Division 2	4	0-00	2	0-00	—		6	0-00
Cork	2022	Division 2	1	0-00	0	0-00	0	0-00	1	0-00
Total			12	0-00	4	0-00	0	0-00	16	0-00

== Honours ==
Nemo Rangers

- Munster Senior Club Football Championship: 2017, 2019
- Cork Premier Senior Football Championship: 2015, 2017, 2019, 2020 (c)

Cork

- Munster Under-21 Football Championship: 2014
