= Gerald Mulcahy =

Irish hurler

Personal information
- Native name: Gearóid Ó Maolcatha (Irish)
- Born: 1934 Blackpool, Cork, Ireland
- Died: 9 November 1994 (aged 60) Grenville Place, Cork, Ireland
- Occupation: County council employee

Sport
- Sport: Hurling
- Position: Left corner-back
Clubs
- Years: Club
- Glen Rovers; St. Nicholas'
Club titles
	Football	Hurling
Cork titles	1	1
Inter-county
Years	County	Apps (scores)
1959	Cork	2 (0-00)
Inter-county titles
- Munster titles: 0
- All-Irelands: 0
- NHL: 0

Gerald Mulcahy (1934 – 9 November 1994) was an Irish hurler who played at club level with Glen Rovers and at inter-county level with the Cork senior hurling team. He usually lined out as a defender.

== Career ==
Mulcahy first came to prominence as a hurler with the Glen Rovers club on Cork's northside. He was only 16-years-old when he won a Cork JHC title in 1950. He later won a Cork SHC title with the senior team in 1959, having already won a Cork SFC with sister club St. Nicholas' in 1954. Mulcahy was a dual player when he first appeared on the inter-county scene at minor level. He was a reserve when Cork won the All-Ireland MHC in 1951 before winning a Munster MFC title in 1952. Mulcahy won an All-Ireland JHC title in 1955 and was one of seven players who made their senior team debut when Cork were beaten by Waterford in the 1959 Munster final.

== Personal life and death ==
Mulcahy died suddenly at the Mercy Hospital on 9 November 1994. His son, Tomás Mulcahy, captained Cork to victory in the 1990 All-Ireland final.

== Honours ==
St. Nicholas'

- Cork Senior Football Championship: 1954

Glen Rovers

- Cork Senior Hurling Championship: 1959

Cork

- All-Ireland Junior Hurling Championship: 1955
- Munster Junior Hurling Championship: 1955
- All-Ireland Minor Hurling Championship: 1951
- Munster Minor Hurling Championship: 1951
- Munster Minor Football Championship: 1952
