= 1993 All-Ireland Minor Football Championship =

Gaelic football competition

Championship details

All-Ireland Champions
- Winning team: Cork (9th win)

All-Ireland Finalists
- Losing team: Meath

Provincial Champions
- Munster: Cork
- Leinster: Meath
- Ulster: Tyrone
- Connacht: Galway

The 1993 All-Ireland Minor Football Championship was the 62nd staging of the All-Ireland Minor Football Championship, the Gaelic Athletic Association's premier inter-county Gaelic football tournament for boys under the age of 18.

Meath entered the championship as defending champions.

On 19 September 1993, Cork won the championship following a 2–7 to 0–9 defeat of Meath in the All-Ireland final. This was their 9th All-Ireland title overall and their first title in two championship seasons.

== Results ==
=== Connacht Minor Football Championship ===
Quarter-Final

May 1993 Quarter-Final	Galway	1-12 - 0-8	Leitrim

Semi-Finals

June 1993 Semi-Final	Mayo	4-11 - 1-5	Sligo	Markievicz Park, Sligo

June 1993 Semi-Final	Galway	2-12 - 3-9	Roscommon	Páirc Seán Mac Diarmada, Carrick-on-Shannon

Finals

25 July 1993 Final	Galway	0-11 - 1-8	Mayo	Dr Hyde Park, Roscommon

1 August 1993 Final Replay	Galway	3-8 - 1-10	Mayo	St Jarlath's Park, Tuam

=== Leinster Minor Football Championship ===
Preliminary Round

May 1993 Preliminary Round	Dublin	0-13 - 0-11	Wexford	Parnell Park, Dublin

May 1993 Preliminary Round	Wicklow	7-9 - 2-9	Kilkenny	Nowlan Park, Kilkenny

Quarter-Finals

May 1993 Quarter-Final	Westmeath	2-2 - 4-7	Dublin	Castletown Geoghegan

June 1993 Quarter-Final	Louth	2-5 - 0-14	Meath	Dundalk

June 1993 Quarter-Final	Wicklow	2-10 - 0-12	Kildare	Pearse Park, Arklow

June 1993 Quarter-Final	Carlow	0-11 - 0-11	Offaly	O'Connor Park, Tullamore

June 1993 Quarter-Final Replay	Carlow	0-7 - 1-5	Offaly	Dr Cullen Park, Carlow

Semi-Finals

June 1993 Semi-Final	Wicklow	5-15 - 2-8	Offlay	O'Moore Park, Portlaoise

July 1993 Semi-Final	Meath	2-9 - 0-5	Dublin	Croke Park, Dublin

Final

25 July 1993 Final	Meath	1-16 - 3-3	Wicklow	Croke Park, Dublin

=== Munster Minor Football Championship ===
Quarter-Finals

May 1993 Quarter-Final	Cork	1-14 - 0-7	Clare	FitzGerald Park, Kilmallock

May 1993 Quarter-Final	Tipperary	1-13 - 0-7	Waterford	Ned Hall Park, Clonmel

Semi-Finals

June 1993 Semi-Final	Tipperary	3-17 - 1-6	Limerick	Ned Hall Park, Clonmel

June 1993 Semi-Final	Cork	2-7 - 1-9	Kerry	Austin Stack Park, Tralee

Final

18 July 1993 Final	Cork	2-15 - 2-7	Tipperary	Semple Stadium, Thurles

=== Ulster Minor Football Championship ===
Preliminary Round

May 1993 Preliminary Round	Fermanagh	1-12 - 0-10	Armagh	St. Molaise Park, Irvinestown

Quarter-Finals

May 1993 Quarter-Final	Cavan	2-17 - 0-13	Monaghan	St Mary's Park, Castleblaney

June 1993 Quarter-Final	Down	0-9 - 1-7	Derry	Pairc Esler, Newry

June 1993 Quarter-Final	Donegal	1-9 - 1-5	Antrim	MacCumhaill Park, Ballybofey

June 1993 Quarter-Final	Tyrone	2-14 - 2-3	Fermanagh	Athletic Grounds, Armagh

Semi-Finals

June 1993 Semi-Final	Cavan	1-8 - 1-14	Derry	Casement Park, Belfast

June 1993 Semi-Final	Tyrone	0-12 - 2-14	Donegal	Breffni Park, Cavan

Final

18 July 1993 Final	Tyrone	1-9 - 1-5	Derry	St Tiernach's Park, Clones

=== All-Ireland Minor Football Championship ===
Semi-Finals

15 August 1993 Semi-Final	Cork	4-11 - 0-04	Galway	Croke Park, Dublin

22 August 1993 Semi-Final	Tyrone	0-10 - 3-17	Meath	Croke Park, Dublin

Final

19 September 1993 Final	Cork	2-07 - 0-09	Meath	Croke Park, Dublin
