= Kevin Kehily =

Irish hurler and Gaelic footballer (1949–2024)

Personal information
- Native name: Caoimhín Mac Caochlaoich (Irish)
- Born: 1949 Newcestown, County Cork, Ireland
- Died: 18 August 2024 (aged 74) Cork, Ireland
- Occupation: Physical education lecturer
- Height: 5 ft 11 in (180 cm)

Sport
- Sport: Gaelic Football
- Position: Left wing-back
Clubs
- Years: Club
- 1966-1988: Newcestown → Carbery
Club titles
- Cork titles: 2
College
- Years: College
- University College Dublin
College titles
- Fitzgibbon titles: 1
Inter-county*
Years	County	Apps (scores)
1969-1984	Cork	28 (0-00)
Inter-county titles
- Munster titles: 3
- All-Irelands: 0
- NFL: 0
- All Stars: 2
- *Inter County team apps and scores correct as of 16:04, 3 January 2013.

Kevin Kehily (1949 – 18 August 2024) was an Irish Gaelic footballer and coach. At club level he played with Newcestown, divisional side Carbery and at inter-county level with the Cork senior football team. He usually lined out as a defender.

== Playing career ==
A member of the Newcestown club, Kehily won Southwest Schools' Shield and Divisional Juvenile Championship titles in his early playing days. He also lined out with Bandon and won Munster Colleges' titles as a dual player with Hamilton High School. Kehily's adult club career with Newcestown lasted over 20 years, during which time he won junior championship titles in both codes as well as an intermediate championship title as a footballer in 1971. He also earned inclusion on the Carbery divisional team and was part of their County Championship-winning teams in 1968 and 1971. Kehily first appeared on the inter-county scene as part of the Cork minor team that won the 1967 All-Ireland Minor Championship, before winning an All-Ireland Under-21 Championship title in 1970. By this stage Kehily had already begun his 15-year association with the Cork senior football team. During that time he won three Munster Championship and two All-Stars, however, his university studies in London resulted in him missing Cork's defeat of Galway in the 1973 All-Ireland final. Kehily also won five Railway Cup medals with Munster.

== Coaching career ==
Kehily's occupation as a physical education instructor resulted in him being appointed trainer of the Cork senior hurling team in 1975. Over the following three seasons Cork secured three successive All-Ireland Championship titles. Kehily also had a spell in charge of the Courcey Rovers club before returning as Cork senior hurling team trainer in 1993.

== Death ==
Kehily died after a long illness on 18 August 2024, at the age of 74.

== Honours ==
University College Dublin

- Fitzgibbon Cup: 1969

Newcestown

- Cork Intermediate Football Championship: 1971
- Cork Junior Hurling Championship: 1972, 1980
- Cork Junior Football Championship: 1967
- South West Junior A Hurling Championship: 1967, 1969, 1972, 1979, 1980
- South West Junior A Football Championship: 1967

Carbery

- Cork Senior Football Championship: 1968, 1971

Cork

- Munster Senior Football Championship: 1971, 1974, 1983
- All-Ireland Under-21 Football Championship: 1970
- Munster Under-21 Football Championship: 1969, 1970
- All-Ireland Minor Football Championship: 1967
- Munster Minor Football Championship: 1967

Munster

- Railway Cup: 1976, 1977, 1978, 1981, 1982
