= 1937 Cork Senior Football Championship =

Gaelic football competition

- Dates: 4 April – 12 September 1937
- Teams: 12
- Champions: Carbery (1st title); T. Cotter (captain)
- Runners-up: Duhallow West

Tournament statistics
- Matches played: 12
- Goals scored: 28 (2.33 per match)
- Points scored: 92 (7.67 per match)

The 1937 Cork Senior Football Championship was the 49th staging of the Cork Senior Football Championship since its establishment by the Cork County Board in 1887. The draw for the first round fixtures took place on 31 January 1937. The championship ran from 4 April to 12 September 1937.

Duhallow West were the defending champions.

The final was played on 12 September 1937 at the Athletic Grounds in Cork, between Carbery and Duhallow West, in what was their first ever meeting in the final. Carbery won the match by 3–08 to 1–01 to claim their first ever championship title.

== Results ==
=== First round ===
4 April 1937 First round	Duhallow West	2-05 - 1-01	Fermoy	Mallow Gaelic Grounds

4 April 1937 First round	Carbery	2-06 - 0-06	Seandún	Bandon Grounds

18 April 1937 First round	Lees	0-02 - 2-06	Collins	The Mardyke

18 April 1937 First round	Macroom	0-07 - 1-05	Beara	Bantry Grounds

18 April 1937 First round	Imokilly	1-02 - 1-01	University College Cork	Midleton Grounds

- Clonakilty and Kilmurry received a bye in this round.

=== Second round ===
23 May 1937 Second round	Carbery	4-06 - 1-02	Imokilly	The Mardyke

30 May 1937 Second round	Kilmurry	0-02 - 0-02	Clonakilty	Dunmanway Grounds

4 July 1937 Second round	Collins	0-04 - 1-11	Beara	Bantry Grounds

4 July 1937 Second round replay	Kilmurry	1-01 - 0-01	Clonakilty	Enniskean Grounds

- Duhallow West received a bye in this round.

=== Semi-finals ===
8 August 1937 Semi-final	Duhallow West	3-02 - 1-03	Kilmurry	Castle Grounds

22 August 1937 Semi-final	Carbery	2-03 - 1-05	Beara	Bantry Grounds

=== Final ===
12 September 1937 Final	Carbery	3-08 - 1-01	Duhallow West	Cork Athletic Grounds
				Referee: J O'Regan

== Championship statistics ==
=== Miscellaneous ===
- The final between Carbery and Duhallow West was the first to feature two divisional teams.
