= 1952 Cork Senior Football Championship =

Gaelic football competition

- Dates: 6 April – 16 November 1952
- Teams: 23
- Champions: Clonakilty (7th title); T. Moriarty (captain)
- Runners-up: Collins; P. Kelly (captain)

Tournament statistics
- Matches played: 27
- Goals scored: 67 (2.48 per match)
- Points scored: 294 (10.89 per match)

The 1952 Cork Senior Football Championship was the 64th staging of the Cork Senior Football Championship since its establishment by the Cork County Board in 1887. The draw for the first round fixtures took place on 20 January 1952. The championship ran from 6 April to 16 November 1952.

Collins were the defending champions.

The final, a replay, was played on 16 November 1952 at the Athletic Grounds in Cork, between Clonakilty and Collins, in what was their first ever meeting in the final. Clonakilty won the match by 1–04 to 0–04 to claim their seventh championship title overall and a first title in five years.

== Team changes ==
=== To Championship ===
Promoted from the Cork Junior Football Championship

- Glanmire

== Results ==
=== First round ===
6 April 1952 First round	St Finbarr's	0-06 - 1-02	Imokilly	Páirc Uí Chonaill

13 April 1952 First round	Carbery	1-06 - 1-05	Seandún	Bandon Grounds

13 April 1952 First round	Canovee	3-07 - 1-03	Muskerry	Coachford Sportsfield

20 April 1952 First round	Fermoy	0-08 - 1-05	Clonakilty	Cork Athletic Grounds

20 April 1952 First round	St Nicholas'	2-02 - 0-07	St Vincent's	Cork Athletic Grounds

20 April 1952 First round	Macroom	1-05 - 3-05	Lees	Coachford Sportsfield

27 April 1952 First round	Avondhu	4-15 - 0-02	Commercials	FitzGerald Park

4 May 1952 First round	St Patrick's	1-01 - 2-13	Collins	Cork Athletic Grounds

4 May 1952 First round	University College Cork	3-08 - 0-02	Beara	Bantry Grounds

4 May 1952 First round replay	Fermoy	1-04 - 0-09	Clonakilty	Cork Athletic Grounds

11 May 1952 First round	Garda	2-07 - 2-07	Millstreet	Coachford Sportsfield

1 June 1952 First round replay	Garda	3-04 - 1-08	Millstreet	Coachford Sportsfield

1 June 1952 First round	Duhallow	1-09 - 0-00	Carrigdhoun	Cork Athletic Grounds

- Glanmire received a bye in this round.

=== Second round ===
1 June 1952 Second round	Glanmire	3-03 - 2-06	Clonakilty	Clonakilty Grounds

22 June 1952 Second round	Carbery	0-02 - 2-09	University College Cork	The Marsh

29 June 1952 Second round	Canovee	1-05 - 1-04	St Finbarr's	Coachford Sportsfield

29 June 1952 Second round	Lees	7-09 - 1-04	Avondhu	FitzGerald Park

1 August 1952 Second round	St Nicholas'	2-05 - 1-05	Garda	The Mardyke

3 August 1952 Second round	Collins	2-07 - 0-05	Duhallow	Millstreet Grounds

3 August 1952 Second round replay	Glanmire	1-03 - 1-09	Clonakilty	Cork Athletic Grounds

=== Third round ===
24 August 1952 Third round	Clonakilty	1-06 - 0-03	Canovee	Bandon Grounds

14 September 1952 Third round	St Nicholas'	2-04 - 0-05	University College Cork	Cork Athletic Grounds

- Collins and Lees received a bye in this round.

=== Semi-finals ===
28 September 1952 Semi-final	Collins	3-03 - 1-06	Lees	Cork Athletic Grounds

28 September 1952 Semi-final	Clonakilty	0-05 - 0-05	St Nicholas'	Bandon Grounds

5 October 1952 Semi-final replay	Clonakilty	0-06 - 0-04	St Nicholas'	Cork Athletic Grounds

=== Final ===
12 October 1952 Final	Clonakilty	1-05 - 0-08	Collins	Cork Athletic Grounds

=== Final replay ===
16 November 1952 Final	Clonakilty	1-04 - 0-04	Collins	Cork Athletic Grounds
