= 1927 Cork Senior Football Championship =

Gaelic football competition

- Dates: 27 March - 23 October 1927
- Teams: 10
- Champions: University College Cork (2nd title)
- Runners-up: Macroom

Tournament statistics
- Matches played: 9
- Goals scored: 25 (2.78 per match)
- Points scored: 48 (5.33 per match)

The 1927 Cork Senior Football Championship was the 39th staging of the Cork Senior Football Championship since its establishment by the Cork County Board in 1887. The draw for the opening round fixtures took place on 23 February 1927. The championship began on 27 March 1927 and ended on 23 October 1927.

Macroom entered the championship as the defending champions.

On 23 October 1927, University College Cork won the championship following a 3–03 to 1–00 defeat of Macroom in the final at the Cork Athletic Grounds. This was their second championship title overall and their first title since 1920.

== Results ==
Geraldines V Nils Nicks V UCC

27 March 1927 First round	Youghal	4-01 - 2-06	Collins	Killeagh Sportsfield

24 April 1927 First round	Lees	1-03 - 0-03	Buttevant	Mallow Town Park

1 May 1927 First round	Macroom	2-02 - 2-01	Fermoy	The Mardyke

22 May 1927 First round	University College Cork	1-05 - 0-02	St. Nicholas'	Cork Athletic Grounds

22 May 1927 First round	Nils	4-01 - 0-02	Geraldines	Cork Athletic Grounds

=== Second round ===
10 July 1927 Second round	Macroom	0-04 - 0-01	Nils	Bride Valley Grounds

=== Semi-finals ===
12 June 1927 Semi-final	Lees	0-00 - 3-07	University College Cork	The Mardyke

30 July 1927 Semi-final	Macroom	1-05 - 1-02	Youghal	Turners Cross

=== Final ===
23 October 1927 Final	University College Cork	3-03 - 1-00	Macroom	Cork Athletic Grounds
