= 1928 Cork Senior Football Championship =

Gaelic football competition

- Champions: University College Cork (3rd title)
- Runners-up: Duhallow United

The 1928 Cork Senior Football Championship was the 40th staging of the Cork Senior Football Championship since its establishment by the Cork County Board in 1887.

University College Cork entered the championship as the defending champions.

On 14 October 1928, University College Cork won the championship following a 1–06 to 0–02 defeat of Duhallow United in the final at The Mardyke. This was their third championship title overall and their second title in succession.

== Results ==
=== First round ===
25 March 1928 First round	Youghal	0-01 - 2-06	Collins	Mogeely Grounds

25 March 1928 First round	Duhallow United	2-04 - 0-02	Buttevant	Buttevant Grounds

1 April 1928 First round	Lees	0-01 - 0-06	Newmarket	Castle Grounds

1 April 1928 First round	Nils	0-00 - 2-09	University College Cork	Turners Cross

22 April 1928 First round	Urhan	1-01 - 1-00	Geraldines	Castletownbere Grounds

13 May 1928 First round	St Nicholas'	1-02 - 1-03	Macroom	Coachford Sportsfield

- Fermoy received a bye in this round.

=== Second round ===
13 May 1928 Second round	Fermoy	1-01 - 1-01	Duhallow United	Mallow Town Park

27 May 1928 Second round replay	Collins	w/o - scr.	Newmarket	Mallow Town Park

13 May 1928 Second round	Collins	1-01 - 1-01	Newmarket	Mallow Town Park

17 June 1928 Second round replay	Fermoy	0-03 - 0-05	Duhallow United	Mallow Town Park

24 June 1928 Second round	University College Cork	1-02- 0-03	Macroom	Killumney Grounds

- Urhan received a bye in this round.

=== Semi-finals ===
8 July 1928 Semi-final	Duhallow United	0-05 - 1-01	Urhan	Castle Grounds

22 July 1928 Semi-final	University College Cork	2-03 - 0-02	Collins	The Mardyke

=== Final ===
14 October 1928 Final	University College Cork	1-06 - 0-02	Duhallow United	The Mardyke
