= Seán Hayes (Gaelic footballer) =

Irish Gaelic footballer

Personal information
- Native name: Seán Ó hAodha (Irish)
- Born: 1960 (age 65–66) Cork, Ireland
- Occupation: Bank official

Sport
- Sport: Gaelic football
- Position: Centre-forward
Club
- Years: Club
- Nemo Rangers
Club titles
- Munster titles: 4
- All-Ireland Titles: 3
Inter-county*
Years	County	Apps (scores)
1981	Cork	2 (0-1)
Inter-county titles
- Munster titles: 0
- All-Irelands: 0
- NFL: 0
- All Stars: 0
- *Inter County team apps and scores correct as of 13:22, 31 July 2015.

Seán Hayes (born 1960) is an Irish retired Gaelic footballer who played as a centre-forward for the Cork senior team.

Born in Cork, Cleary first played competitive Gaelic football during his schooling at Coláiste Chríost Rí. He arrived on the inter-county scene at the age of seventeen when he first linked up with the Cork minor team before later joining the under-21 side. He made his senior debut during the 1981 championship..

At club level Hayes is a three-time All-Ireland medallist with Nemo Rangers. In addition to this he has also won four Munster medals and several championship medals.

Throughout his career Hayes made 2 championship appearances. He retired from inter-county football following the conclusion of the 1981 championship.

In retirement from playing Hayes became involved in team management and coaching. After coaching Youghal at club level he later became manager of the Cork under-21 team.

== Honours ==
=== Player ===
Nemo Rangers

- All-Ireland Senior Club Football Championship (3): 1979, (sub), 1982, 1984, 1989
- Munster Senior Club Football Championship (5): 1978, 1981, 1983, 1987 (sub), 1988
- Cork Senior Club Football Championship (5): 1978, 1981, 1983, 1987, 1988

Cork

- All-Ireland Under-21 Football Championship (2): 1980, 1981 (c)
- Munster Under-21 Football Championship (2): 1980, 1981 (c)

=== Manager ===
Cork

- Munster Under-21 Football Championship (1): 2014

Achievements
Preceded by Timmy Dalton	All-Ireland Under-21 Football Final winning captain 1981	Succeeded by Brian Tuohy
Sporting positions
Preceded by John Cleary	Cork Under-21 Football Manager; 2013-2018	Succeeded by Gene O'Driscoll
