= Jim Ahern (Gaelic footballer) =

Irish Gaelic footballer

Personal information
- Native name: Séamus Ó hEachtairn (Irish)
- Born: 17 October 1922 Clonakilty, County Cork, Ireland
- Died: 19 August 1988 (aged 65) Elm Park, Dublin, Ireland
- Occupation: Roman Catholic priest
- Height: 5 ft 8 in (173 cm)

Sport
- Sport: Gaelic Football
- Position: Centre-forward
Club
- Years: Club
- 1940s–1950s: Clonakilty
Club titles
- Cork titles: 6
Inter-county*
Years	County	Apps (scores)
1943–1948	Cork	9 (5–09)
Inter-county titles
- Munster titles: 2
- All-Irelands: 1
- NFL: 0
- *Inter County team apps and scores correct as of 18:21, 12 April 2012.

James Ahern (17 October 1922 – 19 August 1988) was an Irish Gaelic footballer who played as a left wing-back for the Cork senior team.

Ahern made his first appearance for the team during the 1943 championship and was a regular member of the starting fifteen over much of the next decade. During that time he won one All-Ireland medal and two Munster medals.

At club level Ahern was a multiple county championship medalist with Clonakilty. Ahern died in August 1988 at the age of 65.
