= Stephen Cronin =

Irish Gaelic footballer

Personal information
- Native name: Stiofán Ó Cróinín (Irish)
- Born: 13 October 1995 (age 31) Cork, Ireland

Sport
- Sport: Gaelic Football
- Position: Left corner-back
Club
- Years: Club
- Nemo Rangers
Club titles
- Cork titles: 1
College
- Years: College
- University College Cork
Inter-county*
Years	County	Apps (scores)
2015-2021	Cork	4 (0-00)
Inter-county titles
- Munster titles: 0
- All-Irelands: 0
- NFL: 0
- All Stars: 0
- *Inter County team apps and scores correct as of 18:48, 16 April 2016.

Stephen Cronin (born 13 October 1995) is an Irish Gaelic footballer who played as a left corner-back for the Cork senior team. In secondary school, he was on the Coláiste Chríost Rí team that won the Corn Uí Mhuirí in 2011. He was later captain of the Cork minor team. Cronin, who was on the Cork senior football panel from 2015 to 2021, plays club football with Nemo Rangers.
