= 1939 Cork Senior Football Championship =

Gaelic football competition

- Dates: 26 March – 12 November 1939
- Teams: 14
- Champions: Clonakilty (1st title); Pat Nyhan (captain)
- Runners-up: Beara

Tournament statistics
- Matches played: 12
- Goals scored: 44 (3.67 per match)
- Points scored: 111 (9.25 per match)

The 1939 Cork Senior Football Championship was the 51st staging of the Cork Senior Football Championship since its establishment by the Cork County Board in 1887. The draw for the opening round fixtures took place on 7 February 1939.

St. Nicholas' entered the championship as the defending champions, however, they were beaten by Beara in the semi-final.

On 12 November 1939, Clonakilty won the championship following a 0–07 to 0–05 defeat of Beara in the final at Skibbereen Town Park. This was their first championship title.

== Results ==
=== First round ===
26 March 1939 First round	Clonakilty	5-05 - 1-06	Carbery	Conakilty Sportsfield

26 March 1939 First round	Avondhu	3-03 - 5-03	Imokilly	Fermoy Sportsfield

2 April 1939 First round	University College Cork	3-01 - 2-01 (match abandoned)	Kilmurry	Coachford Sportsfield

16 April 1939 First round	Millstreet	3-04 - 2-02	Macroom	Millstreet Sportsfield

16 April 1939 First round	Dohenys	4-05 - 2-03	Bantry Blues	Drimoleague Sportsfield

23 April 1939 First round	Collins	1-02 - 1-07	Beara	Bantry Sportsfield

7 May 1939 First round	St. Nicholas'	2-05 - 1-06	Dromtarriffe	Mallow Town Park

=== Second round ===
21 May 1939 Second round	Clonakilty	2-01 - 0-06	imokilly	The Mardyke

28 May 1939 Second round	Dohenys	2-06 - 1-06 (declared void)	Beara	Bantry Sportsfield

24 September 1939 Second round	St. Nicholas'	3-14 - 0-05	Millstreet	Castle Grounds

- University College Cork received a bye in this round.

=== Semi-finals ===
2 July 1939 Semi-final	Clonakilty	1-06 - 1-05	University College Cork	Dunmanway Sportsfield

29 October 1939 Semi-final	Beara	0-09 - 2-02	St. Nicholas'	Dunmanway Sportsfield

=== Final ===
12 November 1939 Final	Clonakilty	0-07 - 0-05	Beara	Skibbereen Town Park
				Referee: J Murphy (Innishannon)

== Championship statistics ==
=== Miscellaneous ===
- Clonakilty win their first senior title having lost six for the last eight finals.
- The first round match between University College Cork and Kilmurry was abandoned seven minutes from full time after a dispute arose in the Kilmurry goalmouth and the spectators invaded the pitch. The match was subsequently awarded to UCC.
- The second-round game between Dohenys and Beara was declared void and game awarded to Beara after an objection over the use of illegal player by Dohenys was upheld.
