= 1942 Cork Senior Football Championship =

Gaelic football competition

- Dates: 12 April 1942 – 27 September 1942
- Teams: 19
- Champions: Clonakilty (2nd title); Tadhgo Crowley (captain)
- Runners-up: Fermoy

Tournament statistics
- Matches played: 17

The 1942 Cork Senior Football Championship was the 54th staging of the Cork Senior Football Championship since its establishment by the Cork County Board in 1887. The draw for the opening round fixtures took place on 25 January 1942. The championship began on 12 April 1942 and ended on 27 September 1942.

St. Nicholas' entered the championship as the defending champions, however, they surrendered their title after refusing to agree to a replay with Fermoy.

On 27 September 1942, Clonakilty won the championship following a 1–08 to 1–05 defeat of Fermoy in the final. This was their second championship title overall and their first title since 1939.

== Format change ==
A motion by Fermoy to divide the county into three divisions for the purpose of playing off the championship was passed by the County Convention. The three divisions effectively operated at local level and cut down on travel costs as a time when there was strict rationing of fuel.

== Results ==
=== Division 1 ===
12 April 1942 First round	O'Donovan Rossa	0-00 - 2-02	Bantry	Drimoleague Sportsfield

19 April 1942 First round	Dohenys	1-14 - 0-10	Beara	Skibberreen Town Park

26 April 1942 Second round	Clonakilty	2-07 - 0-02	Carbery	Clonakilty Sportsfield

31 May 1942 Second round	Bantry Blues	3-03 - 1-06 (declared void)	Dohenys	Skibberreen Town Park

5 July 1942 Second round replay	Bantry Blues	1-02 - 1-06	Dohenys	Skibberreen Town Park

9 August 1942 Third round	Clonakilty	1-06 - 0-05	Dohenys	Bandon Sportsfield

=== Division 2 ===
12 April 1942 First round	Macroom	3-04 - 1-03	Dromtarriffe	Millstreet Sportsfield

26 April 1942 First round	Ballincollig	4-06 - 0-03	Muskerry	Ballincollig Sportsfield

3 May 1942 First round	Millstreet	w/o - scr.	Duhallow	Kanturk Sportsfield

3 May 1942 Second round	Macroom	1-06 - 1-02	University College Cork	Coachford Sportsfield

24 May 1942 Second round	Millstreet	4-05 - 1-00	Ballincollig	Coachford Sportsfield

28 June 1942 Third round	Macroom	1-07 - 2-02 (declared void)	Millstreet	Coachford Sportsfield

=== Division 3 ===
12 April 1942 First round	Kickhams	3-03 - 3-02	Seandún	Riverstown Sportsfield

12 April 1942 First round	St. Nicholas'	(awarded to Fermoy)	Fermoy

19 April 1942 First round	Sarsfields	4-03 - 2-05	Collins	Cork Athletic Grounds

26 April 1942 First round	Avondhu	2-04 - 3-02	Midleton	Fermoy Sportsfield

21 June 1942 Second round	Fermoy	1-03 - 1-02	Kickhams	Fermoy Sportsfield

28 June 1942 Second round	Midleton	4-07 - 1-03	Sarsfields	Midleton Sportsfield

2 August 1942 Third round	Fermoy	5-04 - 2-03	Midleton	Riverstown Sportsfield

=== Semi-final ===
30 August 1942 Semi-final	Clonakilty	1-06 - 2-01	Millstreet	Coachford Sportsfield

=== Final ===
27 September 1942 Final	Clonakilty	1-08 - 1-05	Fermoy	The Mardyke
