= 1943 Cork Senior Football Championship =

Gaelic football competition

- Dates: 21 March – 17 October 1943
- Teams: 17
- Champions: Clonakilty (3rd title); Tadhgo Crowley (captain)
- Runners-up: Fermoy; Dave Magnier (captain)

Tournament statistics
- Matches played: 16
- Goals scored: 59 (3.69 per match)
- Points scored: 144 (9 per match)

The 1943 Cork Senior Football Championship was the 55th staging of the Cork Senior Football Championship since its establishment by the Cork County Board in 1887. The draw for the first round fixtures took place on 31 January 1943. The championship ran from 21 March to 17 October 1943.

Clonakilty were the defending champions.

The final was played on 17 October 1943 at the Mardyke in Cork, between Clonakilty and Fermoy, in what was their second consecutive meeting in the final. Clonakilty won the match by 2–05 to 1–04 to claim their third championship title overall and a second consecutive title.

== Group 1 ==
=== First round ===
21 March `943 First round	Kickhams	w/o - scr.	Midleton

11 April 1943 First round	Sarsfields	2-02 - 3-08	Combined Services	Riverstown Sportsfield

- Fermoy received a bye in this round.

=== Second round ===
23 May 1943 Second round	Fermoy	2-06 - 0-01	Combined Services	The Mardyke

- Kickhams received a bye in this round.

=== Third round ===
27 June 1943 Third round	Kickhams	1-07 - 1-03 (void)	Fermoy

12 September 1943 Third round replay	Kickhams	0-01 - 3-04	Fermoy	Fermoy Grounds

== Group 2 ==
=== First round ===
4 April 1943 First round	Seandún	1-04 - 1-04	University College Cork	The Mardyke

18 April 1943 First round	31st Battalion	2-04 - 5-00	Ballincollig	Ballincollig Grounds

16 May 1943 First round replay	Seandún	5-05 - 5-04	University College Cork	Cork Athletic Grounds

- St Nicholas' received a bye in this round.

=== Second round ===
23 May 1943 Second round	St Nicholas'	3-10 - 1-01	Ballincollig	The Mardyke

- Seandún received a bye in this round.

=== Third round ===
18 July 1943 Third round	Seandún	1-02 - 2-08	St Nicholas'	The Mardyke

== Group 3 ==
=== First round ===
3 May 1943 First round	MIllstreet	0-06 - 2-07	Macroom	Kanturk Grounds

- Duhallow received a bye in this round.

=== Second round ===
16 May 1943 First round	Duhallow	2-05 - 1-07	Macroom	Castle Grounds

== Group 4 ==
=== First round ===
11 April 1943 First round	Carbery	1-02 - 1-02	Dohenys	Dunmanway Grounds

First round replay	Dohenys	w/o - scr.	Carbery

23 May 1943 First round	Clonakilty	5-09 - 3-04	Beara	Bantry Grounds

=== Second round ===
27 June 1943 Second round	Clonakilty	2-08 - 2-04	Dohenys	Enniskeane Grounds

== Knockout stage ==
=== Semi-finals ===
29 August 1943 Semi-final	Duhallow	2-04 - 2-11	Clonakilty	Castle Grounds

3 October 1943 Semi-final	Fermoy	3-01 - 0-01	St Nicholas'	The Mardyke

=== Final ===
17 October 1943 Final	Clonakilty	2-05 - 1-04	Fermoy	The Mardyke
