= 1947 Cork Senior Football Championship =

Association football championship

- Dates: 20 April – 9 November 1947
- Teams: 16
- Champions: Clonakilty (6th title); Mick Finn (captain)
- Runners-up: St. Nicholas'

Tournament statistics
- Matches played: 15
- Goals scored: 50 (3.33 per match)
- Points scored: 175 (11.67 per match)

The 1947 Cork Senior Football Championship was the 59th staging of the Cork Senior Football Championship since its establishment by the Cork County Board in 1887. The draw for the first round fixtures took place on 26 January 1947. The championship ran from 20 April to 9 November 1947.

Clonakilty were the defending champions.

The final was played on 9 November 1947 at the Athletic Grounds in Cork, between Clonakilty and St Nicholas', in what was their second meeting in the final overall. Clonakilty won the match by 2–05 to 1–04 to claim their sixth championship title overall and a second consecutive title.

== Results ==
=== First round ===
20 April 1947 First round	St Patrick's	0-07 - 1-03	Seandún	The Mardyke

4 May 1947 First round	Beara	2-08 - 1-06	Macroom	Bantry Grounds

11 May 1947 First round	Commercials	2-10 - 1-07	Muskerry	Macroom Grounds

11 May 1947 First round	Duhallow	1-04 - 3-12	St Nicholas'	Macroom Grounds

11 May 1947 First round	Clonakilty	1-09 - 0-03	St Finbarr's	Kinsale Grounds

11 May 1947 First round	Fermoy	4-08 - 0-03	Carbery	The Mardyke

11 May 1947 First round	St Vincent's	1-04 - 1-06	Army	The Mardyke

First round	Millstreet	w/o - scr.	Mitchelstown

=== Second round ===
1 June 1947 Second round	St Patrick's	2-02 - 2-06	St Nicholas'	The Mardyke

10 August 1947 Second round	Beara	2-10 - 1-08	Commercials	Bantry Grounds

17 August 1947 Second round	Clonakilty	4-05 - 2-04	Millstreet	Macroom Grounds

14 September 1947 Second round	Fermoy	2-03 - 2-03	Army	Fermoy Athletic Grounds

12 October 1947 Second round replay	Fermoy	2-06 - 3-05	Army	Camp Field

=== Semi-finals ===
31 August 1947 Semi-final	Clonakilty	2-06 - 0-07	Beara	Macroom Grounds

26 October 1947 Semi-final	St Nicholas'	2-08 - 3-03	Army	Camp Field

=== Final ===
9 November 1947 Final	Clonakilty	2-05 - 1-04	St Nicholas'	Cork Athletic Grounds
