= 1944 Cork Senior Football Championship =

Gaelic football competition

- Dates: 30 April – 15 October 1944
- Teams: 16
- Champions: Clonakilty (4th title); Tadhgo Crowley (captain)
- Runners-up: Fermoy; Dave Magnier (captain)

Tournament statistics
- Matches played: 15
- Goals scored: 47 (3.13 per match)
- Points scored: 138 (9.2 per match)

The 1944 Cork Senior Football Championship was the 56th staging of the Cork Senior Football Championship since its establishment by the Cork County Board in 1887. The draw for the first round fixtures took place on 30 January 1944. The championship ran from 30 April to 15 October 1944.

Clonakilty were the defending champions.

The final, a replay, was played on 15 October 1944 at the Mardyke in Cork, between Clonakilty and Fermoy, in what was their third consecutive meeting in the final. Clonakilty won the match by 1–09 to 1–05 to claim their fourth championship title overall and a third consecutive title.

== Group 1 ==
=== Round 1 ===
7 May 1944 First round	Sarsfields	0-01 - 2-04	4th Battalion	Riverstown Sportsfield

- Fermoy received a bye in this round.

=== Round 2 ===
21 May 1944 Second round	Fermoy	2-08 - 0-03	4th Battalion	Fermoy Sports Ground

== Group 2 ==
=== First round ===
7 May 1944 First round	St Finbarr's	3-06 - 1-11	Army	The Mardyke

14 May 1944 First round	University College Cork	3-05 - 2-09	St Nicholas'	The Mardyke

=== Second round ===
23 July 1944 Second round	St Finbarr's	1-06 - 1-01	St Nicholas'	The Mardyke

== Group 3 ==
=== First round ===
21 May 1944 First round	Duhallow	w/o - scr.	Muskerry	Millstreet Grounds

21 May 1944 First round	Dromtarriffe	2-03 - 3-06	Macroom	Millstreet Grounds

=== Second round ===
9 July 1944 Second round	Macroom	0-04 - 2-04	Duhallow	Millstreet Grounds

== Group 4 ==
=== First round ===
30 April 1944 First round	Bere Island	1-05 - 0-04	Beara	Castletownbere Grounds

4 June 1944 First round	Clonakilty	2-03 - 0-01	Dohenys	Bandon Grounds

=== Second round ===
14 May 1944 Second round	Carbery	2-03 - 1-03	Bere Island	Bantry Grounds

- Clonnakilty received a bye in this round.

=== Third round ===
25 June 1944 Third round	Clonakilty	6-07 - 2-01	Carbery	Clonakilty Grounds

== Knockout stage ==
=== Semi-finals ===
6 August 1944 Semi-final	Duhallow	0-01 - 4-09	Clonakilty	The Mardyke

27 August 1944 Semi-final	Fermoy	4-05 - 0-04	St Finbarr's	The Mardyke

=== Final ===
10 September 1944 Final	Clonakilty	1-02 - 0-05	Fermoy	The Mardyke

=== Final replay ===
15 October 1944 Final replay	Clonakilty	1-09 - 1-05	Fermoy	The Mardyke

== Championship statistics ==
=== Miscellaneous ===
- The first round match between Duhallow and Muskerry failed to take place, due to transport issues for the Muskerry team.
- Clonakilty became the first side team Beara (1932–34) to win three titles in-a-row.
