= 1951 Cork Senior Football Championship =

Gaelic football competition

- Dates: 1 April – 21 October 1951
- Teams: 22
- Champions: Collins (3rd title); Paddy Cronin (captain)
- Runners-up: St Nicholas'; Jimmy Lynam (captain)

Tournament statistics
- Matches played: 22
- Goals scored: 71 (3.23 per match)
- Points scored: 235 (10.68 per match)

The 1951 Cork Senior Football Championship was the 63rd staging of the Cork Senior Football Championship since its establishment by the Cork County Board in 1887.

Garda were the defending champions, however, they were beaten by St Nicholas' in the semi-finals.

On 21 October 1951, Collins won the championship following a 2–03 to 1–05 defeat of St. Nicholas' in the final at the Cork Athletic Grounds. This was their third championship title overall and their first title since 1949.

== Results ==
=== First round ===
1 April 1951 First round	St Vincent's	2-04 - 1-02	Imokilly	Páirc Uí Chonaill

1 April 1951 First round	Garda	1-08 - 0-02	Millstreet	Coachford Sportsfield

1 April 1951 First round	St Patrick's	2-06 - 2-03	Castlemagner	Bishop Casey Memorial Park

8 April 1951 First round	Duhallow	2-06 - 3-08	Carrigdhoun	Cork Athletic Grounds

15 April 1951 First round	Beara	2-02 - 2-01	Avondhu	Páirc Naomh Abán

15 April 1951 First round	Collins	2-11 - 1-08	Fermoy	Cork Athletic Grounds

15 April 1951 First round	Carbery	1-02 - 0-09	University College Cork	Bandon Grounds

22 April 1951 First round	Clonakilty	4-06 - 0-01	Seandún	Enniskeane Grounds

22 April 1951 First round	Lees	0-10 - 1-03	Commercials	Cork Athletic Grounds

29 April 1951 First round	St Nicholas'	3-09 - 1-06	Canovee	Coachford Sportsfield

6 May 1951 First round	Macroom	1-07 - 3-04	St Finbarr's	Coachford Sportsfield

=== Second round ===
11 May 1951 Second round	Collins	1-10 - 2-05	University College Cork	The Mardyke

13 May 1951 Second round	Garda	0-06 - 0-01	St Patrick's	Cork Athletic Grounds

20 May 1951 Second round	St Nicholas'	3-10 - 2-05	St Finbarr's	Cork Athletic Grounds

20 May 1951 Second round	Lees	2-06 - 0-02	Carrigdhoun	Carrigaline Grounds

27 May 1951 Second round	Clonakilty	2-06 - 2-03	Beara	Bantry Grounds

- St Vincent's received a bye in this round.

=== Third round ===
19 August 1951 Third round	Clonakilty	1-08 - 2-04	Lees	Cork Athletic Grounds

16 September 1951 Third round	Collins	2-09 - 2-04	St Vincent's	Cork Athletic Grounds

- St Nicholas' received a bye in this round.

=== Semi-finals ===
2 September 1951 Semi-final	Clonakilty	2-03 - 1-06	Collins	Bandon Grounds

14 October 1951 Semi-final	Garda	1-05 - 4-03	St Nicholas'	Cork Athletic Grounds

14 October 1951 Semi-final replay	Clonakilty	2-09 - 3-04	Collins	Bandon Grounds

=== Final ===
21 October 1951 Final	Collins	2-03 - 1-05	St Nicholas'	Cork Athletic Grounds
