= 1946 Cork Senior Football Championship =

Gaelic football competition

- Dates: 7 April – 24 November 1946
- Teams: 16
- Champions: Clonakilty (5th title); Dessie Cullinane (captain)
- Runners-up: Fermoy; Dave Magnier (captain)

Tournament statistics
- Matches played: 13
- Goals scored: 30 (2.31 per match)
- Points scored: 141 (10.85 per match)

The 1946 Cork Senior Football Championship was the 58th staging of the Cork Senior Football Championship since its establishment by the Cork County Board in 1887. The draw for the first round fixtures took place on 27 January 1946. The championship ran from 7 April to 24 November 1946.

Fermoy were the defending champions.

The final was played on 24 November 1946 at the Athletic Grounds in Cork, between Clonakilty and Fermoy, in what was their fifth consecutive meeting in the final. Clonakilty won the match by 1–02 to 0–03 to claim their fifth championship title overall and a first title in two years.

== Results ==
=== First round ===
7 April 1946 First round	Fermoy	1-10 - 0-00	Duhallow	Buttevant Grounds

14 April 1946 First round	Carbery	0-01 - 2-03	Commercials	Bandon Grounds

14 April 1946 First round	Millstreet	1-04 - 1-03	Kilmurry	Macroom Grounds

5 May 1946 First round	Army	2-09 - 0-04	Macroom	Crookstown Grounds

5 May 1946 First round	Seandún	1-03 - 2-05	St Finbarr's	The Mardyke

26 May 1946 First round	Mitchelstown	1-04 - 3-05	Beara	The Mardyke

First round	St Nicholas'	w/o - scr.	Dohenys

First round	Clonakilty	w/o - scr.	Collins

=== Second round ===
30 June 1946 Second round	Army	2-08 - 2-01	Beara	Glengarriff Grounds

7 July 1946 Second round	St Finbarr's	2-10 - 2-07	Millstreet	Coachford Sportsfield

4 August 1946 Second round	Fermoy	1-10 - 1-04	Commercials	Mitchelstown Athletic Grounds

18 August 1946 Second round	Clonakilty	3-05 - 0-08	St Nicholas'	Kinsale Grounds

=== Semi-finals ===
8 September 1946 Semi-final	Fermoy	0-06 - 1-02	St Finbarr's	The Mardyke

8 September 1946 Semi-final	Clonakilty	1-14 - 0-06	Army	The Mardyke

=== Final ===
24 November 1946 Final	Clonakilty	1-02 - 0-03	Fermoy	Cork Athletic Grounds
				Referee: S Deignan (Cavan)
