= 1911 All-Ireland Senior Football Championship final =

- Event: 1911 All-Ireland Senior Football Championship
Cork	Antrim
6–6 (24)	1–2 (5)
- Date: 14 January 1912
- Venue: Jones' Road, Dublin
- Referee: M. O'Brennan (Roscommon)
- Attendance: 13,000

The 1911 All-Ireland Senior Football Championship final was a Gaelic football match played at Jones's Road on 14 January 1912 to determine the winners of the 1911 All-Ireland Senior Football Championship, the 25th season of the All-Ireland Senior Football Championship, a tournament organised by the Gaelic Athletic Association for the champions of the four provinces of Ireland. The final was contested by Cork of Munster who were represented by Lees and Antrim of Ulster who were represented by Seaghan an Diomáis, with Cork winning by 6–6 to 1–2.

== Match ==
=== Summary ===
The All-Ireland SFC final between Cork and Antrim was notable for a number of firsts. Not only was it the first appearance by an Ulster team in the All-Ireland SFC final, but it was also the first ever, and, to date, the only, championship meeting of Cork and Antrim.

Antrim started well by scoring the first goal of the game. Charlie Paye replied, while Billy Mackessy followed with a goal at the start of the second half. The final quarter saw Cork score four goals in all, including two more from Mackessy, who recorded the first All-Ireland SFC hat-trick. Some commentators claimed that one of Cork's six goals should have been awarded as a point.

Cork's All-Ireland SFC title win was their first since 1890. It was Cork's second All-Ireland SFC title overall, and put the team joint fourth on the all-time roll of honour, alongside Limerick.

The 19-point winning margin for Cork remains a record for an All-Ireland SFC final.

=== Details ===
14 January 1912

Cork	6–6 – 1–2	Antrim

Jones's Road, Dublin
Attendance: 11,000
Referee: M. O'Brennan (Roscommon)

Cork
M Mehigan (c)
M O’Shea (goal.)
E Barrett
J A Beckett
J O’Driscoll
J Donovan
W Mackessy
M Cotter
T Murphy
J Lehane
W Lehane
J Lynch
C Kelleher
J Young
P O'Connell
C Paye	Substituted off
J O’Neill	Substituted off
Substitutes:
P McSweeney	Substituted on
T Breen	Substituted on

Antrim
H Sheehan (c)
H Kane (goal.)
J Murphy
P Barnes
J Mulvihill
P Moylan
P L Kelly
J M Darby
C McCurry
J Fegan
J Mullen
E Gorman
J Healy
J Coburn
W Manning
P Meany
W Williams
