= John Lynch (Cork Gaelic footballer) =

Irish Gaelic footballer

Personal information
- Native name: Seán Ó Loingsigh (Irish)
- Born: 2 May 1890 Macroom, County Cork, Ireland
- Died: 6 November 1930 (aged 40) Macroom, County Cork, Ireland
- Occupation: Draper

Sport
- Sport: Gaelic Football
- Position: Right corner-back
Club
- Years: Club
- Macroom
Club titles
- Cork titles: 4
Inter-county
- Years: County
- 1910-1914: Cork
Inter-county titles
- Munster titles: 1
- All-Irelands: 1

John Lynch (2 May 1890 – 6 November 1930) was an Irish Gaelic footballer who played for Cork Senior Championship club Macroom. He played for the Cork senior football team for five seasons, during which time he usually lined out as a right corner-back.

== Honours ==
Macroom

- Cork Senior Football Championship (4): 1909, 1910, 1912, 1913

Cork

- All-Ireland Senior Football Championship (1): 1911
- Munster Senior Football Championship (1): 1911
