= Mark Farr =

Irish retired Gaelic footballer

Personal information
- Native name: Marc Ó Farraigh (Irish)
- Born: 1968 (age 57–58) Dunmanway, County Cork, Ireland
- Height: 6 ft 1 in (185 cm)

Sport
- Sport: Gaelic football
- Position: Right corner-back
Clubs
- Years: Club
- Dohenys → Carbery
Club titles
- Cork titles: 0
Inter-county*
Years	County	Apps (scores)
1993-1997	Cork	12 (0-00)
Inter-county titles
- Munster titles: 3
- All-Irelands: 0
- NFL: 0
- All Stars: 0
- *Inter County team apps and scores correct as of 01:53, 28 June 2017.

Mark Farr (born 1968) is an Irish former Gaelic footballer. At club level, he played with Dohenys, divisional side Carbery, and at inter-county level, with various Cork teams.

== Career ==
Farr first played Gaelic football at juvenile and underage levels with the Dohenys club in Dunmanway. He was just 16-years-old when he made his adult debut for the club's third team in 1984. Farr later won back-to-back West Cork JAFC, before claiming a Cork JAFC medal after a defeat of Carrigtwohill in 1993. His performances for the club resulted in a call-up to the Carbery divisional team. Farr later added a Cork IFC medal to his collection in 1995.

At inter-county level, Farr first appeared for Cork as a member of the minor team that lost the 1986 All-Ireland minor final to Galway. He later won a Munster U21FC as a member of the extended panel in 1989. By that stage, Farr had already joined the junior team and won the first of four Munster JFC medals in 1988. He claimed back-to-back All-Ireland JFC medals as a substitute in 1989 and on the field of play in 1990.

After impressing for the junior team, Farr joined the Cork senior football team in 1993. He won the first of three Munster SFC medals that season and was an unused substitute when Cork were beaten by Derry in the 1993 All-Ireland final. Farr was also selected for Munster's Railway Cup team during this period. He made his last appearance for Cork as an unused substitute in a defeat by Clare in 1997.

== Honours ==
Dohenys

- Cork Intermediate Football Championship: 1995
- Cork Junior A Football Championship: 1993
- West Cork Junior A Football Championship: 1992, 1993

Cork

- Munster Senior Football Championship: 1993, 1994, 1995
- All-Ireland Junior Football Championship: 1989, 1990
- Munster Junior Football Championship: 1988, 1989, 1990, 1992
- Munster Under-21 Football Championship: 1989
- Munster Minor Football Championship: 1986
