= Thade Murphy =

Irish Gaelic footballer

Personal information
- Native name: Tadhg Ó Murchú (Irish)
- Nickname: Thade
- Born: Timothy Murphy; 8 March 1888 Inchigeelagh, County Cork, Ireland
- Died: 20 January 1975 (aged 86) Macroom, County Cork, Ireland
- Occupation: Carpenter

Sport
- Sport: Gaelic Football
- Position: Goalkeeper
Club
- Years: Club
- Macroom
Club titles
- Cork titles: 4
Inter-county
- Years: County
- 1909-1914: Cork
Inter-county titles
- Munster titles: 1
- All-Irelands: 1

Timothy Murphy (8 March 1888 – 20 January 1975), known as Thade Murphy, was an Irish Gaelic footballer who played as a goalkeeper for club side Macroom and was a member of the Cork senior football team from 1909 until 1914.

== Career ==
Murphy first came to Gaelic football prominence as a goalkeeper with the Macroom club that won four County Championship titles in five seasons between 1909 and 1913. He joined the Cork senior football team as a goalkeeper in advance of the 1909 Munster Championship. Murphy subsequently lined out in the 1911 All-Ireland final which saw Cork claim their second ever title after a 6–06 to 1–02 defeat of Antrim. He continued to line out with Cork until 1914.

== Personal life and death ==
Born in Inchigeelagh, County Cork, Murphy followed in his father's footsteps and worked as a carpenter. He took a prominent part in the War of Independence as a member of the 7th Batt. 1st Cork Brigade of the Old IRA and subsequently took the Anti-Treaty side. He was a life-long supporter of Éamon de Valera and Fianna Fáil. Murphy married Nellie Cross in Enniskean on 23 September 1922 and they had three children. One of his sons, John A. Murphy, was Emeritus Professor of Irish History at University College Cork and senator.

Murphy died in Macroom on 20 January 1975. He was the second-last surviving member of the 1911 All-Ireland-winning team.

== Honours ==
Macroom

- Cork Senior Football Championship: 1909, 1910, 1912, 1913

Cork

- All-Ireland Senior Football Championship: 1911
- Munster Senior Football Championship: 1911
