= Bill Lehane =

Irish Gaelic footballer

Personal information
- Native name: Liam Ó Liatháin (Irish)
- Born: 18 June 1890 Macroom, County Cork, Ireland
- Died: 24 March 1948 (aged 57) Cork, Ireland
- Occupation: Medical doctor

Sport
- Sport: Gaelic Football
- Position: Forward
Club
- Years: Club
- Macroom
Club titles
- Cork titles: 4
Inter-county
- Years: County
- 1909-1913: Cork
Inter-county titles
- Munster titles: 1
- All-Irelands: 1

William Lehane (18 June 1890 – 24 March 1958) was an Irish Gaelic footballer who played as a forward for club side Macroom and was a member of the Cork senior football team from 1909 until 1913.

== Honours ==
Macroom

- Cork Senior Football Championship: 1909, 1910, 1912, 1913

Cork

- All-Ireland Senior Football Championship: 1911
- Munster Senior Football Championship: 1911
