= Colman Corrigan =

Irish former sportsperson

Personal information
- Native name: Colmán Ó Corragáin (Irish)
- Nickname: COS
- Born: 5 June 1962 (age 64) Macroom, County Cork, Ireland
- Occupation: Insurance broker
- Height: 6 ft 0 in (183 cm)

Sport
- Sport: Gaelic football
- Position: Full-back
Clubs
- Years: Club
- 1980-1992 1980-1982; 1987-1990: Macroom → Muskerry
Club titles
- Cork titles: 0
Inter-county
Years	County	Apps (scores)
1982-1990	Cork	22 (0-01)
Inter-county titles
- Munster titles: 5
- All-Irelands: 2
- NFL: 1
- All Stars: 2

Colman Corrigan (born 5 June 1962) is an Irish former Gaelic footballer, selector and manager. At club level he played with Macroom, divisional side Muskerry and at inter-county level with the Cork senior football team. Corrigan also served in a number of management roles at club and inter-county levels.

== Early life ==
Born and raised in Macroom, County Cork, Corrigan first played as a schoolboy in various juvenile competitions at St. Colman's Boys National School before later lining out as a student at the De La Salle College. Here he won under-15 Cork and Munster 'B' championships, under-17 Cork and Munster 'B' championships and was on the De La Salle team beaten by Coláiste Chríost Rí in the Corn Uí Mhuirí final in 1978.

== Club career ==
Corrigan began his club career with the St. Colman's juvenile club and progressed through the ranks from under-12 to minor. During these years he won an under-16 county section and minor county section medals. He was in his final year of minor grade activity in 1980 when he was drafted onto the Macroom intermediate team as well as being called up to the Muskerry divisional team.

Corrigan enjoyed his first success at adult level when he lined out at midfield in Macroom's defeat of Bandon in the 1982 Cork IFC final. Later that season he captained the Macroom under-21 team to their very first Cork U21FC title after a defeat of St. Finbarr's in the final.

Macroom failed to get past the quarter-final stage during their time in the Cork SFC and regraded after a number of years. Corrigan won a second Cork IFC title after a six-point win over Castletownbere in the 1990 final. He continued to line out for another few years before retiring after a defeat by Aghada in the quarter-final of the 1992 Cork SFC.

== Inter-county career ==
Corrigan began a two-year association with the Cork minor football team as a 16-year-old right wing-back for the 1979 Munster MFC. He was moved to right corner-back and centre-forward the following year, however, his two seasons with the team ended with consecutive Munster final defeats by Kerry. Corrigan immediately progressed to the under-21 team and ended his debut season in that grade with an All-Ireland U21FC title after a defeat of Galway in the 1981 final replay. He won a second consecutive Munster U21FC in 1982 before serving as under-21 team captain in his third and final season in 1983.

Corrigan was in his second year with the under-21 team when he earned a call-up to the senior team for the 1982 Munster SFC. He came on as a substitute in that year's Munster final replay defeat by Kerry. Corrigan claimed his first senior silverware when he lined out at midfield in Cork's 3–10 to 3–09 defeat of Kerry in the 1983 Munster final.

After losing the next three Munster finals to Kerry, Corrigan claimed a second provincial winners' medal after Kerry were beaten in a replay in 1987. He was again at full-back when Cork suffered a 1–14 to 0–11 defeat by Meath in the 1987 All-Ireland final. In spite of the defeat, Corrigan ended the season by being named as the All-Star full-back. He collected a third Munster winners' medal when Cork retained the title in 1988, however, he later ended up on the losing for a second consecutive year as Meath beat Cork in the 1988 All-Ireland final replay. Corrigan was once again named as the All-Star fill-back.

Corrigan added a National League medal to his collection in 1989, however, the final victory over New York did not pass without incident as he suffered a severe leg injury. It was later revealed that he had damaged the Achilles tendon in his right leg and underwent surgery at Tralee General Hospital immediately after arriving back in Ireland. The injury ruled Corrigan out of the 1989 All-Ireland SFC, however, he remained part of the extended panel as Cork secured the title after a defeat of Mayo in the All-Ireland final.

For a time, it looked as if Corrigan's career was over as a result of the injury, however, he returned to the Cork team during the 1989-90 National League. He later came on as a substitute in Cork's opening round defeat of Limerick in the 1990 Munster SFC. It was his only championship appearance that season as Corrigan was an unused substitute for Cork's subsequent Munster final defeat of Kerry. He was also listed amongst the substitutes when Cork beat Meath by 0–11 to 0–09 in the 1990 All-Ireland final. Corrigan was again part of the Cork panel for the early stages of the 1990-91 National League, however, a persistent knee injury resulted in him stepping away for the team.

== Management career ==
Corrigan had just brought an end to his inter-county career when he became coach of the Cork junior football team in 1992. Success was instant with Cork securing the Munster JFC title before losing the 1992 All-Ireland junior final to Wexford. After bringing his club career to and in 1992, Corrigan continued his involvement with his hometown club by taking over as the Macroom coach. He enjoyed little success in this role before taking charge of the Muskerry divisional team in 1995. Corrigan's sole season in charge saw Muskerry reach the final of the 1995 Cork SFC where they were beaten by Bantry Blues.

Corrigan was appointed assistant coach of the Cork senior team under Billy Morgan during the latter's unsuccessful final season in charge in 1996. He simultaneously took charge of the Kanturk junior team that season before returning as Muskerry coach in 1997. Corrigan joined the Killavullen club as coach the following year and guided the team to consecutive North Cork JAFC titles as well as a Cork JAFC final appearance.

Corrigan returned to the Cork senior team as part of Billy Morgan's management team in 2003. He spent two largely unsuccessful seasons with the team before once again returning to Macroom where he served as team manager and selector over the following few seasons. Corrigan was a selector when Macroom beat Kildorrery by 1–09 to 0–10 to win the 2010 Cork IFC title.

== Honours ==
=== Player ===
Macroom

- Cork Intermediate Football Championship: 1982, 1990
- Cork Under-21 Football Championship: 1982 (c)

Cork

- All-Ireland Senior Football Championship: 1989, 1990
- Munster Senior Football Championship: 1983, 1987, 1988, 1989, 1990
- National Football Leagie: 1988-89
- All-Ireland Under-21 Football Championship: 1981
- Munster Under-21 Football Championship: 1981, 1982

=== Management ===
Killavullen

- North Cork Junior A Football Championship: 1998, 1999

Macroom

- Cork Intermediate Football Championship: 2010

Cork

- Munster Junior Football Championship: 1992

Sporting positions
Preceded by Mick Burns	Cork under-21 football team captain 1983	Succeeded by Niall Cahalane
