= Ger Manley =

Cork hurler and Gaelic footballer

Personal information
- Native name: Gearóid Ó Manlaí (Irish)
- Born: 13 January 1968 (age 58) Inniscarra, County Cork, Ireland
- Occupation: Prison officer
- Height: 5 ft 10 in (178 cm)

Sport
- Sport: Hurling
- Position: Left corner-forward
Clubs
Years	Club	Apps (scores)
1985–1992 1987–1992 1993–2006	Inniscarra → Muskerry; Midleton	11 (5–46); 29 (7–54)
Inter-county
Years	County	Apps (scores)
1987–1997	Cork	8 (3–10)
Inter-county titles
- Munster titles: 1
- All-Irelands: 0
- NHL: 1
- All Stars: 0

Gerard Manley (born 13 January 1968) is an Irish former hurler and Gaelic footballer. At club level he played with Inniscarra, Midleton and Muskerry and was also a member of the Cork senior hurling team.

== Playing career ==
Manley first played Gaelic football and hurling with the Inniscarra club. He won a Mid Cork JAFC title with the club in 1989, while he also lined out with the Muskerry divisional team as a dual player. Manley first appeared on the inter-county scene as a member of the Cork minor team that won the 1985 All-Ireland MHC title. He progressed onto the under-21 team and was at centre-forward on the team that beat Kilkenny in the 1988 All-Ireland Under-21 HC final. Manley made his senior team debut against Waterford during the 1987–88 league; however, it took a number of years before he established himself on the team. In the meantime, he won an All-Ireland JFC with the Cork junior football team in 1990. Manley won a Munster SHC in 1992; however, Cork lost the subsequent All-Ireland SHC final to Kilkenny. He added a National League title to his collection in 1993. Manley ended his club career as a goalkeeper with Midleton.

== Managerial career ==
Manley first became involved in team management and coaching at various level with Midleton. He was a selector with the Cork under-21 hurling team that was beaten by Tipperary in the 2007 All-Ireland MHC final. Manley subsequently spent two years as manager of the team. He later took charge of a number of club sides, including Kilbree and Slieve Bloom.

In December 2023, Manley was announced as the manager of the Cork senior camogie team. He had roles with the side under previous manager, Matthew Twomey, and was appointed for a two-year term, for the 2024 and 2025 seasons.

== Honours ==
=== Player ===
Inniscarra

- Mid Cork Junior A Football Championship: 1989

Cork

- Munster Senior Hurling Championship: 1992
- All-Ireland Junior Football Championship: 1990
- Munster Junior Football Championship: 1988, 1990, 1992
- Munster Junior Hurling Championship: 1992
- All-Ireland Under-21 Hurling Championship: 1988
- Munster Under-21 Hurling Championship: 1988
- All-Ireland Minor Hurling Championship: 1985
- Munster Minor Hurling Championship: 1985, 1986

Munster

- Railway Cup: 1995, 1996

=== Manager ===
Kilbree

- South West Junior A Hurling Championship: 2016, 2018

Cork

- Munster Minor Hurling Championship: 2008

Sporting positions
Preceded by Don Cronin	Cork minor hurling team manager 2007–2009	Succeeded by John Considine
Preceded by Matthew Twomey	Cork senior camogie team manager 2023–	Succeeded by Incumbent
Achievements
Preceded by Matthew Twomey	All-Ireland SCC final winning manager 2024	Succeeded by Incumbent
