= 1936 Cork Senior Football Championship =

Gaelic football competition

- Dates: 8 March – 16 August 1936
- Teams: 11
- Champions: Duhallow West (1st title); Dick Harnedy (captain)
- Runners-up: Clonakilty; Pakie Nyhan (captain)

Tournament statistics
- Matches played: 10
- Goals scored: 21 (2.1 per match)
- Points scored: 67 (6.7 per match)

The 1936 Cork Senior Football Championship was the 48th staging of the Cork Senior Football Championship since its establishment by the Cork County Board in 1887. The draw for the first round fixtures took place on 26 January 1936. The championship ran from 8 March to 16 August 1936.

Macroom were the defending champions, however, they were beaten by Clonakilty in the second round.

The final was played on 16 August 1936 at the Mardyke in Cork, between Duhallow West and Clonakilty, in what was their first ever meeting in the final. Duhallow West won the match by 2–05 to 0–02 to claim their first ever championship title.

== Results ==
=== First round ===
8 March 1936 First round	Seandún	1-03 - 1-07	University College Cork	Douglas Grounds

19 April 1936 First round	Duhallow West	4-05 - 0-04	Beara	Castle Grounds

26 April 1936 First round	Carbery	1-04 - 1-00	Imokilly	Cork Athletic Grounds

3 May 1936 First round	Lees	1-02 - 2-05	Macroom	The Mardyke

3 May 1936 First round	Kilmurry	3-02 - 0-02	Collins	Ballincollig Grounds

- Clonakilty received a bye in this round.

=== Second round ===
10 May 1936 Second round	Duhallow West	1-05 - 0-05	University College Cork	Castle Grounds

31 May 1936 Second round	Carbery	1-04 - 0-02	Kilmurry	Bandon Grounds

7 June 1936 Second round	Clonakilty	1-04 - 1-01	Macroom	The Mardyke

=== Semi-final ===
19 July 1936 Semi-final	Clonakilty	1-02 - 0-04	Carbery	Clonakilty Showgrounds

- Duhallow West received a bye in this round.

=== Final ===
16 August 1936 Final	Duhallow West	2-05 - 0-02	Clonakilty	The Mardyke
