= 1940 Cork Senior Football Championship =

Gaelic football competition

- Dates: 31 March 1940 – 15 September 1940
- Teams: 17
- Champions: Beara (4th title); D. O'Sullivan (captain)
- Runners-up: Millstreet

Tournament statistics
- Matches played: 15
- Goals scored: 56 (3.73 per match)
- Points scored: 146 (9.73 per match)

The 1940 Cork Senior Football Championship was the 52nd staging of the Cork Senior Football Championship since its establishment by the Cork County Board in 1887. The draw for the opening round fixtures took place on 28 January 1940. The championship began on 31 March 1940 and ended on 15 September 1940.

Clonakilty were the defending champions, however, they were beaten by Beara at the quarter-final stage.

On 15 September 1940, Beara won the championship following a 2–08 to 1–07 defeat of Millstreet in the final at Skibbereen Town Park. This was their fourth championship title overall and their first title since 1934.

== Results ==
=== First round ===
31 March 1940 First round	Collins	4-04 - 2-04	Avondhu	Mallow Town Park

14 April 1940 First round	Dohenys	2-05 - 3-08	Beara	Bantry Sportsfield

14 April 1940 First round	Seandún	1-03 - 2-07	Duhallow	Millstreet Sportsfield

21 April 1940 First round	Clonakilty	3-04 - 0-01	Kilmurry	Dunmanway Sportsfield

28 April 1940 First round	Imokilly	2-01 - 3-06	St. Nicholas'	Castlemartyr Sportsfield

12 May 1940 First round	Macroom	3-03 - 3-07	Midleton	The Mardyke

12 May 1940 First round	Carbery	2-04 - 5-03	Sarsfields	Bandon Sportsfield

7 July 1940 First round	Bantry	0-05 - 1-07	Dromtarriffe	Castle Grounds

- Millstreet received a bye in this round.

=== Quarter-finals ===
7 July 1940 Quarter-final	Clonakilty	1-04 - 2-07	Beara	Clonakilty Sportsfield

7 July 1940 Quarter-final	Dromtarriffe	1-07 - 0-05	Bantry	Castle Grounds

14 July 1940 Quarter-final	Duhallow	1-06 - 1-04	St. Nicholas'	Coachford Sportsfield

14 July 1940 Quarter-final	Millstreet	3-06 - 1-04	Midleton	Coachford Sportsfield

=== Semi-finals ===
11 August 1940 Semi-final	Millstreet	2-06 - 0-06	Duhallow	Millstreet Sportsfield

1 September 1940 Semi-final	Beara	3-02 - 2-02	Dromtarriffe	Dunmanway Sportsfield

=== Final ===
15 September 1940 Final	Beara	2-08 - 1-07	Millstreet	Skibbereen Town Park

== Championship statistics ==
=== Miscellaneous ===
- Beara win their first title since 1934.
- Millstreet qualify for the final for the first time.
- Avondhu objected to Collins fielding a team, however, this objection was rejected. In spite of this, Collins withdrew from the championship.
