= John A. Lynch =

John A. Lynch may refer to:

- John A. Lynch Sr. (1908–1978), member of New Jersey Senate and mayor of New Brunswick, New Jersey (1951–1955)
- John A. Lynch Jr. (born 1938), member of New Jersey Senate and mayor of New Brunswick, New Jersey (1979–1991)
- John A. Lynch (New York politician), American businessman and politician from New York
- John A. Lynch (ferryboat)

== See also ==
- John Lynch (disambiguation)
