= Noel Twomey =

Irish Gaelic footballer

Personal information
- Native name: Nollaig Ó Tuama (Irish)
- Nickname: Scobie
- Born: 1969 (age 56–57) Macroom, County Cork, Ireland
- Occupation: Hardware shop owner

Sport
- Sport: Gaelic Football
- Position: Left corner-forward
Clubs
Years	Club	Apps (scores)
1988-2009 1989-1990; 1994-2005	Macroom → Muskerry	4 (0-18); 28 (7-53)
Club titles
- Cork titles: 0
Inter-county
Years	County	Apps (scores)
1989-1995	Cork	0 (0-00)
Inter-county titles
- Munster titles: 0
- All-Irelands: 0
- NFL: 0
- All Stars: 0

Noel Twomey (born 1969) is an Irish former Gaelic footballer. At club level he played with Macroom, divisional side Muskerry and was also a member of the Cork senior football team.

== Playing career ==
Twomey first played Gaelic football as a student at the De La Salle College in Macroom, while also lining out at underage levels with the Macroom club. After winning a Cork MFC title in 1986, he progressed to adult level. Twomey was the team's top scorer when Macroom won the Cork IFC title in 1990. He also earned inclusion on the Muskerry divisional team.

Twomey first played for Cork as a member of the minor team that lost back-to back All-Ireland minor finals in 1986 and 1987 when he was also team captain. He immediately progressed onto the under-21 team and was at right corner-forward when Cork beat Galway in the 1989 All-Ireland under-21 final. It was the first of two All-Ireland medals that year as he was also a member of the junior team that beat Warwickshire to win the All-Ireland JFC title. His performances in these grades resulted in Twomey being drafted onto the training panel of the Cork senior football team. During his six-year tenure he lined out in a number of National League games, however, he failed to make it onto the championship panel. Twomey was a member of the Cork team that won the All-Ireland SFC title in 1990, however, as a member of the extended panel he failed to receive a winners' medal.

== Coaching career ==
In retirement from playing, Twomey became involved in team management and coaching. He managed Macroom to the Cork IFC title in 2010.

== Honours ==
=== Player ===
Macroom

- Cork Intermediate Football Championship: 1990
- Cork Minor Football Championship: 1986

Cork

- All-Ireland Senior Football Championship: 1990
- Munster Senior Football Championship: 1990
- All-Ireland Junior Football Championship:all Ireland and Munster championship winner 1996 1989
- Munster Junior Football Championship: 1996 1989
- All-Ireland Under-21 Football Championship: 1989
- Munster Under-21 Football Championship: 1989
- Munster Minor Football Championship: 1986, 1987 (c)

=== Manager ===
Macroom

- Cork Intermediate Football Championship: 2010

Sporting positions
Preceded by Fintan Corrigan	Cork minor football team captain 1987	Succeeded by Jason Lynch
