= 1949 Cork Senior Football Championship =

Gaelic football competition

- Dates: 3 April - 6 November 1949
- Teams: 21
- Champions: Collins (2nd title); Paddy Cronin (captain)
- Runners-up: Macroom; Ned Casey (captain)

Tournament statistics
- Matches played: 20
- Goals scored: 71 (3.55 per match)
- Points scored: 194 (9.7 per match)

The 1949 Cork Senior Football Championship was the 61st staging of the Cork Senior Football Championship since its establishment by the Cork County Board in 1887. The draw for the first round fixtures took place on 30 January 1949. The championship ran from 3 April to 6 November 1949.

Millstreet were the defending champions, however, they were beaten by Garda in the second round.

The final, a replay, was played on 6 November 1949 at the Athletic Grounds in Cork, between Collins and Macroom, in what was their first meeting in the final in 20 years. Collins won the match by 5-11 to 0-01 to claim their second championship title overall.

== Results ==
=== First round ===
3 April 1949 First round	Macroom	2-15 - 0-01	Avondhu	Kanturk Grounds

10 April 1949 First round	Duhallow	5-06 - 3-05	Bantry Blues	Inchigeelagh Grounds

24 April 1949 First round	Carbery	0-02 - 4-08	Fermoy	Cork Athletic Grounds

24 April 1949 First round	Clonakilty	4-05 - 1-04	Imokilly	Cork Athletic Grounds

24 April 1949 First round	Muskerry	0-04 - 4-08	St Vincent's	Macroom Grounds

8 May 1949 First round	Beara	1-01 - 3-06	Castlemagner	Inchigeelagh Grounds

8 May 1949 First round	Dromtarriffe	1-00 - 7-06	Collins	Mallow Grounds

8 May 1949 First round	University College Cork	4-04 - 1-06 (void)	Garda	Cork Athletic Grounds

15 May 1949 First round	St Nicholas'	2-03 - 1-02	St Patrick's	Cork Athletic Grounds

15 May 1949 First round	Millstreet	2-02 - 1-05	Commercials	Macroom

3 July 1949 First round replay	Millstreet	0-08 - 0-04	Commercials	Macroom Grounds

- St Finbarr's received a bye in this round.

=== Second round ===
24 May 1949 Second round	St Finbarr's	1-02 - 1-03	Clonakilty	Bandon Grounds

12 June 1949 Second round	Macroom	3-07 - 0-03	Duhallow	Millstreet Grounds

7 August 1949 Second round	Castlemagner	0-06 - 2-02 (void)	St Vincent's	Mallow Grounds

7 August 1949 Second round	Garda	2-06 - 1-01	Millstreet	Coachford Grounds

4 September 1949 Second round	Collins	1-09 - 0-05	Fermoy	Midleton Grounds

- St Nicholas' received a bye in this round.

=== Third round ===
4 September 1949 Third round	St Nicholas'	3-04 - 2-02	Clonakilty	Kinsale Grounds

25 September 1949 Third round	Macroom	4-05 - 2-05	Castlemagner	Millstreet Grounds

- Collins and Garda received a bye in this round.

=== Semi-finals ===
18 September 1949 Semi-final	Collins	2-04 - 1-04	Garda	Cork Athletic Grounds

2 October 1949 Semi-final	Macroom	0-08 - 1-04	St Nicholas'	Clonakilty Grounds

=== Final ===
16 October 1949 Final	Collins	0-09 - 1-06	Macroom	Cork Athletic Grounds

=== Final replay ===
6 November 1949 Final replay	Collins	5-11 - 0-01	Macroom	Cork Athletic Grounds
				Referee: T Nagle (Commercials)

== Championship statistics ==
=== Miscellaneous ===
- An objection by Garda against the composition of the University College Cork team which defeated them was upheld and the match awarded to Garda.
- An objection by Castlemagner to St Vincent's on the grounds that one of the players on the St Vincent's team which defeated Castlemagner was not registered. The objection was upheld and Castlemagner were awarded the match.
