= 1962 Cork Senior Football Championship =

Gaelic football competition

- Dates: 1 April - 21 October 1962
- Teams: 24
- Champions: Macroom (10th title); Hugo Casey (captain)
- Runners-up: Muskerry; Ted O'Mahony (captain)

Tournament statistics
- Matches played: 24
- Goals scored: 69 (2.88 per match)
- Points scored: 314 (13.08 per match)
- Top scorer(s): Mickey Barrett (0-18)

The 1962 Cork Senior Football Championship was the 74th staging of the Cork Senior Football Championship since its establishment by the Cork County Board in 1887. The draw for the opening round fixtures took place on 28 January 1962. The championship began on 1 April and ended on 21 October 1962.

Avondhu entered the championship as the defending champions, however, they were beaten by Urhan in the first round.

On 21 October 1962, Macroom won the championship following a 3–04 to 1–04 defeat of Muskerry in the final. This was their 10th championship title overall and their first title since 1958. It remains their last championship title. Mitchelstown's Mickey Barrett was the championship's top scorer with 0–18.

== Team changes ==
=== To Championship ===
Promoted from the Cork Junior Football Championship

- Mitchelstown

=== From Championship ===
Regraded to the Cork Junior Football Championship

- Glanmire

== Results ==
=== First round ===
1 April 1962 First round	Carbery	2-07 - 2-03	Lees	Bandon Grounds
	J Carroll 1-1, M Maguire 1-0, M Hussey 0-2, L Deasy 0-2, J Bambury 0-1, S Davis 0-1.		J O'Sullivan 1-1, E O'Connor 1-0, E Moran 0-2.

1 April 1962 First round	Urhan	1-06 - 1-03	Avondhu	Ballingeary Grounds
	S O'Sullivan 0-4, J O'Neill 1-0, C O'Sullivan 0-2.		P McAuliffe 1-0, J Crowley 0-1, J Lawton 0-1, J Hanrahan 0-1.

8 April 1962 First round	Mitchelstown	2-11 - 1-05	Duhallow	O'Connell Park
	M Barrett 0-7, D Coughlan 1-0, L Power 1-0, D Kelly 0-1, M Curley 0-1, T Monaghan 0-1, M Burke 0-1.		J Cronin 1-0, J Mahony 0-2, M Byrne 0-2, P Moriarty 0-1.

8 April 1962 First round	Muskerry	2-05 - 1-05	St. Finbarr's	Ballincollig Grounds
	S McCarthy 1-2, D Sweeney 1-1, D Murphy 0-1, K O'Sullivan 0-1.		T Cronin 1-1, M Archer 0-1, J Travers 0-1, D Philpott 0-1, D Murphy 0-1.

15 April 1962 First round	Clonakilty	3-03 - 0-03	Beara	Wolfe Tone Park
	D O'Mahony 1-1, J Lyons 1-1, J Sheehy 1-0, C Lane 0-1.		J Lowney 0-1, JL O'Sullivan 0-1, D Harrington 0-1.

13 May 1962 First round	St. Nicholas'	2-08 - 0-04	Garda	Cork Athletic Grounds
	E Buckley 1-2, P Harte 0-5, J O'Sullivan 1-0, D O'Driscoll 0-1.		D McHugh 0-2, J McCarthy 0-1, D Twohig 0-1.

20 May 1962 First round	Mallow	1-03 - 3-13	Nemo Rangers	Coachford Sportsfield
	N O'Regan 1-1, J O'Sullivan 0-1, B Nagle 0-1.		J McCarthy 2-0, B Barrett 0-4, D Barrett 0-4, J O'Mahony 1-0, D Kelly 0-2, J Allen 0-2, V Barrett 0-1.

27 May 1962 First round	Imokilly	1-08 - 2-09	St. Michael's	Riverstown Sportsfield
	D O'Shea 1-1, E Ryan 0-3, N Long 0-1, P Barry 0-1, B Fuller 0-1, P Fitzgerald 0-1.		P O'Sullivan 1-1, J Brohan 0-4, R Ryan 1-0, L Cahill 0-2, J Bennett 0-1, J Hayes 0-1.

=== Second round ===
1 April 1962 Second round	University College Cork	0-13 - 1-03	Carrigdhoun	Manning Park
	D Geaney 0-5, M Kelly 0-4, C O'Sullivan 0-1, J Murphy 0-1, PJ Horgan 0-1, D McCarthy 0-1.		C Casey 1-0, R Sisk 0-1, D O'Brien 0-1, N White 0-1.

22 April 1962 Second round	Seandún	0-01 - 2-10	Macroom	Coachford Sportsfield
	T Walsh 0-1.		O Lynch 1-2, P O'Sullivan 1-0, J O'Donoghue 0-2, N Fitzgerald 0-2, J O'Brien 0-2, T O'Leary 0-1, E Ryan 0-1.

13 May 1962 Second round	Millstreet	3-05 - 1-08	St. Vincent's	Castle Grounds
	B Burke 1-0, Con Kelleher 1-0, W O'Leary 1-0, T Burke 0-2, F Burke 0-1, P Goulding 0-1, D Cribbin 0-1.		P Barry 0-5, J Barry 1-0, C O'Shea 0-3.

20 May 1962 Second round	Delaney Rovers	1-07 - 2-04	Fermoy	Clonmult Memorial Grounds
	C Moynihan 0-4, P Barry 1-0, P Lingane 0-2, Dineen 0-1.		A Scannell 1-1, L Cronin 1-0, McMahon 0-2, R Ennis 0-1.

20 May 1962 Second round	Muskerry	2-06 - 1-04	Urhan	Sam Maguire Park
	K Sullivan 1-0, D Sweeney 1-0, P Galvin 0-3, D Murphy 0-1, K Murphy 0-1, Daithí Sweeney 0-1.		Con Murphy 1-2, J Murphy 0-2.

10 June 1962 Second round replay	Delaney Rovers	2-06 - 3-04	Fermoy	Riverstown Sportsfield
	C Moynihan 0-4, B Moynihan 1-0, P Lingane 1-0, D Murray 0-1, P Dineen 0-1.		A Scannell 1-0, K Dennigan 1-0, R Ennis 0-2, T Ward 0-1, M Nelligan 0-1.

29 July 1962 Second round	Mitchelstown	2-13 - 2-06	St. Michael's	Páirc Mac Gearailt
	M Barrett 0-9, N Curley 1-2, T Monaghan 1-1, T McCarthy 0-1.		J Hayes 1-1, F Mahony 1-0, J Brohan 0-2, M Cashman 0-2, J O'Halloran 0-1.

29 July 1962 Second round	Clonakilty	2-06 - 0-08	Nemo Rangers	Kinsale Grounds
	G McCarthy 1-3, C Lane 1-1, P O'Sullivan 0-1, T O'Leary 0-1.		B Barrett 0-3, V Barrett 0-2, J O'Mahony 0-1, F Lee 0-1, D McDonnell 0-1.

29 July 1962 Second round	St. Nicholas'	1-08 - 1-07	Carbery	Bandon Grounds
	P Harte 0-6, E Buckley 1-1, J O'Sullivan 0-1.		L Deasy 0-4, M Carroll 1-0, R O'Neill 0-1, E Young 0-1, P Laverty 0-1.

=== Quarter-finals ===
24 June 1962 Quarter-final	Macroom	1-13 - 0-05	Millstreet	Coachford Sportsfield
	O Lynch 0-6, C O'Callaghan 1-1, E Ryan 0-2, J O'Brien 0-2, T O'Leary 0-1, H Casey 0-1.		W O'Leary 0-2, T Burke 0-2, J Byrne 0-1.

2 July 1962 Quarter-final	University College Cork	0-17 - 2-05	Fermoy	Riverstown Sportsfield
	M Kelly 0-5, R Honohan 0-3, J Murphy 0-2, D Geaney 0-2, S Heslin 0-2, J Blake 0-2, PJ Horgan 0-1.		R Ennis 1-2, L O'Mahony 1-1, M O'Connor 0-2, K Dennigan 0-1.

19 August 1962 Quarter-final	Muskerry	4-10 - 4-04	Mitchelstown	O'Connell Park
	D Sweeney 2-2, P Galvin 1-3, Donal Murphy 1-1, S McCarthy 0-3, T Mahony 0-1.		R Monaghan 2-1, W Hegarty 1-0, T McCarthy 1-0, M Barrett 0-2, E Coughlan 0-1.

16 September 1962 Quarter-final	St. Nicholas'	1-06 - 1-04	Clonakilty	Bandon Sportsfield
	J O'Sullivan 1-0, D O'Driscoll 0-2, J Salmon 0-1, D Moore 0-1, P Harte 0-1, E Buckley 0-1.		D O'Mahony 1-0, T O'Leary 0-2, P O'Sullivan 0-1, T Hayes 0-1.

=== Semi-finals ===
2 September 1962 Semi-final	Macroom	1-09 - 0-08	University College Cork	Coachford Sportsfield
	N Fitzgerald 1-1, H Casey 0-2, E Ryan 0-2, O Lynch 0-1, P O'Sullivan 0-1, J O'Brien 0-1, F Herins 0-1.		D Geaney 0-5, M Kelly 0-1, D McCarthy 0-1, S Condon 0-1.

7 October 1962 Semi-final	Muskerry	1-04 - 0-06	St. Nicholas'	Cork Athletic Grounds
	S McCarthy 0-4, K O'Sullivan 1-0.		E Buckley 0-1, D O'Driscoll 0-1, E Goulding 0-1, P Harte 0-1, JJ Kelly 0-1, D Moore 0-1.	Referee: D Gowen (Fermoy)

=== Final ===
21 October 1962 Final	Macroom	3-04 - 1-04	Muskerry	Cork Athletic Grounds
	J Murphy 1-0, N Fitzgerald 1-0, R Graham 1-0, E Lynch 0-2, E Ryan 0-1, P Sullivan 0-1.		S McCarthy 0-4, P Galvin 1-0.	Attendance: 13,420; Referee: D Gowen (Fermoy)

== Championship statistics ==
=== Top scorers ===
Overall

Rank	Player	Club	Tally	Total	Matches	Average
1	Mickey Barrett	Mitchelstown	0-18	18	3	6.00
2	Séamus McCarthy	Muskerry	1-13	16	4	4.00
3	Owen Lynch	Macroom	1-11	14	4	3.50
4	Patsy Harte	St. Nicholas'	0-13	13	4	3.25
5	Tom Monaghan	Mitchelstown	3-03	12	3	4.00
5	Pat Galvin	Muskerry	2-06	12	5	2.40
5	David Geaney	UCC	0-12	12	3	4.00

In a single game

Rank	Player	Club	Tally	Total	Opposition
1	Mickey Barrett	Mitchelstown	0-09	9	St. Michael's
2	Daithí Sweeney	Muskerry	2-02	8	Mitchelstown
3	Tom Monaghan	Mitchelstown	2-01	7	Muskerry
3	Mickey Barrett	Mitchelstown	0-07	7	Duhallow
5	J. McCarthy	Nemo Rangers	2-00	6	Mallow
5	Gene McCarthy	Clonakilty	1-03	6	Nemo Rangers
5	Pat Galvin	Muskerry	1-03	6	Mitchelstown
5	Patsy Harte	St. Nicholas'	0-06	6	Carbery
5	Owen Lynch	Macroom	0-06	6	Millstreet
