= Eugene McCarthy (disambiguation) =

Eugene McCarthy or Gene McCarthy may refer to:

- Eugene McCarthy (1916–2005), American politician and poet, also known as Gene
- Eugene McCarthy, chair of the London Green Party
- Gene McCarthy (Gaelic footballer) (born 1938), Irish retired Gaelic footballer

== See also ==
- Joe McCarthy, a politician
