= 1947 Cork Junior Football Championship =

Irish hurling competition

- Champions: Castlemagner (1st title)
- Runners-up: Collins

The 1947 Cork Junior Football Championship was the 49th staging of the Cork Junior Football Championship since its establishment by the Cork County Board in 1895.

The final was played on 22 February 1948 at the Athletic Grounds in Ballyclough, between Castlemagner and Collins, in what was their first ever meeting in the final. Castlemagner won the match by 0–06 to 0–03 to claim their first ever championship title.

== Results ==
=== Final ===
22 February 1948 Final	Castlemagner	0–06 – 0–03	Collins	Ballyclough Athletic Grounds
