= Hugo Casey =

Irish Gaelic footballer

Personal information
- Native name: Aodh Ó Cathasaigh (Irish)
- Nickname: Hugo
- Born: Hugh Casey; 1940 Macroom, County Cork, Ireland
- Died: 17 June 2017 (aged 77) College Road, Cork, Ireland
- Occupation: Wholesaler employee

Sport
- Sport: Gaelic football
- Position: Right corner-forward
Club
- Years: Club
- 1958-1970: Macroom
Club titles
- Cork titles: 2
Inter-county
Years	County	Apps (scores)
1959-1960	Cork	3 (0-01)
Inter-county titles
- Munster titles: 0
- All-Irelands: 0
- NFL: 0
- All Stars: 0

Hugo Casey (1940 – 17 June 2017) was an Irish Gaelic footballer who played for the Cork Championship club Macroom and at inter-county level with the Cork senior football team. He usually lined out at corner-forward

== Career ==
Casey joined the Macroom senior team in 1958 and ended the season with a Cork SFC title after a defeat of Avondhu in the final. Macroom was beaten by St. Finbarr's in the 1959 final, with Casey later suffering injury and dropping down to the Macroom junior team the following year. In 1962, with Casey as captain, Macroom won a second Cork SFC title in four seasons after a defeat Muskerry. He first appeared on the inter-county scene during an unsuccessful two-year tenure with the Cork GAA minor football team. After an impressive performance for the Cork junior football team in 1959, Casey was immediately drafted onto the senior team that was beaten by Kerry in the Munster final. He was also on the Cork team which suffered a shock defeat to Waterford in the 1960 semi-final before leaving the team. Casey returned to the inter-county scene in 1964 as corner-forward on the Cork junior team that beat London in the All-Ireland final.

== Personal life and death ==
Casey was born and raised in Macroom, County Cork, before later living in Shanakiel in Cork. He worked at J. W. Green & Co for many years. He died at the Bon Secours Hospital on 17 June 2017, aged 77.

== Honours ==
Macroom

- Cork Senior Football Championship: 1958, 1962 (c)

Cork

- All-Ireland Junior Football Championship: 1964
- Munster Junior Football Championship: 1964
