= 1933 Cork Senior Football Championship =

Gaelic football competition

- Dates: 2 April – 15 October 1933
- Teams: 12
- Champions: Beara (2nd title); D. O'Sullivan (captain)
- Runners-up: Clonakilty; Dan O'Donovan (captain)

Tournament statistics
- Matches played: 12
- Goals scored: 43 (3.58 per match)
- Points scored: 89 (7.42 per match)

The 1933 Cork Senior Football Championship was the 45th staging of the Cork Senior Football Championship since its establishment by the Cork County Board in 1887. The draw for the first round fixtures took place on 29 January 1933. The championship ran from 2 April to 15 October 1933.

Beara were the defending champions.

The final was played on 15 October 1933 at Clonakilty Sportsfield, between Beara and Clonakilty, in what was their second consecutive meeting in the final. Beara won the match by 2–05 to 0–04 to claim their second consecutive championship title.

== Results ==
=== First round ===
| 2 April 1933 First round | Duhallow West | 0-03 - 4-04 | Clonakilty | The Mardyke |

| 9 April 1933 First round | Collins | 2-07 - 0-01 | Nils | Cork Athletic Grounds |

| 9 April 1933 First round | Muskerry | 0-00 - 4-04 | Beara | Bantry Grounds |

| 16 April 1933 First round | Seandún | 3-02 - 5-06 | Avondhu | St Patrick's Grounds |

| 23 April 1933 First round | Carbery | 4-05 - 2-06 | Imokilly | Cork Athletic Grounds |

| 7 May 1933 First round | University College Cork | 1-01 - 0-03 | Macroom | Crookstown Grounds |

=== Second round ===
| 25 June 1933 Second round | Avondhu | 3-06 - 1-02 | University College Cork | Mitchelstown Athletic Grounds |

| 27 August 1933 Second round | Beara | 0-05 - 0-02 | Carbery | Castle Grounds |

- Collins and Clonakilty received a bye in this round.

=== Semi-finals ===
| 11 June 1933 Semi-final | Clonakilty | 2-04 - 2-02 | Collins | The Mardyke |

| 10 September 1933 Semi-final | Beara | 3-04 - 3-04 | Avondhu | Bandon Grounds |

| 1 October 1933 Semi-final replay | Beara | 2-08 - 0-01 | Avondhu | Bandon Grounds |

=== Final ===
| 15 October 1933 Final | Beara | 2-05 - 0-04 | Clonakilty | Clonakilty Sportsfield |
