= Maurice Murphy =

Maurice Murphy may refer to:

- Maurice Murphy (musician) (1935–2010), British musician, principal trumpet of the London Symphony Orchestra
- Maurice J. Murphy Jr. (1927–2002), New Hampshire Attorney General and United States Senator
- Maurice Murphy (director) (born 1939), Australian film and television director, producer, writer and actor
- Maurice Murphy (hurler), Irish hurler
- Maurice Murphy (actor) (1913–1978), American actor
