= John Lynch =

John Lynch may refer to:

== Academics and clergy ==
- John Lynch (dean of Canterbury) (1697–1760), Anglican priest
- John Lynch (historian) (1927–2018), historian of the Spanish American revolutions
- John Lynch (linguist) (1946–2021), professor at the University of the South Pacific in Port Vila, Vanuatu
- John Lynch (Gratianus Lucius) (1599?–1677), historian and Archdeacon of Tuam
- John Joseph Lynch (1816–1888), Catholic bishop and archbishop of Toronto
- John Lynch (archdeacon of Canterbury) (1735–1803), Archdeacon of Canterbury
- John Lynch (bishop of Elphin) (active 1561–1611), Irish Anglican bishop
- John Douglas Lynch (born 1942), American herpetologist.

== Entertainment ==
- John Lynch (actor) (born 1961), actor from Northern Ireland
- Johnny Lynch (born 1981), Scottish musician
- John Carroll Lynch (born 1963), American actor

== Politics ==
=== American politicians ===
- John Lynch (Maine politician) (1825–1892), U.S. congressman from Maine
- John Lynch (New Hampshire governor) (born 1952), former governor of U.S. state of New Hampshire, 2005–2013
- John Lynch (Pennsylvania politician) (1843–1910), U.S. congressman from Pennsylvania
- John A. Lynch Jr. (born 1938), New Jersey politician, convicted of fraud
- John A. Lynch Sr. (1908–1978), New Jersey politician
- John A. Lynch (New York politician) (1882–1954), American businessman and politician from New York
- John C. Lynch (1851–1941), speaker of the California State Assembly
- John D. Lynch (1883–1963), mayor of Cambridge, Massachusetts
- John R. Lynch (1847–1939), African-American Republican Mississippi politician after the American Civil War
- John M. Lynch (died 1984), American mayor of Somerville, Massachusetts

=== Other politicians ===
- John Lynch (Australian politician) (1862–1941), member of the Australian House of Representatives, 1914–1919
- John Lynch (New South Wales politician) (1875–1944), member of the New South Wales Legislative Assembly, 1907–1913
- John Lynch (Kerry politician) (1889–1957), Irish Fine Gael party TD for Kerry North, later Senator
- John Lynch (mayor), mayor of Galway, 1489–90
- John Óge Lynch, mayor of Galway, 1551–52

== Sports ==
- John Lynch (American football) (born 1971), American football executive and former player
- John Lynch (Tyrone Gaelic footballer) (born 1962), former Tyrone Gaelic footballer
- John Lynch (Roscommon Gaelic footballer) (1933–2019), Irish Gaelic footballer
- John Lynch (Cork Gaelic footballer) (1890–1930), Irish Gaelic footballer

== Others ==
- John Lynch (Fenian) (1832–1866), Irish nationalist
- John Lynch (radio), founder and president of Broadcast Company of the Americas
- John Lynch (serial killer) (1813–1842), Australian colonial-era serial killer
- John Lynch (1740–1820), founder of the city of Lynchburg, Virginia

== See also ==
- John A. Lynch (ferryboat), a ferryboat built in 1925
- Jack Lynch (disambiguation)
