= Dick Harnedy =

Irish Gaelic footballer

Personal information
- Native name: Risteard Ó hAirtnéada (Irish)
- Born: 28 November 1910 Kilcorney, County Cork, Ireland
- Died: 25 May 1983 (aged 72) Cork, Ireland
- Occupation: Sugar factory employee

Sport
- Sport: Gaelic football
- Position: Midfield
Clubs
- Years: Club
- Dromtarriffe; Castlemagner → Duhallow
Club titles
- Cork titles: 1
Inter-county
| Years | County | Apps (scores) |
| 1933–1944 | Cork | 15 (2-05) |
Inter-county titles
- Munster titles: 1
- All-Irelands: 0
- NFL: 0

Richard Harnedy (28 November 1910 – 25 May 1983) was an Irish Gaelic footballer. At club level he played with Dromtarriffe and Castlemagner, divisional side Duhallow and at inter-county level with Cork.

== Career ==
Harnedy first played Gaelic football during a successful era for the Dromtarriffe club. His honours with the club included five Duhallow JFC titles, two Cork JFC titles and a Cork IFC in 1935. Harnedy spent the last decade of his club career with the Castlemagner club and won a further three Duhallow JFC titles. His performances at club level also earned his selection for the Duhallow divisional team. Harnedy captained the division to the Cork SFC title in 1936.

Harnedy's inter-county career with Cork began as a member of both the junior and senior teams in 1933. He won a Munster JFC medal that year before becoming one of the mainstays of the senior team over the course of the following decade. Harnedy won a Munster SFC medal in 1943, in what was Cork's first provincial title in 15 years. His performances also saw him included on the Munster inter-provincial team and he won a Railway Cup medal in 1941.

== Personal life and death ==
Harnedy joined Irish Sugar in Mallow as a temporary worker in 1934. He later became a foreman and held the position of process supervisor on his retirement in 1976. Harnedy married Catherine Collins in 1942 and the couple had four children, one of whom, Dan Harnedy, played with Cork in the 1960s.

Harnedy died at the Mercy Hospital in Cork on 25 May 1983, at the age of 72. He was posthumously named on the Cork Football Team of the Century a year later.

== Honours ==
Dromtarriffe

- Cork Intermediate Football Championship: 1935
- Cork Junior Football Championship: 1934, 1938
- Duhallow Junior A Football Championship: 1933, 1934, 1938, 1943, 1945

Castlemagner

- Duhallow Junior A Football Championship: 1947, 1948, 1952

Duhallow

- Cork Senior Football Championship: 1936 (c)

Cork

- Munster Senior Football Championship: 1943
- Munster Junior Football Championship: 1933

Munster

- Railway Cup: 1941
