= 1948 Cork Junior Football Championship =

Irish hurling competition

- Champions: Collins (2nd title)
- Runners-up: Canovee

The 1948 Cork Junior Football Championship was the 50th staging of the Cork Junior Football Championship since its establishment by the Cork County Board in 1895.

The final was played on 28 November 1948 at Coachford Sportsfield, between Collins and Canovee, in what was their first ever meeting in the final. Collins won the match by 5–11 to 3–00 to claim their second championship title overall and a first championship title in three years.

== Results ==
=== Final ===
28 November 1948 Final	Collins	5–11 – 3–00	Canovee	Coachford Sportsfield
