= 1931 Cork Senior Football Championship =

Gaelic football competition

- Dates: 29 March – 4 October 1931
- Teams: 15
- Champions: Macroom (7th title); D. O'Brien (captain)
- Runners-up: Carbery; M. Gallagher (captain)

Tournament statistics
- Matches played: 12
- Goals scored: 47 (3.92 per match)
- Points scored: 75 (6.25 per match)

The 1931 Cork Senior Football Championship was the 43rd staging of the Cork Senior Football Championship since its establishment by the Cork County Board in 1887. The draw for the first round fixtures took place on 25 January 1931. The championship ran from 29 March to 4 October 1931.

Macroom were the defending champions.

The final was played on 4 October 1931 at the Mardyke in Cork, between Macroom and Carbery, in what was their first ever meeting in the final. Macroom won the match by 2–06 to 2–02 to claim their seventh championship title overall and a second consecutive title.

== Results ==
=== First round ===
| 29 March 1931 First round | Geraldines | 0-00 - 2-06 | Collins | The Mardyke |

| 29 March 1931 First round | Macroom | 2-05 - 0-00 | Nils | Killumney Grounds |

| 29 March 1931 First round | Carbery | 6-01 - 2-00 | University College Cork | Bandon Grounds |

| 19 April 1931 First round | Fermoy | 2-01 - 0-03 | Youghal | Midleton Grounds |

| 3 May 1931 First round | Beara | 3-07 - 0-01 | Nemo Rangers | Bantry Grounds |

| 3 May 1931 First round | St Finbarr's | 1-00 - 8-06 | Na Deasúnaigh | The Mardyke |

| First round | Lee–St Michael's | w/o - scr. | Mitchelstown |

- Duhallow received a bye in this round.

=== Second round ===
| 21 June 1931 Second round | Collins | 0-03 - 5-06 | Macroom | Ballincollig Grounds |

| 12 July 1931 Second round | Duhallow United | 0-02 - 3-02 | Beara | Castle Grounds |

| 3 July 1931 Second round | Na Deasúnaigh | w/o - scr. | Lee–St Michael's | The Mardyke |

| 19 July 1931 Second round | Carbery | 6-03 - 0-01 | Fermoy | Cork Athletic Grounds |

=== Semi-finals ===
| 2 August 1931 Semi-final | Macroom | 0-06 - 0-02 | Beara | Bantry Grounds |

| 13 September 1931 Semi-final | Carbery | 1-08 - 2-04 | Na Deasúnaigh | Enniskeane Grounds |

=== Final ===
| 4 October 1931 Final | Macroom | 2-06 - 2-02 | Carbery | The Mardyke |
