= Mick Goold =

Irish Gaelic footballer

Personal information
- Native name: Mícheál de Gúl (Irish)
- Born: 1930 Kilnamartyra, County Cork, Ireland
- Died: 25 November 2005 (aged 75) College Road, Cork, Ireland
- Occupation: Veterinary surgeon
- Height: 6 ft 1 in (185 cm)

Sport
- Sport: Gaelic Football
- Position: Right corner-back
Club
- Years: Club
- Macroom
Club titles
- Cork titles: 2
College(s)
- Years: College
- 1948-1950 1950-1954: University College Cork; University College Dublin
College titles
- Sigerson titles: 1
Inter-county*
Years	County	Apps (scores)
1950-1959	Cork	19 (0-00)
Inter-county titles
- Munster titles: 3
- All-Irelands: 0
- NFL: 2
- *Inter County team apps and scores correct as of 01:28, 12 April 2012.

Michael Goold (1930 – 25 November 2005) was an Irish Gaelic footballer. At club level he played with Macroom and was also a member of the Cork senior football team.

== Playing career ==
Goold first played Gaelic football with the Macroom minor team that won the Cork MFC title in 1948. He also won a Harty Cup medal that year as a boarder at St. Colman's College in Fermoy. He later lined out with University College Cork before winning a Sigerson Cup title with University College Dublin in 1954. Goold later lined out at senior level with Macroom and captained the team to the Cork SFC in 1958 before winning a second title in 1962.

Goold first played for Cork as a member of the minor team in 1948. He joined the junior team in 1950 before immediately being drafted onto the senior team. Goold won a National League title in 1952 before winning a Munster SFC title as a substitute later that season. He enjoyed further inter-county success throughout the 1956-57 seasons, winning a second National League title and consecutive Munster SFC medals. The ultimate success eluded Goold as Cork suffered back-to-back All-Ireland final defeats by Galway in 1956 and Louth in 1957. His performances for Cork also earned inclusion on the Munster team in the Railway Cup.

== Death ==
Goold died at the Bon Secours Hospital in Cork on 25 November 2005, aged 75.

== Honours ==
St. Colman's College

- Harty Cup: 1948

University College Dublin

- Sigerson Cup: 1954

Macroom

- Cork Senior Football Championship: 1958 (c), 1962
- Cork Minor Football Championship: 1948

Cork

- Munster Senior Football Championship: 1952, 1956, 1957
- National Football League: 1951-52, 1955-56
