= 1935 Cork Senior Football Championship =

Gaelic football competition

- Dates: 31 March – 6 October 1935
- Teams: 11
- Champions: Macroom (8th title); Con Cronin (captain)
- Runners-up: Clonakilty; Dan O'Donovan (captain)

Tournament statistics
- Matches played: 13
- Goals scored: 24 (1.85 per match)
- Points scored: 88 (6.77 per match)

The 1935 Cork Senior Football Championship was the 47th staging of the Cork Senior Football Championship since its establishment by the Cork County Board in 1887. The draw for the first round fixtures took place on 27 January 1935. The championship ran from 31 March to 6 October 1935.

Beara were the defending champions, however, they were beaten by Kilmurry in the second round.

The final was played on 6 October 1935 at the Athletic Grounds in Cork, between Macroom and Clonakilty, in what was their first ever meeting in the final. Macroom won the match by 1–03 to 1–02 to claim their eighth championship title overall and a first title in four years.

== Team changes ==
=== To Championship ===
Promoted from the Cork Intermediate Football Championship

- Bantry Blues

Decided to field a team

- Seandún

=== From Championship ===
Declined to field a team

- Carbery
- Muskerry
- Nils

== Results ==
=== First round ===
31 March 1935 First round	Imokilly	1-02 - 0-05	Collins	Midleton Grounds

31 March 1935 First round	Beara	1-08 - 0-02	University College Cork	Bantry Grounds

7 April 1935 First round	Clonakilty	1-04 - 1-02	Seandún	Enniskean Grounds

5 May 1935 First round	Duhallow West	0-05 - 1-02	Macroom	Millstreet Grounds

9 June 1935 First round replay	Imokilly	3-00 - 0-02	Collins	Castlemartyr Grounds

9 June 1935 First round	Avondhu	1-06 - 0-03	Bantry Blues	The Mardyke

16 June 1935 First round replay	Duhallow West	0-04 - 0-06	Macroom	Millstreet Grounds

16 June 1935 First round second replay	Imokilly	1-03 - 2-05	Collins	Riverstown Sportsfield

- Kilmurry received a bye in this round.

=== Second round ===
19 May 1935 Second round	Kilmurry	1-02 - 0-02	Beara	Bantry Grounds

7 July 1935 Second round	Collins	0-00 - 1-04	Clonakilty	The Mardyke

- Avondhu and Clonakilty received byes in this round.

=== Semi-finals ===
18 August 1935 Semi-finals	Avondhu	2-02 - 3-07	Macroom	Cork Athletic Grounds

1 September 1935 Semi-final	Kilmurry	1-01 - 2-06	Clonakilty	Bandon Grounds

=== Final ===
6 October 1935 Final	Macroom	1-03 - 1-02	Clonakilty	Cork Athletic Grounds
