= 1913 Cork Intermediate Football Championship =

Gaelic football competition

- Champions: Clonakilty (1st title); John O'Donovan (captain)
- Runners-up: O'Briens

The 1913 Cork Intermediate Football Championship was the fifth staging of the Cork Intermediate Football Championship since its establishment by the Cork County Board in 1909.

The final was played on 31 August 1913 at the Athletic Grounds in Kinsale, between Clonakilty and O'Briens, in what was their first ever meeting in the final. Clonakilty won the match by 2–01 to 1–00 to claim their first ever championship title.

== Results ==
=== Final ===
31 August 1913 Final	Clonakilty	2-01 - 1-00	O'Briens	Kinsale Athletic Grounds
