= 1930 Cork Senior Football Championship =

Gaelic football competition

- Dates: 13 April – 21 September 1930
- Teams: 13
- Champions: Macroom (6th title); D. O'Brien (captain)
- Runners-up: Na Deasúnaigh; M. Donegan (captain)

Tournament statistics
- Matches played: 10
- Goals scored: 40 (4 per match)
- Points scored: 88 (8.8 per match)

The 1930 Cork Senior Football Championship was the 42nd staging of the Cork Senior Football Championship since its establishment by the Cork County Board in 1887. The draw for the first round fixtures took place on 26 January 1930. The championship ran from 13 April to 21 September 1930.

Collins were the defending champions, however, they were beaten by Macroom in the semi-finals.

The final was played on 21 September 1930 at the Mardyke in Cork, between Macroom and Na Deasúnaigh, in what was their first ever meeting in the final. Macroom won the match by 2–08 to 2–03 to claim their sixth championship title overall and a first title in five years.

== Results ==
=== First round ===
13 April 1930 First round	Garda	w/o - scr.	Mitchelstown	Fermoy Grounds

27 April 1930 First round	Na Deasúnaigh	w/o - scr.	Nils	The Mardyke

4 May 1930 First round	Geraldines	0-01 - 5-03	Colliins	Cork Athletic Grounds

11 May 1930 First round	Macroom	1-08 - 0-04	Carbery	Dunmanway Grounds

11 May 1930 First round	Lee–St Michael's	2-03 - 1-07	Fermoy	Riverstown Sportsfield

13 July 1930 First round	Youghal	0-00 - 8-10	Beara	Castle Grounds

- Nemo Rangers received a bye in this round.

=== Second round ===
18 May 1930 Second round	Nemo Rangers	1-02 - 2-11	Na Deasúnaigh	The Mardyke

8 June 1930 Second round	Macroom	3-09 - 0-01	Garda	Killumney Grounds

3 August 1930 Second round	Collins	2-04 - 0-01	Beara	Bantry Grounds

- Fermoy received a bye in this round.

=== Semi-finals ===
15 June 1930 Semi-final	Na Deasúnaigh	4-03 - 2-03	Fermoy	St Patrick's Grounds

24 August 1930 Semi-final	Macroom	3-05 - 2-02	Collins	The Mardyke

=== Final ===
21 September 1930 Final	Macroom	2-08 - 2-03	Na Deasúnaigh	The Mardyke
