= 1934 Cork Senior Football Championship =

Gaelic football competition

- Dates: 25 March – 26 August 1934
- Teams: 12
- Champions: Beara (3rd title); D. O'Sullivan (captain)
- Runners-up: Clonakilty; Dan O'Donovan (captain)

Tournament statistics
- Matches played: 11
- Goals scored: 36 (3.27 per match)
- Points scored: 74 (6.73 per match)

The 1934 Cork Senior Football Championship was the 46th staging of the Cork Senior Football Championship since its establishment by the Cork County Board in 1887. The draw for the first round fixtures took place on 28 January 1934. The championship ran from 25 March to 26 August 1934.

Beara were the defending champions.

The final was played on 26 August 1934 at the Castletownbere Grounds, between Beara and Clonakilty, in what was their third consecutive meeting in the final. Beara won the match by 2–06 to 2–03 to claim their third consecutive championship title.

== Results ==
=== First round ===
| 25 March 1934 First round | Muskerry | 4-03 - 1-01 | Nils | Ballincollig Grounds |

| 8 April 1934 First round | Imokilly | 4-03 - 2-03 | Duhallow West | The Mardyke |

| 8 April 1934 First round | Kilmurry | 0-02 - 1-04 | Beara | Bantry Grounds |

| 15 April 1934 First round | Avondhu | 0-00 - 1-03 | Macroom | The Mardyke |

| 15 April 1934 First round | Collins | 1-07 - 0-02 | Carbery | Clonakilty Sportsfield |

| 22 April 1934 First round | University College Cork | 1-02 - 5-08 | Clonakilty | Kinsale Sportsfield |

=== Second round ===
| 24 June 1934 Second round | Beara | 2-03 - 0-04 | Collins | Bantry Grounds |

| 24 June 1934 Second round | Macroom | 4-10 - 0-00 | Muskerry | Coachford Sportsfield |

| 24 June 1934 Second round | Imokilly | 0-02 - 1-03 | Clonakilty | The Mardyke |

=== Semi-final ===
| 29 July 1934 Semi-final | Beara | 4-02 - 1-05 | Macroom | The Mardyke |

- Clonakilty received a bye in this round.

=== Final ===
| 26 August 1934 Final | Beara | 2-06 - 2-03 | Clonakilty | Castletownbere Grounds |
