= 1990 All-Ireland Junior Football Championship =

Inter-county Gaelic football competition held in 1989

All Ireland Champions
- Winners: Cork (9th win)
- Captain: Joe Collins
- Manager: Seán Ryan

All Ireland Runners-up
- Runners-up: Warwickshire

Provincial Champions
- Munster: Cork
- Leinster: Meath
- Ulster: Not Played
- Connacht: Not Played

The 1990 All-Ireland Junior Hurling Championship was the 60th staging of the All-Ireland Junior Championship, the Gaelic Athletic Association's second tier Gaelic football championship.

Cork entered the championship as the defending champions.

The All-Ireland final was played on 9 September 1990 at Páirc Uí Chaoimh in Cork, between Cork and Warwickshire, in what was their sixth meeting in the final and a second meeting in succession. Cork won the match by 3-16 to 0-08 to claim their ninth championship title overall and a second consecutive title.

== Results ==
=== Leinster Junior Football Championship ===
==== Leinster quarter-finals ====
5 May 1990 Quarter-final	Dublin	1-12 - 1-02	Kilkenny	O'Toole Park

6 May 1990 Quarter-final	Wexford	4-06 - 1-11	Longford	O'Kennedy Park
	J Neville 1-2, P Kavanagh 1-1, J Molloy 1-0, M Furlong 1-0, R Deane 0-2, G Waters 0-1.		J McCormack 1-5, S Smith 0-3, E McCormack 0-2, E Murtagh 0-1.	Referee: T Duggan (Kilkenny)

=== Leinster semi-finals ===
16 May 1990 Semi-final	Dublin	1-12 - 0-07	Wexford	Parnell Park
	S Callery 1-1, J Madden 0-3, P O'Hara 0-3, M Barr 0-2, N Lally 0-1, B Cooke 0-1, S Murray 0-1.		G Neville 0-2, G Waters 0-1, R Deane 0-1, J Meyler 0-1, J McGoverney 0-1, M Furlong 0-1.

22 May 1990 Semi-final	Kildare	1-09 - 1-13	Meath	St. Conleth's Park
			C Carry 1-0, L McCormack 0-3, T Dowd 0-3, L Smith 0-2, J Devine 0-2, P Donnelly 0-1, S Kelly 0-1, P Curran 0-1.

==== Leinster final ====
3 June 1990 Final	Meath	0-15 - 0-11	Dublin	Drogheda Park
	L Smith 0-4, T Dowd 0-4, J Henry 0-3, J Halpin 0-1, L McCormack 0-1.		J Madden 0-3, C O'Hara 0-2, S Callery 0-1, P Hegarty 0-1, N Lally 0-1, M Barnes 0-1, S Barry 0-1, B Cooke 0-1.

=== Munster Junior Football Championship ===
==== Munster quarter-finals ====
6 May 1990 Quarter-final	Tipperary	7-14 - 0-08	Limerick	Clonmel GAA Ground
	F Kelly 3-3, J Dunne 2-2, S McManus 1-3, P Costello 1-0, O Downes 0-2, P Kilkenny 0-2, J Lowery 0-2.		J Collins 0-3, G Ryan 0-2, J Brouder 0-1, P O'Connor 0-1, J Duggan 0-1.

6 May 1990 Quarter-final	Waterford	1-09 - 2-06	Clare	Fraher Field
	P Fitzgerald 1-1, J Hallinan 0-4, N Power 0-1, J Troy 0-1, M Hallihan 0-1, P Ferncombe 0-1.		D Coughlan 1-2, P Morrissey 1-0, J Meaney 0-3, G Fitzpatrick 0-1.

20 May 1990 Quarter-final replay	Waterford	2-10 - 2-08	Clare	Frank Sheehy PArk
	N Whelan 1-3, P Fitzgerald 1-3, J Burns 0-2, P Ferncombe 0-2.		J Meaney 2-1, D Coughlan 0-2, S Cleary 0-2, G Fitzpatrick 0-1, J Fennell 0-1, J Cullen 0-1.

==== Munster semi-finals ====
27 May 1990 Semi-final	Kerry	0-11 - 0-06	Waterford	Frank Sheehy Par
	S Fitzgerald 0-3, D Culloty 0-2, P Keane 0-2, P Dillane 0-2, F Ashe 0-1, S Carrig 0-1.		A Fitzgerald 0-2, J Murray 0-1, N Whelan 0-1, J Troy 0-1, P Ferncombe 0-1.

27 May 1990 Semi-final	Cork	3-12 - 2-04	Tipperary	Páirc Uí Chaoimh
	T O'Reilly 1-4, M Lewis 1-0, C O'Neill 1-0, C O'Sullivan 0-2, J Caulfield 0-2, A Barry 0-2, J Allen 0-1, M Kelleher 0-1.		F Kelly 2-3, J O'Donnell 0-1.	Referee: M O'Sullivan (Kerry)

==== Munster final ====
20 June 1990 Final	Cork	1-09 - 1-06	Kerry	Castle Grounds
	M Lewis 1-0, A Barry 0-3, C O'Neill 0-3, J Caulfield 0-2, M Kelleher 0-1.		S Fitzgerald 0-4, S Burke 1-0, E Breen 0-1, C Geaney 0-1.	Referee: P Lonergan (Tipperary)

=== All-Ireland Junior Football Championship ===
==== All-Ireland home final ====
28 July 1990 Home final	Cork	1-12 - 1-10	Meath	O'Moore Park
	T O'Reilly 1-5, M Lewis 0-3, D Fitzgerald 0-1, G McPolin 0-1, L Honohan 0-1, G Manley 0-1.		L Smith 1-5, J Cunningham 0-3, P Curran 0-1, C Carry 0-1.	Referee: T Maher (Laois)

==== All-Ireland final ====
9 September 1990 Final	Cork	3-16 - 0-08	Warwickshire	Páirc Uí Chaoimh
	J Caulfield 1-3, T O'Reilly 1-2, M Kelleher 1-1, G McPolin 0-4, C O'Sullivan 0-3, M Lewis 0-2, D Lynch 0-1.		S Crowe 0-3, J Mooney 0-2, C Folan 0-1, T Tolan 0-1, N Menamin 0-1.	Referee: T Howard (Kildare)
