= Jack Young (Gaelic footballer) =

Irish Gaelic footballer and hurler

Personal information
- Native name: Seán de Siún (Irish)
- Born: 20 October 1887 Dunmanway, County Cork, Ireland
- Died: 9 February 1965 (aged 77) Cork, Ireland
- Occupation: National school principal

Sport
- Sport: Gaelic Football
- Position: Midfield
Club
- Years: Club
- 1900s-1920s: Nils
Club titles
- Cork titles: 2
Inter-county*
Years	County	Apps (scores)
1911-1912	Cork	4 (0-2)
Inter-county titles
- Munster titles: 1
- All-Irelands: 1
- *Inter County team apps and scores correct as of 22:20, 10 April 2012.

John "Jack" Young (20 October 1887 – 9 February 1965) was an Irish Gaelic footballer who played as a midfielder at senior level for the Cork county team.

Young made his first appearance for the team during the 1911 championship and was a regular member of the starting fifteen for just two championship seasons. During that time he won a set of All-Ireland and Munster winners' medals.

At club level Young began his career with Doheny's before later winning two county championship medals with Nils in Cork city. He also played hurling with the St Finbarr's club.

Young was the patriarch of a famous Gaelic games family in Cork. His sons, Éamonn and Jim, were All-Ireland medalists in football and hurling respectively.
