= Con Kelleher =

Irish Gaelic footballer

Personal information
- Native name: Conchur Ó Céileachair (Irish)
- Born: 1891 Macroom, County Cork, Ireland
- Died: Unknown
- Occupation: Fisherman

Sport
- Sport: Gaelic Football
- Position: Forward
Club
- Years: Club
- 1900s-1920s: Macroom
Club titles
- Cork titles: 4
Inter-county*
Years	County	Apps (scores)
1910-1911	Cork	6
Inter-county titles
- Munster titles: 1
- All-Irelands: 1
- *Inter County team apps and scores correct as of 16:12, 11 April 2012.

Cornelius "Con" Kelleher (born 1891) was an Irish Gaelic footballer who played as a forward for the Cork senior team.

Kelleher made his first appearance for the team during the 1910 championship and was a regular member of the starting fifteen for just two seasons. During that time he won a set of All-Ireland and Munster winners' medals.

At club level Kelleher was a multiple county championship medalist with Macroom.
