= 1958 Cork Senior Football Championship =

Gaelic football competition

- Dates: 6 April – 28 September 1958
- Teams: 22
- Champions: Macroom (9th title); Mick Goold (captain)
- Runners-up: Avondhu

Tournament statistics
- Matches played: 24
- Goals scored: 56 (2.33 per match)
- Points scored: 307 (12.79 per match)

The 1958 Cork Senior Football Championship was the 70th staging of the Cork Senior Football Championship since its establishment by the Cork County Board in 1887. The draw for the first and second round fixtures took place on 26 January 1958. The championship ran from 6 April to 28 September 1958.

St Finbarr's were the defending champions.

The final was played on 28 September 1958 at the Athletic Grounds in Cork, between Macroom and first-time finalists Avondhu. Macroom won the match by 1–07 to 0–09 to claim their ninth championship title overall and a first title in 23 years.

== Results ==
=== First round ===
6 April 1958 First round	Carrigdhoun	0-01 - 4-11	Millstreet	Bandon Grounds

6 April 1958 First round	Macroom	1-09 - 2-03	Nemo Rangers	Coachford Sportsfield

13 April 1958 First round	Carbery	0-01 - 3-04	St Nicholas'	Bandon Grounds

20 April 1958 First round	Muskerry	0-04 - 0-11	St Finbarr's	Coachford Sportsfield

20 April 1958 First round	Bandon	3-06 - 1-11	University College Cork	Innishannon Grounds

27 April 1958 First round	St Michael's	0-05 - 0-10	St Vincents	The Mardyke

=== Second round ===
6 April 1958 Second round	Clonakilty	0-04 - 0-06	Beara	Bantry Grounds

6 April 1958 Second round	Imokilly	3-08 - 3-03	Garda	Midleton Grounds

13 April 1948 Second round	Seandún	0-03 - 1-08	Avondhu	Fitzgerald Park

20 April 1958 Second round	Duhallow	0-06 - 1-02	Collins	Millstreet Grounds

11 May 1958 Second round	Delaney Rovers	0-06 - 1-04	Lees	Cork Athletic Grounds

6 July 1958 Second round	St Finbarr's	0-13 - 0-09	Bandon	Kinsale Grounds

6 July 1958 Second round	St Vincents	1-05 - 1-05	Millstreet	Bishop McEgan Park

27 July 1958 Second round replay	St Vincents	2-05 - 2-04	Millstreet	Bishop McEgan Park

3 August 1958 Second round	Macroom	3-10 - 1-02	St Nicholas'	Coachford Sportsfield

=== Quarter-finals ===
6 July 1958 Quarter-final	Lees	3-09 - 1-09	Duhallow	Newmarket Grounds

6 July 1958 Quarter-final	Imokilly	3-15 - 3-06	Avondhu	Cork Athletic Grounds

17 August 1958 Quarter-final	Beara	1-05 - 1-05	St Vincent's	Clonakilty Grounds

31 August 1958 Quarter-final	Macroom	0-07 - 0-04	St Finbarr's	Cork Athletic Grounds

31 August 1958 Quarter-final replay	Beara	3-05 - 0-06	St Vincent's	Skibbereen Grounds

=== Semi-finals ===
3 August 1958 Semi-final	Avondhu	0-10 - 2-04	Lees	Riverstown Sportsfield

24 August 1958 Semi-final replay	Avondhu	3-08 - 0-03	Lees	Riverstown Sportsfield

14 September 1958 Semi-final	Macroom	1-10 - 1-06	Beara	Bandon Grounds

=== Final ===
28 September 1958 Final	Macroom	1-07 - 0-09	Avondhu	Cork Athletic Grounds
				Attendance: 4,777; Referee: T Crowley (Clonakilty)
