= Tom Creedon =

Irish Gaelic football player

Personal information
- Native name: Tomás Ó Críodáin (Irish)
- Born: Macroom, County Cork
- Died: 27 August 1983
- Height: 6 ft 2 in (188 cm)

Sport
- Sport: Gaelic football
- Position: Right Corner Back / Centre Back
Club
- Years: Club
- 1971–1983: Macroom
Club titles
- Cork titles: 1
College
- Years: College
- UCC
Inter-county
Years	County	Apps (scores)
1972–1983	Cork	15(0–5)
Inter-county titles
- Munster titles: 0
- All-Irelands: 0
- NFL: 1
- All Stars: 0

Tom Creedon (1954 – 28 August 1983) was an Irish sportsperson from Macroom, County Cork. He played Gaelic football with his local club Macroom and was a member of the Cork senior inter-county team from 1975 until 1983. Creedon was predominantly a centre back but also played at right corner back and midfield on the Cork team that played in seven Munster finals. He won a National League medal with Cork in 1980. Creedon also played at inter-provincial level with Munster and was a member of the Munster teams that won the Railway Cup in 1977 and 1981.

== Playing career ==
=== Club ===
Creedon played his club football with his local club Macroom and captained Macroom teams at all levels from underage to senior level. He was a member of the Macroom team that won the U14 County Schools Shield in 1967, defeating Youghal in the final. He won Mid-Cork medals at U16 level in 1970, five Minor medals from 1968 to 1972, and two U21 medals in 1972 and 1974. At adult level he won Muskerry Cup medals in 1981 and 1982, an Intermediate Football League medal in 1981 and captained the Macroom team to win the County Intermediate Football Championship in 1982, to return to Senior ranks in 1983. He played his last Championship game with Macroom against St. Nick's in May 1983, with Macroom winning by 1–9 to 0–7.

=== Inter-County Minor & U21 ===
Creedon first came to prominence on the inter-county scene in 1972 as a member of the Cork Minor Football team that defeated Kerry 2–14 to 1–14 to win the Munster title and then went on to win the All-Ireland title, defeating Tyrone by 3–11 to 2–11. Creedon enjoyed further success at U21 level when he won a Munster winners' medal in 1974 when Cork beat Kerry 3-05 to 1–10 in the Munster Final.

=== Inter-County Senior ===
Creedon made his debut for the Cork Seniors in a National League game against Roscommon in 1975. His first Senior Football Championship game for Cork was against Clare in 1976. Creedon went on to play in nine Munster finals (including two replays) losing each time to Kerry. Despite this lack of championship success Creedon added a National League winners' medal to his collection in 1980.

=== Inter-Provincial ===
Creedon represented Munster at inter-provincial level and was a member of the Munster teams that won the Railway Cup in 1977 and 1981.

== Death ==
Creedon died on 28 August 1983 (the morning of the 1983 All Ireland semi-final between Dublin and Cork), having been seriously injured in an accident involving a runaway van. His death was felt throughout the GAA community in Ireland and robbed Macroom, and Cork, of one of its greatest players.

== Legacy ==
=== Poems ===
The noted contemporary Irish poet and academic Bernard O'Donoghue dedicated his poem 'Munster Final' to Creedon and references the player in the second verse.

=== Tom Creedon Cup ===
The Tom Creedon Cup was presented by the Creedon family to Macroom GAA, Muskerry GAA and the Cork GAA County Board in memory of Macroom and Cork footballer Tom Creedon who died tragically in 1983. The Tom Creedon Cup competition commenced in 1985. The competition is open to all Intermediate football teams in Cork and is currently run off as a pre-season competition. Fittingly, Macroom are the joint top winners of the Cup having won the competition three times (along with Castletownbere and Mallow).

=== Tom Creedon Park ===
Macroom GAA acquired lands on the western side of Macroom in the late 1990s. The Club developed these into two playing pitches, a warm-up area and riverside walk and called the grounds 'Tom Creedon Park'.
