= Jack Lynch (disambiguation) =

Jack Lynch (1917–1999) was an Irish politician.

Jack Lynch may also refer to:

- Jack Lynch (rugby league) (1900–1966), Australian rugby league footballer
- Jack Lynch (baseball) (1857–1923), baseball player
- Jack Lynch (ice hockey) (born 1952), Canadian ice hockey player
- Jack Lynch (West Adelaide footballer) (1929–2018), Australian rules footballer for West Adelaide
- Jack Lynch (footballer, born 1905) (1905–1979), Australian rules footballer for North Melbourne
- Jack Lynch (footballer, born 1918) (1918–1944), Australian rules footballer for Geelong
- Jack Lynch (footballer, born 1995), English footballer
- Jack Lynch, mass murderer during the 1840s of the Berrima District who was later hanged at the Berrima Gaol in 1842
- John J. "Jack" Lynch, database systems project manager and candidate in the United States House of Representatives elections in Michigan, 2010

== See also ==
- Jack Lynch Tunnel, Cork, Ireland
- John Lynch (disambiguation)
