= Charlie Paye =

Irish Gaelic footballer

Charles Paye
Personal information
- Native name: Cathal Páigh (Irish)
- Born: 3 October 1886 Fermoy, County Cork, Ireland
- Died: 26 June 1966 (aged 79) Glasheen, Cork, Ireland
- Occupations: Painter and decorator

Sport
- Sport: Gaelic Football
- Position: Forward
Club
- Years: Club
- 1900s–1920s: Fermoy
Club titles
- Cork titles: 2
Inter-county*
| Years | County | Apps (scores) |
| 1905–1911 | Cork | 12 (4–10) |
Inter-county titles
- Munster titles: 2
- All-Irelands: 1
- *Inter County team apps and scores correct as of 21:20, 10 April 2012.

Charles Kay Paye (3 October 1886 – 26 June 1966) was an Irish Gaelic footballer who played as a forward for the Cork senior team.

Paye made his first appearance for the team during the delayed 1905 championship and was a regular member of the starting fifteen until the completion of the 1911 championship. During that time he won one All-Ireland medal and two Munster medals.

At club level Paye was a double county championship medalist with Fermoy.
