= Miah Burke =

Irish hurler

Personal information
- Nickname: Miah
- Born: 1897 Cork, Ireland

Sport
- Sport: Hurling
- Position: Goalkeeper
Club
- Years: Club
- 1920s-1930s: Collins
Club titles
- Cork titles: 0
Inter-county
Years	County	Apps (scores)
1927-1929	Cork	13 (0-0)
Inter-county titles
- Munster titles: 3
- All-Irelands: 2
- NHL: 0

Jeremiah 'Miah' Burke (born 1897 in Cork, Ireland) was an Irish sportsperson. He played hurling with his local club Collins and was a member of the Cork senior inter-county team from 1927 until 1929.

== Playing career ==
=== Inter-county ===
Burke first came to prominence on the inter-county scene as a member of the Cork team that won a second consecutive Munster title in 1927 with a 5-3 to 3-4 victory over Clare. It was his first provincial winners' medal. The subsequent All-Ireland final saw Cork take on Burke's native county of Dublin once again. Cork fell behind by 2-3 to 0-1 at half-time; however, they fought back in the second-half. In a team made up of nine members of the Garda Síochána ‘the Dubs’ claimed the victory by 4-8 to 1-3.

In 1928 Cork faced Clare in the Munster final for the second year in-a-row. That game ended in a draw, however, in the replay Cork triumphed with Burke collecting his second consecutive Munster title. Cork later defeated Dublin in the All-Ireland semi-final before lining out against Galway in the championship decider. Galway got a bye into the final without picking up a hurley, however, the game turned into a rout. A score line of 6-12 to 1-0 gave Cork the victory and gave Burke an All-Ireland winners' medal.

In 1929 Cork retained their provincial dominance for a fourth consecutive year. A 4-6 to 2-3 defeat of Waterford gave Burke his third Munster title in three provincial campaigns. The subsequent All-Ireland final was a replay of the previous year’s game as Cork played Galway once again. Mick Ahern scored a goal for Cork after just 25 seconds to start another rout. Cork won the day by 4-9 to 1-3 giving Burke his second All-Ireland title. It was his last appearance with Cork.
