= 2010 Cork Intermediate Football Championship =

70th staging of the Cork Intermediate Football Championship

- Dates: 14 May – 17 October 2010
- Teams: 16
- Sponsor: Evening Echo
- Champions: Macroom (3rd title); Fintan Goold (captain); Noel Twomey (manager)
- Runners-up: Kildorrery; Ronan Sheehan (manager)
- Relegated: Courcey Rovers

Tournament statistics
- Matches played: 29
- Goals scored: 45 (1.55 per match)
- Points scored: 541 (18.66 per match)
- Top scorer(s): Daniel Goulding (2-22)

The 2010 Cork Intermediate Football Championship was the 75th staging of the Cork Intermediate Football Championship since its establishment by the Cork County Board. The draw for the opening round fixtures took place on 13 December 2009. The championship ran from 14 May to 17 October 2010.

The final was played on 17 October 2010 at Páirc Uí Chaoimh in Cork, between Macroom and Kildorrery, in what was their first ever meeting in the final. Macroom won the match by 1-09 to 0-10 to claim their third championship title overall and a first title in 20 years.

== Results ==
=== First round ===
14 May 2010 First round	Aghabullogue	0-08 - 1-04	Fermoy	Dr Croke Park
	J Corkery 0-3, P Finnegan 0-3, J Hogan 0-1, D Twomey 0-1.		S McCarthy 1-0, R O'Callaghan 0-2, J Hutchins 0-1, T Clancy 0-1.

15 May 2010 First round	Castletownbere	0-10 - 0-11	Glanworth	Ballinacarriga Grounds
	D Fenton 0-3, A O'Regan 0-2, T Collins 0-1, A O'Sulllivan 0-1, D Murphy 0-1 S O'Regan 0-1, D Bán O'Sullivan 0-1.		M Sheehan 0-4, M Pearse 0-3, D Pyne 0-2, C Pyne 0-1, R O'Driscoll 0-1.

15 May 2010 First round	Courcey Rovers	0-04 - 0-08	Adrigole	Ballinacarriga Grounds
	S Moloney 0-2, O Crowley 0-2.		K Goggin 0-4, G Green 0-1, TJ O'Sullivan 0-1, B Goggin 0-1, E Jer O'Sullivan 0-1.

15 May 2010 First round	Kinsale	0-09 - 1-11	Ballyclough	Cloughduv Grounds
	B Coughlan 0-4, A Gould 0-3, C Quigley 0-1, D Murphy 0-1.		C O'Neill 1-8, S Smyth 0-2, T O'Neill 0-1.

15 May 2010 First round	Cill na Martra	0-08 - 0-11	Kildorrery	Páirc Eoin Mhic Charthaigh
	C Ó hUidhir 0-5, S Ó Céilleachair 0-1, P Ó Duinnín 0-1, N Ó Laoire 0-1.		T Monaghan 0-4, S Coughlan 0-4, E O'Connor 0-1, D Kelly 0-1, J Howard 0-1.

15 May 2010 First round	Canovee	0-09 - 2-12	Éire Óg	Páirc Uí Chonchúir
	P Dunlea 0-5, E Lyons 0-1, D O'Sullivan 0-1, T McCarthy 0-1, G Ahern 0-1.		D Goulding 0-6, B Corkery 1-0, V Fahy 1-0, J Dineen 0-3, A O'Mahony 0-1, C Sheehan 0-1, K Hallissey 0-1.

16 May 2010 First round	Macroom	0-14 - 0-10	Ballydesmond	Kanturk Grounds
	D Goold 0-4, O Murphy 0-4, F Goold 0-2, G Morris 0-2, S Dunne 0-1, C O'Sullivan 0-1.		D O'Connor 0-7, D Kelleher 0-1, J Healy 0-1, D Kelly 0-1.

16 May 2010 First round	Killavullen	2-09 - 1-10	Youghal	Páirc Mhic Gearailt
	A O'Driscoll 1-1, I O'Gorman 1-0, C O'Connell 0-2, B Norris 0-2, L Dorgan 0-1, P Hartnett 0-1, B Hayes 0-1, D Dorgan 0-1.		L Desmond 0-5, P O'Driscoll 1-0, B Coleman 0-2, J O'Mahony 0-2, J Ormonde 0-1.

=== Second round ===
12 June 2010 Second round	Canovee	0-12 - 1-05	Courcey Rovers	Charlie Hurley Park
	P Dunlea 0-6, C Dunne 0-2, D Ring 0-1, P Healy 0-1, E Lyons 0-1, S O'Connor 0-1.		O Gately 1-2, G Moloney 0-1, P Ryan 0-1, B Hayes 0-1.

12 June 2010 Second round	Castletownbere	1-12 - 1-11	Youghal	Cloughduv Grounds
	A O'Regan 0-5, A Harrington 1-1, A O'Sullivan 0-3, L Harrington 0-1, T Collins 0-1, S Regan 0-1.		P Moylan 0-6, J O'Mahony 1-1, N Roche 0-1, K Dempsey 0-1, B O'Sullivan 0-1, S Lyons 0-1.

18 June 2010 Second round	Cill na Martra	0-12 - 2-04	Kinsale	St Mary's Park
	M Ó Conchúir 0-5, C Ó Súilleabháin 0-2, D Ó Conaill 0-1, M Ó Duinnín 0-1, D Óg Ó Laoire 0-1, C Ó hUidhir 0-1, P Ó Duinnín 0-1.		B Coughlan 1-2, C Quigley 1-0, A Gould 0-1, D Shortall 0-1.

19 June 2010 Second round	Fermoy	3-06 - 1-11	Ballydesmond	Liam O'Connell Memorial Park
	B O'Sullivan 1-0, R O'Callaghan 1-1, J Campion 0-3, J Hutchings 0-1, R O'Hagan 0-1.		D Kelleher 1-1, D O'Connor 0-4, N Fleming 0-3, LJ Murphy 0-2, N O'Sullivan 0-1.

=== Third round ===
27 June 2010 Third round	Youghal	3-09 - 0-08	Ballydesmond	Liam O'Connell Memorial Park
	J O'Mahony 2-1, J Ormonde 1-1, P Moylan 0-3, N Roche 0-2, K Dempsey 0-1, E Coleman 0-1.		N Fleming 0-4, LJ Murphy 0-2, N O'Leary 0-1, P Breen 0-1.

27 June 2010 Third round	Courcey Rovers	0-06 - 0-12	Kinsale	Belgooly Grounds
	D Murray 0-2, B Hayes 0-2, S Hayes 0-1, J Duggan 0-1.		B Coughlan 0-5, A Gould 0-4, R O'Sullivan 0-1, D Coughlan 0-1, D Ward 0-1.

=== Relegation playoff ===
3 October 2010 Relegation playoff	Ballydesmond	0-14 - 1-06	Courcey Rovers	Páirc Eoin Mhic Charthaigh
	D O'Connor 0-4, M O'Leary 0-3, N Fleming 0-3, LJ Murphy 0-1, D Kelleher 0-1, P Breen 0-1, D Kelly 0-1.		S Hayes 1-1, S Ryan 0-1, B Hayes 0-1, S Moloney 0-1, O Gateley 0-1, J O'Regan 0-1.

=== Fourth round ===
31 July 2010 Fourth round	Kinsale	1-11 - 3-08	Kildorrery	Glenville Grounds
	B Coughlan 0-7, A Gould 1-2, J Keohane 0-1, M Coughlan 0-1.		E O'Connor 1-3, T Monaghan 1-2, A O'Brien 1-1, S FItzgerald 0-1, D Kelly 0-1.

3 August 2010 Fourth round	Canovee	0-11 - 0-11	KIllavullen	Blarney Grounds
	D Ring 0-6, S O'Connor 0-3, C Dunne 0-2.		D Dorgan 0-4, B Norris 0-2, C O'Connell 0-2, D Luddy 0-1, J O'Neill 0-1, B O'Driscoll 0-1.

7 August 2010 Fourth round	Aghabullogue	1-07 - 0-13	Cill na Martra	Castle Grounds
	P Finnegan 1-2, J Hogan 0-3, B Kiely 0-1, P Murphy 0-1.		M Ó Conchúir 0-5, M Ó Duinnín 0-2, N Ó Laoire 0-2, P Ó hAodha 0-1, C Mac Suibhne 0-1, C Ó hUidhir 0-1, D Óg Ó Laoire 0-1.

7 August 2010 Fourth round	allyclough	0-08 - 2-08	Castletownbere	Uíbh Laoire GAA Grounds
	C O'Neill 0-4, S Smyth 0-2, D O'Herlihy 0-1, T O'Shea 0-1.		D Murphy 1-3, A O'Regan 0-4, B Regan 1-0, D Fenton 0-1.

7 August 2010 Fourth round replay	Canovee	2-10 - 0-10	KIllavullen	Blarney Grounds
	D Ring 1-4, S O'Connor 1-1, T Lyons 0-1, D O'Sullivan 0-1, C Dunne 0-1, G Aherne 0-1, J Shanahan 0-1.		D Dorgan 0-5, B O'Driscoll 0-1, C O'Connell 0-1, L Dorgan 0-1, A O'Driscoll 0-1, J O'Neill 0-1.

7 August 2010 Fourth round	Adrigole	1-10 - 1-09	Glanworth	Páirc Naomh Eoin
	B Ger O'Sullivan 1-2, K Jer O'Sullivan 0-5, K Goggin 0-2, T Joe O'Sullivan 0-1.		P O'Driscoll 0-6, M Pierce 1-0, D Pyne 0-2, M Sheehan 0-1.

24 August 2010 Fourth round	Youghal	1-04 - 0-08	Éire Óg	Caherlag Grounds
	S Lyons 1-0, P Moylan 0-2, J Grace 0-1, K Dempsey 0-1.		D Goulding 0-5, J Dineen 0-2, C Sheehan 0-1.

- Fermoy and Macroom received byes in this round.

=== Quarter-finals ===
15 August 2010 Quarter-final	Kildorrery	0-09 - 0-08	Canovee	Páirc Eoin Mhic Charthaigh
	T Monaghan 0-4, J Howard 0-3, D White 0-1, A O'Brien 0-1.		D Ring 0-3, T McCarthy 0-2, T Lyons 0-1, J Cunningham 0-1, S O'Connor 0-1.

21 August 2010 Quarter-final	Castletownbere	2-12 - 1-09	Adrigole	Cahermore Grounds
	D Murphy 1-2, A O'Regan 0-5, J Murphy 1-0, S O'Regan 0-1, A O'Sullivan 0-1, D Bán Sullivan 0-1, L Harrington 0-1, D Fenton 0-1.		K Jer O'Sullivan 0-4, J Batt O'Sullivan 1-0, D Harrington 0-3, K Goggin 0-1, E Jer O'Sullivan 0-1.

25 August 2010 Quarter-final	Éire Óg	1-15 - 0-11	Cill na Martra	Carrigadrohid Grounds
	D Goulding 1-5, J Dineen 0-6, C Sheehan 0-2, K Hallissey 0-1, A O'Connor 0-1.		M Ó Conchúir 0-7, S Ó Duinnín 0-2, M Ó Duinnín 0-1, N Ó Laoire 0-1.

25 August 2010 Quarter-final	Macroom	2-10 - 1-05	Fermoy	Páirc Uí Rinn
	G Morris 1-2, D Goold 1-1, F Goold 0-4, O Murphy 0-1, C O'Sullivan 0-1, J Ryan 0-1.		J Hutchings 1-2, R Callaghan 0-2, T Clancy 0-1.

=== Semi-finals ===
26 September 2010 Semi-final	Macroom	1-11 - 0-09	Castletownbere	Aughaville Grounds
	B Lynch 1-1, D Goold 0-3, G Morris 0-2, F Goold 0-2, O Murphy 0-1, T Dineen 0-1, J Ryan 0-1.		A O'Regan 0-5, L Harrington 0-2, D O'Sullivan 0-1, A Harrington 0-1.

2 October 2010 Semi-final	Kildorrery	2-10 - 2-09	Éire Óg	Páirc Uí Rinn
	S Fitzgerald 1-3, E O'Connor 1-0, A O'Brien 0-2, T Monaghan 0-2, D Kelly 0-2, J Howard 0-1.		D Goulding 1-6, S McCarthy 1-0, C Lowney 0-1, K Hallissey 0-1, A O'Connor 0-1.

=== Final ===
17 October 2005 Final	Macroom	1-09 - 0-10	Kildorrery	Páirc Uí Chaoimh
	D Goold 1-1, G Morris 0-3, S Kiely 0-2, F Goold 0-1, B Lynch 0-1, C Murphy 0-1.		A O'Brien 0-6, E O'Connor 0-1, T Monaghan 0-1, M Monaghan 0-1, J Howard 0-1.	Referee: J Dorgan (Nemo Rangers)

== Championship statistics ==
=== Top scorers ===
Rank	Player	Club	Tally	Total	Matches	Average
1	Daniel Goulding	Éire Óg	2-22	28	4	7.00
2	Brian Coughlan	Kinsale	1-18	21	4	5.25
3	Alan O'Regan	Castletownbere	0-21	21	5	4.20
4	Darragh Ring	Canovee	1-14	17	5	3.60
5	Martin Ó Conchúir	Cill na Martra	0-17	17	4	4.25
6	Tom Monaghan	Kildorrery	1-13	16	5	3.20
7	David Goold	Macroom	2-09	15	4	3.75
7	Colm O'Neill	Ballyclough	1-12	15	2	7.50
7	Donnacha O'Connor	Ballydesmond	0-15	15	3	5.00
