= 1938 Cork Junior Football Championship =

Irish Gaelic football competition

- Champions: Dromtarriffe (2nd title)
- Runners-up: Ballincollig

The 1938 Cork Junior Football Championship was the 40th staging of the Cork Junior Football Championship since its establishment by the Cork County Board in 1895.

The final was played on 11 December 1938 at Coachford Sportsfield, between Dromtarriffe and Ballincollig, in what was their first ever meeting in the final. Dromtarriffe won the match by 2–04 to 1–01 to claim their second championship title overall and a first championship title in four years.

== Results ==
=== Final ===
11 December 1938 Final	Dromtarriffe	2-04 - 1-01	Ballincollig	Coachford Sportsfield
