= 1929 Cork Senior Football Championship =

Gaelic football competition

- Dates: 7 April – 10 November 1929
- Teams: 13
- Champions: Collins (1st title)
- Runners-up: Macroom

Tournament statistics
- Matches played: 10
- Goals scored: 34 (3.4 per match)
- Points scored: 61 (6.1 per match)

The 1929 Cork Senior Football Championship was the 41st staging of the Cork Senior Football Championship since its establishment by the Cork County Board in 1887. The draw for the first round fixtures took place on 29 January 1929. The championship ran from 7 April to 10 November 1929.

University College Cork were the defending champions.

The final was played on 10 November 1929 at the Mardyke in Cork, between Macroom and Collins, in what was their first ever meeting in the final. Macroom won the match by 1–01 to 0–02, however, Collins were later awarded the title after their objection to the county board was upheld.

== Results ==
=== First round ===
7 April 1929 First round	Duhallow United	3-07 - 0-02	Geraldines

14 April 1929 First round	Fermoy	0-05 - 0-04	Nils	Mallow Town Park

28 April 1929 First round	Macroom	4-03 - 3-01	Beara	Bantry Grounds

28 April 1929 First round	Nemo Rangers	2-05 - 1-01	Lees	The Mardyke

5 May 1929 First round	University College Cork	0-05 - 1-01	Na Deasúnaigh	The Mardyke

First round	Collins	w/o - scr.	Youghal

- Buttevant received a bye in this round but later withdrew.

=== Second round ===
16 June 1929 Second round	University College Cork	6-03 - 0-02	Fermoy	Riverstown Sportsfield

23 June 1929 Second round	Nemo Rangers	0-01 - 6-02	Collins	The Mardyke

- Duhallow United and Macroom received a bye in this round due to Buttevant's withdrawal.

=== Semi-finals ===
28 July 1929 Second round	Macroom	3-06 - 0-00	Duhallow United	The Mardyke

8 September 1929 Second round	Collins	3-07 - 0-02	University College Cork	Cork Athletic Grounds

=== Final ===
29 September 1929 Final	Macroom	1-02 - 1-02	Collins	Cork Athletic Grounds

=== Final replay ===
10 November 1929 Final	Macroom	1-01 - 0-02 (void)	Collins	The Mardyke

== Championship statistics ==
=== Miscellaneous ===
- Collins objected to Macroom's title win on the grounds that two of their players were illegal, as one had played in that year's Kerry SFC and the other in the Waterford SFC. The objection to one of the players was not proved after an investigation, however, the second player admitted that he was illegal. The county board voted to award the title to Collins.
