= Ted O'Mahony =

Irish hurler

Personal information
- Native name: Tadhg Ó Mathúna (Irish)
- Born: 1940 (age 85–86) Cloughduv, County Cork, Ireland
- Height: 5 ft 7 in (170 cm)

Sport
- Sport: Hurling
- Position: Left wing-back
Club
- Years: Club
- CLoughduv
Club titles
- Cork titles: 0
Inter-county
Years	County	Apps (scores)
1966-1968	Cork	0 (0-00)
Inter-county titles
- Munster titles: 1
- All-Irelands: 1
- NHL: 0

Ted O'Mahony (born 1940) is an Irish retired hurler. He played hurling at club level with Cloughduv and at inter-county level as a member of the Cork senior hurling team.

== Honours ==
Cork

- All-Ireland Senior Hurling Championship (1): 1966
- Munster Senior Hurling Championship (1): 1966
