= 1982 Cork Intermediate Football Championship =

Gaelic football competition

- Champions: Macroom (1st title); Tom Creedon (captain)
- Runners-up: Bandon; Robert Wilmot (captain)

The 1982 Cork Intermediate Football Championship was the 47th staging of the Cork Intermediate Football Championship since its establishment by the Cork County Board in 1909.

The final was played on 31 October 1982 at the Cloughduv Grounds, between Macroom and Bandon, in what was their first ever meeting in the final. Macroom won the match by 1-12 to 1-08 to claim their first ever championship title.

== Results ==
=== Semi-finals ===
17 October 1982 Semi-final	Bandon	1-05 - 0-03	Glanmire	Ovens Grounds

=== Final ===
31 October 1982 Final	Macroom	1-12 - 1-08	Bandon	Cloughduv Grounds
	L Gould 1-5, T O'Sullivan 0-2, E Gould 0-2, G Fitzgerald 0-1, B Lynch 0-1, C Corrigan 0-1.		N Crowley 1-2, L O'Mahony 0-3, G Gabriel 0-1, P McCarthy 0-1, P Crowley 0-1.
