= 1990 Cork Intermediate Football Championship =

Gaelic football competition

- Dates: 21 April - 14 October 1990
- Teams: 19
- Champions: Macroom (2nd title); John O'Connor (captain)
- Runners-up: Castletownbere; Christy Collins (captain)

Tournament statistics
- Matches played: 20
- Goals scored: 39 (1.95 per match)
- Points scored: 352 (17.6 per match)
- Top scorer(s): Anthony Barry (2-14); Martin O'Sullivan (0-20)

The 1990 Cork Intermediate Football Championship was the 55th staging of the Cork Intermediate Football Championship since its establishment by the Cork County Board in 1909. The draw for the opening round fixtures took place on 17 December 1989. The championship ran from 21 April to 14 October 1990.

The final was played on 14 October 1990 at Sam Maguire Park in Dunmanway, between Macroom and Castletownbere, in what was their first ever final meeting. Macroom won the match by 2–10 to 1–07 to claim their second championship title overall and a first title in eight years.

== Results ==
=== First round ===
21 April 1990 First round	Millstreet	1-06 - 0-07	Aghada	Ballincollig Grounds
	M Thornton 1-0, JW O'Leary 0-2, L Dennehy 0-2, A Barry 0-1, D O'Mahony 0-1.		R Lewis 0-5, S O'Keeffe 0-1, D Creedon 0-1.

6 May 1990 First round	Fermoy	0-05 - 0-10	Bandon	Church Road
	M Hennessy 0-3, M Dolan 0-1, P Donnellan 0-1.		M O'Donovan 0-4, N Crowley 0-2, M Lyons 0-2, D Minehane 0-1, D Long 0-1.

6 May 1990 First round	Mallow	0-08 - 1-06	St. Finbarr's	Blarney Grounds
	R Sheehan 0-4, G Buckley 0-3, J Hayes 0-1.		J Scanlon 0-4, J Keating 1-0, P O'Shea 0-1, B Connell 0-1.

=== Second round ===
29 April 1990 Second round	Midleton	2-08 - 3-13	Nemo Rangers	Páirc Uí Chonaill
	C O'Neill 1-3, D Quirke 1-0, V O'Neill 0-2, J Boylan 0-1, G Glavin 0-1, N O'Neill 0-1.		M Dorgan 2-4, J O'Callaghan 1-2, J Coogan 0-2, B Allen 0-2, T Griffin 0-1, G O'Regan 0-1, D O'Driscoll 0-1.

5 May 1990 Second round	Delaneys	1-13 - 1-10	Mayfield	Bishopstown Grounds
	C Walsh 1-3, B Egan 0-3, G Healy 0-3, D McElhinney 0-2, M Moynihan 0-1, M Keenan 0-1.		M Hurley 0-6, R Walsh 1-0, M Huggins 0-2, K O'Sullivan 0-1, P O'Sullivan 0-1.

6 May 1990 Second round	Douglas	1-09 - 0-15	Ballincollig	Kilbarry Grounds
	D Larkin 0-7, P Walsh 1-0, E Forde 0-1, B Newton 0-1.		P Hehir 0-4, T O'Reilly 0-3, B McCarthy 0-2, D Lucey 0-2, C O'Connell 0-2, P Twomey 0-1, K O'Mahony 0-1.

19 May 1990 Second round	Kilmurry	1-06 - 0-09	Clyda Rovers	Páirc Eoin Mac Cárthaigh
	S Kearney 1-1, S Murphy 0-3, S O'Leary 01, PJ O'Leary 0-1.		G Lane 0-5, R Walsh 0-2, C O'Sullivan 0-1, M Hanlon 0-1.

20 May 1990 Second round	St. Finbarr's	2-06 - 3-08	Castletownbere	Sam Maguire Park
	T Power 1-4, K Nagle 1-0, P O'Shea 0-1, J Keating 0-1.		G O'Sullivan 1-2, J Power 1-1, F O'Sullivan 1-0, M O'Sullivan 0-2, C Collins 0-2, N Murphy 0-1.

20 May 1990 Second round	Macroom	1-13 - 1-09	Bantry Blues	Ballingeary Grounds
	F Corrigan 1-1, E Gould 0-3, J Neville 0-3, N Twomey 0-2, G McPolin 0-1, T Twomey 0-1, J O'Connor 0-1, N Kelleher 0-1.		L O'Brien 1-2, K Harrington 0-5, P Goggin 0-1, B Spillane 0-1.

20 May 1990 Second round	Bandon	2-02 - 0-14	Millstreet	Carrigadrohid Grounds
	D Minihane 1-0, B McSweeney 1-0, F Lyons 0-1, M O'Donovan 0-1.		A Barry 0-6, JW O'Leary 0-2, F Collins 0-2, W O'Leary 0-1, C O'Connor 0-1, L Dennehy 0-1, M Thornton 0-1.

26 May 1990 Second round	Valley Rovers	0-07 - 1-06	Naomh Abán	Carrigadrohid Grounds
	A Crowley 0-2, J O'Donovan 0-2, B O'Sullivan 0-1, J Shiels 0-1, C O'Donovan 0-1.		J Creedon 1-2, D Lynch 0-2, K Lynch 0-1, P Lucey 0-1.

2 June 1990 Second round replay	Kilmurry	2-08 - 0-11	Clyda Rovers	Páirc Eoin Mac Cárthaigh
	Denis Moss 1-1, C Barry-Murphy 1-1, S Murphy 0-3, J O'Leary 0-1, M Kelleher 0-1, TJ O'Leary 0-1.		C O'Sullivan 0-3, G Lane 0-3, M O'Hanlon 0-2, R Walsh 0-2, G O'Sullivan 0-1.

=== Quarter-finals ===
21 July 1990 Quarter-final	Delaneys	1-09 - 0-11	Kilmurry	Éire Óg Grounds
	M Moynihan 1-1, P Crowley 0-4, B Egan 0-2, D McElhinney 0-1, G Healy 0-1.		S Murphy 0-3, TJ O'Leary 0-3, L Drommey 0-1, C Barry-Murphy 0-1, D O'Sullivan 0-1, M Kelleher 0-1, S Kearney 0-1.

22 July 1990 Quarter-final	Nemo Rangers	0-09 - 0-08	Ballincollig	Ballinora Grounds
	J Kavanagh 0-6, J Coogan 0-1, S Hayes 0-1, J O'Callaghan 0-1.		T O'Reilly 0-5, P O'Hare 0-2, D Lucey 0-1.

22 July 1990 Quarter-final	Macroom	0-09 - 0-07	Naomh Abán	Clondrohid Grounds
	N Twomey 0-3, G McPolin 0-3, N Kelleher 0-1, J O'Connor 0-1, S Coughlan 0-1.		D Lynch 0-3, D Healy 0-2, D McCarthy 0-1, T Ó Tuama 0-1.

22 July 1990 Quarter-final	Castletownbere	1-10 - 2-07	Millstreet	Wolfe Tone Park
	S Downey 1-0, M O'Sullivan 0-3, G O'Sullivan 0-3, C Collins 0-2, N Harrington 0-1, S Spencer 0-1.		J O'Keeffe 1-1, A Barry 0-4, D O'Mahony 1-0, W O'Leary 0-1, L Dennehy 0-1.

19 August 1990 Quarter-final replay	Castletownbere	0-12 - 2-05	Millstreet	Wolfe Tone Park
	M O'Sullivan 0-8, C Collins 0-2, G O'Sullivan 0-1, F McCarthy 0-1.		A Barry 2-3, T O'Connor 0-1, JW O'Leary 0-1.

=== Semi-finals ===
25 August 1990 Semi-final	Macroom	1-12 - 1-10	Nemo Rangers	Ballincollig Grounds
	JJ Murphy 1-6, N Twomey 0-3, J Neville 0-1, G McPolin 0-1, E Gould 0-1.		C Murphy 1-3, J O'Callaghan 0-5, J Collins 0-1, S Hayes 0-1.	Referee: N Barrett (Carrigtwohill)

9 September 1990 Semi-final	Castletownbere	3-09 - 2-08	Delaneys	Sam Maguire Park
	J Power 2-0, F O'Sullivan 1-0, G O'Sullivan 0-3, M O'Sullivan 0-3, C Collins 0-1, S Spencer 0-1, F McCarthy 0-1.		P Crowley 0-8, B Egan 1-0, M Moynihan 1-0.	Referee: M Brosnan (Caheragh)

=== Final ===
14 October 1990 Final	Macroom	2-10 - 1-07	Castletownbere	Sam Maguire Park
	G McPolin 1-1, N Twomey 1-1, JJ Murphy 0-3, J Neville 0-2, J O'Connor 0-1, N Kelleher 0-1, J White 0-1.		M O'Sullivan 0-4, J Power 1-0, F O'Sullivan 0-1, S Spencer 0-1, C Collins 0-1.

== Championship statistics ==
=== Top scorers ===
Overall

Rank	Player	Club	Tally	Total	Matches	Average
1	Anthony Barry	Millstreet	2-14	20	4	5.00
1	Martin O'Sullivan	Castletownbere	0-20	20	5	4.00
3	Joe Power	Castletownbere	4-01	13	5	2.60
3	Gary O'Sullivan	Castletownbere	1-10	13	5	2.60
5	Noel Twomey	Macroom	1-09	12	4	3.00
5	J. J. Murphy	Macroom	1-09	12	4	3.00
5	Paul Crowley	Delaneys	0-12	12	2	6.00

In a single game

Rank	Player	Club	Tally	Total	Opposition
1	Michael Dorgan	Nemo Rangers	2-04	10	Midleton
2	Anthony Barry	Millstreet	2-03	9	Castletownbere
2	J. J. Murphy	Macroom	1-06	9	Nemo Rangers
4	Martin O'Sullivan	Castletownbere	0-08	8	Millstreet
4	Paul Crowley	Delaneys	0-08	8	Castletownbere
6	Tony Power	St. Finbarr's	1-04	7	Castletownbere
6	Dave Larkin	Douglas	0-07	7	Ballincollig
8	Joe Power	Castletownbere	2-00	6	Delaneys
8	Charlie Murphy	Nemo Rangers	1-03	6	Macroom
8	Colm O'Neill	Midleton	1-03	6	Nemo Rangers
8	Christian Walsh	Delaneys	1-03	6	Mayfield
8	Mark Hurley	Mayfield	0-06	6	Delaneys
8	Anthony Barry	Millstreet	0-06	6	Bandon
8	Joe Kavanagh	Nemo Rangers	0-06	6	Ballincollig
