= 1989 All-Ireland Junior Football Championship =

Championship Details
- Dates: 3 May – 10 September 1989
- Teams: 13

All Ireland Champions
- Winners: Cork (8th win)
- Captain: Diarmuid McCarthy
- Manager: Seán Ryan

All Ireland Runners-up
- Runners-up: Warwickshire

Provincial Champions
- Munster: Cork
- Leinster: Kildare
- Ulster: Not Played
- Connacht: Not Played

Championship Statistics
- Matches Played: 12
- Total Goals: 14 (1.16 per game)
- Total Points: 203 (16.91 per game)
- Top Scorer: Noel Twomey (1-16)

The 1989 All-Ireland Junior Football Championship was the 59th staging of the All-Ireland Junior Championship, the Gaelic Athletic Association's second tier Gaelic football championship.

Meath entered the championship as the defending champions, however, they were beaten by Kildare in the Leinster quarter-final.

The All-Ireland final was played on 10 September 1989 in Coventry, between Cork and Warwickshire, in what was their first meeting in the final in two years. Cork won the match by 0–18 to 0–03 to claim their eighth championship title overall and a first title since 1987.

Cork's Noel Twomey was the championship's top scorer with 1-16.

== Results ==
=== Leinster Junior Football Championship ===
==== Leinster quarter-finals ====
3 May 1989 Quarter-final	Louth	0-10 - 0-05	Dublin	Drogheda Park
	C O'Hanlon 0-3, L Kelleher 0-2, G Reynolds 0-2, N Browne 0-1, P Butterley 0-1, P O'Connor 0-1.		M Barnes 0-4, B Holland 0-1.

3 May 1989 Quarter-final	Meath	2-04 - 2-06	Kildare	Walterstown Grounds
	J Henry 1-1, S Reilly 1-0, T Matthews 0-2, L Smith 0-1.		S Merrins 1-3, B Farrell 1-1, J Lowry 0-1, T Harris 0-1.

==== Leinster semi-finals ====
17 May 1989 Semi-final	Louth	1-13 - 1-05	Carlow	Drogheda Park
	A O'Connor 1-2, G Reynolds 0-3, P Gallagher 0-3, Martin Morgan 0-3, D McCarthy 0-1, P Butterly 0-1.		J Byrne 1-0, B Murphy 0-3, D Moore 0-1, B Dunne 0-1.

17 May 1989 Semi-final	Kildare	1-12 - 0-11	Kilkenny	St. Conleth's Park
	S Dillon 0-5, J Lowry 1-1, J Tynan 0-3, N Corcoran 0-1, S Merrins 0-1, P McConnon 0-1.		W Blanchfield 0-4, B Smith 0-3, N Connery 0-2, L Cassin 0-1, M Morrissey 0-1.

==== Leinster final ====
11 June 1989 Final	Kildare	1-07 - 1-06	Louth	Páirc Tailteann
	S Merrins 0-4 (3f), J Lowry 1-0, G Donnelly 0-2 (1f), J Tynan 0-1		D McCarthy 1-1, M Malone 0-5 (4f)	Referee: P Kavanagh (Meath)

GK	1	Joe Halligan (Ballykelly)
RCB	2	Noel Connolly (Grange)
FB	3	Shay Walsh (Ballyteague)
LCB	4	Paul Donnelly (Castlemitchell)
RHB	5	Peter McConnon (Round Towers) (c)
CHB	6	Michael Behan (Kill)
LHB	7	Willie Dowling (Eadestown)
MF	8	Tom Travers (Rathcoffey)
MF	9	Bernard Salmon (Suncroft)
RHF	10	Syl Merrins (Nurney)
CHF	11	Gerard Donnelly (Castlemitchell)
LHF	12	Joe Tynan (Castlemitchell)
RCF	13	John Lowry (Clogherinkoe)
FF	14	Joe Tompkins (Two Mile House)
LCF	15	Noel Cocoman (Kill)
Substitutes:
	16	Billy Farrell (Straffan) for Cocoman
	17	Noel Donlon (Round Towers) for Merrins

GK	1	Cathal Copas (Dundalk Gaels)
RCB	2	Gerry Winters (Naomh Máirtín)
FB	3	Hugh Logue (St Kevin's)
LCB	4	Fra Fagan (Roche Emmets)
RHB	5	Stephen Matthews (St Kevin's)
CHB	6	Tony McCarragher (Cooley Kickhams)
LHB	7	Mark Gogarty (Naomh Malachi)
MF	8	Martin Morgan (Naomh Máirtín)
MF	9	Donal McCarthy (St Patrick's)
RHF	10	Alan O'Connor (St Joseph's)
CHF	11	Michael Malone (St Mary's)
LHF	12	Paul Gallagher (Roche Emmets)
RCF	13	Gerry Reynolds (Stabannon Parnells)
FF	14	Pat Mulligan (St Joseph's)
LCF	15	Liam Kelleher (Dreadnots)
Substitutes:
	16	John McDonald (Cooley Kickhams) for Gallagher

=== Munster Junior Football Championship ===
==== Munster quarter-finals ====
14 May 1989 Quarter-final	Limerick	1-06 - 0-12	Waterford	Páirc na nGael
	E McDaid 0-4, M O'Doherty 1-0, W Hanley 0-1, A Shanahan 0-1.		L O'Brien 0-6, C McGrath 0-3, P Ferncombe 0-2, J Dunne 0-1.

14 May 1989 Quarter-final	Tipperary	0-09 - 1-07	Clare	Clonmel GAA Ground
	C Coen 0-3, P Hallissey 0-3, L Connolly 0-2, J Lowry 0-1.		J O'Gorman 0-5, F Carrig 1-1, J Fennell 0-1.

==== Munster semi-finals ====
17 June 1989 Semi-final	Kerry	2-12 - 0-04	Waterford	Mitchelstown Grounds
	S Geaney 2-2, K Culhane 0-4, S McElligott 0-2, S Fitzgerald 0-2, C Walsh 0-1, T Brosnan 0-1.		T Goff 0-2, L O'Brien 0-1, C McCraith 0-1.	Referee: J O'Leary (Na Piarsaigh)

25 June 1989 Semi-final	Cork	0-16 - 0-04	Clare	Páirc Uí Chaoimh
	N Twomey 0-4, J Ring 0-3, K Creed 0-3, N O'Connor 0-3, W O'Riordan 0-2, M Murphy 0-1.		J O'Gorman 0-1, JJ Rouine 0-1, K O'Mahony 0-1, O Downes 0-1.	Referee: P Lonergan (Tipperary)

==== Munster final ====
28 June 1989 Final	Kerry	0-09 - 0-10	Cork	Austin Stack Park
	T Brosnan 0-2, K Culhane 0-2, S Stack 0-1, F Ashe 0-1, S McElligott 0-1, C Walsh 0-1, S Geaney 0-1.		W O'Riordan 0-5, N Twomey 0-2, T Buckley 0-1, G Ring 0-1, G Casey 0-1.

=== All-Ireland Junior Football Championship ===
==== All-Ireland home final ====
16 July 1989 Home final	Cork	1-11 - 0-03	Kildare	Semple Stadium
	N Twomey 1-4, W O'Riordan 0-2, G Casey 0-2, M Murphy 0-1, S Dineen 0-1, N O'Connor 0-1.		S Merrins 0-3.	Referee: J Carney (Roscommon)

==== All-Ireland final ====
10 September 1989 Final	Cork	0-18 - 0-03	Warwickshire	Coventry
	W O'Riordan 0-7, N Twomey 0-6, N O'Connor 0-3, T Buckley 0-1, P Buckley 0-1.		G Butler 0-2, D Cook 0-1.	Referee: M Cranny (Down)

== Championship statistics ==
=== Top scorers ===
Overall

Rank	Player	Club	Tally	Total	Matches	Average
1	Noel Twomey	Cork	1-16	19	4	4.75
2	William O'Riordan	Cork	0-16	16	4	4.00
3	Syl Merrins	Kildare	1-11	14	4	3.50
4	Sean Geaney	Kerry	2-03	9	2	4.50
5	John Lowry	Kildare	2-02	8	4	2.00

In a single game

Rank	Player	Club	Tally	Total	Opposition
1	Sean Geaney	Kerry	2-02	8	Waterford
2	Noel Twomey	Cork	1-04	7	Kildare
2	William O'Riordan	Cork	0-07	7	Warwickshire
4	Syl Merrins	Kildare	1-03	6	Meath
4	Noel Twomey	Cork	0-06	6	Warwickshire
4	Liam O'Brien	Waterford	0-06	6	Limerick
7	Alan O'Connor	Louth	1-02	5	Carlow
7	Donal McCarthy	Louth	1-02	5	Kildare
7	Séamus Dillon	Kildare	0-05	5	Kilkenny
7	Johnny O'Gorman	Clare	0-05	5	Tipperary
