= Jack Lehane =

Irish Gaelic footballer

Personal information
- Native name: Seán Ó Liatháin (Irish)
- Born: 1884 Macroom, County Cork, Ireland
- Died: 18 August 1938 (aged 53) Cork, Ireland
- Occupation: Farmer

Sport
- Sport: Gaelic Football
- Position: Half-back
Club
- Years: Club
- Macroom
Club titles
- Cork titles: 4
Inter-county*
Years	County	Apps (scores)
1907-1911	Cork	15
Inter-county titles
- Munster titles: 2
- All-Irelands: 1
- *Inter County team apps and scores correct as of 17:12, 11 April 2012.

John Lehane (1884 - 18 August 1938) was an Irish Gaelic footballer who played as a forward for the Cork senior team.

Kelleher made his first appearance for the team during the 1907 championship and was a regular member of the starting fifteen for a number of seasons. During that time he won one All-Ireland medal and two Munster medals.

At club level Lehane was a multiple county championship medalist with Macroom.
