= 1934 Cork Junior Football Championship =

Irish Gaelic football competition

- Champions: Dromtarriffe (1st title); R. Harnedy (captain)
- Runners-up: Mitchelstown; D. Scannell (captain)

The 1934 Cork Junior Football Championship was the 36th staging of the Cork Junior Football Championship since its establishment by the Cork County Board in 1895.

The final was played on 18 November 1934 at the Liscarroll Grounds, between Dromtarriffe and Mitchelstown, in what was their first ever meeting in the final. Dromtarriffe won the match by 2–02 to 0–00 to claim their first ever championship title.

== Results ==
=== Final ===
18 November 1934 Final	Dromtarriffe	2-02 - 0-00	Mitchelstown	Liscarroll Grounds
