= John O'Donovan (Gaelic footballer) =

Irish Gaelic footballer

John "Count" O'Donovan
Personal information
- Native name: Seán Ó Donnabháin (Irish)
- Nickname: Count
- Born: 1889 Clonakilty, County Cork, Ireland
- Died: 28 April 1920 (aged 30–31) Clonakilty, County Cork, Ireland

Sport
- Sport: Gaelic football
- Position: Midfield
Clubs
- Years: Club
- Lees; Clonakilty
Inter-county*
Years	County	Apps (scores)
1911-1916	Cork	9
Inter-county titles
- Munster titles: 0
- All-Irelands: 1
- *Inter County team apps and scores correct as of 22:57, 5 May 2014.

John Joseph "Count" O'Donovan (1889 - 28 April 1920) was an Irish Gaelic footballer who played as a midfielder for the Cork senior team.

Born in Clonakilty, County Cork, O'Donovan first arrived on the inter-county scene at the age of twenty-two when he first linked up with the Cork senior team. He made his senior debut in the 1911 championship. O'Donovan went on to play a key part for Cork during a successful period, and won one All-Ireland medal.

At club level O'Donovan was a one-time senior championship medallist with Lees. He also won one intermediate championship medal with Clonakilty.

Throughout his inter-county career, O'Donovan made 9 championship appearances for Cork. His retirement came following the conclusion of the 1916 championship.

== Honours ==
=== Team ===
Lees

- Cork Senior Football Championship (1): 1911

Clonakilty

- Cork Intermediate Football Championship (1): 1913 (c)

Cork

- All-Ireland Senior Football Championship (1): 1911
