= Maurice Murphy (hurler) =

Irish hurler

Personal information
- Native name: Muiris Ó Murchú (Irish)
- Occupation: Army officer

Sport
- Sport: Hurling
- Position: Right corner-back
Club
- Years: Club
- Collins
Club titles
- Cork titles: 0
Inter-county*
Years	County	Apps (scores)
1925-1927	Cork	11 (0-00)
Inter-county titles
- Munster titles: 2
- All-Irelands: 1
- NHL: 1
- *Inter County team apps and scores correct as of 22:42, 6 April 2015.

Maurice Murphy was an Irish hurler who played as a right corner-back for the Cork senior team.

Murphy first arrived on the inter-county scene when he first linked up with the Cork senior team. He made his senior debut during the 1925-26 league. Murphy immediately became a regular member of the starting fifteen, and won one All-Ireland medal, two Munster medals and one National Hurling League medals. He was an All-Ireland runner-up on one occasion.

At club level Murphy played with Collins.

Throughout his career Murphy made 11 championship appearances. He retired from inter-county hurling following the conclusion of the 1927 championship.

== Playing career ==
=== Inter-county ===
Murphy first appeared for Cork as a member of the senior team during the 1925-26 league. It was a successful campaign for Cork and Murphy collected a National Hurling League medal following a 3-7 to 1-5 defeat of Dublin in the decider. He made his senior championship debut on 30 May 1926 in a 12-3 to 5-2 Munster quarter-final defeat of Waterford. Murphy later won his first Munster medal following a three-game saga with Tipperary, culminating in a 3-6 to 2-4 victory for Cork. On 24 October 1926 he lined out in his first senior All-Ireland decider, as Cork faced Kilkenny for the first time since 1912. At a snow-covered Croke Park, the first half was even enough with Cork holding an interval lead of one point, however, Kilkenny slumped in the second half, going down to a 4-6 to 2-0 defeat. The victory gave Murphy an All-Ireland medal.

Cork retained the provincial crown in 1927, with Murphy collecting a second Munster medal following a 5-3 to 3-4 defeat of Clare. He was at right corner-back again for Cork's subsequent All-Ireland meeting with Dublin on 4 September 1927. The Metropolitans were well on top in the opening thirty minutes and took a 2-3 to 0-1 lead at the interval. Cork fought back in the third quarter, however, an expert display of goalkeeping by Tommy Daly saved the day by keeping Mick "Gah" Ahern scoreless, as Dublin went on to win by 4-8 to 1-3. It was Murphy's last championship appearance for Cork.

== Honours ==
=== Player ===
Cork

- All-Ireland Senior Hurling Championship (1): 1926
- Munster Senior Hurling Championship (2): 1926, 1927
- National Hurling League (1): 1925-26
