= 1945 Cork Junior Football Championship =

Irish hurling competition

- Champions: Collins (1st title)
- Runners-up: St Patrick's

The 1945 Cork Junior Football Championship was the 47th staging of the Cork Junior Football Championship since its establishment by the Cork County Board in 1895.

The final, a replay, was played on 20 January 1946 at the Athletic Grounds in Cork, between Collins and St Patrick's, in what was their first ever meeting in the final. Collins won the match by 3–07 to 0–02 to claim their first ever championship title.

== Results ==
=== Final ===
16 December 1945 Final	Collins	1–05 – 2–02	St Patrick's	Cork Athletic Grounds

=== Final replay ===
20 January 1946 Final replay	Collins	3–07 – 0–02	St Patrick's	Cork Athletic Grounds
