= Gene McCarthy (Gaelic footballer) =

Irish Gaelic footballer (born 1938)

Personal information
- Native name: Eoghan Mac Cárthaigh (Irish)
- Born: Rosscarbery, County Cork
- Height: 6 ft 0 in (183 cm)

Sport
- Sport: Gaelic football
- Position: Left wing-forward
Club
- Years: Club
- 1950s-1970s: St Finbarr's
Inter-county
- Years: County
- 1960s: Cork
Inter-county titles
- Munster titles: 2
- All-Irelands: 0
- NFL: 0
- All Stars: 0

Gene McCarthy (born 1938 in Rosscarbery, County Cork) is an Irish former sportsperson. He played Gaelic football with his local club St Finbarr's and was a member of the Cork senior inter-county team in the 1960.
