= 1992 All-Ireland Junior Football Championship =

Inter-county Gaelic football competition held in 1992

All Ireland Champions
- Winners: Wexford (1st win)
- Captain: John Casey
- Manager: Liam Fardy

All Ireland Runners-up
- Runners-up: Cork
- Captain: Niall O'Connor
- Manager: Colman Corrigan

Provincial Champions
- Munster: Cork
- Leinster: Wexford
- Ulster: Not Played
- Connacht: Not Played

The 1992 All-Ireland Junior Hurling Championship was the 62nd staging of the All-Ireland Junior Championship, the Gaelic Athletic Association's second tier Gaelic football championship.

Kerry entered the championship as the defending champions, however, they were beaten by Cork in the Munster quarter-final.

The All-Ireland final was played on 2 August 1992 at Walsh Park in Waterford, between Cork and Wexford, in what was their first ever meeting in the final. Wexford won the match by 1-09 to 0-11 to claim their first ever championship title.

== All-Ireland Junior Football Championship ==
=== All-Ireland semi-finals ===
11 July 1992 Semi-final	Wexford	1-13 - 0-12	Mayo	O'Connor Park

18 July 1992 Semi-final	London	1-04 - 1-09	Cork	Emerald GAA Grounds

=== All-Ireland final ===
2 August 1992 Final	Wexford	1-09 - 0-11	Cork	Walsh Park
