= 1910 Cork Senior Football Championship =

Gaelic football competition

- Champions: Macroom (2nd title); Jack Lehane (captain)
- Runners-up: Cobh

The 1910 Cork Senior Football Championship was the 24th staging of the Cork Senior Football Championship since its establishment by the Cork County Board in 1887.

Macroom entered the championship as the defending champions.

On 28 August 1910, Macroom won the championship following a 5–06 to 0–02 defeat of Cobh in the final at the Cork Athletic Grounds. This was their second championship title overall and their second title in succession.

== Results ==
=== Final ===
28 August 1910 Final	Macroom	5-06 - 0-02	Cobh	Cork Athletic Grounds, Cork
