= John A. Lynch (ferryboat) =

- U.S. National Register of Historic Places
- New York State Register of Historic Places
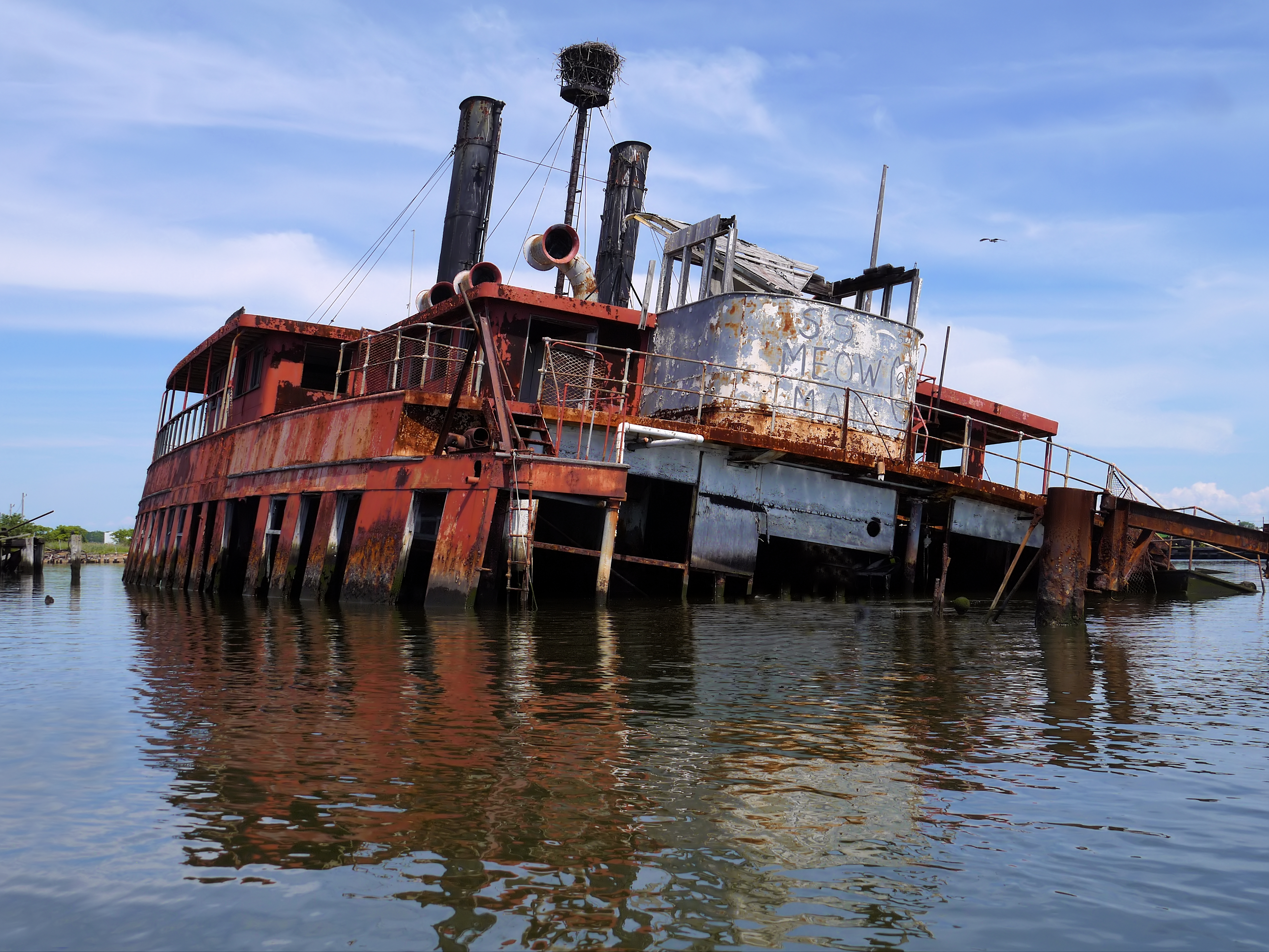
- John A. Lynch as a wreck, seen in 2014

- Location within New Jersey Location within the United States
- Location: Port Reading, New Jersey
- Coordinates: 40.560532°N 74.232159°W
- Built: 1925
- Architect: Staten Island Shipbuilding Co.
- Architectural style: Double-ended harbor ferry
- NRHP reference No.: 84002775
- NYSRHP No.: 06101.002484

Significant dates
- Added to NRHP: September 7, 1984
- Designated NYSRHP: July 25, 1984

The John A. Lynch was a ferryboat built in 1925 in Mariners Harbor, Staten Island, New York. It was named after New Jersey politician John A. Lynch, Sr. by NYC Mayor Hylan as were 15 other ferryboats built at the same time. It was renamed first as the Harlam, then the Major General William H. Hart in 1940 when it was sold to the Army and assigned to Governors Island. In 1968 it was donated to the South Street Seaport Museum where it was used as a school ship until 1990. It was traded to Captain's Cove Seaport, in Bridgeport, Connecticut in exchange for docking proposed for the H.M.S. Rose at South Street for the 1992 Columbus Quincentenary. It was sold in about 2000 and was to be docked in New Jersey, but is currently half sunk and decaying at Port Reading, New Jersey. It was added to the National Register of Historic Places on September 7, 1984.
