= 1913 Cork Senior Football Championship =

Gaelic football competition

- Champions: Macroom (4th title)
- Runners-up: Fermoy

The 1913 Cork Senior Football Championship was the 27th staging of the Cork Senior Football Championship since its establishment by the Cork County Board in 1887.

Macroom entered the championship as the defending champions.

On 7 September 1913, Macroom won the championship following a 1–02 to 0–03 defeat of Fermoy in the final at the Cork Athletic Grounds. This was their fourth championship title overall and their second title in succession.

== Results ==
=== Final ===
7 September 1913 Final	Macroom	1-02 - 0-03	Fermoy	Cork Athletic Grounds, Cork
