= 1986 All-Ireland Minor Football Championship =

Gaelic football competition

Championship details

All-Ireland Champions
- Winning team: Galway (5th win)

All-Ireland Finalists
- Losing team: Cork

Provincial Champions
- Munster: Cork
- Leinster: Dublin
- Ulster: Down
- Connacht: Galway

The 1986 All-Ireland Minor Football Championship was the 55th staging of the All-Ireland Minor Football Championship, the Gaelic Athletic Association's premier inter-county Gaelic football tournament for boys under the age of 18.

Mayo entered the championship as defending champions, however, they were defeated by Galway in the Connacht final.

On 21 September 1986, Galway won the championship following a 3–8 to 2–7 defeat of Cork in the All-Ireland final. This was their fifth All-Ireland title overall and their first in ten championship seasons.

== Results ==
=== Connacht Minor Football Championship ===
Quarter-Final

| 1986 Quarter-Final | Galway | 1-12 - 1-00 | Sligo | St Jarlath's Park, Tuam |

Semi-Finals

| 1986 Semi-Final | Mayo | 1-08 - 0-04 | Roscommon | Dr Hyde Park, Roscommon |

| 1986 Semi-Final | Galway | 4-14 - 1-04 | Leitrim | St Jarlath's Park, Tuam |

Final

| 13 July 1986 Final | Galway | 1-09 - 2-01 | Mayo | Dr Hyde Park, Roscommon |

=== Leinster Minor Football Championship ===
Preliminary Round

| 1986 Preliminary Round | Kilkenny | 1-06 - 3-10 | Carlow | Nowlan Park, Kilkenny |

| 1986 Preliminary Round | Kildare | 2-06 - 1-07 | Wexford | Wexford Park, Wexford |

| 1986 Preliminary Round | Longford | 1-08 - 0-05 | Louth | Drogheda Park, Drogheda |

| 1986 Preliminary Round | Wicklow | 1-11 - 1-10 | Westmeath | Aughrim Park, Aughrim |

Quarter-Finals

| 1986 Quarter-Final | Meath | 2-13 - 0-07 | Carlow | Dr Cullen Park, Carlow |

| 1986 Quarter-Final | Wicklow | 1-10 - 3-05 | Laois | Aughrim Park, Aughrim |

| 1986 Quarter-Final | Dublin | 0-15- 0-06 | Kildare | Parnell Park, Dublin |

| 1986 Quarter-Final | Offaly | 0-03 - 0-05 | Longford | Ballymahon |

Semi-Finals

| 1986 Semi-Final | Dublin | 2-10 - 0-05 | Longford | O'Moore Park, Portlaoise |

| 1986 Semi-Final | Laois | 0-06 - 0-08 | Meath | St Conleth's Park, Newbridge |

Final

| 27 July 1986 Final | Dublin | 2-16 - 0-06 | Meath | Croke Park, Dublin |

=== Munster Minor Football Championship ===
Quarter-Finals

| 1986 Quarter-Final | Cork | 0-07 - 1-04 | Limerick |

| 1986 Quarter-Final Replay | Cork | 3-09 - 1-01 | Limerick | Bruff |

Semi-Finals

| 1986 Semi-Final | Cork | 1-11 - 0-01 | Clare | Mitchelstown |

| 1986 Semi-Final | Waterford | 0-10 - 2-10 | Kerry | Glenflesk |

Final

| 6 July 1986 Final | Cork | 2-12 - 0-04 | Kerry | Fitzgerald Stadium, Killarney |

=== Ulster Minor Football Championship ===
Quarter-Finals

| 1986 Quarter-Final | Down | 2-07 - 1-02 | Donegal | St. Patrick's Park, Newcastle |

| 1986 Quarter-Final | Cavan | 2-08 - 1-05 | Antrim | Casement Park, Belfast |

| 1986 Quarter-Final | Fermanagh | 1-04 - 1-05 | Armagh | St. Molaise Park, Irvinestown |

Semi-Finals

| 1986 Semi-Final | Derry | 3-10 - 1-02 | Cavan | St. Molaise Park, Irvinestown |

| 1986 Semi-Final | Down | 1-09 - 0-12 | Monaghan | St. Mary's Park, Castleblaney |

| 1986 Semi-Final Replay | Down | 3-04 - 0-06 | Monaghan | St. Mary's Park, Castleblaney |

Final

| 20 July 1986 Final | Down | 1-12- 0-10 | Derry | St. Tiernach's Park, Clones |

=== All-Ireland Minor Football Championship ===
Semi-Finals

| 17 August 1986 Semi-Final | Galway | 3-10 - 0-06 | Down | Croke Park, Dublin |

| 24 August 1986 Semi-Final | Dublin | 0-08 - 2-07 | Cork | Croke Park, Dublin |

Final

| 21 September 1986 Final | Galway | 3-08 - 2-07 | Cork | Croke Park, Dublin |
