= 1988 All-Ireland Junior Football Championship =

All Ireland Champions
- Winners: Meath (4th win)
- Captain: John McEnroe

All Ireland Runners-up
- Runners-up: London

Provincial Champions
- Munster: Cork
- Leinster: Meath
- Ulster: Not Played
- Connacht: Not Played

The 1988 All-Ireland Junior Hurling Championship was the 58th staging of the All-Ireland Junior Championship, the Gaelic Athletic Association's second tier Gaelic football championship.

Cork were the defending champions, however, they were beaten by Meath in the All-Ireland home final.

The All-Ireland final was played on 9 October 1988 at Croke Park in Dublin, between Meath and London, in what was their fourth meeting in the final and a first in 26 years. Meath won the match by 1-10 to 0-03 to claim their fourth championship title overall and a first title since 1962.

== Results ==
=== All-Ireland Junior Football Championship ===
==== All-Ireland home final ====
2 July 1988 Home final	Meath	1-09 - 1-05	Cork	O'Moore Park

==== All-Ireland final ====
8 October 1988 Final	Meath	0-14 - 0-03	London	Croke Park

== Championship statistics ==
=== Miscellaneous ===
- The All-Ireland final was played as a curtain raiser to the All-Ireland SFC final replay between Meath and Cork.
