= 1912 Cork Senior Football Championship =

Gaelic football competition

- Champions: Macroom (3rd title); W. Lehane (captain)
- Runners-up: Fermoy; P. Daly (captain)

The 1912 Cork Senior Football Championship was the 26th staging of the Cork Senior Football Championship since its establishment by the Cork County Board in 1887.

Lees entered the championship as the defending champions.

On 25 August 1912, Macroom won the championship following a 1–03 to 1–01 defeat of Fermoy in the final at the Cork Athletic Grounds. This was their third championship title overall and their first title since 1910.

== Results ==
=== Final ===
25 August 1912 Final	Macroom	1-03 - 1-01	Fermoy	Cork Athletic Grounds, Cork
