= 1909 Cork Senior Football Championship =

Gaelic football competition

- Champions: Macroom (1st title); Con O'Shea (captain)
- Runners-up: Bantry Blues; P. McCarthy (captain)

The 1909 Cork Senior Football Championship was the 23rd staging of the Cork Senior Football Championship since its establishment by the Cork County Board in 1887.

Lees entered the championship as the defending champions.

On 31 October 1909, Macroom won the championship following a 1–06 to 1–02 defeat of Bantry Blues in the final. This was their first championship title.

== Results ==
=== Final ===
31 October 1909 Final	Macroom	1-06 - 1-02	Bantry Blues	Cork Athletic Grounds

== Championship statistics ==
=== Miscellaneous ===
- Macroom win their first title.
- Bantry Blues qualify for the final for the first time.
