= 1911 All-Ireland Senior Football Championship =

Football championship

All-Ireland Champions
- Winning team: Cork (2nd win)
- Captain: Mick Mehigan

All-Ireland Finalists
- Losing team: Antrim
- Captain: H Sheehan

Provincial Champions
- Munster: Cork
- Leinster: Kilkenny
- Ulster: Antrim
- Connacht: Galway

Championship statistics

The 1911 All-Ireland Senior Football Championship was the 25th staging of Ireland's premier Gaelic football knock-out competition. In the Leinster Quarter final Dublin ended Louth's period as All Ireland champions. Cork were the winners, beating Antrim, the first Ulster team to make the final.

== Results ==
=== Connacht ===
Connacht Senior Football Championship

24 September 1911
Final

Galway	W – L	Mayo

Claremorris

=== Leinster ===
Leinster Senior Football Championship

1911
Quarter-Final

Kilkenny	3–0 – 0–1	Wexford

Waterford

16 July 1911
Quarter-Final

Meath	2–2 – 1–3	Laois

Jones Road, Dublin
Referee: Maurice Collins

9 July 1911
Preliminary Round

Louth	4–10 – 1–1	Offaly

16 July 1911
Quarter-Final

Kildare	2–6 – 1–3	Wicklow

Jones' Road, Dublin
Referee: MF Crowe (Dublin)

1911
Quarter-Final

Dublin	3–2 – 1–4	Louth

Navan

1911
Semi-Final

Meath	1–3 – 0–2	Dublin

Jones Road, Dublin

13 August 1911
Semi-Final

Kildare	1–3 – 0–3	Kilkenny

Portlaoise

22 October 1911
Final

Kilkenny	2–4 – 1–1	Meath
		Christy Commins 1–0

Jones' Road, Dublin

=== Munster ===
Munster Senior Football Championship

2 July 1911
Quarter-Final

Kerry	2–4 – 0–1	Limerick

Markets Field, Limerick

1911
Quarter-Final

Waterford	2–9 – 0–2	Clare

Tipperary

9 July 1911
Semi-Final

Cork	3–3 – 0–1	Tipperary

Kilmallock
Referee: J. O'Riordan (L)

27 August 1911
Semi-Final

Waterford	1–2 – 0–1	Kerry

Mallow

29 October 1911
Final

Cork	2–5 – 0–1	Waterford

Dungarvan

=== Ulster ===
Ulster Senior Football Championship

1911
Final

Antrim	2–8 – 0–4	Cavan

=== Semi-finals ===
3 December 1911
Semi-Final

Cork	3–4 – 0–2	Galway

Portlaoise

10 December 1911
Semi-Final

Antrim	3–1 – 1–1	Kilkenny

Jones' Road, Dublin

=== Final ===
14 January 1912
Final

Cork	6–6 – 1–2	Antrim

Jones' Road, Dublin
Attendance: 11,000
Referee: M O'Brennan (Roscommon)

== Statistics ==
=== Miscellaneous ===
- Cork win their second All Ireland title first since 1890.
- Antrim play in their first ever All Ireland final.
