= Collins GAA =

Collins
- Dún Uí Choileáin
- County: Cork

Senior Club Championships
| | All Ireland | Munster champions | Cork champions |
|---|---|---|---|
| Football: | 0 | 0 | 4 |
| Hurling: | 0 | 0 | 0 |

Collins Hurling and Football Club was a Gaelic Athletic Association club in Cork, Ireland. The club was affiliated to the Cork County Board and fielded teams in both hurling and Gaelic football.

== History ==
Located on the Old Youghal Road on the north side of Cork, Collins Hurling and Football Club was composed of military personnel who were based at Collins Barracks. The club claimed its first silverware when, in 1929, Collins were awarded the Cork SFC title after an objection to Macroom's victory in the final was upheld. The club continued to field teams in both hurling and Gaelic football sporadically over the course of the following decade.

The aftermath of the Emergency resulted in a resurgence of the club. Collins won three Cork JFC titles from three finals appearances between 1945 and 1948. These were followed by four senior final appearances between 1949 and 1953. After beating Macroom to win their first SFC title in 20 years in 1949, Collins claimed further titles in 1951 and 1953.

== Honours ==
- Cork Senior Football Championship (4): 1929, 1949, 1951, 1953
- Cork Junior Football Championship (2): 1945, 1948

== Notable players ==
- Miah Burke: All-Ireland SHC–winner (1928, 1929)
- Willie Donnelly: All-Ireland SHC–winner (1928, 1929)
- Bill Higgins: All-Ireland SHC–winner (1926)
- Maurice Murphy: All-Ireland SHC–winner (1926)
