= Macroom GAA =

Gaelic sports club in County Cork, Ireland

Macroom
- Máigh Chromtha
- Founded: 1882
- County: Cork
- Colours
- Grounds: Castle Grounds; Bishop McEgan Park; Tom Creedon Park
- Coordinates: 51°54′11.33″N 8°58′28.24″W

Playing kits
Standard colours

Senior Club Championships
	All Ireland	Munster champions	Cork champions
Football:	0	0	10

Macroom GAA is a Gaelic Athletic Association club located in Macroom, County Cork, Ireland. The club is affiliated to the Muskerry Board and the Cork County Board and is solely concerned with the game of Gaelic football.

== History ==
Located in the town of Macroom, about 25 miles west of Cork, Macroom Gaelic Football Club's foundation in 1882 predates the establishment of the Gaelic Athletic Association by two years. The club had its first success in 1907 when a defeat of Nils secured the Cork JFC title. This began a successful era which saw Macroom win four Cork SFC titles in five seasons between 1909 and 1913.

Macroom had another successful decade between 1925 and 1935, when the club won a further four Cork SFC titles from seven final appearances. A long fallow period followed, however, Macroom emerged in the late 1950s with a new team featuring players like Hugo Casey, Dan Murray, Mick Gould and Tim O'Callaghan. Macroom won their ninth Cork SFC in 1958, following a 1–07 to 0–09 defeat of Avondhu in the final. Four years later, the club claimed its 10th and final Cork SFC title following a 3–04 to 1–04 win over Muskerry.

The following decades saw Macroom have success in the lower grades. The club won Cork IFC titles in 1982 and 1990. Macroom claimed a third Cork IFC title in 2010, when a Fintan Goold-captained team beat Kildorrery by 1-09 to 0-10 in the final.

== Honours ==
- Cork Senior Football Championship (10): 1909, 1910, 1912, 1913, 1925, 1930, 1931, 1935, 1958, 1962
- Cork Intermediate Football Championship (3): 1982, 1990, 2010
- Cork Junior Football Championship (1): 1907
- Mid Cork Junior A Football Championship (5): 1926, 1934, 1942, 1945, 1991
- Cork Under-21 Football Championship (1): 1982
- Cork Minor Football Championship (8): 1928, 1929, 1930, 1935, 1946, 1948, 1949, 1986
- Cork Minor A Football Championship (3): 1992, 2004, 2024
- Cork Minor Premier 2 Football Championship (1) : 2026

== Inter-County Players ==
- Ned Casey: All-Ireland SFC-winner (1945)
- Colman Corrigan: All-Ireland SFC-winner (1989, 1990)
- Fintan Goold: All-Ireland SFC-winner (2010)
- Bill Lehane: All-Ireland SFC-winner (1911)
- Thade Murphy: All-Ireland SFC-winner (1911)
