= P. A. Murphy =

Irish Gaelic footballer (1918–1973)

Patrick A. Murphy
Personal information
- Native name: Pádraig A. Ó Murchú (Irish)
- Nickname: Weesh
- Born: 21 June 1918 Bere Island, County Cork, Ireland
- Died: 2 September 1973 (aged 55) Drumcondra, Dublin, Ireland
- Occupation: Veterinary surgeon
- Height: 6 ft 0 in (183 cm)

Sport
- Sport: Gaelic football
- Position: Full-back
Clubs
- Years: Club
- Bere Island; Beara; St Finbarr's; Lees
Club titles
- Cork titles: 2
Inter-county
Years	County	Apps (scores)
1942-1954	Cork	27 (0-00)
Inter-county titles
- Munster titles: 4
- All-Irelands: 1
- NFL: 1

Patrick Aloysius Murphy (21 June 1918 – 2 September 1973), known as Weesh Murphy, was an Irish Gaelic football player, selector and administrator. Throughout a club career that spanned over 20 years, he played for several clubs in Cork and Dublin and had championship success in different grades with Bere Island, Lees Football Club and divisional side Beara. At inter-county level, he was full-back on the Cork senior football team that won the 1945 All-Ireland Championship; he had earlier won the first of four Munster Championship medals and ended his career with a National League title. As well as club and county successes, Murphy was a regular for Munster over an eight-year period and won three Railway Cup medals. His inter-county career was followed by several periods as a team selector, while he also became involved in administrative affairs as chairman of the Cork County Board and the Munster Council.

Murphy is widely considered one of the best players of his generation, and among the greatest of all time, as well as being regarded by many in the sport as Cork's greatest ever full-back. A Cork Examiner obituary stated that he was a "powerfully built robust figure" and "one of the most consistently dependable footballers Cork has produced." Murphy was posthumously named in the full-back position on the Cork Team of the Century in 1984 and the Cork Team of the Millennium in 2000.

== Playing career ==
=== Club ===
Murphy first played Gaelic football with the Bere Island club that enjoyed much success by winning several Beara Junior Championship titles throughout the late 1930s and early 1940s. His performances at club level also saw him being selected for the Beara divisional team, with County Senior Championship success being achieved after a 2-08 to 1-07 win over Millstreet in the 1940 final. Murphy lined out in a junior decider defeat with Bere Island in 1941, before winning a County Junior Championship title two years later after a 5-04 to 1-03 defeat of Commercials.

During his studies in Dublin, Murphy lined out in the Dublin County Championship with the Veterinary College team. After they disbanded he briefly played with the Seán McDermotts club. After returning to Cork he continued to play with Bere Island before transferring to the St Finbarr's club in 1948. Three years later, Murphy and a number of other St Finbarr's players left the club and reorganised the almost defunct Lees Football Club. After just four year the newly formed club qualified for the 1955 final, with Murphy collecting his second County Senior Championship medal after lining out at full-forward in the 2-04 to 0-09 win over Macroom.

Murphy had been elected to the Cork County Board when his club career came to a sudden end after suffering a broken collarbone when lining out in goal in the 1957 final defeat by St Finbarr's.

=== Inter-county ===
Murphy first appeared on the inter-county scene when he was drafted onto the Cork junior team at left wing-back for the 1940 Munster final. He ended the game with a winners' medal after the 1-06 to 0-03 win over Tipperary. Murphy made his Cork senior team debut as midfield partner to Éamonn Young in the 1942 Munster final defeat by Kerry.

After lining out at full-back in Cork's 1943 Munster semi-final draw with Kerry, Murphy was unavailable for the rest of the provincial campaign which saw Cork claim the title for the first time in 15 years after a three-point win over Tipperary. After returning to the starting fifteen for the All-Ireland semi-final defeat by Cavan, he went on to establish himself as Cork's first-choice full-back by the time the team qualified for the 1945 Munster final. The 1-11 to 1-06 defeat of Kerry gave Murphy his first provincial winners' medal on the field of play. The death of his brother resulted in Murphy withdrawing from the team for the All-Ireland semi-final defeat of Galway, however, he reclaimed the full-back berth for the All-Ireland final against Cavan. The Cork defence came in for particular praise in rendering Cavan goalless over the hour, with Murphy claiming an All-Ireland winners' medal after the 2-05 to 0-07 win. His brother, Brendan Murphy, was a substitute on the team.

After surrendering their provincial and national titles at the first attempt in 1946, Cork lost consecutive Munster finals to Kerry over the following two years. Murphy won his third Munster Championship medal after a 3-06 to 0-07 defeat of Clare in the 1949 final. Back-to-back Munster final defeats followed, however, Murphy claimed his second national silverware when Cork claimed the 1951-52 league title after defeats of Dublin and New York in the finals. He later claimed his fourth provincial winners' medal after an 0-11 to 0-02 defeat of Kerry in the 1952 Munster final. Murphy was now in the twilight of his inter-county career and his last game was a 4-09 to 2-03 defeat by Kerry in the 1954 Munster final.

=== Inter-provincial ===
Murphy was first selected for the Munster inter-provincial team in advance of the 1944 Railway Cup, in what was the first of eight successive years with the team. After defeats in his first two years with the team, he claimed his first Railway Cup medal in 1946 as part of an all-Cork full-back line. Murphy won two more inter-provincial titles in 1948 and 1949 after respective defeats of Ulster and Leinster in the finals.

== Administration career ==
Murphy was nominated by the Lees club for the position of chairman of the County Board and was duly elected at the County Convention on 22 January 1956 after defeating the incumbent, Andy Scannell, by 123 votes to 100. During the course of his tenure, Cork's hurling and football teams went into somewhat of a decline and failed to win a singe All-Ireland title at senior level. Off the field, it was during Murphy's chairmanship that the county board investigated the prospect of building a new stadium to replace the Cork Athletic Grounds. In 1963 the county board bought some land at Model Farm Road, on the western side of the city, as the site for a new development. It was envisaged that this new stadium would hold up to 70,000 spectators and provide more modern facilities. Murphy's tenure as chairman ended at the 1966 County Convention when Jack Barrett was elected in his place. He continued to work with the county board as Central Council delegate. In March 1971, Murphy was elected unopposed to the position of chairman of the Munster Council. He was also, in effect, one of the four Vice-Presidents of the Association.

== Personal life ==
Patrick Aloysius Murphy was born on Bere Island on 21 June 1918, the fifth child and third son born to Patrick and Sarah Murphy (née Lyons). His two older brothers, John Joe and Cornelius Murphy, joined the priesthood, with the former rising to the position of Dean of the Diocese of Kerry and the latter dying from fever as a young missionary in Nigeria. Murphy was educated locally and later boarded at St Brendan's College in Killarney. He completed his studies at the Veterinary College in Dublin before practising as a veterinary surgeon in Cork. Murphy later worked as general manager of the Southwestern Cattle Breeding Station in Bandon, County Cork and was also veterinary officer at Cork Greyhound Stadium.

Murphy married Annetta Mary "Anna" Connolly from Dromore West, County Sligo at a ceremony in Dublin in 1947. The couple later settled in Cork and had five children. Their son, Con Murphy, spent over 40 years as team doctor to the Cork senior hurling and football teams.

== Death ==
In his official capacity as Chairman of the Munster Council, Murphy attended the All-Ireland final between Limerick and Kilkenny on 2 September 1973. He was taken ill during the game but remained to watch the final stages in the company of his son, a medical doctor. Murphy died later that evening.

== Honours ==
=== Player ===
Bere Island

- Cork Junior Football Championship: 1943
- Beara Junior Football Championship: 1936, 1939, 1941, 1942

Lees

- Cork Senior Football Championship: 1955

Beara

- Cork Senior Football Championship: 1940

Cork

- All-Ireland Senior Football Championship: 1945
- Munster Senior Football Championship: 1943, 1945, 1949, 1952
- National Football League: 1951-52
- Munster Junior Football Championship: 1940

Munster

- Railway Cup: 1946, 1948, 1949

=== Selector ===
Cork

- Munster Senior Football Championship: 1956, 1957, 1966, 1967
- National Football League: 1955-56
- All-Ireland Junior Football Championship: 1951
- Munster Junior Football Championship: 1951

Sporting positions
Preceded by Andy Scannell	Chairman of the Cork County Board; 1956-1966	Succeeded by Jack Barrett
Preceded by Paddy Ryan	Chairman of the Munster Council; 1971-1973	Succeeded by Nioclás Mac Craith
