= 1945 All-Ireland Senior Football Championship final =

- Event: 1945 All-Ireland Senior Football Championship
Cork	Cavan
2-5 (11)	0-7 (7)
- Date: 23 September 1945
- Venue: Croke Park, Dublin
- Referee: John Dunne (Galway)
- Attendance: 67,329

The 1945 All-Ireland Senior Football Championship final was a Gaelic football match played at Croke Park on 23 September 1945 to determine the winners of the 1945 All-Ireland Senior Football Championship, the 59th season of the All-Ireland Senior Football Championship, a tournament organised by the Gaelic Athletic Association for the champions of the four provinces of Ireland. The final was contested by Cork of Munster and Cavan of Ulster, with Cork winning by 2–5 to 0–7.

In what was only the second ever championship meeting between the two sides, Cork were regarded as outsiders against a Cavan side who had dominated their province for over a decade without adding an All-Ireland title. The Breffni Men, who had the advantage of the elements in the first half, got the opening score when T. P. O'Reilly pointed after five minutes. The advantage turned in Cork's favour three minutes later when Éamonn Young and Derry Beckett combined to put Mick Tubridy in for a goal. Cavan quickly equalized before Derry Beckett scored a point from a free. Further points from Tubridy (two) and Humphrey O'Neill in response to two from P. J. Duke and Tony Tighe left Cork in the lead by 1–4 to 0–5 at the interval.

Derry Beckett, from a narrow angle, increased Cork's lead shortly after resuming before Cavan, again aided by the elements as the wind had changed, got a grip on the exchanges. The Cork defence held strong under twenty minutes of intense pressure from the Cavan forwards, and limited the northerners to two points from Peter Donohoe and Joe Stafford. After moving to midfield Jack Lynch lifted the siege and set up a quick move involving Tubridy and Young which created an opportunity for Derry Beckett to score the clinching goal.

Cork's All-Ireland victory was their first since 1911. The win gave them their third All-Ireland title over all and put them joint sixth on the all-time roll of honour along with Galway.

Cavan's All-Ireland defeat was their second in three years and their third in succession since winning their last championship decider in 1935.

For some Cork players there was a happy symmetry with Cork's last All-Ireland victory. Éamonn Young's father, Jack, and Derry Beckett's father, Jerry, had won All-Ireland medals as members of the Cork team in 1911. Beckett also joined an elite list of dual player's who had won All-Ireland medals in both football and hurling. He had previously won an All-Ireland medal with the Cork hurling team in 1942. Paddy "Hitler" Healy also joined this elite group, winning an All-Ireland medal as a substitute to supplement the winners' medal he claimed on the field of play with the Cork hurlers in 1944.

Cork's Jack Lynch also became a dual All-Ireland medallist, however, his achievement was the most spectacular of all. He had won four successive All-Ireland medals with the Cork senior hurling team between 1941 and 1944. In joining in the footballers success Lynch became the first player to win five All-Ireland medals in succession.

The annexing of the All-Ireland title was also a major triumph for the Clonakilty club in West Cork as they provided no fewer than eight players to the Cork panel.

== Match ==
=== Details ===
23 September 1945
15:15 IST

Cork	2-5 - 0-7	Cavan
D Beckett (1-2); M Tubridy (1-1); H O'Neill (0-1); J Lynch (0-1).		J Stafford (0-4); TP O'Reilly (0-2); T Tighe (0-1).

Croke Park, Dublin
Attendance: 67,329
Referee: John Dunne (Galway)

Cork	Cavan

GK	1	Moll O'Driscoll
RCB	2	Dave Magnier
FB	3	P. A. Murphy
LCB	4	Caleb Crone
RWB	5	Paddy Cronin
CB	6	Tadhgo Crowley (c)
LWB	7	Denis Connors
M	8	Éamonn Young
M	9	Fachtna O'Donovan
RWF	10	Ned Casey (substituted off) ?'
CF	11	Humphrey O'Neill
LWF	12	Mick Tubridy
RCF	13	Jack Lynch
FF	14	Jim Cronin
LCF	15	Derry Beckett
Substitutes:
	16	Seán Kavanagh
	17	Brendan Murphy
	18	Seán Linehan
	19	Mick Finn
	20	Dessie Cullinane
	21	Paddy Healy
RWF	22	Jim Ahern (substituted in) ?'
	23	Tadhg O'Driscoll
	24	Paddy O'Grady

GK	1	Brendan Kelly
RCB	2	Tom O'Reilly (c)
FB	3	Barney Cully
LCB	4	Peter Paul Galligan
RWB	5	John Wilson
CB	6	John Joe O'Reilly
LWB	7	Paddy Smith
M	8	Tony Tighe
M	9	Simon Deignan
RWF	10	A. Commiskey
CF	11	Jack Boylan
LWF	12	T. P. O'Reilly
RCF	13	Joe Stafford
FF	14	Peter Donohoe
LCF	15	P. J. Duke

MATCH RULES

- 60 minutes.
- Replay if scores level.
