= Tadhgo Crowley =

Irish Gaelic footballer

Personal information
- Native name: Tadhg Ó Cruadhlaoich (Irish)
- Nickname: Tadhgo
- Born: 24 April 1921 Clonakilty, County Cork, Ireland
- Died: 4 December 1963 (aged 42) Clonakilty, County Cork, Ireland
- Occupation: Van driver
- Height: 6 ft 1 in (185 cm)

Sport
- Sport: Gaelic football
- Position: Centre-back
Club
- Years: Club
- 1939–1957: Clonakilty
Club titles
- Cork titles: 7
Inter-county
Years	County	Apps (scores)
1943–1949	Cork	15 (0–03)
Inter-county titles
- Munster titles: 3
- All-Irelands: 1
- NFL: 0

Timothy J. Crowley (24 April 1921 – 3 December 1963), also known as Tadhgo Crowley, was an Irish Gaelic football player and referee. Throughout his 18-year club career, he played for his hometown club Clonakilty, winning seven County Championship titles during a golden age for the club; he also played hurling for 'Clon', and had much success in the West Cork Championship. At inter-county level, he captained the Cork county team to the 1945 All-Ireland Championship title; he had earlier won an All-Ireland title as a member of the Cork minor hurling team in 1939. As well as being a successful captain for club and county, Crowley led Munster to win two Railway Cups: in 1946 as captain, and in 1948. Towards the end of his career, he served as a referee at club and inter-county levels.

Crowley is widely considered one of the best players of his generation, and among the greatest of all time, as well as being regarded by many in the sport as Cork's greatest ever centre-back. A Cork Examiner obituary stated that his "high fetching, fearlessness, long kicking and clever anticipation put him in a class apart." Crowley is the youngest of Cork's seven All-Ireland-winning captains and was the first of those to accept the Sam Maguire Cup. He was posthumously named in the centre-back position on the Cork Team of the Century in 1984 and the Cork Team of the Millennium in 2000.

== Playing career ==
=== Clonakilty ===
Crowley joined the Clonakilty club at a young age and was just out of the minor grade when he was added to the club's senior team. His debut championship season culminated with him lining out as midfield partner to Mick Finn in the 1939 county final. Crowley was described in newspaper reports as being one of the more "prominent" Clonakilty players, and he ended the game with his first winners' medal after a 0-07 to 0-05 win over Beara.

Crowley had just turned 21 years old when he was appointed club captain and it was in that role that he guided Clonakilty to the 1942 county final against arch rivals of the time Fermoy. The 1-08 to 1-05 victory gave him a second county championship medal. It was the first of three successive defeats of Fermoy in finals, with Crowley acting as captain on each occasion.

Crowley handed the team captaincy to Dessie Cullinane for the 1945 championship. However, four-in-a-row proved beyond Clonakilty after a defeat by Fermoy. Both sides clashed for the fifth consecutive year in the 1946 county final. Crowley, who was described in the Evening Echo as being the match winner, secured a fifth championship title after the 1-02 to 0-03 victory. Clonakilty qualified for a sixth successive county final the following year, with Crowley collecting a sixth winners' medal after the 2-05 to 1-04 win over St. Nicholas'.

After appearing in six successive county finals, Clonakilty's form took a dip and it was the 1952 decider when they next appeared. The 31-year-old Crowley was now regarded as a veteran of the team and had been switched from centre-back to the full-back line. However, he claimed a seventh championship medal after the 1-04 to 0-04 win over reigning champions Collins. This was his last big occasion with Clonakilty. After missing the 1954 county final defeat by St. Nicholas', Crowley retired from club football after Clonakilty's exit from the 1957 championship.

=== Cork ===
Crowley first appeared on the inter-county scene as a member of the Cork minor hurling team during the 1939 Munster Minor Championship. After scoring two goals on his debut in the semi-final win over Limerick, he was switched to midfield for the 8-03 to 0-2 win over Clare in the final. Crowley retained the midfield berth for the rest of the championship and claimed an All-Ireland medal as partner to Éamonn Young in the 5-02 to 2-02 defeat of Kilkenny in the final.

Success with Clonakilty at club level resulted in Crowley being selected for the Cork senior football team for the 1943 Munster Championship, while he also took over the captaincy of the team. After making his debut in a 2-03 to 0-09 draw with Kerry, he later guided Cork to their first Munster Championship title since 1928 after a 1-07 to 1-04 defeat of Tipperary in the final.

After being dropped from the team the following year, Crowley earned a recall in 1945 while once again taking over the captaincy. He also took up the centre-back position and it was from here that he guided Cork to a second Munster Championship title in three years after a 1-11 to 1-06 defeat of Kerry in the final. After giving what has been described as his best performance in the All-Ireland semi-final against Galway, Crowley subsequently captained Cork to their first All-Ireland Championship in 34 years after a 2-05 to 0-07 win over Cavan in the 1945 All-Ireland final. He was Cork's third All-Ireland-winning captain and the first to receive the Sam Maguire Cup.

Cork surrendered their All-Ireland title at the first hurdle with a defeat by Kerry in the 1946 Munster Championship, before losing back-to-back provincial finals to the same opposition over the following two years. Crowley was switched to the left corner-back position for the 1949 Munster Championship and claimed a third winners' medal after a 3-06 to 0-07 win over Clare in the final. The subsequent All-Ireland semi-final defeat by Cavan was Crowley's last championship game for Cork.

=== Munster ===
Crowley's performances for Cork in 1943 earned a call-up to the Munster team for the 1944 Railway Cup. After being omitted from the team the following year, he was once again selected in 1946 and captained the team to a 3-05 to 1-09 defeat of Leinster. The provincial team surrendered their title to Ulster. However, Crowley claimed his second Railway Cup title in 1948 after a 4-05 to 2-06 win over Ulster in the final.

== Personal life and death ==
Crowley was born in Clonakilty, West Cork, the youngest of eight children born to John and Julia Crowley (née Twohig). After his education he worked as a van driver. Crowley married Sheila Crowley and they had two sons.

Crowley died at his home in Clonakilty on 3 December 1963, after suffering a stroke while attending the weekly meeting of the Clonakilty Coursing Club. At just 42-years-old he was the third member of the 1945 All-Ireland-winning team to die.

== Honours ==
Clonakilty

- Cork Senior Football Championship: 1939, 1942 (c), 1943 (c), 1944 (c), 1946, 1947, 1952

Cork

- All-Ireland Senior Football Championship: 1945 (c)
- Munster Senior Football Championship: 1943 (c), 1945 (c), 1949
- All-Ireland Minor Hurling Championship: 1939
- Munster Minor Hurling Championship: 1939

Munster

- Railway Cup: 1946 (c), 1948

Sporting positions
Preceded by	Cork Senior Football Captain; 1943	Succeeded by Mick Finn
Preceded by Dessie Cullinane	Cork Senior Football Captain; 1945	Succeeded by Dave Magnier
Achievements
Preceded by Jimmy Murray	All-Ireland SFC winning captain 1945	Succeeded by Paddy Kennedy
Preceded by Peeny Whelan	Railway Cup Football Final winning captain 1946	Succeeded by Kevin Armstrong
