= 1942 All-Ireland Senior Football Championship final =

- Event: 1942 All-Ireland Senior Football Championship
Dublin	Galway
1–10 (13)	1–8 (11)
- Date: 20 September 1942
- Venue: Croke Park, Dublin
- Referee: Sean Kennedy (Donegal)
- Attendance: 37,105

The 1942 All-Ireland Senior Football Championship final was the 55th All-Ireland Final and the deciding match of the 1942 All-Ireland Senior Football Championship, an inter-county Gaelic football tournament for the top teams in Ireland.

== Match ==
This year's final was played on 20 September.

=== Summary ===
Paddy O'Connor goaled for Dublin in the 10th minute, and five late points gave them a narrow victory, their first title in nineteen years. Bobby Beggs of the Dublin team beat his former team of Galway, having won an All-Ireland medal with them in 1938 and being on the Dublin team losing to Galway in the 1934 final.

Dublin's first All-Ireland football title since 1923, brought to an end a 19-year barren spell for the county, rivalled only by their team of the late 1990s and 2000s.

This was the third of three consecutive All-Ireland football finals lost by Galway, following defeats to Kerry at the final hurdle in 1940 and 1941.

With their 1940 win, Kerry had reached 14 All-Ireland titles, drawing level with Dublin. Dublin had been in the lead since 1892. In 1941, Kerry would take the lead; Dublin's 1942 win equalled the new total, but never again did Dublin manage to surpass Kerry's total.

=== Details ===
20 September 1942
Final*

Dublin	1-10 – 1-8	Galway
T. Banks (0-6), P. O'Connor (1-1), J. Joy (0-2) & M. Fletcher (0-1).		S. Thronaton (0-4), J. Casey (1-0), M. Fallon (0-2) P. Thornton & J. Flavin (0-1).

Croke Park, Dublin
Attendance: 37,105
Referee: Sean Kennedy (Donegal)

|* = Note the same score was repeated in 1983.|

==== Dublin ====
- 1 Charlie Kelly
- 2 Bobby Beggs
- 3 Paddy Kennedy
- 4 Caleb Crone
- 5 Paddy Henry
- 6 Peter O'Reilly
- 7 Brendan Quinn
- 8 Mick Falvey
- 9 Joe Fitzgerald (c)
- 10 Jimmy Joy
- 11 Paddy Bermingham
- 12 Gerry Fitzgerald
- 13 Matt Fletcher
- 14 Paddy O'Connor
- 15 Tommy Banks

Substitutes
16 P. Ryan
17 Jack Murphy
18 S. Healy
19 S. Moriarty
20 M. Richardson
