= Paddy O'Grady =

Irish Gaelic footballer

Personal information
- Native name: Pádraig Ó Gráda (Irish)
- Nickname: Hawker
- Born: 1921 Fermoy, County Cork, Ireland
- Died: 14 June 1993 (aged 72) Fermoy, County Cork, Ireland
- Occupation: Motor trade employee

Sport
- Sport: Gaelic football
- Position: Left corner-forward
Club
- Years: Club
- Fermoy
Club titles
- Cork titles: 1
Inter-county
Years	County	Apps (scores)
1943-1946	Cork	1 (0-00)
Inter-county titles
- Munster titles: 2
- All-Irelands: 1
- NFL: 0

Peter John O'Grady (1921 – 14 June 1993) was an Irish Gaelic footballer who played for club side Fermoy and at inter-county level with the Cork senior football team.

== Playing career ==
After beginning his Gaelic football career at school's level with the local CBS, O'Grady was a part of the Fermoy minor team that won the County Championship in 1938. As a result, he captained the Cork minor team to their very first Munster Minor Championship success in 1939. O'Grady subsequently established himself on the Fermoy senior team and won a County Championship medal in 1945. He had earlier claimed a junior championship title as a hurler with Oldcastletown. After first lining out for Cork as a member of the junior team, O'Gardy was a substitute on the senior team that won the Munster Championship in 1943. He won a second provincial title from the bench in 1945, before ending the season by again lining out as a substitute when Cork claimed the All-Ireland title after a defeat of Cavan in the final.

== Personal life and death ==
O'Grady was associated with the motor trade all his life, beginning with Cavanagh's of Fermoy and finishing his career with Pope's Garage in Cork. He died on 14 June 1993.

== Honours ==
Oldcastletown

- Cork Junior Hurling Championship: 1943

Fermoy

- Cork Senior Football Championship: 1945

Cork

- All-Ireland Senior Football Championship: 1945
- Munster Senior Football Championship: 1943, 1945
- Munster Minor Football Championship: 1939 (c)
