= 1938 All-Ireland Senior Football Championship final =

- Event: 1938 All-Ireland Senior Football Championship
Galway	Kerry
3–3 (12)	2–6 (12)
- Date: 25 September 1938
- Venue: Croke Park, Dublin
- Referee: P Maguire (Cavan)
- Attendance: 68,950

1938 All-Ireland Senior Football Championship final replay
Galway	Kerry
2–4 (10)	0–7 (7)
- Date: 23 October 1938
- Venue: Croke Park, Dublin
- Referee: Peter Waters (Kildare)
- Attendance: 47,851

The 1938 All-Ireland Senior Football Championship final was the 51st All-Ireland Final and the deciding match of the 1938 All-Ireland Senior Football Championship, an inter-county Gaelic football tournament for the top teams in Ireland.

== Matches ==
This year's final was played on 25 September, with the replay following on 23 October.

=== Summary ===
Kerry supporters complained that the final whistle had gone too early in the first match, disallowing a late John Joe Landers winner. When the replay ended before Kerry could take a free which could have given an equalising goal, angry fans invaded the pitch. A loudspeaker appeal allowed the game to continue, and Galway won anyway.

Bobby Beggs lined out for the winning Galway team that day; he had earlier been on the Dublin side defeated by Galway in the final of 1934.

=== Details ===
25 September 1938; Final	Galway	3–3 – 2–6	Kerry	Croke Park, Dublin; Attendance: 68,950; Referee: P Maguire (Cavan)
25 September 1938; Final	B. Nestor (1-1), N. Mulholland & R. Griffin (1-0), J. Flavin & M. Kelly (0-1) each.		Seán Brosnan (0–1), Paddy Kennedy (0–1), Tony McAuliffe (0–1), John Joe Landers (1–0), Miko Doyle (0–2) & Tim O'Leary (1–1)	Croke Park, Dublin; Attendance: 68,950; Referee: P Maguire (Cavan)

23 October 1938; Final replay	Galway	2–4 – 0–7	Kerry	Croke Park, Dublin; Attendance: 47,851; Referee: Peter Waters (Kildare)
23 October 1938; Final replay	B. Nestor (0-4), R. Griffin & J. Burke (0-2) each.		Seán Brosnan (0–3), Charlie O'Sullivan (0–1), Miko Doyle (0–3)	Croke Park, Dublin; Attendance: 47,851; Referee: Peter Waters (Kildare)

Galway
Kerry

Galway (is this the replay or the drawn game?) =

- 1 Jimmy McGauran
- 2 Mick Raftery
- 3 M. Connaire
- 4 Dinny O'Sullivan
- 5 Frank Cunniffe
- 6 Bobby Beggs
- 7 Charlie Connolly
- 8 John Burke
- 9 John Dunne (c)
- 10 Jackie Flavin
- 11 Mick Higgins
- 12 R. Griffin
- 13 Ned Mulholland
- 14 M. Kelly
- 15 Brendan Nestor

Subs used
M. Ryder for Mulholland
P. McDonagh for Burke
