= Brendan Nestor =

Irish Gaelic footballer

Personal information
- Native name: Breandán Mac an Adhastair (Irish)
- Born: Thomas Brendan Nestor; 28 April 1911 Dunmore, County Galway, Ireland
- Died: 8 February 1981 (aged 69) Newcastle Road, Galway, Ireland
- Occupation: National school teacher
- Height: 6 ft 0 in (183 cm)

Sport
- Sport: Gaelic football
- Position: Left corner-forward
Clubs
- Years: Club
- Dunmore MacHales; Erin's Hope
Club titles
- Dublin titles: 1
Inter-county
- Years: County
- 1932-1941: Galway
Inter-county titles
- Connacht titles: 5
- All-Irelands: 2
- NFL: 1

Thomas Brendan Nestor (29 April 1911 – 8 February 1981) is an Irish former Gaelic footballer who played at club level with Dunmore MacHales and Erin's Hope and at inter-county level with the Galway senior football team. He usually lined out as a forward.

== Playing career ==
Nestor began his playing career with the Dunmore MacHales club. As a student at St Patrick's College, he also lined out with the Erin's Hope club and won a Dublin SFC title in 1932. Nestor had, by this stage, made an impression on the inter-county scene as a member of the Galway junior football team that won the All-Ireland Junior Championship title in 1931. He was promoted to the senior team and won All-Ireland Championship medals in 1934 and 1938. Nestor's other honours with Galway include five Connacht Championship medals and a National Football League title. He was also the first player from Connacht to win four Railway Cup medals.

== Post-playing career ==
In retirement from playing, Nestor became involved in team management and the administrative affairs of the GAA. He served as chairman of the Galway Football Board, held numerous positions with the Galway County Board, was chairman of the Connacht Council on two occasions and also held the position of President of the Connacht Council. Nestor was also a selector with the Galway senior football team that won three successive All-Ireland Championship titles from 1964 to 1966.

== Personal life and death ==
Nestor was the son of J. J. Nestor, the first chairman of the Galway County Board. He worked as a national school teacher, eventually rising to the position of principal. Nestor died at Galway Regional Hospital after a period of ill health on 8 February 1981. He was posthumously named on the Galway Football Team of the Millennium.

== Honours ==
=== Player ===
Erin's Hope

- Dublin Senior Football Championship: 1932

Galway

- All-Ireland Senior Football Championship: 1934, 1938
- Connacht Senior Football Championship: 1933, 1934, 1938, 1940, 1941
- National Football League: 1939–40
- All-Ireland Junior Football Championship: 1931
- Connacht Junior Football Championship: 1931

Connacht

- Railway Cup: 1934, 1936, 1937, 1938

=== Selector ===
Galway

- All-Ireland Senior Football Championship: 1964, 1965, 1966
- Connacht Senior Football Championship: 1964, 1965, 1966
- National Football League: 1964–65
