= 1934 All-Ireland Senior Football Championship final =

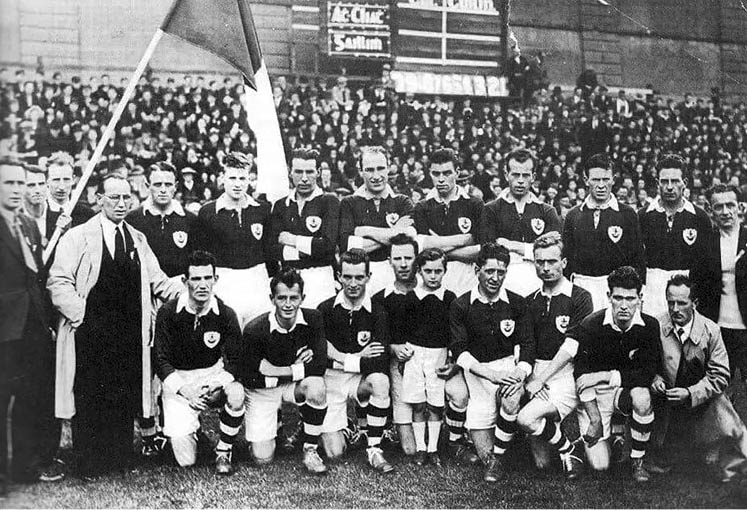
- Team of Galway, champions
- Event: 1934 All-Ireland Senior Football Championship
Galway	Dublin
3–5 (14)	1–9 (12)
- Date: 23 September 1934
- Venue: Croke Park, Dublin
- Referee: Sean McCarthy (Kerry)
- Attendance: 36,143
- Weather: Dry and fine

The 1934 All-Ireland Senior Football Championship final was the 47th All-Ireland Final and the deciding match of the 1934 All-Ireland Senior Football Championship, an inter-county Gaelic football tournament for the top teams in Ireland.

== Paths to the final ==
Dublin easily defeated Kerry in the All-Ireland SFC semi-final, held in 1934 in Tralee.

== Match ==
This year's final was played on 23 September.

=== Summary ===
A crowd of 36,143 attended the match. Galway had a two-point win over Dublin, with goals by the Kerry-born Michael Ferriter (2) and Martin Kelly.

The winning Galway team was the first to wear the now famous maroon and white colours of the county.

Bobby Beggs played for the losing Dublin team that day; he would line out for the winning Galway team in 1938.

This was Galway's second All-Ireland SFC title (the first was in 1925), and the first time the Sam Maguire Cup went west, since it had first been presented to the winning team in 1928.

=== Details ===
23 September 1934
Final

Galway	3–5 – 1–9	Dublin

Croke Park, Dublin
Attendance: 36,143
Referee: Sean McCarthy (Kerry)

Galway
Dublin

==== Galway ====
- M. Higgins (c)
- M. Brennan
- P. J. McDonnell
- M. Ferriter
- H. Carey
- D. O'Sullivan
- T. Hughes
- T. McCarthy
- F. Fox
- J. Dunne
- M. Connaire
- R. Griffin
- M. Kelly
- D. Mitchell
- B. Nestor

== Post-match ==
The winning team went to New York to play some games for the Americans there.

A photograph exists showing the 1934 All-Ireland SFC title winning team aboard the ship on their way across the Atlantic to America.

The captain was Mick Higgins. Also included are Mick Ferriter, Frank Fox, Dinny Sullivan, Tadg McCarthy, Fr Brune, masseur Toddy Ryan, County Board secretary Martin Regan, Mick Connaire, Brendan Nestor, Frank Burke, goalkeeper Michael Brennan, Joe Kelleher, Paddy Stephens, Ralph Griffin, John Dunne, Dermot Mitchell, Hugo Carey, Pat McDonnell, Tommy Hughes, trainer Tom Molloy, Fr Eugene McLoughlin, and various others whose identities are unknown.
