= Bobby Beggs =

Irish Gaelic footballer

Personal information
- Native name: Riobeard Ó Beig (Irish)
- Born: 25 February 1911 Skerries, County Dublin, Ireland
- Died: 7 May 1993 (aged 82) Beaumont, Dublin, Ireland
- Occupation: Fisherman

Sport
- Sport: Gaelic football
- Position: Centre-back
Clubs
- Years: Club
- Skerries Harps; Wolfe Tones
Club titles
- Galway titles: 2
Inter-county
- Years: County
- 1934; 1942 1935-1941: Dublin; Galway
Inter-county titles
- Connacht titles: 3
- Leinster titles: 2
- All-Irelands: 2
- NFL: 1

Robert Beggs (25 February 1911 – 7 May 1993) was an Irish Gaelic footballer who played for club sides Skerries Harps and Wolfe Tones and at inter-county level with the Dublin and Galway senior football teams.

== Career ==
Beggs first came to prominence as a Gaelic footballer on the Dublin senior team that lost the 1934 All-Ireland final to Galway. A short time after this defeat, he took up employment in Galway and transferred his football allegiance. Beggs's seven seasons with the Galway senior team yielded a National League title, three Connacht Championship medals and All-Ireland success after a defeat of Kerry in the 1938 final. He also enjoyed club success with the Wolfe Tones club and won two County Championship titles. After returning to Dublin, Beggs once again lined out with his native county and claimed a second All-Ireland winners' medal in 1942 at the expense of his former team. He also secured Railway Cup medals with both Leinster and Connacht.

== Personal life and death ==
Born in Skerries, County Dublin, Beggs spent his entire adult life working as a fisherman in his hometown and later in Claddagh, County Galway after moving for work before returning to Skerries. His Galway-born son, Brian Beggs, won an All-Ireland Minor Championship title with Dublin in 1958. Beggs died in Beaumont Hospital on 7 May 1993 after suffering a stroke.

== Honours ==
Wolfe Tones

- Galway Senior Football Championship: 1936, 1941

Skerries Harps

- Dublin Junior Football Championship: 1943

Galway

- All-Ireland Senior Football Championship: 1938
- Connacht Senior Football Championship: 1938, 1940, 1941
- National Football League: 1939-40

Dublin

- All-Ireland Senior Football Championship: 1942
- Leinster Senior Football Championship: 1934, 1942

Leinster

- Railway Cup: 1935

Connacht

- Railway Cup: 1936, 1937
