= Tadhg O'Driscoll =

Irish Gaelic footballer

Personal information
- Native name: Tadhg Ó Drisceoil (Irish)
- Born: 3 December 1919 Ballycotton, County Cork, Ireland
- Died: 16 February 1986 (aged 66) Ballycotton, County Cork, Ireland
- Occupation: Publican

Sport
- Sport: Gaelic football
- Position: Centre-forward
Club
- Years: Club
- Fermoy
Club titles
- Cork titles: 1
Inter-county
Years	County	Apps (scores)
1945-1949	Cork	2 (0-02)
Inter-county titles
- Munster titles: 2
- All-Irelands: 1
- NFL: 0

Timothy O'Driscoll (3 December 1919 – 16 February 1986), known as Tadhg O'Driscoll was an Irish Gaelic footballer who played for club side Fermoy and at senior level with the Cork county team.

== Playing career ==
O'Driscoll first came to prominence as a Gaelic footballer with the Fermoy team that played in five consecutive county finals in the 1940s. The club succeeded in securing the title in 1945. By that stage O'Driscoll had already gained inter-county experience. He first lined out for the Cork senior football team in 1937, before claiming a Munster Championship title with the juniors n 1940. He was back with the Cork senior team in 1945 and was at centre-forward when they claimed that year's Munster Championship. A hand injury necessitated the amputation of one of O'Driscoll's fingers, a procedure which resulted in him losing his place on the starting fifteen. In spite of this, he was listed amongst the substitutes when Cork claimed the All-Ireland title after a defeat of Cavan in the final. O'Driscoll won a second Munster Championship with the Cork seniors shortly before his retirement from the inter-county game in 1949.

== Personal life and death ==
Born in Ballycotton, County Cork, O'Driscoll was the eldest of four brothers who all won County Championship honours with four different clubs. His brother, Paddy O'Driscoll, also played for Cork and went on to become chairman of the Cork County Board. O'Driscoll spent the majority of his working life as a publican. He died in Ballycotton on 16 February 1986.

== Honours ==
Fermoy

- Cork Senior Football Championship: 1945

Cork

- All-Ireland Senior Football Championship: 1945
- Munster Senior Football Championship: 1945, 1949
- Munster Junior Football Championship: 1940
