= Brendan Quinn (Gaelic football trainer) =

Irish Gaelic footballer (1919–1989)

Personal information
- Native name: Breandán Ó Cuinn (Irish)
- Born: 30 August 1919 Sandymount, Dublin, Ireland
- Died: 13 March 1989 (aged 69) Donnycarney, Dublin, Ireland
- Occupation: Teacher

Sport
- Sport: Gaelic football
- Position: Left wing-back
Club
- Years: Club
- Parnells
Club titles
- Dublin titles: 2
Inter-county
- Years: County
- 1941-1942: Dublin
Inter-county titles
- Leinster titles: 2
- All-Irelands: 1
- NFL: 0

Brendan Quinn (30 August 1919 – 13 March 1989) was an Irish Gaelic football player and trainer who played for club side Parnells and at inter-county level with the Dublin senior football team.

== Career ==
Quinn first came to Gaelic football prominence as a member of the Parnells club that won the County Championship in 1939. He claimed a second winners' medal in 1945. The first victory resulted in Quinn's inclusion on the Dublin senior football team in 1941, and he won his first Leinster Championship medal that year. He won a second successive provincial title in 1942, however, the highlight of his brief inter-county career was the 1942 All-Ireland final defeat of Galway. Quinn later trained the Dublin senior team to the 1963 All-Ireland Championship title.

== Personal life and death ==
Quinn was born in Dublin and spent his entire working life at the School of Printing in Bolton Street College. He died after a brief illness on 13 March 1989.

== Honours ==
Geraldines

- Dublin Senior Football Championship: 1939, 1945

Dublin

- All-Ireland Senior Football Championship: 1942
- Leinster Senior Football Championship: 1941, 1942
