= Dave Magnier =

Irish Gaelic footballer

Personal information
- Native name: Daithí Maignéir (Irish)
- Born: 30 October 1915 Fermoy, County Cork, Ireland
- Died: 10 July 1979 (aged 63) Wilton, Cork, Ireland
- Occupation: Carpenter
- Height: 6 ft 0 in (183 cm)

Sport
- Sport: Gaelic football
- Position: Right corner-back
Club
- Years: Club
- Fermoy
Club titles
- Cork titles: 1
Inter-county
| Years | County | Apps (scores) |
| 1943-1947 | Cork | 7 (0-00) |
Inter-county titles
- Munster titles: 2
- All-Irelands: 1
- NFL: 0

David Magnier (30 October 1915 – 10 July 1979) is an Irish sportsperson. He played Gaelic football with his local club Fermoy and was a member of the Cork senior inter-county team from 1944 until 1947.

== Career ==
Magnier first came to Gaelic football prominence as a 17-year-old member of the Fermoy team that claimed the County Intermediate Championship title in 1932. This victory saw him join the Cork minor team in 1933. A stint with the Cork junior team was followed by a call-up to the Cork senior team in 1943. Magnier collected a Munster Championship in his first year with the team, however, it would be 1945 before he joined the starting fifteen. He won his second provincial medal that year before ending the season by lining out at right corner-back when Cork claimed the All-Ireland title after a defeat of Cavan in the final. Magnier ended the year by winning a County Senior Championship medal with Fermoy. He also won a Railway Cup medal with Munster.

== Personal life and death ==
Born in Fermoy, County Cork, Magnier was the son of John Magnier who had played with Fermoy and Cork at the turn of the 20th century. A carpenter by trade, he worked with Ford's in Cork. Magnier died after a period of ill health at the Regional Hospital in Cork on 10 July 1979. He was the seventh member of Cork's 1945 All-Ireland-winning team to die.

== Honours ==
Fermoy

- Cork Senior Football Championship: 1945
- Cork Intermediate Football Championship: 1932

Cork

- All-Ireland Senior Football Championship: 1945
- Munster Senior Football Championship: 1943, 1945

Munster

- Railway Cup: 1946

Sporting positions
| Preceded by Tadhgo Crowley | Cork Senior Football Captain; 1946 | Succeeded by Fachtna O'Donovan |
