= Din Connors =

Irish Gaelic footballer (1917–2004)

Personal information
- Native name: Donncha Ó Conchubhair (Irish)
- Nickname: Din
- Born: 7 January 1917 Millstreet, County Cork, Ireland
- Died: 29 February 2004 (aged 87) Braintree, Massachusetts, U.S.
- Height: 5 ft 11 in (180 cm)

Sport
- Sport: Gaelic Football
- Position: Left corner-back
Clubs
- Years: Club
- Dromtarriffe; Millstreet
Club titles
- Cork titles: 1
Inter-county*
Years	County	Apps (scores)
1941-1948 1949-1952	Cork; New York	13 (0-01)
Inter-county titles
- Munster titles: 2
- All-Irelands: 1
- NFL: 1
- *Inter County team apps and scores correct as of 17:01, 12 April 2012.

Denis O'Connor (7 January 1917 - 29 February 2004), known as Din Connors, was an Irish Gaelic footballer who played for club sides Dromtarriffe and Millstreet and at inter-county level with the Cork and New York senior football teams.

== Career ==
Connors first came to prominence as a Gaelic footballer with Dromtarriffe. His performances for the club saw him called up to the Cork minor team for the 1935 Munster Minor Championship. Such was his performance in the underage grade that Connors was immediately drafted onto the Cork junior team, winning a Munster Junior Championship as a substitute in 1940. He joined the senior team the following year but was an unused substitute. Connors claimed his first senior silverware in 1943 when Cork won the Munster Senior Championship for the first time in 15 years. He won a second provincial title two years later before ending the season by lining out at left wing-back when Cork claimed the All-Ireland title after a defeat of Cavan in the final. Connors played his last game for Cork in 1948, however, his emigration to the United States saw him line out with the New York senior team. He won a National League title after a defeat of Cavan in 1950.

== Death ==
Connors died in Braintree, Massachusetts on 29 February 2004.

== Honours ==
Millstreet

- Cork Senior Football Championship: 1948

Cork

- All-Ireland Senior Football Championship: 1945
- Munster Senior Football Championship: 1943, 1945
- Munster Junior Football Championship: 1940

New York

- National Football League: 1949-50
