= Jimmy Joy (Gaelic footballer) =

Irish Gaelic footballer

Personal information
- Native name: Séamus Siúnéir (Irish)
- Born: 2 September 1917 Killorglin, County Kerry, Ireland
- Died: 10 July 2010 (aged 92) Blackrock, County Dublin, Ireland
- Occupation: Accountant

Sport
- Sport: Gaelic football
- Position: Right wing-forward
Club
- Years: Club
- Geraldines
Club titles
- Dublin titles: 2
Inter-county
- Years: County
- 1941-1942: Dublin
Inter-county titles
- Leinster titles: 2
- All-Irelands: 1
- NFL: 0

James Joy (2 September 1917 – 10 July 2010) was an Irish Gaelic footballer who played for club side Geraldines and at inter-county level with the Dublin senior football team.

== Career ==
After moving to Dublin, Joy came to Gaelic football prominence when he joined the Geraldines club. He won back-to-back County Championship titles in 1941 and 1942. These victories resulted in Joy's inclusion on the Dublin senior football team in 1941, and he won his first Leinster Championship medal that year. He won a second successive provincial title in 1942 after scoring the winning point against Carlow in the final, however, Carlow objected to Joy due to his involvement with rugby. They were awarded the game, a decision which was later overturned, and Dublin went on to win the All-Ireland title after a defeat of Galway. Joy also played rugby for Blackrock and various North Kildare rugby clubs and won a trial for Leinster at which he picked up an injury which ended his competitive sporting career.

== Personal life and death ==
Joy was one of a family of nine born in Killorglin, County Kerry. He won a scholarship to Rockwell College where he was heavily involved in the sporting life of the college as a rugby player. Joy died in Blackrock on 10 July 2010.

== Honours ==
Geraldines

- Dublin Senior Football Championship: 1941, 1942

Dublin

- All-Ireland Senior Football Championship: 1942
- Leinster Senior Football Championship: 1941, 1942
