= Caleb Crone =

Irish Gaelic footballer

Personal information
- Native name: Cálaeb Ó Cróin (Irish)
- Born: 29 November 1919 Rochestown, County Cork, Ireland
- Died: 8 January 1958 (aged 38) Saggart, Dublin, Ireland
- Occupation: Electrical engineer
- Height: 6 ft 0 in (183 cm)

Sport
- Sport: Gaelic football
- Position: Left corner-back
Clubs
- Years: Club
- Air Corps; St Mary's, Saggart
Club titles
- Cork titles: 0
Inter-county
Years	County	Apps (scores)
1941-1943 1944-1948	Dublin; Cork	8 (0-00); 5 (0-00)
Inter-county titles
- Munster titles: 1
- Leinster titles: 2
- All-Irelands: 2
- NFL: 0

Caleb Crone (29 November 1919 – 8 January 1958) was an Irish Gaelic footballer who played as a left corner-back for club sides Air Corps and St Mary's, Saggart and was a member of the Dublin and Cork senior football teams from 1941 until 1948.

== Career ==
Crone first came to Gaelic football prominence playing with the Air Corps club before linking up with St. Mary's in Saggart. He joined the Dublin senior football team in late 1941 before lining out in the 1942 All-Ireland final which saw Dublin claim their first title in 19 years after a 1-10 to 1-08 defeat of Galway. Crone later transferred to the Cork senior football team and collected a second winners' medal after their 2-05 to 0-07 win over Cavan. As a member of the Leinster and Munster inter-provincial teams at various times, he won two Railway Cup medals. Crone was posthumously named on the Cork Team of the Century.

== Personal life and death ==
Born in Rochestown, County Cork, Crone spent much of his youth in Killavullen where his father worked as the station master. He was educated at Sullivan's Quay national school and the Patrician Academy in Mallow. Crone joined the Air Corps in 1937. After his apprenticeship he temporarily transferred to Cork and retired from the Air Corps with the rank of Sergeant. Crone subsequently joined Aer Lingus where he worked as a technician in the simulator training department. Crone married Annie McDermott in Saggart on 6 June 1945 and they had two sons.

Crone died on 8 January 1958. At just 38 years of age, he was the second member of the 1945 All-Ireland-winning team to die.

== Honours ==
Dublin

- All-Ireland Senior Football Championship: 1942
- Munster Senior Football Championship: 1941, 1942

Cork

- All-Ireland Senior Football Championship: 1945
- Munster Senior Football Championship: 1945

Leinster

- Railway Cup: 1944

Munster

- Railway Cup: 1946
