= Matt Fletcher (Gaelic footballer) =

Irish Gaelic footballer (1914–1995)

Personal information
- Native name: Maitiú Mac an Fhleisteir (Irish)
- Born: 17 June 1914 Ringsend, Dublin, Ireland
- Died: 7 June 1995 (aged 80) Kinneagh, County Kildare, Ireland
- Occupation: Dept. of Agriculture employee

Sport
- Sport: Gaelic football
- Position: Centre-back
Clubs
- Years: Club
- Peadar Mackens; Fontenoys Hurling Club
Club titles
- Dublin titles: 0
Inter-county
- Years: County
- 1941–1942: Dublin
Inter-county titles
- Leinster titles: 2
- All-Irelands: 1
- NFL: 0

Mathew Fletcher (17 June 1914 – 7 June 1995) was an Irish Gaelic footballer. At club level he played with Peadar Mackens and Fontenoys Hurling Club and at inter-county level with the Dublin senior football team.

== Career ==
Born in Ringsend in June 1914, Fletcher played Gaelic football with the Peadar Mackens club. He was also a member of Fontenoys Hurling Club. At inter-county level, Fletcher was part of the Dublin senior football team that won the Leinster SFC title in 1941. He won a second consecutive provincial title, as a substitute, in 1942. Fletcher was a late inclusion on the Dublin team that beat Galway by 1–10 to 1–08 in the 1942 All-Ireland SFC final.

== Death ==
Fletcher died on 7 June 1995, at the age of 80.

== Honours ==
Dublin

- All-Ireland Senior Football Championship (1): 1942
- Leinster Senior Football Championship (2): 1941, 1942
