= 2002 O'Byrne Cup =

Gaelic football competition, Leinster, Ireland

Tournament details
- Province: Leinster
- Year: 2002
- Trophy: O'Byrne Cup

Winners
- Champions: Carlow (1st win)
- Manager: Pat Roe
- Captain: Andrew Corden

Runners-up
- Runners-up: Wicklow
- Manager: John O'Leary
- Captain: Ronan Coffey

The 2002 O'Byrne Cup was a Gaelic football competition played by the county teams of Leinster GAA between November 2001 and January 2002.

The tournament was noted for featuring one of the first inter-county Gaelic football games under floodlights, when Meath played Longford in Simonstown Gaels' ground.

It was won by Carlow, their first and (so far) only win. Captain Andrew Corden died in a car crash just three months after.

== Format ==
The eleven teams are drawn into three groups of 4, 4 and 3 teams respectively.

Each team plays each other team in its group once, earning two points for a win and one for a draw.

The 3 group winners advance the semi-finals.

The runners-up in the two groups of 4 teams play a playoff, with the winner advancing to the semi-finals.

== Results ==
=== Group stage ===
Key to colours
Advance to semi-finals
Advance to playoff

==== Group 1 ====
Team	Pld	W	D	L	Diff	Pts
Carlow	3	2	0	1	+4	4
Offaly	3	2	0	1	+3	4
Meath	3	1	0	2	+1	2
Longford	3	1	0	2	–8	2

==== Group 2 ====
Team	Pld	W	D	L	Diff	Pts
Laois	3	2	0	1	+2	4
Wicklow	3	2	0	1	–4	4
Kildare	3	1	1	1	+4	3
Wexford	3	0	1	2	–2	1

==== Group 3 ====
Team	Pld	W	D	L	Diff	Pts
Louth	2	2	0	0	+6	4
Westmeath	2	1	0	1	–4	2
Dublin	2	0	0	2	–2	0

=== Finals ===
==== Playoff ====
2 December 2001

Wicklow	2-12 – 2-9	Offaly
	Report

St. Conleth's Park, Newbridge

==== Semi-finals ====
13 January 2002

Wicklow	0-16 – 2-8	Louth
	Report

Drogheda Park, Drogheda
13 January 2002

Carlow	2-11 – 1-13	Laois
	Report

McCann Park, Portarlington

==== Final ====
20 January 2002

Carlow	2-10 – 0-8	Wicklow
Brian Carbery (1-4, 1-0pen), John Nevin (1-1), Brian Kelly (0-3), Johnny Kavanagh and Garvin Ware (0-1 each)	Report

Dr. Cullen Park, Carlow
