= Brendan Murphy (Cork Gaelic footballer) =

Irish Gaelic footballer (1921–2005)

Personal information
- Native name: Breandán Ó Murchú (Irish)
- Born: 1921 Bere Island, County Cork, Ireland
- Died: 8 July 2005 (aged 83) Bere Island, County Cork, Ireland

Sport
- Sport: Gaelic football
- Position: Full-back
Clubs
- Years: Club
- Bere Island; Beara
Club titles
- Cork titles: 0
Inter-county
Years	County	Apps (scores)
1945-1946	Cork	0 (0-00)
Inter-county titles
- Munster titles: 1
- All-Irelands: 1
- NFL: 0

Timothy Brendan Murphy (1921 – 8 July 2005) was an Irish Gaelic football player and administrator who played for club side Bere Island, divisional side Beara and at inter-county level with the Cork senior football team.

== Career ==
Murphy first played Gaelic football with Bere Island, winning several divisional championships before claiming a County Junior Championship title in 1943. He was a regular member of the Beara divisional team from 1942 until 1959, lining out in almost every position including goalkeeper. Murphy was drafted onto the Cork senior football team in 1945 and was an unused substitute when Cork claimed the All-Ireland title after a defeat of Cavan in the final. His older brother "Weesh" Murphy was full-back on the same team. In 1946 Murphy lined out with the Cork junior team before again being an unused substitute with the Cork senior team. As an administrator, he was treasurer of the Beara GAA Board in 1947; registrar from 1955 and chairman from 1958 until 1964. Murphy served as president of the Beara Board from 1990 until 2005.

== Honours ==
Bere Island

- Cork Junior Football Championship: 1943
- Beara Junior Football Championship: 1939, 1941, 1942

Cork

- All-Ireland Senior Football Championship: 1945
- Munster Senior Football Championship: 1945
