= Ned Casey =

Irish Gaelic footballer

Personal information
- Native name: Éamonn Ó Cathasaigh (Irish)
- Nickname: Togher
- Born: 8 July 1917 Macroom, County Cork, Ireland
- Died: 10 May 1991 (aged 73) Macroom, County Cork, Ireland
- Height: 5 ft 8 in (173 cm)

Sport
- Sport: Gaelic football
- Position: Right wing-forward
Clubs
- Years: Club
- Macroom; Clonakilty
Club titles
- Cork titles: 2
Inter-county
Years	County	Apps (scores)
1940–1947	Cork	12 (1–10)
Inter-county titles
- Munster titles: 2
- All-Irelands: 1
- NFL: 0

Edward Casey (8 July 1917 – 10 May 1991) was an Irish Gaelic footballer who played as a forward for club sides Macroom and Clonakilty, at inter-county level with the Cork senior football team and at inter-provincial level with Munster.

== Playing career ==
Casey began his career by captaining the Macroom minor team to the County Championship title in 1935. He quickly joined the club's senior side, however, he transferred for a short while to Clonakilty and won back-to-back County Championship titles in 1943 and 1944. By this stage, Casey was a regular with the Cork senior football team, having made his debut at centre-back in 1940. He won his first Munster Championship title in 1943. Casey claimed a second provincial winners' medal in 1945 before ending the season with an All-Ireland medal after a defeat of Cavan in the final. He added a Railway Cup medal to his collection in 1946. Casey's inter-county career ended in 1947, however, he continued to line out at club level with the Macroom junior team until the 1950s.

== Death ==
Casey died at his home in Macroom on 10 May 1991.

== Honours ==
Macroom

- Cork Minor Football Championship: 1935 (c)

Clonakilty

- Cork Senior Football Championship: 1943, 1944

Cork

- All-Ireland Senior Football Championship: 1945
- Munster Senior Football Championship: 1943, 1945

Munster

- Railway Cup: 1946
