= Bill Kinnerk =

Irish Gaelic footballer and politician

Personal information
- Native name: Liam Mac an Airchinn (Irish)
- Nickname: Billum
- Born: 14 November 1907 Tralee, County Kerry, Ireland
- Died: 6 September 1983 (75) Tralee, County Kerry, Ireland
- Occupation: CIÉ employee
- Height: 5 ft 11 in (180 cm)

Sport
- Sport: Gaelic football
- Position: Left corner-back
Club
- Years: Club
- John Mitchels
Club titles
- Kerry titles: 2
Inter-county*
| Years | County | Apps (scores) |
| 1932-1939 | Kerry | 19 (0-00) |
Inter-county titles
- Munster titles: 5
- All-Irelands: 2
- NFL: 0
- *Inter County team apps and scores correct as of 18:45, 18 June 2020.

William Kinnerk (14 November 1907 – 6 September 1983) was an Irish Gaelic footballer and local politician. At club level he played with the John Mitchels club and was an All-Ireland Championship medallist with the Kerry senior football team.

== Playing career ==
Born in Tralee, Kinnerk first played competitive Gaelic football with Tralee Technical School. After lining out with a number of local clubs, he joined John Mitchels and claimed his first Kerry Senior Football Championship medal in his debut year in 1929. He claimed a second county medal as team captain in 1937. Kinnerk first joined the Kerry senior football team in 1932 and ended the year by winning his first All-Ireland Senior Football Championship medal as a substitute. He broke onto the starting fifteen the following year, and was a regular member of the team until his retirement after a tour of the United States in 1939. During that time Kinnerk won five Munster Championship medals as well as claiming an All-Ireland medal on the field of play in 1937.

== Honours ==
Dingle

- Kerry Senior Football Championship (2): 1929, 1937 (c)

Kerry

- All-Ireland Senior Football Championship (2): 1932, 1937
- Munster Senior Football Championship (5): 1932, 1934, 1936, 1937, 1938 (c)

Sporting positions
| Preceded by Miko Doyle | Kerry Senior Football Captain; 1938 | Succeeded by Tom O'Connor |
