= Alan Lotty =

Irish hurler (1920–1973)

Personal information
- Native name: Ailéin Ó Lotaigh (Irish)
- Born: 15 July 1920 Glanmire, County Cork, Ireland
- Died: 10 February 1973 (aged 52) St. Finbarr's Hospital, Cork, Ireland
- Occupation: CIÉ employee
- Height: 5 ft 10 in (178 cm)

Sport
- Sport: Hurling
- Position: Centre-back
Club
- Years: Club
- 1937–1950: Sarsfields
Club titles
- Cork titles: 0
Inter-county*
Years	County	Apps (scores)
1939–1949	Cork	30 (0–01)
Inter-county titles
- Munster titles: 5
- All-Irelands: 5
- NHL: 3
- *Inter County team apps and scores correct as of 14:34, 23 March 2019.

Alan Lotty (15 July 1920 – 10 February 1973) was an Irish hurler who played for Cork Championship club Sarsfields. He played for the Cork senior hurling team for 10 years, during which time he usually lined out as a corner-back or as a wing-back.

Lotty began his hurling career at club level with Sarsfields. He broke onto the club's top adult team as a 16-year-old in 1937, however, his club career coincided with a barren spell for the club. Lotty played his last game for the club in 1950.

At inter-county level, Lotty was part of the successful Cork minor team that won the All-Ireland Championship in 1938. He joined the Cork senior team in 1939. From his debut, Lotty was ever-present as a corner-back or wing-back and made 30 Championship appearances in a career that ended with his last game in 1949. During that time he was part of five All-Ireland Championship-winning teams – in 1941, 1942, 1943, 1944 and 1946. Lotty also secured five Munster Championship medals and three National Hurling League medals.

At inter-provincial level, Lotty was selected to play in two championship campaigns with Munster. He ended his career without a Railway Cup medal after finishing as runner-up in 1941 and 1947.

== Playing career ==
=== Sarsfields ===
Lotty played his club hurling with Sarsfield's but enjoyed little success.

In 1940 he lined out in his first championship decider at senior level as a Jack Lynch-driven Glen Rovers aimed to capture a seventh successive championship. In one of the most high-scoring county finals of all time, Lotty's side were defeated on a 10–6 to 7–5 score line.

It took seven years for Sarsfield's to reach the county decider once again, however, there was defeat for Lotty's side once again. St. Finbarr's were the opponents on that occasion and won the game on a score line of 4–6 to 4–4 after scoring a late goal.

By the time Sarsfield's made their breakthrough in 1951 Lotty had retired from hurling.

=== Cork ===
==== Minor ====
Lotty first played for Cork when he was drafted onto the minor football team during the 1937 Munster Minor Championship. He became a dual player the following year when he also joined the Cork minor hurling team. After making a winning hurling debut against Limerick on 22 May 1938, he later collected a Munster Championship medal after a 9–03 to no score victory over Kerry in the final. On 4 September 1938, Lotty was again at full-back when Cork qualified for the All-Ireland final against Dublin. He ended what was his last game in the minor grade with a winners' medal after the 7–02 to 5–04 victory.

==== Senior ====
Lotty's performances at minor level brought him to the attention of the Cork senior football team selectors and he was drafted onto the team during the 1938-39 National League. His inter-county football career was a brief one as he joined the Cork senior hurling team in advance of the 1939 Munster Championship and made his championship debut at left corner-back on 25 June 1939 in a 7–04 to 4–03 defeat of Waterford. Lotty subsequently claimed his first Munster Championship medal after a 4–03 to 3–04 victory over Limerick in the final. On 3 September 1939, he replaced Paddy O'Donovan at right corner-back when Cork suffered a 2–07 to 3–03 defeat by Kilkenny in the "thunder and Lightning" All-Ireland final.

Lotty claimed his first national silverware when Cork defeated Tipperary by 8–09 to 6–04 to win the 1939-40 National League title. He was again at full-back when Cork surrendered their provincial title to Limerick in the 1940 Munster final.

After winning a second successive National League medal after a 4–11 to 2–07 victory over Dublin in the 1941 league final, Lotty lined out in the second All-Ireland final of his career on 28 September 1941 when he was selected at left corner-back against Dublin. He ended the game with his first All-Ireland medal after the 5–11 to 0–06 victory. Lotty ended the season by lining out in Cork's 5–04 to 2–05 defeat by Tipperary in the delayed Munster final.

Lotty lined out in a fourth successive Munster final - coming on as a substitute - the following year, with Cork claiming the title after a 4–15 to 4–01 defeat of Tipperary. He was selected at right wing-back for the subsequent All-Ireland final against Dublin and collected his second successive All-Ireland winners' medal after a 2–14 to 3–04 victory.

After winning a third provincial championship medal after a 2–13 to 3–08 victory over Waterford in the 1943 Munster final, Lotty subsequently lined out in a third successive All-Ireland final. He claimed a third successive winners' medal after the 5–16 to 0–04 victory over Antrim.

Lotty claimed a third successive Munster Championship winners' medal - the fourth of his career - after a 4–06 to 3–06 victory over Limerick in the 1944 Munster final replay. On 3 September 1944, he lined out at left wing-back in a fourth successive All-Ireland final appearance and ended the 2–13 to 1–02 victory over Dublin by becoming one of a select group of players to have won four successive All-Ireland medals.

After failing to secure a fifth successive title in 1945, Lotty won a fifth provincial championship winners' medal after lining out at centre-back in the 3–08 to 1–03 defeat of Limerick in the 1946 Munster final. For the fifth time in six seasons, he lined out in the subsequent All-Ireland final with Kilkenny providing the opposition. Lotty claimed a fifth All-Ireland winners' medal after again lining out at centre-back in the 7–05 to 3–08 victory.

Lotty missed Cork's opening game of the 1947 Munster Championship but claimed a sixth winners' medal after being restored to centre-back for the 2–06 to 2–03 defeat of Limerick in the final. He was again at centre-back for his seventh All-Ireland final appearance on 7 September 1947, but ended the game on the losing side after the 0–14 to 2–07 defeat by Kilkenny in what is regarded as one of the greatest games of all time.

Lotty won a third National League medal after a 3–03 to 1–02 defeat of Tipperary in the 1948 league final, however, injury later ruled him out of the 1948 Munster final which Cork lost by 4–07 to 3–09 to Waterford. A defeat by Tipperary in the 1949 Munster Championship brought the curtain down on Lotty's inter-county career.

=== Munster ===
Lotty also had the honour of being selected for Munster in the inter-provincial series of games. He made his debut with the province in 1941, however, Munster faced a one-point defeat by Leinster in the final.

After an absence of six years Lotty was back on the Munster team once again. A 2–5 to 1–1 defeat by Connacht was Munster's lot once again.

== Death ==
On 10 February 1973, Lotty died at St. Finbarr's Hospital in Cork after suffering a severe heart attack a week earlier. After the news of his death, leading figures from the world of hurling paid tribute to him. Former teammate and incumbent Taoiseach, Jack Lynch, described him as "one of the most stylish hurlers I have ever seen." His funeral took place at St. Michael's Church in his adopted home of Blackrock two days later. Lotty was the second member of the Cork four-in-a-row team to die, the first being full-back Batt Thornhill in 1970, and many of the surviving players were in attendance, including a representative of the Taoiseach.

== Honours ==
Cork

- All-Ireland Senior Hurling Championship (5): 1941, 1942, 1943, 1944, 1946
- Munster Senior Hurling Championship (5): 1939, 1943, 1944, 1946, 1947
- National Hurling League (3): 1939–40, 1940–41, 1947–48
- All-Ireland Minor Hurling Championship (1): 1938
- Munster Minor Hurling Championship (1): 1938
