= Paddy Cronin (Gaelic footballer) =

Irish Gaelic footballer

Personal information
- Native name: Pádraig Ó Cróinín (Irish)
- Born: 1921 Ballingeary, County Cork, Ireland
- Died: 21 February 1991 (aged 69) Walkinstown, Dublin, Ireland
- Occupation: National school teacher
- Height: 5 ft 9 in (175 cm)

Sport
- Sport: Gaelic Football
- Position: Right wing-back
Clubs
- Years: Club
- Béal Átha'n Ghaorthaidh; Fermoy; Bride Rovers
Club titles
- Cork titles: 1
College
- Years: College
- St Patrick's College
College titles
- Sigerson titles: 0
Inter-county*
Years	County	Apps (scores)
1943-1947	Cork	8 (0-01)
Inter-county titles
- Munster titles: 2
- All-Irelands: 1
- NFL: 0
- *Inter County team apps and scores correct as of 17:01, 12 April 2012.

Patrick Cronin (1921 - 21 February 1991) was an Irish Gaelic footballer who played for club sides Béal Átha'n Ghaorthaidh and Fermoy, and at inter-county level with the Cork senior football team. He usually lined out as a right wing-back.

== Career ==
Cronin first came to Gaelic football prominence as a student when he was selected for the Munster colleges' team. He was included on the Cork minor team in 1938 before winning a Munster Minor Championship the following year. Cronin was added to the Cork senior team in 1943 and ended the season with a Munster Championship title. After being dropped from the starting fifteen the following year, he won his second provincial medal tin 1945 before ending the season by lining out at right wing-back when Cork claimed the All-Ireland title after a defeat of Cavan in the final. Cronin ended the year by captaining his adopted club of Fermoy to the County Championship title. He won a Railway Cup medal with Munster in 1946, however, a spinal injury soon brought his inter-county career to an end.

== Personal life and death ==
Cronin qualified as a national school teacher and worked in Fermoy and Bartlemy before settling in Dublin. He died at his home in Walkinstown on 21 February 1991 after a period of ill health.

== Honours ==
Fermoy

- Cork Senior Football Championship: 1945 (c)

Cork

- All-Ireland Senior Football Championship: 1945
- Munster Senior Football Championship: 1943, 1945
- Munster Minor Football Championship: 1939

Munster

- Railway Cup: 1946
