= Derry Beckett =

Irish Gaelic footballer and hurler

Personal information
- Native name: Diarmuid Beicéid (Irish)
- Born: 24 December 1919 Glanmire, County Cork, Ireland
- Died: 28 August 1959 (aged 39) Macclesfield, England
- Occupation: Doctor
- Height: 5 ft 7 in (170 cm)

Sport
- Football Position: Left corner-forward
- Hurling Position: Left corner-forward
Clubs
- Years: Club
- Sarsfields; St Finbarr's
Club titles
	Football	Hurling
Cork titles	0	2
College
- Years: College
- University College Cork
College titles
- Sigerson titles: 2
- Fitzgibbon titles: 3
Inter-county
Years	County	Apps (scores)
1945-1947 1941-1946	Cork (SF); Cork (SH)	4 (2-10); 5 (6-03)
Inter-county titles
	Football	Hurling
Munster Titles	1	2
All-Ireland Titles	1	2
League titles	0	0

Jeremiah Christopher "Derry" Beckett (24 December 1919 – 28 August 1959) was an Irish Gaelic footballer and hurler. At club level, he played with Sarsfields and St Finbarr's and at inter-county level was a dual player with the Cork senior teams.

== Career ==
Born in Cork and raised in nearby Glanmire, Beckett was educated at Riverstown NS and Christian Brothers College. He later studied medicine at University College Cork, where he also played hurling and Gaelic football to a high standard. Beckett was part of two Sigerson Cup-winning teams during his time there, while he also won three Fitzgibbon Cup medals.

At club level, Beckett was part of the Sarfsields team beaten by Glen Rovers in the 1940 Cork SHC final. He later transferred to the St Finbarr's club and won Cork SHC medals in 1942 and 1946.

Beckett first appeared on the inter-county scene for Cork as part of the minor team beaten by Kilkenny in the 1936 All-Ireland MHC final. He was part of the Cork senior hurling team during the team's run of four successive All-Ireland SHC titles, with Beckett collecting consecutive winners' medals in 1941 and 1942. He is credited with being the first player to wear protective headgear in a hurling game. Beckett later joined the Cork senior football team and added an All-Ireland SFC medal to his collection, after scoring the decisive goal in the 2–05 to 0–07 win over Cavan in the 1945 All-Ireland SFC final.

Beckett's performances at inter-county level earned his inclusion on the Munster team in the Railway Cup. When his inter-county career ended, he turned his attention to soccer and briefly lined out with Cork United.

== Personal life and death ==
His father, Jerry Beckett, was also a dual player with Cork and was part of the All-Ireland SFC-winning team in 1911. A brother, William Beckett, played minor hurling for Cork in 1933. After graduating in medicine in 1947, Beckett spent eight years at the Ebbw Vale Hospital in Wales. He later spent a period of time studying in Canada before returning and taking up practice in Macclesfield.

Beckett died on 28 August 1959, at the age of 38. He was the second of Cork's 1945 All-Ireland SFC-winning team to die.

== Honours ==
University College Cork

- Sigerson Cup (2): 1944, 1947
- Fitzgibbon Cup (3): 1939, 1940, 1947

St Finbarr's

- Cork Senior Hurling Championship (2): 1942, 1946

Cork

- All-Ireland Senior Football Championship (1): 1945
- All-Ireland Senior Hurling Championship (2): 1941, 1942
- Munster Senior Football Championship (1): 1945
- Munster Senior Hurling Championship (2): 1941, 1942
- Munster Minor Hurling Championship (1): 1936
