= Éamonn Young =

Irish Gaelic footballer and hurler

Personal information
- Native name: Éamonn de Siún (Irish)
- Born: 7 August 1921 Dunmanway, County Cork, Ireland
- Died: 3 August 2007 (aged 85) Bishopstown, Cork, Ireland
- Occupations: Army officer and teacher
- Height: 5 ft 8 in (173 cm)

Sport
- Sport: Gaelic football
- Position: Midfield
Clubs
- Years: Club
- Dohenys; Glen Rovers; Collins
Club titles
	Football	Hurling
Cork titles	3	1
Inter-county
Years	County	Apps (scores)
1942–1953	Cork	25 (4–16)
Inter-county titles
- Munster titles: 4
- All-Irelands: 1
- NFL: 1

Edward D. Young (7 August 1921 – 3 August 2007), known as Éamonn Young, was an Irish Gaelic football player, trainer and selector. Throughout a club career that spanned over 25 years, he played for several clubs in Cork and experienced championship success in different grades with Dohenys, Glen Rovers and Collins. At inter-county level, he was midfield partner to Fachtna O'Donovan on the Cork senior football team that won the 1945 All-Ireland Championship; he had earlier won the first of four Munster Championship medals and ended his career with a National League title as team captain. As well as club and county successes, Young was a regular for Munster for the best part of a decade and won three Railway Cup medals. His inter-county career was followed by several periods as a team trainer and selector.

Young is widely considered one of the best players of his generation, and among the greatest of all time, as well as being regarded by many in the sport as Cork's greatest ever player. An Irish Examiner obituary described him as "an icon of Cork sport" and "the Christy Ring of football." Young was named at midfield on the Cork Team of the Century in 1984 and at left wing-forward on the Cork Team of the Millennium in 2000.

== Playing career ==
=== Club ===
Young joined the Dohenys club at a young age, while simultaneously coming to public notice in the primary schools shield competition with Dunmanway National School. A move to Cork saw him join the Glen Rovers club, with whom he won a County Hurling Championship medal in 1940 after coming on as a substitute in the final against Sarsfields.

Young's military career saw him line out with Collins Barracks during a golden age for the barracks' football club. He won three County Football Championship titles from four final appearances between 1949 and 1953 following defeats of Macroom, St. Nicholas' and University College Cork.

The twilight of his club career saw Young return to the Dohenys club almost 20 years after leaving. His return saw him help the club to three South West Junior Championship titles before winning a County Junior Championship title after a replay defeat of Grange in 1966.

=== Inter-county ===
Young, ironically, first came to prominence on the inter-county scene as a member of the Cork minor hurling team. He won a Munster medal at this level in 1938, and subsequently collected an All-Ireland. In 1939, the success continued and Young was a dual medal winner in Munster. He later won a second All-Ireland minor hurling medal in the company of the legendary Christy Ring. Young graduated onto the Cork junior football team in 1940 and won a Munster medal before joining the county senior team in 1943. He won a senior Munster title that year, however, Cork were later beaten in the All-Ireland semi-final. Two years later, in 1945, Young won a second Munster medal before lining out in Croke Park for the All-Ireland final. On that day, he won his only senior All-Ireland medal as Cork defeated Cavan. It was the Leesiders first championship title since 1911. Young won a third provincial title in 1949, however, Cork failed in the All-Ireland semi-final. Three years later, in 1952, Young was captain of the Cork senior football team. That year, he won a National Football League medal before collecting a fourth Munster title. Once again, however, Cork failed in the All-Ireland semi-final. Young retired from inter-county football in 1953.

Young also won Railway Cup medals with Munster in 1941, 1946 and 1949.

== Personal life ==
Young was born into a prominent family in Dunmanway, County Cork. His father, Jack Young, won an All-Ireland medal with Cork in 1911. His uncle, Ned Young, was the last-surviving participant of the Kilmichael Ambush during the War of Independence. His brother, Jim Young, won five All-Ireland medals with the Cork senior hurling team, including four-in-a-row, and is regarded as one of the county's all-time greats.

Young was educated at Dunmanway National School and later boarded at Good Counsel College in New Ross. He subsequently had a very successful career with the Irish Army. He did a tour of duty with the 38th Battalion in the Congo in 1963. He did a second tour in 1967, this time with the B Company 8th Infantry in Cyprus. When he returned from Cyprus, Young completed a Bachelor of Arts in University College Cork in 1970. He subsequently retired from the army with the rank of commandant and took up a teaching post in Coláiste an Spioraid Naoimh in Bishopstown. He was conferred with a Master of Arts in 1978.

Young married Monica McNamee in July 1946. She was a well-known Wagnerian soprano who sang on several occasions in the Capitol in Dublin and later trained many singers. Young's wife predeceased him in September 1994.

== Death ==
On 3 August 2007, Young died at his home in Bishopstown aged 85. He was the last-surviving member of Cork's 1945 All-Ireland Championship-winning team.

== Honours ==
=== Player ===
Dohenys

- Cork Junior Football Championship: 1966
- South West Junior A Football Championship: 1962, 1965, 1966

Glen Rovers

- Cork Senior Hurling Championship: 1940

Collins

- Cork Senior Football Championship: 1949, 1951, 1953

Cork

- All-Ireland Senior Football Championship: 1945
- Munster Senior Football Championship: 1943, 1945, 1949, 1952
- National Football League: 1951-52
- National Hurling League: 1940-41
- All-Ireland Minor Hurling Championship: 1938, 1939
- Munster Minor Hurling Championship: 1938, 1939

Munster

- Railway Cup: 1941, 1946, 1949

=== Trainer ===
Cork

- Munster Senior Football Championship: 1956, 1957
- National Football League: 1955-56

Sporting positions
Preceded by Con McGrath	Cork Senior Football Captain; 1952	Succeeded by Humphrey O'Neill
