= 1951–52 National Football League (Ireland) =

Gaelic football competition

League details
- Dates: 6 October 1951 – 30 September 1952

League champions
- Winners: Cork (1st win)
- Captain: Éamonn Young

League runners-up
- Runners-up: New York
- Captain: Tom "Gega" O'Connor

The 1951–52 National Football League was the 21st staging of the National Football League (NFL), an annual Gaelic football tournament for the Gaelic Athletic Association county teams of Ireland.

Cork beat Dublin in the home final and easily dismissed New York in the Polo Grounds final, played at night under floodlights. New York didn't return to the final until 1963.

== Format ==
Teams are placed into Divisions I, II, III and IV. The top team in each division reaches the home semi-finals. The winner of the home final plays New York in the NFL final.

== Results ==
=== Division III ===
Cork won, ahead of Galway, Clare, Mayo and Kerry.

=== Finals ===
27 April 1952
Home Final

Cork	2-3 – 1-5	Dublin

Croke Park, Dublin
Attendance: 30,070
Referee: Dan Ryan (Kerry)

18 May 1952
Final
9:00 p.m. EDT

Cork	1-12 – 0-3	New York
		Tom O'Connor 0-2, Pat McAndrew 0-1

Polo Grounds, New York City
Attendance: 33,914
Referee: Dan Ryan (Kerry)
