= Mick Falvey =

Irish Gaelic footballer and manager

Personal information
- Native name: Mícheál Ó Fáilbhe (Irish)
- Born: Dingle, Kerry, Ireland

Sport
- Sport: Gaelic football
- Position: Midfield
Club
- Years: Club
- 1940s: Civil Service
Club titles
- Dublin titles: 1
Inter-county
Years	County	Apps (scores)
	Dublin	?
Inter-county titles
- Leinster titles: 2
- All-Irelands: 1

Michael Falvey (1 April 1917 – 20 December 2006) was a Gaelic footballer who played with the Dublin county team. Despite being from Dingle, County Kerry, Falvey won the All-Ireland Senior Football Championship as a Dublin player in 1942 in a final against Galway. Falvey played with Civil Service in 1944 when they won the Dublin Senior Football Championship and was denied a second title when Civil Service were defeated by Parnells in 1945. Michael attended secondary school at CBS Dingle. Mick Falvey died following a short illness in the Mater Hospital on Wednesday, 20 December 2006.
