= Andrew Corden =

Irish Gaelic footballer

Personal information
- Native name: Aindriú Cóirdáin (Irish)
- Born: County Carlow, Ireland

Sport
- Sport: Gaelic football
Club
- Years: Club
- O'Hanrahan's
Club titles
- Carlow titles: 3
- Leinster titles: 1
Inter-county
- Years: County
- Carlow

Andrew Corden (1978 – 19 May 2002) was a Gaelic footballer. He was the youngest of five children of Frank and Mary Corden. Considered one of Carlow's finest full-backs, he captained the senior intercounty team—his final game coming seven days before his sudden death at the age of 24. He also captained his club team O'Hanrahan's, leading them to a third successive Carlow Senior Football Championship the year before he died.

The death of Corden was the first part of a double disaster for Carlow's footballers. Just as they were preparing to return to full training the sudden death occurred of player Sean Kavanagh's father.

Prior to his death, he led Carlow to the O'Byrne Cup, their first senior trophy. He also led the Carlow team that beat the Dubs in the Kevin Jordan tournament final.
