= List of National Football League (Ireland) finals =

This page is a list of final matches for the National Football League (NFL), an annual Gaelic football tournament played by the GAA county teams of Ireland, and some teams from outside Ireland.

Below is a list of all NFL finals (or NFL champions for those seasons in which no final was played). The letters AI indicate the county went on to win the All-Ireland Senior Football Championship that year. In the past NFL has been a poor predictor of summer form: only 26.6% (21/79) of League winners have gone on to become All-Ireland champions. However, since the re–formatting of the competition in 2002, the winner of the national league has more regularly gone on to win the All–Ireland on nine out of sixteen occasions: Tyrone (once) in 2003, Kerry (thrice) in 2004, 2006 and 2009, Cork (once) in 2010 and Dublin (four times) in 2013, 2015, 2016 and 2018.

There have been 2 perfect inter-county seasons in gaelic football history. These 2 teams had no losses or draws in the League or in the Championship. They won both the League and the All Ireland Championship. The 1929 Kerry team won all 7 games in the League and all 4 games in the All Ireland Championship. The 1932 Kerry team won all 5 games in the League and all 4 games in the Championship.

The 2016 Dublin team came very close to a perfect season. They won all 9 games in the League. In the Championship, they had 6 wins, 1 draw and zero losses.

== List of finals ==
- 1925–26 – Laois 2–1 Dublin 1–0
- 1926–27 – League not held
- 1927–28 – Kerry 2–4 Kildare 1–6
- 1928–29 – AI Kerry 1–7 Kildare 2–3
- 1929–30 – League not held
- 1930–31 – AI Kerry 1–3 Cavan 1–2
- 1931–32 – AI Kerry 5–2 Cork 3–3
- 1932–33 – Meath 0–10 Cavan 1–6
- 1933–34 – Mayo 2–4 Dublin 1–5
- 1934–35 – Mayo 5–8 Fermanagh 0–2
- 1935–36 – AI Mayo were champions with 12 points from eight games
- 1936–37 – Mayo 5–4 Meath 1–8
- 1937–38 – Mayo 3–9 Wexford 1–3
- 1938–39 – Mayo 5–9 Meath 0–6
- 1939–40 – Galway 2–5 Meath 1–5
- 1940–41 – Mayo 3–7 Dublin 0–7
- 1941–45 – League suspended for four seasons
- 1945–46 – Meath 2–2 Wexford 0–6
- 1946–47 – Derry 2–9 Clare 2–5
- 1947–48 – AI Cavan 5–9 Cork 2–8 (replay)
- 1948–49 – Mayo 1–8 Louth 1–6
- 1949–50 – New York 2-8 Cavan 0-12 (Home final:Cavan 2–8 Meath 1–6
- 1950–51 – Meath 0–6 Mayo 0–3
- 1951–52 – Cork 1–12 New York 0–3 (Home final: Cork 2–3 Dublin 1–5)
- 1952–53 – Dublin 4–6 Cavan 0–9
- 1953–54 – Mayo 2–10 Carlow 0–3
- 1954–55 – Dublin 2–12 Meath 1–3
- 1955–56 – Cork 0–8 Meath 0–7
- 1956–57 – Galway 1–8 Kerry 0–6
- 1957–58 – AI Dublin 3–13 Kildare 3–8
- 1958–59 – AI Kerry 2–8 Derry 1–8
- 1959–60 – AI Down 0–12 Cavan 0–9
- 1960–61 – Kerry 4–16 Derry 1–5
- 1961–62 – Down 2–5 Dublin 1–7
- 1962–63 – Kerry 1–18 New York 1–10 (Home final: Kerry 0–9 Down 1–5)
- 1963–64 – New York 2–12 Dublin 1–13 (Home final: Dublin 2–9 Down 0–7)
- 1964–65 – AI Galway 4–12 New York 0–17 (two-legged final; home final: Galway 1–7 Kerry 0–8)
- 1965–66 – Longford 1–18 New York 0–17 (two-legged final; home final: Longford 0–9 Galway 0–8)
- 1966–67 – New York 7–8 Galway 1–16 (two-legged final; home final: Galway 0–12 Dublin 1–7)
- 1967–68 – AI Down 2–14 Kildare 2–11
- 1968–69 – AI Kerry 2–33 New York 2–24 (two-legged final; home final: Kerry 3–11 Offaly 0–8)
- 1969–70 – Mayo 4–7 Down 0–10
- 1970–71 – Kerry 0–11 Mayo 0–8
- 1971–72 – Kerry 2–11 Mayo 1–9
- 1972–73 – Kerry 2–12 Offaly 0–14
- 1973–74 – Kerry 0–14 Roscommon 0–8 (replay)
- 1974–75 – Meath 0–16 Dublin 1–9
- 1975–76 – AI Dublin 2–10 Derry 0–15
- 1976–77 – Kerry 1–8 Dublin 1–6
- 1977–78 – Dublin 2–18 Mayo 2–13
- 1978–79 – Roscommon 0–15 Cork 1–3
- 1979–80 – Cork 0–11 Kerry 0–10
- 1980–81 – Galway 1–11 Roscommon 1–3
- 1981–82 – Kerry 1–9 Cork 0–5 (replay)
- 1982–83 – Down 1–8 Armagh 0–8
- 1983–84 – AI Kerry 1–11 Galway 0–11
- 1984–85 – Monaghan 1–11 Armagh 0–9
- 1985-86 – Laois 2–6 Monaghan 2–5
- 1986-87 – Dublin 1–11 Kerry 0–11
- 1987-88 – AI Meath 2–13 Dublin 0–11 (replay)
- 1988-89 – AI Cork 0–15 Dublin 0–12
- 1989-90 – Meath 2–7 Down 0–11
- 1990-91 – Dublin 1–9 Kildare 0–10
- 1991-92 – Derry 1–10 Tyrone 1–8
- 1992-93 – Dublin 0–10 Donegal 0–6 (replay)
- 1993-94 – Meath 2–11 Armagh 0–8
- 1994-95 – Derry 0–12 Donegal 0–8
- 1995-96 – Derry 1–16 Donegal 1–9
- 1996-97 – AI Kerry 3–7 Cork 1–8
- 1997-98 – Offaly 0–9 Derry 0–7
- 1998-99 – Cork 0–12 Dublin 1–7
- 1999–2000 – Derry 1–8 Meath 0–9
- 2000–01 – Mayo 0–13 Galway 0–12
- 2002 – Tyrone 0–15 Cavan 0–7
- 2003 – AI Tyrone 0–21 Laois 1–8
- 2004 – AI Kerry 3–11 Galway 1–16
- 2005 – Armagh 1–21 Wexford 1–14
- 2006 – AI Kerry 2–11 Galway 0–11
- 2007 – Donegal 0–13 Mayo 0–10
- 2008 – Derry 2–13 Kerry 2–9
- 2009 – AI Kerry 1–15 Derry 0–15
- 2010 – AI Cork 1–17 Mayo 0–12
- 2011 – Cork 0-21 Dublin 2-14
- 2012 – Cork 2-10 Mayo 0-11
- 2013 – AI Dublin 0-18 Tyrone 0-17
- 2014 – Dublin 3-19 Derry 1-10
- 2015 – AI Dublin 1-21 Cork 2-7
- 2016 – AI Dublin 2-18 Kerry 0-13
- 2017 – Kerry 0–20 Dublin 1–16
- 2018 – AI Dublin 0–18 Galway 0–14
- 2019 – Mayo 3-11 Kerry 2-10
- 2020 – Kerry – Dublin Round–Robin
- 2021 – Dublin and Kerry shared the title, final not played due to COVID-19
- 2022 - AI Kerry 3-19 Mayo 0-13
- 2023 - Mayo 0-14 Galway 0-11
- 2024 - Derry 3-18 Dublin 2-21 (AET, Derry win 3-1 on penalties)
- 2025 - AI Kerry 1-18 Mayo 1-12
- 2026 - Donegal 3-20 Kerry 2-10

== See also ==
- List of All-Ireland Senior Football Championship finals
