= Jerry Beckett =

Irish Gaelic footballer

Personal information
- Native name: Diarmaid Beicéid (Irish)
- Born: 4 June 1886 Cromane, County Kerry, Ireland
- Died: 30 May 1943 (aged 56) Glanmire, County Kerry, Ireland
- Occupation: National school teacher

Sport
- Sport: Gaelic Football
- Position: Forward
Club
- Years: Club
- Lees
Club titles
- Cork titles: 5
Inter-county*
Years	County	Apps (scores)
1907-1917	Cork	15 (1-02)
Inter-county titles
- Munster titles: 2
- All-Irelands: 1
- *Inter County team apps and scores correct as of 23:20, 10 April 2012.

Jeremiah Alphonsus Beckett (4 June 1886 – 30 May 1943), better known as Jerry Beckett, was an Irish Gaelic footballer who played as a forward for the Cork senior team.

Beckett made his first appearance for the team during the 1907 championship and was a regular member of the starting fifteen for the following ten years. During that time he won one All-Ireland medal and two Munster medals.

At club level Beckett was a multiple county senior championship medal winner with Lees.

Beckett's son, Derry, was a dual All-Ireland medal winner with Cork in the 1940s.
