= Erin's Hope GAA (Dublin) =

Gaelic sports club in Dublin, Ireland

Erin's Hope
- Dóchas Éireann
- County: Dublin
- Nickname: The Hopes

Erin's Hope (Irish: Dóchas Éireann) was a Gaelic football club in Dublin, Ireland, linked to St Patrick's College in Drumcondra. It won the Dublin Senior Football Championship four times, in 1887, 1932, 1956 and 1978, and was the first winner of the competition.

== History ==
Erin's Hope won the inaugural Dublin Senior Football Championship in 1887. The club won a second title in 1932.

By the 1950s, Erin's Hope was the football team of St Patrick's College, whose students came from counties across Ireland. In 1956 the club defeated St Vincent's in the county final. St Vincent's had dominated the championship in the preceding years and were seeking an eighth successive title.

The Galway footballer Mattie McDonagh, then a student at the college, played on the team in the same year that he won an All-Ireland medal with Galway. Kerry's Tom Long, who also qualified as a teacher at the college, was another member of the side.

Erin's Hope won a fourth title in 1978.

St Patrick's College was later incorporated into Dublin City University (DCU) and some DCU GAA teams have since competed as DCU Dóchas Éireann.

== Honours ==
- Dublin Senior Football Championship winners (4) 1887, 1932, 1956, 1978

== Notable players ==
- Mattie McDonagh (Galway)
- Tom Long (Kerry)
