= 1938 All-Ireland Minor Hurling Championship =

All-Ireland Minor Hurling Championship 1938
All Ireland Champions
- Winners: Cork (3rd win)
- Captain: Kevin McGrath

All Ireland Runners-up
- Runners-up: Dublin
- Captain: Ned Dunphy

Provincial Champions
- Munster: Cork
- Leinster: Dublin
- Ulster: Antrim
- Connacht: Galway

The 1938 All-Ireland Minor Hurling Championship was the 11th staging of the All-Ireland Minor Hurling Championship since its establishment by the Gaelic Athletic Association in 1928.

Cork entered the championship as the defending champions.

The All-Ireland final was played at Croke Park in Dublin on 4 September 1938 between Cork and Dublin, in what was their first successive meeting in the final in 10 years. Cork won the match by 7–02 to 5–04 to claim their third championship title overall and a second title in succession.

== Leinster Minor Hurling Championship ==
=== Leinster first round ===
24 April 1938 First round	Louth	2-2 - 3-2	Meath	Drogheda

=== Leinster quarter-finals ===
1 May 1938 Quarter-final	Meath	1-0 - 8-5	Dublin	Páirc Tailteann

22 May 1938 Quarter-final	Kilkenny	5-6 - 2-3	Wexford	Nowlan Park

=== Leinster semi-finals ===
15 May 1938 Semi-final	Offaly	2-2 - 1-6	Laois	St. Brendan's Park

26 June 1938 Semi-final	Dublin	2-6 - 2-5	Kilkenny	O'Moore Park

=== Leinster final ===
17 July 1938 Final	Dublin	7-2 - 6-4	Laois	O'Moore Park

== Munster Minor Hurling Championship ==
=== Munster quarter-finals ===
22 May 1938 Quarter-final	Cork	7-2 - 6-4	Limerick	Thurles Sportsfield

26 June 1938 Quarter-final	Tipperary	5-5 - 4-2	Clare	Ennis Road

=== Munster semi-final ===
10 July 1938 Semi-final	Cork	9-3 - 0-0	Tipperary	Fraher Field

=== Munster final ===
31 July 1938 Final	Cork	9-3 - 0-0	Kerry	Cork Athletic Grounds

== All-Ireland Minor Hurling Championship ==
=== All-Ireland semi-final ===
7 August 1938 Semi-final	Cork	7-4 - 5-3	Galway	Cusack Park

21 August 1938 Semi-final	Dublin	4-8 - 2-1	Antrim

=== All-Ireland final ===
4 September 1938 Final	Cork	7-2 - 5-4	Dublin	Croke Park
