= Carlow county football team =

Gaelic football team

Carlow
- Sport: Football
- Irish: Ceatharlach
- Nickname(s): The Barrowsiders
- County board: Carlow GAA
- Home venue(s): Dr Cullen Park, Carlow

Recent competitive record
- Current All-Ireland status: Leinster (PR) in 2025
- Last championship title: None
- Current NFL Division: 3 (1st (2026 Division 4 Champions) in 2026)
- Last league title: 2026 (2026)
First colours	Second colours

The Carlow county football team (/ˈkɑːrloʊ/ KAR-loh) represents Carlow in men's Gaelic football and is governed by Carlow GAA, the county board of the Gaelic Athletic Association. The team competes in the three major annual inter-county competitions; the All-Ireland Senior Football Championship, the Leinster Senior Football Championship and the National Football League.

Carlow's home ground is Dr Cullen Park, Carlow.

The team last won the Leinster Senior Championship in 1944, in Athy, but has never won a match in Croke Park or the All-Ireland Senior Championship or the National League.

== History ==
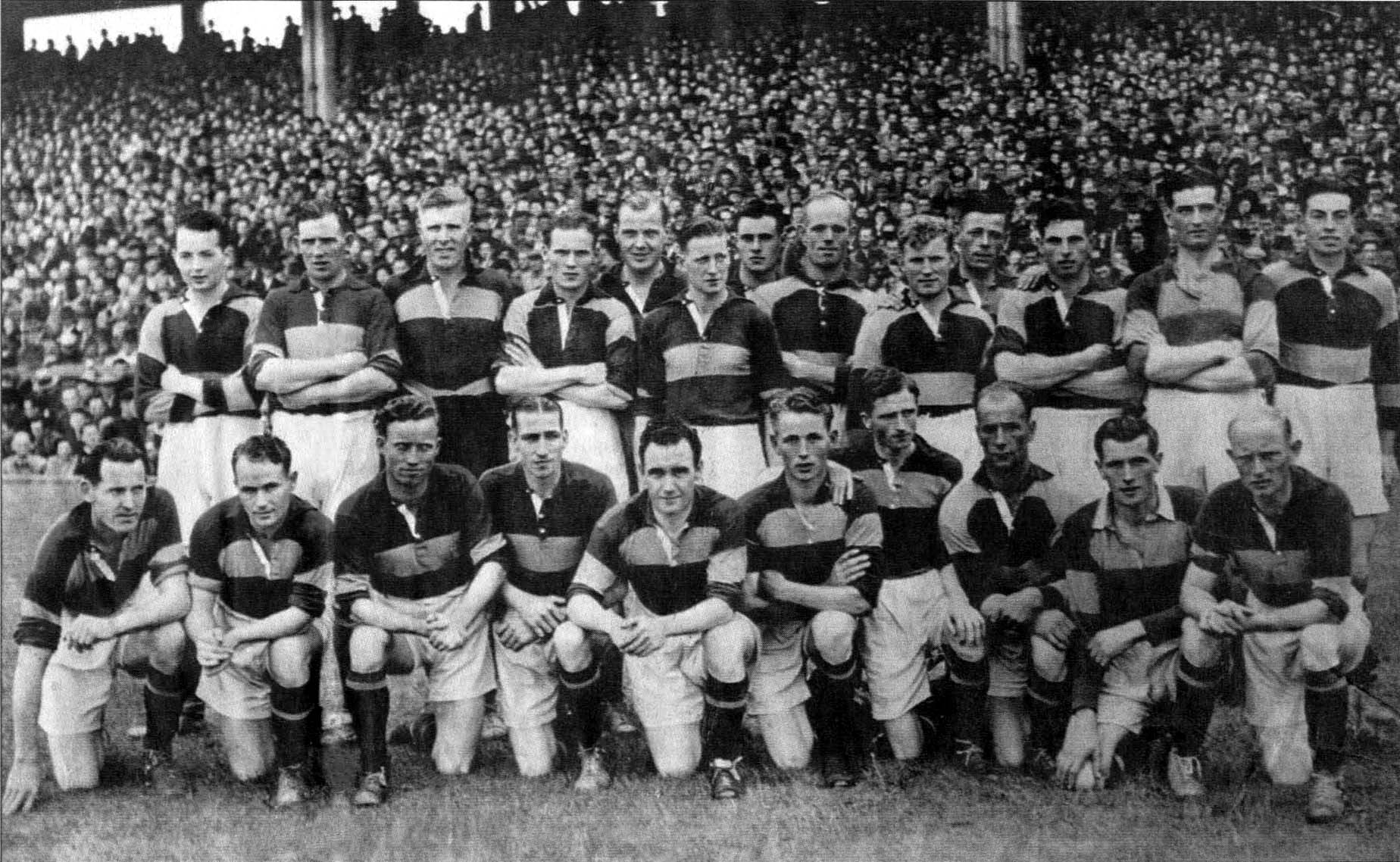
Carlow team of 1944

Carlow have claimed very few honours at senior level. The team won a Leinster Senior Football Championship (SFC) in 1944. The final was played in Athy due to the war and Carlow defeated Dublin by a scoreline of 2–6 to 1–6. Carlow also lost Leinster SFC finals in 1941 and 1942 to the same opposition. Kerry fisherman-publican Paddy Bawn Brosnan kept Carlow from reaching an All-Ireland SFC final in 1944. His second-half goal put Carlow out of the All-Ireland semi-final by a scoreline of 3–3 to 0–10.

Ten years later Carlow reached the National League final with a famous 1–10 to 1–7 win against Armagh, but were well beaten by Mayo in the final.

Carlow won the 1994 All-Ireland B Senior Football Championship, and an O'Byrne Cup in 2002. The team defeated Wicklow by a scoreline of 2–10 to 0–8.

Other significant performances include reaching the Leinster Minor Football Championship final in 2007, when the team lost to Laois. The Carlow Vocational Schools team won the VEC All Ireland Championship in 1973, while Carlow CBS won an All-Ireland B title at Croke Park in 2015. An under-21 team came within a point of defeating Dublin in 1984.

In the 1980–81 National League Carlow once fielded a one-club selection so that Éire Óg could prepare for their first Leinster Club final. Tommy Dwyer, at 6'7, was one of the tallest midfielders in GAA history.

Paul Bealin spent a year as manager.

In late 2012, Anthony Rainbow was appointed manager of the senior county football team.

Carlow played Laois in a first round qualifier in 2013 — the first Friday night game in the history of the All-Ireland Senior Football Championship.

Turlough O'Brien managed Carlow between 2014 and 2020. In the 2018 National Football League, O'Brien led the team out of Division 4. This was their first promotion in more than three decades. In the 2018 Leinster Senior Football Championship, he led Carlow to a quarter-final victory against Kildare at O'Connor Park. He resigned in June 2020.

Also in 2018, Paul Broderick was nominated for an All Star, the first Carlow player to receive a nomination since Colm Hayden in 1994, which was the year Carlow won the All-Ireland Senior B Football Championship.

In August 2020, Niall Carew replaced O'Brien as manager.

In March 2026, Carlow won the National Football League Division 4 final against Longford in a classic extra time thriller 1-24 to 2-18.

== Panel ==
Team as per Carlow vs Longford in the Leinster SFC, 27 June 2021

No.	Player	Position	Club
1	Ciaran Cunningham	Goalkeeper	Bagenalstown Gaels
2	Liam Roberts	Right corner back	Kildavin\Clonegal
3	Shane Redmond	Full back	Tinryland
4	Josh Moore	Left corner back	Rathvilly
5	Jordan Morrissey	Right half back	Éire Óg
6	John Murphy	Centre back	Grange
7	Seanie Bambrick	Left half back	Old Leighlin
8	Sean Gannon (c)	Midfield	Éire Óg
9	Eoghan Ruth	Midfield	Éire Óg
10	Ross Dunphy	Right half forward	Éire Óg
11	Colm Hulton	Centre forward	Éire Óg
12	Jamie Clarke	Left half forward	Bagenalstown Gaels
13	Conor Crowley	Right corner forward	Palatine
14	Paul Broderick	Full forward	Tinryland
15	Darragh Foley	Left corner forward	Kilbride

No.	Player	Position	Club
16	Robbie Molloy	Substitute	Rathvilly
17	Mikey Bambrick	Substitute	Old Leighlin
18	Conor Lawlor	Substitute	Palatine
19	Jordan Lowry	Substitute	Éire Óg
20	Tomas Kenny	Substitute	Palatine
21	Conor Doyle	Substitute	Rathvilly
22	Jason Kane	Substitute	Palatine
23	Shane O'Neill	Substitute	Palatine
24	Chris Blake	Substitute	Éire Óg
25	James McGrath	Substitute	O'Hanrahans
26	Cormac Mullins	Substitute	Éire Óg

^{INJ} Player has had an injury which has affected recent involvement with the county team.
^{RET} Player has since retired from the county team.
^{WD} Player has since withdrawn from the county team due to a non-injury issue.

== Management team ==
- Manager: Niall Carew
- Head coach: Ger Brennan
- Selectors: Darren Leonard, Simon Rea
- Performance coach: Eamonn Callaghan, since August 2022

== Managerial history ==
Carlow have a history of appointing "foreign" managers, including Liam Hayes (Meath), Pat Roe (Laois), Paul Bealin (Dublin), Andy Shortall (Laois) and Bobby Millar (Laois).

Luke Dempsey: 2004, on an interim basis

Luke Dempsey (2) 2009/2010/2011/2012

Dates	Name	Origin
?–?	?	
?–?	Paul Bealin	
2012–?	Anthony Rainbow	
2014?–2020	Turlough O'Brien	
2020–2024	Niall Carew	

== Players ==
=== Records ===
- Paddy Quirke (Naomh Eoin, Myshall) – dual All Star (hurling and football), Railway Cup Hurling and Football
- Tommy Dwyer (Tinryland) – International Rules Football, Railway Cup Football
- Luke Kelly (Leighlinbridge) – Leinster SFC winner 1944
- Jim Morris (Ballon) – Leinster SFC winner 1944
- Jimma Rea (O'Hanrahan's) – Leinster SFC winner 1944
- Simon Rea (Éire Óg) – Railway Cup SF
- Mark Carpenter (O'Hanrahan's) – Railway Cup SF, Leinster Club SF 2000
- Tom "Drakes" Walker (O'Hanrahan's) – Railway Cup SF
- Colm Hayden (Éire Óg) – Railway Cup SF, 5 Leinsters in 1990s with Éire Óg
- Johnny Nevin (Old Leighlin GFC/Naomh Brid HC) - Railway Cup SF, SH, All-Ireland Senior B Football Championship 1994, Carlow Championship 1997, All-Ireland over-40s runner-up 2008
- Andy Murphy (Tinryland) – Railway Cup SF
- "Paks" Connolly (Clonmore) – Railway Cup SF
- Martin Molloy (Clonmore /Rathvilly) – Railway Cup SF
- Luke Dempsey (Ballinabranna) – manager of Westmeath, Longford and Carlow
- Thomas Walshe (Fenagh GFC/Ballinkillen HC) – Railway Cup SF
- Cyril Hughes (St Andrew's, Bagenalstown GFC/Ballinkillen HC) – Railway Cup SF, manager of Carlow and Wexford
- Brendan Murphy (Rathvilly) – Leinster MFC runner-up 2007, professional Australian rules player
- Tommy 'The Boy Wonder' Murphy (Graiguecullen) – Team of the Millennium as Laois player, originally Carlow before the Graiguecullen expulsion
- Brendan Hayden Snr (Tinryland GFC/St Fintan's HC) – Railway Cup SF
- Ned Doogue (O'Hanrahan's) – Railway Cup SF
- Eamonn Long (O'Hanrahan's) – Railway Cup SF
- Cran Hogan (Éire Óg) – Railway Cup SF
- Willie Quinlan (Éire Óg) – Railway Cup SF, All-Ireland Senior B Football Championship 1994
- Andrew Corden (O'Hanrahan's) – O'Byrne Cup 2001
- Peeney Whelan (Tinryland) – Railway Cup SF
- Garvan Ware (Éire Óg) – Railway Cup SF, 5 Leinsters in 1990s with Éire Óg
- Joe Hayden (Éire Óg GFC/Carlow Town HC) – Railway Cup SF, 5 Leinsters in 1990s with Éire Óg
- Richie Moore (Éire Óg GFC/Carlow Town HC) – All-Ireland Senior B Football Championship 1994
- Willie Doyle (O'Hanrahan's) – International Rules 1985
- Hugh Brennan (Éire Óg) – Mayo minor, 5 Leinsters in 1990s with Éire Óg, All-Ireland Senior B Football Championship captain 1994
- Ned Gladney (St Mullins) – All-Ireland and Leinster 1961, 1962, eight county titles, and full forward on Team of the Century. The first man to captain Carlow at senior level.

=== All Stars ===
Carlow has no All Stars.

== Honours ==
=== National ===
- All-Ireland Senior Football Championship
  - Semi-finalists (1): 1944
- All-Ireland Senior B Football Championship
  - (gold) Winners (1): 1994
- Tailteann Cup
  - Quarter-finalists (1): 2022
- National Football League
  - (silver) Runners-up (1): 1953–54
- National Football League Division 2
  - (gold) Winners (1): 1934–35
- National Football League Division 4
  - (gold) Winners (1): 2026
- All-Ireland Vocational Schools Championship
  - (gold) Winners (1): 1973

=== Provincial ===
- Leinster Senior Football Championship
  - (gold) Winners (1): 1944
  - (silver) Runners-up (2): 1941, 1942
- O'Byrne Cup
  - (gold) Winners (1): 2002
- Leinster Junior Football Championship
  - (gold) Winners (3): 1913, 1923, 1933
- Leinster Under-21 Football Championship
  - (silver) Runners-up (1): 1984
- Leinster Minor Football Championship
  - (silver) Runners-up (1): 2007
