= 1939 All-Ireland Minor Hurling Championship =

All-Ireland Minor Hurling Championship 1939
All Ireland Champions
- Winners: Cork (4th win)

All Ireland Runners-up
- Runners-up: Kilkenny

Provincial Champions
- Munster: Cork
- Leinster: Kilkenny
- Ulster: Antrim
- Connacht: Galway

The 1939 All-Ireland Minor Hurling Championship was the 12th staging of the All-Ireland Minor Hurling Championship since its establishment by the Gaelic Athletic Association in 1928.

Cork entered the championship as the defending champions in search of a record-equalling third successive title.

On 3 September 1939 Cork won the championship following a 5–2 to 2–2 defeat of Kilkenny in the All-Ireland final. This was their third All-Ireland title in-a-row and their fourth title overall.

== Results ==
=== All-Ireland Minor Hurling Championship ===
Semi-finals

6 August 1939 Semi-final	Kilkenny	10-2 - 0-1	Galway	St. Cronan's Park, Roscrea

20 August 1939 Semi-final	Cork	9-8 - 1-1	Antrim	Croke Park, Dublin

Final

3 September 1939 Final	Cork	5-2 - 2-2	Kilkenny	Croke Park, Dublin

== Championship statistics ==
=== Miscellaneous ===
- Cork's fourth All-Ireland Championship victory put them as joint record holders at the top of the roll of honour with Tipperary.
