= Carlow GAA =

County board of the Gaelic Athletic Association in Ireland

- Irish: Ceatharlach
- Nickname(s): The Barrowsiders
- Province: Leinster
- Dominant sport: Hurling
- Ground(s): Dr Cullen Park, Carlow
- County colours: Red Gold Green

County teams
- NFL: Division 4
- NHL: Division 1B
- Football Championship: Sam Maguire Cup
- Hurling Championship: Liam MacCarthy Cup
- Ladies' Gaelic football: Brendan Martin Cup
- Camogie: Nancy Murray Cup

The Carlow County Board of the Gaelic Athletic Association (GAA) (Irish: Cumann Luthchleas Gael Coiste Ceatharlach) or Carlow GAA is one of the 32 county boards of the GAA in Ireland, and is responsible for Gaelic games in County Carlow and the Carlow county teams.

The Carlow county football team play in the Leinster Senior Football Championship and in Division 3 of the Allianz Football League for 2019. The Carlow county hurling team compete in the Joe McDonagh Cup, the second tier of the all-Ireland Senior Hurling Championship, and in Division 1B of the National Hurling League in 2019.

== Football ==
=== Clubs ===
Clubs contest the Carlow Senior Football Championship. That competition's most successful club is Éire Óg, with 29 titles.

Carlow clubs have a decent record in the All-Ireland Senior Club Football Championship. Éire Óg has five Leinster titles, while O'Hanrahans has one. Éire Óg was deprived of the All-Ireland club title in 1993 by Cork's O'Donovan Rossa of Skibbereen. The club was defeated by 1-7 to 0-8 after a replay in Limerick, after being controversially denied a winning goal in injury time. The team had to make do with immortality of a different kind; they are seen togged out in 1920-style kit, posing as the Tipperary Bloody Sunday team in Neil Jordan's film Michael Collins, against a Kilmacud Crokes team filling in as Dublin.

=== County team ===
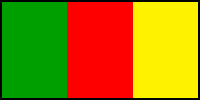
The Carlow Gaelic games colours

The county team won a Leinster Senior Football Championship (SFC) in 1944. The final was played in Athy due to the war and Carlow defeated Dublin by a scoreline of 2–6 to 1–6. Carlow also lost Leinster SFC finals in 1941 and 1942 to the same opposition. Kerry fisherman-publican Paddy Bawn Brosnan kept Carlow from reaching an All-Ireland SFC final in 1944. His second-half goal put Carlow out of the All-Ireland semi-final by a scoreline of 3–3 to 0–10. Ten years later Carlow reached the National League final with a famous 1–10 to 1–7 win against Armagh, but were well beaten by Mayo in the final.

Carlow won the 1994 All-Ireland B Senior Football Championship, and an O'Byrne Cup in 2002. The team defeated Wicklow by a scoreline of 2–10 to 0–8. Other significant performances include reaching the Leinster Minor Football Championship final in 2007, when the team lost to Laois. The Carlow Vocational Schools team won the VEC All Ireland Championship in 1973, while Carlow CBS won an All-Ireland B title at Croke Park in 2015. An under-21 team came within a point of defeating Dublin in 1984.

== Hurling ==
=== Clubs ===
Clubs contest the Carlow Senior Hurling Championship. That competition's most successful club is St Mullin's, with 27 titles.

In 2013, Mount Leinster Rangers shocked the hurling world by winning the Leinster Club Hurling Championship, defeating Ballyboden St Enda's of Dublin in the semi-final and Oulart the Ballagh of Wexford in the final. The following February, the club defeated 2012 champions Loughgiel Shamrocks to reach the All-Ireland final. Portuma defeated Mount Leinster Rangers in that game.

=== County team ===
Carlow have won three Christy Ring Championships. After losing the 2006 final to Antrim at Croke Park, they beat Westmeath in a classic final (after extra time) by 3–22 to 4–16 in 2008. This was their first "Division 2" win since 1992 and their first in the re-arranged All-Ireland structure which saw four divisions in hurling from 2009. They repeated the feat the following year, defeating Down at Croke Park to win a two in a row and earn automatic promotion to tier one for 2010. They played at this level until 2016 which saw them relegated from the Leinster Senior Hurling Championship. The very next year, however, they won the 2017 Christy Ring Cup for a record equalling third time, gaining promotion to the top tier of hurling once again. Carlow's last appearance in a Leinster Senior Hurling Championship semi-final was in 1993, when Kilkenny defeated them by 18 points.

== Camogie ==
Carlow won the Máire Ní Chinnéide Cup in camogie in 2007 and in 2012. They won the Nancy Murray Cup in 2015. They won both the All Ireland Minor C championship and Under-16 C championship in 2010. Naomh Moling won Division 3 at the Féile na nGael in 1991 and Kildavin Division 5 in 1995.

Under Camogie's National Development Plan 2010-2015, "Our Game, Our Passion", Carlow, Cavan, Laois, Louth and Roscommon were to get a total of 17 new clubs by 2015.

Carlow won the Premier Junior Camogie All-Ireland title in 2016, defeating Armagh 4-10 to 2-07.

== Ladies' football ==
Carlow has a ladies' football team.
