= 1934 All-Ireland Senior Football Championship =

Football championship

All-Ireland Champions
- Winning team: Galway (2nd win)
- Captain: Michael Higgins

All-Ireland Finalists
- Losing team: Dublin

Provincial Champions
- Munster: Kerry
- Leinster: Dublin
- Ulster: Cavan
- Connacht: Galway

Championship statistics

The 1934 All-Ireland Senior Football Championship was the 48th staging of Ireland's premier Gaelic football knock-out competition. Galway won they ended Cavan's campaign in the All Ireland semi-final.

== Golden Jubilee ==
The All-Ireland Senior Football Championship 1934 marked the fiftieth anniversary of the foundation of the Gaelic Athletic Association.

== Results ==
=== Connacht Senior Football Championship ===
17 June 1934
Semi-Final

Galway	2–7 – 0–4	Roscommon

Castlerea
Attendance: 3,000

8 July 1934
Semi-Final

Mayo	3–7 – 1–3	Sligo
P Flannelly (0–1), J Carney (0–4), P Laffey (1–0); P Conboy (1–1), P Moclair (1–2).

Tubbercurry

22 July 1934
Final

Galway	2–4 – 0–5	Mayo
		J Carney (0–3), H Kenny (0–1) & P Moclair (0–1).

Castlerea
Attendance: 16,000

=== Leinster Senior Football Championship ===
6 May 1934
Preliminary Round

Louth	2–5 – 1–6	Laois

Croke Park, Dublin

20 May 1934
Preliminary Round

Offaly	3–13 – 0–6	Carlow

Geraldine Park, Athy
Attendance: 2000
Referee: P Waters (Kildare)

27 May 1934
Quarter-Final

Wexford	1–5 – 0–6	Kildare
		P.Byrne 0–3, T.Keogh, J.Higgins, J.Fox 0–1.

Nowlan Park, Kilkenny

3 June 1934
Quarter-Final

Dublin	2–10 – 0–4	Westmeath

Kells

10 June 1934
Quarter-Final

Meath	2–13 – 2–6	Offaly

St. Conleth's Park, Newbridge
Referee: J Higgins (Kildare)

1 July 1934
Semi-Final

Louth	3–5 – 1–1	Wexford

Croke Park, Dublin

8 July 1934
Semi-Final

Dublin	2–8 – 2–9	Meath

Drogheda Park, Drogheda

29 July 1934
Final

Dublin	1–2 – 0–5	Louth
J. Colleran 1–0, Gerry Fitzgerald (0-1f) and Murt Kelly (0-1f) 0–1 each		Tom Caffrey 0–3 (0-1f), Jimmy Coyle and Sean Cullen 0–1 each

Croke Park, Dublin
Attendance: 12,000
Referee: Jack Higgins (Kildare)

5 August 1934
Final Replay

Dublin	3–2 – 2–5 (AET)	Louth
Murt Kelly 1–1 (0-1f) J. Colleran and Mick Keating 1–0 each, Ned McCann 0–1 (1 '50)		Tom Caffrey 1–3 (0-1f) and Sean Cullen 1–2

Croke Park, Dublin
Referee: Jack Higgins (Kildare)

==== Final (2nd Replay) ====
19 August 1934

Dublin	2–9 – 1–10	Louth
Colleran 2–0, Comerford 0–5 (0-3f), Wellington 0–3, Beggs 0–1		Caffrey 0–6 (0-3f), McKeown 1–0, Callan (0-1f), Coyle, Keogh, Cullen (0-1f) 0–1 each

Gaelic Grounds, Drogheda
Attendance: 25,000
Referee: Sean Robbins (Offaly)

GK	1	Johnny McDonnell (O'Toole's)
RCB	2	Séamus O'Shea (Geraldines)
FB	3	Mick Casey (UCD)
LCB	4	Dessie Brennan (C.J. Kickhams)
RHB	5	Paddy Hickey (Round Towers, Clondalkin)
CHB	6	Ned McCann (Geraldines)
LHB	7	Paddy Cavanagh (Dolphins)
MF	8	Bobby Beggs (St Joseph's)
MF	9	Gerry Fitzgerald (Geraldines)
RHF	10	George Comerford (Garda)
CHF	11	Billy Dowling (Round Towers, Clondalkin)
LHF	12	Mick O'Brien (O'Toole's)
RCF	13	Mick Wellington (St Joseph's)
FF	14	Joe Colleran (Clanna Gael)
LCF	15	Mick Keating (Garda) (c)

GK	1	Jim Murphy (Cooley Kickhams)
RCB	2	Michael McKeown (Wolfe Tones)
FB	3	Eddie Boyle (Cooley Kickhams)
LCB	4	Joe Hearty (Clan na Gael)
RHB	5	Jimmy Kelly (Glyde Rangers)
CHB	6	Eugene Callan (Glyde Rangers)
LHB	7	Paddy Cluskey (Darver Young Irelands)
MF	8	Jim Culligan (Newtown Blues)
MF	9	Jimmy Coyle (Glyde Rangers)
RHF	10	Gerry Keogh (Newtown Blues)
CHF	11	Tom Caffrey (Newtown Blues)
LHF	12	Jem Moonan (Newtown Blues) (c)
RCF	13	Paddy McKeown (Wolfe Tones)
FF	14	Seán Cullen (Cooley Kickhams)
LCF	15	Seán Taaffe (Glyde Rangers)

=== Munster Senior Football Championship ===
27 May 1934
Quarter-Final

Kerry	2–6 – 0–3	Cork
Charlie O'Sullivan (1–2) & Jackie Ryan (0–2).		M. Duggan, J. O'Regan & D. O'Keffe (0–1) each.

Páirc MacGearailt, Fermoy

3 June 1934
Quarter-Final

Tipperary	2–11 – 2–2	Clare

Seán Tracey Park, Tipperary
Referee: W. Hough (L)

24 June 1934
Semi-Final

Limerick	4–7 – 1–6	Waterford

Ned Hall Park, Clonmel

15 July 1934
Semi-Final

Kerry	2–8 – 0–12	Tipperary
Paul Russell (0–1), Con Geaney (0–1), Miko Doyle (0–1), Maurice McKenna (1–1) & Jackie Ryan (1–4).

Ned Hall Park, Clonmel
Referee: W. Hough (L)

29 July 1934
Final

Kerry	1–14 – 1–2	Limerick
Willie Brick (1–2), Charlie O'Sullivan (0–1), John Joe Landers (0–4) & Jackie Ryan (0–7).

Frank Sheehy Park, Listowel

=== Ulster Senior Football Championship ===
29 April 1934
Quarter-Final

Cavan	2–5 – 2–4	Tyrone

Omagh

3 June 1934
Quarter-Final

Monaghan	4–7 – 2–6	Down

Pairc Esler, Newry

3 June 1934
Quarter-Final

Antrim	0–5 – 0–12	Armagh

Corrigan Park, Belfast

3 June 1934
Quarter-Final

Fermanagh	2–5 – 1–3	Donegal

Straleel, Carrick
Attendance: 3,000

10 June 1934
Semi-Final

Armagh	2–3 – 1–3	Monaghan

Athletic Grounds, Armagh

15 July 1934
Semi-Final

Fermanagh	1–3 – 3–4	Cavan

Belturbet

29 July 1934
Final

Cavan	3–8 – 0–2	Armagh

St. Mary's Park, Castleblayney

=== All-Ireland Senior Football Championship ===
12 August 1934
Semi-Final

Galway	1–8 – 1–4	Cavan

Tuam

9 September 1934
Semi-Final

Dublin	3–8 – 0–6	Kerry
		Paul Russell (0–1), Miko Doyle (0–1), Martin Regan (0–1) & Jackie Ryan (0–3).

Tralee

23 September 1934
Final

Galway	3–5 – 1–9	Dublin

Croke Park, Dublin
Attendance: 36,143
Referee: Sean McCarthy (Kerry)

== Championship statistics ==
=== Miscellaneous ===
- The Magherafelt fields became known as Rossa Park.
- The Tullamore Grounds become known as O'Connor Park.
- Galway win their second All Ireland title the Connacht championship became seeded this year until 1940 not allowing Galway and Mayo meet before a Connacht final.
