= 1938 All-Ireland Senior Football Championship =

Football championship

All-Ireland Champions
- Winning team: Galway (3rd win)
- Captain: John "Tull" Dunne. (St Grellan's, Ballinasloe)

All-Ireland Finalists
- Losing team: Kerry
- Captain: Bill Kinnerk

Provincial Champions
- Munster: Kerry
- Leinster: Laois
- Ulster: Monaghan
- Connacht: Galway

Championship statistics

The 1938 All-Ireland Senior Football Championship was the 52nd staging of Ireland's premier Gaelic football knock-out competition. Galway won their third title ending Kerry's year.

== Format ==
The All-Ireland Senior Football Championship was run on a provincial basis as usual, with a rotation system of every 3rd season from this year onwards meaning for with the four winners from Connacht, Leinster, Munster and Ulster advancing to the All-Ireland semi-finals. The draw for these games was as follows:

- Connacht V. Ulster
- Munster V. Leinster

== Results ==
=== Connacht Senior Football Championship ===
19 June 1938
Semi-Final

Galway	3–11 – 2–3	Sligo

Tuam

17 July 1938
Final

Galway	0–8 – 0–5	Mayo
		P Flannelly (0–4, three frees) & P Moclair (0–1).

St. Coman's Park, Roscommon
Attendance: 20,000

=== Leinster Senior Football Championship ===
1 May 1938
Preliminary Round

Louth	2–4 – 0–3	Westmeath

Páirc Tailteann, Navan

8 May 1938
Preliminary Round

Carlow	2–5 – 2–5	Wicklow

Enniscorthy

22 May 1938
Preliminary Round

Offaly	1–7 – 2–4	Wexford

Nolan Park, Kilkenny
Referee: M Hennessy (Dublin)

5 June 1938
Preliminary Round Replay

Carlow	5–9 – 1–7	Wicklow

Naas

12 June 1938
Preliminary Round Replay

Offaly	1–9 – 1–5	Wexford

Dr. Cullen Park, Carlow
Referee: M Hennessy (Dublin)

29 May 1938
Quarter-Final

Kildare	4–7 – 3–5	Dublin
P.Geoghegan 2–0, J.Martin 1–3, M.Geraghty 0–2, P.Waters, G.Comerford 0–1 (1–0 was a forward scramble).

O'Moore Park, Portlaoise

3 July 1938
Quarter-Final

Laois	2–5 – 2–2	Louth

Croke Park, Dublin

3 July 1938
Quarter-Final

Meath	4–4 – 2–7	Carlow

Croke Park, Dublin

10 July 1938
Quarter-Final

Offaly	2–4 – 0–8	Longford

Cusack Park, Mullingar
Attendance: 8000
Referee: Seamus Burke (Kildare)

10 July 1938
Semi-Final

Laois	4–6 – 2–3	Meath

Croke Park, Dublin

24 July 1938
Semi-Final

Offaly	0–6 – 4–8	Kildare
		M.Geraghty, P.O'Brien, P.Geoghegan 1–1, W.Ryan 1–0, T.Mulhall 0–2, G.Comerford, C.Higgins 0–1.

Dr. Cullen Park, Carlow
Referee: C Nolan

7 August 1938
Final

Laois	2–8 – 1–3	Kildare
Chris Delaney 0–4 (0-3f), Ned Begley and Jack McDarby 1–0 each, Danny Douglas and Mick Haughney 0–2 each		Tom Mulhall 1–1, P. Geoghegan and Joe Martin (0-1f) 0–1 each

Croke Park, Dublin
Attendance: 17,979
Referee: Dave Hamilton (Dublin)

=== Munster Senior Football Championship ===
29 May 1938
Quarter-Final

Kerry	2–6 – 0–1	Clare
Johnny Walsh (1–1), Eugene Powell (0–1), Murt Kelly (1–3) & Martin Regan (0–1).

Cusack Park, Ennis

12 June 1938
Quarter-Final

Tipperary	1–10 – 1–8	Waterford

Fraher Field, Dungarvan
Referee: D. Ryan (Kerry)

29 May 1938
Semi-Final

Cork	2–7 – 2–3	Limerick
R. Kiely (0–1), F. Healy (1–2), A. Ricken (0–1) & T. O’Reilly (1–2).

Seán Treacy Park, Tipperary

3 July 1938
Semi-Final

Kerry	2–6 – 1–3	Tipperary
Charlie O'Sullivan (0–2), Eugene Powell (0–2), Con Geaney (0–1), Tom Gega O'Connor (1–0), Martin Regan (1–0) & Sub Tim O'Leary (0–1).

Mitchelstown
Referee: T. Greaney (W)

7 August 1938
Final

Kerry	4–14 – 0–6	Cork
S. Brosnan (0–2), P. Kennedy (1–1), C. O'Sullivan (0–1), T. McAuliffe (1–1), M. Regan (0–4), M. Doyle (2–1) & T. O'Leary (0–4).		M. O’Connor & P. Harrington (0–2) each.

Clonakilty

=== Ulster Senior Football Championship ===
19 June 1938
Quarter-Final

Armagh	2–5 – 1–4	Antrim

Corrigan Park, Belfast

19 June 1938
Quarter-Final

Monaghan	3–3 – 0–6	Tyrone

Omagh

3 July 1938
Quarter-Final

Cavan	3–10 – 1–4	Fermanagh

Belturbet

10 July 1938
Semi-Final

Monaghan	0–7 – 0–6	Donegal

Carndonagh

17 July 1938
Semi-Final

Cavan	1–4 – 2–7	Armagh

Athletic Grounds, Armagh
Attendance: 8,000

31 July 1938
Final

Monaghan	2–5 – 2–2	Armagh

Athletic Grounds, Armagh

=== All-Ireland Senior Football Championship ===
14 August 1938
Semi-Final

Galway	2–10 – 2–3	Monaghan

Cusack Park, Mullingar

21 August 1936
Semi-Final

Kerry	2–6 – 2–4	Laois
Tony McAuliffe (0–2), Charlie O'Sullivan (1–1), Paddy Kennedy (0–1), Murt Kelly (1–1) & John Joe Landers (0–1).

Croke Park, Dublin

25 September 1938
Final

Galway	3–3 – 2–6	Kerry
B. Nestor (1-1), N. Mulholland & R. Griffin (1-0), J. Flavin & M. Kelly (0-1) each.		Sean Brosnan, Paddy Kennedy & Tony McAuliffe (0–1) each, John Joe Landers (1–0), Miko Doyle (0–2) & Tim O'Leary (1–1).

Croke Park, Dublin
Attendance: 68,950
Referee: P. Maguire (Cavan)

23 October 1938
Final Replay

Galway	2–4 – 0–7	Kerry
B. Nestor (0-4), R. Griffin & J. Burke (0-2) each.		Sean Brosnan (0–3), Charlie O'Sullivan (0–1) & Miko Doyle (0–3).

Croke Park, Dublin
Attendance: 47,851
Referee: Peter Waters (Kildare)

== Championship statistics ==
=== Miscellaneous ===
- The Preliminary Round of the Leinster football championship saw 2 draws and replays, They were the matches between Carlow vs Wicklow and Offaly vs Wexford.
- Laois become the last team until Offaly (1971–1973) to complete a triple of Leinster titles.
- The All Ireland semi finals become Rotation of every 3 years from this years on words between the champions of each province.
- The All-Ireland final for the only time in history ends in a draw and goes to a replay for the 2nd year in a row.

== Roll of Honour ==
- Dublin – 14 (1923)
- Kerry – 12 (1937)
- Wexford – 5 (1918)
- Kildare – 4 (1928)
- Tipperary – 4 (1920)
- Galway – 3 (1938)
- Cavan – 2 (1935)
- Limerick – 2 (1896)
- Cork – 2 (1911)
- Louth – 2 (1912)
- Mayo – 1 (1936)
