= 1939–40 National Football League (Ireland) =

Gaelic football competition

League details
- Dates: 1939 – 1940

League champions
- Winners: Galway (1st win)
- Captain: John Dunne

League runners-up
- Runners-up: Meath
- Captain: Matt Gilsenan

The 1939–40 National Football League was the 13th staging of the National Football League, an annual Gaelic football tournament for the Gaelic Athletic Association county teams of Ireland.

After winning six NFL titles in a row, Mayo did not play in the league this season, on the grounds that petrol rationing (due to The Emergency / Second World War) would make playing in the NFL prohibitively expensive. They were also protesting events during the 1939 All-Ireland semi-final replay. In their absence, Galway won the League.

== Format ==
There were four divisions – Northern, Southern, Eastern and Western. Division winners played off for the NFL title.

=== Knockout stage qualifiers ===
- The winners of Division A, B and C each progressed to the semi-Finals.
- The Winners of Divisions D, E, F and G each contested the inter-group play-offs for the fourth semi-final place.

== Results ==
=== Group A ===
==== Results ====
29 October 1939 Round 1	Kerry	3-4 — 1-3	Offaly	Listowel

29 October 1939 Round 1	Laois	3-8 — 4-5	Galway	Portlaoise

12 November 1939 Round 2	Laois	2-4 — 1-6	Kerry	Portlaoise

12 November 1939 Round 2	Galway	2-6 — 0-7	Offaly	Ballinasloe

3 March 1940 Round 3	Galway	2-8 — 3-5	Kerry	Galway

==== Table ====
Team	Pld	W	D	L	Pts	Status
Galway	3	2	2	0	4	Qualified for knockout phase
Laois	3	1	1	1	3
Kerry	3	1	1	1	3
Offaly	3	1	0	2	2

=== Group B ===
Wexford finished top, ahead of Carlow, Waterford and Tipperary.

=== Group C ===
Meath finished top, ahead of Dublin, Louth and Monaghan.

=== Group D ===
==== Table ====
Team	Pld	W	D	L	Pts	Status
Sligo	2	1	0	1	2	Qualified for knockout phase
Donegal	2	1	0	1	2
Leitrim	2	1	0	1	2

=== Group E ===
==== Table ====
Team	Pld	W	D	L	Pts	Status
Roscommon	2	2	0	0	4	Qualified for knockout phase
Longford	2	1	0	1	2
Westmeath	2	0	0	2	0

=== Group F ===
==== Table ====
Team	Pld	W	D	L	Pts	Status
Derry	2	2	0	0	4	Qualified for knockout phase
Tyrone	2	0	0	2	0

=== Group G ===
Cork finished top, ahead of Clare and Limerick.

== Knockout phase ==
=== Inter-group play-offs ===
10 March 1940
Inter-group Play-Off Semi-Final

Roscommon	0-10 – 2-2	Cork

Castlerea

17 March 1940
Inter-group Play-Off Semi-Final

Sligo	1-9 – 1-2	Derry

Sligo

31 March 1940
Inter-group Play-Off Final

Roscommon	3-5 – 0-4	Sligo

Boyle

=== Semi-finals ===
14 April 1940
Semi-Final

Galway	1-7 – 0-7	Roscommon

Galway

14 April 1940
Semi-Final

Meath	2-8 – 0-4	Wexford

Navan

=== Final ===
28 April 1940
Final

Galway	2-5 – 1-5	Meath

Croke Park, Dublin
