= 1945 Cork Senior Football Championship =

Gaelic football competition

- Dates: 6 May – 21 October 1945
- Teams: 15
- Champions: Fermoy (7th title); Paddy Cronin (captain)
- Runners-up: Clonakilty; Dessie Cullinane (captain)

Tournament statistics
- Matches played: 16
- Goals scored: 35 (2.19 per match)
- Points scored: 146 (9.13 per match)

The 1945 Cork Senior Football Championship was the 57th staging of the Cork Senior Football Championship since its establishment by the Cork County Board in 1887. The draw for the first round fixtures took place on 28 January 1945. The championship ran from 6 May to 21 October 1945.

Clonakilty were the defending champions.

The final was played on 21 October 1945 at the Athletic Grounds in Cork, between Fermoy and Clonakilty, in what was their fourth consecutive meeting in the final. Fermoy won the match by 0–06 to 0–04 to claim their seventh championship title overall and a first title in 39 years.

== Group 1 ==
=== First round ===
6 May 1945 First round	Carbery	1-01 - 2-06	Clonakilty	Skibbereen Grounds

- Beara received a bye in this round.

=== Second round ===
10 June 1945 Second round	Beara	1-02 - 1-04	Clonakilty	Glengarriff Grounds

== Group 2 ==
=== First round ===
27 May 1945 First round	Muskerry	1-04 - 2-05	Millstreet	Macroom Grounds

17 June 1945 First round	Kilmurry	1-05 - 0-05	Duhallow	Millstreet Grounds

=== Second round ===
29 July 1945 Second round	Kilmurry	0-05 - 0-05	Millstreet	Macroom Grounds

19 August 1945 Second round replay	Kilmurry	1-00 - 1-05	Millstreet	Macroom Grounds

== Group 3 ==
=== First round ===
13 May 1945 First round	Seandún	1-03 - 1-04	St Finbarr's	The Mardyke

27 May 1945 First round	St Nicholas'	2-04 - 2-02	Army	The Mardyke

27 May 1945 First round	Glanmire	1-02 - 2-08	Commercials	The Mardyke

20 MAy 1945 First round	Fermoy	1-08 - 0-03	21st Battalion	The Mardyke

=== Second round ===
29 July 1945 Second round	Fermoy	2-05 - 2-03	Commercials	The Mardyke

5 August 1945 Second round	St Finbarr's	0-07 - 1-04	St Nicholas'	Cork Athletic Grounds

26 August 1945 Second round replay	St Finbarr's	2-03 - 2-07	St Nicholas'	The Mardyke

=== Third round ===
2 September 1945 Third round	Fermoy	2-07 - 1-07	St Nicholas'	Páirc Mac Gearailt

== Knockout stage ==
=== Semi-final ===
2 September 1945 Semi-final	Clonakilty	2-09 - 0-04	Millstreet	Macroom Grounds

- Fermoy received a bye in this round.

=== Final ===
21 October 1945 Final	Fermoy	0-06 - 0-03	Clonakilty	Cork Athletic Grounds
				Referee: S Deignan
