= 1942 All-Ireland Senior Football Championship =

Football championship

All-Ireland Champions
- Winning team: Dublin (15th win)
- Captain: Joe Fitzgerald

All-Ireland Finalists
- Losing team: Galway
- Captain: Charlie Connolly

Provincial Champions
- Munster: Kerry
- Leinster: Dublin
- Ulster: Cavan
- Connacht: Galway

Championship statistics

The 1942 All-Ireland Senior Football Championship was the 56th staging of Ireland's premier Gaelic football knock-out competition. Kerry entered the championship as the defending champions, however, they were defeated by Galway in the All-Ireland semi-final. Dublin won their fifteenth title, drawing level with Kerry in the all-time standings until 1946.

== Munster Championship format change ==
Normal system in place but Limerick still refuse to take part for 1 more year.

== Results ==
=== Connacht Senior Football Championship ===
14 June 1942
Quarter-Final

Roscommon	1–8 – 0–8	Mayo
		T Hoban (0–4), H Kenny (0–3), J Munnelly (0–1).

Tuam

21 June 1942
Semi-Final

Galway	4–9 – 1–2	Leitrim

St Manchans GAA Park, Mohill

28 June 1942
Semi-Final

Roscommon	0–14 – 0–6	Sligo

Boyle

19 July 1942
Final

Galway	2–6 – 3–2	Roscommon

Dunlo GAA Grounds, Ballinasloe
Attendance: 9,000

=== Leinster Senior Football Championship ===
26 April 1942
Preliminary Round

Longford	0–4 – 0–3	Westmeath

Pearse Park, Longford

3 May 1942
Preliminary Round

Meath	2–11 – 0–8	Louth

Páirc Tailteann, Navan

10 May 1942
Preliminary Round

Offaly	1–6 – 0–7	Kildare
		P.Waters 0–4, W.Hannify, R.O'Hara, J.Martin 0–1.

St. Conleth's Park, Newbridge
Referee: J Hayden

1942
Quarter-Final

Carlow	0–10 – 0–7	Wexford

Nowlan Park, Kilkenny

10 May 1942
Quarter-Final

Dublin	0–7 – 0–7	Longford

Cusack Park, Mullingar

24 May 1942
Quarter-Final

Offaly	6–5 – 2–7	Laois

O'Moore Park, Portlaoise

24 May 1942
Quarter-Final Replay

Dublin	2–15 – 1–3	Longford

Croke Park, Dublin

31 May 1942
Semi-Final

Dublin	3–5 – 1–10	Meath
Sean McCarthy 1–1, Tommy Banks 0-4f, Paddy O'Connor and M Quigley 1–0 each		Jackie Maye 0–7 (0-6f), Billy Brien 1–0, S Ludlow 0–2, J Hand 0–1

Drogheda Park, Drogheda

14 June 1942
Semi-Final

Offaly	1–10 – 0–13	Carlow

Geraldine Park, Athy
Referee: T Kehoe (Wexford)

21 June 1942
Semi-Final Replay

Offaly	0–6 – 1–9	Carlow

O'Moore Park, Portlaoise

19 July 1942
Final

Dublin	0–8 – 0–6	Carlow
Tommy Banks 0-4f, Jimmy Joy, Gerry Fitzgerald, Brendan Quinn, Paddy O'Connor 0–1 each		Jimma Rea, Tom Walker, Johnny Doyle (0-2f) 0–2 each

Geraldine Park, Athy
Referee: Peter Waters (Kildare)

=== Munster Senior Football Championship ===
14 June 1942
Quarter-Final

Kerry	3–8 – 1–3	Clare
Bill Dillon (1–1).

Cusack Park, Ennis

14 June 1942
Semi-Final

Cork	1–8 – 0–2	Waterford
J. Kenny (0–3), R. Harnedy (0–1), M. Corcarn (1–0), E. Reilly, T. O'Reilly & D. Burke (0–1) each.

Fraher Field, Dungarvan

28 June 1942
Semi-Final

Kerry	3–6 – 1–5	Tipperary
Paddy Kennedy (0–1), Johnny Walsh (0–1), Willie O'Donnell (1–1), Jimmy Gawksie O'Gorman (2–1) & Murt Kelly (0–2).

Seán Tracey Park, Tipperary
Referee: P. McKenna (Limerick)

19 July 1942
Final

Kerry	3–7 – 0–8	Cork
Tom Gega O'Connor (0–1), Jimmy Gawksie O'Gorman (1–3), Murt Kelly (1–3) & Paddy Bawn Brosnan (1–0).		J. Kenny (0–5), D. Burke (0–1) & J. Young (0–2).

Tralee

=== Ulster Senior Football Championship ===
31 May 1942
Quarter-Final

Armagh	3–4 – 0–0	Tyrone

Athletic Grounds, Armagh

14 June 1942
Quarter-Final

Down	4–4 – 3–7	Antrim

St. Patrick's Park, Newcastle

14 June 1942
Quarter-Final

Cavan	1–4 – 0–6	Monaghan

St. Mary's Park, Castleblayney

21 June 1942
Quarter-Final Replay

Down	2–11 – 1–5	Antrim

Corrigan Park, Belfast

28 June 1942
Semi-Final

Cavan	7–10 – 4–4	Donegal

Breffni Park, Cavan

5 July 1942
Semi-Final

Down	0–7 – 0–6	Armagh

St. Patrick's Park, Newcastle

An objection was made and a replay ordered.

12 July 1942
Semi-Final Replay

Down	1–12 – 2–5	Armagh

St. Patrick's Park, Newcastle

19 July 1942
Final

Cavan	5–11 – 1–3	Down

Dundalk
Attendance: 7,000

=== All-Ireland Senior Football Championship ===
2 August 1942
Semi-Final

Dublin	1–6 – 1–3	Cavan

Croke Park, Dublin
Attendance: 8,059

19 August 1942
Semi-Final

Galway	1–3 – 0–3	Kerry
		Murt Kelly (0–3).

Croke Park, Dublin
Attendance: 20,420

20 September 1942
Final

Dublin	1–10 – 1–8	Galway
T. Banks (0–6), P. O'Connor (1–1), J. Joy (0–2) & M. Fletcher (0–1).		S. Thronaton (0–4), J. Casey (1–0), M. Fallon (0–2) P. Thornton & J. Flavin (0–1).

Croke Park, Dublin
Attendance: 37,105
Referee: Sean Kennedy (Donegal)

== Championship statistics ==
=== Miscellaneous ===
- Leitrim return to Connacht championship for the first time since 1933.
- The All Ireland final between Galway and Dublin gave Dublin won their first All Ireland title since 1923, ending their longest drought of 19 years. They were the first champions from Leinster since Kildare in 1928. Galway lost their third All Ireland final in a row. The scoreline was repeated 41 years later in the 1983 All Ireland final.
