= 1945 All-Ireland Senior Football Championship =

Football championship

Championship details
- Dates: 29 April – 23 September 1945
- Teams: 31

All-Ireland Champions
- Winning team: Cork (3rd win)
- Captain: Tadhgo Crowley

All-Ireland Finalists
- Losing team: Cavan
- Captain: Tom O'Reilly

Provincial Champions
- Munster: Cork
- Leinster: Wexford
- Ulster: Cavan
- Connacht: Galway

Championship statistics
- No. matches played: 31

The 1945 All-Ireland Senior Football Championship was the 59th staging of the All-Ireland Senior Football Championship, the Gaelic Athletic Association's premier inter-county Gaelic football tournament. It was played at venues all over Ireland from 29 April to 23 September 1945.

31 teams entered, with Kilkenny once again declining to field a team. Roscommon were the defending champions, however, they surrendered their title in their opening game, a Connacht semi-final defeat by Mayo.

The All-Ireland final was played on 23 September 1945 at Croke Park in Dublin, between Cork and Cavan, in what was their first ever meeting in a final. Cork won the match by 2–05 to 0–07 to claim their third championship title overall and a first title since 1911.

== Results ==
=== Connacht Senior Football Championship ===
Quarter-final

10 June 1945 Quarter-final	Mayo	3–12 – 0–06	Leitrim	Castlerea
	J Mulvey 2–4, T Hoban 1–3, J Kilroy 0–4, E Mongey 0–1.		Kelleher 0–3, Kilkenny 0–2, Doorican 0–1.

Semi-finals

24 June 1945 Semi-final	Galway	2–07 – 1–05	Sligo	St. Coman's Park, Roscommon
	P Thornton 1–1, Canavan 1–0, McManus 0–3, Connolly 0–1, T Sullivan 0–1, S Thornton 0–1.		Mullarkey 1–3, Lavin 0–2.

8 July 1945 Semi-final	Mayo	2–08 – 1–06	Roscommon	Sligo
	J Kilroy 0–4, H Kenny 1–0, J Mulvey 1–0, T Hoban 0–2, J Munnelly 0–1, P Kilroy 0–1.		Boland 1–0, McQuillan 0–1, Fallon 0–1, J Murray 0–1, Keenan 0–1, Kinlough 0–1, P Murray 0–1.

Final

22 July 1945 Final	Galway	2–06 – 1–07	Mayo	St. Coman's Park, Roscommon
	P Thornton 1–1, S Thornton 1–1, P McManus 0–4,		P Kilroy 0–4, Mongey 1–0, Hoban 0–1, JJ McGowan 0–1, J Kilroy 0–1.	Attendance: 8,800

=== Leinster Senior Football Championship ===
Preliminary round

29 April 1945 Preliminary round	Longford	1–05 – 1–05	Westmeath	Cusack Park, Mullingar

6 May 1945 Preliminary round replay	Longford	1-10– 2–06	Westmeath	Pearse Park, Longford

6 May 1945 Preliminary round	Kildare	2-13– 2–10	Carlow	Dr. Cullen Park, Carlow
	P.O'Brien, J.Winders 1–0, M.Byrne (2f) 0–2, J.Farrell, A.Burke 0–1

6 May 1945 Preliminary round	Meath	2-09– 2–07	Louth	Páirc Tailteann, Navan

Quarter-finals

27 May 1945 Quarter-final	Wexford	5–05 – 0–06	Kildare	Dr. Cullen Park, Carlow
	J O'Connor 2–0, D O'Neill 1–1, Somers 1–1, J Nolan 1–0, Goodison 0–2, P Kehoe 0–1.		Byrne 0–2, Collins 0–2, White 0–2.

10 June 1945 Quarter-final	Longford	1–06 – 3–04	Offaly	Cusack Park, Mullingar
				Referee: J Dowling (Kildare)

10 June 1945 Quarter-final	Meath	3–6 – 4–3	Dublin	Drogheda Park, Drogheda
	Frankie Byrne 1-4f, Bill Halpenny 1–1, S Ludlow 1–0, Peter McDermott 0–1		Mick Culhane 2–0, Shay Gibbons 1–2, T Markey 1–0, Paddy Bermingham 0–1	Attendance: 10,000

17 June 1945 Quarter-final replay	Meath	2–16 – 1–10	Dublin	Croke Park, Dublin
	W Snow 2–2, Frankie Byrne 0–7 (0-6f), Paddy Meegan 0–3, Bill Halpenny 0–2, Jackie Maye and S Ludlow 0–1 each		J Gibbons 1–2, Murt Kelly 0–4 (0-3f), Mick Culhane 0–2, T Markey and Matt Fletcher 0–1 each	Attendance: 20,196

Semi-finals

24 June 1945 Semi-final	Meath	0–05 – 1–08	Offaly	O'Moore Park, Portlaoise
				Attendance: 6000; Referee: PJ Sheehy (Offaly)

1 July 1945 Semi-final	Wexford	4–05 – 1–11	Laois	Nowlan Park, Kilkenny
	N Rackard 2–2, D O'Neill 1–1, J Nolan 1–0, P Kehoe 0–2.		Hunt 0–5, Nurney 1–0, M Delaney 0–2, Murphy 0–1, C Delaney 0–1, Haughney 0–1, Fannin 0–1.	Referee: 11,939

Final

22 July 1945 Final	Wexford	1–9 – 1–4	Offaly	O'Moore Park, Portlaoise
	Paddy Keohoe 0-5f, John O'Connor 1–0, Des O'Neill 0–2, Joe Nolan and Nicky Rackard 0–1 each		Jackie Byrne 1–1, Joe O'Connor, W Leonard, H Burke (0-1f) 0–1 each	Attendance: 9,873; Referee: Mick Leech (Louth)

=== Munster Senior Football Championship ===
Quarter-finals

13 May 1945 Quarter-final	Tipperary	0–07 – 0–03	Waterford	Páirc Daibhín, Carrick-on-Suir
				Referee: A Scannell (Cork)

20 May 1945 Quarter-final	Limerick	6–02 – 3–03	Clare	Cusack Park, Ennis

Semi-finals

10 June 1945 Semi-final	Kerry	5–08 – 2–07	Limerick	Gaelic Grounds, Limerick
	P Kennedy 2–4, E Dunne 1–1, W O'Donnell 1–1, D Kavanagh 1–1, B Garvey 0–1.

24 June 1945 Semi-final	Cork	1–07 – 1–06	Tipperary	Fraher Field, Dungarvan
	J Cronin 1–1, N Casey 0–4, Duggan 0–1, D Cullinane 0–1.		Cleary 0–4, Wright 1–0, Croghan 0–2.	Referee: Sgt. V. Aston

Final

8 July 1945 Final	Cork	1–11 – 1–06	Kerry	Fitzgerald Stadium, Killarney
	D Beckett 0–4, E Young 1–0, J Lynch 0–2, P O'Driscoll 0–2, N Casey 0–1, F O'Donovan 0–1, J Cronin 0–1,		M Lyne 0–4, T Landers 1–0, D Kavanagh 0–1, B Garvey 0–1.	Attendance: 7,000

=== Ulster Senior Football Championship ===
Preliminary round

17 June 1945 Preliminary round	Cavan	2–11 – 2–3	Antrim	Breffni Park, Cavan
	T O Reilly (2–0), M Higgins (0–2), T Tighe (0–2), P Donohoe (0–4), P Reilly (0–1), J Stafford (0–1), Martin (0–1)		Morgan (1-01) Gibson (1–0), Mc Ateer (0–1), Mc Randle (1–0), Armstrong (0–1)

Quarter-finals

10 June 1945 Quarter-final	Donegal	3–7 – 2–3	Derry	O'Donnell Park, Letterkenny

24 June 1945 Quarter-final	Armagh	3–13 – 0–2	Tyrone	Athletic Grounds, Armagh

24 June 1945 Quarter-final	Fermanagh	4–13 – 0–5	Monaghan	Brewster Park, Enniskillen

1 July 1945 Quarter-final	Cavan	0–14 – 1–3	Down	Athletic Grounds, Armagh
	P Donohoe (0–3), T O Reilly (0–3) J Stafford (0–3), M Higgins (0–5)		O Boyle (0–2), Bradley (1–0), Carr (0–1)

Semi-finals

8 July 1945 Semi-final	Fermanagh	2–4 – 1–6	Armagh	St. Tiernach's Park, Clones
				Attendance: 6,000

15 July 1945 Semi-final	Cavan	6–12 – 2–04	Donegal	St. Tiernach's Park, Clones
	J Stafford (2-03), P Donohoe (4–1) M Higgins (0–4), R Fitzsimons (0–3), J J O Reilly (0–1)		L Gallagher (1-02), J Doyle (0–1), J Gallagher (1-00), G Gallagher (0-01)

Final

29 July 1945 Final	Cavan	4–10 – 1–04	Fermanagh	St. Tiernach's Park, Clones
	P Donohoe 1–4, PJ Duke 1–1, PA O'Reilly 1–0, J Stafford 1–0, T Tighe 0–1, M Higgins 0–3, TP O'Reilly 0–1.		A Breslin 1–0, G O'Reilly 0–1, P Clarke 0–1, C Creamer 0–1, G O'Reilly 0–1.	Attendance: 10,000

=== All-Ireland Senior Football Championship ===
Semi-finals

12 August 1945 Semi-final	Cork	2–12 – 2–08	Galway	Croke Park, Dublin
	D Beckett 1–4, F O'Donovan 1–0, J Cronin 0–4, E Young 0–4, M Tubridy 0–1.		McManus 0–5, Canavan 1–0, Connolly 1–0, T Sullivan 0–2, Ryan 0–1.	Attendance: 33,336; Referee: P Lynch (Cavan)

19 August 1945 Semi-final	Cavan	1–04 – 0–05	Wexford	Croke Park, Dublin
	J Stafford 1–0, S Deignan 0–2, M Higgins 0–1, P Donohoe 0–1.		P Kehoe 0–3, D O'Neill 0–2.	Attendance: 44,526; Referee: B Nestor (Galway)

Final

23 September 1945 Final	Cork	2–05 – 0–07	Cavan	Croke Park, Dublin
	D Beckett 1–2, M Tubridy 1–1, H O'Neill 0–1, J Lynch 0–1.		J Stafford 0–4, TP O'Reilly 0–2, T Tighe 0–1.	Attendance: 67,329; Referee: J Dunne (Galway)

== Championship statistics ==
=== Miscellaneous ===
- Limerick beat Clare for the only time between 1909 and 1980.
- Wexford win the Leinster final for the first time since 1925.
- The attendance of 44,526 at Cavan-Wexford game was a new record for an All-Ireland semi-final.
- Cork end their longest drought as All Ireland Champions with future Taoiseach, Jack Lynch among the team a 34 year wait at and end first since 1911.
