= Billy Mackesy =

Irish hurler and Gaelic footballer

William "Billy" Mackesy
Personal information
- Born: 8 April 1880 Buttevant, County Cork, Ireland
- Died: 12 November 1956 (aged 76) Cork, Ireland
- Occupation: Publican

Sport
- Football Position: Forward
- Hurling Position: Forward
Clubs
- Years: Club
- Blackrock; Lees
Club titles
	Football	Hurling
Cork titles	7	6
Inter-county
Years	County	Apps (scores)
1903–1912 1901–1912	Cork (H); Cork (F)	19; 24
Inter-county titles
	Football	Hurling
Munster Titles	3	3
All-Ireland Titles	1	1

William Mackesy (8 April 1880 – 12 November 1956) was an Irish dual player of Gaelic games, a hurler and a footballer. At club level he played with Lees and Blackrock and was a member of the Cork senior teams in both codes. Mackessy is one of only fifteen players to have won All-Ireland medals in both codes.

== Career ==
Mackesy first came to prominence playing with Cork city-based clubs Blackrock and Lees. In a 12-year span from 1902 to 1914 he won a combined total of 13 County Championship medals across both codes including three hurling-football doubles. Mackesy first appeared on the inter-county scene as a member of the Cork senior football team in 1901. His debut season with the Cork senior hurling team two years later ended with him claiming a winners' medal after a defeat of London in the All-Ireland final. Mackesy became Cork's first dual All-Ireland medal-winner in 1911 when he lined out with the Cork senior footballers in their All-Ireland final defeat of Antrim. After making 43 championship appearances he retired from inter-county duty in 1912, by which time Mackesy had also claimed six Munster Championship medals across both codes.

== Personal life ==
Mackesy was born in Buttevant, County Cork but began his business career after moving to Kinsale. He later worked as a draper in the Munster Arcade in Cork city before opening his first licensed premises in 1912. He opened a second on Oliver Plunkett Street six years later. Mackesy married Anne Glavin, who died during childbirth. The baby's name was Aidan. He then married Eileen Sullivan and had 6 children.

Mackesy died at the Bon Secours Hospital in Cork on 12 November 1956. He had been in an ill health for a number of years with diabetes.

== Honours ==
Blackrock

- Cork Senior Hurling Championship: 1903, 1908, 1910, 1911, 1912, 1913

Lees

- Cork Senior Football Championship: 1902, 1903, 1904, 1907, 1908, 1911, 1914

Cork

- All-Ireland Senior Hurling Championship: 1903
- All-Ireland Senior Football Championship: 1911
- Munster Senior Hurling Championship: 1903, 1905, 1912
- Munster Senior Football Championship: 1901, 1906, 1907 (c)

Sporting positions
Preceded by Martin Connors	Cork Senior Football Team Captain; 1907-1908	Succeeded by Mick Mehigan
