= 1905 Cork Senior Football Championship =

Gaelic football competition

- Champions: Fermoy (5th title)
- Runners-up: Carbery Rangers

The 1905 Cork Senior Football Championship was the 19th staging of the Cork Senior Football Championship since its establishment by the Cork County Board in 1887.

Lees were the defending champions.

Fermoy won the championship following a defeat of Carbery Rangers in the final. This was their fifth championship title overall and their first title since 1900.

== Statistics ==
=== Miscellaneous ===
- Carbery Rangers qualify for the final for the first time.
