= Jack Shorten (Gaelic footballer) =

Irish Gaelic footballer

Personal information
- Native name: Seán Seartáin (Irish)
- Born: 17 March 1886 Ballingeary, County Cork, Ireland
- Died: 18 April 1972 (aged 86) Commons Road, Cork, Ireland
- Occupation: County council employee

Sport
- Sport: Gaelic Football
- Position: Full-back
Club
- Years: Club
- Lees
Club titles
- Cork titles: 4
Inter-county*
Years	County	Apps (scores)
1908-1915	Cork	10 (0-00)
Inter-county titles
- Munster titles: 1
- All-Irelands: 0
- *Inter County team apps and scores correct as of 13:22, 1 April 2021.

John Shorten (17 March 1886 – 18 April 1972) was an Irish Gaelic footballer who played as a full-back for club side Lees and at senior level for the Cork county team from 1908 until 1915.

== Career ==
Murphy first came to sporting prominence as a rugby union player with Cork Constitution. He later switched codes to Gaelic football and joined the Lees club with whom he won four County Championship titles. Success at club level saw Murphy drafted onto the Cork senior football team and he lined out in the 1907 All-Ireland final defeat by Dublin. Murphy won a Munster Championship medal in 1911 but was unable to play, in spite of being selected, in Cork's subsequent All-Ireland final victory over Antrim. He continued to line out with Cork until 1915.

== Personal life and death ==
Born in Ballingeary, County Cork, Murphy was educated at Presentation Brothers College, Cork and later took an appointment in the road department in Cork County Council.

Shorten died in at his home on the Commons Road in Cork on 18 April 1972.

== Honours ==
Lees

- Cork Senior Football Championship: 1907, 1908, 1911, 1914

Cork

- Munster Senior Football Championship: 1911
