= 1924 Cork Senior Football Championship =

Gaelic football competition

- Champions: Nil Desperandum (5th title)
- Runners-up: University College Cork

The 1924 Cork Senior Football Championship was the 36th staging of the Cork Senior Football Championship since its establishment by the Cork County Board in 1887.

Lees were the defending champions.

On 5 October 1924, Nils won the championship following an 0–08 to 0–02 defeat of University College Cork in the final at the Cork Athletic Grounds. This was their fifth championship title overall and their first title since 1917.

== Results ==
=== Final ===
5 October 1924 Final	Nils	0-08 - 0-02	University College Cork	Cork Athletic Grounds, Cork

== Championship statistics ==
=== Miscellaneous ===
- Nils win their first title since 1917.
