= 1899 All-Ireland Senior Football Championship final =

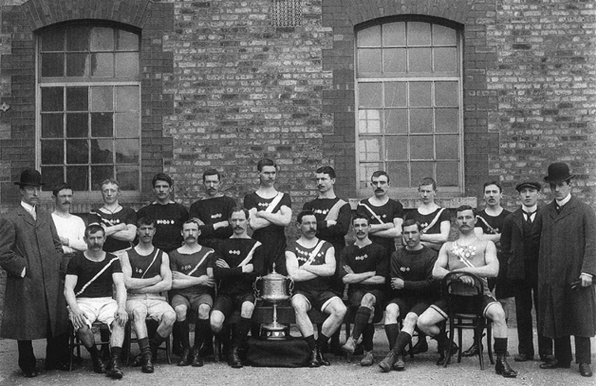
- Dublin, champions
- Event: 1899 All-Ireland Senior Football Championship
Dublin	Cork
1–10 (13)	0–6 (6)
- Date: 10 February 1901
- Venue: Jones' Road, Dublin
- Referee: L. Stanley (Louth)
- Attendance: 2,000
- Weather: fine

The 1899 All-Ireland Senior Football Championship final was the twelfth All-Ireland Final and the deciding match of the 1899 All-Ireland Senior Football Championship, an inter-county Gaelic football tournament for the top teams in Ireland.

== Match ==
=== Summary ===
Dublin, represented by the Geraldines club, were the winners. Cork were represented by the Nils club.

Dublin led 1–7 to 0–2 at half-time.

It was the sixth of six All-Ireland SFC titles won by Dublin in the 1890s.

=== Details ===
==== Dublin ====
- M. Rea (c)
- John Lane
- Peter McCann
- D. Smith
- Bill Sherry
- Tommy Errity
- Davy Brady
- John Ryan
- J. Norton
- J. J. Keane
- J. Farrelly
- P. Levey
- P. Fitzsimons
- Dan O'Callaghan
- Jack Heslin
- Joe Ledwidge
- Tom Hoey Redmond

==== Cork ====
- Dan Coughlan (c)
- Mick O'Sullivan
- J. Collins
- Billy Mackessy
- Willie O'Neill
- Dick Coughlan
- J. Murphy
- Con Walsh
- John Cronin
- J. Clifford
- Jack Kelleher
- John M. Long
- T. Howard
- Tom Irwin
- S. Murphy
- M. Ahern
- M. Barrett
