= Barry Studdert =

Irish Gaelic footballer (1936–2024)

Personal information
- Born: 1938 Wilton, Cork, Ireland
- Died: 9 July 2024 (aged 86) Newbridge, County Kildare, Ireland
- Occupation: Army officer

Sport
- Sport: Gaelic football
- Position: Midfield
Club
- Years: Club
- St Finbarr's
Club titles
- Cork titles: 2
Inter-county
Years	County	Apps (scores)
1960	Cork	1 (0-00)
Inter-county titles
- Munster titles: 0
- All-Irelands: 0
- NFL: 0

Finbarr M. Studdert (1938 – 9 July 2024) was an Irish Gaelic footballer. At club level he played with St Finbarr's and at inter-county level with the Cork senior football team.

== Career ==
Studdert played Gaelic football and hurling with his secondary school at Sullivan's Quay CBS in Cork. He lined out for the CBS in various competitions, including the Dr Harty Cup, while he also earned selection to the Munster Colleges team that beat Leinster Colleges in the 1956 All-Ireland final.

At club level, Studdert was a dual player with the St Finbarr's club on the southside of Cork city. He was part of the club's junior hurling team that went unbeaten in 20 games before capturing the Cork JHC title in 1956. Studdert also claimed a Cork SFC medal that year, after beating Millstreet in the final, before claiming a second consecutive title in 1957 after a defeat of Lees.

Studdert first played for Cork as a member of the minor team in 1956. He progressed to the junior team in 1960, with his performance in that grade earning his inclusion on the senior team for the 1960 Munster SFC. Studdert's last appearance for a Cork team was with the juniors in a defeat of Meath in the 1964 All-Ireland home final.

== Personal life and death ==
Studdert enlisted in the Irish Defence Forces in 1958 as a member of 32nd Cadet Class. He was commissioned as an officer in 1960 and posted to Custume Barracks in Athlone. He also served as an instructor in the Military College. Studdert served on a number of overseas tours of duty, including the Congo and Lebanon. After his retirement from the Defence Forces he became Dublin Area Civil Defence Officer.

Studdert died on 9 July 2024, at the age of 86.

== Honours ==
St Finbarr's

- Cork Senior Football Championship: 1956, 1957
- Cork Junior Hurling Championship: 1956

Munster

- All-Ireland Colleges Interprovincial Hurling Championship: 1956
