= 1896 Cork Senior Football Championship =

Gaelic football competition

- Champions: Lees (3rd title)
- Runners-up: Kanturk

The 1896 Cork Senior Football Championship was the 10th staging of the Cork Senior Football Championship since its establishment by the Cork County Board in 1887.

Fermoy were the defending champions.

Lees won the championship following a 0–03 to 0–00 defeat of Kanturk in the final at Cork Park. This was their third title overall and their first title since 1888.

== Results ==
=== Final ===
15 November 1896 Final	Lees	0-03 - 0-00	Kanturk	Mallow Town Park

== Statistics ==
=== Miscellaneous ===
- Lees their first title since 1888.
- Kanturk qualify for the final for the final.
