= 1925 Cork Senior Football Championship =

Football competition

- Champions: Nil Desperandum (6th title); W. Looney (captain)
- Runners-up: Macroom; D. Fitzgerald (captain)

The 1925 Cork Senior Football Championship was the 37th staging of the Cork Senior Football Championship since its establishment by the Cork County Board in 1887.

Nils were the defending champions.

On 18 October 1925, Nils won the championship following a 4–03 to 0–02 defeat of Macroom in the final at the Mardyke. This was their sixth championship title overall and their second title in succession. It remains their last championship title.

== Results ==
=== Final ===
18 October 1925 Final	Nils	4-03 - 0-02	Macroom	The Mardyke, Cork

== Championship statistics ==
=== Miscellaneous ===
- Nils win their sixth and final title.
