= 1959 Cork Senior Football Championship =

Gaelic football competition

- Dates: 5 April – 4 October 1959
- Teams: 25
- Champions: St. Finbarr's (3rd title); Donal Hurley (captain)
- Runners-up: Macroom

The 1959 Cork Senior Football Championship was the 71st staging of the Cork Senior Football Championship since its establishment by the Cork County Board in 1887. The draw for the first and second round fixtures took place on 25 January 1959. The championship ran from 5 April to 4 October 1959.

Macroom were the defending champions.

On 4 October 1959, St. Finbarr's won the championship following a 1-05 to 0-06 defeat of Macroom in the final. This was their third championship title overall and their first since 1957.

== Results ==
=== First round ===
| 5 April 1959 First round | Duhallow | 0-05 - 1-10 | Delaney Rovers | Bishop McEgan Park |

| 12 April 1959 First round | Avondhu | 0-04 - 0-05 | Collins | Riverstown Sportsfield |

| 12 April 1959 First round | Carbery | 1-05 - 3-08 | St Michael's | Bandon Grounds |

| 19 April 1959 First round | Cobh | 2-08 - 2-07 | Millstreet | Coachford Sportsfield |

| 19 April 1959 First round | Muskerry | 1-05 - 4-05 | Fermoy | Vishop Casey Memorial Park |

| 19 April 1959 First round | St Vincent's | 5-10 - 2-01 | Imokilly | Midleton Grounds |

| 26 April 1959 First round | Lees | 2-09 - 2-05 | Clonakilty | Bandon Grounds |

| 26 April 1959 First round | Garda | 0-11 - 1-04 | Glanmire | The Mardyke |

| 12 May 1959 First round | Macroom | 1-11 - 1-02 | Bandon | Clonakilty Grounds |

=== Second round ===
| 26 April 1959 Second round | Nemo Rangers | 1-05 - 4-07 | University College Cork | The Mardyke |

| 26 April 1959 Second round | St Nicholas' | 1-08 - 1-01 | Carrigdhoun | Ballinhassig Grounds |

| 24 May 1959 Second round | Beara | 1-05 - 2-04 | St Finbarr's | Skibbereen Grounds |

| 7 June 1959 Second round | Cobh | 0-03 - 1-09 | Fermoy | Riverstown Sportsfield |

| 7 June 1959 Second round | St Vincent's | 0-05 - 1-05 | Delaney Rovers | The Mardyke |

| 19 June 1959 Second round | Collins | 2-13 - 1-05 | Seandún | The Mardyke |

| 21 June 1959 Second round | Lees | 1-04 - 5-12 | Garda | The Mardyke |

| 28 June 1959 Second round | St Michael's | 1-08 - 1-12 | Macroom | Bandon Grounds |

=== Quarter-finals ===
| 10 July 1959 Quarter-final | University College Cork | 2-08 - 1-10 | Collins | The Mardyke |

| 15 July 1959 Quarter-final | Garda | 1-07 - 0-09 | Fermoy | The Mardyke |

| 17 July 1959 Quarter-final | St Finbarr's | 1-09 - 0-04 | St Nicholas | The Mardyke |

| 19 July 1959 Quarter-final | Macroom | 4-07 - 2-01 | Delaney Rovers | Cork Athletic Grounds |

=== Semi-finals ===
| 30 August 1959 Semi-final | Macroom | 3-06 - 1-06 | Garda | The Mardyke |

| 6 September 1959 Semi-final | St Finbarr's | 2-07 - 1-07 | University College Cork | Cork Athletic Grounds |

=== Final ===
| 4 October 1959 Final | St Finbarr's | 1-05 - 0-06 | Macroom | Cork Athletic Grounds |
| | | | | Referee: T Crowley (Clonakilty) |
