= 1920 Cork Senior Football Championship =

Gaelic football competition

- Champions: University College Cork (1st title)
- Runners-up: Cobh

The 1920 Cork Senior Football Championship was the 34th staging of the Cork Senior Football Championship since its establishment by the Cork County Board in 1887.

Cobh entered the championship as the defending champions.

University College Cork won the championship following a 5–04 to 0–01 defeat of Cobh in the final. This was their first ever championship title.

== Results ==
=== Final ===
Final	University College Cork	5-04 - 0-01	Cobh

== Championship statistics ==
=== Miscellaneous ===
- University College Cork qualify for the championship final for the first time and won a first title. They had previously won the 1916 title as Collegians.
- Cobh miss out on becoming only the second club to win three titles in a row.
