= 1902 Cork Senior Football Championship =

Gaelic football competition

- Champions: Lees (4th title)
- Runners-up: Kanturk

The 1902 Cork Senior Football Championship was the 16th staging of the Cork Senior Football Championship since its establishment by the Cork County Board in 1887.

Nils were the defending champions.

Lees won the championship following a 0–10 to 1–01 defeat of Kanturk in the final at Cork Park. This was their fourth title overall and their first title since 1896.

== Results ==
=== Final ===
Final	Lees	0-10 - 1-01	Kanturk	Cork Park

== Championship statistics ==
=== Miscellaneous ===
- Lees go return to the top of the Roll of Honour and remain there until the 2002 Cork Senior Football Championship when Nemo Rangers overtake them.
