= 1955 Cork Senior Football Championship =

Gaelic football competition

- Dates: 27 March – 23 October 1955
- Teams: 22
- Champions: Lees (12th title); Donal O'Sullivan (captain)
- Runners-up: Macroom; Johnny Creedon (captain)

Tournament statistics
- Matches played: 23
- Goals scored: 50 (2.17 per match)
- Points scored: 248 (10.78 per match)

The 1955 Cork Senior Football Championship was the 67th staging of the Cork Senior Football Championship since its establishment by the Cork County Board in 1887. The draw for the first round fixtures took place on 23 January 1955. The championship ran from 27 March to 23 October 1955.

St Nicholas' were the defending champions, however, they were beaten by Clonakilty in the first round.

The final was played on 23 October 1955 at the Athletic Grounds in Cork, between Lees and Macroom, in what was their second meeting in the final. Lees won the match by 3-04 to 0-09 to claim their 12th championship title overall and a first title in 32 years.

== Results ==
=== First round ===
27 March 1955 First round	Macroom	1-12 - 0-05	Glanworth	Banteer Grounds

10 April 1955 First round	Beara	1-07 - 1-07	Canovee	Bantry Grounds

17 April 1955 First round	St Vincent's	3-11 - 1-01	Imokilly	Páirc Uí Chonaill

1 May 1955 First round	Bandon	1-03 - 1-07	Duhallow	Castle Grounds

1 May 1955 First round replay	Beara	0-02 - 1-06	Canovee	Bantry Grounds

8 May 1955 First round	Clonakilty	2-02 - 0-03	St Nicholas'	Kinsale Showgrounds

8 May 1955 First round	Avondhu	1-07 - 1-07	Glanmire	Páirc Mhic Gearailt

29 May 1955 First round replay	Avondhu	2-08 - 1-05	Glanmire	Páirc Mhic Gearailt

- Muskerry, Lees, University College Cork, Carrigdhoun, Garda, Collins, Carbery, St Finbarr's, Millstreet and Seandún received a bye in this round.

=== Second round ===
27 March 1955 Second round	Collins	2-05 - 0-07 (void)	Garda	The Mardyke

17 April 1955 Second round	Muskerry	0-02 - 3-10	University College Cork	Coachford Sportsfield

24 April 1955 Second round	Seandún	1-04 - 0-04	Millstreet	Macroom Grounds

24 April 1955 Second round	Lees	1-07 - 1-04	Carrigdhoun	Ballinhassig Grounds

24 April 1955 Second round	Carbery	1-04 - 0-02	St Finbarr's	Bandon Grounds

29 May 1955 Second round	St Vincent's	3-10 - 2-01	Duhallow	Castle Grounds

19 June 1955 Second round	Canovee	1-09 - 1-04	Avondhu	Cork Athletic Grounds

10 July 1955 Second round	Macroom	1-07 - 1-04	Clonakilty	Cork Athletic Grounds

=== Quarter-finals ===
27 May 1955 Quarter-final	Garda	0-04 - 0-06	Lees	The Mardyke

29 May 1955 Quarter-final	Seandún	1-04 - 2-04	Carbery	Upton Grounds

23 June 1955 Quarter-final	St Vincent's	4-04 - 2-03	University College Cork	The Mardyke

7 August 1955 Quarter-final	Macroom	2-08 - 0-08	Canovee	Coachford Grounds

=== Semi-finals ===
21 August 1955 Semi-final	Lees	1-06 - 0-04	Carbery	Clonakilty Grounds

11 September 1955 Semi-final	St Vincent's	1-03 - 1-03	Macroom	Cork Athletic Grounds

16 October 1955 Semi-final replay	St Vincent's	0-05 - 0-08	Macroom	Cork Athletic Grounds

=== Final ===
23 October 1955 Final	Lees	3-04 - 0-09	Macroom	Cork Athletic Grounds
				Referee: T Crowley (Clonakilty)

== Championship statistics ==
=== Miscellaneous ===
- An objection by Garda regarding the constitution of the Collins team that beat them in the second round was upheld and the match awarded to Garda.
- Lees won their 12th and final Cork SFC title. They held their position at the top of the all-time roll of honour until 2002, when Nemo Rangers won their 13th title.
