= Tom Irwin (dual player) =

Irish Gaelic footballer, hurler, referee and Gaelic games administrator

Personal information
- Native name: Tomás Ó hEireamhóin (Irish)
- Nickname: Big Tom
- Born: 1 July 1873 Victoria Cross, Cork, Ireland
- Died: 22 February 1956 (aged 82) Cape Town, South Africa
- Occupation: Weigh clerk

Sport
- Football Position: Forward
- Hurling Position: Left wing-back
Clubs
- Years: Club
- Redmonds; Nils
Club titles
	Football	Hurling
Cork titles	2	3
Inter-county*
Years	County	Apps (scores)
1893–1899 1892–1902	Cork (SF); Cork (SH)	11; 14
Inter-county titles
	Football	Hurling
Munster Titles	3	3
All-Ireland Titles	0	1
- *Inter County team apps and scores correct as of 14:38, 11 August 2012.

Thomas Irwin (1 July 1873 – 22 February 1956) was an Irish hurler, Gaelic footballer, rugby player and cricketer. At club level, he played with Redmonds and Nils and at inter-county level with the Cork senior teams in both codes.

== Playing career ==
Born and raised in the Victoria Cross area of Cork, Irwin played a number of sports in his youth, including Gaelic football, hurling, soccer, cricket and rugby. He was part of the Redmonds team that won their inaugural Cork SHC title in 1892. Further Cork SHC titles followed in 1900 and 1901. Irwin played Gaelic football with Nil Desperandum and won Cork SFC titles in 1894 and 1901.

Redmonds represented Cork in the inter-county series of games in 1892, with Irwin winning the first of two consecutive Munster SHC medals. He later claimed an All-Ireland SHC medal, following a 2–03 to 1–05 win over Dublin in the 1892 All-Ireland SHC final.

As a dual player, Irwin won the first of two consecutive Munster SFC medals in 1893, however, Cork later lost the subsequent All-Ireland SFC finals to Wexford and Dublin. Irwin was expelled from the GAA by the County Board in 1896 for playing rugby. He appealed his expulsion to the National Executive and it was upheld as the so-called ban rule had been discarded at the adjourned Congress of 1896, from which Cork was denied representation as it had not paid its affiliation fee.

Irwin won a third Munster SFC medal in 1899, however, Cork were once again beaten by Dublin in the 1899 All-Ireland SFC final. He captained the Cork senior hurling team in 1900, before winning a third Munster SHC medal the following year.

== Post-playing career ==
Irwin served as secretary of the Cork County Board from 1901 to 1920. He was also a referee at club and inter-county levels and is the only person to have played in and refereed All-Ireland senior finals in both codes. Irwin was part of the Cork team that played an exhibition game against Tipperary in Belgium in August 1910.

== Personal life and death ==
Irwin worked as a weigh clerk with Cork Corporation. In May 1920, during the height of the War of Independence, Irwin witnessed a robbery and identified one of the perpetrators as a relative of an IRA member. His decision to do so, at a time of political tension, resulted him being forced to flee to South Africa. Irwin never returned to Ireland.

Irwin died on 22 February 1956, at the age of 82.

== Honours ==
Nils

- Cork Senior Football Championship (2): 1894, 1901

Redmonds

- Cork Senior Hurling Championship (3): 1892, 1900, 1901

Cork

- All-Ireland Senior Hurling Championship (1): 1892
- Munster Senior Hurling Championship (3): 1892, 1893, 1901
- Munster Senior Football Championship (3): 1893, 1894, 1899

Sporting positions
Preceded by	Cork senior hurling team captain 1900	Succeeded by Jack Leonard
Preceded by Ned Buckley	Secretary of the Cork County Board of the GAA; 1901-1920	Succeeded by Paddy O'Keeffe
Achievements
Preceded by M. F. Crowe; J. McCarthy	All-Ireland SHC final referee 1906; 1908	Succeeded by M. F. Crowe; M.F. Crowe
Preceded by M. O'Brennan	All-Ireland SFC final referee 1912	Succeeded by M. F. Crowe
