= Donal Hurley =

Irish Gaelic footballer (1936–2022)

Personal information
- Born: 1936 Cork, Ireland
- Died: 21 January 2022 (aged 85) Cork, Ireland
- Occupation: National school teacher
- Height: 5 ft 9 in (175 cm)

Sport
- Sport: Gaelic football
- Position: Left wing-back
Clubs
- Years: Club
- Erin's Hope; St Finbarr's
Club titles
	Football	Hurling
Cork titles	3	1
Inter-county
Years	County	Apps (scores)
1959–1960	Cork	3 (0-00)
Inter-county titles
- Munster titles: 0
- All-Irelands: 0
- NFL: 0

Donal Hurley (1936 – 21 January 2022) was an Irish Gaelic footballer, hurler and coach. At club level played with club sides Lees, Erin's Hope and St Finbarr's, and at inter-county level with the Cork senior football team.

== Playing career ==
Hurley first played Gaelic football for Cork as full-forward on the minor team during the unsuccessful 1954 Munster MFC campaign. A year later, he was part of the St Finbarr's team that won the Cork SHC title after beating Glen Rovers in the final. Hurley added a Cork SFC medal to his collection in 1956, while he also had the distinction of winning a Dublin SFC title with Erin's Hope the same year, as his teacher-training studies in the capital made him eligible to play with the club.

After returning to Cork, Hurley resumed his club career with St Finbarr's in 1957. He won a second Cork SFC title that year, before claiming a third winners' medal as team captain in 1959. By that stage, Hurley had joined the Cork senior football team. He served as team captain in 1960.

== Coaching career ==
In retirement from playing, Hurley became involved in team management and coaching. He was a selector when St Finbarr's beat St Michael's to win the Cork SFC in 1976. He was also a selector when St Finbarr's became All-Ireland Club SFC champions in 1987.

== Personal life and death ==
Hurley spent his entire working life as a teacher at the North Monastery Primary School in Cork. He died on 21 January 2022, at the age of 85. Hurley was posthumously honoured when the cup for the newly created Cork PJFC was named in his honour.

== Honours ==
=== Player ===
Erin's Hope

- Dublin Senior Football Championship: 1956

St Finbarr's

- Cork Senior Hurling Championship: 1955
- Cork Senior Football Championship: 1956, 1957, 1959 (c)

=== Management ===
St Finbarr's

- All-Ireland Senior Club Football Championship: 1987
- Munster Senior Club Football Championship: 1986
- Cork Senior Football Championship: 1976

Sporting positions
Preceded by Dan Murray	Cork senior football team captain 1960	Succeeded by Paddy Harrington
