= Denis Mehigan =

Irish Gaelic footballer

Personal information
- Native name: Donncha Ó Maothagáin (Irish)
- Born: 15 April 1890 Ardfield, County Cork, Ireland
- Died: 6 September 1959 (aged 69) Tramore, County Waterford, Ireland
- Occupations: Customs and excise official

Sport
- Sport: Gaelic Football
- Position: Centre-back
Club
- Years: Club
- Lees
Inter-county*
| Years | County | Apps (scores) |
| 1912-1916 | Cork | 5 (0-00) |
Inter-county titles
- Munster titles: 0
- All-Irelands: 0
- *Inter County team apps and scores correct as of 12:54, 11 August 2012.

Denis Mehigan (15 April 1890 – 6 September 1959) was an Irish Gaelic footballer who played as a centre-back for the Cork senior team.

Mehigan made his first appearance for the team during the 1912 championship and was a regular member of the starting fifteen until his retirement after the 1916 championship. A one-time captain of the Cork senior team, Mehigan enjoyed little success during his inter-county career.

At club level Mehigan was a multiple county championship medalist with Lees.

Mehigan hailed from a family with a strong association with Gaelic games. His older brother, Mick, captained Cork to the All-Ireland title in 1911. Another brother, Paddy, played both hurling and football for Cork and London and was later a pioneering Gaelic games journalist. A great-grandnephew, Owen Sexton, played for Cork in the 2000s.

Sporting positions
| Preceded by Mick Mehigan | Cork Senior Football Captain; 1915 | Succeeded by Paddy O'Connell |
