= Pat Lougheed =

Cork Gaelic footballer

Personal information
- Native name: Pádraig Ceann an Locha (Irish)
- Nickname: Locker
- Born: 1937 (age 88–89) Cork, Ireland
- Height: 5 ft 8 in (173 cm)

Sport
- Sport: Gaelic football
- Position: Left corner-forward
Club
- Years: Club
- St. Finbarr's
Club titles
- Cork titles: 3
Inter-county
Years	County	Apps (scores)
1956–1957	Cork	0 (0–00)
Inter-county titles
- Munster titles: 0
- All-Irelands: 0
- NFL: 0

Patrick J. Lougheed (born 1937) is a former Irish Gaelic footballer. At club level he played with St. Finbarr's and was also a member of the Cork senior football team.

== Playing career ==
Lougheed first played Gaelic football at underage levels with St. Finbarr's before joining the club's senior team. He won his first Cork SFC title as a substitute in 1956 before winning two titles on the field of play in 1957 and 1959. Lougheed captained the intermediate team to the Cork IFC title in 1970. He also lined out with the St. Finbarr's junior hurling team and

Lougheed first appeared on the inter-county scene with Cork during an unsuccessful two-year stint with the minor team in 1954 and 1955. Success at club level saw him drafted onto the senior team and he made a number of appearances, as well as captaining the team, during the 1956-57 National League.

== Coaching career ==
Lougheed first joined the St. Finbarr's senior team selection committee in 1968 and took over as coach in 1974. During his 14 seasons in that role, St. Finbarr's won five Cork SFC titles, three Munster SCFC titles and back-to-back All-Ireland Club Championships in 1980 and 1981. Lougheed vacated the post of trainer in 1988 but continued with the team as a selector until 1992 when he brought his 25-season management career to an end. He also served in a number of administrative positions with the club, including vice-chairman and president.

== Honours ==
=== Player ===
St. Finbarr's

- Cork Senior Football Championship: 1956, 1957, 1959
- Cork Intermediate Football Championship: 1970 (c)

=== Coach ===
St. Finbarr's

- All-Ireland Senior Club Football Championship: 1980, 1981
- Munster Senior Club Football Championship: 1979, 1980, 1982
- Cork Senior Football Championship: 1976, 1979, 1980, 1982, 1985
