= Meehan =

Meehan may refer to:

== People ==
- Andrew Meehan, former national director of Australians for Native Title and Reconciliation (ANTaR)
- Ben Meehan (born 1993), Australian rugby union player
- Bernadette Meehan (born 1975), American diplomat
- Brian Meehan (racehorse trainer) (born 1967), Irish racehorse trainer
- C. P. Meehan (1812–1890), Irish Catholic priest, historian and editor
- Gerry Meehan (born 1946), Canadian hockey player
- James Meehan (disambiguation)
- Jim Meehan, American poker player
- John Meehan (disambiguation)
- Lew Meehan (1890–1951), American actor
- Martin Meehan (Irish republican) (1945–2007), Sinn Féin politician and former member of the Provisional Irish Republican Army
- Marty Meehan (born 1956), American attorney and politician
- Michael J. Meehan (1891–1948), American stockbroker and the first person prosecuted by the Securities and Exchange Commission
- Pat Meehan (born 1955), member of the U.S. House of Representatives from Pennsylvania
- Patrick Meehan (1928–1994), British victim of a miscarriage of justice
- Shana Goldberg-Meehan, American television producer and television writer
- Sylvia Meehan (1929–2018), Irish campaigner for the rights of women and older people
- Thomas Meehan (botanist) (1826–1901), American botanist
- Thomas Meehan (writer) (1929–2017), American writer
- Tom Meehan (footballer, born 1909) (1909–1957), Australian rules footballer for Fitzroy
- Tom Meehan (footballer, born 1926) (1926–2018), Australian rules footballer for St Kilda and Fitzroy
- Tommy Meehan (1896–1924), English footballer
- Tony Meehan (1943–2005), Irish musician

== Other ==
- Meehan Auditorium, a 3,000-seat multi-purpose arena in Providence, Rhode Island, United States
- Meehan, County Westmeath, townland in St. Mary's civil parish, barony of Brawny, County Westmeath, Ireland
- Daniel Meehan, a character on the HBO drama Oz
- Meehan Range, mountain range in Hobart, Tasmania, Australia
- Meehan, Wisconsin, unincorporated community, United States

== See also ==
- Meechan, another variation of the surname
- Mehigan, another variation of the surname
- McMeekin, another, usually Scottish, variation of the surname
