= 1899 Cork Senior Football Championship =

Gaelic football competition

- Champions: Fermoy (3rd title)
- Runners-up: Nils

The 1899 Cork Senior Football Championship was the 13th staging of the Cork Senior Football Championship since its establishment by the Cork County Board in 1887.

Fermoy were the defending champions.

Fermoy won the championship following a defeat of Nils in the final at Cork Park. This was their third championship title overall and their second title in succession.
