= 1917 Cork Senior Football Championship =

Gaelic football competition

- Champions: Nil Desperandum (4th title)
- Runners-up: Lees

The 1917 Cork Senior Football Championship was the 31st staging of the Cork Senior Football Championship since its establishment by the Cork County Board in 1887.

Collegians were the defending champions.

On 28 October 1917, Nils won the championship following a 0–02 to 0–00 defeat of Lees in the final at the Cork Athletic Grounds. This was their fourth championship title overall and their first title since 1915.

== Results ==
=== Final ===
28 October 1917 Final	Nils	0-02 - 0-00	Fermoy	Cork Athletic Grounds, Cork
