= 1923 Cork Senior Football Championship =

Gaelic football competition

- Champions: Lees (11th title)
- Runners-up: Youghal

The 1923 Cork Senior Football Championship was the 35th staging of the Cork Senior Football Championship since its establishment by the Cork County Board in 1887.

University College Cork were the defending champions.

On 20 January 1924, Lees won the championship following a 0–03 to 0–02 defeat of Youghal in the final at the Cork Athletic Grounds. This was their 11th championship title overall and their first title since 1914.

== Results ==
=== Final ===
20 January 1924 Final	Lees	0-03 - 0-02	Youghal	Cork Athletic Grounds, Cork
