= Meechan =

Meechan may refer to:

- Alex Meechan (born 1980), English footballer
- Conor Meechan, Scottish film editor
- Frank Meechan (1929–1976), Scottish footballer
- James Meechan (born 1930), Scottish artist
- Jim Meechan (born 1963), Scottish footballer
- John Meechan (fl. 1933–1934), Scottish footballer
- Kenny Meechan (born 1972), Scottish footballer
- Mark Meechan (born 1987), Scottish YouTuber
- Peter Meechan (composer) (born 1980), British composer and conductor
- Peter Meechan (footballer) (1872–1915), Scottish footballer
- Steven Meechan (born 1991), Scottish footballer
- Tom Meechan (born 1991), English footballer

== See also ==
- Meehan, a similar surname
- Mehigan, a variation of the surname
- McMeekin, a variation of the surname, usually Scottish
