= 1907 Cork Senior Football Championship =

Gaelic football competition

- Champions: Lees (7th title); Billy Mackesy (captain)
- Runners-up: Macroom; Con O'Shea (captain)

Tournament statistics
- Goals scored: unsuccessfully defended its

The 1907 Cork Senior Football Championship was the 21st edition of the Cork Senior Football Championship since its establishment by the Cork County Board in 1887.

Fermoy unsuccessfully defended its 1906title.

Lees successfully pursued on 2 February 1908 in the Final in Coachford Sportsfield against Macroom, 0-07 - 1-02. This was their seventh successive title overall, a hiatus since their last in 1904.

== Results ==
=== Final ===
2 February 1908 Final	Lees	0-07 - 1-02	Macroom	Coachford Sportsfield
