= 1915 Cork Senior Football Championship =

Gaelic football competition

- Champions: Nil Desperandum (3rd title); A. Brennan (captain)
- Runners-up: Fermoy; A. Hallinan (captain)

The 1915 Cork Senior Football Championship was the 29th staging of the Cork Senior Football Championship since its establishment by the Cork County Board in 1887.

Lees were the defending champions.

On 8 August 1915, Nils won the championship following a 2–03 to 0–01 defeat of Fermoy in the final at the Cork Athletic Grounds. This was their third championship title overall and their first title since 1901.

== Results ==
=== Final ===
8 August 1915 Final	Nils	2-03 - 0-01	Fermoy	Cork Athletic Grounds, Cork
