= 1918 Cork Senior Football Championship =

Gaelic football competition

- Champions: Cobh (1st title)
- Runners-up: Fermoy

The 1918 Cork Senior Football Championship was the 32nd staging of the Cork Senior Football Championship since its establishment by the Cork County Board in 1887.

Nils were the defending champions.

On 20 October 1918, Cobh won the championship following a 0–03 to 0–01 defeat of Fermoy in the final at Midleton Sportsfield. This was their first ever championship title.

== Results ==
=== Final ===
20 October 1918 Final	Cobh	0-03 - 0-01	Fermoy	Midleton Sportsfield, Midleton
				Referee: T Iriwn (Cork Co. Board)

=== Miscellaneous ===
- Cobh win the title for the first time.
