= Paddy O'Connell (Gaelic footballer) =

Irish Gaelic footballer

Personal information
- Native name: Pádraig Ó Conaill (Irish)
- Born: 4 September 1888 Ovens, County Cork, Ireland
- Died: 7 April 1980 (aged 91) St. Helens, Lancashire, England
- Occupation: Farmer

Sport
- Sport: Gaelic Football
- Position: Right corner-forward
Club
- Years: Club
- Nils
Club titles
- Cork titles: 2
Inter-county
- Years: County
- 1911-1916: Cork
Inter-county titles
- Munster titles: 2
- All-Irelands: 1

Patrick John O'Connell (4 September 1888 – 7 April 1980) was an Irish Gaelic footballer who played for Cork Senior Championship club Nils. He played for the Cork senior football team for six seasons, during which time he usually lined out as a right corner-forward.

== Honours ==
Nils

- Cork Senior Football Championship (2): 1915, 1917

Cork

- All-Ireland Senior Football Championship (1): 1911
- Munster Senior Football Championship (2): 1911, 1916
