= Mehigan =

Origin
- Language: Irish Gaelic
- Meaning: "honourable"
- Region of origin: Ireland

Other names
- Variant form: Mehegan

Mehigan is an Irish surname. It comes from the Irish Gaelic name Ó Miadhacháin which derives from "Miadhach", which means "honourable". There are over a dozen variations on the surname, including Meighan, Meaghan, Mehegan, Megan, Meegan and Meehan.

== Mehigan ==
- Denis Mehigan (1890–1959), Irish Gaelic footballer
- Gary Mehigan (1967), English-Australian chef and restaurateur
- Irving P. Mehigan (1898–1980), American state senator for Wisconsin
- Joshua Mehigan (1969), American poet.
- Mick Mehigan (1887–1955), Irish Gaelic footballer
- P.D. Mehigan (1884–1965), Irish sportsperson and journalist

== Meighan ==
- Clement Woodward Meighan (1925–1997), archaeologist
- Hunter Meighan (1914–2008), New York politician
- John Meighan (1891–1978), Irish politician
- Patrick Meighan (born 1949), American saxophonist
- Ron Meighan (1963), Canadian ice hockey defenceman
- Thomas Meighan (1879–1936), American actor in silent films and early talkies
- Tom Meighan (1981), English musician, the lead vocalist of Kasabian

== Meighen ==
- Arthur Meighen (1874–1960), Canadian lawyer and politician who became Prime Minister, after whom the following locations in Canada are named:
  - Meighen Island, an uninhabited member of the Queen Elizabeth Islands
  - Mount Arthur Meighen, a mountain in the Premier Range of the Cariboo Mountains, British Columbia
- Felix Meighen (1812–1896), American businessman, brother of William Meighen and father of Thomas Meighen
- Isabel Meighen (1882–1985), the wife of Arthur Meighen
- Lillian Meighen Wright (1910–1993), Canadian philanthropist, and daughter of Arthur and Isabel Meighen
- Maxwell Meighen (1908–1992), Canadian financier, and son of Arthur and Isabel Meighen
- Michael Meighen (born 1939), Canadian lawyer, cultural patron and former senator, and son of Theodore Meighen
- Richard Meighen (died 1641), London publisher
- Theodore Meighen (1905–1979), Canadian lawyer and philanthropist and the son of Arthur and Isabel Meighen
- Thomas Meighen (1855–1936), American politician, son of Felix Meighen and nephew of William Meighen
- William Meighen (1819–1899), American politician, brother of Felix Meighen and uncle of Thomas Meighen

== See also ==
- Meehan, another variation of the surname
- McMeekin, a usually Scottish variation of the surname
- Megan, a Welsh given name that has variants Meaghan and Meighan
- Renault Mégane, a French car using the Megan name
