= 1898 Cork Senior Football Championship =

Irish football tournament

- Champions: Fermoy (2nd title)
- Runners-up: Dohenys

The 1898 Cork Senior Football Championship was the 12th staging of the Cork Senior Football Championship since its establishment by the Cork County Board in 1887.

Dohenys were the defending champions.

Fermoy won the championship after a successful appeal against Dohenys who defeated them by 0–01 to 0–02 in the final at Cork Park. This was their second championship title overall and their first title since 1895.

== Results ==
=== Final ===
Final	Fermoy	0-01 - 0-02 (declared null and void)	Dohenys	Cork Park

== Statistics ==
=== Miscellaneous ===
- Fermoy won the championship after a successful appeal against Dohenys
