= 1919 Cork Senior Football Championship =

Gaelic football competition

- Champions: Cobh (2nd title)
- Runners-up: Youghal

The 1919 Cork Senior Football Championship was the 33rd staging of the Cork Senior Football Championship since its establishment by the Cork County Board in 1887.

Cobh were the defending champions.

On 12 October 1919, Cobh won the championship following a 4–03 to 1–00 defeat of Youghal in the final at the Cork Athletic Grounds. This was their second championship title overall and their second title in succession. It remains their last championship title.

== Results ==
=== Final ===
12 October 1919 Final	Cobh	4-03 - 1-00	Youghal	Cork Athletic Grounds, Cork
