= 1963 Cork Intermediate Hurling Championship =

Irish hurling competition

- Dates: 14 April – 15 September 1963
- Teams: 14
- Champions: Cobh (3rd title)
- Runners-up: Castletownroche

Tournament statistics
- Matches played: 13
- Goals scored: 97 (7.46 per match)
- Points scored: 148 (11.38 per match)
- Top scorer(s): Liam McGrath (7–02)

The 1963 Cork Intermediate Hurling Championship was the 54th staging of the Cork Intermediate Hurling Championship since its establishment by the Cork County Board in 1909. The draw for the opening round fixtures took place on 27 January 1963. The championship ran from 14 April to 15 September 1963.

The final was played on 15 September 1963 at the Athletic Grounds in Cork, between Cobh and Castletownroche, in what was their first ever meeting in the final. Cobh won the match by 2–10 to 3–05 to claim their third championship title overall and a first title in 36 years.

Cobh's Liam McGrath was the championship's top scorer with 7–02.

== Results ==
=== First round ===
14 April 1963 First round	Ballymartle	0-06 - 4-02	Castletownroche	Cork Athletic Grounds
	S Nyhan 0-3, S Kelleher 0-2, J O'Mahony 0-1.		J McCarthy 3-0, E Galvin 1-0, B O'Sullivan 0-1, J Hogan 0-1.

21 April 1963 First round	Rathluirc	3-04 - 3-11	Mallow	Fr Con Buckley Park
	M O'Toole 3-2, D O'Mahony 0-2.		P Cotter 2-0, B Nagle 1-0, L Sheehan 0-3, M Sheehan 0-2, D Buckley 0-2, M O'Callaghan 0-2, N O'Regan 0-1, J O'Sullivan 0-1.

5 May 1963 First round	Tracton	3-05 - 5-07	Cloyne	Cork Athletic Grounds
	T Brady 1-2, J Murphy 1-1, B Quinn 1-0, P Walsh 0-1.		M O'Brien 2-1, D Cusack 1-4, J Aherne 1-0, T Kenneally 1-0, B Aherne 0-2.

5 May 1963 First round	Cobh	5-06 - 4-02	Éire Óg	Cork Athletic Grounds
	J O'Connell 2-1, S Butler 1-1, L McGrath 1-0, P O'Flynn 1-0, M Meaney 0-2, J Aherne 0-1, P Butler 0-1.		D O'Brien 2-0, D O'Leary 1-0, P O'Brien 1-0, M Murphy 0-2.

12 May 1963 First round	Fermoy	2-02 - 5-06	Glen Rovers	Cork Athletic Grounds
	R Ennis 1-0, A Scannell 1-0, M Flynn 0-2.		D O'Driscoll 1-1, N Kearney 1-1, J Buckley 0-4, N Crowley 1-0, B O'Connor 1-0, M Coughlan 1-0.

12 May 1963 First round	Carrigaline	3-05 - 3-07	Sarsfields	Cork Athletic Grounds
	C Cooney 1-3, R Duane 1-0, R O'Mahony 1-0, J Desmond 0-1, Canice Cooney 0-1.		P O'Meara 2-3, D Looney 1-0, J Long 0-2, JJ Long 0-1, P Crowley 0-1.

- Bandon and St Finbarr's received byes in this round.

=== Quarter-finals ===
5 May 1963 Quarter-final	St Finbarr's	3-07 - 2-05	Bandon	Ballinhassig Grounds
	M Ryan 1-1, J Goulding 1-1, D O'Connell 1-0, S O'Sullivan 0-2, P O'Sullivan 0-1, J Barrett 0-1, J McCarthy 0-1.		D McMahon 1-0, M O'Donovan 1-0, J Crowley 0-2, D O'Donovan 0-2, B O'Neill 0-1.

23 June 1963 Quarter-final	Castletownroche	5-06 - 3-05	Mallow	Kildorrery Grounds
				Referee: M O'Connell (St Vincent's)

23 June 1963 Quarter-final	Cloyne	4-03 - 7-04	Sarsfields	Clonmult Memorial Park
	D Cusack 4-0, J Ahern 0-1, J Duignan 0-1, D Clifford 0-1.		M Barry 2-3, T O'Sullivan 1-1, P Crowley 1-0, J Long 1-0, P O'Meara 1-0, D Looney 1-0.

23 June 1963 Quarter-final	Cobh	7-08 - 2-04	Glen Rovers	Clonmult Memorial Park
	L McGrath 3-2, J Butler 1-2, J O'Connell 1-1, P Butler 1-0, P O'Flynn 1-0, M Meaney 0-2, J Clifford 0-1.		D O'Brien 1-0, N Lynam 1-0, M Twomey 0-2, J Geaney 0-1, T O'Driscoll 0-1.

=== Semi-finals ===
21 July 1963 Semi-final	Castletownroche	8-05 - 4-04	St Finbarr's	Bishop Casey Memorial Park
	R Browne 4-3.

28 July 1963 Semi-final	Cobh	4-11 - 3-08	Sarsfields	Cork Athletic Grounds
	L McGrath 2-0, J Clifford 1-2, P Butler 1-1, M Meaney 0-3, S Butler 0-3, J O'Connell 0-1, J Aherne 0-1.		S Barry 1-4, M Barry 1-1, D Looney 1-0, M O'Regan 0-1, J Long 0-1, P Crowley 0-1.

=== Final ===
15 September 1963 Final	Cobh	2-10 - 3-05	Castletownroche	Cork Athletic Grounds
	J Clifford 1-1, L McGrath 1-0, M Meaney 0-3, P Butler 0-2, L Butler 0-1, S Butler 0-1, J Dorney 0-1, J O'Connell 0-1.		G Browne 1-3, J Hogan 1-0, C Flynn 1-0, P Noonan 0-1, J McCarthy 0-1.
