= Jack Shorten =

Jack Shorten may refer to:

- Jack Shorten (Australian rules footballer) (1887–1958), played for Collingwood
- Jack Shorten (Gaelic footballer) (1886–1972), played for Cork

== See also ==
- Jack Shore
- Jack Short (disambiguation)
