= 1906 Cork Senior Football Championship =

- Champions: Fermoy (6th title); P. Daly (captain)
- Runners-up: Carbery Rangers; F. Callanan (captain)

The 1906 Cork Senior Football Championship was the 20th staging of the Cork Senior Football Championship since its establishment by the Cork County Board in 1887.

Fermoy were the defending champions.

On 10 March 1907, Fermoy won the championship following an 0–08 to 0–00 defeat of Carbery Rangers in the final. This was their sixth championship title overall and their second title in succession.

== Results ==
=== Final ===
10 March 1907 Final	Fermoy	0-08 - 0-00	Carbery Rangers	Cork Athletic Grounds, Cork
				Referee: T Irwin (Cork)
