= Mort O'Shea =

Irish Gaelic footballer

Personal information
- Native name: Muircheartach Ó Séaghdha (Irish)
- Born: 13 January 1882 Adrigole, County Cork, Ireland
- Died: 19 August 1970 (aged 88) Mercy Hospital, Cork, Ireland
- Occupation: National school principal
- Height: 5 ft 8 in (173 cm)

Sport
- Sport: Gaelic football
- Position: Full-back
Clubs
- Years: Club
- Lees; Bantry; Adrigole
Club titles
- Cork titles: 1
Inter-county*
Years	County	Apps (scores)
1910-1913	Cork	7 (0-00)
Inter-county titles
- Munster titles: 1
- All-Irelands: 1
- *Inter County team apps and scores correct as of 16:47, 28 December 2012.

Morty O'Shea (13 January 1882 – 19 August 1970) was an Irish Gaelic footballer who played as a full-back for the Cork senior team.

O'Shea made his first appearance for the team during the 1910 championship and was a regular member of the starting fifteen until his retirement after the 1913 championship. During that time he won one All-Ireland medal and one Munster medal.

At club level O'Shea won several county club championship medals with Lees and Bantry.

== Honours ==
Adrigole

- Beara Junior Football Championship: 1929

Lees

- Cork Senior Football Championship: 1911

Cork

- All-Ireland Senior Football Championship: 1911
- Munster Senior Football Championship: 1911
