= 1919 Cork Intermediate Football Championship =

Gaelic football competition

- Champions: Nils (1st title)
- Runners-up: Macroom

The 1919 Cork Intermediate Football Championship was the 11th staging of the Cork Intermediate Football Championship since its establishment by the Cork County Board in 1909.

The final was played on 29 February 1920 at the Castle Grounds in Macroom, between Nils and Macroom, in what was their first ever meeting in the final. Nils won the match by 0–07 to 0–00 to claim their first ever championship title.

== Results ==
=== Final ===
29 February 1920 Final	Nils	0-07 - 0-00	Macroom	Castle Grounds
