= Mehegan =

Mehegan is a surname. Notable people with the surname include:

- John Mehegan (1916–1984), American jazz pianist, lecturer and critic
- Mary Xavier Mehegan (1825–1915), Irish-American nun
- Peter Mehegan, American politician

== See also ==
- Mehigan
- Mehregan
- Mohegan
