= 1916 Cork Senior Football Championship =

Gaelic football competition

- Champions: Collegians (1st title); James Mulvihill (captain)
- Runners-up: Fermoy; Arthur Hallinan (captain)

The 1916 Cork Senior Football Championship was the 30th staging of the Cork Senior Football Championship since its establishment by the Cork County Board in 1887.

Nils were the defending champions.

On 3 December 1916, Collegians won the championship following a 0–03 to 0–01 defeat of Fermoy in the final at the Cork Athletic Grounds. This was their first ever championship title.

== Results ==
=== Final ===
3 December 1916 Final	Collegians	0-03 - 0-01	Fermoy	Cork Athletic Grounds, Cork
				Referee: T Iriwn (Cork Co. Board)

== Championship statistics ==
=== Miscellaneous ===
- Collegians became the first college side to qualify for the championship final and won a first title.
