= 1895 Cork Senior Football Championship =

Gaelic football competition

- Champions: Fermoy (1st title)
- Runners-up: Nils

The 1895 Cork Senior Football Championship was the ninth staging of the Cork Senior Football Championship since its establishment by the Cork County Board in 1887.

Nils were the defending champions.

Fermoy won the championship following a 0–06 to 0–01 defeat of Nils in the final at Cork Park. This was their first ever championship title.

== Results ==
=== Final ===
Final	Fermoy	0-06 - 0-01	Nils	Cork Park

== Statistics ==
=== Miscellaneous ===
- Fermoy win the championship for the first time.
