= 1901 Cork Senior Football Championship =

Gaelic football competition

- Champions: Nil Desperandum (2nd title)
- Runners-up: Fermoy

The 1901 Cork Senior Football Championship was the 15th staging of the Cork Senior Football Championship since its establishment by the Cork County Board in 1887.

Fermoy were the defending champions.

Nils won the championship following an 0–08 to 0–04 defeat of Fermoy in a replay of the final. This was their second championship title overall and their first title since 1894.

== Results ==
=== Final ===
Final	Nils	0-08 - 0-04	Fermoy

== Statistics ==
=== Miscellaneous ===
- Nils their first title since 1894.
- Fermoy became the first team to qualify for four successive finals.
