= 1908 Cork Senior Football Championship =

Gaelic football competition

- Champions: Lees (8th title)
- Runners-up: Fermoy

The 1908 Cork Senior Football Championship was the 22nd staging of the Cork Senior Football Championship since its establishment by the Cork County Board in 1887.

Lees were the defending champions.

On 22 November 1908, Lees won the championship following a 2–08 to 0–06 defeat of Fermoy in the final. This was their eighth title overall and their second title in succession.

== Results ==
=== Final ===
22 November 1908 Final	Lees	2-08 - 0-06	Fermoy	Mallow Town Park, Mallow
