= 1888 Cork Senior Football Championship =

Association football tournament

- Champions: Lees (2nd title)
- Runners-up: Dromtarriffe

The 1888 Cork Senior Football Championship was the second staging of the Cork Senior Football Championship since its establishment by the Cork County Board in 1887.

Lees won the championship following a 0–03 to 0–01 defeat of Dromtarriffe in the final at Cork Park. This was their second title overall and their second title in succession.

== Results ==
=== Final ===
Final	Lees	0-03 - 0-01	Dromtarriffe	Cork Park

== Statistics ==
=== Miscellaneous ===
- Lees become the first team to win back to back titles.
