= 1903 Cork Senior Football Championship =

Gaelic football competition

- Champions: Lees (5th title)
- Runners-up: Dohenys

The 1903 Cork Senior Football Championship was the 17th staging of the Cork Senior Football Championship since its establishment by the Cork County Board in 1887.

Lees were the defending champions.

Lees won the championship following a 1–07 to 0–02 defeat of Dohenys in the final at Cork Park. This was their fifth title overall and their second title in succession.

== Results ==
=== Final ===
Final	Lees	1-07 - 0-02	Dohenys	Cork Park
