= 2006 Cork Premier Intermediate Football Championship =

- Dates: 8 April 2006 – 26 November 2006
- Teams: 12
- Sponsor: Evening Echo
- Champions: St. Vincent's (1st title); Declan O'Connell (captain); Keith Ricken (manager)
- Runners-up: Glanmire; Paul Hanley (captain); Brian Lotty (manager)

Tournament statistics
- Matches played: 29
- Goals scored: 25 (0.86 per match)
- Points scored: 427 (14.72 per match)
- Top scorer(s): James Murphy (0-39_

The 2006 Cork Premier Intermediate Football Championship was the inaugural staging of the Cork Premier Intermediate Football Championship since its establishment by the Cork County Board. The draw for the opening round fixtures took place on 11 December 2005. The championship began on 8 April 2006 and ended on 26 November 2006.

The final was contested between St. Vincent's and Glanmire at Páirc Uí Rinn in Cork. After two replays, St. Vincent's won the title by 1-05 to 0-07 to claim their first championship title in the grade and a first title in any grade since 1968.

Glanmire's James Murphy was the championship's top scorer with 0-39.

== Results ==
=== Round 1 ===
8 April 2006 Round 1	St. Vincent's	0-14 - 0-08	Newmarket	Mourne Abbey
	G O'Connor 0-7, D O'Connor 0-2, A Buckley 0-2, JP O'Connor 0-1, C Barry 0-1, T O'Sullivan 0-1.		SF O'Connor 0-3, K O'Connor 0-1, M Mortell 0-1, T O'Keeffe 0-1, C O'Sullivan 0-1, M O'Reidy 0-1.

8 April 2006 Round 1	Glenville	0-08 - 0-09	Newcestown	Belgooly
	J Halbert 0-6, N O'Riordan 0-1, N O'Connell 0-1.		C Keane 0-5, H Curran 0-3, C O'Donovan 0-1.

8 April 2006 Round 1	Mayfield	3-07 - 3-11	Kiskeam	Páirc Eoin Mhic Charthaigh
	J O'Donovan 2-1, M Barry 1-1, T Lotty 0-2, L Crowley 0-1, E Crowley 0-1, B Heagrty 0-1.		B Dennehy 2-0, N Cronin 0-6, D Scannell 1-1, E O'Mahony 0-2, M Herlihy 0-1, D Cremin 0-1.

9 April 2007 Round 1	Youghal	0-05 - 0-06	Killavullen	Bride Rovers Park
	P Moylan 0-2, K Desmond 0-2, L Desmond 0-1.		L Dorgan 0-3, J O'Neill 0-2, P Hartnett 0-1.

16 April 2006 Round 1	Glanmire	0-17 - 0-07	Ballinora	Mayfield
	J Murphy 0-7, M Cussen 0-3, D Molden 0-2, K Mulvihill 0-2, F O'Reilly 0-1, T Drinan 0-1, B O'Callaghan 0-1.		G O'Halloran 0-2, E Lougheed 0-2, D O'Neill 0-1, C O'Shea 0-1, C Sheehan 0-1.

17 April 2006 Round 1	Nemo Rangers	0-10 - 1-08	Clyda Rovers	Páirc Eoin Mhic Charthaigh
	J Kavanagh 0-4, S Marshall 0-2, M Kearney 0-2, P Morgan 0-1, G Kerins 0-1.		C O'Sullivan 1-0, J Murphy 0-3, D O'Shea 0-2, P Kissane 0-1, P Mullane 0-1, D O'Brien 0-1.

=== Round 2 ===
10 June 2006 Round 2	Newmarket	1-06 - 1-10	Youghal	Ballyhooly
	SF O'Connor 1-1, SA Murphy 0-2, K O'Connor 0-2, D Flynn 0-1.		P Moylan 1-9, M Ó Laochdha 0-1.

10 June 2006 Round 2	Mayfield	1-11 - 1-13	Ballinora	Ballincollig
	P Condon 1-6, M Barry 0-1, D Lucey 0-1, B Hegarty 0-1, D Crowley 0-1, T Lotty 0-1.		M Murphy 1-3, G O'Halloran 0-5, C Brosnan 0-3, M Twohig 0-1, D O'Hara 0-1.

13 June 2006 Round 2	Glenville	0-07 - 0-13	Nemo Rangers	Páirc Shéamuis de Barra
	R Cahill 0-3, P Cahill 0-2, K Coakley 0-1, E O'Reilly 0-1.		W Morgan 0-4, J Kavanagh 0-2, P O'Shea 0-2, M Kearney 0-2, L O'Sullivan 0-1, JP O'Neill 0-1, S Marshall 0-1.

=== Round 3 ===
5 July 2006 Round 3	Killavullen	2-10 - 1-15	Nemo Rangers	Bride Rovers Park
	A O'Driscoll 1-3, J O'Neill 1-0, D Luddy 0-2, G Kelleher 0-2, B O'Driscoll 0-2, D Relihan 0-1.		W Morgan 0-5, J Kavanagh 1-0, M Kearney 0-3, A Cronin 0-2, E Weldon 0-2, P O'Shea 0-1, P Morgan 0-1, G Cummins 0-1.

=== Quarter-finals ===
14 July 2006 Quarter-final	Kiskeam	0-09 - 0-09	Glanmire	Dr. Croke Park
	N Cronin 0-5, E O'Mahony 0-2, C O'Leary 0-1, T Dennehy 0-1.		J Murphy 0-3, D Molden 0-2, R Ryan 0-1, M Cussen 0-1, P Meaney 0-1, K Mulvihill 0-1.

15 July 2006 Quarter-final	Newcestown	2-06 - 1-09	Nemo Rangers	Ballinhassig
	P Condon 1-2, B O'Mahony 1-0, T Twomey 0-2, C Keane 0-2.		C O'Brien 1-0, W Morgan 0-3, M Kearney 0-2, J Kavanagh 0-1, E Weldon 0-1, JP O'Neill 0-1, A Cronin 0-1.

16 July 2006 Quarter-final	Ballinora	0-07 - 0-12	St. Vincent's	Ballincollig
	C Brosnan 0-3, G O'Halloran 0-2, M Murphy 0-2.		G O'Connor 0-7, D O'Connor 0-2, J Buckley 0-2, JP Murphy 0-1.

23 July 2006 Quarter-final	Clyda Rovers	2-08 - 1-05	Youghal	Páirc Mac Gearailt
	D O'Brien 1-2, F Dorgan 1-0, P Mullane 0-2, J Murphy 0-2, P Kissane 0-1, R Carey 0-1.		J Ormonde 1-1, B McCarthy 0-3, P Kelly 0-1.

27 July 2006 Quarter-final replay	Kiskeam	1-07 - 1-10	Glanmire	Dr. Croke Park
	J Angland 1-0, N Cronin 0-3, M Herlihy 0-2, E O'Mahony 0-1, D Herlihy 0-1.		J Murphy 0-7, D Molden 1-0, B Kirby 0-2, R Ryan 0-1.

2 August 2006 Quarter-final replay	Newcestown	1-11 - 0-15 (aet)	Nemo Rangers	Innishannon
	T Ryan 1-3, T Twomey 0-6, B Horgan 0-2.		W Morgan 0-7, L O'Sullivan 0-3, E Weldon 0-1, C O'Brien 0-1, A Cronin 0-1, M Kearney 0-1, P Hogan 0-1.

=== Semi-finals ===
12 August 2006 Semi-final	St. Vincent's	0-08 - 0-08	Clyda Rovers	Páirc Mac Gearailt
	D O'Connor 0-2, J Buckley 0-2, JP Murphy 0-2, J Canniffe 0-1, C Barry 0-1.		D O'Shea 0-4, J Murphy 0-2, D O'Brien 0-1, M O'Brien 0-1.

27 August 2006 Semi-final replay	St. Vincent's	0-10 - 1-06	Clyda Rovers	Páirc Mac Gearailt
	C Barry 0-2, G O'Connor 0-2, J Buckley 0-2, JP Murphy 0-2, A Buckley 0-1, J O'Callaghan 0-1.		J Murphy 1-4, P Kissane 0-1, D O'Shea 0-1.

1 October 2006 Semi-final	Glanmire	0-12 - 0-12	Nemo Rangers	Páirc Uí Chaoimh
	D Molden 0-5, J Murphy 0-3, M Cussen 0-2, B O'Callaghan 0-1, P Meaney 0-1.		W Morgan 0-8, M Kearney 0-2, D Kearney 0-1, D Kavanagh 0-1.

5 November 2006 Semi-final replay	Glanmire	1-08 - 0-08	Nemo Rangers	Páirc Uí Rinn
	J Murphy 0-6, D Molden 1-0, K Murphy 0-1, B O'Callaghan 0-1.		D Kearney 0-2, J Kavanagh 0-2, JP O'Neill 0-1, M Kearney 0-1, L O'Sullivan 0-1, P Morgan 0-1.

=== Finals ===
11 November 2006 Final	St. Vincent's	0-08 - 0-08	Glanmire	Páirc Uí Rinn
	D O'Connor 0-2, J Buckley 0-2, G O'Connor 0-2, T O'Connell 0-1, C Barry 0-1.		J Murphy 0-4, D Molden 0-1, K Murphy 0-1, B O'Callaghan 0-1, M Cussen 0-1.

17 November 2006 Final replay	St. Vincent's	0-12 - 0-12	Glanmire	Páirc Uí Rinn
	G O'Connor 0-5, D O'Connor 0-2, C Barry 0-2, A Buckley 0-1, F Murphy 0-1, T O'Connell 0-1.		J Murphy 0-4, B Kirby 0-2, M Cussen 0-1, D Molden 0-1, C Mulvihill 0-1, K Murphy 0-1, P Meaney 0-1, P Hanley 0-1.

26 November 2006 Final 2nd replay	St. Vincent's	1-05 - 0-07	Glanmire	Páirc Uí Rinn
	G O'Connor 0-4, D O'Connor 1-0, JP Murphy 0-1.		J Murphy 0-5, B O'Callaghan 0-1, K Murphy 0-1.

== Championship statistics ==
=== Top scorers ===
Overall

Rank	Player	Club	Tally	Total	Matches	Average
1	James Murphy	Glanmire	0-39	39	8	4.87
2	Gavin O'Connor	St. Vincent's	0-27	27	6	4.50
3	William Morgan	Nemo Rangers	0-27	27	5	5.40
4	Daniel Molden	Nemo Rangers	2-11	17	7	2.42
5	James Murphy	Clyda Rovers	1-11	14	4	3.50
5	Paul Moylan	Youghal	1-11	14	3	4.50
5	Niall Cronin	Kiskeam	0-14	14	3	4.50
6	Derek O'Connor	St. Vincent's	1-10	13	6	2.16
6	Michael Kearney	Nemo Rangers	0-13	13	7	1.85
7	Joe Kavanagh	Nemo Rangers	1-09	12	7	1.71

In a single game

Rank	Player	Club	Tally	Total	Opposition
1	Paul Moylan	Youghal	1-09	12	Newmarket
2	Paul Condon	Mayfield	1-06	9	Ballinora
3	William Morgan	Nemo Rangers	0-08	8	Glanmire
4	Jamesie O'Donovan	Mayfield	2-01	7	Kiskeam
4	James Murphy	Clyda Rovers	1-04	7	St. Vincent's
4	Gavin O'Connor	St. Vincent's	0-07	7	Newmarket
4	James Murphy	Glanmire	0-07	7	Ballinora
4	Gavin O'Connor	St. Vincent's	0-07	7	Ballinora
4	James Murphy	Glanmire	0-07	7	Kiskeam
4	William Morgan	Nemo Rangers	0-07	7	Newcestown

=== Miscellaneous ===
- On 10 June 2006, the Nemo Rangers-Glenville second-round tie was abandoned after 58 minutes after a Glenville selector became ill. The match was replayed several days later.
- St. Vincent's become the first Premier Intermediate Football Champions.
