= Joseph Meehan =

Joseph Meehan or Joe Meehan may refer to:

- Joseph Meehan (horticulturalist)
- Joseph Meehan (basketball), former head coach of La Salle Explorers men's basketball
- Joseph Meehan (wrestler), ring name Joey Ryan, professional wrestler
- Joe Meehan, Australian rules footballer
