= 1911 Cork Junior Hurling Championship =

Irish hurling competition

- Champions: Rangers (1st title); Peter Woods (captain)
- Runners-up: Cobh; George Finn (captain)

The 1911 Cork Junior Hurling Championship was the 17th staging of the Cork Junior Hurling Championship since its establishment by the Cork County Board in 1895.

The final was played on 26 November 1911 at the Athletic Grounds in Cork, between Rangers and Cobh, in what was their first ever meeting in the final. Rangers won the match by 4–01 to 0–00 to claim their first ever championship title.

== Results ==
=== Final ===
26 November 1911 Final	Rangers	4-01 - 0-00	Cobh	Cork Athletic Grounds
