= 1923 Cork Junior Hurling Championship =

Irish hurling competition

- Champions: Geraldines (1st title)
- Runners-up: Cobh

The 1923 Cork Junior Hurling Championship was the 26th staging of the Cork Junior Hurling Championship since its establishment by the Cork County Board in 1895.

The final was played on 29 June 1924 at the Athletic Grounds in Cork between Geraldines and Cobh, in what was their first ever meeting in the final. Geraldines won the match by 5-04 to 5-03 to claim their first ever championship title.

== Results ==
=== Final ===
| 29 June 1924 Final | Geraldines | 5-04 - 5-03 | Cobh | Cork Athletic Grounds |
