= Thomas Meehan =

Thomas Meehan is the name of:

- Thomas Meehan (botanist) (1826–1901), British-born nurseryman, botanist and author
- Thomas Meehan (writer) (1929–2017), American playwright
- Tommy Meehan (1896–1924), England international footballer
- Tom Meehan (footballer, born 1909) (1909–1957), Australian rules footballer for Fitzroy
- Tom Meehan (footballer, born 1926) (1926–2018), Australian rules footballer for St Kilda and Fitzroy
