= 1959 Cork Junior Hurling Championship =

Irish hurling competition

- Dates: 20 September – 8 November 1959
- Teams: 7
- Champions: Cobh (5th title)
- Runners-up: Ballyhea

Tournament statistics
- Matches played: 6
- Goals scored: 39 (6.5 per match)
- Points scored: 82 (13.67 per match)

The 1959 Cork Junior Hurling Championship was the 62nd staging of the Cork Junior Hurling Championship since its establishment by the Cork County Board in 1895.

The final was played on 8 November 1959 at the Athletic Grounds in Cork, between Cobh and Ballyhea, in what was their first ever meeting in the final. Cobh won the match by 3-09 to 2-06 to claim a record-equalling fifth championship title overall and a first championship title in 33 years.

== Results ==
=== Quarter-finals ===
20 September 1959 Quarter-finals	Cloughduv	2-10 - 2-04	Tullylease	Banteer Sportsfield

11 October 1959 Quarter-final	Cobh	7-05 - 3-04	Dohenys	Cork Athletic Grounds

18 October 1959 Quarter-final	Shamrocks	1-11 - 2-04	Lough Rovers	Carrigaline Grounds

- Ballyhea received a bye in this round.

=== Semi-finals ===
25 October 1959 Semi-final	Cobh	4-08 - 3-07	Cloughduv	Cork Athletic Grounds

1 November 1959 Semi-final	Ballyhea	7-02 - 3-12	Shamrocks	Cork Athletic Grounds

=== Final ===
8 November 1959 Final	Cobh	3-09 - 2-06	Ballyhea	Cork Athletic Grounds
