= John Meehan =

John Meehan may refer to:

- John Meehan (Australian politician) (1864–1930), Irish-born Australian politician
- John Meehan (screenwriter) (1890–1954), Canadian screenwriter
- John Meehan (art director) (1902–1963), American art director and production designer
- John Meehan (dancer) (born 1950), Australian dancer and ballet director
- John Meehan (priest), Canadian Jesuit priest and university president
- John Silva Meehan (1790–1863), American printer and publisher
- Chick Meehan (John Francis Meehan, 1893–1972), American football player and coach
- Chick Meehan (basketball) (John Dennis Meehan, 1917–2004), American basketball player
- Dirty John, a podcast about "Dirty John" Meehan, an American criminal
- Dirty John (TV series), an American television series based on the podcast about "Dirty John" Meehan, an American criminal

== See also ==
- Meehan (disambiguation)
