= Mick Mehigan =

Irish Gaelic footballer and politician (1886–1955)

Personal information
- Native name: Mícheál Ó Maothagáin (Irish)
- Born: 12 September 1886 Ardfield, County Cork, Ireland
- Died: 20 December 1955 (aged 69) Clontarf, Dublin, Ireland
- Occupation: Civil servant

Sport
- Sport: Gaelic Football
- Position: Left wing-back
Clubs
- Years: Club
- Clonakilty; Lees
Club titles
- Cork titles: 5
Inter-county*
| Years | County | Apps (scores) |
| 1906–1917 | Cork | 23 (0–4) |
Inter-county titles
- Munster titles: 3
- All-Irelands: 1
- *Inter County team apps and scores correct as of 20:08, 10 April 2012.

Michael Mehigan (12 September 1886 – 20 December 1955) was an Irish Gaelic footballer and politician.

== Sporting career ==
Mehigan played as a left wing-back for the Cork senior team. He made his first appearance for the team during the 1906 championship and was a regular member of the starting fifteen over the next decade. During that time he won one All-Ireland medal and three Munster medals. In 1911 Mehigan captained the team to the All-Ireland title.

At club level Mehigan was a multiple county championship medalist with Lees. He began his club career with Clonakilty.

Mehigan hailed from a family with a strong association with Gaelic games. His younger brother, Denis, followed him onto the Cork football team. His elder brother, Paddy, played both hurling and football for Cork and London and was later a pioneering Gaelic games journalist. A great-grandnephew, Owen Sexton, played for Cork in the 2000s.

== Political activity ==
Mehigan was active in Sinn Féin from 1917. In 1920, he was arrested and sent to Wormwood Scrubs prison where, with others, he was involved in a hunger strike in April/May. In June 1920, back in Cork, he acted as returning officer during the local elections in the county. He became chairman of the Cork Rural District Council in 1921.

After the Anglo-Irish Treaty he took the pro-Treaty side but did not engage in the Civil War. In the 1922 general election he toured the polling booths in the Clonakilty district with Michael Collins.

After the Civil War he moved to Dublin and worked in the civil service.

Sporting positions
| Preceded by | Cork Senior Football Captain; 1911 | Succeeded by |
| Preceded by Jack O'Driscoll | Cork Senior Football Captain; 1914 | Succeeded by Denis Mehigan |
Achievements
| Preceded by Larry McCormack | All-Ireland Senior Football Final winning captain 1911 | Succeeded by Jim Smith |
