= 1913 Cork Junior Hurling Championship =

Irish hurling competition

- Champions: Cobh (2nd title); J. Langford (captain)
- Runners-up: St Mary's; D. Corbett (captain)

The 1913 Cork Junior Hurling Championship was the 19th staging of the Cork Junior Hurling Championship since its establishment by the Cork County Board in 1895.

The final was played on 14 December 1913 at the Riverstown Sportsfield in Glanmire, between Cobh and St Mary's, in what was their first ever meeting in the final. Cobh won the match by 1-03 to 1-02 to claim their second championship title overall and a first championship titles in six years.

== Results ==
=== Final ===
14 December 1913 Final	Cobh	1-03 - 1-02	St Mary's	Riverstown Sportsfield
