= Billy Field (Gaelic footballer) =

Irish Gaelic footballer

Personal information
- Native name: Liam an Mhachaire (Irish)
- Born: 1952 (age 73–74) Blackrock, County Cork, Ireland
- Occupation: Bank official

Sport
- Sport: Gaelic Football
- Position: Right corner-forward
Club
- Years: Club
- 1971-1981: St Michael's
Club titles
- Cork titles: 1
College
- Years: College
- University College Cork
College titles
- Sigerson titles: 1
Inter-county*
Years	County	Apps (scores)
1972-1976	Cork	6 (2-20)
Inter-county titles
- Munster titles: 1
- All-Irelands: 1
- NFL: 0
- All Stars: 0
- *Inter County team apps and scores correct as of 20:13, 12 April 2012.

William Field (born 1952) is an Irish former Gaelic footballer. At club level he played with St Michael's and at inter-county level was a member of the Cork senior football team.

== Career ==
Field enjoyed his first successes, not as a Gaelic footballer but as a hurling goalkeeper with the Blackrock minor team that won Cork MHC titles in 1968 and 1969. He also played as a schoolboy with Coláiste Chríost Rí and was part of the school team that won a Corn Uí Mhuirí-Hogan Cup double in 1970. He was later a member of the University College Cork team that beat University College Galway to win the Sigerson Cup title in 1972. Field first appeared on the inter-county scene as a member of the Cork minor football team in 1970. He later appeared with the under-21 team after making his senior team debut in December 1972. Field was Cork's top scorer in his debut season and also won a Munster SFC, however, he suffered a broken leg which ruled him out of Cork's 1973 All-Ireland final defeat of Galway. He returned to the team over team over the following few seasons. Field was also a member of the St. Michael's team that lost three consecutive Cork SFC finals from 1976 to 1978.

== Honours ==
Coláiste Chríost Rí

- Hogan Cup: 1970
- Corn Uí Mhuirí: 1970

University College Cork

- Sigerson Cup: 1972

Blackrock

- Cork Minor Hurling Championship: 1968, 1969

Cork

- Munster Senior Football Championship: 1973
