= Mariana Beer =

American politician

Member-elect of the New Hampshire House of Representatives from the Merrimack 12th district
- Assuming office December 2026
- Succeeding: Peter Mehegan

Personal details
- Party: Democratic

Mariana Beer is an American politician. A member of the Democratic Party, she is the member-elect for the Merrimack 12th district of the New Hampshire House of Representatives.
