= Derek Kavanagh =

Irish sportsperson (born 1980)

Personal information
- Born: 29 October 1980 (age 46) Ballyphehane, Cork, Ireland
- Height: 6 ft 2 in (188 cm)

Sport
- Sport: Gaelic football
- Position: Midfield
Club
- Years: Club
- 1999-2011: Nemo Rangers
Club titles
- Cork titles: 8
- Munster titles: 4
- All-Ireland Titles: 1
Inter-county
Years	County	Apps (scores)
2003-2010	Cork	26 (0-5)
Inter-county titles
- Munster titles: 3
- All-Irelands: 1
- NFL: 1
- All Stars: 0

Derek Kavanagh (born 29 October 1980 in Tony Ville, High Street, Cork, Ireland) is an Irish sportsperson. He plays Gaelic football with his local club Nemo Rangers and was a member of the Cork senior inter-county team from 2003 until 2010.

== Biography ==
Kavanagh was born in the Turner's Cross suburb of Cork City in 1980. The youngest of five sons (Pat, Larry, Joe, Paul, Derek) his first sporting love was soccer. Three Kavanagh brothers played with Casement Celtic and Tramore Athletic, two fierce city rivals, and grew up near Turner's Cross, home of the newly formed Cork City F.C. Kavanagh's passion for soccer changed when his older brother Joe joined the Cork minor football team. Three Kavanagh brothers (Joe, Larry, Derek) would subsequently play together with the famous Nemo Rangers club on the south side of the city. Derek is also famous for being one of the youngest members of The High Street Warriors - a loose collective of High Street natives with particular ties to the Tonyville cul-de-sac. The group was famed for late night games of tip the can, endless games of Nods and Volleys, brutal games of Runaway Runaway Knock, and imposing their dominating presence over Warrior Square (just opposite Zico's Pizzas). The shadowy group have always declined public comment and a full membership list has always eluded the authorities though local folklore suggests a rite of passage involved each member scrawling his name into the Capwell Road street sign (usually with Tipex or a nail).

== Playing career ==
=== Club ===
Kavanagh plays his club football with the famous Nemo Rangers club in Cork city and has enjoyed much success. He first came to prominence as a player on the club's minor team that captured the county minor championship title in 1999. Kavanagh later joined the Nemo under-21 football team, winning back-to-back county championship winners’ medals in 2001 and 2002.

By this stage Kavanagh had made his debut with the Nemo Rangers senior team. He secured a county championship winners’ medal in this grade in 2000, following a ten-point defeat of divisional side Carbery. Nemo later represented Cork in the provincial club championship and even reached the final of that competition. An 0–11 to 0–7 defeat of Kerry's Glenflesk gave Kavanagh a Munster club winners' medal. He later lined out in the foot-and-mouth delayed All-Ireland club final, with Mayo's Crossmolina providing the opposition. Nemo looked to be in the driving seat, however, a second-half comeback, inspired by Kieran McDonald, saw the momentum switch to the Mayo side. A late Colin Corkery goal narrowed the deficit to one point, however, Nemo were eventually and narrowly defeated by 0–16 to 1-12.

In 2001 Kavanagh secured a second county championship title as Nemo Rangers trounced Bantry Blues in the final. A second Munster club winners’ medal was quickly secured, after a 1–11 to 0–10 defeat of Fethard. Kavanagh subsequently lined out in his second consecutive All-Ireland club final, this time with Ballinderry providing the opposition. The championship decider was switched to Semple Stadium because of the reconstruction of Croke Park, however, a change of venue did not suit Nemo. Goals by Gerard Cassidy and Declan Bateson gave the Derry side a comfortable 2–10 to 0–9 victory. It was a second consecutive All-Ireland defeat for Nemo.

2002 saw Nemo becoming the first team in nearly sixty years to win three county championship titles in-a-row. A third consecutive Munster club title quickly followed for Kavanagh, as Nemo trounced Monaleen of Limerick by 4–15 to 0–6. For the third successive year Kavanagh subsequently lined out in the All-Ireland club final, however, Nemo faced the prospect of becoming three-in-a-row losers. Crossmolina provided the opposition for the second time in three years and the game was a close affair. Colin Corkery scored six points to give Nemo a merited 0–14 to 1–9 victory. At the third time of asking Kavanagh had finally captured an All-Ireland club winners’ medal.

After failing to secure a fourth successive county title in-a-row, Kavanagh won ahis next county championship winners’ medal in 2005 as Muskerry were defeated by ten points. He later missed out on Nemo's Munster club final victory.

In 2006 Nemo retained their county title with Kavanagh securing a fifth county championship medal.

The club made it three-in-a-row in 2007 following a defeat of Ilen Rovers before later facing Ballinacourty in the Mulster final. Nemo never really looked troubled and a 1–10 to 1–7 score line gave Kavanagh a fourth Munster club winners' medal. Another All-Ireland final appearance in two years soon followed with Dublin side St. Vincent's lining out against Nemo. Kavanagh's side fought back from a six-point deficit, however, they still lost out by the narrowest of margins on a score line of 1–11 to 0-13.

In 2008 Nemo Rangers had the chance to make history by capturing a fourth county title in succession. All went to plan with Kavanagh's side lining out against Douglas. Nemo proved that they were the best club side in Cork once again with a 0–13 to 0–5 defeat of their nearest neighbours. It was Kavanagh's seventh county winners' medal. Nemo, however, were later ambushed by eventual Munster champions Dromcollogher-Broadford in the subsequent provincial club series of games.

Nemo failed to secure an unprecedented fifth successive county title in 2009, however, this was only a temporary blip as the following year Kavanagh won an eight county championship winners' medal.

=== Inter-county ===
Kavanagh first came to prominence on the inter-county scene as a member of the Cork minor football team in the late nineties. After enjoying little success in this grade he was an automatic choice for the Cork under-21 football team. In 2001 he won a Munster title in that grade following a 1–12 to 0–8 defeat of Limerick. Cork were subsequently defeated in the All-Ireland semi-final. Kavanagh enjoyed no further success with the county under-21 footballers.

In 2003 Kavanagh made his debut with the Cork senior footballers. It was an unhappy period as the team hit rock bottom in Kavanagh's debut season, culminating in an embarrassing defeat by Roscommon.

In 2006 Kavanagh was appointed captain of the Cork team as 'the Rebels' began to emerge from the shadow of their greatest rivals Kerry. That year the team lined out against 'the Kingdom' in the Munster final once again. That game ended in a 0-10 apiece draw. The replay saw a much fresher Cork team defeat Kerry by 1–12 to 0–9. James Masters proved the hero of the day, as he scored 1–7. Kavanagh had finally secured a Munster winners’ medal in the senior grade. The quirks of the championship saw Cork face Kerry again in the subsequent All-Ireland semi-final. In a similar pattern to previous encounters Cork failed to beat Kerry at Croke Park. A 0–16 to 0–10 score line resulted in Kavanagh's side being defeated.

In 2007 Kavanagh was captain again as Cork narrowly lost their Munster crown to Kerry. In spite of the 1–15 to 1–13 defeat Cork still had another chance to claim the All-Ireland title. Cork later did well in the All-Ireland series and finally qualified for the All-Ireland championship decider. Kerry, however, were the opponents. While the first half was played on an even keel, 'the Kingdom' ran riot in the second half and a rout ensued. At the full-time whistle Cork were trounced by 3–13 to 1–9.

In 2008 Cork gained a modicum of revenge on Kerry when sides met in the Munster final. Kerry were cruising by eight points at the interval, however, Cork stormed back in the second-half. Kerry could only muster three points as Cork secured a memorable 1–16 to 1–11 victory. It was Kavanagh's second Munster winners' medal. Both sides met again in the All-Ireland semi-final, however, after a thrilling draw and a replay Kerry were the team that advanced to the championship decider.

The following year Kavanagh became a bit player on the Cork team as a recurring hip injury took its toll. He missed Cork's Munster final defeat of Limerick but did make a brief cameo in the subsequent All-Ireland final showdown with Kerry. Cork had a 1–3 to 0–1 lead early in the opening half, however, the Kerry team stuck to their gameplan, helped in no small part by a Cork side that recorded fourteen wides. At the final whistle Kerry were the champions again by 0–16 to 1–9.

In 2010 Kavanagh returned for one last chance at claiming an All-Ireland medal. Cork failed to impress throughout the championship, however, the team still qualified for a third All-Ireland final appearance in four years. Down provided the opposition on that occasion in the first meeting between these two teams since 1994. Cork got off to a lightning start, however, they eased off and trailed by three points at the interval. Paul Kerrigan got his sole point of the match to put 'the Rebels' ahead for the first time in fifty minutes as Kavanagh entered the game to make a midfield cameo. Cork stretched the lead to three points, however, Down fought back. At the full-time whistle Cork were the champions by 0–16 to 0-15 and Kavanagh finally picked up an All-Ireland winners' medal.

In November 2010 Kavanagh announced his retirement from inter-county football.

Preceded by Eoin Sexton	Cork Senior Football Captain; 2006-2007	Succeeded by Graham Canty
