= 1927 All-Ireland Colleges Interprovincial Hurling Championship =

- Dates: 7 May 1927
- Teams: 2
- Champions: Munster (1st title); J. Hurley (captain)
- Runners-up: Leinster; P. Nugent (captain)

Tournament statistics
- Matches played: 1
- Goals scored: 4 (4 per match)
- Points scored: 6 (6 per match)

The 1927 All-Ireland Colleges Interprovincial Hurling Championship was the inaugural staging of the All-Ireland Colleges Interprovincial Hurling Championship. While provincial championships had been played in both Leinster and Munster since 1918, this was the first time that representative teams faced each other in an All-Ireland series.

The final was played on 7 May 1927 at Croke Park in Dublin, between Munster and Leinster, in what was their first ever meeting in the final. Munster won the match by 4–03 to 0–03 to claim their first ever All-Ireland title.

== Participating teams ==
Province	Colleges involved
Leinster	St Kieran's College, St Joseph's College
Munster	Limerick CBS, North Monastery, Presentation Brothers College, Rockwell College, St Colman's College, St Munchin's College, St Finbarr's College

== Results ==
=== Final ===
7 May 1927 Final	Munster	4-03 - 0-03	Leinster	Croke Park
	B Cogan 1-1, Breen 1-0, O'Dea 1-0, O'Callaghan 0-1, Fogarty 0-1,		Murphy 0-1, Bollard 0-1, Ryan 0-1.	Referee: P Dunphy (Dublin)
