= 1926 Cork Junior Hurling Championship =

Irish hurling competition

- Champions: Cobh (4th title)
- Runners-up: College Rovers

The 1926 Cork Junior Hurling Championship was the 30th staging of the Cork Junior Hurling Championship since its establishment by the Cork County Board.

On 21 February 1927, Cobh won the championship following an 8–02 to 2–01 defeat of College Rovers in the final. This was their fourth championship title overall and their first title since 1916.
