= 1893 Cork Senior Football Championship =

Gaelic football competition

- Champions: Dromtarriffe (1st title)
- Runners-up: Castlemartyr

The 1893 Cork Senior Football Championship was the seventh staging of the Cork Senior Football Championship since its establishment by the Cork County Board in 1887.

On 16 July 1893, Dromtarriffe won the championship following a 0–05 to 0–03 defeat of Castlemartyr in the final at Cork Park. It remains their only championship title.

== Results ==
=== Final ===
| 16 July 1893 Final | Dromtarriffe | 0-05 - 0-03 | Castlemartyr | Cork Park |

== Statistics ==
=== Miscellaneous ===
- Dromtarriffe win their first title.
