= Ned Rea =

Irish hurler (1944–2021)

Éamonn "Ned" Rea
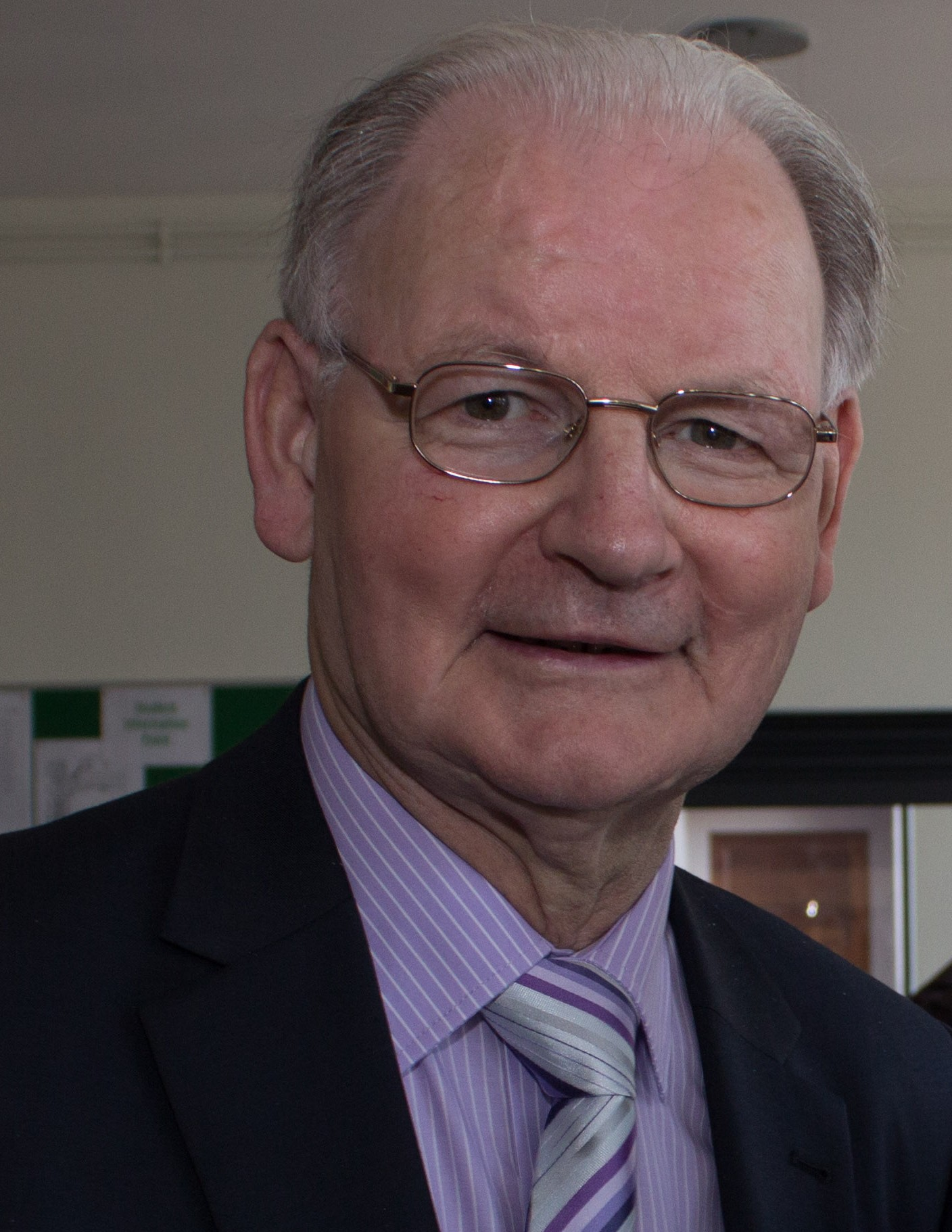
- Rea in 2013

Personal information
- Native name: Éamonn Ó Riabhaigh (Irish)
- Nickname: Ned
- Born: May 1944 Glenroe, County Limerick, Ireland
- Died: 22 November 2021 (aged 77) Tallaght, Dublin, Ireland
- Occupation: Publican
- Height: 6 ft 0 in (183 cm)

Sport
- Sport: Hurling
- Position: Full-forward
Clubs
- Years: Club
- 1969–1980: Effin; Kilmallock; Faughs
Club titles
- Dublin titles: 3
College
- Years: College
- University College Cork
College titles
- Fitzgibbon titles: 2
Inter-county
Years	County	Apps (scores)
1963–1977	Limerick	15 (3–08)
Inter-county titles
- Munster titles: 2
- All-Irelands: 1
- NHL: 0
- All Stars: 0

Éamonn "Ned" Rea (May 1944 – 22 November 2021) was an Irish hurler who played as a full-forward for the Limerick senior team.

Rea joined the team during the 1964 championship and was a regular member of the starting fifteen until his retirement after the 1974 championship. During that time he won one All-Ireland medal and two Munster medals. Rea was an All-Ireland runner-up on one occasion.

At club level Rea was a three-time county club championship medalist with Faughs. He began his career with Effin.

He attended St Munchin's College, Limerick.

His brother, Gerry Rea, was also an inter-county hurler, while his granduncle, Matt Rea, was an All-Ireland medal winner as a Gaelic footballer with Dublin.

== Playing career ==
=== Club ===
Rea began his club hurling career with Effin before joining Dublin club Faughs in 1968. It was with the latter club that he enjoyed his greatest success.

After losing the 1969 championship decider, Faughs were back in the final again the following year. A defeat of St. Vincents gave Rea his first championship medal.

Faughs surrendered their title the following year but went on to win back-to-back titles in 1972 and 1973, bringing Rea's championship medal tally to three.

=== Inter-county ===
Rea's performances at club level brought him to the attentions of the inter-county selectors and he soon joined the Limerick senior team.

In 1973, after eighteen years in the doldrums, Limerick finally made the provincial breakthrough. A last-gasp free by Richie Bennis secured a narrow 6-7 to 2-18 defeat of Tipperary in the provincial decider and a first Munster medal for Rea. Limerick later lined out as underdogs in Croke Park for an All-Ireland showdown with reigning champions and injury-ravaged Kilkenny. A Mossie Dowling goal eight minutes after half-time, together with play from Richie Bennis powered Limerick to a 1-21 to 1-14 victory and secured an All-Ireland medal for Rea.

In 1974 Limerick maintained their provincial dominance. Rea captured a second Munster medal following a 6-14 to 3-9 trouncing of Clare. This victory allowed Rea's side to advance directly to the All-Ireland final where Kilkenny provided the opposition once again. The Cats were back to full strength and set out for revenge. In spite of this Limerick stormed into an early lead, however, this was diminished as Pat Delaney, Eddie Keher and Mick Brennan scored goals. Limerick lost the game by 3-19 to 1-13.

=== Inter-provincial ===
Rea also had the honour of being selected for Munster in the inter-provincial series of games but enjoyed little success.

== Personal life ==
Born in Glenroe, County Limerick, Munster, in May 1944, Rea was the eldest in a farming family of eight boys and three girls. His family moved to nearby Effin when he was an infant. Rea was a boarder at St Munchin's College in Limerick where he was a proficient rugby player and claimed three Muster junior medals and a senior schools medal. He later studied dairy science at University College Cork where he graduated before being appointed a creamery manager in Athlacca and later with Galtee Food Products. He became a publican in 1989, opening Rea’s Pub on Parkgate Street in Dublin.

He died on 22 November 2021, at the age of 77 after falling ill earlier in the month.

== Honours ==
=== Player ===
University College Cork

- Fitzgibbon Cup: 1965, 1966

Effin

- South Limerick Minor Hurling Championship: 1959

Kilmallock

- South Limerick Minor Hurling Championship: 1961

Faughs

- Dublin Senior Club Hurling Championship: 1970, 1972, 1973

Limerick

- All-Ireland Senior Hurling Championship: 1973
- Munster Senior Hurling Championship: 1973, 1974

=== Selector ===
Faughs

- Dublin Senior Club Hurling Championship: 1986
