= 1900 Cork Senior Football Championship =

Gaelic football competition

- Champions: Fermoy (4th title); M. Spillane (captain)
- Runners-up: Kinsale; J. Mackesrsy (captain)

The 1900 Cork Senior Football Championship was the 14th staging of the Cork Senior Football Championship since its establishment by the Cork County Board in 1887.

Fermoy were the defending champions.

On 20 January 1901, Fermoy won the championship following a 1–09 to 1–06 defeat of Kinsale in the final at Turners Cross. This was their fourth championship title overall while they also became the first team to win three successive titles.

== Results ==
=== Final ===
20 January 1901 Final	Fermoy	1-09 - 1-06	Kinsale	Turners Cross, Cork

== Statistics ==
=== Miscellaneous ===
- Fermoy became the first team to win three successive titles.
- Kinsale qualify for their only final to date.
