= 1911 Cork Senior Football Championship =

Gaelic football competition

- Champions: Lees (9th title); Mick Mehigan (captain)
- Runners-up: Nils; Con Ronayne (captain)

The 1911 Cork Senior Football Championship was the 25th staging of the Cork Senior Football Championship since its establishment by the Cork County Board in 1887.

Macroom were the defending champions.

On 22 October 1911, Lees won the championship following a 2–04 to 0–01 defeat of Nils in the final at the Cork Athletic Grounds. This was their eighth title overall and their second title in succession.

== Results ==
=== Final ===
| 22 October 1911 Final | Lees | 2-04 - 0-01 | Nils | Cork Athletic Grounds, Cork |
