= 1976 Cork Senior Football Championship =

Gaelic football competition

- Dates: 18 April 1976 – 14 November 1976
- Teams: 20
- Champions: St. Finbarr's (4th title); Jimmy Barry-Murphy (captain); Pat Lougheed (manager)
- Runners-up: St Michael's; Andy Creagh (captain)

Tournament statistics
- Matches played: 20
- Goals scored: 61 (3.05 per match)
- Points scored: 328 (16.4 per match)
- Top scorer: Billy Field (1-30)

The 1976 Cork Senior Football Championship was the 88th staging of the Cork Senior Football Championship since its establishment by the Cork County Board in 1887. The draw for the opening round fixtures took place on 24 January 1976.

Nemo Rangers entered the championship as the defending champions, however, they were beaten by St. Finbarr's in the semi-finals.

The final was played on 14 November 1976 at the newly-opened Páirc Uí Chaoimh in Cork, between St. Finbarr's and St. Michael's, in what was their first ever meeting in the final. St. Finbarr's won the match by 1-10 to 1-07 to claim their fourth championship title overall and a first title in 17 years.

Billy Field was the championship's top scorer with 1-30.

== Team changes ==
=== To Championship ===
Promoted from the Cork Intermediate Football Championship

- Bantry Blues

== Results ==
=== First round ===
18 April 1976 First round	St Michael's	4-12 - 1-07	Avondhu	Clonmult Memorial Park
	B Field 1-6, E O'Donoghue 2-1, G Delaney 1-1, D McCurtain 0-3, R Cummins 0-1.		N Kirby 1-2, D Lonergan 0-3, M O'Mahony 0-1, B O'Neill 0-1.	Referee: A Twomey (Ballincollig)

18 April 1976 First round	Seandún	2-10 - 1-06	Imokilly	Ballinlough Grounds
	J Atkins 1-2, P Regan 1-2, B Meade 0-2, J Nodwell 0-1, N Walsh 0-1, M O'Regan 0-1, W Driscoll 0-1.		M Magee 0-4, S Farrell 1-0, T Murphy 0-1, B Óg Murphy 0-1.

2 May 1976 First round	Muskerry	1-08 - 3-10	Millstreet	Castle Grounds
	N Dunne 1-5, M Mehigan 0-2, D Curran 0-1.		D O'Connor 1-2, J Kenneally 1-1, T Burke 0-4, D O'Shea 1-0, T Kelleher 0-2, J Coleman 0-1.

2 May 1976 First round	University College Cork	2-13 - 0-10	Na Piarsaigh	Ballinlough Grounds
	C Kearney 1-5, S Murphy 1-3, C Mangan 0-1, J Cregan 0-1, T Foley 0-1, P Liston 0-1, T Sullivan 0-1.		J O'Sullivan 0-3, R McDonnell 0-2, B Whitley 0-2, F Buckley 0-1, G Moynihan 0-1, B Kelleher 0-1.	Referee: P Cronin (St. Finbarr's)

=== Second round ===
18 April 1976 Second round	Carbery	0-10 - 0-15	Nemo Rangers	Cloughduv Grounds
	T Murphy 0-9, J Gabriel 0-1.		C Murphy 0-4, K Collins 0-3, L Good 0-3, N Morgan 0-2, S Coughlan 0-1, J Barrett 0-1, D Allen 0-1.	Referee: F Halbert (Glenville)

18 April 1976 Second round	St. Finbarr's	4-09 - 3-04	Duhallow	Bishop Casey Memorial Park
	T Goulding 3-0, J Barry-Murphy 1-4, J McCarthy 0-3, E Fitzpatrick 0-1, R Kenny 0-1.		P O'Connor 2-0, B Daly 1-2, P O'Sullivan 0-1, J O'Riordan 0-1.

18 April 1976 Second round	Clonakilty	1-05 - 2-10	Bishopstown	Innishannon Grounds
	D McCarthy 1-0, K Harrington 0-2, M Leahy 0-1, TF Hayes 0-1, F Regan 0-1.		N Murphy 2-1, J Crowley 0-3, T O'Reilly 0-2, F Groarke 0-2, E McCarthy 0-1, G O'Herlihy 0-1.	Referee: D Collins (Kinsale)

1 May 1976 Second round	St. Nicholas'	3-04 - 2-05	Carrigdhoun	Manning Park
	F O'Sullivan 2-3, L Hedderman 1-0, G O'Sullivan 0-1.		M Burke 1-2, J O'Sullivan 1-1, G Hanley 0-1, C Callaghan 0-1.

2 May 1976 Second round	Beara	3-05 - 2-13	Bantry Blues	Ballingeary Grunds
	S O'Shea 1-0, F McCarthy 1-0, S O'Sullivan 1-0, B Hanley 0-3, T O'Neill 0-1, M O'Sullivan 0-1.		D Hunt 1-4, F Carroll 1-1, D Barron 0-4, K Evans 0-2, V McCarthy 0-1, J O'Riordan 0-1.

16 May 1976 Second round	Dohenys	1-09 - 0-03	Macroom	Charlie Hurley Park
	D Collins 1-5, C O'Rourke 0-2, B O'Rourke 0-1, J Collins 0-1.		J Allen 0-2, L Gould 0-1.	Referee: D Collins (Kinsale)

27 June 1976 Second round	St Michael's	2-17 - 3-05	Millstreet	Coachford Grounds
	D MacCurtain 1-4, B Field 0-7, D Buckley 1-3, R Cummins 0-3.		D O'Shea 2-0, B McSweeney 1-1, T Kelleher 0-2, D O'Connor 0-1, M Gilsenan 0-1.	Referee: J Creal (Kilmichael)

27 June 1976 Second round	Seandún	0-05 - 1-08	University College Cork	The Mardyke
	P Regan 0-2, J McCarthy 0-2, E Forde 0-1.		S Murphy 0-5, T O'Sullivan 1-1, J Mulvihill 0-1, J Crean 0-1.

=== Quarter-finals ===
26 June 1976 Quarter-final	St. Finbarr's	2-10 - 3-03	Bishopstown	Páirc Uí Chaoimh
	J Barry-Murphy 1-0, G McCarthy 1-0, O McCarthy 0-3, R Kenny 0-1.		G McCarthy 1-1, N Murphy 1-0, T O'Reilly 1-0.

27 June 1976 Quarter-final	Nemo Rangers	3-10 - 0-04	Dohenys	Charlie Hurley Park
	D Allen 1-2, L Good 1-1, N Morgan 1-1, K Collins 0-4, C Murphy 0-2.		C O'Rourke 0-2, D Collins 0-1.

27 June 1976 Quarter-final	St. Nicholas'	1-09 - 1-09	Bantry Blues	Clonakilty Grounds
	T O'Neill 1-2, F O'Sullivan 0-3, J O'Neill 0-3, P Harte 0-1.		D Hunt 1-0, K Evans 0-2, D Barron 0-2, PJ Minihane 0-1, J O'Riordan 0-1, V McCarthy 0-1, T Delaney 0-1, D Cotter 0-1.

4 July 1976 Quarter-final replay	St. Nicholas'	1-06 - 0-10	Bantry Blues	Clonakilty Grounds
	J O'Sullivan 1-0, F O'Sullivan 0-2, JJ O'Neill 0-2, T O'Neill 0-1, P Harte 0-1.		D Barron 0-5, K Evans 0-3, D Hunt 0-1, J O'Riordan 0-1.

18 July 1976 Quarter-final	St Michael's	2-13 - 3-01	University College Cork	Ballinlough Grounds
	B Field 0-8, E O'Donoghue 1-1, D Buckley 1-1, P Kavanagh 0-2, R Cummins 0-1.		P Liston 2-0, F Hanley 1-0, J Crean 0-1.

=== Semi-finals ===
12 September 1976 Semi-final	St Michael's	4-08 - 0-07	Bantry Blues	Sam Maguire Park
	B Field 0-5, P Kavanagh 1-1, D Buckley 1-0, E O'Donoghue 1-0, K Warner 1-0, D McCurtain 0-1.		F Carroll 0-4, D Hunt 0-1, T Delaney 0-1, P McCarthy 0-1.

8 August 1976 Semi-final	St. Finbarr's	0-10 - 0-08	Nemo Rangers	Páirc Uí Chaoimh
	J McCarthy 0-4, J Barry-Murphy 0-3, C Myers 0-2, F Twomey 0-1.		K Collins 0-4, L Good 0-2, C Murphy 0-1, J Barrett 0-1.	Referee: F Halbert (Glenville)

=== Final ===
14 November 1976 Final	St. Finbarr's	1-10 - 1-07	St Michael's	Páirc Uí Chaoimh
	J Barry-Murphy 1-1, G McCarthy 0-3, R Kenny 0-2, F Twomey 0-1, J O'Callaghan 0-1, O McCarthy 0-1, É Fitzpatrick 0-1.		B Field 0-4, D McCurtain 1-0, D Buckley 0-2, É O'Donoghue 0-1.	Attendance: 11,062; Referee: J Dennigan (Fermoy)

== Championship statistics ==
=== Top scorers ===
Overall

Rank	Player	Club	Tally	Total	Matches	Average
1	Billy Field	St. Michael's	1-30	33	5	6.60
2	Jimmy Barry-Murphy	St. Finbarr's	3-08	17	4	4.25
3	Éamonn O'Donoghue	St. Michael's	4-03	15	5	3.00
3	Danny Buckley	St. Michael's	3-06	15	5	3.00
5	Frank O'Sullivan	St. Nicholas'	2-08	14	3	4.66
5	Dermot MacCurtain	St. Michael's	2-08	14	5	2.80
7	Gerry McCarthy	St. Finbarr's	1-10	13	4	3.25
8	Donal Hunt	Bantry Blues	2-06	12	4	3.00
9	Seán Murphy	UCC	1-08	11	2	5.50
9	Kieran Collins	Nemo Rangers	0-11	11	3	3.66

In a single game

Rank	Player	County	Tally	Total	Opposition
1	Tony Goulding	St. Finbarr's	3-00	9	Duhallow
1	Frank O'Sullivan	St. Nicholas'	2-03	9	Carrigdhoun
1	Billy Field	St. Michael's	1-06	9	Avondhu
1	Tony Murphy	Carbery	0-09	9	Nemo Rangers
5	Noel Dunne	Muskerry	1-05	8	Millstreet
5	Christy Kearney	UCC	1-05	8	Na Piarsaigh
5	Denis Collins	Dohenys	1-05	8	Macroom
5	Billy Field	St. Michael's	0-08	8	UCC
9	Éamonn O'Donoghue	St. Michael's	2-01	7	Avondhu
9	Noel Murphy	Bishopstown	2-01	7	Clonakilty
9	Dermot MacCurtain	St. Michael's	1-04	7	Millstreet
9	Jimmy Barry-Murphy	St. Finbarr's	1-04	7	Duhallow
9	Donal Hunt	Bantry Blues	1-04	7	Beara
9	Dermot MacCurtain	St. Michael's	0-07	7	Millstreet

=== Miscellaneous ===
- St. Finbarr's won first title in 17 years.
- St. Michael's qualify for their first final.
- This was the first final to be played at the newly built Páirc Uí Chaoimh.
