= Willie O'Neill (Cork hurler) =

Irish hurler and Gaelic footballer

Personal information
- Native name: Liam Ó Néill (Irish)
- Nickname: Billy
- Born: 30 August 1876 Glanmire, County Cork, Ireland
- Died: 24 April 1963 (aged 86) Glanmire, County Cork, Ireland
- Occupation: Farmer

Sport
- Sport: Hurling
- Position: Forward
Clubs
- Years: Club
- William O'Brien's; Sarsfields
Club titles
- Cork titles: 0
Inter-county
- Years: County
- 1902-1910: Cork
Inter-county titles
- Munster titles: 4
- All-Irelands: 2

William O'Neill (30 August 1876 – 24 April 1963) was an Irish hurler and Gaelic footballer who played for Cork Championship clubs William O'Brien's and Sarsfields. He was also a member of the Cork senior teams as a dual player for over a decade during which time he usually lined out as a forward.

== Honours ==
Cork

- All-Ireland Senior Hurling Championship (2): 1902, 1903
- Munster Senior Hurling Championship (4): 1902, 1903, 1904, 1905
- Munster Senior Football Championship (2): 1899, 1901
