= 1916 Cork Junior Hurling Championship =

Irish hurling competition

- Champions: Cobh (3rd title)
- Runners-up: Funcheon Vale

The 1916 Cork Junior Hurling Championship was the 22nd staging of the Cork Junior Hurling Championship since its establishment by the Cork County Board in 1895.

The final was played on 22 April 1917 at the Athletic Grounds in Midleton, between Cobh and Funcheon Vale, in what was their first ever meeting in the final. Cobh won the match by 9-01 to 6-02 to claim their third championship title overall and a first championship title in three years.

== Results ==
=== Final ===
22 April 1917 Final	Cobh	9-01 - 6-02	Funcheon Vale	Midleton Athletic Grounds
