= James Meehan =

James Meehan may refer to:

- James Meehan (surveyor) (1774–1826), Irish-Australian explorer and surveyor
- James Meehan (lumberman) (1834–1920), American lumberman and member of the Wisconsin State Assembly
- James Leo Meehan (1891–1943), American film director and screenwriter
- Jim Meehan (James Michael Meehan, 1952–2018), American professional poker player

== See also ==
- Jim Meehan (footballer) (1935–1988), Australian rules footballer
