= 1894 Cork Senior Football Championship =

Gaelic football competition

- Champions: Nil Desperandum (1st title)
- Runners-up: Kinsale Blacks & Whites

The 1894 Cork Senior Football Championship was the eighth staging of the Cork Senior Football Championship since its establishment by the Cork County Board in 1887.

Dromtarriffe were the defending champions.

Nils won the championship following a 1–13 to 0–01 defeat of Kinsale Blacks & Whites in the final. This was their first ever championship title.

== Results ==
=== Final ===
Final	Nils	1-13 - 0-01	Kinsale Blacks & Whites

== Statistics ==
=== Miscellaneous ===
- Nils win the championship for the first time.
- Kinsale Blacks & Whites qualify for the final for the first time.
