= 1968 Cork Intermediate Football Championship =

Gaelic football competition

- Teams: 12
- Champions: Cobh (3rd title)
- Runners-up: St. Vincent's

The 1968 Cork Intermediate Football Championship was the 33rd staging of the Cork Intermediate Football Championship since its establishment by the Cork County Board in 1909. The draw for the opening round fixtures took place on 28 January 1968.

The final was played on 13 October 1968 at the Athletic Grounds in Cork, between Cobh and St. Vincent's, in what was their first ever meeting in the final. Cobh won the match by 1-12 to 1-06 to claim their third championship title overall and a first title in 52 years.

== Results ==
=== Final ===
13 October 1968 Final	Cobh	1-12 - 1-06	St. Vincent's	Cork Athletic Grounds
	M Sloane 1-2, G Ward 0-4, S O'Connor 0-3, C O'Donovan 0-1, T Meaney 0-1, P Cronin 0-1.		D O'Regan 1-1, J Regan 0-1, C Gregory 0-1, V Kelleher 0-1, P Barry 0-1, C O'Shea 0-1.	Referee: J Dennigan (Fermoy)
