= Joe Meehan =

Australian rules footballer, born 1911

Personal information
- Full name: Harold James Meehan
- Born: 5 April 1911; Collingwood, Victoria
- Died: 29 July 1967 (aged 56); Fitzroy, Victoria
- Original team: Dandenong
- Height: 180 cm (5 ft 11 in)
- Weight: 85 kg (187 lb)

Playing career^{1}
Years	Club	Games (Goals)
1932	Hawthorn	5 (0)
1934–38	Camberwell (VFA)	62 (40)
1938	South Melbourne	2 (0)
- ^{1} Playing statistics correct to the end of 1938.

Harold James "Joe" Meehan (5 April 1911 – 29 July 1967) was an Australian rules footballer who played with Hawthorn and South Melbourne in the Victorian Football League (VFL).

Meehan was the younger brother of Fitzroy player Tom Meehan.

Meehan played 62 games with Camberwell Football Club from 1934 to 1938.
