= John Meehan (priest) =

Canadian Jesuit priest, historian and academic

John Meehan SJ is a Canadian Jesuit priest, historian and academic. He is Director of the Bill Graham Centre for Contemporary International History at Trinity College, University of Toronto. He was president and vice-chancellor of the University of Sudbury in Sudbury, Ontario, Canada from September 2019 until 2021. He was formerly rector of the Church of the Gesù in Montreal and president of Campion College in Regina, Saskatchewan, Canada.

== Education ==
He has a PhD from the University of Toronto, and a B.A. in history and Russian studies from McGill University. He speaks English, French, Russian and Japanese.
