= Peter Mehegan =

American politician

Member of New Hampshire House of Representatives for Merrimack County's 12th district
- Incumbent
- Assumed office December 4, 2024
- Succeeded by: Mariana Beer (elect)

Personal details
- Party: Republican

Peter L. Mehegan is an American politician. He is a member of the New Hampshire House of Representatives.

== Controversies ==
In January 2026, during a public forum on education policy in Pembroke, Mehegan discussed state education spending and special education costs. According to the Concord Monitor, Mehegan said, “When special ed can’t be capped, you’ve got a cancer that you’re applying a band-aid to,” while arguing that structural changes were needed to address education funding challenges. The remark drew attention as part of a broader, contentious discussion about public education policy in New Hampshire.
