= 1954 Cork Junior Football Championship =

Irish hurling competition

- Champions: Glanworth (1st title)
- Runners-up: Delaney Rovers

The 1954 Cork Junior Football Championship was the 56th staging of the Cork Junior Football Championship since its establishment by the Cork County Board in 1895.

The final was played on 28 November 1954 at Riverstown Sportsfield in Glanmire, between Glanworth and Delaney Rovers, in what was their first ever meeting in the final. Glanworth won the match by 1–06 to 1–02 to claim their first ever championship title.

== Results ==
=== Final ===
28 November 1954 Final	Glanworth	1–06 – 1–02	Delaney Rovers	Riverstown Sportsfield
