= 1927 Cork Intermediate Hurling Championship =

Irish hurling competition

- Champions: Cobh (2nd title); D. O'Connell (captain)
- Runners-up: Fr Matthew Hall; D. Falvey (captain)

The 1927 Cork Intermediate Hurling Championship was the 18th staging of the Cork Intermediate Hurling Championship since its establishment by the Cork County Board.

The final was played on 15 January 1927 at Riverstown Sportsfield, between Fr Mathew Hall and Cobh, in what was their first ever meeting in the final. Fr Mathew Hall won the match by 3–02 to 1–01, however, a subsequent objection by Cobh regarding an illegal player was upheld and they were declared the champions. Buttevant were later declared runners-up as they had also objected to Fr Mathew Hall on the same grounds following their semi-final defeat.

== Results ==
=== Final ===
15 January 1928 Final	Fr Matthew Hall	3-02 - 1-01 (declared void)	Cobh	Riverstown Sportsfield
