= 1956 Cork Senior Football Championship =

Gaelic football competition

- Dates: 8 April – 25 November 1956
- Teams: 23
- Champions: St Finbarr's (1st title); Bob Nutty (captain)
- Runners-up: Millstreet; Mick Byrne (captain)

Tournament statistics
- Matches played: 24
- Goals scored: 77 (3.21 per match)
- Points scored: 298 (12.42 per match)

The 1956 Cork Senior Football Championship was the 68th staging of the Cork Senior Football Championship since its establishment by the Cork County Board in 1887. The draw for the first round fixtures took place on 22 January 1956. The championship ran from 8 April to 25 November 1956.

Lees were the defending champions, however, they were beaten by Millstreet in the semi-finals.

The final was played on 25 November 1956 at the Athletic Grounds in Cork, between first-time finalists St Finbarr's and Millstreet. St Finbarr's won the match by 3-05 to 0-04 to claim their first ever championship title.

== Results ==
=== First round ===
8 April 1956 First round	Garda	4-02 - 1-06	Bandon	Innishannon Grounds

8 April 1956 First round	Avondhu	0-06 - 1-12	Collins	Fitzgerald Park

8 April 1956 First round	St Finbarr's	4-07 - 1-03	Glanworth	Fitzgerald Park

22 April 1956 First round	Delaney Rovers	0-03 - 0-02	Canovee	Macroom Grounds

22 April 1956 First round	Seandún	2-07 - 0-09	Darrara	Kinsale Grounds

29 April 1956 First round	Carrigdhoun	2-01 - 3-09	Clonakilty	Kinsale Grounds

22 April 1956 First round	Carbery	2-06 - 1-09	Glanmire	Bandon Grounds

27 May 1956 First round replay	Carbery	0-10 - 2-01	Glanmire	Bandon Grounds

- Imokilly, Beara, Millstreet, Duhallow, St Nicholas', University College Cork, Lees, Macroom and St Vincent's received a bye in this round.

=== Second round ===
29 April 1956 Second round	St Nicholas'	6-08 - 3-03	Duhallow	Banteer Grounds

6 May 1956 Second round	Lees	4-04 - 2-10	University College Cork	Cork Athletic Grounds

6 May 1956 Second round	Macroom	2-09 - 2-08	St Vincent's	Coachford Sportsfield

20 May 1956 Second round	Delaney Rovers	0-09 - 1-03	Imokilly	Riverstown Sportsfield

20 May 1956 Second round	Millstreet	1-08 - 1-06	Beara	Bantry Grounds

20 May 1956 Second round replay	Lees	2-04 - 0-09	University College Cork	Cork Athletic Grounds

6 July 1956 Second round	Garda	1-07 - 1-08	Collins	The Mardyke

8 July 1956 Second round	Seandún	1-03 - 3-07	Clonakilty	Skibbereen Grounds

26 August 1956 Second round	St Finbarr's	2-09 - 2-05	Carbery	Clonakilty Grounds

=== Quarter-finals ===
20 August 1956 Quarter-final	Clonakilty	1-08 - 0-07	Delaney Rovers	Macroom Grounds

9 September 1956 Quarter-final	St Finbarr's	3-06 - 4-02	Collins	Cork Athletic Grounds

9 September 1956 Quarter-final	Lees	1-07 - 0-05	Macroom	Coachford Sportsfield

21 October 1956 Quarter-final	Millstreet	2-05 - 0-04	St Nicholas'	Macroom Grounds

=== Semi-finals ===
30 September 1956 Semi-final	St Finbarr's	4-10 - 1-04	Clonakilty	Cork Athletic Grounds

11 November 1956 Semi-final	Millstreet	0-12 - 1-06	Lees	Coachford Sportsfield

=== Final ===
25 November 1956 Final	St Finbarr's	3-05 - 0-04	Millstreet	Cork Athletic Grounds
				Attendance: 14,000; Referee: T Crowley (Clonakilty)
