= Matt Rea (Gaelic footballer) =

Irish Gaelic footballer

Personal information
- Native name: Maitiú Ó Riabhaigh (Irish)
- Born: 10 April 1873 Glenroe, County Limerick, Ireland
- Died: 10 November 1942 (aged 69) Dundrum, Dublin, Ireland
- Occupation: Civil servant

Sport
- Sport: Gaelic football
Club
- Years: Club
- Geraldines
Club titles
- Dublin titles: 2
Inter-county
- Years: County
- 1898-1899: Dublin
Inter-county titles
- Leinster titles: 2
- All-Irelands: 2

Matthew Rea (10 April 1873 – 10 November 1942) was an Irish Gaelic footballer. His championship career at senior level with the Dublin county team lasted two seasons from 1898 until 1899.

Born in Glenroe, County Limerick, Rea was born to David and Mary Rea (née Keating). He was educated locally before moving to Dublin where he worked as a civil servant.

After moving to Dublin, Rea helped establish the Geraldines club in 1896. As well as being a founder-member he also became a regular member of the senior team and won back-to-back county football championship medals in 1898 and 1899.

Rea made his debut on the inter-county scene as a member of the Dublin senior football team during the 1898 championship. As captain of the team he won back-to-back All-Ireland medals in 1898 and 1899. Rea also won two Leinster medals.

Rea died from mouth cancer at the age of 69 on 10 November 1942. His grandnephew, Ned Rea, was an All-Ireland medal winner as a hurler with Limerick.

== Honours ==
Geraldines

- Dublin Senior Football Championship (2): 1898, 1899

Dublin

- All-Ireland Senior Football Championship (2): 1898 (c), 1899 (c)
- Leinster Senior Football Championship (1): 1898 (c), 1899 (c)

Sporting positions
Preceded by P. J. Walsh	Dublin Senior Football Captain; 1889-1899	Succeeded by
Achievements
Preceded by P. J. Walsh	All-Ireland Senior Football Final winning captain 1898-1899	Succeeded by Jack Tobin
