= 1957 Cork Senior Football Championship =

Gaelic football competition

- Dates: 7 April – 10 November 1957
- Teams: 21
- Champions: St. Finbarr's (2nd title); Bob Nutty (captain)
- Runners-up: Lees

Tournament statistics
- Matches played: 21
- Goals scored: 44 (2.1 per match)
- Points scored: 236 (11.24 per match)

The 1957 Cork Senior Football Championship was the 69th staging of the Cork Senior Football Championship since its establishment by the Cork County Board in 1887. The draw for the first round fixtures took place on 20 January 1957. The championship ran from 7 April to 10 November 1957.

St Finbarr's were the defending champions.

The final, a replay, was played on 10 November 1957 at the Athletic Grounds in Cork, between St Finbarr's and Lees, in what was their first ever meeting in the final. St Finbarr's won the match by 0–08 to 0–05 to claim their second consecutive championship title.

== Results ==
=== First round ===
| 7 April 1957 First round | Lees | 2-03 - 0-06 | St Michael's | Cork Athletic Grounds |

| 7 April 1957 First round | Bandon | 2-04 - 0-06 | Carrigdhoun | Innishannon Grounds |

| 14 April 1957 First round | Garda | 3-05 - 0-04 | Duhallow | Banteer Grounds |

| 28 April 1957 First round | St Vincent's | 0-03 - 1-09 | Macroom | Coachford Sportsfield |

| 12 May 1957 First round | Avondhu | 2-08 - 2-03 | Carbery | Cork Athletic Grounds |

- Clonakilty, Imokilly, Delaney Rovers, St Nicholas', Muskerry, Beara, Collins, Millstreet, Seandún, St Finbarr's and University College Cork received a bye in this round.

=== Second round ===
| 7 April 1957 Second round | Beara | 0-08 - 0-07 | Collins | Bantry Grounds |

| 21 April 1957 Second round | Imokilly | 1-04 - 0-05 | Delaney Rovers | Midleton Grounds |

| 28 April 1957 Second round | Millstreet | 1-11 - 2-04 | Seandún | Coahcford Sportsfield |

| 12 May 1957 Second round | St Finbarr's | 3-07 - 1-05 | University College Cork | The Mardyke |

| 19 May 1957 Second round | Muskerry | 2-04 - 0-06 | St Nicholas' | Coachford Sportsfield |

| 19 May 1957 Second round | Macroom | 2-06 - 1-02 | Clonakilty | Bandon Grounds |

| 26 May 1957 Second round | Lees | 0-07 - 0-05 | Bandon | Ballinhassig Grounds |

| 18 August 1957 Second round | Avondhu | 0-11 - 1-03 | Garda | Riverstown Sportsfield |

=== Quarter-finals ===
| 23 June 1957 Quarter-final | Beara | 3-06 - 0-03 | Muskerry | Sam Maguire Park |

| 25 August 1957 Quarter-final | St Finbarr's | 2-05 - 1-05 | Millstreet | Bishop McEgan Parl |

| 1 September 1957 Quarter-final | Macroom | 3-07 - 0-07 | Imokilly | Cork Athletic Grounds |

| 1 September 1957 Quarter-final | Lees | 2-02 - 0-07 | Avondhu | Bishop Casey Memorial Park |

=== Semi-finals ===
| 29 September 1957 Semi-final | Lees | 1-07 - 0-09 | Macroom | Cork Athletic Grounds |

| 29 September 1957 Semi-final | St Finbarr's | 1-06 - 1-05 | Beara | Clonakilty Grounds |

=== Final ===
| 27 October 1957 Final | St Finbarr's | 2-04 - 2-04 | Lees | Cork Athletic Grounds |
| | P Lougheed 1-1, T Cronin 1-0, L McGrath 0-3. | | J Browne 1-0, T Riordan 1-0, M Cahill 0-1, C Duggan 0-1, P Hanley 0-1, W Walsh 0-1. | Attendance: 10,000; Referee: T Crowley (Clonakilty) |

=== Final replay ===
| 10 November 1957 Final replay | St Finbarr's | 0-08 - 0-05 | Lees | Cork Athletic Grounds |
| | L McGrath 0-4, R Nutty 0-2, D Murphy 0-1, T O'Shaughnessy 0-1. | | D Hurley 0-1, J Brown 0-1, T Riordan 0-1, P Murphy 0-1, E Donoghue 0-1. | Attendance: 11,700; Referee: T Crowley (Clonakilty) |
