= McMeekin =

McMeekin may refer to:

- Clark McMeekin, joint pseudonym of American authors Dorothy Clark and Isabel McMeekin
- Douggie McMeekin, English actor
- Duncan McMeekin (born 1955), justice of Supreme Court of Queensland
- Isabel McMeekin (1895–1973), American author under the pseudonym Clark McMeekin
- Richard McMeekin, Ontario, Canada politician
- Sean McMeekin (born 1974), American historian
- Ted McMeekin (born 1948), Ontario, Canada politician
- Terence McMeekin (1918–1984), lieutenant general in the British Army
- Thomas McMeekin (1866–1946), British sailor and 1908 Olympic Champion

== See also ==
Variations on the surname:

- Meehan
- Mehigan, Meighan and Meighen
