= Jim Meehan (footballer) =

Australian rules footballer (1935–1988)

Personal information
- Full name: Jim Meehan
- Born: 30 June 1935
- Died: 16 December 1988 (aged 53)
- Height: 183 cm (6 ft 0 in)
- Weight: 81 kg (179 lb)

Playing career^{1}
Years	Club	Games (Goals)
1958	Richmond	5 (2)
- ^{1} Playing statistics correct to the end of 1958.

Jim Meehan (30 June 1935 – 16 December 1988) was a former Australian rules footballer who played with Richmond in the Victorian Football League (VFL).
