= 1914 Cork Senior Football Championship =

Gaelic football competition

- Champions: Lees (10th title)
- Runners-up: Youghal

The 1914 Cork Senior Football Championship was the 28th staging of the Cork Senior Football Championship since its establishment by the Cork County Board in 1887.

Macroom were the defending champions.

On 26 July 1914, Lees won the championship following a 2–05 to 1–02 defeat of Youghal in the final. This was their 10th championship title overall and their first title since 1911.

== Results ==
=== Final ===
26 July 1914 Final	Lees	2-05 - 1-02	Youghal	Cork Athletic Grounds

== Statistics ==
=== Miscellaneous ===
- Youghal qualify for the final for the first time.
