= 1904 Cork Senior Football Championship =

Irish sporting event

- Champions: Lees (6th title)
- Runners-up: Fermoy

The 1904 Cork Senior Football Championship was the 18th staging of the Cork Senior Football Championship since its establishment by the Cork County Board in 1887.

Lees were the defending champions.

Lees won the championship following a defeat of Fermoy in the final at Cork Park. This was their sixth title overall and their third title in succession.

== Championship statistics ==
=== Miscellaneous ===
- Lees become the first club to win three titles in a row.
