= 1916 Cork Intermediate Football Championship =

Gaelic football competition

- Champions: Cobh (1st title)
- Runners-up: Macroom

The 1916 Cork Intermediate Football Championship was the eighth staging of the Cork Intermediate Football Championship since its establishment by the Cork County Board in 1909.

The final, a replay, was played on 18 March 1917 at the Athletic Grounds in Cork, between Cobh and Macroom, in what was their first ever meeting in the final. Cobh won the match by 5–03 to 2–01 to claim their first ever championship title.

== Results ==
=== Final ===
4 February 1917 Final	Cobh	0-02 - 0-02	Macroom	Cork Athletic Grounds

=== Final replay ===
18 March 1917 Final replay	Cobh	5-03 - 2-01	Macroom	Cork Athletic Grounds
