= All-Ireland Colleges Interprovincial Hurling Championship =

Hurling competition

- Irish: Craobh Iomána Coláistí na hÉireann
- Code: Hurling
- Founded: 1927
- Abolished: 1956
- Region: Ireland (GAA)
- No. of teams: 3
- Last Title holders: Munster (24th title)
- First winner: Munster
- Most titles: Munster (24 titles)

The All-Ireland Colleges Interprovincial Championship, was an annual inter-provincial hurling competition organised by the Gaelic Athletic Association. It was the highest inter-provincial colleges hurling competition in Ireland, and was contested every year from 1927 to 1956.

The All-Ireland final, usually held in March or April, served as the culmination of a knockout series of games featuring Connacht, Leinster and Munster. At its peak, it was one of the most prestigious colleges competitions in Gaelic games, with players regarding it as a great honour to be included on their provincial team.

The title was won at least once by all three provinces, with only Leinster and Munster winning the competition more than one. The all-time record-holders are Munster, who appeared in every final and won the competition 24 times.

== History ==
Inter-colleges hurling competitions had been played since 1918, with the Leinster Championship and Dr Harty Cup both being formed that year. Both these competitions ended with the respective provincial finals and there was no All-Ireland series. In 1927, the Railway Cup inter-provincial competition for senior inter-county players was inaugurated after the Great Southern Railways sponsored a trophy. A similar competition was also arranged at colleges level that year. Following the completion of the respective Leinster and Munster competitions, a series of trials were held to pick a "best of" team from both provinces. The very first match took place at Croke Park on 7 May 1927, with Munster beating Leinster by 4–03 to 0–03 to claim the inaugural title. Connacht made their first appearance in the competition in a semi-final on 25 March 1934 when they incurred a 6–07 to 2–00 defeat by Munster.

== Roll of honour ==
#	Team	Wins	Years won	Losses	Years lost
1	Munster	24	1927, 1928, 1929, 1930, 1931, 1932, 1933, 1935, 1936, 1937, 1939, 1942, 1943, 1944, 1945, 1946, 1947, 1948, 1949, 1951, 1952, 1953, 1955, 1956	6	1934, 1938, 1940, 1941, 1950, 1954
2	Leinster	5	1934, 1938, 1940, 1950, 1954	22	1927, 1928, 1929, 1930, 1931, 1932, 1933, 1935, 1936, 1937, 1939, 1943, 1944, 1945, 1946, 1947, 1948, 1949, 1952, 1953, 1955, 1956
3	Connacht	1	1941	2	1942, 1951

== List of finals ==
Year	Winners	Score	Runners-up	Score	Venue
1927	Munster	4-03	Leinster	0-03	Croke Park
1928	Munster	7-01	Leinster	5-03	The Mardyke
1929	Munster	8-06	Leinster	5-00	Nowlan Park
1930	Munster	2-03	Leinster	1-04	Waterford Sportsfield
1931	Munster	6-01	Leinster	4-02	Nowlan Park
1932	Munster	4-02	Leinster	4-00	Nowlan Park
1933	Munster	4-04	Leinster	3-01	Nowlan Park
1934	Leinster	5-06	Munster	3-01	Nowlan Park
1935	Munster	5-07	Leinster	4-04	The Mardyke
1936	Munster	4-03	Leinster	3-05	Nowlan Park
1937	Munster	2-05	Leinster	3-00	The Mardyke
1938	Leinster	3-07	Munster	2-05	Nowlan Park
1939	Munster	5-06	Leinster	2-04	The Mardyke
1940	Leinster	6-11	Munster	4-04	Nowlan Park
1941	Connacht	2-03	Munster	0-01	Croke Park
1942	Munster	7-05	Connacht	0-02	The Mardyke
1943	Munster	9-08	Leinster	3-05	The Mardyke
1944	Munster	7-01	Leinster	3-03	Nowlan Park
1945	Munster	4-03	Leinster	0-04	Nowlan Park
1946	Munster	7-04	Leinster	3-09	Croke Park
1947	Munster	2-05	Leinster	2-03	Croke Park
1948	Munster	2-08	Leinster	3-04	Thurles Sportsfield
1949	Munster	4-01	Leinster	3-02	Nowlan Park
1950	Leinster	6-04	Munster	4-06	Thurles Sportsfield
1951	Munster	3-05	Connacht	0-03	Galway Sportsfield
1952	Munster	0-13	Leinster	2-05	Nowlan Park
1953	Munster	4-05	Leinster	1-08	Waterford Sportsfield
1954	Leinster	1-08	Munster	1-05	Croke Park
1955	Munster	12-03	Leinster	2-06	Thurles Sportsfield
1956	Munster	7-11	Leinster	0-02	Croke Park

== Records and statistics ==
=== Final ===
- Most wins: 24:
  - Munster (1927, 1928, 1929, 1930, 1931, 1932, 1933, 1935, 1936, 1937, 1939, 1942, 1943, 1944, 1945, 1946, 1947, 1948, 1949, 1951, 1952, 1953, 1955, 1956)
- Most consecutive wins: 8:
  - Munster 1942, 1943, 1944, 1945, 1946, 1947, 1948, 1949)
- Most second-place finishes: 22:
  - Leinster (1927, 1928, 1929, 1930, 1931, 1932, 1933, 1935, 1936, 1937, 1939, 1943, 1944, 1945, 1946, 1947, 1948, 1949, 1952, 1953, 1955, 1956)
- Most consecutive second-place finishes: 7:
  - Leinster (1927, 1928, 1929, 1930, 1931, 1932, 1933)
  - Leinster (1943, 1944, 1945, 1946, 1947, 1948, 1949)
- Most appearances: 30:
  - Munster (1927, 1928, 1929, 1930, 1931, 1932, 1933, 1934, 1935, 1936, 1937, 1938, 1939, 1940, 1941, 1942, 1943, 1944, 1945, 1946, 1947, 1948, 1949, 1950, 1951, 1952, 1953, 1954, 1955, 1956)

=== Teams ===
==== Gaps ====
Longest gaps between successive championship titles:

- 10 years: Leinster (1940-1950)
- 4 years: Leinster (1934-1938)
- 4 years: Leinster (1950-1954)
