= 1907 Cork Junior Hurling Championship =

Irish hurling competition

- Champions: Cobh (1st title)
- Runners-up: Aghabullogue

The 1907 Cork Junior Hurling Championship was the 13th staging of the Cork Junior Hurling Championship since its establishment by the Cork County Board in 1895.

The final was played on 12 January 1908 at the Athletic Grounds in Cork, between Cobh and Aghabullogue, in what was their first ever meeting in the final. Cobh won the match by 5-13 to 0-02 to claim their first ever championship title.

== Results ==
=== Final ===
12 January 1908 Final	Cobh	5-13 - 0-02	Aghabullogue	Cork Athletic Grounds
