= Owen Sexton =

Irish Gaelic footballer

Personal information
- Native name: Eoin Ó Seasnáin (Irish)
- Born: 1975 (age 50–51) Kilbrittain, County Cork, Ireland
- Occupation: Chemical engineer
- Height: 5 ft 10 in (178 cm)

Sport
- Sport: Gaelic football
- Position: Centre-back
Club
- Years: Club
- Kilbrittain
Club titles
- Cork titles: 0
Inter-county
Years	County	Apps (scores)
1997-2008	Cork	31 (1-3)
Inter-county titles
- Munster titles: 3
- All-Irelands: 0
- NFL: 1
- All Stars: 0

Owen Sexton (born 1975) is an Irish retired Gaelic footballer who played as a centre-back for the Cork senior team.

Born in Kilbrittain, County Cork, Sexton first played competitive Gaelic football whilst at school at Hamilton High School, Bandon. He arrived on the inter-county scene at the age of seventeen when he first linked up with the Cork minor team, winning a Minor football All-Ireland medal in 1993, before later lining out with the under-21 side. He made his senior debut in the 1997 championship. Sexton went on to play a key role for the team for over a decade, winning three Munster medals and one National Football League medal. He was an All-Ireland runner-up on two occasions. He won a Senior football county medal with Carbery in 2004 with a 'Man of the Match' performance from Full Back. He won a county medal in Junior B football with Kilbrittain in 1993, 2009 (Captain) and 2016. He has appeared in two Junior 'A' West Cork finals with Kilbrittain in 1993 and 2017. He also played an important part with Kilbrittain, winning an Intermediate hurling county title in 2010.

Throughout his career Sexton made 31 championship appearances for Cork. He retired from inter-county football following the conclusion of the 2008 championship.

In retirement from play Sexton has become involved in coaching and team management. In 2013 he was named as a selector as part of Brian Cuthbert's management.

Sporting positions
Preceded by Colin Corkery	Cork Senior Football Captain; 2005	Succeeded by Derek Kavanagh
