= Tom Meehan (footballer, born 1909) =

Australian rules footballer (1909–1957)

Personal information
- Full name: Thomas Martin Meehan
- Born: 11 March 1909; Beaufort, Victoria
- Died: 24 April 1957 (aged 48); Parkville, Victoria
- Height: 177 cm (5 ft 10 in)
- Weight: 77 kg (170 lb)

Playing career^{1}
Years	Club	Games (Goals)
1928	Fitzroy	5 (0)
- ^{1} Playing statistics correct to the end of 1928.

Thomas Martin Meehan (11 March 1909 – 24 April 1957) was an Australian rules footballer who played with Fitzroy in the Victorian Football League (VFL).

== Family ==
The son of Thomas Michael Meehan (1884-1960), and Ellen Mary Meehan (1887-194), née O'Callaghan, Thomas Martin Meehan was born at Beaufort, Victoria on 11 March 1909.

He married Julia Irene Punch (1909-1977) on 1 March 1930.

== Football ==
=== Williamstown (VFA) ===
He played his first game for the Williamstown First XVIII, at the age of 17, on 12 June 1926.

=== Fitzroy (VFL) ===
He was eventually cleared from Williamstown to Fitzroy in June 1928.

=== Williamstown (VFA) ===
He was cleared from Fitzroy to Williamstown in April 1929.

== Death ==
He died at Parkville, Victoria on 24 April 1957.
