= 1899 All-Ireland Senior Football Championship =

Football championship

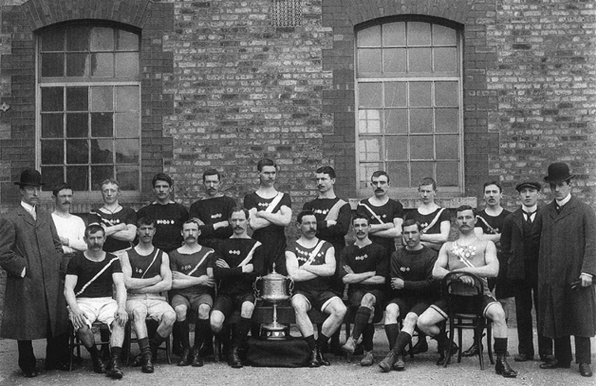

All-Ireland Champions
- Winning team: Dublin (6th win)
- Captain: Matt Rea

All-Ireland Finalists
- Losing team: Cork

Provincial Champions
- Munster: Cork
- Leinster: Dublin
- Ulster: Not played
- Connacht: Not played

Championship statistics

The 1899 All-Ireland Senior Football Championship was the 13th staging of Ireland's premier Gaelic football knock-out competition. Dublin were the winners, completing the first three-in-a-row.

== Results ==
=== Leinster ===
1901
Quarter-Final

Kilkenny	0–2 – 0–10	Dublin

Kilkenny

28 July 1901
Quarter-Final

Kildare	1–2 – 2–5	Laois

Portarlington

28 October 1900
Semi-Final

Offaly	lost – won	Wexford

Jones's Road, Dublin

1901
Semi-Final

Dublin	7–11 – 0–3	Laois

Jones's Road, Dublin

13 January 1901
Final

Dublin	1–7 – 0–3	Wexford

Jones's Road, Dublin

=== Munster ===
1900
Quarter-Final

Waterford	0–5 – 1–3	Kerry

Turners Cross

13 May 1900
Quarter-Final

Cork	w.o.	Clare

Cork Park

15 July 1900
Semi-Final

Cork	w.o.	Waterford

Cork Park

1900
Semi-Final

Tipperary	w.o.	Limerick

14 October 1900
Final

Cork	0–1 – 2–1 unfinished	Tipperary

Tipperary
Referee: P.J. Hayes, Limerick

The match finished at half time, as the Cork ball had burst, and Tipperary did not have a ball.

18 November 1900
Final Replay

Cork	1–2 – 0–1 unfinished	Tipperary

Limerick
Referee: P.J. Hayes, Limerick

Tipperary refused to take the field for the second half. They asked that their score in the first match be added to their first half score in this match.

17 November 1901
Final 2nd Replay

Cork	3–11 – 0–1	Tipperary

Limerick
Referee: J.Wall (W)

=== Final ===
10 February 1901

Dublin	1–10 – 0–6	Cork

Jones's Road, Dublin
Attendance: 2,000
Referee: L Stanley (Louth)

== Statistics ==
- It was a first three-in-a-row for Dublin as All-Ireland champions.
