= P. D. Mehigan =

Irish sportsman and journalist

Patrick D. Mehigan (17 March 1884 – 4 December 1965) was an Irish sportsman and journalist. Mehigan was born in Ardfield, County Cork, to Denis and Margaret (Peg, née Donovan).

He played hurling with Robert Emmets GAA and with the London senior inter-county team in the early 1900s.

Mehigan later served as the leading Gaelic games journalist from the 1920s until the 1940s. He wrote several histories of the Gaelic Athletic Association and was correspondent for the Cork Examiner under the pseudonym Carbery. Mehigan was the correspondent for a match between Cork and Tipperary that was one of the first matches to be broadcast over radio that helped generate increased publicity for hurling as a sport. He was one of the most widely read sports correspondents of his era.

Mehigan also wrote for The Irish Times under the byline Pat O.
