= Cobh GAA =

Irish hurling and football club

Cobh
- An Cóbh
- Founded: 1905
- County: Cork
- Colours
- Grounds: Páirc Uí Chonaill

Playing kits
Standard colours

Senior Club Championships
	All Ireland	Munster champions	Cork champions
Football:	0	0	2

Cobh Hurling & Football Club is a Gaelic Athletic Association club in Cobh, County Cork, Ireland. The club is affiliated to the East Cork Board and fields teams in both hurling and Gaelic football.

== History ==
Located in the town of Cobh, on the south coast of County Cork, Cobh GAA Club was established in 1905. Prior to this, Gaelic games had been played since the early years of the Gaelic Athletic Association by a number of different clubs in the Great Island area, including Cove Michael Davitts, Cove Nationals and Cove Gaelic Football Club.

Cobh GAA initially operated in the junior grades, winning the Cork JHC title in 1907 and the Cork JFC title in 1908. This was followed by the Cork IFC title in 1909. Cobh, arguably, had one of their most successful years in 1916, when the Cork IHC-IFC double was won, as well as a second Cork JHC title. After securing senior status, Cobh beat Fermoy and Youghal to win back-to-back Cork SFC titles in 1918 and 1919.

The club slipped down through the various grades, however, further junior and intermediate titles were won at various intervals in both codes. By the turn of the 20th century, Cobh was competing in the various East Cork competitions.

== Honours ==
- Cork Senior Football Championship (2): 1918, 1919
- Cork Intermediate Hurling Championship (3): 1916, 1927, 1963
- Cork Intermediate Football Championship (3): 1909, 1916, 1968
- Cork Junior Hurling Championship (5): 1907, 1913, 1916, 1926, 1959
- Cork Junior Football Championship (3): 1901, 1908, 1954
- East Cork Junior A Hurling Championship (4): 1926, 1959, 1985, 2025
- East Cork Junior A Football Championship (9): 1944, 1947, 1953, 1954, 1955, 1956, 1960, 1988, 2022
- Cork Junior B Inter-Divisional Football Championship (1): 2017
- Cork Minor Hurling Championship (1): 1917
- Cork Minor C Hurling Championship (1): 2015
- Cork Minor Football Championship (1): 1919
- Cork Minor A Football Championship (1): 1994
- Cork Minor C Hurling Championship (1): 2009

== Notable players ==
- Derek Barrett: All-Ireland SHC-winner (1999)
- Bill Higgins: All-Ireland SHC-winner (1926)
