= Nil Desperandum GAA =

Gaelic games club in County Cork, Ireland

Nil Desperandum
- County: Cork
- Nickname: Nils

Senior Club Championships
	All Ireland	Munster champions	Cork champions
Football:	0	0	6

Nil Desperandum F.C. was a sporting club in Cork, Ireland. When it was founded it was mainly a rugby club. In 1888, after "some years" of playing rugby "Nils", as they were known, played their first Gaelic football game.

Within a few years Nils was one of the strongest Gaelic Athletic Association clubs in Cork. It had a headquarters on Marlboro' Street and was largely represented by West Cork men who had come to the city to work.

After winning the Cork Senior Football Championship in 1894, Nils went on to represent Cork in the controversial All-Ireland Senior Football Championship of 1894.

By the late 1920s the club was almost defunct and at the 1929 AGM the chairman "exhorted every member present both individually and collectively to strive earnestly for the welfare of the club whose motto was 'Nil Desperandum' and bring all possible honors to the club and to the county this year. He stressed the fact that Gaelic Football was in a deplorable state in the city at the present time, and teams of long connection with the GAA like Nils and Lees, found it almost impossible to put a single senior team on the field when a couple of years back they could put senior, intermediate and junior teams. There was certainly work for an organiser here to organise Gaelic football in Cork City and help to bring it back to the high position in the GAA which it held some years back."

== History ==
=== Honours ===
- Cork Senior Football Championships: 6
  - 1894, 1901, 1915, 1917, 1924, 1925
- Cork Junior Football Championships: 7
  - 1902, 1903, 1904, 1912, 1913, 1914, 1915,

== Famous players ==
- Tom Irwin
- Seán Óg Murphy
- Jack Young
- Dick Fitzgerald
