= Lees GAA =

Gaelic games club in County Cork, Ireland

Lees
- Laoi
- Founded: 1886
- County: Cork
- Colours: Red and black
- Grounds: The Marina, Cork

Playing kits
Standard colours

Senior Club Championships
	All Ireland	Munster champions	Cork champions
Football:	0	0	12

Lees Football Club is a defunct Cork-based Gaelic Athletic Association club on the southside of Cork city, Ireland. The club was founded in 1886 and was primarily concerned with the game of Gaelic football. The club had a strong association with the Lee Rowing Club and the teams were largely made up of West Cork men working in the city.

1. By the late 1920s the club was almost defunct and at the 1929 AGM of a rival club, Nils, the chairman "stressed the fact that Gaelic Football was in a deplorable state in the city at the present time, and teams of long connection with the GAA like Nils and Lees, found it almost impossible to put a single senior team on the field when a couple of years back they could put senior, intermediate and junior teams. There was certainly work for an organiser here to organise Gaelic football in Cork City and help to bring it back to the high position in the GAA which it held some years back."
2. Lees spent 111 years on top of the Cork SFC Roll of Honour

—including 98 consecutive years—and were only passed by Nemo Rangers in 2002. Their total of 111 years is the fourth best in SFC history behind Commercials Limerick (122 years), Tullamore GAA (115 years) and Ballina Stephenites (115 years).

== History ==
=== Honours ===
- All-Ireland Senior Football Championships: 1
  - 1911
- Cork Senior Football Championships: 12
  - 1887, 1888, 1896, 1902, 1903, 1904, 1907, 1908, 1911, 1914, 1923, 1955

=== Famous players ===
- Nealie Duggan
- Donal Hurley
- Mick Mehigan
- P. A. Murphy
- Mort O'Shea
- Donal O'Sullivan
- Pádraig Tyers
