= 1887 Cork Senior Football Championship =

Gaelic football competition

- Dates: 6 March 1887 – 10 July 1887
- Teams: 6
- Champions: Lees (1st title); William Daly (captain)
- Runners-up: Lisgoold; William Ring (captain)

Tournament statistics
- Matches played: 6
- Goals scored: 2 (0.33 per match)
- Points scored: 13 (2.17 per match)

The 1887 Cork Senior Football Championship was the inaugural staging of the Cork Senior Football Championship since its establishment by the Cork County Board. The draw for the opening round fixtures took place on 30 January 1887. The championship began on 6 March 1887 and ended on 10 July 1887.

On 10 July 1887, Lees won the championship following a 0–04 to 0–01 defeat of Lisgoold in the final at Cork Park. The club subsequently represented Cork in the 1887 All-Ireland Championship.

== Participation ==
All clubs in County Cork were invited to participate in the inaugural championship. The closing date for entries was 29 January 1887. The cost of entering a team was 2s 6d.

== Results ==
First round

6 March 1887 First round	Emmets	0-00 - 0-00	Lees	Cork Park

20 March 1887 First round replay	Emmets	0-00 - 1-02	Lees	Cork Park

20 March 1987 First round	Carrignavar	1-01 - 0-02	Glanmire	Cork Park

3 July 1887 First round refixture	Lisgoold	0-01 - 0-00 (aet)	Midleton	Cork Park

Semi-final

17 April 1887 Semi-final	Lees	1-02 - 0-00	Carrignavar	Cork Park

- Lisgoold received a bye in this round as Blarney did not field a team as originally planned.

Final

10 July 1887 Final	Lees	0-04 - 0-01	Lisgoold	Cork Park

== Championship statistics ==
=== Miscellaneous ===
- The first round match between Lisgoold and Midleton on 15 May 1887 was declared null and void and a replay was ordered. The replay, which ended in a draw after regulation time, was the first ever championship match to feature extra-time. Two fifteen-minute periods were played after the initial hour.
