= 2026 Cork Premier Intermediate Football Championship =

Annual hurling competition season

- Dates: 24 July – 31 October 2026
- Teams: 12
- Sponsor: McCarthy Insurance Group
- Champions: Uíbh Laoire (1st title); Cathal Vaughan (captain); John McNulty (manager)
- Runners-up: Kiskeam; Thomas Casey (captain); Dan Cronin (manager)
- Relegated: Glanmire

Tournament statistics
- Matches played: 24
- Goals scored: 68 (2.83 per match)
- Points scored: 683 (28.46 per match)
- Top scorer: Chris Óg Jones (6–33)

The 2026 Cork Premier Intermediate Football Championship was the 21st staging of the Cork Premier Intermediate Football Championship since its establishment by the Cork County Board in 2006. The draw for the group stage placings took place on 9 December 2025. The championship ran from 24 July to 31 October 2026.

The final was played on 31 October 2026 at SuperValu Páirc Uí Chaoimh in Cork, between Uíbh Laoire and Kiskeam, in what was their first ever meeting in the final. Uíbh Laoire won the match by 4-22 to 0-23 to claim their first ever championship title.

Uíbh Laoire's Chris Óg Jones was the championship's top scorer with 6–33.

== Team changes ==
=== To Championship ===
Relegated from the Cork Senior A Football Championship

- Fermoy

Promoted from the Cork Intermediate A Football Championship

- Ballinora

=== From Championship ===
Promoted to the Cork Senior A Football Championship

- Aghabullogue

Relegated to the Cork Intermediate A Football Championship

- Bandon

== Group 1 ==
=== Group 1 table ===
Semi-finalist Quarter-finalist Relegation playoff

Team	Matches				Score			Pts
Team	Pld	W	D	L	For	Against	Diff	Pts
Uíbh Laoire	3	3	0	0	77	46	31	6
Rockchapel	3	1	1	1	39	51	-12	3
Bantry Blues	3	1	0	2	55	65	-10	2
Glanmire	3	0	1	2	53	62	-9	1

=== Group 1 results ===
24 July 2026 Round 1	Glanmire	3-10 - 4-15	Uíbh Laoire	Jack Fitzgerald Memorial Park
	H Browne 1-1 (1-0 pen), J Kingston, B Galvin 1-0 each, C Hackett (1 2pt), S O’Driscoll (1 2pt), H Cogan (1 2pt) 0-2 each, D Murray, T Hourihan, D Molden 0-1 each.	Report	C Óg Jones 3-4 (0-1f), I Jones 0-5 (1 2pt), S O’Riordan 1-1, S Pickering 0-4 (1 2pt), J Sweeney 0-2.

25 July 2026 Round 1	Bantry Blues	1-12 - 0-17	Rockchapel	Páirc Uí Chuana
	A Coakley (0-5, tpf, 1f, 1’45), O O’Neill (1-1), R Deane (0-3, tpf, 1f), D McCarthy, K Casey and S McSweeney (0-1 each)	Report	J McAuliffe, M McAuliffe (0-3 each), C Casey (tpf), C Curtin (2fs), J Curtin, S Hickey, and S Walsh (0-2 each), P Curtin (0-1 each)

15 August 2026 Round 2	Uíbh Laoire	3-18 - 2-12	Bantry Blues	Páirc Traolach Mac Suibhne
	C Óg Jones 1-8, C Vaughan 1-3, I Jones 1-2, S Pickering 0-4 (2 2pt), J Sweeney 0-1.	Report	A Coakley 1-4 (0-2 f), M Óg O’Sullivan 1-0, J Sheedy 0-2, O O’Neill, K Casey, R Deane (f), B Sheehan, P Cronin, C Cronin 0-1 each.

16 August 2026 Round 2	Rockchapel	0-13 - 0-13	Glanmire	Fr Con Buckley Park
	M McAuliffe 0-4, S Hickey 0-3, J Walsh 0-2 (1 2pt), Ciarán Curtin 0-2 (0-1 f), J McAuliffe, D Linehan 0-1 each.	Report	C O'Neill 0-5 (2 2pt f, 0-1 45), B O'Mahony 0-3, D Molden, H Jones 0-2 each, H Browne 0-1.

12 September 2026 Round 3	Glanmire	1-18 - 4-10	Bantry Blues	Clonakilty GAA Complex
	C O’Neill 0-8 (3 2ptf, 0-2f), H Cogan 0-5 (0-1f), D Lynch 0-3, H Browne 1-0 (1-0 pen), B O’Mahony (0-1f), D Murray 0-1 each.	Report	A Coakley 2-3 (1-0 pen, 0-2f), J O’Neill, O O’Neill 1-0 each, D Sheedy 0-3 (1 2pt), R Deane 0-2 (1 2pt), D McCarthy, J O’Neill 0-1 each.

12 September 2026 Round 3	Uíbh Laoire	2-17 - 0-09	Rockchapel	Banteer Sportsfield
	C Óg Jones 0-6, C Vaughan 0-6 (1 tpf, 1tp, 1f), J Sweeney 1-1, I Jones `1-1, T Roberts, K Manning, S O’Leary 0-1 each.	Report	C Curtin 0-4 (1tpf, 1f), J Walsh 0-3 (1tp), S Hickey, M McAuliffe 0-1 each.

== Group 2 ==
=== Group 2 table ===
Semi-finalist Quarter-finalist Relegation playoff

Team	Matches				Score			Pts
Team	Pld	W	D	L	For	Against	Diff	Pts
Kiskeam	3	2	1	0	56	49	7	5
Macroom	3	1	1	1	47	41	6	3
Aghada	3	1	1	1	45	47	-2	3
Castletownbere	3	0	1	2	47	58	-11	1

=== Group 2 results ===
25 July 2026 Round 1	Kiskeam	1-14 - 2-11	Aghada	Páirc Eoin Mhic Charthaigh
	S O’Sullivan 0-6 (1 2pt, 1f) P O’Callaghan 0-5 (2 45, 1 2pt), J Daly 1-0, S Meehan 0-2, S O’Riordan 0-1.	Report	J McKenna, C Hegarty 1-2 each, D Phelan 0-3, J O’Hanlon 0-2, J O’Donoghue, J Colbert 0-1 each.

25 July 2026 Round 1	Macroom	1-13 - 1-13	Castletownbere	Wolfe Tone Park
	E O'Leary 1-1, O O'Sullivan 0-3, D Twomey 0-3, P Lucey 0-2, T Dineen 0-2, M Corrigan 0-1, D Creedon 0-1.		F Fenner 1-6, D Dunne 0-3, J Spencer 0-2, U Murphy 0-1, L Kelly 0-1.

14 August 2026 Round 2	Aghada	0-08 - 1-13	Macroom	Éire Óg Grounds
	T Hartnett, J O’Hanlon (1 free), D Byrne (tp) (0-2 each); D Phelan, C Hegarty (45) (0-1 each).	Report	P Lucey (0-7, 1tp, 1tpf, 3 frees); A Quinn (1-2); T Dineen (tp), J Murphy (tp) (0-2 each).

16 August 2026 Round 2	Castletownbere	1-14 - 1-19	Kiskeam	Inchigeelagh Grounds
	F Fenner 0-11, L Kelly 1-0, J Spenser 0-1, G Murphy 0-1, D Dunne 0-1.		S O'Sullivan 0-8, J Daly 1-0, T Casey 0-2, P O'Callaghan 0-2, S O'Riordan 0-2, S Meehan 0-2, AJ O'Connor 0-1, M Casey 0-1, D Murphy 0-1.

12 September 2026 Round 3	Kiskeam	1-14 - 1-12	Macroom	Kanturk Grounds
	S O’Riordan 1-1, S O’Sullivan 0-5 (0-1 f, 1 2pt), M Cronin 0-4, A Carroll 0-2 (1 2pt), Mike Casey, Maurice Casey 0-1 each.	Report	D Twomey 1-0, A Quinn 0-7 (2 2pt), P Lucey (f), E O’Leary, D Horgan, T Dineen, M Corrigan 0-1 each.

12 September 2026 Round 3	Aghada	3-11 - 0-14	Castletownbere	Rossmore Grounds

== Group 3 ==
=== Group 3 table ===
Quarter-finalist

Team	Matches				Score			Pts
Team	Pld	W	D	L	For	Against	Diff	Pts
Fermoy	3	2	0	1	61	65	-4	4
Naomh Abán	3	2	0	1	62	55	7	4
Ballinora	3	1	0	2	59	61	-2	2
Nemo Rangers	3	1	0	2	60	61	-1	2

=== Group 3 results ===
25 July 2026 Round 1	Naomh Abán	1-16 - 0-20	Fermoy	Dr Croke Park
	E Mir 1-6 (1 x 2ptrf), D O'Ceallaigh 0-4 (1 x 2pt), D O'Laoire 0-4 (1 x 2pt), C O'Donnchu 0-1, W MacCarthaigh 0-1.	Report	B Twomey 0-10 (2 x 2ptr. 0-1f), D Lardner 0-4 (1 x 2ptf, 0-2f), S Aherne 0-2, M Brennan 0-2, G O'Callaghan 0-1, D Daly 0-1.

26 July 2026 Round 1	Nemo Rangers	1-15 - 1-17	Ballinora	Éire Óg Grounds
	D O’Leary 0-5 (2 2ptf, 0-1 f), D O’Sullivan 0-5, C O’Conovan 1-0, D O’Connor 0-3, J Horgan, D Coughlan 0-1 each.	Report	R Quirke 1-5 (1 2pt, 0-1f), M Quirke 0-4, S Kingston (1 2pt), I Quirke, K Werner 0-2 each, M O’Brien, J Keohane 0-1 each.

14 August 2026 Round 2	Fermoy	3-10 - 4-13	Nemo Rangers	Glenville Grounds
	D Lardner 2-2 (2f), A Aherne 1-2, S Aherne, M Brennan, F Lardner (1 2pt) 0-2 each.	Report	D O’Sullivan 2-2 (2f), C O’Neill 1-1, J Coogan 1-1 D O’Leary 0-4 (2 2pt f), C O’Donovan 0-2, D Calnan, J Horgan, M Keenan 0-1 each.

15 August 2026 Round 2	Ballinora	2-12 - 3-12	Naomh Abán	Carrigadrohid Grounds
	S Kingston 0-6 (2 2ptf), I Quirke 1-1, M O’Brien 1-0, K Werner (2f), M Quirke 0-2 each, J Keohane 0-1.	Report	E Ó Mír 0-5 (1 2pt, 0-2f), Dónal Ó Ceallaigh 1-1, D Ó Laoire, P Ó Liatháin 1-0 each, C Ó Donnchú 0-3 (1 2pt), J Hendy 0-2, S Ó Riordáin 0-1.

12 September 2026 Round 3	Naomh Abán	1-19 - 1-14	Nemo Rangers	Páirc Naomh Abán
	E Ó Mír 0-9 (2 2pt, 0-1 f), D Ó Laoire 1-2, Dónal Ó Ceallaigh 0-3, S Ó Ríordáin, C Ó Donnchú, A Ó Luasa, P Ó Liatháin, Dermot Ó Ceallaigh 0-1 each.	Report	D O’Leary 0-5 (2 2pt f, 0-1 f), C Yellend 1-1, C O’Donovan 0-3, E Nation, D Coughlan, O Whyte, J Coogan (f), P Kerrigan 0-1 each.

12 September 2026 Round 3	Fermoy	0-22 - 2-15	Ballinora	Glenville Grounds
	B Twomey 0-7 (1 2pt), D Lardner 0-5 (1 2pt f, 0-3 f), G O’Callaghan 0-4, A Aherne 0-2 (1 2pt), S Aherne, P Murphy, P De Roiste, T Clancy 0-1 each.	Report	M Quirke 2-3, S Kingston 0-3 (0-1 f, 0-1 45), I Quirke 0-3, M O’Brien, K Werner 0-2 each, C O’Donoghue, S O’Neill 0-1 each.

== Relegation stage ==
=== Relegation final ===
26 September 2026 Relegation final	Glanmire	3-06 - 0-17	Castletownbere	Ballinacarriga Grounds
	D Murray 1-2, B O’Mahony, C McCarthy 1-0 each, H Jones 0-3, D Molden 0-1.	Report	D Dunne 0-8 (1 tp), F Fenner 0-6 (1 tp, 1 tpf), G Murphy 0-2, L Kelly 0-1.

== Knockout stage ==
=== Quarter-finals ===
27 September 2026 Quarter-final	Fermoy	1-15 - 0-13	Rockchapel	Dr Croke Park
	B Twomey (1-2, 2pt), D Lardner (0-4 frees), P De Róiste (0-4, 1 2pt), E Healy (0-2), S Aherne, A Aherne and F Lardner (0-1 each).	Report	Ciarán Curtin (0-4, 1 2pt free, 0-1 free), J O’Callaghan, F Murphy (2pt free) and J Walsh (0-2 each), S Curtin, D Lenihan and J McAuliffe (0-1 each).

27 September 2026 Quarter-final	Macroom	0-14 - 6-10	Naomh Abán	Páirc Uí Chuana
	A Quinn 0-6 (1 2ptf), E O’Leary 0-3, S Kiely (1 2pt), T Dineen 0-2 each, D Creedon 0-1.	Report	Donal Ó Ceallaigh 3-3, A Ó Luasa, S Ó Riordáin 1-1 each, E Ó Mír 1-0, Dermot Ó Ceallaigh 0-3, D Ó Laoire (1 2pt) 0-2.

=== Semi-finals ===
11 October 2026 Semi-final	Uíbh Laoire	1-14 - 0-14	Naomh Abán	Castle Grounds
	C Óg Jones 1-5, I Jones 0-3, C O’Leary, S O’Riordan 0-2 (2pt) each, C Vaughan, C Galvin 0-1 each.	Report	E Ó Mír 0-4 (0-2f), D Ó Laoire 0-3 (1 2ptf), Donal Ó Ceallaigh 0-2f, D Ó Loingsigh, C Ó Donnchú, A Ó Luasa, D Ó Ceallaigh, C Ó Críodáin 0-1 each.

11 October 2026 Semi-final	Kiskeam	1-14 - 0-16 (aet)	Fermoy	Mallow GAA Complex
	S O’Sullivan 0-8 (2 tpf), D Fitzgerald 1-0, P O’Callaghan (0-2 f), T Casey 0-2 each, M Cronin (f), D Scannell 0-1 each.	Report	B Twomey 0-7 (1 tp, 0-3 f, 0-1 45), D Lardner 0-4 (0-1 f), S Aherne 0-3 (tp), P de Róiste 0-2 (tp).

=== Final ===
31 October 2026 Final	Uíbh Laoire	4-22 - 0-23	Kiskeam	SuperValu Páirc Uí Chaoimh
	C Óg Jones 1-10 (1 2pt, 0-1 m), I Jones 3-2 (0-1 f), C Vaughan (0-4 45), S Pickering (1 2pt) 0-4 each, J Sweeney, C Galvin 0-1 each.	Report	S O’Sullivan 0-7 (0-2 f, 1 2pt f), P O’Callaghan (2 2pt), T Casey (2 2pt) 0-5 each, D Fitzgerald, S O’Riordan 0-2 each, M Casey, J O’Connor 0-1 each.	Referee: R Whelan (Aghada)

== Championship statistics ==
=== Top scorers ===
Rank	Player	Club	Tally	Total	Matches	Average
1	Chris Óg Jones	Uíbh Laoire	6-33	51	5	10.20
2	Fintan Fenner	Castletownbere	1-32	35	4	8.75
3	Seán O'Sullivan	Kiskeam	0-34	34	5	6.80
4	Ed Mir	Naomh Abán	2-24	30	5	6.00
5	Ben Twomey	Fermoy	1-26	29	5	5.80
6	Ian Jones	Uíbh Laoire	5-13	28	5	5.60
7	Donal Ó Ceallaigh	Naomh Abán	4-13	25	5	5.00
7	David Lardner	Fermoy	2-19	25	5	5.00
9	Arthur Coakley	Bantry Blues	3-12	21	3	7.00
10	Alan Quinn	Macroom	1-15	18	4	4.50

=== Miscellaneous ===
- The Ballinora and Fermoy group 3 match was incorrectly recorded by the referee as having ended in a draw. Fermoy launched an objection, which was upheld by the Cork County Board. As a result of this, the game was officially recorded as a one-point win for Fermoy.
