= 2019 Cork Premier Intermediate Football Championship =

- Dates: 6 April 2019 – 27 October 2019
- Teams: 15
- Sponsor: The Echo
- Champions: Éire Óg (1st title); Daniel Goulding (captain); Harry O'Reilly (manager)
- Runners-up: St Michael's

Tournament statistics
- Matches played: 25
- Top scorer(s): Daniel Goulding

The 2019 Cork Premier Intermediate Football Championship was the 14th staging of the Cork Premier Intermediate Football Championship since its establishment by the Cork County Board in 2006. The draw for the opening round fixtures took place 15 January 2019. The championship began on 6 April 2019 and ended on 27 October 2019.

On 27 October 2019, Éire Óg won the championship following a 0–14 to 0–12 defeat of St Michael's in the final at Páirc Uí Rinn. It was their first championship title in the grade.

Éire Óg's Daniel Goulding was the championship's top scorer.

== Team changes ==
=== To Championship ===
Promoted from the Cork Intermediate Football Championship

- Cill na Martra

Relegated from the Cork Senior Football Championship

- Aghada

=== From Championship ===
Promoted to the Cork Senior Football Championship

- Fermoy

== Results ==
=== Preliminary round ===
7 April 2019 Preliminary round	Bantry Blues	2-10 - 0-12	Nemo Rangers	Kilmurry
	T Foley 1-4, K Casey 1-0, S Murray 0-3, S O'Neill 0-2, E O'Shea 0-1.		R Dalton 0-4, A Greaney 0-2, J Coogan 0-1, C Dalton 0-1, C Kiely 0-1, R Wyse 0-1, J O'Donovan 0-1, L Horgan 0-1.

=== Round 1 ===
6 April 2019 Round 1	Bandon	3-14 - 1-19	Newmarket	Castle Grounds
	B Collins 1-3, M Sugrue 0-5 (0-1'45, 0-1f), J Walsh 1-1, J Mulcahy 1-0, E O'Donovan 0-2, R Crowley 0-1, P Murphy 0-1, P Crowley 0-1.	Report	D Culloty 1-7 (0-7f), C O'Keeffe 0-7 (0-5f), TJ Bodie 0-1, M Cottrell 0-1; D O'Keeffe 0-1, A Browne 0-1, P Browne 0-1.

7 April 2019 Round 1	Aghada	1-12 - 0-16	Na Piarsaigh	Páirc Uí Rinn
	C Terry 1-0, A Barry 0-3, D Creedon 0-2, T Hartnett 0-2, C Fleming 0-2, P O'Neill 0-1, C O'Driscoll 0-1, S McBennett 0-1.		C O'Mahony 0-6, A Hogan 0-4, S Forde 0-3, A Higgins 0-1, K Buckley 0-1, D Gunning 0-1.

7 April 2019 Round 1	St Michael's	3-12 - 1-14	Macroom	Ovens
	L O'Sullivan 1-3, K Hegarty 1-2, A Hennessy 1-0, A Murphy 0-2, N Cashman 0-2, D Linehan 0-1, E Hegarty 0-1, T Deasy 0-1.		P Lucey 0-5, C O'Sullivan 1-1, A Quinn 0-1, F Goold 0-1, J Murphy 0-1, D Horgan 0-1, T Dineen 0-1, A Hegarty 0-1, E O'Gorman 0-1, D Twomey 0-1.

7 April 2019 Round 1	Castletownbere	1-16 - 0-19	Kanturk	Ballingeary
	D Hegarty 0-6, D Fenton 1-1, G Murphy 0-4, J Harrington 0-3, A O'Sullivan 0-2.		I Walsh 0-9, K Holland 0-3, L McLoughlin 0-2, M Healy 0-2, P Walsh 0-1, J McLoughlin 0-1, C Clernon 0-1.

14 April 2019 Round 1	Cill na Martra	1-09 - 0-08	Éire Óg	Castle Grounds
	M Ó Deasúna 0-4, S Ó Duinnín 1-0, D Ó Conaill 0-2, M Ó Duinnín 0-1, C Ó Duinnín 0-1, D Ó Duinnín 0-1.		D Goulding 0-5, E O'Shea 0-2, R O'Toole 0-1.

14 April 2019 Round 1	Naomh Abán	1-09 - 2-12	Béal Átha'n Ghaorthaidh	Castle Grounds
	M Ó Duinnín 0-4, C Ó Críodáin 1-0, D Ó Ceallaigh 0-3, D Ó hAileamhnáin 0-1, M Ó Liatháin 0-1.		A Ó Coinceannáin 1-4, D Mac Thomáis 1-3, D Ó Ceallacháin 0-1, L Ó Conchúir 0-1, C Ó Duinnín 0-1, C Ó Loingsigh 0-1, C Ó Tuama 0-1.

27 April 2019 Round 1	Bantry Blues	3-11 - 1-16	St Vincent's	St Mary's Park
	T Foley 1-4, K Casey 1-1, D Daly 1-1, S O'Neill 0-2, R Deane 0-1, S O'Leary 0-1, S Murray 0-1.		JP Murphy 0-7, B Murphy 0-4, P O'Sullivan 1-0, G Kelleher 0-3, G McCarthy 0-1, A Hart 0-1.

28 April 2019 Round 1 replay	Kanturk	4-09 - 1-10	Castletownbere	Ballingeary
	D O'Connell 2-1, I Walsh 1-2, C Clernon 1-1, L O'Neill 0-3, K Holland 0-1, J Browne 0-1.		R Dillane 1-0, G Murphy 0-3, D Hegarty 0-2, J Harrington 0-2, D Fenton 0-1, R Murphy 0-1, J O'Neill 0-1.

=== Round 2 ===
9 August 2019 Round 2	Naomh Abán	1-10 - 1-13	Newmarket	Duggan Park
	M Ó Duinnín 0-6, N Ó Ceallaigh 1-0, A Ó Luasa 0-2, D Ó Ceallaigh 0-1, M Ó Liatháin 0-1.		C O'Keeffe 1-3, D Culloty 0-4, B O'Connor 0-2, R O'Keeffe 0-2, TJ Brosnan 0-1, T O'Keeffe 0-1.

11 August 2019 Round 2	Castletownbere	0-11 - 5-14	Nemo Rangers	St Mary's Park
	G Murphy 0-6, A O'Sullivan 0-2, O Power 0-1, D Hegarty 0-1, D Dunne 0-1.		J Coogan 2-1, R Dalton 1-3, C Kiely 1-2, L Connolly 0-5, R Wyse 1-0, A Greaney 0-1, J O'Donovan 0-1, C Dalton 0-1.

11 August 2019 Round 2	Éire Óg	3-16 - 1-17 (aet)	Aghada	Mayfield

17 August 2019 Round 2	Macroom	1-16 - 2-11	St Vincent's	Ballincollig
	P Lucey 1-6, D Horgan 0-2, D Creedon 0-2, T Dineen 0-2, M Corrigan 0-1, S Kiely 0-1, D Twomey 0-1, C Dineen 0-1.		B Murphy 1-7, S Duggan 1-1, JP Murphy 0-1, G Kelleher 0-1, A Kingston 0-1.

=== Round 3 ===
31 August 2019 Round 3	Cill na Martra	6-12 - 1-11	Macroom	Ballingeary
	M Ó Deasúna 1-5, D Ó Duinnín 2-0, S Ó Duinnín 1-3, F Ó hÉalaithe 1-0, G Ó Faoláin 1-0, D Ó Conaill 0-2, D Ó hÚrdail 0-1, S Ó Céilleachair 0-1.		P Lucey 1-2, F Goold 0-2, T Dineen 0-2, A Quinn 0-1, D Twomey 0-1, C O'Sullivan 0-1, D Horgan 0-1, S Murphy 0-1.

31 August 2019 Round 3	Nemo Rangers	1-14 - 1-16	Bandon	Páirc Liam Mhic Cárthaigh
	C Kiely 1-1, R Dalton 0-4, A Greaney 0-2, J Coogan 0-2, A Browne 0-2, E Dilloughrey 0-2, J Allen 0-1.		B Collins 1-6, M Sugrue 0-3, R O'Driscoll 0-2, A O'Mahony 0-1, R Crowley 0-1, P Crowley 0-1, C O'Mahony 0-1, P Murphy 0-1.

=== Round 4 ===
17 August 2019 Round 4	Newmarket	2-13 - 2-14	Éire Óg	Mourne Abbey
	D Culloty (1-3, 0-1 free), C O’Keeffe (0-7, 0-3 frees), A Ryan (1-0 pen), K O’Sullivan (0-2), B O’Connor (0-1).	Report	D Goulding (1-8, 0-5 frees), R O’Toole (1-1), K Hallissey and J Murphy (0-2 each), C O’Callaghan (0-1).

=== Quarter-finals ===
20 September 2019 Quarter-final	Na Piarsaigh	2-09 - 1-14	St Michael's	Páirc Uí Rinn
	A Hogan 0-4 f, P Guest, S Forde 1-0 each, K Buckley 0-2 (0-1 f), E Sheehan, C O’Mahony, G Joyce 0-1 each.	Report	D Cremin 1-2, T Deasy 0-4 (0-2 f, 0-2 45), E Hegarty (0-1 f), A Murphy 0-2 each, K Hegarty, E Buckley, B Cain, S O’Keeffe 0-1 each.

21 September 2019 Quarter-final	Cill na Martra	0-13 - 3-08	Kanturk	Duggan Park
	M Ó Deasúna 0-4 (0-2 frees), D Ó hUrdail (0-3), S Ó Duinnín 0-2, D Ó Duinnín, T Ó Corcoran, S Ó Ceallacháin, M Ó Conchúir (0-1 each).	Report	D O’Connell (1-3), P Walsh (0-1), A Walsh (1-0), I Walsh (1-2), M Healy (free), L O’Neill (0-1 each).

22 September 2019 Quarter-final	Bantry Blues	1-13 - 1-13	Bandon	Sam Maguire Park
	T Coughlan (0-5, 5 frees), R Deane (1-1), S Coughlan (0-4), S O’Neill (0-2), B Foley (0-1).	Report	B Collins (1-4), M Sugrue (0-6, 3 frees), A O’Mahony, J Mulcahy and C O’Mahony (0-1 each).

29 September 2019 Quarter-final	Béal Átha'n Ghaorthaidh	1-11 - 2-16	Éire Óg	Castle Grounds
	D Seartan 0-5 (3f); D Mac Thomáis 0-4; B Seartan 1-0; D Ó Ceallacháin, A Ó Coinceannain (f) 0-1 each.	Report	C O’Callaghan 1-4; D Goulding 0-5 (2f, 1 45); B Hurley 1-1; R O’Toole, E O’Shea 0-2 each, K Hallissey, Jack Murphy 0-1 each.

29 September 2019 Quarter-final replay	Bandon	1-12 - 1-14	Bantry Blues	Sam Maguire Park
	M Sugrue 0-7 (4f, 1 45); E O’Donovan 0-3 (1f); J Mulcahy 1-0; A O’Mahony, D Crowley 0-1 each.	Report	S Coughlan 0-6 (5f); T Foley 0-4 (3f); K Coakley 1-0; S O’Neill, S McSweeney, D Daly, R Deane 0-1 each.

=== Semi-finals ===
11 October 2019 Semi-final	St Michael's	1-09 - 0-12	Kanturk	Mallow GAA Complex
	T Deasy (0-6, 0-4 frees), D Lenihan (1-0), T Lenihan, K Hegarty and E Buckley (0-1 each).	Report	I Walsh (0-5 frees), R Walsh (0-3), A Walsh (0-2, 0-1 45), K Holland and D Browne (0-1 each).

12 October 2019 Semi-final	Bantry Blues	3-11 - 2-16	Éire Óg	Ahamilla GAA Complex
	K Casey (2-1), S Coughlan (0-4, 3 frees), S Murray (1-0), R Deane (1 free) and S McSweeney (0-2 each), J Casey and S O’Neill (0-1 each).	Report	D Goulding (0-8, 5 frees), K Hallissey (1-1), B Hurley (1-0), J Murphy (0-2), L Sheehan (1 free), R O’Toole, D Dineen, E O’Sé and J Cooper (0-1 each).

20 October 2019 Semi-final replay	St Michael's	2-11 - 1-04	Kanturk	Páirc Uí Rinn
	T Deasy 1-6 (0-2 frees), L O’Sullivan 1-1, D Lenihan, E Hegarty, K Hegarty, D Cremin 0-1 each.	Report	D O’Connell 1-0, I Walsh 0-2 (frees), P Walsh, M Healy 0-1 each.

=== Finals ===
27 October 2019 Final	Éire Óg	0-14 - 0-12	St Michael's	Páirc Uí Rinn
	D Goulding 0-8 (0-5 f, 0-1 45), C O’Callaghan 0-2, D Dineen, J Cooper, J Murphy, B Hurley 0-1 each.		T Deasy 0-3 (0-1 f), L O’Sullivan 0-3, E Hegarty 0-2 (0-1 f), K Hegarty, B Cain, T Lenihan 0-1 each, D Cremin 0-1 f.	Referee: A Long (Argideen Rangers)

== Championship statistics ==
=== Miscellaneous ===
- Éire Óg win the title for the first time.
- St Michael's became the second team after Clyda Rovers to lose three successive finals. It was also their fifth final defeat in eight championship seasons.
