= 2021 Cork Premier Intermediate Football Championship =

16th staging of the Cork Premier Intermediate Football Championship

- Dates: 4 September - 5 December 2021
- Teams: 12
- Sponsor: Bon Secours Hospital
- Champions: Newmarket (2nd title); T. J. Brosnan (captain); Paul Murphy (manager)
- Runners-up: Kanturk; John McLoughlin (captain); Tim Ryan (manager)
- Relegated: St. Nicholas'

Tournament statistics
- Matches played: 24
- Goals scored: 50 (2.08 per match)
- Points scored: 492 (20.5 per match)
- Top scorer(s): Conor O'Keeffe (0-32)

The 2021 Cork Premier Intermediate Football Championship was the 16th staging of the Cork Premier Intermediate Football Championship since its establishment by the Cork County Board in 2006. The draw for the group stage placings took place on 29 April 2021. The championship began on 4 September 2021 and ended on 5 December 2021.

The final, a Duhallow derby, was played on 5 December 2021 at Páirc Uí Chaoimh in Cork, between Newmarket and Kanturk, in what was their first ever meeting in a final. Newmarket won the match by 0-12 to 0-11 to claim their second championship title overall and their first title in 10 years.

Newmarket's Conor O'Keeffe was the championship's top scorer with 0-32.

== Team changes ==
=== To Championship ===
Promoted from the Cork Intermediate A Football Championship

- Rockchapel

Relegated from the Cork Senior A Football Championship

- St. Nicholas'

=== From Championship ===
Promoted to the Cork Senior A Football Championship

- Knocknagree

Relegated to the Cork Intermediate A Football Championship

- Gabriel Rangers

== Results ==
=== Group A ===
==== Table ====
Advance to play-offs Advance to relegation play-offs

Team	Matches				Score			Pts
Team	Pld	W	D	L	For	Against	Diff	Pts
Kanturk	3	3	0	0	6-31	3-19	21	6
Naomh Abán	3	2	0	1	3-41	4-29	9	4
Macroom	3	1	0	2	4-32	4-34	-2	2
St.Nicholas'	3	0	0	3	1-20	3-42	-28	0

==== Results ====
4 September 2021 Round 1	St. Nicholas'	0-03 - 2-13	Kanturk	Clyda Rovers Grounds
	R Long 0-2 (0-1 f), S O’Callaghan 0-1.	Report	I Walsh 0-6 (0-1 f), P Walsh 0-3, L O’Keefe, Alan Walsh 1-0 each, J Fitzpatrick, L O’Neill, G Bucinskas, L McLoughlin 0-1 each.	Referee: J O'Leary (Mallow)

4 September 2021 Round 1	Macroom	2-10 - 1-18	Naomh Abán	Ballingeary Sportsfield
	S Kiely 2-1 (2-0 penalties), F Goold 0-3 (0-2 f), C O’Donovan, C O’Sullivan, D Creedon, D Horgan, E O’Leary, E O’Gorman 0-1 each.	Report	M Ó Duinín 0-10 (0-7 f), Daniel Ó Ceallaigh 1-2, Diarmuid Ó Ceallaigh, M Ó Liathain 0-2 each, D Ó Laoire, C Ó Críodáin (mark) 0-1 each.	Referee: P O'Leary (Cloughduv)

24 September 2021 Round 2	Naomh Abán	0-18 - 0-10	St. Nicholas'	Éire Óg GAA Grounds
	M Ó Duinnín 0-6 (0-3 f, 0-1 mark), D Ó Laoire 0-3, D Ó Ceallaigh 0-2 (0-1 f), F Walker 0-2 45, É Ó Criodáin, C Ó Criodáin, D Ó Loinsigh, P Ó Liatháin, and D Ó hAileamháin 0-1 each.	Report	Dean Brosnan 0-3 (0-1 f), D Morris 0-2, L Coughlan, R Long 0-1 f each, S O’Callaghan, D Dunlea, C Horgan 0-1 each.	Referee: M Collins (Clonakilty)

25 September 2021 Round 2	Kanturk	2-09 - 1-11	Macroom	Cullen GAA Grounds
	L O’Keeffe 1-1, C Walsh 1-0, A Walsh, L O’Neill 0-2 each, K Holland (f), D Browne, R Walsh, I Walsh (f) 0-1 each.	Report	F Goold 0-4 (0-1 45), M Cronin 1-0, P Lucey 0-2, T Dineen, A Quinn, D Goold, K O’Donovan, S Kiely (f) 0-1 each.	Referee: C Walsh (Nemo Rangers)

16 October 2021 Round 3	St. Nicholas'	1-07 - 1-11	Macroom	Éire Óg GAA Grounds
	R Long (0-3 f) 1-4, D Dunlea, S O’Callaghan, D Brosnan 0-1 each.	Report	P Lucey 1-1, F Goold (0-2 f) 0-3, A Quinn 0-2, S Kiely, B O’Gorman, C O’Sullivan, D Goold, D Horgan 0-1 each.	Referee: E Coleman

16 October 2021 Round 3	Kanturk	2-09 - 2-05	Naomh Abán	Mallow GAA Complex
	I Walsh 1-5 (1-0 pen, 0-1 f); C Walsh 1-3; Aidan Walsh 0-1 45.	Report	Darragh Ó Laoire 2-0; David Ó Ceallaigh 0-2; Dermot Ó Ceallaigh (0-1 f) 0-2 each; C Ó Criodáin 0-1.	Referee: C Walsh (Nemo Rangers)

=== Group B ===
==== Table ====
Advance to play-offs Advance to relegation play-offs

Team	Matches				Score			Pts
Team	Pld	W	D	L	For	Against	Diff	Pts
Cill na Martra	3	3	0	0	4-47	4-22	25	6
Nemo Rangers	3	2	0	1	5-27	3-32	1	4
Rockchapel	3	1	0	2	5-26	3-39	-7	2
St. Vincent's	3	0	0	3	2-21	6-28	-19	0

==== Results ====
5 September 2021 Round 1	Cill an Martra	3-16 - 2-08	Nemo Rangers	Carrigadrohid
	D Ó Duinnín 1-5 (0-1 f), S Ó Duinnín 1-3 (0-1 mark), M Ó Deasúna 0-5 f, C Ó Duinnín 1-2 (0-1 mark), S Ó Foirreidh 0-1.	Report	C O’Donovan 2-2 (0-1 f), A Greaney 0-3 f, B Cripps, S Martin and J Coogan 0-1 each.

5 September 2021 Round 1	St. Vincent's	1-09 - 4-08	Rockchapel	Mallow GAA Complex
	M O’Leary 1-0, B Murphy 0-4 (0-2f) D O’Connor 0-3, W Long, P O’Sullivan (0-1 each).	Report	S Hickey 1-3, J O’Callaghan 1-1 K Collins 1-0, J McAuliffe 1-0, J Curtin, W Murphy, C Curtin, C Keppel (0-1 each).

25 September 2021 Round 2	Cill an Martra	0-19 - 1-08	Rockchapel	Duggan Park
	D Ó Duinnín 0-7 (0-6 f), S Ó Duinnín 0-4 (0-1 f), D Ó hUrdail 0-3 (0-2 f), S Ó Forréidh 0-2, T Ó Corcora, C McLochlainn, C Ó Duinnín 0-1 each.	Report	J Forrest 1-0, J Curtin 0-3 f, J McAulliffe 0-2, L Collins 0-2 f, D O’Callaghan 0-1.	Referee: A Hyland (Kilworth)

26 September 2021 Round 2	Nemo Rangers	1-08 - 0-06	St. Vincent's	Rathpeacon GAA Grounds
	J Coogan 0-4 (0-2 f), K Fulganati 1-0, C O’Donovan 0-2, E Dilloughery, S Martin 0-1 each.	Report	B Murphy 0-4 (0-3 f), S Duggan, D O’Connor 0-1 each.	Referee: B Coniry (Crosshaven)

16 October 2021 Round 3	Nemo Rangers	2-11 - 0-10	Rockchapel	O'Connell Park
	J Coogan 0-5 (0-1 f), K Fulignati 1-1, L Horgan 1-0, E Dilloughery, C Kiely, J O'Donovan, E Mangan, C O'Donovan 0-1 each.	Report	L Collins 0-4 (0-3 f), S Hickey 0-3, K Collins, M McAuliffe, J McAuliffe 0-1 each.

16 October 2021 Round 3	Cill an Martra	1-12 - 1-06	St. Vincent's	Páirc Uí Rinn
	D O hUrdail 0-4 (0-3 f), D MacCarthaigh 1-0, T Corkery 0-2, M O Deasuna 0-2 f, D O Conaill, F O hEarlaithe, M O Duinnin, S O Forreigh 0-1 each.	Report	D O’Connor 1-1, B Murphy 0-3 (0-1 f, 0-1 45), A Harte, P O’Sullivan 0-1 each.	Referee: B Coniry (Crosshaven)

=== Group C ===
==== Table ====
Advance to play-offs

Team	Matches				Score			Pts
Team	Pld	W	D	L	For	Against	Diff	Pts
Aghada	3	2	1	0	4-32	1-34	7	5
Newmarket	3	1	1	1	1-34	1-36	-2	3
Castletownbere	3	1	0	2	2-36	4-28	2	2
Na Piarsaigh	3	1	0	2	3-30	4-34	-7	2

==== Results ====
4 September 2021 Round 1	Newmarket	0-14 - 0-14	Aghada	O'Connell Park
	C O’Keeffe 0-8 (0-2f), R O’Keeffe 0-3, D O’Keeffe, J Ryan, M Cottrell 0-1 each.	Report	D Phelan 0-4, D Creedon 0-4 (0-3f), P O’Neill 0-2 (0-1 mark), K O’Hanlon 0-2, A O’Connell, T Hartnett 0-1 each.	Referee: A Hyland (Kilworth)

5 September 2021 Round 1	Castletownbere	1-16 - 2-08	Na Piarsaigh	St. Mary's Park
	G Murphy 1-6 (0-4 f), T Murphy 0-2, (0-1 45, 0-1 f), J Walsh, D Hanley, D Fenton, F Fenner, D Dunne, B Murphy (f), L Kelly (mark), J O’Neill 0-1 each.	Report	K Buckley 0-6 (0-5 f), P Murphy, P Murphy 1-0 each, K Forde, S Forde 0-1 each.

25 September 2021 Round 2	Na Piarsaigh	0-14 - 0-11	Newmarket	Clyda Rovers GAA Grounds
	K Buckley 0-7 (0-5 f); C Bowen 0-3 (0-1 f); A Keating 0-2; P Guest, K Forde 0-1 each.	Report	C O’Keeffe 0-7 (0-2 f); R O’Keeffe 0-2 f; A Ryan, TJ Brosnan 0-1 each.	Referee: D Daly (Brian Dillons)

25 September 2021 Round 2	Aghada	1-11 - 0-12	Castletownbere	Sam Maguire Park
	D Creedon (0-6, 0-4f); C Fleming (0-3); S Bennett (1-0); A Berry and D Phelan (0-1 each).	Report	T Murphy (0-4, 0-3f); G Murphy (0-3, 0-1f); A O’Sullivan (0-3, 0-1m); F Finner and T Collins (0-1 each).	Referee: A Whelton (Clonakilty)

16 October 2021 Round 3	Aghada	3-07 - 1-08	Na Piarsaigh	Páirc Shéamuis de Barra
	K O’Hanlon 2-1, S Barrett 1-2 (1-0 pen), D Creedon 0-2 f, D Byrne, C Fleming 0-1 each.	Report	E Sheehan 1-0, P Guest 0-3, A Hogan 0-2, K Buckley (f), P Rourke, S Forde, A Keating 0-1 each.	Referee: A Hyland (Kilworth)

16 October 2021 Round 3	Newmarket	1-09 - 1-08	Castletownbere	Sam Maguire Park
	C O’Keefe 0-3 (0-2 f), B O’Connor 0-3, K O’Sullivan 1-0, R O’Keefe (f), D O’Keefe, T Murphy 0-1 each.	Report	G Murphy 0-3 (0-2 f), T Murphy 0-3 (0-1 f), A O’Sullivan 1-0, J Walsh, S McCarthy 0-1 each.	Referee: M Collins (Clonakilty)

=== Relegation stage ===
==== Playoff ====
30 October 2021 Playoff	St. Nicholas'	1-07 - 2-11	St. Vincent's	MTU GAA Grounds

=== Knockout stage ===
==== Quarter-finals ====
30 October 2021 Quarter-final	Naomh Abán	0-10 - 1-16	Newmarket	Millstreet GAA Grounds
	Dermot Ó Ceallaigh 0-4 f, D Ó Laoire 0-3, Danny Ó Ceallaigh 0-2 f, C Ó Criodáin 0-1.	Report	R O’Keeffe 1-4 (0-2 f), C O’Keeffe 0-4 (0-2 f), M Cottrell 0-2, J Ryan, TJ Brosnan, B O’Connor, C Browne, T Murphy, K O’Sullivan 0-1 each.

31 October 2021 Quarter-final	Aghada	1-12 - 1-07	Nemo Rangers	Páirc Uí Rinn
	C Fleming (0-2 f) 1-4, S Bennett 0-4, D Byrne 0-2, P O’Neill, K O’Hanlon 0-1 each.	Report	K Fulignati 1-0, J Coogan (0-2 f) 0-3, E Mangan (0-1 f) 0-2, C O’Donovan 0-1.	Referee: P O'Leary (Cloughduv)

==== Semi-finals ====
13 November 2021 Semi-final	Cill na Martra	0-07 - 2-07	Newmarket	O'Connell Park
	D Ó Duinnín 0-2 (0-1 f), S Ó Forreidh 0-2, M Ó Deasúna, A Ó Cuana, C MacLochlainn 0-1 each.	Report	R O’Keeffe 1-1 (0-1 f), B O’Connor 1-0, C O’Keeffe 0-3 (0-1 f), P Allen, M Cottrell, TJ Brosnan 0-1 each.	Referee: C Dineen (Douglas)

13 November 2021 Semi-final	Kanturk	1-08 - 1-07	Aghada	Clyda Rovers GAA Grounds
	C Clernon 1-1; I Walsh 0-3 (0-2 f); L O’Neill, K Holland 0-2 each.	Report	A Berry 1-1; D Creedon 0-2 f, K O’Shea, K O’Hanlon, P O’Neill, C Fleming 0-1 each.	Referee: J Regan (Lough Rovers)

==== Final ====
5 December 2021 Final	Newmarket	0-12 - 0-11	Kanturk	Páirc Uí Chaoimh
	C O'Keeffe 0-7 (0-3 f), B O'Connor 0-2, P Allen, D O'Keeffe, R O'Keefe 0-1 each.	Report	I Walsh 0-6 (0-4 f), L McLoughlin 0-2, R Walsh, C Walsh, K Holland 0-1 each.	Referee: J Ryan (Macroom)

== Championship statistics ==
=== Top scorers ===
Overall

Rank	Player	Club	Tally	Total	Matches	Average
1	Conor O'Keeffe	Newmarket	0-32	32	6	5.33
2	Ian Walsh	Kanturk	1-21	24	5	4.80
3	Ryan O'Keeffe	Newmarket	2-12	18	5	3.00
4	Dan Dineen	Cill na Martra	1-14	17	3	5.66
5	Mikey Ó Duinnín	Naomh Abán	0-16	16	2	8.00
6	Gary Murphy	Castletownbere	1-12	15	3	5.00
7	Keith Buckley	Na Piarsaigh	0-14	14	3	4.66
7	Danny Creedon	Aghada	0-14	14	5	2.80
9	Darragh Ó Laoire	Naomh Abán	2-07	13	4	3.25
9	Jack Coogan	Nemo Rangers	0-13	13	4	3.25

In a single game

Rank	Player	Club	Tally	Total	Opposition
1	Mikey Ó Duinnín	Naomh Abán	0-10	10	Macroom
2	Gary Murphy	Castletownbere	1-06	9	Na Piarsaigh
3	Conor O'Donovan	Nemo Rangers	2-02	8	Cill na Martra
3	Ian Walsh	Kanturk	1-05	8	Naomh Abán
3	Dan Dineen	Cill na Martra	1-05	8	Nemo Rangers
3	Conor O'Keeffe	Newmarket	0-08	8	Aghada
7	Seán Kiely	Macroom	2-01	7	Naomh Abán
7	Cian Fleming	Aghada	1-04	7	Nemo Rangers
7	Ryan O'Keeffe	Newmarket	1-04	7	Naomh Abán
7	Dan Dineen	Cill na Martra	0-07	7	Rockchapel
7	Keith Buckley	Na Piarsaigh	0-07	7	Newmarket
7	Conor O'Keeffe	Newmarket	0-07	7	Na Piarsaigh
7	Conor O'Keeffe	Newmarket	0-07	7	Kanturk
