= 2008 Cork Premier Intermediate Football Championship =

- Dates: 6 April 2008 – 5 October 2008
- Teams: 16
- Sponsor: Evening Echo
- Champions: St. Finbarr's (1st title); Fionán Murray (captain); Tony Leahy (manager)
- Runners-up: St. Vincent's; Paddy O'Shea (captain); Jason Daly (manager)
- Relegated: Youghal

Tournament statistics
- Matches played: 28
- Goals scored: 33 (1.18 per match)
- Points scored: 538 (19.21 per match)
- Top scorer(s): John Paul Murphy (0-29)

The 2008 Cork Premier Intermediate Football Championship was the third staging of the Cork Premier Intermediate Football Championship since its establishment by the Cork County Board in 2006. The draw for the opening round fixtures took place on 9 December 2007. The championship began on 6 April 2008 and ended on 5 October 2008.

Mallow left the championship after securing promotion to senior level. Grenagh, St. Finbarr's and St. Vincent's joined the championship through a combination of relegation and promotion.

The final, a city derby, was played at Páirc Uí Chaoimh in Cork, between St. Finbarr's and St. Vincent's. After a replay, St. Finbarr's won the final by 2-13 to 0-14 to claim their first championship title in the grade and a first title in any football grade since 1985. It remains their only championship title in the grade.

John Paul Murphy of the St. Vincent's club was the championship's top scorer with 0-29.

== Team changes ==
=== To Championship ===
Promoted from the Cork Intermediate Football Championship

- Grenagh

Relegated from the Cork Senior Football Championship

- St. Finbarr's
- St. Vincent's

=== From Championship ===
Promoted to the Cork Senior Football Championship

- Mallow

== Results ==
=== Round 1 ===
6 April 2008 Round 1	Newmarket	1-13 - 1-10	Kiskeam	Kanturk
	D O'Brien 1-2, J Lane 0-3, J Ryan 0-3, B Daly 0-2, D O'Flynn 0-2, T O'Keeffe 0-1.		J Angland 1-0, N Cronin 0-3, D O'Leary 0-2, D Linehan 0-2, B Dennehy 0-2, J Ryan 0-1.

9 April 2008 Round 1	Béal Átha'n Ghaorthaidh	2-10 - 0-04	Youghal	Páirc Uí Rinn
	A Ó Coinceannáin 1-3, M Ó Tuama 1-1, L Ó Conchúir 0-3, S Ó Tuama 0-3, P Ó Coinceannáin 0-1, C Ó Tuama 0-1.		M Mulcahy 0-1, B Coleman 0-1, J Grace 0-1, R Cunningham 0-1.

9 April 2008 Round 1	St. Vincent's	0-10 - 0-06	Grenagh	Cloughduv
	JP Murphy 0-6, D O'Connor 0-2, P O'Sullivan 0-1, C Barry 0-1.		DD Dorgan 0-4, J O'Neill 0-1, M Kenny 0-1.

10 April 2008 Round 1	St. Michael's	1-09 - 1-08	Glenville	Cloughduv
	M Russell 1-0, W Kennedy 0-2, E Buckley 0-2, J Browne 0-1, K O'Connell 0-1, J Linehan 0-1, M Drummond 0-1, S O'Sullivan 0-1.		K Coakley 0-4, O Curtin 1-0, P Cahill 0-2, D McCarthy 0-1, E O'Reilly 0-1.

13 April 2008 Round 1	Ballinora	2-08 - 0-10	Killavullen	Mallow GAA Complex
	C Brosnan 1-2, M Hodge 1-0, M Murphy 0-3, E Lougheed 0-1, C O'Shea 0-1, G O'Halloran 0-1.		D Dorgan 0-4, J O'Neill 0-2, A O'Driscoll 0-2, D Luddy 0-1, D Hartnett 0-1.

16 April 2008 Round 1	St. Finbarr's	0-16 - 0-11	Mayfield	Páirc Uí Rinn
	F Murray 0-4, J Sexton 0-4, C O'Sullivan 0-3, E Keane 0-1, J O'Donoghue 0-1, R Leahy 0-1, C McCarthy 0-1, R O'Mahony 0-1.		P Condon 0-3, B Hegarty 0-2, E Crowley 0-2, J O'Donovan 0-1, R Scannell 0-1, T Lotty 0-1, D Lucey 0-1.

17 April 2008 Round 1	Clyda Rovers	1-09 - 1-08	Nemo Rangers	Ballincollig
	P Kissane 0-6, C Lane 1-0, D O'Mullane 0-1, J O'Hanlon 0-1, D O'Shea 0-1.		B O'Driscoll 1-2, J Kerins 0-3, W Morgan 0-1, JP O'Neill 0-1, A Morgan 0-1.

18 April 2008 Round 1	Newcestown	0-13 - 0-02	Glanmire	Ballinora
	H Curran 0-4, C Keane 0-3, T Ryan 0-2, T Twomey 0-2, F Keane 0-1, J Crowley 0-1.		D Molden 0-2.

=== Round 2 ===
25 May 2008 Round 2	Glanmire	0-10 - 0-09	Mayfield	Páirc Uí Rinn
	J Murphy 0-8, B Kirby 0-1, M Hopkins 0-1.		T Lotty 0-5, M Barry 0-2, R Scannell 0-1.

25 May 2008 Round 2	Glenville	0-10 - 1-07	Grenagh	Páirc Uí Rinn
	K Coakley 0-6, S O'Leary 0-2, E O'Reilly 0-1, J O'Keeffe 0-1.		DD Dorgan 1-3, S Coleman 0-3, J O'Neill 0-1.

31 May 2008 Round 2	Kiskeam	0-09 - 0-07	Youghal	Mourne Abbey
	D O'Leary 0-4, M O'Herlihy 0-3, B Dennehy 0-1, B O'Leary 0-1.		N Roche 0-3, B Coleman 0-2, P Monaghan 0-1, E Coleman 0-1.

1 June 2008 Round 2	Nemo Rangers	1-10 - 0-07	Killavullen	Castlelyons
	B O'Driscoll 1-2, L O'Sullivan 0-4, D Niblock 0-1, C O'Brien 0-1, W Morgan 0-1, B Twomey 0-1.		A O'Driscoll 0-2, D Hartnett 0-2, D Dorgan 0-2, D Relihan 0-1.

14 June 2008 Round 2 replay	Glenville	0-13 - 1-05	Grenagh	Páirc Uí Chaoimh
	K Coakley 0-4, P O'Brien 0-3, J Halbert 0-2, D McCarthy 0-2, E O'Reilly 0-1, P Cahill 0-1.		M Kenny 1-0, DD Dorgan 0-2, J Russell 0-1, N Doherty 0-1, C Fitzgerald 0-1.

=== Relegation playoffs ===
28 June 2008 Semi-final	Grenagh	3-08 - 2-09	Killavullen	Mourne Abbey
	R Dorgan 2-0, DD Dorgan 1-0, C Fitzgerald 0-2, N Doherty 0-2, S Coleman 0-1, M Kenny 0-1, J Russell 0-1, T Walsh 0-1.		J O'Neill 1-4, D Hartnett 1-0, C O'Connell 0-1, B Norris 0-1, P Hartnett 0-1, A O'Driscoll 0-1, D Relihan 0-1.

11 July 2008 Semi-final	Mayfield	3-10 - 0-03	Youghal	Ballinacurra
	P Condon 1-5, T Tynan 1-1, R Scannell 0-4, E Crowley 1-0.		N Roche 0-2, R Cunningham 0-1.

18 July 2008 Final	Killavullen	2-10 - 1-08	Youghal	Glenville
	J O'Neill 2-3, A O'Driscoll 0-3, D Relihan 0-2, I O'Gorman 0-1, D Hartnett 0-1.		R Cunningham 1-1, V Murray 0-3, N Roche 0-2, B Coleman 0-1, N Farrelly 0-1.

=== Round 3 ===
29 June 2008 Round 3	Ballinora	1-13 - 0-11	St. Michael's	Páirc Uí Rinn
	C Brosnan 0-4, C O'Shea 0-4, K Conway 1-0, C Sheehan 0-3, M Murphy 0-2.		E Buckley 0-4, J Linehan 0-4, S O'Sullivan 0-2, W Kennedy 0-1.

29 June 2008 Round 3	St. Finbarr's	0-13 - 0-06	Nemo Rangers	Páirc Uí Rinn
	R O'Mahony 0-5, F Murray 0-4, C O'Sullivan 0-1, C McCarthy 0-1, R Leahy 0-1, G Leahy 0-1.		W Morgan 0-3, L O'Sullivan 0-1, N O'Sullivan 0-1, A Hogan 0-1.

5 July 2008 Round 3	Newcestown	0-12 - 0-09	Béal Átha'n Ghaorthaidh	Coachford
	H Curran 0-6, J O'Sullivan 0-2, T Twomey 0-1, T Ryan 0-1, P Moloney 0-1, D Twomey 0-1.		A Ó Coinceannáin 0-3, L Seartan 0-2, L Ó Conchúir 0-1, P Ó Coinceannáin 0-1, C Ó Loingsigh 0-1, I Ó Coinceannáin 0-1.

10 July 2008 Round 3	Glanmire	0-10 - 0-09	Clyda Rovers	Glenville
	J Murphy 0-6, M Hopkins 0-2, E Whooley 0-1, M Cussen 0-1.		D O'Shea 0-3, J Hanlon 0-2, J Murphy 0-2, P O'Mullane 0-1, F O'Shea 0-1.

=== Quarter-finals ===
5 July 2008 Quarter-final	Newmarket	1-09 - 0-11	Glenville	Dr. Croke Park
	D O'Flynn 1-1, J Ryan 0-4, J Lane 0-2, TJ Bodie 0-1, M Feehan 0-1.		K Coakley 0-7, N Healy 0-1, P O'Brien 0-1, P Cahill 0-1, J O'Brien 0-1.

13 July 2008 Quarter-final	St. Vincent's	0-16 - 1-05	Kiskeam	Mourne Abbey
	JP Murphy 0-6, C Barry 0-4, J Buckley 0-3, P O'Sullivan 0-2, D O'Connor 0-1.		C Noonan 1-1, B Dennehy 0-2, S O'Leary 0-1, C O'Leary 0-1.

20 July 2008 Quarter-final	Newcestown	1-12 - 0-08	Glanmire	Coachford
	T Twomey 0-5, T Ryan 1-1, H Curran 0-3, C Keane 0-1, J O'Sullivan 0-1, B O'Mahony 0-1.		J Murphy 0-2, D O'Connell 0-2, K Murphy 0-2, M Cussen 0-1, P Barry 0-1.

13 August 2008 Quarter-final	St. Finbarr's	0-15 - 0-11	Ballinora	Páirc Uí Rinn
	F Murray 0-5, R O'Mahony 0-5, C McCarthy 0-2, R Leahy 0-1, R Curran 0-1, C O'Sullivan 0-1.		C O'Shea 0-3, M Murphy 0-2, C Brosnan 0-2, C Healy 0-2, C Sheehan 0-1, G O'Halloran 0-1.

=== Semi-final ===
17 August 2008 Semi-final	St. Vincent's	1-09 - 1-08	Newmarket	Mallow GAA Complex
	D O'Connor 0-4, J Buckley 1-0, JP Murphy 0-3, C Barry 0-2.		J Lane 1-2, J Ryan 0-2, TJ Bodie 0-2, T O'Keeffe 0-1, B Daly 0-1.

6 September 2008 Semi-final	St. Finbarr's	1-14 - 2-07	Newcestown	Páirc Uí Rinn
	C O'Sullivan 1-3, R O'Mahony 0-4, F Murray 0-3, R Curran 0-2, C McCarthy 0-1, R Leahy 0-1.		P Condon 2-0, H Curran 0-3, T Twomey 0-2, P Moloney 0-1, B Moloney 0-1.

=== Finals ===
20 September 2008 Final	St. Finbarr's	0-12 - 1-09	St. Vincent's	Páirc Uí Chaoimh
	R O'Mahony 0-3, R Leahy 0-3, C O'Sullivan 0-2, R Curran 0-2, F Murray 0-2.		C Barry 1-2, P Murphy 0-4, Derek O'Connor 0-1, J Buckley 0-1, D O'Regan 0-1.

5 October 2008 Final replay	St. Finbarr's	2-13 - 0-14	St. Vincent's	Páirc Uí Chaoimh
	R O'Mahony 1-5, R Leahy 1-2, F Murray 0-2, J O'Donoghue 0-1, C O'Sullivan 0-1, R Curran 0-1, G Leahy 0-1.		JP Murphy 0-10, J Buckley 0-2, P Sullivan 0-1, C Barry 0-1.

== Championship statistics ==
=== Top scorers ===
Overall

Rank	Player	Club	Tally	Total	Matches	Average
1	John Paul Murphy	St. Vincent's	0-29	29	5	5.80
2	Robert O'Mahony	St. Finbarr's	1-23	26	6	4.33
3	Kevin Coakley	Glenville	0-21	21	4	5.25
4	Fionán Murray	St. Finbarr's	0-20	20	6	3.66
5	Joe O'Neill	Killavullen	3-09	20	4	5.00
6	James Murphy	Glanmire	0-16	16	4	4.00
6	Hugh Curran	Newcestown	0-16	16	4	4.00
7	D. D. Dorgan	Grenagh	2-09	15	4	3.75
8	Colin O'Sullivan	St. Finbarr's	1-11	14	6	2.33
9	Cian Barry	St. Vincent's	1-10	13	5	2.60

In a single game

Rank	Player	Club	Tally	Total	Opposition
1	John Paul Murphy	St. Vincent's	0-10	10	St. Finbarr's
2	Joe O'Neill	Killavullen	2-03	9	Youghal
3	Paul Condon	Mayfield	1-05	8	Youghal
3	Robert O'Mahony	St. Finbarr's	1-05	8	St. Vincent's
3	James Murphy	Glanmire	0-08	8	Mayfield
4	Joe O'Neill	Killavullen	1-04	7	Grenagh
4	Kevin Coakley	Glenville	0-07	7	Newmarket
5	Raymond Dorgan	Grenagh	2-00	6	Killavullen
5	Pádraig Condon	Newcestown	2-00	6	St. Finbarr's
5	Aindrias Ó Coinceannáin	Béal Átha'n Ghaorthaidh	1-03	6	Youghal
5	Donal Dorgan	Grenagh	1-03	6	Glenville
5	Colin O'Sullivan	St. Finbarr's	1-03	6	Newcestown

=== Miscellaneous ===
- St. Finbarr's win their first Intermediate title.
