= 2011 Cork Premier Intermediate Football Championship =

- Dates: 7 May 2011 – 5 November 2011
- Teams: 16
- Sponsor: Evening Echo
- Champions: Newmarket (1st title); Barry O'Leary (captain); Danny Culloty (manager)
- Runners-up: Clyda Rovers
- Relegated: Grenagh

Tournament statistics
- Matches played: 32
- Goals scored: 38 (1.19 per match)
- Points scored: 596 (18.63 per match)
- Top scorer(s): Nicky Flanagan (1-24)

The 2011 Cork Premier Intermediate Football Championship was the sixth staging of the Cork Premier Intermediate Football Championship since its establishment by the Cork County Board in 2006. The draw for the opening round fixtures took place on 11 December 2010. The championship began on 7 May 2011 and ended on 5 November 2011.

Newcestown and Glanmire left the championship after their respective promotion and relegation to different grades. Macroom and Naomh Abán joined the championship. Grenagh were relegated from the championship after being beaten in a playoff by Newmarket.

The final was played on 16 October 2011 at Páirc Uí Chaoimh in Cork, between Newmarket and Clyda Rovers. Newmarket won the final by 3-06 to 1-10 to claim their first championship title in the grade. It was Clyda Rovers' third successive final defeat.

Newmarket's Nicky Flanagan was the championship's top scorer with 1-24.

== Team changes ==
=== To Championship ===
Promoted from the Cork Intermediate Football Championship

- Macroom

Relegated from the Cork Senior Football Championship

- Naomh Abán

=== From Championship ===
Promoted to the Cork Senior Football Championship

- Newcestown

Relegated to the Cork Intermediate Football Championship

- Glanmire

== Results ==
=== Round 1 ===
7 May 2011 Round 1	Ballinora	0-04 - 0-03	Kiskeam	Clondrohid
	B Ahern 0-2, C O'Shea 0-2.		N Cronin 0-1, D Scannell 0-1, M Herlihy 0-1.

7 May 2011 Round 1	Bantry Blues	1-11 - 1-09	Newmarket	Castle Grounds
	D Barron 0-5, D Power 1-0, G Canty 0-2, J Canty 0-1, M Delaney 0-1, S Coughlan 0-1, S Drummey 0-1.		D O'Flynn 1-2, N Flanagan 0-5, TJ Brosnan 0-1, K O'Sullivan 0-1.

7 May 2011 Round 1	Béal Átha'n Ghaorthaidh	0-10 - 0-08	Carrigaline	Páirc Naomh Eoin
	B Seartan 0-3, L Seartan 0-3, A Ó Coinceannáin 0-2, I Ó Coinceannáin 0-1, N Ó Duinnín 0-1.		D Drake 0-4, P Murphy 0-2, E O'Keeffe 0-1, N Coakley 0-1.

7 May 2011 Round 1	Naomh Abán	0-04 - 0-07	Clyda Rovers	Dromtarriffe
	M Ó Cróinín 0-3, S Mac Cárthaigh 0-1.		C O'Sullivan 0-3, R Carey 0-1, G Carey 0-1, D O'Brien 0-1, P Kissane 0-1.

8 May 2011 Round 1	Grenagh	0-06 - 0-07	Macroom	Páirc Eoin Mhic Charthaigh
	D Dorgan 0-3, S Coleman 0-1, C Fitzgerald 0-1, T Kenny 0-1.		D Goold 0-6, J Goold 0-1.

8 May 2011 Round 1	Glenville	1-05 - 0-10	Mallow	Ballyhooly
	P Cahill 0-4, P Cronin 1-0, J Foley 0-1.		C O'Riordan 0-6, M Roche 0-2, K Sheehan 0-1, J Hayes 0-1.

14 May 2011 Round 1	Nemo Rangers	2-08 - 0-07	St. Vincent's	Páirc Uí Rinn
	D Kearney 1-3, A Morgan 1-1, D Nation 0-2, C Allen 0-1, E Dilloughrey 0-1.		P O'Shea 0-2, D Duggan 0-2, C Barry 0-2, D O'Connor 0-1.

15 May 2011 Round 1	St. Michael's	1-12 - 1-09	Mayfield	Páirc Uí Rinn
	E Buckley 1-3, A O'Connell 0-3, E Hegarty 0-2, W Kennedy 0-2, M Mulconry 0-1, A Neville 0-1.		P Condon 1-5, R Scannell 0-3, N Kelly 0-1.

=== Round 2 ===
4 June 2011 Round 2	St. Vincent's	1-13 - 0-10	Grenagh	Ballyanley
	JP Murphy 0-6, P O'Sullivan 1-0, J Kelleher 0-3, D Duggan 0-2, A Buckley 0-1, D O'Regan 0-1.		DD Dorgan 0-4, T Kenny 0-2, S Coleman 0-2, K Cummins 0-1, J Russell 0-1.

11 June 2011 Round 2	Naomh Abán	1-14 - 1-12 (aet)	Carrigaline	Ovens
	M Ó Cróinín 0-7, S Mac Cárthaigh 1-3, D Ó Súilleabháin 0-2, S Ó Laoire 0-1, A Hankus 0-1.		C Barry 1-0, D Drake 0-3, K Kavanagh 0-1, P Murphy 0-1, E O'Keeffe 0-1, N Coakley 0-1, K McIntyre 0-1, S O'Brien 0-1, B O'Keeffe 0-1, T Murphy 0-1, T O'Sulivan 0-1.

12 June 2011 Round 2	Kiskeam	2-09 - 0-12	Newmarket	Páirc Nóra Ní Iarlaithe
	D Scannell 1-3, D Fitzgerald 1-1, B Dennehy 0-3, N Cronin 0-1, M Herlihy 0-1.		N Flanagan 0-4, TJ Bodie 0-4, K O'Sullivan 0-1, T Murphy 0-1, B O'Leary 0-1, J Ryan 0-1.

19 June 2011 Round 2	Mayfield	3-07 - 0-11	Glenville	Riverstown Sportsfield
	D Grainger 1-1, S Kelly 1-0, P Condon 0-2, D Lucey 0-2, C Bond 0-1, R Scannell 0-1.		P Cahill 0-5, K Coakley 0-2, D Buttimer 0-1, J Foley 0-1, A Cronin 0-1, P Cronin 0-1.

=== Round 3 ===
27 June 2011 Round 3	Grenagh	1-08 - 1-11	Newmarket	Mourne Abbey
	J Russell 1-0, Diarmuid Dorgan 0-2, S Coleman 0-2, T Kenny 0-1, M Kenny 0-1, K Cummins 0-1, A McCarthy 0-1.		N Flanagan 1-5, TJ Bodie 0-2, T O'Keeffe 0-1, D Flynn 0-1, M Reidy 0-1, K O'Sullivan 0-1.

10 July 2011 Round 3	Carrigaline	0-06 - 0-11	Glenville	Blarney
	D Drake 0-3, N Coakley 0-2, C McIntyre 0-1.		P Cahill 0-6, K Coakley 0-2, E O'Reilly 0-1, D Buttimer 0-1, J Halbert 0-1.

=== Relegation playoff ===
17 September 2011 Playoff	Carrigaline	0-14 - 1-11	Grenagh	Blarney
	D Drake 0-6, N Coakley 0-5, K McIntyre 0-1, E O'Keeffe 0-1, G Harrington 0-1.		D Dorgan 0-5, P McCarthy 1-0, T Walsh 0-2, J Russell 0-2, G Russell 0-1, N O'Doherty 0-1.

8 October 2011 Playoff replay	Carrigaline	1-13 - 0-16 (aet)	Grenagh	Blarney
	D Drake 1-3, N Coakley 0-5, P Murphy 0-2, K Kavanagh 0-2, B O'Keeffe 0-1.		D Dorgan 0-5, U Duggan 0-3, S Coleman 0-2, P Sexton 0-2, T Walsh 0-1, T Kenny 0-1, J Russell 0-1, C Fitzgerald 0-1.

5 November 2011 Playoff 2nd replay	Carrigaline	1-14 - 1-09	Grenagh	Páirc Uí Rinn
	N Coakley 1-5, S O'Brien 0-5, D Drake 0-2, P Ronayne 0-1, P Murphy 0-1.		T Walsh 1-2, D Dorgan 0-3, T Kenny 0-2, J Russell 0-1, P Sexton 0-1.

=== Round 4 ===
6 August 2011 Round 4	Glenville	0-11 - 1-09	Nemo Rangers	Riverstown Sportsfield
	P Cahill 0-6, K Coakley 0-3, N O'Riordan 0-2.		J Philpott 1-1, S Horgan 0-2, D Nation 0-2, L O'Sullivan 0-1, K Weldon 0-1, P Brophy 0-1, C Allen 0-1.

7 August 2011 Round 4	Newmarket	0-13 - 0-06	Ballinora	Castle Grounds
	N Flanagan 0-7, TJ Bodie 0-2, K O'Sullivan 0-2, M Reidy 0-1, J Lane 0-1.		C O'Shea 0-3, B Ahern 0-2, J Werner 0-1.

7 August 2011 Round 4	Naomh Abán	0-09 - 0-09	Kiskeam	Castle Grounds
	S Mac Cárthaigh 0-3, D Ó Súilleabháin 0-2, M Ó Cróinín 0-2, A Hankus 0-1, A Ó Loingsigh 0-1.		M Herlihy 0-3, B Dennehy 0-2, N Cronin 0-2, D O'Leary 0-1, E O'Mahony 0-1.

13 August 2011 Round 4	Clyda Rovers	1-10 - 1-10	Mallow	Mill Field
	K McCarthy 1-0, (og), P Kissane 0-3, J Murphy 0-3, C O'Sullivan 0-2, C Flanagan 0-1, C O'Sullivan 0-1.		C O'Riordan 0-6, D Hayes 1-2, E Murphy 0-1, K Sheehan 0-1.

13 August 2011 Round 4	Macroom	0-14 - 1-09	Bantry Blues	Ballingeary
	J Goold 0-3, F Goold 0-3, A Hegarty 0-2, D Goold 0-2, O Murphy 0-1, S Kiely 0-1, B Lynch 0-1, P Corrigan 0-1.		D Barron 0-5, J Canty 1-0, M O'Sullivan 0-2, J Harrington 0-1, M Delaney 0-1.

14 August 2011 Round 4 replay	Naomh Abán	0-15 - 1-07	Kiskeam	Castle Grounds
	S Mac Cárthaigh 0-8, D Ó Súilleabháin 0-2, M Ó Cróinín 0-2, A Hankus 0-2, M Ó Laoire 0-1.		N Cronin 1-1, M Herlihy 0-3, D O'Leary 0-1, B Dennehy 0-1, D Scannell 0-1.

14 August 2011 Round 4	St. Michael's	0-10 - 1-16	Béal Átha'n Ghaorthaidh	Kilmurry
	E Buckley 0-3, A O'Connell 0-2, E Hegarty 0-2, J Linehan 0-1, W Kennedy 0-1, M Mulconry 0-1.		L Seartan 0-6, C Ó Duinnín 1-0, T Ó Laoire 0-2, B Seartan 0-2, A Ó Coinceannáin 0-2, S Ó Duinnín 0-1, C Ó Tuama 0-1, P Ó Buachalla 0-1, I Ó Coinceannáin 0-1.

10 September 2011 Round 4 replay	Clyda Rovers	2-12 - 2-05	Mallow	Mill Field
	D O'Brien 2-0, J Murphy 0-5, M O'Brien 0-1, K Fitzgerald 0-1, C Flanagan 0-1, P O'Mullane 0-1, G Carey 0-1, C O'Sullivan 0-1, C Lane 0-1.		C O'Riordan 1-3, D Relihan 1-0, H Dockery 0-1, E Murphy 0-1.

=== Quarter-finals ===
13 August 2011 Quarter-final	Mayfield	0-09 - 1-10	St. Vincent's	Páirc Uí Rinn
	P Condon 0-5, B Hegarty 0-2, N Kelly 0-1, E Crowley 0-1.		JP Murphy 0-7, A Harte 1-0, D O'Regan 0-1, D Duggan 0-1, P O'Shea 0-1.

28 August 2011 Quarter-final	Newmarket	2-07 - 0-13	Naomh Abán	Dromtarriffe
	TJ Bodie 1-4, K O'Sullivan 1-1, TJ Brosnan 0-1, M Reidy 0-1.		M Ó Cróinín 0-4, S Ó Laoire 0-3, D Ó Súilleabháin 0-2, D Ó Cróinín 0-2, D Ó Ceocháin 0-1, A Hankus 0-1.

28 August 2011 Quarter-final	Béal Átha'n Ghaorthaidh	1-12 - 1-08	Nemo Rangers	Kilmurry
	L Seartan 0-4, C Ó Duinnín 0-4, P Ó Buachalla 1-0, B Seartan 0-2, A Ó Coinceannáin 0-1, C Ó Tuama 0-1.		W Morgan 0-4, C Allen 1-0, L O'Sullivan 0-2, E Dilloughrey 0-1, A O'Donovan 0-1.

17 September 2011 Quarter-final	Clyda Rovers	0-08 - 0-05	Macroom	Páirc Eoin Mhic Charthaigh
	J Murphy 0-3, D O'Brien 0-2, P Kissane 0-1, C Flanagan 0-1, P O'Mullane 0-1.		D Goold 0-3, A Hegarty 0-1, P Corrigan 0-1.

=== Semi-finals ===
11 September 2011 Semi-final	Newmarket	0-08 - 0-06	St. Vincent's	Dr. Croke Park
	J Lane 0-2, TJ Bodie 0-2, D O'Flynn 0-1, T O'Keeffe 0-1, K O'Sullivan 0-1, N Flanagan 0-1.		JP Murphy 0-3, G Kelleher 0-1, D O'Connor 0-1, T O'Connell 0-1.

1 October 2011 Semi-final	Clyda Rovers	1-09 - 0-09	Béal Átha'n Ghaorthaidh	Páirc Eoin Mhic Charthaigh
	D O'Brien 1-1, F O'Shea 0-2, J Murphy 0-2, M O'Brien 0-1, P Kissane 0-1, C Flanagan 0-1, P O'Mullane 0-1.		B Seartan 0-2, L Seartan 0-2, A Ó Coinceannáin 0-2, C Ó Tuama 0-1, C Ó Duinnín 0-1, B Ó Coinceannáin 0-1.

=== Final ===
16 October 2011 Final	Clyda Rovers	1-10 - 3-06	Newmarket	Páirc Uí Chaoimh
	J Murphy 0-6, F O'Shea 1-1, Cian O'Sullivan 0-2, Conor O'Sullivan 0-1.		T O'Keeffe 1-1, B O'Riordan 1-0(pen), K O'Sullivan 1-0, N Flanagan 0-2, TJ Bodie 0-1, J Lane 0-1, B Daly 0-1.

== Championship statistics ==
=== Top scorers ===
Overall

Rank	Player	Club	Tally	Total	Matches	Average
1	Nicky Flanagan	Newmarket	1-24	27	6	4.50
2	David Drake	Carrigaline	1-21	24	6	4.00
3	Niall Coakley	Carrigaline	1-19	22	6	3.66
3	Diarmuid Dorgan	Grenagh	0-22	22	6	3.66
4	Paudie Cahill	Glenville	0-21	21	4	5.25
5	James Murphy	Clyda Rovers	0-19	19	6	3.16
6	Cian O'Riordan	Mallow	1-15	18	3	6.00
6	Shane Mac Cárthaigh	Naomh Abán	1-15	18	4	4.50
6	T. J. Bodie	Newmarket	1-15	18	7	2.57
6	Mícheál Ó Cróinín	Naomh Abán	0-18	18	5	3.60

In a single game

Rank	Player	Club	Tally	Total	Opposition
1	Paul Condon	Mayfield	1-05	8	St. Michael's
1	Nicky Flanagan	Newmarket	1-05	8	Grenagh
1	Niall Coakley	Carrigaline	1-05	8	Grenagh
1	Shane Mac Cárthaigh	Naomh Abán	0-08	8	Kiskeam
2	T. J. Bodie	Newmarket	1-04	7	Naomh Abán
2	J. P. Murphy	St. Vincent's	0-07	7	Mayfield
2	Mícheál Ó Cróinín	Naomh Abán	0-07	7	Carrigaline
2	Nicky Flanagan	Newmarket	0-07	7	Ballinora
3	Derek O'Brien	Clyda Rovers	2-00	6	Mallow
3	David Kearney	Nemo Rangers	1-03	6	St. Vincent's
3	Eoghan Buckley	St. Michael's	1-03	6	Mayfield
3	Shane Mac Cárthaigh	Naomh Abán	1-03	6	Carrigaline
3	David Scannell	Kiskeam	1-03	6	Newmarket
3	David Drake	Carrigaline	1-03	6	Grenagh
3	Cian O'Riordan	Mallow	1-03	6	Clyda Rovers
3	David Goold	Macroom	0-06	6	Grenagh
3	Cian O'Riordan	Mallow	0-06	6	Glenville
3	J. P. Murphy	St. Vincent's	0-06	6	Grenagh
3	Paudie Cahill	Glenville	0-06	6	Carrigaline
3	David Drake	Carrigaline	0-06	6	Grenagh
3	Paudie Cahill	Glenville	0-06	6	Nemo Rangers
3	Cian O'Riordan	Mallow	0-06	6	Clyda Rovers
3	Liam Seartan	Béal Átha'n Ghaorthaidh	0-06	6	St. Michael's
3	James Murphy	Clyda Rovers	0-06	6	Newmarket
