= 2009 Cork Premier Intermediate Football Championship =

Irish football sporting event

- Dates: 1 April 2009 – 18 October 2009
- Teams: 14
- Sponsor: Evening Echo
- Champions: Valley Rovers (1st title); Éamonn Collins (captain); Mick Halligan (manager)
- Runners-up: Clyda Rovers; Padhraic O'Mullane (captain); Mossie Barrett (manager)
- Relegated: Killavullen

Tournament statistics
- Matches played: 29
- Goals scored: 43 (1.48 per match)
- Points scored: 528 (18.21 per match)
- Top scorer(s): James Murphy (2-25)

The 2009 Cork Premier Intermediate Football Championship was the fourth staging of the Cork Premier Intermediate Football Championship since its establishment by the Cork County Board in 2006. The draw for the opening round fixtures took place on 13 December 2008. The championship began on 1 April 2009 and ended on 18 October 2009.

St. Finbarr's and Youghal left the championship after their respective promotion and relegation to different grades. Bantry Blues and Valley Rovers joined the championship. Killavullen were relegated from the championship after being beaten in a playoff by Mayfield.

The final was played on 18 October 2009 at Páirc Uí Chaoimh in Cork, between Valley Rovers and Clyda Rovers. Valley Rovers won the final by 0–07 to 0–05 to claim their first championship title in the grade and a second successive promotion.

Glanmire's James Murphy was the championship's top scorer with 2-25.

== Team changes ==
=== To Championship ===
Promoted from the Cork Intermediate Football Championship

- Valley Rovers

Relegated from the Cork Senior Football Championship

- Bantry Blues

=== From Championship ===
Promoted to the Cork Senior Football Championship

- St. Finbarr's

Relegated to the Cork Intermediate Football Championship

- Youghal

== Results ==
=== Round 1 ===
1 April 2009 Round 1	Newcestown	0-13 - 0-07	Nemo Rangers	Cloughduv
	B Horgan 0-5, H Curran 0-4, C Keane 0-2, D Twomey 0-1, T Twomey 0-1.		W Morgan 0-2, M Kearney 0-2, G Kerins 0-1, P Hogan 0-1, S Marshall 0-1.

5 April 2009 Round 1	Clyda Rovers	0-06 - 1-09	Valley Rovers	Blarney
	P Kissane 0-1, N O'Mullane 0-1, D Murphy 0-1, D O'Brien 0-1, F O'Shea 0-1, J Murphy 0-1.		H O'Donovan 0-8, E Collins 1-1.

5 April 2009 Round 1	Kiskeam	3-12 - 1-14	Bantry Blues	Cill na Martra
	B Dennehy 2-2, N Cronin 0-5, M Casey 1-0, M Herlihy 0-3, D Fitzgerald 0-2.		D Barron 0-8, D Power 1-1, R Deane 0-2, S Drummey 0-1, J Canty 0-1, D McGrath 0-1.

5 April 2009 Round 1	Mayfield	0-08 - 0-08	Ballinora	Ballincollig
	T Lotty 0-4, M Barry 0-1, D Grainger 0-1, D Lucey 0-1, S O'Brien 0-1.		J Werner 0-3, M Murphy 0-2, E Lougheed 0-2, B Ahern 0-1.

11 April 2009 Round 1	Glenville	0-05 - 1-12	Grenagh	Mallow GAA Complex
	K Coakley 0-5, P Cahill 0-1.		S Coleman 0-5, DD Dorgan 0-4, K O'Neill 1-0, T Kenny 0-2, T Walsh 0-1.

12 April 2009 Round 1 replay	Mayfield	2-08 - 1-13 (aet)	Ballinora	Ballincollig
	D Grainger 0-5, T Lotty 1-1, P Condon 1-1, M Barry 0-1.		M Murphy 1-3, J Werner 0-4, B Ahern 0-3, C O'Shea 0-3.

13 April 2009 Round 1	Newmarket	0-05 - 0-08	St. Vincent's	Mallow GAA Complex
	J Ryan 0-3, D O'Flynn 0-1, D O'Brien 0-1.		JP Murphy 0-5, D O'Connor 0-1, C Barry 0-1, P Ahern 0-1.

15 April 2009 Round 1	Béal Átha'n Ghaorthaidh	1-08 - 0-08	Glanmire	Cloughduv
	L Seartan 0-6, A Ó Coinceannáin 1-1, B Ó Coinceannáin 0-1.		B Kiely 0-3, J Murphy 0-3, D Molden 0-2.

14 April 2009 Round 1	Killavullen	1-06 - 1-10	St. Michael's	Páirc Uí Rinn
	R Relihan 1-0, B Norris 0-3, D Hartnett 0-1, M Browne 0-1, J O'Neill 0-1.		E Hegarty 1-5, M Drummond 0-2, E Buckley 0-2, W Kennedy 0-1.

=== Round 2 ===
30 May 2009 Round 2	Glanmire	1-09 - 0-12	Glenville	Erin's Own Grounds
	J Murphy 0-4, C Cummins 1-0, D O'Connell 0-1, P Goggin 0-1, M Cussen 0-1, M Hopkins 0-1, G O'Loughlin 0-1.		K Coakley 0-5, S O'Leary 0-2, P O'Brien 0-2, J O'Keeffe 0-1, N Cahill 0-1, P Cahill 0-1.

30 May 2009 Round 2	Newmarket	0-11 - 1-12	Nemo Rangers	Coachford
	J Ryan 0-5, TJ Bodie 0-2, D O'Brien 0-2, K O'Sullivan 0-1, G Casey 0-1.		B O'Driscoll 1-4, D Kearney 0-5, J Kerins 0-2, M Kearney 0-1.

20 June 2009 Round 2	Mayfield	1-06 - 2-14	Clyda Rovers	Páirc Eoin Mhic Charthaigh
	P Condon 1-0, D Grainger 0-3, T Lotty 0-2, P Scannell 0-1.		J Murphy 1-6, O O'Hanlon 1-0, D Roche 0-2, M O'Brien 0-1, F O'Shea 0-1, C Flanagan 0-1, P Kissane 0-1, P O'Mullane 0-1, T O'Mullane 0-1.

11 July 2009 Round 2	Bantry Blues	2-09 - 0-03	Killavullen	Coachford
	D Barron 1-4, J Canty 1-3, G Canty 0-1, D O'Shea 0-1.		B Norris 0-3.

19 July 2009 Round 2 replay	Glanmire	1-08 - 1-05	Glenville	Erin's Own Grounds
	J Murphy 1-5, B Kirby 0-1, M Cussen 0-1, D Molden 0-1.		J Dorgan 1-0, P Cahill 0-2, K Corkery 0-1, A Cronin 0-1, N O'Riordan 0-1.

=== Relegation play-offs ===
27 June 2009 Semi-final	Newmarket	1-09 - 0-09	Mayfield	Dr. Croke Park
	T O'Keeffe 1-1, J Ryan 0-2, TJ Brodie 0-2, B Daly 0-2, J Lane 0-1, M Feehan 0-1.		D Grainger 0-3, P Condon 0-3, T Lotty 0-2, I Fleming 0-1.

10 August 2009 Semi-final	Glenville	3-12 - 2-11	Killavullen	Bride Rovers Park
	K O'Keeffe 2-1, P Cahill 0-5, J O'Keeffe 1-0, K Coakley 0-3, N O'Riordan 0-2, A Cronin 0-1.		D Relihan 2-0, L Dorgan 0-4, A O'Driscoll 0-3, I O'Gorman 0-2, J O'Regan 0-2.

14 August 2009 Final	Killavullen	0-06 - 1-16	Mayfield	Bride Rovers Park
	D Dorgan 0-5, A O'Driscoll 0-1.		D Grainger 0-6, N Kelly 1-2, T Lotty 0-4, R Scannell 0-1, P Condon 0-1, E Crowley 0-1, D Lucey 0-1.

=== Round 3 ===
13 June 2009 Round 3	Kiskeam	1-11 - 1-15	Grenagh	Mallow GAA Complex
	B Dennehy 1-1, N Cronin 0-4, M Herlihy 0-3, D Fitzgerald 0-2, P O'Leary 0-1.		L Walsh 1-4, DD Dorgan 0-5, S Coleman 0-2, Donie Dorgan 0-2, T Walsh 0-1, N Doherty 0-1.

19 June 2009 Round 3	St. Michael's	0-09 - 1-08	St. Vincent's	Páirc Uí Rinn
	M Mulconry 0-3, M Russell 0-2, E Hegarty 0-2, E Buckley 0-1, B O'Keeffe 0-1.		JP Murphy 0-4, T Hornibrook 1-0, A Buckley 0-3, D O'Connell 0-1.

12 July 2009 Round 3	Clyda Rovers	1-12 - 0-05	Nemo Rangers	Blarney
	P Kissane 0-4, O O'Hanlon 1-0, C O'Sullivan 0-3, J Murphy 0-3, N O'Mullane 0-1, C Lane 0-1.		D Kearney 0-3, M Kearney 0-1, A Cronin 0-1.

17 July 2009 Round 3	Béal Átha'n Ghaorthaidh	1-07 - 1-15	Bantry Blues	Sam Maguire Park
	A Ó Coinceannáin 1-5, C Ó Duinnín 0-2.		D Barron 1-5, N Canty 0-2, S Coughlan 0-2, G Canty 0-2, D Power 0-1, S Drummey 0-1, S O'Neill 0-1, J Downey 0-1.

=== Quartier-finals ===
7 July 2009 Quarter-final	St. Vincent's	0-09 - 0-09	Grenagh	Blarney
	JP Murphy 0-4, A Buckley 0-2, J Buckley 0-2, T Hornibrook 0-1.		DD Dorgan 0-3, L Walsh 0-3, Donie Dorgan 0-1, J Russell 0-1, N Doherty 0-1.

12 July 2009 Quarter-final	Newcestown	0-11 - 2-09	Valley Rovers	Charlie Hurley Park
	B Horgan 0-6, H Curran 0-3, D Twomey 0-1, D Heffernan 0-1.		F Lynch 1-2, E Collins 1-2, E Manning 0-4, B Lehane 0-1.

16 August 2009 Quarter-final replay	St. Vincent's	0-10 - 0-07	Grenagh	Blarney
	J Buckley 0-5, JP Murphy 0-4, P O'Sullivan 0-1.		G Russell 0-3, DD Dorgan 0-1, C Fitzgerald 0-1, A Kenny 0-1, R Dorgan 0-1.

29 August 2009 Quarter-final	Ballinora	1-05 - 0-14	Glanmire	Páirc Uí Chaoimh
	J Werner 1-2, M Murphy 0-1, C Brosnan 0-1, B Ahern 0-1.		J Murphy 0-8, M Cussen 0-3, J Cussen 0-1, B Kirby 0-1, D Kearney 0-1.

4 October 2009 Quarter-final	Bantry Blues	0-06 - 0-08	Clyda Rovers	Carrigadrohid
	D Barron 0-3, J Canty 0-2, N Canty 0-1.		J Murphy 0-5, P Kissane 0-2, M O'Brien 0-1.

=== Semi-finals ===
3 October 2009 Semi-final	Glanmire	1-07 - 1-09	Valley Rovers	Páirc Uí Rinn
	J Murphy 1-5, B Kirby 0-1, C Cummins 0-1.		H O'Donovan 0-4, S Nolan 1-0, E Manning 0-3, J Hurley 0-1, F Lynch 0-1.

11 October 2009 Semi-final	St. Vincent's	2-08 - 2-10	Clyda Rovers	Mallow GAA Complex
	C Barry 0-5, T Hornibrook 1-1, D O'Connor 1-0, J Buckley 0-1, K Goulding 0-1.		P Kissane 0-6, J Murphy 1-2, K Roche 1-1, J O'Hanlon 0-1.

=== Finals ===
18 October 2009 Final	Valley Rovers	0-07 - 0-05	Clyda Rovers	Páirc Uí Chaoimh
	H O'Donovan 0-3, K Canty 0-2, F Lynch 0-1, S Manning 0-1.		P Kissane 0-3, T O'Mullane 0-1, D Murphy 0-1.

== Championship statistics ==
=== Top scorers ===
Overall

Rank	Player	Club	Tally	Total	Matches	Average
1	James Murphy	Glanmire	2-25	31	5	6.20
2	Declan Barron	Bantry Blues	2-20	26	4	6.50
3	James Murphy	Clyda Rovers	2-17	23	6	3.83
4	Dean Grainger	Mayfield	0-18	18	5	3.60
5	Paudie Kissane	Clyda Rovers	0-17	17	6	2.83
5	J. P. Murphy	St. Vincent's	0-17	17	4	4.25
6	Terry Lotty	Mayfield	1-13	16	5	3.20
7	Hughie O'Donovan	Valley Rovers	0-15	15	4	3.75
8	Kevin Coakley	Glenville	0-13	13	3	4.33
9	Aindrias Ó Coinceannáin	Béal Átha'n Ghaorthaidh	2-06	12	2	6.00
9	Jurgen Werner	Ballinora	1-09	12	3	4.00

In a single game

Rank	Player	Club	Tally	Total	Opposition
1	James Murphy	Clyda Rovers	1-06	9	Mayfield
2	Billy Dennehy	Kiskeam	2-02	8	Bantry Blues
2	Eric Hegarty	St. Michael's	1-05	8	Killavullen
2	James Murphy	Glanmire	1-05	8	Glenville
2	Aindrias Ó Coinceannáin	Béal Átha'n Ghaorthaidh	1-05	8	Bantry Blues
2	Declan Barron	Bantry Blues	1-05	8	Béal Átha'n Ghaorthaidh
2	James Murphy	Glanmire	1-05	8	Valley Rovers
2	James Murphy	Glanmire	0-08	8	Ballinora
2	Hughie O'Donovan	Valley Rovers	0-08	8	Clyda Rovers
2	Declan Barron	Bantry Blues	0-08	8	Kiskeam
