= 2010 Cork Premier Intermediate Football Championship =

- Dates: 8 May 2010 – 30 October 2010
- Teams: 16
- Sponsor: Evening Echo
- Champions: Newcestown (1st title); Niall O'Sullivan (captain); Jim O'Sullivan (manager)
- Runners-up: Clyda Rovers; Oliver O'Hanlon (captain); Mossie Barrett (manager)
- Relegated: Glanmire

Tournament statistics
- Matches played: 35
- Goals scored: 51 (1.46 per match)
- Points scored: 657 (18.77 per match)
- Top scorer(s): David Drake (0-39)

The 2010 Cork Premier Intermediate Football Championship was the fifth staging of the Cork Premier Intermediate Football Championship since its establishment by the Cork County Board in 2006. The draw for the opening round fixtures took place on 13 December 2009. The championship began on 8 May 2010 and ended on 30 October 2010.

Valley Rovers and Killavullen left the championship after their respective promotion and relegation to different grades. Carrigaline and Mallow joined the championship. Glanmire were relegated from the championship after being beaten in a playoff by Newmarket.

The final was played on 30 October 2010 at Páirc Uí Rinn in Cork, between Newcestown and Clyda Rovers. Newcestown won the final by 0-10 to 0-09 to claim their first championship title in the grade. It was Clyda Rovers' second successive final defeat.

Carrigaline's David Drake was the championship's top scorer with 0-39.

== Team changes ==
=== To Championship ===
Promoted from the Cork Intermediate Football Championship

- Carrigaline

Relegated from the Cork Senior Football Championship

- Mallow

=== From Championship ===
Promoted to the Cork Senior Football Championship

- Valley Rovers

Relegated to the Cork Intermediate Football Championship

- Killavullen

== Results ==
=== Round 1 ===
8 May 2010 Round 1	Bantry Blues	1-09 - 2-09	Ballinora	St. Mary's Park
	D Barron 0-5, S Coughlan 1-0, S Drummey 0-3, G Canty 0-1.		C Brosnan 2-3, M Murphy 0-4, B Ahern 0-2.

14 May 2010 Round 1	Mayfield	0-08 - 0-07	Glenville	Erin's Own Grounds
	B Hegarty 0-5, R Scannell 0-2, T Tynan 0-1.		K Coakley 0-3, P O'Brien 0-2, S O'Leary 0-2.

15 May 2010 Round 1	Glanmire	0-06 - 0-09	Béal Átha'n Ghaorthaidh	Coachford
	J Cussen 0-3, J Murphy 0-1, B Kirby 0-1, B Linehan 0-1.		A Ó Coinceannáin 0-5, L Seartan 0-2, I Ó Coinceannáin 0-1, D Mac Cárthaigh 0-1.

16 May 2010 Round 1	Kiskeam	1-09 - 0-11	Newmarket	Kanturk
	N Cronin 0-5, D Scannell 1-0, D O'Leary 0-3, B Dennehy 0-1.		SF O'Connor 0-3, D Flynn 0-2, TJ Bodie 0-2, T O'Keeffe 0-1, M Reidy 0-1, B Daly 0-1, J Ryan 0-1.

16 May 2010 Round 1	Mallow	0-09 - 1-10	St. Vincent's	Blarney
	C O'Riordan 0-5, B O'Halloran 0-2, H Dockery 0-1, BJ Ryan 0-1.		JP Murphy 0-8, T Hornibrook 1-0, J Buckley 0-1, C Barry 0-1.

16 May 2010 Round 1	Carrigaline	0-06 - 0-11	Nemo Rangers	Páirc Liam Mhic Cárthaigh
	N Coakley 0-3, D Drake 0-2, B O'Keefe 0-1.		G Kerins 0-3, A Morgan 0-2, S Marshall 0-2, B Twomey 0-2, S Twomey 0-1, D Breen 0-1.

16 May 2010 Round 1	Clyda Rovers	0-08 - 1-07	Newcestown	Ovens
	P Kissane 0-4, J Murphy 0-2, P O'Mullane 0-2.		T Twomey 1-4, B Horgan 0-3.

16 May 2010 Round 1	St. Michael's	1-10 - 0-10	Grenagh	Blarney
	E Hegarty 1-6, M Mulconry 0-2, D Gosnell 0-1, S O'SUllivan 0-1.		D Dorgan 0-6, T Kenny 0-2, T Walsh 0-1, K Cummins 0-1.

=== Round 2 ===
12 June 2010 Round 2	Glanmire	0-07 - 0-09	Grenagh	Blarney
	J Murphy 0-6, K Mulvihill 0-1.		G Russell 0-4, D Dorgan 0-4, J Russell 0-1.

12 June 2010 Round 2	Mallow	1-09 - 0-09	Carrigaline	Blarney
	C O'Riordan 0-6, BJ Ryan 1-1, K Sheehan 0-2.		D Drake 0-4, E Murphy 0-1, R Keohane 0-1, B O'Keeffe 0-1, S O'Brien 0-1, E O'Sullivan 0-1.

18 June 2010 Round 2	Bantry Blues	3-07 - 0-07	Glenville	Kilmurry
	S Coughlan 2-0, S Drummey 0-5, R Deane 0-1, K Harrington 0-1.		K Coakley 0-2, P O'Brien 0-2, S O'Leary 0-1, P Cahill 0-1, J Halbert 0-1.

19 June 2010 Round 2	Clyda Rovers	0-14 - 1-08	Newmarket	Banteer Sportsfield
	C Flanagan 0-8, C O'Sullivan 0-2, J Murphy 0-2, P Kissane 0-1, F O'Shea 0-1.		J Ryan 0-4, M Reidy 1-0, B Daly 0-2, D Flynn 0-1, J Lane 0-1.

=== Round 3 ===
2 July 2010 Round 3	Glenville	1-11 - 1-08	Newmarket	Mourne Abbey
	P Cahill 1-5, P O'Brien 0-2, D Buttimer 0-1, S O'Leary 0-1, J Halbert 0-1, K Coakley 0-1.		M Reidy 1-1, J Ryan 0-3, B Daly 0-1, TJ Bodie 0-1, T O'Keeffe 0-1, J Lane 0-1.

3 July 2010 Round 3	Carrigaline	1-15 - 2-10 (aet)	Glanmire	Páirc Uí Rinn
	D Drake 0-12, T O'Sullivan 1-0, E Murphy 0-1, S O'Brien 0-1, R Keohane 0-1.		J Murphy 1-4, B O'Sullivan 1-0, C Cummins 0-1, J Cussen 0-1, K Mulvihill 0-1, D O'Connell 0-1, M Hopkins 0-1, D Molden 0-1.

=== Relegation playoff ===
12 September 2010 Playoff	Glanmire	0-12 - 4-07	Newmarket	Mourne Abbey
	J Murphy 0-5, J Cussen 0-2, M Cussen 0-2, M Hopkins 0-2, T Leahy 0-1.		M Reidy 1-1, J Lane 1-1, B O'Leary 1-0, T O'Keeffe 1-0, N Flanagan 0-2, TJ Bodie 0-2, B Daly 0-1.

=== Round 4 ===
4 August 2010 Round 4	Bantry Blues	1-07 - 1-07	Nemo Rangers	Carrigadrohid
	D Barron 1-1, R Deane 0-2, S Drummey 0-1, D McGrath 0-1, S O'Neill 0-1, M Delaney 0-1.		G Kerins 1-2, B Twomey 0-2, S Marshall 0-1, S Horgan 0-1, S McKeown 0-1.

4 August 2010 Round 4	Mallow	0-13 - 0-08	Mayfield	Páirc Eoin Mhic Charthaigh
	C O'Riordan 0-8, H Dockery 0-3, E Stanton 0-1, D Hayes 0-1.		B Hegarty 0-4, T Lotty 0-2, D Lucey 0-1, N Kelly 0-1.

6 August 2010 Round 4	Ballinora	0-10 - 1-13	Newcestown	Ovens
	C O'Shea 0-6, B Ahern 0-1, M Murphy 0-1, C Brosnan 0-1, A O'Neill 0-1.		T Twomey 1-1, B Horgan 0-3, H Curran 0-3, D Twomey 0-2, F Keane 0-1, B Moloney 0-1, G O'Driscoll 0-1, M Kelly 0-1.

7 August 2010 Round 4	Clyda Rovers	2-07 - 0-07	St. Michael's	Blarney
	J Murphy 2-1, C Flanagan 0-4, P Kissane 0-1, P O'Mullane 0-1.		E Hegarty 0-3, M Mulconry 0-2, G Howard 0-1, S O'Sullivan 0-1.

7 August 2010 Round 4	Carrigaline	0-12 - 1-09	Glenville	Páirc Uí Rinn
	D Drake 0-8, P Murphy 0-2, T O'Sullivan 0-2.		P Cahill 0-5, A Cronin 1-0, K Coakley 0-2, N O'Riordan 0-1, D Buttimer 0-1.

14 August 2010 Round 4	Grenagh	1-09 - 0-12	Béal Átha'n Ghaorthaidh	Kilmichael
	J Russell 1-1, G Russell 0-3, D Dorgan 0-2, T Kenny 0-1, T Walsh 0-1, C Fitzgerald 0-1.		A Ó Coinceannáin 0-6, L Seartan 0-4, D Mac Cárthaigh 0-1, C Ó Duinnín 0-1.

21 August 2010 Round 4 replay	Grenagh	0-12 - 1-07	Béal Átha'n Ghaorthaidh	Kilmichael
	G Russell 0-5, J O'Neill 0-2, N O'Doherty 0-1, T Walsh 0-1, C Fitzgerald 0-1, J Russell 0-1, K O'Neill 0-1.		N Ó Tuama 1-0, A Ó Coinceannáin 0-2, L Seartan 0-2, M Ó Muineacháin 0-1, B Ó Coinceannáin 0-1, L Ó Conchúir 0-1.

29 August 2010 Round 4 replay	Carrigaline	3-08 - 1-10	Glenville	Páirc Uí Rinn
	B O'Keeffe 2-0, D Drake 0-4, P Murphy 1-0, W O'Brien 0-2, E O'Sullivan 0-1, E Murphy 0-1.		P Cahill 0-8, K Coakley 1-0, S O'Leary 0-1, J O'Keeffe 0-1.

26 September 2010 Round 4 replay	Bantry Blues	1-07 - 1-04	Nemo Rangers	Carrigadrohid
	D Power 1-1, D Barron 0-3, S Coughlan 0-2, M O'Sullivan 0-1.		D Nation 1-0, S O'Brien 0-1, S Marshall 0-1, J Kavanagh 0-1, B Twomey 0-1.

=== Quarter-finals ===
31 August 2010 Quarter-final	Kiskeam	0-08 - 0-11	St. Vincent's	Kilmurry
	R Carroll 0-2, AJ O'Connor 0-1, S Linehan 0-1, M O'Herlihy 0-1, D Fitzgerald 0-1, B Dennehy 0-1, D O'Leary 0-1		JP Murphy 0-5, G Kelleher 0-2, D Duggan 0-1, J Buckley 0-1, P O'Sullivan 0-1, P O'Shea 0-1.

26 September 2010 Quarter-final	Carrigaline	1-12 - 1-12	Newcestown	Ballinhassig
	B O'Keeffe 1-1, D Drake 0-4, P Murphy 0-3, W O'Brien 0-2, E O'Keeffe 0-2.		B Horgan 1-4, T Twomey 0-5, M Kelly 0-1, G O'Driscoll 0-1, C Keane 0-1.

2 October 2010 Quarter-final replay	Carrigaline	0-09 - 1-07	Newcestown	Ballinhassig
	D Drake 0-5, W O'Brien 0-2, E O'Keeffe 0-1, E O'Sullivan 0-1.		D Twomey 1-0, B Horgan 0-3, H Curran 0-2, E Kelly 0-1, T Twomey 0-1.

3 October 2010 Quarter-final	Clyda Rovers	0-09 - 0-09	Grenagh	Páirc Eoin Mhic Charthaigh
	J Murphy 0-6, C Flanagan 0-3.		D Dorgan 0-4, G Russell 0-2, T Kenny 0-1.

3 October 2010 Quarter-final	Bantry Blues	0-15 - 1-12	Mallow	Castle Grounds
	D Barron 0-10, M O'Sullivan 0-2, D McGrath 0-1, D Power 0-1, G Canty 0-1.		C O'Riordan 1-4, H Dockery 0-6, D Hayes 0-1, J Hayes 0-1.

9 October 2010 Quarter-final replay	Clyda Rovers	0-13 - 1-08	Grenagh	Páirc Eoin Mhic Charthaigh
	J Murphy 0-7, C Flanagan 0-3, C O'Sullivan 0-3.		J O'Neill 1-0, T Kenny 0-3, T Walsh 0-2, J Russell 0-1, N O'Doherty 0-1, G Russell 0-1.

9 October 2010 Quarter-final replay	Bantry Blues	2-12 - 3-11 (aet)	Mallow	Castle Grounds
	S Coughlan 1-2, D Barron 1-2, G Canty 0-3, S Drummey 0-2, P Clifford 0-2, R Deane 0-1.		K Sheehan 2-1, D Hayes 1-1, C O'Riordan 0-4, H Dockery 0-4, P O'Riordan 0-1.

=== Semi-finals ===
16 October 2010 Semi-final	Mallow	1-10 - 4-09	Newcestown	Coachford
	C O'Riordan 0-4, D Hayes 1-0, J Hayes 0-2, H Dockery 0-1, K Sheehan 0-1, D Kerrisk 0-1, P O'Riordan 0-1.		B Horgan 1-3, T Twomey 1-1, H Curran 1-1, F Keane 1-1, D Twomey 0-1, M Kelly 0-1, S Ryan 0-1.

16 October 2010 Semi-final	Clyda Rovers	0-07 - 0-07	St. Vincent's	Páirc Uí Rinn
	J Murphy 0-2, C Flanagan 0-2, Conor O'Sullivan 0-2, Cian O'Sullivan 0-1.		JP Murphy 0-4, J Buckley 0-1, P Ahern 0-1, T Hornibrook 0-1.

23 October 2010 Semi-final replay	Clyda Rovers	0-13 - 1-08	St. Vincent's	Páirc Uí Rinn
	J Murphy 0-8, C O'Sullivan 0-3, C Flanagan 0-1, K Roche 0-1.		P O'Sullivan 1-4, JP Murphy 0-2, T O'Connell 0-1, J Buckley 0-1.

=== Final ===
30 October 2010 Final	Newcestown	0-10 - 0-09	Clyda Rovers	Páirc Uí Rinn
	D Twomey 0-2, T Twomey 0-2, H Curran 0-2, M Kelly 0-1, B Horgan 0-1, C Keane 0-1.		J Murphy 0-3, Conor O'Sullivan 0-2, C Flanagan 0-1, D Murphy 0-1, P O'Mullane 0-1, Cian O'Sullivan 0-1.

== Championship statistics ==
=== Top scorers ===
Overall

Rank	Player	Club	Tally	Total	Matches	Average
1	David Drake	Carrigaline	0-39	39	7	5.57
2	James Murphy	Clyda Rovers	2-31	37	8	4.62
3	Cian O'Riordan	Mallow	1-31	34	6	5.66
4	Declan Barron	Bantry Blues	2-21	27	5	5.40
5	Tadhg Twomey	Newcestown	3-14	23	6	3.83
5	Barry Horgan	Newcestown	2-17	23	6	3.83
6	Paudie Cahill	Glenville	1-19	22	5	4.40
6	Conor Flanagan	Clyda Rovers	0-22	22	8	3.75
7	James Murphy	Glanmire	1-16	19	4	4.75
7	J. P. Murphy	St. Vicnent's	0-19	19	4	4.75

In a single game

Rank	Player	Club	Tally	Total	Opposition
1	David Drake	Carrigaline	0-12	12	Glanmire
2	Declan Barron	Bantry Blues	0-10	10	Mallow
3	Conor Brosnan	Ballinora	2-03	9	Bantry Blues
3	Eric Hegarty	St. Michael's	1-06	9	Grenagh
4	Paudie Cahill	Glenville	1-05	8	Newmarket
4	J. P. Murphy	St. Vicnent's	0-08	8	Mallow
4	Conor Flanagan	Clyda Rovers	0-08	8	Newmarket
4	Cian O'Riordan	Mallow	0-08	8	Mayfield
4	David Drake	Carrigaline	0-08	8	Glenville
4	Paudie Cahill	Glenville	0-08	8	Carrigaline
4	James Murphy	Clyda Rovers	0-08	8	St. Vincent's
