= 2012 Cork Premier Intermediate Football Championship =

- Dates: 5 May 2012 – 28 October 2012
- Teams: 16
- Sponsor: Evening Echo
- Champions: St. Vincent's (2nd title); Jonathan Buckley (captain); Keith Ricken (manager)
- Runners-up: St Michael's; Richard Dineen (captain); Alan Dennehy (manager)
- Relegated: Mayfield

Tournament statistics
- Matches played: 30
- Goals scored: 62 (2.07 per match)
- Points scored: 608 (20.27 per match)
- Top scorer(s): Cian O'Riordan (1-28)

The 2012 Cork Premier Intermediate Football Championship was the seventh staging of the Cork Premier Intermediate Football Championship since its establishment by the Cork County Board in 2006. The draw for the opening round fixtures took place on 11 December 2011. The championship began on 5 May 2012 and ended on 28 October 2012.

Newmarket and Grenagh left the championship after their respective promotion and relegation to different grades. Kinsale and Valley Rovers joined the championship. Mayfield were relegated from the championship after being beaten in a playoff by Macroom.

The final was played on 28 October 2012 at Páirc Uí Chaoimh in Cork, between St. Vincent's and St Michael's. St. Vincent's won the match by 0-12 to 0-11 to claim their second championship title in the grade overall and a first title since 2006.

Mallow's Cian O'Riordan was the championship's top scorer with 1-28.

== Team changes ==
=== To Championship ===
Promoted from the Cork Intermediate Football Championship

- Kinsale

Relegated from the Cork Senior Football Championship

- Valley Rovers

=== From Championship ===
Promoted to the Cork Senior Football Championship

- Newmarket

Relegated to the Cork Intermediate Football Championship

- Grenagh

== Results ==
=== Round 1 ===
5 May 2012 Round 1	Mayfield	3-08 - 0-19 (aet)	Béal Átha'n Ghaorthaidh	Kilmurry
	R Scannell 1-1, S Kelly 1-0, J O'Sullivan 1-0, T Lotty 0-3, A Lynskey 0-1, C Bond 0-1, B Hegarty 0-1, S Fitzgerald 0-1.		L Seartan 0-13, L Ó Conchúir 0-3, B Seartan 0-1, N Ó Laoire 0-1, C Ó Tuama 0-1.

5 May 2012 Round 1	Ballinora	0-09 - 1-11	Naomh Abán	Kilmurry
	B Ahern 0-4, C Brosnan 0-2, P Fitton 0-1, A O'Neill 0-1, M Hodge 0-1.		M Ó Cróinín 0-8, D Ó Ceocháin 1-0, D Ó Súilleabháin 0-1, D Cronin 0-1, C Ó Murchú 0-1.

5 May 2012 Round 1	Bantry Blues	1-08 - 0-06	Clyda Rovers	Kilmichael
	S Coughlan 1-0, D Barron 0-3, M O'Sullivan 0-2, R Deane 0-2, G Canty 0-1.		C Flanagan 0-3, P Kissane 0-3.

5 May 2012 Round 1	Macroom	0-09 - 2-09	St. Vincent's	Ballyanley
	K Murphy 0-3, P Lucey 0-3, A Hegarty 0-1, F Goold 0-1, S Kiely 0-1.		T Hornibrook 2-0, J Buckley 0-4, A Harte 0-3, C Barry 0-1, JP Murphy 0-1.

5 May 2012 Round 1	Nemo Rangers	1-09 - 2-04	Kinsale	Belgooly
	D Kearney 1-2, J Kerins 0-3, K Weldon 0-2, P O'Shea 0-1, E Weldon 0-1.		B Coughlan 1-1, C O'Brien 1-1, D Ward 0-1, A Gould 0-1.

5 May 2012 Round 1	Valley Rovers	3-09 - 0-07	Glenville	Páirc Eoin Mhic Charthaigh
	F Lynch 2-3, J Cottrell 1-3, E Collins 0-2, E Delaney 0-1.		P Cahill 0-5, B Maloney 0-2.

6 May 2012 Round 1	Carrigaline	0-11 - 0-14	Mallow	Páirc Mac Gearailt
	S O'Brien 0-4, D Drake 0-3, N Coakley 0-2, K McIntyre 0-1, T Murphy 0-1.		C O'Riordan 0-9, P Herlihy 0-2, M O'Brien 0-1, C Stanton 0-1, E Stanton 0-1.

6 May 2012 Round 1	St. Michael's	0-12 - 1-08	Kiskeam	Mallow GAA Complex
	P Cronin 0-3, E Hegarty 0-2, E Buckley 0-2, C Kilcoyne 0-1, W Kennedy 0-1, S McCarthy 0-1, M Ryan 0-1, M Drummond 0-1.		N Cronin 0-4, R Carroll 1-0, M Herlihy 0-2, S Linehan 0-1, D Fitzgerald 0-1.

=== Round 2 ===
8 June 2012 Round 2	Kinsale	0-11 - 1-09	Kiskeam	Coachford
	B Coughlan 0-7, A Gould 0-1, C O'Brien 0-1, R O'Sullivan 0-1, D Coughlan 0-1.		B Dennehy 1-3, N Cronin 0-3, D Fitzgerald 0-1, M Casey 0-1, D O'Sullivan 0-1.

16 June 2012 Round 2	Macroom	0-12 - 0-15 (aet)	Glenville	Mallow GAA Complex
	A Hegarty 0-5, C O'Sullivan 0-2, D Kelly 0-2, O Murphy 0-1, K Murphy 0-1, F Goold 0-1.		B Maloney 0-7, W Connolly 0-2, P Cahill 0-2, J Halbert 0-2, P Cronin 0-1, J Foley 0-1.

16 June 2012 Round 2	Ballinora	1-09 - 2-09	Carrigaline	Páirc Liam Mhic Cárthaigh
	C Murphy 1-2, B Aherne 0-4, I Wycherley 0-2, C Brosnan 0-1.		K McIntyre 1-0, C O'Flynn 1-0, S O'Brien 0-3, N Coakley 0-2, P Murphy 0-2, N Murphy 0-1, B O'Keeffe 0-1.

16 June 2012 Round 2	Clyda Rovers	0-15 - 1-05	Mayfield	Ballyhooly
	J Murphy 0-6, D Roche 0-3, P Kissane 0-2, O O'Hanlon 0-1, F O'Shea 0-1, J O'Hanlon 0-1, C Ronayne 0-1.		E Fleming 0-4, N Kelly 1-0, S O'Donovan 0-1.

=== Round 3 ===
30 June 2012 Round 3	Mayfield	1-06 - 4-10	Ballinora	Ballincollig
	R Scannell 0-4, A Lynskey 1-0, B Hegarty 0-1, D Grainger 0-1.		C Murphy 3-2, M Murphy 1-2, I Wycherley 0-2, C Brosnan 0-2, B Ahern 0-1, P Fitton 0-1.

14 July 2012 Round 3	Kinsale	1-11 - 1-10	Macroom	Blarney
	G Finn 1-7, C O'Brien 0-3, D Murphy 0-1.		F Goold 0-4, I Casey 1-0, C O'Sullivan 0-2, A Hegarty 0-1, T Dineen 0-1, S Kiely 0-1, E O'Mahony 0-1.

=== Relegation playoff ===
1 September 2012 Playoff	Mayfield	1-04 - 2-15	Macroom	Ballyanley
	T Lotty 1-1, P Condon 0-2, S O'Sullivan 0-1.		O Murphy 1-3, I Casey 1-1, F Goold 0-4, A Hegarty 0-3, P Lucey 0-3, D Horgan 0-1.

=== Round 4 ===
21 July 2012 Round 4	Béal Átha'n Ghaorthaidh	1-10 - 0-13	Naomh Abán	Kilmichael
	A Ó Coinceannáin 1-1, L Seartan 0-3, B Seartan 0-2, L Ó Coinceannáin 0-2, T Ó Laoire 0-1, P Ó Buachalla 0-1.		M Ó Cróinín 0-4, C Murphy 0-2, T Scannell 0-2, D O'Sullivan 0-2, D Lyons 0-1, S McCarthy 0-1, D Keohane 0-1.

21 July 2012 Round 4	Ballinora	0-04 - 3-12	St. Michael's	Ballincollig
	B Ahern 0-4.		E Buckley 1-3, E Hegarty 1-3, M Ryan 1-0, A Murphy 0-2, W Kennedy 0-1, S McCarthy 0-1, M Drummond 0-1, M Mulconroy 0-1.

28 July 2012 Round 4	St. Vincent's	0-12 - 1-06	Glenville	Riverstown Sportsfield
	A Buckley 0-4, C Barry 0-2, JP Murphy 0-2, D Collins 0-1, K Lynch 0-1, D O'Regan 0-1, D O'Connor 0-1.		K Coakley 1-0, P Cahill 0-2, J Foley 0-1, S Bergin 0-1, W Connolly 0-1, B Healy 0-1.

10 August 2012 Round 4	Valley Rovers	1-08 - 1-10	Kiskeam	Ballyanley
	F Lynch 1-2, J Cottrell 0-4, E Manning 0-1, E Delaney 0-1.		B Dennehy 1-5, M Casey 0-1, N Cronin 0-1, P O'Leary 0-1, R Carroll 0-1, AJ O'Connor 0-1.

11 August 2012 Round 4 replay	Béal Átha'n Ghaorthaidh	1-09 - 2-07	Naomh Abán	Kilmichael
	A Ó Coinceannáin 1-5, C Ó Tuama 0-2, L Seartan 0-1, L Ó Conchúir 0-1.		M Ó Cróinín 1-1, S Mac Cárthaigh 0-4, C Ó Murchú 1-0, S Ó Laoire 0-1, D Ó Ceocháin 0-1.

1 September 2012 Round 4	Kinsale	1-08 - 1-08	Clyda Rovers	Blarney
	G Finn 0-5, B Coughlan 1-0, C Quigley 0-1, D Murphy 0-1, D Ward 0-1.		J Murphy 0-5, P Kissane 1-0, C Flanagan 0-2, G Carey 0-1.

1 September 2012 Round 4	Mallow	3-09 - 1-14	Bantry Blues	Castle Grounds
	C O'Riordan 1-4, P Herlihy 1-1, K O'Connor 1-1, H Dockery 0-2, D Relihan 0-1.		D Barron 0-7, M O'Sullivan 1-3, S Coughlan 0-1, K Harrington 0-1, D Power 0-1, G Canty 0-1.

8 September 2012 Round 4 replay	Kinsale	2-11 - 1-16	Clyda Rovers	Blarney
	B Coughlan 1-2, M Scully 1-0, G Finn 0-3, C O'Brien 0-2, D Murphy 0-1, D Ward 0-1, D Coughlan 0-1, B Gray 0-1.		J Murphy 0-9, O O'Hanlon 1-1, P Kissane 0-2, P O'Mullane 0-1, R Carey 0-1, C Flanagan 0-1, N O'Mullane 0-1.

=== Quarter-finals ===
12 August 2012 Quarter-final	Nemo Rangers	2-06 - 1-11	Carrigaline	Ted Hanley Memorial Park
	S O'Brien 2-0, J Kerins 0-3, A Morgan 0-2, C O'Donovan 0-1.		D Drake 1-3, N Coakley 0-5, T Murphy 0-2, P Murphy 0-1.

24 August 2012 Quarter-final	St. Vincent's	2-12 - 0-13	Naomh Abán	Kilmurry
	A Harte 2-0, A Buckley 0-4, J Buckley 0-4, D O'Connor 0-1, C Barry 0-1, K Lynch 0-1, JP Murphy 0-1.		S Mac Cárthaigh 0-3, M Ó Cróinín 0-3, Laoire 0-2, C Ó Murchú 0-2, T Ó Scanaill 0-1, D Ó Ceocháin 0-1, N Ó Ceallaigh 0-1.

14 September 2012 Quarter-final	Clyda Rovers	0-09 - 1-13	St. Michael's	Páirc Uí Rinn
	J Murphy 0-3, C Flanagan 0-2, P Kissane 0-2, F O'Shea 0-1, C O'Sullivan 0-1.		E Buckley 1-2, E Hegarty 0-5, M Ryan 0-2, P Cronin 0-2, M Mulconroy 0-1, D Cremin 0-1.

21 September 2012 Quarter-final	Kiskeam	2-12 - 2-15	Mallow	Kanturk
	B Dennehy 2-7, M Herlihy 0-3, G Casey 0-1, M Casey 0-1.		C O'Riordan 0-6, P Herlihy 1-2, C Stanton 1-1, A Sheehan 0-2, H Dockery 0-2, M Murphy 0-1, D Relihan 0-1.

=== Semi-finals ===
15 September 2012 Semi-final	Carrigaline	0-05 - 1-18	St. Vincent's	Belgooly
	D Drake 0-3, T Murphy 0-1, N Coakley 0-1.		A Buckley 0-6, A Harte 1-2, C Barry 0-3, J Buckley 0-3, D O'Connor 0-2, F Murphy 0-1, K Lynch 0-1.

29 September 2012 Semi-final	Mallow	0-12 - 3-08	St. Michael's	Bride Rovers Park
	C O'Riordan 0-9, D Relihan 0-2, P Herlihy 0-1.		E Buckley 1-4, E Hegarty 1-1, P Cronin 1-1, M Mulconry 0-1, M Ryan 0-1.

=== Final ===
28 October 2012 Final	St. Vincent's	0-12 - 0-11	St Michael's	Páirc Uí Chaoimh
	A Buckley 0-4 (1f, ’45); D O’Connor 0-3; J Buckley (1f) and JP Murphy 0-2 each; C Barry 0-1.		E Buckley 0-5 (3f); E Hegarty 0-4 (1f); D Cremin and M Ryan 0-1 each.	Referee: J Bermingham (Bride Rovers)

== Championship statistics ==
=== Top scorers ===
Overall

Rank	Player	Club	Tally	Total	Matches	Average
1	Cian O'Riordan	Mallow	1-28	31	4	7.75
2	Billy Dennehy	Kiskeam	4-15	27	4	6.75
3	Eoghan Buckley	St. Michael's	4-15	27	4	6.75
4	James Murphy	Clyda Rovers	0-23	23	5	4.60
5	Eric Hegarty	St. Michael's	2-15	21	5	4.20
6	Brian Coughlan	Kinsale	3-10	19	4	4.75
6	Mícheál Ó Cróinín	Naomh Abán	1-16	19	4	4.75
7	Gearóid Finn	Kinsale	1-15	18	3	6.00
7	Anthony Buckley	St. Vincent's	0-18	18	5	3.60
8	Liam Seartan	Béal Átha'n Ghaorthaidh	0-17	17	3	5.66

In a single game

Rank	Player	Club	Tally	Total	Opposition
1	Billy Dennehy	Kiskeam	2-07	13	Mallow
1	Liam Seartan	Béal Átha'n Ghaorthaidh	0-13	13	Mayfield
2	Conor Murphy	Ballinora	3-02	11	Mayfield
3	Gearóid Finn	Kinsale	1-07	10	Macroom
4	Fiachra Lynch	Valley Rovers	2-03	9	Glenville
4	Cian O'Riordan	Mallow	0-09	9	Carrigaline
4	James Murphy	Clyda Rovers	0-09	9	Kinsale
4	Cian O'Riordan	Mallow	0-09	9	St. Michael's
5	Billy Dennehy	Kiskeam	1-05	8	Valley Rovers
5	Aindrias Ó Coinceannáin	Béal Átha'n Ghaorthaidh	1-05	8	Naomh Abán
5	Mícheál Ó Cróinín	Naomh Abán	0-08	8	Ballinora
