= 2018 Cork Premier Intermediate Football Championship =

- Dates: 8 April 2018 – 1 December 2018
- Teams: 14
- Sponsor: Evening Echo
- Champions: Fermoy (1st title); Darragh O'Carroll (captain); Mick Hennessy (manager)
- Runners-up: St Michael's

Tournament statistics
- Matches played: 21
- Top scorer(s): Daniel Goulding (3-17); Maidhc Ó Duinnín (0-26)

The 2018 Cork Premier Intermediate Football Championship was the 13th staging of the Cork Premier Intermediate Football Championship since its establishment by the Cork County Board in 2006. The championship began on 8 April 2018 and ended on 1 December 2018.

On 21 October 2018, Fermoy won the championship following an 0–11 to 0–07 defeat of St Michael's in the final at Páirc Uí Chaoimh. It was their first ever championship title.

== Results ==
=== Round 1 ===
8 April 2018 Round 1	Na Piarsaigh	0-17 - 1-21 (aet)	Newmarket	Mallow GAA Complex
	C O'Mahony 0-3, A Hogan 0-3, A Keating 0-3, E Glavin 0-2, Evan Sheehan 0-1, E Gunning 0-1, Eoin Sheehan 0-1, K Buckley 0-1, S Forde 0-1, G Joyce 0-1.		C O'Keeffe 0-6, D Culloty 0-5, C Browne 1-0, B Daly 0-3, R O'Keeffe 0-3, TJ Brodie 0-2, M Cottrell 0-1, TJ Brosnan 0-1.

8 April 2018 Round 1	Macroom	1-08 - 0-12	St Michael's	Ovens
	F Goold 0-4, S Kiely 1-0, D Goold 0-2, A Hegarty 0-1, P Lucey 0-1.		P Cronin 0-3, T Deasy 0-3, K Hegarty 0-2, E Hegarty 0-2, L O'Sullivan 0-2.

14 April 2018 Round 1	Castletownbere	1-11 - 1-13	St Vincent's	Inchigeelagh
	G Murphy 0-6, D Fenton 1-1, M Harrington 0-2, R Murphy 0-1, R Dillane 0-1.		JP Murphy 0-4, G McCarthy 1-0, A Buckley 0-2, B Murphy 0-2, G Kelleher 0-1, S Duggan 0-1, P O'Sullivan 0-1, S Cunningham 0-1, C Barry 0-1.

14 April 2018 Round 1	Bandon	1-14 - 0-15	Naomh Abán	Carrigadrohid
	J Mulcahy 1-2, M Sugrue 0-5, B Collins 0-3, P Crowley 0-2, A Murphy 0-1, E O'Donovan 0-1.		M Ó Dúinnín 0-7, D Ó Ceallaigh 0-4, M Ó Liatháin 0-1, C Ó Murchú 0-1, C Ó Críodáin 0-1, D Ó Loingsigh 0-1.

14 April 2018 Round 1	Béal Átha'n Ghaorthaidh	0-11 - 1-11	Éire Óg	Cill na Martra
	D Seartan 0-2, A Ó Coinceannáin 0-2, B Seartan 0-2, D Mac Thomáis 0-2, M Ó Riordáin 0-1, C Ó Loingsigh 0-1, C Ó Duinnín 0-1.		D Goulding 1-5, C O'Callaghan 0-2, D O'Herlihy 0-1, L Sheehan 0-1, E O'Shea 0-1, A O'Connor 0-1.

15 April 2018 Round 1	Bantry Blues	1-08 - 4-08	Fermoy	Páirc Uí Rinn
	A Coakley 1-1, S McSweeney 0-2, T Foley 0-2, G Johnson 0-1, S O'Leary 0-1, S O'Neill 0-1.		R O'Callaghan 1-1, A Aherne 1-0, R McEvoy 1-0, P Clancy 1-0, R O'Hagan 0-3, D O'Flynn 0-3, T Clancy 0-1.

15 April 2018 Round 1	Kanturk	0-10 - 1-08	Nemo Rangers	Mallow GAA Complex
	A Walsh 0-3, M Healy 0-2, P Walsh 0-1, I Walsh 0-1, L McLoughlin 0-1, K Holland 0-1, J Browne 0-1.		C Kiely 1-1, R Kennedy 0-4, S Walsh 0-1, E Dilloughrey 0-1, P Gollogly 0-1.

=== Round 2 ===
24 June 2018 Round 2	Macroom	2-07 - 1-08	Béal Átha'n Ghaorthaidh	Cill na Martra
	R Buckley 1-0, O Murphy 1-0, A Hegarty 0-2, E O'Gorman 0-1, T Dineen 0-1, D Horgan 0-1, D Goold 0-1, F Goold 0-1.		A Ó Coinceannáin 1-4, D Seartan 0-3, L Seartan 0-1.

21 July 2018 Round 2	Bantry Blues	5-13 - 0-05	Na Piarsaigh	Castle Grounds
	S McSweeney 2-1, A Coakley 1-3, R Deane 1-2, S Murray 1-1, S O'Neill 0-2, S Coughlan 0-2, R Daly 0-1, R O'Mahony 0-1.		C O'Mahony 0-2, P Gould 0-1, K Forde 0-1, A Keating 0-1.

18 August 2018 Round 2	Castletownbere	0-05 - 1-13	Kanturk	Ballyvourney
	O Power 0-1, R Dillane 0-1, T Collins 0-1, J Harrington 0-1, D Murphy 0-1.		J Fitzpatrick 1-0, I Walsh 0-3, K Holland 0-2, A Walsh 0-2, C Clernon 0-2, L O'Neill 0-1, R Walsh 0-1, J McLoughlin 0-1, L Murphy 0-1.

=== Relegation playoffs ===
20 October 2018 Round 1	Béal Átha'n Ghaorthaidh	2-17 - 1-09	Na Piarsaigh	Kilmichael
	D Seartan 1-3, A Ó Coinceannáin 1-3, D Mac Thomáis 0-4, B Seartan 0-3, L Seartan 0-1, M Ó Riordáin 0-1, A Ó Loingsigh 0-1, C Ó Loingsigh 0-1.		A Hogan 1-6, C O'Mahony 0-1, S Forde 0-1, E Sheehan 0-1.

24 November 2018 Round 2	Béal Átha'n Ghaorthaidh	w/o - scr.	Castletownbere

1 December 2018 Round 3	Castletownbere	Declared void	Na Piarsaigh

=== Round 3 ===
1 September 2018 Round 3	Bantry Blues	1-15 - 0-13	Macroom	Ballingeary
	A Coakley 0-7, R Deane 1-1, S O'Neill 0-2, B Foley 0-2, D Daly 0-1, S McSweeney 0-1, S Murray 0-1.		F Goold 0-6, D Hegarty 0-2, P Lucey 0-2, E O'Gorman 0-1, A Hegarty 0-1, A Quinn 0-1.

1 September 2018 Round 3	Fermoy	3-08 - 0-05	Kanturk	Kildorrery
	M Brennan 2-1, P de Róiste 1-1, R O'Hagan 0-2, R O'Callaghan 0-1, S Aherne 0-1, T Clancy 0-1, K Morrison 0-1.		I Walsh 0-4, J Browne 0-1.

5 September 2018 Round 3	Naomh Abán	1-11 - 1-08	Nemo Rangers	Cloughduv
	M Ó Duinnín 0-8, D Ó Ceallaigh 1-2, M Ó Liatháin 0-1.		C Kiely 1-2, C O'Donovan 0-3, P Gumley 0-1, E Dilloughrey 0-1, P Kerrigan 0-1.

=== Quarter-finals ===
15 September 2018 Quarter-final	Naomh Abán	2-06 - 0-10	St Vincent's	Cloughduv
	D Ó Ceallaigh 1-1, N Ó Ceallaigh 1-0, M Ó Duinnín 0-3, D Ó Scanaill 0-2.		B Murphy 0-7, W McCarthy 0-1, C Barry 0-1, D O'Regan 0-1.

16 September 2018 Quarter-final	Bantry Blues	1-09 - 2-09	Fermoy	Castle Grounds
	A Coakley 1-3, R Deane 0-2, D Daly 0-1, K Casey 0-1, S McSweeney 0-1, T Foley 0-1.		R O'Hagan 0-4, M Brennan 1-0, A O'Connor 1-0, S Aherne 0-2, D O'Carroll 0-1, P de Róiste 0-1, K Morrison 0-1.

21 September 2018 Quarter-final	Bandon	1-12 - 4-09	Éire Óg	Cloughduv
	M Sugrue 0-9, A Murphy 1-1, C O'Mahony 0-1, J Walsh 0-1.		D Goulding 2-5, J Murphy 1-1, J Cooper 1-0, L Sheehan 0-2, R O'Toole 0-1.

21 September 2018 Quarter-final	Newmarket	0-07 - 0-14	St Michael's	Castle Grounds
	TJ Bodie 0-5, J Ryan 0-1, B O'Connor 0-1.		T Deasy 0-6, D Cremin 0-2, K Hegarty 0-2, L O'Sullivan 0-2, N Cashman 0-1, E Hegarty 0-1.

=== Semi-finals ===
6 October 2018 Semi-final	Éire Óg	1-09 - 0-16	St Michael's	Páirc Uí Rinn
	D Goulding 0-7 (4f, 1 '45'), J Murphy 1-0, L Sheehan 0-1f; R O'Toole 0-1.	Report	D Cremin 0-5, L O'Sullivan 0-4 (2f), E Hegarty 0-4 (2f), P Cronin 0-1, D Lenihan 0-1, E Buckley 0-1.

6 October 2018 Semi-final	Fermoy	1-12 - 0-14	Naomh Abán	Páirc Uí Rinn
	M Brennan 1-3, R O'Hagan 0-4f, L Coleman 0-2 '45'; P De Roiste 0-2, T Clancy 0-1.	Report	M O Duinnin 0-8 (7f), D O hAileamhain 0-4, D O Ceallaigh 0-2 (1f).

=== Final ===
21 October 2018 Final	Fermoy	0-11 - 0-07	St Michael's	Páirc Uí Chaoimh
	P de Róiste, R O Hagan (two frees) 0-4 each, L Coleman (45), P Clancy, T Clancy 0-1 each.	Report	E Hegarty, T Deasy (one free), L O’Sullivan (one free) 0-2 each, E Buckley 0-1 (free).	Referee: J Ryan (Macroom)

== Championship statistics ==
=== Top scorers ===
Overall

Rank	Player	Club	Tally	Total	Matches	Average
1	Daniel Goulding	Éire Óg	3-17	26	3	8.66
1	Maidhc Ó Duinnín	Naomh Abán	0-26	26	4	6.50
2	Arthur Coakley	Bantry Blues	3-14	23	4	5.75
3	Ruairí O'Hagan	Fermoy	0-17	17	5	3.40
4	Martin Brennan	Fermoy	4-04	16	5	3.20
5	Aindrias Ó Coinceannáin	Béal Átha'n Ghaorthaidh	2-09	15	3	5.00
5	Diarmuid Ó Ceallaigh	Naomh Abán	2-09	15	4	3.75

In a single game

Rank	Player	Club	Tally	Total	Opposition
1	Daniel Goulding	Éire Óg	2-05	11	Bandon
2	Alan Hogan	Na Piarsaigh	1-06	9	Béal Átha'n Ghaorthaidh
2	Mark Sugrue	Bandon	0-09	9	Éire Óg
3	Daniel Goulding	Éire Óg	1-05	8	Béal Átha'n Ghaorthaidh
3	Maidhc Ó Duinnín	Naomh Abán	1-05	8	Nemo Rangers
3	Maidhc Ó Duinnín	Naomh Abán	1-05	8	Fermoy
4	Shane McSweeney	Bantry Blues	2-01	7	Na Piarsaigh
4	Martin Brennan	Fermoy	2-01	7	Kanturk
4	Aindrias Ó Coinceannáin	Béal Átha'n Ghaorthaidh	1-04	7	Macroom
4	Maidhc Ó Duinnín	Naomh Abán	0-07	7	Bandon
4	Arthur Coakley	Bantry Blues	0-07	7	Macroom
4	Blake Murphy	St Vincent's	0-07	7	Naomh Abán
4	Daniel Goulding	Éire Óg	0-07	7	St Michael's
