= 2006 Cork Intermediate Football Championship =

Gaelic football competition

- Sponsor: Evening Echo
- Champions: Béal Átha'n Ghaorthaidh (1st title); Peadar Concannon (captain); Mike Concannon (manager)
- Runners-up: Castletownbere

The 2006 Cork Intermediate Football Championship was the 71st staging of the Cork Intermediate Football Championship since its establishment by the Cork County Board in 1909.

The final, a replay, was played on 19 November 2006 at Páirc Uí Rinn in Cork, between Béal Átha'n Ghaorthaidh and Castletownbere, in what was their first ever meeting in the final. Béal Átha'n Ghaorthaidh won the match by 0–05 to 0–04 to claim their first ever championship title.

== Results ==
=== Final ===
12 November 2006 Final	Béal Átha'n Ghaorthaidh	0-09 - 0-09	Castletownbere	Páirc Uí Rinn

=== Final replay ===
19 November 2006 Final replay	Béal Átha'n Ghaorthaidh	0-05 - 0-04	Castletownbere	Páirc Uí Rinn
