= Cork Premier Intermediate Football Championship =

Annual Gaelic football competition

- Current season or competition: 2026 Cork Premier Intermediate Football Championship
- Irish: Craobhchomórtas Peile Príomh Idirmheánach Chorcaí
- Code: Gaelic football
- Founded: 2006; 20 years ago
- Region: Cork (GAA)
- Trophy: Billy Long Cup
- No. of teams: 12
- Title holders: Uíbh Laoire (1st title)
- Most titles: Newmarket (2 titles); Mallow (2 titles); Valley Rovers (2 titles); St Vincent's (2 titles)
- Sponsors: McCarthy Insurance Group
- Official website: Official website

The Cork Premier Intermediate Football Championship (known for sponsorship reasons as McCarthy Insurance Group Cork County Premier Intermediate Football Championship and abbreviated to the Cork PIFC) is an annual Gaelic football competition organised by the Cork County Board of the Gaelic Athletic Association and contested by the top-ranking intermediate clubs in the county of Cork in Ireland. It is the third tier overall in the entire Cork Gaelic football championship system.

The Cork Premier Intermediate Championship was introduced in 2006 following a split in the existing Cork Intermediate Football Championship. At the time of its creation it was the second tier of Cork Gaelic football.

In its current format, the Cork Premier Intermediate Championship begins in April. The 12 participating club are drawn into three groups of four teams and play each other in a round-robin system. The three group winners and the three runners-up proceed to the knockout phase that culminates with the final match at Páirc Uí Rinn in October. The winner of the Cork Premier Intermediate Championship, as well as being presented with the Billy Long Cup, qualifies for the subsequent Munster Intermediate Club Football Championship.

The competition has been won by 17 teams. Mallow, Newmarket, Valley Rovers and St Vincent's are the only teams to have won the championship on more than one occasion. Uíbh Laoire are the title holders, defeating Kiskeam by 4–22 — 0–23 in the 2026 final.

== Format ==
=== Current ===
==== Development ====
On 2 April 2019, a majority of 136 club delegates voted to restructure the championship once again. The new format also led to a reduction in the number of participating clubs from 16 to 12.

==== Overview ====
Group stage: The 12 teams are divided into three groups of four. Over the course of the group stage, which features one game in April and two games in August, each team plays once against the others in the group, resulting in each team being guaranteed at least three games. Two points are awarded for a win, one for a draw and zero for a loss. The teams are ranked in the group stage table by points gained, then scoring difference and then their head-to-head record. The top three teams in each group qualify for the knock-out stage.

Play-off: The second best and third best third placed teams from the group stage play off for last quarter-final place.

Quarter-finals: The play-off winner and the seven top-ranking teams from the group stage contest this round. The four winners from these four games advance to the semi-finals.

Semi-finals: The four quarter-final winners contest this round. The two winners from these four games advance to the semi-finals.

Final: The two semi-final winners contest the final. The winning team are declared champions and gain automatic promotion to the following year's Cork Senior A Championship.

== Teams ==
=== 2027 Teams ===
The 12 teams due to compete in the 2027 Cork Premier Intermediate Football Championship are:

Team	Location	Division	Colours	Poaition in 2026	In Championship since	Championship Titles	Last Championship Title
Aghada	Aghada	Imokilly	Green and white	Group stage	2019	0	—
Ballinora	Ballinora	Muskerry	Green and red	Group stage	2026	0	—
Bantry Blues	Bantry	Carbery	Blue and white	Group stage	2022	0	—
Castletownbere	Castletownbere	Beara	Black and white	Group stage	2013	0	—
Fermoy	Fermoy	Avondhu	Black and amber	Semi-finals	2026	1	2018
Kilmurry	Kilmurry	Muskerry	Green and gold	Intermediate A champions	2027	0	—
Kiskeam	Kiskeam	Duhallow	Black and white	Runners-up	2025	1	2016
Macroom	Macroom	Muskerry	Green and white	Quarter-finals	2011	0	—
Naomh Abán	Ballyvourney	Muskerry	Blue and white	Semi-finals	2011	0	—
Nemo Rangers	Trabeg	Seandún	Black and green	Group stage	2006	0	—
O'Donovan Rossa	Skibbereen	Carbery	Red and white	Senior A relegated	2027	0	—
Rockchapel	Rockchapel	Duhallow	Maroon and white	Quarter-finals	2021	0	—

== Sponsorship ==
Since 2006 the Premier Intermediate Championship has been sponsored by the Evening Echo. McCarthy Insurance Group became the new title sponsor in December 2023.

== Venues ==
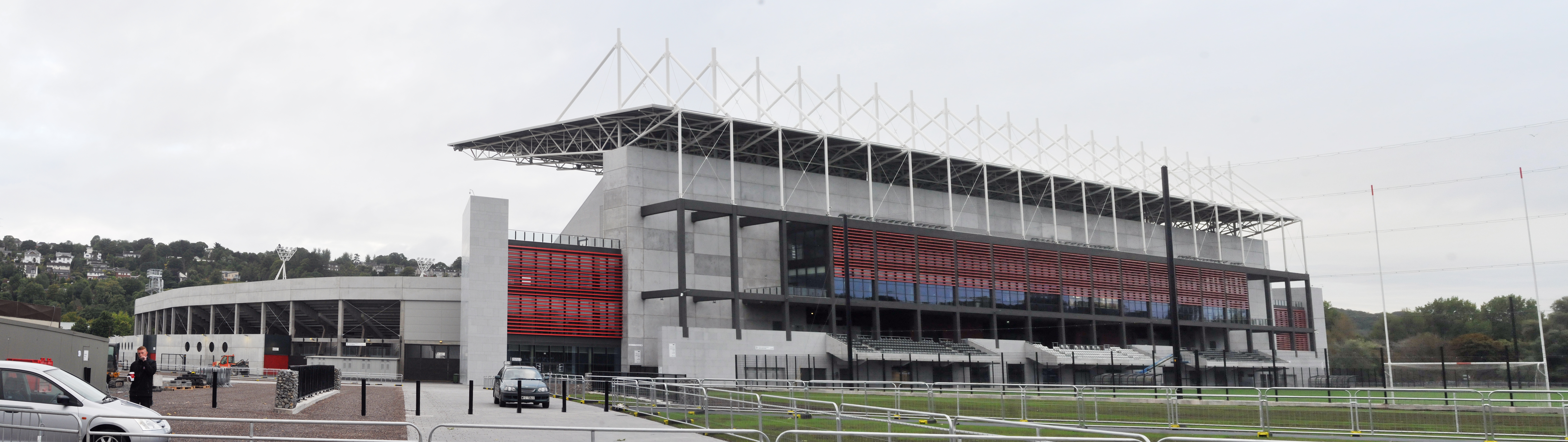
Páirc Uí Chaoimh hosted the 2024 final between Glanmire and Boherbue.

=== Early rounds ===
Fixtures in the opening rounds of the championship are usually played at a neutral venue that is deemed halfway between the participating teams.

=== Final ===
The final has always been played at one of Cork GAA's two main stadiums. On several occasions the final has been played at Páirc Uí Chaoimh, however, Páirc Uí Rinn has sometimes been the venue of choice for the final.

== Trophy ==
The winning team is presented with the Billy Long Cup. Billy Long was involved with the Lees club in the 1940s and 1950s. He was a selector with the Cork senior football team in 1956 and was a member of the County Board Executive.

== List of finals ==
=== Legend ===
- Gold – Munster intermediate club champions
- Silver – Munster intermediate club runners-up

=== List of Cork PIFC finals ===
Year	Winners		Runners-up		Venue	#
Year	Club	Score	Club	Score	Venue	#
2026	Iveleary	4–22	Kiskeam	0–23	Páirc Uí Chaoimh	
2025	Aghabullogue	2–12	Iveleary	2–11	Páirc Uí Chaoimh	
2024	Kilshannig	2-10	Aghabullogue	1-09	Páirc Uí Chaoimh	
2023	Cill Na Martra	3-11	Bantry Blues	2-13	Páirc Uí Chaoimh	
2022	Kanturk	3-11	Bantry Blues	1-10	Páirc Uí Chaoimh	
2021	Newmarket	0-12	Kanturk	0-11	Páirc Uí Chaoimh	
2020	Knocknagree	0-12	Kanturk	0-09	Páirc Uí Chaoimh	
2019	Éire Óg	0-14	St Michael's	0-12	Páirc Uí Rinn	
2018	Fermoy	0-11	St Michael's	0-07	Páirc Uí Chaoimh	
2017	Mallow	1-17	St Michael's	1-16	Páirc Uí Chaoimh	
2016	Kiskeam	2-12	Fermoy	0-14	Páirc Uí Rinn	
2015	Carrigaline	0-12	St Michael's	0-11	Páirc Uí Rinn	
2014	Valley Rovers	0-12	Na Piarsaigh	0-08	Páirc Uí Chaoimh	
2013	Clyda Rovers	0-13	Macroom	0-08	Páirc Uí Chaoimh	
2012	St Vincent's	0-12	St Michael's	0-11	Páirc Uí Chaoimh	
2011	Newmarket	3-06	Clyda Rovers	1-10	Páirc Uí Chaoimh	
2010	Newcestown	0-10	Clyda Rovers	0-09	Páirc Uí Rinn	
2009	Valley Rovers	0-07	Clyda Rovers	0-05	Páirc Uí Chaoimh	
2008	St. Finbarr's	2-13	St Vincent's	0-14	Páirc Uí Chaoimh	
2007	Mallow	1-07	Killavullen	0-07	Páirc Uí Rinn	
2006	St Vincent's	1-05	Glanmire	0-07	Páirc Uí Rinn	

=== Notes ===
- 2006: The final went to two replays after St. Vincent's and Glanmire drew 0–09 apiece and 0–12 apiece.
- 2024: The final went to a replay after Kilshannig and Aghabullogue drew 1–14 apiece.

== Roll of Honour ==
=== By club ===
#	Club	Titles	Runners-up	Championships won	Championships runner-up
1	St Vincent's	2	1	2006, 2012	2008
1	Valley Rovers	2	0	2009, 2014	—
1	Mallow	2	0	2007, 2017	—
1	Newmarket	2	0	2011, 2021	—
5	Clyda Rovers	1	3	2013	2009, 2010, 2011
5	Kanturk	1	2	2022	2020, 2021
5	Kiskeam	1	1	2016	2026
5	Fermoy	1	1	2018	2016
5	Aghabullogue	1	1	2025	2024
5	Uíbh Laoire	1	1	2026	2025
5	St Finbarr's	1	0	2008	—
5	Newcestown	1	0	2010	—
5	Carrigaline	1	0	2015	—
5	Éire Óg	1	0	2019	—
5	Knocknagree	1	0	2020	—
5	Cill Na Martra	1	0	2023	—
5	Kilshannig	1	0	2024	—
18	St Michael's	0	5	—	2012, 2015, 2017, 2018, 2019
18	Bantry Blues	0	2	—	2022, 2023
18	Glanmire	0	1	—	2006
18	Killavullen	0	1	—	2007
18	Macroom	0	1	—	2013
18	Na Piarsaigh	0	1	—	2014

=== By Division ===
#	Division	Titles	Runners-Up	Total	Most recent success
1	Avondhu	5	5	10	2024
1	Duhallow	5	3	8	2022
3	Muskerry	4	3	7	2026
4	Seandún	3	7	10	2012
4	Carrigdhoun	3	0	3	2015
6	Carbery	1	2	3	2010
7	Imokilly	0	1	1	—

== Records and statistics ==
=== Final ===
==== Team ====
- Most wins: 2, joint record:
  - St. Vincent's (2006, 2012)
  - Mallow (2007, 2017)
  - Valley Rovers (2009, 2014)
  - Newmarket (2011, 2021)
- Most appearances in a final: 5, St. Michael's (2012, 2015, 2017, 2018, 2019)
- Most Final appearances without ever winning: 5, St. Michael's (2012, 2015, 2017, 2018, 2019)
- Longest gap between wins: 10 years, joint record:
  - Mallow (2007, 2017)
  - Newmarket (2011, 2021)

=== Top scorers ===
==== By season ====
===== Overall =====
Year	Top scorer	Team	Score	Total
2006	James Murphy	Glanmire	0-39	39
2007	James Murphy	Glanmire	0-21	21
2008	John Paul Murphy	St. Vincent's	0-29	29
2009	James Murphy	Glanmire	2-25	31
2010	David Drake	Carrigaline	0-39	39
2011	Nicky Flanagan	Newmarket	1-24	27
2012	Cian O'Riordan	Mallow	1-28	31
2013	Conor Horgan	Nemo Rangers	1-21	24
2013	Gearóid Finn	Kinsale	0-24	24
2014	Mícheál Ó Cróinín	Naomh Abán	2-26	32
2015	Daniel Goulding	Éire Óg	1-34	37
2016	Daniel Goulding	Éire Óg	1-36	39
2017	Daniel Goulding	Éire Óg	1-27	30
2018	Daniel Goulding	Éire Óg	3-17	26
2018	Maidhc Ó Duinnín	Naomh Abán	0-26	26
2019	Daniel Goulding	Éire Óg		
2020	Fintan O'Connor	Knocknagree	0-28	28
2021	Conor O'Keeffe	Newmarket	0-32	32

== See also ==
- Munster Intermediate Club Football Championship
- Cork Intermediate A Football Championship
