= Ballingeary =

Village in County Cork, Ireland

Ballingeary Béal Átha an Ghaorthaidh
- Village
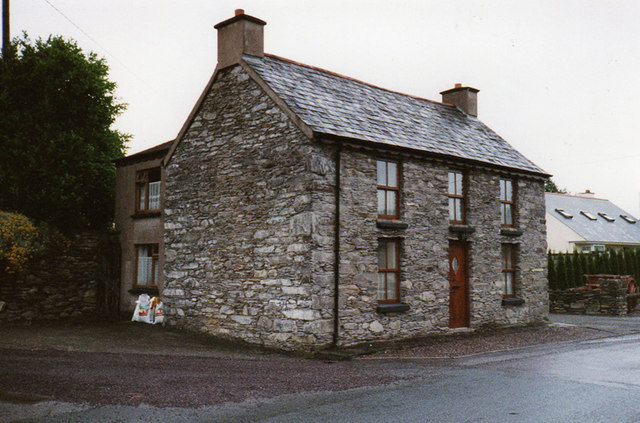
- The former An Óige Youth Hostel

- Location in Ireland
- Coordinates: 51°51′N 9°14′W
- Country: Ireland
- Province: Munster
- County: County Cork

Population (2022)
  - Total: 235
- Website: ballingeary.com

Ballingeary (Irish: Béal Átha an Ghaorthaidh, pronounced [ˌbʲeːl̪ˠ aːh ənˠ ˈɣeːɾˠhiː]) is a village in the Shehy Mountains in County Cork, Ireland.

The village is located within the Muskerry Gaeltacht (Irish-speaking area). According to the 2016 census, over 42% of the population speak Irish on a daily basis outside the education system. In 2022, Ballingeary had the highest proportion of Irish speakers among the population aged three years and over in Ireland, at 89%.

It has an active Irish-language summer school, Coláiste na Mumhan (College of Munster), which was attended by Thomas MacDonagh in the summer of 1906. It also hosts a yearly agricultural and horticultural show.

Ballingeary is 19 km west of Macroom, on the R584 road. The River Lee rises a few kilometres west of the village, at Gougane Barra Park.

== See also ==
- Béal Átha'n Ghaorthaidh GAA
- List of towns and villages in Ireland
- Souperism
