= Glenville GAA =

Gaelic games club in County Cork, Ireland

Glenville
- Gleann an Phréacháin
- Founded: 1887
- County: Cork
- Colours: Black and Gold

Playing kits
Standard colours

Glenville GAA is a Gaelic Athletic Association club based in the village of Glenville, County Cork, Ireland. This is a Gaelic football only club. The club participates in Cork county board and in Imokilly GAA divisional competitions. The club has its main facility in Glenville village with a floodlight pitch and Astroturf playing pitch for winter training. Glenville GAA also has a second floodlight pitch in its training facility in Fouhy Park a few km from the village. Glenville GAA catchment area are the villages of Glenville Watergrasshill and some of the Kildinan district area.

== Achievements ==
- Cork Junior Football Championship Winners (1) 1995
- Cork Minor A Football Championship Runners-Up 1993
- Cork Minor Premier Championship Winners (1) 1994
- East Cork Junior A Football Championship Winners (7) 1948, 1961, 1972, 1973, 1978, 1979, 1995 Runners-Up 1945, 1965, 1971, 1974, 1975, 1982, 1983, 1984, 1985, 1994
- East Cork Junior B Football Championship Winners (5) 1951, 1954,1955,1997,2021
- East Cork Junior C Football Championship Winners (2) 2013, 2017
- Intermediate Football League Winners (2) 2005, 2007
- Tom Creedon Cup Winners 2007
- East Cork Under-21 A Football Championship Winners (2) 1998, 2006
- East Cork Under-21 B Football Championship Winners (4) 1982, 1989, 2014, 2017
- East Cork Minor Div 1 Championship Winners (5) 1993, 2003, 2016, 2021, 2025
- East Cork Minor Div 2 Championship Winners (4) 1986, 1988, 1990, 2015,

== Notable players ==
- Éamonn Ryan Cork Senior player

Kevin o Neill , Paudie Cahill, Noel o Riordan.
