= Béal Átha'n Ghaorthaidh GAA =

Gaelic games club in County Cork, Ireland

Béal Átha'n Ghaorthaidh
- Béal Átha'n Ghaorthaidh
- Founded: 1957
- County: Cork
- Colours
- Grounds: Páirc Traolach Mac Suibhne
- Coordinates: 51°51′03.77″N 9°13′48.37″W

Playing kits
Standard colours

Béal Átha'n Ghaorthaidh GAA is a Gaelic Athletic Association club in Ballingeary, County Cork, Ireland. The club is affiliated to the Muskerry Board and the Cork County Board and is solely concerned with the game of Gaelic football.

== History ==
Located in the village of Ballingeary, about 25km from Macroom in the Muskerry Gaeltacht, Béal Átha'n Ghaorthaidh GAA Club was established in 1957. The club has spent most of its existence operating in the junior grade, winning four Mid Cork JAFC titles between 1965 and 2005. Béal Átha'n Ghaorthaidh had its first success at county level in November 2006, when the club beat Castletownbere in a replay by 0–05 to 0–04 to win the Cork IFC title. Béal Átha'n Ghaorthaidh has also had multiple wins in the annual Comórtas Peile na Gaeltachta. The club won five junior titles between 1984 and 2002. Béal Átha'n Ghaorthaidh beat Naomh Conaill by 2–10 to 0–11 to win the senior title in June 2022.

== Honours ==
- Comórtas Peile na Gaeltachta Sinsear (1): 2022
- Comórtas Peile na Gaeltachta Sóisear (5): 1984, 1991, 1992, 1995, 2002
- Cork Intermediate Football Championship (1): 2006
- Cork Junior B Inter-Divisional Football Championship (1): 2015
- Mid Cork Junior A Football Championship (4): 1965, 1992, 1994, 2005
- Cork Minor C Football County League (1): 2014
- Cork Minor C Football County Championship (2): 2001, 2015

== Notable players ==
- John O'Driscoll: All-Ireland SFC-winner (1989, 1990)
