= 1996 Cork Junior A Football Championship =

- Dates: 29 September – 10 November 1996
- Teams: 9
- Sponsor: TSB Bank
- Champions: Kilshannig (2nd title); Patrick O'Connell (captain); Niall O'Shea (manager)
- Runners-up: Youghal; Philip Monaghan (manager)

Tournament statistics
- Matches played: 8
- Goals scored: 20 (2.5 per match)
- Points scored: 117 (14.63 per match)
- Top scorer(s): Dan O'Brien (3–03); Jimmy Dennehy (0–12)

The 1996 Cork Junior A Football Championship was the 98th staging of the Cork Junior A Football Championship since its establishment by Cork County Board in 1895. The draw for the opening round fixtures took place on 10 December 1995. The championship ran from 29 September to 10 November 1996.

The final was played on 10 November 1996 at Páirc Uí Rinn in Cork, between Kilshannig and Youghal, in what was their first ever meeting in the final. Kilshannig won the match by 1–07 to 0–05 to claim their second championship title overall and a first title since 1985.

Dan O'Brien and Jimmy Dennehy were the championship's joint-top scorers

== Qualification ==
| Division | Championship | Representatives |
|---|---|---|
| Avondhu | North Cork Junior A Football Championship | Deel Rovers; Kilshannig |
| Beara | Beara Junior A Football Championship | Garnish |
| Carbery | South West Junior A Football Championship | Ilen Rovers |
| Carrigdhoun | South East Junior A Football Championship | Valley Rovers |
| Duhallow | Duhallow Junior A Football Championship | Kiskeam |
| Imokilly | East Cork Junior A Football Championship | Youghal |
| Muskerry | Mid Cork Junior A Football Championship | Ballinora |
| Seandún | City Junior A Football Championship | Nemo Rangers |

== Results ==
=== Quarter-finals ===
| 29 September 1996 Quarter-final | Nemo Rangers | 3–08 – 3–06 | Ilen Rovers | Kilmurry Grounds |
| | L O'Sullivan 2–3, C McCarthy 1–0, S Callanan 0–3, B Morgan 0–1, Alan Cronin 0–1. | | F Connolly 1–1, K Daly 1–1, C Collins 1–0, J Whooley 0–2, F Collins 0–1, B O'Sullivan 0–1. |

| 13 October 1996 Quarter-final | Deel Rovers | 3–08 – 0–08 | Ballinora | Glenville Grounds |
| | D O'Brien 2–2, P O'Brien 1–0, R Geary 0–3, M Savage 0–2, M Morrissey 0–1. | | M Twohig 0–3, F Drinan 0–1, M Murphy 0–1, T Conway 0–1, P Cantillon 0–1, D Lynch 0–1. |

| 13 October 1996 Quarter-final | Kiskeam | 1–12 – 0–10 | Valley Rovers | Ballyanley Grounds |
| | J Dennehy 0–7, M Angland 1–0, D O'Leary 0–2, J Herlihy 0–2, T Galvin 0–1. | | E McCarthy 0–4, K McCarthy 0–3, T O'Connell 0–1, D Kiely 0–1, J Crowley 0–1. |

| 20 October 1996 Quarter-final | Youghal | 2–12 – 0–09 | Garnish | Castle Grounds |
| | B Coleman 0–5, K Coleman 1–1, E Coleman 0–4, B Murray 1–0, M Downing 0–1, J Flynn 01. | | R Walsh 0–5, C Murphy 0–2, O O'Sullivan 0–1, K Murphy 0–1. |

=== Semi-finals ===
| 27 October 1996 Semi-final | Deel Rovers | 3–08 – 1–10 | Kiskeam | Kanturk Grounds |
| | D Linehan 1–2, D O'Brien 1–1, M Morrissey 1–0, R Geary 0–2, G Fitzgibbon 0–1, P Buckley 0–1, P O'Brien 0–1. | | J Dennehy 0–5, T Galvin 1–0, J Herlihy 0–2, D Angland 0–1, R Dennehy 0–1, F Murphy 0–1. |

| 27 October 1996 Semi-final | Youghal | 2–07 – 1–07 | Nemo Rangers | Clonmult Memorial Park |
| | J Flynn 2–0, B Coleman 0–3, E Coleman 0–2, M Downing 0–1, B Murray 0–1. | | M Dunne 1–1, S Callanan 0–3, E O'Leary 0–1, C McCarthy 0–1, L O'Sullivan 0–1. |

=== Final ===
| 10 November 1996 Final | Kilshannig | 1–07 – 0–05 | Youghal | Pairc Ui Rinn |
| | W O'Riordan 1–2, N Noonan 0–2, D Ryan 0–2, P O'Connell 0–1. | | K Coleman 0–2, B Coleman 0–2, K Dempsey 0–1. | Referee: S O'Keeffe (St. Michael's) |

== Championship statistics ==
=== Top scorers ===
Overall

| Rank | Player | Club | Tally | Total | Matches | Average |
|---|---|---|---|---|---|---|
| 1 | Dan O'Brien | Deel Rovers | 3–03 | 12 | 2 | 6.00 |
| 1 | Jimmy Dennehy | Kiskeam | 0–12 | 12 | 2 | 6.00 |
| 3 | Liam O'Sullivan | Nemo Rangers | 2–04 | 10 | 2 | 5.00 |
| 3 | Brendan Coleman | Youghal | 0–10 | 10 | 3 | 3.33 |
| 5 | John Flynn | Youghal | 2–01 | 7 | 3 | 2.33 |

In a single game

| Rank | Player | Club | Tally | Total | Opposition |
|---|---|---|---|---|---|
| 1 | Liam O'Sullivan | Nemo Rangers | 2–03 | 9 | Ilen Rovers |
| 2 | Dan O'Brien | Deel Rovers | 2–02 | 8 | Ballinora |
| 3 | Jimmy Dennehy | Kiskeam | 0–07 | 7 | Valley Rovers |
| 4 | John Flynn | Youghal | 2–00 | 6 | Nemo Rangers |
| 5 | Donal Linehan | Deel Rovers | 1–02 | 5 | Kiskeam |
| 5 | William O'Riordan | Kilshannig | 1–02 | 5 | Youghal |
| 5 | Brendan Coleman | Youghal | 0–05 | 5 | Garnish |
| 5 | Robert Walsh | Garnish | 0–05 | 5 | Youghal |
| 5 | Jimmy Dennehy | Kiskeam | 0–05 | 5 | Deel Rovers |

=== Miscellaneous ===
- A delay in the completion of the divisional championships resulted in Deel Rovers and Youghal being nominated to represent Avondhu and Imokilly respectively. Deel Rovers had actually qualified for the county final but were beaten by Kilshannig in the North Cork final, who then took their place in the championship. After being beaten in the final, Youghal were later beaten by Fr. O'Neill's in the East Cork final.
