= 2002 Cork Junior A Football Championship =

- Dates: 20 October – 8 December 2002
- Teams: 8
- Champions: Kiskeam (2nd title); Maurice Angland (captain)
- Runners-up: Adrigole

Tournament statistics
- Matches played: 8
- Goals scored: 10 (1.25 per match)
- Points scored: 148 (18.5 per match)
- Top scorer(s): Niall Cronin (1–11)

The 2002 Cork Junior A Football Championship was the 104th staging of the Cork Junior A Football Championship since its establishment by Cork County Board in 1895. The championship ran from 20 October to 8 December 2002.

The final was played on 8 December 2002 at the Ivealery Grounds in Inchigeelagh, between Kiskeam and Adrigole, in what was their first ever meeting in the final. Kiskeam won the match by 0–19 to 1–00 to claim their second championship title overall and a first title in 38 years.

== Qualification ==
Division	Championship	Champions
Avondhu	North Cork Junior A Football Championship	Mitchelstown
Beara	Beara Junior A Football Championship	Adrigole
Carbery	South West Junior A Football Championship	Tadhg Mac Carthaigh
Carrigdhoun	South East Junior A Football Championship	Ballygarvan
Duhallow	Duhallow Junior A Football Championship	Kiskeam
Imokilly	East Cork Junior A Football Championship	Erin's Own
Muskerry	Mid Cork Junior A Football Championship	Cill na Martra
Seandún	City Junior A Football Championship	Nemo Rangers

== Results ==
=== Quarter-finals ===
20 October 2002 Quarter-final	Kiskeam	4–09 – 0–08	Ballygarvan	Carrigadrohid Grounds
	B Dennehy 2-0, J Herlihy 1-1, D O'Leary 1-1, N Cronin 0-2, S Murphy 0-2, J Angland 0-1, E O'Mahony 0-1, D O'Herlihy 0-1.		A Murphy 0-2, G Spillane 0-2, Cian Ó Conchúir 0-2, Colm Ó Conchúir 0-1, B Daly 0-1.

20 October 2002 Quarter-final	Cill na Martra	1–07 – 0–04	Nemo Rangers	Coachford Grounds
	M Mocháin 1-0, S Ó Loinsigh 0-3, P Ó Buachalla 0-2, R Ó hUidhir 0-1, C Ó Súilleabháin 0-1.		A Hogan 0-3, S Heaphy 0-1.

27 October 2002 Quarter-final	Tadhg Mac Carthaigh	0–09 – 0–09	Mitchelstown	Ballincollig
	N Deasy 0-3, B O'Neill 0-2, T Deasy 0-1, S Murray 0-1, K Barrett 0-1, D O'Brien 0-1.		J Barrett 0-6, J O'Brien 0-1, S Maher 0-1, D Lynch 0-1.

2 November 2002 Quarter-final replay	Tadhg Mac Carthaigh	1–07 – 0–08	Mitchelstown	Páirc Uí Chonchúir
	K Barrett 1-0, T Deasy 0-3, N Deasy 0-1, P Hegarty 0-1, D O'Brien 0-1, M Barrett 0-1.		S Maher 0-1, P Griffin 0-1, J Barrett 0-1, A O'Brien 0-1, K Duggan 0-1, M Allen 0-1, D Lynch 0-1, B Burke 0-1.

3 November 2002 Quarter-final	Adrigole	1–11 – 0–11	Erin's Own	Sam Maguire Park
	K O'Neill 1-1, BJ O'Sullivan 0-4, JL O'Sullivan 0-3, F Carey 0-1, D Carey 0-1, K O'Sullivan 0-1.		M O'Connor 0-4, J Corcoran 0-3, S Murphy 0-2, S Dunne 0-1, M Mulcahy 0-1.

=== Semi-finals ===
3 November 2002 Semi-final	Kiskeam	2–09 – 1–07	Cill na Martra	Banteer Grounds
	N Cronin 1-4, B Dennehy 1-0, D O'Leary 0-3, J Herihy 0-1, J Angland 0-1.		R Hoare 1-5, N O'Leary 0-1, F Buckley 0-1.

10 November 2002 Semi-final	Adrigole	0–11 – 0–10	Tadhg Mac Carthaigh	Wolfe Tone Park
	JL O'Sullivan 0-5, K O'Neill 0-2, D O'Sullivan 0-2, F Carey 0-1, BJ O'Sullivan 0-1.		T Deasy 0-4, D O'Brien 0-3, S O'Sullivan 0-1, I Kingston 0-1, J Herlihy 0-1.

=== Final ===
8 December 2002 Final	Kiskeam	0–19 – 0–09	Adrigole	Inchigeelagh Grounds
	N Cronin 0–5 (0–3 frees); D O’Leary (0–1 free), D Herlihy, J Angland, B Dennehy 0–3 each; M Angland, J Dennehy (free) 0–1 each.		BJ O’Sullivan 0–3 (0–1 free, 0–1 45); M Harrington 0–3; T O’Shea, F Carey, D Carey 0–1 each.	Referee: D Linehan (Nemo Rangers)

== Championship statistics ==
=== Top scorers ===
Rank	Player	Club	Tally	Total	Matches	Average
1	Niall Cronin	Kiskeam	1-11	14	3	4.66
2	Billy Dennehy	Kiskeam	3-03	12	3	4.00
3	Donal O'Leary	Kiskeam	1-07	10	3	3.33
4	Richard Hoare	Cill na Martra	1-06	9	2	4.50
5	Brendan Jer O'Sullivan	Adrigole	0-08	8	3	2.66
5	Tadhg Deasy	Tadhg Mac Carthaigh	0-08	8	3	2.66
5	John Lack O'Sullivan	Adrigole	0-08	8	2	4.00
