= 1971 Cork Junior Football Championship =

Sports event in Cork, Ireland

- Dates: 24 October – 19 December 1971
- Teams: 8
- Champions: Glanworth (2nd title); D. J. Ryan (captain)
- Runners-up: Adrigole; Kevin Jer O'Sullivan (captain)

Tournament statistics
- Matches played: 8
- Goals scored: 22 (2.75 per match)
- Points scored: 123 (15.38 per match)

The 1971 Cork Junior Football Championship was the 73rd staging of the Cork Junior A Football Championship since its establishment by Cork County Board in 1895. The championship ran from 24 October to 19 December 1971.

The final was played on 19 December 1971 at Coachford Sportsfield, between Glanworth and Adrigole, in what was their first ever meeting in the final. Glanworth won the match by 1–08 to 0–08 to claim their first ever championship title.

== Qualification ==
Division	Championship	Champions
Avondhu	North Cork Junior A Football Championship	Glanworth
Beara	Beara Junior A Football Championship	Adrigole
Carbery	South West Junior A Football Championship	Bandon
Carrigdhoun	South East Junior A Football Championship	Shamrocks
Duhallow	Duhallow Junior A Football Championship	Ballydesmond
Imokilly	East Cork Junior A Football Championship	Glanmire
Muskerry	Mid Cork Junior A Football Championship	Naomh Abán
Seandún	City Junior A Football Championship	Bishopstown

== Results ==
=== Quarter-finals ===
24 October 1971 Quarter-final	Bishopstown	3–12 – 0–01	Shamrocks	Manning Park

24 October 1971 Quarter-final	Ballydesmond	2–06 – 1–05	Glanmire	O'Connell Park
	D O'Connor 1–1, A O'Connor 1–0, J Murphy 0–2, D Dennehy 0–2, T Murphy 0–1.		JJ Long 1–3, N Long 0–1, J Whyte 0–1.

31 October 1971 Quarter-final	Glanworth	2–12 – 0–08	Naomh Abán	Kanturk Grounds
	J Courtney 1–4, T Linehan 1–1, B McAuliffe 0–3, D Ahern 0–2, P McCarthy 0–1, A Fahy 0–1.		S Mullane 0–5, J Lynch 0–2, J Lucey 0–1.

7 November 1971 Quarter-final	Adrigole	1–08 – 2–05	Bandon	Wolfe Tone Park
	KJ O'Sullvan 1-0, N O'Sullivan 0-3, M Regan 0-3, M O'Neill 0-2.		P Harrington 1-0, R Crowley 1-0, D Crowley 0-3, J Gabriel 0-2.

5 December 1971 Quarter-final replay	Adrigole	2–08 – 2–06	Bandon	Ballingeary Grounds
	N Sullivan 1–1, E Sullivan 0–4, P Sullivan 1–0, M Regan 0–2, T O'Neill 0–1.		A Smith 2–5, D Crowley 0–1.	Referee: P Finnegan

=== Semi-finals ===
28 November 1971 Semi-final	Glanworth	1–17 – 1–05	Bishopstown	Castlelyons Grounds
	J Courtney 0–8, P McCarthy 1–2, T Linehan 0–2, B McAuliffe 0–2, L Cummins 0–1, A Fahy 0–1.		B Vaughan 1–1, N Galway 0–2, J Hynes 0–1, T Ahern 0–1.

12 December 1971 Semi-final	Adrigole	4–07 – 0–07	Ballydesmond	Ballingeary Grounds
	T O'Neill 2–4, M Carey 1–1, EJ O'Sullivan 1–0, M O'Regan 0–2.		T Murphy 0–4, D Dennehy 0–3.

=== Final ===
19 December 1971 Final	Glanworth	1–08 – 0–08	Adrigole	Coachford Sportsfield
	DJ Ryan 1–0, J Courtney 0–3, P McCarthy 0–2, B McAuliffe 0–1, D Ahern 0–1, T Linehan 0–1.		M Regan 0–4, M Carey 0–1, P O'Sullivan 0–1, KJ O'Sullivan 0–1, EJ O'Sullivan 0–1.	Referee: F Halbert
