= 2023 Cork Premier Intermediate Football Championship =

18th staging of the Cork Premier Intermediate Football Championship

- Dates: 28 July - 29 October 2023
- Teams: 12
- Sponsor: Bon Secours Hospital
- Champions: Cill na Martra (1st title); Gearóid Ó Goillidhe (captain); John Evans (manager)
- Runners-up: Bantry Blues; Seán O'Leary (captain); David O'Donovan (manager)
- Relegated: Na Piarsaigh

Tournament statistics
- Matches played: 24
- Goals scored: 62 (2.58 per match)
- Points scored: 525 (21.88 per match)
- Top scorer(s): Arthur Coakley (3-20)

The 2023 Cork Premier Intermediate Football Championship was the 18th staging of the Cork Premier Intermediate Football Championship since its establishment by the Cork County Board in 2006. The draw for the group stage placings took place on 11 December 2022. The championship ran from 28 July to October 2023.

The final was played on 29 October 2023 at Páirc Uí Chaoimh in Cork, between Cill na Martra and Bantry Blues, in what was their first ever meeting in the final. Cill na Martra won the match by 3-11 to 2-13 to claim their first ever championship title.

Arthur Coakley was the championship's top scorer with 3-20.

== Team changes ==
=== To Championship ===
Promoted from the Cork Intermediate A Football Championship

- Kilshannig

Relegated from the Cork Senior A Football Championship

- Bandon

=== From Championship ===
Promoted to the Cork Senior A Football Championship

- Kanturk

Relegated to the Cork Intermediate A Football Championship

- St. Vincent's

== Group A ==
=== Group A table ===
Knockout stage Relegation playoff

Team	Matches				Score			Pts
Team	Pld	W	D	L	For	Against	Diff	Pts
Castletownbere	3	3	0	0	40	33	7	6
Nemo Rangers	3	1	0	1	51	49	2	2
Rockchapel	3	1	0	2	50	49	1	2
Bandon	3	1	0	2	42	52	-10	2

=== Group A results ===
29 July 2023 Round 1	Bandon	1-09 - 2-13	Rockchapel	Clondrohid Grounds
	M Sugrue (0-6f), M McNamara (1-0), D Crowley (0-2), J Calnan (0-1).	Report	J McAuliffe (1-1), Ciar Curtin (1-1, 1f), M McAuliffe (0-4), J Curtin (0-3 frees), Cor Curtin, S Hickey, E Murphy, K Collins (0-1 each).	Referee: P O'Leary (Cloughduv)

29 July 2023 Round 1	Castletownbere	0-11 - 1-07	Nemo Rangers	St Mary's Park
	G Murphy 0-7 (0-2 f), Ó Murphy, A O’Sullivan, F Fenner, D Dunne 0-1 each.	Report	R Corkery 0-4 (0-1 f), J Coogan 1-0, R Dalton 0-2, J O’Donovan 0-1.	Referee: N Hayes

19 August 2023 Round 2	Nemo Rangers	2-12 - 2-13	Bandon	Carrigadrohid Grounds
	J Coogan 1-2, L Horgan 1-0, R Dalton 0-3 (0-1 f), R Corkery 0-3, E Mangan 0-2, S Burke, C Kiely 0-1 each.	Report	P Calnan 1-2, M Sugrue 0-5 (0-4 f), C Calnan 1-0, A O’Mahony, J Mulcahy 0-2, P Murphy, C Long 0-1 each.	Referee: M Collins

20 August 2023 Round 2	Rockchapel	2-06 - 1-11	Castletownbere	Clondrohid Grounds
	J Curtin 0-5 (0-3 f), L Collins, Ciaran Curtin 1-0 each, Cormac Curtin 0-1.	Report	J Harrington 1-1, G Murphy (0-1 f), T Murphy (0-3 f) 0-4 each, L Kelly, J Rosales 0-1 each.	Referee: P O'Leary (Kilmurry)

9 September 2023 Round 3	Bandon	0-11 - 0-15	Castletownbere	Caheragh Grounds
	A O’Mahony 0-5 (0-4 f), C Long (0-1 f), D Crowley 0-2 each, M Sugrue and M Cahalane 0-1 each.	Report	G Murphy 0-4 (0-3 f), J Harrington 0-3, B Murphy, Kelly 0-2 each, D Hegarty (45), T Collins, T Murphy (f), F Fenner 0-1 each.	Referee: A O'Connor (Ballygarvan)

9 September 2023 Round 3	Rockchapel	2-13 - 4-11	Nemo Rangers	Jack Fitzgerald Memorial Park
	J Curtin 1-5, M McAuliffe 1-2, S Hickey 0-3 (0-1 f), J O Callaghan 0-2, S Curtin 0-1.	Report	C Kiely 2-1, J Coogan 0-6 (0-1 f), C Dalton 1-1, E Mangan 1-0, J O Donovan, L O'Sullivan, S O'Dwyer 0-1 each.	Referee: P O'Leary

== Group B ==
=== Group B table ===
Knockout stage Relegation playoff

Team	Matches				Score			Pts
Team	Pld	W	D	L	For	Against	Diff	Pts
Bantry Blues	3	2	1	0	33	38	5	5
Iveleary	3	2	0	1	49	41	8	4
Naomh Abán	3	1	0	2	37	40	-3	2
Macroom	3	0	1	2	39	49	-10	1

=== Group B results ===
28 July 2023 Round 1	Macroom	1-09 - 1-14	Naomh Abán	Cill na Martra Grounds
	E O’Leary (1-2), A Quinn (0-4), D Horgan (0-2, 0-1 f), R Buckley (0-1).	Report	E Ó Mír (0-5, 0-3 f), Dermot Ó Ceallaigh (0-4, 0-1 f), Danny Ó Ceallaigh (1-0), A Ó Luasa (0-2), C Ó Críodáin, D Ó hAllamháin agus D Ó Laoire (0-1 each).	Referee: J Forbes (Dohenys)

29 July 2023 Round 1	Bantry Blues	1-14 - 1-12	Iveleary	Kealkill Grounds
	P Cronin 0-6 (0-3 f), S O’Leary 1-2, K Casey 0-3, A Coakley 0-2, B Foley 0-1.	Report	C Óg Jones, C Vaughan (0-1 f) 0-4 each, I Jones 1-1, B O'Leary 0-2, S Riordan.

19 August 2023 Round 2	Iveleary	2-13 - 1-11	Macroom	Cill na Martra Grounds
	C Óg Jones 0-5, C Vaughan 0-5 f, C O’Leary, L Kearney 1-1 each, C O’Riordan 0-1.	Report	D Horgan 0-5 (0-4 f), D Twomey 1-0, A Quinn, S Kiely 0-2 each, J O’Riordan E O’Leary 0-1 each.	Referee: A Whelton

20 August 2023 Round 2	Naomh Abán	0-10 - 1-10	Bantry Blues	Inchigeelagh Grounds
	E Ó Mír 0-5 (0-2 f), D Ó Ceallaigh, C Ó Criodain 0-2 each, A Ó Luasa 0-1.	Report	R Deane 1-2 (0-1 f), P Cronin 0-4 (0-1 f), S Keevers 0-2, M Casey, A Coakley 0-1 each.	Referee: J Enright

9 September 2023 Round 3	Bantry Blues	1-10 - 0-13	Macroom	Ballingeary Grounds
	P Cronin 1-4 (0-2 fr); A Coakley 0-2; M Óg O’Sullivan, S O’Leary, K Casey, C O’Brien 0-1 each.	Report	F Goold, D Horgan 0-4 f each; A Quinn 0-2; T Dineen, E O’Leary (f), B O’Gorman 0-1 each.	Referee: C Egan (Clyda Rovers)

9 September 2023 Round 3	Iveleary	2-09 - 0-10	Naomh Abán	Carrigadrohid Grounds
	C Óg Jones 1-4, C Vaughan 0-3 f, D O’Donovan 1-0, T Roberts, I Jones 0-1 each.	Report	É Ó Mír 0-5 (0-3 f), C Ó Criodáin 0-2, Dónal Ó Ceallaigh, D Ó Laoire, A Ó Luasa 0-1 each.	Referee: M Collins (CLonakilty)

== Group C ==
=== Group C table ===
Knockout stage Relegation playoff

Team	Matches				Score			Pts
Team	Pld	W	D	L	For	Against	Diff	Pts
Kilshannig	3	2	1	0	57	23	34	5
Cill na Martra	3	2	1	0	49	31	18	5
Aghada	3	1	0	2	49	38	11	2
Na Piarsaigh	3	0	0	3	29	92	-63	0

=== Group C results ===
29 July 2023 Round 1	Cill na Martra	0-11 - 0-08	Aghada	Cloughduv Grounds
	M Ó Deasúna 0-6 (0-5 f), M Ó Duinnín 0-3, F Ó hÉalaithe, C Ó Duinnín 0-1 each.	Report	D Byrne (f), D Creedon (0-2 f) 0-3 each, T Hartnett, J Norris 0-1 each.	Referee: S Scanlon (Newcestown)

29 July 2023 Round 1	Na Piarsaigh	0-05 - 2-25	Kilshannig	Grenagh Grounds
	C O’Meara 0-3 (0-2 f), S Cooke, C Horgan 0-1 each.	Report	T Cunningham 1-5 (0-2 f), D O’Sullivan 1-3, B Creedon 0-4, C O’Shea, A O’Connell 0-3 each, C O’Sullivan 0-3 (0-2 f), J Twomey 0-2, B Guerin, B Curtin 0-1 each.

19 August 2023 Round 2	Aghada	3-24 - 2-05	Na Piarsaigh	Páirc Uí Chonaill
	D Creedon 1-14 (0-7 f), D Phelan 2-1, D Byrne 0-4 f, A Berry 0-3, J O’Hanlon, C Hegarty 0-1 each.	Report	C Hogan 1-2, D Maguire 1-1, SP Cooke, K O’Meara 0-1 each.	Referee: C Murphy (Glanworth)

20 August 2023 Round 2	Kilshannig	0-10 - 1-07	Cill na Martra	Páirc Eoin Mhic Charthaigh
	C O’Sullivan, C O’Shea, J Twomey, K Twomey (f) 0-2 each, K O’Hanlon, T Cunningham (f) 0-1 each.	Report	D O hUrdail 1-0, D O’Duinnin and M O’Duinnin 0-2 each, T O Corcora, D O Conaill, F O hEalaithe 0-1 each.	Referee: M Maher (St Finbarr's)

9 September 2023 Round 3	Aghada	1-05 - 0-16	Kilshannig	Glenville Grounds
	D Creedon 1-0; T Hartnett 0-2; D Phelan, P O’Neill, D Byrne (f) 0-1 each.	Report	K Twomey 0-5 (0-2 f); T Cunningham, K O’Hanlon (f), E O’Hanlon, D O’Sullivan 0-2 each, C O’Shea, C O’Sullivan, Bill Curtin 0-1 each.	Referee: C Walsh (Nemo Rangers)

9 September 2023 Round 3	Cill na Martra	5-13 - 2-07	Na Piarsaigh	Cloughduv Grounds
	S Ó Duinnín 2-5, M Ó Deasúna 1-3 (2f), D Ó Duinnín and C Ó Meachair 1-0 each, D Ó Conail 0-3, D Ó hUrdail and F Ó hEalaithe 0-1 each.	Report	S Forde 0-5 (1f), K O Meara and A Hogan 1-0 each, E Dorgan and A Burke 0-1 each.	Referee: S Scanlon (Newcestown)

== Knockout stage ==
=== Bracket ===
Quarter-Finals
TBD
TBD
TBD
TBD

Semi-Finals
TBD
TBD
TBD
TBD

Final
TBD
TBD

=== Relegation playoff ===
24 September 2023 Playoff	Macroom	1-09 - 1-06	Na Piarsaigh	Éire Óg Grounds
	E O’Leary 1-2, F Gould (0-1 45), S Kiely 0-3 each, D Horgan 0-1 m.	Report	A Hogan 0-5 f, K O’Meara 1-0, K Buckley 0-1 45.	Referee: J Fornes (Dohenys)

=== Quarter-finals ===
22 September 2023 Quarter-final	Cill na Martra	2-11 - 0-12	Iveleary	Castle Grounds
	C Ó Duinnín 2-2, M Ó Duinnín, D Ó Duinnín (0-1 f) 0-2 each, S Ó Fóirréidh, D Ó hUrdail, M Ó Deasúna (f), T Ó Corcora, F Ó hEalaithe 0-1 each.	Report	C Óg Jones 0-5, C Vaughan 0-3 (0-2 f), I Jones 0-2, B Cronin, C O’Riordan 0-1 each.	Referee: M Collins (Clonakilty)

24 September 2023 Quarter-final	Bantry Blues	3-12 - 2-06	Nemo Rangers	St Mary's Park
	A Coakley 2-4 (0-3f); S Coughlan 1-0, S O’Leary 0-4 (1f, 1m), P Cronin 0-2, J Sheedy, C O’Brien 0-1 each.	Report	C Dalton 2-0, C Kiely 0-3 (0-1f), B O’Neill, E Nation, C Cusack 0-1 each.	Referee: P O'Leary (Kilmurry)

=== Semi-finals ===
7 October 2023 Semi-final	Kilshannig	1-11 - 1-12	Bantry Blues	Coachford Grounds
	T Cunningham 1-2 (0-1 f), K Twomey 0-3 (0-1 f), C O’Sullivan, J Twomey, E O’Hanlon, B Curtin, A O’Connell, C McMahon 0-1 each.	Report	R Deane 1-3 (0-3 f), A Coakley 0-5 (0-2 f), P Cronin 0-2 (0-1m), K Casey, S O’Leary 0-1 each.	Referee: P O'Leary (Cloughduv)

8 October 2023 Semi-final	Castletownbere	1-07 - 2-12	Cill na Martra	Wolfe Tone Park
	J Harrington 0-3 (0-1 f), B Murphy 1-0, G Murphy 0-2, D Hegarty (0-1 free), F Fenner (0-1 free) 0-1 each.	Report	D Ó Duinnín 1-4 (0-2 f), M Ó Duinnín 1-2, D Ó hUrdail 0-3, C Mac Lochlainn, S Ó Duinnín, C Ó Duinnín 0-1 each.	Referee: J Regan (Lough Rovers)

=== Final ===
29 October 2023 Final	Bantry Blues	2-13 - 3-11	Cill na Martra	Páirc Uí Chaoimh
	A Coakley 1-6 (0-3f), R Deane 1-2 (0-1f), S O’Leary, P Cronin, K Casey, S Keevers, C O’Brien 0-1 each.	Report	M Ó Duinnín 1-2, D Ó Duinnín 1-1 (0-1f), S Ó Duinnín 0-3, C Ó Meachair 1-0, C Ó Duinnín, D Ó hUrdail 0-2 each, D Ó Conaill 0-1 each.	Referee: C Dineen (Douglas)

== Championship statistics ==
=== Top scorers ===
Overall

Rank	Player	County	Tally	Total	Matches	Average
1	Arthur Coakley	Bantry Blues	3-20	29	6	4.83
2	Danny Creedon	Aghada	2-17	23	3	7.66
3	Paddy Cronin	Bantry Blues	1-19	22	6	3.66
4	Chris Óg Jones	Iveleary	1-18	21	4	5.25
5	Dan Ó Duinnín	Cill na Martra	3-09	18	6	3.00
6	Maidhcí Ó Duinnín	Cill na Martra	2-11	17	6	2.83
7	Ruairí Deane	Bantry Blues	3-07	16	4	4.00
7	Tom Cunningham	Kilshannig	2-10	16	4	4.00
7	Jack Curtin	Rockchapel	1-13	16	3	5.33
7	Gary Murphy	Castletownbere	0-16	16	4	4.00

In a single game

Rank	Player	Club	Tally	Total	Opposition
1	Danny Creedon	Aghada	1-14	17	Na Piarsaigh
2	Shane Ó Duinnín	Cill na Martra	2-05	11	Na Piarsaigh
3	Arthur Coakley	Bantry Blues	2-04	10	Nemo Rangers
4	Arthur Coakley	Bantry Blues	1-06	9	Cill na Martra
5	Ciarán Ó Duinnín	Cill na Martra	2-02	8	Iveleary
5	Tom Cunningham	Kilshannig	1-05	8	Na Piarsaigh
5	Jack Curtin	Rockchapel	1-05	8	Nemo Rangers
8	Diarmuid Phelan	Aghada	2-01	7	Na Piarsaigh
8	Colm Kiely	Nemo Rangers	2-01	7	Rockchapel
8	Dan Ó Duinnín	Cill na Martra	1-04	7	Castletownbere
8	Chris Óg Jones	Iveleary	1-04	7	Naomh Abán
8	Paddy Cronin	Bantry Blues	1-04	7	Macroom
8	Gary Murphy	Castletownbere	0-07	7	Nemo Rangers
