= 1967 Cork Junior Football Championship =

- Dates: 15 October 1967 – 10 March 1968
- Teams: 9
- Champions: Newcestown (1st title); T. J. Collins (captain)
- Runners-up: Midleton

Tournament statistics
- Matches played: 8
- Goals scored: 19 (2.38 per match)
- Points scored: 95 (11.88 per match)

The 1967 Cork Junior Football Championship was the 69th staging of the Cork Junior A Football Championship since its establishment by Cork County Board in 1895. The championship began on 15 October 1967 but was not completed until 10 March 1967 due to an outbreak of foot and mouth disease.

The final was played on 10 March 1968 at the Athletic Grounds in Cork, between Newcestown and Midleton, in what was their first ever meeting in the final. Newcestown won the match by 2–12 to 1–02 to claim their first ever championship title.

== Qualification ==
Division	Championship	Champions
Avondhu	North Cork Junior A Football Championship	Kilshannig
Beara	Beara Junior A Football Championship	Castletownbere
Carbery	South West Junior A Football Championship	Newcestown
Carrigdhoun	South East Junior A Football Championship	Carrigaline
Duhallow	Duhallow Junior A Football Championship	Cullen
Imokilly	East Cork Junior A Football Championship	Midleton
Muskerry	Mid Cork Junior A Football Championship	Kilmurry; Naomh Abán
Seandún	City Junior A Football Championship	Nemo Rangers

== Results ==
=== Quarter-finals ===
15 October 1967 Quarter-final	Newcestown	1–09 – 1–05	Carrigaline	Millstreet Town Park
	F Collins 0–4, J O'Callaghan 1–0, J McCarthy 0–2, M O'Callaghan 0–2, D Kehilly 0–1.		J Foster 1–2, B Wiley 0–2, J Murphy 0–1.

5 November 1967 Quarter-final	Kilmurry	1–04 – 0–04	Cullen	Millstreet Town Park

5 November 1967 Quarter-final	Castletownbere	0–09 – 0–07	Nemo Rangers	Rossa Park

5 November 1967 Quarter-final	Midleton	0–09 – 1–04	Kilshannig	Páirc Mac Gearailt
	W Glavin 0–4, C Moroney 0–2, P Fitzgerald 0–1, W O'Regan 0–1, A O'Donoghue 0–1.		M Cronin 1–0, J Horgan 0–3, J O'Flynn 0–1.

=== Semi-finals ===
19 November 1967 Semi-final	Midleton	3–06 – 3–06	Castletownbere	Sam Maguire Park
	P O'Sullivan 2–1, M Sexton 1–1, W O'Regan 0–2, D O'Donoghue 0–2.		J O'Sullivan 1–1, S O'Sullivan 1–0, D Harrington 1–0, M O'Driscoll 0–2, M O'Sullivan 0–2, B Hanley 0–1.

26 November 1965 Semi-final	Newcestown	3–07 – 1–04	Naomh Abán	Castle Grounds
	F Collins 1–2, P Crowley 1–1, S Ryan 1–0, K Kehilly 0–2, N Kehilly 0–1, K Callanan 0–1.		J Lucey 0–4, C Lucey 1–0.

26 November 1967 Semi-final replay	Midleton	1–04 – 1–03 (abandoned)	Castletownbere	Sam Maguire Park
	M Sexton 1–0, P O'Sullivan 0–1, W Glavin 0–1, D O'Donoghue 0–1, C O'Sullivan 0–1.		PE O'Sullivan 1–1, M O'Driscoll 0–1, B Hanley 0–1.

=== Final ===
10 March 1968 Final	Newcestown	2–12 – 1–02	Midleton	Cork Athletic Grounds
	M O'Callaghan 1–8, F Collins 1–1, J McCarthy 0–1, N Kehilly 0–1, K Kehilly 0–1.		M Lovett 1–0, L Glavin 0–2.	Referee: P Cronin (St. Finbarr's)

== Championship statistics ==
=== Miscellaneous ===
- The semi-final replay between Midleton and Castletownbere was called off by the referee nine minutes into the second half when a player who had been sent off returned to the field of play and refused to leave. The match was later awarded to Midleton.
