= 2012 Cork Intermediate Football Championship =

77th staging of the Cork Intermediate Football Championship

- Dates: 29 April – 14 October 2012
- Teams: 16
- Sponsor: Evening Echo
- Champions: Castletownbere (2nd title); Alan O'Regan (captain); Morgan O'Sullivan (manager)
- Runners-up: Éire Óg
- Relegated: Killavullen

Tournament statistics
- Matches played: 29
- Goals scored: 47 (1.62 per match)
- Points scored: 589 (20.31 per match)
- Top scorer(s): Alan O'Regan (2-24)

The 2012 Cork Intermediate Football Championship was the 77th staging of the Cork Intermediate Football Championship since its establishment by the Cork County Board in 1909. The draw for the opening round fixtures took place on 11 December 2011. The championship ran from 29 April to 14 October 2012.

The final was played on 14 October 2012 at Páirc Uí Rinn in Cork, between Castletownbere and Éire Óg, in what was their first ever meeting in the final. Castletownbere won the match by 1–12 to 0–13 to claim their second championship title overall and a first title in 26 years.

Castletownbere's Alan O'Regan was the championship's Top scorer with 2-24.

== Results ==
=== First round ===
29 April 2012 First round	Grenagh	1-18 - 0-07	Killavullen	Mallow GAA Complex
	D Dorgan 0-8, G Russell 1-2, P Sexton 0-3, T Kenny 0-2, C Fitzgerald 0-2, T Walsh 0-1.		A O'Driscoll 0-2, D Dorgan 0-2, E Sheehan 0-1, C O'Connell 0-1, B Murphy 0-1.

5 May 2012 First round	Fermoy	1-09 - 0-09	Glanworth	Castletownroche Grounds
	J Campion 1-3, A O'Connor 0-2, R O'Callaghan 0-1, R O'Hagan 0-1, D O'Carroll 0-1, J Hutchings 0-1.		P O'Driscoll 0-4, D Pyne 0-2, D Gallagher 0-2, M Sheehan 0-1.

5 May 2012 First round	Ballydesmond	1-12 - 0-08	Cill na Martra	Dromtarriffe Grounds
	D O'Connor 0-9, N Fleming 1-2, B O'Callaghan 0-1.		C Ó hUidhir 0-6, M Ó Conchúir 0-1, C Ó Súilleabháin 0-1.

5 May 2012 First round	Canovee	2-08 - 1-08	Aghabullogue	Kilmichael Grounds
	P Dunlea 1-2, A Cronin 1-1, S O'Connor 0-2, D O'Sullivan 0-2, E Lyons 0-1.		M O'Sullivan 1-1, I O'Sullivan 0-3, D Cullinane 0-2, J Corkery 0-2.

5 May 2012 First round	Glanmire	1-11 - 1-13	Kildorrery	Páirc Bhríde
	D Molden 1-6, K Kenneally 0-3, M Cussen 0-1, M Connolly 0-1.		E O'Connor 0-5, D White 1-0, (pen), T Monaghan 0-3, P O'Brien 0-2, D Kelly 0-1, S Fitzgerald 0-1, W Fouhy 0-1.

5 May 2012 First round	Youghal	1-10 - 0-10	Adrigole	Castle Grounds
	J Ormonde 1-1, A Frahill-O'Connor 0-3, K Dempsey 0-2, A Curtin 0-1, C Spillane 0-1, D O'Mahony 0-1, B Goggin 0-1.		K Goggin 0-4, K Ger O'Sullivan 0-3, D Harrington 0-2, K O'Sullivan 0-1.

12 May 2012 First round	Cloyne	1-05 - 1-12	Éire Óg	Riverstown Sportsfield
	Paul O'Sullivan 1-0, D O'Sullivan 0-2, J Nyhan 0-2, C Lomasney 0-1.		D Goulding 1-5, J Dineen 0-5, K Hallissey 0-1, C Sheehan 0-1.

13 May 2012 First round	Castletownbere	0-07 - 1-07	Kanturk	Páirc Traolach Mac Suibhne
	D Fenton 0-3, A O'Sullivan 0-2, A O'Regan 0-1, D Nolan 0-1.		A Nash 1-0, D Duane 0-3, K Holland 0-2, M Healy 0-1, A Walsh 0-1.

=== Second round ===
3 June 2012 Second round	Killavullen	1-06 - 1-09	Glanworth	Moore Park
	A O'Driscoll 1-0, D Dorgan 0-3, B Norris 0-3.		D Pyne 0-6, M Pyne 1-0, M Sheehan 0-1, B Gallagher 0-1, P O'Driscoll 0-1.

17 June 2012 Second round	Castletownbere	0-11 - 1-14	Adrigole	Páirc Gairinis
	A O'Regan 0-6, D Fenton 0-2, D Nolan 0-1, G Healy 0-1, S Bán O'Sullivan 0-1.		K Goggin 0-6 B Jer O'Sullivan 1-1, K Jer O'Sullivan 0-3, D Harrington 0-2, E Jer O'Sullivan 0-1, T Joe O'Sullivan 0-1.

17 June 2012 Second round	Cill na Martra	1-13 - 0-10	Glanmire	Jack Fitzgerald Memorial Park
	S Kelleher 1-2, M Dineen 0-4, M O'Connor 0-4, K Hoare 0-1, D Óg O'Leary 0-1, D o'Connell 0-1.		D Molden 0-4, K Kenneally 0-2, M Cussen 0-1, J O'Callaghan 0-1, M Hopkins 0-1, A Barry 0-1.

27 June 2012 Second round	Aghabullogue	1-11 - 1-08	Cloyne	Páirc Uí Rinn
	John Corkery 0-8, E O'Sullivan 1-0, N Buckley 0-1, Jerome Corkery 0-1, B O'Keeffe 0-1.		D O'Sullivan 1-5, P O'Sullivan 0-1, C Smith 0-1, C O'Sullivan 0-1.

=== Third round ===
8 July 2012 Third round	Castletownbere	1-13 - 0-05	Glanmire	Kilmichael Grounds
	A O'Regan 1-5, D Fenton 0-4, D Murphy 0-2, D o'Sullivan 0-2.		D Molden 0-2, M Connolly 0-2, J O'Keeffe 0-1.

18 July 2012 Third round	Cloyne	3-10 - 1-08	Killavullen	Castlelyons] Grounds
	D O'Sullivan 3-3, C Smyth 0-3, C O'Sullivan 0-2, C O'Lomasney 0-1, P O'Sullivan 0-1.		A O'Driscoll 0-5, L Cronin 1-0, D Dorgan 0-1, P Egan 0-1, D Brosnan 0-1.

=== Relegation playoff ===
5 August 2012 Playoff	Glanmire	0-19 - 1-06	Killavullen	Páirc na Bríde
	A Barry 0-4, F Reilly 0-3, B O'Connell 0-3, D tsu 0-2, D Molden 0-2, M Cussen 0-1, M Connolly 0-1, B O'Callaghan 0-1, M Hopkins 0-1, K Kennealy 0-1.		P Egan 1-0, A O'Driscoll 0-2, B O'Driscoll 0-2, D Dorgan 0-1, M Dineen 0-1.

=== Fourth round ===
10 August 2012 Fourth round	Aghabullogue	0-05 - 1-14	Cill na Martra	Páirc Traolach Mac Suibhne
	John Corkery 0-2, S O'Sullivan 0-1, M O'Sullivan 0-1, E O'Sullivan 0-1.		D Ó Conaill 1-2, M Ó Conchúir 0-4, C Ó Súilleabháin 0-3, D Óg Ó Laoire 0-2, C Ó hUidhir 0-1, C Mac Suibhne 0-1, S Ó Duinnín 0-1.

18 August 2012 Fourth round	Grenagh	1-06 - 2-05	Castletownbere	Uíbh Laoire Grounds
	J Russell 1-3, D Dorgan 0-1, T Kenny 0-1, C Fitzgerald 0-1.		A O'Regan 1-4, G Healy 1-0, L Hanley 0-1.

1 September 2012 Fourth round	Fermoy	0-14 - 0-04	Cloyne	Páirc Lios gCúl
	R O'Hagan 0-5, A O'Connor 0-3, J Campion 0-2, P de Róiste 0-2, J Hutchings 0-1, R O'Callaghan 0-1.		C Smith 0-3, D O'Sullivan 0-1.

1 September 2012 Fourth round	Ballydesmond	1-17 - 0-13	Canovee	Clyda Rovers Grounds
	D o'Connor 0-7, P Breen 1-3, N Fleming 0-4, N O'Sullivan 0-1, J O'Keeffe 0-1, N O'Leary 0-1.		S O'Connor 0-4, D O'Sullivan 0-3, M Verling 0-3, P Dunlea 0-2, D Ring 0-1.

2 September 2012 Fourth round	Kildorrery	1-10 - 3-11	Éire Óg	Blarney Grounds
	P O’Brien 1-1, E O’Connor 0-3, T Monaghan (frees) and W Fouhy (0-1 free) 0-2 each, A O’Brien and D Kelly 0-1 each.	Report	J Dineen 1-3 (0-1 free), D Herlihy and K Hallissey 1-2 each, D Goulding 0-3 (0-1 free), A O’Mahony 0-1.

7 September 2012 Fourth round	Glanworth	2-11 - 2-09	Kanturk	Fr Con Buckley Park
	P O'Driscoll 2-3, G O'Neill 0-2, M Pierce 0-2, B Gallagher 0-1, M Sheehan 0-1, R O'Driscoll 0-1, D Pyne 0-1.		D Duane 1-1, K Holland 0-2, E O'Connor 0-2, A Walsh 0-2, M Healy 0-1, D O'Connor 0-1.

- Adrigole and Youghal received byes in this round.

=== Quarter-finals ===
18 August 2012 Quarter-final	Adrigole	1-11 - 2-08	Youghal	Canovee Grounds
	T O'Sullivan 1-2, K Jer O'Sullivan 0-2, B Jer O'Sullivan 0-2, K Goggin 0-2, K O'Sullivan 0-1, B Goggin 0-1, D Harrington 0-1.		J O'Mahony 1-2, P Kelly 1-0, J Ormonde 0-3, A Frahill-O'Connor 0-3.

7 September 2012 Quarter-final	Éire Óg	0-20 - 0-07	Ballydesmond	Mallow GAA Complex
	K Hallissey 0-9, D Goulding 0-5, J Dineen 0-2, C Sheehan 0-2, A O'Connor 0-1, D O'Herlihy 0-1.		D O'Connor 0-5, N Fleming 0-2.

8 September 2012 Quarter-final	Cill na Martra	1-11- 0-09	Fermoy	Blarney Grounds
	M Ó Duinnín 1-2, M Ó Conchúir 0-3, D Ó Conaill 0-2, C Ó Súilleabháin 0-2, S Ó Ceilleachair 0-1, C Ó hUidhir 0-1.		R O'Hagan 0-3, P de Faoite 0-2, J Campion 0-1, J Hutchins 0-1, T Clancy 0-1, R O'Callaghan 0-1.

8 September 2010 Quarter-final replay	Adrigole	0-13 - 1-07	Youghal	Canovee Grounds
	B O'Sullivan 0-5, K O'Sullivan 0-4, K Goggin 0-2, L Harrington 0-1, P O'Sullivan 0-1.		Barry Ring 1-0, Brendan Ring 0-3, A Frahill-O'Connor 0-3, B Goggin 0-1.

22 September 2012 Quarter-final	Castletownbere	1-13 - 1-10	Glanworth	Uíbh Laoire GAA Grounds
	S O'Regan 1-2, D Murphy 0-4, A O'Sullivan 0-3, A O'Regan 0-3, T Collins 0-1.		B Gallagher 1-2, P O'Driscoll 0-4, D Pyne 0-1, R O'Driscoll 0-1, C Quirke 0-1, M Sheehan 0-1.

=== Semi-finals ===
22 September 2012 Semi-final	Éire Óg	1-12 - 1-09	Cill na Martra	Coachford Sportsfield
	K Hallissey 1-4, J Dineen 0-4, D Goulding 0-2, C Sheehan 0-1, A O'Connor 0-1.		M Ó Duinnín 1-1, M Ó Conchúir 0-4, C Ó Súilleabháin 0-2, D Óg Ó Laoire 0-1, C Ó hUidhir 0-1.

29 September 2012 Semi-final	Castletownbere	0-12 - 0-06	Adrigole	Páirc Gairinis
	D Fenton 0-4, A O'Regan 0-2, D Murphy 0-2, S O'Regan 0-1, G Healy 0-1, T Collins 0-1, S Bán O'Sullivan 0-1.		K Goggin 0-2, B Jer O'Sullivan 0-2, D Harrington 0-1, L Harrington 0-1.

=== Final ===
14 October 2012 Final	Castletownbere	1-12 - 0-13	Éire Óg	Páirc Uí Rinn
	A O’Sullivan 1-2 (1-0pen, 1 45), A O’Regan 0-3 (1f), D Fenton 0-2, S O’Regan, D Murphy, J Walsh, C Murphy, L Hanley 0-1 each.	Report	D Goulding 0-7 (3fs, 1 45), K Hallissey 0-2, A O’Mahony, C Sheehan, J Dineen, A O’Connor 0-1 each.	Referee: K Murphy (Nemo Rangers)

== Championship statistics ==
=== Top scorers ===
Rank	Player	Club	Tally	Total	Matches	Average
1	Alan O'Regan	Castletownbere	2-24	30	7	7.00
2	Daniel Goulding	Éire Óg	1-22	25	5	5.00
3	Kevin Hallissey	Éire Óg	2-18	24	5	4.80
4	Diarmuid O'Sullivan	Cloyne	4-11	23	4	5.75
5	Donncha O'Connor	Ballydesmond	0-21	21	3	7.00
6	Pierre O'Driscoll	Glanworth	2-12	18	4	4.50
7	Daniel Molden	Glanmire	1-14	17	4	4.25
8	Kevin Goggin	Adrigole	0-16	16	5	3.20
8	Máirtín Ó Conchúir	Éire Óg	0-16	16	5	3.20
10	David Fenton	Castletownbere	0-15	15	7	2.14
