= 2020 Cork Intermediate A Football Championship =

- Dates: 24 July 2020 - 21 August 2021
- Teams: 16
- Sponsor: Bon Secours Hospital
- Champions: Rockchapel (2ndth title); Kevin Collins (captain); Jerry Casey (manager)
- Runners-up: Mitchelstown
- Relegated: Mayfield

Tournament statistics
- Matches played: 32
- Goals scored: 77 (2.41 per match)
- Points scored: 685 (21.41 per match)
- Top scorer(s): Cathail O'Mahony (5-29)

The 2020 Cork Intermediate A Football Championship was the 85th staging of the Cork Intermediate A Football Championship since its establishment by the Cork County Board in 1909. The draw for the group stage placings took place on 19 November 2019. The championship was scheduled to begin in April 2020, however, it was postponed indefinitely due to the 2020 coronavirus pandemic in Ireland. The championship eventually began on 24 July 2020, after being suspended once again on 5 October 2020, eventually ended on 21 August 2021.

The final was played on 21 August 2021 at Mallow GAA Complex, between Rockchapel and Mitchelstown, in what was their first meeting in the final. Rockchapel won the match by 1–10 to 0–09 to claim their second championship title overall and their first since 1989.

Mitchelstown's Cathail O'Mahony was the championship's top scorer with 5-29.

== Format change ==
On 26 March 2019, three championship proposals were circulated to Cork club delegates. A core element running through all three proposals, put together by the Cork GAA games workgroup, was that there be a group stage of 12 teams and straight relegation and promotion. On 2 April 2019, a majority of 136 club delegates voted for Option A which will see one round of games played in April and two more in August – all with county players available.

== Group 1 ==
=== Group 1 table ===
Advance to play-offs Advance to relegation play-offs

Team	Matches				Score			Pts
Team	Pld	W	D	L	For	Against	Diff	Pts
Millstreet	3	2	0	1	3-39	3-23	16	4
Ballinora	3	2	0	1	2-31	3-25	3	4
St. Finbarr's	3	1	0	2	2-32	3-43	-14	2
Glenville	3	1	0	2	6-29	4-40	-5	2

=== Group 1 results ===
25 July 2020 Round 1	Glenville	3-07 - 2-12	Ballinora	Grenagh
	A Murphy 2-2, S Desmond 1-2, J Gowen, C Cronin, J Cooke 0-1 each.	Report	N Lordan 0-4 (0-2 f), D Holmes 1-1 (1-0 penalty), J Lordan 0-3, A O’Shea 1-0, I Wycherley 0-2, B Murphy, C Lougheed 0-1 each.

26 July 2020 Round 1	Millstreet	2-18 - 1-07	St. Finbarr's	Carrigadrohid
	N Flahive (1-9); J Broxton (1-1); C O’Leary (0-3); P Moynihan, D Kiely (0-2 each); D Cashman (0-1).	Report	F O’Shea (0-4, 2 frees); S Cunningham (1-0); A Murphy, A Turner, C Madden (0-1 each).

15 August 2020 Round 2	Millstreet	0-08 - 0-05	Ballinora	Macroom
	S Hickey (0-2, frees), D Cashman, C O’Leary (0-2 each), P Moynihan, N Flahive (0-1 each).	Report	N Lordan (0-2, frees), B Ahern (free), L O’Donovan, D Corkery (0-1 each).	Referee: Eamonn Sheehy

16 August 2020 Round 2	St. Finbarr's	1-15 - 1-11	Glenville	Carrignavar
	R O’Mahony (0-5), A Turner (1-0) C Madden (0-3), E Finn (0-2), F O’Shea, P Kennedy, B O’Connell, C McCarthy, M Griffin (0-1 each)	Report	J Cooke (0-8), S Desmond (1-0), S Field (0-2), PJ Dennehy (0-1).	Referee: A Hyland

5 September 2020 Round 3	Millstreet	1-13 - 2-11	Glenville	Donoughmore
	N Flahive 0-5, P Moynihan 1-1, J Linehan 0-2, D Cashman 0-2, S Hickey 0-1, D Kiely 0-1, J Broxton 0-1.		S Field 1-1, PJ Dennehy 1-1, A Murphy 0-4, J Cooke 0-2, J Gowen 0-1, W Connolly 0-1, S Desmond 0-1.

5 September 2020 Round 3	St. Finbarr's	0-10 - 0-14	Ballinora	Ballincollig
	R O'Mahony 0-3, D Calnan 0-2, C McCarthy 0-1, J O'Brien 0-1, A Turner 0-1, E Keane 0-1, F O'Shea 0-1.		B Ahern 0-5, D Holmes 0-4, D Corkery 0-3, A O'Neill 0-1, I Wycherley 0-1.

== Group 2 ==
=== Group 2 table ===
Advance to play-offs Advance to relegation play-offs

Team	Matches				Score			Pts
Team	Pld	W	D	L	For	Against	Diff	Pts
Rockchapel	3	2	1	0	3-41	2-34	10	5
Kinsale	3	2	0	1	4-32	3-36	-1	4
Dromtariffe	3	1	1	1	4-34	4-29	5	3
Ballydesmond	3	0	0	3	1-30	3-38	-14	0

=== Group 2 results ===
26 July 2020 Round 1	Ballydesmond	0-09 - 1-12	Kinsale	O'Connell Park
	D O'Connor 0-5, N Fleming 0-2, B Fleming 0-1, R Flynn 0-1.		G Finn 0-5, H Sheehan 1-1, C Donnellan 0-2, T Broderick 0-2, A Gould 0-1, J O'Brien 0-1.

26 July 2020 Round 1	Rockchapel	2-08 - 0-14	Dromtariffe	O'Connor-McLoughlin Memorial Park
	J Curtin 2-4, J Walsh 0-2, J Forrest 0-1, S Hickey 0-1.		E Murphy 0-6, C O'Callaghan 0-5, B O'Keeffe 0-1, D O'Connor 0-1, M O'Connor 0-1.

15 August 2020 Round 2	Dromtariffe	2-10 - 0-09	Ballydesmond	Boherbue
	C O’Callaghan (1-6, 5f), E Murphy (1-2), A Buckley, M Healy (0-1 each).	Report	D O’Connor (0-4, 2 frees), N Fleming (0-4, 1 free), D Moynihan (0-1).

15 August 2020 Round 2	Rockchapel	1-17 - 1-08	Kinsale	Donoughmore
	M McAuliffe 1-3, J Curtin 0-4 (0-3f), J Forrest 0-3, S Hickey 0-3, W Murphy 0-2, J Walsh, N Lenihan 0-1 each.	Report	D Coughlan 1-1, G Finn 0-4f, C Donnellan, B Coughlan, B O’Neill 0-1 each.

5 September 2020 Round 3	Rockchapel	0-16 - 1-12	Ballydesmond	Kiskeam
	S Hickey 0-5, J Forrest 0-3, J Curtin 0-2, M McAuliffe 0-2, D O'Callaghan 0-1, N Linehan 0-1, L Collins 0-1, J Walsh 0-1.		D O'Connor 1-6, D Moynihan 0-2, N Fleming 0-1, R Flynn 0-1, S Cronin 0-1, J Healy 0-1.

5 September 2020 Round 3	Dromtariffe	2-10 - 2-12	Kinsale	Kilmurry
	E Murphy 1-5, C Coleman 1-0, C O'Callaghan 0-4, J Murphy 0-1.		G Finn 0-6, S O'Brien 1-0, H Sheehan 1-0, B Coughlan 0-3, N McCarthy 0-2, J O'Brien 0-1.

== Group 3 ==
=== Group 3 table ===
Advance to play-offs Advance to relegation play-offs

Team	Matches				Score			Pts
Team	Pld	W	D	L	For	Against	Diff	Pts
Mitchelstown	3	3	0	0	6-43	4-18	31	6
Glanworth	3	2	0	1	3-32	2-35	0	4
Adrigole	3	1	0	2	3-27	7-28	-14	2
Mayfield	3	0	0	3	4-23	3-42	-16	0

=== Group 3 results ===
25 July 2020 Round 1	Mayfield	2-08 - 2-11	Adrigole	Inchigeelagh
	D Lucey 0-3 (0-2 f), S Hackett 1-0 pen, R Lynch 1-0, N Kelly 0-2, D Malone, P Condon (f), S Duggan 0-1 each.	Report	K Goggin 1-3, 0-3 f, D Harrington 1-2, S O’Sullivan 0-2 (0-1 f), K O’Sullivan, J Harrington 0-2 each.	Referee: A Whelton (Clonakilty)

26 July 2020 Round 1	Mitchelstown	2-14 - 1-09	Glanworth	Mallow GAA Complex
	C O’Mahony (1-8, 6 frees); S Cahill (1-1), M Walsh (0-2, frees), A Walsh, D Reidy-Price, C English (0-1 each).	Report	D Colfer (1-0); M Sheehan (0-3); S Condon (0-2); E O’Donoghue (free), S O’Riordan, G O’Neill, D Connolly (0-1 each).

15 August 2020 Round 2	Mitchelstown	4-12 - 1-07	Adrigole	Carrigadrohid
	C O’Mahony (2-1), S O’Sullivan (2-0), J Cott (0-3), J Sheehan (0-3 frees), S Cahill (0-2, 1 free), P Magee, S Walsh, D Flynn (0-1 each).	Report	K Goggin (1-2, 2 frees), S O’Sullivan (0-3, 0-1 free), C O’Neill, R O’Sullivan (0-1 each), A Jer O’Sullivan (0-1 free).	Referee: James Regan

16 August 2020 Round 2	Glanworth	1-14 - 0-12	Mayfield	Blarney
	S O’Riordan 0-7 (0-3 f), M Sheehan 0-4, S Condon 1-0, E O’Donoghue, P Blackburn and R Murphy 0-1 each.	Report	P Condon 0-8 (0-6 f), C O’Neill, J Sheehy, D Malone and D Lucey 0-1 each.	Referee: Michael Walsh

5 September 2020 Round 3	Mitchelstown	0-17 - 2-03	Mayfield	Páirc Mac Gearailt
	C O'Mahony 0-6, J Sheehan 0-3, P Magee 0-2, S Beston 0-1, A O'Brien 0-1, D Flynn 0-1, S Cahill 0-1, M Walsh 0-1, S O'Sullivan 0-1.		M Barry 1-0, D O'Neill 1-0, D Lucey 0-2, K Punch 0-1.

5 September 2020 Round 3	Glanworth	1-09 - 0-09	Adrigole	Ovens
	S O'Riordan 0-5, S Condon 1-0, D Pyne 0-2, M Sheehan 0-1, G O'Neill 0-1.		K Goggin 0-2, D Harrington 0-2, S O'Sullivan 0-2, R O'Sullivan 0-1, K O'Sullivan 0-1, N O'Sullivan 0-1.

== Group 4 ==
=== Group 4 table ===
Advance to play-offs Advance to relegation play-offs

Team	Matches				Score			Pts
Team	Pld	W	D	L	For	Against	Diff	Pts
Kilshannig	3	3	0	0	6-42	2-32	22	6
Aghabullogue	3	2	0	1	4-24	3-21	6	4
Kildorrery	3	1	0	2	5-29	8-29	-9	2
Glanmire	3	0	0	3	3-27	5-40	-19	0

=== Group 4 results ===
24 July 2020 Round 1	Glanmire	0-14 - 2-18	Kilshannig	Blarney Sportsfield
	D Molden (0-4f), J Murphy 0-4 each, S O’Driscoll 0-2, W Jones, T Lonergan, D McCarthy, C Shine 0-1 each.	Report	É O’Hanlon (0-2f), D O’Sullivan 0-4 each, K O’Hanlon, J Twomey 1-1 each, C McMahon 0-3, B O’Shea, K Twomey (0-1f) 0-2 each, J Kearney 0-1.

24 July 2020 Round 1	Aghabullogue	2-07 - 2-06	Kildorrery	Mallow GAA Complex
	D Thompson (1-3 frees); I Barry-Murphy (1-1); S O’Connell, E O’Sullivan, L Casey (free) (0-1 each).	Report	T Monaghan, J O’Sullivan (1-0 each); P O’Brien (0-2, 1 free); F Stapleton, Jamie O’Gorman, K Hurley, R McEniry (0-1 each).

16 August 2020 Round 2	Aghabullogue	0-07 - 0-10	Kilshannig	Cullen
	L Casey (0-3, 2 frees, 1 45), D Thompson (0-1 free); P O’Sullivan, S O’Connell and M Bradley (0-1 each.	Report	E O’Hanlon (0-4, 3 frees, 1 45), K Twomey (0-3, 2 frees), S Murphy, B O’Shea, J Kearney and D O’Sullivan (0-1 each).	Referee: Teddy O'Donovan

16 August 2020 Round 2	Kildorrery	1-12 - 2-08	Glanmire	Rathcormac
	D McNamara (1-0), A O’Brien (0-3, 2 frees); S O’Neill (0-2, 1 free); J O’Gorman (0-2); P O’Brien (free), J O’Sullivan, D Kent, D Kelly, T Monaghan (0-1 each).	Report	D Molden (0-4 frees); T Leahy (1-0); K Kenneally (1-0); D McCarthy (0-2), C Murray, C Crowley (0-1 each).	Referee: Cathal Egan

5 September 2020 Round 3	Aghabullogue	2-10 - 1-05	Glanmire	Blarney Sportsfield
	E O'Sullivan 1-6, M Bradley 1-2, L Casey 0-2.		S O'Driscoll 1-0, J Murphy 0-3, Daniel Molden 0-1, T Lonergan 0-1.

5 September 2020 Round 3	Kildorrery	2-11 - 4-14	Kilshannig	Mallow GAA Complex
	T Monaghan 1-3; S O’Neill 0-4 (all frees); A O’Brien 1-0; S Fitzgerald 0-2; PJ Keating, D Kelly 0-1 each.	Report	E O’Sullivan 2-1; E O’Hanlon 1-3 (one free); K Twomey 0-5 (0-3f); D O’Sullivan 1-0; B O’Shea 0-2, J Kearney, K O’Hanlon (one free), J Twomey 0-1 each.

== Knockout stage ==
=== Relegation playoff ===
18 September 2020 Playoff	Glanmire	0-14 - 1-05	Mayfield	Páirc Uí Chonaire
	D Molden 0-5 (0-3f); J Murphy 0-4 (0-1f); C Shine, C Crowley, C Murray, B Lagrue, K Kenneally (0-1 each).	Report	P Condon 0-4 (0-2f), D Malone 1-0, D O’Neill 0-1.

=== Quarter-finals ===
19 September 2020 Quarter-final	Mitchelstown	3-20 - 2-10	Kinsale	Páirc Shéamuis de Barra
	C O’Mahony (0-8, 3 frees), A O’Brien (2-0), S O’Sullivan (1-0), M Walsh and J Sheehan (0-3, 1 frees) each, D Flynn (0-2), P Molloy, S Walsh, C English and S Cahill (0-1 each).	Report	T Broderick (1-2, 1 free), G Finn (1-4, 1-0 pen, 3 frees), H Sheehan (0-2), B Coughlan and D O’Mahony (0-1 each).

19 September 2020 Quarter-final	Kilshannig	1-12 - 1-13	Glanworth	The Mill Field
	K O'Hanlon 1-3 (0-1 f), K Twomey 0-5 (0-4 f), D O'Sullivan, J Kearney, G Kennefick, B O'Shea 0-1 each.	Report	S O'Riordan 0-8 (0-3 f, 0- 1 45), S Finn 1-0, M Sheehan 0-2, R Murphy, P O'Driscoll, R O'Driscoll 0-1 each.

19 September 2020 Quarter-final	Rockchapel	2-14 - 1-11	Ballinora	Mallow GAA Complex
	J Curtin (1-6, 3 frees); S Hickey (1-4); C Curtin, J Walsh, W Murphy, N Linehan (0-1 each).	Report	D Corkery (1-1, 1 free); B Ahearn (2 frees), I Wycherley (0-2 each); G Forde, A O’Shea, N Lordan, L O’Donovan, A O’Neill, D Holmes (0-1 each).

19 September 2020 Quarter-final	Millstreet	0-09 - 2-15	Aghabullogue	Páirc Abán
	S Hickey (0-5, 2 frees), D Cashman, N Flahive, J Linehan, D Kiely (0-1 each).	Report	L Casey (1-6, 2 frees), E O’Sullivan (0-6, 1 free), M Bradley (0-4, 1 free), P O’Sullivan (1-0), S O’Connell (0-1).

=== Semi-finals ===
3 October 2020 Semi-final	Glanworth	1-07 - 1-13	Rockchapel	Dromina Sportsfield
	S Condon 1-0, S O’Riordan 0-5 (5f), P Hannon, G O’Neill 0-1 each.	Report	J Curtin 1-5 (4f), M McAuliffe 0-2, K Collins, S Hickey, M O’Keeffe, L Collins, J O’Callaghan, C Curtin 0-1 each.

4 October 2020 Semi-final	Mitchelstown	2-13 - 0-07	Aghabullogue	Mallow GAA Complex
	C O’Mahony 2-5 (0-3 f), S Cahill, M Walsh (0-1 f) 0-2 each, S Walsh, P Magee, S O’Sullivan, S Coleman 0-1 each.	Report	L Casey 0-4 (0-3 f, 0-1 45), M Bradley 0-2, E O’Sullivan 0-1 f.	Referee: C Dineen (Douglas)

=== Final ===
21 August 2021 Final	Rockchapel	1-10 - 0-09	Mitchelstown	Mallow GAA Complex
	J Curtin 0-4, K Collins 1-0, J O’Callaghan 0- 3, M McAulliffe 0-2, N O’Callaghan 0-1 each.	Report	M Walsh 0-2 f, P Magee 0-2, J Sheehan (f), S Cahill, D Flynn, J O’Sullivan, C O’Mahony (f) 0-1 each.	Referee: M Collins (CLonakilty)

== Championship statistics ==
=== Top scorers ===
Overall

Rank	Player	Club	Tally	Total	Matches	Average
1	Cathail O'Mahony	Mitchelstown	5-29	44	6	7.33
2	Jack Curtin	Rockchapel	4-25	37	6	6.16
3	Shane O'Riordan	Glanworth	0-26	26	5	5.20
4	Evan O'Sullivan	Aghabullogue	3-15	24	5	4.80
5	Gearóid Finn	Kinsale	1-19	22	4	5.50
6	Evan Murphy	Dromtarriffe	2-13	19	3	6.33
6	Luke Casey	Aghabullogue	1-16	19	5	3.80
6	Neil Flahive	Millstreet	1-16	19	4	4.75
9	Conor O'Callaghan	Dromtarriffe	1-15	18	3	6.00
9	Donncha O'Connor	Ballydesmond	1-15	18	3	6.00

In a single game

Rank	Player	Club	Tally	Total	Opposition
1	Neil Flahive	Millstreet	1-09	12	St. Finbarr's
2	Cathail O'Mahony	Mitchelstown	2-05	11	Aghabullogue
2	Cathail O'Mahony	Mitchelstown	1-08	11	Glanworth
4	Jack Curtin	Rockchapel	2-04	10	Dromtarriffe
5	Jack Curtin	Rockchapel	1-06	9	Ballinora
5	Conor O'Callaghan	Dromtarriffe	1-06	9	Ballydesmond
5	Luke Casey	Aghabullogue	1-06	9	Millstreet
5	Donncha O'Connor	Ballydesmond	1-06	9	Rockchapel
5	Evan O'Sullivan	Aghabullogue	1-06	9	Glanmire
10	Adam Murphy	Glenville	2-02	8	Ballinora
10	Evan Murphy	Dromtarriffe	1-05	8	Kinsale
10	Jack Curtin	Rockchapel	1-05	8	Glanworth
10	Cathail O'Mahony	Mitchelstown	0-08	8	Kinsale
10	Josh Cooke	Glenville	0-08	8	St. Finbarr's
10	Paul Condon	Mayfield	0-08	8	Glanworth
10	Shane O'Riordan	Glanworth	0-08	8	Kilshannig
