= 1985 Cork Junior A Football Championship =

- Dates: 29 September – 24 November 1985
- Teams: 8
- Champions: Kilshannig (1st title); Pat O'Regan (captain); John O'Mahony (manager)
- Runners-up: Valley Rovers; Liam Crowley (captain); Paudie Palmer (manager); Dee Fitzgerald (manager)

Tournament statistics
- Matches played: 8
- Goals scored: 14 (1.75 per match)
- Points scored: 108 (13.5 per match)
- Top scorer(s): P. J. Hurley (2–08)

The 1985 Cork Junior A Football Championship was the 87th staging of the Cork Junior A Football Championship since its establishment by Cork County Board in 1895. The championship ran from 29 September to 24 November 1985.

The final replay was played on 24 November 1985 at Páirc Uí Chaoimh in Cork, between Kilshannig and Valley Rovers, in what was their first ever meeting in the final. Kilshannig won the match by 2–06 to 2–04 to claim their first ever championship title.

P. J. Hurley was the championship's top scorer with 2–08.

== Qualification ==
Division	Championship	Champions
Avondhu	North Cork Junior A Football Championship	Kilshannig
Beara	Beara Junior A Football Championship	Bere Island
Carbery	South West Junior A Football Championship	Bantry Blues
Carrigdhoun	South East Junior A Football Championship	Valley Rovers
Duhallow	Duhallow Junior A Football Championship	Rockchapel
Imokilly	East Cork Junior A Football Championship	Castlemartyr
Muskerry	Mid Cork Junior A Football Championship	Iveleary
Seandún	City Junior A Football Championship	St. Nicholas'

== Results ==
=== Quarter-finals ===
29 September 1985 Quarter-final	Valley Rovers	4–10 – 0–07	Rockchapel	Kilmichael Grounds
	PJ Hurley 1–3, C O'Donovan 1–2, G Slyne 1–0, D O'Sullivan 1–0, G Crowley 0–2, D O'Donovan 0–1, A Crowley 0–1, J O'Donovan 0–1.		Joe Casey 0–4, Jerry Casey 0–1, D O'Mahony 0–1, J Murphy 0–1.

6 October 1985 Quarter-final	Kilshannig	0–15 – 1–05	Bere Island	Ballingeary Grounds
	J O'Donoghue 0–5, W O'Riordan 0–4, P Murphy 0–2, D O'Connell 0–2, N Finnegan 0–1, P O'Connell 0–1.		D O'Brien 1–4, D Murphy 0–1.

27 October 1985 Quarter-final	Bantry Blues	1–08 – 0–10	St. Nicholas'	Innishannon Grounds
	D Hunt 1–4, L O'Brien 0–2, D Barron 0–1, D Dineen 0–1.		D Whitley 0–3, N Murphy 0–2, C Marshall 0–1, P Long 0–1, L Hedderman 0–1, N Hedderman 0–1, R Murphy 0–1.

27 October 1985 Quarter-final	Castlemartyr	0–09 – 0–05	Iveleary	Blarney Grounds
	J Cosgrave 0–3, K Murphy 0–3, P Walsh 0–1, C O'Sullivan 0–1, S Leahy 0–1.		P Creedon 0–2, C O'Callaghan 0–2, E Hackett 0–1.

=== Semi-finals ===
3 November 1985 Semi-final	Kilshannig	0–10 – 1–04	Castlemartyr	Páirc Mac Gearailt
	W O'Riordan 0–3, J O'Donoghue 0–2, D O'Connell 0–2, P O'Connell 0–1, P Murphy 0–1, L O'Callaghan 0–1.		M Duggan 1–0, B Lawton 0–1, C O'Sullivan 0–1, K Murphy 0–1, F Murphy 0–1.

10 November 1985 Semi-final	Valley Rovers	2–07 – 0–05	Bantry Blues	Sam Maguire Park
	G Crowley 1–1, PJ Hurley 1–0, G Slyne 0–3, D O'Sullivan 0–2, TJ Deasy 0–1.		D Barron 0–4, M Kelly 0–1.

=== Final ===
17 November 1985 Final	Kilshannig	1–07 – 0–10	Valley Rovers	Pairc Ui Chaoimh
	N Finnegan 1–1, J O'Donoghue 0–2, W O'Riordan 0–2, D O'Connell 0–2.		PJ Hurley 0–3, A Crowley 0–2, C O'Donovan 0–2, J Bernard 0–1, G Slyne 0–1, P O'Sullivan 0–1.

24 November 1985 Final replay	Kilshannig	2–06 – 2–04	Valley Rovers	Pairc Ui Chaoimh
	P Murphy 1–0, N Finnegan 1–0, J O'Donoghue 0–3, P O'Connell 0–2, W O'Riordan 0–1.		P O'Sullivan 1–1, F Crowley 1–0, PJ Hurley 0–2, B O'Sullivan 0–1.

== Championship statistics ==
=== Top scorers ===
Overall

Rank	Player	Club	Tally	Total	Matches	Average
1	P. J. Hurley	Valley Rovers	2–08	14	4	3.50
2	Johnny O'Donoghue	Kilshannig	0–12	12	4	3.00
3	William O'Riordan	Kilshannig	0–10	10	4	2.50
4	Noelie Finnegan	Kilshannig	2–02	8	4	2.00
5	Chris O'Donovan	Valley Rovers	1–04	7	2	3.50
5	Donie O'Brien	Bere Island	1–04	7	1	7.00
5	Donal Hunt	Bantry Blues	1–04	7	2	3.50
5	Gerard Slyne	Valley Rovers	1–04	7	4	1.75

In a single game

Rank	Player	Club	Tally	Total	Opposition
1	Donal Hunt	Bantry Blues	1–04	7	St. Nicholas'
1	Donie O'Brien	Bere Island	1–04	7	Kilshannig
3	P. J. Hurley	Valley Rovers	1–03	6	Rockchapel
4	Chris O'Donovan	Valley Rovers	1–02	5	Rockchapel
4	Johnny O'Donoghue	Kilshannig	0-05	5	Bere Island
6	Gerard Crowley	Valley Rovers	1–01	4	Bantry Blues
6	Noelie Finnegan	Kilshannig	1–01	4	Valley Rovers
6	Pádraig O'Sullivan	Valley Rovers	1–01	4	Kilshannig
6	Joe Casey	Rockchapel	0–04	4	Valley Rovers
6	William O'Riordan	Kilshannig	0–04	4	Bere Island
6	Declan Barron	Bantry Blues	0–04	4	Valley Rovers
