= Anthony Casey =

Irish Gaelic footballer

Personal information
- Native name: Antaine Ó Cathasaigh (Irish)
- Born: 1995 (age 30–31) Kiskeam, County Cork, Ireland

Sport
- Sport: Gaelic Football
- Position: Goalkeeper
Club
- Years: Club
- Kiskeam
Club titles
- Cork titles: 0
College
- Years: College
- Cork Institute of Technology
College titles
- Sigerson titles: 0
Inter-county
Years	County	Apps (scores)
2018-present	Cork	0 (0-00)
Inter-county titles
- Munster titles: 0
- All-Irelands: 0
- NFL: 0
- All Stars: 0

Anthony Casey (born 1995) is an Irish Gaelic footballer who plays for Cork Senior Championship club Kiskeam and at inter-county level with the Cork senior football team. He usually lines out as a goalkeeper.

== Honours ==
Kiskeam

- Cork Premier Intermediate Football Championship (1): 2016

Cork

- National Football League Division 3 (1): 2020
- Munster Under-21 Football Championship (1): 2016
