= Alan O'Regan =

Irish Gaelic footballer

Personal information
- Native name: Ailéin Ó Riagáin (Irish)
- Born: 1976 Castletownbere, County Cork, Ireland

Sport
- Sport: Gaelic football
- Position: Right corner-forward
Clubs
- Years: Club
- Castletownbere → Beara
Club titles
- Cork titles: 1
College
- Years: College
- Waterford RTC
College titles
- Sigerson titles: 0
Inter-county
Years	County	Apps (scores)
1998-2004	Cork	3 (2-01)
Inter-county titles
- Munster titles: 1
- All-Irelands: 0
- NFL: 1
- All Stars: 0

Alan O'Regan (born 1976) is an Irish Gaelic football coach and former player. At club level, he played with Castletownbere, divisional side Beara and at inter-county level with the Cork senior football team.

== Playing career ==
O'Regan played Gaelic football as a student at Beara Community School. He was part of the school team that beat Davitt College by 2-06 to 0-08 to win the All-Ireland Vocational Schools' SAFC title in 1994. O'Regan also earned selection to the Cork inter-county vocational schools' team and won an All-Ireland Vocational School's SFC after a 0-13 to 0-07 win over Donegal in 1994. He later studied at Waterford Regional Technical College and lined out in the Sigerson Cup.

At club level, O'Regan began his career at juvenile and underage levels with Castletownbere before progressing to adult level. He also earned selection to the Beara divisional team and was at centre-forward when they beat Castlehaven by 1-10 to 1-07 to win the Cork SFC title in 1997. O'Regan added a Cork IFC medal to his collection in 2012, after captaining Castletownbere to a win over Éire Óg in the final.

At inter-county level, O'Regan first appeared for Cork as a member of the minor team that won the All-Ireland MFC title in 1993, after a 2-07 to 0-09 win over Meath in the final. He later spent two seasons with the under-21 team but ended his tenure in that grade without silverware.

O'Regan made his senior team debut in 1998 and was later part of the team that won the National League title in 1999 after a defeat of Dublin in the league final. He added a Munster SFC medal to his collection later that season, however, he was subsequently injured in a car crash and missed Cork's defeat by Meath in the 1999 All-Ireland final.

== Coaching career ==
O'Regan served as a selector with the Castletownbere intermediate team in 2023. He became coach of the Cill na Martra senior team in 2024.

== Honours ==
Beara Community School

- All-Ireland Vocational Schools Senior A Football Championship: 1994
- Munster Vocational Schools Senior A Football Championship: 1994
- Cork Vocational Schools Senior A Football Championship: 1994

Castletownbere

- Cork Intermediate Football Championship: 2012

Beara

- Cork Senior Football Championship: 1997

Cork

- National Football League: 1998–99
- Munster Senior Football Championship: 1999
- All-Ireland Minor Football Championship: 1993
- Munster Minor Football Championship: 1993
