= 2016 Cork Premier Intermediate Football Championship =

British sporting competition

- Dates: 23 April 2016 – 23 October 2016
- Teams: 16
- Sponsor: Evening Echo
- Champions: Kiskeam (1st title); A. J. O'Connor (captain); John Angland (manager); Denis Reen (manager)
- Runners-up: Fermoy

Tournament statistics
- Matches played: 30
- Top scorer(s): Daniel Goulding (1-36)

The 2016 Cork Premier Intermediate Football Championship was the 11th staging of the Cork Premier Intermediate Football Championship since its establishment by the Cork County Board in 2006. The championship began on 23 April 2016 and ended on 23 October 2016.

On 23 October 2016, Kiskeam won the championship following a 2-12 to 0-14 defeat of Fermoy in the final at Páirc Uí Rinn. It was their first ever championship title.

Éire Óg's Daniel Goulding was the championship's top scorer with 1-36.

== Results ==
=== Round 1 ===
23 April 2016 Round 1	Macroom	0-08 - 1-07	Fermoy	Erin's Own Grounds
	F Goold 0-4, D Goold 0-2, K Murphy 0-1, S Kiely 0-1.		R O'Hagan 1-6, R O'Callaghan 0-1.

1 May 2016 Round 1	Ballinora	2-11 - 0-07	Grenagh	Blarney
	M Murphy 1-2, A O'Shea 1-1, D Holmes 0-3, B Ahern 0-2, A O'Neill 0-1, J Lordan 0-1, D Hegarty 0-1.		DD Dorgan 0-3, T Walsh 0-2, P McCarthy 0-1, U Duggan 0-1.

1 May 2016 Round 1	Béal Átha'n Ghaorthaidh	3-15 - 1-09	Newmarket	Castle Grounds
	C Ó Duinnín 2-1, D Mac Thomáis 1-3, T Ó Laoghaire 0-4, B Seartan 0-3, C Ó Loingsigh 0-1, A Ó Coinceannáin 0-1, L Ó Críodáin 0-1, C Ó Tuama 0-1.		D Culloty 0-6, C O'Keeffe 1-0, K O'Sullivan 0-1, T Murphy 0-1, J Ryan 0-1.

1 May 2016 Round 1	St. Michael's	1-08 - 0-05	St. Vincent's	Páirc Uí Rinn
	E Buckley 1-1, L O'Sullivan 0-3, M Mulconroy 0-1, E O'Sullivan 0-1, P Deasy 0-1, E Hegarty 0-1.		JP Murphy 0-2, G McCarthy 0-1, D Duggan 0-1, C Barry 0-1.

4 May 2016 Round 1	Éire Óg	0-16 - 1-06	Nemo Rangers	Páirc Uí Rinn
	D Goulding 0-10, J Dineen 0-3, K Hallissey 0-1, L Sheehan 0-1, F O'Rourke 0-1.		P Gumley 1-2, S Martin 0-1, K O'Donovan 0-1, D Kearney 0-1, C Allen 0-1.

6 May 2016 Round 1	Mallow	1-13 - 0-10	Bantry Blues	Páirc Naomh Eoin
	C O'Riordan 0-7, M O'Rourke 1-0, K O'Connor 0-2, P Herlihy 0-2, R Harkin 0-1, K Sheehan 0-1.		A Coakley 0-6, R Deane 0-2, S O'Leary 0-1, D Power 0-1.

8 May 2016 Round 1	Na Piarsaigh	2-13 - 0-12	Kiskeam	Banteer GAA Grounds
	A Keating 2-5, P Gould 0-3, A Hogan 0-1, K Buckley 0-1, S Warren 0-1, C O'Mahony 0-1, G Joyce 0-1.		S O'Sullivan 0-7, T O'Sullivan 0-2, M Casey 0-1, A Carroll 0-1, M Herlihy 0-1.

14 May 2016 Round 1	Castletownbere	0-08 - 1-11	Naomh Abán	Wolfe Tone Park
	D Murphy 0-4, D Fenton 0-2, G Murphy 0-1, A O'Sullivan 0-1.		M Ó Cróinín 1-3, S Mac Cárthaigh 0-3, D Ó Ceocháin 0-3, D Ó Ceallaigh 0-1, C Ó Murchú 0-1.

=== Round 2A ===
11 June 2016 Round 2A	Naomh Abán	0-03 - 0-13	Na Piarsaigh	Carrigadrohid
	M Ó Cróinín 0-1, S Mac Cárthaigh 0-1, C de hÍde 0-1.		C O'Mahony 0-3, K Buckley 0-3, A Keating 0-3, S Warren 0-2, D Lee 0-1, P Gould 0-1.

15 June 2016 Round 2A	Éire Óg	0-12 - 0-06	St. Michael's	Páirc Uí Rinn
	D Goulding 0-4, L Sheehan 0-2, A O'Connor 0-2, J Dineen 0-2, K Hallissey 0-1, D O'Connell 0-1.		A Murphy 0-2, E Buckley 0-2, P Cronin 0-2.

17 June 2016 Round 2A	Mallow	0-14 - 1-14	Béal Átha'n Ghaorthaidh	Coachford Sportsfield
	C O'Riordan 0-8, K O'Connor 0-4, C Stanton 0-1, J Loughrey 0-1.		A Ó Coinceannáin 0-4, C Ó Longsigh 1-0, L Seartan 0-3, B Seartan 0-2, T Ó Laoire 0-1, É Ó Duinnín 0-1, A Ó Loingsigh 0-1, C Ó Duinnín 0-1, N Ó Laoire 0-1.

6 August 2016 Round 2A	Fermoy	2-12 - 0-06	Ballinora	Mayfield
	A O'Connor 1-3, M Brennan 1-2, R O'Hagan 0-4, B O'Sullivan 0-1, T Clancy 0-1, O Carroll 0-1.		I Wycherley 0-3, D Holmes 0-2, M Murphy 0-1.

=== Round 2B ===
10 June 2016 Round 2B	Nemo Rangers	2-11 - 0-09	St. Vincent's	Ballinlough
	S O'Brien 1-2, K O'Donovan 1-1, S Martin 0-2, C Allen 0-2, D Kearney 0-2, K Weldon 0-1, P Gurnley 0-1.		JP Murphy 0-4, P O'Sullivan 0-2, C Barry 0-1, S Cunningham 0-1, S Buckley 0-1.

17 June 2016 Round 2B	Bantry Blues	1-16 - 1-14 (aet)	Newmarket	Cill na Martra
	R Deane 1-4, S Drummey 0-5, A Coakley 0-4, D Daly 0-1, S McCarthy 0-1, S O'Leary 0-1.		D Culloty 0-6, B O'Connor 1-1, C O'Keeffe 0-3, G Forde 0-1, A Browne 0-1, T O'Keeffe 0-1, J Ryan 0-1.

17 June 2016 Round 2B	Macroom	1-12 - 0-06	Grenagh	Blarney
	B O'Gorman 0-6, D Creedon 1-0, D Goold 0-2, F Goold 0-2, G Angland 0-1, D Horgan 0-1.		U Duggan 0-2, G Russell 0-1, DD Dorgan 0-1, N Doherty 0-1, B O'Neill 0-1.

25 June 2016 Round 2B	Castletownbere	0-06 - 1-19	Kiskeam	Ballingeary
	D Murphy 0-3, L Hanley 0-1, D Fenton 0-1, G Murphy 0-1.		M Herlihy 1-3, T O'Sullivan 0-4, D Scannell 0-3, G Casey 0-3, AJ O'Connor 0-1, Diarmuid Fitzgerald 0-1, P O'Leary 0-1, A Carroll 0-1, Daniel Fitzgerald 0-1, R Carroll 0-1.

=== Relegation playoffs ===
28 August 2016 Playoff	Castletownbere	0-11 - 0-07	St. Vincent's	Ballingeary
	A O'Sullivan 0-3, D Fenton 0-3, G Murphy 0-2, D Murphy 0-1, D O'Sullivan 0-1, L Harrington 0-1.		JP Murphy 0-3, D Duggan 0-2, K Lynch 0-2,

30 September 2016 Playoff	Grenagh	0-09 - 0-12	Newmarket	Páirc Nóra Ní Iarlaithe
	D Dorgan 0-7, K O'Neill 0-1, U Duggan 0-1.		D Culloty 0-3, C O'Keeffe 0-3, B O'Connor 0-2, B Daly 0-1, K O'Sullivan 0-1, B O'Riordan 0-1, A Ryan 0-1.

=== Round 3 ===
24 July 2016 Round 3	Macroom	1-12 - 0-11	St. Michael's	Coachford Sportsfield
	J Murphy 1-0, F Goold 0-3, D Goold 0-3, B O'Gorman 0-2, D Horgan 0-1, P Lucey 0-1, T Dineen 0-1, A Hegarty 0-1.		P Cronin 0-5, E Hegarty 0-3, E Buckley 0-1, S Keating 0-1, M Mulconroy 0-1.

24 July 2016 Round 3	Kiskeam	2-15 - 3-10	Mallow	Kanturk
	M Herlihy 1-3, D Scannell 1-3, T O'Sullivan 0-4, AJ O'Connor 0-2, A Carroll 0-1, M Casey 0-1, S O'Sullivan 0-1.		C O'Riordan 1-4, K O'Sullivan 1-2, M O'Rourke 1-0, P Herlihy 0-3, J Loughrey 0-1.

24 July 2016 Round 3	Naomh Abán	2-13 - 1-12	Nemo Rangers	Kilmichael
	D Ó Ceocháin 1-2, N Ó Ceallaigh 1-0, M Ó Cróinín 0-3, A Ó Loingsigh 0-3, D Ó Ceallaigh 0-3, M Ó Duinnín 0-2.		B O'Driscoll 0-5, A O'Donovan 1-0, D Kearney 0-3, P Gurnley 0-2, S O'Brien 0-1, A Morgan 0-1.

13 August 2016 Round 3	Ballinora	0-05 - 1-15	Bantry Blues	Ballyvourney
	D Holmes 0-3, M Murphy 0-2.		A Coakley 1-6, S Drummey 0-3, R Deane 0-2, G Johnson 0-2, S Coughlan 0-1, D Daly 0-1.

=== Quarter-finals ===
20 August 2016 Quarter-final	Kiskeam	2-13 - 2-07	Na Piarsaigh	Banteer GAA Grounds
	D Scannell 0-5, M Herlihy 1-1, G Casey 0-4, T Dennehy 1-0, T O'Sullivan 0-1, A Carroll 0-1, M Casey 0-1.		A Keating 1-2, S Warren 1-0, K Buckley 0-3, P Gould 0-1, P Rourke 0-1.

20 August 2016 Quarter-final	Béal Átha'n Ghaorthaidh	1-08 - 0-07	Macroom	Inchigeelagh
	A Ó Coinceannáin 1-4, L Ó Conchúir 0-2, C Ó Loingsigh 0-1, L Seartan 0-1.		D Goold 0-3, T Dineen 0-1, M Cronin 0-1, A Hegarty 0-1, F Goold 0-1.

27 August 2016 Quarter-final	Fermoy	3-13 - 1-14	Naomh Abán	Jack Fitzgerald Memorial Park
	P de Róiste 1-2, M Brennan 1-2, R O'Callaghan 1-2, R O'Hagan 0-5, A O'Connor 0-1, K Morrison 0-1.		M Ó Cróinín 0-7, D Ó Ceallaigh 1-3, M Ó Duinnín 0-2, C Ó Murchú 0-1, M Ó Laoire 0-1.

3 September 2016 Quarter-final	Bantry Blues	1-10 - 0-13	Éire Óg	Castle Grounds
	A Coakley 1-3, R Deane 0-3, G Johnson 0-1, K Casey 0-1, S O'Leary 0-1, G O'Shea 0-1.		D Goulding 0-5, J Dineen 0-3, K Hallissey 0-2, R O'Toole 0-1, D O'Herlihy 0-1, L Sheehan 0-1.

10 September 2016 Quarter-final replay	Bantry Blues	1-15 - 1-16 (aet)	Éire Óg	Castle Grounds
	R Deane 1-5, T Foley 0-3, A Coakley 0-3, G Johnson 0-2, S O'Neill 0-1, T Casey 0-1.		D Goulding 1-12, K Hallissey 0-2, D O'Connor 0-1, E O'Shea 0-1.

=== Semi-finals ===
10 September 2016 Semi-final	Kiskeam	1-12 - 0-14	Béal Átha'n Ghaorthaidh	Carrigadrohid
	S O'Sullivan 1-1, D Scannell 0-3, M Herlihy 0-3, G Casey 0-2, M Casey 0-1, A Carroll 0-1, D Fitzgerald 0-1.		A Ó Coinceannáin 0-5, L Seartan 0-4, L Ó Conchúir 0-1, C Ó Duinnín 0-1, A Ó Loingsigh 0-1, C Ó Loingsigh 0-1, T Ó Laoire 0-1.

17 September 2016 Semi-final	Éire Óg	0-09 - 4-10	Fermoy	Ballinlough
	D Goulding 0-5, L Sheehan 0-2, K Hallissey 0-1, S Fogarty 0-1.		R O'Callaghan 1-3, P Clancy 1-1, T Clancy 1-0, K Morrison 1-0, R O'Hagan 0-3, P de Róiste 0-1, J Hutchings 0-1, A O'Connor 0-1.

=== Final ===
23 October 2016 Final	Kiskeam	2-12 - 0-14	Fermoy	Páirc Uí Rinn
	D Scannell 1-4 (1f), T Dennehy 1-0, G Casey 0-3, T O'Sullivan 0-2, M Casey, M Herlihy and AJ O'Connor 0-1 each	Report	R O'Hagan 0-7 (6f), R O'Callaghan 0-3, L Coleman 0-2 (1f, 1'45), A O'Connor and T Clancy 0-1 each	Referee: M Collins (Clonakilty)

== Championship statistics ==
=== Top scorers ===
Overall

Rank	Player	Club	Tally	Total	Matches	Average
1	Daniel Goulding	Éire Óg	1-36	39	5	7.80
2	Arthur Coakley	Bantry Blues	2-22	28	5	5.60
2	Ruairí O'Hagan	Fermoy	1-25	28	5	5.60
3	David Scannell	Kiskeam	2-18	24	6	4.00
4	Ruairí Deane	Bantry Blues	2-16	22	5	4.40
4	Cian O'Riordan	Mallow	1-19	22	3	7.33
5	Michael Herlihy	Kiskeam	3-12	21	6	3.50
6	Alan Keating	Na Piarsaigh	3-10	19	3	6.33
6	Aindreas Ó Coinceannáin	Béal Átha'n Ghaorthaidh	1-14	17	4	4.25
6	Mícheál Ó Cróinín	Naomh Abán	1-14	17	4	4.25

In a single game

Rank	Player	Club	Tally	Total	Opposition
1	Daniel Goulding	Éire Óg	1-12	15	Bantry Blues
2	Alan Keating	Na Piarsaigh	2-05	11	Kiskeam
3	Daniel Goulding	Éire Óg	0-10	15	Nemo Rangers
4	Ruairí O'Hagan	Fermoy	1-06	9	Macroom
4	Arthur Coakley	Bantry Blues	1-06	9	Ballinora
5	Ruairí Deane	Bantry Blues	1-05	8	Éire Óg
5	Cian O'Riordan	Mallow	0-08	8	Béal Átha'n Ghaorthaidh
6	Cian Ó Duinnín	Béal Átha'n Ghaorthaidh	2-01	7	Newmarket
6	Ruairí Deane	Bantry Blues	1-04	7	Newmarket
6	Cian O'Riordan	Mallow	1-04	7	Kiskeam
6	Aindreas Ó Coinceannáin	Béal Átha'n Ghaorthaidh	1-04	7	Macroom
6	David Scannell	Kiskeam	1-04	7	Fermoy
6	Cian O'Riordan	Mallow	0-07	7	Bantry Blues
6	Seán O'Sullivan	Kiskeam	0-07	7	Na Piarsaigh
6	D. D. Dorgan	Grenagh	0-07	7	Newmarket
6	Mícheál Ó Cróinín	Naomh Abán	0-07	7	Fermoy
6	Ruairí O'Hagan	Fermoy	0-07	7	Kiskeam
