= 2006 Cork Junior A Football Championship =

- Dates: 8 October – 19 November 2006
- Teams: 8
- Sponsor: Evening Echo
- Champions: Adrigole (1st title); Darragh Carey (captain)
- Runners-up: Grenagh; James O'Neill (captain)

Tournament statistics
- Matches played: 9
- Goals scored: 8 (0.89 per match)
- Points scored: 139 (15.44 per match)

The 2006 Cork Junior A Football Championship was the 108th staging of the Cork Junior A Football Championship since its establishment by Cork County Board in 1895. The championship ran from 8 October to 19 November 2006.

The final was played on 19 November 2006 at Páirc Uí Rinn in Cork, between Adrigole and Grenagh, in what was their first ever meeting in the final. Adrigole won the match by 0–05 to 0–03 to claim their first ever championship title.

== Qualification ==
Division	Championship	Champions
Avondhu	North Cork Junior A Football Championship	Glanworth
Beara	Beara Junior A Football Championship	Adrigole
Carbery	South West Junior A Football Championship	Tadhg Mac Carthaigh
Carrigdhoun	South East Junior A Football Championship	Courcey Rovers
Duhallow	Duhallow Junior A Football Championship	Cullen
Imokilly	East Cork Junior A Football Championship	Fr O'Neill's
Muskerry	Mid Cork Junior A Football Championship	Grenagh
Seandún	City Junior A Football Championship	White's Cross
