= 1964 Cork Junior Football Championship =

- Dates: 18 October – 22 November 1964
- Teams: 8
- Champions: Kiskeam (1st title)
- Runners-up: Crosshaven

Tournament statistics
- Matches played: 7
- Goals scored: 16 (2.29 per match)
- Points scored: 98 (14 per match)

The 1964 Cork Junior Football Championship was the 66th staging of the Cork Junior A Football Championship since its establishment by the Cork County Board in 1895. The championship ran from 18 October to 22 November 1964.

The final was played on 22 November 1964 at the Castle Grounds in Macroom, between Kiskeam and Crosshaven, in what was their first ever meeting in the final. Kiskeam won the match by 1–10 to 1–01 to claim their first ever championship title.

== Qualification ==
Division	Championship	Representatives
Avondhu	North Cork Junior A Football Championship	Grange
Beara	Beara Junior A Football Championship	St Mary's
Carbery	South West Junior A Football Championship	Newcestown
Carrigdhoun	South East Junior A Football Championship	Crosshaven
Duhallow	Duhallow Junior A Football Championship	Kiskeam
Imokilly	East Cork Junior A Football Championship	Glanmire
Muskerry	Mid Cork Junior A Football Championship	Ballincollig
Seandún	City Junior A Football Championship	Na Piarsaigh

== Results ==
=== Quarter-finals ===
18 October 1964 Quarter-final	Kiskeam	3–07 – 0–06	St Mary's	Sam Maguire Park

18 October 1964 Quarter-final	Grangae	1–06 – 0–04	Ballincollig	O'Connell Park

25 October 1964 Quarter-final	Newcestown	2–04 – 1–02	Na Piarsaigh	Ballinhassig Grounds

25 October 1964 Quarter-final	Crosshaven	0–09 – 1–06	Glanmire	Cork Athletic Grounds

1 November 1964 Quarter-final replay	Crosshaven	0–10 – 1–05	Glanmire	Cork Athletic Grounds

=== Semi-finals ===
1 November 1964 Semi-final	Kiskeam	2–03 – 1–04	Newcestown	Castle Grounds

8 November 1964 Semi-final	Crosshaven	2–09 – 0–12	Grange	Cork Athletic Grounds

=== Final ===
22 November 1964 Final	Kiskeam	1–10 – 1–01	Crosshaven	Castle Grounds
