= 1946 Cork Junior Football Championship =

Irish hurling competition

- Champions: St Vincent's (1st title)
- Runners-up: Bere Island

The 1946 Cork Junior Football Championship was the 48th staging of the Cork Junior Football Championship since its establishment by the Cork County Board in 1895.

The final was played on 15 December 1946 at the Athletic Grounds in Ballingeary, between St Vincent's and Bere Island, in what was their first ever meeting in the final. St Vincent's won the match by 3–06 to 1–04 to claim their first ever championship title.

== Results ==
=== Final ===
15 December 1946 Final	St Vincent's	3–06 – 1–04	Bere Island	Cork Athletic Grounds
