= Bernie O'Neill =

Bernie O'Neill may refer to:

- Bernie O'Neill (politician), former member of the Pennsylvania House of Representatives
- Bernie O'Neill (bowls), Northern Irish lawn bowler
- Bernie O'Neill (Gaelic footballer) (born 1945), Irish Gaelic footballer
