= 1943 Cork Junior Football Championship =

Irish hurling competition

- Champions: Bere Island (1st title)
- Runners-up: Commercials

The 1943 Cork Junior Football Championship was the 45th staging of the Cork Junior Football Championship since its establishment by the Cork County Board in 1895.

The final was played on 28 November 1943 at the Athletic Grounds in Dunmanway, between Bere Island and Commercials, in what was their first ever meeting in the final. Bere Island won the match by 5–04 to 1–03 to claim their first ever championship title.

== Results ==
=== Final ===
28 November 1943 Final	Bere Island	5–04 – 1–03	Commercials	Dunmanway Athletic Grounds
