= 1948 Cork Senior Football Championship =

Gaelic football competition

- Dates: 4 April – 31 October 1948
- Teams: 17
- Champions: Millstreet (1st title); John O'Keeffe (captain)
- Runners-up: St. Vincent's; Eddie John O'Sullivan (captain)

Tournament statistics
- Matches played: 17
- Goals scored: 46 (2.71 per match)
- Points scored: 174 (10.24 per match)

The 1948 Cork Senior Football Championship was the 60th staging of the Cork Senior Football Championship since its establishment by the Cork County Board in 1887. The draw for the first round fixtures took place on 25 January 1948. The championship ran from 4 April to 31 October 1948.

Clonakilty were the defending champions, however, they were beaten by Fermoy in the first round.

The final was played on 31 October 1948 at the Athletic Grounds in Cork, between Millstreet and St Vincent's, in what was both teams' first ever appearance in the final overall. Millstreet won the match by 1–02 to 0–03 to claim their only championship title.

== Results ==
=== First round ===
4 April 1948 First round	St Patrick's	0-06 - 2-08	St Nicholas'	Douglas Grounds

4 April 1948 First round	St Vincent's	2-07 - 2-03	Castlemagner	Mallow Grounds

11 April 1948 First round	Duhallow	1-05 - 4-08	Avondhu	Buttevant Grounds

11 April 1948 First round	Macroom	1-06 - 1-11	St Finbarr's	Coachford Sportsfield

18 April 1948 First round	Army	4-05 - 1-03	Carbery	Clonakilty Grounds

18 April 1948 First round	Muskerry	0-01 - 2-10	University College Cork	Macroom Grounds

25 April 1948 First round	Beara	1-04 - 1-04	Millstreet	Inchigeelagh Grounds

9 May 1948 First round replay	Beara	3-03 - 3-05	Millstreet	Inchigeelagh Grounds

5 September 1948 First round	Fermoy	1-08 - 1-01	Clonakilty	Cork Athletic Grounds

- Commercials received a bye in this round.

=== Second round ===
2 May 1948 Second round	St Vincent's	2-07 - 0-01	Avondhu	Fitzgerald Memorial Park

2 May 1948 Second round	St Nicholas'	4-08 - 1-01	Commercials	Douglas Grounds

9 May 1948 Second round	University College Cork	2-07 - 0-04	Army	Camp Field

11 July 1948 Second round	Millstreet	1-02 - 0-04	St Finbarr's	Carrigadrohid Grounds

- Fermoy received a bye in this round.

=== Third round ===
19 September 1948 Third round	St Nicholas'	1-06 - 2-08	Fermoy	Cork Athletic Grounds

- Millstreet, St Vincent's and University College Cork received a bye in this round.

=== Semi-finals ===
15 August 1948 Semi-final	St Vincent's	1-06 - 0-05	University College Cork	Cork Athletic Grounds

3 October 1948 Semi-final	Millstreet	1-05 - 0-07	Fermoy	Cork Athletic Grounds

=== Final ===
31 October 1948 Final	Millstreet	1-02 - 0-03	St Vincent's	Cork Athletic Grounds
				Referee: D Ryan (Tralee)
