= John O'Keeffe (Cork Gaelic footballer) =

Irish Gaelic footballer (1925–2021)

Personal information
- Native name: Seán Ó Caoimh (Irish)
- Born: 1925 Millstreet, County Cork, Ireland
- Died: 2 February 2021 (aged 95) Newmarket, County Cork, Ireland

Sport
- Sport: Gaelic football
- Position: Right wing-back
Club
- Years: Club
- Millstreet
Club titles
- Cork titles: 1
Inter-county
Years	County	Apps (scores)
1949-1950	Cork	4 (0-00)
Inter-county titles
- Munster titles: 1
- All-Irelands: 0
- NFL: 0

John O'Keeffe (1925 – 2 February 2021) was an Irish Gaelic footballer who played for club side Millstreet and at inter-county level with the Cork senior football team.

== Career ==
O'Keeffe first came to Gaelic football prominence with the Millstreet club. He was club captain in 1948 when Millstreet defeated St. Vincent's to claim their only County Championship title. This success saw O'Keeffe drafted onto the Cork senior team the following year, and he was also appointed team captain. He won his only Munster Championship title that year.

== Death ==
O'Keeffe died in Newmarket, County Cork on 2 February 2021.

== Honours ==
Millstreet

- Cork Senior Football Championship: 1948 (c)

Cork

- Munster Senior Football Championship: 1949 (c)

Sporting positions
Preceded by Fachtna O'Donovan	Cork Senior Football Captain; 1949	Succeeded by John Cronin
