= Eddie John O'Sullivan =

Irish hurler

Personal information
- Native name: Éamonn Seán Ó Súilleabháin (Irish)
- Nickname: E. J.
- Born: 12 June 1919 Blackrock, Cork, Ireland
- Died: 7 January 1996 (aged 76) Buttevant, County Cork, Ireland

Sport
- Sport: Hurling
- Position: Full-forward
Club
- Years: Club
- 1937-1958: Blackrock
Club titles
- Cork titles: 1
Inter-county
Years	County	Apps (scores)
1943-1949	Cork	6 (0-03)
Inter-county titles
- Munster titles: 2
- All-Irelands: 1
- NHL: 0

Edward John O'Sullivan (11 June 1919 – 7 January 1996) was an Irish hurler who played at club level with Blackrock and at inter-county level with the Cork senior hurling team. He usually lined out as a forward. Following his retirement from GAA he took up golf and was the winner of the senior scratch cup in his home Club of Douglas Golf Club in 1969.

== Career ==
O'Sullivan was a dual player at club level, lining out with Blackrock in hurling and St. Vincent's in Gaelic football. He captained the latter to defeat by Millstreet in the 1948 Cork SFC final, having won a Cork JFC title two years previously. O'Sullivan's club hurling career coincided with a 25-year drought for Blackrock. After captaining the team to county final defeats in 1948 and 1954, he finally won a Cork SHC title in 1956. O'Sullivan first appeared on the inter-county scene as a member of the unsuccessful Cork minor football team in 1938. He made his debut with the Cork senior hurling team in a tournament game against Dublin in 1943, however, it would be a number of years before he joined the team properly. O'Sullivan was a reserve when Cork beat Kilkenny in the 1946 All-Ireland final. He was once again on the bench the following year when the result was reversed. O'Sullivan was also a part of Cork's 1947–48 National League-winning team.

== Death ==
O'Sullivan died at Heatherside Hospital in Buttevant, County Cork on 7 January 1996.

== Honours ==
St Vincent's

- Cork Junior A Football Championship: 1946
- City Junior A Football Championship: 1946, 1950

Blackrock

- Cork Senior Hurling Championship: 1956

Cork

- All-Ireland Senior Hurling Championship: 1946
- Munster Senior Hurling Championship: 1946, 1947
- National Hurling League: 1947–48
