= 1990 Cork Junior A Football Championship =

- Teams: 8
- Champions: Newcestown (2nd title)
- Runners-up: Castlemartyr

The 1990 Cork Junior A Football Championship was the 92nd staging of the Cork Junior A Football Championship since its establishment by Cork County Board in 1895.

The final was played on 2 December 1990 at the Ballinhassig Grounds, between Newcestown and Castlemartyr, in what was their first ever meeting in the final. Newcestown won the match by 0–12 to 0–05 to claim their second championship title overall and a first title in 23 years.

== Results ==
=== Final ===
2 December 1990 Final	Newcestown	0–12 – 0–05	Castlemartyr	Ballinhassig Grounds
