= 2009 Cork Junior A Football Championship =

- Teams: 8
- Sponsor: Evening Echo
- Champions: Glanworth (3rd title); Terence Ryan (captain); Stephen Linehan (captain)
- Runners-up: Ballygarvan

The 2009 Cork Junior A Football Championship was the 111th staging of the Cork Junior A Football Championship since its establishment by Cork County Board in 1895.

The final was played on 8 November 2009 at Páirc Uí Rinn in Cork, between Glanworth and Ballygarvan, in what was their first ever meeting in the final. Glanworth won the match by 0–08 to 0–05 to claim their third championship title overall and a first title 38 years.
