= Bernie O'Neill (Gaelic footballer) =

Irish Gaelic footballer

Personal information
- Native name: Beircheart Ó Néill (Irish)
- Born: 1945 (age 80–81) Adrigole, County Cork, Ireland
- Height: 5 ft 10 in (178 cm)

Sport
- Sport: Gaelic football
- Position: Left wing-forward
Clubs
- Years: Club
- Adrigole → Beara
Club titles
- Cork titles: 1
- Munster titles: 1
Inter-county
Years	County	Apps (scores)
1965-1973	Cork	14 (0-10)
Inter-county titles
- Munster titles: 3
- All-Irelands: 0
- NFL: 0
- All Stars: 0

Bernie O'Neill (born 1945 in Adrigole, County Cork) is an Irish former sportsperson. He played Gaelic football with his local club Adrigole and was a member of the Cork senior inter-county team in the 1960s and 1970s.

== Honours ==
Adrigole

- Cork Intermediate Football Championship: 1979
- Beara Junior Football Championship: 1962, 1966, 1968, 1970, 1971, 1972

Beara

- Munster Senior Club Football Championship: 1967 (c)
- Cork Senior Football Championship: 1967

Cork

- Munster Senior Football Championship: 1967, 1971, 1973
- Munster Under-21 Football Championship: 1965
