= Glengarriff GAA =

Gaelic games club in County Cork, Ireland

- CLG An Gleann Garbh
- Founded: 1981
- County: Cork
- Colours: Red and green
- Grounds: Páirc Garbh, Glengarriff
- Coordinates: 52°45′10.89″N 9°31′53.8″W

Playing kits
Standard colours

Glengarriff GAA (Irish: CLG An Gleann Garbh) is a Gaelic football club in Glengarriff, County Cork. It is in the Beara division of Cork GAA. They play in green and red colours and their home pitch is Páirc Garbh. The club fields U-21, minor and junior teams and underage teams from U-8 to U-16

The club was founded in 1981 after separating from the neighbouring Adrigole GFC.

== Achievements ==
- Cork Junior B Football Championship: 1999 (winners), 1997 (runners-up)
- Beara Junior A Football Championship: 2009 (winners)
- Beara Junior B Football Championship: 2020 (winners)
