= Patrick "Weeshie" Murphy =

Gaelic footballer and GAA administrator

Patrick Aloyius "Weeshie" Murphy was a Gaelic footballer and administrator with the Gaelic Athletic Association (GAA).

Born in Bere Island, he moved to Cork for work reasons. He played at full-back for Cork county team on the 1945 All-Ireland Senior Football Championship-winning team. He played his club football for Bere Island GFC, Beara GAA and Lees. He also played for St Finbarr's in Cork city.

He served as chairman of the Cork County Board from 1955 to 1965, and was chairman of the Munster Council at the time of his death in 1973. His son, Dr. Con Murphy, was a team doctor with several Cork inter-county teams.

Weesh was a veterinary surgeon who worked in Bandon, County Cork. He and his wife had five children.

The trophy awarded for the Cork U21 A Football Championship, the Pádraig A. Ó Murchú Cup, is named in his honour.
