= 1968 Cork Intermediate Hurling Championship =

Irish hurling competition

- Date: 7 April - 29 September 1968
- Teams: 18
- Champions: St. Vincent's (1st title); Paddy Barry (captain)
- Runners-up: Youghal

Tournament statistics
- Matches played: 18
- Goals scored: 89 (4.94 per match)
- Points scored: 286 (15.89 per match)

The 1968 Cork Intermediate Hurling Championship was the 59th staging of the Cork Intermediate Hurling Championship since its establishment by the Cork County Board in 1909. The draw for the opening round fixtures took place on 28 January 1968. The championship ran from 7 April to 29 September 1968.

The final was played on 29 September 1968 at the Athletic Grounds in Cork, between St. Vincent's and Youghal, in what was their first ever meeting in the final. St. Vincent's won the match by 2-11 to 1-12 to claim their first ever championship title.

== Results ==
=== First round ===
21 April 1968 First round	Carrigaline	3-05 - 2-10	Midleton	Cork Athletic Grounds

12 May 1968 First round	Castletownroche	7-03 - 1-05	Éire Óg	Carrigtwohill Grounds

=== Second round ===
7 April 1968 Second round	Rath Luirc	2-01 - 2-11	Carrigtwohill	Fitzgerald Memorial Park

14 April 1968 Second round	Kilworth	3-09 - 3-02	Nemo Rangers	Clonmult Memorial Grounds

14 April 1968 Second round	Shamrocks	1-04 - 3-10	Ballinhassig	Carrigaline Grounds
	N O'Mahony 1-0, J Flynn 0-2, B Hurley 0-1, R McCarthy 0-1.		S Holland 1-1, G O'Sullivan 1-1, M Hickey 1-1, JK Coleman 0-3, J Murphy 0-2, R Cullinane 0-1, T O'Mahony 0-1.

5 May 1968 Second round	Tracton	2-04 - 3-12	Cloyne	Cork Athletic Grounds

12 May 1968 Second round	Cobh	3-12 - 4-07	St. Vincent's	Carrigtwohill Grounds

2 June 1968 Second round	Ballymartle	3-08 - 2-15	Glen Rovers	Manning Park

2 June 1968 Second round	Mallow	2-06 - 7-09	Youghal	Cork Athletic Grounds
	K Sheehan 1-1, P Sheehan 1-0, L Sheehan 0-3, B Murphy 0-2.		F Keane 2-4, F Cooper 3-0, J Griffin 1-0, N Gallagher 1-0, P Hegarty 0-3, G Walsh 0-1, P Coleman 0-1.

16 June 1968 Second round	Midleton	3-10 - 6-08	Castletownroche	Fitzgerald Memorial Park

=== Quarter-finals ===
23 June 1968 Quarter-final	Ballinhassig	4-11 - 4-06	Carrigtwohill	Cork Athletic Grounds

7 July 1968 Quarter-final	St. Vincent's	3-08 - 2-09	Castletownroche	Bishop Casey Memorial Park
	N Barry 0-5, D Linehan 1-1, B Heffernan 1-0, D O'Regan 1-0, J O'Shea 0-1, P O'Neill 0-1.		R Browne 1-3, H Noonan 1-2, J Browne 0-3, D O'Neill 0-1.

7 July 1968 Quarter-final	Glen Rovers	2-12 - 3-08	Kilworth	Riverstown Sportsfield
	D O'Driscoll 1-1, T Buckley 0-4, N O'Connell 1-0, D O'Neill 0-3, R O'Connell 0-2, T O'Brien 0-1, S O'Riordan 0-1.		F Sheehy 1-3, D Fenton 1-1, D O'Riordan 0-4, J Condon 1-0.

28 July 1968 Quarter-final	Youghal	1-09 - 0-10	Cloyne	Castlemartyr Grounds
	N Gallagher 0-5, F Cooper 1-0, W Ryan 0-2, L Leahy 0-1, W Walsh 0-1.		P Ring 0-6, L Walsh 0-1, M O'Brien 0-1, J Aherne 0-1, D Daly 0-1.

=== Semi-finals ===
18 August 1968 Semi-final	St. Vincent's	1-12 - 2-09	Ballinhassig	Cork Athletic Grounds
	N Barry 0-5, J Coughlan 1-1, B Heffernan 0-2, C O'Shea 0-2, P O'Neill 0-1, D Linehan 0-1.		JK Coleman 1-5, M Hickey 1-0, D Coleman 0-2, B Coleman 0-1, J O'Mahony 0-1.	Referee: D O'Brien (Cobh)

25 August 1968 Semi-final	Youghal	w/o - scr.	Glen Rovers	Clonmult Memorial Grounds

8 September 1968 Semi-final replay	St. Vincent's	2-13 - 2-05	Ballinhassig	Cork Athletic Grounds
	C O'Shea 1-5, N Barry 1-2, D Linehan 0-3, J Russell 0-1, J Coughlan 0-1, B O'Neill 0-1.		JK Coleman 1-4, M Hickey 1-0, D Coleman 0-1.	Referee: D O'Brien (Cobh)

=== Final ===
29 September 1968 Final	Youghal	2-11 - 1-12	St. Vincent's	Cork Athletic Grounds
	B O'Neill 1-3, C O'Shea 0-5, J O'Shea 1-0, D Linehan 0-2, J Russell 0-1.		F Cooper 1-1, N Gallagher 0-4, W Ryan 0-2, S Delacour 0-2, P Hegarty 0-1, L Leahy 0-1, M Hodnett 0-1.	Referee: D O'Brien (Cobh)
