= Gavin Creedon =

Irish Gaelic footballer

Personal information
- Native name: Gabhán Ó Críodán (Irish)
- Born: 2001 (age 24–25) Dromahane, County Cork, Ireland
- Occupation: Student

Sport
- Sport: Gaelic Football
- Position: Goalkeeper
Clubs
- Years: Club
- 2020-present 2022-: Kilshannig → University College Cork
Club titles
- Cork titles: 0
College
- Years: College
- University College Cork
College titles
- Sigerson titles: 0
Inter-county*
Years	County	Apps (scores)
2020-present	Cork	0 (0-00)
Inter-county titles
- Munster titles: 0
- All-Irelands: 0
- NFL: 0
- All Stars: 0
- *Inter County team apps and scores correct as of 16:09, 13 March 2022.

Gavin Creedon (born 2001) is an Irish Gaelic footballer who plays at club level with KIlshannig and at inter-county level with the Cork senior football team. He usually lines out as a goalkeeper.

== Career ==
Creedon played Gaelic football at juvenile and underage levels with the Kilshannig club. He eventually progressed onto the club's top adult team in the Cork IAFC. Creedon first lined out at inter-county level with the Cork under-20 football team, with whom he won a Munster U20 Championship title in 2021. He joined the Cork senior football team as a member of the extended training panel in 2020.

== Career statistics ==
As of match played 13 March 2022.

Team	Year	National League			Munster		All-Ireland		Total	
Team	Year	Division	Apps	Score	Apps	Score	Apps	Score	Apps	Score
Cork	2021	Division 2	0	0-00	0	0-00	0	0-00	0	0-00
Cork	2022	Division 2	0	0-00	0	0-00	0	0-00	0	0-00
Total			0	0-00	0	0-00	0	0-00	20	0-00

== Honours ==
Kilshannig

- Cork Premier Intermediate Football Championship: 2024
- Cork Intermediate A Football Championship: 2022
