= Joe O'Sullivan =

Irish Gaelic footballer

Personal information
- Native name: Seosamh Ó Súilleabháin (Irish)
- Born: Beara, County Cork

Sport
- Sport: Gaelic football
- Position: Right wing-forward
Club
- Years: Club
- 1950s-1970s: Beara
Inter-county
- Years: County
- 1950s: Cork
Inter-county titles
- Munster titles: 1
- All-Irelands: 0
- NFL: 0

Joe O'Sullivan (born 1936 in Beara, County Cork) is an Irish former sportsperson. He played Gaelic football with his local club Beara and was a member of the Cork senior inter-county team in the 1950s.
