= 1979 Cork Intermediate Football Championship =

Gaelic football competition

- Champions: Adrigole (1st title)
- Runners-up: Kildorrery

The 1979 Cork Intermediate Football Championship was the 44th staging of the Cork Intermediate Football Championship since its establishment by the Cork County Board in 1909.

The final was played on 19 August 1978 at Páirc Uí Chaoimh in Cork, between Adrigole and Kildorrery, in what was their first ever meeting in the final. Adrigole won the match by 2–09 to 1–06 to claim their first ever championship title.

== Results ==
=== Final ===
19 August 1979 Final	Adrigole	2-09 - 1-06	Kildorrery	Páirc Uí Chaoimh
