= Kevin Jer O'Sullivan =

Irish Gaelic footballer

Personal information
- Native name: Caoimhín Diarmuid Ó Súilleabháin (Irish)
- Born: 1948 (age 77–78) Adrigole, County Cork, Ireland
- Height: 5 ft 8 in (173 cm)

Sport
- Sport: Gaelic football
- Position: Right wing-back
Club
- Years: Club
- 1965–1988: Adrigole
Club titles
- Cork titles: 1
- Munster titles: 1
Inter-county
Years	County	Apps (scores)
1968–1975	Cork	16 (0–5)
Inter-county titles
- Munster titles: 3
- All-Irelands: 1
- NFL: 0
- All Stars: 2

Kevin Jeremiah O'Sullivan (born 1948) is an Irish former Gaelic footballer who played as a right wing-back at senior level for the Cork county team.

Born in Adrigole, County Cork, O'Sullivan first arrived on the inter-county scene at the age of twenty when he first linked up with the Cork under-21 team. He made his senior debut during the 1968-69 league. O'Sullivan quickly became a regular member of the starting fifteen and won one All-Ireland medal and three Munster medals.

As a member of the Munster inter-provincial team for five consecutive years O'Sullivan won two Railway Cup medals. With divisional side Beara he is a one-time Munster medallist while he also won one championship medal. With Adrigole O'Sullivan won numerous championship medals in all grades.

Throughout his career, O'Sullivan made 16 championship appearances. He retired from inter-county football following the conclusion of the 1975 championship. He is widely regarded as the greatest footballer ever to come out of Beara.
