= Ruairí Deane =

Irish Gaelic footballer

Ruairí Deane (The Viking)
Personal information
- Native name: Ruairí Ó Déin (An Viking) (Irish)
- Born: 3 September 1991 (age 35) Bantry County Cork, Ireland
- Occupation: Secondary School principal
- Height: 6 ft 2 in (188 cm)

Sport
- Sport: Gaelic football
- Position: Midfield
Club
- Years: Club
- Bantry
Club titles
- Cork titles: Cork
- Munster titles: Munster
Inter-county
- Years: County
- Cork
Inter-county titles
- Munster titles: 0
- All-Irelands: 0
- NHL: 0
- All Stars: 0

Ruairí Deane (born 3 September 1991) is an Irish Gaelic footballer who plays as a midfielder for the Cork senior team. From the Bantry Blues club, Ruairi works as a teacher. He captained the Cork 2013 Junior Football team to Munster and All-Ireland glory, playing at midfield. He is currently a principal in a Scoil Phobail Bhéara.

== Career statistics ==
As of match played 8 November 2020.

Team	Year	National League			Munster		All-Ireland		Total	
Team	Year	Division	Apps	Score	Apps	Score	Apps	Score	Apps	Score
Cork	2014	Division 1	3	0-00	1	0-00	0	0-00	4	0-00
Cork	2015	Division 1	0	0-00	2	0-00	0	0-00	2	0-00
Cork	2016	Division 1	7	0-01	1	0-00	2	0-00	10	0-01
Cork	2017	Division 2	7	1-03	3	0-00	1	0-00	11	1-03
Cork	2018	Division 2	5	0-02	2	0-00	1	0-01	8	0-03
Cork	2019	Division 2	7	1-03	2	1-00	4	0-04	13	2-07
Cork	2020	Division 3	5	1-03	1	0-00	0	0-00	6	1-03
Total			34	3-12	12	1-00	8	0-05	54	4-17

== Honours ==
Bantry Blues

- West Cork Under-21 Football Championship (1): 2012
- Division 2 Cork County League (1): 2012
- Division 3 Cork County League (1): 2010

Cork

- All-Ireland Junior Football Championship (1): 2013 (c)
- Munster Junior Football Championship (1): 2013 (c)
- Munster Under-21 Football Championship (1): 2012
- All-Ireland Fresher Football League (1): 2010/11
- McGrath Cup (2): 2016, 2018

Achievements
Preceded by Marcus Mangan (Kerry)	All-Ireland Junior Football Final winning captain 2013	Succeeded by Incumbent
