= Garnish GAA =

Gaelic games club in County Cork, Ireland

Garnish
- Gairnis
- Founded: 1927
- County: Cork
- Colours: Green and yellow

Playing kits
Standard colours

Senior Club Championships
	All Ireland	Munster champions	Cork champions
Football:	0	0	0

Garnish GAA is a Gaelic Athletic Association club located in Allihies, County Cork, Ireland. The club, situated in the heart of the Beara Peninsula is exclusively concerned with the game of Gaelic football. The club plays in the Beara division of Cork GAA.

== Honours ==
- Beara Junior Football Championship (17): 1928, 1932, 1940, 1948, 1951, 1952, 1953, 1978, 1979, 1995, 1996, 1997, 2003, 2013, 2014, 2016, 2017, 2018
