= St Vincent's GAA (Cork) =

Gaelic games club in County Cork, Ireland

St Vincent's
- Cumann Uinsinn Naofa
- Founded: 1943
- County: Cork
- Colours
- Grounds: Páirc Uinsinn

Playing kits
Standard colours

Senior Club Championships
	All Ireland	Munster champions	Cork champions
Football:	0	0	0
Hurling:	0	0	0

St Vincent's Hurling and Football Club is a Gaelic Athletic Association club in Cork, Ireland. Founded in 1943, the club is affiliated to the Seandún Board and the Cork County Board and fields teams in Gaelic football, hurling and camogie.

== History ==
Located in the Blarney Street and Sundays Well areas on the northside of Cork city, but also drawing players from Gurranabraher, Churchfield and Knocknaheeny, St Vincent's Hurling and Football Club was established in 1943. The club spent the early years of its existence operating in the junior grades in both codes and won three City JFC and three City JHC titles between 1946 and 1966.

St Vincent's had its first major success in December 1946, when the club won the Cork JFC following a 3–06 to 1–04 win over Bere Island. Two years later the same team was beaten by Millstreet in the 1948 Cork SFC final. St Vincent's had its first major hurling success in September 1968, when Youghal were beaten by 2–11 to 1–12 to win the Cork IHC title.

The 21st century saw a resurgence in Gaelic football in the club. St Vincent's returned to the top tier of Cork football with Cork PIFC title wins in 2006 and 2012. St Vincent's were also beaten by Finuge in the 2012 Munster Club IFC final.

== Honours ==
- Cork Premier Intermediate Football Championship (2): 2006, 2012
- Cork Intermediate Hurling Championship (1): 1968
- Cork Junior Football Championship (1): 1946
- Cork City Junior Hurling Championship (3): 1951, 1954, 1957
- Cork City Junior Football Championship (3): 1946, 1950, 1966
- Cork City Junior C Football Championship (1): 2021
- Cork Premier Minor Football Championship (1): 1998
- Cork Minor Hurling Championship (1): 1957
- Cork Minor B Football Championship (1): 1990
- Cork Minor B Hurling Championship (1): 1986

== Notable players ==
- Paddy Barry: All-Ireland SHC-winning captain (1970)
- Amy O'Connor: All-Ireland SCC-winning captain (2023)
- Paddy O'Shea: All-Ireland SFC-winner (2010)
- Miah Dennehy: Republic of Ireland international footballer
