= Castletownbere GFC =

Gaelic games club in County Cork, Ireland

- Cumann Peile Bhaile Chaisleáin Béara
- Founded: 1927
- County: Cork
- Nickname: The Magpies
- Colours
- Grounds: Páirc Bhaile Chaisleáin Béara

Playing kits
Standard colours

Castletownbere GAA is a Gaelic Athletic Association club based in Castletownbere in County Cork, Ireland. Its Gaelic Football team participates in competitions organized by Cork GAA, and is a member of Beara division. The club, like the other Beara clubs, does not field a hurling team.

== History ==
The Castletownbere GAA Club like most of the GAA Clubs in Beara was officially affiliated to the GAA in 1927, when the divisional system was established. Gaelic Football was however played for many years prior to 1927 in Castletownbere and there were various teams throughout the parish. There was a team from the Town called The Magpies who wore Black and White jerseys. These were the colours adopted by the club when it affiliated in 1927. The colours did change to green and subsequently blue but have long since returned to the traditional Black and White. The club had to wait until 1942 to contest its first Beara Championship final and a further five years until 1947 to win the Beara Title for the first time. Between 1947 and 1976 the club won nine Divisional Championships. In 1963, 1964, and 1965 a second team from the parish Rosmacowen entered the Beara Championship. The two teams met in the Beara Championship in 1965 with the Castletownbere team winning. Between 1966 and 1970 Rosmacowen formed a team with Bere Island called St Brendan's. In 1974 Castletownbere club contested its first Cork Junior Football Championship Final when a team captained by Donal Holland lost by 1-7 0-8 to Fermoy. This was repeated in 1976 when Castlehaven defeated a team captained by Ger Batt O Sullivan by 3-7 to 0-6 in the County Final. 1977 proved to be a historical year for the club when on the occasion of its 50th anniversary a team captained by Seanie O Sullivan won the club's tenth Beara Championship and first County Championship. Rockchapel were defeated in the county final at Macroom on a score line of 3-5 to 0-8. In 1978 Castletownbere entered the Intermediate ranks and played at this level until 1986 when they won the Cork Intermediate Football Championship. Once again, the venue was Macroom, as the club beat Kilshannig by 1-8 to 0-7. The 1987 season saw Castletownbere compete at senior level for the first time when they defeated Carrigdhoun by 4-11 to 0-5 in the first round of the championship. They were eventually beaten at the quarter-final stage by the reigning County Champions Imokilly. The club again played in the senior championship in 1988 before returning to the intermediate grade in 1989. The club contested five County Intermediate finals in 1990, 1997, 1999, 2006 and 2011 but it was only in 2012 that they would finally win the intermediate championship. Captained by Alan O Regan, Castletownbere defeated Éire Óg on a scoreline of 1-12 to 0-13.

== Achievements ==
- Cork Intermediate A Football Championship Winners (2) 1986, 2012 Runner-Up 1990, 1997, 1999, 2006, 2011
- Cork Junior A Football Championship Winners (1) 1977 Runner-Up 1974, 1976
- Cork Minor B Football Championship Winners (3) 1996, 2002, 2003
- Beara Junior A Football Championship - Winners (10) 1947, 1949, 1963, 1965, 1967, 1969, 1974, 1975, 1976, 1977

== Notable players ==
- Joe O'Sullivan - played in 1957 All-Ireland Senior Football Championship final
- Donagh Wiseman - winner of All-Ireland Junior Football Championship medals with Cork
- Andrew O Sullivan - Winner of All-Ireland Junior Football Championship medals with Cork and captain of the Cork U-21 Football All Ireland winning team in 2007
- Neil Murphy - Winner of 1989 All-Ireland Under-21 Football Championship final and 1987 All-Ireland Junior Football Championship final with Cork

== External sources ==
- Club website
