= Kiskeam GAA =

Gaelic games club in County Cork, Ireland

- Coiscéim
- Founded: 1945
- County: Cork
- Nickname: The Blacks
- Colours
- Grounds: O'Connor-McLoughlin Memorial Park
- Coordinates: 52°10′40″N 9°9′21″W

Playing kits
Home kit	Change Kit

Senior Club Championships
	All Ireland	Munster champions	Cork champions
Football:	0	0	0

Kiskeam GAA is a Gaelic Athletic Association (GAA) club in Kiskeam, County Cork, Ireland. The club is affiliated to the Duhallow Board and is exclusively concerned with the game of Gaelic football.

== History ==
Located in the village of Kiskeam, about halfway between Boherbue and Ballydesmond near the Cork–Kerry border, Kiskeam GAA club was founded in November 1945. The new club subsequently affiliated to the Duhallow Board as a novice team. Success was immediate, with Kiskeam winning the Duhallow Novice FC in 1947.

A change of jersey colour from blue and yellow to an all black strip in 1964 was followed by a change in the club's fortunes. Kiskeam were undefeated in 17 games and won every available divisional adult title that year, including a first Duhallow JAFC title. Kiskeam also won the Cork JFC title that year, following a 1–10 to 1–01 win over Crosshaven in the final.

30 years went by before Kiskeam won their second Duhallow JAFC title in 1994. Six such titles were won in the eight-year period that followed, with Kiskeam also winning a second Cork JAFC title in 2002. The club was one of the 12 participants in the inaugural Cork PIFC in 2006. A decade later, Kiskeam won the Cork PIFC and secured top tier status for the first time ever, following a 2–12 to 0–14 win over Fermoy.

== Honours ==
- Cork Premier Intermediate Football Championship (1): 2016
- Cork Junior A Football Championship (2): 1964, 2002
- Duhallow Junior A Football Championship (7): 1964, 1994, 1996, 1997, 1999, 2000, 2002
- Cork Senior Football League Division 2 (1): 2011
- Cork Minor A Football Championship (1): 2010
- Duhallow Under-21 B Football Championship (1): 2016
- North Cork Minor B Football Championship (1): 2013
- North Cork Minor B Football League (1): 2013
- Duhallow Cup (1): 2021

== Notable players ==
- Seán Meehan: All-Ireland U20FC–winner (2019)
