= Bere Island GFC =

Gaelic games club in County Cork, Ireland

- CPG An tOileán Mór
- Founded: 1900s
- County: Cork
- Colours: Red and White
- Grounds: "The Rec", Rerrin, Bere Island
- Coordinates: 51.632°N 9.820°W

Playing kits
Standard colours

Bere Island GFC is a Gaelic Athletic Association club based on Bere Island in County Cork, Ireland. The club's Gaelic football team participates in competitions organised by Cork GAA, and it plays in the Beara division.

== History ==
The club is known to have played its first game around the start of the 20th century. The population of the island was much stronger at this time, (Note: As of 1901, Bere Island had a population of 1,059. The 2002 census recorded 207 inhabitants.) and the facilities were as good as any club in the county at the time. Bere Island's home pitch, known as the 'Rec', is the site of a former British Army recreation grounds in Rerrin.

During the 1930s and 1940s, Bere Island had their most successful period. While they reached a county final in 1944, the team disbanded and started again a number of times in the following decades.

The team was reformed in 1995, winning the Beara Junior B title in 1996 and 2008. Club members have also represented Beara GAA a number of times in the Cork County Championship.

As the population of Bere Island has reduced as of the early 21st century, a number of club members play Gaelic football "on the mainland" with clubs in Castletownbere or Glengarriff.

== Honours ==
- Cork Junior A Football Championship (1): 1943 (runners-up in 1941 and 1946)
- Beara Junior A Football Championship (7): 1930, 1936, 1939, 1941, 1942, 1981, 1985
- Beara Junior B Football Championship (2): 1996, 2008
- Beara Junior C Football Championship (1): 2023

== Notable players ==
- Patrick "Weeshie" Murphy - played with Cork Senior Football team and on Railway Cup teams from 1944-1952
