= Adrigole GFC =

Gaelic football club in County Cork, Ireland

- CPG Eadargóil
- Founded: 1927
- County: Cork
- Colours: Red and White
- Grounds: Páirc Eadargóil

Playing kits
Standard colours

Adrigole GFC is a Gaelic Athletic Association club located in the village of Adrigole in County Cork, Ireland. The club, situated in the Beara Peninsula, is exclusively concerned with the game of Gaelic football.

== History ==
Located in the village of Adrigole in the Beara Peninsula, Adrigole GAA Club was founded in 1927 following the establishment of the Beara Board. The club has spent most of its existence operating in the Beara JAFC, winning 22 titles from 33 final appearances. The club achieved senior status for the first time after their 2-09 to 1-06 defeat of Kildorrery in the 1979 Cork IFC final. After eventually being relegated back to the junior ranks, Adrigole claimed the Cork JAFC title after a 0-05 to 0-03 defeat of Grenagh in 2006.

== Honours ==
- Cork Intermediate Football Championship (1): 1979
- Cork Junior A Football Championship (1): 2006
- Beara Junior A Football Championship (22): 1929, 1938, 1961, 1962, 1966, 1968, 1970, 1971, 1972, 1984, 1986, 1989, 1993, 1994, 1998, 1999, 2000, 2001, 2002, 2004, 2005, 2006

== Notable players ==
- Bernie O'Neill: Munster SFC-winner (1967, 1971, 1973)
- Mort O'Shea: All-Ireland SFC-winner (1911)
- Kevin Jer O'Sullivan: All-Ireland SFC-winner (1973)
- John Lack O'Sullivan: Australian Football International Cup-winner (2002)
- Brendan Jer O'Sullivan: Munster SFC-winner (1999, 2002)
