= Kilshannig GAA =

Gaelic games club in County Cork, Ireland

Kilshannig
- Cill Seannaigh
- Founded: 1945
- County: Cork
- Nickname: The Blues
- Colours
- Grounds: Liam O'Connell Memorial Park
- Coordinates: 52°06′16.02″N 8°44′54.90″W

Playing kits
Standard colours

Senior Club Championships
	All Ireland	Munster champions	Cork champions
Football:	0	0	0

Kilshannig GAA is a Gaelic Athletic Association club in the parish of Glantane, County Cork, Ireland. The club is affiliated to the North Cork Board and fields teams in both hurling and Gaelic football.

== History ==
Located in the parish of Glantane, which encompasses the villages of Glantane, Dromahane and Bweeng, the club is named in honour of St Senach, who founded a church in the locality. Gaelic games have been played in the area since the early years of the Gaelic Athletic Association, with a number of clubs representing the parish in the early years, including Lombardstown and Brittas Rovers.

In 1945, a meeting was held to form one team in the parish called Kilshannig United. The new club won a number of novice titles before claiming the first of 10 North Cork JAFC titles in 1959. Kilshannig won further divisional titles in the 1960 and 1970s, before winning the club's first Cork JAFC in 1985. A Cork IFC title followed three years later in 1988 and senior status for the first time. The club subsequently regraded but won a second Cork JAFC title in 1996.

Kilshannig won its third Cork JAFC title in 2019, after a defeat of St James' in the final. This was followed by a second Cork IAFC title in 2022, after a 1–16 to 0–10 win over Aghabullogue, and a Cork PIFC title in 2024 and senior status once again, after another win over Aghabullogue in a replay. Kilshannig claimed their first ever hurling title in 2025, when the club won the Cork JAHC title after a 1–19 to 0–11 win over Ballinora. The club followed this by claiming the Cork PJHC in 2026, after a 1-23 to 2-19 win over St Catherine's.

== Grounds ==
Kilshannig's home ground is Liam O'Connell Memorial Park. It is named in honour of IRA volunteer Liam O'Connell, who was killed during the War of Independence in October 1920. While a field for all sports had been in use since 1958, the official opening took place on 23 June 1963 and featured a Gaelic football match between Cork and Galway. A new complex was later developed, featuring an indoor AstroTurf pitch.

== Honours ==
- Cork Premier Intermediate Football Championship (1): 2024
- Cork Intermediate A Football Championship (2): 1988, 2022
- Cork Premier Junior Hurling Championship (1): 2026
- Cork Junior A Football Championship (3): 1985, 1996, 2019
- Cork Junior A Hurling Championship (1): 2025
- North Cork Junior A Hurling Championship (2): 2022, 2025
- North Cork Junior A Football Championship (10): 1959, 1965, 1967, 1968, 1976, 1982, 1985, 1996, 2014, 2019
- Cork Junior B Hurling Championship (1): 1988
- Cork Under-21 B Football Championship (1): 2017
- Cork Under-21 B Hurling Championship (1): 2017
- Cork Minor B Hurling Championship (2): 2009, 2015
- Cork Minor B Hurling League (1): 2009
- Cork Premier 2 Minor Football Championship (1): 2018
- Cork Premier 2A Minor Football League (1): 2017
- Cork Minor A Football Championship (1): 2016
- North Cork Junior B Football Championship (1): 2019
- Cork Credit Union League Division 6 (1): 2021

== Notable players ==
- Gavin Creedon
- Johnny O'Flynn
- Éanna O'Hanlon
- Killian O'Hanlon
