= Beara Junior A Football Championship =

Gaelic football competition

- Irish: Craobh Peile Sóisear A Bhéara
- Code: Gaelic football
- Founded: 1927
- Abolished: 2020
- Region: Beara (GAA)
- Trophy: Cormac O'Sullivan Cup
- No. of teams: 2 (2019)
- Last Title holders: Urhan (28th title)
- Most titles: Urhan (28 titles)

The Beara Junior A Football Championship (abbreviated to the Beara JAFC) was a club Gaelic football competition organised by the Beara Board of the Gaelic Athletic Association. It was contested annually by the top-ranking junior clubs in the Beara Peninsula.

The first tournament was held in 1927. It was initially a straight knockout tournament but went through a number of format changes throughout its history, including a round-robin system. The winners, as well as receiving the Cormac O'Sullivan Cup, qualified for the subsequent Cork Junior A Football Championship.

The tournament ran for 92 years, with the final edition held in 2019, after which it was discontinued. The title was won at least once by nine different clubs. The all-time record-holders are Urhan, who have won a total of 28 titles.

== History ==
The Beara Divisional Board was established on 4 April 1927 and immediately organised a Gaelic football championship for the affiliated teams, which included Urhan, Castletownbere, Garnish, Bere Island, Ardgroom and Allihies. The inaugural final took place on 10 July 1927, with Urhan claiming the title after a 2-03 to 2-02 defeat of Allihies. Urhan eventually became the most successful team in the championship, winning 18 titles from 44 final appearances. Lauragh, a team geographically located in Kerry, won the Beara JFC title in 1937. The championship was not held in 1945 and 1946. Urhan and Garnish were the only two teams left taking part in the championship by 2019. Garnish regraded to the Beara JBFC in 2020, leaving Urhan as the only team left, and the championship was discontinued.

== Qualification for subsequent competitions ==
The Beara Junior A Football Championship winners qualified, along with the seven other divisional champions, for the subsequent Cork Junior A Football Championship. From 2017, the runners-up were also allowed to the take part.

== Trophy and medals ==
The Cormac O'Sullivan Cup was the prize for winning the championship. It was named in honour of Cormac O'Sullivan who played for Garnish, Beara and Cork, and who died in a drowning accident on 1 January 1973. The cup replaced the existing Crowley Cup in 1974. Castletownbere were the first winners and would go on and complete four-in-a-row. The cup was returned to the O'Sullivan family in 2024. In accordance with GAA rules, the Beara Board awarded a set of medals to the championship winners.

== Roll of honour ==
=== By club ===
#	Club	Titles	Runners-up	Championships won	Championships runner-up
1	Urhan	28	16	1927, 1931, 1933, 1934, 1943, 1944, 1950, 1955, 1956, 1957, 1958, 1959, 1973, 1980, 1982, 1983, 1987, 1988, 1990, 1991, 1992, 2007, 2008, 2010, 2011, 2012, 2015, 2019	1932, 1947, 1953, 1972, 1975, 1977, 1978, 1989, 2001, 2003, 2004, 2006, 2013, 2016, 2017, 2018
2	Adrigole	22	11	1929, 1938, 1961, 1962, 1966, 1968, 1970, 1971, 1972, 1984, 1986, 1989, 1993, 1994, 1998, 1999, 2000, 2001, 2002, 2004, 2005, 2006	1930, 1933, 1941, 1965, 1967, 1969, 1974, 1979, 1985, 1987, 1992
3	Garnish	18	23	1928, 1932, 1940, 1948, 1951, 1952, 1953, 1978, 1979, 1995, 1996, 1997, 2003, 2013, 2014, 2016, 2017, 2018	1929, 1935, 1938, 1944, 1957, 1958, 1961, 1963, 1964, 1976, 1980, 1983, 1990, 1991, 1999, 2000, 2002, 2005, 2008, 2009, 2011, 2012, 2019
4	Castletownbere	10	14	1947, 1949, 1963, 1965, 1967, 1969, 1974, 1975, 1976, 1977	1942, 1950, 1951, 1955, 1959, 1971, 1973, 1981, 1982, 1988, 1994, 1996, 1997, 1998
5	Bere Island	7	10	1930, 1936, 1939, 1941, 1942, 1981, 1985	1928, 1934, 1937, 1943, 1949, 1954, 1956, 1962, 1984, 1986
6	St. Mary's, Ardgroom	2	2	1954, 1964	1966, 1970
7	Glengarriff	1	7	2009	1952, 1993, 1995, 2007, 2010, 2014, 2015
7	Allihies	1	2	1935	1927, 1936
7	Lauragh	1	1	1937	1948
10	Eyeries	0	2	—	1939, 1940
10	St. Brendan’s	0	1	—	1968

== List of finals ==
=== List of Beara JAFC finals ===
Year	Winners		Runners-up	
Year	Club	Score	Club	Score
2023–present	No championship			
2020–2022	Urhan represented the division			
2019	Urhan	2-10	Garnish	1-09
2018	Garnish	0-11	Urhan	0-07
2017	Garnish	0-13	Urhan	0-09
2016	Garnish	0-09	Urhan	0-07
2015	Urhan	5-18	Glengarriff	0-06
2014	Garnish	0-08	Glengarriff	0-02
2013	Garnish	0-14	Urhan	2-07
2012	Urhan	(r) 2-07	Garnish	2-06
2011	Urhan	0-12, 0-08	Garnish	0-12, 0-07
2010	Urhan	1-11	Glengarriff	0-09
2009	Glengarriff	2-07	Garnish	1-08
2008	Urhan	1-09	Garnish	0-07
2007	Urhan	2-11	Glengarriff	1-07
2006	Adrigole	0-11	Urhan	2-04
2005	Adrigole	0-13	Garnish	0-06
2004	Adrigole	1-17	Urhan	1-06
2003	Garnish	2-07, 1-15, 1-12	Urhan	1-10, 2-12, 1-09
2002	Adrigole	1-09	Garnish	0-04
2001	Adrigole	0-15	Urhan	1-07
2000	Adrigole	1-11	Garnish	1-05
1999	Adrigole	0-13, 2-12	Garnish	0-13, 0-07
1998	Adrigole	1-13	Castletownbere	0-08
1997	Garnish	0-12	Castletownbere	0-05
1996	Garnish	0-15	Castletownbere	1-06
1995	Garnish	3-14	Glengarriff	1-08
1994	Adrigole	1-10	Castletownbere	0-06
1993	Adrigole	0-13	Glengarriff	0-07
1992	Urhan	2-10	Adrigole	1-08
1991	Urhan	1-10	Garnish	1-05
1990	Urhan	1-08	Garnish	1-10
1989	Adrigole	0-10, 0-08	Urhan	1-07, 0-07
1988	Urhan	3-08	Castletownbere	1-05
1987	Urhan	0-09	Adrigole	0-07
1986	Adrigole	1-09	Bere Island	1-04
1985	Bere Island	2-05	Adrigole	0-05
1984	Adrigole	2-08	Bere Island	1-03
1983	Urhan	0-13	Garnish	1-03
1982	Urhan	0-13	Castletownbere	2-06
1981	Bere Island	2-10	Castletownbere	2-05
1980	Urhan	1-10, 2-10	Garnish	2-07, 3-06
1979	Garnish	1-15	Adrigole	1-03
1978	Garnish	0-09	Urhan	0-08
1977	Castletownbere	1-06	Urhan	0-04
1976	Castletownbere	1-11	Garnish	1-06
1975	Castletownbere	2-14	Urhan	1-04
1974	Castletownbere	3-09	Adrigole	0-14
1973	Urhan	2-05	Castletownbere	0-10
1972	Adrigole	1-11	Urhan	2-05
1971	Adrigole	3-08	Castletownbere	2-06
1970	Adrigole	w/o	St. Mary's	scr.
1969	Castletownbere	0-11	Adrigole	0-04
1968	Adrigole	2-11	St. Brendan's	1-00
1967	Castletownbere	0-09	Adrigole	1-01
1966	Adrigole	3-10	St. Mary's	0-05
1965	Castletownbere	1-09	Adrigole	2-04
1964	St. Mary's	1-09	Garnish	1-03
1963	Castletownbere	1-04	Garnish	0-02
1962	Adrigole	3-06	Bere Island	0-03
1961	Adrigole	1-04	Garnish	0-03
1960	Urhan		Garnish	
1959	Urhan	1-04	Castletownbere	1-03
1958	Urhan	2-03	Garnish	1-02
1957				
1956	Urhan	1-06	Bere Island	0-02
1955	Urhan	0-06 (D), 2-05 (R)	Castletownbere	2-00 (D), 1-01 (R)
1954	St. Mary's	0-06 (D), W/O in replay	Bere Island	1-03 (D)
1953	Garnish	1-09	Urhan	0-04
1952	Garnish		Glengarriff	
1951	Garnish	2-03 (D), 1-05 (R)	Castletownbere	2-03 (D), 0-02 (R)
1950	Urhan	2-03	Castletownbere	0-03
1949	Castletownbere	2-04	Bere Island	1-02
1948	Garnish	1-08	Lauragh	0-04
1947	Castletownbere	0-02	Urhan	0-02
1945–1946	No championship			
1944	Urhan	1-07	Garnish	1-03
1943	Urhan	3-03	Bere Island	1-04
1942	Bere Island	4-07	Castletownbere	0-02
1941	Bere Island	2-04	Adrigole	0-03
1940	Garnish	1-04	Eyeries	0-03
1939	Bere Island	1-01	Eyeries	0-03
1938	Adrigole	0-02, 1-02	Garnish	0-02, 0-02
1937	Lauragh	4-01	Bere Island	0-06
1936	Bere Island	3-04	Allihies	1-03
1935	Allihies	2-00	Garnish	0-02
1934	Urhan	0-05	Bere Island	1-01
1933	Urhan		Adrigole	
1932	Garnish		Urhan	
1931	Urhan		N/A - League	
1930	Bere Island	2-05	Adrigole	0-03
1929	Adrigole	1-02	Garnish	1-00
1928	Garnish		Bere Island	
1927	Urhan	2-03	Allihies	2-02

==== Notes ====
- 1947 - Game abandoned, and awarded to Castletownbere
- 1957 - Final Urhan vs Garnish not played - Urhan selected to represent Beara
- 1960 - Not played - Adrigole suspended and Urhan selected to represent Beara after beating Garnish in the semi final

== Records and statistics ==
=== By decade ===
The most successful team of each decade, judged by number of Beara Junior A Football Championship titles, is as follows:

- 1920's: 1 each for Urhan (1926), Garnish (1928) and Adrigole (1929)
- 1930's: 3 each for Bere Island (1930, 36, 39) and Urhan (1931, 33, 34)
- 1940's: 2 each for Garnish (1940, 48), Bere Island (1941, 42), Urhan (1943, 44) and Castletownbere (1947, 49)
- 1950's: 5 for Urhan (1950, 55, 56, 58, 59)
- 1960's: 4 each for Adrigole (1961, 62, 66, 68) and Castletownbere (1963, 65, 67, 69)
- 1970's: 4 for Castletownbere (1974, 75, 76, 77)
- 1980's: 5 for Urhan (1980, 82, 83, 87, 88)
- 1990's: 4 for Adrigole (1993, 94, 98, 99)
- 2000's: 6 for Adrigole (2000, 01, 02, 04, 05, 06)
- 2010's: 5 each for Urhan (2010, 11, 12, 15, 19) and Garnish (2013, 14, 16, 17, 18)

== See also ==
- Beara GAA
