= Beara GAA =

Gaelic games club in County Cork, Ireland

- County: Cork
- Colours: Red and White
- Grounds: Various

Playing kits
Standard colours

Senior Club Championships
	All Ireland	Munster champions	Cork champions
Football:	-	1	6

Beara GAA is a division of Cork GAA, and is responsible for organizing Gaelic Athletic Association games in the Beara Peninsula in County Cork, Ireland. It is one of eight divisions of Cork County Board. It organizes competitions for the clubs within the division, from Under 12 up to the adult level. The winners of these competitions compete against other divisional champions to determine which club is the county champion. Currently, the following clubs are part of the Beara division: Castletownbere, Adrigole, Urhan, Garnish, Bere Island and Glengarriff. It has no senior football team so the only representative in the Cork Senior Football Championship is the divisional team. The division also competes in the Cork Minor Football Championship and the Cork Under-21 Football Championship. Beara is a Gaelic football stronghold, with very little hurling played, and no competitions organized.

== Member clubs ==
- Adrigole
- Bere Island
- Castletownbere
- Garnish
- Glengarriff
- Urhan

=== Football grades ===
Championship	Club
Senior
Premier Senior	Beara
Senior A	None
Intermediate
Premier Intermediate	Castletownbere
Intermediate A	Adrigole
Junior
Premier Junior	Urhan
Junior A	None
Junior B	Adrigole (2)
Junior B	Castletownbere (2)
Junior B	Garnish
Junior B	Glengarriff
Junior B	Urhan (2)
Junior C	Bere Island
Junior C	Adrigole (3)

== History ==
The Beara division was formed in 1927 when the Cork County Board divided the county into 8 divisions.

== Honours ==
- Munster Senior Club Football Championship
  - (gold) Winners (1): 1968
- Cork Premier Senior Football Championship
  - (gold) Winners (6): 1932, 1933, 1934, 1940, 1967, 1997
  - (silver) Runners-Up (1): 1939
- Cork Minor Football Championship
  - (gold) Winners (4): 1988, 2003, 2009, 2021
  - (silver) Runners-Up (3): 1963, 1989, 1990
- Cork Under-21 Football Championship
  - (gold) Winners (4): 1996, 1997, 1999, 2006
  - (silver) Runners-Up (6): 1975, 1977, 1979, 1980, 1990, 1991

== Notable players ==
- Paddy Harrington
- Nealie Duggan
- Bernie O'Neill
- Mort O'Shea
- Joe O'Sullivan
- Kevin Jer O'Sullivan
- John Lack O'Sullivan

== Beara competitions ==
Competition	Year	Champions	Runners-up
Championship
Beara Junior A Football Championship	2019	Urhan	Garnish
Beara Junior B Football Championship	2022	Urhan	Adrigole
Beara Junior C Football Championship	2023	Bere Island	Castletownbere
Beara U21 Football Championship	2020	Adrigole	
