= 2023 Cork Senior A Football Championship =

4th staging of the Cork Senior A Football Championship

- Dates: 28 July - 11 November 2023
- Teams: 12
- Sponsor: Bon Secours Hospital
- Champions: Newcestown (1st title); Luke Meade (captain); Tim Buckley (manager)
- Runners-up: Dohenys; Eoin Lavers (captain); Declan O'Dwyer (manager)
- Relegated: Ilen Rovers

Tournament statistics
- Matches played: 24
- Goals scored: 42 (1.75 per match)
- Points scored: 540 (22.5 per match)
- Top scorer(s): David Buckley (0-37)

The 2023 Cork Senior A Football Championship was the fourth staging of the Cork Senior A Football Championship since its establishment by the Cork County Board in 2020. The draw for the group stage placings took place on 11 December 2022. The championship ran from 28 July to 11 November 2023.

The final was played on 11 November 2023 at Páirc Uí Chaoimh in Cork, between Newcestown and Dohenys, in what was their first ever meeting in the final. Newcestown won the match by 0-13 to 0-08 to claim their first ever championship title. They were the first team to complete the double, having earlier claimed the Cork SAHC title.

Newcestown's David Buckley was the championship's top scorer with 0-37.

== Team changes ==
=== To Championship ===
Promoted from the Cork Premier Intermediate Football Championship

- Kanturk

Relegated from the Cork Premier Senior Football Championship

- Newcestown

=== From Championship ===
Promoted to the Cork Premier Senior Football Championship

- St. Michael's

Relegated to the Cork Premier Intermediate Football Championship

- Bandon

== Group A ==
=== Group A table ===
Knockout stage Relegation playoff

Team	Matches				Score			Pts
Team	Pld	W	D	L	For	Against	Diff	Pts
Knocknagree	3	2	0	1	45	40	5	4
Kanturk	3	2	0	1	59	55	4	4
O'Donovan Rossa	3	2	0	1	54	50	4	4
Fermoy	3	0	0	3	45	58	-13	0

=== Group A results ===
28 July 2023 Round 1	Kanturk	3-13 - 2-12	Fermoy	Mill Field
	I Walsh 0-4 (0-2 f), L McLoughlin, P Walsh, Alan Walsh 1-0 each, Aidan Walsh 0-3 (0-1 f), G Bucinskas, T Walsh, C Walsh 0-2 each.	Report	D Lardner 0-7 (0-3 f, 0-1 m), D O’Callaghan, D Daly 1-0 each, B Twomey 0-2 f, P De Roiste (f), J Molloy S Aherne 0-1 each.	Referee: J Regan (Lough Rovers)

29 July 2023 Round 1	Knocknagree	0-11 - 2-09	O'Donovan Rossa	Castle Grounds
	A O’Connor 0-5 (0-4 f, 0-1 mark), Denis O’Connor, M McSweeney 0-2 each, David O’Connor, J Dennehy 0-1 each.	Report	K Davis 0-4 f, D Óg Hodnett, T Hegarty 1-0 each, D Hourihane 0-2, R Byrne, S Fitzgerald, D Shannon 0-1 each.	Referee: C Walsh (Nemo Rangers)

19 August 2023 Round 2	Fermoy	0-11 - 1-14	Knocknagree	Newmarket Grounds
	D Lardner 0-8 (0-6 f); P De Roiste 0-3.	Report	A O’Connor 1-8 (0-7 f); M Mahoney, T O’Connor, David O’Connor, E McSweeney, Denis O’Connor, M Dilworth 0-1 each.	Referee: B Barry-Murphy (Aghabullogue)

20 August 2023 Round 2	O'Donovan Rossa	2-14 - 3-14	Kanturk	Castle Grounds
	K Davis (0-6, 0-5 frees), S Fitzgerald (1-2), J Shanahan (1-0), D Hourihane (0-3), K Hurley, R Byrne, B Crowley (0-1 each).	Report	C Walsh (1-6, 0-1 mark), I Walsh (1-5, 0-2 frees), A Walsh (1-0), L McLoughlin (0-2), R Cashman (0-1 45).	Referee: C Dineen (Douglas)

10 September 2023 Round 3	O'Donovan Rossa	3-10 - 1-13	Fermoy	Charlie Hurley Park
	R Bryne (1-2, 0-1 free); K Davis (0-4, 0-3 frees); N Daly (0-3); D Hourihane Snr (pen), T Hegarty (1-0 each); S Fitzgerald (0-1).	Report	D Lardner (0-5, 0-2 frees); P De Róise (0-4); D Daly (0-3); B O’Sullivan (1-0); D Dawson (0-1, 45).	Referee: P O'Mahony

10 September 2023 Round 3	Knocknagree	2-11 - 0-14	Kanturk	Dromtarriffe Grounds
	A O’Connor 0-4 (0-3 f), D O’Mahony, N O’Connor 1-0 each, D O’Connor 0-3, M Dilworth 0-2, E McSweeney, P Doyle (45) 0-1 each.	Report	I Walsh 0-7 (0-2 f), C Walsh, P Walsh 0-2 each, R Walsh, B O’Sullivan, G Bucinskas 0-1 each.	Referee: P O'Driscoll (Bride Rovers)

== Group B ==
=== Group B table ===
Knockout stage

Team	Matches				Score			Pts
Team	Pld	W	D	L	For	Against	Diff	Pts
Newmarket	3	2	1	0	47	34	13	5
Béal Átha'n Ghaorthaidh	3	1	1	1	42	42	0	3
Clyda Rovers	3	1	0	2	37	42	-5	2
Kiskeam	3	1	0	2	34	42	-8	2

=== Group B results ===
29 July 2023 Round 1	Clyda Rovers	1-11 - 0-15	Béal Átha'n Ghaorthaidh	Coachford Grounds
	C Corbett (1-5, 0-2 frees), E Walsh (0-2, 0-1 mark), N Hanley, C O’Sullivan, D O’Callaghan and P Kissane (0-1 each).	Report	B Seartan (0-8, 0-2 frees), C Ó Loingsigh (0-4, 0-2 frees, 0-1 45), A Ó Coinceannáin, S Ó Luasa and D Mac Tomáis (0-1 each).	Referee: A O'Connor (Ballygarvan)

29 July 2023 Round 1	Newmarket	0-15 - 1-08	Kiskeam	Kanturk Grounds
	R O’Keeffe (0-1 ’45) and C O’Keeffe (0-2 frees) (0-5 each), H O’Connor (0-3, 0-1 free), B O’Connor and P Allen (0-1 each)	Report	T Casey (1-3, 0-1 free, 0-1 ’45), S Sullivan (0-3, 0-2 frees), M Casey and AJ O’Connor (0-1 each).	Referee: J Murphy (Castletownroche)

19 August 2023 Round 2	Kiskeam	1-06 - 1-11	Clyda Rovers	Kanturk Grounds
	T Casey 1-2 (0-2 f), S O’Sullivan 0-2, D Fitzgerald (f), M Herlihy 0-1 each.	Report	C Corbett 0-5 (0-2 f), D O’Callaghan 0-4 f, K Graham 1-0, C O’Sullivan, D Walsh 0-1 each.	Referee: C Nolan (Bishopstown)

20 August 2023 Round 2	Béal Átha'n Ghaorthaidh	1-11 - 0-14	Newmarket	O'Connor-McLoughlin Memorial Park
	B Seartan (1-5); D Mac Tomáis (0-3, 2 frees); A Ó Coinceannáin (free), C Ó Loingsigh (free), D Seartan (0-1 each).	Report	H O’Connor (0-7, 6 frees); R O’Keeffe (0-3, 1 45); C O’Keeffe (0-2, 1 free); C Browne, D Hannon (0-1 each).	Referee: P O'Leary (Cloughduv)

10 September 2023 Round 3	Béal Átha'n Ghaorthaidh	0-13 - 1-11	Kiskeam	Millstreet Grounds
	C Ó Loingsigh 0-6 (0-1 f), D Seartan 0-4, B Seartan 0-2 (0-1 f), A Ó Coinceannáin 0-1.	Report	T Casey 0-5, K O Connor 1-0, S O'Sullivan, AJ O'Connor 0-2 each, T Dennehy, M Herlihy 0-1 each.	Referee: J Murphy (Castletownroche)

10 September 2023 Round 3	Clyda Rovers	0-09 - 1-15	Newmarket	Banteer Sportsfield
	D O’Callaghan (0-4, 0-3 frees, 0-1 ’45), E Walsh (0-2, 0-1 mark), C Corbett (free), C O’Sullivan and C Buckley (0-1 each).	Report	B O’Connor (1-3), H O’Connor (0-4, 0-3 frees), M Cottrell, R O’Keeffe (0-1 free) and C O’Keeffe (0-1 free) (0-2 each), D O’Keeffe and C Browne (0-1 each).	Referee: D Daly (Brian Dillons)

== Group C ==
=== Group C table ===
Knockout stage Relegation playoff

Team	Matches				Score			Pts
Team	Pld	W	D	L	For	Against	Diff	Pts
Dohenys	3	3	0	0	52	39	13	6
Newcestown	3	2	0	1	44	37	7	4
Bishopstown	3	1	0	2	44	47	-3	2
Ilen Rovers	3	0	0	3	44	51	-17	0

=== Group C results ===
29 July 2023 Round 1	Newcestown	0-08 - 0-09	Dohenys	Rossmore Grounds
	D Buckley (0-2 frees) and N Kelly (0-1 free) 0-3 each, S O’Donovan and R O’Sullivan 0-1 each.	Report	M Buckley 0-3 (0-3 frees), C O’Shea and F Herlihy 0-2 each, K White and A Mannix (0-1 45’) 0-1 each.	Referee: M Collins (Clonakilty)

30 July 2023 Round 1	Bishopstown	1-12 - 0-04	Ilen Rovers	Ahamilla Grounds
	B Clifford 0-5 (0-2 frees), K McFadden 1-1, C Dunne 0-2 (0-2 frees), M Murphy, P Honnohan, L O’Driscoll and S Collins 0-1 each.	Report	M Sheehy 0-2, P O’Driscoll and S O’Donovan 0-1 each.	Referee: B Sweeney (Shamrocks)

19 August 2023 Round 2	Ilen Rovers	1-09 - 0-14	Newcestown	Rossmore Grounds
	D Mac Eoin 0-4 (0-1 f), A Holland 0-3, C Harrington 1-0, S O’Donovan (f), M Sheehy 0-1 each.	Report	D Buckley 0-6 (0-4 f), N Kelly 0-4 (0-3 f), C Dineen 0-2, R O’Sullivan, E Kenneally 0-1 each.	Referee: A Long (Argideen Rangers)

20 August 2023 Round 2	Dohenys	2-15 - 1-10	Bishopstown	Charlie Hurley Park
	C O’Shea (0-6, 0-4 frees), S Barry (1-1), M Buckley (1-0), K White (0-3) R Coakley (frees) and F Herlihy (0-2 each), A Mannix (0-1).	Report	C Dunne (0-4, frees), N Gough (1-0), M Nunan (0-1 free) and S Collins (0-2 each), B Clifford (free) and K McFadden (0-1 each).	Referee: A O'Connor (Ballygarvan)

10 September 2023 Round 3	Dohenys	3-13 - 1-15	Ilen Rovers	Páirc Tadhg na Samhna
	K White 2-1, R Coakley 1-1, C O’Shea 0-4 (0-3 f), F Herlihy, M Buckley 0-3 each, S Barry 0-1.	Report	D Mac Eoin 0-8 (0-6 f), S O’Donovan 1-3, M Sheehy, A Holland 0-2 each.	Referee: C Dineen (Douglas)

10 September 2023 Round 3	Newcestown	1-19 - 2-10	Bishopstown	Cloughduv Grounds
	D Buckley (0-9, 5f), E Kenneally (1-2), T Twomey (0-4), R O’Sullivan (0-3), N Kelly (0-1, 1f).	Report	D O’Connor (2-0), S Collins (0-4), B Clifford (0-3, 3f), M Power, M Nunan and L Arslan (0-1 each).	Referee: P O'Leary (Cloughduv)

== Knockout stage ==
=== Bracket ===
Quarter-Finals
Kanturk	1-07
Newcestown	2-04p
Knocknagree	0-10
Béal Átha'n Ghaorthaidh	0-08

Semi-Finals
Newmarket	0-10
Newcestown	0-12
Dohenys	1-19
Knocknagree	2-12

Final
Newcestown	0-13
Dohenys	0-8

=== Relegation playoff ===
24 September 2023 Playoff	Fermoy	0-10 - 0-04	Ilen Rovers	Páirc Uinsinn
	G O’Callaghan 0-4, D Lardner 0-3 (0-2 f), D Dawson (f), M Brennan, B O’Sullivan 0-1 each.	Report	M Sheehan 0-2, S O’Shea, P O’Driscoll (f) 0-1 each.	Referee: A O'Connor (Ballygarvan)

=== Quarter-finals ===
23 September 2023 Quarter-final	Knocknagree	0-10 - 0-08	Béal Átha'n Ghaorthaidh	Clondrohid Grounds
	A O’Connor 0-3 (0-2f, 0-1 45), T O’Connor, Denis R O’Connor 0-2, David O’Connor, E McSweeney, M McSweeney 0-1 each.	Report	A Ó Coinceannáin (0-2f), C Ó Loingsigh, B Seartan (0-1f) 0-2 each, D Seartan, L Ó Conchúir 0-1 each.	Referee: C Murphy (Glanworth)

24 September 2023 Quarter-final	Kanturk	1-07 - 2-04; Penalties: 2-4	Newcestown	Coachford Grounds
	R Walsh, C Hendry 1-0 each, I Walsh 0-2 (0-1 f), C Mullane, L McLoughlin 0-1 each.	Report	D Buckley 0-5 (0-4 f), C Keane 1-0, L Meade, M McSweeney 0-1 each.	Referee: R Whelan (Aghada)

=== Semi-finals ===
7 October 2023 Semi-final	Dohenys	1-19 - 2-12	Knocknagree	Páirc Uí Chaoimh
	F Herlihy 0-8, C O’Shea 0-6 (0-5f), M Buckley 1-2 (0-1f), K White 0-3 (0-1f).	Report	A O’Connor 1-2 (0-2f), M McSweeney 0-3, Denis O’Connor 1-0, E McSweeney 0-2, N O’Connor, J Dennehy, P Doyle (0-1 45), T O’Connor, T O’Mahony 0-1 each.	Referee: D Murnane (Macroom)

7 October 2023 Semi-final	Newmarket	0-10 - 0-12	Newcestown	Páirc Uí Chaoimh
	C O’Keeffe 0-3 (0-2 f), D O’Keeffe, R O’Keeffe 0-2 each, TJ Brosnan, B O’Connor, H O’Connor 0-1 each.	Report	D Buckley 0-5 (0-2 f), T Twomey 0-3, S O’Sullivan 0-2, L Meade, N Kelly 0-1 each.	Referee: R Whelan (Gleann na Laoi)

=== Final ===
11 November 2023 Final	Dohenys	0-08 - 0-13	Newcestown	Páirc Uí Chaoimh
	C O’Shea (0-2 f), K White 0-3 each, J Kelly, G Farr 0-1 each.	Report	D Buckley 0-9 (0-3 f), J Meade 0-2 (0-1 m), T Twomey, N Kelly 0-1 each.	Referee: J Ryan (Macroom)

== Championship statistics ==
=== Top scorers ===
Overall

Rank	Player	County	Tally	Total	Matches	Average
1	David Buckley	Newcestown	0-37	37	6	6.16
2	Anthony O'Connor	Knocknagree	2-22	28	5	5.60
3	David Lardner	Fermoy	0-23	23	4	5.75
4	Ian Walsh	Kanturk	1-18	21	4	5.25
4	Colm O'Shea	Dohenys	0-21	21	5	4.20
6	Ben Seartan	Béal Átha'n Ghaorthaidh	1-17	20	4	5.00
7	Keith White	Dohenys	2-11	17	5	3.40
8	Thomas Casey	Kiskeam	2-10	16	3	5.33
9	Hugh O'Connor	Newmarket	0-15	15	4	3.75
10	Mark Buckley	Dohenys	2-08	14	5	2.80
10	Conor Corbett	Clyda Rovers	1-11	14	3	4.66
10	Kevin Davis	O'Donovan Rossa	0-14	14	3	4.66

In a single game

Rank	Player	Club	Tally	Total	Opposition
1	Anthony O'Connor	Knocknagree	1-08	11	Fermoy
2	Colin Walsh	Kanturk	1-06	9	O'Donovan Rossa
2	David Buckley	Newcestown	0-09	9	Bishopstown
2	David Buckley	Newcestown	0-09	9	Dohenys
5	Conor Corbett	Clyda Rovers	1-05	8	Béal Átha'n Ghaorthaidh
5	Ben Seartan	Béal Átha'n Ghaorthaidh	1-05	8	Newmarket
5	Ian Walsh	Kanturk	1-05	8	O'Donovan Rossa
5	Ben Seartan	Béal Átha'n Ghaorthaidh	0-08	8	Clyda Rovers
5	Dan Mac Eoin	Ilen Rovers	0-08	8	Dohenys
5	David Lardner	Fermoy	0-08	8	Knocknagree
5	Fionn Herlihy	Dohenys	0-08	8	Knocknagree
