= Conor Corbett =

Irish Gaelic footballer

Personal information
- Native name: Conchúr Ó Coirbín (Irish)
- Born: 1 March 2001 (age 25) Cork, Ireland
- Occupation: Student

Sport
- Sport: Gaelic football
- Position: Centre-forward
Club
- Years: Club
- 2020-present: Clyda Rovers
Club titles
- Cork titles: 0
College
- Years: College
- DCU Dóchas Éireann
College titles
- Sigerson titles: 0
Inter-county
Years	County	Apps (scores)
2022-present	Cork	16 (2-06)
Inter-county titles
- Munster titles: 0
- All-Irelands: 0
- NFL: 0
- All Stars: 0

Conor Corbett (born 1 March 2001) is an Irish Gaelic footballer who plays for Cork SAFC club Clyda Rovers and at inter-county level with the Cork senior football team. He usually lines out as a forward.

== Career ==
Corbett played Gaelic football at school level with the Patrician Academy in Mallow. He won several titles with the school throughout 2019 and 2020, including the Simcox Cup. Corbett also lined out at juvenile and underage levels with the Clyda Rovers club before making his senior team debut in 2020.

Corbett first lined out at inter-county level as captain of the Cork minor football team that beat Galway in the 2019 All-Ireland minor final. Corbett was subsequently named Minor Footballer of the Year. He was included on the Cork under-20 football team in 2020 and 2021, however, his progress onto the senior team was stalled after suffering a cruciate ligament injury. Corbett was included on the senior team's training panel in 2022.

== Career statistics ==
=== Club ===
As of 14 September 2025

Team	Year	Cork SAFC	
Team	Year	Apps	Score
Clyda Rovers	2020	3	0-13
Clyda Rovers	2021	0	0-00
Clyda Rovers	2022	4	1-06
Clyda Rovers	2023	3	1-11
Clyda Rovers	2024	0	0-00
Clyda Rovers	2025	3	2-17
Total		13	4-47

=== Inter-county ===
As of 13 June 2026

Team	Year	National League			Munster		All-Ireland		Total	
Team	Year	Division	Apps	Score	Apps	Score	Apps	Score	Apps	Score
Cork	2022	Division 2	0	0-00	0	0-00	0	0-00	0	0-00
Cork	2023	Division 2	6	2-05	1	0-00	4	1-01	11	3-06
Cork	2024	Division 2	4	2-07	2	0-03	4	0-01	10	2-11
Cork	2025	Division 2	0	0-00	0	0-00	0	0-00	0	0-00
Cork	2026	Division 2	1	0-00	3	1-00	2	0-01	6	1-01
Total			11	4-12	6	1-03	10	1-03	27	6-18

== Honours ==
Patrician Academy

- Simcox Cup: 2019
- Munster Colleges Senior B Football Championship: 2020

Cork

- Munster Under-20 Football Championship: 2021
- All-Ireland Minor Football Championship: 2019 (c)

Sporting positions
Preceded by Diarmuid Phelan	Cork minor football team captain 2019	Succeeded by Eoghan Nash
Achievements
Preceded by Paul O'Shea	All-Ireland Minor Football Final winning captain 2019	Succeeded by Matthew Downey
Achievements
Preceded by Paul Walsh	GAA Minor Star Footballer of the Year; 2019	Succeeded by Matthew Downey
