= Shane Merritt =

Irish Gaelic footballer

Personal information
- Native name: Seán Meirit (Irish)
- Born: Mallow, County Cork, Ireland
- Occupation: Student

Sport
- Sport: Gaelic Football
- Position: Centre-back
Club
- Years: Club
- Mallow
Club titles
- Cork titles: 0
College
- Years: College
- 2019-present: University College Cork
College titles
- Sigerson titles: 0
Inter-county*
Years	County	Apps (scores)
2022-	Cork	0 (0-00)
Inter-county titles
- Munster titles: 0
- All-Irelands: 0
- NFL: 0
- All Stars: 0
- *Inter County team apps and scores correct as of 18:19, 29 January 2022.

Shane Merritt is an Irish Gaelic footballer who plays at club level with Mallow and at inter-county level with the Cork senior football team. He usually lines out as a centre-back.

== Career ==
Merritt first played competitive Gaelic football with the Mallow club, while also lining out for divisional side Avondhu in various juvenile and underage competitions. He claimed his first silverware at club level when he lined out at centre-back when Mallow beat St. Michael's in the 2021 Cork SAFC final. Merritt first appeared on the inter-county scene when he was selected for the Cork senior football team for the pre-season McGrath Cup competition in 2022. He later earned inclusion on the team's National League panel.

== Career statistics ==
As of match played 29 January 2022.

Team	Year	National League			Munster		All-Ireland		Total	
Team	Year	Division	Apps	Score	Apps	Score	Apps	Score	Apps	Score
Cork	2022	Division 2	0	0-00	0	0-00	0	0-00	0	0-00
Total			0	0-00	0	0-00	0	0-00	0	0-00

== Honours ==
Mallow

- Cork Senior A Football Championship: 2021
