= Robbie Cotter =

Irish hurler

Personal information
- Born: 2001 (age 24–25) Blackrock, Cork, Ireland
- Occupation: Student
- Height: 6 ft 0 in (183 cm)

Sport
- Sport: Hurling
- Position: Left corner-forward
Clubs*
Years	Club	Apps (scores)
2019-present 2019-present	Blackrock; St Michael's	22 (10-48); 2 (0-04)
Club titles
- Cork titles: 1
College
- Years: College
- University College Cork
College titles
- Fitzgibbon titles: 0
Inter-county**
Years	County	Apps (scores)
2024-	Cork	0 (0-00)
Inter-county titles
- Munster titles: 0
- All-Irelands: 0
- NHL: 1
- All Stars: 0
- * club appearances and scores correct as of 21:31, 2 August 2024. **Inter County team apps and scores correct as of 21:31, 14 January 2024.

Robbie Cotter (born 2001) is an Irish hurler and Gaelic footballer. At club level he plays with Blackrock and St Michael's and at inter-county level with the Cork senior hurling team.

== Career ==
Cotter first played hurling at juvenile and underage levels with the Blackrock club. He later played as a schoolboy with Christian Brothers College in the Harty Cup before attending University College Cork (UCC). Cotter was part of the UCC team that won the Canon O'Brien Cup in 2024.

After progressing from the underage grades, Cotter first played at adult club level with the Blackrock intermediate team in 2019. He won a Cork IHC medal that year before later being promoted to the club's senior team. Cotter was part of the Blackrock team that beat Glen Rovers to win the Cork PSHC title in 2020. He has also enjoyed success as a Gaelic footballer with sister club St Michael's. Cotter won a City JAFC medal in 2019, before collecting a Cork SAFC medal in 2022.

Cotter first appeared on the inter-county scene with Cork during a two-year stint with the under-20 team. After claiming an All-Ireland U20HC title as a member of the extended panel in 2020, he collected a winners' medal on the field of play the following year. Cotter had been close to the senior team over the following few seasons before making his debut in the pre-season Munster SHL in 2024.

== Honours ==
St Michael's

- Cork Senior A Football Championship: 2022
- City Junior A Football Championship: 2019

Blackrock

- Cork Premier Senior Hurling Championship: 2020
- Cork Intermediate Hurling Championship: 2019

Cork

- National Hurling League: 2025
- All-Ireland Under-20 Hurling Championship: 2020, 2021
- Munster Under-20 Hurling Championship: 2020, 2021
