= Cork Senior A Football Championship =

- Current season or competition: 2025 Cork Senior A Football Championship
- Irish: Craobh Peile Sinsearach A Chorcaí
- Code: Gaelic football
- Founded: 2020; 6 years ago
- Region: Cork (GAA)
- Trophy: Kevin McTernan Cup
- No. of teams: 12
- Title holders: Carrigaline (1st title)
- Most titles: Various teams (1 titles)
- Sponsors: McCarthy Insurance Group
- Official website: Cork GAA

The Cork Senior A Football Championship (known for sponsorship reasons as McCarthy Insurance Group Cork County Senior A Football Championship and abbreviated to the Cork SAFC) is an annual club Gaelic football competition organised by the Cork County Board of the Gaelic Athletic Association from 2020 for the second tier senior Gaelic football teams in the county of Cork in Ireland.

In its current format, the Cork Senior A Championship begins in early autumn. The 12 participating club teams are divided into three groups of four teams and play each other in a round-robin system. The three group winners and the three runners-up proceed to the knockout phase that culminates with the final match at Páirc Uí Chaoimh.

Five clubs have won the championship. Carrigaline are the title holders after beating Knocknagree by 0–16 to 1–11 in the 2024 final.

== History ==
=== Development ===
On 26 March 2019, three championship proposals were circulated to Cork club delegates after an expensive review process of the entire Cork championship system. A core element running through all three proposals, put together by the Cork GAA games workgroup, was that there be a group stage of 12 teams, as well as straight relegation and promotion. On 2 April 2019, a majority of 136 club delegates voted for Option A which provided for one round of games played in April and two more in August – all with inter-county players available. The decision meant that, for the first time since 1887, the top tier of Cork football was split in two into the Cork Premier Senior Championship and the Cork Senior A Championship.

=== Beginnings ===
The inaugural championship was scheduled to begin in April 2020, however, it was postponed indefinitely due to the coronavirus pandemic in Ireland. When the championship resumed, time constraints led to a revision of the format, with the play-offs for the second best and third best third placed teams being abolished. The knockout stage was further reduced, with the two best-ranking teams from the group stage receiving byes to the semi-finals and the other four qualifying teams contesting two lone quarter-finals. The very first match eventually took place on 24 July 2020, with Bandon claiming a 1-12 to 0-06 victory over Clyda Rovers. Bandon's Mark O'Regan scored the very first championship point before later scoring the championship's very first goal.

== Regular format ==
=== Group stage ===
The 12 teams are divided into three groups of four. Over the course of the group stage, which features one game in April and two games in August, each team plays once against the others in the group, resulting in each team being guaranteed at least three games. Two points are awarded for a win, one for a draw and zero for a loss. The teams are ranked in the group stage table by points gained, then scoring difference and then their head-to-head record. The top two teams in each group qualify for the knock-out stage.

=== Knockout stage ===
Play-off: The second best and third best third placed teams from the group stage play off for last quarter-final place.

Quarter-finals: The play-off winner and the seven top-ranking teams from the group stage contest this round. The four winners from these four games advance to the semi-finals.

Semi-finals: The four quarter-final winners contest this round. The two winners from these four games advance to the semi-finals.

Final: The two semi-final winners contest the final. The winning team are declared champions.

=== Promotion and relegation ===
At the end of the championship, the winning team is automatically promoted to the Cork Premier Senior Championship for the following season. The three bottom-placed teams from the group stage take part in a series of play-offs, with the losing team being relegated to the Cork Premier Intermediate Championship.

== Teams ==
=== 2027 Teams ===
The 12 teams due to compete in the 2027 Cork Senior A Football Championship are:

Team	Location	Division	Colours	Position in 2026	In championship since	Championship titles	Last championship title
Aghabullogue	Coachford	Muskerry	Green and white	Group stage	2026	0	—
Béal Átha'n Ghaorthaidh	Ballingeary	Muskerry	Black and red	Quarter-finals	2020	0	—
Bishopstown	Bishopstown	Seandún	Maroon and white	Group stage	2021	0	—
Carbery Rangers	Rosscarbery	Carbery	Green, white and gold hoops	Semi-finals	2026	0	—
Cill Na Martra	Kilnamartyra	Muskerry	Blue and white	Semi-finals	2024	0	—
Clyda Rovers	Mourne Abbey	Avondhu	Black and yellow	Group stage	2020	0	—
Dohenys	Dunmanway	Carbery	Green and white	Group stage	2020	0	—
Éire Óg	Ovens	Muskerry	Red and yellow	Runners-up	2025	1	2020
Kilshannig	Glantane	Avondhu	Blue and yellow	Quarter-finals	2025	0	—
Newmarket	Newmarket	Duhallow	Red and black	Group stage	2022	0	—
St Michael's	Blackrock	Seandún	Green and gold	Premier Senior relegated	2027	1	2022
Uíbh Laoire	Inchigeelagh	Muskerry	Red and white	Premier Intermediate champions	2027	0	—

== Sponsorship ==
In July 2020, Bon Secours Hospital were unveiled as the title sponsor of the Cork Senior A Championship. McCarthy Insurance Group became the new title sponsor in December 2023.

== Trophy and medals ==
The Kevin McTernan Cup is the current prize for winning the championship. It was donated in June 2021 to honour Kevin McTernan who served as a St Finbarr's player and selector. Daniel Goulding of Éire Óg was the first recipient of the cup when it was presented to him after the 2020 final.

Traditionally, at Páirc Uí Chaoimh, the victory presentation takes place at a special rostrum in the main grandstand. The cup is decorated with ribbons in the colours of the winning team. During the game the cup actually has both teams' sets of ribbons attached and the runners-up ribbons are removed before the presentation. The winning captain accepts the cup on behalf of his team before giving a short speech. Individual members of the winning team then have an opportunity to come to the rostrum to lift the cup, which is held by the winning team until the following year's final.

In accordance with GAA rules, the County Board awards a set of gold medals to the championship winners. The medals depict a stylised version of the Cork GAA crest.

== List of finals ==
=== List of Cork SAFC finals ===
Year	Winners		Runners-up		Winning captain(s)	Venue	#
Year	Club	Score	Club	Score	Winning captain(s)	Venue	#
2026	Kanturk	1–15	Éire Óg	0–14	Paul Walsh	Páirc Uí Chaoimh	
2025	Knocknagree	2–17	Cill Na Martra	0–17	Anthony O’Connor	Páirc Uí Chaoimh	
2024	Carrigaline	0–16	Knocknagree	1–11	Jack McCarthy	Páirc Uí Chaoimh	
2023	Newcestown	0–13	Dohenys	0–08	Luke Meade	Páirc Uí Chaoimh	
2022	St. Michael's	2–07	Knocknagree	0–06	Seán Keating; Tom Lenihan	Páirc Uí Chaoimh	
2021	Mallow	2–12	St. Michael's	0–15	Eoin Stanton	Páirc Uí Chaoimh	
2020	Éire Óg	2–13	Mallow	1–07	Daniel Goulding	Páirc Uí Chaoimh	

== Roll of honour ==
=== By club ===
#	Club	Titles	Runners-up	Championships won	Championships runner-up
1	Mallow	1	1	2021	2020
1	St. Michael's	1	1	2022	2021
1	Éire Óg	1	0	2020	—
1	Newcestown	1	0	2023	—
1	Carrigaline	1	0	2024	—
5	Knocknagree	0	2	—	2022, 2024
5	Dohenys	0	1	—	2023

=== By Division ===
Division	Titles	Runners-Up	Total
Avondhu	1	1	2
Carbery	1	1	2
Seandun	1	1	2
Carrigdhoun	1	0	1
Muskerry	1	0	1
Duhallow	0	2	2
Beara	0	0	0
Imokilly	0	0	0

== Records and statistics ==
=== Top scorers ===
==== All time ====
As of As of match played 1 November 2026

Rank	Player	Club	Score	Total
1	Kevin Davis	O'Donovan Rossa	3-118	127
2	Ben Seartan	Béal Átha'n Ghaorthaidh	6-88	106
3	Anthony O'Connor	Knocknagree	8-71	95
4	Keith White	Dohenys	4-82	94
5	Grantas Buckinskas	Kanturk	5-75	90
6	Mark Buckley	Dohenys	5-68	83
7	Daniel Goulding	Éire Óg	2-69	75
8	Conor Dunne	Bishopstown	5-51	66
9	Conor Corbett	Clyfa Rovers	5-50	65
9	Diarmuid Mac Thomáis	Béal Átha'n Ghaorthaidh	3-56	65

==== By year ====
Year	Top scorer	Team	Score	Total
2020	Daniel Goulding	Éire Óg	2-34	40
2021	Mark Buckley	Dohenys	1-24	27
2022	Kevin Davis	O'Donovan Rossa	0-31	31
2023	David Buckley	Newcestown	0-37	37
2024	Anthony O'Connor	Knocknagree	4-20	32
2025	Anthony O'Connor	Knocknagree	2-29	35
2026	Grantas Bucinskas	Kanturk	4-29	41

==== In a single game ====
Year	Top scorer	Team	Score	Total
2020	Daniel Goulding	Éire Óg	2-07	13
2021	Mark Buckley	Dohenys	0-10	10
2022	Ryan O'Keeffe	Newmarket	4-03	15
2023	Anthony O'Connor	Knocknagree	1-08	11

==== In finals ====
Final	Top scorer	Team	Score	Total
2020	Joe Cooper	Éire Óg	1-02	5
2020	Dylan Foley	Éire Óg	1-02	5
2021	Tadhg Deasy	St. Michael's	0-08	8
2022	Adam Hennessy	St. Michael's	2-01	7
2023	David Buckley	Newcestown	0-09	9

== See also ==
- Cork Premier Senior Football Championship
