= 2026 Cork Senior A Football Championship =

Annual hurling competition season

- Dates: 22 July – 1 November 2026
- Teams: 12
- Sponsor: McCarthy Insurance Group
- Champions: Kanturk (1st title); Paul Walsh (captain); Eoghain O'Connor (manager)
- Runners-up: Éire Óg; Mark Griffin (captain); Eoin Fehily (manager)
- Relegated: O'Donovan Rossa

Tournament statistics
- Matches played: 24
- Goals scored: 50 (2.08 per match)
- Points scored: 709 (29.54 per match)
- Top scorer: Grantas Bucinskas (4-29)

The 2026 Cork Senior A Football Championship was the seventh staging of the Cork Senior A Football Championship since its establishment by the Cork County Board in 2020. The draw for the group stage placings took place on 9 December 2025. The championship ran from 22 July to 1 November 2026.

O'Donovan Rossa's relegation brought an end to 41 years of senior status for the club.

The final was played on 1 November 2026 at SuperValu Páirc Uí Chaoimh in Cork, between Kanturk and Éire Óg, in what was their first ever meeting in the final. Kanturk won the match by 1-15 to 0-14 to claim their first ever championship title.

Kanturk's Grantas Bucinskas was the championship's top scorer with 4-29.

== Team changes ==
=== To Championship ===
Relegated from the Cork Premier Senior Football Championship

- Carbery Rangers

Promoted from the Cork Premier Intermediate Football Championship

- Aghabullogue

=== From Championship ===
Promoted to the Cork Premier Senior Football Championship

- Knocknagree

Relegated to the Cork Premier Intermediate Football Championship

- Fermoy

== Group 1 ==
=== Group 1 table ===
Quarter-finalist

Team	Matches				Score			Pts
Team	Pld	W	D	L	For	Against	Diff	Pts
Kanturk	3	1	2	0	52	41	11	4
Béal Átha'n Ghaorth.	3	2	0	1	52	52	0	4
Aghabullogue	3	0	2	1	50	54	-4	2
Dohenys	3	0	2	1	48	55	-7	2

=== Group 1 results ===
25 July 2026 Round 1	Béal Átha'n Ghaorthaidh	0-11 - 1-19	Kanturk	Páirc Dhónaill Uí Cheallacháin
	B Seartan 0-3 (1 2pt, 0-1 f), D Seartan 0-3 (0-1 f), D O Coill 0-2 (2pt f), D Mac Thaomais, C O Loinsigh, E O Ceilleachair 0-1 each.	Report	G Bucinskas 1-4 (1 2pt), C Walsh 0-4, A Walsh (0-1 f), I Walsh (1 2pt), P Walsh, D O’Connell 0-2 each, R Cashman (45), L O’Keeffe, C Clernon 0-1 each.

25 July 2026 Round 1	Dohenys	2-13 - 1-16	Aghabullogue	Kilmichael Grounds
	K White 0-7 (0-5f), S Barry 1-1, A O’Donovan 1-0, F Herlihy (2pt), K McCarthy 0-2 each, R Coakley 0-1.	Report	M Bradley 1-5 (1 2ptf 0-2f), C O’Sullivan 0-4, J Corkery (2pt), K Casey 0-2 each, P O’Sullivan, P Ring, A O’Sullivan 0-1 each.

16 August 2026 Round 2	Aghabullogue	1-14 - 2-15	Béal Átha'n Ghaorthaidh	Castle Grounds
	M Bradley 1-4 (1 2pt f, 0-1 45), J Corkery (0-1 f), L Casey 0-3 each, C O’Sullivan 0-2, S Tarrant, P O’Sullivan 0-1 each.	Report	B Seartan 1-7 (2 2pt), Diarmuid Ó Ceallacháin 1-1, S Ó Tuama 0-5 (2 2pt), C Ó Loinsigh 0-2 (1 2pt).

16 August 2026 Round 2	Kanturk	2-10 - 1-13	Dohenys	Kilmurry Grounds
	G Bucinskas 1-4 (0-2 f), P Walsh 1-2, C Clernon, C Walsh, L O’Keeffe, T Walsh 0-1 each.	Report	S Murphy 1-2, S Daly 0-4 (2 tpf), K White 0-3, G Farr 0-2 (1 tp), F Herlihy, K McCarthy 0-1 each.

13 September 2026 Round 3	Béal Átha'n Ghaorthaidh	1-17 - 1-10	Dohenys	Páirc Mhíchíl
	S Ó Tuama 0-6, É Ó Céilleachair 1-1, D Ó Coill 0-4, C Ó Loingsigh 0-3, D Seartan 0-2, S Ó Donnchú 0-1.		S Murphy 1-0, G Farr 0-3, K White 0-3, S Daly 0-2, S Barry 0-1, E Lavers 0-1.

13 September 2026 Round 3	Kanturk	2-08 - 1-11	Aghabullogue	Castle Grounds
	G Bucinkas (1-5, 1tpf, 1tp, 1f), D O’Connell (1-0), T Walsh , C Walsh and B Healy (0-1 each).	Report	L Casey (1-4, 1tp), M Bradley (0-3, 2f), A O’Sullivan (0-2), E O’Sullivan and P O’Sullivan (0-1 each).

== Group 2 ==
=== Group 2 table ===
Semi-finalist Quarter-finalist Relegation playoff

Team	Matches				Score			Pts
Team	Pld	W	D	L	For	Against	Diff	Pts
Carbery Rangers	3	2	0	1	68	54	14	4
Cill na Martra	3	2	0	1	62	49	13	4
Newmarket	3	2	0	1	55	58	-3	4
O'Donovan Rossa (R)	3	0	0	3	49	73	-24	0

=== Group 2 results ===
26 July 2026 Round 1	Cill na Martra	2-19 - 0-22	Carbery Rangers	Sam Maguire Park
	D Ó Duinnín, M Ó Deasúna (2 2ptf, 1 2pt) 0-6 each, S Ó Duinnín 2-1, C Ó Duinnín 0-5, A Ó Cuana 0-1.	Report	P Hodnett 0-9 (2 2pt, 1 2ptf, 0-2 f), D Hayes 0-6 (2 2pt), T Cullinane (2pt), J O’Rourke (2pt), B Hodnett 0-2 each, P O’Rourke 0-1.

26 July 2026 Round 1	O'Donovan Rossa	1-19 - 0-26	Newmarket	Castle Grounds
	K Davis 0-12 (3 tpf, 1 tp, 0-3 f), D Hourihane Snr 1-0, D Shannon, T Hegarty 0-2 each, N Daly, C O’Driscoll 0-1 each.	Report	H O’Connor 0-8 (2 tp, 0-1 f), D O’Keeffe (1 tp), R O’Keeffe (0-2 f, 0-1 45) 0-4 each, C Browne (1 tp), B O’Connor 0-3 each, A Browne, R Lynn, D Cottrell, B O’Keeffe 0-1 each.

15 August 2026 Round 2	Carbery Rangers	1-21 - 2-09	O'Donovan Rossa	The Black Field
	D O’Neill 1-6, D Hayes 0-5 (0-1f), M Hodnett 0-4 (1 2pt, 0-1f), J O’Rourke 0-3, P Hurley 0-2, S Lenihan 0-1.	Report	Dylan Hourihane Snr 1-5 (1-3f, 1 2pt), Dylan Hourihane Jnr 1-1, E Connolly, S Fitzgerald, L O’Sullivan 0-1 each.

16 August 2026 Round 2	Newmarket	0-15 - 1-11	Cill na Martra	Clondrohid Grounds
	R O’Keeffe 0-8 (2 tpf, 2 45, 0-1 f), H O’Connor 0-4 (0-1 tp), D O’Keeffe 0-2, R Lynn 0-1.	Report	S Ó Fóirréidh 1-1, S Ó Duinnín 0-4 (0-2 f), D Ó Duinnín 0-3, D Mac Lochlainn 0-2, C Ó Duinnín 0-1.

13 September 2026 Round 3	Carbery Rangers	1-19 - 2-08	Newmarket	Carrigadrohid Grounds
	D Hayes (1-5), P Hodnett (0-6, 4f), D O’Neill (0-4), J O’Rourke, P Hurley, K Scannell, T Cullinane (0-1 each).	Report	C Browne (2-0), R O’Keeffe (0-3, 1f 1tp), H O’Connor (0-2, 2f), A Browne, B O’Keeffe, D O’Keeffe (0-1 each).

13 September 2026 Round 3	Cill na Martra	1-20 - 2-06	O'Donovan Rossa	St Mary's Park
	S Ó Duinnín 1-5 (0-2 f); D Ó Conaill 0-5 (1-2pt); C Ó Duinnín, S Ó Fóirreidh, D Ó Duinnín (0-2 each); J Ó Loingsigh, T Ó Corcora, A Ó Cuana (0-1 each).	Report	E Connolly 1-1; D Shannon 1-0; L O’Sullivan 0-2 (0-2 f); T Hegarty, L Harte, N Daly (0-1 each).

== Group 3 ==
=== Group 3 table ===
Semi-finalist Quarter-finalist Relegation playoff

Team	Matches				Score			Pts
Team	Pld	W	D	L	For	Against	Diff	Pts
Éire Óg	2	2	0	0	42	20	22	4
Kilshannig	2	2	0	0	50	30	20	4
Bishopstown	2	0	0	2	27	46	-19	0
Clyda Rovers	2	0	0	2	23	46	-23	0

=== Group 3 results ===
22 July 2026 Round 1	Clyda Rovers	2-11 - 2-13	Kilshannig	Dr Mannix Sportsfield
	C Corbett 1-3 (1 2pt f, 0-1 f), C Walsh 0-3, C Cooney 1-0, P O’Grady, K Coffey (45), A Kelly, D Cooney, C O’Sullivan 0-1 each.	Report	Darragh O’Sullivan 1-5 (2 2pt f, 0-1 f), A O’Connell 1-1, Diarmuid O’Sullivan 0-2, M Murphy, C O’Shea, J Twomey, K O’Hanlon, T Cunningham 0-1 each.	Referee: P O’Driscoll (Bride Rovers)

24 July 2026 Round 1	Bishopstown	1-11 - 0-15	Éire Óg	Páirc Uí Chonchúir
	C Dunne 0-5 (1 2pt f, 0-3 f), G Holland 0-3, S Collins 1-0, K McFadden, O Foley, P Casey 0-1 each.	Report	D Goulding 0-5 (2 2p f, 0-1 f), M Griffin 0-3 (1 2pt), J Murphy, C O’Callaghan 0-2 each, B Thompson, C McGoldrick, O O’Shea 0-1 each.

15 August 2026 Round 2	Kilshannig	2-25 - 0-13	Bishopstown	Mallow GAA Complex
	A O’Connell (1-3), T Cunningham (1-2), Darragh O’Sullivan (0-1 free), J Twomey, K Twomey (1 2pt) and J O’Hanlon (0-3 each), K O’Hanlon (2pt free) and M Murphy (0-2), E Healy, C O’Shea, D O’Doherty and Diarmuid O’Sullivan (0-1 each).	Report	G Holland (0-5, 0-2 frees), K McFadden (0-4), C Dunne (0-2 pt), K Murphy and H Wixted (0-1 each).

30 August 2026 Round 2	Clyda Rovers	1-03 - 2-21	Éire Óg	Grenagh Grounds
	C O’Sullivan 1-1, K Graham, B Nyhan 0-1 each.	Report	D Goulding 0-8 (2 2pt f, 0-4 f), J Kelleher 1-1, B Thompson 1-0, C McGoldrick (1 2pt), C O’Callaghan 0-3 each, J Murphy, C Clifford, D Clifford 0-2 each, R O’Toole 0-1.

13 September 2026 Round 3	Bishopstown	2-14 - 0-13	Clyda Rovers	Páirc Uí Rinn
	G Holland 0-5 (0-1 f), O Foley 1-1, B McCarthy 1-0, C Dunne (1 2pt), K McFadden, S Collins 0-2 each, H Wixted, K Murphy 0-1 each.	Report	K Coffey (1 2pt f, 0-1 45), D Walsh (1 2pt) 0-3 each, C Walsh (1 2pt), C O’Sullivan 0-2 each, A Kelly, C Flanagan (f), B Nyhan 0-1 each.

13 September 2026 Round 3	Éire Óg	0-24 - 0-09	Kilshannig	Grenagh Grounds
	J Murphy 0-5, C O'Callaghan 0-5, D Goulding 0-4, C McGoldrick 0-3, C Murphy 0-2, B Thompson 0-2, J Galvin 0-1, C Kelly 0-1, J Kelleher 0-1.		Darragh O'Sullivan 0-3, A O'Connell 0-2, J Twomey 0-2, J O'Hanlon 0-1, D Doherty 0-1.

== Relegation stage ==
=== Relegation final ===
26 September 2026 Relegation final	Clyda Rovers	1-16 - 0-13	O'Donovan Rossa	Tom Creedon Park
	C Walsh 0-5 (2 2pt), B Nyhan 1-1, K Graham 0-3, A Kelly, D Walsh (2pt) 0-2 each, C O’Sullivan (0-1f), C Cooney, D Cooney 0-1 each.	Report	Dylan Hourihane 0-5 (1 2ptf), D Shannon 0-3, L O’Sullivan 0-2, D Tobin (0-1 45), N Daly, L Harte 0-1 each.

== Knockout stage ==
=== Quarter-finals ===
26 September 2026 Quarter-final	Cill na Martra	1-16 - 0-12	Béal Átha'n Ghaorthaidh	Páirc Naomh Abán
	S Ó Duinnín (1-4, 1-3 frees); M Ó Deasúna (tp free), A Ó Cuana (0-2 each); C Ó Cróinín, S Ó Fóirréidh, C Ó Fóirréidh, C Ó Duinnín, P Ó h-Éalaithe, D Mac Lochlainn, T Ó Corcora, D Ó hUrdail (0-1 each).	Report	L Mac Thomáis (0-3, 0-1 free); D Ó Coill (tp free), D Seartan, C Ó Loingsigh (0-2 each); D Ó Briain, S Ó Tuama, É Ó Céilleachair (0-1 each).

27 September 2026 Quarter-final	Kanturk	2-16 - 0-19	Kilshannig	Fr Kelleher Park
	G Bucinskas 1-5 (1 tpf, 0-2 f), P Walsh 0-4 (2 tp), M Healy 1-0, A Walsh 0-3 (1 tp, 0-1 m), D O’Connell 0-2, B O’Sullivan, C Walsh 0-1 each.	Report	J Twomey (2 tp), D O’Sullivan (2 tpf, 0-1 f) 0-5 each, K Twomey 0-4 (2 tp), E O’Hanlon 0-2 (tp), E Healy, C O’Sullivan, D O’Doherty 0-1 each.

=== Semi-finals ===
10 October 2026 Semi-final	Éire Óg	2-16 - 1-16	Cill na Martra	Coachford Sportsfield
	J Galvin 1-3, D Goulding 0-6 (0-4 f, 1 2pt f), M Brady 1-0, J Murphy, C Clifford 0-2 each, J Kelleher, B Thompson, O O’Shea 0-1 each.	Report	M Ó Deasuna 0-4 (2 2pt f), S Ó Foirreadh (1 2pt), M Ó Duinnin (1 2pt) 0-3 each, C Ó Duinnin 1-0, T Ó Corcora, D Ó Duinnin, S Ó Duinnin (f) 0-2 each.

11 October 2026 Semi-final	Carbery Rangers	1-14 - 1-18 (aet)	Kanturk	Tom Creedon Park
	P Hodnett 1-7 (1 2pt, 1 2pt f, 0-1 f), D O’Neill (1 2pt), J O’Rourke 0-2 each, S Linehan, K Scannell, D Hayes 0-1 each.	Report	G Bucinskas 0-7 (0-2 f, 0-1 45, 0-1 ), P Walsh 0-3 (1 2pt), C Walsh 1-0, D O’Connell 0-2, L McLoughlin, A Walsh, J Fitzpatrick, B O’Sullivan, C Clernon, I Walsh 0-1 each.

=== Final ===
1 November 2026 Final	Éire Óg	0-14 - 1-15	Kanturk	SuperValu Páirc Uí Chaoimh
	D Goulding 0-3 (0-2 f), C Clifford, C O’Callaghan 0-2 each, D Clifford, D McCarthy, J Kelleher, B Thompson, C McGoldrick, R O’Toole, J Galvin 0-1 each.	Report	P Walsh 1-2, G Bucinskas 0-4 (1 2pt f), T Walsh (1 2pt), I Walsh (1 2pt) 0-2 each, B O’Sullivan, C Walsh, L O’Keefe, A Walsh, C Clernon 0-1 each.

== Championship statistics ==
=== Top scorers ===
Rank	Player	Club	Tally	Total	Matches	Average
1	Grantas Bucinskas	Kanturk	4-29	41	6	6.83
2	Shane Ó Duinnín	Cill na Martra	4-16	28	5	5.60
3	Daniel Goulding	Éire Óg	0-26	27	5	5.40
4	Paul Hodnett	Carbery Rangers	1-22	25	3	8.33
5	Daragh Hayes	Carbery Rangers	1-17	20	4	5.00
6	Paul Walsh	Kanturk	2-13	19	6	3.16
6	Darragh O'Sullivan	Kilshannig	1-16	19	3	4.75
8	Matthew Bradley	Aghabullogue	2-12	18	3	6.00
9	Dylan Hourihane Snr	O'Donovan Rossa	2-10	16	4	4.00
10	Dylan O'Neill	Carbery Rangers	1-12	15	4	3.75
10	Ryan O'Keeffe	Newmarket	0-15	15	3	5.00
