= 2024 Cork Senior A Football Championship =

Annual Gaelic football competition season

- Dates: 26 July - 27 October 2024
- Teams: 12
- Sponsor: McCarthy Insurance Group
- Champions: Carrigaline (1st title); Jack McCarthy (captain); Michael Meaney (manager)
- Runners-up: Knocknagree; Daniel O'Mahony (captain); John Fintan Daly (manager)
- Relegated: Kiskeam

Tournament statistics
- Matches played: 24
- Goals scored: 42 (1.75 per match)
- Points scored: 586 (24.42 per match)
- Top scorer(s): Anthony O'Connor (4-20)

The 2024 Cork Senior A Football Championship was the fifth staging of the Cork Senior A Football Championship since its establishment by the Cork County Board in 2020. The draw for the group stage placings took place on 14 December 2023. The championship ran from 26 July to 27 October 2024.

The final was played on 27 October 2024 at SuperValu Páirc Uí Chaoimh in Cork, between Carrigaline and Knocknagree, in what was their first ever meeting in the final. Carrigaline won the match by 0-16 to 1-11 to claim their first ever championship title.

Knocknagree's Anthony O'Connor was the championship's top scorer with 4-20.

== Team changes ==
=== To Championship ===
Relegated from the Cork Premier Senior Football Championship

- Carrigaline

Promoted from the Cork Premier Intermediate Football Championship

- Cill na Martra

=== From Championship ===
Promoted to the Cork Premier Senior Football Championship

- Newcestown

Relegated to the Cork Premier Intermediate Football Championship

- Ilen Rovers

== Group A ==
=== Group A table ===
Quarter-finalists Relegation playoff

Team	Matches				Score			Pts
Team	Pld	W	D	L	For	Against	Diff	Pts
Carrigaline	3	3	0	0	49	35	14	6
Cill na Martra	3	2	0	1	58	47	11	4
Béal Átha'n Ghaorthaidh	3	1	0	2	48	49	-1	2
Kiskeam	3	0	0	3	22	46	-24	0

=== Group A results ===
27 July 2024 Round 1	Carrigaline	1-18 - 1-10	Béal Átha'n Ghaorthaidh	Kilmurry
	N Coakley 0-6 (0-2 f), B Coakley 1-3, K O’Reilly 0-5, B O’Driscoll 0-3 (0-1 f), D Griffin 0-1.	Report	B Seartan 0-5 (0-3 f), D Seartan 1-1, C Ó Loingsigh 0-2, S Ó Lúasa, S Ó Tuama 0-1 each.

27 July 2024 Round 1	Cill na Martra	1-18 - 0-09	Kiskeam	Clondrohid Grounds
	M Ó Duinnín 1-3; S Ó Duinnín 0-5; S Ó Fóirréidh 0-4; J Mac Cárthaigh 0-3 (0-2f); D Ó Duinnín (mark), T Ó Corcora 0-1 each.	Report	A Dennehy 0-3; S Sullivan 0-2 (0-1f); E Daly, M Casey, M Herlihy, T Dennehy 0-1 each.

18 August 2024 Round 2	Béal Átha'n Ghaorthaidh	2-14 - 2-15	Cill na Martra	Páirc Abán
	B Seartan 0-8 (0-2 f), S Ó Tuama, S Ó Luasa 1-0 each, D Mac Tomáis 0-2 (0-1 m), M Ó Riordáin, N Ó Laoire, D Seartan, S Ó Muineacháin 0-1 each.	Report	S Ó Duinnín 2-2 (0-1 m), D Ó Duinnín 0-4, D Ó HUrdaill (0-1 f), J Mac Cárthaigh (0-1 f) 0-2 each, M Ó Deasúna (f), A Ó hUídhir, D Ó Conaill, S Ó Fóirréidh, M Ó Duinnín 0-1 each.

18 August 2024 Round 2	Kiskeam	0-06 - 0-10	Carrigaline	Mallow GAA Complex
	S O’Sullivan (0-5, 2 frees); T Casey (0-1).	Report	B Coakley (0-3); J McCarthy (0-2); B O’Driscoll, D Griffin, D Greene, E Landers, N Coakley (mark) (0-1 each).

15 September 2024 Round 3	Carrigaline	1-15 - 0-16	Cill na Martra	Ballymaw Grounds
	B O’Driscoll 0-6 (0-3 f), N Coakley 0-4 (0-2 f), E Desmond 0-3 (0-1 f), C Barry 1-0, D Greene 0-2.	Report	D Ó Duinnín 0-5, S Ó Duinnín 0-4 (0-1 f), D Ó hUrdail 0-3 (0-2 f), J MacCárthaigh 0-2 (0-1 f), M Ó Duinnín, C Ó Duinnín 0-1 each.

22 September 2024 Round 3	Béal Átha'n Ghaorthaidh	1-12 - 0-07	Kiskeam	Carrigadrohid Grounds
	D Mac Thomáis 0-5 (0-2 f), M Ó Riordáin 1-0, D Seartan, C Ó Loinsigh, S Ó Tuama (f) 0-2 each, S Ó Múineacháin 0-1.	Report	T Casey (0-1 f), S O'Sullivan 0-2 each, S Meehan, M Casey, C Murphy 0-1 each.

== Group B ==
=== Group B table ===
Semi-finalists Quarter-finalists

Team	Matches				Score			Pts
Team	Pld	W	D	L	For	Against	Diff	Pts
Kanturk	3	3	0	0	56	33	23	6
Dohenys	3	2	0	1	53	41	12	4
O'Donovan Rossa	3	1	0	2	38	63	-25	2
Fermoy	3	0	0	3	37	47	-10	0

=== Group B results ===
26 July 2024 Round 1	Dohenys	0-15 - 0-17	Kanturk	Castle Grounds
	R Coakley 0-6 (0-2 f, 0-1 45), K White 0-5 (0-2 f), G Farr 0-3 (0-2 f), F Herlihy 0-1.	Report	G Bucinskas 0-8 (0-5 f), I Walsh 0-4, P Walsh 0-3, D O’Connell, C Clernon 0-1 each.

27 July 2024 Round 1	O'Donovan Rossa	1-14 - 0-16	Fermoy	Charlie Hurley Park
	K Davis 1-6 (3f); D Shannon 0-4 (2f), N Daly 0-2, T Hegarty 0-1, D Hourihane Senior 0-1.	Report	B Twomey 0-11 (7f); P De Roiste 0-3, T Clancy 0-1, A Aherne 0-1.

17 August 2024 Round 2	Fermoy	1-08 - 1-13	Dohenys	Páirc Liam Mhic Cárthaigh
	B Twomey 1-4 (0-2 f, 0-1 45), D Lardner 0-2 (0-1 f, 0-1 m), G O’Callaghan, P de Róiste 0-1 each.	Report	K White 0-5 (0-1 f), F Herlihy 1-1, G Farr (0-3 f), C Barry (0-2 f), 0-3 each, P Crowley 0-1.

18 August 2024 Round 2	Kanturk	3-16 - 0-08	O'Donovan Rossa	Kilmichael Grounds
	P Walsh 1-2, I Walsh 0-4 (0-1 f), D O’Connell, G Bucinskas 0-3 (0-1 f) each, L McLoughlin, Alan Walsh 1-0 each, C Clernon 0-2, Aidan Walsh, T Walsh 0-1 each.	Report	K Davis 0-6 f, D Shannon (f), S Fitzgerald 0-1 each.

15 September 2024 Round 3	Kanturk	2-08 - 0-10	Fermoy	O'Connell Park
	G Bucinskas (1-2), P Walsh (1-0), Alan Walsh (0-2), L O’Neill, I Walsh (f), Aidan Walsh, L McLoughlin 0-1 each.	Report	D Lardner (0-2, 0-1 mark, 0-1f), G O’ Callaghan (0-2), P de Roiste (0-2), T Clancy, D Daly, B Twomey, A Aherne 0-1 each.

15 September 2024 Round 3	Dohenys	2-16 - 1-10	O'Donovan Rossa	Rossmore Grounds
	G Farr 0-6 (0-5 f), F Herlihy 1-2, M Buckley 0-4, A Mannix 1-0, K White, S Barry 0-2 each.	Report	K Davis 1-4 (0-3 f), B Crowley 0-3, D Shannon 0-2, E Connolly 0-1.

== Group C ==
=== Group C table ===
Semi-finalists Quarter-finalists Relegation playoff

Team	Matches				Score			Pts
Team	Pld	W	D	L	For	Against	Diff	Pts
Knocknagree	3	3	0	0	64	34	30	6
Bishopstown	3	2	0	1	37	40	-3	4
Newmarket	3	1	0	2	38	38	0	2
Clyda Rovers	3	0	0	3	34	61	-27	0

=== Group C results ===
27 July 2024 Round 1	Clyda Rovers	0-11 - 2-08	Bishopstown	Blarney Grounds
	D Cooney (0-5, 3fs), C O’Sullivan (0-2), N Hanley, C O’Reilly, K Graham, C Flanagan (0-1 each).	Report	C Dunne (1-5, 5fs), M Nunan (1-0), B Clifford (0-2), P Casey (0-1).

27 July 2024 Round 1	Newmarket	0-11 - 0-15	Knocknagree	Nora Herlihy Park
	H O’Connor 0-3 (0-2f), B O’Connor (0-3), D O’Keeffe (0-2), P Allen, C Browne, R O’Keeffe 0-1 each.	Report	D R O’Connor 0-5 (0-2f), E McSweeney (0-3), M McSweeney, D O’Connor, P Doyle (f), T O’Connor, G Looney, T O’Mahony, A O’Connor 0-1 each.

17 August 2024 Round 2	Bishopstown	2-08 - 0-12	Newmarket	Mourneabbey Grounds
	C Dunne 0-5 (0-3 f, 0-1 m), L Hogan, K Murphy 1-0 each, M Nunan, S Collins, K McFadden 0-1 each.	Report	H O’Connor 0-6 (0-4 f, 0-1 45), R O’Keeffe 0-2 (0-1 f), B O’Connor, D Cottrell, P Allen, A Browne 0-1 each.

18 August 2024 Round 2	Knocknagree	5-17 - 0-14	Clyda Rovers	Dr Croke Park
	A O’Connor 2-5 (0-3 f), D O’Connor 1-4, D O’Mahony, M O’Mahony 1-0 each, E McSweeney, N O’Connor 0-2 each, G Looney, Tadgh O’Mahony, P Doyle (45), Timmy O’Connor 0-1 each.	Report	E Walsh 0-6 (0-3 f, 0-1 m), K Graham 0-3, C Flanagan 0-2, C O’Sullivan, D Cooney, C Walsh 0-1 each.

15 September 2024 Round 3	Newmarket	3-06 - 1-06	Clyda Rovers	Dr Croke Park
	B O’Connor 1-1, H O’Connor, C Browne 1-0 each, R O’Keeffe (1f), D Cottrell 0-2 each, D O’Keeffe 0-1.	Report	C Kelly 1-0 pen, C O’Sullivan 0-3 (0-1 f), D Cooney 0-2 f, E Walsh 0-1 f.

15 September 2024 Round 3	Knocknagree	2-11 - 0-09	Bishopstown	Clondrohid Grounds
	A O’Connor (0-6, 4f, 2m), E McSweeney (1-0), M Mahoney, (1-0), DR O’Connor (0-2), P Doyle (0-2, 1f, 1’45), N O’Connor (0-1).	Report	C Dunne (0-3, 2f), M Power, L Hogan, B Clifford, D O’Connor, M Nunan, P Honohan (all 0-1).

== Knockout stage ==
=== Bracket ===
Quarter-Finals
Carrigaline (Carrigdhoun)	1-13
Bishopstown (Seandun)	1-11
Dohenys (Carbery)	2-14
Cill na Martra (Muskerry)	0-14

Semi-Finals
Kanturk (Duhallow)
Carrigaline (Carrigdhoun)
Knocknagree (Duhallow)
Dohenys (Carbery)

Final

=== Relegation playoff ===
28 September 2024 Playoff	Clyda Rovers	1-09 - 0-07	Kiskeam	Kanturk Grounds
	C O’Sullivan (1-2, 0-1 free), D Cooney (0-2 frees), D Walsh, C Flanagan, K Graham, E Walsh and P Kissane (0-1 each).	Report	S O’Sullivan (0-4, 0-2 frees, 0-1 mark), D Scannell (0-2), A Carroll (0-1).

=== Quarter-finals ===
27 September 2024 Quarter-final	Dohenys	2-14 - 0-14	Cill na Martra	Castle Grounds
	K White 0-5, R Coakley (0-2 f), F Herlihy 0-3 each, A O’Donovan 1-0, OG 1-0, B Murphy, S Barry, C O’Shea, C Daly 0-1 each.	Report	J Mac Cárthaigh (0-3 f), S Ó Fóirréidh 0-4 each, S Ó Duinnín 0-2, C Ó Duinnín, G Ó Goillidhe, D Ó Connaill, D Ó Duinnín 0-1 each.

28 September 2024 Quarter-final	Carrigaline	1-13 - 1-11	Bishopstown	Páirc Uí Rinn
	N Coakley (1-2, 0-2 frees); É Desmond (0-4, 3 frees); B Coakley (0-2); I Sheerin, Kevin Kavanagh, J McCarthy, K McCarthy, E Landers (0-1 each).	Report	C Dunne (0-5, 3 frees, 1 mark); M Power (1-1); K McFadden (0-2); N Gough, D O’Connor, B Clifford (mark) (0-1 each).

=== Semi-finals ===
12 October 2024 Semi-final	Kanturk	0-17 - 0-17; Penalties: 1-2	Carrigaline	SuperValu Páirc Uí Chaoimh
	G Bucinskas (0-8, 0-5 frees, 0-1 ’45), Aidan Walsh, T Walsh and I Walsh (0-1 free) (0-2 each), P Walsh, R Walsh and J Fitzpatrick (0-1 each)	Report	E Desmond (0-5, 0-4 frees), K O’Reilly (0-4, 0-1 mark), N Coakley (0-3, 0-2 frees), B Coakley (0-2 ’45), K McCarthy, B O’Driscoll and I Sheerin (0-1 each).

12 October 2024 Semi-final	Knocknagree	1-18 - 0-10	Dohenys	SuperValu Páirc Uí Chaoimh
	A O’Connor (1-5, 1-0 penalty); Denis R O’Connor (0-5, 1 mark, 1 free); E McSweeney, M McSweeney, N O’Connor (1 mark) (0-2 each); M Mahoney, M Dilworth (0-1 each).	Report	K White (0-4, 3 frees); M Buckley (0-2); C Barry (mark), C Daly, R Coakley, S Barry (0-1 each).

=== Final ===
27 October 2024 Final	Carrigaline	0-16 - 1-11	Knocknagree	SuperValu Páirc Uí Chaoimh
	E Desmond (0-5, 0-2 frees), B Coakley (0-4, 0-2 ‘45s), N Coakley (0-3, 0-2 frees), B O’Driscoll (0-2), E Landers and D Griffin (0-1 each).	Report	A O’Connor (1-3, 0-1 free), N O’Connor (0-1 Mark), DR O’Connor (0-1 Mark, 0-2 frees) (0-3 each), E McSweeney (0-2).	Referee: J Bermingham (Bride Rovers)

== Championship statistics ==
=== Top scorers ===
Overall

Rank	Player	Club	Tally	Total	Matches	Average
1	Anthony O'Connor	Knocknagree	4-20	32	5	6.40
2	Grantas Bucinskas	Kanturk	1-21	24	4	6.00
3	Kevin Davis	O'Donovan Rossa	2-16	22	3	7.33
3	Denis O'Connor	Knocknagree	1-19	22	5	4.40
3	Niall Coakley	Carrigaline	1-19	22	6	3.66
6	Conor Dunne	Bishopstown	1-18	21	4	5.25
6	Keith White	Dohenys	0-21	21	5	4.20
8	Brian Coakley	Carrigaline	1-17	20	6	3.33
9	Shane Ó Duinnín	Cill na Martra	2-13	19	4	4.75
9	Ben Twomey	Fermoy	1-16	19	3	6.33

In a single game

Rank	Player	Club	Tally	Total	Opposition
1	Anthony O'Connor	Knocknagree	2-05	11	Clyda Rovers
1	Ben Twomey	Fermoy	0-11	11	O'Donovan Rossa
3	Kevin Davis	O'Donovan Rossa	1-06	9	Fermoy
4	Shane Ó Duinnín	Cill na Martra	2-02	8	Béal Átha'n Ghaorthaidh
4	Anthony O'Connor	Knocknagree	1-05	8	Dohenys
4	Conor Dunne	Bishopstown	1-05	8	Clyda Rovers
4	Ben Seartan	Béal Átha'n Ghaorthaidh	0-08	8	Cill na Martra
4	Grantas Bucinskas	Kanturk	0-08	8	Dohenys
4	Grantas Bucinskas	Kanturk	0-08	8	Carrigaline
10	Denis O'Connor	Knocknagree	1-04	7	Clyda Rovers
10	Kevin Davis	O'Donovan Rossa	1-04	7	Dohenys
10	Ben Twomey	Fermoy	1-04	7	Dohenys
