= 2021 Cork Senior A Football Championship =

- Dates: 3 September 2021 - 28 November 2021
- Teams: 12
- Sponsor: Bon Secours Hospital
- Champions: Mallow (1st title); Eoin Stanton (captain); Keith Moynihan (manager)
- Runners-up: St. Michael's; Owen O'Sullivan (captain); Dave Egan (manager)
- Relegated: Bantry Blues

Tournament statistics
- Matches played: 21
- Goals scored: 31 (1.48 per match)
- Points scored: 453 (21.57 per match)
- Top scorer(s): Mark Buckley (1-24)

The 2021 Cork Senior A Football Championship was the second staging of the Cork Senior A Football Championship since its establishment by the Cork County Board. The draw for the group stage placings took place on 29 April 2021. The championship began on 3 September 2021 and ended on 28 November 2021.

The final was played on 28 November 2021 at Páirc Uí Chaoimh in Cork, between Mallow and St. Michael's, in what was their first meeting in a final in this grade. Mallow won the match by 2-12 to 0-15 to claim their first championship title.

Mark Buckley was the championship's top scorer with 1-24.

== Team changes ==
=== To Championship ===
Promoted from the Cork Premier Intermediate Football Championship

- Knocknagree

Relegated from the Cork Premier Senior Football Championship

- Bishopstown

=== From Championship ===
Promoted to the Cork Premier Senior Football Championship

- Éire Óg

Relegated to the Cork Premier Intermediate Football Championship

- St. Nicholas'

== Group A ==
=== Table ===
Advance to play-offs

Team	Matches				Score			Pts
Team	Pld	W	D	L	For	Against	Diff	Pts
Béal Átha'n Ghaorthaidh	3	2	0	1	4-34	2-31	9	4
Dohenys	3	2	0	1	1-39	2-33	3	4
Bandon	3	1	1	1	3-28	2-36	-5	3
O'Donovan Rossa	3	0	1	2	1-37	3-38	-7	1

=== Results ===
4 September 2021 Round 1	O'Donovan Rossa	1-13 - 2-10	Bandon	Henry Ford Park
	K Davis (0-8, 5 frees), E Connolly (1-1), D Hazel, D Óg Hodnett, S Fitzgerald, D Shannon (0-1 each).	Report	B Collins (0-6, 3 frees, 1 mark), M Cahalane (1-3), M McNamara (1-1).	Referee: A O'Connor (Ballygarvan)

5 September 2021 Round 1	Béal Átha'n Ghaorthaidh	2-14 - 1-08	Dohenys	Páirc Cill Mhichíl
	B Seartan 0-6 (0-1 f), S Ó Luasa 1-1, C Ó Loinsigh 1-0, L Ó Conchúir, A Ó Coinceannain, D Mac Tomáis 0-2 each, D Seartan 0-1.	Report	K White 1-4 (0-3 f), F Herlihy 0-2, C Barry (f), M Buckley 0-1 each.

25 September 2021 Round 2	Bandon	1-10 - 1-09	Béal Átha'n Ghaorthaidh	Jack Fitzgerald Memorial Park
	B Collins 0-6 (0-1 f), C O’Mahony 1-0, M Cahalane (f), P Murphy, A Murphy, M McNamara 0-1 each.	Report	B Seartan 1-5 (0-2 f), L Seartan, A Ó Coinceannain, C Ó Duinnín, C Ó Loingsigh 0-1 each.

26 September 2021 Round 2	Dohenys	0-17 - 0-11	O'Donovan Rossa	Páirc Tadhg na Samhna
	M Buckley 0-6 (0-2 f), K White 0-3 (0-1 f), F Herlihy 0-3, B Murphy 0-2, J Kelly, J Farrell, C O’Shea 0-1 each.	Report	D Óg Hodnett 0-4 (0-1 f), D Shannon 0-4 (0-3 f), K Davis 0-2 (0-1 f), T Hegarty 0-1.	Referee: J Regan (Lough Rovers)

17 October 2021 Round 3	O'Donovan Rossa	0-13 - 1-11	Béal Átha'n Ghaorthaidh	Tadhg Mac Carthaigh's GAA Grounds
	D Shannon 5 frees, 1 mark (0-7); M Collins (0-2); S Fitzgerald, D Daly, T Hegarty, D Og Hodnett (0-1 each).	Report	L Seartan (1-2); L Ó Conchuir, B Seartan 1 free (0-3 each); D Seartan, S O Tuama, A O Coinceannain 1 free (0-1 each).

17 October 2021 Round 3	Bandon	0-08 - 0-14	Dohenys	St. Mary's Park
	B Collins (0-4, 0-2 frees), M Cahalane (free), P Murphy, C O’Mahony and M Sugrue (0-1 each).	Report	K White (0-7, 0-4 frees), F Herlihy (0-3), M Buckley (0-1 free) and C Barry (frees) (0-2 each).

== Group B ==
=== Table ===
Advance to play-offs Advance to relegation play-offs

Team	Matches				Score			Pts
Team	Pld	W	D	L	For	Against	Diff	Pts
St. Michael's	3	3	0	0	2-33	1-21	15	6
Knocknagree	3	2	0	1	2-35	1-25	13	4
Kiskeam	3	1	0	2	2-28	2-34	-6	2
Bishopstown	3	0	0	3	1-23	3-39	-22	0

=== Results ===
3 September 2021 Round 1	Bishopstown	0-05 - 2-10	St. Michael's	Páirc Uí Rinn
	R Cahill 0-3 (0-1 f), S Collins 0-2.	Report	E Buckley 1-3, D Lenihan1-0, K Hegarty 0-2, D Meaney 0-2, M Drummond, T Deasy, E Sheehan 0-1 each.

5 September 2021 Round 1	Kiskeam	1-05 - 1-13	Knocknagree	Patsy O'Sullivan Memorial Park
	T Casey 1-3, G Casey 0-2.	Report	F O’Connor 1-3 (0-2 f), E McSweeney 0-5, M Mahoney 0-2, P Doyle (45), D O’Connor, J Dennehy 0-1 each.

25 September 2021 Round 2	Kiskeam	1-08 - 0-13	St. Michael's	Coachford Sportsfield
	D Scannell 1-0, T Casey 0-3 (0-2 f) S O’Sullivan 0-2, G Casey, M Herlihy, AJ O’Connor 0-1 each.	Report	E Hegarty 0-4 (0-2 f), E Buckley 0-3 f, B Hegarty 0-2, K Hegarty, E Sheehan, A Hennessy, L O’Sullivan 0-1 each.	Referee: B Sweeney (Erin's Own)

26 September 2021 Round 2	Knocknagree	1-14 - 0-10	Bishopstown	Canovee GAA Grounds
	F O’Connor 1-6 (0-3 f, 0-1 mark), G Looney 0-3, D Twomey 0-2, M Mahoney, E McSweeney, JF Daly 0-1 each.	Report	S Collins 0-5 (0-3 f), L O’Driscoll 0-2, D Costello, C O’Driscoll, M Nunan 0-1 each.	Referee: P O'Leary (Kilmurry)

17 October 2021 Round 3	St. Michael's	0-10 - 0-08	Knocknagree	O'Connell Park
	A Hennessey (0-4), E Buckley 0-2 (0-1f), L Grainger (0-2), K Hegarty, E Hegarty 0-1 each.	Report	P Doyle 0-2 (0-1f, 0-1’45), J F Daly (0-2), E McSweeney (0-2), F O’Connor, D O’Connor 0-1 each.

17 October 2021 Round 3	Bishopstown	1-08 - 0-15	Kiskeam	Canovee GAA Grounds
	S Collins (1-2, 1-0 pen, 0-2 frees), M Power, J Murphy, D Costello, D Lester, D O’Connor and P Honohan (0-1 each).	[irishexaminer.com/sport/gaa/arid-40723365.html Report]	S O’Sullivan (0-5, 2 frees), D Scannell (0-4, 1 mark), T Casey (0-3, 1 free), G Casey, A Carroll and D Fitzgerald (0-1 each).

== Group C ==
=== Table ===
Advance to play-offs Advance to relegation play-offs

Team	Matches				Score			Pts
Team	Pld	W	D	L	For	Against	Diff	Pts
Mallow	3	3	0	0	4-30	2-24	12	6
Clyda Rovers	3	2	0	1	2-31	4-28	-3	4
Fermoy	3	1	0	2	3-31	2-33	1	2
Bantry Blues	3	0	0	3	2-25	3-32	-10	0

=== Results ===
4 September 2021 Round 1	Fermoy	1-09 - 0-14	Mallow	Castletownroche Sportsfield
	P de Roiste 0-4; K Morrison 1-0; R O’Hagan (0-2 f) 0-3; B Twomey (f), A O’Connor 0-1 each.	Report	K Sheehan 0-7 (0-6 f); M O’Rourke (f); S McDonnell 0-2 each; J Dillon, M Taylor, S O’Callaghan 0-1 each.	Referee: M Collins (Clonakilty)

5 September 2021 Round 1	Clyda Rovers	0-15 - 1-07	Bantry Blues	Jack Fitzgerald Memorial Park
	E Walsh 0-7 (0-5 f), C Flanagan (0-1 f), C O'Sullivan 0-2 each, S Ronayne, P Kissane, P Cronin, C Buckley 0-1 each.	Report	S O'Leary 1-0, A Coakley 0-5 (0-2 f), T Downey, T Foley 0-1 each.

26 September 2021 Round 2	Bantry Blues	0-07 - 0-11	Fermoy	Éire Óg GAA Grounds
	A Coakley 0-5 (0-2 f), D Murray, S Coughlan (45) 0-1 each.	Report	R O’Hagan 0-4 (0-2 f), B Twomey 0-3 (0-1 f), L Coleman (45), G Lardner, B O’Sullivan, A O’Connor 0-1 each.	Referee: R Whelan (Aghada)

26 September 2021 Round 2	Mallow	1-10 - 0-04	Clyda Rovers	O'Connell Park
	K O’Sullivan 1-0; S McDonnell, R Harkin, S Hayes 0-2 each; M Taylor, D Moynihan, K Sheehan (f), P Attridge 0-1 each.	Report	E Walsh 0-2 f; C Flanagan (f), F O’Shea 0-1 each.	Referee: C Lane (Banteer)

17 October 2021 Round 3	Mallow	3-06 - 1-11	Bantry Blues	Cill na Martra GAA Grounds
	K Sheehan 0-4 (2f), R Harkin 1-1 (1f), E Barry, S McDonnell 1-0 each, J Dillon 0-1.	Report	R Deane 0- 5 (2f), A Coakley 0-4 (1f), S Murray 1-0, S Coughlan, K Coakley 0-1 each.	Referee: P O'Leary (Cloughduv)

17 October 2021 Round 3	Fermoy	2-11 - 2-12	Clyda Rovers	Dr. Croke Park
	P de Róiste 1-2; B Twomey 0-4 (0-3 f); A O’Connor 1-0; R O’Hagan 0-2f; B O’Sullivan, T Clancy, K Morrison 0-1 each.	Report	E Walsh 1-2 (0-1 f); C Kelly 1-1 (1-0 pen); D O’Callaghan 0-3; P Cronin, C O’Sullivan 0-2 each; C Flanagan (f), N Hanley 0-1 each.

== Knockout stage ==
=== Relegation playoff ===
30 October 2021 Playoff	Bishopstown	1-16 - 1-09	Bantry Blues	Páirc Naomh Eoin
	S Collins 0-6 (0-4 f), P Honohan 1-1, P O’Flynn 0-3, D Crowley 0-3 (0-1 f), L O’Driscoll, D O’Connor and M Nunan 0-1 each.	Report	A Coakley 1-5 (0-5 f), R Deane 0-3 f, T Downey 0-1.

=== Quarter-finals ===
30 October 2021 Quarter-final	Béal Átha'n Ghaorthaidh	0-15 - 0-11	Clyda Rovers	Éire Óg GAA Grounds
	D Seartan 0-4 (0-1 f), C Ó Loinsaigh 0-3, A Ó Coinceannáin (f), L Seartan, L Ó Conchúir 0-2 each, B Seartan (f), D MacTomáis 0-1.	Report	C Flanagan 0-5 (0-1 f), E Walsh 0-3 (0-2 f), D O’Callaghan, M Forde, D Buckley 0-1 each.

30 October 2021 Quarter-final	Knocknagree	0-07 - 1-12	Dohenys	Castle Grounds
	F O’Connor 0-5 (0-3 f), D O’Connor, D Twomey 0-1 each.	Report	M Buckley 1-5 (0-3 f), K White 0-3 (0-2 f), E Lavers, J Kelly, R Coakley, N Hurley 0-1 each.

=== Semi-finals ===
13 November 2021 Semi-final	St Michael's	1-14 - 0-15	Dohenys	Páirc Uí Chaoimh
	M Drummond 1-0, A Hennessy 0-3 (0-2 f), K Hegarty 0-3, E Hegarty 0-2 (0-1 f), D Meaney, B Cain, L O'Sullivan, T Lenihan, E O'Donovan 0-1 each, E Buckley 0-1 f.	Report	M Buckley 0-10 (0-3 f, 0-2 45), K White 0-3, J Kelly, N Hurley 0-1 each.

13 November 2021 Semi-final	Mallow	4-14 - 2-10	Béal Átha'n Ghaorthaidh	Páirc Uí Chaoimh
	K Sheehan 0-5 (0-3f, 0-1m), S Hayes 1-2, M O’Rourke 0-4, R Harkin (penalty), S O’Callaghan, S McDonnell, 1-0 each, J Dillon, E Stanton, S Merritt 0-1 each.	Report	B Seartan 1-3 (0-1f), A Ó Coinceannáin 0-4f, D Mac Tomáis 1-0, C Ó Loingsigh 0-2, S Ó Tuama 0-1.	Referee: A Long (Argideen Rangers)

=== Final ===
28 November 2021 Final	St Michael's	0-15 - 2-12	Mallow	Páirc Uí Chaoimh
	T Deasy 0-8 (0-5 f, 0-1 45), E Hegarty 0-2 (0-1 f), K Hegarty, L Grainger, L O’Sullivan, A Hennessy (f), S Keating 0-1 each.	Report	S Hayes 1-1 (0-1 mark), K O’Sullivan 0-3 (0-1 f), S McDonnell 1-0, S Merritt (0-1 45), K Sheehan 0-2 each, S O’Callaghan, M Taylor, M O’Rourke (f), J Dillon 0-1 each.	Referee: P O'Driscoll (Bride Rovers)

=== Top scorers ===
Overall

Rank	Player	Club	Tally	Total	Matches	Average
1	Mark Buckley	Dohenys	1-24	27	5	5.40
2	Ben Seartan	Béal Átha'n Ghaorthaidh	2-18	24	5	4.80
3	Keith White	Dohenys	1-20	23	5	4.60
4	Arthur Coakley	Bantry Blues	1-19	22	4	5.50
5	Fintan O'Connor	Knocknagree	2-15	21	4	5.25
7	Kevin Sheehan	Mallow	0-19	19	5	3.80
6	Simon Collins	Bishopstown	1-15	18	4	4.50
7	Eoin Walsh	Clyda Rovers	1-14	17	4	4.25
9	Barry Collins	Bandon	0-16	16	3	5.33
10	Seán McDonnell	Mallow	3-04	13	5	2.60

In a single game

Rank	Player	Club	Tally	Total	Opposition
1	Mark Buckley	Dohenys	0-10	10	St. Michael's
2	Fintan O'Connor	Knocknagree	1-06	9	Bishopstown
3	Arthur Coakley	Bantry Blues	1-05	8	Bishopstown
3	Mark Buckley	Dohenys	1-05	8	Knocknagree
3	Ben Seartan	Béal Átha'n Ghaorthaidh	1-05	8	Bandon
3	Kevin Davis	O'Donovan Rossa	0-08	8	Bandon
3	Tadhg Deasy	St. Michael's	0-08	8	Mallow
8	Keith White	Dohenys	1-04	7	Béal Átha'n Ghaorthaidh
8	Kevin Sheehan	Mallow	0-07	7	Fermoy
8	Keith White	Dohenys	0-07	7	Bandon
8	Eoin Walsh	Clyda Rovers	0-07	7	Bantry Blues
