= 2022 Cork Senior A Football Championship =

- Dates: 22 July - 30 October 2022
- Teams: 12
- Sponsor: Bon Secours Hospital
- Champions: St. Michael's (1st title); Seán Keating (captain); Tom Lenihan (captain); Dave Egan (manager)
- Runners-up: Knocknagree; Fintan O'Connor (captain); John Fintan Daly (manager)
- Relegated: Bandon

Tournament statistics
- Matches played: 24
- Goals scored: 56 (2.33 per match)
- Points scored: 577 (24.04 per match)
- Top scorer(s): Kevin Davis (0-31)

The 2022 Cork Senior A Football Championship was the third staging of the Cork Senior A Football Championship since its establishment by the Cork County Board in 2020. The championship ran from 22 July and 30 October 2022.

The final was played on 30 October 2022 at Páirc Uí Chaoimh in Cork, between St. Michael's and Knocknagree, in what was their first meeting in a final in this grade. St. Michael's won the match by 2-07 to 0-06 to claim their first ever championship title.

O'Donovan Rossa's Kevin Davis was the championship's top scorer with 0-31.

== Team changes ==
=== To Championship ===
Promoted from the Cork Premier Intermediate Football Championship

- Newmarket

Relegated from the Cork Premier Senior Football Championship

- Ilen Rovers

=== From Championship ===
Promoted to the Cork Premier Senior Football Championship

- Mallow

Relegated to the Cork Premier Intermediate Football Championship

- Bantry Blues

== Group A ==
=== Group A table ===
Advance to knockout stage Advance to relegation play-off

Team	Matches				Score			Pts
Team	Pld	W	D	L	For	Against	Diff	Pts
Clyda Rovers	3	2	1	0	49	45	4	5
O'Donovan Rossa	3	2	0	1	60	41	19	4
Ilen Rovers	3	1	0	2	41	51	-10	2
Newmarket	3	0	1	2	43	56	-13	1

=== Group A results ===
23 July 2022 Round 1	Newmarket	1-10 - 3-16	O'Donovan Rossa	Castle Grounds
	C O’Keeffe 0-7 (0-6 f), C Browne 1-0, D Culloty 0-2 (0-1 f), B O’Connor 0-1.	Report	K Davis 0-8 (0-4 f), D Shannon 1-2, D Óg Hodnett, E Connolly 1-1 each, D Hourihane 0-2, B Crowley, T Hegarty 0-1 each.	Referee: P O'Leary (Cloughduv)

23 July 2022 Round 1	Ilen Rovers	1-12 - 1-13	Clyda Rovers	Kilmurry GAA Grounds
	D MacEoin 1-6 (0-3 f), S O’Donovan 0-4 (0-1 f), C O’Driscoll, A O’Driscoll 0-1 each.	Report	C Corbett 1-1 (0-1 m), E Walsh 0-4 (0-1 f), D O’Callaghan 0-3 f, C Flanagan 0-2 f, K Graham, N Hanley, C O’Sullivan 0-1 each.	Referee: P O'Leary (Kilmurry)

12 August 2022 Round 2	Clyda Rovers	1-14 - 1-14	Newmarket	Kanturk Grounds
	E Walsh 0-5 (0-1 f), D O’Callaghan 1-1 (0-1 45), C Flanagan 0-4 (0-3 f), C Corbett 0-2, C O’Sullivan, D Cooney 0-1 each.	Report	C O’Keeffe 1-6 (0-2 f), D Culloty 0-5 (0-1 f), B O’Connor, P Allen, C Buttimer 0-1 each.	Referee: J McEvoy (Blarney)

14 August 2022 Round 2	Ilen Rovers	1-09 - 2-16	O'Donovan Rossa	Castlehaven Grounds
	D Mac Eoin (1-3, 1-0 pen, 0-1 free), A O’Driscoll and C O’Driscoll (0-2 each), D Hegarty and S O’Donovan (0-1 each).	Report	K Davis (0-6, 0-5 frees), T Hegarty (1-2), D Óg Hodnett (0-3), K Hurley (1-0), D Hourihane (0-2), M Collins, D Shannon and E Connolly (0-1 each).	Referee: A Long (Argideen Rangers)

3 September 2022 Round 3	Ilen Rovers	0-14 - 0-13	Newmarket	Cloughduv Grounds
	A Holland (2 frees) and D McEoin (frees) (0-4 each), S O’Donovan (0-3, 0-1 free), M Sheehy (0-2), D Hegarty (0-1).		C O’Keeffe (0-8, 0-7 frees), B O’Connor (0-2), A Browne, B Daly and R O’Keeffe (0-1 each).	Referee: P O'Leary (Cloughduv)

3 September 2022 Round 3	Clyda Rovers	3-07 - 1-10	O'Donovan Rossa	Coachford Sportsfield
	D O’Callaghan (2-3, 0-1 free), D Cooney (1-1), E Walsh (0-2, 0-1 free), C Corbett (0-1).	Report	K Davis (0-6, 0-5 frees), N Daly (1-1), D Óg Hodnett (0-2), E Connolly (0-1).	Referee: J Ryan (Macroom)

== Group B ==
=== Group B table ===
Advance to knockout stage Advance to relegation play-off

Team	Matches				Score			Pts
Team	Pld	W	D	L	For	Against	Diff	Pts
Béal Átha'n Ghaorthaidh	3	2	1	0	46	43	3	5
Dohenys	3	1	2	0	44	37	7	4
Kiskeam	3	1	1	1	39	38	1	3
Bandon	3	0	0	3	38	49	-11	0

=== Group B results ===
22 July 2022 Round 1	Béal Átha'n Ghaorthaidh	0-13 - 1-10	Dohenys	St. Mary's Grounds
	D Seartan 0-3, C Ó Loinsigh 0-3 (0-1 45), B Seartan 0-3 (2f), A Ó Coinceannáin 0-2 f, D Mac Tomáis 0-2.	Report	F Herlihy 0-3, G Farr 0-3 f, M Buckley 1-0, J Kelly, M Quinn 0-1, J Collins 0-1, K White 0-1f.	Referee: J McEvoy (Blarney)

22 July 2022 Round 1	Bandon	0-10 - 1-10	Kiskeam	Clondrohid GAA Grounds
	B Collins 0-5 (0-2 f, 0-1 45), M McNamara 0-2, M Cahalane, J Mulcahy, D Crowley 0-1 each.	Report	T Casey 0-4 (0-1 45), S O’Sullivan 0-3, T Dennehy 1-0, T O’Sullivan, D Fitzgerald, D Scannell 0-1 each.	Referee: R Whelan (Aghada)

12 August 2022 Round 2	Dohenys	0-20 - 1-10	Bandon	Ballinacarriga Grounds
	G Farr 0-5 (0-3 f), M Buckley 0-4 (0-1 f), F Herlihy, K White (0-1 f) 0-3 each, C O’Donovan, M Quinn, E Lavers, A O’Donovan and R Coakley 0-1 each.	Report	B Collins 1-2 (0-1 m), C Calnan, D Crowley, J Mulcahy 0-2, M Cahalane (f), C Long 0-1 each.	Referee: J Enright (Glengarriff)

13 August 2022 Round 2	Béal Átha'n Ghaorthaidh	1-14 - 1-12	Kiskeam	Castle Grounds
	D Seartan 1-1, B Seartan 0-4 (0-1 f), D MacTomáis 0-3, C Ó Loinsigh 0-2, N Ó Laoire, C Ó Duinín, A Coinceannáin, L Ó Concùir 0-1 each.	Report	S Sullivan 1-6 (0-2 f), T O’Sullivan 0-3, T Casey, D Fitzgerald, G Casey 0-1 each.	Referee: A Whelton (Clonakilty)

3 September 2022 Round 3	Béal Átha'n Ghaorthaidh	1-13 - 1-12	Bandon	Ballinacarriga Grounds
	B Seartan 0-5 (0-1 f), C Ó Loinsigh 0-3 (0-1 45), D Seartan 1-0, D MacTomáis 0-2, A Ó Coinceannáin (0-1 f), D Ó Ceallacháin, S Ó Tuama 0-1 each.	Report	M Sugrue 1-6 (0-4 f), J Mulcahy 0-2, D Crowley, J Walsh, M Cahalane, A O’Mahony 0-1 each.	Referee: J Enright (Glengarriff)

3 September 2022 Round 3	Dohenys	0-11 - 1-08	Kiskeam	Castle Grounds
	M Buckley 0-3, F Herlihy (0-1 mark), B O’Donovan 0-2 each, Jerry Collins, C O’Donovan, G Farr, C O’Shea 0-1 each.	Report	T O’Sullivan 1-0, S O’Sullivan (0-2 f) 0-3, T Casey 0-2, M Casey, AJ O’Connor, G Casey 0-1 each.	Referee: C Dineen (Douglas)

== Group C ==
=== Group C table ===
Advance to knockout stage

Team	Matches				Score			Pts
Team	Pld	W	D	L	For	Against	Diff	Pts
St. Michael's	3	3	0	0	63	40	23	6
Knocknagree	3	1	0	2	49	46	3	2
Bishopstown	3	1	0	2	46	57	-11	2
Fermoy	3	1	0	2	35	50	-15	2

=== Group C results ===
22 July 2022 Round 1	Bishopstown	2-06 - 0-16	Fermoy	Bride Rovers Grounds
	C Dunne 1-1, D O’Sullivan 1-0, J O’Sullivan 0-3 (0-2 f), S Collins, P O’Flynn 0-1 each.	Report	S Aherne 0-4, L Coleman (f), B Twomey 0-3 each, P De Roiste 0-2, D Dawson, D O’Flynn, J Molloy, D Daly 0-1 ea	Referee: J Bermingham (Bride Rovers)

23 July 2022 Round 1	St Michael's	2-12 - 2-09	Knocknagree	Carrigadrohid Grounds
	A Hennessey 2-2, E Hegarty 0-5 (0-1 f), P Cunningham, T Lenihan, A Murphy, R O’Shaughnessy, D Lenihan 0-1 each.	Report	F O’Connor 1-6 (0-5 f), M McSweeney 1-0, G Looney, M Mahoney, D O’Connor 0-1 each.	Referee: A O'Connor (Ballygarvan)

13 August 2022 Round 2	St Michael's	1-17 - 0-11	Fermoy	Felix Sarsfield Memorial Park
	K Hegarty 1-3, R Cotter 0-6 (0-4 f), E Hegarty, A Hennessy, L O’Sullivan 0-2 each, P Cunningham, D Linehan 0-1 each.	Report	P de Roiste 0-5 (0-2 f), B Twomey 0-4 (0-2 f, 0-1 45), M Brennan, D O’Flynn 0-1 each.	Referee: B Coniry (Crosshaven)

14 August 2022 Round 2	Knocknagree	1-13 - 2-14	Bishopstown	Mallow GAA Complex
	JF Daly 1-1, G Looney, M McSweeney and D Moynihan 0-2 each, D Cooper, J Dennehy, M Dilworth, D O’Connor and N O’Connor 0-1 each, F O’Connor 0-1 (0-1 free).	Report	J O’Sullivan 0-6 (0-2 frees), C Dunne 1-1, O Devlin 1-0, S Collins, L Hogan and P Honohan 0-2 each, C Dorman 0-1.	Referee: A Hyland (Kilworth)

3 September 2022 Round 3	St Michael's	2-19 - 2-08	Bishopstown	Páirc Uí Rinn
	A Murphy 0-5, R Cotter 0-4 (0-2 f), A Hennessy 0-3, P Cunningham, M O’Keeffe 1-0 each, K Hegarty 0-2, A O’Callaghan, D Meaney, E Hegarty, E O’Donovan, L O’Herlihy 0-1 each.	Report	J O’Sullivan 0-8 (0-6 f), S Collins, C Dunne 1-0 each.	Referee: P O'Driscoll (Bride Rovers)

3 September 2022 Round 3	Knocknagree	3-09 - 1-05	Fermoy	O'Connell Park
	D O’Connor 2-1, F O’Connor 0-4 (0-2 f), M Doyle 1-0, M Dilworth 0-2, N O’Connor, M Mahoney 0-1 each.	Report	B Twomey 1-1, P de Róiste 0-2 (0-1 f), S Aherne, D O’Flynn 0-1 each.	Referee: C Walsh (Nemo Rangers)

== Knockout stage ==
=== Bracket ===
Quarter-Finals
Béal Átha'n Ghaorthaidh (Muskerry)	0-15
Knocknagree (Duhallow)	1-15
Dohenys (Carbery)	0-08
O'Donovan Rossa (Carbery)	0-13

Semi-Finals
Clyda Rovers (Avondhu)	1-15
Knocknagree (Duhallow)	1-17
St. Michael's (Seandun)	2-21
O'Donovan Rossa (Carbery)	2-11

Final
Knocknagree (Duhallow)	0-06
St. Michael's (Seandun)	2-07

=== Relegation playoff ===
17 September 2022 Playoff	Newmarket	5-11 - 1-08	Bandon	Coachford Sportsfield
	R O’Keeffe 4-3, D O’Keeffe 1-0, C O’Keeffe 0-3, B O’Connor, D Culloty (f) 0-2 each, M Cottrell 0-1.	Report	M McNamara 1-0 pen, M Sugrue 0-3 f, C Calnan 0-2, C O’Mahony, P Murphy, D Crowley 0-1 each.	Referee: P O'Leary (Cloughduv)

=== Quarter-finals ===
17 September 2022 Quarter-final	Béal Átha'n Ghaorthaidh	0-15 - 1-15	Knocknagree	Millstreet Grounds
	B Seartan 0-4 (0-2 f), A Ó Coinceannáin 0-4 f, C Ó Loingsigh, D Mac Tomáis 0-2 each, S Ó Tuama, L Ó Conchúir 0-1 each.	Report	M Doyle 1-1, F O'Connor 0-4 (0-3 f), Denis O’Connor 0-3, David O’Connor 0-2, G Looney, M Dilworth, M McSweeney, N O’Connor 0-1 each.	Referee: P O'Driscoll (Bride Rovers)

18 September 2022 Quarter-final	Dohenys	0-08 - 0-13	O'Donovan Rossa	Wolfe Tone Park
	M Buckley 0-3 (0-1f), G Farr 0-2 (0-1f), M Quinn, C O’Shea, K White 0-1 each.	Report	K Davis 0-6 (0-3f, 0-1m), D Hourihane 0-4, R Byrne 0-2, D Shannon 0-1m	Referee: D Murnane (Macroom)

==== Semi-finals ====
1 October 2022 Semi-final	St. Michael's	2-21 - 2-11	O'Donovan Rossa	Páirc Uí Chaoimh
	R Cotter 1-6 (0-2f), A Hennessy 0-4, E O'Donovan 1-1, E Hegarty, L O'Herlihy 0-3 each, T Lenihan, P Cunningham, D Meaney, A Murphy 0-1 each.	Report	K Davis 0-5 (0-4f), D Hourihane 1-2, D Shannon 1-1, D Óg Hodnett 0-2, T Hegarty 0-1.	Referee: J Ryan (Macroom)

1 October 2022 Semi-final	Clyda Rovers	1-15 - 1-17	Knocknagree	Páirc Uí Chaoimh
	K Graham (1-2), C Corbett and E Walsh (0-2 frees) (0-3 each), D O’Callaghan (0-2, 0-1 free, 0-1 ’45), C O’Sullivan, C Flanagan, K Coffey, C Buckley and J Buckley (0-1 each).	Report	F O’Connor (1-5, 0-3 frees, 0-1 mark), M Dilworth and N O’Connor (0-3 each), M McSweeney, DR O’Connor (0-1 mark) and E McSweeney (0-2 each).	Referee: P O'Driscoll (Bride Rovers)

==== Final ====
30 October 2022 Final	St. Michael's	2-07 - 0-06	Knocknagree	Páirc Uí Chaoimh
	A Hennessy 2-1, R Cotter 0-2 f, P Cunnigham, E Hegarty, K Hegarty, D Meaney 0-1 each.	Report	F O’Connor, E McSweeney (0-1 f) 0-2 each, M McSweeney, N O’Connor 0-1 each.	Referee: J Regan (Lough Rovers)

== Championship statistics ==
=== Top scorers ===
Top scorer overall

Rank	Player	Club	Tally	Total	Matches	Average
1	Kevin Davis	O'Donovan Rossa	0-31	31	5	6.20
2	Fintan O'Connor	Knocknagree	2-22	28	6	5.66
3	Conor O'Keeffe	Newmarket	1-24	27	4	6.75
4	Adam Hennessy	St. Michael's	4-12	24	5	4.80
5	Robbie Cotter	St. Michael's	1-18	21	4	5.25
6	Dan Mac Eoin	Ilen Rovers	2-13	19	3	6.33
7	Dan O'Callaghan	Clyda Rovers	3-09	18	4	4.50
8	Jamie O'Sullivan	Bishopstown	0-17	17	3	5.66
9	Ryan O'Keeffe	Newmarket	4-04	16	2	8.00
9	Ben Seartan	Béal Átha'n Ghaorthaidh	0-16	16	4	4.00

In a single game

Rank	Player	Club	Tally	Total	Opposition
1	Ryan O'Keeffe	Newmarket	4-03	15	Bandon
2	Dan O'Callaghan	Clyda Rovers	2-03	9	O'Donovan Rossa
2	Seán O'Sullivan	Kiskeam	1-06	9	Béal Átha'n Ghaorthaidh
2	Mark Sugrue	Bandon	1-06	9	Béal Átha'n Ghaorthaidh
2	Dan Mac Eoin	Ilen Rovers	1-06	9	Clyda Rovers
2	Conor O'Keeffe	Newmarket	1-06	9	Clyda Rovers
2	Fintan O'Connor	Knocknagree	1-06	9	St. Michael's
2	Robbie Cotter	St. Michael's	1-06	9	O'Donovan Rossa
9	Adam Hennessy	St. Michael's	2-02	8	Knocknagree
9	Kevin Davis	O'Donovan Rossa	0-08	8	Newmarket
9	Conor O'Keeffe	Newmarket	0-08	8	Ilen Rovers
9	Jamie O'Sullivan	Bishopstown	0-08	8	St. Michael's
