= 2021 All-Ireland Under-20 Football Championship =

Fourth staging of All-Ireland Under-20 Championship

Championship details
- Dates: 1 July – 15 August 2021
- Teams: 31

All-Ireland Champions
- Winning team: Offaly (2nd win)
- Captain: Kieran Dolan
- Manager: Declan Kelly

All-Ireland Finalists
- Losing team: Roscommon
- Captain: Colin Walsh
- Manager: Liam Tully

Provincial Champions
- Munster: Cork
- Leinster: Offaly
- Ulster: Down
- Connacht: Roscommon

Championship statistics
- No. matches played: 30
- Goals total: 91 (3.03 per game)
- Points total: 667 (22.23 per game)
- Top Scorer: Jack Bryant (4–22)
- Player of the Year: Jack Bryant

The 2021 All-Ireland Under-20 Football Championship was the fourth staging of the All-Ireland Under-20 Championship and the 58th staging overall of a Gaelic football championship for players between the minor and senior grades. The competition began on 1 July and ended on 15 August 2021.

The defending champion was Galway; however, the team was beaten by Mayo after a penalty shootout in the Connacht semi-final.

The final was played on 15 August 2021 at Croke Park in Dublin, between Offaly and Roscommon, in what was their first ever championship meeting. Offaly won the match by 1-14 to 1-11 to claim a second title and a first title since 1988.

== Results ==
=== Connacht Under-20 Football Championship ===
==== Quarter-final ====
6 July 2021 Quarter-final	Roscommon	4-16 (28) - (10) 0-10	Leitrim	Dr Hyde Park
	D Cregg 0-9 (5f); A McDermott 1-3; B O’Carroll 1-2 (1f); J Fitzpatrick 1-1; D Heneghan 1-0; K Doyle 0-1.	Report	T Prior, P Keaney (1f) 0-3 each; O Bohan 0-2f; P McKenna, B McWeeney 0-1 each.

==== Semi-finals ====
13 July 2021 Semi-final	Galway	1-08 (11) - (11) 0-11 (aet) (6-7 on penalties)	Mayo	Tuam Stadium
	Nathan Grainger 1-1 (1-0 pen), Tomo Culhane 0-3f, Tony Gill, Conall Gallagher, Ryan Monahan, Matthew Cooley 0-1 each	Report	Jack Mahon 0-4 (0-3f), Connell Dempsey 0-2f, Jack Carney, Ultan O'Reilly, Frank Irwin, Paddy Heneghan, Dylan Thornton 0-1 each	Referee: John Gilmartin (Sligo); Man of the Match: Ruairi Keane (Mayo Gaels)

14 July 2021 Semi-final	Roscommon	4-13 (25) - (18) 2-12	Sligo	Dr Hyde Park
	James Fitzpatrick 2-2, Daire Cregg 0-4 (0-3f), Ronan Garvin and Jason Doory 1-0 each, Adam McDermott and Ben O'Carroll (0-2f) 0-3 each, Colin Walsh 0-1	Report	Lee Deignan 0-5 (0-3f, 1 '45), Sean Carroll and Joseph Keaney 1-0 each, Oisin Flynn 0-3f, Ciaran O'Reilly, Gavin Duffy, Jack Davitt, Aaron Perry 0-1 each	Referee: James Molloy (Galway)

==== Final ====
21 July 2021 Final	Roscommon	2-11 (17) - (10) 1-07	Mayo	Elverys MacHale Park
	James Fitzpatrick 1-3, Daire Cregg 0-5 (0-3f), Adam McDermott 1-1, Ben O'Carroll and Darragh Heneghan 0-1 each	Report	Connell Demsey 1-2 (1-0 pen, 0-1f), Jack Carney 0-2, Sean Holmes, Jack Mahon (0-1f), Owen McHale 0-1 each	Referee: Thomas Murphy (Galway); Man of the Match: James Fitzpatrick (Oran)

=== Leinster Under-20 Football Championship ===
==== First round ====
1 July 2021 First round	Kildare	1-13 (16) - (18) 1-15	Westmeath	St Conleth's Park
	E Bagnall 0-5 (0-3fs), N Aherne 1-0, M Curtin 0-1f, T Martin 0-1, D O’Donoghue 0-1, N O’Regan 0-1, P McDermott 0-1, T Gill 0-1; S Farrell 0-1, M McGovern 0-1.	Report	B McGauren 1-10 (0-10fs), K O’Sullivan 0-2, B Kelly 0-1, S Flemming 0-1, S O’Connor 0-1m.

1 July 2021 First round	Louth	3-13 (22) - (23) 4-11	Longford	McGeough Park
	J Hughes 2-2, G Bell 1-2, C McCaul 0-3 (2f), C Gillespie 0-4 (2f), L Matthews (’45), G Stewart 0-1 each.	Report	K McGann 1-5, D Reynolds 1-3 (2f), E Finneran 1-0, J Duggan 1-0, E McCormack, T McNevin, F Hourican 0-1 each.

1 July 2021 First round	Wicklow	2-11 (17) - (14) 2-08	Laois	Aughrim County Ground
	E Darcy 2-1, M Ging 0-4 (0-3f), J Keogh 0-3f, K Quinn 0-2 (0-1m), E Byrne 0-1.	Report	R Murphy 1-2 (0-2f), C Dunne 0-4 (0-3f), A Dunne 1-1, K Swayne 0-1.

1 July 2021 First round	Carlow	0-08 (8) - (15) 2-09	Wexford	Netwatch Cullen Park
	A Keating 0-3f, L Connolly, N Hickey 0-2 each, B Byrne 0-1f.	Report	C Kehoe 1-3, J Higgins 1-1, C Regan 0-2, A Larkin (f), J O’Leary, R Fitzpatrick 0-1 each.

==== Quarter-finals ====
8 July 2021 Quarter-final	Wexford	1-09 (12) - (13) 1-10	Offaly	Chadwicks Wexford Park
	S Pettitt 1-5 (5f), A Larkin 0-2 (2f), J O'Leary (m) and J Curtis 0-1 each.	Report	J Bryant 1-3 (1-0 penalty), M Tynan (1f), C Delaney (2f) and A Kellaghan (1m) 0-2 each, C Flynn 0-1.

8 July 2021 Quarter-final	Dublin	1-12 (15) - (11) 1-08	Wicklow	Parnell Park
	F Murray 0-6 (0-1f, 0-1 '45'), L Swan 0-3, S Foran 1-0, M L’Estrange, M O’Leary, M Lavin 0-1 each.	Report	K Quinn 0-4, JP Nolan 1-1, C McDonald 0-2 (0-1pen), M Ging (0-1f) 0-1.

8 July 2021 Quarter-final	Longford	3-09 (18) - (18) 2-12 (aet) (4-5 on penalties)	Westmeath	Glennon Brothers Pearse Park
	J Duggan 1-6 3fs, 1m, J Moran, D Reynolds 1-0 each, J Donnelly, K McGann, E McCormack 0-1 each.	Report	B Kelly 1-4, S Baker 1-0, J McDonnell 0-3, B McGauran 0-2, 1f, E Gaffney, K O’Sullivan, L Moran 0-1 each

==== Semi-finals ====
15 July 2021 Semi-final	Offaly	1-11 (14) - (12) 1-09	Westmeath	TEG Cusack Park
	Jack Bryant 0-7 (0-4f), Cormac Egan 1-1, Aaron Kellaghan, Cormac Delaney (0-1f), Keith O'Neill 0-1 each	Report	Ben McGauran 0-5 (4f), Devin Hill 1-1, Shane Fleming (0-1m), Jack Torpey, Liam Moran 0-1 each	Referee: Seamus Mulhare

15 July 2021 Semi-final	Dublin	4-07 (19) - (13) 0-13	Meath	Páirc Tailteann
	Mark Lavin 1-3 (0-1f), Adam Fearon, Lorcan O’Dell, Luke Swan 1-0 each, Fionn Murray 0-3 (2 '45), Luke Murphy-Guinane 0-1	Report	Luke Mitchell 0-6 (0-5f), Diarmuid Moriarty 0-4, Jack Flynn (2 '45), Niall Finnerty 0-1	Referee: Fergal Smyth (Offaly)

==== Final ====
22 July 2021 Final	Offaly	0-15 (15) - (12) 3-03	Dublin	O'Moore Park
	Jack Bryant 0-6 (0-4f), Morgan Tynan 0-4 (0-2f, 1 '45), Cormac Egan 0-2, Cathal Flynn, Aaron Kelleghan, Keith O'Neill (0-1f) 0-1 each	Report	Lorcan O'Dell and Fionn Murray 1-1 each, Mark Lavin 1-0, Adam Fearon 0-1	Referee: Cormac Reilly (Meath); Man of the Match: Cormac Egan (Tullamore)

=== Munster Under-20 Football Championship ===
==== Quarter-finals ====
8 July 2021 Quarter-final	Waterford	4-05 (17) - (12) 1-09	Clare	Fraher Field
	T O’Connell 3-1, H Griffin 1-0, N McSweeney 0-2 (2fs), P Fitzgerald, C Foley 0-1 each.	Report	M McInerney 1-3 (1-0 pen), E McMahon 0-3 (2fs), C McGroary, R Barry, B McNamara 0-1 each.	Referee: B Griffin (Kerry)

8 July 2021 Quarter-final	Tipperary	0-16 (16) - (13) 1-10	Limerick	Semple Stadium
	S O Connor (0-7, 5f), B Kehoe (0-4), M O Connor (0-1), K Grogan (0-1); L Kennedy (0-1); B Comerford (0-1), T Condon (0-1).	Report	B Ahern (1-1), C Ryan (0-4, 4f), E Riordan (0-1), D O Keeffe (0-1); P Shanahan (0-1), B Foley (0-1), J Molyneux (0-1).	Referee: D Murnane (Cork)

==== Semi-finals ====
15 July 2021 Semi-final	Tipperary	0-11 (11) - (9) 0-09	Waterford	Semple Stadium
	S O Connor (0-6,3fs), K Grogan (0-2,2fs), C Deeley, C Cadell, R Walsh (0-1 each);	Report	P Fitzgerald (0-3), N McSweeney, T O Connell (1f) (0-2 each), S Fitzgerald, A Ryan (0-1 each).	Referee: N Ryan (Cork)

15 July 2021 Semi-final	Cork	3-12 (21) - (20) 3-11	Kerry	Semple Stadium
	C Corbett 2-4 (0-2f), D Buckley 0-3, J Cahalane 1-0, A Walsh-Murphy, D Dorgan (0-1f), C Walsh, C O’Sullivan, C O’Hanlon 0-1 each.	Report	D Geaney 1-4 (0-4f), P O’Shea 1-2 (1-0 pen), D Lyne 1-0, R Ó Beaglaoich, S Quilter (0-2f) 0-2 each, K Falvey 0-1.	Referee: J Hayes (Limerick)

==== Final ====
22 July 2021 Final	Cork	3-20 (29) - (19) 3-10	Tipperary	Semple Stadium
	David Buckley 0-10 (0-2f, 0-1m), Colin Walsh 1-3, Diarmuid Phelan and Sean McDonnell 1-0 each, Dara Dorgan 0-3 (0-2f), Conor Corbett 0-2, Jack Cahalane and Michael O'Neill (0-1f) 0-1 each	Report	Sean O'Connor 2-2 (0-1f), Kevin Grogan 0-3 (0-2f), Jamie Holloway 1-0, Cathal Deeley and Ryan Walsh 0-2 each, Emmett Butler 0-1	Referee: Brendan Griffin (Kerry); Man of the Match: David Buckley (Newcestown)

=== Ulster Under-20 Football Championship ===
==== Preliminary round ====
2 July 2021 Preliminary round	Donegal	1-17 (20) - (8) 0-08	Armagh	MacCumhaill Park
	E Dowling 1-2, P McGettigan 0-4, J McGroddy 0-3 (3f), S O’Donnell 0-3, R McFadden 0-2, R O’Rourke, R O’Donnell, C McColgan 0-1.	Report	M McKeever 0-3 (3f), J McCormac 0-2, E Woods, J Martin 0-1, L Camara 0-1 (1f), J Sheridan 0-1 (1M)

==== Quarter-finals ====
9 July 2021 Quarter-final	Tyrone	1-09 (12) - (15) 1-12	Donegal	Healy Park
	L Donnelly (0-5, 5f), R Donnelly (1-0), C Bogue (0-1), O Robinson (0-1), O McCann (0-1); D Fullerton (0-1).	Report	E Dowling (1-01), J McGroddy (0-04, 3f), R McFadden (0-02); P McGettigan (0-02, 1f), S O’Donnell (0-01), R O’Donnell (0-01), N Byrne (0-01).

9 July 2021 Quarter-final	Fermanagh	2-13 (19) - (10) 0-10	Antrim	Brewster Park
	C Love (0-7, 0-4fs), D McBrien (1-2, 0-1f), Josh Largo-Ellis (1-0), A McManus (0-2), Joe McDade (0-1), D King (0-1).	Report	F Henry (0-2), O Doherty (0-2), L Mulholland (0-1, 0-1f); P McLaughlin (0-1); N Burns (0-1), E Hynds (0-1. 0-1f), E Matasa (0-1), S Duffin (0-1).

9 July 2021 Quarter-final	Cavan	0-09 (9) - (23) 2-17	Down	Kingspan Breffni Park
	E Boylan (0-2, 1f), S McEvoy (0-2), E Clarke (0-1), E McCaffrey (0-1), E Maguire (0-1), P McPhilips (0-1).	Report	D Magill (1-2, 1f), A Gilmore (1-1), C Smyth (0-4, 2f, two 45s), T Close (0-2), S Johnston (0-2), T Smyth (0-2), E Brown (0-2), S Óg McCusker (0-1), R O’Hare (0-1f).

9 July 2021 Quarter-final	Derry	0-11 (11) - (15) 2-09	Monaghan	Owenbeg
	O McLarnon (0-1), E Downey (0-3, 2f), J Duggan (0-1), S Kearney (0-2), C McMonagle (0-1), D McGilligan (0-1), J McGurk (0-1), C McAteer (0-1).	Report	J Irwin (2-1), D Treanor (0-1), L McDonald (0-1), J Wilson (0-1), D Swinburne (0-1), D McElearney (0-1), D Dempsey (0-2), J McGeown (0-1).

==== Semi-finals ====
16 July 2021 Semi-final	Down	1-13 (16) - (10) 0-10	Fermanagh	Athletic Grounds
	R O’Hare (1-0), J McGovern (0-3); T Close (0-2, 1mark); S Johnston (0-2, 1f), A Gilmore (0-2), E Brown (0-1), C Smyth (0-1, f); A Morgan (0-1), D Magill (0-1).	Report	D McBrien (0-5, 2f, 1mark), C Love (0-2, 1f), R McCaffrey (0-2), Joe McDade (0-1).

16 July 2021 Semi-final	Donegal	1-11 (14) - (19) 3-10	Monaghan	Brewster Park
	R McFadden 1-0, J McGroddy 0-3, R O'Donnell 0-3, P McGettigan 0-2, J Gallagher 0-1, K Dunleavy 0-1, S O'Donnell 0-1.	Report	D Swinburne 3-0, S Jones 0-3, D Dempsey 0-2, R Grimes 0-1, R Boyle 0-1, D McElearney 0-1, S Slevin 0-1, M Hamill 0-1.

==== Final ====
30 July 2021 Final	Down	3-15 (24) - (17) 1-14 (aet)	Monaghan	Athletic Grounds
	A Gilmore 1-3 (2f); R O’Hare 1-2; J Clarke 1-0; S Johnston (f), T Smyth, C Smyth (2f) 0-2 each; A Morgan, P McMullan, D Magill, S Croskey 0-1 each.	Report	S Jones 0-8 (3f); D McElearney 1-1; J Irwin 0-2; R Boyle, D Swinburne, K Connolly 0-1 each.	Referee: K Eanetta (Tyrone)

=== All-Ireland Under-20 Football Championship ===
==== Semi-finals ====
31 July 2021 Semi-final	Cork	0-14 (14) - (19) 3-10	Offaly	MW Hire O'Moore Park
	D Buckley 0-5 (0-4 f, 0-1 mark), C O’Sullivan 0-3, C Walsh 0-2, B Hayes 0-2 (45), D Dorgan, M O’Neill 0-1 f each.	Report	J Bryant 2-4 (0-2f); C Flynn 1-0; A Kellaghan 0-2 (1m); L Pearson, M Tynan (f), C Egan, K O’Neill 0-1 each.	Referee: L Devenney (Mayo)

7 August 2021 Semi-final	Roscommon	2-13 (19) - (13) 1-10	Down	Kingspan Breffni Park
	D Cregg 0-5 (0-1f), J Fitzpatrick & A McDermott 1-1 each, B O’Carroll (0-1f) & P Gavin 0-2 each, R Dolan & C Carthy 0-1 each.	Report	S Johnston 1-0, C Smyth (0-2f), A Gilmore (0-1f), R O’Hare (0-1f), D Magill 0-2 each, J McGovern & T Smyth 0-1 each.	Referee: D Murnane (Cork)

==== Final ====
15 August 2021 Final	Offaly	1-14 (17) - (14) 1-11	Roscommon	Croke Park
	Jack Bryant 1-2, Morgan Tynan 0-4 (0-3f), Aaron Kelleghan 0-4 (0-1f), Cathal Donoghue and Cormac Egan 0-2 each	Report	Daire Cregg (0-5 (0-3f), Adam McDermott 1-2, Ben O'Carroll 0-2 (0-1f), Charlie Carthy and Jason Doory 0-1 each	Referee: Sean Hurson (Tyrone)

== Statistics ==
=== Top scorers ===
Top scorers overall

Rank	Player	County	Tally	Total	Matches	Average
1	Jack Bryant	Offaly	4-22	34	5	6.80
2	Daire Cregg	Roscommon	0-28	28	5	5.60
3	James Fitzpatrick	Roscommon	5-07	22	5	4.40
3	Adam McDermott	Roscommon	4-10	22	5	4.40
5	Seán O'Connor	Tipperary	2-15	21	3	7.00
6	Ben McGauren	Westmeath	1-17	20	3	6.66
7	David Buckley	Cork	0-18	18	3	6.00
8	Andrew Gilmore	Down	2-08	14	4	3.50
9	Fionn Murray	Dublin	1-10	13	3	4.33
9	Ben O'Carroll	Roscommon	1-10	13	5	2.60

Top scorers in a single game

Rank	Player	County	Tally	Total	Opposition
1	Ben McGauren	Westmeath	1-10	13	Kildare
2	Tom O'Connell	Waterford	3-01	10	Clare
2	Conor Corbett	Cork	2-04	10	Kerry
2	Jack Bryant	Offaly	2-04	10	Cork
2	David Buckley	Cork	0-10	10	Tipperary
6	Donnach Swinburne	Monaghan	3-00	9	Donegal
6	Jack Duggan	Longford	1-06	9	Westmeath
6	Daire Cregg	Roscommon	0-09	9	Leitrim
9	Seán O'Connor	Tipperary	2-02	8	Cork
9	James Fitzpatrick	Roscommon	2-02	8	Sligo
9	Jay Hughes	Louth	2-02	8	Longford
9	Keelin McGann	Longford	1-05	8	Louth
9	Shane Pettit	Wexford	1-05	8	Offaly
9	Seán Jones	Monaghan	0-08	8	Down
