= Daniel Goulding =

Irish sportsperson (born 1986)

Personal information
- Native name: Dónall de Gúl (Irish)
- Nickname: Danny G
- Born: 6 July 1986 (age 40) Ovens, County Cork, Ireland
- Occupation: Bord Gáis employee
- Height: 6 ft 1 in (185 cm)

Sport
- Sport: Gaelic football
- Position: Right corner-forward
Club
- Years: Club
- 2003–present: Éire Óg
Club titles
- Cork titles: 0
Inter-county*
Years	County	Apps (scores)
2006–2016	Cork	41 (9–148)
Inter-county titles
- Munster titles: 2
- All-Irelands: 1
- NFL: 2
- All Stars: 1
- *Inter County team apps and scores correct as of 16:02, 26 July 2014.

Daniel Goulding (born 6 July 1986 in Ovens, County Cork, Ireland) is an Irish sportsperson. He began playing Gaelic football with his local club Éire Óg and was a member of the Cork senior inter-county team since 2006 until announcing his retirement in October 2016.

== Biography ==
Born in Ovens, County Cork, Goulding was educated at the local national school before later attending Coláiste Choilm in nearby Ballincollig. Here he became a star on the school football team, winning Cork colleges and Munster honours in all grades.

Goulding later studied structural engineering at the Cork Institute of Technology (CIT) and qualified with a first class honours degree in 2008. He subsequently received funding from the Environmental Protection Agency to research in the area of renewable energy and has completing his PhD on a part-time basis while working for Bord Gáis.

During his tenure at CIT Goulding played with the institute's football team that reached their first inter-varsitites final in 2009. A 1–16 to 1–10 defeat of Dublin Institute of Technology, with Goulding top scoring with nine points, gave him a Sigerson Cup winners' medal.

== Playing career ==
=== Club ===
Goulding plays his club hurling and football with the Éire Óg club and has enjoyed much success.

After beginning his club career as a member of the Éire Óg under-6 team, Goulding made it onto the club's minor team by 2002. That year he won a county minor championship following a defeat of Carrigaline in the county final.

By 2008 Goulding had become a key forward on Éire Óg's top team. He won a Mid Cork title that year following a one-goal victory over Dripsey. Goulding's side later claimed the county junior championship following a 1–8 to 1–5 defeat of Ballygarvan.

In 2014 he helped his side to win the Cork Intermediate Football Championship after a convincing 0–14 to 0–06 win over Rockchapel in the final.

In 2019 he won a Cork Premier Intermediate Football Championship after a win over St Michael's.

He was captain of the 2020 Cork Senior A Football Championship winning team when Éire Óg overcame Mallow in the delayed final due to the Impact of the COVID-19 pandemic on Gaelic games played in June 2021.

=== Minor and under-21 ===
Goulding first played for Cork as a member of the county's minor team in 2003/2004, however, he enjoyed little success in this grade as Kerry dominated the provincial series at the time.

2005 saw Goulding join the Cork under-21 team. Success was instant as he collected a Munster title following a three-point victory over Limerick. Cork were later beaten by Galway in the All-Ireland semi-final.

Goulding added a second Munster under-21 title to his collection in 2006 following a 4–14 to 1–6 trouncing of Waterford. He later lined out in the All-Ireland final against Mayo, however, it was the westerners who claimed the championship with a two-point victory.

2007 was Goulding's last year as a member of the Cork under-21 team. He won a third consecutive Munster title that year following a 3–19 to 3–12 defeat of Tipperary. Cork later reached the All-Ireland final with Down providing the opposition. Another close and exciting game of football developed as neither side took a decisive lead. Colm O'Neill and Goulding combined to score two goals and to help Cork to a narrow 2–10 to 0–15 victory. It was his 's first All-Ireland winners' medal at under-21 level.

=== Junior ===
In 2005 he was part of the Cork Junior team. It was a successful season has a win over Kerry seen him pick up a Munster Junior Football Championship. Cork later qualified for the All-Ireland Junior Football Championship final where they faced Meath. In the end Cork won the title on a 0–10 to 1–04 scoreline to give Goulding an All-Ireland medal.

=== Senior ===
In 2006 Goulding made his senior debut for Cork when he came on as a substitute and scored a goal in a National Football League game against Offaly. Later that year he made his championship debut against Limerick but did not plays any part in Cork's Munster final victory over Kerry.

Goulding was still a peripheral member of the team again in 2007 as Cork reached their first All-Ireland final since 1999. Age-old rivals Kerry were the opponents in the first all-Munster All-Ireland final and although Goulding didn't start the game, he came on as a substitute. It was a game to forget for Cork as Kerry triumphed by 3–13 to 1–9.

In 2008 Goulding became a regular member of Cork's starting fifteen as 'the Rebels' gained a modicum of revenge on Kerry when the sides met in that year's Munster final. Kerry were cruising by eight points at the interval, however, Cork stormed back in the second-half. Kerry could only muster three points as Cork secured a remarkable 1–16 to 1–11 victory. It was Goulding's 's first Munster winners' medal. Both sides met again in the All-Ireland semi-final, however, after a thrilling draw and a replay Kerry were the team that advanced to the championship decider.

Cork reached the National League division 2 final in 2009, having recorded only one defeat in the seven group stage games. Monaghan provided the opposition, however, Cork won the game by 1–14 to 0–12. It was Goulding's first National League title. He later claimed a second Munster winners' medal following a narrow 2–6 to 0–11 defeat of Limerick. Cork later qualified for the All-Ireland final where arch-rivals Kerry provided the opposition for the second time in three years. Surprisingly, the men from 'the Kingdom' went into the game as slight underdogs. This tag appeared to be justified when Cork raced to a 1–3 to 0–1 early in the opening half. The Kerry team stuck to their game plan, helped in no small part by a Cork side that recorded fourteen wides. At the final whistle Kerry were the champions by 0–16 to 1–9. There was some consolation for Goulding as he collected his very first All-Star award.

2010 saw Cork bounce back from the All-Ireland defeat by claiming the top flight National League title with a 1–17 to 0–12 defeat of Mayo in the final. It was Goulding's first division one National League title. Cork were later defeated by Kerry in the provincial series but qualified for a second consecutive All-Ireland final by taking the scenic route through the qualifiers. Down provided the opposition and a tight game developed on a rain-soaked day. Goulding top scored with nine points and was named man of the match as Cork triumphed by 0–16 to 0–15. It was Goulding's first All-Ireland winners' medal and Cork's first championship title in twenty years.

In 2011 Cork retained their status as top flight National League champions following a 0–21 to 2–14 defeat of Dublin in the final. It was Goulding's second winners' medal in that competition. Cork later qualified for their first Munster final in two years, however, Kerry retained their provincial with a 1–15 to 1–12 victory.

=== Inter-provincial ===
Goulding has also lined out with Munster in the now defunct inter-provincial series of games. He was first included on the panel in 2007, however, he was a non-playing substitute as Munster were defeated by Ulster.

Goulding was at right corner-forward in 2008 when Munster defeated Connacht by 1–09 to 0–7 to take their first Railway Cup title since 1999.

In 2009 Goulding had the distinction of being named at full-forward on the very last Munster team to represent the province in the Railway Cup. For the second time in three years Munster were beaten by Ulster.

Awards
Preceded by Tom O'Sullivan (Kerry)	All-Ireland Senior Football Final; Man of the Match; 2010	Succeeded by Kevin Nolan (Dublin)
