= Tadhg Deasy =

Irish hurler (born 1998)

Personal information
- Native name: Tadhg Déiseach (Irish)
- Born: 1998 (age 27–28) Blackrock, Cork, Ireland

Sport
- Sport: Hurling
- Position: Center Forward
Club
Years	Club	Apps (scores)
2016-present	Blackrock	25 (8-44)
Club titles
- Cork titles: 1
College
- Years: College
- University College Cork
College titles
- Fitzgibbon titles: 1
Inter-county*
Years	County	Apps (scores)
2021-	Cork	05 (0-00)
Inter-county titles
- Munster titles: 0
- All-Irelands: 0
- NHL: 0
- All Stars: 0
- *Inter County team apps and scores correct as of 21:52, 7 May 2021.

Tadhg Deasy (born 1998) is an Irish dual player who plays hurling with Blackrock and Gaelic football with St. Michael's. He is a former member of the Cork senior hurling team.

== Career statistics ==
=== Club ===
As of match played 11 September 2022.

Team	Year	Cork PSHC	
Team	Year	Apps	Score
Blackrock	2016	2	1-00
Blackrock	2017	3	0-01
Blackrock	2018	4	2-08
Blackrock	2019	2	0-04
Blackrock	2020	5	2-15
Blackrock	2021	5	1-03
Blackrock	2022	4	2-13
Career total		25	8-44

=== Inter-county ===
As of match played 13 June 2021.

Team	Year	National League			Munster		All-Ireland		Total	
Team	Year	Division	Apps	Score	Apps	Score	Apps	Score	Apps	Score
Cork	2021	Division 1A	4	0-00	0	0-00	1	0-00	5	0-00
Career total			4	0-00	0	0-00	1	0-00	5	0-00

== Honours ==
Blackrock

- Cork Premier Senior Hurling Championship: 2020
