= David Buckley (Gaelic footballer) =

Irish Gaelic footballer

Personal information
- Native name: Daithí Ó Buachalla (Irish)
- Nickname: Big Chesty Bucks
- Born: October 2001 (age 24–25) Newcestown, County Cork, Ireland
- Occupation: Student

Sport
- Sport: Gaelic Football
- Position: Left wing-forward
Club
- Years: Club
- 2019-present: Newcestown
Club titles
- Cork titles: 0
College
- Years: College
- MTU Cork
College titles
- Sigerson titles: 0
Inter-county*
Years	County	Apps (scores)
2022-	Cork	0 (0-00)
Inter-county titles
- Munster titles: 0
- All-Irelands: 0
- NFL: 0
- All Stars: 0
- *Inter County team apps and scores correct as of 16:26, 30 January 2022.

David Buckley (born October 2001) is an Irish Gaelic footballer who plays at club level with Newcetsown and at inter-county level with the Cork senior football team.

== Career ==
Buckley first came to prominence as a dual player at juvenile and underage levels with the Newcestown club. He was part of the Newcestown minor teams that claimed a minor double in 2019, while also making his senior team debut that year. Buckley first appeared on the inter-county scene as a member of the Cork minor football team in 2018. He later won a Munster Championship title with the under-20 side. Buckley was first selected for the Cork senior football team for the pre-season McGrath Cup competition in 2022. He later earned inclusion on the team's National League panel.

== Career statistics ==
As of match played 30 January 2022.

Team	Year	National League			Munster		All-Ireland		Total	
Team	Year	Division	Apps	Score	Apps	Score	Apps	Score	Apps	Score
Cork	2022	Division 2	1	0-01	0	0-00	0	0-00	1	0-01
Total			1	0-01	0	0-00	0	0-00	1	0-01

== Honours ==
Newcestown

- Cork Senior A Hurling Championship: 2023

Cork

- Munster Under-20 Football Championship: 2021
