= 2020 Cork Senior A Football Championship =

- Dates: 24 July 2020 – 19 June 2021
- Teams: 12
- Sponsor: Bon Secours Hospital
- Champions: Éire Óg (1st title); Daniel Goulding (captain); Harry O'Reilly (manager)
- Runners-up: Mallow; Eoin Stanton (captain); Keith Moynihan (manager)
- Relegated: St. Nicholas'

Tournament statistics
- Matches played: 24
- Goals scored: 57 (2.38 per match)
- Points scored: 523 (21.79 per match)
- Top scorer(s): Daniel Goulding (2-34)

The 2020 Cork Senior A Football Championship was the inaugural staging of the Cork Senior A Football Championship since its establishment by the Cork County Board. The draw for the group stage placings took place on 19 November 2019. The championship was scheduled to begin in April 2020, however, it was postponed indefinitely due to the impact of the COVID-19 pandemic on Gaelic games. The championship eventually began on 24 July 2020 and, after being suspended once again on 5 October 2020, eventually concluded on 19 June 2021.

The final was played on 19 June 2021 at Páirc Uí Chaoimh in Cork, between Éire Óg and Mallow, in what was their second meeting in that year's championship but their first meeting in a final in any grade. Éire Óg won the match by 2-13 to 1-07 to claim their first championship title and their second successive promotion.

Éire Óg's Daniel Goulding was the championship's top scorer with 2-34.

== Overview ==
=== Format ===
On 26 March 2019, three championship proposals were circulated to Cork club delegates after an expensive review process of the entire Cork championship system. A core element running through all three proposals, put together by the Cork GAA games workgroup, was that there be a group stage of 12 teams, as well as straight relegation and promotion. On 2 April 2019, a majority of 136 club delegates voted for Option A which provided for one round of games played in April and two more in August – all with inter-county players available.

=== Participating teams ===
Team	Location	Colours
Bandon	Bandon	Yellow and white
Bantry Blues	Bantry	Blue and white
Béal Átha'n Ghaorthaidh	Ballingeary	Black and red
Clyda Rovers	Mourne Abbey	Black and yellow
Dohenys	Dunmanway	Green and white
Éire Óg	Oven	Red and yellow
Fermoy	Fermoy	Black and yellow
Kiskeam	Kiskeam	Black and white
Mallow	Mallow	Red and yellow
O'Donovan Rossa	Skibbereen	Red and white
St Michael's	Blackrock	Green and yellow
St. Nicholas'	Blackpool	Black and white

== Group A ==
=== Table ===
Advance to play-offs Advance to relegation play-offs

Team	Matches				Score			Pts
Team	Pld	W	D	L	For	Against	Diff	Pts
O'Donovan Rossa	3	3	0	0	7-52	5-27	31	6
St Michael's	3	2	0	1	8-43	4-32	23	4
Béal Átha'n Ghaorthaidh	3	1	0	2	2-39	4-46	-13	2
St. Nicholas'	3	0	0	3	3-23	7-52	-41	0

=== Results ===
25 July 2020 Round 1	O'Donovan Rossa	4-22 - 1-05	St. Nicholas'	Brinny Sportsfield
	K Davis 1-8 (0-1f, 0-1 ‘mark’); D Óg Hodnett 2-1; D Shannon 0-5 (0-1 ‘mark’; 0-1 ‘45’); E Connolly 0-3; D Hourihane 1-1; T Hegarty, S Fitzgerald, D Daly, R Byrne 0-1 each.	Report	D Brosnan 1-2 (0-1f, 0-1 ‘mark); L Coughlan 0-2; A Lynch 0-1.	Referee: E Sheehy (Newcestown)

25 July 2020 Round 1	St Michael's	3-16 - 0-14	Béal Átha'n Ghaorthaidh	Ovens
	E Buckley 1-4, A Hennessy 0-3, D Lenihan, K Hegarty 1-0 each, T Deasy 0-3 (0-1 f), L Grainger 0-2, A O'Connell, T Lenihan, E Hegarty, D Meaney 0-1 each.	Report	D Mac Thomáis 0-5, B Searten 0-4 (0-3 f), C Ó Loingsigh 0-2 (0-1 45), D Searten 0-2, M Ó Riordáin 0-1.	Referee: M Collins (Clonakilty)

15 August 2020 Round 2	O'Donovan Rossa	0-17 - 1-10	Béal Átha'n Ghaorthaidh	Randal Óg Park
	D Hourihane (0-6, 4 frees); D Óg Hodnett and D Shannon (1 mark, 1 45) (0-4 each); R Byrne (0-2); E Fitzgerald (0-1).	Report	B Searten (1-4); D Mac Tomáis (0-6, 2 frees).	Referee: T Hayes (Éire Óg)

16 August 2020 Round 2	St. Nicholas'	1-05 - 2-15	St Michael's	Caherlag Sportsfield
	S Kennefick (1-1), D Brosnan (0-3 frees), A Lynch (0-1).	Report	L Grainger (1-1), L O’Sullivan (1-0), E Buckley (0-3), L Grainger, K Hegarty, A O’Connell (1 free), E O’Donovan (0-2 each), E Hegarty, M O’Keeffe, D Meaney (0-1 each).	Referee: J Murphy (Castletownroche)

6 September 2020 Round 3	O'Donovan Rossa	3-13 - 3-12	St Michael's	St. Mary's Park
	D Shannon (1-2, 1f), K Davis (0-5, 2f), T Hegarty and D Daly (1-0 each), D Hourihane (0-2), E Connolly, D Óg Hodnett, S Fitzgerald, R Byrne 0-1 each.	Report	T Deasy (0-5, 1f), E Hegarty (1-1), A O’Connell and A Hennessy (1-0 each), D MEaney, E Buckley, L Grainger, K Hegarty, T Lenihan and L O’Sullivan (0-1 each).

6 September 2020 Round 3	St. Nicholas'	1-13 - 1-15	Béal Átha'n Ghaorthaidh	Carrigadrohid
	S Kennefick 1- 2, D Brosnan (1f), D Brosnan (1f), A Lynch, L Coughlan 0-2 each, J Morrissey, A Hosford, K McCarthy Goade 0-1.	Report	D Mac Tomáis 0-6, C Ó Loingsigh 0-3, S Ó Tuama 1-0, D Seartan 0-3, B Seartan 0-2, M Ó Riordáin 0-1.

== Group B ==
=== Table ===
Advance to play-offs Advance to relegation play-offs

Team	Matches				Score			Pts
Team	Pld	W	D	L	For	Against	Diff	Pts
Mallow	3	2	0	1	3-36	3-28	8	4
Éire Óg	3	2	0	1	2-33	1-31	5	4
Kiskeam	3	2	0	1	4-29	3-34	-2	4
Bantry Blues	3	0	0	3	1-27	3-32	-11	0

=== Results ===
25 July 2020 Round 1	Éire Óg	0-13 - 0-07	Bantry Blues	Ballingeary
	D Goulding (0-5 f, 0-1 sl, 0-1 45) 0-8, C O’Callaghan 0-2, B Hurley, E O’Shea, L Sheehan 0-1 each.	Report	T Foley 0-3 f, A Coakley 0-2, S O’Leary, J Casey 0-1 each.

25 July 2020 Round 1	Kiskeam	2-11 - 1-11	Mallow	Kanturk
	T O’Sullivan (1-3, 0-1 free), S O’Sullivan (0-4), G Casey (1-0), T Casey (0-2, 0-1 free), A Carroll and M Herlihy (0-1 each).	Report	E Kelleher (1-1), K Sheehan (0-4, 0-1 free), R Harkin (0-2), K O’Sullivan, M Taylor, S McDonnell and E Stanton (0-1 each).

15 August 2020 Round 2	Mallow	0-14 - 0-07	Éire Óg	Mourne Abbey
	C O’Riordan (0-4, 0-1 free), M O’Rourke (0-2 frees) and K Sheehan (0-3 each), S McDonnell, J Dillon, K O’Sullivan and D Moynihan (0-1 each).	Report	D Goulding (0-4, 0-3 frees), D O’Herlihy, C O’Callaghan and B Hurley (0-1 each).	Referee: M Collins (Clonakilty)

15 August 2020 Round 2	Kiskeam	1-08 - 0-10	Bantry Blues	Clondrohid
	S O’Sullivan (0-4, 0-1 free), G Casey (1-0), T O’Sullivan (0-3, 0-1 frees), A Carroll (0-1).	Report	R Deane (0-4, frees), A Coakley (0-4, 0-1 free), S McSweeney and S Coughlan (0-1 each).

6 September 2020 Round 3	Kiskeam	1-10 - 2-13	Éire Óg	O'Connell Park
	S Meehan (1-1), S O’Sullivan 0-3f, T O’Sullivan 0-3(0-2f), G Casey (0-2), S Scannell (0-1).	Report	D Goulding 2-7(0-1f), J Cooper (0-3), C O’Callaghan (0-2), B Hurley 0-1.

6 September 2020 Round 3	Mallow	2-11 - 1-10	Bantry Blues	Castle Grounds
	C O’Riordan 1-5 (0-3f, 1.sl); E Kelleher 1-0; J Loughrey, M Taylor, E Stanton, K O’Sullivan, J Dillon, P Herlihy 0-1 each.	Report	R Deane 1-5 (0-3f); S McSweeney 0-3; A Coakley 0-2 (0-1f).

== Group C ==
=== Table ===
Advance to play-offs

Team	Matches				Score			Pts
Team	Pld	W	D	L	For	Against	Diff	Pts
Fermoy	3	2	0	1	5-34	4-28	9	4
Bandon	3	1	1	1	3-35	2-31	7	3
Clyda Rovers	3	1	1	1	2-24	4-26	-8	3
Dohenys	3	0	2	1	1-30	1-38	-8	2

=== Results ===
24 July 2020 Round 1	Clyda Rovers	0-06 - 1-12	Bandon	Ballyanley Sportsfield
	C Corbett (2 fs)(0-3); C Flanagan, P Cronin, C O’Sullivan (0-1 each).	Report	M Sugrue (4 fs)(0-7); M O’Regan (1-2); R Crowley (0-2); R O’Driscoll (0-1).

26 July 2020 Round 1	Dohenys	0-10 - 1-15	Fermoy	Coachford
	M Buckley 0-5 (0-4 f), F Herlihy 0-2, J Kelly, C Barry (f), K White 0-1 each.	Report	K Morrisson 1-0, M Brennan 0-4, R O'Hagan (0-2 f), P De Roiste, B O'Sullivan 0-3 each, L Coleman (45), A Aherne 0-1 each.

16 August 2020 Round 2	Dohenys	0-12 - 0-12	Bandon	Páirc Uinsinn
	M Buckley (0-4, 1 free); F Herlihy, K White (0-3 each); C Daly, N Hurley (0-1 each).	Report	M Sugrue (2 frees), D Crowley (0-3 each); B Collins, C O’Mahony, R Crowley (0-2 each).	Referee: A O'Connor (Ballygarvan)

16 August 2020 Round 2	Fermoy	2-06 - 2-07	Clyda Rovers	Mill Field
	M Brennan (2-1), R O’Hagan (0-3, 1 free, 1 mark), P de Róiste (0-2).	Report	C Flanagan (2-0, 1-0 pen), C Corbett (0-4, 2 frees), C O’Sullivan, P Cronin and P Kissane (0-1 each).	Referee: J Regan (Lough Rovers)

6 September 2020 Round 3	Dohenys	1-08 - 0-11	Clyda Rovers	Inniscarra
	M Buckley 1-4, (0-3 f), F Herlihy 0-2, C Barry 0-2, (0-1 f).	Report	C Corbett 0-6, (0-4 f), S Ronayne 0-2, E Walsh 0-1, P Cronin 0-1 45, C Flanagan 0-1 f.

6 September 2020 Round 3	Fermoy	2-13 - 2-11	Bandon	Glanmire
	R O’Hagan (0-6, 5 frees), B O’Sulliavn (1-1, 1-0 penalty), A Aherne (1-0), P de Róiste (0-3), K Morrison (0-2), M Brennan (0-1).	Report	B Collins (2-4), M Sugrue (0-4, all frees), M Cahalane (0-2), P Crowley (0-1).

== Knockout stage ==
=== Relegation playoff ===
18 September 2020 Playoff	St. Nicholas'	0-02 - 3-15	Bantry Blues	Sam Maguire Park
	D Morris (0-2f).	Report	A Coakley (1-8, 0-3 frees), R Deane (1-1), S McSweeney (1-0), S Coughlan (0-1 45’, 0-1 free) and B Foley (0-2 each), S Murray and T Cronin (0-1 each).

=== Quarter-finals ===
20 September 2020 Quarter-final	Mallow	2-16 - 2-10	Bandon	Blarney Sportsfield
	C O’Riordan (1-5, 0-1 free), D Moynihan (1-0), R Harkin, J Dillon, E Stanton (0-2), J Loughrey, K O’Sullivan, M O’Rourke (free), P Herlihy, K Sheehan (0-1 each).	Report	M Sugrue (1-5, 0-1 free, 0-1 45), P Crowley (1-0), Darren Crowley (0-3), R Crowley, B Collins (0-1 each).

20 September 2020 Quarter-final	St Michael's	0-04 - 3-12	Éire Óg	Ballyanley Sportsfield
	A O’Connell (0-2, 1 free), E Buckley (free), T Deasy (0-1 each).	Report	D Goulding (0-9, 2 frees), K Hallissey (2-0), C O’Callaghan (1-1), B Hurley, J Kelleher (0-1 each).

=== Semi-finals ===
27 September 2020 Semi-final	Fermoy	0-09 - 0-12	Mallow	Glanworth Sportsfield
	R O’Hagan (0-4, frees); K Morrison (0-2); L Coleman (45), P De Róiste, M Brennan (0-1 each).	Report	C O’Riordan (0-5, 2 frees); K O’Sullivan (0-3), R Harkin (0-2, 1 45); M O’Rourke, K Sheehan (0-1 each).

4 October 2020 Semi-final	O'Donovan Rossa	1-08 - 2-10	Éire Óg	Ahamilla Sportsground
	D Óg Hodnett (1-2), D Hourihane (0-3, 0-2 frees), K Davis, D Shannon and S Fitzgerald (0-1 each).	Report	C O’Callaghan (1-3), D Goulding (0-5, 0-2 frees), D Foley (1-0), E O’Shea and K Hallissey (0-1 each).

=== Final ===
19 June 2021 Final	Mallow	1-07 - 2-13	Éire Óg	Páirc Uí Chaoimh
	M O'Rourke 1-0, J Loughrey 0-2, K Sheehan, E Stanton, S Hayes, S Merritt, C O'Riordan 0-1 each.	Report	Joe Cooper 1-2, D Foley 1-2, D Goulding 0-4 f, B Hurley 0-2, J Murphy, E O'Shea, D Dineen 0-1 each.	Referee: B Coniry (Crosshaven)

== Championship statistics ==
=== Top scorers ===
Overall

Rank	Player	Club	Tally	Total	Matches	Average
1	Daniel Goulding	Éire Óg	2-34	40	6	6.66
2	Cian O'Riordan	Mallow	2-20	26	5	5.20
3	Mark Sugrue	Bandon	1-19	22	4	5.50
4	Arthur Coakley	Bantry Blues	1-16	19	4	4.75
5	Donal Óg Hodnett	O'Donovan Rossa	3-08	17	4	4.25
5	Kevin Davis	O'Donovan Rossa	1-14	17	3	5.66
5	Diarmuid Mac Tomáis	Béal Átha'n Ghaorthaidh	0-17	17	3	5.66
8	Ruairí Deane	Bantry Blues	2-10	16	3	5.33
8	Mark Buckley	Dohenys	1-13	16	3	5.33
8	Ruairí O'Hagan	Fermoy	0-16	16	4	4.00

In a single game

Rank	Player	Club	Tally	Total	Opposition
1	Daniel Goulding	Éire Óg	2-07	13	Kiskeam
2	Kevin Davis	O'Donovan Rossa	1-08	11	St. Nicholas'
2	Arthur Coakley	Bantry Blues	1-08	11	St. Nicholas'
4	Barry Collins	Bandon	2-04	10	Fermoy
5	Daniel Goulding	Éire Óg	0-09	9	St Michael's
6	Cian O'Riordan	Mallow	1-05	8	Bantry Blues
6	Cian O'Riordan	Mallow	1-05	8	Bandon
6	Ruairí Deane	Bantry Blues	1-05	8	Mallow
6	Mark Sugrue	Bandon	1-05	8	Mallow
10	Martin Brennan	Fermoy	2-01	7	Clyda Rovers
10	Donal Óg Hodnett	O'Donovan Rossa	2-01	7	St. Nicholas'
10	Ben Searten	Béal Átha'n Ghaorthaidh	1-04	7	O'Donovan Rossa
10	Mark Buckley	Dohenys	1-04	7	Clyda Rovers
10	Eoghan Buckley	St Michael's	1-04	7	Béal Átha'n Ghaorthaidh
10	Mark Sugrue	Bandon	0-07	7	Clyda Rovers

=== Miscellaneous ===
- Éire Óg are the first winners of the Senior A Championship.
