= Kevin Davis (Gaelic footballer) =

Irish Gaelic footballer

Personal information
- Born: 1994 (age 31–32) Skibbereen, County Cork, Ireland
- Occupation: Accountant
- Height: 5 ft 10 in (178 cm)

Sport
- Sport: Gaelic football
- Position: Left corner-forward
Club
- Years: Club
- 2012-present: O'Donovan Rossa
Club titles
- Cork titles: 0
College
- Years: College
- 2012-2016: University College Cork
College titles
- Sigerson titles: 1
Inter-county*
Years	County	Apps (scores)
2017	Cork	0 (0-00)
Inter-county titles
- Munster titles: 0
- All-Irelands: 0
- NFL: 0
- All Stars: 0
- *Inter County team apps and scores correct as of 12:37, 11 June 2023.

Kevin Davis (born 1994) is an Irish Gaelic football player. At club level he plays with O'Donovan Rossa, while he has also lined out at inter-county level with various Cork teams.

== Career ==
Davis first played Gaelic football to a high standard as a student at St Fachtna's De La Salle College in Skibbereen. He also lined out at juvenile and underage levels with the O'Donovan Rossa club, winning a Cork U21FC medal in 2011, before joining the club's senior team the following year. Davis was also part of the University College Cork team that won the Sigerson Cup in 2014.

Davis first appeared on the inter-county scene with Cork as a member of the minor team in 2012. He later lined out with the under-21 team and was a member of the extended panel when Cork won the Munster U21FC title in 2014. Davis joined the Cork senior football team during the 2017 McGrath Cup and made a number of appearances in the subsequent National League.

== Personal life ==
His father, Don Davis, and his uncle, Tony Davis, also played with O'Donovan Rossa and Cork.

== Honours ==
UCC

- Sigerson Cup: 2014

O'Donovan Rossa

- Cork Under-21 Football Championship: 2011

Cork

- Munster Under-21 Football Championship: 2014
