= St Michael's Gaelic Football Club =

Gaelic games club in Cork, Ireland

- Micheál Naofa
- Founded: 1951
- County: Cork
- Colours: Yellow and Green
- Grounds: Páirc Mhichíl Naofa
- Coordinates: 51°53′23″N 8°23′36″W

Playing kits
Standard colours

St Michael's Gaelic Football Club is a Gaelic football club in Cork City, Ireland. Championship titles won by the club include Cork Intermediate Football Championship titles (in 1969 and 1998) and a Cork Senior A Football Championship title (in 2022).

== History ==
The club was formed in 1951 after a discussion in the Leaping Salmon public house in Blackrock. At that time, some of the hurlers from Blackrock GAA club were playing Gaelic football with different city teams. It was decided to keep the players together by forming a football team to represent the Blackrock area. A formal meeting was held and St Michael's Gaelic Football Club was established.

St Michael's first match was against Crosshaven, with Jimmy Furlong as captain. The club's first success was in 1956 when St Michael's took their first Cork Junior Football Championship title, and as there was no Intermediate Championship or League the club decided to go Senior in 1957. The club failed to win a Senior County title in 1976, 1977, and 1978, but competed in finals during these years against St Finbarr's and Nemo Rangers, and won two Kelleher Shield titles. Eventually the decision was made to drop down to Intermediate level.

1964 and 1965 saw the first honours to the younger members of the club with Minor titles in the county championships, and the best result at this level was in 1974 when the club won city and county league and championships.

In 1998, the club won the Cork Intermediate Football Championship, beating St Finbarr's in the final for their second Intermediate title (after their first in 1969), returning the club to the Senior ranks.

St Michael's underage section began in the 1960s.

== Championship grades ==
As of 2021, the St Michael's (football) and Blackrock (hurling) were competing at the following grades:

Hurling (Blackrock)	Current grade
First team	Premier Senior
Second team	Premier Intermediate
Third team	City Junior A
Fourth team	City Junior B
U21 team	U21 Premier 1
Football (St Michael's)	Current grade
First team	Premier Senior
Second team	City Junior A
Third team	City Junior B
U21 team	City U21 A

== Honours ==
- Cork Senior Football Championship (0): (runners-up in 1976, 1977, 1978)
- Cork Senior A Football Championship (1): 2022
- Kelleher Shield (Senior Football League) (2): 1976, 1978
- Kelleher Shield Div 3 (1): 2009
- Cork Premier Intermediate Football Championship (0): (runners-up in 2012, 2015, 2017, 2018, 2019)
- Cork Intermediate Football Championship (2): 1969, 1998
- Cork Junior Football Championship (1): 1956
- Cork Minor Football Championship (7): 1938 (as Blackrock), 1964, 1965, 1974, 2006, 2008 & 2018
- Cork Junior B Inter-Divisional Football Championship (1): 2019
- Cork City Junior Football Championship (6): 1952, 1953, 1956, 1987, 2019, 2022
- Munster Club Division 2 Championship (1): 2005
- Cork City Under-21 Football Championship (2): 1976, 2006
- Cork Under-21 Football Championship (2): 1976, 2019
- City Minor Premier Football Championship (1): 1974
- City Minor A City Football Championship (3): 1999, 2002, 2009

== Notable players ==
- Ray Cummins
- Billy Field
