= 2002 Cork Senior Football Championship =

Gaelic football competition

- Dates: 7 April 2002 – 6 October 2002
- Teams: 29
- Sponsor: TSB Bank
- Champions: Nemo Rangers (13th title); Colin Corkery (captain); Billy Morgan (manager)
- Runners-up: Bishopstown; John Egan (manager)

Tournament statistics
- Matches played: 40
- Top scorer(s): Colin Corkery (2-33)

The 2002 Cork Senior Football Championship was the 114th staging of the Cork Senior Football Championship since its establishment by the Cork County Board in 1887. The draw for the opening fixtures took place on 9 December 2001. The championship began on 7 April 2002 and ended on 6 October 2002.

Nemo Rangers entered the championship as the defending champions.

On 6 October 2002, Nemo Rangers won the championship following a 0-15 to 1-07 defeat of Bishopstown in the final. This was their 13th championship title overall and their second title in succession.

Colin Corkery from the Nemo Rangers club was the championship's top scorer with 2-33.

== Results ==
=== Preliminary round ===
7 April 2002 Preliminary round	Newcestown	0-10 - 1-11	Mallow	Donoughmore
	P Condon 0-5, J O'Sullivan 0-3, E Twomey 0-1, C O'Donvan 0-1.		M O'Sullivan 1-2, P Dineen 0-3, N Dinan 0-3, P O'Riordan 0-1, M O'Brien 0-1, A Ahern 0-1.	Referee: P Higgins (Ballincollig)

=== First round ===
12 April 2002 First round	St Michael's	0-05 - 1-08	Naomh Abán	Carrigadrohid
	J O'Flynn 0-3, B O'Keeffe 0-1, M Mulconroy 0-1.		D Cronin 1-1, M Cronin 0-3, SF Cronin 0-1, J McCarthy 0-1, J Lynch 0-1, D Cronin 0-1.

13 April 2002 First round	St. Nicholas'	1-08 - 1-08	Newcestown	Ovens
	N Byrne 1-1, P Brosnan 0-3, J Anderson 0-2, P McCarthy 0-1, T Murphy 0-1.		P Condon 0-4, C O'Donovan 1-0, J O'Sullivan 0-3, A O'Sullivan 0-1.

13 April 2002 First round	Clyda Rovers	0-07 - 1-05	Douglas	Glenville
	D O'Brien 0-2, P Holland 0-2, F Dorgan 0-1, N O'Mullane 0-1, D O'Shea 0-1.		J Farrell 1-1, W Coveney 0-3, C McCarthy 0-1.

13 April 2002 First round	Clonakilty	3-03 - 1-08	Aghada	Ballincollig
	P Griffin 1-1, D Lyons 1-0, C O'Donovan 1-0, C Murphy 0-2.		T O'Keeffe 0-4, JP O'Connor 1-0, J O'Connell 0-2, R Dwane 0-1, M Lewis 0-1.

13 April 2002 First round	Na Piarsaigh	3-05 - 0-04	Bantry Blues	Annahala
	K Butterworth 2-0, J Gardiner 1-1, S McLoughlin 0-2, S Glasgow 0-1, D Gardiner 0-1.		D Barron 0-2, D O'Neill 0-1, G Carey 0-1.

14 April 2002 First round	Bishopstown	0-12 - 2-06	Ballincollig	Ballyanley
	J O'Shea 0-4, M Hayes 0-2, M Cogan 0-2, C Lucey 0-2, B Healy 0-1, R Honohan 0-1.		P O'Mahony 1-1, J Miskella 1-0, F Keohane 0-2, L O'Toole 0-1, JP O'Shea 0-1, J O'Brien 0-1.

14 April 2002 First round	Dohenys	2-06 - 2-08	Nemo Rangers	Charlie Hurley Park, Bandon
	K Farr 2-0, D Nyhan 0-3, S Farr 0-1, T O'Donovan 0-1, S Lordan 0-1.		J Kavanagh 1-1, A Cronin 1-1, C Corkery 0-3, D Kavanagh 0-1, A Morgan 0-1, J Masters 0-1.

14 April 2002 First round	O'Donovan Rossa	2-15 - 0-09	Youghal	Ballygarvan
	J O'Driscoll 1-3, J Werner 1-3, D Davis 0-4, M McCarthy 0-2, D O'Sullivan 0-2, C McCarthy 0-1.		P Moylan 0-6, JP Joyce 0-1, K Coleman 0-1.

14 April 2002 First round	St. Finbarr's	0-12 - 1-11	Castlehaven	Charlie Hurley Park, Bandon
	F Murray 0-5, K Kelleher 0-2, N Horgan 0-1, C McCarthy 0-1, A O'Shea 0-1, J O'Donoghue 0-1, P McSweeney 0-1.		C Crowley 1-5, P Hurley 0-4, D Burns 0-1, S Hurley 0-1.

21 April 2002 First round replay	Bishopstown	0-12 - 1-04	Ballincollig	Ballyanley
	J O'Shea 0-4, M Cogan 0-3, L Honohan 0-1, B Healy 0-1, J Murphy 0-1, R Honohan 0-1.		J Miskella 1-2, C Weste 0-2.

31 May 2002 First round replay	St. Nicholas'	2-09 - 0-09	Newcestown	Ovens
	J Anderson 1-2, R Brosnan 0-5, E McCarthy 1-0, E Neville 0-1, T O'Sullivan 0-1.		P Condon 0-5, J O'Sullivan 0-2, E Twomey 0-1, T Twomey 0-1.

=== Second round ===
20 April 2002 Second round	Seandún	0-06 - 0-15	Carbery	Ballineen
	K O'Brien 0-3, JP Murphy 0-1, S Galvin 0-1, K Buckley 0-1.		F Collins 0-3, B O'Sullivan 0-3, J O'Regan 0-2, F Arundel 0-2, J Whycherley 0-2, P Connolly 0-1, P Hegarty 0-1, K McMahon 0-1.

5 May 2002 Second round	Duhallow	4-11 - 0-09	Beara	Ballyvourney
	M O'Sullivan 3-2, D O'Sullivan 0-4, T O'Keeffe 1-0, R Casey 0-1, D O'Connor 0-1, N O'Sullivan 0-1, A O'Sullivan 0-1, N Cronin 0-1.		C O'Sullivan 0-3, BJ O'Sullivan 0-3, S Spencer 0-1, K O'Neill 0-1, B Power 0-1.

11 May 2002 Second round	Carrigdhoun	1-06 - 1-11	Dohenys	Clonakilty
	R O'Hanlon 1-0, M Kelleher 0-3, J Murphy 0-2, J Buglar 0-1.		F Collins 1-1, D Nyhan 0-4, S Collins 0-2, J Collins 0-2, D O'Sullivan 0-1, S Farr 0-1.

31 May 2002 Second round	Muskerry	0-11 - 2-10	St. Finbarr's	Ballineen
	P Dunlea 0-5, N Twomey 0-1, A Dorgan 0-1, P Kelleher 0-1, P Concannon 0-1, J White 0-1, J Dunlea 0-1.		F Murray 2-5, K Kelleher 0-2, R O'Mahony 0-1, P McSweeney 0-1, J O'Donoghue 0-1.

1 June 2002 Second round	Clyda Rovers	0-10 - 0-08	Youghal	Fermoy
	P Kissane 0-4, F Dorgan 0-2, C O'Sullivan 0-2, P Holland 0-1, N O'Mullane 0-1.		P Moylan 0-5, A Healy 0-1, E Coleman 0-1, S Forrest 0-1.

2 June 2002 Second round	Imokilly	1-08 - 1-13	Bantry Blues	Ballygarvan
	D O'Sullivan 1-2, S O'Farrell 0-2, C O'Sullivan 0-2, P Ryan 0-1, V O'Sullivan 0-1.		P Clifford 1-7, D O'Neill 0-2, D Barron 0-2, J Canty 0-1, S McCarthy 0-1.

7 June 2002 Second round	Avondhu	0-10 - 1-06	St Michael's	Watergrasshill
	J O'Mahony 0-4, E Pierce 0-2, D Moher 0-2, T Higgins 0-1, T Fehin 0-1.		M Mulconroy 0-4, B O'Keeffe 1-0, B Hennebry 0-1, J O'Flynn 0-1.

8 June 2002 Second round	University College Cork	2-13 - 1-08	Aghada	Carrigtwohill
	P Galvin 1-2, T Kenny 0-4, P Murphy 1-0, M D Cahill 0-3, C Galvin 0-2, J Olden 0-2.		M Lewis 0-5, J O'Connell 1-1, T O'Keeffe 0-1, JP O'Connor 0-1.

14 June 2002 Second round	Cork Institute of Technology	2-08 - 1-13	Newcestown	Páirc Uí Rinn, Cork
	DJ Fleming 0-4, V Hurley 1-0, E O'Connor 1-0, S Walsh 0-2, A O'Mahony 0-1, B Dennehy 0-1.		P Condon 0-6, C O'Donovan 1-1, T Twomey 0-2, D McCarthy 0-2, A O'Sullivan 0-1, E Twomey 0-1.

- Ballincollig received a bye in this round.

=== Third round ===
28 June 2002 Third round	St. Finbarr's	1-17 - 2-11	Avondhu	Mourne Abbey
	R o'Mahony 1-4, F Murray 0-6, C McCarthy 0-3, K Kelleher 0-2, N Horgan 0-1, R Curran 0-1.		A O'Driscoll 1-2, E Pierce 1-0, J O'Mahony 0-3, D Moher 0-3, JD Murphy 0-2, T Higgins 0-1.

29 June 2002 Third round	Bishopstown	1-11 - 0-12	O'Donovan Rossa	Charlie Hurley Park, Bandon
	J Crowley 1-2, J O'Shea 0-3, M Hayes 0-2, R Honohan 0-2, J Murphy 0-1, M Cogan 0-1.		J Werner 0-3, D Davis 0-3, R Long 0-3, J O'Driscoll 0-2, C McCarthy 0-1.

29 June 2002 Third round	Ballincollig	0-07 - 2-09	Duhallow	Macroom
	J Miskella 0-2, F Keohane 0-2, M Greene 0-1, P O'Mahony 0-1, D Bourke 0-1.		D O'Connor 1-7, N O'Sullivan 1-1, M O'Sullivan 0-1.

30 June 2002 Third round	Carbery	0-10 - 0-14	Clyda Rovers	Cloughduv
	J O'Regan 0-2, P Hegarty 0-2, F Collins 0-2, B O'Sullivan 0-2, M O'Sullivan 0-1, T Deasy 0-1.		P Holland 0-4, D O'Shea 0-4, P Kissane 0-2, C O'Sullivan 0-1, N O'Mullane 0-1, P O'Mullane 0-1, F Dorgan 0-1.

30 June 2002 Third round	Castlehaven	3-08 - 3-12	Mallow	Cloughduv
	C Crowley 2-2, P Hurley 0-6, B Deasy 1-0.		R Sheehan 1-5, M O'Brien 1-1, T O'Riordan 1-0, A Aherne 0-2, P Dineen 0-2, M Buckley 0-1, J O'Sullivan 0-1.

30 June 2002 Third round	Clonakilty	2-05 - 0-13	Naomh Abán	Kilmurry
	B Walsh 1-1, E O'Brien 1-0, P Griffin 0-2, C Murray 0-1, M Harrington 0-1.		M Ó Cróinín 0-7, J Lynch 0-1, SF Ó Cróinín 0-1, K Lynch 0-1, G Lynch 0-1, J McCarthy 0-1, D O'Sullivan 0-1.

6 July 2002 Third round	Bantry Blues	0-11 - 1-09	Na Piarsaigh	Ballineen
	P Clifford 0-5, G Canty 0-2, P O'Rourke 0-1, E Sheehan 0-1, D Barron 0-1, M Moran 0-1.		K Butterworth 1-1, S Ó hAilpín 0-3, J Gardiner 0-1, D Gardiner 0-1, S O'Sullivan 0-1, S McLoughlin 0-1, C O'Sullivan 0-1.

7 July 2002 Third round	Douglas	0-08 - 2-10	Dohenys	Charlie Hurley Park, Bandon
	J Farrell 0-6, W Coveney 0-2.		F Collins 1-2, D Nyhan 1-2, J Collins 0-2, S Collins 0-1, M Farr 0-1, D O'Sullivan 0-1, S Farr 0-1.

7 July 2002 Third round	University College Cork	0-13 - 0-05	St. Nicholas'	Páirc Uí Rinn, Cork
	MD Cahill 0-4, I Twiss 0-3, P Galvin 0-2, J Olden 0-2, D Reidy 0-1, T Kenny 0-1.		J Anderson 0-2, P O'Brien 0-1, R Brosnan 0-1, T O'Halloran 0-1.

11 August 2002 Third round	Nemo Rangers	1-17 - 0-06	Newcestown	Brinny
	J Kavanagh 1-4, C Corkery 0-7, L O'Sullivan 0-3, A Cronin 0-1, G Murphy 0-1, M Daly 0-1.		D McCarthy 0-3, T Twomey 0-1, E Twomey 0-1, P Condon 0-1.

=== Fourth round ===
21 July 2002 Fourth round	University College Cork	1-08 - 0-09	Dohenys	Newcestown
	E Collins 1-0, C Brosnan 0-3, B Sheehan 0-2, MD Cahill 0-2, P Galvin 0-1.		S Farr 0-4, F Collins 0-2, S Collins 0-1, N Collins 0-1, D Nyhan 0-1.

10 August 2002 Fourth round	Clyda Rovers	2-09 - 0-14	Naomh Abán	Kanturk
	D O'Shea 1-3, P Kissane 1-2, F Dorgan 0-3, P Holland 0-1.		M Ó Cróinín 0-11, J Twomey 0-1, Donncha Ó Cróinín 0-1, Donal Ó Cróinín 0-1.

=== Quarter-finals ===
9 August 2002 Quarter-final	Na Piarsaigh	1-04 - 1-12	Bishopstown	Páirc Uí Chaoimh, Cork
	C O'Sullivan 1-0, D Gardiner 0-2, J Gardiner 0-1, S McLoughlin 0-1.		J Honohan 1-0, J Crowley 0-3, D O'Mahony 0-2, M Cogan 0-2, J Murphy 0-2, R Honohan 0-1, B Hussey 0-1, J O'Shea 0-1.

11 August 2002 Quarter-final	St. Finbarr's	3-12 - 1-07	Duhallow	Coachford
	F Murray 2-7, K Kelleher 1-1, R O'Mahony 0-4.		R Casey 1-0, N Cronin 0-3, T O'Keeffe 0-2, M O'Sullivan 0-1, A O'Sullivan 0-1.

18 August 2002 Quarter-final	University College Cork	0-11 - 1-06	Clyda Rovers	Donoughmore
	V Sheehan 0-3, T Kenny 0-3, C Brosnan 0-2, J Olden 0-1, P Galvin 0-1, D Reidy 0-1.		J Walsh 1-0, P Kissane 0-3, K Cronin 0-1, F Dorgan 0-1, D O'Shea 0-1.

14 September 2002 Quarter-final	Nemo Rangers	4-12 - 0-09	Mallow	Rathcormac
	C Corkery 1-8, J Kavanagh 1-1, A Morgan 1-1, L O'Sullivan 1-0, A Cronin 0-1, J Masters 0-1.		R Sheehan 0-4, P Dineen 0-1, A Aherne 0-1, J O'Sullivan 0-1, M O'Donovan 0-1, M O'Brien 0-1.

=== Semi-finals ===
8 September 2002 Semi-final	Bishopstown	1-10 - 1-07	University College Cork	Páirc Uí Chaoimh, Cork
	R Honohan 1-1, J O'Shea 0-2, R Healy 0-2, J Crowley 0-1, B Cuthbert 0-1, N O'Donovan 0-1, J Honohan 0-1, M Hayes 0-1.		MD Cahill 1-1, C Ó Crualaoich 0-3, I Twiss 0-2, D Reidy 0-1.

21 September 2002 Semi-final	Nemo Rangers	1-12 - 1-08	St. Finbarr's	Páirc Uí Chaoimh, Cork
	C Corkery 1-4, J Kavanagh 0-2, A Cronin 0-2, G Murphy 0-2, K Cahill 0-1, D Kavanagh 0-1.		C McCarthy 1-1, F Murphy 0-3, I Keeler 0-1, K Kelleher 0-1, R Curran 0-1, R O'Mahony 0-1.

=== Final ===
6 October 2002 Final	Nemo Rangers	0-15 - 1-07	Bishopstown	Páirc Uí Chaoimh, Cork
	C Corkery 0-11, A Cronin 0-1, K Cahill 0-1, J Kavanagh 0-1, D Kavanagh 0-1.		J O'Shea 1-4, B Healy 0-1, R Honohan 0-1, J Crowley 0-1.	Attendance: 14,500; Referee: M Collins (Clonakilty)

== Championship statistics ==
=== Top scorers ===
Overall

Rank	Player	Club	Tally	Total	Matches	Average
1	Colin Corkery	Nemo Rangers	2-33	39	5	7.80
2	Fionán Murray	St. Finbarr's	4-26	38	5	7.80
3	James O'Shea	Bishopstown	1-18	21	6	3.50
3	Mícheál Ó Cróinín	Naomh Abán	0-21	21	3	7.00
3	Pádraig Condon	Newcestown	0-21	21	5	4.20
4	Joe Kavanagh	Nemo Rangers	3-09	18	5	3.60
5	Colin Crowley	Castlehaven	3-07	16	2	8.00

In a single game

Rank	Player	Club	Tally	Total	Opposition
1	Fionán Murray	St. Finbarr's	2-07	13	Douglas
2	Mark O'Sullivan	Duhallow	3-02	11	Beara
2	Fionán Murray	St. Finbarr's	2-05	11	Muskerry
2	Colin Corkery	Nemo Rangers	1-08	11	Mallow
2	Mícheál Ó Cróinín	Naomh Abán	0-11	11	Clyda Rovers
2	Colin Corkery	Nemo Rangers	0-11	11	Bishopstown
3	Philip Clifford	Bantry Blues	1-07	10	Imokilly
3	Donncha O'Connor	Duhallow	1-07	10	Ballincollig
4	Colin Crowley	Castlehaven	2-02	8	Mallow
4	Ronan Sheehan	Mallow	1-05	8	Castlehaven
4	Colin Crowley	Castlehaven	1-05	8	St. Finbarr's

=== Miscellaneous ===
- Nemo Rangers are the first club to win three titles in a row since Clonakilty between 1942-44.
- As a result of their victory in the final, Nemo Rangers overtake Lees, who had been top of the all-time roll of honour for 111 years, on the all-time roll of honour with 13 titles.
- Bishopstown qualify for the final for the first time.
