= 2004 Cork Senior Football Championship =

Gaelic football competition

- Dates: 7 April 2004 – 17 October 2004
- Teams: 30
- Sponsor: Permanent TSB
- Champions: Carbery (4th title); Micheál O'Sullivan (captain); John Corcoran (manager)
- Runners-up: Bishopstown; James O'Shea (captain); Paul Montgomery (manager)

Tournament statistics
- Matches played: 44
- Top scorer(s): Fionán Murray (1-30)

The 2004 Cork Senior Football Championship was the 116th staging of the Cork Senior Football Championship since its establishment by the Cork County Board in 1887. The draw for the opening fixtures took place on 14 December 2003. The championship began on 7 April 2004 and ended on 17 October 2004.

Castlehaven entered the championship as the defending champions, however, they were beaten by Mallow in round 4.

On 17 October 2004, Carbery won the championship following a 1-11 to 0-07 defeat of Bishopstown in the final. This was their fourth championship title overall and their first title since 1971.

Fionán Murray from the St. Finbarr's club was the championship's top scorer with 1-30.

== Team changes ==
=== To Championship ===
Promoted from the Cork Intermediate Football Championship

- Ilen Rovers

== Results ==
=== Round 1 ===
7 April 2004 Round 1	Na Piarsaigh	1-10 - 0-13	Bishopstown	Páirc Uí Rinn, Cork
	J Gardiner 0-4, C O'Sullivan 0-4, D Gardiner 1-0, S Glasgow 0-1, C O'Mahony 0-1.		J O'Shea 0-8, S Conlisk 0-3, J Murphy 0-1, M Cogan 0-1.

7 April 2004 Round 1	St. Finbarr's	1-11 - 1-11	O'Donovan Rossa	Páirc Uí Rinn, Cork
	F Murray 1-4, I Keeler 0-2, R O'Mahony 0-1, C McCarthy 0-1, A O'Shea 0-1, J O'Donoghue 0-1, T Olden 0-1.		R Long 1-0, C McCarthy 0-3, E Hodnett 0-3, D O'Regan 0-3, D Davis 0-1, A Tanner 0-1.

10 April 2004 Round 1	Youghal	2-11 - 3-08	Aghada	Ballinacurra
	P Moylan 0-6, K Dempsey 1-2, G O'Leary 1-0, E Coleman 0-1, P Kelly 0-1, S Landers 0-1.		J O'Connell 1-2, JP O'Connor 1-1, B Morrissey 1-0, P O'Neill 0-3, E O'Neill 0-1, T O'Keeffe 0-1.

10 April 2004 Round 1	Newcestown	0-05 - 4-11	Nemo Rangers	Charlie Hurley Park, Bandon
	J O'Sullivan 0-3, P Condon 0-1, T Twomey 0-1.		A Cronin 2-3, J Masters 2-2, J Kavanagh 0-3, D Mehigan 0-1, M Cronin 0-1, M Kearney 0-1.

11 April 2004 Round 1	Castlehaven	1-12 - 1-15	Ilen Rovers	Rossa Park, Skibbereen
	C Crowley 0-6, B Collins 1-1, D Burns 0-3, S Hurley 0-1, A Crowley 0-1.		K O'Sullivan 0-11, B O'Sullivan 1-1, J Whooley 0-1, E Sheehy 0-1, D Duggan 0-1.

11 April 2004 Round 1	Cork Institute of Technology	0-15 - 1-08	Naomh Abán	Kilmurry
	B Sheehan 0-8, DJ Fleming 0-3, V Hurley 0-2, E O'Connor 0-1, K O'Sullivan 0-1.		D Ó Súilleabháin 0-6, S Mac Cárthaigh 1-1, C Ó Tuama 0-1.

11 April 2004 Round 1	Dohenys	0-07 - 0-09	Douglas	Brinny
	R O'Sullivan 0-3, S Farr 0-1, D Healy 0-1, T O'Donovan 0-1, P Collins 0-1.		F O'SUllivan 0-3, J Lane 0-2, G McLoughlin 0-2, S Bermingham 0-1, B Fitzgerald 0-1.

14 April 2004 Round 1	St Michael's	1-11 - 3-08	University College Cork	Páirc Uí Rinn, Cork
	A Ryan 0-7, D O'Connell 1-0, R Downey 0-1, D Gosnell 0-1, M MUlconroy 0-1, B O'Keeffe 0-1.		D O'Sullivan 2-0, B Harty 0-5, C Brosnan 1-1, R Hussey 0-1, K O'Keeffe 0-1.

14 April 2004 Round 1 replay	Na Piarsaigh	1-07 - 0-08	Bishopstown	Páirc Uí Rinn, Cork
	J Gardiner 1-3, C O'Sullivan 0-3, D Gardiner 0-1.		J O'Shea 0-5, J Ferriter 0-2, J Honohan 0-1.

17 April 2004 Round 1	Clonakilty	2-07 - 1-11	St. Nicholas'	Newcestown
	P Griffin 1-0, J Connolly 1-0, C O'Donovan 0-3, C Murphy 0-1, K Meade 0-1, H Kenny 0-1, B Murphy 0-1.		E Kearne 0-7, J Kearney 1-1, R Brosnan 0-1, D Busteed 0-1, E McCarthy 0-1.

17 April 2004 Round 1	Bantry Blues	0-13 - 1-13	Ballincollig	Ballinacarriga
	P Clifford 0-4, D O'Neill 0-3, G Canty 0-2, F Harrington 0-2, D Barron 0-1, S McCarthy 0-1.		M Greene 0-4, J Miskella 0-4, E Crowley 1-0, L O'Toole 0-2, F Keohane 0-2, P O'Mahony 0-1.

17 April 2004 Round 1	Mallow	1-09 - 1-09	Clyda Rovers	Mill Field, Killavullen
	D Lavin 1-1, R Sheehan 0-4, J O'Sullivan 0-2, M O'Brien 0-1, C O'Riordan 0-1.		P Kissane 1-3, G Stack 0-2, J O'Hanlon 0-2, P O'Mullane 0-1, P Aherne 0-1.

17 April 2004 Round 1 replay	Youghal	1-07 - 0-13	Aghada	Ballinacurra
	P Moylan 0-5, P Kelly 1-0, E Coleman 0-1, M Walsh 0-1.		E O'Neill 0-6, B Morrissey 0-2, D Creedon 0-1, P O'Neill 0-1, B Flaherty 0-1, P Crowley 0-1, J O'Connell 0-1.

19 April 2004 Round 1 replay	St. Finbarr's	0-12 - 1-12	O'Donovan Rossa	Clonakilty
	I Keeler 0-5, R O'Mahony 0-4, F Murray 0-2, J o'Donoghue 0-1.		C McCarthy 1-2, D O'Regan 0-3, D Davis 0-2, E Hodnett 0-2, S Crowley 0-1, R Long 0-1, C Keohane 0-1.

21 April 2004 Round 1 replay	Mallow	0-11 - 0-07	Clyda Rovers	Páirc Uí Rinn, Cork
	J O'Sullivan 0-3, A Aherne 0-2, M O'Brien 0-2, C O'Riordan 0-2, T O'Riordan 0-1, R Sheehan 0-1.		G Stack 0-3, P Kissane 0-2, F Dorgan 0-1, D O'Brien 0-1.

=== Round 2 ===
7 May 2004 Round 2	St. Finbarr's	0-09 - 0-06	Clyda Rovers	Donoughmore
	F Murray 0-6, R O'Mahony 0-3.		P Kissane 0-3, F Dorgan 0-1, M Dennehy 0-1, C O'Sullivan 0-1.

16 May 2004 Round 2	St Michael's	1-10 - 1-16	Bantry Blues	Enniskeane
	A Ryan 0-6, M Mulconroy 1-0, C O'Reilly 0-2, G McPolin 0-2.		P Clifford 0-5, D Barron 0-5, P O'Rourke 1-1, D O'Shea 0-2, J Canty 0-2, G Canty 0-1.

22 May 2004 Round 2	Dohenys	3-11 - 1-06	Youghal	Páirc Uí Rinn, Cork
	R O'Sullivan 2-1, S Farr 1-2, D Healy 0-2, D O'Donovan 0-2, M Farr 0-1, John Collins 0-1, Johnny Collins 0-1, M O'Donovan 0-1.		K Coleman 1-0, P Moylan 0-2, K Dempsey 0-2, E Coleman 0-1, M Ó Laochadha 0-1.

23 May 2004 Round 2	Naomh Abán	3-10 - 3-12	Clonakilty	Sam Maguire Park, Dunmanway
	M Ó Cróinín 2-8, D Cronin 1-0, D O'Sullivan 0-1, J McCarthy 0-1.		P Griffin 1-2, C O'Donovan 0-4, B Walsh 0-4, C Murphy 1-0, S Quirke 1-0, Timmy Anglin 0-1, Tony Anglin 0-1.

29 May 2004 Round 2	Newcestown	0-06 - 1-14	Bishopstown	Brinny
	P Condon 0-2, J O'ullivan 0-1, T Twomey 0-1, C Keane 0-1, B Moloney 0-1.		J O'Shea 1-3, J Ferriter 0-5, S Cavanagh 0-2, J Honohan 0-1, S Conlisk 0-1, J Murphy 0-1, R Honohan 0-1.

- Castlehaven received a bye in this round.

=== Divisional section ===
18 April 2004 Round 3	Avondhu	0-07 - 0-6	Imokilly	Rathcormac
	E Pierce 0-3, J Kearney 0-2, P Hickey 0-1, M Kenny 0-1.		M Hopkins 0-2, P Fitzgerald 0-1, D Collins 0-1, S O'Farrell 0-1, V O'Sullivan 0-1.

18 April 2004 Round 3	Seandún	3-05 - 2-17	Beara	Wolfe Tone Park, Bantry
	P Condon 2-2, K O'Brien 1-0, R Scannell 0-1, P Scannell 0-1, E Crowley 0-1.		BJ O'Sullivan 1-5, C Harrignton 1-4, D Lowney 0-4, A O'Regan 0-2, C O'Sullivan 0-2.

24 April 2004 Round 3	Carbery	1-08 - 1-05	Muskerry	Newcestown
	J Hayes 0-4, T Deasy 1-0, A O'Connor 0-1, S Hayes 0-1, F Arundel 0-1, J O'Connell 0-1.		O Murphy 1-0, J Hurley 0-1, J O'Leary 0-1, N Twomey 0-1, C Sheehan 0-1, R Hoare 0-1.

16 May 2004 Round 3	Carrigdhoun	2-06 - 3-11	Duhallow	Shanbally
	E O'Sullivan 1-3, O Conlon 1-0, N Murphy 0-1, E de Barra 0-1, K Ashman 0-1.		D O'Connor 1-5, D O'Sullivan 1-2, R Casey 1-0, N Cronin 0-3, M Reidy 01-.

=== Round 3 ===
19 June 2004 Round 3	Ballincollig	0-09 - 1-09	Carbery	Clonakilty
	J Miskella 0-3, M Greene 0-3, E Bourke 0-1, P O'Mahony 0-1, E Ó Crualaoich 0-1.		P Hegarty 1-2, J Hayes 0-4, S Levis 0-1, M O'Sullivan 0-1, M Cronin 0-1.

1 August 2004 Round 3	Clonakilty	1-13 - 0-15	Nemo Rangers	Charlie Hurley Park, Bandon
	P Griffin 1-2, B Walsh 0-4, C Murphy 0-4, E O'Brien 0-1, T Anglin 0-1, K Meade 0-1.		A Cronin 0-3, J Masters 0-3, M Cronin 0-2, M Kearney 0-2, M Kearney 0-1, J Kavanagh 0-1, M Daly 0-1, D Mehigan 0-1, C Corkery 0-1.

29 August 2004 Round 3	St. Nicholas'	0-09 - 0-14	Bantry Blues	Ballineen
	D Dorris 0-3, D Busteed 0-2, E Geaney 0-1, J Kearney 0-1, G Moylan 0-1, R Brosnan 0-1.		D O'Shea 0-3, P Clifford 0-3, D Barron 0-2, R Lynch 0-2, S McCarthy 0-1, G Canty 0-1, D O'Neill 0-1, J Canty 0-1.

=== Round 4 ===
4 July 2004 Round 4	Douglas	2-11 - 1-14	Duhallow	Coachford
	B Hanrahan 2-1, F O'Sullivan 0-5, J Lane 0-2, G McLoughlin 0-2, E Cadogan 0-1.		D O'Connor 0-8, R Casey 1-0, D O'Sullivan 0-3, T O'Keeffe 0-1, S O'Sullivan 0-1, N O'Sullivan 0-1.

18 July 2004 Round 4 replay	Douglas	1-09 - 2-09	Duhallow	Coachford
	F O'Sullivan 1-5, R McCarthy 0-2, B Hanrahan 0-1, B Fitzgerald 0-1.		R Casey 1-2, T O'Keeffe 1-1, D O'Connor 0-4, J Buckley 0-2.

31 July 2004 Round 4	Na Piarsaigh	0-11 - 0-13	Aghada	Carrigtwohill
	J Gardiner 0-4, S Óg Ó hAilpín 0-2, S Glasgow 0-2, C O'Sullivan 0-2.		E O'Neill 0-5, JP O'Connor 0-2, B Flaherty 0-2, T O'Keeffe 0-2, J O'Connell 0-1, P O'Neill 0-1.

2 August 2004 Round 4	O'Donovan Rossa	2-10 - 1-09	Dohenys	Castlehaven
	C McCarthy 0-7, R Long 1-0, D O'Keeffe 1-0, J Werner 0-2, S Crowley 0-1.		D Healy 1-1, S Farr 0-4, J Collins 0-1, M Farr 0-1, D O'Donovan 0-1, D Lyons 0-1.

8 August 2004 Round 4	Ilen Rovers	0-10 - 0-11	Bishopstown	Castle Grounds, Macroom
	K O'Sullivan 0-5, K Daly 0-2, D Whooley 0-1, P Connolly 0-1, E Sheehy 0-1.		J Ferriter 0-4, J Murphy 0-3, J O'Shea 0-2, B Cuthbert 0-1, J Honohan 0-1.

8 August 2004 Round 4	Castlehaven	1-10 - 2-09	Mallow	Castle Grounds, Macroom
	P Hurley 0-5, C Crowley 1-1, D Burns 0-1, D Hurley 0-1, B Collins 0-1, D Cahalane 0-1.		R Sheehan 1-2, D Lavin 1-1, C O'Riordan 0-3, A Aherne 0-2, J O'Sullivan 0-1.

8 August 2004 Round 4	Carbery	0-13 - 1-09	Cork Institute of Technology	Kilmurry
	K McMahon 0-3, M Moore 0-2, S Hayes 0-1, J Hayes 0-1, F Arundel 0-1, M Cronin 0-1, O Sexton 0-1, S Levis 0-1, S O'Brien 0-1, T Deasy 0-1.		B Sheehan 0-6, V Hurley 1-2, J White 0-1.

19 August 2004 Round 4	University College Cork	2-05 - 0-14	St. Finbarr's
	L Ó Lionáin 1-1, M O'Connor 1-0, P Madden 0-1, B Harty 0-1, K O'Keeffe 0-1, R Hussey 0-1.		F Murray 0-6, C McCarthy 0-4, R Curran 0-2, J O'Donoghue 0-1, R O'Mahony 0-1.

19 September 2004 Round 4	Clonakilty	0-10 - 0-08	Bantry Blues	Sam Maguire Park, Dunmanway
	P Griffin 0-4, C O'Donovan 0-2, B Walsh 0-2, C Callanan 0-1, C Murphy 0-1.		D Barron 0-3, P Clifford 0-2, D O'Shea 0-2, G Canty 0-1.

=== Quarter-finals ===
18 September 2004 Quarter-final	St. Finbarr's	0-14 - 0-11	Duhallow	Castle Grounds, Macroom
	F Murray 0-7, R O'Mahony 0-6, G Leahy 0-1.		D O'Connor 0-7, J Buckley 0-2, D O'Brien 0-1, D Herlihy 0-1.

18 September 2004 Quarter-final	Bishopstown	1-07 - 0-08	O'Donovan Rossa	Henry Ford Park, Ballinascarty
	J Ferriter 1-2, J O'Shea 0-2, A Buckley 0-1, R Honohan 0-1, J Murphy 0-1.		C McCarthy 0-4, S Crowley 0-2, N McCarthy 0-1, R Long 0-1.

18 September 2004 Quarter-final	Mallow	2-10 - 0-12	Aghada	Páirc Uí Rinn, Cork
	P Dineen 2-3, R Sheehan 0-4, D Golden 0-2, C O'Riordan 0-1.		E O'Neill 0-6, JP O'Connor 0-2, C O'Connor 0-1, P Kilbane 0-1, T O'Keeffe 0-1, B Morrissey 0-1.

25 September 2004 Quarter-final	Carbery	0-06 - 0-06	Clonakilty	Rossa Park, Skibbereen
	C Callanan 0-3, D Lyons 0-1, C O'Donovan 0-1, C Murphy 0-1.		J Hayes 0-3, F Arundel 0-1, T Deasy 0-1, M Moore 0-1.

3 October 2004 Quarter-final replay	Carbery	0-10 - 0-09	Clonakilty	Rossa Park, Skibbereen
	K McMahon 0-2, M Moore 0-2, J Hayes 0-2, F Arundel 0-2, A O'Connor 0-1, D Hayes 0-1.		C Murphy 0-4, H Kenny 0-2, S Nagle 0-1, C O'Donovan 0-1, C Callanan 0-1.

=== Semi-finals ===
3 October 2004 Semi-final	Bishopstown	0-15 - 0-13	St. Finbarr's	Páirc Uí Rinn, Cork
	J Ferriter 0-8, J O'Shea 0-3, J Honohan 0-2, R Honohan 0-1, J O'Sullivan 0-1.		R O'Mahony 0-5, F Murray 0-5, G Leahy 0-1, I Keeler 0-1, A Fitzpatrick 0-1.

10 October 2004 Semi-final	Carbery	1-10 - 0-11	Mallow	Castle Grounds, Macroom
	J Hayes 1-3, P Hegarty 0-2, S Levis 0-2, A O'Connor 0-1, F Arundel 0-1, M Cronin 0-1.		R Sheehan 0-5, C O'Riordan 0-4, A Ahern 0-1, T O'Riordan 0-1.

=== Final ===
17 October 2004 Final	Carbery	1-11 - 0-07	Bishopstown	Páirc Uí Chaoimh, Cork
	A O'Connor 1-0, P Hegarty 0-3, S Levis 0-2, J Hayes 0-2, M O'Sullivan, M Moore, D Hayes and F Arundel 0-1.	Report	J Ferriter 0-4 (4f), J O'Shea 0-2, S Conlisk 0-1.	Attendance: 7,349; Referee: N Barrett (Carrigtwohill)

== Championship statistics ==
=== Top scorers ===
Overall

Rank	Player	Club	Tally	Total	Matches	Average
1	Fionán Murray	St. Finbarr's	1-30	33	6	5.50
2	James O'Shea	Bishopstown	1-25	28	7	4.00
2	Jack Ferriter	Bishopstown	1-25	28	7	4.00
3	Donncha O'Connor	Duhallow	1-24	27	4	6.75
4	John Hayes	Carbery	1-19	22	7	3.14
5	Robert O'Mahony	St. Finbarr's	0-20	20	6	3.33

In a single game

Rank	Player	Club	Tally	Total	Opposition
1	Mícheál Ó Cróinín	Naomh Abán	2-08	14	Clonakilty
2	Kevin O'Sullivan	Ilen Rovers	0-11	11	Castlehaven
3	Alan Cronin	Nemo Rangers	2-03	9	Newcestown
3	Pa Dineen	Mallow	2-03	9	Aghada
4	James Masters	Nemo Rangers	2-02	8	Newcestown
4	Paul Condon	Seandún	2-02	8	Beara
4	Brendan Jer O'Sullivan	Beara	1-05	8	Seandún
4	Donncha O'Connor	Duhallow	1-05	8	Carrigdhoun
4	Fergal O'Sullivan	Douglas	1-05	8	Duhallow
4	James O'Shea	Bishopstown	0-08	8	Na Piarsaigh
4	Bryan Sheehan	CIT	0-08	8	Naomh Abán
4	Donncha O'Connor	Duhallow	0-08	8	Douglas
4	Jack Ferriter	Bishopstown	0-08	8	St. Finbarr's

=== Miscellaneous ===
- Carbery win their first time since 1971.
- Carbery are the first divisional team since Duhallow in 1991.
