= 2000 Cork Senior Football Championship =

Gaelic football competition

- Dates: 16 April 2000 – 1 October 2000
- Teams: 27
- Sponsor: TSB Bank
- Champions: Nemo Rangers (11th title); Larry Kavanagh (captain); Billy Morgan (manager)
- Runners-up: Carbery; Fachtna Collins (captain); Pat Sheehy (manager)

Tournament statistics
- Matches played: 43
- Goals scored: 55 (1.28 per match)
- Points scored: 902 (20.98 per match)
- Top scorer(s): Paul Holland (2-40)

The 2000 Cork Senior Football Championship was the 112th staging of the Cork Senior Football Championship since its establishment by the Cork County Board in 1887. The draw for the opening fixtures took place on 12 December 1999. The championship began on 16 April 2000 and ended on 1 October 2000.

University College Cork entered the championship as the defending champions, however, they were defeated by Castlehaven.

On 1 October 2000, Nemo Rangers won the championship following a 1-14 to 0-07 defeat of Carbery in the final. This was their 11th championship title overall and their first title since 1993.

Paul Holland from the Clyda Rovers club was the championship's top scorer with 2-40.

== Team changes ==
=== To Championship ===
Promoted from the Cork Intermediate Football Championship

- Naomh Abán

=== From Championship ===
Regraded to the Cork Intermediate Football Championship

- Glanmire

== Results ==
=== Preliminary round ===
16 April 2000 Preliminary round	O'Donovan Rossa	0-13 - 1-08	Douglas	Páirc Naomh Eoin, Newcestown
	J Werner 0-7, B Casey 0-3, D Davis 0-1, B O'Dobovan 0-1, C Keohane 0-1.		E Coveney 1-1, J Farrell 0-3, W Coveney 0-2, D Larkin 0-1, P Quirke 0-1.	Referee: N Barrett (Carrigtwohill)

=== First round ===
23 April 2000 Round 1	St Michael's	0-11 - 0-08	St. Nicholas'	Páirc Uí Rinn, Cork
	A Ryan 0-6, M Mulconroy 0-2, A Browne 0-1, D O'Connell 0-1, B O'Keeffe 0-1.		R Brosnan 0-2, N Byrne 0-2, M Brosnan 0-2, T Browne 0-1, K O'Callaghan 0-1.	Referee: D Linehan (Nemo Rangers)

23 April 2000 Round 1	Clonakilty	1-06 - 1-04	Na Piarsaigh	Charlie Hurley Park, Bandon
	K Meade 1-1, B Walsh 0-3, C O'Donovan 0-1, C Murphy 0-1.		G Casey 1-2, K O'Sullivan 0-1, G Daly 0-1.	Referee: G Harrington (Carrigaline)

23 April 2000 Round 1	Bantry Blues	1-10 - 1-10	Dohenys	Rossa Park, Skibbereen
	P Clifford 1-6, D O'Shea 0-2, P O'Rourke 0-1, J Canty 0-1.		D Nyhan 0-7, K Murray 1-1, P Collins 0-1, D O'Sullivan 0-1.	Referee: N Barrett (Carrigtwohill)

23 April 2000 Round 1	Bishopstown	0-18 - 0-15	Naomh Abán	Ovens
	J O'Shea 0-7, D Lynch 0-6, R Honohan 0-2, M Hayes 0-1, P O'Brien 0-1, J Honohan 0-1.		M Ó Cróinín 0-4, D Cronin 0-3, S Ó Cróinín 0-3, J Lynch 0-2, D Lynch 0-2, K Lucey 0-1.	Referee: N Brosnan (Killavullen)

23 April 2000 Round 1	St. Finbarr's	0-10 - 0-09	Aghada	Clonmult Memorial Park, Midleton
	F Murray 0-5, J O'Donoghue 0-2, N Horgan 0-2, M Ryan 0-1.		Mark Lewis 0-2, Michael Lewis 0-2, R Dwane 0-2, G Melvin 0-2, P O'Neill 0-1.	Referee: J Geaney (Kilshannig)

29 April 2000 Round 1 replay	Bantry Blues	0-10 - 0-07	Dohenys	Rossa Park, Skibbereen
	P Clifford 0-3, D O'Shea 0-2, E McCarthy 0-1, J Canty 0-1, P O'Rourke 0-1, D O'Neill 0-1, S Dineen 0-1.		D Nyhan 0-5, J Collins 0-1, K Murray 0-1.	Referee: J Harrington (Carrigaline)

29 April 2000 Round 1	Mallow	1-10 - 1-07	Clyda Rovers	O'Connell Park, Glantane
	R Sheehan 1-2, P Dineen 0-4, T O'Riordan 0-1, N Dinan 0-1, J Walsh 0-1, R Galvin 0-1.		P Holland 1-4, C O'Sullivan 0-1, D O'Brien 0-1, P O'Mullane 0-1.	Referee: N Barrett (Carrigtwohill)

30 April 2000 Round 1	Ballincollig	1-06 - 1-12	Douglas	Páirc Uí Rinn, Cork
	J O'Brien 1-1, E Bourke 0-2, JP O'Leary 0-1, J Miskella 0-1, P O'Donoghue 0-1.		E Coveney 0-6, C McCarthy 1-0, W Coveney 0-3, J Farrell 0-1, P McSweeney 0-1, P Barry 0-1.	Referee: M Collins (Clonakilty)

30 April 2000 Round 1	Nemo Rangers	1-17 - 2-08	Castlehaven	Charlie Hurley Park, Bandon
	C Corkery 0-11, W Morgan 1-1, A Cronin 0-2, D Kavanagh 0-1, J Kavanagh 0-1, Seán O'Brien 0-1.		P Hurley 1-3, B Deasy 1-0, C Crowley 0-3, B Collins 0-1, D Burns 0-1.	Referee: J Cummins (Glanworth)

=== Round 2 ===
21 May 2000 Round 2	Imokilly	0-10 - 1-08	Na Piarsaigh	Páirc Mac Gearailt, Fermoy
	D Barrett 0-4, S Landers 0-3, J Flavin 0-2, J O'Keeffe 0-1.		G Casey 1-1, S Glasgow 0-3, C O'Sullivan 0-1, S Óg Ó hAilpín 0-1, R Healy 0-1, C Fitzgerald 0-1.	Referee: J Cummins (Glanworth)

27 May 2000 Round 2	Avondhu	0-04 - 0-04	Naomh Abán	Dromtariffe
	J O'Mahony 0-3, T Twomey 0-1.		M Ó Cróinín 0-2, J Twomey 0-1, D Cronin 0-1.	Referee: D Ó Tuama (Millstreet)

28 May 2000 Round 2	Carbery	0-15 - 0-09	Dohenys	Castlehaven
	J O'Connell 0-4, D O'Donoghue 0-3, P Hegarty 0-2, F Arundel 0-1, J Cullinane 0-1, K Daly 0-1, T Deasy 0-1, B O'Sullivan 0-1, F Collins 0-1.		D Nyhan 0-5, J Collins 0-2, D O'Sullivan 0-1, M Farr 0-1.	Referee: G Harrington (Carrigaline)

2 June 2000 Round 2	University College Cork	0-08 - 0-12	Castlehaven	Clonakilty
	MD Cahill 0-2, I Twiss 0-2, P Murphy 0-2, C Galvin 0-1, E Hanrahan 0-1.		B Deasy 0-4, P Hurley 0-3, C Crowley 0-2, F Cahalane 0-1, B Collins 0-1, D Burns 0-1.	Referee: G Geaney (Kilshannig)

2 June 2000 Round 2	Seandún	1-06 - 0-15	Clyda Rovers	Carrignavar
	J Buckley 1-3, P O'Connell 0-1, C Kelleher 0-1, T Kiely 0-1.		P Holland 0-7, J Walsh 0-2, T McGlinchey 0-2, D O'Brien 0-1, C O'Sullivan 0-1, P O'Mullane 0-1, T O'Mullane 0-1.	Referee: G Sweeney (Glenville)

3 June 2000 Round 2	Carrigdhoun	2-10 - 1-11	St. Nicholas'	Ballinora
	M Prout 1-3, R O'Hanlon 1-0, D Fleming 0-3, M Doody 0-3, M Kelleher 0-1.		R Brosnan 1-2, M Brosnan 0-4, T Murphy 0-2, E O'Connor 0-1, K O'Callaghan 0-1, T Browne 0-1.	Referee: N Barrett (Carrigtwohill)

3 June 2000 Round 2	Beara	1-11 - 0-09	Aghada	St. Mary's Park, Ballineen
	P Murphy 1-1, S O'Regan 0-4, C O'Sullivan 0-2, BJ O'Sullivan 0-2, S Spencer 0-1, S Deane 0-1.		Michael Lewis 0-2, D Creedon 0-2, P Kilbane 0-1, Mark Lewis 0-1, G Melvin 0-1, C O'Brien 0-1, E O'Neill 0-1.	Referee: N Brosnan (Killavullen)

4 June 2000 Round 2	Duhallow	1-12 - 0-10	Ballincollig	Macroom
	Don O'Sullivan 1-3, J Buckley 0-3, M O'Sullivan 0-2, N O'Sullivan 0-1, J Herlihy 0-1, Der O'Sullivan 0-1, E O'Mahony 0-1.		M Green 0-5, S McIntyre 0-2, J Miskella 0-2, P O'Donoghue 0-1.	Referee: AJ Cronin (Mayfield)

30 June 2000 Round 2 replay	Avondhu	2-05 - 2-13	Naomh Abán	Dromtariffe
	J O'Callaghan 2-0, J O'Mahony 0-4, N Noonan 0-1.		K Lynch 1-4, D Lynch 1-1, M Ó Cróinín 0-4, SF Ó Cróinín 0-2, A Lynch 0-1, G Lynch 0-1.	Referee: D Twomey (Millstreet)

- The Cork Institute of Technology and Muskerry received byes in this round.

=== Round 3 ===
25 June 2000 Round 3	Cork Institute of Technology	0-10 - 2-11	Castlehaven	Páirc Naomh Eoin, Newcestown
	M Reidy 0-3, A O'Shea 0-3, T Cronin 0-3, A Constible 0-1.		C Crowley 1-4, P Hurley 1-3, B Deasy 0-1, B Collins 0-1, S Connolly 0-1, L O'Donovan 0-1,	Referee: D Lenihan (Nemo Rangers)

25 June 2000 Round 3	Clyda Rovers	0-12 - 0-12	Muskerry	Páirc Uí Rinn, Cork
	P Holland 0-8, T McGlinchey 0-2, K Cronin 0-1, D O'Brien 0-1.		M Kenny 0-3, S Coleman 0-2, A Doran 0-2, N Twomey 0-2, M Corkery 0-1, T Kenny 0-1, J O'Leary 0-1.	Referee: J Cummins (Glanworth)

15 July 2000 Round 3	Carrigdhoun	2-11 - 0-09	Na Piarsaigh	Páirc Uí Rinn, Cork
	D Fleming 2-3, M Doody 0-4, A Ashman 0-1, P Buckley 0-1, M Kelleher 0-1, E Newman 0-1.		C O'Sullivan 0-7, S Óg Ó hAilpín 0-1, C Fitzgerald 0-1.	Referee: G Sweeney (Glenville)

16 July 2000 Round 3 replay	Clyda Rovers	1-09 - 0-11	Muskerry	Páirc Uí Chaoimh, Cork
	P Holland 1-6, J Walsh 0-2, P O'Mullane 0-1.		A Dorgan 0-4, N Twomey 0-2, J O'Leary 0-1, G O'Halloran 0-1, G McPolin 0-1, S Coleman 0-1.	Referee: J Cummins (Glanworth)

=== Round 4 ===
22 July 2000 Round 4	St Michael's	1-10 - 2-08	St. Finbarr's	Páirc Uí Chaoimh, Cork
	K O'Connell 1-0, A Ryan 0-3, L Meaney 0-2, A Browne 0-2, B O'Keeffe 0-1, D O'Connell 0-1, M Mulconroy 0-1.		J O'Donoghue 1-2, N Horgan 1-1, R Curran 0-1, F O'Mahony 0-1, C McCarthy 0-1, F Murray 0-1, K Kelleher 0-1.	Referee: N Barrett (Carrigtwohill)

28 July 2000 Round 4	Clonakilty	0-12 - 0-09	Naomh Abán	Carrigadrohid
	K Meade 0-4, C O'Donovan 0-2, P Griffin 0-2, B Walsh 0-1, H Kenny 0-1, A Harte 0-1, E O'Mahony 0-1.		J Lynch 0-2, G Lynch 0-2, D Lynch 0-1, D Cronin 0-1, C Twomey 0-1, Seán Cronin 0-1, M Ó Cróinín 0-1.	Referee: N Barrett

29 July 2000 Round 4	Bishopstown	1-10 - 0-14	Douglas	Páirc Uí Chaoimh, Cork
	D O'Mahony 1-0, J O'Shea 0-3, D Brett 0-2, D Lynch 0-2, J Murphy 0-1, M Cogan 0-1, R Honohan 0-1.		R McCarthy 0-8, W Coveney 0-4, P Aherne 0-1, P Barry 0-1.	Referee: J Geaney (Kilshannig)

30 July 2000 Round 4	Castlehaven	1-08 - 1-08	O'Donovan Rossa	Sam Maguire Park, Dunmanway
	C Crowley 0-4, F Cahalane 1-0, P Hurley 0-2, D Burns 0-1, B Deasy 0-1.		C Keohane 1-0, J Werner 0-3, M Twomey 0-1, B Casey 0-1, D O'Sullivan 0-1, D Davis 0-1, B O'Donovan 0-1.	Referee: D Linehan (Nemo Rangers)

30 July 2000 Round 4	Duhallow	0-09 - 0-13	Clyda Rovers	Ballyclough
	D O'Sullivan 0-6, M O'Sullivan 0-1, J Buckley 0-1.		P Holland 0-7, C O'Sullivan 0-2, T McGlinchey 0-1, N Moloney 0-1, K Cronin 0-1, J Walsh 0-1.	Referee: M Collins (Clonakilty)

30 July 2000 Round 4	Carbery	0-13 - 0-12	Carrigdhoun	Páirc Uí Ríogáin, Ballinspittle
	P Connolly 0-4, B O'Sullivan 0-3, K Daly 0-3, F Collins 0-1, P Hegarty 0-1, D Hayes 0-1.		M Doody 0-4, D Fleming 0-3, M Kelleher 0-2, J Murphy 0-2, E Newman 0-1.	Referee: P Higgins (Ballincollig)

30 July 2000 Round 4	Nemo Rangers	2-10 - 1-13	Bantry Blues	Sam Maguire Park, Dunmanway
	C Corkery 0-7, J Kavanagh 1-1, Seán O'Brien 1-1, A Cronin 0-1.		P Clifford 1-4, J Canty 0-2, E Sheehan 0-2, S Dineen 0-2, P O'Rourke 0-1, D O'Neill 0-1, G Canty 0-1.	Referee: G Harrington (Carrigaline)

13 August 2000 Round 4	Mallow	0-10 - 0-13	Beara	Cill na Martra
	N Dinan 0-4, P Dineen 0-2, T O'Riordan 0-1, A Ahern 0-1, M O'Donovan 0-1, J Walsh 0-1.		C O'Sullivan 0-6, P Murphy 0-2, C O'Neill 0-2, S Spencer 0-1, T O'Shea 0-1, M Harrington 0-1.	Referee: R O'Sullivan (Kilmurry)

13 August 2000 Round 4 replay	Nemo Rangers	2-11 - 0-09	Bantry Blues	Sam Maguire Park, Dunmanway
	J Kavanagh 1-1, C Corkery 0-4, W Morgan 1-0, A Cronin 0-2, D Kavanagh 0-1, D Niblock 0-1, K Cahill 0-1, K Connolly 0-1.		P Clifford 0-5, D O'Neill 0-2, S McCarthy 0-1, S Dineen 0-1.	Referee: G Harrington (Carrigaline)

13 August 2000 Round 4 replay	Castlehaven	1-09 - 1-13	O'Donovan Rossa	Sam Maguire Park, Dunmanway
	C Crowley 1-5, B Deasy 0-4.		J Werner 0-7, K O'Dwyer 1-0, C Keohane 0-2, B Casey 0-2, N McCarthy 0-1, J O'Driscoll 0-1.	Referee: D Linehan (Nemo Rangers)

=== Quarter-finals ===
12 August 2000 Quarter-final	Clyda Rovers	0-12 - 0-11	Douglas	Blarney Sportsfield, Blarney
	P Holland 0-5, P O'Mullane 0-2, T McGlinchey 0-1, C O'Sullivan 0-1, N O'Mullane 0-1, J Walsh 0-1.		W Coveney 0-4, R McCarthy 0-3, P McSweeney 0-3, C Dineen 0-1.	Referee: N Barrett (Carrigtwohill)

20 August 2000 Quarter-final	Nemo Rangers	1-10 - 0-08	St. Finbarr's	Páirc Uí Chaoimh, Cork
	C Corkery 0-5, W Morgan 1-0, J Kavanagh 0-3, A Cronin 0-2.		F Murray 0-7, K Kelleher 0-1.	Referee: J Geaney (Kilshannig)

26 August 2000 Quarter-final	Carbery	2-10 - 1-13	Clonakilty	Henry Ford Park, Ballinascarthy
	J O'Connell 1-1, S Levis 1-0, B O'Sullivan 0-3, K Daly 0-2, E Sexton 0-1, F Collins 0-1, J Whooley 0-1, P Hegarty 0-1.		C O'Donovan 0-6, B Walsh 1-2, P Griffin 0-3, H Kenny 0-1, D Cahill 0-1.	Referee: D Linehan (Nemo Rangers)

27 August 2000 Quarter-final	O'Donovan Rossa	0-17 - 1-14	Beara	Wolfe Tone Park, Bantry
	J Werner 0-6, B Casey 0-3, C Keohane 0-3, D O'Sullivan 0-2, C McCarthy 0-1, D Davis 0-1, J O'Driscoll 0-1.		C O'Sullivan 0-6, S Deane 1-1, M Harrington 0-2, C O'Neill 0-2, P Connolly 0-2, O O'Sullivan 0-1.

3 September 2000 Quarter-final replay	O'Donovan Rossa	2-12 - 1-06	Beara	Wolfe Tone Park, Bantry
	J Werner 1-7, C Keohane 1-2, D Davis 0-2, J O'Driscoll 0-1.		C O'Sullivan 0-4, P Murphy 1-0, O O'Sullivan 0-1, P Connolly 0-1.	Referee: R O'Sullivan

3 September 2000 Quarter-final replay	Carbery	1-12 - 0-10	Clonakilty	Henry Ford Park, Ballinascarthy
	B O'Sullivan 0-6, J Cullinane 1-1, K Daly 0-2, P Hegarty 0-1, A Quinn 0-1, J Whooley 0-1.		B Walsh 0-6, M Harrington 0-2, P Griffin 0-1, T O'Sullivan 0-1.	Referee: D Linehan (Nemo Rangers)

=== Semi-finals ===
3 September 2000 Semi-final	Nemo Rangers	3-09 - 0-08	Clyda Rovers	Carrowkeel Pitch, Mallow
	S O'Brien 1-0, D Niblock 1-0, W Morgan 1-0, C Corkery 0-3, J Kavanagh 0-2, A Cronin 0-2, M Cronin 0-1, K Cahill 0-1.		C O'Sullivan 0-3, P Holland 0-3, D O'Brien 0-1, N O'Mullane 0-1.	Referee: N Barrett

9 September 2000 Semi-final	Carbery	0-09 - 1-06	O'Donovan Rossa	Clonakilty
	B O'Sullivan 0-5, K Daly 0-2, M O'Sullivan 0-1, F Collins 0-1.		J Werner 0-5, B Casey 1-1.	Referee: J Geaney (Kilsahnnig)

9 September 2000 Semi-final replay	Carbery	0-09 - 0-05	O'Donovan Rossa	Clonakilty
	F Collins 0-2, B O'Sullivan 0-2, J O'Connell 0-2, J Sheehy 0-1, E Sexton 0-1, S Levis 0-1.		J Werner 0-2, C Keohane 0-1, J O'Driscoll 0-1, B O'Donovan 0-1.	Referee: J Geaney (Kilsahnnig)

=== Final ===
1 October 2000 Final	Nemo Rangers	1-14 - 0-07	Carbery	Páirc Uí Chaoimh, Cork
	A Cronin 1-4, C Corkery 0-5, J Kavanagh 0-2, N Geary 0-1, D Niblock 0-1, M Cronin 0-1.		K Daly 0-2, E Sexton 0-1, J O'Sullivan 0-1, B O'Sullivan 0-1, P Connolly 0-1, F Collins 0-1.	Referee: J Geaney (Kilshannig)

== Championship statistics ==
=== Top scorers ===
Top scorers overall

Rank	Player	Club	Tally	Total	Matches	Average
1	Paul Holland	Clyda Rovers	2-40	46	7	6.57
2	Jurgen Werner	O'Donovan Rossa	1-37	40	7	5.71
3	Colin Corkery	Nemo Rangers	0-35	35	6	5.83
4	Philip Clifford	Bantry Blues	2-18	24	4	6.00
4	Colin Crowley	Castlehaven	2-18	24	5	5.80
6	Brian O'Sullivan	Carbery	0-21	21	7	3.00
7	Paudie Hurley	Castlehaven	2-11	17	5	3.40
7	David Nyhan	Dohenys	0-17	17	3	5.66
9	Joe Kavanagh	Nemo Rangers	2-10	16	6	2.66
9	Alan Cronin	Nemo Rangers	1-13	16	6	2.66

Top scorers in a single game

Rank	Player	Club	Tally	Total	Opposition
1	Colin Corkery	Nemo Rangers	0-11	11	Castlehaven
2	Jurgen Werner	O'Donovan Rossa	1-07	10	Beara
3	David Fleming	Carrigdhoun	2-03	9	Na Piarsaigh
3	Philip Clifford	Bantry Blues	1-06	9	Dohenys
3	Paul Holland	Clyda Rovers	1-06	9	Muskerry
6	Colin Crowley	Castlehaven	1-05	8	O'Donovan Rossa
6	Ronan McCarthy	Douglas	0-08	8	Bishopstown
6	Paul Holland	Clyda Rovers	0-08	8	Muskerry
9	Paul Holland	Clyda Rovers	1-04	7	Mallow
9	Kevin Lynch	Naomh Abán	1-04	7	Avondhu
9	Colin Crowley	Castlehaven	1-04	7	CIT
9	Philip Clifford	Bantry Blues	1-04	7	Nemo Rangers
9	Alan Cronin	Nemo Rangers	1-04	7	Carbery
9	Jurgen Werner	O'Donovan Rossa	0-07	7	Douglas
9	David Nyhan	Dohenys	0-07	7	Bantry Blues
9	James O'Shea	Bishopstown	0-07	7	Naomh Abán
9	Paul Holland	Clyda Rovers	0-07	7	Seandún
9	Colin O'Sullivan	Na Piarsaigh	0-07	7	Carrigdhoun
9	Paul Holland	Clyda Rovers	0-07	7	Duhallow
9	Colin Corkery	Nemo Rangers	0-07	7	Bantry Blues
9	Jurgen Werner	O'Donovan Rossa	0-07	7	Castlehaven
9	Fionán Murray	St. Finbarr's	0-07	7	Nemo Rangers

=== Miscellaneous ===
- Carrigdhoun recorded back-to-back victories for the first time in the history of the championship.
- As a result of their victory in the final, Nemo Rangers joined the defunct Lees club at the top of the all-time roll of honour with 11 titles.
- Carbery qualify for the final for the first time since 1974.
