= 2013 Cork Premier Intermediate Football Championship =

- Dates: 5 May 2013 – 13 October 2013
- Teams: 16
- Sponsor: Evening Echo
- Champions: Clyda Rovers (1st title); Oliver O'Hanlon (captain); John Walsh (manager)
- Runners-up: Macroom
- Relegated: Kinsale

Tournament statistics
- Matches played: 29
- Goals scored: 47 (1.62 per match)
- Points scored: 597 (20.59 per match)
- Top scorer(s): Conor Horgan (1-21); Gearóid Finn (0-24)

The 2013 Cork Premier Intermediate Football Championship was the eighth staging of the Cork Premier Intermediate Football Championship since its establishment by the Cork County Board in 2006. The draw for the opening round fixtures took place on 9 December 2012. The championship began on 5 May 2013 and ended on 13 October 2013.

St. Vincent's and Mayfield left the championship after their respective promotion and relegation to different grades. Castletownbere and Na Piarsaigh joined the championship. Kinsale were relegated from the championship after being beaten in a playoff by Carrigaline.

The final was played on 13 October 2013 at Páirc Uí Chaoimh in Cork, between Clyda Rovers, who were appearing in their fourth final in five seasons, and Macroom. Clyda Rovers won the match by 0–13 to 0–08 to claim their first championship title in the grade and a first title in any grade since 1996.

Conor Horgan and Gearóid Finn were the championship's top scorers.

== Team changes ==
=== To Championship ===
Promoted from the Cork Intermediate Football Championship

- Castletownbere

Relegated from the Cork Senior Football Championship

- Na Piarsaigh

=== From Championship ===
Promoted to the Cork Senior Football Championship

- St. Vincent's

Relegated to the Cork Intermediate Football Championship

- Mayfield

== Results ==
=== Round 1 ===
| 5 May 2013 Round 1 | Ballinora | 1-11 - 1-10 | Kinsale | Belgooly |
| | M Murphy 1-4, P Fitton 0-3, D O'Neill 0-2, A O'Neill 0-1, G O'Halloran 0-1. | | G Finn 0-7, C O'Brien 1-1, L Kiely 0-1, C Quigley 0-1. |

| 5 May 2013 Round 1 | Castletownbere | 0-03 - 1-09 | Clyda Rovers | Kilmichael |
| | D Murphy 0-2, D Fenton 0-1. | | P Kissane 1-4, C O'Sullivan 0-1, F O'Shea 0-1, D Roche 0-1, C Flanagan 0-1, G Carey 0-1. |

| 5 May 2013 Round 1 | Macroom | 0-11 - 2-16 | St. Michael's | Cloughduv |
| | P Lucey 0-4, T Dineen 0-3, F Goold 0-2, C Murphy 0-1, D Goold 0-1. | | E Hegarty 1-4, P Cronin 0-5, M Ryan 1-1, E Buckley 0-3, W Kennedy 0-2, M Mulconry 0-1. |

| 5 May 2013 Round 1 | Naomh Abán | 3-13 - 2-11 | Glenville | Ballincollig |
| | M Ó Cróinín 2-5, M Ó Duinnín 1-2, S Mac Cárthaigh 0-4, S Ó Laoire 0-1, D Ó Ceotháin 0-1. | | K O'Neill 2-0, P Cahill 0-5, A Cronin 0-2, W Connolly 0-2, K Coakley 0-1, E O'Reilly 0-1. |

| 5 May 2013 Round 1 | Valley Rovers | 0-12 - 0-09 | Bantry Blues | St. Mary's Park |
| | H O'Donovan 0-7, C O'Donovan 0-2, J Lyons 0-1, D Crowley 0-1, D Lynch 0-1. | | D Barron 0-4, D Casey 0-1, R Deane 0-1, M Delaney 0-1, K Harrington 0-1, M O'Sullivan 0-1. |

| 5 May 2013 Round 1 | Mallow | 3-09 - 2-10 | Nemo Rangers | Blarney |
| | J Loughrey 1-3, D Relihan 1-1, R Harkin 1-0, C O'Riordan 0-2, K O'Connor 0-2, P Herlihy 0-1. | | C Horgan 0-6, A O'Donovan 1-1, C Allen 1-0, B Twomey 0-1, D Kearney 0-1, S Martin 0-1. |

| 10 May 2013 Round 1 | Béal Átha'n Ghaorthaidh | 0-12 - 1-06 | Carrigaline | Coachford |
| | A Ó Coinceannáin 0-6, L Seartan 0-3, T Ó Laoire 0-1, N Ó Duinnín 0-1, P Ó Buachalla 0-1. | | P Murphy 1-1, S O'Brien 0-2, D Drake 0-2, N Coakley 0-1. |

| 12 May 2013 Round 1 | Na Piarsaigh | 2-17 - 2-10 (aet) | Kiskeam | Doneraile |
| | S Glasgow 1-4, J Gardiner 0-7, C O'Mahony 1-2, A Hogan 0-3, P Gould 0-1. | | B Dennehy 1-6, N Cronin 1-1, M Herlihy 0-1, G Casey 0-1, AJ Cronin 0-1. |

=== Round 2 ===
| 22 June 2013 Round 2 | Bantry Blues | 0-17 - 0-09 | Kinsale | Cloughduv |
| | D Barron 0-7, N O'Sullivan 0-6, T Downey 0-2, G O'Shea 0-1, S O'Leary 0-1. | | G Finn 0-7, C O'Brien 0-1, M Cronin 0-1. |

| 22 June 2013 Round 2 | Carrigaline | 1-08 - 2-09 | Kiskeam | MAllow GAA Complex |
| | D Twomey 1-0, K McIntyre 0-3, B O'Keeffe 0-2, N Coakley 0-2, W O'Brien 0-1. | | E Casey 1-2, D Scannell 1-1, B Dennehy 0-3, M Herlihy 0-2, N Cronin 0-1. |

| 22 June 2013 Round 2 | Glenville | 1-03 - 3-13 | Macroom | Ballincollig |
| | M Barry 1-0, P O'Regan 0-1, B Moloney 0-1, W Connolly 0-1. | | D Goold 3-1, F Goold 0-3, P Lucey 0-3, D Horgan 0-2, S Kiely 0-1, B O'Donnell 0-1, M O'Donnell 0-1, I Casey 0-1. |

| 23 June 2013 Round 2 | Castletownbere | 1-10 - 0-09 | Nemo Rangers | Ballingeary |
| | D Murphy 0-5, J Murphy 1-0, A O'Regan 0-2, A O'Sullivan 0-2, D Fenton 0-1. | | J Horgan 0-2, C Allen 0-2, C Horgan 0-2, K Weldon 0-2, P Brophy 0-1. |

=== Round 3 ===
| 13 July 2013 Round 3 | Kinsale | 0-11 - 3-07 | Nemo Rangers | Riverstick |
| | G Finn 0-6, M Cronin 0-2, R O'Sullivan 0-1, L Kiely 0-1, C O'Brien 0-1. | | C Horgan 1-4, D Kearney 1-1, C Allen 1-1, J Horgan 0-1. |

| 13 July 2013 Round 3 | Glenville | 0-11 - 0-09 | Carrigaline | Páirc Uí Rinn |
| | P Cahill 0-8, W Connolly 0-1, E Barry 0-1, B Healy 0-1. | | K McIntyre 0-3, B O'Keeffe 0-2, W O'Brien 0-2, N Coakley 0-1, N Murphy 0-1. |

=== Relegation playoff ===
| 14 September 2013 Playoff | Carrigaline | 3-15 - 0-07 | Kinsale | Brinny Sportsfield |
| | N Coakley 2-5, W O'Brien 1-0, D Drake 0-3, J Moran 0-2, P Murphy 0-1, C McIntyre 0-1, B O'Keeffe 0-1, S O'Brien 0-1, B Coakley 0-1. | | G Finn 0-4, A Gould 0-1, C O'Brien 0-1, L Kiely 0-1. |

=== Round 4 ===
| 27 July 2013 Round 4 | Ballinora | 0-09 - 1-14 | Nemo Rangers | Páirc Uí Rinn |
| | B Ahern 0-4, C Brosnan 0-2, M Murphy 0-2, T McGrath 0-1. | | C Allen 1-1, M Dorgan 0-4, C Horgan 0-4, J Horgan 0-1, M Kearney 0-1, D Niblock 0-1, D Kearney 0-1, K Weldon 0-1. |

| 4 August 2013 Round 4 | Naomh Abán | 0-16 - 0-21 | Kiskeam | Dromtarriffe |
| | S Mac Cárthaigh 0-6, M Ó Cróinín 0-5, D Ó Liatháin 0-2, M Ó Duinnín 0-1, S Ó Laoire 0-1, D Ó Cróinín 0-1. | | D Scannell 0-5, M Herlihy 0-4, B Dennehy 0-3, N Cronin 0-3, D Fitzgerald 0-2, R Carroll 0-1, M Casey 0-1, A O'Connor 0-1, T O'Sullivan 0-1. |

| 10 August 2013 Round 4 | Na PIarsaigh | 1-09 - 2-08 | Glenville | Erin's Own Grounds |
| | J Gardiner 1-1, A Brady 0-2, C O'Mahony 0-2, C Lynch 0-1, A Hogan 0-1, P Rourke 0-1, S Glasgow 0-1. | | E O'Reilly 2-0, N O'Riordan 0-3, W Connolly 0-2, B Healy 0-2, B Maloney 0-1. |

| 16 August 2013 Round 4 | Bantry Blues | 0-07 - 0-08 | Clyda Rovers | Kilmichael |
| | D Barron 0-2, M O'Sullivan 0-2, S O'Leary 0-1, G O'Shea 0-1, R Deane 0-1. | | C O'Sullivan 0-3, R Flanagan 0-2, P O'Mullane 0-1, F O'Shea 0-1, J Murphy 0-1. |

| 17 August 2013 Round 4 | St. Michael's | 0-12 - 2-08 | Valley Rovers | Carrigaline |
| | E Hegarty 0-5, P Cronin 0-4, M Mulconry 0-1, M Ryan 0-1, E Buckley 0-1. | | J Cottrell 1-2, F Lynch 1-1, E Fallon 0-2, H O'Donovan 0-2, D Murphy 0-1. |

| 25 August 2013 Round 4 | Béal Átha'n Ghaorthaidh | 3-11 - 2-08 | Mallow | Carrigadrohid |
| | L Seartan 1-4, P Ó Buachalla 1-1, C Ó Duinnín 1-1, B Seartan 0-2, C Ó Tuama 0-1, L Ó Coinceannáin 0-1, T Ó Laoire 0-1. | | E Stanton 1-0, L Attridge 1-0, C O'Riordan 0-3, L Dockery 0-1, H Dockery 0-1, K O'Connor 0-1, P Herlihy 0-1, D Relihan 0-1. |

=== Quarter-finals ===
| 17 August 2013 Quarter-final | Castletownbere | 0-05 - 0-12 | Macroom | Sam Maguire Park |
| | D Murphy 0-2, A O'Sullivan 0-2, D Fenton 0-1. | | P Lucey 0-4, F Goold 0-3, I Casey 0-2, S Kiely 0-1, G Angland 0-1, T Dineen 0-1. |

| 25 August 2013 Quarter-final | Clyda Rovers | 0-16 - 0-10 | Glenville | Mayfield |
| | J Murphy 0-7, Cian O'Sullivan 0-4, Conor O'Sullivan 0-2, P Kissane 0-2, C Flanagan 0-1. | | P Cahill 0-6, W Connolly 0-2, J Halbert 0-2. |

| 1 September 2013 Quarter-final | Kiskeam | 1-07 - 1-14 | Valley Rovers | Coachford |
| | B Dennehy 1-2, R Carroll 0-3, M Herlihy 0-1, D Scannell 0-1. | | D Murphy 1-2, J Cottrell 0-3, H O'Donovan 0-2, F Lynch 0-2, J Lyons 0-2, T Cummins 0-1, K Canty 0-1, E Delaney 0-1. |

| 14 September 2013 Quarter-final | Béal Átha'n Ghaorthaidh | 0-09 - 0-10 | Nemo Rangers | Kilmurry |
| | L Seartan 0-5, C Ó Tuama 0-2, B Ó Coinceannáin 0-1, B Seartan 0-1. | | M Dorgan 0-3, C Horgan 0-3, J Horgan 0-2, D Kearney 0-1, E Dilloughrey 0-1. |

=== Semi-finals ===
| 15 September 2013 Semi-final | Macroom | 0-13 - 0-13 | Valley Rovers | Páirc Uí Rinn |
| | P Lucey 0-4, D Goold 0-3, F Goold 0-2, S Kiely 0-1, C Murphy 0-1, I Casey 0-1, D Horgan 0-1. | | J Cottrell 0-5, D Murphy 0-2, H O'Donovan 0-2, K Canty 0-1, J Lyons 0-1, J Murphy 0-1, E Fallon 0-1. |

| 21 September 2013 Semi-final replay | Macroom | 0-10 - 0-06 | Valley Rovers | Páirc Uí Rinn |
| | P Lucey 0-4, F Goold 0-2, D Goold 0-2, D Horgan 0-1, P Corrigan 0-1. | | H O'Donovan 0-3, J Cottrell 0-1, D Crowley 0-1, K Canty 0-1. |

| 27 September 2013 Semi-final | Clyda Rovers | 0-09 - 0-04 | Nemo Rangers | Cloughduv |
| | J Murphy 0-4, Conor O'Sullivan 0-2, O O'Hanlon 0-1, C Flanagan 0-1, P O'Mullane 0-1. | | C Horgan 0-2, J Horgan 0-1, E Dilloughrey 0-1. |

=== Final ===
| 13 October 2013 Final | Clyda Rovers | 0-13 - 0-08 | Macroom | Páirc Uí Chaoimh |
| | C Flanagan (1f), J Murphy (2f), K Fitzgerald 0-3 each, P O’Mullane 0-2, P Kissane, Cian O’Sullivan 0-1 each. | | F Goold 0-3 (1f), C Murphy, S Kiely, P Lucey (f), D Goold, Casey 0-1 each. | Referee: J Bermingham (Bride Rovers) |

== Championship statistics ==
=== Top scorers ===
Overall

| Rank | Player | Club | Tally | Total | Matches | Average |
|---|---|---|---|---|---|---|
| 1 | Conor Horgan | Nemo Rangers | 1-21 | 24 | 6 | 4.00 |
| 1 | Gearóid Finn | Kinsale | 0-24 | 24 | 4 | 6.00 |
| 2 | Billy Dennehy | Kiskeam | 2-14 | 20 | 4 | 5.00 |
| 2 | Patrick Lucey | Macroom | 0-20 | 20 | 6 | 3.66 |
| 3 | Paudie Cahill | Glenville | 0-19 | 19 | 4 | 4.75 |
| 4 | David Goold | Macroom | 3-08 | 17 | 6 | 2.83 |
| 5 | Mícheál Ó Cróinín | Naomh Abán | 2-10 | 16 | 2 | 8.00 |
| 5 | Hughie O'Donovan | Valley Rovers | 0-16 | 16 | 5 | 3.20 |
| 6 | Niall Coakley | Carrigaline | 2-09 | 15 | 4 | 3.75 |
| 6 | Liam Seartan | Béal Átha'n Ghaorthaidh | 1-12 | 15 | 3 | 5.00 |
| 6 | James Murphy | Clyda Rovers | 0-15 | 15 | 5 | 3.00 |
| 6 | Fintan Goold | Macroom | 0-15 | 15 | 6 | 2.50 |

In a single game

| Rank | Player | Club | Tally | Total | Opposition |
|---|---|---|---|---|---|
| 1 | Mícheál Ó Cróinín | Naomh Abán | 2-05 | 11 | Glenville |
| 1 | Niall Coakley | Carrigaline | 2-05 | 11 | Kinsale |
| 2 | David Goold | Macroom | 3-01 | 10 | Glenville |
| 3 | Billy Dennehy | Kiskeam | 1-06 | 9 | Na Piarsaigh |
| 4 | Paudie Cahill | Glenville | 0-08 | 8 | Carrigaline |
| 5 | Michael Murphy | Ballinora | 1-04 | 7 | Kinsale |
| 5 | Paudie Kissane | Clyda Rovers | 1-04 | 7 | Castletownbere |
| 5 | Eric Hegarty | St. Michael's | 1-04 | 7 | Macroom |
| 5 | Stephen Glasgow | Na Piarsaigh | 1-04 | 7 | Kiskeam |
| 5 | Conor Horgan | Nemo Rangers | 1-04 | 7 | Kinsale |
| 5 | Liam Seartan | Béal Átha'n Ghaorthaidh | 1-04 | 7 | Mallow |
| 5 | Gearóid Finn | Kinsale | 0-07 | 7 | Ballinora |
| 5 | Hughie O'Donovan | Valley Rovers | 0-07 | 7 | Bantry Blues |
| 5 | John Gardiner | Na Piarsaigh | 0-07 | 7 | Kiskeam |
| 5 | Declan Barron | Bantry Blues | 0-07 | 7 | Kinsale |
| 5 | Gearóid Finn | Kinsale | 0-07 | 7 | Bantry Blues |
| 5 | James Murphy | Clyda Rovers | 0-07 | 7 | Glenville |
