= 2001 Cork Senior Football Championship =

Gaelic football competition

- Dates: 14 April 2001 – 30 September 2001
- Teams: 28
- Sponsor: TSB Bank
- Champions: Nemo Rangers (12th title); Colin Corkery (captain); Billy Morgan (manager)
- Runners-up: Bantry Blues; Niall Twomey (captain); Paddy Minihane (manager)

Tournament statistics
- Matches played: 39
- Goals scored: 56 (1.44 per match)
- Points scored: 823 (21.1 per match)
- Top scorer(s): Philip Clifford (7-13)

The 2001 Cork Senior Football Championship was the 113th staging of the Cork Senior Football Championship since its establishment by the Cork County Board in 1887. The draw for the opening fixtures took place on 10 December 2000. The championship began on 14 April 2001 and ended on 30 September 2001.

Nemo Rangers entered the championship as the defending champions.

On 30 September 2001, Nemo Rangers won the championship following a 1-14 to 0-06 defeat of Bantry Blues in the final. This was their 12th championship title overall and their second title in succession.

== Team changes ==
=== To Championship ===
Promoted from the Cork Intermediate Football Championship

- Youghal

== Results ==
=== First round ===
14 April 2001 First round	Douglas	0-09 - 1-18	St. Finbarr's	Páirc Uí Rinn
	W Coveney 0-3, P McSweeney 0-2, E Coveney 0-1, G McLaughlin 0-1, J Farrell 0-1, P Quirke 0-1.		F Murray 0-6, B Moore 1-1, B Duffy 0-4, C McCarthy 0-2, J Donoghue 0-2, K Kelleher 0-1, R McCarthy 0-1, F O'Mahony 0-1.

14 April 2001 First round	Aghada	0-12 - 2-10	Bantry Blues	Ovens
	M Lewis 0-8, D Creedon 0-2, T O'Keeffe 0-1.		P Clifford 2-3, S McCarthy 0-4, D O'Shea 0-1, P O'Rourke 0-1, D O'Neill 0-1.

14 April 2001 First round	St. Nicholas'	0-08 - 0-11	Ballincollig	Páirc Uí Chaoimh, Cork
	R Brosnan 0-3, N Byrnes 0-1, J Anderson 0-1, K O'Callaghan 0-1, T Halloran 0-1, P O'Brien 0-1.		M Greene 0-4, F Keohane 0-2, J Miskella 0-2, J O'Brien 0-1, D Bourke 0-1, L O'Toole 0-1.

14 April 2001 First round	Naomh Abán	0-11 - 1-10	Castlehaven	Sam Maguire Park, Dunmanway
	M Ó Cróinín 0-6, Donncha Ó Cróinín 0-1, Donal Ó Cróinín 0-1, J Ó Tuama 0-1, S Ó Loingsigh 0-1, A Ó Loingsigh 0-1.		C Crowley 1-1, B Deasy 0-4, P Hurley 0-4, M Burns 0-1.

14 April 2001 First round	Na Piarsaigh	1-09 - 0-09	Youghal	Páirc Uí Chonaill, Youghal
	JP Murphy 0-6, Setanta Ó hAilpín 1-1, K Butterworth 0-1, S O'Sullivan 0-1.		J Flynn 0-4, A Healy 0-3, B Mackey 0-1, E Coleman 0-1.

20 April 2001 First round	St Michael's	0-04 - 1-16	Dohenys	Charlie Hurley Park, Bandon
	M Mulconry 0-1, K O'Connell 0-1, L Meaney 0-1, A Ryan 0-1.		D Nyhan 1-5, C Crowley 0-3, P Collins 0-2, K Murray 0-2, J Collins 0-2, S Collins 0-2.

21 April 2001 First round	Bishopstown	1-10 - 2-09	Clyda Rovers	Páirc Uí Rinn, Cork
	J O'Shea 0-6, M Cogan 1-0, J Murphy 0-2, L Honohan 0-1, J Honohan 0-1.		P Holland 0-6, J Walsh 1-0, P Kissane 1-0, C O'Sullivan 0-2, N O'Mullane 0-1.

25 April 2001 First round	Mallow	0-10 - 2-06	O'Donovan Rossa	Ovens
	R Sheehan 0-5, D Golden 0-1, T O'Riordan 0-1, J O'Sullivan 0-1, R Galvin 0-1, M Buckley 0-1.		C McCarthy 1-2, C Keohane 1-0, D O'Sullivan 0-2, D Davis 0-1, J Werner 0-1.

6 May 2001 First round	Clonakilty	0-05 - 2-14	Nemo Rangers	Charlie Hurley Park, Bandon
	B Walsh 0-2, C O'Donovan 0-2, G O'Callaghan 0-1.		W Morgan 2-3, C Corkery 0-3, J Kavanagh 0-2, JP O'Neill 0-2, A Morgan 0-2, Seán O'Brien 0-1, K Cahill 0-1.	Referee: N Barrett (Carrigtwohill)

=== Second round ===
5 May 2001 Second round	University College Cork	2-08 - 0-09	Beara	Rossa Park, Skibbereen
	B Sheehan 0-5, S O'Mahony 1-1, K O'Keeffe 1-0, M Ó Sé 0-1, D Reidy 0-1.		BJ O'Sullivan 0-3, C O'Sullivan 0-2, S Harrington 0-2, A O'Regan 0-1, S O'Regan 0-1.

19 May 2001 Second round	Carrigdhoun	0-12 - 0-12	Naomh Abán	Kilmurry
	E Collins 0-3, K Ashman 0-2, S Collins 0-2, D Fleming 0-1, O Conlon 0-1, M Kelleher 0-1, M Prout 0-1, V Hurley 0-1.		M Ó Cróinín 0-8, D Ó Súilleabháin 0-1, G Óg Ó Loingsigh 0-1, D Ó Loingsigh 0-1.

19 May 2001 Second round	Youghal	0-13 - 0-09	Aghada	Ballymacoda
	P Moylan 0-6, E Coleman 0-2, M Ó Laocha 0-2, P Coleman 0-1, P O'Driscoll 0-1, B Mackey 0-1.		M Lewis 0-5, T O'Keeffe 0-2, K O'Connor 0-1, G Hurley 0-1.

19 May 2001 Second round	Duhallow	0-11 - 0-10	Mallow	Ballyclough
	D O'Connor 0-3, M O'Sullivan 0-2, J Carroll 0-1, A O'Sullivan 0-1, DC O'Connor 0-1, R Casey 0-1, D O'Sullivan 0-1, S Walsh 0-1.		R Sheehan 0-5, M O'Donovan 0-2, J O'Sullivan 0-1, R Galvin 0-1, A Ahern 0-1.

20 May 2001 Second round	Seandún	0-10 - 0-08	Clonakilty	Newcestown
	K O'Brien 0-4, JP Murphy 0-3, J Buckley 0-1, P O'Connell 0-1, D O'Connor 0-1.		C O'Donovan 0-3, C Murphy 0-2, B Walsh 0-1, N Hayes 0-1, B Murphy 0-1.

26 May 2001 Second round replay	Carrigdhoun	0-06 - 0-12	Naomh Abán	Kilmurry
	E Collins 0-3, N Murphy 0-1, O Conlon 0-1, J Burke 0-1.		M Ó Cróinín 0-5, G Óg Ó Loingsigh 0-2, D Ó Súilleabháin 0-2, K Ó Loingsigh 0-1, A Ó Loingsigh 0-1, P Ó Duinnín 0-1.

6 June 2001 Second round	Carbery	1-12 - 0-13	Cork Institute of Technology	Kinsale
	P Connolly 0-4, S Levis 1-0, O Sexton 0-2, K O'Sullivan 0-2, P Hegarty 0-2, P Nolan 0-1, F Collins 0-1.		M Reidy 0-7, G Walsh 0-1, S O'Sullivan 0-1, B Hickey 0-1, D O'Brien 0-1, DJ Fleming 0-1, B O'Connell 0-1.

8 June 2001 Second round	Avondhu	1-12 - 0-11	St. Nicholas'	Glenville
	E Pierce 1-4, G Kelleher 0-3, J O'Callaghan 0-3, B O'Driscoll 0-1, N Noonan 0-1.		R Brosnan 0-7, S Coughlan 0-3, P O'Brien 0-1, T O'Halloran 0-1.

9 June 2001 Second round	Muskerry	0-10 - 0-13	St Michael's	Innishannon
	A Dorgan 0-3, D Kelleher 0-3, M Twohig 0-1, A O'Shea 0-1, T Kenny 0-1, J Russell 0-1.		D O'Connell 0-3, A Browne 0-3, A Ryan 0-2, W Sherlock 0-1, A Meaney 0-1, M Mulconroy 0-1, B O'Keeffe 0-1, D Gosnell 0-1.

23 June 2001 Second round	Bishopstown	0-11 - 1-08	Imokilly	Rostellan
	J O'Shea 0-6, R Honohan 0-1, B Cuthbert 0-1, D O'Mahony 0-1, C Lucey 0-1, M Hayes 0-1.		D O'Sullivan 1-1, D Barrett 0-3, K Coakley 0-3, V O'Sullivan 0-1.	Referee: J Geaney (Kilshannig)

30 June 2001 Second round replay	Bishopstown	1-11 - 2-07	Imokilly	Rostellan
	R Honohan 1-3, D O'Mahony 0-4, J O'Shea 0-3, C Lucey 0-1.		D Barrett 0-5, T McCarthy 1-1, K Coakley 1-0, B O'Callaghan 0-1.

- Douglas received a bye in this round.

=== Third round ===
29 June 2001 Third round	O'Donovan Rossa	0-14 - 1-10	Duhallow	Carrigadrohid
	J Werner 0-5, C McCarthy 0-3, J O'Driscoll 0-3, C Keohane 0-2, D Davis 0-1.		M O'Sullivan 1-5, Dermot O'Sullivan 0-4, Don O'Sullivan 0-1.	Referee: P Higgins (Ballincollig)

30 June 2001 Third round	Youghal	1-10 - 0-12	Douglas	Páirc Uí Chonaill, Cobh
	P Moylan 1-3, B Coleman 0-2, J Flynn 0-2, E Coleman 0-2, K Coleman 0-1.		W Coveney 0-4, C McCarthy 0-2, N Gannon 0-2, J Farrell 0-2, P Aherne 0-1, E Coveney 0-1.

30 June 2001 Third round	Bantry Blues	4-14 - 0-12	Avondhu	Macroom
	J Canty 2-4, P Clifford 2-1, D O'Neill 0-4, D Barron 0-2, P O'Regan 0-1, S McCarthy 0-1, P O'Rourke 0-1.		N Noonan 0-3, J O'Callaghan 0-3, E Pierce 0-3, A O'Driscoll 0-2, B O'Driscoll 0-1.

30 June 2001 Third round	University College Cork	0-14 - 2-10	St. Finbarr's	Páirc Uí Rinn, Cork
	I Twiss 0-4, B Sheehan 0-3, C Galvin 0-2, J Olden 0-2, C Keane 0-1, Damien Reidy 0-1, E Hanrahan 0-1.		F Murray 1-6, F O'Mahony 1-1, J O'Donoghue 0-1, K Kelleher 0-1, C McCarthy 0-1.

30 June 2001 Third round	Nemo Rangers	1-14 - 0-12	Ballincollig	Ovens
	C Corkery 1-7, JP O'Neill 0-3, J Masters 0-2, K Cahill 0-1, D Kavanagh 0-1.		M Greene 0-5, F Keohane 0-3, J Kelleher 0-2, L O'Toole 0-1, P O'Mahony 0-1.

30 June 2001 Third round	Carbery	5-16 - 0-10	Seandún	Kinsale
	K O'Sullivan 1-2, J O'Connell 1-1, B O'Sullivan 1-1, S Lewis 1-0, T O'Sullivan 1-0 (og), P Connolly 0-3, P Hegarty 0-3, T Deasy 0-2, P O'Connell 0-1, M Cronin 0-1, K Daly 0-1, K McMahon 0-1.		K O'Brien 0-5, D O'Connor 0-1, M O'Driscoll 0-1, C O'Sullivan 0-1, D Quinlan 0-1, JP Murphy 0-1.

1 July 2001 Third round	Doheneys	1-09 - 0-09	Castlehaven	Wolfe Tone Park, Bantry
	K Murray 1-2, S Deane 0-2, P Collins 0-2, B Nyhan 0-1, M O'Donovan 0-1, S Farr 0-1.		B Deasy 0-4, P Hurley 0-4, F Cahalane 0-1.

8 July 2001 Third round	Na Piarsaigh	0-11 - 1-05	St Michael's	Páirc Uí Rinn, Cork
	D Gardiner 0-3, JP Murphy 0-2, S O'Sullivan 0-2, G Casey 0-1, S McLoughlin 0-1, S Ó hAilpín 0-1, R Sweeney 0-1.		A Ryan 1-4, B O'Keeffe 0-1.

29 July 2001 Third round	Naomh Abán	0-09 - 2-05	Bishopstown	Ballyanly
	M Quinn 0-4, D O'Sullivan 0-2, J Lynch 0-2, G Óg Lynch 0-1.		J O'Shea 1-1, C Lucey 1-0, B Cuthbert 0-2, D O'Mahony 0-1, R Honohan 0-1.

- Clyda Rovers received a bye in this round.

=== Fourth round ===
29 July 2001 Fourth round	Bantry Blues	1-13 - 0-15	Clyda Rovers	Páirc Uí Rinn, Cork
	J Canty 0-5, P Clifford 1-1, P O'Rourke 0-2, S McCarthy 0-1, D O'Neill 0-1, D Barron 0-1, P Canty 0-1, G Canty 0-1.		P Holland 0-9, J Walsh 0-2, N O'Mullane 0-1, F Dorgan 0-1, D O'Brien 0-1, C O'Sullivan 0-1.

20 August 2001 Fourth round	Na Piarsaigh	0-12 - 1-09	Youghal	Castlemartyr
	C O'Sullivan 0-3, S Ó hAilpín 0-2, G Casey 0-2, S O'Sullivan 0-2, R Sweeney 0-1, B Murphy 0-1, J Gardiner 0-1.		JP Joyce 1-1, P O'Driscoll 0-3, J O'Flynn 0-2, E Coleman 0-2, M Walsh 0-1.

25 August 2001 Fourth round replay	Na Piarsaigh	1-10 - 0-12	Youghal	Castlemartyr
	C O'Sullivan 1-3, D Gardiner 0-3, S Ó hAilpín 0-1, R Sweeney 0-1, C Fitzgerald 0-1, G Casey 0-1.		P Moylan 0-4, O Coleman 0-2, J Flynn 0-2, D Byrne 0-1, JP Joyce 0-1, K Coleman 0-1, K Dempsey 0-1.

=== Quarter-finals ===
12 August 2001 Quarter-final	St. Finbarr's	2-08 - 0-13	O'Donovan Rossa	Clonakilty
	F Murray 1-4, J O'Donoghue 1-1, K Kelleher 0-2, M Ryan 0-1.		C McCarthy 0-5, J Werner 0-5, B Casey 0-2, C Keohane 0-1.	Referee: N Barrett (Carrigtwohill)

12 August 2001 Quarter-final	Carbery	2-11 - 0-11	Bishopstown	Castle Grounds, Macroom
	P Connolly 1-6, K O'Sullivan 1-0, B O'Sullivan 0-2, M O'Sullivan 0-1, D McCarthy 0-1, P Hegarty 0-1.		J O'Shea 0-5, R Honohan 0-3, C Lucey 0-2, B Healy 0-1.	Referee: R Murphy (Lyre)

18 August 2001 Quarter-final	Nemo Rangers	2-08 - 1-08	Dohenys	Brinny Sportsfield, Brinny
	C Corkery 0-5, N Corkery 1-0, G Murphy 1-0, JP O'Neill 0-1, M McCarthy 0-1, D Mehigan 0-1.		K Murray 1-0, J Collins 0-3, D Nyhan 0-2, S Farr 0-1, S Collins 0-1, C Crowley 0-1.

1 September 2001 Quarter-final	Bantry Blues	3-11 - 2-09	Na Piarsaigh	Carrigadrohid
	P Clifford 2-3, S McCarthy 1-1, P O'Rourke 0-3, J Canty 0-2, D O'Neill 0-1, S O'Neill 0-1.		J Gardiner 1-2, C O'Sullivan 1-1, G Casey 0-4, D Gardiner 0-2.	Referee: P Higgins (Ballincollig)

=== Semi-finals ===
30 August 2001 Semi-final	Nemo Rangers	0-18 - 0-11	St. Finbarr's	Páirc Uí Chaoimh, Cork
	C Corkery 0-5, N Corkery 0-4, G Murphy 0-2, D Mehigan 0-2, JP O'Neill 0-2, D Kavanagh 0-1, K Cahill 0-1, M Cronin 0-1.		F Murray 0-8, J O'Donoghue 0-1, R O'Mahony 0-1, N Hartigan 0-1.	Referee: M Collins (Clonakilty)

16 September 2001 Semi-final	Bantry Blues	1-12 - 0-07	Carbery	Sam Maguire Park, Dunmanway
	J Canty 1-3, P Clifford 0-4, S McCarthy 0-2, P O'Rourke 0-2, D Barron 0-1.		B O'Sullivan 0-4, M Cronin 0-1, D McCarthy 0-1, P Connolly 0-1.	Referee: J Geaney (Kilshannig)

=== Final ===
30 September 2001 Final	Nemo Rangers	1-14 - 0-06	Bantry Blues	Páirc Uí Chaoimh, Cork
	C Corkery 0-10, JP O'Neill 1-0, K Cahill 0-1, M Cronin 0-1, D Mehigan 0-1, A Cronin 0-1.		D Barron 0-3, P O'Rourke 0-1, P Clifford 0-1, D O'Neill 0-1.	Attendance: 9,147; Referee: G Harrington (Carrigaline)

== Championship statistics ==
=== Top scorers ===
Top scorers overall

Rank	Player	Club	Tally	Total	Matches	Average
1	Philip Clifford	Bantry Blues	7-13	34	6	5.66
2	Colin Corkery	Nemo Rangers	1-30	33	5	6.60
3	Fionán Murray	St. Finbarr's	2-24	30	4	7.50
4	James O'Shea	Bishopstown	1-21	24	5	4.80
5	Jeremy Canty	Bantry Blues	3-14	23	6	3.83
5	Mícheál Ó Cróinín	Naomh Abán	0-23	23	4	5.75
7	Pat Connolly	Carbery	1-14	17	4	4.25
8	Paul Moylan	Carbery	1-13	17	5	3.40
9	Paul Holland	Clyda Rovers	0-15	15	2	7.50
10	Mark Lewis	Aghada	0-13	13	2	6.50

In a single game

Rank	Player	Club	Tally	Total	Opposition
1	Jeremy Canty	Bantry Blues	2-04	10	Nemo Rangers
1	Colin Corkery	Nemo Rangers	1-07	10	Ballincollig
1	Colin Corkery	Nemo Rangers	0-10	10	Bantry Blues
4	Philip Clifford	Bantry Blues	2-03	9	Aghada
4	William Morgan	Nemo Rangers	2-03	9	Clonakilty
4	Philip Clifford	Bantry Blues	2-03	9	Na Piarsaigh
4	Pat Connolly	Carbery	1-06	9	Bishopstown
4	Fionán Murray	St. Finbarr's	1-06	9	UCC
4	Paul Holland	Clyda Rovers	0-09	9	Bantry Blues
10	David Nyhan	Dohenys	1-05	8	St Michael's
10	Mark O'Sullivan	Duhallow	1-05	8	O'Donovan Rossa
10	Mark Lewis	Aghada	0-08	8	Bantry Blues
10	Mícheál Ó Cróinín	Naomh Abán	0-08	8	Carrigdhoun
10	Fionán Murray	St. Finbarr's	0-08	8	Nemo Rangers

=== Miscellaneous ===
- As a result of their victory in the final, Nemo Rangers go level with Lees on the all-time roll of honour with 12 titles.
