= 2003 Cork Senior Football Championship =

Gaelic football competition

- Dates: 12 April 2003 – 19 October 2003
- Teams: 29
- Sponsor: Permanent TSB
- Champions: Castlehaven (13th title); Liam Collins (captain); James McCarthy (manager)
- Runners-up: Clonakilty; Nigel Hayes (captain); Eoin O'Mahony (manager)

Tournament statistics
- Matches played: 41
- Top scorer(s): Jurgen Werner (0-33)

The 2003 Cork Senior Football Championship was the 115th staging of the Cork Senior Football Championship since its establishment by the Cork County Board in 1887. The draw for the opening fixtures took place on 8 December 2002. The championship began on 12 October 2003 and ended on 19 October 2003.

Nemo Rangers entered the championship as the defending champions, however, they were beaten by Na Piarsaigh in the third round.

On 19 October 2003, Castlehaven won the championship following a 1-09 to 1–07 defeat of Clonakilty in the final. This was their third championship title overall and their first title since 1994.

O'Donovan Rossa's Jurgen Werner was the championship's top scorer with 0-33.

== Results ==
=== Preliminary round ===
12 April 2003 Preliminary round	St. Nicholas'	0-10 - 0-08	Bantry Blues	Kilmichael
	J Anderson 0-3, P O'Brien 0-3, D Cronin 0-2, E McCarthy 0-1, T O'Halloran 0-1.		P Clifford 0-2, J Canty 0-2, D Barron 0-2, G Canty 0-1, D O'Neill 0-1.

=== First round ===
12 April 2003 First round	Dohenys	1-07 - 0-06	Youghal	Ballincollig
	D Farr 1-0, S Farr 0-3, J Collins 0-2, D O'Sullivan 0-1, D Healy 0-1.		P Moylan 0-4, J Grace 0-1, K Dempsey 0-1.

12 April 2003 First round	O'Donovan Rossa	0-11 - 2-06	Na Piarsaigh	Clonakilty
	J Werner 0-6, C McCarthy 0-3, R Long 0-1, D O'Regan 0-1.		S Ó hAilpín 1-2, C O'Mahony 1-0, J Gardiner 0-3, C O'Sullivan 0-1.

13 April 2003 First round	Newcestown	1-04 - 1-10	Douglas	Páirc Liam Mhic Cárthaigh, Ballygarvan
	D Heffernan 1-0, P Condon 0-2, J O'Sullivan 0-2.		G McLoughlin 1-1, F O'Sullivan 0-2, C Hogan 0-2, C Dineen 0-1, W Coveney 0-1, J Farrell 0-1, J O'Keeffe 0-1, S Bermingham 0-1.

13 April 2003 First round	Aghada	1-07 - 1-03	Mallow	Rathcormac
	D Creedon 1-1, G Melvin 0-3, J O'Connell 0-2, K O'Keeffe 0-1.		J O'Sullivan 1-0, R Sheehan 0-1, T O'Riordan 0-1, C Kerrisk 0-1.

13 April 2003 First round	Ballincollig	0-03 - 1-03	Clyda Rovers	Donoughmore
	C Weste 0-2, M Greene 0-1.		P Kissane 1-0, P Holland 0-3.

13 April 2003 First round	Clonakilty	1-09 - 1-16	Castlehaven	Rossa Park, Skibbereen
	C O'Donovan 0-7, C Murphy 1-0, M Harrington 0-1, B Walsh 0-1.		P Hurley 0-8, B Collins 1-0, C Crowley 0-3, D Burns 0-2, B Deasy 0-1, F Cahalane 0-1, D Cahalane 0-1.

16 April 2003 First round	Bishopstown	1-09 - 2-13	St. Finbarr's	Páirc Uí Rinn, Cork
	J O'Shea 1-5, R Honohan 0-2, B Hussey 0-1, L Honohan 0-1.		F Murray 1-4, C McCarthy 1-3, R O'Mahony 0-3, J McCarthy 0-1, K Kelleher 0-1, R Curran 0-1.

19 April 2003 First round	Nemo Rangers	3-12 - 0-02	Bantry Blues	Sam Maguire Park, Dunmanway
	D Mehigan 2-1, C Corkery 0-6, M McCarthy 1-1, L O'Sullivan 0-2, A Cronin 0-1, A Morgan 0-1.		P Clifford 0-1, D Barron 0-1.

24 April 2003 First round	Naomh Abán	2-09 - 0-06	St Michael's	Páirc Uí Rinn, Cork
	M Ó Cróinín 1-5, Jason McCarthy 1-0, J McCarthy 0-1, C Twomey 0-1, D Cronin 0-1, D O'Sullivan 0-1.		D O'Connell 0-4, W Sherlock 0-2.

=== Second round ===
18 May 2003 Second round	Imokilly	3-09 - 0-17	Muskerry	Páirc Uí Rinn, Cork
	D O'Sullivan 0-5, P Ryan 1-1, J Deane 1-1, J O'Connor 1-1, S Collins 0-1.		S Twomey 0-7, S Prendeville 0-4, J White 0-2, L Conchammon 0-1, P Conchammon 0-1, A O'Shea 0-1, I Dorgan 0-1.

18 May 2003 Second round	Youghal	2-08 - 2-06	St Michael's	Shanagarry
	P Moylan 0-4, A Healy 1-0, C Coleman 1-0, S Landers 0-2, K Dempsey 0-1, E Coleman 0-1.		M Mulconroy 2-2, W Sherlock 0-2, D Dempsey 0-1, G McPolin 0-1.

30 May 2003 Second round	St. Nicholas'	0-07 - 1-13	Cork Institute of Technology	Páirc Uí Rinn, Cork
	P O'Brien 0-3, E McCarthy 0-2, D Cronin 0-1, J Anderson 0-1.		M Reidy 0-6, V Hurley 1-0, B Hegarty 0-2, DJ Fleming 0-2, B Dennehy 0-2, E O'Connor 0-1.

31 May 2003 Second round	Beara	2-06 - 1-13	Mallow	Ballineen
	BJ O'Sullivan 2-2, C Harrington 0-1, A O'Regan 0-1, D Wiseman 0-1, P Harrington 0-1.		C O'Riordan 1-4, J O'Sullivan 0-4, R Sheehan 0-3, D Lavin 0-1, P O'Riordan 0-1.

31 May 2003 Second round	Avondhu	1-07 - 1-16	O'Donovan Rossa	Kilmurry
	M Hennessy 1-0, N Noonan 0-2, S Maher 0-2, T Higgins 0-1, J O'Mahony 0-1, J O'Neill 0-1.		J Werner 0-5, C McCarthy 1-1, R Long 0-3, B Casey 0-2, N McCarthy 0-2, C Crowley 0-1, Dermot O'Sullivan 0-1, Donal O'Sullivan 0-1.

31 May 2003 Second round	University College Cork	0-13 - 2-07	Clonakilty	Henry Ford Park, Ballinascarty
	C Brennan 0-6, P Galvin 0-2, B Sheehan 0-2, K O'Keeffe 0-1, MD Cahill 0-1, R Hussey 0-1.		C O'Donovan 1-4, P Griffin 1-1, N McCarthy 0-1.

31 May 2003 Second round	Carbery	0-08 - 1-07	Ballincollig	Newcestown
	K O'Sullivan 0-4, S Hayes 0-2, J O'Connell 0-1, J O'Regan 0-1.		C Weste 1-6, C O'Sullivan 0-1.

1 June 2003 Second round	Duhallow	1-11 - 0-17	Bantry Blues	Macroom
	G Murphy 1-4, R Casye 0-4, N O'Sullivan 0-2, A O'Sullivan 0-1.		D Barron 0-7, S McCarthy 0-4, P O'Rourke 0-2, J Canty 0-2, G Canty 0-1, D O'Neill 0-1.

1 June 2003 Second round	Seandún	0-10 - 1-16	Newcestown	Coachford
	K O'Brien 0-4, F Murphy 0-2, A Keane 0-1, S Rea 0-1, R Scannell 0-1, P Triggs 0-1.		A O'Sullivan 1-2, P Condon 0-5, J O'Sullivan 0-4, H Curran 0-1, TJ Twomey 0-1, E Twomey 0-1, P Crowley 0-1, D Heffernan 0-1.

18 June 2003 Second round	Carrigdhoun	0-08 - 4-14	Bishopstown	Páirc Uí Rinn, Cork
	G Spillane 0-2, G Shanahan 0-2, K Ashman 0-1, A Murphy 0-1, J Murphy 0-1.		J O'Shea 1-7, R Honohan 1-2, J Murphy 1-1, D Barrett 1-0 (og), S Conlisk 0-1, L Honohan 0-1, M Cogan 0-1, D O'Sullivan 0-1.

3 July 2003 Second round replay	University College Cork	0-14 - 2-11	Clonakilty	Henry Ford Park, Ballinascarty
	B Harty 0-4, K O'Keeffe 0-3, M Phelan 0-3, P Murphy 0-2, D O'Sullivan 0-2.		C Murphy 0-6, P Griffin 1-1, S Quirke 1-0, T Anglin 0-1, C O'Donovan 0-1, C Calnan 0-1.

=== Third round ===
28 June 2003 Third round	Dohenys	0-13 - 1-08	Ballincollig	Kilmurry
	S Farr 0-7, K Murray 0-2, M O'Donovan 0-2, D Healy 0-2.		J Miskella 1-4, C Weste 0-2, C O'Sullivan 0-1, L O'Toole 0-1.

28 June 2003 Third round	Castlehaven	2-07 - 0-11	Clyda Rovers	Ballingeary
	S Connolly 1-0, F Cahalane 1-0, C Crowley 0-3, P Hurley 0-2, N Cahalane 0-1, B Collins 0-1.		P Kissane 0-7, F Dorgan 0-2, D Cronin 0-1, I O'Shea 0-1.

6 July 2003 Third round	Bishopstown	1-16 - 0-10	St. Nicholas'	Páirc Uí Chaoimh, Cork
	J O'Shea 0-11, R Honohan 1-1, J Murphy 0-2, N O'Donovan 0-1, C Doyle 0-1.		R Brosnan 0-6, N Harte 0-1, P O'Brien 0-1, T O'Halloran 0-1, L Leahy 0-1.

6 July 2003 Third round	St. Finbarr's	2-07 - 1-12	Douglas	Páirc Uí Chaoimh, Cork
	J O'Sullivan 2-0, R O'Mahony 0-3, C McCarthy 0-2, R Curran 0-1, J O'Donoghue 0-1.		J Farrell 1-2, F O'Sullivan 0-5, P White 0-2, C McCarthy 0-2, B Hanrahan 0-1.

6 July 2003 Third round	Cork Institute of Technology	1-13 - 2-08	Bantry Blues	Ballineen
	B Hegarty 1-1, DJ Fleming 0-2, R Keane 0-2, B Hickey 0-2, P Sheehan 0-2, S O'Sullivan 0-1, A O'Connor 0-1, B Dennehy 0-1, J Buckley 0-1.		D Barron 2-4, S McCarthy 0-2, G Canty 0-1, J Canty 0-1.

11 July 2003 Third round	Imokilly	1-13 - 1-11	Mallow	Páirc Mac Gearailt, Fermoy
	D O'Sullivan 0-8, T McCarthy 1-1, V O'Sullivan 0-2, P Fitzgerald 0-1, S Farrell 0-1.		C O'Riordan 1-3, J O'Sullivan 0-3, R Sheehan 0-3, D Lavin 0-1, A Aherne 0-1.

13 July 2003 Third round	Aghada	0-11 - 1-07	Naomh Abán	Ballincollig
	J O'Connell 0-3, E O'Neill 0-3, A Kelleher 0-2, B Flaherty 0-1, R Crowley 0-1, C O'Brien 0-1.		M Ó Cróinín 1-6, D O'Sullivan 0-1.

13 July 2003 Third round	Newcestown	1-05 - 0-14	O'Donovan Rossa	Sam Maguire Park, Dunmanway
	D Heffernan 1-1, D McCarthy 0-2, T Twomey 0-1, P Condon 0-1.		J Werner 0-6, C McCarthy 0-3, D O'Sullivan 0-1, S Crowley 0-1, R Long 0-1, B Casey 0-1, D Davis 0-1.

13 July 2003 Third round	Nemo Rangers	1-05 - 0-11	Na Piarsaigh	Páirc Uí Chaoimh, Cork
	C Corkery 1-3, J Masters 0-1, A Morgan 0-1.		J Gardiner 0-5, D Gardiner 0-2, C O'Mahony 0-2, C O'Sullivan 0-1, S McLoughlin 0-1.

20 July 2003 Third round	Clonakilty	1-13 - 0-10	Youghal	Páirc Uí Chaoimh, Cork
	C Murphy 0-5, Timmy Anglin 1-1, P Griffen 0-2, K Meade 0-2, Tony Anglin 0-1, J Connolly 0-1, S Quirke 0-1.		P Moylan 0-5, C Coleman 0-2, K Dempsey 0-1, B Coleman 0-1, M Walsh 0-1.

=== Fourth round ===
20 July 2003 Fourth round	O'Donovan Rossa	1-07 - 1-07	Aghada	Brinny
	P Nealon 1-0, N McCarthy 0-2, R Long 0-1, C McCarthy 0-1, R Casey 0-1, C Keohane 0-1, J Werner 0-1.		E O'Neill 1-1, J O'Connell 0-2, T O'Keeffe 0-1, D Creedon 0-1, G Melvin 0-1, B Morrissey 0-1.

2 August 2003 Fourth round replay	O'Donovan Rossa	2-09 - 2-08	Aghada	Brinny
	C McCarthy 1-1, C Keohane 1-1, J Werner 0-4, R Long 0-1, B Casey 0-1, D Davis 0-1.		T O'Keeffe 1-3, B O'Flaherty 1-0, G Melvin 0-1, D Creedon 0-1, K O'Connor 0-1, P O'Neill 0-1, E O'Neill 0-1.

24 August 2003 Fourth round	Na Piarsaigh	1-10 - 2-04	Dohenys	Charlie Hurley Park, Bandon
	S Ó hAilpín 1-2, J Gardiner 0-4, C O'Mahony 0-2, S McLoughlin 0-1, D Gardiner 0-1.		K Murray 1-0, M O'Donovan 1-0, S Farr 0-2, D Healy 0-1.

=== Quarter-finals ===
2 August 2003 Quarter-final	Castlehaven	2-10 - 1-11	Bishopstown	Clonakilty
	P Hurley 0-5, F Cahalane 1-1, B Collins 1-0, C Crowley 0-2, B Deasy 0-2.		S Conlesk 1-4, R Honohan 0-4, M Cogan 0-1, J Murphy 0-1, J O'Shea 0-1.

17 August 2003 Quarter-final	Douglas	0-09 - 1-04	Cork Institute of Technology	Páirc Uí Rinn, Cork
	F O'Sullivan 0-5, J Farrell 0-2, G McLoughlin 0-1, W Coveney 0-1.		DJ Fleming 1-2, R Mageean 0-1, S Kinsella 0-1.

21 September 2003 Quarter-final	Clonakilty	2-07 - 1-09	Imokilly	Páirc Liam Mhic Cárthaigh, Ballygarvan
	P Griffin 2-2, C Murphy 0-3, N Walsh 0-1, H Kenny 0-1.		J Deane 1-1, D Barrett 0-4, S Farrell 0-3, G Holland 0-1.

27 September 2003 Quarter-final	O'Donovan Rossa	0-17 - 1-09	Na Piarsaigh	Clonakilty
	J Werner 0-07, C McCarthy 0-4, J O'Driscoll 0-2, N McCarthy 0-1, F McCarthy 0-1, R Long 0-1, C Keohane 0-1.		S Ó hAilpín 1-1, J Gardiner 0-4, C O'Mahony 0-4.	Referee: N Barrett

=== Semi-finals ===
21 September 2003 Semi-final	Castlehaven	0-13 - 0-05	Douglas	Charlie Hurley Park, Bandon
	P Hurley 0-5, C Crowley 0-4, B Deasy 0-2, B Collins 0-1, D Burns 0-1.		F O'Sullivan 0-2, W Coveney 0-1, B Hanrahan 0-1, M Harrington 0-1.

5 October 2003 Semi-final	Clonakilty	1-11 - 1-09	O'Donovan Rossa	Sam Maguire Park, Dunmanway
	C Murphy 0-5, C O'Donovan 1-1, P Griffin 0-2, B Walsh 0-2, S Quirke 0-1.		C McCarthy 1-1, J Werner 0-4, N McCarthy 0-1, S Crowley 0-1, C Keohane 0-1, R Long 0-1.	Referee: D Linehan

=== Final ===
19 October 2003 Final	Castlehaven	1-09 - 1-07	Clonakilty	Páirc Uí Chaoimh, Cork
	C Crowley 1-4, S Connolly 0-3, P Hurley, free, and Bernie Collins 0-1 each.	Report	C Murphy 0-5, 0-4 frees, P Griffin 1-0, B Walsh and C Murray 0-1 each.	Attendance: 14,526; Referee: D Linehan (Nemo Rangers)

== Championship statistics ==
=== Top scorers ===
Overall

Rank	Player	Club	Tally	Total	Matches	Average
1	Jurgen Werner	O'Donovan Rossa	0-33	33	7	4.71
2	James O'Shea	Bishopstown	2-24	30	4	7.50
3	Conrad Murphy	Clonakilty	1-24	27	6	4.50
4	Pádraigh Griffin	Clonakilty	5-08	23	6	3.83
4	Conor McCarthy	O'Donovan Rossa	3-14	23	7	3.28
5	Paudie Hurley	Castlehaven	0-21	21	5	4.20
6	Declan Barron	Bantry Blues	2-14	20	4	5.00
7	Colin Crowley	Castlehaven	1-16	19	5	3.80
8	Mícheál Ó Cróinín	Naomh Abán	2-11	17	2	8.50
9	John Gardiner	Na Piarsaigh	0-16	16	4	4.00

In a single game

Rank	Player	Club	Tally	Total	Opposition
1	James O'Shea	Bishopstown	0-11	11	St. Nicholas'
2	Declan Barron	Bantry Blues	2-04	10	CIT
2	James O'Shea	Bishopstown	1-07	10	Carrigdhoun
3	Colin Weste	Ballincollig	1-06	9	Carbery
3	Mícheál Ó Cróinín	Naomh Abán	1-06	9	Aghada
4	Michael Mulconroy	St Michael's	2-02	8	Youghal
4	Brendan Jer O'Sullivan	Beara	2-02	8	Mallow
4	Pádraigh Griffin	Clonakilty	2-02	8	Imokilly
4	James O'Shea	Bishopstown	1-05	8	St. Finbarr's
4	Mícheál Ó Cróinín	Naomh Abán	1-05	8	St Michael's
4	Paudie Hurley	Castlehaven	0-08	8	Clonakilty
4	Diarmuid O'Sullivan	Imokilly	0-08	8	Mallow
