= Diarmuid McCarthy =

Irish Gaelic footballer (1956–2022)

Personal information
- Native name: Diarmuid Mac Cárthaigh (Irish)
- Born: 1956 Ballyvourney, County Cork, Ireland
- Died: 9 July 2022 (aged 66) Ballymakeera, County Cork, Ireland
- Occupation: Publican

Sport
- Sport: Gaelic football
- Position: Right wing-forward
Clubs
- Years: Club
- Naomh Abán → Muskerry
Club titles
- Cork titles: 0
Inter-county*
Years	County	Apps (scores)
1982–1983	Cork	5 (1-04)
Inter-county titles
- Munster titles: 1
- All-Irelands: 0
- NHL: 0
- All Stars: 0
- *Inter County team apps and scores correct as of 15:53, 30 June 2017.

Diarmuid McCarthy (1956 – 9 July 2022) was an Irish Gaelic footballer who played at club level with Naomh Abán and Muskerry and at inter-county level with the Cork senior football team. He usually lined out as a forward.

== Career ==
McCarthy first played Gaelic football at juvenile and underage levels with Naomh Abán. He was just 17-years-old when he was part of the club's adult team that won the Cork JFC title in 1973 before later winning a Cork IFC title in 1977. His performances at club level also earned inclusion on the Muskerry divisional team.

McCarthy first appeared on the inter-county scene during a two-year tenure with the Cork minor football team. He was at centre-forward when Cork beat Mayo in the 1974 All-Ireland minor final. He also spent two years with the Cork under-21 team. McCarthy made his senior team debut during the 1982 Munster SFC. He was an unused substitute for Cork's defeat of Kerry in the 1983 Munster final. McCarthy ended his inter-county career as captain of the Cork junior football team that beat Warwickshire in the 1989 All-Ireland junior final.

== Death ==
McCarthy died after a long illness on 9 July 2022, aged 66.

== Honours ==
Naomh Abán

- Cork Intermediate Football Championship: 1977
- Cork Junior Football Championship: 1973
- Mid Cork Junior A Football Championship: 1973, 1988
- Mid Cork Under-21 football Championship: 1973

Cork

- Munster Senior Football Championship: 1983
- All-Ireland Junior Football Championship: 1989 (c)
- Munster Junior Football Championship: 1989 (c)
- All-Ireland Minor Football Championship: 1974
- Munster Minor Football Championship: 1973, 1974
