= 1988 Cork Junior A Football Championship =

- Teams: 8
- Champions: Naomh Abán (2nd title)
- Runners-up: Clyda Rovers

The 1988 Cork Junior A Football Championship was the 90th staging of the Cork Junior A Football Championship since its establishment by Cork County Board in 1895.

The final was played on 11 December 1988 at the Carrigadrohid Grounds, between Naomh Abán and Clyda Rovers, in what was their first ever meeting in the final. Naomh Abán won the match by 1–08 to 2–04 to claim their second championship title overall and a first title in 15 years.

== Results ==
=== Final ===
11 December 1988 Final	Naomh Abán	1-08 - 2-04	Clyda Rovers	Carrigadrohid Grounds
