= 1999 Cork Intermediate Football Championship =

Gaelic football competition

- Sponsor: Permanent TSB
- Champions: Naomh Abán (2nd title); Gary Mór Ó Loingsigh (captain)
- Runners-up: Castletownbere; Séamus HArrington (captain)

The 1999 Cork Intermediate Football Championship was the 64th staging of the Cork Intermediate Football Championship since its establishment by the Cork County Board in 1909.

The final, a replay, was played on 21 November 1999 at Rossa Park in Skibbereen, between Naomh Abán and Castletownbere, in what was their first ever meeting in the final. Naomh Abán won the match by 1-09 to 1-06 to claim their second championship title overall and a first title in 22 years.

== Results ==
=== Final ===
31 October 1999 Final	Naomh Abán	1-08 - 2-05	Castletownbere	Rossa Park

=== Final replay ===
21 November 1999 Final replay	Naomh Abán	1-09 - 1-06	Castletownbere	Rossa Park
