= Pádraigh Griffin =

Irish Gaelic footballer (1975-2022)

Personal information
- Native name: Pádraigh Ó Gríofa (Irish)
- Nickname: Griff
- Born: 1975 Clonakilty, County Cork, Ireland
- Died: 22 October 2022 (aged 47) Death directly related to Tinnitus & Hyperacusis Clonakilty, County Cork, Ireland
- Occupation: Secondary school teacher
- Height: 5 ft 8 in (173 cm)

Sport
- Sport: Gaelic Football
- Position: Full-forward
Club
Years	Club	Apps (scores)
1993–2012	Clonakilty	58 (19–79)
Club titles
- Cork titles: 2
College
- Years: College
- University College Cork
College titles
- Sigerson titles: 0
Inter-county
- Years: County
- 1997–2004: Cork
Inter-county titles
- Munster titles: 0
- All-Irelands: 0
- NFL: 0

Pádraigh Griffin (1975 – 22 October 2022) was an Irish Gaelic footballer. At club level he played with Clonakilty and was also a member of the Cork senior football team.

== Playing career ==
Griffin first played Gaelic football at juvenile and underage levels with Clonakilty. He also lined out as a schoolboy with Clonakilty Community College and won an All-Ireland VSFC title with the Cork vocational schools' team in 1994. Griffin first played for Clonakilty at adult level as a member of the junior team. He was a member of the club's senior team that won the Cork SFC title in 1996, before claiming a second winners' medal in 2009.

Griffin's performances at club level earned a call-up to the Cork under-21 team in 1996. He was drafted onto the senior team in 1997. Griffin made a number of appearances in various National League campaigns before being included on the Cork championship team. He also lined out for the junior team.

== Personal life and death ==
His father, Pat Griffin, was a two-time All-Ireland SFC medal-winner with Kerry in 1969 and 1970. Griffin died on 22 October 2022, at the age of 47.

== Honours ==
Clonakilty

- Cork Senior Football Championship: 1996, 2003
- West Cork Under-21 Football Championship: 1996 (c)

Cork

- All-Ireland Vocational Schools Championship: 1994
