= Jack Ferriter =

Irish Gaelic footballer

Personal information
- Born: County Kerry, Ireland

Sport
- Sport: Gaelic football
- Position: Forward
Club
- Years: Club
- An Daingean Bishopstown
College
- Years: College
- Tralee IT
College titles
- Sigerson titles: 2
Inter-county
- Years: County
- 1996-1999: Kerry
Inter-county titles
- All Stars: 0

Jack Ferriter is a former Gaelic footballer from Dingle, County Kerry, Ireland. He was a member of several Kerry underage teams in the 1990s with Dingle CBS, Dingle GAA, and Kerry (Minor, U-21, Junior, and Senior). Kerry won an All Ireland Minor title in 1994 with him as captain, and until 2014 was the last Kerry man to do so. Ferriter suffered a shoulder injury which curtailed a promising senior career with Kerry at a relatively early age.

== Club ==
He played his club football with Dingle. He won a Kerry Intermediate Football Championship in 1996 with the club, as well as a number of West Kerry Senior Football Championship titles.

He also played with the West Kerry divisional team. He won Minor and Under 21 championships with the team, and played in the 1996 Kerry Senior Football Championship.

He later played with Bishopstown in Cork. He lined out in the 2004 Cork Senior Football Championship final when Bishopstown lost to Carbery GAA.

Ferriter has also played in the United States with Shannon Blues GAA (Boston) and St Barnabas GAA (New York).

== Underage ==
He first played with the Kerry minor team in 1994, a team he was the captain of. Kerry won the Munster title with little fuss with Ferriter scoring in each game, wins over Limerick scored 2 pts, Cork scored 2-03 and Clare in the final scored 4 pts. He scored 4 pts in the All-Ireland semi-final win over Armagh. In the final Kerry faced Galway. Ferriter scored 6 pts as Kerry took the title on a 0–16 to 1-07 scoreline. He went on to collect the cup as the team's captain.

He moved on to the counties Under 21 team in 1995. He was a sub during the Munster championship, as Kerry won the title by beating Waterford in final. He started at Left Half Forward in the All-Ireland semi-final win over Donegal. In the final Kerry faced Mayo. The sides ended level 2–12 to 3-09 and a replay was needed. In the second game Ferriter was Man of the Match after scoring 1–01 in a 3–10 to 1–12 win. This gave him an All-Ireland Under 21 medal.

Injury saw him miss much of Kerry's 1996 campaign. His only appearance was when he came on as a sub in the All-Ireland final win against Cavan. It was his second Under 21 All-Ireland medal.

He was still underage in 1997 but missed the whole campaign.

== Colleges ==
He also played on the Tralee IT teams that won Sigerson Cups in 1998 and 1999. Ferriter was awarded the Player of the Tournament in the Sigerson Cup competition of 1998 as the college made it three titles in a row.

== Junior ==
Having played with the senior team during the later 90's he had fallen out of favor. He joined the Kerry junior team in 2001. Kerry had a surprise loss to Tipperary.

He was again part of the junior team in 2002. He played at Center Forward as Kerry beat Limerick, Cork and Tipperary to win the Munster title. He scored 1-05 as Kerry overcame Mayo in the All-Ireland semi-final. He lined out in his first All-Ireland final since his Under 21 days when Kerry faced Wicklow. While Kerry were expected to win, Wicklow scored four goals in a surprise win. The final was his last game with Kerry at any level.

== Senior ==
On the back of his displays with the Under 21's Ferriter was brought into the Kerry senior panel for the 1995/96 National League. He played in all six of Kerry's game, including the quarter-final loss to Cork. He played no part in that summers championship.

Injury saw him miss out on the whole of the 1997 season.

He returned to make an appearance during the 1997/98 League. He was part of the panel during the championship, winning a Munster championship title as a sub, but played no games.

He again played during the 1998/99 National League playing four games. This was his last time playing with Kerry at senior level.

He was linked with joining Cavan, Galway and Cork at different times but never played championship football.
