= Conrad Murphy =

Irish Gaelic footballer

Personal information
- Native name: Conrad Ó Murchú (Irish)
- Born: 18 February 1982 (age 44) Clonakilty, County Cork, Ireland
- Occupation: Solicitor
- Height: 6 ft 0 in (183 cm)

Sport
- Sport: Gaelic football
- Position: Centre-forward
Club
- Years: Club
- Clonakilty
Club titles
- Cork titles: 0
College
- Years: College
- 2000-2003: University College Cork
College titles
- Sigerson titles: 0
Inter-county*
Years	County	Apps (scores)
2001-2003	Cork	4 (0-01)
Inter-county titles
- Munster titles: 1
- All-Irelands: 0
- NFL: 0
- All Stars: 0
- *Inter County team apps and scores correct as of 13:04, 18 April 2020.

Conrad Murphy (born 18 February 1982) is an Irish former Gaelic footballer who played for club side Clonakilty, at inter-county level with the Cork senior football team and for the national team. He usually lined out in the forwards.

== Honours ==
Cork

- Munster Senior Football Championship: 2002
- All-Ireland Minor Football Championship: 2000
- Munster Minor Football Championship: 2001
