= 1996 Cork Intermediate Football Championship =

Gaelic football competition

- Champions: Clyda Rovers (1st title); Derry Cronin (captain); Timmy O'Callaghan (manager)
- Runners-up: Carrigaline; Seán Stack (captain); Neil O'Keeffe (manager)

The 1996 Cork Intermediate Football Championship was the 61st staging of the Cork Intermediate Football Championship since its establishment by the Cork County Board in 1909. The draw for the opening round fixtures took place on 10 December 1995.

The final was played on 8 September 1996 at Páirc Uí Chaoimh in Cork, between Clyda Rovers and Carrigaline, in what was their first ever meeting in a final. Clyda Rovers won the match by 0-16 to 1-05 to claim their first ever championship title.

== Results ==
=== Final ===
8 September 1996 Final	Clyda Rovers	0-16 - 1-05	Carrigaline	Páirc Uí Chaoimh
	R Walsh 0-8, T O'Mullane 0-4, C O'Sullivan 0-2, F Dorgan 0-1, C Cronin 0-1.		O Conlon 1-3, M Doody 0-1, G Farrissey 0-1.	Referee: N Barrett (Carrigtwohill)
