= John Corcoran (sports administrator) =

Irish Gaelic games administrator (1959–2016)

Personal information
- Native name: Seán Ó Corcoráin (Irish)
- Nickname: Big John
- Born: 16 October 1959 Ballineen, County Cork, Ireland
- Died: 19 January 2016 (aged 56) Ballineen, County Cork, Ireland

Sport
- Sport: Gaelic football
Club management
- Years: Club
- 2004: Carbery

John Corcoran (16 October 1959 – 19 January 2016) was an Irish Gaelic games administrator. His career included almost every role in Gaelic football, including player, coach, manager, selector, chairman, county board delegate and referee.

Having played for St Mary's and later become a referee, Corcoran became a member of the St Mary's committee at a young age and was treasurer and secretary of the club in the early 1980s before becoming chairman in 1992. This was also the role he held at the time of his death, having also held the position of Carbery chairman. Prior to assuming the chair of the divisional committee, he had been PRO and vice-chair and also chaired the Munster third-level GAA body, sitting on the Munster Council as a result.

Corcoran managed the Carbery divisional side to the 2004 championship, which brought him to wider attention with the Cork county team. As a selector under Billy Morgan, Corcoran was part of the management team which won the 2006 Munster SFC title and reached the following year's All-Ireland SFC final, losing to Kerry.

In his time as a University College Cork selector from 2010 onwards, the college won the Sigerson Cup twice and reached the final on three occasions.
