= 1977 Cork Intermediate Football Championship =

Intermediate Football Championship, played in Cork in 1977

- Champions: Naomh Abán (1st title)
- Runners-up: Castlehaven

The 1977 Cork Intermediate Football Championship was the 42nd staging of the Cork Intermediate Football Championship since its establishment by the Cork County Board in 1909. The draw for the opening round fixtures took place on 30 January 1977.

The final was played on 2 October 1977 at Charlie Hurley Park in Bandon, between Naomh Abán and Castlehaven, in what was their first ever meeting in the final. Naomh Abán won the match by 1-08 to 1-03 to claim their first ever championship title.

== Results ==
=== Final ===
2 October 1977 Final	Naomh Abán	1-08 - 1-03	Castlehaven	Charlie Hurley Park
