= 1973 Cork Junior Football Championship =

- Dates: 9 September – 28 October 1973
- Teams: 8
- Champions: Naomh Abán (2nd title)
- Runners-up: Mitchelstown

Tournament statistics
- Matches played: 8
- Goals scored: 13 (1.63 per match)
- Points scored: 120 (15 per match)

The 1973 Cork Junior Football Championship was the 75th staging of the Cork Junior Football Championship since its establishment by Cork County Board in 1895. The championship ran from 9 September to 28 October 1973.

The final was played on 28 October 1973 at the Athletic Grounds in Cork, between Naomh Abán and Mitchelstown, in what was their first ever meeting in the final. Naomh Abán won the match by 2–15 to 0–05 to claim their first ever championship title.

== Qualification ==
Division	Championship	Champions
Avondhu	North Cork Junior A Football Championship	Mitchelstown
Beara	Beara Junior A Football Championship	Adrigole
Carbery	South West Junior A Football Championship	Castlehaven
Carrigdhoun	South East Junior A Football Championship	Kinsale
Duhallow	Duhallow Junior A Football Championship	Dromtarriffe
Imokilly	East Cork Junior A Football Championship	Glenville
Muskerry	Mid Cork Junior A Football Championship	Naomh Abán
Seandún	City Junior A Football Championship	Douglas

== Results ==
=== Quarter-finals ===
16 September 1973 Quarter-final	Douglas	1–11 – 1–05	Castlehaven	Charlie Hurley Park

16 September 1973 Quarter-final	Naomh Abán	0–08 – 0–04	Urhan	Wolfe Tone Park

16 September 1973 Quarter-final	Glenville	0–06 – 0–06	Kinsale	Cork Athletic Grounds

30 September 1973 Quarter-final	Mitchelstown	2–06 – 0–07	Dromtarriffe	Castletownroche Grounds

30 September 1973 Quarter-final replay	Glenville	0–07 – 4–04	Kinsale	Ballinlough Grounds

=== Semi-finals ===
7 October 1973 Semi-final	Mitchelstown	2–08 – 0–09	Douglas	Castlelyons Grounds
	J Barrett 0–6, B Honohan 1–1, D Russell 1–1.		C Kavanagh 0–5, B Larkin 0–2, M O'Regan 0–1, T O'Leary 0–1.

21 October 1973 Semi-final	Naomh Abán	0–14 – 1–06	Kinsale	Cloughduv Grounds
	J Lynch 0–6, S Mullane 0–5, C Twomey 0–1, D Scannell 0–1, D McCarthy 0–1.		C O'Callaghan 1–0, T Fogarty 0–2, J Hurley 0–2, M Burke 0–1, JJ Hurley 0–1.	Referee: L Meade (Ballinascarthy)

=== Final ===
28 October 1973 Final	Naomh Abán	2–15 – 0–05	Mitchelstown	Cork Athletic Grounds
	D McCarthy 1–2, D Scannell 0–5, J Lynch 0–4, P Lynch 1–0, M Scannell 0–2, S Mullane 0–2.		J Barrett 0–3, B Honohan 0–1, JJ Lynch 0–1.
