= Colin Crowley =

Irish Gaelic footballer

Personal information
- Native name: Cóilín Ó Crualaoich (Irish)
- Born: 1977 (age 48–49) Castlehaven, County Cork, Ireland
- Occupation: Wellness centre owner

Sport
- Sport: Gaelic football
- Position: Right corner-forward
Club
Years	Club	Apps (scores)
1995-2008	Castlehaven	47 (16-101)
Club titles
- Cork titles: 1
- Munster titles: 1
Inter-county*
Years	County	Apps (scores)
2002-2005	Cork	11 (0-06)
Inter-county titles
- Munster titles: 1
- All-Irelands: 0
- NFL: 0
- All Stars: 0
- *Inter County team apps and scores correct as of 15:25, 17 April 2020.

Colin Crowley (born 1977) is an Irish retired Gaelic footballer who played for club side Castlehaven, at inter-county level with the Cork senior football team and with Munster.

== Career ==
Crowley first played Gaelic football at juvenile and underage levels with Castlehaven before joining the club's senior team as a 17-year-old. His performances in these grades resulted in his inclusion on the Cork minor and under-21 teams. Crowley enjoyed his first major club success when Castlehaven won the Munster Club Championship in 1997. He won a County Under-21 Championship medal the following year. Crowley joined the Cork senior football team in 2002 and won a Munster Championship medal in his debut year. He won a County Senior Championship title with Castlehaven in 2003, a victory which resulted in him taking over the captaincy of the Cork senior team in 2004.

== Career statistics ==
=== Club ===
Team	Season	Cork		Munster		All-Ireland		Total	
Team	Season	Apps	Score	Apps	Score	Apps	Score	Apps	Score
Castlehaven	1995-96	1	0-03	—		—		1	0-03
Castlehaven	1996-97	2	0-00	—		—		2	0-00
Castlehaven	1997-98	6	3-06	3	1-09	2	0-03	11	4-18
Castlehaven	1998-99	3	0-02	—		—		3	0-02
Castlehaven	1999-00	2	0-03	—		—		2	0-03
Castlehaven	2000-01	5	2-18	—		—		5	2-18
Castlehaven	2001-02	2	1-01	—		—		2	1-01
Castlehaven	2002-03	2	3-07	—		—		2	3-07
Castlehaven	2003-04	5	1-16	1	0-06	—		6	1-22
Castlehaven	2004-05	2	1-07	—		—		2	1-07
Castlehaven	2005-06	4	3-11	—		—		4	3-11
Castlehaven	2006-07	2	0-01	—		—		2	0-01
Castlehaven	2007-08	2	1-05	—		—		2	1-05
Castlehaven	2008-09	3	0-03	—		—		3	0-03
Career total		41	15-83	4	1-15	2	0-03	47	16-101

=== Inter-county ===
Team	Year	National League			Munster		All-Ireland		Total	
Team	Year	Division	Apps	Score	Apps	Score	Apps	Score	Apps	Score
Cork	2002	Division 1A	7	0-07	4	0-01	2	0-02	13	0-10
Cork	2003	Division 1A	7	2-05	1	0-00	1	0-01	9	2-06
Cork	2004	Division 1A	5	0-04	1	0-00	2	0-02	8	0-06
Cork	2005	Division 1A	2	0-05	0	0-00	0	0-00	2	0-05
Cork	Career total		21	2-21	6	0-01	5	0-05	32	2-27

== Honours ==
Castlehaven

- Munster Senior Club Football Championship: 1997
- Cork Senior Football Championship: 2003
- Cork Under-21 A Football CHampionship: 1998
- West Cork Under-21 A Football Championship: 1998

Cork

- Munster Senior Football Championship: 2002

Sporting positions
Preceded by Martin Cronin	Cork Senior Football Captain; 2004	Succeeded by Eoin Sexton
