= Philip Clifford =

Cork Gaelic footballer

Personal information
- Born: 15 March 1979 (age 47) Bantry, County Cork
- Occupation: Pub owner
- Height: 6 ft 0 in (183 cm)

Sport
- Sport: Gaelic football
- Position: Full-forward
Club
- Years: Club
- 1990s–present: Bantry Blues
Club titles
- Cork titles: 1
Inter-county
Years	County	Apps (scores)
1999–2005	Cork	19 (3–30)
Inter-county titles
- Munster titles: 2
- NFL: 1
- All Stars: 1

Philip Clifford (born 15 March 1979, in Bantry, County Cork) is an Irish former Gaelic footballer who played for his local club Bantry Blues, winning a Cork County championship in 1998, and was captain of the senior Cork county team from 1999 until 2005.

Sporting positions
Preceded by Damian O'Neill	Cork Senior Football Captain; 1999	Succeeded by Joe Kavanagh
