= Mícheál Ó Cróinín =

Irish Gaelic footballer and sports broadcaster

Personal information
- Native name: Mícheál Ó Cróinín (Irish)
- Born: 1977 (age 48–49) Baile Bhúirne, County Cork, Ireland
- Height: 5 ft 11 in (180 cm)

Sport
- Sport: Gaelic football
- Position: Right wing-forward
Clubs
- Years: Club
- Naomh Abán; University College Cork
Club titles
- Cork titles: 1
- Munster titles: 1
Inter-county
| Years | County | Apps (scores) |
| 1999-2005 | Cork | 11 (0-16) |
Inter-county titles
- Munster titles: 2
- All-Irelands: 0
- NFL: 1
- All Stars: 0

Mícheál Ó Cróinín (born 1977) is an Irish retired Gaelic footballer and current sports broadcaster. His league and championship career with the Cork senior team spanned seven seasons from 1999 to 2005.

Born in Baile Bhúirne, County Cork, Ó Cróinín was introduced to Gaelic football by his father, a former chairman of the local club. He began his club career as a centre-back with the Naomh Abán under-21 team before eventually progressing onto the senior team with whom he won a county intermediate championship medal. While studying at University College Cork Ó Cróinín won a set of Munster and county senior championship medals in 1999.

Ó Cróinín made his debut on the inter-county scene at the age of sixteen when he was picked on the Cork minor team. He enjoyed two championship seasons with the minor team, before later joining the under-21 side, however, he ended his underage career with championship success. Ó Cróinín made his senior debut during the 1998-99 league. Over the course of the next seven seasons, Ó Cróinín established himself as a key player for Cork and won two Munster medals and one National Football League medal. He played his last game for Cork in July 2005.

In retirement from playing Ó Cróinín has forged a media career as a co-commentator and analyst with TG4's Irish language Gaelic games show GAA Beo. His wife, Nollaig Cleary, is a nine-time All-Ireland medal winner with Cork.

== Honours ==
University College Cork

- Munster Senior Club Football Championship (1): 1999
- Cork Senior Football Championship (1): 1999

Naomh Abán

- Cork Intermediate Football Championship (1): 1999

Cork

- Munster Senior Football Championship (2): 1999, 2002
- National Football League (1): 1998-99
