= Fionán Murray =

Irish Gaelic footballer

Personal information
- Native name: Fionán Ó Muirí (Irish)
- Born: Cork, Ireland

Sport
- Sport: Gaelic football
- Position: Forward
Club
- Years: Club
- 1990s-present: St Finbarr's
Club titles
- Cork titles: 0
Inter-county
- Years: County
- 1998-2004: Cork
Inter-county titles
- Munster titles: 2
- All-Irelands: 0
- NFL: 0
- All Stars: 0

Fionán Murray (born 1979 in Cork, Ireland) is an Irish sportsperson. He plays Gaelic football with his local club St Finbarr's and was a member at senior level of the Cork county team from 1998 until 2004.
