= Naomh Abán GAA =

GAA club in County Cork

Naomh Abán
- Naomh Abán
- Founded: 1888
- County: Cork
- Colours
- Grounds: Páirc Naomh Abán; Páirc Íosagáin
- Coordinates: 51°56′20″N 9°08′55″W

Playing kits
Standard colours

Senior Club Championships
	All Ireland	Munster champions	Cork champions
Football:	0	0	0

Naomh Abán GAA is a Gaelic Athletic Association club located in Baile Bhuirne, County Cork, Ireland. The club is affiliated to the Muskerry Board and the Cork County Board and is solely concerned with the game of Gaelic football.

== History ==
Located in the village of Baile Bhuirne, about 22 km west of Macroom on the Cork-Kerry border, Naomh Abán GAA Club was established in 1888. Named after Saint Abbán, the club has spent most of its existence operating in the junior grade, winning six Mid Cork JFC titles between 1928 and 1973. The sixth of these titles was later converted into a Cork JFC title, following a 2–15 to 0–05 win over Mitchelstown in the final. After back-to-back defeats in finals, Naomh Abáb secured senior status for the first time, when the club beat Castlehaven by 1-08 to 1-03 to claim the Cork IFC title in 1977.

Naomh Abán subsequently returned to the junior ranks but won a second Cork JFC title in 1988, after a one-point win over Clyda Rovers in the final. The club returned to the senior ranks over a decade later in 1999, when a 1-09 to 1-06 defeat of Castletownbere secured Naomh Abán's second Cork IFC title.

== Grounds ==
Naomh Abán's home ground is Páirc Naomh Abán. The official opening by President of the GAA, Con Murphy took place on 25 February 1979, and featured a challenge match between Cork and Kerry. The club is also served by a second pitch called Páirc Iosagáin.

== Honours ==
- Comórtas Peile na Gaeltachta (8): 1975, 1979, 1980, 1981, 1982, 2000, 2003, 2005
- Cork Intermediate Football Championship (2): 1977, 1999
- Cork Junior A Football Championship (2): 1973, 1988
- Mid Cork Junior A Football Championship: (6) 1928, 1967, 1970, 1971, 1973, 1988
- Mid Cork Junior B Football Championship: (3) 1971, 1995, 2014, 2018
- Mid Cork Junior C Football Championship: (3) 1996, 2007, 2009
- Mid Cork Under 21 football Championships: (11) 1965, 1966, 1967, 1968, 1969, 1973, 1976, 1980, 1987, 1995, 2012, 2020
- Mid Cork Minor Football Championships: (9) 1965, 1966, 1967, 1981, 1992, 1993, 1996, 1997, 2010
- Cork Minor B Football Championship: (1) 1992
- Rebel Óg County Minor B Football Championship: (3) 2012, 2014, 2018, 2019
- Rebel Óg West Minor B Football Championship: (3) 2012, 2014, 2018, 2019

== Notable players ==
- Anthony Lynch: All-Ireland SFC-winner (2010)
- Mick Scannell: All-Ireland SFC-winner (1973)
