= Steven O'Brien (Cork Gaelic footballer) =

Irish Gaelic footballer

Personal information
- Native name: Stiofán Ó Briain (Irish)
- Born: 28 December 1969 (age 56) Turners Cross, Cork, Ireland
- Occupation: Bank official
- Height: 6 ft 0 in (183 cm)

Sport
- Sport: Gaelic football
- Position: Full-back
Club
- Years: Club
- 1987-2003: Nemo Rangers
Club titles
- Cork titles: 6
- Munster titles: 6
- All-Ireland Titles: 3
Inter-county
Years	County	Apps (scores)
1988-1995	Cork	20 (0-01)
Inter-county titles
- Munster titles: 6
- All-Irelands: 2
- NFL: 1
- All Stars: 3

Steven O'Brien (born 28 December 1969) is an Irish Gaelic football manager and former player. In a career that spanned three decades he played at club level with Nemo Rangers and at inter-county level with the Cork senior football team.

== Career ==
O'Brien first played for the Nemo Rangers club as a five-year-old, however, he first came to prominence as a schoolboy with Coláiste Chríost Rí with whom he won the Hogan Cup in 1987. That same year he made his senior debut with Nemo and went on to win three All-Ireland Club Championships over the following 15 seasons. O'Brien first appeared on the inter-county scene as a defender with the Cork minor team that lost successive All-Ireland finals. He later captained the Cork under-21 to the 1989 All-Ireland Under-21 Championship title. By this stage O'Brien had already joined the Cork senior football team and won the first of six Munster Championship titles in his debut season in 1988. He later added a National League to his collection before claiming successive All-Ireland medals in 1989 and 1990. O'Brien was also selected for Munster and was manager of the Nemo Rangers team that secured the 2015 Cork County Championship.

== Honours ==
=== Player ===
Coláiste Chríost Rí

- Hogan Cup: 1987
- Corn Uí Mhuirí: 1987

Nemo Rangers

- All-Ireland Senior Club Football Championship: 1989, 1994 (c), 2003
- Munster Senior Club Football Championship: 1987, 1988, 1993 (c), 2000, 2001, 2002
- Cork Senior Football Championship: 1987, 1988, 1993 (c), 2000, 2001, 2002
- Cork Under-21 Football Championship: 1988, 1989

Cork

- All-Ireland Senior Football Championship: 1989, 1990
- Munster Senior Football Championship: 1988, 1989, 1990, 1993, 1994 (c), 1995
- National Football League: 1988-89
- All-Ireland Under-21 Football Championship: 1989 (c)
- Munster Under-21 Football Championship: 1989 (c)
- Munster Minor Football Championship: 1986, 1987

=== Manager ===
Nemo Rangers

- Cork Senior Football Championship: 2015
- Cork Under-21 Football Championship: 2012

Sporting positions
Preceded by Mick McCarthy	Cork Senior Football Captain; 1994	Succeeded by Niall Cahalane
Achievements
Preceded by Mick McCarthy	All-Ireland Senior Club Football Final winning captain 1994	Succeeded by Mick Dillon
