= Eoin O'Mahony (Gaelic footballer) =

Irish Gaelic footballer

Personal information
- Native name: Eoin Ó Mathúna (Irish)
- Born: 1963 (age 62–63) Clonakilty, County Cork, Ireland
- Occupation: Garda Síochána
- Height: 5 ft 11 in (180 cm)

Sport
- Sport: Gaelic Football
- Position: Centre-forward
Clubs
Years	Club	Apps (scores)
1979-1987 1988-1991 1992-2000	Clonakilty; Nemo Rangers; Clonakilty	20 (11-72); 15 (6-52); 16 (1-43)
Club titles
- Cork titles: 2
- Munster titles: 1
- All-Ireland Titles: 1
Inter-county*
Years	County	Apps (scores)
1981-1989	Cork	7 (1-04)
Inter-county titles
- Munster titles: 2
- All-Irelands: 1
- NFL: 1
- All Stars: 0
- *Inter County team apps and scores correct as of 00:50, 4 January 2013.

Eoin O'Mahony (born 1963) is an Irish former Gaelic footballer and manager who played for club sides Clonakilty and Nemo Rangers and at inter-county level with the Cork senior football team. He usually lined out as a forward.

== Playing career ==
O'Mahony first came to Gaelic football prominence at juvenile and underage levels with the Clonakilty club in West Cork. He made his senior club debut in 1979 and was part of the Clonakilty teams that lost county finals in 1983 and 1985. O'Mahony subsequently transferred to the Nemo Rangers club and was part of the All-Ireland Club Championship-winning team in 1989. He later re-joined the Clonakilty team and won a County Championship title with them in 1996. O'Mahony first appeared on the inter-county scene as a member of the Cork minor football team that won the 1981 All-Ireland Minor Championship. A number of seasons with the Cork under-21 team yielded a Munster Under-21 Championship title. O'Mahony was straight out of the minor grade when he earned selection with the Cork senior football team. He was an unused substitute when Cork defeated Mayo in the 1989 All-Ireland final. O'Mahony's other honours include two Munster Championship medals and a National Football League title.

== Managerial career ==
Shortly after his retirement from club activity, O'Mahony took over as manager of the Clonakilty senior team. He was in charge of the team that lost the 2003 county final to Castlehaven.

== Honours ==
Clonakilty

- Cork Senior Football Championship: 1996

Nemo Rangers

- All-Ireland Senior Club Football Championship: 1989
- Munster Senior Club Football Championship: 1988
- Cork Senior Football Championship: 1988

Cork

- All-Ireland Senior Football Championship: 1989
- Munster Senior Football Championship: 1983, 1989
- National Football League: 1988-89
- Munster Under-21 Football Championship: 1982
- All-Ireland Minor Football Championship: 1981
- Munster Minor Football Championship: 1981
