= Mick Slocum =

Irish Gaelic footballer

Personal information
- Native name: Mícheál Slócam (Irish)
- Born: 18 March 1965 (age 61) Wilton, Cork, Ireland
- Occupation: Haulage firm director
- Height: 6 ft 0 in (183 cm)

Sport
- Sport: Gaelic football
- Position: Right wing-back
Club
- Years: Club
- St Finbarr's
Club titles
- Cork titles: 1
- Munster titles: 1
- All-Ireland Titles: 1
Inter-county
Years	County	Apps (scores)
1987–1992	Cork	10 (0–04)
Inter-county titles
- Munster titles: 4
- All-Irelands: 2
- NFL: 1
- All Stars: 1

Michael Slocum (born 18 March 1965) is an Irish Gaelic football coach and former player. He was an All-Ireland-winner at club level with St Finbarr's and at senior inter-county level with the Cork county team.

== Career ==
Slocum first came to prominence at underage level with St Finbarr's, the club with which he eventually won the All-Ireland Club Championship title during a successful senior career. He first appeared on the inter-county scene as captain of the Cork minor team that lost the 1983 All-Ireland minor final to Derry, before winning three successive All-Ireland Under-21 Championship titles. Slocum subsequently joined the Cork senior football team and won the first of four successive Munster Championship titles in his debut season in 1987. He later added a National League title to his collection before claiming successive All-Ireland medals at right wing-back in 1989 and 1990. An All-Star-winner for the latter victory, Slocum also served as a coach an club and inter-county levels.

== Honours ==
St Finbarr's

- All-Ireland Senior Club Football Championship: 1987
- Munster Senior Club Football Championship: 1986
- Cork Senior Football Championship: 1985
- Cork Under-21 Football Championship: 1985, 1986
- Cork Minor Football Championship: 1982, 1983

Cork

- All-Ireland Senior Football Championship: 1989, 1990
- Munster Senior Football Championship: 1987, 1988, 1989, 1990
- National Football League: 1988-89
- All-Ireland Under-21 Football Championship: 1984, 1985, 1986
- Munster Under-21 Football Championship: 1984, 1985, 1986
- Munster Minor Football Championship: 1983 (c)

Sporting positions
Preceded by Mick Evans	Cork Minor Football Coach; 2007-2009	Succeeded by Brian Cuthbert
Achievements
Preceded by Tony Davis	All-Ireland Under-21 Football Final winning captain 1986	Succeeded by Joe Cunningham
