= Teddy McCarthy =

Irish hurler and Gaelic footballer (1965–2023)

Personal information
- Native name: Tadhg Mac Cárthaigh (Irish)
- Nickname: Teddy Mac
- Born: 1 July 1965 Glanmire, County Cork, Ireland
- Died: 6 June 2023 (aged 57) Glanmire, County Cork, Ireland
- Occupation: Sales rep
- Height: 5 ft 9 in (175 cm)

Sport
- Football Position: Midfield
- Hurling Position: Midfield
Clubs
Years	Club	Apps (scores)
1982–1999 1982–1997 1984–1987	Sarsfields; Glanmire → Imokilly	17 (3–52); 17 (0–15)
Club titles
	Football	Hurling
Cork titles	2	0
Inter-county
Years	County	Apps (scores)
1985–1996 1986–1996	Cork (SF); Cork (SH)	28 (1–09); 22 (2–18)
Inter-county titles
	Football	Hurling
Munster Titles	7	3
All-Ireland Titles	2	2
League titles	1	1
All-Stars	1	0

Thaddeus "Teddy" McCarthy (1 July 1965 – 6 June 2023) was an Irish hurler and Gaelic footballer who played as a midfielder at senior level for the Cork county football and hurling teams. In an eleven-year senior inter-county playing career, McCarthy played for the Cork senior hurling and football teams, winning major honours with both. He is the only male dual player to win All-Ireland senior hurling and football medals in a single year.

McCarthy joined the Cork senior football team in 1985. Between then and 1996 he won two All-Ireland medals, six Munster medals and one All-Star. McCarthy's ten-year career with the Cork senior hurlers saw him win two All-Ireland medals, three Munster medals and one National Hurling League medal.

At club level McCarthy played for Sarsfields and Glanmire.

In retirement from playing McCarthy moved into coaching and team management. At club level he served as manager of the Sarsfield's and Bandon hurling teams. At inter-county level he was a selector for both the Cork senior hurling and football teams. McCarthy also served as manager of the Laois senior hurling team.

His son, Cian McCarthy, was a member of the Cork senior hurling team between 2010 and 2016.

== Early life ==
Born and raised in Glanmire, County Cork, McCarthy first played Gaelic games to a high standard as a student at the North Monastery. He was a member of the North Mon team that won the Harty Cup title in 1981.

== Playing career ==
=== Club ===
McCarthy played his club hurling with Sarsfields and his club football with Glanmire. He also lined out with divisional side Imokilly.

In 1984 he was a member of the Imokilly team that reached the final of the football championship. A 1–14 to 2–7 of double hopefuls St. Finbarr's gave Imokilly the victory and gave McCarthy a championship medal.

Imokilly failed to retain their title, however, the divisional team reached the county final once again in 1986. Once again it was St. Finbarr's who provided the opposition, however, this time they were the reigning champions. McCarthy won a second championship medal following a narrow 2–4 to 0–9 victory.

In 1987, Glanmire's footballers reached the final of the intermediate championship. A 3–5 to 0–6 win over Fermoy gave McCarthy a championship medal in this grade.

=== Inter-county ===
McCarthy first played inter-county football at underage levels for Cork. He won a Munster medal in the minor grade in 1983 following a 1–11 to 1–5 defeat of Tipperary. McCarthy later lined out in the All-Ireland final, however, Derry won by 0–8 to 1–3.

McCarthy later joined the Cork under-21 team where he had more successes. He missed Cork's victory in the Munster final of 1984, however, he came on as a substitute against Mayo in the subsequent All-Ireland final. Cork won that game by 0–9 to 0–6 giving McCarthy an All-Ireland medal.

1985 saw McCarthy find a regular place on the Cork under-21 starting fifteen. He added a Munster medal to his collection following an eleven-point win over Clare. The subsequent All-Ireland final saw McCarthy play at centre-forward against Derry. Cork avenged their defeat at minor level two years previously by beating Derry by 0–14 to 1–8. It was McCarthy's second All-Ireland medal in the under-21 grade.

In 1986, Cork continued their provincial success at under-21 level. A narrow one-point win over Tipperary gave McCarthy his second Munster medal. He later played in a third successive All-Ireland final with Offaly providing the opposition. The game saw Cork win convincingly on a score line of 3–16 to 0–12. It was McCarthy's third consecutive All-Ireland medal and his last game in the under-21 grade.

By this stage, McCarthy had been noticed by the Cork selectors and he was named as a substitute on the Cork senior team for the 1986 Munster final against Clare. Cork won on that occasion making it five-in-a-row of Munster titles, however, McCarthy was an un-used substitute. Following that victory, he went on holidays and missed Cork's All-Ireland semi-final against Antrim. Cork were "less than convincing" in that match and McCarthy was surprised on his return to Ireland to find that he was to make his championship debut in the All-Ireland final against Galway. While Galway were favourites to take the title, Cork won on a scoreline of 4–13 to Galway's 2–15. This four-point win gave Cork the title and gave McCarthy his first senior All-Ireland medal.

In 1987, McCarthy was a firm fixture on both the Cork hurling and football teams. While the hurlers lost their provincial crown to Tipperary, Cork broke Kerry's stranglehold on provincial football with a 0–13 to 1–5 victory in the Munster football final. It was McCarthy's first Munster Senior Football Championship medal. The subsequent All-Ireland final saw Cork play Meath for the first time in twenty years. Cork went into an early lead, however, it was Meath who led by a point at half-time. The second half saw Larry Tompkins kick six of his eight frees wide, resulting in a 1–14 to 0–11 defeat for Cork.

1988 saw McCarthy collect a second Munster football medal with a narrow 1–14 to 0–16 win over Kerry. Cork later qualified for their second consecutive All-Ireland final with Meath providing the opposition once again. Cork went ahead after just three minutes when McCarthy scored the only goal of five consecutive All-Ireland final appearances for Cork. Meath fought back and secured a 0–12 to 1–9 draw. In the replay, Meath were reduced to fourteen men with the sending off of Gerry McEntee. Despite being outnumbered, Meath won the game by 0–13 to 0–12.

1989 began with McCarthy adding a third Munster medal to his collection following another win over Kerry. The subsequent All-Ireland final saw Mayo play Cork. Mayo failed to score for the last nineteen minutes, and Cork won the game by 0–17 to 1–11. It was McCarthy's first All-Ireland football medal, an honour which made him the fifteenth player to be a dual All-Ireland medal winner. More personal honours were to follow when he was presented with an All-Star award. McCarthy was also presented with the Texaco Footballer of the Year award in 1989.

During 1990, McCarthy was a member of the senior hurling team, but missed Cork's victory over Tipperary in the Munster final. He also missed the Munster football tie as Cork beat Kerry by 2–23 to 1–11. The All-Ireland final that year pitted Cork's hurlers against Galway for the second time in four years, with McCarthy lining out at midfield. Galway were the bookies favourites and justified this tag by going seven points ahead. Cork fought back with inputs from Tomás Mulcahy and went on to win a high-scoring game by 5–15 to 2–21. It was McCarthy's second All-Ireland hurling medal. Two weeks after this victory, McCarthy was back in Croke Park playing in the All-Ireland football final. Old rivals Meath were the opponents on this occasion as the two sides met for the third time in four years. Once again the game was a close affair with Cork's Colm O'Neill being sent off. Despite being reduced to fourteen men, Cork won the game by 0–11 to 0–9. The Double was done and McCarthy "wrote himself into the storied pages of GAA history" by becoming the first (and, as of 2023, the only) player to win All-Ireland football and hurling medals in the same season.

In 1992, McCarthy had more success with the Cork hurlers. Despite already having two All-Ireland medals in that code, he had yet to win a Munster medal. That changed in 1992 when he came on as a substitute to help Cork defeat Limerick by 1–22 to 3–11. Cork later qualified for the All-Ireland final where Kilkenny were the opposition. Kilkenny played against a strong wind in the first half and were only two points down at the interval thanks to a goal by D.J. Carey. Further goals by John Power and Michael Phelan gave Kilkenny a 3–10 to 1–12 victory.

In 1993, McCarthy added to his medal tally. The start of the year saw him collect a National Hurling League title following a three-game series with Wexford. Cork's hurling championship hopes later ended on their first outing. Despite this, McCarthy captured a fourth Munster football medal as Tipperary lost in the provincial final. Another All-Ireland final appearance beckoned as Derry provided the opposition. The game was yet another close encounter; however, a late goal won the day for Derry who secured a 1–14 to 2–8 victory.

The defeat in the All-Ireland final was avenged somewhat in 1994 as Cork defeated Tipperary in the provincial football final. McCarthy came on as a substitute in that 2–19 to 3–9 victory to collect a fifth Munster medal. However, Cork were later defeated by eventual champions Down in the All-Ireland semi-final.

In 1995, Cork defeated Kerry by 0–15 to 1–9, with McCarthy coming on as a substitute once again to collect his sixth and final Munster medal. The All-Ireland semi-final was a similar situation to the previous year as eventual champions Dublin defeated Cork by 1–12 to 0–12.

This was McCarthy's last big occasion with the Cork footballers. He continued playing with the senior hurling team in 1996, however, Cork were defeated by Limerick for the first time in seventy-five years at Páirc Uí Chaoimh. This defeat saw the conclusion of McCarthy's inter-county career.

=== Inter-provincial ===
McCarthy also played with Munster in the inter-provincial football competition. He lined out with his province on a number of occasions, however, he never collected a Railway Cup medal.

=== International rules ===
McCarthy also played with Ireland in the International Rules series of games in 1986. He made one appearance for his country in the third meeting of Ireland and Australia, but was sent off after scoring a point. Ireland went on to win the three-game series.

== Managerial career ==
=== Sarsfield's ===
In late 2001 McCarthy took over as manager of the Sarsfield's senior hurling team. During his two-year stint in charge he guided the team to senior hurling championship semi-finals in 2002 and 2003. In both years they bowed out to eventual winners Blackrock and Newtownshandrum. Under McCarthy, Sarsfield's also won the East Cork championship in 2003 and the Munster club league in 2002. He was however dropped as manager in 2004.

By 2008 McCarthy was back as a selector under Bertie Óg Murphy. That year, the club reached the championship decider for the first time in over a decade. A narrow 2–14 to 2–13 victory over Bride Rovers gave Sarsfield's the championship title, a first since 1957.

=== Cork ===
In 2007 McCarthy was named as a selector under manager Teddy Holland in the new Cork senior football management set-up. The appointment was problematic from the beginning, as the Cork footballers refused to play under Holland's management as the County Board changed the system of allowing the manager to pick his own selectors. The Cork senior hurling team also went on strike in sympathy with their football counterparts. Holland, McCarthy and the other selectors had refused to stand down, but County Board delegates voted for their dismissal to bring to an end the 97-day dispute.

Just under a year later, in November 2008, McCarthy was named as one of Gerald McCarthy's two new Cork hurling selectors. Once again he entered a dissatisfied camp as the Cork hurlers were unhappy about Gerald McCarthy's reappointment as manager. The team eventually went on strike and refused to play under McCarthy's management. Cork fielded a completely new team in the opening rounds of the National Hurling League before the selectors resigned along with Gerald McCarthy in March 2009.

McCarthy also served as a selector, for two seasons, under Ger FitzGerald's management of the Cork under-21 hurling team.

=== Bandon ===
McCarthy had some successes as manager of the Bandon intermediate hurling team. In 2011, the club reached the final of the intermediate championship. A 2–14 to 0–7 defeat of Fr. O'Neill's gave Bandon the title and gave McCarthy a success as manager.

The following season, McCarthy's Bandon reached the final of the premier intermediate championship. A 1–19 to 1–12 defeat was the result in the 2012 competition.

=== Laois ===
In October 2011 McCarthy was appointed manager of the Laois senior hurling team for a three-year term. His opening season with the team proved to be a trying one, with the county failing to pick up a single point from five games on their way to relegation from Division 1B of the National Hurling League. They opened up their Leinster campaign with a win over Carlow before falling to Dublin by twenty-two points and then suffering a twenty-five-point deficit against Limerick in the All-Ireland qualifiers. McCarthy tendered his resignation as manager of the Laois hurling team after just one season in charge, citing work commitments.

== Death ==
McCarthy died on 6 June 2023, at the age of 57.

== Honours ==
=== Player ===
North Monastery

- Harty Cup: 1981

Glanmire

- Cork Intermediate Football Championship: 1987 (c)

Imokilly

- Cork Senior Football Championship: 1984, 1986

Cork

- All-Ireland Senior Hurling Championship: 1986, 1990
- All-Ireland Senior Football Championship: 1989, 1990
- Munster Senior Hurling Championship: 1986, 1990, 1992
- Munster Senior Football Championship: 1987, 1988, 1989, 1990, 1993, 1994, 1995
- National Hurling League: 1992–93
- National Football League: 1988–89
- All-Ireland Under-21 Football Championship: 1985, 1986
- Munster Under-21 Football Championship: 1984, 1985, 1986
- Munster Minor Football Championship: 1983

=== Management ===
Sarsfields

- Cork Senior Hurling Championship: 2008

Bandon

- Cork Intermediate Hurling Championship: 2011

Awards
Preceded by Robbie O'Malley	Texaco Footballer of the Year; 1989	Succeeded by Shea Fahy
Sporting positions
Preceded by Brendan Fennelly	Laois Senior Hurling Manager; 2011–2012	Succeeded by Séamus Plunkett
