= Paul McGrath (Gaelic footballer) =

Irish Gaelic footballer

Personal information
- Native name: Pól Mac Craith (Irish)
- Born: 23 May 1966 (age 60) Tralee, County Kerry, Ireland
- Occupation: Engineer
- Height: 5 ft 11 in (180 cm)

Sport
- Sport: Gaelic football
- Position: Right wing-forward
Club
- Years: Club
- 1985-1998: Bishopstown
Club titles
- Cork titles: 0
College
- Years: College
- University College Cork
College titles
- Sigerson titles: 1
Inter-county
Years	County	Apps (scores)
1988-1996	Cork	19 (0-23)
Inter-county titles
- Munster titles: 4
- All-Irelands: 2
- NFL: 1
- All Stars: 2

Paul McGrath (born 23 May 1966) is an Irish former Gaelic footballer. In a career that spanned two decades he played at club level with Bishopstown and at inter-county level with the Cork senior football team.

== Career ==
McGrath first came to prominence at underage level with Bishopstown before spending over a decade lining out for the club's senior team. He first appeared on the inter-county scene as a member of the Cork under-21 team, winning successive All-Ireland Under-21 Championship titles in 1985 and 1986. McGrath subsequently joined the Cork senior football team and won the first of five Munster Championship title in his debut season in 1988. He later added a National League title to his collection before claiming successive All-Ireland medals at right corner-forward in 1989 and 1990. McGrath was an All-Star-winner for the latter victory.

== Honours ==
University College Cork

- Sigerson Cup: 1988

Cork

- All-Ireland Senior Football Championship: 1989, 1990
- Munster Senior Football Championship: 1988, 1989, 1990, 1994, 1995
- National Football League: 1988-89
- All-Ireland Under-21 Football Championship: 1985, 1986
- Munster Under-21 Football Championship: 1985, 1986
