= 1988 Cork Senior Football Championship =

Gaelic football competition

- Dates: 24 April 1988 – 30 October 1988
- Teams: 22
- Champions: Nemo Rangers (9th title); Ephie Fitzgerald (captain); Billy Morgan (manager)
- Runners-up: Duhallow; John Fintan Daly (manager)

Tournament statistics
- Matches played: 23
- Goals scored: 37 (1.61 per match)
- Points scored: 401 (17.43 per match)
- Top scorer(s): Niall O'Connor (1-25)

The 1988 Cork Senior Football Championship was the 100th staging of the Cork Senior Football Championship since its establishment by the Cork County Board in 1887. The draw for the opening round fixtures took place on 13 December 1987. The championship began on 24 April 1988 and ended on 30 October 1988.

Nemo Rangers entered the championship as the defending champions.

On 30 October 1988, Nemo Rangers won the championship following a 2-08 to 0-10 defeat of Duhallow in the final. This was their ninth championship title overall and their second title in succession.

Duhallow's Niall O'Connor was the championship's top scorer with 1-25.

== Team changes ==
=== To Championship ===
Promoted from the Cork Intermediate Football Championship

- Glanmire

=== From Championship ===
Regraded to the Cork Intermediate Football Championship

- Passage

== Results ==
=== First round ===
| 24 April 1988 First round | Castlehaven | 0-08 - 1-07 | Nemo Rangers | Clonakilty |
| | L Tompkins 0-6, F Collins 0-2. | | N Cahalane 1-0 (og), T Nation 0-2, E Fitzgerald 0-2, E O'Mahony 0-2, M Dorgan 0-1. | Referee: P O'Donovan (Bantry Blues) |

| 24 April 1988 First round | Seandún | 0-04 - 1-09 | O'Donovan Rossa | Clonakilty |
| | G Murphy 0-2, P Duggan 0-1, D Sheehan 0-1. | | M McCarthy 1-1, P Davis 0-3, B Carmody 0-2, D O'Donovan 0-1, D O'Driscoll 0-1, C O'Donovan 0-1. | Referee: D Collins (Kinsale) |

| 24 April 1988 First round | St. Nicholas' | 1-01 - 3-11 | Muskerry | Ballinora |
| | V Hedderman 1-0, P Murphy 0-1. | | G Manley 1-4, J Neville 1-4, M Kelleher 1-1, K Creed 0-1, J O'Connor 0-1. | Referee: G Harrington |

| 24 April 1988 First round | Glanmire | 0-10 - 0-06 | Castletownbere | Macroom |
| | T McCarthy 0-6, T Murphy 0-2, P O'Callaghan 0-1, D Kenneally 0-1. | | G O'Sullivan 0-3, N Crowley 0-1, N Murphy 0-1, B O'Driscoll 0-1. | Referee: R Murphy (Lyre) |

| 24 April 1988 First round | Beara | 0-02 - 1-15 | Avondhu | Macroom |
| | M O'Sullivan 0-1, P Murphy 0-1. | | R Sheehan 0-6, B Stack 1-1, J Barrett 0-4, C O'Sullivan 0-2, P Nelligan 0-1, W O'Riordan 0-1. | Referee: M Brosnan (Caheragh) |

| 24 April 1988 First round | Imokilly | 0-07 - 1-07 | Duhallow | Kildorrery |
| | M Spillane 0-6, M Hennessy 0-1. | | P Healy 1-0, J Dennehy 0-3, T Healy 0-3, N O'Connor 0-1. | Referee: D Casey (Ballyclough) |

=== Second round ===
| 24 April 1988 Second round | St. Finbarr's | 1-10 - 0-07 | Na Piarsaigh | Páirc Uí Chaoimh, Cork |
| | D Barry 0-6, M Barry 1-0, C Ryan 0-2, K McCarthy 0-1, R O'Dwyer 0-1. | | T O'Sullivan 0-2, M Mullins 0-1, J Twomey 0-1, R McDonnell 0-1, P O'Connor 0-1, D Sheehan 0-1. | Referee: F Murphy |

| 24 April 1988 Second round | Millstreet | 3-08 - 0-13 | Midleton | Kildorrery |
| | B McSweeney 2-0, A Barry 0-5, D O'Mahony 1-0, L Dennehy 0-1, E Grimes 0-1, G O'Leary 0-1. | | G Glavin 0-5, N O'Neill 0-2, S O'Brien 0-2, J Boylan 0-2, C O'Neill 0-2. | Referee: P O'Brien (Mallow) |

| 1 May 1988 Second round | Clonakilty | 1-03 - 0-08 | Bishopstown | Charlie Hurley Park, Bandon |
| | M O'Neill 1-0, A Bluitt 0-1, H Moynihan 0-1, D Walsh 0-1. | | P McGrath 0-5, M McGrath 0-1, T Hayes 0-1, M Burke 0-1. | Referee: E Porter (Brian Dillons) |

| 8 May 1988 Second round | University College Cork | 1-09 - 2-09 | Glanmire | Riverstown |
| | M Fitzgerald 1-3, O Moynihan 0-3, V Murphy 0-1, J Costelloe 0-1, M Murphy 0-1. | | R Lotty 2-0, T McCarthy 0-2, P O'Callaghan 0-2, T Murphy 0-2, D Kenneally 0-1, Tim McCarthy 0-1, G McElhinney 0-1. | Referee: P Cronin (St. Finbarr's) |

| 4 June 1988 Second round | Avondhu | 0-09 - 0-09 | Carrigdhoun | Clonmult Memorial Park, Midleton |
| | R Sheehan 0-5, C O'Donovan 0-1, B Stack 0-1, M Dolan 0-1, W O'Riordan 0-1. | | G Slyne 0-5, C O'Donovan 0-2, D Kiely 0-1, F Crowley 0-1. | Referee: B Cody (Midleton) |

| 4 June 1988 Second round | O'Donovan Rossa | 2-11 - 1-14 | Carbery | Sam Maguire Park, Dunmanway |
| | M McCarthy 0-9, F Kearney 1-0, P Davis 1-0, B Carmody 0-1, T O'Donoghue 0-1. | | J Caulfield 1-3, S Dineen 0-5, K Santry 0-3, N Crowley 0-3. | Referee: F Murphy |

| 4 June 1988 Second round | Nemo Rangers | 1-14 - 1-04 | St Michael's | Ballinlough |
| | E Fitzgerald 1-9, M Dorgan 0-2, E O'Mahony 0-1, S Fahy 0-1, D Allen 0-1. | | I Ahern 1-0, J Quilter 0-2, D Buckley 0-2. | Referee: J O'Leary (Na Piarsaigh) |

| 12 June 1988 Second round | Duhallow | 1-11 - 0-06 | Muskerry | Carrigadrohid |
| | N O'Connor 1-6, J Dennehy 0-3, D O'Mahony 0-1, D Culloty 0-1. | | J Neville 0-4, D Creedon 0-1, J O'Driscoll 0-1. | Referee: E Porter (Brian Dillons) |

| 18 June 1988 Second round replay | Avondhu | 0-14 - 0-09 | Carrigdhoun | Clonmult Memorial Park, Midleton |
| | R Sheehan 0-5, B Stack 0-2, P Harrington 0-2, D Pyne 0-1, C O'Sullivan 0-1, W O'Riordan 0-1, P Sheehan 0-1, W O'Sullivan 0-1. | | G Slyne 0-5, D Fitzgerald 0-2, D Kiely 0-1, C O'Donovan 0-1. | Referee: B Cody (Midleton) |

| 10 July 1988 Second round replay | O'Donovan Rossa | 1-07 - 0-15 | Carbery | Sam Maguire Park, Dunmanway |
| | M McCarthy 0-4, G O'Driscoll 1-0, D O'Donovan 0-2, D Davis 0-1. | | M Dineen 0-5, K Santry 0-3, N Crowley 0-3, E Murphy 0-2, J Caulfield 0-2. | Referee: F Murphy |

=== Quarter-finals ===
| 9 July 1988 Quarter-final | Bishopstown | 0-12 - 1-08 | Avondhu | Castlelyons |
| | P McGrath 0-7, M Burke 0-2, G O'Mahony 0-1, J Egan 0-1, A O'Sullivan 0-1. | | J Barrett 1-4, T Mannix 0-2, W O'Riordan 0-1, P Harrington 0-1. | Referee: B Cody (Midleton) |

| 9 July 1988 Quarter-final | Duhallow | 2-05 - 1-05 | St. Finbarr's | Donoughmore |
| | J Dennehy 1-1, N O'Connor 0-4, D O'Mahony 1-0. | | C Ryan 1-0, J Cremin 0-2, T Leahy 0-1, J Keating 0-1, M Slocum 0-1. | Referee: D Casey (Ballyclough) |

| 10 July 1988 Quarter-final | Nemo Rangers | 3-15 - 0-05 | Millstreet | Clondrohid |
| | E O'Mahony 2-3, D Allen 1-1, M Dorgan 0-3, S O'Brien 0-2, E Fitzgerald 0-2, T Nation 0-2, S Fahy 0-1, G O'Regan 0-1. | | L Dennehy 0-2, B McSweeney 0-1, E Grimes 0-1, C Cotter 0-1. | Referee: E Porter (Brian Dillons) |

| 24 July 1988 Quarter-final | Carbery | 0-06 - 3-05 | Glanmire | Ballinspittle |
| | K Santry 0-3, J Cotter 0-2, N Crowley 0-1. | | P O'Callaghan 1-1, N Mulvihill 1-0, L McElhinney 1-0, T McCarthy 0-2, T Murphy 0-1, P Smith 0-1. | Referee: D Collins (Clonakilty) |

=== Semi-finals ===
| 27 August 1988 Semi-final | Duhallow | 0-11 - 0-07 | Bishopstown | Macroom |
| | N O'Connor 0-7, D O'Connor 0-1, D O'Mahony 0-1, P O'Connor 0-1, R Dennehy 0-1. | | P Cahill 0-3, P McGrath 0-3, J Egan 0-1. |

| 28 August 1988 Semi-final | Nemo Rangers | 2-21 - 0-06 | Glanmire | Páirc Uí Chaoimh, Cork |
| | T Nation 1-5, D Allen 1-3, E O'Mahony 0-6, M Dorgan 0-2, S Fahy 0-2, T Dalton 0-1, S O'Brien 0-1, G O'Regan 0-1. | | L Hedderman 0-2, S McElhinney 0-1, T McCarthy 0-1, B Lotty 0-1, D Kenneally 0-1. | Referee: E Porter (Brian Dillons) |

=== Final ===
| 30 October 1988 Final | Nemo Rangers | 2-08 - 0-10 | Duhallow | Páirc Uí Chaoimh, Cork |
| | D Allen 1-1, E Fitzgerald 1-0, E O'Mahony 0-3, T Dalton 0-2, T Nation 0-2. | | N O'Connor 0-7, T Healy 0-2, P O'Connor 0-1. | Referee: D Casey (Ballyclough) |

== Championship statistics ==
=== Top scorers ===
| Rank | Player | Club | Tally | Total | Matches | Average |
|---|---|---|---|---|---|---|
| 1 | Niall O'Connor | Duhallow | 1-25 | 28 | 5 | 5.60 |
| 2 | Eoin O'Mahony | Nemo Rangers | 2-15 | 21 | 5 | 4.20 |
| 3 | Ephie Fitzgerald | Nemo Rangers | 2-13 | 19 | 5 | 3.80 |
| 4 | Mick McCarthy | O'Donovan Rossa | 1-14 | 17 | 3 | 5.66 |
| 5 | Ronan Sheehan | Avondhu | 0-16 | 16 | 4 | 4.00 |
| 6 | Dinny Allen | Nemo Rangers | 3-06 | 15 | 5 | 3.00 |
| 6 | Paul McGrath | Bishopstown | 0-15 | 15 | 3 | 5.00 |
| 8 | Tony Nation | Nemo Rangers | 1-11 | 14 | 5 | 2.80 |
| 9 | John Neville | Muskerry | 1-08 | 11 | 2 | 5.50 |
| 9 | John Barrett | Avondhu | 1-08 | 11 | 3 | 3.66 |
| 9 | Teddy McCarthy | Glanmire | 0-11 | 11 | 4 | 2.75 |

Top scorers in a single game

| Rank | Player | Club | Tally | Total | Opposition |
|---|---|---|---|---|---|
| 1 | Ephie Fitzgerald | Nemo Rangers | 1-09 | 12 | St Michael's |
| 2 | Eoin O'Mahony | Nemo Rangers | 2-03 | 9 | Millstreet |
| 2 | Niall O'Connor | Duhallow | 1-06 | 9 | Muskerry |
| 2 | Mick McCarthy | O'Donovan Rossa | 0-09 | 9 | Carbery |
| 5 | Tony Nation | Nemo Rangers | 0-09 | 9 | Glanmire |
| 6 | Ger Manley | Muskerry | 1-04 | 7 | St. Nicholas' |
| 6 | John Neville | Muskerry | 1-04 | 7 | St. Nicholas' |
| 6 | John Barrett | Avondhu | 1-04 | 7 | Bishopstown |
| 6 | Paul McGrath | Bishopstown | 0-07 | 7 | Avondhu |
| 6 | Niall O'Connor | Duhallow | 0-07 | 7 | Bishopstown |
| 6 | Niall O'Connor | Duhallow | 0-07 | 7 | Nemo Rangers |

=== Miscellaneous ===
- Glanmire qualified for the semi-finals of the championship for the very first time.
