= Tony Davis (Gaelic footballer) =

Irish Gaelic football player (born 1964)

Personal information
- Native name: Antaine Dáibhis (Irish)
- Nickname: Tony
- Born: 29 November 1964 (age 61) Skibbereen, County Cork, Ireland
- Occupation: Crime prevention officer
- Height: 6 ft 1 in (185 cm)

Sport
- Sport: Gaelic football
- Position: Left wing-back
Club
- Years: Club
- O'Donovan Rossa
Club titles
- Cork titles: 1
- Munster titles: 1
- All-Ireland Titles: 1
Inter-county
| Years | County | Apps (scores) |
| 1984-1994 | Cork | 28 (0-03) |
Inter-county titles
- Munster titles: 7
- All-Irelands: 2
- NFL: 1
- All Stars: 1

Anthony Davis (born 29 November 1964), better known as Tony Davis, is an Irish former Gaelic football coach, retired player and former sports broadcaster. His league and championship career at senior level with the Cork county team spanned ten seasons from 1984 to 1994.

Born in Skibbereen, County Cork, Davis first played competitive Gaelic football at St Fachtna's De La Salle College. Here he won a Corn Uí Mhuirí medal in 1982, however, an All-Ireland medal remained elusive. He first appeared for the O'Donovan Rossa club at juvenile and underage levels, before winning a county under-21 championship medal in 1984. A county intermediate championship medal was won in 1985, before Davis won a county senior championship medal in 1992. This victory was followed by a Munster medal before Davis won an All-Ireland medal with the club in 1993, along with his brother Pat, who suffered a horrific injury in the semi-final against Lavey. At wing forward, Pat was the shining star on the club team. Pat later went on to captain the Cork team in a National League clash against Meath.

Davis made his debut on the inter-county scene at the age of sixteen when he was selected for the Cork minor team. He had two championship seasons with the minor team, culminating with the winning of an All-Ireland medal in 1981. Davis subsequently joined the Cork under-21 team, winning back-to-back All-Ireland medals in 1984 and 1985. He also won an All-Ireland medal with the junior team in 1984. By this stage Davis had also joined the Cork senior team, making his debut during the 1984-85 league. Over the course of the next ten years, he won back-to-back All-Ireland medals in 1989 and 1990. Davis also won seven Munster medals and one National Football League medal. He played his last game for Cork in August 1994. Towards the end of his career Davis was joined on the Cork team by his brother, Pat Davis and Don.

After being chosen on the Munster inter-provincial team for the first time in 1987, Davis was a regular on the starting fifteen for a number of years. During that time he lost four Railway Cup finals.

In retirement from playing Davis combined his policing career with a new position as a sports broadcaster and as a coach. His media career began with RTÉ in 1995, where he acted as a co-commentator and studio analyst with the flagship programme The Sunday Game. Davis stepped down from this position in 2013. During this time he also served as a coach with the Douglas team.

He no longer follows the game with the same enthusiasm, telling the Irish Examiner in 2020: "I watch quite a bit of football, but in fairness I wouldn't as au fait as I used to be with all the players on the Antrim and Carlow panels, for instance. The games I'd find interesting I watch — the likes of Dublin, Kerry, Galway, Donegal, and if Cork were playing at home I'd head to watch them".

== Career statistics ==
| Team | Season | Munster | | All-Ireland | | Total | |
| Team | Season | Apps | Score | Apps | Score | Apps | Score |
|---|---|---|---|---|---|---|---|
| Cork | 1985 | 1 | 0-00 | 0 | 0-00 | 1 | 0-00 |
| Cork | 1986 | 1 | 0-00 | 0 | 0-00 | 1 | 0-00 |
| Cork | 1987 | 3 | 0-02 | 3 | 0-00 | 6 | 0-02 |
| Cork | 1988 | 2 | 0-00 | 3 | 0-00 | 5 | 0-00 |
| Cork | 1989 | 2 | 0-00 | 2 | 0-00 | 4 | 0-00 |
| Cork | 1990 | 2 | 0-00 | 1 | 0-00 | 3 | 0-00 |
| Cork | 1991 | 1 | 0-00 | 0 | 0-00 | 1 | 0-00 |
| Cork | 1992 | 1 | 0-00 | 0 | 0-00 | 1 | 0-00 |
| Cork | 1993 | 3 | 0-00 | 2 | 0-01 | 5 | 0-01 |
| Cork | 1995 | 0 | 0-00 | 1 | 0-00 | 1 | 0-00 |
| Total | | 16 | 0-02 | 12 | 0-01 | 28 | 0-03 |

== Honours ==
St Fachtna's College

- Corn Uí Mhuirí (1): 1982

O'Donovan Rossa

- All-Ireland Senior Club Football Championship (1): 1993
- Munster Senior Club Football Championship (1): 1992
- Cork Senior Football Championship (1): 1992
- Cork Intermediate Football Championship (1): 1985

Cork

- All-Ireland Senior Football Championship (2): 1989, 1990
- Munster Senior Football Championship (7): 1987, 1988, 1989, 1990, 1993, 1994, 1995
- National Football League (1): 1988–89
- All-Ireland Junior Football Championship (1): 1984
- Munster Junior Football Championship (1): 1984
- All-Ireland Under-21 Football Championship (2): 1984, 1985 (c)
- Munster Under-21 Football Championship (2): 1984, 1985 (c)
- All-Ireland Minor Football Championship (1): 1981
- Munster Minor Football Championship (1): 1981

Achievements
| Preceded by Niall Cahalane | All-Ireland Under-21 Football Final winning captain 1985 | Succeeded by Mick Slocum |
