= Tony Nation =

Irish Gaelic footballer

Personal information
- Native name: Tónaí Ó Náisiúin (Irish)
- Born: 15 July 1963 (age 63) Cork, Ireland
- Occupation: Maintenance manager
- Height: 5 ft 10 in (178 cm)

Sport
- Sport: Gaelic football
- Position: Half-back
Club
- Years: Club
- Nemo Rangers
Club titles
- Cork titles: 4
- Munster titles: 4
- All-Ireland Titles: 3
Inter-county
| Years | County | Apps (scores) |
| 1984-1992 | Cork | 22 (0-6) |
Inter-county titles
- Munster titles: 4
- All-Irelands: 2
- NFL: 1
- All Stars: 0

Anthony Nation (born 15 July 1963) is an Irish retired Gaelic footballer. His league and championship career with the Cork senior team lasted nine years from 1984 to 1992.

== Career ==
Nation first played competitive Gaelic football at juvenile and underage levels with Nemo Rangers. After progressing onto the club's senior team, he enjoyed a hugely successful era and won All-Ireland medals in 1984, 1989 and 1994. Nation also won four Munster medals and four county senior championship medals.

Nation made his debut on the inter-county scene at the age of twenty when he was selected for the Cork minor team. He enjoyed two championship seasons with the under-21 team, culminating with the winning of an All-Ireland medal in 1984. By this stage he had also joined the Cork senior team, making his debut during the 1984 championship. Over the course of the next eight years, Nation won two All-Ireland medals as part of Cork's back-to-back successes in 1989 and 1990. He also won four successive Munster medals and one National Football League medal. He was selected for Cork for the last time in May 1992.

After being selected on the Munster inter-provincial team for the first time in 1991, Nation was an unused substitute throughout the championship and ended his career without a Railway Cup medal.

== Honours ==
Nemo Rangers

- All-Ireland Senior Club Football Championship: 1984, 1989, 1994, 2003
- Munster Senior Club Football Championship: 1983, 1987, 1988, 1993
- Cork Senior Football Championship: 1983, 1987, 1988, 1993

Cork

- All-Ireland Senior Football Championship (2): 1989, 1990
- Munster Senior Football Championship (4): 1987, 1988 (c), 1989, 1990
- National Football League (1): 1988-89
- All-Ireland Under-21 Football Championship (1): 1984
- Munster Under-21 Football Championship (1): 1984

Sporting positions
| Preceded by Conor Counihan | Cork Senior Football Captain; 1988 | Succeeded by Dinny Allen |
