= Patrick O'Donnell (Gaelic footballer) =

Northern Irish Gaelic footballer (1965–2024)

Personal information
- Native name: Pádraig Ó Domhnaill (Irish)
- Born: 1965 Feeny, Northern Ireland
- Died: 19 December 2024 (aged 59) Magherafelt, Northern Ireland

Sport
- Sport: Gaelic football
- Position: Full-back
Club
- Years: Club
- Banagher
Club titles
- Derry titles: 0
Inter-county
- Years: County
- 1990-1991: Derry
Inter-county titles
- Ulster titles: 0
- All-Irelands: 0
- NFL: 0
- All Stars: 0

Patrick O'Donnell (1965 – 19 December 2024) was a Northern Irish Gaelic football manager and player. At club level he played with Banagher and was also a member of the Derry senior football team.

O'Donnell played with Banagher and is regarded as one of the club's greatest ever players. He won several Dr Kerlin Cup titles throughout his career, as well as a Division 2 Football League title. At inter-county level, O'Donnell was part of the Derry team that won the All-Ireland MFC title in 1983. He won an Ulster U21FC medal in 1986 before making his senior team debut in 1991. O'Donnell also served as manager of the Derry ladies' Gaelic football team.

O'Donnell died on 19 December 2024, at the age of 59.

== Honours ==
Banagher

- Dr Kerlin Cup: 1984, 1995, 1996

Derry

- Ulster Under-21 Football Championship: 1986
- All-Ireland Minor Football Championship: 1983
- Ulster Minor Football Championship: 1983
