= Michael Fitzmaurice =

Michael Fitzmaurice may refer to:

- Michael Fitzmaurice (actor) (1908–1967), American actor
- Michael John Fitzmaurice (born 1950), American soldier
- Michael Fitzmaurice (politician) (born 1969), Irish politician
- Michael Fitzmaurice (Gaelic footballer) (born 1958), Irish Gaelic footballer
