= Niall Creedon =

Irish Gaelic footballer

Personal information
- Native name: Niall Ó Críodáin (Irish)
- Born: 1961 (age 64–65) Cork, Ireland
- Occupation: Biochemist

Sport
- Sport: Gaelic football
- Position: Full-back
Club
- Years: Club
- Nemo Rangers
Club titles
- Cork titles: 3
- Munster titles: 3
- All-Ireland Titles: 2
Inter-county
Years	County	Apps (scores)
1987–1989	Cork	1 (0-00)
Inter-county titles
- Munster titles: 2
- All-Irelands: 0
- NFL: 0
- All Stars: 0

Niall Creedon (born 1961) is an Irish former Gaelic footballer. His league and championship career with the Cork senior team spanned three seasons from 1987 to 1999.

Born in Cork, Creedon first played competitive Gaelic football at juvenile and underage levels with the Nemo Rangers club before eventually joining the senior team. In a lengthy career he won All-Ireland medals in 1989 and 1994. Creedon also won three Munster medals and three county senior championship medal.

Creedon made his debut on the inter-county scene at the age of seventeen when he was selected for the Cork minor team. He enjoyed one championship season with the minor team in 1979 but ended the year as a Munster runner-up. He subsequently joined the Cork under-21 team and won an All-Ireland medal in 1981. Creedon later joined the Cork senior team after being added to the panel in 1987. Over the course of three championship seasons he won two Munster medals as a non-playing substitute. He played his last game for Cork in June 1989.

== Honours ==
Nemo Rangers

- All-Ireland Senior Club Football Championship (2): 1989, 1994
- Munster Senior Club Football Championship (3): 1987, 1988, 1993
- Cork Senior Football Championship (3): 1987, 1988, 1993

Cork

- All-Ireland Senior Football Championship (1): 1989
- Munster Senior Football Championship (2): 1987, 1989
- All-Ireland Under-21 Football Championship (1): 1981
