= Two-legged tie =

Type of contest between two teams

In sports (especially association football), a two-legged tie is a contest between two teams that comprises two matches or "legs", with each team as the home team in one leg. The winning team is usually determined by aggregate score. For example, if the scores of the two legs are:

- First leg: Team A 1–0 Team B
- Second leg: Team B 3–3 Team A

then the aggregate score will be Team A 4–3 Team B, meaning team A wins the tie. In some competitions, a tie is considered to be drawn if each team wins one leg, regardless of the aggregate score. Two-legged ties can be used in knockout cup competitions and playoffs. In North America, the equivalent term is home-and-away series or, if decided by aggregate, two-game total-goals series.

== Use ==
In association football, two-legged ties are used in the later stages of many international club tournaments, including the UEFA Champions League and the Copa Libertadores; in many domestic cup competitions, including the Coppa Italia and the Copa del Rey; in domestic league play-offs, including the English Football League play-offs; and in national-team playoffs in some qualification tournaments, including FIFA World Cup qualification.

In ice hockey, the National Hockey League used two-game, total-goals series in the early years of its playoffs. It applied to all its playoffs from 1918 to 1926, and the early rounds until 1937, when it completed the switch to best-of-n series; Rendez-vous '87 (which pitted a team of NHL All-Stars against the Soviet Union) was the only two-legged tie to be held in the league's history after 1937. The NCAA Men's Ice Hockey Championship also used a two-game total goals format for much of its history. The Champions Hockey League has been using two-legged ties for its playoffs (except for the final) since its first season in 2015.

In rugby union, two-legged matches are used in the qualifying stages of the Rugby World Cup. The semifinals of the Italian National Championship of Excellence are also two-legged, as are the semifinals and final of England's second-tier league, the RFU Championship.

In basketball, the two top European club competitions, the Euroleague and Eurocup, both use two-legged ties in the qualifying rounds that determine the clubs advancing to each competition's group phase. The Eurocup also uses two-legged ties in its quarterfinal round, which will be a separate phase of the competition starting in 2009–10. The French Pro A league used two-legged ties in all of its playoff rounds, except for the one-off final, until the 2006–07 season. At that time, all of its playoff rounds leading up to the final, which remained a single match through 2011–12, were changed to best-of-three series. The final changed to best-of-five starting in 2012–13.

In Gaelic football, two-legged finals were used for five seasons of the National Football League, the last in 1988–89. The International Rules Series was also two-legged in 1998–2013 and from 2017 onward.

In Canadian football, two-legged total point series were occasionally used by the Canadian Football League and their predecessor leagues in the postseason, most recently in the 1986 playoffs.

In Arena football, the playoff semifinals (but not the Arena Bowl itself) are decided, as of the 2018 season, by a two-legged total points playoff. In one 2018 semifinal, the first game ended in a tie, and went to overtime. However, the winner of the second game won by a larger margin (within regulation time) and was awarded overall victory based on total aggregate points.

In volleyball, two-legged ties are used, for example, in the CEV Champions League. The team earning more points wins the tie. A win with 3–0 or 3–1 sets scores three points for the winner, a 3–2 gives two points for the winner, one for the loser. If both teams are equal on points after the second match, a single golden set is played immediately after the second match to determine the winner of the tie.

In handball, two-legged ties with aggreate scores are used in competitions like the EHF Champions League or the qualification to the World Men's and Women's Championships.

Outside of sports, the American game show Jeopardy! has used the two-legged tie in the final round of tournament play at some point in its history.

== Tiebreaking ==
If the aggregate score is tied after the two legs, various methods can be used to break ties. Under the away goals rule, the team who scored more away goals advances. If away goals are equal, or are not considered, then the tie may be decided by extra time and/or a penalty shootout. Replays, at the second-leg venue or a neutral venue, were formerly used in European club competitions. In the Liguilla (playoffs) of the Primera División de México, the team with the better regular-season record advances; some leagues take the two teams' record against one another into account. In the promotion playoffs in Italy's Serie B (which do not necessarily occur in a given season), two-legged ties that are level on aggregate at the end of regulation time of the second leg go to extra time (away goals are not used); if the tie remains level after extra time, the team that finished higher in the league table advances.

== Second leg home advantage ==
Each team hosts one match, and there is no intended advantage to whether a team plays at home first or second. However, many managers and players believe that the team playing at home for the second leg has a slight advantage. The thinking is that the team playing away for the first leg can play it safe there (a draw or even a slight defeat is considered a favorable result), and then "win" the tie at home in the second leg (even away goals rule). Additionally, hosting the second match also gives an advantage as the hosting team may get to play extra-time or a penalty shootout in their home stadium if a tiebreak was needed.

A statistical analysis of roughly 12,000 matches from the European club competitions between 1956 and 2007 showed that around 53% of teams playing at home in the second leg won the tie (even after allowing for the fact that team playing at home in the second leg tend to be better teams).

In the case of World Cup intercontinental playoffs, the team that plays the second leg at home has won 61% of ties.

=== UEFA Club Competitions ===
In the UEFA Club Competitions, two-legged ties regularly involve seeded and unseeded teams, and the seeded team are (typically, see below) scheduled to play at home in the second leg, due to the long standing assumption that this order is an advantage to the seeded team. As of the 2024/25 season in the UEFA Champions League, UEFA Europa League and UEFA Conference League, the top eight teams in the League Phase (First Round Proper) are given a bye to the Round of 16, whilst each one of the teams in positions 9-16 plays one of the teams in positions 17-24 in the Knockout Round Playoffs (Round of 24) over two legs, where the higher placed team plays the second game at home, following the idea that this is theoretically an advantage to the higher finishing team, thereby rewarding them. Those who win progress to the Round of 16, where they each play one of the top eight, and the top eight team plays the second game at home.

For the 2024/25 season only, the home-away order of each tie in the Quarter Finals and Semi Finals was decided by random draw simultaneously with the final bracket at the Round of 16 draws in the respective competitions, in an explicit separate draw. However this was very controversial with many fans, due to the belief that higher finishing teams had earned their "second leg home advantage" later in the competition. In response, as of the 2025/26 season, the home-away order of each future tie is fixed in the bracket before any draws, under the guiding principle that the top four finishing League Phase teams should play the second leg of the Quarter Finals at home, and the top two finishing teams should play the second leg of the Semi Finals at home.

The now defunct Group Stage format also included this embedded belief that the second leg at home was an advantage for a team. As such, between 2021/22 and 2023/24, the Champions League Round of 16 had the group winners play the second leg at home against the group runners-up. In the Europa and Conference Leagues (known during this period as the Europa Conference League) the group runners-up play the second leg at home against the higher competition's third-place team from the Group Stage (First Round Proper) in the Knockout Round Playoffs, while in the Round of 16, the group winners played the second leg at home against these Knockout Round Playoff winners. Between the 2009/10 and 2020/21 seasons the Europa League format was similar (the Conference League's first edition was in the 2021/22 season), although both first and second placed teams proceeded to the Round of 32, with the former teams seeded and the latter teams unseeded. The Champions League third placed teams were either seeded or unseeded, such that the "best" (by points, goal difference etc.) four third-place finishers were seeded, and the others unseeded. Each of each of the seeded teams were drawn against one of the unseeded teams. The seeded teams played second game at home and the unseeded teams played the first game at home. Before the 2024/25 season, all Quarter Finals and Semi Final ties had their order decided by random draw (by virtue of the second team drawn in a tie due to play at home second), and the Round of 16 in the Europa League was also done this way before 2021/22.

Seeding also takes place in qualifying rounds for the competition, which work on similar two legged formats. Here seeding is largely carried out by UEFA coefficient points of a team in a pair (or more) of teams. However this has not always been a format where the seeded teams play the second game at home.

Officially no two teams in the same city (teams within 50km of each other) can play at home on the same night or consecutive nights, according to the Regulations of the Champions League, Europa League and Conference League sections 24.02-24.03. This phenomenon is known as a city clash. This is for policing and crowd control reasons. However this rule (especially the "consecutive nights" part) is often not strictly adhered to and can occasionally be negotiated on a case by case basis. In cases where ties were decided by random draw, often the order of one tie was reversed (usually that of the "weaker team" by some metric). If however teams have their home-away order dictated by seeding (e.g., a certain League Phase finish) there are procedures which attempt to keep this order intact, such as moving games to different days (usually Europa and Conference League games to Wednesday; Champions League games are usually only played on Thursdays in an emergency, excluding the first Thursday of the European season proper as of 2024/25) or by the finding of alternative home venues. However, there is a mechanism by which a team can voluntarily reverse the order of their tie should they wish, and have been cases where this has been done before.

=== Copa Brasil ===
Until the 2016 edition of the Copa do Brasil, in the first two rounds, which were played as two-legged ties, if the away team won the first leg by two or more goals, they would progress straight to the next round without needing to play the second leg which they would play at home. However, the second leg would still have to be played if the home team won the first leg by two or more goals.

== Alternatives ==
In knockout competitions, alternatives to two-legged ties include:

- single-leg ties,
  - either where one team has home advantage, as in all rounds of the FA Cup except the semi-finals and finals. When a replay is necessary, it may be played at the home ground of the opposite team. Two-legged ties are seen as fairer, since they give neither team home advantage; conversely, in the National Football League, home advantage is a reward for being the better seed or, in the opening wild-card round, winning the division.
  - or played at a neutral venue, as in the final match of many tournaments, including the UEFA Champions League Final, the FA Cup Semi-finals and Final, and the NFL's Super Bowl. Neutral venues may be inconvenient for a team's fans to travel to, and due to this and the much higher prices for such a marquee event, a championship at a neutral site often draws a crowd of a much different nature than a crowd at a regular season contest. If the venue is picked before the teams playing are known, it is possible for the team that normally plays at the neutral venue to reach the match: an example is the 1984 European Cup Final where Liverpool F.C. played A.S. Roma at the Stadio Olimpico, Roma's home ground (despite this, Roma had been drawn as the technical away team for this match).
- best-of-n series, where the team winning more matches wins the series. These are common in major Canadian and American sports leagues; games cannot be drawn and series are typically best of 3, 5 or 7, though 9-game series are sometimes used. Such series are typically structured with alternating home venues so that the higher-ranked team gets the extra game (if necessary).
