= 1958 Cork Junior Football Championship =

Irish hurling competition

- Champions: Glanmire (3rd title)
- Runners-up: Mitchelstown

The 1958 Cork Junior Football Championship was the 60th staging of the Cork Junior Football Championship since its establishment by the Cork County Board in 1895.

The final was played on 7 December 1958 at Fitzgerald Park in Fermoy, between Glanmire and Mitchelstown, in what was their first ever meeting in the final. Glanmire won the match by 2–07 to 2–05 to claim their third championship title overall and a first championship title in seven years.

== Results ==
=== Final ===
7 December 1958 Final	Glanmire	2–07 – 2–05	Mitchelstown	Fitzgerald Park
