= 1996 Cork Senior Football Championship =

Gaelic football competition

- Dates: 27 April 1996 – 20 October 1996
- Teams: 24
- Sponsor: TSB Bank
- Champions: Clonakilty (8th title); Brian Murphy (captain); Michael O'Donovan (manager)
- Runners-up: University College Cork; Séamus Moynihan (captain); Des Cullinane (manager)

Tournament statistics
- Matches played: 24
- Goals scored: 41 (1.71 per match)
- Points scored: 468 (19.5 per match)
- Top scorer(s): Colin Corkery (0-21)

The 1996 Cork Senior Football Championship was the 108th staging of the Cork Senior Football Championship since its establishment by the Cork County Board in 1887. The draw for the opening fixtures took place on 10 December 1995. The championship began on 27 April 1996 and ended on 20 October 1996.

Bantry Blues entered the championship as the defending champions, however, they were defeated by Beara at the quarter-final stage.

On 20 October 1996, Clonakilty won the championship following a 1–09 to 0–10 defeat of University College Cork in the final. This was their 8th championship title overall and their first title since 1952.

Colin Corkery from the Nemo Rangers club was the championship's top scorer with 0-21.

== Team changes ==
=== To Championship ===
Promoted from the Cork Intermediate Football Championship

- Dohenys

== Results ==
=== First round ===
27 April 1996 First round	Carbery	1-06 - 0-12	St. Finbarr's	Macroom
	P Hegarty 1-1, C Cronin 0-2, K Ryan 0-1, M Cronin 0-1, B Harte 0-1.		I O'Mahony 0-3, B O'Shea 0-2, P O'Keeffe 0-2, I Kelleher 0-2, M Comyns 0-1, F Murray 0-1, B Hurley 0-1.	Referee: R Murphy

27 April 1996 First round	Glanmire	1-08 - 0-06	Carrigdhoun	Páirc Uí Rinn, Cork
	T McCarthy 1-0, J Crowley 0-3, B O'Callaghan 0-2, B Lotty 0-2, P Ryan 0-1.		M Hickey 0-2, A Crowley 0-2, M Kelleher 0-1, J Mullaney 0-1, C O'Donovan 0-1.	Referee: J Kearney (Na Piarsaigh)

28 April 1996 First round	Na Piarsaigh	2-10 - 1-09	Cork Regional Technical College	Páirc Uí Chaoimh, Cork
	G Daly 1-2, Mickey Mullins 0-5, G Casey 1-1, Mark Mullins 0-1, G Fitzgerald 0-1.		J O'Connell 0-4, JD Murphy 1-0, M Moore 0-3, F Cunningham 0-1, C O'Shea 0-1.	Referee: D Linehan

28 April 1996 First round	Bishopstown	1-09 - 1-12	Ballincollig	Páirc Uí Chaoimh, Cork
	L Meaney 1-0, P McGrath 0-3, P Cahill 0-3, D O'Mahony 0-1, J Honohan 0-1, L Honohan 0-1.		P O'Mahony 0-7, F Keohane 1-1, D Kelly 0-2, D Hegarty 0-1, A Beale 0-1.	Referee: N Barrett

28 April 1996 First round	Seandún	1-03 - 0-07	Clonakilty	Charlie Hurley Park, Bandon
	D O'Connell 1-1, J Canniffe 0-1, P McCarthy 0-1.		M Naughton 0-5, B Crowley 0-1, T Mannix 0-1.	Referee: R O'Sullivan (Kilmurry)

5 May 1996 First round	Dohenys	1-07 - 1-10	Aghada	Ballincollig
	S Mohan 1-1, C Crowley 0-3, B Herlihy 0-1, F Collins 0-1, T Buckley 0-1.		R Lewis 1-4, M Lewis 0-3, D Creedon 0-1, O O'Neill 0-1, A Devoy 0-1.	Referee: S O'Keeffe

18 May 1996 First round	O'Donovan Rossa	1-18 - 0-12	St. Nicholas'	Charlie Hurley Park, Bandon
	N Murphy 1-7, J O'Driscoll 0-4, N McCarthy 0-2, D Davis 0-2, M McCarthy 0-1, B O'Donovan 0-1, T Davis 0-1.		B McSweeney 0-7, B O'Connell 0-2, K O'Callaghan 0-1, T Murphy 0-1, N Byrnes 0-1.	Referee: G Harrington (Carrigaline)

19 May 1996 First round	Castlehaven	1-12 - 1-07	Imokilly	Páirc Uí Rinn, Cork
	J McGuire 1-2, F Cahalane 0-2, E Cleary 0-2, B Deasy 0-2, J Cleary 0-2, D Cahalane 0-1, A Crowley 0-1.		D Barrett 1-1, JJ Kearney 0-3, J Morgan 0-2, M Spillane 0-1.	Referee: S O'Keeffe (Blackrock)

=== Second round ===
19 May 1996 Second round	Muskerry	0-11 - 0-11	St. Finbarr's	Innishannon
	J McCarthy 0-5, P Concannon 0-2, A Dorgan 0-2, J O'Leary 0-1, D Kelleher 0-1.		I O'Mahony 0-3, P O'Keeffe 0-3, B O'Shea 0-2, I Keeler 0-1, K Kelleher 0-1, E Barrett 0-1.	Referee: J Cummins

19 May 1996 Second round	Duhallow	0-08 - 0-05	Avondhu	Fr. Con Buckley Park, Buttevant
	D O'Sullivan 0-4, N O'Connor 0-2, J Herlihy 0-1, D Culloty 0-1.		R Walsh 0-1, C O'Sullivan 0-1, C Cronin 0-1, W O'Riordan 0-1, D Walsh 0-1.	Referee: J O'Leary (Na Piarsaigh)

19 May 1996 Second round	Ballincollig	1-09 - 2-08	Clonakilty	Páirc Naomh Eoin
	F Keohane 1-2, P O'Mahony 0-4, J Kelleher 0-2, A Beale 0-1.		B Walsh 1-1, E O'Mahony 0-4, M O'Donovan 1-0, T Mannix 0-1, B Walsh 0-1, T Dillon 0-1.

19 May 1996 Second round	Aghada	1-07 - 0-13	Beara	Macroom
	C Counihan 1-1, M Lewis 0-4, D Devoy 0-1, R Lewis 0-1.		S Spencer 0-4, DJ O'Sullivan 0-2, D Healy 0-2, N Murphy 0-2, M Harrington 0-2, M O'Sullivan 0-1.	Referee: R O'Sullivan (Kilmurry)

19 May 1996 Second round	University College Cork	6-16 - 2-11	Glanmire	Church Road, Blackrock
	J Buckley 1-5, J Crowley 1-2, D Meade 1-2, J Whooley 1-2, C O'Dwyer 1-0, T Stack 1-0, M Cronin 0-3, E Fitzgerald 0-2.		J Crowley 0-5, T McCarthy 1-0, C O'Leary 1-0, B O'Callaghan 0-2, T Óg Lynch 0-1, P O'Callaghan 0-1, K Grandon 0-1, B Lotty 0-1.

2 June 1996 Second round	Bantry Blues	0-13 - 1-08	Na Piarsaigh	Sam Maguire Park, Dunmanway
	K Harrington 0-7, S McCarthy 0-5, A O'Shea 0-1.		Mickey Mullins 0-4, G Daly 1-0, D Sheehan 0-3, Mark Mullins 0-1.

8 June 1996 Second round	Nemo Rangers	0-15 - 1-09	Mallow	Carrignavar
	C Corkery 0-9, P Lambert 0-4, N Corkery 0-1, P O'Donovan 0-1.		R Sheehan 0-5, T O'Riordan 1-0, A Aherne 0-3, M O'Donovan 0-1.	Referee: N Barrett (Carrigtwohill)

9 June 1996 Second round	O'Donovan Rossa	0-09 - 0-07	Castlehaven	Sam Maguire Park, Dunmanway
	N Murphy 0-6, N McCarthy 0-1, D Davis 0-1, J O'Driscoll 0-1.		J Cleary 0-5, B Deasy 0-2.	Referee: N Barrett (Carrigtwohill)

4 August 1996 Second round replay	Muskerry	2-07 - 1-13	St. Finbarr's	Innishannon
	N Twomey 2-0, J McCarthy 0-3, SF Cronin 0-3, G McPolin 0-1.		F Murray 0-6, B O'Shea 1-0, P O'Keeffe 0-3, J O'Donoghue 0-1, M Comyns 0-1, B Hurley 0-1, L O'Mahony 0-1.	Referee: J Cummins (Glanworth)

=== Quarter-finals ===
28 July 1996 Quarter-final	Clonakilty	2-08 - 1-07	Duhallow	Coachford Sportsfield, Coachford
	E O'Mahony 0-6, K Meade 1-0, T Mannix 1-0, T Dillon 0-1, B Walsh 0-1.		J Herlihy 1-2, D Culloty 0-4, J Sheehan 0-1.	Referee: J Cummins (Glanworth)

28 July 1996 Quarter-final	Beara	0-12 - 1-04	Bantry Blues	Kealkill
	M Buckley 0-3, C O'Sullivan 0-3, M Harrington 0-2, A O'Regan 0-2, S Spencer 0-1, PB O'Sullivan 0-1.		K Harrington 1-2, E Sheehan 0-1.

4 August 1996 Quarter-final	University College Cork	2-14 - 0-17	Nemo Rangers	Páirc Uí Rinn, Cork
	M Cronin 2-1, M O'Sullivan 0-5, J Buckley 0-4, J Whooley 0-2, D Meade 0-1, J Clifford 0-1.		C Corkery 0-12, J Kavanagh 0-3, M Cronin 0-1, S Fahy 0-1.	Referee: N Barrett (Carrigtwohill)

17 August 1996 Quarter-final	St. Finbarr's	1-09 - 0-08	O'Donovan Rossa	Clonakilty Sportsfield, Clonakilty
	F Murray 1-3, I O'Mahony 0-3, M Comyns 0-2, B O'Shea 0-1.		N Murphy 0-4, M McCarthy 0-1, D O'Driscoll 0-1, J O'Driscoll 0-1, M Twomey 0-1.	Referee: S O'Keeffe

=== Semi-finals ===
25 August 1996 Semi-final	University College Cork	1-13 - 1-12	Beara	Wolfe Tone Park, Bantry
	M Cronin 1-1, J Whooley 0-4, M O'Sullivan 0-3, J Crowley 0-2, J Clifford 0-2, F lohan 0-1.		C O'Sullivan 1-6, M Harrington 0-2, Spencer 0-2, D Healy 0-2.	Referee: M Collins (Clonakilty)

21 September 1996 Semi-final	Clonakilty	1-08 - 0-09	St. Finbarr's	Charlie Hurley Park, Bandon
	Pádraig Griffin 1-1, E O'Mahony 0-3, B Walsh 0-2, T Dillon 0-2.		J O'Donoghue 0-2, B O'Shea 0-2, E Barrett 0-1, I O'Mahony 0-1, K Kelleher 0-1, F Murray 0-1, M Desmond 0-1.

=== Final ===
20 October 1996 Final	Clonakilty	1-09 - 0-10	University College Cork	Páirc Uí Chaoimh, Cork
	T Dillon 1-2, E O'Mahony 0-3, Pat Griffin 0-2, T Mannix 0-1, K Meade 0-1.		J Crowley 0-4, K O'Dwyer 0-3, M O'Sullivan 0-2, J Clifford 0-1.	Referee: J Cummins (Glanworth)

== Championship statistics ==
=== Top scorers ===
Overall

Rank	Player	Club	Tally	Total	Matches	Average
1	Colin Corkery	Nemo Rangers	0-21	21	2	10.50
2	Neville Murphy	O'Donovan Rossa	1-17	20	2	10.00
3	Eoin O'Mahony	Clonakilty	0-16	16	5	3.20
4	Mícheál Ó Cróinín	UCC	3-05	14	4	3.50
4	Fionán Murray	St. Finbarr's	1-11	14	5	2.80
6	Ciarán O'Sullivan	Beara	1-09	12	3	4.00
6	Kevin Harrington	Bantry Blues	1-09	12	2	6.00
6	John Buckley	UCC	1-09	12	4	3.00
9	Jason Whooley	UCC	1-08	11	4	2.75
9	Johnny Crowley	UCC	1-08	11	4	2.75
9	Podsie O'Mahony	Ballincollig	0-11	11	2	5.50

In a single game

Rank	Player	Club	Tally	Total	Opposition
1	Colin Corkery	Nemo Rangers	0-12	12	UCC
2	Neville Murphy	O'Donovan Rossa	1-07	10	St. Nicholas'
3	Ciarán O'Sullivan	Beara	1-06	9	UCC
3	Colin Corkery	Nemo Rangers	0-09	9	Mallow
5	John Buckley	UCC	1-05	8	Glanmire
6	Mícheál Ó Cróinín	UCC	2-01	7	Nemo Rangers
6	Richie Lewis	Aghada	1-04	7	Dohenys
6	Podsie O'Mahony	Ballincollig	0-07	7	Bishopstown
6	Brian McSweeney	St. Nicholas'	0-07	7	O'Donovan Rossa
6	Kevin Harrington	Bantry Blues	0-07	7	Na Piarsaigh

=== Miscellaneous ===
- Clonakilty win the title for the first time since 1952.
- University College Cork qualify for the final for the first time since 1980.
