= Don Davis (Gaelic footballer) =

Cork Gaelic footballer

Personal information
- Native name: Dónall Dáibhís (Irish)
- Born: 13 March 1969 (age 57) Skibbereen, County Cork, Ireland
- Occupation: Garda Síochána
- Height: 5 ft 10 in (178 cm)

Sport
- Sport: Gaelic football
- Position: Full-forward
Club
- Years: Club
- O'Donovan Rossa
Club titles
- Cork titles: 1
- Munster titles: 1
- All-Ireland Titles: 1
Inter-county*
Years	County	Apps (scores)
1993–2000	Cork	23 (1–11)
Inter-county titles
- Munster titles: 4
- All-Irelands: 0
- NFL: 1
- All Stars: 0
- *Inter County team apps and scores correct as of 13:52, 9 March 2014.

Don Davis (born 13 March 1969) is an Irish former Gaelic footballer who played as a full-forward for the Cork senior team.

Born in Skibbereen, County Cork, Davis first played competitive Gaelic football whilst at school at St Fachtna's De La Salle Secondary School. He arrived on the inter-county scene at the age of seventeen when he first linked up with the Cork minor team, before later lining out with the under-21 side. He made his senior debut in the 1993 championship. Davis went on to play a key role for the team over the next seven years, winning four Munster medals and one National Football League medal. He was an All-Ireland SFC runner-up on two occasions.

Davis was a member of the Munster inter-provincial team on one occasion; however, he ended his career without a Railway Cup medal. At club level he won an All-Ireland Club SFC medal with O'Donovan Rossa, alongside his brother Tony and Pat, who suffered a horrible injury in the semi-final against Lavey. Don also won a Munster Club SFC and a Cork SFC medal.

His brother Tony won two All-Ireland SFC medals with Cork, while his brother Pat captained Cork in a National League clash against Kildare.

Throughout his career Davis made 23 championship appearances for Cork. He retired from inter-county football following the conclusion of the 2000 championship.

Davis is often noted as one of Cork's greatest-ever Gaelic footballers. He is regularly voted onto teams made up of the sport's greats, including at centre-forward on a special Cork team made up of players never to have won an All-Ireland medal.

In retirement from play Davis became involved in coaching and team management. In 2013, he was named as a selector as part of Brian Cuthbert's management team for the Cork senior footballers.

== Honours ==
=== Playing honours ===
O'Donovan Rossa

- All-Ireland Senior Club Football Championship (1): 1993
- Munster Senior Club Football Championship (1): 1992
- Cork Senior Football Championship (1): 1992

Cork

- Munster Senior Football Championship (4): 1993, 1994, 1995, 1999
- National Football League (1): 1999
- All-Ireland Under-21 Football Championship (1): 1989
- Munster Under-21 Football Championship (1): 1989
- Munster Minor Football Championship (1): 1987
