= 1989 All-Ireland Under-21 Football Championship =

Gaelic football competition

Championship details

All-Ireland Champions
- Winning team: Cork (8th win)
- Captain: Steven O'Brien

All-Ireland Finalists
- Losing team: Galway

Provincial Champions
- Munster: Cork
- Leinster: Meath
- Ulster: Antrim
- Connacht: Galway

The 1989 All-Ireland Under-21 Football Championship was the 26th staging of the All-Ireland Under-21 Football Championship since its establishment by the Gaelic Athletic Association in 1964.

Offaly entered the championship as defending champions, however, they were defeated by Kildare in a replay of the Leinster semi-final.

On 21 May 1989, Cork won the championship following a 2-8 to 1-10 defeat of Galway in the All-Ireland final. This was their eighth All-Ireland title overall and their first in three championship seasons.

== All-Ireland Under-21 Football Championship ==
=== All-Ireland final ===
21 May 1989 Final	Cork	2-08 - 1-10	Galway	Gaelic Grounds, Limerick
