= 1987 Cork Intermediate Football Championship =

Gaelic football competition

- Dates: 3 May - 1 November 1987
- Teams: 17
- Champions: Glanmire (1st title); Teddy McCarthy (captain)
- Runners-up: Fermoy; Denis Twomey (captain)

Tournament statistics
- Matches played: 19
- Goals scored: 43 (2.26 per match)
- Points scored: 280 (14.74 per match)
- Top scorer(s): Alan Copps (2-13)

The 1987 Cork Intermediate Football Championship was the 52nd staging of the Cork Intermediate Football Championship since its establishment by the Cork County Board in 1909. The draw for the opening round fixtures took place on 21 December 1986.

The final was played on 1 November 1987 at Bride Rovers Park, between Glanmire and Fermoy, in what was their first ever final meeting. Glanmire won the match by 3–05 to 0–06 to claim their first ever championship title.

Mallow's Alan Copps was the championship's top scorer with 2–13.

== Results ==
=== First round ===
3 May 1987 First round	Bishopstown	2-03 - 2-13	Doneraile	Coachford GAA Grounds
	R Shields 1-1, N Carroll 1-0, M Lyons 0-1, C Coffey 0-1.		D Cahill 1-3, P Nelligan 0-5, N Landy 1-0, K Stack 0-3, B Stack 0-1, P Harrington 0-1.

=== Second round ===
3 May 1987 Second round	Donoughmore	2-07 - 4-08	Glanmire	Blarney GAA Grounds
	D Moran 2-0, G O'Rourke 0-5, J O'Sullivan 0-2.		T McCarthy 1-2, T Murphy 1-1, J Barry 1-1, S O'Farrell 1-0, B Lotty 0-3, L Hedderman 0-1.

16 May 1987 Second round	Fermoy	0-08 - 0-04	Kilshannig	Castletownroche GAA Grounds
	W Frawley 0-2, M Dolan 0-2, D Pyne 0-2, F O'Groarke 0-2.		P O'Connell 0-2, W O'Riordan 0-1, P Corbett 0-1.

17 May 1987 Second round	Doneraile	2-08 - 1-11	Ballincollig	Mallow GAA Grounds
	P Nelligan 1-2, T Cahill 1-0, P Harrington 0-3, Mannix 0-1, K Stack 0-1, B Stack 0-1.		D Murphy 0-8, JJ Murphy 1-2, G Ring 0-1.

17 May 1987 Second round	Douglas	0-06 - 3-06	Dohenys	Páirc Naomh Eoin
	Larkin 0-2, J Murphy 0-2, E Forde 0-1, F Bermingham 0-1.		D Herlihy 1-1, K Farr 1-1, S Mohan 1-0, T Ross 0-1, H Ross 0-1, I Kingston 0-1, B Herlihy 0-1.

17 May 1987 Second round	Nemo Rangers	1-10 - 1-10	Knocknagree	O'Connell Park
	C Murphy 1-0, D Bevan 0-2, C Whelan 0-2, B Sheehan 0-1, D Daly 0-1, M Lynch 0-1, D Murphy 0-1, D Galvin 0-1, J Noone 0-1.		Niall O'Connor 0-5, D Kelleher 1-1, D O'Connor 0-2, F O'Connor 0-1, Noel O'Connor 0-1.

17 May 1987 Second round	Macroom	0-08 - 2-08	Mallow	Dromtarriffe GAA Grounds
	T Kelleher 0-4, J Neville 0-3, C Corrigan 0-1.		P Healy 1-0, N Lehane 1-0, R Sheehan 0-3, A Copps 0-3, S Browne 0-1, D Murphy 0-1.

17 May 1987 Second round	Kilmurry	1-11 - 1-08	Mayfield	Éire Óg Grounds
	G Lenihan 1-1, S Murphy 0-3, D O'Sullivan 0-2, M Kelleher 0-2, T Fitzgerald 0-1, M O'Neill 0-1, C Barry-Murphy 0-1.		D Crowley 0-4, S Lucey 1-0, F Mulvihill 0-2, J Coomey 0-1, P Byrnes 0-1.

17 May 1987 Second round	Bantry Blues	1-06 - 0-05	St. Finbarr's	Rosscarbery GAA Grounds
	P O'Driscoll 1-3, J Cotter 0-1, M Edgeworth 0-1, N Crowley 0-1.		J Keating 0-4, R Kenny 0-1.

23 May 1987 Second round replay	Nemo Rangers	2-09 - 1-06	Knocknagree	Donoughmore GAA Grounds
	C Murphy 1-1, D Bevan 1-1, C Whelan 0-4, M Lynch 0-2, M Dorgan 0-1.		F O'Connor 1-2, Niall O'Connor 0-3, D Kelleher 0-1.

24 May 1987 Second round replay	Doneraile	1-10 - 1-08	Ballincollig	Mallow GAA Grounds
	P Harrington 0-6, J Landy 1-0, K Stack 0-1, J Cusack 0-1, T Mannix 0-1, P Nelligan 0-1.		D Murphy 0-8, J Lucey 1-0.

=== Quarter-finals ===
4 July 1987 Quarter-final	Glanmire	1-10 - 1-06	Doneraile	Mitchelstown GAA Grounds
	B Lotty 1-2, T McCarthy 0-4, L Hedderman 0-2, D Kenneally 0-1, B Óg Murphy 0-1.		J Landy 1-2, P Harrington 0-4.

5 July 1987 Quarter-final	Nemo Rangers	0-08 - 0-05	Dohenys	Innishannon Grounds
	M Dorgan 0-4, S Calnan 0-4.		C Noonan 0-2, T Ross 0-1, H Ross 0-1, T Kearney 0-1.

11 July 1987 Quarter-final	Fermoy	2-11 - 1-08	Bantry Blues	Castle Grounds
	R Connolly 2-2, W Frawley 0-3, D Pyne 0-2, M Dolan 0-2, M Pyne 0-1, W Morrison 0-1.		P O'Driscoll 1-3, J Cotter 0-2, M O'Connor 0-1, G Lynch 0-1, GD Barry 0-1.

11 July 1987 Quarter-final	Mallow	2-06 - 0-12	Kilmurry	Delaney Rovers Grounds
	A Copps 1-3, E Lehane 1-0, S Browne 0-1, R Sheehan 0-1, P Buckley 0-1.		Martin Kelleher 0-6, G Lally 0-3, G Lenihan 0-1, D O'Sullivan 0-1, S Murphy 0-1.

23 August 1987 Quarter-final replay	Mallow	2-06 - 1-07	Kilmurry	Tank Field
	A Copps 1-4, D Buckley 1-0, P Buckley 0-1, P O'Sullivan 0-1.		M O'Neill 1-1, S Murphy 0-3, M Kelleher 0-1, D O'Sullivan 0-1, C Barry-Murphy 0-1.

=== Semi-finals ===
30 August 1987 Semi-final	Fermoy	1-10 - 0-06	Mallow	Castletownroche GAA Grounds
	D Pyne 0-4, M Dolan 1-0, P Donnellan 0-3, W Frawley 0-1, F Groarke 0-1, M Pyne 0-1.		A Copps 0-3, R Sheehan 0-1, D Murphy 0-1, P O'Sullivan 0-1.

24 October 1987 Semi-final	Glanmire	1-07 - 0-06	Nemo Rangers	Mayfield GAA Grounds
	B Lotty 1-1, T McCarthy 0-2, B Óg Murphy 0-2, P O'Callaghan 0-1, L Hedderman 0-1.		C Murphy 0-3, S Calnan 0-2, D Daly 0-1.

=== Final ===
1 November 1987 Final	Glanmire	3-05 - 0-06	Fermoy	Bride Rovers Park
	L Hedderman 2-0, T Murphy 1-1, D Kenneally 0-2, B Óg Murphy 0-1, T McCarthy 0-1.		D Pyne 0-2, M Dolan 0-1, M Pyne 0-1, S Dennehy 0-1, P Donnellan 0-1.	Referee: R Murphy

== Championship statistics ==
=== Top scorers ===
Top scorers overall

Rank	Player	Club	Tally	Total	Matches	Average
1	Alan Copps	Mallow	2-13	19	4	4.75
2	Denis Murphy	Ballincollig	0-16	16	2	8.00
3	Paddy Harrington	Doneraile	0-14	14	4	3.50
4	Pat O'Driscoll	Bantry Blues	2-06	12	2	6.00
4	Brian Lotty	Glanmire	2-06	12	4	3.00
4	Teddy McCarthy	Glanmire	1-09	12	4	3.00
7	Paul Neligan	Doneraile	2-06	11	4	2.75
8	Charlie Murphy	Nemo Rangers	2-04	10	3	3.33
8	Liam Hedderman	Glanmire	2-04	10	4	2.50
8	Davy Pyne	Fermoy	0-10	10	4	2.50

Top scorers in a single game

Rank	Player	Club	Tally	Total	Opposition
1	Ray Connolly	Fermoy	2-02	8	Bantry Blues
1	Denis Murphy	Ballincollig	0-08	8	Doneraile
1	Denis Murphy	Ballincollig	0-08	8	Doneraile
4	Alan Copps	Mallow	1-04	7	Bantry Blues
5	Denis Moran	Donoughmore	2-00	6	Glanmire
5	Liam Hedderman	Glanmire	2-00	6	Fermoy
5	Declan Cahill	Doneraile	1-03	6	Bishopstown
5	Pat O'Driscoll	Bantry Blues	1-03	6	St. Finbarr's
5	Pat O'Driscoll	Bantry Blues	1-03	6	Fermoy
5	Alan Copps	Mallow	1-03	6	Kilmurry
5	Paddy Harrington	Doneraile	0-06	6	Ballincollig
5	Martin Kelleher	Kilmurry	0-06	6	Mallow
