= 1982 All-Ireland Minor Football Championship =

Gaelic football competition

Championship details

All-Ireland Champions
- Winning team: Dublin (9th win)

All-Ireland Finalists
- Losing team: Kerry

Provincial Champions
- Munster: Kerry
- Leinster: Dublin
- Ulster: Antrim
- Connacht: Galway

The 1982 All-Ireland Minor Football Championship was the 51st staging of the All-Ireland Minor Football Championship, the Gaelic Athletic Association's premier inter-county Gaelic football tournament for boys under the age of 18.

Cork entered the championship as defending champions, however, they were defeated by Kerry in the Munster final.

On 19 September 1982, Dublin won the championship following a 1–11 to 1–5 defeat of Kerry in the All-Ireland final. This was their ninth All-Ireland title overall and their first in three championship seasons.

== Results ==
=== Connacht Minor Football Championship ===
Quarter-Final

| 16 May 1982 Quaater-Final | Leitrim | 2-5 - 1-5 | Mayo | Claremorris |
| | | | | Referee: M. Fahy (Roscommon) |

Semi-finals

| 27 June 1982 Semi-Final | Sligo | 1-8 - 1-10 | Roscommon | Corran Park, Ballymote |
| | | | | Referee: S. Prior (Leitrim) |

| 27 June 1982 Semi-Final | Galway | 0-8 - 0-8 | Roscommon | Dr Hyde Park, Roscommon |
| | | | | Referee: T. McNicolas (Mayo) |

| 4 July 1982 Semi-Final Replay | Galway | 1-7 - 0-7 | Roscommon | St Jarlath's Park, Tuam |
| | | | | Referee: T. McNicolas (Mayo) |

Final

| 11 July 1982 Final | Galway | 1-7 - 0-7 | Leitrim | St Jarlath's Park, Tuam |
| | | | | Referee: T. McNicolas (Mayo) |

=== Leinster Minor Football Championship ===
Preliminary Round

| 1982 Preliminary Round | Kildare | 1-17 - 1-4 | Kilkenny | Nowlan Park, Kilkenny |

| 1982 Preliminary Round | Louth | 1-5 - 0-5 | Carlow | Croke Park, Dublin |

| 1982 Preliminary Round | Meath | 2-16 - 4-4 | Longford | O'Connor Park, Tullamore |

| 1982 Preliminary Round | Westmeath | 3-6 - 0-13 | Wicklow | St Conleth's Park, Newbridge |

Quarter-Finals

| 1982 Quarter-Final | Louth | 2-7 - 2-2 | Offaly | Páirc Tailteann, Navan |

| 1982 Quarter-Final | Laois | 1-4 - 1-13 | Westmeath | O'Connor Park, Tullamore |

| 1982 Quarter-Final | Dublin | 0-10 - 0-5 | Meath | Parnell Park, Dublin |

| 1982 Quarter-Final | Kildare | 1-5 - 2-5 | Wexford | Geraldine Park, Athy |

Semi-Finals

| 1982 Semi-Final | Westmeath | 1-11 - 2-7 | Louth | O'Connor Park, Tullamore |

| 1982 Semi-Final | Dublin | 2-10 - 0-3 | Wexford | Páirc Tailteann, Navan |

Final

| 1 August 1982 Final | Dublin | 0-10 - 0-5 | Westmeath | Croke Park, Dublin |

=== Ulster Minor Football Championship ===
Preliminary Round

| 1982 Preliminary Round | Tyrone | 1-9 - 2-5 | Monghan | O'Neill Park, Dungannon |

Quarter-Finals

| 1982 Quarter-Final | Arntrim | 1-7 - 0-8 | Cavan | Breffni Park, Cavan |

| 1982 Quarter-Final | Donegal | 1-9 - 1-8 | Armagh | MacCumhaill Park, Ballybofey |

| 1982 Quarter-Final | Derry | 2-13 - 3-6 | Fermanagh | St. Molaise Park, Irvinestown |

| 1982 Quarter-Final | Down | 0-7 - 0-5 | Antrim | Pairc Esler, Newry |

Semi-Finals

| 1982 Semi-Final | Donegal | 0-7 - 1-8 | Antrim | St. Tiernach's Park, Clones |

| 1982 Semi-Final | Derry | 2-5 - 0-11 | Down | Breffni Park, Cavan |

Final

| 18 July 1982 Final | Antrim | 2-10 - 3-5 | Down | St. Tiernach's Park, Clones |

=== Munster Minor Football Championship ===
Quarter-Final

| May 1982 Quarter-Final | Waterford | 0-5 - 4-9 | Clare | Bansha |

Semi-Final

| 6 June 1982 Semi-Final | Kerry | 0-14 - 0-7 | Clare | Cusack Park, Ennis |

Final

| 4 July 1982 Final | Kerry | 1-11 - 0-5 | Cork | Páirc Uí Chaoimh, Cork |

=== All-Ireland Minor Football Championship ===
Semi-Finals

| 15 August 1982 Semi-Final | Kerry | 1-7- 1-4 | Antrim | Croke Park, Dublin |

| 22 August 1982 Semi-Final | Dublin | 0-17 - 1-3 | Galway | Croke Park, Dublin |

Final

| 19 September 1982 Final | Dublin | 1-11 - 1-5 | Kerry | Croke Park, Dublin |
