= Michael Fitzmaurice (Gaelic footballer) =

Irish retired Gaelic footballer

Personal information
- Native name: Mícheál Mac Muiris (Irish)
- Born: 13 January 1967 (age 59) Lacken, County Mayo, Ireland
- Occupation: Coaching officer
- Height: 5 ft 11 in (180 cm)

Sport
- Sport: Gaelic football
- Position: Right corner-forward
Club
- Years: Club
- Lacken
Club titles
- Mayo titles: 0
Inter-county*
Years	County	Apps (scores)
1989-1993	Mayo	11 (0-52)
Inter-county titles
- Connacht titles: 1
- All-Irelands: 0
- NFL: 0
- All Stars: 0
- *Inter County team apps and scores correct as of 20:54, 13 November 2016.

Michael Fitzmaurice (born 13 January 1967) is an Irish former Gaelic footballer. His league and championship career at senior level with the Mayo county team lasted five seasons from 1989 until 1993.

Fitzmaurice made his debut on the inter-county scene when he was chosen for the Mayo minor team. He was captain of the side in 1985 and claimed an All-Ireland medal following a defeat of Cork. He subsequently lined out with the Mayo under-21 team. Fitzmaurice made his senior debut during the 1988-89 league. He was a regular on the starting fifteen over the next five years and won one Connacht medal. He was an All-Ireland runner-up in 1989. He finished the 1989 championship as the top scorer Fitzmaurice played his last game for Mayo in March 1993

== Career statistics ==
Team	Season	Connacht		All-Ireland		Total	
Team	Season	Apps	Score	Apps	Score	Apps	Score
Mayo	1989	4	0-19	2	0-13	6	0-32
Mayo	1990	1	0-07	0	0-00	1	0-07
Mayo	1991	4	0-13	0	0-00	4	0-13
Total		9	0-39	2	0-13	11	0-52

== Honours ==
Mayo

- Connacht Senior Football Championship (1): 1989

Achievements
Preceded by Paul Clarke (Dublin)	All-Ireland Minor Football Final winning captain 1985	Succeeded by John Joyce (Galway)
