= 1983 Cork Senior Football Championship =

Gaelic football competition

- Dates: 17 April 1983 – 23 November 1983
- Teams: 23
- Champions: Nemo Rangers (7th title); Jimmy Kerrigan (captain)
- Runners-up: Clonakilty; Michael O'Neill (captain)

Tournament statistics
- Matches played: 23
- Goals scored: 46 (2 per match)
- Points scored: 346 (15.04 per match)
- Top scorer(s): Ephie Fitzgerald (2-23)

The 1983 Cork Senior Football Championship was the 95th staging of the Cork Senior Football Championship since its establishment by the Cork County Board in 1887. The draw for the opening round fixtures took place on 30 January 1983. The championship began on 17 April 1983 and ended on 23 November 1983.

St. Finbarr's entered the championship as the defending champions, however, they were beaten by Nemo Rangers at the semi-final stage.

On 27 November 1983, Nemo Rangers won the championship following a 4-12 to 2-03 defeat of Clonakilty in the final. This was their seventh championship title overall and their first title since 1981.

Ephie Fitzgerald from the Nemo Rangers club was the championship's top scorer with 2-23.

== Results ==
=== First round ===
17 April 1983 First round	Beara	0-04 - 2-16	Nemo Rangers	Sam Maguire Park, Dunmanway
	P Murphy 0-2, D O'Driscoll 0-1, JF O'Sullivan 0-1.		D Allen 1-3, S Coughlan 1-2, E Fitzgerald 0-5, T Dalton 0-2, Donal Murphy 0-1, T Nation 0-1, J Kerrigan 0-1, Declan Murphy 0-1.

17 April 1983 First round	Duhallow	1-08 - 2-06	Carbery	Macroom
	J Fitzgerald 1-2, D Kelleher 0-3, T Walsh 0-2, N O'Connor 0-1.		M McCarthy 1-1, G O'Driscoll 1-0, T Davis 0-2, M Cahalane 0-1, N Crowley 0-1, R Wilmot 0-1.

17 April 1983 First round	Millstreet	1-06 - 0-10	Bishopstown	Macroom
	D Long 1-2, L Buckley 0-2, D O'Driscoll 0-1, A Barry 0-1.		M Lyons 0-3, E Lyons 0-2, C Coffey 0-2, J Crowley 0-1, M McGrath 0-1, B O'Leary 0-1.

17 April 1983 First round	Avondhu	1-09 - 1-09	St Michael's	Castlelyons
	D O'Hagan 1-3, S O'Gorman 0-4, T Cole 0-1, B O'Neill 0-1.		P Fitzgerald 1-2, P Kavanagh 0-2, G Healy 0-2, T Cashman 0-1, D Buckley 0-1, D O'Gorman 0-1.

17 April 1983 First round	University College Cork	2-09 - 1-09	Imokilly	Riverstown
	C O'Neill 1-1, J Mulvihill 1-0, M Crowley 0-3, H Moynihan 0-2, M O'Sullivan 0-1, E Walsh 0-1, O Honeyman 0-1.		T Murphy 0-5, K O'Connell 1-0, K Hennessy 0-2, S Gardiner 0-1, J Hartnett 0-1.

17 April 1983 First round	Seandún	3-07 - 1-06	Carrigdhoun	Páirc Liam Mhic Cárthaigh, Ballygarvan
	M O'Regan 1-2, C O'Reilly 1-0, J O'Sullivan 1-0, K O'Reilly 0-3, R Cole 0-1, D Kennedy 0-1.		A Fahy 1-1, M Jennings 0-2, B Kelleher 0-1, T Wilkinson 0-1, T Cussen 0-1.	Referee: N Hallihan (Bandon)

17 April 1983 First round	St. Finbarr's	3-09 - 0-05	Kildorrery	Castlelyons
	K McCarthy 3-2, J Allen 0-2, D Barry 0-2, J O'Callaghan 0-1, F O'Mahony 0-1, J Barry-Murphy 0-1.		J Moynihan 0-1, J Piggott 0-1, T Moynihan 0-1, J Fouhy 0-1, J O'Connor 0-1.	Referee: J Dennigan (Fermoy)

29 April 1983 First round replay	Avondhu	0-12 - 1-11	St Michael's	Castlelyons
	T Cole 0-4, S O'Gorman 0-2, J O'Brien 0-2, M Fitzgibbon 0-1, P Buckley 0-1, B O'Neill 0-1, R Connolly 0-1.		P Kavanagh 1-1, G Healy 0-3, D Buckley 0-3, D O'Gorman 0-1, T Ahern 0-1, E O'Donoghue 0-1, P Fitzgerald 0-1.	Referee: F Halbert (Glenville)

=== Second round ===
17 April 1983 Second round	Castlehaven	1-11 - 0-04	Muskerry	Sam Maguire Park, Dunmanway
	J Cleary 0-5, C Collins 1-1, F Collins 0-1, P Burke 0-1, A Collins 0-1, M Burns 0-1, B Terry 0-1.		M McDonnell 0-1, B McCarthy 0-1, D O'Driscoll 0-1, D Creedon 0-1.

24 April 1983 Second round	Macroom	1-09 - 0-07	St. Nicholas'	Ovens
	L Gould 0-5, B Lynch 1-0, Timmy O'Sullivan 0-1, Tommy O'Sullivan 0-1, M Browne 0-1, M O'Riordan 0-1.		J Buckley 0-2, F O'Sullivan 0-2, T O'Brien 0-1, T O'Neill 0-1, M Murphy 0-1.	Referee: D O'Connor

1 May 1983 Second round	Clonakilty	1-04 - 0-06	Seandún	Ballinspittle
	J O'Donovan 1-1, E O'Mahony 0-2, D McCarthy 0-1.		K O'Reilly 0-5, W McCarthy 0-1.

1 May 1983 Second round	University College Cork	0-11 - 0-05	Bantry Blues	Cloughduv
	H Moynohan 0-5, O Honeyman 0-3, M Keating 0-1, B Lotty 0-1, C O'Neill 0-1.		P O'Driscoll 0-3, R Hennessy 0-1, D Barron 0-1.	Referee: M Keane (Cloughduv)

15 May 1983 Second round	Na Piarsaigh	0-06 - 0-07	Carbery	Macroom
	R McDonnell 0-4, C Coughlan 0-1, D Reilly 0-1.		T Murphy 0-3, M Cahalane 0-2, M McCarthy 0-1, A Desmond 0-1.	Referee: J Crean (Aghabullogue)

22 May 1983 Second round	St Michael's	0-06 - 1-09	Nemo Rangers	Páirc Uí Chaoimh, Cork
	D Buckley 0-2, J Murphy 0-1, T Cashman 0-1, J Healy 0-1, D Gorman 0-1.		E Fitzgerald 1-5, J Kerrigan 0-2, S Coughlan 0-1, T Dalton 0-1.

22 May 1983 Second round	Naomh Abán	2-05 - 1-16	St. Finbarr's	Coachford
	D McCarthy 2-1, D Healy 0-2, J Lynch 0-1, J Hoare 0-1.		F O'Mahony 1-3, K McCarthy 0-3, J O'Callaghan 0-3, D Barry 0-2, T O'Reilly 0-2, J Barry-Murphy 0-1, D Philpott 0-1, T Leahy 0-1.

22 May 1983 Second round	Dohenys	0-02 - 1-06	Bishopstown	Páirc Naomh Eoin, Newcestown
	B Herlihy 0-1, I Kingston 0-1.		R McCarrig 1-0, E Lyons 0-3, M Lyons 0-2, C Coffey 0-1.

=== Quarter-finals ===
19 June 1983 Quarter-final	Clonakilty	1-08 - 1-03	University College Cork	Charlie Hurley Park, Bandon
	E O'Mahony 1-5, D McCarthy 0-2, B Crowley 0-1.		B Lotty 1-0, C O'Neill 0-1, M Keating 0-1, H Moynihan 0-1.

6 August 1983 Quarter-final	Nemo Rangers	1-08 - 1-05	Carbery	Clonakilty
	E Fitzgerald 0-5, D Allen 1-0, S Coughlan 0-2, Charlie Murphy 0-1.		M Connolly 1-3, M Cahalane 0-1, R Wilmot 0-1.

11 September 1983 Quarter-final	St. Finbarr's	1-11 - 0-11	Castlehaven	Charlie Hurley Park, Bandon
	D Barry 1-1, T Leahy 0-3, J O'Callaghan 0-3, R Kenny 0-2, M Healy 0-1, F O'Mahony 0-1.		TJ O'Regan 0-6, J Cleary 0-1, C Collins 0-1, D Cleary 0-1, M Burns 0-1, F Collins.

25 September 1983 Quarter-final	Bishopstown	2-05 - 1-07	Macroom	Ovens
	J O'Connell 1-2, C Coffey 1-0, G McCarthy 0-1, B O'Leary 0-1, B Coffey 0-1.		C Foley 1-1, L Gould 0-3, Timmy O'Sullivan 0-1, Tommy O'Sullivan 0-1, E Gould 0-1.

=== Semi-finals ===
2 October 1983 Semi-final	Clonakilty	2-07 - 1-07	Bishopstown	Charlie Hurley Park, Bandon
	E O'Mahony 2-3, J O'Donovan 0-1, B Crowley 0-1, D McCarthy 0-1, R O'Donovan 0-1.		M McGrath 1-0, E Lyons 0-2, J O'Connell 0-2, G McCarthy 0-1, B Coffey 0-1, J Crowley 0-1.

13 November 1983 Semi-final	St. Finbarr's	0-04 - 2-05	Nemo Rangers	Páirc Uí Chaoimh, Cork
	D Barry 0-3, T O'Reilly 0-1.		S Coughlan 2-0, E Fitzgerald 0-3, D Allen 0-1, S Hayes 0-1.	Referee: E Porter

=== Final ===
27 November 1983 Final	Nemo Rangers	4-12 - 2-03	Clonakilty	Páirc Uí Chaoimh, Cork
	E Fitzgerald 1-5, M Dorgan 1-1, D Allen 0-4, C Murphy 1-0, T Dalton 1-0, S Coughlan 0-1, J Kerrigan 0-1.		E O'Mahony 1-2, J O'Donovan 1-0, D McCarthy 0-1.	Attendance: 7,048; Referee: D Casey

== Championship statistics ==
=== Top scorers ===
Overall

Rank	Player	Club	Tally	Total	Matches	Average
1	Ephie Fitzgerald	Nemo Rangers	2-23	29	5	5.80
2	Eoin O'Mahony	Clonakilty	4-12	24	4	6.00
3	Séamus Coughlan	Nemo Rangers	3-06	15	5	3.00
4	Kieran McCarthy	St. Finbarr's	3-05	14	4	3.50
4	Dinny Allen	Nemo Rangers	2-08	14	5	2.80
6	Dave Barry	St. Finbarr's	1-08	11	4	2.75

In a single game

Rank	Player	Club	Tally	Total	Opposition
1	Kieran McCarthy	St. Finbarr's	3-02	11	Kildorrery
2	Eoin O'Mahony	Clonakilty	2-03	9	Bishopstown
3	Ephie Fitzgerald	Nemo Rangers	1-05	8	St Michael's
3	Eoin O'Mahony	Clonakilty	1-05	8	UCC
3	Ephie Fitzgerald	Nemo Rangers	1-05	8	Clonakilty
6	Diarmuid McCarthy	Naomh Abán	2-01	7	St. Finbarr's
7	Séamus Coughlan	Nemo Rangers	2-00	6	St. Finbarr's
7	Dinny Allen	Nemo Rangers	1-03	6	Beara
7	Damien O'Hagan	Avondhu	1-03	6	St Michael's
7	Finny O'Mahony	St. Finbarr's	1-03	6	Naomh Abán
7	Martin Connolly	Carbery	1-03	6	Nemo Rangers
7	T. J. O'Regan	Castlehaven	0-06	6	St. Finbarr's
