= 1951 Cork Junior Football Championship =

Irish hurling competition

- Champions: Glanmire (3rd title)
- Runners-up: Delaney Rovers

The 1951 Cork Junior Football Championship was the 53rd staging of the Cork Junior Football Championship since its establishment by the Cork County Board in 1895.

The final, a replay, was played on 25 November 1951 at the Athletic Grounds in Cork, between Glanmire and Delaney Rovers, in what was their first ever meeting in the final. Glanmire won the match by 3–02 to 1–05 to claim their third championship title overall and a first championship title in 1937 Cork Junior Football Championship|14 years.

== Results ==
=== Final ===
4 November 1951 Final	Glanmire	1–04 – 1–04	Delaney Rovers	Cork Athletic Grounds

=== Final replay ===
25 November 1951 Final replay	Glanmire	3–02 – 1–05	Delaney Rovers	Cork Athletic Grounds
