= 1988–89 All-Ireland Senior Club Football Championship =

Irish Football Championship

- Teams: 33
- Champions: Nemo Rangers (5th title); Tony Nation (captain); Billy Morgan (manager)
- Runners-up: Clann na nGael

The 1988–89 All-Ireland Senior Club Football Championship was the 19th staging of the All-Ireland Senior Club Football Championship since its establishment by the Gaelic Athletic Association in 1970-71.

St. Mary's Burren entered the championship as the defending champions, however, they were beaten by Clann na nGael in the All-Ireland semi-final.

On 17 March 1989, Nemo Rangers won the championship following a 1-13 to 1-03 defeat of Clann na nGael in the All-Ireland final at Croke Park. It was their fifth championship title overall and their first title since 1984.

== Munster ==
=== First round ===
29 October 1988 First round	Fethard	0-09 - 2-02	Claughaun	Clonmel Sportsground
	J Keane 0-3, T Sheehan 0-2, B Burke 0-2, L Connolly 0-1, W O'Meara 0-1.		M Galligan 1-1, L O'Connor 1-0, T Moloney 0-1.

30 October 1988 First round	Castleisland Desmonds	1-13 - 3-08	Doonbeg	FitzGerald Stadium
	M Downey 0-5, J Lordan 1-0, C Kearney 0-3, J Lyons 0-2, D Lyne 0-2, D Hannifin 0-1.		F McInerney 1-4, P Conway 1-0, D Hayes 1-0, G Killeen 0-3, D Bermingham 0-1.

=== Semi-finals ===
13 November 1988 Semi-final	Fethard	1-07 - 3-06	Kilrossanty	Barracks Field
	O Cummins 1-1, J Kane 0-2, L Connolly 0-1, M Downs 0-1, M O'Riordan (snr) 0-1, M O'Riordan (jnr) 0-1.		J Mulhern 1-2, R Power 1-1, M Walsh 1-0, J Maher 0-2, G Walsh 0-1.

13 November 1988 Semi-final	Doonbeg	0-04 - 3-11	Nemo Rangers	Páirc Naomh Seancháin
	G Killeen 0-2, S Hayes 0-1, P Hanrahan 0-1.		M Dorgan 1-3, E O'Mahony 0-5, D Allen 1-0, E Fitzgerald 1-0, P O'Donovan 0-2, S Callanan 0-1.

=== Final ===
27 November 1988 Final	Nemo Rangers	1-06 - 1-02	Kilrossanty	Clonmel Sportsground
	E Fitzgerald 1-4, D Allen 0-1, T Dalton 0-1.		J Mulhern 1-0, G Walsh 0-1, J Maher 0-1.

== Quarter-final ==
12 December 1988 Quarter-final	Nemo Rangers	3-15 - 0-02	John Mitchels	Ballinlough

== Semi-finals ==
19 February 1989 Semi-final	Burren	1-05 - 1-06	Clann na nGael	St Mary's Park

19 February 1989 Semi-final	Nemo Rangers	1-04 - 0-05	Parnells	Páirc Liam Mhic Cárthaigh

== Final ==
17 March 1989 Final	Nemo Rangers	1-13 - 1-03	Clann na nGael	Croke Park

== Statistics ==
=== Miscellaneous ===
- Clann na nGael became the first team to win five successive Connacht Club Championship titles.
- Parnells won the Leinster Club Championship for the first time in their history.
- Burren became the first team to win five Ulster Club Championship titles.
