= Glanmire GFC =

Gaelic football club in County Cork, Ireland

Glanmire
- Gleann Maghair
- Founded: 1886
- County: Cork
- Colours
- Grounds: Glanmire GAA Grounds

Playing kits
Standard colours

Senior Club Championships
	All Ireland	Munster champions	Cork champions
Football:	0	0	0

Glanmire Gaelic Football Club is a Gaelic Athletic Association club located in Glanmire, County Cork, Ireland. The club is affiliated to the Imokilly Board and the Cork County Board. As a sister club of Sarsfields Hurling Club, Glanmire is solely concerned with Gaelic football.

== History ==
Located in Glanmire, a suburban town about 9 km from Cork, Glanmire Gaelic Football Club was founded in 1886 and was one of the first to affiliate to the new Cork County Board. The club took part in the first inter-county Gaelic football game under GAA rules when they played Fethard from Tipperary in a tournament in August 1886. Glanmire were also one of six clubs to take part in the inaugural Cork SFC in 1887.

Glanmire won the Cork JFC title for the first time in 1923. The club subsequently went out of existence, however, it was revived in 1945. Success was immediate, with Glanmire winning the first of a record 13 East Cork JFC titles in 1946. Further Cork JFC titles were won in 1951 and 1958.

Glanmire secured senior status for the first time in 1987, when the club won the Cork IFC title following a 3–05 to 0–06 win over Fermoy in the final. Glanmire won a second Cork IFC in 2024, after beating Boherbue by one point in the final.

== Honours ==
- Cork Intermediate A Football Championship (2): 1987, 2024
- Cork Junior Football Championship (3): 1923, 1951, 1958
- East Cork Junior A Football Championship (13): 1946, 1950, 1951, 1957, 1958, 1963, 1964, 1965, 1966, 1968, 1970, 1971, 1977
- Rebel Óg Premier 1 Minor Football Championship (1) 2020
- Rebel Óg Premier 2 Minor Football Championship (1) 2019

== Notable players ==
- Derry Beckett: All-Ireland SFC-winner (1945)
- Teddy McCarthy: All-Ireland SFC-winner (1989, 1990)
