= 1986 All-Ireland Under-21 Football Championship =

Gaelic football competition

Championship details

All-Ireland Champions
- Winning team: Cork (7th win)
- Captain: Mick Slocum

All-Ireland Finalists
- Losing team: Offaly

Provincial Champions
- Munster: Cork
- Leinster: Offaly
- Ulster: Derry
- Connacht: Mayo

The 1986 All-Ireland Under-21 Football Championship was the 23rd staging of the All-Ireland Under-21 Football Championship since its establishment by the Gaelic Athletic Association in 1964.

Cork entered the championship as defending champions.

On 14 September 1986, Cork won the championship following a 3-16 to 0-12 defeat of Offaly in the All-Ireland final. This was their seventh All-Ireland title overall and their third in successive seasons.

== Results ==
=== All-Ireland Under-21 Football Championship ===
Semi-finals

9 August 1986 Semi-final	Offaly	1-11 - 1-11	Mayo	Dr. Hyde Park, Roscommon

9 August 1986 Semi-final	Cork	1-13 - 2-08	Derry	Parnell Park, Dublin

17 August 1986 Semi-final replay	Offaly	1-15 - 0-07	Mayo	Dr. Hyde Park, Roscommon

Finals

14 September 1986 Final	Cork	3-16 - 0-12	Offaly	Semple Stadium, Thurles

== Statistics ==
=== Miscellaneous ===
- Cork become the second team after Kerry in 1977 to win three successive All-Ireland titles.
