= Ephie Fitzgerald =

Cork Gaelic footballer (born 1961)

Personal information
- Native name: Eafráim Mac Gearailt (Irish)
- Nickname: Ephie
- Born: 1961 (age 64–65) Cork, Ireland
- Occupation: Secondary school teacher

Sport
- Sport: Gaelic football
- Position: Right corner-forward
Club
- Years: Club
- Nemo Rangers
Inter-county*
Years	County	Apps (scores)
	Cork	1
Inter-county titles
- Munster titles: 1
- All-Irelands: 0
- NFL: 0
- All Stars: 0
- *Inter County team apps and scores correct as of 16:58, 18 October 2014.

Ephraim "Ephie" Fitzgerald (born 1961) is an Irish Gaelic football manager who played as a right corner-forward at senior level for the Cork county team. He has been manager of the Waterford county team since 2025, having previously managed the same team between 2021 and 2023.

== Career ==
Born in Cork, Fitzgerald first played competitive Gaelic football whilst at school at Coláiste Chríost Rí. He arrived on the inter-county scene at the age of seventeen when he first linked up with the Cork minor team, before later lining out with the under-21 side. He made his senior debut in the 1982 championship. Fitzgerald went on to play a brief role for the team over the next few years, winning one Munster medal.

At club level Fitzgerald is a four-time All-Ireland medallist with Nemo Rangers. He has also won five Munster medals and five championship medals.

Throughout his career Fitzgerald made 3 championship appearances for Cork. He retired from inter-county football following the conclusion of the 1983 championship.

In retirement from playing Fitzgerald became involved in coaching and team management. At club level he guided Nemo Rangers and Ballylanders to championship success, while at inter-county level he served as manager of the Cork minor team and coach of the Limerick senior team. In October 2014, Fitzgerald was appointed as a coach and selector to the Clare senior team.

He managed the Cork senior ladies' football team until 2021.

In October 2021, he was appointed for a two-year term as Waterford senior manager. After this he was replaced by Paul Shankey, only to succeed Shankey in August 2025.

== Honours ==
=== Player ===
Nemo Rangers

- All-Ireland Senior Club Football Championship (3): 1982, 1984, 1988, 1994
- Munster Senior Club Football Championship (5): 1981, 1983, 1987 (c), 1988, 1993
- Cork Senior Club Football Championship (5): 1981, 1983, 1987 (c), 1988, 1993

Cork

- Munster Senior Football Championship (1): 1983
- All-Ireland Under-21 Football Championship (2): 1980, 1981
- Munster Under-21 Football Championship (3): 1980, 1981, 1982

=== Manager/coach ===
Nemo Rangers

- Munster Senior Club Football Championship (2): 2005, 2007
- Cork Senior Club Football Championship (4): 2005, 2006, 2007, 2008

Ballylanders

- Limerick Senior Club Football Championship (1): 2014

Cork Ladies

- All-Ireland Senior Ladies' Football Championship (1): 2016
- Ladies' National Football League (2): 2016, 2017

Sporting positions
Preceded by Brian Cuthbert	Cork Minor Football Team Manager; 2011–2013	Succeeded by Donal O'Sullivan
Preceded by Éamonn Ryan	Cork Senior Ladies' Football Team Manager; 2016–2021	Succeeded by Shane Ronayne
Preceded by Shane Ronayne	Waterford Senior Football Team Manager; 2021–2023	Succeeded by Paul Shankey
Preceded by Paul Shankey	Waterford Senior Football Team Manager; 2025–	Succeeded by Incumbent
Achievements
Preceded by Éamonn Ryan	All-Ireland SLFC winning manager 2016	Succeeded by Mick Bohan
