= 1983 All-Ireland Minor Football Championship =

Gaelic football competition

Championship details

All-Ireland Champions
- Winning team: Derry (2nd win)

All-Ireland Finalists
- Losing team: Cork

Provincial Champions
- Munster: Cork
- Leinster: Kildare
- Ulster: Derry
- Connacht: Galway

The 1983 All-Ireland Minor Football Championship was the 52nd staging of the All-Ireland Minor Football Championship, the Gaelic Athletic Association's premier inter-county Gaelic football tournament for boys under the age of 18.

Dublin entered the championship as defending champions, however, they were defeated in the Leinster Championship.

On 18 September 1983, Derry won the championship following a 0-8 to 1-3 defeat of Cork in the All-Ireland final. This was their second All-Ireland title overall and their first in 18 championship seasons.

== Results ==
=== Connacht Minor Football Championship ===
Quarter-Final

29 May 1983 Quarter-Final	Roscommon	2-08 - 1-09	Mayo	Dr Hyde Park, Roscommon
				Referee: P. Egan (Galway).

Semi-Finals

5 June 1983 Semi-Final	Roscommon	1-15 - 1-04	Sligo	Markievicz Park, Sligo
				Referee: J. Flynn (Leitrim).

26 June 1983 Semi-Final	Galway	1-03 - 0-04	Leitrim	Páirc Seán Mac Diarmada, Carrick-on-Shannon
				Referee: J. Cosgrove (Mayo)

Final

17 July 1983 Final	Galway	2-10 - 2-05	Roscommon	McHale Park, Castlebar
				Referee: P. Egan (Leitrim)

=== Munster Minor Football Championship ===
Quarter-Finals

1983 Quarter-Final	Waterford	0-06 - 0-05	Limerick	Seán Treacy Park, Tipperary

1983 Quarter-Final	Cork	1-13 - 1-07	Kerry	FitzGerald Park, Kilmallock

Semi-Finals

3 July 1983 Semi-Final	Tipperary	2-07 - 0-06	Waterford	Fraher Field, Dungarvan

3 July 1983 Semi-Final	Cork	3-15 - 0-05	Clare	Cusack Park, Ennis

Final

24 July 1983 Final	Cork	1-11 - 1-05	Tipperary	Páirc Uí Chaoimh, Cork

=== Leinster Minor Football Championship ===
Preliminary Round

May 1983 Preliminary Round	Meath	7-17 - 0-01	Kilkenny	Geraldine Park, Athy

May 1983 Preliminary Round	Westmeath	2-04 - 1-03	Louth	Croke Park, Dublin

May 1983 Preliminary Round	Carlow	2-12 - 0-02	Longford	O'Connor Park, Tullamore

May 1983 Preliminary Round	Wicklow	2-08 - 0-04	Wexford	Dr Cullen Park, Carlow

Quarter-Finals

June 1983 Quarter-Final	Meath	2-07 - 0-06	Dublin	Drogheda Park, Drogheda

June 1983 Quarter-Final	Kildare	1-12 - 3-04	Carlow	Geraldine Park, Athy

June 1983 Quarter-Final	Offaly	2-07 - 1-08	Wicklow	St Conleth's Park, Newbridge

June 1983 Quarter-Final	Westmeath	0-09 - 2-08	Laois	O'Connor Park, Tullamore

Semi-Finals

July 1983 Semi-Final	Meath	1-07 - 1-07	Laois	Croke Park, Dublin

July 1983 Semi-Final	Kildare	2-04 - 1-07	Offaly	Páirc Tailteann, Navan

July 1983 Semi-Final Replay	Kildare	2-13 - 1-10	Offaly	Cusack Park, Mullingar

Final

31 July 1983 Final	Kildare	1-11 - 1-06	Meath	Croke Park, Dublin

=== Ulster Minor Football Championship ===
Preliminary Round

May 1983 Preliminary Round	Armagh	3-08 - 2-08	Monaghan

Quarter-Finals

June 1983 Quarter-Final	Derry	5-07 - 2-09	Cavan	Dean McGlinchey Park, Ballinascreen

June 1983 Quarter-Final	Armagh	2-02 - 0-07	Donegal	Athletic Grounds, Armagh

June 1983 Quarter-Final	Monaghan	1-09 - 0-06	Antrim	St Mary's Park, Castleblaney

June 1983 Quarter-Final	Donegal	3-08 - 2-14	Armagh	MacCumhaill Park, Ballybofey

June 1983 Quarter-Final	Derry	3-12 - 1-08	Tyrone	Breffni Park, Cavan

Semi-Finals

July 1983 Semi-Final	Armagh	3-04 - 2-08	Monaghan	St. Molaise Park, Irvinestown

July 1983 Semi-Final	Derry	3-02 - 1-06	Down	St. Tiernach's Park, Clones

Final

24 July 1983 Final	Derry	3-09 - 0-04	Monaghan	St. Tiernach's Park, Clones

=== All-Ireland Minor Football Championship ===
Semi-Finals

14 August 1983 Semi-Final	Derry	0-16 - 3-05	Galway	Croke Park, Dublin

21 August 1983 Semi-Final	Kildare	2-07 - 0-14	Cork	Croke Park, Dublin

Final

18 September 1983 Final	Derry	0-08 - 1-03	Cork	Croke Park, Dublin
