= 1985 All-Ireland Under-21 Football Championship =

Gaelic football competition

Championship details

All-Ireland Champions
- Winning team: Cork (6th win)
- Captain: Tony Davis

All-Ireland Finalists
- Losing team: Derry

Provincial Champions
- Munster: Cork
- Leinster: Meath
- Ulster: Derry
- Connacht: Mayo

The 1985 All-Ireland Under-21 Football Championship was the 22nd staging of the All-Ireland Under-21 Football Championship since its establishment by the Gaelic Athletic Association in 1964.

Cork entered the championship as defending champions.

On 25 August 1985, Cork won the championship following a 0-14 to 1-8 defeat of Derry in the All-Ireland final. This was their sixth All-Ireland title overall and their second in successive seasons.

== Results ==
=== All-Ireland Under-21 Football Championship ===
Semi-finals

4 August 1985 Semi-final	Derry	2-03 - 0-09	Mayo	Páirc Seán Mac Diarmada, Carrick

4 August 1985 Semi-final	Cork	2-13 - 1-03	Meath	O'Moore Park, Portlaoise

11 August 1985 Semi-final replay	Derry	3-09 - 3-06	Mayo	Brewster Park, Enniskillen

Finals

25 August 1985 Final	Cork	0-14 - 1-08	Derry	Croke Park, Dublin

== Statistics ==
=== Miscellaneous ===
- Meath win the Leinster title for the first time in their history.
- The All-Ireland final between Cork and Derry is the very first championship meeting between the two teams.
