= 1987–88 All-Ireland Senior Club Football Championship =

Irish Football Championship

- Teams: 33
- Champions: St. Mary's Burren (2nd title)
- Runners-up: Clann na nGael

The 1987–88 All-Ireland Senior Club Football Championship was the 18th staging of the All-Ireland Senior Club Football Championship since its establishment by the Gaelic Athletic Association in 1970-71.

St Finbarr's were the defending champions, however, they failed to qualify after being beaten by Muskerry in the second round of the 1987 Cork County Championship.

On 17 March 1988, Burren won the championship following a 1-09 to 0-08 defeat of Clann na nGael in the All-Ireland final at Croke Park. It was their second championship title overall and their first title since 1986.

== Munster ==
=== First round ===
| 1 November 1987 First round | Kilrush Shamrocks | 0-07 - 0-08 | Newcastle West | Cusack Park |
| | M Fennell 0-3, J Roche 0-2, J Fennell 0-1, D O'Doherty 0-1. | | S Gleeson 0-5, L Keane 0-1, M Mulcahy 0-1, P O'Connor 0-1. |

| 21 November 1987 First round | Stradbally | 1-06 - 1-14 | Nemo Rangers | Páirc Uí Cuimín |
| | J Keane 1-0, N Weldon 0-3, E O'Brien 0-2, L O'Brien 0-1. | | M Dorgan 1-2, T Nation 0-3, D Allen 0-2, C Murphy 0-2, T Dalton 0-2, S O'Brien 0-1, E Fitzgerald 0-1, S Fahy 0-1. |

=== Semi-finals ===
| 29 November 1987 Semi-final | Newcastle West | 3-03 - 2-05 | Loughmore–Castleiney | Páirc na nGael |
| | S Gleeson 2-0, J Kenny 1-1, T Kelly 0-1, K O'Grady 0-1. | | P McDevitt 1-0, J McCormack 1-0, J Maher 0-2, N Ryan 0-1, J Treacy 0-1, M McGrath 0-1. |

| 12 December 1987 Semi-final | Nemo Rangers | 2-10 - 1-06 | Dr Crokes | Ballinlough Sportsfield |
| | S O'Brien 1-2, M Dorgan 1-0, T Dalton 0-3, S Fahy 0-2, T Nation 0-1, E Fitzpatrick 0-1, G O'Regan 0-1. | | S O'Shea 1-1, P O'Shea 0-2, C Murphy 0-1, N O'Leary 0-1, M Buckley 0-1. |

=== Final ===
| 20 December 1987 Final | Nemo Rangers | 5-15 - 2-03 | Newcastle West | FitzGerald Stadium |
| | T Nation 1-4, D Allen 2-0, G O'Regan 2-0, E Fitzgerald 0-5, S O'Brien 0-3, M Dorgan 0-2, T Dalton 0-1. | | L Keane 1-1, M Mulcahy 1-0, K O'Grady 0-1, J Kenny 0-1. |

== Quarter-final ==
| 31 January 1988 Quarter-final | Clann na nGael | 0-16 - 0-07 | Kingdom Kerry Gaels | Kiltoom |

== Semi-finals ==
| 21 February 1988 Semi-final | Nemo Rangers | 0-06 - 1-05 | Burren | Clonmult Memorial Park |

| 21 February 1988 Semi-final | Portlaoise | 0-09 - 1-09 | Clann na nGael | O'Moore Park |

== Final ==
| 17 March 1988 Final | Burren | 1-09 - 0-08 | Clann na nGael | Croke Park |

== Statistics ==
=== Miscellaneous ===
- Clann na nGael became the first team to win four successive Connacht Club Championship titles.
- Portlaoise became the first team to win five Leinster Club Championship titles.
- Burren became the first team to win four Ulster Club Championship titles.
