= 1981 All-Ireland Minor Football Championship =

Gaelic football competition

Championship details

All-Ireland Champions
- Winning team: Cork (7th win)

All-Ireland Finalists
- Losing team: Derry

Provincial Champions
- Munster: Cork
- Leinster: Dublin
- Ulster: Derry
- Connacht: Roscommon

The 1981 All-Ireland Minor Football Championship was the 50th staging of the All-Ireland Minor Football Championship, the Gaelic Athletic Association's premier inter-county Gaelic football tournament for boys under the age of 18.

Kerry entered the championship as defending champions, however, they were defeated by Cork in the Munster final.

On 20 September 1981, Cork won the championship following a 4-9 to 2-7 defeat of Derry in the All-Ireland final. This was their seventh All-Ireland title overall and their first in seven championship seasons.

== Results ==
=== Connacht Minor Football Championship ===
Quarter-Final

1981 Quarter-Final	Galway	1-13 - 1-06	Leitrim	McHale Park, Castlebar

Semi-Finals

1981 Semi-Final	Roscommon	2-06 - 1-06	Sligo	Dr Hyde Park, Roscommon

1981 Semi-Final	Galway	0-05 - 2-08	Mayo	St Jarlath's Park, Tuam

Final

12 July 1981 Final	Roscommon	2-08 - 3-04	Mayo	McHale Park, Castlebar

=== Munster Minor Football Championship ===
Quarter-Finals

1981 Quarter-Final	Cork	7-22 - 1-02	Waterford	Pairc Ui Rinn, Cork

1981 Quarter-Final	Kerry	1-09 - 0-03	Clare	Finuge

Semi-Finals

1981 Semi-Final	Cork	5-11 - 3-04	Limerick	Buttevant

1981 Semi-Final	Kerry	2-13 - 1-03	Tipperary	Killorglin

Final

19 July 1981 Final	Kerry	1-05 - 0-09	Cork	Fitzgerald Stadium, Killarney

=== Ulster Minor Football Championship ===
Preliminary Round

1981 Preliminary Round	Tyrone	4-04 - 3-06	Monaghan	St. Mary's Park, Castleblaney

Quarter-Finals

1981 Quarter-Final	Antrim	0-06 - 1-08	Cavan	Casement Park, Belfast

1981 Quarter-Final	Armagh	2-08 - 0-07	Donegal	Athletic Grounds, Armagh

1981 Quarter-Final	Derry	3-07 - 1-02	Fermanagh	Dean McGlinchey Park, Ballinascreen

1981 Quarter-Final	Down	0-10 - 0-08	Tyrone	Pairc Esler, Newry

Semi-Finals

1981 Semi-Final	Derry	3-08 - 1-07	Cavan	St. Mary's Park, Castleblaney

1981 Semi-Final	Derry	3-06 - 2-08	Down	St. Tiernach's Park, Clones

Final

19 July 1981 Final	Derry	0-11 - 1-02	Armagh	St. Tiernach's Park, Clones

=== Leinster Minor Football Championship ===
Preliminary Round

1981 Preliminary Round	Westmeath	2-06 - 2-03	Longford	Pearse Park, Longford

1981 Preliminary Round	Wicklow	1-09 - 1-04	Carlow	Geraldine Park, Athy

1981 Preliminary Round	Wexford	3-19 - 0-01	Kilkenny	Nowlan Park, Kilkenny

1981 Preliminary Round	Laois	1-07 - 0-08	Louth	Croke Park, Dublin

Quarter-Finals

1981 Quarter-Final	Dublin	0-12 - 2-05	Wicklow	Knockbridge

1981 Quarter-Final	Offaly	0-11 - 0-03	Westmeath	Cusack Park, Mullingar

1981 Quarter-Final	Kildare	0-10 - 1-06	Laois

1981 Quarter-Final	Meath	1-08 - 0-03	Wexford

Semi-Finals

1981 Semi-Final	Meath	3-07 - 1-09	Offaly	Croke Park, Dublin

1981 Semi-Final	Dublin	2-09 - 1-04	Kildare	O'Connor Park, Tullamore

Final

26 July 1981 Final	Dublin	1-08 - 0-09	Meath	Croke Park, Dublin

=== All-Ireland Minor Football Championship ===
Semi-Finals

9 August 1981 Semi-Final	Cork	5-11 - 3-05	Roscommon	Croke Park, Dublin

16 August 1981 Semi-Final	Dublin	0-06 - 0-08	Derry	Croke Park, Dublin

Final

20 September 1981 Final	Cork	4-09 - 2-07	Derry	Croke Park, Dublin
