= 1989 All-Ireland Senior Football Championship =

Football championship

Championship details
- Dates: 14 May – 17 September 1989
- Teams: 32

All-Ireland Champions
- Winning team: Cork (5th win)
- Captain: Dinny Allen
- Manager: Billy Morgan

All-Ireland Finalists
- Losing team: Mayo
- Captain: Jimmy Browne
- Manager: John O'Mahony

Provincial Champions
- Munster: Cork
- Leinster: Dublin
- Ulster: Tyrone
- Connacht: Mayo

Championship statistics
- No. matches played: 34
- Top Scorer: Michael Fitzmaurice (0–32)
- Player of the Year: Teddy McCarthy

The 1989 All-Ireland Senior Football Championship was the 103rd staging of the All-Ireland Senior Football Championship, the Gaelic Athletic Association's premier inter-county Gaelic football tournament. The championship began on 14 May 1989 and ended on 17 September 1989.

Meath were the defending champions, however, they were defeated by Dublin in the Leinster final.

On 17 September 1989, Cork won the championship following a 0–17 to 1–11 defeat of Mayo in the All-Ireland final. This was their 5th All-Ireland title, their first in sixteen championship seasons.

Mayo's Michael Fitzmaurice was the championship's top scorer with 0–32. Cork's Teddy McCarthy was the choice for Texaco Footballer of the Year.

== Results ==
=== Connacht Senior Football Championship ===
Quarter-finals

4 June 1989 Quarter-final	London	1–7 – 3–12	Galway	Emerald GAA Grounds, Ruislip
	B McCabe 1–0, E Lynch 0–3, T McGuinness 0–2, D Daly 0–1, T McDermott 0–1.		D Tummon 1–2, G McManus 0–5, J Joyce 1–0, T McHugh 1–0, M Gavin 0–2, K Walsh 0–1, M Brennan 0–1, E Elwood 0–1.	Referee: E Neary (Sligo)

11 June 1989 Quarter-final	Sligo	1–11 – 1–6	Leitrim	Corran Park, Ballymote
	D McDonagh 0–5, E Deignan 1–1, P Seevers 0–3, J Kent 0–1, F Feeney 0–1.		B Breen 1–3, C Mahon 0–2, D Darcy 0–1.	Referee: P Egan (Galway)

Semi-finals

25 June 1989 Semi-final	Galway	1–8 – 1–8	Mayo	Tuam Stadium, Tuam
	G McManus 1–3, M Brennan 0–2, E Elwood 0–1, M Gavin 0–1, A Mulholland 0–1.		M Fitzmaurice 0–4, S Maher 1–0, N Durkin 0–1, L McHale 0–1, A Finnerty 0–1, J Finn 0–1.	Attendance: 10,000; Referee: S Mullaney (Roscommon)

2 July 1989 Semi-final	Roscommon	4–11 – 1–8	Sligo	Dr. Hyde Park, Roscommon
	Earley 2–2, E McManus Jnr 1–2, Glennon 0–4, A McManus 1–0, Donlon 0–2, Kiloran 0–1.		McDonagh 0–6, E Deignan 1–1, E Molloy 0–1.	Referee: J Cosgrove (Meath)

9 July 1989 Semi-final replay	Mayo	2–13 – 1–8	Galway	MacHale Park, Castlebar
	M Fitzmaurice 0–5, L McHale 1–0, A Finnerty 1–0, F Noone 0–2, S Maher 0–2, K McStay 0–1, J Burke 0–1, D Flanagan 0–1, W Padden 0–1.		T Tierney 1–0, J Joyce 0–2, M Brennan 0–2, B O'Donnell 0–1, P Kelly 0–1, D Tummon 0–1, G McManus 0–1.	Attendance: 16,000; Referee: S Mulvanney (Roscommon)

Finals

23 July 1989 Final	Mayo	0–12 – 1–9	Roscommon	MacHale Park, Castlebar
	M Fitzmaurice 0–5, WJ Padden 0–2, K McStay 0–2, TJ Kilgallon 0–1, N Durkin 0–1, D Flanagan 0–1.		V Glennon 1–1, P Eraley 0–2, A McManus 0–2, D Brady 0–1, S Killoran 0–1, J Newton 0–1, J Connaughton 0–1.	Attendance: 20,000; Referee: M Kearins (Sligo)

30 July 1989 Final replay	Roscommon	2–13 – 3–14 (aet)	Mayo	Dr. Hyde Park, Roscommon
	T McManus 2–4, V Glennon 0–4, P Earley 0–2, S Kiloran 0–1, J Newton 0–1, E McManus Jnr 0–1.		M Fitzmaurice 0–5, J Burke 1–1, A Finnerty 1–1, N Durkin 1–0, L McHale 0–3, WJ Padden 0–2, K McStay 0–2.	Referee: M Kearins (Sligo)

=== Leinster Senior Football Championship ===
First round

14 May 1989 First round	Carlow	1–7 – 2–14	Wicklow	Dr. Cullen Park, Carlow
	J Nevin 1–3, D Ware 0–1, P Tobin 0–1, T O'Brien 0–1, J Hayden 0–1.		K O'Brien 1–3, P Baker 0–6, P Kenny 1–1, S O'Brien 0–2, A O'Sullivan 0–2.	Attendance: 4,500

14 May 1989 First round	Louth	3–7 – 2–9	Laois	Drogheda Park, Drogheda
	S White 2–1, R Culhane 1–0, C Kelly 0–3, S O'Hanlon 0–2, N Browne 0–1.		W Brennan 1–4, S Murphy 1–0, G Browne 0–2, G Lawlor 0–2, D Lalor 0–1.	Referee: S Aldridge (Kildare)

21 May 1989 First round	Westmeath	3–9 – 1–7	Wexford	Cusack Park, Mullingar
	J Fleming 1–5, J Whelehan 1–1, T Ormsby 1–0, P Hassett 0–2, D Wilson 0–1.		B Dodd 0–5, L Rafter 1–1, M Hanrick 0–1.	Referee: J Woods (Dublin)

Quarter-finals

4 June 1989 Quarter-final	Wicklow	1–15 – 2–9	Longford	Aughrim Park, Aughrim
	P Baker 0–9, K O'Brien 0–4, A O'Sullivan 1–0, P O'Byrne 0–1, F Daly 0–1.		D Barry 1–4, M O'Hara 1–1, L O'Rourke 0–3, K Smith 0–1.	Referee: K Campbell (Meath)

5 June 1989 Quarter-final	Dublin	1–13 – 1–9	Kildare	St. Conleth's Park, Newbridge
	B Rock 0–8, K Duff 1–2, D Foran 0–1, P Clarke 0–1, T Carr 0–1.		L Miley 1–1, P McLoughlin 0–4, J Gilroy 0–1, D Fennin 0–1, T Harris 0–1, B Dowling 0–1.	Referee: P Moran (Laois)

11 June 1989 Quarter-final	Meath	1–15 – 0–13	Louth	Croke Park, Dublin
	B Stafford 0–7, F Murtagh 0–4, L Hayes 1–0, C Coyle 0–2, C O'Rourke 0–1, M O'Connell 0–1.		C Kelly 0–6, S White 0–4, P Butterly 0–2, B Kerins 0–1.	Attendance: 20,000; Referee: D Guerin (Dublin)

11 June 1989 Quarter-final	Offaly	1–8 – 1–6	Westmeath	O'Connor Park, Tullamore
	S Lynam 0–4, B Lowry 1–0, V Claffey 0–1, P Brady 0–1, V Byrne 0–1, J Stewart 0–1.		J Fleming 0–5, J Whelehan 1–0, D Wilson 0–1.	Referee: T Meagher (Laois)

Semi-finals

25 June 1989 Semi-final	Dublin	1–12 – 1–6	Wicklow	St. Conleth's Park, Newbridge
	B Rock 0–5, J McNally 1–0, M Galvin 0–3, V Murphy 0–2, T Carr 0–1, D Foran 0–1.		M Murtagh 1–0, P Baker 0–3, A O'Sullivan 0–1, K O'Brien 0–1, P O'Byrne 0–1.	Referee: P Collins (Westmeath)

2 July 1989 Semi-final	Meath	3–11 – 0–9	Offaly	Croke Park, Dublin
	B Stafford 1–7, C O'Rourke 2–0, R Flynn 0–2, L Hayes 0–1, C Coyle 0–1.		P Brady 0–2, V Byrne 0–2, S Lynam 0–2, P Moran 0–1, D Kavanagh 0–1, M Plunkett 0–1.	Attendance: 16,652; Referee: S Kelly (Carlow)

Final

30 July 1989 Final	Dublin	2–12 – 1–10	Meath	Croke Park, Dublin
	V Murphy 1–2, K Duff 1–2, B Rock 0–5, P Curran 0–2, J McNally 0–1.		B Stafford 0–5, B Flynn 0–4, M McCabe 1–0, C O'Rourke 0–1.	Attendance: 56,839; Referee: S Kelly (Carlow)

=== Munster Senior Football Championship ===
Quarter-finals

14 May 1989 Quarter-final	Tipperary	1–18 – 2–5	Clare	Ned Hall Park, Clonmel
	J Costello 0–8, E Maher 0–4, A Cross 1–0, J O'Meara 0–3, B Burke 0–1, R Morris 0–1, G McGrath 0–1.		A O'Keeffe 1–2, F McInerney 1–0, G Killeen 0–1, J Roche 0–1, T O'Neill 0–1.	Referee: JJ Landers (Waterford)

14 May 1989 Quarter-final	Limerick	5–9 – 1–9	Waterford	Páirc na nGael, Askeaton
	E Sheehan 4–3, F Ryan 1–1, T Cummins 0–3, T Quaid 0–1, N Leonard 0–1.		J McGrath 1–1, T Corcoran 0–2, L Dalton 0–2, M Walsh 0–1, J Maher 0–1, E O'Brien 0–1, M Neville 0–1.	Referee: T Sugrue (Kerry)

Semi-finals

18 June 1989 Semi-final	Limerick	1–10 – 6–7	Kerry	Páirc na nGael, Askeaton
	T Cummins 1–2, E Sheehan 0–4, S Gleeson 0–3, D Fitzgibbon 0–1.		M Fitzgerald 1–2, T Fleming 1–2, E Liston 1–1, T Spillane 1–0, M McAuliffe 1–0, W Maher 1–0, P Spillane 0–2.

25 June 1989 Semi-final	Cork	0–22 – 0–6	Tipperary	Páirc Uí Chaoimh, Cork
	L Tompkins 0–7, D Barry 0–3, P McGrath 0–3, J Cleary 0–3, M McCarthy 0–2, D Walsh 0–1, D Allen 0–1, B Coffey 0–1, E O'Mahony 0–1.		J O'Meara 0–4, E Maher 0–1, J Costelloe 0–1.	Referee: P Lane (Limerick)

Final

23 July 1989 Final	Kerry	1–9 – 1–12	Cork	Fitzgerald Stadium, Killarney
	M Fitzgerald 0–6, A O'Donovan 1–0, P Spillane 0–2, E Liston 0–1.		L Tompkins 0–7, J O'Driscoll 1–1, P McGrath 0–2, D Allen 0–1, J Cleary 0–1.	Attendance: 47,011; Referee: P Russell (Tipperary)

=== Ulster Senior Football Championship ===
Preliminary round

14 May 1989 Preliminary round	Antrim	0–5 – 0–8	Monaghan	Casement Park, Belfast
	C O'Neill 0–1, A McQuillan 0–1, T Connolly 0–1, M Darragh 0–1, D Finnegan 0–1.		R McCarron 0–4, G McCarville 0–1, E Hughes 0–1, E McEneaney 0–1, F McEneaney 0–1.	Attendance: 10,000; Referee: J Curran (Tyrone)

Quarter-finals

21 May 1989 Quarter-final	Cavan	0–14 – 3–11	Donegal	Breffni Park, Cavan
	R Carolan 0–8, P Fallon 0–1, S Pierson 0–1, N O'Donnell 0–1, B McArdle 0–1, V Dowd 0–1, D Brady 0–1.		J McMullen 2–1, T Ryan 1–3, M Hughes 0–6, B Murray 0–1.	Attendance: 12,000

28 May 1989 Quarter-final	Fermanagh	1–7 – 4–15	Derry	St. Molaise Park, Irvinestown
	B Carthy 1–3, C Curran 0–1, F McCann 0–1, M O'Rourke 0–1, J Leonard 0–1.		B McGilligan 2–0, D Barton 1–3, E Gormley 1–3, D Cassidy 0–5, B Healy 0–2, A Quigg 0–1, P Murphy 0–1.	Attendance: 4,000; Referee: M Cranny (Down)

4 June 1989 Quarter-final	Tyrone	1–11 – 2–7	Armagh	Healy Park, Omagh
	K McCabe 0–9, C Corr 1–1, P Quinn 0–1.		K McGurk 1–1, S Skelton 1–1, J McConville 0–3, N Smyth 0–1, B Canavan 0–1.	Referee: M Greenan (Cavan)

11 June 1989 Quarter-final	Monaghan	0–9 – 1–14	Down	St. Mary's Park, Castleblayney
	E McEneaney 0–4, G McGurk 0–2, O Hamilton 0–1, G McCarville 0–1, E Sherry 0–1.		L Heaney 1–2, C Murray 0–3, J Treanor 0–3, M Linden 0–2, C Deegan 0–1, A Rodgers 0–1, G Blaney 0–1, DJ Kane 0–1.	Referee: D Campbell (Fermanagh)

Semi-finals

18 June 1989 Semi-final	Donegal	2–8 – 1–9	Derry	St. Tiernach's Park, Clones
	M McHugh 2–2, J McMullan 0–2, T Ryan 0–1, B Murray 0–1, M Shovlin 0–1, M Gallagher 0–1.		E Gormley 1–3, D Barton 0–3, P Murphy 0–1, B Keeley 0–1, D Cassidy 0–1.	Referee: J Curran (Tyrone)

25 June 1989 Semi-final	Tyrone	1–12 – 1–7	Down	St. Mary's Park, Castleblayney
	S Conway 0–6, D O'Hagan 1–1, H McClure 0–2, C Dorr 0–2, M McClure 0–1.		J Treanor 1–2, A Rodgers 0–2, M Linden 0–1, K Smyth 0–1, R Carr 0–1.	Attendance: 13,000; Referee: J Gough (Antrim)

Finals

16 July 1989 Final	Donegal	0–11 – 0–11	Tyrone	St. Tiernach's Park, Clones
	M McHugh 0–4, J McMullan 0–2, C Mulgrew 0–2, T Ryan 0–1, B Murray 0–1, A Molloy 0–1.		S Conway 0–4, C Corr 0–3, K McCabe 0–2, E McKenna 0–1, D O'Hagan 0–1.	Attendance: 30,000; Referee: M Greenan (Cavan)

23 July 1989 Final replay	Donegal	0–7 – 2–13	Tyrone	St. Tiernach's Park, Clones
	M McHugh 0–4, T Ryan 0–2, L McGettigan 0–1.		S Conway 1–3, D O'Hagan 1–0, E McKenna 0–3, K McCabe 0–2, S Meyler 0–2, S McNally 0–2, C Corr 0–1.	Attendance: 25,000; Referee: M Greenan (Cavan)

=== All-Ireland Senior Football Championship ===
Semi-finals

13 August 1989 Semi-final	Mayo	0–12 – 1–6	Tyrone	Croke Park, Dublin
	M Fitzmaurice 0–6, N Durkin 0–1, K McStay 0–1, B Kilkenny 0–1, D Flanagan 0–1, S Maher 0–1, L McHale 0–1.		S Conway 0–4, E McKenna 1–0, H McClure 0–1, D O'Hagan 0–1.	Attendance: 48,177; Referee: S Aldridge (Kildare)

20 August 1989 Semi-final	Cork	2–10 – 1–9	Dublin	Croke Park, Dublin
	J Cleary 2–0, L Tompkins 0–3, D Barry 0–2, D Allen 0–2, D O'Driscoll 0–1, P McGrath 0–1, T McCarthy 0–1.		B Rock 0–5, V Murphy 1–1, P Clarke 0–2, P Curran 0–1.	Attendance: 60,168; Referee: M Kearins (Sligo)

Final

17 September 1989 Final	Cork	0–17 – 1–11	Mayo	Croke Park, Dublin
	L Tompkins 0–4, P McGrath 0–3, J Cleary 0–3, D Barry 0–3, T McCarthy 0–2, M McCarthy 0–2.		M Fitzmaurice 0–7, A Finnerty 1–0, K McStay 0–2, L McHale 0–1, WJ Padden 0–1.	Attendance: 65,519; Referee: P Collins (Westmeath)

== Championship statistics ==
=== Miscellaneous ===
- On 11 June 1989, Corran Park in Ballymote hosts its first championship game in 36 years. That defeat of Leitrim by Sligo is their first championship victory over the team in 15 years.
- Both the Connacht and Ulster finals ended in draws and went to replays for the first time since 1976.
- Cork win the Munster title for the third year in succession. It is the first time in their history that they achieve the three-in-a-row.
- The All Ireland semi-finals the Mayo vs Tyrone game was the first championship meeting between the teams while the other had between Cork vs Dublin was Cork's first championship win over Dublin.
- The All-Ireland final between Cork and Mayo is their first championship meeting since the 1916 All-Ireland semi-final. It is Mayo's first appearance in an All-Ireland final in 38 years.

=== Top scorers ===
Overall

Rank	Player	County	Tally	Total	Matches	Average
1	Michael Fitzmaurice	Mayo	0–32	32	6	5.33
2	Barney Rock	Dublin	0–23	23	4	5.75
3	Brian Stafford	Meath	1–19	22	3	7.33
4	Larry Tompkins	Cork	0–21	21	4	5.25
5	Stephen Conway	Tyrone	1–17	20	5	4.00

Single game

Rank	Player	County	Tally	Total	Opposition
1	Eoin Sheehan	Limerick	4–3	15	Waterford
2	Tony McManus	Roscommon	2–4	10	Mayo
2	Brian Stafford	Meath	1–7	10	Offaly
4	Pat Baker	Wicklow	0–9	9	Longford
4	Kevin McCabe	Tyrone	0–9	9	Armagh
6	Paul Earley	Roscommon	2–2	8	Sligo
6	Martin McHugh	Donegal	2–2	8	Derry
6	John Fleming	Westmeath	1–5	8	Wexford
6	John Costello	Tipperary	0–8	8	Clare
6	Ronan Carolan	Cavan	0–8	8	Donegal
