= 1988–89 National Football League (Ireland) =

Gaelic football competition

League details
- Dates: October 1988 – 14 May 1989

League champions
- Winners: Cork (4th win)
- Captain: Tony Nation

League runners-up
- Runners-up: Dublin
- Captain: P. Dunne

The 1988–89 National Football League, known for sponsorship reasons as the Royal Liver National Football League, was the 58th staging of the National Football League (NFL), an annual Gaelic football tournament for the Gaelic Athletic Association county teams of Ireland.

Cork beat Dublin in the "home" final and went on to win the two-legged final against New York. Colman Corrigan was injured in New York and so missed the All-Ireland championship.

== Format ==
=== Divisions ===
- Division One: 8 teams
- Division Two: 8 teams
- Division Three: 16 teams. Split into two regional groups of 8 (North and South)

=== Round-robin format ===
Each team played every other team in its division (or group where the division is split) once, either home or away.

=== Points awarded ===
2 points were awarded for a win and 1 for a draw.

=== Titles ===
Teams in all three divisions competed for the National Football League title.

=== Knockout stage qualifiers ===
- Division One: top 4 teams
- Division Two: top 2 teams
- Division Three (North): group winners
- Division Three (South): group winners

=== Knockout phase structure ===
In the quarter-finals, the match-ups were as follows:

- Quarter-final 1: First-placed team in Division One v First-placed team in Division Three (South)
- Quarter-final 2: Second-placed team in Division One v First-placed team in Division Three (North)
- Quarter-final 3: Third-placed team in Division One v Second-placed team in Division Two
- Quarter-final 4: Fourth-placed team in Division One v First-placed team in Division Two

The semi-final match-ups are:

- Semi-final 1: Winner Quarter-final 1 v Winner Quarter-final 4
- Semi-final 2: Winner Quarter-final 2 v Winner Quarter-final 3

The final match-up is: Winner Semi-final 1 v Winner Semi-final 2.

=== Promotion and relegation ===
- Division One: bottom 2 teams demoted to Division Two
- Division Two: top 2 teams promoted to Division One. Bottom 3 teams demoted to Division Three.
- Division Three (North): group winners promoted to Division Two. Group runners up play-off for the third promotion slot from Division Three.
- Division Three (South): group winners promoted to Division Two. Group runners up play-off for the third promotion slot from Division Three.

=== Separation of teams on equal points ===
In the event that teams finish on equal points, then a play-off will be used to determine group placings if necessary, i.e. where to decide relegation places or quarter-finalists.

== League Tables ==
=== Division One ===
Team	Pld	W	D	L	Pts	Status
Dublin	7	5	0	2	10	Advance to quarter-finals
Kerry	7	5	0	2	10	Advance to quarter-finals
Derry	7	4	1	2	9	Advance to quarter-finals
Armagh	7	4	0	3	8	Advance to quarter-finals
Down	7	3	1	3	7
Donegal	7	3	0	4	6
Monaghan	7	3	0	4	6	Relegated to Division Two of the 1989–90 NFL
Meath	7	1	0	6	2	Relegated to Division Two of the 1989–90 NFL

=== Division Two ===
Team	Pld	W	D	L	Pts	Status
Cork	7	5	1	1	11	Promoted to Division One of the 1989–90 NFL and advance to quarter-finals
Cavan	7	5	1	1	11	Promoted to Division One of the 1989–90 NFL and advance to quarter-finals
Mayo	7	4	1	2	9
Roscommon	7	3	2	2	8
Louth	7	3	2	2	8
Kildare	7	2	1	4	5	Relegated to Division Three of the 1989–90 NFL
Galway	7	1	2	4	4	Relegated to Division Three of the 1989–90 NFL
Longford	7	0	0	7	0	Relegated to Division Three of the 1989–90 NFL

=== Division Three ===
==== Division Three (North) play-offs ====
19 March 1989 For 2nd Place	Tyrone	2-9 — 1-5	Leitrim	Brewster Park, Enniskillen

==== Division Three (South) play-offs ====
19 March 1989 For 1st Place	Wexford	1-7 — 0-8	Limerick	Clonmel

==== Division Three promotion play-off ====
16 April 1989	Tyrone	1-7 — 1-6	Limerick	Roscommon

==== Division Three (North) table ====
Team	Pld	W	D	L	Pts	Status
Antrim	7	5	2	0	12	Advance to quarter-finals; Promoted to Division Two of the 1989–90 NFL
Tyrone	7	4	2	1	10	Promoted to Division Two of the 1989–90 NFL
Leitrim	7	5	0	2	10
Laois	7	4	1	2	9
Offaly	7	4	1	2	9
Sligo	7	2	0	5	4
Fermanagh	7	1	0	6	2
Westmeath	7	0	0	7	0

==== Division Three (South) table ====
Team	Pld	W	D	L	Pts	Status
Wexford	7	6	0	1	12	Advance to quarter-finals; Promoted to Division Two of the 1989–90 NFL
Limerick	7	6	0	1	12
Waterford	7	5	0	2	10
Clare	7	4	0	3	8
Tipperary	7	3	1	3	7
Wicklow	7	2	1	4	5
Carlow	7	1	0	6	2
Kilkenny	7	0	0	7	0

== Knockout stages ==
=== Quarter-finals ===
19 March 1989

Cavan	2-9 – 1-5	Derry

Croke Park, Dublin

26 March 1989

Cork	0-12 – 1-5	Armagh

Croke Park, Dublin

26 March 1989

Kerry	3-10 – 1-9	Antrim

Croke Park, Dublin

26 March 1989

Dublin	1-11 – 0-7	Wexford

Portlaoise

=== Semi-finals ===
9 April 1989

Cork	0-10 – 0-4	Kerry

Páirc Uí Chaoimh, Cork
9 April 1989

Dublin	1-10 – 1-9	Cavan

Croke Park, Dublin

=== Final ===
23 April 1989
Home Final

Cork	0-15 – 0-12	Dublin

Croke Park, Dublin
