= Mick Ellard =

Irish sports journalist (1946–2022)

- Born: Michael Ellard; 1946; Cork, Ireland
- Died: 19 November 2022 (aged 76); Cork, Ireland
- Education: The North Monastery
- Occupation: Sports journalist
- Employer: Irish Examiner

Michael Ellard (1946 – 19 November 2022) was an Irish sports journalist who wrote for the Irish Examiner.

== Career ==
Ellard was educated at the North Monastery where he was included on the school's Harty Cup team. He later joined the Na Piarsaigh club and won two City JFC titles before winning a Cork JFC title in 1965. That same year, Ellard was part of the Cork under-21 football team that reached the All-Ireland final. He won a Cork IFC with Na Piarsaigh in 1966.

Ellard's career as a journalist put an end to his playing career after he followed in his father's footsteps and joined the Cork Examiner. He initially began writing about a variety of subjects before spending over 40 years as a Gaelic games correspondent. Ellard won a GAA McNamee Award for his tribute to Na Piarsaigh player Tony Hegarty in 2003. His final submission came in the 10 May 2010 issue of the Irish Examiner.

== Death ==
Ellard died at the Mater Private Hospital in Cork on 19 November 2022, at the age of 76.

== Honours ==
Na Piarsaigh

- Cork Intermediate Football Championship: 1966
- Cork Junior Football Championship: 1965
- City Junior Football Championship: 1964, 1965

Cork

- Munster Under-21 Football Championship: 1965
