= Bob Honohan =

Irish Gaelic football coach, selector and former player

Bon Honohan
Personal information
- Born: 1940 (age 85–86) Donoughmore, County Cork, Ireland
- Occupation: Secondary school teacher

Sport
- Sport: Gaelic football
- Position: Centre-forward
Clubs
- Years: Club
- Donoughmore; Mitchelstown → Avondhu; Ballygiblin
Club titles
- Cork titles: 0
Club management
- Years: Club
- Bishopstown
Inter-county management
- Years: Team
- Cork senior football team Cork under-21 football team Cork minor football team
Inter-county titles as manager
County	League	Province	All-Ireland
Cork (SF) Cork (U21) Cork (MF)	2; 6; 0	4; 8; 2	4; 8; 2

Robert P. Honohan (born 1940) is an Irish Gaelic football coach, selector and former player. At club he played with Donoughmore and Mitchelstown, divisional side Avondhu and at inter-county level with the Cork minor and junior teams. In a lengthy coaching career, Honohan has had All-Ireland successes at different inter-county levels.

== Playing career ==
Honohan began his club career with Donoughmore before transferring to the Mitchelstown club after taking a teaching post in the town. He was at centre-forward when his adopted club won the 1965 Cork IFC title after beating St. Vincent's in the final. Honohan enjoyed further success by winning three North Cork JAFC titles in five seasons between 1969 and 1973. His performances at club level earned his inclusion on the Avondhu divisional team, while he also played hurling with the Ballygiblin club.

Honohan first appeared on the inter-county scene with Cork during an unsuccessful two-year stint with the minor team in 1957 and 1958. He was subsequently drafted onto the junior team and came on as a substitute when Cork beat London in the 1964 All-Ireland junior final. Honohan later captained the junior team to a second Munster JFC title in three years before losing the 1966 All-Ireland junior final to London.

== Coaching career ==
Honohan first became involved in inter-county management when he was appointed coach of the Cork under-21 team in 1979. He held the position for 11 years, during which time he guided Cork to six All-Ireland U21FC titles. Honohan combined this role with that of selector to the senior team that won the National League title in 1980 and the Munster SFC title in 1983. He also coached the Cork minor team that lost consecutive All-Ireland minor finals in 1986 and 1987.

Honohan was recalled as a senior team selector in 1988. The following three years saw Cork win three successive Munster SFC titles, a National League title and consecutive All-Ireland SFC titles in 1989 and 1990. After stepping away from the senior team, Honohan later returned as under-21 team coach on two occasions. He also served as Cork's delegate on the GAA's Central Council.

== Honours ==
=== Player ===
Mitchelstown

- Cork Intermediate Football Championship: 1965
- North Cork Junior A Football Championship: 1969, 1972, 1973

Cork

- All-Ireland Junior Football Championship: 1964
- Munster Junior Football Championship: 1964, 1966 (c)

=== Management ===
Cork

- All-Ireland Senior Football Championship: 1989, 1990
- Munster Senior Football Championship: 1983, 1988, 1989, 1990
- National Football Leagie: 1979-80, 1988-89
- All-Ireland Under-21 Football Championship: 1980, 1981, 1984, 1985, 1986, 1989
- Munster Under-21 Football Championship: 1979, 1980, 1981, 1982, 1984, 1985, 1986, 1989
- Munster Minor Football Championship: 1986, 1987
