= 1966 All-Ireland Junior Football Championship =

Gaelic football competition for junior teams

All Ireland Champions
- Winners: London (2nd win)
- Captain: Noel O'Reilly

All Ireland Runners-up
- Runners-up: Cork
- Captain: Donal Sheehan

Provincial Champions
- Munster: Cork
- Leinster: Louth
- Ulster: Down
- Connacht: Galway

The 1966 All-Ireland Junior Football Championship was the 45th staging of the All-Ireland Junior Championship since its establishment by the Gaelic Athletic Association in 1912.

Galway entered the championship as defending champions, however, they were beaten by Down in the All-Ireland semi-final.

The All-Ireland final was played on 23 October 1966 at the Gaelic Grounds in Limerick, between London and Cork, in what was their second ever meeting in the final. London won the match by 1–06 to 0–08 to claim their second championship title overall and a first tile in 28 years.

== Results ==
=== Leinster Junior Football Championship ===
10 August 1966 Final (After Extra-time)	Louth	3-14 - 3-12	Kildare	Croke Park
	Lynch (1-6), Nugent (1-2), Duff (1-2), Judge (0-3), McCarthy (0-1)		J. Kane (1-9), Gleeson (1-2), Dillon (1-0), Conway (0-1)	Referee: K. Kenworthy (Dublin)

GK	1	Dickie Kieran (St Kevin's)
RCB	2	Dermot Drumgoole (St Joseph's)
FB	3	Séamus Kirk (St Bride's)
LCB	4	Jim Mooney (Naomh Máirtín)
RHB	5	Benny Grogan (St Kevin's)
CHB	6	Larry Geraghty (Mattock Rangers)
LHB	7	Joe Gogarty (Geraldines)
MF	8	Donal Matthews (Mattock Rangers)
MF	9	Ollie Geraghty (Mattock Rangers)
RHF	10	Harry McCarthy (Cooley Kickhams)
CHF	11	Kevin Lynch (Geraldines)
LHF	12	Peter Shevlin (Naomh Fionnbarra)
RCF	13	Danny Nugent (Newtown Blues)
FF	14	Jim Judge (Newtown Blues)
LCF	15	Patrick Duff (St Fechin's) (c)
Substitutes:
	16	Peter Donnelly (Stabannon Parnells) for Grogan
	17	Derry Maguire (St Bride's) for Shevlin
	18	Peter Shevlin for O. Geraghty
	19	Gerry McFadden (O'Connells) for Gogarty
	20	Liam Smith (Wolfe Tones) for Matthews
	21	Paddy McGlew (St Fechin's) for Mooney

GK	1	Willie Hennessy (Ballymore)
RCB	2	Tom Kane (Sallins)
FB	3	Tom Foley (Rheban)
LCB	4	Willie Harris (Rheban)
RHB	5	J.J. Cahill (Eadestown)
CHB	6	John Murphy (Milltown)
LHB	7	Seán Brennan (Ballyteague)
MF	8	John Kane (Sallins)
MF	9	Pat Brereton (Ballykelly)
RHF	10	Jimmy Dalton (Sallins)
CHF	11	Mick Nugent (Ballyteague)
LHF	12	John Donoghue (Grange)
RCF	13	Ollie Harrington (Ardclough)
FF	14	Jim Dillon (Suncroft)
LCF	15	Liam Gleeson (Monasterevan)
Substitute:
	16	Paddy Conway (Ballymore) for Harrington

=== All-Ireland Junior Football Championship ===
==== All-Ireland semi-finals ====
14 August 1966	Cork	0-10 - 0-06	Louth	Cork Athletic Grounds
	T. Bourke (0-5), Sheehan (0-1), Kelleher (0-1), White (0-1), Evans (0-1), Roche (0-1)		Lynch (0-3), McCarthy (0-2), Nugent (0-1)

GK	1	George McCarthy (St Finbarr's)
RCB	2	Johnny O'Flynn (Kilshannig)
FB	3	Tom Bermingham (Grange)
LCB	4	Andy Burke (Bandon)
RHB	5	Johnny O'Leary (Nemo Rangers)
CHB	6	John O'Halloran (UCC)
LHB	7	Mick Healy (St Finbarr's)
MF	8	Jim Downing (Urhan)
MF	9	Donal Sheehan (Na Piarsaigh)
RHF	10	Tommy Burke (Millstreet)
CHF	11	John Murphy (Douglas)
LHF	12	Con Roche (St Finbarr's)
RCF	13	Con Kelleher (Millstreet)
FF	14	Bob Honohan (Mitchelstown)
LCF	15	John White (Nemo Rangers)
Substitutes:
	16	Denis McCarthy (Kilmurry) for Murphy
	17	Robert Evans (O'Donovan Rossa) for Downing

GK	1	Dickie Kieran (St Kevin's)
RCB	2	Dermot Drumgoole (St Joseph's)
FB	3	Séamus Kirk (St Bride's)
LCB	4	Jim Mooney (Naomh Máirtin)
RHB	5	Peter Donnelly (Stabannon Parnells)
CHB	6	Larry Geraghty (Mattock Rangers)
LHB	7	Gerry McFadden (O'Connells)
MF	8	Benny Grogan (St Kevin's)
MF	9	Ollie Geraghty (Mattock Rangers)
RHF	10	Harry McCarthy (Cooley Kickhams)
CHF	11	Kevin Lynch (Geraldines)
LHF	12	Peter Shevlin (Naomh Fionnbarra)
RCF	13	Danny Nugent (Newtown Blues)
FF	14	Jim Judge (Newtown Blues)
LCF	15	Patrick Duff (St Fechin's) (c)
Substitutes:
	16	Danny Culligan (St Joseph's) for Kirk
	17	Gerry Kelly (St Bride's) for Drumgoole
	18	Donal Matthews (Mattock Rangers) for Grogan

14 August 1966	Down	0-10 - 1-04	Galway	Páirc Esler

==== All-Ireland home final ====
11 September 1966 Home final	Cork	2-12 - 0-10	Down	Croke Park

==== All-Ireland final ====
23 October 1966 Final	London	1-06 - 0-08	Cork	Gaelic Grounds
				Referee: T. Cunningham (Galway)

== See also ==
- Leinster Junior Football Championship
- All-Ireland Junior Football Championship
