= Niall O'Connor (Gaelic footballer) =

Cork Gaelic footballer

Personal information
- Native name: Niall Ó Conchubhair (Irish)
- Born: 1960 (age 65–66) Knocknagree, County Cork, Ireland
- Occupation: Telecom technician
- Height: 5 ft 10 in (178 cm)

Sport
- Sport: Gaelic football
- Position: Right corner-back
Clubs
Years	Club	Apps (scores)
1978–2003 1979–1996	Knocknagree → Duhallow	45 (11–135)
Club titles
- Cork titles: 2
Inter-county
Years	County	Apps (scores)
1981-1982	Cork	1 (0-00)
Inter-county titles
- Munster titles: 0
- All-Irelands: 0
- NFL: 0
- All Stars: 0

Niall O'Connor (born 1960) is an Irish former Gaelic footballer. At club level he played with Knocknagree, divisional side Duhallow and at inter-county level with the Cork senior football team.

== Career ==
O'Connor's first Gaelic football successes came as a schoolboy at Rathmore Vocational School. During his time there he won an All-Ireland schools' title in 1978, while he was also a member of the Kerry inter-county vocational schools' team that won consecutive All-Ireland titles. O'Connor also joined the Knocknagree adult club team around this time and won the first of nine Duhallow JAFC titles in 1978. He also won Cork JAFC titles in 1984 and 1991. O'Connor's performances at club level saw him join the Duhallow divisional team and he won consecutive Cork SFC titles in 1990 and 1991.

O'Connor first appeared on the inter-county scene with Cork as full-forward on the under-21 team that won consecutive All-Ireland U21FC titles in 1980 and 1981. These successes saw him drafted onto the senior team and he was a member of the panel when Cork were beaten by Kerry in the 1982 Munster final. O'Connor later linked up with the junior team and won All-Ireland JFC titles in 1984 and 1989, while also serving as team captain.

== Honours ==
Rathmore Vocational School

- All-Ireland Vocational Schools Football Championship: 1978

Kerry Vocational Schools

- All-Ireland Vocational Schools Football Championship: 1977, 1978

Knocknagree

- Cork Junior A Football Championship: 1984, 1991
- Duhallow Junior A Football Championship: 1978, 1979, 1981, 1982, 1983, 1984, 1989, 1990, 1991

Duhallow

- Cork Senior Football Championship: 1990, 1991

Cork

- All-Ireland Junior Football Championship: 1984, 1989
- Munster Junior Football Championship: 1984, 1989, 1992
- All-Ireland Under-21 Football Championship: 1980, 1981
- Munster Under-21 Football Championship: 1980, 1981
