= 1991 Cork Senior Football Championship =

Gaelic football competition

- Dates: 20 April – 6 October 1991
- Teams: 21
- Champions: Duhallow (3rd title); Danny Culloty (captain); Ger O Sullivan (manager)
- Runners-up: St. Finbarr's; John Kerins (captain); John Allen (manager)

Tournament statistics
- Matches played: 24
- Goals scored: 60 (2.5 per match)
- Points scored: 411 (17.13 per match)
- Top scorer(s): Maurice Fitzgerald (2-16)

The 1991 Cork Senior Football Championship was the 103rd staging of the Cork Senior Football Championship since its establishment by the Cork County Board in 1887. The draw for the opening fixtures took place on 16 December 1990. The championship ran from 20 April to 6 October 1991.

Duhallow entered the championship as the defending champions.

The final was played on 6 October 1991 at Páirc Uí Chaoimh in Cork, between Duhallow and St. Finbarr's, in what was their third ever meeting in the final and their second meeting in succession. Duhallow won the match by 0–11 to 0–10 to claim their third championship title overall and a second title in succession.

University College Cork's Maurice Fitzgerald was the championship's top scorer with 2–16.

== Team changes ==
=== To Championship ===
Promoted from the Cork Intermediate Football Championship

- Macroom

=== From Championship ===
Regraded to the Cork Intermediate Football Championship

- Rockchapel

== Results ==
=== First round ===
20 April 1991 First round	Muskerry	3-07 - 3-11	University College Cork	Ballincollig Grounds
	D Lynch 2-3, J O'Driscoll 1-1, C O'Callaghan 0-1, K Creed 0-1, C O'Connell 0-1.		M Fitzgerald 1-6, B Horgan 1-0, F Keohane 1-0, A Kelly 0-2, C Collins 0-1, C O'Dwyer 0-1, T Queally 0-1.

20 April 1991 First round	Bishopstown	0-03 - 0-11	Carbery	Carrigadrohid Grounds
	M McGrath 0-1, L Meaney 0-1, L Honohan 0-1.		B Harte 0-6, J Whooley 0-2, T Crowley 0-1, M O'Connor 0-1, P Kenneally 0-1.

21 April 1991 First round	Seandún	0-06 - 0-10	Beara	Aughaville Grunds
	B Harrington 0-2, K O'Brien 0-2, K O'Sullivan 0-1, K O'Neill 0-1.		C O'Sullivan 0-3, M Harrington 0-3, N Murphy 0-1, O O'Sullivan 0-1, Martin O'Sullivan 0-1, G O'Sullivan 0-1.	Referee: M Collins (Clonakilty)

27 April 1991 First round	O'Donovan Rossa	1-08 - 2-05	Na Piarsaigh	Charlie Hurley Park
	P Davis 1-1, M McCarthy 0-3, J Brady 0-2, J O'Driscoll 0-1, B O'Donovan 0-1.		J O'Driscoll 1-0, B O'Donovan 1-0, R McDonnell 0-2, Mick Mullins 0-1, J O'Connell 0-1, T Twomey 0-1.

5 May 1991 First round replay	O'Donovan Rossa	6-10 - 1-08	Na Piarsaigh	Charlie Hurley Park
	M McCarthy 2-3, J Brady 2-1, P Davis 1-2, D O'Donovan 1-0, J O'Driscoll 0-3, T Davis 0-1.		D Sheehan 0-6, C O'Donovan 1-0, J Twomey 0-1, M Mullins 0-1.

12 May 1991 First round	Clonakilty	2-09 - 3-04	Kilshannig	Cloughduv Grounds
	E Ryan 1-1, M de Long 0-4, F Lyons 1-0, T Mannix 0-2, B Sutton 0-1, F O'Mahony 0-1.		W O'Riordan 2-1, P O'Connell 1-1, B O'Sullivan 0-1, D O'Connell 0-1.

=== Second round ===
20 April 1991 Second round	Carrigdhoun	1-06 - 3-08	Nemo Rangers	Manning Park
	S Stack 1-1, A Harrington 0-3, R O'Sullivan 0-1, M Cahalane 0-1.		P O'Donovan 2-0, J Kavanagh 1-3, S O'Brien 0-2, S Fahy 0-2, D Allen 0-1.

21 April 1991 Second round	Macroom	1-04 - 1-10	Imokilly	Páirc Uí Chaoimh
	F Corrigan 1-0, N Twomey 0-2, JJ Murphy 0-2.		J Morgan 0-6, M Lewis 1-1, M Spillane 0-1, D Walsh 0-1, N O'Neill 0-1.

21 April 1991 Second round	St Michael's	2-11 - 1-06	Avondhu	Clonmult Memorial Park
	A Ryan 0-6, I Aherne 1-0, P Kiely 1-0, J Quilter 0-3, G Power 0-1, J Cashman 0-1.		J Barrett 1-0, F Grourke 0-2, P Buckley 0-1, D Twomey 0-1, C O'Sullivan 0-1, J O'Brien 0-1.

19 May 1991 Second round	Duhallow	1-11 - 0-14	University College Cork	Clondrohid Grounds
	D Culloty 1-0, J Dennehy 0-3, A Barry 0-3, J Casey 0-2, N O'Connor 0-2, P Mahony 0-1.		M Fitzgerald 0-5, F Keohane 0-2, D Ahern 0-2, N Donlon 0-2, T O'Connell 0-1, C Collins 0-1, C O'Dwyer 0-1.

24 May 1991 Second round	Glanmire	2-06 - 1-07	Clonakilty	Innishannon Grounds
	G Murphy 1-2, S McElhinney 1-0, M Flynn 0-2, P O'Callaghan 0-1, B O'Callaghan 0-1.		M de Long 1-1, F Lyons 0-2, E Ryan 0-2, F O'Mahony 0-1, B Crowley 0-1.

24 May 1991 Second round	O'Donovan Rossa	1-07 - 3-06	St. Finbarr's	Henry Ford Park
	M McCarthy 1-5, P Davis 0-1, J Brady 0-1.		M Barry 2-1, T Power 1-2, J Costello 0-2, K Scanlon 0-1.

31 May 1991 Second round replay	Duhallow	0-15 - 1-10	University College Cork	Clondrohid Grounds
	J Dennehy 0-5, N O'Connor 0-5, K Linehan 0-2, P O'Connor 0-1, R Dennehy 0-1, D O'Connor 0-1.		M Fitzgerald 1-5, F Keohane 0-2, K Dwyer 0-1, P Ahern 0-1, D Ahern 0-1.

9 June 1991 Second round	Beara	1-09 - 2-13	St. Nicholas'	Sam Maguire Park
	L Coffey 1-0, D Fagan 0-3, K Hendrick 0-2, V Hedderman 0-1, M Brosnan 0-1, J Lynch 0-1, T Mulcahy 0-1.		G O'Sullivan 2-3, M O'Sullivan 0-3, S Spencer 0-2, C O'Sullivan 0-2, C Collins 0-1, M Harrington 0-1, J Power 0-1.

23 June 1991 Second round	Carbery	1-06 - 1-06	Castlehaven	Rossa Park
	B Harte 0-4, P Hodentt 1-0, J Cotter 0-1, P Hegarty 0-1.		J Maguire 1-1, J Cleary 0-4, F Collins 0-1.

30 June 1991 Second round replay	Carbery	1-10 - 0-05	Castlehaven	Rossa Park
	J Cotter 0-5, J Whooley 1-0, B Harte 0-2, B Herlihy 0-2, K Santry 0-1.		F Collins 0-2, J Cleary 0-2, E Cleary 0-1.

=== Quarter-finals ===
22 June 1991 Quarter-final	St. Finbarr's	1-09 - 0-12	Imokilly	Páirc Uí Chaoimh
	K Scanlon 1-2, T Leahy 0-5, J Griffin 0-2.		C O'Neill 0-5, J Morgan 0-3, M Lewis 0-2, B Tynan 0-1, M Spillane 0-1.	Referee: D Casey (Ballyclough)

22 June 1991 Quarter-final	Duhallow	1-11 - 1-04	St. Michael's	Aghinagh Grounds
	N O'Connor 1-4, J Dennehy 0-3, K Linehan 0-2, P O'Connor 0-1, J Walsh 0-1.		D O'Connell 1-1, T Scally 0-1, G Power 0-1, A Ryan 0-1.	Referee: L O'Flynn (Éire Óg)

23 June 1991 Quarter-final	Nemo Rangers	2-12 - 0-05	Glanmire	Páirc Uí Chaoimh
	D O'Sullivan 1-1, J Kavanagh 0-4, D Allen 1-0, S Fahy 0-2, C Corkery 0-2, T Dalton 0-1, J Kerrigan 0-1, S Calnan 0-1.		T McCarthy 0-3, T Murphy 0-1, N Mulvihill 0-1.	Referee: E Porter (Brian Dillons)

30 June 1991 Quarter-final replay	St. Finbarr's	1-13 - 1-09	Imokilly	Riverstown Sportsfield
	T Leahy 0-5, M Barry 1-1, M Comyns 0-3, K Scanlon 0-2, J Griffin 0-1, T Power 0-1.		C O'Neill 0-5, G Morgan 1-1, J Morgan 0-2, M Lewis 0-1.	Referee: D Casey (Ballyclough)

28 July 1991 Quarter-final	Carbery	3-11 - 1-05	Beara	Castletownbere Grounds
	J Whooley 2-3, B Harte 0-4, M Farr 1-0, S Dineen 0-2, F Santry 0-1, P Hegarty 0-1.		F O'Sullivan 1-0, C O'Sullivan 0-3, G O'Sullivan 0-2.	Referee: J O'Leary (Na Piarsaigh)

=== Semi-finals ===
27 July 1991 Semi-final	Duhallow	3-11 - 0-09	Nemo Rangers	Mitchelstown Grounds
	D O'Connor 1-3, N O'Connor 1-1, J Murphy 1-1, J Dennehy 0-3, A Barry 0-2, G Casey 0-1.		J Kavanagh 0-3, C Corkery 0-2, S O'Brien 0-1, T Nation 0-1, T Dalton 0-1, S Calnan 0-1.	Referee: J Motherway

8 September 1991 Semi-final	St. Finbarr's	0-11 - 1-06	Carbery	Clonakilty Grounds
	T Power 0-4, T Leahy 0-3, M Slocum 0-2, C Ryan 0-1, J Costelloe 0-1.		P Goggin 1-1, B Harte 0-4, J Cotter 0-1.

=== Final ===
6 October 1991 Final	Duhallow	0-11 - 0-10	St. Finbarr's	Páirc Uí Chaoimh
	J Dennehy 0-4, N O'Connor 0-3, P Mahoney 0-2, L Dennehy 0-1, D O'Connor 0-1.		T Leahy 0-6, M Barry 0-2, K Scanlon 0-1, T Power 0-1.	Attendance: 9,291; Referee: N Barrett (Carrigtwohill)

== Championship statistics ==
=== Top scorers ===
Overall

Rank	Player	Club	Tally	Total	Matches	Average
1	Maurice Fitzgerald	UCC	2-16	22	3	7.33
2	Niall O'Connor	Duhallow	2-15	21	5	4.20
3	Mick McCarthy	O'Donovan Rossa	3-11	20	3	6.66
3	Barry Harte	Carbery	0-20	20	5	4.00
5	Tony Leahy	St. Finbarr's	0-19	19	4	4.75
6	Jimmy Dennehy	Duhallow	0-18	18	5	3.60
7	Jason Whooley	Carbery	3-05	14	3	4.66
8	Michael Barry	St. Finbarr's	3-04	13	5	2.60
8	Joe Kavanagh	Nemo Rangers	1-10	13	3	4.66
10	Tony Power	St. Finbarr's	1-08	11	5	2.20
10	John Morgan	Imokilly	0-11	11	3	3.66

In a single game

Rank	Player	Club	Tally	Total	Opposition
1	Diarmuid Lynch	Muskerry	2-03	9	UCC
1	Mick McCarthy	O'Donovan Rossa	2-03	9	Na Piarsaigh
1	Gary O'Sullivan	St. Nicholas'	2-03	9	Beara
1	Jason Whooley	Carbery	2-03	9	Beara
1	Maurice Fitzgerald	UCC	1-06	9	Muskerry
6	Mick McCarthy	O'Donovan Rossa	1-05	8	St. Finbarr's
6	Maurice Fitzgerald	UCC	1-05	8	Duhallow
8	John Brady	O'Donovan Rossa	2-01	7	Na Piarsaigh
8	William O'Riordan	Kilshannig	2-01	7	Clonakilty
8	Michael Barry	St. Finbarr's	2-01	7	O'Donovan Rossa
