= Seán Fitzgerald =

Irish Gaelic footballer (born 2000)

Personal information
- Native name: Seán Mac Gearailt (Irish)
- Nickname: Fitzy
- Born: 14 September 2000 (age 26) Galway, Ireland
- Occupation: Primary school teacher

Sport
- Sport: Gaelic football
- Position: Full-back
Inter-county
- Years: County
- 2022–: Galway
- Connacht titles: 4

Seán Fitzgerald (born 14 September 2000) is an Irish Gaelic footballer who plays for the Bearna club and at senior level for the Galway county team. His usual position is as a defender.

Fitzgerald has won two Connacht Senior Football Championship titles on the field of play (2024 and 2025), as well as an additional two off it (2022 and 2023). He won a Connacht Under-20 Football Championship title in 2020, and – later the same year – the All-Ireland Under-20 Football Championship title. Having scoring a goal in the final of the 2022 FBD Insurance Connacht GAA Senior Football Competition, he played in both the 2023 National Football League final and 2024 All-Ireland Senior Football Championship final.

== Playing career ==
Fitzgerald helped Galway's under-20 team win the 2020 All-Ireland Under-20 Football Championship – delayed until December by the impact of the COVID-19 pandemic on Gaelic games.

He began playing for the Galway senior team in 2022. The first match of the year took place against Mayo at the Connacht GAA Air Dome, with Fitzgerald starting and completing the game in the full-back line alongside Jack Glynn and Liam Silke. Playing alongside Cillian McDaid and Silke in the full-back line, he scored a goal in his second game against Roscommon at the same venue, as Galway won the 2022 FBD Insurance Connacht GAA Senior Football Competition. With the 2022 National League done and dusted, Fitzgerald made a belated blood sub appearance in place of Seán Kelly against Derry. He went on to start in the half-back line in the league final loss to Roscommon. However, he did not feature on the field of play in any of Galway's games in the 2022 Connacht Senior Football Championship, which Galway won. Nor did he feature on the field of play in Galway's run to the 2022 All-Ireland Senior Football Championship final, a run which included the infamous onfield brawl with Armagh in the quarter-final.

Fitzgerald moved to the full-back line as a corner-back alongside regular full-back Kelly for the 2023 National League games against Armagh and Kerry as Galway qualified for the Division 1 League final. Galway lost to Mayo, with Fitzgerald playing the entire game as full-back, swapping with Kelly who went to corner-back. However, he did not feature on the field of play in either of Galway's games in the 2023 Connacht Senior Football Championship, which Galway won.

Fitzgerald did, however, go on to become the senior team's starting full-back. He played this role in the opening 2024 National League game against Mayo; with Kelly absent, Fitzgerald was given a torrid time by opponent Aidan O'Shea. He played as full-back in the next three league games, against Roscommon, Tyrone and Derry. Johnny McGrath replaced Fitzgerald at full-back against Monaghan, with Fitzgerald moving to corner-back. Fitzgerald returned to full-back against Dublin and Kerry to see out the league campaign. He was full-back in every game as Galway won the 2024 Connacht Senior Football Championship, though was subbed off towards the end of the final. He was also full-back in the first two games of Galway's 2024 All-Ireland Senior Football Championship Round Robin campaign, against Derry and Westmeath respectively. He was moved to the half-back line for the concluding game, against Arrmagh, as Galway finished second in Group 1 to qualify for a preliminary quarter-final. He then started as full-back in Galway's run to the 2024 All-Ireland Senior Football Championship final; first that preliminary quarter-final, then in what was described as "landmark" victory against Dublin, though he was subbed off towards the end of his team's victory against the then title holders. Full-back as well for the semi-final against Donegal, Fitzgerald was again subbed off in a narrow victory over Jim McGuinness's team, whose loss at this stage of the championship was his first since 2011. Fitzgerald started – and completed – the 2024 All-Ireland Senior Football Championship final, again as full-back.

Galway used Fitzgerald as full-back again during the 2025 Connacht Senior Football Championship. However, he was replaced by Kieran Molloy shortly after the second half of the final began, with Galway winning to complete a run of four consecutive titles for the first time since the 1960s. But Meath surprised Fitzgerald's team by knocking Galway out of the 2025 All-Ireland Senior Football Championship in the quarter-finals.

Fitzgerald started and completed the 2026 Connacht Senior Football Championship semi-final, before leaving the Galway panel ahead of the final to pursue a TV opportunity.

== Personal life ==
Fitzgerald is a qualified primary school teacher.

In June 2026, he was announced as taking part in series 13 of the British reality TV show Love Island.

== Honours ==
Galway

- All-Ireland Senior Football Championship runner-up: 2024
- National Football League runner-up: 2023
- Connacht Senior Football Championship (4): 2022, 2023, 2024, 2025
- FBD Connacht League (1): 2022
- All-Ireland Under-20 Football Championship (1): 2020
- Connacht Under-20 Football Championship (1): 2020
