= Johnny McGrath (Gaelic footballer) =

Johnny McGrath is an Irish Gaelic footballer who plays for the Caherlistrane club and at senior level for the Galway county team. His usual position is as a corner-back. With Seán Fitzgerald and Jack Glynn playing alongside him, he won the 2020 All-Ireland Under-20 Football Championship, and he became the senior team's main man-marker in 2024. That year he gave away only seven points from play or marks in four of the championship games played by Galway.
