= 1974 Cork Senior Hurling Championship =

Annual hurling competition season

- Dates: 14 April – 15 September 1974
- Teams: 18
- Champions: St. Finbarr's (24th title); Jim Power (captain)
- Runners-up: Blackrock; John Horgan (captain)

Tournament statistics
- Matches played: 17
- Goals scored: 87 (5.12 per match)
- Points scored: 345 (20.29 per match)
- Top scorer(s): Willie Glavin (4-14)

The 1974 Cork Senior Hurling Championship was the 86th staging of the Cork Senior Hurling Championship since its establishment by the Cork County Board in 1887. The championship began on 14 April 1974 and ended on 15 September 1974.

Blackrock entered the championship as the defending champions.

The final was played on 15 September 1974 at the Mardyke Grounds in Cork, between St. Finbarr's and Blackrock, in what was their first meeting in the final in three years. St. Finbarr's won the match by 2–17 to 2–14 to claim their 18th championship title overall and a first title in six years.

Imokilly's Willie Glavin was the championship's top scorer with 4–14.

== Team changes ==
=== To Championship ===
Promoted from the Cork Intermediate Hurling Championship

- Cloughduv

=== From Championship ===
Regraded to the Cork Intermediate Hurling Championship

- St. Vincent's

== Results ==
=== First round ===
14 April 1974 First round	Na Piarsaigh	7-07 - 3-10	Passage	Cork Athletic Grounds, Cork
	D Sheehan 4-0, J Gardiner 2-1, S Twomey 0-5, R McDonnell 1-0, T Mullins 0-1.		J O'Reilly 1-2, K Keane 1-1, J O'Reilly 0-4, D Keane 1-0, T Howard 0-1, B Meade 0-1, G O'Sullivan 0-1.

28 April 1974 First round	Mallow	1-16 - 0-08	Seandún	Blarney
	P Buckley 0-11, B Barrett 1-1, P Moriarty 0-1, D Coakley 0-1, F O'Neill 0-1, N O'Regan 0-1.		P O'Sullivan 0-6, T O'Brien 0-1, J Good 0-1.	Referee: D O'Brien (Cobh)

=== Second round ===
26 May 1974 Second round	Sarsfields	0-17 - 3-05	Na Piarsaigh	Cork Athletic Grounds, Cork
	B Murphy 0-4, T Murphy 0-4, J McEvoy 0-3, E Kelleher 0-2, R Fitzgerald 0-2, J Murphy 0-2.		S Twomey 1-2, R McDonnell 1-0, R Whitley 1-0, V Twomey 0-2, D Daly 0-1.

12 May 1974 Second round	Mallow	2-03 - 3-11	Blackrock	Coachford
	B Barrett 2-0, T Sheehan 0-1, J McSweeney 0-1, P Moriarty 0-1.		É O'Donoghue 3-6, D Buckley 0-1, R Cummins 0-1, P Moylan 0-1, J Russell 0-1, T Cashman 0-1.

21 April 1974 Second round	Duhallow	1-06 - 5-10	Carrigdhoun	Mallow
	P O'Connor 1-0, B Buckley 0-2, P Buckley 0-1, J O'Callaghan 0-1, R Quinn 0-1, B Daly 0-1.		JK Coleman 1-5, D Coleman 2-1, G Hanley 1-3, P Harrington 1-0, F Coleman 0-1.	Referee: T O'Riordan (Mallow)

2 June 1974 Second round	Nemo Rangers	5-08 - 2-14	Glen Rovers	Cork Athletic Grounds, Cork
	N Morgan 1-4, L Murphy 2-0, D Calnan 1-1, W Barry 1-0, B Morgan 0-1, D Allen 0-1, K Murphy 0-1.		M Ryan 2-2, P Harte 0-5, J O'Sullivan 0-3, P Doherty 0-2, JJ O'Neill 0-1, L McAuliffe 0-1.	Referee: P Cronin (St. Finbarr's)

28 April 1974 Second round	Carbery	2-17 - 3-04	Avondhu	Cork Athletic Grounds, Cork
	S O'Donovan 1-2, N Crowley 0-4, S Crean 1-0, G Long 0-3, J Gabriel 0-3, T Harrington 0-2, F Crowley 0-1, T Crowley 0-1, S O'Neill 0-1.		D Feehan 2-1, J McCarthy 1-1, W Walsh 0-2.	Referee: P Cronin (St. Finbarr's)

28 April 1974 Second round	Cloughduv	0-03 - 1-11	St. Finbarr's	Ballinhassig
	C Kelly 0-2, J Kelly 0-1.		C McCarthy 0-5, J O'Shea 1-1, S Gillen 0-3, G McCarthy 0-2.	Referee: D Coleman

21 April 1974 Second round	University College Cork	4-12 - 1-08	Imokilly
	W Glavin 2-6, Seán O'Farrell 2-2, D Buckley 1-1, M Aherne 0-2, J Fenton 0-1.		J Buckley 0-6, D O'Grady 1-0, W Barrett 0-1, O Cussen 0-1.	Referee: W Walsh (Mayfield)

21 April 1974 Second round	Muskerry	2-06 - 3-11	Youghal	Riverstown
	M Malone 1-3, J Allen 1-1, N Collins 0-2.		W Walsh 2-1, S O'Leary 1-4, R O'Sullivan 0-2, P Hegarty 0-2, J O'Malley 0-1, H Fouhy 0-1.

=== Quarter-finals ===
12 May 1974 Quarter-final	Imokilly	6-09 - 3-06	Youghal	Castlemartyr
	M Aherne 3-0, W Glavin 1-4, T Canavan 1-1, D Buckley 1-0, Seán O'Farrell 0-2, Séamus O'Farrell 0-1, J Fenton 0-1.		A Regan 2-0, S O'Leary 1-1, R O'Sullivan 0-2, H Fouhy 0-2, P Hegarty 0-1.	Referee: M Walsh (Mayfield)

2 June 1974 Quarter-final	St. Finbarr's	1-12 - 1-07	Carbery	Cloughduv
	C Cullinane 1-2, G McCarthy 0-3, C Roche 0-2, J O'Shea 0-1, J McCarthy 0-1, C McCarthy 0-1, E Fitzgerald 0-1, W Grady 0-1.		N Crowley 0-6, S O'Donovan 1-0, R Wilmot 0-1.

15 June 1974 Quarter-final	Blackrock	6-20 - 3-02	Sarsfields	Riverstown
	R Cummins 2-2, P Kavanagh 2-2, É O'Donoghue 1-3, P Moylan 0-6, N Keeffe 1-1, D Collins 0-4, F Cummins 0-1, T Cashman 0-1.		B Cotter 1-0, J McEvoy 1-0, É Kelleher 1-0, B Óg Murphy 0-1, M McCarthy 0-1.	Referee: M Keane (Cloughduv)

16 June 1974 Quarter-final	Nemo Rangers	3-15 - 4-10	Carrigdhoun	Manning Park, Passage
	N Morgan 1-3, D Calnan 1-3, J O'Leary 1-3, D Allen 0-5, S Buckley 0-1.		JK Coleman 1-2, T Fogarty 1-2, F Coleman 1-0, D Coleman 1-0, B Coleman 0-2, G Hanley 0-2, K O'Donovan 0-1, G Webb 0-1.	Referee: P Cronin (St. Finbarr's)

=== Semi-finals ===
7 July 1974 Semi-final	Imokilly	1-12 - 2-11	St. Finbarr's	Clonmult Memorial Park, Midleton
	W Galvin 1-4, Seán O'Farrell 0-2, D Clifford 0-2, T Canavan 0-1, Séamus O'Farrell 0-1, G O'Driscoll 0-1, P O'Connor 0-1.		C McCarthy 1-2, S Gillen 0-4, S Looney 1-0, É Fitzpatrick 0-3, J Barry-Murphy 0-1, G McCarthy 0-1.	Referee: M Walsh (Mayfield)

8 September 1974 Semi-final	Blackrock	2-14 - 3-09	Nemo Rangers	Cork Athletic Grounds, Cork
	É O'Sullivan 2-2, D Collins 0-6, P Moylan 0-2, É O'Donoghue 0-2, M Waters 0-1, T Cashman 0-1.		D Allen 1-1, D Calnan 0-4, N Morgan 1-0, D Murphy 1-0, J Barrett 0-2, B Morgan 0-2.	Referee: D O'Brien (Cobh)

=== Final ===
15 September 1974 Final	St. Finbarr's	2-17 - 2-14	Blackrock	The Mardyke, Cork
	C McCarthy 2-3, C Roche 0-4, S Looney 0-4, J Barry-Murphy 0-2, G McCarthy 0-2, S Gillen 0-1, É Fitzpatrick 0-1.		P Moylan 0-6, É O'Sullivan 1-2, J Russell 1-1, F Cummins 0-3, D Collins 0-2.

== Championship statistics ==
=== Top scorers ===
Top scorers overall

Rank	Player	Club	Tally	Total	Matches	Average
1	Willie Glavin	Imokilly	4-14	26	3	8.66
2	Éamonn O'Donoghue	Blackrock	4-11	23	4	7.75
3	Charlie McCarthy	St. Finbarr's	3-11	20	4	5.00
4	Noel Morgan	Nemo Rangers	3-07	16	3	5.33
5	Pat Moylan	Blackrock	0-15	15	4	3.75
6	Éamonn O'Sullivan	Blackrock	3-04	13	2	6.50
6	John Kevin Coleman	Carrigdhoun	2-07	13	2	6.50
8	Donal Sheehan	Na Piarsaigh	4-00	12	2	6.00
8	Seán O'Farrell	Imokilly	2-06	12	3	4.00
8	Donie Collins	Blackrock	0-12	12	4	3.00

Top scorers in a single game

Rank	Player	Club	Tally	Total	Opposition
1	Éamonn O'Donoghue	Blackrock	3-06	15	Mallow
2	Donal Sheehan	Na Piarsaigh	4-00	12	Passage
2	Willie Glavin	Imokilly	2-06	12	UCC
4	Pat Buckley	Mallow	0-11	11	Blackrock
5	Mick Aherne	Imokilly	3-00	9	Youghal
5	Charlie McCarthy	St. Finbarr's	2-03	9	Blackrock
7	Mick Ryan	Glen Rovers	2-02	8	Nemo Rangers
7	Seán O'Farrell	UCC	2-02	8	Imokilly
7	Ray Cummins	Blackrock	2-02	8	Sarsfields
7	Pat Kavanagh	Blackrock	2-02	8	Sarsfields
7	Éamonn O'Sullivan	Blackrock	2-02	8	Nemo Rangers
7	John Kevin Coleman	Carrigdhoun	1-05	8	Duhallow

=== Miscellaneous ===
- The semi-final between Blackrock and Nemo Rangers is the last championship game played at the Cork Athletic Grounds.
- The final was played at the Mardyke due to the construction of the new Páirc Uí Chaoimh
