= Sudden death (sport) =

Endgame state of competition

In a sport or game, sudden death (also sudden-death, sudden-death overtime, or a sudden-death round) is a form of competition where play ends as soon as one competitor is ahead of the others, with that competitor becoming the winner. Sudden death is typically used as a tiebreaker when a contest is tied at the end of regulation (normal) playing time or the completion of the normal playing task.

An alternative tiebreaker method to sudden death is to play an extra, shortened segment of the game. In association football 30 minutes of extra time (overtime) after 90 minutes of normal time, or in golf one playoff round (18 holes) after four standard rounds (72 holes) are two alternatives. Sudden death playoffs typically end more quickly than the shortened play alternative. Reducing the variability of the event's duration assists those scheduling television time and team travel. Fans may see sudden death as exciting and suspenseful, or they may view the format as compromising the sport, compared to play during regulation time. For example, prior to 2012, the National Football League (American football) used a sudden-death rule that encouraged the team possessing the ball to just kick a field goal to end the game rather than striving to score a touchdown.

Sudden death yields a victor for the contest without requiring a specific period of time. It may be called "next score wins" or similar, although in some games, the winner may result from penalizing the other competitor for a mistake. Sudden death has been called sudden victory to avoid the mention of death and serious disease, particularly in sports with a high risk of physical injury. This euphemism became one of announcer Curt Gowdy's idiosyncrasies in 1971 when the AFC divisional championship game between the Kansas City Chiefs and Miami Dolphins went into overtime.

North American professional sports using a sudden death method of settling a tied game include the modified version now employed by the National Football League, the National Hockey League and, also in a modified sense, the PGA Tour (golf). Baseball and cricket use a unique method of tie-breaking that incorporates elements of sudden death. In baseball, a winning run scored by the home team in an extra inning is often referred to as a walk-off, as the players can immediately walk off the field; the equivalent in cricket's Super Over tiebreaker is referred to as the winning team having successfully completed their run chase or chased down the target.

In some goal-scoring games sudden death extra time may be given in which the first goal scored wins. In association football it is called the golden goal, although it was abolished from the Laws of the Game in 2004 by FIFA.

== American football ==
Sudden death has been perceived as a poor fit for gridiron football because the process gives an inherent advantage to the team who starts with possession of the ball: they can end the game immediately by driving a relatively short distance into field goal range and then kicking a field goal, but defensive scores such as the pick-six or the safety are much more rare.

All organized forms of American football abolished pure sudden death for overtime as of the 2011 season. High school football and college football, never used it, instead either allowing ties to stand or using alternatives like the Kansas Playoff.

=== National Football League ===
Until 1940, all National Football League games tied at the end of regulation time ended as a tie. Late in the 1940 season, NFL President Carl Storck announced that sudden death periods would be authorized for any playoff game needed to decide either division title. This did not apply to the league championship game, which would crown co-champions in the event of a tie. Commissioner Elmer Layden approved a similar arrangement for the 1941 season, with the same limitation.

Sudden death overtime was approved for the NFL championship game in 1946. The first playoff game requiring overtime was the 1958 NFL Championship Game.

In 1974, the NFL adopted a 15-minute sudden-death overtime period for regular-season games; in 2017 it was cut to 10 minutes. The game ended as a tie if neither team scored in overtime. When a team gets near the end zone, it typically tried to kick a field goal. An overtime game can also be won by scoring a touchdown (in such an event, the extra point is not attempted). This usually happened on a play that began with field position far enough away from the end zone to make a field goal difficult if not impossible, but it can also result from a team choosing not to attempt a field goal until reaching fourth down, even if the team enters an easy field goal range; this strategy only works if the team can maintain possession of the ball and does not fumble the ball away, throw an interception or lose enough yardage to back out of field goal range. Only thrice has an overtime game been won by a safety. In recent years, sportscasters have referred to such scoring plays as "walk-offs", as both teams can walk off the field after the play.

Since the 2010–11 playoffs, in the post-season, each team was allowed at least one possession to score in overtime, unless the team receiving the kickoff scored a touchdown or if the defensive team scored a touchdown or safety on the same possession. True sudden death rules applied if both teams have had their initial possession and the game remains tied. This rule did not actually come into use during the 2010 playoffs, with the first overtime game under the new rules not occurring until 2011, with the Denver Broncos scoring a long touchdown on their first play from scrimmage against the Pittsburgh Steelers. A 2022 rule change gives both teams one possession to start first overtime in playoffs, whether or not a touchdown is scored first; as of three years later, this rule also applied for regular season games.

This rule was adopted for the start of the 2012 regular season. It was adopted to counter the criticism that the outcome of overtime games was very frequently decided by the coin toss, as the team which won it usually attempted only enough offensive action to maneuver into field goal range and seldom made a real effort to score a touchdown. In the regular season, games still tied after one full overtime period will continue to be allowed to end in a tie.

No overtime is used in preseason up to 1973 and since 2021.

There have been three tied games in regulation during an NFL league championship game -- 1958, 2016, and 2023.

For information on games that have taken a long time under sudden death, see Overtime.

=== Arena football ===
In arena football from 2007 to 2019, each team was allowed one possession in the first overtime, after which the leading team wins unless the score is still tied, then sudden death rules applied thereafter (a similar, modified sudden death format, with a 10-minute limit, was used in the NFL Europa League). Prior to 2007 the league used extra time, a 7.5-minute extra period; if the game was still tied at this point, it was recorded as a tied game. The modified sudden death rules resulted in a definite conclusion after one overtime period (only one tied game was recorded under each of the two prior overtime rules). From 2007 to 2019 and since 2024, all Arena football games, both regular season and playoff, ended with a winner. Any succeeding overtime periods were true sudden death periods.

== Association football ==
Sudden death has a controversial history in association football. Important matches were traditionally resolved by replaying the entire match, however, in the era of television and tight travel schedules, this is often impractical.

In many matches, if the score is tied after the full 90 minutes, a draw results; however, if one team must be eliminated, some form of tie-breaking must occur. Originally, two 15-minute halves of extra time were held, and if the teams remained equal at the end of the halves, kicks from the penalty mark are held.

To try to decrease the chances of requiring kicks from the penalty mark, the IFAB, the world law-making body of the sport, experimented with new rules. The golden goal rule transformed the overtime periods into sudden death until the periods were over, where shoot-outs would occur. As this became unpopular, the silver goal rule was instituted, causing the game to end if the scores were not equal after the first 15-minute period as well as the second. The silver goal has also fallen into disrepute; the UEFA Euro 2004 was the last event to use it, after which the original tie-breaking methods were restored.

The main criticism of golden goal is the quickness of ending the game, and the pressure on coaches and players. Once a goal is scored, the game is over and the opponent cannot attempt to answer the goal within the remaining time. Therefore, teams would place more emphasis on not conceding a goal rather than scoring a goal, and many golden goal extra time periods remained scoreless.

In NCAA collegiate play in the United States, however, sudden death, adopted in 1997 for all championship play in addition to regular season play, used to remain through 2021, but was reinstated for the playoffs three years later. In 2005, the Division II Women's Championship game ended in sudden death as a goal was scored three minutes into the overtime to end the championship match. Sudden death is still prevalent in youth play, for the safety of players.

If the teams are still tied after the initial allocated number in the penalty shoot-out, the game goes to sudden-death penalties, where each team takes a further one penalty each, repeated until the first team scores when the other does not wins the game. The first sudden death in a World Cup after the penalty shoot-out ended equal was in the West Germany vs France semi-final in 1982.

== Boxing ==
In amateur boxing, if both scores are equal and no draw option is allowed by the contest regulations, an extra round is appointed; whoever wins that round, scores the plus to one's score, and wins the match by a slight margin.

== Badminton ==
In badminton, if a set is tied at 29–all, golden point is played; whoever scores this point wins it.

== Baseball and softball ==
Baseball and softball are not true sudden-death sports, but they have one comparable situation.

Baseball and softball games cannot end until both teams have had an equal number of turns at bat, unless further play (by the home team if they lead after 8 1/2 innings) cannot affect the outcome. In the final scheduled inning (typically, in professional and advanced amateur leagues the ninth inning, but usually the seventh for youth leagues and softball, and the sixth for leagues for subteens such as Little League), if the visitors complete their turn at bat and still trail the hosts, the game ends. If the visitors lead or the game is tied, the hosts take their "last ups" at bat. If the hosts should exceed the visitors' score, the game ends at the conclusion of the play on which the hosts take this insurmountable lead (if the final scheduled inning ends in a tie, multiple extra innings will be played, and that procedure repeats until one team leads, which wins the game).

The ability to bat last is an advantage of being the home team. It is said that "visitors must play to win; hosts need only play to tie" because tying forces an extra inning.

A tied game in the bottom of the final scheduled inning puts pressure on the visitors. For example, with a runner on third base and fewer than two outs, the visitors cannot afford even to get certain types of outs that would let the game-ending run score after the out.

A scoring play that ends the game is called a "walk-off", a term originally coined by Hall of Famer Dennis Eckersley in about 1988, who referred to game-ending home runs as "walk-off pieces", as all that is left for the visiting team to do was to walk off the field. It was popularized by a sports broadcaster after 2000, and is sometimes mistakenly thought to have been so named because "everyone walks off the field" after the winning run scores.

A game-ending home run is an exception to the rule stated above; the game does not end when the winning run scores, but continues until the batter and all runners score (provided they run the bases correctly), although prior to 1920, a batter hitting a ball outside of the park to end a game was only given credit for as many bases as required to score the winning run; if, for example, the winning run was on third when the ball was hit, the batter would be credited with a single.

== Basketball ==
Basketball does not traditionally employ sudden death to decide games; it instead uses multiple five-minute overtime periods to determine the result of games tied after regulation play. The entire overtime is played; if the game remains tied, this procedure is repeated.

The NBA Summer League, a developmental summer league, employs sudden death basketball after the first overtime. The rules state Double overtime & thereafter is sudden death (first team to score a point wins). In the first sudden death professional basketball game, Devin Ebanks hit a game winner with 45 seconds elapsed for the D-League Select team, beating the summer league Atlanta Hawks.

Another form of basketball does employ a sudden-death overtime. 3x3, a formalized version of the half-court three-on-three game, uses an untimed overtime period that ends by rule once either team has scored 2 points. In this form of the sport, shots taken from behind the "three-point" arc are worth 2 points and all other shots are worth 1 point.

The Basketball Tournament utilizes a target number known as the Elam Ending, which requires the leading team to score a set number of points to end the game, and has been adapted by the NBA's G League.

== Cricket ==
During a cricket match, if one team has completed all of their innings (turns to bat and try to score runs), this allows the other team to immediately win the game by taking the lead while they are batting. The winning team is said to have "chased down" the target score set by the first team (the "target score" being the number of runs scored by the first team plus one.) If the winning runs are scored by a boundary (a ball that leaves the field), all of the runs scored by the boundary are credited to the winning team's score; otherwise, the game ends once the winners have a lead of one run. These rules also apply in the case of a Super Over tiebreaker, wherein one or more extra innings may be played by each team.

The bowl-out was formerly used as a tiebreaker in cricket. Similar to penalty shootouts in other sports, it involved both teams' players getting 5 attempts to hit the wicket at one end of the pitch by throwing the ball from the other end; if both teams tied on number of hits after the 5 attempts, the bowl-out moved to sudden death, with both teams getting one additional attempt at a time, and with the team that got more hits after both teams had had an equal number of attempts winning.

== Fencing ==
An individual fencing bout lasts for five touches in a poule match, or 15 touches in a direct elimination (DE) match in all three weapons (épée, foil, and sabre. Although sabre bouts rarely go to full-time, the same time frames apply. Matches are also timed (three minutes for a poule match, and three periods of three minutes for a DE). If neither fencer has reached five or 15 points within the time limit, the leading fencer is deemed the winner. However, if the fencers are tied after the allotted time, one minute of extra time is added.

Before resuming the bout, one fencer is randomly awarded "priority". The first fencer to score a valid hit within extra time wins the match; if no valid hits are scored within the time, that fencer with priority is declared the victor.

In the normal course of a match, there is a de facto sudden death situation if both fencers are tied at four (or 14) touches each. The final hit is called "la belle". The fencers may salute each other before playing for the final point.

== Gaelic games ==
The Gaelic games of Gaelic football, ladies' Gaelic football, camogie and hurling have occasionally used sudden death (called a "golden score") to decide ties. Replays, extra time, penalty shoot-outs and free-taking competitions are usually used, but the golden score has been tried out in a few competitions, such as the 2006 Ireland West Connacht Hurling League, and the 2022 FBD Insurance League. With golden score, extra time is played after a drawn game, and if the game is still tied, the next score wins — whether it be a goal or a point, from play or a placed ball. Some commenters have said that golden score is more suitable than a penalty shoot-out, as the latter is a skill more suitable to soccer, and places undue emphasis on the player(s) who miss. It is widely used in underage and schools competitions, such as Cumann na mBunscol and Féile na nGael.

== Golf ==
In individual match play, players level after the regulation 18 or 36 holes will play extra holes in sudden death. In team tournaments, players may gain half a point each for a tie rather than play sudden death; this is the case in the Ryder Cup, for example. In the Presidents Cup, there was provision for a single-player sudden death shootout if the entire competition ended in a tie. When this came to pass in 2003, the tiebreak was unfinished at dusk. There was no provision for an extra day's play, and both team captains agreed to declare the match tied and share the trophy.

Traditionally, professional stroke play golf tournaments ending in a tie were played off the next day with an eighteen-hole match. Modern considerations such as television coverage and the tight travel schedule of most leading golfers have led to this practice being almost entirely abandoned, and in all but the most important tournaments, the champion is determined by sudden death. All players tied after the completion of regulation play are taken to a predetermined hole, and then play it and others in order as needed. If at least two players are tied, player(s) who score higher on a hole than the other competitors is/are immediately eliminated, and those still tied continue play until one remaining player has a lower score for a hole than any of the others remaining, who is declared the winner.

Of the four men's major championships, only The Masters uses a sudden-death playoff format, adopted in 1976 and first used in 1979. Through 2017 (and last used in 2008), the U.S. Open had an 18-hole playoff at stroke play on the day after the main tournament, with sudden-death if needed after 18 holes. A two-hole aggregate playoff is used since 2018, followed by sudden-death if needed. The Open Championship first used a four-hole total stroke playoff in 1989, which was reduced to three holes for 2019. The PGA Championship uses a three-hole total-stroke playoff, first used in 2000, it introduced the sudden-death playoff to the majors in 1977, and used it seven times through 1996. Sudden death is used if a tie exists at the end of the scheduled playoff.

== Ice hockey ==
Sudden-death overtime has traditionally been used in playoff and championship games in hockey. It has been used in the National Hockey League throughout the league's history. The first NHL game with sudden-death overtime was game four of the 1919 Stanley Cup Final. Currently, the NHL, American Hockey League, and ECHL also use the sudden-death system in their regular seasons, playing a five-minute overtime period when the score is tied at the end of regulation time.

In 2000, the AHL reduced the teams to four players each during the five-minute overtime (but any two-man advantage is administered with five-on-three play rather than four-on-two). The ECHL and NHL both changed to the four-on-four overtime format in 2001, with the International Olympic Committee following by no later than 2010. By 2015 the NHL went to the three-on-three format. In the SPHL, a class A minor league, the overtime is three-on-three, with the team that would be on the power play given a fourth, and a fifth attacker respectively instead, and any penalty in the final two minutes results in a penalty shot instead of a power play.

If neither team scores during this period, the teams use a penalty-shot shootout, consisting of three players in the NHL or five players in the minor leagues, to determine the winner. In the NHL, if no team wins this shootout, a 1-by-1, alternating shootout ensues. No player may shoot twice until every non-goaltender on the bench has taken a shot.

During championship playoffs, however, all games are played to a conclusion resulting in a victory for one team and a loss for the other. These are true sudden-death games, which have gone on into as many as six additional full 20-minute periods with five players, instead of the five-minute period with at least three players.

IIHF hockey, since 2019, repeats the overtime procedure for gold medal games if neither team scores after one 20-minute, sudden-death overtime period; shootouts will occur otherwise. The shootout is decided in best-of-5 rounds, then round by round (in other words, if one team scores in the 6th round or beyond and the other fails, the game ends, unlike most professional leagues), and players can shoot as many times as the team desires (first 5 rounds are done in order, then reversely thereafter; may use new or same players). There is a 5-minute overtime in round-robin games [10 minutes in elimination/bronze medal games], plus the best-of-5-round shootout procedure.

== Judo ==
In the case of a tie in competition judo, the match proceeds to Golden Score, another form of Sudden Death. Sudden Death in competition Judo consists of a 5 minutes long match, during which the first competitor to achieve a score is awarded the match. Penalties in Judo award points to the other competitor, making fair-play of absolute importance. If no victor is decided in Golden Score, the match is decided based on a Referee's Decision. A Referee's Decision is a vote amongst the Referee and both Judges of the match.

== Kabaddi ==
Kabaddi features a "golden raid" towards the end of its tiebreaking process, in which certain rules are modified to encourage point-scoring, and the team that scores first wins.

== Kho-kho ==
Kho-kho incorporates a unique tiebreaker (known as a Minimum Chase) related to sudden death: each team gets an additional turn to score, and the team that scores its first point faster wins. (For example, if one team scores its first point in 34 seconds during its Minimum Chase additional turn, and then the other team scores its first point in 35 seconds during its additional turn, then the first team wins.)

== Mixed martial arts ==
In mixed martial arts competitions that consist of an even number of rounds, a type of sudden death is sometimes used in the event that each competitor wins an equal number of points. This is not a true sudden death that ends on the first point scored, since MMA competitions do not generally score individual points. Rather, it is a final round of combat, the winner of which is declared the winner of the match. This particular rule, known as "Sudden Victory", has been commonly seen in previous seasons of the reality television show The Ultimate Fighter when the competition has consisted of two rounds. A sudden victory round rule was also implemented in the tournament to decide Ultimate Fighting Championship's first Flyweight Champion.

== Professional wrestling ==
Sudden death in wrestling is most commonly seen in Real Canadian Wrestling tournament matches, in which a victor must be decided. This happens in the case of a double knockout or double countout. In the United States, Sudden Death rules occurs mainly in an Iron Man match when there is a tie after the time limit have expired (most notably at Wrestlemania XII when the match between Shawn Michaels and Bret Hart ended 0-0 after the 60 minute limit).

An example that invoked sudden death occurred in the 2005 Royal Rumble. John Cena and Batista were left, and both men's feet touched the ground at the same time. A comparable draw leading to sudden death might happen if the shoulders of a wrestler applying a submission move are on the mat.

== Rugby league ==
Drawn National Rugby League premiership and State of Origin series games are subject to sudden death extra time after 80 minutes of play, called the golden point. Golden point consists of two five-minute halves, with the teams swapping ends at the end of the first half.

Any score (try, penalty goal, or field goal) in golden point wins the game for the scoring team - no conversion is attempted if a try is the winning score.

In the NRL, the victor in golden point receives two competition points, the loser none. In the event that no further scoring occurs, the game is drawn, and each team receives one point each.

== Rugby union ==
In the knockout stages of rugby competitions, most notably the Rugby World Cup, a match drawn after 80 minutes does not proceed immediately to sudden death conditions. Two 10-minute extra time periods are played first, if scores are level after 100 minutes then the rules call for a single sudden-death period of 10 minutes to be played. If the sudden-death extra time period results in no scoring a kicking competition is used to determine the winner.

However, no match in the history of the Rugby World Cup has ever gone past 100 minutes into a sudden-death extra time period.

=== Rugby sevens ===
In the World Rugby Sevens Series, a match that ends in draw proceeds to multiple sudden death periods of 5 minutes.

== Tennis and volleyball ==
In contrast with the usual sudden-death procedure of awarding the victory to the next side to score, tennis and volleyball require that the margin of victory be two. A volleyball game tied at the target score continues until one team's score exceeds the other's by two points.

The traditional requirement that a tennis set be won by two games sometimes resulted in men's five-set matches lasting over six hours (including an 8-hour 11-minute set at Wimbledon) or, in women's/doubles' three-set matches, lasting over three hours, which is a major disruption to a television schedule. To shorten matches, sets tied at six games each can now be broken by a single tiebreaker game. This is awarded to the first player to score seven points. The winner must lead the loser by two points, so tiebreaker games can become lengthy in their own right.

In March 2022, the ATP, WTA and ITF announced that final-set tiebreaks in all Grand Slams will have a 10-point tie break ("18-point tiebreaker", first to 10, 2-point minimum lead) when the set reaches six games all (6-6). This includes the French Open and Olympics.

== World Chase Tag ==
In the event of a tie in a World Chase Tag match, a "sudden-death chase-off" takes place, which consists of a pair of 20-second rounds with each team chasing in one and evading in the other. The team with the longest evasion time wins. If this results in a further tie (i.e. both teams successfully evade for 20 seconds) the process is repeated.

== Bibliography ==
- Gifford, Frank; Richmond, Peter. The Glory Game:How the 1958 NFL Championship Changed Football Forever. HarperCollins e-books. ISBN 978-0-06-171659-1.

== See also ==
- Tiebreaker
  - Overtime (sports)
  - Penalty shootout
- Single elimination tournament, where losing a match means exiting the tournament
- Variations of Cassino (card game) that provide that points are scored immediately and can end a tie game in the middle of a round
