= Shootout (sport) =

Sports match procedure

Shootout is a method of determining a winner in sports matches that would have otherwise been drawn or tied. The rules for shootouts vary between sports and even different competitions; however, the usual form is similar to penalty shots in that a single player takes one shot on goal from a specified spot, the only defender being the goalkeeper. If the result is still tied, the shootout usually continues on a "goal-for-goal" basis, with the teams taking shots alternately, and the one that scores a goal unmatched by the other team is declared the winner. This may continue until every player has taken a shot, after which players may take extra shots, until the tie is broken, which is also known as "sudden death".

== Rationale ==
A penalty shootout is normally used only in "no ties allowed" situations (for example, a tournament where the losers must be eliminated) and where other methods such as extra time, sudden death, and/or the away goal rule have failed to determine a winner first. It avoids the delays involved in staging replayed matches in order to produce a tie-break. A common complaint about penalty shootouts is that they only determine the better team in the one, rather narrow, discipline of taking penalty shots, rather than fairly determining the better team in overall play.

== Sports ==
Sports in which a penalty shootout may be used include:

=== American football ===
In the revived XFL, for games that end in a tie after regulation, each team gets up to five one-play possessions to score two-point conversions from the five-yard line, with each team taking alternating turns. Unlike other gridiron football leagues, a coin toss does not determine who has first possession in overtime; instead, the visiting team has first possession and the home team second for each round. The defensive team cannot score in overtime; if the offensive team commits a turnover, the play is ruled dead immediately. If the defensive team commits a penalty, the ball is placed on the one-yard line and the conversion attempt retried; any subsequent defensive penalty results in an automatic score for the offensive team. If the offensive team commits a pre-snap penalty, the ball is respotted pursuant to regular rules; however, a post-snap offensive penalty results in loss of down and no score. If the score remains tied after five rounds, subsequent rounds are played until the tie is broken.

Since the 2021 NCAA Division I FBS football season, if a game reaches triple overtime, teams alternate running two-point plays, instead of starting another drive at the opponent's 25-yard line.

=== Association football ===
Penalty shootouts, properly known as "kicks from the penalty mark" and a nickname of "spot kicks", are used as a tie-breaking measure in many knock-out tournaments or cup competitions where matches cannot end in a draw. If scores are level after regular time and extra-time (if used), each team will alternately take penalty kicks against the opposition goalkeeper. If, after five pairs of kicks, an equal number of goals have been scored by each team the shootout proceeds to sudden death.

=== Cricket ===
As a tiebreaker, players from both teams take turns attempting to throw the ball at a wicket, with sudden death initiating after both teams have had five attempts. This method is no longer used in international cricket.

=== Field hockey ===
Until 2011, tied knockout matches at elite level were normally resolved by a penalty‑stroke competition: each side nominated five players to take alternating penalty strokes, with sudden‑death rounds if the scores remained level.

An alternative penalty shoot‑out – often called a penalty shuffle – was adopted by the International Hockey Federation in April 2011. In this format the attacker starts with the ball on the 23‑metre line and has eight seconds to score in a one‑on‑one contest against the goalkeeper; play ends sooner if a goal is scored, a foul is committed or the ball leaves the circle. The procedure is conducted as a best‑of‑five series followed, if required, by sudden death using the same players.

The new method had been trialled in the Euro Hockey League since its inaugural 2007–08 season and was first used at an FIH event during the 2011 Women's Champions Challenge II, where Belarus beat Chile for bronze. Shoot‑outs made their Olympic debut at the 2012 Games, when the Netherlands defeated New Zealand in the women's semi‑final.

Great Britain claimed their first women's Olympic gold by defeating the Netherlands 2–0 in a shoot‑out after a 3–3 draw at Rio 2016, while Belgium secured their maiden men's title at Tokyo 2020 (held in 2021), edging Australia 3–2 following a 1–1 stalemate.

=== Gaelic games ===
Since c. 2010 penalty shootouts have occasionally been used to decide knockout games in the Gaelic games of hurling, Gaelic football, camogie and ladies' Gaelic football. Traditionally drawn games were settled by a replay, with extra time also being used, but fixture congestion has led to pressure for "winner on the day" solutions.

They were first used in some club competitions. Rules vary between tournaments, but in general five players are chosen to face the goalkeeper, who must defend the goals alone (previously, in hurling and camogie, three players defended against a penalty). In addition, only goals count: in normal play, hitting the ball over the bar and between the post scores a point (1/3 of a goal), but this does not count in a shootout (However, there have been some contests, where points were counted in a shootout.) If the teams are still tied after five pucks or kicks, sudden death is entered, with the same five players being used for the sudden death shots.

Shootouts were used in the "sevens" All-Ireland in 2013 and the ladies' football Interprovincial Championships in 2014.

Alternatives to penalty shootouts include the use of free-taking shoot-outs, taken from a distance of 65 m (71 yd) in hurling, and 45 m (49 yd) or 33 m (36 yd) in Gaelic football, or 30 m (33 yd) in ladies' football. In these competitions, only points counted, with a goal counted as a miss. The GAA's Central Council backed a move to penalty shootouts in 2018.

The first penalty shootout in an inter-county competition was when Down defeated Offaly in the 2020 Christy Ring Cup.

Bernard Brogan has criticised their use in Gaelic football, saying that the skill required is more appropriate to soccer, and that 45-metre kicks may be a better option. Tommy Walsh also criticised them, pointing out the increased focus brought on the individual who misses a penalty. A Killarney Advertiser poll found that 68% of fans were opposed to shootouts.

"Golden score" ("next score wins") extra time has also been posited as an alternative. This rule was in place for the 2022 FBD Insurance League, but no games were drawn. This has an advantage over soccer's golden goal, as in Gaelic games it is much easier to score and golden-score extra time would be unlikely to last more than a few minutes.

=== Handball ===
If a game is tied after regular time and a clear winner is necessary (like in knockout tournaments), it would proceed to two 5-minute periods of overtime with a 1-minute break before each. If the scores are still tied, a second overtime of 2x5 minutes is played. If the game is still tied after 2 overtimes, the game goes into a penalty shootout. Five players per side throw 7-meters-penalties, if still tied, one player per side take a penalty throw until a decision is found, which is the same procedure as in association football.

=== Ice hockey ===
If the score remains tied after an overtime period, the subsequent shootout consists of a set number of players from each team (3 in the NHL and IIHF rules and 5 in most North American minor leagues, and one in some other leagues) taking penalty shots. After these shots, the team with the most goals is awarded the victory. If the score is still tied, additional shots are played until one team scores and the other does not; the scoring team wins and is awarded two points in the standings, while the losing team is awarded one point. In North America, a team receives 2 points for a win in either regulation time, overtime or shootout, while the losing team receives no points for a regulation loss and one point for an overtime or shootout loss. In the NHL, the player scoring the shootout-winning goal is not officially credited with a goal in his personal statistics; thus, a player who scores twice in regulation and once in the shootout is not credited with a hat trick. On December 16, 2014, the Florida Panthers defeated the Washington Capitals 2–1 in the 20th round of a shootout, making it the longest shootout in NHL history.

In many European leagues a team receives three points for a regulation win and two for an overtime or shootout win, with the losing team's points awarded in the same manner as in North America. Regardless of the number of goals scored during the shootout by either team, the final score awards the winning team one more goal than the score at the end of regulation time (or overtime).

In many North American minor leagues, the player that scores the shootout-winning goal is credited with one shot on goal and one goal. The losing goaltender of the shootout is credited with one shot against, one goal against, and an overtime/shootout loss. North American professional hockey does not allow shootouts in post-season play, and instead will play multiple 20-minute sudden-death overtime periods as are needed until a team scores. The official IIHF name of the procedure is game-winning shots (GWS). In some European countries, the post-game penalty shots are unofficially known as "bullets".

=== Rugby union ===
In rugby union, five players take kicks on goal from the centre of the 22-metre line. If the scores are level after five players from each team have kicked, the shootout goes to sudden death. This tie-breaking method was used for the first time at a professional level in Leicester Tigers' Heineken Cup semi-final victory over the Cardiff Blues on 3 May 2009; after a 26–26 draw after extra time, Leicester won the shootout 7–6. The second instance of this was in the 2022 Champion's Cup quarterfinal between Toulouse and Munster, after a 24–24 draw, with Toulouse winning the shootout 4–2. The third instance occurred in the 2025 United Rugby Championship quarterfinal between Munster and the Sharks, with the Sharks winning the shootout 6-4.

=== Water polo ===
Following a tie in regulation, 5 players and a goalkeeper are chosen by the coaches of each team. Players shoot from the 5 meter line alternately at either end of the pool in turn until all five have taken a shot. If the score is still tied, the same players shoot alternately until one team misses and the other scores. The scores from the penalty shootout are added to the score instead of being counted as a separate score as in other sports. Colleges have no such shootout procedure; teams play two straight 3-minute periods, and if still tied play multiple 3-minute golden goal periods.

== Other uses ==
Penalty shootouts are also used on a few game shows:

- The final round of The Weakest Link involves the remaining two contestants having to answer a series of three to five questions each (depending on the version); the player who answered more questions correctly in the previous round has the option to choose who goes first. Whoever has more correct answers at the end of the round is declared the winner; in the event of tie, the round goes to sudden death, where questions continue to be asked to every player until one contestant answers correctly and their opponent answers incorrectly.
- The Rich List uses a penalty shootout tiebreaker where the two teams are asked questions about the same subject until one team answers correctly and the other team answers incorrectly. Whoever gives the last correct answer in the tiebreaker advances to the bonus round.

== See also ==
- Tiebreaker
