= 1964 All-Ireland Junior Hurling Championship =

1964 inter-county junior hurling championship

All Ireland Champions
- Winners: Down (1st win)
- Captain: Charlie McMullan

All Ireland Runners-up
- Runners-up: London

Provincial Champions
- Munster: Not Played
- Leinster: Wicklow
- Ulster: Down
- Connacht: Roscommon

The 1964 All-Ireland Junior Hurling Championship was the 43rd staging of the All-Ireland Junior Championship since its establishment by the Gaelic Athletic Association in 1912.

London entered the championship as the defending champions.

The All-Ireland final was played on 4 October 1964 at New Eltham in London, between Down and London, in what was their first ever meeting in the final. Down won the match by 3–02 to 1–03 to claim their first championship title.

== Results ==
=== All-Ireland Junior Hurling Championship ===
==== All-Ireland semi-finals ====
2 August 1964 Semi-final	Down	2-08 - 1-10	Roscommon	St. Coman's Park

9 August 1964 Semi-final	Kerry	2-11 - 2-07	Wicklow	Austin Stack Park

==== All-Ireland home final ====
13 September 1964 Home final	Down	9-05 - 2-07	Kerry	Croke Park

==== All-Ireland final ====
4 October 1964 Final	London	1-03 - 3-02	Down	New Eltham
