= 1925 Cork Intermediate Football Championship =

Gaelic football competition

- Champions: Mitchelstown (2nd title); M. O'Brien (captain)
- Runners-up: Kilmurry; D. Donovan (captain)

The 1925 Cork Intermediate Football Championship was the 16th staging of the Cork Intermediate Football Championship since its establishment by the Cork County Board in 1909.

The final was played on 20 December 1925 at Riverstown Sportsfield, between Mitchelstown and Kilmurry, in what was their first ever meeting in the final. Mitchelstown won the match by 3–04 to 0–01 to claim their second championship title overall and a first championship title in 14 years.

== Results ==
=== Final ===
20 December 1925 Final	Mitchelstown	3-04 - 0-01	Kilmurry	Riverstown Sportsfield
