= 1964 All-Ireland Junior Football Championship =

All Ireland Champions
- Winners: Cork (4th win)
- Captain: Connie Kelleher

All Ireland Runners-up
- Runners-up: London

Provincial Champions
- Munster: Cork
- Leinster: Meath
- Ulster: Derry
- Connacht: Roscommon

The 1964 All-Ireland Junior Football Championship was the 43rd staging of the All-Ireland Junior Championship since its establishment by the Gaelic Athletic Association in 1912.

Kerry entered the championship as the defending champions, however, they were beaten by Cork in the Munster semi-final.

The All-Ireland final was played on 18 October 1964 at the Athletic Grounds in Cork, between Cork and London, in what was their first ever meeting in the final. Cork won the match by 1–08 to 2–04 to claim their fourth championship title overall and a first tile in nine years.

== Results ==
=== All-Ireland Junior Football Championship ===
==== All-Ireland semi-finals ====
16 August 1964 Semi-final	Roscommon	2-02 - 3-13	Cork	Dr. Hyde Park

16 August 1964 Semi-final	Derry	2-08 - 2-12	Meath	Ballinascreen Sportsground

==== All-Ireland home final ====
13 September 1964 Home final	Cork	2-05 - 1-08	Meath	Cork Athletic Grounds

4 October 1964 Home final replay	Cork	2-09 - 0-10	Meath	O'Moore Park

==== All-Ireland final ====
18 October 1964 Final	Cork	1-08 - 2-04	London	Cork Athletic Grounds
