= Rónán McGregor =

Irish hurler

Personal information
- Native name: Rónán Mac Griogair (Irish)
- Born: 1983 (age 42–43) Cork, Ireland
- Occupation: Bank official
- Height: 5 ft 11 in (180 cm)

Sport
- Sport: Hurling
- Position: Midfield
Club
- Years: Club
- Na Piarsaigh
Club titles
- Cork titles: 1
College
- Years: College
- 2001-2005: University College Cork
College titles
- Fitzgibbon titles: 0
Inter-county*
Years	County	Apps (scores)
2005-2006	Cork	0 (0-00)
Inter-county titles
- Munster titles: 1
- All-Irelands: 1
- NHL: 0
- All Stars: 0
- *Inter County team apps and scores correct as of 18:32, 24 February 2022.

Rónán McGregor (born 1983) is an Irish former hurler. At club level he played with Na Piarsaigh and was also a member of the Cork senior hurling team. McGregor usually lined out in defence or at midfield.

== Career ==
McGregor first came to hurling prominence at juvenile and underage levels with Na Piarsaigh. He simultaneously lined out with the North Monastery in the Harty Cup before progressing onto the Na Piarsaigh senior team. He won a Cork SHC title in 2004 after beating Cloyne in the final. McGregor also represented University College Cork in the Fitzgibbon Cup competition and was eventually noticed by inter-county selectors. He was included on the Cork under-21 hurling team in 2004 before earning inclusion on the senior team the following year. McGregor made a number of the National League appearances and was an unused substitute when Cork beat Galway in the 2005 All-Ireland final. He was released from the Cork panel in February 2006.

== Career statistics ==
Team	Year	National League			Munster		All-Ireland		Total	
Team	Year	Division	Apps	Score	Apps	Score	Apps	Score	Apps	Score
Cork	2005	Division 1B	4	0-02	0	0-00	0	0-00	4	0-02
Career total			4	0-02	0	0-00	0	0-00	4	0-02

== Honours ==
Na Piarsaigh

- Cork Senior Hurling Championship: 2004

Cork

- All-Ireland Senior Hurling Championship: 2005
- Munster Senior Hurling Championship: 2005
