= 1990 Cork Senior Football Championship =

Gaelic football competition

- Dates: 20 April – 4 November 1990
- Teams: 21
- Champions: Duhallow (2nd title); Danny Culloty (captain); John Fintan Daly (manager)
- Runners-up: St. Finbarr's; Christy Ryan (captain); Donal Murray (manager)

Tournament statistics
- Matches played: 23
- Goals scored: 48 (2.09 per match)
- Points scored: 433 (18.83 per match)
- Top scorer(s): Colm O'Neill (0-21); Dave Barry (0-21)

The 1990 Cork Senior Football Championship was the 102nd staging of the Cork Senior Football Championship since its establishment by the Cork County Board in 1887. The draw for the opening round fixtures took place on 17 December 1989. The championship began on 20 April 1990 and ended on 4 November 1990.

Castlehaven entered the championship as the defending champions, however, they were defeated by Muskerry in the second round.

On 4 November 1990, Duhallow won the championship following an 0-08 to 0-06 defeat of St. Finbarr's in the final. This was their second championship title overall and their first title since 1936.

Colm O'Neill and Dave Barry were the championship's joint top scorers with 0-21.

== Team changes ==
=== To Championship ===
Promoted from the Cork Intermediate Football Championship

- Rockchapel

== Results ==
=== First round ===
20 April 1990 First round	University College Cork	1-11 - 2-06	St Michael's	Ballinlough
	C O'Dwyer 0-4, A Kelly 1-0, D Ahern 0-3, N Kelleher 0-1, M Finnegan 0-1, P Kenneally 0-1, N Savage 0-1.		F Delaney 1-3, P Kiely 1-0, J Cashman 0-1, I Ahern 0-1, P Fitzgerald 0-1.	Referee: J O'Leary (Na Piarsaigh)

22 April 1990 First round	Carrigdhoun	1-10 - 1-09	Rockchapel	Millstreet
	C O'Donovan 1-3, R O'Sullivan 0-2, A Croweley 0-2, D Fitzgerald 0-1, TJ Deasy 0-1, J O'Callaghan 0-1.		Jerry Casey 0-6, D O'Mahony 1-0, Joe Casey 0-2, T Carroll 0-1.	Referee: P O'Brien (Mallow)

22 April 1990 First round	Na Piarsaigh	0-13 - 1-10	Kilshannig	Watergrasshill
	L Forde 0-3, T O'Sullivan 0-2, C Connery 0-2, D Sheehan 0-2, M Dineen 0-1, G Daly 0-1, D O'Reilly 0-1, J O'Connor 0-1.		W O'Riordan 1-4, M O'Sullivan 0-2, P O'Connell 0-2, D O'Connell 0-1, G Creedon 0-1.	Referee: N Barrett (Carrigtwohill)

22 April 1990 First round	Beara	1-14 - 1-08	Seandún	Aughaville
	C O'Sullivan 1-5, M Harrington 0-4, O O'Sullivan 0-2, D Harrington 0-1, J O'Shea 0-1, J Power 0-1.		K O'Brien 0-6, G Murphy 1-0, M Higgins 0-1, D Sheehan 0-1.	Referee: M Brosnan (Caheragh)

29 April 1990 First round replay	Na Piarsaigh	1-14 - 0-06	Kilshannig	Watergrasshill
	G Daly 1-1, D Sheehan 0-4, T O'Sullivan 0-3, C O'Donovan 0-2, J O'Sullivan 0-1, L Forde 0-1, T Guest 0-1, C Coughlan 0-1.		W O'Riordan 0-2, D O'Connell 0-1, M O'Sullivan 0-1, M Murphy 0-1, E O'Sullivan 0-1.	Referee: N Barrett (Carrigtwohill)

2 June 1990 First round	Carbery	1-06 - 0-08	Bishopstown	Macroom
	K O'Sullivan 1-0, J Caulfield 0-2, P Goggin 0-2, B O'Herlihy 0-1, T Buckley 0-1.		P McGrath 0-6, B Coffey 0-1, R Oldham 0-1.	Referee: R Murphy (Lyre)

=== Second round ===
29 April 1989 Second round	Castlehaven	1-08 - 0-14	Muskerry	Charlie Hurley Park, Bandon
	J Cleary 1-4, M O'Mahony 0-3, E Cleary 0-1.		J Ring 0-3, J O'Driscoll 0-3, G McPolin 0-3, T O'Reilly 0-2, K Creed 0-1, M Kelleher 0-1, J O'Connor 0-1.	Referee: J O'Leary (Na Piarsaigh)

29 April 1990 Second round	O'Donovan Rossa	5-10 - 1-06	Glanmire	Charlie Hurley Park, Bandon
	M McCarthy 1-6, P Davis 1-1, G Minihane 1-0, T Davis 1-0, I Breen 1-0, D Davis 0-1, G O'Driscoll 0-1, B O'Donovan 0-1.		N Mulvihill 1-2, T McCarthy 0-1, D Kenneally 0-1, R Lotty 0-1, G Murphy 0-1.	Referee: G Harrington (Carrigaline)

25 May 1990 Second round	Clonakilty	1-08 - 1-09	Avondhu	Bishopstown
	T Dillon 1-1, E Ryan 0-3, M o'Donovan 0-2, S Cowhig 0-2.		P Buckley 1-0, C O'Sullivan 0-3, K Stack 0-2, M Dolan 0-2, S Brown 0-1, T Mannix 0-1.	Referee: E Porter (Brian Dillons)

9 June 1990 Second round	Duhallow	2-18 - 2-06	Carrigdhoun	newmarket
	N O'Connor 0-7, D Culloty 1-1, J Walsh 1-1, T Healy 0-3, D O'Connor 0-2, L Dennehy 0-2, R Dennehy 0-1, A BArry 0-1.		J O'Callaghan 1-1, J Dineen 1-0, A Crowley 0-3, C O'Donovan 0-1, P O'Sullivan 0-1.	Referee: S O'Keeffe (St. Michael's)

9 June 1990 Second round	St. Finbarr's	2-16 - 0-10	St. Nicholas'	Páirc Uí Chaoimh, Cork
	T Power 2-2, D Barry 0-8, B Searls 0-2, J Griffin 0-2, P Hayes 0-1, K Scanlon 0-1.		V Hedderman 0-5, G O'Riordan 0-2, C McGuckin 0-2, J Lynch 0-1.	Referee: E Porter (Brian Dillons)

10 June 1990 Second round	Carbery	1-10 - 1-03	Beara	Rossa Park, Skibbereen
	M O'Donovan 1-1, B O'Herlihy 0-3, J Caulfield 0-2, P Goggin 0-1, E Murphy 0-1, J Cotter 0-1, E Kenneally 0-1.		MM O'Sullivan 1-0, C O'Sullivan 0-1, Martin O'Sullivan 0-1, Oliver O'Sullivan 0-1.	Referee: D Collins (Kinsale)

15 June 1990 Second round	Nemo Rangers	1-12 - 1-05	University College Cork	Páirc Uí Chaoimh, Cork
	E O'Mahony 0-5, D Allen 1-1, M Dorgan 0-2, G O'Regan 0-2, D O'Sullivan 0-1, S Calnan 0-1.		M Finnegan 1-0, N Donlon 0-2, C O'Dwyer 0-1, D Ahern 0-1, P Kenneally 0-1.	Referee: M English (Bishopstown)

16 June 1990 Second round	Na Piarsaigh	2-06 - 0-16	Imokilly	Fitzgerald Park, Fermoy
	J O'Connor 1-0, G Daly 1-0, Mick Mullins 0-3, Mark Mullins 0-2, J Twomey 0-1.		C O'Neill 0-9, N O'Neill 0-2, M Hennessy 0-1, K Murphy 0-1, D Walsh 0-1, G Glavin 0-1, A Berry 0-1.	Referee: D Casey (Ballyclough)

=== Quarter-finals ===
14 July 1990 Quarter-final	Carbery	2-05 - 0-11	St. Finbarr's	Clonakilty
	J Caulfield 1-4, M O'Donovan 1-1.		D Barry 0-4, T Leahy 0-2, P Hayes 0-1, E Barrett 0-1, J Griffin 0-1, M Slocum 0-1, T Power 0-1.	Referee: D Collins (Kinsale)

21 July 1990 Quarter-final	Nemo Rangers	0-14 - 0-14	Imokilly	Castlelyons
	S Calnan 0-4, G O'Regan 0-3, E O'Mahony 0-2, D Allen 0-2, S Fahy 0-1, T Nation 0-1, D o'Sullivan 0-1.		C O'Neill 0-7, K Murphy 0-2, M Lewis 0-2, B Tynan 0-1, A O'Brien 0-1, G Glavin 0-1.	Referee: M Keane (Cloughduv)

21 July 1990 Quarter-final	Muskerry	1-17 - 0-08	Avondhu	Páirc Uí Chaoimh, Cork
	T O'Reilly 1-2, N Twomey 0-4, J Ring 0-3, M Kelleher 0-2, G Manley 0-2, J O'Driscoll 0-2, S Coughlan 0-1, C O'Connell 0-1.		C O'Sullivan 0-3, K Stack 0-2, R Sheehan 0-1, M O'Shea 0-1, W Frawley 0-1.	Referee: S O'Keeffe (St. Michael's)

29 July 1990 Quarter-final	Duhallow	2-11 - 1-05	O'Donovan Rossa	Rusheen
	N O'Connor 0-5, L Dennehy 1-1, D Culloty 1-0, D O'Connor 0-3, N Moynihan 0-1, T Healy 0-1.		M McCarthy 1-4, T Davis 0-1.	Referee: S O'Keeffe (St. Michael's)

18 August 1990 Quarter-final replay	St. Finbarr's	3-10 - 1-05	Carbery	Clonakilty
	D Barry 0-5, T Power 1-1, C Ryan 1-0, M Slocum 1-0, J Griffin 0-2, T Leahy 0-1, B Searls 0-1.		E Murphy 1-0, J Caulfield 0-2, M O'Connor 0-1, J Cotter 0-1, P Goggin 0-1.	Referee: D Collins (Kinsale)

18 August 1990 Quarter-final replay	Nemo Rangers	1-15 - 0-05	Imokilly	Castlelyons
	D Allen 1-0, J Kavanagh 0-3, T Nation 0-3, S Calnan 0-3, D O'Sullivan 0-3, P O'Donovan 0-2, J Kerrigan 0-1.		C O'Neill 0-5.	Referee: M Keane (Cloughduv)

=== Semi-finals ===
23 September 1990 Semi-final	Duhallow	4-05 - 1-09	Nemo Rangers	Macroom
	A Barry 1-1, J Dennehy 1-1, T Healy 1-0, R Dennehy 1-0, Donal O'Connor 0-2, D Culloty 0-1.		D O'Sullivan 0-5, M Dorgan 1-1, D Allen 0-1, S Calnan 0-1, J Kerrigan 0-1.	Referee: F Murphy

30 September 1990 Semi-final	St. Finbarr's	1-08 - 0-05	Muskerry	Charlie Hurley Park, Bandon
	P Hayes 1-0, T Leahy 0-3, D Barry 0-2, T Power 0-1, J Griffin 0-1, C Ryan 0-1.		J O'Driscoll 0-2, G McPolin 0-1, N Twomey 0-1, M Kelleher 0-1.	Referee: P O'Donovan (Bantry Blues)

=== Final ===
4 November 1990 Final	Duhallow	0-08 - 0-06	St. Finbarr's	Páirc Uí Chaoimh, Cork
	A Barry 0-3, J Dennehy 0-2, T Healy 0-1, D O'Connor 0-1, N O'Connor 0-1.		D Barry 0-2, T Power 0-2, J Griffin 0-1, T Leahy 0-1.	Attendance: 10,979; Referee: J O'Leary (Na Piarsaigh)

== Championship statistics ==
=== Top scorers ===
Top scorers overall

Rank	Player	Club	Tally	Total	Matches	Average
1	Colm O'Neill	Imokilly	0-21	21	3	7.00
1	Dave Barry	St. Finbarr's	0-21	21	5	4.20
3	Tony Power	St. Finbarr's	3-07	16	5	3.20
3	Mick McCarthy	O'Donovan Rossa	2-10	16	2	8.00
5	John Caulfield	Carbery	1-10	13	4	3.25
5	Niall O'Connor	Duhallow	0-13	13	4	3.25
7	Dinny Allen	Nemo Rangers	2-04	10	4	2.50
7	Denis O'Sullivan	Nemo Rangers	0-10	10	4	2.50
9	Ciarán O'Sullivan	Beara	1-06	9	2	4.50
9	William O'Riordan	Kilshannig	1-06	9	2	4.50
9	Stephen Calnan	Nemo Rangers	0-09	9	4	2.25

Top scorers in a single game

Rank	Player	Club	Tally	Total	Opposition
1	Mick McCarthy	O'Donovan Rossa	1-06	9	Glanmire
1	Colm O'Neill	Imokilly	0-09	9	Na Piarsaigh
3	Tony Power	St. Finbarr's	2-02	8	St. Nicholas'
3	Ciarán O'Sullivan	Beara	1-05	8	Seandún
3	Dave Barry	St. Finbarr's	0-08	8	St. Nicholas'
6	William O'Riordan	Kilshannig	1-04	7	Na Piarsaigh
6	John Cleary	Castlehaven	1-04	7	Muskerry
6	John Caulfield	Carbery	1-04	7	St. Finbarr's
6	Mick McCarthy	O'Donovan Rossa	1-04	7	Duhallow
6	Colm O'Neill	Imokilly	0-07	7	Nemo Rangers
6	Niall O'Connor	Duhallow	0-07	7	Carrigdhoun

=== Miscellaneous ===
- On 22 April 1990, Carrigdhoun recorded their first championship victory since 1968.
- Duhallow, then Duhallow West, win the title for the first time since 1936. The gap of 54 years was the longest gap between titles at the time.
