= 1965 Cork Intermediate Football Championship =

1965 football tournament

- Dates: 18 April - 10 October 1965
- Teams: 11
- Champions: Mitchelstown (4th title)
- Runners-up: St. Vincent's

Tournament statistics
- Matches played: 10

The 1965 Cork Intermediate Football Championship was the 30th staging of the Cork Intermediate Football Championship since its establishment by the Cork County Board in 1909. The draw for the opening round fixtures took place on 31 January 1965. The championship ran from 18 April to 10 October 1965. It was the first championship to be completed since 1938.

The final was played on 10 October 1965 at Clonmult Memorial Park in Midleton, between Mitcheltown and St. Vincent's, in what was their first ever meeting in the final. Mitchelstown won the match by 2-08 to 1-05 to claim their fourth championship title overall and a first title in 36 years.

== Results ==
=== Quarter-finals ===
30 May 1965 Quarter-final	Mitchelstown	2-10 - 1-06	Delaneys	Páirc Mac Gearailt

13 June 1965 Quarter-final	Kiskeam	0-10 - 1-05	Douglas	O'Connell Park

18 July 1965 Quarter-final	Urhan	2-13 - 2-03	Fermoy	Sam Maguire Park

8 August 1965 Quarter-final	St. Vincent's	0-13 - 0-04	Lees	Cork Athletic Grounds

=== Semi-finals ===
22 August 1965 Semi-final	Mitchelstown	1-05 - 0-03	Kiskeam	Fr. Con Buckley Park

12 September 1965 Semi-final	St. Vincent's	1-07 - 0-05	Urhan	Sam Maguire Park

=== Final ===
10 October 1965 Final	Mitchelstown	2-08 - 1-05	St. Vincent's	Clonmult Memorial Park
	M Barrett 1-6, T Monaghan 1-1, M Burke 0-1.		C O'Shea 1-1, P Barry 0-3, D Ryan 0-1.	Referee: J Lotty (Glanmire)
