= Tommy Burke =

Irish Gaelic football player

Personal information
- Native name: Tomás de Búrca (Irish)
- Born: 1943 (age 82–83) Millstreet, County Cork, Ireland

Sport
- Sport: Gaelic football
- Position: Right corner-forward
Club
- Years: Club
- Millstreet
Inter-county
- Years: County
- 1965: Cork

Tommy Burke (born 1943) is an Irish retired Gaelic footballer who played as a right corner-forward for the Cork senior football team.

Born in Millstreet, County Cork, Burke first played competitive football in his youth. He arrived on the inter-county scene at the age of seventeen when he first linked up with the Cork minor team, before later joining the under-21 side. He joined the senior panel during the 1965 championship and enjoyed a brief one-year inter-county career.

At club level Burke is a one-time junior championship medallist with Millstreet.

== Honours ==
=== Team ===
Millstreet

- Cork Junior Football Championship (1): 1963

Cork

- Munster Under-21 Football Championship (1): 1963 (sub)
- All-Ireland Minor Football Championship (1): 1961
- Munster Minor Football Championship (2): 1960 (sub), 1961
