= 1981 All-Ireland Under-21 Football Championship =

Gaelic football competition

Championship details

All-Ireland Champions
- Winning team: Cork (4th win)
- Captain: Seán Hayes

All-Ireland Finalists
- Losing team: Galway

Provincial Champions
- Munster: Cork
- Leinster: Louth
- Ulster: Monaghan
- Connacht: Galway

The 1981 All-Ireland Under-21 Football Championship was the 18th staging of the All-Ireland Under-21 Football Championship since its establishment by the Gaelic Athletic Association in 1964.

Cork entered the championship as defending champions.

On 8 November 1981, Cork won the championship following a 2-9 to 1-6 defeat of Galway in a replay of the All-Ireland final. This was their fourth All-Ireland title overall and their second in successive seasons.

== Results ==
=== Leinster Under-21 Football Championship ===
19 July 1981
Final

Louth	2-08 - 0-06	Longford
Cluskey 1-1, Carr 1-1, Berrill 0-3, McCarragher 0-1, Callaghan 0-1, Rafferty 0-1		Culhane 0-2, McCormack 0-2, Cheevers 0-1, Maguire 0-1

Croke Park, Dublin
Referee: Séamus Aldridge (Kildare)

GK	1	Eugene McArdle (Dundalk Young Irelands)
RCB	2	Liam Reilly (Cooley Kickhams)
FB	3	Declan Healy (Naomh Máirtín)
LCB	4	Kevin Byrne (St Bride's)
RHB	5	Fergal Judge (Newtown Blues)
CHB	6	Tony McCarragher (Cooley Kickhams)
LHB	7	Peter Fitzpatrick (Clan na Gael)
MF	8	Pat McConnon (Dundalk Young Irelands) (c)
MF	9	Dessie Callaghan (Newtown Blues)
RHF	10	Noel Cluskey (Seán McDermott's)
CHF	11	Paul McGee (Roche Emmets)
LHF	12	Frank Brannigan (St Fechin's)
RCF	13	Martin Carr (Newtown Blues)
FF	14	Pat Smith (O'Raghallaighs)
LCF	15	Jimmy Berrill (Naomh Máirtín)
Substitutes:
	16	Noel Healy (Naomh Máirtín) for Smith
	17	Enda Rafferty (Cooley Kickhams) for Brannigan

GK	1	Hubert Smith (Longford Slashers)
RCB	2	Jimmy Halpin (Longford Slashers)
FB	3	Donal Mullooly (Rathcline)
LCB	4	Declan Clabby (Forgney St Munis)
RHB	5	Philip Smith (Granard St Mary's)
CHB	6	Michael Sexton (Longford Slashers)
LHB	7	Dessie Barry (Longford Slashers)
MF	8	Brendan Lennon (Killoe Young Emmets)
MF	9	Pádraig Carberry (Cashel)
RHF	10	David Breslin (Fr. Manning Gaels)
CHF	11	Richie Culhane (Newtown Blues, Louth)
LHF	12	John McCormack (Killoe Young Emmets)
RCF	13	Richard Cheevers (Rathcline)
FF	14	Frank O'Hara (Seán Connolly's)
LCF	15	Denis Maguire (Dromard)
Substitutes:
	16	John Keegan (St Patrick's) for Breslin
	17	Michael Kenny (Abbeylara) for O'Hara

=== All-Ireland Under-21 Football Championship ===
Semi-finals

27 September 1981 Semi-final	Galway	3-08 - 1-06	Louth	Croke Park, Dublin

27 September 1981 Semi-final	Cork	2-12 - 1-10	Monaghan	Croke Park, Dublin

Finals

11 October 1981 Final	Cork	0-14 - 2-08	Galway	Cusack Park, Ennis

8 November 1981 Final replay	Cork	2-09 - 1-06	Galway	Cusack Park, Ennis

== Statistics ==
=== Miscellaneous ===
- Monaghan win the Ulster title for the first time in their history.
- The All-Ireland semi-finals see two first time championship pairings as Cork play Monaghan for the very first time and Louth play Galway for the very first and only time in the history of the championship.
