= 1929 Cork Intermediate Football Championship =

Gaelic football competition

- Champions: MItchelstown (3rd title)
- Runners-up: Owenabue

The 1929 Cork Intermediate Football Championship was the 20th staging of the Cork Intermediate Football Championship since its establishment by the Cork County Board in 1909.

The final was played on 3 November 1929 at the Mardyke in Cork, between Mitchelstown and Owenabue, in what was their first ever meeting in the final. Mitchelstown won the match by 1–03 to 0–02 to claim their third championship title overall and a first championship title in four years.

== Results ==
=== Final ===
3 November 1929 Final	Mitchelstown	1-03 - 0-02	Owenabue	The Mardyke
