= 1911 Cork Intermediate Football Championship =

Gaelic football competition

- Champions: Mitchelstown (1st title)
- Runners-up: O'Briens

The 1911 Cork Intermediate Football Championship was the third staging of the Cork Intermediate Football Championship since its establishment by the Cork County Board in 1909.

The final was played on 3 September 1911 at the Town Park in Mallow, between Mitchelstown and O'Briens, in what was their first ever meeting in the final. Mitchelstown won the match by 2–05 to 0–00 to claim their first ever championship title.

== Results ==
=== Final ===
3 September 1911 Final	Mitchelstown	2-05 - 0-00	O'Briens	Mallow Town Park
