= 1965 Cork Junior Football Championship =

- Dates: 24 October – 12 December 1965
- Teams: 8
- Champions: Na Piarsaigh (1st title)
- Runners-up: Dohenys

Tournament statistics
- Matches played: 7
- Goals scored: 17 (2.43 per match)
- Points scored: 61 (8.71 per match)

The 1965 Cork Junior Football Championship was the 67th staging of the Cork Junior A Football Championship since its establishment by Cork County Board in 1895. The championship ran from 24 October to 12 December 1965.

The final was played on 12 December 1965 at the Castle Grounds in Macroom, between Na Piarsaigh and Dohenys, in what was their first ever meeting in the final. Na Piarsaigh won the match by 1–03 to 0–04 to claim their first ever championship title.

== Qualification ==
| Division | Championship | Champions |
|---|---|---|
| Avondhu | North Cork Junior A Football Championship | Kilshannig |
| Beara | Beara Junior A Football Championship | Castletownbere |
| Carbery | South West Junior A Football Championship | Dohenys |
| Carrigdhoun | South East Junior A Football Championship | Kinsale |
| Duhallow | Duhallow Junior A Football Championship | Newmarket |
| Imokilly | East Cork Junior A Football Championship | Glanmire |
| Muskerry | Mid Cork Junior A Football Championship | Béal Átha'n Ghaorthaidh |
| Seandún | City Junior A Football Championship | Na Piarsaigh |

== Results ==
=== Quarter-finals ===
| 24 October 1965 Quarter-final | Béal Átha'n Ghaorthaidh | 1–06 – 1–04 | Glanmire | Coachford Sportsfield |

| 24 October 1965 Quarter-final | Kinsale | 2–06 – 2–04 | Castletownbere | Rossa Park |

| 8 November 1965 Quarter-final | Kilshannig | 1–06 – 1–06 | Dohenys | Castle Grounds |

| 15 November 1965 Quarter-final replay | Kilshannig | 0–01 – 0–02 | Dohenys | Castle Grounds |

=== Semi-finals ===
| 21 November 1965 Semi-final | Dohenys | 2–06 – 1–05 | Kinsale | Charlie Hurley Park |
| | Eamon Young 0–4, K Young 1–0, B Shorten 1–0, Edda Young 0–1, H McCullogh 0–1. | | J Murphy 1–0, E Page 0-2, B Greenway 0–1, M O'Donoghue 0–1, J Murphy 0–1. |

| 21 November 1965 Semi-final | Na Piarsaigh | 5–02 – 0–06 | Béal Átha'n Ghaorthaidh | Coachford Sportsfield |
| | M O'Meara 2–0, T Nott 1–2, D O'Leary 1–0, J Buckley 1–0. | | T Prendergast 0–2, J Galvin 0–2, S O'Sullivan 0–1, N McCarthy 0–1. |

=== Final ===
| 12 December 1965 Final | Na Piarsaigh | 1–03 – 0–04 | Dohenys | Castle Grounds |
| | D Leary 1–1, T Nott 0–2. | | Eamon Young 0–2, P Smith 0–1, B Short 0–1. |
