= Donal Sheehan =

Irish hurler (1940–2021)

Personal information
- Native name: Dónall Ó Síocháin (Irish)
- Nickname: Fox
- Born: 1940 Farranree, Cork, Ireland
- Died: 18 July 2021 (aged 81) Wilton, Cork, Ireland
- Height: 5 ft 10 in (178 cm)

Sport
- Sport: Hurling
- Position: Centre-forward
Club
- Years: Club
- Na Piarsaigh
Club titles
- Cork titles: 0
Inter-county
Years	County	Apps (scores)
1962–1966	Cork	6 (2–01)
Inter-county titles
- Munster titles: 1
- All-Irelands: 1
- NHL: 0

Donal Sheehan (1940 – 18 July 2021) was an Irish hurler. He played hurling at club level with Na Piarsaigh and at inter-county level as a member of the Cork senior hurling team.

== Career ==
Sheehan joined the Na Piarsaigh club at a young age and played in all grades up to senior before being drafted onto the Cork senior hurling team. He made his first appearance for team as a centre-forward during the 1962 Munster Championship. Sheehan was off and on the team at various times over the following few seasons and was a non-playing substitute when the team won the All-Ireland Championship in 1966. He had earlier won a Munster Championship medal as a substitute.

== Death ==
Sheehan died at Cork University Hospital on 18 July 2021.

== Honours ==
Na Piarsaigh

- Cork Intermediate Football Championship: 1966

Cork

- All-Ireland Senior Hurling Championship: 1966
- Munster Senior Hurling Championship: 1966
