= 1963 All-Ireland Junior Hurling Championship =

1963 inter-county junior hurling championship

All Ireland Champions
- Winners: London (5th win)

All Ireland Runners-up
- Runners-up: Antrim

Provincial Champions
- Munster: Not Played
- Leinster: Westmeath
- Ulster: Antrim
- Connacht: Roscommon

The 1963 All-Ireland Junior Hurling Championship was the 42nd staging of the All-Ireland Junior Championship since its establishment by the Gaelic Athletic Association in 1912.

Kildare entered the championship as the defending champions, however, they were beaten in the Leinster Championship.

The All-Ireland final was played on 29 September 1963 at Casement Park in Belfast, between London and Antrim, in what was their second meeting in the final. London won the match by 4–07 to 3–06 to claim their fifth championship title.

== Results ==
=== All-Ireland Junior Hurling Championship ===
==== All-Ireland semi-finals ====
11 August 1963 Semi-final	Kerry	8-09 - 2-03	Westmeath	Cusack Park

11 August 1963 Semi-final	Antrim	4-02 - 1-07	Roscommon	Casement Park

==== All-Ireland home final ====
8 September 1963 Home final	Antrim	6-03 - 8-08	Westmeath	Páirc Tailteann

==== All-Ireland final ====
29 September 1963 Final	Antrim	3-06 - 4-07	London	Casement Park
