= 2020 All-Ireland Under-20 Football Championship =

Gaelic Football competition

Championship details
- Dates: 7 February – 19 December 2020
- Teams: 31

All-Ireland Champions
- Winning team: Galway (6th win)
- Captain: Jack Glynn
- Manager: Dónal Ó Fátharta

All-Ireland Finalists
- Losing team: Dublin
- Captain: Rory Dwyer
- Manager: Tom Gray

Provincial Champions
- Munster: Kerry
- Leinster: Dublin
- Ulster: Tyrone
- Connacht: Galway

Championship statistics
- No. matches played: 30
- Goals total: 50 (1.67 per game)
- Points total: 593 (19.77 per game)
- Top Scorer: Ciarán Archer (1–25)
- Player of the Year: Jack Glynn

The 2020 All-Ireland Under-20 Football Championship was the third staging of the All-Ireland Under-20 Championship and the 57th staging overall of a Gaelic football championship for players between the minor and senior grades. The competition ran from 7 February to 19 December 2020.

The defending champion was Cork; however, the team was beaten by Kerry in the Munster final.

The final took place on 19 December 2020, between Galway and Dublin. Galway won the match by 1–11 to 0–13 to win asixth title and a first since 2013.

Dublin's Ciarán Archer was the competition's top scorer with 1–25. Galway captain Jack Glynn was named U20 Footballer of the Year.

== Player eligibility ==
At the start of the championship footballers aged under 20 cannot play for both their county's senior and under-20 championship teams. Initially a footballer must opt to play for either the senior or the under-20 team. Once a county's senior team exits the senior championship all of their under-20 players are then eligible to play for the county under-20 team.

This rule was introduced to prevent player burnout and avoid scheduling conflicts when the senior and under-20 championships are played in the same summer months as both county teams have distinct panels of players. Inevitably some county under-20 teams play without their best under-20 footballers as a result of the player eligibility rule.

== Competition format ==
Provincial Championships format

Connacht, Leinster, Munster and Ulster each organise a provincial championship. Each province decides the format for their championship – the format can be straight knockout, double-elimination, a league, groups, etc. or a combination.

All-Ireland format

The four provincial winners play in two All-Ireland Under-20 Football Semi-finals, with the winners of those matches playing in the All-Ireland Final.

== Connacht Under-20 Football Championship ==
=== Quarter-final ===
8 February 2020 Quarter-final	Mayo	0–14 – 1–11 (a.e.t.) (2–3 p)	Galway	Castlebar
14:00 IST (UTC+0)	Paul Towey 0–9 (0–3f), Frank Irwin 0–2 (0–1f), Ciaran Gavin 0–1 (0–1f), James Jennings 0–1 (0–1m), Paddy Goldrick 0–1	Report	Matthew Tierney 1–2 (0–2f), Tony Gill 0–3, Ryan Monaghan 0–2, Cathal Sweeney 0–1, Nathan Grainger 0–1, Tomo Culhane 0–1, Matthew Cooley 0–1	Stadium: Elverys MacHale Park; Referee: Barry Judge (Sligo)

=== Semi-finals ===
15 February 2020 Semi-final	Sligo	1–08 – 1–11	Roscommon	Sligo
14:00 IST (UTC+0)	Red Óg Murphy 1–2 (1–0 pen, 0–2f), Gavin Duffy 0–2 (0–1m), Conor Murray 0–2, Eoghan Smith 0–1, Alan Reilly 0–1	Report	Adam McDermott 1–1 (0–1f), Ciaran Lawless 0–2 (0–2 '45), Peter Gillooly 0–2 (0–2f), Paul Carey 0–2 (0–1f), Andrew Lyons 0–1 (0–1m), Cian Murray 0–1, Keith Doyle 0–1, Darragh Walsh 0–1	Stadium: Markievicz Park; Referee: Tadhg Murphy (Galway)

22 February 2020 Semi-final	Leitrim	0–2 – 1–12	Galway	Elphin
14:00 IST (UTC+0)	Oisin McLoughlin 0–1 (0–1f), Tom Prior 0–1	Report	Cathal Sweeney 0–3, Matthew Cooley 1–0, Matthew Tierney 0–2 (0–2f), Jack Glynn 0–1, Cian Monaghan 0–1, Conor Raftery 0–1, Ryan Monaghan 0–1, Paul Kelly 0–1, Alan Greene 0–1, Eoin Mannion 0–1	Stadium: Orchard Park; Referee: Patrick McTiernan (Roscommon)

=== Final ===
7 March 2020 Final	Galway	4–13 – 0–5	Roscommon	Tuam
14:00 IST (UTC+0)	Ryan Monaghan 1–2, Matthew Tierney 0–4 (0–2f, 0–1 '45), Tomo Culhane 1–1 (1–0f), Cathal Sweeney 0–3, Cian Monaghan 1–0, Jonathan McGrath 1–0, Tony Gill 0–1, Alan Greene 0–1, Eoin Mannion 0–1	Report	Paul McManus 0–2, Thomas O'Rourke 0–1 (0–1f), Darragh Walsh 0–1, Ciaran Lawless 0–1	Stadium: Tuam Stadium; Referee: Declan Corcoran (Mayo); Man of the Match: Cathal Sweeney (Galway)

== Leinster Under-20 Football Championship ==
=== Preliminary round ===
7 February 2020 Preliminary round	Wexford	3–8 – 2–9	Carlow	Enniscorthy
20:00 IST (UTC+0)	Colum Feeney 0–5 (0–4f, 0–1 '45), Todd Hynes 1–1, Paraic Hughes 1–0, Tomás Murphy 1–0, Shane Pettit 0–2	Report	Andrew Keogh 0–5 (0–3f, 0–1m), Jamie Lunney 1–0, Cathal O'Neill 1–0, Ronan Curran 0–2, Cormac Lomax 0–1, Cian Doyle 0–1	Stadium: St Patrick's Park; Referee: Patrick Maguire (Longford)

8 February 2020 Preliminary round	Louth	0–9 – 2–6	Offaly	Dunleer
14:00 IST (UTC+0)	Carl Gillespie 0–6 (0–4f, 0–1m), Luke Matthews 0–2, Ciarán Keenan 0–1 (0–1f)	Report	Sean Courtney 2–0, Aaron Kellaghan 0–3 (0–1f), Cathal Flynn 0–1, Cormac Delaney 0–1, Mikey Cunningham 0–1	Stadium: Páirc Uí Mhuirí; Referee: Barry Tiernan (Dublin)

8 February 2020 Preliminary round	Wicklow	1–7 – 1–17	Dublin	Aughrim
14:00 IST (UTC+0)	Eoin Darcy 1–0, Johnny Keogh 0–2 (0–1 '45), Matthew Ging 0–2, Eoghan Byrne 0–1, James Hedderman 0–1, Kevin Quinn 0–1	Report	Ciarán Archer 0–5 (0–1f), Luke Swan 0–3 (0–1f), Adam Fearon 1–0, Kieran McKeon 0–2, Padraig Purcell 0–2, Alan Murphy 0–1, Ciaran O'Reilly 0–1, Mark Lavin 0–1, Rory Dwyer 0–1, Sean Foran 0–1	Stadium: Joule Park; Referee: John Hickey (Carlow)

=== Quarter-finals ===
15 February 2020 Quarter-final	Dublin	3–10 – 0–9	Longford	Dublin
14:00 IST (UTC+0)	Ciarán Archer 1–4 (0–3f), Lorcan O'Dell 1–1, Conor Kinsella 1–0, Evan Caulfield 0–1, Killian McGinnis 0–1, Kieran McKeon 0–1, Padraig Purcell 0–1, Luke Murphy Guinane 0–1	Report	Oran Kenny 0–3 (0–3f), Dylan Farrell 0–3 (0–2f), Eoghan McCormack 0–1, Dario Ciglianio 0–1, Aaron Farrell 0–1	Stadium: Parnell Park; Referee: Stephen Johnson (Louth)

15 February 2020 Quarter-final	Wexford	1–5 – 1–12	Meath	Enniscorthy
14:00 IST (UTC+0)	Colum Feeney 0–3 (0–2f), Todd Hynes 1–0, Shane Pettit 0–2 (0–1f)	Report	Shane Walsh 1–3, Jordan Morris 0–2 (0–1m), Jack O'Connor 0–2, Luke Mitchell 0–2, Matthew Costello 0–1, Aaron Lynch 0–1, Conor Farrelly 0–1	Stadium: St Patrick's Park; Referee: Brendan Cawley (Kildare)

15 February 2020 Quarter-final	Kildare	1–7 – 0–9	Offaly	Newbridge
14:00 IST (UTC+0)	Shane O'Sullivan 1–3 (0–3f), Alex Beirne 0–2, Luke Griffin 0–1, Paddy McDermott 0–1	Report	Sean Courtney 0–4 (0–2f), Jack Bryant 0–3 (0–2f), Cathal Flynn 0–1, Kevin McDermott 0–1	Stadium: St Conleth's Park; Referee: Maurice Deegan (Laois)

17 February 2020 Quarter-final	Laois	0–13 – 1–10 (a.e.t.) (4–3 p)	Westmeath	Portlaoise
19:30 IST (UTC+0)	Ronan Coffey 0–4 (0–3f), Mark Barry 0–3 (0–2f, 0–1m), Jack Owens 0–2, Matthew Byron 0–1 (0–1f), Daragh Galvin 0–1 (0–1m), Sean O'Neill 0–1, Jack Lacey 0–1	Report	Kieran Colclough 1–0 (1–0f), Tommy Ryan 0–2 (0–1f, 0–1m), Jason Nugent 0–2, T. J. Cox 0–1 (0–1f), Eoghan Bracken 0–1, Adam Flanagan 0–1, Jack Murtagh 0–1, Sam Maxwell 0–1, Jonathan Lynam 0–1	Stadium: MW Hire O'Moore Park; Referee: Cormac Reilly (Meath)

=== Semi-finals ===
21 February 2020 Semi-final	Laois	1–7 – 0–4	Kildare	Portlaoise
19:30 IST (UTC+0)	Mark Barry 0–4 (0–2f), Damon Larkin 1–0, Matthew Byron 0–1 (0–1f), Ronan Coffey 0–1, Colin Slevin 0–1	Report	Alex Beirne 0–2, Shane O'Sullivan 0–1 (0–1f), Darragh Kirwan 0–1	Stadium: MW Hire O'Moore Park; Referee: Fergal Kelly (Longford)

22 February 2020 Semi-final	Dublin	2–14 – 0–7	Meath	Dublin
14:00 IST (UTC+0)	Lorcan O'Dell 1–2, Luke Swan 1–1, Evan Caulfield 0–3, Mark Lavin 0–2, Ciarán Archer 0–2, Kieran McKeon 0–2, Padraig Purcell 0–2	Report	Luke Mitchell 0–2 (0–2f), Liam Byrne 0–1 (0–1 '45), Jordan Morris 0–1 (0–1f), Daithi McGowan 0–1, Matthew Costello 0–1, Cian Rogers 0–1	Stadium: Parnell Park; Referee: John Hickey (Carlow)

=== Final ===
6 March 2020 Final	Dublin	0–18 – 0–8	Laois	Carlow
19:30 IST (UTC+0)	Ciarán Archer 0–7 (0–3f, 0–2 '45), Kieran McKeon 0–4, Lee Gannon 0–2, Rory Dwyer 0–1, Mark Lavin 0–1, Lorcan O'Dell 0–1, Sean Foran 0–1, Conor Kinsella 0–1	Report	Ronan Coffey 0–4 (0–2f), Matthew Byron 0–3 (0–2f, 0–1 '45), Jack Owens 0–1	Stadium: Netwatch Cullen Park; Referee: Patrick Maguire (Longford); Man of the Match: Lorcan O'Dell (Dublin)

== Munster Under-20 Football Championship ==
=== Quarter-finals ===
19 February 2020 Quarter-final	Limerick	0–7 – 0–6	Tipperary	Rathkeale
19:00 IST (UTC+0)	Eoin O'Mahony 0–2 (0–2m), John Hayes 0–1 (0–1f), James Cummins 0–1, Brian Foley 0–1, Rory O'Brien 0–1, Barry Coleman 0–1	Report	Conor Ryan 0–2, Kyle Shelly 0–1 (0–1f), Kevin Grogan 0–1 (0–1f), Mark O'Meara 0–1, Sean O'Connor 0–1	Stadium: Mick Neville Park; Referee: Padraig O'Sullivan (Kerry)

20 February 2020 Quarter-final	Clare	3–14 – 0–6	Waterford	Milltown Malbay
19:00 IST (UTC+0)	Shane Meehan 2–2 (0–2f), Mark McInerney 1–5 (0–4f), Diarmuid O'Donnell 0–3, Emmet McMahon 0–2, Morgan Garry 0–1, Eoghan Thynne 0–1	Report	Aaron Ryan 0–3 (0–3f), Niall McSweeney 0–2 (0–2f), James Power 0–1	Stadium: Hennessy Memorial Park; Referee: Jonathan Hayes (Limerick)

=== Semi-finals ===
26 February 2020 Semi-final	Clare	2–7 – 1–12	Cork	Milltown Malbay
19:00 IST (UTC+0)	Mark McInerney 1–4 (0–3f), Emmet McMahon 1–1, Shane Meehan 0–1 (0–1f), Eoin Rouine 0–1	Report	Blake Murphy 0–9 (0–7f, 0–1 '45, 0–1m), Jack Murphy 1–0, Mark Cronin 0–2 (0–1f), Fionn Herlihy 0–1	Stadium: Hennessy Memorial Park; Referee: Brendan Griffin (Kerry)

26 February 2020 Semi-final	Limerick	0–7 – 0–14	Kerry	Rathkeale
19:00 IST (UTC+0)	Barry Coleman 0–1, Rory O'Brien 0–1, James Cummins 0–1, James Molyneaux 0–1, Brian Foley 0–1, John Hayes 0–1, Eoin O'Mahony 0–1	Report	Paul Walsh 0–4 (0–3f), Killian Falvey 0–3, Paul O'Shea 0–2, Luke Brosnan 0–1, Michael O'Gara 0–1, Patrick Darcy 0–1, Ruaidhrí Ó Beaglaoich 0–1, Sean Quilter 0–1	Stadium: Mick Neville Park; Referee: Chris Maguire (Clare)

=== Final ===
4 March 2020 Final	Kerry	0–17 – 1–9	Cork	Tralee
19:30 IST (UTC+0)	Ruaidhrí Ó Beaglaoich 0–5 (0–2f, 0–1m), Paul Walsh 0–3 (0–3f), Sean Quilter 0–2 (0–1f), Patrick Darcy 0–2, Darragh Lyne 0–1, Killian Falvey 0–1, Paul O’Shea 0–1, Seán Horan 0–1, Sean Keane 0–1	Report	Blake Murphy 1–3, Mark Cronin 0–4 (0–1f), Jack Murphy 0–1, Fionn Herlihy 0–1	Stadium: Austin Stack Park; Referee: Sean Lonergan (Tipperary); Man of the Match: Ruaidhrí Ó Beaglaioch (Kerry)

== Ulster Under-20 Football Championship ==
=== Preliminary round ===
8 February 2020 Preliminary round	Derry	1–13 – 1–8 (a.e.t.)	Fermanagh	Derry
14:00 IST (UTC+0)	Alex Doherty 1–5 (0–1f), Jude McAtamney 0–3 (0–2f), Eunan Mulholland 0–2, Cormac Murphy 0–1, Tiarnan McHugh 0–1, Kealan Friel 0–1	Report	Sean Cassidy 1–1, Callum Jones 0–3, Micheál Glynn 0–2 (0–1 '45), Brandon Horan 0–1, Gavin McGovern 0–1	Stadium: Celtic Park; Referee: Enda McFeely (Donegal)

=== Quarter-finals ===
21 February 2020 Quarter-final	Antrim	1–9 – 2–4	Derry	Belfast
19:45 IST (UTC+0)	Pat Shivers 0–5 (0–3f), Adam Loughran 1–0, Peter Henvey 0–2, Dominic McEnhill 0–1, Peter King 0–1	Report	Jude McAtamney 1–2, Conleth McShane 1–0, Alex Doherty 0–1 (0–1f), Ciaran Doyle 0–1	Stadium: The Dub; Referee: James Lewis (Fermanagh)

22 February 2020 Quarter-final	Cavan	0–8 – 1–11	Down	Cavan
13:00 IST (UTC+0)	Cormac O'Reilly 0–3, Paddy Lynch 0–2 (0–2f), Thomas Smith 0–2, Emmett Boylan 0–1 (0–1f)	Report	Cathal Gorman 0–5 (0–1f), Conal McNulty 1–0, Dean Rice 0–2, Cormac O'Rawe 0–1, Ruairi McCormack 0–1, Eoghan Byrne 0–1, Shealan Johnston 0–1	Stadium: Kingspan Breffni; Referee: Kieran Eannetta (Tyrone)

22 February 2020 Quarter-final	Donegal	2–9 – 1–12 (a.e.t.) (3–1 p)	Monaghan	Ballyshannon
13:00 IST (UTC+0)	Ethan Harkin 1–4 (0–3f, 0–1 '45), Aaron Doherty 1–2 (1–0 pen, 0–1 '45), Luke Gavigan 0–1, Rory O'Donnell 0–1, Ronan Frain 0–1	Report	Aaron Mulligan 0–5 (0–2f), Gary Mohan 1–2 (0–1f), Jason Irwin 0–2 (0–1f), Karl Gallagher 0–2, Liam Óg Murray 0–1	Stadium: Páirc Aodh Ruadh; Referee: Darren O'Hare (Down)

22 February 2020 Quarter-final	Armagh	0–8 – 1–9 (a.e.t.)	Tyrone	Armagh
13:00 IST (UTC+0)	Justin Kieran 0–3 (0–1m), Eoin Woods 0–2, Cian McConville 0–1 (0–1f), James McCormack 0–1 (0–1f), Donal Conlon 0–1	Report	Tiarnan Quinn 1–4 (0–2f), Conor Quinn 0–1, Antoin Fox 0–1, Neil Kilpatrick 0–1, Matthew Murnaghan 0–1, Darragh Canavan 0–1	Stadium: Box-It Athletic Grounds; Referee: Dan Mullan (Derry)

=== Semi-finals ===
29 February 2020 Semi-final	Antrim	0–9 – 0–11	Tyrone	Lavey
14:30 IST (UTC+0)	Pat Shivers 0–5 (0–4f), Dominic McEnhill 0–3 (0–2f), Rory Brolly 0–1	Report	Tiarnan Quinn 0–3 (0–1f), Lorcan Quinn 0–2 (0–1f, 0–1 '45), Darragh Canavan 0–2, Antoin Fox 0–1, Joe Oguz 0–1, Ethan Jordan 0–1, Ryan Jones 0–1	Stadium: Lavey GAA Grounds; Referee: Kevin Faloon (Armagh)

29 February 2020 Semi-final	Donegal	1–11 – 0–12	Down	The Loup
14:30 IST (UTC+0)	Aaron Doherty 1–3 (0–2f), Padraig McGettigan 0–2 (0–2m), Rory O'Donnell 0–2, Paul O'Hare 0–1, Peter McEniff 0–1, Richard O'Rourke 0–1, Conor McHugh 0–1	Report	Cathal Gorman 0–3 (0–2f), Ryan McEvoy 0–3 (0–1f), Cormac O'Rawe 0–2, Tim Prenter 0–1, Ruari O'Hare 0–1, Shealan Johnston 0–1, Ruairi McCormack 0–1	Stadium: Páirc Naomh Pádraig; Referee: Conor Dourneen (Cavan)

=== Final ===
7 March 2020 Final	Donegal	0–9 – 1–11	Tyrone	Clones
15:00 IST (UTC+0)	Aaron Doherty 0–3 (0–1f), Padraig McGettigan 0–2 (0–1f), Johnny McGroddy 0–1 (0–1m), Luke Gavigan 0–1, Paul O'Hare 0–1, Keelin McGroddy 0–1	Report	Ethan Jordan 0–5, Darragh Canavan 1–0, Tiarnan Quinn 0–2 (0–1f), Joe Oguz 0–2, Kevin Barker 0–1, Liam Gray 0–1	Stadium: St Tiernach's Park; Referee: Darren O'Hare (Down); Man of the Match: Ethan Jordan (Tyrone)

== All-Ireland Under-20 Football Championship ==
=== Semi-finals ===
17 October 2020 Semi-final	Dublin	1–14 – 1–12	Tyrone	Cavan
14:00 IST (UTC+1)	Ciarán Archer 0–6 (0–3f), Brian O'Leary 1–1, Mark Lavin 0–3, Lorcan O'Dell 0–2, Lee Gannon 0–1, Sean Lowry 0–1	Report	Tiarnan Quinn 1–3 (0–2f), Ethan Jordan 0–5 (0–3f, 0–1 '45), Darragh Canavan 0–3 (0–1m), Simon Garrity 0–1	Stadium: Breffni Park; Referee: Barry Judge (Sligo)

17 October 2020 Semi-final	Galway	1–15 – 1–10	Kerry	Limerick
16:00 IST (UTC+1)	Matthew Tierney 0–6 (0–5f, 0–1m), Matthew Cooley 0–4 (0–3f), Cian Monaghan 1–1, Patrick Kelly 0–1 (0–1f), Cian Hernon 0–1, Oisín Gormley 0–1, Nathan Grainger 0–1	Report	Deividas Uosis 0–3 (0–2f, 0–1 '45), Eddie Horan 0–3, Ruaidhrí Ó Beaglaoich 1–0, Paul Walsh 0–2, Sean Keane 0–1, Dylan Geaney 0–1	Stadium: Gaelic Grounds; Referee: Barry Tiernan (Dublin)

=== Final ===
19 December 2020 Final	Galway	1–11 – 0–13	Dublin	Dublin
14:30 IST (UTC+0)	Tomo Culhane 1–6 (0–4f, 0–1m), Matthew Tierney 0–4 (0–1f, 0–1m), Matthew Cooley 0–1	Report	Mark Lavin 0–4 (0–1f), Adam Fearon 0–2, Lorcan O'Dell 0–2, Brian O'Leary 0–2, Lee Gannon 0–1, Ciarán Archer 0–1, Luke Swan 0–1	Stadium: Croke Park; Referee: Paul Faloon (Down); Man of the Match: Jack Glynn (Galway)

== Statistics ==
=== Top scorers overall ===
Rank	Player	County	Tally	Total	Matches	Average
1	Ciarán Archer	Dublin	1–25	28	6	4.67
2	Matthew Tierney	Galway	1–18	21	5	4.20
3	Tiarnan Quinn	Tyrone	2–12	18	4	4.50
4	Mark McInerney	Clare	2–9	15	2	7.50
4	Blake Murphy	Cork	1–12	15	2	7.50
6	Tomo Culhane	Galway	2–8	14	4	3.50
6	Lorcan O'Dell	Dublin	2–8	14	6	2.33
6	Aaron Doherty	Donegal	2–8	14	3	4.67
9	Mark Lavin	Galway	0–11	11	6	1.83
9	Ethan Jordan	Tyrone	0–11	11	4	2.75

=== Top scorers in a single game ===
Rank	Player	County	Tally	Total	Opposition
1	Tomo Culhane	Galway	1–6	9	Dublin
1	Paul Towey	Mayo	0–9	9	Galway
1	Blake Murphy	Cork	0–9	9	Clare
4	Shane Meehan	Clare	2–2	8	Waterford
4	Mark McInerney	Clare	1–5	8	Waterford
4	Alex Doherty	Derry	1–5	8	Fermanagh
7	Ciarán Archer	Dublin	1–4	7	Longford
7	Tiarnan Quinn	Tyrone	1–4	7	Armagh
7	Mark McInerney	Clare	1–4	7	Cork
7	Ethan Harkin	Donegal	1–4	7	Monaghan
7	Ciarán Archer	Dublin	0–7	7	Laois
