= Jack Glynn =

Gaelic footballer

Personal information
- Native name: Seán Ó Glionn (Irish)
- Born: 22 November 2000 (age 25)
- Height: 5 ft 10 in (178 cm)

Sport
- Sport: Gaelic football
- Position: Left corner back
Club
- Years: Club
- Claregalway
College
- Years: College
- University of Limerick
College titles
- Sigerson titles: 0
Inter-county
- Years: County
- 2021–: Galway
Inter-county titles
- Connacht titles: 2
- All-Irelands: 0
- All Stars: 0

Jack Glynn (born 22 November 2000) is an Irish Gaelic footballer who plays for the Claregalway club and the Galway county team.

== Playing career ==
=== University ===
On 16 February 2022, Glynn was part of the University of Limerick panel that played NUI Galway in the final of the Sigerson Cup. Glynn was brought on as a half-time substitute as UL lost the match by 0–12 to 1–6.

UL reached the final again in 2023, facing UCC on 15 February. Glynn started the game, scoring a point as UL lost by three points after extra-time.

=== Inter-county ===
==== Minor and under-20 ====
On 9 July 2017, Glynn was on the Galway minor team that faced Sligo in the Connacht final. Galway were ten-point winners on the day. Galway exited the championship at the quarter-final stage to Cavan.

Glynn joined the under-20 squad in 2018. On 9 June, Glynn was in the half-back line as Galway were beaten in the Connacht semi-final by Roscommon.

Galway reached the Connacht final in 2019, facing Mayo. On 10 July 2019, Glynn came on as a substitute in the final, with Galway coming out winners by six points. Glynn also came on as a sub in the All-Ireland semi-final loss to Dublin.

Glynn captained the under-20 side in 2020. On 7 March, Glynn was in the full back line as Galway faced Roscommon in the Connacht final. Galway were comfortable winners as Glynn claimed his second provincial title at this grade. Galway beat Kerry in the All-Ireland semi-final to set up a final meeting with Dublin. The final took place on 19 December, and Glynn lifted the cup for Galway after a 1–11 to 0–13 victory. Glynn was named U20 Footballer of the Year for his performances in the championship.

==== Senior ====
Glynn joined the Galway senior panel in 2021. On 25 July, Glynn made his championship debut as a substitute against Mayo in the Connacht final. A strong second-half performance from Mayo gave them a six-point win.

On 24 April 2022, Glynn made his first championship start as Galway beat Mayo in the Connacht championship. On 29 May, Glynn started the Connacht final win over Roscommon. Wins over Armagh and Derry sent Galway to their first All-Ireland final since 2001. On 24 July, Glynn lined out at corner back in his first All-Ireland final, with Galway facing Kerry. Glynn scored a first-half point to put Galway a point ahead at half-time. Kerry finished the game strongly and were winners by four points. Glynn was named Young Footballer of the Year at the end of the season.

Galway reached the final of the National Football League in 2023, facing Mayo on 3 April. Glynn came on as a half-time substitute as Mayo won the match by 0–14 to 0–11. On 7 May, Glynn started the Connacht final against Sligo as Galway were fourteen-point winners.

== Honours ==
Galway

- Connacht Senior Football Championship: 2022, 2023
- All-Ireland Under-20 Football Championship: 2020 (c)
- Connacht Under-20 Football Championship: 2019, 2020 (c)
- Connacht Minor Football Championship: 2017

Individual

- GAA/GPA Young Footballer of the Year: 2022
- EirGrid Under-20 Footballer of the Year: 2020
- EirGrid 20 Under-20 Award: 2020

Achievements
Preceded by Peter O'Driscoll (Cork)	All-Ireland Under-20 Football Final winning captain 2020	Succeeded by Kieran Dolan (Offaly)
Awards
Preceded by Ciarán Archer (Dublin)	EirGrid Under-20 Footballer of the Year; 2020	Succeeded by Jack Bryant (Offaly)
Preceded by Oisín Mullin (Mayo)	GAA/GPA Young Footballer of the Year; 2022	Succeeded by Incumbent
