= Tony Leahy =

Irish Gaelic footballer and manager

Personal information
- Born: 1963 (age 62–63) Cork, Ireland

Sport
- Sport: Gaelic football
- Position: Forward
Club
- Years: Club
- 1980s-2000s: St Finbarr's
Club titles
- Cork titles: 2
- Munster titles: 2
- All-Ireland Titles: 1
Inter-county
Years	County	Apps (scores)
1983-1987	Cork	4 (0-02)
Inter-county titles
- Munster titles: 1
- All-Irelands: 0
- NFL: 0
- All Stars: 0

Anthony Leahy (born 1963) is a former Irish sportsperson. He played Gaelic football with his local club St Finbarr's and was a member at senior level of the Cork county team in the 1980s. He later managed Cork's under-21 team, leading them to the All-Ireland Championship in 2007.
