= 1966 Cork Intermediate Football Championship =

Gaelic football competition

- Teams: 13
- Champions: Na Piarsaigh (1st title)
- Runners-up: St. Vincent's

The 1966 Cork Intermediate Football Championship was the 31st staging of the Cork Intermediate Football Championship since its establishment by the Cork County Board in 1909. The draw for the opening round fixtures took place on 30 January 1966.

The final was played on 2 October 1966 at the Athletic Grounds in Cork, between Na Piarsaigh and St. Vincent's, in what was their first ever meeting in the final. Na Piarsaigh won the match by 1–08 to 2–04 to claim their first ever championship title.

== Results ==
=== Final ===
2 October 1966 Final	Na Piarsaigh	1-08 - 2-04	St. Vincent's	Clonmult Memorial Park
				Referee: P Halbert
