= 1980 All-Ireland Under-21 Football Championship =

Gaelic football competition

Championship details

All-Ireland Champions
- Winning team: Cork (3rd win)
- Captain: Timmy Dalton

All-Ireland Finalists
- Losing team: Dublin

Provincial Champions
- Munster: Cork
- Leinster: Dublin
- Ulster: Tyrone
- Connacht: Mayo

The 1980 All-Ireland Under-21 Football Championship was the 17th staging of the All-Ireland Under-21 Football Championship since its establishment by the Gaelic Athletic Association in 1964.

Down entered the championship as defending champions, however, they were defeated by Tyrone in the Ulster final.

On 12 October 1980, Cork won the championship following a 2-8 to 1-5 defeat of Dublin in the All-Ireland final. This was their third All-Ireland title overall and their first in nine championship seasons.

== Results ==
=== All-Ireland Under-21 Football Championship ===
Semi-finals

28 September 1980 Semi-final	Dublin	1-13 - 2-08	Mayo	Pearse Park, Longford

28 September 1980 Semi-final	Cork	3-10 - 1-05	Tyrone	Croke Park, Dublin
	E Fitzgerald 1-4, N O'Connor 1-1, F O'Mahony 1-0, S Hayes 0-3, T Dalton 0-1, D Barry 0-1.		P Ball 1-0, D O'Hagan 0-3, O Hetherington 0-2.	Referee: K Campbell (Meath)

Final

12 October 1980 Final	Cork	2-08 - 1-05	Dublin	MacDonagh Park, Nenagh
	F O'Mahony 2-2, D Barry 0-3, E Fitzgerald 0-1, S Hayes 0-1, N O'Connor 0-1.		C Duff 1-0, M Loftus 0-1, J Roynane 0-1, P Boylan 0-1, B Rock 0-1, V Kearney 0-1.	Referee: W Fogarty (Kerry)

== Statistics ==
=== Miscellaneous ===
- In the All-Ireland series there are a number of first-time championship meetings. The All-Ireland semi-final between Cork and Tyrone is a first championship meeting between the two teams, while the All-Ireland final between Cork and Dublin is also a first.
