= 2022 FBD Insurance Connacht GAA Senior Football Competition =

Gaelic football competition in Connacht, Ireland

Tournament details
- Province: Connacht
- Year: 2022
- Sponsor: FBD
- Date: 3–14 January 2022
- Teams: 5
- Defending champions: Galway

Winners
- Champions: Galway (10th win)
- Manager: Pádraic Joyce
- Captain: Seán Kelly

Runners-up
- Runners-up: Roscommon
- Manager: Anthony Cunningham

Other
- Matches played: 4

The 2022 FBD Insurance Connacht GAA Senior Football Competition was an inter-county Gaelic football competition in the province of Connacht. All five Connacht county teams participated, but no college or university teams. All games took place at the Connacht GAA Centre of Excellence under the new air-supported dome, the first inter-county games to take place under a roof.

Galway were the winners.

== Competition format ==
The competition is a straight knockout. Drawn games go to a golden score extra-time period.

== Fixtures ==
3 January 2022 Quarter-final	Sligo	1-21 (24) – (20) 1-17	Leitrim	Bekan
18:00 GMT (UTC±0)		(HT: 1-10 – 1-10)		Venue: Connacht GAA Centre of Excellence
		Report		Referee: Thomas Murphy (Galway)

7 January 2022 Semi-final	Mayo	0-13 (13) – (17) 0-17	Galway	Bekan
18:00 GMT (UTC±0)		(HT: 0-07 – 0-10)		Venue: Connacht GAA Centre of Excellence
		Report		Referee: John Gilmartin (Sligo)

8 January 2022 Semi-final	Roscommon	3-23 (32) – (21) 0-21	Sligo	Bekan
18:00 GMT (UTC±0)		(HT: 1-13 – 0-09)		Venue: Connacht GAA Centre of Excellence
		Report		Referee: Liam Devenney (Mayo)

14 January 2022 Final	Galway	1-18 (21) – (19) 1-16	Roscommon	Bekan
17:45 GMT (UTC±0)		(HT: 1-06 – 0-10)		Venue: Connacht GAA Centre of Excellence
		Report		Referee: John Gilmartin (Sligo)
