= Munster Under-20 Football Championship =

Gaelic football competition in Ireland

- Current season or competition: 2026 Munster Under-20 Football Championship
- Irish: Craobh Peile na Mumhan Fé-20
- Code: Gaelic football
- Founded: 1962; 64 years ago
- Region: Munster (GAA)
- Trophy: Corn na Cásca
- No. of teams: 6
- Title holders: titles); Ciarraí (32nd title)
- Most titles: Ciarraí (32 titles)
- Sponsors: EirGrid
- TV partner: TG4
- Official website: Munster GAA website

The Munster GAA Football Under-20 Championship, known simply as the Munster Under-20 Championship, is an annual inter-county Gaelic football competition organised by the Munster Council of the Gaelic Athletic Association (GAA). It is the highest inter-county football competition for male players between the ages of 17 and 20 in the province of Munster. The championship was contested as the Munster Under-21 Championship between 1962 and 2016 before changing to an under-20 age category from 2018. It is sponsored by EirGrid.

The final, currently held in March, serves as the culmination of a series of games played during a three-week period, and the results determine which team receives the Corn na Cásca. The championship has always been played on a straight knockout basis whereby once a team loses they are eliminated from the championship.

The Munster Championship is an integral part of the wider GAA Football Under-20 All-Ireland Championship. The winners of the Munster final, like their counterparts in the other three provinces, advance to the semi-final stage of the All-Ireland series of games.

Six teams currently participate in the Munster Championship. Kerry is the most successful team with 29 titles . The title has been won at least once by five teams, with just three of these winning the title more than once. Kerry are the current champions.

== History ==
=== Creation ===
The Munster Championship began in 1962 in response to a motion put forward for the introduction of a new championship grade to bridge the gap between underage and adult levels. It was the fourth championship to be created after the senior, junior and minor.

=== Beginnings ===
The inaugural Munster Championship featured Clare, Cork, Kerry, Limerick, Tipperary and Waterford. Cork and Waterford contested the very first match on Sunday 22 July 1962. Kerry won the inaugural championship.

=== Team dominance ===
Cork and Kerry have dominated the championship since the very beginning. Their hegemony saw one of them claim every available title for nearly the first 50 years of the competition. Kerry dominated the first two decades by winning 11 titles in the first 17 seasons. The set records by becoming the first team to win three-in-a-row and surpass it by winning four-in-a-row. Cork became the pre-eminent team of the eighties by winning seven titles in ten years, including a record-equalling four-in-a-row. Kerry returned as the foremost team of the nineties, claiming all but one of the available titles in a ten-year spell and ending the decade by setting the all-time record of five successive championship victories. The Millennium year saw Limerick break the duopoly by claiming their first and only title, with Waterford and Tipperary also adding their names to the roll of honour. The 21st Century has seen Cork return as the dominant force by winning 12 titles in the first two decades.

== Current format ==
=== Overview ===
The Munster Championship is a single elimination tournament. Each team is afforded only one defeat before being eliminated from the championship. Pairings for matches are drawn at random and there is currently no seeding. Each match is played as a single leg. If a match is drawn there is a period of extra time, however, if both sides are still level at the end of extra time a replay takes place and so on until a winner is found.

=== Progression ===
	Teams entering in this round	Teams advancing from previous round
Quarter-finals (4 teams)	4 teams drawn at random	
Semi-finals (4 teams)	2 teams who receive a bye at random	2 winners from the quarter-finals
Final (2 teams)		2 winners from the semi-finals

=== Qualification for subsequent competitions ===
The Munster Championship winners gain automatic entry to the semi-final stage of the All-Ireland Championship. Unlike, the hurling counterpart, there is no "back-door" for the runners-up.

== Managers ==
Managers in the Munster Championship are involved in the day-to-day running of the team, including the training, team selection, and sourcing of players from the club championships. Their influence varies from county-to-county and is related to the individual county boards. The manager is assisted by a team of two or three selectors and an extensive backroom team consisting of various coaches. The under-20 team manager also works closely with the senior team manager due to an overlap of players on both teams. Prior to the development of the concept of a manager in the 1970s, teams were usually managed by a team of selectors with one member acting as chairman.

Winning managers (1989–present)
Manager	Team	Wins	Winning years
Jack O'Connor	Kerry	7	1996, 1997, 1998, 1999, 2002, 2017, 2018
Tony Leahy	Cork	4	2004, 2005, 2006, 2007
John Cleary	Cork	4	2009, 2011, 2012, 2013
Mickey Ned O'Sullivan	Kerry	3	1990, 1991, 1992
Páidí Ó Sé	Kerry	2	1993, 1995
Seán Hayes	Cork	2	2014, 2016
Keith Ricken	Cork	2	2019, 2021
Bob Honohan	Cork	1	1989
John Fintan Daly	Cork	1	1994
Liam Kearns	Limerick	1	2000
Tony Davis	Cork	1	2001
Pat Nugent	Waterford	1	2003
Seán Geaney	Kerry	1	2008
John Evans	Tipperary	1	2010
Tommy Toomey	Tipperary	1	2015

== Roll of honour ==
#	County	Titles	Runners-up	Years won	Years runners-up
1	Kerry	32	12	1962, 1964, 1966, 1967, 1968, 1972, 1973, 1975, 1976, 1977, 1978, 1983, 1987, 1988, 1990, 1991, 1992, 1993, 1995, 1996, 1997, 1998, 1999, 2002, 2008, 2017, 2018, 2020, 2022, 2023, 2024, 2025	1963, 1969, 1974, 1981, 1982, 2003, 2004, 2010, 2011, 2012, 2016, 2019
2	Cork	28	21	1963, 1965, 1969, 1970, 1971, 1974, 1979, 1980, 1981, 1982, 1984, 1985, 1986, 1989, 1994, 2001, 2004, 2005, 2006, 2007, 2009, 2011, 2012, 2013, 2014, 2016, 2019, 2021	1962, 1966, 1972, 1973, 1976, 1977, 1978, 1983, 1990, 1991, 1992, 1997, 1999, 2015, 2017, 2018, 2020, 2022, 2023, 2024, 2025
3	Tipperary	2	11	2010, 2015	1964, 1965, 1986, 1987, 1998, 2007, 2008, 2009, 2013, 2014, 2021
4	Waterford	1	7	2003	1971, 1975, 1993, 1994, 1995, 2000, 2006
4	Limerick	1	3	2000	1984, 2001, 2005
6	Clare	0	10	-	1967, 1968, 1970, 1979, 1980, 1985, 1988, 1989, 1996, 2002

== List of finals ==
Year	Winner	Score	Opponent	Score
2025	Kerry	2-15	Cork	1-10
2024	Kerry	1-15	Cork	0-12
2023	Kerry	2-12	Cork	1-06
2022	Kerry	1-11	Cork	0-07
2021	Cork	3–20	Tipperary	3–10
2020	Kerry	0–17	Cork	1-09
2019	Cork	3–16	Kerry	0–12
2018	Kerry	3–18	Cork	2-04
2017	Kerry	2–16	Cork	0-06
2016	Cork	3-09	Kerry	1–14
2015	Tipperary	1–15	Cork	3-08
2014	Cork	1–18	Tipperary	3-08
2013	Cork	1–17	Tipperary	0-09
2012	Cork	2–12	Kerry	1–14
2011	Cork	2–24	Kerry	0-08
2010	Tipperary	1-07	Kerry	1-06
2009	Cork	1-09	Tipperary	2-05
2008	Kerry	0–15	Tipperary	2-07
2007	Cork	3–19	Tipperary	3–12
2006	Cork	4–14	Waterford	1-06
2005	Cork	1–14	Limerick	1–11
2004	Cork	0–13	Kerry	0–12
2003	Waterford	2-08	Kerry	1-09
2002	Kerry	3–15	Clare	2–11
2001	Cork	1–12	Limerick	0-08
2000	Limerick	0-07	Waterford	0-04
1999	Kerry	1–10	Cork	0-07
1998	Kerry	3–10	Tipperary	1–11
1997	Kerry	2–11, 0–12 (R)	Cork	3-08, 1–07 (R)
1996	Kerry	3–14	Clare	0-06
1995	Kerry	1–21	Waterford	2-05
1994	Cork	2–11	Waterford	0-04
1993	Kerry	1–21	Waterford	3-05
1992	Kerry	3–12	Cork	1-08
1991	Kerry	1-08	Cork	0–10
1990	Kerry	2-09	Cork	0-09
1989	Cork	3–15	Clare	1-07
1988	Kerry	0–14	Clare	2-06
1987	Kerry	0-07, 0–15 (R)	Tipperary	0-07, 1–11 (R)
1986	Cork	0-08	Tipperary	0-07
1985	Cork	1–18	Clare	1-07
1984	Cork	1–18	Limerick	0-04
1983	Kerry	1–10	Cork	0–12
1982	Cork	2–12	Kerry	0-04
1981	Cork	0–11	Kerry	0-06
1980	Cork	3–15	Clare	0-04
1979	Cork	1–11	Clare	1-09
1978	Kerry	0–14	Cork	0-09
1977	Kerry	2-08	Cork	0-08
1976	Kerry	2–16	Cork	1-06
1975	Kerry	0–17	Waterford	1-05
1974	Cork	3-05	Kerry	1–10
1973	Kerry	2–12	Cork	1–12
1972	Kerry	1–11	Cork	2-07
1971	Cork	1–10	Waterford	2-05
1970	Cork	5–12	Clare	1-07
1969	Cork	1–14	Kerry	1–11
1968	Kerry	5-07	Clare	2-09
1967	Kerry	2–12	Clare	1-07
1966	Kerry	3-08	Cork	0–14
1965	Cork	2–14	Tipperary	1-06
1964	Kerry	0–15	Tipperary	1-02
1963	Cork	2-03	Kerry	1-04
1962	Kerry	2-07	Cork	1-04

=== Recent finals ===
Year	Winners	Score	Runners-up	Score	Captain(s)	Venue
2018	Kerry	3–11	Cork	0–14	Donal O'Sullivan	Austin Stack Park
2019	Cork	3–16	Kerry	0–12	Peter O'Driscoll	Páirc Uí Rinn
2020	Kerry	0–17	Cork	1-09	Paul O'Shea	Austin Stack Park

== Records and statistics ==
=== Teams by decade ===
The most successful team of each decade, judged by number of Munster Championship titles, is as follows:

- 1960s: 5 for Kerry (1962-64-66-67-68)
- 1970s: 6 for Kerry (1972-73-75-76-77-78)
- 1980s: 7 for Cork (1980-81-82-84-85-86-89)
- 1990s: 9 for Kerry (1990-91-92-93-95-96-97-98-99)
- 2000s: 6 for Cork (2001-04-05-06-07-09)
- 2010s: 6 for Cork (2011-12-13-14-16-19)
- 2020s: 2 for Kerry (2020-22)
