= Na Piarsaigh GAA (Cork) =

Gaelic games club in County Cork, Ireland

Na Piarsaigh
- Na Piarsaigh
- Founded: 1943
- County: Cork
- Nickname: The Wazzies
- Colours
- Grounds: Páirc Uí Chonaire
- Coordinates: 51°55′08.41″N 8°29′45.39″W

Playing kits
Standard colours

Senior Club Championships
	All Ireland	Munster champions	Cork champions
Hurling:	0	0	3

Na Piarsaigh Hurling and Football Club is a Gaelic Athletic Association club in Fair Hill, Cork, Ireland. The club is affiliated to the Seandún Board and fields teams in both hurling and Gaelic football.

== History ==
Located in the Fair Hill area on the northside of Cork, Na Piarsaigh Hurling and Football Club was founded by a group of North Monastery students in 1943. The club is named in honour of Pádraig Pearse, to reflect the nationalist ideals of the club and its members. Early training sessions took place at Collins Barracks, prior to the club acquiring their own playing field in 1951.

Na Piarsaigh had their first success when, in 1946, they claimed their City JHC title. Their second title, won in 1953, was subsequently converted into a Cork JHC, following a 6-00 to 2–10 win over Cloughduv in the final. Na Piarsaigh made a Gaelic football breakthrough in 1964, with the first of back-to-back City JAFC titles. The Cork JFC was won in 1965, while the club secured a second successive promotion by claiming the Cork IFC in 1966, thus becoming a dual senior club.

The club was also successful on the underage front, winning numerous Cork MHC and MFC titles, as well as several Cork U21HC titles between the 1960s and 1980s. These successes paved the way for the club's first ever Cork SHC title, won in 1990 after a 2–07 to 1–08 defeat of St Finbarr's in the final. Na Piarsaigh won their second Cork SHC title after beating Ballyhea in the 1995 final. The club maintained their perfect record in SHC finals in 2004, by beating Cloyne by 0–17 to 0–10 to collect their third title.

The club's crest features the red hand of Ulster, with the thumb omitted. According to the club, the omission of the thumb "symbolises the six northern counties 'under foreign rule'" and that, in the event of a United Ireland, "the thumb will rejoin the fingers to create a strong, powerful, useful hand".

== Honours ==
- Cork Senior Hurling Championship (3): (1990, 1995, 2004)
- Kelleher Shield (2): 1967, 2003
- Cork Senior Hurling League (5): 1978, 1988, 1992, 1997, 2013)
- Cork Intermediate Football Championship (1): 1966
- Cork Junior Football Championship (1): 1965
- Cork Junior Hurling Championship (1): 1953
- Cork City Junior Hurling Championship (6): 1946, 1953, 1979, 1989, 1995, 1997
- Cork City Junior Football Championship (4): 1964, 1965, 1974, 2005
- Cork Under-21 Hurling Championship (3): 1980, 1981, 1987
- Cork Minor Hurling Championships (11): 1960, 1961, 1962, 1965, 1977, 1978, 1981, 1982, 1995, 1996, 2016
- Cork Minor Football Championship (3): 1981, 1994, 1995
- Féile na nGael (7): 1973, 1974, 1977, 1980, 1991, 2006, 2017

== Notable players ==
- John Gardiner: All-Ireland SHC-winner (2004, 2005)
- Rónán McGregor: All-Ireland SHC-winner (2005)
- Mickey Mullins: All-Ireland SHC-winner (1990)
- Seán Óg Ó hAilpín: All-Ireland SHC-winner (1999, 2004, 2005)
- Tony O'Sullivan: All-Ireland SHC-winner (1984, 1986, 1990)
- Donal Sheehan: All-Ireland SHC-winner (1966)
