= Larry Tompkins =

Irish Gaelic footballer and manager

Larry Tomkins
Personal information
- Native name: Labhrás Tóimicín (Irish)
- Born: 13 June 1963 (age 63) Naas, County Kildare, Ireland
- Occupation: Publican
- Height: 6 ft 0 in (183 cm)

Sport
- Sport: Gaelic football
- Position: Centre-forward
Clubs
- Years: Club
- Eadestown; Castlehaven
Club titles
- Cork titles: 2
- Munster titles: 3
- All-Ireland Titles: 0
Inter-county
Years	County	Apps (scores)
1979–1985 1987–1996	Kildare; Cork	8 (2-33); 27(0–117)
Inter-county titles
- Munster titles: 6
- All-Irelands: 2
- NFL: 1
- All Stars: 3

Larry Tompkins (born 13 June 1963) is a former Irish Gaelic football manager and player. Throughout his 20-year club career, he played for his adopted club Castlehaven, winning three Munster Club Championship titles during a golden age for the club; he had earlier played for his hometown club Eadestown, and also enjoyed championship successes. At inter-county level, he captained Cork to win the 1990 All-Ireland Championship; he had earlier claimed a first winners' medal as centre-forward on the 1989 All-Ireland-winning team. As well as being a successful captain for club and county, Tompkins was also selected for Leinster and Munster in the Railway Cup. After retirement from playing, he served as a coach and manager, most notably with the Cork senior team.

Tompkins is widely considered one of the best players of his generation, and among the greatest of all time, as well as being regarded by many in the sport as Cork's greatest ever centre-forward. Once described by former Kerry manager Mick O'Dwyer as 'one of the best players to ever play football', he was a three-time All-Star-winner. Tompkins was also selected on the Kildare and Cork Teams of the Millennium.

== Early life ==
Larry Tompkins was born in Greenmount, Rathmore just outside Naas, County Kildare in 1963. The youngest of seven children, he showed a keen interest in Gaelic football from an early age. Tompkins was educated at Rathmore national school where he first played both hurling and football. He later attended Blessington secondary school in County Wicklow where he developed his football skills even further. Tompkins was captain of the Wicklow Vocational Schools team that won the Leinster championship in 1980. The team subsequently lost the All-Ireland final to Derry.

Tomkins later trained as a carpenter; however, at a time when unemployment was rife in Ireland, he spent much of the early 1980s working in the United States. Tompkins returned to Ireland in 1987 and settled in Castlehaven, County Cork.

== Club career ==
Tomkins began his club football career with his local club in Eadestown and enjoyed much success. He won a junior 'B’ title with the club in 1981, a victory which acted as a springboard for further success. The following year Tompkins added a junior 'A’ title to his collection. Further success followed in 1983 when Eadestown, with Tompkins playing a key role, secured a county intermediate championship title.

When Tompkins emigrated to the United States in the 1980s he played his club football with the Donegal club in New York. He enjoyed much success here and he captained the club to win the New York championship on two occasions. Famously, the club never lost a championship game when Tompkins was included on the team.

It was in New York that Tompkins befriended the Collins's from Castlehaven, County Cork. They persuaded him to join their local club when he returned to Ireland. In 1987 Tomkins did just that and threw his lot in with 'the 'Haven'. Two years later his decision bore fruit. Tompkins was captain as Castlehaven defeated the famous St. Finbarr's club to take the county senior championship title in Cork. Castlehaven later defeated St. Senan's of Clare to take the Munster club title. Castlehaven's great run of success came to an abrupt end in the All-Ireland semi-final when the club was defeated by eventual champions Baltinglass.

Five years later in 1994 Tompkins secured a second county championship winners' medal following a victory over nearby rivals O'Donovan Rossa. A second Munster club winners' medal later followed for Tompkins as Castlehaven defeated Clomnel Commercials of Tipperary. Once again, 'the 'Haven' were later defeated by Kilmacud Crokes in the All-Ireland semi-final.

1997 saw Castlehaven lose the county final to Beara, however, the club later represented Cork in the provincial series of games. A third Munster club title soon followed after a defeat of Fethard in the provincial decider. Castlehaven faced heartbreak again following a third defeat in the All-Ireland semi-final.

== County career ==
=== Minor and under-21 ===
Tomkins first came to prominence on the inter-county scene as a sixteen-year-old in 1979. That year he was a member of the Kildare minor, under-21 and senior football teams.

Tompkins spent three seasons with Kildare at minor level. He lined out against Meath in the Leinster final in 1980, however, on that occasion 'the Lilywhites' were defeated on that occasion by 1–12 to 1–9. That same year Tompkins lined out in the Leinster under-21 final with Dublin providing the opposition. An exciting game developed with both sides finishing level. A replay proved more conclusive with 'the Dubs' taking the title by 2–9 to 0–6.

Three years later in 1983 Tompkins played in a second Leinster under-21 final. Louth provided the opposition on that occasion; however, victory went to Kildare by 1–13 to 1–8. It was Tompkins's first Leinster under-21 winners' medal. Kildare, however, were subsequently defeated in the All-Ireland semi-final.

=== Senior ===
By this stage Tompkins was a well-established player on the Kildare senior football team. It was an unhappy time for 'the Lilywhites' as they failed to even reach the Leinster final. An O'Byrne Cup title in 1982 was the best that the county could muster. By the mid-1980s Tompkins was recognised as Kildare's top player, however, it wasn't long before he had a disagreement with the Kildare county board. He had been living in New York but returned regularly to line out with Kildare. The county board had been paying for his flight tickets, however, they decided to stop this and Tomkins found the expense too great. As a result of this he never played with his native-county again and faced the prospect of prematurely ending a promising inter-county career.

In 1987 Tompkins's performances for Castlehaven brought him to the attention of the Cork senior football selectors under legendary goalkeeper Billy Morgan. He earned a call up to the team and made his senior debut in the provincial championship that same year. The task ahead was enormous as Cork's nearest neighbours, Kerry, had won eleven of the last twelve Munster titles and had put Cork to the sword on most of those occasions. The 'traditional' Munster final in 1987 between Cork and Kerry ended in a draw, however, Cork triumphed over the four-in-a-row hopefuls by 0–13 to 1–5. It was Tompkins's first Munster winners' medal. Cork subsequently qualified for the All-Ireland final with Meath providing the opposition. Mid-way through the first-half Cork had a goal chance blocked by Mick Lyons when Jimmy Kerrigan looked to be through for a seven-point lead. Instead, it was Meath who led by 1–6 to 0–8 at half-time, courtesy of a Colm O'Rourke goal. Tompkins's radar was also off course as he missed six out of eight free-kicks. At the full-time whistle Meath were the winners by 1–14 to 0–11. In spite of the defeat Tompkins rounded off the year by winning an All-Star award.

In 1988 Tompkins captured a second consecutive Munster title before a second All-Ireland final appearance beckoned. Meath provided the opposition once again as Cork got off to a good start with a Teddy McCarthy goal. By the end of the game Cork led by a point, however, Brian Stafford scored the equaliser. The replay was a controversial affair. Meath's Gerry McEntee was sent-off after just seven minutes. In spite of being reduced to fourteen men, Meath hung on for a narrow 0–13 to 0–12 victory. It was Tompkins's second consecutive defeat, however, he was later presented with a second All-Star.

A National League title was captured at the start of 1989 and a third consecutive Munster title was annexed by Tompkins later that summer. Once again, Cork qualified for a third consecutive All-Ireland final. Mayo were the opponents on this occasion and the game was a close affair for much of the opening half. An Anthony Finnerty goal after thirty-eight minutes gave Mayo a brief lead, however, the Connacht champs failed to score for the last nineteen minutes. Teddy McCarthy took control and Cork secured victory by 0–17 to 1–11. It was Tompkins's first All-Ireland winners' medal and a first title for Cork since 1973. A third consecutive All-Star award quickly followed.

In 1990 Tomkins was appointed Cork captain as the team sought to retain their All-Ireland title. That year Cork made it a remarkable four Munster titles on the trot. A fourth consecutive All-Ireland final appearance quickly followed, with old rivals Meath providing the opposition. Cork suffered a blow in the first-half when Colm O'Neill was sent off; however, Tomkins's fellow Kildare county man, Shay Fahy, was playing a blinder at midfield. In spite of only having fourteen men Cork won the game by 0–11 to 0–9. It was a second consecutive All-Ireland title Tompkins, while he also had the honour of collecting the Sam Maguire Cup. This victory was all the more special as the Cork hurling team had already won their respective All-Ireland title a fortnight earlier. It was the first time in the modern era that a county had won the hurling and football 'double'.

Cork lost their provincial titles for the next few seasons and a series of injuries nearly brought Tompkins's career to an end. He missed Cork's Munster final triumph and their All-Ireland final defeat in 1993, but returned to the team in 1994. That year he secured a fifth Munster winners' medal following a convincing victory over Tipperary. Cork, however, were later defeated by eventual champions Down in the All-Ireland semi-final.

In 1995 Tompkins won a sixth Munster title, a record-breaking seventh in nine seasons for Cork, as Kerry fell in the provincial decider. Once again Cork were subsequently defeated by eventual All-Ireland champions Dublin in the All-Ireland semi-final.

In 1996 the old order in Munster was restored. Kerry defeated Cork by 0–14 to 0–11 in the Munster final, taking their first provincial title since 1991 in the process. This defeat saw Cork exit the championship and effectively brought Tompkins's inter-county career to an end.

== Managerial career ==
Tompkins became involved in coaching while he was still in his heyday as a player. He managed the Waterford under-21 football team in the early 1990s. Although he didn't enjoy any success with the team, it was Tompkins's coaching that helped the county to contest three consecutive Munster under-21 finals between 1993 and 1995.

In late 1996 Tompkins succeeded Billy Morgan as manager of the Cork senior football team. It was a tough act to follow as Morgan had been Cork's most successful manager of all time. The first two seasons proved difficult as Cork crashed out of the championship at very early stages. The county board had faith in Tompkins who was attempting to put together a new team following the retirements of some of the great players from the late 1980s and early 1990s.

In 1999 Cork were back in the big time. Tompkins began the year by guiding Cork to a National League title following a 0–12 to 1–7 victory over Dublin. Shortly after this victory he steered his adopted county to a Munster football decider against arch-rivals Kerry. In atrocious weather conditions Cork emerged victorious by 2–10 to 2–4. It was Tompkin's first Munster title as manager and acted as a springboard for further success. In September his charges lined out in the All-Ireland final against Meath. In an exciting game that saw the lead switch hands on several occasions Cork's hopes of doing the double were dashed as Meath won by 1–11 to 1–8. Cork lost their provincial crown for the next few seasons; however, in 2002 Tompkins's side tasted success once again. Tipperary surprisingly provided the opposition in the provincial final, however, the game ended in a draw. After a thrilling draw Cork trounced Tipp by 1–23 to 0–7 in the subsequent replay. It was the Kildare man's second Munster title as manager. The subsequent All-Ireland semi-final pitted Cork against Kerry. It was an historic occasion as it was the first time that these great rivals had met in Croke Park. Unfortunately, Cork were trounced on a score line of 3–19 to 2–7. The year ended with the Cork hurling team going on strike. In turn, the football team joined in a sympathy strike. The players, who had been seeking better conditions, refused to play or train with the county again until the dispute with the county board was resolved.

Following the strike the fortunes of the Cork football team took a turn for the worse. Embarrassing defeats in 2003 brought Tompkins's reign as manager to an end.

== Personal life ==
Tompkins owed and ran his own pub in the centre of Cork city for 30 years before selling up in 2021.

== Honours ==
In May 2020, the Irish Independent named Tompkins at number eight in its "Top 20 footballers in Ireland over the past 50 years".

== Career statistics ==
=== Club ===
Team	Season	Cork		Munster		All-Ireland		Total	
Team	Season	Apps	Score	Apps	Score	Apps	Score	Apps	Score
Castlehaven	1987-88	1	0-01	—		—		1	0-01
Castlehaven	1988-89	1	0-06	—		—		1	0-06
Castlehaven	1989-90	4	0-18	2	0-10	1	0-04	7	0-32
Castlehaven	1990-91	0	0-00	—		—		0	0-00
Castlehaven	1991-92	2	0-00	—		—		2	0-00
Castlehaven	1992-93	4	1-16	—		—		4	1-16
Castlehaven	1993-94	1	0-03	—		—		1	0-03
Castlehaven	1994-95	6	0-23	3	2-10	2	0-14	11	2-47
Castlehaven	1995-96	0	0-00	—		—		0	0-00
Castlehaven	1996-97	1	0-00	—		—		1	0-00
Castlehaven	1997-98	6	1-12	3	0-12	2	0-06	11	1-30
Castlehaven	1998-99	2	1-05	—		—		2	1-05
Castlehaven	1999-00	2	0-01	—		—		2	0-01
Career total		30	3-85	8	2-32	5	0-24	43	5-141

== Honours ==
Eadestown

- Kildare Intermediate Football Championship: 1983
- Kildare Junior A Football Championship: 1982

Castlehaven

- Munster Senior Club Football Championship: 1989, 1994, 1997
- Cork Senior Football Championship: 1989, 1994

Cork

- All-Ireland Senior Football Championship: 1989, 1990 (c)
- Munster Senior Football Championship: 1987, 1988, 1989, 1990, 1994, 1995
- National Football League: 1988-89

Kildare

- Leinster Under-21 Football Championship: 1983

Wicklow Vocational Schools

- Leinster Vocational Schools Championship: 1980 (c)

Preceded by Dinny Allen	Cork Senior Football Captain; 1990	Succeeded by Danny Culloty
Preceded by Billy Morgan	Cork Senior Football Manager; 1997–2003	Succeeded by Billy Morgan
Achievements
Preceded by Dinny Allen	All-Ireland Senior Football Final winning captain 1990	Succeeded by Paddy O'Rourke
