= 1993 Cork Senior Football Championship =

Gaelic football competition

- Dates: 25 April 1993 – 31 October 1993
- Teams: 22
- Champions: Nemo Rangers (10th title); Steven O'Brien (captain); Dinny Allen (manager)
- Runners-up: St. Finbarr's; Tony Leahy (manager)

Tournament statistics
- Matches played: 23
- Goals scored: 44 (1.91 per match)
- Points scored: 477 (20.74 per match)
- Top scorer(s): Colin Corkery (4-36)

The 1993 Cork Senior Football Championship was the 105th staging of the Cork Senior Football Championship since its establishment by the Cork County Board in 1887. The draw for the opening fixtures took place on 13 December 1992. The championship began on 25 April 1993 and ended on 31 October 1993.

O'Donovan Rossa were the defending champions, however, they were defeated by Nemo Rangers at the quarter-final stage.

On 31 October 1993, Nemo Rangers won the championship following a 0–13 to 0–04 defeat of St. Finbarr's in the final. This was their 10th championship title overall and their first title since 1988.

Colin Corkery from the Nemo Rangers club was the championship's top scorer with 4-36.

== Team changes ==
=== To Championship ===
Promoted from the Cork Intermediate Football Championship

- Mallow

== Results ==
=== First round ===
2 May 1993 First round	Imokilly	0-09 - 1-04	Clonakilty	Páirc Uí Chaoimh, Cork
	C O'Neill 0-5, J Morgan 0-2, G Manley 0-1, WJ Manley 0-1.		K Meade 1-1, T Dillon 0-2, P Griffin 0-1.	Referee: E Murphy (Douglas)

2 May 1993 First round	University College Cork	0-07 - 4-20	Nemo Rangers	Páirc Uí Chaoimh, Cork
	K O'Dwyer 0-3, F Keohane 0-2, D Aherne 0-1, M McKenna 0-1.		C Corkery 1-9, J Kavanagh 2-2, N Corkery 1-3, S Fahy 0-3, S Calnan 0-2, T Dalton 0-1.	Referee: J Motherway (Aghada)

2 May 1993 First round	Beara	2-07 - 0-16	O'Donovan Rossa	Wolfe Tone Park, Bantry
	G O'Sullivan 1-1, H O'Sullivan 1-0, S Harrington 0-2, C O'Sullivan 0-2, B O'Dwyer 0-1, M Harrington 0-1.		M McCarthy 0-7, B Carmody 0-3, A Davis 0-2, J O'Driscoll 0-1, B O'Donovan 0-1, D Davis 0-1, P Davis 0-1.	Referee: S O'Keeffe

2 May 1993 First round	Aghada	1-09 - 0-12	Glanmire	Clonmult Memorial Park, Midleton
	M Lewis 0-5, O O'Neill 1-0, D Devoy 0-1, M Hennessy 0-1, D Creedon 0-1, R Lewis 0-1.		T McCarthy 0-8, M Flynn 0-2, D O'Donoghue 0-1, M Mulvihill 0-1.	Referee: N Barrett (Carrigtwohill)

2 May 1993 First round	Castlehaven	2-11 - 2-02	Seandún	Charlie Hurley Park, Bandon
	J Cleary 0-6, B Collins 1-0, J Maguire 1-0, E Cleary 0-2, N Cahalane 0-1, F Collins 0-1, P Cahalane 0-1.		B Egan 1-1, Billy Twomey 1-0, K Hyland 0-1.	Referee: G Harrington (Carrigaline)

2 May 1993 First round	Macroom	0-09 - 2-10	Muskerry	Carrigadrohid
	N Twomey 0-7, G McPolin 0-1, S Coughlan 0-1.		SF Cronin 1-5, C O'Connell 1-0, J O'Driscoll 0-2, D Cronin 0-1, J Ring 0-1, G Lally 0-1.	Referee: R Murphy (Lyre)

26 June 1993 First round replay	Aghada	0-18 - 2-14 (aet)	Glanmire	Clonmult Memorial Park, Midleton
	M Lewis 0-7, R Lewis 0-3, R Dwane 0-2, D Creedon 0-2, P Cashman 0-2, B Tynan 0-1, C Counihan 0-1.		P O'Callaghan 1-3, T McCarthy 0-5, C O'Leary 1-1, D O'Donoghue 0-1, M Flynn 0-1, M Murphy 0-1, N Mulvihill 0-1, G Murphy 0-1.	Referee: N Barrett (Carrigtwohill)

=== Second round ===
25 April 1993 Second round	St. Finbarr's	1-07 - 1-06	Duhallow	Macroom
	M Buckley 1-0, J Keating 0-3, M Comyns 0-2, B O'Shea 0-1, J Costello 0-1.		A Barry 1-0, J Dennehy 0-2, A Cronin 0-2, D O'Connor 0-1, M O'Sullivan 0-1.	Referee: M Collins (Clonakilty)

30 April 1993 Second round	St. Nicholas'	0-13 - 0-09	Na Piarsaigh	Páirc Uí Chaoimh, Cork
	D Fagan 0-6, C Buckley 0-2, T Browne 0-2, J Fox 0-1, J Lynch 0-1, K Hendrix 0-1.		D Sheehan 0-5, P O'Connor 0-3, J O'Connor 0-1.	Referee: N Barrett

1 May 1993 Second round	Avondhu	0-11 - 2-10	Carrigdhoun	Watergrasshill
	W O'Riordan 0-5, P Harrington 0-3, T McGlinchey 0-2, N Landy 0-1.		C O'Donovan 1-2, G O'Sullivan 1-0, J O'Mahony 0-2, J Bernard 0-2, A Crowley 0-2, M Brady 0-1, D Fitzgerald 0-1.	Referee: E Porter (Brian Dillons)

1 May 1993 Second round	St Michael's	0-07 - 3-10	Carbery	Innishannon
	J Quilter 0-2, C Kennedy 0-2, A Ryan 0-2, A Aherne 0-1.		P Hodnett 1-1, B Harte 0-4, J Whooley 1-0, M O'Connor 1-0, P Nolan 0-1, F Collins 0-1, S Daly 0-1, J Cotter 0-1, P Hegarty 0-1.	Referee: J Murphy (Castletownbere)

4 May 1993 Second round	Mallow	1-07 - 0-12	Bishopstown	Blarney
	R Sheehan 1-2, J Walsh 0-3, M O'Donovan 0-1, D O'Shea 0-1.		S casey 0-4, B Coffey 0-2, P McGrath 0-2, M Hayes 0-2, D Murphy 0-1, L Honohan 0-1.	Referee: J O'Leary

2 July 1993 Second round	Imokilly	2-03 - 2-18	Nemo Rangers	Páirc Séamus de Barra, Carrigtwohill
	J Corcoran 2-0, N Gubbins 0-1, J Morgan 0-1, C O'Neill 0-1.		C Corkery 0-7, J Kavanagh 1-3, S O'Brien 1-0, S Calnan 0-3, P Lambert 0-2, E Fitzgerald 0-1, N Corkery 0-1, P Dorgan 0-1.	Referee: G Harrington

3 July 1993 Second round	Castlehaven	0-10 - 1-11	Muskerry	Clonakilty
	L Tompkins 0-3, P Cahalane 0-3, E Cleary 0-2, M O'Mahony 0-1, F Collins 0-1.		J O'Driscoll 1-1, P O'Mahony 0-3, S Cronin 0-2, J Ring 0-2, P Coleman 0-1, C O'Connell 0-1, F Daly 0-1.

25 July 1993 Second round	O'Donovan Rossa	1-09 - 0-11	Glanmire	Innishannon
	M McCarthy 0-9, B O'Donovan 1-0.		T McCarthy 0-7, G Murphy 0-2, M Flynn 0-1, N Mulvihill 0-1.	Referee: S O'Keeffe (St. Michael's)

=== Quarter-finals ===
31 July 1993 Quarter-final	Carbery	1-16 - 1-08	St. Nicholas'	Riverstick
	P Hegarty 0-5, P Nolan 1-1, K Harrington 0-4, S Daly 0-1, B Herlihy 0-1, B Harte 0-1, D O'Neill 0-1, M O'Connor 0-1, M Farr 0-1.		N Burns 1-1, D Fagan 0-4, K Hendrix 0-1, M Brosnan 0-1, V Hedderman 0-1.	Referee: G Harrington (Carrigaline)

1 August 1993 Quarter-final	Nemo Rangers	3-18 - 1-09	O'Donovan Rossa	Charlie Hurley Park, Bandon
	N Corkery 1-5, C Corkery 1-4, P Dorgan 1-0, J Kavanagh 0-2, P Lambert 0-2, S Fahy 0-1, S O'Brien 0-1, S Calanan 0-1, S O'Brien 0-1, E Fitzgerald 0-1.		M McCarthy 1-2, J O'Driscoll 0-2, A Davis 0-1, P Davis 0-1, N Murphy 0-1, F McCarthy 0-1, A Byrne 0-1.	Referee: R Murphy

8 August 1993 Quarter-final	St. Finbarr's	0-12 - 0-04	Carrigdhoun	Shanbally
	J Keating 0-5, J Costello 0-2, M Comyns 0-2, I O'Mahony 0-1, M Buckley 0-1, B O'Shea 0-1.		P Long 0-2, P Helay 0-1, A Crowley 0-1.	Referee: S O'Keeffe (St. Michael's)

8 August 1993 Quarter-final	Muskerry	2-19 - 2-10	Bishopstown	Ballincollig
	J O'Driscoll 1-10, TJ O'Leary 1-1, J Clifford 0-3, A Dorgan 0-2, M Kelleher 0-2, C O'Connell 0-1.		P McGrath 1-4, L Honohan 1-2, B Coffey 0-2, L Meaney 0-1, S Casey 0-1.	Referee: N Barrett (Carrigtwohill)

=== Semi-finals ===
22 August 1993 Semi-final	St. Finbarr's	0-10 - 0-08	Carbery	Macroom
	M Comyns 0-6, M Barry 0-1, M Slocum 0-1, J Keating 0-1, B O'Connell 0-1.		B Harte 0-4, P Hodnett 0-3, J Cotter 0-1.	Referee: S O'Keeffe (St. Michael's)

28 August 1993 Semi-final	Nemo Rangers	2-12 - 2-12	Mukserry	Innishannon
	C Corkery 2-2, J Kavanagh 0-3, E Fitzgerald 0-2, S O'Brien 0-2, P Lambert 0-1, S Calnan 0-1, N Corkery 0-1.		J O'Driscoll 2-3, J O'Leary 0-3, D Burke 0-1, K Concannon 0-1, C O'Connell 0-1, A Dorgan 0-1, M Kelleher 0-1, SF Cronin 0-1.	Referee: N Barrett

9 October 1993 Semi-final replay	Nemo Rangers	0-14 - 0-06	Mukserry	Innishannon
	C Corkery 0-8, P Lambert 0-2, S Fahy 0-2, E Fitzgerald 0-1, J Kavanagh 0-1.		A Dorgan 0-4, J Clifford 0-1, G Ring 0-1.	Referee: N Barrett

=== Final ===
31 October 1993 Final	Nemo Rangers	0-13 - 0-04	St. Finbarr's	Páirc Uí Chaoimh, Cork
	C Corkery 0-6, S Calnan 0-3, P Lambert 0-2, T Nation 0-1, E Fitzgerald 0-1.	Report	J Costello 0-2, M Comyns 0-2.	Attendance: 9,000

== Championship statistics ==
=== Top scorers ===
Overall

Rank	Player	Club	Tally	Total	Matches	Average
1	Colin Corkery	Nemo Rangers	4-36	48	6	8.00
2	John O'Driscoll	Muskerry	4-16	28	4	7.00
3	Mick McCarthy	O'Donovan Rossa	1-18	21	3	7.00
4	Joe Kavanagh	Nemo Rangers	3-11	20	6	3.33
4	Teddy McCarthy	Glanmire	0-20	20	3	6.66
6	Niall Corkery	Nemo Rangers	2-10	16	6	2.66
7	Michael Lewis	Aghada	0-12	12	2	6.00
7	Mick Comyns	St. Finbarr's	0-12	12	4	3.00
9	Seán F. Cronin	Muskerry	1-08	11	4	2.75
10	Declan Fagan	St. Nicholas'	0-10	10	2	5.00

In a single game

Rank	Player	Club	Tally	Total	Opposition
1	John O'Driscoll	Muskerry	1-10	13	Bishopstown
2	Colin Corkery	Nemo Rangers	1-09	12	UCC
3	John O'Driscoll	Muskerry	2-03	9	Nemo Rangers
3	Mick McCarthy	O'Donovan Rossa	0-09	9	Glanmire
5	Joe Kavanagh	Nemo Rangers	2-02	8	UCC
5	Colin Corkery	Nemo Rangers	2-02	8	Muskerry
5	Seán F. Cronin	Muskerry	1-05	8	Macroom
5	Niall Corkery	Nemo Rangers	1-05	8	O'Donovan Rossa
9	Colin Corkery	Nemo Rangers	1-04	7	O'Donovan Rossa
9	Paul McGrath	Bishopstown	1-04	7	Muskerry
9	Mick McCarthy	O'Donovan Rossa	0-07	7	Beara
9	Noel Twomey	Macroom	0-07	7	Muskerry
9	Michael Lewis	Aghada	0-07	7	Glanmire
9	Colin Corkery	Nemo Rangers	0-07	7	Imokilly
9	Teddy McCarthy	Glanmire	0-07	7	O'Donovan Rossa

=== Miscellaneous ===
- At the monthly meeting of the Cork County Board on 20 July 1993, Glanmire were fined £500 for their failure to fulfil their fixture with O'Donovan Rossa on 3 July. O'Donovan Rossa were entitled to be awarded the game, however, they sought a refixture of the game.
