= Niall Cahalane =

Irish retired Gaelic footballer

Personal information
- Native name: Niall Ó Cathaláin (Irish)
- Born: 25 September 1963 (age 63) Castlehaven, County Cork, Ireland
- Occupation: Auctioneer
- Height: 5 ft 11 in (180 cm)

Sport
- Sport: Gaelic football
- Position: Left corner-back
Clubs
- Years: Club
- 1979-2004 1986-1993: Castlehaven; Blackrock
Club titles
- Cork titles: 3
- Munster titles: 3
Inter-county
| Years | County | Apps (scores) |
| 1983-1997 | Cork | 36 (0-05) |
Inter-county titles
- Munster titles: 7
- All-Irelands: 2
- NFL: 1
- All Stars: 2

Niall Cahalane (born 25 September 1963) is an Irish former Gaelic footballer. His league and championship career at senior level with the Cork county team spanned fourteen seasons from 1983 to 1997.

== Football career ==
Born in Castlehaven, County Cork, Cahalane first played competitive Gaelic football at juvenile and underage levels with the Castlehaven club. After winning a number of divisional and county championship medals in all grades from under-12 to under-21, Cahalane joined the senior team in 1979. In a 25-year senior club career he won three Munster medals and three county senior championship medal. He also played hurling with Blackrock.

Cahalane made his debut on the inter-county scene at the age of seventeen when he was selected for the Cork minor team. He had one championship season with the minor team, culminating with the winning of an All-Ireland medal in 1981. Cahalane subsequently joined the Cork under-21 team and captained the team to the All-Ireland title in 1984. By this stage he had also joined the Cork senior team, making his debut during the 1983-84 league. Over the course of the next fourteen seasons, Cahalane won two All-Ireland medals as part of back-to-back triumphs in 1989 and 1990. He also won seven Munster medals and one National Football League medal. Cahalane's inter-county career ended in 1997 when he received a 48-week suspension.

After being chosen on the Munster inter-provincial team for the first time in 1985, Cahalane was a regular member of the starting fifteen at various times until 1997.

Cahalane was selected as a member of the Ireland team for the International Rules Series in both 1986 and 1987. The national team, with Cahalane playing in defence, claimed victory in the first series.

Even during his playing days Cahalane was involved in team management and coaching. He served as player-manager of the Castlehaven club, before becoming involved in all levels as a coach in his retirement. Cahalane has also served as a selector with the University College Cork team.

His son, Damien Cahalane, has also played Gaelic football and hurling.

== Career statistics ==
| Team | Season | Munster | | All-Ireland | | Total | |
| Team | Season | Apps | Score | Apps | Score | Apps | Score |
|---|---|---|---|---|---|---|---|
| Cork | 1984 | 2 | 0-00 | 0 | 0-00 | 2 | 0-00 |
| Cork | 1985 | 2 | 0-00 | 0 | 0-00 | 2 | 0-00 |
| Cork | 1986 | 2 | 0-00 | 0 | 0-00 | 2 | 0-00 |
| Cork | 1987 | 3 | 0-00 | 3 | 0-01 | 6 | 0-01 |
| Cork | 1988 | 2 | 0-00 | 3 | 0-00 | 5 | 0-00 |
| Cork | 1989 | 0 | 0-00 | 1 | 0-00 | 1 | 0-00 |
| Cork | 1990 | 2 | 0-00 | 2 | 0-00 | 4 | 0-00 |
| Cork | 1991 | 1 | 0-00 | 0 | 0-00 | 1 | 0-00 |
| Cork | 1992 | 1 | 0-00 | 0 | 0-00 | 1 | 0-01 |
| Cork | 1993 | 2 | 0-00 | 2 | 0-00 | 4 | 0-00 |
| Cork | 1994 | 2 | 0-00 | 1 | 0-00 | 3 | 0-00 |
| Cork | 1995 | 2 | 0-01 | 1 | 0-00 | 3 | 0-01 |
| Cork | 1996 | 2 | 0-02 | 0 | 0-00 | 2 | 0-02 |
| Cork | 1997 | 0 | 0-00 | 0 | 0-00 | 0 | 0-00 |
| Total | | 23 | 0-03 | 13 | 0-02 | 36 | 0-05 |

== Honours ==
Castlehaven

- Munster Senior Club Football Championship: 1989, 1994 (c), 1997
- Cork Senior Football Championship: 1989, 1994 (c), 2003
- Cork Under-21 Football Championship: 1981, 1983
- West Cork Under-21 Football Championship: 1980, 1981, 1982, 1983

Cork

- All-Ireland Senior Football Championship: 1989, 1990
- Munster Senior Football Championship: 1987, 1988, 1989, 1990, 1993, 1994, 1995 (c)
- National Football League: 1988–89
- All-Ireland Under-21 Football Championship: 1984 (c)
- Munster Under-21 Football Championship: 1982, 1984 (c)
- All-Ireland Minor Football Championship: 1981
- Munster Minor Football Championship: 1981

Ireland

- International Rules Series: 1986

Sporting positions
| Preceded by Steven O'Brien | Cork Senior Football Captain; 1995 | Succeeded by Mark O'Connor |
Awards and achievements
| Preceded by Eddie Gibbons | All-Ireland Under-21 Football Final winning captain 1984 | Succeeded by Tony Davis |
