= Ned Cleary =

Northern Irish Gaelic football coach and trainer (1930–2021)

Personal information
- Native name: Éamonn Ó Cléirigh (Irish)
- Born: 17 March 1930 Ballindine, County Mayo, Ireland
- Died: 6 March 2021 (aged 90) Castlehaven, County Cork, Ireland
- Occupation: Garda Síochána

Sport
- Sport: Gaelic football
Club management
- Years: Club
- 1968-1982: Castlehaven (trainer)

Edward P. Cleary (17 March 1930 – 6 March 2021) was an Irish Gaelic football coach and trainer.

== Biography ==
Born in Ballindine, County Mayo, Cleary joined the Castlehaven club after being stationed as a Garda in Castletownshend, County Cork. He had previously lined out with the Garda club in Cork. When his playing days ended he took over as team trainer, guiding the team to the South West junior B title tin 1969. The club's first ever divisional junior A title followed in 1973, followed by the County Junior Championship in 1976 and the County Intermediate Championship in 1978. After stepping down as trainer in 1982, Cleary took over as club chairman. His tenure saw the club win their very first County Senior Championship title in 1989, before later claiming the Munster Club Championship.

== Honours ==
Castlehaven

- Cork Intermediate Football Championship: 1978
- Cork Junior Football Championship: 1976
- South West Junior A Football Championship: 1973, 1976
- South West Junior B Football Championship: 1969
