= 1986 Cork Intermediate Football Championship =

Gaelic football competition

- Dates: 27 April - 17 August 1986
- Teams: 15
- Champions: Castletownbere (1st title); Liam O'Driscoll (captain); Donal Holland (manager)
- Runners-up: Kilshannig; John O'Mahony (manager)

Tournament statistics
- Matches played: 16
- Goals scored: 19 (1.19 per match)
- Points scored: 263 (16.44 per match)
- Top scorer(s): William O'Riordan (3-10)

The 1986 Cork Intermediate Football Championship was the 51st staging of the Cork Intermediate Football Championship since its establishment by the Cork County Board in 1909. The draw for the opening round fixtures took place on 26 January 1986. The championship ran from 27 April to 17 August 1986.

The final was played on 15 September 1985 at Páirc Uí Chaoimh in Cork, between O'Donovan Rossa and Glanmire, in what was their first ever meeting in the final. O'Donovan Rossa won the match by 3-11 to 0-08 to claim their second championship title overall and a first title in 61 years.

Kilshannig's William O'Riordan was the championship's top scorer with 3-10.

== Results ==
=== First round ===
27 April 1986 First round	Doneraile	0-11 - 1-08	Castletownbere	Páirc Abán
	P Harrington 0-4, J Landy 0-3, T Mannix 0-2, T Cole 0-1, P Nelligan 0-1.		M O'Sullivan 0-4, N Murphy 1-0, J Murphy 0-3, D O'Driscoll 0-1.

27 April 1986 First round	St. Finbarr's	0-12 - 1-10	Fermoy	Bride Rovers Park
	E Haynes 0-3, M Healy 0-3, K McCarthy 0-2, M Murphy 0-1, V Twomey 0-1, S Ryan 0-1, P Hayes 0-1.		W Frawley 0-5, S Dennehy 1-0, F O'Grourke 0-2, M Dolan 0-1, D Twomey 0-1, T Cooney 0-1.

27 April 1986 First round	Naomh Abán	0-09 - 1-06	Glanmire	Coachford Sportsfield
	D Healy 0-3, J Lynch 0-3, C Twomey 0-1, J Murphy 0-1, D McCarthy 0-1.		M Flynn 0-4, T McCarthy 1-0, C Hannon 0-1, D Kenneally 0-1.

27 April 1986 First round	Dohenys	0-07 - 1-20	Mallow	Coachford Sportsfield
	M Farr 0-2, H Ross 0-2, I Harrington 0-1, R Kelleher 0-1, C O'Rourke 0-1.		J Hayes 1-5, A Copps 0-4, D O'Donovan 0-4, R Sheehan 0-3, P Redmond 0-1, P Buckley 0-1, S Browne 0-1, D Murphy 0-1.

27 April 1986 First round	Mayfield	0-08 - 1-06	Nemo Rangers	Kilbarry Grounds
	M Hannon 0-3, F Mulvihill 0-3, D Crowley 0-1, J Conroy 0-1.		N Brady 1-1, D Murphy 0-2, B Sheehan 0-1, P O'Donovan 0-1, T Griffin 0-1.

27 April 1986 First round	Knocknagree	0-07 - 1-10	Kilshannig	Fr. Kelleher Park
	N O'Connor 0-4, D Kelleher 0-2, TJ O'Leary 0-1.		W O'Riordan 1-2, D O'Connell 0-3, P Murphy 0-2, P O'Connell 0-1, N Finnegan 0-1, L O'Callaghan 0-1.

27 April 1986 First round	Donoughmore	2-08 - 1-08	Douglas	Ovens Grounds
	G O'Rourke 1-4, D Buckley 1-0, S O'Regan 0-1, J O'Sullivan 0-1, D Dineen 0-1, P Barrett 0-1.		P Walsh 0-4, N Delay 1-0, D Larkin 0-2, P Lynch 0-1, M O'Regan 0-1.

3 May 1986 First round replay	Naomh Abán	0-07 - 2-09	Glanmire	Páirc Abán
	D Healy 0-4, P Healy 0-2, J Lynch 0-1.		M O'Flynn 1-4, B Óg Murphy 1-1, T Murphy 0-3, D Kenneally 0-1.

11 May 1986 First round replay	Doneraile	1-05 - 1-09	Castletownbere	Páirc Abán
	P Harrington 1-3, D Cahill 0-1, T Cole 0-1.		J Power 1-0, Martin O'Sullivan 0-3, Noel Murphy 0-2, O O'Sullivan 0-2, C Collins 0-1, Neil Murphy 0-1.

- Ballincollig received a bye in this round.

=== Quarter-finals ===
25 May 2022 Quarter-final	Kilshannig	0-07 - 0-06	Ballincollig	Blarney Grounds
	W O'Riordan 0-3, D O'Connell 0-2, P Murphy 0-1, P O'Connell 0-1.		E O'Connor 0-3, JJ Murphy 0-2, D O'Driscoll 0-1.

25 May 2022 Quarter-final	Mallow	0-11 - 0-07	Nemo Rangers	Blarney Grounds
	R Sheehan 0-4, P Healy 0-3, J Hayes 0-3, A Copps 0-1.		C Whelan 0-3, G O'Regan 0-1, P O'Donoghue 0-1, D Murphy 0-1, N Brady 0-1.

25 May 2022 Quarter-final	Castletownbere	1-08 - 1-06	Donoughmore	Aughaville Grounds
	J Murphy 1-1, M O'Sullivan 0-3, O O'Sullivan 0-1, Neil Murphy 0-1, Noel Murphy 0-1, B O'Driscoll 0-1.		D Moran 1-1, G O'Rourke 0-2, S O'Regan 0-1, D Buckley 0-1, J Kelleher 0-1.

25 May 2022 Quarter-final	Glanmire	0-10 - 0-03	Fermoy	Castlelyons Grounds
	T McCarthy 0-3, D Kenneally 0-2, D Walsh 0-2, C Hannon 0-1, M Flynn 0-1, B Óg Murphy 0-1.		W Frawley 0-1, D Twomey 0-1, P Dennehy 0-1.

=== Semi-finals ===
22 June 1986 Semi-final	Kilshannig	2-09 - 1-04	Mallow	Fr. Con Buckley Park
	W O'Riordan 2-3, J O'Donoghue 0-2, D O'Connell 0-2, P O'Connell 0-1, P Murphy 0-1.		P Redmond 1-0, R Sheehan 0-2, P Healy 0-2.

13 July 1986 Semi-final	Castletownbere	0-11 - 0-06	Glanmire	Páirc Abán
	M O'Sullivan 0-5, N Murphy 0-3, C Collins 0-1, O O'Sullivan 0-1, J Power 0-1.		C Hannon 0-2, T McCarthy 0-2, M O'Flynn 0-1, J Considine]

=== Final ===
17 August 1986 Final	Castletownbere	1-08 - 0-07	Kilshannig	Castle Grounds
	J Power 1-0, C Collins 0-3, M O'Sullivan 0-3, J Murphy 0-1, B O'Driscoll 0-1.		W O'Riordan 0-2, D O'Connell 0-2, P O'Connell 0-1, N Finnegan 0-1, P Murphy 0-1.	Referee: E Porter (Brian Dillons)

== Championship statistics ==
=== Top scorers ===
Overall

Rank	Player	Club	Tally	Total	Matches	Average
1	William O'Riordan	Kilshannig	3-10	19	4	4.75
2	Martin O'Sullivan	Castletownbere	0-18	18	5	3.60
3	Mick Flynn	Glanmire	1-10	13	4	3.25
4	Jody Hayes	Mallow	1-08	11	2	5.50
5	Pat Harrington	Doneraile	1-07	10	2	5.00
6	Gerard O'Rourke	Donoughmore	1-06	9	2	4.50
6	Dominic O'Connell	Kilshannig	0-09	9	2	4.50
6	Ronan Sheehan	Mallow	0-09	9	3	3.00
9	Teddy McCarthy	Glanmire	1-05	8	4	2.00
9	Johnny Murphy	Castletownbere	1-05	8	5	1.60

In a single game

Rank	Player	Club	Tally	Total	Opposition
1	William O'Riordan	Kilshannig	2-03	9	Mallow
2	Jody Hayes	Mallow	1-05	8	Dohenys
3	Gerard O'Rourke	Donoughmore	1-04	7	Douglas
3	Mick Flynn	Glanmire	1-04	7	Naomh Abán
5	Pat Harrington	Doneraile	1-03	6	Castletownbere
6	William O'Riordan	Kilshannig	1-02	5	Knocknagree
6	Willie Frawley	Fermoy	0-05	5	St. Finbarr's
6	Martin O'Sullivan	Castletownbere	0-05	5	Glanmire
