= 1994 Cork Senior Football Championship =

Gaelic football competition

- Dates: 1 May 1994 – 9 October 1994
- Teams: 22
- Champions: Castlehaven (2nd title); Niall Cahalane (captain); Jim Nolan (manager)
- Runners-up: O'Donovan Rossa; John O'Donovan (captain); Gene O'Driscoll (manager)

Tournament statistics
- Matches played: 23
- Goals scored: 41 (1.78 per match)
- Points scored: 431 (18.74 per match)
- Top scorer(s): Mick McCarthy (0-29)

The 1994 Cork Senior Football Championship was the 106th staging of the Cork Senior Football Championship since its establishment by the Cork County Board in 1887. The draw for the opening round fixtures took place at the Cork Convention on 12 December 1993. The championship began on 1 May 1994 and ended on 9 October 1994.

Nemo Rangers entered the championship as the defending champions, however, they were defeated by Castlehaven in the semi-final stage.

On 9 October 1994, Castlehaven won the championship following a 0-12 to 0-10 defeat of O'Donovan Rossa in a final replay. This was their second championship title overall and their first title since 1989.

O'Donovan Rossa's Mick McCarthy was the championship's top scorer with 0-29.

== Team changes ==
=== To Championship ===
Promoted from the Cork Intermediate Football Championship

- Bantry Blues

== Results ==
=== First round ===
1 May 1994 First round	St. Nicholas'	2-07 - 0-09	Imokilly	Riverstown Sportsfield, Sallybrook
	M Brosnan 1-1, D Fagan 0-4, K O'Neill 1-0, D Cooper 0-1, K Hendricks 0-1.		J Morgan 0-6, M Conroy 0-1, J O'Connell 0-1, S Collins 0-1.

2 May 1994 First round	University College Cork	2-10 - 2-06	Avondhu	Watergrasshill
	J Crowley 1-4, F Keohane 1-0, J Buckley 0-3, D Meade 0-1, S Moynihan 0-1, P Holland 0-1.		J O'Sullivan 1-2, T McGlinchey 1-0, M Carroll 0-2, D Ryan 0-2.	Referee: G Sweeney (Glenville)

2 May 1994 First round	Na Piarsaigh	0-12 - 2-09	Duhallow	Mallow
	M Mullins 0-6, J O'Meara 0-4, D Sheehan 0-2.		M O'Sullivan 1-2, N O'Connor 1-1, A Cronin 0-2, J Dennehy 0-2, D Culloty 0-1, JP O'Neill 0-1.	Referee: J Cummins (Glanworth)

2 May 1994 First round	Carbery	0-04 - 1-09	Bishopstown	Ovens
	B Harte 0-2, K Murray 0-1, F Collins 0-1.		P McGrath 0-7, N Fleming 1-1, D O'Mahony 0-1.	Referee: R O'Sullivan (Kilmurry)

6 May 1994 First round	Mallow	0-13 - 1-08	Clonakilty	Páirc Uí Chaoimh, Cork
	R Sheehan 0-4, M O'Donovan 0-3, R Cunningham 0-2, J Walsh 0-1, S Brown 0-1, F McCormack 0-1, M Fallon 0-1.		T Mannix 1-1, Paudie Griffin 0-3, B Walsh 0-2, K Meade 0-1, F O'Mahony 0-1.	Referee: J Kearney (Na Piarsaigh)

22 May 1994 First round	Castlehaven	1-13 - 1-06	Seandún	Clonakilty
	J Maguire 1-1, J Cleary 0-4, F Cahalane 0-2, D Cahalane 0-2, E Cleary 0-2, D O'Regan 0-1, N Cahalane 0-1.		D O'Regan 1-0, (og), K O'Brien 0-2, M O'Neill 0-2, B Egan 0-1, S O'Flynn 0-1.	Referee: M Collins (Clonakilty)

=== Second round ===
2 May 1994 Second round	Carrigdhoun	1-12 - 1-06	St Michael's	Páirc Uí Rinn, Cork
	C O'Donovan 1-4, A Crowley 0-4, J O'Mahony 0-2, M Hickey 0-1, J Fitzgerald 0-1.		D O'Connell 1-3, S Callanan 0-2, A Ryan 0-1.	Referee: E Murphy (Douglas)

7 May 1994 Second round	Glanmire	1-07 - 3-06	St. Finbarr's	Páirc Uí Rinn, Cork
	T McCarthy 1-2, G Murphy 0-2, D O'Donoghue 0-1, N Mulvihill 0-1, J Crowley 0-1.		F O'Mahony 1-2, B O'Shea 1-0, K Scanlon 1-0, P O'Keeffe 0-3, E Barrett 0-1.	Referee: S O'Keeffe (St. Michael's)

8 May 1994 Second round	Aghada	1-12 - 3-08	Bantry Blues	Innishannon
	R Lewis 1-7, S O'Keeffe 0-1, D Creedon 0-1, C Counihan 0-1, J Motherway 0-1, A Berry 0-1.		J Cotter 2-1, K Harrington 1-3, M Moran 0-2, G Barry 0-1, L O'Brien 0-1.	Referee: J Crowley (Kilmichael)

8 May 1994 Second round	University College Cork	1-09 - 1-13	Nemo Rangers	Bishopstown
	J Buckley 1-6, J Crowley 0-2, D Meade 0-1.		C Corkery 0-7, N Corkery 1-0, S Calnan 0-2, E Fitzgerald 0-2, P Lambert 0-2.	Referee: S O'Keeffe (St. Michael's)

28 May 1994 Second round	Bishopstown	2-11 - 0-06	St. Nicholas'	Páirc Uí Rinn, Cork
	P McGrath 0-6, B Murphy 1-2, N Fleming 1-1, A Buckley 0-1, L Honohan 0-1.		K O'Neill 0-3, D Fagan 0-1, N Burns 0-1, B O'Connell 0-1.

28 May 1994 Second round	Duhallow	2-09 - 1-09	Muskerry	Ballincollig
	D Culloty 1-1, M O'Sullivan 1-1, A Cronin 0-3, N O'Connor 0-2, J Dennehy 0-1, J Murphy 0-1.		P O'Mahony 0-4, K Concannon 1-0, J O'Driscoll 0-2, A Dorgan 0-1, N Twomey 0-1, G McPolin 0-1.	Referee: M Collins (Clonakilty)

29 May 1994 Second round	Beara	1-12 - 1-13	O'Donovan Rossa	Wolfe Tone Park, Bantry
	C O'Sullivan 1-5, S Spencer 0-3, R O'Dwyer 0-1, A O'Regan 0-1, Martin O'Sullivan 0-1, Michael O'Sullivan 0-1.		M McCarthy 0-8, G O'Driscoll 1-0, D Davis 0-2, B Casey 0-1, T Davis 0-1, J O'Driscoll 0-1.	Referee: N Barrett (Carrigtwohill)

3 June 1994 Second round	Castlehaven	0-12 - 1-07	Mallow	Páirc Liam Mhic Cárthaigh, Ballygarvan
	J Cleary 0-4, L Tompkins 0-3, J Maguire 0-2, E Cleary 0-1, P Cahalane 0-1, F Cahalane 0-1.		R Sheehan 1-4, S Murphy 0-1, J Walsh 0-1, R Cunningham 0-1.	Referee: E Murphy

=== Quarter-finals ===
3 July 1994 Quarter-final	O'Donovan Rossa	2-07 - 0-07	Bantry Blues	Sam Maguire Park, Dunmanway
	P Davis 1-1, M McCarthy 0-4, J O'Driscoll 1-0, B Casey 0-2.		J Cotter 0-2, K Harrington 0-2, M Moran 0-1, G Barry 0-1, L O'Brien 0-1.	Referee: M Collins (Clonakilty)

7 July 1994 Quarter-final	Nemo Rangers	0-11 - 1-05	Bishopstown	Páirc Uí Rinn, Cork
	S Calnan 0-4, C Corkery 0-4, J Kavanagh 0-2, S Fahy 0-1.		L Honohan 1-1, P McGrath 0-3, M Hayes 0-1.	Referee: N Barrett (Carrigtwohill)

8 July 1994 Quarter-final	St. Finbarr's	2-11 - 1-10	Carrigdhoun	Páirc Uí Rinn, Cork
	I O'Mahony 1-2, J Keating 0-5, E Barrett 1-0, F O'Mahony 0-2, B O'Shea 0-1, M Barry 0-1.		A Crowley 0-6, M Hickey 1-2, D Fitzgerald 0-1, C O'Donovan 0-1.	Referee: R O'Sullivan (Kilmurry)

10 July 1994 Quarter-final	Castlehaven	0-11 - 0-11	Duhallow	Coachford Sportsfield, Coachford
	J Cleary 0-4, L Tompkins 0-4, N Cahalane 0-2, J Maguire 0-1.		N O'Connor 0-4, J Dennehy 0-3, D Culloty 0-2, A Cronin 0-1, L Dennehy 0-1.	Referee: S O'Keeffe (St. Michael's)

20 August 1994 Quarter-final replay	Castlehaven	0-11 - 0-08	Duhallow	Coachford Sportsfield, Coachford
	J Cleary 0-4, L Tompkins 0-2, M O'Mahony 0-2, P Cahalane 0-1, J Maguire 0-1, E Cleary 0-1.		J Dennehy 0-2, N O'Connor 0-2, M O'Sullivan 0-1, D Culloty 0-1, A Cronin 0-1, L Dennehy 0-1.	Referee: S O'Keeffe (St. Michael's)

=== Semi-finals ===
31 July 1994 Semi-final	O'Donovan Rossa	1-09 - 0-09	St. Finbarr's	Clonakilty Sportsfield, Clonakilty
	M McCarthy 0-5, D McCarthy 1-0, T Davis 0-1, J O'Driscoll 0-1, A Byrne 0-1, P Davis 0-1.		J Keating 0-4, M Buckley 0-2, J Costello 0-1, B O'Shea 0-1, E Barrett 0-1.	Referee: N Barrett

3 September 1994 Semi-final	Castlehaven	0-12 - 0-11	Nemo Rangers	Charlie Hurley Park, Bandon
	L Tomkins 0-6, N Cahalan 0-2, J Cleary 0-2, E Cleary 0-2.		C Corkery 0-6, E Fitzgerald 0-3, P Lambert 0-1, D O'Sullivan 0-1.

=== Finals ===
25 September 1994 Final	Castlehaven	1-09 - 1-09	O'Donovan Rossa	Páirc Uí Chaoimh, Cork
	J Cleary 1-0, L Tompkins 0-2, J Maguire 0-2, L O'Connell 0-1, F Cahalane 0-1, M O'Mahony 0-1, N Cahalane 0-1, E Cleary 0-1.		M McCarthy 0-6, I Breen 1-0, B O'Donovan 0-2, D Davis 0-1.	Referee: N Barrett (Carrigtwohill)

9 October 1994 Final replay	Castlehaven	0-12 - 0-10	O'Donovan Rossa	Páirc Uí Chaoimh, Cork
	L Tompkins 0-6, E Cleary 0-4, J Maguire 0-1, M O'Mahony 0-1.		M McCarthy 0-6, D Davis 0-1, P Davis 0-1, M Bohane 0-1, J O'Driscoll 0-1.	Attendance: 19,560; Referee: N Barrett (Carrigtwohill)

== Championship statistics ==
=== Top scorers ===
Top scorers overall

Rank	Player	Club	Tally	Total	Matches	Average
1	Mick McCarthy	O'Donovan Rossa	0-29	29	5	5.80
2	Larry Tompkins	Castlehaven	0-23	23	6	3.83
3	John Cleary	Castlehaven	1-18	21	7	3.00
4	Colin Corkery	Nemo Rangers	0-17	17	3	5.33
5	Paul McGrath	Bishopstown	0-16	16	3	5.33
6	John Buckley	UCC	1-09	12	2	6.00
6	Niall O'Connor	Duhallow	1-09	12	4	3.00
8	Ronan Sheehan	Mallow	1-08	11	2	5.50
8	John Maguire	Castlehaven	1-08	11	7	1.57
8	Edmond Cleary	Castlehaven	0-11	11	6	1.83

Top scorers in a single game

Rank	Player	Club	Tally	Total	Opposition
1	Richie Lewis	Aghada	1-07	10	Bantry Blues
2	John Buckley	UCC	1-06	9	Nemo Rangers
3	Ciarán O'Sullivan	Beara	1-05	8	O'Donovan Rossa
3	Mick McCarthy	O'Donovan Rossa	0-08	8	Beara
5	Jeremy Cotter	Bantry Blues	2-01	7	Aghada
5	Ronan Sheehan	Mallow	1-04	7	Castlehaven
5	Johnny Crowley	UCC	1-04	7	Avondhu
5	Chris O'Donovan	Carrigdhoun	1-04	7	St Michael's
5	Paul McGrath	Bishopstown	0-07	7	Carbery
5	Colin Corkery	Nemo Rangers	0-07	7	UCC
