= Mick McCarthy (Gaelic footballer) =

Irish Gaelic footballer

Personal information
- Native name: Mícheál Mac Cárthaigh (Irish)
- Nickname: Small Mick
- Born: 8 May 1965 Skibbereen, County Cork, Ireland
- Died: 5 February 1998 (aged 32) Wilton, Cork, Ireland
- Occupation: Oil company area manager
- Height: 5 ft 10 in (178 cm)

Sport
- Sport: Gaelic football
- Position: Left corner-forward
Clubs
Years	Club	Apps (scores)
1982-1998 1983-1985	O'Donovan Rossa → Carbery	36 (15-170); 5 (1-10)
Club titles
- Cork titles: 1
- Munster titles: 1
- All-Ireland Titles: 1
Inter-county
Years	County	Apps (scores)
1985-1993	Cork	17 (3-22)
Inter-county titles
- Munster titles: 4
- All-Irelands: 2
- NFL: 1
- All Stars: 0

Michael McCarthy (8 May 1965 – 5 February 1998) was an Irish Gaelic footballer. At club level he played with O'Donovan Rossa and divisional side Carbery and was also a member of the Cork senior football team.

== Early life ==
Born and raised in Skibbereen, County Cork, Mick first played as a schoolboy in various juvenile competitions at St. Patrick's Boys' National School before later lining out as a student at St. Fachtna's De La Salle College in Cork. He was a member of the first St. Fachtna's team to win the Simcox Cup in 1981 before claiming the Corn Uí Mhuirí title in 1982.

== Club career ==
McCarthy began his club career during a four-year tenure with the O'Donovan Rossa under-12 team. After winning every available divisional title during that time, he also claimed a Cork U14FC title in 1977. McCarthy progressed through the various underage grades before winning a South West JAFC title in his first year at adult level in 1982. His performances in this grade earned selection to the Carbery divisional team from 1983 to 1985. McCarthy enjoyed further success with O'Donovan Rossa when he won a Cork U21FC title after a one-point defeat of St. Finbarr's in 1984.

After losing consecutive Cork IFC finals in 1983 and 1984, McCarthy was on the winning side when O'Donovan Rossa beat Glanmire by 3-11 to 0-08 in the 1985 final. He also ended the championship as top scorer with 0-30. After seven years in the senior grade, McCarthy was team captain when O'Donovan Rossa beat Nemo Rangers by five points to win the 1992 Cork SFC final. After securing the Munster Club Championship title after a defeat of St. Senan's, he guided O'Donovan Rossa to a defeat of Éire Óg in the 1993 All-Ireland club final replay. McCarthy was top scorer at county, provincial and national level throughout the 1992-93 season after scoring 6-60 across all three competitions.

McCarthy was top scorer for the 1994 Cork SFC campaign which eventually ended with O'Donovan Rossa being beaten by Castlehaven in the final. His last championship game for the club was an 11-point defeat by University College Cork in the 1997 second round.

== Inter-county career ==
McCarthy began a two-year association with the Cork minor football team in 1982. After little success in his first year on the team, he won a Munster MFC medal the following year before losing the 1983 All-Ireland minor final to Derry. After leaving the minor grade, McCarthy was immediately drafted onto the under-21 team. He never lost a game during his three-year tenure with the team and won three consecutive All-Ireland U21FC medals from 1984 to 1986. During this time, McCarthy was also drafted onto the Cork junior football team and he claimed a winners' medal in that grade after a 22-point defeat of Warwickshire in the 1984 All-Ireland junior final.

McCarthy earned a call-up to the Cork senior football team while he was still in the under-21 grade when he was listed as a substitute for Cork's 1985 Munster semi-final game against Tipperary. He played in a number of National League games over the following few seasons before soon making the championship starting fifteen. McCarthy scored two points from left corner-forward in the 1988 Munster final defeat of Kerry, but was held scoreless in the 1988 All-Ireland final replay defeat by Meath.

McCarthy lost his place on the starting fifteen the following year, but won a National League title and a second consecutive Munster SFC medal as a non-playing substitute. He was again listed as a substitute for the 1989 All-Ireland final against Mayo, but collected a winners' medal after coming on as a substitute for Shea Fahy in the 0-17 to 1-11 victory. McCarthy was back on the starting fifteen a year later and won a third consecutive Munster SFC medal. He scored two points from left corner-forward as Cork retained the All-Ireland SFC title following an 0-11 to 0-09 win over Meath in the 1989 All-Ireland final.

O'Donovan Rossa's 1992 county final triumph paved the way for McCarthy to take over the Cork captaincy for the 1993 season. He won a fourth Munster SFC medal after a defeat of Tipperary before leading Cork to a defeat by Derry in the 1993 All-Ireland final.

== Death ==
McCarthy was returning from a hare coursing meeting in Clonmel when he was involved in a road traffic accident at the then-unfinished Dunkettle Interchange in Cork on 4 February 1998. He suffered extensive injuries and died at Cork University Hospital on 5 February 1998, aged 33. McCarthy was the first member of Cork's 1989-1990 All-Ireland-winning teams to die.

== Honours ==
St. Fachtna's College

- Corn Uí Mhuirí: 1982
- Simcox Cup: 1981

O'Donovan Rossa

- All-Ireland Senior Club Football Championship: 1993 (c)
- Munster Senior Club Football Championship: 1992 (c)
- Cork Senior Football Championship: 1992 (c)
- Cork Intermediate Football Championship: 1985
- South West Junior A Football Championship: 1982
- Cork Under-21 Football Championship: 1984

Cork

- All-Ireland Senior Football Championship: 1989, 1990
- Munster Senior Football Championship: 1988, 1989, 1990, 1993 (c)
- National Football League: 1988–89
- All-Ireland Junior Football Championship: 1984
- Munster Junior Football Championship: 1984
- All-Ireland Under-21 Football Championship: 1984, 1985, 1986
- Munster Under-21 Football Championship: 1984, 1985, 1986
- Munster Minor Football Championship: 1983

Sporting positions
Preceded by Danny Culloty	Cork senior football team captain 1993	Succeeded by Steven O'Brien
Achievements
Preceded by Seánie O'Shea	All-Ireland Senior Club Football Final winning captain 1993	Succeeded by Steven O'Brien
