= 1985 Cork Intermediate Football Championship =

Gaelic football competition

- Dates: 20 April - 15 September 1985
- Teams: 19
- Champions: O'Donovan Rossa (2nd title); Tim Healy (captain)
- Runners-up: Glanmire; Tony Lenihan (captain)

Tournament statistics
- Matches played: 20
- Goals scored: 37 (1.85 per match)
- Points scored: 294 (14.7 per match)
- Top scorer(s): Mick McCarthy (0-30)

The 1985 Cork Intermediate Football Championship was the 50th staging of the Cork Intermediate Football Championship since its establishment by the Cork County Board in 1909. The draw for the opening round fixtures took place on 27 January 1985. The championship ran from 20 April to 15 September 1985.

The final was played on 15 September 1985 at Páirc Uí Chaoimh in Cork, between O'Donovan Rossa and Glanmire, marking their first ever meeting in the final. O'Donovan Rossa won the match by 3-11 to 0-08 to claim their second championship title overall and a first title in 61 years.

O'Donovan Rossa's Mick McCarthy was the championship's top scorer with 0-30.

== Results ==
=== First round ===
28 April 1985 First round	St. Finbarr's	1-09 - 2-04	St. Vincent's	Kilbarry Grounds
	J O'Callaghan 1-3, T Power 0-3, D O'Mahony 0-1, V Twomey 0-1, F Scannell 0-1.		R O'Donovan 1-2, F Crowley 1-0, D Murray 0-1, P Cunningham 0-1.

28 April 1985 First round	Fermoy	0-06 - 2-06	O'Donovan Rossa	Innsihannon Grounds
	S Dennehy 0-2, J Lonergan 0-2, J Casey 0-1, C Hogan 0-1.		M McCarthy 0-4, D O'Driscoll 1-0, H Thornhill 0-1, A Davis 0-1, F Kearney 0-1.

28 April 1985 First round	Doneraile	1-12 - 1-07	Ballincollig	Donoughmore Grounds
	P Harrington 0-6, T Mannix 1-2, T Cole 0-2, J Harrington 0-1, K Stack 0-1.		D O'Leary 0-2, F Daly 0-2, C O'Connell 0-1, P Nolan 0-1, L Lowney 0-1.

=== Second round ===
20 April 1985 Second round	Grange	1-03 - 0-09	Glanmire	Bride Rovers Park
	F O'Grourke 1-0, J Roche 0-2, J McCarthy 0-1.		T Murphy 0-2, J Ryan 0-2, T McCarthy 0-1,

28 April 1985 Second round	Castletownbere	3-11 - 1-05	Mitchelstown	St. Mary's Park
	J Murphy 2-1, G Murphy 1-2, C Collins 0-3, M O'Sullivan 0-2, B O'Driscoll 0-1, O O'Sullivan 0-1, F McCarthy 0-1.		G Mulcahy 1-0, D Russell 0-3, W Kenneally 0-1, M Shinnick 0-1.

28 April 1985 Second round	Naomh Abán	0-05 - 0-10	Mallow	Millstreet Grounds
	J Hall 0-2, P Healy 0-1, J Murphy 0-1, D McCarthy 0-1.		A Copps 0-4, P Redmond 0-2, D Murphy 0-1, J Hayes 0-1, P O'Sullivan 0-1, D O'Donovan 0-1.

28 April 1985 Second round	Dohenys	0-05 - 0-05	Mayfield	Newcestown Grounds
	D Lordan 0-3, B Herlihy 0-1, B Hayes 0-1.		F Mulvihill 0-2, R O'Connell 0-1, J McCarthy 0-1, L Neville 0-1.

5 May 1985 Second round	Nemo Rangers	1-07 - 0-04	Kildorrery	O'Connell Park
	D Linehan 1-1, C Whelan 0-4, C Murphy 0-1, P O'Donovan 0-1.		A O'Connor 0-2, A Monaghan 0-1, J Fouhy 0-1.

5 May 1985 Second round	Donoughmore	1-06 - 1-10	Knocknagree	Kanturk Grounds
	J O'Sullivan 1-1, P Corkery 0-3, D Dineen 0-1, G O'Rourke 0-1.		N O'Connor 1-4, D Kelleher 0-3, P O'Connor 0-2, D O'Connor 0-1.

19 May 1985 Second round	St. Finbarr's	2-06 - 3-13	O'Donovan Rossa	Henry Ford Park
	T Power 1-0, V Twomey 1-0, J O'Callaghan 0-3, I Hennessy 0-2, R Barrett 0-1.		M McCarthy 0-9, N Crowley 1-1, M Culhane 1-0, T Salter 1-0, A Davis 0-1, D O'Driscoll 0-1, D O'Sullivan 0-1.

28 May 1985 Second round replay	Dohenys	1-05 - 0-05	Mayfield	Newcestown Grounds
	B Herlihy 1-0, D Herlihy 0-2, C O'Rourke 0-1, D Lordan 0-1, B Herlihy 0-1.		L Neville 0-2, J Neville 0-1, P Burns 0-1, D Kennedy 0-1.

2 June 1985 Second round	Doneraile	0-09 - 2-10	Douglas	Mallow Grounds
	P Harrington 0-3, T Cole 0-2, J Landy 0-1, T Healy 0-1, T Mannix 0-1, B Stack 0-1.		P Walsh 1-5, E Forde 1-2, B Newton 0-2, D Hurley 0-1.

=== Quarter-finals ===
30 June 1985 Quarter-final	Knocknagree	0-10 - 0-07	Nemo Rangers	Ballingeary Grounds
	N O'Connor 0-7, N O'Connor 0-2, D Kelleher 0-2.		C Whelan 0-3, G O'Regan 0-2, D Daly 0-1, P O'Driscoll 0-1.

6 July 1985 Quarter-final	Glanmire	2-11 - 1-06	Mallow	Blarney Grounds
	B Óg Murphy 1-2, P Neville 1-1, T Murphy 0-3, D Crowley 0-3, D Kenneally 0-1, J Ryan 0-1.		A Copps 0-5, P O'Sullivan 1-0, D Murphy 0-1.

6 July 1985 Quarter-final	O'Donovan Rossa	2-10 - 1-09	Douglas	Sam Maguire Park
	M McCarthy 0-6, M Hodnett 1-0, C O'Mahony 1-0, A Davis 0-2, J Evans 0-1, M Cahalane 0-1.		P Walsh 1-0, D Larkin 0-3, E Forde 0-2, J O'Brien 0-1, J Horgan 0-1, T Hurley 0-1, D Hurley 0-1.

14 July 1985 Quarter-final	Castletownbere	2-10 - 1-06	Dohenys	St. Colum's Grounds
	F McCarthy 1-1, N Murphy 1-0, O O'Sullivan 0-3, M O'Sullivan 0-3, C Collins 0-2, J Murphy 0-1.		J Farrell 1-0, D Herlihy 0-3, B Herlihy 0-1, K Sheehan 0-1, J Collins 0-1.

=== Semi-finals ===
31 August 1985 Semi-final	Glanmire	0-13 - 1-05	Castletownbere	Sam Maguire Park
	B Óg Murphy 0-3, T Murphy 0-2, P Neville 0-2, P Barry 0-2, J Ryan 0-2, B Lotty 0-1, T McCarthy 0-1.		N Murphy 1-2, B O'Driscoll 0-1, O O'Sullivan 0-1, M O'Sullivan 0-1.

31 August 1985 Semi-final	O'Donovan Rossa	0-12 - 1-04	Knocknagree	Cloughduv Grounds
	M McCarthy 0-5, M Cahalane 0-2, D O'Donovan 0-1, D Walsh 0-1, C O'Regan 0-1, C O'Mahony 0-1, T Salter 0-1.		D O'Connor 1-1, B O'Connor 0-1, N O'Connor 0-1, P O'Connor 0-1.

=== Final ===
15 September 1985 Final	O'Donovan Rossa	3-11 - 0-08	Glanmire	Páirc Uí Chaoimh
	C O'Regan 2-1, M McCarthy 0-6, N Crowley 1-1, D O'Donovan 0-2, D Walsh 0-1.		T Murphy 0-3, T McCarthy 0-2, B Lotty 0-1, B Óg Murphy 0-1, J Ryan 0-1.	Referee: J Dennigan (Fermoy)

== Championship statistics ==
=== Top scorers ===
Overall

Rank	Player	Club	Tally	Total	Matches	Average
1	Mick McCarthy	O'Donovan Rossa	0-30	30	5	6.00
2	Niall O'Connor	Knocknagree	1-12	15	3	5.00
3	Pat Walsh	Douglas	2-05	11	2	6.50
4	Tadhg Murphy	Glanmire	2-05	11	4	2.75
5	Jamesie O'Callaghan	St. Finbarr's	1-06	9	2	4.50
5	Bertie Óg Murphy	Glanmire	1-06	9	4	2.25
5	Pat Harrington	Doneraile	0-09	9	2	4.50
5	Alan Copps	Mallow	0-09	9	2	4.50

In a single game

Rank	Player	Club	Tally	Total	Opposition
1	Mick McCarthy	O'Donovan Rossa	0-09	9	St. Finbarr's
2	Pat Walsh	Douglas	1-05	8	Doneraile
3	Jimmy Murphy	Castletownbere	2-01	7	Mitchelstown
3	Cathal O'Regan	O'Donovan Rossa	2-01	7	Glanmire
3	Niall O'Connor	Knocknagree	1-04	7	Donoughmore
3	Niall O'Connor	Knocknagree	0-07	7	Nemo Rangers
7	Jamesie O'Callaghan	St. Finbarr's	1-03	6	St. Vincent's
7	Pat Harrington	Doneraile	0-06	6	Ballincollig
7	Mick McCarthy	O'Donovan Rossa	0-06	6	Douglas
7	Mick McCarthy	O'Donovan Rossa	0-06	6	Glanmire

=== Miscellaneous ===
- O'Donovan Rossa win their first Intermediate title since 1924, having lost the last two finals.
