= 1992 Cork Senior Football Championship =

Gaelic football competition

- Dates: 2 May 1992 – 13 September 1992
- Teams: 21
- Champions: O'Donovan Rossa (1st title); Mick McCarthy (captain); Gene O'Driscoll (manager)
- Runners-up: Nemo Rangers; Neil Creedon (captain); Dinny Allen (manager)

Tournament statistics
- Matches played: 21
- Goals scored: 41 (1.95 per match)
- Points scored: 397 (18.9 per match)
- Top scorer(s): Mick McCarthy (3-26)

The 1992 Cork Senior Football Championship was the 104th staging of the Cork Senior Football Championship since its establishment by the Cork County Board in 1887. The draw for the opening fixtures took place on 15 December 1991. The championship began on 2 May 1992 and ended on 13 September 1992.

Duhallow entered the championship as the defending champions, however, they were defeated by O'Donovan Rossa in the second round.

On 13 September 1992, O'Donovan Rossa won the championship following a 2-09 to 0-10 defeat of Nemo Rangers in the final. It remains their only championship title.

O'Donovan Rossa's Mick McCarthy was the championship's top scorer with 3-26.

== Team changes ==
=== To Championship ===
Promoted from the Cork Intermediate Football Championship

- Aghada

== Results ==
=== First round ===
2 May 1992 First round	Muskerry	3-15 - 0-07	Na Piarsaigh	Ballincollig
	TJ O'Leary 1-2, G Manley 1-2, P O'Mahony 0-3, D Lynch 0-3, M Kelleher 0-3, A Dineen 0-1, A Dorgan 0-1.		T O'Sullivan 0-4, K Butterworth 0-1, J O'Connor 0-1, G Daly 0-1.	Referee: S O'Keeffe (St. Michael's)

2 May 1992 First round	Castlehaven	1-16 - 0-05	Seandún	Cloughduv
	L Tompkins 1-7, F Collins 0-3, E Cleary 0-2, M Burns 0-2, F Cahalane 0-1, P Cahalane 0-1.		B Egan 0-2, A Costello 0-1, B Huggins 0-1, B Harrington 0-1.	Referee: R Murphy

3 May 1992 First round	Clonakilty	2-09 - 1-10	Avondhu	Páirc Uí Chaoimh, Cork
	M de Long 1-1, K Meade 1-1, T Dillon 0-2, E O'Mahony 0-2, F O'Mahony 0-1, B Walsh 0-1, F Lyons 0-1.		P Harrington 0-4, J O'Sullivan 1-0, R Sheehan 0-2, C O'Sullivan 0-1, P Buckley 0-1, J Barrett 0-1, P O'Connell 0-1.	Referee: E Porter

3 May 1992 First round	O'Donovan Rossa	2-13 - 1-08	Imokilly	Páirc Uí Chaoimh, Cork
	M McCarthy 1-5, J Brady 0-5, I Breen 0-2, P Davis 0-1.		C O'Neill 0-6, K Hennessy 1-0, K Murphy 0-1, J O'Connor 0-1.	Referee: S O'Keeffe (St. Michael's)

3 May 1992 First round	Carrigdhoun	2-03 - 0-10	Beara	Páirc Garbh, Glengarriff
	D Fitzgerald 1-1, G Cummins 1-0, C O'Donovan 0-1, P Healy 0-1.		C O'Sullivan 0-5, M Harrington 0-2, J Power 0-1, E Harrington 0-1, B Crowley 0-1.	Referee: M Brosnan (Caheragh)

=== Second round ===
2 May 1992 Second round	Carbery	1-05 - 1-06	Aghada	Páirc Uí Chaoimh, Cork
	P Goggin 1-0, B Harte 0-2, B O'Herlihy 0-1.		M Hennessy 1-0, R Lewis 0-3, P Cashman 0-1, K O'Keeffe 0-1, J Motherway 0-1.	Referee: L O'Flynn (Éire Óg)

3 May 1992 Second round	Glanmire	2-10 - 2-13	UCC	Mayfield
	G Murphy 1-2, T McCarthy 0-5, C O'Leary 1-0, B Mulvihill 0-2, D O'Donoghue 0-1.		C O'Dwyer 0-7, F Keohane 2-0, K O'Brien 0-2, D Ahern 0-1, C Collins 0-1, N Donlon 0-1, N Noonan 0-1.	Referee: L O'Flynn (Éire Óg)

3 May 1992 Second round	St. Nicholas'	0-05 - 0-12	Bishopstown	Ballincollig
	D Fagan 0-2, N Burns 0-1, J Coughlan 0-1, T Browne 0-1.		P McGrath 0-6, L Honohan 0-3, R Oldham 0-2, N Fleming 0-1.	Referee: N Barrett (Carrigtwohill)

3 May 1992 Second round	St Michael's	0-05 - 0-13	Macroom	Carrigadrohid
	I Aherne 0-2, A Ryan 0-2, M O'Donovan 0-1.		N Twomey 0-4, J Neville 0-3, G Hall 0-2, F Corrigan 0-1, J O'Connor 0-1, G Casey 0-1, JJ Murphy 0-1.

6 June 1992 Second round	Nemo Rangers	2-12 - 1-06	Beara	Sam Maguire Park, Dunmanway
	C Corkery 1-6, D O'Sullivan 1-0, J Kavanagh 0-3, S Fahy 0-2, P O'Donoghue 0-1.		M O'Sullivan 1-0, C O'Sullivan 0-2, S Harrington 0-1, M Harrington 0-1, J Power 0-1, S Spencer 0-1.	Referee: M Collins (Clonakilty)

6 June 1992 Second round	St. Finbarr's	0-12 - 0-12	Castlehaven	Clonakilty
	J Keating 0-7, M Slocum 0-2, T Power 0-1, M Comyns 0-1, J Griffin 0-1.		J Cleary 0-6, L Tompkins 0-5, M Burns 0-1.	Referee: N Barrett

28 June 1992 Second round	Duhallow	0-09 - 2-09	O'Donovan Rossa	Macroom
	J Dennehy 0-4, J Casey 0-2, N O'Connor 0-1, D O'Connor 0-1, L Dennehy 0-1.		M McCarthy 1-4, P Davis 1-1, D Davis 0-2, J Brady 0-1, J O'Driscoll 0-1.	Referee: N Barrett (Carrigtwohill)

28 June 1992 Second round	Clonakilty	0-07 - 1-14	Muskerry	Charlie Hurley Park, Bandon
	E O'Mahony 0-4, B Walsh 0-1, M de Long 0-1, C O'Donovan 0-1.		P O'Mahony 1-8, G Manley 0-2, TJ O'Leary 0-2, J O'Driscoll 0-1, T O'Reilly 0-1.	Referee: G Harrington (Carrigaline)

4 July 1992 Second round replay	St. Finbarr's	0-10 - 0-14	Castlehaven	Clonakilty
	J Keating 0-6, T Leahy 0-1, I O'Mahony 0-1, T Power 0-1, J Griffin 0-1.		L Tompkins 0-4, J Cleary 0-3, E Cleary 0-2, D Cahalane 0-1, F Cahalane 0-1, M Burns 0-1, N Cahalane 0-1, M O'Mahony 0-1.	Referee: N Barrett

=== Quarter-final ===
4 July 1992 Quarter-final	Nemo Rangers	1-12 - 1-03	University College Cork	Bishopstown
	C Corkery 0-5, D O'Sullivan 1-1, S Calnan 0-3, T Dalton 0-2, P Lambert 0-1.		F Keohane 1-0, C Collins 0-1, K O'Dwyer 0-1, K O'Brien 0-1.	Referee: E Porter (Brian Dillons)

25 July 1992 Quarter-final	Aghada	0-13 - 0-07	Macroom	Páirc Uí Chaoimh, Cork
	M Lewis 0-4, D Devoy 0-2, R Lewis 0-2, D Creedon 0-2, S O'Keeffe 0-1, K O'Keeffe 0-1, P Cashman 0-1.		N Twomey 0-5, JJ Murphy 0-2.	Referee: S O'Keeffe (St. Michael's)

25 July 1992 Quarter-final	Bishopstown	4-03 - 0-11	Castlehaven	Charlie Hurley Park, Bandon
	N Fleming 2-0, K Crowley 1-1, A Buckley 1-0, M McGrath 0-2.		J Cleary 0-7, D O'Regan 0-1, N Cahalane 0-1, M Burns 0-1, E Cleary 0-1.	Referee: G Harrington

26 July 1992 Quarter-final	O'Donovan Rossa	2-12 - 1-11	Muskerry	Sam Maguire Park, Dunmanway
	M McCarthy 1-8, P Davis 1-2, N Murphy 0-1, J O'Driscoll 0-1.		P O'Mahony 1-5, G Manley 0-2, N McDonagh 0-1, K Creed 0-1, D Lynch 0-1, J O'Leary 0-1.	Referee: W Barrett

=== Semi-finals ===
9 August 1992 Semi-final	O'Donovan Rossa	1-08 - 0-06	Aghada	Cloughduv
	J Bardy 1-1, M McCarthy 0-4, N Murphy 0-2, D Davis 0-1.		M Lewis 0-2, M Crowley 0-2, R Dwane 0-1, P Cashman 0-1.	Referee: R Murphy (Lyre)

22 August 1992 Semi-final	Nemo Rangers	4-11 - 1-11	Bishopstown	Páirc Uí Chaoimh, Cork
	J Kavanagh 2-1, C Corkery 0-6, P Lambert 1-1, J Kerrigan 1-0, P O'Donovan 0-1, T Nation 0-1, T Dalton 0-1.		P McGrath 0-6, L Meaney 1-0, L Honohan 0-3, A Buckley 0-1, A O'Donovan 0-1.	Referee: N Barrett (Carrigtwohill)

=== Final ===
13 September 1992 Final	O'Donovan Rossa	2-09 - 0-10	Nemo Rangers	Páirc Uí Chaoimh, Cork
	J O'Driscoll 1-2, M McCarthy 0-5, B O'Donovan 1-0, J Brady 0-2.		C Corkery 0-4, P Lambert 0-3, S Calnan 0-1, J Kerrigan 0-1, J Kavanagh 0-1.	Attendance: 9,618; Referee: R Murphy

== Championship statistics ==
=== Top scorers ===
Overall

Rank	Player	Club	Tally	Total	Matches	Average
1	Mick McCarthy	O'Donovan Rossa	3-26	35	5	7.00
2	Colin Corkery	Nemo Rangers	1-21	24	4	6.00
3	Podsie O'Mahony	Muskerry	2-16	22	3	7.33
4	Larry Tompkins	Castlehaven	1-16	19	4	4.75
5	John Cleary	Castlehaven	0-16	16	4	4.00
6	Jim Keating	St. Finbarr's	0-13	13	2	6.50
7	John Brady	St. Finbarr's	1-09	12	5	2.40
7	Paul McGrath	Bishopstown	0-12	12	2	6.00
9	Joe Kavanagh	Nemo Rangers	2-05	11	4	2.75
10	Ger Manley	Muskerry	1-06	9	3	3.00
10	Noel Twomey	Macroom	0-09	9	2	4.50

In a single game

Rank	Player	Club	Tally	Total	Opposition
1	Podsie O'Mahony	Muskerry	1-08	11	Clonakilty
1	Mick McCarthy	O'Donovan Rossa	1-08	11	Muskerry
3	Larry Tompkins	Castlehaven	1-07	10	Seandún
4	Colin Corkery	Nemo Rangers	1-06	9	Beara
5	Mick McCarthy	O'Donovan Rossa	1-05	8	Imokilly
5	Podsie O'Mahony	Muskerry	1-05	8	O'Donovan Rossa
7	Joe Kavanagh	Nemo Rangers	2-01	7	Bishopstown
7	Mick McCarthy	O'Donovan Rossa	1-04	7	Duhallow
7	Karl O'Dwyer	UCC	0-07	7	Glanmire
7	Jim Keating	St. Finbarr's	0-07	7	Castlehaven
7	John Cleary	Castlehaven	0-07	7	Bishopstown

=== Miscellaneous ===
- O'Donovan Rossa qualify for the final for the first time.
- O'Donovan Rossa win their first senior title.
- Nemo Rangers lose a final for only the second time.
