= Michael Burns (Gaelic footballer) =

Irish Gaelic footballer

Personal information
- Native name: Mícheál Ó Broin (Irish)
- Born: 1961 Castlehaven, County Cork, Ireland
- Died: 5 May 2015 (aged 54) Union Hall, County Cork, Ireland
- Occupation: Eircom employee

Sport
- Sport: Gaelic Football
- Position: Midfielder
Club
- Years: Club
- Castlehaven
Club titles
- Cork titles: 1
- Munster titles: 1
Inter-county*
Years	County	Apps (scores)
1981-1990	Cork	8 (0-5)
Inter-county titles
- Munster titles: 0
- All-Irelands: 0
- NFL: 0
- All Stars: 0
- *Inter County team apps and scores correct as of 12:03, 10 May 2015.

Michael Burns (1961 – 5 May 2015) was an Irish Gaelic footballer who played as a midfielder for the Cork senior team.

Born in Castlehaven, County Cork, Burns first arrived on the inter-county scene at the age of seventeen when he first linked up with the Cork minor team before later joining the under-21 side. He made his senior debut during the 1981-82 league. Burns later became a regular member of the team and won one All-Ireland medal, two Munster medals and one National Football League medal as a non-playing substitute.

At club level Burns was a one-time Munster medallist with Castlehaven. In addition to this he has also won one championship medal.

Throughout his career Burns made 8 championship appearances. He retired from inter-county football following the conclusion of the 1990 championship.

== Honours ==
=== Player ===
Castlehaven

- Munster Senior Club Football Championship (3): 1989, 1994 (sub), 1997 (sub)
- Cork Senior Football Championship (3): 1989, 1994 (sub), 1997 (sub)

Cork

- All-Ireland Senior Football Championship (1): 1989 (sub)
- Munster Senior Football Championship (3): 1988 (sub), 1989 (sub)
- National Football League (1): 1989-90
- All-Ireland Under-21 Football Championship (2): 1980, 1981
- Munster Under-21 Football Championship (3): 1980 (sub), 1981, 1982 (c)
