= 1976 Cork Junior Football Championship =

- Dates: 10 October – 28 November 1976
- Teams: 8
- Champions: Castlehaven (1st title); Christy Collins (captain)
- Runners-up: Castletownbere; Ger Batt O'Sullivan (captain)

Tournament statistics
- Matches played: 7
- Goals scored: 26 (3.71 per match)
- Points scored: 84 (12 per match)
- Top scorer(s): T. J. O'Regan (0–12)

The 1976 Cork Junior Football Championship was the 78th staging of the Cork Junior Football Championship since its establishment by Cork County Board in 1895.

The final was played on 28 November 1976 at Sam Maguire Park in Dunmanway, between Castlehaven and Castletownbere, in what was their first ever meeting in the final. Castlehaven won the match by 3–07 to 0–06 to claim their first ever championship title.

Castlehaven's T. J. O'Regan was the championship's top scorer with 0–12.

== Qualification ==
Division	Championship	Champions
Avondhu	North Cork Junior A Football Championship	Kilshannig
Carbery	South West Junior A Football Championship	Castlehaven
Carrigdhoun	South East Junior A Football Championship	Kinsale
Duhallow	Duhallow Junior A Football Championship	Rockchapel
Imokilly	East Cork Junior A Football Championship	Cloyne
Muskerry	Mid Cork Junior A Football Championship	Éire Óg
Seandún	City Junior A Football Championship	Delaney Rovers

== Results ==
=== Quarter-finals ===
10 October 1976 Quarter-final	Castlehaven	1–09 – 1–03	Delaney Rovers	St Mary's Park
	TJ O'Regan 0-5, D Minihane 1-1, D Crowley 0-1, F Collins 0-1, C Collins 0-1.		P Murphy 1-1, J Barry 0-1, D Kickham 0-1.

10 October 1976 Quarter-final	Castletownbere	4–12 – 5–02	Kinsale	Rossa Park
	F McCarthy 2-0, S O'Sullivan 1-1, M Hanley 0-4, O O'Sullivan 1-0, T O'Sullivan 0-2, M O'Driscoll 0-2, D Wiseman 0-1, M O'Sullivan 0-1, J O'Neill 0-1.		T Fogarty 1-1, E McCarthy 1-0, M Burke 1-0, D Dunne 1-0, J O'Sullivan 1-0, J Hurley 0-1.

17 October 1976 Quarter-final	Rockchapel	3–04 – 2–05	Kilshannig	Banteer Sportsfield
	M Stack 2-2, J Collins 1-0, S Curtin 0-1, C Guiney 0-1.		J Horgan 1-2, P Kiely 1-0, J Murphy 0-1, T Lucey 0-1, É O'Sullivan 0-1.

31 October 1976 Quarter-final	Cloyne	1–09 – 2–04	Éire Óg	Páirc Uí Chaoimh
	G O'Sullivan 1-1, T Canavan 0-4, N Cusack 0-1, T O'Sullivan 0-1, D O'Brien 0-1, T O'Shea 0-1.		D Desmond 0-4, J O'Leary 1-0, D McSweeney 1-0.

=== Semi-finals ===
31 October 1976 Semi-final	Castletownbere	3–08 – 0–04	Rockchapel	Castle Grounds
	S O'Sullivan 1-2, F McCarthy 1-0, M O'Driscoll 1-0, M Hanley 0-2, T O'Sullivan 0-2, M O'Sullivan 0-1, S Mullins 0-1.		M Stack 0-3, DA O'Mahony 0-1.

14 November 1976 Semi-final	Castlehaven	0–11 – 1–00	Cloyne	Páirc Uí Chaoimh
	TJ O'Regan 0-4, D Crowley 0-3, J O'Donovan 0-1, D Minihane 0-1, F Collins 0-1, D Collins 0-1.		K O'Shea 1-0.

=== Final ===
28 November 1976 Final	Castlehaven	3–07 – 0–06	Castletownbere	Sam Maguire Park
	D Crowley 1-3, D Collins 1-0, D Minihane 1-0, TJ O'Regan 0-3, J O'Donovan 0-1.		M Hanley 0-3, F McCarthy 0-1, M O'Driscoll 0-1, T O'Sullivan 0-1.

== Championship statistics ==
=== Top scorers ===
Rank	Player	Club	Tally	Total	Matches	Average
1	T. J. O'Regan	Castlehaven	0-12	12	3	4.00
2	Mick Stack	Rockchapel	2-05	11	2	5.50
3	Finbarr McCarthy	Castletownbere	3-01	10	3	3.33
3	Denis Crowley	Castlehaven	1-07	10	3	3.33
5	Seánie O'Sullivan	Castletownbere	2-03	9	3	3.00
5	Mick Hanley	Castletownbere	0-09	9	3	3.00
