= 1984 All-Ireland Under-21 Football Championship =

Gaelic football competition

Championship details

All-Ireland Champions
- Winning team: Cork (5th win)
- Captain: Niall Cahalane

All-Ireland Finalists
- Losing team: Mayo

Provincial Champions
- Munster: Cork
- Leinster: Dublin
- Ulster: Down
- Connacht: Mayo

The 1984 All-Ireland Under-21 Football Championship was the 21st staging of the All-Ireland Under-21 Football Championship since its establishment by the Gaelic Athletic Association in 1964.

Mayo entered the championship as defending champions.

On 26 August 1984, Cork won the championship following a 0–9 to 0–6 defeat of Mayo in the All-Ireland final. This was their fifth All-Ireland title overall and their first in three championship seasons.

== Results ==
=== All-Ireland Under-21 Football Championship ===
Semi-finals

5 August 1984 Semi-final	Mayo	0-09 - 0-07	Dublin	Pearse Park, Longford

5 August 1984 Semi-final	Cork	2-12 - 0-12	Down	Croke Park, Dublin

Finals

26 August 1984 Final	Cork	0-09 - 0-06	Mayo	Cusack Park, Ennis
