= 1983 Cork Intermediate Football Championship =

Gaelic football competition

- Champions: Passage (1st title); Ciarán O'Reilly (captain)
- Runners-up: O'Donovan Rossa

The 1983 Cork Intermediate Football Championship was the 48th staging of the Cork Intermediate Football Championship since its establishment by the Cork County Board in 1909.

The final replay was played on 30 October 1983 at the Ballinspittle Grounds, between Passage and O'Donovan Rossa, in what was their first ever meeting in the final. Passage won the match by 1-06 to 0-07 to claim their first ever championship title.

== Results ==
=== Final ===
16 October 1983 Final	Passage	0-07 - 0-07	O'Donovan Rossa	Ballinspittle Grounds

30 October 1983 Final replay	Passage	1-06 - 0-07	O'Donovan Rossa	Ballinspittle Grounds
