= 1978 Cork Intermediate Football Championship =

Gaelic football competition

- Teams: 18
- Champions: Castlehaven (1st title)
- Runners-up: St. Finbarr's

The 1978 Cork Intermediate Football Championship was the 43rd staging of the Cork Intermediate Football Championship since its establishment by the Cork County Board in 1909.

The final was played on 20 August 1978 at Charlie Hurley Park in Bandon, between Castlehaven and St. Finbarr's, in what was their first ever meeting in the final. Castlehaven won the match by 0-08 to 0-03 to claim their first ever championship title.

== Results ==
=== Final ===
20 August 1978 Final	Castlehaven	0-08 - 0-03	Naomh Abán	Charlie Hurley Park
