= 1992–93 All-Ireland Senior Club Football Championship =

Irish Football Championship

- Dates: 4 October 1992 – 28 March 1993
- Teams: 33
- Champions: O'Donovan Rossa (1st title); Mick McCarthy (captain); Gene O'Driscoll (manager)
- Runners-up: Éire Óg; Noel Fallon (captain); Bobby Miller (manager)

Tournament statistics
- Matches played: 34
- Top scorer(s): Mick McCarthy (3-34)

The 1992–93 All-Ireland Senior Club Football Championship was the 23rd staging of the All-Ireland Senior Club Football Championship since its establishment by the Gaelic Athletic Association in 1970-71. The championship began on 4 October 1992 and ended on 28 March 1993.

Dr. Crokes entered the championship as the defending champions, however, they were beaten by O'Donovan Rossa in the Munster Club Championship.

On 28 March 1993, O'Donovan Rossa won the championship following a 1–07 to 0–08 defeat of Éire Óg in the All-Ireland final replay at Croke Park. It remains their only championship title.

O'Donovan Rossa's Mick McCarthy was the championship's top scorer with 3-34.

== Connacht ==
=== Quarter-final ===
11 October 1992 Quarter-final	Monivea-Abbey	0-12 - 0-08	Shamrock Gaels	Tuam Stadium
	T Devane 0-7, D Maher 0-3, G Blake 0-1, T Mannion 0-1.		L Quinn 0-3, B Mulhern 0-2, P Deignan 0-1, C Cairns 0-1, E Deignan 0-1.

=== Semi-finals ===
25 October 1992 Semi-final	Knockmore	2-13 - 0-05	Monivea-Abbey	St. Joseph's Park
	K O'Neill 1-3, P Brogan 0-5, J Davis 1-1, K Staunton 0-2, R Dempsey 0-1, P Butler 0-1.		T Devane 0-3, T Mannion 0-2, P Mannion 0-1.

8 November 1992 Semi-final	Strokestown	1-07 - 1-09	Aughawillan	Orchard Park
	L Dolan 1-4, T Corcoran 0-1, J Towey 0-1, D Donlon 0-1.		P Prior 0-5, M Quinn 1-1, F Smyth 0-1, T Quinn 0-1, P Flanagan 0-1.

=== Final ===
22 November 1992 Final	Aughawillan	0-07 - 4-04	Knockmore	Páirc Achadh Mhaoileann
	P Flanagan 0-6, D Darcy 0-1.		K O'Neill 2-0, R Dempsey 1-1, K Staunton 1-0, J Davis 0-1, P Brogan 0-1, M Reape 0-1.

== Leinster ==
=== First round ===
24 October 1992 First round	Baltinglass	2-10 - 0-04	Ferbane	Aughrim County Ground
	R McHugh 1-3, P Kenny 1-2, K O'Brien 0-2, R Danne 0-1, T Murphy 0-1, B Kilcoyne 0-1.		B Lowry 0-4.

24 October 1992 First round	Skryne	1-07 - 4-09	Éire Óg	Dr Cullen Park
	C O'Rourke 1-2, T Giles 0-3, M O'Dowd 0-1, D Smyth 0-1.		A Keating 1-5, C Hayden 2-0, J Hayden 1-2, N Fallon 0-1, G Ware 0-1.

24 October 1992 First round	Duffry Rovers	1-10 - 1-05	Mostrim	Páirc Uí Shíocháin
	L Rafter 1-1, N Fitzhenry 0-4, S Fitzhenry 0-2, A Jordan 0-2, P Fitzhenry 0-1.		D Doherty 1-0, M O'Hara 0-3, G Lynn 0-1, B Connell 0-1.

25 October 1992 First round	Ballyroan	0-11 - 1-05	Railyard	O'Moore Park
	L Irwin 0-5, J Whelan 0-3, E McDonald 0-2, PJ Delaney 0-1.		N Dowd 1-0, F Lowry 0-3, M Buggy 0-1, B Smith 0-1.

=== Quarter-finals ===
7 November 1992 Quarter-final	Duffry Rovers	0-13 - 2-08	Clan na Gael	Wexford Park
	L Rafter 0-6, S Fitzhenry 0-3, N Fitzhenry 0-2, G Fitzhenry 0-1, J Casey 0-1.		S White 1-7, B McKeever 1-0, M Kerely 0-1.

7 November 1992 Quarter-final	Éire Óg	2-07 - 0-09	Clane	Dr Cullen Park
	A Keating 1-2, C Hayden 1-0, J Hayden 0-2, T Nolan 0-1, N Fallon 0-1, G Ware 0-1.		P McLoughlin 0-6, B Farrell 0-1, R Dunne 0-1, M Commiff 0-1.

7 November 1992 Quarter-final	Baltinglass	2-12 - 2-08	Mullingar Shamrocks	Aughrim County Ground
	R McHugh 1-4, K O'Brien 1-4, P Kenny 0-2, D McMahon 0-2.		B Flynn 2-2, P Faulkner 0-1, M O'Reilly 0-1, B Sex 0-1, D Corroon 0-1, P Ahearne 0-1, E Casey 0-1.

21 November 1992 Quarter-final	Ballyroan	1-05 - 1-04	Kilmacud Crokes	O'Moore Park
	E McDonald 1-1, J Irwin 0-1, N Delaney 0-1, J Gee 0-1, J Whelan 0-1.		M Dillon 1-0, P Ward 0-1, P Walsh 0-1, P O'Donoghue 0-1, M Leahy 0-1.

=== Semi-finals ===
22 November 1992 Semi-final	Éire Óg	0-08 - 0-07	Baltinglass	Geraldine Park
	J Murphy 0-2, A Keating 0-2, C Hayden 0-1, G Ware 0-1, T Nolan 0-1, J Morrissey 0-1.		R McHugh 0-4, K O'Brien 0-1, T Murphy 0-1, D McMahon 0-1.

13 December 1992 Semi-final	Ballyroan	1-06 - 0-06	Clan na Gael	Páirc Tailteann
	J Whelan 1-2, L Irwin 0-3, N Delaney 0-1.		S White 0-5, S Dixon 0-1.

=== Final ===
24 January 1993 Final	Éire Óg	2-05 - 1-07	Ballyroan	St Conleth's Park
	A Keating 2-2, J Hayden 0-1, N Fallon 0-1, G Ware 0-1.		E McDonald 1-2, L Irwin 0-3, J Whelan 0-2.

== Munster ==
=== First round ===
25 October 1992 First round	Newcastle West	1-05 - 2-15	O'Donovan Rossa	Newcastle West Sportsground
	P Meehan 1-0, J Power 0-3, N Hennessy 0-2.		J Brady 1-4, M McCarthy 0-5, D Davis 1-1, N Murphy 0-2, J O'Driscoll 0-1, P Davis 0-1, B O'Donovan 0-1.

8 November 1992 First round	Loughmore–Castleiney	2-07 - 3-12	St Senan's	MacDonagh Park
	S Bohan 1-0, T Cullen 1-0, T McGrath 0-3, P McGrath 0-1, M McGrath 0-1, J Tracey 0-1, M Ormond 0-1.		N Roche 1-3, J Darby 1-1, G Keane 1-1, J Murray 0-4, D Russell 0-2, N McGrath 0-1.

=== Semi-finals ===
22 November 1992 Semi-final	St Senan's	1-09 - 0-07	Dungarvan	Páirc Naomh Seanáin
	D Russell 1-1, J Murray 0-3, J MGravey 0-2, N McGrath 0-1, G Crotty 0-1, N Roche 0-1.		P Ferncombe 0-2, E Burke 0-1, D Lyons 0-1, D Callaghan 0-1, D Burke 0-1, JJ Ferncombe 0-1.

22 November 1992 Semi-final	O'Donovan Rossa	1-08 - 1-05	Dr Crokes	Rossa Park
	M McCarthy 1-2, P Davis 0-2, J Brady 0-2, J O'Driscoll 0-1, T Davis 0-1.		P O'Shea 1-2, G O'Shea 0-2, N O'Leary 0-1.

=== Final ===
6 December 1992 Final	O'Donovan Rossa	2-13 - 0-12	St Senan's	FitzGerald Stadium
	M McCarthy 0-6, B O'Donovan 1-0, P Davis 1-0, J Brady 0-3, J O'Driscoll 0-2, T Davis 0-2.		D Russell 0-6, J Murray 0-3, N Roche 0-2, G Keane 0-1.

== Ulster ==
=== Preliminary round ===
11 October 1992 Preliminary round	Ramor United	0-08 - 0-09	Lavey	Breffni Park
	M Lynch 0-2, G Farrelly 0-2, D McDonnell 0-1, B McDonnell 0-1, S Cole 0-1, F Comey 0-1.		B McCormick 0-4, D Mulholland 0-3, J McGurk 0-1, S Downey 0-1.

=== Quarter-finals ===
4 October 1992 Quarter-final	Scotstown	0-10 - 0-05	Pearse Óg	Páirc Mhuire
	G McCarville 0-4, C Morgan 0-3, B McNeill 0-1, R McCarron 0-1, D McPhillips 0-1.		G Harney 0-2, G Houlihan 0-1, F Harney 0-1, P Turley 0-1.

4 October 1992 Quarter-final	Lámh Dhearg	1-07 - 3-13	Burren	Casement Park
	M Boyle 1-2, P Buchanan 0-2, P McCambridge 0-2, F Fitzsimons 0-1.		T Fagan 2-3, J Treanor 0-5, J McAlinden 1-1, C Murdoch 0-2, J Murdoch 0-1, B McKiernan 0-1.

25 October 1992 Quarter-final	Lavey	0-09 - 0-07	Moortown St Malachy's	Dean McGlinchey Park
	B McCormick 0-3, D Mulholland 0-2, S Downey 0-2, G McGuirk 0-1, O Collins 0-1.		M Quinn 0-3, S Lawn 0-3, C Quinn 0-1.

25 October 1992 Quarter-final	Killybegs	0-11 - 0-06	Enniskillen Gaels	Fr Tierney Park
	Manus Boyle 0-7, Mark Boyle 0-2, T Hegarty 0-1, B McGowan 0-1.		W Dickson 0-2, S Bradley 0-2, G Love 0-1, E Beresford 0-1.

=== Semi-finals ===
25 October 1992 Semi-final	Burren	3-08 - 0-08	Scotstown	Athletic Grounds
	J Treanor 2-3, T Fagan 1-3, G Murdoch 0-1, J McAlinden 0-1.		G McGurk 0-3, G McCarville 0-2, C Morgan 0-1, N McKenna 0-1, B Murray 0-1.

8 November 1992 Semi-final	Lavey	0-11 - 1-07	Killybegs	Healy Park
	B McCormack 0-5, S Downey 0-4, D Mulholland 0-1, C McGuirk 0-1.		T Hegarty 1-0, M Boyle 0-3, B McGowan 0-2, P Kinsella 0-1, D Boyle 0-1.

=== Final ===
22 November 1992 Final	Lavey	0-10 - 0-10	Burren	Athletic Grounds
	F Rafferty 0-3, B McCormick 0-2, S Downey 0-2, C McGurk 0-1, D Mulholland 0-1, J McGurk 0-1.		J Treanor 0-6, J McAlinden 0-2, B McKernan 0-1, T Fegan 0-1.

6 December 1992 Final replay	Lavey	0-11 - 1-05	Burren	Athletic Grounds
	B McCormick 0-3, S Downey 0-2, J McGurk 0-2, HM McGurk 0-1, F Rafferty 0-1, D Mulholland 0-1, C McGurk 0-1.		J McAlinden 1-2, J Treanor 0-1, B Laverty 0-1, T Fegan 0-1.

== Quarter-final ==
13 December 1992 Quarter-final	Tír Chonaill Gaels	1-07 - 0-12	Lavey	Emerald GAA Grounds
	T McBride 1-4, T Maguire 0-1, J Duffy 0-1, S Faulkner 0-1.		S Downey 0-3, B McCormack 0-2, F Rafferty 0-2, C McGurk 0-2, J McGurk 0-1, D Mulholland 0-1, J Chivers 0-1.

== Semi-finals ==
21 February 1993 Semi-final	Knockmore	0-09 - 2-05	Éire Óg	St Joseph's Park
	K O'Neill 0-7, P Brogan 0-2.		A Keating 1-3, C Hayden 1-1, J Morrissey 0-1.

21 February 1993 Semi-final	Lavey	0-04 - 2-10	O'Donovan Rossa	Dean McGlinchey Park
	J McGurk 0-1, B McCormack 0-1, D Mulholland 0-1, C McGurk 0-1.		M McCarthy 1-9, J Brady 1-0, B O'Donovan 0-1.

== Final ==
17 March 1993 Final	O'Donovan Rossa	1-12 - 3-06	Éire Óg	Croke Park
	M McCarthy 1-8, B O'Donovan 0-1, J O'Driscoll 0-1, B Carmody 0-1, N Murphy 0-1.		H Brennan 1-2, A Keating 1-1, J Hayden 1-0, C Hayden 0-1, T Nolan 0-1, A Callinan 0-1.

28 March 1993 Final replay	O'Donovan Rossa	1-07 - 0-08	Éire Óg	Gaelic Grounds
	P Davis 1-2, M McCarthy 0-4, J O'Driscoll 0-1.		A Keating 0-4, G Ware 0-2, J Hayden 0-1, B Hayden 0-1.

== Statistics ==
=== Top scorers ===
Overall

Rank	Player	Club	Tally	Total	Matches	Average
1	Mick McCarthy	O'Donovan Rossa	3-34	43	6	7.16
2	Anthony Keating	Éire Óg	6-19	37	7	5.28
3	John Treanor	St. Mary's, Burren	2-15	21	4	5.25
4	Brian McCormick	Lavey	0-20	20	7	2.85
5	Kevin O'Neill	Knockmore	3-10	19	3	6.44
6	Tom Fagan	St. Mary's, Burren	3-08	17	4	4.25
6	Robert McHugh	Baltinglass	2-11	17	4	4.25
7	John Brady	O'Donovan Rossa	2-09	15	6	2.50
8	Colm Hayden	Éire Óg	4-03	15	7	2.14
8	Stefan White	Clan na Gael	1-12	15	2	7.50

In a single game

Rank	Player	Club	Tally	Total	Opposition
1	Mick McCarthy	O'Donovan Rossa	1-09	12	Lavey
2	Mick McCarthy	O'Donovan Rossa	1-08	11	Éire Óg
3	Stefan White	Clan na Gael	1-07	10	Duffry Rovers
4	Tom Fagan	St. Mary's, Burren	2-03	9	Lámh Dhearg
4	John Treanor	St. Mary's, Burren	2-03	9	Scotstown
5	Bernard Flynn	Mullingar Shamrocks	2-02	8	Baltinglass
5	Anthony Keating	Éire Óg	2-02	8	Ballyroan
5	Anthony Keating	Éire Óg	1-05	8	Skryne
6	Luke Dolan	Strokestown	1-04	7	Aughawillan
6	Robert McHugh	Baltinglass	1-04	7	Mullingar Shamrocks
6	Kevin O'Brien	Baltinglass	1-04	7	Mullingar Shamrocks
6	John Brady	O'Donovan Rossa	1-04	7	Newcastle West
6	Timmy McBride	Tír Chonaill Gaels	1-04	7	Lavey
6	Tommy Deavne	Monivea-Abbey	0-07	7	Shamrock Gaels
6	Manus Boyle	Killybegs	0-07	7	Enniskillen Gaels
6	Kevin O'Neill	Knockmore	0-07	7	Éire Óg

=== Miscellaneous ===
- Éire Óg won the Leinster Club Championship for the first time in their history. They also became the first club from Carlow to win the title.
