= 1989–90 All-Ireland Senior Club Football Championship =

Irish Football Championship

- Teams: 33
- Champions: Baltinglass (1st title); Brian Fitzpatrick (captain)
- Runners-up: Clann na nGael; Paul McManus (captain)

Provincial Champions
- Munster: Castlehaven
- Leinster: Baltinglass
- Ulster: Scotstown
- Connacht: Clann na nGael

The 1989–90 All-Ireland Senior Club Football Championship was the 20th staging of the All-Ireland Senior Club Football Championship since its establishment by the Gaelic Athletic Association in 1970-71.

Nemo Rangers were the defending champions, however, they failed to qualify after being beaten by St Finbarr's in the semi-final of 1989 Cork County Championship.

On 17 March 1990, Baltinglass won the championship following a 2-07 to 0-07 defeat of Clann na nGael in the All-Ireland final at Croke Park. It remains their only championship title.

== Connacht Senior Club Football Championship ==
=== Connacht final ===
10 December 1989 Final	Clann na nGael	3-10 - 0-07	Knockmore	St Brigid's Park
	T McManus 1-5, E McManus Jnr 1-2, P Naughton 1-0, P McManus 0-1, E Dorney 0-1, T Lennon 0-1.		R Dempsey 0-3, A Molloy 0-2, P Brogan 0-1, E McHale 0-1.

== Leinster Senior Club Football Championship ==
=== Leinster final ===
26 November 1989 Final	Baltinglass	1-06 - 1-06	Thomas Davis	St Conleth's Park
	K O'Brien 1-0, R McHugh 0-3, P Kenny 0-1, C Murphy 0-1, T Murphy 0-1.		P Dwan 1-0, L Adamson 0-3, V Carney 0-3.

=== Leinster final replay ===
10 December 1989 Final replay	Baltinglass	1-09 - 0-11	Thomas Davis	St Conleth's Park
	K O'Brien 1-2, R McHugh 0-4, P Kenny 0-1, T Murphy 0-1, B Kenny 0-1.		L Adamson 0-5, P Nugent 0-3, S Grealis 0-1, V Carney 0-1, P Dwane 0-1.

== Munster Senior Club Football Championship ==
=== Munster first round ===
15 October 1989 First round	Claughaun	0-04 - 2-10	St Senan's	Bruff Sportsfield
	P Galligan 0-2, D Fitzgerald 0-1, L O'Connor 0-1.		John Murray 1-3, D O'Donoghue 1-1, T O'Neill 0-3, G Jordan 0-1, P O'Shea 0-1, J Enright 0-1.

15 October 1989 First round	Clonmel Commercials	0-05 - 2-11	Laune Rangers	Clonmel Sportsground
	F Kelly 0-2, C McGrath 0-2, D O'Keeffe 0-1.		G Murphy 1-7, M O'Reilly 1-0, B O'Sullivan 0-2, T Byrne 0-1, P Griffin 0-1.

=== Munster semi-finals ===
12 November 1989 Semi-final	Laune Rangers	0-08 - 1-11	Castlehaven	FitzGerald Stadium
	T Fleming 0-5, B O'Sullivan 0-2, A Shannon 0-1.		L Tompkins 0-5, J Cleary 1-1, F Collins 0-4, MC O'Mahony 0-1.

26 November 1989 Semi-final	St Senan's	2-14 - 2-04	Kilrossanty	Páirc Naomh Seanáin
	John Murray 1-4, P O'Shea 1-3, T O'Neill 0-3, G Fitzpatrick 0-1, D O'Donoghue 0-1, J Enright 0-1, Jimmy Murray 0-1.		T Keating 2-0, J Maher 0-2, G Walsh 0-1, P Hayes 0-1.

=== Munster final ===
10 December 1989 Final	Castlehaven	0-13 - 1-08	St Senan's	FitzGerald Stadium
	L Tompkins 0-5, J Cahalane 0-3, F Collins 0-2, M O'Mahony 0-1, M Burns 0-1, E Cleary 0-1.		T O'Neill 0-4, John Murray 0-4, D O'Donoghue 1-0.

== All-Ireland Senior Club Football Championship ==
=== All-Ireland quarter-final ===
28 January 1990 Quarter-final	Clann na nGael	2-09 - 1-04	Kingdom Kerry Gaels	St Brigid's Park
	E Durney 1-4, O McManus 1-1, E McManus Jnr 0-2, J McMnaus 0-1, E McManus Snr 0-1.		J Landry 1-2, T McDonnell 0-1, J Doyle 0-1.

=== All-Ireland semi-finals ===
18 February 1990 Semi-final	Clann na nGael	1-08 - 0-06	Scotstown	St Brigid's Park
	T McManus 1-1, E Durney 0-3, J McManus 0-2, E McManus Jnr 0-2.		R McCarron 0-3, J McCarville 0-2, M Caulfield 0-1.

18 February 1990 Semi-final	Baltinglass	1-05 - 0-06	Castlehaven	Aughrim Park
	P Kenny 1-0, K O'Brien 0-3, C Murphy 0-2.		L Tompkins 0-4, M Burns 0-1, J Cleary 0-1.

=== All-Ireland final ===
17 March 1990 Final	Baltinglass	2-07 - 0-07	Clann na nGael	Croke Park
	C Murphy 2-3, R McHugh 0-3, K O'Brien 0-1.		E McManus 0-2, E Durney 0-2, T McManus 0-2, T Lennon 0-1.

== Statistics ==
=== Miscellaneous ===
- Clann na nGael became the first team to win six successive Connacht Club Championship titles.
- St Vincent's won the Leinster Club Championship for the first time in their history. They were also the first team from Dublin to win the provincial title.
