= 1983 All-Ireland Under-21 Football Championship =

Gaelic football competition

Championship details

All-Ireland Champions
- Winning team: Mayo (3rd win)
- Captain: Eddie Gibbons

All-Ireland Finalists
- Losing team: Derry

Provincial Champions
- Munster: Kerry
- Leinster: Kildare
- Ulster: Derry
- Connacht: Mayo

The 1983 All-Ireland Under-21 Football Championship was the 20th staging of the All-Ireland Under-21 Football Championship since its establishment by the Gaelic Athletic Association in 1964.

Donegal entered the championship as defending champions, however, they were defeated by Derry in the Ulster final.

On 30 October 1983, Mayo won the championship following a 1-8 to 1-5 defeat of Derry in a replay of the All-Ireland final. This was their third All-Ireland title overall and their first title in nine championship seasons.

== Results ==
=== Leinster Under-21 Football Championship ===
24 July
Final

| Kildare | 1-13 - 1-08 | Louth |
|---|---|---|
| Tompkins 0-5(4f), O'Neill 1-0, Dalton 0-2, Sex 0-2, Murphy 0-2, Ryan 0-1, Fahy 0-1 | | Hosford 0-3(1f), McKenna 1-0, Litchfield 0-2, Rogers 0-1, Bradley 0-1, O'Hare 0-1(f) |

Páirc Tailteann, Navan
Referee: T.Collins (Meath)

| GK | 1 | Kevin Nolan (Sarsfields) (c) |
| RCB | 2 | Pat Bermingham (Carbury) |
| FB | 3 | Anthony McLoughlin (Athy) |
| LCB | 4 | Eamonn Henry (Athy) |
| RHB | 5 | Vincent Meredith (Monasterevin) |
| CHB | 6 | Mick Fogarty (St Laurence's) |
| LHB | 7 | John McLoughlin (Eadestown) |
| MF | 8 | Seán Ryan (St Laurence's) |
| MF | 9 | Shea Fahy (Sarsfields) |
| RHF | 10 | Ger Donnelly (Castlemitchell) |
| CHF | 11 | Larry Tompkins (Eadestown) |
| LHF | 12 | Joe Murphy (Sarsfields) |
| RCF | 13 | Pat O'Neill (Carbury) |
| FF | 14 | Bill Sex (Moorefield) |
| LCF | 15 | Davy Dalton (Kilcock) |

| GK | 1 | Paul O'Brien (Mattock Rangers) |
| RCB | 2 | Liam Reilly (Cooley Kickhams) |
| FB | 3 | Mal Hickey (Mattock Rangers) |
| LCB | 4 | Niall Lambert (Dundalk Gaels) |
| RHB | 5 | Peter Judge (Newtown Blues) |
| CHB | 6 | Peter Fitzpatrick (Clan na Gael) |
| LHB | 7 | Barry O'Brien (Seán O'Mahony's) |
| MF | 8 | Packie O'Connor (Clan na Gael) |
| MF | 9 | Liam Bradley (Newtown Blues) |
| RHF | 10 | Enda Sheridan (Glyde Rangers) |
| CHF | 11 | Gerard Doyle (Newtown Blues) |
| LHF | 12 | Vincent Litchfield (Kilkerley Emmets) |
| RCF | 13 | Joey Hosford (Cooley Kickhams) |
| FF | 14 | Malachy Rogers (Geraldines) |
| LCF | 15 | Gerry Reynolds (Stabannon Parnells) |
Substitutes:
| | 16 | Fergal O'Hare (Kilkerley Emmets) for Judge |
| | 17 | Denis McKenna (St Bride's) for Doyle |
| | 18 | Niall McCartan (Cooley Kickhams) for O'Connor |

=== All-Ireland Under-21 Football Championship ===
Semi-finals

| 25 September 1983 Semi-final | Mayo | 3-06 - 0-07 | Kerry | Cusack Park, Ennis |

| 25 September 1983 Semi-final | Derry | 0-11 - 1-06 | Kildare | St. Tiernach's Park, Clones |

Finals

| 16 October 1983 Final | Mayo | 2-05 - 1-08 | Derry | Páirc Seán Mac Diarmada, Carrick |

| 30 October 1983 Final replay | Mayo | 1-08 - 1-05 | Derry | St. Molaise Park, Irvinestown |

== Statistics ==
=== Miscellaneous ===
- The All-Ireland final ends in a draw and goes to a replay for the second time in three years.
