= 1994–95 All-Ireland Senior Club Football Championship =

Irish Football Championship

- Dates: 2 October 1994 – 17 March 1995
- Teams: 33
- Champions: Kilmacud Crokes (1st title); Mick Dillon (captain); Tommy Lyons (manager)
- Runners-up: Bellaghy; Danny Quinn (captain); Tommy Doherty (manager)

Tournament statistics
- Matches played: 35

The 1994–95 All-Ireland Senior Club Football Championship was the 25th staging of the All-Ireland Senior Club Football Championship since its establishment by the Gaelic Athletic Association in 1970-71. The championship began on 2 October 1994 and ended on 17 March 1995.

Nemo Rangers were the defending champions, however, they failed to qualify after being beaten by Castlehaven in the semi-final of the 1994 Cork County Championship.

On 17 March 1995, Kilmacud Crokes won the championship following an 0-08 to 0-05 defeat of Bellaghy in the All-Ireland final at Croke Park. It was their first ever championship title.

== Connacht ==
=== Quarter-final ===
| 9 October 1994 Quarter-final | Tourlestrane | 1-14 - 0-15 | Roscommon Gaels | Tourlestrane GAA Park |
| | A Brennan 0-8, G McGowan 1-0, M Walsh 0-3, E O'Hara 0-1, D Durkin 0-1, T Carty 0-1. | | F O'Donnell 0-5, R Shannon 0-4, K McStay 0-2, C Hennigan 0-1, A Nolan 0-1, B Penney 0-1, L McNeill 0-1. |

=== Semi-finals ===
| 6 November 1994 Semi-final | Aughawillan | 1-08 - 0-09 | Hollymount | Páirc Achadh Mhaoileann |
| | Peter Prior 1-3, D Darcy 0-5. | | J Jennings 0-6, N Stagg 0-1, P Walsh 0-1, PJ Coen 0-1. |

| 20 November 1994 Semi-final | Tourlestrane | 1-05 - 1-17 | Tuam Stars | Tourlestrane GAA Park |
| | A Brennan 1-1, M Walsh 0-3, E O'Hara 0-1. | | T Carton 1-2, O Hynes 0-4, O Monahan 0-4, K Reidy 0-3, Jarlath Fallon 0-2, John Fallon 0-1, D Kelly 0-1. |

=== Final ===
| 4 December 1994 Final | Aughawillan | 1-08 - 2-09 | Tuam Stars | Páirc Achadh Mhaoileann |
| | D Darcy 0-4, Pat Prior 1-0, P Flanagan 0-3, F Smith 0-1. | | O Hynes 1-2, P O'Dea 1-1, Jarlath Fallon 0-3, K Reidy 0-2, C McGinn 0-1. |

== Leinster ==
=== First round ===
| 22 October 1994 First round | Baltinglass | 2-11 - 0-10 | Longford Slashers | Aughrim County Ground |
| | R McHugh 1-5, K O'Brien 1-2, D McMahon 0-2, D Whaln 0-1, P Kenny 0-1. | | D Sweeney 0-4, D Barry 0-3, J O'Neill 0-1, J O'Reilly 0-1, N Cashin 0-1. |

| 22 October 1994 First round | Sarsfields | 1-10 - 1-10 | Éire Óg | St Conleth's Park |
| | K Horgan 1-1, N Buckley 0-4, T Brennan 0-2, B Nolan 0-2, L Brennan 0-1. | | A Keating 0-7, W Quinlan 1-0, J Hayden 0-2, G Ware 0-1. |

| 22 October 1994 First round | Mullingar Shamrocks | 1-04 - 1-09 | Ferbane | Castletown Sportsfield |
| | C Ryan 1-1, M Reilly 0-2, P Aherne 0-1. | | M Keenaghan 0-4, C McTage 1-0, B Lowry 0-2, B Claffey 0-1, B Flynn 0-1, P Doyle 0-1. |

| 22 October 1994 First round | Dicksboro | 1-07 - 0-10 | St Joseph's | Nowlan Park |
| | S Kennedy 1-2, S Morrissey 0-3, S Walton 0-2. | | Mark O'Brien 0-5, J Lacey 0-3, PJ Dempsey 0-1, Michael O'Brien 0-1. |

| 29 October 1994 First round replay | Éire Óg | 0-09 - 0-12 | Sarsfields | Dr Cullen Park |
| | G Ware 0-2, J Hayden 0-2, A Keating 0-2, J Morrissey 0-2, C Hayden 0-1. | | N Buckley 0-7, T Brennan 0-2, S Sullivan 0-1, J Whelan 0-1, K Horgan 0-1. |

| 29 October 1994 First round | St Joseph's | 3-13 - 1-06 | Dicksboro | O'Moore Park |

=== Quarter-finals ===
| 5 November 1994 Quarter-final | Ferbane | 1-11 - 1-05 | Kilanerin–Ballyfad | O'Connor Park |
| | B Lowry 1-3, B Flynn 0-3, C McTage 0-2, S Grennan 0-1, B Claffey 0-1, M Keenaghan 0-1. | | N Darcy 1-0, J Hegarty 0-2, S Hughes 0-1, M Darcy 0-1, P Bushe 0-1. |

| 6 November 1994 Quarter-final | Sarsfields | 0-08 - 0-13 | Seneschalstown | St Conleth's Park |
| | N Buckley 0-6, K Horgan 0-2. | | P Coyle 0-7, M McCabe 0-4, S Dillon 0-1, T McDonnell 0-1. |

| 6 November 1994 Quarter-final | St Joseph's | 1-11 - 1-09 | Stabannon Parnells | O'Moore Park |
| | Mark O'Brien 0-5, S Murphy 1-0, Michael O'Brien 0-2, D Cooney 0-1, D Crosbie 0-1, A Lacey 0-1, J Lacey 0-1. | | P Butterly 1-6, N McMahon 0-1, J Donaldson 0-1, N Butterly 0-1. |

| 6 November 1994 Quarter-final | Baltinglass | 0-11 - 0-12 | Kilmacud Crokes | Aughrim County Ground |
| | R McHugh 0-5, K O'Brien 0-3, J O'Keeffe 0-2, D Whelan 0-1. | | P Walsh 0-3, Mick Leahy 0-3, M Dillon 0-2, P Dalton 0-2, P Ward 0-2. |

=== Semi-finals ===
| 20 November 1994 Semi-final | Kilmacud Crokes | 4-13 - 1-06 | Ferbane | O'Moore Park |
| | P Ward 2-0, C Mitchell 1-1, M Pender 1-0, Mick Leahy 0-3, P Walsh 0-3, P Dalton 0-2, M Dillon 0-2, N Clancy 0-1, S Morris 0-1. | | B Keenan 1-0, B Lowry 0-1, D Kelly 0-1, B Flynn 0-1, C McTague 0-1, M Keenaghan 0-1, B Claffey 0-1. |

| 20 November 1994 Semi-final | Seneschalstown | 1-11 - 1-11 | St Joseph's | St Conleth's Park |
| | P Coyle 1-3, M McCabe 0-4, A Finnegan 0-2, T McDonnell 0-1, S Dillon 0-1. | | Mark O'Brien 0-5, S Murphy 1-1, PJ Dempsey 0-2, D Crosbie 0-2, Michael O'Brien 0-1. |

| 26 November 1994 Semi-final replay | Seneschalstown | 1-11 - 1-03 | St Joseph's | St Conleth's Park |
| | P Coyle 1-3, A Finnegan 0-4, M McCabe 0-2, S Dillon 0-1, M Hickey 0-1. | | D Cooney 1-0, Mark O'Brien 0-2, D Crosby 0-1. |

=== Final ===
| 4 December 1994 Final | Kilmacud Crokes | 0-12 - 1-08 | Seneschalstown | St Conleth's Park |
| | P Walsh 0-3, D Dalton 0-3, J Sweeney 0-1, P Burke 0-1, Mick Leahy 0-1, S Morris 0-1, P Ward 0-1, C Mitchell 0-1. | | M McCabe 0-4, P Coyle 0-4, T McDonnell 1-0. |

== Munster ==
=== First round ===
| 23 October 1994 First round | Castlehaven | 3-11 - 3-05 | The Nire | Castlehaven Sportsfield |
| | E Cleary 2-3, F Cahalane 1-2, M O'Mahony 0-2, D O'Sullivan 0-1, L Tomkins 0-1, P Cahalane 0-1, N Cahalane 0-1. | | K Mulcahy 1-2, P Walsh 1-0, J Hogan 1-0, M Guiry 0-3. |

| 30 October 1994 First round | Clonmel Commercials | 3-17 - 1-09 | Galbally | Clonmel Sportsground |
| | F Kelly 2-6, C McGrath 1-0, D O'Shea 0-3, P O'Keeffe 0-3, A Wall 0-2, L Phelan 0-1, F O'Callaghan 0-1, D Hickey 0-1. | | F Finnan 1-0, D O'Farrell 0-3, J Cummins 0-3, T Cummins 0-2, P Ryan 0-1. |

=== Semi-finals ===
| 6 November 1994 Semi-final | Austin Stacks | 1-10 - 2-09 | Clonmel Commercials | Austin Stack Park |
| | D Ahern 0-5, G Lynch 1-0, O Moynihan 0-3, J Barry 0-1, D Sayers 0-1. | | E Hewitt 1-2, F Kelly 0-4, C McGrath 1-0, F O'Callaghan 0-2, A Wall 0-1. |

| 6 November 1994 Semi-final | Kilrush Shamrocks | 1-03 - 1-06 | Castlehaven | The Cricket Field |
| | J Meaney 1-0, A Daly 0-2, G Griffin 0-1. | | L Tompkins 1-2, E Cleary 0-3, J Maguire 0-1. |

=== Final ===
| 20 November 1994 Final | Castlehaven | 2-14 - 1-04 | Clonmel Commercials | Páirc Uí Rinn |
| | L Tompkins 1-7, E Cleary 1-2, M O'Mahony 0-2, P Cahalane 0-2, J Maguire 0-1. | | J McNamara 1-0, F Kelly 0-2, A Wall 0-1, F O'Callaghan 0-1. |

== Ulster ==
=== Preliminary round ===
| 2 October 1994 Preliminary round | Aodh Ruadh | 0-15 - 1-10 | Errigal Ciarán | Fr Tierney Park |
| | J Duffy 0-5, V Murray 0-3, D Buggy 0-3, S Maguire 0-2, C O'Donnell 0-1, D Conlon 0-1. | | P Canavan 0-5, E Kavanagh 1-1, D Mallon 0-2, E Gormley 0-2. |

=== Quarter-finals ===
| 2 October 1994 Quarter-final | Gowna | 0-11 - 1-07 | Lisnaskea Emmetts | Breffni Park |
| | S Pearson 0-4, C Madden 0-2, T Hartin 0-1, L Brady 0-1, Declan McCabe 0-1, Dermot McCabe 0-1, F Hartin 0-1. | | C McCreesh 1-0, C Curran 0-3, S King 0-3, Brendan McCreesh 0-1. |

| 2 October 1994 Quarter-final | St Paul's | 1-09 - 2-09 | Clan na Gael | Casement Park |
| | B O'Neill 1-1, P McErlein 0-2, J McManus 0-2, J Kennedy 0-2, R O'Neill 0-1, A Donnelly 0-1. | | B O'Hagan 0-5, B McAreavey 1-0, D McCann 1-0, P Henderson 0-2, J Campbell 0-1, F Curran 0-1. |

| 23 October 1994 Quarter-final | Bellaghy | 0-13 - 1-08 | Aodh Ruadh | Wolfe Tone Park |
| | K Diamond 0-4, D Cassidy 0-4, L McPeake 0-1, J Donnelly 0-1, J Mulholland 0-1, E Cassidy 0-1, G Doherty 0-1. | | V Murray 1-1, D Buggy 0-2, J Duffy 0-2, D Conlon 0-1, M Cullen 0-1, S Maguire 0-1. |

| 6 November 1994 Quarter-final | Castlewellan | 2-10 - 3-09 | Clontibret O'Neills | St Patrick's Park |
| | M McKibbon 1-3, C O'Neill 0-5, A McVeigh 1-0, D Hawkins 0-1, C McCabe 0-1. | | K Lavelle 3-1, K Brennan 0-3, M O'Dowd 0-2, R Mone 0-2, P McShane 0-1. |

=== Semi-finals ===
| 6 November 1994 Semi-final | Bellaghy | 0-11 - 1-07 | Gowna | St Tiernach's Park |
| | K Diamond 0-4, D Cassidy 0-3, D Quinn 0-1, E Cassidy 0-1, B Lee 0-1, L McPeake 0-1. | | D McCabe 0-4, M McCabe 1-0, S Pearson 0-1, B Morris 0-1, D Brady 0-1. |

| 20 November 1994 Semi-final | Clontibret O'Neills | 2-10 - 1-10 | Clan na Gael | Páirc an Iúir |
| | P McShane 0-5, M O'Dowd 1-1, N Magennis 1-0, K Brennan 0-2, C Mone 0-1, R Mone 0-1. | | Diarmuid Marsden 1-2, B O'Hagan 0-5, P Henderson 0-2, J Campbell 0-1. |

=== Final ===
| 11 December 1994 Final | Bellaghy | 0-11 - 0-10 | Clontibret O'Neills | Athletic Grounds |
| | K Diamond 0-4, D Cassidy 0-3, E Cassidy 0-1, B Lee 0-1, L McPeake 0-1, G Doherty 0-1. | | R Moane 0-4, M O'Dowd 0-3, C Brennan 0-1, N McGuinness 0-1, B Morgan 0-1. |

== Quarter-final ==
| 11 December 1994 Quarter-final | Castlehaven | 3-18 - 0-03 | Oisín | Castlehaven Sportsfield |
| | E Cleary 1-6, L Tompkins 0-8, M O'Mahony 1-2, MC O'Mahony 1-0, J Maguire 0-1, D O'Sullivan 0-1. | | J Maxwell 0-1, J Hogan 0-1, P Sweeney 0-1. |

== Semi-finals ==
| 26 February 1995 Semi-final | Kilmacud Crokes | 1-11 - 1-07 | Castlehaven | Semple Stadium |
| | N Clancy 0-7, M Duncan 1-0, M Dillon 0-2, M Leahy 0-1, P Ward 0-1. | | L Tompkins 0-6, E Cleary 1-0, N Cahalane 0-1. |

| 26 February 1995 Semi-final | Bellaghy | 0-13 - 1-06 | Tuam Stars | Brewster Park |
| | K Diamond 0-5, D Cassidy 0-3, B Lee 0-3, L McPeak 0-1, G Doherty 0-1. | | T Carton 1-0, O Hynes 0-2, K Reidy 0-2, J O'Dea 0-1, J Fallon 0-1. |

== Final ==
| 17 March 1995 Final | Kilmacud Crokes | 0-08 - 0-05 | Bellaghy | Croke Park |
| | N Clancy 0-3, P O'Donoghue 0-3, M Dillon 0-1, P Ward 0-1. | | K Diamond 0-2, D Cassidy 0-1, J Mulholland 0-1, D Cassidy 0-1. |

== Statistics ==
=== Miscellaneous ===
- Tuam Stars won the Connacht Club Championship title for the first time in their history.
