= 1924 Cork Intermediate Football Championship =

Gaelic football competition

- Champions: O'Donovan Rossa (1st title)
- Runners-up: Mallow

The 1924 Cork Intermediate Football Championship was the 15th staging of the Cork Intermediate Football Championship since its establishment by the Cork County Board in 1909.

The final was played on 15 March 1925 at the Mardyke in Cork, between O'Donovan Rossa and Mallow, in what was their first ever meeting in the final. O'Donovan Rossa won the match by 1–04 to 0–00 to claim their first ever championship title.

== Results ==
=== Final ===
| 15 March 1925 Final | O'Donovan Rossa | 1-04 - 0-00 | Mallow | The Mardyke |
