= 1989 Cork Senior Football Championship =

Gaelic football competition

- Dates: 16 April 1989 – 29 October 1989
- Teams: 20
- Champions: Castlehaven (1st title); Larry Tompkins (captain); Pádraig Burke (manager)
- Runners-up: St. Finbarr's; Tony Leahy (captain); Donal Murray (manager)

Tournament statistics
- Matches played: 22
- Goals scored: 40 (1.82 per match)
- Points scored: 401 (18.23 per match)
- Top scorer(s): Eoin O'Mahony (2-14)

The 1989 Cork Senior Football Championship was the 101st staging of the Cork Senior Football Championship since its establishment by the Cork County Board in 1887. The draw for the opening round fixtures took place on 18 December 1988. The championship began on 16 April 1989 and ended on 29 October 1989.

Nemo Rangers entered the championship as the defending champions, however, they were defeated by St. Finbarr's in a semi-final replay.

On 29 October 1989, Castlehaven won the championship following a 0-09 to 0-07 defeat of St. Finbarr's in the final. This was their first championship title.

Eoin O'Mahony from the Nemo Rangers club was the championship's top scorer with 2-14.

== Team changes ==
=== To Championship ===
Promoted from the Cork Intermediate Football Championship

- Kilshannig

=== From Championship ===
Regraded to the Cork Intermediate Football Championship

- Castletownbere
- Midleton
- Millstreet

== Results ==
=== First round ===
24 April 1989 First round	Carrigdhoun	0-10 - 0-13	St. Nicholas'	Manning Park, Passage
				Referee: S Crean (Bandon)

30 April 1989 First round	Seandún	2-04 - 1-13	Glanmire	Páirc Uí Chaoimh, Cork
	D O'Mahony 1-1, A Cotter 1-0, B Harrington 0-1, J Horgan 0-1, K O'Neill 0-1.		T Murphy 0-5, P O'Callaghan 1-1, N Mulvihill 0-3, T McCarthy 0-3, D Kenneally 0-1.	Referee: D Casey (Ballyclough)

30 April 1989 First round	Bishopstown	0-07 - 1-07	Beara	Sam Maguire Park, Dunmanway
	P McGrath 0-4, M Burke 0-1, G McCarthy 0-1, E Lyons 0-1.		C O'Sullivan 0-4, Michael O'Sullivan 1-0, Noel Murphy 0-2, P Healy 0-1.	Referee: P O'Donovan (Bantry Blues)

10 June 1989 First round	O'Donovan Rossa	1-11 - 1-11	Na Piarsaigh	Charlie Hurley Park, Bandon
	M McCarthy 0-8, D O'Donovan 1-0, C O'Regan 0-1, P Davis 0-1, A Byrne 0-1.		C Connery 1-2, M Mullins 0-3, J O'Connor 0-2, C O'Donovan 0-1, T O'Sullivan 0-1, J O'Sullivan 0-1, C Coughlan 0-1.	Referee: F Murphy

1 July 1989 First round replay	O'Donovan Rossa	2-06 - 0-14	Na Piarsaigh	Charlie Hurley Park, Bandon
	M McCarthy 0-5, D O'Donovan 1-1, I Breen 1-0.		M Mullins 0-8, Don Sheehan 0-2, C Connery 0-1, T O'Sullivan 0-1, L Forde 0-1, J O'Connor 0-1.	Referee: F Murphy

=== Second round ===
16 April 1989 Second round	Imokilly	0-06 - 2-02	Avondhu	Moore Park, Kilworth
	D Walsh 0-2, M Spillane 0-1, G Morgan 0-1, J Corcoran 0-1, C O'Neill 0-1.		T Kelleher 1-1, M O'Shea 1-1.	Referee: J O'Leary (Na Piarsaigh)

7 May 1989 Second round	University College Cork	2-11 - 1-08	Clonakilty	Charlie Hurley Park, Bandon
	O Moynihan 1-2, M Fitzgerald 0-4, J Kissane 1-0, A O'Shea 0-2, M Finnegan 0-1, P Creedon 0-1, G O'Leary 0-1.		H Moynihan 0-4, M de Long 1-0, E Ryan 0-3, A Bluett 0-1.	Referee: D Collins (Kinsale)

7 May 1989 Second round	Kilshannig	0-10 - 0-10	Carbery	Cloughduv
	M O'Sullivan 0-2, W O'Riordan 0-2, P O'Connell 0-1, D O'Connell 0-1, G Creedon 0-1, M Murphy 0-1, P O'Regan 0-1, M Geaney 0-1.		S Dineen 0-3, B Harte 0-2, N Crowley 0-2, K Santry 0-1, M O'Donoghue 0-1, T Buckley 0-1.	Referee: M Keane (Cloughduv)

28 May 1989 Second round	Muskerry	3-07 - 0-05	St Michael's	Ovens
	N Twomey 1-1, D Lynch 1-1, G Ring 1-1, G McPolin 0-2, C O'Connell 0-1, J O'Connor 0-1.		A Ryan 0-3, I Ahern 0-1, P Fitzgerald 0-1.	Referee: P O'Donovan (Bantry Blues)

10 June 1989 Second round	Glanmire	1-08 - 2-12	Duhallow	O'Connell Park, Glantane
	S McElhinney 1-1, T McCarthy 0-3, V Barry 0-1, T Murphy 0-1, R Lotty 0-1, L Hedderman 0-1.		D Culloty 1-1, J Dennehy 1-1, A Barry 0-4, N O'Connor 0-2, D O'Connor 0-2, L Dennehy 0-1, J Casey 0-1.	Referee: D Casey (Ballyclough)

10 June 1989 Second round	St. Nicholas'	1-09 - 0-13	Castlehaven	Henry Ford Park, Ballinascarthy
	J McCarthy 1-1, P Long 0-4, V Hedderman 0-3, K O'Shea 0-1.		L Tompkins 0-4, M O'Mahony 0-2, M O'Brien 0-2, J Cleary 0-2, E Cleary 0-1, D O'Regan 0-1, F Collins 0-1.	Referee: D Collins (Kinsale)

11 June 1989 Second round replay	Kilshannig	1-07 - 2-09	Carbery	Cloughduv
	P O'Connell 1-2, W O'Leary 0-4, B O'Sullivan 0-1.		J Caulfied 1-3, S Mohan 1-1, K Santry 0-3, M O'Donoghue 0-2.	Referee: J O'Leary (Na Piarsaigh)

11 June 1989 Second round	Beara	1-05 - 1-10	St. Finbarr's	Rossa Park, Skibbereen
	J Power 1-0, C O'Sullivan 0-3, P Healy 0-1, C Collins 0-1.		J Griffin 1-1, C Ryan 0-2, S Bergin 0-2, D Barry 0-2, K McCarthy 0-1, E Barrett 0-1, T Leahy 0-1.	Referee: N Hallihan (Bandon)

8 July 1989 Second round	Na Piarsaigh	1-06 - 1-11	Nemo Rangers	Church Road, Blackrock
	D Sheehan 1-1, M Mullins 0-2, C O'Donovan 0-1, C Coughlan 0-1, R McDonnell 0-1.		S O'Brien 1-1, E O'Mahony 0-4, D Allen 0-2, S Calnan 0-1, T Dalton 0-1, M Dorgan 0-1, T Nation 0-1.	Referee: P Cronin (Bantry Blues)

=== Quarter-finals ===
8 July 1989 Quarter-final	Castlehaven	1-15 - 0-10	Carbery	Wolfe Tone Park, Bantry
	L Tompkins 0-7, M O'Mahony 1-1, J Cleary 0-3, J Nolan 0-1, TG Regan 0-1, P Cahalane 0-1, M O'Brien 0-1.		B Harte 0-8, M O'Donoghue 0-1, S Mohan 0-1.	Referee: E Porter (Brian Dillons)

9 July 1989 Quarter-final	Duhallow	1-12 - 0-12	Muskerry	Knocknagree
	N O'Connor 0-5, J Dennehy 1-1, A Barry 0-4, L Dennehy 0-1, P O'Connor 0-1.		C O'Callaghan 0-4, C O'Connell 0-3, J O'Driscoll 0-3, N Twomey 0-1, D McCarthy 0-1.	Referee: D Casey (Ballyclough)

26 July 1989 Quarter-final	St. Finbarr's	1-14 - 0-10	University College Cork	Páirc Uí Chaoimh, Cork
	D Barry 0-7, M Barry 1-1, J Keating 0-2, J Griffin 0-2, K McCarthy 0-1, T Power 0-1.		M Fitzgerald 0-4, C Collins 0-2, A O'Shea 0-2, P Creedon 0-1, G O'Leary 0-1.	Referee: E Porter (Brian Dillons)

20 July 1989 Quarter-final	Nemo Rangers	2-17 - 1-05	Avondhu	Castlelyons
	E O'Mahony 1-6, S O'Brien 1-1, T Nation 0-3, M Dorgan 0-2, J Kerrigan 0-1, S Calnan 0-1, E Fitzgerald 0-1, D O'Sullivan 0-1, C Corkery 0-1.		M Dolan 1-0, C O'Sullivan 0-2, P Harrington 0-1, J Donegan 0-1, G O'Sullivan 0-1.	Referee: N Barrett

=== Semi-finals ===
15 October 1989 Semi-final	Castlehaven	1-10 - 1-05	Duhallow	Páirc Uí Chaoimh, Cork
	M O'Mahony 1-2, J Cleary 0-3, L Tompkins 0-2, D O'Regan 0-1, M O'Brien 0-1, F Collins 0-1.		L Dennehy 1-0, N O'Connor 0-3, D O'Connor 0-1, E Grimes 0-1.	Referee: E Porter (Brian Dillons)

15 October 1989 Semi-final	St. Finbarr's	0-09 - 1-06	Nemo Rangers	Páirc Uí Chaoimh, Cork
	D Barry 0-7, M Barry 0-1, K McCarthy 0-1.		S O'Brien 1-0, E O'Mahony 0-2, S Calnan 0-2, S Fahy 0-1, T Nation 0-1.	Referee: P O'Donovan (Bantry Blues)

21 October 1989 Semi-final replay	St. Finbarr's	2-08 - 2-07	Nemo Rangers	Páirc Uí Chaoimh, Cork
	M Barry 1-1, T Griffin 0-4, T Leahy 1-0, J Allen 0-1, K McCarthy 0-1, D Barry 0-1.		E O'Mahony 1-2, S Calnan 1-1, D Allen 0-2, E Fitzgerald 0-1, T Dalton 0-1.	Referee: P O'Donovan (Bantry Blues)

=== Final ===
29 October 1989 Final	Castlehaven	0-09 - 0-07	St. Finbarr's	Páirc Uí Chaoimh, Cork
	L Tompkins 0-5, F Collins 0-1, MC O'Mahony 0-1, M O'Brien 0-1, D O'Regan 0-1.		J Griffin 0-4, J Allen 0-1, T Leahy 0-1, M Sclocum 0-1.	Referee: E Porter (Brian Dillons)

== Championship statistics ==
=== Top scorers ===
Top scorers overall

Rank	Player	Club	Tally	Total	Matches	Average
1	Eoin O'Mahony	Nemo Rangers	2-14	20	4	5.00
2	Larry Tompkins	Castlehaven	0-18	18	4	4.50
3	Dave Barry	St. Finbarr's	0-17	17	5	3.40
4	John Griffin	St. Finbarr's	1-11	14	5	2.80
5	Mick McCarthy	O'Donovan Rossa	0-13	13	2	6.50
5	Mick Mullins	Na Piarsaigh	0-13	13	3	4.66
7	Michael O'Mahony	Castlehaven	2-06	12	4	3.00
8	Steven O'Brien	Nemo Rangers	3-02	11	4	2.75
9	Barry Harte	Carbery	0-10	10	2	5.00
10	Michael Barry	St. Finbarr's	2-03	9	5	1.80

Top scorers in a single game

Rank	Player	Club	Tally	Total	Opposition
1	Eoin O'Mahony	Nemo Rangers	1-06	9	Avondhu
2	Mick McCarthy	O'Donovan Rossa	0-08	8	Na Piarsaigh
2	Mick Mullins	Na Piarsaigh	0-08	8	O'Donovan Rossa
2	Barry Harte	Carbery	0-08	8	Castlehaven
5	Larry Tompkins	Castlehaven	0-07	7	Carbery
5	Dave Barry	St. Finbarr's	0-07	7	UCC
5	Dave Barry	St. Finbarr's	0-07	7	Nemo Rangers
8	John Caulfield	Carbery	1-03	6	Kilshannig

=== Miscellaneous ===
- Castlehaven win their first senior title.
