= Castlehaven GAA =

GAA club in Cork, Ireland

Castlehaven
- Gleann Bhearracháin
- Founded: 1922
- County: Cork
- Nickname: The Haven
- Colours
- Grounds: Páirc Gleann Bhearracháin
- Coordinates: 51°32′26.05″N 9°12′58.78″W

Playing kits
Standard colours

Senior Club Championships
	All Ireland	Munster champions	Cork champions
Football:	0	4	7

Castlehaven Gaelic Football Club is a Gaelic Athletic Association club in Castlehaven, County Cork, Ireland. The club is affiliated to the Carbery Board and is solely concerned with the game of Gaelic football.

== History ==
Located in the parish of Castlehaven, about 5km from Skibbereen, Castlehaven Gaelic Football Club was established in 1922. The club also draws players from the villages of Union Hall, Castletownshend and Tragumna. Castlehaven spent its first 50 years operating in the junior ranks, however, a West Cork JBFC title in 1969 began a remarkable decade of success for the club. This was followed by two West Cork JAFC titles, with the second of these being converted into a Cork JAFC title in 1976. Castlehaven secured senior status for the first time in their history when, in 1978, they claimed the Cork IFC title after a defeat of St Finbarr's.

A decade after joining the top tier, Castlehaven won their maiden Cork SFC title after a two-point defeat of St Finbarr's in the final. The club later claimed their first Munster Club SFC title after a defeat of St Senan's, Kilkee. Castlehaven won a second Cork SFC title, after a defeat of local rivals O'Donovan Rossa in 1994, while the also claimed further Munster Club SFC honours in 1994 and 1997.

The new century brought further a third Cork SFC title success in 2003. This was followed by back-to-back successes in 2012 and 2013, and again in 2023 and 2024. Castlehaven claimed their fourth Munster Club SFC title after a penalty shootout defeat of Dingle in 2023.

== Honours ==
- Munster Senior Club Football Championship (4): 1989, 1994, 1997, 2023
- Cork Premier Senior Football Championship (7): 1989, 1994, 2003, 2012, 2013, 2023, 2024
- Kelleher Shield (Cork Senior Football League) (3): 1993, 1998, 2007
- Cork Intermediate Football Championship (1): 1978
- Cork Junior A Football Championship (1): 1976
- West Cork Junior A Football Championship (2): 1973, 1976
- West Cork Junior B Football Championship (2): 1944, 1969
- West Cork Junior B Hurling Championship (2): 1973, 1980
- West Cork Junior C Football Championship (1): 2003
- Cork Under-21 Football Championship (5): 1981, 1983, 1998, 2007, 2010
- West Cork Under-21 A Football Championship (7): 1980, 1981, 1982, 1983, 1998, 2007, 2010
- West Cork Under-21 B Hurling Championship (1): 1981
- Cork Minor A Football Championship (2): 2013, 2023
- West Cork Minor A Football Championship (4): 2001, 2004, 2013 2023
- West Cork Minor B Football Championship (6): 1971, 1977, 1978, 1980, 1982, 1986
- West Cork Minor C Football Championship (1): 2012

== Notable players ==
- Michael Burns: All-Ireland SFC-winner (1989)
- Niall Cahalane: All-Ireland SFC-winner (1989, 1990)
- John Cleary: All-Ireland SFC-winner (1989, 1990)
- Michael Maguire: All-Ireland SFC-winner (1989, 1990)
- Larry Tompkins: All-Ireland SFC-winner (1989, 1990)
