= O'Donovan Rossa GAA (Cork) =

Gaelic games club in County Cork, Ireland

O'Donovan Rossa
- Ó Donnabháin Rossa
- Founded: 1887
- County: Cork
- Nickname: Rossas
- Colours
- Grounds: O'Donovan Rossa Park
- Coordinates: 51°33′15.33″N 9°16′16.07″W

Playing kits
Standard colours

Senior Club Championships
	All Ireland	Munster champions	Cork champions
Football:	1	1	1

O'Donovan Rossa GAA Club is a Gaelic Athletic Association club in Skibbereen, County Cork, Ireland. The club is affiliated to the Carbery Board and fields teams in both hurling and Gaelic football.

== History ==
Located in the town of Skibbereen, about 80km from Cork, Skibbereen GAA Club was founded on 8 November 1887. The club was later renamed in honour of Fenian leader Jeremiah O'Donovan Rossa. It was 1924 before the club had their first major success by winning the Cork IFC after a defeat of Mallow in the final.

O'Donovan Rossa spent the majority of the following decades operating in the junior grades in both codes. The club won three successive South West JHC titles in the 1930s, while six South West JFC titles were claimed between 1945 and 1982. O'Donovan Rossa secured senior status after claiming their second Cork IFC title in 1985.

Arguably, the 1992–93 season remains the most successful ever in the history of the club. O'Donovan Rossa won their sole Cork SFC title that season, following a 2–09 to 0–10 win over Nemo Rangers in the final. This was later converted into a Munster Club SFC title. On 28 March 1993, O'Donovan Rossa beat Éire Óg by 1–07 to 0–08 in the All-Ireland Club SFC final replay.

== Honours ==
- All-Ireland Senior Club Football Championship (1): 1993
- Munster Senior Club Football Championship (1): 1992
- Cork Senior Football Championship (1): 1992
- Cork Intermediate Football Championship (2): 1924, 1985
- West Cork Junior A Football Championship (6): 1945, 1961, 1963, 1974, 1979, 1982
- West Cork Junior A Hurling Championship (3): 1931, 1932, 1933
- Cork Junior B Hurling Championship (2): 2004, 2013
- West Cork Junior B Hurling Championship (6): 1955, 1960, 1983, 1995, 2004, 2013
- West Cork Junior B Football Championship (2): 1955, 1963
- West Cork Junior C Football Championship (1): 1980
- Cork Minor Football Championship (1): 2001
- Cork Minor A Football Championship (1): 2008
- West Cork Minor A Football Championship (13): 1943, 1949, 1950, 1958, 1963, 1981, 1982, 1983, 1985, 1986, 1987, 1988, 2008
- West Cork Minor B Hurling Championship (1): 1983

== Notable players ==
- Tony Davis: All-Ireland SFC–winner (1989, 1990)
- Mick McCarthy: All-Ireland SFC–winner (1989, 1990)
