= 1985 All-Ireland Senior Football Championship final =

- Event: 1985 All-Ireland Senior Football Championship
Kerry	Dublin
2–12 (18)	2–8 (14)
- Date: 22 September 1985
- Venue: Croke Park, Dublin
- Referee: Paddy Kavanagh (Meath)
- Attendance: 69,389

The 1985 All-Ireland Senior Football Championship final was the 98th All-Ireland Final and the deciding match of the 1985 All-Ireland Senior Football Championship, an inter-county Gaelic football tournament for the top teams in Ireland.

The final was contested by Dublin and Kerry. This was one of six All-Ireland SFC finals contested by both Dublin and Kerry between 1974 and 1986, a period when one of either team always contested the decider. The teams would not meet in an All-Ireland SFC final again until 2011.

== Pre-match ==
On the morning of the game, Kerry manager Mick O'Dwyer and his players featured in an advertisement for Bendix washing machines, with the line "Only Bendix could whitewash this lot".

== Match ==
This year's final was played on 22 September.

=== Summary ===
Kerry led by nine points at half-time, and two Joe McNally goals in the second half was not enough to stop them.

Jack O'Shea picked the ball up with wonderful skill in front of referee Paddy Kavanagh, who proceeded to marvel at the Kerryman's abilities.

It was the fourth of five All-Ireland SFC titles won by Kerry in the 1980s.

=== Details ===
22 September 1985
Final

Kerry	2–12 – 2–8	Dublin
J O'Shea 1–3, T O'Dowd 1–1, M Sheehy 0–3, T Doyle 0–1, J Kennedy 0–1, P Spillane 0–2 D Moran 0–1		J McNally 2–0, B Rock 0–3, T Conroy 0–2, J Kearns 0–2, T Carr 0–1

Croke Park, Dublin
Attendance: 69,289
Referee: P Kavanagh (Meath)

Kerry
Dublin

==== Kerry ====
- 1 C. Nelligan
- 2 P. Ó Sé (c)
- 3 S. Walsh
- 4 M. Spillane
- 5 T. Doyle
- 6 T. Spillane
- 7 G. Lynch
- 8 J. O'Shea
- 9 A. O'Donovan
- 10 T. O'Dowd
- 11 D. Moran
- 12 P. Spillane
- 13 M. Sheehy
- 14 E. Liston
- 15 G. Power

Sub used
17 J. Kennedy for G. Power

Subs not used
16 J. Higgins
18 G. O'Sullivan
19 J. Mulvihill
20 S. Liston
21 D. Hanafin
22 D. O'Donoghue
23 J. Keane
24 L. Kearns

Manager
M. O'Dwyer

==== Dublin ====
- 1 J. O'Leary
- 2 M. Kennedy
- 3 G. Hargan
- 4 R. Hazley
- 5 P. Canavan
- 6 N. McCaffrey
- 7 D. Synnott
- 8 J. Ronayne
- 9 B. Mullins (c)
- 10 B. Rock
- 11 T. Conroy
- 12 C. Redmond
- 13 J. Kearns
- 14 J. McNally
- 15 K. Duff

Subs used
20 T. Carr for C. Redmond
17 P. J. Buckley for B. Mullins

Manager
K. Heffernan
