= List of Dublin inter-county footballers =

This is a very incomplete list of Gaelic footballers who have played at senior level for the Dublin county team.

== List of players ==
=== A ===
- Paddy Andrews: 12 years, until 2021
- Peadar Andrews

=== B ===
- Keith Barr
- Denis Bastick: Until 2017, championship debut in 2009
- Paul Bealin
- Kevin Bonner
- Ger Brennan
- Alan Brogan
- Bernard Brogan Jnr: Until 2019, championship debut in 2007, 116 league and championship appearances, scoring 36 goals and 344 points (452)
- Bernard Brogan Snr
- Jim Brogan
- Paul Brogan
- PJ Buckley

=== C ===
- John Caffrey
- Barry Cahill
- Paul Casey
- Tommy Carr
- Shane Carthy
- Paddy Christie
- Jonny Cooper
- Ray Cosgrove
- Paul Clarke
- Stephen Cluxton
- Diarmuid Connolly: Until 2020
- Bryan Cullen
- Paddy Cullen
- Paul Curran

=== D ===
- Darren Daly: 12 years, until 2020
- Declan Darcy
- Mick Deegan
- Sean Doherty
- Bobby Doyle
- Tommy Drumm
- Kieran Duff

=== F ===
- Dessie Farrell
- Brian Fenton
- Des Ferguson
- Paul Flynn: Until 2019
- Ollie Freaney

=== G ===
- Mick Galvin
- Jim Gavin
- Pat Gilroy
- Coman Goggins: Until 2008, championship debut in 2000
- Paul Griffin

=== H ===
- Tony Hanahoe
- Gerry Hargan
- Ray Hazley
- Kevin Heffernan
- David Henry
- David Hickey
- Mick Holden
- Darren Homan
- Brian Howard

=== K ===
- Conal Keaney
- Jimmy Keaveney
- Robbie Kelleher
- Ciarán Kilkenny

=== L ===
- Alan Larkin

=== M ===
- Johnny Magee
- Paul Mannion
- Michael Darragh MacAuley
- Jack McCaffrey
- Noel McCaffrey
- James McCarthy
- John McCarthy
- Philly McMahon: Until 2021, championship debut in 2008
- Kevin McManamon: 2010-2021
- Joe McNally
- Colin Moran
- Kevin Moran
- Brian Mullins
- Eoin Murchan
- Vinnie Murphy

=== N ===
- Kevin Nolan

=== O ===
- Con O'Callaghan
- Rory O'Carroll
- Gay O'Driscoll
- Eoghan O'Gara: Until 2019, debut in 2008 National League
- John O'Leary
- Pat O'Neill
- Cian O'Sullivan: Until 2021
- Anton O'Toole

=== Q ===
- Paddy Quinn, played several times in the 2013 National Football League
- Tomás Quinn

=== R ===
- Charlie Redmond
- Barney Rock
- Dean Rock
- Shane Ryan
- Fran Ryder

=== S ===
- Jack Sheedy
- Jason Sherlock

=== W ===
- Ciarán Whelan: 1996–2009, debut v Meath in 1996 Leinster final
