= 1987 International Rules Series =

The 1987 International Rules Series was the third series between Gaelic footballers from Ireland and Australian rules footballers from Australia. The series took place in Ireland and consisted of three test matches between the Australian and Irish international rules football teams. Australia won the series 2–1 and by 27 over the three test matches.

Eugene McGee was in charge of the Irish team, while Seán McCague was his assistant manager.

== Summary ==
First test
Venue: Croke Park, Dublin
Crowd: 15,532

Team	Score
(Republic of Ireland) Ireland	3-7-14 (53)
Australia	1-11-12 (51)

Ireland	Australia
Greg Blaney; Val Daly; Kieran Duff; Paul Earley; Mick Fagan; Liam Hayes; Ger Lynch; Mick Lyons; Brian McGilligan; Seamus McHugh; Dermot McNicholl; Ciarán Murray; Pat O'Byrne; John O'Leary; Robbie O'Malley; Jim Reilly; Noel Roche; B. Sex; Pat Spillane; Tom Spillane	Bruce Abernethy; Andrew Bews; Peter Bubner; Matthew Campbell; Peter Foster; Danny Frawley; Andrew Jarman; Chris Lewis; Bruce Lindner; Bruce Lindsay; Steve Malaxos; Tony McGuinness; Michael Mitchell; Richard Osborne; Gary Pert; Paul Roos; Brian Royal; Scott Salisbury; Jim Stynes; Phil Walsh

Second test
Venue: Croke Park, Dublin
Crowd: 15,485

Team	Score
(Republic of Ireland) Ireland	3-6-11 (47)
Australia	3-14-12 (72)

Ireland	Australia
Niall Cahalane; Val Daly; Kieran Duff; Mick Fagan; Gerry Hargan; Liam Hayes; Ger Lynch; John Lynch; Mick Lyons; Brian McGilligan; Seamus McHugh; Dermot McNicholl; Ciarán Murray; Pat O'Byrne; John O'Leary; Robbie O'Malley; Jim Reilly; Noel Roche; Pat Spillane; Tom Spillane	Bruce Abernethy; Andrew Bews; Matthew Campbell; Peter Foster; Danny Frawley; Ross Gibbs; Darel Hart; Andrew Jarman; Chris Lewis; Bruce Lindsay; Steve Malaxos; Tony McGuinness; Michael Mitchell; Richard Osborne; Gary Pert; Paul Roos; Brian Royal; Scott Salisbury; Jim Stynes; Stephen Wright

Third test
Venue: Croke Park, Dublin
Crowd: 27,023

Team	Score
(Republic of Ireland) Ireland	1-13-10 (55)
Australia	0-14-17 (59)

Ireland	Australia
Greg Blaney; Colm Browne; Niall Cahalane; Mick Fagan; Bernard Flynn; Stephen King; Ger Lynch; Mick Lyons; Brian McGilligan; Seamus McHugh; Dermot McNicholl; Ciarán Murray; John O'Leary; Robbie O'Malley; Jim Reilly; Noel Roche; Tony Scullion; B. Sex; Pat Spillane; Tom Spillane	Bruce Abernethy; Andrew Bews; Matthew Campbell; Danny Frawley; Darel Hart; Andrew Jarman; Chris Lewis; Bruce Lindsay; Steve Malaxos; Tony McGuinness; Michael Mitchell; Richard Osborne; David Pearce; Gary Pert; Paul Roos; Brian Royal; Scott Salisbury; Jim Stynes; Stephen Wright; Phil Walsh

Beitzel Medal (Best player for the series) — Tony McGuinness (Australia)
