= 1986 International Rules Series =

The 1986 International Rules Series was the second series between Australian rules footballers from Australia and Gaelic footballers from Ireland. The series took place in Australia and consisted of three test matches between the Australian and Irish international rules football teams. Ireland won the series 2–1 and by 32 points over the three test matches.

== Summary ==
First Test
Venue: WACA Ground, Perth

Date: 11 October 1986

Crowd: 25,000

Team	Score
Australia	1-14-16 (64)
(Republic of Ireland) Ireland	5-5-12 (57)

Australia	Ireland
Greg Anderson; Mark Bairstow; Terry Daniher; Robert DiPierdomenico; Gerard Healy; Craig Holden; Wayne Johnston; Chris Langford; Tony McGuinness; Garry McIntosh; Mark Naley; Gary Pert; John Platten; Mike Richardson; Maurice Rioli; Paul Roos; Kevin Walsh; Dale Weightman; Peter Wilson	Greg Blaney; Niall Cahalane; Val Daly; Mick Fagan; Gerry Hargan; Mick Holden; Jimmy Kerrigan; Mick Lyons; Joe McNally; Dermot McNicholl; Brian McGilligan; Ciarán Murray; Pat O'Byrne; John O'Driscoll; John O'Leary; Colm O'Rourke; Jack O'Shea; Pat Spillane; Tom Spillane

Second Test
Venue: VFL Park, Melbourne

Date: 19 October 1986

Crowd: 10,883

Team	Score
Australia	1-10-10 (46)
(Republic of Ireland) Ireland	3-10-14 (62)

Australia	Ireland
Greg Anderson; David Bolton; Dermott Brereton; Gary Buckenara; Peter Curran; Terry Daniher; Robert DiPierdomenico; Brad Hardie; Gerard Healy; Craig Holden; Wayne Johnston; Chris Langford; Mark Naley; John Platten; Mike Richardson; Maurice Rioli; Paul Roos; Dale Weightman; Peter Wilson	Greg Blaney; Niall Cahalane; Val Daly; Mick Fagan; Gerry Hargan; Jimmy Kerrigan; Mick Lyons; Seamus McHugh; Joe McNally; Dermot McNicholl; Brian McGilligan; Ciarán Murray; Pat O'Byrne; John O'Driscoll; Damien O'Hagan; John O'Leary; Jack O'Shea; Noel Roche; Tom Spillane

Third Test
Venue: Football Park, Adelaide

Date: 24 October 1986

Crowd: 10,000 approx

Team	Score
Australia	0-7-11 (32)
(Republic of Ireland) Ireland	4-8-7 (55)

Australia	Ireland
Greg Anderson; David Bolton; Dermott Brereton; Gary Buckenara; Terry Daniher; Robert DiPierdomenico; Gerard Healy; Craig Holden; Wayne Johnston; Chris Langford; Tony McGuinness; Garry McIntosh; Gary Pert; John Platten; Maurice Rioli; Paul Roos; Dale Weightman; Greg Williams; Peter Wilson	Greg Blaney; Niall Cahalane; Val Daly; Mick Fagan; Gerry Hargan; Jimmy Kerrigan; Mick Lyons; Teddy McCarthy; Seamus McHugh; Joe McNally; Dermot McNicholl; Brian McGilligan; Ciarán Murray; Pat O'Byrne; John O'Driscoll; Damien O'Hagan; John O'Leary; Jack O'Shea; Noel Roche

- Beitzel Medal (Best player for the series) — Robert Dipierdomenico (Australia)
