= 1984 International Rules Series =

Match programme, first test

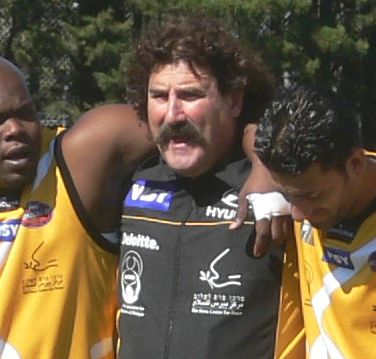
Hawthorn premiership player Robert DiPierdomenico represented Australia.

The 1984 International Rules Series, known for sponsorship reasons as the GAA Bank of Ireland International Series, was the first official series between Gaelic footballers from Ireland and Australian rules footballers from Australia. The series took place in Ireland and consisted of three test matches between the Australian and Irish international rules football teams.

While this was the first time these two countries had played a test series against each other, Australian representative teams had toured Ireland before 1967 and 1968 Australian Football World Tours. The series coincided with the centenary year of the Gaelic Athletic Association.

Australia, who were coached by John Todd and captained by another Western Australian Steve Malaxos, started the tour with a warm up match against a Connacht GAA team at Pearse Stadium. Australia lost the encounter by 14 points. In between the first and second tests, Australia were beaten by Ulster, 78 points to 28, at Armagh.

The Australian team won the test series 2–1 and finished with a superior aggregate of 222 points to Ireland's 208.

== Summary ==
First test
21 October 1984
Venue: Páirc Uí Chaoimh, Cork
Crowd: 8,000

Team	Score
(Republic of Ireland) Ireland	4-8-9 (57)
Australia	2-15-13 (70)

Ireland	Australia
P.J. Buckley; Matt Connor; Ritchie Connor; John Costello; Tommy Dwyer; Shea Fahy; Martin Furlong; Liam Hayes; Jimmy Kerrigan; Eoin Liston; Mick Lyons; Seamus McHugh; Dermot McNicholl; Brian O'Donnell; Jack O'Shea; Noel Roche; Colm O'Rourke; Barney Rock; Tom Spillane; Liam Tierney; Sean Walsh	David Ackerly; Michael Aish; Craig Bradley; Allen Daniels; Terry Daniher; Robert DiPierdomenico; Robert Flower; Ross Glendinning; Brad Hardie; Craig Holden; Stephen Kernahan; Mark Lee; Simon Madden; Steve Malaxos; Garry McIntosh; Gary Pert; Peter Motley; John Platten; Murray Rance; Maurice Rioli; Robert Wiley

Second test
28 October 1984
Venue: Croke Park, Dublin
Crowd: 12,500

Team	Score
(Republic of Ireland) Ireland	3-18-8 (80)
Australia	1-18-16 (76)

Ireland	Australia
Liam Austin; Greg Blaney; P.J. Buckley; Plunkett Donaghy; Shea Fahy; Martin Furlong; Jimmy Kerrigan; Mick Lyons; Micky Martin; Peter McGinnity; Seamus McHugh; F. McMahon; Dermot McNicholl; Brian O'Donnell; Colm O'Rourke; Jack O'Shea; Noel Roche; Barney Rock; Tom Spillane; Liam Tierney; Sean Walsh	David Ackerly; Michael Aish; Craig Bradley; Allen Daniels; Terry Daniher; Robert DiPierdomenico; Robert Flower; Ross Glendinning; Russell Greene; Brad Hardie; Gerard Healy; Craig Holden; Stephen Kernahan; Mark Lee; Steve Malaxos; Garry McIntosh; Peter Motley; Gary Pert; John Platten; Murray Rance; Maurice Rioli

Third test
4 November 1984
Venue: Croke Park, Dublin
Crowd: 32,318

Team	Score
(Republic of Ireland) Ireland	5-11-8 (71)
Australia	1-18-16 (76)

Ireland	Australia
P.J. Buckley; Matt Connor; Ritchie Connor; John Costello; Tommy Dwyer; Shea Fahy; Charlie Nelligan; Liam Hayes; Jimmy Kerrigan; Eoin Liston; Mick Lyons; Seamus McHugh; Dermot McNicholl; Brian O'Donnell; Colm O'Rourke; Jack O'Shea; Noel Roche; Barney Rock; Tom Spillane; Liam Tierney; Sean Walsh	David Ackerly; Michael Aish; Craig Bradley; Allen Daniels; Terry Daniher; Robert DiPierdomenico; Robert Flower; Ross Glendinning; Brad Hardie; Craig Holden; Stephen Kernahan; Mark Lee; Simon Madden; Steve Malaxos; Garry McIntosh; Peter Motley; Gary Pert; John Platten; Murray Rance; Maurice Rioli; Robert Wiley

Beitzel Medal (Best player for the series) — J.Kerrigan (Ireland)
