= 1990 International Rules Series =

The 1990 International Rules Series was the fourth series between Australian rules footballers from Australia and Gaelic footballers from Ireland. The series took place in Australia and consisted of three test matches between the Australian and Irish international rules football teams. Ireland won the series by 2–1 and by 24 points over the three test matches.

Martin Gavigan was Ireland vice-captain.

Eugene McGee was in charge of the Irish team. Seán McCague was his assistant manager. Brendan Hackett trained the Irish team.

Jim Stynes who had lined out for Australia in the previous series, represented Ireland in the 1990 series.

== Summary ==
First test
Venue: Waverley Park, Melbourne
Crowd: 18,332

| Team | Score |
|---|---|
| Australia | 0-10-8 (38) |
| (Republic of Ireland) Ireland | 0-12-11 (47) |

| Australia | Ireland |
|---|---|
| Brett Allison; Dean Anderson; David Bain; Gavin Brown; Neville Bruns; Matthew Campbell; Paul Couch; Terry Daniher; Danny Frawley; John Gastev; Milham Hanna; Ricky Jackson; Stewart Loewe; Steve Malaxos; Tony McGuinness; Michael Mitchell; Gary O'Donnell; Brett Stephens; John Worsfold; Stephen Wright | Keith Barr; Pat Comer; Paul Curran; Val Daly; Bernard Flynn; Martin Gavigan; John Grimley; Mark Grimley; Eamon Heery; James McCartan; Alan Mulholland; Kevin O'Brien; Steven O'Brien; Pat O'Byrne; Robbie O'Malley; Jack O'Shea; Noel Roche; Tony Scullion; B. Sex; Jim Stynes |

Second test
Venue: Bruce Stadium, Canberra
Crowd: 7,000

| Team | Score |
|---|---|
| Australia | 0-7-10 (31) |
| (Republic of Ireland) Ireland | 3-9-7 (52) |

| Australia | Ireland |
|---|---|
| Brett Allison; John Blakey; Gavin Brown; Neville Bruns; Matthew Campbell; Paul Couch; Terry Daniher; Peter Dean; Danny Frawley; John Gastev; Milham Hanna; Stewart Loewe; Steve Malaxos; Tony McGuinness; Michael Mitchell; Gary O'Donnell; Paul Salmon; Ross Smith; Brett Stephens; Stephen Wright | Tommy Carr; Pat Comer; Paul Curran; Val Daly; Mick Fagan; Bernard Flynn; Martin Gavigan; John Grimley; Eamon Heery; James McCartan; Alan Mulholland; Kevin O'Brien; Steven O'Brien; Pat O'Byrne; Robbie O'Malley; Jack O'Shea; Noel Roche; Tony Scullion; B. Sex; Jim Stynes |

Third test
Venue: WACA, Perth
Crowd: 7,700

| Team | Score |
|---|---|
| Australia | 0-13-11 (50) |
| (Republic of Ireland) Ireland | 0-12-8 (44) |

| Australia | Ireland |
|---|---|
| Dean Anderson; David Bain; Gavin Brown; Matthew Campbell; Terry Daniher; Peter Dean; Danny Frawley; John Gastev; Milham Hanna; Ricky Jackson; Stewart Loewe; Steve Malaxos; Tony McGuinness; Michael Mitchell; Gary O'Donnell; Jose Romero; Paul Salmon; Ross Smith; Brett Stephens; John Worsfold | P. Barrett; Dave Barry; B. Burke; Pat Comer; Paul Curran; Val Daly; K. Fagan; Mick Fagan; Bernard Flynn; Martin Gavigan; Mark Grimley; Eoin Liston; Alan Mulholland; Kevin O'Brien; Pat O'Byrne; Robbie O'Malley; Jack O'Shea; M. Plunkett; Tony Scullion; Jim Stynes |

Beitzel Medal (Best player for the series) — Jack O’Shea (Ireland)
