= Ger Reidy =

Ger Reidy may refer to:

- Ger Reidy (Gaelic footballer)
- Ger Reidy (poet)
