= John O'Driscoll (Gaelic footballer) =

Irish Gaelic footballer

Personal information
- Native name: Seán Ó Drisceoil (Irish)
- Born: 1 August 1967 (age 59) Ballingeary, County Cork, Ireland
- Occupation: Bank official
- Height: 5 ft 10 in (178 cm)

Sport
- Sport: Gaelic football
- Position: Full-forward
Clubs
- Years: Club
- 1985–2012: Béal Átha'n Ghaorthaidh → Muskerry
Club titles
- Cork titles: 0
College
- Years: College
- Thomond College
Inter-county
Years	County	Apps (scores)
1986–1997	Cork	29 (6–29)
Inter-county titles
- Munster titles: 7
- All-Irelands: 2
- NFL: 1
- All Stars: 0

John O'Driscoll (born 1 August 1967) is an Irish former Gaelic footballer. At club level he played with Béal Átha'n Ghaorthaidh, divisional side Muskerry, and, at inter-county level, he played with the Cork senior team. He has won the most Senior Munster Football Medals of any Corkman ever with 7.

== Career ==
O'Driscoll first played Gaelic football to a high standard as a boarder at Coláiste Íosagáin in Ballyvourney. At club level, he progressed from the juvenile and underage grades to adult level with the Béal Átha'n Ghaorthaidh club. O'Driscoll won Mid Cork JAFC titles in 1992, 1994 and 2005. He also earned selection to the Muskerry divisional team.

O'Driscoll first played for Cork as a member of the minor team in 1984. He was still eligible for the grade the following year and was as at midfield on the team beaten by Mayo in the 1985 All-Ireland MFC final. O'Driscoll immediately progressed to Cork's under-21 team and claimed an All-Ireland U21FC medal after beating Offaly in 1986.

O'Driscoll's senior team career was plagued by injury; however, it coincided with a golden age for Cork. He was part of the team when Cork claimed back-to-back All-Ireland SFC titles in 1989 and 1990. O'Driscoll also won seven Munster SFC medals, a joint-record for a Cork player, as well as a National Football League title in 1989.

O'Driscoll was just 19-years-old when he was selected for the Ireland international rules football team that beat Australia in the 1986 International Rules Series. He was also included on the Munster inter-provincial team, but ended his career without a Railway Cup medal.

== Honours ==
Béal Átha'n Ghaorthaidh

- Mid Cork Junior A Football Championship: 1992, 1994, 2005

Cork

- All-Ireland Senior Football Championship: 1989, 1990
- Munster Senior Football Championship: 1987, 1988, 1989, 1990, 1993, 1994, 1995
- National Football League: 1988-89
- All-Ireland Under-21 Football Championship: 1986
- Munster Under-21 Football Championship: 1986
- Munster Minor Football Championship: 1985
