= Kevin O'Brien (Wicklow Gaelic footballer) =

Irish Gaelic footballer

Personal information
- Native name: Caoimhín Ó Briain (Irish)
- Born: Wicklow, Ireland

Sport
- Sport: Gaelic football
- Position: Forward
Club
- Years: Club
- ? 1980's-2000's: Baltinglass
Club titles
- Wicklow titles: 9
- Leinster titles: 1
- All-Ireland Titles: 1
Inter-county
| Years | County | Apps (scores) |
| 1986-2001 | Wicklow | 26 (6-39) |
Inter-county titles
- Leinster titles: 1 junior
- All Stars: 1

Kevin O'Brien (Irish: Caoimhín Ó Briain) is a former Gaelic footballer from Baltinglass, County Wicklow. O'Brien was part of the great Baltinglass team that dominated Wicklow football in the 80s and 90s, winning an All-Ireland Senior Club Football Championship Title in 1990. He is also the only Wicklow recipient of an All Star having won one in 1990 at Full Forward. He won a Railway Cup medal with Leinster in 1986, before he had even played for his county and added a second in 1990. He also represented the Irish International Rules team in 1990 in the success over Australia and again in the 1998 Series. He was also part of the Wicklow team that won the All-Ireland Junior Football Championship Title in 2002. He was inducted in the GAA's Hall of Fame in 2010 and is one of the youngest recipients of the accolade. He received his award at the 2010 Leinster final.

He was appointed manager of the Wicklow under-20 football team in 2021.
