= St. Patrick's Primary School =

St. Patrick's Primary School may refer to:

- St. Patrick's Primary School, Aghagallon, Aghagallon, County Armagh, Northern Ireland
- St. Patrick's Primary School, Annaghmore, County Tyrone, Northern Ireland
- St. Patrick's Primary School, Ardboe, Ardboe, County Tyrone, Northern Ireland
- St. Patrick's Primary School, Armagh, Armagh, Northern Ireland
- St. Patrick's Primary School, Augher, Augher, County Tyrone, Northern Ireland
- St. Patrick's Primary School, Craigavon, Craigavon, County Armagh, Northern Ireland
- St. Patrick's Primary School, Crossmaglen, Crossmaglen, County Armagh, Northern Ireland
- St. Patrick's Primary School, Cullyhanna, Cullyhanna, County Armagh, Northern Ireland
- St. Patrick's Primary School, Donaghmore, Donaghmore, County Tyrone, Northern Ireland
- St. Patrick's Primary School, Dungannon, Dungannon, County Tyrone, Northern Ireland
- St. Patrick's Primary School, Hilltown, Hilltown, County Down, Northern Ireland
- St. Patrick's Primary School, Holywood, Holywood, County Down, Northern Ireland
- St. Patrick's Primary School, Liverpool, England
- St. Patrick's Primary School, Loup, Loup, County Londonderry, Northern Ireland
- St. Patrick's Primary School, Magheralin, Magheralin, County Down, Northern Ireland
- St. Patrick's Primary School, Mayobridge, Mayobridge, County Down, Northern Ireland
- St. Patrick's Primary School, Mentone, Mentone, Victoria, Australia
- St. Patrick's Primary School, Moneymore, Moneymore, County Londonderry, Northern Ireland
- St. Patrick's Primary School, Newry, Newry, County Down, Northern Ireland
- St. Patrick's Primary School, Rathfriland, Rathfriland, County Down, Northern Ireland
- St. Patrick's Primary School, Strathaven, Strathaven, Lanarkshire, Scotland
