= David Bolton =

David Bolton may refer to:

- David Bolton (Australian footballer) (born 1960), Australian rules footballer
- Dave Bolton (1937–2021), English rugby league footballer
