= Mickey Linden =

Irish Gaelic footballer

Michael Linden
Personal information
- Born: Newry, County Down, Northern Ireland
- Height: 5 ft 10 in (178 cm)

Sport
- Sport: Gaelic Football / Athletics
- Position: Right corner forward
Club
- Years: Club
- 1980–2008: Mayobridge
Club titles
- Down titles: 7
Inter-county*
Years	County	Apps (scores)
1982–2003	Down	9–64
Inter-county titles
- Ulster titles: 3
- All-Irelands: 2
- NFL: 1
- All Stars: 1
- *Inter County team apps and scores correct as of 00:21, 21 August 2009 (UTC).

Michael Rory Linden is an Irish Gaelic footballer who played for Down in the 1980s, 1990s and early 2000s. He was part of the Down team that won the All-Ireland Senior Football Championship in 1991 and 1994. Linden also won two Ulster Senior Football Championships and a National League title with Down. In 1994 he also won an All Star award and was named Texaco Footballer of the Year.

Linden usually played as a corner forward. He was renowned for his speed, "electrifying skills", turn of foot and accuracy in front of the posts with both feet. He "tore defences apart with his pace and scoring power" and "took the best back lines to the cleaners". Linden is among the top twenty all-time top Ulster scorers in Championship football. His understanding with Down play-maker Greg Blaney has been described as "near telepathic". In 2009 The Irish News named him as one of the all-time best 125 footballers from Ulster.

== Personal life ==
Linden is from Mayobridge, County Down, is married and has three sons.

== Playing career ==
=== Club ===
Linden played club football for Mayobridge. He won the Down Senior Football Championship on eight occasions, 1999, 2001, 2002, 2004, 2005, 2006, 2007, 2008, and was twice beaten finalist twice in the Ulster Senior Club Football Championship.

=== Minor & Under 21 ===
==== Senior ====
Linden made his Down Senior debut in Oct 1981. In 1983 he won the National Football League with the county. Down reached the 1986 Ulster Senior Football Championship final, but were beaten by Tyrone.

In 1991 he won his first Ulster Championship medal, with Down beating Donegal in the decider. Down defeated Kerry in the All-Ireland semi-final, before beating Meath in the All-Ireland final. The success was Down's first All-Ireland Senior Football Championship title since 1968.

Linden won a second Ulster Championship medal with Down in 1994 - overcoming Tyrone comfortably in the decider. Victories over Cork in the All-Ireland semi-final and Dublin in the final gave Linden another All-Ireland Senior medal. For his performances that year he received an All Star award and named Texaco Footballer of the Year.

Linden reached further Ulster finals with Down in 1996, 1999 and 2003. He retired from inter-county football in 2003.

== Honours ==
=== Inter-county ===
- 2 All-Ireland Senior Football Championship 1991, 1994
- 2 Ulster Senior Football Championship 1991, 1994
- 1 Ulster Under-21 Football Championship 1984
- 1 National Football League Division 1 1983
- 2 National Football League Division 2 1982, 1988
- 1 National Football League Division 3 1997

=== Club ===
- 7 Down Senior Football Championship 1999, 2001, 2002, 2004, 2005, 2006, 2007
- 5 Down Senior Football League Division 1 1993, 1999, 2001, 2002, 2004
- 1 Down Junior Football Championship 1981
- 1 Down Minor Football Championship 1980
- 1 Down Senior Football League Division 4 1980
- 1 Down Senior Football League Division 3 1981
- 1 Down Senior Football League Division 2 1990

=== Individual ===
- 1 All Star 1994
- 1 Texaco Footballer of the Year 1994
- 1 Irish News Ulster All-Stars 1995
- In May 2020, the Irish Independent named Linden as one of the "dozens of brilliant players" who narrowly missed selection for its "Top 20 footballers in Ireland over the past 50 years".

== Athletics ==
In 2009 Linden joined Dunleer Athletics Club, at the behest of former Tyrone footballer Patsy Forbes. Later that year at the age of 46 and six years after retiring from inter-county football - Linden added to his All-Ireland medal haul. In the 2009 Irish Over-45 Championships in Tullamore, Offaly he won two golds and a silver in the 45–50 category. He was first in both the 100 metres and long jump and finished runner-up in the 200 metres.
