= Joe McNally =

Joe McNally may refer to:

- Joe McNally (Gaelic footballer) (born c. 1964), played for Dublin
- Joe McNally (photographer) (born 1952), American photographer
