= Ciarán Murray =

Monaghan Gaelic footballer

Personal information
- Born: Clones, County Monaghan, Ireland
- Occupation: Physiotherapist

Sport
- Sport: Gaelic football
- Position: Centre half back
Club
- Years: Club
- St Tiernach's Clones
Inter-county
Years	County	Apps (scores)
1982–1990	Monaghan	55
Inter-county titles
- Ulster titles: 2
- All-Irelands: 0
- NFL: 1
- All Stars: 1

Ciarán Murray is a former Gaelic footballer who played at senior level for the Monaghan county team.

== Playing career ==
Murray helped Monaghan to victory in the 1984–85 National Football League Final defeating Armagh. He collected two Ulster Senior Football Championship medals in 1985, beating Derry and again in 1988, defeating Tyrone in Clones. He claimed an All-Star Award for his efforts in 1985. He played for Ireland in the 1986 and 1987 International Rules Series against Australia. In 1991, he retired from football due to persistent knee injuries. Murray acted as physio to the Republic of Ireland national football team in the 2002 FIFA World Cup and was seen on TV embracing Mick McCarthy following Robbie Keane's late, late equaliser against Germany. He was still Ireland physio when Brian Kerr was manager.
