= Coen Livingstone =

Australian rules footballer (born 2005)

Personal information
- Born: 25 May 2005 (age 21)
- Original teams: Perth (WAFL); York (AJFA)
- Draft: 2023 Category B rookie selection
- Height: 200 cm (6 ft 7 in)
- Weight: 96 kg (212 lb)
- Position: Ruck

Playing career^{1}
Years	Club	Games (Goals)
2024–2025	West Coast	0 (0)

Representative team honours
Years	Team	Games (Goals)
2025	Indigenous All-Stars	1 (0)
- ^{1} Playing statistics correct to the end of 2025.

Coen Livingstone (born 25 May 2005) is an Australian rules footballer. He was signed as a rookie with the West Coast Eagles in the Australian Football League (AFL).

== Early life ==
Hailing from York Football Club in the Avon Junior Football Association, Livingstone signed with the Perth Football Club to work under former AFL ruck Fraser McInnes.

Livingstone, a member of the Next Generation Academy at the West Coast Eagles, impressed for the Perth's under-19 team in the WAFL Colts during 2023. He represented Western Australia at the AFL National Championships later in the season. He kicked 20 goals and averaged 16 disposals and 22 hit-outs across just 14 appearance. He won the Jack Clarke Medal as the best and fairest player of the WAFL Colts league in 2023.

He is the nephew of former Hawthorn premiership player Chance Bateman.

== AFL career ==
Livingstone joined the West Coast Eagles as a Category B rookie in 2023.

In 2025, Livingstone played for the Indigenous All-Stars when they played Fremantle in a pre-season exhibition match. He had 16 hit-outs and 5 disposals, but suffered an internal injury and was hospitalised after the game.

Despite featuring 36 times for the Eagles' reserves team in the WAFL, Livingstone did not play at AFL level across his two seasons at the club. He was delisted at the conclusion of the 2025 AFL season.

He joined the West Perth Football Club ahead of the 2026 WAFL season.
