= Brian McGilligan =

Irish Gaelic footballer and hurler

Personal information
- Born: 19 December 1963 (age 62) Benedy, Dungiven, Northern Ireland
- Occupation: Site manager
- Height: 6 ft 3 in (191 cm)

Sport
- Football Position: Midfield
Clubs
- Years: Club
- Dungiven; Kevin Lynch's
Inter-county
- Years: County
- Derry
Inter-county titles
	Football	Hurling
Ulster Titles	2	
All-Ireland Titles	1	-
League titles	3	-
All-Stars	2	

Brian McGilligan (born 19 December 1963) is an Irish former dual player of Gaelic games, who played Gaelic football at senior level for the Derry county team in the 1980s and 1990s, especially the 1993 team. He was part of Derry's 1993 All-Ireland Championship winning side and also won two Ulster Championships with the side. For his performances in the 1987 and 1993 Championships he won two All Star awards.

In addition to Gaelic football, McGilligan also played hurling for Derry. He played club football for St Canice's GAC Dungiven and hurling for Kevin Lynch's. After being part of the backroom staff for 2007, he was appointed Derry Senior and Under 21 hurling manager for 2008. In September 2008 he announced his interest in the vacant Derry Senior football manager's job. He was also a selector on the Derry Under 21 team which won the Ulster Under 21 and All-Ireland Under 21 Championships in 1997.

== Personal life ==
McGilligan was born in Benedy outside Dungiven and attended Dernaflaw National School. He went to St Patrick's College, Dungiven.

== Inter-county career ==
McGilligan was part of Derry's 1987 Ulster Championship winning team and won an All Star for his performances that year, which included a man of the match display against Meath, despite Derry being defeated. He added a second All-Star and Ulster medal in 1993 in addition to winning All-Ireland with Derry, defeating Cork in the final.

He won National Football League medals with Derry in 1992, 1995 and 1996 and also holds Railway Cup medals. McGilligan won Personality of the Year at the 1996 Ulster GAA Writer's Association Awards.

== International rules career ==
Kevin Heffernan, manager of the Ireland international rules football team at the time, noticed McGilligan in a hurling match for Derry against Dublin in Parnell Park. He was so impressed with McGilligan's performance, that he asked him to play for Ireland in the 1986 International Rules series.
