= Stephen Rowe (footballer) =

Australian rules footballer

Personal information
- Full name: Stephen J. Rowe
- Born: 3 November 1965 (age 61)
- Original team: South Fremantle
- Height: 178 cm (5 ft 10 in)
- Weight: 87 kg (192 lb)

Playing career^{1}
Years	Club	Games (Goals)
1985–1986	South Fremantle	27 (31)
1987–1997	Norwood	185 (206)
1991–1995	Adelaide	29 (24)
- ^{1} Playing statistics correct to the end of 1997.

Career highlights
- Norwood Premiership player (1997)

Stephen Rowe (born 3 November 1965) is a former Australian rules footballer who played for the South Fremantle Football Club in the West Australian Football League (WAFL), the Norwood Football Club in the South Australian National Football League (SANFL) and the Adelaide Football Club in the Australian Football League (AFL).

Rowe started his senior career at South Fremantle in 1985, having won the Jack Clarke Medal as the best player in the 1984 WAFL Colts season.

After two seasons in the WAFL seniors, Rowe crossed to Norwood and went on to win their "best and fairest" award in 1990. At the end of the year he was recruited by Adelaide, where he would spend five seasons. A rover, he had 30 disposals against Essendon in just his second league game but could only put together 11 appearances in his first two seasons. He played 15 games in 1993 and then missed the entire 1994 season when he injured his knee in the SANFL. Following a knee reconstruction, Rowe returned to the Adelaide side in 1995 but would play just three games. He retired in 1997, after playing in Norwood's grand final win against Port Adelaide.

He has since become a well known personality on Adelaide radio station FIVEaa where he co-hosts the weekday drive-time (4pm - 7pm) sports show with Tim Ginever. He previously co-hosted with former Crows captains Mark Bickley, Chris McDermott and former Crows coach, Graham Cornes. The former South Australian interstate football representative has also been involved in coaching. He was coach of Norwood's under-17s team for five years and was an assistant coach at Glenelg from 2006 to 2011.

In the 2020 AFL draft, Rowe's son James was drafted by the Adelaide Football Club with the 38th selection.
