= Mossie Lyons =

Irish Gaelic footballer

Mossie Lyons is an Irish Gaelic football half-back who plays with the Castleisland Desmonds club side, and formerly with the Kerry county team.

== Playing career ==
Lyons was first selected for the Kerry senior team in 2000, after playing for the county in the All-Ireland Minor Football Championship and All-Ireland Under-21 Football Championship. He won a number of inter-county All-Ireland Senior Football Championships as a substitute (Kerry winning in 2000, 2004, 2006 and 2007), but never established himself in the half-back line, with a number of very talented footballers like Séamus Moynihan and Tomás Ó Sé occupying the starting spots. He retired after winning the 2007 All-Ireland championship with Kerry.
