= Bruce Lindsay (footballer) =

Australian rules footballer

Personal information
- Full name: Bruce A. Lindsay
- Born: 22 July 1961 (age 65)
- Height: 178 cm (5 ft 10 in)
- Weight: 77 kg (170 lb)

Playing career^{1}
Years	Club	Games (Goals)
1978–90	West Torrens	242 (146)
1991	Adelaide	6 (0)
1991–92	Woodville-West Torrens	6 (4)
Total		254 (150)
- ^{1} Playing statistics correct to the end of 1991.

Bruce A. Lindsay (born 22 July 1961) is a former Australian rules footballer who played for West Torrens in the South Australian National Football League (SANFL), and the Adelaide Football Club in the Australian Football League (AFL).

Lindsay made his SANFL debut in 1978 and won West Torrens' best and fairest award in just his second season. A serious knee injury in the 1980 Elimination Final interrupted his career for the next two years. He was club captain from 1984 until 1990, thus having the distinction of leading West Torrens in their final year before merging with Woodville.

In 1990 he joined the Crows as a foundation player and took part in their inaugural league game, an 86-point win over that season's eventual premiers Hawthorn at Football Park.

Lindsay represented South Australia at the 1979 Perth State of Origin Carnival and nine times in all. He also captained the Australia international rules football team in their 1987 tour of Ireland, the same year he was state captain.

He made half a dozen appearances for the newly formed Woodville-West Torrens before retiring in 1992. He was later honoured for his contributions to the SANFL by being inducted, in 2004, to the South Australian Football Hall of Fame.
