= Mayobridge GAA =

Gaelic football club, County Down, Northern Ireland

Mayobridge
- Cumann Naomh Phádraig, Droichead Mhaigh Eo
- Founded: 1888
- County: Down
- Nickname: The 'Bridge
- Colours: Sky Blue and Navy
- Grounds: St. Patrick's Gaelic Athletic Social Club, Old Road, Mayobridge
- Coordinates: 54.1829°N 6.2249°W

Playing kits
Standard colours

Senior Club Championships
	All Ireland	Ulster champions	Down champions
Football:	-	-	10

Mayobridge Gaelic Athletic Association, also called Mayobridge Gaelic Athletic Club or Saint Patrick's Gaelic Athletic Social Club, is a Gaelic football and ladies' Gaelic football club based in Mayobridge, County Down, Northern Ireland.

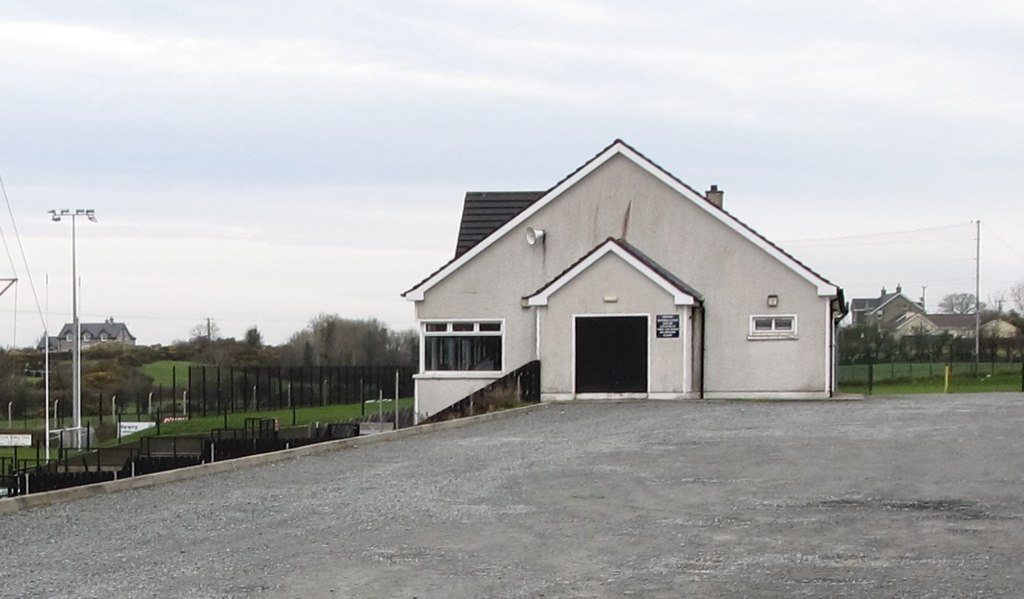
Clubhouse

== History ==
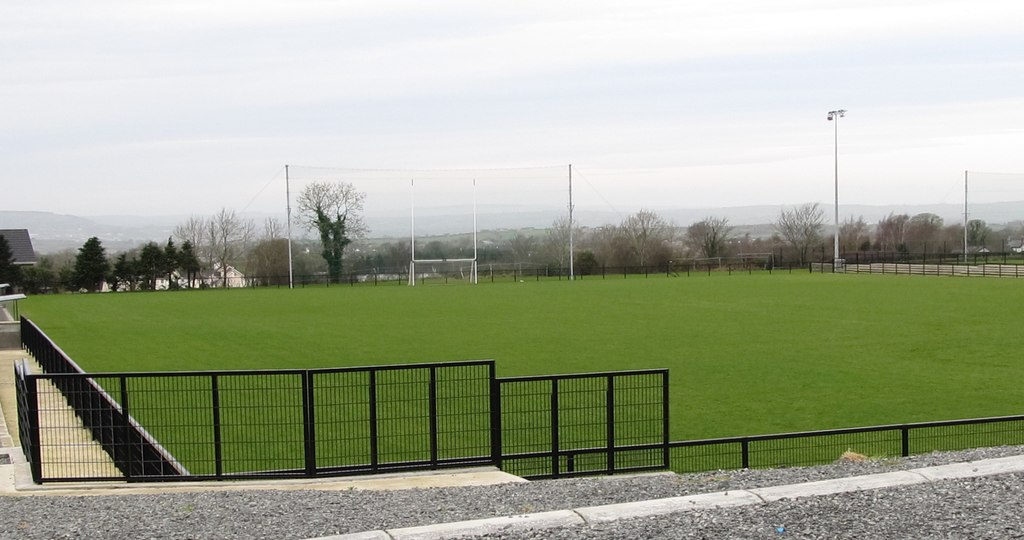
Mayobridge's playing fields

The club was founded in 1888 as Saint Patrick's Mayobridge and is the oldest in County Down. The minutes of the Central Council of the GAA record that on 30 April 1888, an application for affiliation was received from St Patrick's Mayobridge County Down. The acceptance of that application makes the club the oldest registered GAA club in the county. Mayobridge won the county title in 1918 and 1919. The youth club and later club grounds were opened in 1978.

Mayobridge enjoyed a golden age around the turn of the millennium, winning eight senior county titles in ten years (1999 to 2008) and reaching the final of the Ulster Senior Club Football Championship twice, in 2001 and 2004.

== Honours ==
- Down Senior Football Championship (10): 1918, 1919, 1999, 2001, 2002, 2004, 2005, 2006, 2007, 2008
- Down Junior Football Championship (1): 1981
- Down Minor Football Championship (4): 1980, 1997, 1999, 2008, 2023

== Notable players ==
- Brendan Coulter
- Conor Garvey
- Mickey Linden
- Tom O'Hare
- Charlie Smyth
