= Noel Roche =

Irish Gaelic footballer

Noel Roche is a former Gaelic footballer who played for St Senan's and the Clare county team. Some sources suggest he is among the county's greatest ever players. He also represented Ireland in the International Rules Series.

Roche has been selected for inclusion in the Munster GAA Hall of Fame, inducted alongside Nicky English in December 2022. He won a Munster Senior Football Championship medal in 1992.

== See also ==
- 1984 International Rules Series
- 1986 International Rules Series
- 1987 International Rules Series
- 1990 International Rules Series
