= Tom O'Hare =

Irish Gaelic footballer

Personal information
- Native name: Tomás Ó hEithir (Irish)
- Born: Mayobridge, County Down

Sport
- Sport: Gaelic football
- Position: Left corner-back
Club
- Years: Club
- 1950s-1980s: Mayobridge
Club titles
- Down titles: 0
Inter-county
- Years: County
- 1960s-1970s: Down
Inter-county titles
- Ulster titles: 5
- All-Irelands: 1
- NFL: 1

Tom O'Hare (born 1943 in Mayobridge, County Down) is a former Irish sportsperson. He played Gaelic football with his local clubs Mayobridge and Clonduff and was a member of the Down senior inter-county team from the 1960s until the 1970s. O'Hare won an All-Ireland winners' medal with Down in 1968, scoring two points from 45s. He is currently a trustee and president of his club Mayobridge. O'Hare was named on Mícheál Ó Muircheartaigh's team of his life, which was published in the Sunday Independent.

Tom married Eileen Kelly from neighbouring Clonduff and they had 6 children Cathy Padraig John Thomas Bridgeen and Joseph.

Sporting positions
Preceded by	Down Senior Football Captain; 1970	Succeeded by
