= Jack Clarke Medal =

West Australian Football League Colts award

The Jack Clarke Medal is an award for the fairest and best player in the West Australian Football League Colts (under-19) competition.

== History ==
The award was previously known as the Burley Medal and the Medallists Medal before being renamed in honour of East Fremantle footballer Jack Clarke.

== Winners ==
Year	Winner	Club
1957	Peter Ridley	Swan Districts
1958	Phil Kirkham	West Perth
1959	Graeme John	East Perth
1960	Brian Ham	Claremont
1961	Pat Astone	Perth
1962	Ivan Glucina	South Fremantle
1963	Ron Harding	Perth
1964	Reg Firth	Subiaco
1965	Ron Viney	Perth
1966	Errol Hammond	Subiaco
1966	Gordon Bancroft	South Fremantle
1967	Kerry McCarthy	East Perth
1968	John Bell	East Perth
1969	Robbie Becker	Claremont
1970	Max Ford	South Fremantle
1971	Brian Bushell	Subiaco
1972	Leon Henry	Perth
1973	Greg Wright	Subiaco
1974	Neil Taylor	Subiaco
1975	Craig Holden	Swan Districts
1976	Tony Capriotti	East Perth
1977	Phil Narkle	Swan Districts
1978	Chris Stasinowsky	West Perth
1979	John Bengough	Subiaco
1980	Laurie Keene	Subiaco
1981	David O'Connell	Claremont
1982	John Rioli	South Fremantle
1983	Derek Collard	South Fremantle
1984	Stephen Rowe	South Fremantle
1985	Mark Amaranti	East Fremantle
1986	Grant Robson	Subiaco
1987	Nicky Yarran	Claremont
1988	Rob Malone	Claremont
1989	David Ham	Claremont
1989	Graham Ralph	East Fremantle
1990	Brendan Hendry	Claremont
1991	Paul Leuba	Claremont
1992	Austin Kelly	Perth
1993	Damon Squires	Perth
1994	Todd Burgess	Swan Districts
1995	Kevin Humphries	East Perth
1995	Mark Dimmmock	Claremont
1995	Jason Musca	Subiaco
1996	Haaron Bokhari	Claremont
1997	Michael Pell	Claremont
1998	Jamie Christopher	Claremont
1999	Andrew Catalano	Perth
2000	Matthew Cremin	East Fremantle
2001	Andrew Green	East Fremantle
2002	Kepler Bradley	West Perth
2003	Matthew Spencer	Swan Districts
2004	Andrew Ruck	Claremont
2005	Ryan Brabazon	Claremont
2006	Ian Richardson	Claremont
2007	Adam Cockie	Subiaco
2008	Jordan Eastwell	East Perth
2009	Aaron Elari	Perth
2010	Tom Ledger	Claremont
2011	Kerwin Stuart	Perth
2012	Dean Kent	Perth
2013	Jacob Green	East Fremantle
2014	Albert Dean	Swan Districts
2015	Stan Wright	East Perth
2016	Michael Humble	Peel Thunder
2017	Luke English	Perth
2018	Liam Hickmott	Subiaco
2019	Koopah Todd	West Perth
2020	Lachlan Vanirsen	Subiaco
2021	Joshua Browne	East Fremantle
2022	Kane Bevan	West Perth
2023	Coen Livingstone	Perth
2023	Riley Wills	Subiaco
2024	Declan Pauline	East Fremantle
