= Dermot Hannafin (Snr) =

Irish Gaelic footballer

Personal information
- Born: Fenit, County Kerry
- Died: 6 April 2012 (aged 84)

Sport
- Sport: Gaelic football
- Position: Midfield
Club
- Years: Club
- 1950s-19??: Castleisland Desmonds
Club titles
- Kerry titles: 1
Inter-county
Years	County	Apps (scores)
1950-1953	Kerry	8 (1-01)
Inter-county titles
- Munster titles: 3
- All-Irelands: 1
- NFL: 0

Dermot Hannafin (born in Fenit, County Kerry - died 6 April 2012) was a Gaelic footballer with his local club Castleisland Desmonds and was a member of the Kerry senior inter-county team from 1950 until 1952. His son, also Dermot, played with Kerry during the 1980s and 1990s.

== Playing career ==
=== Club ===
Hannafin played his club football with his local Castleisland Desmonds club and enjoyed some success. He won a county SFC with Castleisland District in 1950, their only success to date.

=== Intercounty ===
Hannafin also played with Kerry from 1950 to 1953. He won Munster Championship medals in 1950, '51 and '53 and an All Ireland medal in 1953. The All Ireland final of 1953 was the only game of the championship that year.
