= Kieran Goss =

Singer-songwriter in Ireland

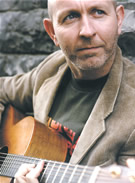

Background information
- Born: 1962; Mayobridge, County Down, Northern Ireland
- Genres: Folk, country
- Occupation: Singer-songwriter
- Instrument(s): Vocals, guitar
- Years active: 1989–present
- Labels: Cog Communications
- Website: kierangoss.com

Kieran Goss is a contemporary singer-songwriter.

== Biography ==
Kieran Goss was born and raised in Mayobridge, County Down, Northern Ireland.

Goss recorded his first album, Brand New Star, in 1989. It contained the songs "Brand New Star" and "Just Around The Corner," which came to the attention of Mary Black as she was preparing the album Babes in the Wood. She recorded both songs.

Kieran followed up Brand New Star with New Day in 1994 and in 1998 he released the album Worse Than Pride, which contained the Top 10 single "Out Of My Head." It was the second most played song on Irish radio that year. Worse Than Pride achieved double platinum status nine months after it was released. Red-Letter Day followed this in 2000 containing fan-favourite "Reasons To Leave".

In the winter of 2002, Goss released the compilation Out of my Head... The Best Of Kieran Goss. His sixth studio album, Blue Sky Sunrise, was recorded in Tennessee in the spring of 2005 and was produced by Rodney Crowell and Peter Coleman. It was released later that year.

Goss currently resides in County Sligo, Ireland.

== Discography ==
=== Albums ===
- Brand New Star (1989)
- Frances Black & Kieran Goss (1991)
- New Day (1994)
- Worse Than Pride (1998)
- Red-Letter Day (2000)
- Blue Sky Sunrise (2005)
- Trio Live (2008)
- I'll Be Seeing You (2009)
- For The Record (2010)
- Solo (2014)
- Oh, The Starlings (2019) – performing as a duo, Kieran Goss and Annie Kinsella

=== Compilations ===
- Out of My Head... The Best of Kieran Goss (2002) O Connor
- A cover version of Underneath Your Clothes on Even Better than the Real Thing Vol. 1

=== DVDs ===
- Kieran Goss Live at Belfast Opera House (2011)

== Miscellaneous ==
- Kieran is an uncle to the treble Oscar-nominated director Tomm Moore.
