= Mayobridge =

Coordinates: 54.1810°N 6.2289°W

Mayobridge: Irish: Droichead Mhaigh Eo
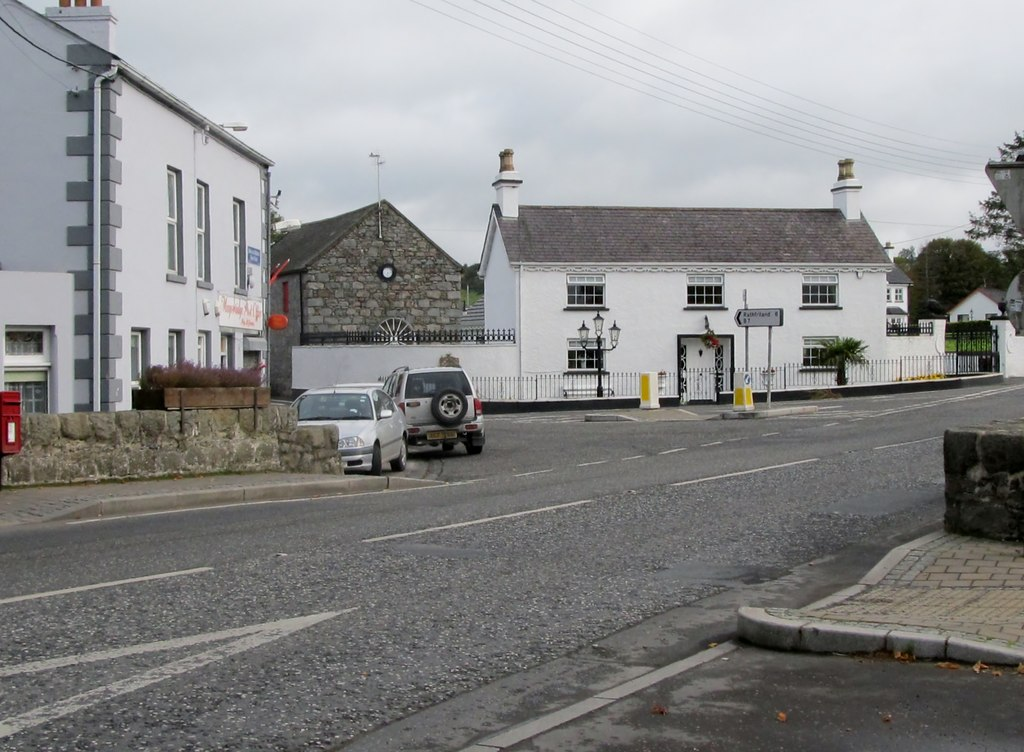
- Village centre

- Location within County Down
- Population: 1,069 (2011 Census)
- District: Newry and Mourne
- County: County Down
- Country: Northern Ireland
- Sovereign state: United Kingdom
- Post town: NEWRY
- Postcode district: BT34
- Dialling code: 028
- Police: Northern Ireland
- Fire: Northern Ireland
- Ambulance: Northern Ireland
- UK Parliament: South Down
- NI Assembly: South Down

Mayobridge (from Irish Droichead Mhaigh Eo 'bridge on the plain of yews') is a village within County Down, Northern Ireland. It lies on the small river Clanrye, which divides the townlands of Mayo and Bavan, 4.4 miles (7.1 km) east of Newry. It had a population of 1,069 as at 2011. Administratively, it is within the Newry and Mourne District Council area, and falls within the parish of Clonallan, and historically within the barony of Iveagh Upper, Upper Half.

== Demography ==
Mayobridge is classified as a small village or hamlet by the NI Statistics and Research Agency (NISRA). It had a usually resident population of 1,069 according to the 2011 census.

== Facilities ==
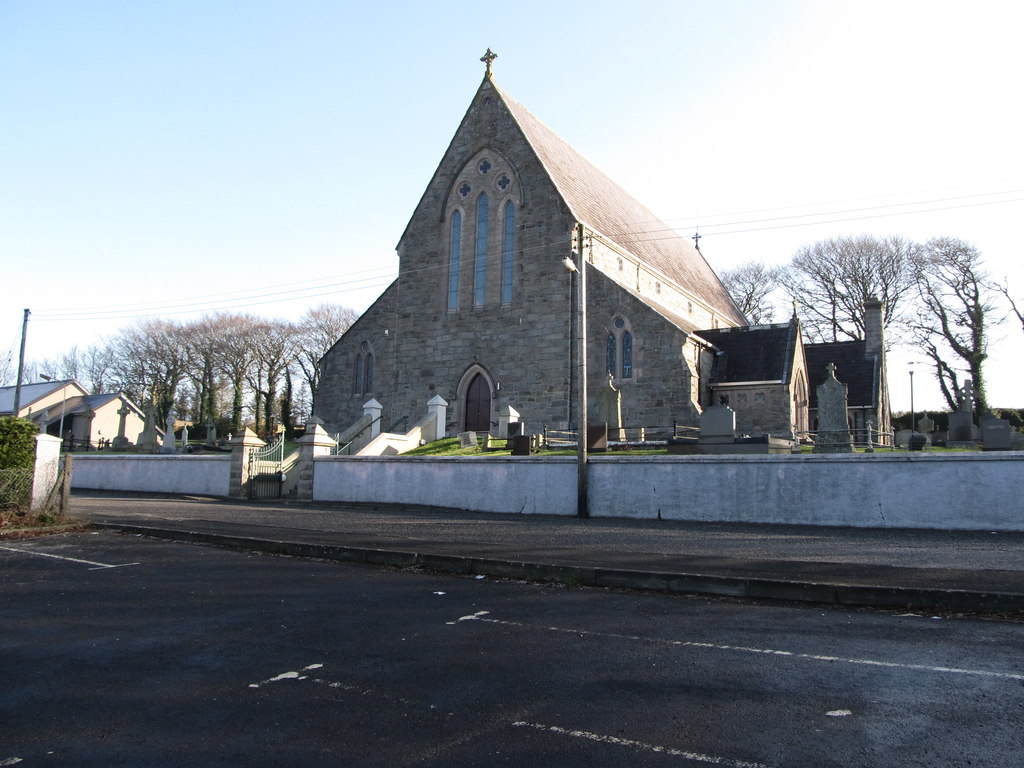
St Patrick's Church

On 15 August 1859, Dr. Leahy, the co-adjutor bishop of the diocese, blessed the foundation stone of a new Catholic church to replace the existing, more primitive Mass house put up in 1806 (parts of which are still visible in the disused parochial hall); and a curate was appointed to live in Mayobridge. The new church, dedicated to St. Patrick, was erected on the site of a former Mass rock. A Gothic-style building, reputed to be the largest 'country' church in the diocese, it could hold up to 600 worshippers in comfort, and had views over the surrounding countryside and into County Armagh. It was completed on 12 October 1862, with a dedicatory sermon by the then Bishop of Kerry, Dr. David Moriarty.

A police barracks was moved in 1854 from the Mayo side of the village to the Bavan side, and returned in 1865.

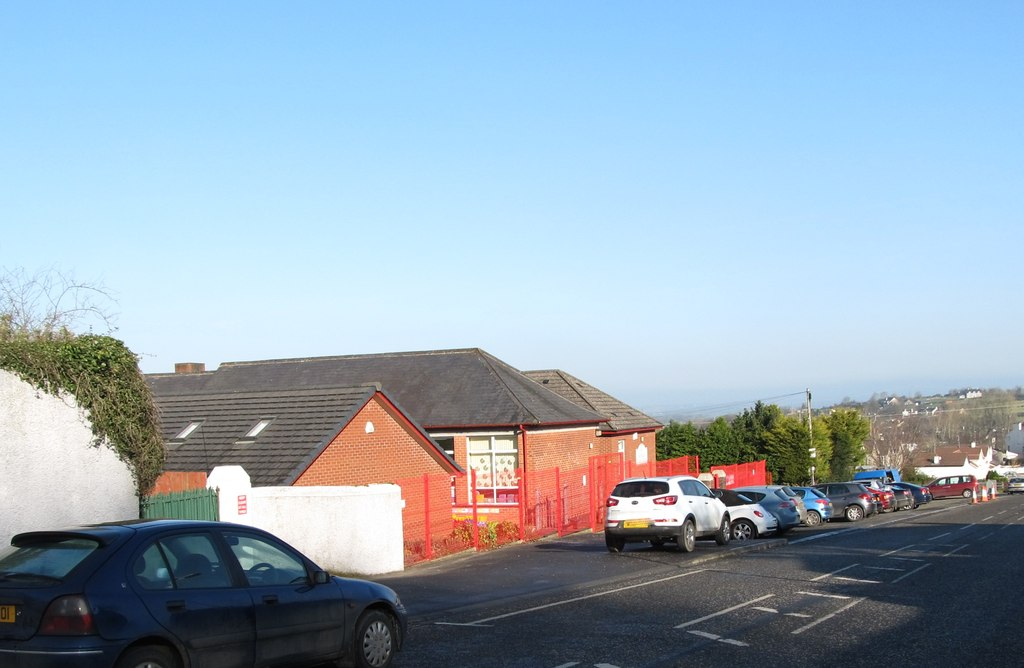
St Patrick's Primary School

The local primary school, St. Patrick's Primary School, is located on Chapel Hill.

== Sport ==
Mayobridge St. Patrick's is a Gaelic Athletic Association club affiliated with the Down County Board. The minutes of the Central Council of the GAA record that, on 30 April 1888, an application for affiliation was received from St Patrick's, Mayobridge. The acceptance of the application makes it the oldest registered GAA club in the county. Mayobridge won their tenth Down Senior Football Championship in 2008. The club's minor team won the Down Minor Football Championship in 2023.

== Notable people ==
- Kieran Goss (b. 1962) contemporary singer, songwriter
- Tommy Sands (b. 1945) folk singer, songwriter and radio broadcaster
- Mickey Linden, Gaelic footballer, winner of All-Ireland Senior Football Championship in 1991 and 1994
- Tom O'Hare (b. 1942) Gaelic footballer, winner of All-Ireland Senior Football Championship in 1968
- Charlie Smyth (b. 2001) Gaelic footballer and NFL kicker

== See also ==
- List of villages in Northern Ireland
