= Ger Reidy (Gaelic footballer) =

Irish Gaelic footballer

Personal information
- Native name: Gearoid Ó Riada (Irish)
- Born: 29 June 1986 (age 40)

Sport
- Sport: Gaelic football
- Position: Goalkeeper
Club
- Years: Club
- 1993–: Castleisland Desmonds
Inter-county
Years	County	Apps (scores)
2009–2010	Kerry	5 (0-00)
Inter-county titles
- All-Irelands: 1

Ger Reidy (Irish: Gearóid Ó Riada) is a former Gaelic footballer who, between 2009 and 2010, was a member of the Kerry senior football team. At club level, he was a goalkeeper for Castleisland Desmonds.

Reidy made his intercounty debut in a National League fixture versus Donegal in Austin Stack Park, Tralee. He went on to play in 3 further matches in Kerry's ultimately successful 2009 Allianz National Football League Division 1 campaign against Derry, Westmeath and Galway conceding only one goal (to Galway).

For Kerry's 2009 All-Ireland Senior Football Championship campaign, he was substitute goalkeeper and although he made no appearance, as a member of the winning squad, he gained his first All Ireland Senior Football medal.

Following the retirement of Diarmuid Murphy, Reidy was tipped as a front runner for the No 1 shirt and started out the year by winning a McGrath Cup medal when Kerry overcame UCC in the final. He lined out for Kerry against Dublin in the opening match of the 2010 NFL campaign. However, on 10 March 2010, he announced his resignation from the Kerry squad.

In October 2010, Reidy was part of the Castleisland Desmonds squad who would go on to win RTÉ's Celebrity Bainisteoir competition, beating Ballymun Kickhams in the final at Parnell Park, Dublin.

In 2012, Reidy was goalkeeper for Kingdom Kerry Gaels, a Senior London side based in the north of the city. He was a member of the squad that lost the London Senior Football Final in Ruislip against rivals Tir Chonaill Gaels. He later played for Castleisland Desmonds in County Kerry.

== Achievements ==
- All-Ireland Senior Football Championship, 2009
- Allianz National Football League Div.1, 2009
- McGrath Cup 2010
- North Kerry Senior Football Championship, 2007
- RTÉ Celebrity Bainisteoir, 2010
