= Rounders All Stars Awards =

This page lists GAA Rounders All Star Awards winners from 2002 onwards. These awards are presented annually to that year's "most consistent" senior GAA rounders players.

== Men ==
=== 2002 ===
Position	Player	Club
Catcher	Richard Costello	Limekiln
Pitcher	James Anderson	Erne Eagles
First base	Gary Reilly	Erne Eagles
Second base	Derek Duggan	Limekiln
Third base	Damien McArdle	Erne Eagles
Short stop	Gerard Clerkin	Erne Eagles
Outfield	Cormac Ó Túatain	Naomh Mhíchil
Outfield	Eddie Healy	Limekiln
Outfield	Tom Murphy	Cúchulainn
Outfield	Jim Reilly	Erne Eagles
Outfield	Kevin Ó Hagan	Naomh Mhíchil
Outfield	Séamus Mulhare	The Heath

=== 2003 ===
Position	Player	Club
Catcher	Damien McArdle	Erne Eagles
Pitcher	Gary Reilly	Erne Eagles
First base	Tom Murphy	Cúchulainn
Second base	Ollie Fitzsimons	Erne Eagles
Third base	Jim Reilly	Erne Eagles
Short stop	Kevin Ó Hagan	Naomh Mhíchil
Outfield	Michael O'Leary	Cúchulainn
Outfield	Eddie Healy	Limekiln
Outfield	Damien Coey	Naomh Mhíchil

=== 2004 ===
Position	Player	Club
Catcher	Des Mulhare	The Heath
Pitcher	Gary Reilly	Erne Eagles
First base	Mark Cluxton Corley	Wolfe Tones Sallins
Second base	Ollie Fitzsimons	Erne Eagles
Third base	Damien McArdle	Erne Eagles
Short stop	Kevin Ó Hagan	Naomh Mhíchil
Left outfield	Patrick Coey	Naomh Mhíchil
Centre outfield	Eddie Healy	Limekiln
Right outfield	Adam Riordan	Limekiln

=== 2005 ===
Position	Player	Club
Catcher	Seán Hughes	Erne Eagles
Pitcher	Colm Brennan	Cúchulainn
First base	Kevin Goode	Limekiln
Second base	Ollie Fitzsimons	Erne Eagles
Third base	David Whitson	
Short stop	Gerard Clerkin	Erne Eagles
Outfield	Mattie Dowling	Cúchulainn
Outfield	David Ryan	Limekiln
Outfield	Kevin Ó Hagan	Naomh Mhíchil

=== 2006 ===
Position	Player	Club
Catcher	Daniel Clerkin	Limekiln
Pitcher	Darren Goode	Limekiln
First base	Damien McArdle	Erne Eagles
Second base	Christopher Hughes	Limekiln
Third base	Jim Reilly	Erne Eagles
Short stop	Patrick Coey	Naomh Mhíchil
Outfield	David Reilly	Erne Eagles
Outfield	David Ryan	Limekiln
Outfield	Kevin Ó Hagan	Naomh Mhíchil

=== 2007 ===
Position	Player	Club
Catcher	Damien McArdle	Erne Eagles
Pitcher	Colm Brennan	Cúchulainn
First base	Kenneth Nolan	Cúchulainn
Second base	Nicky Brennan	Cúchulainn
Third base	Jim Reilly	Erne Eagles
Short stop	Patrick Coey	Naomh Mhíchíl
Outfield	Mattie Dowling	Cúchulainn
Outfield	Sean Óg Brady	Erne Eagles
Outfield	John Nolan	Limekiln

=== 2008 ===
Position	Player	Club
Catcher	P.J. Kelly	St Clares
Pitcher	Colm Brennan	Cúchulainn
First base	Cathal Whelan	The Heath
Second base	Hugh Briody	Erne Eagles
Third base	Darren Fitzgerald	Cúchulainn
Short stop	Gerard Clerkin	Erne Eagles
Outfield	James McKeown	St Clares
Outfield	Mattie Downling	Cúchulainn
Outfield	Nicky Brennan	Cúchulainn

=== 2009 ===
Position	Player	Club
Catcher	P.J. Kelly	St Clares
Pitcher	Jason Cauley	St Clares
First base	Gary Reilly	Erne Eagles
Second base	Seán Hughes	Erne Eagles
Third base	Jim Reilly	Erne Eagles
Short stop	Gerard Clerkin	Erne Eagles
Left outfield	James McKeown	St Clares
Centre outfield	Stephen Bury	St Clares
Right outfield	Declan Frawley	Clarecastle

2022

Position	Player	Club
Catcher	Damien Mccardle	Erne Eagles
Pitcher	James Anderson	Erne Eagles
First base	Shane Sheridan	Erne Eagles
Second base	Billy Connors	Cúchulainn
Third base	Justin Burns	Carrickmacross Emmets
Short stop	Pierce Ryan	Cúchulainn
Left outfield	John Michael Nolan	Cúchulainn
Centre outfield	Darryl Dolan	Erne Eagles
Right outfield	Tom Moore	The Heath
Intermediate	Brochan O'Reilly	Emo
Junior	Jonah Lawlor	St Senans

=== 2023 ===
Position	Player	Club
Catcher	Colm Kiernan	Carrickmacross Emmets
Pitcher	Dwayne Keane	The Heath
First base	Shane Sheridan	Erne Eagles
Second base	Paul Behan	Limekiln
Third base	Paul Delaney	Adamstown
Short stop	Patrick Bermingham	Carrickmacross Emmets
Left outfield	Owen Roe O'Neill	Erne Eagles
Centre outfield	Oran Kiernan	Carrickmacross Emmets
Right outfield	Victor del Rosal	Breaffy
Roaming fielder	Darryl Dolan	Erne Eagles
Intermediate	Seán Bailey	Michael Glavey's
Junior	Aidan Connaughton	Kilmeena

== Women ==
=== 2002 ===
Position	Player	Club
Catcher	Andrea Barber	Erne Eagles
Pitcher	Elaine Costello	Limekiln
Infield	Grace Doyle	Bagenalstown
Infield	Jackie Donnelly	Limekiln
Infield	Una Brady	Erne Eagles
Short stop	Tara Corrigan	Rath Domhnaigh
Outfield	Jennie Ó'Brien	Bagenalstown
Outfield	Lizzy Maguire	Limekiln
Outfield	Anne Marie Gardiner	Bagenalstown
Outfield	Laura Eagers	Limekiln
Outfield	Roisín Ó Hagan	Naomh Mhíchil
Outfield	Nicola Doherty	Rath Domhnaigh

=== 2003 ===
Position	Player	Club
Catcher	Fionnuala Ní Thúatáin	Naomh Mhíchíl
Pitcher	Elaine Costello	Limekiln
First base	Niamh Haverty	Limekiln
Second base	Lizzie Maguire	Limekiln
Third base	Dympna Reilly	Erne Eagles
Short stop	Pauline Ryan	Naomh Mháirtín
Centre outfield	Bernie Bowe	Rath Domhnaigh
Right outfield	Maura Quirke	Cúchulainn
Left outfield	Louise Clarke	Bagenalstown

=== 2004 ===
Position	Player	Club
Catcher	Fionnuala Ní Thúatáin	Naomh Mhíchíl
Pitcher	Elaine Costello	Limekiln
First base	Chantelle Cole	Cúchulainn
Second base	Grace Doyle	Bagenalstown
Third base	Christine Kelly	Limekiln
Short stop	Andrea Barber	Erne Eagles
Outfield	Lizzy Maguire	Limekiln
Outfield	Áine Brady	Erne Eagles
Outfield	Carmel Moloney	Cúchulainn

=== 2005 ===
Position	Player	Club
Catcher	Anne Marie Brennan	Cúchulainn
Pitcher	Nicola Clarke	Bagenalstown
First base	Olivia Kelly	
Second base	Rosaleen Reilly	Erne Eagles
Third base	Una McGlinchey	
Short stop	Pauline Ó Hagan	Naomh Mháirtín
Outfield	Laura Donnelly	Cúchulainn
Outfield	Anne Marie Donoghue	Erne Eagles
Outfield	Jennie Ó Brien	Bagenalstown

=== 2006 ===
Position	Player	Club
Catcher	Áine Brady	Erne Eagles
Pitcher	Nicola Clarke	Bagenalstown
First base	Jackie Donnelly	Limekiln
Second base	Rosaleen Reilly	Erne Eagles
Third base	Elaine Clarke	Bagenalstown
Short stop	Dympna Reilly	Erne Eagles
Outfield	Sandra Minchin	Bagenalstown
Outfield	Amy Kett	Limekiln
Outfield	Laura Donnelly	Limekiln

=== 2007 ===
Position	Player	Club
Catcher	Ruth Manning	Bagenalstown
Pitcher	Nicola Clarke	Bagenalstown
First base	Carole Hughes	Limekiln
Second base	Orla Conlon	Castlebar
Third base	Barbara Lygo	Example
Short stop	Shirleen Burns	St Clares
Outfield	Colette McCaul	St Clares
Outfield	Paula Lenehan	Castlebar
Outfield	Amy Kett	Limekiln

=== 2008 ===
Position	Player	Club
Catcher	Ruth Manning	Bagenalstown
Pitcher	Nicola Clarke	Bagenalstown
First base	Carole Hughes	Limekiln
Second base	Rosaleen Reilly	Erne Eagles
Third base	Barbara Lygo	Wolfetones
Short stop	Shirleen Burns	St Clares
Outfield	Colette McCaul	St Clares
Outfield	Laura Donnelly	Limekiln
Outfield	Amy Kett	Limekiln

=== 2009 ===
Position	Player	Club
Catcher	Lisa Lynch	St Clares
Pitcher	Louise Clarke	Bagenalstown
First base	Dympna Loughman	St Clares
Second base	Grace Doyle	Bagenalstown
Third base	Martina Kirwan	Cúchulainn
Short stop	Sarah Galligan	St Clares
Left outfield	Colette McCaul	St Clares
Centre outfield	Laura Lynch	St Clares
Right outfield	Noeleen Solan	Bagenalstown

=== 2023 ===
Position	Player	Club
Catcher	Louise Darcy	Bagenalstown
Pitcher	Nicola Clarke	Bagenalstown
First base	Danielle Moore	The Heath
Second base	Gillian Nolan	Cuchulainn
Third base	Paula Doherty	Breaffy
Short stop	Ann Hanley	Glynn–Barntown
Left outfield	Katie Kenny	Breaffy
Centre outfield	Emma Johnson	Limekiln
Right outfield	Emma Hudson	Limekiln
Roaming fielder	Aileen Kelly	Glynn-Barntown
Intermediate	Erica Meslin	Kevin's
Junior	Laura Hughes	Carrickmacross Emmets
