= David Bolton (Australian footballer) =

Australian rules footballer

Personal information
- Born: 13 July 1960 (age 66)
- Original team: Grovedale (GFL)
- Height: 176 cm (5 ft 9 in)
- Weight: 75 kg (165 lb)
- Position: Wingman

Playing career^{1}
Years	Club	Games (Goals)
1984–1985	Geelong	28 (11)
1986–1991	Sydney	95 (46)
Total		123 (57)
- ^{1} Playing statistics correct to the end of 1991.

David Bolton (born 13 July 1960) is a former Australian rules footballer who played for Geelong and Sydney in the Victorian/Australian Football League (VFL/AFL).

Originally from Grovedale Football Club in the Geelong Football League (GFL), Bolton played for Geelong Under-19s before his recruitment to South Australian National Football League (SANFL) club Woodville by coach Rodney Olsson. After three years at Woodville, Bolton, who played as a wingman, joined Geelong in 1984 and made his senior debut in the opening game of the season.

Sydney acquired Bolton's services in 1986, the same year he represented Australia in the International Rules series against the touring Irish team. He was a member of the Sydney squad which placed second in the 1986 home and away season, only to fall away in the finals. Bolton participated in another rare finals series for the club in 1987. During his career he represented South Australia, New South Wales and Victoria at interstate football.

Bolton later coached Strathmerton Football Club in the Picola and District Football League.
