= Ger Reidy (poet) =

Irish poet

Ger Reidy is a poet from Westport, County Mayo, Ireland. He has published three poetry collections, Pictures from a reservation, Drifting under the moon and Before Rain, as well as a collection of short stories called Jobs for a Wet Day.
