= Scott Salisbury =

Australian rules footballer

Personal information
- Draft: No. 23, 1987 national draft

Playing career^{1}
Years	Club	Games (Goals)
1983–1992	Glenelg	241 (69)
- ^{1} Playing statistics correct to the end of 1992.

Scott Salisbury is a former Australian rules footballer who played over 200 games for Glenelg in the South Australian National Football League (SANFL) during the 1980s and 1990s.

Salisbury, who often played in the back pocket, was a member of Glenelg's 1985 and 1986 premiership teams. He represented South Australia regularly and in 1987 was awarded All-Australian selection. On the back of, the Sydney Swans drafted Salisbury in the 1987 VFL Draft but he never made a senior appearance in the VFL. He returned to Glenelg and captained the club in both the 1991 and 1992 seasons, including their 1992 SANFL Grand Final loss to Port Adelaide.

In 2002 Salisbury was inducted into Glenelg's Hall of Fame.
