= Jim Reilly (Gaelic footballer) =

Irish Gaelic footballer

Jim Reilly (1925 - 21 June 2013) was an Irish Gaelic footballer who played as a full-back at senior level for the Meath county team.
