= Greg Blaney =

Irish dual (Gaelic football & hurling) player

Personal information
- Nickname: Heggy
- Born: Kircubbin County Down
- Occupation: Dentist
- Height: 5 ft 11 in (180 cm)

Sport
- Football Position: Centre half forward
- Hurling Position: Centre half forward
Clubs
- Years: Club
- Carryduff (F); Ballycran (H)
Club titles
| | Football | Hurling |
| Down titles | 1 | 8 |
| Ulster titles | 0 | 1 |
| All-Ireland titles | 0 | 0 |
College titles
- Sigerson titles: 1
Inter-county
- Years: County
- 1981–1997 1985–1993: Down (F); Down (H)
Inter-county titles
| | Football | Hurling |
| Ulster Titles | 3 | 1 |
| All-Ireland Titles | 2 | 0 |
| League titles | 1 | 2 (Div 3) |
| All-Stars | 3 | 0 |

Greg Blaney is an Irish dual player who played Gaelic football and hurling for Down in the 1980s and 1990s. He was part of the Down team that won the All-Ireland Senior Football Championship in 1991 and 1994. Blaney won three Ulster Senior Football Championships and a National League title with Down and won three All Star awards during his career. He also had a distinguished underage career with the county - winning Ulster Minor, Ulster Under 21 and All-Ireland Under 21 Football Championship medals.

In football, he usually played at centre half forward. He was a brilliant reader of the game. He was renowned for his vision, ball-winning and play-making abilities. His excellent passing skills set up countless chances for teammates. His understanding with Down corner forward Mickey Linden has been described as "near telepathic". It has been said that he made the Down "attack tick with his shrewd play and inventiveness". Blaney was also able to score himself.

Blaney is a legend in Down GAA circles, and is known as one of the county's best ever footballers. In 2009 to mark the 125th anniversary of the Gaelic Athletic Association he was named by The Irish News as one of the all-time best 125 footballers from Ulster.

As a hurler with Down, Blaney won Ulster Minor and Ulster Senior Hurling Championship medals.

== Background ==
Blaney is from Kircubbin in the Ards Peninsula, County Down, where hurling is popular. In fact there is no club where football is even available in the ards, with all 3 being famed clubs where hurling is the only game played. He however is a member of the Blaney family, a Gaelic Games family in county Down. Keeping with his family traditions, Blaney attended school at St Colman's College in Newry, a gaelic football institution known Ireland-wide. This was the beginning of his footballing career, one which he later enhanced whilst attending Queen's University Belfast.

His father Seán captained Armagh to Ulster Minor and All-Ireland Minor Football Championship glory in 1949.

He has six brothers and one sister.He is married with six children and currently lives in Belfast.

== Football career ==
=== Club ===
Blaney's club is Ballycran. He played club football for a period with Carryduff as Ballycran had no football team. He won many underage honours with Ballycran including a Feile na nGael Hurling and played in the National Feile in Limerick. He won numerous Down Senior Hurling Championships alongside his brothers and childhood friends. Ballycran started a football team winning Down ACFL Division 4 and progressing into Division 3. It was as a Ballycran footballer that he won the All-Ireland in 1991 with Down. While with Carryduff, his first year playing for the club's Senior team was 1978 at the age of only 15. He helped the club win the Down Junior Football Championship in 1986.

=== Inter-county ===
Blaney played for the Down Minor team for three years and won the Ulster Minor Football Championship with them in 1977 & 1979. In 1979 at the age of just 16, he was part of the Down Under 21 team that won the Ulster Under 21 and All-Ireland Under 21 Football Championships.

Blaney joined the Down Senior panel in 1981. That year, while only 18 years old, he won his first Ulster Senior Football Championship medal with the county. Two years later he helped Down win the National Football League. He also received an All Star award for his performances that year. Blaney and Down reached the 1986 Ulster final, but were beaten by Tyrone.

In 1991 Down again won the Ulster Championship, beating Donegal in the decider. Down defeated Kerry in the All-Ireland semi-final, before beating Meath in the All-Ireland final. The success was Down's first All-Ireland Senior Football Championship title since 1968. Blaney also won a second All-Star that year.

Blaney won a third Ulster Championship medal with Down in 1994. Victories over Cork in the All-Ireland semi-final and Dublin in the final gave Blaney another All-Ireland Senior medal. Once again he was honoured for hs performances that year with an All-Star.

Blaney lined out in another Ulster final two years later, but Down lost to Tyrone. He retired from inter-county football in 1997. Blaney is one of a couple of players that have won Ulster Senior Hurling and Football

=== School/college ===
Between Blaney's 1st year in 1974 and last in 1981, the team went undefeated through league and knockout stages in the various age category competitions. Winning Dalton Cup(74/75)(Blaney captain), Corn na nOg(76/77), Rannefast(78/79) and MacRory Cup(1981). In 1981, having qualified for the then only All-Ireland college competition, the Hogan Cup, but with the age disparity between Ulster's MacRory (U18 1/2) and the other 3 provinces, Blaney and half a dozen colleagues from this undefeated team were deemed ineligible for the Hogan Cup (U18).

Blaney's honours while at St. Colman's included helping the school win three MacRory Cups (1978, 1979 and 1981). In 1978 they went on to reach the Hogan Cup final, but they were beaten by St. Jarlath's College, Tuam. In 1949, St. Colman's were captained by Greg's father Sean Blaney, who also captained them to success in 1950 - a feat only equalled by Dermot McNicholl (1983 and 1984). In 1981 final, the captain of the winning St. Colman's team was none other than Greg Blaney, son of Sean.

Sean and Greg are the only father/son combination to captain winning MacRory Cup teams.

As a fresher, Blaney was a top-scorer when Queen's University Belfast won the Sigerson Cup in 1982. He also won the Ryan Cup on two occasions with QUB (1984 and 1985). In 1999, he was named a "Sporting Great" of the university. He is also a patron of QUB's GAA academy.

=== Province ===
Blaney played for Ulster on many occasions. He won the Railway Cup five times with the province (between 1983 and 1995).

=== International ===
Blaney played Compromise rules football for Ireland against Australia in 1984, 1986, 1987 and 1990.

== Hurling career ==
=== Club ===
Blaney's club is Ballycran, and he played club football for a period with Carryduff as Ballycran had no football team. He won many underage honours with Ballycran including a Feile na nGael Hurling and played in the National Feile in Limerick. He won numerous Down Senior Hurling Championships alongside his brothers and childhood friends. Ballycran started a football team winning Down ACFL Division 4 and progressing into Division 3. It was as a Ballycran footballer that he won the All-Ireland in 1991 with Down. Blaney played in Antrim Senior Hurling League Division 1 with Ballycran in an era where no quarter was given or asked against teams such as Cushendall, Loughgiel, Ballycastle and fierce local rivals Ballygalget and Portaferry.

=== Inter-county ===
Blaney represented Down hurlers at Minor, Under 21 and Senior level. In 1978 he won an Ulster Minor Hurling Championship medal with the county.

He was part of the Down side that won the 1992 Ulster Senior Hurling Championship - the county's first since 1941.

== After retiring ==
Blaney served as a selector with the Down Senior football team when former teammate Paddy O'Rourke was manager. He was appointed to the role in July 2002. In 2003 Down reached the Ulster final, where they faced Tyrone.

== Honours ==
=== Club ===
There are 7 available Down All-County Senior League Medals Available - 3 in hurling and 4 in football. Blaney has a record number of league medals, a feat that may never be equalled. Blaney has won all medals, save for the Division 1 ACFL. He has won the following:

- Down ACHL Division 1 Hurling League
- Down ACHL Division 2 Hurling League
- Down ACHL Division 3 Hurling League
- Down Junior Football Championship (1) 1986
- Down AFL Division 4 Football League (1) 1990
- Down AFL Division 3 Football League (1) 1980
- Down AFL Division 2 Football League (1) 198?
- Ulster Senior Club Hurling Championship (1) 1993
- Down Senior Hurling Championship (8) 1980 1984 1985 1986 1987 1993 1994 1995

=== Inter-county ===
==== Senior ====
- All-Ireland Senior Football Championship (2) 1991 1994
- National Football League Division 1 (1) 1983
- National Football League Division 2 (2) 1982 1988
- Ulster Senior Football Championship (3) 1981 1991 1994
- Dr McKenna Cup (4) 1987 1989 1992 1996
- Ulster Senior Hurling Championship (1) 1992
- National Hurling League Division 3 (2) 1987 1989

==== Under-21 ====
- All-Ireland Under-21 Football Championship (1) 1979
- Ulster Under-21 Football Championship (1) 1979
- Ulster Under-21 Hurling Championship (1) 1983

==== Minor ====
- Ulster Minor Football Championship (2)1977 1979
- Ulster Minor Hurling Championship (1) 1978

=== School/college ===
- Sigerson Cup (1) 1982
- Ryan Cup (1) 1982
- MacRory Cup (1) 1978 1979 1981

=== Province ===
- Railway Cup (6) 1983 1984 1989 1991 1992 1995

=== Ireland ===
- International Rules (1) 1986

=== Individual ===
- All Star (3) 1983 1991 1994
- All star (10) Replacement (1981, 1984,1985, 1986, 1988, 1989, 1999, 1992, 1993, 1996)
- Irish News Ulster All-Stars (18) 1981, 82, 83, 84, 85, 86, 87, 88, 89, 90, 91, 92, 93, 94, 96, 97, 98, 99
- Ulster GAA Personality of the year (4) 1990, 1991, 1994, 1996
