= Dermot Hannafin =

Irish Gaelic footballer

Dermot Hanifin
Personal information
- Born: Castleisland, County Kerry

Sport
- Sport: Gaelic football
- Position: Midfield
Club
- Years: Club
- 1970s-1990s: Castleisland Desmonds
Club titles
- Kerry titles: 8
- Munster titles: 2
- All-Ireland Titles: 1
Inter-county
Years	County	Apps (scores)
1985-1993	Kerry	7 (1-01)
Inter-county titles
- Munster titles: 1
- All-Irelands: 1
- NFL: 3

Dermot Hanifin (born in Castleisland, County Kerry) is a former Irish sportsperson. He played Gaelic football with his local club Castleisland Desmonds and was a member of the Kerry senior inter-county team from 1985 until 1993. His father, also Dermot, played with Kerry during the 1950s.

== Army career ==
Hannafin is an officer in the Irish Army. His current rank is Lieutenant Colonel and is based in the Curragh Camp the main training centre for the Irish Defence Forces.

== Playing career ==
=== Club ===
Hanifin played his club football with his local Castleisland Desmonds club and enjoyed much success. He won a number of county club championship titles with Castleisland throughout the 1980s and 1990s. These victories allowed the club to represent the county in the provincial club championship. A 2-6 to 0-9 defeat of the famous St. Finbarr's club gave Hanifin a Munster club winners' medal. He later lined out in Croke Park for the All-Ireland final against St. Vincents of Dublin. In one of the most dramatic endings ever a fifty-eighth minute goal gave Castleisland a 2-2 to 0-7 victory. The win gave Hanifin an All-Ireland club winners' medal.

Hanifin collected a second consecutive Munster club winners' medal in 1985 as the mighty 'Barr's' were defeated for the second consecutive year. Castleisland later qualified for another All-Ireland final. This time Burren provided the opposition and the game was another close affair. A second-half goal secured the title for Burran as Hanifin's side were defeated by 1-10 to 1-6.

=== Intercounty ===
Hanifin also played with Kerry during the mid-1980s and early 1990s. He was part of the team that won Munster & All Ireland Championships in 1986 a year that would turn out to be Kerry's last All Ireland for 11 years.
