= Mick Holden =

Irish hurler and Gaelic footballer

Personal information
- Native name: Mícheál Ó hOláin (Irish)
- Born: 3 October 1954 Dublin, Ireland
- Died: 26 July 2007 (aged 52) Dublin, Ireland
- Height: 6 ft 0 in (183 cm)

Sport
- Sport: Gaelic football
- Position: Full-back
Club
- Years: Club
- Cuala
Club titles
- Dublin titles: 0
Inter-county
- Years: County
- 1979-1985: Dublin
Inter-county titles
- Leinster titles: 4
- All-Irelands: 1
- NFL: 0
- All Stars: 0

Mick Holden (3 October 1954 – 26 September 2007) was a Gaelic footballer and hurler for Dublin and Cuala CLG.

== Playing career ==
Holden was on the 1983 All-Ireland winning Dublin side that defeated Galway by a scoreline of 1–10 to 1–8. He also played with the Dublin hurlers and won the Railway Cup with Leinster in 1979. Six years later, he became one of the few players to win the Railway Cup in both codes, when he was a member of the victorious Leinster football panel.

== Death ==
Holden died suddenly on the morning of 26 September 2007.
