= Brett Stephens =

Australian rules footballer, born 1961

Personal information
- Full name: Brett Alexander Stephens
- Born: 20 February 1961 (age 65)
- Original team: Croydon / East Perth
- Height: 190 cm (6 ft 3 in)
- Weight: 90 kg (198 lb)

Playing career^{1}
Years	Club	Games (Goals)
1985-1986	East Perth	38 (100)
1987–1993	Fitzroy	133 (52)
Total		171 (152)
- ^{1} Playing statistics correct to the end of 1993.

Brett Alexander "Moose" Stephens (born 20 February 1961) is a former Australian rules footballer who played for Fitzroy Football Club in the Victorian and Australian Football Leagues (VFL and AFL) and currently a performance coach for world class athletes, working with pro tennis players, golfers and surfers.

== Football career ==
Stephens was a key position player originally from Croydon, Victoria, and had stints at VFL clubs Essendon and Sydney, Tasmanian Football League (TFL) club North Hobart, and Western Australian Football League's East Perth Football Club before his recruitment by Fitzroy.

Coach David Parkin gave the mature-age recruit Stephens his debut in 1987 at the age of 26, and he rewarded him with consistent performances. In Fitzroy's best and fairest, he finished 2nd on two occasions. He retired in 1993 with 133 games and 54 goals in a solid career. He represented Australia in International rules against Ireland and captained Victoria against Queensland in State of Origin.

== Post-football career ==
After his retirement, Stephens became a sports coach in both the mental and physical training sectors, fitness coaching Pete Sampras, Mark Philippoussis and his eventual wife, Zimbabwean tennis player Cara Black.
