= Peter Foster (Australian rules footballer) =

Australian rules footballer

Personal information
- Born: 2 June 1960 (age 66); Colac, Victoria
- Original team: Coragulac (Hampden FL)
- Height: 189 cm (6 ft 2 in)
- Weight: 86 kg (190 lb)

Playing career^{1}
Years	Club	Games (Goals)
1980–1982	Fitzroy	7 (2)
1983–1993	Footscray	163 (56)
Total		170 (58)
- ^{1} Playing statistics correct to the end of 1993.

Career highlights
- Charles Sutton Medal: 1990

Peter Foster (born 2 June 1960) is a former Australian rules footballer who represented Fitzroy and Footscray in the Australian Football League.

Foster had played just four games with Footscray when in 1984, after a heavy loss to Melbourne, coach Mick Malthouse decided to try him at centre half-back for the match against Collingwood. He became a mainstay in that position for the rest of his career.

Foster finished equal 5th in the 1988 Brownlow Medal and won Footscray's best and fairest award in 1990.

His son, Jayden Foster, was selected by Carlton in the 2014 AFL Draft, coincidentally by his father's old coach Mick Malthouse.
