= 1994 All-Ireland Senior Football Championship =

Football championship

Championship details
- Dates: 15 May 1994 – 18 September 1994
- Teams: 32

All-Ireland Champions
- Winning team: Down (5th win)
- Captain: D. J. Kane
- Manager: Pete McGrath

All-Ireland Finalists
- Losing team: Dublin
- Captain: John O'Leary
- Manager: Pat O'Neill

Provincial Champions
- Munster: Cork
- Leinster: Dublin
- Ulster: Down
- Connacht: Leitrim

Championship statistics
- No. matches played: 34
- Top Scorer: Charlie Redmond (4–30)
- Player of the Year: Mickey Linden

The 1994 Bank of Ireland All-Ireland Senior Football Championship was the 108th staging of the All-Ireland Senior Football Championship, the Gaelic Athletic Association's premier inter-county Gaelic football tournament. The championship began on 15 May 1994 and ended on 18 September 1994.

Derry entered the championship as the defending champions, however, they were defeated by Down in the Ulster quarter-final in what is regarded as one of the greatest games of all time.

On 18 September 1994, Down won the championship following a 1–12 to 0–13 defeat of Dublin in the All-Ireland final. This was their fifth All-Ireland title and their first in three championship seasons.

Dublin's Charlie Redmond was the championship's top scorer. Down's Mickey Linden was the choice for Texaco Footballer of the Year.

== Provincial championships ==
=== Connacht Senior Football Championship ===
Quarter-finals

5 June 1994 Quarter-final	Roscommon	0–12 – 1–10	Leitrim	Dr. Hyde Park, Roscommon
	D Duggan 0–6, D Connellan 0–3,		A Rooney 0–5, G Dugdale 1–0, J Ward 0–2, L Conlon 0–2, D Darcy 0–1.	Attendance: 11,408; Referee: B White (Wexford)

5 June 1994 Quarter-final	London	0–6 – 2–21	Galway	Emerald GAA Grounds, Ruislip
	N Harrington 0–2, V Dowd 0–1, E Prenter 0–1, J Landy 0–1, O Murphy 0–1.		F O'Neill 1–9, S Conlon 1–0, M Donnellan 0–2, Ja Fallon 0–2, K Walsh 0–2, V Daly 0–2, A Mac Carthaigh 0–1, N Finnegan 0–1, F Gavin 0–1, S Óg de Paor 0–1.	Attendance: 800

Semi-finals

26 June 1994 Semi-final	Mayo	2–18 – 1–5	Sligo	McHale Park, Castlebar
	K O'Neill 1–7, L McHale 1–1, K lydon 0–3, R Goulding 0–3, K McDonnell 0–1, P Butler 0–1, P Fallon 0–1, K Staunton 0–1.		M McGrath 1–3, T Deignan 0–1, F Feeney 0–1.	Attendance: 6,291; Referee: M Curley (Galway)

3 July 1994 Semi-final	Leitrim	0–9 – 1–6	Galway	Páirc Sheáin Mhic Dhiarmada, Carrick-on-Shannon
	G Dugdale 0–3, A Rooney 0–2, P Kieran 0–2, D Darcy 0–1, P Donoghue 0–1.		C McGauran 1–1, F O'Neill 0–2, Ja Fallon 0–2, M Donnellan 0–1.	Attendance: 10,042; Referee: S McHale (Mayo)

10 July 1994 Semi-final replay	Galway	0–10 – 0–11	Leitrim	Tuam Stadium, Tuam
	S Walsh 0–3, K Walsh 0–2, F O'Neill 0–2, Ja Fallon 0–1, V Daly 0–1.		C McGlynn 0–2, P Kenny 0–2, A Rooney 0–2, B Breen 0–2, D Darcy 0–1, G Dugdale 0–1, P Kieran 0–1.	Attendance: 7,074; Referee: S McHale (Mayo)

Final

24 July 1994 Final	Leitrim	0–12 – 2–4	Mayo	Dr. Hyde Park, Roscommon
	A Rooney 0–4, L Conlon 0–2, D Darcy 0–2, M Quinn 0–2, P Kenny 0–1, P Kieran 0–1.	Report	K Staunton 1–0, P Fallon 1–0, Golding 0–2, K McDonnell 0–1, K O'Neill 0–1.	Attendance: 18,271; Referee: M Curley (Galway)

=== Leinster Senior Football Championship ===
Preliminary round

22 May 1994 Preliminary round	Wicklow	0–12 – 1–9	Offaly	Aughrim Park, Aughrim
	C Daye 0–5, K O'Brien 0–3, F Daly 0–2, T Doyle 0–1, P Allen 0–1.		V Claffey 0–5, P Brady 1–1, J Kenny 0–1, P Dunne 0–1, S Grennan 0–1.	Attendance: 6,000; Referee: J Woods (Dublin)

28 May 1994 Preliminary round replay	Offaly	3–11 – 0–14	Wicklow	O'Connor Park, Tullamore
	V Claffey 1–4, P Brady 0–5, P Moran 1–0, J Stewart 1–0, S Grennan 0–1, P Dunne 0–1.		C Daye 0–6, A O'Sullivan 0–3, T Doyle 0–3, K Cunningham 0–2.	Attendance: 2,500; Referee: P Casserly (Meath)

29 May 1994 Preliminary round	Westmeath	1–9 – 0–13	Louth	Páirc Ciaran, Athlone
	G Heavin 1–1, J Fleming 0–2, L Giles 0–2, M Staunton 0–2, J Cooney 0–1, A Collins 0–1.		S White 0–8, C Kelly 0–3, A Doherty 0–1, O McDonnell 0–1.	Referee: T Howard (Kildare)

29 May 1994 Preliminary round	Laois	4-15– 2–4	Longford	O'Moore Park, Portlaoise
	D Delaney 1–4, L Turley 1–4, M Lawlor 1–3, N Roe 1–1, H Emerson 0–2, P Roe 0–1.		D Barry 1–0, R Culhane 1–0, A O'Brien 0–2, P Farrell 0–1, C Kenny 0–1.	Referee: P Power (Dublin)

Quarter-finals

12 June 1994 Quarter-final	Meath	0–20 – 2–10	Laois	Páirc Tailteann, Navan
	T Giles 0–6, T Dowd 0–4, B Flynn 0–3, J McGuinness 0–3, C Brady 0–2, G Geraghty 0–1, J Devine 0–1.		L Turley 1–1, D Delaney 0–4, N Rowe 1–0, M Lawlor 0–1, Martin Dempsey 0–1, T Maher 0–1, G Doyle 0–1, T Bowe 0–1.	Referee: S Prior (Leitrim)

12 June 1994 Quarter-final	Offaly	0–8 – 0–10	Wexford	O'Connor Park, Tullamore
	V Claffey 0–4, P Brady 0–2, S Grennan 0–1, M Keenaghan 0–1.		B Dodd 0–4, S Doran 0–3, J Byrne 0–1, N Darcy 0–1, S Berry 0–1.	Attendance: 4,500; Referee: P O'Toole (Longford)

18 June 1994 Quarter-final	Dublin	0–11 – 0–11	Kildare	Croke Park, Dublin
	C Redmond 0–8, V Murphy 0–1, J Sheedy 0–1, D Farrell 0–1.		G Dunne 0–4, D O'Connell 0–2, N Buckley 0–2, N Donlon 0–1, M Lynch 0–1, K Doyle 0–1.	Referee: P Russell (Tipperary)

19 June 1994 Quarter-final	Louth	3–19 – 0–11	Carlow	Drogheda Park, Drogheda
	A Doherty 2–3, P Butterly 1–3, C Kelly 0–4, S White 0–4, G Curran 0–3, E Judge 0–1, O McDonnell 0–1.		J Nevin 0–4, G Ware 0–3, J Hayden 0–2, A Keating 0–1, W Quinlan 0–1.

2 July 1994 Quarter-final replay	Dublin	1–14 – 1–9	Kildare	Croke Park, Dublin
	C Redmond 1–4, M Deegan 0–2, J Sheedy 0–2, B Stynes 0–1, P Bealin 0–1, N Guiden 0–1, D Farrell 0–1, P Clarke 0–1, M Galvin 0–1.		N Buckley 1–6, D Kerrigan 0–1, M Lynch 0–1, K Doyle 0–1.	Referee: P Russell (Tipperary)

Semi-finals

3 July 1994 Semi-final	Meath	4–14 – 2–6	Wexford	Croke Park, Dublin
	B Stafford 1–3, D Beggy 1–1, J Devine 1–1, T Dowd 1–0, T Giles 0–2, B Flynn 0–2, J McGuinness 0–2, S Kelly 0–1, B Reilly 0–1, C O'Rourke 0–1.		B Dodd 0–5, T Kavanagh 1–0, N Darcy 1–0, C Roche 0–1.	Attendance: 11,235; Referee: P Casserly (Westmeath)

10 July 1994 Semi-final	Dublin	1–15 – 1–8	Louth	Croke Park, Dublin
	C Redmond 1–4, M Galvin 0–5, D Farrell 0–2, N Guiden 0–2, B Stynes 0–1, P Gilroy 0–1.		E Judge 1–1, P Butterly 0–2, C Kelly 0–2, F Murphy 0–2, S White 0–1.	Attendance: 22,274; Referee: B White (Wexford)

Final

31 July 1994 Final	Dublin	1–9 – 1–8	Meath	Croke Park, Dublin
	C Redmond 1–4, B Stynes 0–2, N Guiden 0–1, D Farrell 0–1, P Clarke 0–1.		G Geraghty 1–2, B Reilly 0–1, J McGuinness 0–1, C O'Rourke 0–1, B Flynn 0–1, T Dowd 0–1, PJ Gillic 0–1.	Attendance: 50,172; Referee: B White (Wexford)

=== Munster Senior Football Championship ===
Quarter-finals

15 May 1994 Quarter-final	Clare	0–13 – 2–8	Tipperary	Cusack Park, Ennis
	A O'Keeffe 0–9, M Thynne 0–1, T Morrissey 0–1, O O'Dwyer 0–1, F McInerney 0–1.		P Lambert 2–5, B Cummins 0–2, D Foley 0–1.	Referee: M. O'Sullivan (Kerry)

22 May 1994 Quarter-final	Kerry	2–19 – 0–8	Limerick	Fitzgerald Stadium, Killarney
	S Geaney 1–2, P Laide 1–2, M Fitzgerald 0–5, B Driscoll 0–2, S Moynihan 0–2, N O'Mahony 0–2, B O'Shea 0–1, E Breen 0–1, D Ó Sé 0–1, T Fleming 0–1.		T Fitzgerald 0–2, J Quane 0–1, T Cummins 0–1, PJ Garvey 0–1, C McGill 0–1, J O'Donovan 0–1.	Referee: S O'Keeffe (Cork)

Semi-finals

26 June 1994 Semi-final	Cork	1–13 – 2–8	Kerry	Páirc Uí Chaoimh, Cork
	C Corkery 0–8, S O'Brien 1–0, T McCarthy 0–2, L Tompkins 0–1, M O'Sullivan 0–1, J Kavanagh 0–1.		M Fitzgerald 1–3, S Geaney 1–0, T Fleming 0–2, E O'Driscoll 0–2, L Flaherty 0–1.	Attendance: 26,884; Referee: P Russell (Tipperary)

26 June 1994 Semi-final	Tipperary	5–14 – 0–15	Waterford	Semple Stadium, Thurles
	P Lambert 2–3, J Costello 1–2, E Maher 1–0, B Burke 1–0, B Cummins 0–3, D Hogan 0–2, D Foley 0–2, C Coen 0–1, M Sheehan 0–1.		P Queally 0–3, J Maher 0–3, P Ferncombe 0–3, L Dalton 0–2, D Wyse 0–2, O O'Brien 0–1, T Gough 0–1.	Referee: W O'Mahony (Limerick)

Final

24 July 1994 Final	Cork	2–19 – 3–9	Tipperary	Páirc Uí Chaoimh, Cork
	C Corkery 0–9, J O'Driscoll 1–2, S Calnan 1–0, D Culloty 0–2, D Davis 0–2, J Kavanagh 0–2, L Tompkins 0–1, S O'Brien 0–1.		J Costello 1–2, P Lambert 0–5, D Hogan 1–0, D Foley 1–0, B Cummins 0–2.	Attendance: 13,118; Referee: W O'Mahony (Limerick)

=== Ulster Senior Football Championship ===
Preliminary round

15 May 1994 Preliminary round	Armagh	1–6 – 0–6	Fermanagh	Athletic Grounds, Armagh
	G Houlahan 1–0, D Marsden 0–3, C O'Rourke 0–1, D Mackin 0–1, J McConville 0–1.		R Gallagher 0–4, C McCreesh 0–2.	Referee: P McEneaney (Monaghan)

Quarter-finals

22 May 1994 Quarter-final	Cavan	1–12 – 3–10	Monaghan	Breffni Park, Cavan
	P Reilly 1–0, R Carolan 0–6, F Cahill 0–3, D O;Reilly 0–1, T Smithy 0–1, A Lambe 0–1.		D Smyth 1–4, M Slowey 0–4, G Flanagan 1–0, S McGinnity 1–0, F McEneaney 0–1, R McCarron 0–1.	Referee: D Campbell (Fermanagh)

29 May 1994 Quarter-final	Derry	1–12 – 1–14	Down	Celtic Park, Derry
	F McCusker 1–0, E Gormley 0–3, A Tohill 0–3, B McCormack 0–2, J Brolly 0–2, E Burns 0–1, D Heaney 0–1.		M Linden 0–5, G McCartan 0–5, C McCabe 1–0, J McCartan 0–2, A Farrell 0–1.	Referee: T Sugrue (Kerry)

5 June 1994 Quarter-final	Antrim	1–9 – 1–12	Donegal	Casement Park, Belfast
	C Heatley 1–5, J Kennedy 0–2, D Armstrong 0–1, A Donnelly 0–1.		D Bonner 0–5, T Boyle 1–1, M McHugh 0–2, N Hegarty 0–1, B McGowan 0–1, A Molloy 0–1, M Boyle 0–1.	Referee: J Curran (Tyrone)

12 June 1994 Quarter-final	Tyrone	3–10 – 1–10	Armagh	Healy Park, Omagh
	P Canavan 1–4, P Donaghy 1–2, S Lawn 1–0, A Cush 0–2, B Gormley 0–1, M McGleenan 0–1.		D Marsden 1–6, J Grinley 0–1, N Smith 0–1, J Rafferty 0–1, G Houlahan 0–1.	Referee: T McDermott (Cavan)

Semi-finals

19 June 1994 Semi-final	Down	0–14 – 0–8	Monaghan	Athletic Grounds, Armagh
	G Mason 0–6, M Linden 0–3, G McCartan 0–2, E Burns 0–1, C Deegan 0–1, J McCartan 0–1.		D Smyth 0–3, G Hoey 0–2, M Slowey 0–2, P McShane 0–1.	Referee: J Curran (Tyrone)

26 June 1994 Semi-final	Tyrone	1–15 – 0–10	Donegal	Breffni Park, Cavan
	Peter Canavan 0–6, A Cush 0–4, S Lawn 1–0, P Donaghy 0–1, E McCaffrey 0–1, B Gormley 0–1, C Loughran 0–1, A Kilpatrick 0–1.		D Bonner 0–4, T Boyle 0–3, J McHugh 0–2, M Boyle 0–1.	Referee: P McEneaney (Monaghan)

Final

17 July 1994 Final	Down	1–17 – 1–11	Tyrone	St. Tiernach's Park, Clones
	R Carr 1–4, G Mason 0–5, M Linden 0–3, P Higgins 0–1, E Burns 0–1, DJ Kane 0–1, G McCartan 0–1, G Blaney 0–1.		P Canavan 0–7, A Cush 1–1, B Gormley 0–2, S Lawn 0–1.	Attendance: 31,000; Referee: T McDermott (Cavan)

== All-Ireland Senior Football Championship ==
Semi-finals

14 August 1994 Semi-final	Down	1–13 – 0–11	Cork	Croke Park, Dublin
	G Mason 0–6, A Farrell 1–2, G McCartan 0–2, C Deegan 0–1, R Carr 0–1, M Linden 0–1.		C Corkery 0–7, S Calnan 0–2, L Tompkins 0–1, P McGrath 0–1.	Attendance: 43,787; Referee: B White (Wexford)

21 August 1994 Semi-final	Dublin	3–15 – 1–9	Leitrim	Croke Park, Dublin
	C Redmond 1–6, D Farrell 1–2, M Galvin 1–1, V Murphy 0–2, N Guiden 0–2, B Stynes 0–1, P Bealin 0–1.		C McGlynn 1–1, A Rooney 0–4, N Moran 0–1, D Darcy 0–1, P Kirean 0–1, B Breen 0–1.	Attendance: 52,606

Final

18 September 1994 Final	Down	1–12 – 0–13	Dublin	Croke Park, Dublin
	M Linden 0–4, J McCartan 1–0, R Carr 0–3, G Mason 0–3, G McCartan 0–1, A Farrell 0–1.		C Redmond 0–4, J Sheedy 0–2, P Curran 0–1, P Clarke 0–1, B Stynes 0–1, V Murphy 0–1, N Guiden 0–1, D Farrell 0–1, S Cahill 0–1.	Attendance: 58,684; Referee: T Sugrue (Kerry)

== Championship statistics ==
=== Miscellaneous ===
- On 29 May 1994, the Leinster Preliminary round game between Westmeath and Louth was the first game played in Pairc Chiaráin, Athlone for 70–80 years.
- Wexford beat Offaly for the first time since 1977.
- Leitrim qualified for the Connacht final for the first time since 1967. Their 0–12 to 2–4 defeat of Mayo gave them their first provincial title since 1927. It remains their only defeat of Mayo in a Connacht final and their last provincial decider victory.
- Down's All-Ireland final defeat of Dublin preserved their 100% record of victories in All-Ireland finals.
- There were a number of first-time championship meetings. Both All-Ireland semi-finals between Cork and Down and the later meeting of Dublin and Leitrim were first-time encounters.

=== Top scorers ===
Overall

Rank	Player	County	Tally	Total	Matches	Average
1	Charlie Redmond	Dublin	4–30	42	6	7.00
2	Peter Lambert	Tipperary	4–13	25	3	8.33
3	Colin Corkery	Cork	0–24	24	3	8.00

Single game

Rank	Player	County	Tally	Total	Opposition
1	Fergal O'Neill	Galway	1-09	12	London
2	Peter Lambert	Tipperary	2-05	11	Clare
3	Kevin O'Neill	Mayo	1-07	10	Sligo
4	Alan Doherty	Louth	2-03	9	Carlow
4	Peter Lambert	Tipperary	2-03	9	Waterford
4	Niall Buckley	Kildare	1-06	9	Dublin
4	Diarmaid Marsden	Armagh	1-06	9	Tyrone
4	Charlie Redmond	Dublin	1-06	9	Leitrim
4	Colin Corkery	Cork	0-09	9	Tipperary
4	Aidan O'Keeffe	Clare	0-09	9	Tipperary
