= Ray Hazley =

Irish Gaelic footballer

Personal information
- Born: Ireland

Sport
- Sport: Gaelic football
- Position: -
Club
- Years: Club
- St vincents
Inter-county
Years	County	Apps (scores)
	Dublin	?
Inter-county titles
- Leinster titles: Leinster
- All-Irelands: 1

Ray Hazley (born c. 1959) is a former Gaelic footballer who played for the Dublin county team.

He won an All-Ireland Senior Football Championship medal with Dublin in 1983, after being sent off in the final. He auctioned the medal in 2013.

He was PepsiCo president in Spain until 2010. He then became commercial vice president of the PepsiCo South Eastern Europe Region.
