= Paul John Buckley =

Dublin Gaelic footballer

P. J. Buckley
Personal information
- Native name: Pádraig Ioseph Ó Buachalla (Irish)
- Nickname: Bucko
- Born: 1956 (age 69–70) Dublin, Ireland

Sport
- Sport: Gaelic football
- Position: Half back
Club
- Years: Club
- ?–?: Erin's Isle
Inter-county
- Years: County
- ?–?: Dublin
Inter-county titles
- All-Irelands: 1
- All Stars: 1

Patrick Joseph Buckley aka P. J. Buckley (born c. 1956) is a former Gaelic footballer who played for the Dublin county team. Buckley won the All-Ireland Senior Football Championship with Dublin in 1983. He played his club football for the Erin's Isle club in Finglas, Dublin.

Buckley's sons Lorcan, Fintan represented their county in hurling and football ( His other son Kevin played Gaelic football and tennis.

Buckley is also an accomplished hurler, lining out for the Dubs at senior level. In 1983 he joined the Erin's Isle team that won the Dublin Senior Hurling Championship
