= Barney Rock =

Dublin Gaelic footballer and manager

Personal information
- Native name: Brian Mac Concharraige (Irish)
- Born: 10 January 1961 (age 65) Dublin, Ireland
- Occupation: Sales Manager
- Height: 1.8 m (5 ft 11 in)

Sport
- Sport: Gaelic football
- Position: Right half forward
Club
- Years: Club
- Ballymun Kickhams
Club titles
- Dublin titles: 2
Inter-county
Years	County	Apps (scores)
1980–1991	Dublin	99 (30–360)
Inter-county titles
- Leinster titles: 4
- All-Irelands: 1
- NFL: 1
- All Stars: 3

Barney Rock (born 10 January 1961) is a former Gaelic footballer and manager at club and inter-county level (he managed Westmeath in the mid-1990s).

== Biography ==
Born in Ballymun, but growing up in Glasnevin, Dublin, Rock attended St Kevins College, Ballygall.

He played Gaelic football with his local club Ballymun Kickhams and was a senior member of the Dublin county team from 1980 until 1991. He won the 1983 All-Ireland Senior Football Championship with Dublin in 1983 at Croke Park against Galway. Rock was also chosen to play in the first International Rules Series against Australia in 1984. Rock won an All Star for Dublin on three occasions, each in consecutive years 1983, 1984, 1985.

After hanging up his boots, Rock went on to manage both the Westmeath senior and under 21 teams from 1995 to 1997 and was managing Dublin GAA club St Sylvester's in 2000.

Rock was an unsuccessful candidate at the 1991 Dublin Corporation election for the Progressive Democrats. He stood for election to the local electoral area of Finglas on Dublin Corporation.

Rock's son, Dean, would later play for Dublin.
