= Craig Holden (footballer) =

Australian rules footballer (born 1957)

Personal information
- Born: 14 August 1957 (age 69); Western Australia
- Draft: No. 5, 1981 interstate draft
- Height: 178 cm (5 ft 10 in)
- Weight: 80 kg (176 lb)

Playing career^{1}
Years	Club	Games (Goals)
1976–1981	Swan Districts (WAFL)	98 (26)
1982–1983	North Melbourne (VFL)	29 (2)
1984–1988	Sydney Swans (VFL)	80 (22)
Total		207 (50)
- ^{1} Playing statistics correct to the end of 1988.

Career highlights
- WA State Team 1981, 1984, 1985, 1987; All Australian Team 1987; Jack Clarke Medal (Medallists Medal) 1975

Craig Holden (born 14 August 1957) is a former Australian rules footballer who played in the AFL for the Sydney Swans and North Melbourne Football Club and in the West Australian Football League (WAFL) playing for the Swan Districts Football Club.

After winning the Jack Clarke Medal (called the Medallists' Medal at the time) in 1975 playing for Swan Districts colts, he made his league debut in 1976.

In 1984 Holden played in the international hybrid game against Ireland, the series was remembered as being a particularly physical encounter, and Holden was grabbed by the throat by the umpire.

During his career Holden played a total of 211 senior games and was selected in the Swan Districts Team of the Century as an interchange player.

After retiring Craig Holden remained involved in Football and was the Sydney Swans Development Manager and a match committee member. He was honoured with life membership of the Sydney Swans in 2006.
