= Matthew Campbell (Australian footballer) =

Australian rules footballer, born 1964

Personal information
- Full name: Matthew Peter Campbell
- Born: 30 January 1964 (age 62)
- Original team: North Adelaide
- Draft: 1986 pre-draft selection
- Height: 188 cm (6 ft 2 in)
- Weight: 93 kg (205 lb)

Playing career^{1}
Years	Club	Games (Goals)
1983–1986	North Adelaide	100 (80)
1987–1993	Brisbane Bears	79 (28)
Total		179 (108)
- ^{1} Playing statistics correct to the end of 1993.

Matthew Peter Campbell (born 30 January 1964) is a former professional Australian rules footballer who notably played for the Brisbane Bears in the Australian Football League (AFL).

== Football career ==
Campbell was recruited from South Australian National Football League (SANFL) club North Adelaide. He made his senior VFL debut with the Brisbane Bears in their inaugural match in 1987. Campbell made a name for himself as a quick wingman, and went on to play 79 games for the club between 1987 and 1993, kicking 28 goals. His career highlights include being selected as goalkeeper in International Rules tests against Ireland in 1987 and 1990. Campbell was the last original Bear to cease playing with the club.

== Media career ==
Following his retirement from football, Campbell has worked primarily as a television sports commentator, particularly for Australian rules football, first with the Seven Network, then Fox Footy. Campbell has also performed as an MC at sporting events.

With the sudden death of friend and former colleague Clinton Grybas in early 2008, Campbell joined the Fox Sports regular AFL commentary team.

In the late 2000s, he became a spokesman for online Australian sports betting agency Sportsbet.
