= Noel McCaffrey =

Dublin Gaelic footballer

Personal information
- Born: Dublin, Ireland

Sport
- Sport: Gaelic football
- Position: Back
Club
- Years: Club
- ?–?: Clontarf
Inter-county
- Years: County
- ?–?: Dublin
Inter-county titles
- Leinster titles: ?
- All-Irelands: 0

Noel McCaffrey is a former Gaelic footballer who played for the Clontarf club and for the Dublin county team. Noel was awarded an All Star for his performances for Dublin in 1988.

He studied medicine and is now a lecturer in the School of Health and Human Performance in Dublin City University.

McCaffrey worked outside the University of Dublin as a director of Exwell medicine. He was a Sports Medicine Consultant to Cappagh Orthopaedic Hospital and a medical consultant to Riverdance.

He states his research interests are obesity, muscoskeletal injury in athletes, and exercise for special populations.

McCaffrey's son Jack and daughter Sarah would later play for Dublin too.
