= Joe McNally (Gaelic footballer) =

Dublin Gaelic footballer

Personal information
- Native name: Seosamh Mac an Fhailí (Irish)
- Nicknames: Big Joe, Smokey
- Born: Dublin

Sport
- Sport: Gaelic football
- Position: Goalkeeper, Midfield, Full Forward
Club
- Years: Club
- St Anne's
Inter-county
- Years: County
- 1983–1991, 1996: Dublin
Inter-county titles
- Leinster titles: Leinster Minor 2- 1981,1982 Leinster U/21 1- 1984 Leinster Senior 4- 1983, 1984, 1985, 1989
- All-Irelands: All Ireland Minor 1982 All Ireland Senior 1983 All Ireland Masters 2006
- NFL: 2 - 1987, 1991 Railway Cup, 1985, 1987
- All Stars: 1- 1983

Joe McNally (born c. 1964) is a former Gaelic footballer who played for the St Anne's club and at senior level for the Dublin county team. He was awarded an All Star in 1983 for his performances with Dublin. He won an All-Ireland Minor medal with Dublin as a goalkeeper in 1982 and a senior medal as a corner forward in 1983. He is the only player in the history of Gaelic football to win an All-Ireland Minor medal and Senior medal in successive years. The St Anne's man won titles for his club, county, province and country. A prolific goalscorer, he scored 26 goals for Dublin in league and championship.
