= John O'Leary (Gaelic footballer) =

Dublin Gaelic footballer

Personal information
- Native name: Seán Ó Laoire/Ó Laoghaire (Irish)
- Born: 1961 (age 64–65) Dublin, Ireland
- Occupation: Politician
- Height: 6 ft 1 in (1.85 m)

Sport
- Sport: Gaelic football
- Position: Goalkeeper
Club
- Years: Club
- ?–?: O'Dwyers GAA
Inter-county
Years	County	Apps (scores)
1980–1997	Dublin	70
Inter-county titles
- Leinster titles: 8
- All-Irelands: 2
- NFL: 3
- All Stars: 5

John O'Leary (born c. 1961) is a Dublin-born Gaelic footballer who played for the O'Dwyers club and at senior level for the Dublin county team. He is an area manager for Permanent TSB and in 2007 was a candidate for Fianna Fáil in the constituency of Dublin North. O'Leary has a biography of his sporting career with Dublin (co-written with Martin Breheny and published by Blackwater Press in 1997), entitled Back To The Hill.

== Playing career ==
His inter-county began with Dublin in 1978, where he was a member of the panel that won the 1978 Leinster Minor Football Championship and were beaten in the All-Ireland Minor Football Championship final to Mayo. He had only appeared as a substitute for Dublin in 1978 and he became the first choice goalkeeper for Dublin in 1979. This proved to be a successful year for him, as he went on to claim his second Leinster minor medal and his first all-Ireland minor medal with Dublin.

O'Leary made his championship debut for Dublin in 1980 against Offaly in the Leinster championship final. Dublin lost the game at Croke Park by 1–10 to 1–8 with O'Leary his first goal in a Dublin shirt against Offaly with a Matt Connor goal in front of a packed crowd of 50,276. This proved to be Dublins first loss in the Leinster championship since losing to Louth in 1973. This proved a less than satisfactory debut but 1980 also brought success to the O'Dwyer's man. He won his first and only Leinster U21 Football Championship in 1980 only to be defeated in the final to Cork.

1981 proved to be another unsuccessful year for O'Leary with Dublin being knocked out of the Leinster Senior Football Championship to Laois by 2–09 to 0–11 in Tullamore. O'Leary conceded two goals in the game to Tom Prendergast (penalty) and John Costello. In the previous round of the Leinster championship O'Leary made an amazing save from Wicklows Pat O'Byrne which proved the difference between the sides. He received the save of the season award for the save. 1982 proved to be another unsuccessful year in the blue jersey, with Dublin losing out to Offaly in a repeat of the 1980 Leinster final.

O'Leary won his first All-Ireland Senior Football Championship with Dublin in 1983. He got to exact his revenge on Offaly in the Leinster final by defeating them by 2–13 to 1–11. Matt O'Connor managed to repeat his goal scoring against O'Leary but it was enough to stop Dublin at Croke Park. Dublin went on to play Cork in the semi-final at Croke Park which finished on 2-11 a-piece. The replay proved to be a more one-sided affair, with Dublin winning the game by 4–15 to 2–10 at a packed (43,433) Páirc Uí Chaoimh. O'Leary then played in his first all-Ireland final at Croke Park in front of a crowd of 71,988. Dublin defeated Galway by 1–10 to 1–08 with O'Leary claiming his first all-Ireland senior medal.

After a very successful 1983, a lot was expected of the Dublin senior football team in 1984. O'Leary won the Leinster Senior Football Championship with a memorable win over rivals Meath in the final. O'Leary pulled off an amazing save against Wexford in the previous round which resulted in him receiving the save of the season award. After the Leinster final, Dublin met Tyrone in the semi-final. This game proved controversial as the Tyrone side tried to have their pre-match kickaround in front of Hill 16 where Dublin traditionally warm up before games at Croke Park. These attempts to unsettle the Dublin side were in vain as Dublin proved eventual winners by 2–11 to 0–8. The final in Croke Park against Kerry proved to be Dublins first championship loss in over two years. Despite a clean sheet by O'Leary in the game, Dublin lost by 0–14 to 1-06. O'Leary was awarded his first All Stars Award for Dublin and was also called up to the Ireland Compromise rules side for the first time.

In 1986 O'Leary won his first Railway Cup medal for Leinster as captain. In the championship Dublin were knocked out by rivals Meath in the final for the first time since 1964. O'Leary who was the Dublin captain in 1986, had managed to keep a clean sheet for the game but it wasn't enough to stop a 0–09 to 0–07 win over Dublin. In 1986 he toured with the Ireland compromise rules team in Australia.

By 1987, he returned to winning medals for Dublin by claiming his first ever National Football League medal with a memorable 1–11 to 0–11 win over rivals Kerry. Despite this sign of pre-championship form, Dublin lost out to bitter rivals Meath in their second consecutive Leinster final in Croke Park in July 1987. Meath won the game by 1–13 to 0–12 with Mattie McCabe scoring the goal against O'Leary. O'Leary captained the 1987 Ireland compromise rules team against Australia.

1988 was a disappointing year for Dublin and O'Leary, his side failed to retain their NFL title by losing in the final with a replay against Meath in a game that finished at 2–13 to 0–11. Dublin were knocked out of the Leinster championship by Meath during the same year and Dublins intense rivalry with Meath would continue to grow. The Leinster championship was returned to Dublin in 1989 with O'Leary exacting revenge against Meath for the NFL loss. Dublin won the Leinster final by 2–12 to 1–10 in Croke Park with Mattie McCabe scoring the goal against O'Leary once again. Dublin were then knocked out in the semifinal of the all-Ireland by Cork despite an early lead of 1–04 to 0-00. The game finished on a scoreline of 2–10 to 1-09.

Dublin had a comfortable win over Louth in their opening game in the 1990 Leinster Senior Football Championship with a 1–13 to 1–08 win in Drogheda. Dublin faced Wicklow in the semi-final and O'Leary claimed another clean sheet in Dublins 2–14 to 0–12 win. The Leinster final once again featured what was becoming the fiercest of rivalries between Dublin and their neighbours Meath. Dublin failed to retain their title and lost the game by a Colm O'Rourke goal, the game finished on a scoreline of 0–14 to 1–14.

1991 was to prove to be one of the most interesting years in the career of Dublin goalkeeper O'Leary. The year began with an NFL final win over Kildare by 1–09 to 0–10. After the NFL win, a lot was expected of Dublin for 1991. Dublin were drawn against their neighbours and rivals Meath in the first round. This was a worry for the Leinster council who were in financial trouble and this tie saw the possibility of Dublin going out in the first round with seasons worth of ticket sales over in one game. Dublin had been noted for their large attendances at championship games and a loss for Dublin would mean a loss of earnings for the Leinster council who were considering closing their headquarters due to financial difficulties. The opening game against Meath finished on a draw which proved great news for the Leinster council as the first game had an attendance of 51,144 and more would be expected for a replay. The game finished on a scoreline of 1–12 to 1–12 with Brian Stafford scoring the goal against O'Leary. The second game which had an attendance of 60,960 finished on a scoreline of 0-10 a-piece after 70 minutes and the game was forced into extra time. In extra-time David Beggy managed to beat O'Leary to score a goal but it proved irrelevant as Jack Sheedy scored a goal for Dublin and the game finished on all level at 1-11 a-piece. The third game had the highest attendance in the series with 63,730 packing Croke Park. The game also finished all-level after 70 minutes at 0–10 to 1–07 with Bernie Flynn scoring the goal. The game went into extra-time and finished at 1–14 to 2–11 with Colm Coyle scoring the goal for Meath. Once again a replay was needed to decide the outcome of the game. The GAA was losing popularity in Ireland at the time especially after the successes of the Ireland soccer team at the FIFA world cup in Italy and this series of draws would prove a great success story to revive the fortunes of the GAA. The final game in the series finished with Meath winning by a scoreline of 2–10 to 0–15. The game had an attendance of 60,543 and proved yet another dramatic game. In the dying minutes of the game, Dublin were winning the game by three points despite Dublin's Keith Barr missing a penalty. This win was turned in a matter of minutes with Kevin Foley scoring the equalising goal against O'Leary and the game finished with a spectacular point by David Beggy of Meath. Meath went on to retain the 1991 Leinster Senior Football Championship and were defeated by Down in the final and the first-round game against Dublin was often given as a reason for Meath for the all-Ireland loss due to fatigue.

1992 saw Dublin's return to Leinster glory with O'Leary winning his fifth medal. It would have been fitting for a Dublin Meath final once again but Meath had been defeated in the first round by Laois. Dublin defeated Kildare in the final by 1–13 to 0–10 with a clean sheet by O'Leary. Once again, like the Kerry game a few years before, O'Leary maintained a clean sheet in the final but it failed to materialise as a win with Donegal finishing the game on a high scoreline of 0–18 to 0–14.

O'Leary was appointed as captain of the Dublin senior football panel in 1993. He became by captaining Dublin to NFL glory against with revenge over the previous years all-Ireland winners Donegal in the final. Dublin then went on to claim the Leinster title with a win over Kildare in the final. Dublin had previously beaten Meath in the semi-final by 1–10 to 0–12. After a semi final win over Munster champions Clare Dublin went on to be defeated by Ulster opposition for the second year in a row. Derry defeated O'Leary's Dublin by 0–15 to 0–14 at Croke Park in the semi-final much to O'Learys disappointment after having successfully maintained five clean sheets in a row. This series of performances earned him his third all-star award.

In 1994 O'Leary continued as Dublin captain and claimed his second Leinster title in that role. This proved another clean sheet for him in a national final. Dublin then went on to retain their Leinster title by defeating Meath once again in the final. Dublin won by 1–09 to 1–08 in a close game with O'Leary conceding the goal to Graham Geraghty of Meath. After a semi final win over Connacht champions Leitrim Dublin went on to be defeated by Ulster opposition for the third year in a row. Dublin played Down in the final in a game that finished on 1–12 to 0–13 in Croke Park.

1995 was to prove another personal milestone in the football career of O'Leary. Dublin easily beat Meath in the Leinster final by 1–18 to 1-08 which paved the way for a semi final showdown with Cork. A clean sheet for O'Leary in the semi-final gave Dublin the win over Cork with great performance by Mick Galvin and Jason Sherlock. Dublin finally managed to beat Ulster opposition in the all-Ireland phase of the championship by beating Tyrone by 1–10 to 0–12. This was Dublin and O'Learys first all-Ireland since 1983 and being captain made it all the more special for him. He was then awarded his fifth and final all-star award for his performance with Dublin, most notably clean sheets in the semi-final and the final at Croke Park.

1996 was a much quieter year for O'Leary, the two in a row dream died in Croke Park during the Leinster final. It was typical of the history between the sides that Meath recovered from 1995's huge loss to beat the Dubs by 0–10 to 0-08. The following year Dublin met Meath in the first round of the championship and were beaten by 1–13 to 1–10 with Paul Bealin missing a penalty in the dying minutes of the game. O'Leary retired after the Meath game, after having played an incredible 70 consecutive championship matches in the championship between 1980 and 1997.His record of 70 consecutive appearances hasn't been replicated by any other GAA player let alone a Dublin player. In his impressive inter-county career he appeared in Croke Park on 47 occasions. Mattie McCabe of Meath was the most successful player against O'Leary, scoring a total of three goals. He conceded just 51 goals in his 70-game championship career for Dublin.

== Management career ==
He re-entered the inter-county scene as a Dublin team selector to Tommy Carr. When Carr lost his position as Dublin manager O'Leary took charge of his mother's native county Wicklow as the new senior football manager and later went on to manage Dublin senior ladies' football team in 2004. O'Leary was a part of the 2012 coaching team with Louth, where he trained the Louth goalkeepers and backs.

John was appointed as Director of Football at Fingal Ravens in 2020, where he Chairs the Football & Player Development Committee.

== Political career ==
In November 2006, it was announced that he would contest the 2007 general election for Fianna Fáil in the Dublin North constituency in place of retiring TD Jim Glennon.

At the 2007 general election, O'Leary was unsuccessful in his bid for a Dáil seat. He received 5,074 first preference votes giving him a 9.3% of the vote during his first election campaign. His two running mates Michael Kennedy and Darragh O'Brien were elected with help from O'Leary's transfer. Other 'celebrity' candidates, such as Graham Geraghty and Colm O'Gorman, were also unsuccessful.

== Honours ==
- In May 2020, the Irish Independent named O'Leary as one of the "dozens of brilliant players" who narrowly missed selection for its "Top 20 footballers in Ireland over the past 50 years".

== See also ==
- Fianna Fáil

Sporting positions
Preceded by Brian Mullins	Dublin Senior Football Captain; 1986	Succeeded by ?
Preceded by ?	Dublin Senior Football Captain; 1993–1996	Succeeded by Keith Barr
Achievements
Preceded by D. J. Kane (Down)	All-Ireland SFC winning captain 1995	Succeeded by Tommy Dowd (Meath)
