= Gerry Hargan =

Dublin Gaelic footballer

Personal information
- Born: Dublin, Ireland

Sport
- Sport: Gaelic football
- Position: Back
Club
- Years: Club
- Ballymun Kickhams
Club titles
- Dublin titles: 2
Inter-county
- Years: County
- 1982–1992: Dublin
Inter-county titles
- Leinster titles: 5
- All-Irelands: 1
- All Stars: 2

Gerry Hargan is a former Gaelic footballer who played for the Dublin county team. Hargan made his debut for Dublin in the National Football League against Kerry in Tralee.

Hargan won an All-Ireland Senior Football Championship medal for Dublin in 1983. He won his first Leinster Senior Football Championship title for Dublin in 1983 and went on to collect more in 1984, 1985, 1989 and 1992. He won a National Football League title with Dublin in 1987. His final game for Dublin was in 1992 when Dublin were defeated by Donegal in the All-Ireland final at Croke Park. Dublin lost the game by 0–18 to 0–14. Due to injury he could no longer play for the county. He received two All-Stars with Dublin and was captain in 1988.

Hargan has also had successes at club level, collecting two Dublin Senior Football Championship medals in 1982 and in 1985.
