= GAA GPA All Stars Awards =

Gaelic football award

- Awarded for: Excellence in Gaelic football and hurling
- Sponsored by: PwC
- Location: Convention Centre Dublin
- Country: Ireland
- Presented by: Gaelic Athletic Association/Gaelic Players Association
- First award: 1995
- Website: Broadcast partner

Television/radio coverage
- Network: RTÉ One
- Runtime: 51 minutes

The Gaelic Athletic Association–Gaelic Players' Association All Stars Awards (often known simply as the All Stars) are presented annually to the best player in each of the 15 playing positions in Gaelic football and hurling. Additionally, one person in each code is selected as Player of the Year.

The awards were instituted in 1971. Since 2011 they have been presented jointly by the Gaelic Athletic Association and the representative body for inter-county players, the Gaelic Players Association.

Each player who receives a nomination is given a medallion marking the milestone.

It is considered "the most coveted sporting award scheme in the country". Equivalent awards exist for ladies' football, rounders and camogie.

== History and procedure ==
Since the 1960s there had been a tradition of annually selecting the best player in each position, in football and hurling, to create a special team of the year. Between 1963 and 1967 these players received what was known as the Cú Chulainn award. In 1971 these awards were formalised into the annual GAA All Star Awards. In 2006 the Gaelic Players Association launched a parallel award scheme entitled the GPA Gaelic Team of the Year (often referred to as the GPA Awards). An annual award was also given by the GPA to the Footballer of the Year and the Hurler of the Year.

In 2011 it was announced that the GAA All Stars Awards, which had been sponsored in recent years by Vodafone, and the GPA Awards would merge under the sponsorship of car manufacturer Opel. The move announced by Christy Cooney saw the achievements of players recognised jointly for the first time in October 2011.

The All Stars team comprises the best player in each position, regardless of club or county affiliation. The composition of the All Star teams are decided on the basis of a shortlist compiled by a selection committee of sports journalists from the national media, while the overall winners are chosen by inter-county players themselves. The award is regarded by players as the highest accolade available to them, due to it being picked by their peers. The awards are presented at a gala banquet in November following the end of the Championship season. Both men's teams are honoured with a special holiday where they play an exhibition game. Since 1971 over 1,000 players have been honoured with All Stars Awards. Damien Martin of the Offaly hurling team was the first ever recipient of the award, while in 2004 Paul Galvin of the Kerry football team became the 1,000th winner of the award.

Carlow and Longford are the only counties in Ireland not to receive an award in either sport.

In September 2017 PwC became the new sponsors of the All Star Awards on a four-year deal, with the awards being renamed The PwC All-Stars.

== Winners ==
For a complete listing of all winners see the following articles:

- All Stars Footballer of the Year
- All Stars Hurler of the Year
- List of All Stars Awards winners (football)
- List of All Stars Awards winners (hurling)
- All-Time All Star Award (football)
- All-Time All Star Award (hurling)
- Ladies' Gaelic football All Stars Awards (Winners)
- Camogie All Stars Awards (Winners)
- Rounders All Stars Awards (Winners: Men / Women)

== Records ==
=== Brothers ===
Twenty three sets of brothers have won All Star Awards in hurling. They are:

- Colm, Conal and Cormac Bonnar of Tipperary
- Tom and Jim Cashman of Cork
- Andy and Martin Comerford of Kilkenny
- John and Joe Connolly of Galway
- Jimmy and Joe Cooney of Galway
- Ollie and Joe Canning of Galway
- Johnny, Billy and Joe Dooley of Offaly
- Colm and Tony Doran of Wexford
- Liam and Ger Fennelly of Kilkenny
- Pat, Ger and John Henderson of Kilkenny
- Eoin and Paul Kelly of Tipperary
- Brian and Frank Lohan of Clare
- Willie and Eddie O'Connor of Kilkenny
- Seán Óg and Setanta Ó hAilpín of Cork
- Aidan and Bobby Ryan of Tipperary
- Martin and John Quigley of Wexford
- Michael and Colin Fennelly of Kilkenny
- Dan Shanahan and Maurice Shanahan of Waterford
- Pádraic Maher and Ronan Maher of Tipperary
- Noel McGrath and John McGrath of Tipperary
- Tommy Walsh and Pádraig Walsh of Kilkenny
- Cathal Mannion and Pádraic Mannion of Galway
- Tom Morrissey and Dan Morrissey of Limerick
- Eoin Downey and Robert Downey of Cork

One set of twins have won All Star Awards in hurling:

- Jerry and Ben O'Connor of Cork

Thirteen sets of brothers have won All Star Awards in Gaelic football. They are:

- Matt and Richie Connor of Offaly
- Tomás and Liam Connor of Offaly
- Paul and Dermot Earley Snr of Roscommon
- Seán and Brendan Lowry of Offaly
- James and Martin McHugh of Donegal
- Mark and Ryan McHugh of Donegal
- Anthony and John McGurk of Derry
- Tom, Mick and Pat Spillane of Kerry
- Tomás, Darragh and Marc Ó Sé of Kerry
- Kenneth and Conor Mortimer of Mayo
- Alan and Bernard Brogan Jnr of Dublin
- Seán Cavanagh and Colm Cavanagh of Tyrone
- David Clifford and Paudie Clifford of Kerry

One set of brothers has won All Star Awards in hurling and football (with two different counties):

- Declan Carr won his hurling award while playing with Tipperary and Tommy Carr won his football award while playing with Dublin.

=== Father and son ===
Seventeen father and son pairings have won All Star Awards.

Thirteen of these have been in football. Of the thirteen, two fathers have each been followed by two sons, therefore a total of four father and son pairings:

- Bernard Brogan Snr, plus Alan Brogan and Bernard Brogan Jnr of Dublin.
- Martin McHugh, plus Mark McHugh and Ryan McHugh of Donegal.

The other nine father and son pairings are:

- Pat Reynolds and Paddy Reynolds of Meath.
- Dermot Earley Snr and Dermot Earley Jnr of Roscommon and Kildare.
- Liam O'Neill of Galway and Kevin O'Neill of Mayo.
- Frank McGuigan and Brian McGuigan of Tyrone.
- Tim Kennelly and Tadhg Kennelly of Kerry.
- Denis 'Ógie' Moran and David Moran of Kerry.
- Noel McCaffrey and Jack McCaffrey of Dublin.
- Barney Rock and Dean Rock of Dublin.
- Val Daly and John Daly of Galway.

There have been six hurling father and son pairings:

- Fan Larkin and Philly Larkin of Kilkenny.
- Richie Power Snr and Richie Power Jnr of Kilkenny.
- Ken Hogan and Brian Hogan of Tipperary.
- Tommy Quaid and Nickie Quaid of Limerick.
- Liam Keoghan and Martin Keoghan of Kilkenny.
- Joe Rabbitte and Jason Rabbitte of Galway.

=== Dual All Stars ===
One player, Ray Cummins of Cork, holds the unique record of winning a hurling and a football All Star in the same year (1971).

Three other players share the distinction of winning All Star awards in both hurling and football, but they did not win the accolades in the same year. These players are:

- Jimmy Barry-Murphy of Cork
- Brian Murphy of Cork
- Liam Currams of Offaly

== Players with most wins ==
Total wins	#	Name	County team	Code
11	1st	Henry Shefflin	Kilkenny	H
9	2nd	D. J. Carey	Kilkenny	H
9	2nd	Tommy Walsh	Kilkenny	H
9	2nd	Pat Spillane	Kerry	F
8	3rd	Colm Cooper	Kerry	F
7	4th	J. J. Delaney	Kilkenny	H
7	4th	T. J. Reid	Kilkenny	H
7	4th	Noel Skehan	Kilkenny	H
7	4th	Mikey Sheehy	Kerry	F
7	4th	Jimmy Barry-Murphy	Cork	F & H
7	4th	David Clifford	Kerry	F
6	5th	Pádraic Maher	Tipperary	H
6	5th	Eoin Kelly	Tipperary	H
6	5th	Stephen Cluxton	Dublin	F
6	5th	Nicky English	Tipperary	H
6	5th	Joe McKenna	Limerick	H
6	5th	Peter Canavan	Tyrone	F
6	5th	Jack O'Shea	Kerry	F
6	5th	Ger Power	Kerry	F
6	5th	Ciarán Kilkenny	Dublin	F
6	5th	Kyle Hayes	Limerick	H
5	6th	Lee Keegan	Mayo	F
5	6th	Brian Fenton	Dublin	F
5	6th	Daithí Burke	Galway	H
5	6th	Brendan Cummins	Tipperary	H
5	6th	Eddie Keher	Kilkenny	H
5	6th	Joe Hennessy	Kilkenny	H
5	6th	John Mullane	Waterford	H
5	6th	Pat Hartigan	Limerick	H
5	6th	Joe Canning	Galway	H
5	6th	Joe Cooney	Galway	H
5	6th	Pete Finnerty	Galway	H
5	6th	John Fenton	Cork	H
5	6th	Tony O'Sullivan	Cork	H
5	6th	Ray Cummins	Cork	F & H
5	6th	John Egan	Kerry	F
5	6th	John O'Keeffe	Kerry	F
5	6th	Páidí Ó Sé	Kerry	F
5	6th	Tomás Ó Sé	Kerry	F
5	6th	John O'Leary	Dublin	F
5	6th	Seán Cavanagh	Tyrone	F
5	6th	Diarmaid Byrnes	Limerick	H
5	6th	Gearóid Hegarty	Limerick	H

=== Unique achievements ===
Tommy Walsh of Kilkenny won nine consecutive hurling All Star Awards in a record five different positions. These were for playing at left corner back (1), at right half back (5), at left half back (1), at midfield (1) and at left half forward (1).

Henry Shefflin of Kilkenny holds the record for most All Star Awards in the one position with seven at centre-forward.

Brian Fenton and Brian Howard, both from Raheny and Dublin were the first midfield to be selected from one club.

Shortly after his 90th birthday, Mícheál Ó Muircheartaigh was awarded the only All Star of 2020. No further All Stars could be awarded as competition was suspended due to the COVID-19 pandemic and only completed that December.
