= David Niblock =

Cork Gaelic footballer

Personal information
- Native name: Daithí Niobloch (Irish)
- Born: 1981 (age 44–45) Cork, Ireland
- Occupation: Business acc. executive
- Height: 6 ft 4 in (193 cm)

Sport
- Sport: Gaelic football
- Position: Centre-forward
Club
- Years: Club
- 1999-2015: Nemo Rangers
Club titles
- Cork titles: 9
- Munster titles: 6
- All-Ireland Titles: 1
Inter-county*
Years	County	Apps (scores)
2006-2007	Cork	4 (0-00)
Inter-county titles
- Munster titles: 1
- All-Irelands: 0
- NFL: 0
- All Stars: 0
- *Inter County team apps and scores correct as of 22:25, 17 April 2020.

David Niblock (born 1981) is an Irish former Gaelic footballer who played for club side Nemo Rangers and at senior level for the Cork county team. He usually lined out in the forwards.

== Career ==
Born in Cork, Niblock is the son of former Derry Gaelic footballer Mickey Niblock and a nephew of Hugh Niblock. He had underage success with the Nemo Rangers club before eventually joining the club's senior team. Over the course of 15 years he won nine County Senior Championship medals, while he was also a part of the club's All-Ireland Club Championship-winning team in 2003. Niblock also lined out in all grades with Cork. After provincial success at minor and under-21 levels he won a Munster Championship medal ain 2006. Niblock was a substitute when Cork were beaten by Kerry in the 2007 All-Ireland final.

== Honours ==
Nemo Rangers

- All-Ireland Senior Club Football Championship: 2003
- Munster Senior Club Football Championship: 2000, 2001, 2002, 2005, 2007, 2010
- Cork Senior Football Championship: 2000, 2001, 2002, 2005, 2006, 2007, 2008, 2010, 2015

Cork

- Munster Senior Football Championship: 2006
- Munster Under-21 Football Championship: 2001
- Munster Minor Football Championship: 1999
