= Niall Geary =

Irish Gaelic footballer

Personal information
- Native name: Niall Ó Gadhra (Irish)
- Born: 1975 (age 50–51) Tramore, County Waterford, Ireland
- Occupation: Software developer

Sport
- Sport: Gaelic football
- Position: Full-back
Clubs
- Years: Club
- Tramore; Nemo Rangers
Club titles
- Cork titles: 7
- Munster titles: 5
- All-Ireland Titles: 1
Inter-county*
Years	County	Apps (scores)
1996-1998 2002-2005	Waterford; Cork	2 (0-00); 6 (0-00)
Inter-county titles
- Munster titles: 1
- All-Irelands: 0
- NFL: 0
- All Stars: 0
- *Inter County team apps and scores correct as of 20:25, 17 April 2020.

Niall Geary (born 1975) is an Irish retired Gaelic footballer who played for club sides Tramore and Nemo Rangers, at inter-county level with the Waterford and Cork senior football teams and with Munster.

== Career ==
Geary began his Gaelic football career with Tramore, with whom he had minor and under-21 championship successes. He simultaneously came to prominence on the inter-county scene with the Waterford minor and under-21 teams before making his senior championship debut in 1996. A move to Cork saw Geary transfer to the Nemo Rangers club and he had a number successes with his adopted club. These included seven County Senior Championship medals in nine seasons between 2000 and 2008, and he was also a part of the club's All-Ireland Club Championship-winning team in 2003. Geary also lined out with the Cork senior football team and won a Munster Championship medal as a substitute in 2002.

== Honours ==
Tramore

- Waterford Under-21 Football Championship: 1994, 1995
- Waterford Minor Football Championship: 1993

Nemo Rangers

- All-Ireland Senior Club Football Championship: 2003
- Munster Senior Club Football Championship: 2000, 2001, 2002, 2005, 2007 (c)
- Cork Senior Football Championship: 2000, 2001, 2002, 2005, 2006, 2007 (c), 2008

Waterford

- All-Ireland Junior Football Championship: 1999
- Munster Junior Football Championship: 1999

Cork

- Munster Senior Football Championship: 2002
