= 2007 All-Ireland Senior Football Championship final =

2007 All-Ireland Football Championship final
- Event: 2007 All-Ireland Senior Football Championship
Kerry	Cork
3–13 (22)	1–9 (12)
- Date: 16 September 2007
- Venue: Croke Park, Dublin
- Referee: David Coldrick (Meath)
- Attendance: 82,196

The 2007 All-Ireland Senior Football Championship final was the 120th All-Ireland Final and the deciding match of the 2007 All-Ireland Senior Football Championship, an inter-county Gaelic football tournament for the top teams in Ireland.

== Match ==
=== Summary ===
This was only the second time in the GAA's history that two teams from the same province contested an All-Ireland SFC final (the first was in 2003).

Kerry won by 10 points.

Vincent Hogan wrote on two of the Kerry goals in the Irish Independent: "Cork gave them two beauties. It was like finding a burglar in your house and helping him to bring the boxes down the stairs"; in 2022, Martin Breheny listed it among "five of the worst" All-Ireland SFC finals since 1972.

=== Details ===
16 September 2007
Final

Cork	1–9 – 3–13	Kerry
D Goulding (1–1), Donncha O'Connor (0–4), James Masters (0–3), Michael Cussen (0–1)	Report	Colm Cooper (1–5), Kieran Donaghy (2–0), Bryan Sheehan (0–2), Tomás Ó Sé, Aidan O'Mahony, Seamus Scanlon, Paul Galvin, Declan O'Sullivan, S O'Sullivan (0–1 each)

Croke Park, Dublin

Cork
Kerry

==== Kerry ====
- 1 D. Murphy
- 2 M. Ó Sé
- 3 T. O'Sullivan
- 4 P. Reidy
- 5 T. Ó Sé
- 6 A. O'Mahony
- 7 K. Young
- 8 D. Ó Sé
- 9 S. Scanlon
- 10 P. Galvin
- 11 Declan O'Sullivan (c)
- 12 E. Brosnan
- 13 C. Cooper
- 14 K. Donaghy
- 15 B. Sheehan

Subs used

- 18 S. O'Sullivan for Galvin
- 20 Darran O'Sullivan for Declan O'Sullivan
- 26 T. Griffin for Young
- 21 M. F. Russell for Sheehan
- 19 M. Lyons for Reidy

Subs not used
16 K. Cremin
17 M. Quirke
22 D. Bohane
23 P. O'Connor
24 R. Ó Flatharta
25 K. O'Leary
27 R. Hussey
28 D. Walsh
29 T. Walsh
30 D. Quill

Manager
P. O'Shea

==== Cork ====
- 1 A. Quirke
- 2 M. Shields
- 3 G. Canty
- 4 K. O'Connor
- 5 N. O'Leary
- 6 G. Spillane
- 7 J. Miskella
- 8 D. Kavanagh (c)
- 9 N. Murphy
- 10 C. McCarthy
- 11 P. O'Neill
- 12 K. McMahon
- 13 J. Masters
- 14 M. Cussen
- 15 D. O'Connor

Subs used
23 D. Goulding for Masters
31 A. Lynch for Miskella
24 F. Goold for McMahon
27 K. O'Sullivan for McCarthy

Subs not used
16 P. O'Shea
17 O. Sexton
18 D. Duggan
19 M. Prout
20 S. Levis
21 E. Cadogan
22 D. Hurley
25 D. Niblock
26 A. Cronin
28 J. Hayes
29 B. Collins
30 S. O'Brien

Manager
B. Morgan
