= Alan Cronin =

Irish Gaelic footballer

Personal information
- Native name: Ailéin Ó Cróinín (Irish)
- Born: 1979 (age 46–47) Cork, Ireland
- Occupation: Technician
- Height: 6 ft 0 in (183 cm)

Sport
- Sport: Gaelic football
- Position: Left wing-forward
Club
- Years: Club
- 1998-2016: Nemo Rangers
Club titles
- Cork titles: 9
- Munster titles: 6
- All-Ireland Titles: 1
Inter-county*
| Years | County | Apps (scores) |
| 2002-2007 | Cork | 16 (0-05) |
Inter-county titles
- Munster titles: 2
- All-Irelands: 0
- NFL: 0
- All Stars: 0
- *Inter County team apps and scores correct as of 15:25, 17 April 2020.

Alan Cronin (born 1979) is an Irish retired Gaelic footballer who played for club side Nemo Rangers, at inter-county level with the Cork senior football team and with Munster. His brother, Martin Cronin, also played Gaelic football.

== Honours ==
Nemo Rangers

- All-Ireland Senior Club Football Championship: 2003
- Munster Senior Club Football Championship: 2000, 2001, 2002, 2005, 2007, 2010
- Cork Senior Football Championship: 2000, 2001, 2002, 2005, 2006, 2007, 2008, 2010, 2015

Cork

- Munster Senior Football Championship: 2002, 2006
