= Mick Daly =

Irish hurler (born 1971)

Personal information
- Native name: Mícheál Ó Dálaigh (Irish)
- Born: 1971 (age 54–55) Cobh, County Cork, Ireland
- Occupation: Irish Navy member
- Height: 6 ft 0 in (183 cm)

Sport
- Sport: Hurling
- Position: Midfield
Clubs
- Years: Club
- 1988-2000 2001-2010: Cobh → Imokilly; Nemo Rangers
Club titles
| | Football | Hurling |
| Cork titles | 5 | 2 |
| Munster titles | 4 | 0 |
| All-Ireland titles | 1 | 0 |
Inter-county
| Years | County | Apps (scores) |
| 1997-1999 | Cork | 3 (0-00) |
Inter-county titles
- Munster titles: 1
- All-Irelands: 1
- NHL: 1
- All Stars: 0

Michael Daly (born 1971) is an Irish former hurler and Gaelic footballer. At club level, he played with Cobh and Nemo Rangers, divisional side Imokilly and at inter-county level with the Cork senior hurling team.

== Career ==
At club level, Daly first played hurling and Gaelic football at juvenile and underage levels with Cobh before progressing to adult level. His performances at club level resulted in his selection for the Imokilly divisional team. Daly won consecutive Cork SHC medals with the divisional side in 1997 and 1998.

Daly later transferred to the Nemo Rangers to played Gaelic football, but still continued to play hurling for Cobh. He went on to win five Cork SFC medals between 2001 and 2007. Daly also claimed four Munster Club SFC medals during that same period and was at wing-back when Nemo beat Crossmolina Deel Rovers by two points in the 2003 All-Ireland club final.

At inter-county level, Daly first appeared for Cork as part of the senior team that won the National Hurling League title in 1998. Daly later claimed a Munster SHC medal, before being a panel member when Cork beat Kilkenny in the 1999 All-Ireland final.

Daly later won an All-Ireland JFC medal in 2001 after a 1-15 to 3-07 win over Mayo in the final. He also won an All-Ireland IHC medal that year, before claiming a second winners' medal in that grade in 2003.

== Honours ==
Nemo Rangers

- All-Ireland Senior Club Football Championship: 2003
- Munster Senior Club Football Championship: 2001, 2002, 2005, 2007
- Cork Senior Football Championship: 2001, 2002, 2005, 2006, 2007

Imokilly

- Cork Senior Hurling Championship: 1997, 1998

Cork

- All-Ireland Senior Hurling Championship: 1999
- Munster Senior Hurling Championship: 1999
- National Hurling League: 1998
- All-Ireland Intermediate Hurling Championship: 2001, 2003
- Munster Intermediate Hurling Championship: 2001, 2003
- All-Ireland Junior Football Championship: 2001
- Munster Junior Football Championship: 2001
