= 2002–03 All-Ireland Senior Club Football Championship =

Irish Football Championship

- Dates: 27 October 2002 – 17 March 2003
- Teams: 32
- Sponsor: Allied Irish Bank
- Champions: Nemo Rangers (1st title); Colin Corkery (captain); Billy Morgan (manager)
- Runners-up: Crossmolina Deel Rovers; James Nallen (captain); John Maughan (manager)

Tournament statistics
- Matches played: 34
- Goals scored: 56 (1.65 per match)
- Points scored: 614 (18.06 per match)
- Top scorer(s): Colin Corkery (2–23)

The 2002–03 All-Ireland Senior Club Football Championship was the 33rd staging of the All-Ireland Senior Club Football Championship since its establishment by the Gaelic Athletic Association in 1970–71. The competition began on 27 October 2002 and concluded on 17 March 2003.

The defending champion was Ballinderry; however, the club lost to Errigal Ciarán in the Ulster Club SFC semi-final.

Nemo Rangers defeated Crossmolina Deel Rovers by 0–14 to 1–9 in the final at Croke Park on 17 March 2003 to win the competition. It was the club's seventh title and a first since 1994.

Nemo's Colin Corkery was the competition's top scorer, finishing with 2–23.

== Connacht ==
=== Quarter-final ===
10 November 2002 Quarter-final	Eastern Harps	1-08 - 0-10	Corofin	Markievicz Park
	S Gallagher 1-1, P Taylor 0-3, K Carty 0-2, J Bruen 0-1, S Dorrian 0-1.		A O'Donovan 0-4, E Killeen 0-2, D Hanly 0-2, S Conlisk 0-1, G Delaney 0-1.	Referee: A Stenston (Leitrim)

=== Semi-finals ===
3 November 2002 Semi-final	Allen Gaels	1-07 - 2-14	Crossmolina Deel Rovers	Páirc Seán Mac Diarmada
	D Gilhooly 1-3, A Cullen 0-2, H Gibbons 0-1, N Moran 0-1.		L Moffatt 2-2, C McDonald 0-5, M Moyles 0-2, P McGuinness 0-1, P Gardiner 0-1, G O'Malley 0-1, G Walsh 0-1, B Loftus 0-1.	Referee: M Duffy (Sligo)

17 November 2002 Semi-final	Eastern Harps	0-07 - 0-08	Strokestown	Markievicz Park
	P Taylor 0-2, S Dorrian 0-2, M McCormack 0-1, M Doddy 0-1, P Henry 0-1.		L Dolan 0-3, C Silke 0-2, JK Dolan 0-1, P McGinley 0-1, E Collins 0-1.	Referee: M Daly (Mayo)

=== Final ===
1 December 2002 Final	Strokestown	0-10 - 1-11	Crossmolina Deel Rovers	Dr Hyde Park
	L Dolan 0-7 (6f, 1 '45'), E Collins, R Owens, C Silke 0-1 each.	Report	K McDonald 0-6 (4f), L Moffatt 0-2, P Gardiner, G Walsh, P McGuinness 0-1 each.	Referee: Enda Stenson (Leitrim)

== Leinster ==
=== First round ===
27 October 2002 First round	Ballymahon	0-06 - 0-08	Rathnew	Leo Casey Park
	J Lennon 0-3, T Smullen 0-1, F Dolan 0-1, P Connolly 0-1.		T Gill 0-3, T Doyle 0-2, N Mernagh 0-1, J Stafford 0-1, D Byrne 0-1.

27 October 2002 First round	Mattock Rangers	1-09 - 0-12	Starlights	St Mary's Park
	C Grimes 0-5, N Callan 1-0, N Brennan 0-3, D Reid 0-1.		J Hudson 0-5, M Donoghue 0-4, S Deegan 0-2, O O'Connor 0-1.

27 October 2002 First round	Garrycastle	1-07 - 0-08	Portlaoise	Cusack Park
	J McAteer 1-1, D Dolan 0-4, N Galvin 0-1, A Daly 0-1.		I Fitzgerald 0-5, K Fitzpatrick 0-1, B McCormack 0-1, C Murphy 0-1.

2 November 2002 First round replay	Starlights	1-09 - 3-12	Mattock Rangers	Enniscorthy
	J Hudson 1-7, W Hudson 0-1, A Russell 0-1.		D Reid 0-6, N Callan 1-1, S Grimes 1-0, R Brennan 1-0, C Grimes 0-2, M Brennan 0-1, I Sherlock 0-1, A Finnegan 0-1.

3 November 2002 First round	Rathvilly	0-10 - 0-08	Erin's Own	Dr Cullen Park
	S Kavanagh 0-4, D O'Donoghue 0-2, F Kelly 0-2, P Molloy 0-1, M Curran 0-1.		A Holden 0-5, D Buggy 0-1, K Brennan 0-1, E Brennan 0-1.

=== Quarter-finals ===
10 November 2002 Quarter-final	Mattock Rangers	2-11 - 1-07	Tullamore	St Mary's Park
	N Callan 1-1, S Grimes 1-0, R Brennan 0-3, D Reid 0-2, A Finnegan 0-2, C Grimes 0-2, F Feeley 0-1.		PJ Martin 1-0, P Rouse 0-3, P Kelly 0-2, A Hogan 0-1, G Lee 0-1.	Referee: P Fox (Westmeath)

10 November 2002 Quarter-final	Garrycastle	1-04 - 0-13	Moorefield	Cusack Park
	D Dolan 0-4, G Dolan 1-0.		P Murray 0-6, B McGrogan 0-2, M Sexton 0-2, M Ryan 0-2, P Wolfe 0-1.

17 November 2002 Quarter-final	Rathvilly	0-02 - 1-11	Dunshaughlin	Dr Cullen Park
	D Nolan 0-1, M Curran 0-1.		R Moloney 1-1, T Dowd 0-4, N Kelly 0-2, B Kealy 0-1, R Kealy 0-1, D Burke 0-1, J Crimmins 0-1.	Referee: S Doyle (Wexford)

1 December 2002 Quarter-final	Rathnew	1-06 - 1-05	University College Dublin	St Conleth's Park
	T Gill 1-6.		C McAnallen 1-1, C McManus 0-2, B McDonald 0-1, J Hanley 0-1.

=== Semi-finals ===
24 November 2002 Semi-final	Mattock Rangers	3-13 - 2-10	Moorefield	Páirc Tailteann
	D Reid 1-4, M Brennan 1-1, C Grimes 0-4, R Brennan 0-2, N Callan 0-1, A Finnegan 0-1.		P Murray 1-5, R Sweeney 1-0, Michael Ryan 0-4, M Sexton 0-1.	Referee: J Smith (Meath)

8 December 2002 Semi-final	Dunshaughlin	0-12 - 1-09	Rathnew	St Conleth's Park
	N Kelly 0-3, M Reilly 0-3, T Dowd 0-3, D Crimmins 0-1, R Kealy 0-1, D Burke 0-1.		T Doyle 0-5, M Doyle 1-1, T Gill 0-2, R Dignam 0-1.	Referee: John Bannon (Longford)

15 December 2002 Semi-final replay	Dunshaughlin	1-07 - 0-04	Rathnew	St. Conleth's Park
	R Moloney 1-0, R Kealy 0-2, N Kelly 0-2, M Reilly 0-2, D Tonge 0-1.		T Gill 0-1, R Coffey 0-1, T Doyle 0-1, L Glynn 0-1.	Referee: Michael Monahan (Kildare)

=== Final ===
22 December 2002 Final	Dunshaughlin	0-13 - 0-07	Mattock Rangers	Páirc Tailteann
	N Kelly 0-3 (1f), M Reilly (2f), R Kealy (2f), D Crimmins, D Tonge 0-2 each, T Dowd, R Moloney 0-1 each.	Report	C Grimes 0-3 (1f), D Reid 0-2, R Brennan, S Grimes 0-1 each.	Referee: E Whelan (Laois)

== Munster ==
=== Quarter-finals ===
27 October 2002 Quarter-final	Kilmurry Ibrickane	0-08 - 1-09	Nemo Rangers	Quilty
	O O'Dwyer (0-4, 3fs), M O'Dwyer (0-3), J Daly (0-1).		A Morgan (1-1), C Corkery (0-4, frees), A Cronin (0-1), B O'Regan (0-1), L O'Sullivan (0-1).	Referee: MA Ryan (Limerick)

9 November 2002 Quarter-final	Stradbally	2-06 - 1-12	Monaleen	Fraher Field
	N Curran (1-3), T Curran (1-0), T Costelloe (0-1), J Coffey (0-1), G Power (0-1).		M Gavin (0-7), E Keating (1-1), J O'Brien (0-2), JP Stokes (0-1), A McEntee (0-1).

=== Semi-finals ===
24 November 2002 Semi-final	Monaleen	1-10 - 1-05	Clonmel Commercials	Gaelic Grounds
	M Gavin 0-6, JP Stokes 1-1, C O'Boyle 0-2, F Melody 0-1.		I Cleary 1-0, I Barnes 0-2, K Dempsey 0-1, E Hanrahan 0-1, Fergal O'Callaghan 0-1.	Referee: J Geaney (Cork)

24 November 2002 Semi-final	Kerins O'Rahilly's	1-07 - 0-16	Nemo Rangers	FitzGerald Stadium
	D Quill 0-5, G Walsh 1-0, J O'Connor 0-1, JW O'Connor 0-1.		C Corkery 0-5, J Masters 0-3, W Morgan 0-2, M Daly 0-1, G Murphy 0-1, A Cronin 0-1, K Cahill 0-1, D Kavanagh 0-1, D Meighan 0-1.	Referee: Paddy Russell (Tipperary)

=== Final ===
8 December 2002 Final	Nemo Rangers	4-15 - 0-06	Monaleen	FitzGerald Stadium
	C Corkery 2-3 (2f, 1 pen), J Masters 1-2 (2f), A Cronin 1-1, J Kavanagh 0-3, G Murphy 0-2, K Cahill, D Kavanagh, W Morgan and S O'Brien 0-1 each.	Report	M Gavin 0-4 (3f), C O'Boyle and J O'Brien 0-1 each.	Referee: B Tyrrell (Tipperary)

== Ulster ==
=== Quarter-finals ===
27 October 2002 Quarter-final	Enniskillen Gaels	0-12 - 2-04	St Gall's	Brewster Park
	T Brewster 0-4, P Brewster 0-2, R McCabe 0-2, R Curran 0-2, R Judge 0-1, C Bradley 0-1.		C McGrourty 1-1, K Niblock 1-0, S Burns 0-2, K Stewart 0-1.

27 October 2002 Quarter-final	Mayobridge	0-07 - 0-09	Ballinderry	Páirc Esler
	M Walsh 0-3, M Linden 0-2, E Woods 0-1, B Coulter 0-1.		G Cassidy 0-3, E. Muldoon 0-2, D Bateson 0-2, D Conway 0-2.

27 October 2002 Quarter-final	Gowna	0-11 - 1-07	Clontibret	Breffni Park
	D McCabe 0-6, G Pierson 0-2, C Fitzpatrick 0-1, C Brady 0-1, S Pierson 0-1.		F Mone 1-2, M Hughes 0-2, J Hughes 0-1, G Leonard 0-1, D Mone 0-1.	Referee: C Broderick (Down)

3 November 2002 Quarter-final	Errigal Ciarán	2-09 - 3-06	Crossmaglen Rangers	Healy Park
	M Harte 1-7, E Gormley 1-1, Pascal Canavan 0-1.		O McConville 1-5, J Hughes 1-0, C Short 1-0, J McEntee 0-1.	Referee: Pat McEnaney (Monaghan)

17 November 2002 Quarter-final replay	Errigal Ciarán	1-13 - 1-10	Crossmaglen Rangers	St Tiernach's Park
	Peter Canavan 1-5, M Harte 0-3, D Tierney 0-2, R McCann 0-2, Pascal Canavan 0-1.		O McConville 0-5, J Hughes 1-1, J McEntee 0-3, J Donaldson 0-1.	Referee: Pat McEnaney (Monaghan)

=== Semi-finals ===
10 November 2002 Semi-final	Enniskillen Gaels	1-12 - 0-11	Gowna	St Tiernach's Park
	T Brewster 0-6, R McCabe 0-4, R Judge 1-0, P Brewster 0-1, N Cox 0-1.		G Pierson 0-7, D McCabe 0-3, D Duignan 0-1.	Referee: J McKee (Armagh)

24 November 2002 Semi-final	Errigal Ciarán	0-10 - 0-04	Ballinderry	St Tiernach's Park
	Peter Canavan 0-4, E McGinley 0-1, Pascal Canavan 0-1, P Loughran 0-1, A McGinley 0-1, R McCann 0-1, D Tierney 0-1.		G Cassidy 0-3, E. Muldoon 0-1.	Referee: Brian Crowe (Cavan)

=== Final ===
1 December 2002 Final	Errigal Ciarán	0-08 - 1-03	Enniskillen Gaels	St. Tiernach's Park
	Peter Canavan 0-4, R McCann 0-2, E McGinley, P Horisk 0-1 each.	Report	R Judge 1-0, T Brewster 0-3.	Referee: M Convery (Derry)

== Quarter-final ==
8 December 2002 Quarter-final	St Brendan's	1-07 - 1-11	Crossmolina Deel Rovers	Emerald GAA Grounds
	M Gill 1-1, B Solan 0-2, E O'Reilly 0-1, N Barry 0-1, S Manley 0-1.		K McDonald 0-5, M Moyles 1-1, P McGuinness 0-3, L Moffatt 0-2.

== Semi-finals ==
23 February 2003 Semi-final	Crossmolina Deel Rovers	3-10 - 1-12	Dunshaughlin	Dr Hyde Park
	K McDonald (0-6, 3 frees, 1 45), M Moyles (1-1), M Moffatt (1-1), J Keane (1-1), G O'Malley (0-1).	Report	M Reilly (0-6, all frees), B Kealy (1-0), R Kealy (0-3, all frees); D Crimmins (0-2), R Maloney (0-1).	Referee: M McGrath (Donegal)

23 February 2003 Semi-final	Nemo Rangers	1-12 - 0-11	Errigal Ciarán	O'Moore Park
	C Corkery (0-5, four frees), A Cronin (1-0), D Kavanagh (0-2); J Kavanagh (0-2), K Cahill (0-1), S O'Brien (0-1), W Morgan (0-1).	Report	Peter Canavan (0-4, three frees), M Harte (0-3, all frees), D Tierney (0-2), P Loughran (0-2).	Referee: G Kinneavy (Roscommon)

== Final ==
17 March 2003 Final	Nemo Rangers	0-14 - 1-09	Crossmolina Deel Rovers	Croke Park
	C Corkery (0-6, 1f, 1 45), A Cronin (0-4), J Kavanagh (0-3), K Cahill (0-1).		K McDonald (0-5, 1f), L Moffat (1-0), J Leonard (0-2), J Keane (0-1), G Walsh (0-1).	Referee: Brian Crowe (Cavan)

== Finalists ==
Nemo Rangers – 2003 All-Ireland Senior Club Football Champions (7th title)

Billy Morgan managed the winning team.

1. Don Heaphy
2. Larry Kavanagh
3. Niall Geary
4. Seán O'Brien
5. Gary Murphy
6. Martin Cronin
7. Mick Daly
8. Kevin Cahill
9. Derek Kavanagh
10. Alan Cronin
11. Steven O'Brien
12. Maurice McCarthy
13. Joe Kavanagh
14. Colin Corkery
15. William Morgan

Subs used

P. Brophy for N. Geary
B. O'Regan for Cronin
D. Mehigan for D. Kavanagh
J. P. O'Neill for Stephen O'Brien

Crossmolina Deel Rovers – 2003 All-Ireland Senior Club Football Championship runners-up

John Maughan managed the losing team.

1. Barry Heffernan
2. Stephen Rochford
3. Tom Nallen
4. Colm Reilly
5. Peadár Gardiner
6. Damien Mulligan
7. Gerard O'Malley
8. Gabriel Walsh
9. James Nallen (c)
10. Michael Moyles
11. Ciarán McDonald
12. Enda Lavelle
13. Liam Moffatt
14. Joe Keane
15. Paul McGuinness

Subs used

19 Johnny Leonard for E. Lavelle
17 Patrick McAndrew for G. O'Malley

== Statistics ==
=== Top scorers ===
Overall

Rank	Player	Club	Tally	Total	Matches	Average
1	Colin Corkery	Nemo Rangers	2-23	29	5	5.80
2	Ciarán McDonald	Crossmolina Deel Rovers	0-27	27	5	5.40
3	Peter Canavan	Errigal Ciarán	1-17	20	5	4.00
4	David Reid	Mattock Rangers	1-15	18	5	3.60
5	Muiris Gavin	Monaleen	0-17	17	3	5.66
6	Mark Harte	Errigal Ciarán	1-13	16	5	3.20
6	Christy Grimes	Mattock Rangers	0-16	16	5	3.20
8	John Hudson	Starlights	1-12	15	2	7.50
8	Tommy Gill	Rathnew	1-12	15	4	3.75
10	Paddy Murray	Moorelfield	1-11	14	2	7.00

In a single game

Rank	Player	Club	Tally	Total	Opposition
1	John Hudson	Starlights	1-07	10	Mattock Rangers
1	Mark Harte	Errigal Ciarán	1-07	10	Crossmaglen Rangers
3	Colin Corkery	Nemo Rangers	2-03	9	Monaleen
3	Tommy Gill	Rathnew	1-06	9	UCD
5	Liam Moffatt	Crossmolina Deel Rovers	2-02	8	Allen Gaels
5	Paddy Murray	Moorefield	1-05	8	Mattock Rangers
5	Oisín McConville	Crossmaglen Rangers	1-05	8	Errigal Ciarán
5	Peter Canavan	Errigal Ciarán	1-05	8	Crossmaglen Rangers
9	David Reid	Mattock Rangers	1-04	7	Moorefield
9	Luke Dolan	Strokestown	0-07	7	Crossmolina Deel Rovers
9	Muiris Gavin	Monaleen	0-07	7	Stradbally
9	Gerald Pierson	Gowna	0-07	7	Enniskillen Gaels

=== Miscellaneous ===
- The Donegal club champion did not contest the Ulster Club SFC due to a series of disputes and a delay in the completion of the Donegal County Championship.
- Dunshaughlin won the Leinster Club SFC for the first time in their history.
- Nemo Rangers became the first team to win three successive Munster Club SFC titles.
