= Martin Cronin =

Irish sportsperson (born 1975)

Personal information
- Native name: Máirtín Ó Cróinín (Irish)
- Born: 1975 (age 50–51) Cork, Ireland
- Occupation: Engineer
- Height: 6 ft 0 in (183 cm)

Sport
- Sport: Gaelic football
- Position: Left wing-back
Club
- Years: Club
- 1994-2010: Nemo Rangers
Club titles
- Cork titles: 8
- Munster titles: 6
- All-Ireland Titles: 1
College
- Years: College
- Cork RTC
College titles
- Sigerson titles: 0
Inter-county
Years	County	Apps (scores)
1996-2005	Cork	31 (0-08)
Inter-county titles
- Munster titles: 2
- All-Irelands: 0
- NFL: 1
- All Stars: 0

Martin Cronin (born 1975) is an Irish retired Gaelic footballer. At club level, he played with Nemo Rangers and was also a member of the Cork senior football team.

== Career ==
Cronin first played Gaelic football with the Nemo Rangers club at juvenile and underage levels, before progressing to adult level in 1994. He won his first Cork SFC medal in 2000, following a 1–14 to 0–07 win over Carbery in the final. It was the first of a then club record of eight Cork SHC medals in an 11-year period. Cronin also won six Munster Club SFC medals. He was centre-back when Nemo Rangers beat Crossmolina Deel Rovers by 0–14 to 1–09 in the 2003 All-Ireland club final.

At inter-county level, Cronin first appeared for Cork as a member of the minor team that won the All-Ireland MFC title in 1993, after a 2–07 to 0–09 win over Meath in the final. He later progressed to the under-21 team and added an All-Ireland U21FC medal to his collection when he was an unused substitute in the defeat of Mayo in the 1994 All-Ireland under-21 final.

Cronin made his senior team debut in 1996 and claimed a National League title in 1999 after a defeat of Dublin in the league final. He later added a Munster SFC medal to his collection, before ending the season with a defeat by Meath in the 1999 All-Ireland final. Cronin won a second Munster SFC medal in 2002 and served as team captain in 2003.

As a member of the Munster inter-provincial team, Cronin won a Railway Cup medal in 1999 after Munster's 0–10 to 0–07 win over Connacht in the final.

== Honours ==
Nemo Rangers

- All-Ireland Senior Club Football Championship: 2003
- Munster Senior Club Football Championship: 2000, 2001, 2002, 2005, 2007, 2010
- Cork Senior Football Championship: 2000, 2001, 2002, 2005, 2006, 2007, 2008, 2010
- Cork Junior A Hurling Championship: 2000
- City Division Junior A Hurling Championship: 1994, 1998, 2000, 2007, 2009

Cork

- Munster Senior Football Championship: 1999, 2002
- National Football League: 1998–99
- All-Ireland Under-21 Football Championship: 1994
- Munster Under-21 Football Championship: 1994
- All-Ireland Minor Football Championship: 1993
- Munster Minor Football Championship: 1993

Munster

- Railway Cup: 1999

Sporting positions
Preceded by Colin Corkery	Cork senior football team captain 2003	Succeeded by Colin Crowley
