= 2008 Cork Senior Football Championship =

Gaelic football competition

- Dates: 18 April 2008 – 5 October 2008
- Teams: 26
- Sponsor: Evening Echo
- Champions: Nemo Rangers (17th title); Maurice McCarthy (captain); Ephie Fitzgerald (manager)
- Runners-up: Douglas; Tom Sheehan (captain); Ronan McCarthy (manager)
- Relegated: Bantry Blues

Tournament statistics
- Matches played: 37
- Goals scored: 55 (1.49 per match)
- Points scored: 742 (20.05 per match)
- Top scorer(s): James Masters (1-30)

The 2008 Cork Senior Football Championship was the 120th staging of the Cork Senior Football Championship since its establishment by the Cork County Board in 1887. The draw for the opening fixtures took place in December 2007. The championship began on 18 April 2008 and ended on 5 October 2008.

Nemo Rangers entered the championship as the defending champions.

On 5 October 2008, Nemo Rangers won the championship following a 0-13 to 0-05 defeat of Douglas in the final. This was their 17th championship title overall and their fourth title in succession.

James Masters from the Nemo Rangers club was the championship's top scorer with 1-30.

== Team changes ==
=== To Championship ===
Promoted from the Cork Premier Intermediate Football Championship

- Mallow

=== From Championship ===
Relegated to the Cork Premier Intermediate Football Championship

- St. Finbarr's
- St. Vincent's

== Results ==
=== Divisions/colleges section ===
20 April 2008 Round 1	Seandún	2-10 - 0-10	Beara	Rossa Park, Skibbereen
	R O'Mahony 1-3, JP Murphy 0-5, B McGinn 1-1, T O'Connell 0-1.		KJ O'Sullivan 0-5, BJ O'Sullivan 0-3, C Harrington 0-1, G Lowney 0-1.	Referee: S Collins (Carrigaline)

21 April 2008 Round 1	University College Cork	2-08 - 1-15	Carbery	Páirc Naomh Eoin, Newcestown
	C Daly 1-0, T O'Regan 1-0, F Gould 0-3, W Kennedy 0-1, D Gould 0-1, P Corrigan 0-1, D Farrell 0-1, J Gould 0-1.		C O'Driscoll 0-5, C Keane 1-1, D O'Donovan 0-4, F Arundel 0-2, R Moloney 0-1, T Twomey 0-1, M Barrett 0-1.	Referee: P O'Leary (Kilmurry)

23 April 2008 Round 1 D	Duhallow	1-15 - 0-05	Imokilly	Páirc Mac Gearailt, Fermoy
	J Buckley 1-3, B Sheehan 0-4, N Fleming 0-4, N O'Sullivan 0-2, D Flynn 0-1, G Murphy 0-1.		D Holden 0-4, K Mulvihill 0-1.	Referee: D O'Farrell (Mitchelstown)

25 April 2008 Round 1 A	Avondhu	0-09 - 2-11	Cork Institute of Technology	Watergrasshill
	P Kissane 0-5, A O'Brien 0-2, M O'Brien 0-1, D O'Hagan 0-1.		D Goulding 0-6, J Murphy 1-0, E Lyons 1-0, M O'Connor 0-2, H Curran 0-1, P O'Flynn 0-1, R Leahy 0-1.	Referee: D O'Leary (Kilmurry)

5 May 2008 Round 1	Muskerry	0-12 - 0-06	Carrigdhoun	Páirc Uí Rinn, Cork
	A Concannon 0-4, P Dunlea 0-3, S Kelly 0-2, C Brosnan 0-1, S Foley 0-1, E Lougheed 0-1.		G White 0-2, K Corrigan 0-2, E Murphy 0-1, J Kingston 0-1.	Referee: J Dorgan (Nemo Rangers)

10 May 2008 Round 2	Cork Institute of Technology	2-07 - 1-11	Duhallow	Dr. Croke Park, Ballyclough
	P O'Flynn 1-1, R Leahy 1-0, D Goulding 0-3, H Curran 0-1, J Murphy 0-1, A O'Reilly 0-1.		D O'Connor 1-5, N O'Sullivan 0-2, D Flynn 0-1, N Fleming 0-1, J Buckley 0-1, M Dilworth 0-1.

=== Round 1 ===
18 April 2008 Round 1	Carbery Rangers	0-13 - 0-05	Bishopstown	Charlie Hurley Park, Bandon
	S Hayes 0-4, K McMahon 0-3, B Shanahan 0-2, D Creedon 0-2, John Hayes 0-2.		J Ferriter 0-2, S Murphy 0-1, P Honohan 0-1, E Ryan 0-1.	Referee: C McAllister (Aghada)

18 April 2008 Round 1	Naomh Abán	0-10 - 0-09	Dohenys	Inchigeelagh
	M Ó Cróinín 0-8, A Ó Cróinín 0-1, S Ó Laoire 0-1.		P McCarthy 0-2, G McCarthy 0-2, D O'Donovan 0-1, T O'Donovan 0-1, D Lyons 0-1, K Crowley 0-1, P Collins 0-1.	Referee: C Lyons (Nemo Rangers)

18 April 2008 Round 1	Na Piarsaigh	1-10 - 0-12	Bantry Blues	Sam Maguire Park, Dunmanway
	P Gould 1-0, D McDonnell 0-3, J Gardiner 0-3, D Gardiner 0-2, S Glasgow 0-1, A Hurley 0-1.		D Barron 0-7, S Drummey 0-3, R Lynch 0-1, R Harrington 0-1.	Referee: C Lane (Banteer)

18 April 2008 Round 1	Nemo Rangers	3-10 - 2-07	Aghada	Clonmult Memorial Park, Midleton
	A Cronin 2-2, J Masters 0-5, D Kearney 1-1, P Kerrigan 0-1, D Mehigan 0-1.		T O'Keeffe 2-2, C Fleming 0-5.	Referee: M Collins (Clonakilty)

18 April 2008 Round 1	O'Donovan Rossa	1-09 - 0-09	Ballincollig	Ballineen
	C McCarthy 1-3, B Dwyer 0-3, N Kearney 0-1, R McCarthy 0-1, S Carmody 0-1.		P O'Mahony 0-4, J Kelly 0-2, L O'Toole 0-1, B Cotter 0-1, S O'Donoghue 0-1.	Referee: J Dorgan (Nemo Rangers)

19 April 2008 Round 1	Castlehaven	0-12 - 0-10	Mallow	Macroom
	P Hurley 0-3, S Cahalane 0-3, C Crowley 0-2, D Burns 0-2, M Collins 0-1, B Collins 0-1.		C O'Riordan 0-5, J O'Sullivan 0-3, B O'Halloran 0-1, J Hayes 0-1.	Referee: J Dorgan (Nemo Rangers)

20 April 2008 Round 1	Douglas	1-13 - 0-08	Clonakilty	Brinny Sportsfield, Brinny
	M Harrington 1-4, J Farrell 0-3, F O'Sullivan 0-3, C Dineen 0-1, C Hogan 0-1, W Coveney 0-1.		P Griffin 0-5, C Callanan 0-2, C McManus 0-1.	Referee: P Downey (Inniscarra)

2 May 2008 Round 1	Ilen Rovers	2-11 - 0-09	St. Nicholas'	Sam Maguire Park, Dunmanway
	K O'Sullivan 1-9, A Holland 1-1, C O'Driscoll 0-1.		R Brosnan 0-6, D Busteed 0-1, K Barry 0-1, G Moylan 0-1.	Referee: C McAllister (Ballinacurra)

=== Round 2 ===
11 May 2008 Round 2	Clonakilty	1-10 - 0-06	Bishopstown	Brinny
	C Callanan 1-3, P Griffin 0-2, C Murphy 0-2, N Hayes 0-1, N Griffin 0-1, B Walsh 0-1.		P Honohan 0-2, R Honohan 0-1, E Ryan 0-1, J O'Shea 0-1, B Healy 0-1.

18 May 2008 Round 2	Aghada	3-12 - 0-09	Bantry Blues	Charlie Hurley Park, Bandon
	T O'Keeffe 2-1, C Fleming 0-6, P O'Neill 1-2, JP O'Connor 0-3.		D Barron 0-4, S Drummey 0-3, J Canty 0-1, D O'Neill 0-1.	Referee: J Dorgan (Nemo Rangers)

1 June 2008 Round 2	Ballincollig	1-09 - 0-10	St. Nicholas'	Páirc Liam Mhic Cárthaigh, Ballygarvan
	C O'Sullivan 1-0, P O'Mahony 0-2, J Kelly 0-2, J O'Brien 0-2, N Allen 0-1, E Hegarty 0-1, A Donovan 0-1.		R Brosnan 0-6, P O'Brien 0-1, G Moylan 0-1, D Busteed 0-1, G Callinan 0-1.	Referee: G McSweeney (Glenville)

1 June 2008 Round 2	Dohenys	0-13 - 0-10	Mallow	Carrigadrohid
	G McCarthy 0-10, D O'Sullivan 0-1, P Deane 0-1, K Crowley 0-1.		J Hayes 0-4, J O'Sullivan 0-3, C O'Riordan 0-3.	Referee: P O'Leary (Kilmurry)

=== Relegation play-offs ===
22 June 2008 Semi-final	Bishopstown	0-15 - 0-10	Bantry Blues	Inchigeelagh
	P Honohan 0-5, B Healy 0-3, J O'Shea 0-2, R Honohan 0-2, N O'Donovan 0-1, P Cronin 0-1, A Coomey 0-1.		D Barron 0-4, D O'Neill 0-3, D McGragh 0-1, G Canty 0-1, K Harrington 0-1.	Referee: P Downey (Inniscarra)

11 July 2008 Semi-final	St. Nicholas'	2-08 - 1-10	Mallow	Páirc Eoin Mhic Cárthaigh, D'more
	R Brosnan 1-1, D Brosnan 0-4, N Harte 1-0, G Callinan 0-2, N Horgan 0-1.		P Dineen 1-2, C O'Riordan 0-4, S Cronin 0-1, K McCarthy 0-1, D Hayes 0-1, D Kerrisk 0-1.	Referee: N Barrett (Carrigtwohill)

18 July 2008 Round 3	Bantry Blues	0-10 - 3-08	Mallow	Kilmurry
	D Barron 0-5, J Canty 0-3, D O'Neill 0-2.		C O'Riordan 1-4, S Cronin 1-1, M O'Brien 1-0, J Hayes 0-2, B Doyle 0-1.	Referee: P O'Leary (Kilmurry)

=== Round 3 ===
18 June 2008 Round 3	Ilen Rovers	0-10 - 0-07	Seandún	Macroom
	K O'Sullivan 0-4, A Holland 0-2, C O'Driscoll 0-2, J Wycherley 0-1, E Sheehy 0-1.		JP Murphy 0-6, D O'Connor 0-1.	Referee: P O'Leary (Kilmurry)

21 June 2008 Round 3	Clonakilty	1-11 - 0-10	Carbery	Castlehaven
	P Griffin 0-4, C Callanan 1-0, B Walsh 0-3, C Murphy 0-2, S Nagle 0-1, D Murphy 0-1.		D O'Donovan 0-5, C O'Driscoll 0-3, C Keane 0-1, M Barrett 0-1.	Referee: J Kearney (Na Piarsaigh)

21 June 2008 Round 3	Duhallow	1-13 - 0-07	O'Donovan Rossa	Macroom
	D O'Connor 0-7, D Flynn 1-0, N Fleming 0-2, N Cronin 0-1, D Gayer 0-1, G Murphy 0-1, C Murphy 0-1.		C McCarthy 0-5, B O'Dwyer 0-2.	Referee: G Harrington (Carrigaline)

22 June 2008 Round 3	Ballincollig	0-09 - 0-08	Muskerry	Cloughduv
	A Donovan 0-3, P O'Mahony 0-2, N Allen 0-2, J Kelly 0-1, E Burke 0-1.		P Dunlea 0-3, N O'Leary 0-1, S Kiely 0-1, A Concannon 0-1, C Brosnan 0-1.	Referee: J Dorgan (Nemo Rangers)

22 June 2008 Round 3	Castlehaven	1-14 - 3-07	Aghada	Brinny
	P Hurley 0-7, M Collins 1-1, C Crowley 0-3, S Cahalane 0-2, D Burns 0-1.		C Fleming 2-1, T Houlihan 1-0, T O'Keeffe 0-2, P O'Neill 0-2, G Melvin 0-1, K O'Connor 0-1.	Referee: C Lane (Banteer)

22 June 2008 Round 3	Douglas	2-14 - 0-03	Naomh Abán	Cloughduv
	M Harrington 1-3, S McCarthy 0-6, T Sheehan 1-0, W Coveney 0-2, C Dineen 0-1, G McLoughlin 0-1, J Farrell 0-1.		A Ó Loingsigh 0-1, M Ó Cróinín 0-1, G Ó Loingsigh 0-1.	Referee: G Sweeney (Glenville)

22 June 2008 Round 3	Nemo Rangers	2-11 - 1-06	Carbery Rangers	St. Mary's Park, Enniskeane
	P Kerrigan 1-4, J Masters 1-3, B O'Driscoll 0-3, A Cronin 0-1.		S Hayes 1-1, J Hayes 0-4, D Hayes 0-1.	Referee: C McAllister (Aahada)

16 August 2008 Round 3	Na Piarsaigh	2-12 - 0-12 (aet)	Dohenys	Kilmurry
	J Gardiner 1-3, T Ó hAilpín 1-0, P Gould 0-3, G Sheehan 0-2, D Gardiner 0-2, A Hurley 0-1, W Long 0-1.		G McCarthy 0-9, D O'Sullivan 0-2, D Healy 0-1.	Referee: C Lane (Banteer)

=== Quarter-finals ===
20 July 2008 Quarter-final	Ilen Rovers	1-14 - 1-10	Clonakilty	Rosscarbery
	A Holland 1-2, K O'Sullivan 0-5, E Sheehy 0-2, J Wycherley 0-2, C O'Driscoll 0-1, K Daly 0-1, B O'Sullivan 0-1.		P Griffin 1-1, B Walsh 0-3, C Callanan 0-2, D Murphy 0-1, M O'Brien 0-1, C O'Donovan 0-1.	Referee: G Sweeney (Glenville)

20 July 2008 Quarter-final	Nemo Rangers	1-10 - 1-10	Castlehaven	Castletown-Kinneigh
	J Masters 0-6, P Kerrigan 0-4, B O'Driscoll 1-0.		B Collins 1-0, P Hurley 0-3, C Hayes 0-2, D Burns 0-2, S Cahalane 0-2, S Hurley 0-1.	Referee: G Harrington (Carrigaline)

6 September 2008 Quarter-final	Douglas	0-09 - 0-06	Ballincollig	Páirc Uí Rinn, Cork
	M Harrington 0-4, S McCarthy 0-1, F O'Sullivan 0-1, T Sheehan 0-1, C Dineen 0-1, B Fitzgerald 0-1.		P O'Mahony 0-4, P Kelly 0-1, J Kelly 0-1.	Referee: N Barrett (Carrigtwohill)

6 September 2008 Quarter-final	Duhallow	2-10 - 0-05	Na Piarsaigh	Coachford
	B Dennehy 1-2, L McLoughlin 1-1, N Fleming 0-2, D O'Connor 0-2, A Walsh 0-1, B Daly 0-1, D Gayer 0-1.		J Gardiner 0-3, S Glasgow 0-1, P Gould 0-1.	Referee: D Farrell (Mitchelstown)

6 September 2008 Quarter-final replay	Nemo Rangers	0-14 - 1-04	Castlehaven	Castletown-Kinneigh
	J Masters 0-8, P Kerrigan 0-4, B O'Driscoll 0-2.		S Cahalane 1-2, N Collins 0-1, B Collins 0-1.	Referee: G Sweeney (Glenville)

=== Semi-finals ===
13 September 2008 Semi-final	Douglas	0-12 - 0-12	Ilen Rovers	Páirc Uí Rinn, Cork
	M Harrington 0-4, S McCarthy 0-4, W Coveney 0-1, K Murphy 0-1, N Gannon 0-1, B Fitzgerald 0-1.		K O'Sullivan 0-6, B O'Sullivan 0-3, C O'Driscoll 0-2, K Daly 0-1.	Referee: C Lane (Banteer)

13 September 2008 Semi-final	Nemo Rangers	2-10 - 1-08	Duhallow	Páirc Uí Rinn, Cork
	B O'Driscoll 2-2, J Masters 0-5, M McCarthy 0-1, A Cronin 0-1, P Kerrigan 0-1.		D O'Connor 1-2, M Dilworth 0-2, D Flynn 0-1, B Dennehy 0-1, B Daly 0-1, N Fleming 0-1.	Referee: G Sweeney (Glenville)

27 September 2008 Semi-final replay	Douglas	0-11 - 0-09	Ilen Rovers	Páirc Uí Rinn, Cork
	S McCarthy 0-5, S O'Sullivan 0-2, B Fitzgerald 0-1, M Harrington 0-1, K Murphy 0-1, R Keating 0-1.		K O'Sullivan 0-2, C O'Driscoll 0-2, A Holland 0-2, K Daly 0-1, D Coughlan 0-1, B O'Sullivan 0-1.	Referee: N Barrett (Carrigtwohill)

=== Final ===
5 October 2008 Final	Nemo Rangers	0-13 - 0-05	Douglas	Páirc Uí Chaoimh, Cork
	P Kerrigan 0-5 (0-1 free); J Masters 0-3; S O’Brien 0-2; D Niblock, M McCarthy and D Kearney (free) 0-1 each.	Report	M Harrington 0-2 (0-1 free); F O’Sullivan (free), B Fitzgerald and T Sheehan 0-1 each.	Attendance: 7,604; Referee: M Collins (Clonakilty)

== Championship statistics ==
=== Top scorers ===
Top scorers overall

Rank	Player	Club	Tally	Total	Matches	Average
1	James Masters	Nemo Rangers	1-30	33	6	5.50
2	Kevin O'Sullivan	Ilen Rovers	1-26	29	5	5.80
3	Mark Harrington	Douglas	2-18	24	6	4.00
4	Donncha O'Connor	Duhallow	2-16	22	5	4.40
4	Paul Kerrigan	Nemo Rangers	1-19	22	6	3.66
5	Ger McCarthy	Dohenys	0-21	21	3	7.00
6	Declan Barron	Bantry Blues	0-20	20	4	5.00
7	Cian O'Riordan	Mallow	1-16	19	4	4.75
8	Cian Fleming	Aghada	2-12	18	3	6.00
9	Trevor O'Keeffe	Aghada	4-05	17	3	5.66

Top scorers in a single game

Rank	Player	Club	Tally	Total	Opposition
1	Kevin O'Sullivan	Ilen Rovers	1-09	12	St. Nicholas'
2	Ger McCarthy	Dohenys	0-10	10	Mallow
3	Ger McCarthy	Dohenys	0-09	9	Na Piarsaigh
4	Alan Cronin	Nemo Rangers	2-02	8	Aghada
4	Trevor O'Keeffe	Aghada	2-02	8	Nemo Rangers
4	Barry O'Driscoll	Nemo Rangers	2-02	8	Duhallow
4	Donncha O'Connor	Duhallow	1-05	8	CIT
4	Mícheál Ó Cróinín	Naomh Abán	0-08	8	Dohenys
4	James Masters	Nemo Rangers	0-08	8	Castlehaven
5	Trevor O'Keeffe	Aghada	2-01	7	Bantry Blues
5	Cian Fleming	Aghada	2-01	7	Castlehaven
5	Paul Kerrigan	Nemo Rangers	1-04	7	Carbery Rangers
5	Mark Harrington	Douglas	1-04	7	Clonakilty
5	Cian O'Riordan	Mallow	1-04	7	Bantry Blues
5	Declan Barron	Bantry Blues	0-07	7	Na Piarsaigh
5	Donncha O'Connor	Duhallow	0-07	7	O'Donovan Rossa
5	Paudie Hurley	Castlehaven	0-07	7	Aghada

=== Miscellaneous ===
- Nemo Rangers are the first club to win four titles in a row.
- Douglas qualify for the final for the first time.
