= Colin Corkery =

Irish Gaelic footballer

Personal information
- Born: 5 January 1971 (age 55) Cork, Ireland
- Height: 6 ft 4 in (193 cm)

Sport
- Sport: Gaelic football
- Position: Corner-forward
Club
Years	Club	Apps (scores)
1989–2005	Nemo Rangers	68 (19–361)
Club titles
- Cork titles: 5
- Munster titles: 4
- All-Ireland Titles: 2
Inter-county
Years	County	Apps (scores)
1993–2004	Cork	32 (32–182)
Inter-county titles
- Munster titles: 4
- All-Irelands: 0
- NFL: 0
- All Stars: 1

Colin Corkery (born 5 January 1971) is an Irish former Gaelic footballer who played for his local club Nemo Rangers and at senior level for the Cork county team from 1993 until 2004.

== Playing career ==
=== Club ===
Corkery played his club football with the Nemo Rangers club on the south side of Cork city, with whom he has had a number of successes. He first came to prominence as a player on the club's minor team that captured the Cork Minor Football Championship title in 1989.

Corkery subsequently joined the Nemo Rangers senior team. He secured a county championship winners' medal in this grade in 1993, following a nine-point defeat of near rivals St. Finbarr's. Nemo later represented Cork in the provincial club championship and even reached the final of that competition. A 1–17 to 0–4 drubbing of Kilmurray Ibrickane gave Corkery a Munster club winners' medal. He later lined out in his first All-Ireland club final, with Mayo's Castlebar Mitchels providing the opposition. A goal after just ten seconds helped Nemo to eventually secure a 3–11 to 0–8 victory. With that Corkery collected an All-Ireland club winners' medal.

By this stage Kavanagh had also joined the Nemo Rangers senior team. He secured a county championship winners' medal in this grade in 2000, following a ten-point defeat of divisional side Carbery. Nemo later represented Cork in the provincial club championship and even reached the final of that competition. A 0–11 to 0–7 defeat of Glenflesk gave Kavanagh a Munster club winners' medal. He later lined out in the foot-and-mouth delayed All-Ireland club final, with Mayo's Crossmolina providing the opposition. Nemo looked to be in the driving seat, however, a second-half comeback, inspired by Ciarán McDonald, saw the momentum switch to the Mayo side. A late Colin Corkery goal narrowed the deficit to one point, however, Nemo were eventually and narrowly defeated by 0–16 to 1–12.

Corkery secured a second county championship winners' medal in 2000, following a ten-point defeat of divisional side Carbery. Nemo later reached the final of the provincial club championship. An 0–11 to 0–7 defeat of Glenflesk gave Corkery a second Munster club winners' medal. He later lined out in the foot-and-mouth delayed All-Ireland club final, with Mayo's Crossmolina providing the opposition. Nemo looked to be in the driving seat, however, a second-half comeback, inspired by Ciarán McDonald, saw the momentum switch to the Mayo side. A late goal by Corkery narrowed the deficit to one point, however, Nemo were eventually and narrowly defeated by 0–16 to 1–12.

In 2001 Corkery secured a third county championship title as Nemo Rangers trounced Bantry Blues in the final. A third Munster club winners' medal was quickly captured, after a 1–11 to 0–10 defeat of Fethard. Corkery subsequently lined out in his second All-Ireland club final, this time with Ballinderry providing the opposition. The championship decider was switched to Semple Stadium because of the reconstruction of Croke Park, however, a change of venue did not suit Nemo. Goals by Gerard Cassidy and Declan Bateson gave the Derry side a 2–10 to 0–9 victory. It was a second consecutive All-Ireland defeat for Nemo.

2002 saw Nemo becoming the first team in nearly sixty years to win three county championship titles in-a-row. A third consecutive Munster club title quickly followed for Corkery, as Nemo trounced Monaleen of Limerick by 4–15 to 0–6. For the third successive year Corkery subsequently lined out in the All-Ireland club final, however, Nemo faced the prospect of becoming three-in-a-row losers. Crossmolina provided the opposition for the second time in three years and the game was a close affair. Corkery scored six points to give Nemo a 0–14 to 1–9 victory. At the third time of asking Corkery had finally captured a second All-Ireland club winners' medal.

=== Inter-county ===
Corkery first came to prominence on the inter-county scene as a member of the Cork minor football team in the late 1980s. He was a non-playing substitute in 1988 as Cork were defeated by Kerry in the Munster final. Corkery joined the starting fifteen in 1989, however, Cork suffered the same fate in the provincial decider. That same year Corkery was also a member of the Cork under-21 football team. He missed out on the team's Munster Under-21 Championship final victory, however, he came on as a substitute in the subsequent All-Ireland final. Galway provided the opposition on that occasion and a close game developed. At the full-time whistle Cork were the champions by 2–8 to 1–10 and Corkery picked up an All-Ireland Under-21 Football Championship winners' medal.

Corkery was expected to join the Cork senior team, however, in 1990 he went to Australia and played Australian Rules Football with Carlton. He returned to Ireland in 1991 and, as expected, joined the Cork senior football panel.

In 1993 Corkery made his senior championship debut for Cork. In that game against Clare he scored a remarkable 2–5. Cork later defeated Tipperary in the provincial final by 1–16 to 1–8, giving Corkery his first Munster winners' medal. Cork subsequently qualified for the All-Ireland final, with Derry providing the opposition. Things did not go to plan as 'the Rebels' were reduced to fourteen men when Tony Davis was harshly red-carded. Séamus Downey scored the winning goal as Derry secured their first All-Ireland with a 1–14 to 2–8 victory. In spite of this defeat Corkery was later presented with an All-Star award.

Corkery added a second Munster winners' medal to his collection in 1994 following another victory over Tipperary. Cork, however, were later defeated by eventual champions Down in the All-Ireland semi-final.

In 1995 Corkery won a third consecutive Munster title as Kerry fell in the provincial decider. Once again Cork were subsequently defeated by eventual All-Ireland champions Dublin in the All-Ireland semi-final.

Cork lost their provincial crown for the next few seasons, however, in 2002 Corkery, who returned to football after a heart condition, tasted success once again. Tipperary provided the opposition in the provincial decider, however, the game ended in a draw. After a thrilling draw Cork trounced Tipperary by 1–23 to 0–7 in the subsequent replay. It was Corkery's fourth Munster winners' medal and his first as captain. The subsequent All-Ireland semi-final pitted Cork against Kerry. It was an historic occasion as it was the first time that these rival teams had met in Croke Park. However Cork were trounced on a score line of 3–19 to 2–7. The year ended with the Cork hurling team going on strike. In turn, the football team joined in a sympathy strike. The players, who had been seeking better conditions, refused to play or train with the county again until the dispute with the county board was resolved.

Following the strike the fortunes of the Cork football team took a turn for the worse. A series of defeats in 2003 and 2004 saw the Cork football team reach an all-time low. Corkery retired from inter-county football following the 2004 championship.

=== Inter-provincial ===
Corkery also lined out with Munster in the inter-provincial football competition. He played with his province in 1995, 1996 and 1997, however, Munster were defeated on all three occasions.

== Career statistics ==
=== Club ===
Team	Season	Cork		Munster		All-Ireland		Total	
Team	Season	Apps	Score	Apps	Score	Apps	Score	Apps	Score
Nemo Rangers	1989-90	1	0-01	—		—		1	0-01
Nemo Rangers	1990-91	—		—		—		—	
Nemo Rangers	1991-92	1	0-02	—		—		1	0-02
Nemo Rangers	1992-93	4	1-21	—		—		4	1-21
Nemo Rangers	1993-94	6	4-36	2	1-16	2	1-11	10	6-63
Nemo Rangers	1994-95	3	0-17	—		—		3	0-17
Nemo Rangers	1995-96	3	0-12	—		—		3	0-12
Nemo Rangers	1996-97	2	0-21	—		—		2	0-21
Nemo Rangers	1997-98	1	0-04	—		—		1	0-04
Nemo Rangers	1998-99	5	2-21	—		—		5	2-21
Nemo Rangers	1999-00	5	3-27	—		—		5	3-27
Nemo Rangers	2000-01	6	0-35	1	0-06	2	1-13	9	1-54
Nemo Rangers	2001-02	5	1-30	2	0-08	2	0-13	9	1-51
Nemo Rangers	2002-03	5	2-33	3	2-12	2	0-11	10	4-56
Nemo Rangers	2003-04	2	1-09	—		—		2	1-09
Nemo Rangers	2004-05	1	0-01	—		—		1	0-01
Nemo Rangers	2005-06	2	0-01	—		—		2	0-01
Career total		52	14-271	8	3-42	8	2-48	68	19-361

Preceded by Joe Kavanagh	Cork Senior Football Captain; 2002	Succeeded by Martin Cronin
