= Michael Monahan =

Philosopher

Michael Monahan (born 1972) is a professor of philosophy at University of Memphis.

== Publications ==
- Monahan, Michael (2017-02-09). Monahan, Michael (ed.). Creolizing Hegel. Rowman & Littlefield Publishers. doi:10.5771/9781786600257. ISBN 978-1-78660-024-0.
- Monahan, Michael J. (2011-05-02). The Creolizing Subject. Fordham University Press. doi:10.5422/fordham/9780823234493.001.0001. ISBN 978-0-8232-3449-3.
