= 2006 Cork Senior Football Championship =

Gaelic football competition

- Dates: 8 April 2006 – 29 October 2006
- Teams: 28
- Sponsor: Evening Echo
- Champions: Nemo Rangers (15th title); Martin Cronin (captain); Ephie Fitzgerald (manager)
- Runners-up: Dohenys; Conor Collins (captain); Jerry O'Mahony (manager)
- Relegated: Mallow; St Michael's

Tournament statistics
- Matches played: 46
- Top scorer(s): James Masters (2-40)

The 2006 Cork Senior Football Championship was the 118th staging of the Cork Senior Football Championship since its establishment by the Cork County Board in 1887. The draw for the opening fixtures took place on 11 December 2005. The championship began on 8 April 2006 and ended on 29 October 2006.

Nemo Rangers entered the championship as the defending champions. Mallow and St Michael's became the first two teams to be officially relegated from the championship.

On 29 October 2006, Nemo Rangers won the championship following a 1-11 to 0-07 defeat of Dohenys in the final. This was their 15th championship title overall, and their second title in succession.

Nemo's James Masters was the championship's top scorer with 2-40.

== Team changes ==
=== To Championship ===
Promoted from the Cork Intermediate Football Championship

- Carbery Rangers

== Results ==
=== Round 1 ===
8 April 2006 Round 1	Douglas	1-14 - 0-06	Mallow	Ballyanley
	M Harrington 1-4, B Fitzgerald 0-2, J Moylan 0-2, F O'Sullivan 0-2, T Sheehan 0-1, J Lane 0-1, R McCarthy 0-1, B Hanrahan 0-1.		C O'Riordan 0-4, B O'Halloran 0-1, D Golden 0-1.

15 April 2006 Round 1	St. Nicholas'	1-10 - 0-12	Ilen Rovers	Charlie Hurley Park, Bandon
	P O'Brien 1-2, J Kearney 0-2, D Brosnan 0-1, N Harte 0-1, G Callanan 0-1, N Horgan 0-1, D Cunningham 0-1, D Busteed 0-1.		J Whooley 0-2, B O'Sullivan 0-2, K O'Sullivan 0-2, K Daly 0-2, C O'Driscoll 0-2, F Collins 0-1, D Duggan 0-1.

16 April 2006 Round 1	Castlehaven	2-07 - 2-12	Dohenys	Rosscarbery
	S Cahalane 0-4, D O'Neill 1-0, S Hurley 1-0, B Collin 0-3.		G McCarthy 2-4, S Farr 0-2, P Collins 0-1, P McCarthy 0-1, D O'Donovan 0-1, D Healy 0-1.

16 April 2006 Round 1	Bishopstown	0-11 - 1-13	St. Finbarr's	Páirc Uí Rinn, Cork
	J Ferriter 0-4, D Crowley 0-2, JL O'Sullivan 0-2, J O'Shea 0-1, D Murphy 0-1, R Honohan 0-1.		R O'Mahony 1-2, G Leahy 0-3, A Callinan 0-2, J O'Donoghue 0-2, C o'Sullivan 0-2, R Curran 0-1, P Murphy 0-1.

16 April 2006 Round 1	Ballincollig	3-04 - 1-07	Nemo Rangers	Ovens
	J Kelly 1-1, A Donovan 1-0, P Kelly 1-0, M Greene 0-2, P Corcoran 0-1.		J Masters 1-5, P Kerrigan 0-1, D Mehigan 0-1.

16 April 2006 Round 1	Aghada	0-10 - 0-09	Na Piarsaigh	Ballinacurra
	T O'Keeffe 0-5, S O'Keeffe 0-2, B Hennessy 0-1, T O'Neill 0-1, E O'Neill 0-1.		J Gardiner 0-4, C O'Mahony 0-2, S O'Sullivan 0-2, M Prendergast 0-1.

16 April 2006 Round 1	Clonakilty	1-08 - 1-06	St Michael's	Brinny
	C Callanan 1-1, C Murphy 0-4, P Griffin 0-2, C O'Donovan 0-1.		A O'Donovan 1-5, M Mulconroy 0-1.

16 April 2006 Round 1	Naomh Abán	1-12 - 1-10	O'Donovan Rossa	Ahiohill
	M Ó Cróinín 0-7, C Ó Tuama 1-0, A Ó Cróinín 0-2, J Mac Cárthaigh 0-2, D Ó Súilleabháin 0-1.		C McCarthy 1-6, J Werner 0-2, R Long 0-1, N McCarthy 0-1.

25 April 2006 Round 1	Bantry Blues	0-09 - 0-11	Carbery Rangers	Aughaville
	D Barron 0-6, D O'Neill 0-1, S Drummey 0-1, J Canty 0-1.		M Moore 0-3, J Murphy 0-2, M O'Sullivan 0-1, N Hayes 0-1, K McMahon 0-1, D Hayes 0-1, S Hayes 0-1, J Hayes 0-1.

=== Round 2 ===
21 May 2006 Round 2	Nemo Rangers	2-11 - 0-03	Mallow	Páirc Mac Gearailt], Fermoy
	S O'Brien 2-1, A Morgan 0-3, J Masters 0-3, J Kerins 0-2, P Kerrigan 0-1, D Kavanagh 0-1.		C O'Riordan 0-2, D Hayes 0-1.

21 May 2006 Round 2	O'Donovan Rossa	1-06 - 0-15	Ilen Rovers	Castlehaven
	N McCarthy 1-0, R Long 0-3, B Dwyer 0-1, D O'Sullivan 0-1, C McCarthy 0-1.		K O'Sullivan 0-6, K Daly 0-3, L O'Driscoll 0-2, F Collins 0-1, E Sheehy 0-1, J Whooley 0-1, D Harman 0-1.

25 May 2006 Round 2	St Michael's	1-06 - 1-09	Bantry Blues	Macroom
	K O'Connell 1-1, J Browne 0-2, R Downey 0-1, A Ryan 0-1, C O'Shea 0-1.		D Barron 1-5, G Canty 0-2, J Griffin 0-1, D McGrath 0-1.

2 June 2006 Round 2	Bishopstown	1-11 - 0-04	Na Piarsaigh	Páirc Uí Rinn, Cork
	J O'Shea 0-6, D Crowley 1-0, J Ferriter 0-3, A Coomey 0-1, JL O'Sullivan 0-1.		J Gardiner 0-1, D Mannix 0-1, M Prendergast 0-1, C O'Sullivan 0-1.

- Castlehaven received a bye in this round.

=== Relegation playoffs ===
24 June 2006 Round 1	Mallow	0-06 - 1-10	O'Donovan Rossa	Macroom
	R Sheehan 0-3, C O'Riordan 0-2, D Golden 0-1.		N McCarthy Jnr 1-1, J Werner 0-3, R Long 0-2, C Crowley 0-1, N McCarthy Snr 0-1, R O'Donovan 0-1, C McCarthy 0-1.

10 September 2006 Round 1	St Michael's	0-04 - 1-13	Na Piarsaigh	Páirc Uí Rinn, Cork
	A O'Donovan 0-3, K O'Connell 0-1.		J Gardiner 1-5, S Glasgow 0-3, D Gardiner 0-2, G Noonan 0-1, D McDonnell 0-1, M Prendergast 0-1.

16 September 2006 Round 2	Na Piarsaigh	1-10 - 2-06	Mallow	Coachford
	J Gardiner 0-5, K Butterworth 1-0, R Healy 0-2, D Gardiner 0-1, S Glasgow 0-1, S O'Sullivan 0-1.		C O'Riordan 1-5, H Dockery 1-0, F McCormack 0-1.

16 September 2006 Round 2	O'Donovan Rossa	1-13 - 1-10	St Michael's	Innishannon
	C McCarthy 0-6, J Werner 1-0, N McCarthy Snr 0-3, R Long 0-2, D Crowley 0-1, F McCarthy 0-1.		A O'Donovan 0-6, C O'Leary 1-0, E Hegarty 0-2, D Gosnell 0-1, B O'Keeffe 0-1.

30 September 2006 Round 3	Na Piarsaigh	1-13 - 1-12	O'Donovan Rossa	Brinny
	D McDonald 0-5, A Brady 1-1, S Guiheen 0-3, J Gardiner 0-2, P Gould 0-1, K Butterworth 0-1.		C McCarthy 0-4, A Keane 1-0, C Crowley 0-3, A O'Regan 0-2, S O'Neill 0-1, P Kearney 0-1, J O'Sullivan 0-1.

1 October 2006 Round 3	Mallow	2-09 - 2-08	St Michael's	Blarney
	C O'Riordan 2-3, J O'Sullivan 0-2, J Hayes 0-1, M O'Leary 0-1, B O'Halloran 0-1, D Hayes 0-1.		A Coughlan 1-3, K O'Connell 1-0, D Gosnell 0-3, C O'Leary 0-1, L Meaney 0-1.

=== Divisional/colleges section ===
17 April 2006 Round 1	University College Cork	2-11 - 2-09	Seandún	Páirc Uí Rinn, Cork
	R Hussey 0-7, F Goold 1-1, S Murphy 1-0, B Mulvihill 0-2, P O'Connor 0-1.		B Barrett 1-1, JP Murphy 0-4, B McGinn 1-0, F Murphy 0-3, M Barry 0-1.

23 April 2006 Round 1	Carrigdhoun	1-14 - 0-03	Avondhu	Páirc Uí Rinn, Cork
	P Buckley 1-0, P Murphy 0-3, B O'Keeffe 0-2, J Kingston 0-2, G Spillane 0-1, G O'Brien 0-1, B Sweeney 0-1, M Prout 0-1, C O'Neill 0-1, F Lynch 0-1, J Shanahan 0-1.		E Pierce 0-2, M Monaghan 0-1.

8 May 2006 Round 1	Beara	1-07 - 2-13	Muskerry	Sam Maguire Park, Dunmanway
	S O'Regan 1-5, A O'Sullivan 0-1, D Carey 0-1.		D O'Connell 1-6, G Morris 1-2, A Concannon 0-1, J Russell 0-1, S White 0-1, J Hurley 0-1, B Kiely 0-1.

9 May 2006 Round 1	Carbery	2-12 - 2-06	Imokilly	Páirc Liam Mhic Cárthaigh, Ballygarvan
	F Arundel 0-5, J O'Connell 1-1, V O'Brien 1-0, D O'Donovan 0-2, A O'Connor 0-2, C O'Leary 0-1, C Keane 0-1.		B O'Callaghan 1-0, N Furlong 1-0, P Cahill 0-2, P Moylan 0-1, P Fitzgerald 0-1, K Coakley 0-1, N O'Riordan 0-1.

14 May 2006 Round 1	Duhallow	1-15 - 0-11	Cork Institute of Technology	Mallow GAA Complex, Mallow
	D O'Connor 0-7, N Cronin 1-3, J Healy 0-2, J Buckley 0-2, E O'Mahony 0-1.		D Goulding 0-4, B Sheehan 0-3, V Hurley 0-1, D Breen 0-1, R O'Connor 0-1, D O'Sullivan 0-1.

21 May 2006 Round 2	Duhallow	1-15 - 0-10	Muskerry	Inchigeela
	D O'Connor 0-7, J Buckley 1-2, G Murphy 0-2, N Cronin 0-2, D O'Flynn 0-1, E O'Mahony 0-1.		D O'Connell 0-5, M Murphy 0-2, R Hoare 0-1, L Concannon 0-1, J White 0-1.

=== Round 3 ===
17 June 2006 Round 3	St. Nicholas'	2-11 - 2-08	Bishopstown	Páirc Uí Rinn, Cork
	R Brosnan 0-8, L Leahy 1-0, D Cunningham 1-0, J Kearney 0-1, D Brosnan 0-1, N Horgan 0-1.		J O'Shea 1-3, D Crowleuy 1-0, J Ferriter 0-3, R Honohan 0-1, J Honohan 0-1.

18 June 2006 Round 3	Castlehaven	0-09 - 3-16	Balincollig	Charlie Hurley Park, Bandon
	P Hurley 0-6, S Cahalane 0-1, I Cahalane 0-1, C Crowley 0-1.		C Weste 2-5, A Donovan 1-2, M Greene 0-3, B Cotter 0-2, J O'Brien 0-2, J Kelly 0-1, F Keohane 0-1.

=== Round 4 ===
16 June 2006 Round 4	Carbery	0-12 - 0-18	Bantry Blues	Clonakilty
	F Arundel 0-3, T Deasy 0-2, A O'Connor 0-2, C O'Driscoll 0-2, S Levis 0-1, D O'Donovan 0-1, M Fehily 0-1.		D Barron 0-8, D O'Neill 0-2, D McGrath 0-2, G Canty 0-2, D O'Shea 0-1, J Griffin 0-1, A Hamilton 0-1, P Clifford 0-1.

18 June 2006 Round 4	Aghada	1-10 - 0-08	Naomh Abán	Páirc Uí Rinn, Cork
	S O'Keeffe 0-4, J O'Connell 1-0, A Kelleher 0-2, E O'Neill 0-2, P O'Neill 0-1, J O'Connor 0-1.		M Ó Cróinín 0-6, D Ó Súilleabháin 0-1, E Ó Scanaill 0-1.

18 June 2006 Round 4	Carbery Rangers	0-08 - 3-15	Clonakilty	Enniskeane
	M Moore 0-5, K McMahon 0-1, J Fitzpatrick 0-1, Seán Hayes 0-1.		C Callanan 1-4, M O'Brien 1-0, P Griffin 1-0, C Murphy 0-3, C O'Donovan 0-3, B Walsh 0-2, C McManus 0-1, D Murphy 0-1, D Lyons 0-1.

18 June 2006 Round 4	Duhallow	2-10 - 0-08	Douglas	Coachford
	D O'Connor 1-4, N O'Sullivan 1-0, J Buckley 0-2, G Murphy 0-2, N Cronin 0-1, S O'Sullivan 0-1.		F O'Sullivan 0-4, M Harrington 0-3, B Fitzgerald 0-1.

18 June 2006 Round 4	Dohenys	2-10 - 0-11	University College Cork	Macroom
	G McCarthy 1-5, S Farr 1-2, D O'Donovan 0-1, S Collins 0-1, D Healy 0-1.		R Hussey 0-9, P O'Connor 0-1, K Mulvihill 0-1.

22 July 2006 Round 4	Ilen Rovers	0-13 - 1-11	Ballincollig	Sam Maguire Park, Dunmanway
	K O'Sullivan 0-8, E Sheehy 0-1, K Daly 0-1, F Collins 0-1, C O'Driscoll 0-1, J Whooley 0-1.		J Kelly 1-2, C Weste 0-5, M Greene 0-3, J O'Brien 0-1.

1 September 2006 Round 4	St. Nicholas'	2-09 - 1-12	Carrigdhoun	Páirc Uí Rinn, Cork
	D Brosnan 1-2, G Callanan 1-0, J Kearney 0-3, R Brosnan 0-3, G Moylan 0-1.		B O'Keeffe 1-1, G Spillane 0-3, P Murphy 0-2, G White 0-2, K Canty 0-1, K O'Keeffe 0-1, N Murphy 0-1, C O'Neill 0-1.

17 September 2006 Round 4 replay	St. Nicholas'	1-10 - 1-10	Carrigdhoun	Páirc Uí Rinn, Cork
	D Busteed 1-1, R Brosnan 0-4, J Kearney 0-3, D Brosnan 0-2.		G White 1-5, F Lynch 0-2, J Murphy 0-1, K Canty 0-1, C O'Neill 0-1.

17 September 2006 Round 4	Nemo Rangers	0-12 - 0-07	St. Finbarr's	Páirc Uí Rinn, Cork
	J Masters 0-8, A Cronin 0-2, R Kenny 0-1, G Murphy 0-1.		R Leahy 0-2, R Curran 0-2, P Murphy 0-1, J O'Donoghue 0-1, C O'Sullivan 0-1.

24 September 2006 Round 4 2nd replay	St. Nicholas'	1-06 - 2-14	Carrigdhoun	Páirc Uí Rinn, Cork
	D Busteed 1-0, P O'Brien 0-3, J Kearney 0-2, R Brosnan 0-1.		F Lynch 1-3, C Ó Conchubhair 1-0, J Shanahan 0-3, G White 0-2, J Kingston 0-2, R O'Sullivan 0-1, J Murphy 0-1, C O'Neill 0-1, W O'Brien 0-1.

=== Quarter-finals ===
12 August 2006 Quarter-final	Dohenys	2-10 - 2-10	Bantry Blues	Aughaville
	G McCarthy 1-5, D O'Donovan 1-1, S Farr 0-2, J Collins 0-2.		J Canty 1-1, S Drummey 1-1, P Clifford 0-4, D Barron 0-3, D McGrath 0-1.

27 August 2006 Quarter-final	Aghada	1-12 - 0-10	Ballincollig	Páirc Uí Rinn, Cork
	S O'Keeffe 0-5, J Connolly 1-1, P O'Neill 0-2, A Kelleher 0-1, J O'Connell 0-1 K Downes 0-1, C Ó Súilleabháin 0-1.		C Weste 0-3, A Donovan 0-2, L O'Toole 0-2, B Cotter 0-1, P Corcoran 0-1, J Miskella 0-1.

27 August 2006 Quarter-final replay	Dohenys	2-07 - 0-05	Bantry Blues	Aughaville
	D Healy 1-1, D O'Donovan 1-0, G McCarthy 0-3, S Collins 0-1, P McCarthy 0-1, M Farr 0-1.		S Drummy 0-3, P Clifford 0-2.

24 September 2006 Quarter-final	Nemo Rangers	1-10 - 0-08	Clonakilty	Charlie Hurley Park, Bandon
	A Cronin 1-1, J Masters 0-4, M Cronin 0-2, J Kerins 0-1, S O'Brien 0-1, D Niblock 0-1.		C Murphy 0-3, P Griffin 0-2, B Walsh 0-1, M O'Brien 0-1, C Callanan 0-1.

1 October 2006 Quarter-final	Duhallow	0-11 - 1-07	Carrigdhoun	Dr. Croke Park, Ballyclough
	D O'Connor 0-4, J Buckley 0-4, D O'Flynn 0-2, J Healy 0-1,		G White 1-1, G Spillane 0-2, F Lynch 0-1, W O'Brien 0-1, N Murphy 0-1, K O'Keeffe 0-1.

=== Semi-finals ===
1 October 2005 Semi-final	Dohenys	0-12 - 0-08	Aghada	Páirc Uí Chaoimh, Cork
	G McCarthy 0-4, S Farr 0-2, P McCarthy 0-2, D Healy 0-2, P Collins 0-1, D O'Donovan 0-1.		K Downes 0-4, J O'Connell 0-2, S O'Keeffe 0-1, J Connolly 0-1.

7 October 2006 Semi-final	Nemo Rangers	0-10 - 1-07	Duhallow	Páirc Uí Rinn, Cork
	J Masters 0-8, G Murphy 0-1, D Niblock 0-1.		D O'Connor 1-5, G Healy 0-1, N O'Sullivan 0-1.

15 October 2006 Semi-final replay	Nemo Rangers	0-12 - 1-07	Duhallow	Páirc Uí Chaoimh, Cork
	J Masters 0-6, S O'Brien 0-2, A Cronin 0-1, A Morgan 0-1, G Murphy 0-1, D Mehigan 0-1.		D O'Connor 1-2, N Cronin 0-4, P O'Leary 0-1.

=== Final ===
29 October 2006 Final	Nemo Rangers	1-11 - 0-07	Dohenys	Páirc Uí Chaoimh, Cork
	J Masters 1-6 (0-2 frees); A Cronin 0-2; D Mehigan, D Niblock and P Kerrigan 0-1 each.	Report	G McCarthy 0-3 frees; D O’Donovan 0-2; M O’Donovan and T O’Donovan 0-1 each.	Referee: J Geaney

== Championship statistics ==
=== Top scorer ===
Overall

Rank	Player	Club	Tally	Total	Matches	Average
1	James Masters	Nemo Rangers	2-40	46	7	6.57
2	Donncha O'Connor	Duhallow	3-29	38	6	6.33
3	Ger McCarthy	Dohenys	4-24	36	6	6.57
4	Cian O'Riordan	Mallow	3-16	25	5	5.00
4	Declan Barron	Bantry Blues	1-22	25	4	6.25
5	Conor McCarthy	O'Donovan Rossa	1-18	21	5	4.20

In a single game

Rank	Player	Club	Tally	Total	Opposition
1	Colin Weste	Ballincollig	2-05	11	Castlehaven
2	Ger McCarthy	Dohenys	2-04	10	Castlehaven
3	Cian O'Riordan	Mallow	2-03	9	St Michael's
3	Conor McCarthy	O'Donovan Rossa	1-06	9	Naomh Abán
3	Dan O'Connell	Muskerry	1-06	9	Beara
3	James Masters	Nemo Rangers	1-06	9	Dohenys
3	Ronan Hussey	UCC	0-09	9	Dohenys
