= Seán O'Brien (Gaelic footballer) =

Irish Gaelic footballer

Seán O'Brien is an Irish Gaelic football player. He is viewed as being instrumental to the success of his club, Nemo Rangers. With Nemo, he has won many county championships, munsters, and an All-Ireland Club Final in 2003. He also plays for Cork and in 2006, he was selected as a Waterford Crystal Munster Football All-Star. He started his inter-county career as a defender, but has since become a half forward.
