= Conor McCarthy (Cork Gaelic footballer) =

Irish Gaelic footballer

Personal information
- Native name: Conchur Mac Cárthaigh (Irish)
- Born: Skibbereen, County Cork
- Height: 6 ft 0 in (183 cm)

Sport
- Sport: Gaelic football
- Position: Half-forward
Club
- Years: Club
- 1999-: O'Donovan Rossa
Club titles
- Cork titles: 0
Inter-county
Years	County	Apps (scores)
2004-	Cork	20 (0-12)
Inter-county titles
- Munster titles: 1
- All-Irelands: 0
- NFL: 0
- All Stars: 0

Conor McCarthy (born 1981 in Skibbereen, County Cork) is an Irish sportsperson. He played Gaelic football with his local club O'Donovan Rossa and was a member of the Cork senior county football team from 2005.
