= 2005 Cork Senior Football Championship =

Gaelic football competition

- Dates: 9 April 2005 – 23 October 2005
- Teams: 30
- Sponsor: Evening Echo
- Champions: Nemo Rangers (14th title); Martin Cronin (captain); Ephie Fitzgerald (manager)
- Runners-up: Muskerry; Niall Buckley (captain); Gary McPolin (manager)

Tournament statistics
- Matches played: 43
- Top scorer(s): James Masters (2-40)

The 2005 Cork Senior Football Championship was the 117th staging of the Cork Senior Football Championship since its establishment by the Cork County Board in 1887. The draw for the opening fixtures took place on 12 December 2004. The championship began on 9 April 2005 and ended on 23 October 2005.

Carbery entered the championship as the defending champions.

On 23 October 2005, Nemo Rangers won the championship following a 1-14 to 0-07 defeat of Muskerry in the final. This was their 14th championship title overall and their first title since 2002.

James Masters from the Nemo Rangers club was the championship's top scorer with 2-40.

== Results ==
=== Round 1 ===
9 April 2005 Round 1	Youghal	0-04 - 0-10	Naomh Abán	Páirc Uí Rinn, Cork
	P Moylan 0-2, B McCarthy 0-2.		M Ó Cróinín 0-5, D O'Sullivan 0-2, G Óg Ó Loingsigh 0-2, D Cronin 0-1.

9 April 2005 Round 1	Ballincollig	2-11 - 1-10	Clyda Rovers	Donoughmore
	M Greene 1-3, J Kiely 1-2, R Ryan 0-2, J Miskella 0-2, O Ó Crualaoich 0-1, L O'Toole 0-1.		P Kissane 0-4, T O'Mullane 1-0, C O'Sullivan 0-2, N O'Mullane 0-1, D O'Shea 0-1, M O'Brien 0-1, O O'Hanlon 0-1.

9 April 2005 Round 1	Aghada	1-07 - 3-12	Nemo Rangers	Páirc Uí Chonaill, Cobh
	B O'Flaherty 1-0, E O'Neill 0-3, T O'Neill 0-1, S O'Keeffe 0-1, J Wall 0-1, P O'Neill 0-1.		J Masters 1-8, S O'Brien 1-2, A Cronin 1-0, W Morgan 0-1, G Murphy 0-1.

10 April 2005 Round 1	Clonakilty	0-10 - 0-12	Bantry Blues	Castlehaven
	C O'Donovan 0-4, B Walsh 0-2, Timmy Anglin 0-1, C Callanan 0-1, J Crowley 0-1, P Griffin 0-1.		D Barron 0-5, P Clifford 0-4, J Canty 0-1, R Lynch 0-1, D McGrath 0-1.

10 April 2005 Round 1	Newcestown	0-11 - 0-07	Cork Institute of Technology	Páirc Liam Mhic Cárthaigh, Ballygarvan
	C Keane 0-5, T Ryan 0-2, J O'Sullivan 0-1, M Kelly 0-1, T Twomey 0-1, Hugh Curran 0-1.		D Goulding 0-3, B Sheehan 0-2, V Hurley 0-1, C O'Connor 0-1.

14 April 2005 Round 1	Bishopstown	1-08 - 0-07	St Michael's	Páirc Uí Rinn, Cork
	J Ferriter 1-5, R Honohan 0-2, S O'Mahony 0-1.		M Mulconroy 0-3, A Coughlan 0-2, D Gosnell 0-1, A Ryan 0-1.

15 April 2005 Round 1	St. Finbarr's	2-06 - 0-18	Ilen Rovers	Clonakilty
	R Curran 1-2, R Leahy 1-0, G Leahy 0-2, F Murray 0-2.		K O'Sullivan 0-8, E Sheehy 0-4, D Whooley 0-2, J Whooley 0-1, B O'Sullivan 0-1, C O'Sullivan 0-1, D Coughlan 0-1.

16 April 2005 Round 1	Douglas	0-11 - 1-07	Mallow	Watergrasshill
	F O'Sullivan 0-4, A Moynihan 0-3, J Farrell 0-2, R Keating 0-1, B Fitzgerald 0-1.		M O'Brien 0-4, D Lavin 1-0, C O'Riordan 0-2, A Aherne 0-1.

20 April 2005 Round 1	Na Piarsaigh	1-10 - 0-09	Castlehaven	Charlie Hurley Park, Bandon
	J Gardiner 0-4, S McLoughlin 1-0, C O'Mahony 0-2, S Glasgow 0-2, D Gardiner 0-1, S Óg Ó hAilpín 0-1.		P Hurley 0-5, I Cahalane 0-1, C Crowley 0-1, S Hurley 0-1, D Burns 0-1.

23 April 2005 Round 1	O'Donovan Rossa	2-11 - 3-07	St. Nicholas'	Ballineen
	R Long 1-2, J Werner 0-5, P Nealon 1-1, E Hodnett 0-2, C McCarthy 0-1.		R Brosnan 1-3, D Dorris 1-2, J Kearney 1-0, N Harte 0-2.

24 April 2005 Round 1	Dohenys	0-11 - 1-11	University College Cork	Kilmurry
	G McCarthy 0-8, M O'Donovan 0-1, J Collins 0-1, D Healy 0-1.		D Walsh 1-1, F Goold 0-3, P Galvin 0-2, R Hussey 0-2, C Brosnan 0-2, M Murphy 0-1.

=== Round 2 ===
21 May 2005 Round 2	Castlehaven	2-11 - 4-03	Youghal	Brinny
	C Crowley 1-4, B Collins 0-6, D Hurley 1-0, P Hurley 0-1.		B Coleman 1-1, L Ó Laochadha 1-0, K Dempsey 1-0, L Desmond 1-0, P Moylan 0-2.

28 May 2005 Round 2	Clyda Rovers	0-03 - 0-14	Dohenys	Carrigadrohid
	P Kissane 0-2, F Dorgan 0-1.		G McCarthy 0-4, D O'Donovan 0-2, M Farr 0-2, J Collins 0-2, S Farr 0-2, M O'Donovan 0-1, P Collins 0-1.

3 June 2005 Round 2	Clonakilty	1-13 - 0-12	Cork Institute of Technology	Brinny
	C O'Donovan 0-5, P Griffin 1-1, B Walsh 0-3, C Murphy 0-2, L Lyons 0-1, N Hayes 0-1, Timmy Anglin 0-1.		D Goulding 0-4, B Sheehan 0-3, P O'Flynn 0-2, E O'Connor 0-1, C Kelly 0-1, DJ Fleming 0-1.

30 June 2005 Round 2	St Michael's	0-14 - 1-10	Mallow	Páirc Uí Rinn, Cork
	A Coughlan 0-4, M Mulconroy 0-3, K O'Connell 0-2, D Gosnell 0-2, B O'Keeffe 0-2, F Ryan 0-1.		C O'Riordan 1-4, D Golden 0-3, J O'Sullivan 0-2, T O'Riordan 0-1.

30 June 2005 Round 2	St. Finbarr's	1-21 - 1-10	St. Nicholas'	Páirc Uí Rinn, Cork
	R Leahy 1-4, R Curran 0-6, F Murray 0-4, J O'Donoghue 0-3, R O'Mahony 0-2, T Olden 0-1, I Keeler 0-1.		J Kearney 0-4, R Brosnan 0-3, D Dorris 0-1, P O'Brien 0-1, G Callanan 0-1.

- Aghada received a bye in this round.

=== Divisional section ===
17 April 2005 Round 1	Beara	1-07 - 1-07	Carrigdhoun	Castletown-Kinneigh
	BJ O'Sullivan 0-4, K Blake 1-0 (og), D Wiseman 0-1, C Harrington 0-1, P Murphy 0-1.		J Shannon 1-0, B O'Keeffe 0-2, C O'Neill 0-2, N Murphy 0-1, K O'Keeffe 0-1, G Spillane 0-1.

19 April 2005 Round 1	Imokilly	0-11 - 0-06	Carbery	Páirc Uí Rinn, Cork
	D O'Sullivan 0-7, V O'Sullivan 0-2, J Holland 0-1, M Cussen 0-1.		F Arnold 0-2, B Harte 0-1, D Hayes 0-1, M Moore 0-1, J O'Connell 0-1

20 April 2005 Round 1	Muskerry	2-12 - 2-11	Seandún	Páirc Uí Rinn, Cork
	P Dunlea 1-6, J Russell 1-2, DD Dorgan 0-2, C Sheehan 0-1, E Murphy 0-1.		J Buckley 1-2, F Murphy 1-2, JP Murphy 0-5, P Condon 0-1, G Quinlan 0-1.

22 April 2005 Round 1 replay	Beara	1-11 - 1-08	Carrigdhoun	Ballineen
	C Harrington 0-4, BJ O'Sullivan 1-0, A O'Regan 0-4, C O'Sullivan 0-3.		D Murray 1-1, B O'Keeffe 0-3, K O'Keeffe 0-2, J Shanahan 0-1, N Murphy 0-1.

24 April 2005 Round 1	Avondhu	0-07 - 1-10	Duhallow	Knocknagree
	M Allen 0-4, T Monaghan 0-2, D Luddy 0-1.		D Buckley 1-2, D O'Connor 0-4, D Herlihy 0-1, R Casey 0-1, J Buckley 0-1, T O'Keeffe 0-1.

8 May 2005 Round 2	Duhallow	1-06 - 0-14	Beara	Inchigeela
	D O'Connor 1-5, D McCabe 0-1.		BJ O'Sullivan 0-5, C O'Sullivan 0-3, D Lowney 0-2, P Murphy 0-1, A O'Sullivan 0-1, A O'Regan 0-1, B Goggin 0-1.

3 May 2005 Round 2	Imokilly	1-08 - 0-14	Muskerry	Páirc Uí Rinn, Cork
	G Holland 1-2, D O'Sullivan 0-5, P Fitzgerald 0-1.		P Dunlea 0-5, T Kenny 0-2, DD Dorgan 0-2, P Concannon 0-1, O Murphy 0-1, R Hoare 0-1, C Sheehan 0-1, N Buckley 0-1.

=== Round 3 ===
24 June 2005 Round 3	Ilen Rovers	1-08 - 0-17	Nemo Rangers	Clonakilty
	K O'Sullivan 1-4, J Wycherley 0-1, E Sheehy 0-1, K Daly 0-1, D Duggan 0-1.		J Masters 0-9, A Cronin 0-2, D Kavanagh 0-1, D Niblock 0-1, A Morgan 0-1, W Morgan 0-1, M McCarthy 0-1, M Kearney 0-1.

25 June 2005 Round 3	Newcestown	1-07 - 2-12	Castlehaven	Sam Maguire Park, Dunmanway
	D Heffernan 1-0, C Keane 0-2, H Curran 0-2, T Ryan 0-1, J O'Sullivan 0-1, T Twomey 0-1.		P Hurley 1-6, C Crowley 1-2, I Cahalane 0-1, D Burns 0-1, B Collins 0-1, F Cahalane 0-1.

2 July 2005 Round 3	Dohenys	0-11 - 0-06	Ballincollig	Macroom
	G McCarthy 0-6, J Collins 0-4, M O'Donovan 0-1.		J Kelly 0-2, M Greene 0-2, B Kelly 0-1, J O'Brien 0-1.

=== Round 4 ===
18 June 2005 Round 4	Bishopstown	1-09 - 1-11	Beara	Wolfe Tone Park, Bantry
	B Hussey 1-0, R Honohan 0-3, J Ferriter 0-2, J O'Shea 0-2, B Healy 0-1, J Honohan 0-1.		BJ O'Sullivan 1-2, C O'Sullivan 0-5, T O'Sullivan 0-2, A O'Sullivan 0-1, A O'Regan 0-1.

25 June 2005 Round 4	Bantry Blues	0-12 - 1-09	Douglas	Sam Maguire Park, Dunmanway
	P Clifford 0-4, J Canty 0-3, D O'Neill 0-2, D Barron 0-2, D McGrath 0-1.		F O'Sullivan 0-4, E Cadogan 1-0, R Keating 0-2, J Farrell 0-1, A Moynihan 0-1, M Harrington 0-1.

25 June 2005 Round 4	Aghada	0-11 - 0-10	Naomh Abán	Páirc Uí Rinn, Cork
	G Melvin 0-5, S O'Keeffe 0-2, P O'Neill 0-1, E O'Neill 0-1, A Kelleher 0-1, J O'Connell 0-1.		M Ó Cróinín 0-9, C Ó Luasa 0-1.

17 July 2005 Round 4	Clonakilty	2-13 - 2-06	University College Cork	Charlie Hurley Park, Bandon
	C Callanan 1-0, H Lenny 1-0, C O'Donovan 0-3, P Griffin 0-2, C Murphy 0-2, S Quirke 0-2, Timmy Anglin 0-1, N Hayes 0-1, D Lyons 0-1, B Walsh 0-1.		F Gould 2-1, J Hayes 0-3, L Ó Líonáin 0-1, D O'Hare 0-1.

13 August 2005 Round 4 replay	Bantry Blues	1-10 - 1-04	Douglas	Sam Maguire Park, Dunmanway
	J Canty 1-3, P Clifford 0-4, D O'Neill 0-1, D O'Shea 0-1, D Barron 0-1.		G O'Leary 1-0, A Moynihan 0-1, E Cadogan 0-1, J Farrell 0-1, N Heffernan 0-1.

17 September 2005 Round 4	St. Finbarr's	0-09 - 0-10	Dohenys	Newcestown
	R Leahy 0-5, C McCarthy 0-2, J O'Donoghue 0-1, R O'Mahony 0-1.		G McCarthy 0-7, M O'Sullivan 0-1, D Healy 0-1, J Collins 0-1.

17 September 2005 Round 4	St Michael's	0-06 - 0-17	Nemo Rangers	Páirc Uí Rinn, Cork
	R Beechinor 0-2, J Browne 0-1, M Mulconroy 0-1, A Coughlan 0-1, A Ryan 0-1.		J Masters 0-8, M Cronin 0-3, G Murphy 0-1, A Morgan 0-1, W Morgan 0-1, M Daly 0-1, P Kerrigan 0-1, C Corkery 0-1.

18 September 2005 Round 4	Na Piarsaigh	3-04 - 0-13	O'Donovan Rossa	Enniskeane
	J Gardiner 1-1, C O'Mahony 1-1, S McLoughlin 1-0, D Gardiner 0-2.		C McCarthy 0-4, E Hodnett 0-4, J Werner 0-2, R O'Donovan 0-1, B Dwyer 0-1, S Carmody 0-1.

18 September 2005 Round 4	Muskerry	2-08 - 1-10	Castlehaven	Enniskeane
	G O'Halloran 2-3, P Dunlea 0-2, P Concannon 0-1, M O'Connor 0-1, D Keane 0-1.		C Crowley 1-4, F Cahalane 0-2, B Collins 0-2, D Burns 0-1, S Cahalane 0-1.

24 September 2005 Round 4 replay	Na Piarsaigh	0-12 - 1-10	O'Donovan Rossa	Castlehaven
	J Gardiner 0-5, S Glasgow 0-3, C O'Sullivan 0-2, C O'Mahony 0-1, R Healy 0-1.		J Werner 0-6, C McCarthy 0-4, R Long 1-0.

=== Quarter-finals ===
13 August 2005 Quarter-final	Aghada	1-08 - 0-09	Beara	Castle Grounds, Macroom
	B Flaherty 1-1, S O'Keeffe 0-4, G Melvin 0-1, E O'Neill 0-1, T O'Neill 0-1.		BJ O'Sullivan 0-4, C O'Sullivan 0-3, A Harrington 0-1, D Wiseman 0-1.

24 September 2005 Quarter-final	Nemo Rangers	3-10 - 1-05	Bantry Blues	Castlehaven
	J Masters 1-6, J Kavanagh 1-0, D Niblock 1-0, S O'Brien 0-1, A Cronin 0-1, P Kerrigan 0-1, M McCarthy 0-1.		A Hamilton 1-0, P Clifford 0-2, J Canty 0-1, N Canty 0-1, J Griffin 0-1.

25 September 2005 Quarter-final	Muskerry	3-08 - 3-07	Clonakilty	Sam Maguire Park, Dunmanway
	J Russell 1-2, P Concannon 1-1, N Buckley 1-0, C Sheehan 0-1, N O'Leary 0-1, P Dunlea 0-1, D Dorgan 0-1, D O'Connell 0-1.		B Walsh 1-3, C Callanan 1-2, C O'Donovan 1-1, P Griffin 0-1.

9 October 2005 Quarter-final	Dohenys	2-09 - 1-08	O'Donovan Rossa	Páirc Tadhg na Samhna, Drimoleague
	G McCarthy 1-2, D O'Donovan 1-1, M O'Donovan 0-2, S Farr 0-2, J Collins 0-1, R O'Sullivan 0-1.		C McCarthy 1-2, J Werner 0-3, B O'Dwyer 0-2, R Long 0-1.

=== Semi-finals ===
15 October 2005 Semi-final	Nemo Rangers	0-13 - 0-09	Aghada	Páirc Uí Rinn, Cork
	W Morgan 0-3, J Masters 0-3, B O'Regan 0-2, D Kavanagh 0-1, S O'Brien 0-1, A Cronin 0-1, M McCarthy 0-1, J Kavanagh 0-1.		E O'Neill 0-5, J Crowley 0-1, P O'Neill 0-1, J O'Connell 0-1, G Melvin 0-1.

16 October 2005 Semi-final	Muskerry	2-06 - 1-08	Dohenys	Páirc Uí Chaoimh, Cork
	P Dunlea 1-2, D Keane 1-0, P Concannon 0-2, D Dorgan 0-2.		G McCarthy 0-5, D Healy 1-1, M O'Donovan 0-1, P Collins 0-1.

=== Final ===
23 October 2005 Final	Nemo Rangers	1-14 - 0-07	Muskerry	Páirc Uí Chaoimh, Cork
	J Masters 0-6 (0-5f), W Morgan 1-1, D Kavanagh 0-2, S O'Brien, A Morgan, P Kerigan, A Cronin, D Niblock 0-1 each.	Report	C Sheehan, G O'Halloran 0-2 each, J Rusell, D Dorgan, D O'Connell 0-1 each.	Attendance: 6,015; Referee: G Harrington

== Championship statistics ==
=== Top scorers ===
Overall

Rank	Player	Club	Tally	Total	Matches	Average
1	James Masters	Nemo Rangers	2-40	46	6	7.66
2	Gerard McCarthy	Dohenys	1-32	35	6	5.83
3	Pat Dunlea	Muskerry	2-16	22	5	4.40
4	Brendan Jer O'Sullivan	Beara	2-15	21	5	4.20
5	Colin Crowley	Castlehaven	3-11	20	4	5.00
6	Colin O'Donovan	Clonakilty	1-13	16	4	4.00
6	Jurgen Werner	O'Donovan Rossa	0-16	16	4	4.00
7	Roy Leahy	St. Finbarr's	2-09	15	3	5.00
7	Paudie Hurley	Castlehaven	1-12	15	4	3.75
7	Kevin O'Sullivan	Ilen Rovers	1-12	15	2	7.50

In a single game

Rank	Player	Club	Tally	Total	Opposition
1	James Masters	Nemo Rangers	1-08	11	Aghada
2	Gary O'Halloran	Muskerry	2-03	9	Castlehaven
2	Pat Dunlea	Muskerry	1-06	9	Seandún
2	Paudie Hurley	Castlehaven	1-06	9	Newcestown
2	James Masters	Nemo Rangers	1-06	9	Bantry Blues
2	Mícheál Ó Cróinín	Naomh Abán	0-09	9	Aghada
2	James Masters	Nemo Rangers	0-09	9	Ilen Rovers
3	Jack Ferriter	Bishopstown	1-05	8	St Michael's
3	Donncha O'Connor	Duhallow	1-05	8	Beara
3	Kevin O'Sullivan	Ilen Rovers	0-08	8	St. Finbarr's
3	Gerard McCarthy	Dohenys	0-08	8	UCC
3	James Masters	Nemo Rangers	0-08	8	St Michael's
