= 2007 Cork Senior Football Championship =

Gaelic football competition

- Dates: 7 April 2007 – 28 October 2007
- Teams: 27
- Sponsor: Evening Echo
- Champions: Nemo Rangers (16th title); Niall Geary (captain); Ephie Fitzgerald (manager)
- Runners-up: Ilen Rovers; Brian O'Sullivan (captain); Flor O'Driscoll (manager)
- Relegated: St. Vincent's

Tournament statistics
- Top scorer(s): James Masters (2-29)

The 2007 Cork Senior Football Championship was the 119th staging of the Cork Senior Football Championship since its establishment by the Cork County Board in 1887. The draw for the opening fixtures took place on 10 December 2006. The championship began on 7 April 2007 and ended on 28 October 2007.

Nemo Rangers entered the championship as the defending champions.

On 28 October 2007, Nemo Rangers won the championship following a 0-12 to 0-09 defeat of Ilen Rovers in the final. This was their 16th championship title overall and their third title in succession.

Nemo's James Masters was the championship's top scorer with 2-29.

== Team changes ==
=== To Championship ===
Promoted from the Cork Premier Intermediate Football Championship

- St. Vincent's

=== From Championship ===
Relegated to the Cork Premier Intermediate Football Championship

- Mallow
- St Michael's

== Results ==
=== Preliminary round ===
7 April 2007 Preliminary round	Aghada	0-09 - 0-12	Dohenys	Ovens
	C Fleming 0-4, S O'Keeffe 0-3, T O'Keeffe 0-1, P O'Neill 0-1.		D Nyhan 0-4, D O'Mahony 0-3, D O'Sullivan 0-3, G McCarthy 0-2.

=== Round 1 ===
14 April 2007 Round 1	Ilen Rovers	1-11 - 3-20	Nemo Rangers	Clonakilty
	K O'Sullivan 0-6, S Casey 1-1, C O'Driscoll 0-3, J Wycherley 0-1.		J Masters 1-9, A Cronin 0-5, D Mehigan 1-0, M Cronin 1-0, S O'Brien 0-3, P Kerrigan 0-2, P Morgan 0-1.

14 April 2007 Round 1	St. Nicholas'	3-10 - 2-09	Carbery Rangers	Charlie Hurley Park, Bandon
	P O'Brien 1-2, J Kearney 0-5, G Moylan 1-0, D Brosnan 1-0, R Brosnan 0-2, G Callinan 0-1.		S Hayes 1-2, J Hayes 0-5, M Moore 1-1, J Murphy 0-1.

14 April 2007 Round 1	Clonakilty	0-11 - 1-08	Ballincollig	Charlie Hurley Park, Bandon
	C Callanan 0-5, D Murphy 0-2, P Griffin 0-2, M O'Brien 0-1, B Walsh 0-1.		J Miskella 1-0, P O'Mahony 0-3, A Donovan 0-2, L O'Toole 0-2, J Kelly 0-1.

15 April 2007 Round 1	Castlehaven	1-12 - 1-11	Douglas	Clonakilty
	C Crowley 1-4, S Cahalane 0-6, D Hurley 0-1, D Hegarty 0-1.		S McCarthy 0-4, E Cadogan 1-0, J Farrell 0-2, M Harrington 0-1, B Fitzgerald 0-1, T Sheehan 0-1, C Dineen 0-1, F O'Sullivan 0-1.

15 April 2007 Round 1	Naomh Abán	1-09 - 0-12	Bantry Blues	Inchigeela
	D Ó Cróinín 1-1, M Ó Cróinín 0-3, A Ó Loingsigh 0-1, S Mac Cárthaigh 0-1, S Ó Cuill 0-1, A Ó Cróinín 0-1, D Ó Súilleabháin 0-1.		D Barron 0-5, D O'Neill 0-4, G Canty 0-1, N Canty 0-1, P Clifford 0-1.

17 April 2007 Round 1	St. Vincent's	1-08 - 1-10	Bishopstown	Páirc Uí Rinn, Cork
	JP Murphy 1-5, D O'Connor 0-1, D Duggan 0-1, W McCarthy 0-1.		B Healy 1-8, C Murphy 0-1, C O'Neill 0-1.

18 April 2007 Round 1	St. Finbarr's	1-04 - 0-08	Aghada	Clonmult Memorial Park, Midleton
	A Callanan 1-0, F Murray 0-3, R O'Mahony 0-1.		S O'Keeffe 0-3, G Melvin 0-2, T O'Keeffe 0-2, C Fleming 0-1.

20 April 2007 Round 1	O'Donovan Rossa	2-11 - 0-09	Na Piarsaigh	Cloughduv
	C McCarthy 0-6, P Nealon 1-1, R Long 1-1, S Carmody 0-1, N Kearney 0-1, C Crowley 0-1.		J Gardiner 0-5, D Gardiner 0-1, A Brady 0-1, C O'Sullivan 0-1, G Sheehan 0-1.

28 April 2007 Round 1 replay	Ballincollig	2-11 - 1-07	Clonakilty	Charlie Hurley Park, Bandon
	J Kelly 1-1, P O'Mahony 0-4, F Keohane 1-0, L O'Toole 0-2, P Kelly 0-1, J Miskella 0-1, A Donovan 0-1, C O'Sullivan 0-1.		P Griffin 1-1, C Murphy 0-3, C Callanan 0-3.

28 April 2007 Round 1 replay	Naomh Abán	1-09 - 0-09	Bantry Blues	Inchigeela
	D Ó Súilleabháin 1-2, M Ó Cróinín 0-5, D Ó Cróinín 0-1, C Ó Luasa 0-1.		D Barron 0-4, D O'Neill 0-2, D McGrath 0-1, J Canty 0-1, P Clifford 0-1.

=== Round 2 ===
5 June 2007 Round 2	Clonakilty	1-14 - 0-05	St. Finbarr's	Páirc Uí Rinn, Cork
	C Callanan 1-3, C Murphy 0-5, D Murphy 0-1, B Walsh 0-1, P Griffin 0-1, M O'Brien 0-1, C McManus 0-1, C O'Donovan 0-1.		F Murray 0-4, R Leahy 0-1.

5 June 2007 Round 2	Carbery Rangers	2-09 - 1-14	Na Piarsaigh	Cloughduv
	S Hayes 1-1, J Hayes 0-4, K McMahon 1-0, M Moore 0-1, N Hayes 0-1, J Fitzpatrick 0-1, S Hayes 0-1.		S Glasgow 1-5, S O'Connor 0-4, J Gardiner 0-3, D Gardiner 0-2.

6 June 2007 Round 2	St. Vincent's	0-10 - 0-12	Bantry Blues	Ballineen
	G O'Connor 0-3, JP Murphy 0-3, K Goulding 0-1, T O'Connell 0-1, J Canniffe 0-1, C Barry 0-1.		J Canty 0-3, J O'Neill 0-2, G Canty 0-2, D Barron 0-2, R Lynch 0-2, J Griffin 0-1.

9 June 2007 Round 2	Douglas	0-11 - 0-13	Ilen Rovers	Clonakilty
	M Harrington 0-4, S McCarthy 0-3, B Fitzgerald 0-2, C Dineen 0-1, F O'Sullivan 0-1.		K O'Sullivan 0-6, E Sheehy 0-2, B O'Sullivan 0-2, S Casey 0-1, J Wycherley 0-1, J Sheehy 0-1.

=== Relegation playoffs ===
23 June 2007	St. Finbarr's	2-16 - 2-15	Douglas	Páirc Uí Chaoimh, Cork
	K Murray 1-6, G McCarthy 1-3, G O'Connor 0-3, C McCarthy 0-1, R O'Mahony 0-1, R Curran 0-1, M Ryan 0-1.		S Moylan 1-5, E Cadogan 0-4, S McCarthy 1-0, M Harrington 0-2, B Fitzgerald 0-2, W Coveney 0-2.

6 July 2007	Carbery Rangers	3-09 - 1-12	Douglas	Newcestown
	J Hayes 1-4, K McMahon 1-2, S Hayes 1-1, J Fitzpatrick 0-1, B Shanahan 0-1.		S McCarthy 0-8, M Harrington 1-3, W Coveney 0-1.

13 October 2007	Douglas	0-11 - 0-08	St. Vincent's	Church Road, Blackrock
	M Harrington 0-5, A Barry 0-2, J Farrell 0-2, N Heffernan 0-1, B Fitzgerald 0-1.		JP Murphy 0-3, D O'Connor 0-2, C Barry 0-1, G O'Connor 0-1, W McCarthy 0-1.

27 September 2007	St. Finbarr's	0-13 - 0-06	St. Vincent's	Páirc Uí Rinn, Cork
	F Murphy 0-4, R Leahy 0-3, G Leahy 0-3, R O'Mahony 0-2, J O'Donoghue 0-1.		G O'Connor 0-3, D O'Connor 0-1, P O'Sullivan 0-1, C Barry 0-1.

13 October 2007	St. Finbarr's	2-08 - 0-13	Carbery Rangers	Charlie Hurley Park, Bandon
	R O'Mahony 1-1, R Leahy 1-1, R Curran 0-3, F Murray 0-2, C McCarthy 0-1.		J Hayes 0-7, D Hayes 0-3, S Hayes 0-2, K McMahon 0-1.

20 October 2007	Carbery Rangers	1-12 - 0-05	St Vincent's	Newcestown
	M Ronan 1-0, J Fitzpatrick 0-3, J Hayes 0-3, S Hayes 0-3, K McMahon 0-1, M O'Sullivan 0-1, J Murphy 0-1.		JP Murphy 0-2, G O'Connor 0-1, D Duggan 0-1, K Goulding 0-1.

=== Divisional/colleges section ===
14 April 2007 Round 1	Imokilly	0-08 - 1-16	Beara	Macroom
	D Wallace 0-3, P Cahill 0-2, C O'Reilly 0-1, B Hartnett 0-1, B Ó Tuama 0-1.		BJ O'Sullivan 0-6, KJ O'Sullivan 0-5, D O'Sullivan 1-0, J Goggin 0-2, A O'Sullivan 0-1, K O'Sullivan 0-1, D Wiseman 0-1.

15 April 2007 Round 1	Carbery	0-16 - 1-11	University College Cork	Brinny
	C Keane 0-5, R O'Mahony 0-3, M O'Driscoll 0-2, C O'Driscoll 0-2, T Twomey 0-1, C O'Sullivan 0-1, J Clancy 0-1, F Arnold 0-1.		C Daly 1-2, M O'Donoghue 0-4, F Goold 0-2, J Goold 0-1, P Corrigan 0-1, K Mulvihill 0-1.

16 April 2007 Round 1	Muskerry	1-10 - 1-10	Cork Institute of Technology	Coachford
	D O'Connell 1-1, P Dunlea 0-3, A Concannon 0-2, M O'Sullivan 0-1, T Kenny 0-1, G O'Halloran 0-1, N Buckley 0-1.		C O'Neill 1-1, B Sheehan 0-3, D Goulding 0-3, H Curran 0-1, R O'Connor 0-1, J McGillycuddy 0-1.

17 April 2007 Round 1	Seandún	1-06 - 0-10	Carrigdhoun	Páirc Liam Mhic Cárthaigh, Ballygarvan
	M Murphy 1-1, B McGinn 0-2, K Buckley 0-1, M Barry 0-1, M Mulconroy 0-1.		G White 0-3, J Kingston 0-3, P Murphy 0-1, W O'Brien 0-1, F Lynch 0-1, B Sweeney 0-1.

21 April 2007 Round 1	Avondhu	0-10 - 0-11	Duhallow	Glanworth
	A O'Brien 0-5, T Monaghan 0-2, E Pierce 0-1, D Relihan 0-1, P Kissane 0-1.		D O'Connor 0-5, N Cronin 0-3, G Murphy 0-2, B Dennehy 0-1.

24 April 2007 Round 1 replay	Muskerry	1-08 - 1-12	Cork Institute of Technology	Coachford
	D O'Connell 1-2, T Kenny 0-2, P Dunlea 0-1, M Hodge 0-1, DD Dorgan 0-1, J White 0-1.		Darran O'Sullivan 1-2, D Goulding 0-4, H Curran 0-2, B Sheehan 0-1, C O'Neill 0-1, P O'Flynn 0-1, Denis O'Sullivan 0-1.

9 May 2007 Round 2	Beara	0-08 - 1-07	Carbery	Ballineen
	BJ O'Sullivan 0-4, A O'Sullivan 0-2, J Goggin 0-1, D Carey 0-1.		C O'Driscoll 1-0, R Moloney 0-2, S Levis 0-1, M O'Driscoll 0-1, C Keane 0-1, T Twomey 0-1, D Aherne 0-1.

=== Round 3 ===
4 July 2007 Round 3	Naomh Abán	0-06 - 0-10	St. Nicholas'	Coachford
	M Ó Cróinín 0-3, G (Mór) Ó Loingsigh 0-1, Donncha Ó Cróinín 0-1, A Lynch 0-1.		G Moylan 0-4, J Kearney 0-3, R Brosnan 0-2, L Leahy 0-1.

=== Round 4 ===
8 June 2007 Round 4	O'Donovan Rossa	0-07 - 0-15	Carrigdhoun	Rosscarbery
	P Nealon 0-3, C McCarthy 0-2, R Long 0-1, J Werner 0-1.		F Lynch 0-6, P Murphy 0-2, R O'Sullivan 0-2, G White 0-2, B O'Keeffe 0-1, J Shanahan 0-1, G Spillane 0-1.

9 June 2007 Round 4	Carbery	0-06 - 2-15	Ballincollig	Inchigeela
	C Keane 0-3, C O'Driscoll 0-1, D Aherne 0-1, R Moloney 0-1.		J Miskella 1-3, J Kelly 1-2, A O'Donovan 0-3, C O'Sullivan 0-2, L O'Toole 0-2, J O'Brien 0-1, B Cotter 0-1, F Keohane 0-1.

6 July 2007 Round 4	Nemo Rangers	0-09 - 0-09	Clonakilty	Newcetsown
	J Masters 0-5, P Kerrigan 0-2, A Cronin 0-1, M Cronin 0-1.		C O'Donovan 0-3, C Murphy 0-2, P Griffin 0-2, C Callanan 0-1, M O'Brien 0-1.

7 July 2007 Round 4	Duhallow	1-07 - 0-08	Bantry Blues	Macroom
	B Dennehy 0-5, J Cott 1-0, D O'Connor 0-1, J Buckley 0-1.		D O'Neill 0-4, D Barron 0-3, J Harrington 0-1.

8 July 2007 Round 4	Ilen Rovers	1-14 - 0-06	Cork Institute of Technology	Newcestown
	K O'Sullivan 0-6, J Wycherley 1-2, C O'Driscoll 0-2, F Collins 0-1, D Coughlan 0-1, A Holland 0-1, B O'Sullivan 0-1.		B Sheehan 0-3, D Goulding 0-2, E Murnane 0-1.

8 July 2007 Round 4	Dohenys	0-14 - 0-11	Castlehaven	Wolfe Tone Park, Bantry
	G McCarthy 0-8, R O'Sullivan 0-1, M O'Donovan 0-1, D Nyhan 0-1, D Healy 0-1, M Milner 0-1, P McCarthy 0-1.		P Hurley 0-6, B Collins 0-2, L Collins 0-1, S Hurley 0-1, C Crowley 0-1.

25 August 2007 Round 4 replay	Nemo Rangers	1-09 - 0-11	Clonakilty	Newcestown
	P Kerrigan 0-5, D Kearney 1-1, S O'Brien 0-1, D Niblock 0-1, M Cronin 0-1.		C Callanan 0-3, C McManus 0-2, C Murphy 0-2, C O'Donovan 0-2, P Griffin 0-1, D Murphy 0-1.

5 September 2007 Round 4	Na Piarsaigh	2-11 - 1-09	Bishopstown	Páirc Uí Rinn, Cork
	S Glasgow 1-3, S O'Sullivan 1-1, J Gardiner 0-3, G Sheehan 0-2, C O'Sullivan 0-1, P Gould 0-1.		B Healy 0-5, P Cronin 1-0, J O'Shea 0-1, J O'Sullivan 0-1, C O'Neill 0-1 D Crowley 0-1.

30 September 2007 Round 4	Aghada	1-08 - 1-11	St. Nicholas'	Páirc Uí Rinn, Cork
	S O'Keeffe 0-4, V Morrissey 1-0, P O'Neill 0-1, T O'Neill 0-1, C Power 0-1, P Kilbane 0-1.		R Brosnan 0-4, N Harte 1-0, J Kearney 0-3, G Moylan 0-1, D Brosnan 0-1, P O'Brien 0-1, G Callinan 0-1.

=== Quarter-finals ===
30 September 2007 Quarter-final	Duhallow	2-08 - 0-13	Ballincollig	Doneraile
	B Dennehy 1-0, M Dilworth 1-0, N O'Sullivan 0-3, D O'Connor 0-3, J Buckley 0-1, N Cronin 0-1.		P O'Mahony 0-3, J Miskella 0-3, F Keohane 0-2, P Kelly 0-1, B Cotter 0-1, J Kelly 0-1, J O'Brien 0-1, C Weste 0-1.

30 September 2007 Quarter-final	Ilen Rovers	0-12 - 1-08	Dohenys	Rosscarbery
	K O'Sullivan 0-7, B O'Sullivan 0-2, Donie Duggan 0-1 C O'Driscoll 0-1, E Sheehy 0-1.		G McCarthy 1-4, D O'Sullivan 0-1, D O'Donovan 0-1, P Collins 0-1, M Milner 0-1.

30 September 2007 Quarter-final	Nemo Rangers	0-13 - 0-11	Na Piarsaigh	Páirc Uí Rinn, Cork
	J Masters 0-7, P Kerrigan 0-4, S O'Brien 0-1, P Morgan 0-1.		J Gardiner 0-4, D Gardiner 0-2, S Glasgow 0-2, A Brady 0-1, G Noonan 0-1, P Gould 0-1.

6 October 2007 Quarter-final	St. Nicholas'	2-09 - 1-08	Carrigdhoun	Páirc Uí Rinn, Cork
	P O'Brien 1-3, G Moylan 1-0, R Brosnan 0-3, J Kearney 0-2, D Cunningham 0-1.		G White 1-1, C Ó Conchúir 0-3, F Lynch 0-3, N Murphy 0-1.

=== Semi-finals ===
13 October 2007 Semi-final	Ilen Rovers	3-08 - 1-08	Duhallow	Páirc Uí Rinn, Cork
	C O'Driscoll 1-1, D Murphy 1-0, J Wycherley 1-0, K O'Sullivan 0-3, F Collins 0-1, D Coughlan 0-1, D Whooley 0-1, E Sheehy 0-1.		D O'Connor 1-4, M Dilworth 0-1, N O'Sullivan 0-1, N Cronin 0-1, J Buckley 0-1.

13 October 2007 Semi-final	Nemo Rangers	1-14 - 0-07	St. Nicholas'	Páirc Uí Rinn, Cork
	J Masters 1-8, M Cronin 0-1, S O'Brien 0-1, P Kerrigan 0-1, D Kearney 0-1, B O'Driscoll 0-1, A Cronin 0-1.		R Brosnan 0-3, J Kearney 0-3, N Horgan 0-1.

=== Final ===
28 October 2007 Final	Nemo Rangers	0-12 - 0-09	Ilen Rovers	Páirc Uí Chaoimh, Cork
	P Kerrigan 0-7, 4f; A Cronin 0-2; S O'Brien, P Morgan and D Kavanagh 0-1 each.	Report	K O'Sullivan (0-1f) and B O'Sullivan 0-3 each; D Coughlan, J Wycherly (free) and E Sheehy 0-1 each.	Referee: G Sweeney (Glenville)

== Championship statistics ==
=== Top scorers ===
Overall

Rank	Player	Club	Tally	Total	Matches	Average
1	James Masters	Nemo Rangers	2-29	35	6	5.83
2	Kevin O'Sullivan	Ilen Rovers	0-31	31	6	5.16
3	John Hayes	Carbery Rangers	1-23	26	5	5.20
4	Paul Kerrigan	Nemo Rangers	0-21	21	6	3.50

In a single game

Rank	Player	Club	Tally	Total	Opposition
1	James Masters	Nemo Rangers	1-09	12	Ilen Rovers
2	James Masters	Nemo Rangers	1-08	11	St. Nicholas'
2	Brian Healy	Bishopstown	1-08	11	St. Vincent's
3	Kevin Murray	St. Finbarr's	1-06	9	Douglas
4	J. P. Murphy	St. Vincent's	1-05	8	Bishopstown
4	Stephen Glasgow	Na Piarsaigh	1-05	8	Carbery Rangers
4	Stephen Moylan	Douglas	1-05	8	St. Finbarr's
4	Ger McCarthy	Dohenys	0-08	8	Castlehaven
4	Shane McCarthy	Douglas	0-08	8	Carbery Rangers
5	Colin Crowley	Castlehaven	1-04	7	Douglas
5	John Hayes	Carbery Rangers	1-04	7	Douglas
5	Ger McCarthy	Dohenys	1-04	7	Ilen Rovers
5	Donncha O'Connor	Duhallow	1-04	7	Ilen Rovers
5	John Hayes	Carbery Rangers	0-07	7	St. Finbarr's
5	Kevin O'Sullivan	Ilen Rovers	0-07	7	Dohenys
5	James Masters	Nemo Rangers	0-07	7	Na Piarsaigh
5	Paul Kerrigan	Nemo Rangers	0-07	7	Ilen Rovers
