= James Masters (Gaelic footballer) =

Cork Gaelic footballer (born 1982)

Personal information
- Native name: Séamus Mac Máistir (Irish)
- Born: 13 July 1982 (age 44) Cork, Ireland
- Occupation: Garda Síochána
- Height: 6 ft 0 in (183 cm)

Sport
- Sport: Gaelic football
- Position: Right corner forward
Club
Years	Club	Apps (scores)
2000–2015	Nemo Rangers	80 (18–308)
Club titles
- Cork titles: 8
- Munster titles: 5
- All-Ireland Titles: 1
Inter-county
Years	County	Apps (scores)
2005–2010	Cork	26 (6–80)
Inter-county titles
- Munster titles: 3
- All-Irelands: 0
- NFL: 1 (Division 2)
- All Stars: 0

James Masters (born 13 July 1982 in Cork, Ireland) is an Irish former Gaelic footballer who played for the Nemo Rangers club and at senior level for the Cork county team from 2005 until 2010.

== Biography ==
James Masters was born in Cork in 1982. He was educated locally at Coláiste Chríost Rí on the south side of the city. It was here that he first came to prominence as a hurler and a footballer on various school teams. In 2001, Masters was the star player for the coláiste when he scored nine points against St Colman's College to win the county colleges' title. He later studied at the Garda Síochána College in Templemore and currently works as a Garda in Crookstown.

== Playing career ==
=== Club ===
Masters played his club hurling and football with the Nemo Rangers club in Cork. He joined the senior panel in the early 2000s; however, he had to wait several years before he would make a big impact, due to the presence of stalwarts Joe Kavanagh and Colin Corkery playing in his favoured position. In 2002 Nemo reached the final of the provincial club championship. Masters came on as a substitute in that game as the club trounced Monaleen of Limerick by 4–15 to 0–6. It was Masters's first Munster Club SFC winners' medal. Despite his contributions, Masters played no part in Nemo's subsequent All-Ireland Club SFC victory on St Patrick's Day, 2003.

Two years later, in 2005, Masters had established himself on the full-forward line with Nemo. He won his first county senior championship title on the field of play that year as Muskerry were defeated by ten points. Masters later secured a second Munster club title; however, Nemo missed out on the ultimate success. In 2006 Nemo retained their county title, with Masters securing a second county championship medal. The club made it three-in-a-row in 2007, before claiming the Munster club title also. It was Masters's third winners' medal in the provincial series. The subsequent All-Ireland club final pitted Nemo against St Vincent's of Dublin. Masters was on the losing side on that occasion.

In 2008, Nemo and Masters made it four county championship titles in-a-row.

=== Inter-county ===
Masters first came to prominence on the inter-county scene as a member of the Cork minor football team in 2000. That year, as captain of the team, he won a Munster winners' medal in that competition following a 1–13 to 0–14 defeat of arch-rivals Kerry. Cork later qualified for the All-Ireland MFC final, with Mayo providing the opposition. A close game followed; however, at the full-time whistle Cork were the champions by 2–12 to 0–13. Not only did Masters collect an All-Ireland minor winners' medal that day but he also had the honour of collecting the cup on behalf of his county.

By 2001, Masters was too old to play in the minor grade; however, he was an automatic choice for the Cork under-21 team. That year he won a Munster title in that grade following a 1–12 to 0–8 defeat of Limerick. Cork were subsequently defeated in the All-Ireland semi-final. Masters had no further success with the county under-21 footballers.

In 2005, Masters became a full member of the Cork senior football team. That year he lined out in his first Munster SFC final. Reigning All-Ireland SFC champion Kerry provided the opposition on that occasion; however, Cork were beaten by 1–11 to 0–11. Cork remained in the championship following this defeat; however, both Cork and Kerry later met again in the All-Ireland SFC semi-final. That game turned into an absolute rout. Kerry won easily by 1–19 to 0–9.

In 2006, Cork lined out against Kerry in the Munster SFC final once again. That game ended in a 0–10 apiece draw. The replay saw a much fresher Cork team defeat Kerry by 1–12 to 0–9. Masters proved the hero of the day, as he scored 1–7. The quirks of the championship saw Cork face Kerry again in the subsequent All-Ireland SFC semi-final. In a similar pattern to previous encounters Cork failed to beat Kerry at Croke Park. A 0–16 to 0–10 resulted in Masters's side being defeated.

In 2007, Cork narrowly lost their Munster crown to Kerry. In spite of the 1–15 to 1–13 defeat Cork still had another chance to claim the All-Ireland SFC title. Cork later did well in the All-Ireland series and finally qualified for the championship decider. The opponent, however, was Kerry. While the first half was played on an even keel, 'the Kingdom' ran riot in the second half and a rout ensued. At the full-time whistle Cork were trounced by 3–13 to 1–9.

In 2008, Cork gained a modicum of revenge on Kerry when sides met in the Munster SFC final. Kerry were cruising by eight points at the interval; however, Cork stormed back in the second-half. Kerry could only muster three points as Cork secured a 1–16 to 1–11 victory. It was Masters's second Munster SFC winners' medal. Both sides met again in the All-Ireland SFC semi-final; however, after a draw and a replay Kerry advanced to the championship decider.

In 2009, Cork defeated Kerry in a replay of the provincial semi-final, thus securing a place for Masters's side in a fifth consecutive Munster SFC final. Limerick provided the opposition on that occasion, and, while many expected the game to be a foregone conclusion, Cork had to fight tooth-and-nail for every ball. For a while it looked as if Limerick would claim an historic victory; however, at the full-time whistle Cork got out of jail and won by just a single point. It was Masters's third Munster SFC winners' medal.

Masters decided to withdraw from the Cork panel in March 2010, citing his lack of game time as the reason. Masters had become a more peripheral figure in the Cork set up throughout 2009 with the emergence of younger players such as Colm O'Neill reducing him to the role of a substitute.

=== Province ===
Masters also lined out with Munster in the inter-provincial football competition. He first played with his province in 2005; however, Munster were defeated by Ulster at the semi-final stage.

== Career statistics ==
=== Club ===
Team	Season	Cork		Munster		All-Ireland		Total	
Team	Season	Apps	Score	Apps	Score	Apps	Score	Apps	Score
Nemo Rangers	2003-04	1	0-01	—		—		1	0-01
Nemo Rangers	2004-05	2	2-05	—		—		2	2-05
Nemo Rangers	2005-06	6	2-40	3	1-12	1	1-05	10	4-57
Nemo Rangers	2006-07	7	2-40	2	1-06	—		9	3-46
Nemo Rangers	2007-08	6	2-29	3	0-16	2	0-15	11	2-60
Nemo Rangers	2008-09	6	1-30	2	0-05	—		8	1-35
Nemo Rangers	2009-10	3	0-12	—		—		3	0-12
Nemo Rangers	2010-11	4	0-12	2	1-03	1	0-06	7	1-21
Nemo Rangers	2011-12	2	0-05	—		—		2	0-05
Nemo Rangers	2012-13	3	1-05	—		—		3	1-05
Nemo Rangers	2013-14	6	0-15	—		—		6	0-15
Nemo Rangers	2014-15	4	2-14	—		—		4	2-14
Nemo Rangers	2015-16	7	0-16	2	1-07	—		9	1-23

=== Inter-county ===
Team	Year	National League			Munster		All-Ireland		Total	
Team	Year	Division	Apps	Score	Apps	Score	Apps	Score	Apps	Score
Cork	2005	Division 1A	5	2-19	2	0-08	3	1-05	10	3-32
Cork	2006	Division 1A	4	0-10	3	1-21	2	0-08	9	1-39
Cork	2007	Division 1A	7	0-34	3	3-18	3	0-12	13	3-64
Cork	2008	Division 2	2	0-00	2	0-01	3	1-02	7	1-03
Cork	2009	Division 2	5	1-04	3	0-04	1	0-00	9	1-08
Cork	2010	Division 1	2	0-00	—		—		2	0-00
Total			25	3-67	13	4-52	12	2-27	50	9-146

=== Championship record ===
List of Appearances
#	Date	Venue	Opponent	Score	Result	W/L	Competition
1	12 June 2005	Cusack Park, Ennis	Clare	0–5	0–18 : 0–6	W	Munster SFC semi-final
2	10 July 2005	Páirc Uí Chaoimh, Cork	Kerry	0–3	0–11 : 1–11	L	Munster SFC final
3	30 July 2005	O'Moore Park, Portlaoise	Sligo	1–1	3–13 : 0–11	W	All-Ireland SFC Qualifiers R4
4	7 August 2005	Croke Park, Dublin	Galway	0–3	2–14 : 2–11	W	All-Ireland SFC quarter-final
5	28 August 2005	Croke Park, Dublin	Kerry	0–2	0–9 : 1–19	L	All-Ireland SFC semi-final
6	11 June 2006	Gaelic Grounds, Limerick	Limerick	0–8	0–9 : 0–5	W	Munster SFC semi-final
7	9 July 2006	FitzGerald Stadium, Killarney	Kerry	0–7	0–10 : 0–10	D	Munster SFC final
8	16 July 2006	Páirc Uí Chaoimh, Cork	Kerry	1–6	1–12 : 0–9	W	Munster SFC final replay
9	5 August 2006	Croke Park, Dublin	Donegal	0–3	1–11 : 1–10	W	All-Ireland SFC quarter-final
10	20 August 2006	Croke Park, Dublin	Kerry	0–5	0–10 : 0–16	L	All-Ireland SFC semi-final
11	20 May 2007	Páirc Uí Chaoimh, Cork	Limerick	1–7	2–14 : 0–7	W	Munster SFC quarter-final
12	3 June 2007	Gaelic Grounds, Limerick	Tipperary	2–7	2–18 : 0–10	W	Munster SFC semi-final
13	1 July 2007	FitzGerald Stadium, Killarney	Kerry	0–4	1–13 : 1–15	L	Munster SFC final
14	21 July 2007	O'Moore Park, Portlaoise	Louth	0–5	0–16 : 0–14	W	All-Ireland SHC Qualifiers R4
15	4 August 2007	Croke Park, Dublin	Sligo	0–4	1–11 : 0–8	W	All-Ireland SFC quarter-final
16	16 September 2007	Croke Park, Dublin	Kerry	0–3	1–9: 3–13	L	All-Ireland SFC final
17	8 June 2008	Gaelic Grounds, Limerick	Limerick	0–0	2–9 : 0–12	W	Munster SFC semi-final
18	6 July 2008	Páirc Uí Chaoimh, Cork	Kerry	0–1	1–16 : 0–11	W	Munster SFC final
19	10 August 2008	Croke Park, Dublin	Kildare	0–1	2–11 : 1–11	W	All-Ireland SFC quarter-final
20	24 August 2008	Croke Park, Dublin	Kerry	1–0	3–7 : 1–13	D	All-Ireland SFC semi-final
21	31 August 2008	Croke Park, Dublin	Kerry	0–1	2–13: 3–14	L	All-Ireland SFC semi-final replay
22	24 May 2009	Fraher Field, Dungarvan	Waterford	0–2	2–18 : 1–7	W	Munster SFC quarter-final
23	7 June 2009	FitzGerald Stadium, Killarney	Kerry	0–0	1–10 : 0–13	D	Munster SFC semi-final
24	13 June 2009	Páirc Uí Chaoimh, Cork	Kerry	0–1	1–17 : 0–12	W	Munster SFC semi-final replay
25	5 July 2009	Páirc Uí Chaoimh, Cork	Limerick	0–1	2–6 : 0–11	W	Munster SFC final
26	20 September 2009	Croke Park, Dublin	Kerry	0–0	1–9: 0–16	L	All-Ireland SFC final
