= Kevin O'Sullivan (Gaelic footballer) =

Irish Gaelic footballer

Personal information
- Born: Baltimore, County Cork
- Occupation: Bank official
- Height: 6 ft 1 in (185 cm)

Sport
- Sport: Gaelic football
- Position: Right corner-back
Club
- Years: Club
- 2002-present: Ilen Rovers
Club titles
- Cork titles: 0
Inter-county
| Years | County | Apps (scores) |
| 2004-2008 | Cork | 13 (0-8) |
Inter-county titles
- Munster titles: 2 (1 as sub)
- All-Irelands: 0
- NFL: 0
- All Stars: 0

Kevin O'Sullivan (born 1984 in Baltimore, County Cork) is an Irish sportsperson. He plays Gaelic football with his local club Ilen Rovers and was a member of the Cork senior inter-county team from 2004 until 2008.
