= 2001–02 All-Ireland Senior Club Football Championship =

Irish Football Championship

- Dates: 7 October 2001 – 17 March 2002
- Teams: 33
- Sponsor: Allied Irish Bank
- Champions: Ballinderry (1st title); Adrian McGuckin (captain); Brian McIver (manager)
- Runners-up: Nemo Rangers; Colin Corkery (captain); Billy Morgan (manager)

Tournament statistics
- Matches played: 38
- Top scorer(s): Tommy Gill (3-38)

The 2001–02 All-Ireland Senior Club Football Championship was the 32nd staging of the All-Ireland Senior Club Football Championship since its establishment by the Gaelic Athletic Association in 1970-71. The competition began on 7 October 2001 and ended on 17 March 2002.

The defending champion was Crossmolina Deel Rovers; however, the club did not qualify after being beaten in the Mayo County Championship.

On 17 March 2002, Ballinderry won the competition following a 2–10 to 0–9 defeat of Nemo Rangers in the All-Ireland final at Semple Stadium. It remains the club's only title.

== Connacht ==
=== Quarter-final ===
21 October 2001 Quarter-final	St Mary's	1-10 - 0-13	Allen Gaels	Markievicz Park
	M Breheny 0-7, J Davey 1-1, P Bree 0-1, J Campbell 0-1.		H Gibbons 0-7, P Kenny 0-2, A Cullen 0-1, J Gilbane 0-1, N Moran 0-1, G McWeeney 0-1.

27 October 2001 Quarter-final replay	Allen Gaels	0-12 - 0-14 (aet)	St Mary's	Páirc Seán Mac Diarmada
	A Cullen 0-5, P Kenny 0-4, H Gibbons 0-2, S McGuire 0-1.		M Breheny 0-9, J Davey 0-3, P Bree 0-2.

=== Semi-finals ===
4 November 2001 Semi-final	Charlestown	0-11 - 1-05	Roscommon Gaels	Fr O'Hara Park
	S Higgins 0-5, R Haran 0-2, M Caffrey 0-2, P Horkan 0-1, O Conway 0-1.		A Nolan 1-0, K Hegarty 0-3, D Costello 0-1, F O'Donnell 0-1.

11 November 2001 Semi-final	Annaghdown	0-12 - 0-11	St Mary's	Tuam Stadium
	M Newell 0-4, D Burke 0-4, J Mannion 0-2, PJ Fahy 0-1, M Melia 0-1.		M Breheny 0-7, R Bree 0-2, J Campbell 0-1, D Caffrey 0-1.

=== Final ===
25 November 2001 Final	Annaghdown	2-07 - 2-09	Charlestown	Tuam Stadium
	D Burke 1-1, S Kavanagh 1-0, M Newell 0-3, PJ Fahy 0-2, J Mannion 0-1.		P Horkan 2-0, R Haran 0-4, M Caffrey 0-3, S Higgins 0-1, P Mulligan 0-1.

== Leinster ==
=== First round ===
27 October 2001 First round	Garrycastle	1-09 - 2-11	St Anne's Rathangan	Páirc Chiaráin
	A Daly 1-3, G Dolan 0-4, D Ryan 0-1, P Dillon 0-1.		F Simpson 1-2, P Barry 0-5, R Barry 0-3, F Whelan 0-1.

28 October 2001 First round	Portarlington	1-09 - 1-08	Fr Manning Gaels	McCann Park
	G Burke 1-1, C Bennett 0-3, D O'Connor 0-2, P Maher 0-1, H Emerson 0-1, D Sweeney 0-1.		P Davis 1-6, G Hanniffy 0-2.

28 October 2001 First round	Rathnew	0-13 - 1-07	Newtown Blues	Aughrim County Ground
	T Gill 0-7, S Byrne 0-1, R Coffey 0-1, B Mernagh 0-1, D Byrne 0-1, R Dignam 0-1, T Doyle 0-1.		D Nugent 1-0, C Kelly 0-2, D McDonnell 0-2, P Stone 0-1, K Lynch 0-1, T Carr 0-1.

28 October 2001 First round	O'Hanrahan's	4-15 - 1-06	Muckalee	Dr Cullen Park
	P Kavanagh 1-5, B Walker 2-0, A Kavanagh 0-4, A Bowe 1-0, M Carpenter 0-3, D Bermingham 0-2, S Farrell 0-1.		J Dooley 1-0, J Maher 0-2, P Keegan 0-2, A Murphy 0-1, T Morrissey 0-1.

=== Quarter-finals ===
11 November 2001 Quarter-final	Portarlington	0-12 - 2-09	Na Fianna	McCann Park
	P Maher 0-3, D Sweeney 0-2, K Hoey 0-2, K McCann 0-2, G Burke 0-1, D O'Connor 0-1.		D Farrell 1-2, I Foley 1-2, J Sherlock 0-4, S Connell 0-1.

11 November 2001 Quarter-final	Rathnew	0-10 - 0-10	Dunshaughlin	Aughrim County Ground
	T Doyle 0-3, T Gill 0-3, R Coffey 0-2, R Dignam 0-1, A Mernagh 0-1.		R Kealy 0-3, M Reilly 0-3, D Crimmins 0-2, N Kelly 0-1, T Dowd 0-1.

11 November 2001 Quarter-final	O'Hanrahan's	0-06 - 0-07	Sarsfields	Dr Cullen Park
	P Kavanagh 0-2, G Walker 0-1, D Bermingham 0-1, M Carpenter 0-1, B Walker 0-1.		S McKenzie-Smyth 0-3, M Dunne 0-1, Dermot Earley 0-1, P Brennan 0-1, M Browne 0-1.

11 November 2001 Quarter-final	St. Anne's Rathangan	2-08 - 3-10	Edenderry	Enniscorthy
	R Barry 1-6, J Simpson 1-0, R Stafford 0-1, F Whelan 0-1.		C Farrell 1-3, P Brady 1-2, B Malone 1-1, M Keogh 0-2, C Reilly 0-1, S Óg Farrell 0-1.

18 November 2001 Quarter-final replay	Dunshaughlin	0-16 - 2-10 (aet)	Rathnew	Páirc Tailteann
	R Kealy 0-5, D Crimmins 0-3, M McHale 0-2, N Kelly 0-2, F Gogan 0-1, D Tonge 0-1, T Dowd 0-1, S Kelly 0-1.		T Gill 1-2, M Coffey 1-0, T Doyle 0-3, R Coffey 0-2, I Glynn 0-1, B Mernagh 0-1, A Mernagh 0-1.

25 November 2001 Quarter-final second replay	Rathnew	2-09 - 1-06	Dunshaughlin	Aughrim County Ground
	T Gill 1-4, A Mernagh 1-0, M Doyle 0-2, D Coffey 0-1, R Coffey 0-1, R Dignam 0-1.		T Dowd 1-0, D Kealy 0-2, N Kelly 0-1, R Kealy 0-1, M Reilly 0-1, D Crimmins 0-1.

=== Semi-finals ===
25 November 2001 Semi-final	Sarsfields	1-13 - 2-10	Na Fianna	Páirc Tailteann
	David Earley 1-3, P Brennan 0-5, J Whelan 0-2, B Moylan 0-2, S McKenzie-Smyth 0-1.		D Farrell 1-3, I Foley 1-1, J Sherlock 0-2, K Donnelly 0-1, P McGeeney 0-1, K McGeeney 0-1, S Connell 0-1.

2 December 2001 Semi-final replay	Sarsfields	1-08 - 3-11 (declared void)	Na Fianna	Páirc Tailteann
	P Brennan 0-5, S McKenzie-Smyth 1-1, M Browne 0-2.		J Sherlock 2-3, P McGeeney 1-0, S Connell 0-3, D Farrell 0-1, P McCarthy 0-1, K McGeeney 0-1, A Shearer 0-1, M Foley 0-1.

2 December 2001 Semi-final	Rathnew	1-10 - 0-10	Edenderry	St Conleth's Park
	T Gill 0-5, K Gill 1-1, R Coffey 0-2, M Doyle 0-1, B Mernagh 0-1.		C Reilly 0-2, M Keogh 0-2, K Guing 0-1, S Óg Farrell 0-1, B Malone 0-1, P Brady 0-1.

9 December 2001 Semi-final replay refixture	Sarsfields	1-18 - 2-17 (aet)	Na Fianna	Páirc Tailteann
	P Brennan 0-7, Dermot Earley 0-5, S McKenzie-Smyth 1-1, B Moylan 0-2, M Browne 0-1, M Freaney 0-1, David Earley 0-1.		I Foley 1-6, D Farrell 1-3, P McGeeney 0-2, K McGeeney 0-2, S Connell 0-2, S McGlinchey 0-1, M Foley 0-1.

=== Final ===
16 December 2001 Final	Rathnew	0-09 - 1-06	Na Fianna	St Conleth's Park
	T Gill 0-3, R Coffey 0-2, K Gill 0-1, A Murnagh 0-1, L Glynn 0-1, M Doyle 0-1.		D Farrell 1-0, I Foley 0-3, D Macken 0-1, K McGeeney 0-1, K Donnelly 0-1.

22 December 2001 Final replay	Rathnew	2-16 - 1-10	Na Fianna	St Conleth's Park
	T Gill 1-9, R Coffey 1-3, D Coffey 0-1, D Byrne 0-1, T Doyle 0-1, P Dignam 0-1.		J Sherlock 1-0, S Connell 0-2, K Donnelly 0-2, M Foley 0-2, I Foley 0-1, P McGeeney 0-1, D Macken 0-1, K McGeeney 0-1.

== Munster ==
=== Quarter-finals ===
27 October 2001 Quarter-final	Dromcollogher/Broadford	2-09 - 0-09	Stradbally	Dromcollogher
	M Reidy 1-5, R Lynch 1-1, J Daly 0-1, J Kelly 0-1, J Stokes 0-1.		N Curran 0-6, M Walsh 0-1, J Coffey 0-1, G Power 0-1.

27 October 2001 Quarter-final	Nemo Rangers	1-10 - 0-08	Doonbeg	Páirc Uí Rinn
	D Mehigan 1-1, C Corkery 0-4, JP O'Neill 0-1, G Murphy 0-1, M Cronin 0-1, A Morgan 0-1, A Cronin 0-1.		P Hehir 0-6, F McInerney 0-1, G Killeen 0-1.

=== Semi-finals ===
10 November 2001 Semi-final	Nemo Rangers	0-09 - 0-08	An Ghaeltacht	Páirc Uí Chaoimh
	C Corkery 0-4, A Cronin 0-1, N Corkery 0-1, K Cahill 0-1, J Kavanagh 0-1, M McCarthy 0-1.		A Mac Gearailt 0-2, D Ó Sé 0-2, D Ó Cinnéide 0-2, C Ó Dubhda 0-1, JJ Corduibh 0-1.

17 November 2001 Semi-final	Dromcollogher/Broadford	0-09 - 1-09	Fethard	Dromcollogher
	M Reidy 0-7, J Daly 0-2.		K O'Donnell 1-1, A Fitzgerald 0-2, T Sheehan 0-2, K Maher 0-1, W Morrissey 0-1, G Burke 0-1, B Burke 0-1.

=== Final ===
25 November 2001 Final	Fethard	0-10 - 1-11	Nemo Rangers	Barracks Field
	G Burke 0-3, K Maher 0-3, T Sheehan 0-2, JP Looby 0-2.		C Corkery 0-6, J Kavanagh 0-4, A Cronin 1-0, D Mehigan 0-1.

== Ulster ==
=== Preliminary round ===
7 October 2001 Preliminary round	Enniskillen Gaels	1-09 - 0-09	Crossmaglen Rangers	Brewster Park
	T Brewster 0-4, G McDermott 1-0, R McCabe 0-3, O McShea 0-1, R Judge 0-1.		O McConville 0-5, J Fitzpatrick 0-2, J McEntee 0-1, C Short 0-1.

=== Quarter-finals ===
7 October 2001 Quarter-final	Carrickmore	0-09 - 0-10	Mayobridge	Healy Park
	P Loughran 0-4, C McCallan 0-2, B Gormely 0-1, R Munroe 0-1, C McGurk 0-1.		M Walsh 0-4, B Coulter 0-3, M Barry 0-1, M Linden 0-1, G McMahon 0-1.

14 October 2001 Quarter-final	Castleblayney	1-11 - 0-09	Enniskillen Gaels	St. Mary's Park
	E Murphy 1-0, K Tavey 0-3, A Tavey 0-3, D McArdle 0-1, R McArdle 0-1, A Irwin 0-1, J Hughes 0-1, P Duffy 0-1.		T Brewster 0-4, R McCabe 0-2, R Judge 0-1, C Murphy 0-1, P Fitzpatrick 0-1.

14 October 2000 Quarter-final	St Gall's	1-08 - 2-05	Ballinderry	Casement Park
	S Burns 0-5, K McGourty 1-0, T O'Neill 0-1, K McGourty 0-1, C McCrossan 0-1.		D Bateson 1-1, E. Muldoon 1-0, C Gilligan 0-2, G Cassidy 0-1, D Conway 0-1.

21 October 2001 Quarter-final replay	Ballinderry	0-08 - 0-06	St Gall's	Watty Graham Park
	C Gilligan 0-4, G Cassidy 0-4.		S Burns 0-4, K McGourty 0-2.

28 October 2001 Quarter-final	Cavan Gaels	0-09 - 0-08	St Eunan's	Breffni Park
	N Collins 0-3, C Nelligan 0-2, E King 0-1, M Graham 0-1, P O'Donnell 0-1, D Reilly 0-1.		B Devenny 0-5, D McGinley 0-1, R Kavanagh 0-1, B Kilcoyne 0-1.

=== Semi-finals ===
4 November 2001 Semi-final	Ballinderry	2-12 - 2-04	Cavan Gaels	St Tiernach's Park
	D Conway 2-2, G Cassidy 0-5, C Gilligan 0-2, B Oscar 0-1, S Donnelly 0-1, E. Muldoon 0-1.		P O'Donnell 2-0, M Leddy 0-2, N Collins 0-1, C Nelligan 0-1.

4 November 2001 Semi-final	Castleblayney	1-06 - 3-06	Mayobridge	St Tiernach's Park
	K Tavey 1-4, D Loughman 0-1, J Hughes 0-1.		B Coulter 2-0, R Sexton 1-1, G McMahon 0-1, M Walsh 0-1, R Coulter 0-1, A Barry 0-1, M Barry 0-1.

=== Final ===
25 November 2001 Final	Ballinderry	1-10 - 1-07	Mayobridge	Casement Park
	E. Muldoon 1-0, D Conway 0-3, C Gilligan 0-2, A McGuckin 0-2, D Bateson 0-2, S Dpnnelly 0-1.		G McMahon 1-2, M Walsh 0-3, R Sexton 0-2.

== Quarter-final ==
9 December 2001 Quarter-final	Tír Chonaill Gaels	0-06 - 2-14	Ballinderry	Emerald GAA Grounds
	B McDonagh and D Gillespie (2fs) 0-2 each, N Quinn and B Quinn 0-1 each.		C Gilligan 0-5 (2f), A McGuckian 1-2, D Bateson 1-1, G Cassidy 0-3 (1f), D Conway, B McCusker and E. Muldoon 0-1 each.

== Semi-finals ==
24 February 2002 Semi-final	Ballinderry	1-09 - 0-07	Rathnew	Pearse Park
	C Gilligan 1-3, G Cassidy 0-4, A McGuckin 0-1, P Wilson 0-1.		T Gill 0-5, T Doyle 0-1, L Glynn 0-1.

2 March 2002 Semi-final	Nemo Rangers	0-09 - 0-07	Charlestown Sarsfields	MacDonagh Park
	C Corkery (0-9, eight frees).		P Mulligan (0-3), P Horkan (0-2), M Caffrey (0-1), S Higgins (0-1, free).

=== Final ===
17 March 2002 Final	Ballinderry	2-10 - 0-09	Nemo Rangers	Croke Park
	G Cassidy 1-4, D Bateson 1-1, D Conway 0-2; E. Muldoon 0-1; B McCusker 0-1, C Gilligan 0-1.	Report	C Corkery 0-4, G Murphy 0-1, D Kavanagh 0-1; JP O'Neill 0-1, J Kavanagh 0-1, S Callanan 0-1.

== Statistics ==
=== Top scorers ===
Overall

Rank	Player	Club	Tally	Total	Matches	Average
1	Tommy Gill	Rathnew	3-38	47	8	5.87
2	Colin Corkery	Nemo Rangers	0-27	27	5	5.40
2	Tommy Gill	Rathnew	3-38	47	8	5.87
3	Gerard Cassidy	Ballinderry	1-21	24	7	3.42
4	Mark Breheny	St Mary's	0-23	23	3	7.66
5	Ian Foley	Na Fianna	3-13	22	5	4.50
5	Conleith Gilligan	Ballinderry	1-19	22	7	3.14
6	Dessie Farrell	Na Fianna	4-08	20	3	5.00
7	Ronan Coffey	Rathnew	1-13	16	8	2.00
8	Darren Conway	Ballinderry	2-09	15	7	2.14
8	Michael Reidy	Dromcollogher/Broadford	1-12	15	2	7.50

In a single game

Rank	Player	Club	Tally	Total	Opposition
1	Tommy Gill	Rathnew	1-09	12	Na Fianna
2	Padraic Davis	Fr Manning Gaels	1-06	9	Portrarlington
2	Redmond Barry	St Anne's Rathangan	1-06	9	Edenderry
2	Ian Foley	Na Fianna	1-06	9	Sarsfields
2	Mark Breheny	St Mary's	0-09	9	Allen Gaels
2	Colin Corkery	Nemo Rangers	0-09	9	Charlestown Sarsfields
3	Darren Conway	Ballinderry	2-02	8	Cavan Gaels
3	Michael Reidy	Dromcollogher/Broadford	1-05	8	Stradbally
3	Pa Kavanagh	O'Hanrahan's	1-05	8	Muckalee

=== Miscellaneous ===
- Rathnew won the Leinster Club Championship for the first time in their history.
- Charlestown Sarsfields won the Connacht Club Championship title for the first time in their history.
