= 1998 Cork Senior Football Championship =

Gaelic football competition

- Dates: 1 May – 4 October 1998
- Teams: 16
- Sponsor: TSB Bank
- Champions: Bantry Blues (2nd title); Damian O'Neill (captain); Denis Cotter (manager)
- Runners-up: Duhallow; John Herlihy (captain); John Fintan Daly (manager)

Tournament statistics
- Matches played: 30
- Goals scored: 53 (1.77 per match)
- Points scored: 625 (20.83 per match)
- Top scorer(s): Mark O'Sullivan (5-20)

The 1998 Cork Senior Football Championship was the 110th staging of the Cork Senior Football Championship since its establishment by the Cork County Board in 1887. The draw for the opening fixtures took place on 14 December 1997. The championship began on 1 May 1998 and ended on 4 October 1998.

Beara entered the championship as the defending champions, however, they were defeated by Nemo Rangers in a second round replay.

On 4 October 1998, Bantry Blues won the championship following a 0-17 to 2-06 defeat of Duhallow in the final. This was their second championship title overall and their first title since 1995.

Duhallow's Mark O'Sullivan was the championship's top scorer with 5-20.

== Team changes ==
=== To Championship ===
Promoted from the Cork Intermediate Football Championship

- Douglas

== Results ==
=== First round ===
1 May 1998 First round	Seandún	1-08 - 1-11	Muskerry	Ballincollig
	J O'Flynn 1-3, K O'Connell 0-2, D O'Connell 0-1, K Hyland 0-1, K O'Sullivan 0-1.		M Twohig 1-0, A Dorgan 0-3, D Kelleher 0-2, P Dunlea 0-2, A O'Shea 0-2, SF Cronin 0-1, P Concannon 0-1.

2 May 1998 First round	O'Donovan Rossa	1-07 - 0-08	Carrigdhoun	St. James's Park, Ardfield
	J O'Driscoll 1-1, N Murphy 0-4, C McCarthy 0-1, M Twomey 0-1.		C O'Donovan 0-3, D Fleming 0-2, P Buckley 0-1, P Murphy 0-1, J Cummins 0-1.	Referee: R O'Sullivan (Kilmurry)

3 May 1998 First round	Bishopstown	0-14 - 0-12	University College Cork	Páirc Uí Rinn, Cork
	C Lucey 0-3, M Hayes 0-2, J Honohan 0-2, M Cogan 0-2, P McGrath 0-2, R Honohan 0-2, S Collins 0-1.		M Ó Cróinín 0-7, C Keane 0-2, S Downey 0-1, G Stack 0-1, L Murphy 0-1.	Referee: N Barrett (Carrigtwohill)

9 May 1998 First round	Avondhu	0-13 - 0-13	Ballincollig	Mourne Abbey
	E Pierce 0-4, J O'Sullivan 0-3, J O'Callaghan 0-3, P O'Connell 0-2, P Buckley 0-1.		P O'Mahony 0-4, J Kelleher 0-3, F Smith 0-2, E Long 0-2, F Keohane 0-1, L O'Toole 0-1.	Referee: J Motherway (Aghada)

9 May 1998 First round	Mallow	1-13 - 3-14	Carbery	Carrigaline
	J Walsh 1-5, R Sheehan 0-5, F McCormack 0-2, M O'Donovan 0-1.		N Crowley 1-4, J Cullinane 1-2, T Deasy 0-4, B O'Sullivan 1-0, M Cronin 0-2, M O'Sullivan 0-1, P Hegarty 0-1.	Referee: D Linehean (Nemo Rangers)

9 May 1998 First round	Glanmire	0-09 - 0-3	St. Finbarr's	Caherlag
	P Ryan 0-3, J Crowley 0-3, T Óg Lynch 0-2, P O'Callaghan 0-1.		F O'Mahony 0-1, F Murray 0-1, B Hurley 0-1.	Referee: J Cummins

10 May 1998 First round	Aghada	1-09 - 2-06	Clyda Rovers	Páirc Uí Rinn, Cork
	D Creedon 1-2, J O'Connell 0-4, Mick Lewis 0-2, Mark Lewis 0-1.		T McGlinchey 1-2, R Walsh 1-1, T O'Mullane 0-2, D Cronin 0-1.	Referee: J Kearney (Na Piarsaigh)

10 May 1998 First round	Na Piarsaigh	1-10 - 3-14	Bantry Blues	Macroom
	M Mullins 1-2, G Casey 0-3, S Óg Ó hAilpín 0-2, C Lynch 0-1, P O'Flynn 0-1, S Gardiner 0-1.		P Clifford 1-6, J Canty 2-0, D O'Shea 0-3, S Dineen 0-2, S McCarthy 0-1, P O'Rourke 0-1, E Sheehan 0-1.	Referee: R Murphy (Lyre)

10 May 1998 First round	Nemo Rangers	1-15 - 1-05	St. Nicholas'	Páirc Uí Rinn, Cork
	J Kavanagh 1-8, L O'Sullivan 0-3, G Murphy 0-2, A Cronin 0-1, N Corkery 0-1.		R Kelleher 1-1, B McSweeney 0-2, R Brosnan 0-1, T Murphy 0-1.	Referee: N Barrett (Carrigtwohill)

10 May 1998 First round	Douglas	0-12 - 1-09	Dohenys	Innishannon
	R Geary 0-6, D Larkin 0-3, J Farrell 0-1, E Coveney 0-1, D O'Callaghan 0-1.		T Buckley 0-5, K Murray 1-1, C Crowley 0-1, F Collins 0-1, M O'Donovan 0-1.	Referee: P Higgins (Ballincollig)

24 May 1998 First round replay	Avondhu	0-10 - 3-09	Ballincollig	Mourne Abbey
	E Pierce 0-4, J O'Sullivan 0-3, A Walsh 0-1, B O'Driscoll 0-1, G Kelleher 0-1.		F Keohane 2-0, P O'Mahony 0-6, J Kelleher 1-0, J Miskella 0-3.	Referee: R Murray (Lyre)

23 May 1998 First round replay	Aghada	1-13 - 1-10	Clyda Rovers	Páirc Uí Rinn, Cork
	C Counihan 1-2, Mark Lewis 0-4, A Berry 0-3, D Creedon 0-2, R Dwane 0-1, Mick Lewis 0-1.		N O'Mullane 1-0, C O'Sullivan 0-2, T McGlinchey 0-2, R Walsh 0-2, P O'Mullane 0-1, C Cronin 0-1, F Dorgan 0-1, T O'Mullane 0-1.	Referee: J Kearney (Na Piarsaigh)

23 May 1998 First round replay	Douglas	2-15 - 3-11 (aet)	Dohenys	Innishannon
	D Larkin 1-2, D O'Callaghan 1-1, E Coveney 0-3, R Geary 0-3, J Farrell 0-2, C McCarthy 0-1, J Grimes 0-1, B Finn 0-1, P Monaghan 0-1.		T Buckley 1-4, F Collins 1-1, D Deasy 0-4, K Farr 1-0, A O'Rourke 0-1, C Crowley 0-1.	Referee: P Higgins

=== Second round ===
24 May 1998 Second round	Castlehaven	1-17 - 0-10	Clonakilty	Sam Maguire Park, Dunmanway
	L Tompkins 1-4, B Deasy 0-4, B Collins 0-3, J Cleary 0-2, A Crowley 0-2, C Crowley 0-1, F Cahalane 0-1.		E O'Mahony 0-7, B Walsh 0-1, K Quirke 0-1, C Murray 0-1.	Referee: J Cummins

30 May 1998 Second round	Duhallow	2-09 - 0-12	Aghada	Ballyhooly
	M O'Sullivan 2-4, D Culloty 0-3, M Angland 0-1, A O'Sullivan 0-1.		Mick Lewis 0-4, Mark Lewis 0-2, J O'Connell 0-2, C O'Brien 0-1, D Creedon 0-1, D Devoy 0-1, M Crowley 0-1.	Referee: J Kearney (Na Piarsaigh)

30 May 1998 Second round	O'Donovan Rossa	2-09 - 0-12	Ballincollig	Clonakilty
	J Werner 1-2, C Keohane 1-2, J O'Driscoll 0-2, N McCarthy 0-1, B Casey 0-1, C McCarthy 0-1.		P O'Mahony 0-8, J Ring 0-1, L O'Toole 0-1, B O'Leary 0-1, J Miskella 0-1.	Referee: N Barrett (Carrigtwohill)

30 May 1998 Second round	Beara	1-08 - 0-11	Nemo Rangers	Rossa Park, Skibbereen
	S Deane 1-1, C O'Sullivan 0-4, J O'Sullivan 0-3.		J Kavanagh 0-5, S Calnan 0-1, L O'Sullivan 0-1, C McCarthy 0-1, L Kavanagh 0-1, S O'Brien 0-1.	Referee: M Collins (Clonakilty)

7 June 1998 Second round	Bishopstown	0-09 - 1-10	Muskerry	Ballincollig
	C Lucey 0-3, P McGrath 0-2, L Honohan 0-1, P Murray 0-1, M Cogan 0-1, M Hayes 0-1.		A O'Shea 1-2, A Dorgan 0-3, N Twomey 0-3, S Coughlan 0-1, C Murphy 0-1.	Referee: J Motherway (Aghada)

7 June 1998 Second round	Imokilly	1-10 - 1-06	Glanmire	Clonmult Memorial Park, Midleton
	D Barrett 0-4, JJ Kearney 1-0, B Kearney 0-2, M O'Keeffe 0-1, M Daly 0-1, J O'Connell 0-1, M Walsh 0-1.		G Murphy 1-1, J Crowley 0-2, P Ryan 0-1, C O'Leary 0-1, T Óg Lynch 0-1.	Referee: G Harrington (Carrigaline)

7 June 1998 Second round	Cork Institute of Technology	3-07 - 1-16	Bantry Blues	Inchigeela
	E O'Connell 2-0, M Moore 1-1, A Constable 0-3, P McCarthy 0-2, O Crowley 0-1.		D O'Shea 1-4, P Clifford 0-4, P O'Rourke 0-3, J Canty 0-2, E Sheehan 0-1, S McCarthy 0-1, S Dineen 0-1.	Referee: P Higgins (Ballincollig)

13 June 1998 Second round	Douglas	0-08 - 0-11	Carbery	Kinsale
	R Geary 0-3, D Larkin 0-2, D O'Callaghan 0-1, P Barry 0-1, E Coveney 0-1.		N Crowley 0-3, T Deasy 0-3, K Daly 0-1, J Crowley 0-1, F Collins 0-1, J Cullinane 0-1, J Whooley 0-1.	Referee: G Harrington (Carrigaline)

19 July 1998 Second round replay	Beara	0-05 - 2-14	Nemo Rangers	Rossa Park, Skibbereen
	S Spencer 0-2, JL O'Sullivan 0-1, C O'Sullivan 0-1, O O'Sullivan 0-1.		J Kavanagh 1-4, C Corkery 0-5, C McCarthy 1-0, S Fahy 0-1, L O'Sullivan 0-1, M Cronin 0-1, K Cahill 0-1, S Calnan 0-1.	Referee: M Collins (Clonakilty)

=== Quarter-finals ===
18 July 1998 Quarter-final	Castlehaven	0-12 - 0-08	O'Donovan Rossa	Clonakilty
	J Cleary 0-6, B Collins 0-2, B Deasy 0-1, A Crowley 0-1, L Tompkins 0-1, C Crowley 0-1.		J O'Driscoll 0-3, C McCarthy 0-1, D Davis 0-1, N McCarthy 0-1, D Spring 0-1, B Deasy 0-1.	Referee: J Cummins (Glanworth)

25 July 1998 Quarter-final	Duhallow	2-10 - 0-11	Carbery	Carrigadrohid
	M O'Sullivan 2-5, D O'Sullivan 0-2, JP O'Neill 0-1, J Herlihy 0-1, J Buckley 0-1.		J Crowley 0-3, N Crowley 0-2, P Crowley 0-1, J Whooley 0-1, T Deasy 0-1, P Hegarty 0-1, P Nolan 0-1, K Daly 0-1.	Referee: N Barrett (Carrigtwohill)

26 July 1998 Quarter-final	Bantry Blues	0-19 - 0-06	Imokilly	Cloughduv
	D O'Shea 0-5, P Clifford 0-4, S McCarthy 0-3, P O'Rourke 0-2, M Moran 0-2, D O'Neill 0-1, S Dineen 0-1, E Sheehan 0-1.		D Barrett 0-2, P Cahill 0-1, G Manley 0-1, C McSweeney 0-1, N O'Connor 0-1.	Referee: R O'Sullivan (Kilmurry)

22 August 1998 Quarter-final	Nemo Rangers	2-13 - 1-09	Muskerry	Charlie Hurley Park, Bandon
	C Corkery 1-4, C McCarthy 1-3, J Kavanagh 0-2, K Cahill 0-1, S Calnan 0-1, S Fahy 0-1, S O'Brien 0-1.		J O'Driscoll 1-1, J McCarthy 0-3, P Concannon 0-2, N Twomey 0-1, D Kelleher 0-1, A O'Shea 0-1.	Referee: M Collins (Clonakilty)

=== Semi-finals ===
16 August 1998 Semi-final	Bantry Blues	1-13 - 0-06	Castlehaven	Sam Maguire Park, Dunmanway
	P Clifford 1-3, D O'Shea 0-4, J Canty 0-2, E Canty 0-1, P O'Regan 0-1, D O'Neill 0-1, S Dineen 0-1.		J Cleary 0-3, B Deasy 02-, A Crowley 0-1.	Referee: R O'Sullivan (Kilmurry)

5 September 1998 Semi-final	Duhallow	1-09 - 0-12	Nemo Rangers	Macroom
	M O'Sullivan 1-2, J Buckley 0-3, D O'Sullivan 0-2, JP O'Neill 0-1, D Culloty 0-1.		C Corkery 0-7, J Kavanagh 0-2, L O'Sullivan 0-2, S Calnan 0-1.	Referee: N Barrett (Carrigtwohill)

19 September 1998 Semi-final replay	Duhallow	1-09 - 1-08	Nemo Rangers	Macroom
	J Buckley 1-1, M O'Sullivan 0-3, D Buckley 0-2, JP O'Neill 0-1, S Walsh 0-1, D O'Sullivan 0-1.		C Corkery 1-5, C McCarthy 0-1, S Fahy 0-1, G Murphy 0-1.	Referee: N Barrett (Carrigtwohill)

=== Final ===
4 October 1998 Final	Bantry Blues	0-17 - 2-06	Duhallow	Páirc Uí Chaoimh, Cork
	P Clifford 0-6, D O'Shea 0-4, D O'Neill 0-2, P O'Rourke 0-2, S McCarthy 0-1, M Moran 0-1, A O'Shea 0-1.		JP O'Neill 2-1, M O'Sullivan 0-4, D Buckley 0-1.	Attendance: 14,084; Referee: J Cummins (Glanworth)

== Championship statistics ==
=== Top scorers ===
Overall

Rank	Player	Club	Tally	Total	Matches	Average
1	Mark O'Sullivan	Duhallow	5-20	35	5	7.00
2	Philip Clifford	Bantry Blues	2-23	29	5	5.80
3	Joe Kavanagh	Nemo Rangers	2-21	27	6	4.50
3	Colin Corkery	Nemo Rangers	2-21	27	4	6.75
5	Declan O'Shea	Bantry Blues	1-20	23	5	4.60
6	Podsie O'Mahony	Ballincollig	0-18	18	3	6.00
7	Tim Buckley	Dohenys	1-09	12	2	6.00
7	Noel Crowley	Carbery	1-09	12	3	4.00
7	Ronan Geary	Douglas	0-12	12	3	4.00
10	Colin McCarthy	Nemo Rangers	2-05	11	6	1.83
10	John Cleary	Castlehaven	0-11	11	3	3.66

In a single game

Rank	Player	Club	Tally	Total	Opposition
1	Mark O'Sullivan	Duhallow	2-05	11	Carbery
1	Joe Kavanagh	Nemo Rangers	1-08	11	St. Nicholas'
3	Mark O'Sullivan	Duhallow	2-04	10	Aghada
4	Philip Clifford	Bantry Blues	1-06	9	Na Piarsaigh
5	John Walsh	Mallow	1-05	8	Carbery
5	Colin Corkery	Nemo Rangers	1-05	8	Duhallow
5	Podsie O'Mahony	Ballincollig	0-08	8	O'Donovan Rossa
8	J. P. O'Neill	Duhallow	2-01	7	Bantry Blues
8	Noel Crowley	Carbery	1-04	7	Mallow
8	Tim Buckley	Dohenys	1-04	7	Douglas
8	Larry Tompkins	Castlehaven	1-04	7	Clonakilty
8	Declan O'Shea	Bantry Blues	1-04	7	CIT
8	Joe Kavanagh	Nemo Rangers	1-04	7	St. Finbarr's
8	Colin Corkery	Nemo Rangers	1-04	7	Muskerry
8	Mícheál Ó Cróinín	UCC	0-07	7	Bishpstown
8	Eoin O'Mahony	Clonakilty	0-07	7	Castlehaven
8	Colin Corkery	Nemo Rangers	0-07	7	Duhallow
