= 1993 All-Ireland Senior Football Championship final =

- Event: 1993 All-Ireland Senior Football Championship
Derry	Cork
1-14 (17)	2-8 (14)
- Date: 19 September 1993
- Venue: Croke Park, Dublin
- Man of the Match: Johnny McGurk
- Referee: Tommy Howard (Kildare)
- Attendance: 64,500

The 1993 All-Ireland Senior Football Championship final was the 106th All-Ireland Final and the deciding match of the 1993 All-Ireland Senior Football Championship. The match was played in Croke Park in Dublin on 19 September 1993.

Ulster champions Derry took on Munster champions Cork, in what was their first ever meeting in a final. Cork's last title had come in 1990, while Derry had never won the competition, and last contested a final in 1958. Derry won the match by 1–14 to 2–8 to win the Sam Maguire Cup for the first time.

== Match summary ==
Derry won their first and only All-Ireland with a Seamus Downey goal. Cork's Tony Davis was sent off harshly.

Henry Downey captained the victorious Derry team.

== Match details ==
19 September 1993
15:30 IST (UTC+1)

Derry	1-14 – 2-8	Cork
Enda Gormley 0-6 (0-3f), Seamus Downey 1-0, Anthony Tohill 0-3 (0-2f), Johnny McGurk 0-2, Brian McGilligan 0-1, Joe Brolly 0-1, Dermot McNicholl 0-1		Colin Corkery 0-5 (0-4f), Joe Kavanagh 1-1 (0-1f), John O'Driscoll 1-0, Tony Davis 0-1, Shea Fahy 0-1

Croke Park, Dublin
Attendance: 64,500
Referee: Tommy Howard (Kildare)

Derry	Cork

1	Damien McCusker
2	Kieran McKeever
3	Tony Scullion
4	Fergal McCusker
5	Johnny McGurk
6	Henry Downey (c)
7	Gary Coleman
8	Anthony Tohill
9	Brian McGilligan
10	Dermot Heaney
11	Damian Barton
12	Damian Cassidy	(substituted off) HT'
13	Joe Brolly
14	Seamus Downey	(substituted off) 58'
15	Enda Gormley
Substitutes:
16	Don Kelly
17	Danny Quinn
18	Dermot McNicholl	(substituted in) HT'
19	Karl Diamond
20	Éamonn Burns	(substituted in) 58'
21	Declan Bateson
22	Brian McCormick
23	Richard Ferris
24	Stephen Mulvenna
Manager:
Eamonn Coleman

1	John Kerins
2	Brian Corcoran
3	Mark O'Connor
4	Niall Cahalane
5	Ciarán O'Sullivan
6	Steven O'Brien
7	Tony Davis	SO 35'
8	Shea Fahy
9	Teddy McCarthy	(substituted off) HT'
10	Don Davis
11	Joe Kavanagh
12	Barry Coffey
13	Colin Corkery	(substituted off) 66'
14	John O'Driscoll
15	Mick McCarthy (c)	(substituted off) 63'
Substitutes:
16	Kevin O'Dwyer
17	Mark Farr
18	Conor Counihan	(substituted in) 66'
19	Danny Culloty	(substituted in) HT'
20	Liam Honohan
21	John Cleary	(substituted in) 63'
22	Paul Coleman
23	Pat Hegarty
24	Brian Murphy
Manager:
Billy Morgan

== Aftermath ==
Derry's manager that day was Eamonn Coleman. When Coleman died in 2007, the All-Ireland winning squad formed a guard of honour at his funeral.

Cork player Joe Kavanagh, who also played in their 1999 defeat to Meath, described 1999 as being as bad as 1993.
