= Fachtna Collins =

Irish Gaelic footballer

Personal information
- Native name: Fachtna Ó Coileáin (Irish)
- Born: 1973 (age 52–53) Aughadown, County Cork, Ireland
- Occupation: Veterinary surgeon
- Height: 6 ft 4 in (193 cm)

Sport
- Sport: Gaelic football
- Position: Midfielder
Clubs
- Years: Club
- Ilen Rovers → Carbery
Club titles
- Cork titles: 0
College
- Years: College
- 1991-1996: University College Dublin
College titles
- Sigerson titles: 1
Inter-county
| Years | County | Apps (scores) |
| 1996-2001 | Cork | 10 (1-03) |
Inter-county titles
- Munster titles: 1
- All-Irelands: 0
- NFL: 1
- All Stars: 0

Fachtna Collins (born 1973) is an Irish former Gaelic footballer. At club level he played with Ilen Rovers divisional side Carbery and was also a member of the Cork senior football team.

== Career ==
Collins first played Gaelic football at juvenile and underage levels with the Ilen Rovers club. He also lined out as a schoolboy with St. Fachtna's De La Salle College in Skibbereen and, after winning consecutive Corn Uí Mhuirí titles, won a Hogan Cup medal in 1991. As a student at University College Dublin, Collins captained the senior team to the Sigerson Cup title in 1996.

Collins progressed to adult level with his club and won numerous South West JAFC titles before winning a Cork JAFC title in 2001 and a Cork IAFC title in 2003. He was at midfield when Ilen Rovers beat St. Michael's to win the inaugural All-Ireland ICFC title in 2004. Collins also lined out with divisional side Carbery.

Collins first played for Cork as a member of the minor team that beat Mayo in the 1991 All-Ireland minor final. He later claimed All-Ireland honours as a member of the junior team in 1993 and with the under-21 team in 1994. Collins's performances with the junior team earned a call-up to the senior team in 1996. He won National League and Munster Championship titles in 1999, however, Cork were beaten by Meath in that year's All-Ireland final.

== Honours ==
St. Fachtna's De La Salle College

- Hogan Cup: 1991
- Corn Uí Mhuirí: 1990, 1991

University College Dublin

- Sigerson Cup: 1996 (c)

Ilen Rovers

- All-Ireland Intermediate Club Football Championship: 2004
- Munster Intermediate Club Football Championship: 2003
- Cork Intermediate Football Championship: 2003
- Cork Junior A Football Championship: 2001
- South West Junior A Football Championship: 1996, 1999, 2000, 2001

Cork

- Munster Senior Football Championship: 1999
- National Football League: 1998–99
- All-Ireland Junior Football Championship: 1993
- Munster Junior Football Championship: 1993
- All-Ireland Under-21 Football Championship: 1994
- Munster Under-21 Football Championship: 1994
- All-Ireland Minor Football Championship: 1991
- Munster Minor Football Championship: 1991
