= Donal O'Callaghan (Gaelic footballer) =

Irish Gaelic footballer

Personal information
- Native name: Dónal Ó Ceallacháin (Irish)
- Born: 1973 Douglas, County Cork, Ireland

Sport
- Sport: Gaelic football
- Position: Right corner-back
Clubs
- Years: Club
- Douglas → Seandún
Club titles
- Cork titles: 0
Inter-county
Years	County	Apps (scores)
1995-1996	Cork	1 (0-00)
Inter-county titles
- Munster titles: 1
- All-Irelands: 0
- NFL: 0
- All Stars: 0

Donal O'Callaghan (born 1973) is an Irish former Gaelic footballer. At club level, he played with Douglas and at inter-county level with the Cork senior football team.

== Career ==
O'Callaghan began his club career at juvenile and underage levels with Douglas before progressing to adult level. He captained the intermediate team to the Cork IFC title in 1997 after a 0-09 to 1-03 win over Castletownbere in a replay. O'Callaghan was also selected for the Seandún divisional team.

At inter-county level, O'Callaghan first appeared for Cork as a member of the minor team that won the All-Ireland MFC title in 1991, after a 1-09 to 1-07 win over Mayo in the final. He later progressed to the under-21 team and added an All-Ireland U21FC medal to his collection after a 1-12 to 1-05 defeat of Mayo in the 1994 All-Ireland under-21 final. O'Callaghan later spent a number of seasons with the senior team and won a Munster SFC medal as a panel member in 1995.

== Honours ==
Douglas

- Cork Intermediate Football Championship: 1997 (c)

Cork

- Munster Senior Football Championship: 1995
- All-Ireland Under-21 Football Championship: 1994
- Munster Under-21 Football Championship: 1994
- All-Ireland Minor Football Championship: 1991
- Munster Minor Football Championship: 1991
