= Tadhg Óg Lynch =

Irish Gaelic footballer

Personal information
- Native name: Tadhg Óg Ó Loingsigh (Irish)
- Born: 1973 Glanmire, County Cork, Ireland
- Occupation: Account manager

Sport
- Sport: Gaelic football
- Position: Centre-back
Clubs
- Years: Club
- Glanmire; Sarsfields
Club titles
- Cork titles: 0
Inter-county
Years	County	Apps (scores)
1994-1996	Cork	0 (0-00)
Inter-county titles
- Munster titles: 0
- All-Irelands: 0
- NFL: 0
- All Stars: 0

Tadhg Óg Lynch (born 1973) is an Irish camogie manager and former Gaelic footballer and hurler. At club level, he played with Glanmire and Sarsfields and at inter-county level with the Cork senior football team.

== Playing career ==
Lynch played Gaelic football with Glanmire, while he lined out in hurling with sister club Sarsfields. He was part of the Sarsfields senior team beaten by Imokilly in the 1997 Cork SHC final.

At inter-county level, Lynch first appeared for Cork as a member of the minor team that won the All-Ireland MFC title in 1991, after a 1-09 to 1-07 win over Mayo in the final. He later progressed to the under-21 team and added an All-Ireland U21FC medal to his collection after a 1-12 to 1-05 defeat of Mayo in the 1994 All-Ireland under-21 final. Lynch later spent a number of seasons with the senior team.

== Coaching career ==
Lynch was manager of the Sarsfields senior camogie team that won the Cork SCC title after a 1-11 to 0-09 win over Seandún in 2023. The team later claimed the Munster Club SCC title after a defeat of Drom-Inch.

== Honours ==
=== Player ===
Cork

- All-Ireland Under-21 Football Championship: 1994 (c)
- Munster Under-21 Football Championship: 1994 (c)
- All-Ireland Minor Football Championship: 1991
- Munster Minor Football Championship: 1991

=== Management ===
Sarsfields

- Munster Senior Club Camogie Championship: 2023
- Cork Senior Camogie Championship: 2023
