= John Clifford (Gaelic footballer) =

Irish Gaelic footballer

Personal information
- Native name: Seán Ó Clúmháin (Irish)
- Born: 1974 Kilmurry, County Cork, Ireland

Sport
- Sport: Gaelic football
- Position: Right wing-forward
Clubs
- Years: Club
- Kilmurry → Muskerry
Club titles
- Cork titles: 0
College
- Years: College
- University College Cork
College titles
- Sigerson titles: 2
Inter-county
Years	County	Apps (scores)
1995	Cork	0 (0-00)
Inter-county titles
- Munster titles: 1
- All-Irelands: 0
- NFL: 0
- All Stars: 0

John Clifford (born 1974) is an Irish Gaelic football manager and former player. At club level, he played with Kilmurry, divisional side Muskerry and at inter-county level with the Cork senior football team.

== Playing career ==
Clifford began his club career at juvenile and underage levels with Kilmurry before progressing to adult level. He was also selected for the Muskerry divisional team and lined out in the Cork SFC. Clifford also played with University College Cork and won back-to-back Sigerson Cup medals in 1994 and 1995.

At inter-county level, Clifford first appeared for Cork as a member of the minor team that won the All-Ireland MFC title in 1991, after a 1-09 to 1-07 win over Mayo in the final. He later progressed to the under-21 team and added an All-Ireland U21FC medal to his collection after a 1-12 to 1-05 defeat of Mayo in the 1994 All-Ireland under-21 final. Clifford later spent a number of seasons with the senior team and won a Munster SFC medal as a panel member in 1995.

== Coaching career ==
Clifford has also become involved in team management and coaching.

== Honours ==
University College Cork

- Sigerson Cup: 1994, 1995

Cork

- Munster Senior Football Championship: 1995
- All-Ireland Under-21 Football Championship: 1994
- Munster Under-21 Football Championship: 1994
- All-Ireland Minor Football Championship: 1991
- Munster Minor Football Championship: 1991
