= Damian O'Neill (Gaelic footballer) =

Irish Gaelic footballer

Personal information
- Native name: Damian Ó Néill (Irish)
- Born: 1973 Bantry, County Cork, Ireland
- Occupation: Company director

Sport
- Sport: Gaelic football
- Position: Midfield
Club
- Years: Club
- Bantry Blues
Club titles
- Cork titles: 2
College
- Years: College
- Cork RTC
College titles
- Sigerson titles: 0
Inter-county
Years	County	Apps (scores)
1996-1999	Cork	3 (1-05)
Inter-county titles
- Munster titles: 1
- All-Irelands: 0
- NFL: 1
- All Stars: 0

Damian O'Neill (born 1973) is an Irish former Gaelic footballer. At club level, he played with Bantry Blues and at inter-county level with the Cork senior football team.

== Career ==
O'Neill began his club career at juvenile and underage levels with Bantry Blues. He won back-to-back Cork U21AFC medals while simultaneously progressing to adult level. He claimed his first adult silverware in 1993 when he won a Cork IFC medal after a 0-12 to 0-10 win over Ballincollig in the final. O'Neill captained Bantry Blues to the Cork SFC title in 1995 after a 0-10 to 0-08 win over Muskerry in the final. He won a second Cork SFC medal in 1998 when he once again captained Bantry to a 0-17 to 2-06 defeat of Duhallow in the final.

At inter-county level, O'Neill first appeared for Cork as a member of the minor team that won the All-Ireland MFC title in 1991, after a 1-09 to 1-07 win over Mayo in the final. He later progressed to the under-21 team and added an All-Ireland U21FC medal to his collection when he captained the team to a 1-12 to 1-05 defeat of Mayo in the 1994 All-Ireland under-21 final.

O'Neill was drafted onto the senior team during the 1996–97 National Football League. His senior tenure was blighted by a series of injuries, including a cruciate ligament injury in May 1997. O'Neill was part of the Cork team that won the National League title after a defeat of Dublin in the final. He was appointed captain the senior team for the championship, however, injury ruled him out of the team. O'Neill was a member of the extended panel for Cork's defeat by Meath in the 1999 All-Ireland final.

== Personal life ==
O'Neill's uncle, Declan Barron, won an All-Ireland SFC medal with Cork in 1973.

== Honours ==
Bantry Blues

- Cork Senior Football Championship: 1995, 1998
- Cork Intermediate Football Championship: 1993
- Cork Under-21 A Football Championship: 1993, 1994

Cork

- Munster Senior Football Championship: 1999
- National Football League: 1998–99
- All-Ireland Under-21 Football Championship: 1994 (c)
- Munster Under-21 Football Championship: 1994 (c)
- All-Ireland Minor Football Championship: 1991
- Munster Minor Football Championship: 1991

Sporting positions
Preceded by Ciarán O'Sullivan	Cork senior football team captain 1999	Succeeded by Philip Clifford
Achievements
Preceded by Thomas Hanley	All-Ireland Under-21 Football Final winning captain 1994	Succeeded by Denis O'Dwyer
