= 2001 All-Ireland Senior Football Championship final =

2001 All-Ireland Football Championship final
- Event: 2001 All-Ireland Senior Football Championship
Galway	Meath
0–17	0–8
- Date: 23 September 2001
- Venue: Croke Park, Dublin
- Referee: Michael Collins (Cork)
- Attendance: 70,482

The 2001 All-Ireland Senior Football Championship final was the 114th All-Ireland Final and the deciding match of the 2001 All-Ireland Senior Football Championship (SFC), an inter-county Gaelic football tournament for the top teams in Ireland.

Galway defeated Meath. Neither side contested a final again until Galway's semi-final victory over Derry in 2022.

== Competition structure ==
Each of the 32 traditional counties of Ireland is represented by a county side. Every county, except Kilkenny, participated in the 2001 All-Ireland SFC. The "overseas county" of New York also participated, while London played no part in the competition due to the outbreak of Foot-and-mouth disease. Each county in Ireland is located in a province; for the purpose of the All-Ireland SFC, London and New York are located in Connacht. The 2001 All-Ireland SFC began with the four provincial championships – knock-out competitions between county sides in the same province. The four winners of these championships progressed automatically to the All-Ireland SFC quarter-finals. The sides which did not win a provincial championship entered the All-Ireland SFC qualifiers to determine which other four teams would play in the quarter-finals. New York, however, only competed in the provincial championship.

== Background ==
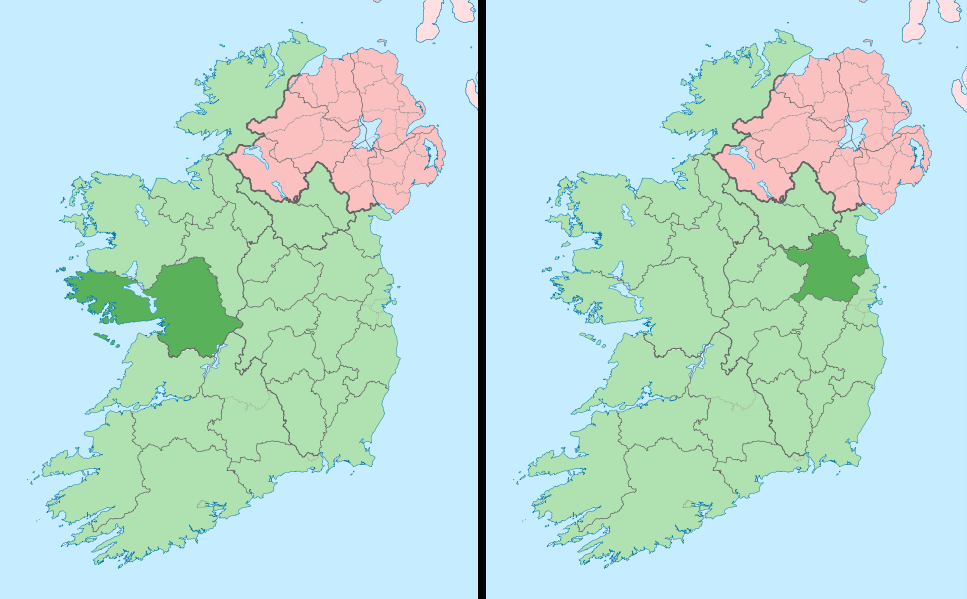
Galway (left) and Meath (right) shown within Ireland

The 2001 championship was the first to feature the qualifying system, in which sides who had not won their provincial championship competed for the right to join the provincial winners in the "All-Ireland series". Galway, who had lost to Roscommon in the Connacht Championship semi-final, thus became the first side to contest an All-Ireland Final having not won their provincial championship.

Galway had previously contested the final on 21 occasions, winning 8 times (in 1925, 1934, 1938, 1956, 1964, 1965, 1966 and 1998), and losing on 13 occasions, the most recent of which was the previous year. They were appearing in the final for the third time in four years. Meath had won the title 7 times (in 1949, 1954, 1967, 1987, 1988, 1996 and 1999), and lost on 8 occasions. Manager Seán Boylan had been in charge for 8 of Meath's previous final appearances, including replays.

The two counties had not played each other in the championship since 1970, when Meath won by four points. In 1966, the sides contested the final.

Earlier in 2001, Galway lost the National Football League final against Mayo.

== Routes to the final ==
=== Galway ===
Round	Opposition	Score^{Note 1}
2nd qualifying round	Wicklow	3–12 – 1–9
3rd qualifying round	Armagh	0–13 – 0–12
4th qualifying round	Cork	1–14 – 1–10
Quarter-final	Roscommon	0–14 – 1–5
Semi-final	Derry	1–14 – 1–11

In previous years, Galway, having lost to Roscommon in the Connacht Senior Football Championship (SFC) semi-final, would have played no part in the All-Ireland series as they did not win their provincial championship. However, the introduction of the qualifier system this year gave them a second opportunity to reach the final. The county entered at the second qualifying round, against Wicklow, and with further victories against Armagh and Cork, joined Meath at the quarter-final stage.

Going into the final quarter of their semi-final against Derry, Galway were trailing by five points, but ultimately won the game 1–14 (seventeen points) to 1–11 (fourteen points). Derry had named an unchanged line-up from their quarter-final against Tyrone, while Galway initially did not name anyone at right wing-forward as they were waiting on fitness reports for Jarlath Fallon and Paul Clancy; Fallon went on to start the game. Galway were leading 0–5 – 0–4 when Enda Muldoon scored Derry's goal in the 26th minute. Matthew Clancy scored Galway's goal in the 66th minute.

=== Meath ===
Round	Opposition	Score^{Note 2}
Quarter-final	Westmeath	2–12 – 3–9
Quarter-final replay	Westmeath	2–10 – 0–11
Semi-final	Kerry	2–14 – 0–5

Meath won the year's Leinster Senior Football Championship (SFC), by virtue of victories against Westmeath, Kildare and Dublin, to seal their place in an All-Ireland SFC quarter-final.

Meath were drawn against Westmeath in that All-Ireland SFC quarter-final, and Galway were scheduled to play Roscommon; both of these fixtures were repeats of matches played in the provincial championships. There was no repeat of Galway's earlier defeat as they triumphed 0–14 to 1–5 (eight points) in Castlebar. Westmeath, who had lost to Meath by a single point in the Leinster SFC, were leading Meath by nine points on 20 minutes, but the game eventually finished a 2–12 (eighteen points) – 3–9 (eighteen points) draw (Meath score given first). Despite having Hank Traynor sent off, Meath won the replay 2–10 (sixteen points) – 0–11.

Meath reached the All-Ireland SFC final following a 2–14 (twenty points) to 0–5 victory against the defending champions Kerry. Kerry, who started the game with all but two of the players who won the title the previous year, only managed to score a single point in the second half. Meath's line-up was unchanged from the previous round; only 2 players did not start the 1999 final. John McDermott scored Meath's first goal towards the end of the first half to give his side a five-point lead at the break. The lead was extended to eleven points, following six unanswered points at the beginning of the second half. John Cullinane scored Meath's second goal in the 66th minute; an earlier goal was disallowed for an infringement on the square ball rule. Kerry's Éamonn Fitzmaurice was sent off late in the game.

== Pre-match ==
Meath were expected to win their eighth All-Ireland SFC title.

Referee Michael Collins had also officiated Galway's semi-final match.

Galway's hurlers contested the 2001 All-Ireland Senior Hurling Championship final on 9 September, but lost to Tipperary. Alan Kerins, a dual player who started the hurling final, was named as a substitute for the football final. The Galway and Tipperary managers complained about the condition of the Croke Park pitch following the hurling final; a few days later, Croke Park spokesman Danny Lynch stated every effort was being made to prepare the pitch for the football final. The new Hogan Stand of the stadium was under construction at the time.

The build-up to the final was overshadowed by the September 11 attacks. The atmosphere in Galway and Meath was more muted than it would normally be leading up to an All-Ireland SFC final.

== Match ==
Galway won easily, their second title in four years. At full-time it was Galway 0–17 : 0–8 Meath.

In the All-Ireland Minor Football Championship final, held just before the senior game, Tyrone and Dublin drew 0–15 – 1–12.

Meath, who announced their starting line-up on their then recently launched website a couple of days before the final, started with the same fifteen players who began the semi-final against Kerry. All but two of the side had started the final two years previously; Richie Kealey and Ray McGee replaced Paddy Reynolds and Enda McManus.

=== Summary ===
The first half lacked quality play. Both sides scored six points, but also amassed many wides. Galway's Donnellan sent two frees wide.

Meath's Ollie Murphy was substituted on 45 minutes after breaking a finger. Nigel Nestor was sent off following a second yellow card shortly afterwards, with Meath trailing by two points. In the 59th minute, with the score 0–13 – 0–8, Trevor Giles missed a penalty for Meath. Some commentators suggested John McDermott dived to win the penalty. Pádraic Joyce scored ten points for Galway, nine of which came in the second half. Meath's full-forwards had little of the ball - they only amassed two wides during the game, and only scored two points in the second half.

=== Details ===
23 September 2001

Galway	0–17 – 0–08	Meath
P Joyce (0–10); J Bergin (0–2); P Clancy (0–2); M Donnellan (0–1); J Fallon (0–1); D Meehan (0–1)	Report	R McGee (0–2); N Crawford (0–1); J Cullinane (0–1); T Giles (0–1); E Kelly (0–1); J McDermott (0–1); O Murphy (0–1)

Croke Park, Dublin
Attendance: 70,482
Referee: Michael Collins (Cork)

Galway	Meath

Galway:
1	Alan Keane
2	Kieran Fitzgerald
3	Gary Fahey (c)
4	Richard Fahey
5	Declan Meehan
6	Tomás Mannion
7	Seán Óg De Paor
8	Kevin Walsh
9	Michael Donnellan
10	Paul Clancy
11	Jarlath Fallon
12	Joe Bergin	(substituted off) 71'
13	Derek Savage
14	Pádraic Joyce
15	Tommy Joyce	(substituted off) 71'
Substitutes:
21	Alan Kerins	(substituted on) 71'
23	Kieran Comer	(substituted on) 71'
Manager:
John O'Mahony

Meath:
1	Cormac Sullivan
2	Mark O'Reilly
3	Darren Fay
4	Cormac Murphy	(substituted off) 57'
5	Donal Curtis
6	Nigel Nestor	(yellow card) 50' (yellow-red card)
7	Hank Traynor
8	Nigel Crawford
9	John McDermott
10	Evan Kelly
11	Trevor Giles (c)
12	Richie Kealy	(substituted off) 50'
13	Ollie Murphy	(substituted off) 45'
14	Graham Geraghty
15	Ray Magee	(substituted off) 70'
Substitutes:
Paddy Reynolds	(substituted on) 45'
John Cullinane	(substituted on) 50'
Niall Kelly	(substituted on) 57'
Adrian Kenny	(substituted on) 70'
Manager:
Seán Boylan

Galway subs not used

16 Pádraig Lally
17 Michael Comer
18 Tomás Meehan
19 Mícheál Ó Callaráin
20 Seán Ó Domhnaill
22 Matthew Clancy
24 John Donnellan

Meath subs not used

16 D. Gallagher
18 P. Shankey
21 D. Kealy
23 M. O'Dowd
24 J. Devine

== Post-match ==
With 10 points during the match, Pádraic Joyce was named as the man of the match.

The Galway side returned to the county the day after the final. They made appearances in Ballinasloe, Tuam and Galway city, where a civic reception was held, to greet fans. The city's mayor, Donal Lyons, said Galway people across the world were proud when watching the side. More than 10,000 fans gathered in Tuam.

Tomás Mannion announced his retirement after the final.

== Notes ==
^{Note 1} Galway score given first.
^{Note 2} Meath score given first.
