= Paul Coleman =

Paul Coleman may refer to:

- Paul Coleman (basketball) (1915–1995), American basketball player
- Paul Coleman (Gaelic footballer) (born 1968), Irish retired Gaelic footballer
- Paul Coleman (sailor), American competitive sailor
- Paul J. Coleman (1932–2019), American space scientist

== See also ==
- Paul Colman (born 1967), British–Australian musician
