= 1999 All-Ireland Senior Football Championship final =

- Event: 1999 All-Ireland Senior Football Championship
Meath	Cork
1–11 (14)	1–8 (11)
- Date: 26 September 1999
- Venue: Croke Park, Dublin
- Man of the Match: Mark O'Reilly
- Referee: Mick Curley (Galway)
- Attendance: 63,276
- Weather: Dry

The 1999 All-Ireland Senior Football Championship final was the 112th All-Ireland Final and the deciding match of the 1999 All-Ireland Senior Football Championship, an inter-county Gaelic football tournament for the top teams in Ireland. Meath, captained by Graham Geraghty, defeated Cork to claim the last All-Ireland SFC title of the Millennium.

This was the last All-Ireland SFC final to be held with the old Hogan Stand in place at Croke Park.

== Pre-match ==
Meath had "unquestionably" played more key games at Croke Park in the 1990s than any other Leinster county.

Cork's Seán Óg Ó hAilpín went into the match aiming to emulate Teddy McCarthy's achievement of winning two senior All-Ireland championship medals in the same season.

== Match ==
=== Summary ===
Meath won by three points, recovering from the double blow of a penalty miss and the concession of a spectacular Joe Kavanagh goal at the start of the second half to eventually take control and win in style. It was Trevor Giles that missed the penalty. Kevin O'Dwyer, in the Cork goal, saved the penalty which was low to his left. If Giles had scored, Meath would have been two goals clear—Cork counterattacked, scored a point, then a goal.

Cork had almost 60% of the possession and were in control of the game for most of the first half, yet still lost. The average age of the Cork team was just over 23. Trevor Giles scored a crucial 45 eleven minutes from the end; the score put Meath one point ahead. Graham Geraghty captained Meath to victory and raised the Sam Maguire Cup aloft. The manager of the Meath team that day was Seán Boylan. Giles was viewed as "dictating the shape of the large picture like a director of epic movies." The performance of Meath's Mark O'Reilly was also praised.

"Some of the widest wides ever seen in Croke Park this century" occurred during the game.

=== Details ===
26 September 1999
Final

Meath	1–11 - 1–8	Cork
T. Giles 0–4, O. Murphy 1–0, E. Kelly, G. Geraghty 0–3 each, D. Curtis 0–1	Report	P. Clifford 0–5, J. Kavanagh 1–1, Mark O'Sullivan, P. O'Mahony 0–1 each

Croke Park, Dublin
Attendance: 63,226
Referee: Mick Curley (Galway)

==== Meath ====
- 1 C. Sullivan
- 2 M. O'Reilly
- 3 D. Fay
- 4 C. Murphy
- 5 P. Reynolds
- 6 E. McManus
- 7 H. Traynor
- 8 N. Crawford
- 9 J. McDermott
- 10 E. Kelly
- 11 T. Giles
- 12 N. Nestor
- 13 O. Murphy
- 14 G. Geraghty (c)
- 15 D. Curtis

Subs
R. Kealy for Nestor
B. Callaghan for Traynor
T. Dowd for Kelly

Manager
S. Boylan

==== Cork ====
- 1 K. O'Dwyer
- 2 R. McCarthy
- 3 S. Óg Ó hAilpín
- 4 A. Lynch
- 5 C. O'Sullivan
- 6 O. Sexton
- 7 M. Cronin
- 8 N. Murphy
- 9 Micheál O'Sullivan
- 10 M. Ó Cróinín
- 11 J. Kavanagh
- 12 P. O'Mahony
- 13 P. Clifford (c)
- 14 D. Davis
- 15 Mark O'Sullivan

Subs used
20 F. Murray for ?
19 F. Collins for ?
17 M. O'Donovan for ?

Subs not used
16 A. Quirke
18 M. O'Connor
21 B. J. O'Sullivan
22 B. Walsh
23 A. Dorgan
24 J. Miskella

Manager
L. Tompkins

== Post-match ==
Cork player Joe Kavanagh said it was as bad as the 1993 defeat.

Meath's second All-Ireland football title of the decade following their success in 1996, they were joint "team of the decade" for the 1990s with Down who won two titles in 1991 and 1994. Meath footballer Cormac Murphy, who afterwards expressed his relief that he had not retired before the game, said "I don't know. I don't think this achievement will make us team of the nineties. You have Down, you have Cork again, there have been a lot of good teams. Ask me again this time next year."
