= Mark O'Sullivan =

Mark O'Sullivan may refer to:

- Mark O'Sullivan (Gaelic footballer) (born 1973)
- Mark O'Sullivan (association footballer) (born 1983)
