= 1995 Cork Senior Football Championship =

Gaelic football competition

- Dates: 29 April 1995 – 8 October 1995
- Teams: 23
- Champions: Bantry Blues (1st title); Damian O'Neill (captain); Denis Cotter (manager)
- Runners-up: Muskerry; John O'Driscoll (captain); Colman Corrigan (manager)

Tournament statistics
- Matches played: 24
- Goals scored: 34 (1.42 per match)
- Points scored: 485 (20.21 per match)
- Top scorer(s): Jonathan McCarthy (0-24)

The 1995 Cork Senior Football Championship was the 107th staging of the Cork Senior Football Championship since its establishment by the Cork County Board in 1887. The draw for the opening round fixtures took place on 11 December 1994. The championship began on 29 April 1995 and ended on 8 October 1995.

Castlehaven were the defending champions, however, they were defeated by Beara in the second round.

On 8 October 1995, Bantry Blues won the championship following a 0–10 to 0–08 defeat of Muskerry in the final. This was their first championship title.

Mukserry's Jonathan McCarthy was the championship's top scorer with 0-24.

== Team changes ==
=== To Championship ===
Promoted from the Cork Intermediate Football Championship

- Ballincollig

== Results ==
=== First round ===
29 April 1995 First round	Carbery	2-07 - 0-05	Glanmire	Carrigadrohid
	P Hegarty 1-2, M Farr 1-0, T Crowley 0-2, M Cronin 0-1, D Lyons 0-1, B Harte 0-1.		K O'Neill 0-2, J Crowley 0-1, K Grandon 0-1, B O'Callaghan 0-1.	Referee: R O'Sullivan (Kilmurry)

29 April 1995 First round	Muskerry	0-16 - 1-08	Carrigdhoun	Páirc Uí Rinn, Cork
	J McCarthy 0-8, N Twomey 0-3, D Moss 0-2, P Coleman 0-1, J O'Driscoll 0-1, D Dwyer 0-1.		A Crowley 1-1, M Hickey 0-3, D Mullaney 0-1, G O'Sullivan 0-1, C O'Donovan 0-1, D Fitzgerald 0-1.	Referee: J Kearney (Na Piarsaigh)

29 April 1995 First round	Na Piarsaigh	0-11 - 1-09	University College Cork	Ballinlough
	M Mullins 0-7, T O'Sullivan 0-2, K Butterworth 0-1, P O'Flynn 0-1.		T Stack 1-1, J Clifford 0-4, P Burns 0-1, J Buckley 0-1, C Collins 0-1, S Moynihan 0-1.	Referee: E Murphy (Douglas)

30 April 1995 First round	Imokilly	0-05 - 0-16	Ballincollig	Páirc Uí Chaoimh, Cork
	J Corcoran 0-2, S Collins 0-1, D Barrett 0-1, J O'Connor 0-1.		F Keohane 0-5, L O'Toole 0-4, P O'Mahony 0-4, D Kelly 0-2, G Ring 0-1.	Referee: J O'Leary (Na Piarsaigh)

30 April 1995 First round	Mallow	1-08 - 1-09	Beara	Ballingeary
	K Buckley 1-0, J O'Mahony 0-3, M O'Donovan 0-2, S Browne 0-1, J Hayes 0-1, A Ahern 0-1.		O O'Sullivan 1-0, C O'Sullivan 0-3, M Harrington 0-2, P Hanley 0-1, R O'Dwyer 0-1, Michael O'Sullivan 0-1, D Healy 0-1.	Referee: M Collins (Clonakilty)

30 April 1995 First round	St. Nicholas'	1-08 - 1-08	Seandún	Páirc Uí Chaoimh, Cork
	K Hendricks 1-1, D Fagan 0-4, T Twomey 0-1, B O'Connell 0-1, J Lynch 0-1.		A Elliott 1-2, A Ryan 0-2, D Meade 0-1, K O'Connell 0-1, B Egan 0-1, M McElhinney 0-1.	Referee: D Linehan (Nemo Rangers)

7 May 1995 First round	Clonakilty	1-07 - 0-12	Cork Regional Technical College	Innishannon
	E O'Mahony 1-1, P Griffin 0-3, B Walsh 0-2, J Leahy 0-1.		J O'Connell 0-6, S Culloty 0-4, B O'Shea 0-1, F Cunningham 0-1.	Referee: G Harrington

22 May 1995 First round replay	St. Nicholas'	0-12 - 0-13	Seandún	Páirc Uí Rinn, Cork
	B O'Connell 0-4, D Cooper 0-2, V Hedderman 0-2, J Fox 0-1, T Browne 0-1, M Brosnan 0-1, J Lynch 0-1.		M McElhinney 0-3, J O'Driscoll 0-2, B Egan 0-2, K O'Connell 0-2, A Elliot 0-2, G O'Connor 0-1, P McCarthy 0-1.	Referee: N Barrett (Carrigtwohill)

=== Second round ===
13 May 1995 Second round	O'Donovan Rossa	1-12 - 0-13	Bishopstown	Charlie Hurley Park, Bandon
	B Casey 1-5, J O'Driscoll 0-3, B O'Donovan 0-1, D Davis 0-1, D O'Driscoll 0-1, M McCarthy 0-1.		P McGrath 0-6, P Cahill 0-4, L Honohan 0-1, B Murphy 0-1, D O'Mahony 0-1.	Referee: N Barrett (Carrigtwohill)

20 May 1995 Second round	Nemo Rangers	3-18 - 0-08	University College Cork	Páirc Uí Rinn, Cork
	J Kavanagh 1-4, C Corkery 0-6, S Calnan 1-3, P O'Donovan 1-1, N Corkery 0-2, K Cowhie 0-1, J Kerrigan 0-1.		J Clifford 0-3, J Crowley 0-2, R McCarthy 0-2, C Collins 0-1.	Referee: J Cummins (Glanworth)

20 May 1995 Second round	St. Finbarr's	0-07 - 2-06	Bantry Blues	Clonakilty
	T Power 0-3, M Comyns 0-3, M Buckley 0-1.		S Dineen 1-3, P Healy 1-0, P O'Rourke 0-1, M Moran 0-1, S McCarthy 0-1.	Referee: M Collins (Clonakilty)

21 May 1995 Second round	Castlehaven	0-06 - 0-11	Beara	Wolfe Tone Park, Bantry
	C Crowley 0-3, J Cleary 0-1, D Cahalane 0-1, E Cleary 0-1.		C O'Sullivan 0-8, S Spencer 0-1, D O'Sullivan 0-1, O o'Sullivan 0-1.	Referee: S O'Keeffe (St. Michael's)

28 May 1995 Second round	Aghada	2-11 - 1-13	Cork Regional Technical College	Páirc Uí Chonaill, Cobh
	J Murphy 1-1, M Lewis 0-4, D Creedon 1-0, R Lewis 0-3, J Motherway 0-2, S O'Keeffe 0-1.		S Culloty 1-6, J O'Connell 0-3, P McNamara 0-2, B O'Shea 0-1, F Cunningham 0-1.	Referee: J O'Leary (Na Piarsaigh)

2 July 1995 Second round	Muskerry	1-17 - 1-07	Seandún	Páirc Uí Rinn, Cork
	J McCarthy 0-9, G O'Leary 1-1, D Kelleher 0-2, P Concannon 0-2, N Twomey 0-1, D Moss 0-1, G McPolin 0-1.		R Geary 1-1, A Elliot 0-3, M McElhinney 0-1, B Egan 0-1, A Ryan 0-1.	Referee: J Cummins

2 July 1995 Second round	Avondhu	0-12 - 0-15	Carbery	Macroom
	J o'Sullivan 0-4, R Walsh 0-3, P Harrington 0-3, W O'Riordan 0-1, I O'Driscoll 0-1.		J Whooley 0-4, B Harte 0-3, T Crowley 0-2, D O'Donoghue 0-2, M Farr 0-1, J Cullinane 0-1, P Hegarty 0-1, K Ryan 0-1.	Referee: R Murphy (Lyre)

5 August 1995 Second round	Ballincollig	1-11 - 2-12	Duhallow	Ballyhooly
	P O'Mahony 0-6, J Kelleher 1-0, F Keohane 0-2, C O'Connell 0-2, F Smith 0-1.		M O'Sullivan 1-5, N O'Connor 1-3, J Dennehy 0-3, D Buckley 0-1.	Referee: N Barrett (Carrigtwohill)

=== Quarter-finals ===
29 July 1995 Quarter-final	Bantry Blues	0-11 - 1-08	Carbery	O'Donovan Rossa Park, Skibbereen
	S Dineen 0-6, P O'Rourke 0-2, M Moran 0-2, G Barry 0-1.		M Cronin 1-2, B Harte 0-3, P Nolan 0-1, J Whooley 0-1, P Hegarty 0-1.	Referee: S O'Keeffe (St. Michael's)

30 July 1995 Quarter-final	Muskerry	1-15 - 2-09	O'Donovan Rossa	Clonakilty
	N Twomey 1-2, J McCarthy 0-3, D Kelleher 0-2, P Coleman 0-2, C Murphy 0-1, S Coughlan 0-1, J O'Leary 0-1, P Concannon 0-1, S Prendeville 0-1, G O'Leray 0-1.		J O'Driscoll 1-3, B Casey 1-2, D Davis 0-2, I Breen 0-1, M McCarthy 0-1.	Referee: N Barrett (Carrigtwohill)

5 August 1995 Quarter-final	Nemo Rangers	2-16 - 1-06	Aghada	Páirc Séamus de Barra, Carrigtwohill
	P O'Donovan 1-4, N Corkery 1-2, S Fahy 0-5, P Lambert 0-2, S Calnan 0-1, E Fitzgerald 0-1, C Corkery 0-1.		D Creedon 1-0, M Lewis 0-3, N Berry 0-2, R Lewis 0-1.	Referee: J Cummins (Glanworth)

5 August 1995 Quarter-final replay	Bantry Blues	1-08 - 0-06	Carbery	O'Donovan Rossa Park, Skibbereen
	S McCarthy 1-0, S Dineen 0-3, M Moran 0-2, P O'Regan 0-1, K Harrington 0-1, D O'Neill 0-1.		D O'Donoghue 0-4, J Whooley 0-1, P Hegarty 0-1.	Referee: S O'Keeffe (St. Michael's)

2 September 1995 Quarter-final	Duhallow	1-09 - 0-11	Beara	Sam Maguire Park, Dunmanway
	J Dennehy 0-4, A Cronin 1-0, Mark O'Sullivan 0-3, A O'Sullivan 0-1, N O'Connor 0-1.		C O'Sullivan 0-4, Michael O'Sullivan 0-2, R O'Dwyer 0-1, P Hanley 0-1, A O'Regan 0-1, S Spencer 0-1, M Harrington 0-1.	Referee: M Collins (Clonakilty)

=== Semi-finals ===
10 September 1995 Semi-final	Bantry Blues	1-08 - 0-09	Duhallow	Macroom
	P Goggin 1-0, K Harrington 0-3, M Moran 0-2, P O'Rourke 0-2, D O'Neill 0-1.		M O'Sullivan 0-3, N O'Connor 0-3, J Herlihy 0-1, J Dennehy 0-1, P Murphy 0-1.	Referee: S O'Keeffe (St. Michael's)

23 September 1995 Semi-final	Muskerry	1-08 - 0-10	Nemo Rangers	Ballincollig
	J O'Driscoll 1-1, G O'Leary 0-3, D Moss 0-2, N Twomey 0-1, TJ O'Leary 0-1.		C Corkery 0-5, S Calnan 0-3, N Corkery 0-1, J Kavanagh 0-1.	Referee: N Barrett (Carrigtwohill)

=== Final ===
8 October 1995 Final	Bantry Blues	0-10 - 0-08	Muskerry	Páirc Uí Chaoimh, Cork
	K Harrington 0-4, S Dineen 0-2, S McCarthy 0-2, M Moran 0-1, P O'Rourke 0-1.		J McCarthy 0-4, N Twomey 0-2, J O'Driscoll 0-1, G O'Leary 0-1.	Attendance: 15,033; Referee: S O'Keeffe

== Championship statistics ==
=== Top scorers ===
Overall

Rank	Player	Club	Tally	Total	Matches	Average
1	Jonathan McCarthy	Muskerry	0-24	24	4	6.00
2	Stephen Dineen	Bantry Blues	1-14	17	5	3.40
3	Ciarán O'Sullivan	Beara	0-15	15	3	5.00
4	Mark O'Sullivan	Duhallow	1-11	14	3	4.66
5	Barry Casey	O'Donovan Rossa	2-07	13	2	6.50
5	Seán Culloty	Cork RTC	1-10	13	2	6.50
7	Noel Twomey	Muskerry	1-09	12	5	2.40
7	Colin Corkery	Nemo Rangers	0-12	12	3	4.00
9	Paul O'Donovan	Nemo Rangers	2-05	11	3	3.66
10	Niall O'Connor	Duhallow	1-07	10	3	3.33
10	Stephen Calnan	Nemo Rangers	1-07	10	3	3.33
10	Anthony Elliott	Seandún	1-07	10	3	3.33
10	Podsie O'Mahony	Ballincollig	0-10	10	2	5.00

In a single game

Rank	Player	Club	Tally	Total	Opposition
1	Seán Culloty	Cork RTC	1-06	9	Aghada
1	Jonathan McCarthy	Muskerry	0-09	9	Seandún
3	Barry Casey	O'Donovan Rossa	1-05	8	Bishopstown
3	Mark O'Sullivan	Duhallow	1-05	8	Ballincollig
3	Jonathan McCarthy	Muskerry	0-08	8	Carrigdhoun
3	Ciarán O'Sullivan	Beara	0-08	8	Castlehaven
7	Joe Kavanagh	Nemo Rangers	1-04	7	UCC
7	Paul O'Donovan	Nemo Rangers	1-04	7	Aghada
7	Mickey Mullins	Na Piarsaigh	0-07	7	UCC
10	Stephen Calnan	Nemo Rangers	1-03	6	UCC
10	Stephen Dineen	Bantry Blues	1-03	6	St. Finbarr's
10	Niall O'Connor	Duhallow	1-03	6	Ballincollig
10	John O'Driscoll	O'Donovan Rossa	1-03	6	Muskerry
10	John O'Connell	Cork RTC	0-06	6	Clonakilty
10	Paul McGrath	Bishopstown	0-06	6	O'Donovan Rossa
10	Podsie O'Mahony	Ballincollig	0-06	6	Duhallow
10	Colin Corkery	Nemo Rangers	0-06	6	UCC
10	Stephen Dineen	Bantry Blues	0-06	6	Carbery

== Championship statistics ==
=== Miscellaneous ===
- Bantry Blues win their first title.
- Bantry Blues qualify for the final for the first time since 1981
- Cork Regional Technical College field a team in the championship for the first time.
