= Brendan Walsh =

Brendan Walsh may refer to:

- Brendan Walsh (chef)
- Brendan Walsh (Gaelic footballer)
- Brendan Walsh (hurler)

== See also ==
- Brendon Walsh, American stand-up comedian and podcaster
