= 1937 Cork Junior Football Championship =

Irish Gaelic football competition

- Champions: Sarsfields (1st title)
- Runners-up: St Anne's

The 1937 Cork Junior Football Championship was the 39th staging of the Cork Junior Football Championship since its establishment by the Cork County Board in 1895.

The final was played on 16 January 1938 at the Douglas Grounds, between Sarsfields and St Anne's, in what was their first ever meeting in the final. Sarsfields won the match by 2–02 to 0–02 to claim their first ever championship title.

== Results ==
=== Final ===
16 January 1938 Final	Sarsfields	2-02 - 0-02	St Anne's	Douglas Grounds
