= David Hanrahan =

Irish Gaelic footballer

Personal information
- Native name: Daithí Ó hAnracháin (Irish)
- Born: 19 September 1992 (age 34) Douglas, Cork, Ireland
- Height: 6 ft 0 in (183 cm)

Sport
- Sport: Gaelic football
- Position: Goalkeeper
Club
- Years: Club
- Douglas
Club titles
- Cork titles: 0
Inter-county*
Years	County	Apps (scores)
2014-	Cork	0 (0-00)
Inter-county titles
- Munster titles: 0
- All-Irelands: 0
- NFL: 0
- All Stars: 0
- *Inter County team apps and scores correct as of 13:57, 26 July 2014.

David Hanrahan (born 19 September 1992) is an Irish Gaelic footballer who plays as a goalkeeper for the Cork senior team.

Born in Douglas, Cork, Hanrahan first arrived on the inter-county scene at the age of seventeen when he first linked up with the Cork minor team, before later joining the under-21 and junior sides. He made his senior debut during the 2014 National Football League. Since then Hanrahan has become a regular member of the panel.

At club level Hanrahan plays with Douglas.

== Honours ==
=== Team ===
Cork

- All-Ireland Junior Football Championship (1): 2013
- Munster Junior Football Championship (1): 2013
- Munster Under-21 Football Championship (1): 2013
- Munster Minor Football Championship (1): 2010
