= Ilen Rovers GAA =

Gaelic football club in County Cork, Ireland

Ilen Rovers
- Fánaithe na hAighlinne
- Founded: 1973
- County: Cork
- Colours
- Grounds: Rath Grounds; Páirc na hAidhlean
- Coordinates: 51°29′54.25″N 9°21′12.55″W

Playing kits
Standard colours

Senior Club Championships
	All Ireland	Munster champions	Cork champions
Ladies' football:	0	0	1

Ilen Rovers is a Gaelic Athletic Association club in West Cork, Ireland. The club is affiliated to the Carbery Board and the Cork County Board and is solely concerned with Gaelic football.

== History ==
Located on the River Ilen and encompassing the Aughadown, Rath and Baltimore areas in rural West Cork, Ilen Rovers GAA Club was founded in 1973. The club spent it's early years operating in the junior divisional ranks. Between 1996 and 2001, Ilen Rovers won four South West JAFC titles. The last of these divisional titles was subsequently converted into a Cork JAFC title, following a 0–14 to 1–04 win over Kinsale in the final.

Ilen Rovers celebrated its 30th anniversary in 2003 by winning the Cork IFC title, and thus securing senior status for the first time, following a 0–15 to 0–07 win over Carrigaline in the final. The club later defeated St Senan's to win the inaugural Munster Club IFC title. On 25 April 2004, Ilen Rovers beat St Michael's by 1–11 to 1–04 to claim the All-Ireland Club IFC title.

After just four years in the top flight, Ilen Rovers reached the 2007 Cork SFC final, however, they were beaten by 0–12 to 0–09 by Nemo Rangers.

== Honours ==
=== Men ===
- All-Ireland Intermediate Club Football Championship (1): 2004
- Munster Intermediate Club Football Championship (1): 2003
- Cork Intermediate Football Championship (1): 2003
- Cork Junior A Football Championship (1): 2001
- South West Junior A Football Championship (4): 1996, 1999, 2000, 2001
- South West Junior B Football Championship (2): 1983, 1988
- South West Junior D Football Championship (4): 1983, 1988, 1996, 2015
- South West Under-21 A Football Championship (3): 2009, 2016, 2018
- South West Under-21 B Football Championship (2): 1976, 1996
- Cork Minor A Football Championship (1): 2014
- South West Minor A Football Championship (2): 2011, 2014
- Cork Minor B Football Championship (2): 1995, 2010
- South West Minor B Football Championship (7): 1973, 1989, 1995, 1997, 2007, 2009, 2010

=== Women ===
- Cork Ladies' Senior Football Championship (1): 1986

== Notable players ==
- Fachtna Collins: All-Ireland MFC-winner (1991)
- Diarmuid Duggan: All-Ireland JFC-winner (2001)
- Kevin O'Sullivan: All-Ireland SFC runner-up (2007)
