= 1991 All-Ireland Under-21 Football Championship =

Gaelic football competition

Championship details

All-Ireland Champions
- Winning team: Tyrone (1st win)
- Captain: Peter Canavan

All-Ireland Finalists
- Losing team: Kerry

Provincial Champions
- Munster: Kerry
- Leinster: Meath
- Ulster: Tyrone
- Connacht: Leitrim

The 1991 All-Ireland Under-21 Football Championship was the 28th staging of the All-Ireland Under-21 Football Championship since its establishment by the Gaelic Athletic Association in 1964.

Kerry entered the championship as defending champions.

On 12 May 1991, Tyrone won the championship following a 4-16 to 1-5 defeat of Kerry in the All-Ireland final. This was their first All-Ireland title.

== Results ==
=== All-Ireland Under-21 Football Championship ===
Semi-finals

28 April 1991 Semi-final	Kerry	2-07 - 1-06	Meath	Gaelic Grounds, Limerick

28 April 1991 Semi-final	Tyrone	4-13 - 2-07	Leitrim	Brewster Park, Enniskillen

Final

12 May 1991 Final	Tyrone	4-16 - 1-05	Kerry	St. Conleth's Park, Newbridge

== Statistics ==
=== Miscellaneous ===
- The All-Ireland semi-finals see two first-time pairings as Tyrone and Leitrim, as well as Kerry and Meath meet for the first time in the championship.
