= 1993–94 All-Ireland Senior Club Football Championship =

Irish Football Championship

- Dates: 3 October 1993 – 17 March 1994
- Teams: 33
- Champions: Nemo Rangers (6th title); Steven O'Brien (captain); Dinny Allen (manager)
- Runners-up: Castlebar Mitchels; Tom Reilly (captain); Tommy O'Malley (manager)

Tournament statistics
- Matches played: 36
- Top scorer(s): Colin Corkery (2-26)

The 1993–94 All-Ireland Senior Club Football Championship was the 24th staging of the All-Ireland Senior Club Football Championship since its establishment by the Gaelic Athletic Association in 1970-71. The championship began on 3 October 1993 and ended on 17 March 1994.

O'Donovan Rossa were the defending champions, however, they failed to qualify after being beaten by Nemo Rangers in the quarter-final of the 1993 Cork County Championship.

On 17 March 1994, Nemo Rangers won the championship following a 3-11 to 0-08 defeat of Castlebar Mitchels in the All-Ireland final at Croke Park. It was their sixth championship title overall and their first title since 1989.

Nemo Rangers' Colin Corkery was the championship's top scorer with 2-26.

== Connacht ==
=== Quarter-final ===
3 October 1993 Semi-final	Aughawillan	1-13 - 0-05	Eastern Harps	Páirc Achadh Mhaoileann
	D Darcy 0-6, F Smith 1-2, P Prior 0-2, Pat Flanagan 0-2, D Gilheaney 0-1.		P Taylor 0-2, P Walshe 0-2, J Bruen 0-1.

=== Semi-finals ===
30 October 1993 Semi-final	Castlebar Mitchels	1-10 - 0-08	Aughawillan	MacHale Park
	D Byrne 1-2, R Ruane 0-4, B Kilkelly 0-2, S Murphy 0-1, T Reilly 0-1.		D Darcy 0-4, P Prior 0-3, P Flanagan 0-1.

14 November 1993 Semi-final	Clann na nGael	1-11 - 0-07	Corofin	Dr Hyde Park
	E Durney 0-5, E Gavin 1-0, EJ McManus 0-3, F Shine 0-1, T Naughton 0-1, A McManus 0-1.		G Burke 0-4, M Donnellan 0-2, G Hanley 0-1.

=== Final ===
28 November 1993 Final	Castlebar Mitchels	1-09 - 0-12	Clann na nGael	MacHale Park
	D Byrne 1-2, R Ruane 0-3, K Lydon 0-2, B Kilkenny 0-1, S Murphy 0-1.		E Durney 0-8, T McManus 0-1, F Shine 0-1, S Naughton 0-1, P McManus 0-1.

5 December 1993 Final replay	Clann na nGael	0-09 - 1-07	Castlebar Mitchels	Páirc Naomh Bríd
	E Durney 0-2, B Doyle 0-2, E McManus 0-1, T Naughton 0-1, P McManus 0-1, E Gavin 0-1, S Naughton 0-1.		T Reilly 1-0, R Ruane 0-3, B Kilkelly 0-1, D Byrne 0-1, S Murphy 0-1, D Noone 0-1.

== Leinster ==
=== First round ===
16 October 1993 First round	Clann na Gael	1-08 - 1-09	Mullingar Shamrocks	Clann na Gael Park
	S White 0-6, C O'Hanlon 1-0, G Curran 0-1, D Staunton 0-1.		B Sex 1-1, B Flynn 0-3, D Corroon 0-1, P Ahearne 0-1, P Faulkner 0-1, M O'Reilly 0-1, M Treanor 0-1.

30 October 1993 First round	Éire Óg	2-12 - 2-05	Killoe Young Emmets	Dr Cullen Park
	C Hayden 1-3, A Keating 1-1, G Ware 0-3, J Hayden 0-2, J Morrissey 0-2, W Quinlan 0-1.		J McCormack 1-2, D O'Boyle 1-0, K Dooner 0-1, J Coyle 0-1, M Kiernan 0-1.

30 October 1993 First round	The Heath	1-20 - 0-04	Barrow Rangers	O'Moore Park
	D Lalor 0-9, Pat Booth 1-2, P Lalor 0-3, Paul Booth 0-3, L Doran 0-1, B McNamee 0-1, C Dunne 0-1.		D Maher 0-2, P Hennessy 0-2.

30 October 1993 First round	Baltinglass	0-15 - 0-03	Killanerin	Aughrim County Ground
	R McHugh 0-7, D McMahon 0-4, A Owens 0-2, K O'Brien 0-2.		PJ Gethings 0-2, N Darcy 0-1.

=== Quarter-finals ===
13 November 1993 Quarter-final	Éire Óg	2-13 - 1-02	Clara	Dr Cullen Park
	C Hayden 1-5, J Hayden 1-3, W Quinlan 0-2, G Ware 0-1, B Hayden 0-1, J Morrissey 0-1.		C Kane 1-0, M Scanlon 0-1, J Stewart 0-1.

13 November 1993 Quarter-final	The Heath	0-09 - 1-11	Erin's Isle	O'Moore Park
	S Booth 0-2, D Lalor 0-2, N Roe 0-2, P Roe 0-1, B McNamee 0-1.		M Deegan 1-1, C Redmond 0-3, K O'Hare 0-2, E Sheehan 0-2, J Fagan 0-1, J Barr 0-1, K Barr 0-1.

14 November 1993 Quarter-final	Mullingar Shamrocks	1-11 - 1-07	Skryne	Castletown Sportsfield
	B Flynn 1-3, M O'Reilly 0-3, B Sex 0-2, C Ryan 0-1, T Ormsby 0-1, P Ahearne 0-1.		T Giles 1-4, C Lynch 0-1, D Smith 0-1, M O'Dowd 0-1.

14 November 1993 Quarter-final	Baltinglass	1-08 - 1-08	Sarsfields	Aughrim County Ground
	R McHugh 0-6, K O'Brien 1-1, R Dunne 0-1.		N Timmons 1-0, N Buckley 0-3, K Horgan 0-3, B Nolan 0-1, D Earley 0-1.

20 November 1993 Quarter-final replay	Sarsfields	2-05 - 2-09	Baltinglass	St Conleth's Park
	B Nolan 2-0, N Buckley 0-3, L Maguire 0-1, D Earley 0-1.		K O'Brien 2-2, R McHugh 0-5, A Owens 0-1, J O'Keeffe 0-1.

=== Semi-finals ===
27 November 1993 Semi-final	Erin's Isle	3-07 - 0-13	Baltinglass	St Conleth's Park
	E Sheehan 2-0, C Redmond 1-3, J Barr 0-2, M Deegan 0-1, K Barr 0-1.		K O'Brien 0-7, R McHugh 0-3, A Owens 0-2, D McMahon 0-1.

28 November 1993 Semi-final	Éire Óg	3-13 - 1-02	Mullingar Shamrocks	O'Moore Park
	J Hayden 1-3, A Keating 1-2, J Murphy 1-1, C Hayden 0-4, T Nolan 0-2, B Hayden 0-1.		M O'Reilly 1-0, B Sex 0-1, E Casey 0-1.

=== Final ===
12 December 1993 Final	Éire Óg	3-07 - 0-11	Erin's Isle	St Conleth's Park
	A Keating 3-1, C Hayden 0-4, Q Quinlan 0-2.		J Barr 0-3, C Redmond 0-3, C O'Hare 0-3, T Russell 0-1, K Barr 0-1.

== Munster ==
=== First round ===
17 October 1993 First round	Laune Rangers	0-13 - 1-06	Claughaun	J. P. O'Sullivan Park
	T Fleming 0-5, B O'Sullivan 0-4, T Corkery 0-2, P Griffin 0-1, B O'Shea 0-1.		L O'Connor 1-2, P Galligan 0-2, B Tynan 0-1, F Glynn 0-1.

31 October 1993 First round	Kilmurry Ibrickane	1-08 - 0-09	Fethard	Páirc Naomh Mhuire
	P Hickey 0-4, O O'Dwyer 1-0, Danny Coughlan 0-2, D Daly 0-1, D Coughlan 0-1.		M Coen 0-6, T Sheehan 0-2, C Coen 0-1.

=== Semi-finals ===
14 November 1993 Semi-final	Kilmurry Ibrickane	0-13 - 1-02	Dungarvan	Páirc Naomh Mhuire
	P Hickey 0-8, O O'Dwyer 0-3, D Coughlan 0-2.		P Power 1-0, M Ferncombe 0-1, F Cunningham 0-1.

5 December 1993 Semi-final	Laune Rangers	0-07 - 0-13	Nemo Rangers	J. P. O'Sullivan Park
	T Fleming 0-4, P Griffin 0-2, B O'Shea 0-1.		C Corkery 0-7, P Lambert 0-2, E Fitzgerald 0-2, S Calnan 0-1, J Kavanagh 0-1.

=== Final ===
12 December 1993 Final	Nemo Rangers	1-17 - 0-04	Kilmurry Ibrickane	FitzGerald Stadium
	C Corkery 1-9, J Kavanagh 0-3, P Lambert 0-2, T Nation 0-1, S Calnan 0-1, S Fahy 0-1.		P Hickey 0-1, P Montgomery 0-1, D Coughlan 0-1, O O'Dwyer 0-1.

== Ulster ==
=== Preliminary round ===
3 October 1993 Preliminary round	Lavey	3-15 - 1-06	Kingscourt Stars	Dean McGlinchey Park
	S Downey 1-3, J McGuirk 1-1, B McCormick 0-4, HM McCormick 1-0, F Rafferty 0-3, O Collins 0-2, D Mulholland 0-1, M Collins 0-1.		A Gargan 1-0, J McCarthy 0-3, T McKeown 0-2, P McCormack 0-1.

=== Quarter-finals ===
3 October 1993 Quarter-final	Clan na Gael	3-10 - 0-10	Scotstown	The Playing Fields
	B McAreavey 1-2, J Campbell 1-1, P O'Hagan 1-0, P Henderson 0-3, D Marsden 0-2, J French 0-2.		R McCarron 0-6, J McCarville 0-4.

3 October 1993 Quarter-final	Devenish	1-07 - 0-14	Kilcar	Brewster Park
	M Gallagher 1-4, P Coyle 0-2, C Gallagher 0-1.		J McHugh 0-4, M McHugh 0-3, M McShane 0-2, P Howley 0-2, M Molloy 0-1, C Gillespie 0-1, Roger McShane 0-1.

3 October 1993 Quarter-final	Russell Gaelic Union, Downpatrick	1-11 - 0-05	St Gall's	St Patrick's Park
	M Bohill 0-4, R Scullion 0-4, P Evans 1-0, C Deegan 0-1, Gregaory Deegan 0-1, G Breen 0-1.		B Drake 0-5.

31 October 1993 Quarter-final	Errigal Ciarán	1-10 - 1-07	Lavey	Healy Park
	E McCaffrey 1-3, Peter Canavan 0-2, Pascal Canavan 0-2, E Gormley 0-1, M McCaffrey 0-1< E Kavanagh 0-1.		S Downey 1-0, F Rafferty 0-2, B McCormick 0-2, O Collins 0-2, Colm McGuirk 0-1.

=== Semi-finals ===
31 October 1993 Semi-final	Russell Gaelic Union, Downpatrick	3-09 - 1-10	Clan na Gael	Casement Park
	K Smith 1-2, R Scullion 1-1, G Breen 1-1, G Deegan 0-2, G Deegan 0-1, C Deegan 0-1, M Quinn 0-1.		J Campbell 1-0, J French 0-2, B O'Hagan 0-2, K O'Hagan 0-1, D Marsden 0-1, P O'Hagan 0-1, B McAreavey 0-1, P Henderson 0-1.

14 November 1993 Semi-final	Errigal Ciarán	2-06 - 2-06	Kilcar	St Molaise Park
	E Gormley 1-1, Peter Canavan 0-4, M Farrell 1-0, H Quinn 0-1.		M McShane 1-1, J Carr 1-0, R McShane 0-2, P Howley 0-2, M McHugh 0-1.

28 November 1993 Semi-final replay	Errigal Ciarán	0-05 - 0-03	Kilcar	St Molaise Park
	Peter Canavan 0-4, E McCaffrey 0-1.		R McShane 0-2, P Howley 0-1.

=== Final ===
5 December 1993 Final	Errigal Ciarán	3-07 - 1-08	Russell Gaelic Union, Downpatrick	Athletic Grounds
	Peter Canavan 1-4, P McCaffrey 1-1, S Canavan 1-1, R McAleer 0-1.		K Smyth 0-8, G Breen 1-0.

== Quarter-final ==
12 December 1993 Quarter-final	Tír Chonaill Gaels	0-08 - 0-11	Castlebar Mitchels	Emerald GAA Grounds
	B Brennan 0-2, C McGarvey 0-1, L Molloy 0-1, S Faulkner 0-1, T Gallagher 0-1, E Bonner 0-1, R Henneberry 0-1.		S Murphy 0-2, T Reilly 0-2, R Ruane 0-2, D Byrne 0-2, B Kilkelly 0-2, P Holmes 0-1.

== Semi-finals ==
27 February 1994 Semi-final	Castlebar Micthels	1-09 - 1-09 (aet)	Éire Óg	Pearse Park
	F Joyce 1-0, T Reilly 0-3, S Murphy 0-3, D Shaw 0-1, B Kilkelly 0-1, D Byrne 0-1.		J Morrissey 1-1, J Hayden 0-4, C Hayden 0-2, G Ware 0-1, A Keating 0-1.

5 March 1994 Semi-final replay	Castlebar Micthels	0-08 - 0-07	Éire Óg	Pearse Park
	T Reilly 0-2, B Kilkenny 0-2, K Lydon 0-2, S Murphy 0-1, R Ruane 0-1.		C Hayden 0-4, W Quinlan 0-1, A Keating 0-1, J Hayden 0-1.

5 March 1994 Semi-final	Nemo Ranegers	1-13 - 0-11 (aet)	Errigal Ciarán	St Conleth's Park
	C Corkery 1-7, J Kavanagh 0-2, E Fitzgerald 0-2, T Dalton 0-1, L Kavanagh 0-1.		P Canavan 0-6, E Gormley 0-2, E Kavanagh 0-1, E McCaffrey 0-1, M McCaffrey 0-1.

== Final ==
17 March 1994 Final	Nemo Rangers	3-11 - 0-08	Castlebar Mitchels	Croke Park
	J Kavanagh 2-2, S Calnan 1-3, C Corkery 0-3, P Lambert 0-2, S O'Brien 0-1.		S Murphy 0-3, T Reilly 0-2, R Ruane 0-1, D Byrne 0-1, K Lydon 0-1.

== Statistics ==
=== Top scorers ===
Overall

Rank	Player	Club	Tally	Total	Matches	Average
1	Colin Corkery	Nemo Rangers	2-26	32	4	8.00
2	Colm Hayden	Éire Óg	2-22	28	6	4.66
3	Peter Canavan	Errigal Ciarán	1-20	23	5	4.60
4	Anthony Keating	Éire Óg	5-06	23	5	4.60
4	Kevin O'Brien	Baltinglass	3-12	21	4	5.25
4	Robert McHugh	Baltinglass	0-21	21	4	5.25
5	Joe Hayden	Éire Óg	2-13	19	6	3.16
6	Diarmuid Byrne	Castlebar Mitchels	2-09	15	7	2.14
6	Emmet Durney	Clann na nGael	0-15	15	3	5.00
7	Joe Kavanagh	Nemo Rangers	2-08	14	4	3.50
7	Ronan Ruane	Castlebar Mitchels	0-14	14	7	2.00

In a single game

Rank	Player	Club	Tally	Total	Opposition
1	Colin Corkery	Nemo Rangers	1-09	12	Kilmurry Ibrickane
2	Anthony Keating	Éire Óg	3-01	10	Erin's Isle
2	Colin Corkery	Nemo Rangers	1-07	10	Errigal Ciarán
3	Denis Lalor	The Heath	0-09	9	Barrow Rangers
4	Kevin O'Brien	Baltinglass	2-02	8	Sarsfields
4	Joe Kavanagh	Nemo Rangers	2-02	8	Castlebar Mitchels
4	Colm Hayden	Éire Óg	1-05	8	Clara
4	Emmet Durney	Clann na nGael	0-08	8	Castlebar Mitchels
4	Paul Hickey	Kilmurry Ibrickane	0-08	8	Dungarvan
4	Kyran Smyth	Russell Gaelic Union, Downpatrick	0-08	8	Errigal Ciarán

=== Miscellaneous ===
- Errigal Ciarán won the Ulster Club Championship for the first time in their history. They were also the first team from Tyrone to win the provincial title.
