= Diarmuid Duggan =

Irish Gaelic footballer

Personal information
- Native name: Diarmuid Ó Duagáin (Irish)
- Nickname: Duggie
- Born: 1980 (age 45–46) Lisheen, County Cork, Ireland
- Occupation: Primary school principal
- Height: 6 ft 0 in (183 cm)

Sport
- Sport: Gaelic football
- Position: Right corner-back
Clubs
- Years: Club
- Ilen Rovers → Carbery
Club titles
- Cork titles: 0
College
- Years: College
- Mary Immaculate College
College titles
- Sigerson titles: 0
Inter-county*
| Years | County | Apps (scores) |
| 2005-2008 | Cork | 6 (0-00) |
Inter-county titles
- Munster titles: 2
- All-Irelands: 0
- NFL: 0
- All Stars: 0
- *Inter County team apps and scores correct as of 13:04, 18 April 2020.

Diarmuid Duggan (born 1980) is an Irish former Gaelic football player and manager who played for club side Ilen Rovers, at the divisional level with Carbery and inter-county level with the Cork senior football team. He usually lined out at right corner-back.

== Career ==
Duggan first came to Gaelic football prominence with the Ilen Rovers club in West Cork, with whom he won an All-Ireland Club Championship medal in the intermediate grade in 2004. He had earlier won county junior and intermediate medals. Duggan first played for Cork at minor and under-21 levels, while he won an All-Ireland Junior Championship title in 2001. He subsequently progressed onto the Cork senior team and won two Munster Championship medals and was a substitute when Cork wwasbeaten by Kerry in the 2007 All-Ireland final. As a player with Munster, Duggan won a Railway Cup medal in 2008. A series of injuries brought an end to his playing career, and he turned to coaching and team management with his home club.

== Honours ==
Ilen Rovers

- All-Ireland Intermediate Club Football Championship: 2004
- Munster Intermediate Club Football Championship: 2003
- Cork Intermediate Football Championship: 2003
- Cork Junior A Football Championship: 2001
- South West Junior A Football Championship: 1999, 2000, 2001

Cork

- Munster Senior Football Championship: 2006, 2008
- All-Ireland Junior Football Championship: 2001
- Munster Junior Football Championship: 2001
- Munster Under-21 Football Championship: 2001

Munster

- Railway Cup: 2008
