= Seamus Downey =

Derry Gaelic footballer

Seamus Downey is a former Gaelic footballer who played for the Lavey club and the Derry county team in the 1980s, 1990s and 2000. He retired from inter-county football in 2000.

Downey was part of Derry's 1993 All-Ireland Championship winning side where he scored a goal in the final against Cork. His brother Henry captained the winning Derry team in the final.

== Honours ==
Club:

1 All-Ireland club championship 1991

=== County ===
- 3 Ulster Senior Football Championship 1987 1993 1998
- 3 National Football League Division 1 1992 1995 1996
- 1 All-Ireland Senior Football Championship 1993
