= 1993 All-Ireland Under-21 Football Championship =

Gaelic football competition

Championship details

All-Ireland Champions
- Winning team: Meath (1st win)
- Captain: Thomas Hanley

All-Ireland Finalists
- Losing team: Kerry

Provincial Champions
- Munster: Kerry
- Leinster: Meath
- Ulster: Derry
- Connacht: Galway

The 1993 All-Ireland Under-21 Football Championship was the 30th staging of the All-Ireland Under-21 Football Championship since its establishment by the Gaelic Athletic Association in 1964.

Tyrone entered the championship as defending champions, however, they were defeated in the Ulster Championship

On 29 September 1993, Meath won the championship following a 1-8 to 0-10 defeat of Kerry in the All-Ireland final match. This was their first All-Ireland title.

== Results ==
=== All-Ireland Under-21 Football Championship ===
Semi-finals

1 August 1993 Semi-final	Kerry	1-13 - 0-12	Galway	Cusack Park, Ennis

1 August 1993 Semi-final	Meath	0-13 - 1-10	Derry	St. Mary's Park, Castleblayney

8 August 1993 Semi-final replay	Meath	0-11 - 1-06	Derry	St. Mary's Park, Castleblayney

Final

29 September 1993 Final	Meath	1-08 - 0-10	Kerry	O'Moore Park, Portlaoise

== Statistics ==
=== Miscellaneous ===
- The All-Ireland semi-final between Meath and Derry is the first championship meeting between the two teams.
