= Nigel Nestor =

Irish Gaelic footballer

Personal information
- Native name: Niall Mac Adhaistair (Irish)
- Born: 1974 (age 51–52) Dunboyne, County Meath
- Height: 6 ft 3 in (191 cm)

Sport
- Sport: Gaelic football
- Position: Centre Back
Club
- Years: Club
- 1995–2005: Blackhall Gaels
Club titles
- Meath titles: 1
Inter-county
Years	County	Apps (scores)
1997–2004	Meath	26 (00–09)
Inter-county titles
- Leinster titles: 2
- All-Irelands: 1
- NFL: 0
- All Stars: 0

Nigel Nestor is an Irish former sportsperson. He played Gaelic football with his local club Blackhall Gaels and was a member of the Meath county team which won the 1999 All-Ireland Senior Football Championship Final, beating Cork, He was also part of the Meath team that reached the 2001 All-Ireland Senior Football Championship Final, losing to Galway. He was also part of the Meath team that lost the NFL in 2000, losing to Derry team.
