= Joe Kavanagh =

Irish Gaelic footballer

Personal information
- Native name: Seosamh Caomhánach (Irish)
- Born: 27 February 1973 (age 53) Turners Cross, Cork, Ireland
- Occupation: Electrician
- Height: 5 ft 11 in (180 cm)

Sport
- Sport: Gaelic Football
- Position: Centre-forward
Club
Years	Club	Apps (scores)
1990-2010	Nemo Rangers	78 (19-130)
Club titles
- Cork titles: 5
- Munster titles: 5
- All-Ireland Titles: 2
College
- Years: College
- Cork RTC
College titles
- Sigerson titles: 0
Inter-county
Years	County	Apps (scores)
1992-2002	Cork	36 (7-61)
Inter-county titles
- Munster titles: 5
- All-Irelands: 0
- NFL: 1
- All Stars: 1

Joe Kavanagh (born 27 February 1973) is an Irish Gaelic football coach and former player. At club level he played with Nemo Rangers and was also a member of the Cork senior football team.

== Early life ==
Born and raised in Turners Cross, Kavanagh first played Gaelic football as a schoolboy with Coláiste Chríost Rí. He was just 16-years-old when he won a Corn Uí Mhuirí medal after a one-point final defeat of St Brendan's College in 1989. Kavanagh also lined out for Chríost Rí in the subsequent All-Ireland colleges final replay defeat by St Patrick's College. He later played on Cork Regional Technical College's inaugural Sigerson Cup team.

== Club career ==
Kavanagh began his club career playing in the street leagues at juvenile level with the Nemo Rangers club on the southside of Cork city. He enjoyed a hugely successful underage career and won three successive Cork MAFC titles between 1989 and 1991. Kavanagh's final year in the minor grade also saw him won a Cork U21AFC medal after a defeat of Beara in the final.

By that stage Kavanagh had already joined the club's senior team, having made his debut in a quarter-final replay defeat of Imokilly in 1990. He claimed his first silverware three years later, when Nemo claimed the Cork SFC title after a 0–13 to 0–04 defeat of St Finbarr's in the 1993 final. Kavanagh later collected a Munster Club SFC medal before scoring 2–02 in Nemo's defeat of Castlebar Mitchels in the 1994 All-Ireland club final.

Kavanagh was a key member of the Nemo Rangers team that won three successive Cork SFC medals from 2000 to 2002. These were subsequently converted into three successive Munster Club SFC titles, however, Nemo lost back-to-back All-Ireland club finals in 2001 and 2002. Kavanagh claimed a second All-Ireland club winners' medal after Nemo's 0–14 to 1–09 defeat of Crossmolina Deel Rovers in the 2003 All-Ireland club final.

Kavanagh won a fifth and final Cork SFC medal after a defeat of Muskerry in 2005. After later winning a fifth provincial medal, he made his final senior appearance in the 2006 All-Ireland club semi-final defeat by St Gall's. Kavanagh continued to line out with Nemo Rangers in the lower grade Cork PIFC, before bringing his 20-year club career to an end with Nemo's junior team in 2010.

== Inter-county career ==
Kavanagh began a two-year association with the Cork minor team in 1990. He won a Munster MFC after a defeat of Kerry in his second and final season with the team. Kavanagh later scored two points in Cork's 1991 All-Ireland minor final defeat of Mayo. He was still in his last year with the minor team when he began his four-year tenure as a member of Cork's under-21 team. Kavanagh won a Munster U21FC medal in his final year in the grade, before claiming an All-Ireland U21FC medal after a 1–12 to 1–05 defeat of Mayo in the 1994 All-Ireland under-21 final.

Kavanagh was just out of the minor grade when he joined the senior team for the 1991–92 league. He made his championship debut in the 1992 Munster semi-final defeat by Kerry. Kavanagh won his first Munster SFC in 1993 after beating Tipperary in the final. He later scored 1–01 in the 1993 All-Ireland final defeat by Derry, but ended the year with an All-Star. Kavanagh won further Munster SFC medals in 1994 and 1995 as Cork completed their second-ever three-in-a-row.

A period of Kerry dominance followed, however, Kavanagh claimed his first national silverware with Cork after a defeat of Dublin in the 1999 league final. A fourth Munster SFC followed later that season, however, he was again at centre-forward when Cork suffered a 1–11 to 1–08 defeat by Meath in the 1999 All-Ireland final.

Kavanagh served as team captain in 2001. He collected a fifth Munster SFC winners' medal after a defeat of Tipperary in the 2002 Munster final replay. Kavanagh's last game for Cork was a subsequent All-Ireland semi-final defeat by Kerry.

== Inter-provincial career ==
Kavanagh's performances at inter-county level resulted in a call-up to the Munster inter-provincial team. He spent four years with the team over a five-year period, culminating with the winning of a Railway Cup medal in 1999.

== Coaching career ==
Kavanagh has been involved in coaching at all levels with Nemo Rangers. He was a selector when the club's senior team beat st Finbarr's to win the Cork SFC title in 2017, before later claiming the Munster Club SFC title. Nemo Rangers ended the season by being beaten by Corofin in the 2018 All-Ireland club final.

== Honours ==
=== Player ===
Coláiste Chríost Rí

- Corn Uí Mhuirí: 1989

Nemo Rangers

- All-Ireland Senior Club Hurling Championship: 1994, 2003
- Munster Senior Club Hurling Championship: 1993, 2000, 2001, 2002, 2005
- Cork Senior Football Championship: 1993, 2000, 2001, 2002, 2005
- Cork Under-21 Football Championship: 1991
- Cork Minor Football Championship: 1989, 1990, 1991

Cork

- Munster Senior Football Championship: 1993, 1994, 1995, 1999, 2002
- National Football League: 1998–99
- All-Ireland Under-21 Football Championship: 1994
- Munster Under-21 Football Championship: 1994
- All-Ireland Minor Football Championship: 1991
- Munster Minor Football Championship: 1991

Munster

- Railway Cup: 1999

=== Management ===
Nemo Rangers

- Munster Senior Club Football Championship: 2017
- Cork Senior Football Championship: 2017

Sporting positions
Preceded by Philip Clifford	Cork senior football team captain 2001	Succeeded by Colin Corkery
