= 1962 Cork Junior Football Championship =

- Dates: 23 September – 3 December 1962
- Teams: 8
- Champions: Douglas (1st title)
- Runners-up: Midleton

Tournament statistics
- Matches played: 7
- Goals scored: 16 (2.29 per match)
- Points scored: 85 (12.14 per match)

The 1962 Cork Junior Football Championship was the 64th staging of the Cork Junior A Football Championship since its establishment by Cork County Board in 1895. The championship ran from 23 September to 3 December 1962.

The final was played on 3 December 1962 at Riverstown Sportsfield in Cork, between Douglas and Midleton, in what was their first ever meeting in the final. Douglas won the match by 2–10 to 1–03 to claim their first ever championship title.

== Qualification ==
Division	Championship	Representatives
Avondhu	North Cork Junior A Football Championship	Glanworth
Beara	Beara Junior A Football Championship	Adrigole
Carbery	South West Junior A Football Championship	Dohenys
Carrigdhoun	South East Junior A Football Championship	Crosshaven
Duhallow	Duhallow Junior A Football Championship	Kanturk
Imokilly	East Cork Junior A Football Championship	Midleton
Muskerry	Mid Cork Junior A Football Championship	Canovee
Seandún	City Junior A Football Championship	Douglas

== Results ==
=== Quarter-finals ===
23 September 1962 Quarter-final	Kanturk	1–07 – 0–08	Dohenys	Ballingeary Grounds

7 October 1962 Quarter-final	Douglas	1–11 – 1–03	Adrigole	Sam Maguire Park

7 October 1962 Quarter-final	Midleton	3–07 – 3–03	Glanworth	Pirc Mac Gearailt

4 November 1962 Quarter-final	Canovee	2–05 – 0–08	Crosshaven	Cork Athletic Grounds

=== Semi-finals ===
21 October 1962 Semi-final	Midleton	1–07 – 0–03	Kanturk	Castletownroche Grounds

18 November 1962 Semi-final	Douglas	0–09 – 1–01	Canovee	Cork Athletic Grounds

=== Final ===
3 December 1962 Final	Douglas	2–10 – 1–03	Midleton	Riverstown Sportsfield
