= Michael Collins (referee) =

Gaelic football referee

Personal information
- Native name: Mícheál Ó Coileáin
- Home town: Clonakilty
- Occupation: SuperValu employee
- Years active: 1985–2013
- Employer: GAA

Sport
- Sport: Gaelic football
- Position: Referee

Michael Collins is a Gaelic football referee from County Cork. He is from Clonakilty.

Collins first took up refereeing in 1985 when he officiated a West Cork Junior B Football League game in Barryroe. After four years, he was part of the Cork GAA referees' panel.

He made his inter-county debut in 1994, overseeing a Munster MFC game between Waterford and Tipperary. His first involvement at senior inter-county level saw him referee Limerick against Tipperary in the 1998 Munster SFC. He later officiated the 2001 Ulster SFC final, an All-Ireland SFC quarter-final and the 2001 All-Ireland Senior Football Championship Final between Galway and Meath. He also received a Celtic Ross Sports Star of the Year Award in 2001.

Collins's inter-county refereeing career concluded in 2013, after he officiated the Division 2 game between Longford and Laois. His last championship involvement was a Leinster SFC first round game between Wexford and Longford. He was replaced by David Gough, who would become an All-Ireland SFC final recipient himself, though there was space on the panel after Pádraig Hughes injured himself against Eamonn Doherty when he was officiating the Dublin game in Ballybofey.

Collins is married and has a son. As of 2018, he was working in SuperValu in Clonakilty.
