= 1997 Cork Intermediate Football Championship =

Gaelic football competition

- Champions: Douglas (1st title); Donal O'Callaghan (captain)
- Runners-up: Castletownbere; Séamus Harrington (captain)

The 1997 Cork Intermediate Football Championship was the 62nd staging of the Cork Intermediate Football Championship since its establishment by the Cork County Board in 1909. The draw for the opening round fixtures took place on 8 December 1996.

The final replay was played on 30 November 1997 at Rossa Park in Skibbereen, between Douglas and Castletownbere, in what was their first ever meeting in a final. Douglas won the match by 0-09 to 1-03 to claim their first ever championship title.

== Results ==
=== Final ===
8 September 1997 Final	Douglas	0-09 - 1-06	Castletownbere	Rossa Park
	R McCarthy 0-4, E Coveney 0-1, D O'Callaghan 0-1, B Finn 0-1, J Farrell 0-1, T Twomey 0-1.		A O'Regan 1-2, S Spencer 0-3, D Healy 0-1.	Referee: J Cummins (Glanworth)

30 November 1997 Final replay	Douglas	0-09 - 1-03	Castletownbere	Rossa Park
	R Geary 0-5, R McCarthy 0-1, E Coveney 0-1, J Farrell 0-1, D O'Callaghan 0-1.		S O'Regan 1-0, M O'Sullivan 0-1, A O'Regan 0-1, D Wiseman 0-1.	Referee: J Cummins (Glanworth)
