= Tomás Mannion =

Galway Gaelic footballer

Personal information
- Native name: Tomás Ó Mainnín (Irish)
- Born: 1 October 1969 (age 57)
- Occupation: Farmer
- Height: 5 ft 10 in (178 cm)

Sport
- Sport: Gaelic football
- Position: Left corner back
Clubs
- Years: Club
- Monivea Abbey (F); Abbeyknockmoy (H)
Club titles
	Football	Hurling
Galway titles	1	1
Inter-county
- Years: County
- 1989–2002: Galway
Inter-county titles
- Connacht titles: 3
- All-Irelands: 2
- NFL: 0
- All Stars: 1

Tomás Mannion (born 1 October 1969) is an Irish former Gaelic footballer who played for the Galway county team.

== Playing career ==
Mannion first represented Galway at minor level. Mannion was at corner forward in the final of the 1986 All-Ireland Minor Football Championship, scoring two goals in the win over Cork.

Mannion was a corner back on the Galway team that won the All-Ireland in 1998, beating Kildare. Mannion was named on the All Star team later that year. After retiring due to a back injury, missing the 2000 championship, Mannion returned to the Galway team for the 2001 season. Later that year, Mannion was at centre back for the All-Ireland final against Meath. Galway were nine-point winners, giving Mannion his second All-Ireland medal. Mannion retired from inter-county football after the 2002 season.

== Honours ==
Galway

- All-Ireland Senior Football Championship (2): 1998, 2001
- Connacht Senior Football Championship (3): 1995, 1998, 2002
- All-Ireland Minor Football Championship (1): 1986
- Connacht Minor Football Championship (1): 1986

Monivea Abbey

- Galway Senior Football Championship (1): 1992

Abbeyknockmoy

- Galway Senior Hurling Championship (1): 1988

Individual

- All Star Award (1): 1998
