= 1992 All-Ireland Under-21 Football Championship =

Gaelic football competition

Championship details

All-Ireland Champions
- Winning team: Tyrone (2nd win)
- Captain: Peter Canavan

All-Ireland Finalists
- Losing team: Galway

Provincial Champions
- Munster: Kerry
- Leinster: Kildare
- Ulster: Tyrone
- Connacht: Galway

The 1992 All-Ireland Under-21 Football Championship was the 29th staging of the All-Ireland Under-21 Football Championship since its establishment by the Gaelic Athletic Association in 1964.

Tyrone entered the championship as defending champions.

On 30 August 1992, Tyrone won the championship following a 1-10 to 1-7 defeat of Galway in the All-Ireland final. This was their second All-Ireland title overall and their second title in successive seasons.

== Results ==
=== All-Ireland Under-21 Football Championship ===
Semi-finals

8 August 1992 Semi-final	Tyrone	1-13 - 1-08	Kerry	Parnell Park, Dublin

8 August 1992 Semi-final	Galway	0-11 - 0-07	Kildare	O'Connor Park, Tullamore

Final

30 August 1992 Final	Tyrone	1-10 - 1-07	Galway	Pearse Park, Longford

== Statistics ==
=== Miscellaneous ===
- Peter Canavan of Tyrone becomes the first player to captain a team to successive All-Ireland titles.
