= Eoin Cotter =

Irish sportsperson

Personal information
- Native name: Eoin Mac Oitir (Irish)
- Born: 29 July 1987 (age 39) Douglas, Cork, Ireland
- Height: 6 ft 0 in (183 cm)

Sport
- Sport: Gaelic football
- Position: Left corner-back
Club
- Years: Club
- 2005–present: Douglas
Inter-county*
Years	County	Apps (scores)
2010–	Cork	4
Inter-county titles
- Munster titles: 1
- All-Irelands: 1
- NFL: 3
- All Stars: 0
- *Inter County team apps and scores correct as of 23:25, 26 May 2011.

Eoin Cotter (born 29 July 1987 in Douglas, Cork, Ireland) is an Irish sportsperson. He plays Gaelic football with his local club Douglas, and was a member of the Cork senior inter-county team from 2010.

Before joining the senior team he also played underage with Cork. He was captain of the team that won the 2005 Munster Minor Football Championship. He also played Under 21, and was part of the panel that won the 2007 Munster and All-Ireland Under-21 Football Championships.

At club level he helped Douglas to a first Cork Senior Football Championship final in 2008. However their opponents, Nemo Rangers, were successful in the final. He has also won Boston County and North American Championship medals.
