= 2001 Cork Junior A Football Championship =

- Dates: 29 September – 2 December 2001
- Teams: 8
- Champions: Ilen Rovers (1st title); Brian O'Sullivan (captain)
- Runners-up: Kinsale

Tournament statistics
- Matches played: 8
- Goals scored: 17 (2.13 per match)
- Points scored: 188 (23.5 per match)
- Top scorer(s): Ger Murphy (3–26)

The 2001 Cork Junior A Football Championship was the 103rd staging of the Cork Junior A Football Championship since its establishment by Cork County Board in 1895. The championship ran from 29 September to 2 December 2001.

The final was played on 2 December 2001 at Charlie Hurley Park in Bandon, between Ilen Rovers and Kinsale, in what was their first ever meeting in the final. Ilen Rovers won the match by 0–14 to 1–04 to claim their first ever championship title.

Kinsale's Ger Murphy was the championship's top scorer with 3–26.

== Qualification ==
Division	Championship	Champions
Avondhu	North Cork Junior A Football Championship	Mitchelstown
Beara	Beara Junior A Football Championship	Adrigole
Carbery	South West Junior A Football Championship	Ilen Rovers
Carrigdhoun	South East Junior A Football Championship	Kinsale
Duhallow	Duhallow Junior A Football Championship	Rockchapel
Imokilly	East Cork Junior A Football Championship	Cloyne
Muskerry	Mid Cork Junior A Football Championship	Grenagh
Seandún	City Junior A Football Championship	Mayfield

== Results ==
=== Quarter-finals ===
29 September 2001 Quarter-final	Adrigole	1–11 – 0–07	Mayfield	Páirc Tadhg na Samhna
	JL O'Sullivan 1-1, EJ O'Sullivan 0-4, BJ O'Sullivan 0-2, T O'Shea 0-1, M Harrington 0-1, P O'Sullivan 0-1, H Buckley 0-1.		B Hegarty 0-5, T Lotty 0-1, J Wall 0-1.

28 October 2001 Quarter-final	Cloyne	2–12 – 1–11	Rockchapel	Dr Croke Park
	D Motherway 1-5, D O'Sullivan 1-4, C O'Sullivan 0-2, K O'Lomasney 0-1.		JF Murphy 1-2, M Casey 0-5, M Leahy 0-3, A O'Donnell 0-1.

3 November 2001 Quarter-final	Kinsale	1–09 – 0–12	Mitchelstown	Riverstown Sportsfield
	G Murphy 0-6, F O'Hanlon 1-1, G Farrissey 0-2.		K Cotter 0-3, C Griffin 0-2, J O'Brien 0-2, P Donegan 0-1, S Maher 0-1, A O'Brien 0-1, A McNamara 0-1, P Griffin 0-1.

4 November 2001 Quarter-final	Ilen Rovers	2–11 – 2–09	Grenagh	Kilmichael Grounds
	B O'Sullivan 1-3, P Connolly 0-5, K O'Sullivan 1-1, E Sheehy 0-1, J Whooley 0-1.		A Dorgan 1-2, DJ O'Mahony 1-0, J Russell 0-3, M Kenny 0-2, D Duggan 0-1, S Coleman 0-1.

11 November 2001 Quarter-final replay	Kinsale	2–17 – 1–18 (aet)	Mitchelstown	Riverstown Sportsfield
	G Murphy 1-11, C O'Brien 1-1, N O'Sullivan 0-2, F O'Hanlon 0-1, K O'Regan 0-1, G Condon 0-1.		J O'Brien 1-5, D Moher 0-4, S Maher 0-2, K Cotter 0-2, A O'Brien 0-2, A McNamara 0-2, K Duggan 0-1.

=== Semi-finals ===
11 November 2001 Semi-final	Ilen Rovers	1–17 – 0–04	Cloyne	Éire Óg Grounds
	P Connolly 0-6, C Collins 1-0, B O'Sullivan 0-3, E Sheehy 0-2, K Daly 0-2, K O'Sullivan 0-2, F O'Donovan 0-1, F Collin 0-1.		C O'Sullivan 0-2, D Motherway 0-1, K Lomasney 0-1.

18 November 2001 Semi-final	Kinsale	3–09 – 0–13	Adrigole	Páirc Tadhg na Samhna
	J Murphy 1-7, N O'Sullivan 1-1, K O'Regan 1-0, W Cummins 0-1.		BJ O'Sullivan 0-4, JL O'Sullivan 0-4, K O'Neill 0-3, T O'Shea 0-1, M Harrington 0-1.

=== Final ===
2 December 2001 Final	Ilen Rovers	0–14 – 1–04	Kinsale	Charlie Hurley Park
	P Connolly 0-4, K O'Sullivan 0-4, B O'Sullivan 0-3, F Collins 0-2, E Sheehy 0-1.		G Murphy 1-2, K O'Regan 0-1, C O'Brien 0-1.

== Championship statistics ==
=== Top scorers ===
Rank	Player	Club	Tally	Total	Matches	Average
1	Ger Murphy	Kinsale	3-26	35	4	8.75
2	Pat Connolly	Ilen Rovers	0-15	15	3	5.00
3	Brian O'Sullivan	Ilen Rovers	1-09	12	3	4.00
4	Joe O'Brien	Mitchelstown	1-07	10	2	5.00
4	Kevin O'Sullivan	Ilen Rovers	1-07	10	3	3.33
6	Declan Motherway	Cloyne	1-06	9	2	4.50
7	John Lack O'Sullivan	Adrigole	1-05	8	2	4.00
8	Diarmuid O'Sullivan	Cloyne	1-04	7	2	3.50
9	Noel O'Sullivan	Adrigole	1-03	6	4	1.50
9	Brendan Jer O'Sullivan	Adrigole	0-06	6	4	1.50
