= Mark O'Reilly =

Irish footballer (born 1976)

Personal information
- Native name: Marc Ó Raghaillaigh (Irish)
- Born: 1976 (age 49–50)
- Height: 5 ft 9 in (175 cm)

Sport
- Sport: Gaelic football
- Position: Right corner back
Club
- Years: Club
- Summerhill
Inter-county
- Years: County
- 1995–2006: Meath
Inter-county titles
- Leinster titles: 3
- All-Irelands: 2
- All Stars: 1

Mark O'Reilly (born 1976) is an Irish former Gaelic footballer who played for Summerhill and the Meath county team.

== Playing career ==
O'Reilly was corner back on the Meath team that won the All-Ireland in 1996, beating Mayo after a replay. O'Reilly was named man of the match in the 1999 All-Ireland Senior Football Championship Final win over Cork, his second All-Ireland medal. O'Reilly was named on the All Star team the same year.

== Honours ==
Meath

- All-Ireland Senior Football Championship (2): 1996, 1999
- Leinster Senior Football Championship (3): 1996, 1999, 2001
- Leinster Under-21 Football Championship (2): 1996, 1997
- Leinster Minor Football Championship (1): 1993

Individual

- All Star Award (1): 1999
- All-Ireland Senior Football Championship Final Man of the Match (1): 1999

Awards
Preceded by Michael Donnellan (Galway)	All-Ireland Senior Football Final; Man of the Match; 1999	Succeeded by Mike Frank Russell (Kerry)
