= Brian Murphy (Clonakilty Gaelic footballer) =

Irish Gaelic footballer

Personal information
- Native name: Brian Ó Murchú (Irish)
- Born: 1973 (age 52–53) Clonakilty, County Cork, Ireland
- Height: 6 ft 0 in (183 cm)

Sport
- Sport: Gaelic football
- Position: Right corner-back
Club
- Years: Club
- Clonakilty
Club titles
- Cork titles: 1
Inter-county*
Years	County	Apps (scores)
1993-1997	Cork	4 (0-00)
Inter-county titles
- Munster titles: 3
- All-Irelands: 0
- NHL: 0
- All Stars: 0
- *Inter County team apps and scores correct as of 11:53, 28 June 2017.

Brian Murphy (born 1973) is an Irish retired Gaelic footballer. His league and championship career with the Cork senior team lasted from 1993 until 1997.

Born in Clonakilty, County Cork, Murphy first played for the Clonakilty club at juvenile and underage levels. In 1996 he was club captain when the team won the county senior championship.

Murphy made his debut on the inter-county scene at the age of seventeen when he was selected for the Cork minor team. He enjoyed one championship season with the minor team, culminating with the winning of an All-Ireland medal in 1991. Murphy subsequently joined the Cork under-21, winning an All-Ireland medal in 1994. By this stage he had joined the Cork senior team after making his debut during the 1993 championship. An All-Ireland runner-up in his debut season, Murphy won three Munster medals.

== Honours ==
Clonakilty

- Cork Senior Football Championship (1): 1996 (c)

Cork

- Munster Senior Football Championship (3): 1993, 1994, 1995
- All-Ireland Under-21 Football Championship (1): 1994
- Munster Under-21 Football Championship (1): 1994
- All-Ireland Minor Football Championship (1): 1991
- Munster Minor Football Championship (1): 1991

Sporting positions
Preceded by Mark O'Connor	Cork Senior Football Captain; 1997	Succeeded by Ciarán O'Sullivan
