= 1990 All-Ireland Minor Football Championship =

Gaelic football competition

Championship details

All-Ireland Champions
- Winning team: Meath (2nd win)

All-Ireland Finalists
- Losing team: Kerry

Provincial Champions
- Munster: Kerry
- Leinster: Meath
- Ulster: Derry
- Connacht: Galway

The 1990 All-Ireland Minor Football Championship was the 59th staging of the All-Ireland Minor Football Championship, the Gaelic Athletic Association's premier inter-county Gaelic football tournament for boys under the age of 18.

Derry entered the championship as defending champions, however, they were defeated by Meath in the All-Ireland semi-final.

On 16 September 1990, Meath won the championship following a 2–11 to 2–9 defeat of Kerry in the All-Ireland final. This was their second All-Ireland title and their first title in 33 championship seasons.

== Results ==
=== Connacht Minor Football Championship ===
Quarter-Final

May 1990 Quarter-Final	Galway	5-17 - 2-4	Sligo	Kilcoyne Park, Tubbercurry

Semi-Finals

24 June 1990 Semi-Final	Leitrim	2-6 - 2-10	Roscommon	Dr Hyde Park, Roscommon

1 July 1990 Semi-Final	Galway	1-7 - 0-9	Mayo	St Jarlath's Park, Tuam

Final

22 July 1990 Final	Galway	1-18 - 2-3	Roscommon	Dr Hyde Park, Roscommon

=== Munster Minor Football Championship ===
Quarter-Finals

May 1990 Quarter-Final	Waterford	2-11 - 3-8	Limerick	Páirc Mhic Gearailt, Fermoy

May 1990 Quarter-Final	Kerry	2-13 - 2-5	Tipperary	Castleisland

Semi-Finals

June 1990 Semi-Final	Cork	2-23 - 2-2	Limerick	Páirc na nGael, Askeaton

June 1990 Semi-Final	Kerry	6-11 - 2-4	Clare	Lanesboro

Final

1 July 1990 Final	Kerry	1-10 - 0-3	Cork	Páirc Uí Chaoimh, Cork

=== Ulster Minor Football Championship ===
Preliminary Round

May 1990 Preliminary Round	Monaghan	0-9 - 1-8	Antrim	St Mary's Park, Castleblaney

Quarter-Finals

June 1990 Quarter-Final	Cavan	0-6 - 0-6	Donegal	MacCumhaill Park, Ballybofey

June 1990 Quarter-Final Replay	Cavan	0-9 - 1-7	Donegal	Breffni Park, Cavan

June 1990 Quarter-Final	Derry	2-21 - 1-7	Fermanagh	Celtic Park, Derry

June 1990 Quarter-Final	Tyrone	2-7 - 0-10	Armagh	Athletic Grounds, Armagh

June 1990 Quarter-Final	Down	1-8 - 1-8	Antrim	Pairc Esler, Newry

June 1990 Quarter-Final Replay	Down	1-11 - 0-9	Antrim	Casement Park, Belfast

Semi-Finals

June 1990 Semi-Final	Derry	3-6 - 2-6	Donegal	St Tiernach's Park, Clones

June 1990 Semi-Final	Tyrone	2-10 - 0-16	Down	Casement Park, Belfast

1 July 1990 Semi-Final Replay	Tyrone	1-9 - 2-11	Down	Casement Park, Belfast

Final

15 July 1990 Final	Derry	2-10 - 2-8	Down	St Tiernach's Park, Clones

=== Leinster Minor Football Championship ===
Preliminary Round

May 1990 Preliminary Round	Laois	4-13 - 1-2	Kilkenny	O'Moore Park, Portlaoise

May 1990 Preliminary Round	Louth	1-10 - 0-10	Wexford	Dr Cullen Park, Carlow

May 1990 Preliminary Round	Kildare	2-13 - 1-7	Wexford	Wexford Park, Wexford

May 1990 Preliminary Round	Longford	1-13 - 2-7	Dublin	Cusack Park, Mullingar

Quarter-Finals

June 1990 Quarter-Final	Louth	5-10 - 1-4	Dubline	Drogheda Park, Drogheda

June 1990 Quarter-Final	Laois	1-10 - 1-6	Offaly	O'Moore Park, Portlaoise

June 1990 Quarter-Final	Meath	2-16 - 2-9	Longford	Páirc Tailteann, Navan

June 1990 Quarter-Final	Kildare	0-12 - 1-7	Wicklow	Aughrim Park, Aughrim

Semi-Finals

July 1990 Semi-Final	Kildare	1-11 - 1-7	Louth	St Conleth's Park, Newbridge

July 1990 Semi-Final	Meath	1-11 - 3-4	Laois	Croke Park, Dublin

Final

29 July 1990 Final	Meath	1-19 - 1-6	Kildare	Croke Park, Dublin

=== All-Ireland Minor Football Championship ===
Semi-Finals

12 August 1990 Semi-Final	Galway	1-9 - 0-12	Kerry	Croke Park, Dublin

19 August 1990 Semi-Final	Meath	3-8 - 1-3	Derry	Croke Park, Dublin

26 August 1990 Semi-Final Replay	Galway	0-9 - 2-7	Kerry	Gaelic Grounds, Limerick

Final

16 September 1990 Final	Meath	2-11 - 2-09	Kerry	Croke Park, Dublin

== Championship statistics ==
=== Miscellaneous ===
- Hugh Carolan of Meath achieves a unique double by adding an All-Ireland medal to the Leinster Schools Rugby Senior Cup medal he earlier won with Blackrock College.
