= 2003 Cork Intermediate Football Championship =

Gaelic football competition

- Sponsor: Permanent TSB
- Champions: Ilen Rovers (1st title); Kieran Daly (captain); Tom Dogan (manager)
- Runners-up: Carrigaline

The 2003 Cork Intermediate Football Championship was the 68th staging of the Cork Intermediate Football Championship since its establishment by the Cork County Board in 1909.

The final was played on 2 November 2003 at Páirc Uí Rinn in Cork, between Ilen Rovers and Carrigaline, in what was their first ever meeting in the final. Ilen Rovers won the match by 0–15 to 0–07 to claim their first ever championship title.

== Results ==
=== Final ===
2 November 2003 Final	Ilen Rovers	0-15 - 0-07	Carrigaline	Páirc Uí Rinn
	K. O'Sullivan 0-6 (0-3 frees); E. Sheehy 0-3; D. Whooley 0-2; F. Collins, J. Whooley, D. Murphy, K. Daly 0-1 each.		E. O'Sullivan 0-2 (frees); M. Doody, O. Conlon, K. O'Keeffe, P. Murphy, N. Murphy 0-1 each.	Referee: N Brosnan (Killavullen)
