= Liam Honohan =

Irish Gaelic footballer (born 1969)

Personal information
- Native name: Liam Ó hUanacháin (Irish)
- Born: 17 April 1969 (age 57) Bishopstown, Cork, Ireland
- Occupation: Bank official
- Height: 6 ft 3 in (191 cm)

Sport
- Sport: Gaelic football
- Position: Midfield
Club
- Years: Club
- Bishopstown
Club titles
- Cork titles: 0
Inter-county*
Years	County	Apps (scores)
1993-1999	Cork	13 (0-03)
Inter-county titles
- Munster titles: 3
- All-Irelands: 0
- NFL: 1
- All Stars: 0
- *Inter County team apps and scores correct as of 10:53, 28 June 2017.

Liam Honohan (born 17 April 1969) is an Irish retired Gaelic footballer. His league and championship career with the Cork senior team lasted from 1992 until 1999.

Honohan made his debut on the inter-county scene at the age of seventeen when he was selected for the Cork minor team. He enjoyed one championship season with the minor team, however, he was an All-Ireland runner-up. Honohan subsequently joined the Cork under-21 team, winning an All-Ireland medal in 1989. After winning an All-Ireland medal with the Cork junior team, he made his senior debut during the 1992-93 league. An All-Ireland runner-up in his debut season, Honohan won three Munster medals and a National League medal.

== Honours ==
Cork

- Munster Senior Football Championship (3): 1993, 1994, 1995
- National Football League (1): 1998-99
- All-Ireland Junior Football Championship (1): 1990
- Munster Junior Football Championship (1): 1990
- All-Ireland Under-21 Football Championship (1): 1989
- Munster Under-21 Football Championship (1): 1989
- Munster Minor Football Championship (1): 1987
