= 1990 All-Ireland Under-21 Football Championship =

Gaelic football competition

Championship details

All-Ireland Champions
- Winning team: Kerry (6th win)
- Captain: Vincent Knightley

All-Ireland Finalists
- Losing team: Tyrone

Provincial Champions
- Munster: Kerry
- Leinster: Meath
- Ulster: Tyrone
- Connacht: Galway

The 1990 All-Ireland Under-21 Football Championship was the 27th staging of the competition since its inception by the Gaelic Athletic Association in 1964.

Cork entered the championship as the defending champions, but were defeated by Kerry in the Munster final.

On 13 May 1990, Kerry won the championship following a 5–12 to 2–11 defeat of Tyrone in the All-Ireland final. This was their sixth All-Ireland title overall and their first in 13 championship seasons.

== Results ==
=== All-Ireland Under-21 Football Championship ===
Semi-finals

| 29 April 1990 Semi-final | Kerry | 2-13 - 1-06 | Galway | Gaelic Grounds, Limerick |

| 6 May 1990 Semi-final | Tyrone | 2-10 - 1-09 | Meath | Breffni Park, Cavan |

Final

| 13 May 1990 Final | Kerry | 5-12 - 2-11 | Tyrone | Cusack Park, Mullingar |

== Statistics ==
=== Miscellaneous ===
- The All-Ireland semi-final between Tyrone and Meath is the first championship meeting between the two teams.
