= Paul Coleman (Gaelic footballer) =

Irish retired Gaelic footballer

Personal information
- Native name: Pól Ó Colmáin (Irish)
- Born: 1968 (age 57–58) Grenagh, County Cork, Ireland
- Occupation: Oil truck driver
- Height: 6 ft 3 in (191 cm)

Sport
- Sport: Gaelic football
- Position: Left corner-back
Club
- Years: Club
- Grenagh
Club titles
- Cork titles: 0
Inter-county*
| Years | County | Apps (scores) |
| 1991-1995 | Cork | 2 (0-00) |
Inter-county titles
- Munster titles: 3
- All-Irelands: 0
- NHL: 0
- All Stars: 0
- *Inter County team apps and scores correct as of 11:53, 28 June 2017.

Paul Coleman (born 1968) is an Irish retired Gaelic footballer. His league and championship career with the Cork senior team lasted from 1991 until 1995.

Coleman made his debut on the inter-county scene at the age of seventeen when he was selected for the Cork minor team. He had one championship season with the minor team, and was an All-Ireland runner-up. Coleman subsequently joined the Cork under-21 and junior teams, winning an All-Ireland medal with the juniors in 1990. He joined the Cork senior team during the 1991 championship. An All-Ireland runner-up in 1993, Coleman he won three Munster medals.

== Honours ==
Cork

- Munster Senior Football Championship (3): 1993, 1994, 1995
- All-Ireland Junior Football Championship (1): 1990
- Munster Junior Football Championship (2): 1990, 1992
- Munster Minor Football Championship (1): 1986
