= Kevin O'Dwyer =

Irish Gaelic footballer

Personal information
- Native name: Caoimhín Ó Duibhir (Irish)
- Nickname: Wirey
- Born: Skibbereen, County Cork
- Occupation: Garda Síochána
- Height: 5 ft 11 in (180 cm)

Sport
- Sport: Gaelic football
- Position: Goalkeeper
Club
- Years: Club
- 1990s-2000s: O'Donovan Rossa
Club titles
- Cork titles: 1
- Munster titles: 1
- All-Ireland Titles: 1
Inter-county
Years	County	Apps (scores)
1995-2005	Cork	35 (0-00)
Inter-county titles
- Munster titles: 5
- All-Irelands: 2
- NFL: 1
- All Stars: 1

Kevin O'Dwyer (born 1973 in Skibbereen, County Cork) is an Irish former Gaelic footballer. He played for his local club O'Donovan Rossa and was a member of the Cork senior inter-county team from 1995 until 2005.
