= Mark O'Sullivan (Gaelic footballer) =

Irish footballer (born 1973)

Personal information
- Native name: Marc Ó Súilleabháin (Irish)
- Born: 1973 (age 52–53) Newmarket, County Cork, Ireland
- Height: 6 ft 2 in (188 cm)

Sport
- Sport: Gaelic football
- Position: Full-forward
Club
- Years: Club
- Newmarket
Club titles
- Cork titles: 1
Inter-county*
Years	County	Apps (scores)
1994-2001	Cork	16 (3-16)
Inter-county titles
- Munster titles: 5
- All-Irelands: 2
- NFL: 1
- All Stars: 0
- *Inter County team apps and scores correct as of 11:11, 15 February 2014.

Mark O'Sullivan (born 1973) is an Irish retired Gaelic footballer who played as a full-forward for the Cork senior team.

Born in Newmarket, County Cork, O'Sullivan first arrived on the inter-county scene at the age of seventeen when he first linked up with the Cork minor team in 1991, before lining out with the under-21 side in 1994. Both teams were to win All Ireland titles. Two Sigerson Cup titles followed with UCC in 1994 and 1995. He made his senior debut for Cork in the 1994 championship, and went on to play for the team for the next seven years, winning three Munster medals and one National Football League medal. He was an All-Ireland runner-up on one occasion in the 1999 final.

As a member of the Munster inter-provincial team at various times, O'Sullivan won one Railway Cup medal in 1999. At club level, he is a one-time junior championship medallist with Newmarket in 1998.

Throughout his career, O'Sullivan made 16 championship appearances for Cork. He retired from inter-county football following the conclusion of the 2001 championship.

== Honours ==
=== Player ===
Cork Vocational Schools

- All-Ireland Vocational Schools Inter-county Championship (1): 1991

Newmarket

- Cork Junior Football Championship (1): 1998
- Duhallow Junior A Football Championship (2): 1993, 1998

University College Cork

- Sigerson Cup (2): 1994, 1995

Cork

- All-Ireland Minor Football Championship (1): 1991
- All-Ireland Under-21 Football Championship (1): 1994
- Munster Senior Football Championship (3): 1994, 1995, 1999
- National Football League (1): 1999

Munster

- Railway Cup (1): 1999
