= Brendan Walsh (Gaelic footballer) =

Irish Gaelic football player turned manager

Personal information
- Native name: Breandán Breathnach (Irish)
- Nickname: Brenner
- Born: 1973 (age 52–53) Clonakilty, County Cork, Ireland
- Occupations: Secondary school deputy principal
- Height: 5 ft 11 in (180 cm)

Sport
- Sport: Gaelic football
- Position: Right wing-forward
Club
- Years: Club
- 1992-2011: Clonakilty
Club titles
- Cork titles: 2
Inter-county*
Years	County	Apps (scores)
1998-2000	Cork	0 (0-00)
Inter-county titles
- Munster titles: 1
- All-Irelands: 0
- NFL: 1
- All Stars: 0
- *Inter County team apps and scores correct as of 18:05, 6 May 2019.

Brendan Walsh (born 1973) is an Irish Gaelic football manager and former player who played for Cork Senior Championship club Clonakilty. He played for the Cork senior football team for three years, during which time he usually lined out as a right wing-forward.

== Honours ==
Clonakilty

- Cork Senior Football Championship: 1996, 2009

Cork

- Munster Senior Football Championship: 1999
- National Football League: 1998-99
