= Douglas GAA =

Gaelic games club in County Cork, Ireland

Douglas
- Dúglas
- Founded: 1887
- County: Cork
- Colours
- Grounds: Galways Lane
- Coordinates: 51°52′28″N 8°26′34″W

Playing kits
Standard colours

Senior Club Championships
	All Ireland	Munster champions	Cork champions
Camogie:	0	0	2

Douglas Hurling and Football Club is a Gaelic Athletic Association club in Douglas, Cork, Ireland. The club is affiliated to the Seandún Board and fields teams in Gaelic football, hurling and camogie.

== History ==
Located in the suburb of Douglas on the southside of Cork, Douglas Hurling Club was founded in 1887 and took part in the first ever Cork SHC that year. The club went onto a period of decline and in 1918 a new club called Castletreasure represented the area. Following the breakup of the Castletreasure Club in 1926, there was no club in the parish until the St Columba's club was formed. This club was officially renamed Douglas Hurling and Football Club in 1938.

Hurling was initially the dominant sport in the club, however, Gaelic football made the breakthrough in 1962 when Douglas claimed the Cork JFC title. It would be 1997 before Douglas claimed the Cork IFC title. This was followed by a Cork IHC title in 2000, resulting in Douglas becoming a dual senior club.

Douglas came close to completing a league-championship double in 2008, however, they lost out to Nemo Rangers in the 2008 Cork SFC final. This disappointment was followed by Douglas beating Ballymartle to win the Cork PIHC title in 2009.

== Roll of honour ==
- Cork Senior Camogie Championship (2): 2008, 2011
- Kelleher Shield (1): 2008
- Cork Premier Intermediate Hurling Championship (1): 2009
- Cork Intermediate Hurling Championship (1): 2000
- Cork Intermediate Football Championship (1): 1997
- Cork Junior Football Championship (1): 1962
- Cork Junior B Inter-Divisional Football Championship (2): 2023, 2024
- Cork City Junior A Hurling Championship (3): 1966, 1983, 1984
- Cork City Junior A Football Championship (6): 1962, 1970, 1973, 2004, 2012, 2021
- Cork Under-21 Hurling Championship (1): 2016
- Cork Under-21 Football Championship (1): 2017
- Cork Minor Hurling Championship (2): 2015, 2022
- Cork Minor Football Championship (4): 2004, 2013, 2019, 2022

== Notable players ==
- Alan Cadogan: Munster SHC-winner (2014, 2017)
- Eoin Cadogan: All-Ireland SFC-winner (2010)
- Eoin Cotter: All-Ireland SFC-winner (2010)
- Shane Kingston: Munster SHC-winner (2017, 2018, 2025)
- Ronan McCarthy: Munster SFC-winner (1999, 2002)
