= Podsie O'Mahony =

Irish Gaelic footballer

Pádraig 'Podsie' O'Mahony
Personal information
- Native name: Pádraig Mac Mathúna (Irish)
- Nickname: Podsie
- Born: Ballincollig, County Cork
- Occupation: Publican

Sport
- Sport: Gaelic football
- Position: Left wing-forward
Club
- Years: Club
- 1990s-present: Ballincollig
Club titles
- Cork titles: 0
Inter-county
Years	County	Apps (scores)
1995-2001	Cork	12 (2-17)
Inter-county titles
- Munster titles: 2
- All-Irelands: 0
- NFL: 1
- All Stars: 0

Podsie O'Mahony (born 1973 in Ballincollig, County Cork) is a retired Irish sportsperson. He played Gaelic football with his local club Ballincollig and was a member of the Cork senior inter-county team from the 1990s until the 2000s.

O'Mahony, who played football as a forward, also played hurling. He played minor hurling for Cork and also played hurling through the ranks for his club Ballincollig.
