= 1994 All-Ireland Under-21 Football Championship =

Gaelic football competition

Championship details

All-Ireland Champions
- Winning team: Cork (9th win)
- Captain: Damian O'Neill

All-Ireland Finalists
- Losing team: Mayo

Provincial Champions
- Munster: Cork
- Leinster: Laois
- Ulster: Fermanagh
- Connacht: Mayo

The 1994 All-Ireland Under-21 Football Championship was the 31st staging of the All-Ireland Under-21 Football Championship since its establishment by the Gaelic Athletic Association in 1964.

Meath entered the championship as defending champions, however, they were defeated by Laois in the Leinster final.

On 28 August 1994, Cork won the championship following a 1-12 to 1-5 defeat of Mayo in the All-Ireland final. This was their ninth All-Ireland title overall and their first in five championship seasons.

== Results ==
=== All-Ireland Under-21 Football Championship ===
Finals

28 August 1994 Final	Cork	1-12 - 1-05	Mayo	Cusack Park, Ennis

== Statistics ==
=== Miscellaneous ===
- The All-Ireland semi-finals see two first-time championship clashes as Cork play Laois and Fermanagh play Mayo for the first time in the history of the championship.
