= 1991 All-Ireland Minor Football Championship =

Gaelic football competition

All-Ireland Minor Football Championship 1991
Championship details
- Dates: 4 May - 15 September 1991
- Teams: 32

All-Ireland Champions
- Winning team: Cork (8th win)
- Captain: Alan McCarthy
- Manager: Éamonn Ryan

All-Ireland Finalists
- Losing team: Mayo
- Captain: Ronan Golding
- Manager: Martin Carney

Provincial Champions
- Munster: Cork
- Leinster: Kildare
- Ulster: Donegal
- Connacht: Mayo

Championship statistics
- No. matches played: 33
- Top Scorer: Podsie O'Mahony (0-27)

The 1991 All-Ireland Minor Football Championship was the 60th staging of the All-Ireland Minor Football Championship since its establishment by the Gaelic Athletic Association in 1929.

Meath entered the championship as the defending champions, however, they were defeated by Dublin in a Leinster first round replay.

The All-Ireland final was played on 15 September 1991 between Cork and Mayo, in what was their first meeting in a final in six years. Cork won the match by 1-09 to 1-07 to claim their eighth championship title overall and their first title since 1981.

Cork's Podsie O'Mahony was the championship's top scorer with 0-27.

== Results ==
=== Connacht Minor Football Championship ===
==== Connacht first round ====
11 May 1991 First round	Sligo	0-06 - 4-14	Leitrim	Kilcoyne Park
	C White 0-2, M Doyle 0-2, A Lang 0-1, R Keane 0-1.		P McKenna 2-2, G Bohan 0-6, C Griffin 1-2, S McWeeney 1-0, D Leydon 0-1, G Foley 0-1, B Deignan 0-1, G Gilraine 0-1.

==== Connacht semi-finals ====
23 June 1991 Semi-final	Mayo	1-13 - 1-07	Galway	MacHale Park
	R Ruane 0-6, K O'Neill 1-1, R Golding 0-3, D Burke 0-2, F Glynn 0-1.		E O'Reilly 1-2, C St. John 0-2, M Kelly 0-2, J Fallon 0-1.

30 June 1991 Semi-final	Leitrim	2-13 - 1-05	Roscommon	Páirc Seán Mac Diarmada
	G Bohan 0-7, S Quinn 1-0, D Leydon 1-0, B Duignan 0-2, P McKenna 0-2, P Connolly 0-1, G Foley 0-1.		C Coleman 1-0, T Finneran 0-3, D Washington 0-2.

==== Connacht final ====
14 July 1991 Final	Mayo	4-09 - 0-06	Leitrim	MacHale Park
	R Ruane 1-5, R Golding 2-0, K O'Neill 1-1, F Glynn 0-1, TJ McHugh 0-1, I Walkin 0-1.		G Bohan 0-2, S Quinn 0-2, P Connolly 0-1, G Foley 0-1.

=== Leinster Minor Football Championship ===
==== Leinster first round ====
4 May 1991 First round	Kilkenny	1-03 - 1-15	Laois	Nowlan Park
			D Delaney 1-9, G O'Sullivan 0-2, J Larkin 0-1, L O'Connor 0-1, N Delaney 0-1, D Sweeney 0-1.

4 May 1991 First round	Louth	3-10 - 1-06	Longford	Drogheda Park
	A Doherty 1-5, M Quigley 2-0, M Butterly 0-1, A Delaney 0-1, P Kelly 0-1, M Campbell 0-1, J Hynes 0-1.		C Kenny 0-4, B Donlon 1-0, S Donlon 0-1, T Donlon 0-1.

4 May 1991 First round	Dublin	2-05 - 1-08	Meath	Parnell Park
	D Brady 1-1, C Durcan 1-0, R Boyle 0-2, T Dunne 0-1, E Van Boxtel 0-1.		C Sheridan 1-4, P Sullivan 0-2, G Geraghty 0-1.

4 May 1991 First round	Carlow	0-06 - 5-10	Wexford	Dr. Cullen Park

11 May 1991 First round replay	Meath	1-08 - 1-14 (aet)	Dublin	Walterstown GFC Grounds
	C Sheridan 1-3, D Curtis 0-2, T Smith 0-1, A Ashe 0-1, P O'Brien 0-1.		R Boyle 1-3, G Walsh 0-5, D Brady 0-2, P McGrane 0-2, M Byrne 0-1, D Harrington 0-1.

==== Leinster quarter-finals ====
18 May 1991 Quarter-final	Louth	0-04 - 0-07	Kildare	Drogheda Park
	A Delaney 0-2, N Butterly 0-2.		P Kerrigan 0-5, D Lackey 0-1, Gribben 0-1.

18 May 1991 Quarter-final	Dublin	4-13 - 1-03	Wicklow	Parnell Park
	D Brady 2-2, R Boyle 1-3, C Durkan 1-1, G Walsh 0-4, P McGrane 0-2, T Dunne 0-1.		S Farrell 1-0, McGillycuddy 0-2, R Coffey 0-1.

18 May 1991 Quarter-final	Laois	1-15 - 1-11	Westmeath	O'Moore Park
	D Sweeney 1-4, D Delaney 0-3, D Lawlor 0-2, G O'Sullivan 0-2, N Delaney 0-2, H Emerson 0-1, L O'Connor 0-1.		A Gavin 1-3, S Behan 0-3, T Lennon 0-2, K Gunning 0-2, J Dunning 0-1.

19 May 1991 Quarter-final	Offaly	3-10 - 2-09	Wexford	Dr. Cullen Park
	S Gavin 1-2, N Claffey 0-5, E Byrne 1-1, D Hanlon 1-0, F Wyer 0-2.		D O'Reilly 1-1, E O'Neill 1-0, T Farrell 0-3, S Doran 0-2, P White 0-1, J Byrne 0-1, D Wall 0-1.

==== Leinster semi-finals ====
6 July 1991 Semi-final	Kildare	2-13 - 1-08	Laois	Croke Park
	N Buckley 1-3, P Kerrigan 0-6, T Sullivan 1-1, D Lackey 0-2, L Donlon 0-1.		D Delaney 1-3, H Emerson 0-2, G O'Sullivan 0-2, D Bracken 0-1.

14 July 1991 Semi-final	Dublin	0-10 - 1-06	Offaly	Croke Park
	G Walsh 0-4, R Boyle 0-3, A Dunne 0-1, M Byrne 0-1, J McAllister 0-1.		E Byrne 1-0, C McEvoy 0-3, M Daly 0-2, R Hartnett 0-1.

==== Leinster final ====
10 August 1991 Final	Kildare	2-08 - 0-12	Dublin	Croke Park
	B Merrigan 1-5, T Sullivan 1-0, N Buckley 0-1, M Colbert 0-1, G Dunne 0-1.		A Dunne 0-4, C Walsh 0-3, D Brady 0-3, P McGrane 0-1, D Lee 0-1.

=== Munster Minor Football Championship ===
==== Munster first round ====
10 May 1991 First round	Cork	4-19 - 0-03	Limerick	Buttevant GAA Grounds
	J Kavanagh 1-6, K Harrington 2-1, P O'Rourke 0-5, P O'Mahony 0-4, D Linehan 1-0, P Hegarty 0-1, F Collins 0-1, L O'Sullivan 0-1.		D Brazil 0-2, P Corrivan 0-1.

16 May 1991 First round	Kerry	3-11 - 1-05	Clare	Con Brosnan Park
	F McEllistrim 2-1, S Culloty 1-2, C O'Grady 0-5, J O'Connell 0-1, K Burns 0-1, E Bower 0-1.		F Lohan 1-0, J Garvey 0-3, A Daly 0-1, C Lynch 0-1.	Referee: M O'Connell (Limerick)

==== Munster semi-finals ====
9 July 1991 Semi-final	Cork	5-17 - 0-04	Waterford	Clonmult Memorial Park
	P O'Mahony 0-10, K Harrington 2-0, J Kavanagh 0-5, S Barrett 1-1, D Hegarty 1-1, D Linehan 1-0.		B Arrigan 0-2, R Ryan 0-2.	Referee: P Sheehy (Kerry)

11 July 1991 Semi-final	Tipperary	1-05 - 1-10	Kerry	Clonmel GAA Ground
	R Tomlinson 1-0, K Counan 0-2, J Finn 0-2, D O'Neill 0-1.		S Culloty 1-2, J O'Connell 0-5, S Moynihan 0-1, C O'Grady 0-1, C Byrnes 0-1.	Referee: JJ Landers (Waterford)

==== Munster final ====
21 July 1991 Final	Kerry	0-08 - 0-10	Cork	FitzGerald Stadium
	C O'Grady 0-4, S Culloty 0-2, C Burns 0-1, G McGrath 0-1.		Kavanagh 0-4, P O'Mahony 0-4, F Collins 0-1, K Harrington 0-1.	Referee: JJ Landers (Waterford)

=== Ulster Minor Football Championship ===
==== Ulster preliminary round ====
19 May 1991 Preliminary round	Tyrone	2-06 - 0-10	Derry	Healy Park
	S Treacy 1-2, O Gormley 1-1, M Mulgrew 0-1, D Farrell 0-1, C Donnelly 0-1.		G Biggs 0-3, G McGonigle 0-2, E Cassidy 0-2, K Diamond 0-1, D Murray 0-1, G Diamond 0-1.

==== Ulster quarter-finals ====
26 May 1991 Quarter-final	Antrim	0-06 - 1-08	Fermanagh	Casement Park
	G Adams 0-1, M Mulligan 0-1, G Thornton 0-1, G Brown 0-1, D Rafferty 0-1, S Healy 0-1.		R Gallagher 1-5, M McCaffrey 0-1, M O'Donnell 0-1, S King 0-1.

2 June 1991 Quarter-final	Donegal	3-07 - 1-07	Cavan	MacCumhaill Park
	R McLoughlin 2-1, M Boyle 1-2, O McBride 0-3, S Diver 0-1.		M McManus 1-1, J McCarthy 0-3, C Sheridan 0-2, C Flood 0-1.

9 June 1991 Quarter-final	Down	3-08 - 6-06	Armagh	Páirc Esler
	P Burns 2-0, C McAlarney 1-0, A Lester 0-3, G Murdoch 0-3, D Harris 0-1, C McCartan 0-1.		D Macklin 3-1, C Lavery 2-0, B O'Hagan 1-3, D O'Neill 0-1, B Hughes 0-1.

16 June 1991 Quarter-final	Tyrone	3-10 - 1-09	Monaghan	Celtic Park
	S Treacy 0-8, C Rafferty 1-0, E Gormley 1-0, C McCaughey 1-0 (og), D Farrell 0-2.		M Slowey 1-4, B Flanagan 0-2, N McGuinness 0-2, G Flanagan 0-1.

==== Ulster semi-finals ====
23 June 1991 Semi-final	Donegal	0-14 - 1-05	Fermanagh	Healy Park
	D Buggy 0-5, M Boyle 0-3, D Boyle 0-2, R McLaughlin 0-2, A Travers 0-1, K Gallagher 0-1.		R Gallagher 0-5, M O'Donnell 1-0.

30 June 1991 Semi-final	Armagh	1-07 - 1-07	Tyrone	Athletic Grounds
	D Marsden 1-4, C Lavery 0-1, B O'Hagan 0-1, D McCluskey 0-1.		D Farrell 1-1, S Treacy 0-2, C Donnelly 0-1, M Mulgrew 0-1, E Gormley 0-1, J McAleer 0-1.

14 July 1991 Semi-final replay	Armagh	1-12 - 2-10	Tyrone	Athletic Grounds
	D Mackin 1-4, B O'Hagan 0-3, D Marsden 0-2, D O'Neill 0-2, P McKeever 0-1.		J McAleer 1-1, R McGarrity 1-1, D Sonner 0-2, M Mulgrew 0-2, C Donnelly 0-1, E Gormley 0-1, D O'Neill 0-1, B Mallon 0-1.	Referee: A O'Neill (Derry)

==== Ulster final ====
28 July 1991 Final	Donegal	1-10 - 1-09	Tyrone	St. Tiernach's Park
	M Boyle 1-2, D Boyle 0-2, D Buggy 0-2, R McLoughlin 0-1, C Brennan 0-1, K Gallagher 0-1, J Ruane 0-1.		C Donnelly 0-4, E Gormley 1-0, D O'Neill 0-3, Martin Mulgrew 0-1, Marcus Mulgrew 0-1.	Referee: K Brolly (Derry)

=== All-Ireland Minor Football Championship ===
==== All-Ireland semi-finals ====
11 August 1991 Semi-final	Cork	0-12 - 1-06	Donegal	Croke Park
	P O'Mahony 0-5, S Barrett 0-2, K Harrington 0-2, T Óg Lynch 0-1, P Hegarty 0-1, M O'Sullivan 0-1.		M Boyle 1-1, D Buggy 0-4, E McMenamin 0-1.

18 August 1991 Semi-final	Mayo	1-12 - 2-03	Kildare	Croke Park
	D Burke 0-4, K O'Neill 0-4, R Golding 1-0, P Cunney 0-2, P McNamara 0-1, T Walkin 0-1, TJ McHugh 0-1.		T Sullivan 2-0, N Buckley 0-2, G Dunne 0-1.	Referee: P Russell (Tipperary)

==== All-Ireland final ====
15 September 1991 Final	Cork	1-09 - 1-07	Mayo	Croke Park
	S Barrett 1-2, P O'Mahony 0-4, J Kavanagh 0-2, M O'Sullivan 0-1.		R Golding 1-1, D Burke 0-3, P McNamara 0-2, K O'Neill 0-1.	Referee: T Campbell (Cavan)
