= 1996–97 National Football League (Ireland) =

Irish football league

League details
- Dates: 13 October 1996 – 4 May 1997
- Teams: 33

League champions
- Winners: Kerry (16th win)
- Captain: Mike Hassett
- Manager: Páidí Ó Sé

League runners-up
- Runners-up: Cork
- Captain: Niall Cahalane
- Manager: Larry Tompkins

Other division winners
- Division 2: Louth
- Division 3: Down
- Division 4: Offaly

The 1996–97 National Football League, known for sponsorship reasons as the Church & General National Football League, was the 66th staging of the National Football League (NFL), an annual Gaelic football tournament for the Gaelic Athletic Association county teams of Ireland.

== Format ==
The teams are in four divisions, three of 8 teams and one of 9. Each team plays all the other teams in its division once: either home or away. Teams earn 2 points for a winn and 1 for a draw. The top two teams in Divisions 2, 3 and 4 are promoted, while the bottom two teams in Divisions 1, 2 and 3 are relegated.

Eight teams contest the NFL quarter-finals:

- The top 4 teams in Division 1
- The top 2 teams in Division 2
- The first-placed teams in Divisions 3 and 4

=== Promotion and relegation ===
At the point at which the league was played, promotion and relegation was to be as follows:

- Division One: bottom 2 teams demoted to Division Two
- Division Two: top 2 teams promoted to Division One. Bottom 2 teams demoted to Division Three.
- Division Three: top 2 teams promoted to Division Two. Bottom 2 teams demoted to Division Four.
- Division Four: top 2 teams promoted to Division Three.

After the season had finished, it was decided to move to a 'mixed-ability' league for a one-season experiment in the 1997–98 NFL season, which meant that there was no relegation or promotion in 1996–97.

== Results and tables ==
=== Division 1 ===
| Team | Pld | W | D | L | Pts | Status |
|---|---|---|---|---|---|---|
| Kildare | 7 | 5 | 0 | 2 | 10 | Advance to Knockout stage |
| Kerry | 7 | 5 | 0 | 2 | 10 | Advance to Knockout stage |
| Derry | 7 | 4 | 1 | 2 | 9 | Advance to Knockout stage |
| Cork | 7 | 3 | 2 | 2 | 8 | Advance to Knockout stage |
| Tyrone | 7 | 2 | 1 | 4 | 5 |
| Meath | 7 | 2 | 1 | 4 | 5 |
| Cavan | 7 | 2 | 1 | 4 | 5 |
| Donegal | 7 | 1 | 2 | 4 | 4 |

=== Division 2 ===
==== Play-Off ====
| 31 March 1997 For 6th Place | Mayo | 0-7 — 0-4 | Clare | Tuam |

==== Division 2 ====
| Team | Pld | W | D | L | Pts | Status |
|---|---|---|---|---|---|---|
| Louth | 7 | 5 | 0 | 2 | 10 | Advance to Knockout stage |
| Laois | 7 | 5 | 0 | 2 | 10 | Laois advanced to Knock out stage as Division 2 Runner Up |
| Dublin | 7 | 3 | 2 | 2 | 8 | Laois advanced to Knock out stage as Division 2 Runner Up |
| Leitrim | 7 | 3 | 1 | 3 | 7 | Laois advanced to Knock out stage as Division 2 Runner Up |
| Armagh | 7 | 2 | 3 | 2 | 7 | Laois advanced to Knock out stage as Division 2 Runner Up |
| Mayo | 7 | 2 | 2 | 3 | 6 | Laois advanced to Knock out stage as Division 2 Runner Up |
| Clare | 7 | 3 | 0 | 4 | 6 | Laois advanced to Knock out stage as Division 2 Runner Up |
| Monaghan | 7 | 1 | 0 | 6 | 2 | Laois advanced to Knock out stage as Division 2 Runner Up |

=== Division 3 ===
| Team | Pld | W | D | L | Pts | Status |
|---|---|---|---|---|---|---|
| Down | 7 | 5 | 2 | 0 | 12 | Advance to knockout stage |
| Roscommon | 7 | 5 | 1 | 1 | 11 |
| Wicklow | 7 | 5 | 0 | 2 | 10 |
| Westmeath | 7 | 4 | 0 | 3 | 8 |
| Galway | 7 | 3 | 1 | 3 | 7 |
| Antrim | 7 | 2 | 0 | 5 | 4 |
| Longford | 7 | 1 | 1 | 5 | 3 |
| Sligo | 7 | 0 | 1 | 6 | 1 |

=== Division 4 ===
Offaly won, with Fermanagh finishing second.

== Knockout stage ==
=== Quarter-finals ===
6 April 1997

| Laois | 4-10 – 1-13 | Derry |
|---|---|---|
| Hugh Emerson 3 goals |

6 April 1997

| Kerry | 1-18 – 0-10 | Down |

Dublin

7 April 1997
3:15 p.m.

| Kildare | 0-9 – 0-8 | Offaly |

Navan

6 April 1997

| Cork | 1-12 - 0-11 | Louth |
|---|---|---|
| Corkery (1-7, 1pen, 4f), Corcoran (0-2), Dorgan (0-1), C. O'Sullivan (0-1), O. O'Sullivan (0-1) | | Butterly (0-4), White (0-2, 1f), Curran (0-2), S. O'Hanlon (0-1), Kelly (0-1), Donaldson (0-1) |

O'Moore Park Portlaoise
Referee: S. Prior (Leitrim)

| GK | 1 | Kevin O'Dwyer (O'Donovan Rossa) |
| RCB | 2 | Ronan McCarthy (Douglas) |
| FB | 3 | Mark O'Connor (Bantry Blues) |
| LCB | 4 | Owen Sexton (Kilbrittain) |
| RHB | 5 | Ciarán O'Sullivan (Urhan) |
| CHB | 6 | Niall Cahalane (Castlehaven) (c) |
| LHB | 7 | Martin Cronin (Nemo Rangers) |
| MF | 8 | Damien O'Neill (Bantry Blues) |
| MF | 9 | Liam Honohan (Bishopstown) |
| RHF | 10 | Michael O'Donovan (Mallow) |
| CHF | 11 | Steven O'Brien (Nemo Rangers) |
| LHF | 12 | Brian Corcoran (Erin's Own) |
| RCF | 13 | Ollie O'Sullivan (Garnish) |
| FF | 14 | Colin Corkery (Nemo Rangers) |
| LCF | 15 | Aidan Dorgan (Grenagh) |
Substitutes:
| | 16 | Seán Óg Ó hAilpín (Na Piarsaigh) for Honohan |
| | 17 | John Buckley (Knocknagree) for Ollie O'Sullivan |
| | 18 | Mark Farr (Dohenys) for O'Connor |

| GK | 1 | Niall O'Donnell (Clan na Gael) |
| RCB | 2 | Nicky Malone (Lann Léire) |
| FB | 3 | Gareth O'Neill (Cooley Kickhams) |
| LCB | 4 | Ray Rooney (Dundalk Gaels) |
| RHB | 5 | Gerry Curran (Clan na Gael) |
| CHB | 6 | John Donaldson (Stabannon Parnells) |
| LHB | 7 | Stephen Melia (O'Dwyers, Dublin) |
| MF | 8 | Séamus O'Hanlon (Clan na Gael) (c) |
| MF | 9 | Ken Reilly (Stabannon Parnells) |
| RHF | 10 | Alan Rooney (St Mary's) |
| CHF | 11 | David Reilly (Stabannon Parnells) |
| LHF | 12 | Colin Kelly (Newtown Blues) |
| RCF | 13 | Stefan White (Clan na Gael) |
| FF | 14 | Cathal O'Hanlon (Clan na Gael) |
| LCF | 15 | Pat Butterly (Stabannon Parnells) |
Substitutes:
| | 16 | Ollie McDonnell (St Joseph's) for A. Rooney |
| | 17 | Brendan Kerin (St Mary's) for D. Reilly |
| | 18 | Alan Doherty (St Mary's) for Butterly |

=== Semi-finals ===
20 April 1997

| Kerry | 2-13 – 1-10 | Laois |

Croke Park, Dublin

21 April 1997

| Cork | 2-10 – 1-9 | Kildare |

Croke Park, Dublin

=== Final ===
4 May 1997

| Kerry | 3-7 – 1-8 | Cork |

Páirc Uí Chaoimh, Cork
Attendance: 28,795
Referee: Pat Casserly (Westmeath)
