= 1997 Cork Senior Football Championship =

Gaelic football competition

- Dates: 10 May 1997 – 9 November 1997
- Teams: 25
- Sponsor: TSB Bank
- Champions: Beara (6th title); Ollie Rue O'Sullivan (captain); Donal O'Sullivan (manager)
- Runners-up: Castlehaven; Niall Cahalane (captain); Christy Collins (manager)

Tournament statistics
- Matches played: 26
- Goals scored: 46 (1.77 per match)
- Points scored: 562 (21.62 per match)
- Top scorer(s): Ciarán O'Sullivan (1-24)

The 1997 Cork Senior Football Championship was the 109th staging of the Cork Senior Football Championship since its establishment by the Cork County Board in 1887. The draw for the opening fixtures took place on 8 December 1996. The championship began on 10 May 1997 and ended on 9 November 1997.

Clonakilty entered the championship as the defending champions, however, they were defeated by Muskerry in the second round.

On 9 November 1997, Beara won the championship following a 1-10 to 1-07 defeat of Castlehaven in a replay of the final. This was their 6th championship title overall and their first title since 1967.

Beara's Ciarán O'Sullivan was the championship's top scorer with 1-24.

== Team changes ==
=== To Championship ===
Promoted from the Cork Intermediate Football Championship

- Clyda Rovers

== Results ==
=== First round ===
| 10 May 1997 First round | O'Donovan Rossa | 0-13 - 0-10 | Glanmire | Innishannon |
| | J Werner 0-5, Mick McCarthy 0-2, B Casey 0-1, Mick "Straw" McCarthy 0-1, D McCarthy 0-1, B McCarthy 0-1, B O'Donovan 0-1, N Murphy 0-1. | | T McCarthy 0-4, P Ryan 0-3, G Murphy 0-2, B O'Callaghan 0-1. | Referee: R o'Sullivan (Kilmurry) |

| 11 May 1997 First round | Cork Regional Technical College | 0-12 - 2-10 | Dohenys | Innishannon |
| | G Keane 0-5, K O'Shea 0-2, J O'Connell 0-2, M Radley 0-1, R Cahill 0-1, P McCarthy 0-1. | | C Crowley 0-5, E Lehane 1-1, Michael Farr 1-0, T Buckley 0-3, M O'Donovan 0-1. | Referee: W Horgan (Brian Dillons) |

| 17 May 1997 First round | Carrigdhoun | 1-06 - 0-12 | Duhallow | Ballincollig |
| | N Murphy 1-0, M Kelleher 0-1, J o'Donovan 0-1, J Wallace 0-1, J Murphy 0-1, C O'Donovan 0-1, D Horan 0-1 | | D O'Sullivan 0-7, J Hourly 0-2, S Walsh 0-1, W O'Leary 0-1, M Angland 0-1. | Referee: R O'Sullivan (Kilmurry) |

| 17 May 1997 First round | Nemo Rangers | 1-11 - 2-09 | Bantry Blues | Castlehaven |
| | S Calnan 1-2, C Corkery 0-4, J Kavanagh 0-3, M Cronin 0-1, L O'Sullivan 0-1. | | P Clifford 0-6, S Dineen 1-1, A Farrelly 1-0, J Canty 0-1, S McCarthy 0-1. | Referee: N Barrett (Carrigtwohill) |

| 17 May 1997 First round | St. Nicholas' | 1-09 - 0-10 | Seandún | Bishopstown |
| | B McSweeney 0-4, R Brosnan 1-0, N Byrnes 0-2, T Browne 0-2, C Buckley 0-1. | | R McCarthy 0-6, D McElhinney 0-1, B O'Keeffe 0-1, T O'Sullivan 0-1, M O'Neill 0-1. | Referee: J Motherway (Aghada) |

| 18 May 1997 First round | Bishopstown | 1-09 - 1-16 | Muskerry | Charlie Hurley Park, Bandon |
| | P McGrath 0-7, P Murray 1-0, B Healy 0-1, L Honohan 0-1. | | N Twomey 1-5, A Dorgan 0-5, J O'Driscoll 0-3, P Concannon 0-1, TJ O'Leary 0-1, SF Cronin 0-1. | Referee: Cummins |

| 18 May 1997 First round | Aghada | 4-07 - 5-05 | Mallow | Fitzgerald Park, Fermoy |
| | Michael Lewis 2-1, C Counihan 1-2, K O'Keeffe 1-0, R Lewis 0-2, M Lewis 0-1, R Dwane 0-1. | | R Sheehan 2-3, A Aherne 2-1, S O'Leary 1-1. |

| 18 May 1997 First round | Carbery | 0-14 - 1-11 | Imokilly | Ovens |
| | J Whooley 0-5, S Cronin 0-3, B O'Sullivan 0-2, F Connolly 0-1, F Collins 0-1, M Cronin 0-1, B Harte 0-1. | | S Collins 1-0, D Barrett 0-3, B Corcoran 0-2, T Hickey 0-2, D Walsh 0-2, T McCarthy 0-1, S Barrett 0-1. | Referee: J Kearney (Na Piarsaigh) |

| 18 May 1997 First round | Castlehaven | 1-12 - 0-10 | Avondhu | Macroom |
| | J Cleary 0-5, D Cahalane 0-4, L Tomkins 1-0, F Cahalane 0-1, N Cahalane 0-1, C Crowley 0-1. | | E Pierce 0-5, M Gammell 0-2, K McCarthy 0-1, JD Murphy 0-1, P O'Connell 0-1. | Referee: P Higgins (Ballincollig) |

| 23 May 1997 First round replay | Carbery | 1-23 - 3-21 (aet) | Imokilly | Ovens |
| | J Whooley 1-5, M Cronin 0-6, D O'Donoghue 0-5, P Condon 0-2, P Hegarty 0-1, B Harte 0-1, F Collins 0-1, B O'Sullivan 0-1, C Cronin 0-1. | | T Hickey 1-3, JJ Kearney 1-1, T McCarthy 1-1, J O'Connell 0-4, D Barrett 0-4, N Gubbins 0-3, D Walsh 0-2, B Corcoran 0-2, B Fitzgerald 0-1. |

=== Second round ===
| 18 May 1997 Second round | Beara | 0-13 - 1-09 | Clyda Rovers | Sam Maguire Park, Dunmanway |
| | C O'Sullivan 0-9, M Harrington 0-2, S Spencer 0-1, J O'Sullivan 0-1. | | R Walsh 0-5, J Walsh 1-1, C O'Sullivan 0-2, G Ambrose 0-1. | Referee: M Collins (Clonakilty) |

| 24 May 1997 Second round | St. Finbarr's | 0-10 - 2-06 | Dohenys | Cloughduv |
| | F Murray 0-3, J O'Donoghue 0-2, F O'Mahony 0-2, B O'Shea 0-1, K Kelleher 0-1, P O'Keeffe 0-1. | | F Collins 1-1, C Crowley 1-0, S Mohan 0-2, T Buckley 0-2, M O'Donovan 0-1. | Referee: N Barrett (Carrigtwohill) |

| 24 May 1997 Second round | University College Cork | 0-17 - 0-06 | O'Donovan Rossa | Clonakilty |
| | M O'Sullivan 0-7, K O'Dwyer 0-4, G Crowley 0-2, E Fitzmaurice 0-1, J Deane 0-1, M Cronin 0-1, S Downey 0-1. | | M McCarthy 0-2, N Murphy 0-2, J Werner 0-1, B O'Donovan 0-1. | Referee: G Harrington (Carrigaline) |

| 24 May 1997 Second round | Na Piarsaigh | 0-10 - 0-09 | Bantry Blues | Clonakilty |
| | M Mullins 0-4, S Hegarty 0-2, G Casey 0-1, P O'Flynn 0-1, K Butterworth 0-1, C O'Sullivan 0-1. | | S Dineen 0-4, G Barry 0-2, J Canty 0-1, P O'Regan 0-1, G Connolly 0-1. | Referee: R O'Sullivan (Kilmurry) |

| 24 May 1997 Second round | Ballincollig | 1-11 - 3-08 | Duhallow | Grenagh |
| | P O'Mahony 0-7, F Keohane 1-2, E Long 0-1, J Miskella 0-1. | | D O'Sullivan 1-3, J Herlihy 1-0, J Dennehy 1-0, W O'Leary 0-2, D Culloty 0-1, S Walsh 0-1, M Leahy 0-1. | Referee: J Kearney (Na Piarsaigh) |

| 25 May 1997 Second round | Clonakilty | 1-11 - 1-12 | Muskerry | Páirc Naomh Eoin, Newcestown |
| | T Dillon 1-1, E O'Mahony 0-4, B Walsh 0-3, K Quirke 0-2, M Harrington 0-1. | | N Twomey 1-2, A Dorgan 0-4, D Kelleher 0-2, TJ O'Leary 0-1, G McPolin 0-1, S Coughlan 0-1, J O'Driscoll 0-1. | Referee: J Cummins (Glanworth) |

| 25 May 1997 Second round | Castlehaven | 2-13 - 1-14 | St. Nicholas' | Páirc Naomh Eoin, Newcestown |
| | J Cleary 0-6, C Crowley 1-2, N Cahalane 1-1, M O'Mahony 0-2, L Tompkins 0-1, D Murnane 0-1. | | M Brosnan 0-5, C Buckley 1-0, D Cooper 0-3, N Byrnes 0-2, R Brosnan 0-2, T Browne 0-1, R Kelleher 0-1. | Referee: N Barrett (Carrigtwohill) |

| 5 July 1997 Second round | Mallow | 1-10 - 0-15 | Imokilly | Fitzgerald Park, Fermoy |
| | R Sheehan 1-6, A Aherne 0-3, T O'Riordan 0-1. | | N O'Neill 0-4, D Walsh 0-3, J O'Connell 0-2, D Barrett 0-2, T McCarthy 0-2, S Collins 0-1, B Corcoran 0-1. | Referee: W Horagn (Brian Dillons) |

=== Quarter-finals ===
| 27 July 1997 Quarter-final | Beara | 2-10 - 1-07 | Na Piarsaigh | Sam Maguire Park, Dunmanway |
| | C O'Sullivan 1-3, S Spenser 1-2, A O'Regan 0-3, BJ O'Sullivan 0-1, C O'Neill 0-1. | | B Kidney 1-0, G Daly 0-3, M Mullins 0-2, S Hegarty 0-1, P O'Flynn 0-1. | Referee: M Collins (Clonakilty) |

| 27 July 1997 Quarter-final | Castlehaven | 0-14 - 0-08 | University College Cork | Sam Maguire Park, Dunmanway |
| | J Cleary 0-5, L Tompkins 0-3, F Cahalane 0-2, B Deasy 0-2, C Crowley 0-1, A Crowley 0-1. | | C Dwyer 0-6, M O'Sullivan 0-1, J Crowley 0-1. | Referee: N Barrett (Carrigtwohill) |

| 9 August 1997 Quarter-final | Duhallow | 1-10 - 1-08 | Muskerry | Kanturk |
| | Dermot O'Sullivan 0-8, W O'Leary 1-0, J Dennehy 0-1, J Herlihy 0-1. | | J Twomey 1-2, D Kelleher 0-3, A Dorgan 0-1, A O'Shea 0-1, P Concannon 0-1. |

| 16 August 1997 Quarter-final | Imokilly | 1-15 - 0-09 | Dohenys | Páirc Liam Mhic Cárthaigh, Ballygarvan |
| | D Barrett 0-7, JJ Kearney 1-2, M Daly 0-2, S Collins 0-1, D Walsh 0-1, J O'Connell 0-1, B Corcoran 0-1. | | T Buckley 0-4, C Crowley 0-3, F Collins 0-1, M Farr 0-1. | Referee: J Cummins (Glanworth) |

=== Semi-finals ===
| 24 August 1997 Semi-final | Beara | 0-15 - 0-07 | Duhallow | Macroom |
| | C O'Sullivan 0-5, N Murphy 0-3, M Harrington 0-2, A O'Regan 0-2, S Spenser 0-1, R O'Dwyer 0-1, B O'Sullivan 0-1. | | D O'Sullivan 0-3, S Walsh 0-2, W O'Leary 0-1, J Herlihy 0-1. | Referee: R O'Sullivan (Kilmurry) |

| 31 August 1997 Semi-final | Castlehaven | 1-14 - 0-04 | Imokilly | Páirc Uí Rinn, Cork |
| | L Tompkins 0-5, C Crowley 1-1, J Cleary 0-3, A Crowley 0-3, D Cahalane 0-1, F Cahalane 0-1. | | D Barrett 0-2, M O'Keeffe 0-1, K Dempsey 0-1. | Referee: J Cummins |

=== Finals ===
| 12 October 1997 Final | Beara | 0-10 - 0-10 | Castlehaven | Páirc Uí Chaoimh, Cork |
| | C O'Sullivan 0-3, R O'Dwyer 0-2, BJ O'Sullivan 0-1, O O'Sullivan 0-1, S Harrington 0-1, M Harrington 0-1, S Spencer 0-1. | | L Tompkins 0-3, M O'Mahony 0-2, J Cleary 0-2, A Crowley 0-1, N Cahalane 0-1, F Cahalane 0-1. | Attendance: 16,007; Referee: N Barrett (Carrigtwohill) |

| 9 November 1997 Final replay | Beara | 1-10 - 1-07 | Castlehaven | Páirc Uí Chaoimh, Cork |
| | S Spencer (1-3, 1 free), C O'Sullivan (0-4, 4 frees), P Hanley (0-1), A O'Regan (0-1), M Harrington (0-1). | | C Crowley (1-1), J Cleary (0-4, 2 frees), F Cahalane (0-1), E Cleary (0-1), | Referee: J Cummins (Glanmworth) |

== Championship statistics ==
=== Top scorers ===
Overall

| Rank | Player | Club | Tally | Total | Matches | Average |
|---|---|---|---|---|---|---|
| 1 | Ciarán O'Sullivan | Beara | 1-24 | 27 | 5 | 5.40 |
| 2 | John Cleary | Castlehaven | 0-25 | 25 | 6 | 4.16 |
| 3 | Dermot O'Sullivan | Duhallow | 1-21 | 24 | 4 | 6.00 |
| 4 | Ronan Sheehan | Mallow | 3-09 | 18 | 2 | 9.00 |
| 4 | Derek Barrett | Cobh | 0-18 | 18 | 5 | 3.60 |
| 6 | Colin Crowley | Castlehaven | 3-06 | 15 | 6 | 2.50 |
| 6 | Larry Tompkins | Castlehaven | 1-12 | 15 | 6 | 2.50 |
| 8 | Séamus Spencer | Beara | 2-08 | 14 | 5 | 2.80 |
| 9 | Noel Twomey | Muskerry | 2-07 | 13 | 3 | 4.33 |
| 9 | Jason Whooley | Carbery | 1-10 | 13 | 2 | 6.50 |

In a single game

| Rank | Player | Club | Tally | Total | Opposition |
|---|---|---|---|---|---|
| 1 | Ronan Sheehan | Mallow | 2-03 | 9 | Aghada |
| 1 | Ronan Sheehan | Mallow | 1-06 | 9 | Imokilly |
| 1 | Ciarán O'Sullivan | Beara | 0-09 | 9 | Clyda Rovers |
| 4 | Noel Twomey | Muskerry | 1-05 | 8 | Bishopstown |
| 4 | Jason Whooley | Carbery | 1-05 | 8 | Imokilly |
| 4 | Dermot O'Sullivan | Duhallow | 0-08 | 8 | Muskerry |
| 7 | Michael Lewis | Aghada | 2-01 | 7 | Mallow |
| 7 | Austin Aherne | Mallow | 2-01 | 7 | Aghada |
| 7 | Dermot O'Sullivan | Duhallow | 0-07 | 7 | Duhallow |
| 7 | Paul McGrath | Bishopstown | 0-07 | 7 | Muskerry |
| 7 | Mark O'Sullivan | UCC | 0-07 | 7 | O'Donovan Rossa |
| 7 | Podsie O'Mahony | Ballincollig | 0-07 | 7 | Duhallow |
| 7 | Derek Barrett | Imokilly | 0-07 | 7 | Dohenys |
