= Michael O'Donovan (Gaelic footballer) =

Irish Gaelic footballer

Personal information
- Native name: Mícheál Ó Donnabháin (Irish)
- Born: 29 May 1976 (age 50) Dunmanway, County Cork, Ireland
- Occupation: Electrician
- Height: 5 ft 9 in (175 cm)

Sport
- Sport: Gaelic Football
- Position: Left corner-back
Club
- Years: Club
- 1995-2010: Dohenys
Club titles
- Cork titles: 0
Inter-county
Years	County	Apps (scores)
1999-2001	Cork	6 (0-00)
Inter-county titles
- Munster titles: 2
- All-Irelands: 0
- NFL: 1
- All Stars: 0

Michael O'Donovan (born 29 May 1976) is an Irish Gaelic football coach and former player. At club level he played with Dohenys and at inter-county level with the Cork senior football team.

== Early life ==
Born and raised in Dunmanway, County Cork, O'Donovan first played Gaelic football as a schoolboy with Coláiste Chairbre. His performances at school level resulted in his selection for the Cork vocational schools' team, and he won an All-Ireland VSFC title after a 0–13 to 0–07 defeat of Donegal in 1994.

== Club career ==
O'Donovan began his club career at juvenile and underage levels with the Dohenys club in Dunmanway. He progressed through the ranks before making his adult debut with the Dohenys intermediate team in 1995. O'Donovan's debut season was a successful one as he claimed a Cork IFC medal after an 0–11 to 0–07 defeat of Kilmurry in the final.

After a decade in the Cork SFC, Dohenys qualified for the 2006 final against Nemo Rangers. O'Donovan kicked a point from centre-back but ended on the losing side after a 1–11 to 0–07 defeat. He brought his club career to an end in 2010.

== Inter-county career ==
O'Donovan first appeared on the inter-county scene with Cork as a member of the junior team in 1996. He won a Munster JFC medal that year after a 1–10 to 1–08 defeat of Kerry in the provincial decider. O'Donovan ended the campaign with an All-Ireland JFC medal after Cork beat Metah by 4–11 to 0–10 in the All-Ireland final. He spent one unsuccessful season with the Cork under-21 team in 1997.

O'Donovan later earned a call-up to the senior team and he made his debut during the 1998–99 National League. He claimed his first silverware with Cork after a defeat of Dublin in the league final. O'Donovan made his Munster SFC debut against Waterford two weeks, but lost his place on the starting fifteen in all subsequent games. He was a non-playing substitute when Cork beat Kerry in the 1999 Munster final. O'Donovan came off the bench as a substitute when Cork suffered a 1–11 to 1–08 defeat by Meath in the 1999 All-Ireland final.

As a peripheral player on the team over the following few years, O'Donovan collected a second Munster SFC winners' medal as a substitute after a defeat of Tipperary in the 2002 Munster final replay. His inter-county career ended shortly afterwards.

== Inter-provincial career ==
O'Donovan's performances at inter-county level resulted in a call-up to the Munster inter-provincial team. He spent two consecutive years with the team, culminating with the winning of a Railway Cup medal in 1999.

== Management career ==
In retirement from playing, O'Donovan became involved as a selector with Dohenys.

== Honours ==
Dohenys

- Cork Intermediate Football Championship: 1995

Cork

- Munster Senior Football Championship: 1999, 2002
- National Football League: 1998–99
- All-Ireland Junior Football Championship: 1996
- Munster Junior Football Championship: 1996

Munster

- Railway Cup: 1999
