= 2017 Cork Premier Intermediate Football Championship =

- Dates: 15 April 2017 – 15 October 2017
- Teams: 16
- Sponsor: Evening Echo
- Champions: Mallow (2nd title); Mattie Taylor (captain); Keith Moynihan (manager)
- Runners-up: St Michael's; John Holly (manager)
- Relegated: Grenagh; Ballinora

Tournament statistics
- Matches played: 30
- Top scorer(s): Daniel Goulding (1-27)

The 2017 Cork Premier Intermediate Football Championship was the 12th staging of the Cork Premier Intermediate Football Championship since its establishment by the Cork County Board in 2006. The draw for the 2017 fixtures took place on 11 December 2016. The championship began on 15 April 2017 and ended on 15 October 2017.

On 15 October 2017, Mallow won the championship following a 1-17 to 1-16 defeat of St Michael's in the final at Páirc Uí Chaoimh. It was their second championship title overall and their first title since 2007.

Éire Óg's Daniel Goulding was the championship's top scorer with 1-27.

== Results ==
=== Round 1 ===
8 April 2017 Round 1	Ballinora	0-14 - 2-11	Castletownbere	Blarney
	M Murphy 0-8, D Holmes 0-4, C Murphy 0-1, P Fitton 0-1.		G Murphy 1-4, R Murphy 1-1, R Dillane 0-3, J Harrington 0-1, T Collins 0-1, A O'Sullivan 0-1.

9 April 2017 Round 1	Éire Óg	2-20 - 3-06	Grenagh	Blarney
	L Sheehan 0-8, D Goulding 0-7, J Cooper 1-1, D Murphy 1-0, D O'Connor 0-2, C O'Mahony 0-1, K Hallissey 0-1.		P Barry-Murphy 1-0, J Russell 1-0, T Walsh 1-0, T Kenny 0-1, C O'Sullivan 0-1, S Bourke 0-1, K O'Neill 0-1, L Walsh 0-1, B O'Neill 0-1.

9 April 2017 Round 1	Fermoy	0-15 - 2-10	Newmarket	Fr. Con Buckley Park
	R O'Hagan 0-8, A O'Connor 0-2, K Morrison 0-2, L Coleman 0-1, M Brennan 0-1, P Clancy 0-1.		D Cullotty 1-5, B Daly 1-0, TJ Brosnan 0-1, B O'Connor 0-1, M Cottrell 0-1, A Browne 0-1, C O'Keeffe 0-1.

15 April 2017 Round 1	Na Piarsaigh	1-07 - 0-14	St Michael's	Páirc Uí Rinn
	A Hogan 0-5, C O'Mahony 1-1, P Gould 0-1.		M Drummond 0-3, P Cronin 0-3, T Deasy 0-3, D Cremin 0-2, L O'Sullivan 0-2, S Holland 0-1.

15 April 2017 Round 1	Bandon	1-10 - 2-15	Béal Átha'n Ghaorthaidh	Cloughduv
	M Sugrue 0-5, A Murphy 1-1, B Collins 0-2, D Crowley 0-1, M Cahalane 0-1.		A Ó Coinceannáin 1-5, C Ó Duinnín 1-1, B Seartan 0-3, D Seartan 0-2, L Seartan 0-1, L Ó Conchúir 0-1, M Ó Riordáin 0-1, C Ó Loingsigh 0-1.

23 April 2017 Round 1	nemo Rangers	0-12 - 2-18	Mallow	Blarney
	A Greaney 0-3, B Twomey 0-3, R Kennedy 0-2, C Horgan 0-2, J O'Donovan 0-1, J Philpott 0-1.		P Herlihy 2-3, J Loughrey 0-5, C O'Riordan 0-4, K O'Connor 0-4, C Stanton 0-1, M Taylor 0-1.

29 April 2017 Round 1	Bantry Blues	1-07 - 0-07	St. Vincent's	St. Mary's Park
	R O'Mahony 1-0, T Foley 0-3, G Johnson 0-1, A Coakley 0-1, D Daly 0-1, K Coakley 0-1.		JP Murphy 0-5, P O'Sullivan 0-1, G Kelleher 0-1.

30 April 2017 Round 1	Macroom	0-15 - 0-14 (aet)	Naomh Abán	Cill na Martra
	A Quinn 0-4, F Goold 0-4, S Kiely 0-2, P Lucey 0-2, D Cotter 0-1, D Horgan 0-1, D Goold 0-1.		D Ó Ceallaigh 0-3, M Ó Cróinín 0-3, Colm Ó Murchú 0-3, D Ó Ceocháin 0-2, M Ó Laoire 0-1, S Ó Laoire 0-1, M Ó Liatháin 0-1.

=== Round 2A ===
28 May 2017 Round 2A	Macroom	0-10 - 1-14	Newmarket	Duggan Park
	P Lucey 0-7, A Quinn 0-1, D Cotter 0-1, D Goold 0-1.		K O'Sullivan 1-1, D Culloty 0-3, B O'Connor 0-3, TJ Brosnan 0-2, R O'Keeffe 0-2, D Hannon 0-1, M Cottrell 0-1, C O'Keeffe 0-1.

11 June 2017 Round 2A	St Michael's	0-12 - 0-09	Éire Óg	Brinny Sportsfield
	P Cronin 0-5, E Buckley 0-4, E Hegarty 0-2, L O'Sullivan 0-1.		D Goulding 0-6, L Sheehan 0-1, C O'Callaghan 0-1, P McDonagh 0-1.

17 June 2017 Round 2A	Bantry Blues	3-14 - 1-11	Castletownbere	Adrigole
	R Deane 1-3, G Johnson 1-2, T Foley 1-1, S Coughlan 0-2, A Coakley 0-1, N Canty 0-1, D Daly 0-1, K Coakley 0-1, J O'Neill 0-1, S Keevers 0-1.		A O'Sullivan 1-0, R Murphy 0-3, G Murphy 0-3, D Fenton 0-3, R Dillane 0-1, L Hanley 0-1.

30 July 2017 Round 2A	Béal Átha'n Ghaorthaidh	0-11 - 1-12	Mallow	Blarney
	A Concannon 0-5, C Lynch 0-2, B Shorten 0-2, L O'Connor 0-1, E Dineen 0-1.		P Herlihy 1-2, C O'Riordan 0-4, K O'Sullivan 0-3, K O'Connor 0-2, R Harkin 0-1.

=== Round 2B ===
11 June 2017 Round 2B	St. Vincent's	1-13 - 1-04	Ballinora	Blarney
	G Kelleher 1-4, P O'Sullivan 0-3, JP Murphy 0-2, S Buckley 0-2, D Duggan 0-1, G McCarthy 0-1.		M Murphy 1-1, D Buckley 0-1, A O'Neill 0-1, D Holmes 0-1.

11 June 2017 Round 2B	Na Piarsaigh	1-20 - 2-10 (aet)	Grenagh	Blarney
	K Buckley 0-8, E Gunning 1-0, G Joyce 0-3, C O'Mahony 0-3, S Forde 0-3, E Sheehan 0-1, P Guest 0-1, P Gould 0-1.		DD Dorgan 0-8, J Russell 1-0, P Barry-Murphy 1-0, G Russell 0-1, C O'Sullivan 0-1.

15 July 2017 Round 2B	Bandon	2-11 - 0-13	Nemo Rangers	Cloughduv
	A Johnson 1-1, B Collins 1-0, J Mulcahy 0-2, M McNamara 0-2, D Crowley 0-2, M Sugrue 0-2, A Murphy 0-1, C O'Mahony 0-1.		W Morgan 0-4, K O'Donovan 0-4, S Walsh 0-3, C O'Donovan 0-1, E Dilloughrey 0-1.

29 July 2017 Round 2B	Naomh Abán	1-12 - 2-14	Fermoy	Páirc Liam Mhic Cárthaigh
	M Ó Cróinín 1-3, D Ó Ceallaigh 0-4, C Ó Murchú 0-3, M Ó Duinnín 0-1, D Ó Laoire 0-1.		R O'Hagan 0-6, K Morrison 1-2, M Brennan 1-1, A O'Connor 0-2, J Daly 0-1, T Clancy 0-1, R O'Callaghan 0-1.

=== Relegation playoffs ===
17 September 2017 Playoff	Grenagh	0-08 - 1-12	Naomh Abán	Castle Grounds
	T Kenny 0-7, J Russell 0-1.		M Ó Duinnín 0-4, N Ó Ceallaigh 1-0, D Ó Ceallaigh 0-3, D hAilín 0-2, T Ó Riordáin 0-1, D Ó Laoire 0-1, M Ó Laoire 0-1.

25 September 2017 Playoff	Ballinora	1-06 - 1-21	Nemo Rangers	Ovens
	B Ahern 1-1, D Holmes 0-2, J Lordan 0-1, M Murphy 0-1, D Corkery 0-1.		R Kennedy 0-8, W Morgan 0-4, B Cripps 1-0, P Gallogly 0-3, A Greaney 0-2, C O'Donovan 0-2, E Dilloughrey 0-1, S Walsh 0-1.

=== Round 3 ===
19 August 2017 Round 3	Éire Óg	1-16 - 2-05	Na Piarsaigh	Páirc Uí Rinn
	D Goulding 0-7, C O'Callaghan 1-2, R O'Toole 0-3, D O'Connor 0-2, E O'Shea 0-1, L Sheehan 0-1.		A Hogan 1-2, S Forde 1-0, K Buckley 0-2, C Buckley 0-1.

19 August 2017 Round 3	Béal Átha'n Ghaorthaidh	0-20 - 1-09	Fermoy	Cullen Sportsfield
	B Seartan 0-8, A Ó Coinceannáin 0-2, C Ó Loingsigh 0-2, L Ó Conchúir 0-2, L Seartan 0-2, D Seartan 0-2, D Thompson 0-2.		R O'Hagan 0-4, P Murphy 1-0, R O'Callaghan 0-1, J Hutchings 0-1, M Brennan 0-1, L Coleman 0-1, R McEvoy 0-1.

19 August 2017 Round 3	Macroom	0-16 - 1-05	St. Vincent's	Coachford
	D Goold 0-5, C O'Sullivan 0-2, D Horgan 0-2, S Kiely 0-2, D Cotter 0-2, E O'Gorman 0-1, A Quinn 0-1, M Corrigan 0-1.		J Kelleher 1-2, A Buckley 0-1, S Duggan 0-1, D Lockyer 0-1.

26 August 2017 Round 3	Bandon	6-13 - 0-09	Castletownbere	St Colum's Sportsfield
	M Sugrue 1-5, M McNamara 2-0, J Mulcahy 1-2, B Collins 1-1, A Murphy 1-1, D Crowley 0-3, R Crowley 0-1.		D Fenton 0-7, J Harrington 0-1, A O'Sullivan 0-1.

=== Quarter-finals ===
2 September 2017 Quarter-final	Macroom	1-09 - 2-11	Newmarket	Dromtarriffe GAA Grounds
	D Horgan 1-2, F Goold 0-4, D Goold 0-2, T Dineen 0-1.		C O'Keeffe 2-3, B O'Connor 0-3, TJ Brosnan 0-2, K O'Sullivan 0-1, D Hannon 0-1, R O'Keeffe 0-1.

2 September 2017 Quarter-final	Bantry Blues	1-04 - 1-09	Bandon	Ballinacarriga Sportsfield
	S McSweeney 1-0, S Coughlan 0-1, D Daly 0-1, S O'Neill 0-1, A Coakley 0-1.		M Sugrue 0-4, D Crowley 1-0, C O'Mahony 0-2, J Mulcahy 0-1, M McNamara 0-1, A Murphy 0-1.

2 September 2017 Quarter-final	Béal Átha'n Ghaorthaidh	0-09 - 2-12	Mallow	Coachford
	A Concannon 0-4, B Shorten 0-3, D Shorten 0-2.		J Loughrey 1-1, D Breen 1-0, M Taylor 0-2, K O'Connor 0-2, C O'Riordan 0-2, A Cashman 0-1, K O'Sullivan 0-1, P Herlihy 0-1, K Sheehan 0-1, C Lynch 0-1.

2 September 2017 Quarter-final	Éire Óg	1-12 - 2-09	St Michael's	Páirc Uí Rinn
	D Goulding 1-6, C O'Callaghan 0-2, R O'Toole 0-1, J Dineen 0-1, C O'Mahony 0-1, L Sheehan 0-1.		S O'Keeffe 1-1, E Hegarty 1-1, L O'Sullivan 0-3, P Cronin 0-2, K Hegarty 0-1, D Cremin 0-1.

16 September 2017 Quarter-final replay	Éire Óg	0-08 - 2-15	St Michael's	Carrigaline
	E O'Shea 0-3, J Dineen 0-3, D Goulding 0-1, L Sheehan 0-1.		P Cronin 0-6, E Buckley 1-2, L O'Sullivan 1-2, E Hegarty 0-2, A Murphy 0-1, S O'Keeffe 0-1, T Deasy 0-1.

=== Semi-finals ===
30 September 2017 Semi-final	Newmarket	1-12 - 2-16	St Michael's	Mourne Abbey
	C O'Keeffe 1-7 (0-4f), D Culloty 0-2 (1f), M Cottrell 0-1; D Hannon 0-1; B O'Connor 0-1.	Report	E Hegarty 0-8 (6f), P Cronin 1-4 (0-2f), D Cremin 1-0, L O'Sullivan 0-3, N Cashman 0-1.

30 September 2017 Semi-final	Bandon	1-06 - 0-16	Mallow	Coachford
	D Crowley 1-2, J Mulcahy 0-2, M Sugrue 0-1, A Johnson 0-1.		R Harkin 0-4, C O'Riordan 0-4, K Sheehan 0-3, K O'Sullivan 0-2, P Herlihy 0-2, M Taylor 0-1.

=== Final ===
15 October 2017 Final	Mallow	1-17 - 1-16	St Michael's	Páirc Uí Chaoimh, Cork
	C O’Riordan (0-7, 0-3 frees), A Sheehan (1-0), M Taylor, J Loughrey and K O’Sullivan (0-1 free) and (0-2 each), M Quirke, C Stokes, R Harkin and P Herlihy (0-1 each).	Report	P Cronin (0-6, 0-5 frees), S O’Keeffe (1-0), E Hegarty (0-3, 0-1 free), N Cashman and L O’Sullivan (0-2 each), D Meaney, K Hegarty and D Cremin (0-1 each).	Referee: D Murnane (Macroom)

== Championship statistics ==
=== Top scorers ===
Overall

Rank	Player	Club	Tally	Total	Matches	Average
1	Daniel Goulding	Éire Óg	1-27	30	5	6.00
2	Paul Cronin	St Michael's	1-26	29	6	4.83
3	Conor O'Keeffe	Newmarket	3-12	21	4	5.25
3	Cian O'Riordan	Mallow	0-21	21	4	4.20
4	Mark Sugrue	Bandon	1-17	20	5	4.00
5	Aindreas Ó Coinceannáin	Béal Átha'n Ghaorthaidh	1-16	19	4	4.75
5	Eric Hegarty	St Michael's	1-16	19	5	3.80
6	Pa Herlihy	Mallow	3-09	18	5	3.60
6	Ruairí O'Hagan	Fermoy	0-18	18	3	6.00
7	Ben Seartan	Béal Átha'n Ghaorthaidh	0-16	16	4	4.00

In a single game

Rank	Player	Club	Tally	Total	Opposition
1	Conor O'Keeffe	Newmarket	1-07	10	St Michael's
2	Pa Herlihy	Mallow	2-03	9	Nemo Rangers
2	Conor O'Keeffe	Newmarket	2-03	9	Macroom
2	Daniel Goulding	Éire Óg	1-06	9	St Michael's
3	Daniel Culloty	Newmarket	1-05	8	Fermoy
3	Aindreas Ó Coinceannáin	Béal Átha'n Ghaorthaidh	1-05	8	Bandon
3	Mark Sugrue	Bandon	1-05	8	Castletownbere
3	Michael Murphy	Ballinora	0-08	8	Castletownbere
3	Liam Sheehan	Éire Óg	0-08	8	Grenagh
3	Ruairí O'Hagan	Fermoy	0-08	8	Newmarket
3	Keith Buckley	Na Piarsaigh	0-08	8	Grenagh
3	D. D. Dorgan	Grenagh	0-08	8	Na Piarsaigh
3	Ryan Kennedy	Nemo Rangers	0-08	8	Ballinora
3	Ben Seartan	Béal Átha'n Ghaorthaidh	0-08	8	Fermoy
3	Eric Hegarty	St Michael's	0-08	8	Newmarket
