= 1993 Cork Junior A Football Championship =

- Dates: 3 October – 14 November 1993
- Teams: 8
- Champions: Dohenys (3rd title); Kieran Farr (captain)
- Runners-up: Carrigtwohill

Tournament statistics
- Matches played: 7
- Goals scored: 9 (1.29 per match)
- Points scored: 133 (19 per match)

The 1993 Cork Junior A Football Championship was the 95th staging of the Cork Junior A Football Championship since its establishment by Cork County Board in 1895. The championship ran from 3 October to 14 November 1993.

The final was played on 14 November 1993 at the Éire Óg Grounds in Ovens, between Dohenys and Carrigtwohill, in what was their first ever meeting in the final. Dohenys won the match by 1–10 to 0–06 to claim their third championship title overall and a first title in 27 years.

== Qualification ==
Division	Championship	Champions
Avondhu	North Cork Junior A Football Championship	Fermoy
Beara	Beara Junior A Football Championship	Adrigole
Carbery	South West Junior A Football Championship	Dohenys
Carrigdhoun	South East Junior A Football Championship	Valley Rovers
Duhallow	Duhallow Junior A Football Championship	Newmarket
Imokilly	East Cork Junior A Football Championship	Carrigtwohill
Muskerry	Mid Cork Junior A Football Championship	Grenagh
Seandún	City Junior A Football Championship	Passage

== Results ==
=== Quarter-finals ===
3 October 1993 Quarter-final	Valley Rovers	3–07 – 1–06	Fermoy	Glenville Grounds

3 October 1993 Quarter-final	Carrigtwohill	2–12 – 0–08	Adrigole	Páirc Naomh Eoin

17 October 1993 Quarter-final	Newmarket	0–13 – 0–06	Passage	Mourneabbey Grounds

31 October 1993 Quarter-final	Dohensy	0–15 – 0–07	Grenagh	Kilmurry Grounds

=== Semi-finals ===
31 October 1993 Semi-final	Carrigtwohill	0–12 – 0–08	Valley Rovers	Douglas Grounds

7 November 1993 Semi-final	Dohenys	1–13 – 1–10	Newmarket	Carrigadrohid Grounds

=== Final ===
14 November 1993 Final	Dohenys	1–10 – 0–06	Carrigtwohill	Ovens Grounds
