= 2007 Cork Premier Intermediate Football Championship =

- Dates: 7 April 2007 – 20 October 2007
- Teams: 14
- Sponsor: Evening Echo
- Champions: Mallow (1st title); Clive Kerrisk (captain); Ronan Sheehan (manager)
- Runners-up: Killavullen; Liam Dorgan (captain); Éamonn Coakley (manager); Aidan Dorgan (manager)

Tournament statistics
- Matches played: 23
- Goals scored: 31 (1.35 per match)
- Points scored: 405 (17.61 per match)
- Top scorer(s): James Murphy (0-21)

The 2007 Cork Premier Intermediate Football Championship was the second staging of the Cork Premier Intermediate Football Championship since its establishment by the Cork County Board in 2006. The draw for the opening round fixtures took place on 10 December 2006. The championship began on 7 April 2007 and ended on 20 October 2007.

St. Vincent's left the championship after securing promotion to senior level. Béal Átha'n Ghaorthaidh, Mallow and St. Michael's joined the championship.

The final, a North Cork derby, was played on 20 October 2007 at Páirc Uí Rinn in Cork, between Mallow and Killavullen. Mallow won the match by 1-07 to 0-07 to claim their first championship title in the grade and a first title in any football grade since 1992. It was their first ever championship title in the grade.

Glanmire's James Murphy was the championship's top scorer with 0-21.

== Team changes ==
=== To Championship ===
Promoted from the Cork Intermediate Football Championship

- Béal Átha'n Ghaorthaidh

Relegated from the Cork Senior Football Championship

- Mallow
- St. Michael's

=== From Championship ===
Promoted to the Cork Senior Football Championship

- St. Vincent's

== Results ==
=== Round 1 ===
7 April 2007 Round 1	St. Michael's	0-09 - 1-08	Ballinora	Ballincollig
	E Hegarty 0-5, F Barry 0-1, D Gosnell 0-1, S O'Sullivan 0-1, M Drummond 0-1.		J Fitton 1-0, E Lougheed 0-2, A O'Neill 0-2, M Murphy 0-1, G O'Halloran 0-1, M Hodge 0-1, C O'Shea 0-1.

8 April 2007 Round 1	Killavullen	0-12 - 0-09	Newmarket	Dr. Mannix Sportsfield
	L Dorgan 0-5, A O'Driscoll 0-2, J O'Neill 0-2, D Hartnett 0-1, D Relihan 0-1, B O'Driscoll 0-1.		SF O'Connor 0-6, D O'Brien 0-2, TJ Bodie 0-1.

8 April 2007 Round 1	Nemo Rangers	0-10 - 1-08	Kiskeam	Páirc Eoin Mhic Charthaigh
	J Kavanagh 0-4, M Kearney 0-2, J Kerins 0-2, D Kearney 0-2.		D Scannell 1-1, N Cronin 0-4, B Dennehy 0-2, S Linehan 0-1.

8 April 2007 Round 1	Béal Átha'n Ghaorthaidh	0-05 - 1-05	Glenville	Páirc Eoin Mhic Charthaigh
	A Ó Coinceannáin 0-2, B Ó Coinceannáin 0-1, G Ó hIarlatha 0-1, L Seartan 0-1.		D McCarthy 1-1, P Cahill 0-2, S O'Leary 0-1, B Healy 0-1.

8 April 2007 Round 1	Mayfield	1-08 - 0-10	Youghal	Ballinacurra
	P Condon 0-5, R Scannell 1-0, D Lucey 0-1, B Hegarty 0-1, E Crowley 0-1.		L Desmond 0-5, J Ormond 0-2, E Fox 0-1, E Coleman 0-1, K Dempsey 0-1.

11 April 2007 Round 1	Glanmire	0-04 - 1-10	Clyda Rovers	Páirc Uí Rinn
	J Murphy 0-3, D O'Connell 0-1.		D O'Brien 1-3, D O'Shea 0-2, J Murphy 0-2, C O'Sullivan 0-2, P Kissane 0-1.

12 April 2007 Round 1	Mallow	0-08 - 1-11	Newcestown	Coachford
	J O'Sullivan 0-4, P Dineen 0-2, P O'Riordan 0-1, J Hayes 0-1.		H Curran 1-3, C Keane 0-6, T Ryan 0-2.

=== Round 2 ===
26 May 2007 Round 2	St. Michael's	0-07 - 2-09	Mallow	Páirc Mac Gearailt
	M Mulconry 0-5, R Beechinor 0-1, S O'Sullivan 0-1.		J Hayes 1-3, C O'Riordan 0-4, S Cronin 1-0, P Dineen 0-1, M O'Brien 0-1.

2 June 2007 Round 2	Nemo Rangers	1-13 - 0-04	Youghal	Clonmult Memorial Park
	J Kavanagh 1-3, J Kerins 0-4, M Daly 0-2, D Kearney 0-1, M Kearney 0-1, R Kenny 0-1, JP O'Neill 0-1.		G O'Leary 0-2, B Coleman 0-1, L Desmond 0-1.

20 June 2007 Round 2	Newmarket	3-05 - 1-15	Glanmire	Dr. Croke Park
	SF Cronin 2-2, J McCarthy 1-0, C O'Sullivan 0-1, TJ Bodie 0-1, B O'Leary 0-1.		J Murphy 0-9, M Cussen 1-0, M Hopkins 0-1, P Heaney 0-1, R Ryan 0-1, B Kirby 0-1, K Mulvihill 0-1, K Murphy 0-1.

- Béal Átha'n Ghaorthaidh received a bye

=== Round 3 ===
16 June 2007 Round 3	Newcestown	1-06 - 1-09	Killavullen	Páirc Eoin Mhic Charthaigh
	P Condon 1-1, H Curtin 0-3, T Ryan 0-2.		L Dorgan 0-6, A O'Driscoll 1-0, J O'Neill 0-3.

23 June 2007 Round 3	Béal Átha'n Ghaorthaidh	2-12 - 1-15 (aet)	Kiskeam	Castle Grounds
	A Ó Coinceannáin 1-5, P Ó Buachalla 1-0, L Ó Conchúir 0-2, L Seartan 0-2, C Ó Tuama 0-1, E Ó Coill 0-1, P Ó Coinceannáin 0-1.		N Cronin 1-5, D Herlihy 0-3, D Fitzgerald 0-2, B Dennehy 0-2, M Herlihy 0-1, S Linehan 0-1, C Noonan 0-1.

23 June 2007 Round 3	Clyda Rovers	0-13 - 1-10	Ballinora	Páirc Eoin Mhic Charthaigh
	D O'Shea 0-4, J Murphy 0-3, J Walsh 0-2, P Kissane 0-1, D Cahill 0-1, F O'Shea 0-1, F Dorgan 0-1.		G O'Halloran 1-1, C Brosnan 0-4, B Ahern 0-2, E Lougheed 0-1, M Hurley 0-1, M Murphy 0-1.

30 June 2007 Round 3 replay	Béal Átha'n Ghaorthaidh	2-08 - 1-04	Kiskeam	Castle Grounds
	L Ó Conchúir 1-1, C Ó Tuama 1-0, A Ó Coinceannáin 0-3, L Seartan 0-3, P Ó Coinceannáin 0-1.		B Dennehy 1-2, M Herlihy 0-1, N Cronin 0-1.

7 July 2007 Round 3 replay	Clyda Rovers	1-08 - 1-12	Ballinora	Páirc Eoin Mhic Charthaigh
	F O'Shea 1-0, D O'Shea 0-3, J Murphy 0-2, F Dorgan 0-1, N O'Mullane 0-1, C O'Sullivan 0-1.		M Murphy 1-3, C Brosnan 0-5, B Ahern 0-2, M Hurley 0-1, N Meagan 0-1.

=== Quarter-finals ===
14 July 2007 Quarter-final	Killavullen	0-10 - 0-10	Ballinora	Páirc Eoin Mhic Charthaigh
	D Dorgan 0-3, L Dorgan 0-2, A O'Driscoll 0-2, J O'Neill 0-2, D Relihan 0-1.		C Brosnan 0-5, B Ahern 0-2, C O'Shea 0-2, M Murphy 0-1.

15 July 2007 Quarter-final	Béal Átha'n Ghaorthaidh	0-13 - 2-08	Nemo Rangers	Ovens
	A Ó Coinceannáin 0-4, P Ó Buachalla 0-3, L Seartan 0-2, C Ó Tuama 0-2, L Ó Conchúir 0-1, E Ó Coill 0-1.		S Marshall 1-1, B O'Driscoll 0-4, J Kavanagh 1-0, M Dorgan 0-1, M Daly 0-1, A Hogan 0-1.

15 July 2007 Quarter-final	Mallow	1-08 - 0-08	Mayfield	Páirc Eoin Mhic Charthaigh
	C O'Riordan 1-3, P Dineen 0-3, J O'Sullivan 0-1, J Hayes 0-1.		P Condon 0-2, E Crowley 0-2, T Lotty 0-2, M Barry 0-1, D Lucey 0-1.

25 July 2007 Quarter-final	Killavullen	1-11 - 0-09	Ballinora	Páirc Eoin Mhic Charthaigh
	J O'Neill 1-1, D Dorgan 0-3, P Hartnett 0-1, A O'Driscoll 0-1, L Dorgan 0-1, D Hartnett 0-1, D Relihan 0-1, B O'Driscoll 0-1, I O'Gorman 0-1.		C Brosnan 0-3, B Ahern 0-3, E Lougheed 0-2, M Hodge 0-1.

30 September 2007 Quarter-final	Glenville	0-06 - 0-10	Glanmire	Erin's Own Grounds
	J Halbert 0-3, P Cahill 0-2, S O'Leary 0-1.		J Murphy 0-5, F O'Reilly 0-3, M Cussen 0-1, B O'Callaghan 0-1.

=== Semi-finals ===
18 August 2007 Semi-final	Mallow	0-10 - 1-06	Nemo Rangers	Blarney
	C O'Riordan 0-6, J Hayes 0-2, P O'Riordan 0-1, P Dineen 0-1.		JP O'Neill 1-1, S Marsahll 0-2, L O'Sullivan 0-1, M Dorgan 0-1, J Kavanagh 0-1.

13 October 2007 Semi-final	Killavullen	1-08 - 0-07	Glanmire	Bride Rovers Park
	D Hartnett 1-0, D Dorgan 0-2, P Hartnett 0-2, J O'Neill 0-2, I O'Driscoll 0-1, A O'Driscoll 0-1.		J Murphy 0-4, B Murphy 0-1, B O'Callaghan 0-1, M Hopkins 0-1.

=== Final ===
20 October 2007 Final	Mallow	1-07 - 0-07	Killavullen	Páirc Uí Rinn
	C O'Riordan 0-4, J O'Sullivan 1-0, P Dineen 0-1, M O'Brien 0-1, M Buckley 0-1.		L Dorgan 0-3, A O'Driscoll 0-2, D Dorgan 0-1, I O'Driscoll 0-1.

== Championship statistics ==
=== Top scorers ===
Overall

Rank	Player	Club	Tally	Total	Matches	Average
1	James Murphy	Glanmire	0-21	21	4	5.25
2	Cian O'Riordan	Mallow	1-17	20	4	5.00
3	Aindrias Ó Coinceannáin	Béal Átha'n Ghaorthaidh	1-14	17	4	4.25
3	Conor Brosnan	Ballinora	0-17	17	5	3.40
3	Liam Dorgan	Killavullen	0-17	17	6	2.83
4	Joe Kavanagh	Nemo Rangers	2-08	14	4	3.50
4	Seán Francis O'Connor	Newmarket	2-08	14	2	7.00
5	Niall Cronin	Kiskeam	1-10	13	3	4.33
6	Alan O'Driscoll	Killavullen	1-08	11	6	1.83
7	Joe Hayes	Mallow	1-07	10	5	2.00

In a single game

Rank	Player	Club	Tally	Total	Opposition
1	James Murphy	Glanmire	0-09	9	Newmarket
2	Seán Francis O'Connor	Newmarket	2-02	8	Glanmire
2	Aindrias Ó Coinceannáin	Béal Átha'n Ghaorthaidh	1-05	8	Kiskeam
2	Niall Cronin	Kiskeam	1-05	8	Béal Átha'n Ghaorthaidh
3	Derek O'Brien	Clyda Rovers	1-03	6	Glanmire
3	Hugh Curran	Newcestown	1-03	6	Mallow
3	Joe Hayes	Mallow	1-03	6	St. Michael's
3	Joe Kavanagh	Nemo Rangers	1-03	6	Youghal
3	Michael Murphy	Ballinora	1-03	6	Clyda Rovers
3	Cian O'Riordan	Mallow	1-03	6	Mayfield
3	Seán Francis O'Connor	Newmarket	0-06	6	Killavullen
3	Carthach Keane	Newcestown	0-06	6	Mallow
3	Liam Dorgan	Killavullen	0-06	6	Newcestown
3	Cian O'Riordan	Mallow	0-06	6	Nemo Rangers
