= 1970 Cork Junior Football Championship =

- Dates: 11 October – 13 December 1970
- Teams: 8
- Champions: Newmarket (1st title); Billy Daly (captain)
- Runners-up: Adrigole; Kevin Jer O'Sullivan (captain)

Tournament statistics
- Matches played: 8
- Goals scored: 20 (2.5 per match)
- Points scored: 118 (14.75 per match)
- Top scorer(s): Michael O'Regan (1–24)

The 1970 Cork Junior Football Championship was the 72nd staging of the Cork Junior A Football Championship since its establishment by Cork County Board in 1895. The championship ran from 11 October to 13 December 1970.

The final was played on 13 December 1970 at the Castle Grounds in Macroom, between Newmarket and Adrigole, in what was their first ever meeting in the final. Newmarket won the match by 1–09 to 2–04 to claim their first ever championship title.

Adrigole's Michael O'Regan was the championship's top scorer with 1–24.

== Qualification ==
Division	Championship	Champions
Avondhu	North Cork Junior A Football Championship	Grange
Beara	Beara Junior A Football Championship	Adrigole
Carbery	South West Junior A Football Championship	Bandon
Carrigdhoun	South East Junior A Football Championship	Valley Rovers
Duhallow	Duhallow Junior A Football Championship	Newmarket
Imokilly	East Cork Junior A Football Championship	Midleton
Muskerry	Mid Cork Junior A Football Championship	Naomh Abán
Seandún	City Junior A Football Championship	Douglas

== Results ==
=== Quarter-finals ===
11 October 1970 Quarter-final	Newmarket	1–11 – 0–05	Valley Rovers	Coachford Sportsfield
	B Eardley 1-2, D Daly 0-4, N Collins 0-2, M Flanagan 0-1, TD Cronin 0-1, D Burke 0-1.		J Fitzgerald 0-3, D Fitzgerald 0-1, L Hickey 0-1.

25 October 1970 Quarter-final	Douglas	1–12 – 1–08	Grange	Riverstown Sportsfield
	T Connell 1-2, B Larkin 0-4, T Leary 0-3, N Flynn 0-2, A Stuart 0-1.		N Kirby 0-4, B Clifford 1-0, W Hanrahan 0-2, D Fenton 0-2.

1 November 1970 Quarter-final	Bandon	1–13 – 1–08	Naomh Abán	Cloughduv Grounds
	N Crowley 1-3, A Smith 0-5, F Crowley 0-2, J Brennan 0-2, J Gabriel 0-1.		S Mullane 0-5, S Lucey 1-0, D Scannell 0-2, C Twomey 0-1.

8 November 1970 Quarter-final	Adrigole	2–13 – 3–03	Midleton	Ballingeary Grounds
	M O'Regan 1-12, M O'Neill 1-1.		P McCarthy 1-0, W Glavin 1-0, P O'Sullivan 1-0, J Cosgrave 0-2, T Cotter 0-1.

=== Semi-finals ===
8 November 1970 Semi-final	Newmarket	2–06 – 1–08	Douglas	Coachford Sportsfield
	B Eardley 1-2, TD Cronin 1-1, B Daly 0-3.		B Larkin 1-4, C Kavanagh 0-2, T McCarthy 0-1, P Coughlan 0-1.

22 November 1970 Semi-final	Adrigole	1–08 – 3–02	Bandon	Sam Maguire Park
	M Regan 0-5, T O'Neill 1-0, KJ O'Sullivan 0-2, J O'Neill 0-1.		D Crowley 1-2, F Crowley 1-0, J Brennan 1-0.

6 December 1970 Semi-final replay	Adrigole	0–05 – 0–03	Bandon	Rossa Park
	M O'Regan 0-4, N O'Sullivan 0-1.		P Smith 0-2, N Crowley 0-1.

=== Final ===
13 December 1970 Final	Newmarket	1–09 – 2–04	Adrigole	Castle Grounds
	B Eardley 0-6, TD Cronin 1-1, D O'Gorman 0-1, B Daly 0-1.		J O'Sullivan 2-1, M O'Regan 0-3.	Referee: J Dennigan (Fermoy)

== Championship statistics ==
=== Top scorers ===
Rank	Player	Club	Tally	Total	Matches	Average
1	Michael O'Regan	Adrigole	1-24	27	4	6.75
2	Ben Eardley	Newmarket	2-10	16	3	5.33
3	Brendan Larkin	Douglas	1-08	11	2	5.50
