= 1995 Cork Intermediate Football Championship =

Gaelic football competition

- Dates: 14 May - 10 September 1995
- Teams: 22
- Champions: Dohenys (2nd title); Paudie Murray (captain); Ray Kelleher (manager)
- Runners-up: Kilmurry

Tournament statistics
- Matches played: 24
- Goals scored: 39 (1.63 per match)
- Points scored: 444 (18.5 per match)
- Top scorer(s): Denis Moss (1-22)

The 1995 Cork Intermediate Football Championship was the 60th staging of the Cork Intermediate Football Championship since its establishment by the Cork County Board in 1909. The draw for the opening round fixtures took place on 11 December 1994. The championship ran from 14 May to 10 September 1995.

The final was played on 10 September 1995 at Charlie Hurley Park in Bandon, between Dohenys and Kilmurry, in what was their first ever meeting in a final. Dohenys won the match by 0–11 to 0–07 to claim their second championship title overall and a first title in 23 years.

Kilmurry's Denis Moss was the championship's Ztop scorer with 1-22.

== Results ==
=== First round ===
14 May 1995 First round	Delaneys	2-11 - 0-09	Carrigaline	Páirc Liam Mhic Cárthaigh
	K Egan 1-4, D Power 1-2, D McElhinney 0-1, P McCarthy 0-1, D Quinlan 0-1, G Healy 0-1, B Egan 0-1.		A Murphy 0-5, S Stack 0-1, P Healy 0-1, O Conlon 0-1, C O'Herlihy 0-1.

14 May 1995 First round	Newcestown	0-07 - 0-06	St. Finbarr's	Páic Liam Mhic Cárthaigh
	P Condon 0-6, S O'Donovan 0-1.		B Hurley 0-2, T Leahy 0-2, A O'Shea 0-1, R Lehane 0-1.

14 May 1995 First round	Urhan	1-08 - 1-08	Nemo Rangers	Brinny sportsfield
	C O'Sullivan 0-7, S O'Shea 1-0. T O'Sullivan 0-1.		G Murphy 1-0, E Dillon 0-3, N Corkery 0-2, D Lenihan 0-1, T Dalton 0-1, D Creedon 0-1.

14 May 1995 First round	Cobh	1-03 - 5-09	Kilmurry	Páirc Uí Rinn
	R Meaney 1-1, M Daly 0-1, D Barrett 0-1.		J Fleming 2-0, T Murphy 2-0, TJ O'Leary 1-1, Denis Moss 0-4, J Clifford 0-2, E Burke 0-1, J O'Leary 0-1.

20 May 1995 First round	Bishopstown	1-05 - 0-07	Millstreet	Castle Grounds
	J Galvin 1-1, J Ryan 0-2, B Healy 0-1, D Fleming 0-1.		T O'Connor 0-2, J O'Sullivan 0-1, W O'Leary 0-1, C Cotter 0-1, L Dennehy 0-1, D Twomey 0-1.

4 June 1995 First round replay	Urhan	0-12 - 0-14	Nemo Rangers	Sam Maguire Park
	C O'Sullivan 0-6, B O'Dwyer 0-2, O O'Sullivan 0-2, D Hanley 0-1, T O'Sullivan 0-1.		P Lambert 0-5, E Fitzgerald 0-3, D O'Sullivan 0-2, E Dillon 0-1, D Linehan 0-1, S Fahy 0-1, E O'Leary 0-1.

24 June 1995 First round	St. Michael's	1-11 - 2-07	Knocknagree	Kilmurry Grounds
	J O'Flynn 1-3, A Ryan 0-4, T Scally 0-2, A Browne 0-1, T Cashman 0-1.		N O'Connor 1-2, M Casey 1-0, A Cronin 0-2, J Buckley 0-2, S Walsh 0-1.

=== Second round ===
13 May 1995 Second round	Naomh Abán	0-09 - 2-08	Dohenys	Inchigeelagh Grounds
	J McCarthy 0-5, M Cronin 0-1, S Cronin 0-1, G Lynch 0-1, D Healy 0-1.		Barry Herlihy 1-2, K Murray 1-1, C Crowley 0-4, M Farr 0-1.

14 May 1995 Second round	Douglas	0-09 - 2-14	Erin's Own	Páirc Uí Rinn
	R McCarthy 0-3, R Geary 0-2, D Larkin 0-2, M O'Connor 0-1, D O'Donovan 0-1.		Tony O'Keeffe 2-3, J Corcoran 0-6, P McNamara 0-2, M Mulcahy 0-2, C Dillon 0-1.

14 May 1995 Second round	Clyda Rovers	1-10 - 1-07	Macroom	Páirc Eoin Mhic Cárthaigh
	T McGlinchey 1-1, R Walsh 0-4, C O'Sullivan 0-3, F Dorgan 0-2.		J Neville 0-5, N Twomey 1-1, D Murray 0-1.

14 May 1995 Second round	Castletownbere	0-13 - 0-11	St. Vincent's	Sam Maguire Park
	D Healy 0-6, S Spencer 0-3, C Collins 0-1, M O'Sullivan 0-1, J Power 0-1, Noel Murphy 0-1.		A Elliot 0-4, G Cooney 0-2, R O'Shea 0-1, D O'Callaghan 0-1, L Harte 0-1, K O'Connor 0-1, J Canniffe 0-1.

14 May 1995 Second round	Kilshannig	0-07 - 1-18	Valley Rovers	Coachford Sportsfield
	P O'Connell 0-3, D O'Connell 0-1, T Twomey 0-1, N Noonan 0-1, W O'Riordan 0-1.		A Crowley 1-4, F Crowley 0-7, J Shield 0-2, J Bernard 0-2, J Hurley 0-1, David Callinan 0-1, Denis Callinan 0-1.

18 June 1995 Second round	Kilmurry	0-11 - 2-03	Nemo Rangers	Ballinhassig Grounds
	J Clifford 0-4, Denis Moss 0-2, J O'Leary 0-2, J Fleming 0-1, S Murphy 0-1, P Clifford 0-1.		P Lambert 1-2, G Murphy 1-0, D Linehan 0-1.

9 July 1995 Second round	Newcestown	0-09 - 2-16	Delaneys	Ovens Grounds
	P Condon 0-5, P Kenneally 0-1, D McCarthy 0-1, D Long 0-1, E Kenneally 0-1.		D Power 2-4, K Egan 0-4, D Quinlan 0-3, B Egan 0-2, G Healy 0-1, D McElhinney 0-1, M O'Neill 0-1.

16 July 1995 Second round	Bishopstown	0-11 - 3-07	St. Michael's	Ballinlough Grounds
	L Meaney 0-3, V Murray 0-3, D O'Brien 0-2, R Oldham 0-2, D Fleming 0-1.		D O'Connell 2-3, P Kiely 1-0, A Ryan 0-3, J O'Connell 0-1.

=== Quarter-finals ===
7 July 1995 Quarter-final	Clyda Rovers	0-15 - 1-03	Erin's Own	Glenville Grounds
	R Walsh 0-5, T Murphy 0-3, T Walsh 0-2, C Cronin 0-1, M O'Shea 0-1, C O'Sullivan 0-1, T McGlinchey 0-1, P O'Mullane 0-1,		P Geasley 1-0, M Mulcahy 0-1, J Corcoran 0-1, B Corcoran 0-1.

9 July 1995 Quarter-final	Dohenys	1-09 - 0-09	Castletownbere	Wolfe Tone Park
	T Buckley 0-4, F Collins 1-0, C Crowley 0-3, Barry Herlihy 0-2.		D Healy 0-4, S Spencer 0-3, Martin O'Sullivan 0-2.

5 August 1995 Quarter-final	Kilmurry	0-13 - 1-10	St. Michael's	Ballinora Grounds
	Denis Moss 0-6, J O'Leary 0-2, TJ O'Leary 0-2, J Clifford 0-2, S Murphy 0-1.		P Kiely 1-0, A Ryan 0-3, D O'Connell 0-2, K Dennehy 0-2, C Kennedy 0-2, T Scally 0-1.

6 August 1995 Quarter-final	Valley Rovers	2-08 - 0-08	Delaneys	Páirc Liam Mhic Cárthaigh
	C O'Donovan 2-1, A Crowley 0-3, E McCarthy 0-2, J Shields 0-1, J Hurley 0-1.		D Quinlan 0-3, D Power 0-2, K Egan 0-1, P Cummins 0-1, M O'Neill 0-1.

19 August 1995 Quarter-final replay	Kilmurry	2-11 - 0-07	St. Michael's	Ballinora Grounds
	Denis Moss 1-3, TJ O'Leary 1-2, J Clifford 0-4, S Murphy 0-1, J Fleming 0-1.		A Ryan 0-2, J Cashman 0-2, D O'Connell 0-2, P Fitzgerald 0-1.

=== Semi-finals ===
26 August 1995 Semi-final	Kilmurry	0-12 - 0-10	Valley Rovers	Ballincollig Grounds
	J Clifford 0-5, Denis Moss 0-5, P Clifford 0-2.		E McCarthy 0-6, D Callanan 0-2, F Crowley 0-1, TJ Deasy 0-1.

26 August 1995 Semi-final	Dohenys	2-08 - 1-11	Clyda Rovers	Carrigadrohid Grounds
	C Crowley 0-5, Barry Herlihy 1-0, Mark Farr 1-0, D Lyons 0-2, K Murray 0-1.		F Dorgan 1-2, R Walsh 0-4, C O'Sullivan 0-3, T McGlinchey 0-1, J Walsh 0-1.

2 September 1995 Semi-final replay	Dohenys	1-05 - 0-07	Clyda Rovers	Carrigadrohid Grounds
	C Crowley 1-0, T Buckley 0-2, D Lyons 0-1, D Collins 0-1, Barry Herlihy 0-1.		R Walsh 0-5, C O'Sullivan 0-1, F Dorgan 0-1.

=== Final ===
10 September 1995 Final	Dohenys	0-11 - 0-07	Kilmurry	Charlie Hurley Park
	T Buckley 0-3, Barry Herlihy 0-2, E Lehane 0-2, C Crowley 0-2, F Collins 0-1, Mark Farr 0-1.		D Moss 0-2, J Clifford 0-1, G O'Leary 0-1, TJ O'Leary 0-1, J Fleming 0-1, S Murphy 0-1.	Referee: N Barrett (Carrigtwohill)

== Championship statistics ==
=== Top scorers ===
Overall

Rank	Player	Club	Tally	Total	Matches	Average
1	Denis Moss	Kilmurry	1-22	25	6	4.16
2	Robert Walsh	Clyda Rovers	0-18	18	4	4.50
2	John Clifford	Kilmurry	0-18	18	6	3.00
4	Derek Power	Delaneys	3-08	17	3	5.66
4	Cathal Crowley	Dohenys	1-14	17	3	5.66
6	Damien O'Connell	St. Michael's	2-07	13	3	4.33
6	Barry Herlihy	Dohenys	2-07	13	5	2.60
6	Ciarán O'Sullivan	Urhan	0-13	13	2	6.50
9	T. J. O'Leary	Kilmurry	2-06	12	6	2.00
9	Kevin Egan	Delaneys	1-09	12	3	4.00
9	Aidan Ryan	St. Michael's	0-12	12	4	3.00

In a single game

Rank	Player	Club	Tally	Total	Opposition
1	Derek Power	Delaneys	2-04	10	Newcestown
2	Tony O'Keeffe	Erin's Own	2-03	9	Douglas
2	Damien O'Connell	St. Michael's	2-03	9	Bishopstown
4	Chris O'Donovan	Valley Rovers	2-01	7	Delaneys
4	Kevin Egan	Delaneys	1-04	7	Carrigaline
4	Aidan Crowley	Valley Rovers	1-04	7	Kilshannig
4	Ciarán O'Sullivan	Urhan	0-07	7	Nemo Rangers
4	Fachtna Crowley	Valley Rovers	0-07	7	Kilshannig
9	James Fleming	Kilmurry	2-00	6	Cobh
9	Timmy Murphy	Kilmurry	2-00	6	Cobh
9	John O'Flynn	St. Michael's	1-03	6	Knocknagree
9	Denis Moss	Kilmurry	1-03	6	St. Michael's
9	Pádraig Condon	Newcestown	0-06	6	St. Finbarr's
9	Ciarán O'Sullivan	Urhan	0-06	6	Nemo Rangers
9	John Corcoran	Erin's Own	0-06	6	Douglas
9	Daniel Healy	Castletownbere	0-06	6	St. Vincent's
9	Denis Moss	Kilmurry	0-06	6	St. Michael's
9	Éamonn McCarthy	Valley Rovers	0-06	6	Kilmurry
