= 1998 Cork Junior A Football Championship =

- Dates: 10 October – 6 December 1998
- Teams: 8
- Champions: Newmarket (2nd title); John Paul O'Neill (captain)
- Runners-up: Killavullen; Martin Carroll (captain)

Tournament statistics
- Matches played: 8
- Goals scored: 8 (1 per match)
- Points scored: 142 (17.75 per match)

The 1998 Cork Junior A Football Championship was the 100th staging of the Cork Junior A Football Championship since its establishment by Cork County Board in 1895. The championship ran from 10 October to 6 December 1998.

The final was played on 6 December 1998 at Páirc Uí Chaoimh in Cork, between newmarket and Killavullen, in what was their first ever meeting in the final. Newmarket won the match by 0–09 to 0–08 to claim their second championship title overall and a first title in 28 years.

== Qualification ==
Division	Championship	Champions
Avondhu	North Cork Junior A Football Championship	Killavullen
Beara	Beara Junior A Football Championship	Adrigole
Carbery	South West Junior A Football Championship	Carbery Rangers
Carrigdhoun	South East Junior A Football Championship	Crosshaven
Duhallow	Duhallow Junior A Football Championship	Newmarket
Imokilly	East Cork Junior A Football Championship	Fr O'Neill's
Muskerry	Mid Cork Junior A Football Championship	Donoughmore
Seandún	City Junior A Football Championship	Brian Dillons

== Results ==
=== Quarter-finals ===
10 October 1998 Quarter-final	Donoughmore	0–11 – 1–07	Fr O'Neill's	Kilbarry Grounds

11 October 1998 Quarter-final	Brian Dillons	0–13 – 0–12	Adrigole	St Mary's Park

18 October 1998 Quarter-final	Killavullen	2–14 – 1–12	Carbery Rangers	Cloughduv Grounds

7 November 1998 Quarter-final	Newmarket	1–11 – 0–01	Crosshaven	O'Connell Park

=== Semi-finals ===
8 November 1998 Semi-final	Killavullen	0–09 – 0–08	Donoughmore	Ballyclough Grounds

15 November 1998 Semi-final	Newmarket	1–06 – 1–06	Brian Dillons	Kilmurry Grounds

22 November 1998 Semi-final replay	Newmarket	1–09 – 0–06	Brian Dillons	Kilmurry Grounds

=== Final ===
6 December 1998 Final	Newmarket	0–09 – 0–08	Killavullen	Páirc Uí Chaoimh
	M O'Sullivan 0–2 (0–2 frees), JP O'Neill 0–2, T O'Keeffe 0–2, J Cronin 0–1, D O'Brien 0–1, D Culloty 0–1 (0–1 free)).		M Carroll 0–4 (0–3 frees), B O’Driscoll 0–2, D Hartnett 0–1, I O’Driscoll 0–1.	Referee: M Collins (Clonakilty)
