= Cian O'Riordan =

Irish Gaelic footballer

Personal information
- Native name: Cian Ó Riordáin (Irish)
- Born: 1983 (age 42–43) Mallow, County Cork, Ireland

Sport
- Sport: Gaelic football
- Position: Right wing-forward
Clubs
Years	Club	Apps (scores)
1999-2021 2011-2013; 2017	Mallow → Avondhu	28 (10-99); 17 (2-43)
Club titles
- Cork titles: 0
Inter-county*
Years	County	Apps (scores)
2005	Cork	0 (0-00)
Inter-county titles
- Munster titles: 0
- All-Irelands: 0
- NFL: 0
- All Stars: 0
- *Inter County team apps and scores correct as of 23:39, 24 April 2020.

Cian O'Riordan (born 1983) is an Irish Gaelic footballer who plays for club side Mallow. He has also lined out with divisional side Avondhu and at inter-county level with the Cork senior football team. He usually lines out in the forwards.

== Career statistics ==
=== Club ===
As of match played 27 September 2020.

Team	Season	Cork SFC		Munster		All-Ireland		Total	
Team	Season	Apps	Score	Apps	Score	Apps	Score	Apps	Score
Mallow	1999	0	0-00	—		—		0	0-00
Mallow	2000	0	0-00	—		—		0	0-00
Mallow	2001	0	0-00	—		—		0	0-00
Mallow	2002	0	0-00	—		—		0	0-00
Mallow	2003	3	2-07	—		—		3	2-07
Mallow	2004	5	0-11	—		—		5	0-11
Mallow	2005	2	1-06	—		—		2	1-06
Mallow	2006	5	3-16	—		—		5	3-16
Mallow	Total	15	6-40	—		—		15	6-40
Mallow	Year	Cork PIFC		Munster		All-Ireland		Total	
Mallow	Year	Apps	Score	Apps	Score	Apps	Score	Apps	Score
Mallow	2007	4	1-17	2	0-08	—		6	1-25
Mallow	Total	4	1-17	2	0-08	—		6	1-25
Mallow	Year	Cork SFC		Munster		All-Ireland		Total	
Mallow	Year	Apps	Score	Apps	Score	Apps	Score	Apps	Score
Mallow	2008	4	1-16	—		—		4	1-16
Mallow	2009	4	3-14	—		—		4	3-14
Mallow	Total	8	4-30	—		—		8	4-30
Mallow	Year	Cork PIFC		Munster		All-Ireland		Total	
Mallow	Year	Apps	Score	Apps	Score	Apps	Score	Apps	Score
Mallow	2010	6	1-31	—		—		6	1-31
Mallow	2011	3	1-15	—		—		3	1-15
Mallow	2012	4	1-28	—		—		4	1-28
Mallow	2013	2	0-05	—		—		2	0-05
Mallow	2014	5	1-16	—		—		5	1-16
Mallow	2015	2	1-12	—		—		2	1-12
Mallow	2016	3	1-19	—		—		3	1-19
Mallow	2017	5	0-21	2	0-09	—		7	0-30
Mallow	Total	30	6-147	2	0-09	—		32	6-156
Mallow	Year	Cork SFC		Munster		All-Ireland		Total	
Mallow	Year	Apps	Score	Apps	Score	Apps	Score	Apps	Score
Mallow	2018	3	0-19	—		—		3	0-19
Mallow	2019	2	0-10	—		—		2	0-10
Mallow	Total	5	0-29	—		—		5	0-29
Mallow	Year	Cork SAFC		Munster		All-Ireland		Total	
Mallow	Year	Apps	Score	Apps	Score	Apps	Score	Apps	Score
Mallow	2020	4	2-19	—		—		4	2-19
Mallow	Total	4	2-19	—		—		4	2-19
Career total		66	19-282	4	0-17	—		70	19-299

== Honours ==
Mallow

- Cork Premier Intermediate Football Championship: 2007, 2017

Cork

- Munster Under-21 Football Championship: 2004
