= Newmarket, County Cork =

Town in County Cork, Ireland

Newmarket Irish: Áth Trasna
- Town
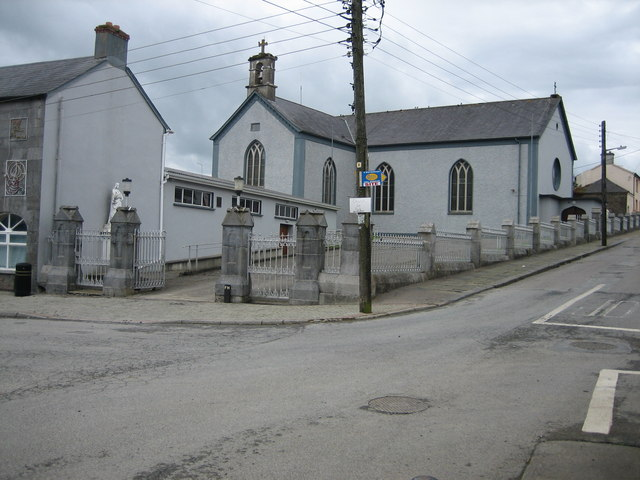
- Saint Mary's Catholic Church

- Location in Ireland
- Coordinates: 52°12′54″N 9°00′11″W
- Country: Ireland
- Province: Munster
- County: County Cork
- Elevation: 175 m (574 ft)

Population (2022)
  - Total: 1,052
- Time zone: UTC+0 (WET)
  - Summer (DST): UTC-1 (IST (WEST))
- Irish Grid Reference: R314076

Newmarket, historically known as Aghatrasna (Irish: Áth Trasna), is a town in the barony of Duhallow, County Cork, Ireland. It is situated at the junction of the R576 and R578 regional roads. Newmarket is within the Cork North-West Dáil constituency.

== History ==
The foundation of the town of Newmarket can be dated to the early 1600s, when King James I granted the lands which had formerly been held by the McAuliffe clan to the Aldworth family, with the right to hold a market there. The Aldworths remained at Newmarket until the 1920s: their family seat was Newmarket Court. The town was beginning to develop by 1620.

Newmarket Train Station opened in 1889 as the line from Banteer to Newmarket was built at 8 3/4 miles long and had only one station at Kanturk. Due to the unprofitability of the line, it closed in February 1963. The station in Newmarket is still intact, and is now used as an office building for a local business.

== Amenities and community ==
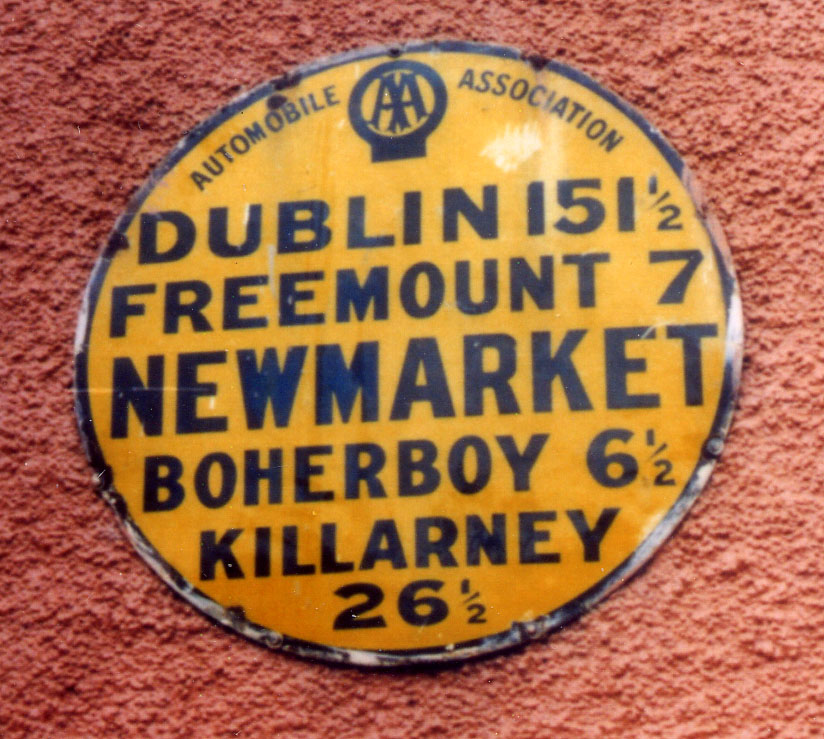
Old Automobile Association sign indicating distance from Newmarket to Boherboy and Freemount

The local Roman Catholic church is dedicated to Saint Mary and was built in 1840. The Church of Ireland (Anglican) church is on the town's main street and was built circa 1830.

There are several national (primary) schools serving the area, including Newmarket Girls National School and Newmarket Boys School. The nearest secondary schools are in Boherbue and Kanturk.

Glenlara GAA and Newmarket GAA are the local Gaelic Athletic Association clubs. Newmarket Celtic FC is a local soccer club.

== Twin towns ==
Newmarket is twinned with:

- Lakeview, Oregon in the United States of America
- Mauron in France

== Notable people ==
- Tony Buckley (b.1980), Irish international rugby player
- Jerry Cronin (b.1957), former Cork hurler who played with Newmarket GAA club
- Danny Culloty (b.1964), former Cork footballer
- John Philpot Curran (1750–1817), the Irish orator and lawyer, was born in 1750 in Newmarket. He is credited as being the originator of the saying "The cost of Liberty is Eternal Vigilance".
- Sarah Curran (1782–1808), daughter of the above, was the love of Irish rebel leader Robert Emmet. After her death in 1808, she was buried in Newmarket.
- Seán Moylan (1889–1957), Irish Republican Army commandant and later Minister for Agriculture, lived in Newmarket
- Edward Worth (c.1620–1669), Bishop of Killaloe, was born in Newmarket about 1620, son of the local (and probably the first) Church of Ireland vicar of Newmarket, James Worth.
- Barry Yelverton, 1st Viscount Avonmore (1736–1805), politician and judge, born and raised near Newmarket.

== See also ==
- List of abbeys and priories in Ireland (County Cork)
- List of towns and villages in Ireland
- Mac Amhlaoibh and Mac Amhalghaidh (Irish septs), see Mac Amhlaoibh (sept of Mac Cárthaigh) which was seated at Newmarket.
