= Mattie Taylor =

Irish Gaelic footballer

Personal information
- Native name: Maitiú Táilliúir (Irish)
- Nickname: Mattie
- Born: 12 November 1993 (age 32) Mallow, County Cork, Ireland
- Occupation: Engineer
- Height: 6 ft 3 in (191 cm)

Sport
- Sport: Gaelic Football
- Position: Right wing-back
Club
- Years: Club
- Mallow
Club titles
- Cork titles: 0
College
- Years: College
- 2012-2016: Cork Institute of Technology
College titles
- Sigerson titles: 1
Inter-county*
Years	County	Apps (scores)
2017-present	Cork	2 (0-00)
Inter-county titles
- Munster titles: 0
- All-Irelands: 0
- NFL: 0
- All Stars: 0
- *Inter County team apps and scores correct as of 23:04, 15 April 2019.

Matthew Taylor (born 12 November 1993) is an Irish Gaelic footballer who plays for Cork Senior Championship club Mallow and at inter-county level with the Cork senior football team. He usually lines out as a right corner-forward.

== Honours ==
Mallow

- Cork Senior A Football Championship (1) 2021
- Cork Premier Intermediate Football Championship (1): 2017
