= Culloty =

Culloty is an Irish Gaelic surname, from Ó Codlata. Notable people with the surname include:

- Danny Culloty (born 1964), Irish Gaelic football coach and former player
- Jim Culloty, Irish jockey and racehorse trainer
- Johnny Culloty (1936–2025), Irish Gaelic football and hurling sportsperson
