= 1966 Cork Junior Football Championship =

- Dates: 9 October – 11 December 1966
- Teams: 8
- Champions: Dohenys (2nd title); D. D. Lyons (captain)
- Runners-up: Grange; Tom Bermingham (captain)

Tournament statistics
- Matches played: 9
- Goals scored: 23 (2.56 per match)
- Points scored: 122 (13.56 per match)

The 1966 Cork Junior Football Championship was the 68th staging of the Cork Junior A Football Championship since its establishment by Cork County Board in 1895. The championship ran from 9 October to 11 December 1966.

The final, which went to a replay, was played on 11 December 1966 at the Athletic Grounds in Cork, between Dohenys and Grange, in what was their first ever meeting in the final. Dohenys won the match by 3–08 to 1–06 to claim their second championship title overall and a first title in 31 years.

== Qualification ==
Division	Championship	Champions
Avondhu	North Cork Junior A Football Championship	Grange
Beara	Beara Junior A Football Championship	Adrigole
Carbery	South West Junior A Football Championship	Dohenys
Carrigdhoun	South East Junior A Football Championship	Crosshaven
Duhallow	Duhallow Junior A Football Championship	Knocknagree
Imokilly	East Cork Junior A Football Championship	Glanmire
Muskerry	Mid Cork Junior A Football Championship	Ballincollig
Seandún	City Junior A Football Championship	St. Vincent's

== Results ==
=== Quarter-finals ===
9 October 1966 Quarter-final	Adrigole	1–11 – 2–03	Glanmire	Sam Maguire Park
	M O'Regan 1–2, B O'Neill 0–3, EJ O'Sullivan 0–2, P Carey 0–2, GJ O'Sullivan 0–1, F Power 0–1.		P Barry 1–2, M McCarthy 1–1.

16 October 1966 Quarter-final	Ballincollig	2–10 – 2–05	Crosshaven	Ballincollig Grounds
	B Fitton 2–0, M Buckley 0–3, J Fitton 0–2, G Regan 0–2, D Fitton 0–2, S Barry-Murphy 0–1.		T Sheehan 1–0, H Murphy 1–0, B Murphy 0–3, MJ Fitzgerald 0–1, M Lucey 0–1.

16 October 1966 Quarter-final	Dohenys	0–09 – 1–05	St. Vincent's	Charlie Hurley Park
	Eamon Young 0–5, P Smith 0–2, B O'Rourke 0–1, J Crowley 0–1.		C O'Shea 1–1, P Twomey 0–2, D O'Sullivan 0–1, B O'Halloran 0–1.

30 October 1966 Quarter-final	Grange	0–09 – 1–04	Knocknagree	Kanturk Grounds

=== Semi-finals ===
30 October 1966 Semi-final	Dohenys	1–06 – 0–09	Adrigole	Rossa Park
	M Byrne 1–1, J Carroll 0–3, A Collins 0–1, Eamon Young 0–1.		M O'Regan 0–3, B O'Neill 0–2, J O'Sullivan 0–2, JJ O'Sullivan 0–1, PJ O'Sullivan 0–1.	Referee: P Cronin (St. Finbarr's)

6 November 1966 Semi-final replay	Dohenys	3–08 – 2–05	Adrigole	Rossa Park
	D Collins 2–0, P Burns 1–0, J Crowley 0–3, Eamon Young 0–2, Edda Young 0–2, B O'Rourke 0–2.		S Power 2–0, M O'Regan 0–1, E O'Sullivan 0–1, P O'Sullivan 0–1, PJ O'Sullivan 0–1, B O'Neill 0–1.

6 November 1966 Semi-final	Grange	1–11 – 1–06	Ballincollig	Cork Athletic Grounds
	T Barry 1–1, P Gowen 0–3, N Kirby 0–3, D Bermingham 0–2, J Gowen 0–1, W Hanrahan 0–1.

=== Final ===
27 November 1966 Final	Dohenys	1–04 – 1–04	Grange	Cork Athletic Grounds
	H McCullough 1–0, J Crowley 0–2, Eamon Young 0–1, J Young 0–1.		D Bermingham 1–0, J Cummins 0–1, J Clifford 0–1, N Kirby 0–1, PJ Kirby 0–1.	Referee: P Cronin (St. Finbarr's)

11 December 1966 Final replay	Dohenys	3–08 – 1–06	Grange	Cork Athletic Grounds
	Eamon Young 0–5, J Carroll 1–0, J Young 1–0, A Collins 1–0, Edda Young 0–1, J Crowley 0–1, B O'Rourke 0–1.		W Clifford 1–0, J Gowen 0–2, E Kirby 0–2, W Hanrahan 0–1, D Bermingham 0–1.	Referee: P Cronin (St. Finbarr's)
