= 1897 Cork Senior Football Championship =

Gaelic football competition

- Champions: Dohenys (1st title)
- Runners-up: Kanturk

The 1897 Cork Senior Football Championship was the 11th staging of the Cork Senior Football Championship since its establishment by the Cork County Board in 1887.

Lees were the defending champions.

Dohenys won the championship following a 0–05 to 0–04 defeat of Kanturk in a replay of the final at Cork Park. It remains their only championship title.

== Results ==
=== Final ===
| Final | Dohenys | 1-01 - 0-04 | Kanturk | Cork Park |

=== Final replay ===
| Final replay | Dohenys | 0-05 - 0-04 | Kanturk | Cork Park |

== Statistics ==
=== Miscellaneous ===
- Dohenys win the title for the first time.
