= 1914 Cork Junior Hurling Championship =

Irish hurling competition

- Champions: Mallow (1st title)
- Runners-up: Rangers

The 1914 Cork Junior Hurling Championship was the 20th staging of the Cork Junior Hurling Championship since its establishment by the Cork County Board in 1895.

The final was played on 22 November 1914 at the Athletic Grounds in Mallow, between Mallow and Rangers, in what was their first ever meeting in the final. Mallow won the match by 9-03 to 1-01 to claim their first ever championship title.

== Results ==
=== Final ===
22 November 1914 Final	Mallow	9-03 - 1-01	Rangers	Mallow Athletic Grounds
