= Jerry Cronin (hurler) =

Irish hurler

Personal information
- Native name: Diarmuid Ó Cróinín (Irish)
- Born: 1956 (age 69–70) Newmarket, County Cork, Ireland

Sport
- Sport: Hurling
- Position: Goalkeeper
Club
- Years: Club
- Newmarket
Club titles
- Cork titles: 0
Inter-county
Years	County	Apps (scores)
1977-1979	Cork	0 (0-00)
Inter-county titles
- Munster titles: 3
- All-Irelands: 2
- NHL: 0
- All Stars: 0

Jeremiah "Jerry" Cronin (born 1957) is an Irish retired hurler who played as a goalkeeper for the Cork senior team.

Cronin joined the team during the 1977 championship and was a regular member of the extended panel until his retirement after the 1979 championship. During that time he won two All-Ireland medals and three Munster medals as a non-playing substitute. Cronin was also an All-Ireland and Munster medalist in the junior grade.

At club level Cronin was a four-time junior divisional championship medalist with Newmarket.

== Honours ==
=== Team ===
Newmarket

- Duhallow Junior A Hurling Championship (4): 1974, 1975, 1976, 1979

Cork

- All-Ireland Senior Hurling Championship (2): 1977 (sub), 1978 (sub)
- Munster Senior Hurling Championship (3): 1977 (sub), 1978 (sub), 1979 (sub)
- All-Ireland Junior Hurling Championship (1): 1983
- Munster Junior Hurling Championship (1): 1983
- All-Ireland Under-21 Hurling Championship (1): 1976
- Munster Under-21 Hurling Championship (2): 1976, 1977
- All-Ireland Minor Hurling Championship (1): 1974
- Munster Minor Hurling Championship (1): 1974
