= 1972 Cork Intermediate Football Championship =

Gaelic football competition

- Dates: 16 April – 22 October 1972
- Teams: 11
- Champions: Dohenys (1st title); Brendan O'Rourke (captain)
- Runners-up: Glanworth

Tournament statistics
- Matches played: 10
- Goals scored: 19 (1.9 per match)
- Points scored: 204 (20.4 per match)

The 1972 Cork Intermediate Football Championship was the 37th staging of the Cork Intermediate Football Championship since its establishment by the Cork County Board in 1909. The draw for the first round fixtures took place on 30 January 1972. The championship ran from 16 April to 22 October 1972.

The final was played on 22 October 1972 at the Athletic Grounds in Cork, between Dohenys and Glanworth, in what was their first ever meeting in the final. Dohenys won the match by 4–10 to 1–07 to claim their first ever championship title.

== Results ==
=== First round ===
16 April 1972 First round	Bishopstown	1-11 - 1-05	Kilmurry	Cloughduv Grounds

18 June 1972 First round	St Michael's	1-10 - 1-08	Cobh	Páirc Shéamuis de Barra

2 July 1972 First round	Youghal	0-07 - 0-13	Glanworth	Clonmult Memorial Park

=== Second round ===
23 April 1972 Second round	Canovee	1-17 - 0-03	St Vincent's	Páirc Uí Chonchúir

7 May 1972 Second round	Dohenys	2-11 - 0-10	Newmarket	Castle Grounds

18 May 1972 Second round	Bishopstown	0-17 - 2-07	St Finbarr's	Cork Athletic Grounds

27 August 1972 Second round	St Michael's	1-18 - 1-20	Glanworth	Castlelyons Grounds

=== Semi-finals ===
23 July 1972 Semi-final	Dohenys	0-11 - 1-05	Canovee	Clonakilty Grounds

17 September 1972 Semi-final	Bishopstown	0-06 - 2-08	Glanworth	Castlelyons Grounds

=== Final ===
22 October 1972 Final	Dohenys	4-10 - 1-07	Glanworth	Cork Athletic Grounds
	B O'Rourke 1-2, V Sullivan 1-1, D Crowley 1-1, A Collins 1-0, D Collins 0-2, DJ Carroll 0-2, S O'Sullivan 0-1, C O'Rourke 0-1.		J Courtney 0-6, T Linehan 1-0, D Ahern 0-1.	Referee: P Cronin (St. Finbarr's)
