= 1996 All-Ireland Junior Football Championship =

Gaelic football tournament held in 1996

All Ireland Champions
- Winners: Cork (11th win)
- Captain: Kieran Creed
- Manager: Johnny O'Mahony

All Ireland Runners-up
- Runners-up: Meath
- Manager: Dudley Farrell

Provincial Champions
- Munster: Cork
- Leinster: Meath
- Ulster: Not Played
- Connacht: Galway

The 1996 All-Ireland Junior Football Championship was the 66th staging of the All-Ireland Junior Championship, the Gaelic Athletic Association's second tier Gaelic football championship.

Mayo entered the championship as the defending champions, however, they were beaten by Galway in the Connacht final.

The All-Ireland final was played on 31 August 1996 at Semple Stadium in Thurles, between Cork and Meath, in what was their first ever meeting in the final. Cork won the match by 4–11 to 0–10 to claim their 11th championship title overall and a first title in three years.

== All-Ireland Junior Football Championship ==
=== All-Ireland semi-finals ===
7 August 1996 Semi-final	Yorkshire	0-16 - 2-06	Meath	Leeds Grounds

7 August 1996 Semi-final	Cork	0-12 - 1-05	Galway	Cusack Park

=== All-Ireland final ===
31 August 1996 Final	Cork	4-11 - 0-10	Meath	Semple Stadium
