= 1935 Cork Junior Football Championship =

Irish Gaelic football competition

- Champions: Dohenys (1st title)
- Runners-up: St Anne's

The 1935 Cork Junior Football Championship was the 37th staging of the Cork Junior Football Championship since its establishment by the Cork County Board in 1895.

The final was played on 8 December 1935 at the Enniskeane Grounds, between Dohenys and St Anne's, in what was their first ever meeting in the final. Dohenys won the match by 1–03 to 0–03 to claim their first ever championship title.

== Results ==
=== Final ===
8 December 1935 Final	Dohenys	1-03 - 0-03	St Anne's	Enniskeane Grounds
