= Brendan Larkin =

Irish Gaelic footballer

Personal information
- Native name: Breandán Ó Lorcáin (Irish)
- Born: 1943 (age 82–83) Douglas, Cork, Ireland

Sport
- Sport: Gaelic football
- Position: Centre-back
Club
- Years: Club
- Douglas
Club titles
- Cork titles: 0
Inter-county*
| Years | County | Apps (scores) |
| 1964 | Cork | 0 (0-00) |
Inter-county titles
- Munster titles: 0
- All-Irelands: 0
- NFL: 0
- *Inter County team apps and scores correct as of 00:29, 15 July 2014.

Brendan Larkin (born 1943) is an Irish retired Gaelic footballer who played as a centre-back for the Cork senior football team.

Born in Douglas, Cork, Larkin first played competitive football in his youth. He arrived on the inter-county scene at the age of seventeen when he first linked up with the Cork minor team, before later joining the under-21 side. He joined the senior panel during the 1964 championship and played for just one season.

At club level Larkin played with Douglas.

== Honours ==
=== Team ===
Cork

- Munster Under-21 Football Championship (1): 1963 (sub)
- All-Ireland Minor Football Championship (1): 1961
- Munster Minor Football Championship (2): 1960, 1961
