= Ollie Rue O'Sullivan =

Irish Gaelic footballer and manager

Personal information
- Nickname: Rue
- Born: 1972 (age 53–54) Allihies, County Cork, Ireland
- Occupation: Managing director

Sport
- Sport: Gaelic football
- Position: Left wing-back
Clubs
- Years: Club
- Garnish → Beara
Club titles
- Cork titles: 1
Inter-county*
Years	County	Apps (scores)
1996-1998	Cork	0 (0-00)
Inter-county titles
- Munster titles: 0
- All-Irelands: 0
- NFL: 0
- All Stars: 0
- *Inter County team apps and scores correct as of 22:53, 9 September 2021.

Ollie Rue O'Sullivan (born 1972) is an Irish Gaelic football selector and former player. At club level he played with Garnish and Beara and was also a member of the Cork senior football team. O'Sullivan lined out as both a defender and a forward.

== Playing career ==
O'Sullivan began his Gaelic football career at juvenile and underage levels with Garnish, before winning several Beara Junior Championship titles with the club's top adult team. His success at divisional level saw him drafted onto the Beara divisional team and he captained the team to the Cork Senior Football Championship title in 1997. O'Sullivan first appeared on the inter-county scene during a two-year stint with the Cork minor team before later lining out with the under-21 side. He was a two-time All-Ireland Junior Football Championship winner with the Cork junior team and spent a number of seasons with the Cork senior football team.

== Coaching career ==
O'Sullivan served as a selector with the Cork minor football team during Bobbie O'Dwyer's tenure as manager. In 2019, he was part of the management team that secured the All-Ireland Minor Football Championship title after a win over Galway

== Honours ==
=== Player ===
Beara

- Cork Senior Football Championship: 1997 (c)

Cork

- All-Ireland Junior Football Championship: 1993, 1996
- Munster Junior Football Championship: 1993, 1996

=== Management ===
Cork

- All-Ireland Minor Football Championship: 2019
