= Mallow GAA =

Gaelic games club in County Cork, Ireland

Mallow
- Mala/Maghealla
- Founded: 1887
- County: Cork
- Colours: Red and yellow
- Grounds: Mallow GAA Sports Complex
- Coordinates: 52°08′40.41″N 8°37′17.81″W

Playing kits
Standard colours

Senior Club Championships
	All Ireland	Munster champions	Cork champions
Football:	0	0	0
Hurling:	0	0	0

Mallow GAA is a Gaelic Athletic Association club based in the town of Mallow, County Cork, Ireland. The club fields teams in hurling, Gaelic football, Camogie and Ladies Gaelic Football (LGFA).

The club's hurling team competes in the Cork Intermediate A Hurling Championship having been relegated from the Cork Premier Intermediate Hurling Championship in 2025. The club's Gaelic football team competes in the Cork Premier Senior Football Championship having won the Cork Senior A Football Championship in 2021.

== History ==
Founded in 1887, the Mallow club enjoyed its first success at adult level when the Cork JHC title was won after a defeat of Rangers in 1914. Further success followed when the Cork IHC was claimed in 1923, giving the club senior status for the first time. Mallow's time in the top flight saw them record one of the biggest shocks in the first 50 years of the championship when they beat 18-time and reigning champions Blackrock in the 1928 second round. They were subsequently beaten by Éire Óg in their only appearance in a senior final. In spite of this, Mallow claimed further Cork IHC titles in 1959 and 1972.

Mallow's second century saw the club enjoy many Gaelic football successes. A Cork IFC title in 1992 was followed by Cork PIFC triumphs in 2007 and 2017. Mallow claimed their first ever senior title when they beat St. Michael's to take the Cork SAFC title in 2021.

In 2022, a Seven-goal blitz saw Mallow win the Minor Hurling Challenge Cup at Páirc Uí Rinn beating their opponents Inniscarra on a scoreline of Mallow 7-14 Inniscarra 0-13.

== Roll of honour ==
- Cork Senior A Football Championship
  - (gold) Winners (1): 2021
  - (silver) Runners-Up (1): 2020
- Cork Premier Intermediate Football Championship
  - (gold) Winners (2): 2007, 2017
  - (silver) Runners-Up (0)
- Cork Intermediate A Hurling Championship
  - (gold) Winners (3): 1923, 1959, 1972
  - (silver) Runners-Up (8): 1916, 1917, 1918, 1955, 1979, 1980, 1987, 2001
- Cork Intermediate A Football Championship
  - (gold) Winners (1): 1992
  - (silver) Runners-Up (2): 1924, 1989
- Cork Junior A Hurling Championship
  - (gold) Winners (1): 1914
  - (silver) Runners-Up (1): 1950
- Cork Junior B Inter-Divisional Football Championship (1): 2020
- North Cork Junior A Hurling Championship (1): 1926
- North Cork Junior A Football Championship (3): 1929, 1933, 1984
- Cork Under-21 Football Championship (2): 1995, 2000
- North Cork Under-21 Football Championship (2): 2014, 2021,2025
- North Cork Under-21 Hurling Championship (2): 2008, 2013
- North Cork Under-19 Football Championship (1): 2022
- Cork Minor A Football Championship (2): 2007, 2021

== Notable players ==
- Willie Clancy: All-Ireland SHC-winner (1929, 1931)
- James Loughrey: Railway Cup-winner (2012)
- Fergal McCormack: All-Ireland SHC-winner (1999)
- Cormac Murphy: All-Ireland IHC-winner (2018)
- Cian O'Riordan: Munster U21FC-winner (2004)
- Ronan Sheehan: All-Ireland JFC-winner (1993) and All-Ireland JHC-winner (1994)
