= Ronan Sheehan (dual player) =

Irish Gaelic football, hurler and politician

Personal information
- Native name: Rónán Ó Síocháin (Irish)
- Born: 1968 (age 57–58) Mallow, County Cork, Ireland
- Occupation: EPS employee

Sport
- Football Position: Right corner-back
- Hurling Position: Right corner-back
Clubs
- Years: Club
- Mallow → Avondhu
Club titles
	Football	Hurling
Cork titles	0	1
Inter-county
Years	County	Apps (scores)
1992–1993 1993–1995	Cork (F); Cork (H)	0 (0–0); 0 (0–0)
Inter-county titles
	Football	Hurling
Munster Titles	0	0
All-Ireland Titles	0	0
League titles	0	0

Ronan Sheehan (born 1968) is an Irish former hurler, Gaelic footballer and politician. At club level he played with Mallow and Avondhu and was a member of the Cork senior teams as a dual player. Sheehan is also a Labour Party councillor for the Mallow LEA on Cork County Council.

== Sporting career ==
Sheehan first played Gaelic football and hurling with Thomas Davis, the underage section of the Mallow club. After winning the Cork MFC title in 1984, he subsequently progressed onto the club's top adult team in both codes and was part of the Mallow team that won the Cork IFC title in 1992. He also earned selection with Avondhu and was part of the divisional team that won the 1996 Cork SHC.

Sheehan first appeared on the inter-county scene as a dual player at minor level and won Munster MFC and Munster MHC medals in 1985 and 1986 but lost three All-Ireland finals in that grade in the space of 12 months. He was an unused substitute when Cork beat Kilkenny in the 1988 All-Ireland U21HC final. Sheehan captained the Cork junior football team to the 1993 All-Ireland JFC title after a defeat of Laois in the final. He became a dual All-Ireland junior-winner when he came on as a substitute for Cork's defeat of Kilkenny in the 1994 All-Ireland JHC final. Sheehan also made a number of appearances for the Cork senior teams in both codes in a number of tournament and National League games.

Sheehan retired from the club scene in 2006 but immediately became involved in coaching and team management. He managed the Mallow team to the Cork PIFC title in 2007.

== Political career ==
Sheehan was elected to Cork County Council as a Labour Party candidate in the 2009 local elections. He was also elected to Mallow Town Council. Sheehan lost his seat on the County Council after one term. He returned to the council in 2024, having been co-opted onto the council to replace Eoghan Kenny.

== Personal life ==
Sheehan is a former student of St Colman's College, Fermoy and Davis College, Mallow. He worked as a fitter and turner before acquiring a degree in business studies. He is married to Elaine and the couple have four children.

== Honours ==
=== Player ===
Thomas Davis

- Cork Minor Football Championship: 1984

Mallow

- Cork Intermediate Football Championship: 1992
- Cork Intermediate Football Championship: 2001

Avondhu

- Cork Senior Hurling Championship: 1996

Cork

- All-Ireland Junior Football Championship: 1993
- All-Ireland Junior Hurling Championship: 1994
- Munster Junior Football Championship: 1993
- Munster Junior Hurling Championship: 1992, 1994
- All-Ireland Under-21 Hurling Championship: 1988
- Munster Under-21 Hurling Championship: 1988
- Munster Minor Hurling Championship: 1986
- Munster Minor Football Championship: 1985, 1986

=== Manager ===
Mallow

- Cork Premier Intermediate Football Championship: 2007

Achievements
Preceded by John Casey	All-Ireland JFC final winning captain 1993	Succeeded by Michael Keating
