= 1992 Cork Intermediate Football Championship =

Gaelic football competition

- Dates: 9 May – 13 September 1992
- Teams: 19
- Champions: Mallow (1st title); Séamie Murphy (captain)
- Runners-up: Kilmurry; George Plunkett (captain)

Tournament statistics
- Matches played: 20
- Goals scored: 31 (1.55 per match)
- Points scored: 358 (17.9 per match)
- Top scorer(s): Ronan Sheehan (2-15)

The 1992 Cork Intermediate Football Championship was the 57th staging of the Cork Intermediate Football Championship since its establishment by the Cork County Board in 1909. The draw for the opening round fixtures took place on 15 December 1991.

The final was played on 13 September 1992 at Páirc Uí Chaoimh in Cork, between Mallow and Kilmurry, in what was their first ever meeting in a final. Mallow won the match by 1-13 to 2-09 to claim their first ever championship title.

Mallow's Ronan Sheehan was the championship's top scorer with 2-15.

== Results ==
=== First round ===
9 May 1992 First round	Millstreet	1-08 - 0-09	St. Vincent's	Páirc Eoin Mhic Charthaigh
	F Collins 1-1, A Barry 0-3, N Crowley 0-1, E O'Sullivan 0-1, W O'Leary 0-1, JM O'Leary 0-1.		A Elliott 0-3, M O'Neill 0-2, J Gould 0-1, J Downey 0-1, G Cooney 0-1, D Murphy 0-1.	Referee: L O'Flynn (Éire Óg)

23 May 1992 First round	Kilshannig	0-07 - 0-09	Clyda Rovers	Mallow GAA Grounds
	W O'Riordan 0-3, D Ryan 0-2, T Twomey 0-1, N Noonan 0-1.		M O'Hanlon 0-2, J O'Sullivan 0-2, A Looney 0-2, C O'Sullivan 0-1, R Walsh 0-1, F Dorgan 0-1.	Referee: N Barrett (Carrigtwohill)

31 May 1992 First round	Castlemartyr	1-11 - 0-08	Delany Rovers	Páirc Uí Chonaill
	K Murphy 0-8, B Barrett 1-0, S Leahy 0-1, T Barrett 0-1, C Enright 0-1.		G Healy 0-3, M Whelegan 0-1, D McElhinny 0-1, S McElhinny 0-1, C Walsh 0-1, B Egan 0-1.	Referee: J Cummins

=== Second round ===
10 May 1992 Second round	St. Finbarr's	0-09 - 0-08	Castletownbere	Castletownkinneigh GAA Grounds
	M O'Sullivan 0-4, S Spenser 0-2, S Harrington 0-1, J Power 0-1.		S Bergin 0-2, P O'Keeffe 0-2, J Keating 0-2, I Ahern 0-1, F Ramsey 0-1, S Caulfield 0-1.

17 May 1992 Second round	Newcestown	0-09 - 1-12	Valley Rovers	Charlie Hurley Park
	M O'Mahony 0-6, T Crowley 0-2, E Kenneally 0-1.		E McCarthy 0-7, A Crowley 1-0, C O'Donovan 0-2, D O'Sullivan 0-1, J Sheehy 0-1, David Callanan 0-1.	Referee: M Collins (Clonakilty)

31 May 1992 Second round	Bantry Blues	1-08 - 0-12	Kilmurry	Ballingeary GAA Grounds
	K Harrington 1-4, P Goggin 0-2, F Delaney 0-1, J Cotter 0-1.		C Barry-Murphy 0-3, D Moss 0-3, J Clifford 0-2, C Murphy 0-1, S Kearney 0-1, TJ O'Leary 0-1, D O'Sullivan 0-1.	Referee: J O'Mahony (Kanturk)

31 May 1992 Second round	Millstreet	0-07 - 1-09	Mallow	Kanturk GAA Grounds
	A Barry 0-2, F Collins 0-2, JW O'Leary 0-1, E O'Sullivan 0-1,		R Sheehan 1-3, M O'Donovan 0-2, J Hayes 0-2, D O'Shea 0-1, C O'Callaghan 0-1.

31 May 1992 Second round	Douglas	2-08 - 0-10	Rockchapel	Clondrohid GAA Grounds
	E Forde 1-2, A Cotter 1-0, D Larkin 0-3, D Meade 0-2, K Golden 0-1.		G Casey 0-7, J Casey 0-3.	Referee: P Kelleher (Ballingeary)

13 June 1992 Second round	Knocknagree	4-09 - 2-05	Nemo Rangers	Clondrohid GAA Grounds
	N O'Connor 1-4, P O'Connor 1-2, A Cronin 1-1, J Buckley 1-1, F O'Connor 0-1.		N Corkery 1-5, E Fitzgerald 1-0.	Referee: D McCarthy (Dohenys)

20 June 1992 Second round	Naomh Abán	1-06 - 1-14	Ballincollig	Kilmurry GAA Grounds
	L Burke 1-0, D Lynch 0-2, J McCarthy 0-1, M Twomey 0-1, DF Cronin 0-1, DV Cronin 0-1.		P O'Mahony 0-9, T O'Reilly 1-3, G Ring 0-1, F Keane 0-1.	Referee: P Kelleher (Ballingeary)

11 July 1992 Second round	Castlemartyr	0-06 - 1-10	Clyda Rovers	Felix Sarsfield Memorial Park
	K Murphy 0-5, M Broderick 0-1.		A Looney 0-4, R Walsh 1-0, M O'Hanlon 0-2, D Corbett 0-1, T McGlinchey 0-1, C O'Sullivan 0-1, F Dorgan 0-1.

=== Quarter-finals ===
11 July 1992 Quarter-final	Knocknagree	2-07 - 2-07	Ballincollig	Castle Grounds
	D O'Connor 1-1, J Buckley 1-0, F O'Connor 0-3, D Fitzgerald 0-2, D Guiney 0-1.		T O'Reilly 1-1, F Keohane 1-0, G Glavin 0-2, P O'Mahony 0-2, J Ring 0-1, B Murphy 0-1.

12 July 1992 Quarter-final	St. Finbarr's	0-09 - 0-09	Douglas	Ballinlough GAA Grounds
	K Nagle 0-3, J O'Donoghue 0-3, M Healy 0-1, F Ramsey 0-1.		N McSorley 0-4, R McCarthy 0-1, D Larkin 0-1, K Golden 0-1, E Forde 0-1, J Horgan 0-1.

19 July 1992 Quarter-final replay	St. Finbarr's	1-07 - 0-08	Douglas	Ballinlough GAA Grounds
	E Foley 1-3, K Nagle 0-3, J O'Donoghue 0-1.		F O'Brien 0-2, N McSorley 0-2, D Larkin 0-1, A Cotter 0-1, J Horgan 0-1, R McCarthy 0-1.	Referee: J Kearney (Na Piarsaigh)

8 August 1992 Quarter-final	Mallow	1-10 - 0-10	Clyda Rovers	O'Connell Park
	R Sheehan 1-4, S Browne 0-2, J Walsh 0-2, M O'Donovan 0-1, K Mills 0-1.		F Dorgan 0-2, C O'Sullivan 0-2, A Looney 0-2, M O'Hanlon 0-1, T McGlinchey 0-1, M O'Shea 0-1, D Corbett 0-.	Referee: R Murphy (Lyre)

8 August 1992 Quarter-final	Kilmurry	3-12 - 0-08	Valley Rovers	Páirc Naomh Eoin
	TJ O'Lewary 2-2, G Lally 0-7, C Barry-Murphy 1-0, J Clifford 0-1, S Murphy 0-1, D Moss 0-1.		E McCarthy 0-3, D Kiely 0-2, D Callanan 0-1, J Shiels 0-1, A Crowley 0-1.	Referee: F Murphy (Newcestown)

9 August 1992 Quarter-final replay	Knocknagree	0-15 - 0-11	Ballincollig	Castle Grounds
	N O'Connor 0-3, P O'Connor 0-3, F O'Connor 0-2, A Cronin 0-2, D Guiney 0-1, J Buckley 0-1, D O'Connor 0-1, S Walsh 0-1, D Fitzgerald 0-1.		T O'Reilly 0-4, F Keohane 0-3, P O'Mahony 0-2, J Kelleher 0-1, T Hayes 0-1.	Referee: D Relihan (Castletownroche)

=== Semi-finals ===
29 August 1992 Semi-final	Mallow	0-08 - 0-06	St. Finbarr's	Ballyanly GAA Grounds
	R Sheehan 0-5, J Willis 0-1, J Walsh 0-1, S Browne 0-1.		S Bergin 0-2, S Ramsey 0-2, M Buckley 0-1, D Haines 0-1.	Referee: R O'Sullivan (Kilmurry)

30 August 1992 Semi-final	Kilmurry	3-11 - 0-04	Knocknagree	Mallow GAA Grounds
	C Barry-Murphy 1-3, G Lally 0-5, TJ O'Leary 1-1, J O'Leary 1-0, P O'Leary 0-1, Denis Moss 0-1.		Donal O'Connor 0-1, J Buckley 0-1, N O'Connor 0-1, P O'Connor 0-1.	Referee: DRelihan (Castletownroche)

=== Final ===
13 September 1992 Final	Mallow	1-13 - 2-09	Kilmurry	Páirc Uí Chaoimh
	S Browne 1-1, D O'Shea 0-4, R Sheehan 0-3, S Murphy 0-2, J Walsh 0-2, R Cunningham 0-1.		D O'Sullivan 1-3, G Lally 1-2, TJ O'Leary 0-3, J O'Leary 0-1.	Referee: S O'Keeffe (St. Michael's)

== Championship statistics ==
=== Top scorers ===
Overall

Rank	Player	Club	Tally	Total	Matches	Average
1	Ronan Sheehan	Mallow	2-15	21	4	5.25
2	Gabriel Lally	Kilmurry	1-14	17	3	5.66
3	T. J. O'Leary	Kilmurry	3-07	16	4	4.00
4	Tadhg O'Reilly	Ballincollig	2-08	14	3	4.66
5	Kieran Murphy	Castlemartyr	0-13	13	2	6.50
5	Podsie O'Mahony	Ballincollig	0-13	13	3	4.33
7	Con Barry-Murphy	Kilmurry	2-06	12	4	3.00
8	Niall O'Connor	Knocknagree	1-08	11	3	3.66
9	Éamonn McCarthy	Valley Rovers	0-10	10	2	5.00
10	John Buckley	Valley Rovers	2-03	9	4	2.25
10	Pat O'Connor	Knocknagree	1-06	9	3	3.00

In a single game

Rank	Player	Club	Tally	Total	Opposition
1	Podsie O'Mahony	Ballincollig	0-09	9	Naomh Abán
2	T. J. O'Leary	Kilmurry	2-02	8	Valley Rovers
2	Niall Corkery	Nemo Rangers	1-05	8	Knocknagree
2	Kieran Murphy	Castlemartyr	0-08	8	Delany Rovers
5	Kevin Harrington	Bantry Blues	1-04	7	Kilmurry
5	Niall O'Connor	Knocknagree	1-04	7	Nemo Rangers
5	Ronan Sheehan	Mallow	1-04	7	Clyda Rovers
5	Éamonn McCarthy	Valley Rovers	0-07	7	Newcestown
5	Gerry Casey	Rockchapel	0-07	7	Douglas
5	Gabriel Lally	Kilmurry	0-07	7	Valley Rovers
