= Danny Culloty =

Gaelic football player

Personal information
- Native name: Dónall Ó Collata (Irish)
- Nickname: The Yank
- Born: 15 March 1964 (age 62) San Francisco, California, U.S.
- Occupation: Sales rep
- Height: 6 ft 2 in (188 cm)

Sport
- Sport: Gaelic football
- Position: Midfield
Clubs
- Years: Club
- 1979-1982 1982-2002 1984-1999: Shannon Rangers; Newmarket; Duhallow
Club titles
- Cork titles: 2
Inter-county
- Years: County
- 1985-1996: Cork
Inter-county titles
- Munster titles: 7
- All-Irelands: 2
- NFL: 1

Danny Culloty (born 15 March 1964) is an Irish Gaelic football coach and former player. His league and championship career with the Cork senior team spanned twelve seasons from 1985 to 1996.

Born in San Francisco, Culloty played soccer, basketball and baseball while attending McAteer High School, before being introduced to Gaelic football by his father. He first appeared for the local Shannon Rangers senior team at the age of fifteen and won a number of championship medals. After returning to Ireland, Culloty joined the Newmarket club and was later included on the Duhallow divisional team. He won back-to-back county senior championship medals with Duhallow in 1990 and 1991. Culloty also won a county junior championship medal with Newmarket in 1998.

Culloty made his debut on the inter-county scene at the age of nineteen when he was selected for the under-21 team. He enjoyed three championship seasons with the under-21 team, winning back-to-back All-Ireland medals in 1984 and 1985. He also won an All-Ireland medal with the junior team in 1984. Culloty was subsequently added to the Cork senior panel and made his debut during the 1985 championship. Over the course of the next twelve seasons, he won back-to-back All-Ireland medals in 1989 and 1990. Culloty also won seven Munster medals and one National Football League medal. He played his last game for Cork in July 1996.

After being chosen on the Munster inter-provincial team for the first time in 1987, Culloty was a regular on the starting fifteen for a number of years. During that time he lost six Railway Cup finals.

In retirement from playing Culloty became involved in team management and coaching. In 2011 he managed Newmarket to the county premier intermediate championship title.

== Honours ==
=== Player ===
Newmarket

- Cork Junior Football Championship (1): 1998
- Duhallow Junior A Football Championship (2): 1993, 1998

Duhallow

- Cork Senior Football Championship (1): 1990, 1991 (c)

Cork

- All-Ireland Senior Football Championship (2): 1989, 1990
- Munster Senior Football Championship (7): 1987, 1988, 1989, 1990, 1993, 1994, 1995
- National Football League (1): 1988-89
- All-Ireland Junior Football Championship (1): 1984
- Munster Junior Football Championship (2): 1984, 1987
- All-Ireland Under-21 Football Championship (2): 1984, 1985
- Munster Under-21 Football Championship (2): 1984, 1985

=== Manager ===
Newmarket

- Cork Premier Intermediate Football Championship (1): 2011
