= 1993 All-Ireland Junior Football Championship =

All Ireland Champions
- Winners: Cork (10th win)
- Captain: Ronan Sheehan
- Manager: Paddy Sheehan

All Ireland Runners-up
- Runners-up: Laois
- Captain: Brian Keville
- Manager: Richie Connor

Provincial Champions
- Munster: Cork
- Leinster: Laois
- Ulster: Not Played
- Connacht: Mayo

The 1993 All-Ireland Junior Hurling Championship was the 63rd staging of the All-Ireland Junior Championship, the Gaelic Athletic Association's second tier Gaelic football championship.

Wexford entered the championship as the defending champions, however, they were beaten in the Leinster Championship.

The All-Ireland final was played on 25 July 1993 at Leahy Park in Cashel, between Cork and Laois, in what was their first ever meeting in the final. Cork won the match by 0–11 to 2–03 to claim their 10th championship title overall and a first title since 1990.

== Results ==
=== All-Ireland Junior Football Championship ===
==== All-Ireland semi-final ====
14 July 1993 Semi-final	Cork	0-15 - 0-07	Mayo	Cusack Park

==== All-Ireland final ====
25 July 1993 Final	Cork	0-11 - 2-03	Laois	Leahy Park
