= 2004 All-Ireland Under-21 Football Championship =

Gaelic football competition

Championship details

All-Ireland Champions
- Winning team: Armagh (1st win)
- Captain: Ciaran McKeever
- Manager: Peter Rafferty

All-Ireland Finalists
- Losing team: Mayo
- Manager: John Maughan

Provincial Champions
- Munster: Cork
- Leinster: Kildare
- Ulster: Armagh
- Connacht: Mayo

The 2004 All-Ireland Under-21 Football Championship was the 41st staging of the All-Ireland Under-21 Football Championship since its establishment by the Gaelic Athletic Association in 1964.

Dublin entered the championship as defending champions, however, they were defeated by Kildare in the Leinster final replay.

On 2 October 2004, Armagh won the championship following a 2–8 to 1–9 defeat of Mayo in the All-Ireland final. This was their first All-Ireland title.

== Results ==
=== All-Ireland Under-21 Football Championship ===
Semi-finals

| 5 September 2004 Semi-final | Mayo | 1-13 - 1-07 | Kildare | Pearse Stadium, Galway |

| 5 September 2004 Semi-final | Armagh | 1-19 - 2-10 | Cork | Pearse Stadium, Galway |

Final

| 2 October 2004 Final | Armagh | 2-08 - 1-09 | Mayo | Breffni Park, Cavan |

== Statistics ==
=== Miscellaneous ===
- The All-Ireland semi-final between Armagh and Cork is the first ever championship meeting between the two teams.
