= Ciarán O'Sullivan =

Gaelic football player

Personal information
- Native name: Ciarán Ó Súilleabháin (Irish)
- Born: 5 July 1970 (age 56) Urhan, County Cork, Ireland
- Occupation: Oil company owner
- Height: 6 ft 1 in (185 cm)

Sport
- Sport: Gaelic football
- Position: Right wing-back
Clubs
Years	Club	Apps (scores)
	Urhan; Beara	51 059
Club titles
- Cork titles: 1
Inter-county
- Years: County
- 1992-2005: Cork
Inter-county titles
- Munster titles: 5
- All-Irelands: 0
- NFL: 1
- All Stars: 1

Ciarán O'Sullivan (born 5 July 1970) is an Irish Gaelic football selector and former player. His championship career with the Cork senior team spanned fourteen seasons from 1992 until 2005.

O'Sullivan made his debut on the inter-county scene at the age of seventeen when he was selected for the Cork minor team. He enjoyed one unsuccessful championship season with the minor team before playing with the under-21 side for three seasons. By this stage he had also joined the junior team, winning an All-Ireland medal in 1990. O'Sullivan joined the Cork senior team during the 1992 championship. Over the course of the following fourteen seasons he won five Munster medals and one National Football League medal. An All-Ireland runner-up on two occasions, O'Sullivan retired from inter-county football in 2004.

== Honours ==
Beara

- Cork Senior Football Championship (1): 1997

Urhan

- Beara Junior Football Championship (): 1987, 1988, 1990, 1991, 1992, 2007, 2008, 2010, 2011,

Cork

- Munster Senior Football Championship (5): 1993, 1994, 1995, 1999, 2002
- National Football League (1): 1998-99
