= Dohenys GAA =

Gaelic sports club in Cork, Ireland

Dohenys
- Na Dubhchonnaigh
- Founded: 1886
- County: Cork
- Colours
- Grounds: Sam Maguire Park
- Coordinates: 51°42′52.81″N 9°06′34.87″W

Playing kits
Standard colours

Senior Club Championships
	All Ireland	Munster champions	Cork champions
Football:	0	0	1

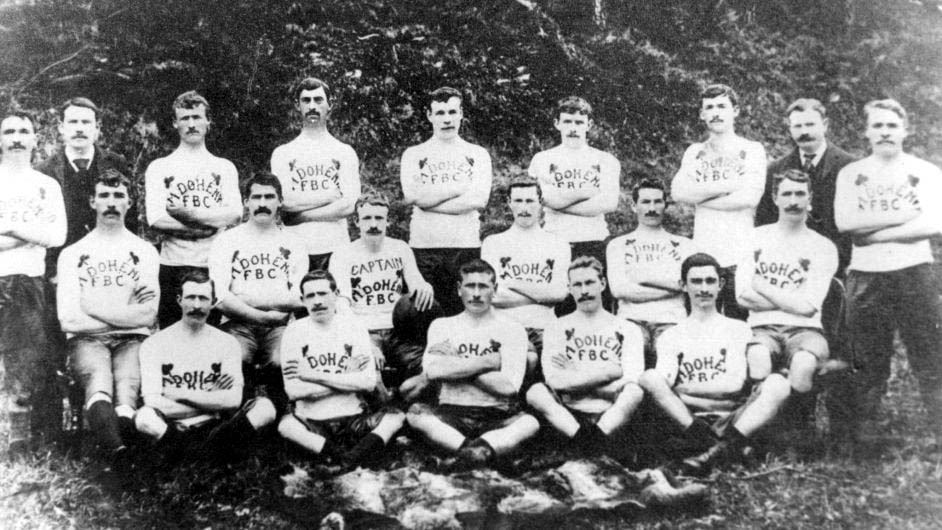
Dohenys football team of 1897, Cork champions

Dohenys GAA is a Gaelic Athletic Association club in Dunmanway, County Cork, Ireland. The club is affiliated to the Carbery Board and the Cork County Board and fields teams in both hurling and Gaelic football.

== History ==
Located in the town of Dunmanway, Michael Doheny Football Club was founded in 1886. The club was named in honour of the Tipperary Young Irelander, Michael Doheny, who spent a short time in Dunmanway when on "the run" in 1847. Representatives from the club attended the inaugural meeting of the Cork County Board and Dohenys became the first affiliated club in West Cork.

Dohenys had their first title success in 1897, when the club claimed the Cork SFC title after a 0–05 to 0–04 win over Kanturk in a final replay. The club subsequently represented Cork in the inter-county series and won the Munster SFC after a two-point win over Limerick. Dohenys were later beaten by Dublin representatives Kickhams in the 1897 All-Ireland SFC final.

Dohenys spent the majority of the 20th century operating in the junior ranks and won 10 West Cork JFC titles between 1927 and 1966. Two Cork JFC titles were claimed during this time. Dohenys returned to the senior ranks after winning the Cork IFC title in October 1972, following a 4–10 to 1–07 win over Glanworth in the final. After winning a third Cork JAFC title in 1993, Dohenys claimed their second Cork IFC title two years later. As a dual club, Dohenys won their fourth West Cork JAHC in 2013.

== Grounds ==
The club's home ground is Sam Maguire Park. It is named in honour of Irish republican Sam Maguire, who served as chairman of the London County Board. While a dedicated field was purchased and had been in use since 1938, the official opening by GAA president Donal Keenan took place on 21 April 1974 and featured a Gaelic football match between Cork and Kerry.

== Honours ==
- Munster Senior Football Championship (1): 1897
- Cork Senior Football Championship (1): 1897
- Cork Intermediate Football Championship (2): 1972, 1995
- Cork Junior A Football Championship (3) 1935, 1966, 1993
- West Cork Junior A Football Championship (12): 1927, 1931, 1935, 1956, 1957, 1958, 1959, 1962, 1965, 1966, 1992, 1993
- West Cork Junior A Hurling Championship (4): 1958, 1959, 1963, 2013
- Cork Junior B Hurling Championship (1): 2006
- West Cork Junior B Football Championship (1): 2015
- West Cork Junior B Hurling Championship (2): 1996, 1998
- West Cork Junior C Football Championship (5): 1977, 1978, 1979, 1986, 1987
- West Cork Junior D Football Championship (1): 1998
- West Cork Under-21 Football Championship (5): 1969, 1970, 1971, 2000, 2017
- West Cork Under-21 B Hurling Championship (2): 1995, 2008
- Cork Premier 2 Minor Football Championship (1): 2010
- West Cork Minor A Hurling Championship (1): 1956
- West Cork Minor A Football Championship (6): 1942, 1944, 1978, 1998, 1999, 2003
- Cork Minor B Hurling Championship (1): 2001
- West Cork Minor B Hurling Championship (5): 1990, 1994, 1996, 2003, 2009

== Notable players ==
- Éamonn Young: All-Ireland SFC-winner (1945)
- Jack Young: All-Ireland SFC-winner (1911)
- Jim Young: All-Ireland SHC-winner (1941, 1942, 1943, 1944, 1946)
