= Newmarket GAA =

Gaelic games club in County Cork, Ireland

Newmarket
- Áth Trasna
- Founded: 1897
- County: Cork
- Nickname: Duhallow Devils
- Colours
- Grounds: Priory Park
- Coordinates: 52°12′48″N 8°58′58″W

Playing kits
Standard colours

Newmarket GAA is a Gaelic Athletic Association club located in Newmarket, County Cork, Ireland. The club is affiliated to the Duhallow Board and the Cork County Board and fields teams in both hurling and Gaelic football.

== History ==
Located in the town of Newmarket, about 60 km northwest of Cork, Newmarket GAA Club first entered a Gaelic football team in the Cork SFC in 1897. The club fielded teams in the competition at various times over the following three years, however, in 1927 a serious effort was made to reorganise the club.

Newmarket was one of the first clubs to affiliate to the newly established Duhallow Board in 1933. Since then, the club has spent the majority of its existence operating in the junior grades in both codes. Newmarket went on to become one of the most dominant hurling teams in the division and has won 17 Duhallow JAHC titles between 1934 and 2025. The club also won eight Duhallow JAFC titles during this time.

Newmarket won the Cork JFC for the first time in 1970, following a 1–09 to 2–04 win over Adrigole in the final. The club claimed a second title in that grade in 1998 with a one-point win over Killavullen. The 21st century saw Newmarket return to the senior ranks, with Cork PIFC title wins in 2011 and 2021.

== Honours ==
- Cork Premier Intermediate Football Championship (2): 2011, 2021
- Cork Junior A Football Championship (2): 1970, 1998
- Duhallow Junior A Football Championship (8): 1949, 1950, 1965, 1968, 1969, 1970, 1993, 1998
- Duhallow Junior A Hurling Championship (18): 1934, 1935, 1936, 1937, 1942, 1946, 1947, 1948, 1950, 1964, 1974, 1975, 1976, 1979, 2019, 2023, 2025, 2026
- Duhallow Junior B Hurling Championship (6): 1962, 2017, 2018, 2020, 2023, 2025

== Notable players ==
- Jerry Cronin: All-Ireland SHC-winner (1977, 1978)
- Danny Culloty: All-Ireland SFC-winner (1989, 1990)
- Mark O'Sullivan: All-Ireland SFC runner-up (1999)
