= Scanlan =

Scanlan may refer to:

== Surnames ==
- Scanlan (surname), including a list of people with the name
- Mac Scannláin
- Ó Scannláin
- Ó Scannail
- Ó Scealláin

== Other uses ==
- Monsignor Scanlan High School
- Scanlan's Monthly
- Scanlan SG-1A, glider
- Scanlan Shorthalt, a gnome bard in the D&D Web Series Critical Role

== See also ==
- Scanlon (disambiguation)
- Patrick O'Scanlan
