= Mac Scannláin =

Mac Scannláin is the name of a family that originated in what is now County Louth in Ireland. Ballymascanlan, near Dundalk, is named after them. The name rarely bears the prefix nowadays, and is usually rendered Scallan, Scanlan or Scanlon.

It is a variant of the name Ó Scannail derived from the Irish word scannal, originally meaning quarrel, contention, fight, and later, scandal.

There are three quite distinct septs or clans, the first and primary sept being the Ó Scannail (Scannell) (originally Scannal), who belong to West Munster and specifically the Counties of Kerry, Cork, and Limerick. The other two septs derived from Ó Scannail, and their descendants are now known as Scanlan and Scanlon. One sept is O'Scannlain of Munster and the other is MacScannláin of Oriel, County Louth, neither of which has retained the prefix 0 or Mc in modern times. The widespread distribution of these names is indicated by the fact that there are six Ballyscanlans in Ireland as well as a Scanlansland and a Scanlan's Island. Two of these are in County Clare and one in Mayo, which lends colour to the statement that there was also a North Connacht Sept of O'Scanlan.

== See also ==
- Ó Scannláin
- Ó Scannail
- Scannell
- Ó Scealláin
