= John Scanlan =

John Scanlan may refer to:

- John Joseph Scanlan (1906–1997), second Bishop of the Roman Catholic Diocese of Honolulu in the United States
- John Joseph Scanlan (soldier) (1890–1962), Australian Army officer
- Seán Scanlan, also known as John O. Scanlan (1937-2017), Irish electrical engineer
