= Scanlan (surname) =

Scanlan is an Irish surname that derives from the Irish Gaelic name Ó Scannláin, meaning descendant of Scannlán’. Notable people with the surname include:

- Emmett J. Scanlan (born 1979), Irish actor
- Fred Scanlan (1877–1950), Canadian ice hockey player
- Jerry Scanlan (born 1957) retired American football player
- Joanna Scanlan (born 1961), English actress and television writer
- John Joseph Scanlan (1906–1997), second Bishop of the Roman Catholic Diocese of Honolulu
- Joseph Lawrence Scanlan (born 1929), American television director
- Julian Scanlan (born 1997), American DJ
- Justin Scanlan (born 1975), Irish Australian community leader and disability advocate
- Laetisha Scanlan (born 1990), Australian sport shooter
- Luke Scanlan (1841–1915), American politician and farmer
- Michael Scanlan (disambiguation)
- Neal Scanlan (born 1961), British special effects artist
- Patricia Scanlan (born 1956), Irish novelist
- Reggie Scanlan, bass guitar player from New Orleans, Louisiana
- Robert Richard Scanlan (1801–1876), Irish painter
- Sean Scanlan (1948–2017), Scottish actor
- Seán Scanlan (1937–2017), Irish pioneer in circuits & systems theory, electronic engineering professor
- Teresa Scanlan (1993), Irish American former Miss America and business lawyer
- Thomas Scanlan (1874–1930), Irish politician
- Toni Scanlan (born 1956), Australian actress
- Tuna Scanlan, Samoan/New Zealand boxer of the 1950s and '60s
- Walter Scanlan, stage name of Walter Van Brunt (1892–1971), American tenor
- William J. Scanlan (1934–2014), musical theatre performer and composer

Fictional characters:

- Mike Scanlan, a character in Arthur Conan Doyle's The Valley of Fear

== See also ==
- Scanlan (disambiguation)
- Scanlon, a surname
