= Scanlen =

Scanlen is a surname. Notable people with the surname include:

- Eliza Scanlen (born 1999), Australian actress
- Thomas Charles Scanlen (1834–1912), South African politician

== See also ==
- Scanlan (disambiguation)
- Scanlon, surname
