= Ó Scannláin =

Ó Scannláin is the name of a number of Gaelic-Irish families, all unrelated. The most noteworthy were located in Munster. Nowadays rendered Scanlan, or Scanlon.

In The Book of Munster Scannláin mac Eochaidh mac Ailghile mac Toirdhealbhach (a quo Uí Thoirdhealbhach) is given as the ancestor of the Uí Scannláin and other septs, it is possible this is the origin of the family in Clare. This would make the family a sept of the Dál gCais.

== See also ==
- Mac Scannláin
- Ó Scannail
- Ó Scealláin
