= Scanlon =

Scanlon is an Anglicized form of the Irish Gaelic name Ó Scannláin, meaning "descendant of Scannlán", and is a variant of the name Ó Scannail derived from the Irish word scannal, originally meaning quarrel, contention, fight, and later, scandal.

There are three quite distinct septs or clans, the first and primary sept being the Ó Scannail (Scannell) (originally Scannal), who belong to West Munster and specifically the Counties of Kerry, Cork, and Limerick. The other two septs derived from Ó Scannail, and their descendants are now known as Scanlan and Scanlon. One sept is O'Scannlain of Munster and the other is McScannlain of Oriel, County Louth, neither of which has retained the prefix O or Mc in modern times. The latter are perpetuated in the placename Ballymacscanlon near Dundalk. The widespread distribution of these names is indicated by the fact that there are six Ballyscanlans in Ireland as well as a Scanlansland and a Scanlan's Island. Two of these are in County Clare and one in Mayo, which lends colour to the statement that there was also a North Connacht Sept of O'Scanlan.

Notable people with the name include:

- Agnes Scanlon (1923–2018), American politician
- Albert Scanlon (1935–2009), English soccer player
- Angela Scanlon (born 1983), Irish broadcaster
- Arthur Garrett Scanlon (a.k.a. Butch Scanlon) (1890–1945), American football coach
- Bill Scanlon (1956–2021), American tennis player
- Bridget Scanlon (born 1959), Irish-American hydrogeologist
- Christopher Scanlon (born 1981), American politician
- Craig Scanlon (born 1960), British musician
- Dan Scanlon (born 1976), American animator, writer and storyboard artist
- Denis Scanlon (born 1954), Australian rules footballer
- Dewey Scanlon (1899–1944), American football coach
- Eamon Scanlon (born 1954), Irish politician
- Edward Scanlon (1890–fl.1914), English footballer
- Eugene Scanlon (1924–1994), American politician
- Eugene Scanlon Jr., American judge
- Hugh Scanlon (1913–2004), Australian-born British trade unionist
- Ian Scanlon (born 1952), Scottish soccer player
- Jack Scanlon (born 1998), British actor
- Jack Scanlon (footballer) (1911–1972), Australian rules footballer
- James Scanlon (born 1948), Australian equestrian
- Joseph Scanlon (1924–1970), American politician
- Joseph A. Scanlon (1901–1957), American politician
- Larimar Fiallo Scanlón (born 1983), Dominican beauty contestant
- Kyla Scanlon (born 1997), American content creator
- Leo Scanlon, American amateur astronomer for whom 8131 Scanlon is named
- Mark Scanlon (disambiguation), multiple people
- Martin F. Scanlon (1889–1980), United States Air Force general
- Mary Scanlon (disambiguation), multiple people
- Michael Scanlon, American lobbyist
- Michael Scanlon (baseball) (1843–1929), Irish-born American baseball manager
- Michael Scanlon (poet) (1833–1917), Irish poet and statistician
- Pat Scanlon (outfielder) (1861–1913), American baseball player
- Pat Scanlon (third baseman) (born 1952), American baseball player
- Pauline Scanlon, Irish singer
- Peter Scanlon (disambiguation), multiple people
- Phil Scanlon (born 1976), British musician
- Rich Scanlon (born 1980), American football player
- Séamus Scanlon (born 1981), Irish Gaelic footballer
- T. M. Scanlon (born 1940), American philosophy professor
- Terry Scanlon (1913–1996), Australian comedian and pantomime artist
- Thomas E. Scanlon (1896–1955), American politician
- Walter J. Scanlon, alias of Walter Van Brunt (1892–1971), American singer

== See also ==
- Scanlan (disambiguation)
- Scanlen
- Scanlon (disambiguation)
- Scannell
- Ó Scannail
