= 1932 Cork Senior Football Championship =

Gaelic football competition

- Dates: 20 March – 18 September 1932
- Teams: 13
- Champions: Beara (1st title); D. O'Sullivan (captain)
- Runners-up: Clonakilty; Dan Burke (captain)

Tournament statistics
- Matches played: 12
- Goals scored: 37 (3.08 per match)
- Points scored: 74 (6.17 per match)

The 1932 Cork Senior Football Championship was the 44th staging of the Cork Senior Football Championship since its establishment by the Cork County Board in 1887. The draw for the first round fixtures took place on 31 January 1932. The championship ran from 20 March to 18 September 1932.

Macroom were the defending champions, however, they were beaten by Beara in the second round.

The final was played on 18 September 1932 at the Mardyke in Cork, between Beara and Clonakilty, in what was their first ever meeting in the final. Beara won the match by 2–02 to 1–01 to claim their first ever championship title.

== Results ==
=== First round ===
20 March 1932 First round	St Finbarr's	0-00 - 0-04	Clonakilty	Upton Grounds

20 March 1932 First round	Na Deasúnaigh	7-04 - 2-04	University College Cork	The Mardyke

27 March 1932 First round	Nils	0-01 - 3-07	Collins	Cork Athletic Grounds

3 April 1932 First round	Imokilly	2-07 - 2-01	Carbery	The Mardyke

10 April 1932 First round	Macroom	1-03 - 0-02	Muskerry	Crookstown Grounds

29 May 1932 First round	Beara	3-04 - 0-00	Seandún	Bantry Grounds

- Avondhu received a bye in this round.

=== Second round ===
8 May 1932 Second round	Na Deasúnaigh	1-02 - 4-04	Carbery	Bandon Grounds

12 June 1932 Second round	Avondhu	2-03 - 2-04	Clonakilty	Cork Athletic Grounds

3 July 1932 Second round	Beara	2-03 - 0-01	Macroom	Bantry Grounds

- Collins received a bye in this round.

=== Semi-finals ===
24 July 1932 Semi-final	Clonakilty	0-10 - 1-03	Collins	Enniskeane Grounds

14 August 1932 Semi-final	Beara	2-02 - 0-02	Carbery	Castletownbere Grounds

=== Final ===
18 September 1932 Final	Beara	2-02 - 1-01	Clonakilty	The Mardyke
				Referee: D Looney (Macroom)

== Championship statistics ==
=== Miscellaneous ===
- Beara became the first division to win the title.
- Clonakilty qualify for the final for the first time.
