= Ó Scealláin =

Ó Scealláin is an Irish surname, originally from County Wexford, derived from a word meaning kernel. It is nowadays rendered as Scallan. Notable people with the surname include:

- Éamonn Scallan (born 1972), Irish Curling coach
- Frank Clinger Scallan (1870–1950), Anglo-Indian artist and writer

== See also ==
- Mac Scannláin
- Ó Scannláin
- Ó Scannail
