= 2026 Cork Premier Senior Football Championship =

Annual hurling competition season

- Dates: 7 April – 25 October 2026
- Teams: 12 clubs 8 divisions 2 universities
- Sponsor: McCarthy Insurance Group
- Champions: Nemo Rangers (24th title); Stephen Cronin (captain); Robbie O'Dwyer (manager)
- Runners-up: Sr Finbarr's; Steven Sherlock (captain); Brian Roche (manager)
- Relegated: St Michael's

Tournament statistics
- Matches played: 32
- Goals scored: 91 (2.84 per match)
- Points scored: 893 (27.91 per match)
- Top scorer: Steven Sherlock (2-29)

The 2026 Cork Premier Senior Football Championship was the seventh staging of the Cork Premier Senior Football Championship and the 138th staging overall of a championship for the top-ranking Gaelic football teams in Cork. The draw for the group stage placings took place on 9 December 2025. The championship ran from 7 April to 25 October 2026.

St Finbarr's were the defending champions. St Michael's were relegated, thus bringing an end to four years of top tier Gaelic football for the club.

The final was played on 25 October 2026 at SuperValu Páirc Uí Chaoimh in Cork, between Nemo Rangers and St Finbarr's, in what was their sixth meeting in the final overall and a second consecutive meeting. Nemo Rangers won the match by 1-19 to 2-12 to claim their 24th championship title overall and a first title in four years.

Steven Sherlock was the championship's top scorer with 2-29.

== Team changes ==
=== To Championship ===
Promoted from the Cork Senior A Football Championship

- Knocknagree

=== From Championship ===
Relegated to the Cork Senior A Football Championship

- Carbery Rangers

== Group 1 ==
=== Group 1 table ===
Semi-finalist Quarter-finalist

Team	Matches				Score			Pts
Team	Pld	W	D	L	For	Against	Diff	Pts
Carrigaline	3	3	0	0	61	50	11	6
St Finbarr's	3	1	0	2	63	55	8	2
Mallow	3	1	0	2	46	55	-9	2
Douglas	3	1	0	2	51	61	-10	2

=== Group 1 results ===
24 July 2026 Round 1	St Finbarr's	2-15 - 1-20	Carrigaline	Ballinhassig Grounds
	S Sherlock (0-6, 2tp frees, tp); B Hayes (1-3, tp); T Egan (1-0); C Myers Murray (0-2); E Dennehy, B O’Connell, R Barrett (mark), W Buckley (0-1 each).	Report	É Desmond (0-8, 0-6, tp); B Coakley (0-4, 2tp frees); K McCarthy (1-0); N Coakley (free), B O’Driscoll (0-3 each); C Barrett, K O’Reilly (0-1 each).

25 July 2026 Round 1	Mallow	0-14 - 4-10	Douglas	Grenagh Grounds
	K Sheehan 0-4 (1 tp, 0-2 f), M Tobin, S McDonnell (0-1 f) 0-3 each, J Dillon (tp), C Mullins 0-2 each.	Report	S Coakley 2-4 (2 tp, 1-0 pen), L Dwan Fogarty, A Cantwell 1-0 each, S Kingston 0-3 (1 tp), D Ward 0-2, C Russell 0-1.

14 August 2026 Round 2	Douglas	1-11 - 3-16	St Finbarr's	Páirc Uí Rinn
	S Kingston 0-4 (1 2pt), J Mouret 1-0, D Ward, S Coakley (0-1 f) 0-2 each, J Burke, C Russell (0-1 f), A Cantwell 0-1 each.	Report	S Sherlock 1-6 (0-3 f), B Hayes 1-2, T Egan 1-0, R Barrett 0-3, W Buckley, I Maguire 0-2 each, C Myers-Murray 0-1.

16 August 2026 Round 2	Carrigaline	0-16 - 0-14	Mallow	Páirc Uí Rinn
	E Desmond 0‑5 (2 2pt), J McCarthy 0‑3, B Coakley (1 2pt f), K O’Reilly, N Coakley (0‑2 f) 0‑2 each, S Andrews, D Griffin 0‑1 each.	Report	S McDonnell 0‑7 (2 2pt f, 0‑2 f), S Merritt (1 2pt, 0‑1 45), M Tobin 0‑3 each, J Dillon 0‑1.

13 September 2026 Round 3	Carrigaline	0-22 - 1-12	Douglas	Ted Hanley Memorial Park
	B Coakley (0-9, tp, 3 tp frees); K O'Reilly (tp), J McCarthy (0-3 each); B O'Driscoll (tp), N Coakley (free), E Desmond (0-2 each); D Greene (0-1).	Report	C Russell (0-5, tp, 0-1 free); J Burke (1-0); D Ward (tp), S Coakley (0-2 frees), A Cantwell (0-2 each); S Kingston (0-1).

13 September 2026 Round 3	St Finbarr's	2-11 - 1-15	Mallow	Moore Park
	S Sherlock (1-3, 0-1 free), W Buckley (1-2, 1 2pt), R Barrett (0-4), B O’Connell and J Wigginton Barrett (0-1 each).	Report	S McDonnell (1-3, 0-2 frees), M O’Rourke (0-4, 1 2pt), M Tobin (0-4, 0-1 free), P Britton (0-2), S Copps and K Sheehan (free) (0-1 each).

== Group 2 ==
=== Group 2 table ===
Quarter-finalist Relegation playoff

Team	Matches				Score			Pts
Team	Pld	W	D	L	For	Against	Diff	Pts
Nemo Rangers	3	2	0	1	57	43	14	4
Newcestown	3	2	0	1	56	45	11	4
Valley Rovers	3	2	0	1	34	43	-9	4
St Michael's (R)	3	0	0	3	34	50	-16	0

=== Group 2 results ===
25 July 2026 Round 1	Newcestown	2-16 - 1-13	Nemo Rangers	Cloughduv Grounds
	S O’Sullivan 0-7 (2 2pt), J Meade 1-2, D Buckley 0-4 (1 2pt f, 0-1 f), E Collins 1-1, M McSweeney, L Meade 0-1 each.	Report	R Corkery 0-5 (1 2pt), M Cronin 0-3 (1 2pt, 0-1 f), A O’Donovan 1-0, C Horgan 0-2 (0-1 f), K Fulignati, B Murphy, C Shalloe 0-1 each.

26 July 2026 Round 1	St Michael's	1-05 - 1-07	Valley Rovers	Ted Hanley Memorial Park
	F Leahy 1-0, A Murphy (1 2pt), E Buckley 0-2 each, L O’Herlihy 0-1 (0-1 f).	Report	S Ryan 1-0, E Delaney (1 2pt), B Curtin (0-1 45, 0-1 f) 0-2 each, F Lynch (0-1 f), A Walsh-Murphy (0-1 f), J Walsh 0-1 each.

15 August 2026 Round 2	Valley Rovers	1-16 - 3-09	Newcestown	Coachford Sportsfield
	F Lynch 0-5 (1 2pt f, 1 2pt), S Ryan 1-1, A Walsh-Murphy 0-3 (0-3 f), E Guinane, J O’Driscoll (1 2pt), J Walsh 0-2 each, W Hurley 0-1.	Report	D Buckley 0-7 (2 2pt f), J Meade 1-1, N Kelly, L Meade 1-0 each, E Collins 0-1.

16 August 2026 Round 2	Nemo Rangers	1-21 - 2-10	St Michael's	Páirc Uí Rinn
	R Corkery (0-9, 0-3 frees, 1 2pt), L Horgan (1-1), K O’Donovan (0-4), B Hayes (0-3), A O’Donovan, B Murphy, R Dalton and C Moore (0-1 each).	Report	A Hennessey (1-2, 2pt), L O’Herlihy (0-5, 0-2 frees, 0-1 2pt free), J Ryan (1-0), R Kavanagh (0-2), F Leahy (0-1).

13 September 2026 Round 3	Nemo Rangers	1-14 - 0-05	Valley Rovers	Páirc Dhónaill Uí Cheallacháin
	R Corkery 0-5 (1-2pt, 0-2f), R Dalton 1-1, D O’Sullivan 0-3, K O’Donovan 0-2, C Shalloe, L Horgan, M Hill (0-1 each).	Report	E Guinane 0-3, A Walsh-Murphy, F Lynch (0-1 each).

13 September 2026 Round 3	Newcestown	0-16 - 0-10	St Michael's	Ballymartle Grounds
	D Buckley 0-4 (0-3f), N Kelly, L Meade, J Meade, C Dinneen (2pt) 0-2 each, J Kelleher, C O’Donovan, T Twomey, H Canty 0-1 each.	Report	J Ryan 0-3 (0-2f), L O’Sullivan (0-1f), R O’Shaughnessy 0-2 each, R Kavanagh, A Hennessy, E Hegarty 0-1 each.

== Group 3 ==
=== Group 3 table ===
Quarter-finalist Relegation playoff

Team	Matches				Score			Pts
Team	Pld	W	D	L	For	Against	Diff	Pts
Clonakilty	3	2	1	0	67	36	31	5
Castlehaven	3	2	1	0	61	56	5	5
Knocknagree	3	1	0	2	59	58	1	2
Ballincollig	3	0	0	3	40	77	-37	0

=== Group 3 results ===
25 July 2026 Round 1	Knocknagree	0-13 - 1-18	Clonakilty	Carrigadrohid Grounds
	M McSweeney 0-3 (1 2pt), D O’Connor (1 2pt), D Twomey, G Looney 0-2 each, P Doyle (45), E McSweeney, D R O’Connor, F O’Connor 0-1 each.	Report	C Daly 1-5 (1 2pt), D Ó Sé 0-5 (0-1 f), D Gough, R Mannix 0-3 each, M Shanley, C Kenneally 0-1 each.

26 July 2026 Round 1	Castlehaven	0-22 - 3-10	Ballincollig	Ahamailla GAA Complex
	B Hurley 0-6 (1 2pt, 0-1 f), M Maguire 0-5, M Collins, D Cahalane (1 2pt), M Hurley, C Cahalane 0-2 each, R Maguire, D O’Donovan, J O’Driscoll 0-1 each.	Report	C Ahern 1-1, D Dorgan 0-3 (1 2pt, 0-1 f), D Miskella 0-2 f, T O’Connell, D O’Shea 1-0 each, C Kiely, C Dalton, JP Murphy, S O’Neill 0-1 each.

16 August 2026 Round 2	Clonakilty	1-12 - 1-12	Castlehaven	Rosscarbery Grounds
	C Daly 0-4 (1 2pt, 0-1 f),C Kenneally 1-1, T Clancy 0-2, D Gough (0-1 f), D Kenneally, M Shanley, R Mannix, D Ó Sé 0-1 each.	Report	B Hurley 0-5 (1 2pt f, 0-3 f), C Cahalane 0-3, A Whelton 1-0, M Collins 0-2, M Hurley, J O’Driscoll 0-1 each.

16 August 2026 Round 2	Ballincollig	0-13 - 2-18	Knocknagree	Castle Grounds
	D O’Mahony, L Fahy 0-4 (1 2pt) each, D Miskella 0-3 each, H Aherne, D Dorgan 0-1 each.	Report	F O’Connor 1-4 (0-3f), Denis R O’Connor 0-5 (1 2pt), M McSweeney, G Looney 0-4 (1 2pt) each, David O’Connor 1-0, M Dilworth 0-1.

13 September 2026 Round 3	Ballincollig	0-08 - 3-22	Clonakilty	Kilmurry Grounds
	D Dorgan 0-6 (0-1 f, 2 2pt), R Noonan, D O’Mahony 0-1 each.	Report	S McEvoy 2-4, R Mannix 1-2, D Kenneally, S White (1 2ptr), D Ó Se 0-3 each, T Clancy 0-2 (1 2 ptr), M Shanley, C Daly, C Kenneally, D Gough, M White (45) 0-1 each.

13 September 2026 Round 3	Castlehaven	2-18 - 4-10	Knocknagree	Páirc Uí Rinn
	C Cahalane 1-5, B Hurley 0-5 (1 2pt f, 0-2 f), M Maguire 0-3, S Browne 1-0, Damien Cahalane (1 2pt), M Hurley 0-2 each, C Maguire 0-1.	Report	F O’Connor 1-3 (0-1 f), A O’Connor 1-1, Denis R O’Connor 0-3 (1 2pt), D O’Mahony, D Mahoney 1-0 each, P Doyle 0-2 (0-2 45), E McSweeney 0-1.

== Division/colleges section ==
=== Divisions/colleges section round 1 ===
7 April 2026 Round 1	Seandún	3-14 - 3-17	Avondhu	O'Connell Memorial Park
	B Murphy 1-9 (1-0 pen, 2 2pt f, 1 2pt), D Lynch (0-1 f), B Galvin 1-2 each, A West 0-1.	Report	M Lenahan 2-4 (1 2pt), C Hanlon 1-4 (0-1 f), D Hanlon, B Twomey 0-3 each, M O’Neill, C O’Brien, K Lenahan 0-1 each.	Referee: R Whelan (Aghada)

7 April 2026 Round 1	MTU Cork	0-05 - 0-16	Imokilly	Páirc Séamus de Barra
	C Twohig 0-3 (0-2 f), S O’Sullivan (0-1 f), M O’Donovan 0-1 each	Report	D Murnane 0-9 (1 2ptf, 0-3 f), K O’Shea 0-2, D Kearney, C O’Leary, T O’Donovan, S McSharry, S Cummins 0-1 each.	Referee: B Crowley (Castlehaven)

=== Divisions/colleges section round 2 ===
14 April 2026 Round 2	Beara	1-07 - 3-05	Avondhu	Éire Óg Grounds
	F Fenner 1-3 (1 2pt f, 1-0 pen, 0-1 f), T Murphy, B O‘Sullivan, J Spencer, A Elphick 0-1 each.	Report	B Twomey 2-1, M Lenahan 0-3 (1 2pt), C Hanlon 1-0, D Hanlon 0-1.	Referee: A O’Connor (Ballygarvan)

=== Divisions/colleges section round 3 ===
21 April 2026 Round 3	Avondhu	1-16 - 1-06	Imokilly	O'Connell Memorial Park
	B Twomey 1-3 (0-1 f), M Lenahan 0-5 (1 2pt), C Hanlon 0-4 (0-2 f), D Hanlon 0-2, K Lenahan, G Lardner 0-1 each.	Report	C O’Leary 1-1, D Murnane 0-3 (1 2pt f, 0-1 f), M O’Rourke, S McSharry 0-1 each.	Referee: J Kelleher (St John's)

=== Divisions/colleges section semi-finals ===
30 June 2026 Semi-final	Duhallow	1-23 - 3-18	Carbery	Páirc Uí Rinn
	L Murphy 1-12 (3 2pts, 3f); D O’Connor 0-8 (3 2pts); K Crowley, S Hickey, and H Linehan 0-1 each.	Report	D Gore 0-9 (2 2pts); O O’Donovan 2-2, R O’Donovan 0-4 (1 2pt), R Deane 1-0; O Corcoran 0-2, L Hourihane 0-1.

7 July 2026 Semi-final	Avondhu	3-12 - 3-17	Muskerry	Castle Grounds
	D Hanlon (1 2pt, 1-0 pen), M Lenahan 1-2 each, C Hanlon 0-4 (0-2 f, 1 2pt), B Twomey 1-1, O O’Callaghan, A Trimm, K Crowley 0-1 each.	Report	C Dodd 1-5 (2 2pt), L Twohig 0-5 (0-1 f), J Kelleher 1-1, L O’Connor 0-3 (0-1 f), E O’Leary 1-0, M O’Brien 0-2, I Jones 0-1.

=== Divisions/colleges section final ===
10 July 2026 Final	Carbery	2-23 - 2-15	Muskerry	Páirc Uí Rinn
	R O’Donovan 0-7 (1 2pt, 1 2pt f, 0-1 f), A Hayes 1-1, D Gore (1 2pt), O Corcoran 0-4 each, L Shorten, O O’Donovan 0-2 each, R Deane, L Hourihan, K O’Driscoll 0-1 each.	Report	S O’Hanlon 1-2, L Twohig 0-4 (1 2pt, 0-2 f), E O’Leary 0-3, I Jones 1-0, L O’Connor, J Kelleher 0-2 each, S Dornan, C Donovan 0-1 each.

== Relegation stage ==
=== Relegation final ===
26 September 2026 Relegation final	Ballincollig	4-14 - 0-10	St Michael's	Éire Óg Grounds
	D O’Mahony and D Miskella (1-0 pen) (1-3 each), D Dorgan (1-1, 0-1 free), D O’Leary (1-0), C Dorgan (0-1 free), B O’Connell and S Kiely (0-2 each), L Fahy (0-1).	Report	L O’Herlihy (0-4, 1 2pt free, 0-1 free), R Cotter (0-2), R Kavanagh, E De Burca (free), J Ryan (free) and D Meaney (0-1 each).

== Knockout stage ==
=== Preliminary quarter-final ===
9 August 2026 Preliminary quarter-final	Carbery	w/o - scr.	University College Cork	Éire Óg Grounds

=== Quarter-finals ===
26 September 2026 Quarter-final	Clonakilty	1-17 - 2-13	Newcestown	Sam Maguire Park
	S White, D Ó Sé (0-1 f), C Kenneally 0-3 each, D Harrington 1-0, C Daly, M White (1 2pt f), T Clancy 0-2 each, D Gough, S McEvoy 0-1 each.	Report	S O’Sullivan 1-4, D Buckley 0-5 (0-3 f, 1 2pt), E Collins 1-1, S O’Donovan, L Meade, H Canty 0-1 each.

27 September 2026 Quarter-final	St Finbarr's	4-22 - 1-11	Carbery	Ahamilla GAA Complex
	S Sherlock 0-8 (1 2pt, 0-1f), J Wigginton Barrett 1-3, I Maguire 1-2 (2pt), E Dennehy 1-1, L Hannigan 1-0, B Hayes, W Buckley 0-2 each, C Myers Murray, B O’Connell, R Barrett 0-1 each.	Report	R O’Donovan 0-6 (2 2pt, 0-1 45), D Sheedy 1-2, R Deane, O Corcoran, O O’Donovan 0-1 each.

27 September 2026 Quarter-final	Nemo Rangers	1-20 - 1-17	Castlehaven	Ahamilla GAA Complex
	B Hayes (1-4, tp); R Corkery (0-5, 0-2 frees); C Molloy (0-3); J Horgan, D O’Sullivan (0-2 each); K O’Donovan, A O’Donovan, M Cronin, C Shalloe (0-1 each).	Report	B Hurley (0-10, tp free, 0-3 frees); J Cahalane (1-0); C Cahalane (0-3, tp); Damien Cahalane, C Maguire, A Whelton, S Browne (0-1 each).

=== Semi-finals ===
10 October 2026 Semi-final	Carrigaline	0-16 - 1-15	Nemo Rangers	SuperValu Páirc Uí Chaoimh
	E Desmond 0-6 (0-1 f), B Coakley 0-5 (2 tp), J McCarthy 0-3, B O’Driscoll, N Coakley 0-1 each.	Report	M Cronin 1-7 (1-0 pen, 1 tp, 1 tpf, 0-1 f), R Corkery (tp), B Murphy 0-2 each, L Horgan, R Dalton, B Hayes, D O’Sullivan 0-1 each.

10 October 2026 Semi-final	Clonakilty	0-16 - 2-12	St Finbarr's	SuperValu Páirc Uí Chaoimh
	C Daly (1 2pt), D Gough (1 2pt, 0-1 f) 0-5 each, D Ó Sé 0-3 (1 2pt), M White (0-1 45), C Kenneally, D Harrington 0-1 each.	Report	S Sherlock 0-6 (2 2pt f, 0-1 f), B Hayes 0-4, R Barrett 1-1, T Egan 1-0, C Dennehy 0-1.

=== Final ===
25 October 2026 Final	Nemo Rangers	1-19 - 2-12	St Finbarr's	SuperValu Páirc Uí Chaoimh
	M Cronin 0-8 (0-5 f, 1 2pt), L Horgan 1-0, R Dalton 0-3, B Murphy (1 2pt), R Corkery, A O’Donovan 0-2 each, B Hayes, C Shalloe 0-1 each.	Report	J Wigginton-Barrett 1-2, B Hayes 1-0, C Myers-Murray (1 2pt), E Dennehy 0-3 each, W Buckley 0-2, L Hannigan, I Maguire 0-1 each.	Attendance: 7,054; Referee: D Murnane (Macroom)

== Championship statistics ==
=== Top scorers ===
Overall

Rank	Player	Club	Tally	Total	Matches	Average
1	Steven Sherlock	St Finbarr's	2-29	35	6	5.83
2	Ross Corkery	Nemo Rangers	0-27	27	6	4.50
3	Brian Hurley	Castlehaven	0-26	26	4	6.50
4	Mark Lenahan	Avondhu	3-14	23	4	5.75
5	Mark Cronin	Nemo Rangers	1-19	22	4	5.50
6	Éanna Desmond	Carrigaline	0-21	21	4	5.25
7	Ben Twomey	Avondhu	4-08	20	4	5.00
7	Brian Hayes	St Finbarr's	3-11	20	6	3.33
7	Conor Daly	Clonakilty	1-17	20	5	4.00
7	Brian Coakley	Carrigaline	0-20	20	4	5.00
7	David Buckley	Newcestown	0-20	20	4	5.00

Single game

Rank	Player	Club	Tally	Total	Opposition
1	Luke Murphy	Duhallow	1-12	15	Carbery
2	Blake Murphy	Seandún	1-09	12	Avondhu
3	Seán McEvoy	Clonakilty	2-04	10	Ballincollig
3	Mark Lenahan	Avondhu	2-04	10	Seandún
3	Seán Coakley	Douglas	2-04	10	Mallow
3	Mark Cronin	Nemo Rangers	1-07	10	Carrigaline
3	Brian Hurley	Castlehaven	0-10	10	Nemo Rangers
8	Steven Sherlock	St Finbarr's	1-06	9	Douglas
8	Brian Coakley	Carrigaline	0-09	9	Douglas
8	Daniel Murnane	Imokilly	0-09	9	MTU Cork
8	Ross Corkery	Nemo Rangers	0-09	9	St Michael's
8	Damien Gore	Carbery	0-09	9	Duhallow
