= Michael Scanlan =

Michael Scanlan may refer to:

- Michael Scanlan (priest) (1931–2017), Roman Catholic priest
- Michael Scanlan (diplomat) (born 1961), American diplomat
- Michael Scanlan (poet) (1833–1917), Irish nationalist, editor, poet and writer

== See also ==
- Michael Scanlon (disambiguation)
- Scanlan (surname)
