= Michael Scanlon (disambiguation) =

Michael Scanlon is a former communications director and public relations executive who has pleaded guilty to corruption charges.

Michael Scanlon may also refer to:

- Michael Scanlon (baseball) (1843–1929), baseball manager

== See also ==
- Michael Scanlan (disambiguation)
