= Cork Premier Senior Football Championship =

Annual Gaelic football competition

- Current season or competition: 2026 Cork Premier Senior Football Championship
- Irish: Craobh Peile Sinsearach Chorcaí
- Code: Gaelic football
- Founded: 1887; 139 years ago
- Region: Cork (GAA)
- Trophy: Andy Scannell Cup
- No. of teams: 12 (group stage); 3 (divisional qualifying round)
- Title holders: Castlehaven (7th title)
- Most titles: Nemo Rangers (23 titles)
- Sponsors: McCarthy Insurance Group
- TV partner(s): TG4, RTÉ
- Official website: Cork GAA

The Cork Premier Senior Football Championship (known for sponsorship reasons as the McCarthy Insurance Group Cork Premier Senior Football Championship and abbreviated to the Cork PSFC) is an annual club Gaelic football competition organised by the Cork County Board of the Gaelic Athletic Association and contested by the top-ranking senior clubs and amalgamated teams in the county of Cork in Ireland, deciding the competition winners through a group and knockout format. It is the most prestigious competition in Cork Gaelic football.

Introduced in 1887 as the Cork Senior Football Championship, it was initially a straight knockout tournament open only to senior-ranking club teams, with its winner reckoned as the Cork county champion. The competition took on its current name in 2020, adding a round-robin group stage for clubs and limiting the number divisional entrants to the championship proper.

In its present format, the Cork Premier Senior Championship begins with a preliminary qualifying round for the divisional teams and educational institutions. The sole surviving team from this stage automatically qualified for the knockout phase. The 12 club teams are drawn into three groups of four teams and play each other in a single round-robin system. The three group winners, three runners-up and three third-placed teams proceed to the knockout phase that culminates with the final match at Páirc Uí Chaoimh in October. The winner of the Cork Premier Senior Championship, as well as being presented with the Andy Scannell Cup, qualifies for the subsequent Munster Club Championship. In 2020, the intended format was disrupted and slightly amended due to the impact of the COVID-19 pandemic on Gaelic games.

The competition has been won by 29 teams, 19 of which have won it more than once. Nemo Rangers are the most successful team in the tournament's history, having won it 24 times. Nemo Rangers have established themselves as the dominant force in Cork football by winning 24 county finals out of the 28 they have been in.

Nemo Rangers are the title-holders, defeating St. Finbarr's by 1-19 to 2-12 in the 2026 final.

== History ==
=== 19th century ===
Following the foundation of the Gaelic Athletic Association in 1884, new rules for Gaelic football and hurling were drawn up and published in the United Irishman newspaper. Throughout 1886, county committees were established, with the Cork County Board affiliating on 19 December 1886. Plans to hold championships in both hurling and football were drawn up over the following weeks, with an advert inviting teams to enter appearing in the Cork Examiner on 15 January 1887. The cost of entering a team was 2s 6d and the closing date for entries was 29 January 1887. The championship draw took place at 23 Maylor Street on the day after the closing date and "the utmost good feeling was displayed, and...the contesting parties were agreeably satisfied" as the draw took place. Seven clubs entered: Blarney (who later withdrew), Carrignavar, Emmets, Glanmire, Lees, Lisgoold, Midleton.

All of the matches in the inaugural championship took place at a special enclosure in Cork City Park, with the first match taking place "in the presence of several thousand persons" on 6 March 1887. Mr. J. E. Kennedy acted as referee and Messrs E. Cotter and W. Sheehan performed the duties of goal umpires. That game between Lees and Emmets was described in the Cork Examiner as being "closely contested", however, it was "not characterized [sic] by any particularly brilliant play" and ended in a scoreless draw. The replay two weeks later saw Lees record the first championship victory after a 1-02 to no score win over Emmets. The final first-round game between Lisgoold and Midleton also ended in a draw, however, it became the first ever championship match to feature extra-time when two fifteen-minute periods were played after the initial hour. The first final to be played took place on 10 July 1887, with Lees beating Lisgoold by 0-04 to 0-01. They later went on to represent Cork in the first All-Ireland Championship.

The 1888 championship saw an increase in the number of participating teams to 27 from 25 different clubs, with Midleton and Lisgoold also fielding second teams. In an effort to cut down on travel costs for clubs, the County Board adopted a divisional structure to the championship. The participating teams were divided into seven divisions along geographic lines; Cork City, East Cork, Mid Cork, North Cork, North-East Cork, South Cork and West Cork. Tracton were the only representatives from South Cork. The six divisional champions and Tracton, as the sole South Cork representatives, qualified for the county-wide series of games.

Towards the end of 1888, a serious split in the Association in Cork lead to the existence of three rival and distinct county boards. 40 clubs left the official board and affiliated to the Cork Board, under the presidency of Fr. O'Connor, and the O'Brien Board under the presidency of Fr. Carver. These three boards ran their own separate championships over the following two seasons, however, the Cork County Board remained as the official administrative branch of the GAA. In 1890, Midleton, as official county champions, became the first Cork representatives to win the All-Ireland Championship. The three individual boards unified under the banner of the Cork County Board in 1891, with the championship continuing to be run on a divisional basis. The championship reverted to a straight knock-out format in 1892, with the first and second teams being separated in the draw.

=== 20th century ===
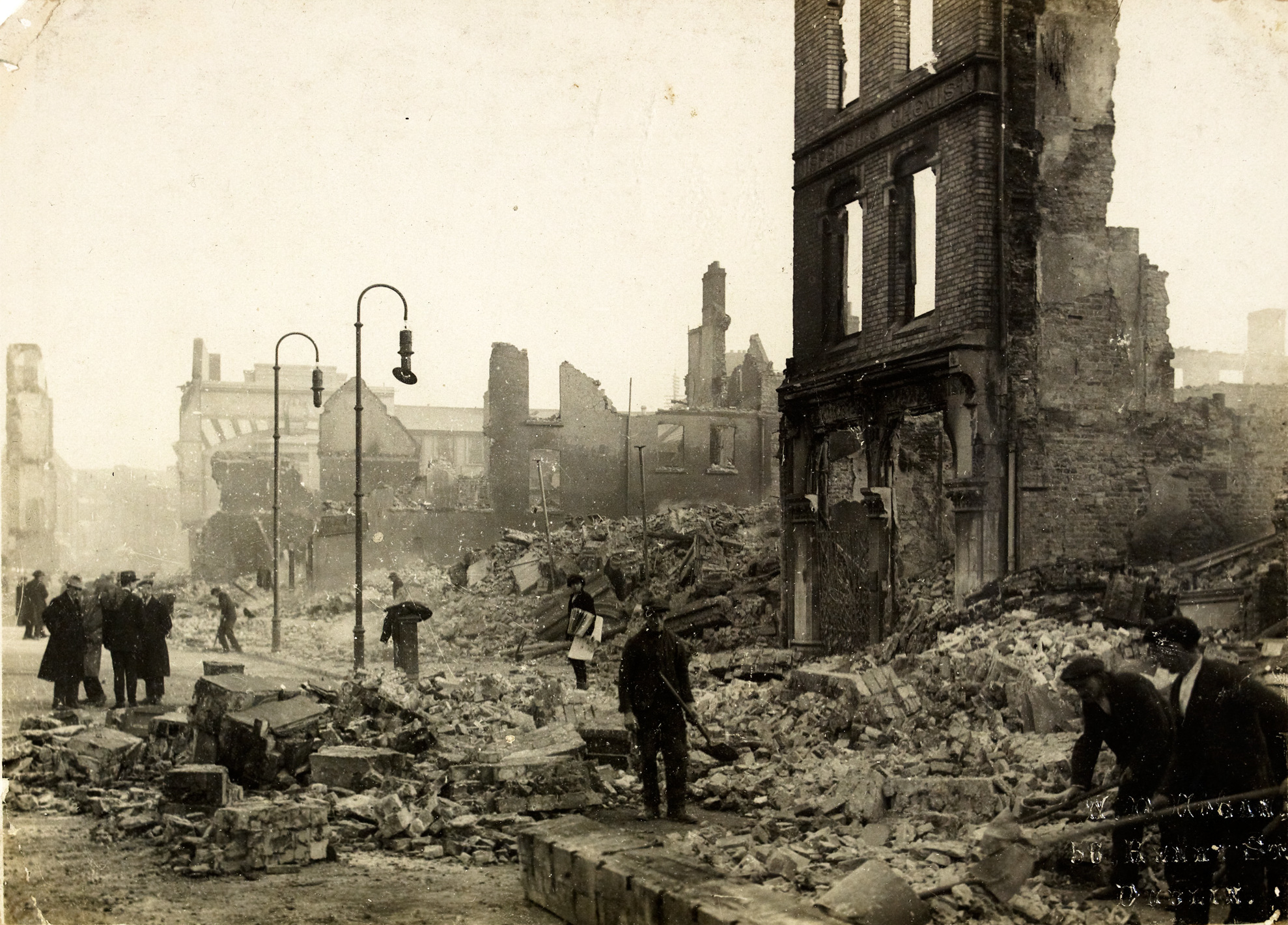
Civil unrest following the burning of Cork during the War of Independence led to the 1921 championship being cancelled.

On 10 March 1907, the newly built Cork Athletic Grounds hosted the final for the very first time. It remained as the regular final venue for the following 67 years. The War of Independence (1919-1921) saw Cork take a prominent role, something which had an adverse effect on the smooth running of the championships. Civil unrest following a series of events, including the murder of Lord Mayor Tomás Mac Curtain, the death from hunger strike of Lord Mayor Terence MacSwiney and the burning of Cork at the height of the war, resulted in the cancellation of the championships in 1921 and 1922.

The first decades of the new century brought new teams but not in a traditional sense. Food production company Crosse & Blackwell, third level educational institution University College Cork (UCC) and Collins Military Barracks all entered teams, however, UCC are the only team to continue fielding a team as of 2020. The creation of the divisional boards in the late 1920s added a new dimension to the championship. These divisional teams were composed of junior and intermediate players and afforded every player in the county the chance of winning a senior championship medal. Beara became the first division to win the title when they beat Clonakilty in the 1932 final.

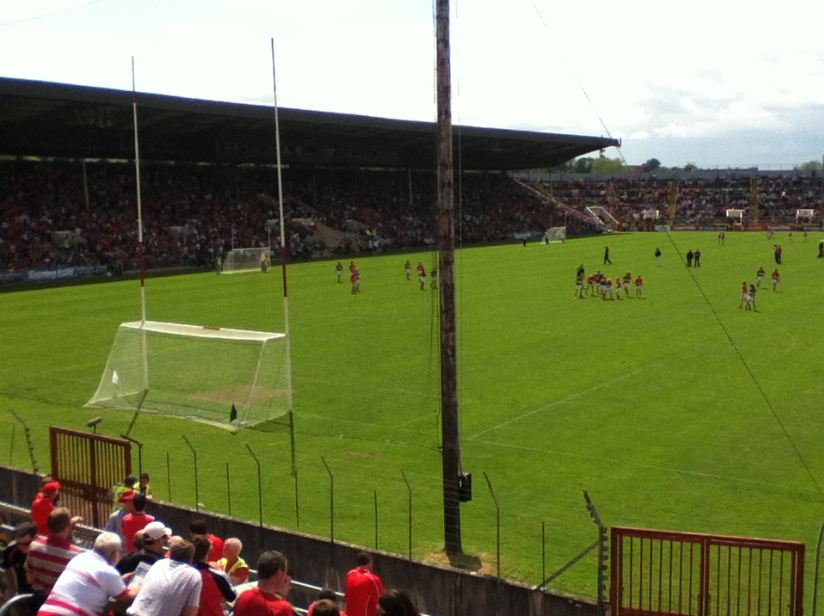
The old Páirc Uí Chaoimh hosted the finals from 1976 to 2014.

After 90 years of using the single-elimination straight knock-out format, problems arose regarding the standard of the competing teams. A special committee was established to examine the possibility of restructuring the championship format. At the County Convention on 5 February 1978, delegates voted by 138 to 83 in favour of abandoning the knock-out format and adopting a group stage. This format was used for three successive season from 1978 until 1980, with Nemo Rangers and St. Finbarr's becoming the first teams to win the championship after suffering a defeat. At the County Convention on 25 January 1981, it was decided to abandon the group stage format and introduce a new graded draw with divisional, rural and city clubs all being grouped individually. The winners of the first two groupings progressed to one semi-final, with two of the city teams qualifying for the other semi-final. The new format was introduced to guarantee a city-county pairing in the final. The County Board voted to revert to the single-elimination straight knock-out format in 1982.

In 1995, Cork Regional Technical College was permitted to field a team in the championship for the first time.

=== 21st century ===
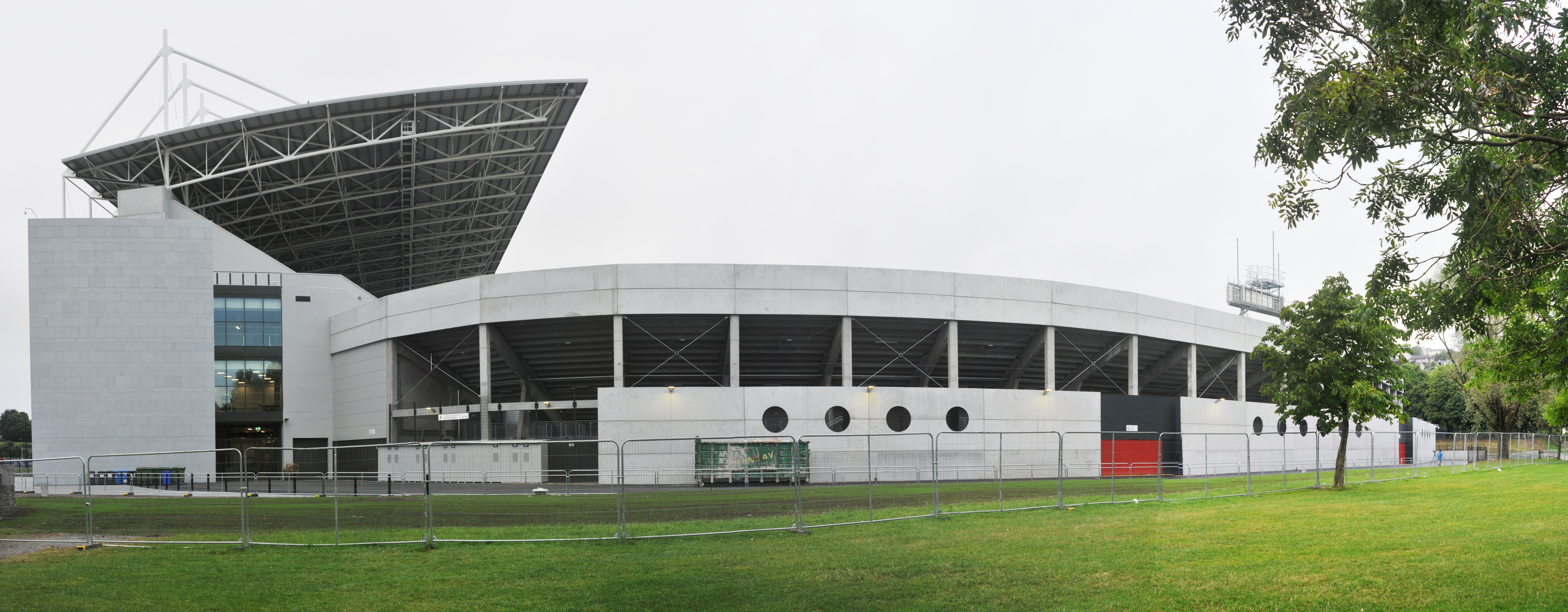
The redeveloped Páirc Uí Chaoimh became the regular final venue in 2017.

The introduction of a "back door" system at inter-county level in the All-Ireland Hurling Championship in 1997 led to the idea of introducing a second chance for defeated teams at county level. In 2000 a double-elimination format was introduced which afforded all club teams a second chance by remaining in the championship after a first-round defeat. In the two decades that followed the championship format continued to evolve with a number of minor tweaks. The provision of a second chance for defeated teams was later expanded to allow teams the opportunity of being defeated twice and still remain in the championship. The splitting of the intermediate grade in two resulted in the introduction of relegation in 2006, with Mallow and St. Michael's becoming the first teams to be relegated that year. Prior to this teams were allowed to decide for themselves if they wanted to regrade or retain their senior status.

=== Club dominance ===
City club Lees were the dominant force during the first thirty years of the championship. Between 1887 and 1914 they won ten championship titles before going into a period of decline. Their hegemony was closely followed by Fermoy who enjoyed their own golden era by winning six championships between 1895 and 1906. Lees city based rivals, Nils, also featured regularly in county finals and won six titles between 1894 and 1925.

Macroom joined the roll of honour by winning their first championship in 1909. Seven more titles followed up to 1935. After University College Cork made the breakthrough and dominated the 1920s, the following decade was dominated by divisional sides. Beara lead the way by claiming four championship titles between 1932 and 1940, while Duhallow and Carbery also won two championship titles at this time. Clonakilty made their own breakthrough by winning their first championship in 1939. It was the first of seven titles up to 1952. The rest of the decade belonged to St. Finbarr's, who became the first single-entity club to win championship titles in both hurling and Gaelic football. After a period in the doldrums, UCC were back as a dominant force by winning five championships between 1960 and 1973.

Since winning their first championship title in 1972, Nemo Rangers have gone on to dominate the championship. In the 45 years since then they have won a total of 21 championship titles. In spite of brief periods of dominance by other teams, most notably St. Finbarr's who won five titles between 1976 and 1985, Nemo Rangers have established themselves as the dominant force of Cork Gaelic football.

=== Formats used ===
For over 100 years the championship used a single elimination format. Each team was afforded only one defeat before being eliminated from the championship. The creation of the divisions in the 1920s added a new dimension to the championship. These divisional teams, which were composed of junior and intermediate players, competed in a preliminary section with the two winning teams advancing to the championship proper which retained its single elimination format. The introduction of a "back door" system at inter-county level in the All-Ireland Hurling Championship in 1997 lead to the idea of introducing a second chance for defeated teams at county level. In the twenty-year period from the late 1990s to 2017, the championship underwent a number of format changes. The provision of a second chance for defeated teams was later expanded to allow teams the opportunity of being defeated twice and still remain in the championship. The splitting of the intermediate grade in two resulted in the introduction of relegation in 2006. Prior to this teams were allowed to decide for themselves if they wanted to regrade or retain their senior status. In 2015 the championship once again reverted to a double elimination format.

== Format ==
=== Current ===
==== Development ====
On 2 April 2019, a majority of 136 club delegates voted to restructure the championship once again. The new format led to the splitting of the championship in two and the creation of the Cork Premier Senior Championship and the Cork Senior A Championship.

==== Overview ====
Group stage: The 12 club teams are divided into three groups of four. Over the course of the group stage, which features one game in April and two games in August, each team plays once against the others in the group, resulting in each team being guaranteed at least three games. Two points are awarded for a win, one for a draw and zero for a loss. The teams are ranked in the group stage table by points gained, then scoring difference and then their head-to-head record. The top two teams in each group qualify for the quarter-finals.

Divisional and colleges section: University College Cork, Cork Institute of Technology and the divisional sides compete in a separate section, with one team qualifying for the knock-out stage.

Preliminary quarter-finals: Two lone preliminary quarter-finals feature the three third-placed teams from the group stage and the winners of the divisional and colleges section. Two teams qualify for the next round.

Quarter-finals: The four quarter-finals feature the six teams from the group stage and the two preliminary quarter-final winners. Four teams qualify for the next round.

Semi-finals: The two semi-finals feature four teams. Two teams qualify for the next round.

Final: The two semi-final winners contest the final. The winning team are declared champions.

== Teams ==
=== 2027 Teams ===
22 teams are eligible to compete in the 2027 Cork Premier Senior Football Championship: 12 clubs in the group stage and 10 divisional teams in the divisional/colleges section.

Team	Location	Club/division	Club's division side	Colours	Position in 2026	In championship since	Championship titles	Last championship title
Avondhu	North Cork	Division	N/A	Black and yellow	Divisions/colleges section semi-finals	2026	1	1961
Ballincollig	Ballincollig	Club	Muskerry	Green and white	Group stage	1995	1	2014
Beara	Beara Peninsula	Division	N/A	Red and white	Divisions/colleges round 2	2026	6	1997
Carbery	West Cork	Division	N/A	Purple with gold hoop	Quarter-finals	?	4	2004
Carrigaline	Carrigaline	Club	Carrigdhoun	Blue and yellow	Semi-finals	2025	0	—
Carrigdhoun	South-East Cork	Division	N/A	black and gold strip	—	2027	0	—
Castlehaven	Castlehaven	Club	Carbery	Royal blue and white	Quarter-finals	1979	7	2024
Clonakilty	Clonakilty	Club	Carbery	Green and red	Semi-finals	1932	9	2009
Douglas	Douglas	Club	Seandún	Green, black and white hoops	Group stage	1998	0	—
Duhallow	Duhallow	Division	N/A	Orange and black	Divisions/colleges section semi-finals	?	3	1991
Imokilly	East Cork	Division	N/A	Red and white	Divisions/colleges round 3	2026	2	1986
Kanturk	Kanturk	Club	Duhallow	Green and white	Senior A champions	2027	0	—
Knocknagree	Knocknagree	Club	Duhallow	White and royal blue	Group stage	2026	0	—
Mallow	Mallow	Club	Avondhu	Red and yellow	Group stage	2022	0	—
MTU Cork	Bishopstown	Division	N/A	Red and white	Divisions/colleges section round 1	2026	0	—
Muskerry	Muskerry	Division	N/A	White and green	Divisions/colleges section final	?	1	1970
Nemo Rangers	South Douglas Road	Club	Seandún	Black and green	Champions	?	24	2026
Newcestown	Newcestown	Club	Carbery	Red and gold	Quarter-finals	2024	0	—
Seandún	Cork City	Division	N/A	Red and white	Divisions/colleges section round 1	2026	0	—
St Finbarr's	Togher	Club	Seandún	Royal blue and gold	Runners-up	2009	11	2025
University College Cork	College Road	Division	N/A	Red and black	—	2027	10	2011
Valley Rovers	Innishannon	Club	Carrigdhoun	Green and white	Group stage	2015	0	—

=== Clubs eligible for divisional teams ===
Division	Clubs eligible for divisional team
Avondhu	Abbey Rovers, Araglen, Ballyclough, Ballyhea, Ballyhooly, Buttevant, Charleville, Deel Rovers, Doneraile, Dromina, Fermoy, Glanworth, Grange, Kildorrery, Killavullen, Kilworth, Liscarroll Churchtown Gaels, Mitchelstown, Shanballymore
Beara	Adrigole, Bere Island, Castletownbere, Garnish, Glengarriff, Urhan
Carbery	Argideen Rangers, Ballinascarthy, Bandon, Bantry Blues, Barryroe, Clann na nGael, Diarmuid Ó Mathúna's, Gabriel Rangers, Goleen, Ilen Rovers, Kilbrittain, Kilmacabea, Kilmeen, Muintir Bháire, O'Donovan Rossa, Randal Óg, St Colum's, St. James, St Mary's, St Oliver Plunkett's, Tadhg MacCarthaigh
Carrigdhoun	Ballinhassig, Ballygarvan, Ballymartle, Belgooly, Courcey Rovers, Crosshaven, Kinsale, Shamrocks, Tracton
Duhallow	Ballydesmond, Boherbue, Castlemagner, Cullen, Dromtarriffe, Freemount, Glenlara, Kilbrin, Kiskeam, Lismire, Lyre, Millstreet, Rockchapel, St John's, Tullylease
Imokilly	Aghada, Ballinacurra, Bride Rovers, Carrignavar, Carrigtwohill, Castlelyons, Castlemartyr, Cobh, Cloyne, Dungourney, Erin's Own, Fr. O'Neills, Glenbower Rovers, Glenville, Lisgoold, Midleton, Russell Rovers, St. Catherine's, Youghal
Muskerry	Aghinagh, Ballinora, Blarney, Canovee, Clondrohid, Donoughmore, Dripsey, Grenagh, Gleann na Laoi, Inniscarra, Kilmurry, Kilmichael, Macroom, Naomh Abán
Seandún	Ballinure, Ballyphehane, Brian Dillons, Delaney Rovers, Glanmire, Lough Rovers, Mayfield, Na Laochra Aeracha, Na Piarsaigh, Passage West, Rathpeacon, Rochestown, St. Nicholas, St. Vincent's, Whitechurch, White's Cross

== Sponsorship ==
TSB Bank became the first title sponsor of the championship, serving in that capacity until 2005 when the Evening Echo signed a sponsorship deal. In 2020, Bon Secours Hospital were unveiled as the new title sponsor of the Cork Premier Senior Championship. McCarthy Insurance Group became the new title sponsor in December 2023.

== Qualification for subsequent competitions ==
The Cork Premier Senior Football Championship winners qualify for the subsequent Munster Senior Club Football Championship. This place is reserved for club teams only as divisional and amalgamated teams are currently not allowed in the provincial championship. If a divisional side wins the Cork Championship then the runners-up, if they are a club team, qualify for the Munster Championship. This has occurred on several occasions.

== Venues ==
=== Group stage ===
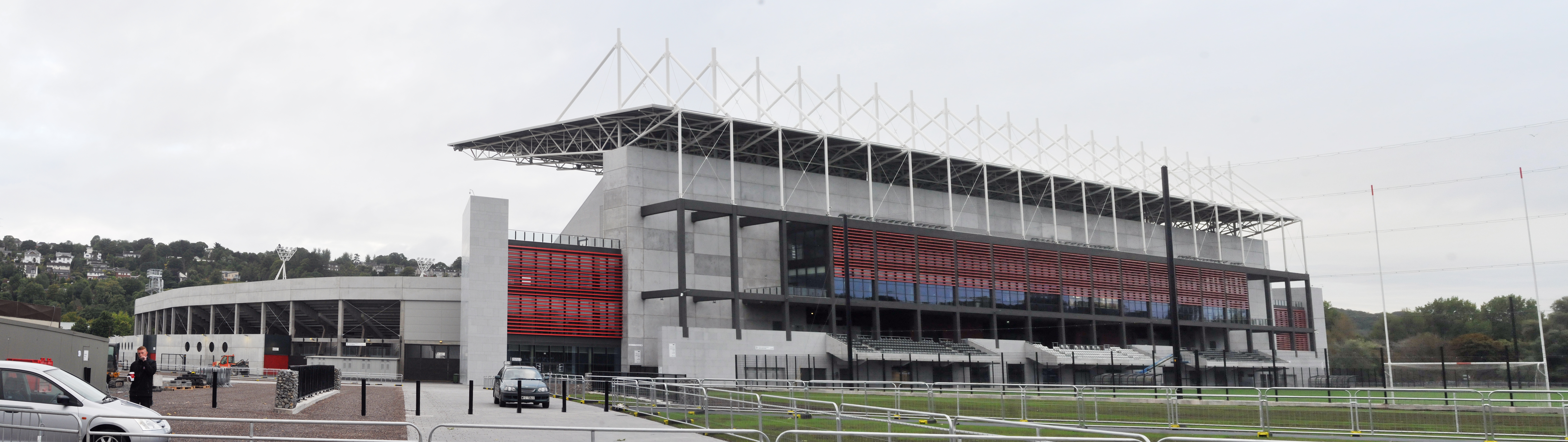
Since 2017 the county final has been held at Páirc Uí Chaoimh, on the site of the previous stadium which hosted it from 1976 to 2014.

Fixtures in the group stage of the championship are usually played at a neutral venue that is deemed halfway between the participating teams. Some of the more common venues include Charlie Hurley Park, Brinny Sportsfield, Coachford Pitch, Sam Maguire Park and Rossa Park. All games in the knockout stage are played at either Páirc Uí Rinn or Páirc Uí Chaoimh.

=== Final ===
The final has been played at the rebuilt Páirc Uí Chaoimh since it opened in 2017. The rebuilding process meant that the finals of 2015 and 2016 were hosted at Páirc Uí Rinn. Continuing work on the pitch at the new stadium resulted in the 2019 final also being played at Páirc Uí Rinn. Prior to rebuilding, the final was hosted by the original Páirc Uí Chaoimh since it opened in 1976. The final was played at the Mardyke in 1974 and 1975, while in the 70 years prior to the development of Páirc Uí Chaoimh the final was usually played at the Cork Athletic Grounds. From the inaugural championship in 1887 up to the turn of the 20th century, the final was held at a variety of venues in the city and around the county, most notably the Cork Park enclosure.

== Managers ==
Managers in the Cork Championship are involved in the day-to-day running of the team, including the training, team selection, and sourcing of players. Their influence varies from club-to-club and is related to the individual club committees. The manager is assisted by a team of two or three selectors and a backroom team consisting of various coaches.

Winning managers
Manager	Team	Wins	Winning years
Billy Morgan	Nemo Rangers	11	1972, 1974, 1975, 1978, 1987, 1988, 2000, 2001, 2002
Ephie Fitzgerald	Nemo Rangers	4	2005, 2006, 2007, 2008
James McCarthy	Castlehaven	3	2003, 2012, 2023
Paul O'Keeffe	University College Cork; St. Finbarr's	1	2011, 2021
Paul O'Donovan	Nemo Rangers	1	2019, 2020
Michael O'Donovan	Clonakilty	2	1996
Des Cullinane	University College Cork	1	1999
John Corcoran	Carbery	1	2004
Haulie O'Neill	Clonakilty	2	2009
Eddie Kirwan	Nemo Rangers	1	2010
Finbarr Santry	Castlehaven	1	2013
Michael O'Brien	Ballincollig	1	2014
Steven O'Brien	Nemo Rangers	1	2015
Ronan McCarthy	Carbery Rangers	1	2016
Larry Kavanagh	Nemo Rangers	1	2017
Ray Keane	St. Finbarr's	1	2018
Stephen Cronin	Nemo Rangers	1	2026

== Trophy ==
The winning team is presented with the Andy Scannell Cup. Andy Scannell, a teacher at Clondulane National School outside Fermoy, was a County Senior Football selector when Cork won the Sam Maguire in 1945. He was later Chairman of the North Cork Division before taking office as Cork County Chairman in the early '50s, and steered the county to All-Ireland hurling victory during his term.

== Roll of honour ==
=== By team ===
#	Team	Titles	Runners-up	Championships won	Championships runners-up
1	Nemo Rangers	23	7	1972, 1974, 1975, 1977, 1978, 1981, 1983, 1987, 1988, 1993, 2000, 2001, 2002, 2005, 2006, 2007, 2008, 2010, 2015, 2017, 2019, 2020, 2022, 2026	1970, 1992, 1999, 2013, 2023, 2024, 2025
2	Lees	12	2	1887, 1888, 1896, 1902, 1903, 1904, 1907, 1908, 1911, 1914, 1923, 1955	1917, 1957
3	St Finbarr's	11	12	1956, 1957, 1959, 1976, 1979, 1980, 1982, 1985, 2018, 2021, 2025	1965, 1966, 1984, 1986, 1989, 1990, 1991, 1993, 2009, 2010, 2017, 2022
4	Macroom	10	8	1909, 1910, 1912, 1913, 1926, 1930, 1931, 1935, 1958, 1962	1889, 1907, 1925, 1927, 1929, 1949, 1955, 1959
4	University College Cork	10	8	1920, 1927, 1928, 1960, 1963, 1964, 1969, 1973, 1999, 2011	1924, 1926, 1953, 1967, 1971, 1972, 1980, 1996
6	Clonakilty	9	14	1939, 1942, 1943, 1944, 1946, 1947, 1952, 1996, 2009	1932, 1933, 1934, 1935, 1936, 1938, 1945, 1951, 1961, 1968, 1983, 1985, 2003, 2021
7	Fermoy	7	12	1895, 1898, 1899, 1900, 1905, 1906, 1945	1901, 1904, 1908, 1912, 1913, 1915, 1916, 1918, 1942, 1943, 1944, 1946
7	Castlehaven	7	5	1989, 1994, 2003, 2012, 2013, 2023, 2024	1979, 1997, 2011, 2015, 2020
8	Nils	6	4	1894, 1901, 1915, 1917, 1924, 1925	1891, 1895, 1899, 1911
8	Beara	6	1	1932, 1933, 1934, 1940, 1967, 1997	1939
11	St. Nicholas'	5	5	1938, 1941, 1954, 1965, 1966	1947, 1950, 1951, 1963, 1969
12	Carbery	4	5	1937, 1968, 1971, 2004	1931, 1964, 1973, 1974, 2000
12	Collins	4	1	1929, 1949, 1951, 1953	1952
9	Duhallow	3	8	1936, 1990, 1991	1928, 1937, 1982, 1988, 1998, 2012, 2018, 2019
15	Bantry Blues	2	3	1995, 1998	1909, 1981, 2001
15	Cobh	2	2	1918, 1919	1910, 1920
15	Imokilly	2	1	1984, 1986	1987
15	Midleton	2	0	1889, 1890	—
15	Clondrohid	2	0	1891, 1892	—
20	Dohenys	1	4	1897	1898, 1903, 1975, 2006
20	Millstreet	1	3	1948	1940, 1941, 1956
20	Muskerry	1	3	1970	1962, 1995, 2005
20	Carbery Rangers	1	3	2016	1905, 1906, 2014
20	Dromtarriffe	1	2	1893	1888, 1890
20	Avondhu	1	2	1961	1958, 1960
20	O'Donovan Rossa	1	1	1992	1994
20	Ballincollig	1	1	2014	2016
20	Collegians	1	0	1916	—
20	Garda	1	0	1950	—
30	Kanturk	0	3	—	1896, 1897, 1902
30	Youghal	0	3	—	1914, 1919, 1923
30	St Michael's	0	3	—	1976, 1977, 1978
30	Bishopstown	0	2	—	2002, 2004
30	Lisgoold	0	1	—	1887
30	Kilmurry	0	1	—	1892
30	Castlemartyr	0	1	—	1893
30	Kinsale Black & Whites	0	1	—	1894
30	Kinsale	0	1	—	1900
30	Na Deasunaigh	0	1	—	1930
30	St Vincent's	0	1	—	1948
30	Ilen Rovers	0	1	—	2007
30	Douglas	0	1	—	2008

=== By Division ===
#	Division	Titles	Runners-up	Total	Most recent success
1	Seandun	62	39	101	2025
2	Carbery	25	36	61	2024
3	Muskerry	14	13	27	2014
4	Colleges	11	8	19	2011
5	Avondhu	8	14	22	1961
6	Imokilly	6	8	14	1986
6	Beara	6	1	7	1997
8	Duhallow	5	16	21	1991
9	Carrigdhoun	0	2	2	—

== List of finals ==
Year	Winners		Runners-up	
Year	Club	Score	Club	Score
2025	St Finbarr's	1-14	Nemo Rangers	1-13
2024	Castlehaven	0-16	Nemo Rangers	0-11
2023	Castlehaven	0-11	Nemo Rangers	0-09
2022	Nemo Rangers	1-16	St Finbarr's	2-09
2021	St. Finbarr's	0-14	Clonakilty	0-13
2020	Nemo Rangers	3-07	Castlehaven	0-13
2019	Nemo Rangers	2-08	Duhallow	0-10
2018	St. Finbarr's	3–14	Duhallow	2–14
2017	Nemo Rangers	0-14, 4-12 (R)	St. Finbarr's	0-14, 3-13 (R)
2016	Carbery Rangers	1–15	Ballincollig	1–12
2015	Nemo Rangers	0–10, 1–10 (R)	Castlehaven	0–10, 0–11 (R)
2014	Ballincollig	1–13	Carbery Rangers	1–10
2013	Castlehaven	0–16	Nemo Rangers	1–11
2012	Castlehaven	1–07	Duhallow	0–09
2011	UCC	1–12	Castlehaven	0–10
2010	Nemo Rangers	2-10	St. Finbarr's	1-08
2009	Clonakilty	1-13	St. Finbarr's	1-12
2008	Nemo Rangers	0-13	Douglas	0-05
2007	Nemo Rangers	0-12	Ilen Rovers	0-09
2006	Nemo Rangers	1-11	Dohenys	0-07
2005	Nemo Rangers	1-14	Muskerry	0-07
2004	Carbery	1-11	Bishopstown	0-07
2003	Castlehaven	1-09	Clonakilty	1-07
2002	Nemo Rangers	0-15	Bishopstown	1-07
2001	Nemo Rangers	1-14	Bantry Blues	0-06
2000	Nemo Rangers	1-14	Carbery	0-07
1999	UCC	1-11	Nemo Rangers	1-08
1998	Bantry Blues	0-17	Duhallow	2-06
1997	Beara	1-10	Castlehaven	1-07
1996	Clonakilty	1-09	UCC	0-10
1995	Bantry Blues	0-10	Muskerry	0-08
1994	Castlehaven	0-12	O'Donovan Rossa	0-10
1993	Nemo Rangers	0-13	St. Finbarr's	0-04
1992	O'Donovan Rossa	2-09	Nemo Rangers	0-10
1991	Duhallow	0-11	St. Finbarr's	0-10
1990	Duhallow	0-08	St. Finbarr's	0-06
1989	Castlehaven	0-09	St. Finbarr's	0-07
1988	Nemo Rangers	2-08	Duhallow	0-10
1987	Nemo Rangers	2-11	Imokilly	0-09
1986	Imokilly	2-04	St. Finbarr's	0-09
1985	St. Finbarr's	1-10	Clonakilty	0-09
1984	Imokilly	1-14	St. Finbarr's	2-07
1983	Nemo Rangers	4-12	Clonakilty	2-03
1982	St. Finbarr's	1-05	Duhallow	0-05
1981	Nemo Rangers	3-11	Bantry Blues	0-06
1980	St. Finbarr's	3-08	UCC	1-09
1979	St. Finbarr's	3-14	Castlehaven	2-07
1978	Nemo Rangers	1-09	St Michael's	1-03
1977	Nemo Rangers	1-08	St Michael's	1-03
1976	St. Finbarr's	1-10	St Michael's	1-07
1975	Nemo Rangers	4-12	Dohenys	0-07
1974	Nemo Rangers	2-08	Carbery	1-08
1973	UCC	3-08	Carbery	1-10
1972	Nemo Rangers	2-09	UCC	0-08
1971	Carbery	3-11	UCC	2-08
1970	Muskerry	3-10	Nemo Rangers	4-06
1969	UCC	0-09	St. Nicholas	0-08
1968	Carbery	1-09	Clonakilty	1-06
1967	Beara	2-05	UCC	0-07
1966	St. Nicholas	1-07	St. Finbarr's	1-06
1965	St. Nicholas	2-04	St. Finbarr's	0-06
1964	UCC	0-12	Carbery	1-06
1963	UCC	1-06	St. Nicholas	1-05
1962	Macroom	3-04	Muskerry	1-04
1961	Avondhu	1-07	Clonakilty	1-05
1960	UCC	1-07	Avondhu	0-09
1959	St. Finbarr's	1-05	Macroom	0-06
1958	Macroom	1-07	Avondhu	0-09
1957	St. Finbarr's	0-08	Lees	0-05
1956	St. Finbarr's	3-05	Millstreet	0-04
1955	Lees	3-04	Macroom	0-09
1954	St. Nicholas	2-11	Clonakilty	0-03
1953	Collins	1-08	UCC	1-04
1952	Clonakilty	1-04	Collins	0-04
1951	Collins	3-02	St. Nicholas	1-05
1950	Garda	3-07	St. Nicholas	2-05
1949	Collins	5-11	Macroom	0-01
1948	Millstreet	1-02	St. Vincent's	0-03
1947	Clonakilty	2-05	St. Nicholas	1-04
1946	Clonakilty	1-02	Fermoy	0-03
1945	Fermoy	0-06	Clonakilty	0-03
1944	Clonakilty	1-09	Fermoy	1-05
1943	Clonakilty	2-05	Fermoy	1-04
1942	Clonakilty	1-08	Fermoy	1-05
1941	St. Nicholas	1-08	Millstreet	1-05
1940	Beara	2-08	Millstreet	1-07
1939	Clonakilty	0-07	Beara	0-05
1938	St. Nicholas	2-01	Clonakilty	0-02
1937	Carbery	3-08	Duhallow West	1-01
1936	Duhallow West	2-05	Clonakilty	0-02
1935	Macroom	1-03	Clonakilty	1-02
1934	Beara	2-06	Clonakilty	2-03
1933	Beara	2-05	Clonakilty	0-04
1932	Beara	2-02	Clonakilty	1-01
1931	Macroom	2-06	Carbery	2-02
1930	Macroom	2-08	Na Deasunaigh	2-03
1929	Collins		Macroom	
1928	UCC	1-06	Duhallow United	0-02
1927	UCC	3-03	Macroom	1-00
1926	Macroom	1-01	UCC	0-02
1925	Nils	4-03	Macroom	0-02
1924	Nils	0-08	UCC	0-02
1923	Lees	0-03	Youghal	0-02
1922	No Championship			
1921	No Championship			
1920	UCC	5-04	Cobh	0-01
1919	Cobh	4-03	Youhal	1-00
1918	Cobh	0-03	Fermoy	0-01
1917	Nils	0-02	Lees	0-00
1916	10-03	Fermoy	0-01	
1915	Nils	2-03	Fermoy	0-01
1914	Lees	2-05	Youghal	1-02
1913	Macroom	1-02	Fermoy	0-03
1912	Macroom	1-03	Fermoy	1-01
1911	Lees	2-04	Nils	0-01
1910	Macroom	5-06	Cobh	0-02
1909	Macroom	1-06	Bantry Blues	1-02
1908	Lees	2-08	Fermoy	0-06
1907	Lees	0-07	Macroom	1-02
1906	Fermoy	0-08	Carbery Rangers	0-00
1905	Fermoy		Carbery Rangers	
1904	Lees		Fermoy	
1903	Lees	1-07	Dohenys	0-02
1902	Lees	0-10	Kanturk	1-01
1901	Nils	0-08*	Fermoy	0-04
1900	Fermoy	1-09	Kinsale	1-06
1899	Fermoy		Nils	
1898	Fermoy	0-01*	Dohenys	0-02
1897	Dohenys	0-05	Kanturk	0-04
1896	Lees	0-03	Kanturk	0-00
1895	Fermoy	0-06	Nils	0-01
1894	Nils	1-13	Kinsale Black & Whites	0-01
1893	Dromtarriffe	0-05	Castlemartyr	0-03
1892	Clondrohid	1-04	Kilmurry	0-01
1891	Clondrohid	3-05	Nils	0-02
1890	Midleton	2-03	Dromtarriffe	0-02
1889	Midleton	1-00	Macroom	0-01
1888	Lees	0-03	Dromtarriffe	0-01
1887	Lees	0-04	Lisgoold	0-01

=== Notes ===
- The following finals were drawn: 1901, 1944, 1949, 1952, 1953, 1957, 1967, 1968, 1994, 1997, 1999, 2017
- No scores known for 1899 and 1904
- 1898 Objection and game awarded to Fermoy

== Records and statistics ==
=== Final ===
==== Team ====
- Most wins: 23:
  - Nemo Rangers (1972, 1974, 1975, 1977, 1978, 1981, 1983, 1987, 1988, 1993, 2000, 2001, 2002, 2005, 2006, 2007, 2008, 2010, 2015, 2017, 2019, 2020, 2022)
- Most consecutive wins: 4:
  - Nemo Rangers (2005, 2006, 2007, 2008)
- Most appearances in a final: 27
  - Nemo Rangers (1970, 1972, 1974, 1975, 1977, 1978, 1981, 1983, 1987, 1988, 1992, 1993, 1999, 2000, 2001, 2002, 2005, 2006, 2007, 2008, 2010, 2013, 2015, 2017, 2019, 2020, 2022)

=== Teams ===
==== By decade ====
The most successful team of each decade, judged by number of Cork Senior Football Championship titles, is as follows:

- 1880s: 2 for Lees (1887–88)
- 1890s: 3 for Fermoy (1895-98-99)
- 1900s: 5 for Lees (1902-03-04-07-08)
- 1910s: 3 for Macroom (1910-12-13)
- 1920s: 3 for University College Cork (1920-27-28)
- 1930s: 3 each for Macroom (1930-31-35) and Beara (1932-33-34)
- 1940s: 5 for Clonakilty (1942-43-44-46-47)
- 1950s: 3 for St. Finbarr's (1956-57-59)
- 1960s: 4 for University College Cork (1960-63-64-69)
- 1970s: 5 for Nemo Rangers (1972-74-75-77-78)
- 1980s: 4 for Nemo Rangers (1981-83-87-88)
- 1990s: 2 each for Duhallow (1990–91) and Bantry Blues (1995–98)
- 2000s: 7 for Nemo Rangers (2000-01-02-05-06-07-08)
- 2010s: 4 for Nemo Rangers (2010-15-17-19)

==== Successful defending ====
15 teams of the 29 who have won the championship have successfully defended the title. These are:

  - Nemo Rangers on 8 attempts out of 18 (1975, 1978, 1988, 2001, 2002, 2006, 2007, 2008)
  - Lees on 4 attempts out of 11 (1888, 1903, 1904, 1908)
  - Macroom on 3 attempts out of 9 (1910, 1913, 1931)
  - Clonakilty on 3 attempts out of 8 (1943, 1944, 1947)
  - Fermoy on 3 attempts out of 6 (1899, 1900, 1906)
  - University College Cork on 2 attempts out of 9 (1928, 1964)
  - St. Finbarr's on 2 attempts out of 7 (1957, 1980)
  - Beara on 2 attempts out of 5 (1932, 1934)
  - Nils on 1 attempt out of 5 (1925)
  - St. Nicholas' on 1 attempt out of 4 (1966)
  - Castlehaven on 1 attempt out of 4 (2013)
  - Duhallow on 1 attempt out of 2 (1991)
  - Cobh on 1 attempt out of 1 (1919)
  - Clondrohid on 1 attempt out of 1 (1892)
  - Midleton on 1 attempt out of 1 (1890)

==== Gaps ====
  - Top ten longest gaps between successive championship titles:
    - 54 years: Duhallow (1936-1990)
    - 44 years: Clonakilty (1952-1996)
    - 39 years: Fermoy (1906-1945)
    - 33 years: Carbery (1971-2004)
    - 32 years: Lees (1923-1955)
    - 32 years: University College Cork (1928-1960)
    - 31 years: Carbery (1937-1968)
    - 30 years: Beara (1967-1997)
    - 27 years: Beara (1940-1967)
    - 26 years: University College Cork (1973-1999)

=== Top scorers ===
==== All time ====
As of match played 24 July 2022.

Rank	Name	Team	Goals	Points	Total
1	Donncha O'Connor	Duhallow	17	324	375
2	John Hayes	Carbery / Carbery Rangers	19	287	344
3	Colin Corkery	Nemo Rangers	14	271	313
4	Dinny Allen	Nemo Rangers	30	188	278
5	James Masters	Nemo Rangers	13	228	267
6	Steven Sherlock	St. Finbarr's	12	215	251
7	Mark Collins	Castlehaven	12	209	245
8	Paul Kerrigan	Nemo Rangers	19	186	243
8	Brian Hurley	Castlehaven	18	195	249
10	Luke Connolly	Nemo Rangers	25	174	249
11	John Cleary	Castlehaven	6	215	233
12	Kevin O'Sullivan	Ilen Rovers / Carbery	10	188	218
13	Mícheál Ó Cróinín	Naomh Abán / UCC	10	171	201

==== By year ====
Year	Top scorer	Team	Score	Total
1992	Mick McCarthy	O'Donovan Rossa	3-26	35
1993	Colin Corkery	Nemo Rangers	4-36	48
1994	Mick McCarthy	O'Donovan Rossa	0-29	29
1995	Jonathan McCarthy	Muskerry	0-24	24
1996	Colin Corkery	Nemo Rangers	0-21	21
1997	Ciarán O'Sullivan	Beara	1-24	27
1998	Mark O'Sullivan	Duhallow	5-20	35
1999	Podsie O'Mahony	Ballincollig	1-34	37
2000	Paul Holland	Clyda Rovers	2-40	46
2001	Philip Clifford	Bantry Blues	7-13	34
2002	Colin Corkery	Nemo Rangers	2-33	39
2003	Jurgen Werner	O'Donovan Rossa	0-33	33
2004	Fionán Murray	St. Finbarr's	1-30	33
2005	James Masters	Nemo Rangers	2-40	46
2006	James Masters	Nemo Rangers	2-40	46
2007	James Masters	Nemo Rangers	2-29	35
2008	James Masters	Nemo Rangers	1-30	33
2009	Donncha O'Connor	Duhallow	3-19	28
2010	Donncha O'Connor	Duhallow	0-30	30
2011	Cian O'Riordan	Avondhu	1-27	30
2012	Donncha O'Connor	Duhallow	0-48	48
2013	Brian Hurley	Castlehaven	3-47	56
2014	John Hayes	Carbery Rangers	5-28	43
2015	Paul Kerrigan	Nemo Rangers	4-22	34
2016	Cian Dorgan	Ballincollig	2-31	37
2017	Steven Sherlock	St. Finbarr's	2-48	54
2018	Steven Sherlock	St. Finbarr's	3-37	46
2018	Mark Collins	Castlehaven	0-46	46
2019	John Hayes	Carbery Rangers	2-20	26
2020	Steven Sherlock	St. Finbarr's	3-36	45
2021	Steven Sherlock	St. Finbarr's	3-41	50

==== In a single game ====
Year	Top scorer	Team	Score	Total
2014	Jason Sexton	St. Finbarr's	3-04	13
2015	Paul Kerrigan	Nemo Rangers	3-03	12
2016	Kevin O'Sullivan	Ilen Rovers	3-06	15
2017	Mark Sugrue	Carbery	2-08	14
2018	Seán O'Sullivan	Kiskeam	1-11	14
2018	Kevin Davis	O'Donovan Rossa	1-11	14
2019	Steven Sherlock	St. Finbarr's	2-16	22
2020	Steven Sherlock	St. Finbarr's	1-11	14
2021	Steven Sherlock	St. Finbarr's	2-10	16

==== In finals ====
Final	Top scorer	Team	Score	Total
1995	Kevin Harrington	Bantry Blues	0-04	4
1995	Jonathan McCarthy	Muskerry	0-04	4
1996	Terry Dillon	Clonakilty	1-02	5
1997	Séamus Spencer	Beara	1-03	6
1998	J. P. O'Neill	Duhallow	2-01	7
1999	Colin Corkery (D)	Nemo Rangers	0-06	6
1999	Ian Twiss (R)	UCC	1-03	6
2000	Alan Cronin	Nemo Rangers	1-04	7
2001	Colin Corkery	Nemo Rangers	0-10	10
2002	Colin Corkery	Nemo Rangers	0-11	11
2003	Colin Crowley	Castlehaven	1-04	7
2004	Jack Ferriter	Bishopstown	0-04	4
2005	James Masters	Nemo Rangers	0-06	6
2006	James Masters	Nemo Rangers	1-06	9
2007	Paul Kerrigan	Nemo Rangers	0-07	7
2008	Paul Kerrigan	Nemo Rangers	0-05	5
2009	Fionán Murray	St. Finbarr's	0-05	5
2010	Paul Kerrigan	Nemo Rangers	1-03	6
2011	Daithí Casey	UCC	1-04	7
2012	Donncha O'Connor	Duhallow	0-04	4
2013	Brian Hurley	Castlehaven	0-12	12
2014	Cian Dorgan	Ballincollig	0-06	6
2015	Brian Hurley (D)	Castlehaven	0-04	4
2015	Paul Kerrigan (R)	Nemo Rangers	0-04	4
2015	Barry O'Driscoll (R)	Nemo Rangers	1-01	4
2016	Cian Dorgan	Ballincollig	1-07	10
2017	Steven Sherlock (D)	St. Finbarr's	0-08	8
2017	Steven Sherlock (R)	St. Finbarr's	2-07	13
2018	Steven Sherlock	St. Finbarr's	1-08	11
2019	Luke Connolly	Nemo Rangers	2-04	10
2020	Brian Hurley	Castlehaven	0-08	8
2021	Steven Sherlock	St. Finbarr's	0-07	7

== See also ==
- List of Cork Senior Football Championship winners
- Cork Premier Senior Hurling Championship
- Cork Senior A Football Championship
- Munster Senior Club Football Championship
