= Ó Scannail =

The surname Ó Scannail (English: Scannell) is both an ancient Irish name and a clan who were a sept of the Eóganachta. The name derives from the Irish word scannal, originally meaning quarrel, contention, fight, or dispute.

== Etymology ==
There are three distinct septs of the Scannail, the first and primary sept being the clan Ó Scannail (Scannell) (originally Scannal), who belong to West Munster and specifically the Counties of Kerry, Cork, and Limerick. The other two septs derived from Ó Scannail, and their descendants are now known as Scanlan and Scanlon. One sept is O'Scannlain of Munster and the other is MacScannlain of Oriel, County Louth, neither of which has retained the prefix 0 or Mac in modern times. The latter are perpetuated in the placename Ballymacscanlon near Dundalk. The widespread distribution of these names is indicated by the fact that there are six Ballyscanlans in Ireland as well as a Scanlansland and a Scanlan's Island. Two of these are in County Clare and one in Mayo, which lends colour to the statement that there was also a North Connacht Sept of O'Scanlan.

The Annals of the Four Masters suggests the first known instance of the use of the name Scannal, recording that in the year 580, Ferghus Scannal, the King of Munster, was slain (although the date of his death is recorded elsewhere as the year 582). The Annals also write that in the year 665, Maelcaeich, son of Scannal, chief of the Cruithne of Dal Araidhe of the race of Ir died, as did Maelduin, son of Scannal, chief of Cinel Coirbre. The Annals show the extent to which the family's ancestors were involved in disputes and battles, noting that in the year 679 (although recorded in the Annals of Tigernach as the year 681), Dunghal, son of Scannal, chief of the Cruithni, and Ceannfaeladh, son of Suibhne, chief of Cianachta Glinne Geimhin, were burned by Maelduin, son of Maelfithrigh, at Dun Ceithirn. The Annals note the Scannal name being associated with a number of early Christian figures in Ireland, noting the deaths of Scannal, abbot, successor of Cainneach (in the year 775); Fearadhach, son of Scannal, scribe and Abbot of Achadh Bo Cainnigh (in the year 808); and Scannal, Bishop of Kildare (in the year 881).

One of the earliest recorded written spellings of the family name is thought to be that of Máel Patraic Ua Scannail (also called Patrick O'Scannell), and dated 1262 - 1272, when he was Bishop of Raphoe and afterwards of Armagh. However, the first half of the Annals of Tigernach which also records the name Scannal, may have been written earlier and thus could be an earlier written record of the name. The Annals of the Four Masters (which was compiled in the 1600s) note that in 1262, Archbishop Ó Scannail said Mass in a pallium (in the Octave of John the Baptist), at Armagh, and the Annals also record the spelling of the name as O'Scannail and O'Scannal. The Annals record that in the year 1270, Maelpatrick O'Scannal, Archbishop of Armagh, "went over to the King of England:..." (Henry III of England) and that "...the King received him honourably; and he returned home with great privileges".

The clan of Scannail were a sept of the Eóganachta. Scannail was a sept of some significance and it is recorded that in 1014, Eocha, son of Dunadbach, Chief of Clann Scannail, and Scannail son of Cathal, Lord of Eóganacht Locha Léin, were killed at the Battle of Clontarf.

The Eóganachta were an Irish dynasty centred on Cashel which dominated southern Ireland from the 7th to the 10th centuries, and following that, in a restricted form, the Kingdom of Desmond, and its offshoot Carbery, well into the 16th century. By tradition the dynasty was founded by Conall Corc but named after his ancestor Éogan, the firstborn son of the semi-mythological 3rd-century king Ailill Aulom. This dynastic clan-name, for it was never in any sense a 'surname,' should more accurately be restricted to those branches of the royal house which descended from Conall Corc, who established Cashel as his royal seat in the late fifth century.

The rule of the Eóganachta in Munster is widely regarded as gentle and more sophisticated in comparison with the other provincial dynasties of Ireland. Not only was Munster the wealthiest of the provinces, but the Eóganachta were willing to concede other previously powerful kingdoms whom they had politically marginalized, such as the Corcu Loígde, considerable status and freedom from tribute, based on their former status as rulers of the province. See Byrne 2001 for an extensive description of the kingdom.

== See also ==
- Scannell
- Mac Scannláin
- Ó Scannláin
- Ó Scealláin
