= Mary Scanlon =

Mary Scanlon may refer to:

- Mary Gay Scanlon (born 1959), U.S. Representative from Pennsylvania
- Mary Scanlon (New Jersey politician) (1924–2002), member of the New Jersey General Assembly
- Mary Scanlon (Scottish politician) (born 1947), member of the Scottish Parliament
