= Jack Scanlon (footballer) =

Australian rules footballer, born 1911

Personal information
- Full name: John Francis Scanlon
- Born: 11 January 1911; Iona, Victoria
- Died: 21 July 1972 (aged 61); Parkville, Victoria
- Original team: Iona
- Height: 180 cm (5 ft 11 in)
- Weight: 83 kg (183 lb)

Playing career^{1}
Years	Club	Games (Goals)
1930–36	St Kilda	67 (14)
1937–40	Coburg (VFA)	39 (25)
- ^{1} Playing statistics correct to the end of 1936.

John Francis Scanlon (11 January 1911 – 21 July 1972) was an Australian rules footballer who played for St Kilda in the Victorian Football League (VFL) during the 1930s.

Scanlon came to St Kilda from Iona and was played mostly as a half back flanker and back pocket. He captained-coached VFA club Coburg from 1937 to 1940 and was non playing coach in 1948. In 1951, he would found the Batman football club, which later go on to be Coburg Districts. He died in 1972. His son, Peter Scanlon, was a VFL/AFL Commissioner from 1985 until 1992.
