= Scanlon (disambiguation) =

Scanlon is a surname of Irish Gaelic origin.

Scanlon may also refer to:

== Places ==
- Scanlon, Minnesota, United States
- Scanlon Farm, an historic site in West Virginia, United States

== Other ==
- 8131 Scanlon, a main-belt asteroid
- Scanlon plan, a gainsharing program
- USS M. J. Scanlon (ID-3513), a US Navy cargo ship in commission from 1918 to 1919

== See also ==
- Atascadero State Hospital v. Scanlon, a 1985 United States Supreme Court case
- Brooks-Scanlon Corporation 1, a steam locomotive in Pennsylvania, USA
- Scanlan (disambiguation)
