= Andy Scannell =

Irish footballer

- Born: Andrew Scannell; 26 February 1905; Ballingeary, County Cork, Ireland
- Died: 3 January 1959 (aged 53); Fermoy, County Cork, Ireland
- Occupation: National school teacher
- Employer: Cork County Board
- Known for: Chairman of the Cork County Board

Andrew Scannell (26 June 1905 – 3 January 1959) was an Irish Gaelic footballer, hurler, team selector and Gaelic games administrator.

Scannell began his administrative career as secretary of the Fermoy club between 1936 and 1939. He served as club chairman from 1940 to 1945 before being elected chairman of the North Cork Board in 1946. At County Board level Scannell served as vice-chairman and chairman at various times between 1947 and 1954. He was later elected to the position of vice-chairman of the Munster Council and served as a delegate to Central Council.

The trophy awarded to the winners of the Cork Senior Football Championship is called the Andy Scannell Cup in his honour.

Sporting positions
| Preceded by Séamus Long | Vice-Chairman of the Cork County Board; 1947-1950 | Succeeded by Con Murphy |
| Preceded by Séamus O'Shea | Chairman of the Cork County Board; 1952-1954 | Succeeded by P. A. Murphy |
