= Frank Clinger Scallan =

Frank Clinger Scallan (1870 – November 1950) was an Anglo-Indian artist and writer who lived in Calcutta. He wrote several works looking at Indian history and was a member of the Calcutta Historical Society.

Scallan was born in Calcutta and was educated at the Calcutta Boys' School. He worked at the Survey of India office. After his retirement he travelled through Europe and studied art at the Académie Julian in Paris under Jean-Paul Laurens (1838–1921). His art works were widely distributed as post cards and he exhibited at the Royal Scottish Academy and received a silver medal at the Calcutta Fine Art Exhibition (1924). His sketches included mainly Indian scenery but he also drew pictures of Venice and Italy. He also helped work out the itinerary of the artists Thomas and William Daniell. The design of the logo of the Astronomical Society of India was made by Scallan.

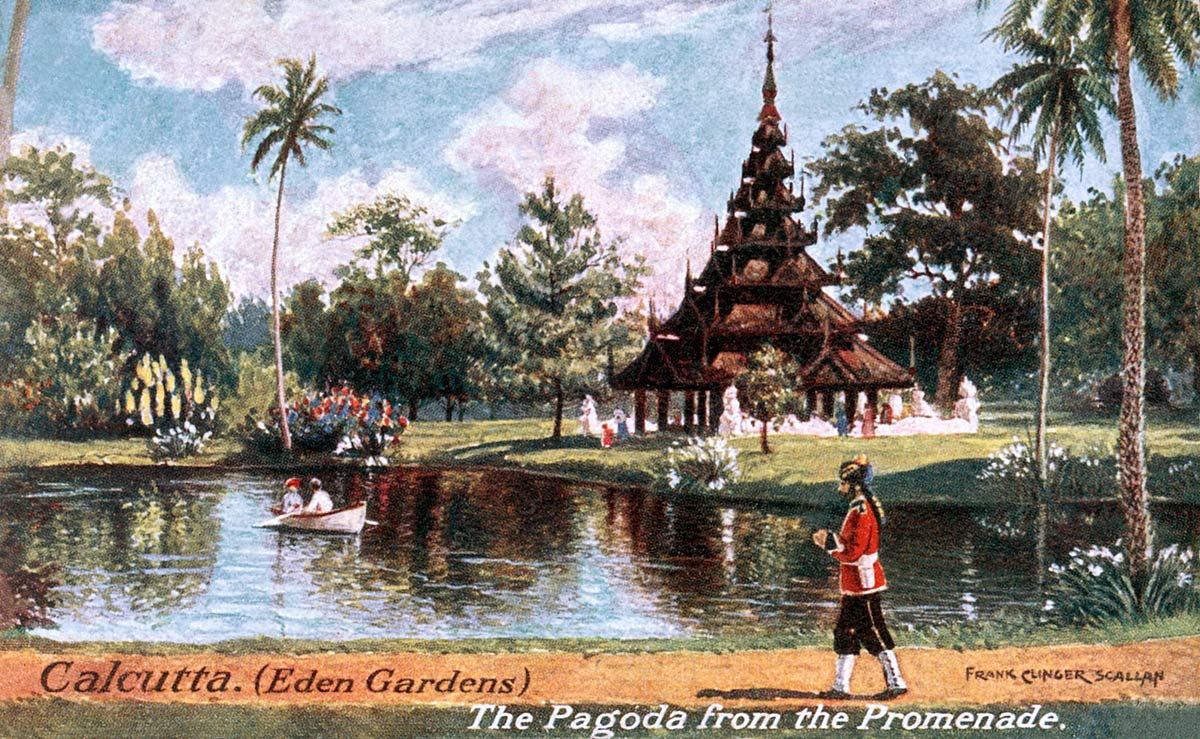
Eden Gardens, Calcutta

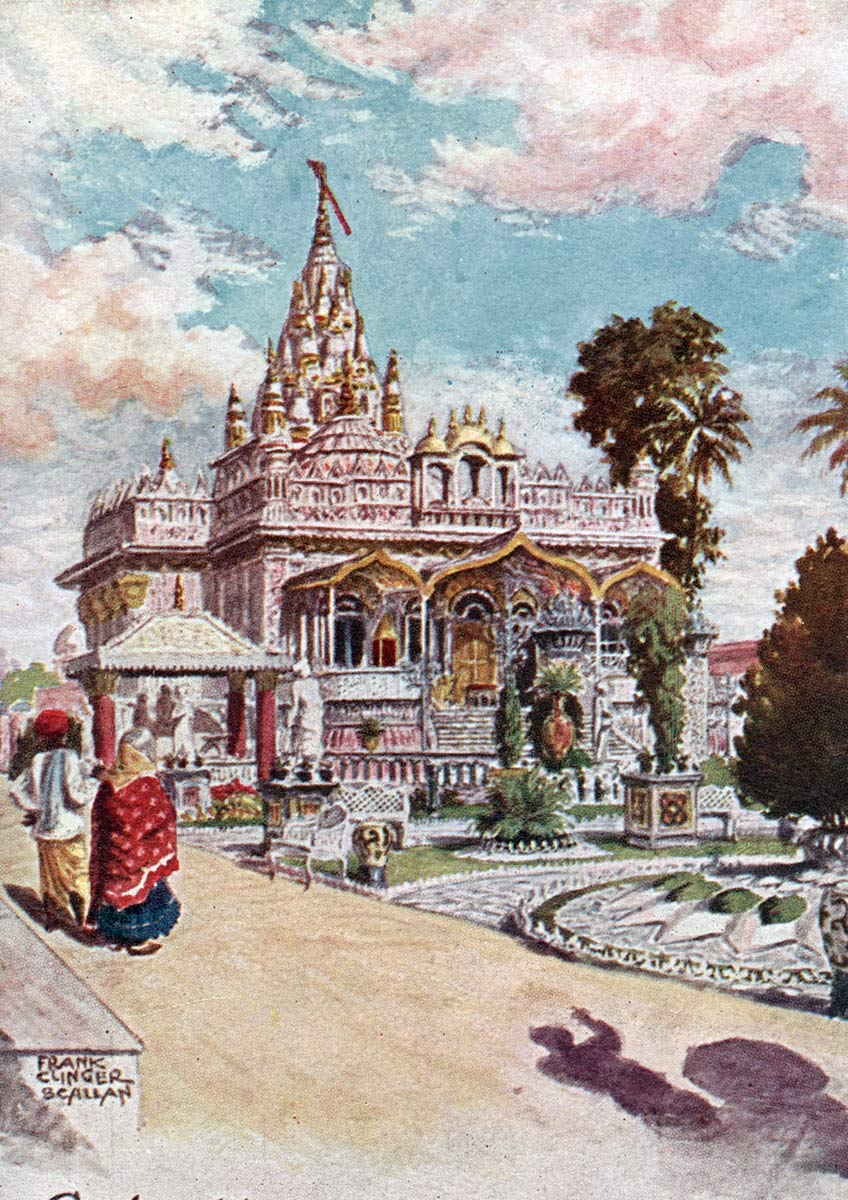
Jain Temple, Calcutta

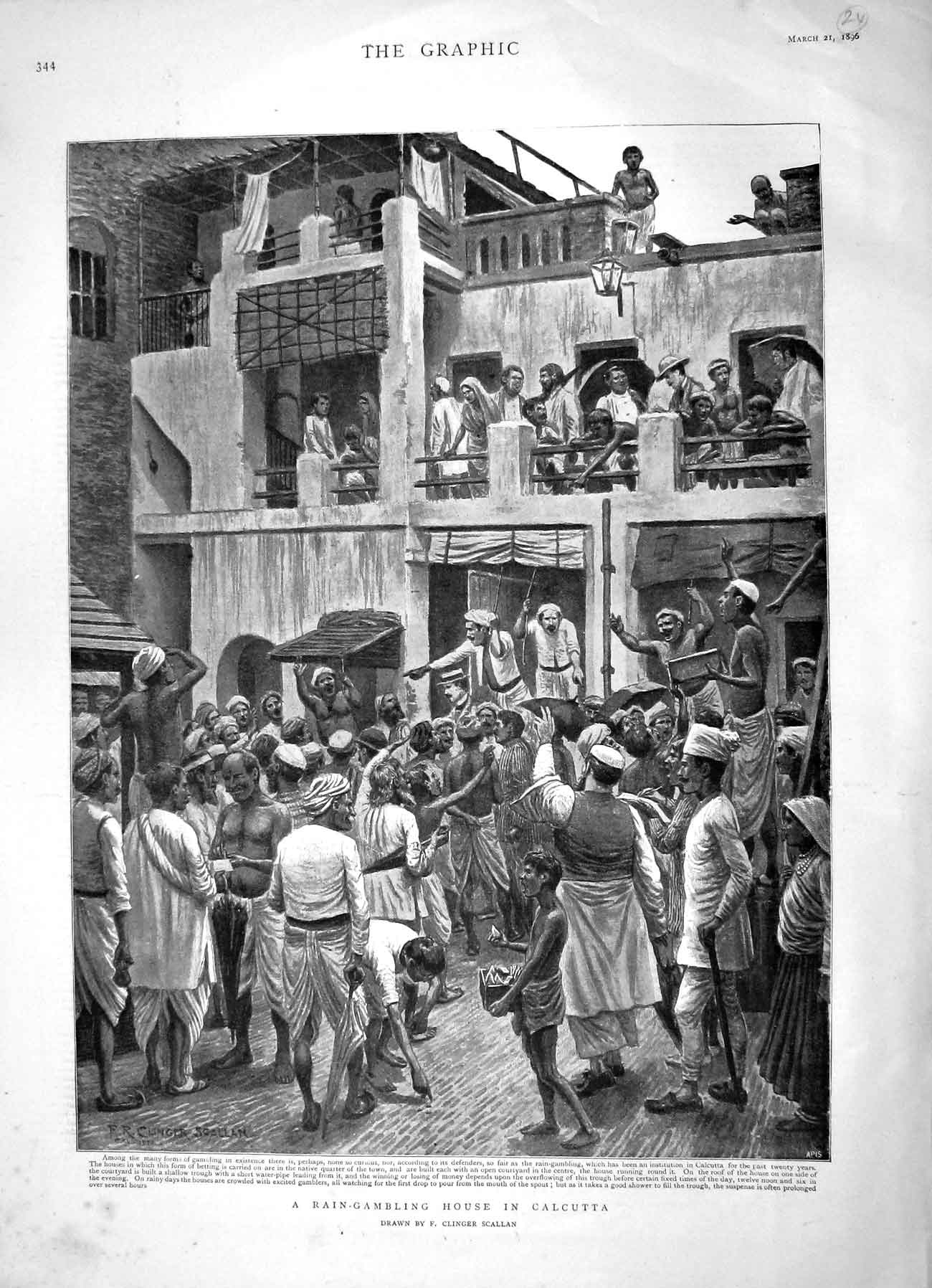
Rain-gambling in Calcutta

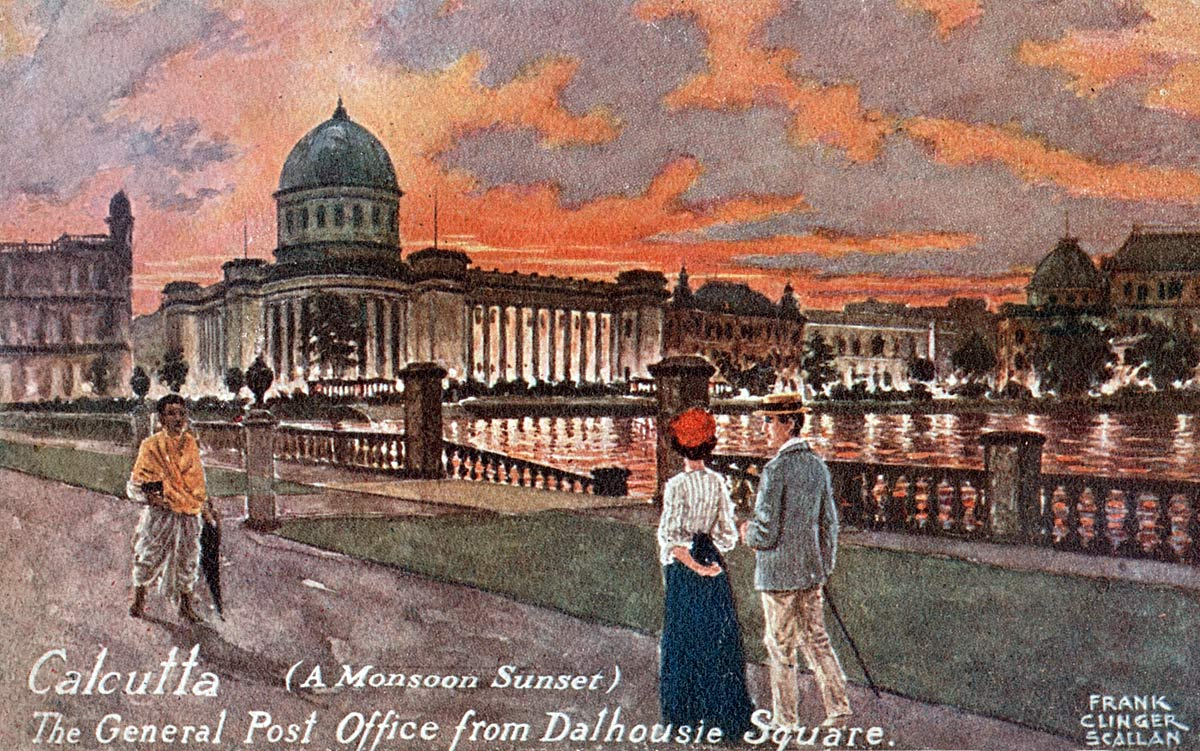
Calcutta postcard
