= J. J. Scannell =

American publisher

John James Scannell was a publisher of biographies that was established in 1917 from Paterson, New Jersey, United States. He died May 9, 1935, in Newfoundland, New Jersey.
