= Seán Scanlan =

Seán Scanlan MRIA
- Born: 1937; Dublin, Ireland
- Died: May 2, 2017; Dublin, Ireland
- Resting place: Shanganagh Cemetery
- Other name: J. O. Scanlan
- Education: University College Dublin; University of Leeds; National University of Ireland
- Spouse: Ann
- Scientific career
- Fields: Electrical engineering

Sean Scanlan MRIA, IEEE Life Fellow (also John Oliver Scanlan; 1937 – 2 May 2017) was an Irish circuit theorist and electronic engineering professor.

== Biography ==
Scanlan studied electrical engineering at University College Dublin (UCD) and received the Bachelor of Engineering degree in 1959. He then worked at Mullard Research Laboratories in Redhill, Surrey, and continued his studies at the University of Leeds, where he received a PhD in 1966. He became the Chair of Electronic Engineering at Leeds two years later. In 1972, Scanlan earned a Doctor of Science from the National University of Ireland. From 1973 to 2002, he was the Chair of Electronic Engineering at UCD and was the first person in that role.

Scanlan's areas of research included electronic circuit and system design, digital circuits and computing, signal processing, digital filters and switched-capacitor filters. He also made contributions to the theory of high frequency transistor amplifiers and oscillators, as well as tunnel diode amplifiers. His later work included research into lumped networks, and distributed-element circuit.

Scanlan was president of the Royal Irish Academy (RIA) from 1993 to 1996 and a life fellow of the Institute of Electrical and Electronics Engineers (IEEE). He was awarded an RIA Gold Medal and the Golden Jubilee Medal of the IEEE Circuits and Systems Society.
