= Máel Patraic Ua Scannail =

13th-century Irish bishop

Máel Patraic Ua Scannail or Patrick Ó Scannail (sometimes Patrick O'Scanlan) was an Irish Roman Catholic cleric. He served as Bishop of Raphoe, and later as Archbishop of Armagh and Primate of All Ireland from 1262 to 1272.

In 1268 he laid out designs for the expansion of St. Patrick's Cathedral, Armagh (the structure now used by the Anglican Church of Ireland). The cathedral survives substantially to his plan.

The Annals of the Four Masters (which was compiled in the 1600s) note that in 1262, he said Mass in a pallium (in the Octave of John the Baptist), at Armagh. The Annals record that in the year 1270, Archbishop O'Scannail, when he was Archbishop of Armagh, "went over to the King of England [ Edward I of England, known as Edward Longshanks]: the King received him honourably; and he returned home with great privileges".
