= 2024 North Cork Junior A Hurling Championship =

Annual Hurling competition season

- Dates: 3 August - 20 October 2024
- Teams: 12
- Sponsor: Hibernian Hotel
- Champions: Killavullen (1st title); Liam Cronin (captain)
- Runners-up: Harbour Rovers; Seán Finn (captain)
- Relegated: Ballyhea

Tournament statistics
- Matches played: 23
- Goals scored: 66 (2.87 per match)
- Points scored: 784 (34.09 per match)
- Top scorer(s): Stephen Condon (7-56)

The 2024 North Cork Junior A Hurling Championship was the 100th staging of the North Cork Junior A Hurling Championship since its establishment by the North Cork Board in 1925. The draw for the group stage placings took place on 13 February 2024. The championship ran from 3 August to 26 October 2024.

Harbour Rovers were the defending champions.

The final was played on 26 October 2024 at the Kildorrery Grounds, between Harbour Rovers and Killavullen, in what was their first ever meeting in the final. Both sides previously met in the group stage. Killavullen won the match by 2-19 to 2-18 to claim their first ever championship title.

Stephen Condon was the championship's top scorer with 7-56.

== Group 1 ==
=== Group 1 table ===
Semi-finalists Quarter-finalists

Team	Matches				Score			Pts
Team	Pld	W	D	L	For	Against	Diff	Pts
Lis/Churchtown Gaels	3	3	0	0	79	42	37	6
Ballyhooly	3	2	0	1	65	53	12	4
Shanballymore	3	1	0	2	44	67	-23	2
Fermoy	3	0	0	3	49	75	-26	0

=== Group 1 results ===
3 August 2024 Round 1	Ballyhooly	1-21 - 0-14	Shanballymore	Castletownroche Grounds
	B Lombard 0-7, D Whelan 1-2, E Twomey 0-3, D Collins 0-2, K Kiely 0-2, D O'Reilly 0-2, D Roche 0-2, D Linehan 0-1.	Report	E O'Regan 0-4, D O'Callaghan 0-3, J Twomey 0-3, S Looney 0-2, D Palmer 0-1, N Barry 0-1.

4 August 2024 Round 1	Liscarroll/Churchtown Gaels	4-21 - 1-10	Fermoy	Mallow GAA Complex
	M Hedigan 2-3, J Hudner 1-2, C O'Brien 0-5, O O'Callaghan 1-1, S Delee 0-4, K Daly 0-3, M Thompson 0-1, S Killeen 0-1, B O'Connor 0-1.		Craig Roche 0-6, C Barry 1-0, D O'Brien 0-1, J Murray 0-1, G O'Callaghan 0-1, P Shanahan 0-1.

25 August 2024 Round 2	Shanballymore	0-09 - 1-21	Liscarroll/Churchtown Gaels	Fr Con Buckley Park
	J Twomey 0-4, J Sheedy 0-3, D O'Callaghan 0-1, B O'Grady 0-1.		C O'Brien 0-14, J Hudner 1-0, M Hedigan 0-2, K Daly 0-1, S Delee 0-1, J Quinn 0-1, V Daly 0-1, D Relihan 0-1.

26 August 2024 Round 2	Fermoy	1-14 - 0-21	Ballyhooly	Glanwoth Grounds
		Report	B Lombard 0-8, D Linehan 0-5, D Whelan 0-4, G Roche 0-2, K Kiely 0-1, D Collins 0-1.

8 September 2024 Round 3	Fermoy	2-13 - 4-09	Shanballymore	Ballygiblin Grounds

8 September 2024 Round 3	Liscarroll/Churchtown Gaels	0-22 - 0-20	Ballyhooly	Dr Croke Park
	C O'Brien 0-14, M Heddigan 0-3, K Daly 0-1, O O'Callaghan 0-1, J Hudner 0-1, J Quinn 0-1, S Heddigan 0-1.	Report	B Lombard 0-11, S Roche 0-2, D Whelan 0-2, D Roche 0-1, D O'Reilly 0-1, D Collins 0-1, K Kiely 0-1, B Johnson 0-1.

== Group 2 ==
=== Group 2 table ===
Semi-finalists Quarter-finalists Relegation playoff

Team	Matches				Score			Pts
Team	Pld	W	D	L	For	Against	Diff	Pts
Dromina	3	3	0	0	82	50	32	6
Clyda Rovers	3	2	0	1	67	40	27	4
Kilshannig	3	1	0	2	59	57	2	2
Ballyhea	3	0	0	3	26	87	-61	0

=== Group 2 results ===
3 August 2024 Round 1	Ballyhea	0-10 - 2-15	Kilshannig	Churchtown Grounds
	M Mortell 0-8, J Barrett 0-1, G O'Shea 0-1.		Diarmuid O'Sullivan 2-3, P Walsh 0-6, S Lyons 0-1, Darragh O'Sullivan 0-1, C Murphy 0-1, M Twomey 0-1, E O'Hanlon 0-1, J O'Hanlon 0-1.

4 August 2024 Round 1	Dromina	1-16 - 1-14	Clyda Rovers	Gaels Memorial Grounds
	D Jones 1-7, C Dunne 0-2, J Murphy 0-2, L Barrett 0-1, Jordan Morrissey 0-1, K Hayes 0-1, Jack Morrissey 0-1, P Hassett 0-1.	Report	S O'Sullivan 0-10, C Flanagan 1-0, K Graham 0-2, D Buckley 0-1, C Buckley 0-1.

16 August 2024 Round 2	Ballyhea	0-08 - 2-24	Dromina	Páirc Mhic Ghiobúin
	D Crowley 0-4, M Mortell 0-3, C Crowley 0-1.		C Dunne 0-9, J Murphy 1-5, B Buckley 1-3, D Jones 0-3, J Morrissey 0-2, P Hassett 0-1, D O'Connell 0-1.

24 August 2024 Round 3	Clyda Rovers	2-30 - 0-08	Ballyhea	Dr Croke Park
	C Flanagan 0-4, S O'Sullivan 1-11, C Buckley 1-3, K Graham 0-4, T Barrett 0-3, D Walsh 0-2, D Buckley 0-1, A Kelly 0-1.	Report

24 August 2024 Round 3	Kilshannig	2-19 - 4-21	Dromina	Dr Mannix Sportsfield
	P Walsh 1-8, J Murphy 1-0, Darragh O'Sullivan 0-3, E O'Sullivan 0-2, S Lyons 0-2, C Murphy 0-1, Diarmuid O'Sullivan 0-1, D Clogan 0-1, B Curtin 0-1.		K Cagney 2-1, C Dunne 1-7, B Buckley 0-7, J Murphy 1-1, L Bennett 0-2, G Hayes 0-1, D O'Connell 0-1, P Hassett 0-1.

6 September 2024 Round 2	KIlshannig	0-13 - 0-14	Clyda Rovers	Mill Field
	Diarmuid O'Sullivan 0-3, K Twomey 0-3, S Lyons 0-2, C Murphy 0-1, D Clogan 0-1, P Walsh 0-1, Darragh O'Sullivan 0-1, B Curtin 0-1.		S O'Sullivan 0-6, N Burke 0-2, D Walsh 0-2, K Fitzgerald 0-1, C Flanagan 0-1, C Buckley 0-1, C Kenny 0-1.

== Group 3 ==
=== Group 3 table ===
Quarter-finalists Relegation playoff

Team	Matches				Score			Pts
Team	Pld	W	D	L	For	Against	Diff	Pts
Harbour Rovers	3	2	1	0	79	54	25	5
Killavullen	3	2	0	1	78	63	15	4
Charleville	3	1	1	1	77	69	8	3
Araglen	3	0	0	3	48	96	-48	0

=== Group 3 results ===
3 August 2024 Round 1	Killavullen	3-22 - 1-13	Araglen	Kildorrery Grounds
	P O'Sullivan 1-4, J Magner 0-7, M O'Connor 1-3, E Cotter 1-1, C O'Mahony 0-2, L Cronin 0-1, L Fox 0-1, J O'Connor 0-1, P O'Grady 0-1, P Looney 0-1.	Report	C Twomey 0-9, F Hickey 1-0, J Kearney 0-3, A Hegarty 0-1.

4 August 2024 Round 1	Harbour Rovers	2-15 - 0-21	Charleville	Páirc Uí Shíocháin
	S Condon 1-14, Darragh O'Brien 1-0, D Pyne 0-1.	Report	D O'Riordan 0-10, S Bresnan 0-3, S Liddy 0-2, M Kavanagh 0-2, K O'Gorman 0-1, Z Biggane 0-1, K Cagney 0-1, J O'Brien 0-1.

25 August 2024 Round 2	Araglen	0-13 - 5-19	Harbour Rovers	Ballygiblin Grounds
	C Twomey 0-9, F Hickey 0-3, S Hegarty 0-1.		D O'Brien 2-3, S Condon 1-5, E Sheehan 1-1, T McGrath 1-1, P Hannon 0-3, D Pyne 0-2, J Fogarty 0-1, J Fitzgibbon 0-1, H McGrath 0-1, M Wade 0-1.

27 August 2024 Round 2	Charleville	1-22 - 5-12	Killavullen	Fr Con Buckley Park
	D O'Riordan 1-12, Z Biggane 0-3, K Cagney 0-2, J O'Brien 0-2, B Forde 0-1, G Gleeson 0-1, S Gleeson 0-1.		M O'Connor 2-1, J Magner 1-4, L Cronin 1-1, C Looney 1-0, E Cotter 0-2, J O'Connor 0-2, L Fox 0-1, B Cotter 0-1.

7 September 2024 Round 3	Araglen	0-21 - 2-25	Charleville	Shanballymore Grounds
			K O'Gorman 0-12, K Cagney 0-6, M Kavanagh 1-0, J Jones 1-0, S Bresnan 0-3, S Liddy 0-1, M O'Flynn 0-1, Z Biggane 0-1, B Forde 0-1.

7 September 2024 Round 3	Killavullen	1-17 - 2-18	Harbour Rovers	Castletownroche Grounds
	J Magner 0-7, C Looney 1-0, P O'Grady 0-2, J O'Connor 0-2, M O'Connor 0-2, P O'Sullivan 0-1, E Cotter 0-1, L Fox 0-1, P Looney 0-1.	Report	S Condon 1-12, Darragh O'Brien 1-2, J O'Sullivan 0-2, Diarmuid O'Brien 0-2.

== Knockout stage ==
=== Bracket ===
Quarter-Finals
Harbour Rovers	1-20
Ballyhooly	1-18
Clyda Rovers	1-14
Killavullen	0-18

Semi-Finals
Dromina	4-18
Harbour Rovers	2-26 (aet)
Liscarroll Churchtown Gaels	2-18
Killavullen	2-21

Final
Harbour Rovers
Killavullen

=== Relegation playoff ===
12 October 2024 Quarter-final	Araglen	3-18 - 0-08	Ballyhea	Shanballymore Grounds

=== Quarter-finals ===
21 September 2024 Quarter-final	Clyda Rovers	1-14 - 0-18	Killavullen	O'Connell Park
	S O'Sullivan 0-6, C Buckley 0-4, K Graham 1-0, K Coffey 0-1, D Walsh 0-1.	Report	J Magner 0-10, J O'Connor 0-4, P O'Sullivan 0-2, M Cagney 0-1, C O'Mahony 0-1.

22 September 2024 Quarter-final	Harbour Rovers	1-20 - 1-18	Ballyhooly	Castletownroche Grounds
	S Condon 0-9, Darragh O'Brien 1-2, P Hannon 0-3, D Pyne 0-3, P Condon 0-1, S Finn 0-1, T McGrath 0-1.	Report	B Lombard 0-10, G Roche 1-0, S Roche 0-3, D O'Reilly 0-2, S Linehan 0-1, D Collins 0-1, D Linehan 0-1.

=== Semi-finals ===
6 October 2024 Semi-final	Dromina	4-18 - 2-26 (aet)	Harbour Rovers	Fr Con Buckley Park
	C Dunne 0-9, D Jones 2-0, K Cagney 1-2, R Morrissey 1-0, P Hassett 0-2, L Barrett 0-2, K Aherne 0-1, G Hayes 0-1, J Murphy 0-1.		S Condon 2-7, P Hannon 0-12, M Wade 0-2, D Pyne 0-1, P Condon 0-1, Darragh O'Brien 0-1, M Blackburn 0-1, Diarmuid O'Brien 0-1.

6 October 2024 Semi-final	Liscarroll/Churchtown Gaels	2-18 - 2-21	Killavullen	O'Connell Park
	C O'Brien 0-9, J Quinn 1-0, E Barrett 1-0, O O'Callaghan 0-2, K Daly 0-2, S Delee 0-2, M Heddigan 0-1, V Daly 0-1, S Killeen 0-1.		C O'Mahony 1-4, J Magner 0-6, L Fox 1-1, E Buckley 0-2, C Looney 0-2, L Cronin 0-1, M Cagney 0-1, E Cotter 0-1, P Looney 0-1, M O'Connor 0-1.

=== Final ===
26 October 2024 Final	Harbour Rovers	2-18 - 2-19	Killavullen	Kildorrery Grounds
	S Condon 2-9 (1-0 pen, 0-2 sl, 0-1f) P Hannon 0-5 (0-4 f), T McGrath, Darragh O'Brien, P Condon, Diarmuid O'Brien 0-1 each.	Report	J Magner 0-8 (0-6 f), P Looney 1-3, C O'Mahony 1-0, L Cronin 0-2 (0-1 f), E Cotter, P O'Sullivan 0-2 each, M Cagney, L Fox 0-1 each.	Referee: D Twomey (Shanballymore)

== Championship statistics ==
=== Top scorers ===
Rank	Player	County	Tally	Total	Matches	Average
1	Stephen Condon	Harbour Rovers	7-56	77	6	12.83
2	Jamie Magner	Killavullen	1-42	45	6	7.50
3	Colin O'Brien	L/C Gaels	0-42	42	4	10.50
4	Seán O'Sullivan	Clyda Rovers	1-33	36	4	9.00
4	Brian Lombard	Ballyhooly	1-33	36	4	9.00

=== Miscellaneous ===
- Killavullen qualified for the final for the first time since 1929.
