= 2023 North Cork Junior A Hurling Championship =

Annual Hurling competition season

- Dates: 4 August - 15 October 2023
- Teams: 12
- Sponsor: Hibernian Hotel
- Champions: Harbour Rovers (4th title); Eric O'Donoghue (captain); Dennis Healy (manager)
- Runners-up: Kilshannig; Bill Curtin (captain); Jim O'Sullivan (manager)

Tournament statistics
- Matches played: 22
- Goals scored: 64 (2.91 per match)
- Points scored: 681 (30.95 per match)
- Top scorer(s): Stephen Condon (2-57)

The 2023 North Cork Junior A Hurling Championship was the 99th staging of the North Cork Junior A Hurling Championship since its establishment by the North Cork Board in 1925. The draw for the group stage placings took place on 1 February 2023. The championship ran from 4 August to 14 October 2023.

Kilshannig entered the championship as the defending champions.

The final was played on 14 October 2023 at the Castletownroche Grounds, between Harbour Rovers and Kilshannig, in what was their second meeting in the final overall and a first meeting in three years. Harbour Rovers won the match by 1–16 to 0–16 to claim their fourth championship title overall and a first title in three years.

Stephen Condon was the championship's top scorer with 2-57.

== Group 1 ==
=== Group 1 table ===
Knockout stage

Team	Matches				Score			Pts
Team	Pld	W	D	L	For	Against	Diff	Pts
Kilshannig	3	3	0	0	70	43	27	6
Killavullen	3	2	0	1	61	53	8	4
Dromina	3	1	0	2	49	57	-8	2
Charleville	3	0	0	3	51	78	-27	0

=== Group 1 results ===
4 August 2023 Round 1	Killavullen	0-15 - 1-13	Kilshannig	Mourneabbey Grounds
	J Magner 0-10, P Looney 0-3, D O'Grady 0-1, P O'Sullivan 0-1.		J Twomey 0-8, D Twomey 1-0, B Curtin 0-1, J Kearney 0-1, T Cunningham 0-1, Diarmuid O'Sullivan 0-1, Evan O'Sullivan 0-1.

6 August 2023 Round 1	Dromina	0-21 - 0-14	Charleville	Churchtown Grounds
	D Jones 0-17, D Buckley 0-2, B Buckley 0-1, J Hayes 0-1.		K Cagney 0-7, DJ Collins 0-3, S Liddy 0-2, J O'Brien 0-1, G Gleeson 0-1.

12 August 2023 Round 2	Kilshannig	3-14 - 0-11	Dromina	Páirc Uí Shíocháin
	J Twomey 1-7, E O'Sullivan 1-1, J Kearney 1-1, P Walsh 0-3, C Murphy 0-1, D Murphy 0-1.		D Jones 0-4, D Buckley 0-3, K Cagney 0-3, P Hassett 0-1.

13 August 2023 Round 2	Charleville	1-17 - 2-20	Killavullen	Dr Croke Park
	K Cagney 0-9, DJ Collins 1-3, J O'Brien 0-2, G Gleeson 0-2, S Liddy 0-1.		J Magner 1-11, M O'Connor 1-1, D O'Grady 0-3, P Looney 0-1, L Cronin 0-1, E Buckley 0-1, C Lillis 0-1, P O'Grady 0-1.

2 September 2023 Round 3	Dromina	0-17 - 0-20	Killavullen	Shanballymore Grounds
	D Jones 0-12, D O'Connell 0-1, L Morrissey 0-1, B Buckley 0-1, R Morrissey 0-1, L Barrett 0-1.		J Magner 0-15, P O'Grady 0-2, E Cotter 0-1, P O'Sullivan 0-1, L Cronin 0-1.

2 September 2023 Round 3	Charleville	0-17 - 3-22	Kilshannig	Páirc Uí Shíocháin
	K Cagney 0-6, B Forde 0-4, J Coughlan 0-3, D O'Neill 0-1, J O'Brien 0-1, M Kavanagh 0-1, DJ Collins 0-1.		J Twomey 1-10, Diarmuid O'Sullivan 1-1, P Walsh 1-1, D Twomey 0-3, E O'Hanlon 0-3, K Twomey 0-1, C O'Shea 0-1, J Kearney 0-1.

== Group 2 ==
=== Group 2 table ===
Knockout stage

Team	Matches				Score			Pts
Team	Pld	W	D	L	For	Against	Diff	Pts
Liscarroll/Churchtown Gaels	3	3	0	0	80	48	32	6
Clyda Rovers	3	2	0	1	72	48	24	4
Ballyhea	3	1	0	2	37	58	-21	2
Buttevant	3	0	0	3	22	57	-35	0

=== Group 2 result ===
5 August 2023 Round 1	Buttevant	1-08 - 5-13	Liscarroll/Churchtown Gaels	Páirc Uí Shíocháin
	C O'Toole 1-4, M Lenahan 0-2, K Lenahan 0-1, S O'Callaghan 0-1.		C O'Brien 3-7, D Fehin 1-0, S Hedigan 1-0, J Quinn 0-2, S Killeen 0-1, J Hudner 0-1, E Barrett 0-1, R Fallon 0-1.

6 August 2023 Round 1	Clyda Rovers	4-14 - 1-14	Ballyhea	Dr Croke Park
	S O'Sullivan 2-1, K Coffey 0-7, C Corbett 1-2, B Nyhan 1-1, D Walsh 0-2, C Buckley 0-1.		S O'Kelly 0-8, L O'Shea 1-0, R Hanley 0-2, G O'Shea 0-1, M Morrissey 0-1, M Mortell 0-1, S Walsh 0-1.

11 August 2023 Round 2	Clyda Rovers	4-17 - 1-08	Buttevant	Mallow GAA Complex
	C Corbett 2-4, K Coffey 0-7, C Buckley 1-2, C Flanagan 1-0, B Nyhan 0-2, B O'Connor 0-1, D Buckley 0-1.		C O'Toole 1-3, M Lenahan 0-3, K Lenahan 0-2.

13 August 2023 Round 2	Ballyhea	2-14 - 4-20	Liscarroll/Churchtown Gaels	Páirc Mhic Ghiobúin
	R Hanley 1-4, S Walsh 1-4, S O'Kelly 0-4, M Morrissey 0-1, F O'Sullivan 0-1.		C O'Brien 0-9, D Relihan 2-0, R Fallon 1-2, S Hedigan 0-5, D Fehin 1-0, S Delee 0-2, J Quinn 0-1, M Hedigan 0-1.

3 September 2023 Round 3	Clyda Rovers	1-14 - 1-17	Liscarroll/Churchtown Gaels	O'Connell Park
	C Buckley 0-6, B Nyhan 0-5, C Corbett 1-0, E Walsh 0-1, N Burke 0-1, S O'Sullivan 0-1.		C O'Brien 0-7, S Hedigan 1-1, J Hudner 0-2, S Delee 0-1, J Quinn 0-1, A Murphy 0-1, E Murphy 0-1, S Killeen 0-1, V Daly 0-1, D Fehin 0-1.

3 September 2023 Round 3	Ballyhea	w/o - scr.	Buttevant	Páirc Mhic Ghiobúin

== Group 3 ==
=== Group 3 table ===
Knockout stage

Team	Matches				Score			Pts
Team	Pld	W	D	L	For	Against	Diff	Pts
Harbour Rovers	3	2	1	0	83	44	39	5
Ballyhooly	3	2	0	1	69	56	13	4
Shanballymore	3	1	1	1	46	56	-10	3
Araglen	3	0	0	3	40	82	-42	0

=== Group 3 results ===
4 August 2023 Round 1	Harbour Rovers	0-14 - 0-14	Shanballymore	Kildorrery Grounds
	S Condon 0-7, P Hannon 0-4, J O'Sullivan 0-1, E Sheehan 0-1, P Condon 0-1.		J Sheedy 0-6, B O'Reilly 0-3, M Burke 0-2, N Barry 0-1, N Butler 0-1, D Palmer 0-1.

5 August 2023 Round 1	Araglen	1-12 - 1-19	Ballyhooly	Ballygiblin Grounds
	B Carey 0-7, C Twomey 1-1, O Hickey 0-4.		B Lombard 1-10, K Kiely 0-2, F Hess 0-1, D Kiely 0-1, D Collins 0-1, G Roche 0-1, S Roche 0-1, E Twomey 0-1, D Linehan 0-1.

11 August 2023 Round 2	Shanballymore	2-10 - 0-12	Araglen	Kildorrery Grounds
	D Palmer 2-1, B O'Reilly 0-3, J Sheedy 0-3, S Looney 0-2, N Barry 0-1.		B Carey 0-9, S Hegarty 0-1, K O'Gorman 0-1, C Twomey 0-1.

11 August 2023 Round 2	Ballyhooly	1-14 - 2-19	Harbour Rovers	Castletownroche Grounds
	B Lombard 1-6, E Twomey 0-3, K Kiely 0-2, G Roche 0-1, S Roche 0-1, D Collins 0-1.		S Condon 0-12, M Wade 2-0, P Condon 0-2, J O'Sullivan 0-2, D O'Brien 0-1, P Hannon 0-1, T McGrath 0-1.

1 September 2023 Round 3	Shanballymore	1-13 - 2-24	Ballyhooly	Castletownroche Grounds
	J Sheedy 1-4, D Palmer 0-3, B O'Reilly 0-2, C O'Reilly 0-1, C Buckley 0-1, S Looney 0-1, E McHugh 0-1.		B Lombard 1-6, F Hess 1-4, K Kiely 0-3, E Twomey 0-3, D Linehan 0-3, G Roche 0-1, S Roche 0-1, E Buckley 0-1, D Collins 0-1, D Roche 0-1.

1 September 2023 Round 3	Harbour Rovers	5-29 - 0-13	Araglen	Mitchelstown Grounds
	S Condon 2-12, D O'Brien 2-3, J O'Sullivan 1-5, P Hannon 0-4, T Condon 0-3, P Condon 0-1, T McGrath 0-1.

== Knockout stage ==
=== Quarter-finals ===
17 September 2023 Quarter-final	Harbour Rovers	0-17 - 0-11	Killavullen	Castletownroche Grounds
	S Condon 0-9, J O'Sullivan 0-3, P Hannon 0-2, D Pyne 0-1, J Fitzgibbon 0-1, B Gallagher 0-1.		J Magner 0-7, E Cotter 0-1, E Birchill 0-1, L Cronin 0-1, D O'Grady 0-1.

17 September 2023 Quarter-final	Ballyhooly	3-15 - 2-17	Clyda Rovers	Kildorrery Grounds
	B Lombard 3-10, S Roche 0-2, G Roche 0-1, D Linehan 0-1, K Kiely 0-1.		K Coffey 0-9, S O'Sullivan 2-1, C Corbett 0-2, D Walsh 0-2, J Buckley 0-1, C Flanagan 0-1, B Nyhan 0-1.

=== Semi-finals ===
30 September 2023 Semi-final	Harbour Rovers	2-17 - 0-14	Liscarroll/Churchtown Gaels	Mallow GAA Complex
	S Condon 0-8, D Pyne 1-2, B Gallagher 1-1, P Hannon 0-4, T McGrath 0-1, J O'Sullivan 0-1.		C O'Brien 0-9, S Hedigan 0-2, S Killeen 0-1, R Fallon 0-1, J Quinn 0-1.

1 October 2023 Semi-final	Kilshannig	3-16 - 4-09	Ballyhooly	Mill Field
	J Twomey 2-8, K O'Hanlon 1-2, Darragh O'Sullivan 0-2, Diarmuid O'Sullivan 0-1, J Kearney 0-1, P Walsh 0-1, D Twomey 0-1.		D Kiely 2-0, D Roche 1-0, T Crowley 1-0, B Lombard 0-3, S Roche 0-1, G Roche 0-1, F Hess 0-1, D Linehan 0-1, K Kiely 0-1, D Collins 0-1.

=== Final ===
14 October 2023 Final	Harbour Rovers	1-16 - 0-16	Kilshannig	Castletownroche Grounds
	S Condon 0- 9 (0-5 f, 0-1 65, 0-1 sl), B Gallagher 1-1 P Hannon, T Condon 0-2 each, D Pyne, P Condon 0-1 each.	Report	J Twomey 0-9 (0-5 f), J Kearney, P Walsh 0-2 each, Evan O'Sullivan, K Twomey (sl), 0-1 each.	Referee: C O'Regan (Ballyhea)

== Championship statistics ==
=== Top scorers ===
Overall

Rank	Player	County	Tally	Total	Matches	Average
1	Stephen Condon	Harbour Rovers	2-57	63	6	10.50
2	Jack Towmey	Kilshannig	4-42	54	5	10.80
3	Brian Lombard	Ballyhooly	6-35	53	5	10.60
4	Jamie Magner	Killavullen	1-43	46	4	11.50
5	Colin O'Brien	L/C Gaels	3-32	41	4	10.25

Single game

Rank	Player	Club	Tally	Total	Opposition
1	Brian Lombard	Ballyhooly	3-10	19	Clyda Rovers
2	Stephen Condon	Harbour Rovers	2-12	18	Araglen
3	Davy Jones	Dromina	0-17	17	Charleville
4	Colin O'Brien	L/C Gaels	3-07	16	Buttevant
5	Jamie Magner	Killavullen	0-15	15	Dromina
6	Jack Towmey	Kilshannig	2-08	14	Ballyhooly
6	Jamie Magner	Killavullen	1-11	14	Charleville
8	Brian Lombard	Ballyhooly	1-10	13	Araglen
8	Jack Towmey	Kilshannig	1-10	13	Charleville
10	Stephen Condon	Harbour Rovers	0-12	12	Ballyhooly
10	Davy Jones	Dromina	0-12	12	Killavullen
