= 2021 Cork Junior A Hurling Championship =

- Dates: 6–20 November 2021
- Teams: 7
- Sponsor: Co-Op Superstores
- Champions: Ballygiblin (1st title); Fionn Herlihy (captain); Ronan Dwane (manager)
- Runners-up: Dromtarriffe; Jack Murphy (captain); John Howard (manager)

Tournament statistics
- Matches played: 6
- Goals scored: 11 (1.83 per match)
- Points scored: 172 (28.67 per match)
- Top scorer(s): Séamus Harnedy (1-18)

The 2021 Cork Junior A Hurling Championship was the 124th staging of the Cork Junior A Hurling Championship since its establishment by the Cork County Board in 1895. The championship began on 6 November 2021 and ended on 20 November 2021.

The final was played on 20 November 2021 at Páirc Uí Rinn in Cork, between Ballygiblin and Dromtarriffe, in what was their first ever meeting in a final. Ballygiblin won the match by 2–18 to 0–18 to claim their first championship title.

Séamus Harnedy was the championship's top scorer with 1–18.

== Qualification ==
Division	Championship	Champions	#
Avondhu	North Cork Junior A Hurling Championship	Ballygiblin	
Carbery	South West Junior A Hurling Championship	Ballinascarthy	
Carrigdhoun	South East Junior A Hurling Championship	Ballymartle	
Duhallow	Duhallow Junior A Hurling Championship	Dromtarriffe	
Imokilly	East Cork Junior A Hurling Championship	St Ita's	
Muskerry	Mid Cork Junior A Hurling Championship	Ballinora	
Seandún	City Junior A Hurling Championship	Passage	

=== Duhallow Junior A Hurling Championship ===
Group A

Pos	Team	Pld	W	D	L	Diff	Pts	Qualification
1	Dromtarriffe	2	2	0	0	+12	4	Advance to Knockout Stage
2	Millstreet	2	2	0	0	+20	4	Advance to Knockout Stage
3	Banteer	2	0	0	2	-4	0	
4	Kanturk	2	0	0	2	-28	0	

Dromtarriffe 1-23 - 2-11 Kanturk

Banteer 0-15 - 0-16 Millstreet

Dromtarriffe 0-17 - 1-11 Banteer

Kanturk 0-11 - 2-24 Millstreet

Group B

Pos	Team	Pld	W	D	L	Diff	Pts	Qualification
1	Newmarket	2	2	0	0	+9	4	Advance to Knockout Stage
2	Kilbrin	2	1	0	1	+13	2	Advance to Knockout Stage
3	Castlemagner	2	0	0	2	-22	0	

Newmarket 0-19 - 2-11 Kilbrin

Castlemagner 2-09 - 0-22 Newmarket

Kilbrin 2-24 - 0-15 Castlemagner

Knockout Stage

Semi-Finals
Dromtarriffe	2-26
Kilbrin	1-17
Newmarket	0-15
Millstreet	1-17

Final
Dromtarriffe	2-18
Millstreet	1-14

=== North Cork Junior A Hurling Championship ===
Group A

Pos	Team	Pld	W	D	L	Diff	Pts	Qualification
1	Dromina	3	2	1	0	+28	5	Advance to Knockout Stage
2	Kilshannaig	3	2	1	0	+8	5	Advance to Knockout Stage
3	Liscarroll-Churchtown Gaels	3	1	0	2	-8	2	
4	Shanballymore	3	0	0	3	-28	0	

Dromina 4-19 - 1-09 Shanballymore

Kilshannig 4-14 - 2-13 LC Gaels

LC Gaels 2-15 - 0-13 Shanballymore

Dromina 1-18 - 3-12 Kilshannig

Kilshannig 1-14 - 0-16 Shanballymore

LC Gaels 1-11 - 2-17 Dromina

Group B

Pos	Team	Pld	W	D	L	Diff	Pts	Qualification
1	Ballygiblin	3	2	1	0	+25	5	Advance to Knockout Stage
2	Killavullen	3	2	0	1	+15	4	Advance to Knockout Stage
3	Fermoy	3	1	1	1	+1	3	
4	Araglen	3	0	0	3	-41	0	

Fermoy 3-21 - 3-09 Araglen

Ballygiblin 2-14 - 1-13 Killavullen

Ballygiblin 0-16 - 2-10 Fermoy

Killavullen 1-19 - 1-11 Araglen

Killavullen 1-17 - 0-09 Fermoy

Araglen 0-09 - 3-21 Ballygiblin

Group C

Pos	Team	Pld	W	D	L	Diff	Pts	Qualification
1	Ballyhooly	3	2	1	0	+47	5	Advance to Knockout Stage
2	Clyda Rovers	3	2	1	0	+36	5	Advance to Knockout Stage
3	Buttevant	3	1	0	2	-19	2	
4	Ballyclough	3	0	0	3	-64	0	

Buttevant 2-16 - 0-14 Ballyclough

Clyda Rovers 1-17 - 1-17 Ballyhooly

Clyda Rovers 0-23 - 1-11 Buttevant

Ballyhooly 4-31 - 1-11 Ballyclough

Ballyhooly 3-23 - 1-11 Buttevant

Ballyclough 0-10 - 4-25 Clyda Rovers

Group D

Pos	Team	Pld	W	D	L	Diff	Pts	Qualification
1	Harbour Rovers	2	1	1	0	+16	3	Advance to Knockout Stage
2	Charleville	2	1	1	0	+4	3	Advance to Knockout Stage
3	Castletownroche	2	0	0	2	-20	0	

Charleville 1-17 - 0-20 Harbour Rovers

Harbour Rovers 1-22 - 0-09 Castletownroche

Castletownroche 2-16 - 1-23 Charleville

Knockout Stage

Quarter-Finals
Clyda Rovers	2-07
Harbour Rovers	0-12
Dromina	1-13
Killavullen	0-15
Kilshannig	0-12
Ballygiblin	0-15 AET
Ballyhooly	1-14
Charleville	2-12

Semi-Finals
Clyda Rovers	2-16
Dromina	1-13
Ballygiblin	1-14
Charleville	0-15

Final
Clyda Rovers	0-10
Ballygiblin	2-12

== Results ==
=== Bracket ===
Quarter-Finals
Passage (Seandun)	1-15
Ballinascarthy (Carbery)	0-16
Ballymartle (Carrigdhoun)	1-06
St Ita's (Imokilly)	2-16
Ballinora (Muskerry)	0-08
Dromtarriffe (Duhallow)	1-19

Semi-Finals
Ballygiblin (Avondhu)	1-16
Passage (Seandun)	2-11
St Ita's (Imokilly)	0-11
Dromtarriffe (Duhallow)	1-18

Final
Ballygiblin (Avondhu)	2-18
Dromtarriffe (Duhallow)	0-18

=== Quarter-finals ===
6 November 2021 Quarter-final	Passage	1-15 - 0-16	Ballinascarthy	Brinny Sportsfield
	C McCarthy 0-8 (0-4 f, 0-1 sl), T O’Neill 1-2, N McCarthy 0-2, S Harrington, G Carroll, C Coughlan 0-1 each.	Report	J Ryan 0-6 (0-4 f), C Cullinane 0-3, B O’Donovan, R O’Flynn 0-2 each, C Ryan, L Murray, C O’Neill 0-1 each.

6 November 2021 Quarter-final	Ballymartle	1-06 - 2-16	St Ita's	Éire Óg GAA Grounds
	D O'Leary 0-4, P Geary 1-0, F Desmond 0-1, G Murphy 0-1.		S Harnedy 1-9, F Foley 1-0, D O'Rourke 0-2, P O'Brien 0-1, E Coleman 0-1, C O'Brien 0-1, E Loughlin 0-1, G Coleman 0-1.

6 November 2021 Quarter-final	Ballinora	0-08 - 1-19	Dromtarriffe	Coachford Sportsfield
	L Lyons 0-4f, S Kingston (’65), K Murphy, C Quirke, A O’Shea 0-1 each.	Report	T Howard 1-4, S Howard 0-4 (0-2f), D O’Keeffe 0-3, B Murphy 0-3, K Cremin 0-2, J Murphy, J O’Sullivan, S Coyne 0-1 each.

=== Semi-finals ===
13 November 2021 Semi-final	Ballygiblin	1-16 - 2-11	Passage	Glenville GAA Grounds
	D Flynn 0-8 (0-7 f), A Donegan 1-0, J O'Sullivan, M Walsh 0-3 each, D Barry, S O'Sullivan 0-1 each.	Report	C McCarthy 1-4 (1-3 f,.0-1 65), N McCarthy 1-1, A Kidney, S Harrington, R Carroll, C Coughlan, J Byrnes, R Harrington (f) 0-1 each.	Referee: B McSweeney (Erin's Own)

13 November 2021 Semi-final	St Ita's	0-11 - 1-18	Dromtarriffe	Mallow GAA Complex
	S Harnedy 0-9 (6f, 1 '65’), D O'Brien 0-2.	Report	S Howard 0-7 (5f, 1 ‘65’), T Howard 1-2, B Murphy 0-3, S Coyne 0-2, D O'Keeffe 0-2; J O'Sullivan 0-2,	Referee: A Hyland (Kilworth)

=== Final ===
20 November 2021 Final	Ballygiblin (Avondhu)	2-18 - 0-18	Dromtarriffe (Duhallow)	Páirc Uí Rinn
	D Flynn 0-10 (0-8 f, 0-1 sideline), M Keane, S O’Sullivan 1-0 each, M Walsh, D Barry 0-3 each, K Duggan, C O’Sullivan 0-1 each.	Report	S Howard 0-9 (0-6 f), S Coyne 0-4, J O’Sullivan 0-2, T Howard, B Murphy, E Murphy 0-1 each.	Referee: N O'Neill (Midleton)

== Championship statistics ==
=== Top scorers ===
Rank	Player	Club	Tally	Total	Matches	Average
1	Séamus Harnedy	St Ita's	1-18	21	2	10.50
2	Seán Howard	Dromtarriffe	0-20	20	3	6.66
3	Darragh Flynn	Ballygiblin	0-18	18	2	9.00
4	Cian McCarthy	Passage	1-12	15	2	7.50
5	Tomás Howard	Dromtarriffe	2-07	13	3	4.33
6	Brandon Murphy	Dromtarriffe	0-07	7	3	2.33
6	Stephen Coyne	Dromtarriffe	0-07	7	3	2.33
8	Niall McCarthy	Passage	1-03	6	2	3.00
8	Jeremy Ryan	Ballinascarthy	0-06	6	1	6.00
8	Michael Walsh	Ballygiblin	0-06	6	2	3.00
