= Cork Junior B Hurling Championship =

- Irish: Craobh Iomána Shóisearach B Chorcaí
- Code: Hurling
- Founded: 1984; 42 years ago
- Region: Cork (GAA)
- Trophy: No name
- No. of teams: 16
- Title holders: Araglen (3rd title)
- Most titles: Araglen (3 titles)
- Sponsors: Co-Op Superstores
- Official website: Cork GAA

The Cork Junior B Hurling Championship (known for sponsorship reasons as the Co-Op Superstores Cork Junior B Hurling Championship and abbreviated to the Cork JBHC) is an annual hurling competition organised by the Cork County Board of the Gaelic Athletic Association and contested by the second tier junior clubs in the county of Cork in Ireland. It is the seventh tier overall in the entire Cork hurling championship system.

The Cork Junior B Championship was introduced in 1984 as a countywide competition for "weaker" junior teams. At the time of its creation it was the fourth tier of Cork hurling.

The Cork Junior B Championship is unlike all other championships in Cork in that it doesn't include a group stage. In its current format, the teams compete in a double-elimination tournament which culminates with a final. The winner of the Cork Junior B Championship qualifies for the subsequent Munster Club Championship.

The competition has been won by 32 teams, 11 of which have won it more than once. Araglen are the most successful teams in the tournament's history, having won it 3 times.

Araglen are the title holders, defeating Castlemagner 3–14 to 1–08 in the 2026 final.

In 2015, a second Junior B Championship (known as Inter-Divisional Championship) was introduced to run parallel with the traditional Junior B Championship. Mirroring the Junior A Hurling Championship, this competition allows all the Junior B divisional champions an opportunity to win a county. Unlike the traditional Championship, second string teams can enter the divisional championships and potentially win the county championship.

== Format ==
=== Group stage ===
The 16 teams are divided into four group of four. Over the course of the group stage, each team plays once against the others in the group. Two points are awarded for a win, one for a draw and zero for a loss. The teams are ranked in the group stage table by points gained, then scoring difference and then their head-to-head record. The top two teams in each group qualify for the knockout stage.

=== Knockout stage ===
Quarter-finals: The eight qualifying teams from the group stage contest this round. The four winners from these four games advance to the semi-finals.

Semi-finals: The four quarter-final winners contest this round. The two winners from these four games advance to the semi-finals.

Final: The two semi-final winners contest the final. The winning team are declared champions.

== Teams ==
=== 2026 teams ===
Team	Location	Division	Colours	In Championship since	Championship titles	Last championship title
Araglen	Araglin	Avondhu	Green and white	2026	3	2026
Ballinacurra	Ballinacurra	Imokilly	Green and white	2026	1	2009
Ballyphehane	Ballyphehane	Seandún	Blue and white	2025	0	—
Bantry Blues	Bantry	Carbery	Blue and white	2025	0	—
Brian Dillons	Montenotte	Seandún	Blue and white	2025	0	—
Castlemagner	Castlemagner	Duhallow	Black and amber	2026	1	2012
Castletownroche	Castletownroche	Avondhu	Green and gold	2023	2	2019
Crosshaven	Crosshaven	Carrigdhoun	Black and red	2024	0	—
Delaney Rovers	Dublin Hill	Seandún	Green, white and gold	2026	0	—
Doneraile	Doneraile	Avondhu	Red and green	2026	1	2010
Gabriel Rangers	Ballydehob, Schull	Carbery	Green and white	?	1	1989
Laochra Óg	Macroom	Muskerry	Blue and white	2025	0	—
Lough Rovers	Carrigrohane Rd.	Seandún	Red and white	?	0	—
O'Donovan Rossa	Skibbereen	Carbery	Red and white	?	2	2013
Oliver Plunketts	Ahiohill	Carbery	Black and white	2026	2	2023
Rathpeacon	Rathpeacon	Seandún	Blue and white	2024	0	—

== List of finals ==
Year	Winners		Runners-up	
Year	Club	Score	Club	Score
2026	Araglen	3-14	Castlemagner	1-08
2025	Ballyclough	3-09	Iveleary	1-14
2024	Buttevant	2-16	Iveleary	1-10
2023	St. Oliver Plunketts	2-20	Ballyclough	0-13
2022	Freemount	1-18	Randal Óg	1-17
2021	Belgooly	3-16	Randal Óg	1-15
2020	Araglen	2-12	Freemount	0-17
2019	Castletownroche	3-22	Lough Rovers	2-17
2018	White's Cross	0-12	O'Donovan Rossa	0-11
2017	Killavullen	2-14	Whites Cross	1-08
2016	Whitechurch	2-20	Killavullen	1-08
2015	Shanballymore	1-15	Bantry Blues	1-13
2014	Ballyclough	1–10, 1-19 (R)	Dromtarriffe	1–10, 3-02 (R)
2013	O'Donovan Rossa	2-11	Ballyclough	0-12
2012	Castlemagner	0-14	Rathpeacon	1-07
2011	Kilmichael	1-18	Ballinacurra	0-08
2010	Doneraile	2-08	Rathpeacon	1-09
2009	Ballinacurra	4-12	Randal Óg	1-20
2008	Lisgoold	2-19	St Mary's	1-07
2007	St. Ita's	0–11, 0-12 (R)	Castlemagner	0–11, 0-07 (R)
2006	Dohenys	0-09	Killavullen	0-06
2005	St. James	2-06	Lough Rovers	0-07
2004	O'Donovan Rossa	3-17	Lismire	1-07
2003	St. Colum's	3-11	Lisgoold	1-12
2002	St. Oliver Plunketts	0-11	Kilshannig	0-10
2001	Harbour Rovers	3-08	St Mary's	2-04
2000	Randal Óg	0-10	Lisgoold	0-06
1999	Araglen	1-11	St. Oliver Plunketts	0-10
1998	Castletownroche	2-12	Tullylease	0-05
1997	Carrignavar	1-10	Kilshannig	0-07
1996	Buttevant	1-11	Dohenys	0-05
1995	Ballyhooly	2-14	Tullylease	0-07
1994	Lisgoold	3-06	Buttevant	1-11
1993	Ballygiblin	4-12	Belgooly	1-12
1992	Randal Óg	3-16	Tullylease	2-03
1991	Castlelyons	2-07	Whites Cross	1-04
1990	Harbour Rovers	0-12	Rathpeacon	0-08
1989	Gabriel Rangers	3-07	Buttevant	0-11
1988	Kilshannig	0-10	Whitechurch	0-01
1987	Liscarroll	2-08	Randal Óg	1-07
1986	Iveleary	0-07	St Mary's	1-01
1985	Ballyhooley	4-08	Dromtarriffe	0-01
1984	Kilbree	4-03	Kilshannig	3-05

== Roll of honour ==
=== By club ===
#	Club	Titles	Runners-up	Winning years	Losing years
1	Araglen	3	0	1999, 2020, 2026	—
2	Randal Óg	2	4	1992, 2000	1987, 2009, 2021, 2022
2	Lisgoold	2	2	1994, 2008	2000, 2003
2	Buttevant	2	2	1996, 2024	1989, 1994
2	Ballyclough	2	2	2014, 2025	2013, 2023
2	O'Donovan Rossa	2	1	2004, 2013	2018
2	St. Oliver Plunketts	2	1	2002, 2023	1999
2	Ballyhooly	2	0	1985, 1995	—
2	Harbour Rovers	2	0	1990, 2001	—
2	Castletownroche	2	0	1998, 2019	—
11	Kilshannig	1	3	1988	1984, 1997, 2002
11	Killavullen	1	2	2017	2006, 2016
11	White's Cross	1	2	2018	1991, 2017
11	Castlemagner	1	2	2012	2007, 2026
11	Iveleary	1	2	1986	2024, 2025
11	Dohenys	1	1	2006	1996
11	Ballinacurra	1	1	2009	2011
11	Whitechurch	1	1	2016	1988
11	Belgooly	1	1	2021	1993
11	Freemount	1	1	2022	2020
11	Kilbree	1	0	1984	—
11	Liscarroll	1	0	1987	—
11	Gabriel Rangers	1	0	1989	—
11	Castlelyons	1	0	1991	—
11	Ballygiblin	1	0	1993	—
11	Carrignavar	1	0	1997	—
11	St. Colum's	1	0	2003	—
11	St. James	1	0	2005	—
11	St. Ita's	1	0	2007	—
11	Doneraile	1	0	2010	—
11	Kilmichael	1	0	2011	—
11	Shanballymore	1	0	2015	—
33	Tullylease	0	3	—	1992, 1995, 1998
33	St Mary’s	0	3	—	1986, 2001, 2008
33	Rathpeacon	0	3	—	1990, 2010, 2012
33	Dromtarriffe	0	2	—	1985, 2014
33	Lough Rovers	0	2	—	2005, 2019
33	Lismire	0	1	—	2004
33	Bantry Blues	0	1	—	2015

=== By division ===
Club	Titles	Runners-up	Total	Most recent success
Avondhu	19	9	28	2026
Carbery	11	11	22	2023
Imokilly	6	3	9	2009
Duhallow	2	9	11	2022
Seandún	2	8	10	2018
Muskerry	2	2	4	2011
Carrigdhoun	1	1	2	2021

== Junior B Inter-Divisional Hurling Championship ==
=== List of finals ===
Year	Winners		Runners-up	
Year	Club	Score	Club	Score
2026	Championship in progress.			
2025	Dungourney	4-13	Newtownshandrum	1-16
2024	Fr O'Neill's	1–14	Aghabullogue	0–14
2023	Fermoy	4–11	Killeagh	1–09
2022	Ballyhea	5–10	St Finbarr's	4–08
2021	Belgooly	1–20	Newtownshandrum	1–16
2020	Midleton	2–10	Ballyhea	1–12
2019	Aghabullogue	1–10	Ballyhea	0–09
2018	Watergrasshill	0–13, 2–16	Mallow	0–13, 3–11
2017	Sarsfields	0–12, 1–19	Killavullen	2–06, 1–09
2016	Dromtarriffe	1–12, 0–14	Sarsfields	1–12, 0–11
2015	St Finbarr's	1–10	Dromtarriffe	1–09

=== Roll of honour ===
==== By club ====
#	Team	Titles	Runners-up	Championships won	Championships runner-up
1	Ballyhea	1	2	2022	2019, 2020
1	St Finbarr's	1	1	2015	2022
1	Dromtarriffe	1	1	2016	2015
1	Sarsfields	1	1	2017	2016
1	Aghabullogue	1	1	2019	2024
1	Watergrasshill	1	0	2018	—
1	Midleton	1	0	2020	—
1	Belgooly	1	0	2021	—
1	Fr O'Neill's	1	0	2024	—
1	Dungourney	1	0	2025	—
11	Newtownshandrum	0	2	—	2021, 2025
11	Killavullen	0	1	—	2017
11	Mallow	0	1	—	2018

==== By division ====
Club	Titles	Runners-up	Total	Most recent success
Imokilly	5	2	7	2025
Avondhu	2	6	8	2023
Seandún	1	1	2	2015
Duhallow	1	1	2	2016
Muskerry	1	1	2	2019
Carrigdhoun	1	0	1	2021
Carbery	0	0	0	—

=== 2026 teams ===
Bold indicates 2026 divisional champions / county representatives.

Division	Clubs
Duhallow	**Castlemagner**, Dromtarriffe, Kanturk, Meelin, Millstreet, Newmarket
Avondhu	Araglen, Ballygiblin, Ballyhea, Castletownroche, Doneraile, Kildorrery, Kilworth, LC Gaels, Mallow, **Newstownshandrum**
Muskerry	Ballincollig, Ballinora, Blarney, **Cloughduv**, Donoughmore, Éire Óg, Gleann na Laoi, Grenagh, Inniscarra, Laochra Óg
Carbery	Ballinascarthy, Bantry Blues, Barryroe, Gabriel Rangers, Kilbree, O’Donovan Rossa, **St Oliver Plunketts**
Seandún	Ballyphehane, Bishopstown, Blackrock, Brian Dillons, Delaney Rovers, Douglas, Glen Rovers, Lough Rovers, Mayfield, Na Piarsaigh, Nemo Rangers, Passage West, Rathpeacon, **St Finbarr’s**, St Vincent’s, Whitechurch
Carrigdhoun	Ballinhassig, Ballygarvan, Ballymartle, Courcey Rovers, Crosshaven, Kinsale, **Tracton**, Valley Rovers
Imokilly	Aghada, Bride Rovers, Castlelyons, Castlemartyr, Cloyne, Erin’s Own, Killeagh, Lisgoold, Midleton, St Catherine’s, **Youghal**

== See also ==
- Cork Premier Senior Hurling Championship (Tier 1)
- Cork Senior A Hurling Championship (Tier 2)
- Cork Premier Intermediate Hurling Championship (Tier 3)
- Cork Intermediate A Hurling Championship (Tier 4)
- Cork Premier Junior Hurling Championship (Tier 5)
- Cork Junior A Hurling Championship (Tier 6)
