= 1932 Cork Junior Hurling Championship =

Irish hurling competition

- Dates: 2 October – 13 November 1932
- Teams: 6
- Champions: Lough Rovers (1st title)
- Runners-up: Skibberreen; J. McCarthy (captain)

Tournament statistics
- Matches played: 6
- Goals scored: 38 (6.33 per match)
- Points scored: 29 (4.83 per match)

The 1932 Cork Junior Hurling Championship was the 36th staging of the Cork Junior Hurling Championship since its establishment by the Cork County Board in 1895. The championship ran from 2 October to 13 November 1932.

The final was played on 13 November 1932 at the Town Park Grounds in Clonakilty, between Lough Rovers and Skibberreen, in what was their first and only meeting in the final. Lough Rovers won the match by 5-04 to 4-01 to claim their first ever championship title.

== Qualification ==
Division	Championship	Champions	#
Avondhu	North Cork Junior Hurling Championship	Liscarroll	
Carbery	South West Junior Hurling Championship	Skibberreen	
Carrigdhoun	South East Junior Hurling Championship	Rochestown	
Imokilly	East Cork Junior Hurling Championship	Bride Rovers	
Muskerry	Mid Cork Junior Hurling Championship	Ballincollig	
Seandún	Cork City Junior Hurling Championship	Lough Rovers	

== Results ==
=== Quarter-finals ===
16 October 1932 Quarter-final	Lough Rovers	10-05 - 0-03	Ballincollig	Cloughduv Athletic Grounds

16 October 1932 Quarter-final	Liscarroll	1-02 - 0-00	Bride Rovers	Mallow Town Park Grounds

=== Semi-finals ===
2 October 1932 Semi-final	Skibberreen	6-03 - 1-07	Rochestown	Bandon Athletic Grounds

30 October 1932 Semi-final	Lough Rovers	7-03 - 4-01	Liscarroll	Buttevant Athletic Grounds

=== Final ===
13 November 1932 Final	Lough Rovers	5-04 - 4-01	Skibberreen	Clonakilty Town Park Grounds
