= 2000 Cork Junior A Football Championship =

- Dates: 15 October – 3 December 2000
- Teams: 8
- Champions: Killavullen (1st title); Edmond O'Connor (captain); John Beechinor (manager)
- Runners-up: Kiskeam

Tournament statistics
- Matches played: 9
- Goals scored: 15 (1.67 per match)
- Points scored: 162 (18 per match)

The 2000 Cork Junior A Football Championship was the 102nd staging of the Cork Junior A Football Championship since its establishment by Cork County Board in 1895. The championship ran from 15 October to 3 December 2000.

The final was played on 3 December 2000 at the Dr Mannix Sportsfield in Charleville, between Killavullen and Kiskeam, in what was their first ever meeting in the final. Killavullen won the match by 1–12 to 2–05 to claim their first ever championship title.

== Qualification ==
Division	Championship	Champions
Avondhu	North Cork Junior A Football Championship	Killavullen
Beara	Beara Junior A Football Championship	Adrigole
Carbery	South West Junior A Football Championship	Ilen Rovers
Carrigdhoun	South East Junior A Football Championship	Courcey Rovers
Duhallow	Duhallow Junior A Football Championship	Kiskeam
Imokilly	East Cork Junior A Football Championship	Carrigtwohill
Muskerry	Mid Cork Junior A Football Championship	Grenagh
Seandún	City Junior A Football Championship	Mayfield

== Results ==
=== Quarter-finals ===
15 October 2000 Quarter-final	Mayfield	1–09 – 0–12	Adrigole	Páirc Tadhg na Samhna

22 October 2000 Quarter-final	Killavullen	0–12 – 0–07	Carrigtwohill	Páirc Mac Gearailt

22 October 2000 Quarter-final	Kiskeam	0–12 – 3–03	Courcey Rovers	Carrigadrohid Grounds

11 November 2000 Quarter-final replay	Mayfield	2–07 – 0–10	Adrigole	Páirc Tadhg na Samhna

11 November 2000 Quarter-final replay	Kiskeam	2–09 – 1–09	Courcey Rovers	Carrigadrohid Grounds

11 November 2000 Quarter-final	Ilen Rovers	0–11 – 0–07	Grenagh	St Mary's Park

=== Semi-finals ===
19 November 2000 Semi-final	Killavullen	0–11 – 0–09	Ilen Rovers	Cloughduv

19 November 2000 Semi-final	Kiskeam	2–08 – 1–09	Mayfield	Ballyclough Grounds

=== Final ===
3 December 2000 Final	Killavullen	1–12 – 2–05	Kiskeam	Dr Mannix Sportsfield
