= Cork Junior C Football Championship =

Annual Irish Gaelic football competition

- Irish: Craobh Peile Shóisearach C Chorcaí
- Code: Gaelic football
- Founded: 2016; 10 years ago
- Region: Cork (GAA)
- No. of teams: 9
- Title holders: Castlelyons (1st title)
- Most titles: Lough Rovers (2 titles)
- Sponsors: Bon Secours
- Official website: Cork GAA

The Cork Junior C Football Championship (known for sponsorship reasons as the Bon Secours Cork Junior C Football Championship and abbreviated to the Cork JCFC) is an annual Gaelic football competition organised by the Cork County Board of the Gaelic Athletic Association and contested by junior clubs in the county of Cork in Ireland. It is the eight tier overall in the entire Cork football championship system.

The Cork Junior C Championship was introduced in 2016. In its current format, the championship is completed over the course of ten weeks. Unlike the Cork Junior A Football Championship, it is a countywide competition not limited to divisional champions. The championship includes a round robin followed by a knockout stage, which culminates with the final match at Páirc Uí Rinn.

The competition has been won by 9 teams, 1 of which have won it more than once. Lough Rovers are the most successful team in the competition's history, having won it 2 times. Castlelyons are the title holders, defeating Rochestown by 3–09 to 1–10 in the 2025 final.

== Format ==
=== Group stage ===
The 10 teams are divided into one group of four and two groups of three. Over the course of the group stage, each team plays once against the others in the group. Two points are awarded for a win, one for a draw and zero for a loss. The teams are ranked in the group stage table by points gained, then scoring difference and then their head-to-head record. The top two teams in each group qualify for the knockout stage.

=== Knockout stage ===
Quarter-finals: The eight qualifying teams from the group stage contest this round. The four winners from these four games advance to the semi-finals.

Semi-finals: The four quarter-final winners contest this round. The two winners from these four games advance to the semi-finals.

Final: The two semi-final winners contest the final. The winning team are declared champions.

== Teams ==
=== 2025 teams ===
Team	Location	Division	Colours	Position in 2025	In championship since	Championship titles	Last championship title
Abbey Rovers	Castletownroche	Avondhu	Green and gold	Group stage	2023	1	2018
Castlelyons	Castlelyons	Imokilly	Green and gold	Champions	2025	1	2025
Freemount	Freemount	Duhallow	Maroon and white	Group stage	2017	0	—
Gleann Na Laoi	Kerry Pike	Muskerry	Yellow and blue	Group stage	2016	0	—
Grange	Grange	Avondhu	Yellow and white	Quarter-finals	2023	0	—
Lough Rovers	Carrigrohane	Seandún	Red and white	Semi-finals	2023	2	2020
Rathpeacon	Rathpeacon	Seandún	Blue and white	Semi-finals	2019	0	—
Rochestown	Rochestown	Seandún	Black and amber	Runners-up	2022	0	—
St John's	Kilcorney	Duhallow	Red and amber	Quarter-finals	2021	1	2019

== List of finals ==
=== List of Cork JCFC finals ===
Year	Winners		Runners-up		#
Year	Club	Score	Club	Score	#
2026	Grange	2-14	Abbey Rovers	1-12	
2025	Castlelyons	3–09	Rochestown	1–10	
2024	Ballinacurra	3–11	Grange	1–12	
2023	Lismire	2–09	Ballinacurra	0–3	
2022	Ballyphehane	4–09	Freemount	0–06	
2021	Araglen	4–09	Lismire	0–09	
2020	Lough Rovers	2–13	Freemount	1-06	
2019	St John's	2–09	Ballyphehane	1–05	
2018	Abbey Rovers	0–13	Freemount	0–11	
2017	Lough Rovers	2–07	St John's	0–09	
2016	Goleen	1–13	Abbey Rovers	3–05	

== Roll of honour ==
=== By club ===
#	Team	Titles	Runners-up	Championships won	Championships runner-up
1	Lough Rovers	2	0	2017, 2020	—
2	Abbey Rovers	1	1	2018	2016
2	St John's	1	1	2019	2017
2	Ballyphehane	1	1	2022	2019
2	Lismire	1	1	2023	2021
2	Ballinacurra	1	1	2024	2023
2	Goleen	1	0	2016	—
2	Araglen	1	0	2021	—
2	Castlelyons	1	0	2025	—
10	Freemount	0	3	—	2018, 2020, 2022
10	Grange	1	1	2026	2024
10	Rochestown	0	1	—	2025

=== By Division ===
Division	Titles	Runners-Up	Total
Seandún	3	2	5
Duhallow	2	5	7
Avondhu	2	2	4
Imokilly	2	1	3
Carbery	1	0	1
Beara	0	0	0
Carrigdhoun	0	0	0
Muskerry	0	0	0

== See also ==
- Cork Premier Junior Football Championship
- Cork Junior A Football Championship
- Cork Junior B Football Championship
