= 1953 Cork Senior Hurling Championship =

Annual hurling competition season

- Dates: 12 April 1953 – 20 October 1953
- Teams: 17
- Champions: Glen Rovers (14th title); Josie Hartnett (captain)
- Runners-up: Sarsfields

Tournament statistics
- Matches played: 15
- Goals scored: 104 (6.93 per match)
- Points scored: 190 (12.67 per match)

The 1953 Cork Senior Hurling Championship was the 65th staging of the Cork Senior Hurling Championship since its establishment by the Cork County Board in 1887. The championship ended on 25 October 1953.

Avondhu were the defending champions.

On 25 October 1953, Glen Rovers won the championship following an 8–5 to 4–3 defeat of Sarsfields in the final. This was their 14th championship title overall and their first title in three championship seasons.

== Team changes ==
=== To Championship ===
Returned after a one-year absence

- Seandún

Promoted from the Cork Intermediate Hurling Championship

- Bandon
- Nemo Rangers

=== From Championship ===
Regraded to the Cork Intermediate Hurling Championship

- Rathluirc

Regraded to the Cork Junior Hurling Championship

- Ballincollig

== Results ==
=== First round ===
12 April 1953 First round	Nemo Rangers	2-04 - 6-07	Glen Rovers	Cork Athletic Grounds
	T O'Riordan 1-1, F Delea 1-0, T Murphy 0-2, J Coffey 0-1.		J Lynam 2-2, C Ring 2-1, J Clifford 1-3, J Quinlan 1-0, J Hartnett 0-1.

26 April 1953 First round	University College Cork	1-08 - 5-05	Midleton	Riverstown Sportsfield

3 May 1953 First round	Carrigdhoun	1-06 - 4-14	Carrigtwohill	Cork Athletic Grounds

17 May 1953 First round	Sarsfields	4-08 - 0-03	Carbery	Clonakilty Sportsfield

31 May 1953 First round	Muskerry	1-04 - 4-05	Seandún	Coachford Sportsfield

31 May 1953 First round	Avondhu	1-03 - 6-07	Blackrock	Cork Athletic Grounds

5 July 1953 First round	Imokilly	5-09 - 4-08	St. Finbarr's	Riverstown Sportsfield

5 July 1953 First round	Bandon	4-03 - 4-05	Shanballymore	Cork Athletic Grounds

- Duhallow received a bye in this round, however, they later withdrew from the championship.

=== Second round ===
23 August 1953 Second round	Glen Rovers	5-12 - 1-05	Imokilly	Cork Athletic Grounds
	J Hartnett 2-3, C Ring 1-5, J Lynam 1-1, J Clifford 1-1, J Twomey 0-1, O Ryan 0-1.		T O'Sullivan 1-0, J Lane 0-2, J O'Sullivan 0-1, J Coyne 0-1, L Dowling 0-1.

23 August 1953 Second round	Carrigtwohill	6-06 - 2-05	Shanballymore	Páirc Mac Gearailt

30 August 1953 Second round	Sarsfields	6-07 - 4-04	Seandún	Cork Athletic Grounds

20 September 1953 Second round	Midleton	4-05 - 3-05	Blackrock	Riverstown Sportsfield

- Blackrock were readmitted to the championship and Midleton, who they had unsuccessfully objected to at an earlier date, were ruled out of the championship.

=== Semi-finals ===
27 September 1953 Semi-final	Sarsfields	5-05 - 3-08	Carrigtwohill	Cork Athletic Grounds
				Referee: J O'Mahony (Passage)

11 October 1953 Semi-final	Glen Rovers	1-13 - 0-08	Blackrock	Cork Athletic Grounds
	C Ring 1-3, E Goulding 0-4, V Twomey 0-2, J Lynam 0-1, J Twomey 0-1, M Murphy 0-1, J Clifford 0-1.		D Murphy 0-3, A Maher 0-1, D O'Connell 0-1, EJ O'Sullivan 0-1, F O'Sullivan 0-1, J Bennett 0-1.	Referee: C Conway (Blarney)

=== Final ===
25 October 1953 Final	Glen Rovers	8-05 - 4-03	Sarsfields	Cork Athletic Grounds
	J Hartnett 2-0; C Ring 1-2; J Lynam 1-1; J Clifford 1-0; M Murphy 1-0; E Goulding 1-2; E Ryan 1-0.		M Brennan 1-1; J O'Neill 2-0; E Monahan 1-1; P Barry 0-1.	Attendance: 21,000
