= North Cork Junior A Hurling Championship =

Irish sporting competition

- Current season or competition: 2024 North Cork Junior A Hurling Championship
- Irish: Craobh Iomána Sóisear A Corcaigh Thuaidh
- Code: Hurling
- Founded: 1925; 101 years ago
- Region: Avondhu (GAA)
- Trophy: Seán O'Brien Memorial Cup
- No. of teams: 12
- Title holders: Dromina (6th title)
- Most titles: Ballyhea, Kilworth (10 titles)
- Sponsors: Hibernian Hotel
- Official website: Official website

The North Cork Junior A Hurling Championship (known for sponsorship reasons as the Hibernian Hotel Junior A Hurling Championship and abbreviated to the North Cork JAHC) is an annual club hurling competition organised by the North Cork Board of the Gaelic Athletic Association and contested by the top-ranking junior clubs in North Cork, Ireland, deciding the competition winners through a group stage and knockout format. It is the most prestigious competition in North Cork hurling.

Introduced in 1925 as the North Cork Junior Championship, it was initially a straight knockout tournament. The competition went through a number of format changes since then, including the introduction of a back-door or second chance for beaten teams.

In its current format, the North Cork Junior Championship begins with a group stage in late summer. The 12 participating teams are divided into three groups of four and play each other in a round-robin system. The two top-ranking teams in each group proceed to the knockout phase that culminates with the final. The winner of the North Cork Junior A Championship, as well as receiving the Seán O'Brien Memorial Cup, also qualifies for the subsequent Cork Junior A Hurling Championship.

The competition has been won by 21 teams, 17 of which have won it more than once. Ballyhea and Kilworth are the most successful teams in the tournament's history, having won it 10 times each. Dromina are the title-holders, after defeating Ballyhooly by 0–20 to 1–13 in the 2026 final.

== History ==
=== Development ===
The Cork Junior Hurling Championship had been contested on a countywide basis since 1895, however, an increase in the number of participating clubs resulted in a restructuring of the entire championship. The North Cork Board was established in 1925 with other divisions in other parts of the county created in the years that followed. Since then the individual junior championships were organised on a divisional basis with the division winners progressing to contest the county series of games. The first North Cork Junior Championship was played in 1925.

In 2007 the championship was split in two with the top teams competing in the newly named North Cork Premier Junior Hurling Championship. Following this change the North Cork Junior A Hurling Championship was contested by the second tier teams. This system lasted until 2014 when the premier championship reverted to being called the North Cork JAHC.

=== Team dominance ===
Milford were the first team to have multiple successes in the championship. They won four titles between 1925 and 1936, while also becoming the first club to retain the championship.

Near neighbours and local rivals Ballyhea and Newtownshandrum had a dominant period from 1939 until 1968. The two clubs shared 14 championship titles during this period. Castletownroche also had their greatest period during this time, winning four titles between 1954 and 1960.

Since the 1960s, the championship was dominated by Kildorrery and Kilworth, who regularly won titles in each of the following decades. Kilworth claimed all of their 11 championships in a 45-year period between 1961 and 2006 to leave them in joint first position on the all-time roll of honour. This period of success was closely challenged by Kildorrery who won eight of their nine championship titles between 1962 and 1988. At this time Fermoy emerged as a force, winning five championships between 1987 and 1999.

The first decade of the 21st century was dominated by Charleville. After a 15-year hiatus they claimed their fifth ever title in 2001. Four more championships followed between 2002 and 2011.

=== Format history ===
For the first seventy years the championship was played as a single elimination tournament whereby once a team lost they were eliminated from the championship. Since the late 1990s the championship has seen the introduction of a "back door" system which provides each team with a minimum of two games before exiting the championship.

== Format ==
=== Group stage ===
The 12 teams are divided into three groups of four. Over the course of the group stage, each team plays once against the others in the group, resulting in each team being guaranteed at least three games. Two points are awarded for a win, one for a draw and zero for a loss. The teams are ranked in the group stage table by points gained, then scoring difference and then their head-to-head record. The top two teams in each group qualify for the knockout stage.

=== Knockout stage ===
Quarter-finals: Two lone quarter-finals featuring the four lowest-placed qualifying teams from the group stage. Two teams qualify for the next round.

Semi-finals: The two quarter-final winners and the top two highest-placed qualifying teams from the group stage contest this round. The two winners from these games advance to the final.

Final: The two semi-final winners contest the final. The winning team are declared champions.

== Teams ==
=== 2027 Teams ===
The 14 teams expected to compete in the 2027 North Cork Junior A Hurling Championship are:

Team	Location	Colours	Position in 2026	In Championship since	Championship Titles	Last Championship Title
Araglen	Araglin	Green and white	Promoted from North Cork JBHC	2027	0	—
Ballyclough	Ballyclough	Green and yellow	Group stage	2026	0	—
Buttevant	Buttevant	Black and amber	Group stage	2025	1	2010
Ballyhooly	Ballyhooly	Blue and yellow	Runners-up	1996	0	—
Charleville	Charleville	Red and white	Semi-finals	2019	9	2011
Clyda Rovers	Mourneabbey	Black and yellow	Semi-finals	1992	3	2019
Dromina	Dromina	Blue and yellow	Champions	2014	6	2026
Fermoy	Fermoy	Black and amber	Group stage	2024	8	2009
Harbour Rovers	Glanworth	Green and white	Quarter-finals	2002	4	2023
Killavullen	Killavullen	Blue and white	Group stage	2018	1	2024
Liscarroll Churchtown Gaels	Churchtown	Green, white and yellow	Quarter-finals	2017	0	—
Milford	Milford	Blue and white	Relegated from Cork PJHC	2027	5	1981
Newtownshandrum	Newtownshandrum	Green and yellow	Promoted from North Cork JBHC	2027	9	2013
Shanballymore	Shanballymore	Red and black	Group stage	2016	5	1997

== Qualification for subsequent competitions ==
The North Cork Championship winners qualify for the subsequent Cork Junior A Hurling Championship.

== Roll of honour ==
=== By club ===
#	Club	Titles	Runners-up	Championship wins	Championship runner-up
1	Ballyhea	10	9	1930, 1949, 1950, 1953, 1955, 1958, 1959, 1965, 1975, 1976	1928, 1937, 1943, 1947, 1948, 1954, 1964, 1969, 1974
1	Kilworth	10	9	1961, 1966, 1967, 1971, 1980, 1983, 1993, 1995, 2005, 2006	1962, 1963, 1965, 1972, 1976, 1985, 1994, 1997, 2004
3	Charleville	9	8	1945, 1970, 1974, 1986, 2001, 2002, 2007, 2008, 2011	1926, 1973, 1977, 1983, 1984, 1995, 1998, 2006
3	Kildorrery	9	5	1962, 1963, 1969, 1972, 1973, 1977, 1984, 1988, 2012	1961, 1968, 1975, 1978, 2011
3	Newtownshandrum	9	3	1939, 1940, 1944, 1946, 1951, 1952, 1968, 1992, 2013	1941, 1942, 2014
6	Castletownroche	8	8	1928, 1954, 1956, 1957, 1960, 1978, 1979, 1982	1950, 1952, 1953, 1955, 1959, 1980, 1991, 2007
6	Fermoy	8	2	1941, 1964, 1987, 1990, 1991, 1994, 1999, 2009	2000, 2008
8	Dromina	6	11	1998, 2000, 2003, 2014, 2017, 2026	1927, 1981, 1987, 1988, 1992, 1993, 1996, 1999, 2001, 2002, 2025
9	Shanballymore	5	5	1931, 1937, 1942, 1996, 1997	1930, 1939, 1940, 1989, 2018
9	Milford	5	2	1925, 1933, 1935, 1936, 1981	1979, 1990
11	Harbour Rovers	4	3	2015, 2016, 2020, 2023	2012, 2019, 2024
12	Clyda Rovers	3	6	1985, 1989, 2019	1957, 1986, 2005, 2009, 2015, 2021
12	Ballygiblin	3	1	2004, 2018, 2021	2003
14	Doneraile	2	3	1947, 1948	1949, 1951, 1958
14	Oldcastletown	2	2	1938, 1943	1932, 1935
14	Kilshannig	2	2	2022, 2025	2020, 2023
14	Mallow	2	1	1926, 1927	1938
18	Liscarroll	1	5	1932	1931, 1934, 1970, 1971, 1982
18	Mitchelstown	1	3	1934	1933, 1936, 1944
18	Churchtown	1	1	1929	2010
18	Killavullen	1	1	2024	1929
18	Buttevant	1	0	2010	—
23	Ballyhooly	0	5	—	1945, 1946, 2016, 2017, 2026
23	Allow Rovers	0	2	—	1956, 1960
23	Liscarroll Churchtown Gaels	0	2	—	2013, 2022
23	Ballymagoogley	0	1	—	1925
23	Araglen	0	1	—	1966
23	Freemount	0	1	—	1967

== List of finals ==
Year	Winners		Runners-up		#
Year	Club	Score	Club	Score	#
2026	Dromina	0-20	Ballyhooly	1-13	
2025	Kilshannig	1-18	Dromina	2-13	
2024	Killavullen	2-19	Harbour Rovers	2-18	
2023	Harbour Rovers	1-16	Kilshannig	0-16	
2022	Kilshannig	1-14	Liscarroll/Churchtown Gaels	1-10	
2021	Ballygiblin	2-12	Clyda Rovers	0-10	
2020	Harbour Rovers	2-15	Kilshannig	0-14	
2019	Clyda Rovers	2-14	Harbour Rovers	0-19	
2018	Ballygiblin	1-15	Shanballymore	0-12	
2017	Dromina	3-07	Ballyhooly	1-12	
2016	Harbour Rovers	1-19	Ballyhooly	2-12	
2015	Harbour Rovers	1-13	Clyda Rovers	0-10	
2014	Dromina	1-18	Newtownshandrum	0-09	
2013	Newtownshandrum	2-16	Liscarroll/Churchtown Gaels	1-08	
2012	Kildorrery	3-17	Harbour Rovers	1-10	
2011	Charleville	2-12	Kildorrery	0-10	
2010	Buttevant	0-13	Churchtown	1-05	
2009	Fermoy	1-10	Clyda Rovers	0-12	
2008	Charleville	1-17	Fermoy	1-12	
2007	Charleville	1-19	Castletownroche	0-12	
2006	Kilworth	1-17	Charleville	0-12	
2005	Kilworth	4-17	Clyda Rovers	1-12	
2004	Ballygiblin	0-14	Kilworth	2-06	
2003	Dromina	1-15	Ballygiblin	0-14	
2002	Charleville	2-11	Dromina	0-10	
2001	Charleville	0-17	Dromina	2-08	
2000	Dromina	2-12	Fermoy	1-11	
1999	Fermoy	1-13	Dromina	0-12	
1998	Dromina	4-09	Charleville	1-15	
1997	Shanballymore	2-11	Kilworth	0-12	
1996	Shanballymore	4-06	Dromina	1-11	
1995	Kilworth	3-14	Charleville	1-09	
1994	Fermoy	2-08	Kilworth	0-06	
1993	Kilworth	2-11	Dromina	2-10	
1992	Newtownshandrum	2-08	Dromina	2-07	
1991	Fermoy	1-16	Castletownroche	1-07	
1990	Fermoy	3-08	Milford	1-09	
1989	Clyda Rovers	0-11	Shanballymore	0-10	
1988	Kildorrery	1-13	Dromina	1-05	
1987	Fermoy	2-08	Dromina	1-06	
1986	Charleville	0-12	Clyda Rovers	0-10	
1985	Clyda Rovers	1-09	Kilworth	1-06	
1984	Kildorrery	3-05	Charleville	1-10	
1983	Kilworth	4-09	Charleville	2-06	
1982	Castletownroche	4-15	Liscarroll	0-09	
1981	Milford	1-12	Dromina	1-06	
1980	Kilworth	4-08	Castletownroche	1-12	
1979	Castletownroche	2-17	Milford	3-04	
1978	Castletownroche	4-14	Kildorrery	3-08	
1977	Kildorrery	5-17	Charleville	2-09	
1976	Ballyhea	1-10	Kilworth	1-05	
1975	Ballyhea	1-13	Kildorrery	1-12	
1974	Charleville	2-04	Ballyhea	1-06	
1973	Kildorrery	4-18	Charleville	7-07	
1972	Kildorrery	3-11	Kilworth	2-09	
1971	Kilworth	4-10	Liscarroll	2-09	
1970	Charleville	4-11	Liscarroll	2-08	
1969	Kildorrery	3-10	Ballyhea	0-05	
1968	Newtownshandrum	2-11	Kildorrery	3-05	
1967	Kilworth	4-07	Freemount	3-03	
1966	Kilworth	4-09	Araglin	2-04	
1965	Ballyhea	2-11	Kilworth	3-03	
1964	Fermoy	6-02	Ballyhea	4-06	
1963	Kildorrery	4-05	Kilworth	3-07	
1962	Kildorrery	6-07	Kilworth	7-01	
1961	Kilworth	4-09	Kildorrery	2-07	
1960	Castletownroche	7-05	Allow Rovers	4-03	
1959	Ballyhea	4-06	Castletownroche	3-04	
1958	Ballyhea	3-07	Doneraile	4-03	
1957	Castletownroche	4-05	Clyda Rovers	2-04	
1956	Castletownroche	5-06	Allow Rovers	1-05	
1955	Ballyhea	6-05	Castletownroche	2-03	
1954	Castletownroche	1-11	Ballyhea	2-03	
1953	Ballyhea	6-05	Castletownroche	3-06	
1952	Newtownshandrum	4-08	Castletownroche	2-04	
1951	Newtownshandrum	5-09	Doneraile	4-03	
1950	Ballyhea	7-05	Castletownroche	0-01	
1949	Ballyhea	4-04	Doneraile	2-05	
1948	Doneraile	2-05	Ballyhea	0-03	
1947	Doneraile	5-10	Ballyhea	3-04	
1946	Newtownshandrum	6-03	Ballyhooly	2-02	
1945	Charleville	4-06	Ballyhooly	3-01	
1944	Newtownshandrum	4-07	Mitchelstown	4-01	
1943	Oldcastletown	6-07	Ballyhea	1-01	
1942	Shanballymore	5-03	Newtownshandrum	4-03	
1941	Fermoy	10-05	Newtownshandrum	2-04	
1940	Newtownshandrum	5-03	Shanballymore	3-03	
1939	Newtownshandrum	6-06	Shanballymore	3-04	
1938	Oldcastletown	3-06	Mallow	2-03	
1937	Shanballymore	2-06	Ballyhea	2-03	
1936	Milford	6-03	Mitchelstown	3-05	
1935	Milford	4-02	Oldcastletown	1-00	
1934	Mitchelstown	2-02	Liscarroll	2-01	
1933	Milford	4-02	Mitchelstown	3-04	
1932	Liscarroll	4-05	Oldcastletown	2-03	
1931	Shanballymore	4-01	Liscarroll	1-01	
1930	Ballyhea	2-05	Shanballymore	1-01	
1929	Churchtown	5-03	Killavullen	3-01	
1928	Castletownroche	3-03	Ballyhea	2-04	
1927 *	Dromina	4-00	Mallow	8-02	
1926	Mallow		Charleville		
1925	Milford		Ballymagooley		

Notes

- 1927 – Dromina's objection to the result was upheld.
- 1932 – the first match ended in a draw.
- 1963 – the first match ended in a draw: Kildorrery 4-05, Kilworth 4-05.
- 1964 – the first match ended in a draw: Fermoy 7-05, Ballyhea 6-08.
- 1978 – the first match ended in a draw: Castletownroche 3-12, Kildorrery 4-09.
- 1984 – the first match ended in a draw: Kildorrery 0-13, Charleville 2-07.
- 1985 – the first match ended in a draw: Clyda Rovers 0-11, Kilworth 2-05.
- 1992 – the first match ended in a draw: Newtownshandrum 3-04, Dromina 1-10.
- 2020 – the first match ended in a draw: Harbour Rovers 1-17, Kilshannig 1-17.

== Records and statistics ==
=== Teams ===
==== By decade ====
The most successful team of each decade, judged by the number of North Cork Junior A Hurling Championship titles, is as follows:

- 1930s: 3 for Milford (1933-35-36)
- 1940s: 3 for Newtownshandrum (1940-44-46)
- 1950s: 5 for Ballyhea (1950-53-55-58-59)
- 1960s: 3 each for Kildorrery (1962-63-69) and Kilworth (1961-66-67)
- 1970s: 3 for Kildorrery (1972-73-77)
- 1980s: 2 each for Kilworth (1980–83), Kildorrery (1984-88) and Clyda Rovers (1985–89)
- 1990s: 4 for Fermoy (1990-91-94-99)
- 2000s: 4 for Charleville (2001-02-07-08)
- 2010s: 2 each for Dromina (2014-17) and Harbour Rovers (2015-16)
- 2020s: 2 for Harbour Rovers (2020-23)

==== Gaps ====
Top ten longest gaps between successive championship titles:

- 71 years: Dromina (1927-1998)
- 54 years: Shanballymore (1942-1996)
- 45 years: Milford (1936-1981)
- 30 years: Clyda Rovers (1989-2019)
- 26 years: Castletownroche (1928-1954)
- 25 years: Charleville (1945-1970)
- 24 years: Newtownshandrum (1968-1992)
- 24 years: Kildorrery (1988-2012)
- 23 years: Fermoy (1941-1964)
- 23 years: Fermoy (1964-1987)

=== Winners and finalists ===
Two teams have won the North Cork Junior A Hurling Championship and the North Cork Junior A Football Championship in a single year as part of a hurling-Gaelic football double. Fermoy became the first club to win the double when they achieved the feat in 1941. Clyda Rovers became only the second team to complete the double in 1989.

Kildorrery, Mallow, Buttevant, Doneraile, Charleville, Kilshannig and Killavullen also hold the distinction of being dual North Cork Championship winning teams, however, these were not achieved in a single calendar year. Combined teams Glanworth-Harbour Rovers and Ballygiblin-Mitchelstown have also won North Cork titles in both codes.

=== County Record ===
#	Team	Titles	Runners-up	Years won	Years Runners-up
1	Ballyhea	3	1	1930, 1955, 1976	1959
2	Kilworth	2	4	1967, 2006	1961, 1980, 1993, 2005
2	Shanballymore	2	3	1908, 1942	1902, 1904, 1937
2	Newtownshandrum	2	2	1946, 1969	1940, 1992
2	Castletownroche	2	1	1960, 1982	1979
6	Charleville	1	3	2011	1974, 2001, 2007
6	Mallow	1	1	1914	1950
6	Doneraile	1	1	1919	1918
6	Kildorrery	1	1	2012	1972
6	Liscarroll	1	0	1934	—
6	Oldcastletown	1	0	1943	—
6	Milford	1	0	1981	—
6	Clyda Rovers	1	0	1989	—
6	Dromina	1	0	2003	—
6	Fermoy	1	0	2009	—
6	Ballygiblin	1	0	2021	—
17	Harbour Rovers	0	2	–	2020, 2023
17	Funcheon Vale	0	1	—	1916
17	Kilshannig	0	1	—	2022

== See also ==
- North Cork Junior A Football Championship
