= 1951 Cork Intermediate Hurling Championship =

Irish hurling competition

- Champions: Shanballymore (2nd title); Vincent Fahy (captain)
- Runners-up: Midleton

The 1951 Cork Intermediate Hurling Championship was the 42nd staging of the Cork Intermediate Hurling Championship since its establishment by the Cork County Board in 1909.

The final was played on 30 September 1951 at Fermoy Sportsfield, between Shanballymore abd Midleton, in what was their first ever meeting in the final. Shanballymore won the match by 2–06 to 1–04 to claim their second championship title overall and a first title in eight years.

== Results ==
=== Final ===
30 September 1951 Final	Shanballymore	2-06 - 1-04	Midleton	Fermoy Sportsfield
