= Cork Ladies' Senior Football Championship =

Annual ladies' gaelic football competition in Ireland

Cork Senior Ladies' Football Championship
- Irish: Craobh Peile na mBan Sinsear Corcaigh
- Code: Ladies' Gaelic Football
- Founded: 1976
- Region: Cork (GAA)
- Title holders: Éire Óg (1st title)
- Most titles: Donoughmore (13 titles)
- Official website: corkladiesfootball.com/

The Cork Ladies' Senior Football Championship is the senior Ladies' Gaelic Football competition featuring clubs affiliated to the Cork GAA.

Donoughmore are the competitions most successful club, having won 13 titles.

Éire Óg are the reigning champions, having defeated Aghada in the 2025 final replay.

== Roll of honour ==
#	Club	Titles	Years won
1	Donoughmore	13	1996, 1997, 1998, 1999, 2000, 2001, 2002, 2003, 2004, 2005, 2006, 2009, 2011
2	Mourneabbey	9	2014, 2015, 2016, 2017, 2018, 2019, 2021, 2022, 2023
3	Glanworth	7	1989, 1990, 1991, 1992, 1993, 1994, 1995
4	St Endas	6	1982, 1983, 1984, 1985, 1987, 1988
5	Inch Rovers	4	2012, 2010, 2008, 2007
6	Newtownshandrum	2	1978, 1979,
7	Éire Óg	1	2025
7	Aghada	1	2024
7	West Cork	1	2020
7	St Vals	1	2013
7	Ilen Rovers	1	1986
7	Watergrasshill	1	1981
7	Ballyclough	1	1977
7	Imokilly	1	1976

== Finals listed by year ==
Munster and All-Ireland winners
Munster winners and All-Ireland finalists
Munster winners

Year	Winner	Score	Runners up	Score	Notes
2026	Aghada		Naomh Aban		
2025	Éire Óg	1-12 (Replay); 0-10	Aghada	1-08 (Replay); 1-07	
2024	Aghada	1-06	Éire Óg	0-09	Aghada won 4-1 in a free-kick shootout
2023	Mourneabbey	2-12	Éire Óg	2-11	
2022	Mourneabbey	3-12	Éire Óg	0-13	
2021	Mourneabbey	1-11	Éire Óg	1-06	
2020	West Cork	4-09	Mourneabbey	2-13	
2019	Mourneabbey	4-09	West Cork	1-09	
2018	Mourneabbey	4-11 (Replay); 1-10	West Cork	1-10 (Replay); 1-10	
2017	Mourneabbey	5-07	St Vals	1-09	
2016	Mourneabbey	3-05	St Vals	2-07	
2015	Mourneabbey	Win (Replay); 1-11	St Vals	Loss (Replay); 1-11	
2014	Mourneabbey	0-13	St Vals	0-10	
2013	St Vals	0-11	Inch Rovers	1-07	
2012	Inch Rovers	0-14 Donoughmore	0-09		
2011	Donoughmore	0-16	Inch Rovers	2-09	
2010	Inch Rovers	0-15	Donoughmore	0-08	
2009	Donoughmore	2-14	Inch Rovers	0-06	
2008	Inch Rovers	2-10	Donoughmore	1-11	
2007	Inch Rovers	2-16	St Vals	0-06	
2006	Donoughmore	2-11	St Vals	2-04	
2005	Donoughmore	4-08	Rockchapel	0-10	
2004	Donoughmore				
2003	Donoughmore				
2002	Donoughmore				
2001	Donoughmore				
2000	Donoughmore				
1999	Donoughmore				
1998	Donoughmore				
1997	Donoughmore	7-14	Glanworth	1-07	
1996	Donoughmore	3-17	Rockchapel	4-02	
1995	Glanworth				
1994	Glanworth	3-09	Ilen Rovers	2-04	
1993	Glanworth				
1992	Glanworth				
1991	Glanworth				
1990	Glanworth	6-15	Ballingeary	1-00	
1989	Glanworth				
1988	St Enda's				
1987	St Enda's	2-04	Ilen Rovers	1-03	
1986	Ilen Rovers		St Luke's		
1985	St Enda's	4-06	Ilen Rovers	0-08	
1984	St Enda's				
1983	St Enda's				
1982	St Enda's				
1981	Watergrasshill				
1980	St End				
1979	Newtownshandrum				
1978	Newtownshandrum	2-5	Carbery	3-1	
1977	Ballyclough	1-03	Carbery	1-02	
1976	Imokilly	3-08	Ballyclough	3-02	
