= 1949 Cork Junior Football Championship =

Irish hurling competition

- Champions: St Patrick's (1st title)
- Runners-up: Glanworth

The 1949 Cork Junior Football Championship was the 51st staging of the Cork Junior Football Championship since its establishment by the Cork County Board in 1895.

The final was played on 6 November 1949 at the Athletic Grounds in Cork, between Collins and Canovee, in what was their first ever meeting in the final. St Patrick's won the match by 1–05 to 1–01 to claim their first ever championship title.

== Results ==
=== Final ===
6 November 1949 Final	St Patrick's	1–05 – 1–01	Glanworth	Cork Athletic Grounds
