= 1958 Cork Junior Hurling Championship =

Irish hurling competition

- Teams: 7
- Champions: Ballymartle (2nd title)
- Runners-up: Grenagh

The 1958 Cork Junior Hurling Championship was the 61st staging of the Cork Junior Hurling Championship since its establishment by the Cork County Board in 1895.

The final, a replay, was played on 7 December 1958 at the Athletic Grounds in Cork, between Ballymartle and Grenagh, in what was their first ever meeting in the final. Ballymartle won the match by 8-10 to 2-01 to claim a second championship title overall and a first championship title in six years.

== Results ==
=== Final ===
23 November 1958 Final	Ballymartle	1-07 - 2-04	Grenagh	Cork Athletic Grounds

=== Final replay ===
7 December 1958 Final replay	Ballymartle	8-10 - 2-01	Grenagh	Cork Athletic Grounds
