= 1919 Cork Junior Hurling Championship =

Irish hurling competition

- Champions: Doneraile (1st title)
- Runners-up: Fair Hill

The 1919 Cork Junior Hurling Championship was the 25th staging of the Cork Junior Hurling Championship since its establishment by the Cork County Board in 1895.

The final was played on 15 August 1920 at the Town Park Grounds in Mallow between Doneraile and Fair Hill, in what was their first ever meeting in the final. Doneraile won the match by 1-07 to 1-02 to claim their first ever championship title.

== Results ==
=== Final ===
15 August 1920 Final	Doneraile	1-07 - 1-02	Fair Hill	Mallow Town Park Grounds
