= 1944 Cork Intermediate Hurling Championship =

Irish hurling competition

- Champions: Lough Rovers (3rd title); M. Kenneally (captain)
- Runners-up: Oldcastletown

The 1944 Cork Intermediate Hurling Championship was the 35th staging of the Cork Intermediate Hurling Championship since its establishment by the Cork County Board in 1909.

The final was played on 22 October 1944 at the Athletic Grounds in Cork, between Lough Rovers and Oldcastletown, in what was their first ever meeting in the final. Lough Rovers won the match by 2–04 to 0–01 to claim their third championship title overall and a first title in two years.

== Results ==
=== Final ===
22 October 1944 Final	Lough Rovers	2-04 - 0-01	Oldcastletown	Cork Athletic Grounds
