= 1918 Cork Junior Hurling Championship =

Irish hurling competition

- Champions: Kinsale (1st title)
- Runners-up: Doneraile

The 1918 Cork Junior Hurling Championship was the 24th staging of the Cork Junior Hurling Championship since its establishment by the Cork County Board in 1895.

The final was played on 14 September 1918 at the Athletic Grounds in Cork between Kinsale and Doneraile, in what was their first ever meeting in the final. Kinsale won the match by 4-01 to 2-01 to claim their first ever championship title.

== Results ==
=== Final ===
14 September 1919 Final	Kinsale	4-01 - 2-01	Doneraile	Cork Athletic Grounds
