= St John's GAA =

St John's GAA may refer to:

- St John's GAA (Antrim), a sports club in Belfast
- St John's GAA (Cork), a sports club in Aubane, Kilcorney and Mushera, Ireland
- St John's GAA (Down) a sports club
- St John's GAA (Sligo), a sports club in Carraroe, Ireland

== See also ==
- Ballinteer St John's GAA, a sports club in Dún Laoghaire–Rathdown, Ireland
