= North Cork Junior A Football Championship =

- Code: Gaelic football
- Founded: 1926; 100 years ago
- Region: Avondhu (GAA)
- No. of teams: 9
- Title holders: Charleville (4th title)
- Most titles: Mitchelstown (24 titles)
- Sponsors: Synergy Fermoy Credit Union
- Official website: Official website

The North Cork Junior A Football Championship (known for sponsorship reasons as the Synergy Fermoy Credit Union Junior A Football Championship) is an annual Gaelic football competition organised by the Avondhu Board of the Gaelic Athletic Association since 1926 for junior Gaelic football teams in the northern part of Cork.

The series of games begin in April, with the championship culminating with the final in the autumn. The championship includes a group stage and knockout stage.

The North Cork Junior A Championship is an integral part of the wider Cork Junior A Football Championship. The winners and runners-up of the North Cork championship join their counterparts from the other seven divisions to contest the county championship.

11 clubs currently participate in the North Cork Championship. The title has been won at least once by 18 different clubs. The all-time record-holders are Mitchelstown, who have won a total of 24 titles.

Charleville are the title-holders, defeating Mallow by 3–05 to 0–08 in the 2026 final.

== Format ==
=== Group stage ===
The 10 teams are divided into two groups of three and one group of four. Over the course of the group stage, each team plays once against the others in the group, resulting in each team being guaranteed at least three games. Two points are awarded for a win, one for a draw and zero for a loss. The teams are ranked in the group stage table by points gained, then scoring difference and then their head-to-head record. The top two teams in each group qualify for the knockout stage.

=== Knockout stage ===
Quarter-finals: Two lone quarter-finals featuring the four lowest-placed qualifying teams from the group stage. Two teams qualify for the next round.

Semi-finals: The two quarter-final winners and the top two highest-placed qualifying teams from the group stage contest this round. The two winners from these games advance to the final.

Final: The two semi-final winners contest the final. The winning team are declared champions.

=== Promotion and relegation ===
At the end of the championship, the winning team enters the Cork Junior A Football Championship and by winning this, they will be promoted to the Cork Premier Junior Football Championship for the following season. There is no relegation to the North Cork Junior B Football Championship.

== Teams ==
=== 2026 teams ===
Team	Location	Colours	Position in 2026	In championship since	Championship Titles	Last Championship Title
Ballyclough	Ballyclough	Green and yellow	Quarter-finals	2012	5	2016
Ballyhooly	Ballyhooly	Blue and yellow	Group stage	2017	0	—
Charleville	Charleville	Red and white	Champions	2014	4	2026
Clyda Rovers	Mourneabbey	Black and amber	Quarter-finals	2021	5	1989
Deel Rovers	Milford	Blue and white	Group stage	2025	2	1991
Killavullen	Killavullen	Blue and white	Group stage	2013	4	2023
Kilshannig	Glantane	Blue and yellow	Semi-finals	?	10	2019
Liscarroll Churchtown Gaels	Churchtown	Green, white and yellow	Semi-finals	2017	1	2024
Mallow	Mallow	Red and yellow	Runners-up	2021	3	1984

== Roll of honour ==
=== By club ===
#	Club	Titles	Runners-up	Championship wins	Championship runner-up
1	Mitchelstown	27	8	1928, 1934, 1935, 1937, 1939, 1940, 1943, 1944, 1947, 1948, 1951, 1955, 1956, 1957, 1958, 1960, 1961, 1969, 1972, 1973, 1975, 1995, 2001, 2002, 2010, 2011, 2013	1930, 1931, 1953, 1988, 1991, 2000, 2003, 2012
2	Glanworth	14	11	1942, 1945, 1946, 1949, 1950, 1952, 1953, 1954, 1962, 1963, 1971, 2006, 2008, 2009	1933, 1943, 1947, 1951, 1966, 1967, 1968, 1969, 1970, 1990, 2002
3	Kilshannig	10	8	1959, 1965, 1967, 1968, 1976, 1982, 1985, 1996, 2014, 2019	1955, 1958, 1960, 1964, 1977, 1981, 2006, 2010
4	Fermoy	7	8	1926, 1936, 1941, 1974, 1993, 1997, 2003	1928, 1940, 1945, 1946, 1973, 1979, 1999, 2016
5	Grange	5	4	1964, 1966, 1970, 1977, 1979	1962, 1963, 1965, 1976
5	Clyda Rovers	5	4	1980, 1986, 1987, 1988, 1989	1978, 1983, 1984, 2011
5	Ballyclough	5	2	2004, 2005, 2012, 2015, 2016	1980, 2014
8	Kildorrery	4	4	1978, 1990, 1994, 2007	1974, 1975, 1986, 1989
8	Killavullen	4	0	1998, 1999, 2000, 2023	—
10	Charleville	4	8	2018, 2020, 2025, 2026	1926, 1934, 1936, 1937, 2015, 2022, 2023, 2024
11	Mallow	3	14	1929, 1933, 1984	1932, 1935, 1941, 1942, 1948, 1954, 1956, 1957, 1971, 1972, 1987, 1995, 2005, 2026
12	Deel Rovers	2	6	1981, 1991	1982, 1985, 1992, 1994, 1996, 1997,
12	Doneraile	2	4	1983, 1992	1944, 1993, 1998, 2001
12	Buttevant	2	4	2017, 2022	2013, 2018, 2020, 2021
12	Dromtarriffe	2	0	1930, 1932	—
12	Sons of Liberty	2	0	1931, 1938	—
17	Kilworth	1	4	2021	2007, 2008, 2017, 2019
17	Liscarroll Churchtown Gaels	1	1	2024	2025
17	Newmarket	1	0	1927	—
20	Araglen	0	2	—	1949, 1950
20	Abbey Rovers	0	2	—	1959, 1961
20	Oldcastletown	0	1	—	1927
20	Ballindangan	0	1	—	1938
20	Funcheon Vale	0	1	—	1939
20	Rathluirc Rovers	0	1	—	2004
20	Churchtown	0	1	—	2009

=== Notes ===
- Runners-up unknown: 1929, 1952

== List of finals ==
=== List of North Cork JAFC finals ===
Year	Winners		Runners-up		#
Year	Club	Score	Club	Score	#
2026	Charleville	3–05	Mallow	0–08	
2025	Charleville	0–18	Liscarroll Churchtown Gaels	0–13	
2024	Liscarroll Churchtown Gaels	1–13	Charleville	0–10	
2023	Killavullen	0–14	Charleville	0–06	
2022	Buttevant	1–09	Charleville	1–08	
2021	Kilworth	4–11	Buttevant	1–15	
2020	Charleville	2–16	Buttevant	0–10	
2019	Kilshannig	3–16	Kilworth	0–07	
2018	Charleville	4–14	Buttevant	1–12	
2017	Buttevant	2–13	Kilworth	1–09	
2016	Ballyclough	2–15	Fermoy	1–08	
2015	Ballyclough	2–11	Charleville	1–12	
2014	Kilshannig	2–15	Ballyclough	3–11	
2013	Mitchelstown	0–15	Buttevant	0–07	
2012	Ballyclough	0–10	Mitchelstown	0–07	
2011	Mitchelstown	2–22	Clyda Rovers	1–05	
2010	Mitchelstown	1–09	Kilshannig	1–06	
2009	Glanworth	1–15	Churchtown	2–03	
2008	Glanworth	1–09	Kilworth	0–09	
2007	Kildorrery	5–04	Kilworth	0–08	
2006	Glanworth	1–12	Kilshannig	0–09	
2005	Ballyclough	0–16	Mallow	1–09	
2004	Ballyclough	1–13	Rathluirc Rovers	1–05	
2003	Fermoy	1–08	Mitchelstown	0–08	
2002	Mitchelstown	0–19	Glanworth	2–08	
2001	Mitchelstown	3–15	Doneraile	0–08	
2000	Killavullen	0–15	Mitchelstown	0–09	
1999	Killavullen	1–18	Fermoy	0–07	
1998	Killavullen	2–17	Doneraile	1–05	
1997	Fermoy	3–13	Deel Rovers	2–10	
1996	Kilshannig	0–14	Deel Rovers	0–07	
1995	Mitchelstown	0–10	Mallow	0–06	
1994	Kildorrery	1–08	Deel Rovers	0–09	
1993	Fermoy	1–10	Doneraile	1–09	
1992	Doneraile	2–11	Deel Rovers	2–09	
1991	Deel Rovers	2–13	Mitchelstown	1–07	
1990	Kildorrery	0–09	Glanworth	0–07	
1989	Clyda Rovers	0–11	Kildorrery	1–06	
1988	Clyda Rovers	3–07	Mitchelstown	0–09	
1987	Clyda Rovers	2–08	Mallow	0–05	
1986	Clyda Rovers	2–08	Kildorrery	0–10	
1985	Kilshannig	3–05	Deel Rovers	1–08	
1984	Mallow	3–04	Clyda Rovers	0–06	
1983	Doneraile	2–05	Clyda Rovers	1–05	
1982	Kilshannig	2–06	Deel Rovers	0–02	
1981	Deel Rovers	1–09	Kilshannig	0–03	
1980	Clyda Rovers	1–16	Ballyclough	1–07	
1979	Grange	5–04	Fermoy	2–02	
1978	Kildorrery	2–11	Clyda Rovers	1–03	
1977	Grange	2–09	Kilshannig	2–02	
1976	Kilshannig	0–05	Grange	0–04	
1975	Mitchelstown	2–12	Kildorrery	0–12	
1974	Fermoy	1–08	Kildorrery	1–05	
1973	Mitchelstown	0–11	Fermoy	0–08	
1972	Mitchelstown	6–06	Mallow	1–08	
1971	Glanworth	3–08	Mallow	1–07	
1970	Grange	1–05	Glanworth	0–06	
1969	Mitchelstown	2–06	Glanworth	1–06	
1968	Kilshannig	2–07	Glanworth	1–05	
1967	Kilshannig	1–09	Glanworth	0–06	
1966	Grange	0–08	Glanworth	0–06	
1965	Kilshannig	1–04	Grange	0–05	
1964	Grange	1–05	Kilshannig	1–03	
1963	Glanworth	1–04	Grange	0–06	
1962	Glanworth	2–09	Grange	2–05	
1961	Mitchelstown	5–10	Abbey Rovers	1–03	
1960	Mitchelstown	3–10	Kilshannig	0–04	
1959	Kilshannig	1–08	Abbey Rovers	0–05	
1958	Mitchelstown	1–07	Kilshannig	2–02	
1957	Mitchelstown	3–12	Mallow	3–02	
1956	Mitchelstown	1–04	Mallow	0–03	
1955	Mitchelstown	2–05	Kilshannig	0–02	
1954	Glanworth	4–08	Mallow	1–01	
1953	Glanworth	2–05	Mitchelstown	0–02	
1952	Glanworth	5–07	Ballindangan	0–01	
1951	Mitchelstown	2–06	Glanworth	0–01	
1950	Glanworth	2–07	Araglen	0–01	
1949	Glanworth	2–06	Araglen	1–02	
1948	Mitchelstown	3–10	Mallow	1–03	
1947	Mitchelstown	3–06	Glanworth	1–01	
1946	Glanworth	3–04	Fermoy	2–00	
1945	Glanworth	2–04	Fermoy	1–01	
1944	Mitchelstown	1–06	Doneraile	2–02	
1943	Mitchelstown	2–04	Glanworth	0–02	
1942	Glanworth	1–00	Mallow	0–02	
1941	Fermoy	1–06	Mallow	2–01	
1940	Mitchelstown	2–02	Fermoy	0–06	
1939	Mitchelstown	1–01	Funcheon Vale	0–01	
1938	Sons Of Liberty	4–02	Ballindangan	0–03	
1937	Mitchelstown	8–03	Charleville	0–00	
1936	Fermoy	*	Charleville	*	
1935	Mitchelstown	3–05	Mallow	0–02	
1934	Mitchelstown	5–09	Charleville	0–01	
1933	Mallow	1–03	Glanworth	0–01	
1932	Dromtarriffe		Mallow		
1931	Sons Of Liberty	2–04	Blackthorns	1–02	
1930	Dromtarriffe	2–03	Mitchelstown	0–01	
1929	Mallow				
1928	Mitchelstown	1–04	Fermoy	1–00	
1927	Newmarket	W/O	Oldcastletown	SCR	
1926	Fermoy	2–02	Charleville	0–00	

=== Notes ===
- 2021 - The game ended in a draw and extra time was played.

== Records ==
=== By decade ===
The most successful team of each decade, judged by number of North Cork Junior Football Championship titles, is as follows:

- 1920s: 1 each for Fermoy (1926), Newmarket (1927), Mitchelstown (1928) and Mallow (1929)
- 1930s: 4 for Mitchelstown (1934-35-37-39)
- 1940s: 5 for Mitchelstown (1940-43-44-47-48)
- 1950s: 5 for Mitchelstown (1951-55-56-57-58)
- 1960s: 3 each for Mitchelstown (1960-61-69) and Kilshannig (1965-67-68)
- 1970s: 3 each for Grange (1970-77-79) and Mitchelstown (1972-73-75)
- 1980s: 5 for Clyda Rovers (1980-86-87-88-89)
- 1990s: 2 each for Kildorrery (1990-94), Fermoy (1993-97) and Killavullen (1998-99)
- 2000s: 3 for Glanworth (2006-08-09)
- 2010s: 3 each for Mitchelstown (2010-11-13) and Ballyclough (2012-15-16)

=== Gaps ===
Top ten longest gaps between successive championship titles:

- 51 years: Mallow (1933-1984)
- 35 years: Glanworth (1971-2006)
- 33 years: Fermoy (1941-1974)
- 23 years: Killavullen (2000-2023)
- 20 years: Mitchelstown (1975-1995)
- 19 years: Fermoy (1974-1993)
- 18 years: Kilshannig (1996-2014)
- 13 years: Kildorrery (1994-2007)
- 12 years: Kilshannig (1978-1990)
- 10 years: Fermoy (1926-1936)
- 10 years: Deel Rovers (1981-1991)

== See also ==
- North Cork Junior A Hurling Championship
