= Tom Mannix =

Irish Gaelic footballer

Personal information
- Native name: Tomás Ó Mainchín (Irish)
- Born: 1963 (age 62–63) Shanballymore, County Cork, Ireland

Sport
- Sport: Gaelic football
- Position: Midfield
Clubs
- Years: Club
- Dr. Croke's; Shanballymore; Clonakilty
Club titles
- Cork titles: 1
Inter-county
Years	County	Apps (scores)
1984–1987	Cork	2 (0-02)
Inter-county titles
- Munster titles: 0
- All-Irelands: 0
- NFL: 0
- All Stars: 0

Thomas Mannix (born 1963), better known as Tom Mannix, is an Irish retired Gaelic footballer. His league and championship career with the Cork senior team lasted two seasons from 1984 to 1987.

Born in Shanballymore, County Cork, Mannix first played competitive Gaelic football at juvenile and underage levels with the Dr. Croke's amalgamation. He later joined the Shanballymore club, winning a county junior championship as a hurler in 1996. Mannix enjoyed a concurrent Gaelic football career with Clonakilty, culminating with the winning of a county senior championship.

Mannix made his debut on the inter-county scene at the age of seventeen when he was selected for the Cork minor team. He enjoyed one championship season with the minor team, culminating with the winning of an All-Ireland medal in 1981. Mannix subsequently joined the Cork under-21 team, winning an All-Ireland medal in 1984. He also won an All-Ireland medal as a non-playing substitute with the junior team in 1990. By this stage Mannix had also played for the Cork senior team, making his debut during the 1984–85 league. Over the course of the next few seasons he was a regular on the starting fifteen, however, he ended his senior career without any major success.
