= 1942 Cork Intermediate Hurling Championship =

Irish hurling competition

- Champions: Lough Rovers (2nd title)
- Runners-up: Carrigtwohill

The 1942 Cork Intermediate Hurling Championship was the 33rd staging of the Cork Intermediate Hurling Championship since its establishment by the Cork County Board in 1909.

The final was played on 11 October 1942 at the Athletic Grounds in Cork, between Lough Rovers and Carrigtwohill, in what was their first ever meeting in the final. Lough Rovers won the match by 3–05 to 3–02 to claim their second championship title overall and a first championship title in nine years.

== Results ==
=== Final ===
11 October 1942 Final	Lough Rovers	3-05 – 3-02	Carrigtwohill	Cork Athletic Grounds
