= 1952 Cork Senior Hurling Championship =

Annual hurling competition season

- Dates: 27 April 1952 – 5 October 1952
- Teams: 16
- Champions: Avondhu (1st title); Tom Galvin (captain)
- Runners-up: St. Finbarr's; Mossie Finn (captain)

Tournament statistics
- Matches played: 17
- Goals scored: 97 (5.71 per match)
- Points scored: 207 (12.18 per match)

The 1952 Cork Senior Hurling Championship was the 63rd staging of the Cork Senior Hurling Championship since its establishment by the Cork County Board in 1887. The draw for the opening round fixtures took place at the Cork Convention on 20 January 1952. The championship began on 27 April 1952 and ended on 5 October 1952.

Sarsfields were the defending champions, however, they were defeated by Avondhu in the first round.

On 5 October 1952, Avondhu won the championship following a 3–08 to 4–04 defeat of St. Finbarr's in a replay of the final. This was their first championship title ever.

== Team changes ==
=== To Championship ===
Promoted from the Cork Intermediate Hurling Championship

- Ballincollig
- Midleton
- Shanballymore

=== From Championship ===
Declined to field a team

- Seandún

== Results ==
=== First round ===
27 April 1952 First round	Midleton	5-07 - 3-08	University College Cork	Páirc Uí Chonaill, Cobh
				Referee: B Barrett (St. Finbarr's)

4 May 1952 First round	Blackrock	6-07 - 1-02	Muskerry	Ballincollig Sportsfield, Ballincollig

11 May 1952 First round	Imokilly	4-07 - 2-05	Carbery	Cork Athletic Grounds, Cork
				Referee: C Conway (Blarney)

11 May 1952 First round	St. Finbarr's	1-06 - 0-05	Shanballymore	Buttevant Sportsfield, Buttevant
				Referee: M O'Mahony (Buttevant)

18 May 1952 First round	Avondhu	3-04 - 3-04	Sarsfields	Fitzgerald Memorial Park, Fermoy
				Referee: C Conway (Blarney)

18 May 1952 First round	Duhallow	6-05 - 0-03	Ballincollig	Bishop Casey Memorial Park, Mallow
				Referee: W Clancy (Mallow)

27 May 1952 First round	Carrigtwohill	0-12 - 2-05	Glen Rovers	Cork Athletic Grounds, Cork
				Referee: J O'Mahony (Passage)

8 June 1952 First round	Carrigdhoun	4-06 - 3-05	Charleville	Cork Athletic Grounds, Cork
				Referee: F Barrett (St. Finbarr's)

29 June 1952 First round replay	Avondhu	3-13 - 5-04	Sarsfields	Fitzgerald Memorial Park, Fermoy
				Referee: C Conway (Blarney)

=== Second round ===
29 June 1952 Second round	Carrigtwohill	7-03 - 2-05	Midleton	Cork Athletic Grounds, Cork
				Referee: J O'Mahony (Passage)

10 August 1952 Second round	Avondhu	0-10 - 1-05	Imokilly	Cork Athletic Grounds, Cork
				Referee: C Conway (Blarney)

10 August 1952 Second round	Carrigdhoun	6-08 - 2-03	Duhallow	Bishop Casey Memorial Park, Mallow
				Referee: M O'Mahony (Buttevant)

6 July 1952 Second round	Blackrock	1-10 - 4-03	St. Finbarr's	Cork Athletic Grounds, Cork
				Referee: C Murphy (Valley Rovers)

=== Semi-finals ===
24 August 1952 Semi-final	St. Finbarr's	2-07 - 1-09	Carrigtwohill	Cork Athletic Grounds, Cork
				Referee: C Conway (Blarney)

31 August 1952 Semi-final	Avondhu	3-08 - 3-06	Carrigdhoun	Cork Athletic Grounds, Cork
				Referee: C Conway (Blarney)

=== Finals ===
21 September 1952 Final	Avondhu	3-09 - 4-06	St. Finbarr's	Cork Athletic Grounds, Cork
	M Fahy 1-4, T McAuliffe 1-1, J Walsh 1-0, D Murray 0-3, T O'Sullivan 0-1.		H Goldboro 2-2, M O'Driscoll 1-0, S Ó Ceallacháin 1-0, M Finn 0-3, J O'Grady 0-1,	Referee: C Murphy (Valley Rovers)

5 October 1952 Final replay	Avondhu	3-08 - 4-03	St. Finbarr's	Cork Athletic Grounds, Cork
	P Dwane 2-1, M Fahy 0-4, J Walsh 1-0, T O'Sullivan 0-1, P Finn 0-1, E McAuliffe 0-1,		M Kickham 3-0, M Finn 0-2, S Ó Ceallacháin 1-0, A O'Shuaghnessy 0-1.	Referee: C Murphy (Valley Rovers)

== Championship statistics ==
=== Miscellaneous ===
- Avondhu became the first divisional team to win the county championship.
- For the first time ever the titles fails to go to a city club for a second season in a row.
