= Paul O'Flynn (Gaelic footballer) =

Irish Gaelic footballer

Personal information
- Native name: Pól Ó Floinn (Irish)
- Born: Ballyclough, County Cork, Ireland

Sport
- Sport: Gaelic football
- Position: Right wing-forward
Club
- Years: Club
- 2005-2012: Ballyclough
Club titles
- Cork titles: 0
Inter-county
Years	County	Apps (scores)
2009-2011	Cork	3 (0-2)
Inter-county titles
- Munster titles: 1
- All-Irelands: 1
- NFL: 2
- All Stars: 0

Paul O'Flynn (born 2 August 1985 in Ballyclough, County Cork) is an Irish sportsperson.

He plays Gaelic football with his local club Ballyclough and has been a member of the Cork senior inter-county team since 2009. He captained the CIT victorious Sigerson winning side to their first title. He is the son of Thomas and Lily O'Flynn and has two brothers David and Thomas.
