= 1952 Cork Junior Hurling Championship =

Irish hurling competition

- Teams: 7
- Champions: Ballymartle (1st title)
- Runners-up: Lough Rovers

The 1952 Cork Junior Hurling Championship was the 55th staging of the Cork Junior Hurling Championship since its establishment by the Cork County Board in 1895.

The final, a replay, was played on 7 December 1952 at the Athletic Grounds in Carrigaline, between Ballymartle and Lough Rovers, in what was their first ever meeting in the final. Ballymartle won the match by 2-10 to 3-05 to claim their first ever championship title.

== Results ==
=== Final ===
| 23 November 1952 Final | Ballymartle | 3-06 - 4-03 | Lough Rovers | Carrigaline Grounds |

=== Final replay ===
| 7 December 1952 Final replay | Ballymartle | 2-10 - 3-05 | Lough Rovers | Carrigaline Grounds |
