= Araglin =

Village in Counties Cork, Tipperary and Waterford in Ireland

Coordinates: 52°12′26″N 8°06′25″W

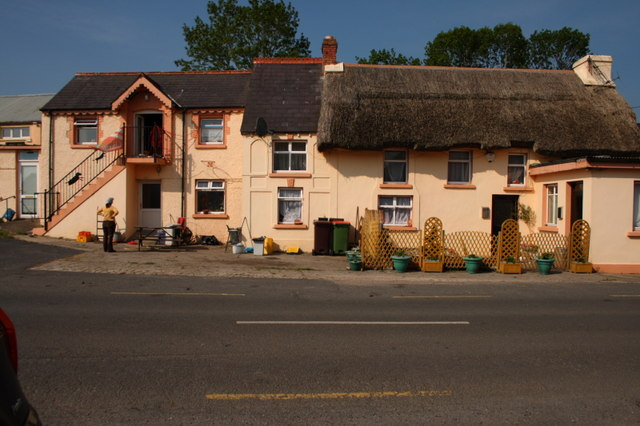
Thatched building in Araglin village

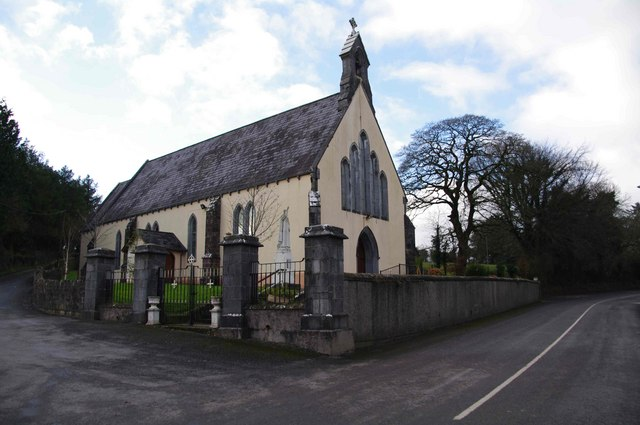
Catholic church (built c. 1860) at Billeragh East near Araglin

Araglin (Irish: Airglinn), also known as Araglen, is a village on the border between counties Cork, Tipperary and Waterford in Ireland. It is approximately 17 km east of Fermoy, County Cork, 8 km south of Ballyporeen, County Tipperary and 18 km northwest of Lismore, County Waterford. The surrounding ecclesiastical parish, of Kilworth-Araglin, is in the Roman Catholic Diocese of Cloyne.

== History ==
Evidence of ancient settlement in the area includes ringfort and fulacht fiadh sites in the neighbouring townlands of Propoge and Lyre.

Araglin Cottage, in the townland of Billeragh East, is a Tudor Revival-style cottage which dates to 1838. It was designed by architect Charles Frederick Anderson for Robert King, 4th Earl of Kingston. The local Catholic church, the Church of the Immaculate Conception, is also located in Billeragh East and was built c. 1860. Araglen Community Hall, within the village, was built in the late 1960s.

In April 1919, during the Irish War of Independence, the Royal Irish Constabulary (RIC) barracks at Araglin was captured by an Irish Republican Army force under Michael Fitzgerald.

== Sport ==
The local GAA club, Araglen GAA, takes its players from the broader parish of Araglen which spans the counties of Cork, Tipperary and Waterford. The club, which competes in the Avondhu division in north Cork, has its grounds to the east of the village in County Tipperary. There is also a racquetball club based in the area.

== See also ==
- Kilworth, County Cork
- Ballyduff, County Waterford
