= Paudie Kissane =

Cork Gaelic footballer

Personal information
- Native name: Páidí Ó Ciosáin (Irish)
- Born: 1 March 1980 (age 46) Cork, Ireland
- Occupation: Games Development Officer
- Height: 1.85 m (6 ft 1 in)

Sport
- Sport: Gaelic football
- Position: Left wing-back
Club
- Years: Club
- Clyda Rovers
Club titles
- Cork titles: 0
Inter-county*
| Years | County | Apps (scores) |
| 2002–2013 | Cork | 24 (0–6) |
Inter-county titles
- Munster titles: 2
- All-Irelands: 1
- NFL: 3
- All Stars: 1
- *Inter County team apps and scores correct as of 13:03, 6 September 2014.

Paudie Kissane (born 1 March 1980) is an Irish strength and conditioning coach and former Gaelic footballer who played as a left wing-back at senior level for the Cork county team.

== Playing career ==
Born in Whitechurch, County Cork, Kissane arrived on the inter-county scene at the age of eighteen when he first linked up with the Cork minor team, before later joining the under-21 and junior sides. He made his debut in the 2002 National Football League. Kissane went on to play a key part on and off the team for over a decade, and won one All-Ireland medal, two Munster medals and three National Football League medals. He was an All-Ireland runner-up on one occasion.

Kissane represented the Munster inter-provincial team on a number of occasions throughout his career. At club level he began his career with Whitechurch before later winning a premier intermediate championship medal with Clyda Rovers.

Throughout his career, Kissane made 24 championship appearances for Cork. He announced his retirement from inter-county football on 30 October 2013.

== Coaching career ==
In retirement from play Kissane immediately became involved in coaching and team management. He served a one-year stint as coach to the senior Clare county team.

As of 2022, Kissane had worked as a strength and conditioning coach with the Cork, Limerick, Clare and Tipperary county football teams.

== Honours ==
Clyda Rovers

- Cork Premier Intermediate Football Championship (1): 2013
- Munster Intermediate Club Football Championship (1): 2013

Cork

- All-Ireland Senior Football Championship (1): 2010
- Munster Senior Football Championship (2): 2009, 2012
- National Football League (3): 2010, 2011, 2012
- All-Ireland Junior Football Championship (1): 2007
- Munster Junior Football Championship (1): 2007
