= Churchtown GAA =

Gaelic Athletic Association club in County Cork, Ireland

Churchtown
- County: Cork
- Colours: Green and yellow
- Grounds: Churchtown

Playing kits
Standard colours

Senior Club Championships
| | All Ireland | Munster champions | Cork champions |
|---|---|---|---|
| Hurling: | 0 | 0 | 0 |

Churchtown GAA is a Gaelic Athletic Association club located in the village of Churchtown in County Cork, Ireland. The club field teams in hurling and Gaelic football. The club plays in the Avondhu division of Cork GAA. The club has merged with neighbours Liscarroll under the name of Liscarroll Churchtown Gaels.

== Honours ==
- North Cork Junior A Hurling Championship
  - (gold) Winners (1): 1929
  - (silver) Runners-Up (1): 2010
- North Cork Junior A Football Championship
  - (silver) Runners-Up (1): 2009
- Cork Junior B Football Championship
  - (silver) Runners-Up (1): 2006

== See also ==
- Liscarroll Churchtown Gaels GAA
- Avondhu GAA
