= Colin O'Brien (hurler) =

Irish hurler

Personal information
- Native name: Cóilín Ó Briain (Irish)
- Born: 2000 (age 25–26) Liscarroll, County Cork, Ireland
- Occupation: Student

Sport
- Sport: Hurling
- Position: Left corner-forward
Clubs
- Years: Club
- Liscarroll Churchtown Gaels → Avondhu
Club titles
- Cork titles: 0
College
- Years: College
- Mary Immaculate College
College titles
- Fitzgibbon titles: 1
Inter-county*
Years	County	Apps (scores)
2021-present	Cork	0 (0-00)
Inter-county titles
- Munster titles: 0
- All-Irelands: 0
- NHL: 0
- All Stars: 0
- *Inter County team apps and scores correct as of 12:25, 13 February 2022.

Colin O'Brien (born 2000) is an Irish hurler who plays for club side Liscarroll Churchtown Gaels and at inter-county level with the Cork senior hurling team. He usually lines out as a forward.

== Career ==
O'Brien first came to prominence at juvenile and underage levels with the Liscarroll Churchtown Gaels combination. He first appeared on the inter-county scene as a corner-forward on the Cork under-17 team that won the one-off All-Ireland Under-17 Championship in 2017. O'Brien was also a member of the Cork minor team that lost the 2017 All-Ireland minor final to Galway. He progressed onto the under-20 team and won an All-Ireland Under-20 Championship title in 2020. O'Brien joined the Cork senior hurling team as a member of the extended training panel in 2021 and made his debut against Offaly in the 2022 National League.

== Career statistics ==
As of match played 13 February 2022.

Team	Year	National League			Munster		All-Ireland		Total	
Team	Year	Division	Apps	Score	Apps	Score	Apps	Score	Apps	Score
Cork	2021	Division 1A	—		—		0	0-00	0	0-00
Cork	2022	Division 1A	1	0-01	0	0-00	0	0-00	1	0-01
Career total			1	0-01	0	0-00	0	0-00	1	0-01

== Honours ==
Mary Immaculate College

- Fitzgibbon Cup: 2024 (c)

Cork

- All-Ireland Under-20 Hurling Championship: 2020
- Munster Under-20 Hurling Championship: 2020
- Munster Minor Hurling Championship: 2017
- All-Ireland Under-17 Hurling Championship: 2017
- Munster Under-17 Hurling Championship: 2017
