= St John's GAA (Cork) =

Gaelic Athletic Association sports club

St John's
- Naomh Eoin
- Founded: 2010
- County: Cork
- Colours: Red and amber
- Grounds: Station Road, Millstreet

Playing kits
Standard colours

St John's GAA is a Gaelic Athletic Association club representing the areas of Aubane, Kilcorney and Mushera in the north west of County Cork, Ireland. The club plays Gaelic football only and, as of 2019, was competing in the Duhallow Junior B Football Championship. Founded in 2010, the club adopted the St John's name after a nearby holy well at the foot of Musheramore.

== Honours ==
- Duhallow Junior B Football Championship (3): 2017, 2018, 2019
- Cork Junior C Football Championship (1): 2019
- Cork Junior B Football League (1): 2018
