= Liscarroll GAA =

Gaelic games club in County Cork, Ireland

Liscarroll
- Lios Uí Chearbhaill
- County: Cork
- Colours: Green and yellow
- Grounds: Liscarroll

Playing kits
Standard colours

Senior Club Championships
	All Ireland	Munster champions	Cork champions
Hurling:	0	0	0

Liscarroll GAA is a Gaelic Athletic Association club located in the village of Liscarroll in County Cork, Ireland. The club is exclusively concerned with the game of hurling while their governing club, Churchtown, field teams in hurling and Gaelic football. The club plays in the Avondhu division of Cork GAA.

== Honours ==
- Cork Junior Hurling Championship (1): 1934
- Cork Junior B Hurling Championship: Winners (1) 1987
- North Cork Junior A Hurling Championship (2): 1932, 1934

== See also ==
- Liscarroll Churchtown Gaels GAA
- Avondhu GAA
