= Liscarroll/Churchtown Gaels GAA =

Liscarroll/Churchtown Gaels
- Na Gaeil Lios Uí Chearbhaill/Brugh Thuinne
- Founded: 2017
- County: Cork
- Nickname: The Gaels
- Colours: Green, white and gold
- Grounds: Churchtown GAA Grounds; Liscarroll GAA Ground

Playing kits
Standard colours

Liscarroll/Churchtown Gaels GAA is a Gaelic Athletic Association club located in the parish of Churchtown-Liscarroll, County Cork, Ireland. The club fields teams in both hurling and Gaelic football.

== History ==
Gaelic games had been played in the parish of Churchtown-Liscarroll since the early days of the Gaelic Athletic Association. Liscarroll GAA Club was established in 1885, while the Churchtown GAA Club was formed five years later in 1890. Both clubs spent the majority of their existence operating in the various North Cork junior grades. An amalgamation at juvenile and underage levels was followed by a similar alliance at adult level in 2017 with the creation of the new Liscarroll/Churchtown Gaels club.

== Honours ==
- North Cork Junior A Football Championship: 2024
- North Cork Under-21 C Hurling Championship: 2021
- North Cork Under-17 Division 2 Hurling Championship: 2021

== Notable players ==
- Colin O'Brien: Fitzgibbon Cup-winning captain (2024)
