= Glanworth GAA =

Gaelic football club in County Cork

- CLG Gleannúir
- County: Cork
- Colours: Green & white

Playing kits
Standard colours

Senior Club Championships
	All Ireland	Munster champions	Cork champions
Ladies' football:	–	–	7

Glanworth GAA is a Gaelic Athletic Association club based in the parish of Glanworth, County Cork in Ireland. The club draws players from Glanworth and Ballindangan and fields teams in competitions organised by the Cork GAA county board and the Avondhu GAA divisional board. The club plays under the name Glanworth in Gaelic football, under St. Dominic's (along with Shanballymore players) for under 13s - under 21s, and under the name Harbour Rovers in hurling. The club has traditionally been most successful in football. As of 2023, the club played in the Cork Intermediate A Football Championship, and in the North Cork Junior A Hurling Championship. Glanworth also has a Ladies Gaelic Football Association (Glanworth LGFA). Glanworth LGFA runs a "Mothers and Others" football club for women aged 25 and over who do not currently play in any league/championship.

The club crest depicts Glanworth's castle and bridge as well as the River Funshion, and resembles the crest of Tallow.

== Achievements ==
- Cork Intermediate A Football Championship (1): 1976
- Cork Junior A Football Championship (3): 1954, 1971, 2009
- Cork Junior A Hurling Championship (0): Runners-Up 2020, 2023
- Cork Minor Football Championship (2): 1966, 1967
- Cork Minor B Hurling Championship (1): 2001
- Cork Minor C Hurling Championship (1): 2000
- North Cork Junior A Football Championship (13): 1942, 1945, 1946, 1949, 1950, 1954, 1955, 1962, 1963, 1971, 2006, 2008, 2009
- North Cork Junior A Hurling Championship (2): 2015, 2016, 2020, 2023

== Notable players ==
- Ned Kirby - played with 1966 Cork Minor Football Team
- Donal Aherne - Captain of Cork Minor All Ireland winning Football team 1967, 1968
