= Clyda Rovers GAA =

Gaelic sports club in County Cork, Ireland

Clyda Rovers
- Fánaithe na Claide
- Founded: 1945
- County: Cork
- Nickname: Clyda
- Colours
- Grounds: Mourne Abbey
- Coordinates: 52°04′58.88″N 8°37′52.32″W

Playing kits
Standard colours

Clyda Rovers is a Gaelic Athletic Association club based in the parish of Mourneabbey in County Cork, Ireland. The name of the club comes from the river which runs throughout the parish on its way to meet the River Blackwater. The club fields both senior Gaelic football and junior hurling teams. It is a member of Avondhu division of Cork GAA.

== History ==
The club was founded by Fr. James Moynihan in 1888 with the original name "Mourneabbey". It was originally an all-hurling club but, from 1923, the club began to compete in Gaelic football also. Records show that Mourneabbey were runners-up in a Junior football county final against Canovee. Throughout the 1920s, 1930s and 1940s, the club played with little success. Mourneabbey GAA club was renamed Clyda Rovers in 1945 after the River Clyda which flows through the parish of Mourneabbey on its way to join the River Blackwater.

In the mid-1950s, hurling became strongest in the parish and a first North Cork title was won in Novice Grade in 1955. A football title followed in 1956. In the 1960s, the club won a number of novice football Cork titles. This included a title win in 1967.

In 1980, Clyda Rovers won their first ever Junior A Football North Cork when they defeated Ballyclough in the final. Clyda went on to win seven North Cork titles throughout the 1980s. This included five in football and two in hurling. They also contested three County Junior finals - losing two football finals but winning the Junior A Hurling County against Ballinscarthy in 1989.

The 1990s began with Clyda Rovers GAA having 2 Intermediate teams in football and in hurling. The footballers reached one county final and three semi-finals where they were narrowly defeated each time. However, in September 1996, Clyda defeated Carrigaline to win their first Cork Intermediate Football Championship title. Following the win, Clyda was promoted to the Senior grade in football for the first time.

Clyda reached the semi-final of the Cork Senior Football Championship in 2000 and were beaten by eventual champions Nemo Rangers. The club regraded to Premier Intermediate Football in 2006. Between the years 2009 and 2011, the club contested three Premier Intermediate finals but lost on each occasion to Valley Rovers, Newcestown and Newmarket. In 2010, the club won its first ever minor hurling county when they defeated St Marks in the Cork Minor B Hurling Championship final.

In 2013, Clyda brought home the Premier Intermediate Football title when they defeated Macroom in the county final by 13 points to 8 to secure a second intermediate county title in football. The team then went on to reach the 2013 Munster Intermediate Club Football Championship final where they played St Josephs Milltown Malbay and won on a scoreline of 0–10 to 0–07.

Two club players, Ray Carey and Paudie Kissane, were members of the Cork Senior Football squad that won the 2010 All-Ireland Senior Football Championship title when Cork defeated Down 16 points to 15 in the final. In 2019, Conor Corbett captained the Cork Minor Footballers to All Ireland success when they defeated Galway in the final at Croke Park. In August 2021, the first ever All Ireland hurling medal came to the club where Ben Nyhan was a player on the Cork Minor hurling team that won All Ireland honours.

Clyda's sister club, Mourneabbey Ladies Football, has won All-Ireland club titles at Junior grade (in 2005) and Intermediate grade (in 2007). The Mourneabbey club also contested three Senior club finals in 2014, 2015 and 2017, finally landing the All Ireland Senior title in 2018. The following year, they retained their All Ireland title.

Mourneabbey Complex

In 2000, Clyda Rovers were considering a move away from their base in the community centre – as the facilities were now not able to cater to the growing demands of the club. However, once land alongside the current community centre came up for sale, Clyda Rovers came to an agreement with Mourneabbey Community Council. Between 2001 and 2022, over €1.9 million was spent developing new facilities in Mourneabbey. These included new dressing rooms and the laying of two new pitches – the main one having 400 lux floodlighting. In 2018, a new astroturf pitch was opened.

The club has printed three club history books: 1884–1984 Clyda Rovers GAA Club History, 1985–1996 Come on Clyda, and 1997–2013 A Community of Champions.

== Honours ==
- Munster Intermediate Club Football Championship: (1) 2013
- Cork Premier Intermediate Football Championship: (1) 2013
- Cork Intermediate Football Championship: (1) 1996
- Cork Junior A Hurling Championship: (1) 1989
- Cork County Minor B Football Championship: (1) 1999
- Cork County Minor B Hurling Championship: (1) 2010
- Cork County Division 2 Football League: (1) 2014
- Cork County Intermediate Football Leagues: (2) 1991, 2011
- Cork County Minor B Football League: (2) 1999, 2018
- Cork County Minor A Football League: (1) 2009
- Cork County Minor C Hurling League: (1) 2015
- North Cork Junior A Football Championship: (5) 1980, 1986, 1987, 1988, 1989
- North Cork Junior A Hurling Championship: (3) 1985, 1989, 2019

== Notable players ==
- Ray Carey
- Paudie Kissane
- Conor Corbett

== External sources ==
- Clyda Rovers Home Page
