= Ballygiblin GAA =

GAA club in Cork, Ireland

Ballygiblin
- Baile Ghiblín
- Founded: 1955
- County: Cork
- Nickname: Crossroads
- Colours: Red and white
- Grounds: Gurteenaboul

Playing kits
Standard colours

Senior Club Championships
	All Ireland	Munster champions	Cork champions
Hurling:	0	0	0

Ballygiblin GAA is a Gaelic Athletic Association club located outside Mitchelstown, County Cork, Ireland. The club, a sister club of Mitchelstown, is solely concerned with the game of hurling.

== History ==
Located on the Cork-Limerick-Tipperary border, Ballygiblin GAA Club was founded in 1955. The club initially didn't even have a set of jerseys, however, they procured a set from the recently disbanded Mitchelstown RFC. The club enjoyed its first success in 1963 when the novice hurlers won the divisional title. This was later followed by a North Cork JBHC title in 1979. A series of development and fundraising events resulted in the club opening their new grounds in 1984.

The turn of the century brought Ballygiblin's greatest era of success, with the North Cork JAHC being claimed for the first time after a defeat of Kilworth in 2004. The club secured further North Cork titles in 2018 and 2021. The latter victory was subsequently followed by a Munster Club JHC title before Ballygiblin faced a one-point defeat by Mooncoin in the All-Ireland final.

Ballygiblin became the inaugural winners of the Cork PJHC in 2022. After becoming the first team to retain the Munster Club JHC title, Ballygiblin claimed the All-Ireland Club JHC title after a 1-16 to 0-11 defeat of Easkey.

== Honours ==
- All-Ireland Junior Club Hurling Championship
  - (gold) Winners (1): 2023
  - (silver) Runners-Up (1): 2022
- Munster Junior Club Hurling Championship
  - (gold) Winners (2): 2021, 2022
- Cork Premier Junior Hurling Championship
  - (gold) Winners (1): 2022
- Cork Junior A Hurling Championship
  - (gold) Winners (1): 2021
- North Cork Junior A Hurling Championship
  - (gold) Winners (3): 2004, 2018, 2021
  - (silver) Runners-Up (1): 2003
- Cork Minor A Hurling Championship
  - (gold) Winners (1): 2016

== Notable players ==
- Darragh Flynn
- Bob Honohan
- Mark Keane
- Cathail O'Mahoney
