= Ballyhooly GAA =

Gaelic games club in County Cork, Ireland

Ballyhooly
- Baile Átha hÚlla
- County: Cork
- Colours: royal and amber
- Grounds: ballyhooly community sports field

Playing kits
Standard colours

Senior Club Championships
| | All Ireland | Munster champions | Cork champions |
|---|---|---|---|
| Football: | 0 | 0 | 0 |

Ballyhooly GAA is a Gaelic Athletic Association club located in the village of Ballyhooly, County Cork, Ireland. The club fields teams in both hurling and Gaelic football. The club plays in the Avondhu division of Cork GAA. The club competes in the north cork junior a football and hurling championships. At underage Ballyhooly is joined with Castletownroche as Ballycastle Gaels. From 2001 to 2015 at Under 16, Minor & Under-21 they were joined with Killavullen as Blackwater Rovers

== Honours ==
- Cork Junior B Football Championship (1): 2016
- Cork Junior B Hurling Championship Winners (2) 1985,1995
- North Cork Junior A Hurling Championship Runners up 1945 1946 2016 2017 2026
- North Cork division 1 Hurling league Winners (2) 2017 2026
- North Cork Junior B Hurling Championship Winners (4) 1985 1992 1995 2008
- North Cork Junior B Football Championship Winners (5) 1966 1975 2001 2003 2004
- North Cork Division 4 Hurling League Winners (1) 2025
- Rebel óg north g6 football league' winners (1) (ballycastle gaels)'
- . north cork under 21 c hurling championship winners (4) 1997 2002 2008 2024
- . north cork under 21 b hurling championship winners (1) 2026
- . north cork under 21 c football championship winners (3) 2002 2004 2008
- . north cork minor b football league winner (2) 2003 2004
- . north cork minor c football championship winners (1) 1992
- . north cork minor b hurling championship winners (3) 1997 2003 2006
- . north cork minor b football championship winners (1) 2004
- . north cork minir a football league winners (1) 1987
- . north cork minor b hurling league winners (1) 1996
- .
