= Killavullen GAA =

Gaelic games club in County Cork, Ireland

Killavullen
- Cill an Mhuilinn
- Founded: 1888
- County: Cork
- Colours
- Grounds: The Mill Field
- Coordinates: 52°08′55″N 8°30′45″W

Playing kits
Standard colours

Killavullen GAA is a Gaelic Athletic Association club based in the parish of Killavullen, County Cork, Ireland. The club fields teams in competitions organized by the Cork GAA county board and the Avondhu GAA divisional board. The club fields teams in both hurling and Gaelic football.

== History ==
Killavullen GAA club is one of the oldest official clubs in North Cork, having been founded on 15 February 1888 under the auspices of the then newly formed Gaelic Athletic Association. With the exception of a North Cork Junior hurling championship that they annexed in 1929, the club toiled away without much success. Persistence paid off in 1962 when the club contested the final of the Avondhu Novice hurling Championship and won this competition in 1968. The club made a breakthrough in football in 1963, which was the club's first football title. They went out to further glory in 1979 when they were crowned North Cork Junior (B) Hurling League Champions.

== Honours ==
- Cork Junior A Football Championship (1): 2000
- North Cork Junior A Football Championship (4): 1998, 1999, 2000, 2023
- North Cork Junior A Hurling Championship (1): 2024
- Munster Junior B Club Hurling Championship (1): 2017
- Cork Junior B Hurling Championship (1): 2017
- North Cork Junior B Hurling Championship (2): 1981, 2012
- Cork Minor B Hurling Championship (2): 1994, 2019
