= Araglen GAA =

Gaelic games club in County Cork, Ireland

Araglen
- Airglinn
- Founded: 1968
- County: Cork
- Colours: Green and white
- Grounds: Araglen Community Field

Playing kits
Standard colours

Araglen GAA is a Gaelic Athletic Association club located on the Cork, Tipperary and Waterford borders in Ireland. The club, part of the Avondhu division in Cork, fields teams in both hurling and Gaelic football.

== History ==
While Gaelic games may have been played in the Araglen area since the foundation of the GAA, and Gaelic football and hurling teams fielded locally from the early 20th century, Araglen GAA was officially established in 1968 with the amalgamation of Araglen Hurling Club and St. Michael's Gaelic Football Club. Although geographically located in Tipperary and featuring some Waterford representation, it was decided to affiliate to the Cork County Board. The club fielded teams at Junior B divisional level throughout the 1980s and 1990s, with the first major success arriving in 1999 with the Cork Junior B Hurling Championship title. A second title in the grade was secured in 2020, before Araglen won the Cork JCFC title in 2021.

== Honours ==
- Cork Junior B Hurling Championship (3): 1999, 2020, 2026
- Cork Junior C Football Championship (1): 2021
