= Lough Rovers GAA =

Gaelic games club in Cork, Ireland

Lough Rovers
- Fánaithe na Locha
- Founded: 1928
- County: Cork
- Nickname: Gallant Lough Rovers
- Colours: Red and white

Playing kits
Standard colours

Senior Club Championships
	All Ireland	Munster champions	Cork champions
Football:	0	0	0
Hurling:	0	0	0

Lough Rovers H&F GAA is a Gaelic Athletic Association club located on the Carrigrohane Rd., Cork, Ireland. The club fields teams in both hurling and Gaelic football.

== Honours ==
- Cork Intermediate Hurling Championship (2): 1933, 1942
- Cork Junior Hurling Championship (1): 1932
- City Junior A Hurling Championship (4): 1932, 1948, 1952, 1959
- Cork Junior B Hurling Championship Runner-Up 2005,2019
- City Junior A Football Championship (1): 1986
- Cork Junior C Football Championship (2): 2017, 2020
- Craobh Rua Hurling Cup Champions (3) 1979, 1980, 2018
- Ballinlough Hurling Cup Champions, 2024
