= Ballyclough GAA =

Gaelic games club in County Cork, Ireland

Ballyclough
- Baile na gCloch
- County: Cork
- Colours: Green and yellow
- Grounds: Dr. Croke Park

Playing kits
Standard colours

Ballyclough GAA is a Gaelic Athletic Association club located in the village of Ballyclough, County Cork, Ireland. The club fields teams in both hurling and Gaelic football.

== History ==
Located in the village of Ballyclough, the club is affiliated to the North Cork Board and has spent its entire existence operating in the junior grade. It wasn't until the turn of the 21st century that Ballyclough started to enjoy success, winning five North Cork JAFC titles between 2004 and 2016. The club won its only county level title in 2014 when Dromtarriffe were beaten in a replay to take the Cork JBHC title.

== Honours ==
- North Cork Junior A Football Championship (5): 2004, 2005, 2012, 2015, 2016
- Cork Junior B Hurling Championship (2): 2014, 2025

== Notable players ==
- Paul O'Flynn: All-Ireland SFC-winner (2010) 2009 Sigerson Cup winning captain.
- Colm O'Neill: All-Ireland SFC-winner (2010)
