= Shanballymore GAA =

GAA club in Cork, Ireland

- CLG An Seanbhaile Mór
- Founded: 1958
- County: Cork
- Colours: Red and Black

Playing kits
Standard colours

Shanballymore GAA is a Gaelic Athletic Association club, based in the village of Shanballymore, located in the northern part of County Cork, Ireland. The club fields both Gaelic football and hurling teams. It is a member of the Avondhu division of Cork GAA.

== History ==
The club has been in existence since the 1880s. The club has been primarily a hurling club, but it has played Gaelic football also, though with less success. Records indicate that there was a senior football team in Shanballymore in 1894 but all traces of a team was lost up to the 1940s when a team called Brian Boru's was fielded. The club was reformed in 1958 and played with little success until 1980 when we won the Avondhu Junior B double – championship and league,. Two members of that winning side Connor Hannon and Tom Mannix won All-Ireland Minor Football Championship medals with Cork GAA in 1981. In the early 80s Shanballymore fielded a very strong Junior football outfit and were unlucky to lose to Kilshannig three years on the trot by very narrow margins. The football club merged with Doneraile in 1984. In 1985 they were back in B grade against and reached the finals in 1986, 1987, and 1988 – only to lose in all three. The club persevered and in 1989, it won the Junior B Football championship, defeating Kilworth and were upgraded to Junior A ranks for the early 1990s. In 2011 Shanballymore won the Junior B Football championship for the first time in 22 years defeating Grange on a scoreline of 1-03 to 0-10. The hurling history begins in 1902, when the club contested the Cork Senior Hurling Championship final, losing to Dungourney. In 1942 the junior North Cork and County titles were annexed to be followed by the Cork Intermediate Hurling Championship crown in 1943. The 1948 and 1959 County Intermediate finals were to see a reversal of fortunes as they went under to East Cork Sides, Midleton and Carrigtwohill. 1951 Saw Shanballymore getting revenge on Midleton in another Cork Intermediate Hurling Championship final victory. Shanballymore were back in Senior ranks in 1952 and continued there until 1956 – returning to Intermediate up to 1959. The club then went into decline, with the next success being in winning the Junior B (or novice as it then was) in 1965. In 1979 the Under-16 hurlers won divisional and county honours heralding a revival – to be followed in 1981 with the Minor crown – but losing the Under-21 finals to Ballyhea in 1983 and 1984. It took until 1996 for our next hurling success winning the North Cork Junior A Hurling Championship this title was regained in 1997 to win back to back championships. This is the club's last hurling championship success to date in the Junior A grade. However, The Junior B hurling championship of 2016 was a proud year for Shanballymore as they won the Cork Junior B Hurling Championship for the first time and this was further rewarded by winning the All-Ireland Junior B Club Hurling Championship.

== Achievements ==
- All-Ireland Junior B Club Hurling Championship Winner (1) 2016
- Munster Junior B Club Hurling Championship Winner (1) 2016
- Cork Junior B Hurling Championship Winner (1) 2015
- North Cork Junior "B" Hurling Championship - Winner (3) 1969,1983,2015
- North Cork Junior "B" Football Championship - Winner (4) 2011, 2015, 2021, 2021
- North Cork Under-21 "C" Football Championship - Winner (2) 2009, 2011
- North Cork Under-21 "C" Hurling Championship - Winner (1) 2009
- North Cork Junior Hurling Division 2 Hurling League - Winner (1) 2007
- North Cork Junior A Hurling Championship Winner (5) 1931, 1937, 1942, 1996, 1997
- Cork Intermediate Hurling Championship Winner (2) 1943, 1951 Runner-Up 1948, 1950
- Cork Junior Hurling Championship Runner-Up 1902, 1904
- Cork Senior Hurling Championship Runner-Up 1902
- North Cork Div.3 Hurling League Champions (2nd Club Hurling Team) Winner (1) 2017

== Notable players ==
- Tom Mannix (played with Shanballymore from 1981 to 1996) - won a Cork Senior Football Championship with Clonakilty in 1996 (the same year winning a divisional hurling championship with Shanballymore)

== Sources of Information ==
- List of Cork Senior Football Champions
- List of Cork Intermediate Football Champions
- Hogan Stand list of Cork Champions
- Cork GAA results archive page
