= Doneraile GAA =

Gaelic games club in County Cork, Ireland

- CLG Dún ar Aill
- County: Cork
- Colours: Red and Green
- Grounds: Páirc Uí Shíocháin

Playing kits
Standard colours

Doneraile GAA club is a Gaelic Athletic Association club located in Doneraile, County Cork, Ireland. The club fields teams in both hurling and Gaelic football. The club is a member of the Avondhu division of Cork GAA.

== Achievements ==
- Cork Junior B Hurling Championship Winners (1) 2010
- North Cork Junior A Football Championship Winners (2) 1983, 1992 Runners-Up 1993, 1998, 2001
- North Cork Junior A Hurling Championship Winners (2) 1947, 1948 Runners-Up 1949, 1951, 1958

== External sources ==
- Avondhu Divisional website
