= Avondhu GAA =

GAA division in Cork

Avondhu
- Abhainn Dubh
- Founded: 1924
- County: Cork
- Colours

Playing kits
Standard colours

Senior Club Championships
	All Ireland	Munster champions	Cork champions
Football:	0	0	1
Hurling:	0	0	3

Avondhu GAA is a Gaelic Athletic Association division in County Cork, Ireland. The division, one of eight affiliated to the Cork County Board, organises its own junior grade competitions in both hurling and Gaelic football.

== History ==
Located in the northern part of County Cork, Avondhu GAA Division was founded on 31 March 1924. The division derives its name from the literal translation of the River Blackwater, which flows through large parts of the area. Avondhu was one of a number of divisional boards established around that time in an effort to improve the administrative organisation of the GAA in Cork and to provide competitions for the ever-increasing number of clubs, particularly at junior level. Respective competitions in both hurling and Gaelic football were soon organised, with Milford becoming the inaugural winner of the North Cork JHC in 1925 and Fermoy claiming the North Cork JFC in 1926.

Avondhu fielded a hurling team in the Cork SHC for the first time in 1934. The team was composed of players from junior and intermediate clubs in the division and was beaten by Sarsfields in the first round. Avondhu won the Cork SHC title in 1952, following a 3–08 to 4–04 win over St Finbarr's in the final. Further Cork SHC titles were won in 1966 and 1996. Avondhu also won the Cork SFC in 1961, folloiwng a 1–07 to 1–05 defeat of Clonakilty in the final.

Further B-grade and C-grade competitions in both hurling and Gaelic football were created by the Avondhu Board over time. The Avondhu divisional teams' participation in the respective Cork SHC and SFC has been sporadic in recent times.

== Honours ==
- Cork Premier Senior Hurling Championship
  - (gold) Winners (3): 1952, 1966, 1996
  - (silver) Runners-Up (1): 1961
- Cork Premier Senior Football Championship
  - (gold) Winners (1): 1961
  - (silver) Runners-Up (2): 1958, 1960

== Clubs ==
- Abbey Rovers
- Araglen
- Ballyhooly
- Ballyclough
- Ballygiblin
- Ballyhea
- Buttevant
- Castletownroche
- Charleville
- Churchtown (defunct)
- Clyda Rovers
- Deel Rovers
- Dromina
- Doneraile
- Fermoy
- Glanworth
- Grange
- Harbour Rovers
- Kildorrery
- Killavullen
- Kilshannig
- Kilworth
- Liscarroll (defunct)
- Liscarroll Churchtown Gaels
- Mallow
- Milford
- Mitchelstown
- Newtownshandrum
- Shanballymore

== Hurling ==
=== Championship Grades ===
Championship	Club
Senior
Premier Senior	Avondhu
Premier Senior	Charleville
Premier Senior	Newtownshandrum
Senior A	Ballyhea
Intermediate
Premier Intermediate	Fermoy
Premier Intermediate	Kilworth
Intermediate A	Ballygiblin
Intermediate A	Kildorrery
Intermediate A	Kilshannig
Intermediate A	Mallow
Junior
Premier Junior	None
Junior A	Araglen
Junior A	Ballyclough
Junior A	Ballyhooly
Junior A	Buttevant
Junior A	Charleville (2)
Junior A	Clyda Rovers
Junior A	Dromina
Junior A	Fermoy (2)
Junior A	Harbour Rovers
Junior A	Killavullen
Junior A	Liscarroll/Churchtown Gaels
Junior A	Milford
Junior A	Newtownshandrum (2)
Junior A	Shanballymore
Junior B1	Castletownroche
Junior B1	Doneraile
Junior B2	Ballygiblin (2)
Junior B2	Ballyhea (2)
Junior B2	Kildorrery (2)
Junior B2	Kilworth (2)
Junior B2	Liscarroll/Churchtown Gaels (2)
Junior B2	Mallow (2)
Junior C	Buttevant (2)
Junior C	Charleville (3)
Junior C	Clyda Rovers (2)
Junior C	Dromina (2)
Junior C	Fermoy (3)
Junior C	Killavullen (2)
Junior C	Kilshannig (2)
Junior C	Kildorrery (3)
Junior C	Mallow (3)
Junior C	Milford (2)

=== Non-hurling clubs ===
Clubs who do not play hurling at any level are (1)

- Grange

Clubs who do not play hurling but are affiliated sister clubs (4)

- Abbey Rovers (Castletownroche hurling)
- Deel Rovers (Milford hurling)
- Glanworth (Harbour Rovers hurling)
- Mitchelstown (Ballygiblin hurling)

== Football ==
=== Championship Grades ===
Championship	Clubs
Senior
Premier Senior	Avondhu
Premier Senior	Mallow
Senior A	Clyda Rovers
Senior A	Kilshannig
Intermediate
Premier Intermediate	Fermoy
Intermediate A	Buttevant
Intermediate A	Kildorrery
Intermediate A	Mitchelstown
Junior
Premier Junior	Glanworth
Junior A	Ballyclough
Junior A	Ballyhooly
Junior A	Charleville
Junior A	Clyda Rovers (2)
Junior A	Deel Rovers
Junior A	Killavullen
Junior A	Kilshannig (2)
Junior A	Kilworth
Junior A	Liscarroll/Churchtown Gaels
Junior A	Mallow (2)
Junior A	Mitchelstown (2)
Junior B1	Abbey Rovers
Junior B1	Araglen
Junior B1	Ballyhea
Junior B1	Doneraile
Junior B1	Grange
Junior B1	Shanballymore
Junior B2	Ballyclough (2)
Junior B2	Fermoy (2)
Junior B2	Buttevant (2)
Junior B2	Glanworth (2)
Junior B2	Kildorrery (2)
Junior B2	Killavullen (2)
Junior B2	Liscarroll/Churchtown Gaels (2)
Junior B2	Mallow (3)
Junior C	Ballyhea (2)
Junior C	Ballyhooly (2)
Junior C	Buttevant (3)
Junior C	Fermoy (3)
Junior C	Kildorrery (3)
Junior C	Killavullen (3)

=== Non-football clubs ===
Clubs who do not play football at any level are (2)

- Dromina
- Newtownshandrum

Clubs who do not play football but are affiliated sister clubs (4)

- Ballygiblin (Mitchelstown football)
- Castletownroche (Abbey Rovers football)
- Harbour Rovers (Glanworth football)
- Milford (Deel Rovers football)

== Divisional competitions ==
Competition	Year	Champions	Runners-up
Championship
North Cork Junior A Hurling Championship	2026	Dromina	Ballyhooly
North Cork Junior A Football Championship	2026	Charleville	Mallow
North Cork Junior B1 Hurling Championship	2026	Araglen	Doneraile
North Cork Junior B2 Hurling Championship	2026	Newtownshandrum	Kilworth
North Cork Junior B1 Football Championship	2026	Kilworth	Doneraile
North Cork Junior B2 Football Championship	2026	Mitchelstown	Fermoy
North Cork Junior C Hurling Championship	2026		
North Cork Junior C Football Championship	2026		
North Cork U21A Hurling Championship	2023	Newtownshandrum	Charleville
North Cork U21A Football Championship	2022	Clyda Rovers	Mallow
North Cork U21B Football Championship	2022	Killavullen	Mitchelstown
North Cork U21C Football Championship	2022	St Dominics	Ballycastle Gaels
League
North Cork Hurling League Division One	2023	Clyda Rovers	Dromina
North Cork Football League Division One	2023	Ballyhooly	Killavullen
North Cork Hurling League Division Two	2023	Mallow	Araglen
North Cork Football League Division Two	2023	Deel Rovers	Shanballymore
North Cork Hurling League Division Three	2023	Clyda Rovers	Charleville
North Cork Football League Division Three	2023	Buttevant	Mitchelstown

== Notable players ==
- Pat Mulcahy
- Neil Ronan
- Fergal McCormack
- Ray Carey
- Paudie Kissane
