= 2022 Cork Junior A Hurling Championship =

- Dates: 29 October - 4 December 2022
- Teams: 7
- Sponsor: Co-Op Superstores
- Champions: Erin's Own (1st title); James McMahon (captain); Eoghan O'Connor (manager)
- Runners-up: Kilshannig; Bill Curtin (captain); Jim O'Sullivan (manager)

Tournament statistics
- Matches played: 7
- Goals scored: 15 (2.14 per match)
- Points scored: 226 (32.29 per match)

The 2022 Cork Junior A Hurling Championship was the 125th staging of the Cork Junior A Hurling Championship since its establishment by the Cork County Board in 1895. The championship ran from 29 October to 4 December 2022.

The final replay was played on 4 December 2022 at Páirc Uí Rinn in Cork, between Erin's Own and Kilshannig, in what was their first ever meeting in the final. Erin's Own won the match by 1-30 to 3-20 to claim their first ever championship title overall and a first title.

== Qualification ==
Division	Championship	Champions
Avondhu	North Cork Junior A Hurling Championship	Kilshannig
Carbery	South West Junior A Hurling Championship	Ballinascarthy
Carrigdhoun	South East Junior A Hurling Championship	Valley Rovers
Duhallow	Duhallow Junior A Hurling Championship	Dromtarriffe
Imokilly	East Cork Junior A Hurling Championship	Erin's Own
Muskerry	Mid Cork Junior A Hurling Championship	Ballinora
Seandún	City Junior A Hurling Championship	Nemo Rangers

== Divisional Championships ==
=== Duhallow Junior A Hurling Championship ===
Group 1

Pos	Team	Pld	W	D	L	Diff	Pts	Qualification
1	Dromtarriffe	3	3	0	0	+36	6	Advance to Knockout Stage
2	Banteer	3	2	0	1	+3	4	Advance to Knockout Stage
3	Millstreet	2	0	0	2	-5	0	
4	Kanturk	2	0	0	2	-34	0	

Banteer 3-15 - 0-19 Millstreet

Kanturk 3-09 - 3-33 Dromtarriffe

Banteer 5-16 - 2-15 Kanturk

Dromtarriffe 0-26 - 0-14 Banteer

Group 2

Pos	Team	Pld	W	D	L	Diff	Pts	Qualification
1	Kilbrin	2	2	0	0	+10	4	Advance to Knockout Stage
2	Newmarket	2	1	0	1	+18	2	Advance to Knockout Stage
3	Castlemagner	2	0	0	2	-28	0	

Newmarket 3-19 - 0-09 Castlemagner

Newmarket 0-19 - 1-17 Kilbrin

Kilbrin 0-21 - 1-09 Castlemagner

Knockout Stage

Semi-Finals
Dromtarriffe	2-19
Newmarket	2-11
Kilbrin	4-21 AET, 0-16
Banteer	4-21, 0-17

Final
Dromtarriffe	1-26
Banteer	1-13

=== North Cork Junior A Hurling Championship ===
Group A

Pos	Team	Pld	W	D	L	Diff	Pts	Qualification
1	Harbour Rovers	3	3	0	0	+53	6	Advance to Knockout Stage
2	Shanballymore	3	2	0	1	-5	4	Advance to Knockout Stage
3	Araglen	3	1	0	2	-27	2	
4	Fermoy	3	0	0	3	-21	0	

Group B

Pos	Team	Pld	W	D	L	Diff	Pts	Qualification
1	Dromina	2	2	0	0	+14	4	Advance to Knockout Stage
2	Kilshannig	2	1	0	1	-3	2	Advance to Knockout Stage
3	Buttevant	2	0	0	2	-11	0	

Group C

Pos	Team	Pld	W	D	L	Diff	Pts	Qualification
1	Killavullen	2	2	0	0	+20	4	Advance to Knockout Stage
2	Clyda Rovers	2	1	0	1	+15	2	Advance to Knockout Stage
3	Castletownroche	2	0	0	2	-35	0	

Group D

Pos	Team	Pld	W	D	L	Diff	Pts	Qualification
1	Liscarroll Churchtown Gaels	2	2	0	0	+6	4	Advance to Knockout Stage
2	Ballyhooly	2	1	0	1	+6	2	Advance to Knockout Stage
3	Charleville	2	0	0	2	-12	0	

Knockout Stage

Quarter-Finals
Clyda Rovers	1-18
Liscarroll Churchtown Gaels	1-19
Shanballymore	1-14
Dromina	0-15
Kilshannig	2-20
Harbour Rovers	0-14
Killavullen	1-16
Ballyhooly	0-13

Semi-Finals
Liscarroll Churchtown Gaels	0-18
Shanballymore	0-14
Kilshannig	0-16
Killavullen	1-08

Final
Liscarroll Churchtown Gaels	1-10
Kilshannig	1-14

=== Mid Cork Junior A Hurling Championship ===
Group 1

Pos	Team	Pld	W	D	L	Diff	Pts	Qualification
1	Blarney	2	2	0	0	+16	4	Advance to Knockout Stage
2	Inniscarra	2	1	0	1	+0	2	Advance to Knockout Stage
3	Donoughmore	2	0	0	2	-16	0	

Group 2

Pos	Team	Pld	W	D	L	Diff	Pts	Qualification
1	Grenagh	3	3	0	0	+45	6	Advance to Knockout Stage
2	Kilmichael	3	1	1	1	+5	3	Advance to Knockout Stage
3	Cloughduv	3	1	0	2	-34	2	
4	Aghabullogue	3	0	1	2	-16	1	

Group 3

Pos	Team	Pld	W	D	L	Diff	Pts	Qualification
1	Ballinora	3	3	0	0	+42	6	Advance to Knockout Stage
2	Eire Og	3	2	0	1	-1	4	Advance to Knockout Stage
3	Ballincollig	3	1	0	2	-24	2	
4	Iveleary	3	0	0	3	-17	0	

Knockout stage

Quarter-Finals
Eire Og	1-15
Blarney	2-10
Inniscarra	1-20
Kilmichael	0-14

Semi-Finals
Grenagh	1-16
Eire Og	1-11
Ballinora	4-14
Inniscarra	2-09

Final
Grenagh	0-11
Ballinora	0-16

=== South West Junior A Hurling Championship ===
Group 1

Pos	Team	Pld	W	D	L	Diff	Pts	Qualification
1	Ballinascarthy	3	3	0	0	+36	6	Advance to Knockout Stage
2	Dohenys	3	2	0	1	+23	4	Advance to Knockout Stage
3	St Colum's	3	1	0	2	-17	2	
4	St Oliver Plunkett's	3	0	0	3	-42	0	

Group 2

Pos	Team	Pld	W	D	L	Diff	Pts	Qualification
1	Clonakilty	3	3	0	0	+22	6	Advance to Knockout Stage
2	St James	3	2	0	1	+3	4	Advance to Knockout Stage
3	Kilbree	3	1	0	2	-4	2	
4	Diarmuid Ó Mathúna's	3	0	0	3	-21	0	

Group 3

Pos	Team	Pld	W	D	L	Diff	Pts	Qualification
1	Newcestown	3	3	0	0	+33	6	Advance to Knockout Stage
2	St Mary's	3	1	1	1	+21	3	Advance to Knockout Stage
3	Kilbrittain	3	1	0	2	-36	2	
4	Bandon	3	0	1	2	-18	1	

Knockout Stage

Quarter-Finals
Dohenys	0-13
St James	0-12
Clonakilty	2-19
St Mary's	1-06

Semi-Finals
Ballinascarthy	1-22p
Dohenys	1-22
Newcestown	1-11
Clonakilty	1-09

Final
Ballinascarthy	1-25
Newcestown	1-11

=== City Junior A Hurling Championship ===
First Round; Second Round
Glen Rovers	0-18
Whites Cross	0-12
Nemo Rangers	1-18
Bishopstown	1-05
Bishopstown	0-12
Whites Cross	0-06
Na Piarsaigh	1-12
Whitechurch	2-23
St Finbarrs	0-18
St Vincents	2-33
Brian Dillons	3-22
Blackrock	1-08
Blackrock	2-11
Passage	3-25
Na Piarsaigh	4-22
St Finbarrs	1-11

Quarter-finals
Glen Rovers	0-17
Nemo Rangers	3-15
Bishopstown	1-12
Whitechurch	2-22
St Vincents	0-13
Brian Dillons	1-22
Passage	2-18
Na Piarsaigh	0-06

Semi-finals
Nemo Rangers	1-14
Whitechurch	2-06
Brian Dillons	2-23
Passage	4-08

Final
Nemo Rangers	0-13
Brian Dillons	1-06

First Round

Na Piarsaigh 1-12 - 2-23 Whitechurch

Nemo Rangers 1-18 - 1-05 Bishopstown

St Finbarrs 0-18 - 2-33 St Vincents

Glen Rovers 0-18 - 0-12 Whites Cross

Blackrock 2-11 - 3-25 Passage

Second Round

Brian Dillons 3-22 - 1-08 Blackrock

Na Piarsaigh 4-22 - 1-11 St Finbarrs

Bishopstown 0-12 - 0-06 Whites Cross

Quarter-Finals

Glen Rovers 0-17 - 3-15 Nemo Rangers

Bishopstown 1-12 - 2-22 Whitechurch

St Vincents 0-13 - 1-22 Brian Dillons

Passage 2-18 - 0-06 Na Piarsaigh

Semi-Finals

Passage 4-08 - 2-23 Brian Dillons

Whitechurch 2-06 - 1-14 Nemo Rangers

Final

Brian Dillons 1-06 - 0-13 Nemo Rangers

=== South East Junior A Hurling Championship ===
Group 1

Pos	Team	Pld	W	D	L	Diff	Pts	Qualification
1	Ballymartle	2	2	0	0	+16	4	Advance to Knockout Stage
2	Valley Rovers	2	1	0	1	+4	2	Advance to Knockout Stage
3	Kinsale	2	0	0	2	-20	0	

Group 2

Pos	Team	Pld	W	D	L	Diff	Pts	Qualification
1	Ballinhassig	2	2	0	0	+10	4	Advance to Knockout Stage
2	Belgooly	2	1	0	1	+9	2	Advance to Knockout Stage
3	Courcey Rovers	2	0	0	2	-19	0	

Group 3

Pos	Team	Pld	W	D	L	Diff	Pts	Qualification
1	Shamrocks	2	2	0	0	+15	4	Advance to Knockout Stage
2	Ballygarvan	2	1	0	1	+4	2	Advance to Knockout Stage
3	Carrigaline	2	0	0	2	-19	0	

Knockout Stage

Quarter-Finals
Valley Rovers	1-21
Ballinhassig	1-15
Belgooly
Ballygarvan	1-14

Semi-Finals
Shamrocks	3-08
Valley Rovers	0-20
Ballymartle	2-18
Belgooly	0-16

Final
Valley Rovers	0-16
Ballymartle	0-14

=== East Cork Junior A Football Championship ===
Group A

Pos	Team	Pld	W	D	L	Diff	Pts	Qualification
1	Erin's Own	4	3	1	0	+57	7	Advance to Knockout Stage
2	Carrignavar	4	2	2	0	+25	6	Advance to Knockout Stage
3	Killeagh	4	2	0	2	-12	4	Advance to Knockout Stage
4	Fr. O'Neill's	4	1	1	2	-5	3	
5	Watergrasshill	4	0	0	4	-65	0	Advance to Relegation Playoff

Group B

Pos	Team	Pld	W	D	L	Diff	Pts	Qualification
1	Cobh	4	3	1	0	+14	7	Advance to Knockout Stage
2	St. Ita's	4	3	0	1	+29	6	Advance to Knockout Stage
3	Midleton	4	2	1	1	+4	5	Advance to Knockout Stage
4	Sarsfields	4	1	0	3	-27	2	
5	Carrigtwohill	4	0	0	4	-20	0	Advance to Relegation Playoff

Knockout Stage

Quarter-Finals
St. Ita's	1-20
Killeagh	0-20
Carrignavar	1-16
Midleton	1-20

Semi-Finals
Erin's Own	4-16
St. Ita's	2-19
Cobh	0-16
Midleton	0-09

Final
Erin's Own	4-12
Cobh	2-09

Relegation Playoff

Watergrasshill 3-11 - 2-22 Carrigtwohill

== Fixtures and results ==
=== Bracket ===
Quarter-Finals
Erin's Own (Imokilly)	1-14
Nemo Rangers (Seandun)	0-10
Kilshannig (Avondhu)	1-19
Dromtarriffe (Duhallow)	1-16
Ballinascarthy (Carbery)	2-17
Valley Rovers (Carrigdhoun)	1-15

Semi-Finals
Ballinora (Muskerry)	3-09
Erin's Own (Imokilly)	1-20
Kilshannig (Avondhu)	0-15
Ballinascarthy (Carbery)	1-09

Final
Erin's Own (Imokilly)	0-16, 1-30 aet
Kilshannig (Avondhu)	0-16, 3-20

=== Quarter-finals ===
29 October 2022 Quarter-final	Kilshannig	1-19 - 1-16	Dromtarriffe	Dr. Mannix Sportsfield
	J Twomey 0-6, P Walsh 1-1, K Twomey 0-4, K O'Hanlon 0-3, D Twomey 0-2, E Burke 0-1, C O'Shea 0-1, É O'Hanlon 0-1.		T Howard 1-6, S Coyne 0-3, B Murphy 0-3, E Murphy 0-1, D O'Connor 0-1, S Howard 0-1, K Cremin 0-1.	Referee: B Murphy (Carrigtwohill)

29 October 2022 Quarter-final	Ballinascarthy	2-17 - 1-15	Valley Rovers	Charlie Hurley Park
	B Murray 1-4, J Ryan 0-6, B O'Donovan 1-2, Cillian Cullinane 0-2, Conall Cullinane 0-1, L Murray 0-1, R O'Flynn 0-1.		RS Sweetnam 0-9, C Taheny 1-0, C Kilduff 0-2, D Looney 0-1, S Kiely 0-1, C McCarthy 0-1, D Crowley 0-1.	Referee: D Kirwan (Éire Óg)

6 November 2022 Quarter-final	Erin's Own	1-14 - 0-10	Nemo Rangers	Erin's Own Grounds

- Ballinora received a bye in this round.

=== Semi-finals ===
13 November 2022 Semi-final	Ballinora	3-09 - 1-20	Erin's Own	Ovens Grounds

13 November 2022 Semi-final	Kilshannig	0-15 - 1-09	Ballinascarthy	Páirc Uí Riagáin
	É O'Hanlon 0-4, J Twomey 0-4 (1f), K Twomey 0-3 (2f), K O'Hanlon 0-2, B Curtin 0-2.

=== Final ===
20 November 2022 Final	Erin's Own	0-16 - 0-16	Kilshannig	Páirc Uí Chaoimh
	M Collins 0-9 (0-8f), S Murphy 0-2, G O’Mahony 0-1, C O’Callaghan 0-1, A O’Sullivan 0-1, T Foley 0-1, I O’Mahony 0-1.	Report	J Twomey 0-6 (0-4f), K O’Hanlon 0-3, P Walsh 0-3, E Bourke 0-1, K Twomey 0-1f, E O’Hanlon 0-1, Darragh O’Sullivan 0-1.	Referee: D Carroll (Kanturk)

4 December 2022 Final replay	Erin's Own	1-30 - 3-20 (aet)	Kilshannig	Páirc Uí Rinn
	M Collins 0-19 (0-16 f), S Murphy 1-3, C O’Callaghan 0-3, A O’Sullivan 0-2, G O’Mahony, A Power, T Foley 0-1 each.	Report	J Twomey 2-7 (0-4 f), D Murphy 1-3, E O’Hanlon 0-3, K Twomey 0-2 f, J Kearney, K O’Hanlon 0-2 each, Diarmuid O’Sullivan 0-1.	Referee: I McCarthy (Bandon)
