= 2023 Cork Junior A Hurling Championship =

- Dates: 4–26 November 2023
- Teams: 7
- Sponsor: Co-Op Superstores
- Champions: Nemo Rangers (2nd title); Barry Cripps (captain); Seán Hayes (manager)
- Runners-up: Harbour Rovers; Eric O'Donoghue (captain); Dennis Healy (manager)

Tournament statistics
- Matches played: 6
- Goals scored: 16 (2.67 per match)
- Points scored: 182 (30.33 per match)
- Top scorer(s): Shane Horgan (1-30)

The 2023 Cork Junior A Hurling Championship was the 126th staging of the Cork Junior A Hurling Championship since its establishment by the Cork County Board in 1895. The championship ran from 4 November to 26 November 2023.

The final was played on 26 November 2023 at Páirc Uí Rinn in Cork, between Nemo Rangers and Harbour Rovers, in what was their first ever meeting in the final. Nemo Rangers won the match by 1-14 to 1-12 to claim their second championship title overall and a first title in 23 years.

Shane Horgan was the championship's top scorer with 1-30.

== Qualification ==
Division	Championship	Champions	#
Avondhu	2023 North Cork Junior A Hurling Championship	Harbour Rovers	
Carbery	2023 Carbery Junior A Hurling Championship	Clonakilty	
Carrigdhoun	South East Junior A Hurling Championship	Belgooly	
Duhallow	Duhallow Junior A Hurling Championship	Newmarket	
Imokilly	2023 East Cork Junior A Hurling Championship	Carrignavar	
Muskerry	2023 Mid Cork Junior A Hurling Championship	Ballinora	
Seandún	City Junior A Hurling Championship	Nemo Rangers	

== Divisional championships ==
=== Duhallow Junior A Hurling Championship ===
Group A

Pos	Team	Pld	W	D	L	Diff	Pts	Qualification
1	Millstreet	3	2	1	0	+12	5	Advance to Knockout Stage
2	Kilbrin	3	2	0	1	+8	4	Advance to Knockout Stage
3	Freemount	3	1	0	2	-13	2	
4	Banteer	3	0	1	2	-7	1	

Banteer 0-13 - 1-11 Freemount

Millstreet 1-17 - 2-12 Kilbrin

Kilbrin 0-16 - 0-12 Freemount

Millstreet 0-17 - 2-11 Banteer

Freemount 1-11 - 0-24 Millstreet

Banteer 1-12 - 1-18 Kilbrin

Group B

Pos	Team	Pld	W	D	L	Diff	Pts	Qualification
1	Newmarket	3	2	1	0	+43	5	Advance to Knockout Stage
2	Dromtarriffe	3	2	1	0	+15	5	Advance to Knockout Stage
3	Castlemagner	3	1	0	2	-26	2	
4	Kanturk	3	0	0	3	-32	0	

Newmarket 3-16 - 1-22 Dromtarricfe

Castlemagner 2-16 - 0-16 Kanturk

Kanturk 0-12 - 4-26 Newmarket

Dromtarriffe 3-23 - 1-14 Castlemagner

Dromtarriffe w/o - scr. Kanturk

Castlemagner 1-13 - 2-27 Newmarket

Knockout stage

Semi-Finals
Newmarket	1-30 aet
Kilbrin	1-22
Millstreet	1-13
Dromtarriffe	3-18

Final
Dromtarriffe	2-13
Newmarket	4-14

=== North Cork Junior A Hurling Championship ===
Group A

Pos	Team	Pld	W	D	L	Diff	Pts	Qualification
1	Kilshannig	3	3	0	0	+27	6	Advance to Knockout Stage
2	Killavullen	3	2	0	1	+8	4	Advance to Knockout Stage
3	Dromina	3	1	0	2	-8	2	
4	Charleville	3	0	0	3	-27	0	

Group B

Pos	Team	Pld	W	D	L	Diff	Pts	Qualification
1	Liscarroll Churchtown Gaels	3	3	0	0	+32	6	Advance to Knockout Stage
2	Clyda Rovers	3	2	0	1	+24	4	Advance to Knockout Stage
3	Ballyhea	3	1	0	2	-21	2	
4	Buttevant	3	0	0	3	-35	0	

Group C

Pos	Team	Pld	W	D	L	Diff	Pts	Qualification
1	Harbour Rovers	3	2	1	0	+39	5	Advance to Knockout Stage
2	Ballyhooly	3	2	0	1	+13	4	Advance to Knockout Stage
3	Shanballymore	3	1	1	1	-10	3	
4	Araglen	3	0	0	3	-42	0	

Knockout stage

Quarter-Finals
Clyda Rovers	2-17
Ballyhooly	3-15
Harbour Rovers	0-17
Killavullen	0-11

Semi-Finals
Kilshannig	3-16
Ballyhooly	4-09
Liscarroll Churchtown Gaels	0-14
Harbour Rovers	2-17

Final
Kilshannig	0-16
Harbour Rovers	1-16

=== Mid Cork Junior A Hurling Championship ===
Group 1

Pos	Team	Pld	W	D	L	Diff	Pts	Qualification
1	Ballinora	3	3	0	0	+48	6	Advance to Knockout Stage
2	Kilmichael	3	2	0	1	-5	4	Advance to Knockout Stage
3	Ballincollig	3	1	0	2	-24	2	
4	Inniscarra	3	0	0	3	-19	0	

Group 2

Pos	Team	Pld	W	D	L	Diff	Pts	Qualification
1	Dripsey	2	2	0	0	+28	4	Advance to Knockout Stage
2	Blarney	2	1	0	1	-8	2	Advance to Knockout Stage
3	Cloughduv	2	0	0	2	-20	0	

Group 3

Pos	Team	Pld	W	D	L	Diff	Pts	Qualification
1	Grenagh	2	1	1	0	+16	3	Advance to Knockout Stage
3	Éire Óg	2	1	0	1	-15	2	Advance to Knockout Stage
2	Donoughmore	2	0	1	1	-1	1	

Knockout stage

Quarter-Finals
Grenagh	1-18
Blarney	1-08
Kilmichael	1-20
Éire Óg	0-12

Semi-Finals
Ballinora	1-21
Grenagh	2-15
Dripsey	2-19
Kilmichael	1-16

Final
Ballinora	0-15
Dripsey	1-09

=== City Junior A Hurling Championship ===
Bracket

First Round; Second Round
Passage West	0-15
Nemo Rangers	1-19
White's Cross	0-16
St Finbarr's	0-15
Nemo Rangers	1-12
St Vincent's	2-12
Glen Rovers	0-19
Bishopstown	1-19
Blackrock	0-14
Na Piarsaigh	3-13
Blackrock	5-11
Glen Rovers	4-17
Whitechurch	3-20
Brian Dillons	2-15
Passage West	1-20
Brian Dillons	2-08

Quarter-finals
Nemo Rangers	0-17
White's Cross	0-13
St Vincent's	1-18
Bishopstown	1-15
Na Piarsaigh	0-13
Glen Rovers	0-20
Whitechurch	2-27
Passage West	1-11

Semi-finals
Nemo Rangers	1-15
St Vincent's	0-12
Glen Rovers	2-14
Whitechurch	1-20

Final
Nemo Rangers	3-17
Whitechurch	1-10

=== South West Junior A Hurling Championship ===
Group 1

Pos	Team	Pld	W	D	L	Diff	Pts	Qualification
1	Kilbree	3	3	0	0	+16	6	Advance to Knockout Stage
2	Clonakilty	3	2	0	1	+19	4	Advance to Knockout Stage
3	Dohenys	3	1	0	2	-14	2	
4	St Colum's	3	0	0	3	-21	0	

Group 2

Pos	Team	Pld	W	D	L	Diff	Pts	Qualification
1	Ballinascarthy	2	2	0	0	+6	4	Advance to Knockout Stage
2	St James	2	1	0	1	-1	2	Advance to Knockout Stage
3	Bandon	2	0	0	2	-5	0	

Group 3

Pos	Team	Pld	W	D	L	Diff	Pts	Qualification
1	Diarmuid Ó Mathúna's	3	2	0	1	-2	4	Advance to Knockout Stage
2	Newcestown	3	2	0	1	+9	4	Advance to Knockout Stage
3	Randal Óg	3	1	0	1	-2	2	
4	St Mary's	3	1	0	2	-5	2	

Knockout stage

Quarter-Finals
Diarmuid Ó Mathúna's	2-16
St James	1-19p
Clonakilty	1-16
Newcestown	0-14

Semi-Finals
Kilbree	1-09
St James	1-19
Ballinascarthy	2-22
Clonakilty	3-20 AET

Final
St James	0-11
Clonakilty	1-17

=== South East Junior A Hurling Championship ===
Group 1

Pos	Team	Pld	W	D	L	Diff	Pts	Qualification
1	Ballymartle	2	2	0	0	+26	4	Advance to Knockout Stage
2	Kinsale	2	1	0	1	+3	2	Advance to Knockout Stage
3	Carrigaline	2	0	0	2	-29	0	

Group 2

Pos	Team	Pld	W	D	L	Diff	Pts	Qualification
1	Valley Rovers	2	2	0	0	+27	4	Advance to Knockout Stage
2	Ballinhassig	2	1	0	1	+20	2	Advance to Knockout Stage
3	Courcey Rovers	2	0	0	2	-47	0	

Group 3

Pos	Team	Pld	W	D	L	Diff	Pts	Qualification
1	Belgooly	2	2	0	0	+30	4	Advance to Knockout Stage
2	Shamrocks	2	1	0	1	-12	2	Advance to Knockout Stage
3	Ballygarvan	2	0	0	2	-18	0	

Knockout Stage

Quarter-Finals
Ballinhassig	4-13
Kinsale	1-19
Ballymartle	1-14
Shamrocks	0-07

Semi-Finals
Belgooly	0-24
Ballinhassig	2-13
Valley Rovers	0-21
Ballymartle	2-12

Final
Belgooly	5-17
Valley Rovers	2-14

=== East Cork Junior A Hurling Championship ===
Group A

Pos	Team	Pld	W	D	L	Diff	Pts	Qualification
1	Cobh	2	2	0	0	+6	4	Advance to Knockout Stage
2	Killeagh	2	1	0	1	+10	2	Advance to Knockout Stage
3	Fr. O'Neill's	2	0	0	2	-16	0	Relegated

Group B

Pos	Team	Pld	W	D	L	Diff	Pts	Qualification
1	Carrignavar	2	2	0	0	+5	4	Advance to Knockout Stage
2	Carrigtwohill	2	1	0	1	+4	2	Advance to Knockout Stage
3	Midleton	2	0	0	2	-9	0	Advance to relegation playoff

Group C

Pos	Team	Pld	W	D	L	Diff	Pts	Qualification
1	St. Ita's	2	1	1	0	+4	3	Advance to Knockout Stage
2	Bride Rovers	2	1	0	1	0	2	Advance to Knockout Stage
3	Sarsfields	2	0	1	1	-4	1	Advance to relegation playoff

Knockout stage

Quarter-Finals
Killeagh	2-17
Bride Rovers	1-17
St Ita's	5-12
Carrigtwohill	2-09

Semi-Finals
Carrignavar	1-23
Killeagh	1-12
Cobh	0-12
St Ita's	2-12

Final
Carrignavar	0-18
St Ita's	1-14

Relegation playoff

Sarsfields 2-18 - 2-20 Midleton

Fr. O'Neill's and Sarsfields are relegated

== County championship ==
=== Bracket ===
Quarter-Finals
Harbour Rovers (Avondhu)	1-15
Newmarket (Duhallow)	0-14
Nemo Rangers (Seandun)	3-21
Belgooly (Carrigdhoun)	4-12
Clonakilty (Carbery)	0-11
Ballinora (Muskerry)	1-23

Semi-Finals
Harbour Rovers (Avondhu)	1-19
Carrignavar (Imokilly)	1-15
Nemo Rangers (Seandun)	2-12
Ballinora (Muskerry)	1-14

Final
Harbour Rovers (Avondhu)	1-12
Nemo Rangers (Seandun)	1-14

=== Quarter-finals ===
4 November 2023 Quarter-final	Harbour Rovers	1-15 - 0-14	Newmarket	O'Connell Park
	S Condon 0-9 (0-6 f), D O'Brien 1-3, D Pyne 0-2, T McGrath 0-1.	Report	D Hannon 0-8 f, H O’Connor 0-2, K O’Sullivan, C O’Keeffe, B O’Connor, R Lynn 0-1 each.	Referee: W Wallis (Aghada)

4 November 2023 Quarter-final	Nemo Rangers	3-21 - 4-12	Belgooly	Páirc Uí Rinn
	S Horgan 1-12 (1-7 f, 0-2 65); R Dalton, P Collins 1-1 each; A Petrov, B Cripps 0-2 each; G Barrett 0-1 65; C Horgan, E Dilloughrey 0-1 each.	Report	R Long 2-0; C O’Donovan 1-2; K Fitzgerald 1-1 (1-0 sl); B Dwyer 0-5 f; E O’Donovan 0-3f; S Kiely 0-1.	Referee: A O'Regan (Kilbrittain)

5 November 2023 Quarter-final	Clonakilty	0-11 - 1-23	Ballinora	Páirc Uí Chaoimh
	E Ryan 0-4 f, M White 0-3, D Lowney 0-2, B White, C Kenneally 0-1 each.	Report	A O’Shea 1-2, S Kingston (0-3 f), J Byrne 0-5 each, N Lordan, T Burns 0-3 each, C Quirke 0-2, M Lordan, A O’Sullivan, J Twohig 0-1 each.	Referee: E Coleman (Youghal)

- Carrignavar received a bye in this round.

=== Semi-finals ===
11 November 2023 Semi-final	Nemo Rangers	2-12 - 1-14	Ballinora	Páirc Uí Rinn
	S Horgan 0-8 (0-7 f), R Dalton 1-2, J Horgan 1-0, C Kiely, A Petrovs 0-1 each.	Report	S Kingston 0-7 (0-5 f), D Corkery 1-1, A O’Shea, J Byrne 0-2 each, N Lordan, T Burns 0-1 each.	Referee: P Beausang (Midleton)

11 November 2023 Semi-final	Carrignavar	1-15 - 1-19	Harbour Rovers	Páirc Uí Rinn
	J Forde 0-9 (0-7 f), B Connolly 1-0, T Geaney, P Sheehan 0-2 each, J Forde, O Crowley 0-1 each.	Report	S Condon 0-10 (0-5 f), D Pyne 1-0, D O’Brien 0-3, J O’Sullivan 0-2, T Condon, T McGrath, E Sheehan, P Hannon 0-1 each.	Referee: N Fahy (Brian Dillons)

=== Final ===
26 November 2023 Final	Nemo Rangers	1-14 - 1-12	Harbour Rovers	Páirc Uí Rinn
	S Horgan 0-10 (0-8 f), A O’Donovan 1-0, C Kiely 0-2, M Cronin, K O’Donovan 0-1 each.	Report	S Condon 0-9 (0-5 f, 0-1 ‘65’), D O’Brien 1-1, T McGrath, J O’Sullivan 0-1 each.	Referee: B Sweeney (Erin's Own)

== Championship statistics ==
=== Top scorers ===
Rank	Player	County	Tally	Total	Matches	Average
1	Shane Horgan	Nemo Rangers	1-30	33	3	11.00
2	Stephen Condon	Harbour Rovers	0-28	28	3	9.33
3	Darragh O'Brien	Harbour Rovers	2-07	13	3	4.33
4	Shane Kingston	Ballinora	0-12	12	2	6.00
5	Ronan Dalton	Nemo Rangers	2-03	9	3	3.00
5	James Forde	Carrignavar	0-09	9	1	9.00
7	Donal Hannon	Newmarket	0-08	8	1	8.00
8	Alan O'Shea	Ballinora	1-04	7	2	3.50
8	James Byrne	Ballinora	0-07	7	2	3.50
10	Ryan Long	Belgooly	2-00	6	1	6.00
