= 2024 Carbery Junior A Hurling Championship =

Annual Hurling competition season

- Dates: 3 August - 3 November 2024
- Teams: 13
- Sponsor: RCM Tarmacadam
- Champions: Diarmuid Ó Mathúna's (6th title)
- Runners-up: Ballinascarthy
- Relegated: Bandon; Bantry Blues

Tournament statistics
- Matches played: 23
- Goals scored: 52 (2.26 per match)
- Points scored: 708 (30.78 per match)
- Top scorer(s): James O'Driscoll (3-42)

The 2024 Carbery Junior A Hurling Championship was the 100th staging of the Carbery Junior A Hurling Championship since its establishment by the West Cork Board in 1925. The draw for the group stage placings took place on 20 February 2024. The championship ran from 3 August to 3 November 2024.

Clonakilty were the defending champions, however, they were beaten by St James' in the quarter-finals. Bandon and Bantry Blues were relegated after losing in the playoffs.

== Team changes ==
=== To Championship ===
Promoted from the Carbery Junior B Hurling Championship

- Bantry Blues
- Oliver Plunketts

== Group 1 ==
=== Group 1 table ===
Knockout stage

Team	Matches				Score			Pts
Team	Pld	W	D	L	For	Against	Diff	Pts
Ballinascarthy	2	2	0	0	61	29	32	4
Newcestown	2	1	0	1	39	29	10	2
Bandon	2	0	0	2	25	67	-42	0

=== Group 1 results ===
3 August 2024 Round 1	Ballinascarthy	1-14 - 0-16	Newcestown	Charlie Hurley Park
	J Ryan 0-7, B O'Donovan 1-2, T Cullinane 0-2, C Cullinane 0-2, S Ryan 0-1.		E Kelly 0-11, O Walsh 0-2, C Clarke 0-1, A Shorten 0-1, C Hurley 0-1.

23 August 2024 Round 2	Ballinascarthy	6-26 - 2-07	Bandon	Kilbrittain Grounds
	B O'Donovan 1-7, J Ryan 0-7, E O'Brien 2-0, T Cullinane 0-4, C Cullinane 1-0, D Nyhan 1-0, C Ryan 1-0, S Ryan 0-3, T Walsh 0-2, L Murray 0-2, P Cullinane 0-1.		J Lillis 1-2, P Barry 1-2, P Hartnett 0-1, R Fogarty 0-1, S Murphy 0-1.

6 September 2024 Round 3	Newcestown	2-17 - 0-12	Bandon	St Mary's Park
	E Kelly 0-10, O O'Sullivan 2-1, C Hurley 0-3, P Collins 0-2, C Goggin 0-1.		P Barry 0-8, S Murphy 0-2, E Geary 0-1, K Hannon 0-1.

== Group 2 ==
=== Group 2 table ===
Knockout stage

Team	Matches				Score			Pts
Team	Pld	W	D	L	For	Against	Diff	Pts
St James'	2	1	1	0	49	22	27	3
St Mary's	2	1	1	0	37	21	16	3
Bantry Blues	2	0	0	2	17	60	-43	0

=== Group 2 results ===
4 August 2024 Round 1	St James'	0-13 - 1-10	St Mary's	Ballinacarriga Grounds
	J O'Driscoll 0-8, C Hayes 0-3, J O'Sullivan 0-1, P O'Sullivan 0-1.		D O'Donovan 1-3, J Collins 0-2, O Corcoran 0-1, M O'Driscoll 0-1, B McCarthy 0-1, A O'Driscoll 0-1, N Kelleher 0-1.

24 August 2024 Round 2	St Mary's	1-21 - 0-08	Bantry Blues	Sam Maguire Park
	J Collins 0-7, M O'Driscoll 1-2, D O'Donovan 0-5, O Corcoran 0-2, A O'Driscoll 0-2, B McCarthy 0-1, P McNamara 0-1, N Kelleher 0-1.		S Keevers 0-3, D McCarthy 0-2, S Cronin 0-2, R O'Mahony 0-1.

8 September 2024 Round 3	St James'	3-27 - 1-06	Bantry Blues	Sam Maguire Park
	J O'Driscoll 1-14, M Evans 2-5, Conor Hayes 0-3, Criostóir Hayes 0-3, A Whelton 0-1, J O'Sullivan 0-1.

== Group 3 ==
=== Group 3 table ===
Knockout stage

Team	Matches				Score			Pts
Team	Pld	W	D	L	For	Against	Diff	Pts
Diarmuid Ó Mathúna's	2	2	0	0	52	30	22	4
Clonakilty	2	1	0	1	35	45	-10	2
St Oliver Plunketts	2	0	0	2	35	47	-12	0

=== Group 3 results ===
3 August 2024 Round 1	Clonakilty	0-23 - 1-14	St Oliver Plunketts	St Mary's Park
	B White 0-9, S White 0-5, M White 0-3, D Lowney 0-3, F Murphy 0-2, C Coakley 0-1.		D McCarthy 0-5, R O'Driscoll 1-1, C McCarthy 0-3, M Keohane 0-2, N O'Driscoll 0-2, C Lyons 0-1.

25 August 2024 Round 2	Clonakilty	0-12 - 2-22	Diarmuid Ó Mathúna's	St Mary's Park
	B White 0-7, N Barrett 0-2, F Murphy 0-1, S White 0-1, M White 0-1.		C O'Donovan 1-6, G O'Donovan 0-6, J Lucey 0-4, K O'Donovan 1-0, C O'Sullivan 0-2, J Hurley 0-1, S Crowley 0-1, J Fleming 0-1, P Crowley 0-1.

7 September 2024 Round 3	St Oliver Plunketts	2-12 - 2-18	Diarmuid Ó Mathúna's	Páirc Naomh Eoin
	MP Keohane 1-2, Conor McCarthy 1-1, D McCarthy 0-4, Cian McCarthy 0-3, M Collins 0-1, P Healy 0-1.		J Lucey 1-10, C O'Donovan 0-4, K O'Donovan 1-0, J Fleming 0-1, P Crowley 0-1, T Lordan 0-1, C O'Sullivan 0-1.

== Group 4 ==
=== Group 4 table ===
Knockout stage

Team	Matches				Score			Pts
Team	Pld	W	D	L	For	Against	Diff	Pts
Kilbree	3	3	0	0	71	40	31	6
Randal Óg	3	1	0	2	61	58	3	2
Dohenys	3	1	0	2	51	56	-5	2
St Colum's	3	1	0	2	36	65	-29	2

=== Group 4 results ===
3 August 2024 Round 1	Dohenys	1-14 - 2-12	St Colum's	Wolfe Tone Park

3 August 2024 Round 1	Randal Óg	1-17 - 1-23	Kilbree	St James' Park

24 August 2024 Round 2	Kilbree	1-22 - 0-07	St Colum's	Castletown Grounds
	J Shanahan 0-12, E Shanahan 0-6, D McCarthy 1-2, B Deasy 0-2.		S Murnane 0-5, E O'Sullivan 0-2.

25 August 2024 Round 2	Randal Óg	2-12 - 0-21	Dohenys	Rossmore Grounds

7 September 2024 Round 3	Kilbree	1-17 - 0-13	Dohenys	Ahamilla Grounds
	D Coakley 0-9, J O'Donovan 1-1, C Twohig 0-2, E Shanahan 0-2, MD Keohane 0-1, D McCarthy 0-1, O O'Sullivan 0-1.		B Murphy 0-9, F Herlihy 0-3, A O'Donovan 0-1.

7 September 2024 Round 3	Randal Óg	2-17 - 0-11	St Colum's	Ballydehob Grounds

== Knockout stage ==
=== Relegation playoffs ===
21 September 2024 Playoff	St Colum's	w/o - scr.	Bantry Blues	Sam Maguire Park

22 September 2024 Playoff	St Oliver Plunketts	1-25 - 1-12	Bandon	Kilbrittain Grounds

=== Quarter-finals ===
21 September 2024 Quarter-final	Diarmuid Ó Mathúna's	1-14 - 1-11	St Mary's	Rossmore Grounds
	G O'Donovan 1-1, J Lucey 0-4, K O'Donovan 0-3, C O'Donovan 0-3, T Lordan 0-1, C O'Sullivan 0-1, M O'Driscoll 0-1.	Report	O Corcoran 1-2, D O'Donovan 0-3, J Collins 0-3, N Kelleher 0-1, Mark O'Driscoll 0-1, Michael O'Driscoll 0-1.

22 September 2024 Quarter-final	Ballinascarthy	5-19 - 2-15	Randal Óg	Sam Maguire Park
	J Ryan 1-13, B O'Donovan 3-1, S Ryan 0-4, T Cullinane 1-0, L Murray 0-1.	Report	S Crowley 0-12, C Duggan 2-0, C O'Connell 0-1, P O'Sullivan 0-1, D Collins 0-1.

22 September 2024 Quarter-final	St James'	2-15 - 0-18	Clonakilty	Timoleague Grounds
	J O'Driscoll 2-10, P Whelton 0-2, I Evans 0-1, C Hennessy 0-1, J O'Sullivan 0-1.	Report	B White 0-10, C O'Donovan 0-2, M White 0-2, F Murphy 0-2, J McLoughlin 0-1, M Murphy 0-1.

22 September 2024 Quarter-final	Kilbree	0-17 - 1-18	Newcestown	Castletown Grounds
	J Shanahan 0-7, D Coakley 0-4, E Shanahan 0-4, C Twohig 0-1, C Murphy 0-1.	Report	E Kelly 0-11, C Hurley 1-2, A Shorten 0-2, C O'Sullivan 0-1, P Collins 0-1, C Goggin 0-1.

=== Semi-finals ===
6 October 2024 Semi-final	Ballinascarthy	1-20 - 0-11	St James'	St Mary's Park
	J Ryan 0-7, B O'Donovan 1-3, T Cullinane 0-4, Cillian Cullinane 0-4, Conall Cullinane 0-2.	Report	J O'Driscoll 0-10, C Hayes 0-1.

6 October 2024 Semi-final	Diarmuid Ó Mathúna's	2-12 - 0-11	Newcestown	Páirc Uinseann
	C O'Donovan 0-7, K O'Donovan 1-2, G O'Donovan 1-1, S Crowley 0-1, C O'Sullivan 0-1.	Report	E Kelly 0-11.

=== Final ===
20 October 2024 Final	Ballinascarthy	0-13 - 0-13	Diarmuid Ó Mathúna's	St Mary's Park
	J Ryan 0-7, B O'Donovan 0-2, L Murray 0-1, T Cullinane 0-1, Cillian Cullinane 0-1, S Ryan 0-1.	Report	C O'Donovan 0-7, K O'Donovan 0-2, P Crowley 0-2, J Lucey 0-1, G O'Donovan 0-1.	Referee: A Long (Argideen Rangers)

=== Final replay ===
3 November 2024 Final replay	Ballinascarthy	1-12 - 1-14	Diarmuid Ó Mathúna's	St Mary's Park

== Championship statistics ==
=== Top scorers ===
Rank	Player	County	Tally	Total	Matches	Average
1	James O'Driscoll	St James'	3-42	51	4	12.75
2	Jeremy Ryan	Ballinascarthy	1-41	44	5	8.80
3	Eoin Kelly	Newcestown	0-43	43	4	10.74
4	Brian O'Donovan	Ballinascarthy	6-15	33	5	6.60
5	Caolan O'Donovan	Diarmuid Ó Mathúna's	1-27	30	5	6.00
