= 2025 Cork Junior A Hurling Championship =

Hurling competition

- Dates: 1 November – 30 November 2025
- Teams: 7
- Sponsor: Co-Op Superstores
- Champions: Kilshannig (1st title); Jack Twomey (captain); Bill Curtin (captain); Pat Murphy (manager)
- Runners-up: Ballinora; Shane Kingston (captain); Don O'Brien (manager)

Tournament statistics
- Matches played: 6
- Goals scored: 12 (2 per match)
- Points scored: 205 (34.17 per match)
- Top scorer(s): Ben Mayer (2-31)

The 2025 Cork Junior A Hurling Championship was the 128th staging of the Cork Junior A Hurling Championship since its establishment by the Cork County Board in 1895. The championship ran from 1 November to 30 November 2025.

The final was played on 30 November 2025 at SuperValu Páirc Uí Chaoimh in Cork, between Kilshannig and Ballinora, in what was their first ever meeting in the final. Kilshannig won the match by 1–19 to 0–11 to claim their first ever championship title.

Ballinora's Ben Mayer was the championship's Top scorer with 2-31.

== Qualification ==
| Division | Championship | Champions | # |
|---|---|---|---|
| Avondhu | North Cork Junior A Hurling Championship | Kilshannig | |
| Carbery | Carbery Junior A Hurling Championship | Ballinascarthy | |
| Carrigdhoun | South East Junior A Hurling Championship | Belgooly | |
| Duhallow | Duhallow Junior A Hurling Championship | Newmarket | |
| Imokilly | East Cork Junior A Hurling Championship | Cobh | |
| Muskerry | Mid Cork Junior A Hurling Championship | Ballinora | |
| Seandún | Cork City Junior A Hurling Championship | Whitechurch | |

== Divisional championships ==
=== Duhallow JAHC ===
Semi-Finals
Newmarket | 3–22
Banteer | 1–11
Dromtarriffe | 3–23
Kilbrin | 2–14

Final
Newmarket | 3–28
Dromtarriffe | 1–23

=== North Cork JAHC ===
==== Knockout stage ====
Quarter-Finals
Kilshannig | 3–21
Buttevant | 0–11
Charleville | 1–25
Killavullen | 1–26 (aet)

Semi-Finals
Liscarroll Churchtown Gaels | 0–17
Kilshannig | 0–20
Dromina | 1–15
Killavullen | 1–12

Final
Kilshannig | 1–18
Dromina | 2–13

Relegation playoff

Araglen 3–16 — 1–23 Shanballymore

=== Mid Cork JAHC ===
Semi-Finals
Donoughmore | 0–22
Grenagh | 2–21
Ballinora | 1–25
Inniscarra | 2–08

Final
Grenagh | 1–11
Ballinora | 0–22

=== Carbery JAHC ===
Quarter-Finals
Randal Óg | 0–17
Ballinascarthy | 1–17
Kilbree | 0–13
Dohenys | 0–12

Semi-Finals
Diarmuid Ó Mathúna's | 0–18
Ballinascarthy | 0–22
Newcestown | 2–11
Kilbree | 4–16

Final
Ballinascarthy | 0–22
Kilbree | 1–16

=== Cork City JAHC ===
Quarter-Final Playoffs
Glen Rovers | 1–22
White's Cross | 1–20

Quarter-Finals
Na Piarsaigh | 2–17
Glen Rovers | 0–15

Semi-Finals
Whitechurch | 0–19
Passage West | 0–18
Douglas | 1–17
Na Piarsaigh | 1–19

Final
Whitechurch | 0–11, 1–13
Na Piarsaigh | 0–11, 0–15

=== South East JAHC ===
Quarter-Finals
Ballymartle | 1–18
Ballinhassig | 3–10
Belgooly | 0–23
Carrigaline | 1–14

Semi-Finals
Kinsale | 4–14
Ballymartle | 0–21
Valley Rovers | 1–11
Belgooly | 1–17

Final
Kinsale | 1–17
Belgooly | 1–24

=== East Cork JAHC ===
Quarter-Finals
Bride Rovers | 2–24
Sarsfields | 2–22
Carrignavar | 1–13
Killeagh | 1–12

Semi-Finals
St Ita's | 1–15
Bride Rovers | 1–18
Cobh | 1–20
Carrignavar | 0–20

Final
Bride Rovers | 3–11
Cobh | 3–19

Relegation playoff

Fr O'Neill's 1–15 — 0–21 Carrigtwohill

== Fixtures and results ==
=== Bracket ===
Quarter-Finals
Kilshannig (Avondhu) | 1–14
Ballinascarthy (Carbery) | 0–13
Ballinora (Muskerry) | 2–25
Belgooly (Carrigdhoun) | 2–15
Whitechurch (Seandún) | 1–17
Cobh (Imokilly) | 3–17

Semi-Finals
Kilshannig (Avondhu) | 1–17
Newmarket (Duhallow) | 0–17
Ballinora (Muskerry) | 0–24
Cobh (Imokilly) | 1–16

Final
Kilshannig (Avondhu) | 1–19
Ballinora (Muskerry) | 0–11

=== Quarter-finals ===
| 1 November 2025 Quarter-final | Kilshannig | 1-14 - 0-13 | Ballinascarthy | Coachford Sportsfield |
| | C Ruby 1-2, P Walsh 0-3, E O'Hanlon 0-2, J Twomey 0-2, J Kearney 0-1, K Twomey 0-1, D O'Sullivan 0-1, R Crowley 0-1, C O'Shea 0-1. | Report | B O'Donovan 0-8, Cillian Cullinane 0-3, Connall Cullinane 0-1, E O'Driscoll 0-1. |

| 2 November 2025 Quarter-final | Whitechurch | 1-17 - 3-17 | Cobh | Páirc Tadhg Mac Cárthaigh |
| | J Hegarty 1-7, C Egan 0-3, D O'Sullivan 0-2, S Keane 0-2, D O'Connell 0-1, C O'Brien 0-1, R Buckley 0-1. | Report | T Wilk 1-10. |

| 9 November 2025 Quarter-final | Ballinora | 2-25 - 2-15 | Belgooly | Tracton Grounds |
| | B Mayer 2-14 (0-8 f, 0-2 65), L Lyons 0-5, A O'Shea, T Burns, M O’Brien, D Corkery, J Keohane, J Hegarty 0-1 each. | Report | B Dwyer 2-11 (0-8f); R Long 0-3, C O’Donovan 0-1. |

=== Semi-finals ===
| 16 November 2025 Semi-final | Newmarket | 0-17 - 1-17 | Kilshannig | Kanturk Grounds |
| | D Hannon 0-5 f, H O’Connor 0-4 (0-3 f), R Lynn 0-4, C O’Keeffe 0-2, C Crowley, R O’Keeffe 0-1 each. | Report | P Walsh 0-8 (0-7 f), E O’Hanlon 1-2, J Kearney, K Twomey (0-1 f), J Twomey 0-2 each, Darragh O’Sullivan 0-1. |

| 23 November 2025 Semi-final | Ballinora | 0-24 - 1-16 | Cobh | Páirc Uí Rinn |
| | B Mayer 0-11 (0-8 f), D Dineen 0-4, A O’Shea 0-3, S Kingston (f), D Holmes 0-2 each, J Hegarty, D Corkery 0-1 each. | Report | T Wilk 0-9 (0-7 f), A Lynch 1-1, E Cullinane, M O’Rourke 0-2 each, N O’Connell, D Kearney 0-1 each. |

=== Final ===
| 30 November 2025 Final | Kilshannig | 1-19 - 0-11 | Ballinora | SuperValu Páirc Uí Chaoimh |
| | E O’Hanlon 1-3, P Walsh (2 f), K Twomey (1 65) 0-4 each, J Twomey 0-3, Diarmuid O’Sullivan 0-2, K O’Hanlon, C Ruby, K Smith 0-1 each. | Report | B Mayer 0-6 (0-5 f), D Holmes, J Hegarty 0-2 each, C Quirke 0-1. | Referee: C McAllister (Aghada) |

== Championship statistics ==
=== Top scorers ===
| Rank | Player | Club | Tally | Total | Matches | Average |
|---|---|---|---|---|---|---|
| 1 | Ben Mayer | Ballinora | 2-31 | 37 | 3 | 13.33 |
| 2 | Timmy Wilk | Cobh | 1-19 | 22 | 2 | 11.00 |
| 3 | Barry Dwyer | Balgooly | 2-11 | 17 | 1 | 17.00 |
| 4 | Paddy Walsh | Kilshannig | 0-15 | 15 | 3 | 5.00 |
| 5 | Éanna O'Hanlon | Kilshannig | 2-07 | 13 | 3 | 4.33 |
