= 2023 Carbery Junior A Hurling Championship =

Annual Hurling competition season

- Dates: 5 August - 15 October 2023
- Teams: 11
- Sponsor: RCM Tarmacadam
- Champions: Clonakilty (18th title); Mark White (captain); Seán Byerley (manager)
- Runners-up: St James'; James O'Sullivan (captain); Johnny Deasy (manager)

Tournament statistics
- Matches played: 20
- Goals scored: 50 (2.5 per match)
- Points scored: 579 (28.95 per match)

The 2023 Carbery Junior A Hurling Championship was the 99th staging of the Carbery Junior A Hurling Championship since its establishment by the West Cork Board in 1925. The draw for the group stage placings took place on 8 December 2022. The championship ran from 5 August to 22 October 2023.

Ballinascarthy entered the championship as the defending champions, however, they were beaten by Clonakilty in the semi-finals.

The final was played on 15 October 2023 at Páirc Naomh Eoin in Newcestown, between Clonakilty and St James', in what was their first ever meeting in the final. Clonakilty won the match by 1–17 to 0–11 to claim their 18th championship title overall and a first title in three years.

== Team changes ==
=== To Championship ===
Promoted from the Carbery Junior B Hurling Championship

- Randal Óg

=== From Championship ===
Relegated to the Carbery Junior B Hurling Championship

- Kilbrittain
- Oliver Plunketts

== Group 1 ==
=== Group 1 table ===
Knockout stage

Team	Matches				Score			Pts
Team	Pld	W	D	L	For	Against	Diff	Pts
Kilbree	3	3	0	0	64	48	16	6
Clonakilty	3	2	0	1	62	43	19	4
Dohenys	3	1	0	2	41	55	-14	2
St Colum's	3	0	0	3	38	59	-21	0

=== Group 1 results ===
5 August 2023 Round 1	St Colum's	2-14 - 2-15	Kilbree	Castletown-Kinneigh Grounds
	S Murnane 2-10, E O'Sullivan 0-2, D McSweeney 0-1, T Cronin 0-1.		D McCarthy 0-10, E Shannon 1-0, D Coakley 1-0, J O'Donovan 0-3, M O'Donovan 0-1, C Murphy 0-1.

6 August 2023 Round 1	Clonakilty	2-16 - 1-12	Dohenys	Ballinacarriga Grounds
	S White 2-3, E Ryan 0-8, C kenneally 0-2, D Lowney 0-1, A Cullinane 0-1, M White 0-1.		J McCarthy 0-5, D Dullea 1-1, R Jennings 0-2, F Herlihy 0-2, M Buckley 0-1, A O'Donovan 0-1.

13 August 2023 Round 2	Dohenys	2-09 - 0-12	St Colum's	Wolfe Tone Park

13 August 2023 Round 2	Clonakilty	1-14 - 4-10	Kilbree	St Mary's Park
	E Ryan 0-9, S White 1-1, C Kenneally 0-2, L O'Donovan 0-1, D Lowney 0-1.		J O'Donovan 3-2, D McCarthy 0-5, M O'Donovan 1-1, D Coakley 0-1, D Coffey 0-1.

2 September 2023 Round 3	Dohenys	1-08 - 1-18	Kilbree	Páirc Uinsinn
	A O'Donovan 1-0, F Herlihy 0-3, J McCarthy 0-3, J Farrell 0-1, D Dullea 0-1.		D McCarthy 0-9, J O'Donovan 1-2, MD Keohane 0-2, D Coffey 0-1, B Deasy 0-1, M O'Donovan 0-1, S O'Donovan 0-1, O O'Sullivan 0-1.

2 September 2023 Round 3	Clonakilty	1-20 - 0-06	St Colum's	Páirc Naomh Eoin

== Group 2 ==
=== Group 2 table ===
Knockout stage

Team	Matches				Score			Pts
Team	Pld	W	D	L	For	Against	Diff	Pts
Ballinascarthy	2	2	0	0	41	35	6	4
St James'	3	1	0	1	39	40	-1	2
Bandon	2	0	0	2	36	41	-5	0

=== Group 2 results ===
6 August 2023 Round 1	Ballinascarthy	2-15 - 0-18	St James'	Sam Maguire Park
	B O'Donovan 1-2, S Ryan 1-1, Connall Cullinane 0-3, Cillian Cullinane 0-2, L Murray 0-2, J Ryan 0-2, S Conlon 0-1, R O'Flynn 0-1, J O'Brien 0-1.		J O'Driscoll 0-13, I Evans 0-3, K O'Donovan 0-2.

13 August 2023 Round 2	Ballinascarthy	0-20 - 2-11	Bandon	Páirc Uinsinn
	B O'Donovan 0-11, Cillian Cullinane 0-2, S Conlon 0-2, J Ryan 0-2, S Ryan 0-1, R O'Flynn 0-1, D Nyhan 0-1.		P Barry 1-3, H Lillis 1-0, R Fogarty 0-3, J Lillis 0-3, J Hickey 0-1, B O'Mahony 0-1.

3 September 2023 Round 3	Bandon	1-16 - 1-18	St James'	Páirc Uí Mhurchú
	J Hickey 0-6, J Lillis 1-0, S Collins 0-3, R Desmond 0-2, R Fogarty 0-2, H Lillis 0-1, H O'Mahony 0-1, D Lucey 0-1.		J O'Driscoll 0-12, K O'Donovan 1-1, J O'Sullivan 0-3, I Evans 0-1, C Hayes 0-1.

== Group 3 ==
=== Group 3 table ===
Knockout stage

Team	Matches				Score			Pts
Team	Pld	W	D	L	For	Against	Diff	Pts
Diarmuid Ó Mathúna's	3	2	0	1	57	59	-2	4
Newcestown	3	2	0	1	52	43	9	4
Randal Óg	3	1	0	2	50	52	-2	2
St Mary's	3	1	0	2	50	55	-5	2

=== Group 3 results ===
6 August 2023 Round 1	Newcestown	1-18 - 0-10	St Mary's	Rossmore Grounds
	D Twomey 1-7, C Hurley 0-3, S O'Sullivan 0-3, E Kelly 0-3, D McSweeney 0-1, G Murphy 0-1.		D O'Donovan 0-9, I O'Donovan 0-1.

6 August 2023 Round 1	Randal Óg	2-13 - 1-18	Diarmuid Ó Mathúna's	Charlie Hurley Park
	S Daly 0-5, D Collins 1-1, C Duggan 1-1, P Collins 0-3, E O'Donovan 0-2, S Kingston 0-1.		J Lucey 0-11, G O'Donovan 1-2, C O'Sullivan 0-2, R Lucey 0-1, K O'Donovan 0-1, T Lordan 0-1.

12 August 2023 Round 2	Randal Óg	1-14 - 1-12	St Mary's	Castletown-Kinneigh Grounds
	S Daly 0-9, D Collins 1-0, E O'Donovan 0-2, J O'Sullivan 0-1, C Duggan 0-1, S Crowley 0-1.		D O'Donovan 0-10, P McNamara 1-0, J Collins 0-1, A O'Driscoll 0-1.

13 August 2023 Round 2	Newcestown	0-15 - 2-13	Diarmuid Ó Mathúna's	St Mary's Park
	D Twomey 0-8, S O'Sullivan 0-4, G Murphy 0-1, D McSweeney 0-1, O Walsh 0-1.		P Crowley 1-3, C O'Sullivan 1-1, J Lucey 0-4, J O'Callaghan 0-3, G O'Donovan 0-1, T Lordan 0-1.

2 September 2023 Round 3	St Mary's	4-13 - 2-11	Diarmuid Ó Mathúna's	St James' Park

3 September 2023 Round 3	Newcestown	0-16 - 1-11	Randal Óg	Ahamilla Complex
	E Kelly 0-4, M Kennelly 0-4, D Twomey 0-3, S O'Sullivan 0-2, C O'Neill 0-1, T Horgan 0-1, C Clarke 0-1.		P Collins 0-5, S Crowley 1-0, D Collins 0-1, J O'Sullivan 0-1, L O'Donovan 0-1, C O'Connell 0-1, E O'Donovan 0-1, A Brickley 0-1.

== Knockout stage ==
=== Quarter-finals ===
17 September 2023 Quarter-final	Newcestown	0-14 - 1-16	Clonakilty	Rossmore Grounds
	E Kelly 0-7, D Twomey 0-3, S O'Sullivan 0-2, M Kenneally 0-1, C Goggin 0-1.	Report	E Ryan 0-8, M White 1-2, B White 0-2, C O'Donovan 0-2, D Lowney 0-1, A Cullinane 0-1.

17 September 2023 Quarter-final	Diarmuid Ó Mathúna's	2-16 - 1-19; Penalties: 3-4	St James'	Ballinacarriga Grounds
	J Lucey 1-10, J O'Callaghan 1-0, W Horgan 0-3, T Lordan 0-1, C O'Sullivan 0-1, G O'Donovan 0-1.	Report	J O'Driscoll 0-14, K O'Donovan 1-0, K O'Brien 0-3, P O'Sullivan 0-1, M Evans 0-1.

=== Semi-finals ===
8 October 2023 Semi-final	Kilbree	1-09 - 1-19	St James'	Páirc Uinsinn
	D Coakley 0-4, MD Keohane 1-0, K Keohane 0-1, O O'Sullivan 0-1, D Coffey 0-1, D McCarthy 0-1.	Report	J O'Driscoll 0-10, A Hayes 1-6, K O'Brien 0-1, P O'Sullivan 0-1, M Evans 0-1.

8 October 2023 Semi-final	Ballinascarthy	2-22 - 3-20 (aet)	Clonakilty	St Mary's Park
	J Ryan 0-9, B O'Donovan 1-4, Conall Cullinane 1-2, R O'Flynn 0-4, E Ferguson 0-1, C O'Neill 0-1, C Nyhan 0-1.	Report	M White 2-2, E Ryan 0-6, S White 1-2, C Kenneally 0-3, B White 0-3, N Barrett 0-1, K Cormican 0-1, F Murphy 0-1, F McCarthy 0-1.

=== Final ===
15 October 2023 Final	Clonakilty	1-17 - 0-11	St James'	Páirc Naomh Eoin
	M White 1-5, E Ryan 0-6, S White 0-3, B White 0-1, C Kenneally 0-1, J O'Mahony 0-1.	Report	J O'Driscoll 0-8, A Hayes 0-1, P O'Sullivan 0-1, J O'Sullivan 0-1.	Referee: J Forbes (Dohenys)
