= Carbery Junior A Football Championship =

Youth Gaelic football competition in Ireland

- Irish: Craobh Peile Sóisear A Cairbre
- Code: Gaelic football
- Founded: 1926; 100 years ago
- Region: Carbery (GAA)
- Trophy: Mick McCarthy Cup
- No. of teams: 16
- Title holders: Barryroe (2nd title)
- Most titles: Bandon (16 titles)
- Sponsors: Bandon Co-op
- Official website: Carbery GAA

The Carbery Junior A Football Championship (known for sponsorship reasons as the Bandon Co-op Carbery Junior A Football Championship and abbreviated to the Carbery JAFC) is an annual club Gaelic football competition organised by the West Cork Board of the Gaelic Athletic Association and contested by the top-ranking junior clubs in West Cork, Ireland, deciding the competition winners through a group stage and knockout format. It is the most prestigious competition in West Cork Gaelic football.

Introduced in 1926 as the West Cork Junior Championship, it was initially a straight knockout tournament. The competition went through a number of format changes since then, including the introduction of a back-door or second chance for beaten teams. The competition took on its current format in 2022, adding a round-robin group stage and limiting the number of entrants.

In its current format, the Carbery Junior A Football Championship begins with a group stage in late summer. The 16 participating teams are divided into four groups of four and play each other in a round-robin system. The two top-ranking teams in each group proceed to the knockout phase that culminates with the final. The winner of the Carbery JAFC, as well as receiving the Mick McCarthy Cup, also qualifies for the subsequent Cork Junior A Football Championship.

The competition has been won by 22 teams, 19 of which have won it more than once. Bandon are the most successful team in the tournament's history, having won it 16 times. Barryroe are the title-holders, after defeating St Mary's by 1–09 to 0–09 in the 2026 final.

== Format ==
=== Group stage ===
The 16 teams are divided into four groups of four. Over the course of the group stage, each team plays once against the others in the group, resulting in each team being guaranteed at least three games. Two points are awarded for a win, one for a draw and zero for a loss. The teams are ranked in the group stage table by points gained, then scoring difference and then their head-to-head record. The top two teams in each group qualify for the knockout stage.

=== Knockout stage ===
Quarter-finals: The four group winners are paired with the four group runners-up. Four teams qualify for the next round.

Semi-finals: The four quarter-final winners contest this round. The two winners from these games advance to the final.

Final: The two semi-final winners contest the final. The winning team are declared champions.

== Teams ==
=== 2026 Teams ===
The 16 teams competing in the 2026 Carbery Junior A Football Championship are:

Team	Location	Colours	In championship since	Position in 2026	Championship Titles	Last Championship Title
Argideen Rangers	Timoleague	Maroon and white	2018	Group stage	1	1994
Ballinascarthy	Ballinascarthy	Red and white	?	Group stage	2	1983
Barryroe	Barryroe	Blue and navy	?	Champions	2	2026
Carbery Rangers	Rosscarbery	Green, white and gold	?	Quarter-finals	10	2003
Castlehaven	Castlehaven	Blue and white	?	Quarter-finals	2	1976
Diarmuid Ó Mathúna's	Castletown-Kinneigh	Blue and yellow	?	Group stage	0	—
Goleen	Goleen	Yellow and black	2025	Quarter-finals	0	—
Kilbrittain	Kilbrittain	Black and yellow	?	Group stage	1	1926
Kilmeen	Rossmore	Blue and white	2023	Quarter-finals	0	—
Newcestown	Newcestown	Red and yellow	2026	Group stage	4	1990
Randal Óg	Ballinacarriga	Yellow and green	2022	Group stage	0	—
St Colum's	Kealkill	Black and orange	?	Group stage	1	2013
St James'	Ardfield	Green and gold	2025	Semi-finals	2	2022
St Mary's	Enniskean	Yellow and black	?	Runners-up	2	2014
St Oliver Plunketts	Ahiohill	Black and white	2024	Group stage	0	—
Tadhg Mac Cárthaigh's	Caheragh	Red and yellow	?	Semi-finals	7	2021

== Trophy and medals ==
The Mick McCarthy Perpetual Memorial Cup is the current prize for winning the championship. It was commissioned to honour Mick McCarthy who played for O'Donovan Rossa, Carbery, Cork and Munster, and who died from injuries sustained in a road traffic accident on 5 February 1998, at the age of 33. The cup was unveiled in October 1998 and first presented to Eugene Murphy, captain of the Carbery Rangers team which won the 1998 final. The cup replaced the Little Norah Cup which, after being donated by Beamish and Crawford in 1949, was last presented in 1997.

In accordance with GAA rules, the West Cork Board awards a set of medals to the championship winners.

== Sponsorship ==
Period	Sponsor(s)	Name	#
	Buckley Financial	The Buckley Financial South West Junior A Football Championship	
2014-2018	Rowa/Rowex Pharma	The Rowa/Rowex Pharma South West Junior A Football Championship	
2019-	Bandon Co-Op	The Bandon Co-Op Carbery Junior A Football Championship	

== Roll of honour ==
=== By club ===
#	Club	Titles	Runners-up	Championships won	Championships runner-up
1	Bandon	16	2	1929, 1947, 1950, 1951, 1952, 1953, 1960, 1970, 1971, 1975, 1986, 1989, 2007, 2008, 2011, 2015	1941, 1964
2	Dohenys	12	10	1927, 1931, 1935, 1956, 1957, 1958, 1959, 1962, 1965, 1966, 1992, 1993	1928, 1930, 1932, 1940, 1948, 1949, 1950, 1961, 1963, 1990
3	Carbery Rangers	10	14	1937, 1938, 1939, 1940, 1980, 1984, 1987, 1991, 1998, 2003	1942, 1943, 1946, 1955, 1956, 1973, 1975, 1978, 1992, 1995, 1996, 1999, 2000, 2020
4	Bantry Blues	9	7	1928, 1932, 1944, 1946, 1947, 1968, 1969, 1972, 1985	1931, 1936, 1937, 1947, 1967, 1970, 1971
5	O'Donovan Rossa	7	7	1945, 1961, 1963, 1974, 1979, 1982, 2005	1933, 1951, 1952, 1954, 1957, 1976, 2004
5	Tadhg Mac Cárthaigh's	7	5	1995, 1997, 2002, 2004, 2006, 2012, 2021	1977, 1998, 2008, 2013, 2018
7	Kilmacabea	5	2	2017, 2018, 2020, 2024, 2025	2015, 2023
8	Newcestown	4	6	1964, 1967, 1988, 1990	1962, 1965, 1966, 1981, 1982, 1989
8	Clann na nGael	4	5	1941, 1942, 1943 (Rock Rovers), 1981	1958, 1984, 1988, 2010, 2011
8	Clonakilty	4	4	1930, 1948, 1949, 1977	1926, 1929, 1972, 1974
8	Ilen Rovers	4	1	1996, 1999, 2000, 2001	1997
12	Enniskean	3	1	1933, 1934, 1936	1938
13	Ballinascarthy	2	8	1978, 1983	1959, 1960, 1968, 1969, 1985, 1986, 1991, 2019
13	St Mary's	2	5	2009, 2014	1944, 1945, 2021, 2025, 2026
13	Gabriel Rangers	2	4	2010, 2016	1979, 1983, 2005, 2014
13	Darrara	2	2	1954, 1955	1934, 1953
13	Castlehaven	2	0	1973, 1976	—
13	St James’s	2	0	2019, 2022	—
19	St Colum's	1	3	2013	2001, 2006, 2016
19	Barryroe	2	3	2023, 2026	1980, 1994, 2003
19	Kilbrittain	1	2	1926	1993, 2017
19	Argideen Rangers	1	1	1994	2022
23	St Oliver Plunketts	0	2	—	2009, 2012
23	Diarmuid Ó Mathúna's	0	2	—	2002, 2024
23	Innishannon	0	1	—	1927
23	Barley Hill	0	1	—	1935
23	Kilmeen	0	1	—	1987
23	Muintir Bháire	0	1	—	2007

== List of finals ==
Year	Winners		Runners-up		Venue	Winning captain	#
Year	Club	Score	Club	Score	Venue	Winning captain	#
1926	Kilbrittain	0-04	Clonakilty	1-00	Clonakilty Grounds		
1927	Dohenys	0-04	Innishannon	0-02			
1928	Bantry Blues	2-02	Dohenys	0-05			
1929	Bandon	1-01	Clonakilty	0-03	Innshannon Grounds		
1930	Clonakilty	2-05	Dohenys	0-02	Clonakilty Grounds		
1931	Dohenys	1-01	Bantry Blues	0-02	Sam Maguire Park		
1932	Bantry Blues	1-05	Dohenys	0-01	Rossa Park		
1933	Enniskeane	1-05	O'Donovan Rossa	2-01	Rossa Park		
1934	Enniskeane	0-02	Darrara	0-01			
1935	Dohenys	w/o	Barley Hill	scr			
1936	Enniskeane	2-04	Bantry Blues	1-03	Clonakilty Grounds		
1937	Carbery Rangers	3-04	Bantry Blues	2-00	Rossa Park		
1938	Carbery Rangers	w/o	Enniskeane	scr.			
1939	Carbery Rangers	1-05	O'Donovan Rossa	1-01			
1940	Carbery Rangers	2-01	Dohenys	0-03	St Mary's Park		
1941	Drimoleague	0-05	Bandon	0-01	St Mary's Park		
1942	Drimoleague	1-00	Carbery Rangers	0-02	St Mary's Park		
1943	Rock Rovers	2-01	Carbery Rangers	0-04	Rossa Park		
1944	Bantry Blues	2-04	St. Mary's	0-02	Sam Maguire Park		
1945	O'Donovan Rossa	4-07	St. Mary's	3-01	Clonakilty Grounds		
1946	Bantry Blues	2-05	Carbery Rangers	1-03			
1947	Bandon	3-02	Bantry Blues	0-10	Sam Maguire Park		
1948	Clonakilty	1-05	Dohenys	1-02	St Mary's Park		
1949	Clonakilty	3-04	Dohenys	1-03			
1950	Bandon	2-03	Dohenys	0-01	Clonakilty Grounds		
1951	Bandon	1-01	O'Donovan Rossa	1-03	Clonakilty Grounds		
1952	Bandon	1-04	O'Donovan Rossa	1-02			
1953	Bandon	2-06	Darrara	2-02	Bandon Grounds		
1954	Darrara	4-08	O'Donovan Rossa	0-02	Sam Maguire Park		
1955	Darrara	1-11	Carbery Rangers	1-03			
1956	Dohenys	3-04	Carbery Rangers	1-02	Clonakilty Grounds		
1957	Dohenys	2-04	O'Donovan Rossa	0-05	Clonakilty Grounds		
1958	Dohenys	7-05	Clann na nGael	0-02	Clonakilty Grounds	Michael Farr	
1959	Dohenys	2-09	Ballinascarthy	1-02	Clonakilty Grounds		
1960	Bandon	2-09	Ballinascarthy	0-05	Sam Maguire Park	Denis O'Donovan	
1961	O'Donovan Rossa	3-01	Dohenys	1-06	Wolfe Tone Park		
1962	Dohenys	2-06	Newcestown	0-04	Bandon Grounds	Derry White	
1963	O'Donovan Rossa	1-06	Dohenys	1-05	Clonakilty Grounds	Pat Laverty	
1964	Newcestown	3-04	Bandon	1-01	Clonakilty Grounds	Dermot Kehilly	
1965	Dohenys	2-09	Newcestown	1-00	Bandon Grounds	John Crowley	
1966	Dohenys	3-03	Newcestown	2-04	Bandon Grounds	D. D. Lyons	
1967	Newcestown	0-08	Bantry Blues	0-05	Sam Maguire Park	Tim Joe Collins	
1968	Bantry Blues	1-12	Ballinascarthy	0-05	Rossa Park	Donal Hunt	
1969	Bantry Blues	2-07	Ballinascarthy	0-11	Rossa Park	Donal Hunt	
1970	Bandon	2-09	Bantry Blues	0-03	Clonakilty Grounds	Pa Harrington	
1971	Bandon	3-10	Bantry Blues	1-14	Sam Maguire Park	Jimmy Gabriel	
1972	Bantry Blues	3-14	Carbery Rangers	2-03	Sam Maguire Park	P. J. Minihane	
1973	Castlehaven	0-15	Carbery Rangers	1-10	Rossa Park	Morgan Courtney	
1974	O'Donovan Rossa	1-11	Clonakilty	1-06	Rosscarbery Grounds	Dinny Kelly	
1975	Bandon	1-12	Carbery Rangers	0-06	Clonakilty Grounds	Robert Wilmot	
1976	Castlehaven	1-06	O'Donovan Rossa	1-05	Rosscarbery Grounds	Christy Collins	
1977	Clonakilty	3-13	Tadhg Mac Cárthaigh	2-03	Rossa Park	Gabriel Quirke	
1978	Ballinascarthy	0-09	Carbery Rangers	0-08	Sam Maguire Park	Teddy Holland	
1979	O'Donovan Rossa	3-11	Gabriel Rangers	1-06	Wolfe Tone Park	Pat Hanrahan	
1980	Carbery Rangers	0-13	Barryroe	1-06	Clonakilty Grounds	Michael Paul Hicks	
1981	Clann na nGael	0-06	Newcestown	0-05	Sam Maguire Park	Derry Deane	
1982	O'Donovan Rossa	0-08	Gabriel Rangers	1-04	Rosscarbery Grounds	Finbarr Kearney	
1983	Ballinascarthy	1-09	Gabriel Rangers	2-05	Rosscarbery Grounds	John O'Donovan	
1984	Carbery Rangers	1-08	Clann na nGael	0-05	St. Mary's	Finbarr Santry	
1985	Bantry Blues	0-10	Ballinascarthy	0-09	Sam Maguire Park	John Hutchinson	
1986	Bandon	1-07	Ballinascarthy	0-08	St. Mary's Park	Niall Crowley	
1987	Carbery Rangers	0-14	Kilmeen	0-05	Clonakilty Grounds	Michael O'Rourke	
1988	Newcestown	5-04	Clann na nGael	2-08	Sam Maguire Park	Tim Buckley	
1989	Bandon	1-10	Newcestown	1-07	Clonakilty Grounds	Niall Crowley	
1990	Newcestown	4-05	Dohenys	1-06	Rossmore Grounds	Thomas Crowley	
1991	Carbery Rangers	1-11	Ballinascarthy	1-05	Sam Maguire Park	Kevin Santry	
1992	Dohenys	2-10	Carbery Rangers	1-08	Páirc Tadhg na Samhna	Barry Herlihy	
1993	Dohenys	1-10	Kilbrittain	1-06	Clonakilty Grounds	Kieran Farr	
1994	Argideen Rangers	0-07	Barryroe	0-05	Kilbrittain Grounds	Tadhg Crowley	
1995	Tadhg Mac Cárthaigh	1-13	Carbery Rangers	0-09	Rossa Park	Denis O'Sullivan	
1996	Ilen Rovers	3-11	Carbery Rangers	0-04	Castlehaven Grounds	Fachtna Collins	
1997	Tadhg Mac Cárthaigh	3-10	Ilen Rovers	2-07	Castlehaven Grounds	Pat Hegarty	
1998	Carbery Rangers	2-06	Tadhg Mac Cárthaigh	0-10	Sam Maguire Park	Eugene Murphy	
1999	Ilen Rovers	1-16	Carbery Rangers	1-14	Aughaville Grounds	Pat Connolly	
2000	Ilen Rovers	1-15	Carbery Rangers	3-07	Castlehaven Grounds	Donal Murphy	
2001	Ilen Rovers	0-19	St. Colum's	0-09	Wolfe Tone Park	Martin Cronin	
2002	Tadhg Mac Cárthaigh	0-13	Diarmuid Ó Mathúna's	0-11	Rosscarbery Grounds	Tadhg Deasy	
2003	Carbery Rangers	0-15	Barryroe	0-06	St. Mary's Park	Johnny Murphy	
2004	Tadhg Mac Cárthaigh	1-06	O'Donovan Rossa	1-05	Castlehaven Grounds	Mike Kingston	
2005	O'Donovan Rossa	1-09	Gabriel Rangers	0-08	Rosscarbery Grounds	Martin Bohane	
2006	Tadhg Mac Cárthaigh	0-13	St. Colum's	0-06	Wolfe Tones Park	Seán O'Sullivan	
2007	Bandon	1-11	Muintir Bháire	0-11	Ballinacarriga Grounds	Kevin Walsh	
2008	Bandon	1-13	Tadhg Mac Cárthaigh	0-11	Sam Maguire Park	Kevin Walsh	
2009	St. Mary's	1-11	St. Oliver Plunkett's	0-12	Castletown Grounds	Stephen Keohane	
2010	Gabriel Rangers	1-09	Clann na nGael	0-08	Rossa Park	Kieran O'Callaghan	
2011	Bandon	2-12	Clann na nGael	1-09	Ahamilla Complex	Alan Johnson	
2012	Tadhg Mac Cárthaigh	0-21	St. Oliver Plunkett's	1-16	Leap Grounds	Colm O'Driscoll	
2013	St. Colum's	1-09	Tadhg Mac Cárthaigh	0-07	Sam Maguire Park	Shane McSweeney	
2014	St. Mary's	1-09	Gabriel Rangers	0-11	Aughaville Grounds	Jason Collins	
2015	Bandon	1-10	Kilmacabea	0-08	Henry Ford Park	Pat Prendergast	
2016	Gabriel Rangers	2-09	St. Colum's	1-08	Aughaville Grounds	Mark Cronin	
2017	Kilmacabea	2-08	Kilbrittain	2-04	Ahamilla Complex	Clive Sweetnam	
2018	Kilmacabea	0-15	Tadhg Mac Carthaigh's	0-10	Páirc Tadhg na Samhna	Niall Hayes	
2019	St. James'	0-11	Ballinascarthy	0-09	Or Lady's Well Grounds	Joe O'Sullivan	
2020	Kilmacabea	1-18	Carbery Rangers	0-07	St. James' Park	Joe Collins	
2021	Tadhg Mac Carthaigh's	2-10	St Mary's	1-08	Sam Maguire Park	Brian O'Driscoll	
2022	St. James'	0-11	Argideen Rangers	0-05	Páirc Uinsinn	Conor Hayes	
2023	Barryroe	1-12	Kilmacabea	0-14	Sam Maguire Park	David O'Sullivan	
2024	Kilmacabea	1-12	Diarmuid Ó Mathúna's	1-04	Sam Maguire Park	Diarmuid O'Callaghan	
2025	Kilmacabea	0-15	St Mary's	0-10	Rossa Park	Ian Jennings	
2026	Barryroe	1-09	St Mary's	0–09			

Notes:

- 1926 - The first match ended in a draw.
- 1935 - The first match ended in a draw: Dohenys 2-01, Barley Hill 2-01.
- 1938 - The first match ended in a draw: Carbery Rangers 2-02, Enniskeane 2-02.
- 1943 - The first match ended in a draw: Rock Rovers 1-06, Carbery Rangers 2-03.
- 1945 - The first match ended in a draw: O'Donovan Rossa 1-04, St Mary's 2-01.
- 1951 - Bandon won the title after an objection.
- 1960 - The first match ended in a draw: Bandon 1-05, Ballinascarthy 2-02.
- 1971 - The first match ended in a draw: Bandon 1-08, Bantry Blues 1-08.
- 1974 - The first match ended in a draw: O'Donovan Rossa 0-12, Clonakilty 2-06.
- 1985 - The first match ended in a draw: Bantry Blues 2-08, Ballinascarthy 1-11.
- 1990 - The first match ended in a draw: Newcestown 1-09, Dohenys 2-06.
- 1999 - The first match ended in a draw: Ilen Rovers 0-13, Carbery Rangers 1-10.
- 2013 - The first match ended in a draw: St Colum's 1-05, Tadhg Mac Cárthaigh 0-08.
- 2014 - The first match ended in a draw: St Mary's 1-08, Gabriel Rangers 0-11.
- 2018 - The first match ended in a draw: Kilmacabea 0-12, Tadhg Mac Carthaigh's 2-06.
- 2023 - Extra time was played after the match ended in a draw: Barryroe 1-10, Kilmacabea 0-13.

== Records ==
=== By decade ===
The most successful team of each decade, judged by number of West Cork Junior Football Championship titles, is as follows:

- 1920s: 1 each for Kilbrittain (1926), Dohenys (1927), Bantry Blues (1928) and Bandon (1929)
- 1930s: 3 for Carbery Rangers (1937-38-39)
- 1940s: 3 for Clann na nGael (1941-43)
- 1950s: 4 each for Bandon (1950-51-52-53) and Dohenys (1956-57-58-59)
- 1960s: 3 for Dohenys (1962-65-66)
- 1970s: 3 for Bandon (1970-71-75)
- 1980s: 3 for Carbery Rangers (1980-84-87)
- 1990s: 2 each for Carbery Rangers (1991-98), Dohenys (1992-93), Tadhg Mac Cárthaigh's (1995-97) and Ilen Rovers (1996-99)
- 2000s: 3 for Tadhg Mac Cárthaigh's (2002-04-06)
- 2010s: 2 each for Gabriel Rangers (2010-16), Bandon (2011-15) and Kilmacabea (2017-18)

=== Successful defending ===
10 teams of the 21 who have won the championship have successfully defended the title. These are:

- Bandon on 5 occasions (1951, 1952, 1953, 1971 and 2008)
- Dohenys on 5 occasions (1957, 1958, 1959, 1966 and 1993)
- Carbery Rangers on 3 occasions {1938, 1939 and 1940)
- Bantry Blues on 2 occasions (1947 and 1969)
- Ilen Rovers on 2 occasions (2000 and 2001)
- Clonakilty on 1 occasion (1949)
- Enniskean on 1 occasion (1934)
- Clann na nGael on 1 occasion (1942)
- Darrara on 1 occasion (1955)
- Kilmacabea on 1 occasion (2018)

=== Gaps ===
Top ten longest gaps between successive championship titles:

- 40 years: Carbery Rangers (1940-1980)
- 39 years: Clann na nGael (1942-1981)
- 28 years: Clonakilty (1949-1977)
- 26 years: Dohenys (1966-1992)
- 23 years: O'Donovan Rossa (1982-2005)
- 22 years: Bantry Blues (1932-1944)
- 21 years: Dohenys (1935-1956)
- 21 years: Bantry Blues (1947-1968)
- 21 years: Newcestown (1967-1988)
- 18 years: Bandon (1929-1947)
- 18 years: Clonakilty (1930-1948)
- 18 years: Bandon (1989-2007)

=== The Double ===
Five teams have won the South West Junior Football Championship and the South West Junior Hurling Championship in a single year as part of a Gaelic football-hurling double. Kilbrittain became the first team to win the double in 1926. Bandon are the record holders having claimed the double on four occasions - 1929, 1960, 1971 and 1975. Dohenys are the only club to have won a back-to-back double - 1958 and 1959. Newcestown (1967) and Clonakilty (1977) complete the list of double-winning teams.

Club sides Argideen Rangers, Ballinascarthy and O'Donovan Rossa also hold the distinction of being dual divisional junior championship-winning teams, however, these were not achieved in a single calendar season.

== See also ==
- Carbery Junior A Hurling Championship
