= 1989 Cork Junior A Hurling Championship =

- Dates: 24 September – 12 November 1989
- Teams: 7
- Champions: Clyda Rovers (1st title); John Roche (captain)
- Runners-up: Ballinascarthy; John O'Donovan (captain)

Tournament statistics
- Matches played: 7
- Goals scored: 22 (3.14 per match)
- Points scored: 140 (20 per match)
- Top scorer(s): Colman Murphy (0-20)

The 1989 Cork Junior A Hurling Championship was the 92nd staging of the Cork Junior A Hurling Championship since its establishment by the Cork County Board. The championship ran from 24 September to 14 November 1989.

The final was played on 14 November 1989 at the Cloughduv Grounds, between Clyda Rovers and Ballinascarthy, in what was their first ever meeting in the final. Clyda Rovers won the match, a replay, by 0-11 to 1-07 to claim their first ever championship title.

Ballinascarthy's Colman Murphy was the championship's top scorer with 0-20.

== Qualification ==
| Division | Championship | Champions |
|---|---|---|
| Avondhu | North Cork Junior A Hurling Championship | Clyda Rovers |
| Carbery | South West Junior A Hurling Championship | Ballinascarthy |
| Carrigdhoun | South East Junior A Hurling Championship | Kinsale |
| Duhallow | Duhallow Junior A Hurling Championship | Kilbrin |
| Imokilly | East Cork Junior A Hurling Championship | Midleton |
| Muskerry | Mid Cork Junior A Hurling Championship | Aghabullogue |
| Seandún | City Junior A Hurling Championship | Na Piarsaigh |

== Results ==
=== Quarter-finals ===
| 24 September 1989 Quarter-final | Clyda Rovers | 1-14 - 1-11 | Midleton | Castletownroche Grounds |
| | T O'Callaghan 0-5, P Curtin 1-1, M O'Hanlon 0-4, J O'Sullivan 0-2, J Buckley 0-1, C O'Sullivan 0-1. | | R Fitzgerald 0-5, K O'Hanlon 1-1, E Murphy 0-2, J Power 0-1, G Glavin 0-1, N O'Neill 0-1. |

| 24 September 1989 Quarter-final | Kilbrin | 4-10 - 2-08 | Na Piarsaigh | Castletownroche Grounds |
| | J Sheehan 2-1, S O'Reilly 2-1, D O'Sullivan 0-4, D Sheehan 0-2, B Cashman 0-1, S Butler 0-1. | | R Dalton 1-3, L Martin 1-0, D Kidney 0-2, P Connery 0-1, M Dineen 0-1, D Murphy 0-1. |

| 8 October 1989 Quarter-final | Ballinascarthy | 4-09 - 1-15 | Aghabullogue | Cloughduv Grounds |
| | L Deasy 2-1, Colman Murphy 0-4, J Kingston 1-0, R O'Flynn 1-0, G Ryan 0-3, D Murphy 0-1. | | S Noonan 1-8, M Buckley 0-2, T Ó Murchú 0-2, N Looney 0-1, P Martin 0-1, D O'Connell 0-1. |

=== Semi-finals ===
| 22 October 1989 Semi-final | Clyda Rovers | 2-08 - 0-10 | Kilbrin | Kanturk Grounds |
| | P Curtin 2-0, T O'Callaghan 0-3, B Kelleher 0-2, M O'Hanlon 0-1, J Buckley 0-1, C O'Sullivan 0-1. | | D O'Sullivan 0-5, D Sheehan 0-1, J Sheehan 0-1, S Butler 0-1, P Field 0-1, J O'Callaghan 0-1. |

| 22 October 1989 Semi-final | Ballinascarthy | 2-16 - 2-03 | Kinsale | Charlie Hurley Park |
| | C Murphy 0-7, G Ryan 1-3, L Deasy 1-0, D Murphy 0-2, K Ryan 0-1, P Crowley 0-1, J Kingston 0-1, R O'Flynn 0-1. | | D Dunne 1-0, P Forde 1-0, G Irwin 0-3. |

=== Final ===
| 5 November 1989 Final | Clyda Rovers | 0-12 - 2-06 | Ballinascarthy | Páirc Uí Chaoimh |
| | T O'Callaghan 0-5, M O'Hanlon 0-3, B Kelleher 0-2, G O'Sullivan 0-1, P Curtin 0-1. | | L Deasy 1-0, J Kingston 1-0, C Murphy 0-3, K Ryan 0-2, G Ryan 0-1. |

| 12 November 1989 Final replay | Clyda Rovers | 0-11 - 1-07 | Ballinascarthy | Cloughduv Grounds |
| | B Kelleher 0-3, T O'Callaghan 0-2, C O'Sullivan 0-2, M O'Hanlon 0-2, J Buckley 0-1, J O'Sullivan 0-1. | | C Murphy 0-6, L Deasy 1-0, J Kingston 0-1. |

== Championship statistics ==
=== Top scorers ===
Overall

| Rank | Player | County | Tally | Total | Matches | Average |
|---|---|---|---|---|---|---|
| 1 | Colman Murphy | Ballinascarthy | 0-20 | 20 | 4 | 5.00 |
| 2 | Liam Deasy | Ballinascarthy | 5-01 | 16 | 4 | 4.00 |
| 3 | Timmy O'Callaghan | Clyda Rovers | 0-15 | 15 | 4 | 3.75 |
| 4 | Paudie Curtin | Clyda Rovers | 3-02 | 11 | 4 | 2.75 |
| 4 | Seánie Noonan | Aghabullogue | 1-08 | 11 | 1 | 11.00 |
| 6 | Jerry Ryan | Ballinascarthy | 1-07 | 10 | 4 | 2.50 |
| 6 | Martin O'Hanlon | Clyda Rovers | 0-10 | 10 | 4 | 2.50 |
| 8 | Dan O'Sullivan | Kilbrin | 0-09 | 9 | 2 | 4.50 |
| 9 | John Sheehan | Kilbrin | 2-02 | 8 | 2 | 4.00 |
| 9 | John Kingston | Ballinascarthy | 2-02 | 8 | 4 | 2.00 |

In a single game

| Rank | Player | Club | Tally | Total | Opposition |
|---|---|---|---|---|---|
| 1 | Seánie Noonan | Aghabullogue | 1-08 | 11 | Ballinascarthy |
| 2 | Liam Deasy | Ballinascarthy | 2-01 | 7 | Aghabullogue |
| 2 | Stephen O'Reilly | Kilbrin | 2-01 | 7 | Na Piarsaigh |
| 2 | John Sheehan | Kilbrin | 2-01 | 7 | Na Piarsaigh |
| 2 | Colman Murphy | Ballinascarthy | 0-07 | 7 | Aghabullogue |
| 6 | Paudie Curtin | Clyda Rovers | 2-00 | 6 | Kilbrin |
| 6 | Jerry Ryan | Ballinascarthy | 1-03 | 6 | Aghabullogue |
| 6 | Robert Dalton | Na Piarsaigh | 1-03 | 6 | Kilbrin |
| 6 | Colman Murphy | Ballinascarthy | 0-06 | 6 | Clyda Rovers |
| 10 | Timmy O'Callaghan | Clyda Rovers | 0-05 | 5 | Midleton |
| 10 | Robbie Fitzgerald | Midleton | 0-05 | 5 | Clyda Rovers |
| 10 | Dan O'Sullivan | Kilbrin | 0-05 | 5 | Clyda Rovers |
| 10 | Timmy O'Callaghan | Clyda Rovers | 0-05 | 5 | Ballinascarthy |
