= 1931 Cork Intermediate Football Championship =

Gaelic football competition

- Dates: 22 March – 6 September 1931
- Teams: 11
- Champions: Clonakilty (2nd title); D. O'Donovan (captain)
- Runners-up: Dromtarriffe; S. Green (captain)

Tournament statistics
- Matches played: 10
- Goals scored: 30 (3 per match)
- Points scored: 48 (4.8 per match)

The 1931 Cork Intermediate Football Championship was the 22nd staging of the Cork Intermediate Football Championship since its establishment by the Cork County Board in 1909. The draw for the opening round fixtures took place on 25 January 1931. The championship ran from 22 March to 6 September 1931.

The final was played on 6 September 1931 at the Mardyke in Cork, between Clonnakilty and Dromtarriffe, in what was their first ever meeting in the final. Clonakilty won the match by 3–06 to 0–02 to claim their second championship title overall and a first championship title in 18 years.

== Results ==
=== First round ===
22 March 1931 First round	Bandon	2-03 - 0-01	Kilmurry	St Mary's Park

22 March 1931 First round	Redmonds	w/o - scr.	St Joseph's	Cork Athletic Grounds

22 March 1931 First round	Éire Óg	0-00 - 8-07	Clonakilty	Kilmurry Grounds

12 April 1931 First round	St Nicholas'	4-02 - 1-03	St Patrick's	Riverstown Sportsfield

21 June 1931 First round	Dromtarriffe	1-02 - 1-02	St Finbarr's	Coachford Sportsgield

19 July 1931 First round replay	Dromtarriffe (awarded match)	1-02 - 1-02	St Finbarr's	Castle Grounds

- Ballinhassig received a bye in this round.

=== Second round ===
26 April 1931 Second round	Ballinhassig	0-00 - 2-02	Clonakilty	Innishannon Grounds

5 July 1931 Second round	Bandon	0-01 - 2-03	St Nicholas'	Bandon Athletic Grounds

- Dromtarriffe and Redmonds received byes in this round.

=== Semi-finals ===
9 August 1931 Semi-final	Redmonds	0-00 - 2-04	Dromtarriffe	Mallow Town Park

9 August 1931 Semi-final	Clonakilty	1-04 - 1-02	St Nicholas'	Bandon Athletic Grounds

=== Final ===
6 September 1931 Final	Clonakilty	3-06 - 0-02	Dromtarriffe	The Mardyke
