= Carbery Junior A Hurling Championship =

Hurling competition in Ireland

- Current season or competition: 2026 Carbery Junior A Hurling Championship
- Irish: Craobh Iomána Sóisear A Cairbre
- Code: Hurling
- Founded: 1925; 101 years ago
- Region: Carbery (GAA)
- Trophy: Flyer Nyhan Cup
- No. of teams: 12
- Title holders: Ballinascarthy (8th title)
- Most titles: Clonakilty (18 titles)
- Sponsors: RCM Tarmacadam
- Official website: Carbery GAA

The Carbery Junior A Hurling Championship (known for sponsorship reasons as the RCM Tarmacadam Carbery Junior A Hurling Championship) is an annual club hurling competition organised by the West Cork Board of the Gaelic Athletic Association and contested by the top-ranking junior clubs in West Cork, Ireland, deciding the competition winners through a group stage and knockout format. It is the most prestigious competition in West Cork hurling.

Introduced in 1925 as the West Cork Junior Championship, it was initially a straight knockout tournament. The competition went through a number of format changes since then, including the introduction of a back-door or second chance for beaten teams. The competition took on its current format in 2022, adding a round-robin group stage and limiting the number of entrants.

In its current format, the Carbery Junior Championship begins with a group stage in late summer. The 12 participating teams are divided into three groups of four and play each other in a round-robin system. The two top-ranking teams in each group proceed to the knockout phase that culminates with the final. The winner of the Carbery Junior Championship, as well as receiving the Flyer Nyhan Cup, also qualifies for the subsequent Cork Junior A Hurling Championship.

The competition has been won by 13 teams, 12 of which have won it more than once. Clonakilty are the most successful team in the tournament's history, having won it 18 times. Ballinascarthy are the title holders, defeating Kilbree by 0–22 to 1–16 in the 2025 final.

== Format ==
=== Group stage ===
The 12 teams are divided into three groups of four. Over the course of the group stage, each team plays once against the others in the group, resulting in each team being guaranteed at least three games. Two points are awarded for a win, one for a draw and zero for a loss. The teams are ranked in the group stage table by points gained, then scoring difference and then their head-to-head record. The top two teams in each group qualify for the knockout stage.

=== Knockout stage ===
Quarter-finals: Two lone quarter-finals featuring the four lowest-placed qualifying teams from the group stage. Two teams qualify for the next round.

Semi-finals: The two quarter-final winners and the top two highest-placed qualifying teams from the group stage contest this round. The two winners from these games advance to the final.

Final: The two semi-final winners contest the final. The winning team are declared champions.

=== Relegation ===
The two bottom-ranked teams from the group stage take part in a playoff, with the losing team being relegated to the Carbery Junior B Hurling Championship for the following season.

== Teams ==
=== 2026 Teams ===
The 12 teams competing in the 2026 Carbery Junior A Hurling Championship are:

Team	Location	Colours	Position in 2026	In championship since	Championship Titles	Last Championship Title
Ballinascarthy	Ballinascarthy	Red and white	Semi-finals	?	8	2025
Bandon	Bandon	Yellow and white	Semi-finals	2026	13	2009
Clonakilty	Clonakilty	Green and red	Group stage	?	18	2023
Diarmuid Ó Mathúna's	Castletown-Kinneigh	Blue and gold	Champions	?	7	2026
Dohenys	Dunmanway	Green and white	Quarter-finals	2007	4	2013
Kilbree	Rossmore	Blue and white	Quarter-finals	?	2	2018
Kilbrittain	Kilbrittain	Black and amber	Group stage	2025	12	1985
Newcestown	Newcestown	Red and yellow	Group stage	?	9	2014
Randal Óg	Dunmanway	Yellow and green	Group stage	2023	0	—
St Colum's	Kealkill	Black and orange	Group stage	2004	0	—
St James'	Ardfield	Green and gold	Group stage	2006	0	—
St Mary's	Enniskean	Black and gold	Runners-up	2017	0	—

== Qualification for subsequent competitions ==
The South West Junior Hurling Championship winners qualify for the subsequent Cork Junior A Hurling Championship. from 2017 to 2019, the South West finalists qualified for the county series.

== Trophy ==
The winning team is presented with the Flyer Nyhan Cup. A native of Clonakilty, John "Flyer" Nyhan (1892-1934) was a member of some excellent Clonakilty teams which contested the county middle grade hurling final in 1912, won the county intermediate football title in 1913 and then won the prestigious South Coast Railway Shields in both football and hurling in 1914. The cup was presented for the first time in 1961.

== Roll of honour ==
=== By club ===
#	Club	Titles	Runners-up	Championship wins	Championship runners-up
1	Clonakilty	18	8	1939, 1943, 1944, 1945, 1946, 1950, 1952, 1961, 1962, 1976, 1977, 1983, 2004, 2012, 2015, 2017, 2020, 2023	1926, 1947, 1949, 1954, 1955, 1979, 1980, 2009
2	Courcey Rovers	15	5	1947, 1948, 1951, 1953, 1954, 1955, 1956, 1957, 1964, 1965, 1966, 1968, 1970, 1973, 1974	1950, 1958, 1961, 1962, 1972
3	Bandon	13	9	1929, 1934, 1935, 1936, 1937, 1949, 1960, 1971, 1975, 1990, 1995, 1999, 2009	1932, 1940, 1941, 1968, 1969, 1984, 1991, 1997, 1998
4	Kilbrittain	12	14	1925, 1926, 1927, 1928, 1930, 1938, 1940, 1941, 1942, 1978, 1984, 1985	1929, 1931, 1933, 1939, 1957, 1959, 1965, 1973, 1976, 1977, 1981, 1982, 2002, 2005
5	Newcestown	9	8	1967, 1969, 1972, 1979, 1980, 1988, 1991, 1992, 2014	1963, 1964, 1970, 1989, 2003, 2004, 2007, 2022
6	Ballinascarthy	8	6	1989, 1997, 1998, 2000, 2019, 2021, 2022, 2025	1966, 1971, 2001, 2017, 2018, 2024
7	Barryroe	7	5	1981, 1982, 1986, 1987, 1994, 2006, 2007	1985, 1992, 1996, 1999, 2000
7	Diarmuid Ó Mathúna's	7	5	2001, 2002, 2005, 2008, 2010, 2024, 2026	1983, 1993, 2006, 2014, 2015
9	Dohenys	4	9	1958, 1959, 1963, 2013	1936, 1937, 1938, 1960, 1974, 1975, 2010, 2011, 2012
10	O'Donovan Rossa	3	8	1931, 1932, 1933	1928, 1943, 1944, 1945, 1946, 1948, 1956, 2008
10	Argideen Rangers	3	3	1993, 1996, 2003	1990, 1994, 1995
12	Kilbree	2	2	2016, 2018	2019, 2025
13	St Oliver Plunketts	1	0	2011	—
14	St Mary's	0	6	—	1942, 1978, 1987, 2020, 2021, 2026
14	St. Colum's	0	3	—	1986, 2013, 2016
14	Knockavilla	0	1	—	1927
14	Valley Rovers	0	1	—	1930
14	Timoleague	0	1	—	1934
14	Darrara	0	1	—	1935
14	Ballydehob	0	1	—	1951
14	Bantry Blues	0	1	—	1952
14	Ballineen	0	1	—	1953
14	Round Towers	0	1	—	1967
14	Randal Óg	0	1	—	1988
14	St James'	0	1	—	2023

== List of finals ==
=== List of Carbery JAHC finals ===
Year	Winners		Runners-up		#
Year	Club	Score	Club	Score	#
2026	Diarmuid Ó Mathúna's	0-15	St Mary's	0-13	
2025	Ballinascarthy	0-22	Kilbree	1-16	
2024	Diarmuid Ó Mathúna's	1-14	Ballinascarthy	1-12	
2023	Clonakilty	1-17	St James'	0-11	
2022	Ballinascarthy	1-25	Newcestown	1-11	
2021	Ballinascarthy	0-22	St. Mary's	0-14	
2020	Clonakilty	2-17	St. Mary's	0-19	
2019	Ballinascarthy	2-18	Kilbree	1-11	
2018	Kilbree	1-18	Ballinascarthy	2-12	
2017	Clonakilty	2-21	Ballinascarthy	1-16	
2016	Kilbree	3-07	St. Colum's	0-12	
2015	Clonakilty	4-14	Diarmuid Ó Mathúna's	0-08	
2014	Newcestown	0-16	Diarmuid Ó Mathúna's	0-10	
2013	Dohenys	4-09	St. Colum's	1-09	
2012	Clonakilty	3-13	Dohenys	2-14	
2011	St. Oliver Plunketts	2-15	Dohenys	0-12	
2010	Diarmuid Ó Mathúna's	3-12	Dohenys	1-15	
2009	Bandon	1-10	Clonakilty	1-09	
2008	Diarmuid Ó Mathúna's	0-09	O'Donovan Rossa	0-07	
2007	Barryroe	3-12	Newcestown	0-06	
2006	Barryroe	0-16	Diarmuid Ó Mathúna's	2-05	
2005	Diarmuid Ó Mathúna's	0-11	Kilbrittain	0-08	
2004	Clonakilty	1-11	Newcestown	1-08	
2003	Argideen Rangers	0-13	Newcestown	1-06	
2002	Diarmuid Ó Mathúna's	1-09	Kilbrittain	0-07	
2001	Diarmuid Ó Mathúna's	0-15	Ballinascarthy	0-05	
2000	Ballinascarthy	0-12	Barryroe	0-09	
1999	Bandon	0-17	Barryroe	1-12	
1998	Ballinascarthy	6-07	Bandon	1-10	
1997	Ballinascarthy	0-15	Bandon	0-10	
1996	Argideen Rangers	3-14	Barryroe	2-15	
1995	Bandon	4-07	Argideen Rangers	1-15	
1994	Barryroe	2-08	Argideen Rangers	2-04	
1993	Argideen Rangers	2-07	Diarmuid Ó Mathúna's	0-08	
1992	Newcestown	0-12	Barryroe	0-06	
1991	Newcestown	2-10	Bandon	4-03	
1990	Bandon	1-08	Argideen Rangers	0-10	
1989	Ballinascarthy	1-09	Newcestown	0-07	
1988	Newcestown	3-10	Randal Óg	1-04	
1987	Barryroe	1-11	St. Mary's	1-04	
1986	Barryroe	1-10	St. Colum's	0-03	
1985	Kilbrittain	3-16	Barryroe	1-05	
1984	Kilbrittain	2-12	Barryroe	0-08	
1983	Clonakilty	3-09	Diarmuid Ó Mathúna's	2-10	
1982	Barryroe	2-09	Kilbrittain	2-04	
1981	Barryroe	5-04	Kilbrittain	1-05	
1980	Newcestown	2-16	Clonakilty	1-11	
1979	Newcestown	2-08	Clonakilty	2-04	
1978	Kilbrittain	3-13	St. Mary's	2-04	
1977	Clonakilty	1-11	Kilbrittain	2-05	
1976	Clonakilty	2-09	Kilbrittain	2-05	
1975	Bandon	6-08	Dohenys	1-06	
1974	Courcey Rovers	6-11	Dohenys	1-04	
1973	Courcey Rovers	1-11	Kilbrittain	0-05	
1972	Newcestown	5-07	Courcey Rovers	2-04	
1971	Bandon	3-13	Ballinascarthy	2-05	
1970	Courcey Rovers	3-06	Newcestown	0-09	
1969	Newcestown	2-09	Bandon	2-08	
1968	Courcey Rovers	1-09	Bandon	1-06	
1967	Newcestown	3-06	Round Towers	1-04	
1966	Courcey Rovers	5-11	Ballinascarthy	1-04	
1965	Courcey Rovers	4-10	Kilbrittain	1-06	
1964	Courcey Rovers	3-06	Newcestown	2-03	
1963	Dohenys	3-06	Newcestown	2-07	
1962	Clonakilty	5-03	Courcey Rovers	4-05	
1961	Clonakilty	6-08	Courcey Rovers	6-01	
1960	Bandon	4-09	Dohenys	1-02	
1959	Dohenys	4-09	Kilbrittain	0-01	
1958	Dohenys	4-03	Courcey Rovers	3-03	
1957	Courcey Rovers	6-05	Kilbrittain	3-03	
1956	Courcey Rovers	6-05	O'Donovan Rossa	2-04	
1955	Courcey Rovers	3-02	Clonakilty	3-01	
1954	Courcey Rovers	w/o	Clonakilty	scr.	
1953	Courcey Rovers	4-07	Ballineen	3-03	
1952	Clonakilty	2-07	Bantry Blues	2-05	
1951	Courcey Rovers	3-03	Ballydehob	3-05	
1950	Clonakilty	6-04	Courcey Rovers	3-02	
1949	Bandon	3-07	Clonakilty	1-04	
1948	Courcey Rovers	9-00	Skibbereen	2-01	
1947	Courcey Rovers	8-03	Clonakilty	3-02	
1946	Clonakilty	9-08	Skibbereen	0-03	
1945	Clonakilty	8-04	Skibbereen	3-01	
1944	Clonakilty	3-03	Skibbereen	2-02	
1943	Clonakilty	4-04	Skibbereen	1-01	
1942	Kilbrittain	3-03	St. Mary's	2-04	
1941	Kilbrittain		Bandon		
1940	Kilbrittain	5-00	Bandon	1-00	
1939	Clonakilty	8-01	Kilbrittain	2-01	
1938	Kilbrittain	4-07	Dohenys	2-04	
1937	Bandon	1-05	Dohenys	2-01	
1936	Bandon	9-04	Dohenys	2-01	
1935	Bandon	6-01	Darrara	4-02	
1934	Bandon	3-05	Timoleague	4-05	
1933	Skibbereen	7-02	Kilbrittain	0-01	
1932	Skibbereen	5-05	Bandon	2-03	
1931	Skibbereen	1-06	Kilbrittain	1-01	
1930	Kilbrittain	2-07	Valley Rovers	2-03	
1929	Bandon	6-01	Kilbrittain	4-02	
1928	Kilbrittain	5-02	Skibbereen	1-04	
1927	Kilbrittain	7-01	Knockavilla	1-01	
1926	Kilbrittain	3-04	Clonakilty	1-01	
1925	Kilbrittain				

=== Notes ===
- 1928 - An objection by Kilbrittain was upheld and a replay was ordered.
- 1940 - The first match ended in a draw: Kilbrittain 2-07, Bandon 3-04.
- 1951 - An objection by Courcey Rovers was upheld and they were awarded the title.
- 1982 - The first match ended in a draw: Barryroe 2-10, Kilbrittain 3-07.
- 1983 - The first match ended in a draw: Clonakilty 1-05, Diarmuid Ó Mathúna's 1-05.
- 1990 - The first match ended in a draw: Bandon 1-08, Argideen Rangers 0-11.
- 1999 - The first match ended in a draw: Bandon 2-21, Barryroe 6-09.
- 2000 - The first match ended in a draw: Ballinascarthy 1-13, Barryroe 2-10.
- 2001 - The first match ended in a draw: Diarmuid Ó Mathúna's 0-15, Kilbrittain 2-09.
- 2005 - The first match ended in a draw: Diarmuid Ó Mathúna's 0-14, Kilbrittain 3-05.
- 2006 - The first match ended in a draw: Barryroe 1-08, Diarmuid Ó Mathúna's 1-08.
- 2012 - The match ended in a draw and extra-time was played.
- 2024 - The first match ended in a draw: Ballinascarthy 0-13, Diarmuid Ó Mathúna's 0-13.

== Records ==
=== By decade ===
The most successful team of each decade, judged by number of South West Junior Hurling Championship titles, is as follows:

- 1920s: 4 for Kilbrittain (1925-26-27-28)
- 1930s: 4 for Bandon (1934-35-36-37)
- 1940s: 2 for Clonakilty (1943-44-45-46)
- 1950s: 6 for Courcey Rovers (1951-53-54-55-56-57)
- 1960s: 4 for Courcey Rovers (1964-65-66-68)
- 1970s: 3 for Courcey Rovers (1970-73-74)
- 1980s: 4 for Barryroe (1981-82-86-87)
- 1990s: 3 for Bandon (1990-95-99)
- 2000s: 3 for Diarmuid Ó Mathúna's (2001-02-05-08)
- 2010s: 3 for Clonakilty (2012-15-17)

=== Gaps ===
Top five longest gaps between successive championship titles:

- 50 years: Dohenys (1963-2013)
- 36 years: Kilbrittain (1942-1978)
- 22 years: Newcestown (1992-2014)
- 21 years: Clonakilty (1983-2004)
- 19 years: Ballinascarthy (2000-2019)

== Winners and finalists ==
=== The Double ===
Five teams have won the South West Junior Hurling Championship and the South West Junior Football Championship in a single year as part of a hurling-Gaelic football double. Kilbrittain became the first team to win the double in 1926. Bandon are the record holders having claimed the double on four occasions - 1929, 1960, 1971 and 1975. Dohenys are the only club to have won a back-to-back double - 1958 and 1959. Newcestown (1967) and Clonakilty (1977) complete the list of double-winning teams.

Club sides Argideen Rangers, Ballinascarthy and O'Donovan Rossa also hold the distinction of being dual divisional junior championship-winning teams, however, these were not achieved in a single calendar season.

== See also ==
- Carbery Junior A Football Championship
