= Belgooly GAA =

Gaelic games club in County Cork, Ireland

Belgooly
- Béal Guala
- Founded: 1972
- County: Cork
- Colours
- Grounds: Belgooly GAA Grounds

Playing kits
Standard colours

Senior Club Championships
	All Ireland	Munster champions	Cork champions
Football:	0	0	0
Hurling:	0	0	0

Belgooly GAA is a Gaelic Athletic Association club in Belgooly, County Cork, Ireland. The club is affiliated to the Carrigdhoun Board and the Cork County Board and fields teams in hurling and Gaelic football.

== History ==
Located in the village of Belgooly, about 4.6 km north of Kinsale, Belgooly GAA Club was founded in 1972, however, Gaelic games have been played in the area since the early years of the Gaelic Athletic Association. An underage amalgamation with Ballymartle, known as Sliabh Rua, predated the formation of the club and existed until 2026. Belgooly has spent its entire existence operating in the junior grades.

Belgooly had its first major success in 2011, when the club claimed the Cork JBFC title following a 2–14 to 1–08 win over Charleville in the final. This was followed two years later with a first ever South East JAFC title. A decade later in 2021, Belgooly had its most successful hurling year when the club secured a Cork JBHC double with defeats of Newtownshandrum and Randal Óg.

Two years later, the club won its first ever South East JAHC title, following a 5–17 to 2–14 win over Valley Rovers in the final. A second such title was won in 2025, after a defeat of Kinsale.

== Honours ==
- Cork Junior B Football Championship (1): 2011
- Cork Junior B Hurling Championship (1): 2021
- Cork Junior B Inter-Divisional Hurling Championship (1): 2021
- South East Junior A Hurling Championship (2): 2023, 2025
- South East Junior A Football Championship (1): 2013
