= Ardfield =

Village in County Cork, Ireland

Ardfield Ard Ó bhFicheallaigh
- Village
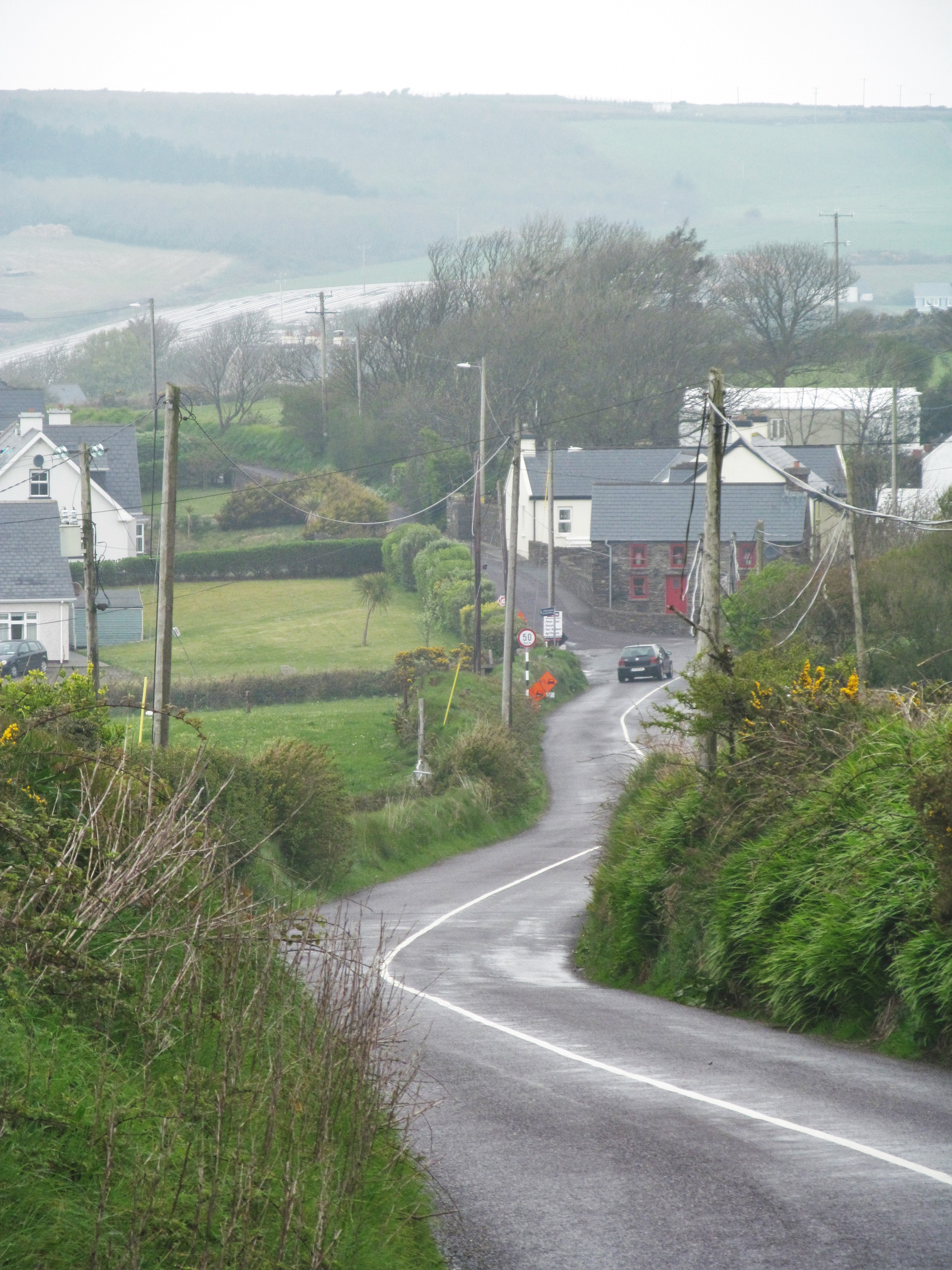
- Road from Red Strand to Ardfield

- Location in Ireland
- Coordinates: 51°34′N 8°55′W
- Country: Ireland
- Province: Munster
- County: County Cork
- Irish grid reference: W369352

Ardfield (Irish: Ard Ó bhFicheallaigh, meaning 'height of the Feelys'), historically Ardofoyle, is a small village and civil parish on the south-west coast of County Cork, Ireland. It lies 8 kilometres south of Clonakilty and 11 kilometres east of Rosscarbery, near Galley Head. Ardfield's Roman Catholic church dates to 1832 and is within the ecclesiastical parish of Ardfield/Rathbarry.

Ardfield is home to St James' GAA Club, which fields both hurling and Gaelic football teams. Local amenities include the local Roman Catholic church, a school, a pub, Ardfield Creamery, a children's playground and two all-weather tennis courts.

The village is located near several beaches, including Red Strand and Long Strand.

== See also ==
- List of towns and villages in Ireland
