= Oliver Plunketts GAA =

GAA club in County Cork, Ireland

St. Oliver Plunkett's GAA
- Naomh Oilibhéar Pluincéad
- Founded: 1974
- County: Cork
- Colours: Black and White
- Grounds: Páirc Uinsinn
- Coordinates: 51°42′35.58″N 8°53′49.35″W

Playing kits
Standard colours

St. Oliver Plunkett's is a Gaelic Athletic Association club in County Cork, Ireland. The club is based in Ahiohill. It fields teams in hurling and Gaelic football competitions organized by Cork GAA and the Carbery divisional board.

== History ==
The club was founded in 1974, and named after Saint Oliver Plunkett whose canonization was announced that year. This was not the first club in Ahiohill and there are records of games played by Ahiohill as early as the famine in 1840s. The underage club was known as Assumption Rovers. On 28 August 2011, Plunketts won their first West Cork Junior A Hurling Championship beating Dohenys in the Final with a score of 2-15 to 0-12. Kevin Coffey was Man of the Match scoring 8 points.

== Honours ==
- Munster Junior B Football Championship Runners-Up 2024
- Cork Junior B Hurling Championship Winner (2) 2002, 2023 Runner-Up 1999
- Cork Junior B Football Championship Winner (1) 1990, 2007, 2023
- Cork Minor C Football Championship Runner-Up 1999
- Cork Minor C Hurling Championship Winner (3) 2002, 2004, 2006
- West Cork Junior A Hurling Championship Winner (1) 2011
- West Cork Junior A Football Championship Runner-Up 2009, 2012
- West Cork Junior B Hurling Championship Winner (4) 1990, 1997, 1999, 2002 Runner-Up 1988, 1992, 1994, 1995, 1996
- West Cork Junior B Football Championship Winner (3) 1986, 1990, 2007 Runner-Up 1978, 1979, 1998, 2006
- West Cork Junior C Hurling Championship Winner (2) 1988, 1995
- West Cork Minor B Football Championship Runner-Up 1985 (Assumption Rovers)
- West Cork Minor C Hurling Championship Winner (3) 2002, 2004, 2006
- West Cork Minor C Football Championship Winner (2) 1999, 2002 Runner-Up 1997, 2005
- West Cork Under-21 B Hurling Championship Winner (1) 2005 Runner-Up 1988, 1990, 2003
- West Cork Under-21 B Football Championship Winner (1) 2009 Runner-Up 1988
- West Cork Under-21 B Hurling Championship Winner (3) 1996, 2001, 2002 Runner-Up 2000
- West Cork Under-21 C Football Championship Winner (1) 2002 Runner-Up 1997, 1998, 2000, 2001, 2012
