= Clonakilty GAA =

Gaelic sports club in County Cork, Ireland

- Cloch na gCoillte
- Founded: 1887
- County: Cork
- Nickname: The Brewery Town
- Colours
- Grounds: Ahamilla GAA Complex
- Coordinates: 51°37′09.18″N 8°55′38.16″W

Playing kits
Standard colours

Senior Club Championships
| | All Ireland | Munster champions | Cork champions |
|---|---|---|---|
| Football: | 0 | 0 | 9 |

Clonakilty GAA is a Gaelic Athletic Association club in Clonakilty, County Cork, Ireland. The club is affiliated to the West Cork Board and fields teams in Gaelic football, hurling and camogie.

== History ==
Located in the town of Clonakilty in West Cork, Clonakilty GAA Club was formally affiliated to the newly established Gaelic Athletic Association in October 1887. The new club's first recorded match was against Carbery Rangers in February 1888. Clonakilty GAA Club celebrated its silver jubilee by winning the Cork IFC title in 1913.

Clonakilty won the Southwest JAFC title in 1930, before later claiming the Cork JFC title, after a defeat of Ballincollig in the final. This was immediately followed in 1931 by the club claiming their second Cork IFC title and promotion to senior level. Clonakilty has remained a senior club ever since then.

Clonakilty's first seven seasons in the Cork SFC resulted in six final defeats between 1932 and 1938. The club finally claimed the title in 1939, following a 0–07 to 0–05 defeat of Beara. That year the club also claimed the first of a record 18 Southwest JAHC titles. This was followed by three successive Cork SFC successes between 1942 and 1944. Such was the dominance of Clonakilty at the time, the Cork team that won the 1945 All-Ireland SFC title featured five Clon players on the starting team and four players amongst the reserves. After being beaten by Fermoy for a fourth successive Cork SFC title, Clonakilty returned to win consecutive titles in 1946 and 1947. The club rounded off its greatest era in 1952 by winning their seventh Cork SFC after a defeat of Collins.

After the high point of the 1940s, Clonakilty went into a period of decline. In spite of this, the club contested Cork SFC finals in 1961, 1968, 1983 and 1985 but faced defeat on each occasion. Clonakilty finally claimed their eighth Cork SFC title when, in 1996, they beat University College Cork in the final by 1–09 to 0–10. Their ninth and most recent Cork SFC title was secured in 2009, following a 1–13 to 1–12 defeat of St Finbarr's in the final.

== Honours ==
- Cork Senior Football Championship (9)
  - 1939, 1942, 1943, 1944, 1946, 1947, 1952, 1996, 2009
- Cork Intermediate Football Championship (2)
  - 1913, 1931
- Cork Junior Football Championship (1)
  - 1930
- Cork Junior Hurling Championship
  - Runners-up 1946
- Cork Middle Grade Hurling Championship
  - Runners-up 1912
- Cork Under-21 Football Championship
  - Runners-up 1999, 2013
- Cork Minor Football Championship
  - Runners-up 1940, 1962
- Cork Premier 2 Minor Football Championship
  - 2013, 2015
- Cork Minor A Hurling Championship (1)
  - Winners 2013
- Cork Minor B Hurling Championship
  - Winners 2007
- Cork Under-16A Hurling Championship
  - Winners 2013
- Cork Under-16A Hurling League
  - Winners 2013
- West Cork Senior Football Championship (2)
  - 1892, 1893
- Carbery Junior A Hurling Championship (18)
  - Winners 1939, 1943, 1944, 1945, 1946, 1950, 1952, 1961, 1962, 1976, 1977, 1983, 2004, 2012, 2015, 2017, 2020, 2023
  - Runners-up 1926, 1947, 1949, 1954, 1955, 1979, 1980, 2009
- West Cork Middle Hurling Championship
  - Winners 1912
- West Cork Junior C Hurling Championship
  - Winners 2013
- West Cork Junior C Hurling League
  - Winners 2013
- Carbery Junior A Football Championship (4)
  - Winners 1930, 1948, 1949, 1977 Runners-up 1926, 1929, 1972, 1974
- West Cork Under-21 Football Championship (4)
  - Winners 1996, 1999, 2013, 2014, 2015
- West Cork Minor A Hurling Championship (2)
  - 2013, 2025
- West Cork Minor B Hurling Championship
  - Winners 2007
  - Runners-up 2019
- Cork Intermediate Camogie Championship
  - Winners 2009
- Cork Junior A Ladies Football Championship
  - Winners 2009
- Munster Junior A Ladies Football Championship
  - Winners 2009
- All-Ireland Junior A Ladies Football Championship
  - Winners 2009
- Clonakilty and Timoleague Tournaments
  - Winners 1892
- West Cork Railway Shields Football and Hurling
  - Winners 1914
- Cork Minor A Football Championship
  - Winners 2018
- West Cork Minor A Football Championship
  - Winners 2018
- Cork County Minor A League
  - Winners 2018

== Notable players ==
- Tadhgo Crowley: All-Ireland SFC-winner (1945).
- Kevin Dillon: Munster SFC-winner (1966, 1967)
- Mick Finn: All-Ireland SFC-winner (1945).
- Pat Griffin: All-Ireland SFC-winner (1969, 1970).
- Flor Hayes: Munster SFC-winner (1966, 1967)
- Dave McCarthy: All-Ireland SFC-winner (1973).
- Eoin O'Mahony: All-Ireland SFC-winner (1989).
- Humphrey O'Neill: All-Ireland SFC-winner (1945).
- Maurice Shanley: All-Ireland U20FC-winner (2019).
