= St Colum's GAA =

Gaelic sports club in County Cork, Ireland

St Colum's
- Founded: 1970
- County: Cork
- Colours: Black and Orange
- Grounds: Kealkill
- Coordinates: 51°44′35.07″N 9°24′43.88″W

Playing kits
Standard colours

St Colum's is a Gaelic Athletic Association junior A club in both hurling and football in the Carbery division, located in Treanamadaree, County Cork, Ireland.

== History ==
The club was formed in 1970 to facilitate Gaelic Athletic Association for people living in the Kealkill area (e.g. Cappabue, Carriganass, Borlin, Ardnagashel, Coomhola etc.) instead of travelling to clubs further away like Bantry Blues, Glengariff, Dohenys, Ballingeary etc. The club was founded by Fr John McCarthy (a native of Newcestown) who was appointed curate to Kealkil in 1970. The first meeting of the club was held in Coomhola National School on 8 December 1970. In 1971, the club entered teams in all grades open to it, and in the very first year reached the final of the West Cork Junior B Hurling Championship, only to be beaten after a replay by Bandon on the first Sunday in January 1972. St Colum's Camogie Club was formed on 27 April 2009.

== Roll of honour ==
In 1997, St Colum's defeated Glengariff in Bantry to win the Junior B county title and move into Junior A. In 2003, St Colum's defeated Lisgoold to win the Cork Junior Hurling Championship. In 2013, the club's junior footballers defeated Caheragh to win the West Cork Final for the first time. They subsequently reached the county final but were narrowly defeated by Mitchelstown. 2013 also saw the hurlers reaching the hurling decider in Carbery losing to Dohenys.

- Cork Junior Football Championship (0): runner-up 2013
- Cork Junior B Hurling Championship (1): 2003
- Cork Junior B Football Championship (1): 1997
- Cork Minor C Football Championship (2): 2018,2019
- South West Junior A Football Championship (1): 2013
- South West Junior A Hurling Championship (0): Runner-Up 1986, 2013, 2016
- West Cork Junior B Hurling Championship (3): 1982, 1994, 2003
- West Cork Junior B Football Championship (3): 1985, 1996, 1997
- West Cork Junior C Football Championship (4): 2006, 2007, 2016, 2017
- West Cork Junior D Football Championship (1): 2001
- West Cork Minor A Hurling Championship (1): 1980
- West Cork Minor B Hurling Championship (5): 1973, 1974, 1975, 2000, 2001
- West Cork Minor C Football Championship (1): 2018
- West Cork Minor C Hurling Championship (3): 2007, 2009, 2010
- West Cork Under-21 B Hurling Championship (6): 1974, 1975, 1979, 1994, 1996, 2001
- West Cork Under-21 B Football Championship (6): 1972, 1974, 1975, 1995, 2025, 2026
- West Cork Under-21 C Football Championship (3): 2007, 2013, 2023

== Notable players ==
- Alan O'Connor
