= St James' GAA (Cork) =

GAA club in Cork, Ireland

- CLG Naomh Séamus
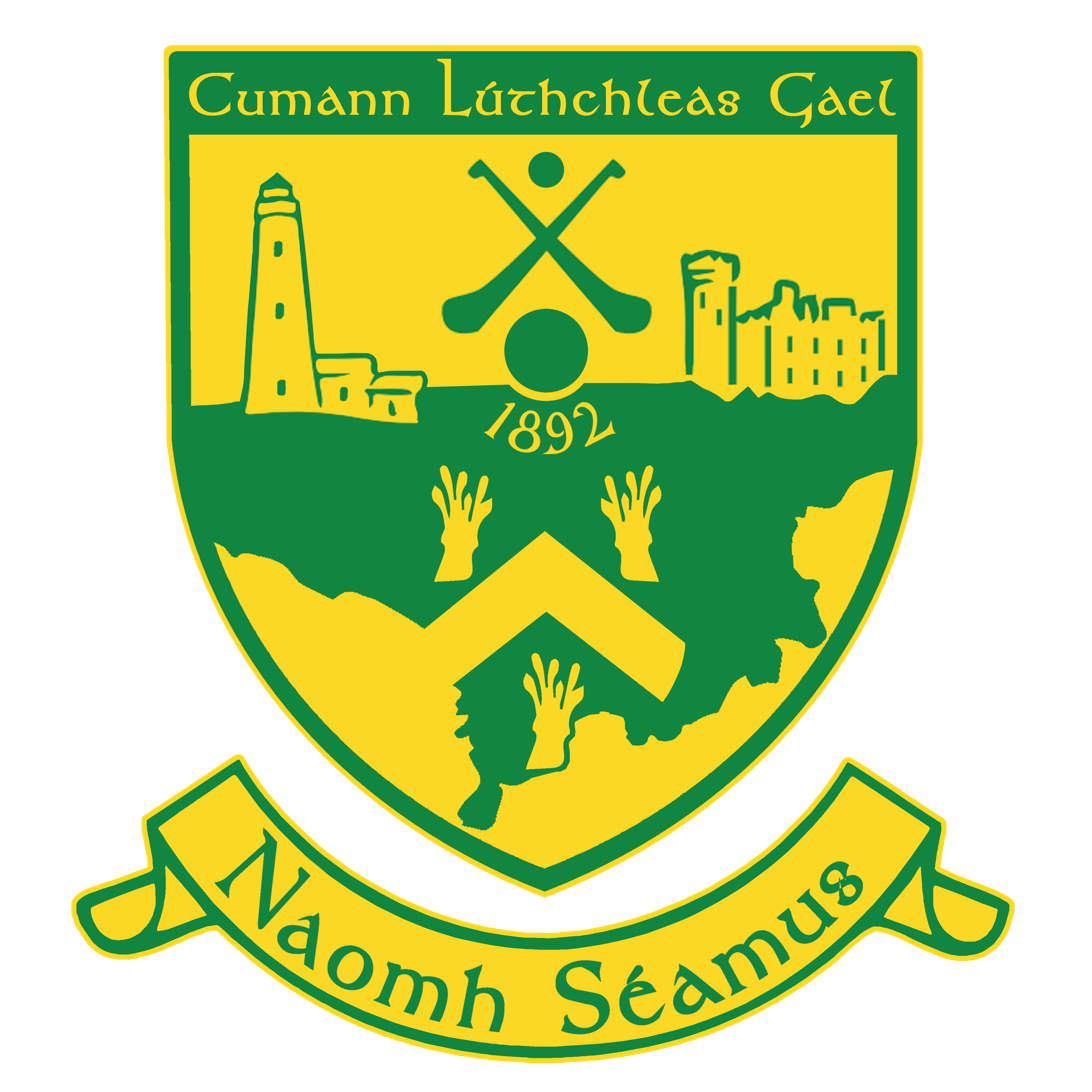
- Founded: 1892
- County: Cork
- Nickname: The Saints, The Mountain
- Colours: Green and Gold
- Grounds: St James' Park, Ardfield
- Coordinates: P85 N766

Playing kits
Standard colours

St James' GAA (Cork) is a Gaelic Athletic Association club based in the parish of Ardfield–Rathbarry, in County Cork, Ireland. The club has both hurling and Gaelic football teams. The club is part of Cork GAA and also part of the Carbery GAA division. Whilst the club has traditionally been primarily a Gaelic football one, hurling has grown in the 21st century. The club, like the parish has often been nicknamed "the Mountain". They are competitive in both Junior 'A' codes in the division.

St James' won the Carbery Junior A Football championship in 2019 after defeating Ballinascarthy 0–11 to 0–9 in the final. It was their first ever title at this grade.

St James' reached their first ever Junior A County Football Final in 2019, beating Cobh in Round 1 (2.17 to 0.02), beating Boherbue in the quarter-final (1.11 to 0.12) and beating St. Michael's in the semi-final (1.12 to 0.09) but lost out in the final to Kilshannig GAA (0-22 - 0–11)

== Achievements ==
- Cork Junior Football Championship Runner's up 2019
- South West Junior A Football Championship Winners (2) 2019, 2022
- All-Ireland Junior B Club Hurling Championship Runners-up 2005
- Munster Junior B Club Hurling Championship Winners (1) 2005
- Cork Junior B Hurling Championship Winners (1) 2005
- South West Cork Junior B Hurling Championship Winners (1) 2005
- South West Cork Junior B Football Championship Winners (5) 1929, 1946, 1948, 1981, 2005 Runners-Up 1968, 1970, 1975, 1997
- South West Cork Junior C Football Championship Winners (1) 2021
- South West Cork Junior D Football Championship Winners (1) 2009 Runners-Up 2001, 2006
- South West Cork Minor C Hurling Championship Winners (2) 1996, 2001 Runners-Up 2004, 2007, 2008, 2009
- South West Cork Minor C Football Championship Winners (3) 1995, 2000, 2006
- South West Cork Under-21 B Hurling Championship Winners (1) 2002 Runners-Up 2000
- South West Cork Under-21 B Football Championship Winners (1) 2005 Runners-Up 2008
- South West Cork Under-21 C Football Championship Winners (1) 1995 Runners-Up 2014
- South West Cork Under-21 C Hurling Championship Winners (1) 1998

== External sources ==
St James' club website
