= Kilbree GAA =

GAA club in County Cork

Kilbree
- Cilbrí
- Founded: 1888
- County: Cork
- Nickname: Super Blues
- Colours: Blue with White trim
- Grounds: Rossmore, Clonakilty, County Cork
- Coordinates: 51°40′15.32″N 8°59′42.28″W

Playing kits
Standard colours

Kilbree are a Junior A hurling club from the south-west division (Carbery GAA) of County Cork, Ireland. Their sister club in Gaelic football is Kilmeen which competes at Junior A level. The club participates in Carbery and Cork competitions.

== Honours ==
- Cork Junior B Hurling Championship Winners (1) 1984
- West Cork Junior A Hurling Championship: Winners (2) 2016, 2018
- West Cork Junior A Hurling League Winners (2) 2008,2018, 2021
- West Cork Junior B Hurling Championship Winners: (3) 1975, 1984, 2006
- West Cork Junior C Hurling Championship: Winners (3) 1994,2018, 2006 Runners-Up: 1992, 1997
- West Cork Minor C Hurling Championship: Winners (1) 1994 Runners-Up: 1997, 2003, 2005, 2011
- West Cork Under-21 A Hurling Championship: Runners-Up: 1985
- West Cork Under-21 B Hurling Championship: Winners (5) 1978, 1982, 1984, 2009, 2016 Runners-Up: 1979, 1980, 1989, 1994, 1998
- West Cork Under-21 C Hurling Championship: Runners-Up: 2001
- West Cork Minor B Hurling Championship: Winners (1) 2008
- West Region Minor B Hurling Championship: Winners (1) 2014
- Cork Minor B Hurling Championship: Winners: 2014 Runners-Up 2008
