= Newcestown GAA =

Gaelic games club in County Cork, Ireland

Newcestown
- Baile Nuis
- Founded: 1958
- County: Cork
- Colours
- Grounds: Páirc Naomh Eoin
- Coordinates: 51°46′51.89″N 8°51′49.19″W

Playing kits
Standard colours

Newcestown GAA is a Gaelic Athletic Association club in Newcestown, County Cork, Ireland. The club is affiliated to the West Cork Board and fields teams in both hurling and Gaelic football.

== History ==
Located in the village of Newcestown, about 8 miles from Bandon, Newcestown GAA Club was founded on 17 December 1958 and played its first game, against Kilmeen, in the spring of 1959. Success came immediately, with the club winning several divisional titles in both hurling and Gaelic football throughout the 1960s. Newcestown's second Southwest JFC title in 1967 was subsequently converted into a Cork JFC title after a defeat of Midlton in the final. The club secured senior status for the first time after winning the Cork IFC title in 1971.

Newcestown claimed the first of three Cork JHC titles in 1972, with further titles being claimed in 1980 and 1992. The club began the new century by winning a second Cork IFC title after a defeat of Nemo Rangers in 2001. This was followed by claiming the Cork PIFC title in 2010 and a return to the top flight. Newcestown added the Cork PIHC title in 2015 and became a dual senior club for the first time in their history. In 2023, Newcestown completed a SAHC-SAFC double after respective defeats of Blarney and Dohenys.

== Grounds ==
Newcestown's home ground is Páirc Naomh Eoin. The official opening took place in May 1985.

== Honours ==
- Cork Senior A Hurling Championship (1): 2023
- Cork Senior A Football Championship (1): 2023
- Cork Premier Intermediate Hurling Championship (1): 2015
- Cork Premier Intermediate Football Championship (1): 2010
- Cork Intermediate Football Championship (2): 1971, 2001
- Cork Junior Hurling Championship (3): 1972, 1980, 1992
- Cork Junior Football Championship (2): 1967, 1990
- Cork Under-21 Hurling Championship (1): 1993
- Cork Under-21 B Football Championship (1): 2019
- Cork Minor A Hurling Championship (2): 2019, 2012
- Cork Minor A Football Championship (1): 2019, 2012
- Cork Intermediate Hurling League (2): 2002, 2011
- Cork Minor A Hurling League (1): 2007
- Cork Minor A Football League (1): 2007
- Tom Creedon Cup (1): 2006
- Cork Minor Non Exam Hurling Championship (1): 2016
- South West Junior A Hurling Championship (9): 1967, 1969, 1972, 1979, 1980, 1988, 1991, 1992, 2014
- South West Junior A Football Championship (4): 1964, 1967, 1988, 1990
- West Cork Junior B Hurling Championship (1): 1977
- West Cork Junior B Football Championship (2): 1960, 2008
- West Cork Junior C Hurling Championship (6): 1984, 1985, 1990, 2000, 2003, 2005
- West Cork Junior C Football Championship (5): 1982, 1990, 1992, 1999, 2000
- West Cork Under-21 A Hurling Championship (25): 1973, 1989, 1991, 1992, 1993, 1994, 1995, 1997, 1998, 2000, 2008, 2009, 2010, 2011, 2013, 2014, 2016, 2017, 2018, 2019, 2020, 2021, 2022, 2023, 2024
- West Cork Under 21 A Football Championship (7): 2001, 2006, 2010, 2017, 2018, 2023
- West Cork Under-21 B Football Championship (2): 2000, 2019
- West Cork Minor A Hurling Championship (9): 1990, 1991, 1994, 1996, 1997, 1998, 2005, 2007
- West Cork Minor A Football Championship (2): 2000, 2019
- West Cork Minor B Hurling Championship (1): 2016
- West Cork Minor B Football Championship (2): 1969, 1981

== Notable players ==
- Tim Crowley: All-Ireland SHC-winner (1977, 1978, 1984)
- Kevin Kehily: Munster SHC-winner (1971, 1974, 1983)
- Pat Kenneally: All-Ireland SHC-winner (1990)
- Luke Meade: Munster SHC-winner (2017, 2018, 2025)
