= Diarmuid Ó Mathúna's GAA =

Gaelic games club in County Cork, Ireland

Diarmuid Ó Mathúna's
- Diarmuid Ó Mathúna’s
- Founded: 1968
- County: Cork
- Nickname: The Maw Maws
- Colours
- Grounds: Páirc Diarmuid Ó Mathúna
- Coordinates: 51°46′22.16″N 8°58′22.88″W

Playing kits
Standard colours

Diarmuid Ó Mathúna's is a Gaelic Athletic Association club in Castletown-Kinneigh, County Cork, Ireland. The club is affiliated to the Carbery Board and the Cork County Board and fields teams in Gaelic football and hurling.

== History ==
Located in the Castletown-Kinneigh and Coppeen areas near Ballineen in West Cork, Diarmuid Ó Mathúna's GAA Club was founded in 1968. The club is named after Jeremiah O’Mahony, a local who took part in the War of Independence and was accidentally killed in March 1921.

Diarmuid Ó Mathúna's has spent it's entire existence operating in the junior grades, having first fielded teams in 1969. The club's first major success came in 1974, with the winning of the South West JBHC title. A second such title followed in 1981. Diarmuid Ó Mathúna's won the South West JBFC in 1995, a title that subsequently yielded the Cork JBFC title, following a 2–09 to 2–05 win over Kilworth.

The first decade of the 21st century saw Diarmuid Ó Mathúna's win five Carbery JAHC titles between 2001 and 2008. The club later lost the 2008 Cork JAHC final to Dripsey. Diarmuid Ó Mathúna's won a second Cork JBFC title in 2012, before claiming further Carbery JAHC titles in 2024 and 2026.

== Honours ==
- Carbery Junior A Hurling Championship (7): 2001, 2002, 2005, 2008, 2010, 2024, 2026
- Cork Junior B Football Championship (2): 1995, 2012
- Carbery Junior B Football Championship (1): 1995
- Carbery Junior B Hurling Championship (2): 1974, 1981
- Carbery Junior C Hurling Championship (2): 1998, 2001
- Carbery Junior D Football Championship (2): 1989, 2017
- Carbery Under-21 Hurling Championship (2): 2002, 2003
- Carbery Under-21 B Hurling Championship (2): 1985, 1992, 2015
- Carbery Under-21 C Hurling Championship (1): 2013
- Carbery Under-21 C Football Championship (2): 2005, 2008
- Cork Minor A Hurling Championship (1): 2000
- Carbery Minor A Hurling Championship (2): 1999, 2000
- Carbery Minor B Hurling Championship (2): 1987, 1992, 1995
