= Ballinascarthy GAA =

Gaelic games club in County Cork, Ireland

Ballinascarthy
- Béal na Scairte
- Founded: 1945
- County: Cork
- Nickname: Bal
- Colours
- Grounds: Henry Ford Park
- Coordinates: 51°40′08.61″N 8°51′03.15″W

Playing kits
Standard colours

Ballinascarthy GAA is a Gaelic Athletic Association club located in Ballinascarty, Cork, Ireland. The club is affiliated to the Carbery Board and the Cork County Board and fields teams in Gaelic football, hurling and camogie.

== History ==
Located in the village of Ballinascarty, about 7 km north of Clonakilty, Ballinascarthy GAA Club was founded on 12 September 1945. The club has spent its entire existence operating in the junior grades. Ballinascarthy was initially solely focussed on Gaelic football before launching a hurling revival within the club in 1961.

Ballinascarthy won the South West JAFC title for the first time in their history in 1978, following a 0–09 to 0–08 win over Carbery Rangers. The club claimed a second such title in 1983. Ballinascarthy won their first South West JAHC title in 1989, before later being beaten by Clyda Rovers in the Cork JAHC final. Three further divisional hurling titles were won in a four-year period between 1997 and 2000. Ballinascarthy contested seven South West JAHC finals between 2017 and 2025, with the club claiming four titles during that period.

== Honours ==
- Cork Junior A Hurling Championship (0): (Runner-up 1989)
- Cork Under-21 B Hurling Championship (1): 2013,
- Cork Under-21 B Football Championship (0): (Runners-up 2014)
- Cork Minor B Hurling Championship (1): 2004
- Cork Feile B Football Championship (1): 2014
- Carbery Junior A Football Championship (2): 1978, 1983
- Carbery Junior A Hurling Championship (8): 1989, 1997, 1998, 2000, 2019, 2021, 2022, 2025
- South West Cork Junior B Football Championship (1): 1966
- West Cork Junior D Football Championship (1): 2005
- West Cork Minor B Hurling Championship (4): 1991, 2004 (as Pedlars Cross), 1999, 2001
- West Cork Under-21 A Hurling Championship (1): 1982
- West Cork Under-21 B Hurling Championship (6): 1986, 1989, 1993, 1998, 2010, 2013
- West Cork Under-21 B Football Championship (2): 1986, 2014

== Notable players ==
- Teddy Holland
- Fachtna Murphy
