= Carbery GAA =

Gaelic football and Hurling division in Ireland

Carbery
- Cairbre
- Founded: 1926
- County: Cork
- Colours: Purple with gold hoop
- Grounds: various

Playing kits
Standard colours

Senior Club Championships
	All Ireland	Munster champions	Cork champions
Football:	0	0	4
Hurling:	0	0	1

Carbery GAA is a Gaelic football and Hurling division in the south-west area of County Cork, Ireland. The division is one of eight divisions of the Cork County Board and a division is responsible for organising competitions for the clubs within the division from Under 12 up to adult level The winners of these competitions compete against other divisional champions to determine which club is the county champion. In addition, the division selects football and hurling teams from the adult teams playing at junior level or county intermediate level, and these then compete for the Cork GAA Senior Football Championship and Cork Senior Hurling Championship.

The Carbery division consists of 26 clubs from Bandon in the east to Bantry Blues in the west.

The Officers of the committee in 1925: Chairperson, J McCarthy, Kilmichael; vice-chairperson, P.J Cullinane, Skibbereen; rúnaí, Dan O'Donovan, Clonakilty; treasurer, C. Walsh, Bantry

== List of clubs ==
- Argideen Rangers
- Ballinascarthy
- Bandon
- Bantry Blues
- Barryroe
- Carbery Rangers
- Castlehaven
- Clann na nGael
- Clonakilty
- Diarmuid Ó Mathúnas
- Dohenys
- Gabriel Rangers
- Goleen
- Ilen Rovers
- Kilbrittain
- Kilmacabea
- Kilmeen and Kilbree
- Muintir Bháire
- Newcestown
- O'Donovan Rossa
- Randal Óg
- St Colum's
- St James
- St Mary's
- St Oliver Plunketts
- Tadhg MacCarthaigh

== Honours ==
- Cork Premier Senior Football Championship
  - (gold) Winners (4): 1937, 1968, 1971, 2004
  - (silver) Runners-Up (5): 1931, 1964, 1973, 1974, 2000
- Cork Premier Senior Hurling Championship
  - (gold) Winners (1): 1994
  - (silver) Runners-Up (1): 1993

== Football ==
Gaelic football is the stronger of the two sports played by clubs in this division. All 26 clubs play football at adult level.

=== Competitions ===
- Junior A Football Championship
- Junior B Football Championship
- Junior C Football Championship
- Junior D Football Championship
- Minor A Football Championship
- Minor B Football Championship
- Minor C Football Championship
- Under-21 A Football Championship
- Under-21 B Football Championship
- Under-21 C Football Championship

=== 2027 Championship Grades ===
Championship	Clubs
Senior
Premier Senior	Carbery
Premier Senior	Castlehaven
Premier Senior	Clonakilty
Premier Senior	Newcestown
Senior A	Carbery Rangers
Senior A	Dohenys
Intermediate
Premier Intermediate	Bantry Blues
Premier Intermediate	O'Donovan Rossa
Intermediate A	Bandon
Intermediate A	Gabriel Rangers
Intermediate A	Ilen Rovers
Junior
Premier Junior	Kilmacabea
Junior A	Argideen Rangers
Junior A	Barryroe
Junior A	Carbery Rangers (2)
Junior A	Castlehaven (2)
Junior A	Clann na nGael
Junior A	Clonakilty (2)
Junior A	Diarmuid Ó Mathúna's
Junior A	Goleen
Junior A	Kilbrittain
Junior A	Kilmeen
Junior A	Newcestown (2)
Junior A	Randal Óg
Junior A	St Colum's
Junior A	St James'
Junior A	St Mary's
Junior A	Tadhg McCarthaigh's
Junior B	Ballinascarthy
Junior B	Bandon (2)
Junior B	Bantry Blues (2)
Junior B	Dohenys (2)
Junior B	Gabriel Rangers (2)
Junior B	Ilen Rovers (2)
Junior B	Muintir Bháire
Junior B	O'Donovan Rossa (2)
Junior B	St James' (2)
Junior B	St Oliver Plunketts

== Hurling ==
Several teams do not play hurling at adult level. Some of these have started playing underage hurling, namely Carbery Rangers, Ilen Rovers, Kilmacabea, Goleen Those who do not play hurling at any level are Muintir Bháire, Tadhg MacCarthaigh, Castlehaven and Clann na nGael.

=== Competitions ===
- Carbery Junior A Hurling Championship
- Carbery Junior B Hurling Championship
- Carbery Junior C Hurling Championship
- Minor A Hurling Championship
- Minor B Hurling Championship
- Under-21 A Hurling Championship
- Under-21 B Hurling Championship
- Under-21 C Hurling Championship

=== 2027 Championship Grades ===
Championship	Clubs
Senior
Premier Senior	Carbery
Premier Senior	Newcestown
Senior A	None
Intermediate
Premier Intermediate	Bandon
Intermediate A	Kilbrittain
Junior
Premier Junior	Argideen Rangers
Premier Junior	Barryroe
Junior A	Ballinascarthy
Junior A	Bandon (2)
Junior A	Clonakilty
Junior A	Diarmuid Ó Mathúna's
Junior A	Dohenys
Junior A	Kilbree
Junior A	Kilbrittain (2)
Junior A	Newcestown (2)
Junior A	Randal Óg
Junior A	St. Colum's
Junior A	St James'
Junior A	St Mary's
Junior A	St Oliver Plunketts
Junior B	Ballinascarthy (2)
Junior B	Bantry Blues
Junior B	Barryroe (2)
Junior B	Gabriel Rangers
Junior B	Kilbree (2)
Junior B	O'Donovan Rossa
Junior C	Argideen Rangers (2)
Junior C	Bandon (3)
Junior C	Clonakilty (2)
Junior C	Kilbrittain (3)

== See also ==
- Cork GAA
  - Avondhu GAA
  - Beara GAA
  - Carbery GAA
  - Carrigdhoun GAA
  - Duhallow GAA
  - Imokilly GAA
  - Muskerry GAA
  - Seandún GAA

== External sources ==
- Divisional website
