= St Mary's GAA (Carbery) =

Gaelic games club in County Cork, Ireland

- CLG Naomh Muire
- Founded: 1968
- County: Cork
- Colours: Yellow and Black

Playing kits
Standard colours

St Mary's GAA is a Gaelic Athletic Association club based in the villages of Ballineen and Enniskeane, County Cork, Ireland. Founded in 1968, the club participates in both Gaelic football and hurling competitions. The club is a member of the Carbery division of Cork GAA. In 2009, the club won its first West Cork Junior A Football Championship. The club won the same competition in 2014, along with the Junior A Football league and Junior C Football league. The club has undertaken some joint fundraising activities with the local Enniskeane camogie club.

== Achievements ==
- West Cork Junior A Football Championship (2): 2009, 2014
- Cork Junior B Football Championship (1): 2004
- Cork Junior B Hurling Championship (0): (runners-Up in 1986, 2001, 2008)
- West Cork Junior B Hurling Championship (5): 1986, 1993, 2001, 2008, 2016
- West Cork Junior B Football Championship (2): 1980, 2004
- West Cork Minor B Hurling Championship (5): 1969, 1970, 1971 (as Fineen Rovers), 2002, 2006
- West Cork Minor B Football Championship (4): 1970 (as Fineen Rovers), 2003, 2006, 2009 (as Ahán Gaels)
- West Cork Under-21 B Hurling Championship (2): 1983, 2012
- West Cork Under-21 B Football Championship (5): 1978, 1979, 2002, 2006, 2010

== Notable players ==
- John Caulfield
