= Randal Óg CLG =

GAA club in County Cork

Randal Óg
- Founded: 1953
- County: Cork
- Colours: Yellow and Green
- Grounds: Bunanumera
- Coordinates: 51°42′29″N 9°01′44″W

Playing kits
Standard colours

The Randal Óg Gaelic Athletic Association club was founded in 1953, and is located in Ballinacarriga, County Cork, Ireland, near Dunmanway in the southwest of the county. The club currently competes at Junior A in both Gaelic football and hurling. The club combines with Dohenys at underage levels of competition to form the Sam Maguire GAA club. Randal Óg is part of the Carbery division of Cork GAA.

== History ==
The club was founded in 1953, and the club's first major success came in that year with the winning of the Junior B Football title. The Junior B Football title was won again in 1958. In 1959, the club were defeated in the semi-final of the A grade championship.

In 1966, the club entered a hurling team for the first time and since then both hurling and football have been played in the club. In 1973, the club recorded its first double victory, winning the West Cork Under-21 B Football and Hurling championships. In 1976, the Junior B football title was won once again.

In 1979, the Junior B hurling title was won for the first time. At the County Convention of Cork GAA in 1984, the club successfully put forward a motion to set up a County Junior B Hurling and Football competition.

A book, entitled "Finding Fifteen, The History of Randal Óg Hurling and Football Club" was published in 2007 to mark the fiftieth anniversary of the founding of the club.

== Honours ==
- Cork Junior B Hurling Championship (2): 1992, 2000
- Cork Junior B Football Championship (1): 2021
- Cork Junior B Inter-Divisional Football Championship (1): 2021
- Millennium Cup (Cork) Junior B Hurling Championship (1): 2000
- West Cork Junior B Hurling Championship (8): 1979, 1987, 1991, 1992, 2000, 2010, 2014, 2017
- West Cork Junior B Football Championship (6): 1953, 1958, 1976, 1999, 2010, 2021
- West Cork Under-21 B Hurling Championship (3): 1973, 1990, 1997
- West Cork Under-21 B Football Championship (1): 1973
- West Cork Under-21 C Football Championship (4): 2000, 2003, 2011, 2019
- West Cork Under-21 C Hurling Championship (3): 2000, 2003, 2011
