= 2024 Carbery Junior A Football Championship =

Annual Gaelic football competition season

- Dates: 26 July - December 2024
- Teams: 16
- Sponsor: Bandon Co-Op
- Champions: Kilmacabea (4th title); Diarmuid O'Callaghan (captain)
- Runners-up: Diarmuid Ó Mathúna's; Conor O'Sullivan (captain)
- Relegated: Clonakilty

Tournament statistics
- Matches played: 31
- Goals scored: 44 (1.42 per match)
- Points scored: 668 (21.55 per match)

The 2024 Carbery Junior A Football Championship was the 99th staging of the Carbery Junior A Football Championship since its establishment by the West Cork Board in 1926. The draw for the group stage placings took place on 20 February 2024. The championship ran from 26 July to December 2024.

Barryroe were the defending champions, however, they failed to qualify for the knockout stage.

The final was played on 26 October 2024 at Sam Maguire Park in Dunmanway, between Kilmacabea and Diarmuid Ó Mathúna's, in what was their first ever meeting in the final. Kilmacabea won the match by 1–12 to 1–04 to claim their fourth championship title overall and a first title in four years.

== Team changes ==
=== To Championship ===
Promoted as Cork Junior B Football Championship champions

- St Oliver Plunketts

=== From Championship ===
Relegated to the Carbery Junior B Hurling Championship

- Bandon

== Group 1 ==
=== Group 1 table ===
Knockout stage

Team	Matches				Score			Pts
Team	Pld	W	D	L	For	Against	Diff	Pts
Ballinascarthy	3	1	1	1	43	25	18	5
Diarmuid Ó Mathúna's	3	2	0	1	40	45	-5	4
St Colum's	3	0	2	1	36	37	-1	2
Kilbrittain	3	0	1	2	33	45	-12	1

=== Group 1 results ===
26 July 2024 Round 1	Kilbrittain	1-10 - 0-18	Diarmuid Ó Mathúna's	St Oliver Plunkett Park
	J O'Donovan 1-3, C Hogan 0-4, C Sheehan 0-1, M Hickey 0-1, T Sheehan 0-1.		J O'Callaghan 0-7, M Draper 0-3, G O'Donovan 0-3, J Fleming 0-2, E Mangan 0-1, K O'Donovan 0-1, C O'Sullivan 0-1.

27 July 2024 Round 1	Ballinascarthy	1-07 - 1-07	St Colum's	Páirc na hAidhlean

18 August 2024 Round 2	Ballinascarthy	3-10 - 0-08	Diarmuid Ó Mathúna's	Ballinacarriga Grounds

18 August 2024 Round 2	St Colum's	1-10 - 0-13	Kilbrittain	Páirc Tadhg na Samhna
	D O'Mahony 0-4, S Murnane 1-0.		C Hogan 0-8.

15 September 2024 Round 3	Ballinascarthy	0-14 - 0-07	Kilbrittain	Timoleague Grounds

15 September 2024 Round 3	St Colum's	1-10 - 2-08	Diarmuid Ó Mathúna's	Wolfe Tone Park

== Group 2 ==
=== Group 2 table ===
Knockout stage

Team	Matches				Score			Pts
Team	Pld	W	D	L	For	Against	Diff	Pts
Kilmacabea	3	3	0	0	55	29	26	6
Castlehaven	3	2	0	1	42	41	1	4
St Oliver Plunketts	3	1	0	2	29	37	-8	2
Newcestown	3	0	0	3	26	45	-19	0

=== Group 2 results ===
27 July 2024 Round 1	Kilmacabea	0-17 - 0-11	Castlehaven	Páirc Tadhg na Samhna
	D Gore 0-9, C McCarthy 0-2, I Jennings 0-2, D McCarthy 0-1, O Kerrisk 0-1, J Collins 0-1, L McCarthy 0-1.		M Maguire 0-9, S Nolan 0-1, D Whelton 0-1.

28 July 2024 Round 1	Newcestown	0-03 - 0-10	St Oliver Plunketts	Henry Ford Park
	P Collins 0-1, M Kelly 0-1, C O'Donovan 0-1.		MP Keohane 0-5, R O'Driscoll 0-3, S White 0-1, D McCarthy 0-1.

17 August 2024 Round 2	Kilmacabea	2-17 - 0-09	St Oliver Plunketts	St James' Pak
	D Gore 1-5, E Shanahan 0-4, K Whelton 1-0, J Collins 0-3, R Shanahan 0-2, O Tobin 0-1, R Hourihane 0-1, I Jennings 0-1.		M Keohane 0-3, B Walsh 0-3, S White 0-2, P Healy 0-1.

18 August 2024 Round 2	Castlehaven	3-11 - 1-11	Newcestown	Páirc Uinsinn

13 September 2024 Round 3	Kilmacabea	0-15 - 0-09	Newcestown	Aughaville Grounds

14 September 2024 Round 3	Castlehaven	0-11 - 0-10	St Oliver Plunketts	Rosscarbery Grounds

== Group 3 ==
=== Group 3 table ===
Knockout stage

Team	Matches				Score			Pts
Team	Pld	W	D	L	For	Against	Diff	Pts
Argideen Rangers	3	2	1	0	38	31	7	5
Randal Óg	3	1	1	1	39	43	-4	3
Tadhg Mac Cárthaigh	3	1	1	1	57	37	20	3
Kilmeen	3	0	1	2	31	54	-23	1

=== Group 3 results ===
26 July 2024 Round 1	Tadhg Mac Cárthaigh	1-10 - 1-10	Argideen Rangers	Rossmore Grounds

27 July 2024 Round 1	Randal Óg	0-14 - 1-11	Kilmeen	Páirc Uí Mhurchú

16 August 2024 Round 2	Argideen Rangers	1-13 - 0-11	Randal Óg	Henry Ford Park
	JM O'Callaghan 0-4, J Crowley 1-0, S Maxwell 0-3, S Walsh 0-2, D Holland 0-2, B Fleming 0-2.		Peter Collins 0-5, Patrick Collins 0-2, C O'Neill 0-1, C Murray 0-1, S Crowley 0-1, A Buckley 0-1.

18 August 2024 Round 2	Tadhg Mac Cárthaigh	4-19 - 0-10	Kilmeen	Leap Grounds

14 September 2024 Round 3	Argideen Rangers	0-09 - 1-04	Kilmeen	Castletown Grounds
	D Holland 0-4, B Fleming 0-2, D Walsh 0-1, J Lawton 0-1, S Maxwell 0-1.		K Keohane 1-1, C Twohig 0-2, L Daly 0-1.

14 September 2024 Round 3	Tadhg Mac Cárthaigh	2-07 - 0-14	Randal Óg	Páirc Tadhg na Samhna

== Group 4 ==
=== Group 4 table ===
Knockout stage

Team	Matches				Score			Pts
Team	Pld	W	D	L	For	Against	Diff	Pts
Carbery Rangers	3	3	0	0	41	31	10	6
St Mary's	3	2	0	1	43	37	6	4
Barryroe	3	1	0	2	43	39	4	2
Clonakilty	3	0	0	3	32	52	-20	0

=== Group 4 results ===
27 July 2024 Round 1	St Mary's	2-12 - 0-12	Clonakilty	Timoleague Grounds
	O Corcoran 1-6.

28 July 2024 Round 1	Barryroe	1-09 - 0-13	Carbery Rangers	St James' Park
	O O'Donovan 0-5, S Holland 1-1, D Ó Buachalla 0-2, M Crowley 0-1.		T Cullinane 0-9, C Hayes 0-1, A Jennings 0-1, E Browne 0-1, J O'Regan 0-1.

16 August 2024 Round 2	Carbery Rangers	2-06 - 0-11	St Mary's	Rossmore Grounds
	M Maguire 1-0, C Hayes 1-0, T Cullinane 0-2, C O'Donovan 0-1, J O'Brien 0-1, C Twomey 0-1, J Hayes 0-1.		O Corcoran 0-8, N Kelleher 0-2, L Kearney 0-1.

17 August 2024 Round 2	Barryroe	1-15 - 0-12	Clonakilty	Kilbrittain Grounds
	O O'Donovan 0-6, S Holland 1-1, R O'Donovan 0-4, D Ó Buachalla 0-2, T Ó Buachalla 0-1, A McSweeney 0-1.		J Leahy 0-8, D Kenneally 0-2, C Ryan 0-1, S Collins 0-1.

13 September 2024 Round 3	Carbery Rangers	0-16 - 0-08	Clonakilty	Ballinacarriga Grounds
	T Cullinane 0-5, J O'Brien 0-4, C Hayes 0-2, C O'Donovan 0-2, C Twomey 0-2, C Keane 0-1.		J Campbell 0-4, J Leahy 0-2, C Ryan 0-1, S Collins 0-1.

15 September 2024 Round 3	Barryroe	0-13 - 1-11	St Mary's	St James' Park
	R O'Donovan 0-7, A McSweeney 0-2, S Holland 0-1, C Dineen 0-1, D Ó Buachalla 0-1, D Murphy 0-1.	Report	D O'Donovan 1-4, N Kelleher 0-3, O Corcoran 0-2, R Scannell 0-1, E Scannell 0-1.

== Knockout stage ==
=== Relegation playoffs ===
7 December 2024 Playoff	Clonakilty	1-08 - 1-12	Kilbrittain	Páirc Uí Mhurchú

14 December 2024 Playoff	Kilmeen	v	Newcestown	St Mary's Park

=== Quarter-finals ===
28 September 2024 Quarter-final	Carbery Rangers	0-12 - 3-11	Diarmuid Ó Mathúna's	Ballinacarriga Grounds
	T Cullinane 0-6, J O'Brien 0-2, N Keane 0-1, K Fitzpatrick 0-1, E Hayes 0-1, C Twomey 0-1.	Report	K O'Donovan 1-5, M Draper 1-0, C O'Sullivan 1-0, J O'Callaghan 0-3, C O'Donovan 0-2, J Lucey 0-1.

28 September 2024 Quarter-final	Argideen Rangers	0-11 - 0-11; Penalties: 4-5	Castlehaven	Aughaville Grounds
	D Holland 0-7, B Fleming 0-1, S Walsh 0-1, D Walsh 0-1, C Lehane 0-1.	Report	D Whelton 0-4, S Nolan 0-4, S Walsh 0-1, S Dineen 0-1, R Whelton 0-1.

6 October 2024 Quarter-final	Kilmacabea	0-13 - 1-08	Randal Óg	Timoleague Grounds
	C McCarthy 0-7, I Jennings 0-2, E Shanahan 0-2, D McCarthy 0-1, D Gore 0-1.	Report	D Collins 1-3, S Crowley 0-1, Patrick Collins 0-1, Peter Collins 0-1, A Brickley 0-1.

12 October 2024 Quarter-final	Ballinascarthy	0-07 - 1-11	St Mary's	Páirc Naomh Eoin
		Report	O Corcoran 1-4.

=== Semi-finals ===
11 October 2024 Semi-final	Castlehaven	0-10 - 1-10	Diarmuid Ó Mathúna's	Sam Maguire Park
		Report

19 October 2024 Semi-final	Kilmacabea	1-13 - 1-09	St Mary's	Ballinacarriga Grounds

=== Final ===
26 October 2024 Final	Diarmuid Ó Mathúna's	1-04 - 1-12	Kilmacabea	Sam Maguire Park
	T O’Leary 1-1, J O’Callaghan, K O’Donovan, S Crowley (f) 0-1 each.	Report	I Jennings 1-1, D Gore (0-1 m), C McCarthy (0-1 45, 0-1 f) 0-4 each, D McCarthy, M Collins, L McCarthy 0-1 each.	Referee: I McCarthy (Bandon)
