= History of Durrus and District =

History of a County Cork, Ireland area

The area surrounding Durrus village and civil parish has been inhabited since Neolithic times. The current layout of Durrus village, in West Cork in the south of Ireland, has its basis in developments during the 19th century.

== Prehistory to middleages ==
Neolithic (3500–1500 BC) monuments at Coolcoulaghta and at Dunmanus provide evidence of pre-Celtic population in the area. In 1700–1500 BC, copper was mined at Mount Gabriel and at Derrycarhoon. Later on, around 500 BC, the Celts started arriving in a process that lasted for quite some time slowly overlaying the local population who adopted their language and culture.

The Annals of Innisfallen state that St. Ciarán of Cape Clear came back to his native place from Rome in 402 AD and introduced Christianity to the area. By the sixth century AD, a number of St. Finbarr's disciples were living in Muintir Bhaire. Some time in the sixth or seventh century, the family now known as the O'Mahonys from the Eoghanach in North Munster arrived in the area. By the eighth century they were well settled in Muintir Bhaire.

The McCarthys arrived in the twelfth century, and by 1185 they had secured the lands of the O'Mahonys. Tadhg Rua McCarthy built a castle at Scart, now demolished. He was called Tadhg Rua na Scairte and the family later built Cul na Long, the fortified castle some 1 mile (1.6 km) outside Durrus. The O'Donovans also arrived in the twelfth century and secured some of the O'Mahony lands. By 1190, the Normans had reached as far west as Durrus, but were repulsed by the Desmumu (people of South Munster).

From 1375 onwards, the herring fishery was established in the area, and tribute was paid by the French and Iberian fleets to the O'Mahony, O'Driscoll and McCarthy families. This conferred on them the right to fish and also to build on shore bases to salt their catch. This prosperity gave rise to the building of tower houses in the area. For example, the O'Mahonys built twelve fortifications, including examples at Rossmore, Dunbeacon and Ballydevlin.

=== Parish boundaries ===
The boundary between the baronies of Bantry and Carbery coincided with those of Clann Taidhg Ruaidh and McCarthy's lands. The parts in Durrus Barony reaching from the site of Bantry Abbey along the bay to Rooska, was in the territory of O'Sullivans of Bantry. Clann Taidhg Ruaidh had no direct access to Bantry Bay, as the only townland touching it in both Carbery, Bantry and Durrus Parish was Killoveenogue. This was the property of Philip O'Sullivan in 1641. The territory of Clann Taidhg Ruaidh did not extend to the South side of Durrus Parish of Four Mile Water River. Here were the townlands of Coolcoulaghta, formerly Coorcoulaghta, Dromreagh, and Ballycommane. The first two formed part of the Taidhg O'Mahony lands, and the Earl of Cork acquired Dromreagh prior to 1641. Ballycommane was part of the lands of the Clann Diarmada (McCarthy of Cloghane) which were confiscated after the attainder of Domnall MacCormaic, and was acquired by Sir Cormac Mac Taidhg of Blarney, who later mortgaged it to Sir Walter Coppinger. The Clann Taidhg Ruaidh occupied the remainder of the old Durrus Parish, as far as the borders of the Kilcrohane Parish, which was the territory of the O'Dalys. From around the seventeenth century, the main focus of the area had shifted from Scart on the present Cork-Bantry Road and the Dunmanus Bay area, to the head of Dunmanus Bay. Canon Cahalane, parish priest 1955–1958, of Bantry, believed that there may have been a 'lost parish', 'Inis Cuinge' between the present parishes of Durrus and Bantry and that Whiddy Island may have been part of it. An inquisition was held in 1731 which said that Aengus O'Daly of Ballyroon, Donnell O'Daly of Rossnacaigreagh and Teigh O'Daly of Mulanaskish Ahakista originally held their lands from the Carews, and from the 1331 escheat of the Carew lands, they became tenants of the crown

In the Hondius map of 1591, the peninsulas of the South West appear. The Durrus river is named Fl. Bellemire and is shown flowing into Dunmanus Bay.

== 17th and 18th centuries ==
=== Pilchard fishery c.1600–1750 ===
The pilchard industry was an important industry in the area. Bantry was the primary centre, together with outlying curing station called "Pallices" of which there were a number in Dunmanus and Bantry Bay areas. Fish was caught with the seine net, which together with the curing at the fish pallices had been introduced by English settlers in the period.

=== Battle of Kinsale and Carew's assault on Dunboy Castle 1602/Dunmanus Castle ===
The army of Carew embarked at Kilevanoge to lay siege to Dunboy Castle on the opposite shore. Later on Carew and Mountjoy employed the services of Aongus O Dalaigh of Kilcrohane the prime satirist of the times to compose a satire on 'The Tribes of Ireland'. He was stabbed in 1617 by one of the O'Meaghers of Tipperary as a result of one of his satires.

After the battle of Kinsale the O'Mahony family garrisoned Dunmanus castle and on 4 June 1602 one of Carew's officers accompanied by one of Sir Owen O'Sullivan's sons raided the castle and kept it killing four of the guard. The O'Mahonys regained the castle but, in July, Captain Robert Harvey recovered it. The previous March the under-aged ward of Carew, Donal O'Mahony, had succeeded as chief on his brother's death. As a minor and not taking part in the rising his lands were safe from forfeiture and the O'Mahonys continued to hold the castle. However, following the 1641 rising and the raid on Sir William Hull's fish palace involving the O'Mahonys of Dunmanus the lands comprising 1,594 acres (6.45 km^{2}) were confiscated, taking effect in 1649.

=== Garrison 1620-1630s Four Mile Water ===
There was a garrison in Four Mile Water as well as other centres in the region, for example, Bantry, 57 soldiers, Crookhaven. Cul na Long Castle was built between 1610 and 1640 by Teige na Muclagh McCarthy in a transitional Irish-Jacobean style. Following the rising of 1641 the lands of McCarthy Muclagh belonging to Teig's sons Teige and Owen including Cul na Long were confiscated. In the opinion of Bantry antiquarian Paddy O' Keeffe, it was a unique example of the work of craftsmen who transferred the castle-monastic ornamentation to Cul na Long. He attempted unsuccessfully to have it taken into the care of the Office of Public Works. The property was granted to a Colonel Reide after 1641. It is believed that Lieutenant Nathaniel Evanson (he received 2,400 acres (9.7 km^{2}) at Castle Donovan after the 1641 rebellion) moved to Cul na Long after 1660, as Four Mile Water Castle. The adjoining Durrus Court was known as Brookfield in 1823 and the residence of Evanson, a magistrate. It came into the control of Lord Bandon by purchase from the Evansons by Judge Bernard before 1731. The last direct descendant of the McCarthy Muclaghs died in a cottage in Dunbeacon in 1795. Fr. Dan McCarthy, P.P. of Durrus in 1793 and a classical scholar (he was interpreter between General Dalrymple and French officer Prosseau in 1796) was a McCarthy Muclagh. There is still a headland near Dunbeacon Castle known as Muckla Point.

=== Evansons ===
In Bishop Dive Downes' tour 1699, he refers to Vicar Thomas Holmes of Kilmacomoge preaching every fourth Sunday at Captain Evanson's house at Four Mile Water. Nathaniel Evanson the elder had three children, a son with no issue, a daughter who married a Beamish and a son Charles who married Susan Arnap in 1688. Their eldest son was Nathaniel, who married Mary Alleyn in 1724. Their grandson Nathaniel was at Four Mile Water in the 1790s. He married Mary Townsend Baldwin in 1784 and their children were Alleyn who was ordained and Tonson (Richard) who built Friendly Cove. He married Melian Donovan in 1812 who died childless and then Mary Beamish in 1816. They had no sons and Friendly Cove passed to William Beamish Morris who married their daughter Catherine. In Pigot's Directory of 1824 Nathaniel Evanson and Richard Evansonis are at Four Mile Water Nathaniel Evanson, Sea Lodge, Cork died in 1849 and the Rev. Alleyn Evanson died in 1853. In Slaters Directory of 1846 Allen Evanson lives at the court, Richard Tonson Evanson at Friendly Cove, Richard Tomson Evanson Jnr. at Ardgoina. There is no reference to them in Thom's 1862 Directory. There are two references to Evansons of Brookfield, Cork in the King's Inns Admission rolls for the early nineteenth century. The Rev. A. Evanson sat on a committee in Bantry in 1824 to petition against the withdrawal of the linen bounty.

=== O'Donovans ===
One of the O'Donovans of Clann Lochlainn received land in fee simple at Ardahill, Kilcrohane but there is now no trace of this residence. Another O'Donovan of Clann Cathail held land of Congreve, Mount Congreve near Waterford and their house was at Fort Lodge (O'Donovan's Cove) near Ahakista. In the eighteenth and nineteenth centuries families in West Cork and South Kerry such as the O'Donovans, the O'Leary, the O'Sullivans, the Sweeneys and McCarthys managed to acquire leasehold interests as middlemen and had close ties of marriage with each other. Richard O'Donovan of O'Donovan's Cove is listed in Pigot's Directory of 1824 but was at Fort Lodge in 1846, as recorded by Slater as well as being one of County Cork's property owners in 187? at Carrigboy. Daniel O'Donovan of Ahakista cottage (now demolished) was a Magistrate according to Slater in 1862. Tim O'Donovan was at O'Donovan's Cove according to Thoms, 1862.

=== Sir William Petty's Census, 1659 ===
This was compiled to provide a tax base which ultimately became a heart tax. The region was described as 'Part of Dunisse Parish.'

A table sets out the land ownership. The total area is 8,674 acres (35.10 km^{2}), with 5,646 acres (22.85 km^{2}) profitable, 3,078 acres (12.46 km^{2}) unprofitable. This document is the Down Survey, completed 1656 and published 1685 as part of Hiberniae Delineatio in the National Library Ms 714. Petty, in 1687, believed that land values were substantially higher than in 1641 even though the population had not recovered to its previous level.

=== Naval battle, Bantry Bay, 1689 ===
There was a major naval engagement in Bantry Bay on 1 May 1689 involving the English and French fleets and the French are believed to have won a marginal victory. The English had 22 vessels and lost 96 killed, 269 wounded while the French fleet was 28 vessels and they lost 40 killed, 93 wounded.

== 18th century ==
=== Indictment of priests in 1714 ===
On 9 April 1714, Fr. Humphrey O'Sullivan P.P. Durrus, Fr. Daniel McCarthy, P.P. Schull, Fr. Teige McCarthy P.P. Caheragh, Fr. George Gould, P.P. Bantry were indicted at the general assizes and gaol delivery at Cork

=== Irish Famine of 1740-41 ===
In March 1741 Thomas Prior founder of the RDS said that Sir Thomas Cox of Dunmanway related that due to a failure of the potato crop 500 people had died in his area. Around 350,000 people died including one fifth of Munster's population. It was referred to as Bliain an Air, the year of the slaughter. This famine may have been even more severe than the great famine of 1847 in terms of mortality from starvation and disease.

=== Late 18th century subsistence agriculture ===
In O'Flanagan and Buttimer's work, Cork History and Society they single out the insular peninsular world of Schull-Kilcrohane-Beara as showing a pattern of densely populated clustered settlements with population densities of South East Asian proportions. This was possible due to complex partnership arrangements in the organisation of land use and work rhythms and the use of the spade for cultivation due to a surplus of labour. Joint farming was integral and marine resources of seaweed and marine coral sand was extensively used. In Dunmanus Bay this came from Carbery Island among other places. Seasonal migration to the better farmlands of East Cork and Munster also added to income. In South Kilkenny, Amhloaimh O Suilleabhain (Humphrey O'Sullivan) said that a "spailpina bochta" could earn 8d. a day and the sickle men "lucht corain "15d. Added to this widespread sub-division, early marriages, the availability of wasteland, smallpox inoculation and the presence of a cottier textile industry and the contribution of fishing allowed a massive population expansion. Land was let by the 'gneeve' i.e. the grass of one cow or one twelfth of a ploughland. The contribution of the wife by keeping poultry and spinning was important. Between 1766 and 1821 the number of households in the Durrus area increased by 60/69%, the population rose significantly.

From the land appropriations of the 1650s and 1660s, to the Rising of 1798 and the Napoleonic Wars there was a long period of peace and prosperity. The gradual introduction of those with expertise and the new technology to improve farming practices, contributed to a prosperity, which engendered rapid population expansion. During this period, South Munster was transformed into a major agricultural area, centred on the Port of Cork. Cork City underwent a phenomenal expansion, with rapid population growth with hinterland immigration and from abroad. Central to its growth was the provisioning of the Royal Navy for what was termed "wet goods" (dairy products, salted and cured meats). Dry goods for the Royal Navy were provided from East Anglia. Important in securing Royal Navy contracts were London based families with Cork connections, such as the Southwells (also of Kinsale), and descendants of the Boyle/Shannon families, who were influential in official circles at the time. The benefits reached into the furthest peninsulas, old tradition has it that people travelled from Kilcrohane to Cork with butter, and from as far as Dursey on the Beara Peninsula, to Cork with pigs. A considerable amount of the trade would have been sea-borne, in small wooden vessels, to Cork.

=== Vallancey Survey 1778 ===
General Charles Vallancey was sent to Ireland to assist in a military survey, remained and became an authority on Irish antiquities. He wrote a report on the West Cork area which should also hold true for Durrus at the period, 'there was only one road between Cork and Bantry; you may now proceed by eight carriage roads beside several horse tracks branching off from these great roads, from Bantry the country is mountainous and from the high road has the appearance of being barren and very thinly populated; yet the valleys abound with, corn and potatoes and the mountains are covered with black cattle in 1760, twenty years ago it was so thinly inhabited an army of 10,000 men could not possible have found subsistence between Bantry and Bandon. The face of the country now wears a different aspect: the sides of the hill are under the plough, the verges of the bogs are reclaimed and the southern coast from Skibbereen to Bandon is one continued garden of grain and potatoes except the barren pinnacles of some hills and the boggy hollows between which are preserved for fuel' (Original in British Library)

== 19th century ==
=== Anti-Tithe Meeting Mount Gabriel, April 1832. ===
In the pre-reformation period tithes were a voluntary offering to the clergy in thanks for their work. It was divided in three, one third was for to provide education for all the poor and youth in the parish, one third to provide for the needs of the impoverished and the balance for the upkeep of the church. This was written By Dáibhí de Barra in an account of a tithe affray at Rossmore Strand, Carrightohill. After the Reformation the tithes went to the Protestant clergy and it was also levied on crops not on grassland.

A monster meeting was held at the base of Mount Gabriel to protest against tithes attended by tithe payers from Schull, Kilmoe and Durrus. Many Protestants and Methodists attended. The men of Durrus were under the command of Richard O’Donovan of Tullagh accompanied by the Parish Priest Fr. Quinn and his curate Fr. Kelleher. Later Frs. Quinn and Kelleher were prosecuted for urging their flock not to pay tithes,

In the context of resolving the ongoing agitation in relation to tithes in 1827, a new valuation system was undertaken, with the intention of extending the tithe to pastures as well as tillage, to try to ensure a more equitable system. The land was classified as arable, pasture, mountain or bogland. The rate levied on arable land was 7¾%, and 2½% on bog and mountain.

=== Poor Inquiry 1833 ===
It was advised by Fr. Kelleher, Curate of Durrus, that 'the lands are let to the highest bidder; the competition is very great, the tenant holds no tenure in almost every case, but his landlord's will or caprice and that neither landlord or tenant look beyond the gain of the hour the face of the country testifies'

=== Monster Meeting Curragh Hill, Skibbereen 1842 ===
Daniel O'Connell presided at a monster meeting in July 1842 attended by an enormous crowd from all districts of West Cork. Prior to the meeting he lodged with Fr. Doheney P.P. Dunmanway and travelled with him by coach and four, as they approached Skibbereen they were feted by a procession made up of bakers, blacksmiths, shoemakers, tailors and weavers preceded by a band. The Liberator's carriage was followed by those of gentlemen and clergy. He started the address sin Irish and then switched to English. He spent the night with the administrator Fr. Fitzpatrick and was presented with £500 repeal rent. It is regarded as the largest crowd ever to gather in West Cork. In the memoirs of T. D.Sullivan (one of the Home Rule MPs from Bantry/Durrus Cross), he describes the temperance bands going from Bantry to the Monster Meetings in Skibbereen during his youth.

=== Famine ===
There were 'minor' famines in 1817 and 1822. There was a very wet and cold summer and autumn in 1816, a typhus epidemic broke out and up to 65,000 died countrywide from fever. In 1822 reports of distress commenced in April. Among the relief measures was the efforts of the City of London Tavern a grouping of business and banking people in London and they sent the Rev. John Jagoe (Schull) a cargo of meal for Schull and Durrus. Relief was carried out on a cross community basis. The ratio of the population receiving rations in Durrus Parish was between 60 and 70 percent. The vicar, William Moore Crosthwaite received 20 barrels of meal from the Quaker Boston Relief Committee. His health suffered and caused his eventual death in 1855. The Rev Allen Evanson received £25 for 20 bags of rice from the Friends Central Relief Committee on 12 April 1847. Both O'Donovan and the Evansons seek grants under the Land Improvement Act 1848 on 2 February. In February 1848 there were 191 from Durrus in the Bantry Workhouse. Pre famine the population was in 1841, 3731 and in 1851? this dropped to 2003, the number of houses went from 595 to 324. A sworn enquiry was held and the physician was called on to resign and the master and matron dismissed.

=== Improvement in agricultural conditions 1851-1859 ===
The price of butter on the Cork Market rose by 45% from 1851 and 1859 and store cattle by 50%. Guano a natural fertilizer from Peru was used together with mangolds turnips and improved grass varieties on the more progressive farms. Around this time the Royal Dublin Society was sending Inspectors around the area to teach best practice. Coral sand and seaweed were used to improve the soil. In Bantry Bay boats were engaged in coral sand, it would take three hours to load a boat and the cargo would fetch 8s. There were also twenty boats involved in the collection of seaweed, with a crew of two men and two boys earning 6-7s in the season. There was reorganisation of scattered land holdings. This tied in with the Bandon Estate taking over the Evanson holdings in Durrus. It is not clear if this was because of lease expiry or purchase. The Bandon Estate invested heavily, rebuilt the village in its present form in the 1850s and carried out land improvements. The records of the Dohertys, managers of the Estate would suggest a commercial and competent management, however the nature of the land and the poor condition of many of the tenants may have militated against the success of this. In 1860 a memorial was presented in Bantry to establish a branch of the National Bank, it was pointed out that there was a lack of coins and notes restricting commerce. Eventually in March 1865 the Munster and Leinster Bank established a branch in Bantry. There was a further period of distress in 1860. There were very large imports of Indian meal to Bantry in the 1860s as it had become a staple part of the diet.

=== Lord Bandon ===
The Bernards of Bandon became the Earls of Bandon in 1800. Sometime in the 1840/50s they came into possession of estates in Durrus, comprising townlands around the village and west to Ahakista. Lord Bandon is reputed to have built the folly at Drumnea, Kilcrohane as relief work 1n 1847. May Roberts, Brahalish in the 1890s remembers Lord Bandon arriving in the area in a four-wheeled car drawn by a pair of fine grey horses with Timmy Burke, the coachman on top. The Philips family were local agents.

=== Brahalish Bracelet ===
In 1843 the present road from Durrus to Kilcrohane was being built a gold bracelet was discovered at the Red Cliff at Brahalish. The Archaeological Journal's Cork correspondent Edward Hoare reported that it had been sent to the British Museum. It is dated at 500 BC.

=== Griffith Valuation 1847-1849 ===
As a consequence of the Poor Relief (Ireland) Act 1838 (1 & 2 Vict. c. 56) a requirement for a new system of valuation to ensure the tax to be known as "rates" would be assessed, on a consistent basis. It became known as Griffith's Valuation (the primary valuation of tenants) was commenced in West Corkin 1847–1849. Richard Griffith was the Director of the Valuation, he had previously been responsible for the building of the road from Skibbereen to Crookhaven, and the improvement of the road from Dunmanway to Bantry. Most of the detailed survey work in the area was done by Thomas Cox and J. H. Colthurst. In their valuations they had regard to the availability of sea manure i.e. sea sand and sea weed. Sea sand had been used in the area for 300 years before the survey. Sea Sand would be taken up to 10–15 miles (16–24 km) inland and seaweed 2 to 3 miles (3.2 to 4.8 km). In Durrus four of the nine townlands had rights to seaweed, and a respect of sea sand 18/- was the cost of a large boat load of sand containing about 16 one-horse cart loads. Land was valued at a premium of 12.5% to 20% and sometimes higher if it had access to a shore supply of manure, Dromreagh "it is 1 ½ miles from the shore". It might be noted that the (coral) sand of Bantry Bay is an algal growth as opposed to shell sand. A tenement was defined as holding land or a building, or both together, and it was valued at 1850 prices, having regard to the fertility of the soil, and lands and buildings were valued separately. The division of a tenement into sub-tenements was indicated by the use of letters, and holdings in common were bracketed together. It is still the case that certain lands are held in common, for example in Coomkeen some of the rough land in held in shares of one seventh accruing to the farms there or in Classadoo. This is officially reflected in the Land Registry Folio. Joe O’Driscoll b.1924 remembers old people minding cattle in Dunbeacon on the undivided part of larger fields. This may indicate a survival of the rundale system of land ownership. A House List accompanied the Survey, indicating the dimensions of each particular building.

The survey did not, however, record the presence of cottiers, or those who did not have a legal interest in the land which they occupied.

=== Land agitation 1880s ===
Much of the land in Durrus was owned by the Bandon Estate and was managed by the Doherty Family (their estate papers are in the Cork Archive Institute but are uncatalogued). In July 1882 R.W. Doherty Jnr. complained that tenants 'but principally those of Durrus near Bantry had paid no rent since 1880, his father had said in September 1881 'The Land Leagues are destroying the country and a lot of Protestants have joined them ... the Protestants at Durrus would pay no rent unless allowed 25% off. More like savages then human beings'.

=== Land improvement/ Land Acts ===
In the period after the famine the larger farms were run on more commercial lines and firms such as Warners in Bantry supplied an increasing range of machinery. This included furze cutting machines mangle grinders which had their logo and a range of horse drawn machinery. George Vickery, Ballycomane was a prizewinner in the Carbery Show, Skibbereen in 1896 and 1897.

=== Distress 1890-1891 ===
There was a failure of the potato crop in 1889 which caused widespread distress in 1890. A public meeting was held in November 1890 headed by Fr. Kearney and the Rev. John Pratt and suggested the extension of the railway line from Durrus road to Dunmanus Bay.

== 20th century ==
=== World War I 1914–1918 ===
During World War I, Bere Island was the base of the British Atlantic fleet and was the operating base for a flotilla of small boats and trawlers engaged in anti-U-boat activities. There was also a kite balloon station in the area, the U.S. Naval Air Station at Berehaven, which was used for anti-U-boat activities on a 67-acre (270,000 m^{2}) site. Bere Island hosted a military hospital opened in 1915. It was also a training camp.

The US Navy's Air Wing established a seaplane base on the eastern end of Whiddy Island. This base, the U.S. Naval Air Station at Whiddy Island, became operational on 25 September 1918 and was used to patrol an area around Fastnet. The station closed in January 1919.

=== Revolutionary period ===
The memoirs of Willie Kingston, Solicitor, Skibbereen (1885–1965), provide an interesting insight into the Irish revolutionary period from a Protestant. He was born a Methodist and qualified as a solicitor working in his cousin Jasper Wolfe's office. He sympathised with the objectives of Sinn Féin, but abhorred the brutalities committed by both sides. He described his shock at the killings of William Connell and Matt Sweetman by the Irish Republican Army (IRA) on 19 February 1921. He wrote that at the end of 1920, when it became apparent that the troubles would continue a wave of emigration included some of his own friends. He described the period after the truce, when in April 1922 a wave of killings by Irregulars included Solicitor Francis Fitzmaurice in Dunmanway whom he had considered joining in practice. Others were shot around this time and rumours spread of a general massacre of Protestants. He decided to "clear off to Dublin" on 29 April 1922. He described the train from Cork to Dublin as filled with frightened Protestants. In the course of the journey, an explosion hit the tunnel in Cork, shots were fired at Limerick Junction and he saw a man with a revolver.

In an attack by 5th Battalion, Cork No. 3 Brigade led by Ted O'Sullivan, on Durrus Royal Irish Constabulary (RIC) Barracks, Constable Donovan injured his right hand and eventually lost it. O'Farrell claimed one RIC man was killed. Bantry Courthouse Burned 25 June 1920. Bantry RIC Barracks burnt 1920 (now part of Bantry Bay Hotel).

An ambush on RIC on Bog Road, Clonee killed Constable Brett on 21 June 1920. He had been in the RIC for 30 years, the last 8 in Bantry. He was cycling with Constable Cleary, Sergeant Driscoll and Constables Cuniffe and Quinn. When they arrived at Clonee Wood on the road to Durrus from Bantry, they were raked by gunfire. Between 20 and 30 assailants were involved. The inquest in Bantry was presided over by Coroner Neville, with input from a number of jurors. It was said at the inquest that "no policeman that ever came to Bantry was more popular, and, deservedly so".

Bigg's Mill burned at the Quay in Bantry on 25 July. G. W. Biggs wrote a letter to a newspaper stating that this was not the work of Sinn Féin. The barytes mine was raided with explosives. Vickeries Hotel burnt in May 1921. Two bridges were blown up at the creamery and Dunbeacon Road.

In April 1921, Wolfe, Kingston and Miss Brown motored to Durrus where Wolfe had a case at Petty Sessions. Kingston had been in Bantry earlier where he saw two men coming towards him, one saying to the other "that's him". He thought it was a case of mistaken identity. Later he met Jasper at the hotel. The group added cattle dealer (Bawnie) TT McCarthy earlier and drove to Durrus. Leaving Durrus for Caheragh, McCarthy was in front with Jasper.

=== Emergency/war ===
After World War II began, compulsory tillage affected a percentage of tilled land in the area. The only cars in the parish at the outbreak of war, belonged to the priest, the minister, Dinny John L O'Sullivan and Barry. The train took four hours to reach Cork. Coal was unavailable. The train stopped at each station to take on timber and turf.

The Luftwaffe flew weather reconnaissance aircraft over the area and used the lighthouse at Dursey Island as a landmark. The keepers got used to a Junkers plane that used to fly from Merignac near Bordeaux.

A German plane was hit by the Royal Navy's SS Major C and crashed into Cashelane Hill, Dunbeacon on 5 February 1941, killing five of its crew while one was taken prisoner. A German plane crash-landed on Mount Gabriel on 3 March 1942 killing all aboard. They were interred in Bentry Abbey. On 23 July 1943 another aircraft crashed on the island killing its crew of four. The National Library's Photographic Archive includes photographs taken by the Luftwaffe's aerial photographic wing of military barracks, the airport, railway stations and Dublin city centre.

=== Post-war ===
Emigration continued amid widespread poverty and stagnation, apart from a brief uplift in the late 1940s. As John Crowley and the then chairman of Drinagh Co-Op drove west passing ruined houses, the chairman remarked that it was only a matter of time before no one was left on the Peninsula. Political excitement was provided by a new political party Clann na Poblachta. Bottled gas, yellow for Kosangas and silver and red for Calor gas became available for cooking and lighting using a silk mantle. Some continued to use paraffin and Tilley lamps. In the late 1950s rural electrification brought electricity. Some residents distrusted electricity and insisted that poles and meters be removed.

The Land Project aimed to increase farm productivity by reclamation, drainage and better animal husbandry. Lorries carrying lime, sea sand, pipes and machinery supplied reclamation assisted by grants. Tractors appeared and older cattle breeds were replaced over with black Anglias became common.

=== 1960s ===
In the early 1960s, old cowhalachts (old houses/ruins) began to be rebuilt. Englishwoman Mrs. Burton redeveloped the cottage at Ahagouna Bridge, Tom Mahony's house, the O'Sullivan house both in Coomkeen and The Old Mill. In the mid-1960s, Gulf Oil built an oil storage complex on Whiddy Island. The complex started a boom, attracting workers to settle in the district. Local people acquired skills in construction and worked on major projects such as Pfizer's in Cork and Alcan Aluminium in Limerick. The first supertanker Universe Ireland arrived at Whiddy in October 1968. The tankers were serviced by four tugs, Bantry Bay, Dingle Bay, Brandon Bay, Tralee Bay. The terminal closed on 8 January 1979 when the Betelgeuse exploded, killing fifty people.

Tourism catered to English visitors in bed and breakfast inns and premises such as Ballyrooster House. The renewal of the troubles in Northern Ireland and competition from Spain crimped the industry.

== Historical economy ==
=== Quarries/mines ===
Rossmore slate quarry was owned by a Liverpool Company in 1865 with exports to England, Scotland and France. The quarry ceased operations in 1917. The remains of the powder store and tool shed are still visible. Friendly Cove Slate Quarry opened in the 1870s by Mr. Morris. Scart Barytes Mine supplied Harris paint factory in 1886. ore was exported in loads of 200–300 tons for porcelain manufacture. Rooska and Killeveenogue Silver and Lead Mine produced 65 tons of lead and 70 ounces of silver between 1849 and 1852, but ran out of capital. A quarry owned by Timothy McCarthy operated in 1912.

Dereenalomane Barytes Mine was originally worked as a copper mine Traill and Thomas in 1840, producing 19 tons of copper, before shifting to barium sulphate, a heavy white mineral, (used for paint, papermaking, etc.) Josiah Wedgwood used it for making pottery. Geologist T. D. Triphook, was involved in 1854 when it was known as the Bandon Barytes Mines. From 1860 the mine was managed by Charles Thomas, a Cornish Mining Captain, followed by George Ellis in the 1870s. From 1820 to 1920 intermittently when 2,500 tons were raised in 1851 compared to only 800 tons in three other centres in the former United Kingdom. The material was washed, dried, crushed and milled. It was packed into bags and sent to an island jetty in Dunmanus Bay by a 1.23 miles (1.98 km) aerial ropeway. In 1917 a major fire caused extensive damage including the underground workings. Although repairs were carried out the mine never reached its former output. Mining historian Grenville AJ Cole regarded it as the first in Ireland and one of the earliest in the world. The companies listed as having worked the mine were, Marty Dennis and Co., British Barytes Co., Durrus Barytes Co., Mount Gabriel Barytes and Umber Co., Irish Barytes and Umber Co., Dereenlomane, Barytes Mines Ltd., Dunmanus Barytes Mines Ltd.

=== Mill ===
The Moynihan family operated a water mill fed by a sluice from the Durrus River, starting at the Creamery and continuing to the Mill. It had extensive use during the Second World War. Moynihan was the headmaster in the school. In the 19th century there was also a scutch mill listed in Griffiths Valuations.

=== Markets and fairs ===
In 1912, butter markets operated on Wednesdays and Fridays near the present creamery. The main market was in Bantry with fair day the first Friday each month. The pig fair was held on a Thursday. In the early 20th century, Bantry celebrated the fourth largest fair in Ireland. The railway ran as many as eight carriages to carry cattle and pigs to Cork. The annual horse fair was Ballibui in August in Dunmanway. When the marts started, especially Bandon and Skibbereen (started by Cork Co-Operative Marts in 1958) it sounded the death knell of the cattle fair. Durrus Fair held near Creamery and was revived in 1937 after 20 years.

=== Dairy and creamery ===
By the mid-18th century, the dairy trade in the area sent butter to the Cork market, but the round trip by horse-drawn cart from Skibbereen could take eight days. In the 1730s, Cork merchants came to Bantry every summer, primarily in connection with the pilchard trade, but also to export butter. In addition, farmers and car men faced the hazards of highwaymen. Many did not use carts. This was evidenced by Sir John Carr in 1805, who wrote "peasants with horses carrying barrels of butter to Cork secured as usual with ropes of hay" and Sir Richard Colt Hoare in 1806, who said "numerous troops of pack horses conveying casks of salt butter from the interior to Cork".

Patrick and Andrew Gallwey of Bantry wrote in 1737 that the small cows in the district would have produced from half to two-thirds of a hundredweight of butter per annum. In the post-famine era, with consolidation of holdings and the collapse of grain prices with the passing of the Corn Laws, dairying assumed greater importance. The merchants would receive butter in amounts of 20 or 30 lb (14 kg) and salt and make it up to 56 lb (25 kg), the measure of a firkin, they would pay the same as applied in the Cork Butter Market.

The railway reduced the time to take butter to market by 75%. William Warner of Bantry, owned creameries at Killarney, Enniskeane and Ballinacarriga and developed butter aimed at the export market. In partnership with James Manders, who later left the partnership he started a factory at William Street, by 1886 its production was £6,000 in the summer and employed a hundred men including fifty coopers. Before the Land Acts that transferred ownership to tenants in the early-20th century, it was common for land to be worked by a combination of owner and dairyman. In one such case, the Sullivan dairy family at Moulivard and elsewhere agreed in 1897 to work lands at Rusheenisca.

By agreement of 13 January 1897 between Robert Phillips, Church House, Clowes, Worcestershire, England, and John Sullivan of Durrus, the owner agreed to give the milk and produce of 27 in-calf cows and any cows that the owner may buy, to make up the above number and calves, on or above 15 May 1898 for the Dairy Year of 1898. The dairyman was given liberty to graze six sheep, to grow potatoes for his own use and he was equipped with dairy utensils and a half tonne of bran. He was to be permitted to sow last year's tillage to oats and wheat for his own use, with the straw to be the owner's property. In return, the dairyman was to pay Phillips £6.15.0d. for each cow and the owner was to allow Sullivan £6.0s.0d. for properly protecting the hay. The dairyman was to pay the sum of £100 0s.0d., with the balance to be secured by a promissory note. Should the dairyman decide not to renew the dairy agreement for the year 1898, he was to be allowed such root crops.

A creamery was established in the area in the 1930s. It was largely built by cross-community voluntary labour. Work started in 1933 and it opened in the spring of 1934. Farmers gave a week at a time with horse and cart. Gravel was sourced from the strand and rock was quarried east of Ballycommane Road. It was necessary to register 1,000 cows and guarantee £1,000 over three years. McManaway was also involved in starting the creamery at Kilcrohane and Dunmanway and worked closely with Fr. McSweeney.

This creamery was opened before those at Caheragh, Kealkil and Bantry and apart from Durrus farmers, other suppliers from those areas delivered their milk on floats carrying 15 or more churns. Butter was sold to Jeremiah O'Sulivan's stores for 4d/lb and was packed in 56 lb (25 kg) boxes. It went by horse and cart to Durrus Road Station and then to Cork. The creamery operated as a general store where farmers could make purchases against their cheques. It purchased chickens and turkeys and supplied meal and other farm supplies.

=== Fisheries ===
In the 1960s and 1970s, a sea urchin fishery operated in Dunmanus Bay, at a point where the waters are shallow, which encouraged urchin growth. At different stages, four or five boats operated, and the urchins were picked from the seabed by divers. The urchins were sold on the French market live and were shipped through Cork Airport. The fishery was effectively wiped out with the sudden onset of red tide in the early eighties and by overharvesting, preventing regeneration. Kenmare Bay suffered a similar fate and urchin "fishing" is now unheard of in these bays.

Scallops were also harvested locally. In the 1940s, the catch was exported to the UK while an ever-increasing demand for seafood at home supported local fishermen in later years. Winkles have been harvested along the shores of Dunmanus Bay for many years, and in the past were purchased for the French market by a company operating from Crookhaven who stored them in ponds awaiting transportation. They were collected on a regular basis by truck.

== Petty sessions court ==
The courthouse is still in the village between O'Sullivans and the Sheep's Head public houses. These courts were set up in the early 19th century. Before that magistrates administered justice according to their whim. Fr. Collins Administrator of Skibbereen, giving evidence to select committees of the House of Lords and Commons in 1824 referred to 'presents' being given to the magistrates of corn, cattle money and having their turf cut. The government pressured the magistrates to hold the Petty Sessions in public with three or four sittings in March 1822. This was formalised under the Petty Sessions (Ireland) Act 1827 (7 & 8 Geo. 4. c. 67). The petty session's nearest modern equivalent is the District Court except that the Petty Sessions operated with the involvement of local prominent people with no legal qualifications. Under the Peace Preservation Act 1814 the resident magistrates appointed were generally strangers and therefore presumably immune to pressures applied to local magistrates.

== Churches ==
=== Catholic ===
It is believed a thatched church on the site of the Old Mill, now Cois Abhann was built around 1750. Mass Rocks church, one in Coomkeen in the lands of Timmy Whelly and one at Kealties. A church at Kealties was a thatched structure erected c.1780. The old Durrus Church at Moulivard was in use mid-17th century, but according to Brady was in ruins by 1699. Tradition located a church at Coolculachta. After the 1798 Rebellion and the arrival of the French Armada in Bantry the church was forced to close. The former church at Chapel Rock (on the site of the present National School) was built by Fr. Quinn in 1820 and was a slated structure. Fr. Richard Quinn arrived in the parish from Onoyne, in County Tipperary in 1818. In 1820 he started the parish register of births, marriages and deaths.

The church was replaced when the Church of the Sacred Heart was built in 1901. This was built on a site of 1-acre (4,000 m^{2}) by way of lease to Fr. O'Leary from the Earl of Bandon for 990 years at a rent of 10 shillings per annum. The first sod was cut by Dan Keohane and John Sullivan, Clonee. The contractor was Daniel O'Donovan, Bantry and the stone was provided from a quarry at Fahies, Clashadoo owned by the Shannon family and drawn to the site by Patrick Crowley of Ahagouna. The cost of the church was £2,900 and the Architect was Maurice Alphonsus Hennessy from the South Mall, Cork A mural tablet to the Blair family of Blairscove and outside a Celtic Cross is a memorial to the Tobin family in Irish and English.

The Stations are an old tradition going back to Penal times. In each townland families in turn rotated to have mass in the house where the parish dues were taken. It was and is a time of great preparation with help from neighbours in the preparations. A wax candle blessed on Candlemas Day 2 February was used.

=== Church of Ireland ===
Brady mentions a church and chancel in Durrus in 1615 and the Rector Thomas Barnam says in 1639 that it was in good condition unlike the one in Kilcrohane. The Cork Directory of 1875 mentions a ruined church near Durrus Court. On 27 November 1792 by order of the Lord Lieutenant in Council the parishes of Kilcrohan, Durrus and Kilmacomoge were divided and the new parish of Durrus and Kilcrohan were created. St. James, Church of Ireland, built 1792, at a cost of £461 10s. 9.25d. The aisle was rebuilt following collapse. A south aisle was added in 1867 design by William Atkins.

The Rectory (Glebe) was built by the Rev. Edward Jones Alcock in 1831, following Glebe at Cappanahola. Licensed places of Worship in Glenlough and Rooska (1852–1866) were in schoolhouses. In 1935 the entrance was widened, railings were erected and gates were added. This work was done by Dick Gay and Eddie Brooks and paid for by a former parishioner Mr. Hosford, resident in England. In 1940 the Vestry Room was built. In 1949 gas lighting was installed followed by electricity in the early 1960s. In 1989 extensive renovations were carried out. A parochial hall was built partly by voluntary labour at the Rectory and opened on 22 August 1951. The new Rectory was completed in 1965. The parishes of Durrus and Kilcrohane seem to have been separated between 1634 and 1639, but reunited by 1663.

Some of the services and sermons were conducted in Irish c. 1850 when the Rev. Crosthwaite's services were attended by thirty converts and several poor Protestants who traveled six to ten miles to attend the Parish Church. Rooska Church was built 1866 to a design of William Atkins. This Church closed in January 1988.

=== Methodist ===
The Methodist church was built in 1827 as Four Mile Water Church Hall in village. The last church on the Dunbeacon Road, it was built c. 1930 and closed in the early 1950s. Durrus was part of the Skibereen circuit that included the Berehaven Mines, Fivemile Water, Durrus and Drimoleague, with a Minister resident in Bantry. Methodist families included two Brooks and Kingstons in Dromreagh, Vickeries in Ballycomane and Rooska and Millars in Coolcolacta.

=== Catholic Four Mile Water ===
An application to register the female school was made in 1853, 1860 and 1865. The latter succeeded but the school was struck off in 1880 and restored later. The male school applied in 1868 and 1883. In 1868, a 17-year-old assistant teacher, John Leary was present. The monitor, John Canty resigned in September 1868. The principal was Denis Leary who taught 3rd. class. 97 pupils enrolled with an average attendance of 63.3–64.8. The manager was Fr. O'Flynn PP. The 1875 student body include 131 boys and 161 girls.

=== Church of Ireland schools ===
These schools remained outside the National School system until later in the 19th century and were supported by the Church Education Society In the 1840s the Rev. Crosthwaithe received support for schools from the Coast and Islands Society which continued until near the end of the century.

=== Aughagoheen Church of Ireland ===
Rev. William O'Grady on a "Bantry Club" letterhead wrote seeking the entry of Aughagoheen into the National System. It had been under the Church Education Society (founded 1839) whose involvement would finish upon recognition. The patrons were O'Grady and EE Leigh White Esq. He proposed to provide privies and that George Patison aged 18.5 would be the teacher and live in a parish house provided. An inspection disclosed school hours of 10 am to 2:30 pm with religion 2–2:30. The school enrolled 16 pupils: nine males and six females. Annie Stephens later applied to teach. She had been a monitor at Carrigbui up to third class and was in sole charge for ten months (this may have been Durrus C of I school). She would be eligible to substitute and was to go for training later. The file indicated that the school was unable to supplement the teacher's salary. O'Grady proposed to later pay £10 in addition to the state salary. Stephens was prepared to work without a local subvention. The appointment went instead to Susanna Perrott, aged 20. From 1 September 1902, she had trained at the Church of Ireland College at Kildare Street. The school was expected to have 29-plus pupils, including two from Scart Catholic School which at that time had attendance averaging between 24.9 and 38.4. After recognition the roll was 17 boys and six girls and the attendance ranged between 10.0 and 18.5. Rebecca Kingston resigned as teacher from 10 March 1910 and it was suggested that the school close and that the students would go to Bantry at a conveyance cost of £63 per annum. O'Grady appealed this on hardship grounds, pointing out that many of the children had to come up side roads. The Inspector conducted an enquiry looking at the distances the children had to travel and suggested that the school stay open. The family names of the children were Swanton (three families), Love, Foley, Jago, Sullivan, Shannon and Deane. Florence M. Clarke resigned on 28 August 1914 replaced by Ella Newman (she had been a junior literary mistress in Bantry from 8 August 1911). Newman had trained at St. Mary's Shandon and passed the relevant exam and was given provisional recognition from 22 October 1915.

=== Church of Ireland Durrus ===
The original school at Clashadoo was built c.1780. In 1875 60 pupils were enrolled. It was replaced by the school at Ahagouna in 1937 after a diphtheria epidemic killing several children. This school cost £1,600. A second teacher was employed. This school in turn is to be replaced by a new school under construction only in 2006 on an adjoining site acquired from John McCarthy. Schools also operated at Rooska and Dunbeacon. In 1947–50 school transport was provided by Lottie Dukelow by pony and trap. Earlier Bert Dukelow provided transport with a horse and trap for the children on the south side of the bay.

=== Rooska School ===
Rev. Pratt applied for recognition as a National School in 1898. The old school was built around 1822/1823 when Captain White gave a permanent lease. The school was inspected on 9 February 1898. He reported the building in fair condition, one room, no privies, stone and mortar and drew attention to needed improvements. Other nearby schools were Gurtalasa, Four Mile Water, Durrus, Bantry, Whiddy, Rusnacaharagh and Morragh (Methodist Durrus). Normally a school would have to be more than three miles (5 km) from another school but in this case the application was approved from 1 January 1898 in the exceptional circumstance of a mountain range preventing children from attending. The school had been supported by the Island and Coast Society £20, The Church Education Society £7, The Diocesan Board £5 and the Manager £3. The roll was 12 boys and 6 girls.

=== Cashelane Church of Ireland School ===
Rev. R. H. Carroll the Manager of Altar Rectory, Toormore, applied for a grant to build a school. The mixed school would have 30 children. In 1902 the average attendance was 10.7–11. The nearby Catholic School at Dunbeacon had an average attendance of 54.8–68.3, and included 11 Established Church children and had an assistant teacher. Ms. Trinder, who had qualified from the Church of Ireland College in 1894 and had taught at Kilcoe/Corrovally was appointed. The new manager was Rev. A. J. Brady as the school was now in his parish. In October 1906 the attendance was 10 boys and 10 girls.

=== Methodist ===
The Methodist school at Morragh applied to become a National School in 1882 and 1883. The site was leased from Richard Tonson Evans 1 May 1862 by way of a "lease of three lives" (a lease that continues as long as all three of the leaseholders survive.) In 1907 the school merged with the Church of Ireland school in Durrus. Only 4 of the 30 pupils were Methodist.

=== Church Society schools ===
Schools at Knockroe, Gearhies and Gortalassa employed Irish-speaking teachers including Seamus O'Suilleabhain of the Ui Shuilleabhain Fachdnaidh at Bonane near Kenmare. It is believed that the Irish Society was active in this regard.

=== Secondary school ===
The Mercy Order started a school for girls in 1863, initially on a National School Curriculum. The curriculum later expanded to include bookkeeping, agriculture, horticulture, mechanical drawing, dressmaking and cookery. Art, craft and design vocal, choral and instrumental music and song were included. Children were prepared for civil service exams and trained as monitors who would teach in the National Schools. The Intermediate Course started in 1911 and in 1927 a Secondary "top" was attached to the National School. In 1878 the two schools became distinct and the convent school was the only one in the area to provide full-time second-level education. In the absence of transport the secondary school was of limited use to children in outlying areas such as Durrus.

== Recreation ==
=== Patterns ===
In the 18th and early 19th century "patterns" at holy wells or at Gougan Barra were very popular. In theory these were religious, but in practice they were a form of recreation. In 1813, folklorist Thomas Crofton Croker (1798–1854) attended a pattern at Gougan Barra on St.John's Eve. Large crowds gathered along the lakeshore and in and around the chapels. Penitents inside were on their knees, some with arms uplifted praying aloud others counting rosary beads or using a small pebble or cutting notches on a stick to indicate the number of prayers to be repeated. A rusty piece of iron was passed from one pilgrim to the next and placed on the head three times, accompanied by a prayer.

A man belonging to a mendicant order scratched the wall of the well with a piece of slate, following the imprint of the cross. The pieces of slate were sold to pilgrims afterwards as relics. Inside the door of the well seven or eight people were in the water exhibiting their sores. Outside little bottles of glass water were sold and applied to an infected part. Women waited with naked infants to dip them into the well waters.

Tented merchants sold whiskey, porter and bread. In most tents a piper played and young people danced, the women choosing the partner. Twenty or thirty people were in each tent, drinking heavily and singing rebellious songs that were greeted with howls of approval. By evening most were drunk, cudgels were brandished amid general mayhem. Attendees unleashed a confused uproar of prayers and oaths of sanctity and blasphemy sounded in the same instant of the ear. The Bishop of Cork, Dr. John Murphy banned the Gougan pattern in 1818. The Protestant clergyman Caesar Otway (1780–1842) visited in 1827 and counted 936 Paters, Aves and Credos.

=== Athletics ===
In the post-famine era dejection led to mass emigration. By the 1870s extant works offer many references to races, weight throwing and events in Kilcrohane and Ahakista. It was common for people to cross Dunmanus Bay for events on the other side or to meet half way in Carbery Island.

=== Bowling ===
The introduction of flax in the mid-18th century followed by the introduction of weaving families from the north of Ireland may have introduced bowling to West Cork. With the improvement in the roads in the late 19th century it begins to register in the folklore with names such as Skuse of Brahalish and Barrett of Colomane mentioned.

=== Music ===
In the 1850s, when Francis O'Neill (Irish Music collector) was a child, many musicians played in his parents' house. In Durrus, Nell Burke Coomkeen, played the melodian in her younger days. In the 1930s the Station Heights in Dunbeacon was a centre for dancing and music in particular the Daly house. Music was supplied by the two Mahony Brothers. A wooden platform on Dunbeacon crossroads for dancing was in use over the weekend and put away on Sunday night.

In the early 1960s or the late 1950s, Eugene Wiseman formed a five-piece dance band that became very popular known as "The Roving Serenaders". Pete Sullivan, Bill Cotter, Mary Minehane and Michael Cotter on vocals were the mainstays. Wiseman created another band called "The Fastnet Five" performing all over the county.

== Transportation ==
=== Bus ===
Before the extension of the railway from Drimoleague to Bantry, a coach service was provided from Bandon to Bantry. Travel time by train and coach from Cork to Bantry was approximately 6½ hours. The fare was 4s.

=== Steamer ===
A steamer service operated between Cork and Dingle, between the late 1850s and 1905. The Clyde Shipping Company took over this service in 1876, calling at Bantry to pick up pig and millstuffs.

=== Rail ===
As early as 1836, consulting engineer Charles Vignoles put forward a scheme to the Railway Commission for a trunk line from Dublin to Cork, including a branch running from Blarney through Macroom and Glengarriff to Castletownebere. The report, however, made no mention of the line to service West Cork. A Company proposed a line from Cork to Bandon in 1845 and in 1846, which included a projected line to Bantry. Work commenced in November 1879, opening for business in 1881. In the line's heyday in the early 20th century, four services traveled each day to and from Cork.

The line became an important link in the "Prince of Wales Route" from Cork to Killarney via Bantry and Glengarriff. In 1902 the company opened a circular route from Bantry to Dunmanus Bay. Inclusive fares were 13s.6d. First Class, 12s.0d. Second Class, and 10s.0d Third Class, to include luncheon at Ahakista Hotel and tea at Bantry. To encourage tourism, the Local Development Syndicate (which had acquired the coaching business of Vickery of Bantry) agreed to do the coach and provide refreshments at 7/- a head. The Company agreed to provide a special train to Bantry and back and to contribute half the cost of the refreshments.

The line suffered significantly during the Troubles and Civil War. In an ambush on the train at Upton on 15 February 1921, six were killed, and two days later Scart Bridge was blown up, stopping service west of Drimoleague. On 7 August 1922, (the Civil War had started in June 1922) Chetwynd Viaduct was severely damaged by explosives. Service to Bantry resumed only in April 1923. Signal Cabins and Staff Instruments were destroyed by fire at Durrus Road Station.

With the introduction of a diesel locomotive in 1954, passenger numbers increased from 20 to between 80 and 130. However, a policy of closing rail lines, and the loss of the Bandon section along with financial losses £91,000 stg., which together with the prevailing mood at the time, ended the entire West Cork system. The last train went from Bantry to Cork on Good Friday, 31 March 1961.
