= 2023 Carbery Junior A Football Championship =

Annual Gaelic football competition season

- Dates: 29 July - 17 December 2023
- Teams: 16
- Sponsor: Bandon Co-Op
- Champions: Barryroe (1st title); David O'Sullivan (captain); Paudie Hurley (manager)
- Runners-up: Kilmacabea; Diarmuid O'Callaghan (captain); Shane Crowley (manager)
- Relegated: Bandon

Tournament statistics
- Matches played: 31
- Goals scored: 77 (2.48 per match)
- Points scored: 617 (19.9 per match)

The 2023 Carbery Junior A Football Championship was the 98th staging of the Carbery Junior A Football Championship since its establishment by the West Cork Board in 1926. The draw for the group stage placings took place on 8 December 2022. The championship ran from 29 July to 17 December 2023.

The final was played on 27 October 2023 at Sam Maguire Park in Dunmanway, between Barryroe and Kilmacabea, in what was their first ever meeting in the final. Barryroe won the match by 1–12 to 0–14 to claim their first ever championship title.

== Group 1 ==
=== Group 1 table ===
Knockout stage

Team	Matches				Score			Pts
Team	Pld	W	D	L	For	Against	Diff	Pts
Tadhg Mac Carthaigh	3	3	0	0	51	29	22	6
Castlehaven	3	2	0	1	48	36	12	4
Randal Óg	3	1	0	2	43	43	0	2
Diarmuid Ó Mathúna's	3	0	0	3	33	67	-34	0

=== Group 1 results ===
28 July 2023 Round 1	Tadhg Mac Carthaigh	0-11 - 0-10	Randal Óg	Aughaville Grounds
	B O'Driscoll 0-3, L Burke 0-2, P Burke 0-2, O Daly 0-1, E O'Donovan 0-1, C O'Driscoll 0-1, S McCarthy 0-1.		P Collins 0-3, G White 0-2, C O'Neill 0-1, C Duggan 0-1, K Dullea 0-1, P White 0-1, D Collins 0-1.

30 July 2023 Round 1	Diarmuid Ó Mathúna's	1-08 - 2-13	Castlehaven	Aughaville Grounds
			S Nolan 1-5, G Casey 1-1, C Nolan 0-3, C O'Driscoll 0-2, J Walsh 0-1, K O'Donovan 0-1.

19 August 2023 Round 2	Randal Óg	3-11 - 1-10	Diarmuid Ó Mathúna's	Sam Maguire Park
	G White 2-0, D Collins 1-2, P Collins 0-4, C O'Neill 0-2, B O'Driscoll 0-1, S Daly 0-1, P White 0-1.		J O'Callaghan 0-7, C O'Sullivan 1-1, T Lordan 0-1, K O'Donovan 0-1.

20 August 2023 Round 2	Tadhg Mac Carthaigh	0-12 - 1-07	Castlehaven	Páirc Tadhg na Samhna

8 September 2023 Round 3	Randal Óg	1-10 - 1-16	Castlehaven	Aughaville Grounds
	P Collins 1-2, D Collins 0-2, B O'Driscoll 0-1, C Duggan 0-1, G White 0-1, K Dullea 0-1, Séadhna Crowley 0-1, Séamus Crowley 0-1.		K O'Donovan 1-4, C O'Driscoll 0-5, P O'Brien 0-3, J Walsh 0-2, S Nolan 0-2.

10 September 2023 Round 3	Tadhg Mac Carthaigh	5-13 - 0-09	Diarmuid Ó Mathúna's	Rossmore Grounds

== Group 2 ==
=== Group 2 table ===
Knockout stage

Team	Matches				Score			Pts
Team	Pld	W	D	L	For	Against	Diff	Pts
Ballinascarthy	3	2	1	0	41	36	5	5
Carbery Rangers	3	1	1	1	30	42	-12	3
Newcestown	3	1	0	2	45	46	-1	2
Kilbrittain	3	1	0	2	41	33	8	2

=== Group 2 results ===
30 July 2023 Round 1	Ballinascarthy	0-11 - 1-08	Carbery Rangers	Páirc Uinsinn
	Cillian Cullinane 0-6, D Twomey 0-2, D O'Brien 0-1, C O'Brien 0-1, B O'Donovan 0-1.		C Twomey 0-5, C O'Mahony 1-0, C Hayes 0-1, B Lenihan 0-1, E Browne 0-1.

30 July 2023 Round 1	Kilbrittain	2-08 - 3-07	Newcestown	Timoleague Grounds
	S Sexton 1-1, T Sheehan 1-0, J O'Donovan 0-3, B Butler 0-1, S Dewey 0-1, F Ustianowski 0-1, A Holland 0-1.		E Kenneally 2-4, D McSweeney 1-0, M Kelly 0-2, C O'Donovan 0-1.

19 August 2023 Round 2	Carbery Rangers	0-05 - 3-09	Kilbrittain	Páirc Uí Mhurchú
	C O'Donovan 0-2, B Linehan 0-2, K Eady 0-1.		J O'Donovan 1-5, P Wall 1-0, S Shorten 1-0, C Hogan 0-2, C Ustianowski 0-2.

20 August 2023 Round 2	Ballinascarthy	2-12 - 2-10	Newcestown	Ballinacarriga Grounds

9 September 2023 Round 3	Carbery Rangers	1-11 - 1-10	Newcestown	Páirc Uinsinn
	J O'Regan 0-6, C Twomey 1-0, C O'Donovan 0-2, P Hurley 0-2, S O'Mahony 0-1.		J Meade 1-5, D Brady 0-2, C O'Donovan 0-1, P Collins 0-1, T Horgan 0-1.

10 September 2023 Round 3	Ballinascarthy	1-09 - 1-06	Kilbrittain	Páirc Naomh Eoin
	C O'Brien 1-1, Cillian Cullinane 0-3, E Ferguson 0-2, S Ryan 0-1, B O'Donovan 0-1, P Cullianane 0-1.		B Butler 1-1, C Ustianowski 0-2, J O'Donovan 0-2, C Hogan 0-1.

== Group 3 ==
=== Group 3 table ===
Knockout stage

Team	Matches				Score			Pts
Team	Pld	W	D	L	For	Against	Diff	Pts
Kilmacabea	3	3	0	0	55	20	35	6
Argideen Rangers	3	1	1	1	38	26	12	3
Kilmeen	3	1	1	1	37	36	1	3
Bandon	3	0	0	3	17	65	-48	0

=== Group 3 results ===
29 July 2023 Round 1	Argideen Rangers	0-07 - 0-13	Kilmacabea	Rosscarbery Grounds
	L O'Leary 0-3, J Crowley 0-1, D Holland 0-1, C Lehane 0-1.		D Gore 0-5, I Jennings 0-3, O Tobin 0-2, D McCarthy 0-1, R Hourihane 0-1, E Shanahan 0-1.

30 July 2023 Round 1	Kilmeen	1-14 - 1-08	Bandon	St Mary's Park
	B Carmody 1-1, J O'Donovan 0-4, O O'Sullivan 0-3, J Bailey 0-2, D Coakley 0-2, B Deasy 0-1, C Murphy 0-1.		C Long 0-5, D Collis 1-1, N McCarthy 0-1, R O'Driscoll 0-1.

20 August 2023 Round 2	Argideen Rangers	2-16 - 0-04	Bandon	Castletown-Kinneigh Grounds
	B Fleming 1-5, D Holland 1-3, L O'Leary 0-4, P Butler 0-1, A Guinevan 0-1, F Butler 0-1.

20 August 2023 Round 2	Kilmacabea	2-10 - 0-11	Kilmeen	Rosscarbery Grounds
	D McCarthy 1-2, I Jennings 0-4, K McCarthy 1-0, D Gore 0-1, E Shanahan 0-1, R Hourihane 0-1, K Whelton 0-1.		O O'Sullivan 0-5, J O'Donovan 0-2, K Keohane 0-2, S Buttimer 0-1, D O'Regan 0-1.

8 September 2023 Round 3	Kilmacabea	4-14 - 0-02	Bandon	Páirc Uí Mhurchú
	D O'Sullivan 2-2, I Jennings 0-6, L McCarthy 1-1, O Tobin 1-1, C McCarthy 0-2, D McCarthy 0-1, E Shanahan 0-1.		B Donegan 0-1, A O'Reilly 0-1.

9 September 2023 Round 3	Argideen Rangers	0-09 - 0-09	Kilmeen	Ahamilla Grounds
	D Holland 0-5, C Lehane 0-1, L O'Leary 0-1, S Walsh 0-1, B Fleming 0-1.		O O'Sullivan 0-4, D O'Sullivan 0-1, C Murphy 0-1, J O'Donovan 0-1, Ó Scannell 0-1, J Bailey 0-1.

== Group 4 ==
=== Group 4 table ===
Knockout stage

Team	Matches				Score			Pts
Team	Pld	W	D	L	For	Against	Diff	Pts
Barryroe	3	3	0	0	61	30	31	6
St Colum's	3	1	0	2	43	39	4	2
St Mary's	3	1	0	2	42	54	-12	2
Clonakilty	3	1	0	2	37	60	-23	2

=== Group 4 results ===
29 July 2023 Round 1	St Mary's	1-06 - 3-13	Barryroe	Páirc Uinsinn
	O Corcoran 1-4, D O'Donovan 0-1, R Baggott 0-1.		R O'Donovan 2-6, O O'Donovan 1-4, D Ó Buachalla 0-2, T Ó Buachalla 0-1.

30 July 2023 Round 1	Clonakilty	2-09 - 0-12	St Colum's	Páirc Tadhg na Samhna
	J Cowhig 1-4, F Murphy 1-1, S Collins 0-2, T McCarthy 0-1, D O'Sullivan 0-1.		C O'Connor 0-3, T Cronin 0-3, R O'Connor 0-2, D Andrews 0-2, M Hurley 0-1, J McSweeney 0-1.

20 August 2023 Round 2	St Mary's	1-09 - 3-11	St Colum's	Aughaville Grounds
	O Corcoran 1-7, D O'Donovan 0-2.		D Andrews 2-3, T Cronin 1-1, R O'Connor 0-3, D McSweeney 0-2, M Hurley 0-1, C O'Connor 0-1.

20 August 2023 Round 2	Barryroe	3-18 - 1-07	Clonakilty	Páirc Uinsinn
	D Ó Buachalla 2-3, O O'Donovan 0-8, R O'Donovan 1-3, B O'Donovan 0-2, T Ó Buachalla 0-1, A McSweeney 0-1.

8 September 2023 Round 3	Clonakilty	1-09 - 3-12	St Mary's	Rossmore Grounds
	S Collins 1-5, A Cullinane 0-1, B White 0-1, J Campbell 0-1, J Cowhig 0-1.		O Corcoran 0-9, D O'Donovan 1-2, D Scannell 1-0, R Baggott 1-0, A O'Driscoll 0-1.

10 September 2023 Round 3	Barryroe	0-12 - 1-08	St Colum's	Ballinacarriga Grounds
	R O'Donovan 0-6, O O'Donovan 0-3, B O'Donovan 0-1, S Holland 0-1, D Ó Buachalla 0-1.

== Knockout stage ==
=== Relegation playoff ===
17 December 2024 Playoff	Diarmuid Ó Mathúna's	w/o - scr.	Bandon	Páirc Naomh Eoin
		Report

=== Quarter-finals ===
23 September 2023 Quarter-final	Barryroe	1-08 - 0-08 (aet)	Castlehaven	St James' Park
	O O'Donovan 1-3, R O'Donovan 0-4, B O'Donovan 0-1.		D Whelton 0-3, S Nolan 0-3, J Walsh 0-1, P O'Brien 0-1.

24 September 2023 Quarter-final	Ballinascarthy	1-07 - 1-06	Argideen Rangers	Páirc Uí Mhurchú
	B O'Donovan 0-4, G O'Leary 1-0, E Ferguson 0-1, C O'Brien 0-1, D Twomey 0-1.		D Harrington 1-0, L O'Leary 0-2, C Lehane 0-1, JM O'Callaghan 0-1, B Fleming 0-1, D Holland 0-1.

1 October 2023 Quarter-final	Tadhg Mac Carthaigh	2-10 - 1-04	St Colum's	Sam Maguire Park
	P Burke 1-2, D Murray 0-4, O Daly 1-0, S McCarthy 0-2, C Hegarty 0-1, B O'Driscoll 0-1.		JB O'Connell 1-0, C O'Connor 0-2, R O'Connor 0-1, D Andrews 0-1.

1 October 2023 Quarter-final	Kilmacabea	1-15 - 1-12	Carbery Rangers	Rossmore Grounds
	D Gore 0-10, D O'Sullivan 1-0, D McCarthy 0-2, R Shanahan 0-1, D O'Donovan 0-1, C McCarthy 0-1.		J O'Regan 0-10, M Mennis 1-0, B Linehan 0-1, C O'Donovan 0-1.

=== Semi-finals ===
22 October 2023 Semi-final	Tadhg Mac Carthaigh	0-08 - 1-13	Kilmacabea	Rossa Park
	D Murray 0-5, T Keating 0-1, P Burke 0-1, E O'Donovan 0-1.		I Jennings 0-4, L McCarthy 1-0, E Shanahan 0-2, D Gore 0-2, C McCarthy 0-2, D McCarthy 0-1, R Shanahan 0-1, D O'Donovan 0-1.

22 October 2023 Semi-final	Barryroe	5-10 - 1-11 (aet)	Ballinascarthy	St Mary's Park
	O O'Donovan 1-2, R O'Donovan 0-5, B O'Donovan 1-1, S Holland 1-1, M Crowley 1-1, T Ó Buachalla 1-0.		Conall Cullinane 1-4, B O'Donovan 0-4, E Ferguson 0-2, Cillian Cullinane 0-1.

=== Final ===
27 October 2023 Final	Barryroe	1-12 - 0-14 (aet)	Kilmacabea	Sam Maguire Park
	R O’Donovan 1-8 (0-3 frees), O O’Donovan, R Crowley, B Donovan, A McSweeney 0-1 each.	Report	D Gore 0-11 (0-5 frees, 0-1 mark), I Jennings 0-2, D O’Donovan 0-1.	Referee: S Scanlon (Newcestown)

== Championship statistics ==
=== Top scorers ===
Rank	Player	Club	Tally	Total	Matches	Average
1	Ryan O'Donovan	Barryroe	4-32	44	6	7.33
2	Olan O'Donovan	Barryroe	3-21	30	6	5.00
3	Damien Gore	Kilmacabea	0-29	29	5	5.80
