= Cork Junior B Football Championship =

Annual Irish Gaelic football competition

- Irish: Craobh Peile Shóisearach B Chorcaí
- Code: Gaelic football
- Founded: 1984; 42 years ago
- Region: Cork (GAA)
- No. of teams: 14
- Title holders: Clann na nGael (2nd title)
- Most titles: Argideen Rangers (4 titles)
- Sponsors: Bon Secours

The Cork Junior B Football Championship (known for sponsorship reasons as the Bon Secours Cork Junior B Football Championship and abbreviated to the Cork JBFC) is an annual Gaelic football competition organised by the Cork County Board of the Gaelic Athletic Association and contested by junior clubs in the county of Cork in Ireland. It is the seventh tier overall in the entire Cork football championship system.

The Cork Junior B Championship was introduced as a knockout tournament in 1984. In its current format, the championship is completed over the course of ten weeks. Unlike the Cork Junior A Football Championship, it is a countywide competition not limited to divisional champions. The championship includes a round robin followed by a knockout stage, which culminates with the final match at Páirc Uí Rinn.

The competition has been won by 27 teams, eight of which have won it more than once. Argideen Rangers are the most successful team in the competition's history, having won it four times.

== Format ==
=== Group stage ===
The 12 teams are divided into two groups of four and two groups of three. Over the course of the group stage, each team plays once against the others in the group. Two points are awarded for a win, one for a draw and zero for a loss. The teams are ranked in the group stage table by points gained, then scoring difference and then their head-to-head record. The top two teams in each group qualify for the knockout stage.

=== Knockout stage ===
Quarter-finals: The eight qualifying teams from the group stage contest this round. The four winners from these four games advance to the semi-finals.

Semi-finals: The four quarter-final winners contest this round. The two winners from these four games advance to the semi-finals.

Final: The two semi-final winners contest the final. The winning team are declared champions.

== Teams ==
=== 2026 Teams ===
Team	Location	Division	Colours	In Championship since	Championship titles	Last championship title
Araglen	Araglen	Avondhu	Green and white	2022	0	—
Ballinacurra	Ballinacurra	Imokilly	Green and white	2025	0	—
Belgooly	Belgooly	Carrigdhoun	White and blue	2025	1	2011
Brian Dillons	Montenotte	Seandún	Blue and white	2025	0	—
Castlelyons	Castlelyons	Imokilly	Green and gold	2026	2	2014
Clann na nGael	Drimoleague	Carbery	Green, white and black	2022	2	2026
Doneraile	Doneraile	Avondhu	Red and green	2026	0	—
Garnish	Allihies	Beara	Green and yellow	2020	0	—
Glengarriff	Glengarriff	Beara	Green and red	2017	1	1999
Muintir Bháire	Durrus	Carbery	Maroon and white	2023	1	2003
Tracton	Tracton	Carrigdhoun	Green and red	2026	0	—

== Sponsorship ==
In keeping with its sponsorship deal for all Cork hurling and football championships, Permanent TSB provided the sponsorship since 1994. The Evening Echo became the primary sponsors of all Cork hurling and football championships in 2005. In July 2020, Bon Secours Hospital were unveiled as the title sponsor of all of Cork's Gaelic football competitions.

== Roll of honour ==
#	Team	Titles	Runners-up	Years won	Years runners-up
1	Argideen Rangers	4	0	1993, 2001, 2008, 2017	—
2	Kilbrin	3	2	1985, 1996, 2010	2017, 2020
2	Diarmuid Ó Mathúna's	3	0	1995, 2012, 2022	—
2	St Oliver Plunketts	3	0	1990, 2007, 2023	—
5	Kilmeen	2	2	1984, 2015	2012, 2014
5	Kilbrittain	2	0	1992, 2009	—
5	Castlelyons	2	0	1989, 2014	—
5	Dripsey	2	0	2005, 2020	—
5	Rathpeacon	1	2	1991	2003, 2004
5	Charleville	1	2	2013	2010, 2011
5	Grange	1	2	2019	2015, 2018
5	Ballyphehane	1	2	2025	2023, 2024
5	Glengarriff	1	1	1999	1997
5	Belgooly	1	1	2011	2002
5	Ballyhooly	1	1	2016	2001
5	Ballinacurra	1	1	2018	2013
5	Randal Óg	1	1	2021	1999
5	Ballinure	1	0	1986	—
5	Inniscarra	1	0	1987	—
5	Abbey Rovers	1	0	1988	—
5	Kilmacabea	1	0	1994	—
5	St Colum's	1	0	1997	—
5	Rathluirc Rovers	1	0	1998	—
5	Liscarroll	1	0	2000	—
5	Barryroe	1	0	2002	—
5	Muintir Bháire	1	0	2003	—
5	St Mary's	1	0	2004	—
5	Clann na nGael	2	0	2006, 2026	—
28	Awbeg Rangers	0	3	—	1984, 1987, 1991
28	Kilworth	0	2	—	1985, 1995
28	Freemount	0	2	—	1992, 1998
28	Araglen	0	2	—	2005, 2008
28	Russell Rovers	0	2	—	1986, 2009
28	Goleen	0	2	—	2019, 2021
28	Ilen Rovers	0	1	—	1988
28	Whitechurch	0	1	—	1989
28	Burton Rovers	0	1	—	1990
28	Killavullen	0	1	—	1993
28	Lough Rovers	0	1	—	1994
28	Carrignavar	0	1	—	1996
28	Lyre	0	1	—	2000
28	Churchtown	0	1	—	2006
28	Passage	0	1	—	2007
28	Cobh	0	1	—	2016
28	Fr. O'Neill's	0	1	—	2022

== List of finals ==
Year	Winners		Runners-up		#
Year	Club	Score	Club	Score	#
2026	Clan na Gael	0-11	Tracton	0-08	
2025	Ballyphehane	9-06	Araglen	3-07	
2024	Goleen	0-11	Ballyphehane	0-09	
2023	St Oliver Plunkett's	1–10	Ballyphehane	1–09	
2022	Diarmuid Ó Mathúna's	2–13	Fr. O'Neill's	1–09	
2021	Randal Og	2–10	Goleen	1–06	
2020	Dripsey	3–14	Kilbrin	1–09	
2019	Grange	2–04	Goleen	0–07	
2018	Ballinacurra	3–11	Grange	2–07	
2017	Argideen Rangers	3–13	Kilbrin	3–07	
2016	Ballyhooly	2–11	Cobh	1–08	
2015	Kilmeen	5–14	Grange	0–05	
2014	Castlelyons	1–06	Kilmeen	0–07	
2013	Charleville	0–06	Ballinacurra	0–05	
2012	Diarmuid Ó Mathúna's	2–09	Kilmeen	0–09	
2011	Belgooly	2–14	Charleville	1–08	
2010	Kilbrin	1–07	Charleville	1–05	
2009	Kilbrittain	2–11	Russell Rovers	0–09	
2008	Argideen Rangers	0–09	Araglen	1–02	
2007	St Oliver Plunkett's	1–13	Passage	2–07	
2006	Clan na Gael	1–14	Churchtown	0–09	
2005	Dripsey	1–09	Araglen	0–05	
2004	St Mary's	2–10	Rathpeacon	0–08	
2003	Muintir Bháire	3–11	Rathpeacon	0–12	
2002	Barryroe	2–11	Belgooly	0–04	
2001	Argideen Rangers	1–15	Ballyhooly	1–09	
2000	Liscarroll	1–13	Lyre	0–03	
1999	Glengarriff	2–09	Randal Óg	1–07	
1998	Rathluirc Rovers	1–06	Freemount	0–04	
1997	St. Colum's	0–11	Glengarriff	0–05	
1996	Kilbrin	2–10	Carrignavar	1–07	
1995	Diarmuid Ó Mathúna's	2–09	Kilworth	2–05	
1994	Kilmacabea	0–13	Lough Rovers	1–03	
1993	Argideen Rangers	1–17	Killavullen	0–06	
1992	Kilbrittain	3–10	Freemount	0–08	
1991	Rathpeacon	0–10	Awbeg Rangers	1–06	
1990	St. Oliver Plunkett's	1–06	Burton Rovers	0–07	
1989	Castlelyons	3–04	Whitechurch	1–09	
1988	Abbey Rovers	1–06	Ilen Rovers	0–06	
1987	Inniscarra	1–07	Awbeg Rangers	0–04	
1986	Ballinure	1–06	Russell Rovers	1–03	
1985	Kilbrin	0–06	Kilworth	0–02	
1984	Kilmeen	0–12	Awbeg Rangers	0–07	

Notes:

- 1988 - The first match ended in a draw: Abbey Rovers 0-08, Ilen Rovers 0-08.
- 2016 - The first match ended in a draw: Ballyhooly 1-13, Cobh 2-10.
- 2018 - The first match ended in a draw: Ballinacurra 0-11, Grange 1-08.

== See also ==
- Cork Junior B Hurling Championship
