= List of townlands of the barony of Ibane and Barryroe =

This is a sortable table of the townlands in the barony of Ibane and Barryroe, County Cork, Ireland. Duplicate names occur where there is more than one townland with the same name in the barony, and also where a townland is known by two alternative names. Names marked in bold typeface are towns and villages, and the word Town appears for those entries in the area column.

== Townland list ==
Townland	Area (acres)	Barony	Civil parish	Poor law union
Abbeymahon	526	Ibane and Barryroe	Abbeymahon	Clonakilty
Agha	224	Ibane and Barryroe	Lislee	Clonakilty
Aghafore	307	Ibane and Barryroe	Abbeymahon	Clonakilty
Aghamilla	338	Ibane and Barryroe	Kilgarriff	Clonakilty
Aghmanister & Spital	153	Ibane and Barryroe	Abbeymahon	Clonakilty
Ahagilla	110	Ibane and Barryroe	Ardfield	Clonakilty
Ahagilla	316	Ibane and Barryroe	Castleventry	Clonakilty
Ahaglaslin	169	Ibane and Barryroe	Castleventry	Clonakilty
Ahidelake	91	Ibane and Barryroe	Island	Clonakilty
Ardcoohig	109	Ibane and Barryroe	Lislee	Clonakilty
Ardgehane	448	Ibane and Barryroe	Abbeymahon	Clonakilty
Ardmore	223	Ibane and Barryroe	Timoleague	Clonakilty
**Arundelmills**	Town	Ibane and Barryroe	Desert	Clonakilty
**Arundelmills**	Town	Ibane and Barryroe	Templeomalus	Clonakilty
Arundelmills	8	Ibane and Barryroe	Templeomalus	Clonakilty
Ashgrove	174	Ibane and Barryroe	Desert	Clonakilty
Ballincollop	95	Ibane and Barryroe	Lislee	Clonakilty
Ballincourcey	194	Ibane and Barryroe	Templequinlan	Clonakilty
Ballincurrig	128	Ibane and Barryroe	Lislee	Clonakilty
Ballinglanna	121	Ibane and Barryroe	Templequinlan	Clonakilty
Ballinluig	183	Ibane and Barryroe	Lislee	Clonakilty
Ballintemple	268	Ibane and Barryroe	Templeomalus	Clonakilty
Ballinvrokig	246	Ibane and Barryroe	Lislee	Clonakilty
Ballycardeen	62	Ibane and Barryroe	Lislee	Clonakilty
Ballycullenane	54	Ibane and Barryroe	Lislee	Clonakilty
Ballyduvane	225	Ibane and Barryroe	Kilkerranmore	Clonakilty
Ballyduvane	264	Ibane and Barryroe	Kilgarriff	Clonakilty
Ballyhigeen	57	Ibane and Barryroe	Lislee	Clonakilty
Ballyhutch	55	Ibane and Barryroe	Lislee	Clonakilty
Ballylangy	192	Ibane and Barryroe	Lislee	Clonakilty
Ballylibert	109	Ibane and Barryroe	Rathbarry	Clonakilty
Ballyluck	177	Ibane and Barryroe	Island	Clonakilty
Ballymacraheen	113	Ibane and Barryroe	Lislee	Clonakilty
Ballymacredmond	500	Ibane and Barryroe	Lislee	Clonakilty
Ballymacshoneen	233	Ibane and Barryroe	Lislee	Clonakilty
Ballymacwilliam East	104	Ibane and Barryroe	Templeomalus	Clonakilty
Ballymacwilliam South	18	Ibane and Barryroe	Templeomalus	Clonakilty
Ballymacwilliam West	71	Ibane and Barryroe	Templeomalus	Clonakilty
Ballynamona	235	Ibane and Barryroe	Lislee	Clonakilty
Ballyva	210	Ibane and Barryroe	Ardfield	Clonakilty
Ballyvackey	293	Ibane and Barryroe	Kilkerranmore	Clonakilty
Balteenbrack	33	Ibane and Barryroe	Island	Clonakilty
Balteenbrack	58	Ibane and Barryroe	Ardfield	Clonakilty
Barreragh	110	Ibane and Barryroe	Lislee	Clonakilty
Barryshall	579	Ibane and Barryroe	Timoleague	Clonakilty
Bealad East	445	Ibane and Barryroe	Kilkerranmore	Clonakilty
Bealad West	573	Ibane and Barryroe	Kilkerranmore	Clonakilty
Bohona	229	Ibane and Barryroe	Castleventry	Clonakilty
Brittas	11	Ibane and Barryroe	Ardfield	Clonakilty
Brittas	2	Ibane and Barryroe	Island	Clonakilty
Brittas	26	Ibane and Barryroe	Kilkerranmore	Clonakilty
Brittas North	62	Ibane and Barryroe	Island	Clonakilty
Brittas South	55	Ibane and Barryroe	Island	Clonakilty
Brownstown	246	Ibane and Barryroe	Ardfield	Clonakilty
**Butlerstown**	Town	Ibane and Barryroe	Lislee	Clonakilty
Butlerstown	372	Ibane and Barryroe	Lislee	Clonakilty
Caher	135	Ibane and Barryroe	Ardfield	Clonakilty
Cahergal	27	Ibane and Barryroe	Desert	Clonakilty
Cahergal	61	Ibane and Barryroe	Templeomalus	Clonakilty
Caherlarhig	197	Ibane and Barryroe	Island	Clonakilty
Camus	320	Ibane and Barryroe	Rathbarry	Clonakilty
Camus	367	Ibane and Barryroe	Kilkerranmore	Clonakilty
Carhoo	269	Ibane and Barryroe	Kilgarriff	Clonakilty
Carhoo	32	Ibane and Barryroe	Ardfield	Clonakilty
Carhoo	534	Ibane and Barryroe	Timoleague	Clonakilty
Carrigeen	247	Ibane and Barryroe	Lislee	Clonakilty
Carrigfadeen	138	Ibane and Barryroe	Rathbarry	Clonakilty
Carrigroe	559	Ibane and Barryroe	Rathbarry	Clonakilty
Castle Lower	79	Ibane and Barryroe	Timoleague	Clonakilty
Castle Upper	103	Ibane and Barryroe	Timoleague	Clonakilty
Castlefreke	324	Ibane and Barryroe	Rathbarry	Clonakilty
Castlefreke-island	245	Ibane and Barryroe	Rathbarry	Clonakilty
Castlefreke-warren	178	Ibane and Barryroe	Rathbarry	Clonakilty
Clasharaggy	43	Ibane and Barryroe	Kilkerranmore	Clonakilty
Clasharusheen	159	Ibane and Barryroe	Castleventry	Clonakilty
Cloghgriffin	286	Ibane and Barryroe	Templequinlan	Clonakilty
Clonlea	133	Ibane and Barryroe	Kilkerranmore	Clonakilty
Clooncunnig	116	Ibane and Barryroe	Ardfield	Clonakilty
Cooligboy	89	Ibane and Barryroe	Timoleague	Clonakilty
Coorleigh North	154	Ibane and Barryroe	Kilkerranmore	Clonakilty
Coorleigh South	131	Ibane and Barryroe	Kilkerranmore	Clonakilty
Corrabally	121	Ibane and Barryroe	Kilkerranmore	Clonakilty
Corrabally	130	Ibane and Barryroe	Ardfield	Clonakilty
Couneambeg	127	Ibane and Barryroe	Templeomalus	Clonakilty
**Courtmacsherry**	Town	Ibane and Barryroe	Lislee	Clonakilty
Courtmacsherry	215	Ibane and Barryroe	Lislee	Clonakilty
Creagh Beg	230	Ibane and Barryroe	Kilkerranmore	Clonakilty
Creagh More	257	Ibane and Barryroe	Kilkerranmore	Clonakilty
Creboy	28	Ibane and Barryroe	Ardfield	Clonakilty
Creboy	50	Ibane and Barryroe	Island	Clonakilty
Creggane	310	Ibane and Barryroe	Abbeymahon	Clonakilty
Cruary East	188	Ibane and Barryroe	Templeomalus	Clonakilty
Cruary West	153	Ibane and Barryroe	Templeomalus	Clonakilty
Cullenagh	363	Ibane and Barryroe	Lislee	Clonakilty
Curragh	313	Ibane and Barryroe	Kilkerranmore	Clonakilty
Curraghgrane Beg	72	Ibane and Barryroe	Desert	Clonakilty
Curraheen	236	Ibane and Barryroe	Lislee	Clonakilty
Currahevern East	233	Ibane and Barryroe	Abbeymahon	Clonakilty
Currahevern West	164	Ibane and Barryroe	Abbeymahon	Clonakilty
Currahy	192	Ibane and Barryroe	Abbeymahon	Clonakilty
Dairies	8	Ibane and Barryroe	Ardfield	Clonakilty
Darrary	356	Ibane and Barryroe	Templeomalus	Clonakilty
Derryduff	427	Ibane and Barryroe	Ross	Clonakilty
Derryvreen	316	Ibane and Barryroe	Kilmeen	Clonakilty
Derryvreen	76	Ibane and Barryroe	Castleventry	Clonakilty
Donaghmore	312	Ibane and Barryroe	Donaghmore	Clonakilty
Donoure	416	Ibane and Barryroe	Rathbarry	Clonakilty
Drombeg	81	Ibane and Barryroe	Island	Clonakilty
Dundeady	354	Ibane and Barryroe	Rathbarry	Clonakilty
Duneen	185	Ibane and Barryroe	Island	Clonakilty
Duneen	22	Ibane and Barryroe	Ardfield	Clonakilty
Dunmore	226	Ibane and Barryroe	Island	Clonakilty
Dunnycove	121	Ibane and Barryroe	Ardfield	Clonakilty
Dunowen	559	Ibane and Barryroe	Ardfield	Clonakilty
Dunowen	56	Ibane and Barryroe	Island	Clonakilty
Dunworly	328	Ibane and Barryroe	Lislee	Clonakilty
Farran	77	Ibane and Barryroe	Templeomalus	Clonakilty
Farran	89	Ibane and Barryroe	Ardfield	Clonakilty
Ganniv Beg	155	Ibane and Barryroe	Rathbarry	Clonakilty
Ganniv More	146	Ibane and Barryroe	Rathbarry	Clonakilty
Garralacka	230	Ibane and Barryroe	Kilkerranmore	Clonakilty
Garranagoleen	266	Ibane and Barryroe	Kilkerranmore	Clonakilty
Garrane	296	Ibane and Barryroe	Abbeymahon	Clonakilty
Garrymore	65	Ibane and Barryroe	Ardfield	Clonakilty
Gearagh	498	Ibane and Barryroe	Kilmeen	Clonakilty
Gortagrenane	129	Ibane and Barryroe	Rathbarry	Clonakilty
Gortnagearagh	77	Ibane and Barryroe	Kilkerranmore	Clonakilty
Gortnascarty	91	Ibane and Barryroe	Kilkerranmore	Clonakilty
Grange Beg	264	Ibane and Barryroe	Abbeymahon	Clonakilty
Grange More	503	Ibane and Barryroe	Abbeymahon	Clonakilty
Greenanes	15	Ibane and Barryroe	Ardfield	Clonakilty
Greenfield	44	Ibane and Barryroe	Kilkerranmore	Clonakilty
Horse Rock Little	1	Ibane and Barryroe	Lislee	Clonakilty
Kilkeran	560	Ibane and Barryroe	Rathbarry	Clonakilty
Kilruane	272	Ibane and Barryroe	Ross	Clonakilty
Kilsillagh	244	Ibane and Barryroe	Kilsillagh	Clonakilty
Knockanemeeleen	97	Ibane and Barryroe	Lislee	Clonakilty
Knockanoran	80	Ibane and Barryroe	Kilkerranmore	Clonakilty
Knockaphonery	156	Ibane and Barryroe	Rathbarry	Clonakilty
Knockatlowig	312	Ibane and Barryroe	Castleventry	Clonakilty
Knocknagappul	102	Ibane and Barryroe	Rathbarry	Clonakilty
Knocknageehy	247	Ibane and Barryroe	Ross	Clonakilty
Knocks	186	Ibane and Barryroe	Kilmeane	Clonakilty
Lackarour	127	Ibane and Barryroe	Lislee	Clonakilty
Lackenduff	251	Ibane and Barryroe	Templeomalus	Clonakilty
Lehenagh	479	Ibane and Barryroe	Abbeymahon	Clonakilty
Lettercollum	209	Ibane and Barryroe	Timoleague	Clonakilty
Lisduff	161	Ibane and Barryroe	Rathbarry	Clonakilty
Lisleecourt	420	Ibane and Barryroe	Lislee	Clonakilty
Lisleetemple	193	Ibane and Barryroe	Lislee	Clonakilty
**Lislevane**	Town	Ibane and Barryroe	Abbeymahon	Clonakilty
Lislevane	600	Ibane and Barryroe	Abbeymahon	Clonakilty
Lissycrimeen	532	Ibane and Barryroe	Lislee	Clonakilty
Little-Island	111	Ibane and Barryroe	Rathbarry	Clonakilty
Little-Island	48	Ibane and Barryroe	Ardfield	Clonakilty
Lonagh	33	Ibane and Barryroe	Island	Clonakilty
Maulatrahane	79	Ibane and Barryroe	Rathbarry	Clonakilty
Maulmacredmond	389	Ibane and Barryroe	Templequinlan	Clonakilty
Maulmore	105	Ibane and Barryroe	Templequinlan	Clonakilty
Maulycorcoran	136	Ibane and Barryroe	Kilkerranmore	Clonakilty
Meelmane	226	Ibane and Barryroe	Lislee	Clonakilty
Milltown	106	Ibane and Barryroe	Rathbarry	Clonakilty
Moneennamucky	101	Ibane and Barryroe	Ardfield	Clonakilty
Mountain Common	324	Ibane and Barryroe	Ardfield	Clonakilty
Muckruss	99	Ibane and Barryroe	Ardfield	Clonakilty
Pallas	105	Ibane and Barryroe	Ardfield	Clonakilty
Pallas	25	Ibane and Barryroe	Island	Clonakilty
Rineen	28	Ibane and Barryroe	Island	Clonakilty
Rocksavage	166	Ibane and Barryroe	Templequinlan	Clonakilty
Shanaghobarravane	173	Ibane and Barryroe	Lislee	Clonakilty
Sleveen	360	Ibane and Barryroe	Kilmeen	Clonakilty
South-ring	246	Ibane and Barryroe	Templeomalus	Clonakilty
Spital & Aghmanister	153	Ibane and Barryroe	Abbeymahon	Clonakilty
**Timoleague**	Town	Ibane and Barryroe	Timoleague	Clonakilty
Timoleague	185	Ibane and Barryroe	Timoleague	Clonakilty
Tirnanean	165	Ibane and Barryroe	Lislee	Clonakilty
Trieneens	81	Ibane and Barryroe	Templequinlan	Clonakilty
Tullyneasky East	305	Ibane and Barryroe	Kilkerranmore	Clonakilty
Tullyneasky West	315	Ibane and Barryroe	Kilkerranmore	Clonakilty
Ummera	159	Ibane and Barryroe	Timoleague	Clonakilty
Woodfield	601	Ibane and Barryroe	Kilkerranmore	Clonakilty
