= Kevin O'Driscoll =

Irish Gaelic footballer

Personal information
- Native name: Caoimhín Ó Drisceoil (Irish)
- Born: 10 November 1989 (age 36) Caheragh, County Cork, Ireland
- Occupation: Accountant
- Height: 6 ft 2 in (188 cm)

Sport
- Sport: Gaelic Football
- Position: Right wing-forward
Clubs
- Years: Club
- Tadhg Mac Carthaigh's; Carbery
Club titles
- Cork titles: 0
College
- Years: College
- University College Cork
College titles
- Sigerson titles: 1
Inter-county
- Years: County
- 2011-2018: Cork
Inter-county titles
- Munster titles: 9
- All-Irelands: 0
- NFL: 9
- All Stars: 0

Kevin O'Driscoll (born 10 November 1989) is an Irish Gaelic footballer who plays for West Cork Junior Championship club Tadhg McCarthaigh's and formerly at inter-county level with the Cork senior football team. He usually lines out as a right wing-forward.

O'Driscoll's brothers, Brian and Colm, as well as his father, Gene, have all played for Cork.

== Honours ==
University College Cork

- Sigerson Cup (1): 2011

Tadhg Mac Carthaigh's

- South West Junior A Football Championship (3): 2006, 2012, 2021

Cork

- National Football League Division 1 (2): 2011, 2012
- National Football League Division 3 (1): 2020
- All-Ireland Under-21 Football Championship (1): 2009
- Munster Under-21 Football Championship (1): 2009
- Munster Minor Football Championship (1): 2007
