= 1942 Cork Junior Football Championship =

Irish hurling competition

- Champions: Combined Services (1st title)
- Runners-up: Clann na nGael

The 1942 Cork Junior Football Championship was the 44th staging of the Cork Junior Football Championship since its establishment by the Cork County Board in 1895.

The final was played on 29 November 1942 at the Mardyke in Cork, between Combined Services and Clann na nGael, in what was their first ever meeting in the final. Combined Services won the match by 3–05 to 0–04 to claim their first ever championship title.

== Results ==
=== Final ===
29 November 1942 Final	Combined Services	3–05 – 0–04	Clann na nGael	The Mardyke
