= Seán Levis =

Irish Gaelic footballer

Personal information
- Native name: Seán Mac Dhoinnléibhe (Irish)
- Born: 1981 (age 44–45) Durrus, County Cork, Ireland
- Occupation: Sales representative
- Height: 6 ft 1 in (185 cm)

Sport
- Sport: Gaelic football
- Position: Right wing-back
Clubs
- Years: Club
- Muintir Bháire → Carbery
Club titles
- Cork titles: 1
Inter-county*
Years	County	Apps (scores)
2002-2007	Cork	12 (0-00)
Inter-county titles
- Munster titles: 2
- All-Irelands: 0
- NFL: 0
- All Stars: 0
- *Inter County team apps and scores correct as of 23:33, 17 April 2020.

Seán Levis (born 1981) is an Irish former Gaelic footballer who played for club side Muintir Bháire, at divisional level with Carbery and at inter-county level with the Cork senior football team. He usually lined out as a defender.

== Career ==
Levis first came to Gaelic football prominence with the Muintir Bháire club in West Cork, with whom he won a County Junior B Championship in 2003. He also secured inclusion on the Carbery divisional team and was a member of the 2004 County Senior Championship-winning team. Levis first played for Cork at minor level. He won an All-Ireland Junior Championship in 2001. Levis subsequently progressed onto the Cork senior team and won two Munster Championship medals and was a substitute when Cork were beaten by Kerry in the 2007 All-Ireland final.

== Honours ==
Muintir Bháire

- Cork Junior B Football Championship: 2003

Carbery

- Cork Senior Football Championship: 2004

Cork

- Munster Senior Football Championship: 2002, 2006
- All-Ireland Junior Football Championship: 2001
- Munster Junior Football Championship: 2001
