= Colm O'Driscoll =

Irish Gaelic footballer

Personal information
- Native name: Colm Ó Drisceoil (Irish)
- Born: 9 June 1988 (age 38) Caheragh, County Cork, Ireland
- Height: 5 ft 8 in (173 cm)

Sport
- Sport: Gaelic football
- Position: Left wing-forward
Club
- Years: Club
- Tadhg Mac Cárthaigh's
Club titles
- Cork titles: 0
Inter-county*
Years	County	Apps (scores)
2014-2019	Cork	2 (1-9)
Inter-county titles
- Munster titles: 0
- All-Irelands: 0
- NHL: 0
- All Stars: 0
- *Inter County team apps and scores correct as of 18:27, 25 July 2014.

Colm O'Driscoll (born 9 June 1988) is an Irish Gaelic footballer who used to play as a left wing-forward for the Cork senior team and currently coaches Ilen Rovers.

Born in Caheragh, County Cork, O'Driscoll first arrived on the inter-county scene at the age of sixteen when he first linked up with the Cork minor team, before later joining the under-21 and junior sides. He made his senior debut during the 2014 championship. Since then O'Driscoll has become a regular member of the starting fifteen.

At club level O'Driscoll plays with Tadhg Mac Cárthaigh's.

O'Driscoll's brothers, Brian and Kevin, as well as his father, Gene, have all played for Cork.

== Honours ==
=== Team ===
Cork

- All-Ireland Junior Football Championship (2): 2009, 2013
- Munster Junior Football Championship (2): 2009, 2013
- All-Ireland Under-21 Football Championship (2): 2007 )sub), 2009
- Munster Under-21 Football Championship (2): 2007 (sub), 2009
- Munster Minor Football Championship (1): 2005
