= Coomkeen =

Coomkeen Irish: Com Caoin
- townland

Irish transcription(s)
- Coomkeen shown within Ireland
- Coordinates: 51°38′25″N 09°31′52″W
- Country: Ireland
- County: County Cork
- Barony: Carbery West (W.D.)
- Civil parish: Durrus

Area
  - Total: 370 ha (914 acres)

Coomkeen (Irish: Com Caoin) is a townland located near Durrus in West Cork, Province of Munster, Ireland. It is a small valley home to approximately 14 families, it is also the home of the world-famous Durrus Cheese.

== History ==
Home to Reverend Timothy Crowley, Parish Priest, Coomkeen Upper, 1776.

Prior to purchase under the Land Acts of the early 1900s, the lands were owned by Lord Bandon and rented by tenant farmers. In the late 1920s a new road to Bantry was built from Coomkeen and was celebrated by local poet Charles Dennis:

Oh! Durrus, you were often fleeced,
In the good old days gone by
And only for Mr. MacManaway
You should lie down and die
He's out to help industry
Give every man fair play,
His enterprising capitalist
Will surely win the day
His latest stunt is to build a road
Through the fair valley of Coomkeen
It starts at Crocawadra
An ends in Gearameen
We'll make of him a Bishop
And that without a doubt,
And he'll remove the Border,
Between North and South.

=== 1901 census ===
1901 Census of Coomkeen.

- Name: Number in each family
- William Dukelow 7
- James Dukelow 7
- Margaret Sullivan 3
- John Burke 3
- Daniel Burke 7
- Daniel Sullivan 6
- Catherine Mahony 3
- John McCarthy 4
- Catherine Burke 4
- John Cronin 4
- Denis Cronin 2
- Mary Hooly 3
- Johanna Moynihan 4
- Daniel Wholihan 5
- Timothy Wholihan 7
- John Wholihan 2
- Cornelius Cronin 3

==== Speakers of Irish and English, 1901 Census ====
John, Mary, 26, Daniel Burke, Daniel, 64, Mary Burke, 60, Daniel, 63, Mary Ann, 50, Sullivan, Catherine Mahony, 68, John 50, Hanorah, 40, Cronin, Mary Wholly, 80, Daniel, 50, Julia, 48, Jeremiah, 14, Wholihan, Timothy Wholihan, 55

=== 1911 Census ===
1911 Census of Coomkeen.

Name: Number in each family

- Husband: John Bourke (note spelling) 4
- Jeremiah Bourke 9
- Cornelius Crimmin (Cronin) 7
- Jeremiah Cronin 10
- John Wholihan 8
- Daniel Wholihan 4
- Timothy Wholihan 4
- Jermiah Moynihan 6
- Hannah Cronin 4
- Denis Bourke 4
- Jeremiah Whalley 5
- Ger McCarthy 7
- Thomas Mahony 2
- Mary Sullivan 3
- James Dukelow 5
- William Dukelow 4
- Cornelius Scully 2

== Present population ==
By 2006 most of the original families who lived in the 19th and early 20th centuries were no longer resident. Around 10 of the current dwellings are pre-famine, according to the early OS maps. This townland has had most of its field names preserved by the Cork and Kerry Place Names Survey in 2008.

There is a burial ground; mass rock site and on the Crottees boundary, a stone circle overlooking Durrus village. There was reputedly some mining exploration carried out on the south side of Knockboolteeangh in the 1840s and ore was extracted but not dressed.
