= Ibane and Barryroe =

Barony in County Cork, Ireland

Ibane and Barryroe Uí Bhána agus Barraigh Rua (Irish)
- Barony
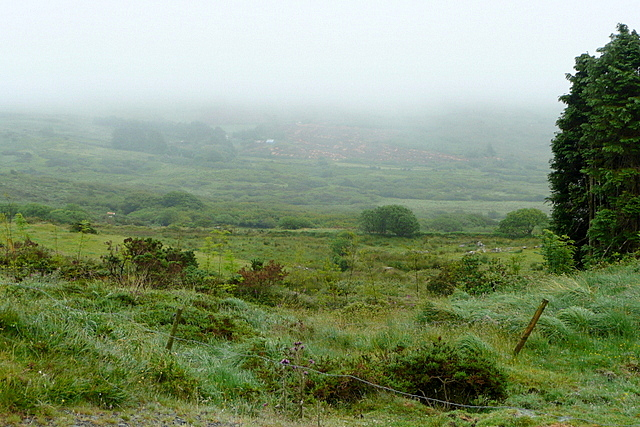

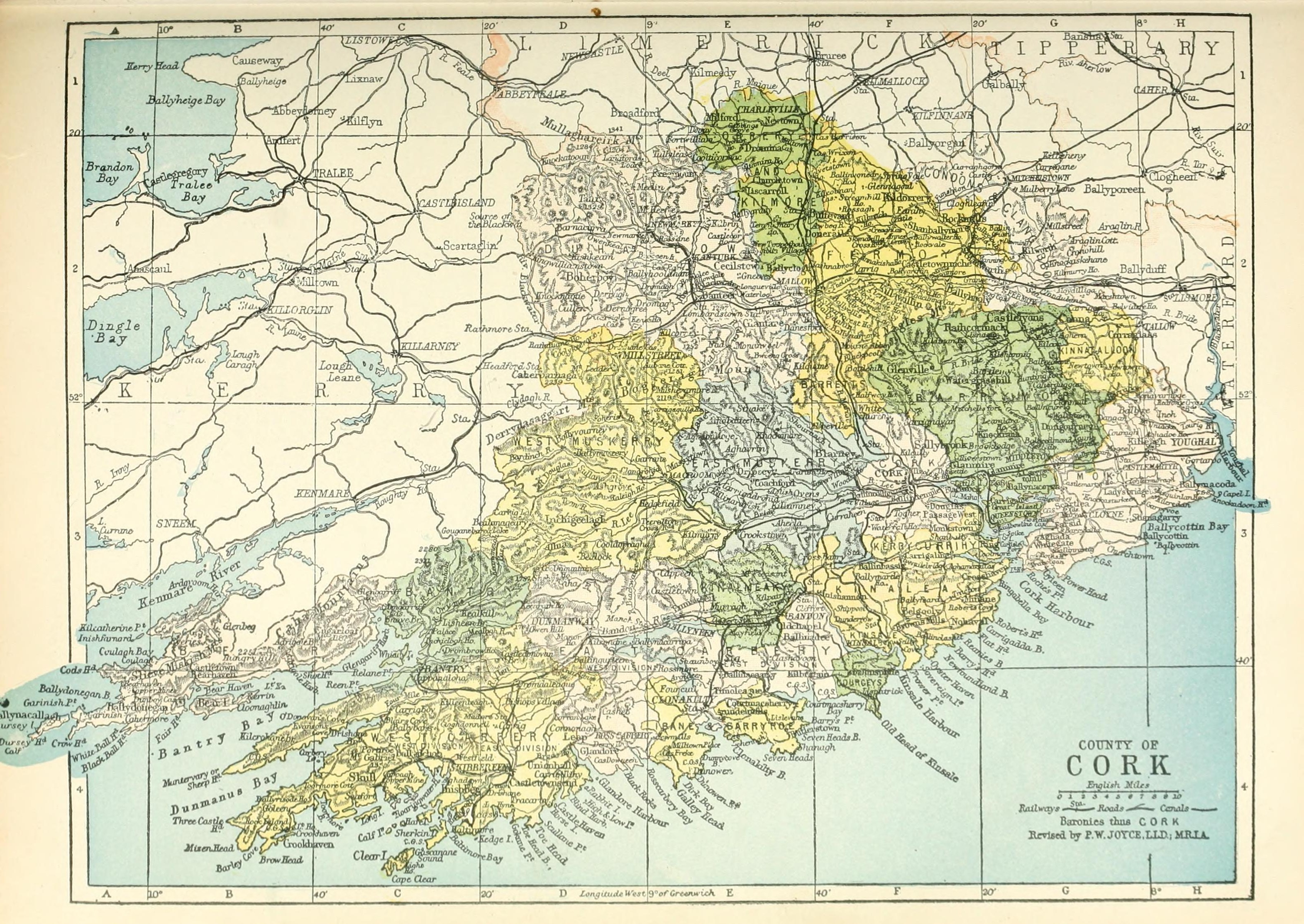
- Barony map of County Cork, 1900; Ibane and Barryroe barony is in the middle of the south coast, coloured yellow.

- Location within County Cork
- Coordinates: 51°35′26″N 8°51′59″W
- Sovereign state: Ireland
- Province: Munster
- County: Cork

Area
  - Total: 142.8 km^{2} (55.1 sq mi)

Ibane and Barryroe (Irish: Uí Bhána agus Barraigh Rua; archaic spellings Ibaune, Ibawn, O'Bathumpna, Barriro, Barriroe) is a historical barony in southern County Cork, Ireland.

Baronies were mainly cadastral rather than administrative units. They acquired modest local taxation and spending functions in the 19th century before being superseded by the Local Government (Ireland) Act 1898.

== History and etymology ==
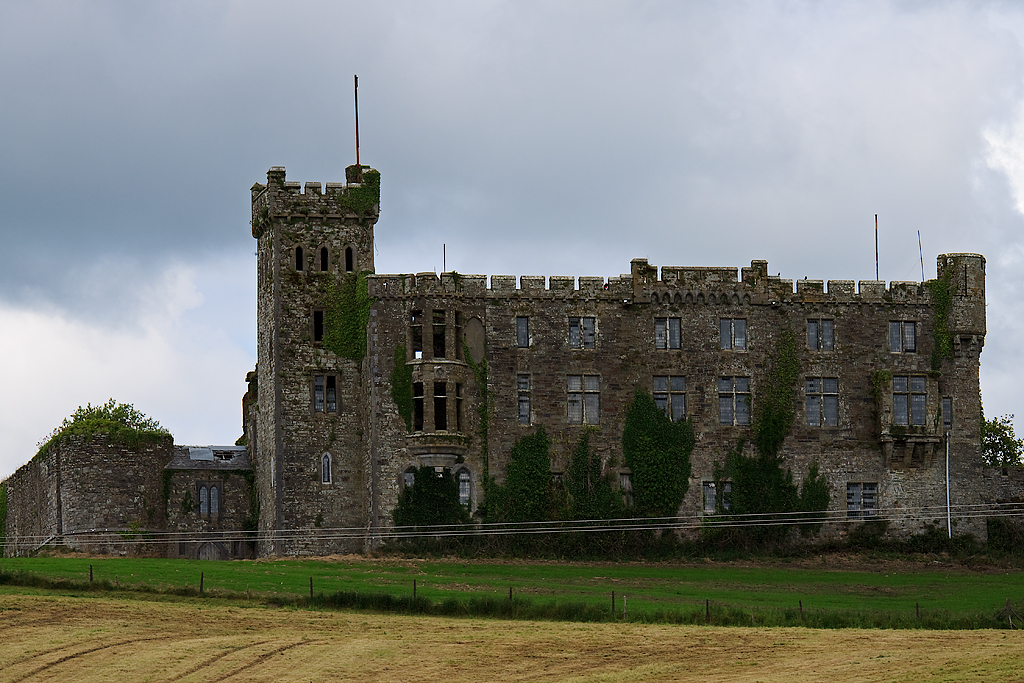
Kilbrittain Castle

The Ó Floinn were the ancient chiefs of the territory of Uí Baghamna (Uí Badamna). Parts of the region were part of the ancient land of Corcu Loígde. Abbeymahon Abbey was also called the monastery of Uí Badamna.

The Ó Cobhthaigh clan had seven castles on the coast and were lords of a region called Triocha Meona. The Ó Cuileannáin family also had land in Ibane, while the O'Fehilly of Tuatha O Fitcheallaigh were rulers of west Barryroe and the Ardfield parish.

Barryroe is named for the Barry Roe ("Red Barrys") sept of the Anglo-Norman De Barry family. The name "Ibane and Barryroe" is misleading as it implies two separate regions, when it is actually a single area, before the Norman invasion "Ibane" and after that "Barryroe."

The 1340 Book of Ballymote mentions that the Corco Laige Cuil are descended from Mac Niad, son of Lugdach; the descendants of his son Eocho became the Hui Badamna (Ibane).

It was a holdout of the Irish language; the 1871 census showed Ibane and Barryroe with 59% Irish speakers, the highest rate in County Cork.

== Geography ==
Ibane and Barryroe is located in the south of County Cork, comprising two chunks of coastal land either side of Clonakilty..

== List of settlements ==
Settlements within the historical barony of Ibane and Barryroe include:

- Castlefreke
- Courtmacsherry
- Timoleague
- Kilmeen
- Rossmore

== See also ==
- List of townlands of the barony of Ibane and Barryroe
