= Brian O'Driscoll (Gaelic footballer) =

Irish Gaelic footballer

Personal information
- Native name: Brían Ó Drisceoil (Irish)
- Born: 10 April 1994 (age 32) Cork, Ireland
- Occupation: Student
- Height: 1.83 m (6 ft 0 in)

Sport
- Sport: Gaelic Football
- Position: Right half back, Wing Forward
Club
- Years: Club
- 2011-2024 Carrigaline 2024 -: Tadhg Mac Cárthaigh's
College
- Years: College
- UCC
College titles
- Sigerson titles: 1
Inter-county
- Years: County
- 2014-: Cork

Brian O'Driscoll (born 10 April 1994) is an Irish Gaelic footballer who plays as a right wing-back for the Cork senior team.

Born in Caheragh, County Cork, O'Driscoll first arrived on the inter-county scene at the age of sixteen when he first linked up with the Cork minor team, before later joining the under-21 side. He made his senior debut during the 2014 National Football League. Since then O'Driscoll has become a regular member of the starting fifteen.

At club level O'Driscoll plays with Tadhg Mac Cárthaigh's.

O'Driscoll's brothers, Colm and Kevin, as well as his father, Gene, have all played for Cork.

== Honours ==
=== Team ===
University College Cork :

- Sigerson Cup (1): 2014

Cork :

- Munster Under-21 Football Championship (3): 2012, 2013, 2014

•Tadhg McCarthaigh :

West Cork Junior-A Championship: (2) 2012, 2021
