= St James' Church, Durrus =

Anglican church in County Cork, Ireland

Church of St James the Apostle
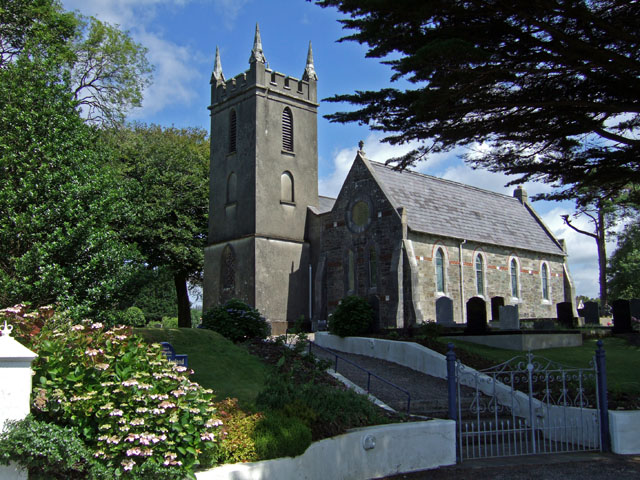
- Tower and nave of St James'
- Church of St James the Apostle
- Country: Ireland
- Denomination: Church of Ireland

History
- Founded: 1792
- Dedication: James the Great

Architecture
- Style: Venetian Gothic Revival

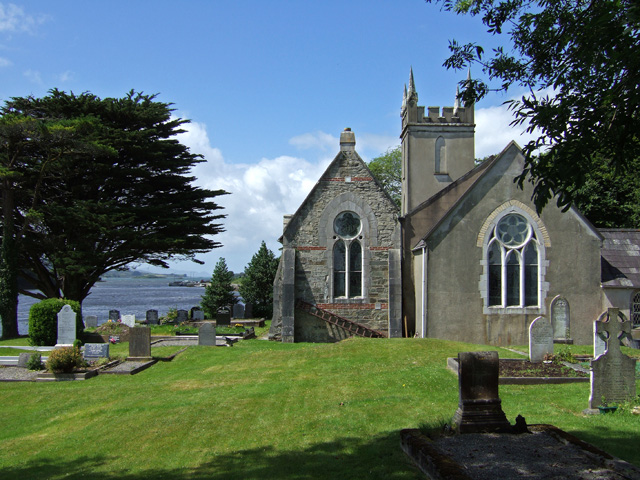
St James' church is set in a graveyard, surrounded by a rubble wall.

The Church of St James the Apostle, commonly referred to as St James' Church, is a small Gothic Revival Anglican church located in Durrus, County Cork, Ireland. It was completed in 1792. It is dedicated to James the Great. It is part of the Kilmocomogue Union Of Parishes, in the Diocese of Cork, Cloyne, and Ross.

== History ==
Located on the site of an earlier church dating to at least 1615, St James' Church was founded in 1792, and was funded with a loan from the Board of First Fruits. The church soon collapsed as it was poorly built. In 1799 the church was rebuilt at the expense of the rector, Rev Henry Jones, though it is not recorded how much it cost him. The building was enlarged and remodelled between 1831 and 1832, when the tower was built. These renovations were possibly to plans made by Cork architect Henry Hill. In the mid 19th century, the Countess of Bandon funded the construction of a chancel. William Atkins designed a robing room and a new south aisle for the church which were completed in 1867.

On 27 April 1925, an organ was built and dedicated in St James'. Prior to this, there had been a harmonium in the church. In October 1929, the southern wall of the church was repaired, consisting of drying and plastering it. In 1932, the church went under extensive repairs. In 1940, a vestry was constructed. In 1949, gas lighting was installed in the church, which was then replaces in the 1960s by electric lighting. Further renovations began in 1989. The Durrus Garden Fête is a long-standing annual tradition, dating to at least 1932. It has been held every year since, with the exception of 2020 and 2021 due social distancing guidelines imposed by the Irish Government during the COVID-19 pandemic.

The Parish of Durrus was united with the Parish of Kilmocomogue in 1984, forming the Kilmocomogue Union of Parishes. The parishes had previously been united in 1669 as the church in Durrus had been ruined. The ruining of the original church took place sometime after 1639. Upon the construction of St James' in 1792, they were again separated.

As of 2021, Rev Canon Paul Willoughby was serving as rector of the parish.

== Architecture ==
The church is built in Venetian Gothic style. The church has several notable stained glass windows. The original three-bay nave of the church is complemented by the 1867 additional four-bay nave.
