= Pat Hegarty (Gaelic footballer) =

Irish Gaelic footballer

Personal information
- Native name: Pádraig Ó hÉigeartaigh (Irish)
- Born: 1973 (age 52–53) Caheragh, County Cork, Ireland
- Occupation: Garda Síochána
- Height: 6 ft 3 in (191 cm)

Sport
- Sport: Gaelic football
- Position: Midfield
Club
- Years: Club
- Tadhg Mac Cárthaigh's
Club titles
- Cork titles: 1
Inter-county*
Years	County	Apps (scores)
1993-1998	Cork	3 (0-00)
Inter-county titles
- Munster titles: 3
- All-Irelands: 0
- NHL: 0
- All Stars: 0
- *Inter County team apps and scores correct as of 11:53, 28 June 2017.

Pat Hegarty (born 1973) is an Irish retired Gaelic footballer. His league and championship career with the Cork senior team lasted from 1993 until 1998.

Hegarty made his debut on the inter-county scene at the age of sixteen when he was selected for the Cork minor team. He enjoyed two championship seasons with the minor team, culminating with the winning of an All-Ireland medal in 1991. Hegarty subsequently joined the Cork under-21, winning an All-Ireland medal in 1994. By this stage he had joined the Cork senior team after being added to the panel during the 1991 championship. An All-Ireland runner-up in 1993, Hegarty won three Munster medals.

== Honours ==
Cork

- Munster Senior Football Championship (3): 1993, 1994, 1995
- Munster Junior Football Championship (1): 1992
- All-Ireland Under-21 Football Championship (1): 1994
- Munster Under-21 Football Championship (1): 1994
- All-Ireland Minor Football Championship (1): 1991
- Munster Minor Football Championship (1): 1991
