= Church Education Society =

Church of Ireland body

The Church Education Society was a Church of Ireland body set up in 1839 to promote Anglican Church primary schools in Ireland.

== History ==
The Society was set up in 1839 to counter the setting up of the National Schools system by the Whig government. At a meeting in the Rotunda on 10 January 1832, Robert Daly, who later became Bishop of Cashel and Waterford, advocated the setting up of a Church Education Society. After some independent local initiatives by Church of Ireland groups, the society was established officially in 1839.

Despite initial successes, the society suffered splits, and most Anglicans by the middle of the 19th century embraced the education reforms.

Today the Society supports Church of Ireland children in national schools under sole or joint Church of Ireland patronage.
