= Coolcoulaghta Standing Stones =

Coolcoulaghta Standing Stone
- Galláin Chuar Chuallachta (Irish)
- Location within Ireland
- 51.596667°N 9.543333°W
- Type: Standing stones (stone row)
- Location: Coolcoulaghta, Durrus, County Cork, Ireland

History
- Built: 2200–600 BC

Site notes
- Elevation: 109 m (358 ft)
- Height: 1.8 m (5 ft 11 in)
- Owner: Office of Public Works

National monument of Ireland
- Official name: Coolcoulaghta
- Reference no.: 565

The Coolcoulaghta Standing Stones are a pair of standing stones forming a stone row and a National Monument located in County Cork, Ireland.

== Location ==
Coolcoulaghta Standing Stones stand in a field 3.2 km (2.0 mi) southwest of Durrus.

== History ==
The stones probably date to the Bronze Age period. It points towards Dunbeacon stone circle 400 m (¼ mile) to the west and the stones may have been used for astronomical observation.

They were removed in 1980 but the stones were replaced in 1983 by the Office of Public Works, after local outcry, using a plan and elevation made in 1977 by archaeologists of Ordnance Survey Ireland.

The purpose of standing stones is unclear; they may have served as boundary markers, ritual or ceremonial sites, burial sites or astrological alignments.

== Description ==
The stones are both about 1.8 m (6 ft) tall.

A third stone once stood 63 m (70 yd) SSW of the pair; this has since been removed.
