= Muintir Bháire GAA =

GAA club in County Cork

- Founded: 1959
- County: Cork
- Colours: Maroon and White
- Coordinates: 51°37′09.02″N 9°31′33.63″W

Playing kits
Standard colours

Muintir Bháire GAA is a Gaelic Athletic Association club based in Durrus, County Cork, Ireland. The club fields teams in Gaelic football only. The club take part in competitions organized by Carbery division of Cork.

== History ==
There are references to a club in Durrus in 1888 playing Skibbereen. However, there was a near total failure of the potato crop in 1890 and a mood of panic gripped the area, resulting in a drop in the number of clubs from 38 to 2. In the 1930s, the playing field was in Clashadoo opposite the former schoolhouse. The only record of any trophies won was a West Cork Junior 2 title in 1932. In the 1960s, the parish were represented by a side called Western Stars, but that too collapsed due to emigration.

In the 1970s, a new club was formed, and it was agreed to call Muintir Bhaire. During the 1980s, this club reached a West Cork Junior Final, but were runners up on the occasion. Emigration was again to play a part in the near demise of the club during the 1980s and early 1990s. This was overcome following the capture of West Cork titles in U21 (C) in 1996 and U21 (B) in 1998.

The turn of the 21st century saw the West Cork Junior (B) cup won by a club from the parish for the first time in 60 years. This was followed, in 2003, by a first ever Cork Junior B Football Championship title. Club men Sean Levis and Frank Arundel (Junior) won a Cork Senior Championship in 2004 with Divisional side, Carbery. The club were promoted to Junior 1 in 2004 and contested the West Cork final in 2007 where they were defeated by Bandon. They won the West Cork Junior League in 2009, defeating Kilmacabea in the final.

The club were without a ground of their own until 2007. when land was purchased and plans were proposed to develop additional facilities. As of 2019, work was "nearing completion" on new facilities.Completion of the club house and gym were completed in early 2025.

== Achievements ==
- Cork Junior B Football Championship (1): 2003
- West Cork Junior A Football Championship (0): (runners-up in 2007)
- West Cork Junior B Football Championship (3): 1947 (as Durrus), 2000, 2003
- West Cork Junior C Football Championship (1): 1998
- West Cork Junior D Football Championship (1): 2018
- West Cork Minor C Football Championship (1): 2003, 2026
- West Cork Under-21 C Football Championship (2): 1996, 2012
- West Cork Under-21 B Football Championship (1): 1997
