= Kilmeen GAA =

GAA club in County Cork

Kilmeen
- Cil Mhín
- Founded: 1888
- County: Cork
- Nickname: The Super Blues
- Colours
- Grounds: Rossmore Grounds
- Coordinates: 51°40′16.25″N 8°59′41.52″W

Playing kits
Standard colours

Kilmeen GAA is a Gaelic Athletic Association club located in Rossmore, County Cork, Ireland. The club is affiliated to the Carbery Board and the Cork County Board and is solely concerned with Gaelic football. Club members play hurling with sister club Kilbree.

== History ==
Located in the village of Rossmore, about halfway between Clonakilty and Dunmanway, Kilmeen GAA Club was founded on 28 February 1888 and has spent its entire existence operating in the junior grades. The club had its first notable success in 1943, with the winning of the first of eight South West JBFC titles. Kilmeen won the inaugural Cork JBFC title in 1984, following a 0–12 to 0–07 win over Awbeg Rangers. Three years later, Kilmeen made their sole appearance in the South West JAFC final, losing out to Carbery Rangers by 0–14 to 0–05. The club won a second Cork JBFC title in 2015, after a 5–14 to 0–05 win over Grange in the final.

== Honours ==
- Cork Junior B Football Championship (2): 1984, 2015
- Cork Minor C Football Championship (2): 1994, 2011, 2023
- South West Junior B Football Championship (8): 1943, 1952, 1962, 1965, 1984, 2010, 2013, 2014, 2022
- South West Junior D Football Championship (1): 2016
- South West Minor C Football Championship (3): 1994, 2007, 2011
- South West Under-21 A Football Championship (1): 1985
- South West Under-21 B Football Championship (3): 1983, 1984, 2015
- South West Cork Under-21 C Football Championship (2): 1994, 2004
