= Kilmeen and Rossmore =

Villages in County Cork, Ireland

Kilmeen (Irish: Cill Mhín) and Rossmore (Irish: An Ros Mór) are villages in the historic barony of Ibane and Barryroe, County Cork, Ireland, on the L4631 road, situated approximately 10km north of Clonakilty. Kilmeen GAA are based in Kilmeen. Rossmore Theatre is situated in the centre of Rossmore. Kilmeen Drama Group, based in the hall, won the overall prize at All-Ireland Drama Festival in 2011, 2012 and 2013.
