= Clann na nGael GAA (Cork) =

GAA club in County Cork

Clann Na nGael
- Founded: 1888
- County: Cork
- Nickname: The Scorchers
- Colours: Green, White and Black
- Grounds: Páirc Tadhg na Samhna

Playing kits
Standard colours

Clann na nGael GAA club is a Gaelic football club located in the parish of Drimoleague and Drinagh in County Cork, Ireland. It draws its players from the villages of Drimoleague and Drinagh, and the surrounding areas. The club participates in the Carbery (West Cork) division of Cork and operates at Junior A, B and C level in football. It caters for boys and girls from under-eight up to adult level.

== History ==
=== Origins and first match ===
Clann na nGael GAA Club was founded in 1888. The first sign that a committee was in operation comes in February 1888. A letter appeared in the "Skibbereen Eagle" protesting at that newspaper's report of a match between the O'Connell's club (a Drimoleague-Drinagh combination) and the Geraldine Club (Leap). The letter was signed John J. McCarthy, Hon. Secretary with John Beamish stepping into the vacant position.

The first match played by a team representing the entire Drimoleague–Drinagh parish took place in Drinagh between Drimoleague-Drinagh (O'Connells) and Leap (Geraldines) in Drinagh. The ball was thrown in at 3 o'clock after O'Connells won the toss. Reflecting a practice at the time, where clubs adopted patriotic names to show their nationalistic beliefs, the team was known as "O'Connells" in honour of Daniel O'Connell. In its early days, the club played in Walties Field.

=== 20th century ===
In 1902, the team was captained by Jack O'Mahony. He was locally known as 'the Scorcher' owing to his hard, low, rasping shot. 'The Scorcher' was a member of a family that lived in Main Street West at the start of the 20th century. He served in the first World War, being seriously injured in Flanders. The club later became known as "the Scorchers".

During the 1940s, the club won three West Cork titles in a row: 1941, 1942 and 1943. In 1942, they reached the county final, but lost to a strong combined services team.

While the 1950s and 1960s were lean years for the club, they reached the West Cork final again in 1958. Efforts were made to revive the fortunes of the club in the 1970s, with emphasis placed on under-age teams. This resulted in the club winning several under-age titles and a West Cork Junior B title in 1977.

After the 1977 West Cork title win, the club regained its Junior A status and had a number of successes throughout the 1980s. Clann na nGael won the 'Little Norah' in 1981 and reached the finals in 1984 and 1988. The first county title was brought to the club, by the U16 team, in 1985.

=== 21st century ===
Clann na nGael's Junior team won the club's first adult county and Munster title in 2006, defeating Churchtown and Knockaderry respectively. In 2010, the club qualified for both the Junior A & B West Cork championship finals. In 2012, the Junior As reached the semi-finals of the league while the Junior B & D's competed in their respective league finals.

== Name ==
The club has historically been known by a few titles: The O'Connells, Rock Rovers, Sean Hurleys and St. Finbarrs (Hurling). The club is now known locally as 'The Scorchers'.

== Honours ==
=== Munster Championship ===
- Munster Junior B Club Football Championship (1): 2006

=== Cork County ===
- Cork Junior Football Championship (0): (Runners-up in 1942)
- Cork Junior B Football Championship (2): 2006, 2026

=== West Cork Championship ===
- West Cork Junior A Football Championship (4): 1941, 1942, 1943, 1981
- West Cork Junior B Football Championship (3): 1950, 1977, 2006
- West Cork Junior B Hurling Championship (0): (Runners-Up 1943, 1945)
- West Cork Junior C/D Football Championship (1): 2023
- West Cork Under-21 B Football Championship (2): 1977, 1980
- West Cork Minor B Football Championship (6): 1963, 1974, 1976, 1985, 2008, 2011
- West Cork Minor C Football Championship (1): 2001

=== Ladies Football ===
- Cork Minor C (0): (Runners-up 2009)
- West Cork Minor C (1): 2009
