= Tadhg McCarthaigh's GAA =

Gaelic games club in County Cork, Ireland

- CLG Tadhg McCarthaigh
- Founded: 1954
- County: Cork
- Colours: Yellow and Red

Playing kits
Standard colours

Tadhg MacCarthaigh GAA is a Gaelic Athletic Association club based in Caheragh in County Cork, Ireland. It is a Gaelic football only club, with no hurling played. The club in 2008 decided to start an under-12 hurling team, so the club may become a dual club in the future. The club is a member of the Carbery division of Cork GAA.

== History ==
The Tadhg MacCarthaigh GAA Club was founded in 1954. The first playing fields were in Sonny O’Driscoll’s and Dick Kingston’s of Corliss. The club won its first West Cork Junior B Championship in 1958. Since then, their successes included Junior 2 titles in 1968 and 1975 beating Ardfield on both occasions and in 1991 when they beat Kilbrittain. The club has had successes twice in the Under 21 B Championship, beating Timoleague in 1982 and St. Colum's in 1990.

== Achievements ==
- Cork Junior Football Championship Runner-Up 1995
- Cork Minor A Football Championship Winner (1) 1997
- Cork Minor B Football Championship Winner (1) 1991 Runner-Up 2001
- West Cork Junior A Football Championship Winners (7) 1995, 1997, 2002, 2004, 2006, 2012, 2021 Runners-Up 1977, 1998, 2008, 2013
- West Cork Junior A Football League Winners (1) 1993
- West Cork Junior B Football Championship Winners (4) 1957, 1968, 1975, 1991 Runners-Up 1971, 1989, 1990
- West Cork Junior C Football Championship Winners (1) 2005 Runners-Up 2004, 2006, 2009, 2010
- West Cork Junior D Football Championship Winners (1) 2006
- West Cork Minor A Football Championship Winners (2) 1993, 1997 (as Caheragh) Runners-Up 1996, 2006
- West Cork Minor B Football Championship Winners (1) 1991 (as Caheragh), 2001 Runners-Up 1990, 2002, 2005
- West Cork Under-21 A Football Championship Runners-Up 1995, 1998
- West Cork Under-21 B Football Championship Winners (2) 1982, 1990 Runners-Up 1989, 2007, 2010, 2012, 2024

== Notable players ==
- Pat Hegarty
- Brian O'Driscoll
- Colm O'Driscoll
