= Durrus =

Village in County Cork, Ireland

Durrus Dúras
- Village
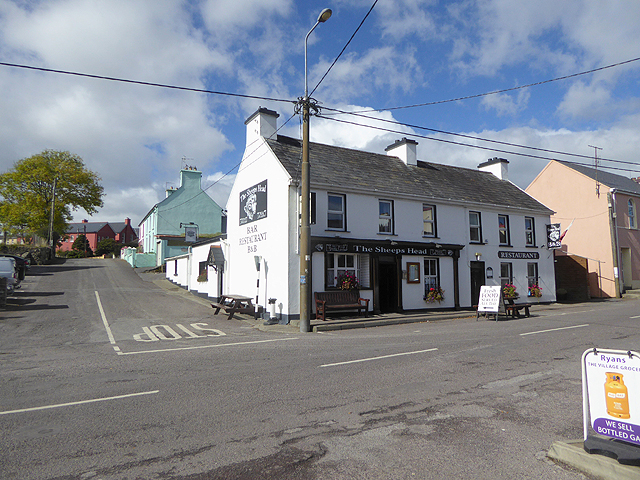
- The Sheeps Head Bar, Durrus

- Location in Ireland
- Coordinates: 51°37′12″N 9°31′34″W
- Country: Ireland
- Province: Munster
- County: County Cork

Population (2022)
  - Total: 381
- Time zone: UTC+0 (WET)
  - Summer (DST): UTC-1 (IST (WEST))
- Irish Grid Reference: V943420

Durrus (Irish: Dúras) is a village and civil parish in West Cork in Ireland. It is situated ten kilometres (6 mi) from Bantry in County Cork, at the head of the Sheep's Head and the Mizen Head peninsulas.

Durrus is on the Wild Atlantic Way driving route which spans the Irish coastline from the Inishowen peninsula in Donegal to Kinsale in County Cork. A number of public gardens have been established in the area, including 'Kilravock' and 'Cois Abhann'.

== Name ==
Durrus was known in mid-19th century as both Four Mile Water (after the nearby river) and Carrigboi (from Carraig Bhuí, the Irish for Yellow Rock). John Rocque's 1790 Map of the Kingdom of Ireland depicts the Four Mile Water and shows 'Coolnalang' [sic]. The name 'Durrous' appears on this map to the north of river. Daniel Augustus Beaufort's 1797 map of Ireland also shows the Four Mile Water with 'Durrus' depicted to the North.

There are a number of variations and derivations given in the Irish language for the village's name, including Dubh Ros (black or dark headland) and Dúras (as used on local road signs).

== History ==
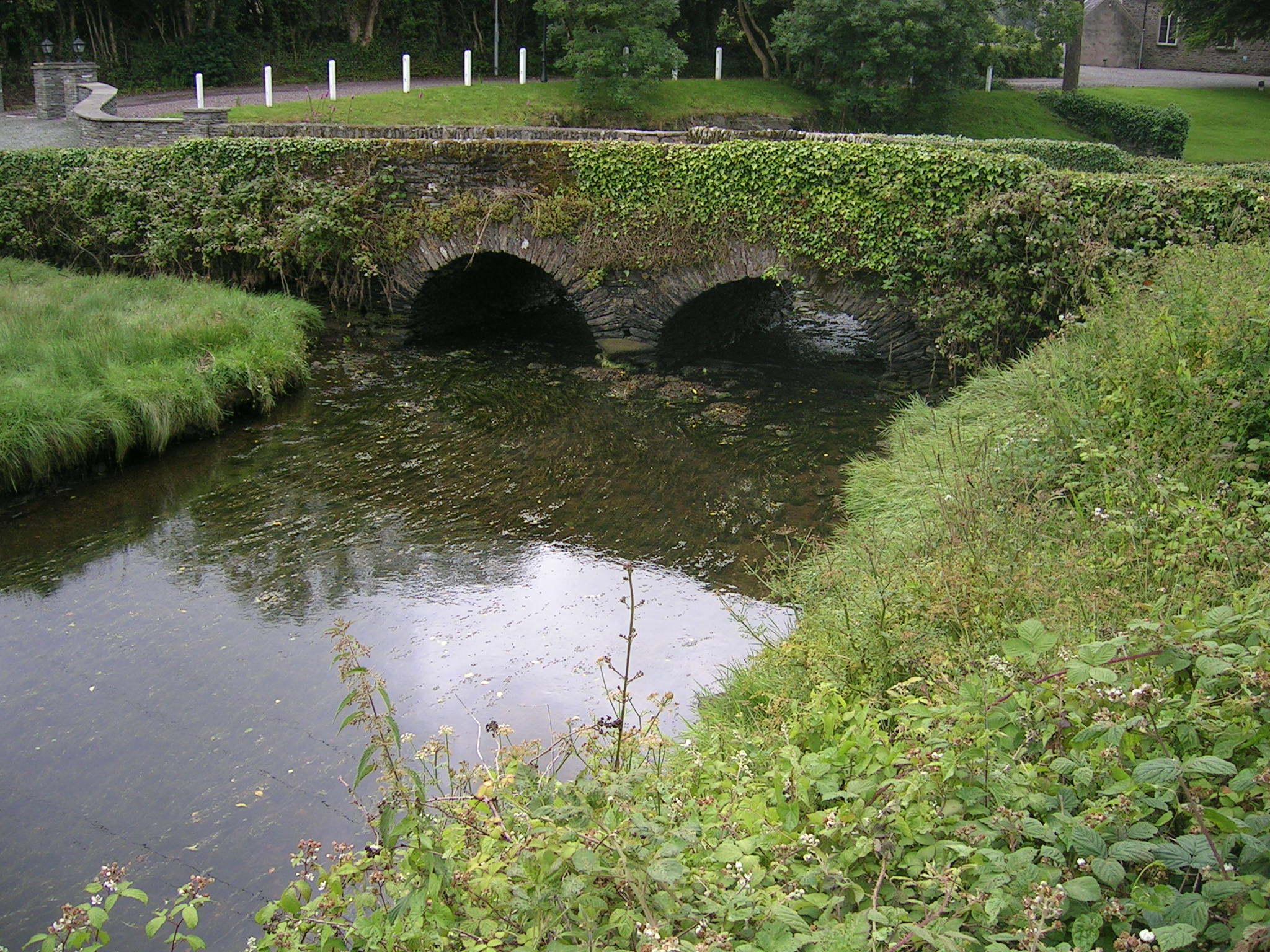
Bridge in Durrus

=== Prehistory ===
Evidence of prehistoric settlement in the area include a stone row at Moulinward and a stone circle at Dunbeacon (both dated to the Bronze Age c. 2200 BC – 600 BC). There are also standing stones (gallauns) at Ballycomane, Kealties, and Parkana. The Coolcoulaghta Standing Stones stand in a field approximately three kilometres (2 mi) southwest of Durrus.

There are a number of Iron Age ringforts in the townlands of Ballycomane, Brahalish, Clonee, Drumtahaneen, Dunbeacon, Gortyalassa, Kealties, and Rushineska.

=== Built heritage ===
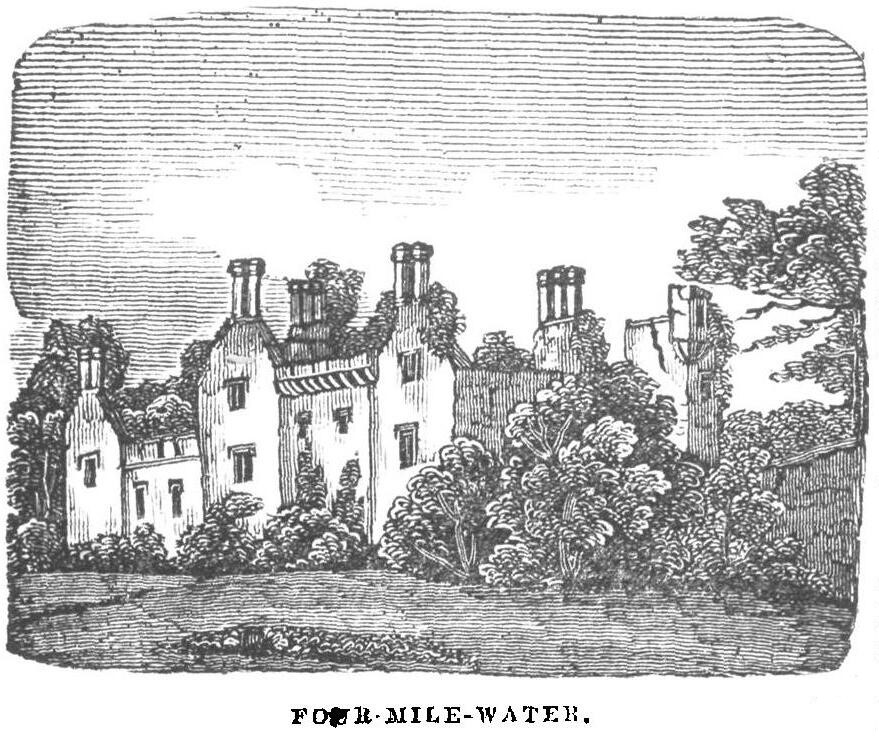
Cool na Long castle, Dublin Penny Journal 1835

The village is the location of Cool na Long castle, a fortified house built by the McCarthy (Muclagh) family in the 17th century.

The present layout of the village is based on works undertaken by the owners of the Bandon estate when the lease of Rev. Evanson's interest expired in 1854. Around this time a manor court for debt recovery was held once a month, with petty sessions once a fortnight. The former courthouse is still standing.

St James' Church was built in 1792, with a number of later 18th-century additions. The local Roman Catholic church was built in 1900.

== Geography ==
The civil parish of Durrus has an area of approximately 45 km^{2} (17 1/2 sq mi) and contains 28 townlands.

The Durrus River flows through the village and into Dunmanus Bay. The bay, and village lie at the head of the Sheep's Head and Mizen Head peninsulas.

== Sport and community ==
Local sports clubs include Muintir Bháire GAA, a Gaelic Athletic Association club which competes in the Carbery division. Durrus FC fields teams in the West Cork Soccer League.

The Durrus Festival involves sports, family and entertainment events, and typically takes place during July.

== Notable people ==
- Laura Geraldine Lennox (1883–1958), born in Durrus, suffragette in London, and a volunteer in Paris during the World War I.
- Sean Hurley (1887–1961), Sinologist born in Durrus.
- J. G. Farrell (1935–1979), English novelist who is buried in the cemetery of St James' Church, Durrus
- Seán Levis (born 1981), Gaelic footballer who played with the Cork senior football team

== Bibliography ==
- Lewis Cork, introduced by Tim Cadogan, The Collins Press (Original 1837), 1998 ISBN 1-898256-57-8.
- The Cole Family of West Carbery (ref: Coles Blaires Cove), Rev. Richard Lee Cole, M.A. B.D. Published privately Belfast 1943 and on Cole family genealogy site internet.
- Francis Humphries: History Of St. James Church and Parish, Forum Publications 1992 ISBN 0-9510018-5-X
- BHAS Journal vol 2 p. 106–119, townlands Donal Fitzgerald ISSN 0791-6612
- Archaeological Inventory of County Cork, Vol 1 West Cork, Office of Public Works, 1992 ISBN 0-7076-0175-4
- Níl aon leabhairín mar do Mheabhar-chinn fhéin. Eilís Uí Bhriain (Native of Durrus), A Collection of Old Irish Truisms and seasonal seanfhocail, ISBN 0-9554835-0-6,
