= Kilmacabea GAA =

GAA club in Cork, Ireland

Kilmacabea
- Cill Macaibí
- Founded: 1887
- County: Cork
- Nickname: Kilmac
- Colours
- Grounds: Kilmacabea GAA Grounds

Playing kits
Standard colours

Senior Club Championships
	All Ireland	Munster champions	Cork champions
Football:	0	0	0

Kilmacabea GAA is a Gaelic Athletic Association club in Leap, County Cork, Ireland. The club is affiliated to the Carbery Board and fields teams in both Gaelic football and hurling.

== History ==
Centred on the village of Leap, but also serving the Glandore and Connagh areas in West Cork, Kilmacabea GAA Club was founded in 1887, making it one of Cork's oldest clubs. Such was the strength of Gaelic football in the area, a Leap contingent broke away to form a new team called Geraldines in 1900. After a number of years of spearation, the two teams amalgamated under the banner of Kilmacabea.

Kilmacabea has spent the entirety of its existence operating in the junior grade. A number of divisional underage titles were won in the early 1990s, before the club's adult section won the Cork JBFC title in 1994. The period between 2017 and 2015 saw more successes, with Kilmacabea winning five Carbery JAFC titles. The club claimed a first ever Cork JAFC title in 2025, following a 1–14 to 1–07 win over Donoughmore in the final.

== Honours ==
- Cork Junior A Football Championship (1): 2025
- Carbery Junior A Football Championship (5): 2017, 2018, 2020, 2024, 2025
- Carbery Junior A Football League (3) 2006, 2015, 2017
- Cork Junior B Football Championship (1): 1994
- Carbery Junior B Football Championship (3): 1971, 1982, 1994
- Carbery Junior C Football Championship (3): 2004, 2012, 2013
- Carbery Junior D Football Championship (3): 1993, 2005, 2012
- Cork Minor C Hurling Championship (1): 2008 (as part of St. Fachtna's)
- Cork non exam Minor championship (1): 2007
- Cork Minor C Football League (1): 2005
- Carbery Minor A Football Championship (2): 1993, 1994
- Carbery Minor B Football Championship (1): 1998
- Carbery Under-21 B Football Championship (8): 1991, 1992, 1999, 2004, 2007, 2008, 2013, 2017
- Carbery Under-21 B Hurling Championship (1): 1972

== Notable players ==
- Damien Gore: All-Ireland U20 FC–winner (2019)
