= List of Cork Premier Junior Football Championship winners =

This is a list of all teams and players who have won the Cork Premier Junior Football Championship since its inception in 2023.

== By year ==
List of Cork Premier Junior Football Championship winners
Year	Team	Players	Ref
2025	Buttevant	R Donovan; M Walsh, J Whelan, K Crowley; S Madigan, K Bowles, J O’Neill; A O’Neill, K Lenahan; M Lenahan (c), C Hanlon, A Trimm; D Hanlon, M O’Neill, A Horgan. Subs: K Sheehan, D Ryan, B O’Riordan, B O’Connor, P Behan.	
2024	Kilmurry	J McDonnell; G O’Mahony, A O’Mahony, W Ronan; B Hinchion, T Collins, A Asling; K Kelleher, James O’Mullane; L Wall, Lawrence Asling, R Duggan; Lloyd Asling, John O’Mullane, P Berhanu. Subs: Joe O'Mullane, O Keane, J McGinn	
2023	St Finbarr's	C Keane; M Russell, D Byrne, J Kennefick; A McCarthy (c), A Lyne, C Steele; E Comyns, C Doolan; D O’Brien, C Walsh, F Crowley; O Murphy, M Shields, A Murphy. Subs: E Keane, J Murphy, C Madden, C O’Sullivan, C Buckley.	
