= List of Cork Premier Junior Football Championship runners-up =

This is a list of all teams and players who have lost the Cork Premier Junior Football Championship since its inception in 2023.

== By year ==
List of Cork Premier Junior Football Championship runners-up
Year	Team	Players	Ref
2025	St Nicholas'	R Cronin; D Dunlea, S Horgan, C Horgan; F O’Driscoll, E Varian, D Wall; R Downey, D Coughlan; G Marshall, J Brosnan, E Downey; J O’Sullivan, E O’Leary, D Morris (c). Subs: D Brosnan, J Corkery, L Quilligan, Z Lynch, C McCarthy.	
2024	Canovee	B Cheasty; B Ring, E Lehane, C Cronin; W Ahern (c), R Delaney, O O’Driscoll; A Murphy, C Dodd; C O’Neill, D McMahon, J Moynihan; J Kelleher, B McNabola, M Healy. Subs: P O'Leary, S Riordan, E Dodd, S O'Connor, P Healy	
2023	Kilmurry	J McDonnell; B Hinchion, K Barrett, W Ronan (c), T Collins, G O’Mahony, D Cahalane; K Kelleher, J O’Mullane; L Wall, L Aisling, A Aisling; S Warren, J Ryan, P Berhanu. Subs: R Duggan, R Leahy, J O’Mullane.	
