= 2026 Cork Premier Junior Football Championship =

Annual Gaelic football competition season

- Dates: 24 July – 25 October 2026
- Teams: 12
- Sponsor: McCarthy Insurance Group
- Champions: Canovee (1st title); Evan Dodd (captain); Liam Kelleher (captain); Kieran Cronin (manager)
- Runners-up: Cobh; Seán Cummins (captain); Declan O'Connell (manager)
- Relegated: Na Piarsaigh

Tournament statistics
- Matches played: 24
- Goals scored: 60 (2.5 per match)
- Points scored: 566 (23.58 per match)
- Top scorer: Jack Kelleher (2–26)

The 2026 Cork Premier Junior Football Championship was the fourth staging of the Cork Premier Junior Football Championship since its establishment by the Cork County Board in 2023. The draw for the group stage placings took place on 9 December 2025. The championship ran from 24 July to 25 October 2026.

The final was played on 25 October 2026 at SuperValu Páirc Uí Chaoimh in Cork, between Canovee and Cobh, in what was their first ever meeting in the final. Canovee won the match by 0-10 to 0-09 to claim their first ever championship title.

Canovee's Jack Kelleher was the championship's top scorer with 2-26.

== Team changes ==
=== To Championship ===
Relegated from the Cork Intermediate A Football Championship

- St Vincent's

Promoted from the Cork Junior A Football Championship

- Kilmacabea

=== From Championship ===
Promoted to the Cork Intermediate A Football Championship

- Buttevant

Relegated to the Duhallow Junior A Football Championship

- Ballydesmond

== Group 1 ==
=== Group 1 table ===
Quarter-finalist

Team	Matches				Score			Pts
Team	Pld	W	D	L	For	Against	Diff	Pts
Kinsale	3	2	0	1	49	44	5	4
Millstreet	3	2	0	1	57	53	4	4
Cullen	3	1	0	2	44	47	-3	2
St Vincent's	3	1	0	2	49	55	-6	2

=== Group 1 results ===
25 July 2026 Round 1	Cullen	2-12 - 1-08	St Vincent's	O'Connell Memorial Park
	L Murphy 1-4, C Walsh 1-0, A Nolan 0-2, F Cronin 0-1, D Hickey 0-1, D O'Leary 0-1, L Hickey 0-1, M Twomey 0-1, F O'Dwyer 0-1.	Report	B Hornibrook 1-1, S Daly 0-3, L Callinan 0-2, B Long 0-1, G McCarthy 0-1.

25 July 2026 Round 1	Millstreet	0-14 - 0-19	Kinsale	Páirc Traolach Mac Suibhne
	D Cashman 0-5, H Linehan 0-3, S Hickey 0-3, K Crowley 0-2, A O'Leary 0-1.	Report	M Murphy 0-5, S Byrne 0-4, J O'Brien 0-4, B Coughlan 0-3, G Kearney 0-2, S O'Neill 0-1.

15 August 2026 Round 2	Kinsale	1-16 - 0-10	Cullen	Páirc Uí Chonchúir
	G Finn 1-3, M Murphy 0-4, B Coughlan 0-3, J Murphy 0-2, N Ryan 0-2, J O'Brien 0-1, B O'Neill 0-1.		L Murphy 0-5, A Nolan 0-3, J Hickey 0-1, S Fleming 0-1.

16 August 2026 Round 2	St Vincent's	1-15 - 3-17	Millstreet	Páirc Eoin Mhic Charthaigh
	B Murphy 0-8, C O'Mahony 1-0, S Daly 0-2, A Sorenson 0-1, G Kelleher 0-1, B Long 0-1.	Report	D Cashman 0-8, H Linehan 2-2, E O’Sullivan 1-1.

11 September 2026 Round 3	Cullen	2-10 - 1-14	Millstreet	Knocknagree Grounds
	L Murphy 2-7, F O'Dwyer 0-2, L Hickey 0-1.	Report	D Cashman 0-9, H Linehan 1-2, M Ellis 0-1, E O'Sullivan 0-1, A Pearse 0-1.

11 September 2026 Round 3	St Vincent's	2-14 - 0-11	Kinsale	Ballymartle Grounds
	B Long 2-0 (1-0 pen), B Murphy 0-6 (2 2pt, 1 2pt f), L Callanan, C O’Mahony (1 2pt each), S Murphy 0-2, A Harte, K Murphy 0-1 each.	Report	C Finn 0-5 (0-2 f), B Coughlan (f), M Murphy, J Murphy, J O’Brien, T Broderick 0-1.

== Group 2 ==
=== Group 2 table ===
Semi-finalist Quarter-finalist Relegation playoff

Team	Matches				Score			Pts
Team	Pld	W	D	L	For	Against	Diff	Pts
Cobh	3	2	1	0	51	41	10	5
Inniscarra	3	2	0	1	50	42	8	4
Glenville	3	0	2	1	40	47	-7	2
Urhan	3	0	1	2	41	52	-11	1

=== Group 2 results ===
24 July 2026 Round 1	Inniscarra	0-16 - 1-15	Cobh	Blarney Grounds
		Report	D Kearney 1-4, M O’Rourke 0-2, S Cummins 0-2, E Hastings 0-2, E Cullimore 0-2, A Doran 0-1, A Lynch 0-1/

25 July 2026 Round 1	Glenville	2-10 - 1-13	Urhan	St Mary's Park
	C O’Leary 1-3, É Fitzgerald 1-2, C O'Keeffe 0-3, A Murphy 0-1, C Linehan 0-1.	Report	J O'Neill 1-4, C O'Sullivan 0-4.

15 August 2026 Round 2	Urhan	1-08 - 1-11	Inniscarra	St Colum's Park
	B Sullivan 1-2, C Crowley 0-3, J O'Neill 0-2, C O'Shea 0-1.	Report	L O'Connor 1-6, D Murphy 0-5.

15 August 2026 Round 2	Cobh	0-11 - 1-08	Glenville	Páirc LiosgCúl
		Report	L Foley (1-1), C Linehan (0-3), Callum O’Mahony (0-2); D McCarthy (0-2).

11 September 2026 Round 3	Cobh	5-07 - 0-14	Urhan	Sam Maguire Park
	E Hastings 0-4 (0-2 f, 1 2pt f), E Cullimore 1-1 (0-1 f), A Lynch, B Geary, A Doran, E Cummins 1-0 each, T Wilk, S Cummins 0-1 each.	Report	B Sullivan 0-6, J O’Neill (0-2 f), A Elphick, C Crowley (1 2pt f) 0-2 each, R McCarthy, J O’Shea 0-1 each.

11 September 2026 Round 3	Inniscarra	3-11 - 1-10	Glenville	Éire Óg Grounds
	L O’Connor 2-2 (0-1 f), S McCarthy 0-5, D Murphy 1-0, S Dornan, D O’Connell 0-2 each.	Report	C O’Leary (1 2pt f), A Murphy (1 2pt) 0-4 each, S Curtin 1-0, C Linehan, Callum O’Mahony 0-1 each.

== Group 3 ==
=== Group 3 table ===
Semi-finalist Quarter-finalist Relegation playoff

Team	Matches				Score			Pts
Team	Pld	W	D	L	For	Against	Diff	Pts
Canovee	3	2	1	0	67	27	40	5
St Nicholas'	3	2	0	1	55	53	2	4
Kilmacabea	3	1	1	1	47	35	13	3
Na Piarsaigh (R)	3	0	0	3	28	82	-54	0

=== Group 3 results ===
24 July 2026 Round 1	Canovee	2-23 - 0-09	St Nicholas'	Ballymah GAA Field
	C Dodd 0-10 (4 tp), J Kelleher 1-4 (0-3 f), J Moynihan 1-1, E Lehane, J Riordan (0-2 f) 0-3 each, S O’Connor 0-2.	Report	D Brosnan 0-3 (0-1 f), J O’Sullivan (1 tpf), S Kennefick 0-2 (tp) each, D Morris, K Kelleher 0-1 each

25 July 2026 Round 1	Na Piarsaigh	1-06 - 2-18	Kilmacabea	Henry Ford Park
	P Murphy 1-4, SP Cooke 0-1, C Hogan 0-1.	Report	D Gore 0-9, E Shanahan 1-3, R Shanahan 1-0, C McCarthy 0-2, I Jennings 0-1, D McCarthy 0-1, D O'Callaghan 0-1, J Keating 0-1.

15 August 2026 Round 2	St Nicholas'	6-12 - 2-05	Na Piarsaigh	Páirc Uinsinn
	K Kelleher 2-1, C McCarthy 1-2, J O'Sullivan 1-2, R Dunne 1-1, E Downey 1-0, L Quilligan 0-2, D Morris 0-2, R Downey 0-1, F O'Driscoll 0-1.	Report

16 August 2026 Round 2	Kilmacabea	0-10 - 0-10	Canovee	Páirc Cill Mhichíl
	C McCarthy 0-6, I Jennings 0-1, D McCarthy 0-1, K Whelton 0-1, E Shanahan 0-1.	Report

11 September 2026 Round 3	Canovee	4-16 - 0-08	Na Piarsaigh	Páirc Uí Rinn
		Report

11 September 2026 Round 3	St Nicholas'	2-10 - 1-10	Kilmacabea	Castle Grounds
	J O’Sullivan 0-7 (1 2ptf, 0-1 f), C McCarthy 1-1, R Downey 1-0, D Dunlea, D Morris 0-1 each.	Report	E Shanahan 0-8 (0-5f), I Jennings 1-1, L McCarthy 0-1.

== Relegation stage ==
=== Relegation final ===
26 September 2026 Relegation final	Urhan	0-16 - 0-11	Na Piarsaigh	Páirc na hAidhlean

== Knockout stage ==
=== Quarter-finals ===
26 September 2026 Quarter-final	Kinsale	1-13 - 2-14	St Nicholas'	Ted Hanley Memorial Park
	G Finn 1-1 (1-0 pen), M Murphy 0-4 (0-1 f), B Coughlan 0-3 (1 2pt f), J Murphy, G Kearney 0-2 each, Rory O’Brien 0-1.	Report	R Downey 1-1, Jack O’Sullivan (0-3 f, 0-1 45), C McCarthy (1 2pt) 0-4 each, D Morris 1-0, E Downey (2pt), D Brosnan (2pt) 0-2 each, Z Lynch 0-1.

27 September 2026 Quarter-final	Millstreet	1-06 - 1-16	Inniscarra	Carrigadrohid Grounds

=== Semi-finals ===
9 October 2026 Semi-final	Canovee	3-13 - 0-10	Inniscarra	Tom Creedon Park
	J Kelleher 0-7 (1 2pt, 0-1 f, 0-1 45), D McMahon 2-0 (1-0 pen), G Coleman 1-0, E Dodd 0-3 (1 2pt), J Riordan 0-2 f, E Lehane 0-1.	Report	D Murphy (0-3f) 0-5, L O’Connor 0-4 (1 2pt, 0-1f), S Dornan 0-1.

10 October 2026 Semi-final	Cobh	3-21 - 0-06	St Nicholas'	Páirc Shéamuis de Barra
	E Cullimore 0-7 (1 2pt f, 1 2pt, 0-3 f), A Lynch, E Cummins 1-2 each, D Kearney 1-1, M O’Rourke, T Wilk (2pt), E Hastings (2pt) 0-2 each, C McLoughlin, A Hastings, C Farrell 0-1 each.	Report	Z Lynch 0-3 (1 2pt), R Dunne, J O’Sullivan (f), C McCarthy 0-1 each.

=== Final ===
25 October 2026 Final	Canovee	0-10 - 0-09	Cobh	SuperValu Páirc Uí Chaoimh
	J Kelleher 0-3 (0-1 f), D McMahon 0-2, E Dodd (45), P Buckley, O O’Driscoll, E Lehane, C O’Neill 0-1 each.	Report	T Wilk 0-3 (1 2pt), E Cullimore (1 2pt, 0-1 f) 0-3 each, A McCarthy, E Cummins, A Doran 0-1.	Referee: N Hayes (Carbery Rangers)
