= 2026 Cork Intermediate A Football Championship =

Annual Gaelic football competition season

- Dates: 23 July – 30 October 2026
- Teams: 12
- Sponsor: McCarthy Insurance Group
- Champions: Kilmurry (2nd title); William Ronan (captain); Brian Harte (manager)
- Runners-up: Buttevant; Mark Lenahan (captain); Joey Hanlon (manager)
- Relegated: Glanworth

Tournament statistics
- Matches played: 25
- Goals scored: 51 (2.04 per match)
- Points scored: 642 (25.68 per match)
- Top scorer: David O'Connor (3–28)

The 2026 Cork Intermediate A Football Championship was the 91st staging of the Cork Intermediate A Football Championship since its establishment by the Cork County Board in 1909. The draw for the group stage placings took place on 9 December 2025. The championship ran from 23 July to 30 October 2026.

The final was played on 30 October 2026 at SuperValu Páirc Uí Chaoimh in Cork, between Kilmurry and Buttevant, in what was their first ever meeting in the final. Kilmurry won the match by 2–18 to 0–10 to claim their second championship title overall and a first titles in 93 years.

Boherbue's David O'Connor was the championship's top scorer with 3–28.

== Team changes ==
=== To Championship ===
Relegated from the Cork Premier Intermediate Football Championship

- Bandon

Promoted from the Cork Premier Junior Football Championship

- Buttevant

=== From Championship ===
Promoted to the Cork Premier Intermediate Football Championship

- Ballinora

Relegated to the Cork Premier Junior Football Championship

- St Vincent's

== Group 1 ==
=== Group 1 table ===
Semi-finalist Quarter-finalist Relegation playoff

Team	Matches				Score			Pts
Team	Pld	W	D	L	For	Against	Diff	Pts
Kilmurry	3	3	0	0	51	36	15	6
Buttevant	3	2	0	1	58	34	24	4
Ilen Rovers	3	1	0	2	50	52	-2	2
Glanworth (R)	3	0	0	3	24	61	-37	0

=== Group 1 results ===
24 July 2026 Round 1	Buttevant	2-17 - 0-03	Glanworth	Kildorrery Grounds
	D Hanlon 0-9, M Lenahan 2-1, A Horgan 0-2, M O'Neill 0-2, A Trimm 0-1, B O'Riordan 0-1, S Madigan 0-1.	Report	D Pyne 0-1, D O'Brien 0-1, T Linehan 0-1.

26 July 2026 Round 1	Ilen Rovers	1-11 - 2-12	Kilmurry	Ballinacarriga Grounds
	A O'Driscoll 0-6, J Collins 1-0, K O'Driscoll 0-2, A O'Sullivan 0-1, S Connolly 0-1, P Collins 0-1.	Report	R Ó Curraoin 2-5, J McGinn 0-3, L Wall 0-3, J O'Mullane 0-1.

15 August 2026 Round 2	Glanworth	0-14 - 1-18	Ilen Rovers	Ted Hanley Memorial Park
	D O'Brien 0-5, S Cunningham 0-4, J O'Sullivan 0-2, S Condon 0-2, D O'Brien 0-1.	Report	M Sheehy 0-6, A O'Driscoll 0-6, S Minihane 1-0, D O'Driscoll 0-2, D O'Donovan 0-1, D Coakley 0-1, S Casey 0-1, S O'Shea 0-1.

15 August 2026 Round 2	Kilmurry	0-16 - 2-09	Buttevant	Kanturk Grounds
	D O'Mullane 0-6, T Collins 0-3, R Duggan 0-3, J McGinn 0-2, R Ó Curraoin 0-1, L Wall 0-1.		C Hanlon 1-3, M Lenahan 1-1, D Hanlon 0-1, A Trimm 0-1, K Crowley 0-1, S Madigan 0-1, M O'Neill 0-1.

12 September 2026 Round 3	Ilen Rovers	0-15 - 1-17	Buttevant	Carrigadrohid Grounds
	P O’Driscoll 0-4 (1 2pt), A O’Driscoll 0-3 (0-1f), A Fahy, S Connolly 0-2 each, D Hegarty, A O’Sullivan, S Minihane, A Holland 0-1 each.	Report	M Lenahan 1-4 (1 2pt), D Hanlon (1 2pt, 1 2ptf), C Hanlon (2 2pts) 0-6 each, S Madigan 0-1.

12 September 2026 Round 3	Kilmurry	2-11 - 0-07	Glanworth	Páirc Dhónaill Uí Cheallacháin
		Report

== Group 2 ==
=== Group 2 table ===
Semi-finalist Quarter-finalist Relegation playoff

Team	Matches				Score			Pts
Team	Pld	W	D	L	For	Against	Diff	Pts
Dromtarriffe	3	2	0	1	65	56	9	4
Mitchelstown	3	2	0	1	60	53	7	4
Gabriel Rangers	3	1	0	2	55	57	-2	2
St Finbarr's	3	1	0	2	43	57	-14	2

=== Group 2 results ===
23 July 2026 Round 1	Gabriel Rangers	0-15 - 4-11	Mitchelstown	Páirc Uinsinn
	S Kelleher 0-5 (1 2pt f), J O’Brien, E Goggin (0-2 f), K O’Driscoll 0-3 each, G O’Callaghan 0-1.	Report	C O’Mahony 1-4 (1 2pt, 1-0 pen, 0-1 f), S Beston 1-1, R Murphy, C Hyland 1-0 each, A O’Brien 0-2 (0-1 f), Conor Walsh, Cathal Walsh, J Sheehan, M Walsh 0-1 each.

25 July 2026 Round 1	St Finbarr's	1-16 - 0-17	Dromtarriffe	Clondrohid Grounds
	M Shields 0-5, D O'Brien 1-0, A Buckley 0-3, C O'Sullivan 0-3, J Buttimer 0-1, I O'Callaghan 0-1, T Howe 0-1.	Report	E Murphy 0-8, Conor O'Callaghan 0-3, A Healy 0-3, M O'Callaghan 0-1, F McKee 0-1.

15 August 2026 Round 2	Dromtarriffe	3-15 - 3-13	Gabriel Rangers	Páirc Uí Chuana
	E Murphy 2-1, D O'Connor 1-1, Conor O'Callaghan 0-4, A Healy 0-2, T Howard 0-2, J Kelleher 0-1, B O'Keeffe 0-1, D Ward 0-1, M O'Connor 0-1.	Report	E Goggin 2-5, K O'Driscoll 1-3, D O'Regan 0-1, S Kelleher 0-1, L O'Brien 0-1, G O'Callaghan 0-1, G Coughlan 0-1.

15 August 2026 Round 2	Mitchelstown	1-19 - 0-14	St Finbarr's	Mourneabbey Grounds
	A O'Brien 1-6, S Walsh 0-6, S Kenneally 0-2, M Walsh 0-2, C Keane-Hyland 0-1, J O'Sullivan 0-1, J Sheehan 0-1.	Report	C O'Sullivan 0-6, D O'Brien 0-3, A Buckley 0-2, M Shields 0-2, T Howe 0-1.

12 September 2026 Round 3	Gabriel Rangers	2-12 - 0-10	St Finbarr's	Ballinacarriga
	E Goggin 1-3, K O’Driscoll 0-3, E O’Brien 1-0, S Kelleher (1 2ptf), P O’Driscoll 0-2 each, G O’Callaghan, C Moynihan 0-1 each.	Report	C O’Sullivan (0-1 45), D O’Brien (1 2ptf), E Keane (0-1f) 0-2 each, J Buttimer, C Crowley, C Steele, T O’Keefe 0-1 each.

12 September 2026 Round 3	Mitchelstown	0-15 - 4-12	Dromtarriffe	Dr Croke Park
	C O'Mahony 0-7 (0-2 f, 1 2pt) S Walsh 0-5 (1 2pt) C Keane Hyland, S Beston, C Walsh 0-1 each.	Report	E Murphy 2-4 (1-0 f, 1 2pt), A Healy 1-3, D O'Keeffe 1-2, B O'Keeffe, M O'Callaghan, C O'Callaghan (f) 0-1 each.

== Group 3 ==
=== Group 3 table ===
Semi-finalist Quarter-finalist Relegation playoff

Team	Matches				Score			Pts
Team	Pld	W	D	L	For	Against	Diff	Pts
Adrigole	3	3	0	0	44	34	10	6
Boherbue	3	2	0	1	47	42	5	4
Bandon	3	0	1	2	37	43	-6	1
Kildorrery	3	0	1	2	38	47	-9	1

=== Group 3 results ===
25 July 2026 Round 1	Bandon	0-13 - 0-18	Adrigole	O'Donovan Rossa Park
	M Cahalane 0-5, M Sugrue 0-5, C Calnan 0-2, C Long 0-1.		C O'Shea 0-6, B O'Sullivan 0-5, C O'Sullivan 0-3, T O'Connor 0-2, F Carey 0-1, N O'Sullivan 0-1.

25 July 2026 Round 1	Boherbue	2-16 - 3-08	Kildorrery	Fr Con Buckley Park
	D O’Connor 1-6, J Corkery 0-6, D Moynihan 1-0, G O'Sullivan 0-1, K Cremin 0-1, L Moynihan 0-1, D Sheehan 0-1.		S O'Neill 1-1, F Stapleton 1-0, J McEniry 1-0, L Keating 0-3, P O'Brien 0-2, S Fitzgerald 0-2.

15 August 2026 Round 2	Adrigole	0-12 - 0-11	Boherbue	Sam Maguire Park
	C O'Shea 0-5, C O'Sullivan 0-4, T O'Connor 0-2, B O'Sullivan 0-1.		D O'Connor 0-5, J Corkery 0-4, L Moynihan 0-1, G O'Sullivan 0-1.

16 August 2026 Round 2	Kildorrery	1-08 - 0-11	Bandon	Páirc Dhónaill Uí Cheallacháin
	K Hurley 1-0, S O’Neill, W Fouhy 0-2 each, A Crowley 0-2 (1 2pt f), P O’Brien, C Coughlan 0-1 each.	Report	M Sugrue 0-5 (0-2 f, 1 2pt f), J Cullinane 0-3 (1 2pt), M Cahalane (f), J Calnan, C Calnan 0-1 each.

12 September 2026 Round 3	Bandon	0-13 - 1-11	Boherbue	Páirc Traolach Mac Suibhne
	M Cahalane 0-6, J Calnan 0-2, M Sugrue 0-2, K Hannon 0-1, J Cullinane 0-1.	Report	D O'Connor 1-7, G O'Sullivan 0-2, J Corkery 0-1, D Buckley 0-1.

12 September 2026 Round 3	Adrigole	2-08 - 0-10	Kildorrery	Brinny Sportsfield
	T O'Connor 0-3, B O'Sullivan 1-1, D Harrington 1-1, C O'Shea 0-2, C O'Sullivan 0-1.	Report

== Relegation stage ==
=== Relegation final ===
27 September 2026 Relegation final	Kildorrery	3-10 - 0-19 (aet)	Glanworth	Shanballymore Grounds
	L Keating 2-0 (1-0 pen), K Hurley 1-0, J Keating 0-3 (1 2pt), A Crowley 0-3 (1 2pt f), J Hunter 0-2, S Fitzgerald, T Murphy 0-1 each.	Report	D Pyne 0-12 (4 2pt f), D O’Brien 0-5 (1 2pt), G O’Neill, S O’Riordan 0-1 each.

10 October 2026 Relegation final replay	Kildorrery	0-09 - 0-08	Glanworth	Shanballymore Grounds
	A Crowley (f), P O’Brien (2pt), C Coughlan (2pt), 0-2 each, T O’Sullivan, K Hurley, S Fitzgerald 0-1 each.	Report	D Pyne 0-6 (2 2pt f, 0-1 f), D O’Brien, P Hannon 0-1 each.

== Knockout stage ==
=== Quarter-finals ===
25 September 2026 Quarter-final	Dromtarriffe	0-12 - 0-15	Boherbue	Páirc Nóra Ní Iarlaithe
	C O’Callaghan 0-4 (1 2pt f, 1 2pt), E Murphy 0-3 (0-2 f, 0-1 45), A Healy 0-2, D O’Connor, D Ward, D O’Keeffe 0-1 each.	Report	D O’Connor 0-9 (0-5 f), J Corkery 0-3 (1 2pt f), G O’Sullivan 0-2, L Moynihan 0-1.

26 September 2026 Quarter-final	Buttevant	1-16 - 2-12	Mitchelstown	Glanworth Grounds
	C Hanlon 0-7 (3 2pt f), M Lenehan 0-6 (2 2pt), A Trimm 1-1, D Hanlon 0-2 (0-1 f).	Report	M Walsh 1-2, S Walsh 0-4 (1 2pt), C O’Mahony 0-3 (0-1 f, 1 2pt), R Murphy 1-0, J Sheehan (f), M Keane, S Kenneally 0-1 each.

=== Semi-finals ===
9 October 2026 Semi-final	Kilmurry	1-19 - 2-07	Boherbue	Clyda Rovers Grounds
	R Ó Curraoín 1-4 (2 2pt), L Wall 0-5 (2 2pt), D O’Mullane 0-4 (0-3 f), L Asling (1 2pt), K Kelleher 0-2 each, James O’Mullane, S O’Leary 0-1 each.	Report	J Corkery 1-6 (1 2pt, 1 2pt f, 0-1 45), D O’Connor 1-1 (0-1 f).

10 October 2026 Semi-final	Adrigole	2-10 - 0-19	Buttevant	Kilmichael Grounds
	T O’Connor 1-2 (1 2pt), N O’Sullivan 1-0, C O’Shea 0-3 (0-2 f), C O’Sullivan (1 2pt), D Harrington (1 2pt) 0-2 each, B O’Sullivan 0-1.	Report	M Lenahan 0-8, D Hanlon 0-5 (1 2pt, 0-1 f), A Trimm, K Sheehan, C Hanlon, A Horgan, T O’Connell, R Fowley 0-1 each.

=== Final ===
30 October 2026 Final	Kilmurry	2-18 - 0-10	Buttevant	SuperValu Páirc Uí Chaoimh
	L Wall 1-4 (1 2pt), R Ó Curraoín 1-2, D O’Mullane 0-4 (1 2pt f, 0-1 f), J McGinn (0-1 f), T Collins 0-2 each, K Kelleher, L Asling, J Ryan (0-1 f), S O’Leary 0-1 each.	Report	C Hanlon 0-4 (1 2pt, 0-1 f), M Lenahan, D Hanlon (1 2pt f) 0-2 each, M O’Neill, A Horgan 0-1 each.	Referee: B Crowley (Castlehaven)

== Championship statistics ==
=== Top scorers ===
Rank	Player	Club	Tally	Total	Matches	Average
1	David O'Connor	Boherbue	3-28	37	5	7.40
2	Mark Lenahan	Buttevant	4-22	34	6	5.66
3	Evan Murphy	Dromtarriffe	4-16	28	4	7.00
4	Ruadhán Ó Curraoín	Kilmurry	4-15	27	5	5.40
5	David Hanlon	Buttevant	0-25	25	6	4.16
6	Conor Hanlon	Buttevant	1-21	24	6	4.00
7	John Corkery	Boherbue	1-20	23	5	4.60
8	David Pyne	Glanworth	0-22	22	5	4.40
9	Eddie Goggin	Gabriel Rangers	3-10	19	3	6.33
10	Cathail O'Mahony	Mitchelstown	1-14	17	3	5.66
