= 2014 Cork Junior A Football Championship =

- Dates: 14 September – 25 October 2014
- Teams: 8
- Sponsor: Evening Echo
- Champions: Millstreet (3rd title); Michael Vaughan (captain)
- Runners-up: St Finbarr's; Paul Kennedy (captain)

Tournament statistics
- Matches played: 8
- Goals scored: 14 (1.75 per match)
- Points scored: 138 (17.25 per match)
- Top scorer(s): Michael Vaughan (1–13)

The 2014 Cork Junior A Football Championship was the 116th staging of the Cork Junior A Football Championship since its establishment by Cork County Board in 1895. The championship ran from 14 September to 25 October 2014.

The final was played on 25 October 2014 at Páirc Uí Rinn in Cork, between Millstreet and St Finbarr's, in what was their first ever meeting in the final. Millstreet won the match by 1–09 to 1–08 to claim their third championship title overall and a first title in 51 years.

Millstreet's Michael Vaughan was the championship's top scorer with 1–13.

== Qualification ==
| Division | Championship | Representatives |
|---|---|---|
| Avondhu | North Cork Junior A Football Championship | Kilshannig |
| Beara | Beara Junior A Football Championship | Garnish |
| Carbery | South West Junior A Football Championship | St Mary's |
| Carrigdhoun | South East Junior A Football Championship | Ballygarvan |
| Duhallow | Duhallow Junior A Football Championship | Millstreet |
| Imokilly | East Cork Junior A Football Championship | Glenbower Rovers |
| Muskerry | Mid Cork Junior A Football Championship | Kilmurry |
| Seandún | City Junior A Football Championship | St Finbarr's |

== Results ==
=== Quarter-finals ===
| 14 September 2014 Quarter-final | Ballygarvan | 1–12 – 0–08 | Garnish | Wolfe Tone Park |
| | M O'Riordan 1–4, D McCarthy 0–4, D O'Sullivan 0–3, C O'Sullivan 0–1. | | P O'Neill 0–5, D Henshaw 0–1, J Harrington 0–1. |

| 19 September 2014 Quarter-final | Glenbower Rovers | 0–07 – 2–05 | Millstreet | Páirc Uí Rinn |
| | K Lane 0–2, B McCarthy 0–2, J Deane 0–2, K O'Brien 0–1. | | M Vaughan 1–3, M Ellis 1–0, M Murphy 0–1, K Crowley 0–1. |

| 26 September 2014 Quarter-final | Kilmurry | 1–10 – 0–10 | St Mary's | Sam Maguire Park |
| | J Buckley 0–4, J Ryan 0–4, D O'Leary 1–0, A Healy 0–1, D Cahalane 0–1. | | C Daly 0–3, P Daly 0–2, J Daly 0–2, R O'Connor 0–1, C McGillycuddy 0–1, B McCarthy 0–1. |

| 28 September 2014 Quarter-final | St Finbarr's | 2–09 – 3–06 | Kilshannig | Felix Sarsfield Memorial Park |
| | P Harte 1–3, R Leahy 1–1, P Murphy 0–2, C McCarthy 0–1, J O'Donoghue 0–1, D Comyns 0–1. | | T Kelly 2–0, P O'Connell 1–0, K O'Hanlon 0–3, E O'Sullivan 0–1, T O'Sullivan 0–1, D O'Callaghan 0–1. |

| 4 October 2014 Quarter-final replay | St Finbarr's | 2–11 – 0–08 | Kilshannig | Felix Sarsfield Memorial Park |
| | A Lyons 2–1, R Leahy 0–3, C McCarthy 0–2, P Harte 0–2, M Russell 0–1, C Madden 0–1, E Comyns 0–1. | | K O'Hanlon 0–4, T Kelly 0–2, T O'Sullivan 0–1, P Cronin 0–1. |

=== Semi-finals ===
| 5 October 2014 Semi-final | Millstreet | 1–11 – 0–10 | Kilmurry | Castle Grounds |
| | M Vaughan 0–8, M Ellis 1–1, B Sheehan 0–1, T Collins 0–1. | | J Buckley 0–4, J Ryan 0–2, E Barrett 0–1, D O'Halloran 0–1, J White 0–1, D McCarthy 0–1. |

| 11 October 2014 Semi-final | St Finbarr's | 0–08 – 0–06 | Ballygarvan | Ted Hanley Memorial Park |
| | R Leahy 0–3, D Comyns 0–2, J O'Donoghue 0–1, C McCarthy 0–1, P Harte 0–1. | | M O'Riordan 0–3, D McCarthy 0–2, D Murphy 0–1. |

=== Final ===
| 25 October 2014 Final | Millstreet | 1–09 – 1–08 | St Finbarr's | Páirc Uí Rinn |
| | C Crowley 1–1, M Vaughan, M Murphy 0–2 each, J Broxton, T Collins, K Crowley, D Kiely 0–1 each. | Report | P Harte 1–1 (1–0 penalty, one free), E Finn 0–2, E Comyns, D O’Brien, C Madden, C McCarthy, J O’Donoghue 0–1 each. | Referee: M Collins (Clonakilty) |

== Championship statistics ==
=== Top scorers ===
| Rank | Player | Club | Tally | Total | Matches | Average |
|---|---|---|---|---|---|---|
| 1 | Michael Vaughan | Millstreet | 1–13 | 16 | 3 | 5.33 |
| 2 | Paul Harte | St Finbarr's | 2–07 | 13 | 4 | 3.25 |
| 3 | Matthew O'Riordan | Ballygarvan | 1–07 | 10 | 2 | 5.00 |
| 3 | Roy Leahy | St Finbarr's | 1–07 | 10 | 4 | 2.50 |
| 5 | Tony Kelly | Kilshannig | 2–02 | 8 | 2 | 4.00 |
| 5 | Jonathan Buckley | Kilmurry | 0–08 | 8 | 2 | 4.00 |
| 7 | Adam Lyne | St Finbarr's | 2–01 | 7 | 4 | 1.75 |
| 7 | Mark Mllis | Millstreet | 2–01 | 7 | 3 | 2.33 |
| 7 | Killian O'Hanlon | Kilshannig | 0–07 | 7 | 2 | 3.50 |
| 10 | Joe Ryan | Kilmurry | 0–06 | 6 | 2 | 3.00 |
| 10 | Dan McCarthy | Ballygarvan | 0–06 | 6 | 2 | 3.00 |
