= 2024 Cork Premier Junior Football Championship =

Annual Gaelic football competition season

- Dates: 26 July - 25 October 2024
- Teams: 12
- Sponsor: McCarthy Insurance Group
- Champions: Kilmurry (1st title); William Ronan (captain); Cormac Linehan (manager)
- Runners-up: Canovee; William Ahern (captain); John O'Brien (manager)
- Relegated: St James'

Tournament statistics
- Matches played: 24
- Goals scored: 55 (2.29 per match)
- Points scored: 468 (19.5 per match)
- Top scorer(s): Mark Lenahan (6-14)

The 2024 Cork Premier Junior Football Championship was the second staging of the Cork Premier Junior Football Championship since its establishment by the Cork County Board in 2023. The draw for the group stage placings took place on 14 December 2023. The championship ran from 26 July to 25 October 2024.

The final was played on 25 October 2024 at SuperValu Páirc Uí Chaoimh in Cork, between Kilmurry and Canovee, in what was their first ever meeting in the final. Kilmurry won the match by 0-10 to 1-06 to claim their first ever championship title in the grade.

Buttevant's Mark Lenahan was the championship's top scorer with 6-14.

== Team changes ==
=== To Championship ===
Relegated from the Cork Intermediate A Football Championship

- Glenville

Promoted from the Cork Junior A Football Championship

- Canovee

=== From Championship ===
Promoted to the Cork Intermediate A Football Championship

- St Finbarr's

Relegated to the City Junior A Football Championship

- St MIchael's

== Group A ==
=== Group A table ===
Quarter-finalists Relegation playoff

Team	Matches				Score			Pts
Team	Pld	W	D	L	For	Against	Diff	Pts
Canovee	3	2	1	0	43	32	11	5
Kilmurry	3	2	0	1	33	36	-3	4
Cobh	3	1	1	1	38	32	6	3
St James'	3	0	0	3	32	46	-14	0

=== Group A results ===
27 July 2024 Round 1	Canovee	1-14 - 0-11	St James'	Páirc Naomh Eoin
	D McMahon 1-2, J Kelleher 0-5, J Moynihan 0-2, M Healy 0-2, S O'Connor 0-1, C Dodd 0-1, C O'Neill 0-1. D McMahon 1-2, J Kelleher 0-5, J Moynihan 0-2, M Healy 0-2.	Report	Joe O'Sullivan 0-7, J O'Driscoll 0-2, C Hayes 0-1, F Hayes 0-1.

28 July 2024 Round 1	Kilmurry	1-08 - 1-07	Cobh	Ballyanley Grounds
	James O'Mullane 1-0, J McGinn 0-2, L Wall 0-2, D Cahalane 0-1, K Kelleher 0-1, Joe O'Mullane 0-1.	Report

17 August 2024 Round 2	Cobh	1-09 - 0-12	Canovee	Caherlag Grounds
	N O'Connell 0-5, J Ronan 1-1, J McCarthy 0-1, S Cummins 0-1, A Lynch 0-1.		J Kelleher 0-6, D McMahon 0-3, J Moynihan 0-1, C O'Neill 0-1, C Dodd 0-1.

18 August 2024 Round 2	St James'	1-09 - 2-07	Kilmurry	Páirc Naomh Eoin
	Joe O'Sullivan 0-4, James O'Sullivan 1-0, M McCarthy 0-1, K O'Leary 0-1, F Hayes 0-1, C Hayes 0-1, J O'Driscoll 0-1.		K Kelleher 1-2, T Collins 1-1, L Aisling 0-2, L Wall 0-1, A Aisling 0-1.

13 September 2024 Round 3	Cobh	2-10 - 1-06	St James'	Ovens Grounds
	N O’Connell 0-5, D Heelan 1-2 (1-0 penalty, 0-2 f), J Ronan 1-0, A Hastings, A McCarthy, S Cummins 0-1 each.	Report	Joe O’Sullivan 0-4 (0-3f), F Hayes 1-1 (1-0 penalty), A O’Shea 0-1.

13 September 2024 Round 3	Kilmurry	0-09 - 2-08	Canovee	Castle Grounds
	J McGinn (f), L Wall (f), Lloyd Aisling 0-2 each, James O’Mullane, John O’Mullane, B Hinchion 0-1 each.	Report	J Kelleher 1-5 (0-4 f), J Moynihan 1-0 pen, B McNabola, M Healy, D McMahon 0-1 each.

== Group B ==
=== Group B table ===
Semi-finalists Quarter-finalists

Team	Matches				Score			Pts
Team	Pld	W	D	L	For	Against	Diff	Pts
Kinsale	3	3	0	0	48	43	5	6
Glenville	3	1	0	2	41	38	3	2
Ballydesmond	3	1	0	2	42	44	-2	2
Cullen	3	1	0	2	36	42	-6	2

=== Group B results ===
26 July 2024 Round 1	Kinsale	2-13 - 1-15	Ballydesmond	Páirc Eoin Mhic Charthaigh
	B Coughlan 0-6 (0-3 f), J O'Brien 1-3, D Looney 1-0, C O'Leary, J Murphy, N McCarthy, T Broderick 0-1 each.	Report	Donncha O'Connor 0-8 (0-5 f), N Fleming 0-5, B Linehan 1-1, D O'Sullivan 0-1.

27 July 2024 Round 1	Glenville	1-10 - 0-14	Cullen	Páirc Uí Shíocháin
	C O'Leary 1-6, J Cooke 0-2, M O'Driscoll 0-1, E Delahunt 0-1.	Report	L Murphy 0-8, G Twomey 0-3, A Nolan 0-1, C Walsh 0-1, J O'Connor 0-1.

17 August 2024 Round 2	Cullen	0-13 - 2-09	Kinsale	Clondrohid Grounds
	L Murphy 0-8, A Nolan 0-2, A Regan 0-1, C O'Leary 0-1, D Murphy 0-1.	Report	J Murphy 1-2, D Looney 1-1, J O'Brien 0-2, B Coughlan 0-2, B O'Neill 0-1, D Murphy 0-1.

18 August 2024 Round 2	Ballydesmond	1-07 - 2-10	Glenville	Fr Con Buckley Park
	S Kelly 1-0, N Fleming 0-3, N O'Sullivan 0-1, P Breen 0-1, D O'Callaghan 0-1, Donncha O'Connor 0-1.		C O'Leary 1-7, C O'Mahony 1-0, A Collins 0-2, C Fitzgerald 0-1.

13 September 2024 Round 3	Cullen	0-09 - 1-11	Ballydesmond	O'Connell Park
	L Murphy 0-8	Report	Donncha O'Connor 1-8.

21 September 2024 Round 3	Glenville	1-09 - 0-14	Kinsale	Páirc Liam Mhic Cárthaigh
	C O’Leary (1-5, 0-2 Mark, 0-1 free), J Cooke (0-3, 0-2f), C Fitzgerald (0-1).	Report

== Group C ==
=== Group C table ===
Semi-finalists Quarter-finalists Relegation playoff

Team	Matches				Score			Pts
Team	Pld	W	D	L	For	Against	Diff	Pts
Buttevant	3	3	0	0	71	35	36	6
Urhan	3	1	0	2	37	40	-3	2
Millstreet	3	1	0	2	32	52	-20	2
St Nicholas'	3	1	0	3	34	57	-23	2

=== Group C results ===
27 July 2024 Round 1	Urhan	0-11 - 1-07	Millstreet	Inchigeelagh Grounds
	C O'Sullivan 0-3, J O'Neill 0-3, S O'Sullivan 0-2, C Crowley 0-1, A Elphick 0-1, B O'Sullivan 0-1.	Report	H Linehan 0-4, C O'Leary 1-0, J Linehan 0-2, A O'Leary 0-1.

28 July 2024 Round 1	Buttevant	4-18 - 1-06	St Nicholas'	Mill Field
	C Hanlon 2-7 (0-1 f), M Lenahan 2-3, D Hanlon 0-4, P Behan 0-2, B O'Riordan 0-1, K Lenahan 0-1.	Report	G Marshall 1-1, J Corkery 0-2, K McCarthy-Coade 0-1, R Long 0-1, D Coughlan 0-1.

16 August 2024 Round 2	Millstreet	2-05 - 5-10	Buttevant	Castlemagner Grounds
	H Linehan 1-1, P Dineen 1-1, A O'Leary 0-1, C O'Leary 0-1, S Hickey 0-1.		M Lenahan 3-4, C Hanlon 1-2, D Hanlon 0-4, J O'Neill 1-0.

18 August 2024 Round 2	St Nicholas'	1-11 - 1-08	Urhan	St Mary's Park
	J Corkery 1-4.	Report	A Elphick 1-1, J O'Neill 0-3, C Crowley 0-2, S O'Sullivan 0-1.

13 September 2024 Round 3	Urhan	1-12 - 3-07	Buttevant	Ballincollig Grounds
	K O’Sullivan 0-5 (0-2 f), C O’Shea 1-0, L O’Neill 0-3 (0-2 f), C Harrington 0-2 f, S O’Sullivan (f), A Ephic 0-1 each.	Report	D Hanlon 1-3 (1-0 pen, 0-3 f), C Hanlon 1-2, M Lenehan 1-1, N O’Riordan 0-1.

13 September 2024 Round 3	Millstreet	1-13 - 0-11	St Nicholas'	Mourneabbey Grounds
	N Flahive 0-3, J Lenihan 0-3.	Report	D Brosnan 0-3.

== Knockout stage ==
=== Bracket ===
Quarter-Finals
Kilmurry (Muskerry)	4-11
Glenville (Imokilly)	0-04
Canovee (Muskerry)	2-06
Urhan (Beara)	1-06

Semi-Finals
Buttevant (Avondhu)	0-11
Kilmurry (Muskerry)	2-09
Kinsale (Carrigdhoun)	1-09
Canovee (Muskerry)	1-10

Final
Kilmurry (Muskerry)	0-10
Canovee (Muskerry)	1-06

=== Relegation playoff ===
28 September 2024 Playoff	St James'	0-12 - 1-11	St Nicholas'	Páirc Naomh Eoin
	J O’Sullivan (2 f), F Hayes 0-4 each, I Evans 0-2, A O’Shea, D McCarthy 0-1 each.	Report	G Marshall 0-6, E Downey 1-0, J Corkery 0-2 f, D Coughlan, K McCarthy Coade, D Morris (f) 0-1 each.

=== Quarter-finals ===
27 September 2024 Quarter-final	Kilmurry	4-11 - 0-04	Glenville	Ovens Grounds
			C O'Leary 0-2, L Foley 0-2.

28 September 2024 Quarter-final	Canovee	2-06 - 1-06	Urhan	Páirc Tadhg na Samhna
			D Crowley 1-0, B O'Sullivan 0-2, J O'Neill 0-1, C O'Sullivan 0-1, A Elphic 0-1, A O'Neill 0-1.

=== Semi-finals ===
12 October 2024 Semi-final	Buttevant	0-11 - 2-09	Kilmurry	Grenagh Grounds
	M Lenehan (0-6, 2 free); C Hanlon (0-2); J Whelan, D Hanlon (free), M O’Neill (0-1 each).	Report	L Wall (0-4, 2 frees); B Hinchion, K Kelleher (1-0 each); A Asling, Lawrence Asling, Lloyd Asling, P Brehanu, Joe O’Mullane (0-1 each).

12 October 2024 Semi-final	Kinsale	1-09 - 1-10	Canovee	Ballyanley Grounds
		Report	J Kelleher 1-5, C Dodd 0-2, D McMahon 0-2, J Moynihan 0-1.

=== Final ===
25 October 2024 Final	Kilmurry	0-10 - 1-06	Canovee	SuperValu Páirc Uí Chaoimh
	L Wall 0-5 (0-4 f), James O’Mullane 0-2, A Asling, Lawrence Asling, Lloyd Asling, 0-1 each.	Report	J Kelleher 0-3 (0-1 f), C O’Neill 1-0, C Dodd, J Moynihan, M Healy 0-1 each.	Referee: C Murphy (Glanworth)

== Championship statistics ==
=== Top scorers ===
Rank	Player	Club	Tally	Total	Matches	Average
1	Mark Lenahan	Buttevant	6-14	32	4	8.00
2	Jack Kelleher	Canovee	2-24	30	6	5.00
3	Ciarán O'Leary	Glenville	3-20	29	4	7.25
4	Conor Hanlon	Buttevant	4-13	25	4	6.25
5	Liam Wall	Kilmurry	2-18	24	6	4.00

=== Miscellaneous ===
- The Group B round 3 game between Glenville and Kinsale was abandoned after 32 minutes following an injury to one of the Glenville players led to an ambulance being called.
