= 2025 Cork Premier Junior Football Championship =

Annual Gaelic football competition season

- Dates: 25 July - 25 October 2025
- Teams: 12
- Sponsor: McCarthy Insurance Group
- Champions: Buttevant (1st title); Mark Lenahan (captain); Joey O'Hanlon (manager)
- Runners-up: St Nicholas'; Danny Morris (captain); Robert Brosnan (manager)
- Relegated: Ballydesmond

Tournament statistics
- Matches played: 23
- Goals scored: 63 (2.74 per match)
- Points scored: 572 (24.87 per match)
- Top scorer(s): Donncha O'Connor (2-36)

The 2025 Cork Premier Junior Football Championship was the third staging of the Cork Premier Junior Football Championship since its establishment by the Cork County Board in 2023. The draw for the group stage placings took place on 10 December 2024. The championship ran from 25 July to 25 October 2025.

The final was played on 25 October 2025 at SuperValu Páirc Uí Chaoimh in Cork, between Buttevant and St Nicholas', in what was their first ever meeting in the final. Buttevant won the match by 1-15 to 0-10 to claim their first ever championship title in the grade.

Ballydesmond's Donncha O'Connor was the championship's top scorer with 2-36.

== Team changes ==
=== To Championship ===
Relegated from the Cork Intermediate A Football Championship

- Na Piarsaigh

Promoted from the Cork Junior A Football Championship

- Inniscarra

=== From Championship ===
Promoted to the Cork Intermediate A Football Championship

- Kilmurry

Relegated to the City Junior A Football Championship

- St James'

== Group 1 ==
=== Group 1 table ===
Semi-finalist Quarter-finalist Relegation playoff

Team	Matches				Score			Pts
Team	Pld	W	D	L	For	Against	Diff	Pts
St Nicholas'	3	2	1	0	60	43	17	5
Canovee	3	2	0	1	60	44	16	4
Urhan	3	1	0	2	42	62	-20	2
Ballydesmond	3	0	1	2	47	60	-13	1

=== Group 1 results ===
27 July 2025 Round 1	Ballydesmond	0-21 - 4-09	St Nicholas'	O'Connell Memorial Park
	D O'Connor 0-17, N Fleming 0-2, N O'Sullivan 0-1, D O'Connor 0-1.	Report	J O'Sullivan 1-5, J Brosnan 1-1, E O'Leary 1-0, D Wall 1-0, D Morris 0-2, G Marshall 0-1.

27 July 2025 Round 1	Canovee	2-21 - 1-11	Urhan	Sam Maguire Park
	J Kelleher 0-10, A Moynihan 0-5.	Report

23 August 2025 Round 2	Urhan	1-18 - 2-12	Ballydesmond	Páirc Uí Chuana
	C Harrington 0-9, M McCarthy 1-2, A Elphick 0-3, C O’Sullivan 0-3, J O'Neill 0-1.	Report	D O’Connor 1-7, N Fleming 1-3, N O'Sullivan 0-1, P Breen 0-1.

24 August 2025 Round 2	St Nicholas'	2-16 - 0-15	Canovee	Páirc Dhónaill Uí Cheallacháin
	J O'Sullivan 0-8, D Morris 1-2, J Corkery 1-2.	Report	A Moynihan 0-6, J Kelleher 0-3, J Moynihan 0-3, C Dodd 0-3.

12 September 2025 Round 3	Canovee	3-09 - 1-05	Ballydesmond	Castle Grounds
	M Healy 2-2, C O'Neill 1-0, J Kelleher 0-3.	Report	D O'Connor 1-4, N Fleming 0-1.

12 September 2025 Round 3	Urhan	0-07 - 2-11	St Nicholas'	Sam Maguire Park
	C Harrington 0-5.	Report	J O'Sullivan 0-7, D Coughlan 0-3.

== Group 2 ==
=== Group 2 table ===
Quarter-finalist Relegation playoff

Team	Matches				Score			Pts
Team	Pld	W	D	L	For	Against	Diff	Pts
Cullen	3	2	0	1	63	43	20	4
Cobh	3	2	0	1	44	39	5	4
Na Piarsaigh	3	1	0	2	43	60	-17	2
Kinsale	3	1	0	2	41	49	-8	2

=== Group 2 results ===
25 July 2025 Round 1	Cobh	0-13 - 2-18	Cullen	Mourneabbey Grounds
	C Walsh 0-3, C O'Leary 0-3.	Report	L Murphy 0-8, A Nolan 1-2.

26 July 2025 Round 1	Kinsale	2-13 - 2-14	Na Piarsaigh	Ballinora Grounds
	B Coughlan 0-7, M Murphy 2-0, J Murphy 0-2.	Report	A Keating 1-4, K Buckley 0-5, M Sheehan 1-1, S Downey 0-2.

23 August 2025 Round 2	Cullen	1-12 - 0-19	Kinsale	Páirc Abán
	L Murphy 0-8, J O'Connor 1-0, C Walsh 0-1, J Hickey 0-1, C O'Leary 0-1.	Report	M Murphy 0-9, J O'Brien 0-3, N Ryan 0-2, D Looney 0-2, J Murphy 0-2, C O'Callaghan 0-1.

24 August 2025 Round 2	Na Piarsaigh	1-09 - 0-17	Cobh	Caherlag Grounds
	K Buckley 1-2.	Report	D Kearney 0-5, C McLoughlin 0-2, F Duggan 0-2.

12 September 2025 Round 3	Na Piarsaigh	3-02 - 2-18	Cullen	O'Connell Park
	SP Cooke 1-1, C Horgan, S O’Connell Ahern 1-0 each, A Keating 0-1 (f).	Report	L Murphy 1-11 (0-6f, 3 two pointers), C O’Leary 1-3, A Nolan 0-2, J O’Connor, M Twomey 0-1 each.

12 September 2025 Round 3	Kinsale	0-03 - 1-11	Cobh	Ovens Grounds
	M Murphy 0-2 f, G Kearney 0-1.	Report	D Kearney (0-2 f), J Ronan 0-3 each, D Burke 1-0, F Duggan 0-2 (1 2pt), T Wilk, D Heelan (f), M O’Rourke 0-1 each.

== Group 3 ==
=== Group 3 table ===
Semi-finalist Quarter-finalist Relegation playoff

Team	Matches				Score			Pts
Team	Pld	W	D	L	For	Against	Diff	Pts
Buttevant	3	3	0	0	83	45	38	6
Inniscarra	3	2	0	1	67	41	26	4
Glenville	3	0	1	2	39	69	-30	1
Millstreet	3	0	1	2	39	73	-34	1

=== Group 3 results ===
26 July 2025 Round 1	Buttevant	2-17 - 1-12	Glenville	Ballyhooly Grounds
	M Lenehan 0-7, C Hanlon 1-2, D Hanlon 0-5,	Report	C O'Keeffe 1-1, J Cooke 0-3, C O'Leary 0-2, C O'Mahony 0-2.

26 July 2025 Round 1	Inniscarra	2-12 - 0-12	Millstreet	Páirc Eoin Mhic Chárthaigh
	L O'Connor 0-7, S Dornan 1-1, S O'Donoghue 1-1, J O'Dwyer 0-1, D O'Sullivan 0-1, C Lynch 0-1.	Report	D Cashman 0-10, D O'Donovan 0-2.

23 August 2025 Round 2	Glenville	0-08 - 4-18	Inniscarra	Carrignavar Grounds
		Report	S O’Donoghue 2-2, L O’Connor 0-8, M McLoughlin 1-0, F Horgan 1-0.

23 August 2025 Round 2	Millstreet	2-05 - 4-27	Buttevant	Mallow GAA Complex
	D Buckley 1-0, D Cashman 1-0, S Hickey 0-3, P Dineen 0-1, H Lenihan 0-1	Report	C Hanlon 0-12, M Lenehan 1-6, M O’Neill 2-0, D Hanlon 0-6, A Horgan 1-0, K Sheehan 0-2, D Ryan 0-1.

12 September 2025 Round 3	Buttevant	3-12 - 3-10	Inniscarra	Mourneabbey Grounds
	D Hanlon 1-7, M Lenahan 2-2, C Hanlon 0-2, K Crowley 0-1.	Report	L O'Connor 1-4, S Dornan 1-3, S Sheehan 1-0, S Dineen 0-1, F Horgan 0-1, M McLoughlin 0-1.

12 September 2025 Round 3	Glenville	1-13 - 0-16	Millstreet	Páirc Uí Rinn
	C O'Leary 1-4, E Delahunt 0-2, C O'Mahony 0-2, C Fitzgerald 0-1, C Linehan 0-1.	Report	H Linehan 0-5, P Dineen 0-4, S Hickey 0-3, D Cashman 0-3, A O'Leary 0-1.

== Relegation stage ==
=== Relegation playoff ===
27 September 2025 Playoff	Millstreet	1-14 - 0-13	Ballydesmond	Patsy O'Sullivan Memorial Park, Boherbue
	H Linehan (1-2), D Cashman (0-4, 2fs), A O’Leary (f) and D O’Donovan (0-2 each), D Buckley, P Dineen, N Flahive and E O’Sullivan (0-1 each).	Report	Donnacha O’Connor (0-8), B Lenihan (0-3), T Fitzpatrick and P Breen (0-1 each).

== Knockout stage ==
=== Quarter-finals ===
27 September 2025 Quarter-final	Inniscarra	0-14 - 1-12	Cobh	Páirc Eoin Mhic Charthaigh
	S O'Donoghue 0-9.	Report	D Heelan 0-5, E Hastings 1-0, S Kearney 0-3, Adam Lynch 0-2.

27 September 2025 Quarter-final	Cullen	2-08 - 3-16	Canovee	Canovee Grounds
	L Murphy 1-5.	Report	J Kelleher 0-8, A Moynihan 1-3.

=== Semi-finals ===
11 October 2025 Semi-final	Buttevant	2-16 - 0-12	Canovee	O'Connell Memorial Park
	D Hanlon 0-6, M Lenehan 0-6 (2 tp), C Hanlon 1-2, K Lenehan 1-0, M O’Neill, P Behan 0-1 each.	Report	J Kelleher 0-7 (0-5 f, 1 tpf), C Dodd 0-3 (1 tp), M Healy 0-2.

11 October 2025 Semi-final	St Nicholas'	0-14 - 0-12	Cobh	Páirc Séamus de Barra
	J O'Sullivan 0-3 f, D Brosnan 0-3 (1 2pt), J Corkery, Z Lynch (1 2pt) 0-2 each, E O'Leary, E Downey, D Coughlan, S Cummins 0-1 each.	Report	D Kearney 0-3 (1 2pt), D Heelan (0-1 45), J Ronan, M O'Rourke (1 2pt) 0-2 each, D Burke, T Wilk, S Cummins 0-1 each.

=== Final ===
25 October 2025 Final	Buttevant	1-15 - 0-10	St Nicholas'	SuperValu Páirc Uí Chaoimh
	C Hanlon 0-11 (3 2 pt, 0-3 f), M Lenahan 0-3 (1 2pt f), M O’Neill 1-0, D Hanlon 0-1.	Report	J O’Sullivan 0-4 (0-3 f), D Brosnan, D Morris 0-2 each, E Downey, D Dunlea 0-1 each.	Referee: B Crowley (Castlehaven)

== Championship statistics ==
=== Top scorers ===
Rank	Player	Club	Tally	Total	Matches	Average
1	Donncha O'Connor	Ballydesmond	2-36	42	4	10.50
2	Luke Murphy	Cullen	2-32	38	4	9.50
3	Conor Hanlon	Buttevant	2-29	35	5	7.00
4	Mark Lenehan	Buttevant	3-24	33	5	6.60
4	Jack Kelleher	Canovee	0-33	33	5	6.60
6	Jack O'Sullivan	St Nicholas'	1-27	30	5	6.00
7	David Hanlon	Buttevant	1-25	28	5	5.60
8	Liam O'Connor	Inniscarra	1-21	24	4	6.00
9	Seán O'Donoghue	Inniscarra	3-12	21	4	5.25
10	Conchubhar Harrington	Urhan	0-20	20	3	6.66
