= 1992 Cork Junior A Football Championship =

- Dates: 11 October – 6 December 1992
- Teams: 8
- Champions: Urhan (3rd title)
- Runners-up: Midleton

Tournament statistics
- Matches played: 9
- Goals scored: 9 (1 per match)
- Points scored: 155 (17.22 per match)

The 1992 Cork Junior A Football Championship was the 94th staging of the Cork Junior A Football Championship since its establishment by Cork County Board in 1895. The championship ran from 11 October to 6 December 1992.

The final was played at the Ballingeary Grounds, between Urhan and Midleton, in what was their first ever meeting in the final. After two draws and two replays, Urhan won the match by 1–06 to 0–03 to claim their third championship title overall and a first title in 32 years.

== Qualification ==
Division	Championship	Champions
Avondhu	North Cork Junior A Football Championship	Doneraile
Beara	Beara Junior A Football Championship	Urhan
Carbery	South West Junior A Football Championship	Dohenys
Carrigdhoun	South East Junior A Football Championship	Carrigaline
Duhallow	Duhallow Junior A Football Championship	Millstreet
Imokilly	East Cork Junior A Football Championship	Midleton
Muskerry	Mid Cork Junior A Football Championship	Béal Átha'n Ghaorthaidh
Seandún	City Junior A Football Championship	Bishopstown

== Results ==
=== Quarter-finals ===
11 October 1992 Quarter-final	Midleton	1–16 – 0–06	Bishopstown	Douglas Grounds

11 October 1992 Quarter-final	Doneraile	0–08 – 1–04	Dohenys	Millstreet Grounds

18 October 1992 Quarter-final	Urhan	0–15 – 0–08	Millstreet	Kealkill Grounds

18 October 1992 Quarter-final	Carrigaline	0–12 – 0–08	Béal Átha'n Ghaorthaidh	Páirc Naomh Eoin

=== Semi-finals ===
25 October 1992 Semi-final	Midleton	1–10 – 1–08	Doneraile	Páirc Mac Gearailt

25 October 1992 Semi-final	Urhan	0–08 – 0–05	Carrigaline	Aughaville Grounds

=== Final ===
8 November 1992 Final	Urhan	1–10 – 2–07	Midleton	Ballingeary Grounds

22 November 1992 Final replay	Urhan	0–12 – 1–09 (aet)	Midleton	Ballingeary Grounds

6 December 1992 Final 2nd replay	Urhan	1–06 – 0–03	Midleton	Ballingeary Grounds

== Championship statistics ==
=== Miscellaneous ===
- The second final replay between Urhan and Midleton was stopped with the sides level in extra time due to bad light.
