= 1980 Cork Junior Football Championship =

- Dates: 14 September – 30 November 1980
- Teams: 8
- Champions: Kilmurry (3rd title); Seán Murphy (captain)
- Runners-up: Clyda Rovers; Jerry O'Sullivan (captain)

Tournament statistics
- Matches played: 9
- Goals scored: 16 (1.78 per match)
- Points scored: 123 (13.67 per match)
- Top scorer(s): Billy Ahern (1–14)

The 1980 Cork Junior Football Championship was the 82nd staging of the Cork Junior Football Championship since its establishment by Cork County Board in 1895. The championship ran from 14 September to 30 November 1980.

The final was played on 30 November 1980 at Páirc Uí Chaoimh in Cork, between Kilmurry and Clyda Rovers, in what was their first ever meeting in the final. Kilmurry won the match by 1–04 to 0–01 to claim their third championship title overall and a first title in 11 years.

Aghada's Billy Ahern was the championship's top scorer with 1–14.

== Results ==
=== Quarter-finals ===
14 September 1980 Quarter-final	Rockchapel	2-10 - 3-06	Urhan	Inchigeelagh Grounds
	C Guiney 0-5, M Stack 1-0, M O'Rahilly 1-0, G Casey 0-3, A O'Mahony 0-2.		B O'Dwyer 1-3, JJ Murphy 1-0, G Foley 1-0, G Murphy 0-3.

5 October 1980 Quarter-final	Clyda Rovers	2-09 - 1-09	Shamrocks	Ballyanley Grounds
	G Lane 1-3, D Sullivan 1-1, J Sullivan 0-2, N Carey 0-2, T O'Callaghan 0-1.		D O'Neill 1-3, G Hanley 0-2, K Barry 0-1, J Dineen 0-1, L Mulcahy 0-1, D Hurley 0-1.

5 October 1980 Quarter-final	Kilmurry	1-04 - 0-07	Carbery Rangers	Charlie Hurley Park
	D O'Sullivan 1-0, Dan McSweeney 0-2, Doal McSweeney 0-1, G Linehan 0-1.		T Murphy 0-5, M O'Rourke 0-1, N Hayes 0-1.

5 October 1980 Quarter-final	Aghada	2-07 - 2-07	Passage	Páirc Séamus de Barra
	B Ahern 1-6, C Hennessy 1-1.		Ciarán O'Reilly 1-3, Kevin O'Reilly 0-4, P Walsh 1-0.

19 October 1980 Quarter-final replay	Kilmurry	0-08 - 0-06	Carbery Rangers	Charlie Hurley Park
	C Barry-Murphy 0-2, G Linehan 0-2, S Murphy 0-1, R O'Sullivan 0-1, D O'Sullivan 0-1, M Galvin 0-1.		T Murphy 0-4, J Santry 0-1, M O'Rourke 0-1.

19 October 1980 Quarter-final replay	Aghada	1-10 - 0-08	Passage	Páirc Séamus de Barra
	B Ahern 0-7, J Fleming 1-1, B Counihan 0-1, C Hennessy 0-1.		C O'Reilly 0-3, M Shaw 0-2, Kevin O'Reilly 0-1, R Cole 0-1, F O'Gorman 0-1.

=== Semi-finals ===
19 October 1980 Semi-final	Clyda Rovers	1-06 - 0-08	Rockchapel	Banteer Sportsfield
	C O'Callaghan 1-1, G Lane 0-2, D O'Sullivan 0-1, P Curtin 0-1, N Carey 0-1.		D O'Mahony 0-2, J Casey 0-2, S Curtin 0-1, J O'Callaghan 0-1, M Rahilly 0-1, A O'Mahony 0-1.

23 November 1980 Semi-final	Kilmurry	0-07 - 0-06	Aghada	Páirc Uí Chaoimh
	S Murphy 0-3, Dan McSweeney 0-2, J Sullivan 0-2.		J Fleming 0-3, B Aherne 0-1, M Hennessy 0-1, C Hennessy 0-1.

=== Final ===
30 November 1980 Final	Kilmurry	1-04 - 0-01	Clyda Rovers	Páirc Uí Chaoimh
	D O'Sullivan 1-0, Donal McSweeney 0-1, Dan McSweney 0-1, G Linehan 0-1, J O'Sullivan 0-1.		G Lane 0-1 (f).	Referee: E Porter (Brian Dillons)
