= 1931 Cork Junior Football Championship =

Irish Gaelic football competition

- Champions: Urhan (2nd title); P. Sullivan (captain)
- Runners-up: Shamrocks; A. Hourihane (captain)

The 1931 Cork Junior Football Championship was the 33rd staging of the Cork Junior Football Championship since its establishment by the Cork County Board in 1895.

The final was played on 8 November 1931 at the Bantry Grounds, between Urhan and Shamrocks, in what was their first ever meeting in the final. Urhan won the match by 0–06 to 0–02 to claim their second championship title overall and a first title in four years.

== Results ==
=== Final ===
8 November 1931 Final	Urhan	0-06 - 0-02	Shamrocks	Bantry Grounds
