= 1918 Cork Intermediate Football Championship =

Gaelic football competition

- Champions: Millstreet (1st title)
- Runners-up: Knockavilla

The 1918 Cork Intermediate Football Championship was the 10th staging of the Cork Intermediate Football Championship since its establishment by the Cork County Board in 1909.

The final was played between Millstreet and Knockavilla, in what was their first ever meeting in the final. Millstreet won the match by 0–02 to 0–00 to claim their second championship title overall and a first championship title in four years.

== Results ==
=== Final ===
| Final | Millstreet | 0-02 - 0-00 | Knockavilla |
