= 1986 Cork Junior A Football Championship =

- Teams: 8
- Champions: Kilmurry (4th title)
- Runners-up: Valley Rovers

The 1986 Cork Junior A Football Championship was the 88th staging of the Cork Junior A Football Championship since its establishment by Cork County Board in 1895.

The final was played on 9 November 1986 at Charlie Hurley Park in Bandon, between Kilmurry and Valley Rovers, in what was their first ever meeting in the final. Kilmurry won the match by 0–06 to 0–05 to claim their fourth championship title overall and a first title in six years.

== Results ==
=== Final ===
9 November 1986 Final	Kilmurry	0–06 – 0–05	Valley Rovers	Charlie Hurley Park
