= Jim Downing (Gaelic footballer) =

Irish Gaelic footballer (1946–2012)

Personal information
- Native name: Séamus Ó Dúinín (Irish)
- Born: 1946 Urhan, County Cork
- Died: 28 April 2012 (aged 65–66) Urhan, County Cork

Sport
- Sport: Gaelic Football
- Position: Midfield
Clubs
- Years: Club
- Urhan; Beara
Club titles
- Cork titles: 1
- Munster titles: 1
Inter-county*
Years	County	Apps (scores)
1967-1970	Cork	2 (0-00)
Inter-county titles
- Munster titles: 0
- All-Irelands: 0
- NFL: 0
- *Inter County team apps and scores correct as of 16:43, 30 July 2014.

James Downing (1946 - 28 April 2012) was an Irish Gaelic footballer who played as a midfielder for the Cork senior team.

Born in Urhan, County Cork, Downing first played competitive football in his youth. He arrived on the inter-county scene at the age of seventeen when he first linked up with the Cork minor team, before later joining the under-21 and junior sides. He made his senior debut during the 1967 championship. Downing was a regular member of the panel for several years and won one Munster medal as a non-playing substitute. He was All-Ireland runner-up on one occasion.

At club level Downing was a one-time Munster and championship medallist with divisional side Beara. He also won numerous championship medals with Urhan.

Throughout his career Downing made just two championship appearances for Cork. He left the panel after the 1970 championship.

== Honours ==
=== Team ===
Urhan

- Cork Intermediate Football Championship (1): 1967
- Cork Intermediate Football League (1): 1966
- Beara Junior Football Championship (1): 1973
- Kelleher Shield (1): 1961

Beara

- Munster Senior Club Football Championship (1): 1967
- Cork Senior Football Championship (1): 1967

Cork

- Munster Senior Football Championship (1): 1967 (sub)
- Munster Junior Football Championship (1): 1966
- Munster Under-21 Football Championship (1): 1965
- Munster Minor Football Championship (1): 1964
