= 1944 Cork Junior Football Championship =

Irish hurling competition

- Champions: 21st Battalion (1st title)
- Runners-up: Millstreet

The 1944 Cork Junior Football Championship was the 46th staging of the Cork Junior Football Championship since its establishment by the Cork County Board in 1895.

The final was played on 21 January 1945 at the Athletic Grounds in Cork, between 21st Battalion and Millstreet, in what was their first ever meeting in the final. 21st Battalion won the match by 2–06 to 0–03 to claim their first ever championship title.

== Results ==
=== Final ===
21 January 1945 Final	21st Battalion	2–06 – 0–03	Millstreet	Cork Athletic Grounds
