= 1967 Cork Intermediate Football Championship =

Gaelic football competition

- Teams: 13
- Champions: Urhan (1st title)
- Runners-up: Millstreet

The 1967 Cork Intermediate Football Championship was the 32nd staging of the Cork Intermediate Football Championship since its establishment by the Cork County Board in 1909. The draw for the opening round fixtures took place on 29 January 1967.

The final was played on 27 August 1967 at Wolfe Tone Park in Bantry, between Urhan and Millstreet, in what was their first ever meeting in the final. Urhan won the match by 2-15 to 2-06 to claim their first ever championship title.

== Results ==
=== Final ===
27 August 1967 Final	Urhan	2-15 - 2-06	Millstreet	Wolfe Tone Park
