= Bobbie O'Dwyer =

Irish Gaelic footballer and manager

Personal information
- Born: 1959 (age 66–67) Urhan, County Cork, Ireland
- Occupation: Bank manager

Sport
- Sport: Gaelic football
- Position: Right corner-forward
Clubs
- Years: Club
- Urhan; Beara; Parnells
Club titles
- Cork titles: 0
Inter-county
- Years: County
- 1982-1991: London
Inter-county titles
- Munster titles: 2
- All-Irelands: 0
- NFL: 0
- All Stars: 0

Robert O'Dwyer (born 1959) is an Irish Gaelic football selector, manager and former player. At club level he played with Urhan and Parnells and was a member of the London senior football team. O'Dwyer usually lined out as a forward.

== Playing career ==
O'Dwyer began his Gaelic football career at club level with Urhan. After progressing through the juvenile and underage ranks, while also lining out at school's level with St Jarlath's College in Tuam, he eventually joined the club's top adult team and won a Beara Junior Championship title in 1980. By this stage O'Dwyer had already appeared on the inter-county scene, having won a Munster Minor Championship title with Cork in 1977. After emigrating to London, he lined out with the Parnells club, winning several County Championship titles, and spent a decade with the London senior football team.

== Coaching career ==
O'Dwyer's experience as a manager at club level includes periods in charge of O'Donovan Rossa, Urhan, Macroom and Killarney Legion. He first gained inter-county experience with several Cork development squads before being appointed manager of the Cork minor team in 2017. O'Dwyer's three seasons in charge yielded an All-Ireland Championship title in 2019. He later became a selector with the Cork senior football team during Ronan McCarthy's last season in charge in 2021.

== Honours ==
=== Player ===
Urhan

- Beara Junior Football Championship: 1980

Parnells

- London Senior Football Championship: 1981, 1988, 1991

Cork

- Munster Minor Football Championship: 1977

=== Management ===
Cork

- All-Ireland Minor Football Championship: 2019

Sporting positions
Preceded by Brian Herlihy	Cork Minor Football Team Manager; 2017-2020	Succeeded by Michael O'Brien
Preceded by Keith Ricken	Cork Under-20 Football Team Manager; 2021-	Succeeded by Incumbent
Achievements
Preceded by Peter Keane	All-Ireland Minor Football Final winning manager 2019	Succeeded by Martin Boyle
