= 1927 Cork Intermediate Football Championship =

Gaelic football competition

- Champions: Duhallow United (1st title)

The 1927 Cork Intermediate Football Championship was the 18th staging of the Cork Intermediate Football Championship since its establishment by the Cork County Board in 1909.

Duhallow United had qualified for the final, however, Kilmurry and Nemo Rangers, who had played in the second semi-final, were subsequently thrown out of the competition. Duhallow United were declared the champions.
