= Urhan =

Urhan may refer to:

- Urhan (Ireland), a townland on the Beara Peninsula, Ireland
- Chrétien Urhan (1790–1845), viola player
