= 1892 Cork Senior Football Championship =

Gaelic football competition

- Champions: Clondrohid (2nd title)
- Runners-up: Kilmurry

The 1892 Cork Senior Football Championship was the sixth staging of the Cork Senior Football Championship since its establishment by the Cork County Board in 1887.

Clondrohid won the championship following a 1–04 to 0–01 defeat of Kilmurry in the final. This was their second championship title in succession and their second title overall. It remains their last championship success.

== Results ==
=== Final ===
Final	Clondrohid	1-04 - 0-01	Kilmurry
