= 1891 Cork Senior Football Championship =

Gaelic football competition

- Champions: Clondrohid (1st title)
- Runners-up: Nils

The 1891 Cork Senior Football Championship was the fifth staging of the Cork Senior Football Championship since its establishment by the Cork County Board in 1887.

Clondrohid won the championship following a 3–05 to 0–02 defeat of Nils in the final. This was their first ever championship title.

== Results ==
=== Final ===
Final	Clondrohid	3-05 - 0-02	Nils

== Statistics ==
=== Miscellaneous ===
- Clondrohid win the championship for the first time.
- Nils qualify for the final for the first time.
