= 1926 Cork Intermediate Football Championship =

Gaelic football competition

- Dates: 25 April – 31 October 1926
- Teams: 12
- Champions: Buttevant (1st title)
- Runners-up: Kinsale

The 1926 Cork Intermediate Football Championship was the 17th staging of the Cork Intermediate Football Championship since its establishment by the Cork County Board in 1909. The draw for the first round fixtures took place on 10 March 1926. The championship ran from 25 April to 31 October 1926.

The final was played on 31 October 1926 at Turners Cross in Cork, between Buttevant and Kinsale, in what was their first ever meeting in the final. Buttevant won the match by 0–02 to 0–00 to claim their first ever championship title.

== Results ==
=== Final ===
31 October 1926 Final	Buttevant	0-02 - 0-00	Kinsale	Turners Cross
