= 2023 Cork Premier Junior Football Championship =

- Dates: 29 July - 28 October 2023
- Teams: 12
- Sponsor: Bon Secours Hospital
- Champions: St Finbarr's (1st title); Alan McCarthy (captain); Eddie Kelly (manager)
- Runners-up: Kilmurry; William Ronan (captain); Cormac Linehan (manager)
- Relegated: St Michael's

Tournament statistics
- Matches played: 24
- Goals scored: 51 (2.13 per match)
- Points scored: 460 (19.17 per match)
- Top scorer(s): Diarmuid Kearney (3-13)

The 2023 Cork Premier Junior Football Championship was the inaugural staging of the Cork Premier Junior Football Championship. The draw for the group stage placings took place on 11 December 2022. The championship ran from 29 July to 28 October 2023.

The final was played on 28 October 2023 at Páirc Uí Chaoimh in Cork, between St Finbarr's and Kilmurry, in what was their first ever meeting in the final. St Finbarr's won the match by 3-06 to 1-11 to claim their first ever championship title in the grade.

Cobh's Diarmuid Kearney was the championship's top scorer with 3-13.

== Team changes ==
=== To Championship ===
Promoted from the Cork Junior A Football Championship

- Buttevant
- Cobh
- Cullen
- Kilmurry
- Kinsale
- St James'
- St. Michael's
- Urhan

Relegated from the Cork Intermediate A Football Championship

- Ballydesmond
- Millstreet
- St. Finbarr's
- St. Nicholas'

== Participating teams ==
Team	Location	Division	Colours
Ballydesmond	Ballydesmond	Duhallow	Blue and yellow
Buttevant	Buttevant	Avondhu	Black and yellow
Cobh	Cobh	Imokilly	Green and yellow
Cullen	Cullen	Duhallow	Blue and yellow
Kilmurry	Kilmurry	Muskerry	Green and yellow
Kinsale	Kinsale	Carrigdhoun	Blue and white
Millstreet	Millstreet	Duhallow	Green and yellow
St. Finbarr's	Togher	Seandun	Blue and yellow
St. James'	Ardfield	Carbery	Green and yellow
St. Michael's	Blackrock	Seandun	Green and yellow
St. Nicholas'	Blackpool	Seandun	Black and white
Urhan	Urhan	Beara	Red and white

== Group A ==
=== Group A table ===
Knockout stage

Team	Matches				Score			Pts
Team	Pld	W	D	L	For	Against	Diff	Pts
Urhan	3	2	1	0	34	28	6	5
Cullen	3	1	1	1	46	46	0	3
Ballydesmond	3	1	0	2	53	56	-3	2
St. Nicholas'	3	1	0	2	42	45	-3	2

=== Group A results ===
29 July 2023 Round 1	Urhan	0-08 - 0-08	Cullen	Ballingeary Grounds
	C Harrington 0-3f, P O’Shea 0-2, Ciarán O’Sullivan 0-1, B Sullivan 0-1, A O’Sullivan 0-1.	Report	L Murphy 0-4 (0-2f), A Nolan 0-1, G Twomey 0-1, M Twomey 0-1, C Hickey 0-1.

29 July 2023 Round 1	St Nicholas'	1-14 - 1-17	Ballydesmond	O'Connell Park
	D Morris 0-7, D Coughlan 1-2, L Forde 0-2, G Marshall 0-1, R Downey 0-1.	Report	D Moynihan 1-4, Donncha O’Connor 0-6 (0-5f), P Breen 0-3, N Fleming 0-3, M Collins 0-1.

20 August 2023 Round 2	Ballydesmond	1-07 - 1-11	Urhan	Kilmichael Grounds
	D O'Connor 1-1, D Moynihan 0-3, N Fleming 0-2, N O'Sullivan 0-1.		C Harrington 0-7, A Elphick 1-1, M McCarthy 0-1, M O'Shea 0-1, S O'Shea 0-1.

20 August 2023 Round 2	Cullen	1-10 - 2-09	St Nicholas'	Mallow GAA Complex
	L Murphy 1-2, J O'Connor 0-2, A Nolan 0-1, F Cronin 0-1, C Walsh 0-1, C Moynihan 0-1, B O'Connell 0-1, G Twomey 0-1.		D Coughlan 1-2, D Dunlea 1-0, N Goulding 0-2, S O'Callaghan 0-2, G Marshall 0-2, D Morris 0-1.

8 September 2023 Round 3	Ballydesmond	5-08 - 4-13	Cullen	Kiskeam Grounds
	N Fleming 2-1, D O'Connor 0-4, B Linehan 1-0, K O'Connell 1-0, W O'Connor 1-0, S Murphy 0-1, D Moynihan 0-1.		C Walsh 2-2, L Murphy 0-7, J O'Connor 1-2, M Twomey 1-0, A O'Regan 0-1, B O'Connell 0-1.

8 September 2023 Round 3	St Nicholas'	0-10 - 0-12	Urhan	Sam Maguire Park
	N Goulding (f), D Brosnan, D Morris, D Coughlan 0-2 each, D Barry, S O’Callaghan (f) 0-1 each.	Report	A Elphick 0-4, P O’Shea 0-3, J O’Shea 0-2, S O’Shea, C Harrington (f), S O’Sullivan 0-1 each.	Referee: L O'Shea (Carbery Rangers)

== Group B ==
=== Group B table ===
Knockout stage Relegation playoff

Team	Matches				Score			Pts
Team	Pld	W	D	L	For	Against	Diff	Pts
St. Finbarr's	3	2	0	1	44	36	8	4
Cobh	3	2	0	1	41	36	5	4
Buttevant	3	1	0	2	38	42	-4	2
St. Michael's	3	0	0	3	35	44	-9	0

=== Group B results ===
30 July 2023 Round 1	Buttevant	0-13 - 1-08	St Michael's	O'Connell Park
	M Lenahan 0-6, D Hanlon 0-4 (1f), M O'Neill 0-2, K Lenahan 0-1.	Report	E Buckley 1-1, P Cronin 0-2, D O'Sullivan 0-1, D Cremin 0-1, F Leahy 0-1, B Cain 0-1, T Grainger 0-1.

30 July 2023 Round 1	St. Finbarr's	1-09 - 1-08	Cobh	Caherlag Grounds
	R McInerney 0-5, E McGreevey 1-0.		N O'Connell 1-2, D Kearney 0-4.

20 August 2023 Round 2	Cobh	1-10 - 1-09	Buttevant	Mill Field
	N O'Connell 1-2, D Heelan 0-2, D Kearney 0-2, M O'Rourke 0-1, T Wilk 0-1, E Hastings 0-1, A Hastings 0-1.		M Lenahan 1-4, M O'Neill 0-2, S Madigan 0-2, D O'Hanlon 0-1.

20 August 2023 Round 2	St Michael's	3-03 - 2-08	St Finbarr's	Páirc Uí Rinn
			A Lyne 1-0, D O'Brien 1-0.

8 September 2023 Round 3	Cobh	2-11 - 1-09	St Michael's	Caherlag Grounds
	D Kearney 2-6.

8 September 2023 Round 3	St Finbarr's	3-09 - 1-10	Buttevant	O'Connell Park
	E McGreevey 1-1, A Lyne 1-0, S Fenton 1-0, M Shields 0-3f, A Murphy 0-2f, D O'Brien 0-1f, A Barry 0-1, C Madden 0-1.	Report	M O'Neill 0-5 (0-4f), D Hanlon 1-1, M Lenahan 0-3f, C O'Toole 0-1.	Referee: S Stokes (Tullylease)

== Group C ==
=== Group C table ===
Knockout stage Relegation playoff

Team	Matches				Score			Pts
Team	Pld	W	D	L	For	Against	Diff	Pts
Kilmurry	3	3	0	0	54	26	28	6
Millstreet	3	2	0	1	44	48	-4	4
St. James'	3	1	0	2	30	48	-18	2
Kinsale	3	0	0	3	39	45	-6	0

=== Group C results ===
29 July 2023 Round 1	Kinsale	0-13 - 1-11	St. James'	Our Lady's Well Grounds
	J O'Brien 0-6, M Murphy 0-3, G Finn 0-2, C Sheehan 0-2.		F Hayes 1-3, I Evans 0-3, J O'Driscoll 0-2, P O'Sullivan 0-2, J O'Sullivan 0-1.	Referee: J Horgan (Gleann na Laoi)

29 July 2023 Round 1	Millstreet	0-10 - 1-19	Kilmurry	Páirc Abán
	J Buckley 0-6f, H Linehan 0-2, A O’Leary 0-1; D Cashman 0-1.	Report	J McGinn 0-6 (0-3f), L Aisling 0-4, D Cahalane 1-0, J O’Mullane 0-3, P Brehanu 0-2, S Warren 0-2 (0-1f), K Kelleher 0-1; B Hinchion 0-1.

19 August 2023 Round 2	Kilmurry	1-09 - 0-09	Kinsale	Ballincollig Grounds
	L Aisling 1-0, L Wall 0-3, S Warren 0-2, T Collins 0-2, J McGinn 0-1, J O'Mullane 0-1.

20 August 2023 Round 2	St. James'	1-06 - 0-15	Millstreet	Kilmurry Grounds
	F Hayes 1-2, A O'Shea 0-1, A Hayes 0-1, J O'Sullivan 0-1, C Hayes 0-1.		S Hickey 0-4, M Vaughan 0-2, H Linehan 0-2, A O'Leary 0-2, D Cashman 0-2, C O'Leary 0-1, A Murphy 0-1, N Flahive 0-1.

8 September 2023 Round 3	Millstreet	1-16 - 2-11	Kinsale	Cloughduv Grounds
	J Linehan 0-5, A O’Leary 1-2, H Linehan 0-4 (0-1f), A Murphy, D Cashman, K Crowley, C O’Leary, M Vaughan 0-1 each.	Report	B Coughlan 1-8 (0-8f), J O’Brien 1-1, M Murphy, J Murphy 0-1 each.	Referee: M O'Leary (Diarmuid Ó Mathúna's)

8 September 2023 Round 3	Kilmurry	3-11 - 0-07	St James'	Páirc Uinsinn
	P Berhanu 1-2, J McGinn 1-0, W Ronan 1-0, L Wall 0-3, S Warren 0-3, J O'Mullane 0-2, K Kelleher 0-1.		J O'Sullivan 0-4, F Hayes 0-2, C Hayes 0-1.

== Knockout stage ==
=== Bracket ===
Quarter-Finals
Urhan	0-10
Millstreet	1-05
Cullen	0-06
Cobh	1-06

Semi-Finals
Kilmurry	0-12
Urhan	1-07
St Finbarr's	0-10
Cobh	0-08

Final
Kilmurry	1-11
St Finbarr's	3-06

=== Relegation playoff ===
24 September 2023 Playoff	Kinsale	1-11 - 0-09	St Michael's	Páirc Liam Mhic Cárthaigh
	J Murphy 1-3, B Coughlan 0-5 f, M Murphy 0-2, D Looney 0-1.	Report	C Cronin 0-6 f, B Cain 0-2 (0-1 f), S Ahern 0-1.	Referee: P O'Leary (Cloughduv)

=== Quarter-finals ===
23 September 2023 Quarter-final	Cullen	0-06 - 1-06	Cobh	Páirc Eoin Mhic Cárthaigh
	L Murphy 0-3 (0-2 f), A Regan 0-2, C Walsh 0-1.	Report	D Kearney 1-1 (0-1 45), D Heelan 0-2 f, N O'Connell (f), C Spriggs A McCarthy 0-1 each.	Referee: C Nolan (BIshopstown)

23 September 2023 Quarter-final	Urhan	0-10 - 1-05	Millstreet	St Colum's Grounds
	A Elphick 0-3, Conchubar Harrington, Vincent Lehane 0-2 f each, B Sullivan, C Lowney (m), P O’Shea 0-1each.	Report	H Linehan 1-2 (0-2 f), J Linehan, C O’Leary, E O’Mahony 0-1 each.	Referee: T Barry (Bantry Blues)

=== Semi-finals ===
6 October 2023 Semi-final	Kilmurry	0-12 - 1-07	Cobh	Páirc Uí Rinn
	S Warren 0-5 (0-2 f), J Ryan 0-4 (0-1 f), L Wall, J O’Mullane, P Brehanu 0-1 each.	Report	J Hamilton 1-0, N O’Connell, E Hastings 0-2 each, D Heelan (f), A Hastings, S Cummins 0-1 each.	Referee: C Walsh (Nemo Rangers)

7 October 2023 Semi-final	St Finbarr's	0-10 - 0-08	Urhan	Rossmore Grounds
	D O’Brien 0-3, A Murphy (0-1 f), M Shields 0-2 each, A McCarthy, E Comyns, C Madden 0-1 each.	Report	C Harrington 0-3, P O’Shea, V Lehane 0-2 each, A Elphick 0-1.	Referee: N Hayes (Carbery Rangers)

=== Final ===
28 October 2023 Final	Kilmurry	1-11 - 3-06	St Finbarr's	Páirc Uí Chaoimh
	L Wall 0-5, S Warren 1-2 (0-1 f), J Ryan 0-2 (0-1 f), P Berhanu, T Collins 0-1 each.	Report	C Doolan, C Madden, A Murphy 1-0 each, D O’Brien 0-2 (0-1 f), O Murphy, A McCarthy, M Shields, C Walsh 0-1 each.	Referee: J Murphy (Castletownroche)
