= Seán Murphy (Cork Gaelic footballer) =

Irish Gaelic footballer

Personal information
- Native name: Seán Ó Murchú (Irish)
- Born: 1953 (age 72–73) Kilmurry, County Cork, Ireland
- Occupation: Solicitor

Sport
- Sport: Gaelic football
- Position: Right wing-forward
Clubs
- Years: Club
- Kilmurry → Muskerry
Club titles
- Cork titles: 0
College
- Years: College
- University College Cork
College titles
- Sigerson titles: 0
Inter-county
Years	County	Apps (scores)
1974-1981	Cork	10 (0-16)
Inter-county titles
- Munster titles: 0
- All-Irelands: 0
- NFL: 1
- All Stars: 0

Seán Murphy (born 1953) is an Irish retired Gaelic footballer, coach and selector who played for Cork Championship club Kilmurry and at inter-county level with the Cork senior football team. He usually lined out at wing-forward.

== Playing career ==
Murphy first came to notice at juvenile and underage levels with the Kilmurry club. He eventually progressed to the adult team and won Cork JFC titles in 1980 and 1986, as well as numerous divisional and league titles. He also lined out with University College Cork in the Sigerson Cup and earned selection to the Muskerry team. Murphy first appeared on the inter-county scene with the Cork minor football team and was at wing-forward on the team that lost the 1971 All-Ireland minor final to Mayo.

He later lined out with the under-21 team. Murphy joined the Cork senior football team's extended panel during their Munster Championship-winning season in 1974, however, he didn't break onto the team until 1976. He was a member of the team that won the 1979–80 National League title before leaving the panel in 1981.

== Management career ==
Murphy was only 25 years-old when he became player-manager with Kilmurry in 1978. During his three years in charge the club secured two Mid Cork JAFC titles and the Cork JFC title. He returned as player-manager again in 1984 and the club repeated the previous feat by winning two Mid Cork titles and the Cork JFC title. Murphy became a Cork senior football team selector in October 1987 and remained in that role until June 1991.

During his tenure the team won two consecutive All-Ireland SFC titles from three consecutive final appearances, as well as a National League title. Murphy later coached the Erin's Own club to their very first Cork JFC title in 1994. He later returned as a selector with Kilmurry and also had a second spell as a selector with the Cork senior football team.

== Honours ==
=== Player ===
Kilmurry

- Cork Junior A Football Championship: 1980, 1986
- Mid Cork Junior A Football Championship: 1978, 1980, 1984, 1986

Cork

- National Football League: 1979–80
- Munster Under-21 Football Championship: 1974
- Munster Minor Football Championship: 1971

=== Management ===
Kilmurry

- Cork Junior A Football Championship: 1980, 1986
- Mid Cork Junior A Football Championship: 1978, 1980, 1984, 1986

Erin's Own

- Cork Junior A Football Championship: 1994
- East Cork Junior A Football Championship: 1994

Cork

- All-Ireland Senior Football Championship: 1989, 1990
- Munster Senior Football Championship: 1988, 1989, 1990
- National Football League: 1988–89
