= 1927 Cork Junior Football Championship =

Irish Gaelic football competition

- Champions: Urhan (1st title)
- Runners-up: Newmarket

The 1927 Cork Junior Football Championship was the 29th staging of the Cork Junior Football Championship since its establishment by the Cork County Board in 1895.

The final was played on 4 March 1928 at the Killarney Grounds, between Urhan and Newmarket, in what was their first ever meeting in the final. Urhan won the match by 2–03 to 1–00 to claim their first ever championship title.

== Results ==
=== Final ===
4 March 1928 Final	Urhan	2-03 - 1-00	Newmarket	Killarney Grounds
