= 1963 Cork Junior Football Championship =

- Dates: 22 September – 1 December 1963
- Teams: 9
- Champions: Millstreet (2nd title)
- Runners-up: St Nicholas'

Tournament statistics
- Matches played: 8
- Goals scored: 28 (3.5 per match)
- Points scored: 102 (12.75 per match)

The 1963 Cork Junior Football Championship was the 65th staging of the Cork Junior A Football Championship since its establishment by Cork County Board in 1895. The championship ran from 22 September to 2 December 1963.

The final was played on 1 December 1963 at the Castle Grounds in Macroom, between Millstreet and St Nicholas', in what was their first ever meeting in the final. Millstreet won the match by 3–07 to 2–08 to claim their second championship title overall and a first title in 22 years.

== Qualification ==
Division	Championship	Representatives
Avondhu	North Cork Junior A Football Championship	Glanworth
Beara	Beara Junior A Football Championship	Castletownbere
Carbery	South West Junior A Football Championship	O'Donovan Rossa
Carrigdhoun	South East Junior A Football Championship	Crosshaven
Duhallow	Duhallow Junior A Football Championship	Millstreet
Imokilly	East Cork Junior A Football Championship	Glanmire
Muskerry	Mid Cork Junior A Football Championship	Béal Átha'n Ghaorthaidh; Kilmichael
Seandún	City Junior A Football Championship	St Nicholas'

== Results ==
=== Quarter-finals ===
22 September 1963 Quarter-final	St Nicholas'	2–03 – 0–06	Glanworth	Páirc Mac Gearailt

6 October 1963 Quarter-final	Glanmire	Declared void	Castletownbere	Wolfe Tone Park

6 October 1963 Quarter-final	Crosshaven	1–03 – 0–06	Béal Átha'n Ghaorthaidh	Charlie Hurley Park

13 October 1963 Quarter-final replay	Glanmire	3–04 – 1–09	Castletownbere	Sam Maguire Park

13 October 1963 Quarter-final	Millstreet	2–11 – 2–09	O'Donovan Rossa	Sam Maguire Park

20 October 1963 Quarter-final replay	Crosshaven	2–10 – 3–05	Kilmichael	Charlie Hurley Park

=== Semi-finals ===
27 October 1963 Semi-final	St Nicholas'	2–05 – 2–02	Glanmire	Cork Athletic Grounds

27 October 1963 Semi-final	Millstreet	2–09 – 1–05	Crosshaven	Cork Athletic Grounds

=== Final ===
1 December 1963 Final	Millstreet	3–07 – 2–08	St Nicholas'	Castle Grounds

== Championship statistics ==
=== Miscellaneous ===
- The quarter-final between Glanmire and Castletownbere was abandoned after a pitch invasion and declared void.
- Béal Átha'n Ghaorthaidh were the Muskerry representatives for the quarter-final draw with Crosshaven, however, their place was later taken by Kilmichael who beat them in the divisional final.
- The final, originally scheduled for 24 November 1963, was postponed by a week following the assassination of John F. Kennedy two days earlier.
