= Cork Premier Junior Football Championship =

Gaelic football competition in Cork, Ireland

- Current season or competition: 2026 Cork Premier Junior Football Championship
- Code: Gaelic football
- Founded: 2023; 3 years ago
- Region: Cork (GAA)
- Trophy: Donal Hurley Cup
- No. of teams: 12
- Title holders: Canovee (1st title)
- Sponsors: McCarthy Insurance Group
- Official website: Official website

The Cork Premier Junior Football Championship (known for sponsorship reasons as the McCarthy Insurance Group Cork Premier Junior Football Championship and abbreviated to the Cork PJFC) is an annual Gaelic football competition organised by the Cork County Board of the Gaelic Athletic Association and contested by the top-ranking junior clubs in the county of Cork in Ireland. It is the fifth tier overall in the entire Cork football championship system.

The Cork Premier Junior Championship was introduced in 2023 following a restructuring of the various intermediate and junior championships.

In its current format, the Cork Premier Junior Championship begins in early autumn. The 12 participating club teams are divided into three groups of four teams and play each other in a round-robin system. The three group winners and the three runners-up proceed to the knockout phase that culminates with the final match at Páirc Uí Chaoimh. The winner of the Cork Premier Junior Championship qualifies for the subsequent Munster Club Championship.

Canovee are the title holders after defeating Cobh by 0-10 to 0-09 in the 2026 final.

== History ==
A restructuring process of the entire Cork football championship system had been underway since voted on by Cork County Board delegates in March 2019. In February 2022, the County Board took a further vote on the future of the club junior and intermediate championships. Delegates voted in favour of creating the Premier Junior Championship, comprising teams formed by the bottom four teams in Intermediate A football in 2022 along with the eight Divisional JAFC winners from 2022.

== Format ==
=== Group stage ===
The 12 teams are divided into three groups of four. Over the course of the group stage, each team plays once against the others in the group, resulting in each team being guaranteed at least three games. Two points are awarded for a win, one for a draw and zero for a loss. The teams are ranked in the group stage table by points gained, then scoring difference and then their head-to-head record. The top two teams in each group qualify for the knockout stage.

=== Knockout stage ===
Quarter-finals: Two lone quarter-finals featuring the four lowest-placed qualifying teams from the group stage. Two teams qualify for the next round.

Semi-finals: The two quarter-final winners and the top two highest-placed qualifying teams from the group stage contest this round. The two winners from these games advance to the final.

Final: The two semi-final winners contest the final. The winning team are declared champions.

=== Promotion and relegation ===
At the end of the championship, the winning team is automatically promoted to the Cork Intermediate A Championship for the following season. The two worst-ranked teams from the group stage take part in a playoff, with the losing team being relegated to the Cork Junior A Football Championship into their respective divisional championship.

== Teams ==
=== 2027 Teams ===
The 12 teams due to compete in the 2027 Cork Premier Junior Football Championship are:

Team	Location	Division	Colours	Position in 2026	In Championship since	Championship Titles (JAFC)	Last Championship Title (JAFC)
Cobh	Cobh	Imokilly	Green and yellow	Runners-up	2023	2	1908
Cullen	Cullen	Duhallow	Blue and yellow	Group stage	2023	0	—
Glanworth	Glanworth	Avondhu	Green and white	Intermediate A relegated	2027	3	2009
Glenville	Glenville	Imokilly	Black and gold	Group stage	2024	1	1995
Inniscarra	Inniscarra	Muskerry	Blue and white	Semi-finals	2025	1	2024
Kilmacabea	Leap	Carbery	Green and gold	Group stage	2026	1	2025
Kinsale	Kinsale	Carrigdhoun	Blue and white	Quarter-finals	2023	2	1932
Millstreet	Millstreet	Duhallow	Green and yellow	Quarter-finals	2023	3	2014
St. Nicholas'	Blackpool	Seandún	Black and white	Semi-finals	2023	0	—
St Vincent's	Knocknaheeny	Seandún	Green and white	Group stage	2026	1	1946
Urhan	Urhan	Beara	Red and white	Group stage	2023	4	1992
Barryroe / Douglas	TBD	TBD	TBD	Junior A champions	2027	TBD	2026

== Sponsorship ==
In keeping with all championships in the Cork football system, Bon Secours Hospital became the title sponsor of the Cork Premier Junior Championship in 2023. McCarthy Insurance Group became the new title sponsor in December 2023.

== Qualification for subsequent competitions ==
The Cork Premier Junior Football Championship winners qualify for the subsequent Munster Junior Club Football Championship.

== Trophy and medals ==
The Donal Hurley Cup is the current prize for winning the championship. It was donated in November 2022 to honour Donal Hurley who served as a St Finbarr's player, selector and administrator. Alan McCarthy of St Finbarr's was the first recipient of the cup when it was presented to him after the 2023 final.

Traditionally, at Páirc Uí Chaoimh, the victory presentation takes place at a special rostrum in the main grandstand. The cup is decorated with ribbons in the colours of the winning team. During the game the cup actually has both teams' sets of ribbons attached and the runners-up ribbons are removed before the presentation. The winning captain accepts the cup on behalf of his team before giving a short speech. Individual members of the winning team then have an opportunity to come to the rostrum to lift the cup, which is held by the winning team until the following year's final.

In accordance with GAA rules, the County Board awards a set of gold medals to the championship winners. The medals depict a stylised version of the Cork GAA crest.

== Roll of honour ==
=== By club ===
#	Team	Titles	Runners-up	Championships won	Championships runner-up
1	Kilmurry	1	1	2024	2023
1	St Finbarr's	1	0	2023	—
3	Canovee	0	1	—	2024

=== By Division ===
Division	Titles	Runners-Up	Total
Muskerry	1	2	3
Seandun	1	0	1
Avondhu	0	0	0
Beara	0	0	0
Carbery	0	0	0
Carrigdhoun	0	0	0
Duhallow	0	0	0
Imokilly	0	0	0

== List of finals ==
=== List of Cork PJFC finals ===
Year	Winners		Runners-up		Winning captain(s)	Venue	#
Year	Club	Score	Club	Score	Winning captain(s)	Venue	#
2026	Canovee	0–10	Cobh	0–09	Evan Dodd and Liam Kelleher	SuperValu Páirc Uí Chaoimh	
2025	Buttevant	1–15	St. Nicholas'	0–10	Mark Lenahan	SuperValu Páirc Uí Chaoimh	
2024	Kilmurry	0–10	Canovee	1–06	William Ronan	SuperValu Páirc Uí Chaoimh	
2023	St Finbarr's	3–06	Kilmurry	1–11	Alan McCarthy	Páirc Uí Chaoimh	

== See also ==
- Cork Intermediate A Football Championship
- Cork Junior A Football Championship
