= Mark Ellis (hurler) =

Irish hurler (born 1990)

Personal information
- Native name: Marc Eilís (Irish)
- Born: 26 August 1990 (age 36) Kilmacanogue, County Wicklow, Ireland
- Occupation: Electrical engineer
- Height: 6 ft 4 in (193 cm)

Sport
- Sport: Hurling
- Position: Centre back
Clubs
- Years: Club
- Millstreet → Duhallow
Club titles
| | Football | Hurling |
| Cork titles | 0 | 0 |
College
- Years: College
- 2012-2016: Cork Institute of Technology
College titles
- Fitzgibbon titles: 0
Inter-county*
| Years | County | Apps (scores) |
| 2011-2019 | Cork; New York | 25 (0-04) |
Inter-county titles
- Munster titles: 2
- All-Irelands: 0
- NHL: 0
- All Stars: 0
- *Inter County team apps and scores correct as of 11:19, 15 July 2019.

Mark Ellis (born 26 August 1990) is an Irish hurler who plays as a centre-back for Duhallow Championship club Millstreet. He is a former member of the Cork senior hurling team.

== Playing career ==
=== Millstreet Community School ===
While attending Millstreet Community School Ellis was selected for the Cork vocational schools hurling team. On 16 February 2008, he was named as a substitute for the All-Ireland final against Galway but was introduced during the game which Cork won by 2–14 to 3–10 victory.

On 14 February 2009, Ellis was again included as a substitute on the Cork team that qualified for the All-Ireland final against Offaly. He remained on the bench for the entire game which Cork won by 4–12 to 2–11.

=== Millstreet ===
Ellis joined the Millstreet club at a young age and played in all grades at juvenile and underage levels in an area that was more noted as a Gaelic football stronghold.

On 31 August 2014, Ellis won a Duhallow Junior Championship medal with the Millstreet junior football team following a 2–13 to 1–11 defeat of Knocknagree in the final. Millstreet progressed through the subsequent Cork Junior Championship and reached the final on 25 October. Ellis lined out at midfield in the 1–09 to 1–08 defeat of St Finbarr's in the final.

=== Duhallow ===
Ellis was selected for the Duhallow divisional team that competed at county level in the underage hurling grades. On 14 December 2009, he won a Cork Under-21 Championship medal following Duhallow's 0–18 to 1–05 defeat of Ballinhassig in the final.

=== Cork ===
==== Under-21 ====
Ellis first played for Cork as a member of the under-21 team during the 2010 Munster Championship. He was an unused substitute throughout the championship campaign, which ended with a 2–17 to 0–21 defeat by Tipperary at the semi-final stage on 14 July.

Ellis made his under-21 debut on 15 July 2011. He lined out at left wing-back in the 4–19 to 1–21 defeat of Tipperary. Ellis retained his position on the starting fifteen for the subsequent 4–20 to 1–27 defeat by Limerick in the Munster final. It was his last game in the grade.

==== Intermediate ====
Ellis was added to the Cork intermediate team for the 2010 Munster Championship. He made his first appearance on 20 June when he came on as a 44th-minute substitute for Stephen White in a 1–24 to 3–17 defeat of Limerick. On 22 July, Ellis was at left wing-back when Cork defeated Waterford by 0–15 to 0–13 to win the Munster Championship. He retained his position on the starting fifteen for Cork's subsequent 2–17 to 1-13 All-Ireland final defeat by Kilkenny on 28 August.

Ellis was retained on the Cork intermediate team for the 2011 Munster Championship. He was switched to centre-back, however, Cork's championship campaign ended on 19 June following a 2–19 to 0–15 defeat by Clare.

On 20 July 2013, Ellis made his last appearance for the Cork intermediate team. He was at right wing-back when Cork suffered a 0–19 to 0–18 defeat by Tipperary in the Munster Championship final.

==== Senior ====
Ellis made his first appearance for the Cork senior team on 23 January 2011. He was at centre-back for Cork's 3–17 to 1–22 defeat of University College Cork in the pre-season Waterford Crystal Cup. Ellis was retained on the Cork panel for the subsequent National League and made his first appearance on 13 February in a 1–20 to 1–15 defeat of Offaly. An injury ruled him out of inclusion on Cork's panel for the Championship, while a change of management saw him dropped from the panel for the 2012 season.

Ellis returned to the Cork senior panel for the 2013 season. On 8 September, he was an unused substitute when Cork drew with Clare in the All-Ireland final. Ellis was again included on the panel for the replay on 28 September but failed to make an appearance in the 5–16 to 3–16 defeat.

On 25 May 2014, Ellis made his championship debut in a 1-21 apiece draw with Waterford in the Munster Championship quarter-final. On 3 July, he won a Munster Championship medal when he lined out at centre-back in Cork's 2–24 to 0–24 defeat of Limerick in the last final to be played at the old Páirc Uí Chaoimh. Ellis ended the season by being nominated for an All-Star.

On 3 May 2015, Ellis was at centre-back in Cork's 1–24 to 0–17 defeat by Waterford in the National League final.

Ellis won his second Munster Championship medal on 9 July 2017. He was again at centre-back for the 1–25 to 1–20 defeat of Clare in the final.

On 2 June 2018, Ellis suffered a groin injury during the Munster Championship draw with Limerick. The injury resulted in him missing the rest of Cork's successful Munster Championship campaign. Ellis returned to training in July and came on as a substitute for Daniel Kearney when Cork suffered a 3–32 to 2-21 extra-time defeat by Limerick in the All-Ireland semi-final on 29 July.

== Career statistics ==
| Team | Year | National League | | | Munster | | All-Ireland | | Total | |
| Team | Year | Division | Apps | Score | Apps | Score | Apps | Score | Apps | Score |
|---|---|---|---|---|---|---|---|---|---|---|
| Cork | 2011 | Division 1 | 2 | 0-00 | — | | — | | 2 | 0-00 |
| Cork | 2012 | Division 1A | — | | — | | — | | — | |
| Cork | 2013 | Division 1A | 0 | 0-00 | 0 | 0-00 | 0 | 0-00 | 0 | 0-00 |
| Cork | 2014 | Division 1B | 2 | 0-00 | 4 | 0-00 | 1 | 0-00 | 7 | 0-00 |
| Cork | 2015 | Division 1A | 6 | 0-01 | 1 | 0-01 | 3 | 0-00 | 10 | 0-02 |
| Cork | 2016 | Division 1A | 2 | 0-00 | 1 | 0-00 | 2 | 0-00 | 5 | 0-00 |
| Cork | 2017 | Division 1A | 6 | 0-00 | 3 | 0-01 | 1 | 0-00 | 10 | 0-01 |
| Cork | 2018 | Division 1A | 4 | 0-03 | 3 | 0-02 | 1 | 0-00 | 8 | 0-05 |
| Cork | 2019 | Division 1A | — | | 3 | 0-00 | 2 | 0-00 | 5 | 0-00 |
| Career total | | | 22 | 0-04 | 15 | 0-04 | 10 | 0-00 | 47 | 0-08 |

== Honours ==
Millstreet

- Cork Junior Football Championship (1): 2014
- Duhallow Junior A Football Championship (1): 2014

Duhallow

- Cork Under-21 Hurling Championship (1): 2009

Cork

- Munster Senior Hurling Championship (2): 2014, 2017
- Munster Senior Hurling League (1): 2017
- Munster Intermediate Hurling Championship (1): 2010
- All-Ireland Vocational Schools Hurling Championship (1): 2008, 2009
