= 1960 Cork Junior Football Championship =

- Dates: 9 October – 20 November 1960
- Teams: 8
- Champions: Urhan (1st title)
- Runners-up: Mitchelstown

Tournament statistics
- Matches played: 7
- Goals scored: 17 (2.43 per match)
- Points scored: 79 (11.29 per match)

The 1960 Cork Junior Football Championship was the 62nd staging of the Cork Junior A Football Championship since its establishment by Cork County Board in 1895. The championship ran from 9 October to 20 November 1960.

The final was played on 20 November 1960 at Sam Maguire Park in Dunmanway, between Urhan and Mitchelstown, in what was their first ever meeting in the final. Urhan won the match by 1–07 to 0–04 to claim their third championship title overall and a first title in 31 years.

== Qualification ==
Division	Championship	Representatives
Avondhu	North Cork Junior A Football Championship	Mitchelstown
Beara	Beara Junior A Football Championship	Urhan
Carbery	South West Junior A Football Championship	Bandon
Carrigdhoun	South East Junior A Football Championship	Kinsale
Duhallow	Duhallow Junior A Football Championship	Castlemagner
Imokilly	East Cork Junior A Football Championship	Cobh
Muskerry	Mid Cork Junior A Football Championship	Kilmichael
Seandún	City Junior A Football Championship	St Finbarr's

== Results ==
=== Quarter-finals ===
9 October 1960 Quarter-final	Urhan	2–05 – 1–05	Castlemagner	Ballingeary Grounds

9 October 1960 Quarter-final	Cobh	1–02 – 1–00	Kinsale	Manning Park

16 October 1960 Quarter-final	Mitchelstown	1–09 – 2–04	Kilmichael	Caherlag Grounds

16 October 1960 Quarter-final	Kilmichael	4–09 – 1–07	Bandon	Ballinhassig Griunds

=== Semi-finals ===
23 October 1960 Semi-final	Urhan	1–07 – 0–04	Cobh	Sam Maguire Park

6 November 1960 Semi-final	Mitchelstown	2–07 – 0–09	St Finbarr's	Páirc Mac Gearailt

=== Final ===
20 November 1960 Final	Urhan	1–07 – 0–04	Mitchelstown	Sam Maguire Park
