= 1941 Cork Junior Football Championship =

Irish hurling competition

- Champions: Millstreet (1st title)
- Runners-up: Bere Island

The 1941 Cork Junior Football Championship was the 43rd staging of the Cork Junior Football Championship since its establishment by the Cork County Board in 1895.

The final was played on 7 December 1941 at the Fr Breen Memorial Park in Kenmare, in what remains the only final to be played outside the county. Millstreet faced Bere Island, in what was their first ever meeting in the final. Millstreet won the match by 1–02 to 0–03 to claim their first ever championship title.

== Results ==
=== Final ===
7 December 1941 Final	Millstreet	1–02 – 0–03	Bere Island	Fr Breen Memorial Park
