= 1969 Cork Junior Football Championship =

- Teams: 8
- Champions: Kilmurry (2nd title)

Tournament statistics
- Matches played: 7
- Goals scored: 15 (2.14 per match)
- Points scored: 93 (13.29 per match)

The 1969 Cork Junior Football Championship was the 71st staging of the Cork Junior A Football Championship since its establishment by Cork County Board in 1895.

No final was actually played, as Kilmurry were awarded the title after Midleton were thrown out of the competition following an objection from defeated semi-finalists Bantry Blues. It was Kilmurry's second championship title overall and a first title in 45 years.

== Qualification ==
Division	Championship	Representatives
Avondhu	North Cork Junior A Football Championship	Mitchelstown
Beara	Beara Junior A Football Championship	Castletownbere
Carbery	South West Junior A Football Championship	Bantry Blues
Carrigdhoun	South East Junior A Football Championship	Carrigaline
Duhallow	Duhallow Junior A Football Championship	Newmarket
Imokilly	East Cork Junior A Football Championship	Midleton
Muskerry	Mid Cork Junior A Football Championship	Kilmurry
Seandún	City Junior A Football Championship	Passage

== Results ==
=== Quarter-finals ===
Quarter-final	Kilmurry	1–04 – 0–03	Castletownbere

Quarter-final	Midleton	3–07 – 1–06	Carrigaline

Quarter-final	Bantry Blues	3–05 – 1–10	Mitchelstown

Quarter-final	Newmarket	0–14 – 3–05	Passage

Quarter-final replay	Newmarket	0–07 – 0–05	Passage

=== Semi-finals ===
Semi-final	Kilmurry	1–09 – 0–09	Newmarket

Semi-final	Midleton	2–06 – 0–03	Bantry Blues

=== Final ===
Final	Kilmurry	awarded title
