= 1914 Cork Intermediate Football Championship =

Gaelic football competition

- Champions: Millstreet (1st title)
- Runners-up: O'Donovan Rossa

The 1914 Cork Intermediate Football Championship was the sixth staging of the Cork Intermediate Football Championship since its establishment by the Cork County Board in 1909.

The final was played between Millstreet and O'Donovan Rossa, in what was their first ever meeting in the final. Millstreet won the match by 1–03 to 0–00 to claim their first ever championship title.

== Results ==
=== Final ===
Final	Millstreet	1-03 - 0-00	O'Donovan Rossa
