= 1933 Cork Intermediate Football Championship =

Gaelic football competition

- Champions: Kilmurry (1st title)
- Runners-up: Bantry Blues

The 1933 Cork Intermediate Football Championship was the 24th staging of the Cork Intermediate Football Championship since its establishment by the Cork County Board in 1909.

The final was played on 24 September 1933 at the Athletic Grounds in Dunmanway, between Kilmurry and Bantry Blues, in what was their first ever meeting in the final. Kilmurry won the match by 2–03 to 0–06 to claim their first ever championship title.

== Results ==
=== Final ===
24 September 1933 Final	Kilmurry	2-03 - 0-06	Bantry Blues	Dunmanway Athletic Grounds
