= 2019 All-Ireland Minor Football Championship =

Gaelic football competition

All-Ireland Minor Football Championship 2019
Championship details
- Dates: 10 April – 1 September 2019
- Teams: 32

All-Ireland Champions
- Winning team: Cork (11th win)
- Captain: Conor Corbett
- Manager: Bobbie O'Dwyer

All-Ireland Finalists
- Losing team: Galway
- Captain: Jonathan McGrath
- Manager: Dónal Ó Fátharta

Provincial Champions
- Munster: Kerry
- Leinster: Dublin
- Ulster: Monaghan
- Connacht: Mayo

Championship statistics
- No. matches played: 68
- Top Scorer: Tomo Culhane
- Player of the Year: Conor Corbett

The 2019 All-Ireland Minor Football Championship was the GAA's premier inter-county Gaelic football competition for under seventeens. Thirty-two county teams from Ireland competed.

2018 was the first minor competition for under 17-year-olds – previously the competition had an under eighteen age limit. The under seventeen championship with a new format was introduced after a vote at the GAA Congress on 26 February 2016.

A league format is followed in Connacht and Leinster. Munster introduced a double league format in 2019 with the winners of an initial Phase 1 league containing weaker teams advancing to a Phase 2 league where they play in a 3-team league with Cork and Kerry. Ulster still plays a knockout championship.

The winners will receive the Tom Markham Cup.

== Teams ==
Thirty-two teams from Ireland contested the championship. New York and London did not participate in this competition.

== Competition format ==
Provincial Championships

Connacht, Leinster, Munster and Ulster each organised provincial championship. Each province decided its own rules for determining their champions. The formats for the 2019 provincial championships are explained in the sections below.

All-Ireland

The four provincial winners play the four provincial runners-up in the All-Ireland quarterfinals. Two semi-finals and a final follow. All matches are played in a single knockout format. The minor final is normally played before the All-Ireland senior final.

== Provincial championships ==
=== Connacht Minor Football Championship ===
==== Connacht Format ====
All five Connacht counties compete in a single round robin format. The top three teams in the round robin table meet again in the Connacht semi-final and final.

The winners receive the Tom Kilcoyne Cup.

==== Connacht Table ====
Pos	Team	Pld	W	D	L	PF	PA	PD	Pts	Qualification
1	Galway	4	3	0	1	90	51	+39	6	Contest Connacht final and advance to All-Ireland quarter finals
2	Sligo	4	3	0	1	74	58	+16	6	Contest Connacht semi-final, winner advances to Connacht final and All-Ireland quarter finals
3	Mayo	4	2	0	2	72	45	+27	4	Contest Connacht semi-final, winner advances to Connacht final and All-Ireland quarter finals
4	Roscommon	4	2	0	2	74	73	+1	4	
5	Leitrim	4	0	0	4	33	116	−83	0	

Updated to match(es) played on unknown. Source:
Rules for classification: 1) League points; 2) Where only two teams are involved, the outcome of the meeting of the two teams in the competition; 3) Scoring difference; 4) Highest total score for; 5) A play-off.

==== Connacht League Section Rounds 1 to 5 ====
17 May 2019 Round 1	Leitrim	0-06 - 1-20	Mayo	Ballinamore, County Leitrim
		Report

17 May 2019 Round 1	Roscommon	1-17 - 1-15	Galway	Dr Hyde Park, Roscommon
		Report

24 May 2019 Round 2	Galway	0-15 -1-10	Sligo	Tuam Stadium, Tuam

24 May 2019 Round 2	Mayo	4-14 - 0-05	Roscommon	James Stephens Park Ballina, County Mayo

31 May 2019 Round 3	Roscommon	5-15 - 0-08	Leitrim	Dr Hyde Park, Roscommon

31 May 2019 Round 3	Sligo	0-16 - 0-12	Mayo	Markievicz Park, Sligo

14 June 2019 Round 4	Mayo	0-11 - 2-12	Galway	MacHale Park, Castlebar
				Referee: Brendan Healy Roscommon

14 June 2019 Round 4	Leitrim	1-09 - 1-21	Sligo	Páirc Seán Mac Diarmada, Carrick-on-Shannon

21 June 2019 Round 5	Galway	5-24 - 1-04	Leitrim	Tuam Stadium, Tuam

21 June 2019 Round 5	Sligo	2-15 - 4-07	Roscommon	Markievicz Park, Sligo

==== Connacht Semi Final ====
26 June 2019
19:30 IST (UTC+1)
Final

Sligo	1-10 (13) – (22) 5-7	Mayo

MacHale Park, Mayo

==== Connacht Final ====
5 July 2019
19:30 IST (UTC+1)
Final

Galway	1-17 (20) – (21) 1-18	Mayo

Tuam Stadium, Galway
Referee: Patrick McTiernan (Roscommon)

=== Leinster Minor Football Championship ===
==== Leinster Format ====
Leinster teams competed in 3 groups, each of 4 teams. Each team in a group plays a single match against the other teams. The first two teams in each group progress to the Leinster semi-finals.

==== Leinster Group 1 table ====
Pos	Team	Pld	W	D	L	PF	PA	PD	Pts	Qualification
1	Laois	2	1	1	0	25	25	0	3	Advance to Leinster Semi-Final
2	Westmeath	2	1	0	1	28	23	+5	2	
3	Longford	2	1	0	1	19	23	−4	2	
4	Carlow	2	0	1	1	20	22	−2	1	

Updated to match(es) played on unknown. Source:
Rules for classification: 1) League points; 2) Where only two teams are involved, the outcome of the meeting of the two teams in the competition; 3) Scoring difference; 4) Highest total score for; 5) A play-off.

===== Leinster Group 1 Rounds 1 to 3 =====
April 2019 Round 1	v

April 2019 Round 1	v

April 2019 Round 2	v

April 2019 Round 2	v

April 2019 Round 3	v

April 2019 Round 3	v

==== Leinster Group 2 table ====
Pos	Team	Pld	W	D	L	PF	PA	PD	Pts	Qualification
1	Dublin	2	2	0	0	43	29	+14	4	Advance to Leinster Quarter-Final
2	Meath	2	1	0	1	24	27	−3	2	
3	Offaly	2	1	0	1	18	20	−2	2	
4	Wexford	0	0	0	0	25	34	−9	0	

Updated to match(es) played on unknown. Source:
Rules for classification: 1) League points; 2) Where only two teams are involved, the outcome of the meeting of the two teams in the competition; 3) Scoring difference; 4) Highest total score for; 5) A play-off.

===== Leinster Group 2 Rounds 1 to 3 =====
April 2019 Round 1	v

April 2019 Round 1	Dublin	4-10 - 2-10	Meath	Parnell Park, Dublin
	R O’Dwyer 1-2, F Murray 0-4 (0-3f), S Kinsella, L Swan 1-1 each, R Bolger 1-0, A Rogers, D O’Dowd 0-1.	[https://www.dublingaa.ie/news/minor-footballers-finish-strong-to-edge-out-meath	D Bell 1-1, N Finnerty 0-3, A Chinchilla 1-0, P Sheridan, E Frayne (0-2f), B Thompson (0-2f) 0-2 each.	Referee: A Coyne (Westmeath).

April 2019 Round 2	v

April 2019 Round 2	Dublin	3-12 - 1-10	Wexford	Bellefield, Enniscorthy.
	F Murray 2-6 (0-6f), R Bolger 1-3, D Fagan, S Kinsella, L Curran 0-1 each.	Report	J O'Leary 0-4 (0-2f, 0-1 '45'), J Curtis 1-1, L Whelan 0-3 (0-1f), R O'Connor, R Connolly 0-1 each.	Referee: K Harris (Kildare).

April 2019 Round 3	v

April 2019 Round 3	Dublin	2-13 - 0-13	Offaly	O'Connor Park, Tullamore
	R Bolger 1-3, F Murray 1-1 (0-1 ‘45’), L Swan 0-3, C Monaghan 0-2, D O’Dowd, S Kinsella, D Fagan, R Keogh 0-1 each	[https://www.dublingaa.ie/news/minor-footballers-progress-to-leinster-quarter-finals-1	C Delaney 0-6 (0-4f, 0-1 ’45’), M Tynan 0-4 (0-3f), D Flynn 0-2, J Sheerin 0-1.	Referee: N Ward (Westmeath)

==== Leinster Group 3 table ====
Pos	Team	Pld	W	D	L	PF	PA	PD	Pts	Qualification
1	Kildare	2	2	0	0	40	0	+40	4	Advance to Leinster Semi-Final
2	Wicklow	2	1	0	1	0	28	−28	2	
3	Louth	2	1	0	1	41	38	+3	2	
4	Kilkenny	2	0	0	2	26	72	−46	0	

Updated to match(es) played on unknown. Source:
Rules for classification: 1) League points; 2) Where only two teams are involved, the outcome of the meeting of the two teams in the competition; 3) Scoring difference; 4) Highest total score for; 5) A play-off.

===== Leinster Group 3 Rounds 1 to 3 =====
8 May 2019 Round 1	Louth	v	Kildare	Ardee

May 2019 Round 1	v

May 2019 Round 2	v

May 2019 Round 2	v

May 2019 Round 3	v

May 2019 Round 3	v

==== Leinster Quarter-Finals ====
1 June 2018; 15:00; Quarter-Final 1	Wicklow	1-9 - 0-20	Dublin	Joule Park, Aughrim; Referee: Seamus Mulhare (Laois)
1 June 2018; 15:00; Quarter-Final 1	Shane Daly 0-4, Joe Prendergast 1-1, Matthew Ging 0-3 (0-2f), Tom Keogh 0-1	Report	Fionn Murray 0-6 (0-3f, 1 '45), Alex Rogers 0-4, Ryan O'Dwyer 0-3 (0-2f), Luke Curran 0-2, Luke Murphy-Guinane, Sean Kinsella, Robbie Bolger, Luke Swan, Ross Keogh 0-1 each	Joule Park, Aughrim; Referee: Seamus Mulhare (Laois)

1 June 2018; 16:00; Quarter-Final 2	Westmeath	2-15 - 1-14 AET	Meath	Cusack Park (Mullingar); Referee: David Fedigan (Louth); Man of the Match: Fionn O'Hara (St. Loman's Mullingar)
1 June 2018; 16:00; Quarter-Final 2	Ben McGauran 0-6 (0-3f), Fionn O'Hara 1-2, Shane Reid 1-1, Luke Buckley 0-3 (0-1f), Eamonn Martin, Dan Leech, Cillian Lawlor 0-1 each	Report	Eoghan Frayne 0-9 (0-6f, 1 '45), Niall Finnerty 1-3 (0-2f), Josh Carolan and Barry Thompson 0-1 each	Cusack Park (Mullingar); Referee: David Fedigan (Louth); Man of the Match: Fionn O'Hara (St. Loman's Mullingar)

==== Leinster Semi-Finals ====
21 June 2019; 20:00; Semi-Final 1	Laois	1-6 - 0-12	Kildare	O'Moore Park; Referee: David Fedigan (Louth)
21 June 2019; 20:00; Semi-Final 1	Oisin Hooney 1-0, Conor Goode and Brian Whelan (0-2f) 0-2 each, Sean Greene and Colin Dunne 0-1 each	Report	Eoin Bagnall 0-8 (0-7f), Aaron Browne 0-2, Shane Flynn and Oisin Milmoe 0-1 each	O'Moore Park; Referee: David Fedigan (Louth)

22 June 2019; 15:45; Semi-Final 2	Westmeath	1-11 - 0-18	Dublin	Cusack Park; Referee: David Hickey (Carlow); Man of the Match: Ross Keogh (St. Sylvesters)
22 June 2019; 15:45; Semi-Final 2	Ben McGauran 1-4, Fionn O'Hara and Dan Leech 0-2 each, Luke Buckley (1 '45), Devin Hill, Shane Reid 0-1 each	Report	Fionn Murray 0-6 (0-3f, 1 '45), Alex Rogers 0-4, Ross Keogh 0-3, Senan Forker, Conor Archer, Ryan O'Dwyer (0-1f), Robbie Bolger, Luke Murphy-Guinane 0-1 each	Cusack Park; Referee: David Hickey (Carlow); Man of the Match: Ross Keogh (St. Sylvesters)

==== Leinster Final ====
6 July 2019; 14:00; Final	Kildare	2-21 - 1-19 AET	Dublin	Páirc Tailteann, Navan; Referee: David Hickey (Carlow); Man of the Match: Aaron Browne (Celbridge)
6 July 2019; 14:00; Final	Eoin Bagnall 1-7 (0-6f), Aaron Browne 1-7, Shane Flynn 0-3, Eoin Meehan 0-2, Kevin Eustace and Mikey Delahunty 0-1 each	Report	Fionn Murray 0-10 (0-8f, 1 '45), Luke Swan 1-1, Ryan O'Dwyer 0-4 (0-2f, 0-1 pen), Luke Curran 0-2, Alex Rogers and Ross Keogh 0-1 each	Páirc Tailteann, Navan; Referee: David Hickey (Carlow); Man of the Match: Aaron Browne (Celbridge)

=== Munster Minor Football Championship ===
==== Munster Format ====
The four weakest Munster teams compete in a league known as Phase 1.

The winner of Phase 1 competes in a further league known as Phase 2

==== Munster Phase 1 League Rounds 1 to 4 ====
10 April 2019 Round 1	Clare	3-15 - 1-10	Limerick	Newcastlewest, Limerick
		Report		Referee: Brendan Griffin Kerry

Phase 1 Round 1 Clare 3-15 Limerick 0-10 10/4 Newcastlewest Brendan Griffin (Kerry)

Phase 1 Round 1 Tipperary 4-13 Waterford 0-7 10/4 Sean Treacy Park Tipperary Town John Ryan (Cork)

Phase 1 Round 2 Clare 1-10 Tipperary 0-6 17/4 Cusack Park Ennis Seamus Mulvihill (Kerry)

Phase 1 Round 2 Waterford 1-7 Limerick 0-10 17/4 Fraher Field Dungarvan Sean Lonergan (Tipperary)

Phase 1 Round 3 Tipperary 0-10 Limerick 0-10 24/4 Sean Treacy Park Tipperary Town Chris Maguire (Clare)

Phase 1 Round 3 Waterford 2-7 Clare 1-9 24/4 Fraher Field Dungarvan Jonathan Hayes (Limerick)

Phase 1 Final Clare 3-12 Tipperary 0-6 8/5 LIT Gaelic Grounds Sean Joy (Kerry)

Team Played Won Drawn Lost Scores For Scores Against Score Difference Points

Clare 3 2 0 1 5-34 (49) 2-23 (29) +20 4

Tipperary 3 1 1 1 4-29 (41) 1-27 (30) +11 3

Waterford 3 1 1 1 3-21 (30) 5-32 (47) -17 3

Limerick 3 0 2 1 0-30 (30) 4-32 (44) -14 2

==== Munster Phase 2 ====
Phase 2 Round 1 Kerry 3-19 Cork 1-9 7/5 Páirc Uí Rinn Alan Kissane (Waterford)

Phase 2 Round 2 Cork 3-9 Clare 0-14 15/5 Cusack Park Ennis Brendan Griffin (Kerry)

Phase 2 Round 3 Kerry 1-16 Clare 0-11 23/5 Austin Stack Park Tralee Donnacha O’Callaghan (Limerick)

2019 Munster Minor Football Championship Table Phase 2

Team Played Won Drawn Lost Scores For Scores Against Score Difference Points

Kerry 2 2 0 0 4-35 (47) 1-20 (23) +24 4

Cork 2 1 0 1 4-18 (30) 3-33 (42) -12 2

Clare 2 0 0 2 0-25 (25) 4-25 (37) -12 0

==== Munster Final ====
22 June 2019
18:00 IST (UTC+1)
Final

Report

Kerry	3-14 (23) – (20) 2-14	Cork

Páirc Uí Chaoimh, Cork
Referee: Seán Lonergan (Tipperary)

=== Ulster Minor Football Championship ===
For official fixtures and results see Ulster Minor Football Championship at ulstergaa.ie

==== Ulster Format ====
In 2018 the Ulster Championship changed to a double-elimination format, which replaced the straight knockout style of previous years. Every team who lost a match before the semi-finals re-entered the competition via the Qualifiers Round 1 (R1), Qualifiers Round 2 (R2) or Qualifiers Round 3 (R3). This ensured that all teams played at least two games. The semi-finals and final were knockout.

The winners received the Father Murray Cup.

=== Ulster Direct Route ===
==== Ulster Preliminary Round ====
Two of the nine teams were drawn to play in the preliminary round.

v

==== Ulster Round 1 ====
The seven teams who avoided the preliminary round plus the winners of the preliminary round competed in four matches in round 1.

v

v

v

v

==== Ulster Round 2 ====
The four winning teams from round 1 met in two matches.

v

v

=== Ulster Qualifier Route ===
==== Ulster Qualifiers R1 ====
Two of the five teams beaten in the preliminary round or round 1 met in a playoff match. The losing team was eliminated from the competition.

v

==== Ulster Qualifiers R2 ====
The four remaining teams who lost only one match in the preliminary round or round 1 met in two matches with the two losing teams being eliminated,

v

v

==== Ulster Qualifiers R3 ====
The two losing teams from round 2 (who lost only one match) met the two winning teams from the qualifiers R2. The two losing teams were eliminated from the competition.

v

v

==== Ulster Knockout Stage ====
===== Ulster Semi-Finals =====
The two winning teams from round 2 met the two winning teams from the qualifiers R3. The two losing teams were eliminated from the competition.

21 June 2019 Semi-Final	Derry	0-10 (10) – (17) 1-14	Tyrone	Armagh
20:00 IST (UTC+1)				Venue: Athletic Grounds
				Referee: Sean Laverty (Antrim)

21 June 2019 Semi-Final	Monaghan	5-10 (25) – (17) 2-11	Donegal	Enniskillen
20:00 IST (UTC+1)				Venue: Brewster Park
				Referee: James Lewis (Fermanagh)

===== Ulster Final =====
14 July 2019
16:00 IST (UTC+1)
Final

Report

Monaghan	1-13 (16) – (14) 1-11	Tyrone
(HT: 0-09 – 0-08)
Gls: M Hamill; Pts: D Dempsey (5, 1f, 1 '45), J Irwin (2), M Hamill, S Slevin, E Duffy, K Gallagher, K Connolly, D Marron		Gls: M McGleenan; Pts: L Donnelly (4, 2f), M Devlin (3, 1 '45), D Fullerton, C Daly, S O'Donnell, M McGleenan

Athletic Grounds, Armagh
Referee: Dan Mullan (Derry)

== All-Ireland ==
For official fixtures and results see All Ireland Minor Football Championship @ gaa.ie

=== All-Ireland Draw ===
Quarter-finals

Semi-finals

Final

Mayo
5-12 (27)

Dublin
2-19 (25)

Mayo
1-13 (16)

Cork
4-12 (24)

Monaghan
2-10 (16)

Cork
3-19 (28)

Galway
0-00 (00)

Cork
0-00 (00)

Kildare
0-15 (15)

Galway
2-17 (23)

Galway
0-14 (14)

Kerry
0-13 (13)

Kerry
1-12 (15)

Tyrone
0-09 (09)

=== Quarter-finals ===
27 July 2019 Quarter-final	Mayo	5-12 - 2-19	Dublin	Pearse Park, Longford
	F Irwin 0-5 (0-3f), R Keane, E Henry (1 '45), C Mylett 1-1 each, P Walsh and R Morrin 1-0 each, D Thornton 0-3, J Grady 0-1	Report	F Murray 0-10 (0-5f, 2 '45), A Rogers 1-3, L Curran 1-2 (0-1f), C Walsh, D Fagan, L Swan, R Keogh 0-1 each	Referee: P Faloon (Down)

27 July 2019 Quarter-final	Galway	2-17 - 0-15	Kildare	Pearse Park, Longford
	E Bagnall (0-4f) and A Browne 0-5 each, A Conneely 0-2, PJ Cullen, A Boyle, C O’Brie 0-1 each	Report	T Culhane 0-6 (0-5f), N Grainger 1-2, J McLaughlin 1-1, D Cox 0-3, E Nolan and W Seoige 0-2 each, N Cunningham 0-1	Referee: S Lonergan (Tipperary)

28 July 2019 Quarter-final	Kerry	1-12 - 0-09	Tyrone	O'Connor Park, Tullamore
	J O’Connor 0-5 (2 ’45, 1f), E O’Shea 1-2, D Geaney 0-3, E O’Sullivan 0-1, R O’Grady 0-1.	Report	M Devlin 0-4 (2’45), L Donnelly 0-3 (1f), D Fullerton 0-1, S Browne 0-1.	Referee: B Tiernan (Dublin)

28 July 2019 Quarter-final	Cork	3-19 - 2-10	Monaghan	O'Connor Park, Tullamore
	P Campbell 1-5 (0-5f), M O’Neill 1-3 (0-2f), C Corbett 1-3 (0-2f), R O’Donovan 0-3 (0-1f), D Linehan 0-2, D Cashman 0-1, K Scannell 0-1, A Walsh Murphy 0-1.	Report	L McDonald 2-0 (2-0 pen), D Dempsey 0-4, J Irwin 0-3 (2f), D Marron 0-1, E Duffy 0-1, A Brennan 0-1.	Referee: L Devenney (Mayo)

=== Semi-finals ===
10 August 2019 Semi-final	Mayo	1-13 - 4-12	Cork	Croke Park, Dublin
	C Corbett 2-3, P Campbell 1-2, D Linehan 1-0, R O’Donovan, H Murphy, M O’Neill (0-1f) 0-2 each, J Cahalane 0-1.	Report	P Heneghan 0-4, E Henry 0-3 (0-3f), N Feeney 1-0, F Irwin 0-2, S Dempsey, C Mylett (0-1f), J Grady (0-1f), O McHale 0-1 each.	Referee: N Cullen (Fermanagh)

11 August 2019 Semi-final	Galway	0-14 - 0-13	Kerry	Croke Park, Dublin
	T Culhane 0-6 (0-4f), W Seoige and D Brady 0-2 each, N Grainger, C Hernon, D Cox and D Kennedy 0-1 each.	Report	D Lynch, D Geaney and E O’Shea 0-3 each, J O’Connor 0-2, S O’Brien and C Crowley 0-1 each.	Referee: M McNally (Monaghan)

=== Final ===
1 September 2019 Final	Cork	3-20 - 3-14 (aet)	Galway	Croke Park, Dublin
	C Corbett 1-7, M O’Neill 0-6 (3fs), R O’Donovan 1-2, J Cahalane 1-1, D Cashman 0-2, P Campbell and L Murphy 0-1 each.	Report	T Culhane 0-10 (7fs), N Cunningham 2-0, D Cox 1-2, N Grainger 0-2.	Referee: N Mooney (Cavan)

== See also ==
- 2019 All-Ireland Senior Football Championship
- 2019 All-Ireland Under-20 Football Championship
