= Clondrohid GAA =

Gaelic Athletic Association in County Cork, Ireland

Clondrohid
- Cluain Droichead
- Founded: 1882
- County: Cork
- Colours: Blue and white
- Grounds: Clondrohid

Playing kits
Standard colours

Senior Club Championships
	All Ireland	Munster champions	Cork champions
Football:	0	0	2

Clondrohid GAA is a Gaelic Athletic Association club located outside Clondrohid, County Cork, Ireland. The club is solely concerned with the game of Gaelic football.

== Honours ==
- Cork Senior Football Championship (2): 1891, 1892
- Mid Cork Junior A Football Championship (1): 1995
- Duhallow Junior A Football Championship (2): 1940, 1942
