= Urhan GAA =

Gaelic football club, County Cork, Ireland

Urhan
- Oircheann
- Founded: 1927
- County: Cork
- Colours: Red and white
- Grounds: Páirc na hAoraí

Playing kits
Standard colours

Senior Club Championships
	All Ireland	Munster champions	Cork champions
Football:	0	0	0

Urhan GAA is a Gaelic Athletic Association club located in the townland of Urhan in County Cork, Ireland. The club, situated in the Beara Peninsula, is exclusively concerned with the game of Gaelic football.

== History ==
Located in the townland of Urhan in the Beara Peninsula, Urhan GAA Club was founded in 1927 following the establishment of the Beara Board. The club has spent most of its existence operating in the Beara JAFC, winning 28 titles from 44 final appearances and leading the division's all-time roll of honour. Four of these divisional titles were subsequently converted into Cork JAFC titles. The club achieved senior status for the first time after their 2-15 to 2-06 defeat of Millstreet in the 1967 Cork IFC final.

== Honours ==
- Cork Intermediate Football Championship (1): 1967
- Cork Junior A Football Championship (4): 1927, 1931, 1960, 1992
- Beara Junior A Football Championship (28): 1927, 1931, 1933, 1934, 1943, 1944, 1950, 1955, 1956, 1957, 1958, 1959, 1973, 1980, 1982, 1983, 1987, 1988, 1990, 1991, 1992, 2007, 2008, 2010, 2011, 2012, 2015, 2019

== Notable players ==
- Jim Downing: Munster SFC-winner (1967)
- Nealie Duggan: Munster SFC-winner (1943, 1945, 1949, 1956, 1957)
- Bobbie O'Dwyer: All-Ireland MFC-winning manager (2019)
- Ciarán O'Sullivan: Munster SFC-winner (1993, 1994, 1995, 1999, 2002)
- Con O'Sullivan: Munster SFC-winner (1966, 1967)
