= Buttevant GAA =

Gaelic games club in County Cork, Ireland

Buttevant
- Cill na Mullach
- Founded: 1886
- County: Cork
- Nickname: The Bumble Bees
- Colours
- Grounds: Fr Con Buckley Park

Playing kits
Standard colours

Senior Club Championships
	All Ireland	Munster champions	Cork champions
Football:	0	0	0
Hurling:	0	0	0

Buttevant GAA is a Gaelic Athletic Association club in Buttevant, County Cork, Ireland. The club is affiliated to the North Cork Board and fields teams in both hurling and Gaelic football.

== History ==
Located in the town of Buttevant in North Cork, Buttevant GAA Club was established in the early years of the Gaelic Athletic Association. Originally known as Buttevant Brigadiers, the new club played, what is recognised as its first hurling match under GAA rules, on 26 May 1886 against nearby Ballyhea.

Buttevant has spent the majority of its existence operating in the lower grades. The club had its first major success when, in 1926, the Cork IFC title was won after a defeat of Kinsale in the final. This was followed by a Cork IHC title success in 1940. Buttevant subsequently slipped down through the various grades and was operating at junior level by the turn of the century. North Cork titles in both codes were won between 2010 and 2022, before Buttevant won the Cork Premier JFC title atter a 1–15 to 0–10 defeat of St Nick's in 2025.

== Grounds ==
Buttevant's home ground is Fr Con Buckley Memorial Park. Built on the site of the former British Army barracks and used since 1922, it is named in honour of a local priest who, as well as being in attendance at the inaugural meeting of the GAA in Hayes' Hotel in November 1884, was the driving force behind the club in its early years. The official renaming and opening took place on 21 April 1963.

== Honours ==
The club's major honours are outlined below:

- Cork Intermediate Hurling Championship (1): 1940
- Cork Intermediate Football Championship (1): 1926
- Cork Premier Junior Football Championship (1): 2025
- North Cork Junior A Hurling Championship (1): 2010
- North Cork Junior A Football Championship (2): 2017, 2022
- Cork Junior B Hurling Championship (2): 1996, 2024
- North Cork Junior B1 Hurling Championship (1): 2024
- North Cork Premier Minor Football Championship (1): 1978
- North Cork Premier Minor Hurling Championship (1): 1983
- North Cork Premier Minor hurling Championship (1): 1984
- North Cork Minor A Football Championship (3): 2013, 2015, 2020
- Cork County Minor A Football Championship (1): 2015
- Cork County Minor Premier 2 Football Championship (1): 2016

== Notable players ==
- Tommy O'Sullivan: All-Ireland SHC-winner (1953, 1954)
- Batt Thornhill: All-Ireland SHC-winner (1941, 1942, 1943, 1944)
