= Urhan (Ireland) =

Townland on the Beara Peninsula, Ireland

Coordinates: 51°40′17″N 10°00′10″W

Urhan or Urhin (Irish: Iorthan) is a townland in Ireland on the Beara Peninsula. The townland lies between Slieve Miskish and Coulagh Bay, along the coastal road between Allihies and Eyeries. It contains one pub, The Urhan Inn, and a national school. Urhan is also located along both the Ring of Beara and the Wild Atlantic Way.
