= Kilmurry GAA =

Gaelic football club in County Cork, Ireland

Kilmurry
- Cill Mhuire
- Founded: 1875
- County: Cork
- Colours
- Grounds: Jack Fitzgerald Memorial Park

Playing kits
Standard colours

Senior Club Championships
	All Ireland	Munster champions	Cork champions
Football:	0	0	0

Kilmurry GAA is a Gaelic Athletic Association club located in Kilmurry, County Cork, Ireland. The club is affiliated to the Muskerry Board and the Cork County Board. Kilmurry GAA Club is solely concerned with Gaelic football and is a sister club of Cloughduv Hurling Club and St Val's Ladies' Gaelic Football Club.

== History ==
Located in the village of Kilmurry, about 20 miles west of Cork, Kilmurry Gaelic Football Club was founded in 1875. It is one of the oldest clubs still in existence and its establishment predates the Gaelic Athletic Association by almost a decade. Kilmurry fielded a team in the early years of the Cork SFC and were beaten by Clondrohid in the 1892 final. The club later struggled to field a team and amalgamated with Canovee in the early years of the 20th century.

Kilmurry had its first notable success when, in 1924, the club won the Cork JFC title, following a 1–02 to 0–02 defeat of Nils. A Cork IFC success followed in 1933, with Kilmurry returning to the senior ranks. The club returned to the junior ranks in the decades that followed, however, Kilmurry had furth Cork JFC title successes in 1969, 1980 and 1986.

The 21st century brought further junior successes. A 1–12 to 0–08 win over Cobh in 2022 secured a fifth Cork JAFC title. Kilmurry won the Cork Premier JFC title two years later, following a 0–10 to 1–06 win over parish rivals Canovee in the final.

== Honours ==
- Cork Intermediate A Football Championship (2): 1933, 2026
- Cork Premier Junior Football Championship (1): 2024
- Cork Junior A Football Championship (5): 1924, 1969, 1980, 1986, 2022
- Mid Cork Junior A Football Championship (11): 1931, 1969, 1978, 1980, 1984, 1986, 2012, 2014, 2016, 2017, 2022
- Mid Cork Under-21 A Football Championship (1): 2018
- Cork Minor Football Championship (1): 1939
- Cork Minor B Football Championship (2): 2006, 2009
