= Millstreet GAA =

Gaelic games club in County Cork, Ireland

Millstreet
- Sráid an Mhuilinn
- Founded: 1888
- County: Cork
- Nickname: The Sráid
- Colours
- Grounds: Millstreet Town Park
- Coordinates: 52°03′38.70″N 9°03′45.22″W

Playing kits
Standard colours

Senior Club Championships
	All Ireland	Munster champions	Cork champions
Football:	0	0	1

Millstreet GAA is a Gaelic Athletic Association club located in Millstreet, County Cork, Ireland. The club is affiliated to the Duhallow Board and the Cork County Board and fields teams in both hurling and Gaelic football.

== History ==
Located in the town of Millstreet, about 30 miles northwest of Cork, Millstreet GAA Club was founded in 1888. The club had its first notable success in 1914, when a 1–03 to 0–00 win over O'Donovan Rossa secured the Cork IFC title. Millstreet claimed a second Cork IFC four years later following a 0–02 to 0–00 win over Knockavilla.

Millstreet was one of the first clubs to affiliate to the newly established Duhallow Board in 1933. The club operated in the junior ranks for a number of years, befor winning promotion back to the senior grade after winning the Cork JFC title in 1941. Arguably, Millstreet had its greatest ever success when, in 1948, a John O'Keeffe-captained team beat St Vincent's by 1–02 to 0–03 to win the Cork SFC title for the first and only time in the club's history.

After a number of years in the top flight of Cork football, Millstreet eventually returned to the junior ranks. The club had further Cork JFC title successes in 1963 and 2014.

== Honours ==
- Cork Senior Football Championship (1): 1948
- Cork Intermediate Football Championship (2): 1914, 1918
- Cork Junior A Football Championship (3): 1941, 1963, 2014
- Duhallow Junior A Football Championship (7): 1941, 1944, 1955, 1963, 1992, 2003, 2014
- Duhallow Junior A Hurling Championship (3): 1933, 1962, 1963
- Cork Minor B Hurling Championship (2): 2000, 2022

== Notable players ==
- John Coleman: All-Ireland SFC-winner (1973)
- Connie Hartnett: All-Ireland SFC-winner (1973)
- Humphrey Kelleher: All-Ireland SFC-winner (1973)
- Dinny Long: All-Ireland SFC-winner (1973)
