= 2023 Cork Premier Senior Football Championship =

- Dates: 8 June - 29 October 2023
- Teams: 12 clubs 5 divisions 1 university
- Sponsor: Bon Secours Hospital
- Champions: Castlehaven (6th title); Mark Collins (captain); James McCarthy (manager)
- Runners-up: Nemo Rangers; Alan O'Donovan (captain); Paul O'Donovan (manager)
- Relegated: Carrigaline

Tournament statistics
- Matches played: 34
- Goals scored: 58 (1.71 per match)
- Points scored: 721 (21.21 per match)
- Top scorer(s): Steven Sherlock (2-24)

The 2023 Cork Premier Senior Football Championship was the fourth staging of the Cork Premier Senior Football Championship and the 135th staging overall of a championship for the top-ranking Gaelic football teams in Cork. The draw for the group stage placings took place on 11 December 2022. The championship ran from 8 June to 29 October 2023.

Nemo Rangers entered the championship as the defending champions. Carrigaline's relegation ended eight years of top flight football for the club.

The final was played on 29 October 2023 at Páirc Uí Chaoimh in Cork, between Nemo Rangers and Castlehaven, in what was their fourth ever meeting in the final overall and a first meeting in three years. Castlehaven won the match by 0-11 to 0-09 to claim their sixth championship title overall and a first title in ten years.

Steven Sherlock was the championship's top scorer with 2-24.

== Team changes ==
=== To Championship ===
Promoted from the Cork Senior A Football Championship

- St. Michael's

=== From Championship ===
Relegated to the Cork Senior A Football Championship

- Newcestown

== Participating teams ==
=== Clubs ===
Team	Location	Colours	Manager	Captain
Ballincollig	Ballincollig	Green and white	Podsie O'Mahony	
Carbery Rangers	Rosscarbery	Green, white and gold	Séamus Hayes	
Carrigaline	Carrigaline	Blue and yellow	Michael Meaney	Ian Sheerin
Castlehaven	Castlehaven	Blue and white	James McCarthy	Mark Collins
Clonakilty	Clonakilty	Green and red	Martin O'Brien	Mark White
Douglas	Douglas	Green, white and black	Brian Collins	Darragh Kelly
Éire Óg	Ovens	Red and yellow	Paudie Kissane	
Mallow	Mallow	Red and yellow	Declan O'Connell	Ryan Harkin
Nemo Rangers	Trabeg	Black and green	Paul O'Donovan	Alan O'Donovan
St Finbarr's	Togher	Blue and yellow	Paul O'Keeffe	Ian Maguire
St Michael's	Togher	Green and yellow	Dave Egan	Andrew Murphy
Valley Rovers	Innishannon	Green and white	Paul Cronin	

=== Divisions and colleges ===
Team	Location	Colours	Manager	Captain(s)
Avondhu	North Cork	Black and yellow		Gavin Creedon; Jack Twomey
Beara	Beara Peninsula	Red and white	n/a	n/a
Carbery	West Cork	Purple and yellow	Tim Buckley	Brian O'Driscoll
Duhallow	North-West Cork	Orange and black	Ger O'Sullivan	Kevin Cremin; Jack Murphy; Donncha O'Connor
Imokilly	East Cork	Red and white	Eoin O'Neill	Tadhg O'Donoghue
Muskerry	Mid Cork	Green and white	Danny Buckley	William Rohan
University College Cork	College Road	Red and black		

== Group A ==
=== Group A table ===
Knockout stage

Team	Matches				Score			Pts
Team	Pld	W	D	L	For	Against	Diff	Pts
Castlehaven	3	2	1	0	45	37	8	5
Clonakilty	3	1	1	1	43	37	6	3
Valley Rovers	3	1	0	2	38	46	-8	2
Carbery Rangers	3	0	2	1	28	34	-6	2

=== Group A results ===
28 July 2023 Round 1	Castlehaven	0-11 - 0-11	Carbery Rangers	Ahamilla Complex
	M Collins 0-3 f, C Cahalane, J Cahalane 0-2 each, S Browne, D Cahalane (f), C Maguire, J O’Driscoll 0-1 each.	Report	D Hayes 0-4 (0-1 f), P Shanahan, J O’Rourke 0-3 f each, C Santry 0-1.	Referee: A Long (Argideen Rangers)

29 July 2023 Round 1	Clonakilty	0-20 - 1-09	Valley Rovers	Charlie Hurley Park
	C Daly 0-5 f, S McEvoy 0-4, S White, D Gough 0-3 each, M White 0-2, L O’Donovan, M Shanley, R Mannix 0-1 each.	Report	F Lynch 0-7 (0-3 f), C McCarthy 1-0, D Murphy, J O’Driscoll 0-1 each.	Referee: R Whelan (Aghada)

19 August 2023 Round 2	Valley Rovers	0-09 - 1-12	Castlehaven	Ahamilla Complex
	F Lynch (0-1 m), A Kenneally 0-2 each, A Walsh Murphy, D Murphy, J Kiely, R O’Sullivan, D O’Shea 0-1 each.	Report	J Cahalane 1-2, M Collins 0-5 f, C Cahalane, B Hurley, M Hurley, S Browne, J O’Neill 0-1 each.	Referee: J Regan (Lough Rovers)

20 August 2023 Round 2	Carbery Rangers	0-06 - 0-06	Clonakilty	St Mary's Park
	P O’Rourke 0-2, J O’Rourke (0-1 f), B Shanahan, B Hodnett, J Hodnett 0-1 each.	Report	D Gough, C Daly (0-1 f) 0-2 each, S White, R Mannix 0-1 each.	Referee: J Ryan (Macroom)

10 September 2023 Round 3	Carbery Rangers	0-11 - 1-14	Valley Rovers	Timoleague Grounds
	J O’Rourke 0-4 (0-1 f), P O’Rourke (f), J Fitzpatrick, B Kerr, D Hayes, C Santry, J O’Riordan, P Hodnett 0-1 each.	Report	F Lynch 0-8 (0-4 f, 0-1 mark, 0-1 45), B Crowley 0-3, E Delaney 1-0, D Murphy, A Kenneally, E O’Reilly 0-1each.	Referee: D Murnane (Macroom)

10 September 2023 Round 3	Castlehaven	1-16 - 1-14	Clonakilty	Charlie Hurley Park
	B Hurley 1-4 (0-1f), J Cahalane 0-4, M Hurley, M Collins (0-1f) 0-3 each, C Cahalane, S Browne 0-1 each.	Report	D Gough (0-1f), C Daly (0-3f) 0-4 each, M Shanley 1-0, R Mannix, J Leahy 0-2 each, B Ridgeway, T Clancy 0-1 each.	Referee: J Regan (Lough Rovers)

== Group B ==
=== Group B table ===
Knockout stage Relegation playoff

Team	Matches				Score			Pts
Team	Pld	W	D	L	For	Against	Diff	Pts
Nemo Rangers	3	3	0	0	43	27	16	6
Ballincollig	3	2	0	1	40	43	-3	4
Éire Óg	3	1	0	2	36	38	-2	2
Carrigaline	3	0	0	3	35	46	-11	0

=== Group B results ===
28 July 2023 Round 1	Nemo Rangers	2-11 - 0-06	Ballincollig	Páirc Uí Rinn
	M Cronin 1-3 (0-1 f), A O’Donovan 1-1, B O’Driscoll 0-3, P Kerrigan 0-2 (0-1f), C Horgan, O McElligott 0-1 each.	Report	C Dorgan 0-5 (0-2 f), S Kiely 0-1.	Referee: C Lane (Lyre)

29 July 2023 Round 1	Carrigaline	0-11 - 1-10	Éire Óg	Ballincollig Grounds
	B Coakley 0-4 (0-2 f), K O’Reilly 0-2, N Coakley, J Kelly, N O’Keeffe, C Barry, C O’Herlihy 0-1 each.	Report	J Cooper 1-1, D Goulding 0-4 (0-3 f), C O’Callaghan 0-2, J Sheehan, J Murphy, C McGoldrick 0-1 each.	Referee: C Dineen (Douglas)

20 August 2023 Round 2	Éire Óg	1-06 - 0-11	Nemo Rangers	Páirc Uí Rinn
	J Kelleher (1-0); J Murphy (0-3, 0-1 free); E O’Shea, C O’Callaghan (0-1 each).	Report	K O’Donovan, P Kerrigan (0-2 each); K Fulignati, B Cripps, L Connolly (0-1 free), O McElligott, J Horgan, R Corkery, L Horgan (0-1 each).	Referee: P O'Driscoll

20 August 2023 Round 2	Ballincollig	2-12 - 0-12	Carrigaline	Páirc Uí Rinn
	C Dorgan (1-4, 0-1 free); C Kiely (1-1); H Ahearne (0-3); D O’Mahony (0-2); L O’Connell, R Noonan (0-1 each).	Report	K O’Reilly (0-4, 0-1 mark); B Coakley (0-1 mark, 0-1 free), E Desmond (0-3 each); N Coakley, J McCarthy (0-1 each).	Referee: J Bermingham

10 September 2023 Round 3	Ballincollig	2-10 - 1-11	Éire Óg	Coachford Sportsfield
	C Dorgan 0-7 (0-2 f, 0-1 mark), D O’Mahony 1-1, L O’Connell 1-0, C Kiely 0-2.	Report	D Goulding 0-7 (0-6 f), C O’Callaghan 1-1, C Kelly (45), D McCarthy, J Sheehan 0-1 each.	Referee: A Long (Argideen Rangers)

10 September 2023 Round 3	Nemo Rangers	0-15 - 1-09	Carrigaline	Páic Liam Mhic Cárthaigh
	M Cronin (0-5, 2f), L Connolly (0-4, 2f), P Kerrigan (0-2), O McElligott, K Fulignati, J Horgan and G Sayers (0-1 each).	Report	B Coakley (0-4, 3f), C Barrett (1-0), N Coakley and K O’Reilly (0-2 each), J McCarthy (0-1).	Referee: R Whelan (Gleann na Laoi)

== Group C ==
=== Group C table ===
Knockout stage Relegation playoff

Team	Matches				Score			Pts
Team	Pld	W	D	L	For	Against	Diff	Pts
St. Finbarr's	3	3	0	0	60	29	31	6
Douglas	3	1	0	2	34	41	-7	2
St. Michael's	3	1	0	2	34	41	-7	2
Mallow	3	1	0	2	30	48	-18	2

=== Group C results ===
29 July 2023 Round 1	Douglas	2-08 - 2-07	St Michael's	Páirc Uí Rinn
	C Russell 1-3 (0-2f), K Flahive 1-0, S Powter, C Kingston, B Hartnett, A O’Hare, A Cantwell 0-1 each.	Report	A Murphy 1-2, S Falvey 1-0, T Deasy 0-2f, A Hennessy, R O’Shaughnessy, E Hickey 0-1 each.	Referee: D Murnane (Macroom)

29 July 2023 Round 1	St Finbarr's	4-15 - 0-09	Mallow	Blarney Grounds
	S Sherlock 1-10 (5f 1 45), I Maguire 2-1, E Twomey 1-0, J Barrett 0-2, W Buckley 0-1, B Hayes 0-1.	Report	K O’Sullivan 0-3 (3f), K Sheehan 0-2 (2f), S Merritt 0-1, S Hayes 0-1, R Harkin 0-1, S O’Callaghan 0-1.	Referee: J Ryan

19 August 2023 Round 2	Mallow	0-10 - 0-09	Douglas	Páirc Uí Rinn
	R Harkin 0-2 (0-1 m), J Browne, K O’Sullivan, J Dillon (f), D Moynihan, S McDonnell, M Kelleher, M Tobin, P Lyons 0-1 each.	Report	B Hartnett 0-2, C Russell 0-2 f, A O’Hare, A Cantwell, S Powter, S Wilson, A Sheehy 0-1 each.	Referee: R Whelan (Aghada)

19 August 2023 Round 2	St Michael's	0-09 - 2-10	St Finbarr's	Páirc Uí Rinn
	R Cotter (f), S Falvey (f), A Murphy 0-2 each, K Hegarty, A O’Callaghan, R O’Shaughnessy 0-1 each.	Report	S Sherlock 0-7 (0-4 f), C Scully, J Wigginton Barrett 1-0 each, B Hayes 0-2, W Buckley 0-1.	Referee: D Murnane (Macroom)

10 September 2023 Round 3	Mallow	0-11 - 0-12	St Michael's	Blarney Grounds
	K Sheehan (0-3 (one free, one mark); S McDonnell, R Harkin 0-2 each; K O’Sullivan, M Kelleher, E Stanton, S O’Callaghan 0-1 each.	Report	S Falvey 0-3; R Cotter (one free), A Hennessy 0-2 each; S Keating, D Meaney, A Murphy, R O’Shaughnessy, L O’Herlihy 0-1 each.	Referee: J Bermingham (Bride Rovers)

10 September 2023 Round 3	St Finbarr's	1-15 - 1-08	Douglas	Páirc Uí Rinn
	C Myers-Murray 0-6 (0-5 f), E Twomey 0-3, B Hayes 1-0, W Buckley 0-2, R McInerney (f), I Maguire, E Dennehy, E McGreevy (f) 0-1 each.	Report	C Russell 0-4 (0-2 f), B Hartnett 1-0 f, S Kingston 0-2, C Kingston, S Powter 0-1 each.	Referee: J Ryan (Macroom)

== Divisional/colleges section ==
=== Divisional/colleges section preliminary stage ===
8 June 2023 Round 1	Imokilly	1-13 - 0-12	Muskerry	Páirc Séamus de Barra
	A Berry (1-3), D Lynch (0-4, 0-3 frees), D Creedon (0-3, 0-2 frees), D Phelan (0-2), D Kearney (0-1).	Report	L Twohig (0-5, 0-3 frees), C Dineen (0-4), D Horgan (0-2), D Ambrose (0-1).	Referee: J Murphy (Castletownroche)

8 June 2023 Round 1	Avondhu	w/o - scr.	Beara
		Report

15 June 2023 Round 2	Muskerry	0-08 - 2-08	Duhallow	Coachford Sportsfield
	D Horgan 0-5, (0-4 frees), L Twohig (0-2), I Wycherley (0-1).	Report	L Murphy and D Linehan (1-0 each), M McAuliffe (0-3), D O’Connor (0-2, 0-1 free), J Curtin, L Moynihan and B O’Keeffe (0-1 each).	Referee: A O'Connor (Ballygarvan)

29 June 2023 Semi-final	Imokilly	1-09 - 2-15	Duhallow	Páirc Eoin Mhic Charthaigh
	A Berry (1-2), D Creedon (0-1 free) and D Byrne (0-2 each), T Hartnett, D Collins and D Kearney (0-1 each).	Report	M McAuliffe (2-3), D O’Connor (0-4, 0-1 free, 0-1 45), D O’Keeffe (0-3, 0-1 free), Seamus Hickey and L Murphy (0-2 each), K Crowley (0-1).	Referee: C Walsh (Nemo Rangers)

29 June 2023 Semi-final	Avondhu	1-07 - 1-10	Muskerry	Glenville Grounds
	D O’Brien 1-3f (1-0 pen, 0-3f), P Looney, W Fouhy, B Creedon (f), B Guerin 0-1 each.	Report	M Desmond 0-5 (4f), M Bradley 1-2, C Dineen 0-2, D Horgan 0-1f.	Referee: D Daly (Brian Dillons)

6 July 2023 Final	Duhallow	1-15 - 1-10	Muskerry	Dromtarriffe Grounds
	D O’Connor (0-7, 0-2 frees), J Curtin (1-3), C O’Callaghan, Shane Hickey, D Cashman, J Linehan (mark) and M McAuliffe (0-1 each).	Report	D Horgan (1-1, 0-1 free), M Desmond (0-3, 0-1 free), M Bradley (0-1 free) and I Wycherley (0-2 each), S Furey and A O’Sullivan (0-1 each).	Referee: C Murphy (Glanworth)

=== Divisional/colleges section semi-final ===
24 August 2023 Semi-final	Carbery	0-14 - 0-15	Duhallow	Páirc Uí Rinn
	R O’Donovan 0-4, B O’Driscoll 0-3 f, G O'Callaghan, O O’Donovan 0-2 each, Keith O’Driscoll, K Casey, J O’Regan 0-1 each.	Report	D O’Connor 0-6 (0-4 f), G O’Sullivan 0-3, J Curtin 0-2 (0-1 f), C O’Callaghan, S Hickey, D O’Keeffe (f), E Murphy 0-1 each.	Referee: C Dineen (Douglas)

=== Divisional/colleges section final ===
27 August 2023 Final	University College Cork	0-14 - 2-14	Duhallow	Páirc Uí Rinn
	S O’Conor 0-4 (0-3 f), R Quigley, K Falvey 0-3 each, I Jennings, A Crowley, J O’Mullane, C Ó Beaglaoich 0-1 each.	Report	D O’Connor 0-6 (0-4 f), M McAuliffe 2-0, L Murphy 0-4, G O’Sullivan 0-2, C O’Callaghan, S Hickey 0-1 each.	Referee: J Regan (Lough Rovers)

== Knockout stage ==
=== Bracket ===
Playoff
Douglas	0-12
St Michael's	1-08

Quarter-Finals
Nemo Rangers	0-05
Clonakilty	0-04
Duhallow	3-11
Douglas	0-10
Castlehaven	0-14
Ballincollig	1-08

Semi-Finals
Nemo Rangers	3-10
Duhallow	1-08
St Finbarr's	2-11
Castlehaven	1-16

Final
Nemo Rangers
Castlehaven

=== Relegation playoff ===
24 September 2023 Playoff	Mallow	1-06 - 2-03	Carrigaline	Blarney Grounds
	R Harkin 0-3, S Hayes 1-0, K Sheehan 0-2f, S McDonnell 0-1.	Report	B Coakley 2-1 (2-0 penalties), J McCarthy (0-1 mark), É Desmond 0-1 each.	Referee: C Dineen (Duuglas)

8 October 2023 Playoff replay	Mallow	3-09 - 1-10	Carrigaline	Blarney Grounds
	S McDonnell (1-3, 2fs), S Hayes (1-1), J Dillon (1-0), M Tobin (0-3, 1f), M Kelleher and P Hennessy (m) (0-1 each).	Report	B Coakley (1-1, 1-0 pen, 0-1f), E Desmond (0-4, 1f), N Coakley (0-2), J McCarthy, K O’Reilly (free) and D Griffin (0-1 each).	Referee: D Daly (Brian Dillons)

=== Playoff ===
22 September 2023 Playoff	Douglas	0-12 - 1-08	St Michael's	Páirc Uí Rinn
	C Russell 0-5 (0-3 f), S Kingston (45), S Powter 0-2 each, K Shanahan, B Hartnett, D Ward 0-1 each.	Report	R Cotter 1-3 (0-2 f), A Murphy, K Hegarty 0-2 each, R O’Shaughnessy 0-1.	Referee: A Long (Argideen Rangers)

=== Quarter-finals ===
23 September 2023 Quarter-final	Nemo Rangers	0-05 - 0-04	Clonakilty	Charlie Hurley Park
	M Cronin 0-3 (0-1 f), P Kerrigan, C Horgan 0-1 each.	Report	C Daly (f), D Gough (f), R Mannix (mark), L O’Donovan 0-1 each.	Referee: D Murnane (Macroom)

24 September 2023 Quarter-final	Ballincollig	1-08 - 0-14	Castlehaven	St Mary's Park
	C Dorgan 0-4 (0-3 f), D Dorgan 1-0, C Kiely, T O’Connell, D O‘Mahony, S Kiely 0-1 each.	Report	B Hurley 0-4 (0-1 f), J Cahalane, M Hurley, M Collins 0-2 each, Damien Cahalane, S Browne, C Maguire, J O’Neill 0-1 each.	Referee: J Regan (Lough Rovers)

1 October 2023 Quarter-final	Duhallow	3-11 - 0-10	Douglas	Páirc Uí Rinn
	L Murphy 0-5, D Cashman, Shane Hickey 1-1 each, M McAuliffe 1-0, Seamus Hickey, C O’Callaghan, D O’Connor (f), S Curtin 0-1 each.	Report	S Kingston 0-3, C Russell (f), S Powter 0-2 each, B Hartnett, A Cantwell, J Cunningham 0-1 each.	Referee: J Bermingham (Bride Rovers)

=== Semi-finals ===
8 October 2023 Semi-final	Nemo Rangers	3-10 - 1-08	Duhallow	Páirc Uí Chaoimh
	L Connolly 2-3 (0-3f), C Horgan 1-1, M Cronin 0-3 (0-2f), S Cronin, A O’Donovan, J Horgan 0-1 each.	Report	Donncha O’Connor 0-3f, L Murphy 1-0, C O’Callaghan, Séamus Hickey, G O’Sullivan, J Curtin, David O’Connor 0-1 each.	Referee: J Ryan (Macroom)

8 October 2023 Semi-final	St Finbarr's	2-11 - 1-16	Castlehaven	Páirc Uí Chaoimh
	S Sherlock 1-7 (0-3 f, 1-0 pen), E Twomey 1-2, B Hayes 0-2.	Report	M Hurley 0-7 (0-1 m), B Hurley 0-5 (0-1 f, 0-1 m), J Cahalane 1-1, R Maguire, M Collins, C Maguire 0-1 each.	Referee: P O'Driscoll (Bride Rovers)

=== Final ===
29 October 2023 Final	Nemo Rangers	0-09 - 0-11	Castlehaven	Páirc Uí Chaoimh
	M Cronin (0-3, 0-3 frees), L Connolly (0-3, 0-1 free); B Cripps, B O’Driscoll, J Horgan (0-1 each).	Report	B Hurley (0-3 frees, 0-1 mark), M Hurley (0-5 each); S Browne (0-1).	Referee: P O'Driscoll

== Championship statistics ==
=== Top scorers ===
Overall

Rank	Player	Club	Tally	Total	Matches	Average
1	Steven Sherlock	St Finbarr's	2-24	30	3	10.00
2	Donncha O'Connor	Duhallow	0-29	29	7	4.14
3	Cian Dorgan	Ballincollig	1-20	23	4	5.75
4	Mikey McAuliffe	Duhallow	5-07	22	7	3.14
4	Brian Coakley	Carrigaline	3-13	22	5	4.40
4	Brian Hurley	Castlehaven	1-19	22	5	4.40
7	Mark Cronin	Nemo Rangers	1-17	20	6	3.33
8	Conor Russell	Douglas	1-16	19	5	3.80
9	Michael Hurley	Castlehaven	0-18	18	6	3.00
10	Luke Connolly	Nemo Rangers	2-11	17	5	3.40
10	Jack Cahalane	Castlehaven	2-11	17	6	2.83
10	Luke Murphy	Duhallow	2-11	17	7	2.42
10	Fiachra Lynch	Valley Rovers	0-17	17	3	5.66

In a single game

Rank	Player	Club	Tally	Total	Opposition
1	Steven Sherlock	St Finbarr's	1-10	13	Mallow
2	Steven Sherlock	St Finbarr's	1-07	10	Castlehaven
3	Mikey McAuliffe	Duhallow	2-03	9	Imokilly
3	Luke Connolly	Nemo Rangers	2-03	9	Duhallow
5	Fiachra Lynch	Valley Rovers	0-08	8	Carbery Rangers
6	Ian Maguire	St Finbarr's	2-01	7	Mallow
6	Brian Coakley	Carrigaline	2-01	7	Mallow
6	Brian Hurley	Castlehaven	1-04	7	Clonakilty
6	Cian Dorgan	Ballincollig	1-04	7	Carrigaline
6	Donncha O'Connor	Duhallow	0-07	7	Muskerry
6	Fiachra Lynch	Valley Rovers	0-07	7	Clonakilty
6	Steven Sherlock	St Finbarr's	0-07	7	St Michael's
6	Cian Dorgan	Ballincollig	0-07	7	Éire óg
6	Daniel Goulding	Éire óg	0-07	7	Ballincollig
6	Michael Hurley	Castlehaven	0-07	7	St Finbarr's

=== Miscellaneous ===
- The Group C round 2 match between St Finbarr's and St Michael's, originally scheduled for 18 August 2023, was postponed by 24 hours due to Storm Betty.
- Donncha O'Connor became the first player to surpass the cumulative total of 400 points when he scored six points in the divisional/colleges section game against Carbery.
