= Luke Murphy (Gaelic footballer) =

Irish Gaelic footballer (born 2002)

Personal information
- Native name: Lúc Ó Murchú (Irish)
- Born: 2002 (age 23–24) Cullen, County Cork, Ireland
- Occupation: Physiotherapist

Sport
- Sport: Gaelic Football
- Position: Full-forward
Clubs
Years	Club	Apps (scores)
2020-present 2021-present	Cullen → Duhallow	12 (3-77); 14 (7-36)
Club titles
- Cork titles: 0
College
- Years: College
- 2000-2024: University of Limerick
College titles
- Sigerson titles: 0
Inter-county
Years	County	Apps (scores)
2025-	Cork	0 (0-00)
Inter-county titles
- Munster titles: 0
- All-Irelands: 0
- NFL: 0
- All Stars: 0

Luke Murphy (born 2002) is an Irish Gaelic footballer. At club level, he plays with Cullen, divisional side Duhallow and at inter-county level with the Cork senior football team. Murphy usually lines out as a forward.

== Career ==
Murphy played Gaelic football at all levels as a student at Boherbue Comprehensive School. He was part of the school's senior team that won the Munster PPS SDFC title in 2019 after a 7-08 to 2-11 defeat of Colaiste Ghobnatan. Murphy later attended University of Limerick and lined out in the Sigerson Cup.

At club level, Murphy plays with Cullen. He won a Duhallow JAFC title in 2022, after scoring 1-09 and being named man of the match in the 23-point defeat of Kanturk in the final. Murphy has also earned inclusion on the Duhallow team and won a Tadhg Crowley Cup title with the division in 2023.

Murphy first played for Cork at inter-county level as a member of the minor team. He won an All-Ireland MFC medal in 2019, after coming on as a substitute in the 3-20 to 3-14 extra-time defeat of Galway in the final. Murphy joined the senior team during the National League in January 2025.

== Career statistics ==
=== Club ===
As of 7 September 2025.

Team	Year	Cork JAFC		Munster		All-Ireland		Total	
Team	Year	Apps	Score	Apps	Score	Apps	Score	Apps	Score
Cullen	2020	—		—		—		—	
Cullen	2021	—		—		—		—	
Cullen	2022	1	0-05	—		—		1	0-05
Cullen	Total	1	0-05	—		—		1	0-05
Cullen	Year	Cork PJFC		Munster		All-Ireland		Total	
Cullen	Year	Apps	Score	Apps	Score	Apps	Score	Apps	Score
Cullen	2023	4	1-16	—		—		4	1-16
Cullen	2024	3	0-24	—		—		3	0-24
Cullen	2025	4	2-32	—		—		4	2-32
Cullen	Total	11	3-72	—		—		11	3-72
Career total		12	3-77	—		—		12	3-77

=== Division ===
As of match played 28 September 2025.

Team	Year	Cork PSHC	
Team	Year	Apps	Score
Duhallow	2021	0	0-00
Duhallow	2022	2	0-02
Duhallow	2023	7	2-11
Duhallow	2024	2	2-07
Duhallow	2025	3	3-16
Career total		14	7-36

=== Inter-county ===
As of match played 15 February 2025

Team	Year	National League			Munster		All-Ireland		Total	
Team	Year	Division	Apps	Score	Apps	Score	Apps	Score	Apps	Score
Cork	2025	Division 2	0	0-00	0	0-00	0	0-00	0	0-00
Total			0	0-00	0	0-00	0	0-00	0	0-00

== Honours ==
Boherbue Comprehensive School

- Munster PPS Senior D Football Championship: 2019

Cullen

- Duhallow Junior A Football Championship: 2022

division 7 County football league: 2024

Duhallow

- Tadhg Crowley Cup: 2023

Cork

- All-Ireland Minor Football Championship: 2019
