= Conor Daly (Gaelic footballer) =

Irish Gaelic footballer

Personal information
- Native name: Conchur Ó Dálaigh (Irish)
- Born: 2003 (age 22–23) Clonakilty, County Cork, Ireland
- Occupation: Student

Sport
- Sport: Gaelic Football
- Position: Full-forward
Club
- Years: Club
- 2021–present: Clonakilty
Club titles
- Cork titles: 0
College
- Years: College
- 2022–present: University College Cork
College titles
- Sigerson titles: 0
Inter-county
- Years: County
- 2026–: Cork
Inter-county titles
- Munster titles: 0
- All-Irelands: 0
- NFL: 0
- All Stars: 0

Conor Daly (born 2003) is an Irish Gaelic footballer. At club level he plays with Clonakilty and at inter-county level with the Cork senior football team.

== Career ==
Daly played Gaelic football at all grades as a student at Clonakilty Community College, including in the Simcox Cup and Corn Uí Mhuirí. He later lined out with University College Cork in the Sigerson Cup. At club level, Daly has played with Clonakilty's senior team since 2021.

Daly first appeared on the inter-county scene for Cork as a member of the under-20 team in 2022. He was drafted onto the senior team in advance of the 2026 National Football League.

== Career statistics ==
=== Club ===
As of 14 September 2025.

Team	Season	Cork PSFC	
Team	Season	Apps	Score
Clonakilty	2021	6	0-02
Clonakilty	2022	3	0-07
Clonakilty	2023	4	0-12
Clonakilty	2024	4	1-20
Clonakilty	2025	3	2-09
Career total		20	3-50

=== Inter-county ===
As of 21 February 2026

Team	Year	National League			Munster		All-Ireland		Total	
Team	Year	Division	Apps	Score	Apps	Score	Apps	Score	Apps	Score
Cork	2026	Division 2	1	0-00	0	0-00	0	0-00	1	0-00
Career total			1	0-00	0	0-00	0	0-00	1	0-00
