= Seán McDonnell =

Irish Gaelic footballer

Personal information
- Native name: Seán Mac Dónaill (Irish)
- Born: 2001 (age 24–25) Mallow, County Cork, Ireland
- Occupation: Student

Sport
- Sport: Gaelic Football
- Position: Left corner-forward
Club
| Years | Club | Apps (scores) |
| 2019-present | Mallow | 28 (7-51) |
Club titles
- Cork titles: 0
College
- Years: College
- 2000-2025: University of Limerick
College titles
- Sigerson titles: 0
Inter-county
| Years | County | Apps (scores) |
| 2025- | Cork | 0 (0-00) |
Inter-county titles
- Munster titles: 0
- All-Irelands: 0
- NFL: 0
- All Stars: 0

Seán McDonnell (born 2001) is an Irish Gaelic footballer. At club level, he plays with Mallow and at inter-county level with the Cork senior football team. McDonnell usually lines out as a forward.

== Career ==
McDonnell plays club football with Mallow and, after beginning at juvenile and underage levels, progressed to adult level in 2019. He won a Cork SAFC title in 2021, after scoring a goal from full-forward in the 2-12 to 0-15 defeat of St. Michael's in the final. McDonnall has also played with University of Limerick in the Sigerson Cup.

At inter-county level, McDonnell first played for Cork at minor level in 2018. He progressed to the under-20 team and won a Munster U2FC medal in 2021 after a 3-20 to 3-10 win over Kerry. McDonnell made his senior team debut in a National League game against Meath in January 2025.

== Career statistics ==
=== Club ===
As of match played 14 September 2025.

| Team | Year | Cork SFC | |
| Team | Year | Apps | Score |
|---|---|---|---|
| Mallow | 2019 | 2 | 0-02 |
| Mallow | Total | 2 | 0-02 |
| Mallow | Year | Cork SAFC | |
| Mallow | Year | Apps | Score |
| Mallow | 2020 | 5 | 0-02 |
| Mallow | 2021 | 5 | 3-04 |
| Mallow | Total | 10 | 3-06 |
| Mallow | Year | Cork PSFC | |
| Mallow | Year | Apps | Score |
| Mallow | 2022 | 4 | 1-08 |
| Mallow | 2023 | 4 | 1-07 |
| Mallow | 2024 | 5 | 2-19 |
| Mallow | 2025 | 3 | 0-09 |
| Mallow | Total | 16 | 4-43 |
| Career total | | 28 | 7-51 |

=== Inter-county ===
As of match played 15 February 2025

| Team | Year | National League | | | Munster | | All-Ireland | | Total | |
| Team | Year | Division | Apps | Score | Apps | Score | Apps | Score | Apps | Score |
|---|---|---|---|---|---|---|---|---|---|---|
| Cork | 2025 | Division 2 | 3 | 1-05 | 0 | 0-00 | 0 | 0-00 | 3 | 0-00 |
| Total | | | 3 | 1-05 | 0 | 0-00 | 0 | 0-00 | 3 | 1-05 |

== Honours ==
Mallow

- Cork Senior A Football Championship: 2021

Cork

- Munster Under-20 Football Championship: 2021
