= Adrian White (hurler) =

Irish hurler

Personal information
- Native name: Dreáin de Faoite (Irish)
- Born: 1972 (age 53–54) Barryroe, County Cork, Ireland

Sport
- Sport: Hurling
- Position: Right corner-back
Clubs
- Years: Club
- Barryroe → Carbery
Club titles
- Cork titles: 1
Inter-county
Years	County	Apps (scores)
1993–1995	Cork	0 (0-00)
Inter-county titles
- Munster titles: 0
- All-Irelands: 0
- NHL: 0
- All Stars: 0

Adrian White (born 1972) is an Irish retired hurler. At club level, he played with Barryroe, divisional side Carbery, and also lined out at inter-county level with various Cork teams.

== Playing career ==
White played all grades of hurling and Gaelic football at club level with Barryroe. He won several divisional titles in the minor and under-21 grades before progressing to adult level. Between 1994 and 2007, White was part of three West Cork JAHC title-winning teams. He added a Cork JAHC medal to his collection in 2007 after a 2–19 to 2–13 defeat of Charleville in the final. White also earned selection for Carbery and won a Cork SHC medal after lining out with the team in their 3–13 to 3–06 win over Midleton in the 1996 final.

At inter-county level, White first appeared for Cork at minor level in 1990. He won a Munster MHC medal that year, but later faced defeat by Kilkenny in the 1990 All-Ireland minor final. White later progressed to under-21 level and won a Munster U21HC medal after Cork's 1-18 to 3-09 win over Limerick in 1993.

White also progressed to the senior team and made a number of appearances in the National Hurling League. He also won two Munster JHC medals before ending his inter-county career by collecting an All-Ireland JHC medal at corner-back in 1994.

== Personal life ==
His sons, Seán and Mark White, have played Gaelic football with the Cork senior football team.

== Honours ==
Barryroe

- Cork Junior A Hurling Championship: 2007
- West Cork Junior A Hurling Championship: 1994, 2006, 2007

Carbery

- Cork Senior Hurling Championship: 1994

Cork

- All-Ireland Junior Hurling Championship: 1994
- Munster Junior Hurling Championship: 1992, 1994
- Munster Under-21 Hurling Championship: 1993
- Munster Minor Hurling Championship: 1990
