= Seán White (Gaelic footballer) =

Irish Gaelic footballer (born 1995)

Personal information
- Native name: Seán de Faoite (Irish)
- Born: 14 March 1995 (age 31) Clonakilty, County Cork, Ireland
- Occupation: Accountant
- Height: 6 ft 0 in (183 cm)

Sport
- Sport: Gaelic Football
- Position: Midfield
Club*
Years	Club	Apps (scores)
2013-present	Clonakilty	26 (2-22)
Club titles
- Cork titles: 0
College
- Years: College
- 2013-2017: University College Cork
College titles
- Sigerson titles: 0
Inter-county**
Years	County	Apps (scores)
2016-2021	Cork	12 (0-05)
Inter-county titles
- Munster titles: 0
- All-Irelands: 0
- NFL: 0
- All Stars: 0
- * club appearances and scores correct as of 15:45, 6 December 2021. **Inter County team apps and scores correct as of 15:45, 6 December 2021.

Seán White (born 14 March 1995) is an Irish Gaelic footballer who plays at club level with Clonakilty. He is a former member of the Cork senior football team.

== Career ==
White first came to prominence as a dual player with the Clonakilty club, while simultaneously lining out with Clonakilty Community College in the Corn Uí Mhuirí. At club level he has won several divisional titles at all grades of hurling and Gaelic football, while he also lined out in the 2021 Cork PSFC final defeat by St. Finbarr's. White first appeared on the inter-county scene as a member of the Cork minor football team in 2013. He later spent a period with the under-21 team and was at midfield when Cork lost the 2016 All-Ireland under-21 final to Mayo. White was added to the senior team as a development player in 2014, however, it would be another two years before he made his first competitive appearance. He was later joined on the team by his brother Mark. White left the Cork senior football team in January 2022.

== Career statistics ==
=== Club ===
As of match played 28 November 2021.

Team	Year	Cork PSFC	
Team	Year	Apps	Score
Clonakilty	2013	1	0-00
Clonakilty	2014	3	0-00
Clonakilty	2015	3	0-02
Clonakilty	2016	3	0-04
Clonakilty	2017	1	0-03
Clonakilty	2018	4	1-04
Clonakilty	2019	3	0-04
Clonakilty	2020	2	0-02
Clonakilty	2021	6	1-03
Career total		26	2-22

=== Inter-county ===
As of match played 25 July 2021.

Team	Year	National League			Munster		All-Ireland		Total	
Team	Year	Division	Apps	Score	Apps	Score	Apps	Score	Apps	Score
Cork	2016	Division 1	0	0-00	1	0-00	0	0-00	1	0-00
Cork	2017	Division 2	0	0-00	0	0-00	1	0-00	1	0-00
Cork	2018	Division 2	5	1-08	2	0-01	1	0-00	8	1-09
Cork	2019	Division 2	3	0-01	1	0-01	4	0-02	8	0-04
Cork	2020	Division 3	5	0-03	2	0-01	—		7	0-04
Cork	2021	Division 2	4	1-02	0	0-00	—		4	1-02
Total			17	2-14	6	0-03	6	0-02	29	2-19

== Honours ==
Clonakilty

- West Cork Junior A Hurling Championship: 2012, 2015
- West Cork Under-21 A Football Championship: 2013, 2014, 2015
- West Cork Minor A Hurling Championship: 2013

Cork

- Munster Under-21 Football Championship: 2014, 2016
