= 2025 Cork Premier Senior Football Championship =

Annual Gaelic football competition season

- Dates: 3 July - 26 October 2025
- Teams: 12 clubs 3 divisions 1 university
- Sponsor: McCarthy Insurance Group
- Champions: St Finbarr's (11th title); Steven Sherlock (captain); Brian Roche (manager)
- Runners-up: Nemo Rangers; Alan O'Donovan (captain); Robbie O'Dwyer (manager)
- Relegated: Carbery Rangers

Tournament statistics
- Matches played: 30
- Goals scored: 73 (2.43 per match)
- Points scored: 780 (26 per match)
- Top scorer(s): Steven Sherlock (6-41)

The 2025 Cork Premier Senior Football Championship was the sixth staging of the Cork Premier Senior Football Championship and the 137th staging overall of a championship for the top-ranking Gaelic football teams in Cork. The draw for the group stage placings took place on 10 December 2024. The championship ran from 3 July to 26 October 2025.

Castlehaven entered the championship as the defending champions, however, they were beaten by St Finbarr's in the quarter-finals. One-time champions Carbery Rangers' relegation brought an end to 19 years of top tier football for the club.

The final was played on 26 October 2025 at SuperValu Páirc Uí Chaoimh in Cork, between St Finbarr's and Nemo Rangers, in what was their fifth meeting in the final overall and a first meeting in three years. St Finbarr's won the match by 1-14 to 1-13 to claim their 11th championship title overall and a first title in four years.

Steven Sherlock was the championship's top scorer with 6-41.

== Team changes ==
=== To Championship ===
Promoted from the Cork Senior A Football Championship

- Carrigaline

=== From Championship ===
Relegated to the Cork Senior A Football Championship

- Éire Óg

== Participating teams ==
=== Clubs ===
Team	Location	Colours	Manager	Captain
Ballincollig	Ballincollig	Green and white	Podsie O'Mahony	Luke Fahy
Carbery Rangers	Rosscarbery	Green, white and gold	Séamus Hayes	Paul Shanahan
Carrigaline	Carrigaline	Blue and yellow	Michael Meaney	
Castlehaven	Castlehaven	Blue and white	Seánie Cahalane	Mark Collins
Clonakilty	Clonakilty	Green and red	Martin O'Brien	
Douglas	Douglas	Green, white and black		
Mallow	Mallow	Red and yellow	Andrew Cashman	Matty Taylor
Nemo Rangers	Trabeg	Black and green	Robbie O'Dwyer	Alan O'Donovan
Newcestown	Newcestown	Red and yellow	Jim O'Sullivan	Luke Meade
St Finbarr's	Togher	Blue and yellow	Brian Roche	
St Michael's	Blackrock	Green and yellow	Pat Doyle	
Valley Rovers	Innishannon	Green and white	Denis Kiely	Eoin Delaney; Jacob O'Driscoll

=== Divisions and colleges ===
Team	Location	Colours	Manager	Captain
Carbery	West Cork	Purple and yellow	Colm Aherne	
Duhallow	Duhallow	Orange and black	Ger O'Sullivan	Dan Buckley
Muskerry	Mid Cork	Green and white	Conor Hurley	Chris Óg Jones
University College Cork	College Road	Red and black		

== Group 1 ==
=== Group 1 table ===
Quarter-finalist Relegation playoff

Team	Matches				Score			Pts
Team	Pld	W	D	L	For	Against	Diff	Pts
Newcestown	3	3	0	0	53	42	11	6
Castlehaven	3	2	0	1	54	39	15	4
Mallow	3	1	0	2	54	53	1	2
Valley Rovers	3	0	0	3	49	76	-27	0

=== Group 1 results ===
26 July 2025 Round 1	Castlehaven	1-13 - 0-12	Mallow	Ovens Grounds
	M Collins 0-6 (0-3 f, 1 2pt), J Cahalane 1-0, C Maguire 0-3 (1 2pt), S Browne, C Cahalane, M Hurley, M Maguire 0-1 each.	Report	J Dillon 0-4 (1 2pt, 0-1 f), M O’Rourke 0-3, E Kelleher 0-2, S McDonnell (f), M Taylor, J Glynn 0-1 each.

26 July 2025 Round 1	Newcestown	1-19 - 0-16	Valley Rovers	Jack Fitzgerald Memorial Park
	D Buckley 0-12 (3 2ptf, 0-3 f, 1 2pt), S O’Sullivan 1-1, R O’Sullivan, T Twomey, S O’Donovan, E Collins, C Keane, J Meade 0-1 each.	Report	F Lynch 0-6 (1 2pt, 0-2 f), R O’Sullivan 0-3 (1 pt), C O’Leary, S McEntee 0-2 (1 pt) each, A Walsh Murphy, W Hurley, D Muckian 0-1 each.

22 August 2025 Round 2	Mallow	1-13 - 0-19	Newcestown	Castle Grounds
	S McDonnell 0-5 (1 2pt, 1 2ptf), K Sheehan 0-3 (0-1 f), J Loughrey 1-0, M O’Rourke 0-2, E Kelleher, E Stanton, S Merritt (45) 0-1 each.	Report	D Buckley 0-11 (2 2ptf, 0-3 f), L Meade 0-3 (1 2pt), S O’Sullivan 0-2, T Twomey, C Keane, N Kelly 0-1 each.

23 August 2025 Round 2	Valley Rovers	1-12 - 2-22	Castlehaven	Ahamilla Complex
	F Lynch 0-5 (1 2pt, 0-1 f), J O’Driscoll 1-0, A Walsh-Murphy 0-3, B Curtin 0-2 (1 2pt f), J Cottrell (f), C McCarthy 0-1 each.	Report	B Hurley 0-9 (0-8 f), M Collins 0-4, J Cahalane, R Minihane 1-1 each, M Maguire 0-3, C Cahalane 0-2, J O’Driscoll, Damien Cahalane 0-1 each.

14 September 2025 Round 3	Castlehaven	0-10 - 0-12	Newcestown	Rossmore Grounds
	M Hurley 0-4 (0-1 f), J Cahalane 0-2, C Cahalane, R Maguire, R Minihane, B Hurley 0-1 each.	Report	D Buckley (0-2 f), T Twomey 0-5 each, D McAree, L Meade 0-1 each.

14 September 2025 Round 3	Mallow	2-20 - 1-15	Valley Rovers	Blarney Grounds
	K Sheehan 1-3 (1 2pt f), E Kelleher 0-4, J Loughrey 1-0, S McDonnell (1 2pt), M O’Rourke (1 2pt), J Dillon 0-3 each, T Kiely 0-2, M Taylor, S Copps 0-1 each.	Report	F Lynch 0-5 (0-2 f), J Walsh 1-1, B Curtin 0-4 (2 2pt f), D Murphy 0-2, S McEntee, C McCarthy, A Walsh Murphy 0-1.

== Group 2 ==
=== Group 2 table ===
Quarter-finalist Relegation playoff

Team	Matches				Score			Pts
Team	Pld	W	D	L	For	Against	Diff	Pts
St Finbarr's	3	3	0	0	58	36	22	6
Carrigaline	3	2	0	1	49	61	-12	4
Clonakilty	3	1	0	2	51	44	7	2
Carbery Rangers	3	0	0	3	33	50	-17	0

=== Group 2 results ===
26 July 2025 Round 1	Clonakilty	1-12 - 1-13	St Finbarr's	Charlie Hurley Park
	C Daly 1-1, D Gough 0-4 (0-1 f), D Ó Sé (1 2pt f), S White 0-2 each, R Mannix, S McEvoy, D Lowney 0-1 each.	Report	S Sherlock 0-6 (0-4 f, 0-1 45), C Dennehy 1-1, W Buckley 0-3, J Wigginton-Barrett 0-2, F Crowley 0-1.

27 July 2025 Round 1	Carbery Rangers	1-13 - 2-11	Carrigaline	Páirc Naomh Eoin
	J O’Rourke 1-3 (0-1 f), P Hodnett 0-5 (2 2pt), T Cullinane 0-3 (0-1 f), James O’Riordan, B Hodnett 0-1 each.	Report	B Coakley 1-5 (1 2pt f), E Desmond 1-3 (0-2 f), B O’Driscoll, N Coakley (f), E Landers 0-1 each.

24 August 2025 Round 2	Carrigaline	3-13 - 1-13	Clonakilty	Charlie Hurley Park
	N Coakley 1-2 (0-1 f), B O'Driscoll (1 2pt), E Desmond 0-3 each, R Delaney, C Barrett 1-0 each, B Coakley 0-2 (0-1 f), K O’Reilly, J McCarthy, C Kearney 0-1 each.	Report	C Daly 1-3 (0-2 f), D Gough (0-2 f), D Ó Sé 0-3 each, R Mannix 0-2, S White, B Ridgeway 0-1 each.

24 August 2025 Round 2	St Finbarr's	1-10 - 0-11	Carbery Rangers	Charlie Hurley Park
	S Sherlock 1-4 (0-2 f), E Twomey 0-4, C Myers-Murray, I Maguire 0-1 each.	Report	J O’Rourke 0-3 (0-1 f), T Cullinane (0-1 f), C Twomey, P O’Rourke 0-2 each, P Shanahan (45), J Kevane 0-1 each.

14 September 2025 Round 3	Clonakilty	1-17 - 0-06	Carbery Rangers	Ballinacarriga Grounds
	D Gough (1f), C Daly (1 2pt, 1f) (0-5 each), M White (0-3, 1 2ptf, 1 45), L O’Donovan (1-0), D Lowney, B Ridgeway, S McEvoy, R Mannix (0-1 each).	Report	J O’Rourke (0-2, 1f), P Hodnett, B Hodnett, J O’Brien, T Cullinane (0-1 each).

14 September 2025 Round 3	St Finbarr's	2-23 - 0-10	Carrigaline	Páirc Uí Rinn
	S Sherlock (1-14, 3tpf, 1tpsl, 2 frees, 1 45); J Wigginton-Barrett (1-0); W Buckley, E Twomey, R Barrett (0-2 each); I Maguire, E McGreevy (0-1 each).	Report	N Coakley (0-5, 4 frees, 1 mark); É Desmond (0-3, 2 frees); J McCarthy, K O’Reilly (0-1 each).

== Group 3 ==
=== Group 3 table ===
Semi-finalist Quarter-finalist

Team	Matches				Score			Pts
Team	Pld	W	D	L	For	Against	Diff	Pts
Nemo Rangers	3	3	0	0	67	40	27	6
Ballincollig	3	1	1	1	44	44	0	3
Douglas	3	1	0	2	36	35	1	2
St Michael's	3	0	1	2	31	59	-28	1

=== Group 3 results ===
25 July 2025 Round 1	Ballincollig	1-14 - 1-16	Nemo Rangers	Páirc Uí Rinn
	C Dorgan 0-5 (0-2 f, 1 2pt f), S O’Neill 1-1, S Kiely, B O’Connell, D O’Mahony 0-2 each, L Fahy, P O’Neill 0-1 each.	Report	M Cronin 0-8 (0-7 f), B Hayes 1-3, M A Martin (45), B Murphy, K O’Donovan, R Dalton, C Horgan 0-1 each.

26 July 2025 Round 1	Douglas	1-12 - 0-04	St Michael's	Ted Hanley Memorial Park
	C Russell 0-8 (0-4 f), S Powter 1-0, S Coakley 0-3 (1 2pt f), J Cunningham 0-1.	Report	K Hegarty 0-2, D Meaney, A Hennessy 0-1 each.

22 August 2025 Round 2	Nemo Rangers	1-15 - 1-07	Douglas	Páirc Uí Rinn
	M Cronin 0-6 (1 2pt, 1 2pt f, 0-1 f), C Horgan 1-2, R Dalton 0-3 (1 2pt), K O’Donovan 0-2, K Histon, B Hayes 0-1 each.	Report	S Kingston 0-5 (0-1 f), S Coakley 1-2 (0-1 f).

24 August 2025 Round 2	St Michael's	0-14 - 1-11	Ballincollig	Páirc Uí Rinn
	L O’Herlihy 0-5 (0-4 f), F Leahy, A Hennessy 0-3 each, E Buckley, E Hickey, L O’Sullivan 0-1 each.	Report	C Dorgan 0-4 (0-3 f), D O’Mahony 1-0, S Kiely (0-1 45) 0-2, P O’Neill 0-2 (1 tpt), B O’Connell, S O’Neill, D Demond 0-1 each.

14 September 2025 Round 3	Ballincollig	1-10 - 0-11	Douglas	Páirc Liam Mhic Cárthaigh
	C Dorgan 1-6 (1-0 pen, 1 2pt f, 0-3 f), JP Murphy, L Fahy, B O’Connell, S O’Neill 0-1 each.	Report	S Kingston 0-5 (2 2pt), L Dwan-Fogarty (1 2pt), C Russell (45) 0-2 each, S Coakley (f), B Powter 0-1 each.

14 September 2025 Round 3	Nemo Rangers	4-18 - 0-13	St Michael's	Ted Hanley Memorial Park
	M Cronin (1-7, 1-0 pen, 1 2pt, 1 2ptf, 0-2 frees), B Hayes (0-6, 3 2pt), C Horgan (1-2, 0-1 free), B Cripps and C Kiely (1-0 each), K Histon, A O’Donovan, K O’Donovan (0-1 each).	Report	L O’Herlihy (0-8, 1 2pt, 2 2ptf, 0-2 frees), E Hegarty (0-2, 2pt), R O’Shaughnessy, E Buckley and R Kavanagh (0-1 each).

== Division/colleges section ==
=== Division/colleges seeded section semi-finals ===
3 July 2025 Semi-final	University College Cork	4-12 - 4-18	Duhallow	Mallow GAA Complex
	C O’Mahony 0-5 (1 2pt f, 1 2pt, 0-1 45), E Daly 1-2, J Horgan 1-1, M Murphy, F O’Sullivan 1-0 each, F O’Brien 0-2, T Hannifin, S Aherne 0-1 each.	Report	L Murphy 1-7 (0-2 f), J Curtin 2-1, D O’Connor 1-2, S Hickey 0-3, S Meehan, C O’Callaghan, D Linehan, C Curtin, L Moynihan 0-1 each.	Referee: R Whelan (Gleann na Laoi)

8 July 2025 Semi-final	Carbery	1-18 - 7-11	Muskerry	Castletown Grounds
	O Corcoran 1-5 (1 2pt), D Gore 0-5 (0-3 f), R O’Donovan (0-1 f), K O’Driscoll, S Daly, K Casey 1 2pt) 0-2 each.	Report	C Óg Jones 3-4 (1-0 penalty, 1 2ptf), L O’Connor 1-3, I Jones 1-2, A Quinn 1-1, C O’Donovan 1-0, D Ó Laoire 0-1.	Referee: J Regan (Lough Rovers)

=== Division/colleges seeded section final ===
15 July 2025 Final	Duhallow	4-09 - 0-13	Muskerry	Páirc Nóra Ní Iarlaithe
	L Murphy 1-6 (0-2 f), D Cashman 1-1, G O’Sullivan, J Curtin 1-0 each, D O’Connor 0-2.	Report	C Óg Jones 0-4 (0-3 f), L O’Connor 0-3 (0-2 f), D O’Leary 0-3 (tp), A O’Sullivan, C O’Donovan, I Jones 0-1 each.

== Relegation stage ==
=== Relegation playoff ===
27 September 2025 Playoff	Carbery Rangers	1-09 - 1-09	Valley Rovers	St Mary's Park
	P Hodnett 1-4, T Cullinane 0-3, J O’Rourke 0-2.	Report	C McCarthy 0-5 (1 2pt), A Walsh-Murphy 0-3, J O’Driscoll 1-0, F Lynch 0-1.

11 October 2025 Playoff replay	Carbery Rangers	1-10 - 1-16	Valley Rovers	St Mary's Park
	C Santry 0-4 (1 2pt), T Cullinane 1-1, J O’Rourke 0-3f, P Hodnett 0-2.	Report	F Lynch 1-9 (3 2ptf, 0-2 f), E Guinane, C McCarthy 0-2 each, J Walsh, A Walsh-Murphy, S McEntee 0-1 each.

== Knockout stage ==
=== Bracket ===
Quarter-Finals
Newcestown (Carbery)	0–18 (p)
Carrigaline (Carrighoun)	0–18
St Finbarr's (Seandún)	6–11
Castlehaven (Carbery)	0–19
Ballincollig (Muskerry)	1–15
Duhallow	2–11

Semi-Finals
Nemo Rangers (Seandún)	2–14
Newcestown (Carbery)	0–19
St Finbarr's (Seandún)	2–13
Ballincollig (Muskerry)	1–10

Final
Nemo Rangers (Seandún)	1–13
St Finbarr's (Seandún)	1–14

=== Quarter-finals ===
28 September 2025 Quarter-final	St Finbarr's	6-11 - 0-19	Castlehaven	Clonakilty GAA Complex
	S Sherlock 3-3 (2-0 pen, 1 2pt f, 0-1 45), I Maguire 1-1, W Buckley, C Dennehy 1-0 each, B Hayes, R Barrett 0-2 each, J Burns, E McGreevy, J Wigginton-Barrett 0-1 each.	Report	B Hurley 0-9 (1 2pt, 1 2pt f, 0-2 f), M Hurley 0-4, C Cahalane, J Cahalane 0-2 each, M Collins, A Whelton 0-1 each.

28 September 2025 Quarter-final	Newcestown	0-18 - 0-18; Penalties: 4-3	Carrigaline	Páirc Uí Rinn
	D Buckley (0-9, 0-4 2pt free, 0-4 frees), S O’Sullivan R O’Sullivan and L Meade (0-2 each), J Meade, N Kelly and D McAree (0-1 each)	Report	K O’Reilly (0-6, 0-1 free), N Coakley (0-5, 0-2 2pt) E Desmond (0-2 frees) and B Coakley (0-1 ’45) (0-3 each), B O’Driscoll (0-1).

28 September 2025 Quarter-final	Ballincollig	1-15 - 2-11	Duhallow	Páirc Uí Rinn
	D O’Mahony 1-2 (1-0 penalty), D O’Leary 0-3, P O’Neill, L O’Connell 0-2 each, L Fahy, S Kiely, B O’Connell, T O’Connell, D Dorgan, S O’Neill 0-1 each.	Report	L Murphy 1-3 (0-1 f), Donncha O’Connor 0-4 (1 2pt, 0-2 f), A Carroll 1-0, David O’Connor 0-2, J Curtin, C O’Callaghan 0-1 each.

=== Semi-finals ===
12 October 2025 Semi-final	Nemo Rangers	2-14 - 0-19	Newcestown	SuperValu Páirc Uí Chaoimh
	M Cronin 0-9 (0-4 f, 1 2pt), K Fulignati 1-1, K Histon 1-0, C Horgan 0-2, B Cripps, L Horgan 0-1 each.	Report	D Buckley 0-9 (2 2pt, 0-3 f, 1 2ptf), C Dinneen (1 2pt), L Meade 0-3 each, S O’Donovan, T Twomey, J Meade, C Keane 0-1 each.

12 October 2025 Semi-final	St Finbarr's	2-13 - 1-10	Ballincollig	SuperValu Páirc Uí Chaoimh
	S Sherlock 1-9 (2 2pt, 0-4 f), B Hayes 1-1 (0-1 m), W Buckley, L Hannigan, C Dennehy 0-1 each.	Report	D O’Leary 1-0, B O’Connell, S Kiely, L Fahy 0-2 each, D Dorgan (f), T O’Connell, S O’Neill, P O’Neill 0-1 each.

=== Final ===
26 October 2025 Final	Nemo Rangers	1-13 - 1-14	St Finbarr's	SuperValu Páirc Uí Chaoimh
	M Cronin 0-5 (0-2 f), K O’Donovan 1-1, B Hayes 0-3 (1 2pt), C Horgan 0-2 (1 2pt), M Hill, S Cronin 0-1 each.	Report	S Sherlock 0-5 (1 2pt f, 0-1 f), B Hayes 1-2 (1 2pt), E Twomey, W Buckley 0-2 each, C Dennehy, C Myers-Murray, R Barrett 0-1 each.	Referee: C Lane (Banteer)

== Championship statistics ==
=== Top scorers ===
Overall

Rank	Player	Club	Tally	Total	Matches	Average
1	Steven Sherlock	St Finbarr's	6-41	59	6	9.83
2	David Buckley	Newcestown	0-46	46	5	9.20
3	Mark Cronin	Nemo Rangers	1-35	38	5	7.60
4	Fiachra Lynch	Valley Rovers	1-26	29	5	5.80
5	Luke Murphy	Duhallow	3-16	25	3	8.33
6	Bryan Hayes	Nemo Rangers	2-14	20	5	4.00
7	Brian Hurley	Castlehaven	0-19	19	3	6.66
8	Cian Dorgan	Ballincollig	1-15	18	4	4.50
9	Chris Óg Jones	Muskerry	3-07	16	2	8.00
9	John O'Rourke	Carbery Rangers	1-13	16	5	5.20
9	Niall Coakley	Carrigaline	1-13	16	4	4.00

Single game

Rank	Player	Club	Tally	Total	Opposition
1	Steven Sherlock	St Finbarr's	1-14	17	Carrigaline
2	Chris Óg Jones	Muskerry	3-03	12	Carbery
2	Steven Sherlock	St Finbarr's	3-03	12	Castlehaven
2	Steven Sherlock	St Finbarr's	1-09	12	Ballincollig
2	Fiachra Lynch	Valley Rovers	1-09	12	Carbery Rangers
2	David Buckley	Newcestown	0-12	12	Valley Rovers
7	David Buckley	Newcestown	0-11	11	Mallow
8	Mark Cronin	Nemo Rangers	1-07	10	St Michael's
8	Luke Murphy	Duhallow	1-07	10	UCC
10	Cian Dorgan	Ballincollig	1-06	9	Douglas
10	Luke Murphy	Duhallow	1-06	9	Muskerry
10	Brian Hurley	Castlehaven	0-09	9	Valley Rovers
10	Brian Hurley	Castlehaven	0-09	9	St Finbarr's
10	David Buckley	Newcestown	0-09	9	Carrigaline
10	Mark Cronin	Nemo Rangers	0-09	9	Newcestown
10	David Buckley	Newcestown	0-09	9	Nemo Rangers

=== Miscellaneous ===
- St Finbarr's beat Nemo Rangers in the final for the very first time.
