= 2024 Cork Premier Senior Football Championship =

Annual Gaelic football competition season

- Dates: 13 June - 27 October 2024
- Teams: 12 clubs 4 divisions 1 university
- Sponsor: McCarthy Insurance Group
- Champions: Castlehaven (7th title); Mark Collins (captain); Seánie Cahalane (manager)
- Runners-up: Nemo Rangers; Alan O'Donovan (captain); Robbie O'Dwyer (manager)
- Relegated: Éire Óg

Tournament statistics
- Matches played: 28
- Goals scored: 58 (2.07 per match)
- Points scored: 648 (23.14 per match)
- Top scorer(s): Steven Sherlock (4-32)

The 2024 Cork Premier Senior Football Championship was the fifth staging of the Cork Premier Senior Football Championship and the 136th staging overall of a championship for the top-ranking Gaelic football teams in Cork. The draw for the group stage placings took place on 14 December 2023. The championship ran from 13 June to 27 October 2024.

Castlehaven were the defending champions.

The final was played on 27 October 2024 at SuperValu Páirc Uí Chaoimh in Cork, between Castlehaven and Nemo Rangers, in what was their fifth meeting in the final overall and a second consecutive meeting in the final. Castlehaven won the match by 0-16 to 0-11 to claim their seventh championship title overall and a second consecutive title.

Steven Sherlock was the championship's top scorer with 4-32.

== Team changes ==
=== To Championship ===
Promoted from the Cork Senior A Football Championship

- Newcestown

=== From Championship ===
Relegated to the Cork Senior A Football Championship

- Carrigaline

== Participating teams ==
=== Clubs ===
Team	Location	Colours	Manager	Captain
Ballincollig	Ballincollig	Green and white	Podsie O'Mahony	Luke Fahy
Carbery Rangers	Rosscarbery	Green, white and gold	Séamus Hayes	Paul Shanahan
Castlehaven	Castlehaven	Blue and white	Seánie Cahalane	Mark Collins
Clonakilty	Clonakilty	Green and red	Martin O'Brien	Mark White
Douglas	Douglas	Green, white and black	Brian Collins	Darragh Kelly
Éire Óg	Ovens	Red and yellow	Paudie Kissane	Daire McCarthy
Mallow	Mallow	Red and yellow	Andrew Cashman	Mattie Taylor
Nemo Rangers	Trabeg	Black and green	Robbie O'Dwyer	Alan O'Donovan
Newcestown	Newcestown	Red and yellow	Jim O'Sullivan	Luke Meade
St Finbarr's	Togher	Blue and yellow	Brian Roche	Ian Maguire
St Michael's	Blackrock	Green and yellow	Pat Doyle	Andrew Murphy
Valley Rovers	Innishannon	Green and white	Denis Kiely	Darragh Murphy

=== Divisions and colleges ===
Team	Location	Colours	Manager	Captain(s)
Avondhu	North Cork	Black and yellow		
Carbery	West Cork	Purple and yellow	Colm Aherne	
Duhallow	Duhallow	Orange and black	Éamonn Moynihan	Kevin Cremin; Donncha O'Connor
Muskerry	Mid Cork	Green and white	Joint team	Eoghan Lehane
University College Cork	College Road	Red and black		

== Group A ==
=== Group A table ===
Quarter-finalists Relegation playoff

Team	Matches				Score			Pts
Team	Pld	W	D	L	For	Against	Diff	Pts
Nemo Rangers	3	3	0	0	44	29	15	6
Ballincollig	3	2	0	1	29	26	3	4
Newcestown	3	1	0	2	31	36	-5	2
Éire Óg	3	0	0	3	29	42	-13	0

=== Group A results ===
26 July 2024 Round 1	Nemo Rangers	0-11 - 0-06	Ballincollig	Ballinora Grounds
	M Cronin 0-3 (0-2 f), P Kerrigan (f), R Corkery 0-2 each, K O’Donovan, C McCartan, K Fulignati, S Cronin 0-1 each.	Report	C Dorgan (45), S O’Neill 0-2 each, L Fahy, D O’Mahony 0-1 each.

26 July 2024 Round 1	Newcestown	0-12 - 0-10	Éire Óg	Cloughduv Grounds
	D Buckley 0-4 (0-2 f), L Meade 0-3, R O’Sullivan 0-2, N Kelly, J Meade, S O’Sullivan 0-1 each.	Report	D Goulding (0-2 f), E O’Shea 0-3 each, C McGoldrick 0-2, R O’Flynn, C Kelly (f) 0-1 each.

16 August 2024 Round 2	Éire Óg	2-06 - 0-16	Nemo Rangers	Ballincollig Grounds
	E O'Shea 1-1, C McGoldrick 1-0, D Healy (f), D Kelly, C Kelly (f), J Murphy, J Sheehan 0-1 each.	Report	C Horgan, R Corkery 0-4 each, P Kerrigan 0-3 (0-1 f), M Cronin 0-2, O Whyte, R Dalton, K O'Donovan 0-1 each.

17 August 2024 Round 2	Ballincollig	0-09 - 0-08	Newcestown	Ovens Grounds
	C Dorgan 0-6 (0-4f), L Fahy, S Kiely, D O’Mahony 0-1 each.	Report	D Buckley 0-5 (0-4f), N Kelly, S O’Sullivan, J Kelleher 0-1 each.

15 September 2024 Round 3	Nemo Rangers	2-11 - 0-11	Newcestown	Cloughduv Grounds
	M Cronin (0-5, 1f); B Hayes (1-0), B Cripps (1-0), P Kerrigan (0-3), E Nation (0-1), R Corkery (0-1), A O’Donovan (0-1).	Report	C Keane (0-3); D Buckley (0-2, 1'45), R O’Sullivan (0-2, 2f), M McSweeney (0-1), L Meade (0-1), O Walsh (0-1), S O’Donovan (0-1).

15 September 2024 Round 3	Ballincollig	2-08 - 0-07	Éire Óg	Jack Fitzgerald Memorial Park
	C Dorgan 1-4 (1-0 pen, 0-2 f), S Kiely 1-0, F Down, L Fahy, S Dore, B Keating, 0-1 each.	Report	D Goulding 0-2 f, C Kelly (f), C Clifford, C O’Callaghan, D Kelly, D Foley 0-1 each.

== Group B ==
=== Group B table ===
Semi-finalists Quarter-finalists Relegation playoff

Team	Matches				Score			Pts
Team	Pld	W	D	L	For	Against	Diff	Pts
Castlehaven	3	3	0	0	59	29	30	6
Clonakilty	3	1	1	1	51	42	9	3
St Michael's	3	1	0	2	25	46	-31	2
Carbery Rangers	3	0	1	2	29	37	-8	1

=== Group B results ===
27 July 2024 Round 1	Castlehaven	1-18 - 1-12	Clonakilty	Rosscarbery Grounds
	J Cahalane 1-3, B Hurley 0-5 (0-3 f), M Hurley 0-4, T O’Mahoney, A Whelton, J O’Driscoll, S Browne, M Collins (f), C Maguire 0-1 each.	Report	R Mannix 1-2, C Daly 0-4 (0-3 f), B White (f), D Gough (f), D Lowney, B Ridgeway, N Barrett, S Murphy 0-1 each.

27 July 2024 Round 1	Carbery Rangers	0-08 - 1-08	St Michael's	Brinny Grounds
	M Hodnett (0-3, all frees), J O’Riordan, B Hodnett, P O’Rourke, J O’Rourke (free) and K Scannell (0-1 each).	Report	L O’Herlihy (0-4, 0-2 frees), K Hegarty (0-2), F Leahy (1-0), R Kavanagh and R O’Shaughnessy (0-1 each).

16 August 2024 Round 2	St Michael's	0-05 - 2-18	Castlehaven	Clonakilty Grounds
	L O’Herlihy 0-2, A O’Callaghan, E Buckley, D Meaney 0-1 each.	Report	B Hurley 0-5 (0-3 f), J Cahalane 1-2, M Maguire 1-0, S Browne, R Minihane, C Maguire 0-2 each, J Walsh, J O’Neill, A Whelton, C Nolan, C O’Driscoll 0-1 each.

18 August 2024 Round 2	Clonakilty	1-09 - 0-12	Carbery Rangers	Sam Maguire Park
	D Gough 1-3 (0-1f), S White, C Daly 0-2 each, C Kenneally, F Murphy 0-1 each.	Report	J O’Rourke 0-5 (0-3f), D Hayes, B Hodnett 0-2 each, Jerry O’Riordan, P O’Rourke, P Shanahan (0-1f) 0-1 each.

15 September 2024 Round 3	Castlehaven	0-14 - 0-09	Carbery Rangers	Leap Grounds
	R Maguire 0-4, B Hurley (0-2 f), J Cahalane 0-3 each, M Maguire 0-2, J O’Neill, M Collins 0-1 each.	Report	J O’Rourke 0-4 (0-2 f), J O’Riordan 0-2, P Hurley, B Hodnett, J Hodnett 0-1 each.

15 September 2024 Round 3	Clonakilty	2-18 - 1-06	St Michael's	Charlie Hurley Park
	D Gough 1-5 (0-3 f), C Daly 0-7 (0-3 f), M Shanley 1-2, B Ridgeway, S McEvoy, G Wharton, N Barrett (0-1 m) 0-1 each.	Report	E Buckley 1-0, L O’Herlihy 0-2 f, A Murphy, A Hennessy, R O’Shaughnessy, E Hegarty 0-1 each.

== Group C ==
=== Group C table ===
Quarter-finalists

Team	Matches				Score			Pts
Team	Pld	W	D	L	For	Against	Diff	Pts
St Finbarr's	3	2	0	1	53	39	14	4
Mallow	3	1	1	1	42	45	-3	3
Valley Rovers	3	1	1	1	34	46	-12	3
Douglas	3	1	0	2	31	30	1	2

=== Group C results ===
26 July 2024 Round 1	St Finbarr's	1-10 - 0-10	Douglas	Carrigaline Grounds
	S Sherlock 1-4 (0-4f), J Wigginton Barrett, I Maguire, W Buckley, C Scully, C Myers Murray, E Denney 0-1 each.	Report	A Cotter (f), P Lucey (0-1f) 0-2 each, A O’Hare (f), S Aherne, B Lynch, C Kingston, S Powter, R Hanley 0-1 each.

26 July 2024 Round 1	Valley Rovers	1-12 - 1-12	Mallow	Glenville Grounds
	F Lynch 0-4 (0-3 f), A Kenneally 1-0, D Murphy 0-2, C McCarthy, A Walsh Murphy (f), E O’Sullivan (f), J Kiely, E Delaney, D Muckian 0-1 each.	Report	S Hayes 1-2 (0-2 m), M Tobin 0-4, S McDonnell 0-3 (0-1f), D Moynihan, S O’Callaghan, J Dillon 0-1 each.

16 August 2024 Round 2	Douglas	0-07 - 0-08	Valley Rovers	Carrigaline Grounds
	C Joyce 0-4 f, B Hartnett 0-2, C Kingston 0-1.	Report	C McCarthy 0-3, E O’Sullivan (f), F Lynch (f), A Walsh Murphy, G Farrell, D Murphy 0-1 each.

17 August 2024 Round 2	Mallow	2-12 - 2-10	St Finbarr's	Grenagh Grounds
	S McDonnell 1-6 (0-5 f), J Dillon 1-0, M Taylor, K Sheehan 0-2 each, M Tobin (f), P Hennessy 0-1 each.	Report	S Sherlock 1-7 (0-4 f, 0-1 m), C Scully 1-0, W Buckley, E McGreevy, C Myers-Murray 0-1 each.

15 September 2024 Round 3	Mallow	0-09 - 0-14	Douglas	Grenagh Grounds
	S McDonnell 0-3 (0-2 f), J Dillon 0-2, S Copps, R Harkin, M Tobin (f), K Sheehan 0-1 each.	Report	S Kingston 0-5 (0-4 f), C Joyce, B Hartnett 0-3 each, S Powter, A Sheehy, P Lucey 0-1 each.

15 September 2024 Round 3	St Finbarr's	4-12 - 0-11	Valley Rovers	Coachford Sportsfield
	S Sherlock 2-5 (0-3 f), B Hayes, E Dennehy 1-0 each, C Myers-Murray, J Wigginton-Barrett 0-2 each, E McGreevy, W Buckley, B O'Connell 0-1 each.	Report	C McCarthy 0-4 (0-1 m), A Walsh-Murphy (0-2 f), F Lynch (0-1 f) 0-2 each, E O’Sullivan (f), J Kiely, W Hurley 0-1 each.

== Division/colleges section ==
=== Division/colleges unseeded section final ===
13 June 2024 Final	Muskerry	3-16 - 3-13	Avondhu	Glenville Grounds
	E Myers 2-5 (1-0 pen, 0-3 f), L Wall 1-1, L O’Connor 0-3 (0-1 f), L Twohig, D Kelly, A Quinn 0-2 each, J O’Donoghue 0-1.	Report	M Lenahan 1-7 (0-4 f), E Birchill 1-1, D Hanlon (f), S Walsh 0-2 each, G Roche 1-0, K Kiely 0-1.	Referee: E Coleman (Youghal)

=== Division/colleges seeded section semi-finals ===
- Carbery, Duhallow and University College Cork received byes to this stage.

9 August 2024 Semi-final	Carbery	1-14 - 1-15	Muskerry	Ovens Grounds
	D Gore (0-1f), D Mac Eoin (0-2f) 0-5 each, O Corcoran 0-3, S Daly 1-0, Keith O’Driscoll 0-1.	Report	C Óg Jones 0-5, L Twohig 0-4 (0-2f), L O’Connor 0-3 (0-1f), E O’Leary 1-0, I Jones, L Wall, J Creedon (f) 0-1 each.

9 August 2024 Semi-final	Duhallow	4-13 - 1-12	University College Cork	Mallow GAA Complex
	David O’Connor 2-2, L Murphy 1-3, G O’Sullivan, Seamus Hickey 0-3 each, J Curtin 1-0, Shane Hickey, J Linehan 0-1 each.	Report	R Quirke 1-4 (0-1 45), C O’Mahony 0-3 (0-2 f), D Phelan 0-2 (0-1 f), S Ahern (f), T Cunningham, D McMahon 0-1 each.

=== Division/colleges seeded section final ===
30 August 2024 Final	Muskerry	3-13 - 2-15	Duhallow	Castle Grounds
	C Óg Jones (1-4), L Twohig (1-2, 0-2 frees), I Jones (1-1), L O’Connor (0-3, 0-2 frees), A O’Sullivan, J O’Mullane and J Kelleher (0-1 each).	Report	L Murphy (1-4), K Cremin (1-0), D Cashman (0-3), Donncha O’Connor (frees) and G O’Sullivan (0-2 each), Séamus Hickey, C Curtin, C Walsh and J Curtin (0-1).

== Knockout stage ==
=== Bracket ===
Quarter-Finals
Ballincollig	2-10
St Finbarr's	2-15
Mallow	3-15
Muskerry	2-11
Nemo Rangers	0-19
Clonakilty	2-13

Semi-Finals
Castlehavan	0-18
St Finbarr's	0-14
Mallow	1-05
Nemo Rangers	2-11

Final
Castlehavan	0-16
Nemo Rangers	0-11

=== Relegation playoff ===
12 October 2024 Playoff	Carbery Rangers	1-11 - 2-06	Éire Óg	St Mary's Park
	J O’Rourke 0-4 (0-1 f), Paul Hodnett 1-0, P Shanahan 0-3 (0-2 f, 0-1 45’, Peadar O’Rourke 0-2, P Hurley, B Hodnett 0-1 each.	Report	D Dineen, D Healy 1-0 each, D Goulding 0-2 (0-1 f), C Clifford, R O’Flynn, C O’Callaghan, J Cooper 0-1 each.

=== Quarter-finals ===
27 September 2024 Quarter-final	Ballincollig	2-10 - 2-15	St Finbarr's	Páirc Uí Rinn
	C Dorgan 0-7 (0-2 f), S Kiely, D Dorgan 1-0 each, S O’Neill, T O’Connell, P O’Neill 0-1 each.	Report	S Sherlock 0-10 (0-8 f, 0-1 45), J Wigginton-Barrett, B Hayes 1-2 each, E Twomey 0-1.

6 October 2024 Quarter-final	Muskerry	2-11 - 3-15	Mallow	Kanturk Grounds
	C Óg Jones 1-2 (0-1 f), L O’Connor 0-5 (0-3 f), M McLoughlin 1-0 I Jones, J Creedon (f), L Wall, E O’Leary 0-1 each.	Report	K Sheehan 2-1; M Tobin 1-4, S McDonnell 0-6 (0-4 f), J Dillon 0-2 (0-1 45), M Taylor, M Kelleher 0-1 each.

6 October 2024 Quarter-final	Nemo Rangers	0-19 - 2-13; Penalties: 5-4	Clonakilty	Charlie Hurley Park
	P Kerrigan 0-6 (0-4 f), M Cronin 0-4 (0-2 f, 0-1 45), C Horgan 0-3 (0-1 m), J Horgan 0-2, B Cripps, R Dalton, R Corkery, B Hayes 0-1 each.	Report	C Daly 1-7 (0-2 f, 0-2 m, 0-1 45), R Mannix 1-3, B White 0-2 (0-1 f), D Gough 0-1 f.

=== Semi-finals ===
13 October 2024 Semi-final	Mallow	1-05 - 2-11	Nemo Rangers	SuperValu Páirc Uí Chaoimh
	S McDonnell (1-1, 0-1 free), S Hayes (0-2), K Sheehan and M Tobin (0-1 each)	Report	P Kerrigan (1-5, 0-3 frees), M Cronin (1-3), R Dalton (0-2), B Murphy (0-1)

13 October 2024 Semi-final	Castlehaven	0-18 - 0-14	St Finbarr's	SuperValu Páirc Uí Chaoimh
	B Hurley (0-11, 0-3 frees, 0-1 mark); J Cahalane (0-3); C Maguire (0-2); A Whelton, S Browne (0-1 each).	Report	S Sherlock (0-6, 0-3 frees); E Twomey (0-3); B Hayes (0-2); J Wigginton Barrett, C Myers Murray (0-1).

=== Final ===
27 October 2024 Final	Nemo Rangers	0-11 - 0-16	Castlehaven	SuperValu Páirc Uí Chaoimh
	R Dalton 0-3, P Kerrigan (0-1 f), M Cronin (0-1 f), B Hayes 0-2 each, C Horgan, K Fulignati 0-1 each.	Report	B Hurley (0-3 f), M Hurley 0-4 each, J Cahalane 0-3, C Cahalane, R Maguire, C O’Driscoll, M Maguire, S Browne 0-1 each.	Referee: J Regan (Lough Rovers)

== Championship statistics ==
=== Top scorers ===
Overall

Rank	Player	Club	Tally	Total	Matches	Average
1	Steven Sherlock	St Finbarr's	4-32	44	5	8.80
2	Brian Hurley	Castlehaven	0-28	28	5	5.00
3	Seán McDonnell	Mallow	2-19	25	5	5.00
4	Paul Kerrigan	Nemo Rangers	1-21	24	6	4.00
5	Conor Daly	Clonakilty	1-20	23	4	5.75
6	Cian Dorgan	Ballincollig	1-19	22	4	5.50
6	Mark Cronin	Nemo Rangers	1-19	22	6	3.66
8	Jack Cahalane	Castlehaven	2-14	20	5	4.00
9	Chris Óg Jones	Muskerry	2-11	17	3	5.66
10	Darragh Gough	Clonakilty	2-10	16	4	4.00

Single game

Rank	Player	Club	Tally	Total	Opposition
1	Ed Myers	Muskerry	2-05	11	Avondhu
1	Steven Sherlock	St Finbarr's	2-05	11	Valley Rovers
1	Brian Hurley	Castlehaven	0-11	11	St Finbarr's
4	Mark Lenahan	Avondhu	1-07	10	Muskerry
4	Conor Daly	Clonakilty	1-07	10	Nemo Rangers
4	Steven Sherlock	St Finbarr's	1-07	10	Mallow
4	Steven Sherlock	St Finbarr's	0-10	10	Ballincollig
8	Seán McDonnell	Mallow	1-06	9	St Finbarr's
9	David O'Connor	Duhallow	2-02	8	UCC
9	Darragh Gough	Clonakilty	1-05	8	St Michael's
9	Paul Kerrigan	Nemo Rangers	1-05	8	Mallow
