= Ian Maguire =

Irish Gaelic footballer

Personal information
- Native name: Iain Mag Uidhir (Irish)
- Born: 19 April 1994 (age 32) Cork, Ireland
- Occupation: Accountant
- Height: 6 ft 4 in (193 cm)

Sport
- Sport: Gaelic football
- Position: Midfield
Club
Years	Club	Apps (scores)
2012-present	St Finbarr's	64 (7-32)
Club titles
- Cork titles: 3
- Munster titles: 1
College
- Years: College
- 2012-2017: University College Cork
College titles
- Sigerson titles: 1
Inter-county*
Years	County	Apps (scores)
2014-present	Cork	44 (2-11)
Inter-county titles
- Munster titles: 0
- All-Irelands: 0
- NFL: 0
- All Stars: 0
- *Inter County team apps and scores correct as of 22:20, 22 February 2026.

Ian Maguire (born 19 April 1994) is an Irish Gaelic footballer who plays for Cork Senior Championship club St Finbarr's and at senior level with the Cork county team. He usually lines out as at midfield.

== Career ==
Maguire first came to Gaelic football prominence at juvenile and underage levels with the St Finbarr's club while also lining out with Coláiste an Spioraid Naoimh in the Corn Uí Mhuirí. After making his senior team debut, he was captain of the club's Munster Club Championship-winning team in 2022. Maguire first appeared on the inter-county scene as a member of the Cork minor football team in 2012 before later lining out in the 2013 All-Ireland under-21 final defeat by Galway. He made his first appearance with the Cork senior football team in a Round 4 qualifier against Sligo in 2014.

== Career statistics ==
=== Club ===
As of match played 7 December 2025.

Team	Season	Cork		Munster		All-Ireland		Total	
Team	Season	Apps	Score	Apps	Score	Apps	Score	Apps	Score
St Finbarr's	2012	2	0-02	—		—		2	0-02
St Finbarr's	2013	2	0-02	—		—		2	0-02
St Finbarr's	2014	3	0-00	—		—		3	0-00
St Finbarr's	2015	0	0-00	—		—		0	0-00
St Finbarr's	2016	3	1-01	—		—		3	1-01
St Finbarr's	2017	8	1-03	—		—		8	1-03
St Finbarr's	2018	5	1-05	1	0-01	—		6	1-06
St Finbarr's	2019	3	0-03	—		—		3	0-03
St Finbarr's	2020	5	0-01	—		—		5	0-01
St Finbarr's	2021	6	0-05	2	0-00	1	0-00	9	0-05
St Finbarr's	2022	5	1-02	—		—		5	1-02
St Finbarr's	2023	4	2-02	—		—		4	2-02
St Finbarr's	2024	5	0-01	—		—		5	0-01
St Finbarr's	2025	6	1-03	3	0-01	—		9	1-04
Career total		57	7-30	6	0-02	1	0-00	64	7-32

=== Inter-county ===
As of 22 February 2026

Team	Year	National League			Munster		All-Ireland		Total	
Team	Year	Division	Apps	Score	Apps	Score	Apps	Score	Apps	Score
Cork	2014	Division 1	0	0-00	0	0-00	2	0-01	2	0-01
Cork	2015	Division 1	2	0-00	0	0-00	0	0-00	2	0-00
Cork	2016	Division 1	7	0-01	1	0-00	3	1-00	11	1-01
Cork	2017	Division 2	6	0-00	3	0-01	1	0-00	10	0-01
Cork	2018	Division 2	7	0-01	2	0-00	1	0-00	10	0-01
Cork	2019	Division 2	7	1-00	2	0-01	4	0-00	13	1-01
Cork	2020	Division 3	6	1-02	2	0-00	—		8	1-02
Cork	2021	Division 2	4	0-04	2	0-02	—		6	0-06
Cork	2022	Division 2	5	0-01	1	0-00	3	0-00	9	0-01
Cork	2023	Division 2	7	1-01	1	0-00	5	0-02	13	1-03
Cork	2024	Division 2	7	0-03	2	1-00	3	0-00	12	1-03
Cork	2025	Division 2	5	0-02	2	0-01	4	0-03	11	0-06
Cork	2026	Division 2	4	0-01	0	0-00	0	0-00	4	0-01
Total			67	3-16	18	1-05	26	1-06	111	5-27

== Honours ==
University College Cork

- Sigerson Cup: 2014

St Finbarr's

- Munster Senior Club Football Championship: 2021 (c)
- Cork Premier Senior Football Championship: 2018, 2021 (c), 2025
- Kelleher Shield: 2019
- Cork Minor Football Championship: 2012

Cork

- National Football League Division 3: 2020
- Munster Under-21 Football Championship: 2013, 2014

Sporting positions
Preceded by Paul Kerrigan	Cork Senior Football Captain; 2018-2021	Succeeded by Seán Meehan; Brian Hurley
