= Mark Cronin (Gaelic footballer) =

Irish Gaelic footballer

Personal information
- Native name: Marc Ó Cróinín (Irish)
- Born: 2000 (age 25–26) Cork, Ireland
- Occupation: Student

Sport
- Sport: Gaelic Football
- Position: Right corner-forward
Club
Years	Club	Apps (scores)
2018-present	Nemo Rangers	41 (8-110)
Club titles
- Cork titles: 3
- Munster titles: 1
College
- Years: College
- University College Cork
College titles
- Sigerson titles: 0
Inter-county*
Years	County	Apps (scores)
2022-	Cork	0 (0-00)
Inter-county titles
- Munster titles: 0
- All-Irelands: 0
- NFL: 0
- All Stars: 0
- *Inter County team apps and scores correct as of 20:42, 29 January 2022.

Mark Cronin (born 2000) is an Irish Gaelic footballer who plays at club level with Nemo Rangers and at inter-county level with the Cork senior football team. He usually lines out as a forward.

== Career ==
Cronin first played competitive Gaelic football with the Nemo Rangers club in Cork. After progressing onto the club's senior team in 2018, he has since gone on to win a Munster Club Championship title and three Cork PSFC titles. Cronin first appeared on the inter-county scene as a member of the Cork minor football team in 2017. He progressed onto the under-20 team and was at right corner-forward when Cork beat Dublin in the 2019 All-Ireland under-20 final. Cronin was first selected for the Cork senior football team for the pre-season McGrath Cup competition in 2022. He later earned inclusion on the team's National League panel.

== Career statistics ==
=== Club ===
As of 26 October 2025

Team	Season	Cork		Munster		All-Ireland		Total	
Team	Season	Apps	Score	Apps	Score	Apps	Score	Apps	Score
Nemo Rangers	2018	3	1-00	—		—		3	1-00
Nemo Rangers	2019	5	0-10	3	0-06	1	0-00	9	0-16
Nemo Rangers	2020	5	2-12	—		—		5	2-12
Nemo Rangers	2021	0	0-00	—		—		0	0-00
Nemo Rangers	2022	6	1-09	1	1-02	—		7	2-11
Nemo Rangers	2023	6	1-17	—		—		6	1-17
Nemo Rangers	2024	6	1-19	—		—		6	1-19
Nemo Rangers	2025	5	1-35	—		—		5	1-35
Career total		36	7-102	4	1-08	1	0-00	41	8-110

=== Inter-county ===
As of match played 29 January 2022.

Team	Year	National League			Munster		All-Ireland		Total	
Team	Year	Division	Apps	Score	Apps	Score	Apps	Score	Apps	Score
Cork	2022	Division 2	0	0-00	0	0-00	0	0-00	0	0-00
Total			0	0-00	0	0-00	0	0-00	0	0-00

== Honours ==
Nemo Rangers

- Munster Senior Club Football Championship: 2019
- Cork Premier Senior Football Championship: 2019, 2020, 2022

Cork

- All-Ireland Under-20 Football Championship: 2019
- Munster Under-20 Football Championship: 2019
