= Vincent Cronin (Gaelic footballer) =

Irish Gaelic footballer

Personal information
- Native name: Uinseann Ó Cróinín (Irish)
- Nickname: Vincie
- Born: 1943 (age 82–83) Togher, Cork, Ireland

Sport
- Sport: Gaelic football
- Position: Left corner-back
Club
- Years: Club
- St Finbarr's
Club titles
- Cork titles: 0
Inter-county*
Years	County	Apps (scores)
1963	Cork	1 (0-00)
Inter-county titles
- Munster titles: 0
- All-Irelands: 0
- NFL: 0
- *Inter County team apps and scores correct as of 23:33, 14 July 2014.

Vincent Cronin (born 1943) was an Irish Gaelic footballer who played as a left corner-back at senior level for the Cork county team.

Born in Togher, Cork, Cronin first played competitive football in his youth. He arrived on the inter-county scene at the age of seventeen when he first linked up with the Cork minor team, before later joining the under-21 side. He made his senior debut during the 1963 championship and played championship football for just one season. He was a Munster runner-up on one occasion.

At club level, Cronin played with St Finbarr's.

Throughout his inter-county career, Cronin made just one championship appearance for Cork.

== Honours ==
Cork

- All-Ireland Minor Football Championship (1): 1961
- Munster Minor Football Championship (2): 1960, 1961
