= Tadhg Crowley Cup =

Annual Gaelic football competition

- Current season or competition: 2024 Tadhg Crowley Cup
- Irish: Corn Tadhg Ó Crualaoich
- Code: Gaelic football
- Founded: 2022; 3 years ago
- Region: Cork (GAA)
- Trophy: Tadhg Crowley Cup
- No. of teams: 6
- Title holders: Muskerry (1st title)
- Sponsors: Bon Secours Hospital
- Official website: Cork GAA

The Tadhg Crowley Cup is an annual Gaelic football competition organised by the Cork County Board of the Gaelic Athletic Association and contested by divisional and university sides in the county of Cork in Ireland, deciding the competition winners through a double-elimination format.

Muskerry are the reigning champions, having beaten Duhallow by 3–13 to 2–15 in the 2024 final.

== History ==
A restructuring process of the entire Cork football championship system had been underway since voted on by Cork County Board delegates in March 2019. From 2020, the participating divisions and colleges held their own series of games, designed to produce one team to advance to the quarter-final stages of the championship proper. In 2022, it was decided to award the Tadhg Crowley Cup to the winning team.

== Qualification for subsequent competitions ==
The Tadhg Crowley Cup winners qualify for the quarter-final stage of the Cork Premier Senior Football Championship.

== Managers ==
Managers in the Tadhg Crowley Cup are involved in the day-to-day running of the team, including the training, team selection, and sourcing of players. Their influence varies from team to team. The manager is assisted by a team of two or three selectors and a backroom team consisting of various coaches.

Winning managers
Manager	Team	Wins	Winning years
Tim Buckley	Carbery	1	2022
Ger O'Sullivan	Duhallow	1	2023
Joint team	Muskerry	1	2024

== Trophy ==
The winning team is presented with the Tadhg Crowley Cup. Tadhgo Crowley won seven Cork SFC titles with Clonakilty as well as captaining the Cork senior team to the 1945 All-Ireland Championship title.

== List of finals ==
Year	Winners		Runners-up		Winning captains(s)	Venue	#
Year	Club	Score	Club	Score	Winning captains(s)	Venue	#
2022	Carbery	0-16	Duhallow	0-15	Colm O'Driscoll	Páirc Uí Rinn	
2023	Duhallow	2-14	University College Cork	0-14	Donncha O'Connor; Shane Curtin	Páirc Uí Rinn	
2024	Muskerry	3-13	Duhallow	2-15	Eoghan Lehane	Castle Grounds	
