= Steven Sherlock =

Irish Gaelic footballer

Personal information
- Native name: Stiofán Scorlóg (Irish)
- Born: 28 March 1997 (age 29) Cork, Ireland
- Occupation: Sales rep
- Height: 6 ft 0 in (183 cm)

Sport
- Sport: Gaelic football
- Position: Left corner-forward
Club*
Years	Club	Apps (scores)
2015-present	St Finbarr's	56 (25-384)
Club titles
- Cork titles: 3
- Munster titles: 1
Inter-county**
Years	County	Apps (scores)
2018-present	Cork	28 (1-109)
Inter-county titles
- Munster titles: 0
- All-Irelands: 0
- NFL: 0
- All Stars: 0
- * club appearances and scores correct as of 20:09, 9 December 2025. **Inter County team apps and scores correct as of 22:43, 27 June 2026.

Steven Sherlock (born 28 March 1997) is an Irish Gaelic footballer. At club level, he plays with St Finbarr's and at inter-county level with the Cork senior football team.

== Career ==
Sherlock attended Coláiste an Spioraid Naoimh in Bishopstown and played in all grades of Gaelic football during his time there. At club level, he first played for St Finbarr's at juvenile and underage levels. Sherlock won a Rebel Óg Premier 1 MFC title in 2015, after scoring 0–06 in the 1–09 to 0–08 win over Douglas in the final.

Sherlock was still eligible for the minor grade when he made his St Finbarr's senior team debut in 2015. He won his first Cork SFC medal in 2018, before claiming further titles in 2021 and 2025. Sherlock was also the championship's top scorer in each of those title-winning years, while also winning a Munster Club SFC medal in 2021. He was included on the Club Team of the Year in 2021 and 2026.

At inter-county level, Sherlock first played for Cork as a member of the minor team in 2015. He immediately progressed to the under-21 team and was a substitute for Cork's 5–07 to 1–14 defeat by Mayo in the 2016 All-Ireland U21FC final. Sherlock made his senior team debut in 2018, but was among a small cohort of players cut from manager Ronan McCarthy's squad at the end of 2019. He returned to the team in 2022, opted out for 2025 but returned to the team in 2026.

== Career statistics ==
=== Club ===
As of match played 7 December 2025.

Team	Season	Cork		Munster		All-Ireland		Total	
Team	Season	Apps	Score	Apps	Score	Apps	Score	Apps	Score
St Finbarr's	2015	2	0-02	—		—		2	0-02
St Finbarr's	2016	3	0-29	—		—		3	0-29
St Finbarr's	2017	7	2-48	—		—		7	2-48
St Finbarr's	2018	5	3-37	1	0-06	—		6	3-43
St Finbarr's	2019	3	1-22	—		—		3	1-22
St Finbarr's	2020	5	3-36	—		—		5	3-36
St Finbarr's	2021	6	3-41	2	0-13	1	0-10	9	3-64
St Finbarr's	2022	5	1-18	—		—		5	1-18
St Finbarr's	2023	3	2-24	—		—		3	2-24
St Finbarr's	2024	5	4-32	—		—		5	4-32
St Finbarr's	2025	6	6-41	2	0-25	—		8	6-66
Career total		50	25-330	5	0-44	1	0-10	56	25-384

=== Inter-county ===
As of 27 June 2026

Team	Year	National League			Munster		All-Ireland		Total	
Team	Year	Division	Apps	Score	Apps	Score	Apps	Score	Apps	Score
Cork	2018	Division 2	6	0-08	0	0-00	0	0-00	6	0-08
Cork	2019	Division 2	1	0-02	2	0-01	4	0-03	7	0-06
Cork	2020	Division 2	—		—		—		—	
Cork	2021	Division 2	—		—		—		—	
Cork	2022	Division 2	5	1-36	1	0-06	3	0-19	9	1-61
Cork	2023	Division 2	6	0-32	1	0-10	5	1-15	12	1-57
Cork	2024	Division 2	7	0-07	2	0-01	4	0-11	13	0-19
Cork	2025	Division 2	—		—		—		—	
Cork	2026	Division 2	8	0-51	3	0-13	3	0-30	14	0-94
Total			33	1-136	9	0-31	19	1-78	61	2-245

== Honours ==
St Finbarr's

- Munster Senior Club Football Championship (1): 2021
- Cork Premier Senior Football Championship (3): 2018, 2021, 2025
- Rebel Óg Premier 1 Minor Football Championship (1): 2015

Cork

- Munster Under-21 Football Championship (1): 2016
