= Tragumna =

Coastal hamlet in County Cork, Ireland

Coordinates: 51°30′03″N 9°16′00″W

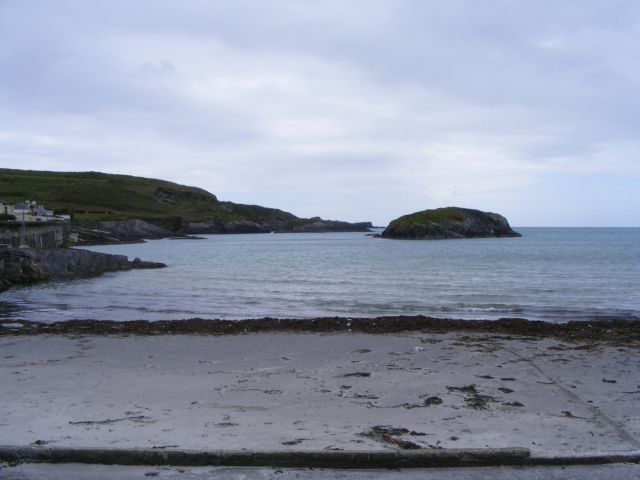
Drishane Island from Tragumna's beach

Tragumna (Irish: Tráigh Omna, meaning 'strand of the oak (trunk)') is a small hamlet and beach located in the civil parish of Castlehaven about 5 km from the town of Skibbereen in County Cork, Ireland.

The small beach at Tragumna overlooks a tiny island, Drishane Island, which is about 100 metres offshore. The beach was awarded a Blue Flag for the years 2019 and 2020.

A small lake (Lough Abisdeally) is nearby and is visited by birdwatchers. 3 km away is Lough Hyne which is a designated Marine Nature Reserve.

In March 2024, a group of ten people, of various nationalities, were arrested following surveillance of a reputed drug smuggling attempt at Tragumna pier.
