= 2021 Cork Premier Senior Football Championship =

- Dates: 14 July - 28 November 2021
- Teams: 12 clubs 5 divisions/colleges
- Sponsor: Bon Secours Hospital
- Champions: St. Finbarr's (10th title); Ian Maguire (captain); Paul O'Keeffe (manager)
- Runners-up: Clonakilty; Eoghan Deasy (captain); Haulie O'Neill (manager)
- Relegated: Ilen Rovers

Tournament statistics
- Matches played: 28
- Goals scored: 54 (1.93 per match)
- Points scored: 663 (23.68 per match)
- Top scorer(s): Steven Sherlock (3-41)

The 2021 Cork Premier Senior Football Championship was the second staging of the Cork Premier Senior Football Championship and the 133rd staging overall of a championship for the top-ranking Gaelic football teams in Cork. The draw for the group stage placings took place on 29 April 2021. The championship began on 20 July 2021 and ended on 28 November 2021.

Nemo Rangers entered the championship as the defending champions, however, they failed to make it out of the group stage after suffering two defeats. Ilen Rovers were relegated after being beaten by Carrigaline in a playoff.

The final was played on 28 November 2021 at Páirc Uí Chaoimh in Cork, between Clonakilty and St. Finbarr's, in what was their second ever final meeting and their first in 11 years. St. Finbarr's won the match by 0-14 to 0-13 to claim their tenth championship title overall and a first title since 2018.

Steven Sherlock was the championship's top scorer with 3-41.

== Team changes ==
=== To Championship ===
Promoted from the Cork Senior A Football Championship

- Éire Óg

=== From Championship ===
Relegated to the Cork Senior A Football Championship

- Bishopstown

== Participating teams ==
=== Clubs ===
The seedings were based on final group stage positions from the 2020 championship.

Top seeds Second seeds Third seeds Fourth seeds

Team	Location	Colours	Seeding
Castlehaven	Castlehaven	Blue and white	1
Nemo Rangers	Trabeg	Black and green	2
St. Finbarr's	Togher	Blue and yellow	3
Newcestown	Newcestown	Red and yellow	4
Ballincollig	Ballincollig	Green and white	5
Valley Rovers	Innishannon	Green and white	6
Carbery Rangers	Rosscarbery	Green, white and gold	7
Douglas	Douglas	Black, green and white	8
Clonakilty	Clonakilty	Green and red	9
Carrigaline	Carrigaline	Blue and gold	10
Ilen Rovers	Church Cross	Green and white	11
Éire Óg	Ovens	Red and yellow	12

=== Divisions and colleges ===
Team	Location	Colours
Carbery	Barony of Carbery	Purple and yellow
Duhallow	Barony of Duhallow	Orange and black
Imokilly	East Cork	Red and white
Muskerry	Muskerry	White and green
University College Cork	College Road	Red and black

== Results ==
=== Group A ===
==== Table ====
Advance to knockout stage Advance to relegation play-off

Team	Matches				Score			Pts
Team	Pld	W	D	L	For	Against	Diff	Pts
Douglas	3	3	0	0	2-38	1-29	12	6
Valley Rovers	3	2	0	1	7-30	0-32	19	4
Nemo Rangers	3	1	0	2	6-39	3-28	20	2
Carrigaline	3	0	0	3	1-26	12-44	-51	0

==== Results ====
4 September 2021 Round 1	Nemo Rangers	0-11 - 1-09	Valley Rovers	Páirc Liam Mhic Cárthaigh
	L Connolly 0-4, J Horgan, C Horgan 0-2 each, P Kerrigan, R Dalton, B Murphy 0-1 each.	Report	B Crowley 1-5 (0-4 f, 0-1 45), J Cottrell (f), C O'Leary, K Canty, C McCarthy 0-1 each.	Referee: P O'Driscoll (Bride Rovers)

4 September 2021 Round 1	Douglas	1-15 - 0-09	Carrigaline	Páirc Uí Rinn
	A O’Hare (1 45, 3 frees)(0-5); C Russell (1 free)(0-3), D McCarthy (1-1); B Lynch, D Ward, D Harte, B Hartnett, E Nash, S Powter (0-1 each).	Report	D Drake (3 frees)(0-4); D Griffin (0-2); A Coholan, K Kavanagh (free), S Dwane (0-1 each).	Referee: J Bermingham (Bride Rovers)

25 September 2021 Round 2	Nemo Rangers	6-17 - 1-09	Carrigaline	Páirc Uí Rinn
	B O'Driscoll 2-5, L Connolly 2-1 (0-1 f), C Horgan 1-3, P Kerrigan 1-2, R Dalton, C Dalton 0-3 each.	Report	D Drake 1-3 (1-0 pen, 0-1 f), B Pope 0-4 (0-2 f), C Murphy, D Greene 0-1 each.	Referee: P O'Leary (Cloughduv)

25 September 2021 Round 2	Douglas	0-13 - 1-09	Valley Rovers	Carrigaline GAA Grounds
	C Russell 0-6 (0-2 f), S Powter 0-2, B Hartnett, C Collins, A O’Hare, N Hartnett, B Lynch 0-1 each.	Report	B Crowley 0-3 f, C McCarthy 1-0, J Cottrell (0-1 f, 0-1 m), E Delaney 0-2 each, J Kiely, W Hurley 0-1 each.	Referee: D Murnane (Macroom)

17 October 2021 Round 3	Nemo Rangers	0-11 - 1-10	Douglas	Páirc Uí Rinn
	L Connolly (0-5 frees) 0-5, B O’Driscoll (0-2 frees) 0-3 C Horgan 0-2, P Kerrigan.	Report	C Russell (0-4 frees) 0-5, D Harte 1-0, B Hartnett 0-3, S Powter, A Sheehy 0-1 each.	Referee: J Ryan (Macroom)

17 October 2021 Round 3	Valley Rovers	5-12 - 0-08	Carrigaline	Ballinhassig GAA Grounds
	E O’Reilly 3-2, E Delaney 1-1, J Kiely 1-0, B Crowley 0-3 (0-1 f), R O’Sullivan, F Lynch 0-2 each, C O’Leary, J Cottrell 0-1 each.	Report	E Desmond, K O’Reilly 0-2 each, J McCarthy 0-2 f, L Boyle, D Drake 0-1 each.	Referee: A O’Connor (Ballygarvan)

=== Group B ===
==== Table ====
Advance to knockout stage

Team	Matches				Score			Pts
Team	Pld	W	D	L	For	Against	Diff	Pts
Castlehaven	3	3	0	0	5-40	3-37	9	6
Éire Óg	3	2	0	1	4-42	3-39	6	4
Newcestown	3	1	0	2	1-30	3-31	-7	2
Carbery Rangers	3	0	0	3	1-28	2-33	-8	0

==== Results ====
4 September 2021 Round 1	Carbery Rangers	1-09 - 1-15	Éire Óg	Charlie Hurley Park
	S Hayes 0-5 (0-2 f), J Hodnett 1-0, P O’Rourke, J O’Regan, J O’Rourke, Jerry O’Riordan 0-1 each.	Report	D Goulding 0-6 (0-3 f), D Foley 1-0, C O’Callaghan 0-2, R O’Toole, K Hallissey, John Cooper, Joe Cooper, B Hurley (f), J Murphy, J Kelleher 0-1 each.	Referee: J Regan

4 September 2021 Round 1	Castlehaven	2-12 - 1-10	Newcestown	Ahamilla GAA Complex
	C Maguire 1-1 (0-1 mark), M Hurley 0-4, B Hurley 0-3f, C Cahalane 1-0, M Collins, J Walsh, J Cahalane, D Whelton 0-1 each.	Report	S O’Sullivan 1-2, D Buckley 0-4 (0-3f), R O’Sullivan 0-3f, C Dinneen 0-1f.	Referee: C Dineen (Douglas)

25 September 2021 Round 2	Éire Óg	2-16 - 2-19	Castlehaven	St Mary's Park
	D Goulding (0-5, 0-3 f, 0-1 45), D Foley (1-1), D Dineen (1-0), C O’Callaghan (0-3), R O’Flynn (0-2), D O’Herlihy, R O’Toole, J Murphy, K Hallissey, B Hurley (0-1 each).	Report	B Hurley (1-6, 0-1 f), M Hurley (1-2, 0-1 f), C O’Driscoll (0-4), C Maguire (0-3), J Cahalane (0-2), D Whelton and M Collins (0-1 each).	Referee: J Bermingham (Bride Rovers)

26 September 2021 Round 2	Newcestown	0-09 - 0-08	Carbery Rangers	Ahamilla GAA Complex
	R O’Sullivan 0-3 f, T Twomey, C Dinneen (0-1 f) 0-2 each, D Buckley, R O’Sullivan 0-1 each.	Report	J O’Rourke 0-3, J Hayes 0-2 f, M Hodnett (m), P Shanahan (45), P O’Rourke 0-1 each.	Referee: A Long (Argideen Rangers)

17 October 2021 Round 3	Castlehaven	1-09 - 0-11	Carbery Rangers	Kilmacabea GAA Grounds
	B Hurley 1-6 (0-2 f), J Walsh, C Maguire, M Collins 0-1 each.	Report	P O’Rourke 0-3, J O’Rourke 0-2, J Fitzpatrick, D Hayes, B Shanahan, K Scannell, A Jennings, J O’Riordan 0-1 each.	Referee: J Regan (Lough Rovers)

17 October 2021 Round 3	Newcestown	0-11 - 1-11	Éire Óg	Jack Fitzgerald Memorial Park
	R O’Sullivan 0-4 (0-2f, 0-1m), T Twomey 0-3, D Buckley (0-1f), G O’Donovan, S O’Sullivan, D Curran 0-1 each.	Report	D Goulding 0-5 (0-4f), Joe Cooper 0-3, D Foley 1-0, C O’Callaghan 0-2, R O’Toole 0-1.	Referee: J Bermingham (Bride Rovers)

=== Group C ===
==== Table ====
Advance to knockout stage Advance to relegation play-off

Team	Matches				Score			Pts
Team	Pld	W	D	L	For	Against	Diff	Pts
St. Finbarr's	3	3	0	0	3-44	3-33	11	6
Clonakilty	3	2	0	1	5-25	1-35	2	4
Ballincollig	3	1	0	2	3-46	3-35	11	2
Ilen Rovers	3	0	0	3	1-32	5-44	-24	0

==== Results ====
4 September 2021 Round 1	St. Finbarr's	2-15 - 1-17	Ballincollig	Páirc Uí Rinn
	C Myers-Murray 2-3, S Sherlock 0-7 (0-2 f, 0-2 45), D O'Brien 0-2, C Dennehy, C Lyons, C Barrett 0-1 each.	Report	C Dorgan 0-8 (0-3 f, 0-2 45), M Oldham 1-0, C Kiely, Darren Murphy 0-3 each, P O'Neill 0-2, P Kelly 0-1.	Referee: A Long (Argideen Rangers_

5 September 2021 Round 1	Clonakilty	3-10 - 0-11	Ilen Rovers	Rosscarbery GAA Grounds
	D O’Shea (0-3 frees, 1-0 pen)(2-5); R Mannix (1-1); S White (free), E Deasy, J Grimes, C Daly (0-1 each).	Report	D Mac Eoin (frees), P O’Driscoll (1 free)(0-3 each); S O’Donovan (0-2); D Hegarty, M Sheehy, S Minihane (0-1 each).	Referee: D Murnane (Macroom)

25 September 2021 Round 2	Ballincollig	0-12 - 1-10	Clonakilty	Páirc Naomh Eoin
	D Murphy 0-4, L Fahey, D Dorgan (f) 0-2 each, JP Murphy, S Kiely, M Oldham, C Dorgan 0-1 each.	Report	D Ó Sé 0-6 (0-4 f), S White 1-0, S McEvoy, B Ridgeway, J O’Mahony, L O’Donovan 0-1 each.	Referee: P O'Driscoll (Bride Rovers)

25 September 2021 Round 2	Ilen Rovers	1-11 - 0-17	St. Finbarr's	Henry Ford Park
	S Leonard 1-2, S O'Donovan 0-3 (0-1 f), Peter O'Driscoll (0-1 f), D MacEoin (0-1 f), A Holland 0-2 each.	Report	S Sherlock 0-5 (0-2 f), C McCrickard 0-4, C Myers Murray 0-3, C Barrett, B Hayes 0-2 each, D Quinn 0-1.	Referee: J Ryan (Macroom)

17 October 2021 Round 3	Ballincollig	2-17 - 0-10	Ilen Rovers	Randal Óg GAA Grounds
	C Dorgan 0-8 (0-5 f, 0-1 mark), D Murphy 0-4, M Oldham, JP Murphy 1-0 each, S Kiely 0-2, L Fahy, E Cooke, C Kiely 0-1 each.	Report	S O’Donovan, Peter O’Driscoll (0-2 f) 0-3 each, S Leonard, D MacEoin (0-1 f, 0-1 45) 0-2 each.	Referee: B Sweeney (Erin's Own)

17 October 2021 Round 3	St. Finbarr's	1-12 - 1-05	Clonakilty	Coachford Sportsfield
	S Sherlock 1-2 (0-2 f), E Dennehy, B Hayes, D O’Brien 0-2 each, I Maguire, A Lyne, C McRickard (mark) 0-1 each.	Report	S McEvoy 1-1, D Ó Sé 0-2 f, J O’Mahony, R Mannix 0-1 each.	Referee: D Daly (Brian Dillons)

=== Divisional/colleges sections ===
==== Round 1 ====
13 July 2021 Round 1	Muskerry	w/o - scr.	Imokilly

==== Round 2 ====
20 July 2021 Round 2	Carbery	0-06 - 0-16	Muskerry	Castletown Sportsfield
	R O’Donovan 0-2 ( 0-1 45, 0-1f), O Scannell, G O’Callaghan, S Ryan and K O’Brien 0-1 each.	Report	M Healy 0-5 (0-1 f), L Casey and D Horgan 0-3 each, D Holmes 0-2, E O’Sullivan, J Kelleher and D Dineen 0-1 each.	Referee: J Regan (Lough Rovers)

==== Semi-final ====
29 September 2021 Semi-final	University College Cork	2-13 - 2-11	Muskerry	Páirc Uí Rinn
	C Geaney 1-4 (0-2 f), D O’Connor 1-0, S Quilter 0-3, I Jennings 0-2, C Hayes 0-2, S O’Sullivan, D Geaney 0-1 each.	Report	C Óg Jones 2-2, M Healy 0-4 f, D Dineen 0-2, F Goold, M Healy, J Kelleher 0-1 each.	Referee: R Whelan (Aghada)

==== Final ====
3 October 2021 Final	Duhallow	0-10 - 0-08	University College Cork	Páirc Uí Rinn
	C O’Callaghan 0-5, 3f, K Crowley 0-2, M Ellis, S Hickey 0-1 each.	Report	C Hayes 0-3, C Geaney 0-2, M O’Gara, D Geaney and D Clear 0-1 each.	Referee: A Long (Argideen Rangers)

=== Relegation stage ===
==== Playoff ====
13 November 2021 Playoff	Carrigaline	1-10 - 0-10	Ilen Rovers	Carbery Rangers GAA Grounds
	E Desmond 0-6 (0-2 f), C Barrett 1-0, C Dungan 0-2 45, B Pope and D Greene 0-1 each.	Report	D MacEoin 0-4 (0-2 f, 0-1 m), S O’Donovan 0-3 (0-1 f), S Leonard 0-2, Peter O’Driscoll 0-1.	Referee: D Daly (Brian Dillons)

=== Knockout stage ===
==== Quarter-finals ====
29 October 2021 Quarter-final	St. Finbarr's	1-16 - 0-12	Éire Óg	Páirc Uí Chaoimh
	S Sherlock 0-10 (0-3 f, 0-2 45), E Dennehy 1-0, C McCrickard, I Maguire 0-2 each, C Barrett, C Lyons 0-1 each.,	Report	D Goulding 0-6 (0-4 f, 0-2 45), J Murphy 0-2, D Foley, J Cooper, K Hallissey, R O'Flynn 0-1 each.	Referee: C Lane (Banteer)

31 October 2021 Quarter-final	Castlehaven	1-14 - 0-10	Valley Rovers	Páirc Uí Chaoimh
	M Collins 1-2, B Hurley 0-5 (0-2 f), C O'Driscoll 0-4 (0-1 m), M Hurley, J Cahalane, R Minihane 0-1 each.	Report	B Crowley 0-5 (0-4 f), F Lynch, R O'Sullivan, D Murphy, J Walsh, A Walsh-Murphy 0-1 each.	Referee: D Murnane (Macroom)

31 October 2021 Quarter-final	Duhallow	1-09 - 0-13	Clonakilty	Páirc Uí Chaoimh
	D O’Connor 0-5 (0-1 f, 0-1 m), J O’Connor 1-1 (0-1 m), C O’Callaghan, Shane Hickey, K Crowley 0-1 each.	Report	D O’Shea 0-6 (0-5 f), J Grimes 0-2, S White, R Mannix (m), C Daly, S McEvoy, G Barry 0-1 each.	Referee: A O'Connor (Ballygarvan)

==== Semi-finals ====
14 November 2021 Semi-final	Douglas	1-11 - 0-15	Clonakilty	Páirc Uí Chaoimh
	A O’Hare 1-5 (1-0 pen, 0-1 f), D Hanrahan 0-3, A Sheehy, B Lynch, N Hartnett, C Russell (f) 0-1 each.	Report	D Ó Sé 0-6 (0-5 f), S McEvoy 0-4, R Mannix 0-2, E Deasy, B Ridgeway, S White 0-1 each.	Referee: D Murnane (Macroom)

14 November 2021 Semi-final	St. Finbarr's	3-16 - 3-16; Penalties: 5-4	Castlehaven	Páirc Uí Chaoimh
	S Sherlock 2-10 (0-4f), C McCrickard 1-2, C Myers-Murray, C Walsh, B Hayes, D O’Brien 0-1 each.	Report	B Hurley 2-9 (0-3f, 0-2 ’45, 0-1 mark), M Hurley 1-1, C O’Driscoll, S Nolan 0-2 each, M Collins, C Maguire 0-1 each.	Referee: J Ryan (Macroom)

==== Final ====
28 November 2021 Final	Clonakilty	0-13 - 0-14	St. Finbarr's	Páirc Uí Chaoimh
	D O’Shea 0-6 (0-5f), S McEvoy, R Mannix 0-2 each, M Shanley, G Barry, J O’Mahony 0-1 each.	Report	S Sherlock 0-7 (0-4f), I Maguire, D O’Brien 0-2 each, B Hayes, C McCrickard, C Myers-Murray 0-1 each.	Referee: D Murnane (Macroom)

== Championship statistics ==
=== Top scorers ===
Overall

Rank	Player	Club	Tally	Total	Matches	Average
1	Steven Sherlock	St. Finbarr's	3-41	50	6	8.33
2	Brian Hurley	Castlehaven	4-29	41	5	8.20
3	Dara Ó Sé	Clonakilty	2-31	37	6	6.16
4	Daniel Goulding	Éire Óg	0-22	22	4	5.50
5	Billy Crowley	Valley Rovers	1-16	19	4	4.75
6	Cian Dorgan	Ballincollig	0-17	17	3	5.66
7	Luke Connolly	Nemo Rangers	2-10	16	3	5.33
8	Cillian Myers-Murray	St. Finbarr's	2-08	14	5	2.80
8	Michael Hurley	Castlehaven	2-08	14	5	2.80
8	Alan O'Hare	Douglas	1-11	14	4	3.50
8	Conor Russell	Douglas	0-14	14	4	3.50

In a single game

Rank	Player	Club	Tally	Total	Opposition
1	Steven Sherlock	St. Finbarr's	2-10	16	Castlehaven
2	Brian Hurley	Castlehaven	2-09	15	St. Finbarr's
3	Eoin O'Reilly	Valley Rovers	3-02	11	Carrigaline
3	Barry O'Driscoll	Nemo Rangers	2-05	11	Carirgaline
3	Dara Ó Sé	Clonakilty	2-05	11	Ilen Rovers
6	Steven Sherlock	St. Finbarr's	0-10	10	Éire Óg
7	Cillian Myers-Murray	St. Finbarr's	2-03	9	Ballincollig
7	Brian Hurley	Castlehaven	1-06	9	Éire Óg
7	Brian Hurley	Castlehaven	1-06	9	Carbery Rangers
10	Chris Óg Jones	Muskerry	2-02	8	UCC
10	Billy Crowley	Valley Rovers	1-05	8	Nemo Rangers
10	Cian Dorgan	Ballincollig	0-08	8	St. Finbarr's
10	Cian Dorgan	Ballincollig	0-08	8	Ilen Rovers
