= 2020 Cork Premier Senior Football Championship =

- Dates: 24 July 2020 - 29 August 2021
- Teams: 16
- Sponsor: Bon Secours Hospital
- Champions: Nemo Rangers (22nd title); Micheál Aodh Martin (captain); Paul O'Donovan (manager)
- Runners-up: Castlehaven; Mark Collins (captain); James McCarthy (manager)
- Relegated: Bishopstown

Tournament statistics
- Matches played: 27
- Goals scored: 66 (2.44 per match)
- Points scored: 634 (23.48 per match)
- Top scorer(s): Steven Sherlock (3-36)

The 2020 Cork Premier Senior Football Championship was the inaugural staging of the Cork Premier Senior Football Championship and the 132nd staging overall of a championship for the top-ranking Gaelic football teams in Cork. The draw for the group stage placings took place on 19 November 2019. The championship was scheduled to begin in April 2020, however, it was postponed indefinitely due to the impact of the COVID-19 pandemic on Gaelic games. The championship eventually began on 24 July 2020 and, after being suspended once again on 5 October 2020, and eventually ended on 29 August 2021.

Nemo Rangers were the defending champions.

The final was played on 29 August 2021 at Páirc Uí Chaoimh in Cork, between Castlehaven and Nemo Rangers, in what was their third final meeting and their first in six years. Nemo Rangers won the match by 3-07 to 0-13 to claim their 22nd championship title overall and a second title in succession.

Steven Sherlock from the St. Finbarr's club was the championship's top scorer with 3-36.

== Format change ==
On 26 March 2019, three championship proposals were circulated to Cork club delegates. A core element running through all three proposals, put together by the Cork GAA games workgroup, was that there be a group stage of 12 teams, straight relegation, and one team from the divisions/colleges section to enter at the preliminary quarter-final stage. On 2 April 2019, a majority of 136 club delegates voted for Option A which would see one round of games played in April and two more in August – all with county players available.

== Participating teams ==
=== Clubs ===
The club rankings were based on a championship performance 'points' system over the previous four seasons.

Team	Location	Colours	Seeding	Ranking
Nemo Rangers	Trabeg	Black and green	A	1
St. Finbarr's	Togher	Blue and gold	A	2
Carbery Rangers	Rosscarbery	Green, white and gold	A	3
Ballincollig	Ballincollig	Red, white and black	B	4
Castlehaven	Castlehaven	Blue and white	B	5
Valley Rovers	Innishannon	Green and white	B	6
Douglas	Douglas	Black, white and green	C	7
Newcestown	Newcestown	Red and yellow	C	8
Clonakilty	Clonakilty	Red and green	C	9
Ilen Rovers	Church Cross	Green and white	D	10
Bishopstown	Bishopstown	Maroon and white	D	11
Carrigaline	Carrigaline	Blue and yellow	D	12

=== Divisions and colleges ===
Team	Location	Colours
Beara	Beara Peninsula	Red and white
Carbery	West Cork	Purple and yellow
Duhallow	Duhallow	Red and white
University College Cork	College Road	Red and black

== Fixtures/results ==
=== Group 1 ===
==== Table ====
Advance to knockout stage

Team	Matches				Score			Pts
Team	Pld	W	D	L	For	Against	Diff	Pts
St. Finbarr's	3	3	0	0	4-50	2-33	23	4
Ballincollig	3	2	0	1	4-35	2-34	7	4
Clonakilty	3	1	0	2	3-35	3-42	-7	2
Carrigaline	3	0	0	3	1-29	5-40	-23	0

==== Results ====
24 July 2020 Round 1	St. Finbarr's	1-13 - 0-10	Ballincollig	Páirc Uí Rinn
	E McGreevey (1-1), S Sherlock (0-3 frees) and C Myers Murray (0-4 each), C Keane, B Hayes, I Maguire and C Barrett (0-1 each).	Report	C Dorgan (0-6, 0-5 frees), D Murphy (0-2), C Kiely (free) and L Fahy (0-1 each).	Referee: J Bermingham (Bride Rovers)

25 July 2020 Round 1	Clonakilty	1-12 - 0-08	Carrigaline	Charlie Hurley Park
	D Ó Sé 0-8 (0-2f), D O’Regan 1-0, J Grimes, B White, B Ridgeway, S White 0-1 each.	Report	J McCarthy 0-2, Kieran Kavanagh, D Griffin, Kevin Kavanagh, D Greene, O Barry, É Desmond (0-1f) 0-1 each.	Referee: P O'Driscoll (Bride Rovers)

16 August 2020 Round 2	Ballincollig	2-17 - 1-10	Clonakilty	St. Mary's Park
	C Dorgan (1-7, 5 frees, 1-0 pen); D Murphy (0-6); D Dorgan (1-0); K Browne (0-2); S Kiely, C Kiely (0-1 each).	Report	D Ó Sé (1-6, 4 frees, 1-0 pen); J Grimes, S McEvoy, S White, D O’Regan (0-1 each).	Referee: J Ryan (Macroom)

16 August 2020 Round 2	St. Finbarr's	2-20 - 1-10	Carrigaline	Páirc Uí Chaoimh
	S Sherlock (1-11, 2 frees, 2 45s), C Myers Murray (1-4), B Hayes (0-2), C Lyons, C Keane and E McGreevey (0-1 each).	Report	E Desmond (0-6, 0-2 frees), K McIntyre (1-1), J McCarthy (free), S Dwane and O Barry (0-1 each).	Referee: A Long (Argideen Rangers)

6 September 2020 Round 3	Ballincollig	2-08 - 0-11	Carrigaline	Páirc Uí Rinn
	C Dorgan (45, 4frees)(0-5); D Dorgan (1-1); E Cooke (1-0); S Kiely (0-2).	Report	E Desmond (frees)(0-4); J McCarthy (frees), D Greene, L Boyle (45) (0-2 each); D Griffin (0-1).

6 September 2020 Round 3	St. Finbarr's	1-17 - 1-13	Clonakilty	Coachford Sportsfield
	S Sherlock 1-7 (0-2 f, 0-1 mark, 0-1 45), B Hayes 0-3, C Myers-Murray and E Finn 0-2 each, C Lyons, A Lyne and E McGreevey 0-1 each.	Report	D Ó Sé 0-6 (0-5 f), J Grimes 1-2, T Clancy, D Lowney, J O'Mahony, D O'Regan, B White 0-1 each.

=== Group 2 ===
==== Table ====
Advance to knockout stage Advance to relegation play-offs

Team	Matches				Score			Pts
Team	Pld	W	D	L	For	Against	Diff	Pts
Castlehaven	3	3	0	0	5-45	2-22	32	6
Newcestown	3	2	0	1	5-38	4-28	13	4
Carbery Rangers	3	1	0	2	2-32	2-34	-2	2
Ilen Rovers	3	0	0	3	3-19	7-50	-43	0

==== Results ====
25 July 2020 Round 1	Newcestown	3-17 - 1-07	Ilen Rovers	Sam Maguire Park
	C Keane 2-1, C Healy 0-4 (1f), D Buckley 0-3, T Twomey 1-0, G O’Donovan, L Meade, S O’Sullivan 0-2 each, J Meade, M Kelly, C Dinneen (0-1f) 0-1 each.	Report	S O’Donovan 1-1 (1-0 penalty, 0-1f), D Mac Eoin 0-2f, S Leonard, Peter O’Driscoll, D Collins, Conor O’Driscoll 0-1 each.	Referee: A Long (Argideen Rangers)

26 July 2020 Round 1	Carbery Rangers	0-09 - 0-14	Castlehaven	Ahamilla Complex
	S Hayes (0-4, 0-2 frees); M Hodnett (0-3, 0-2 frees); D Hayes, J Hayes (0-1 each).	Report	M Hurley (0-6; B Hurley (0-4, 0-1 ‘45); M Collins (0-2, 0-2 frees); C Cahalane, C Maguire (0-1 each).

15 August 2020 Round 2	Carbery Rangers	0-14 - 0-08	Ilen Rovers	Leap Sportsfield
	S Hayes 0-5 (0-3f), J O’Rourke 0-4, B Shanahan 0-2 (0-1 45), B Hodnett, J O’Regan, J Fitzpatrick 0-1 each.	Report	S Leonard 0-4, S O’Donovan 0-2 (0-1f), K Lynch, D Mac Eoin 0-1 each.	Referee: C Dineena (Douglas)

16 August 2020 Round 2	Castlehaven	1-12 - 0-09	Newcestown	Rossa Park
	M Collins 0-6 (0-5 frees), M Hurley 1-0, B Hurley, C O’Driscoll, C Maguire 0-2 each.	Report	C Healy 0-3 (frees), D Buckley 0-2, D Twomey (free), C Dinneen, L Meade, T Twomey 0-1 each.	Referee: C Lane (Lyre)

6 September 2020 Round 3	Carbery Rangers	2-09 - 2-12	Newcestown	Henry Ford Park
	M Hodnett 1-1, B Shanahan 1-0, J Hayes (0-2f), J O’Rourke, B Hodnett 0-2 each, J Fitzpatrick, Jerry O’Riordan 0-1 each.	Report	T Twomey 1-2, J Meade 1-0, D Twomey 0-4 (0-1f), D Buckley, C Keane 0-2 each, L Meade, S O’Sullivan 0-1 each.

6 September 2020 Round 3	Castlehaven	4-19 - 2-04	Ilen Rovers	Gabriel Rangers GAA Grounds
	M Collins 2-3 (0-2 frees), B Hurley 0-7 (0-2 frees, 0-2 45’s), C Cahalane 0-3, R Maguire 1-0, C O’Driscoll 0-2, J Cahalane 1-2, C Maguire and Darragh Cahalane 0-1 each.	Report	C Harrington and C O’Driscoll 1-0 each, Peter O’Driscoll, K Lynch, S O’Donovan (free) and D Mac Eoin 0-1 each.

=== Group 3 ===
==== Table ====
Advance to knockout stage Advance to relegation play-offs

Team	Matches				Score			Pts
Team	Pld	W	D	L	For	Against	Diff	Pts
Nemo Rangers	3	3	0	0	6-40	2-25	27	6
Valley Rovers	3	2	0	1	2-35	7-21	-1	4
Douglas	3	1	0	3	5-29	3-38	-3	2
Bishopstown	3	0	0	3	2-23	3-43	-23	0

==== Results ====
24 July 2020 Round 1	Nemo Rangers	3-08 - 1-09	Valley Rovers	Cloughduv
	L Connolly 2-3 (0-1 f), C O’Donovan 1-0, B O’Driscoll 0-3 (0-1 f), P Kerrigan 0-2.	Report	F Lynch 0-7 (0-4 f, 0-1 45), J Walsh 1-0, E O’Reilly and K Canty 0-1 each.	Referee: J Ryan (Macroom)

25 July 2020 Round 1	Douglas	1-14 - 1-09	Bishopstown	Páirc Uí Rinn
	C Russell (3 fs)(0-5); D Kelly (1-1); N Hartnett, B Hartnett (0-2 each); L Dineen, D Ward, L McGrath, S Wilson (0-1 each).	Report	B O’Neill (fs)(0-4), O Devlin (1-0); M Oakes (fs)(0-2); S Collins (f), P O’Flynn, D Costello, (0-1 each).	Referee: B Coniry (Crosshaven)

15 August 2020 Round 2	Nemo Rangers	2-17 - 0-06	Bishopstown	Páirc Uí Rinn
	L Connolly (0-8, 0-6 frees); M Cronin (1-4, 0-1 free); S Cronin (1-0); P Kerrigan (0-2); B Murphy, J Horgan (0-1 each).	Report	K O’Halloran (0-1 ‘45), J O’Sullivan (0-1 mark), O Devlin (0-1 free), S Collins, D Costelloe, B Clifford (0-1 each).	Referee: D Murnane (Macroom)

16 August 2020 Round 2	Valley Rovers	1-14 - 3-05	Douglas	Ovens Sportsfield
	F Lynch (0-6, 0-2 45s, 0-1 free), C O’Leary (1-0), B Crowley, J Walsh, E O’Reilly (0-2 each), A Walsh Murphy and J Cottrell (mark) (0-1 each).	Report	B Hartnett, E O’Sullivan and F Ó Luanaigh (1-0 each), C Russell (0-3, 0-2 frees), F Desmond and S Collins (0-1 each).	Referee: J Bermingham (Bride Rovers)

6 September 2020 Round 3	Nemo Rangers	1-15 - 1-10	Douglas	Páirc Uí Chaoimh
	L Connolly (0-6, 0-4 frees, 0-1 mark); R Dalton (1-1); P Kerrigan (0-3); M Cronin (0-2, 0-1 free); K O’Donovan, B O’Driscoll, C Horgan (0-1 each).	Report	C Russell (0-5, 0-3 frees); D Ward (0-3); S McCarthy (1-0); B Hartnett, L Dineen (0-1 each).

6 September 2020 Round 3	Valley Rovers	0-12 - 1-08	Bishopstown	Ballinora Sportsfield
	F Lynch 0-4 f, B Crowley 0-2, A Walsh Murphy, C O’Leary, K Canty, J Walsh, E Delaney, E O’Reilly 0-1 each.	Report	P O’Flynn 1-1, S Collins 0-4 (0-1 f), M Power 0-2, K O’Halloran 0-1 f.

=== Divisional/colleges sections ===
==== Semi-finals ====
20 August 2020 Semi-final	Carbery	0-11 - 0-16	University College Cork	Ovens Sportsfield
	G O’Callaghan 0-4 (0-3 f), K O’Driscoll, D O’Driscoll 0-3 each, K Keohane D McCarthy 0-1 each.	Report	J McEntee 0-8 (0-1 f), S Walsh 0-5 (0-3 f, 0-1 mark), C Crowley, J Twomey, J O’Mullane 0-1 each.

Semi-final	Duhallow	w/o - scr.	Beara	Sam Maguire Park

==== Final ====
23 August 2020 Final	University College Cork	6-12 - 4-20	Duhallow	O'Connell Park
	C Geaney (2-1), R Ó Beaglaioch (1-2, 1f, 1 mark), E O’Brien (0-3, frees), I Jennings, J McEntee, D Casey (1-0 each), J O’Mullane, L Wall, S Walsh, L Kennedy, A Quinn, C Crowley (0-1 each).	Report	Séamus Hickey (1-3), J O’Connor (1f), C O’Callaghan (1-2 each), E McSweeney (0-4, 2f), M Ellis (1-1), D O’Connor (0-3, 2f), P Walsh (0-2), Shane Hickey, N Flahive, F O’Connor (0-1 each).	Referee: C Dineen (Douglas)

=== Knock-out stage ===
==== Relegation playoff ====
20 September 2020 Playoff	Ilen Rovers	0-18 - 1-06	Bishopstown	Ahamilla Sportsfield
	S O’Donovan (0-7, 0-1 mark, 0-1 free), D Mac Eoin (0-6, 0-2 frees), S Leonard (0-3), Peter O’Driscoll and D Hegarty (0-1 each).	Report	Ó Devlin (0-3, 2 frees), B Clifford (1-0), P O’Flynn (0-1 free), D Costelloe and S Collins (0-1 each).

==== Quarter-finals ====
20 September 2020 Quarter-final	Duhallow	0-16 - 0-15	Valley Rovers	Páirc Uí Rinn
	D O’Connor (0-5, 0-3 frees); M Ellis, J O’Connor (0-3 each); P Walsh, E McSweeney, F O’Connor, Seamus Hickey, D Moynihan (0-1 each).	Report	F Lynch (0-5, 0-3 frees); B Crowley, Tadhg O’Brien (0-2 each); E O’Reilly, A Walsh Murphy, C O’Leary, E Delaney, J Cottrell (0-1 free), J Walsh (0-1 each).

27 September 2020 Quarter-final	Nemo Rangers	5-07 - 0-14	Ballincollig	Páirc Uí Rinn
	L Connolly 3-3 (1-0 pen, 0-2f, 0-1 ’45), M Cronin 1-2, R Dalton 1-1, P Kerrigan 0-1.	Report	C Dorgan 0-5 (0-2f, 0-1 ’45), D Murphy 0-4, C Kiely 0-2, C Moore, E Cooke, D Dorgan 0-1 each.

30 September 2020 Quarter-final	St. Finbarr's	0-14 - 1-08	Newcestown	Páirc Uí Chaoimh
	S Sherlock 0-6 (0-3f), C Myers-Murray 0-5, E Finn, E McGreevy, D O’Brien 0-1 each.	Report	D Twomey 0-5 (0-5f), S O’Sullivan 1-0, D Buckley 0-2, C Dineen 0-1 (0-1f).

==== Semi-finals ====
4 October 2020 Semi-final	Nemo Rangers	0-14 - 2-07	Duhallow	Páirc Uí Rinn
	M Cronin (0-4, 0-2 frees); P Kerrigan (0-3); C Horgan (0-2, 0-1 mark), L Connolly (0-2, 0-1 mark, 0-1 ‘45); J Horgan, B O’Driscoll, C O’Brien (0-1 each).	Report	M Ellis, Séamus Hickey (1-1 each); D O’Connor (0-2, 0-1 free); P Walsh, C O’Callaghan, F O’Connor (0-1 each).

4 October 2020 Semi-final	Castlehaven	1-13 - 1-13; Penalties: 4-3	St. Finbarr's	Páirc Uí Rinn
	M Collins (frees), B Hurley (0-2 frees, 0-1 sideline) (0-4 each), C Cahalane (1-0), M Hurley (0-2), Damien Cahalane, J Walsh, C Maguire (0-1 each).	Report	S Sherlock (1-9, 7 frees); B Hayes (0-2); D O’Brien, C Myers Murray (0-1 each).

==== Final ====
29 August 2021 Final	Nemo Rangers	3-07 - 0-13	Castlehaven	Páirc Uí Chaoimh
	L Connolly 2-0, C Dalton 1-0, P Kerrigan, R Dalton 0-2 each, A O’Donovan, B O’Driscoll, J McDermott 0-1 each.	Report	B Hurley 0-8 (0-6f), M Hurley 0-3, C O’Driscoll 0-2.	Referee: C Lane (Banteer)

== Championship statistics ==
=== Top scorers ===
Overall

Rank	Player	Club	Tally	Total	Matches	Average
1	Steven Sherlock	St. Finbarr's	3-36	45	5	9.00
2	Luke Connolly	Nemo Rangers	7-22	43	6	7.16
3	Cian Dorgan	Ballincollig	1-23	26	4	6.50
4	Brian Hurley	Castlehaven	0-25	25	5	5.00
5	Dara Ó Sé	Clonakilty	1-20	23	3	7.66
6	Fiachra Lynch	Valley Rovers	0-22	22	4	5.50
7	Mark Collins	Castlehaven	2-15	21	5	4.20
8	Cillian Myers-Murray	St. Finbarr's	1-16	19	5	3.80
9	Mark Cronin	Nemo Rangers	2-12	18	5	3.60
10	Seán O'Donovan	Ilen Rovers	0-14	14	4	3.50

In a single game

Rank	Player	Club	Tally	Total	Opposition
1	Steven Sherlock	St. Finbarr's	1-11	14	Carrigaline
2	Luke Connolly	Nemo Rangers	3-03	12	Ballincollig
2	Steven Sherlock	St. Finbarr's	1-09	12	Castlehaven
4	Cian Dorgan	Ballincollig	1-07	10	Clonakilty
4	Steven Sherlock	St. Finbarr's	1-07	10	Clonakilty
6	Luke Connolly	Nemo Rangers	2-03	9	Valley Rovers
6	Mark Collins	Castlehaven	2-03	9	Ilen Rovers
6	Dara Ó Sé	Clonakilty	1-06	9	Ballincollig
9	Dara Ó Sé	Clonakilty	0-08	8	Carrigaline
9	James McEntee	UCC	0-08	8	Carbery
9	Luke Connolly	Nemo Rangers	0-08	8	Bishopstown
9	Brian Hurley	Castlehaven	0-08	8	Nemo Rangers

=== Miscellaneous ===
- The quarter-final between Ballincollig and Nemo Rangers was postponed after it emerged that a Ballincollig player had tested positive for Covid-19 and a decision was made to temporarily suspend all club activity for 48 hours as a precautionary measure.
