= Jack Cahalane =

Irish Gaelic footballer and hurler

Personal information
- Native name: Seán Ó Cathaláin (Irish)
- Born: 2002 (age 23–24) Cork, Ireland
- Occupation: Student
- Height: 6 ft 0 in (183 cm)

Sport
- Sport: Gaelic football
- Position: Left corner-forward
Clubs*
| Years | Club | Apps (scores) |
| 2020–present 2020–present | Castlehaven; St Finbarr's | 24 (4–21); 17 (1–29) |
Club titles
| | Football | Hurling |
| Cork titles | 1 | 1 |
| Munster titles | 1 | 0 |
College
- Years: College
- MTU Cork
College titles
- Sigerson titles: 0
- Fitzgibbon titles: 0
Inter-county
| Years | County | Apps (scores) |
| 2022 | Cork | 1 (0-00) |
Inter-county titles
- Munster titles: 0
- All-Irelands: 0
- NHL: 1
- All Stars: 0
- * club appearances and scores correct as of 14:47, 10 December 2023.

Jack Cahalane (born 2002) is an Irish Gaelic footballer and hurler who plays for club sides St Finbarr's and Castlehaven and at senior level with the Cork county football team. He usually lines out as a forward.

== Career ==
Cahalane played as a dual player at school level with Coláiste an Spioraid Naoimh and later moved to Christian Brothers College and came in two successive Harty Cup finals in 2019 and 2020 but losing both to Midleton CBS and St. Flannan's College, Ennis. While he also lining out at juvenile and underage levels with the St. Finbarr's and Castlehaven clubs. He made his senior debut in both codes in 2020. Cahalane first played at inter-county level with Cork as a dual minor in 2018 and ended his time in this grade with an All-Ireland MFC title. He later won consecutive All-Ireland U20C titles with the Cork under-20 hurling team. Cahalane was added to the Cork senior football team for the 2022 McGrath Cup.

== Personal life ==
His father, Niall Cahalane, and his uncle, John Cleary, won All-Ireland SFC medals as members of the Cork senior football team in 1989 and 1990. Cahalane's aunt, Nollaig Cleary, won nine All-Ireland medals with Cork. His brothers, Conor and Damien Cahalane, have also played for Cork.

== Career statistics ==
As of match played 12 June 2022

| Team | Year | National League | | | Munster | | All-Ireland | | Total | |
| Team | Year | Division | Apps | Score | Apps | Score | Apps | Score | Apps | Score |
|---|---|---|---|---|---|---|---|---|---|---|
| Cork | 2022 | Division 2 | — | | — | | 1 | 0-00 | 1 | 0-00 |
| Total | | | — | | — | | 1 | 0-00 | 1 | 0-00 |

== Honours ==
St. Finbarr's

- Cork Premier Senior Hurling Championship: 2022

Castlehaven

- Munster Senior Club Football Championship: 2023
- Cork Premier Senior Football Championship: 2023

Cork

- National Hurling League: 2025
- All-Ireland Under-20 Hurling Championship: 2020, 2021
- Munster Under-20 Hurling Championship: 2020, 2021
- Munster Under-20 Football Championship: 2021
- All-Ireland Minor Football Championship: 2019

Sporting positions
| Preceded by Cormac O'Brien | Cork Under-20 Hurling Team Captain; 2022 | Succeeded by Micheál Mullins |
