= Michael Hurley (Gaelic footballer) =

Irish Gaelic footballer

Michael "Man of the match" Hurley
Personal information
- Native name: Mícheál Ó hUrthuile (Irish)
- Born: 22 March 1996 (age 30) Castlehaven, County Cork, Ireland
- Height: 5 ft 9 in (175 cm)

Sport
- Sport: Gaelic Football
- Position: Corner Froward
Club
- Years: Club
- Castlehaven
Club titles
- Cork titles: 1
College
- Years: College
- Institute of Technology, Carlow
College titles
- Sigerson titles: 0
Inter-county
- Years: County
- 2016-2021: Cork
Inter-county titles
- Munster titles: 0
- All-Irelands: 0
- NFL: 0
- All Stars: 0

Michael Hurley (born 22 March 1996) is an Irish Gaelic footballer who plays for Premier Senior Championship club Castlehaven and at inter-county level with the Cork senior football team. He usually lines out as a corner forward.

== Honours ==
Castlehaven

- Cork Senior Football Championship (1): 2013

Cork

- National Football League Division 3 (1): 2020
- Munster Under-21 Football Championship (1): 2016
