= Fiachra Lynch =

Irish Gaelic footballer

Personal information
- Native name: Fiachra Ó Loingsigh (Irish)
- Born: 12 June 1987 (age 39) Cork, Ireland
- Height: 1.9 m (6 ft 3 in)

Sport
- Sport: Gaelic Football
- Position: Full forward
Club
- Years: Club
- 2004-: Valley Rovers
Club titles
- Cork titles: 1
Inter-county
- Years: County
- 2009-2012: Cork
Inter-county titles
- Munster titles: 1
- All-Irelands: 1
- NFL: 2
- All Stars: 0

Fiachra Lynch (born 12 June 1987 in Cork, Ireland) is an Irish sportsperson. He plays Gaelic football with his local club Valley Rovers and has been a member of the Cork senior inter-county team since 2009.

Before joining the senior team he enjoyed much success at underage level. He won a Munster Minor Championship in 2005. He then joined the Cork Under 21 team in 2006 where he won a Munster Championship medal; he also played in the All Ireland Final that year but Cork lost out to Mayo. In 2007 Cork retained their Munster Championship and went one better from the year before and beat Laois to give Lynch an All Ireland Under 21 medal. He also played with the Cork junior team. He won a Munster Championship medal with them in 2007 and later added an All Ireland medal. In 2013 he was again part of the Cork Junior team and won another Munster medal.

He was part of the Cork senior panel that won the Munster Championship in 2009 and later lost out to Kerry in the All Ireland Final. He was again part of the panel that won the 2010 All Ireland title beating Down in the final. In 2011 he played in the National League winning team.

At club level he helped Valley Rovers win a County Intermediate Championship.
