= Mark White (Gaelic footballer) =

Irish Gaelic footballer

Personal information
- Native name: Marc de Faoite (Irish)
- Born: 14 April 1998 (age 28) Clonakilty, County Cork, Ireland
- Occupation: Student
- Height: 6 ft 4 in (193 cm)

Sport
- Sport: Gaelic Football
- Position: Goalkeeper
Club
- Years: Club
- 2016-present: Clonakilty
Club titles
- Cork titles: 0
College
- Years: College
- University College Cork
College titles
- Sigerson titles: 1
Inter-county*
Years	County	Apps (scores)
2017-present	Cork	2 (0-00)
Inter-county titles
- Munster titles: 0
- All-Irelands: 0
- NFL: 0
- All Stars: 0
- *Inter County team apps and scores correct as of 01:28, 24 June 2018.

Mark White (born 14 April 1998) is an Irish Gaelic footballer. A member of the Clonakilty club, he currently plays as a goalkeeper with the Cork senior team.
