= Castlehaven =

Civil parish in County Cork, Ireland

Castlehaven Gleann Bearcháin
- Civil parish
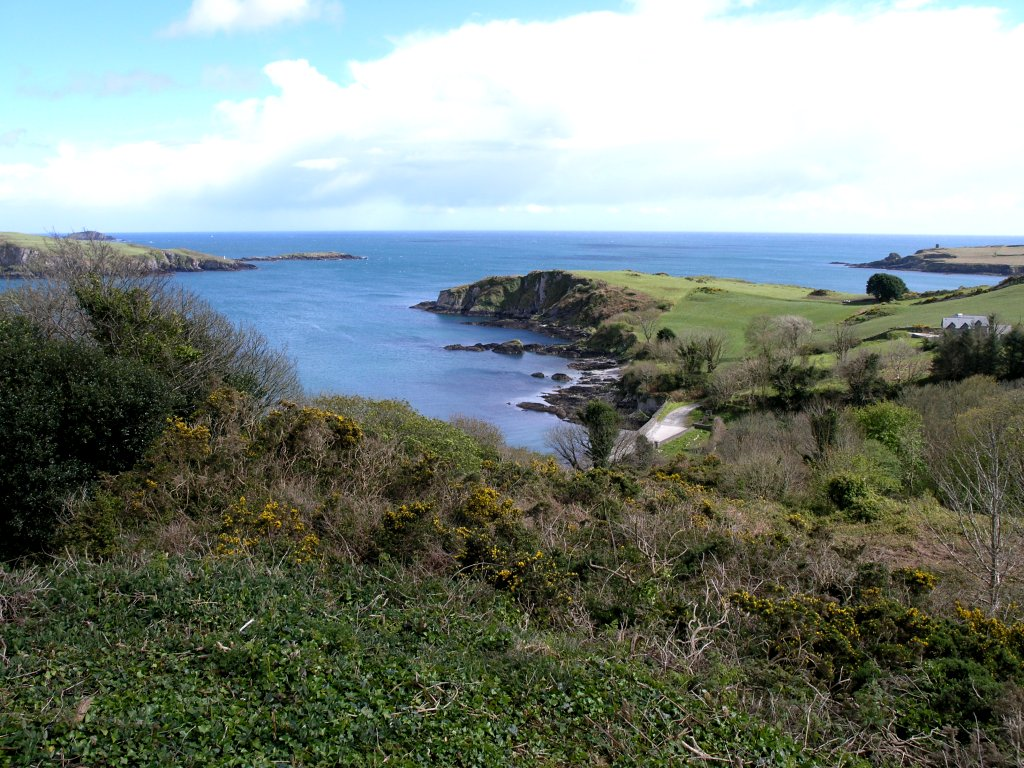
- Castlehaven bay to the south of Castletownshend

- Location in Ireland
- Coordinates: 51°32′8″N 9°11′54″W
- Country: Ireland
- Province: Munster
- County: County Cork
- Time zone: UTC+0 (WET)
  - Summer (DST): UTC-1 (IST (WEST))

Castlehaven (Irish: Gleann Bearcháin) is a civil parish in County Cork, Ireland. It is located in West Cork, approximately 45 miles south-west of Cork City on the coast. The civil parish includes the town of Castletownshend and the hamlets of Rineen and Tragumna. The area's Gaelic football club, Castlehaven GAA, has claimed several Munster Senior Club Football Championship titles.

== History ==
The Irish name Gleann Bearcháin was historically anglicised as Glanbarighan, Glanbaraghan and Glanbarrahan. The Battle of Castlehaven was a naval battle fought in 1601 during the Nine Years' War.

== Sport ==
Castlehaven GAA is a Gaelic football club based in Castlehaven which participates in Cork GAA competitions. It has won six Cork Senior Football Championships and four Munster Senior Club Football Championships.
