= Togher, Cork =

Suburb of Cork city, Ireland

Togher An Tochar
- Suburb
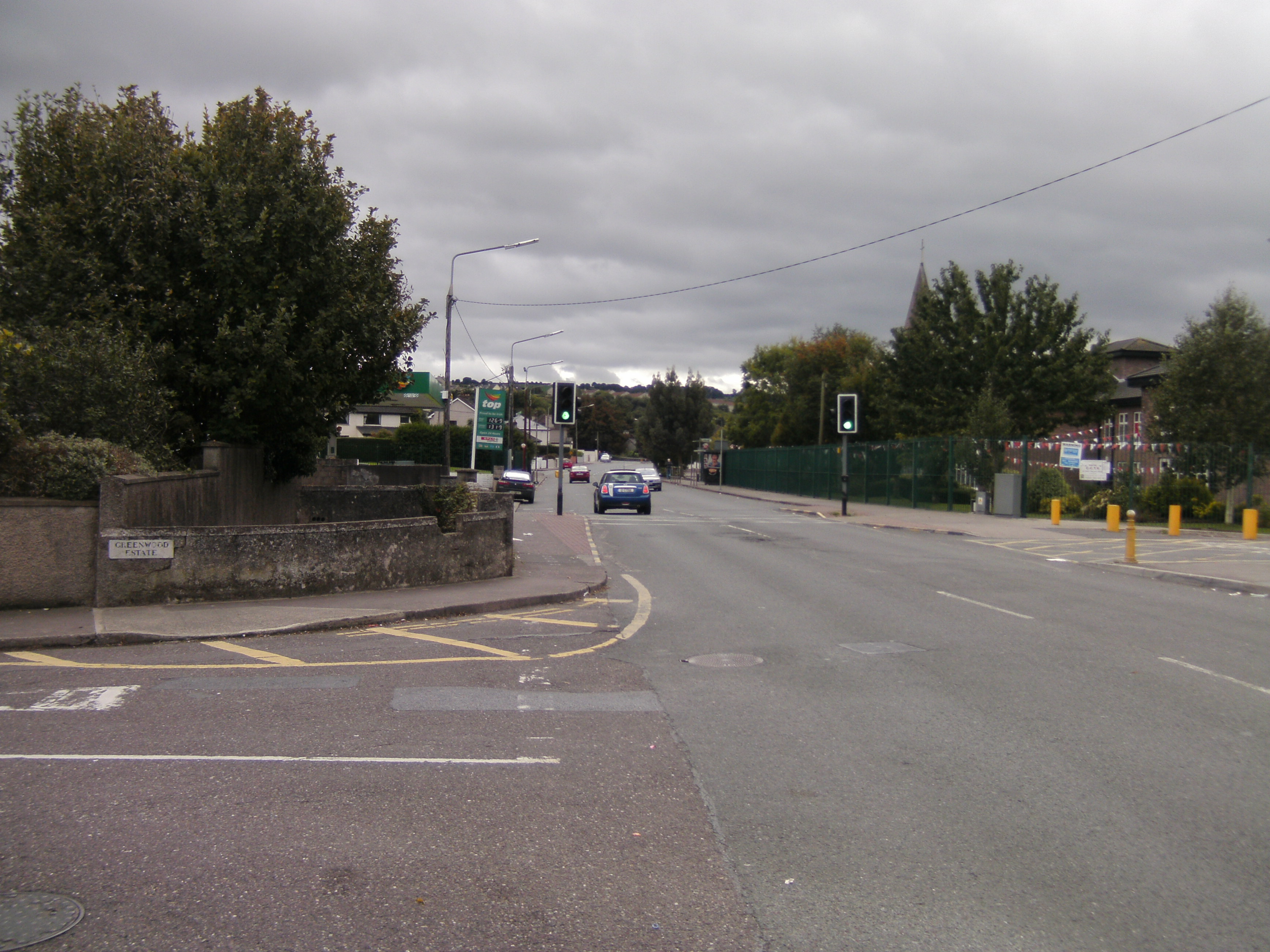
- Togher Road in Togher

- Location in Cork
- Coordinates: 51°52′45″N 8°29′31″W
- Country: Ireland
- Province: Munster
- Local government area: Cork (city)

Population (2016)
  - Total: 2,765
- (combined Togher A and Togher B electoral divisions)
- Time zone: UTC+0 (WET)
  - Summer (DST): UTC-1 (IST (WEST))

Togher (Irish: An Tóchar, meaning 'causeway or level place') is a suburb on the southside of Cork city, Ireland. Togher is within the Dáil constituency of Cork South-Central.

== Geography ==
Togher is bounded to the north by The Lough, to the south by Ballincrannig and Farmers Cross, to the east by Ballyphehane and to the west by Waterfall and Wilton. Flowing through the parish is the Liberty Stream, from Corcoran's Bridge to Togher Cross where it disappears underground for a short while before re-emerging at Greenwood and joining the larger Tramore River on its way to Douglas.

Togher is divided into the electoral divisions of Togher A and Togher B, which (as of 2016) had a combined population of 2,765. These divisions are bounded by Glasheen River on the western side, with the Glenmore River acting partially as its eastern flank with the Pouladuff road forming part of the boundary as far as the junction of Pearse Road.

== History ==
Historically Togher was an agricultural area with large estates owned by ascendancy families such as the Sarsfields. Togher originally lay in the parish of St Finbarr's South until 1890, when it formed part of the newly created parish of St Finbarr's West, better known as the Lough Parish. Togher's Roman Catholic church, the 'Church of the Way of the Cross', was built in 1972 to "meet the needs of the growing suburban population". In 1973, the 37th Cork Scout Group moved from the city centre to Togher. The Togher Historical Association has been active since 2009.

== Sport ==
Local clubs include St Finbarr's GAA club, Everton FC, Pearse Celtic, and Greenwood FC. Togher Athletic Club is home of Irish racewalking Olympian Robert Heffernan.

== Notable people ==
- Brian Carey, footballer
- Linda Doyle, electrical and electronic engineer, Provost of Trinity College Dublin from 2021
- Joe Gamble, footballer
- Denis Irwin, footballer
- Sinead Lohan, singer and songwriter
