= 2015 Cork Senior Football Championship =

Gaelic football competition

- Dates: 6 April 2015 – 25 October 2015
- Teams: 24
- Sponsor: Evening Echo
- Champions: Nemo Rangers (19th title); Paul Kerrigan (captain); Steven O'Brien (manager)
- Runners-up: Castlehaven; David Limrick (captain); Jim Nolan (manager)
- Relegated: Aghada

Tournament statistics
- Matches played: 39
- Top scorer(s): Paul Kerrigan (4-22)

The 2014 Cork Senior Football Championship was the 127th staging of the Cork Senior Football Championship since its establishment by the Cork County Board in 1887. The draw for the opening round fixtures took place on 14 December 2014. The championship began on 6 April 2015 and ended on 25 October 2015.

Ballincollig were the defending champions, however, they were defeated by Castlehaven at the quarter-final stage.

On 25 October 2015, Nemo Rangers won the championship following a 1-10 to 0-11 defeat of Castlehaven in a final replay at Páirc Uí Rinn. It was their 19th championship title overall and their first title since 2010.

== Team changes ==
=== To Championship ===
Promoted from the Cork Premier Intermediate Football Championship

- Valley Rovers

=== From Championship ===
Relegated to the Cork Premier Intermediate Football Championship

- St. Vincent's

== Results ==
=== Divisional section ===
6 April 2015 Round 1	Beara	4-13 - 0-13	Seandún	Ballingeary
	G Murphy 1-2, A O'Sullivan 1-2, ST O'Sullivan 1-1, TJ O'Sullivan 1-1, C Harrington 0-3, C Lowney 0-1, J Harrington 0-1, L Harrington 0-1, D Fenton 0-1.		JP Murphy 0-8, E Buckley 0-1, R Carroll 0-1, A Harte 0-1, G Kelleher 0-1, P Cronin 0-1.	Referee: J Ryan (Macroom)

14 April 2015 Round 1	Cork Institute of Technology	1-06 - 0-12	Muskerry	Ballincollig
	J Corkery 1-1, C Vaughan 0-2, B O'Sullivan 0-1, C O'Shea 0-1, N O'Connor 0-1.		D Goold 0-4, D Goudling 0-4, S Kiely 0-2, F Goold 0-1, L Shorten 0-1.	Referee: C Lane (Banteer)

14 April 2015 Round 1	University College Cork	0-18 - 1-06	Carbery	Castle Grounds, Macroom
	P Geaney 0-5, C Cox 0-4, M Walsh 0-3, D Harrington 0-2, S Keane 0-1, T Clancy 0-1, B O'Sullivan 0-1, J Murphy 0-1.		M Sugrue 1-2, R Deane 0-2, G O'Callaghan 0-1, K O'Driscoll 0-1.	Referee: J Bermingham (Bride Rovers)

15 April 2015 Round 1	Duhallow	3-11 - 1-10	Avondhu	Banteer
	J Corkery 2-0, S Hickey 1-1, I Walsh 0-3, J O'Connor 0-3, AJ O'Connor 0-2, K Crowley 0-1, A O'Connor 0-1.		E Stanton 1-2, A O'Brien 0-4, M Sheehan 0-2, F McCarthy 0-1, P Egan 0-1.	Referee: D Daly (Brian Dillons)

16 June 2015 Round 2	Duhallow	2-17 - 1-14	Muskerry	Castle Grounds, Macroom
	D O'Connor 0-10, G O'Connor 1-2, A O'Connor 1-2, S Hickey 0-1, J Ryan 0-1, J Corkery 0-1.		D Goulding 1-4, D Goold 0-3, F Goold 0-3, S Kiely 0-1, L Seartan 0-1, D Keohane 0-1, B Seartan 0-1.	Referee: K Murphy (Nemo Rangers)

19 June 2015 Round 2	University College Cork	1-16 - 1-20 (aet)	Beara	Sam Maguire Park, Dunmanway
	C Cox 0-9, K O'Sullivan 1-0, A Spillane 0-3, S O'Donoghue 0-1, M Walsh 0-1, S Murphy 0-1, C Gleeson 0-1.		C Harrington 0-7, D Fenton 1-0, ST O'Sullivan 0-3, KJ O'Sullivan 0-3, C Lowney 0-2, A O'Sullivan 0-2, V Lowney 0-1, Liam Harrington 0-1, C MacIlhinney 0-1.	Referee: M Collins (Clonakilty)

=== Round 1 ===
2 May 2015 Round 1	Nemo Rangers	1-18 - 0-10	Ilen Rovers	Sam Maguire Park, Dunmanway
	B O'Driscoll 1-3, L Connolly 0-5, P Kerrigan 0-4, D Niblock 0-3, A Cronin 0-1, J Masters 0-1, W Morgan 0-1.		K O'Sullivan 0-4, D Mac Eoin 0-3, S Leonard 0-2, C O'Driscoll 0-1.	Referee: J Bermingham (Bride Rovers)

2 May 2015 Round 1	Dohenys	1-11 - 0-10	Aghada	Páirc Uí Rinn, Cork
	D O'Donovan 1-0, M Quinn 0-3, J Carroll 0-2, D Healy 0-2, D Rice 0-1, P McCarthy 0-1, E Lavers 0-1, T Collins 0-1.		J Looney 0-3, P O'Neill 0-3, J Donoghue 0-1, A Berry 0-1, S O'Keeffe 0-1, T Hartnett 0-1.	Referee: K Murphy (Nemo Rangers)

3 May 2015 Round 1	Newcestown	0-16 - 0-08	Clonakilty	Sam Maguire Park, Dunmanway
	D Twomey 0-6, J Desmond 0-3, T Twomey 0-3, C Keane 0-2, L Meade 0-1, M Kelly 0-1.		J O'Mahony 0-2, G Murray 0-2, S McEvoy 0-2, D O'Regan 0-1, T Anglin 0-1.	Referee: J Dorgan (Nemo Rangers)

4 May 2015 Round 1	Bishopstown	2-14 - 2-11	O'Donovan Rossa	Ahamilla Grounds, Clonakilty
	F Ó Deasúnaigh 1-6, S Oakes 0-5, C Dorman 1-0, D Lester 0-1, D O'Donovan 0-1, J O'Shea 0-1.		K Davis 0-7, D Óg Hodnett 1-1, D Shanahan 1-0, T Hegarty 0-1, S Crowley 0-1, R Long 0-1.	Referee: D Murnane (Macroom)

4 May 2015 Round 1	Ballincollig	1-15 - 1-12	St. Finbarr's	Páirc Uí Rinn, Cork
	P Kelly 1-1, C Kiely 0-4, C Dorgan 0-3, J Kelly 0-3, J Miskella 0-2, S Kiely 0-1, C O'Sullivan 0-1.		E Finn 0-6, C Madden 0-4, R Leahy 1-0, J Burns 0-1, C Lyons 0-1.	Referee: C Lane (Banteer)

4 May 2015 Round 1	Valley Rovers	2-10 - 0-14	Carbery Rangers	Henry Ford Park, Ballinascarthy
	F Lynch 1-4, D Crowley 1-1, J Cottrell 0-3, J Murphy 0-1, D Lordan 0-1.		J Hayes 0-5, R Kiely 0-3, S Hayes 0-3, J Fitzpatrick 0-1, B Shanahan 0-1, K Fitzpatrick 0-1.	Referee: K Murphy (Nemo Rangers)

9 May 2015 Round 1	Castlehaven	2-12 - 0-09	Clyda Rovers	Carrigadrohid
	B Hurley 1-7, S Dineen 1-0, M Collins 0-3, S Cahalane 0-1, S Hurley 0-1.		J Murphy 0-7, Cian O'Sullivan 0-1, C Flanagan 0-1.	Referee: N Wall (Carrigaline)

9 May 2015 Round 1	Douglas	2-09 - 1-07	St. Nicholas'	Páirc Uí Rinn, Cork
	G Griffin 1-3, E O'Sullivan 1-0, D Hanrahan 0-2, E Cadogan 0-1, E Mulrooney 0-1, M Dolan 0-1, L McGrath 0-1.		R McCarthy-Coade 0-4, David Brosnan 1-0, A Lynch 0-1, Dean Brosnan 0-1, G Kennefick 0-1.	Referee: M Collins (Clonakilty)

=== Round 2 ===
17 May 2015 Round 2	Carbery Rangers	1-07 - 0-08	Clyda Rovers	Coachford Pitch, Coachford
	D Hayes 1-1, S Hayes 0-2, J Fitzpatrick 0-1, K Fitzpatrick 0-1, C O'Donovan 0-1, J Hayes 0-1.		J Murphy 0-4, C Flanagan 0-2, C O'Sullivan 0-2.	Referee: J Bermingham (Bride Rovers)

24 May 2015 Round 2	O'Donovan Rossa	2-15 - 0-10	Clonakilty	Rosscarbery
	K Davis 0-5, P Crowley 1-1, S Shannon 0-4, M Collins 1-0, R Long 0-1, S Carmody 0-1, C McCarthy 0-1, D Óg Hodnett 0-1, T Hegarty 0-1.		B O'Mahony 0-5, T Anglin 0-2, T Clancy 0-1, D O'Regan 0-1, J O'Mahony 0-1.	Referee: C Lane (Bnateer)

30 May 2015 Round 2	St. Finbarr's	0-11 - 0-08	Aghada	Páirc Shéamuis de Barra, Carrigtwohill
	R Leahy 0-3, C Madden 0-2, C Lyons 0-2, J Burns 0-1, E Dennehy 0-1, E Comyns 0-1.		P O'Neill 0-2, A Berry 0-2, T O'Neill 0-1, T Hartnett 0-1, C Power 0-1, J Looney 0-1.

30 May 2015 Round 2	Ilen Rovers	1-19 - 1-11	St. Nicholas'	St. Mary's Park, Enniskean
	D Mac Eoin 1-6, A Holland 0-4, K o'Sullivan 0-4, S Leonard 0-3, S O'Donovan 0-2.		E Kearney 0-4, L Coughlan 1-0, B O'Donovan 0-2, D Brosnan 0-1, R McCarthy-Coade 0-1, G Kennefick 0-1, K McEnery 0-1, C McCarthy 0-1.	Referee: J Ryan (Macroom)

=== Round 3 ===
20 June 2015 Round 3	St. Nicholas'	1-08 - 0-07	Clonakilty	Charlie Hurley Park, Bandon
	E Kearney 1-3, R McCarthy-Coade 0-4, K McEnery 0-1.		J O'Mahony 0-4, D Lyons 0-1, B O'Mahony 0-1, D Murphy 0-1.	Referee: P O'Leary (Kilmurry)

27 June 2015 Round 3	Clyda Rovers	0-12 - 0-07	Aghada	Watergrasshill
	J Murphy 0-7, C Flanagan 0-3, P Kissane 0-1, C Buckley 0-1.		P O'Neill 0-3, T O'Neill 0-2, J Looney 0-1, A Berry 0-1.	Referee: D O'Leary (Kiskeam)

=== Relegation playoff ===
27 September 2019 Playoff	Clonakilty	3-13 - 0-09	Aghada	Brinny Sportsfield, Brinny
	J Leahy 1-4, I Falvey 1-1, D Lowney 1-0, R Mannix 0-2, T Clancy 0-2, S White 0-2, G Barry 0-1, J O'Mahony 0-1.		P O'Neill 0-3, J O'Shea 0-2, J O'Shea 0-2, A Barry 0-1, J O'Donoghue 0-1.	Referee: J Dorgan (Nemo Rangers)

=== Round 4 ===
8 August 2015 Round 4	Carbery Rangers	4-10 - 1-04	Ilen Rovers	Rossa Park, Skibbereen
	J Hayes 1-5, A Jennings 1-2, J O'Rourke 1-1, K Fitzpatrick 1-0, S Hayes 0-2.		K O'Sullivan 1-2, D Mac Eoin 0-2.	Referee: K Murphy (Nemo Rangers)

9 August 2015 Round 4	Nemo Rangers	0-13 - 1-10	Douglas	Páirc Uí Rinn, Cork
	P Kerrigan 0-4, J Masters 0-4, A O'Donovan 0-1, C Dalton 0-1, B O'Driscoll 0-1, M Dorgan 0-1, D O'Donovan 0-1.		E O'Sullivan 1-0, A Cadogan 0-3, M Dolan 0-2, S Powter 0-2, G Griffin 0-2, C Kingston 0-1.	Referee: M Collins (Clonakilty)

9 August 2015 Round 4	O'Donovan Rossa	2-11 - 0-07	Beara	Wolfe Tone Park, Bantry
	K Davis 1-5, R Long 1-1, D Óg Hodnett 0-3, P Crowley 0-1, D Shannon 0-1.		BJ O'Sullivan 0-3, G Murphy 0-2, S McCarthy 0-1, E Murphy 0-1, A O'Sullivan 0-1.	Referee: D Murnane (Macroom)

15 August 2015 Round 4	St. Nicholas'	2-09 - 0-15	Dohenys	Charlie Hurley Park, Bandon
	E Kearney 1-2, B O'Donovan 1-2, Dean Brosnan 0-3, K McEnery 0-1, L Coughlan 0-1.		D Healy 0-4, M Quinn 0-4, M Buckley 0-2, D Collins 0-1, D Rice 0-1, J Carroll 0-1, P McCarthy 0-1, J McCarthy 0-1.	Referee: J Bermingham (Bride Rovers)

16 August 2015 Round 4	Duhallow	1-11 - 0-09	Newcestown	Carrigadrohid
	D Scannell 1-2, J O'Connor 0-4, D O'Connor 0-2, J Corkery 0-1, S Hickey 0-1, A O'Connor 0-1.		D Twomey 0-5, C Keane 0-1, L Meade 0-1, J Curran 0-1, T Twomey 0-1.	Referee: J Ryan (Macroom)

22 August 2015 Round 4	Ballincollig	0-13 - 0-08	Valley Rovers	Kilmurry
	C Dorgan 0-6, S Kiely 0-2, G Durrant 0-2, D Kierstein 0-1, P Kelly 0-1, J Kelly 0-1.		H O'Donovan 0-5, K Canty 0-2, D Murphy 0-1.	Referee: D O'Leary (Kiskeam)

22 August 2015 Round 4	Bishopstown	1-09 - 0-08	Clyda Rovers	Páirc Uí Rinn, Cork
	F Ó Deasmhúnaigh 1-0, K O'Halloran 0-2, C Dorman 0-2, B Coffey 0-1, J McLoughlin 0-1, P Honohan 0-1, S Oakes 0-1, J O'Sullivan 0-1.		J Murphy 0-6, C O'Sullivan 0-1, C Flanagan 0-1.	Referee: P O'Leary (Kilmurry)

23 August 2015 Round 4 replay	St. Nicholas'	1-05 - 0-07	Dohenys	Charlie Hurley Park, Bandon
	E Kearney 1-0, B O'Donovan 0-2, R Brosnan 0-2, Dean Brosnan 0-1.		M Quinn 0-2, D Collins 0-1, D Healy 0-1, D Rice 0-1, T Collins 0-1, M Buckley 0-1.	Referee: J Ryan (Macroom)

29 August 2015 Round 4	Castlehaven	1-14 - 1-10	St. Finbarr's	Ahamilla Grounds, Clonakilty
	S Cahalane 0-4, M Hurley 1-0, S Hurley 0-2, S Nolan 0-2, S Collins 0-1, Damien Cahalane 0-1, R Whelton 0-1, C Hayes 0-1, Darragh Cahalane 0-1, P Hurley 0-1.		R Leahy 1-1, A Murphy 0-4, E Finn 0-2, S Sherlock 0-2, A O'Connor 0-1.	Referee: C Lane (Banteer)

29 August 2015 Round 4 replay	Nemo Rangers	1-15 - 0-11	Douglas	Páirc Uí Rinn, Cork
	P Kerrigan 0-4, C Dalton 1-0, B O'Driscoll 0-3, J Masters 0-3, D Mehigan 0-1, A O'Donovan 0-1, A Cronin 0-1, D Niblock 0-1, C Horgan 0-1.		A Cadogan 0-4, S Powter 0-2, D Hanrahan 0-1, J Lane 0-1, P Shine 0-1, C Kingston 0-1, G Griffin 0-1.	Referee: E Sheehy (Newcestown)

=== Quarter-finals ===
29 August 2015 Quarter-final	O'Donovan Rossa	2-15 - 1-10	Bishopstown	Sam Maguire Park, Dunmanway
	T Hegarty 1-3, K Davis 0-4, R Long 1-0, D Shannon 0-3, D Óg Hodnett 0-3, R Hodnett 0-1, S Carmody 0-1.		P Honohan 1-3, F Ó Deasmhúnaigh 0-2, C Dorman 0-2, B Coffey 0-1, D O'Donovan 0-1, D O'Connor 0-1.	Referee: P O'Leray (Kiskeam)

12 September 2015 Quarter-final	Castlehaven	1-14 - 1-11	Ballincollig	Sam Maguire Park, Dunmanway
	B Hurley 1-6, M Hurley 0-3, S Hurley 0-2, R Whelton 0-1, C Hayes 0-1, M Collins 0-1.		C Dorgan 1-4, J Miskella 0-2, C Moore 0-1, JP Murphy 0-1, S Kiely 0-1, P Kelly 0-1, C Kiely 0-1.	Referee: J Bermingham (Bride Rovers)

13 September 2015 Quarter-final	Nemo Rangers	5-11 - 0-03	St. Nicholas'	Páirc Uí Rinn, Cork
	P Kerrigan 3-3, C Horgan 1-2, J Masters 1-1, C Dalton 0-2, B O'Driscoll 0-1, L Connolly 0-1, D Niblock 0-1.		B O'Donovan 0-2, R McCarthy-Coade 0-1.	Referee: C Lane (Banteer)

13 September 2015 Quarter-final	Carbery Rangers	1-16 - 1-07	Duhallow	Páirc Uí Rinn, Cork
	J O'Rourke 1-5, K McMahon 0-3, A Jennings 0-3, J Hayes 0-2, R Kiely 0-1, K Fitzpatrick 0-1, B Shanahan 0-1.		D O'Connor 1-1, D Scannell 0-2, A O'Connor 0-1, J Corkery 0-1, S Murphy 0-1, K Holland 0-1.	Referee: D Murnane (Macroom)

=== Semi-finals ===
4 October 2015 Semi-final	Castlehaven	1-13 - 1-10	O'Donovan Rossa	Páirc Uí Rinn, Cork
	B Hurley 1-5, P Hurley 0-2, S Dineen 0-1, M Hurley 0-1, S Hurley 0-1, D Cahalane 0-1, S Nolan 0-1, M Collins 0-1.		C McCarthy 1-1, D Óg Hodnett 0-4, K Davis 0-2, D Hazel 0-1, P Crowley 0-1, T Hegarty 0-1.	Referee: K Murphy (Nemo Rangers)

4 October 2015 Semi-final	Nemo Rangers	1-11 - 0-13	Carbery Rangers	Páirc Uí Rinn, Cork
	L Connolly 0-6, P Kerrigan 1-1, J Masters 0-3, A O'Donovan 0-1.		J Hayes 0-5, S Hayes 0-3, B Shanahan 0-2, J O'Rourke 0-2, K McMahon 0-1.	Referee: C Lane (Banteer)

=== Finals ===
18 October 2015 Final	Nemo Rangers	0-10 - 0-10	Castlehaven	Páirc Uí Rinn, Cork
5:00pm	B O’Driscoll (0-3, 1 free); J Masters (frees), P Kerrigan (0-2 each); L Connolly (45), J Donovan, D Mehigan (0-1 each).	Report	B Hurley (frees), M Collins (0-3 each); M Hurley (0-2); S Nolan, D Cahalane (0-1 each).	Referee: C Lane (Banteer)

25 October 2015 Final Replay	Nemo Rangers	1-10 - 0-11	Castlehaven	Páirc Uí Rinn, Cork
3:30pm	P Kerrigan (0-4, 2 frees), B. O’Driscoll (1-1), J. Masters (0-2, 1 free), A. Cronin, D Mehigan, C Horgan (0-1 each).	Report	B Hurley (0-3, frees), M Collins (0-2), C Hayes, S Hurley, Seanie Cahalane, Darragh Cahalane, Conor Cahalane (0-1 each), A O’Reilly (own-point, 0-1).	Referee: J Bermingham (Bride Rovers)

== Championship statistics ==
=== Top scorers ===
Top scorers overall

Rank	Player	Club	Tally	Total	Matches	Average
1	Paul Kerrigan	Nemo Rangers	4-22	34	7	4.85
2	Brian Hurley	Castlehaven	3-24	33	5	6.60
3	Kevin Davis	O'Donovan Rossa	1-23	26	5	5.20
4	James Murphy	Clyda Rovers	0-24	24	4	6.00
5	John Hayes	Carbery Rangers	1-18	21	5	4.20
6	James Masters	Nemo Rangers	1-16	19	7	2.71
7	Evan Kearney	St. Nicholas'	3-09	18	6	3.00
7	Barry O'Driscoll	Nemo Rangers	2-12	18	7	2.57
8	Donncha O'Connor	Duhallow	1-14	17	3	5.66
9	Cian Dorgan	Ballincollig	1-13	16	3	5.33

Top scorers in a single game

Rank	Player	Club	Tally	Total	Opposition
1	Paul Kerrigan	Nemo Rangers	3-03	12	St. Nicholas'
2	Brian Hurley	Castlehaven	1-07	10	Clyda Rovers
2	Donncha O'Connor	Duhallow	0-10	10	Muskerry
3	Fiachra Ó Deasmhúnaigh	Bishopstown	1-06	9	O'Donovan Rossa
3	Dan Mac Eoin	Ilen Rovers	1-06	9	St. Nicholas'
3	Brian Hurley	Castlehaven	1-06	9	Ballincollig
3	Conor Cox	UCC	0-09	9	Beara
4	John Hayes	Carbery Rangers	1-05	8	Ilen Rovers
4	Kevin Davis	O'Donovan Rossa	1-05	8	Beara
4	John O'Rourke	Carbery Rangers	1-05	8	Duhallow
4	Brian Hurley	Castlehaven	1-05	8	O'Donovan Rossa
4	J. P. Murphy	Seandún	0-08	8	Beara

=== Miscellaneous ===
- Nemo Rangers win their first title since 2010.
