= Micheál O'Sullivan =

Irish Gaelic footballer (born 1977)

Personal information
- Native name: Micheál Ó Súilleabháin (Irish)
- Nickname: Haulie
- Born: 11 March 1977 (age 49) Rosscarbery, County Cork, Ireland
- Occupation: Secondary school teacher
- Height: 6 ft 3 in (191 cm)

Sport
- Sport: Gaelic football
- Position: Midfield
Clubs
Years	Club	Apps (scores)
1994-2019 1996-2005	Carbery Rangers → Carbery	28 (0-09); 25 (0-06)
Club titles
- Cork titles: 1
College
- Years: College
- 1995-1999: University of Limerick
College titles
- Sigerson titles: 0
Inter-county*
Years	County	Apps (scores)
1998-2004	Cork	16 (0-04)
Inter-county titles
- Munster titles: 2
- All-Irelands: 0
- NFL: 1
- All Stars: 0
- *Inter County team apps and scores correct as of 20:36, 25 November 2013.

Micheál "Haulie" O'Sullivan (born 11 March 1977) is an Irish Gaelic football manager and former player. He played for club side Carbery Rangers, at divisional level with Carbery and at inter-county level with the Cork senior football team.

== Club career ==
O'Sullivan began his club career at juvenile and underage levels with the Carbery Rangers club, while also lining out as a schoolboy with Mount St Michael Secondary School in Rosscarbery. He won a South West U21FC title in 1995, by which stage he had already progressed to the club's junior team. O'Sullivan won his first South West JAFC title in 1998.

It was around this time that O'Sullivan also lined out as a student with University of Limerick. After being part of the first team from the university to reach a Sigerson Cup final in 1997, but ultimately losing out to Tralee RTC, he was later part of the UL team that was denied a Limerick SFC title after an objection by Galbally. O'Sullivan claimed a Limerick SFC medal in 1998 following UL's defeat of Fr Casey's in the final.

After returning to Carbery Rangers, O'Sullivan won a second South West JAFC before later being part of the team that beat Cill na Martra to win the Cork JAFC title in 2003. He later claimed a Munster Club JFC medal, however, Carbery Rangers lost the 2004 All-Ireland junior club final to Wolfe Tones. O'Sullivan added a Munster Club IFC medal to his collection in 2004 before later securing All-Ireland honours after beating Pomeroy Plunketts in the 2005 All-Ireland intermediate club final. He was team captain later that year when Carbery Rangers won the Cork IFC title after a defeat of Glanmire in the 2005 final. O'Sullivan later added a second successive Munster Club IFC medal to his collection when Carbery Rangers became the first club to retain the title.

O'Sullivan's club successes resulted in a call-up to the Carbery divisional team. He was captain of the team when Carbery beat Bishopstown by 1-11 to 0-07 to win the Cork SFC medal in the 2004 final. His tenure with the divisional team ended shortly after this following Carbery Rangers's promotion to the senior ranks. O'Sullivan brought his senior club career to an end in 2012, however, he continued to line out on occasions in the junior ranks. His final club success was a South West JDFC title in 2019.

== Inter-county career ==
O'Sullivan never played at minor level for Cork, however, his performances for University of Limerick earned a call-up to the under-21 team in 1997. His two-year tenure in this grade ended with silverware, while his one-year association with the junior team in 1998 also ended without success.

O'Sullivan was one of a number of players promoted from the junior to the senior team and he made his debut during the 1998–99 National League. He claimed his first silverware with Cork after a defeat of Dublin in the league final. O'Sullivan made his Munster SFC debut against Waterford two weeks later and was at midfield when Cork beat Kerry in the 1999 Munster final. O'Sullivan was again at midfield when Cork suffered a 1-11 to 1-08 defeat by Meath in the 1999 All-Ireland final. He ended the season with an All-Star nomination.

As a mainstay of the team over the following few years, O'Sullivan collected a second Munster SFC winners' medal after a defeat of Tipperary in the 2002 Munster final replay. His last game for Cork was a defeat by Fermanagh in 2004.

== Management career ==
His career as a secondary school teacher has seen O'Sullivan coach at all levels with Clonakilty Community College. He was part of the coaching team when the college won five consecutive Munster Vocational Schools SAFC titles as well as All-Ireland honours in 2010. He was player-manager of the Carbery Rangers senior team in his final season as a player in 2012, before guiding the team to the 2014 final and a defeat by Ballincollig. After stepping away as Carbery Rangers manager in 2015, he became involved with the Dohenys club, however, he returned for a second spell in charge of Carbery Rangers between 2018 and 2020. O'Sullivan was coach of the Carbery divisional team that won the inaugural Tadhg Crowley Cup in 2022.

O'Sullivan was appointed manager of the Cork under-15 development team in January 2022. He progressed with this team as under-16 manager before being appointed Cork minor football team manager in November 2023.

== Career statistics ==
=== Club ===
Team	Year	Cork SFC	
Team	Year	Apps	Score
Carbery Rangers	2006	2	0-01
Carbery Rangers	2007	5	0-01
Carbery Rangers	2008	2	0-00
Carbery Rangers	2009	4	0-01
Carbery Rangers	2010	6	0-04
Carbery Rangers	2011	5	0-02
Carbery Rangers	2012	4	0-00
Career total		28	0-09

=== Division ===
Team	Year	Cork SFC	
Team	Year	Apps	Score
Carbery	1996	1	0-00
Carbery	1997	2	0-00
Carbery	1998	3	0-01
Carbery	1999	2	0-00
Carbery	2000	4	0-01
Carbery	2001	4	0-01
Carbery	2002	2	0-01
Carbery	2003	0	0-00
Carbery	2004	7	0-02
Carbery	2005	0	0-00
Career total		25	0-06

=== Inter-county ===
Team	Season	National League			Munster		All-Ireland		Total	
Team	Season	Division	Apps	Score	Apps	Score	Apps	Score	Apps	Score
Cork	1998-99	Division 1A	7	0-02	3	0-01	2	0-00	12	0-03
Cork	1999-00	Division 1A	7	2-02	1	0-00	—		8	2-02
Cork	2000-01	Division 2A	5	0-01	3	0-02	1	0-00	9	0-03
Cork	2002	Division 1A	6	1-00	3	0-00	0	0-00	9	1-00
Cork	2003	Division 1A	0	0-00	0	0-00	0	0-00	0	0-00
Cork	2004	Division 1A	4	0-01	1	0-01	2	0-00	7	0-02
Career total			29	3-06	11	0-04	5	0-00	45	3-10

== Honours ==
=== Player ===
University of Limerick

- Limerick Senior Football Championship: 1998

Carbery Rangers

- All-Ireland Intermediate Club Football Championship: 2005
- Munster Intermediate Club Football Championship: 2004, 2005
- Cork Intermediate Football Championship: 2005 (c)
- Munster Junior Club Football Championship: 2003
- Cork Junior Football Championship: 2003
- South West Junior A Football Championship: 1998, 2003
- South West Junior D Football Championship: 2019
- South West Under-21 Football Championship: 1995

Carbery

- Cork Senior Football Championship: 2004 (c)

Cork

- Munster Senior Football Championship: 1999, 2002
- National Football League: 1998–99

=== Management ===
Clonakilty Community College

- Simcox Cup: 2026
- All-Ireland Vocational Schools Senior A Football Championship: 2010
- Munster Vocational Schools Senior A Football Championship: 2009, 2010, 2011, 2012, 2013

Carbery

- Tadhg Crowley Cup: 2022

Sporting positions
Preceded by Ray O'Mahony	Cork minor football team manager 2023-2024	Succeeded by Keith Ricken
