= 2010 Cork Senior Football Championship =

Gaelic football competition

- Dates: 5 April 2010 – 24 October 2010
- Teams: 26
- Sponsor: Evening Echo
- Champions: Nemo Rangers (18th title); Brian Morgan (captain); Eddie Kirwan (manager)
- Runners-up: St. Finbarr's; Jim O'Donoghue (captain); Tony Leahy (manager)
- Relegated: Naomh Abán

Tournament statistics
- Matches played: 40
- Top scorer(s): Donncha O'Connor (0-30)

The 2010 Cork Senior Football Championship was the 112th staging of the Cork Senior Football Championship since its establishment by the Cork County Board in 1887. The draw for the opening round fixtures took place on 13 December 2009. The championship began on 5 April 2010 and ended on 24 October 2010.

Clonakilty entered the championship as the defending champions, however, they were defeated by Nemo Rangers at the semi-final stage.

On 24 October 2010, Nemo Rangers won the championship following a 2–10 to 1–08 defeat of St. Finbarr's in the final. This was their 18th championship title overall and their first title since 2008.

Duhallow's Donncha O'Connor was the championship's top scorer with 0-30.

== Team changes ==
=== To Championship ===
Promoted from the Cork Premier Intermediate Football Championship

- Valley Rovers

=== From Championship ===
Relegated to the Cork Premier Intermediate Football Championship

- Mallow

== Results ==
=== Divisional section ===
5 April 2010 Round 1	Duhallow	0-11 - 0-07	Avondhu	Dromtarriffe GAA Grounds, Dromtarriffe
	D O'Connor 0-8, G Murphy 0-2, N Fleming 0-1.		A O'Brien 0-3, M O'Brien 0-2, S Beston 0-1, T Monaghan 0-1.	Referee: P O'Leary (Kilmurry)

5 April 2010 Round 1	Muskerry	0-10 - 0-06	Beara	Sam Maguire Park, Dunmanway
	L Shorten 0-3, F Goold 0-3, A Concannon 0-2, D Goold 0-1, M Murphy 0-1.		KJ O'Sullivan 0-2, D Murphy 0-1, J Horgan 0-1, S O'Sullivan 0-1, J Goggin 0-1.	Referee: C Lane (Banteer)

5 April 2010 Round 1	Carbery	1-14 - 0-07	Imokilly	Páirc Liam Mhic Cárthaigh, Ballygarvan
	C Daly 0-5, T Twomey 1-1, C O'Driscoll 0-2, S Keohane 0-1, A O'Connor 0-1, K O'Driscoll 0-1, D Barron 0-1, D O'Donovan 0-1, B Horgan 0-1.		D Ryan 0-4, M Hickey 0-2, J Cronin 0-1.	Referee: C Lyons (Nemo Rangers)

5 April 2010 Round 1	Carrigdhoun	0-08 - 1-11	Seandún	Páirc Uí Rinn, Cork
	B O'Keeffe 0-3, B Coughlan 0-2, E Murphy 0-1, M O'Sullivan 0-1, D Bouse 0-1.		JP Murphy 0-5, E Hegarty 1-0, M Mulconroy 0-3, P O'Sullivan 0-1, E Buckley 0-1, S Rae 0-1.	Referee: G Sweeney (Glenville)

18 April 2010 Round 2	Duhallow	1-14 - 0-10	Muskerry	Dromtarriffe GAA Grounds, Dromtarriffe
	D O'Connor 0-7, J Lane 1-1, G Murphy 0-3, N Fleming 0-1, B Daly 0-1, TJ Bodie 0-1.		A Concannon 0-4, L Shorten 0-2, D Goold 0-2, J Carey 0-1, F Goold 0-1.	Referee: J Dorgan (Nemo Rangers)

18 April 2010 Round 2	Carbery	0-15 - 2-09	Seandún	Brinny Sportsfield, Brinny
	C Daly 0-6, D Barron 0-5, K Coffey 0-2, K O'Driscoll 0-1, C O'Driscoll 0-1.		JP Murphy 0-7, B Barrett 1-0, C McCarthy 1-0, E Buckley 0-1, C Buckley 0-1.	Referee: P O'Leary (Kilmurry)

27 April 2010 Round 2 replay	Carbery	1-13 - 1-08	Seandún	Brinny Sportsfield, Brinny
	C Daly 1-5, D Barron 0-3, D O'Donovan 0-2, A O'Connor 0-1, F Keane 0-1, C O'Driscoll 0-1.		JP Murphy 0-6, B Barrett 1-0, D O'Regan 0-1, C Brosnan 0-1.	Referee: D Forde (Donoughmore)

14 June 2010 Round 3	Duhallow	1-11 - 0-13	University College Cork	Mallow GAA Complex, Mallow
	AJ O'Connor 1-0, D Murphy 0-3, D O'Connor 0-2, S Lenihan 0-1, B Daly 0-1, S Sullivan 0-1, S Hickey 0-1, N Fleming 0-1, TJ Bodie 0-1.		D Casey 0-4, JB Spillane 0-3, A Greaney 0-2, P Crowley 0-1, J Buckley 0-1, R O'Hagan 0-1, S Hannifin 0-1.	Referee: G Sweeney (Glenville)

23 June 2010 Round 3	Carbery	1-14 - 0-16 (aet)	Cork Institute of Technology	Ovens
	D Barron 0-5, D O'Donovan 0-4, M Sugrue 1-0, A O'Connor 0-1, K Harrington 0-1, C O'Driscoll 0-1, T Twomey 0-1, C Daly 0-1.		D Goulding 0-9, C O'Neill 0-5, B Kelleher 0-1, C Sheehan 0-1.	Referee: C Lane (Banteer)

=== Round 1 ===
14 May 2010 Round 1	Aghada	1-15 - 0-09	Na Piarsaigh	Clonmult Memorial Park, Midleton
	C Fleming 1-6, P O'Neill 0-2, M Russell 0-2, J O'Connell 0-2, T O'Keeffe 0-1, S O'Keeffe 0-1, K O'Connor 0-1.		C Lynch 0-3, J Gardiner 0-2, C O'Mahony 0-2, S Duggan 0-1, K Buckley 0-1.	Referee: M Collins (Clonakilty)

15 May 2010 Round 1	St. Nicholas'	1-06 - 1-10	Castlehaven	Ahamilla Grounds, Clonakilty
	R Brosnan 1-1, G Moylan 0-2, D O'Callaghan 0-2, Dean Brosnan 0-1.		M Collins 1-1, S Hurley 0-3, P Hurley 0-2, D Hegarty 0-1, A Cahalane 0-1, B Hurley 0-1, S Cahalane 0-1.	Referee: G Harrington (Carrigaline)

15 May 2010 Round 1	Nemo Rangers	2-17 - 1-04	Naomh Abán	Coachford Pitch, Coachford
	J Masters 0-7, A Cronin 1-3, D Mehigan 1-1, P Kerrigan 0-3, W Morgan 0-2, D Niblock 0-1.		A Hankus 1-1, M Ó Cróinín 0-1, D O'Sullivan 0-1, J McCarthy 0-1.	Referee: C Lane (Banteer)

16 May 2010 Round 1	St. Finbarr's	1-09 - 0-08	Carbery Rangers	Charlie Hurley Park, Bandon
	J O'Donoghue 1-1, C McCarthy 0-3, R Leahy 0-2, J Sexton 0-1, R O'Mahony 0-1, C O'Sullivan 0-1.		J Hayes 0-4, N Hayes 0-1, S Hayes 0-1, S Fitzpatrick 0-1, J Murphy 0-1.	Referee: G Sweeney (Glanville)

16 May 2010 Round 1	Ilen Rovers	0-12 - 1-08 (aet)	O'Donovan Rossa	John William Park, Leap
	K O'Sullivan 0-8, K Daly 0-2, C O'Driscoll 0-1, D O'Donovan 0-1.		D Óg Hodnett 1-4, G Minihane 0-2, C Crowley 0-1, C McCarthy 0-1.	Referee: J Dorgan (Nemo Rangers)

16 May 2010 Round 1	Bishopstown	1-11 - 0-09	Valley Rovers	Páirc Liam Mhic Cárthaigh, Ballygarvan
	P O'Connor 0-5, D Hickey 1-0, P Honohan 0-2, B Harty 0-2, B Healy 0-1, S Kenny 0-1.		F Lynch 0-2, E Manning 0-2, H O'Donovan 0-2, B Lehane 0-1, D Coughlan 0-1, R Lehane 0-1.	Referee: C McAllister (Aghada)

16 May 2010 Round 1	Douglas	0-15 - 2-08	Ballincollig	Ovens
	M Harrington 0-6, S McCarthy 0-5, J Farrell 0-2, J Lane 0-1, O Mulrooney 0-1.		P O'Mahony 1-4, N Allen 1-1, JP Murphy 0-1, J Kelly 0-1, P Kelly 0-1.	Referee: N Barrett (Carrigtwohill)

16 May 2010 Round 1	Clonakilty	1-08 - 0-06	Dohenys	Rossmore Grounds, Rossmore
	Timmy Anglin 1-0, C McManus 0-3, C O'Donovan 0-3, M O'Brien 0-1, Howard Kenny 0-1.		G McCarthy 0-4, M O'Donovan 0-1, D O'Donovan 0-1.	Referee: C Lyons (Nemo Rangers)

=== Round 2 ===
12 June 2010 Round 2	Dohenys	2-14 - 1-06	Naomh Abán	Castle Grounds, Macroom
	M Milner 1-1, P McCarthy 1-1, G McCarthy 0-4, A Sheehan 0-2, T O'Donovan 0-2, P Collins 0-1, D Healy 0-1, M Farr 0-1, D O'Donovan 0-1.		J Mac Cárthaigh 1-1, M Ó Cróinín 0-2, S Ó Laoighire 0-2, S Mac Cárthaigh 0-1.	Referee: J Dorgan (Nemo Rangers)

13 June 2010 Round 2	Na Piarsaigh	0-10 - 2-08	St. Nicholas'	Páirc Uí Rinn, Cork
	J Gardiner 0-3, C Lynch 0-3, C O'Mahony 0-2, S Duggan 0-1, P O'Rourke 0-1.		R Brosnan 0-5, G Moylan 1-1, D O'Callaghan 1-0, David Brosnan 0-1, G Callanan 0-1.	Referee: C Lane (Banteer)

18 June 2010 Round 2	Ballincollig	3-09 - 0-09	Carbery Rangers	Brinny Sportsfield, Brinny
	I Coughlan 2-2, N Allen 1-0, J Miskella 0-2, D McCarthy 0-1, A Donovan 0-1, P Kelly 0-1, J Kelly 0-1, P O'Mahony 0-1.		J Hayes 0-4, K McMahon 0-2, S Hayes 0-1, J O'Rourke 0-1, S Hayes 0-1.	Referee: J Dorgan (Nemo Rangers)

19 June 2010 Round 2	Valley Rovers	1-08 - 0-13	O'Donovan Rossa	Páirc Naomh Eoin, Newcestown
	S Nolan 1-1, H O'Donovan 0-4, K Canty 0-1, G Rice 0-1, J Hurley 0-1.		D Óg Hodnett 0-4, E Hodnett 0-2, R McCarthy 0-2, R Long 0-1, G Minihane 0-1, S Crowley 0-1, C McCarthy 0-1, D O'Sullivan 0-1.	Referee: G Sweeney (Glenville)

=== Round 3 ===
27 June 2010 Round 3	Carbery Rangers	0-15 - 0-04	Na Piarsaigh	Charlie Hurley Park, Bandon
	J Hayes 0-5, S Hayes 0-3, M O'Sullivan 0-2, J Fitzpatrick 0-2, B Shanahan 0-1, M Moore 0-1, A Jennings 0-1.		C O'Mahony 0-2, M Prendergast 0-1, D Gardiner 0-1.	Referee: N Barrett (Carrigtwohill)

27 June 2010 Round 3	Valley Rovers	1-10 - 1-08	Naomh Abán	GAA Pavilion, Carrigadrohid
	F Lynch 1-1, H O'Donovan 0-3, J Hurley 0-2, E Manning 0-1, R Lehane 0-1, S Nolan 0-1, G Rice 0-1.		M Ó Cróinín 1-4, D Ó Súilleabháin 0-1, G Mór Ó Loingsigh 0-1, S Ó Laoighire 0-1, J Mac Cárthaigh 0-1.	Referee: J Dorgan (Nemo Rangers)

=== Relegation play-off ===
24 September 2010 Play-off	Na Piarsaigh	2-14 - 1-16	Naomh Abán	Cloughduv
	S Glasgow 1-3, J Gardiner 0-5, G Sheehan 1-1, S Duggan 0-2, A Brady 0-1, W Long 0-1, K Buckley 0-1.		S Mac Cárthaigh 1-9, J Mac Cárthaigh 0-2, A Hankus 0-2, A Ó Cróinín 0-1, D Ó Cróinín 0-1, J Mac Cárthaigh 0-1.	Referee: J Bermingham (Bride Rovers)

=== Round 4 ===
6 August 2010 Round 4	Dohenys	0-08 - 1-14	Carbery Rangers	Rossmore Grounds, Rossmore
	M Milner 0-3, G McCarthy 0-3, A Sheehan 0-2.		J Hayes 1-4, J O'Rourke 0-4, M O'Sullivan 0-2, J Fitzpatrick 0-2, D Hayes 0-1, S Hayes 0-1.	Referee: J Dorgan (Nemo Rangers)

7 August 2010 Round 4	Clonakilty	2-09 - 0-13	Ilen Rovers	Rosscarbery
	P Griffin 2-0, C McManus 0-4, T Clancy 0-2, D Murphy 0-2, C O'Donovan 0-1.		D Mac Eoin 0-6, K Daly 0-3, B O'Sullivan 0-2, K O'Sullivan 0-1, C O'Driscoll 0-1.	Referee: C Lane (Banteer)

7 August 2010 Round 4	O'Donovan Rossa	1-09 - 2-07	St. Finbarr's	Sam Maguire Park, Dunmanway
	C McCarthy 0-5, P Crowley 1-0, D Long 0-1, R Long 0-1, G Minihane 0-1, D Óg Hodnett 0-1.		C McCarthy 1-2, J Sexton 1-1, R Leahy 0-3, C O'Sullivan 0-1.	Referee: J Bermingham (Bride Rovers)

8 August 2010 Round 4	Nemo Rangers	0-11 - 0-04	Valley Rovers	Páirc Liam Mhic Cárthaigh, Ballygarvan
	P Kerrigan 0-4, W Morgan 0-3, J Masters 0-2, B O'Driscoll 0-1, B O'Regan 0-1.		K Canty 0-2, F Lynch 0-1, H O'Donovan 0-1.

10 August 2010 Round 4	Bishopstown	0-08 - 0-09	St. Nicholas'	Páirc Uí Rinn, Cork
	B Harty 0-3, J Ferriter 0-2, G Walsh 0-2, B Healy 0-1.		R Brosnan 0-5, D Brosnan 0-2, P O'Brien 0-1, D O'Callaghan 0-1.	Referee: N Barrett (Carrigtwohill)

24 August 2010 Round 4	Aghada	1-09 - 2-08	Duhallow	Mourne Abbey
	C Fleming 1-6, E Healy 0-1, M Russell 0-1, B O'Flaherty 0-1.		N Fleming 1-1, D O'Connor 0-4, TJ Bodie 1-0, J McLoughlin 0-1, S Hickey 0-1, L McLoughlin 0-1.	Referee: K Murphy (Nemo Rangers)

24 August 2010 Round 4	Ballincollig	0-13 - 2-07	Castlehaven	Charlie Hurley Park, Bandon
	N Allen 0-3, P Kelly 0-3, J Miskella 0-2, A Donovan 0-2, I Coughlan 0-1, F Keohane 0-1, J Kelly 0-1.		S Cahalane 1-1, M Collins 1-1, S Hurley 0-3, B Hurley 0-2.	Referee: G Sweeney (Glenville)

24 August 2010 Round 4	Carbery	1-09 - 0-15	Douglas	Cloughduv
	A O'Connor 1-1, D Barron 0-3, K O'Driscoll 0-2, D O'Donovan 0-1, S Levis 0-1, C O'Driscoll 0-1.		M Harrington 0-6, C Dineen 0-2, J Farrell 0-2, A Barry 0-1, O Mulrooney 0-1, S McCarthy 0-1, N Heffernan 0-1, T Sheehan 0-1.	Referee: P O'Leary (Kilmurry)

26 September 2010 Round 4 replay	Ballincollig	3-10 - 2-09	Castlehaven	Charlie Hurley Park, Bandon
	I Coughlan 2-3, JP Murphy 1-0, P Kelly 0-2, J Miskella 0-2, N Allen 0-1, C O'Sullivan 0-1, P O'Mahony 0-1.		M Collins 1-2, S Cahalane 1-1, B Collins 0-2, D Cahalane 0-1, P Hurley 0-1, A Cahalane 0-1, D Burns 0-1.	Referee: C Lane (Banteer)

=== Quarter-finals ===
29 August 2010 Quarter-final	Nemo Rangers	5-17 - 1-05	St. Nicholas'	Páirc Uí Rinn, Cork
	P O'Driscoll 1-3, P Kerrigan 1-3, A Cronin 1-2, D Kearney 1-1, D Mehigan 1-0, D Niblock 0-3, J Masters 0-3, W Morgan 0-1, C O'Brien 0-1.		David Brosnan 1-0, R Brosnan 0-3, G Moylan 0-2.	Referee: C Lane (Lyre)

25 September 2010 Quarter-final	Clonakilty	1-10 - 0-12	Duhallow	Páirc Uí Rinn, Cork
	C McManus 0-5, S Nagle 1-0, P Griffin 0-2, C O'Donovan 0-1, D O'Regan 0-1, C Murphy 0-1.		D O'Connor 0-9, A Walsh 0-1, N Fleming 0-1, M Dilworth 0-1.	Referee: P O'Leary (Kilmurry)

3 October 2010 Quarter-final	Ballincollig	2-04 - 1-10	St. Finbarr's	Páirc Uí Rinn, Cork
	P O'Mahony 1-0, J Kelly 1-0, J Miskella 0-3, N Allen 0-1.		C McCarthy 1-1, R Leahy 0-3, J Sexton 0-2, N Horgan 0-1, C O'Sullivan 0-1, R O'Mahony 0-1, J O'Donoghue 0-1.	Referee: C Lane (Lyre)

9 October 2010 Quarter-final	Carbery Rangers	3-12 - 1-08	Douglas	Charlie Hurley Park, Bandon
	S Hayes 1-1, J Hayes 0-4, D Hayes 1-0, J McCarthy 1-0, J Fitzpatrick 0-2, J O'Rourke 0-2, J Murphy 0-2, K McMahon 0-1.		J Farrell 1-2, M Harrington 0-4, B Fitzgerald 0-1, N Heffernan 0-1.	Referee: G Sweeney (Glenville)

=== Semi-finals ===
10 October 2010 Semi-final	Nemo Rangers	2-13 - 1-10	Clonakilty	Páirc Uí Rinn, Cork
	P Kerrigan 1-3 (three frees); A Cronin 1-2; W Morgan 0-3; B O’Driscoll 0-2 (one free, one ‘45); P Morgan, D Niblock, S O’Brien 0-1 each.	Report	C O’Donovan 0-5 (four frees); C McManus (one free), P Griffin, D Murphy, C Calnan, F Coughlan 0-1 each.	Attendance: 2,340; Referee: J Bermingham (Bride Rovers)

16 October 2010 Semi-final	Carbery Rangers	0-08 - 1-11	St. Finbarr's	Páirc Uí Rinn, Cork
	J Hayes (0-4 two from frees), S Hayes (0-2), K McMahon (0-1), J O’Rourke (0-1).	Report	J Sexton (0-5, all frees), C McCarthy (1-1), C O’Sullivan (0-2), R Leahy (0-2), R O’Mahony (0-1).	Referee: P O'Leary

=== Final ===
24 October 2010 Final	Nemo Rangers	2-10 - 1-08	St. Finbarr's	Páirc Uí Chaoimh, Cork
	P Kerrigan 1-3 (two frees); B O’Driscoll 1-1; D Kearney, D Niblock, A Cronin 0-2 each.	Report	J Sexton (one sideline), R Leahy (two frees, one ‘45) 0-3 each; R O’Mahony 1-0; F Murray (one free), C O’Sullivan 0-1 each.	Attendance: 6,017; Referee: M Collins (Clonakilty)

== Championship statistics ==
=== Top scorers ===
Top scorers overall

Rank	Player	Club	Tally	Total	Matches	Average
1	Donncha O'Connor	Duhallow	0-30	30	5	6.00
2	John Hayes	Carbery Rangers	1-25	28	6	5.66
3	Paul Kerrigan	Nemo Rangers	3-16	25	5	5.00

Top scorers in a single game

Rank	Player	Club	Tally	Total	Opposition
1	Shane Mac Cárthaigh	Naomh Abán	1-09	12	Na Piarsaigh
2	Cian Fleming	Aghada	1-06	9	Duhallow
2	Cian Fleming	Aghada	1-06	9	Na Piarsaigh
2	Daniel Goulding	CIT	0-09	9	Carbery
2	Donncha O'Connor	Duhallow	0-09	9	Clonakilty
3	Ian Coughlan	Ballincollig	2-02	8	Carbery Rangers
3	Chris Daly	Carbery	1-05	8	Seandún
3	Donncha O'Connor	Duhallow	0-08	8	Avondhu
3	Kevin O'Sullivan	Ilen Rovers	0-08	8	O'Donovan Rossa
4	Mícheál Ó Cróinín	Naomh Abán	1-04	7	Valley Rovers
4	John Hayes	Carbery Rangers	1-04	7	Dohenys
4	Donal Óg Hodnett	O'Donovan Rossa	1-04	7	Ilen Rovers
4	Podsie O'Mahony	Ballincollig	1-04	7	Douglas
4	James Masters	Nemo Rangers	0-07	7	Naomh Abán
4	Donncha O'Connor	Duhallow	0-07	7	Muskerry
4	J. P. Murphy	Seandún	0-07	7	Carbery

=== Miscellaneous ===
- Nemo Rangers and St Finbarr's face each-other for the first time in the final.
