= 2005 Cork Intermediate Football Championship =

70th staging of the Cork Intermediate Football Championship

- Dates: 8 April - 23 October 2005
- Teams: 18
- Sponsor: Evening Echo
- Champions: Carbery Rangers (1st title); Micheál O'Sullivan (captain); Michael Paul Hicks (manager)
- Runners-up: Glanmire; Mark Hopkins (captain)

Tournament statistics
- Matches played: 29
- Goals scored: 48 (1.66 per match)
- Points scored: 532 (18.34 per match)
- Top scorer(s): James Murphy (4-26)

The 2005 Cork Intermediate Football Championship was the 70th staging of the Cork Intermediate Football Championship since its establishment by the Cork County Board. The draw for the opening fixtures took place on 12 December 2004. The championship ran from 8 April to 23 October 2005.

The final was played on 23 October 2005 at Páirc Uí Chaoimh in Cork, between Carbery Rangers and Glanmire, in what was their first ever meeting in the final. Carbery Rangers won the match by 1–13 to 2–05 to claim their first ever championship title.

== Results ==
=== First round ===
8 April 2005 First round	Macroom	1-09 - 1-08	Delaneys	Ovens Grounds
	F Gould 1-1, N Twomey 0-4, G McPolin 0-2, J Gould 0-2.		P O'Connell 0-4, D Dineen 1-0, K Foley 0-2, M O'Driscoll 0-1, G Quinlan 0-1.

8 April 2005 First round	Kiskeam	3-07 - 1-09	Aghabullogue	Millstreet Grounds
	N Cronin 1-3, P O'Leary 1-0, J Angland 1-0, B Dennehy 0-2, T Dennehy 0-2.		J Kelleher 0-5, P Kelleher 1-1, D O'Leary 0-2, E Twomey 0-1.

8 April 2005 First round	Cill na Martra	0-09 - 1-09	St. Vincent's	Carrigadrohid Grounds
	R Hoare 0-5, D Buckley 0-1, C Maughan 0-1, M O'Connor 0-1, C McSweeney 0-1.		D O'Connor 1-2, J Buckley 0-3, A Fenton 0-2, P O'Shea 0-1, JP Murphy 0-1.

8 April 2005 First round	Glenville	0-10 - 0-07	Carrigaline	Caherlag Grounds
	R Cahill 0-9, J Halbert 0-1.		B O'Keeffe 0-4, K O'Keeffe 0-3.

8 April 2005 First round	Newmarket	0-18 - 2-05	Castletownbere	Inchigeela Grounds
	SF O'Connor 0-6, T O'Keeffe 0-5, B O'Leary 0-3, M Feehan 0-2, T Murphy 0-1, B Daly 0-1.		A O'Regan 2-2, A O'Sullivan 0-2, S O'Regan 0-1.

13 April 2005 First round	Mayfield	1-07 - 0-09	Valley Rovers	Ballinhassig Grounds
	P Condon 0-5, L Crowley 1-0, J O'Donovan 0-1, E Crowley 0-1.		E Collins 0-3, F Lynch 0-2, K Canty 0-1, W Burke 0-1, M Kelleher 0-1, SM Collins 0-1.

14 April 2005 First round	Nemo Rangers	0-11 - 1-06	Glanmire	Caherlag Grounds
	C Corkery 0-5, E Weldon 0-3, J Kerins 0-1, M Kearney 0-1, P Morgan 0-1.		B O'Callaghan 1-0, M Hopkins 0-2, B Kirby 0-1, John Murphy 0-1, P Ryan 0-1, C Cummins 0-1.	Referee: D O'Farrell (Mitchelstown)

16 April 2005 First round	Carbery Rangers	0-10 - 0-09	Killavullen	Coachford Sportsfield
	J Murphy 0-5, M Moore 0-2, M Ronan 0-1, J Hayes 0-1, D Hayes 0-1.		D Luddy 0-3, A O'Driscoll 0-2, B Hayes 0-1, J O'Neill 0-1, L Dorgan 0-1, B O'Driscoll 0-1.

23 April 2005 First round	Ballinora	1-16 - 0-06	Fermoy	Páirc Uí Rinn
	G O'Halloran 1-2, C Brosnan 0-3, P Cantillon 0-2, J Fitton 0-2, M Murphy 0-2, D O'Neill 0-2, M Hurley 0-1, C Sheehan 0-1, E Lougheed 0-1.		D Galvin 0-3, I O'Callaghan 0-2, A O'Connor 0-1.

=== Second round ===
15 May 2005 Second round	Delaneys	1-09 - 1-14	Valley Rovers	Carrigaline GroundsF
	M McElhinney 1-0, G Quinlan 0-3, P O'Connell 0-3, M O'Driscoll 0-2, C Twomey 0-1.		W Burke 0-4, F Lynch 1-0, M Kelleher 0-3, R Butler 0-2, K Canty 0-2, SM Collins 0-2, D Lynch 0-1.

20 May 2005 Second round	Aghabullogue	2-10 - 2-10	Killavullen	Dromtarriffe Grounds
	A O'Driscoll 1-2, D Luddy 1-0, B Norris 0-2, J O'Mahony 0-2, I O'Driscoll 0-2, J O'Neill 0-1, C O'Connell 0-1.		J Kelleher 0-5, J Lucey 1-0, C Lucey 1-0, D Kiely 0-2, R O'Keeffe 0-2, D O'Leary 0-1.

5 June 2005 Second round	Fermoy	0-08 - 2-09	Castletownbere	Ballinacarriga
	N Lardner 0-6, P Howard 0-1, P Hickey 0-1.		B O'Regan 1-2, A O'Regan 1-2, S Harrington 0-2, S O'Regan 0-2, A O'Sullivan 0-1.

17 June 2005 Second round replay	Aghabullogue	0-08 - 1-08	Killavullen	Dromtarriffe Grounds
	J Kelleher 0-4, D O'Leary 0-2, D Kiely 0-1, N Buckley 0-1.		J O'Mahony 0-5, D Relihan 1-1, A O'Driscoll 0-1, T Foley 0-1.

25 June 2005 Second round	Carrigaline	1-05 - 1-05	Glanmire	Church Road
	T Burke 1-0, B O'Keeffe 0-3, E O'Sullivan 0-1, E Murphy 0-1.		D Holden 1-1, M Hopkins 0-1, B O'Callaghan 0-1, M Cussen 0-1, P Ryan 0-1.

16 July 2005 Second round replay	Carrigaline	2-11 - 3-11	Glanmire	Church Road
	J Mullany 1-2, K O'Keeffe 1-2, B O'Keeffe 0-2, E O'Sullivan 0-2, D Twomey 0-1, P Murphy 0-1, E Murphy 0-1.		James Murphy 2-1, M Hopkins 0-4, D Molden 1-0, P Ryan 0-3, F O'Reilly 0-1, P Meaney 0-1, B O'Connell 0-1.

- Cill na Martra received a bye in this round.

=== Third round ===
18 June 2005 Third round	Ballinora	1-07 - 0-12	Carbery Rangers	Henry Ford Park
	G O'Halloran 1-2, P Cantillon 0-2, C Brosnan 0-1, M Hurley 0-1, C Healy 0-1.		J Hayes 0-6, S Hayes 0-3, J Murphy 0-1, M Ronan 0-1, M Moore 0-1.

25 June 2005 Third round	Newmarket	2-11 - 1-12	Cill na Martra	Millstreet Grounds
	B O'Leary 1-3, SF O'Connor 0-4, M Hourigan 1-0, D O'Brien 0-1, B Daly 0-1, M Feehan 0-1, D O'Flynn 0-1.		R Hoare 0-5, C O'Sullivan 0-4, B Lynch 1-0, C Maughan 0-2, C O'Leary 0-1.

16 July 2005 Third round	Glenville	0-11 - 0-05	Macroom	Páirc Eoin Mhic Chárthaigh
	R Cahill 0-4, E O'Reilly 0-2, P Cahill 0-2, D Ryan 0-1, J Halbert 0-1, K Coakley 0-1.		D Deasy 0-2, G McPolin 0-2, F Goold 0-1.

23 July 2005 Third round	St. Vincent's	0-11 - 0-07	Nemo Rangers	Mayfield Grounds
	JP Murphy 0-4, J Buckley 0-2, A Buckley 0-2, D O'Connor 0-1, D Duggan 0-1, J Canniffe 0-1.		C Corkey 0-2, R Kenny 0-2, B Twomey 0-2, C O'Brien 0-1.

21 August 2005 Third round	Valley Rovers	1-05 - 1-12	Kiskeam	Carrigadrohid Grounds
	K Canty 1-1, H O'Donovan 0-2, J Hurley 0-1, F Lynch 0-1.		B Dennehy 1-2, N Cronin 0-3, M Herlihy 0-3, D Herlihy 0-2, S Linehan 0-1, J Herlihy 0-1.

3 September 2005 Third round	Castletownbere	1-07 - 1-08	Glanmire	Castletown-Kinneigh Grounds
	S O'Regan 0-6, D Wiseman 1-0, L Harrington 0-1.		James Murphy 1-4, P Ryan 0-2, D Molden 0-1, M Hopkins 0-1.

- Killavullen and Mayfield received byes on this round.

=== Quarter-finals ===
9 July 2005 Quarter-final	Killavullen	2-11 - 1-10	Mayfield	Carrignavar Grounds
	J O'Mahony 1-2, A O'Driscoll 1-0, J O'Neill 0-3, D Hartnett 0-2, P Hartnett 0-2, C O'Connell 0-1, B O'Driscoll 0-1.		D Crowley 1-1, P Condon 0-4, J O'Donovan 0-3, D Buckley 0-2.

27 August 2005 Quarter-final	Glenville	0-06 - 2-07	Kiskeam	Fr. Con Buckley Park
	J Halbert 0-3, D Ryan 0-1, P Cahill 0-1, N O'Riordan 0-1.		N Cronin 0-4, B Dennehy 1-0, C O'Leary 1-0, D Herlihy 0-1, T Dennehy 0-1, M Herlihy 0-1.

17 September 12005 Quarter-final	Glanmire	0-15 - 0-06	Newmarket	Killavullen Grounds
	James Murphy 0-7, D Molden 0-4, P Ryan 0-2, B O'Callaghan 0-1, John Murphy 0-1.		B Daly 0-3, SF O'Connor 0-2, D O'Brien 0-1.

24 September 2005 Quarter-final	Carbery Rangers	0-13 - 0-07	St. Vincent's	Charlie Hurley Park
	J Hayes 0-3, J Murphy 0-3, M Moore 0-2, D Hayes 0-2, M O'Sullivan 0-1, S Hayes 0-1, M Ronan 0-1.		D O'Connor 0-2, P O'Herlihy 0-2, F Murphy 0-2, J Buckley 0-1.

=== Semi-finals ===
8 October 2005 Semi-final	Glanmire	0-08 - 0-08	Killavullen	FitzGerald Park
	James Murphy 0-5, P Ryan 0-1, M Hopkins 0-1, D Molden 0-1,		J O'Mahony 0-4, G Kelleher 0-2, B O'Driscoll 0-2.

9 October 2005 Semi-final	Carbery Rangers	2-14 - 0-09	Kiskeam	Castle Grounds
	J Hayes 1-7, M Moore 1-1, J Murphy 0-3, D Hayes 0-1, M O'Sullivan 0-1, S Hayes 0-1.		N Cronin 0-4, D Herlihy 0-1, D Lenihan 0-1, E O'Mahony 0-1, B Dennehy 0-1.

15 October 2005 Semi-final replay	Glanmire	1-10 - 1-09	Killavullen	Páirc Uí Rinn
	James Murphy 1-8, P Ryan 0-1, D Molden 0-1.		J O'Mahony 0-4, J O'Neill 1-0, A O'Driscoll 0-2, I O'Driscoll 0-2, B O'Driscoll 0-1.

=== Final ===
23 October 2005 Final	Carbery Rangers	1-13 - 2-05	Glanmire	Páirc Uí Chaoimh
	J Hayes 0-4, M Moore 1-0, D Hayes 0-3, S Hayes 0-2, J Murphy 0-1, K McMahon 0-1, N Hayes 0-1, M Ronan 0-1.		M Hopkins 2-0, D Molden 0-2, R Ryan 0-1, P Meaney 0-1, J Murphy 0-1.	Referee: R Murphy (Lyre)

== Championship statistics ==
=== Top scorers ===
In a single game

Rank	Player	Club	Tally	Total	Opposition
1	James Murphy	Glanmire	1-08	11	Killavullen
2	John Hayes	Carbery Rangers	1-07	10	Kiskeam
3	Richie Cahill	Glenville	0-09	9	Carrigaline
4	Alan O'Regan	Castletownbere	2-02	8	Newmarket
5	James Murphy	Glanmire	2-01	7	Carrigaline
5	James Murphy	Glanmire	1-04	7	Castletownbere
5	James Murphy	Glanmire	0-07	7	Newmarket
8	Mark Hopkins	Glanmire	2-00	6	Carbery Rangers
8	Niall Cronin	Kiskeam	1-03	6	Aghabullogue
8	Barry O'Leary	Newmarket	1-03	6	Cill na Martra
8	Seán Francis O'Connor	Newmarket	0-06	6	Castletownbere
8	Nigel Lardner	Fermoy	0-06	6	Castletownbere
8	Seán O'Regan	Castletownbere	0-06	6	Glanmire
8	John Hayes	Carbery Rangers	0-06	6	Ballinora
