= Kevin Flahive =

Irish Gaelic footballer

Personal information
- Native name: Caoimhín Ó Flaithimh (Irish)
- Nickname: Kev
- Born: 30 March 1996 (age 30) Douglas, Cork, Ireland
- Occupation: Accounting Associate/Chonk Enthusiast (RIP)
- Height: 5 ft 5 in (165 cm)

Sport
- Sport: Gaelic Football
- Position: Left corner-back
Club
- Years: Club
- 2014-present: Douglas
Club titles
- Cork titles: 0
College
- Years: College
- 2015-2019: University College Cork
College titles
- Sigerson titles: 1
Inter-county*
Years	County	Apps (scores)
2018-present	Cork	10 (0-00)
Inter-county titles
- Munster titles: 0
- All-Irelands: 0
- NFL: 0
- All Stars: 0
- *Inter County team apps and scores correct as of 22:50, 18 November 2020.

Kevin Flahive (born 30 March 1996) is an Irish Gaelic footballer who plays for Cork Senior Championship club Douglas and at inter-county level with the Cork senior football team. He usually lines out as a left corner-back, wing back or does the man marking role.

== Playing career ==
=== University College Cork ===
During his studies at University College Cork, Flahive was selected for the college's senior football team. On 20 February 2019, he won a Sigerson Cup medal after lining out at full-back in the 0–16 to 1–09 win over St. Mary's University College in the final.

=== Douglas ===
Flahive joined the Douglas club at a young age and played in all grades at juvenile and underage levels. He first enjoyed success with the club's minor team, claiming a Premier 1 Minor Championship medal after a defeat of St. Finbarr's in 2013, before winning an under-21 title after a win over Cill na Martra in 2017. By this stage Flahive had joined the Douglas senior team, having made his debut in a 0–09 to 0–05 win over Newcestown during the 2014 Cork County Championship.

=== Cork ===
Flahive first played for Cork when he was drafted onto the Cork minor team for the 2013 Munster Minor Championship. Once again eligible for the grade the following year, he was appointed team captain and was at full-back when Cork suffered a 2–17 to 2–13 defeat by Kerry in the 2014 Munster final.

Flahive progressed onto the Cork under-21 team in advance of the 2016 Munster Under-21 Championship. He ended the campaign with a winners' medal after a 3–09 to 1–14 win over Kerry in the final. On 30 April 2016, Flahive was at left wing-back when Cork suffered a 5–07 to 1–13 defeat by Mayo in the All-Ireland final.

On 27 January 2018, Flahive made his first appearance for the Cork senior team when he lined out at right wing-back in a 3–16 to 1–16 defeat by Tipperary in the opening round of the 2018 National League. He made his championship debut on 26 May 2018 when he played at left corner-back in a 1–17 to 0–09 win over Tipperary in the Munster semi-final. Flahive was switched to centre-back for the subsequent 3–18 to 2–04 defeat by Kerry in the Munster final.

After a second successive Munster final defeat by Kerry in 2019, Flahive claimed his first senior silverware when Cork secured the delayed National League Division 3 title after remaining undefeated for the entire campaign in 2020.

== Career statistics ==
As of match played 8 November 2020.

Team	Year	National League			Munster		All-Ireland		Total	
Team	Year	Division	Apps	Score	Apps	Score	Apps	Score	Apps	Score
Cork	2018	Division 2	6	0-00	2	0-00	1	0-00	9	0-00
Cork	2019	Division 2	7	0-00	2	0-00	4	0-00	13	0-00
Cork	2020	Division 3	1	0-00	1	0-00	0	0-00	2	0-00
Total			14	0-00	5	0-00	5	0-00	24	0-00

== Honours ==
University College Cork

- Sigerson Cup (1): 2019

Douglas

- Cork Premier Under-21 A Football Championship (1): 2017
- Cork Premier 1 Minor Football Championship (1): 2013

Cork

- National Football League Division 3 (1): 2020
- Munster Under-21 Football Championship (1): 2016
