= 1939 Cork Junior Football Championship =

Irish Gaelic football competition

- Champions: Midleton (3rd title); B. Forrest (captain)
- Runners-up: Carbery Rangers; J. Cahill (captain)

The 1939 Cork Junior Football Championship was the 41st staging of the Cork Junior Football Championship since its establishment by the Cork County Board in 1895.

The final was played on 26 November 1939 at the Mardyke in Cork, between Midleton and Carbery Rangers, in what was their first ever meeting in the final. Midleton won the match by 2–06 to 1–02 to claim their third championship title overall and a first championship title in 22 years.

== Results ==
=== Final ===
| 26 November 1939 Final | Midleton | 2–06 – 1–02 | Carbery Rangers | The Mardyke |
