= 2009 Cork Senior Football Championship =

Gaelic football competition

- Dates: 18 April 2009 – 9 October 2009
- Teams: 26
- Sponsor: Evening Echo
- Champions: Clonakilty (9th title); Timmy Anglin (captain); Haulie O'Neill (manager)
- Runners-up: St. Finbarr's; Michael Ryan (captain); Tony Leahy (manager)
- Relegated: Mallow

Tournament statistics
- Matches played: 40
- Goals scored: 55 (1.38 per match)
- Points scored: 798 (19.95 per match)
- Top scorer(s): Donncha O'Connor (3-19)

The 2009 Cork Senior Football Championship was the 121st staging of the Cork Senior Football Championship since its establishment by the Cork County Board in 1887. The draw for the opening fixtures took place on 14 December 2008. The championship began on 18 April 2009 and ended on 9 October 2009.

Nemo Rangers entered the championship as the defending champions, however, they were defeated by Carbery at the quarter-final stage.

On 27 September 2009, Clonakilty won the championship following a 1-13 to 1-12 defeat of St. Finbarr's in the final. This was their 9th championship title overall and their first title since 1996.

Duhallow's Donncha O'Connor was the championship's top scorer with 3-19.

== Team changes ==
=== To Championship ===
Promoted from the Cork Premier Intermediate Football Championship

- St. Finbarr's

=== From Championship ===
Relegated to the Cork Premier Intermediate Football Championship

- Bantry Blues

== Results ==
=== Colleges/divisions section ===
19 April 2009 Round 1	University College Cork	0-06 - 2-25	Carbery	Charlie Hurley Park, Bandon
	J Buckley 0-2, D Sexton 0-2, D O'Shea 0-1, D Casey 0-1.		D O'Donovan 0-6, C Keane 1-2, C O'Driscoll 0-5, K Coffey 1-1, T Twomey 0-3, T Deasy 0-2, H Curran 0-2, R Hourihane 0-2, K Harrington 0-1, O Sexton 0-1.	Referee: G Sweeney (Glenville)

19 April 2009 Round 1	Carrigdhoun	1-09 - 0-07	Beara	Drimoleague
	F Lynch 0-5, G White 1-1, N Coakley 0-1, E Murphy 0-1, A Mac Gearailt 0-1.		T Collins 0-3, BG O'Sullivan 0-3, A O'Sullivan 0-1.	Referee: P Downey (Inniscarra)

19 April 2009 Round 1	Avondhu	1-08 - 1-10	Seandún	Páirc Uí Rinn, Cork
	T Monaghan 1-2, P Kissane 0-3, J O'Shea 0-2, R McEniry 0-1.		JP Murphy 0-9, S Howard 1-1.	Referee: D Forde (Donoughmore)

20 April 2009 Round 1	Cork Institute of Technology	0-12 - 2-07	Duhallow	Mallow GAA Complex, Mallow
	D Goulding 0-7, C O'Shea 0-1, P O'Flynn 0-1, G Sayers 0-1, S O'Hare 0-1, J O'Leary 0-1.		D O'Connor 2-4, B Dennehy 0-1, N Fleming 0-1, D Gayer 0-1.	Referee: N Barrett (Carrigtwohill)

20 April 2009 Round 1	Muskerry	1-08 - 0-14	Imokilly	Páirc Uí Rinn, Cork
	D Goold 1-2, C Sheehan 0-2, E Lougheed 0-2, M McDonagh 0-1, F Goold 0-1.		K Coakley 0-5, P O'Sullivan 0-3, J Murphy 0-3, K O'Brien 0-2, J O'Mahony 0-1.	Referee: D Farrell (Mitchelstown)

10 May 2009 Round 2	Duhallow	1-10 - 0-11	Carrigdhoun	Dr. Croke Park, Ballyclough
	D O'Flynn 0-6, S O'Sullivan 1-0, N Cronin 0-1, N Fleming 0-1, B Dennehy 0-1, L McLoughlin 0-1.		G White 0-4, F Lynch 0-3, B Coughlan 0-1, A Mac Gearailt 0-1, P Murphy 0-1, E Collins 0-1.	Referee: D Farrell (Mitchelstown)

=== Round 1 ===
18 April 2009 Round 1	Na Piarsaigh	0-09 - 0-12	Clonakilty	Charlie Hurley Park, Bandon
	J Gardiner 0-4, S O'Sullivan 0-2, D McDonnell 0-1, A Ó hAilpín 0-1, S O'Connor 0-1.		P Griffin 0-4, C O'Donovan 0-2, B Walsh 0-2, T Anglin 0-1, D Murphy 0-1, H Kenny 0-1, C Callanan 0-1.	Referee: C Lane (Banteer)

18 April 2009 Round 1	Aghada	1-08 - 0-08	O'Donovan Rossa	Páirc Liam Mhic Cárthaigh, Ballygarvan
	T O'Keeffe 1-3, C Fleming 0-2, G Melvin 0-2, P O'Neill 0-1.		C McCarthy 0-5, C Crowley 0-2, R McCarthy 0-1.	Referee: C Lyons (Nemo Rangers)

19 April 2009 Round 1	Mallow	1-07 - 2-12	Dohenys	Coachford
	C O'Riordan 1-3, M O'Brien 0-2, J Hayes 0-2.		G McCarthy 0-5, J McCarthy 1-0, D Collins 1-0, P McCarthy 0-3, M Milner 0-3, D Healy 0-1.	Referee: P O'Leary (Kilmurry)

20 April 2009 Round 1	Douglas	1-07 - 0-08	Naomh Abán	Coachford
	G McLoughlin 1-0, B Fitzgerald 0-2, F O'Sullivan 0-2, S McCarthy 0-1, R Murphy 0-1, A Barry 0-1.		M Ó Cróinín 0-4, D Ó Súilleabháin 0-1, S Ó Laoire 0-1, T Scanlon 0-1, M Ó Laoire 0-1.	Referee: G Harrington (Carrigaline)

20 April 2009 Round 1	St. Nicholas'	0-08 - 0-10	Bishopstown	Páirc Uí Chaoimh, Cork
	R Brosnan 0-4, D Brosnan 0-1, D Moylan 0-1, P O'Brien 0-1, K Barry 0-1.		S McCarthy 0-5, P O'Connor 0-3, C O'Neill 0-1, P Honohan 0-1.	Referee: C Lane (Banteer)

20 April 2009 Round 1	Ilen Rovers	1-09 - 1-09 (aet)	Castlehaven	Rossa Park, Skibbereen
	D Duggann 1-0, B O'Sullivan 0-3, K Daly 0-2, J Wycherley 0-2, L O'Driscoll 0-1, C O'Driscoll 0-1.		M Collins 0-5, B Collins 1-0, S Hurley 0-3, D Hurley 0-1.	Referee: J Dorgan (Nemo Rangers)

20 April 2009 Round 1	Nemo Rangers	0-13 - 0-11	Ballincollig	Páirc Uí Rinn, Cork
	J Masters 0-4, P Kerrigan 0-4, S O'Brien 0-1, A Cronin 0-1, P Hogan 0-1, W Morgan 0-1, M Cronin 0-1.		P O'Mahony 0-4, P Kelly 0-3, J Miskella 0-2, C O'Sullivan Jnr 0-1, N Allen 0-1.	Referee: M Collins (Clonakilty)

25 April 2009 Round 1	Ilen Rovers	1-09 - 0-14	Castlehaven	Rossa Park, Skibbereen
	A Holland 1-2, B O'Sullivan 0-5, C O'Driscoll 0-1, D O'Donovan 0-1.		M Collins 0-11, P Hurley 0-1, D Hurley 0-1, D Burns 0-1.	Referee: C Lane (Banteer)

5 May 2009 Round 1	Carbery Rangers	1-08 - 1-10	St. Finbarr's	Páirc Naomh Eoin, Newcestown
	J Hayes 1-5, J Fitzpatrick 0-2, S Hayes 0-1.		R Leahy 0-5, J Sexton 1-1, C O'Sullivan 0-2, R O'Mahony 0-1, J O'Donoghue 0-1.	Referee: P O'Leary (Kilmurry)

=== Round 2 ===
9 May 2009 Round 2	Naomh Abán	2-11 - 1-07	Mallow	Coachford
	D Ó Cróinín 1-2, S Ó Laoire 1-1, M Ó Cróinín 0-4, S Mac Cárthaigh 0-2, A Hankus 0-1, D Ó Súilleabháin 0-1.		C O'Riordan 1-5, D Kerrisk 0-2.	Referee: J Dorgan (Nemo Rangers)

16 May 2009 Round 2	St. Nicholas'	1-09 - 0-10	O'Donovan Rossa	Charlie Hurley Park, Bandon
	R Brosnan 0-4, D Brosnan 1-0, K Barry 0-2, S Ó Cearnaigh 0-2, P O'Brien 0-1.		C McCarthy 0-6, R McCarthy 0-2, C Keohane 0-1, D O'Sullivan 0-1.	Referee: P O'Leary (Kilmurry)

16 May 2009 Round 2	Na Piarsaigh	2-04 - 0-06	Ilen Rovers	Charlie Hurley Park, Bandon
	J Gardiner 1-3, G Noonan 1-0, S O'Connor 0-1.		B O'Sullivan 0-4, C O'Driscoll 0-2.	Referee: G Sweeney (Glenville)

17 May 2009 Round 2	Ballincollig	0-07 - 0-07	Carbery Rangers	Páirc Naomh Eoin, Newcestown
	N Allen 0-2, P O'Mahony 0-2, A Donovan 0-1, C O'Sullivan 0-1, K Kelleher 0-1.		J Hayes 0-5, S Hayes 0-1, J McCarthy 0-1.	Referee: J Dorgan (Nemo Rangers)

20 June 2009 Round 2 replay	Ballincollig	1-09 - 1-11	Carbery Rangers	Páirc Naomh Eoin, Newcestown
	P O'Mahony 1-3, J Kelly 0-2, C O'Sullivan 0-1, A Donovan 0-1, J O'Brien 0-1, P McCarthy 0-1.		S Hayes 1-2, J Hayes 0-4, J O'Rourke 0-2, J Fitzgibbon 0-1, K McMahon 0-1, B Shanahan 0-1.	Referee: N barrett (Carrigtwohill)

=== Relegation play-offs ===
21 June 2009 Semi-final	Ilen Rovers	0-10 - 2-06	O'Donovan Rossa	Castlehaven
	B O'Sullivan 0-3, K O'Sullivan 0-2, C O'Driscoll 0-1, D Coughlan 0-1, D O'Donovan 0-1, D Duggan 0-1, A Holland 0-1.		C McCarthy 1-2, R McCarthy 1-0, T Hegarty 0-2, C Keohane 0-1, D Óg Hodnett 0-1.	Referee: J Dorgan (Nemo Rangers)

4 October 2009 Semi-final	Ballincollig	0-15 - 1-06	Mallow	Páirc Eoin Mhic Cárthaigh, D'more
	P O'Mahony 0-7, J Miskella 0-4, F Keohane 0-2, S O'Donoghue 0-1, N Galvin 0-1.		C O'Riordan 1-3, J Hayes 0-3.	Referee: G Harrington (Carrigaline)

9 October 2009 Final	Ilen Rovers	0-16 - 0-08	Mallow	Cloughduv
	K O'Sullivan 0-5, C O'Driscoll 0-4, J Wycherley 0-3, E Sheehy 0-3, F Collins 0-1.		C O'Riordan 0-3, J Hayes 0-2, C Stanton 0-1, P O'Riordan 0-1, BJ Ryan 0-1.	Referee: P O'Leary (Kilmurry)

=== Round 3 ===
19 June 2009 Round 3	Clonakilty	2-08 - 0-14	Aghada	Páirc Uí Rinn, Cork
	C Callanan 2-0, C O'Donovan 0-6, B Walsh 0-1, C McManus 0-1.		T O'Keeffe 0-3, S O'Keeffe 0-3, C Fleming 0-2, G Melvin 0-1, D Creedon 0-1, R Dwane 0-1, P O'Neill 0-1, T O'Neill 0-1, E Healy 0-1.	Referee: J Dorgan (Nemo Rangers)

21 June 2009 Round 3	Carbery	1-16 - 2-08	St. Nicholas'	Cloughduv
	G Canty 1-2, C Keane 0-3, D O'Donovan 0-3, T Twomey 0-3, H Curran 0-3, C O'Driscoll 0-1, S Keohane 0-1.		R Brosnan 0-4, D Goggin 1-0, David Brosnan 1-0, Dean Brosnan 0-1, G Moylan 0-1, K Barry 0-1, D Cunningham 0-1.	Referee: P O'Leary (Kilmurry)

21 June 2009 Round 3	Na Piarsaigh	1-07 - 0-11	St. Finbarr's	Páirc Uí Rinn, Cork
	J Gardiner 0-5, A Ó hAilpín 1-0, D McDonnell 0-1, S Glasgow 0-1.		C McCarthy 0-4, F Murray 0-2, R O'Mahony 0-2, R Leahy 0-1, G Leahy 0-1, J Coyle 0-1.	Referee: C Lane (Banteer)

21 June 2009 Round 3	Duhallow	0-08 - 0-08	Naomh Abán	Kilmurry
	D O'Connor 0-7, D O'Flynn 0-1.		M Ó Cróinín 0-5, S Mac Cárthaigh 0-1, D Ó Cróinín 0-1, S Ó Laoire 0-1.	Referee: G Sweeney (Glenville)

21 June 2009 Round 3	Bishopstown	2-11 - 1-10	Imokilly	Páirc Uí Rinn, Cork
	B Healy 1-1, P O'Connor 1-1, S McCarthy 0-4, J O'Shea 0-2, P Honohan 0-2, G Walsh 0-1.		P O'Sullivan 1-2, D O'Sullivan 0-2, M Cussen 0-2, P Cahill 0-1, B Kirby 0-1, K Coakley 0-1, J Murphy 0-1.	Referee: S Collins (Carrigaline)

28 June 2009 Round 3	Douglas	0-07 - 0-08	Dohenys	Cloughduv
	F O'Sullivan 0-4, N Heffernan 0-1, S McCarthy 0-1, J Farrell 0-1.		J McCarthy 0-2, P McCarthy 0-2, D Healy 0-2, M Farr 0-1, G McCarthy 0-1.	Referee: N Barrett (Carrigtwohill)

11 July 2009 Round 3	Castlehaven	0-14 - 0-11	Carbery Rangers	Sam Maguire Park, Dunmanway
	M Collins 0-4, B Deasy 0-3, S Hurley 0-3, M Cahalane 0-1, S Connolly 0-1, B Cahalane 0-1, S Cahalane 0-1.		J Hayes 0-6, S Hayes 0-3, D Hayes 0-1, M O'Sullivan 0-1.	Referee: C Lane (Banteer)

12 July 2009 Round 3 replay	Duhallow	1-12 - 1-08	Naomh Abán	Kilmurry
	D O'Connor 1-4, B Dennehy 0-4, D Gayer 0-1, A Walsh 0-1, D O'Flynn 0-1, N O'Sullivan 0-1.		M Ó Cróinín 1-1, S Mac Cárthaigh 0-4, S Ó Laoire 0-1, E Scannell 0-1, D Ó Ceocháin.	Referee: J Dorgan (Nemo Rangers)

12 July 2009 Round 3 replay	Clonakilty	1-14 - 1-04	Aghada	Páirc Uí Rinn, Cork
	C O'Donovan 0-8, D Lyons 1-0, C Callanan 0-3, B Walsh 0-2, D Murphy 0-1.		P O'Neill 1-0, S O'Keeffe 0-2, T O'Keeffe 0-1, G Hurley 0-1.	Referee: P O'Leary (Kilmurry)

18 July 2009 Round 3	Nemo Rangers	1-13 - 0-11	Seandún	Páirc Uí Rinn, Cork
	A Morgan 1-1, A Cronin 0-4, P Kerrigan 0-4, J Masters 0-2, M Cronin 0-1, D Kearney 0-1.		E Buckley 0-4, JP Murphy 0-3, S Howard 0-1, T Lotty 0-1, M Mulconroy 0-1, J Buckley 0-1.	Referee: P O'Leary (Kilmurry)

=== Quarter-finals ===
10 July 2009 Quarter-final	Bishopstown	1-09 - 0-09	Dohenys	Cloughduv
	P O'Connor 1-0, G Walsh 0-3, S McCarthy 0-2, P Honohan 0-2, A O'Connor 0-1, J O'Shea 0-1.		G McCarthy 0-5, P McCarthy 0-2, J McCarthy 0-2.	Referee: P O'Leary (Kilmurry)

19 July 2009 Quarter-final	St. Finbarr's	0-14 - 0-13	Castlehaven	Charlie Hurley Park, Bandon
	F Murray 0-4, R O'Mahony 0-4, R Leahy 0-3, J o'Donoghue 0-2, E Keane 0-1.		M Collins 0-3, B Deasy 0-3, B Hurley 0-2, S Hurley 0-2, M Cahalane 0-1, B Collins 0-1, P Hurley 0-1.	Referee: G Sweeney (Glenville)

19 July 2009 Quarter-final	Duhallow	1-12 - 2-14	Clonakilty	Kilmurry
	D O'Connor 0-4, N Fleming 1-0, N O'Sullivan 0-3, B Dennehy 0-2, D Gayer 0-1, S O'Sullivan 0-1, J Helay 0-1.		C Callanan 1-3, C McManus 0-4, C O'Donovan 0-4, N Hayes 1-0, M O'Brien 0-2, B Walsh 0-1.	Referee: C Lyons (Nemo Rangers)

6 August 2009 Quarter-final	Nemo Rangers	1-09 - 2-11	Carbery	Charlie Hurley Park, Bandon
	J Masters 0-6, A Cronin 1-1, D Mehigan 0-1, C O'Shea 0-1.		T Twomey 1-2, H Curran 1-1, D O'Donovan 0-4, C O'Driscoll 0-3, G Canty 0-1.	Referee: P O'Leary (Kilmurry)

=== Semi-finals ===
30 August 2009 Semi-final	Clonakilty	0-11 - 1-07	Bishopstown	Páirc Uí Rinn, Cork
	C Callanan 0-3, Timmy Anglin 0-2, C O'Donovan 0-2, C McManus 0-1, D Murphy 0-1, P Griffin 0-1, S Nagle 0-1.		P O'Connor 1-2, D Hickey 0-2, J O'Shea 0-1, B Healy 0-1, A O'Connor 0-1.	Referee: G Sweeney (Glenville)

30 August 2009 Semi-final	Carbery	0-09 - 1-11	St. Finbarr's	Páirc Uí Rinn, Cork
	C O'Driscoll 0-5, D O'Donovan 0-3, T Deasy 0-1.		F Murray 0-5, C McCarthy 1-0, R o'Mahony 0-2, J Sexton 0-2, R Leahy 0-1, G Leahy 0-1.	Referee: C Lane (Banteer)

=== Final ===
27 September 2009 Final	Clonakilty	1-13 - 1-12	St. Finbarr's	Páirc Uí Chaoimh, Cork
	C McManus, C Callanan 0-3 each, T Anglin 1-0, D Murphy, N Griffin, M O'Brien, C O'Donovan (0-1f), P Griffin, D O'Regan (0-1f), H Kenny 0-1 each.	Report	F Murray 0-5 (0-3f), J Sexton 1-0, J O'Donoghue, R Leahy (0-1f) 0-2 each, G Leahy, C O'Sullivan, R O'Mahony 0-1 each.	Referee: C Lane (Banteer)

== Championship statistics ==
=== Top scorers ===
Top scorers overall

Rank	Player	Club	Tally	Total	Matches	Average
1	Donncha O'Connor	Duhallow	3-19	28	5	5.60
2	Cian O'Riordan	Mallow	3-14	23	4	5.75
2	John Hayes	Carbery Rangers	1-20	23	4	5.75
2	Mark Collins	Castlehaven	0-23	23	4	5.75
2	Colin O'Donovan	Clonakilty	0-23	23	6	3.83
3	Colum Callanan	Clonakilty	3-13	22	6	3.66
4	Podsie O'Mahony	Ballincollig	1-16	19	4	4.75
5	Mícheál Ó Cróinín	Naomh Abán	1-14	17	4	4.25
6	Conor McCarthy	O'Donovan Rossa	1-13	16	3	5.20
6	Daniel O'Donovan	Carbery	0-16	16	4	4.00
6	Fionán Murray	St. Finbarr's	0-16	16	5	3.20

Top scorers in a single game

Rank	Player	Club	Tally	Total	Opposition
1	Mark Collins	Castlehaven	0-11	11	Ilen Rovers
2	Donncha O'Connor	Duhallow	2-04	10	CIT
3	J. P. Murphy	Seandún	0-09	9	Avondhu
4	John Hayes	Carbery Rangers	1-05	8	St. Finbarr's
4	Cian O'Riordan	Mallow	1-05	8	Naomh Abán
4	Colin O'Donovan	Clonakilty	0-08	8	Aghada
5	Daniel Goulding	CIT	0-07	7	Duhallow
5	Podsie O'Mahony	Ballincollig	0-07	7	Mallow
5	Donncha O'Connor	Duhallow	0-07	7	Naomh Abán

=== Miscellaneous ===
- Clonakilty win the title for the first time since 1996.
- St. Finbarr's qualify for the final for the first time since 1993
