= 2003 Cork Junior A Football Championship =

105th staging of the Cork Junior A Football Championship

- Dates: 12 October – 30 November 2003
- Teams: 8
- Sponsor: Permanent TSB
- Champions: Carbery Rangers (1st title); Johnny Murphy (captain); Michael Paul Hicks (manager)
- Runners-up: Cill na Martra; Noel O'Leary (captain); Derry Crowley (manager)

Tournament statistics
- Matches played: 7
- Goals scored: 6 (0.86 per match)
- Points scored: 131 (18.71 per match)
- Top scorer(s): Richard Hoare (1–16)

The 2003 Cork Junior A Football Championship was the 105th staging of the Cork Junior A Football Championship since its establishment by the Cork County Board. The draw for the opening fixtures took place on 8 December 2002. The championship ran from 12 October to 30 November 2003.

The final was played on 30 November 2003 at Páirc Uí Chaoimh in Cork, between Carbery Rangers and Cill na Martra, in what was their first ever meeting in the final. Carbery Rangers won the match by 0–10 to 0–05 to claim their first ever championship title.

Cill na Martra's Richard Hoare was the championship's top scorer with 1–16.

== Qualification ==
Division	Championship	Champions
Avondhu	North Cork Junior A Football Championship	Fermoy
Carbery	South West Junior A Football Championship	Carbery Rangers
Carrigdhoun	South East Junior A Football Championship	Ballygarvan
Duhallow	Duhallow Junior A Football Championship	Millstreet
Imokilly	East Cork Junior A Football Championship	Erin's Own
Muskerry	Mid Cork Junior A Football Championship	Cill Na Martra
Seandún	City Junior A Football Championship	Mayfield

== Results ==
=== Quarter-finals ===
12 October 2003 Quarter-final	Mayfield	0–13 – 0–08	Millstreet	Dr. Croke Park
	B Hegarty 0–5, E Crowley 0–3, S Kiely 0–1, T Lotty 0–1, D Lucey 0–1, C Brosnan 0–1, R Scannell 0–1.		D Kiely 0–4, T O'Connor 0–1, T Collins 0–1, BA Kelleher 0–1, F O'Leary 0–1.	Referee: N Brosnan (Killavullen)

26 October 2003 Quarter-final	Carbery Rangers	1–16 – 1–09	Ballygarvan	Páirc Naomh Eoin
	J Hayes 0–5, D Hayes 1–0, M Moore 0–3, N Hayes 0–2, S Hayes 0–2, J Murphy 0–2, M O'Sullivan 0–1, G Wycherley 0–1.		K Ashman 1–2, J Spillane 0–2, D Sweeney 0–2, S O'Leary 0–1, C Ó Conchubhair 0–1, A Murphy 0–1.	Referee: P Higgins (Ballincollig)

2 November 2003 Quarter-final	Cill na Martra	1–08 – 0–08	Garnish	St. Colum's Park
	R Hoare 1–7, C McSweeney 0–1.		D Lowney 0–3, T Bowe 0–1, B Walsh 0–1, P Murphy 0–1, C O'Neill 0–1, F O'Sullivan 0–1.	Referee: M Collins (Clonakilty)

9 November 2003 Quarter-final	Fermoy	1–07 – 0–08	Erin's Own	Ballyhooly Grounds
	P Lonergan 1–2, S Killeen 0–3, J Dennigan 0–1, T Higgins 0–1.		P Fitzgerald 0–2, S Murphy 0–2, J Corcoran 0–1, K Murphy 0–1, T O'Keeffe 0–1, P McNamara 0–1.	Referee: R Murphy (Lyre)

=== Semi-finals ===
9 November 2003 Semi-final	Cill na Martra	1–10 – 1–09	Mayfield	Coachford Sportsfield
	R Hoare 0–7, C O'Sullivan 1–1, D Buckley 0–1, S Lynch 0–1.		B Hegarty 0–4, K Brosnan 1–0, A Elliott 0–3, M O'Callaghan 0–1, R Scannell 0–1.

23 November 2003 Semi-final	Carbery Rangers	0–12 – 0–08	Fermoy	Kilmurry Grounds
	J Hayes 0–4, J Murphy 0–3, K McMahon 0–2, S Hayes 0–2, D Hayes 0–1.		P Lonergan 0–4, N Lardner 0–2, M Kenny 0–1, S McCarthy 0–1.	Referee: P Higgins (Ballincollig)

=== Final ===
30 November 2003 Final	Carbery Rangers	0–10 – 0–05	Cill na Martra	Páirc Uí Chaoimh
	J Hayes 0–5; D Hayes 0–2; M O’Sullivan, K McMahon and J Murphy 0–1 each.	Report	R Hoare 0–2 (frees); K O’Sullivan, B Lynch and M O’Connor 0–1 each.	Attendance: 5,293

== Championship statistics ==
=== Top scorers ===
Rank	Player	Club	Tally	Total	Matches	Average
1	Richard Hoare	Cill an Martra	1–16	19	3	6.33
2	John Hayes	Carbery Rangers	0–14	14	3	4.66
3	Philip Lonergan	Fermoy	1–06	9	2	4.50
3	Barry Hegarty	Mayfield	0–09	9	2	4.50
5	Declan Hayes	Carbery Rangers	1–03	6	3	2.00
5	Johnny Murphy	Carbery Rangers	0–06	6	3	2.00
