= 2003–04 All-Ireland Junior Club Football Championship =

- Dates: 8 November 2003 – 30 May 2004
- Sponsor: Allied Irish Bank
- Champions: Wolfe Tones (1st title)
- Runners-up: Carbery Rangers; Johnny Murphy (captain)

The 2003–04 All-Ireland Junior Club Football Championship was the third staging of the All-Ireland Junior Club Football Championship since its establishment by the Gaelic Athletic Association. The championship ran from 8 November 2003 to 30 May 2004.

The All-Ireland final was played on 30 May 2004 at Shamrock Park in Cremartin, between Wolfe Tones and Carbery Rangers. Wolfe Tones won the match by 0–14 to 0–10 to claim their first ever championship title.

== Connacht Junior Club Football Championship ==
=== Connacht final ===
| 17 January 2004 Final | Salthill-Knocknacarra | 0-09 - 1-07 | Breaffy | The Prairie Grounds |

== Leinster Junior Club Football Championship ==
=== Leinster semi-finals ===
| 30 November 2003 Semi-final | Kilmore | 3-06 - 3-04 | Confey | Kilmore Grounds |
| | S Doran 2-2, P Sinnott 1-1, J Mernagh 0-2, G Whelan 0-1. | | H Lynch 1-3, R McMahon 1-0, C Hughes 1-0, K Divilly 0-1. |

| 7 December 2003 Semi-final | Wolfe Tones | 2-09 - 0-06 | Rhode | Wolfe Tones Grounds |
| | A McKeever 1-0, K McKeever 1-0, C Ward 0-3, J Tiernan 0-1, D McGrath 0-1, A Fox 0-1, R O'Kelly-Lynch 0-1, S Corrigan 0-1, B McGinn 0-1. | | P Glennon 0-4, G Kerrigan 0-1, E Hickey 0-1. |

=== Leinster final ===
| 14 December 2003 Final | Kilmore | 0-06 - 1-10 | Wolfe Tones | Kilmore Grounds |
| | P Sinnott 0-4, J Berry 0-1, D Rossiter 0-1. | | C Ward 1-2, A Fox 0-5, J Tiernan 0-1, B McGinn 0-1, P Caffrey 0-1. |

== Munster Junior Club Football Championship ==
=== Munster quarter-finals ===
| 8 February 2004 Quarter-final | Ballyvaughan-Fanore | 2-13 - 0-05 | Ballyduff Lower | Ballyvaughan Grounds |
| | J McDonagh 0-7, J Martyn 1-2, K Corcoran 1-0, D McNamara 0-2, J Hynes 0-1, S Hynes 0-1. | | R Barron 0-2, J O'Leary 0-2, J Kennedy 0-1. |

| 8 February 2004 Quarter-final | Ballina | 1-06 - 0-14 | Carbery Rangers | Ballina Grounds |
| | J O'Brien 1-1, D McKeogh 0-2, A Devine 0-1, T Collins 0-1, P King 0-1. | | J Hayes 0-9, M Moore 0-2, N Hayes 0-1, K McMahon 0-1, Johnny Murphy 0-1. |

=== Munster semi-finals ===
| 22 February 2004 Semi-final | Carbery Rangers | 1-15 - 0-03 | Bruree | Ardagh Grounds |
| | J Hayes 1-4, S Hayes 0-4, Johnny Murphy 0-3, K McMahon 0-2, M O'Sullivan 0-1, M Moore 0-1. |

| 22 February 2004 Semi-final | Annascaul | 1-13 - 0-06 | Ballyvaughan-Fanore | Paddy Kennedy Memorial Park |
| | B O'Driscoll 1-2, N Sheehy 0-4, G Farrell 0-3, M Moynihan 0-2, T Farrell 0-1, K O'Driscoll 0-1. | | J Martyn 0-6. |

=== Munster final ===
| 7 March 2004 Final | Annascaul | 0-11 - 0-13 | Carbery Rangers | FitzGerald Stadium |
| | G Farrell 0-8, B O'Driscoll 0-2, J O'Driscoll 0-1. | | J Hayes 0-5, M Moore 0-3, M O'Sullivan 0-1, N Hayes 0-1, M Ronan 0-1, D Hayes 0-1, Johnny Murphy 0-1. |

== Ulster Junior Club Football Championship ==
=== Ulster semi-finals ===
| 15 February 2004 Semi-final | Monaghan Harps | 1-11 - 0-08 | Eskra Emmetts | Shamrock Park |
| | S Smyth 1-0, S McAleer 0-3, N Treanor 0-3, G Treanor 0-2, M Morgan 0-1, P Smyth 0-1, G McAleer 0-1. | | J McCarroll 0-9, P Marlow 0-1. |

| 22 February 2004 Semi-final | Limavady | 1-08 - 1-07 | Naomh Bríd | Shamrock Park |
| | R Clarence 1-0, M Cutmore 0-2, P Brown 0-2, C O'Callaghan 0-2, M Higgins 0-1, S Keown 0-1. | | D Walsh 1-0, S Walls 0-2, P Rooney 0-1, D Langan 0-1, M Gallagher 0-1, P McDaid 0-1. |

=== Ulster final ===
| 7 March 2004 Final | Monaghan Harps | 1-11 - 2-08 | Limavady | Shamrock Park |
| | P Smyth 1-1, S McAleer 0-4, N Treanor 0-2, D Swift 0-1, G Murray 0-1, C McCaughey 0-1, M McCoy 0-1. | | M Cutmore 1-5, C Forrest 1-0, P Brown 0-3. |

| 21 March 2004 Final replay | Monaghan Harps | 1-12 - 1-02 | Limavady | Shamrock Park |
| | N Treanor 0-5, G Murray 1-0, P Smyth 0-3, P Coyle 0-2, M McCoy 0-1, S McAleer 0-1. | | M Cutmore 1-1, M O'Brien 0-1. |

== All-Ireland Junior Club Football Championship ==
=== All-Ireland semi-finals ===
| 4 April 2004 Semi-final | Wolfe Tones | 3-09 - 1-06 | Monaghan Harps | Shamrock Park |
| | C Ward 1-3, D McGrath 1-1, R O'Kelly-Lynch 1-0, A Fox 0-3, K McKeever 0-2. | | N Treanor 0-4, G Treanor 1-0, M McCoy 0-1, P Smyth 0-1. |

| 4 April 2004 Semi-final | Carbery Rangers | 3-14 - 0-07 | Breaffy | Claughaun Grounds |
| | J Hayes 0-8, M Moloney 2-1, M Ronan 1-0, Johnny Murphy 0-2, K McMahon 0-1, S Hayes 0-1, G Wycherley 0-1. | | A Durcan 0-3, G Jennings 0-2, T McManamon 0-1, L Cresham 0-1. |

=== All-Ireland final ===
| 30 May 2004 Final | Wolfe Tones | 0-14 - 0-10 | Carbery Rangers | Shamrock Park |
| | C Ward 0-7, A Fox 0-3, A McKeever 0-2, J Kiernan 0-1, E Reilly 0-1. | | J Hayes 0-4, M Moore 0-2, M Ronan 0-2, K McMahon 0-1, N Hayes 0-1, D Hayes 0-1. | Referee: B McNally (Cremartin Shamrocks) |
