= John O'Rourke (Gaelic footballer) =

Irish Gaelic footballer

Personal information
- Native name: Seán Ó Ruairc (Irish)
- Born: 31 March 1992 (age 34) Rosscarbery, County Cork, Ireland
- Occupation: Student
- Height: 5 ft 10 in (178 cm)

Sport
- Sport: Gaelic football
- Position: Left wing-forward
Club*
Years	Club	Apps (scores)
2009-present	Carbery Rangers	55 (5-107)
Club titles
- Cork titles: 1
Inter-county**
Years	County	Apps (scores)
2013-present	Cork	7 (1-6)
Inter-county titles
- Munster titles: 0
- All-Irelands: 0
- NHL: 0
- All Stars: 0
- * club appearances and scores correct as of 23:11, 5 March 2023. **Inter County team apps and scores correct as of 14:03, 16 July 2014.

John O'Rourke (born 31 March 1992) is an Irish Gaelic footballer who plays as a left wing-forward for the Cork senior team.

Born in Rosscarbery, County Cork, O'Rourke first played competitive Gaelic football during his schooling at Mount St. Michael. He arrived on the inter-county scene at the age of seventeen when he first linked up with the Cork minor team, before later joining the under-21 side. He made his senior debut during the 2013 championship. Since then O'Rourke has become a regular member of the starting fifteen.

O'Rourke has also lined out with the Munster inter-provincial team. At club level he plays with Carbery Rangers.

== Career statistics ==
=== Club ===
Team	Season	Cork		Munster		All-Ireland		Total	
Team	Season	Apps	Score	Apps	Score	Apps	Score	Apps	Score
Carbery Rangers	2009-10	3	0-02	—		—		3	0-02
Carbery Rangers	2010-11	6	0-08	—		—		6	0-08
Carbery Rangers	2011-12	5	0-05	—		—		5	0-05
Carbery Rangers	2012-13	4	0-04	—		—		4	0-04
Carbery Rangers	2013-14	3	0-07	—		—		3	0-07
Carbery Rangers	2014-15	6	0-12	—		—		6	0-12
Carbery Rangers	2015-16	3	2-08	—		—		3	2-08
Carbery Rangers	2016-17	5	1-13	1	0-02	—		6	1-15
Carbery Rangers	2017-18	4	1-10	—		—		4	1-10
Carbery Rangers	2018-19	4	0-10	—		—		4	0-10
Carbery Rangers	2019-20	3	0-10	—		—		3	0-10
Carbery Rangers	2020-21	2	0-06	—		—		2	0-06
Carbery Rangers	2021-22	3	0-06	—		—		3	0-06
Carbery Rangers	2022-23	3	1-04	—		—		3	0-10
Career total		54	5-105	1	0-02	—		55	5-107

== Honours ==
=== Team ===
Cork

- Munster Under-21 Football Championship (3): 2011, 2012, 2013
- Munster Minor Football Championship (1): 2010
