= 2014 Cork Senior Football Championship =

Gaelic football competition

- Dates: 2 April 2014 – 19 October 2014
- Teams: 25
- Champions: Ballincollig (1st title); David Lordan (captain); Michael O'Brien (manager)
- Runners-up: Carbery Rangers; John Hayes (captain); Micheál O'Sullivan (manager)
- Relegated: St. Vincent's

Tournament statistics
- Matches played: 39
- Goals scored: 86 (2.21 per match)
- Points scored: 848 (21.74 per match)
- Top scorer(s): John Hayes (5-28)

The 2014 Cork Senior Football Championship was the 116th staging of the Cork Senior Football Championship since its establishment by the Cork County Board in 1887. The draw for the opening round fixtures took place in December 2013. The championship began on 2 April 2014 and ended on 19 October 2014.

Castlehaven were the defending champions, however, they were defeated by Carbery Rangers in a Round 4 replay.

On 19 October 2014, Ballincollig won the championship following a 1-13 to 1-10 defeat of Carbery Rangers in the final. It remains their only championship title.

John Hayes from the Carbery Rangers club was the championship's top scorer with 5-28.

== Team changes ==
=== To Championship ===
Promoted from the Cork Premier Intermediate Football Championship

- Clyda Rovers

=== From Championship ===
Relegated to the Cork Premier Intermediate Football Championship

- Newmarket

== Results ==
=== Divisions/colleges section ===
2 April 2014 Round 1	University College Cork	1-12 - 1-09	Cork Institute of Technology	Páirc Uí Rinn, Cork
	T Hickey 0-5, S Keane 1-0, K Murphy 0-3, S O'Connor 0-1, S Power 0-1, E Ó Conchúir 0-1, B Coughlan 0-1.		D Daly 1-4, C Keating 0-2, K Corkery 0-2, K McIntyre 0-1.	Referee: K Murphy (Nemo Rangers)

14 April 2014 Round 2	Duhallow	w/o - scr.	Imokilly

14 April 2014 Round 2	Carbery	1-16 - 1-09	Avondhu	Cloughduv
	M Surgue 0-11, C O'Driscoll 1-1, G Canty 0-1, P Daly 0-1, A O'Connor 0-1, R O'Sullivan 0-1.		P O'Flynn 1-0, K Sheehan 0-3, D Pyne 0-2, J Daly 0-1, S Beston 0-1, A O'Brien 0-1, S Cahill 0-1.	Referee: D Murnane (Macroom)

15 April 2014 Round 2	Muskerry	2-13 - 1-11	University College Cork	Brinny Sportsfield, Brinny
	D Twomey 1-2, F Goold 0-5, M Ó Laoire 1-0, S Shorten 0-2, D O'Connell 0-2, J Carey 0-1, D Ambrose 0-1.		C Cox 0-6, P Geaney 0-5, B Coughlan 1-0.	Referee: J Dorgan (Nemo Rangers)

20 April 2014 Round 2	Beara	0-15 - 1-17	Seandún	Sam Maguire Park, Dunmanway
	D Harrington 0-6, A O'Sullivan 0-3, D Fenton 0-2, ST O'Sullivan 0-2, L Harrington 0-1, F Dwyer 0-1.		P Condon 1-4, E Buckley 0-5, P Cronin 0-4, C Buckley 0-3, J Kind 0-1.	Referee: D Murnane (Macroom)

2 June 2014 Round 3	Carbery	4-14 - 0-10	Seandún	Kilmichael
	C O'Driscoll 3-1, R Deane 1-2, M Sugrue 0-4, D Barron 0-3, P Daly 0-1, A O'Connor 0-1, S O'Neill 0-1, R O'Sullivan 0-1.		P Condon 0-6, E Buckley 0-3, C Buckley 0-1.	Referee: P O'Leary (Kilmurry)

16 July 2014 Round 3	Muskerry	0-15 - 0-14	Duhallow	Dromtariffe
	D Goulding 0-7, C Vaughan 0-4, F Goold 0-3, S Kelleher 0-1.		D O'Connor 0-6, S Hickey 0-3, A Walsh 0-3, M Vaughan 0-2.	Referee: K Murphy (Nemo Rangers)

=== Round 1 ===
3 May 2014 Round 1	St. Finbarr's	1-08 - 1-09	Ballincollig	Páirc Uí Rinn, Cork
	E McGreevy 0-5, P Wiley 1-0, C Lyons 0-1, K Hodgins 0-1, I Power 0-1.		I Coughlan 1-0, C Dorgan 0-3, P Kelly 0-2, C Kiely 0-1, C O'Sullivan 0-1, N Allen 0-1, J Miskella 0-1.	Referee: J Bermingham (Bride Rovers)

4 May 2014 Round 1	Bishopstown	2-15 - 0-08	Ilen Rovers	Macroom
	P Honohan 1-2, S Oaks 1-2, D O'Donovan 0-5, D Lester 0-2, E Byrne 0-1, K O'Halloran 0-1, B Coffey 0-1, F Desmond 0-1.		D Mac Eoin 0-3, K O'Sullivan 0-2, T Bushe 0-1, C Harrington 0-1, A Holland 0-1.	Referee: S Ryan (Macroom)

4 May 2014 Round 1	Douglas	0-09 - 0-05	Newcestown	Páirc Liam Mhic Cárthaigh, B'garvan
	A Cadogan 0-5, S Collins 0-2, S McCarthy 0-1, D Hanrahan 0-1.		J Desmond 0-2, F Keane 0-1, G O'Driscoll 0-1, R Bradfield 0-1.	Referee: J Bermingham (Bride Rovers)

4 May 2014 Round 1	Castlehaven	6-15 - 1-10	St. Vincent's	Macroom
	B Hurley 2-6, S Nolan 2-1, M Collins 1-4, M Hurley 1-0, P Hurley 0-1, C Hayes 0-1, S Hurley 0-1, S Cahalane 0-1.		D O'Connor 1-3, A Harte 0-2, G Kelleher 0-2, D O'Regan 0-1, J Buckley 0-1, JP Murphy 0-1.	Referee: P O'Leary (Kilmurry)

10 May 2014 Round 1	Nemo Rangers	2-17 - 0-01	Dohenys	Charlie Hurley Park, Bandon
	L Connolly 1-6, J Masters 1-5, P Kerrigan 0-2, C O'Brien 0-1, P Morgan 0-1, J Horgan 0-1, C Dalton 0-1.		Patrick McCarthy 0-1.	Referee: N Wall (Carrigaline)

10 May 2014 Round 1	St. Nicholas'	0-08 - 2-10	Clonakilty	Brinny Sportsfield, Brinny
	R McCarthy-Coade 0-4, R Brosnan 0-1, G Callinan 0-1, E Kearney 0-1, T Spain 0-1.		J Leahy 1-4, B O'Mahony 1-1, D O'Regan 0-2, J O'Mahony 0-2, P O'Sullivan 0-1.	Referee: B Coniry (Crosshaven)

11 May 2014 Round 1	O'Donovan Rossa	2-07 - 2-13	Clyda Rovers	Páirc Uí Rinn, Cork
	I Dineen 1-2, C McCarthy 1-1, T Hegarty 0-2, D Shannon 0-1, D Óg Hodnett 0-1.		P Kissane 1-3, C O'Sullivan 1-1, J Murphy 0-3, C Flanagan 0-3, S O'Connell 0-2, S Ronayne 0-1.	Referee: D Murnane (Macroom)

11 May 2014 Round 1	Carbery Rangers	5-17 - 0-03	Aghada	Páirc Uí Rinn, Cork
	J Hayes 2-4, S Hayes 1-3, C O'Donovan 1-1, D Hayes 1-1, B Shanahan 0-3, K McMahon 0-2, A Jennings 0-2, J O'Rourke 0-1.		C Fleming 0-1, C O'Driscoll 0-1, P O'Neill 0-1.	Referee: K Murphy (Nemo Rangers)

=== Round 2 ===
7 June 2014 Round 2	Aghada	1-12 - 0-20 (aet)	O'Donovan Rossa	Brinny Sportsfield, Brinny
	C Fleming 0-6, R Kennedy 1-1, T O'Keeffe 0-2, S Wall 0-1, P O'Neill 0-1, T Hartnett 0-1.		D Shannon 0-9, K Davis 0-4, D Óg Hodnett 0-2, T Hegarty 0-2, R Long 0-1, C Crowley 0-1, D Hazel 0-1.	Referee: J Dorgan (Nemo Rangers)

7 June 2014 Round 2	St. Nicholas'	1-09 - 1-08	Dohenys	Kilmurry
	N Hurley 1-0 (og), R McCarthy-Coade 0-3, D Brosnan 0-3, B O'Donovan 0-2, A O'Brien 0-1.		D Healy 1-0, M Quinn 0-3, N Hurley 0-1, D Collins 0-1, S Daly 0-1, A Sheehan 0-1, B McCarthy 0-1.	Referee: P O'Leary (Kilmurry)

7 June 2014 Round 2	Ilen Rovers	1-16 - 0-17 (aet)	Newcestown	Drimoleague
	D Mac Eoin 1-7, K O'Sullivan 0-3, A Holland 0-3, S O'Donovan 0-1, T O'Regan 0-1, Cian O'Driscoll 0-1.		T Twomey 0-6, C Keane 0-3, E Kelly 0-3, M Kelly 0-2, L Meade 0-1, F Keane 0-1, G O'Driscoll 0-1.	Referee: K Murphy (Nemo Rangers)

7 June 2014 Round 2	St. Finbarr's	5-08 - 0-10	St. Vincent's	Páirc Uí Rinn, Cork
	J Sexton 3-4, R O'Mahony 1-0, G O'Connor 1-0, M Shields 0-1, I Power 0-1, A Murphy 0-1, K Hodgins 0-1.		D O'Connor 0-4, S Duggan 0-2, K Lynch 0-1, JP Murphy 0-1, C Barry 0-1, J Buckley 0-1.	Referee: M Collins (Clonakilty)

=== Round 3 ===
22 June 2014 Round 3	Newcestown	1-09 - 0-11	Dohenys	Ballineen
	T Twomey 0-6, C Keane 1-1, F Keane 0-1, D Twomey 0-1.		J McCarthy 0-5, D McCarthy 0-2, P Collins 0-1, M Quinn 0-1, E Lavers 0-1, D Healy 0-1.	Referee: B Coniry (Crosshaven)

8 July 2014 Round 3	Aghada	1-11 - 1-08 (aet)	St. Vincent's	Páirc Séamus de Barra, Carrigtwohill
	T O'Keeffe 1-1, P O'Neill 0-2, M Russell 0-2, C Fleming 0-2, T Hartnett 0-1, R Wall 0-1, S Kennedy 0-1, J Looney 0-1.		D O'Connor 0-4, C Barry 1-0, JP Murphy 0-1, J Buckley 0-1, F Murphy 0-1, D Duggan 0-1.	Referee: B Coniry (Crosshaven)

=== Relegation play-off ===
20 September 2014 Play-off	Dohenys	1-10 - 0-10	St. Vincent's	Kilmurry
	B McCarthy 1-1, A Sheehan 0-4, P McCarthy 0-3, P Collins 0-1, D Healy 0-1.		D O'Connor 0-6, C Barry 0-2, F Murphy 0-1, G Kelleher 0-1.	Referee: N Wall (Carrigaline)

=== Round 4 ===
9 August 2014 Round 4	Bishopstown	0-11 - 0-09	St. Finbarr's	Páirc Uí Rinn, Cork
	S Oakes (0-5, one free), K O’Halloran (two 45s), P Honohan (0-2 each), B Coffey (f), F Desmond (0-1 each).	Report	J Sexton (0-5fs), G O’Connor, A Murphy (f), R O’Mahony, K Hodgins (0-1 each).	Referee: M Collins (Clonakilty)

9 August 2014 Round 4	Nemo Rangers	4-11 - 1-09	Ilen Rovers	Charlie Hurley Park, Bandon
	B O’Driscoll 2-1; C Horgan and D Mehigan 1-1 each; J Horgan 0-3; P Kerrigan (0-1 free) and P Morgan 0-2 each; J Masters 0-1 free.	Report	D Mac Eoin 1-6 (0-4 frees, 0-1 ’45); K O’Sullivan 0-2 frees; C O’Driscoll 0-1.	Referee: J Ryan (Macroom)

9 August 2014 Round 4	Aghada	1-03 - 0-10	Clonakilty	Páirc Uí Rinn, Cork
	E Savage 1-0, C Fleming 0-3.		D O'Regan 0-4, Colin O'Donovan 0-2, J O'Mahony 0-2, Tim Anglin 0-1, I Falvey 0-1.	Referee: P O'Leary (Kilmurry)

10 August 2014 Round 4	Carbery	1-11 - 3-15	Ballincollig	Cloughduv
	D Barron 1-2, M Sugrue 0-5, C O'Driscoll 0-1, S O'Neill 0-1, P Daly 0-1, S Coughlan 0-1.		P Kelly 2-2, C O'Sullivan 0-4, S Kiely 1-0, C Dorgan 0-3, C Kiely 0-2, J Miskella 0-2, G Durrant 0-1, I Coughlan 0-1.	Referee: K Murphy (Nemo Rangers)

16 August 2014 Round 4	Clyda Rovers	1-08 - 0-11	Newcestown	Ballyanley Sportsfield, Inniscarra
	J Murphy (0-5, 4fs), C Flanagan (1-2), P Kissane (0-1).	Report	J Desmond (0-3fs), T Twomey (2fs), M O’Brien (0-2 each), C O’Neill, D Twomey, C Keane and T Horgan (0-1 each).	Referee: B Coniry (Crosshaven)

24 August 2014 Round 4	Douglas	1-06 - 1-14	O'Donovan Rossa	Clonakilty
	E Cadogan 1-0, A Cadogan 0-3, M Harrington 0-2, J Lane 0-1.		P Crowley 1-0, K Davis 0-3, D Óg Hodnett 0-2, T Hegarty 0-2, G Minihane 0-2, I Dineen 0-2, M Collins 0-1, R Long 0-1, C McCarthy 0-1.	Referee: J Bermingham (Bride Rovers)

30 August 2014 Round 4	Castlehaven	1-11 - 1-11	Carbery Rangers	Clonakilty
	B Hurley 1-4, M Collins 0-4, Steven Hurley 0-2, S Hayes 0-1.		J Hayes 0-5, S Hayes 1-0, J O'Rourke 0-2, D Hayes 0-1, J Fitzpatrick 0-1, P Hodnett 0-1, A Jennings 0-1.	Referee: C Lane (Banteer)

5 September 2014 Round 4	St. Nicholas'	1-06 - 4-14	Muskerry	Páirc Uí Rinn, Cork
	R Brosnan 1-1 (1-0 pen.); G Callanan 0-2; T Spain, E Kearney, R McCarthy-Coade (free) 0-1 each.	Report	D Ambrose 2-2; D Goulding 1-3 (0-1 free, 0-1 45); L Shorten 0-3; F Goold 0-2; S Ó Mathuna, C Vaughan, D O’Connell, M Ó Laoire 0-1 each.	Referee: J Bermingham (Bride Rovers)

6 September 2014 Round 4 replay	Clyda Rovers	1-11 - 1-09	Newcestown	Ballyanley Sportsfield, Inniscarra
	S O'Connell 1-4, J Murphy 0-3, P Kissane 0-1, C O'Sullivan 0-1, D O'Callaghan 0-1, S Ronayne 0-1.		C Keane 1-1, M O'Brien 0-3, D Twomey 0-3, T Twomey 0-1, J Desmond 0-1.	Referee: D Murnane (Macroom)

14 September 2014 Round 4 replay	Castlehaven	1-08 - 2-14	Carbery Rangers	Clonakilty
	D Cahalane 1-1, B Hurley 0-4, P Hurley 0-2, S Nolan 0-1.		J Hayes 2-4, S Hayes 0-3, J O'Rourke 0-3, A Jennings 0-2, B Shanahan 0-1, B Hodnett 0-1.	Referee: C Lyons (Nemo Rangers)

=== Quarter-finals ===
6 September 2014 Quarter-final	Nemo Rangers	1-13 - 1-08	O'Donovan Rossa	Sam Maguire Park, Dunmanway
	J Masters (1-4, two frees), P Kerrigan (0-3), B O’Driscoll (0-2), A O’Donovan, J Horgan, L Connolly, W Morgan (0-1 each).	Report	K Davis (0-7, 5fs), C Crowley (1-0), D Shannon (0-1).	Referee: C Lane (Banteer)

20 September 2014 Quarter-final	Bishopstown	0-10 - 0-10	Clyda Rovers	Páirc Uí Chaoimh, Cork
	B Coffey 0-3, S Oaks 0-2, M Power 0-2, F Ó Deasúnaigh 0-2, P Cronin 0-1.		J Murphy 0-5, C Flanagan 0-2, S O'Connell 0-1, Séamus Ronayne 0-1, C O'Sullivan 0-1.	Referee: J Bermingham (Bride Rovers)

21 September 2014 Quarter-final	Carbery Rangers	1-13 - 1-08	Clonakilty	St. Mary's Park, Enniskeane
	J Hayes (1-7, 1-0 pen, 0-3fs), B Shanahan (0-3, 1 45, 1f), S O’Neill (0-2), J O’Rourke (0-1).	Report	D O’Regan (1-1 frees), J Leahy (0-3, 1f), J O’Mahony (0-2, 1f), D Murphy and C O’Donovan (0-1 each).	Referee: C Lane (Banteer)

21 September 2014 Quarter-final	Ballincollig	0-20 - 1-09	Muskerry	Cloughduv
	C Dorgan 0-6, J Kelly 0-4, N Allen 0-3, J Miskella 0-3, P Kelly 0-1, C Kiely 0-1, G Durrant 0-1, I Coughlan 0-1.		F Goold 1-2, D Goudling 0-4, D Ambrose 0-1, L Shorten 0-1, D Twomey 0-1.	Referee: B Coniry (Crosshaven)

27 September 2014 Quarter-final replay	Bishopstown	1-09 - 0-11	Clyda Rovers	Páirc Uí Rinn, Cork
	C Dorman 1-3, S Oaks 0-2, J O'Sullivan 0-1, B Coffey 0-1, D Crowley 0-1, F Ó Deasúnaigh 0-1.		Conor O'Sullivan 0-3, C Flanagan 0-3, J Murphy 0-3, Séamus Ronayne 0-2.	Referee: C Lane (Banteer)

=== Semi-finals ===
5 October 2014 Semi-final	Nemo Rangers	0-09 - 2-10	Ballincollig	Páirc Uí Chaoimh, Cork
	J Masters 0-4 (3f), P Kerrigan (free), J Horgan, B O’Driscoll, A O’Reilly, W Morgan 0-1.	Report	C Dorgan 1-3 (2f), J Kelly 1-0, P Kelly (1f), C O’Sullivan 0-2 each, S Kiely, C Kiely, I Coughlan (free) 0-1.	Referee: M Collins (Clonakilty)

5 October 2014 Semi-final	Bishopstown	1-07 - 2-17	Carbery Rangers	Páirc Uí Chaoimh, Cork
	P Cronin (1-0), S Oakes (0-3, 1f), D Lester, J O’Sullivan, M O’Driscoll and F Desmond (0-1 each).	Report	B Hodnett (1-2), J Hayes (0-5, 3fs), J O’Rourke (0-4), D Hayes (0-3), K McMahon (1-0), B Shanahan (f), J Fitzpatrick, S Murray (0-1 each).	Referee: J Bermingham (Bride Rovers)

=== Final ===
19 October 2014 Final	Ballincollig	1-13 - 1-10	Carbery Rangers	Páirc Uí Chaoimh, Cork
	C Dorgan 0-6 (4f), J Kelly 1-0, I Coughlan (2f), C Kiely 0-2 each, L Prendergast, S Kiely, N Allen, C O'Sullivan 0-1 each.	Report	S Hayes 1-2, J Hayes 0-3 (2f), B Shanahan 0-2 ('45s), J O'Rourke, S O'Neill, S Murray 0-1 each.	Referee: J Bermingham (Bride Rovers)

== Championship statistics ==
=== Top scorers ===
Top scorers overall

Rank	Player	Club	Tally	Total	Matches	Average
1	John Hayes	Carbery Rangers	5-28	43	6	7.16
2	Cian Dorgan	Ballincollig	1-21	24	5	4.80
3	Brian Hurley	Castlehaven	3-14	23	3	7.66
4	Dan Mac Eoin	O'Donovan Rossa	2-16	22	3	7.33
5	James Masters	Nemo Rangers	2-14	20	4	5.00
5	Derek O'Connor	Nemo Rangers	1-17	20	4	5.00
5	Mark Sugrue	Carbery	0-20	20	3	6.66
6	James Murphy	Clyda Rovers	0-19	19	5	3.80
7	Jason Sexton	St. Finbarr's	3-09	18	2	9.00
8	Séamus Hayes	Carbery Rangers	3-08	17	6	3.40
8	Sam Oakes	Bishopstown	1-14	17	5	3.40

Top scorers in a single game

Rank	Player	Club	Tally	Total	Opposition
1	Jason Sexton	St. Finbarr's	3-04	13	St. Vincent's
2	Brian Hurley	Castlehaven	2-06	12	St. Vincent's
3	Mark Sugrue	Carbery	0-11	11	Avondhu
4	Colm O'Driscoll	Carbery	3-01	10	Seandún
4	John Hayes	Carbery Rangers	2-04	10	Castlehaven
4	John Hayes	Carbery Rangers	2-04	10	Aghada
4	John Hayes	Carbery Rangers	1-07	10	Clonakilty
4	Dan Mac Eoin	Ilen Rovers	1-07	10	Newcestown
5	Luke Connolly	Nemo Rangers	1-06	9	Dohenys
5	Dan Mac Eoin	Ilen Rovers	1-06	9	Nemo Rangers
5	David Shannon	O'Donovan Rossa	0-09	9	Aghada

=== Miscellaneous ===
- Ballincollig win their first title in what was also their first appearance in the final.
- Carbery Rangers make the clubs first appearance in a SFC final since 1906.
