= 2004–05 All-Ireland Intermediate Club Football Championship =

Irish Gaelic football competition

- Dates: 24 October 2004 - 28 March 2005
- Teams: 33
- Sponsor: Allied Irish Bank
- Champions: Carbery Rangers (1st title); Johnny Murphy (captain); Michael Paul Hicks (manager)
- Runners-up: Pomeroy Plunketts; Kieran McKenna (captain); Raymond Munroe (manager)

Tournament statistics
- Matches played: 34
- Goals scored: 82 (2.41 per match)
- Points scored: 568 (16.71 per match)

The 2004–05 All-Ireland Intermediate Club Football Championship was the second staging of the All-Ireland Intermediate Club Football Championship since its establishment by the Gaelic Athletic Association for the 2003–04 season. The championship ran from 24 October 2004 to 28 March 2005.

The All-Ireland final was played on 28 March 2005 at O'Moore Park in Portlaoise, between Carbery Rangers and Pomeroy Plunketts. Carbery Rangers won the match by 1-14 to 1-08 to claim their first ever championship title.

== Connacht Intermediate Club Football Championship ==
=== Connacht quarter-final ===
4 December 2004 Quarter-final	Breaffy	0-06 - 1-08	Calry-St Joseph's	Breaffy Grounds
	A Durcan 0-4, G Jennings 0-1, JP Gibbons 0-1.		B O'Reilly 1-4, F Horan 0-2, S Boyd 0-1, C Maguire 0-1.

=== Connacht semi-finals ===
15 January 2005 Semi-final	Western Gaels	1-09 - 1-07	Dunmore MacHales	Frenchpark Grounds
	D Moran 0-6, G Nolan 1-0, U Mulleady 0-2, S McDermott 0-1.		C Donnellan 1-2, T Gilmore 0-2, D Cronin 0-1, G Byrnes B Higgins 0-1.

15 January 2005 Semi-final	Calry-St Joseph's	1-15 - 1-09 (aet)	Dromhair	Markievicz Park
	A Maguire 0-5, E McGowan 1-1, B O'Reilly 0-3, F Horan 0-1, B Hayes 0-1, L McGuinn 0-1, D Gannon 0-1, S Boyd 0-1, V Nally 0-1.		K Meehan 1-4, C McMorrow 0-2, C McGowan 0-2, J Evans 0-1.

=== Connacht final ===
29 January 2005 Final	Western Gaels	1-10 - 0-07	Calry-St Joseph's	Frenchpark Grounds
	G Nolan 1-1, U Mulready 0-2, N Murray 0-2, C Gregg 0-1, D Moran 0-1, T Gill 0-1, M Drury 0-1, K McCrann 0-1.		B Reilly 0-5, F Horan 0-1, V Nally 0-1.

== Leinster Intermediate Club Football Championship ==
=== Leinster first round ===
13 November 2004 First round	Wolfe Tones	1-10 - 2-05	Ballymore	Páirc Mhic Eoin
	T Dowd 0-6, P Fitzpatrick 1-0, J Tiernan 0-4.		D McElvaney 1-0, K Duffy 1-0, B McElvaney 0-3, J Murphy 0-2.

13 November 2004 First round	Dreadnots	3-08 - 1-10	Ballyhogue	Clogherhead Grounds
	G Shevlin 3-1, C Kelly 0-5, R Connolly 0-1, P McGuigan 0-1.		S Ring 0-5, E Galavan 1-0, D Kennedy 0-2, N Kennedy 0-1, H Carr 0-1.

13 November 2004 First round	Erin's Own	1-05 - 0-07	Tinryland	Prince Grounds
	R Ryan 1-1, A Holden 0-2, M Coogan 0-1, D Buggy 0-1.		J Doyle 0-4, P Kenny 0-1, A Barrett 0-1, P Doyle 0-1.

13 November 2004 First round	Avondale	3-05 - 1-09	Clonbullogue	Avondale Grounds
	F Olohan 2-0, S Birch 1-0, I Heffernan 0-3, M Sheehan 0-1, B Sheehan 0-1.		G Quinn 1-3, N Guing 0-2, N Quinn 0-2, P Quinn 0-1, T Crampton 0-1.

=== Leinster quarter-finals ===
20 November 2004 Quarter-final	Dreadnots	1-07 - 0-06	Timahoe	Clogherhead Grounds
	C Kelly 0-6, K Shevlin 1-0, P Connolly 0-1.		W Lawlor 0-5, P Clancy 0-1.

20 November 2004 Quarter-final	Avondale	2-10 - 2-09	St. Mary's	Avondale Grounds
	F Olohan 1-3, I Heffernan 0-4, B Sheehan 1-0, C Doyle 0-2, B Byrne 0-1.		I Cunningham 1-2, D O'Mahony 0-4, M Geraghty 1-0, I Bradley 0-1, D Mulligan 0-1, B Pierce 0-1.

20 November 2004 Quarter-final	Wolfe Tones	2-06 - 0-06	Parnells	Páirc Mhic Eoin

23 November 2004 Quarter-final	Naas	3-10 - 1-05	Erin's Own	St. Laurence's Park
	E O'Callaghan 1-5, J McDonald 1-1, M Hennessy 1-1, J Brosnan 0-1, A Hennessy 0-1, K Curtis 0-1.		S Healy 1-0, E Brennan 0-3, S Kennedy 0-1, D Dunne 0-1.

=== Leinster semi-finals ===
27 November 2004 Semi-final	Wolfe Tones	2-13 - 1-07	Avondale	Páirc Mhic Eoin
				Referee: N Corcoran (Dublin)

28 November 2004 Semi-final	Dreadnots	4-05 - 2-13	Naas	Clogherhead Grounds
	G Shevlin 2-1, R Connolly 1-1, P McGuigan 1-0, C Kelly 0-3.		E Callaghan 1-3, N Farragher 0-6, J Brosnan 1-1, G McLoughlin 0-1, K Curtis 0-1, B Minogue 0-1.

=== Leinster final ===
4 December 2004 Final	Wolfe Tones	1-10 - 0-08	Naas	Páirc Mhic Eoin
	T Dowd 0-5, D McGrath 1-1, S Corrigan 0-2, P Caffrey 0-1, E Harrington 0-1.		N Farragher 0-6, N Hennessy 0-1, K Curtis 0-1.

== Munster Intermediate Club Football Championship ==
=== Munster quarter-finals ===
27 November 2004 Quarter-final	Gaultier	5-07 - 0-06	Mungret	Walsh Park
	W Hutchinson 1-2, P Foley 0-4, D Tiernan 1-0, A Moloney 1-0, E Kirwan 1-0, G O'Connor 1-0, B Mullane 0-1.		M Reidy 0-5, D Horan 0-1.

27 November 2004 Quarter-final	Dingle	0-08 - 0-08	Carbery Rangers	Páirc an Ághsaigh
	M Evans 0-5, K Murphy 0-3.		S Hayes 0-4, M Moore 0-3, J Murphy 0-1.

5 December 2004 Semi-final replay	Carbery Rangers	0-15 - 1-07	Dingle	Rosscarbery Grounds
	M Moore 0-4, K McMahon 0-3, D Hayes 0-2, N Hayes 0-2, S Hayes 0-2, M O'Sullivan 0-1, G Ryan 0-1.		K Murphy 1-4, M Evans 0-1, S Dowd 0-1, D Geaney 0-1.

=== Munster semi-finals ===
5 December 2004 Semi-final	Gaultier	1-05 - 0-04	Killenaule	Walsh Park
	D Tiernan 1-0, P Foley 0-3, A Fitzgerald 0-2. goals2 = T Doyle 0-2, M Brennan 0-1, J Caesar 0-1.

12 December 2004 Semi-final	Carbery Rangers	2-21 - 1-03	Cratloe	Rosscarbery Grounds
	J Hayes 1-4, D Hayes 1-2, M Moore 0-3, Séamus Hayes 0-3, K McMahon 0-2, M Ronan 0-2, M Moloney 0-2, M O'Sullivan 0-1, J Murphy 0-1, S Hicks 0-1.		S Chaplin 1-0, P Chaplin 0-1, K Browne 0-1, G Ryan 0-1.

=== Munster final ===
19 December 2004 Final	Carbery Rangers	0-14 - 1-05	Gaultier	Páirc Mac Gearailt
	M Moore 0-4, S Hayes 0-2, J Hayes 0-2, J Murphy 0-2, M O'Sullivan 0-2, N Hayes 0-1, D Hayes 0-1.		G O'Connor 1-0, A Fitzgerald 0-3, P Foley 0-1, P Fitzgerald 0-1.	Referee: P Sheehy (Kerry)

== Ulster Intermediate Club Football Championship ==
=== Ulster preliminary round ===
24 October 2004 Preliminary round	Carrickcruppin	1-09 - 0-07	Ballybay	Páirc Esler
	P Loughran 1-1, P Keenan 0-2, D Campbell 0-2, A Bennett 0-1, M Rice 0-1, G Morgan 0-1, S Kane 0-1.		P Finlay 0-3, B McCabe 0-2, K Finlay 0-1, P Kerr 0-1.

=== Ulster quarter-finals ===
7 November 2004 Quarter-final	Foreglen	1-06 - 0-08	Buncrana	Watty Graham Park

7 November 2004 Quarter-final	Atticall	3-11 - 0-11	Lacken Celtic	St. Patrick's Park
	G Morgan 0-5, M Trainor 1-1, P Sloan 1-0, P Trainor 1-0, Michael Sloan 0-3, K Morgan 0-1, S Fitzpatrick 0-1.		F O'Reilly 0-5, C Sheridan 0-3, J Moynagh 0-1, Joseph Crowe 0-1, R Galligan 0-1.

7 November 2004 Quarter-final	Irvinestown St. Molaise	0-10 - 1-07	Moneyglass	St. Molaise Park

7 November 2004 Quarter-final	Carrickcruppin	2-05 - 2-15	Pomeroy Plunketts	Healy Park
	P Loughran 1-2, D Campbell 1-0, P Keenan 0-2, S Kane 0-1.		C Slane 1-4, O McCreesh 1-1, C McKenna 0-2, C Colhoun 0-2, J Quinn 0-2, M Corr 0-1, C McKenna 0-1, M Quinn 0-1, A McCreesh 0-1.

21 November 2004 Quarter-final replay	Moneyglass	3-07 - 1-05	Irvinestown St. Molaise	Casement Park

=== Ulster semi-finals ===
21 November 2004 Semi-final	Pomeroy Plunketts	1-09 - 1-06	Atticall	St. Oliver Plunkett Park

28 November 2004 Semi-final	Moneyglass	2-08 - 1-06	Foreglen	Healy Park

=== Ulster final ===
5 December 2004 Final	Moneyglass	0-07 - 1-13	Pomeroy Plunketts	Casement Park
	A McKeefrey 0-2, L Brady 0-1, C Duffin 0-1, J Marron 0-1, P McErlean 0-1, K Brady 0-1.		M McCourt 1-3, A McCreesh 0-3, C Slane 0-2, McCreesh 0-2, K McKenna 0-2, S McKenna 0-1.

== All-Ireland Intermediate Club Football Championship ==
=== All-Ireland quarter-final ===
5 December 2004 Final	St. Peter's	1-03 - 5-14	Pomeroy Plunketts	Old Bedians
	T Greenhaugh 1-0, K O'Hara 0-1, B McMahon 0-1, R Gallagher 0-1.		C McKenna 3-1, C Slane 0-7, C Colhoun 1-1, M McCourt 1-0, J Quinn 0-3, C Cunningham 0-1, B Conway 0-1.

=== All-Ireland semi-finals ===
20 February 2005 Final	Carbery Rangers	3-10 - 0-07	Western Gaels	Cusack Park
	J Hayes 0-5, K McMahon 1-1, S Hayes 1-0, D Hayes 1-0, M Moore 0-3, M O'Sullivan 0-1.		C Cregg 0-2, T Gill 0-2, D Moran 0-1, G Nolan 0-1, N Murray 0-1.	Referee: T Quigley (Wexford)

20 February 2005 Final	Pomeroy Plunketts	1-07 - 0-07	Wolfe Tones	Kingspan Breffni Park
	C Slane 1-4, C McKenna 0-1, A McCreesh 0-1, M Corr 0-1.		C Ward 0-4, E Harrington 0-1, A Fox 0-1, K McKeever 0-1.	Referee: T Quigley (Wexford)

=== All-Ireland final ===
28 March 2005 Final	Carbery Rangers	1-14 - 1-08	Pomeroy Plunketts	O'Moore Park
	M Moore 1-4 (1-0 pen); J Hayes 0-6 (0-1 free); D Hayes 0-2; S Hayes and M O'Sullivan 0-1 each.		C Slane 1-2 (1-1 frees); A McCreesh 0-3 frees; K McKenna 0-2; O McCreesh 0-1.	Referee: M Deegan (Laois)

== Championship statistics ==
=== Miscellaneous ===
- The father of Carbery Rangers' goalkeeper, Kevin Santry, died suddenly on the morning of the All-Ireland final.
