= Donncha O'Connor =

Irish Gaelic footballer

Personal information
- Native name: Donncha Ó Conchubhair (Irish)
- Born: 25 April 1981 (age 45) Ballydesmond, County Cork, Ireland
- Occupation: GAA coaching officer/Plumber.
- Height: 6 ft 2 in (188 cm)

Sport
- Sport: Gaelic football
- Position: Full Forward
Club
- Years: Club
- 1998–: Ballydesmond
Club titles
- Cork titles: 1
Inter-county*
Years	County	Apps (scores)
2006–2018	Cork	54 (12-152)
Inter-county titles
- Munster titles: 4
- All-Irelands: 1
- *Inter County team apps and scores correct as of 15:29, 23 July 2018.

Donncha O'Connor (born 25 April 1981) is an Irish Gaelic footballer who played as a full-forward for the Cork senior team. He joined the team during the 2006 championship and immediately became a regular member of the starting fifteen. O'Connor is Cork's all-time top scorer. He has won one All-Ireland winners' medal, four Munster winners' medals and three National League winners' medal. He has ended up as an All-Ireland runner-up on two occasions.

At club level O'Connor plays with Ballydesmond and divisional side Duhallow.

== Playing career ==
=== Club ===
O'Connor plays his club football with the Ballydesmond club and the Duhallow divisional side and has enjoyed some success.

After enjoying much success at all grades as a juvenile player, O'Connor broke onto Ballydesmond's junior team by the late nineties. After facing defeat in the divisional junior championship final in 2005, the team qualified for the championship decider again in 2007. Dromtarriffe provided the opposition, however, O'Connor won a divisional title following a 1–10 to 0–8 victory.

=== Inter-county ===
O'Connor never played for Cork at minor or under-21 levels, however, he made a name for himself as a member of the county's junior football team in 2005. That year he came on as a substitute to win a Munster junior medal following a 2–13 to 0–8 defeat of Kerry. O'Connor later added an All-Ireland title to his collection following a 0–10 to 1–4 win over Meath.

In 2006 O'Connor made his senior debut for Cork when he came on as a substitute for Nicholas Murphy in a National Football League game against Offaly. Later that year he made his championship debut as a substitute against Limerick in the Munster semi-final. He was included in the starting fifteen for the provincial final against Kerry, however, that game ended in a 0–10 apiece draw. O'Connor retained his position on the full-forward line for the replay and collected his first Munster senior medal following a 1–12 to 0–9 win. Kerry later avenged this defeat by beating Cork in the All-Ireland semi-final.

O'Connor was very much a key member of the forwards again in 2007. He was one of the team's top scorers throughout the championship as Cork surrendered their provincial title but reached their first All-Ireland final since 1999. Age-old rivals Kerry were the opponents in the first all-Munster All-Ireland final. It was a game to forget for Cork as Kerry triumphed by 3–13 to 1–9.

In 2008 'the Rebels' gained a modicum of revenge on Kerry when the sides met in that year's Munster final. Kerry were cruising by eight points at the interval, however, Cork stormed back in the second-half. Kerry could only muster three points as Cork secured a remarkable 1–16 to 1–11 victory. It was O'Connor's second Munster winners' medal. Both sides met again in the All-Ireland semi-final, however, after a thrilling draw and a replay Kerry were the team that advanced to the championship decider.

Cork reached the National League division two final in 2009, having recorded only one defeat in the seven group stage games. Monaghan provided the opposition, however, Cork won the game by 1–14 to 0–12. It was O'Connor's first National League title. He later claimed a third Munster winners' medal following a narrow 2–6 to 0–11 defeat of Limerick. Cork later qualified for the All-Ireland final where arch-rivals Kerry provided the opposition for the second time in three years. Surprisingly, the men from 'the Kingdom' went into the game as slight underdogs. This tag appeared to be justified when Cork raced to a 1–3 to 0–1 early in the opening half. The Kerry team stuck to their game plan, helped in no small part by a Cork side that recorded fourteen wides. At the final whistle Kerry were the champions by 0–16 to 1–9.

2010 saw Cork bounce back from the All-Ireland defeat by claiming the top flight National League title with a 1–17 to 0–12 defeat of Mayo in the final. It was O'Connor's first division one National League title. Cork were later defeated by Kerry in the provincial series but qualified for a second consecutive All-Ireland final by taking the scenic route through the qualifiers. Down provided the opposition and a tight game developed on a rain-soaked day. O'Connor chipped in with five points as Cork triumphed by 0–16 to 0–15. It was O'Connor's first All-Ireland winners' medal and Cork's first championship title in twenty years.

In 2011 Cork retained their status as top flight National League champions following a 0–21 to 2–14 defeat of Dublin in the final. It was O'Connor's second winners' medal in that competition. Cork later qualified for their first Munster final in two years, however, Kerry retained their provincial title with a 1–15 to 1–12 victory. Cork's championship campaign later ended with a tame All-Ireland quarter-final defeat by Mayo.

=== Inter-provincial ===
O'Connor has also lined out with Munster in the now defunct inter-provincial series of games. He was first included on the team in 2007 when Munster were defeated by Ulster.

O'Connor was on the half-forward line in 2008 when Munster defeated Connacht by 1–09 to 0–7 to take their first Railway Cup title since 1999.

In 2009 O'Connor had the distinction of being captain of the very last Munster team to represent the province in the Railway Cup. For the second time in three years Munster were beaten by Ulster.

== Career statistics ==
Team	Year	National League			Munster		All-Ireland		Total	
Team	Year	Division	Apps	Score	Apps	Score	Apps	Score	Apps	Score
Cork	2006	Division 1A	3	1-01	3	0-02	2	0-03	8	1-06
Cork	2007	Division 1A	4	2-04	3	1-09	4	0-17	11	3-30
Cork	2008	Division 2	6	1-08	2	0-06	3	0-08	11	1-22
Cork	2009	Division 2	4	0-11	4	3-14	3	0-11	11	3-36
Cork	2010	Division 1	6	0-16	2	0-06	4	1-15	12	1-37
Cork	2011	Division 1	5	2-15	3	2-06	2	2-09	10	6-30
Cork	2012	Division 1	9	1-26	2	0-08	2	0-04	13	1-38
Cork	2013	Division 1	5	1-10	3	0-03	2	0-00	10	1-13
Cork	2014	Division 1	6	0-07	0	0-00	1	1-03	7	1-10
Cork	2015	Division 1	5	0-13	3	2-09	1	0-05	9	2-27
Cork	2016	Division 1	1	0-00	1	0-03	0	0-00	2	0-03
Cork	2017	Division 2	5	0-01	3	0-17	0	0-00	8	0-18
Cork	2018	Division 2	3	0-00	0	0-00	1	0-00	4	0-00
Total			62	8-112	29	8-77	25	4-75	116	20-264

== Honours ==
- 4 Munster Senior Football Championship 2006 2008 2009 2012
- 3 National Football League Division 1 2010 2011 2012
- 1 National Football League Division 2 2009
- 1 All-Ireland Senior Football Championship 2010
- 1 All-Ireland Junior Football Championship 2005
- 1 Munster Junior Football Championship 2005
- 1 Railway Cup 2008
