= Carbery Rangers GAA =

Irish Gaelic Athletic Association club

Carbery Rangers
- Raonaithe Cairbre
- Founded: 1887
- County: Cork
- Colours: Green, white and gold hoops
- Grounds: Rosscarbery
- Coordinates: 51°35′03.76″N 9°01′28.73″W

Playing kits
Standard colours

Senior Club Championships
	All Ireland	Munster champions	Cork champions
Football:	0	0	1

Carbery Rangers is a Gaelic Athletic Association club located in the village of Rosscarbery, County Cork, Ireland. The club is solely concerned with the game of Gaelic football.

== History ==
Located in Rosscarbery in West Cork, Carbery Rangers was founded on 10 November 1887. The club played its first match just under a month later in a field which was part of the lands of Downeen Castle. Carbery Rangers first came to countywide notice when they contested and lost back-to-back Cork SFC finals in 1905 and 1906.

Carbery Rangers spent much of the following century operating in the junior grade, winning ten West Cork JAFC titles between 1937 and 2003. The last of these victories was subsequently converted into Cork JAFC and Munster Club JFC titles, before losing the All-Ireland final to Wolfe Tones. Life in the intermediate grade yielded further successes, including consecutive Munster Club IFC titles as well as the All-Ireland Club IFC title in 2005.

After finally earning senior status, Carbery Rangers reached the 2014 final, only to lose to Ballincollig by three points. A second final appearance in 2016 saw Carbery Rangers claim the Cork SFC for the first time in their history.

== Honours ==
- Cork Senior Football Championship: Winners (1) 2016, Runners-Up 1905, 1906, 2014
- Kelleher Shield (Senior Football League) Winners (3) 2009, 2011, 2014 Runners-Up 2013
- All Ireland Scór na nÓg Ballad Group Champions - 2018
- All Ireland Scór Sinsir Ballad Group Champions - 2018
- All-Ireland Intermediate Club Football Championship Winners (1) 2005
- Munster Intermediate Club Football Championship Winners (2) 2004, 2005
- Cork Intermediate Football Championship: Winners (1) 2005, Runners-Up 2004
- All-Ireland Junior Club Football Championship Runners-Up 2004
- Munster Junior Club Football Championship Winners (1) 2003
- Cork Junior Football Championship: Winners (1) 2003, Runners-Up 1939, 1987
- Cork Minor Football Championship: Runners Up 1955,
- West Cork Junior A Football Championship: Winners (10) 1937, 1938, 1939, 1940, 1980, 1984, 1987, 1991, 1998, 2003. Runners-Up: 1942, 1943, 1945, 1946, 1955, 1956, 1973, 1975, 1978, 1992, 1995, 1996, 1999, 2000
- West Cork Junior B Football Championship: Winners (1) 1954
- West Cork Junior B Hurling Championship: Winners (1) 1942 Runners Up 1962, 1963
- West Cork Junior C Football Championship: Winners (5) 1991, 1994, 1995, 1997, 2001, Runners Up 1981, 1989, 1993, 2003
- West Cork Junior D Football Championship: Winners (2) 2004, 2019
- West Cork Minor A Football Championship: Winners (3) 1955, 1956, 1992, 2006, Runners Up 1993, 2003, 2006
- West Cork Minor B Hurling Championship: Runners Up 1973, 1975
- West Cork Minor B Football Championship: Winners (8) 1966, 1967, 1968, 1972, 1975, 1979, 1990, 2005, Runners Up: 1970, 1971, 1973, 1976, 1989
- West Cork Under-21 Football Championship: Winners (1) 1995 Runners-Up: 1981, 1992
- West Cork Under-21 C Hurling Championship: Winners (1) 2012
- West Cork Under-14 Premier Championship: Winners (1) 2005

== Notable players ==
- John Hayes: All-Ireland SFC-winner (2010)
- Robbie Kiely: Munster SFC-winner (2020)
- Kevin McMahon: All-Ireland SFC-winner (2010)
- Tony Murphy: All-Ireland JFC-winner (1972)
- Fachtna O'Donovan: All-Ireland SFC-winner (1945)
- John O'Rourke: All-Ireland MFC runner-up (2010)
- Micheál O'Sullivan: National Football League-winner (1998–99)
