= John Hayes (Gaelic footballer) =

Irish Gaelic footballer

Personal information
- Native name: Seán Ó hAodha (Irish)
- Born: Rosscarbery, County Cork, Ireland

Sport
- Sport: Gaelic Football
- Position: Left corner forward
Club
Years	Club	Apps (scores)
2003-present	Carbery Rangers	59 (19-269)
Club titles
- Cork titles: 2
- Munster titles: 2
- All-Ireland Titles: 1
Inter-county
- Years: County
- 2005-2013: Cork

John 'The Footballer' Hayes is an Irish Gaelic football player. He is viewed as being instrumental in his club, Carbery Rangers, winning county championships at junior, intermediate and senior level, Munsters, and an All-Ireland Intermediate Club Football Championship in 2005. In the meantime, he established himself at left corner forward on the Cork senior football team winning an All Ireland Football Championship in 2010.

== Honours ==
Carbery Rangers

- Cork Senior Football Championship: (1) 2016
- Kelleher Shield (Senior Football League) (3) 2009, 2011, 2014
- Cork Intermediate Football Championship: (1) 2005
- Munster Intermediate Club Football Championship (2) 2004, 2005
- All-Ireland Intermediate Club Football Championship (1) 2005
- Cork Junior Football Championship: (1) 2003
- Munster Junior Club Football Championship (1) 2004

Cork

- Munster Senior Football Championship (4) 2006, 2008, 2009, 2012
- All-Ireland Senior Football Championship (1) 2010
- National Football League (1) 2010
- Munster Under-21 Football Championship (3) 2004, 2005, 2006

== Career statistics ==
=== Club ===
Team	Season	Cork		Munster		All-Ireland		Total	
Team	Season	Apps	Score	Apps	Score	Apps	Score	Apps	Score
Carbery Rangers	2006-07	1	0-01	—		—		1	0-01
Carbery Rangers	2007-08	5	1-23	—		—		5	1-23
Carbery Rangers	2008-09	2	0-06	—		—		2	0-06
Carbery Rangers	2009-10	4	1-20	—		—		4	1-20
Carbery Rangers	2010-11	6	1-25	—		—		6	1-25
Carbery Rangers	2011-12	5	1-23	—		—		5	1-23
Carbery Rangers	2012-13	4	2-20	—		—		4	2-20
Carbery Rangers	2013-14	3	0-20	—		—		3	0-20
Carbery Rangers	2014-15	6	5-28	—		—		6	5-28
Carbery Rangers	2015-16	5	1-18	—		—		5	1-18
Carbery Rangers	2016-17	5	2-27	2	2-06	—		7	4-33
Carbery Rangers	2017-18	4	1-17	—		—		4	1-17
Carbery Rangers	2018-19	4	0-15	—		—		4	0-15
Carbery Rangers	2019-20	3	2-20	—		—		3	2-20
Carbery Rangers	2020-21	2	0-03	—		—		2	0-03
Carbery Rangers	2021-22	2	0-02	—		—		2	0-02
Carbery Rangers	2022-23	4	0-05	—		—		4	0-05
Carbery Rangers	2023-24	3	0-00	—		—		3	0-00
Career total		68	17-273	2	2-06	—		70	19-279
