= Liam O'Donovan (Gaelic footballer) =

Irish Gaelic footballer and hurler

Personal information
- Native name: Liam Ó Donnabháin (Irish)
- Nickname: Casey
- Born: 1998 (age 27–28) Clonakilty, County Cork, Ireland
- Occupation: Teacher

Sport
- Sport: Gaelic Football
- Position: Right wing-back
Club*
Years	Club	Apps (scores)
2016-present	Clonakilty	17 (0-05)
Club titles
- Cork titles: 0
College
- Years: College
- 2016-2020: University College Cork
College titles
- Sigerson titles: 1
Inter-county**
Years	County	Apps (scores)
2019-present	Cork	5 (0-02)
Inter-county titles
- Munster titles: 0
- All-Irelands: 0
- NFL: 0
- All Stars: 0
- * club appearances and scores correct as of 21:51, 14 November 2021. **Inter County team apps and scores correct as of 13:34, 29 September 2019.

Liam O'Donovan (born 1998) is an Irish Gaelic footballer who plays for Cork Senior Championship club Clonakilty and at inter-county level with the Cork senior football team. He usually lines out as a right wing-back.

== Playing career ==
=== Clonakilty Community College ===
O'Donovan first came to prominence as a Gaelic footballer with Clonakilty Community College. He played in every grade of Gaelic football before eventually joining the college's senior hurling team and lined out in several Corn Uí Mhuirí campaigns.

=== University College Cork ===
As a student at University College Cork, O'Donovan joined the senior football team during his second year. On 20 February 2019, he was an unused substitute when UCC defeated St Mary's University College by 0–16 to 1–09 to win the Sigerson Cup.

=== Clonakilty ===
O'Donovan joined the Clonakilty club when at a young age and played in all grades at juvenile and underage levels. On 5 October 2015, he was at left wing-back when Clonakilty defeated Bantry Blues by 3–13 to 0–08 to win the Premier 2 Minor Championship for the second time in three seasons.

On 7 May 2016, O'Donovan made his first appearance for the Clonakilty senior team. He lined out at centre-back in a 0–13 to 0–14 defeat by Castlehaven in the Cork Senior Championship.

=== Cork ===
==== Minor and under-20 ====
O'Donovan first lined out for Cork as a member of the minor team during the 2016 Munster Championship. He was appointed vice-captain for the year and made his first appearance for the team on 13 April 2016 when he lined out at left corner-back in a 1–14 to 1–11 defeat of Tipperary. O'Donovan retained his position at left corner-back when Cork suffered a 3–14 to 3–08 defeat by Kerry in the Munster final on 3 July 2016.

O'Donovan was drafted onto the Cork under-21 team for the 2017 Munster Championship. He made his first appearance for the team on 15 March 2017 when he came on as a half-time substitute for Maidhcí Ó Duinnín in a 2–10 to 0–10 defeat of Limerick. On 29 March 2017, O'Donovan was selected on the bench but was a late inclusion at left wing-forward when Cork suffered a 2–16 to 0–06 defeat by Kerry in the Munster final.

O'Donovan was appointed captain of the Cork under-20 team for the 2018 Munster Championship. He lined out at left corner-back when Cork were defeated by Kerry by 3–11 to 0–14 in the Munster final on 29 June 2018.

==== Senior ====
O'Donovan was added to the Cork senior team in advance of the 2019 season. He made his first appearance for the team on 12 January 2019 when he lined out at left wing-back in a 1–09 to 0–09 defeat by Clare in the McGrath Cup final. O'Donovan made his first appearance in the National League on 27 January 2019 when he came on as a 56th-minute substitute for James Loughrey in a 1–05 to 0–08 draw with Fermanagh. On 22 June 2019, he was at left win-back when Cork suffered a 1–19 to 3–10 defeat by Kerry in the Munster final.

On 9 July 2020, it was confirmed that O'Donovan would miss the rest of the club and inter-county season after suffering a cruciate ligament tear in a club challenge the previous weekend.

== Honours ==
University College Cork

- Sigerson Cup (1): 2019

Clonakilty

- Cork Premier 2 Minor Football Championship (1): 2015

== Career statistics ==
=== Club ===
As of match played 14 November 2021.

Team	Year	Cork PSFC	
Team	Year	Apps	Score
Clonakilty	2016	3	0-00
Clonakilty	2017	3	0-00
Clonakilty	2018	4	0-03
Clonakilty	2019	3	0-01
Clonakilty	2020	0	0-00
Clonakilty	2021	4	0-01
Career total		17	0-05

=== Inter-county ===
As of match played 25 July 2021.

Team	Year	National League			Munster		All-Ireland		Total	
Team	Year	Division	Apps	Score	Apps	Score	Apps	Score	Apps	Score
Cork	2019	Division 2	3	0-01	2	0-00	3	0-02	8	0-03
Cork	2020	Division 3	4	0-01	—		—		4	0-01
Cork	2021	Division 2	0	0-00	0	0-00	—		0	0-00
Career total			7	0-02	2	0-00	3	0-02	12	0-04

Sporting positions
Preceded by Seán O'Donoghue	Cork Under-20 Football Team Captain; 2018	Succeeded by Peter O'Driscoll
