= 2019 Cork Senior Football Championship =

Cork Senior Football championship 2019

- Dates: 18 March 2019 – 27 October 2019
- Teams: 28
- Sponsor: The Echo
- Champions: Nemo Rangers (21st title); Barry O'Driscoll (captain); Paul O'Donovan (manager)
- Runners-up: Duhallow; Lorcan O'Neill (captain); Pádraig Kearns (manager)

Tournament statistics
- Matches played: 37
- Goals scored: 82 (2.22 per match)
- Points scored: 870 (23.51 per match)
- Top scorer(s): John Hayes (2-20)

The 2019 Cork Senior Football Championship was the 131st staging of the Cork Senior Football Championship since its establishment by the Cork County Board in 1887. The draw for the opening round fixtures took place on 15 January 2019. The championship began on 18 March 2019 and ended on 27 October 2019.

St. Finbarr's entered the championship as the defending champions, however, they were beaten by Nemo Rangers at the quarter-final stage. Femoy secured promotion to the top tier championship after a 54-year absence.

On 27 October 2019, Nemo Rangers won the championship after a 2–08 to 0–10 defeat of Duhallow in the final at Páirc Uí Rinn. It was their 21st championship overall and their first title since 2017. It was a second successive final defeat for Duhallow.

John Hayes from the Carbery Rangers club was the championship's top scorer with 2-20.

== Team changes ==
=== To Championship ===
Promoted from the Cork Premier Intermediate Football Championship

- Fermoy

== Results ==
=== Divisional/colleges section ===
18 March 2019 Preliminary round	Avondhu	1-08 - 1-15	Muskerry	Páirc Uí Rinn, Cork
	J Walsh (1-0), J Sheehan (0-3, 0-1 free), J Browne (free), S O’Neill, L Cronin, C O’Mahony and R Fowley (0-1 each).	Report	M Healy (0-7, 0-5 frees), J Moynihan (1-0), F Goold (0-3, 0-1 free), A Murphy (0-2), B Cronin, C Cotter and D Horgan (0-1 each).	Referee: C Ó Murchú (BRian Dillons)

18 March 2019 Round 1	Imokilly	0-13 - 2-22	Duhallow	Páirc Uí Rinn, Cork
	P O’Neill 0-5, T Harnett 0-3, S Long 0-2f, C Ruddy 0-1, D Harrington 0-1f, M Kelly 0-1f.	Report	D O’Connor 0-7, (0-2 f), E McSweeney 0-4, F O’Connor 1-1, (0-1f), L O’Neill 1-1, S Hickey 0-2, A O’Connor 0-2, D O’Keeffe 0-2, C O’Keeffe 0-2, (0-1 free), J F O’Connor 0-1.	Referee: P O'Leary (Kilmurry)

18 March 2019 Round 1	Seandún	1-12 - 0-07	Beara	Sam Maguire Park, Dunmanway
	E Buckley (1-3, 2 frees), D Cremin (0-5, 3 frees), S Duggan (0-2), G McCarthy (1 free) and J Kind (0-1 each).	Report	D Harrington (0-4, 1 free), J Harrington (0-2), K Goggin (0-1, 1 free).	Referee: A Long (Argideen Rangers)

18 March 2019 Round 1	Cork Institute of Technology	0-19 - 2-11	Carbery	Brinny
	D Dineen, D O’Sullivan (frees) 0-4 each, J Ryan, D Gore, K O’Hanlon, E Murphy 0-2 each, S Walsh, M Bradley, B Hyland 0-1 each.	Report	B O’Driscoll 2-0, D O’Donovan 0-4 (frees), C Cullinane 0-3 (frees), K Keohane, C O’Driscoll 0-2 each.	Referee: C Dineen Douglas

28 March 2019 Round 1	University College Cork	2-18 - 0-11	Muskerry	Páirc Uí Rinn, Cork
	E Courtney (4f) 0-8, E Finnerty 1-1, J Ryan 1-0, L O’Sullivan (1f) 0-3, L Wall 0-2, E O’Brien, R Buckley, L Grainger, D Cleary 0-1 each.	Report	M Healy (3f) 0-4, P Kelleher 1-1, E O’Sullivan, J Moynihan 0-2 each, E O’Sullivan, D O’Connell 0-1 each.	Referee: E Sheehy (Newcestown)

28 March 2019 Round 2	Cork Institute of Technology	2-11 - 1-18	Duhallow	Páirc Uí Rinn, Cork
	D Gore 1-2, D O'Sullivan 0-4, E Murphy 1-0, T Sheehy 0-1, J Ryan 0-1, K O'Hanlon 0-1, B Hyland 0-1, S Walsh 0-1.		D O'Connor 0-6, E McSweeney 0-6, A O'Connor 1-1, P Walsh 0-2, J O'Connor 0-2, L O'Neill 0-1.	Referee: J Ryan (Macroom)

6 May 2019 Round 2	Seandún	2-08 - 2-14	University College Cork	Ballinlough
	G Kelleher (1-3), G Gould (1-0), J P Murphy (0-3, 0-2 frees), D O’Regan and E Buckley (0-1 each).	Report	D Cleary (1-6, 0-2 frees), E Finnerty (0-4), R Forde (1-0), M Kelleher (0-2), G Murphy and P Lucey (0-1 each).	Referee: J Ryan (Macroom)

=== Preliminary round ===
6 April 2019 Preliminary round	Carrigaline	1-08 - 2-12	O'Donovan Rossa	Cloughduv
	B Pope 0-4, M Brosnan 0-3 (0-1 f, 0-1 45), B Ryan 1-0, A Coughlan 0-1.	Report	K Davis 0-7 (0-2 f, 0-2 45), T Hegarty 1-2, M Collins, 1-0, D Hourihane, D Og Hodnett and E Connolly 0-1 each.	Referee: J Ryan (Macroom)

=== Round 1 ===
5 April 2019 Round 1	Mallow	0-10 - 2-12	Kiskeam	O'Connell Park, Glantane
	K O'Connor 0-3, C O'Riordan 0-3 (1f), J Loughrey 0-1, R Harkin 0-1; M Taylor 0-1, P Herlihy 0-1.	Report	S O'Sullivan 1-5 (5f), M Herlihy 1-0, T O'Sullivan 0-3 (1f, 1.45), A Carroll 0-1, D Fitzgerald 0-1, S Meehan 0-1, AJ O'Connor.	Referee: J Bermingham (Bride Rovers)

6 April 2019 Round 1	Clyda Rovers	0-06 - 3-12	St. Finbarr's	Páirc Uí Rinn, Cork
	C Flanagan (0-3, 2 frees), R Flanagan (0-2, 1 free), P Cronin (0-1).	Report	S Sherlock (0-7, 4 frees), E McGreevy, C Keane and A O’Connor (1-0 each), C Lyons, I Maguire, C Dennehy, E Comyns, D O’Brien (0-1 each).	Referee: B Coniry (Crosshaven)

6 April 2019 Round 1	Newcestown	0-09 - 2-09	Clonakilty	Sam Maguire Park, Dunmanway
	D Twomey 0-5 f, C Keane, T Twomey, C Dineen, D Buckley 0-1 each.	Report	S White, T Anglin 1-1 each, J O’Mahony 0-3 (0-2 f), S McEvoy, D Murphy, R Mannix, L O’Donovan 0-1 each.	Referee: D Murnane (Macroom)

6 April 2019 Round 1	Valley Rovers	1-06 - 3-14	Nemo Rangers	Páirc Uí Rinn, Cork
	D O’Sullivan (1-0), J Cottrell (frees) and E Delaney (1 free) (0-2 each), A Walsh and D Lynch (0-1 each).	Report	B O’Driscoll (1-5 (1 free, 1 45), K O’Donovan (1-1), C Horgan (1-0), P Kerrigan (0-3, frees), S Martin and M Cronin (0-2 each), A Cronin (0-1).	Referee: C Lane (Banteer)

7 April 2019 Round 1	Dohenys	4-15 - 0-05	St. Nicholas'	Brinny
	M Buckley 2-7 (0-6 f), F Herlihy 1-3, S Daly 1-0, J Carroll 0-2, J Kelly, B McCarthy, K White 0-1.	Report	E Kearney, L Coughlan (f) 0-2 each, D Morris 0-1 each.	Referee: P O'Driscoll (Bride Rovers)

7 April 2019 Round 1	Castlehaven	0-11 - 1-09	Fermoy	Brinny
	M Collins 0-7 (four frees), C Maguire 0-2, P Hurley (free), M Hurley 0-1 each.	Report	K Morrison 1-1, T Clancy, M Brennan 0-2 each, L Coleman (45), D O’Flynn, P de Róiste (free), R O’Hagan (free) 0-1 each.	Referee: C Dineen (Douglas)

7 April 2019 Round 1	Bishopstown	1-09 - 1-10	Douglas	Páirc Uí Rinn, Cork
	B O’Callaghan (1-0), K O’Halloran (0-3, 0-2 frees, 0-1 ’45), R Cahill (0-2, 0-1 free), D O’Connor (free), D Sexton, S Oakes and E Byrne (0-1 each).	Report	S McCarthy (1-1), C Russell (0-4, 0-3 frees), D Hanrahan, S Collins (free), E O’Sullivan, D Kelly and S Powter (0-1).	Referee: A Long (Argideen Rangers)

14 April 2019 Round 1	Carbery Rangers	1-09 - 2-09	Ilen Rovers	Castlehaven
	D Hayes 1-1, J O’Rourke 0-4, J Hayes 0-3 (f), M Hodnett 0-1 (f).	Report	D Mac Eoin 0-6 (0-2 f), S O’Donovan, T Bushe 1-0 each, Peter O’Driscoll, C O’Driscoll, J Hickey 0-1 each.	Referee: M Collins (Clonakilty)

5 May 2019 Round 1	Ballincollig	0-10 - 0-12	O'Donovan Rossa	Ballinascarthy
	D Murphy 0-5, C Kiely 0-2, C Dorgan (f), S Kiely and K Browne 0-1 each.	Report	K Davis 0-5 f, D Óg Hodnett (f), M Collins and E Connolly 0-2 each and T Hegarty 0-1.	Referee: P O'Driscoll (Bride Rovers)

=== Round 2 ===
11 August 2019 Round 2	Carrigaline	2-09 - 1-09	Bishopstown	Páirc Uí Rinn, Cork
	J McCarthy 1-2, B Kelleher 1-2, Kieran Kavanagh 0-2, M Brosnan 0-1, K McIntyre 0-1, B Pope 0-1.		B Clifford 1-4, S Lordan 0-1, P O'Flynn 0-1, P Cronin 0-1, D O'Connor 0-1, M Power 0-1.	Referee: D Murnane (Macroom)

17 August 2019 Round 2	Castlehaven	1-18 - 2-17 (aet)	Carbery Rangers	Rossa Park, Skibbereen
	M Collins 0-8, B Hurley 0-4, R Walsh 1-0, M Hurley 0-3, C Maguire 0-2, D Cahalane 0-1.		J Hayes 1-9, R Hegarty 1-0, J O'Rourke 0-3, B Shanahan 0-3, R Kiely 0-1, A Jennings 0-1.	Referee: C Lane (Banteer)

31 August 2019 Round 2	Clyda Rovers	0-06 - 5-15	Ballincollig	Blarney
	C Flanagan (f), C O’Sullivan 0-2 each, R Flanagan, D Buckley 0-1 each.	Report	D Murphy 2-4, JP Murphy, C Kiely, G Comerford 1-1 each, C Dorgan 0-3 (0-1 free, 0-1 45), K Browne and S Kiely (0-1 f) 0-2 each, R Noonan 0-1.	Referee: E Sheehy (Newcestown)

31 August 2019 Round 2	Mallow	3-13 - 1-06	St. Nicholas'	O'Connell Park, Glantane
	M O’Rourke 0-5 (0-1 f); R Harkin (pen), E Stanton, R Willis 1-0 each; K O’Sullivan, J Dillon 0-2 each, S McDonnell, K Sheehan, S Merritt, P Herlihy 0-1 each.	Report	G Kennefick 1-1; L Coughlan 0-3 f; D Brosnan, R Byrne 0-1 each.	Referee: P O'Driscoll (Bride Rovers)

31 August 2019 Round 2	Newcestown	1-13 - 0-14	Valley Rovers	Charlie Hurley Park, Bandon
	T Twomey 1-4, C Dinneen 0-4 f, M Kelly 0-2, D Buckley, J Meade, D Twomey 0-1 each.	Report	F Lynch 0-6 f, E Delaney 0-3, J Cottrell (0-1 f), J Walsh 0-2 each, D Lordan 0-1 each.	Referee: J Bermingham (Bride Rovers)

=== Round 3 ===
11 August 2019 Round 3	Douglas	2-16 - 1-14	University College Cork	Páirc Uí Rinn, Cork
	C Russell 0-5, J Holland 1-1, E O'Sullivan 0-4, S Wilson 1-0, S Collins 0-2, S Kingston 0-2, B Hartnett 0-1, S McCarthy 0-1.		G Murphy 0-5, E Courtney 0-4, R Buckley 1-0, P de Brún 0-2, J Naughton 0-1, D Cleary 0-1, A McGrath 0-1.	Referee: J Ryan (Macroom)

17 August 2019 Round 2	Dohenys	1-09 - 1-14	Nemo Rangers	Brinny
	F Herlihy 1-4, J O'Connell 0-2, S Daly 0-2, K White 0-1.		P Kerrigan 1-4, C Horgan 0-4, B O'Driscoll 0-2, C O'Brien 0-2, L Connolly 0-2.	Referee: J Ryan (Macroom)

18 August 2019 Round 3	Duhallow	2-15 - 0-07	Carrigaline	O'Connell Park, Glantane
	S Hickey 1-2, P Walsh 1-1, F O'Connor 0-4, I Walsh 0-2, A O'Connor 0-2, E McSweeney 0-1, D O'Connell 0-1, JF Daly 0-1, M Mahoney 0-1.		B Kelleher 0-4, K Dwane 0-1, K McIntyre 0-1, C Murphy 0-1.	Referee: P O'Leary (Kilmurry)

24 August 2019 Round 3	O'Donovan Rossa	1-19 - 3-14	Clonakilty	Castlehaven
	K Davis 0-12, E Connolly 1-0, D Hourihane 0-3, R Byrne 0-3, K Hurley 0-1.		R Mannix 1-3, D O'Regan 1-2, J O'Mahony 0-4, M Scally 1-0, T Anglin 0-3, S McEvoy 0-1, B Ridgeway 0-1.	Referee: J Ryan (Macroom)

25 August 2019 Round 3	Carbery Rangers	1-17 - 2-17	St. Finbarr's	Charlie Hurley Park, Bandon
	John Hayes 1-8, J O'Rourke 0-3, Darragh Hayes 0-2, B Shanahan 0-2, S Hayes 0-1, James O'Rourke 0-1, K McMahon 0-1.		S Sherlock 1-11, O Murphy 1-0, I Maguire 0-1, E Finn 0-1, C Keane 0-1, C Barrett 0-1, R O'Mahony 0-1, M Shields 0-1.	Referee: D Murnane (Macroom)

31 August 2019 Round 3	Fermoy	1-09 - 1-10	Ilen Rovers	Brinny
	P de Róiste 0-4, R O’Callaghan 1-1 (0-1 f), D Dawson 0-2, T Clancy, B O’Sullivan 0-1 each.	Report	S O’Donovan 1-6 (0-4 f), D Mac Eoin 0-3 (0-2 f, 0-1 45), K O’Sullivan 0-1.	Referee: C Dineen (Douglas)

7 September 2019 Round 3	Kiskeam	1-09 - 0-17	Ballincollig	Dr. Croke Park, Ballyclough
	S O’Sullivan 0-4 (0-1 f); M Herlihy 1-0; G Casey 0-2 (0-1 f); AJ O’Connor, A Carroll, M Casey 0-1 each.	Report	C Dorgan 0-9 (0-2 f); D Murphy 0-5; G Comerford 0-2 (0-1 f); S Kiely 0-1.	Referee: J Bermingham (Bride Rovers)

7 September 2019 Round 3	Newcestown	0-15 - 0-14	Mallow	Coachford
	D Buckley, D Twomey (0-3 f) 0-4 each, L Meade, J Meade 0-2 each, C Dinneen, C Keane, M Kelly 0-1 each.	Report	C O’Riordan 0-7 (0-4 f), R Harkin 0-4 (0-1 f), M O’Rourke (f), S McDonnell, M Taylor 0-1 each.	Referee: J Ryan (Macroom)

=== Quarter-finals ===
21 September 2019 Quarter-final	Newcestown	0-10 - 0-04	Ilen Rovers	Rosscarbery
	D Buckley 0-4, D Twomey 0-2 (frees), L Meade, C Dinneen, C Keane, M Kelly 0-1 each.	Report	S O’Donovan 0-2 (frees), S Leonard, D Mac Eoin (free) 0-1 each.	Referee: A Long (Argideen Rangers)

22 September 2019 Quarter-final	Ballincollig	0-09 - 1-12	Douglas	Páirc Uí Rinn, Cork
	C Dorgan 0-4 (0-2 f), D Murphy 0-3, G Comerford, JP Murphy 0-1 each	Report	C Russell 1-3 (0-1 f), S Kingston 0-3 (0-1 f), B Hartnett, N Hartnett 0-2 each, S Powter, J Holland 0-1 each.	Referee: P O'Driscoll (Bride Rovers)

28 September 2019 Quarter-final	Duhallow	2-15 - 0-12	Clonakilty	Páirc Uí Rinn, Cork
	A O’Connor (1-2, 0-1 free), A Walsh (1-1), I Walsh (0-3), F O’Connor and E McSweeney (0-2 each), P Walsh, D O’Connell, S Hickey, D O’Connor (free) and C O’Callaghan (0-1 each).	Report	R Mannix (0-6, 0-5 frees), D O’Regan (0-3), T Anglin, S White and G Barry (0-1 each)	Referee: D Murnane (Macroom)

28 September 2019 Quarter-final	St. Finbarr's	0-08 - 1-12	Nemo Rangers	Páirc Uí Rinn, Cork
	S Sherlock 0-4 (0-1 f), C Keane 0-2, I Maguire, A Murphy 0-1 each.	Report	L Connolly 0-5 (0-2 f, 0-1 45), J Horgan 1-0, M Cronin 0-3, P Kerrigan 0-2, C Horgan 0-2.	Referee: C Lane (Banteer)

=== Semi-finals ===
13 October 2019 Semi-final	Newcestown	0-07 - 0-12	Duhallow	Páirc Uí Rinn, Cork
	D Twomey 0-3 (0-2 f), T Twomey 0-2, L Meade 0-1.	Report	A O’Connor 0-4 (0-3 f), F O’Connor 0-2, K Crowley, E McSweeney, C O’Callaghan, S Hickey, D O’Connor, I Walsh 0-1 each.	Referee: J Bermingham (Bride Rovers)

13 October 2019 Semi-final	Douglas	0-07 - 3-12	Nemo Rangers	Páirc Uí Rinn, Cork
	J Holland 0-3 (0-2 frees), S Kingston 0-2, S Powter, C Russell 0-1 each.	Report	P Kerrigan 2-1, L Connolly 0-4 (0-2 f, 0-1 45), M Cronin 0-3 (0-2 f), A O’Donovan 1-0, K O’Donovan 0-2, B Murphy, J Horgan 0-1 each.	Referee: J Ryan (Macroom)

=== Final ===
27 October 2019 Final	Duhallow	0-10 - 2-08	Nemo Rangers	Páirc Uí Rinn, Cork
	A O’Connor (0-1 free), D O’Connor, E McSweeney (0-2 each); K Cremin, K Crowley, I Walsh, F O’Connor (0-1 each).	Report	L Connolly (2-4, 0-3 frees); M Cronin (0-2); C O’Brien, P Kerrigan (0-1 each).	Referee: J Ryan (Macroom)

== Championship statistics ==
=== Top scorers ===
Top scorers overall

Rank	Player	Club	Tally	Total	Matches	Average
1	John Hayes	Carbery Rangers	2-20	26	3	8.66
2	Steven Sherlock	St. Finbarr's	1-22	25	3	8.33
3	Kevin Davis	O'Donovan Rossa	0-24	24	3	8.00
4	Luke Connolly	Nemo Rangers	2-15	21	4	5.25
5	Paul Kerrigan	Nemo Rangers	3-11	20	5	4.00
5	Darren Murphy	Ballincollig	2-14	20	3	6.66
6	Anthony O'Connor	Duhallow	2-13	19	6	3.16
7	Cian Dorgan	Ballincollig	0-17	17	4	4.25
7	Donncha O'Connor	Duhallow	0-17	17	5	3.20
8	Conor Russell	Douglas	1-13	16	4	4.00
8	Eoghan McSweeney	Duhallow	0-16	16	6	2.66

Top scorers in a single game

Rank	Player	Club	Tally	Total	Opposition
1	Steven Sherlock	St. Finbarr's	1-11	14	Carbery Rangers
2	Mark Buckley	Dohenys	2-07	13	St. Nicholas'
3	John Hayes	Carbery Rangers	1-09	12	Castlehaven
3	Kevin Davis	O'Donovan Rossa	0-12	12	Clonakilty
4	John Hayes	Carbery Rangers	1-08	11	St. Finbarr's
5	Darren Murphy	Ballincollig	2-04	10	Clyda Rovers
5	Luke Connolly	Nemo Rangers	2-04	10	Duhallow
6	Daire Cleary	UCC	1-06	9	Seandún
6	Seán O'Donovan	Ilen Rovers	1-06	9	Fermoy
6	Cian Dorgan	Ballincollig	0-09	9	Kiskeam
