= 2018 Cork Intermediate Hurling Championship =

Irish hurling competition

- Dates: 21 April 2018 - October 2018
- Teams: 27
- Sponsor: Evening Echo
- Champions: Ballincollig (8th title); Ciarán O'Sullivan (captain); Danny Dwyer (manager)
- Runners-up: Blackrock; Eoin O'Farrell (captain)

Tournament statistics
- Matches played: 44
- Goals scored: 124 (2.82 per match)
- Points scored: 1315 (29.89 per match)
- Top scorer(s): Cian Dorgan (0-57)

The 2018 Cork Intermediate Hurling Championship was the 109th staging of the Cork Intermediate Hurling Championship since its establishment by the Cork County Board in 1909. The draw for the opening round fixtures took place on 10 December 2017. The championship began on 21 April 2018 and ended on 14 October 2018.

On 14 October 2018, Ballincollig won the championship after a 2-16 to 1-15 defeat of Blackrock in the final at Páirc Uí Chaoimh. It was their eighth championship title overall and their first title since 1999.

Ballincollig's Cian Dorgan was the championship's top scorer with 0-57.

== Team changes ==
=== To Championship ===
Promoted from the Cork Junior A Hurling Championship

- St. Catherine's

=== From Championship ===
Promoted to the Cork Premier Intermediate Hurling Championship

- Aghada

== Results ==
=== Preliminary round ===
29 April 2018 Preliminary round	Douglas	1-10 - 1-13	Dungourney	Ovens
	D O'Mahony 1-4, J Holland 0-2, M O'Callaghan 0-2, C Sheehan 0-1, J Moylan 0-1.		R Denny 0-8, D Aherne 1-0, S Hegarty 0-3, B Aherne 0-1, E Aherne 0-1.	Referee: C Egan (Glen Rovers)

=== Round 1 ===
21 April 2018 Round 1	Argideen Rangers	2-09 - 3-17	Castlemartyr	Ovens
	JM O'Callaghan 0-5, B Hennessy 1-1, P Butler 1-0, C O'Donovan 0-3.		M Kelly 0-8, Brian Lawton 1-4, J Stack 1-2, L Martin 1-0, Barry Lawton 0-3.	Referee: D Daly (Brian Dillons)

29 April 2018 Round 1	Grenagh	0-15 - 1-17	St. Catherine's	Mill Field
	S Cronin 0-4, S Bourke 0-3, A O'Neill 0-3, P Barry-Murphy 0-1, T Kenny 0-1, A Duggan 0-1, P McSweeney 0-1, K Cummins 0-1.		S O'Brien 0-7, D Mangan 1-3, B Mulcahy 0-2, P Keane 0-2, C Hegarty 0-1, B O'Brien 0-1, C Kearney 0-1.	Referee: D Farrell Jnr (Mitchelstown)

10 May 2018 Round 1	Éire Óg	0-14 - 1-12	Sarsfields	Páirc Uí Rinn
	K Hallissey 0-9, J Cooper 0-2, E O'Shea 0-2, P McDonagh 0-1.		D Walsh 0-7, R Murphy 1-0, R Ryan 0-1, J Flannery 0-1, T Crowley 0-1, A Hackett 0-1, C Murphy 0-1.	Referee: D Daly (Brian Dillons)

11 May 2018 Round 1	Ballygarvan	1-12 - 1-18	Aghabullogue	Ovens
	M Kennefick 1-5, M Cussen 0-3, G White 0-2, D O'Sullivan 0-1, D O'Connor 0-1.		S Tarrant 0-8, I Barry-Murphy 1-2, P Finnegan 0-5, N Buckley 0-1, M Bradley 0-1, J Corkery 0-1.	Referee: S Crowley (Argideen Rangers)

12 May 2018 Round 1	Inniscarra	0-11 - 2-22	Ballymartle	Páirc Liam Mhic Cárthaigh
	A O'Mahony 0-7, M O'Connell 0-3, A O'Connell 0-1.		D O'Leary 0-6, D Dwyer 1-2, A Daly 0-5, K McCarthy 1-1, J Dwyer 0-3, S Cummins 0-2, J Ryan 0-2, S Dorney 0-1.	Referee: M O'Mahony (Kilbrittain)

12 May 2018 Round 1	Ballinhassig	1-06 - 2-21	Glen Rovers	Ballincollig
	C O'Mahony 1-0, P Coomey 0-2, B Lombard 0-1, G Collins 0-1, S Dineen 0-1, G Sheehan 0-1.		P Virgo 1-5, B Hackett 0-8, C O'Brien 1-2, D Busteed 0-3, L Coughlan 0-2, K McCarthy 0-1.	Referee: A Larkin (Shamrocks)

12 May 2018 Round 1	St. Finbarr's	2-09 - 1-16	Mayfield	Páirc Uí Rinn
	M Ryan 2-2, B Beckett 0-4, K Hodgins 0-2, D Quinn 0-1.		N Kelly 0-6, S Duggan 1-0, K Punch 0-3, R O'Keeffe 0-2, S Kelly 0-2, D O'Neill 0-1, P Duggan 0-1, K Walsh 0-1.

12 May 2018 Round 1	Midleton	2-15 - 1-12	Blackrock	Páirc Uí Rinn
	G Manley 0-6, M Abernethy 1-0, P Dowling 1-0, P O'Keeffe 0-3, J Hegarty 0-2, I Kennefick 0-1, R O'Regan 0-1, E Walsh 0-1, E Moloney 0-1.		E O'Farrell 0-6, L Fogarty 0-4, R Dineen 1-0, L O'Sullivan 0-2.	Referee: D O'Farrell Jnr (Mitchelstown)

13 May 2018 Round 1	Ballincollig	2-16 - 1-21	Meelin	Banteer
	C Kinsella 2-1, D Bowne 0-7, S Walsh 0-3, I Coughlan 0-2, J Murray 0-1, L Fahy 0-1, P O'Neill 0-1.		E Brosnan 1-14, DJ O'Sullivan 0-3, J O'Callaghan 0-2, J Curtin 0-1, S Hehir 0-1.	Referee: C O'Regan (Ballyhea)

13 May 2018 Round 1	Na Piarsaigh	1-11 - 1-13	Barryroe	Ovens
	E McCarthy 0-4, D McGuire 1-0, C Hanifin 0-3, R Lynch 0-2, K Waters 0-1, P Lynch 0-1.		J Murphy 0-5, L Donovan 1-0, C Hurley 0-3, D O'Sullivan 0-2, P Moloney 0-1, D O'Driscoll 0-1, D Murphy 0-1.	Referee: G Scully (Killeagh)

13 May 2018 Round 1	Tracton	1-18 - 3-09	Kilbrittain	Páirc Uí Ríogáin
	R Walsh 0-8, M O'Sullivan 1-3, J Kingston 0-3, S O'Sullivan 0-2, C McGuinness 0-1, D O'Flaherty 0-1.		R Cashman 2-1, M Sexton 1-3, D Harrington 0-3, P Wall 0-2.	Referee: C Lyons (Nemo Rangers)

13 May 2018 Round 1	Kildorrery	1-22 - 2-14	Dripsey	Mallow GAA Complex
	P O'Brien 0-9, E O'Connor 1-1, J O'Sullivan 0-3, S O'Neill 0-2, J McEniry 0-2, J O'Gorman 0-1, F Stapleton 0-1, D Kent 0-1, R McEniry 0-1, C Harrington 0-1.		M O'Riordan 1-7, E Maher 1-4, D O'Sullivan 0-1, M O'Sullivan 0-1, J Carey 0-1.	Referee: M Murphy (Bride Rovers)

19 May 2018 Round 1	Dungourney	2-22 - 1-21 (aet)	Milford	Mill Field
	R Denny 0-10, Brian Aherne 1-1, S Hegarty 1-0, S Hegarty 0-3, D Aherne 0-2, J McCarthy 0-2, Bill Aherne 0-2, D Healy 0-1, N Motherway 0-1.		H O'Gorman 0-11, E Dillon 1-2, A Watson 0-3, P Sheehy 0-3, S Whelan 0-1, D Hayes-Daly 0-1.	Referee: D Farrell Jnr (Mitchelstown)

=== Round 2 ===
6 July 2018 Round 2	Ballinhassig	0-19 - 4-18	Blackrock	Páirc Uí Rinn
	G Collins 0-11, C McCarthy 0-1, S O'Neill 0-1, P Coomey 0-1, S Dineen 0-1, C O'Mahony 0-1, S Sheehan 0-1, M Coleman 0-1, J Grainger 0-1.		M O'Halloran 2-9, E O'Farrell 1-2, L O'Sullivan 1-1, Ciaran Cormack 0-3, L Fogarty 0-2, R Dineen 0-1.

7 July 2018 Round 2	Dripsey	0-12 - 1-16	Na Piarsaigh	Páirc Uí Rinn
	M O'Riordan 0-8, D O'Riordan 0-2, E Maher 0-1, J Carey 0-1.		K Waters 1-2, R Lynch 0-5, D Morrissey 0-2, D Maguire 0-1, A Higgins 0-1, E McCarthy 0-1, E Galvin 0-1, D Bowen 0-1, L Murphy 0-1, A Hogan 0-1.

7 July 2018 Round 2	Grenagh	1-17 - 0-15	St. Finbarr's	Páirc Uí Rinn
	S Cronin 0-8, A O'Neill 1-0, T Kenny 0-3, G Russell 0-2, P Barry-Murphy 0-1, C O'Neill 0-1, K Cummins 0-1, M O'Riordan 0-1.		B O'Connell 0-7, M Ryan 0-2, E Dennehy 0-2, K Hodgins 0-1, C Buckley 0-1, E Mulcahy 0-1, P O'Brien 0-1.

13 July 2018 Round 2	Douglas	2-13 - 1-08	Inniscarra	Ballincollig
	F Desmond 0-4, B O'Connor 1-0, C O'Brien 1-0, C Baldwin 0-3, E Dolan 0-2, M Harrington 0-2, M O'Callaghan 0-1, J Holland 0-1.		S Dornan 1-1, T O'Connor 0-3, A O'Mahony 0-2, C Bennett 0-1, J Harrington 0-1.

13 July 2018 Round 2	Ballygarvan	0-16 - 2-15	Kilbrittain	Charlie Hurley Park
		M Sexton 1-8, P Wall 1-1, R Cashman 0-4, D Harrington 0-2.	M Cussen 0-8, D McCarthy 0-2, M Kennefick 0-2, G White 0-2, D O'Sullivan 0-1, R O'Leary 0-1.

14 July 2018 Round 2	Ballincollig	1-21 - 1-07	Milford	Kanturk
	C Dorgan 0-7, S Walsh 0-7, D Bowen 1-1, I Coughlan 0-3, R O'Doherty 0-2, K Walsh 0-1.		H O'Gorman 0-4, E Dillon 1-0, B Ó Murchú 0-2, K O'Gorman 0-1.

22 July 2018 Round 2	Argideen Rangers	1-10 - 0-19	Éire Óg	Brinny Sportsfield
	JM O'Callaghan 0-8, B Fleming 1-1, E Lawton 0-1.		K Hallissey 0-5, E O'Shea 0-5, P McDonagh 0-4, D Goulding 0-2, R O'Toole 0-2, B Hurley 0-1.

=== Round 3 ===
3 August 2018 Round 3	Na Piarsaigh	1-13 - 1-11	Ballymartle	Ballincollig
	R Lynch 0-5, D McGuire 1-1, K Waters 0-2, A Hogan 0-1, D Morrissey 0-1, C Buckley 0-1, E Galvin 0-1, A Higgins 0-1.		D O'Leary 0-6, A Daly 1-0, D Dwyer 0-2, S Cummins 0-2, A Gould 0-1.

10 August 2018 Round 3	Mayfield	2-19 - 1-17	St. Catherine's	Páirc Mac Gearailt
	S Duggan 1-6, N Kelly 0-8, P Duggan 1-0, S Kelly 0-2, P Condon 0-1, S O'Donovan 0-1, D Malone 0-1.		S O'Brien 0-8, Richard Galvin 1-1, B Mulcahy 0-3, S Cotter 0-1, E Davis 0-1, Rory Galvin 0-1, P Keane 0-1, M Mulcahy 0-1.

11 August 2018 Round 3	Barryroe	1-12 - 1-16	Blackrock	Brinny Sportsfield
	J Murphy 0-8, B O'Donovan 1-1, D O'Driscoll 0-2, J O'Donovan 0-1.		M O'Halloran 1-7, R Dineen 0-3, Cathal Comrack 0-2, G Connolly 0-1, E O'Farrell 0-1, L O'Sullivan 0-1, D Cashman 0-1.

11 August 2018 Round 3	Dungourney	2-18 - 0-18	Tracton	Páirc Uí Rinn
	R Denny 0-7, D Ahern 1-3, Shane Hegarty 0-5, Seán Hegarty 1-0, B Ahern 0-1, M Hennessy 0-1, S Casey 0-1.		R Walsh 0-7, S O'Sullivan 0-3, D O'Flaherty 0-3, C McGuinness 0-1, J Kingston 0-1, J Good 0-1, T McGuinness 0-1, M O'Sullivan 0-1.

11 August 2018 Round 3	Kildorrery	2-14 - 0-15	Sarsfields	Páirc Mac Gearailt
	P O'Brien 1-5, J Keating 1-3, F Stapleton 0-2, E O'Connor 0-2, J O'Sullivan 0-1, A O'Brien 0-1.		E O'Sullivan 0-7, D Walsh 0-3, S Garvey 0-2, R Murphy 0-1, J O'Leary 0-1, K Roche 0-1.

12 August 2018 Round 3	Castlemartyr	4-18 - 2-16	Glen Rovers	Páirc Shéamuis de Barra
	Barry Lawton 2-10, S Hennessy 1-2, L Martin 1-1, Brian Lawton 0-3, J Lawton 0-1, M Kelly 0-1.		B Hackett 0-9, C Dorris 1-1, D Cunningham 1-1, D Cronin 0-2, L Coughlan 0-1, D Busteed 0-1, P Virgo 0-1.

17 August 2018 Round 3	Ballincollig	1-17 - 3-11	Midleton	Ovens
	C Dorgan 0-11, I Coughlan 1-2, D Bowen 0-3, S Walsh 0-1.		G Manley 1-5, I Kennefick 1-0, K Finn 1-0, P Dowling 0-2, K Mulcahy 0-1, K Farmer 0-1, J Hegarty 0-1, R O'Regan 0-1.

18 August 2018 Round 3	Douglas	1-18 - 4-12	Éire Óg	Brinny Sportsfield
	B Turnbull 0-8, C Baldwin 0-4, J Holland 1-0, E Dolan 0-3, M O'Callaghan 0-2, D Ward 0-1.		K Hallissey 1-6, D Goulding 2-0, E O'Shea 1-3, M Brady 0-1, R O'Toole 0-1, P Kirwan 0-1.

24 August 2018 Round 3 replay	Ballincollig	1-18 - 1-10	Midleton	Ovens
	C Dorgan 0-13, R Bourke 1-1, L Fahy 0-2, P O'Neill 0-1, D Bowen 0-1.		G Manley 0-5, R O'Regan 1-1, I Kennefick 0-1, P Dowling 0-1, T O'Connell 0-1, S Finn 0-1.

25 August 2018 Round 3	Aghabullogue	5-12 - 3-14	Grenagh	Páirc Eoin Mhic Charthaigh
	P Finnegan 1-5, M Bradley 1-5, I Barry-Murphy 2-0, D Dineen 1-0, J Corkery 0-1, D Quinlan 0-1.		S Cronin 1-5, T Kenny 2-0, C O'Neill 0-4, U Duggan 0-3, S Bourke 0-2.

25 August 2018 Round 3	Kilbrittain	2-12 - 1-15	Meelin	Mourne Abbey
	M Sexton 1-5, R Cashman 1-3, D Harrington 0-2, T Sheehan 0-1, D Desmond 0-1.		E Brosnan 0-6, James Forrest 1-0, J Curtin 0-2, J O'Callaghan 0-2, M O'Keeffe 0-1, DJ O'Sullivan 0-1, John Forrest 0-1, Shane Hehir 0-1, Jerry Forrest 0-1.

1 September 2018 Round 3 replay	Kilbrittain	5-17 - 0-18	Meelin	Ballincollig
	M Sexton 3-6, P Wall 2-0, R Cashman 0-3, C O'Leary 0-2, D Desmond 0-2, D Harrington 0-1, S Shorten 0-1, P Brennan 0-1, M Madden 0-1.		E Brosnan 0-6, J O'Callaghan 0-4, S Hehir 0-3, J Curtin 0-2, James Forrest 0-2, John Forrest 0-1.

=== Relegation play-offs ===
9 September 2018 Round 1	Dripsey	1-19 - 2-20	Milford	Fr. Kelleher Park
	E Maher 1-4, D O'Riordan 0-4, M O'Riordan 0-4, M O'Sullivan 0-4, D O'Sullivan 0-1, A Murray 0-1, K Kelleher 0-1.		H O'Gorman 1-6, A Watson 1-3, D Hannigan 0-4, E Dillon 0-3, B Murphy 0-2, T O'Flynn 0-1, S Whelan 0-1.

16 September 2018 Round 1	Ballygarvan	1-13 - 1-12	St. Finbarr's	Ovens
	M Kennefick 1-11, M Cussen 0-1, J Fenton 0-1.		B O'Connell 1-4, P Kennedy 0-2, E Hill 0-2, S Calnan 0-2, P O'Brien 0-1, M Ryan 0-1.

29 September 2018 Round 1	Ballinhassig	3-18 - 0-06	Inniscarra	Páirc Liam Mhic Cárthaigh

22 September 2018 Round 2	Argideen Rangers	1-18 - 0-09	Dripsey	Cloughduv
	C O'Donovan 1-2, P Butler 0-5, B Fleming 0-3, D O'Donovan 0-3, J Sheehan 0-1, E Lawton 0-1, M O'Callaghan 0-1, JM O'Callaghan 0-1, B Hennessy 0-1.		M O'Riordan 0-6, David O'Sullivan 0-1, E Maher 0-1, Dean O'Sullivan 0-1.

=== Quarter-finals ===
7 September 2018 Quarter-final	Castlemartyr	0-13 - 1-13	Mayfield	Páirc Shéamuis de Barra
	Barry Lawton 0-7, Brian Lawton 0-3, J Stack 0-2, B Smiddy 0-1.		N Kelly 0-7, D O'Neill 1-0, MJ Coffey 0-2, R O'Keeffe 0-1, G Lehane 0-1, S Kelly 0-1, S Crowley 0-1.	Referee: A Larkin (Shamrocks)

9 September 2018 Quarter-final	Éire Óg	7-21 - 1-11	Na Piarsaigh	Páirc Liam Mhic Cárthaigh
	K Hallissey 3-3, E O'Shea 1-5, D Goulding 1-4, B Hurley 1-1, P McDonagh 1-1, J Cooper 0-3, R O'Toole 0-1, E Kelleher 0-1, M Brady 0-1, D Kirwan 0-1.		R Lynch 0-5, E Galvin 1-1, E Hannifin 0-2, P Lynch 0-1, C Hannifin 0-1, C Allen 0-1.	Referee: M O'Mahony (Kilbrittain)

15 September 2018 Quarter-final	Ballincollig	1-19 - 1-07	Kilbrittain	Charlie Hurley Park
	C Dorgan 0-11, I Coughlan 1-0, F Denny 0-2, R Bourke 0-2, D Bowen 0-1, K Walsh 0-1, C Kinsella 0-1, JP Murphy 0-1.		M Sexton 1-2, R Cashman 0-2, P Wall 0-2, D Harrington 0-1.	Referee: C Egan (Glen Rovers)

23 September 2018 Quarter-final	Blackrock	2-12 - 0-15	Kildorrery	Bride Rovers Park
	L O'Sullivan 1-1, L Fogarty 1-0, E O'Farrell 0-3, P Kennedy 0-2, Ciarán Cormack 0-2, R Dineen 0-2, Cathal Cormack 0-1, C O'Leary 0-1.		J Keating 0-10, J O'Sullivan 0-2, J O'Gorman 0-1, F Stapleton 0-1, E O'Connor 0-1.	Referee: P O'Driscoll (Bride Rovers)

=== Semi-finals ===
28 September 2018 Semi-final	Blackrock	2-20 - 2-18	Éire Óg	Páirc Uí Rinn
	E O'Farrell 0-8, C O'Leary 1-1, R Dineen 1-1, P Kennedy 0-3, R Cantwell 0-2, L O'Sullivan 0-2, Ciarán Cormack 0-2, S O'Keeffe 0-1.		K Hallissey 0-12, B Hurley 1-2, D Goulding 1-1, E O'Shea 0-2, J Cooper 0-1.	Referee: B Murphy (Carrigtwohill)

29 September 2018 Semi-final	Ballincollig	0-20 - 0-17	Mayfield	Páirc Uí Rinn
	C Dorgan 0-7 (2f, 0-1 pen), R Bourke 0-3, S Walsh 0-3, I Coughlan 0-2, K Spillane 0-2; L Fahy 0-2, R O'Doherty 0-1.	Report	N Kelly 0-7 (6f), D O'Neill 0-6; D Malone 0-2, S Kelly 0-1; S Duggan 0-1.	Referee: G Scully (Killeagh/St Ita's)

=== Final ===
14 October 2018 Final	Ballincollig	2-16 - 1-15	Blackrock	Páirc Uí Rinn
	C Dorgan (0-8, 0-6 frees, 0-1 65), L Fahy (1-2), I Coughlan (1-0 pen), R Bourke (0-2), C Sexton (free), D Bowen, R Doherty and S Walsh (0-1 each).	Report	E O’Farrell (0-9, 0-7 frees, 0-1 65m), D Cashman (1-1), L O’Sullivan (0-2), R Cantwell, D Cormack, C Cormack and C O’Leary (0-1 each).	Referee: D O'Farrell (Mitchelstown)

== Championship statistics ==
=== Top scorers ===
Overall

Rank	Player	Club	Tally	Total	Matches	Average
1	Cian Dorgan	Ballincollig	0-57	57	6	9.50
2	Kevin Hallissey	Éire Óg	4-35	47	5	9.40
3	Maurice Sexton	Kilbrittain	7-24	45	5	9.00
4	Eoin O'Farrell	Blackrock	1-29	32	6	5.33
5	Éamonn Brosnan	Meelin	1-26	29	3	9.66
6	Nicky Kelly	Mayfield	0-28	28	4	7.00
7	Michael O'Riordan	Dripsey	1-25	28	4	7.00
8	Barry Lawton	Castlemartyr	2-20	26	3	8.66
9	Michael O'Halloran	Blackrock	3-16	25	2	12.50
9	Ryan Denny	Dungourney	0-25	25	3	8.33

In a single game

Rank	Player	Club	Tally	Total	Opposition
1	Éamonn Brosnan	Meelin	1-14	17	Ballincollig
2	Barry Lawton	Castlemartyr	2-10	16	Glen Rovers
3	Maurice Sexton	Kilbrittain	3-06	15	Meelin
3	Michael O'Halloran	Blackrock	2-09	15	Ballinhassig
4	Mark Kennefick	Ballygarvan	1-11	14	St. Finbarr's
5	Cian Dorgan	Ballincollig	0-13	13	Midleton
6	Kevin Hallissey	Éire Óg	3-03	12	Na Piarsaigh
6	Kevin Hallissey	Éire Óg	0-12	12	Blackrock
7	Maurice Sexton	Kilbrittain	1-08	11	Kilbrittain
7	Henry O'Gorman	Milford	0-11	11	Dungourney
7	Ger Collins	Ballinhassig	0-11	11	Blackrock
7	Cian Dorgan	Ballincollig	0-11	11	Midleton
7	Cian Dorgan	Ballincollig	0-11	11	Kilbrittain
