= Mark Buckley (Gaelic footballer) =

Irish Gaelic footballer

Personal information
- Native name: Marc Ó Buachalla (Irish)
- Born: 1998 (age 27–28) Dunmanway, County Cork, Ireland
- Occupation: Student

Sport
- Sport: Gaelic Football
- Position: Full-forward
Club
| Years | Club | Apps (scores) |
| 2015–present | Dohenys | 11 (5–45) |
Club titles
- Cork titles: 0
College
- Years: College
- Cork Institute of Technology
College titles
- Sigerson titles: 0
Inter-county*
| Years | County | Apps (scores) |
| 2022– | Cork | 0 (0–00) |
Inter-county titles
- Munster titles: 0
- All-Irelands: 0
- NFL: 0
- All Stars: 0
- *Inter County team apps and scores correct as of 18:42, 29 January 2022.

Mark Buckley (born 1998) is an Irish Gaelic footballer who plays at club level with Dohenys and at inter-county level with the Cork senior football team. He usually lines out as a forward.

== Career ==
Buckley first played competitive Gaelic football with the Dohenys club in Dunmanway. After divisional success in the under-21 grade, he eventually progressed onto the club's senior team. Buckley first appeared on the inter-county scene as a member of the Cork minor football team in 2016 before later lining out with the under-20 side. He first appeared on the inter-county scene when he was selected for the Cork senior football team for the pre-season McGrath Cup competition in 2022. Buckley later earned inclusion on the team's National League panel.

== Career statistics ==
=== Club ===
As of match played 28 November 2021.

| Team | Year | Cork SFC | |
| Team | Year | Apps | Score |
|---|---|---|---|
| Dohenys | 2015 | 3 | 0–03 |
| Dohenys | 2016 | 3 | 2–17 |
| Dohenys | 2017 | 4 | 1–18 |
| Dohenys | 2018 | 0 | 0–00 |
| Dohenys | 2019 | 1 | 2–07 |
| Dohenys | Total | 11 | 5–45 |
| Dohenys | Year | Cork SAFC | |
| Dohenys | Year | Apps | Score |
| Dohenys | 2020 | 3 | 1–13 |
| Dohenys | 2021 | 5 | 1–24 |
| Dohenys | Total | 8 | 2–37 |
| Career total | | 19 | 7–82 |

=== Inter-county ===
As of match played 29 January 2022.

| Team | Year | National League | | | Munster | | All-Ireland | | Total | |
| Team | Year | Division | Apps | Score | Apps | Score | Apps | Score | Apps | Score |
|---|---|---|---|---|---|---|---|---|---|---|
| Cork | 2022 | Division 2 | 0 | 0–00 | 0 | 0–00 | 0 | 0–00 | 0 | 0–00 |
| Total | | | 0 | 0–00 | 0 | 0–00 | 0 | 0–00 | 0 | 0–00 |

== Honours ==
Dohenys

- West Cork Under-21A Football Championship: 2017
