= Barry O'Driscoll (Gaelic footballer) =

Irish Gaelic footballer

Personal information
- Native name: Barra Ó Drisceoil (Irish)
- Born: 1990 (age 35–36) Cork, Ireland
- Occupation: Credit analyst

Sport
- Sport: Gaelic football
- Position: Right wing-forward
Club
- Years: Club
- 2007-present: Nemo Rangers
Club titles
- Cork titles: 6
- Munster titles: 4
- All-Ireland Titles: 0
College
- Years: College
- 2008-2012: University College Cork
College titles
- Sigerson titles: 1
Inter-county*
Years	County	Apps (scores)
2011-2017	Cork	11 (1-06)
Inter-county titles
- Munster titles: 1
- All-Irelands: 0
- NFL: 2
- All Stars: 0
- *Inter County team apps and scores correct as of 22:04, 25 April 2020.

Barry O'Driscoll (born 1990) is an Irish Gaelic footballer who plays for club side Nemo Rangers. He is a former member of the Cork senior football team. O'Driscoll usually lines out in the forwards.

== Honours ==
University College Cork

- Sigerson Cup: 2011

Nemo Rangers

- Munster Senior Club Football Championship: 2007, 2010, 2017, 2019 (c)
- Cork Senior Football Championship: 2007, 2008, 2010, 2015, 2017, 2019 (c)

Cork

- Munster Senior Football Championship: 2012
- National Football League: 2011, 2012
- Munster Under-21 Football Championship: 2011
- Munster Minor Football Championship: 2007
