= 2016 Cork Senior Football Championship =

Gaelic football competition

- Dates: 19 April 2016 – 4 December 2016
- Teams: 25
- Sponsor: Evening Echo
- Champions: Carbery Rangers (1st title); James Fitzpatrick (captain); Ronan McCarthy (manager)
- Runners-up: Ballincollig; Ciarán O'Sullivan (captain); Ned English (manager)

Tournament statistics
- Matches played: 48
- Top scorer(s): Cian Dorgan (2-31)

The 2016 Cork Senior Football Championship was the 128th staging of the Cork Senior Football Championship since its establishment by the Cork County Board in 1887. The draw for the opening round fixtures took place on 13 December 2015. The championship began on 19 April 2016 and ended on 4 December 2016.

Nemo Rangers were the defending champions, however, they were defeated by Ballincollig at the semi-final stage.

On 16 October 2016, Carbery Rangers won the championship following a 1-15 to 1-12 defeat of Ballincollig in the final at Páirc Uí Rinn. It remains their only championship title.

Ballincollig's Cian Dorgan was the championship's top scorer with 2-31.

== Team changes ==
=== To Championship ===
Promoted from the Cork Premier Intermediate Football Championship

- Carrigaline

== Results ==
=== Preliminary round ===
1 May 2016 Preliminary round	Avondhu	4-16 - 0-06	Ilen Rovers	Coachford Pitch, Coachford
	R O’Hagan (2 frees), C O’Neill (1-0 penalty, 1 free) 1-3 each; D Pyne, S Beston 0-3 each; S Madigan, P Clancy 1-0 each, T Clancy, J Loughrey, C O’Connell, W Fouhy 0-1 each.	Report	K O’Sullivan, D Mac Eoin 0-2 (2 frees) each; C Harrington, A Holland 0-1 each.	Referee: P O'Leary (Kilmurry)

=== Round 1 ===
19 April 2016 Round 1	University College Cork	1-17 - 3-10	Seandún	Ballinlough
	C Cox (1-10, 5 frees); R Buckley (0-3); A Spillane, J Walsh (0-1), J Kiely (0-2)	Report	M Howard (1-2); D O’Neill (1-1); C Brosnan (1-0); P Condon (0-3, 2 frees); JP Murphy (0-2); D O’Regan, R Downey (0-1 each).	Referee: J O'Leary (Mallow)

23 April 2016 Round 1	Carrigaline	0-13 - 0-05	St. Nicholas'	Páirc Liam Mhic Cárthaigh, Ballygarvan
	B Coakley, D Drake (1 free) 0-4 each; B O’Keeffe 0-3; K Kavanagh, M O’Reilly 0-1 each.	Report	R McCarthy Coade, R Brosnan 0-2 (frees) each; D Busteed 0-1.	Referee: M Collins (Clonakilty)

1 May 2016 Round 1	Carbery Rangers	1-17 - 2-13 (aet)	Clyda Rovers	Carrigadrohid
	J Hayes (1-4, 1-0 penalty, 2 frees); J O’Rourke (0-4); C O’Rourke, B Shanahan (2 45s) (0-3 each); J Fitzpatrick, C O’Donovan, R Kiely (0-1 each)	Report	C O’Sullivan (1-1 penalties), S Ronayne (1-2 each); J Murphy (3 frees), C O’Sullivan (0-3 each); F O’Shea, C Flanagan, D Roche (0-1 each)	Referee: D O'Leray (Kiskeam)

2 May 2016 Round 1	Carbery	2-13 - 1-14	O'Donovan Rossa	Sam Maguire Park, Dunmanway
	R Deane 1-3, M Sugrue 1-3 (0-1f), R O’Sullivan 0-3, C O’Driscoll, B O’Driscoll, K O’Driscoll, C Cullinane 0-1 each.	Report	K Davis 0-8 (0-5f), P Crowley 1-0, D Óg Hodnett 0-2, D Shannon 0-2 (0-1pen), T Hegarty, D Hourihane 0-1 each.	Referee: C Lane (Banteer)

2 May 2016 Round 1	Cork Institute of Technology	1-11 - 0-12	Newcestown	Páirc Uí Rinn, Cork
	P Kelleher 1-2; P Clifford 0-3 (1 45); C Moynihan, D Daly (1 free), K Hegarty 0-2 each.	Report	D Twomey 0-5 (4 frees), T Twomey, M Kelly 0-2 each, C Keane, M O’Brien, C Dineen 0-1 each.	Referee: T O'Donovan (Douglas)

3 May 2016 Round 1	Nemo Rangers	3-14 - 1-10	Duhallow	Páirc Uí Rinn, Cork
	C Dalton 2-2, L Connolly 0-4 (frees), C Horgan 1-1, J Horgan 0-2, K Fulignati, J Donovan, P Kerrigan, M Dorgan, C McWhinney 0-1 each.	Report	D O’Connor 0-6 (3 frees, 1 45), M Vaughan 0-3, G O’Connor 1-0, F O’Connor 0-1.	Referee: J Bermingham (Bride Rovers)

7 May 2016 Round 1	Muskerry	2-13 - 0-08	Aghada	Caherlag Sportsfield, Glounthaune
	D Goulding (1-5, 1 free); K Hallissey (1-1); B Shorten (0-3); L Sheehan (0-2); D Goold (45); M Desmond (0-1 each)	Report	C Fleming (0-4, 3 frees); A Berry (0-2 frees); P O’Neill, S Bennett (0-1 each)	Referee: J Larkin (Douglas)

7 May 2016 Round 1	St. Finbarr's	1-17 - 1-07	Beara	Wolfe Tone Park, Bantry
	S Sherlock (0-11, 7 frees); A Murphy (1-3, 3 frees); D O’Brien (0-2); A Lyne (0-1)	Report	C Lowney (1-2, 2 frees); A O’Sullivan (0-3); G Murphy, S O’Sullivan (0-1 each)	Referee: D Murnane (Macroom)

7 May 2016 Round 1	Douglas	0-14 - 1-06	Dohenys	Brinny Sportsfield, Brinny
	L Dineen (0-6, 5 frees); A Cadogan (0-3), G Griffin (0-2) (frees), K Flahive, M Dolan, C Kingston (0-1 each)	Report	M Buckley (0-5 (1 free, 1 45), B O’Donovan (1-0), J O’Connell (0-1).	Referee: J Bermingham (Bride Rovers)

7 May 2016 Round 1	Bishopstown	3-08 - 0-13	Ballincollig	Páirc Uí Rinn, Cork
	D Crowley (2-0), D O’Donovan (1-4, three frees), E Byrne, S Oakes (free), B Coffey and C Dorman (0-1 each)	Report	C Dorgan (0-8, six frees), S Kiely (0-3), P Kelly (0-2)	Referee: B Coniry (Crosshaven)

7 May 2016 Round 1	Castlehaven	0-14 - 0-13	Clonakilty	Rosscarbery
	M Collins (0-4); B Hurley (0-2 frees), S Nolan, M Hurley (0-2 each); C Cahalane, S Cahalane (0-1 free), Darragh Cahalane, Stephen Hurley (0-1 each).	Report	R Mannix (0-4, 0-3 frees); D Lowney (0-3); S McEvoy, D Murphy (0-2 each); I Falvey (0-1 free), T Clancy (0-1 each).	Referee: K Murphy (Nemo Rangers)

8 May 2016 Round 1	Valley Rovers	2-06 - 0-11	Avondhu	Watergrasshill
	H O’Donovan 1-4 (3 frees, 1 45); E Delaney 1-1; D Lordan 0-1.	Report	R O’Hagan 0-3 (frees); S Beston, C O’Neill 0-2 each; J Loughrey, P Clancy, D Pyne, T Clancy 0-1 each.	Referee: P O'Leray (Kilmurry)

=== Round 2A ===
17 June 2016 Round 2A	Bishopstown	3-09 - 1-13	University College Cork	Páirc Uí Rinn, Cork
	D O'Donovan 2-6, D Crowley 1-1, S Oakes 0-2.		C Cox 0-8, C Murphy 1-1, D Harrington 0-1, A Spillane 0-1, R Buckley 0-1, P Spillane 0-1.	Referee: M Collins (Clonakilty)

18 June 2016 Round 2A	Valley Rovers	0-13 - 0-05	Carrigaline	Páirc Uí Ríogáin, Ballinspittle
	J Cottrell 0-3, D Lynch 0-2, K Canty 0-2, F Lynch 0-2, H O'Donovan 0-1, T O'Brien 0-1, J Walsh 0-1, E Delaney 0-1.		B Coakley 0-2, B O'Keeffe 0-1, K McIntyre 0-1, Kevin Kavanagh 0-1.	Referee: J Ryan (Macroom)

18 June 2016 Round 2A	Carbery Rangers	1-13 - 0-12	Douglas	Sam Maguire Park, Dunmanway
	J Hayes 0-6, K Fitzpatrick 1-1, J Fitzpatrick 0-2, J O'Rourke 0-1, R Kiely 0-1, C O'Rourke 0-1, B Hodnett 0-1.		A Cadogan 0-9, S Kingston 0-2, E O'Sullivan 0-1.	Referee: D Murnane (Macroom)

19 June 2016 Round 2A	St. Finbarr's	1-12 - 1-09	Carbery	Castle Grounds, Macroom
	S Sherlock 0-10, P Harte 1-0, E Dennehy 0-1, I Maguire 0-1.		R Deane 1-2, M Sugrue 0-5, K O'Driscoll 0-2.	Referee: D O'Leray (Kiskeam)

19 June 2019 Round 2A	Castlehaven	4-17 - 3-09	Cork Institute of Technology	Páirc Naomh Eoin, Newcestown
	B Hurley 1-8, S Nolan 2-1, S Cahalane 0-3, Stephen Hurley 0-2, M Collins 0-2, P Hurley 0-1.		P Clifford 2-3, N Duggan 1-0, C Moynihan 0-2, K Hegarty 0-1, B Halbert 0-1, Daniel Daly 0-1, P Kelleher 0-1.	Referee: B Coniry (Crosshaven)

19 June 2016 Round 2A	Nemo Rangers	3-12 - 2-09	Muskerry	Páirc Uí Rinn, Cork
	L Connolly 0-8, P Kerrigan 1-1, A Cronin 1-0, C Horgan 1-0, S Cronin 0-1, J O'Donovan 0-1, C Dalton 0-1.		D Goulding 1-4, R Shorten 1-0, F Goold 0-2, R Buckley 0-1, L O'Connor 0-1, L Sheehan 0-1.	Referee: J Bermingham (Bride Rovers)

=== Round 2B ===
28 May 2016 Round 2B	Ilen Rovers	4-12 - 3-09	Dohenys	Aughaville
	K O'Sullivan 3-6, A Holland 1-0, D Mac Eoin 0-3, C O'Driscoll 0-1, S O'Donovan 0-1, D Bushe 0-1.		M Buckley 2-6, D O'Donovan 1-0, D O'Dwyer 0-1, M Quinn 0-1, N Collins 0-1.	Referee: D Murnane (Macrrom)

18 June 2016 Round 2B	Clonakilty	3-14 - 0-09	St. Nicholas'	Charlie Hurley Park, Bandon
	J Henry 2-1, J O'Mahony 0-6, T Clancy 1-1, R Mannix 0-2, G Murray 0-1, D Murray 0-1, I Falvey 0-1, S White 0-1.		B O'Donovan 0-3, L Coughlan 0-2, R Brosnan 0-2, D Barry 0-1, D Cunningham 0-1.	Referee: J O'Leary (Mallow)

18 June 2019 Round 2B	Newcestown	3-13 - 1-10	Aghada	Páirc Liam Mhic Cárthaigh, Cork
	C Keane 1-3, T Twomey 1-3, L Meade 1-1, D Twomey 0-3, E Kelly 0-1, M Kelly 0-1, J O'Toole 0-1.		P O'Neill 1-2, J Farmer 0-2, A O'Donoghue 0-1, A O'Connell 0-1, A Berry 0-1, J Looney 0-1, S Murphy 0-1, K O'Hanlon 0-1.	Referee: J Larkin (Ballinora)

19 June 2016 Round 2B	Duhallow	3-16 - 0-03	Seandún	Coachford Pitch, Coachford
	J O'Connor 2-4, S Hickey 1-4, M Vaughan 0-5, AJ O'Connor 0-1, M Healy 0-1, M Casey 0-1.		P Condon 0-2, K Buckley 0-1.	Referee: N Wall (Carrigaline)

19 June 2016 Round 2B	Avondhu	1-09 - 1-07	O'Donovan Rossa	Coachford Pitch, Coachford
	S Beston 1-1, C O'Neill 0-2, K O'Hanlon 0-2, M Taylor 0-2, T Clancy 0-1, S Shannon 0-1.		D Shannon 1-3, C McCarthy 0-1, T Hegarty 0-1, D Hourihane 0-1, D Óg Hodnett 0-1.	Referee: J Larkin (Ballinora)

6 August 2016 Round 2B	Ballincollig	4-09 - 0-07	Beara	Wolfe Tone Park, Bantry
	E Reilly 3-1, P Kelly 1-1, N Allen 0-2, C O'Sullivan 0-1, R Noonan 0-1, G Durant 0-1, C Fleming 0-1, D Kierstein 0-1.		A O'Sullivan 0-2, V Lehane 0-2, P O'Neill 0-2, M McCarthy 0-1.	Referee: E Sheehy (Newcestown)

- Clyda Rovers received a bey in this round.

=== Round 3 ===
23 July 2016 Round 3	Ilen Rovers	3-08 - 0-09	Carrigaline	Ahamilla Grounds, Clonakilty
	D Mac Eoin 1-3, K O'Sullivan 1-3, S Leonard 1-0, S O'Donovan 0-1, A Holland 0-1.		P Ronayne 0-2, K Kavanagh 0-1, B O'Keeffe 0-1, B Ryan 0-1, K McIntyre 0-1, D Drake 0-1, M O'Reilly 0-1, B Pope 0-1.	Referee: J Ryan (Macroom)

1 August 2016 Round 3	Avondhu	2-11 - 1-08	Muskerry	Dromtariffe
	C O'Neill 1-4, M Taylor 1-0, M Sheehan 0-2, T Clancy 0-1, D Pyne 0-1, K O'Hanlon 0-1, R Harkin 0-1, P de Róiste 0-1.		D Ó Duinnín 0-4, D Goudling 1-0, D Goold 0-2, K Hallissey 0-2.	Referee: D O'Leray (Kiskeam)

1 August 2016 Round 3	Cork Institute of Technology	1-18 - 1-10	Clonakilty	Brinny Sportsfield, Brinny
	C Vaughan 0-10, P Clifford 1-2, C Moynihan 0-2, J Cronin 0-2, D Meaney 0-1, P Kelleher 0-1.		J O'Mahony 0-4, T Clancy 1-0, S White 0-3, D Murphy 0-1, D Lowney 0-1, J Henry 0-1.	Referee: B Coniry (Crosshaven)

1 August 2016 Round 3	Newcestown	2-13 - 0-12	University College Cork	Brinny Sportsfield, Brinny
	D Twomey 1-4, C Keane 1-3, M Kelly 0-2, T Twomey 0-2, L Meade 0-1, C Dineen 0-1.		J Walsh 0-5, C Hughes 0-3, R Buckley 0-2, P Spillane 0-1, R Cahalane 0-1.	Referee: J Larkin (Ballinora)

14 August 2016 Round 3	Duhallow	4-13 - 0-06	Douglas	Coachford Pitch, Coachford
	M Vaughan 1-2, J O'Connor 1-2, D O'Connor 0-5, A Walsh 1-1, S Hickey 1-0, L O'Neill 0-1, L McLoughlin 0-1, A O'Connor 0-1.		S Kingston 0-4, S Powter 0-1, A Cadogan 0-1.	Referee: M Collins (Clonakilty)

14 August 2016 Round 3	Ballincollig	1-14 - 0-14	Clyda Rovers	Blarney
	P Kelly 0-4, G Durant 1-0, S Lucey 0-3, N Ahern 0-3, S Kiely 0-2, E Reilly 0-1, R Noonan 0-1.		J Murphy 0-3, C Flanagan 0-2, P Kissane 0-2, Conor O'Sullivan 0-2, Cian O'Sullivan 0-2, S Ronyane 0-1, S O'Connell 0-1, C Buckley 0-1.	Referee: J Bermingham (Bride Rovers)

- Carbery received a bye in this round.

=== Relegation Playoffs ===
10 September 2016 Round 1	O'Donovan Rossa	1-14 - 0-11	Clyda Rovers	St. Mary's Park, Enniskean
	D Óg Hodnett 1-5, T Hegarty 0-2, R McCarthy 0-2, D Hourihane 0-1, S Fitzgerald 0-1, M Collins 0-1, E Hodnett 0-1, R Price 0-1.		P Cronin 0-3, C Flanagan 0-3, C O'Sullivan 0-3, K Fitzgerald 0-1, D O'Callaghan 0-1.	Referee: J Ryan (Macroom)

3 October 2016 Round 2	Aghada	2-09 - 0-14	Clyda Rovers	Páirc Liam Mhic Cárthaigh, Ballygarvan
	J O'Shea 1-1, J Looney 1-1, P O'Neill 0-4, A Berry 0-3.		Séamus Ronayne 0-4, P Cronin 0-4, Conor O'Sullivan 0-2, O O'Hanlon 0-1, R Carey 0-1, Cian O'Sullivan 0-1, C Buckley 0-1.	Referee: B Coniry (Crosshaven)

20 October 2016 Round 2	St. Nicholas'	2-08 - 1-11	Dohenys	Ovens
	R Brosnan 1-1, G Callanan 1-0, B O'Donovan 0-3, L Forde 0-1, D Dunlea 0-1, D Brosnan 0-1, D Browne 0-1.		J Carroll 1-1, M Quinn 0-2, P McCarthy 0-1, D O'Donovan 0-1, G McCarthy 0-1, D Rice 0-1, D Dwyer 0-1, E Lavers 0-1, S Daly 0-1, G Crowley 0-1.	Referee: J Ryan (Macroom)

4 December 2016 Round 2	St. Nicholas'	1-07 - 1-10	Dohenys	Ovens
	D Dooling 1-0, D Browne 0-2, R Brosnan 0-2, M Dooley 0-1, A O'Donovan 0-1, A Lynch 0-1.		M Buckley 0-6, D O'Donovan 1-1, M Quinn 0-1, E Lavers 0-1, J Kelly 0-1.	Referee: D Murnane (Macroom)

=== Round 4 ===
13 August 2016 Round 4	Castlehaven	3-11 - 2-11	Ilen Rovers	Aughaville
	S Nolan 2-1, Damien Cahalane 1-0, S Cahalane 0-3, M Hurley 0-2, S Collins 0-1, Darragh Cahalane 0-1, C O'Driscoll 0-1, P Hurley 0-1, D Hurley 0-1.		D Mac Eoin 0-5, C Harrington 1-0, J Bushe 1-0, A Holland 0-2, K O'Sullivan 0-1, P O'Driscoll 0-1, T O'Regan 0-1, T Bushe 0-1.	Referee: J Bermingham (Bride Rovers)

14 August 2016 Round 4	Nemo Rangers	3-11 - 0-08	Carbery	Coachford Pitch, Coachford
	L Connolly 2-2, B O'Driscoll 1-2, K Fulignati 0-2, P Kerrigan 0-2, A O'Reilly 0-1, A O'Donovan 0-1, C Horgan 0-1.		R Deane 0-2, C O'Driscoll 0-2, B O'Driscoll 0-2, M Sugrue 0-1, E Goggin 0-1.	Referee: D Murnane (Macroom)

21 August 2016 Round 4	Ballincollig	1-11 - 2-08	Cork Institute of Technology	Páirc Uí Rinn, Cork
	S Kiely 0-5, G Durant 1-0, J Miskella 0-2, P Kelly 0-2, C O'Sullivan 0-1, R Noonan 0-1.		P Kelleher 2-0, P Clifford 0-3, D Daly 0-2, C Moynihan 0-1, C Jordan 0-1, C Vaughan 0-1.	Referee: K Murphy (Nemo Rangers)

28 August 2016 Round 4	Avondhu	1-21 - 0-14	Newcestown	Watergrasshill
	C O'Neill 0-7, R O'Hagan 0-7, P Clancy 1-0, R Harkin 0-3, P de Róiste 0-1, M Taylor 0-1, M Sheehan 0-1, C O'Connell 0-1.		D Twomey 0-8, M Kelly 0-2, C Keane 0-2, N Murray 0-1, T Twomey 0-1.	Referee: J Bermingham (Bride Rovers)

3 September 2016 Round 4	Duhallow	2-14 - 2-07	Bishopstown	Castle Grounds, Macroom
	D O'Connor 0-6, J O'Connor 1-2, S Hickey 0-4, A O'Connor 1-0, M Healy 0-1, D Scannell 0-1.		D Crowley 2-0, D O'Donovan 0-5, C Dorman 0-1, S Oakes 0-1.	Referee: D Murnane (Macroom)

11 September 2019 Round 4 replay	Ballincollig	1-13 - 0-07	Cokr Institute of Technology	Carrigaline
	C Dorgan 0-6, R Noonan 1-1, I Coughlan 0-2, J Miskella 0-2, P Kelly 0-1, C Kiely 0-1.		P Clifford 0-3, Daniel Daly 0-1, K Murphy 0-1, N Duggan 0-1.	Referee: M Collins (Clonakilty)

- Carbery Rangers, St. Finbarr's and Valley Rovers received byes in this round.

=== Quarter-final ===
3 September 2016 Quarter-final	Nemo Rangers	3-10 - 2-10	St. Finbarr's	Páirc Uí Rinn, Cork
	P Kerrigan 1-2, L Connolly 0-5, C Dalton 1-1, C Horgan 1-0, B O'Driscoll 0-2.		S Sherlock 0-8, R Leahy 1-1, I Maguire 1-0, D O'Brien 0-1.	Referee: M Collins (Clonakilty)

11 September 2016 Quarter-final	Carbery Rangers	1-11 - 0-06	Valley Rovers	Sam Maguire Park, Dunmanway
	J O'Rourke 1-2, J Hayes 0-4, S Hayes 0-2, J Fitzpatrick 0-2, C O'Donovan 0-1.		F Lynch 0-3, K Canty 0-1, J Walsh 0-1, H O'Donovan 0-1.	Referee: C Lane (Banteer)

13 September 2016 Quarter-final	Avondhu	2-15 - 2-09	Duhallow	Mourne Abbey
	C O'Neill 1-5 (0-3f), R O'Hagan 0-4 (0-1f), R Harkin 1-0; M Sheehan 0-3, T Clancy 0-1, J Loughrey 0-1, K O'Hanlon 0-1.	Report	D O'Connor 1-4 (1-0 pen, 0-2f), J O'Connor 0-2 (0-1f), A O'Connor 0-1, M Vaughan 0-1, D Scannell 0-1.	Referee: P O'Leary (Kilmurry)

17 September 2016 Quarter-final	Ballincollig	3-15 - 0-07	Castlehaven	Ahamilla Grounds, Clonakilty
	C Dorgan 1-6, I Coughlan 1-3, S Kiely 1-1, J Miskella 0-4, K Browne 0-1.		S Cahalane 0-3, P Hurley 0-1, S Collins 0-1, C O'Driscoll 0-1, D Cahalane 0-1.	Referee: K Murphy (Nemo Rangers)

=== Semi-final ===
2 October 2016 Semi-final	Carbery Rangers	1-17 - 0-08	Avondhu	Páirc Uí Rinn, Cork
	J Hayes 1-8 (1-0 penalty, 2f), C O'Donovan 0-2, J O'Riordan, K McMahon, S Hayes, J Fitzpatrick, J O'Rourke, A Jennings and M Mennis 0-1 each.	Report	C O'Neill 0-4 (3f, 1'45), R O'Hagan 0-2 (f), J Daly and M Sheehan 0-1 each.	Referee: J Bermingham (Bride Rovers)

2 October 2016 Semi-final	Ballincollig	1-10 - 2-06	Nemo Rangers	Páirc Uí Rinn, Cork
	C Dorgan 0-4, S Kiely 1-0, K Browne 0-2, C O'Sullivan 0-1, J Miskella 0-1, R Noonan 0-1, I Coughlan 0-1.		L Connolly 1-2, P Kerrigan 1-1, M Dorgan 0-1, B O'Driscoll 0-1, A O'Donovan 0-1.	Referee: C Lane (Banteer)

=== Final ===
16 October 2016 Final	Carbery Rangers	1-15 - 1-12	Ballincollig	Páirc Uí Rinn, Cork
	J Hayes (0-2 frees), J O’Rourke 0-5 each, C O’Donovan 1-0, S Hayes 0-2, B Shanahan, J O’Riordan, R Kiely 0-1 each.	Report	C Dorgan 1-7 (0-5 frees, 0-1 45), I Coughlan 0-2 (frees), J Miskella, S Lucey, C Kiely 0-1 each.	Referee: K Murphy (Nemo Rangers)

== Championship statistics ==
=== Top scorers ===
Top scorers overall

Rank	Player	Club	Tally	Total	Matches	Average
1	Cian Dorgan	Ballincollig	2-31	37	5	7.20
2	Colm O'Neill	Avondhu	3-27	36	7	5.14
3	John Hayes	Carbery Rangers	2-27	33	5	6.60
4	Luke Connolly	Nemo Rangers	3-21	30	5	6.00
5	Steven Sherlock	St. Finbarr's	0-29	29	3	9.66
6	Jerry O'Connor	Duhallow	5-10	25	5	5.00
7	Kevin O'Sullivan	Ilen Rovers	4-12	24	4	6.00
7	Daniel O'Donovan	Bishopstown	3-15	24	3	8.00
7	Donncha O'Connor	Duhallow	1-21	24	4	6.00
8	Pádraig Clifford	CIT	3-14	23	5	4.60
8	Mark Buckley	Dohenys	2-17	23	3	7.66
8	Dan Twomey	Newcestown	1-20	23	4	5.75

Top scorers in a single game

Rank	Player	Club	Tally	Total	Opposition
1	Kevin O'Sullivan	Ilen Rovers	3-06	15	Dohenys
2	Conor Cox	UCC	1-10	13	Seandún
3	Mark Buckley	Dohenys	2-06	12	Ilen Rovers
3	Daniel O'Donovan	Bishopstown	2-06	12	UCC
4	Brian Hurley	Castlehaven	1-08	11	CIT
4	John Hayes	Carbery Rangers	1-08	11	CIT
4	Steven Sherlock	St. Finbarr's	0-11	11	Beara
5	Eoin Reilly	Ballincollig	3-01	10	Beara
5	Jerry O'Connor	Duhallow	2-04	10	Seandún
5	Cian Dorgan	Ballincollig	1-07	10	Carbery Rangers
5	Steven Sherlock	St. Finbarr's	0-10	10	Carbery
5	Cathal Vaughan	CIT	0-10	10	Clonakilty

=== Miscellaneous ===
- Carbery Rangers win their first title at the fourth attempt.
- Carbery Rangers and Ballincollig meet in the final for the second time in three seasons.
- Carrigaline make their first appearance at senior level.
