= 2017 Cork Senior Football Championship =

Gaelic football competition

- Dates: 9 April 2017 – 22 October 2017
- Teams: 26
- Sponsor: Evening Echo
- Champions: Nemo Rangers (20th title); Aidan O'Reilly (captain); Larry Kavanagh (manager)
- Runners-up: St. Finbarr's; Ian Maguire (captain); Ray Keane (manager)

Tournament statistics
- Matches played: 50
- Goals scored: 121 (2.42 per match)
- Points scored: 1207 (24.14 per match)
- Top scorer(s): Steven Sherlock (2-48)

The 2017 Cork Senior Football Championship was the 129th staging of the Cork Senior Football Championship since its establishment by the Cork County Board in 1887. The draw for the 2017 fixtures took place on 11 December 2016. The championship began on 9 April 2017 and ended on 22 October 2017.

Carbery Rangers were the defending champions, however, they were defeated by St. Finbarr's at the semi-final stage.

On 22 October 2017, Nemo Rangers won the championship after a 4-12 to 3-13 defeat of St. Finbarr's in a final replay at Páirc Uí Chaoimh. This was their 20th championship title overall and their first title since 2015.

Steven Sherlock of the St. Finbarr's club was the championship's top scorer with 2-48.

== Team changes ==
=== To Championship ===
Promoted from the Cork Intermediate Football Championship

- Kiskeam

== Results ==
=== Preliminary round ===
9 April 2017 Preliminary round	Douglas	0-14 - 0-09	Newcestown	Brinny Sportsfield, Brinny
	K Conlon 0-5, A Cadogan 0-4, L Dineen 0-2, M Dolan 0-1, S Powter 0-1, N Walsh 0-1.		D Twomey 0-5, M Kelly 0-3, T Twomey 0-1.	Referee: D Murnane (Macroom)

15 April 2017 Preliminary round	Aghada	0-13 - 1-08	Dohenys	Ovens
	C Fleming 0-7, P O'Neill 0-3, W Leahy 0-1, M O'Connor 0-1, K O'Shea 0-1.	Report	M Buckley 1-6, M Quinn 0-2.	Referee: K Murphy (Nemo Rangers)

=== Round 1 ===
16 April 2017 Round 1	Avondhu	3-20 - 2-11	Kiskeam	Banteer Sportsfield, Banteer
	C O'Neill 1-7, S Walsh 1-1, P Clancy 1-0, M Sheehan 0-3, R Harkin 0-2, C O'Riordan 0-2, K O'Connor 0-2, T Clancy 0-1, S Beston 0-1, J Daly 0-1.	Report	G Casey 1-3, M Herlihy 1-1, S O'Sullivan 0-3, B Dennehy 0-2, Daniel Fitzgerald 0-2.	Referee: J Bermingham (Bride Rovers)

16 April 2017 Round 1	Valley Rovers	1-14 - 0-07	Beara	Sam Maguire Park, Dunmanway
	F Lynch 1-4, Tadhg O'Brien 0-3, E O'Reilly 0-2, J Walsh 0-2, B Crowley 0-2, J Lyons 0-1.		S O'Sullivan 0-3, G Murphy 0-2, B O'Sullivan 0-1, P O'Neill 0-1.	Referee: M Collins (Clonakilty)

17 April 2017 Round 1	Duhallow	3-20 - 0-09	Muskerry	Kanturk
	M Healy 2-2, Barry O'Connor 0-4, E McSweeney 1-0, D O'Connor 0-3, J O'Connor 0-3, A O'Connor 0-2, S Hickey 0-2, A Walsh 0-1, L O'Neill 0-1, M Vaughan 0-1, P Walsh 0-1.	Report	D Horgan 0-2, J Corkery 0-2, D Goulding 0-1, D O'Connor 0-1, B Cronin 0-1, D Dineen 0-1, C Óg Jones 0-1.	Referee: C Dineen (Douglas)

17 April 2017 Round 1	Castlehaven	1-14 - 0-12	Cork Institute of Technology	Páirc Naomh Eoin, Newcestown
	M Collins 0-8, C O'Driscoll 1-0, S Nolan 0-2, S Cahalane 0-2, C Hayes 0-1, M Hurley 0-1.		M Bradley 0-3, D Culloty 0-2, C O'Keeffe 0-2, K Murphy 0-1, P O'Sullivan 0-1, M O'Reilly 0-1, S O'Sullivan 0-1, M Healy 0-1.	Referee: J Larkin (Ballinora)

22 April 2017 Round 1	Nemo Rangers	2-18 - 0-13	O'Donovan Rossa	Charlie Hurley Park, Bandon
	L Connolly 0-5, P Gumley 1-1, B O'Driscoll 0-4, P Kerrigan 0-4, J Horgan 1-0, K Fulignati 0-2, S Cronin 0-1, A O'Donovan 0-1.		K Davis 0-8, D Óg Hodnett 0-2, D Hazel 0-1, R Price 0-1, R Long 0-1.	Referee: D Murnane (Macroom)

22 April 2017 Round 1	Seandún	3-11 - 2-11	St. Nicholas'	Páirc Uí Rinn, Cork
	P Cronin 2-3, G Kelleher 1-4, E Buckley 0-3, R Downey 0-1.		G Callanan 2-0, R McCarth-Coade 0-4, D Browne 0-3, Dean Brosnan 0-2, L Forde 0-1, B O'Donovan 0-1.	Referee: E Sheehy (Newcestown)

22 April 2017 Round 1	Ballincollig	3-17 - 1-10	St. Finbarr's	Páirc Uí Rinn, Cork
	C Dorgan 0-9, I Coughlan 2-0, P Kelly 1-0, C O'Sullivan 0-3, E Reilly 0-2, J Miskella 0-1, C Moore 0-1, S Kiely 0-1.		I O'Callaghan 1-6, P Harte 0-2, D Quinn 0-1, A McCarthy 0-1.	Referee: P O'Driscoll (Bride Rovers)

22 April 2017 Round 1	Bishopstown	1-10 - 0-08	Carrigaline	Páirc Liam Mhic Cárthaigh, Ballygarvan
	S Oakes 0-6, D Crowley 1-1, K O'Halloran 0-1, N O'Donovan 0-1, D O'Donovan 0-1.		B Coakley 0-3, D Drake 0-2, E Harrington 0-2, P Mullane 0-1.	Referee: A Long (Argideen Rangers)

23 April 2017 Round 1	Douglas	1-16 - 2-12 (aet)	Clyda Rovers	Blarney
	K Conlon 0-9, A Cadogan 0-5, S Powter 1-0, L Dineen 0-1, S Collins 0-1.	Report	P Cronin 1-3, S O'Connell 1-2, C Flanagan 0-3, Conor O'Sullivan 0-2, Cian O'Sullivan 0-1, J Buckley 0-1.	Referee: J Ryan (Macroom)

23 April 2017 Round 1	University College Cork	2-16 - 1-16	Aghada	Páirc Shéamuis de Barra, Carrigtwohill
	L O'Sullivan 1-5, R Buckley 0-6, D Holmes 1-1, B Ó Beaglaoich 0-3, O Clifford 0-1.		P O'Neill 0-4, S Bennett 1-0, C Fleming 0-3, A Berry 0-2, T O'Neill 0-2, T Hartnett 0-1, M O'Connor 0-1, R Kennedy 0-1, W Leahy 0-1, J O'Shea 0-1.	Referee: P O'Leary (Kilmurry)

30 April 2017 Round 1	Carbery Rangers	2-15 - 1-04	Clonakilty	Ahamilla Grounds, Clonakilty
	J Hayes 1-2, R Kiely 1-1, J O'Rourke 0-3, S Hayes 0-2, A Jennings 0-2, D Hayes 0-1, B Shanahan 0-1, J Fitzpatrick 0-1, S Murray 0-1, K McMahon 0-1.		J Leahy 1-1, D Murphy 0-2, J O'Mahony 0-1.	Referee: K Murphy (Nemo Rangers)

30 April 2017 Round 1	Ilen Rovers	1-13 - 0-16 (aet)	Carbery	Castlehaven
	S Leonard 1-3, D Mac Eoin 0-5, C O'Donovan 0-4, A Holland 0-1.		B O'Driscoll 0-7, R O'Sullivan 0-3, E Goggin 0-2, C Cullinane 0-1, K O'Driscoll 0-1, P Daly 0-1, G O'Donovan 0-1.	Referee: J Ryan (Macroom)

14 May 2017 Round 1 replay	Carbery	4-16 - 1-12	Ilen Rovers	Castlehaven
	M Sugrue 2-8, D O'Driscoll 1-1, S Kelleher 1-0, E Goggin 0-3, K O'Driscoll 0-1, R Deane 0-1, C Cullinane 0-1, R O'Sullivan 0-1.		A Holland 1-2, D Mac Eoin 0-5, T Bushe 0-2, D O'Donovan 0-1, S O'Donovan 0-1, K O'Sullivan 0-1.	Referee: D Murnane (Macroom)

=== Round 2A ===
3 June 2017 Round 2A	Valley Rovers	2-15 - 1-10	Ballincollig	Cloughduv
15:00	B Crowley 1-2, F Lynch 0-5, E Delaney 1-0, E O'Reilly 0-3, D Murphy 0-2, J Walsh 0-2, D Lordan 0-1.		P Kelly 1-3, S Kiely 0-2, C Dorgan 0-1, I Coughlan 0-1, R Noonan 0-1, E Reilly 0-1, D Kierstein 0-1.	Referee: C Dineen (Douglas)

12 June 2017 Round 2A	University College Cork	3-18 - 1-12	Avondhu	Mallow GAA Complex, Mallow
19:30	J Kiely 2-4, C Geaney 0-6, P de Bruin 0-4, B Ó Beaglaoich 1-0, L O'Sullivan 0-2, D Holmes 0-2.		T Clancy 1-3, M Sheehan 0-4, S Walsh 0-2, R O'Hagan 0-1, K O'Connor 0-1, K O'Hanlon 0-1.	Referee: K Murphy (Nemo Rangers)

17 June 2017 Round 2A	Nemo Rangers	0-15 - 2-03	Bishopstown	Páirc Uí Rinn, Cork
	L Connolly 0-4, J Horgan 0-3, B O'Driscoll 0-3, T Ó Sé 0-1, C O'Brien 0-1, P Kerrigan 0-1, C Dalton 0-1, P Gumley 0-1,		D Crowley 2-0, S Oakes 0-2, D Hickey 0-1.	Referee: J Ryan (Macroom)

17 June 2017 Round 2A	Duhallow	4-15 - 1-11	Seandun	Mallow GAA Complex, Mallow
	G O'Connor 1-3, S Hickey 1-3, M Vaughan 1-2, M Healy 1-0, D O'Connor 0-2, A Walsh 0-1, J McLoughlin 0-1, B Daly 0-1, A O'Connor 0-1, M Dilworth 0-1.		P Cronin 0-4, E Buckley 0-4, JP Murphy 1-0, G Kelleher 0-2, R Downey 0-1.	Referee: A Long (Argideen Rangers)

25 July 2017 Round 2A	Carbery Rangers	2-11 - 1-13	Douglas	Ahamilla Grounds, Clonakilty
	J O'Rourke 1-3, J Hayes 0-5, P Hodnett 1-0, B Shanahan 0-2, S Hayes 0-1.		K Conlon 0-5, S Powter 1-1, A Cadogan 0-3, S Collins 0-2, M Dolan 0-2.	Referee: J Ryan (Macroom)

19 August 2017 Round 2A	Castlehaven	1-11 - 0-11	Carbery	Sam Maguire Park, Dunmanway
	M Collins 1-8, P Hurley 0-1, S Dineen 0-1, C Cahalane 0-1.		M Sugrue 0-5, B O'Driscoll 0-2, M Cronin 0-1, R Deane 0-1, C Cullinane 0-1, S Kelleher 0-1.	Referee: K Murphy (Nemo Rangers)

=== Round 2B ===
3 June 2017 Round 2B	Ilen Rovers	0-17 - 0-10	St. Nicholas	Charlie Hurley Park, Bandon
15:00	S O'Donovan 0-10, K O'Sullivan 0-3, D Mac Eoin 0-2, T Bushe 0-1, A Holland 0-1.		L Coughlan 0-7, D Brosnan 0-1, D Dunlea 0-1, D Browne 0-1.	Referee: P O'Leary (Kilmurry)

11 June 2017 Round 2B	Kiskeam	0-14 - 0-13	Aghada	Glanworth
19:30	G Casey 0-6, D Scannell 0-2, M Herlihy 0-2, S O'Sullivan 0-2, T O'Sullivan 0-1, M Casey 0-1.		J Looney 0-5, C Fleming 0-4, P O'Neill 0-2, T O'Neill 0-1, W Leahy 0-1.	Referee: N Wall (Carrigaline)

17 June 2017 Round 2B	Clyda Rovers	0-12 - 0-10	O'Donovan Rossa	Inchigeelagh
	D O'Callaghan 0-6, C Flanagan 0-1, Cian O'Sullivan 0-1, P Cronin 0-1, R Willis 0-1, K Fitzgerald 0-1, S Ronayne 0-1.		K Davis 0-6, M Collins 0-1, C McCarthy 0-1, D Shannon 0-1, D Óg Hodnett 0-1.	Referee: J Larkin (Douglas)

17 June 2017 Round 2B	Muskerry	1-12 - 0-12	Clonakilty	Páirc Naomh Eoin, Newcestown
	D Horgan 1-1, L Shorten 0-3, P Kelleher 0-2, D Goulding 0-2, D Keohane 0-2, S Kiely 0-1, B Shorten 0-1.		D Lowney 0-3, S White 0-3, J O'Mahony 0-2, S McEvoy 0-1, G Barry 0-1, D O'Regan 0-1, L Cahill 0-1.	Referee: N Wall (Carrigaline)

19 June 2017 Round 2B	Cork Institute of Technology	0-10 - 0-07	Dohenys	Páirc Naomh Eoin, Newcestown
	D Culloty 0-5, S O'Sullivan 0-2, M Bradley 0-1, K Hegarty 0-1, C O'Keeffe 0-1.		M Buckley 0-4, K White 0-1, M Quinn 0-1, B McCarthy 0-1.	Referee: C Dineen (Douglas)

16 July 2017 Round 2B	Carrigaline	2-13 - 0-10	Beara	Bunanumera Grounds, Ballinacarriga
	B Coakley 1-6, D Drake 0-4, J McCarthy 1-0, K Kavanagh 0-1, B Pope 0-1, K McIntyre 0-1.		D Harrington 0-5, G Murphy 0-2, D Fenton 0-2, R Murphy 0-1.	Referee: D Murbnane (Macroom)

19 August 2017 Round 2B	St. Finbarr's	3-13 - 0-08	Newcestown	Páirc Uí Rinn, Cork
	S Sherlock 0-9, M Shields 1-1, C Myers-Murray 1-1, P Harte 1-0, D O'Brien 0-2.		C Keane 0-4, M Kelly 0-1, C Dineen 0-1, T Twomey 0-1, S Ryan 0-1.	Referee: A Long (Argideen Rangers)

=== Relegation play-offs ===
14 October 2017 Round 1	Newcestown	0-15 - 0-06	Dohenys	St. Mary's Park, Enniskeane
4:00 pm	M Kelly 0-4, T Twomey 0-4, D Twomey 0-3, C Dineen 0-2, C Keane 0-2.		M Buckley 0-5, D O'Dwyer 0-1.	Referee: M O'Leary (Diarmuid Ó Mathúna's)

28 October 2017 Round 2	Clonakilty	2-11 - 1-09	O'Donovan Rossa	Leap
3:30 pm	J Leahy 1-1, T Clancy 0-4, J Henry 1-0, R Mannix 0-3, D Lowney 0-1, D Murphy 0-1, M O'Sullivan 0-1.		K Davis 1-3, D Hourihane 0-2, D Hazel 0-1, D Óg Hodnett 0-1, C McCarthy 0-1, T Hegarty 0-1.	Referee: J Murphy (Castletownroche)

18 November 2017 Round 2	Dohenys	1-05 - 2-10	St. Nicholas'	Brinny Sportsfield, Brinny
2:00 pm	B O'Donovan 1-0, M Buckley 0-3, J McCarthy 0-1, C O'Donovan 0-1.		M Dooley 2-0, D Brosnan 0-2, P O'Brien 0-2, D Browne 0-2, K Cotter 0-1, D Dunlea 0-1, D O'Callaghan 0-1, G Callanan 0-1.	Referee: J Murphy (Castletownroche)

=== Round 3 ===
11 August 2017 Round 3	Ballincollig	3-21 - 0-16	Muskerry	Cloughduv
	C Dorgan 1-5, P Kelly 1-2, I Coughlan 1-1, S Kiely 0-4, C O'Sullivan 0-2, C Kiely 0-2, R Noonan 0-2, G Durrant 0-1, K Browne 0-1, E O'Reilly 0-1.		D Goulding 0-5, M Ó Laoire 0-2, F Goold 0-2, D Goold 0-2, J Corkery 0-1, B Seartan 0-1, C Vaughan 0-1, D Dineen 0-1, B Cronin 0-1.	Referee: E Sheehy (Newcestown)

11 August 2017 Round 3	Carrigaline	0-15 - 0-09	Seandún	Páirc Uí Rinn, Cork
	E Harrington 0-5, B Coakley 0-4, K McIntyre 0-3, D Drake 0-2, B Pope 0-1.		E Buckley 0-4, R Downey 0-2, D Cremin 0-1, S Fitzgerald 0-1, K Flynn 0-1.	Referee: J Bermingham (Bride Rovers)

12 August 2017 Round 3	Avondhu	2-12 - 0-09	Ilen Rovers	Castle Grounds, Macroom
	C O'Neill 1-3, P Clancy 1-0, R Harkin 0-3, S Beston 0-2, C O'Connell 0-1, M Sheehan 0-1, R O'Hagan 0-1, S O'Sullivan 0-1.		D Mac Eoin 0-4, K O'Sullivan 0-2, A Holland 0-2, S O'Donovan 0-1.	Referee: J Ryan (Macroom)

27 August 2017 Round 3	Kiskeam	2-08 - 1-10	Carbery	Charlie Hurley Park, Bandon
	Maurcie Casey 1-0, Michael Casey 1-0, G Casey 0-3, D Scannell 0-2, S O'Sullivan 0-2, M Herlihy 0-1.		M Sugrue 1-1, M Cahalane 0-4, E Goggin 0-2, B O'Driscoll 0-2, D O'Driscoll 0-1.	Referee: D Murnane (Macroom)

28 August 2017 Round 3	Cork Institute of Technology	2-13 - 2-12	Douglas	Páirc Uí Rinn, Cork
	C O'Keeffe 1-3, K Murphy 1-0, P Clifford 0-3, M Bradley 0-3, S O'Sullivan 0-2, K Hegarty 0-2.		S Powter 1-2, B Collins 1-1, K Conlon 0-4, L Dineen 0-2, S Collins 0-1, S Kingston 0-1.	Referee: A Long (Argideen Rangers)

1 September 2017 Round 3	St. Finbarr's	1-17 - 2-07	Bishopstown	Páirc Uí Rinn, Cork
	S Sherlock 0-8, I Maguire 1-2, C Myers-Murray 0-3, R Leahy 0-1, D O'Brien 0-1, M Shields 0-1, R O'Mahony 0-1.		B Clifford 2-0, D O'Donovan 0-4, P Cronin 0-1, D O'Connor 0-1, C Dorman 0-1.	Referee: J Ryan (Macroom)

- Clyda Rovers received a bye in this round.

=== Round 4 ===
9 September 2017 Round 4	Ballincollig	2-20 - 1-08	Carrigaline	Páirc Uí Ríogáin, Ballinspittle
4:30 pm	C Dorgan 0-13 (0-6f), J Miskella 0-5, C O'Sullivan 1-1, P Kelly 1-0, S Kiely 0-1	Report	D Drake 1-1, E Harrington 0-3, K Kavanagh, K McIntyre, B Coakley (0-1f), B Ryan 0-1 each	Referee: K Murphy (Nemo Rangers)

9 September 2017 Round 4	Nemo Rangers	2-20 - 0-11	Kiskeam	Macroom
6:30 pm	P Kerrigan 1-4, P Gumley 1-2, J Horgan and L Connolly (0-1f, 1 '45) 0-4 each, B O'Driscoll 0-3 (0-2f), A O'Donovan, C O'Brien, C Dalton 0-1 each	Report	S O'Sullivan 0-6 (0-3f), G Casey 0-4 (0-1f), A Carroll 0-1	Referee: D Murnane (Macroom)

10 September 2017 Round 4	Valley Rovers	0-18 - 1-14	Avondhu	Ovens
2:00 pm	F Lynch 0-9 (0-6f, 2 '45), J Walsh and J Cottrell (0-2f) 0-3 each, E O'Reilly, R O'Sullivan, J Lyons 0-1 each		R O'Hagan 0-5, K O'Hanlon 1-1, M Sheehan 0-3, S Beston and R Harkin 0-2 each, C O'Neill 0-1f	Referee: P O'Driscoll (Bride Rovers)

10 September 2017 Round 4	University College Cork	1-15 - 1-11	Clyda Rovers	Pairc Ui Rinn, Cork
7:00 pm	C Geaney 1-5 (0-1f), K Spillane 0-5 (0-2f), L O'Sullivan 0-2, L Bastible, A Spillane, B Ó Beaglaoich 0-1 each	Report	S Ronayne 1-1, C Flanagan (0-2f) and P Cronin (0-1f) 0-3 each, C O'Sullivan 0-2, S O'Connell and D O'Callaghan 0-1 each	Referee: C Dineen (Douglas)

12 September 2017 Round 4	St. Finbarr's	3-06 - 1-04	CIT	Pairc Ui Rinn, Cork
7:30 pm	R O'Mahony 1-2, D O'Brien and M Shields 1-0 each, E Dennehy 0-2, C Lyons and S Sherlock (0-1f) 0-1 each		C Ó Sé 1-0, S Fitzmaurice 0-2, K Fahey and K Hegarty 0-1 each	Referee: J Ryan (Macroom)

- Carbery Rangers, Castlehaven, and Duhallow received byes in this round.

=== Quarter-finals ===
22 September 2017 Quarter-final	St. Finbarr's	1-12 - 0-12	Ballincollig	Pairc Ui Rinn, Cork
7:30 pm	S Sherlock 0-6 (0-3f), E Dennehy 1-0, C Myers-Murray 0-3, D O'Brien 0-2, R O'Mahony 0-1	vdn	C Dorgan 0-7 (0-4f, 1 '45), C Kiely, S Kiely, C O'Sullivan, J Miskella, I Coughlan (0-1f) 0-1 each	Referee: A Long (Argideen Rovers)

23 September 2017 Quarter-final	Carbery Rangers	2-11 - 1-11	Castlehaven	Sam Maguire Park, Dunmanway
7:00 pm	S Hayes 1-3, R Kiely 1-0, J O'Rourke 0-3, J Hayes 0-2 (0-1f), K McMahon, C O'Donovan, B Hodnett 0-1 each		M Collins 0-6 (0-5f), C Cahalane 1-0, M Hurley 0-2, D Cahalane, S Dineen, C O'Driscoll 0-1 each	Referee: D Murnane (Macroom)

24 September 2017 Quarter-final	Duhallow	1-14 - 1-12	Valley Rovers	Castle Grounds, Macroom
7:00 pm	D O'Connor 0-7f, J O'Connor 1-1, M Vaughan 0-3, K Crowley, S Hickey, M Dilworth 0-1 each		F Lynch 1-6 (0-5f), J Cottrell 0-2, D Lynch, D Murphy, G Farrell, T O'Brien 0-1 each	Referee: J Ryan (Macroom)

24 September 2017 Quarter-final	Nemo Rangers	3-18 - 2-16	University College Cork	Pairc Ui Rinn, Cork
7:30 pm	L Connolly 0-9 (0-6f, 2 '45), B O'Driscoll 2-1, K Fulignati 1-0, A O'Donovan 0-3, P Kerrigan 0-2, P Gumley, C Dalton, C Horgan 0-1 each		C Bambury 0-6 (0-1f), C Geaney (0-3f) and S O'Shea (0-4f) 0-5 each, B Ó Beaglaoich and L O'Sullivan 1-0 each	Referee: J Bermingham (Bride Rovers)

=== Semi-finals ===
1 October 2017 Semi-final	Nemo Rangers	5-13 - 0-12	Duhallow	Pairc Ui Rinn, Cork
2:15 pm	L Connolly 3-3 (1-0 pen), P Gumley and C Dalton 1-1 each, J Horgan 0-2, T Ó Sé, B O'Driscoll (0-1f), C O'Brien, C Kiely, J O'Donovan, A Greaney 0-1 each	Report	K Crowley and D O'Connor (0-3f) 0-3 each, A O'Connor 0-2, M Ellis, S Hickey, M Vaughan, E McSweeney 0-1 each	Referee: M Collins (Clonakilty)

1 October 2017 Semi-final	St. Finbarr's	3-14 - 0-14	Carbery Rangers	Pairc Ui Rinn, Cork
4:00 pm	S Sherlock 0-9 (0-6f), R O’Mahony 2-1, C Keane 1-0, E Dennehy 0-2, D O’Brien and R Leahy 0-1 each	Report	J Hayes 0-8f, J Fitzpatrick 0-2, B Shanahan, K McMahon, S Hayes, J O'Rourke 0-1 each	Referee: J Bermingham (Bride Rovers)

=== Finals ===
15 October 2017 Final	Nemo Rangers	0-14 - 0-14	St. Finbarr's	Pairc Ui Chaoimh, Cork
4:00 pm	L Connolly 0-4 (0-2f), B O'Driscoll, C O'Brien, P Gumley 0-2, A O'Donovan, J Horgan, P Kerrigan, C Dalton 0-1 each	Report	S Sherlock 0-8 (0-6f), C Lyons and D O'Brien 0-2 each, I Maguire and C Myers-Murray 0-1 each	Attendance: 9,564; Referee: C Lane (Banteer)

22 October 2017 Final replay	Nemo Rangers	4-12 - 3-13	St. Finbarr's	Pairc Ui Chaoimh, Cork
1:00 pm	P Kerrigan 1-2, J Horgan and L Connolly 1-1 each, A Grainey 1-0, P Gumley and C Dalton 0-2, T Ó Sé, K Fulignati, A O'Donovan, B O'Driscoll 0-1 each	Report	S Sherlock 2-7 (0-3f), E Finn 1-0, R O'Mahony 0-2, C Lyons, D Quinn, D O'Brien, E Dennehy 0-1 each	Attendance: 16,226; Referee: J Bermingham (Bride Rovers); Man of the Match: Jack Horgan

== Championship statistics ==
=== Top scorers ===
Top scorers overall

Rank	Player	Club	Tally	Total	Matches	Average
1	Steven Sherlock	St. Finbarr's	2-48	54	7	7.71
2	Luke Connolly	Nemo Rangers	4-30	42	7	6.00
3	Cian Dorgan	Ballincollig	1-35	38	5	7.60
4	Fiachra Lynch	Valley Rovers	2-24	30	4	7.50
5	Mark Collins	Castlehaven	1-22	25	3	8.33
6	Mark Sugrue	Carbery	3-14	23	3	7.66
6	Kevin Conlon	Douglas	0-23	23	4	5.75
7	Barry O'Driscoll	Nemo Rangers	2-15	21	7	3.00
7	Mark Buckley	Dohenys	1-18	21	4	5.25
8	Paul Kerrigan	Nemo Rangers	2-14	20	7	2.85
8	John Hayes	Carbery Rangers	1-17	20	4	5.00
8	Kevin Davis	O'Donovan Rossa	1-17	20	3	6.66

Top scorers in a single game

Rank	Player	Club	Tally	Total	Opposition
1	Mark Sugrue	Carbery	2-08	14	Ilen Rovers
2	Steven Sherlock	St. Finbarr's	2-07	13	Nemo Rangers
2	Cian Dorgan	Ballincollig	0-13	13	Carrigaline
3	Luke Connolly	Nemo Rangers	3-03	12	Duhallow
4	Mark Collins	Castlehaven	1-08	11	Carbery
5	Jordi Kiely	UCC	2-04	10	Avondhu
5	Colm O'Neill	Avondhu	1-07	10	Kiskeam
5	Seán O'Donovan	Ilen Rovers	0-10	10	ST. Nicholas'
6	Paul Cronin	Seandún	2-03	9	St. Nicholas'
6	Mark Buckley	Dohenys	1-06	9	Aghada
6	Ian O'Callaghan	St. Finbarr's	1-06	9	Ballincollig
6	Brian Coakley	Carrigaline	1-06	9	Beara
6	Fiachra Lynch	Valley Rovers	1-06	9	Duhallow
6	Cian Dorgan	Ballincollig	0-09	9	St. Finbarr's
6	Kevin Conlon	Douglas	0-09	9	Clyda Rovers
6	Steven Sherlock	St. Finbarr's	0-09	9	Newcestown
6	Fiachra Lynch	Valley Rovers	0-09	9	Avondhu
6	Luke Connolly	Nemo Rangers	0-09	9	UCC
6	Steven Sherlock	St. Finbarr's	0-09	9	Carbery Rangers
