= 2018 Cork Senior Football Championship =

Gaelic football competition

- Dates: 18 March 2018 – 28 October 2018
- Teams: 27
- Sponsor: Evening Echo
- Champions: St. Finbarr's (9th title); Ian Maguire (captain); Ray Keane (manager)
- Runners-up: Duhallow; Anthony O'Connor (captain); Pádraig Kearns (manager)
- Relegated: Aghada

Tournament statistics
- Matches played: 42
- Goals scored: 82 (1.95 per match)
- Points scored: 1008 (24 per match)

The 2018 Cork Senior Football Championship was the 130th staging of the Cork Senior Football Championship since its establishment by the Cork County Board in 1887. The draw for the 2018 opening fixtures took place on 10 December 2017. The championship began on 18 March 2018 and ended on 28 October 2018.

Nemo Rangers entered the championship as the defending champions, however, they were defeated by Castlehaven at the quarter-final stage.

On 28 October 2018, St. Finbarr's won the championship following a 3-14 to 2-14 defeat of Duhallow in the final. This was their 9th championship title overall and their first title since 1985.

== Team changes ==
=== To Championship ===
Promoted from the Cork Premier Intermediate Football Championship

- Mallow

== Championship details ==
=== Overview ===
The 2018 championship will see a total of 27 teams compete for the title. These consist of 19 club teams, 6 divisional teams and 2 college teams.

=== Format ===
A new format will be used for the 2018 championship. For the first time since 2015, the divisions and colleges will compete in their own mini championship before entering the championship proper.

==== Divisional and college section ====
Round 1: Eight teams will contest this round. The four winning teams will advance to Round 2. The four losing teams will be eliminated from the championship.

Round 2: Four teams will contest this round. The two winning teams will advance to Round 3 of the championship proper. The two losing teams will be eliminated from the championship.

==== Club section ====
Preliminary round: 2 teams will contest this round. The winning team will advance to Round 1. The losing team will advance to Round 3.

Round 1: 18 teams will contest this round. The nine losing teams will advance to Round 2. The nine winning teams will advance to Round 3.

Round 2: The 9 losing teams from Round 1 will contest this round. The four winning teams will advance to Round 3. The four losing teams will be eliminated from the championship. One team will receive a bye to Round 3.

Round 3: The 9 winning teams from Round 1, the 4 winning teams from Round 2, the bye team and the 2 divisional teams will contest this round. The 8 winning teams will advance to the Quarter-finals. The 8 losing teams will be eliminated from the championship.

Quarter-finals: 8 teams will contest this round. The 4 winning teams will advance to the Semi-finals. The 4 losing teams will be eliminated from the championship.

Semi-finals: 4 teams will contest this round. The 2 winning teams will advance to the Semi-finals. The 2 losing teams will be eliminated from the championship.

Final: The final will be contested by the two semi-final winners.

== Results ==
=== Divisions/colleges section ===
18 March 2018 Round 1	Beara	0-13 - 0-10	Avondhu	Cill na Martra
	D Harrington (2f), D Fenton (3f) 0-5 each, ST O’Sullivan 0-2, A O’Sullivan 0-1.	Report	P Clancy (1f), T O’Shea (2f) 0-3 each, C Lillis 0-2, T O’Sullivan and C O’Mahony 0-1 each.	Referee: P O'Leary (Kilmurry)

20 March 2018 Round 1	Cork Institute of Technology	1-16 - 2-06	Muskerry	Páirc Uí Rinn, Cork
	D Duínnín 0-6, K O'Hanlon 1-2, T Sheehy 0-3, K Murphy 0-2, S O'Sullivan 0-1, S Walsh 0-1, S Bambury 0-1.		J Corkery 1-2, M Ó Duínnín 1-0, B Cronin 0-2, J Moynihan 0-1, F Goold 0-1.

20 March 2018 Round 1	University College Cork	1-16 - 2-12	Carbery	Macroom
	G Murphy 0-5 (1f), R Buckley, C Bambury (1f) 0-3 each, J Ryan 1-0, D O’Brien, M O’Donnell, G O’Sullivan, D Shaw, P Spillane 0-1 each.	Report	D O’Driscoll 1-3 (1-0 pen), G O’Callaghan 1-1, C O’Driscoll, C Cullinane, E Goggin (2f) 0-2 each, P Murphy, J Collins 0-1 each.	Referee: J Ryan (Macroom)

20 March 2018 Round 1	Duhallow	2-17 - 1-03	Seandún	Mallow GAA Complex, Mallow
	S Hickey 1-4, P Walsh 1-0; A O'Connor 0-3 (1f), F O'Connor 0-2, M Dilworth 0-2; K Crowley 0-2, M Healy 0-2, M Vaughan 0-1, B Daly 0-1.	Report	G Kelleher 1-0; B Murphy 0-1f, K O'Flynn 0-1f, A Kidney 0-1f.	Referee: D Murnane (Macroom)

27 March 2018 Round 2	Cork Institute of Technology	1-15 - 1-06	Beara	Macroom
	D Ó Duinnín 1-4, M Bradley 0-5, K O'Hanlon 0-3, C O'Shea 0-1, J Ryan 0-1, A Finnegan 0-1.		BT O'Sullivan 1-0, D Harrington 0-3, R Dillane 0-1, P O'Shea 0-1, C Lowney 0-1.	Referee: A Long (Argideen Rangers)

27 March 2018 Round 2	Duhallow	0-19 - 1-10	University College Cork	O'Connell Park, Glantane
	D O'Connor 0-6 (0-5f), S Hickey 0-6, E McSweeney 0-2; M Healy 0-2, M Dilworth 0-1, K Crowley 0-1, A O'Connor 0-1.	Report	C O'Hannifin 1-0, M O'Donnell 0-3 (2f), R Buckley 0-3 (2f), L O'Sullivan 0-2, D O'Brien 0-1; L Wall 0-1.	Referee: M Sheehan (Liscarroll)

=== Preliminary round ===
7 April 2018 Preliminary round	Valley Rovers	3-12 - 1-12	Mallow	Páirc Uí Rinn, Cork
	Fiachra Lynch 1-8 (5f, 1 '45), J Kiely 1-1, E O'Reilly 1-1, J Walsh 0-2.	Report	C O'Riordan 0-5 (3f), D Hayes 1-0, R Harkin 0-3 (2f), E Stanton 0-1; K Sheehan 0-1, K O'Connor 0-1; E Murphy 0-1.	Referee: J Ryan (Macroom)

=== Round 1 ===
7 April 2018 Round 1	Bishopstown	0-11 - 0-09	Douglas	Páirc Uí Rinn, Cork
	C Dorman 0-3, M Oakes 0-2, M Power 0-1, D O'Connor 0-1, D Costelloe 0-1, B Clifford 0-1, S Oakes 0-1, D Lester 0-1.	Report	S Collins 0-3, J Holland 0-2, C Kingston 0-1, S Wilson 0-1, C Russell 0-1, L Dineen 0-1.	Referee: C Lane (Banteer)

8 April 2018 Round 1	St. Nicholas'	3-11 - 1-14	Kiskeam	Mallow GAA Complex, Mallow
	L Coughlan 0-9, G Kennefick 2-2, D Dooling 1-0.		S O'Sullivan 1-11, M Herlihy 0-3.	Referee: P O'Driscoll (Bride Rovers)

13 April 2018 Round 1	St. Finbarr's	1-17 - 3-06	Carrigaline
	S Sherlock 0-10.

14 April 2018 Round 1	O'Donovan Rossa	1-16 - 3-08	Aghada	Páirc Uí Rinn, Cork
	K Davis 1-11, D Óg Hodnett 0-2, S Crowley 0-1, D Hourihane 0-1, S Fitzgerald 0-1.		R Kennedy 1-2, C Fleming 0-4, S Bennett 1-0, K O'Hanlon 1-0, J O'Shea 0-2.	Referee: P O'Leary (Kilmurry)

14 April 2018 Round 1	Castlehaven	2-15 - 2-10	Dohenys	Rosscarbery
	C O'Driscoll 2-2, C Cahalane 0-6, M Collins 0-4, M Hurley 0-1, D Limrick 0-1, C Nolan 0-1.		F Herlihy 0-4, J O'Connell 1-0, J McCarthy 1-0, J Carroll 0-3, P McCarthy 0-2, K White 0-1.	Referee: C Dineen (Douglas)

14 April 2018 Round 1	Nemo Rangers	1-16 - 0-05	Clyda Rovers	Páirc Uí Rinn, Cork
	L Connolly 1-7, B O'Driscoll 0-3, C O'Brien 0-2, C Horgan 0-1, J Horgan 0-1, J O'Donovan 0-1, A O'Donovan 0-1.		C Flanagan 0-2, D O'Callaghan 0-2, P Cronin 0-1.	Referee: D Murnane (Macroom)

15 April 2018 Round 1	Valley Rovers	3-06 - 1-09	Newcestown	Páirc Uí Rinn, Cork
	J Cottrell 2-0, A Settini 1-0, F Lynch 0-2, D Lynch 0-1, K Canty 0-1, E Delaney 0-1, J Walsh 0-1.		C Dineen 1-1, D Twoemy 0-3, T Twomey 0-2, L Meade 0-1, S Ryan 0-1, M Kelly 0-1.	Referee: C Dineen (Douglas)

15 April 2018 Round 1	Carbery Rangers	0-11 - 0-08	Clonakilty	Castlehaven
	S Hayes 0-2, J Fitzpatrick 0-2, J Hayes 0-2, J O'Rourke 0-2, B Shanahan 0-2, C O'Donovan 0-1.		R Mannix 0-3, T Clancy 0-2, J Henry 0-1, J Leahy 0-1, L O'Donovan 0-1.	Referee: J Bermingham (Bride Rovers)

15 April 2018 Round 1	Ballincollig	0-15 - 0-08	Ilen Rovers	Macroom
	C Dorgan 0-6, C Kiely 0-3, A Donovan 0-2, L Fahy 0-1, S Kiely 0-1, K Crowley 0-1, J Miskella 0-1.		D Mac Eoin 0-3, S Leonard 0-2, D O'Donovan 0-1, P O'Driscoll 0-1, S O'Donovan 0-1.	Referee: P O'Driscoll (Bride Rovers)

=== Round 2 ===
14 July 2018 Round 2	Clyda Rovers	1-12 - 0-09	Aghada	Páirc Uí Rinn, Cork
	C Kelly 1-0, Conor O'Sullivan 0-3, Cian O'Sullivan 0-3, C Flanagan 0-3, P Kissane 0-1, Séamus Ronayne 0-1, P Cronin 0-1.		C Fleming 0-4, P O'Neill 0-2, T Hartnett 0-1, J O'Shea 0-1, R Savage 0-1.	Referee: C Dineen (Douglas)

21 July 2018 Round 2	Mallow	1-16 - 1-12	Kiskeam	O'Connell Park, Glantane
	C O'Riordan 0-10, E Stanton 1-0, R Harkin 0-3, E Murphy 0-2, J Loughrey 0-1.		T O'Sullivan 0-7, S O'Sullivan 0-4, G Casey 1-0, D Scannell 0-1.	Referee: J Bermingham (Bride Rovers)

11 August 2018 Round 2	Carrigaline	1-15 - 2-11	Ilen Rovers	Clonakilty
	M Brosnan 1-2, O Barry 0-4, B Coakley 0-4, A Colohan 0-2, J McCarthy 0-1, K Kavanagh 0-1, B Pope 0-1.		D Mac Eoin 1-5, S Leonard 1-1, K O'Sullivan 0-2, D Hegarty 0-1, C O'Driscoll 0-1, C Harrington 0-1.	Referee: P O'Driscoll (Bride Rovers)

11 August 2018 Round 2	Douglas	0-15 - 0-07	Dohenys	Clonakilty
	C Russell 0-6, E O'Sullivan 0-4, S Collins 0-2, C Kingston 0-2, D Hanrahan 0-1.		F Herlihy 0-2, J Carroll 0-2, D O'Dwyer 0-1, K White 0-1, T O'Leary 0-1.	Referee: D Murnane (Macroom)

12 August 2018 Round 2	Clonakilty	1-15 - 1-13 (aet)	Newcestown	Sam Maguire Park, Dunmanway
	J O'Mahony 0-5, C O'Donoghue 1-0, S White 0-2, D Lowney 0-2, L Cahill 0-2, D O'Regan 0-1, L O'Donovan 0-1, M O'Sullivan 0-1, R Mannix 0-1.		D Twomey 0-7, J Meade 1-1, C Dineen 0-2, L Meade 0-1, M Kelly 0-1, C O'Neill 0-1.	Referee: C Dineen (Douglas)

=== Relegation play-offs ===
8 September 2018 Round 2	Dohenys	1-12 - 1-09	Kiskeam	Macroom
	A Sheehan 0-5, F Herlihy 0-4, J McCarthy 1-0, J Carroll 0-1, J O'Connell 0-1, M Quinn 0-1.	Report	S O'Sullivan 1-3, D Scannell 0-2, A Carroll 0-2, AJ O'Connor 0-1, T O'Sullivan 0-1.	Referee: P O'Driscoll (Bride Rovers)

22 September 2018 Round 1	Ilen Rovers	2-16 - 1-11	Aghada	St. Mary's Park, Enniskean
	S O'Donovan 1-5, D Mac Eoin 0-4, D Hegarty 1-0, P O'Driscoll 0-3, T Regan 0-2, K O'Sullivan 0-1, C O'Driscoll 0-1.		P O'Neill 1-4, A Berry 0-2, M O'Connor 0-2, J O'Donoghue 0-1, J O'Shea 0-1, C Fleming 0-1.	Referee: P O'Leary (Kilmurry)

28 September 2018 Round 3	Aghada	1-06 - 1-07	Newcestown	Páirc Séamus de Barra, Carrigtwohill
	J Tynan 1-0, T Hartnett 0-1, R Kennedy 0-1, S Bennett 0-1, K O'Hanlon 0-1, M O'Connor 0-1, C Fleming 0-1.		D Twomey 1-2, T Twomey 0-2, T Horgan 0-1, C Keane 0-1, J Meade 0-1.	Referee: C Dineen (Douglas)

=== Round 3 ===
8 September 2018 Round 3	Duhallow	1-12 - 0-08	St. Nicholas'	Macroom
	S Hickey 0-4, D Moynihan 1-0, D O'Connor 0-2, E McSweeney 0-2, K Crowley 0-1, P Walsh 0-1, A Walsh 0-1, M Vaughan 0-1.		L Coughlan 0-5, C Horgan 0-1, Dean Brosnan 0-1, S Kennefick 0-1.	Referee: M Collins

8 September 2018 Round 3	St. Finbarr's	3-11 - 1-11	Mallow	Mourne Abbey
	S Sherlock 1-4, I Maguire 1-3, C Myers-Murray 1-1, A McCarthy 0-1, A O'Connor 0-1, C Barrett 0-1.		R Harkin 0-4, C O'Riordan 0-4, M O'Rourke 1-0, J Loughrey 0-2, E Murphy 0-1.	Referee: K Murphy (Nemo Rangers)

9 September 2018 Round 3	Castlehaven	0-21 - 0-21	Cork Institute of Technology	Cloughduv
	M Collins 0-9, M Hurley 0-5, D Cahalane 0-3, C Maguire 0-3, C Hayes 0-1.		D Dineen 0-10, P Clifford 0-5, J Ryan 0-3, S Walsh 0-1, R Walsh 0-1, S O'Sullivan 0-1.	Referee: C Lane (Banteer)

9 September 2018 Round 3	Clonakilty	1-11 - 0-07	Bishopstown	Charlie Hurley Park, Bandon
	J O'Mahony 0-4, S White 1-0, D O'Regan 0-3, D Lowney 0-1, L O'Donovan 0-1, M Scally 0-1, T Clancy 0-1.		C Dorman 0-3, K O'Halloran 0-1, B Clifford 0-1, S Oakes 0-1, N O'Donovan 0-1.	Referee: D Murnane (Macroom)

9 September 2018 Round 3	Valley Rovers	1-16 - 0-08	Clyda Rovers	Coachford
	F Lynch 0-9, E O'Reilly 1-0, K Canty 0-2, D Delaney 0-1, J Walsh 0-1, B Crowley 0-1, J Kiely 0-1, J Cottrell 0-1.		C Flanagan 0-4, K Fitzgerald 0-2, S Ronayne 0-1, C O'Sullivan 0-1.	Referee: P O'Leary (Kilmurry)

9 September 2018 Round 3	Carbery Rangers	0-15 - 1-08	Ballincollig	Charlie Hurley Park, Bandon
	J Hayes 0-4, B Shanahan 0-2, K McMahon 0-2, J Fitzpatrick 0-2, S Hayes 0-2, J O'Rourke 0-2, D Hayes 0-1.		K Browne 1-0, S Kiely 0-3, J Miskella 0-2, C Dorgan 0-1, A Donovan 0-1, C Kiely 0-1.	Referee: C Dineen

9 September 2018 Round 3	Douglas	2-07 - 0-08	Carrigaline	Páirc Liam Mhic Cárthaigh, Ballygarvan
	M Dolan 1-0, B Collins 1-0, D Hanrahan 0-2, E O'Sullivan 0-2, C Russell 0-2, S Collins 0-1.		B Coakley 0-3, O Barry 0-1, M Brosnan 0-1, B Ryan 0-1, Kieran Kavanagh 0-1, W O'Brien 0-1.	Referee: J Ryan (Macroom)

9 September 2018 Round 3	Nemo Rangers	4-16 - 0-13	O'Donovan Rossa	Coachford
	L Connolly 1-8, P Kerrigan 1-2, C O'Donovan 1-0, M Cronin 1-0, C Horgan 0-3, S Martin 0-1, J Horgan 0-1, A O'Reilly 0-1.		K Davis 0-5, D Óg Hodnett 0-2, T Hegarty 0-1, C Crowley 0-1, S Crowley 0-1, B Crowley 0-1, M Collins 0-1, R Byrne 0-1.	Referee: J Bermingham (Bride Rovers)

16 September 2018 Round 3 replay	Castlehaven	0-17 - 1-13	Cork Institute of Technology	Cloughduv
	M Collins 0-9, B Hurley 0-3, C Maguire 0-2, C O'Driscoll 0-2, D McCarthy 0-1.		D Dineen 0-8, S O'Sullivan 1-2, J Ryan 0-2, M Cahalane 0-1.	Referee: D Murnane (Macroom)

=== Quarter-finals ===
22 September 2018 Quarter-final	St. Finbarr's	2-08 - 0-11	Douglas	Páirc Uí Rinn, Cork
	S Sherlock 1-5, E Dennehy 1-0, D O'Brien 0-2, I Maguire 0-1.		E O'Sullivan 0-5, C Russell 0-2, S Kingston 0-1, S Collins 0-1, E Cotter 0-1, D Hanrahan 0-1.	Referee: J Ryan (Macroom)

22 September 2018 Quarter-final	Duhallow	0-13 - 0-10	Valley Rovers	Páirc Uí Rinn, Cork
	D O'Connor 0-6 (0-2f), E McSweeney 0-2, M Vaughan 0-2, L McLoughlin 0-1, S Hickey 0-1, L O'Neill 0-1.	Report	F Lynch 0-6f, E Delaney 0-2, J Cottrell 0-1f, D Murphy 0-1.	Referee: D Murnane (Macroom)

23 September 2018 Quarter-final	Carbery Rangers	1-18 - 0-11	Clonakilty	Sam Maguire Park, Dunmanway
	J Hayes 0-7 (5f), M Hodnett 1-1, J O’Rourke 0-4, A Jennings 0-2, K MacMahon, S Hayes, P Hurley, S O’Neill 0-1 each.	Report	J O’Mahony 0-3f, S White, R Mannix 0-2 each, T Clancy, S McEvoy, D O’Regan and J Henry 0-1 each.	Referee: K Murphy (Nemo Rangers)

23 September 2018 Quarter-final	Nemo Rangers	0-04 - 1-11	Castlehaven	Sam Maguire Park, Dunmanway
	L Connolly 0-3 (2f), P Kerrigan 0-1.	Report	M Hurley 1-1, D McCarthy, M Collins (2f) 0-3 each, D Cahalane (1f, 1 45) 0-2, C Hayes, B Hurley 0-1 each.	Referee: S Bermingham (Bride Rovers)

=== Semi-finals ===
7 October 2018 Semi-final	Duhallow	0-15 - 0-15	Castlehaven	Páirc Uí Chaoimh, Cork
	E McSweeney, D O’Connor (two frees), S Hickey 0-3 each, M Vaughan, A O’Connor 0-2 each, P Walsh, L O’Neill 0-1 each.	Report	M Collins 0-9 (eight frees), B Hurley 0-2, S Dineen, Damien Cahalane (45), M Hurley, J Davis 0-1 each.	Referee: D Murnane (Macroom)

7 October 2018 Semi-final	St. Finbarr's	0-15 - 0-12	Carbery Rangers	Páirc Uí Chaoimh, Cork
	S Sherlock (0-10, 0-6 frees, 0-1 ‘45); E McGreevey, E Finn, C Lyons, I Maguire, M Shields (0-1 each).	Report	J Hayes (0-2 frees), B Shanahan (0-2, 0-1 free, 0- ‘45), J O’Rourke, M Hodnett (0-2 each); R Kiely, S Hayes (0-1 each).	Referee: J Ryan

14 October 2018 Semi-final replay	Duhallow	2-15 - 1-18 (aet)	Castlehaven	Páirc Uí Rinn, Cork
	M Vaughan 0-5 and D O’Connor (0-3 frees) 0-5 each, A O’Connor 1-1, D Moynihan 1-0, S Hickey 0-2, A Walsh and F O’Connor 0-1 each.	Report	M Hurley 1-6, M Collins (frees) 0-4 and C Cahalane 0-4 each, D Cahalane (0-1 ’45) 0-2, C Maguire and C O’Driscoll 0-1 each.	Referee: J Bermingham (Bride Rovers)

20 October 2018 Semi-final second replay	Duhallow	3-13 - 0-16	Castlehaven	Páirc Uí Rinn, Cork
	J O’Connor (1-3, 0-1 ‘45, 0-1 free); D O’Connor (1-3, 1-0 pen, 0-3 frees); S Hickey (1-1); M Vaughan (0-2); P Walsh, F O’Connor, E McSweeney, A O’Connor (0-1 each).	Report	M Collins (0-8, 0-6 frees); M Hurley (0-3); B Hurley (0-2, 0-1 free); D Cahalane (0-1 ‘45), C O’Driscoll, C Cahalane (0-1 each).	Referee: P O'Leary (Kilmurry)

=== Final ===
28 October 2018 Final	St. Finbarr's	3-14 - 2-14	Duhallow	Páirc Uí Chaoimh, Cork
	S Sherlock (1-8, 8 frees), E Finn (1-1), C Lyons (1-0), C Dennehy, E Dennehy, D O’Brien, C Keane, C Barrett (0-1 each).	Report	D O’Connor (1-5, 1-0 pen, 3 frees), J O’Connor (0-3, 2 frees), S Hickey (1-0), E. McSweeney (0-2), P.Walsh, A. Walsh, A. O’Connor, K Crowley (0-1 each).	Attendance: 6,511; Referee: D Murnane (Macroom)

== Championship statistics ==
=== Top scorers ===
Top scorers overall

Rank	Player	Club	Tally	Total	Matches	Average
1	Steven Sherlock	St. Finbarr's	3-37	46	5	9.20
1	Mark Collins	Castlehaven	0-46	46	7	5.14
2	Donncha O'Connor	Duhallow	2-30	36	8	4.50
3	Dan Ó Duinnín	CIT	1-28	31	4	7.75
4	Séamus Hickey	Duhallow	3-21	30	8	3.75
5	Fiachra Lynch	Valley Rovers	1-25	28	4	7.00
6	Luke Connolly	Nemo Rangers	2-18	24	3	8.00
6	Seán O'Sullivan	Kiskeam	2-18	24	3	8.00
7	Michael Hurley	Castlehaven	2-17	23	7	3.28
8	Kevin Davis	O'Donovan Rossa	1-16	19	2	9.50
8	Cian O'Riordan	Mallow	0-19	19	3	6.66

Top scorers in a single game

Rank	Player	Club	Tally	Total	Opposition
1	Seán O'Sullivan	Kiskeam	1-11	14	St. Nicholas'
1	Kevin Davis	O'Donovan Rossa	1-11	14	Aghada
2	Fiachra Lynch	Valley Rovers	1-08	11	Mallow
2	Luke Connolly	Nemo Rangers	1-08	11	O'Donovan Rossa
2	Steven Sherlock	St. Finbarr's	1-08	11	Duhallow
3	Luke Connolly	Nemo Rangers	1-07	10	Clyda Rovers
3	Steven Sherlock	St. Finbarr's	0-10	10	Carrigaline
3	Cian O'Riordan	Mallow	0-10	10	Kiskeam
3	Dan Ó Duinnín	CIT	0-10	10	Castlehaven
3	Steven Sherlock	St. Finbarr's	0-10	10	Carbery Rangers

=== Miscellaneous ===
- St. Finbarr's won the championship for the first time since 1985.
