= Cian Dorgan =

Irish Gaelic footballer

Personal information
- Native name: Cian Ó Deargáin (Irish)
- Born: 1995 (age 30–31) Ballincollig, Cork, Ireland
- Occupation: Engineer

Sport
- Sport: Gaelic football
- Position: Right corner-forward
Club*
Years	Club	Apps (scores)
2013-present	Ballincollig	45 (10-218)
Club titles
- Cork titles: 1
College
- Years: College
- 2014-2018: University College Cork
College titles
- Sigerson titles: 0
Inter-county**
Years	County	Apps (scores)
2018	Cork	0 (0-00)
Inter-county titles
- Munster titles: 0
- All-Irelands: 0
- NFL: 0
- All Stars: 0
- * club appearances and scores correct as of 18:16, 15 September 2024. **Inter County team apps and scores correct as of 23:53, 23 April 2021.

Cian Dorgan (born 1995) is an Irish hurler and Gaelic footballer who plays for club side Ballincollig. He is a former member of the Cork senior football team.

== Career ==
Dorgan first came to prominence with the Ballincollig minor hurling team that won the Premier 2 Championship title in 2012. He subsequently joined the club's senior teams in both codes and experienced his greatest success in 2014 when the Ballincollig senior football team won the County Senior Championship title. Two years later he was top scorer when the Ballincollig hurlers claimed the County Intermediate Championship. By this stage, Dorgan had also made an impression on the inter-county scene as a Gaelic footballer. In spite of not being included on the Cork minor team, he was an unused substitute on the Cork under-21 team that lost the 2016 All-Ireland final to Mayo. Dorgan also lined out with the Cork senior football team on a number of occasions during the 2018 National League.

== Career statistics ==
=== Club ===
As of match played 15 September 2024

Team	Season	Cork		Munster		All-Ireland		Total	
Team	Season	Apps	Score	Apps	Score	Apps	Score	Apps	Score
Ballincollig	2013-14	2	0-02	—		—		2	0-02
Ballincollig	2014-15	5	1-21	1	0-03	—		6	1-24
Ballincollig	2015-16	3	1-13	—		—		3	1-13
Ballincollig	2016-17	5	2-31	—		—		5	2-31
Ballincollig	2017-18	5	1-35	—		—		5	1-35
Ballincollig	2018-19	2	0-07	—		—		2	0-07
Ballincollig	2019-20	4	0-17	—		—		4	0-17
Ballincollig	2020-21	4	1-23	—		—		4	1-23
Ballincollig	2021-22	3	0-17	—		—		3	0-17
Ballincollig	2022-23	4	2-17	—		—		4	2-17
Ballincollig	2023-24	4	1-20	—		—		4	1-20
Ballincollig	2024-25	3	1-12	—		—		3	1-12
Career total		44	10-215	1	0-03	—		45	10-218

=== Inter-county ===
Team	Year	National League			Munster		All-Ireland		Total	
Team	Year	Division	Apps	Score	Apps	Score	Apps	Score	Apps	Score
Cork	2018	Division 2	4	0-01	0	0-00	0	0-00	4	0-01
Career total			4	0-01	0	0-00	0	0-00	4	0-01

== Honours ==
Ballincollig

- Cork Senior Football Championship: 2014
- Cork Intermediate Hurling Championship: 2018
- Cork Premier 2 Minor Hurling Championship: 2012

Cork

- McGrath Cup: 2018
- Munster Under-21 Football Championship: 2016
