= Ovens, County Cork =

Village in County Cork, Ireland

Ovens Na hUamhanna
- Village
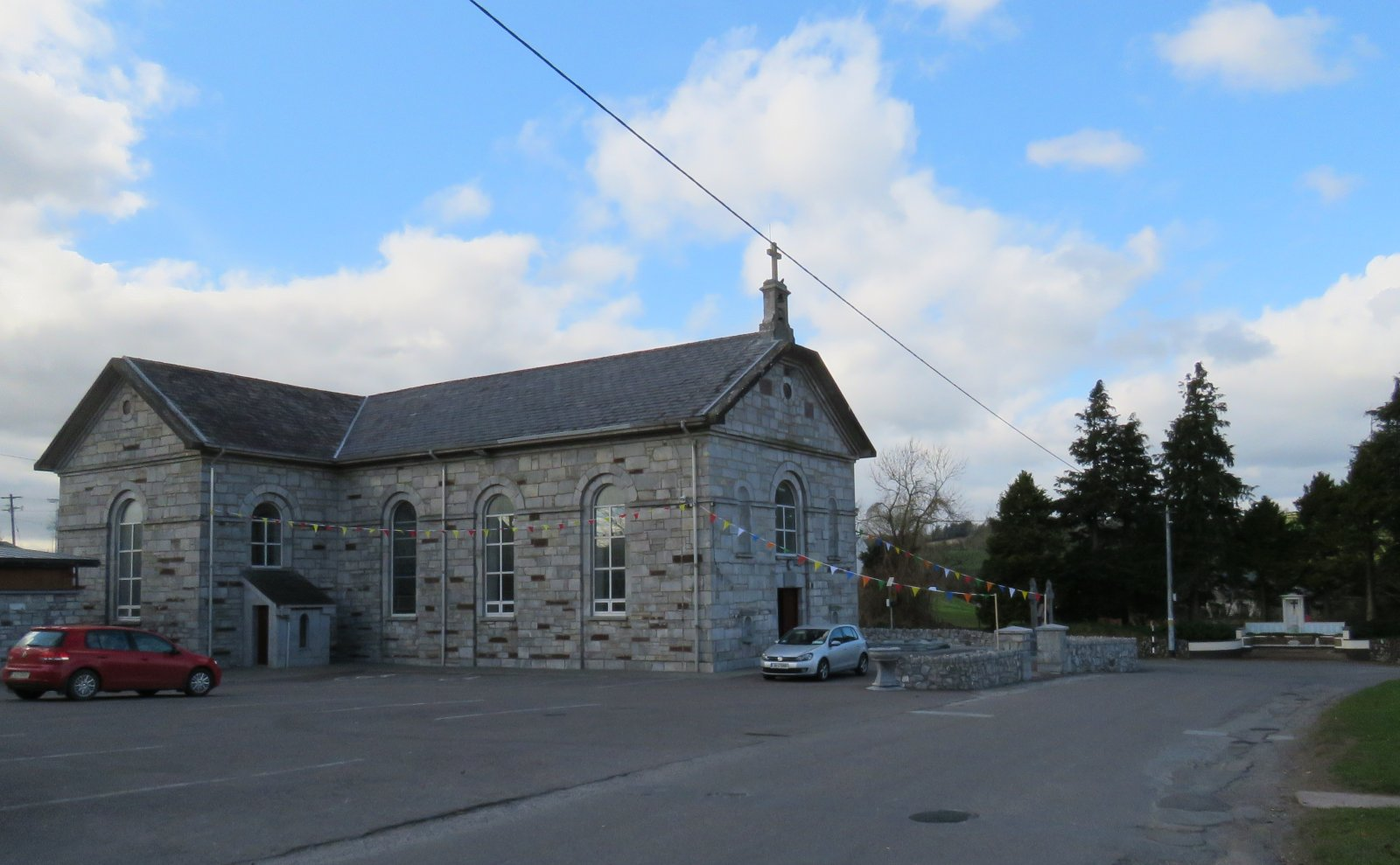
- St. John The Baptist Church

- Location in Ireland
- Coordinates: 51°52′41″N 8°39′54″W
- Country: Ireland
- Province: Munster
- County: County Cork
- EU Parliament: South

Population (2006)
  - Total: 1,703
- (Ovens Electoral Division)
- Time zone: UTC+0 (WET)
  - Summer (DST): UTC-1 (IST (WEST))
- Irish Grid Reference: W541695

Ovens (Irish: Na hUamhanna), formerly also Athnowen, is a small village and electoral division (ED) adjacent to the town of Ballincollig, County Cork, Ireland. The 2006 census recorded that the population of Ovens ED was then 1,703 people - an increase of 62.1% from the 2002 census. Ovens also gives its name to a civil parish and Catholic parish of the same name. It lies within the Dáil constituency of Cork North-West.

== History ==
Ovens, from the Irish na hUamhanna meaning 'caves', takes its name from a limestone cave system which spans the area. Some evidence of human use of the caves was unearthed during excavations in the mid-19th century. Other evidence of ancient settlement in the area includes several souterrain, ringfort, standing stone and fulacht fiadh sites.

In Samuel Lewis's Topographical Dictionary of Ireland, published in 1837, Ovens is described under the Anglican parish name of Athnowen:

ATHNOWEN (ST. MARY), or OVENS, a parish partly in the barony of BARRETTS, but chiefly in that of EAST MUSKERRY, county of CORK, and province of MUNSTER, 1½ mile (W.) from Ballincollig; containing 1953 inhabitants. This parish, which is generally called Ovens, is situated on the south line of road from Cork to Macroom, and is bounded on the north by the river Lee, and intersected by the Bride.

Lewis describes the parish as spanning "4660 statute acres", stating that the area's "limestone is quarried to some extent for burning into lime for the supply of the hilly districts to the north and south for a distance of several miles". Of the religious structures in the parish, the entry in the Topographical Dictionary of Ireland states that:

The church is a neat ancient structure with a square tower crowned with pinnacles. There is a glebe-house, with a glebe of 20a. 2r. 17p. In the Roman Catholic divisions this parish is the head of a union or district called Ovens, which included also the parishes of Desertmore and Aglish, and the ploughlands of Millane and Killumney, in the parish of St. Finbarr, Cork: the chapel, erected in 1835 is a handsome edifice of hewn limestone, in the mixed Gothic and Grecian styles of architecture.

Lewis also describes the caves which gives the area its name:

Near the bridge of Ovens over the river Bride is the entrance of the celebrated limestone caves, which Smith, in his history of Cork, describes as 18 feet in height; but from the accumulation of rubbish they are now not more than three feet high and are nearly filled with water. They branch off into several ramifications, and from the roofs of some of them depend stalactites of various forms: their dimensions have never been satisfactorily ascertained. There some remains of the ancient castle called Castle Inchy.

== Amenities ==
Ovens remains a largely rural area, though urban Éire Óg is the local parish hurling and Gaelic football club. Agriculture remains the dominant local industry, though companies such as EMC Corporation and John A. Wood Ltd. provide employment to locals and those in the greater Cork area.

There is one primary school, Ovens National School, and the local Roman Catholic parish is the Ovens / Farran parish.

Based on Pobal's "HP Deprivation Index scores", one of Oven's two electoral divisions was among the most affluent in Ireland as of 2022.

== See also ==
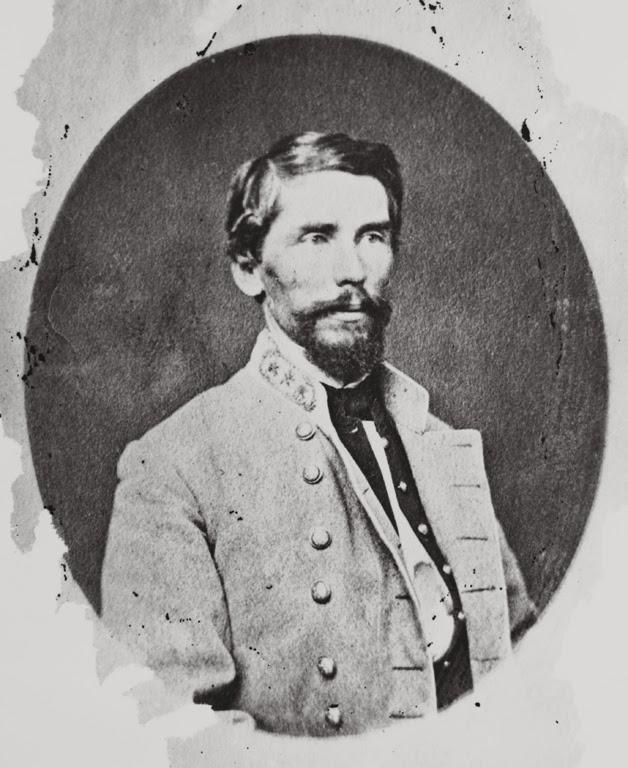
Patrick Cleburne, a major general in the Confederate States Army, was born at Bride Park Cottage, Ovens.

- List of towns and villages in Ireland
- Patrick Cleburne (1828–1864; Confederate general born in the Ovens area)
