= Damien Cahalane =

Cork hurler and Gaelic footballer

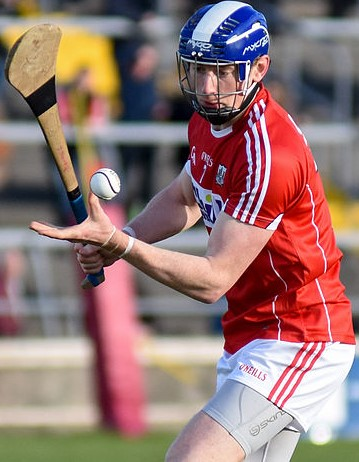

Personal information
- Native name: Damien Ó Cathaláin (Irish)
- Nickname: Damo
- Born: 10 August 1992 (age 34) Wilton, Cork, Ireland
- Occupation: Bar owner
- Height: 6 ft 2 in (188 cm)

Sport
- Sport: Hurling
- Position: Full-back
Clubs
- Years: Club
- Castlehaven; St Finbarr's
Club titles
	Football	Hurling
Cork titles	2	1
College
- Years: College
- 2011–: University College Cork
College titles
- Fitzgibbon titles: 0
Inter-county*
Years	County	Apps (scores)
2012–	Cork	55 (0-05)
Inter-county titles
- Munster titles: 4
- All-Irelands: 0
- NHL: 1
- All Stars: 0
- *Inter County team apps and scores correct as of 21:25, 21 June 2026.

Damien Cahalane (born 10 August 1992) is an Irish hurler and Gaelic footballer who plays as a centre-back for club sides St Finbarr's and Castlehaven and as a full-back at senior level with the Cork county hurling team.

== Early life ==
Cahalane was born in Wilton, Cork. His father, Niall Cahalane, and his uncle, John Cleary, won All-Ireland medals as members of the Cork senior football team in 1989 and 1990. His aunt, Nollaig Cleary, won nine All-Ireland medals with Cork. His brother, Conor Cahalane, has also played for Cork.

== Playing career ==
=== College ===
Cahalane first came to prominence as a dual player with Coláiste an Spioraid Naoimh in Bishopstown. Having played both codes at every grade, he won a Cork Colleges Under-16½ B medal in 2009.

=== University ===
As a student at University College Cork, Cahalane also became involved in Gaelic games. On 8 March 2012, he won an All-Ireland Freshers Championship medal following a 0–24 to 3–11 defeat of the University of Limerick.

=== Club ===
In spite of living in Cork city, Cahalane joined the Castlehaven football club in West Cork at a young age and played in all grades at juvenile and underage levels, winning two divisional under-21 championship medals and a county under-21 championship medal in 2010. He simultaneously played hurling with the St Finbarr's club. On 8 October 2012, Cahalane was at centre-back when Castlehaven defeated Duhallow by 1–7 to 0–9 to win the county senior championship. Castlehaven retained the title on 13 October 2013 after a two-point defeat of Nemo Rangers, with Cahalane winning a second championship medal.

=== Inter-county ===
==== Minor and under-21 ====
Cahalane first played for Cork as a member of the minor football team in 2009. A dual player in his second season at minor, he won a Munster medal with the footballers after a one-point defeat of Kerry in the final. On 19 September 2010, Cahalane was at midfield when Cork were defeated by Tyrone in the All-Ireland final.

Cahalane continued his dual status with the Cork under-21 teams, however, he enjoyed little success with the hurling team. During his three years with the Cork under-21 footballers, the team remained undefeated in the provincial championship, with Cahalane winning successive Munster medals in 2011, 2012 and 2013. Cahalane was captain of the team for the third title. On 4 May 2013, Cahalane was at full-back when Cork suffered a 1–14 to 1–11 defeat by Galway in the All-Ireland final.

==== Senior ====
Cahalane made his senior debut for Cork in a Waterford Crystal Cup defeat of Kerry on 4 February 2012. He made his first start in a National League game in a four-point defeat of Galway on 18 March 2012, before making his first championship start at full-back later that season in an All-Ireland Qualifier against Wexford. The following season, Cahalane switched codes to Gaelic football, making his senior debut in a McGrath Cup game on 6 January 2013. He made his first start in a National League game in a 1–18 to 2–09 defeat by Dublin on 2 February 2013, before making his first championship start later that season in a Munster Championship quarter-final against Limerick. Cahalane underwent a double hip operation at the end of the season.

At the start of 2014, Cahalane committed to playing for both the Cork senior hurling and football teams for the upcoming season. Following Cork's defeat by Kerry in the Munster final, Cahalane suffered a large gash to his heel when he stepped on a medicinal vial in the shower in Páirc Uí Chaoimh. The injury threatened his participation in the provincial hurling final, however, on 13 July 2014, Cahalane won his first Munster medal after a six-point defeat of Limerick.

At the end of the 2014 season Cahalane decided to end his association with the Cork football team and to concentrate on hurling. On 9 July 2017, he won his second Munster medal following a 1–25 to 1–20 defeat of Clare in the final.

On 1 July 2018, Cahalane won a third Munster medal following a 2–24 to 3–19 defeat of Clare in the final.

On the 6th of April 2025 Cahalane won his first National League title following at 3–24 to 0–23 defeat of Tipperary in Páirc Uí Chaoimh.

== Career statistics ==
As of 21 June 2026

Team	Year	National League			Munster		All-Ireland		Total	
Team	Year	Division	Apps	Score	Apps	Score	Apps	Score	Apps	Score
Cork	2012	Division 1A	1	0-00	0	0-00	1	0-00	2	0-00
Cork	2013	Division 1A	—		—		—		—	
Cork	2014	Division 1B	2	0-00	4	0-01	1	0-00	7	0-01
Cork	2015	Division 1A	5	0-00	1	0-00	3	0-01	9	0-01
Cork	2016	Division 1A	5	0-01	1	0-00	2	0-00	8	0-01
Cork	2017	Division 1A	4	0-00	3	0-00	1	0-00	8	0-00
Cork	2018	Division 1A	1	0-00	5	0-00	1	0-00	7	0-00
Cork	2019	Division 1A	5	0-00	2	0-00	2	0-00	9	0-00
Cork	2020	Division 1A	2	0-04	1	0-00	2	0-00	5	0-04
Cork	2021	Division 1A	4	0-01	1	0-00	2	0-00	7	0-01
Cork	2022	Division 1A	5	0-00	3	0-00	2	0-01	10	0-01
Cork	2023	Division 1A	3	0-00	4	0-01	—		7	0-01
Cork	2024	Division 1A	3	0-00	3	0-00	1	0-00	7	0-00
Cork	2025	Division 1A	4	0-00	3	0-01	1	0-00	8	0-01
Cork	2026	Division 1A	2	0-00	4	0-00	1	0-00	7	0-00
Career total			46	0-06	35	0-03	20	0-02	101	0-11

== Honours ==
University College Cork

- All-Ireland Freshers Hurling Championship: 2012

Castlehaven

- Munster Senior Club Football Championship: 2023
- Cork Premier Senior Football Championship: 2012, 2013, 2023
- Cork Under-21 Football Championship: 2010

St Finbarr's

- Cork Premier Senior Hurling Championship: 2022

Cork

- Munster Senior Hurling Championship: 2014, 2017, 2018, 2025
- National Hurling League: 2025
- Munster Under-21 Football Championship: 2011, 2012, 2013 (c)
- Munster Minor Football Championship: 2010

Sporting positions
Preceded by Donal Óg Hodnett	Cork Under-21 Football Captain; 2013	Succeeded by Conor Dorman
