= 2022 Cork Premier Senior Football Championship =

- Dates: 9 June - 30 October 2022
- Teams: 12 clubs 6 divisions 2 colleges
- Sponsor: Bon Secours Hospital
- Champions: Nemo Rangers (23rd title); Luke Connolly (captain); Paul O'Donovan (manager)
- Runners-up: St. Finbarr's; Ian Maguire (captain); Paul O'Keeffe (manager)
- Relegated: Newcestown

Tournament statistics
- Matches played: 34
- Goals scored: 80 (2.35 per match)
- Points scored: 799 (23.5 per match)
- Top scorer(s): Luke Connolly (4-24); Brian Hurley (1-33)

The 2022 Cork Premier Senior Football Championship was the third staging of the Cork Premier Senior Football Championship and the 134th staging overall of a championship for the top-ranking Gaelic football teams in Cork. The championship ran from 9 June to 30 October 2022.

St. Finbarr's entered the championship as the defending champions. Newcestown's relegation after a playoff defeat by Éire Óg ended 11 years of top tier football for the club.

The final was played on 30 October 2022 at Páirc Uí Chaoimh in Cork, between Nemo Rangers and St. Finbarr's, in what was their third ever meeting in the final overall and a first meeting in five years. Nemo Rangers won the match by 1-16 to 2-09 to claim their 23rd championship title overall and a first title in two years.

Luke Connolly and Brian Hurley were the championship's joint-top scorers.

== Team changes ==
=== To Championship ===
Promoted from the Cork Senior A Football Championship

- Mallow

=== From Championship ===
Relegated to the Cork Senior A Football Championship

- Ilen Rovers

== Participating teams ==
=== Clubs ===
The seedings were based on final group stage positions from the 2021 championship.

Top seeds Second seeds

Team	Location	Colours	Manager	Captain
St. Finbarr's	Togher	Blue and yellow	Paul O'Keeffe	Ian Maguire
Clonakilty	Clonakilty	Green and red	Haulie O'Neill	Eoghan Deasy
Douglas	Douglas	Green, white and black	Ray Keating	
Castlehaven	Castlehaven	Blue and white	James McCarthy	Mark Collins
Valley Rovers	Innishannon	Green and white	Mike Murphy	
Éire Óg	Ovens	Red and yellow	Turlough O'Brien	Daniel Goulding
Nemo Rangers	Trabeg	Black and green	Paul O'Donovan	Luke Connolly
Ballincollig	Ballincollig	Green and white	Podsie O'Mahony	Luke Fahy
Newcestown	Newcestown	Red and yellow	Tim Buckley	Seán O'Donovan
Carbery Rangers	Rosscarbery	Green, white and gold	Declan Hayes	Thomas O'Rourke
Carrigaline	Carrigaline	Blue and yellow		
Mallow	Mallow	Red and yellow	Keith Moynihan	Ryan Harkin

=== Divisions and colleges ===
Team	Location	Colours	Manager	Captain
Avondhu	North Cork	Black and yellow	Martin Crummy	Shane Beston
Beara	Beara Peninsula	Red and white	Andrew Fitzgerald	Brian Terry O'Sullivan
Carbery	West Cork	Purple and yellow	Tim Buckley	Colm O'Driscoll
Duhallow	Duhallow	Orange and black	Ned English	Séamus Hickey
Imokilly	East Cork	Red and white	Eoin O'Neill	Mike Kelly
MTU Cork	Bishopstown	Red and white		Paul Ring
Muskerry	Mid Cork	Green and white	Ger McCarthy	Joe Creedon
University College Cork	College Road	Red and black	Aidan Kelleher	Bill Curtin

== Group A ==
=== Group A table ===
Advanced to knockout stage Advanced to relegation play-off

Team	Matches				Score			Pts
Team	Pld	W	D	L	For	Against	Diff	Pts
St. Finbarr's	3	3	0	0	62	33	29	6
Carbery Rangers	3	2	0	1	43	46	-3	4
Carrigaline	3	1	0	2	41	57	-16	2
Éire Óg	3	0	0	3	37	47	-10	0

=== Group A results ===
22 July 2022 Round 1	St. Finbarr's	1-12 - 0-09	Éire Óg	Páirc Uí Rinn
	C Myers Murray (0-5, 0-3 frees); B Hayes, E Twomey (0-3 each); I Maguire (1-0); A O’Connor (0-1).	Report	D Goulding (0-5, 0-4 frees); C O’Callaghan (0-2); R O’Toole, J Kelleher (0-1 each).	Referee: A Long (Argideen Rangers)

23 July 2022 Round 1	Carbery Rangers	2-10 - 1-09	Carrigaline	Charlie Hurley Park
	J O’Rourke 1-2 (1-0 pen), P O’Rourke 1-1, J Kevane 0-2, P Shanahan 0-2 45, J O’Riordan, A Jennings, J O’Regan 0-1 each.	Report	I Sheerin 1-0, K O’Reilly 0-3 (0-2 f), C Barrett and E Desmond 0-2 each, B Coakley and D King 0-1 each.	Referee: C Dineen (Douglas)

14 August 2022 Round 2	St. Finbarr's	3-19 - 1-11	Carrigaline	Páirc Uí Rinn
	C Myers-Murray 0-10, 7f, B Hayes 2-3, E Twomey 1-3, I Maguire, E McGreevey, B O’Connor 0-1 each.	Report	R McCarthy 1-3, 2f, K O’Reilly 0-3, 2f, E Ryle, J McCarthy, K Kavanagh, E Desmond, L Boyle 0-1 each.	Referee: C Dineen (Douglas)

14 August 2022 Round 2	Éire Óg	1-12 - 2-11	Carbery Rangers	Charlie Hurley Park
	D Goulding 0-7 (0-4f), C O’Callaghan 1-2, J Cooper, K Hallissey, B Hurley 0-1 each.	Report	D Hayes 1-1 (0-1f), A Jennings 1-0. P O’Rourke, J O’Regan 0-2 each, J O’Riordan, J Kevane, B Shanahan, J O’Rourke, P Shanahan (0-1 45), J Hayes (0-1f) 0-1 each.	Referee: J Bermingham (Bride Rovers)

4 September 2022 Round 3	St. Finbarr's	2-13 - 0-10	Carbery Rangers	Henry Ford Park
	C Myers-Murray 1-4, S Sherlock 0-6 (0-3 f), E Twomey 1-2 (0-1 f), B Hayes 0-1.	Report	D Hayes 0-4 (0-1 f), P O’Rourke and M Hodnett 0-2 each, B Kerr, J Hayes 0-1 each.	Referee: J Regan (Lough Rovers)

4 September 2022 Round 3	Éire Óg	1-10 - 1-12	Carrigaline	Páirc Liam Mhic Cárthaigh
	D Goulding 0-6 (0-5 f), C O’Callaghan 1-1, J Cooper, B Hurley, R O’Toole 0-1 each.	Report	N O’Keeffe 1-1, D Drake 0-3, B Coakley 0-3 (0-1 f), R McCarthy 0-2 (0-1 f), N O’Keeffe, K O’Reilly, C Barrett 0-1 each.	Referee: D Daly (Brian Dillons)

== Group B ==
=== Group B table ===
Advanced to knockout stage

Team	Matches				Score			Pts
Team	Pld	W	D	L	For	Against	Diff	Pts
Mallow	3	2	0	1	43	30	13	4
Ballincollig	3	1	1	1	48	42	6	3
Douglas	3	1	1	1	42	42	0	3
Valley Rovers	3	1	0	2	33	52	-19	2

=== Group B results ===
22 July 2022 Round 1	Douglas	1-06 - 0-10	Valley Rovers	Páirc Liam Mhic Cárthaigh
	A Cotter 1-0, A O’Hare (0-1f), T Sheehy 0-2 each, K Hayes Curtin, D Kelly 0-1 each.	Report	D O’Shea, C McCarthy, E Delaney 0-2 each, W Hurley, E O’Reilly, J Cottrell (0-1f), F Lynch (0-1f) 0-1 each.	Referee: C Lane (Lyre)

23 July 2022 Round 1	Mallow	0-10 - 0-06	Ballincollig	Clyda Rovers Grounds
	J Browne 0-3 (0-2 f), J Dillon 0-2 (0-1 f), S Copps, D Moynihan, E Stanton, R Harkin, S McDonnell (f) 0-1 each.	Report	C Kiely 0-2 (0-1 f), H Aherne, S Kiely, D Murphy (f), J O’Connor (f) 0-1 each.	Referee: P O'Driscoll (Bride Rovers)

13 August 2022 Round 2	Valley Rovers	0-07 - 2-11	Mallow	Coachford Grounds
	F Lynch 0-3 (0-2 f); B Crowley 0-2 f; W Hurley, C McCarthy 0-1 each.	Report	S McDonnell 1-3 (0-3 f); K O’Sullivan 1-1; J Browne (0-2 f), R Harkin 0-3 each; J Dillon 0-1.	Referee: P O'Leary (Kilmurry)

14 August 2022 Round 2	Douglas	0-16 - 1-13	Ballincollig	Páirc Uí Rinn
	A Cotter 0-7, 6f, J Holland 0-2f, A O’Hare, N Hartnett 0-2 each, D Kelly, S Powter, A O’Connell 0-1 each.	Report	D Murphy 0-6, C Dorgan 0-4, 1f, L O’Connell 1-0, D O’Mahony 0-2, J O’Connor 0-1.	Referee: J Regan (Lough Rovers)

4 September 2022 Round 3	Douglas	2-11 - 2-10	Mallow	Páirc Uí Rinn
	A Cotter 0-8 (0-7 f, 0-1 45), D Kelly 1-1, D Harte 1-0, B Hartnett, A O’Hare 0-1 each.	Report	D Moynihan 2-0, S McDonnell 0-3 (0-1 f), R Harkin 0-3 (0-2 f), J Browne 0-2 f, P Herlihy, J Loughrey 0-1 each.	Referee: D Murnane (Macroom)

4 September 2022 Round 3	Ballincollig	4-14 - 2-10	Valley Rovers	Kilmurry Grounds
	C Dorgan 0-7 (0-6 f), S Kiely 2-0, D Murphy 1-2, R Noonan 1-0, C Kiely 0-2, S Dore, L O’Connell, H Aherne 0-1 each.	Report	F Lynch 0-5 (0-3 f), A Walsh-Murphy 1-0, E O’Reilly 1-0, E Delaney 0-2, B Crowley 0-2 (0-1 f), A Kenneally 0-1.	Referee: C Lane (Banteer)

== Group C ==
=== Group C table ===
Advanced to knockout stage Advanced to relegation play-off

Team	Matches				Score			Pts
Team	Pld	W	D	L	For	Against	Diff	Pts
Nemo Rangers	3	3	0	0	46	34	12	6
Castlehaven	3	2	0	1	50	42	8	4
Clonakilty	3	0	1	2	27	30	-3	1
Newcestown	3	0	1	2	32	49	-17	1

=== Group C results ===
23 July 2022 Round 1	Nemo Rangers	2-10 - 1-05	Newcestown	Brinny Sportsfield
	L Connolly 1-4 (0-2 f, 0-1 45), M Cronin 1-0, B O’Driscoll, A O’Donovan 0-2, K O’Donovan, C McCartan 0-1 each.	Report	D Buckley 0-4 (0-2 f, 0-1 m), C Dineen 1-0, S O’Sullivan 0-1.	Referee: J Ryan (Macroom)

24 July 2022 Round 1	Clonakilty	1-05 - 0-10	Castlehaven	Rosscarbery Grounds
	S McEvoy 1-0, C Daly 0-3 (0-1 f), J Grimes, B White (f) 0-1 each.	Report	B Hurley 0-6 (0-4 f), M Hurley 0-2, C Nolan, D Cahalane 0-1 each.	Referee: J O'Regan (Lough Rovers)

13 August 2022 Round 2	Nemo Rangers	3-13 - 1-16	Castlehaven	Ahamilla Grounds
	L Connolly 2-4 (1-0 pen, 0-2 f), M Cronin 0-5, K Fulignati 1-0, L Horgan, C Horgan, P Kerrigan, R Dalton 0-1 each.	Report	B Hurley 0-9 (0-6 f), J Cahalane 1-0, M Hurley, R Minihane 0-2 each, D Cahalane, M Collins, C Maguire 0-1 each.	Referee: C Lane (Banteer)

14 August 2022 Round 2	Clonakilty	0-12 - 1-09	Newcestown	Charlie Hurley Park
	B White 0-7 (0-5f), B Ridgeway, G Barry, D Lowney, C Kenneally, J Grimes 0-1 each.	Report	J Meade 1-1, E Kenneally 0-5 (0-2f), T Twomey, O Walsh 0-1 each.	Referee: D Murnane (Macroom)

4 September 2022 Round 3	Clonakilty	0-07 - 0-08	Nemo Rangers	Charlie Hurley Park
	C Daly 0-4 (0-1 f), E Deasy, G Barry, S McEvoy 0-1 each.	Report	M Cronin 0-3 (0-1 f), L Connolly, L Horgan, B O’Driscoll, P Kerrigan, C McCartan 0-1 each.	Referee: J Bermingham (Bride Rovers)

4 September 2022 Round 3	Castlehaven	3-12 - 1-09	Newcestown	Rossmre Grounds
	B Hurley 1-3 (0-3 f), M Hurley, R Maguire 1-1 each, M Collins, C Maguire 0-3 each, C Cahalane 0-1.	Report	T Twomey 1-1, L Meade 0-3, E Kenneally, R O’Sullivan 0-2 f each, C Goggin 0-1.	Referee: A Long (Argideen Rangers)

== Divisional/colleges section ==
=== Preliminary stage ===
9 June 2022 Round 1	Avondhu	3-10 - 0-14	Beara	Castle Grounds
	M Linehan 2-1, D O’Brien 1-4 (0-1 f), S Walsh 0-2, K Twomey, S Beston, D Price 0-1 each.	Report	ST O’Sullivan 0-5 f, P O’Neill, BT O’Sullivan, T Murphy (0-1 f) 0-2 each, J Harrington, C O’Sullivan, J O’Shea 0-1 each.	Referee: A Whelton (Clonakilty)

9 June 2022 Round 1	Carbery	2-18 - 1-10	Imokilly	Ballincollig GAA Grounds
	S Daly 0-7 (0-4 f), D O’Sullivan, P O’Driscoll 1-1 each, G Callaghan 0-3, K O’Driscoll 0-2, C O’Driscoll, K O’Driscoll, K Keohane, S Ryan 0-1 each.	Report	M Kelly 0-5 (0-2 f), C McLoughlin 1-0, S Bennett, A Berry, T Hartnett, C Spriggs, P O’Neill 0-1 each.	Referee: P O'Leary (Kilmurry)

16 June 2022 Round 2	Muskerry	0-10 - 0-16	Beara	Sam Maguire Park
	C Vaughan 0-5 (0-2 f), C O’Leary, C Galvin, C Cotter, J Hayes, M Healy 0-1 each.	Report	ST O’Sullivan 0-5 (0-4 f), F Finner, J Harrington, BT O’Sullivan 0-3 each, T Murphy, M Shea 0-1 each.	Referee: L O'Shea (Carbery Rangers)

23 June 2022 Round 3	Imokilly	w/o - scr.	Muskerry	Ovens GAA Grounds

30 June 2022 Semi-final	Carbery	1-12 - 0-08	Beara	Wolfe Tone Park
	R Deane 1-7 (0-6 f), S Daly 0-2 f, D O’Sullivan, C O’Driscoll, B O’Driscoll 0-1 each.	Report	C Lowney 0-4 (0-3 f, 0-1 45), P O’Neill 0-2 (0-1 f), S O’Sullivan (mark), J Harrington 0-1 each.	Referee: R Whelan (Aghada)

30 June 2022 Semi-final	Avondhu	2-15 - 1-17	Imokilly	St. Catherine's Park
	D Pyne, S O’Sullivan 1-0 each, S Walsh, K Twomey 0-3 each, J Sheehan 0-3 (0-1 f), M Lenihan 0-3 f, S Beston 0-2, J Twomey 0-1.	Report	C Beausang 1-3, M Kelly 0-4 f, D Creedon 0-4 (0-2 f), T Hartnett 0-2, P O’Neill, K O’Shea, S O’Reilly, S Bennett 0-1 each.	Referee: C Walsh (Nemo Rangers)

7 July 2022 Final	Carbery	3-18 - 0-11	Avondhu	Coachford GAA Grounds
	R Deane 1-4, 1f, B O’Driscoll 0-5, 2f, D Scannell and G O’Callaghan 1-0 each, K O’Driscoll 0-3, S Daly 0-3, 2f, S Ryan, A Hayes, O Corcoran 0-1 each.	Report	M Keane 0-2, J O’Gorman, S O’Sullivan, S Beston, D Pyne, J Twomey, K Twomey, D O’Brien, M Lenehan, W Fuohy 0-1 each.	Referee: J Regan (Lough Rovers)

=== Semi-finals ===
17 August 2022 Semi-final	MTU Cork	1-09 - 2-18	Duhallow	O'Connell Park
	D Lenihan 1-0, S Walsh and C O’Donoghue 0-2 each, David O’Connor 0-2, 1f, 1 ‘mark’, A O’Shea, N Donohue and D O’Leary 0-1 each.	Report	D O’Connor 0-7, 5f, M McAuliffe 1-4, G O’Sullivan 0-4, S Hickey 1-1, L Murphy and J Curtin 0-1 each.	Referee: C Walsh (Nemo Rangers)

17 August 2022 Semi-final	University College Cork	2-13 - 2-18	Carbery	Castle Grounds
	D Geaney(3f) 1-6, S O’Connor 1-4, N Geaney, C O’Beaglaoigh, R Murphy 0-1 each.	Report	Brian O’Driscoll 1-9 (1-0 pen, 0-7f), P O’Driscoll 1-0, A Hayes 0-3, R Deane (2f), G O’Callaghan 0-2 each, D Scannell, K O’Driscoll 0-1 each.

- Duhallow, MTU Cork and University College Cork received byes to this stage.

=== Final ===
21 August 2022 Final	Duhallow	0-15 - 0-16	Carbery	Páirc Uí Rinn
	D O’Connor 0-3 (0-1 m), J Curtin 0-3 (0-1 f), Seamus Hickey, Shane Hickey, M McAuliffe 0-2 each, D Cashman, P Walsh, L Murphy 0-1 each.	Report	B O’Driscoll 0-5 (0-2 f), P O’Driscoll, C O’Driscoll, K O’Driscoll 0-2 each, J O’Regan 0-2 (0-1 f), S Daly, A Hayes, R Deane (f) 0-1 each.	Referee: R Whelan (Aghada)

== Knockout stage ==
=== Bracket ===
Quarter-Finals
Mallow (Avondhu)	0-13
Castlehaven (Carbery)	2-14
Nemo Rangers (Seandun)	2-04
Carbery Rangers (Carbery)	0-09
Ballincollig (Muskerry)	4-11
Carbery	1-15

Semi-Finals
St. Finbarr's (Seandun)	2-17
Castlehaven (Carbery)	1-16
Nemo Rangers (Seandun)	1-16
Ballincollig (Muskerry)	0-09

Final
St. Finbarr's (Seandun)	2-09
Nemo Rangers (Seandun)	1-16

=== Relegation playoff ===
17 September 2022 Playoff	Éire Óg	2-10 - 0-14	Newcestown	Brinny Sportsfield
	D Goulding 0-6f, M Griffin 1-1, C O’Callaghan 1-0, Joe Cooper 0-2, John Cooper 0-1.	Report	D Buckley 0-6 (0-3f), M Kennelly 0-4 (0-2f), J Meade 0-2, N Kelly, T Horgan 0-1 each.	Referee: C Lane (Banteer)

=== Quarter-finals ===
17 September 2022 Quarter-final	Nemo Rangers	2-04 - 0-09	Carbery Rangers	Páirc Uí Chaoimh
	J Horgan, B O’Driscoll 1-0 each, B Murphy, L Connolly, A O’Donovan, R Dalton 0-1 each.	Report	J Hayes 0-3 f, Jerry O’Riordan, A Jennings, J Hodnett, J O’Rourke, D Hayes (mark), P Shanahan (45) 0-1 each.	Referee: J Ryan (Macroom)

17 September 2022 Quarter-final	Mallow	0-13 - 2-14	Castlehaven	Páirc Uí Chaoimh
	R Harkin 0-6 (0-4 f); S Hayes 0-2 (0-1 mark), S Merritt, P Herlihy, K O’Sullivan, S McDonnell (f), S Hayes 0-1 each.	Report	B Hurley 0-7 (0-4 f, 0-1 45); M Hurley 1-1; R Minihane 1-0; R Whelton, C Maguire 0-2 each; J Cahalane, C Cahalane 0-1 each.	Referee: J Regan (Lough Rovers)

18 September 2022 Quarter-final	Carbery	1-15 - 4-11	Ballincollig	Páirc Uí Chaoimh
	R Deane 1-4 (0-3 f), B O’Driscoll 0-7 (0-5 f, 0-1 45), P O’Driscoll 0-2, G O’Callaghan, K O’Driscoll 0-1 each.	Report	C Dorgan 2-4 (2-0 pen, 0-1 f), D Murphy 2-3, D O’Mahony 0-2, L O’Connell, L Fahy 0-1 each.	Referee: C Dineen (Douglas)

=== Semi-finals ===
2 October 2022 Semi-final	Nemo Rangers	1-16 - 0-09	Ballincollig	Páirc Uí Chaoimh
	L Connolly 1-6 (0-3 45, 0-1f), C Horgan 0-3, M Cronin (f), J Horgan, B Cripps, A O’Donovan, K O’Donovan 0-1 each.	Report	C Dorgan, D Murphy, C Kiely 0-2 each, L Fahy, P O’Neill, D O’Mahony 0-1 each.	Referee: A Long (Argideen Rangers)

2 October 2022 Semi-final	St. Finbarr's	2-17 - 1-16	Castlehaven	Páirc Uí Chaoimh
	S Sherlock (1-6), B Hayes (1-2, 0-1 mark), E McGreevey and C Myers Murray (0-3 each), E Dennehy (0-2), J Burns (0-1).	Report	B Hurley (0-8, 0-5 frees), M Hurley (1-2), C Maguire (0-3), D Cahalane, R Minihane and A Whelton (0-1 each).	Referee: C Lane (Banteer)

=== Final ===
30 October 2002 Final	Nemo Rangers	1-16 - 2-09	St. Finbarr's	Páirc Uí Chaoimh
	L Connolly 0-8 (0-5 f), C Horgan 1-3, R Dalton 0-2, K O’Donovan, B O’Driscoll, K O’Sullivan 0-1 each.	Report	S Sherlock 0-6 (0-5 f), B Hayes and B Hennessy 1-0 each, I Maguire, E McGreevey, B O’Connor 0-1 each.	Attendance: 10,513; Referee: A Long (Argideen Rangers)

== Championship statistics ==
=== Top scorers ===
Overall

Rank	Player	Club	Tally	Total	Matches	Average
1	Luke Connolly	Nemo Rangers	4-24	36	6	6.60
1	Brian Hurley	Castlehaven	1-33	36	5	7.20
3	Brian O'Driscoll	Carbery	1-27	30	5	6.00
4	Ruairí Deane	Carbery	3-18	27	6	4.50
5	Cillian Myers-Murray	St. Finbarr's	1-22	25	5	5.00
6	Daniel Goulding	Éire Óg	0-24	24	4	6.00
7	Darren Murphy	Ballincollig	3-14	23	5	4.60
7	Cian Dorgan	Ballincollig	2-17	23	4	5.75
9	Brian Hayes	St. Finbarr's	4-09	21	5	4.20
9	Steven Sherlock	St. Finbarr's	1-18	21	5	4.20

In a single game

Rank	Player	Club	Tally	Total	Opposition
1	Brian O'Driscoll	Carbery	1-09	12	UCC
2	Cian Dorgan	Ballincollig	2-04	10	Carbery
2	Luke Connolly	Nemo Rangers	2-04	10	Castlehaven
2	Ruairí Deane	Carbery	1-07	10	Beara
2	Cillian Myers-Murray	St. Finbarr's	0-10	10	Carrigaline
6	Brian Hayes	St. Finbarr's	2-03	9	Carrigaline
6	Darren Murphy	Ballincollig	2-03	10	Carbery
6	Steven Sherlock	St. Finbarr's	1-06	9	Castlehaven
6	Dylan Geaney	UCC	1-06	9	Carbery
6	Luke Connolly	Nemo Rangers	1-06	9	Ballincollig
6	Brian Hurley	Castlehaven	0-09	9	Nemo Rangers
