= Brian Hurley =

Irish Gaelic footballer

Personal information
- Born: 2 April 1992 (age 34) Union Hall, County Cork, Ireland
- Occupation: Sales rep
- Height: 1.78 m (5 ft 10 in)

Sport
- Sport: Gaelic Football
- Position: Full-forward
Club*
Years	Club	Apps (scores)
2009-present	Castlehaven	77 (21-325)
Club titles
- Cork titles: 4
- Munster titles: 1
College
- Years: College
- 2010-2013: Institute of Technology, Carlow
Inter-county**
Years	County	Apps (scores)
2012-present	Cork	45 (10-105)
Inter-county titles
- Munster titles: 0
- All-Irelands: 0
- NFL: 0
- All Stars: 0
- * club appearances and scores correct as of 20:55, 28 September 2025. **Inter County team apps and scores correct as of 17:25, 1 February 2026.

Brian Hurley (born 2 April 1992) is an Irish Gaelic footballer. At club level he plays with Castlehaven and at inter-county level with the Cork senior football team.

== Career ==
Hurley first played Gaelic football as a six-year-old at juvenile level with the Castlehaven club. He progressed through the various juvenile and underage grades, while he also played as a schoolboy with Rossa College in Skibbereen. Hurley's performances at school level resulted in him being selected for the Cork vocational schools' team and he won All-Ireland VS SFC honours in 2010 after a defeat of Monaghan.

Hurley had just turned 17 when he made his senior team debut with Castlehaven in 2009. He has his first major success a year later when Castlehaven beat Ballincollig to win the Cork U21AFC title. Consecutive Cork SFC titles followed for Hurley in 2012 and 2013. He claimed a third winners' medal in 2023 before ending the season with a Munster Club SFC title.

At inter-county level, Hurley first played for Cork during a two-year tenure with the minor team. His final game in the grade was an All-Ireland final defeat by Tyrone in 2010. Hurley's three-year tenure with the under-21 team yielded three successive Munster U21FC medals, however, his last game was, once again, an All-Ireland final defeat.

Hurley made his senior team debut in 2013, having joined the extended panel a year earlier. Since then he has been an eight-time Munster SFC runners-up. Hurley was also a member of Munster's Railway Cup panel in 2014, while he has also been an All-Star nominee.

== Career statistics ==
=== Club ===
As of match played 28 September 2025

Team	Season	Cork		Munster		All-Ireland		Total	
Team	Season	Apps	Score	Apps	Score	Apps	Score	Apps	Score
Castlehaven	2009-10	3	0-02	—		—		3	0-02
Castlehaven	2010-11	3	0-03	—		—		3	0-03
Castlehaven	2011-12	5	2-10	—		—		5	2-10
Castlehaven	2012-13	6	2-13	3	0-06	—		9	2-19
Castlehaven	2013-14	6	3-47	1	0-01	—		7	3-48
Castlehaven	2014-15	3	3-14	—		—		3	3-14
Castlehaven	2015-16	5	3-24	—		—		5	3-24
Castlehaven	2016-17	2	1-10	—		—		2	1-10
Castlehaven	2017-18	0	0-00	—		—		0	0-00
Castlehaven	2018-19	6	0-08	—		—		6	0-08
Castlehaven	2019-20	1	0-04	—		—		1	0-04
Castlehaven	2020-21	5	0-25	—		—		5	0-25
Castlehaven	2021-22	5	4-29	—		—		2	1-09
Castlehaven	2022-23	5	1-33	—		—		5	1-33
Castlehaven	2023-24	5	1-19	3	1-20	1	0-07	9	2-46
Castlehaven	2024-25	5	0-28	1	0-03	—		6	0-31
Castlehaven	2025-26	3	0-19	—		—		3	0-19
Career total		68	20-288	8	1-30	1	0-07	77	21-325

=== Inter-county ===
As of 1 February 2026

Team	Year	National League			Munster		All-Ireland		Total	
Team	Year	Division	Apps	Score	Apps	Score	Apps	Score	Apps	Score
Cork	2013	Division 1	0	0-00	3	1-08	2	0-05	5	1-13
Cork	2014	Division 1	8	1-30	2	0-05	2	1-05	12	2-40
Cork	2015	Division 1	9	2-11	3	0-01	1	0-01	13	2-13
Cork	2016	Division 1	7	1-13	1	0-01	0	0-00	8	1-14
Cork	2017	Division 2	0	0-00	0	0-00	0	0-00	0	0-00
Cork	2018	Division 2	0	0-00	2	0-01	1	0-00	3	0-01
Cork	2019	Division 2	5	2-00	2	3-00	4	2-07	11	7-07
Cork	2020	Division 3	0	0-00	2	0-02	—		2	0-02
Cork	2021	Division 2	3	1-08	2	1-09	—		5	2-17
Cork	2022	Division 2	6	1-15	1	0-00	3	2-08	10	3-23
Cork	2023	Division 2	5	1-16	0	0-00	4	0-16	9	1-32
Cork	2024	Division 2	7	0-24	2	0-12	3	0-07	12	0-43
Cork	2025	Division 2	3	0-03	2	0-07	3	0-10	8	0-20
Cork	2026	Division 2	2	0-05	0	0-00	0	0-00	2	0-05
Total			55	9-125	22	5-46	23	5-59	100	19-230

== Honours ==
Rossa College

- All-Ireland Vocational Schools Senior Football Championship: 2010

Castlehaven

- Munster Senior Club Football Championship: 2023
- Cork Premier Senior Football Championship: 2012, 2013, 2023, 2024
- Cork Under-21 A Football Championship: 2010
- West Cork Under-21 A Football Championship: 2010

Cork

- Munster Under-21 Football Championship: 2011, 2012, 2013
- Munster Minor Football Championship: 2010

Sporting positions
Preceded by Ian Maguire	Cork Senior Football Joint Captain; 2022; With: Seán Meehan	Incumbent
