= 2013 Cork Senior Football Championship =

Gaelic football competition

- Dates: 19 March 2013 – 13 October 2013
- Teams: 25
- Sponsor: Evening Echo
- Champions: Castlehaven (5th title); Seán Cahalane (captain); Finbarr Santry (manager)
- Runners-up: Nemo Rangers; Steven O'Brien (manager)
- Relegated: Newmarket

Tournament statistics
- Matches played: 44
- Top scorer(s): Brian Hurley (3-47)

The 2013 Cork Senior Football Championship was the 115th staging of the Cork Senior Football Championship since its establishment by the Cork County Board in 1887. The championship began on 19 March 2013 and ended on 13 October 2013.

Castlehaven entered the championship as the defending champions.

On 13 October 2013, Castlehaven won the championship following a 0-16 to 1-11 defeat of nemo Rangers in the final. This was their 5th championship title overall and their second title in succession.

Castlehaven's Brian Hurley was the championship's top scorer with 3-47.

== Team changes ==
=== To Championship ===
Promoted from the Cork Premier Intermediate Football Championship

- St. Vincent's

=== From Championship ===
Relegated to the Cork Premier Intermediate Football Championship

- Na Piarsaigh

== Results ==
=== Divisional section ===
19 March 2013 Round 1	Imokilly	0-04 - 2-16	Cork Institute of Technology	Riverstown Sportsfield, Sallybrook
	P Cahill 0-4.		M Vaughan 0-6, J O'Connor 1-2, P O'Connor 1-1, P Daly 0-2, K Hallissey 0-2, W O'Mahony 0-1, D Daly 0-1, P Joy 0-1.	Referee: D Murnane (Macroom)

28 March 2013 Round 1	Beara	2-09 - 0-09	Muskerry	Sam Maguire Park, Dunmanway
	D Harrington 1-2, T O'Sullivan 1-1, BJ O'Sullivan 0-2, D Fintan 0-2, A O'Sullivan 0-1, F O'Dwyer 0-1.		D Goulding 0-4, L Shorten 0-2, N O'Leary 0-1, D Goold 0-1, M Ó Conchúir 0-1.	Referee: D White (St. Mary's)

28 March 2013 Round 1	Carbery	0-09 - 0-12	University College Cork	Cloughduv
	D Barron 0-5, C O'Driscoll 0-2, J Wall 0-1, G O'Callaghan 0-1.		C Sweeney 0-3, P Acheson 0-2, E Buckley 0-2, K O'Driscoll 0-2, N Daly 0-1, P Murphy 0-1, B Coughlan 0-1.	Referee: N Wall (Carrigaline)

28 March 2013 Round 1	Duhallow	1-11 - 1-07	Avondhu	Fitzgerald Park, Fermoy
	S Hickey 1-2, M Herlihy 0-2, T Collins 0-2, K Buckley 0-1, J Cott 0-1, A Walsh 0-1, B Dennehy 0-1, M Casey 0-1.		C O'Riordan 1-1, A O'Brien 0-3, T O'Shea 0-2, J Loughrey 0-1.	Referee: J Ryan (Macroom)

2 April 2013 Round 2	Seandún	0-10 - 0-06	Imokilly	Tank Field, Montenotte
	P Cronin 0-4, E Hegarty 0-1, T Lawrence 0-1, E Murnane 0-1, J Kind 0-1, M Howard 0-1, D Cremin 0-1.		P Cahill 0-4, A Frahill-O'Connor 0-1, E Connolly 0-1.	Referee: B Coniry (Crosshaven)

11 April 2013 Round 2	Muskerry	0-10 - 1-11	Avondhu	Mourne Abbey
	S Kiely 0-3, M O'Connor 0-1, L Shorten 0-1, L Walsh 0-1, D Goold 0-1, D Goulding 0-1, A Concannon 0-1, D Ring 0-1.		M Sheehan 0-4, V Donoghue 1-0, D Pyne 0-2, J Loughrey 0-1, E Stanton 0-1, H Dockery 0-1, C O'Riordan 0-1, S Beston 0-1.	Referee: J Bermingham (Bride Rovers)

16 April 2013 Round 3	Avondhu	0-07 - 1-14	University College Cork	Fitzgerald Park, Fermoy
	D Pyne 0-2, E O'Connor 0-2, E Stanton 0-1, J Loughrey 0-1, V O'Donoghue 0-1.		P Crowley 1-2, C Cox 0-5, D O'Sullivan 0-2, E Buckley 0-2, K O'Driscoll 0-1, C Sweeney 0-1, P Murphy 0-1.

16 April 2013 Round 3	Seandún	0-07 - 2-12	Duhallow	Mallow GAA Complex, Mallow
	E Buckley 0-2, P Cronin 0-2, C Buckley 0-1, D Cremin 0-1, K Brosnan 0-1.		M Herlihy 1-1, A Walsh 0-4, M Dilworth 0-4, S Hickey 1-0, T Collins 0-2, AJ O'Connor 0-1.	Referee: J Bermingham (Bride Rovers)

21 April 2013 Round 3	Carbery	3-11 - 2-11 (aet)	Beara	Adrigole
	C O'Driscoll 1-2, R Deane 1-2, E Goggin 1-0, D Barron 0-3, S Coughlan 0-2, M Sugrue 0-1, P Nolan 0-1.		D Harrington 2-3, KG O'Sullivan 0-2, D Fenton 0-2, BJ O'Sullivan 0-1, BT O'Sullivan 0-1, Liam Harrington 0-1, J Harrington 0-1.	Referee: P O'Leary (Kilmurry)

8 May 2013 Round 4	University College Cork	0-15 - 0-15 (aet)	Cork Institute of Technology	Páirc Uí Rinn, Cork
	C Sweeney 0-4, C Cox 0-4, K O'Driscoll 0-3, E Buckley 0-2, S O'Brien 0-1, T Hickey 0-1.		C Vaughan 0-5, C Sheehan 0-3, P O'Connor 0-2, P Joy 0-2, M Vaughan 0-2, J Corkery 0-1.	Referee: J Dorgan (Nemo Rangers)

3 June 2013 Round 4 replay	University College Cork	0-11 - 0-18	Cork Institute of Technology	Páirc Uí Rinn, Cork
	S O'Brien 0-5, P Acheson 0-2, P Crowley 0-2, E Buckley 0-1, C Buckley 0-1.		C Vaughan 0-5, M Vaughan 0-3, P O'Connor 0-3, J O'Connor 0-2, D Leahy 0-2, C Sheehan 0-2, J Corkery 0-1.	Referee: M Collins (Clonakilty)

4 June 2013 Round 4	Carbery	2-14 - 1-07	Duhallow	Coachford Pitch, Coachford
	M Sugrue 1-4, D Barron 1-3, J Wall 0-1, R Deane 0-1, P Nolan 0-1, C O'Driscoll 0-1, P Kirby 0-1, G O'Callaghan 0-1, E Goggin 0-1.		J Cott 1-1, D O'Connor 0-3, T Collins 0-2, M Dilworth 0-1.	Referee: J Bermingham (Bride Rovers)

=== Round 1 ===
5 May 2013 Round 1	Newcestown	0-13 - 1-08 (aet)	St. Vincent's	Páirc Liam Mhic Cárthaigh, Ballygarvan
	D Twomey 0-3, D Twomey 0-2, E Kelly 0-1, H Curran 0-1, C O'Neill 0-1, M Kelly 0-1, S Ryan 0-1, M O'Brien 0-1, C Keane 0-1, J Desmond 0-1.		C Barry 1-1, C Lynch 0-2, D O'Connor 0-1, A Harte 0-1, A Buckley 0-1, J Buckley 0-1, D Duggan 0-1.	Referee: D Murnane (Macroom)

5 May 2013 Round 1	O'Donovan Rossa	1-13 - 1-07	Dohenys	Drimoleague
	D Óg Hodnett 0-10, C Crowley 1-0, C McCarthy 0-2, R Hegarty 0-1.		M Quinn 0-4, A Sheehan 1-0, B McCarthy 0-1, M Milner 0-1, D Collins 0-1.	Referee: K Murphy (Nemo Rangers)

6 May 2013 Round 1	Douglas	1-07 - 2-10	Ballincollig	Páirc Uí Rinn, Cork
	F Desmond 1-0, M Harrington 0-2, P Beale 0-1, B Cuthbert 0-1, S Collins 0-1, K Murphy 0-1, A Cadogan 0-1.		C O'Sullivan 1-1, D Tobin 1-1, P Kelly 0-2, S Kiely 0-1, J Kelly 0-1, J Miskella 0-1, C Dorgan 0-1, G Durrant 0-1, D Murphy 0-1.	Referee: C Lane (Banteer)

11 May 2013 Round 1	Bishopstown	0-08 - 0-09	Ilen Rovers	Charlie Hurley Park, Bandon
	B O'Callaghan 0-4, D O'Donovan 0-2, S Oakes 0-1, D Hickey 0-1.		D Mac Eoin 0-4, K O'Sullivan 0-2, P O'Driscoll 0-1, D O'Donovan 0-1, M Hellen 0-1.	Referee: J Ryan (Macroom)

11 May 2013 Round 1	Aghada	1-07 - 0-13	Clonakilty	Páirc Liam Mhic Cárthaigh, Ballygarvan
	C Fleming 1-3, M Russell 0-1, T Wall 0-1, R Kennedy 0-1, R Power 0-1.		B O'Mahony 0-6, J Leahy 0-4, D O'Regan 0-2, D Murphy 0-1.	Referee: P O'Leary (Kilmurry)

11 May 2013 Round 1	Carbery Rangers	2-14 - 0-07	Newmarket	Coachford Pitch, Coachford
	J Hayes 0-6, J Fitzpatrick 1-2, K Fitzpatrick 1-0, J O'Rourke 0-4, D Hayes 0-1, A Jennings 0-1.		D Culloty 0-3, J Lane 0-1, T O'Keeffe 0-1, J Ryan 0-1, B Daly 0-1.	Referee: D Moynihan (Grenagh)

11 May 2013 Round 1	Castlehaven	0-16 - 1-13 (aet)	Nemo Rangers	Charlie Hurley Park, Bandon
	B Hurley 0-8, M Collins 0-2, D Cahalane 0-2, R Whelton 0-1, J Davis 0-1, D Hegarty 0-1, Stephen Hurley 0-1.		L Connolly 1-4, J Masters 0-5, P Kerrigan 0-2, K Fulignati 0-1, W Morgan 0-1.	Referee: J Bermingham (Bride Rovers)

12 May 2013 Round 1	St. Finbarr's	0-15 - 2-08	St. Nicholas'	Páirc Uí Rinn, Cork
	R O'Mahony 0-5, J Sexton 0-3, C Lyons 0-1, J Goggin 0-1, J Burns 0-1, P Wiley 0-1, P Murphy 0-1, R Leahy 0-1, E Dennehy 0-1.		R Brosnan 1-0, M Dooley 1-0, E Kearney 0-3, D Brosnan 0-2, B O'Donovan 0-1, A O'Brien 0-1, P O'Brien 0-1.	Referee: C McAllister (Aghada)

30 May 2013 Round 1 replay	Castlehaven	4-10 - 1-12	Nemo Rangers	Charlie Hurley Park, Bandon
	B Hurley 2-5, M Hurley 1-1, S Nolan 1-0, S Hurley 0-2, M Collins 0-1, S Dineen 0-1.		P Kerrigan 1-2, L Connolly 0-4, J Masters 0-4, A Cronin 0-1, W Morgan 0-1.	Referee: C Lane (Banteer)

=== Round 2 ===
22 June 2013 Round 2	Nemo Rangers	2-09 - 0-05	St. Nicholas'	Páirc Uí Rinn, Cork
	A Cronin snr 1-1, D Nation 1-1, B O'Driscoll 0-3, A Morgan 0-2, J Masters 0-1, L Connolly 0-1.		E Kearney 0-3, T Spain 0-1, B O'Donovan 0-1.	Referee: C Lane (Banteer)

22 June 2013 Round 2	Aghada	1-08 - 0-09	Newmarket	Mourne Abbey
	T Hartnett 1-0, R Kennedy 0-3, M Russell 0-2, P O'Neill 0-1, E Savage 0-1, C Fleming 0-1.		D Culloty 0-2, P O'Toole 0-2, J Lane 0-1, B O'Leary 0-1, T O'Keeffe 0-1, J Ryan 0-1, TJ Brosnan 0-1.	Referee: B Coniry (Crosshaven)

22 June 2013 Round 2	Douglas	1-10 - 1-05	St. Vincent's	Páirc Uí Rinn, Cork
	M Harrington 1-3, S McCarthy 0-2, A Cadogan 0-1, F Desmond 0-1, D Hanrahan 0-1, J Lane 0-1, O Mulrooney 0-1.		S Ray 1-0, K Lynch 0-3, J Buckley 0-1, D O'Connor 0-1.	Referee: M Collins (Clonakilty)

24 June 2013 Round 2	Bishopstown	2-14 - 2-12	Dohenys	Castle Grounds, Macroom
	D O'Donovan 0-5, B O'Callaghan 1-1, S Oakes 1-0, C Dormer 0-2, F Ó Deasmhúnaigh 0-2, D Crowley 0-1, P Honohan 0-1, D Lester 0-1, M Power 0-1.		S Collins 1-1, P Collins 1-1, J McCarthy 0-3, M Quinn 0-2, A Sheehan 0-2, D O'Donovan 0-1, D Rice 0-1.	Referee: N Wall (Carrigaline)

=== Round 3 ===
21 July 2013 Round 3	Dohenys	1-14 - 1-08	St. Nicholas'	Ahamilla Grounds, Clonakilty
	A Sheehan 1-4, M Quinn 0-3, M Murphy 0-1, T Collins 0-1, P Collins 0-1, S Collins 0-1, J McCarthy 0-1, P McCarthy 0-1, K O'Connell 0-1.		B O'Donovan 0-4, R Brosnan 0-4, P O'Brien 1-0.	Referee: J Bermingham (Bride Rovers)

21 July 2013 Round 3	Newmarket	0-05 - 1-08	St. Vincent's	Mallow GAA Complex, Mallow
	J Ryan 0-3, D Collins 0-1, T O'Keeffe 0-1.		K Lynch 1-3, A Harte 0-1, T O'Connell 0-1, S Duggan 0-1, J Buckley 0-1, F Murphy 0-1.	Referee: N Wall (Carrigaline)

=== Relegation playoff ===
21 September 2013 Playoff	St. Nicholas'	2-12 - 1-09	Newmarket	Mallow GAA Complex, Mallow
	B O'Donovan 1-3, D Brosnan 1-0, E Kearney 0-3, K McHenry 0-3, D Cunningham 0-1, P O'Brien 0-1, A O'Brien 0-1.		T O'Keeffe 1-0, J Ryan 0-3, D Culloty 0-2, D Hannon 0-1, J Lane 0-1, K O'Sullivan 0-1, T J Brosnan 0-1.	Referee: P O'Leary (Kilmurry)

=== Round 4 ===
8 August 2013 Round 4	Carbery Rangers	1-14 - 1-09	St. Finbarr's	Charlie Hurley Park, Bandon
	J Hayes 0-8, S O'Neill 1-0, J O'Rourke 0-2, S Hayes 0-1, T O'Rourke 0-1, K Fitzpatrick 0-1, A Jennings 0-1.		J Sexton 1-4, I Maguire 0-2, E McGreevey 0-2, J O'Donoghue 0-1.	Referee: J Bermingham (Bride Rovers)

9 August 2013 Round 4	Ballincollig	0-12 - 2-17	Carbery	Cloughduv
	G Durrant 0-4, L Prendergast 0-1, JP Murphy 0-1, J Miskella 0-1, D Tobin 0-1, C Dorgan 0-1, C O'Sullivan 0-1, D Bowen 0-1, I Coughlan 0-1.		S O'Mahony 1-3, D Barron 1-3, B O'Driscoll 0-2, T Downey 0-2, M Sugrue 0-2, C O'Driscoll 0-2, K Harrington 0-1, A O'Connor 0-1, J Wall 0-1.	Referee: B Coniry (Crosshaven)

9 August 2013 Round 4	Douglas	2-08 - 2-08	Dohenys	Castle Grounds, Macroom
	C O'Brien 1-1, M Harrington 0-4, O Mulrooney 1-0, S McCarthy 0-2, A Cadogan 0-1.		A Sheehan 1-1, B O'Donovan 1-0, M Quinn 0-3, D O'Donovan 0-1, P Collins 0-1, D Healy 0-1, J O'Connell 0-1.	Referee: D Farrell (Mitchelstown)

10 August 2013 Round 4	Ilen Rovers	1-10 - 3-14	Aghada	Páirc Liam Mhic Cárthaigh, Ballygarvan
	D Mac Eoin 1-5, J Bushe 0-3, M Hellen 0-1, K O'Sullivan 0-1.		R Kennedy 2-2, P O'Neill 0-5, J O'Shea 1-1, C Fleming 0-4, R Savage 0-1, J Connolly 0-1.	Referee: B Coniry (Crosshaven)

10 August 2013 Round 4	Castlehaven	0-13 - 0-11	Newcestown	Castletown-Kinneigh
	B Hurley 0-9, S Hurley 0-2, M Collins 0-1, S Nolan 0-1.		H Curran 0-3, D Twomey 0-2, M McSweeney 0-2, T Twomey 0-1, S Ryan 0-1, J Desmond 0-1, C O'Neill 0-1.	Referee: K Murphy (Nemo Rangers)

10 August 2013 Round 4	Clonakilty	0-12 - 1-11	St. Vincent's	Castle Grounds, Macroom
	C O'Donovan 0-3, J Leahy 0-2, J O'Mahony 0-2, E McCarthy 0-2, G Murray 0-2, D O'Regan 0-1.		S Duggan 1-1, G Kelleher 0-4, A Harte 0-2, J Buckley 0-1, T O'Connell 0-1, S Ray 0-1, D O'Connor 0-1.	Referee: N Wall (Carrigaline)

10 August 2013 Round 4	O'Donovan Rossa	2-07 - 2-13	Nemo Rangers	Sam Maguire Park, Dunmanway
	C Crowley 2-0, K Davis 0-3, T Hegarty 0-3, P Crowley 0-1.		A Morgan 1-3, B O'Driscoll 1-1, P Kerrigan 0-4, W Morgan 0-3, D Mehigan 0-1, A Cronin Snr 0-1.	Referee: P O'Leary (Kilmurry)

18 August 2013 Round 4	Bishopstown	4-11 - 1-09	Cork Institute of Technology	Páirc Uí Rinn, Cork
	D Crowley 2-1, C Dorman 2-0, D O'Donovan 0-4, S Oakes 0-3, B O'Callaghan 0-2, D Hickey 0-1.		C Vaughan 1-5, P O'Connor 0-2, J Walsh 0-1, C Sheehan 0-1.	Referee: M Collins (Clonakilty)

25 August 2013 Round 4 replay	Dohenys	3-07 - 1-14	Douglas	Castle Grounds, Macroom
	D O'Donovan 2-0, S Collins 1-0, M Quinn 0-3, A Sheehan 0-2, J O'Connell 0-2.		A Cadogan 0-5, K Murphy 1-1, M Harrington 0-4, O Mulrooney 0-2, J Collins 0-1, D Hanrahan 0-1.	Referee: C Lane (Banteer)

=== Quarter-finals ===
1 September 2013 Quarter-final	Castlehaven	2-14 - 1-10	St. Vincent's	Ahamilla Grounds, Clonakilty
	B Hurley 1-6, M Collins 1-3, S Cahalane 0-1, S Nolan 0-1, M Hurley 0-1, D Cahalane 0-1, D Hegarty 0-1.		S Duggan 1-0, K Lynch 0-3, J Buckley 0-2, C Barry 0-2, G Kelleher 0-2, A Harte 0-1.	Referee: J Bermingham (Bride Rovers)

1 September 2013 Quarter-final	Bishopstown	5-10 - 0-14	Carbery Rangers	Coachford Pitch, Coachford
	S Oakes 3-0, D Crowley 2-1, D O'Donovan 0-3, B O'Callaghan 0-2, F Ó Deasmhúnaigh 0-2, P Honohan 0-1, C Dorman 0-1.		J Hayes 0-6, T O'Rourke 0-3, D Hayes 0-2, K McMahon 0-1, J O'Rourke 0-1, S Hayes 0-1.	Referee: P O'Leary (Kilmurry)

1 September 2013 Quarter-final	Aghada	0-08 - 1-10	Carbery	Páirc Uí Rinn, Cork
	C FLeming 0-6, K O'Connor 0-1, J Connolly 0-1.		C O'Driscoll 0-4, P Kirby 1-0, D Barron 0-2, A O'Connor 0-2, R Deane 0-1, G Canty 0-1.	Referee: C Lane (Banteer)

6 September 2019 Quarter-final	Douglas	1-07 - 0-12	Nemo Rangers	Páirc Uí Rinn, Cork
	M Harrington 0-5, S McCarthy 1-0, A Cadogan 0-2.		B O'Driscoll 0-5, P Kerrigan 0-3, A Morgan 0-2, L Connolly 0-1, J Masters 0-1.	Referee: C Lane (Banteer)

=== Semi-finals ===
15 September 2013 Semi-final	Castlehaven	1-14 - 2-10	Carbery	Páirc Uí Chaoimh, Cork
	B Hurley 0-7 (0-4 fs); S Nolan 1-1; D Cahalane (0-1 45) 0-3; Stephen Hurley, S Cahalane, D Limrick 0-1 each.	Report	D Barron 0-6 (0-4 fs); R Deane and M Cahalane 1-0 each; B O’Driscoll 0-2 (0-1 45); S O’Mahony and M Sugrue 0-1 each.	Referee: C Murphy (Nemo Rangers)

15 September 2013 Semi-final	Bishopstown	1-08 - 1-12	Nemo Rangers	Páirc Uí Chaoimh, Cork
	D O’Donovan 0-5 (0-3 fs); D Crowley 1-0; B O’Callaghan, F Desmond and D Hickey 0-1 each.	Report	P Kerrigan and B O’Driscoll (fs) 0-4 each, A Morgan 1-1; L Connolly 0-3.

=== Final ===
13 October 2013 Final	Castlehaven	0-16 - 1-11	Nemo Rangers	Páirc Uí Chaoimh, Cork
	B Hurley 0-12 (7 frees); R Whelton, S Nolan, S Hurley, S Cahalane 0-1 each.	Report	P Kerrigan 0-5 (3 frees, 1 45); J Masters 0-4 (1 free); A Cronin 1-0; B O’Driscoll 0-2.	Referee: C Lane (Banteer)

== Championship statistics ==
=== Top scorers ===
Top scorers overall

Rank	Player	Club	Tally	Total	Matches	Average
1	Brian Hurley	Castlehaven	3-47	56	6	9.33
2	Declan Barron	Carbery	2-22	28	6	4.66
3	Paul Kerrigan	Nemo Rangers	1-20	23	6	3.83
4	Mark Harrington	Douglas	1-18	21	5	4.20
5	Barry O'Driscoll	Nemo Rangers	1-17	20	7	2.85
5	John Hayes	Carbery Rangers	0-20	20	3	6.66
6	Daniel O'Donovan	Castlehaven	0-19	19	5	3.80
7	Denis Crowley	Bishopstown	5-03	18	5	3.60
7	Alan Sheehan	Dohenys	3-09	18	5	3.60
7	Cathal Vaughan	CIT	1-15	18	3	6.00

Top scorers in a single game

Rank	Player	Club	Tally	Total	Opposition
1	Brian Hurley	Castlehaven	0-12	12	Nemo Rangers
2	Brian Hurley	Castlehaven	2-05	11	Nemo Rangers
3	Donal Óg Hodnett	O'Donovan Rossa	0-10	10	Dohenys
4	Sam Oakes	Bishopstown	3-00	9	Carnery Rangers
4	David Harrington	Beara	2-03	9	Carbery
4	Brian Hurley	Castlehaven	1-06	9	St. Vincent's
4	Brian Hurley	Castlehaven	0-09	9	Newcestown
5	Ronan Kennedy	Aghada	2-02	8	Ilen Rovers
5	Dan Mac Eoin	Ilen Rovers	1-05	8	Aghada
5	Cathal Vaughan	CIT	1-05	8	Bishopstown
5	John Hayes	Carbery Rangers	0-08	8	St. Finbarr's
5	Brian Hurley	Castlehaven	0-08	8	Nemo Rangers

== Miscellaneous ==
- [[Castlehaven GAA|Castlehaven]] win back to back titles for the first time.
