= Luke Connolly =

Irish Gaelic footballer

Personal information
- Native name: Lúcas Ó Conghaile (Irish)
- Born: 2 November 1992 (age 33) Cork, Ireland
- Height: 5 ft 11 in (180 cm)

Sport
- Sport: Gaelic Football
- Position: Right corner-forward
Club*
Years	Club	Apps (scores)
2011-2024	Nemo Rangers	71 (33-255)
Club titles
- Cork titles: 5
- Munster titles: 2
- All-Ireland Titles: 0
College
- Years: College
- 2011-2016: University College Cork
College titles
- Sigerson titles: 1
Inter-county**
Years	County	Apps (scores)
2015-2021	Cork	17 (8-44)
Inter-county titles
- Munster titles: 0
- All-Irelands: 0
- NFL: 0
- All Stars: 0
- * club appearances and scores correct as of 22:14, 27 September 2021. **Inter County team apps and scores correct as of 17:48, 16 January 2024.

Luke Connolly (born 2 November 1992) is an Irish former Gaelic footballer. He played for club side nemo Rangers and was a member of the Cork senior football team from 2015 to 2021. Connolly usually lined out as a forward.

== Playing career ==
=== Coláiste Chríost Rí ===
Connolly first came to football prominence as a student in Coláiste Chríost Rí in Cork. In his final year with the school he won a Corn Uí Mhuirí medal after a "prolific" performance at full-forward in a 1-12 to 1-07 win over Pobalscoil Chorca Dhuibhne in the final.

=== University College Cork ===
During his studies at University College Cork, Connolly was selected for the college's senior football team. On 22 February 2014, he won a Sigerson Cup medal after lining out at centre-forward in the 0-10 to 0-09 win over Ulster University in the final.

=== Nemo Rangers ===
Connolly joined the nemo Rangers club at a young age and played in all grades at juvenile and underage levels. He first enjoyed success with the club's under-21 team, claiming a Cork County U21AFC after top-scoring with 1-04 in the 2-13 to 0-05 win over Bantry Blues in the 2012 final. By this stage Connolly had already joined the Nemo Rangers senior team, having made his debut in a 0-12 to 1-07 win over Ballincollig in the first round of the 2011 Cork County Championship.

On 25 October 2015, Connolly won his first County Senior Championship medal after lining out at full-forward in the 1-10 to 0-11 defeat of Castlehaven in the final replay. He again lined out in the forwards when Nemo suffered a 1-07 to 0-09 defeat by Clonmel Commercials in the 2015 Munster club final.

Connolly won a second county championship winners' medal after scoring 1-01 from right corner-forward in the 4-12 to 3-13 win over St. Finbarr's in the 2017 county final. He later claimed his first Munster Club Championship medal after top-scoring with ten points in the 0-16 to 0-11 defeat of Dr. Crokes in the 2017 Munster club final. On 17 March 2018, Connolly again top scored for Nemo when they suffered a 2-19 to 0-10 defeat by Corofin in the 2018 All-Ireland club final.

On 27 October 2019, Connolly claimed a third county championship winners' medal after a 2-08 to 0-10 win over Duhallow in the county final. He later won a second Munster Club Championship medal after top-scoring for Nemo in the 0-15 to 0-06 win over Clonmel Commercials in the 2019 Munster club final.

=== Cork ===
Connolly first played for Cork when he was added to the minor panel in advance of the 2010 Munster Minor Championship. After winning a Munster Minor Championship medal as a non-playing substitute after a 1-08 to 1-07 win over Kerry, Connolly made his only appearance in the grade when he came on as a substitute in the 1-13 to 1-12 defeat by Tyrone in the 2010 All-Ireland minor final.

After progressing onto the Cork under-21, Connolly won a Munster Championship title in that grade after a 2-14 to 1-17 extra-time defeat of Kerry in the 2012 Munster under-21 final. He collected a second successive provincial winners' medal after a 1-17 to 0-09 win over Tipperary in the 2013 decider. On 14 May 2013, Connolly was held scoreless from left corner-forward when Cork suffered a 1-14 to 1-11 defeat by Galway in the 2013 All-Ireland under-21 final.

Connolly was added to the Cork senior training panel prior to the start of the 2015 National League. He made his first appearance for the team on 1 February 2015 when he came on as a 66th-minute substitute for Colm O'Driscoll in a 1-15 to 0-16 win over Dublin.

On 2 July 2017, Connolly made his first Munster final appearance when he was selected at full-forward against Kerry. He scored two points, including one from a free, but ended the game on the losing side after a 1-23 to 0-15 defeat.

== Career statistics ==
=== Club ===
Team	Season	Cork		Munster		All-Ireland		Total	
Team	Season	Apps	Score	Apps	Score	Apps	Score	Apps	Score
Nemo Rangers	2011-12	3	0-03	—		—		3	0-03
Nemo Rangers	2012-13	4	2-18	—		—		4	2-18
Nemo Rangers	2013-14	6	1-13	—		—		6	1-13
Nemo Rangers	2014-15	3	1-07	—		—		3	1-07
Nemo Rangers	2015-16	5	0-13	2	0-05	—		7	0-18
Nemo Rangers	2016-17	5	3-21	—		—		5	3-21
Nemo Rangers	2017-18	7	4-30	2	1-13	2	2-11	11	7-54
Nemo Rangers	2018-19	3	2-18	—		—		3	2-18
Nemo Rangers	2019-20	4	2-15	3	0-13	1	0-02	8	2-30
Nemo Rangers	2020-21	6	7-22	—		—		6	7-22
Nemo Rangers	2021-22	3	2-10	—		—		3	2-10
Nemo Rangers	2022-23	6	4-24	1	0-06	—		7	4-30
Nemo Rangers	2023-24	5	2-11	—		—		5	2-11
Career total		60	30-205	8	1-37	3	2-13	71	33-255

=== Inter-county ===
Team	Year	National League			Munster		All-Ireland		Total	
Team	Year	Division	Apps	Score	Apps	Score	Apps	Score	Apps	Score
Cork	2015	Division 1	1	0-00	0	0-00	0	0-00	1	0-00
Cork	2016	Division 1	6	1-10	0	0-00	1	0-01	7	1-11
Cork	2017	Division 2	4	1-06	2	1-04	1	1-01	7	3-11
Cork	2018	Division 2	0	0-00	2	1-12	1	0-09	3	1-21
Cork	2019	Division 2	6	0-18	2	2-00	4	3-09	12	5-27
Cork	2020	Division 3	4	2-10	2	0-07	—		6	2-17
Cork	2021	Division 2	3	1-09	2	0-01	—		5	1-10
Total			24	5-53	10	4-24	7	4-20	41	13-97

== Honours ==
Coláiste Chríost Rí

- Corn Uí Mhuirí: 2011

University College Cork

- Sigerson Cup: 2014

Nemo Rangers

- Munster Senior Club Football Championship: 2017, 2019
- Cork Premier Senior Football Championship: 2015, 2017, 2019, 2020

Cork

- National Football League Division 3: 2020
- Munster Under-21 Football Championship: 2012, 2013
- Munster Minor Football Championship: 2010
