= Conor Cahalane =

Irish hurler and Gaelic footballer

Personal information
- Born: 1997 (age 28–29) Wilton, Cork, Ireland
- Height: 6 ft 1 in (185 cm)

Sport
- Sport: Hurling
- Position: Midfield
Clubs
- Years: Club
- St Finbarr's; Castlehaven
Club titles
	Football	Hurling
Cork titles	0	1
College
- Years: College
- University College Cork
College titles
- Fitzgibbon titles: 1
Inter-county*
Years	County	Apps (scores)
2018-present	Cork	3 (0-01)
Inter-county titles
- Munster titles: 0
- All-Irelands: 0
- NHL: 0
- All Stars: 0
- *Inter County team apps and scores correct as of 21:52, 31 July 2021.

Conor Cahalane (born 1997) is an Irish hurler and Gaelic footballer who plays as a midfielder for club sides St Finbarr's and Castlehaven and at senior inter-county level with the Cork county team.

== Playing career ==
=== Cork ===
==== Minor and under-21 ====
Cahalane first played for Cork as a member of the minor team during the 2014 Munster Championship. He was a member of the extended panel for Cork's unsuccessful championship campaign.

Cahalane was eligible for the minor grade again in 2015 and was promoted to the match-day panel. He was an unused substitute throughout the championship campaign.

Cahalene was drafted onto the Cork under-21 team in advance of the 2017 Munster Championship. He had his first involvement with the team on 13 July 2017 when he was an unused substitute in Cork's 2–17 to 1–19 defeat of Waterford.

On 20 June 2018, Cahalane made his first appearance for the Cork under-21 team when he was introduced as a 44th-minute substitute for Chris O'Leary in a 0–23 to 1–17 defeat of Waterford. On 4 July 2018, Cahalane won a Munster Championship medal after coming on as a 22nd-minute substitute for Darragh Fitzgibbon in Cork's 2–23 to 1–13 defeat of Tipperary in the final. On 26 August 2018, he lined out at midfield when Cork faced Tipperary in the All-Ireland final. Cahalane top scored with 1-03 from play but ended on the losing side following a 3–13 to 1–16 defeat in what was his last game in the grade.

==== Senior ====
Cahalane made his first appearance for the Cork senior hurling team on 14 January 2018. He lined out at midfield in a 1–23 to 1–13 defeat by Kerry in the pres-season Munster League. Cahalane was later omitted from the Cork panel for the National League.

On 27 January 2019, Cahalane made his first National League appearance. He lined out at midfield in a 2–18 to 0–17 defeat by Kilkenny in the opening round.

== Early life ==
Cahalane was born in Wilton, Cork. His father, Niall Cahalane, and his uncle, John Cleary, won All-Ireland medals as members of the Cork senior football team in 1989 and 1990. His aunt, Nollaig Cleary, won nine All-Ireland medals with Cork. His brother, Damien Cahalane, has also played for Cork.

== Career statistics ==
As of 31 July 2021.

Team	Year	National League			Munster		All-Ireland		Total	
Team	Year	Division	Apps	Score	Apps	Score	Apps	Score	Apps	Score
Cork	2018	Division 1A	0	0-00	0	0-00	0	0-00	0	0-00
Cork	2019	Division 1A	3	0-00	0	0-00	0	0-00	3	0-00
Cork	2020	Division 1A	2	0-00	0	0-00	0	0-00	2	0-00
Cork	2021	Division 1A	5	1-05	1	0-00	2	0-01	8	1-06
Career total			10	1-05	1	0-00	2	0-01	13	1-06

== Honours ==
St. Finbarr's

- Cork Premier Senior Hurling Championship: 2022

Cork

- Munster Under-21 Hurling Championship : 2018
