= 2012 Cork Senior Football Championship =

Gaelic football competition

- Dates: 20 March 2012 – 28 October 2012
- Teams: 25
- Sponsor: Evening Echo
- Champions: Castlehaven (4th title); Seán Cahalane (captain); James McCarthy (manager)
- Runners-up: Duhallow; Aidan Walsh (captain); Ned English (manager)
- Relegated: Na Piarsaigh

Tournament statistics
- Matches played: 45
- Top scorer(s): Donnacha O'Connor (0-48)

The 2012 Cork Senior Football Championship was the 114th staging of the Cork Senior Football Championship since its establishment by the Cork County Board in 1887. The championship began on 20 March 2012 and ended on 28 October 2012.

University College Cork entered the championship as the defending champions, however, they were defeated by Duhallow.

On 28 October 2012, Castlehaven won the championship following a 1-07 to 0-09 defeat of Duhallow in the final. This was their 4th championship title overall and their first title since 2003.

Duhallow's Donnacha O'Connor was the championship's top scorer with 0-48.

== Team changes ==
=== To Championship ===
Promoted from the Cork Premier Intermediate Football Championship

- Newmarket

=== From Championship ===
Relegated to the Cork Premier Intermediate Football Championship

- Valley Rovers

== Results ==
=== Divisional section ===
20 March 2012 Round 1	Avondhu	0-09 - 1-09	Cork Institute of Technology	Fitzgerald Park, Fermoy
	C O'Neill 0-3, T O'Shea 0-2, P Kissane 0-1, E O'Connor 0-1, M Sheehan 0-1, C O'Riordan 0-1.		K Hallissey 1-0, J Dineen 0-2, J Walsh 0-2, D Leahy 0-2, B O'Sullivan 0-1, P Joy 0-1, D Daly 0-1.	Referee: G Sweeney (Glenville)

20 March 2012 Round 1	Beara	2-10 - 0-13	Duhallow	Sam Maguire Park, Dunmanway
	KJ O'Sullivan 0-7, TJ O'Sullivan 1-1, BJ O'Sullivan 1-0, BT O'Sullivan 0-1, D Harrington 0-1.		D O'Connor 0-5, B Dennehy 0-2, N Fleming 0-2, J Cott 0-1, M Dilworth 0-1, A Walsh 0-1, E Ellis 0-1.	Referee: M Collins (Clonakilty)

20 March 2012 Round 1	Imokilly	0-05 - 1-20	Muskerry	Páirc Uí Rinn, Cork
	S Long 0-2, M Cussen 0-1, K O'Brien 0-1, C Cummins 0-1.		F Goold 0-8, S Kelleher 1-2, L Shorten 0-3, M O'Connor 0-3, P Lynch 0-2, D Ring 0-1, A O'Connor 0-1.	Referee: J Dorgan (Nemo Rangers)

29 March 2012 Round 1	University College Cork	0-22 - 1-10	Seandún	Páirc Uí Rinn, Cork
	E Buckley 0-5, S Beston 0-5, P Geaney 0-4, A Greaney 0-3, G Ryan 0-2, B Coughlan 0-1, S Enright 0-1, F O'Connor 0-1.		E Buckley 0-4, T Hornibrook 1-0, P Condon 0-2, S Howard 0-1, S O'Sullivan 0-1, C Buckley 0-1, T O'Connell 0-1.	Referee: N Barrett (Carrigtwohill)

3 April 2012 Round 2	Carbery	0-11 - 0-12	Avondhu	Cloughduv
	D Barron 0-3, A O'Connor 0-2, B O'Driscoll 0-2, K Harrington 0-1, K O'Driscoll 0-1, D O'Sullivan 0-1, M Sugrue 0-1.		C O'Neill 0-5, C O'Riordan 0-3, T O'Shea 0-2, P Kissane 0-1, D O'Mahony 0-1.	Referee: P O'Leary (Kilmurry)

17 April 2012 Round 3	Duhallow	2-10 - 1-09	University College Cork	Mallow GAA Complex, Mallow
	J Cott 1-3, D O'Connor 0-5, K Holland 1-0, N Fleming 0-1, D Moynihan 0-1.		S Cox 0-5, S Beston 1-0, E Buckley 0-2, D O'Sullivan 0-1, S O'Brien 0-1.	Referee: N Barrett (Carrigtwohill)

17 April 2012 Round 3	Seandún	1-13 - 2-11	Beara	Charlie Hurley Park, Bandon
	E Buckley 0-7, T Hornibrook 1-0, C Buckley 0-2, D O'Connor 0-1, K Brosnan 0-1, M Kelleher 0-1, S Buckley 0-1.		KJ O'Sullivan 0-5, C Harrington 1-1, BJ O'Sullivan 1-0, A O'Sullivan 0-2, T Collins 0-1, J Goggins 0-1, S O'Sullivan 0-1.	Referee: E Sheehy (Newcestown)

17 April 2012 Round 3	Muskerry	0-05 - 0-09	Avondhu	Riverstown Sportsfield, Sallybrook
	D Goulding 0-2, L Searten 0-1, F Goold 0-1, P Lynch 0-1.		T O'Shea 0-4, C O'Neill 0-3, C O'Riordan 0-1, D O'Mahony 0-1.	Referee: J Bermingham (Clyda Rovers)

8 May 2012 Round 3	Carbery	2-15 - 0-11	Cork Institute of Technology	Cloughduv
	D Barron 1-6, D o'Sullivan 1-0, K O'Driscoll 0-2, C O'Driscoll 0-2, K Harrington 0-1, A O'Connor 0-1, M Delaney 0-1, R Deane 0-1, M Sugrue 0-1.		K Hallissey 0-4, J O'Connor 0-3, J Walsh 0-2, P Daly 0-1, J Daly 0-1.	Referee: J Dorgan (Nemo Rangers)

16 June 2012 Round 4	Carbery	1-08 - 2-11 (aet)	Duhallow	Coachford Pitch, Coachford
	M Sugrue 1-1, K O'Driscoll 0-2, G Canty 0-1, C O'Driscoll 0-1, N Canty 0-1, R Deane 0-1, S Levis 0-1.		D O'Connor 0-5, N Fleming 1-0, K Crowley 1-0, A Walsh 0-2, B O'Callaghan 0-1, B Dennehy 0-1, K Holland 0-1, D Moynihan 0-1.	Referee: N Barrett (Carrigtwohill)

23 June 2012 Round 4	Avondhu	1-12 - 0-09	Beara	Páirc Naomh Eoin, Newcestown
	C O'Neill 0-6, V O'Donoghue 1-0, T O'Shea 0-3, C O'Riordan 0-2, M Sheehan 0-1.		K Goggin 0-3, BJ O'Sullivan 0-3, D Harrington 0-2, S O'Sullivan 0-1.	Referee: B Coniry (Crosshaven)

=== Round 1 ===
5 May 2012 Round 1	Ilen Rovers	0-05 - 1-15	Ballincollig	Sam Maguire Park, Dunmanway
	D Mac Eoin 0-4, K O'Sullivan 0-1.		C O'Sullivan 0-5, S Kiely 1-1, P Kelly 0-2, J Kelly 0-2, K Hickey 0-2, B Glavin 0-2, B Kelly 0-1.	Referee: J Dorgan (Nemo Rangers)

5 May 2012 Round 1	Newmarket	0-06 - 0-17	St. Finbarr's	Mallow GAA Complex, Mallow
	TJ Bodie 0-3, SF O'Connor 0-1, J Lane 0-1, K O'Sullivan 0-1.		C Madden 0-4, E Finn 0-3, R O'Mahony 0-3, P Murphy 0-3, I Leahy 0-2, P Wiley 0-1, G O'Connor 0-1.	Referee: P O'Leary (Kilmurry)

6 May 2012 Round 1	Carbery Rangers	1-14 - 1-07	Clonakilty	Sam Maguire Park, Dunmanway
	J Hayes 0-7, S Hayes 1-0, J Fitzpatrick 0-3, T O'Rourke 0-2, B Shanahan 0-1, K McMahon 0-1.		C McManus 1-1, C O'Donovan 0-2, L Lyons 0-1, P Griffin 0-1, M O'Brien 0-1, D O'Regan 0-1.	Referee: C Lane (Banteer)

7 May 2012 Round 1	Bishopstown	1-12 - 1-12 (aet)	Nemo Rangers	Páirc Uí Rinn, Cork
	D Crowley 1-3, D O'Donovan 0-5, F Ó Deasmhúnaigh 0-2, J O'Shea 0-1, K O'Halloran 0-1.		B O'Driscoll 1-4, L Connolly 0-4, J Masters 0-2, P Kerrigan 0-1, M Dorgan 0-1.	Referee: C Lane (Banteer)

7 May 2012 Round 1	Castlehaven	0-12 - 0-09	Aghada	Páirc Naomh Eoin, Newcestown
	M Collins 0-5, S Hurley 0-3, D Burns 0-1, S Cahalane 0-1, C Hayes 0-1, D Cahalane 0-1.		C Fleming 0-6, J O'Shea 0-2, S Wall 0-1.

9 May 2012 Round 1	Na Piarsaigh	3-02 - 0-22	Douglas	Páirc Uí Rinn, Cork
	A Keating 1-2, J Gardiner 1-0, S Duggan 1-0.		M Harrington 0-10, S McCarthy 0-5, K Murphy 0-3, E Cotter 0-2, O Mulrooney 0-1, A Cadogan 0-1.	Referee: J Bermingham (Bride Rovers)

12 May 2012 Round 1	O'Donovan Rossa	3-11 - 1-11	Dohenys	Ahamilla Grounds, Clonakilty
	D Óg Hodnett 1-3, C McCarthy 1-2, C Crowley 1-1, K Davis 0-2, S Carmody 0-1, R McCarthy 0-1, P Gilmore 0-1.		D Healy 1-0, S Collins 0-3, A Sheehan 0-2, M Quinn 0-2, P Collins 0-1, D O'Sullivan 0-1, M Milner 0-1, N Collins 0-1.	Referee: P O'Leary (Kilmurry)

12 May 2012 Round 1	St. Nicholas'	0-05 - 2-09	Newcestown	Brinny Sportsfield, Brinny
	E Kearney 0-3, K McEnery 0-1, R Brosnan 0-1.		T Twomey 1-2, B Horgan 0-5, Mark Kelly 1-0, T Ryan 0-1, E Kelly 0-1.	Referee: J Bermingham (Bride Rovers)

12 May 2012 Round 1 replay	Nemo Rangers	3-20 - 4-18 (aet)	Bishopstown	Páirc Uí Rinn, Cork
	L Connolly 1-6, B O'Driscoll 1-3, A Cronin Snr 1-2, P Kerrigan 0-3, D Mehigan 0-2, A Cronin Jnr 0-2, M Dorgan 0-1, W Morgan 0-1.		D Crowley 3-1, D O'Donovan 0-7, F Ó Deasmhúnaigh 0-7, C Dorman 1-1, A O'Connor 0-1, D Hickey 0-1.	Referee: M Collins (Clonakilty)

=== Round 2 ===
9 June 2012 Round 2	Clonakilty	1-15 - 1-12	St. Nicholas'	Brinny Sportsfield, Brinny
	J Leahy 0-8, M O'Brien 1-1, D O'Regan 0-2, H Kenny 0-1, P Griffin 0-1, D Murphy 0-1, C O'Donovan 0-1.		B O'Donovan 0-4, A O'Brien 1-0, R Brosnan 0-3, G Moylan 0-2, G Callanan 0-1, Dean Brosnan 0-1, S Kennefick 0-1.	Referee: P O'Leary (Kilmurry)

23 June 2012 Round 2	Aghada	0-08 - 0-10	Newmarket	Killavullen
	G Melvin 0-2, T O'Keeffe 0-2, M Russell 0-1, J O'Shea 0-1, G Hurley 0-1, T Wall 0-1.		TJ Bodie 0-4, J Lane 0-2, D O'Flynn 0-2, K O'Sullivan 0-1, N Flanagan 0-1.	Referee: K Murphy (Nemo Rangers)

25 June 2012 Round 2	Dohenys	1-14 - 1-09	Ilen Rovers	Rossa Park, Skibbereen
	M Quinn 1-6, A Sheehan 0-4, D O'Donovan 0-2, J O'Connell 0-1, D Healy 0-1.		D Mac Eoin 0-4, M Hellen 1-0, K O'Sullivan 0-2, A Holland 0-1, D O'Sullivan 0-1, C O'Driscoll 0-1.	Referee: J Dorgan (Nemo Rangers)

26 June 2012 Round 2	Na Piarsaigh	3-09 - 2-20	Nemo Rangers	Páirc Uí Rinn, Cork
	J Gardiner 1-7, S Glasgow 1-1, P Gould 1-1.		L Connolly 1-5, J Masters 1-3, A Cronin Snr 0-3, B O'Driscoll 0-3, P Kerrigan 0-2, W Morgan 0-2, D Mehigan 0-1, D Niblock 0-1.	Referee: P O'Leary (Kilmurry)

=== Round 3 ===
14 July 2012 Round 3	Aghada	1-11 - 0-11	St. Nicholas'	Páirc Uí Chonaill, Cobh
	T O'Keeffe 1-1, C Fleming 0-4, M Russell 0-2, K O'Connor 0-1, R Power 0-1, G Melvin 0-1, J Connolly 0-1.		B O'Donovan 0-4, A O'Brien 0-4, D Goggin 0-2, D Brosnan 0-1.	Referee: M Collins (Clonakilty)

17 July 2012 Round 2	Ilen Rovers	1-12 - 2-05	Na Piarsaigh	Charlie Hurley Park, Bandon
	K O'Sullivan 1-3, J Bushe 0-2, K Daly 0-2, Conor O'Driscoll 0-2, Cian O'Driscoll 0-1, D Mac Eoin 0-1, A Holland 0-1.		P Gould 1-0, S Glasgow 1-0, A Hogan 0-3, J Gardiner 0-2.	Referee: P O'Leary (Kilmurry)

=== Relegation playoff ===
6 October 2012 Playoff	St. Nicholas'	1-09 - 0-10	Na Piarsaigh	Páirc Uí Rinn, Cork
	B O'Donovan 1-3, K McEnery 0-2, David Brosnan 0-2, G Callanan 0-1, Dean Brosnan 0-1.		J Gardiner 0-2, A Keating 0-2, S Glasgow 0-2, C Joyce 0-1, C O'Mahony 0-1, A Hogan 0-1, G Joyce 0-1.	Referee: M Collins (Clonakilty)

=== Round 4 ===
10 August 2012 Round 4	Carbery Rangers	2-09 - 0-10	Ballincollig	Charlie Hurley Park, Bandon
	J Hayes 2-3, J O'Rourke 0-2, J Fitzpatrick 0-1, D Hayes 0-1, K McMahon 0-1, S O'Neill 0-1.		B Glavin 0-6, S Kiely 0-2, J Kelly 0-1, P Kelly 0-1.	Referee: J Dorgan (Nemo Rangers)

11 August 2012 Round 4	Aghada	0-08 - 1-08	O'Donovan Rossa	Brinny Sportsfield, Brinny
	C O'Driscoll 0-2, J Crowley 0-2, G Melvin 0-1, C Fleming 0-1, M Russell 0-1, J O'Shea 0-1.		K Davis 1-3, C Crowley 0-1, D Óg Hodnett 0-1, D Hazel 0-1, E Hodnett 0-1, S O'Brien 0-1.	Referee: P O'Leary (Kilmurry)

11 August 2012 Round 4	Avondhu	1-12 - 0-12	Ilen Rovers	Castle Grounds, Macroom
	C O'Neill 0-5, T O'Shea 1-0, M Sheehan 0-3, C O'Riordan 0-3, T Monaghan 0-1.		K O'Sullivan 0-3, K Daly 0-2, A Holland 0-2, D Mac Eoin 0-2, Cian O'Driscoll 0-1, T O'Regan 0-1, B O'Driscoll 0-1.¥	Referee: N Wall (Carrigaline)

11 August 2012 Round 4	St. Finbarr's	2-09 - 0-11	Nemo Rangers	Páirc Uí Rinn, Cork
	J Sexton 2-4, I Leahy 0-3, R O'Mahony 0-1, J Burns 0-1.		B O'Driscoll 0-6, L Connolly 0-3, P Kerrigan 0-1, A Cronin 0-1.	Referee: M Collins (Clonakilty)

12 August 2012 Round 4	Duhallow	0-11 - 2-05	Dohenys	Coachford Pitch, Coachford
	D O'Connor 0-4, N Fleming 0-3, B Dennehy 0-1, D Gayer 0-1, A Walsh 0-1, M Dilworth 0-1.		D O'Donovan 1-0, M Milner 1-0, M Quinn 0-3, J McCarthy 0-1, J O'Connell 0-1.	Referee: P O'Leary (Kilmurry)

31 August 2012 Round 4	Castlehaven	1-08 - 1-06	Newcestown	Sam Maguire Park, Dunmanway
	M Collins 0-6, B Hurley 1-2.		S Ryan 1-0, J Desmond 0-3, H Curran 0-2, T Twomey 0-1.	Referee: K Murphy (Nemo Rangers)

8 September 2012 Round 4	Douglas	2-14 - 0-04	Newmarket	Mallow GAA Complex, Mallow
	S McCarthy 1-1, O Mulrooney 1-0, A Cadogan 0-3, K Murphy 0-3, M Harrington 0-3, F Desmond 0-3, C Hogan 0-1.		TJ Brodie 0-2, T O'Keeffe 0-1, J Lane 0-1.	Referee: E Sheehy (Newcestown)

15 September 2012 Round 4 replay	Dohenys	2-11 - 1-20	Duhallow	Coachford Pitch, Coachford
	J O'Connell 1-1, A Sheehan 1-1, D O'Donovan 0-3, M Quinn 0-3, S Collins 0-1, M Milner 0-1, K O'Connell 0-1.		D O'Connor 0-8, A Holland 1-0, J Cott 0-3, M Dilworth 0-2, A Walsh 0-2, J McLoughlin 0-1, D Moynihan 0-1, D Gayer 0-1, N Fleming 0-1, T Collins 0-1.	Referee: K Murphy (Nemo Rangers)

22 September 2012 Round 4	Bishopstown	4-07 - 1-07	Clonakilty	Páirc Naomh Eoin, Newcestown
	C Dorman 1-2, F Ó Deasmhúnaigh 1-0, D Crowley 1-0, C O'Neill 1-0, P Honohan 0-2, J O'Shea 0-1, D Hickey 0-1, A O'Connor 0-1.		H Kenny 1-0, J Leahy 0-3, C O'Donovan 0-2, P Griffin 0-1, C McManus 0-1.	Referee: J Bermingham (Bride Rovers)

=== Quarter-finals ===
16 September 2012 Quarter-final	Avondhu	1-09 - 1-13	O'Donovan Rossa	Castle Grounds, Macroom
	C O'Neill 1-5, C O'Riordan 0-2, T Monaghan 0-1, T O'Shea 0-1.		D Óg Hodnett 0-9, K Davis 1-1, E Hodnett 0-1, T Hegarty 0-1, P Nealon 0-1.	Referee: J Dorgan (Nemo Rangers)

16 September 2012 Quarter-final	St. Finbarr's	0-10 - 1-07	Castlehaven	Charlie Hurley Park, Bandon
	J Sexton 0-3, I Leahy 0-2, E Keane 0-2, R O'Mahony 0-2, C McCarthy 0-1.		M Collins 1-3, B Hurley 0-2, S Hurley 0-1, S Dineen 0-1.	Referee: C Lane (Banteer)

22 September 2012 Quarter-final replay	Castlehaven	0-12 - 0-09	St. Finbarr's	Charlie Hurley Park, Bandon
	M Collins 0-3, S Cahalane 0-2, S Hurley 0-2, M Cahalane 0-1, D Hurley 0-1, A Cahalane 0-1, B Hurley 0-1, S Nolan 0-1.		J Sexton 0-6, I Maguire 0-2, C Madden 0-1.	Referee: P O'Leary (Kilmurry)

23 September 2012 Quarter-final	Duhallow	0-12 - 0-12	Douglas	Mallow GAA Complex, Mallow
	D O'Connor 0-4, N Fleming 0-2, D Gayer 0-2, T Collins 0-1, N O'Sullivan 0-1, M Dilworth 0-1, A Walsh 0-1.		M Harrington 0-5, A Cadogan 0-4, F Desmond 0-1, B Fitzgerald 0-1, S McCarthy 0-1.	Referee: M Collins (Clonakilty)

30 September 2012 Quarter-final replay	Douglas	1-09 - 0-13	Duhallow	Mallow GAA Complex, Mallow
	A Cadogan 1-1, M Harrington 0-4, O Mulrooney 0-1, F Desmond 0-1, S McCarthy 0-1, B Fitzgerald 0-1.		D O'Connor 0-8, J Healy 0-1, A Walsh 0-1, N Fleming 0-1, T Collins 0-1, L McLoughlin 0-1.	Referee: J Bermingham (Bride Rovers)

13 October 2012 Quarter-final	Bishopstown	1-10 - 1-11	Carbery Rangers	Charlie Hurley Park, Bandon
	P O'Connor 0-5, P Honohan 1-1, C Dorman 0-1, D Hickey 0-1, F Ó Deasmhúnaigh 0-1, P Cronin 0-1.		D Hayes 1-2, J Hayes 0-5, S O'Neill 0-2, B Shanahan 0-1, J Fitzpatrick 0-1.	Referee: C Lane (Banteer)

=== Semi-finals ===
6 October 2012 Semi-final	Duhallow	0-13 - 0-07	O'Donovan Rossa	Páirc Uí Rinn, Cork
	D O’Connor (0-5), A Walsh (0-2); L McLoughlin (0-2), M Dilworth (0-2); T Collins (0-1), J Cott (0-1),	Report	D Óg Hodnett (0-2, one free), G Minihane (0-1), R Price (0-1, 45); K Davis (0-1), T Hegarty (0-1), D Shannon (0-1).	Referee: J Dorgan (Nemo Rangers)

20 October 2012 Semi-final	Castlehaven	2-09 - 0-09	Carbery Rangers	Páirc Uí Rinn, Cork
	B Hurley 1-6, S Cahalane 1-0, M Collins 0-3.		J Hayes 0-5, K McMahon 0-3, M Mennis 0-1.	Referee: K Murphy (Nemo Rangers)

=== Final ===
28 October 2012 Final	Castlehaven	1-07 - 0-09	Duhallow	Páirc Uí Chaoimh, Cork
	M Collins (0-3), S Nolan (1-0), B Hurley (0-2), D Cahalane (0-1 (free), S Cahalane (0-1).	Report	D O’Connor (0-4, two frees), P O’Leary, A Walsh, N Fleming, M Dilworth, J Cott (0-1 each).	Attendance: 6,170

== Championship statistics ==
=== Top scorers ===
Top scorers overall

Rank	Player	Club	Tally	Total	Matches	Average
1	Donncha O'Connor	Duhallow	0-48	48	9	5.33
2	Colm O'Neill	Avondhu	2-27	33	7	4.71
3	John Hayes	Duhallow	2-20	26	4	6.50
3	Mark Collins	Castlehaven	1-23	26	6	4.33
4	Luke Connolly	Nemo Rangers	2-18	24	4	6.00
5	Barry O'Driscoll	Nemo Rangers	2-16	22	4	5.50
5	Mark Harrington	Douglas	0-22	22	4	5.50
6	Denis Crowley	Bishopstown	5-04	19	4	4.75
6	Brian Hurley	Castlehaven	2-13	19	6	3.16
6	Jason Sexton	St. Finbarr's	2-13	19	3	6.66

Top scorers in a single game

Rank	Player	Club	Tally	Total	Opposition
1	Denis Crowley	Bishopstown	3-01	10	Nemo Rangers
1	Jason Sexton	St. Finbarr's	2-04	10	Nemo Rangers
1	John Gardiner	Na Piarsaigh	1-07	10	Nemo Rangers
1	Mark Harrington	Douglas	0-10	10	Na Piarsaigh
2	John Hayes	Carbery Rangers	2-03	9	Ballincollig
2	Declan Barron	Carbery	1-06	9	CIT
2	Luke Connolly	Nemo Rangers	1-06	9	Bishopstown
2	Mark Quinn	Dohenys	1-06	9	Ilen Rovers
2	Brian Hurley	Castlehaven	1-06	9	Carbery Rangers
2	Donal Óg Hodnett	O'Donovan Rossa	0-09	9	Avondhu

=== Miscellaneous ===
- [[Castlehaven GAA|Castlehaven]] win the title for the first time since 2003.
- Duhallow qualify for the final for the first time since 1998.
- St. Finbarr's recorded their first championship defeat of Nemo Rangers since 1989.
