= Brian Looney (Gaelic footballer) =

Gaelic football player

Personal information
- Born: 1987 (age 38–39) Killarney, County Kerry

Sport
- Sport: Gaelic Football
- Position: Right Half Forward
Club
- Years: Club
- Dr Crokes
Club titles
- Kerry titles: 9
- Munster titles: 7
- All-Ireland Titles: 1
Inter-county
- Years: County
- Kerry

Brian Looney is a Gaelic footballer from Killarney, County Kerry. He has played with Kerry at every level and currently plays with the Dr Crokes club

== Career ==
He first played with the Kerry GAA minor team in 2004. He played no part in the Munster championship but came on as a sub in the All Ireland semi final win over Laois and final loss to Tyrone. He was underage again in 2005 but had little success. He then moved on to the Under 21 team in 2008 winning Munster and All Ireland medals. He has had much success at club level with the Dr. Crokes club, winning 3 county championships in a row, 2010–2012. He has also won 3 Munster club titles: one in 2006, one in 2011 and one in 2012. He played in the 2007 All Ireland final winning Man of the Match. In the drawn final, Crokes lost the replays. Looney has also won a number of County league Div 1, County club championship and East Kerry championship titles.
