= Donal Óg Hodnett =

Irish Gaelic footballer

Personal information
- Native name: Donal Óg Mac Searraigh (Irish)
- Born: 1991 (age 34–35) Skibbereen, County Cork, Ireland
- Occupation: Implementation manager

Sport
- Sport: Gaelic football
- Position: Left corner-forward
Club
- Years: Club
- O'Donovan Rossa
Club titles
- Cork titles: 0
College
- Years: College
- 2010-2015: Cork Institute of Technology
College titles
- Sigerson titles: 0
Inter-county*
Years	County	Apps (scores)
2014-2017	Cork	3 (0-01)
Inter-county titles
- Munster titles: 0
- All-Irelands: 0
- NFL: 0
- All Stars: 0
- *Inter County team apps and scores correct as of 22:04, 25 April 2020.

Donal Óg Hodnett (born 1991) is an Irish Gaelic footballer who plays for club side O'Donovan Rossa. He is a former member of the Cork senior football team. Hodnett usually lines out in the forwards. Donal lines out for his local club in the forwards, but can’t swim.

== Honours ==
Cork

- Munster Under-21 Football Championship: 2011, 2012 (c)
