= Munster Senior Club Football Championship =

Gaelic Athletic Association club competition

- Current season or competition: 2026 Munster Senior Club Football Championship
- Irish: Craobh Peile Shinsear Mumhain na gClub
- Code: Gaelic football
- Founded: 1964; 62 years ago
- Region: Munster (GAA)
- Trophy: O'Connor Cup
- No. of teams: 6
- Title holders: Dingle (1st title)
- Most titles: Nemo Rangers (17 titles)
- Sponsors: Allied Irish Banks
- TV partner: TG4
- Motto: The toughest.
- Official website: Munster GAA

The Munster Senior Club Football Championship (known for sponsorship reasons as the AIB Munster GAA Football Senior Club Championship, and shortened to Munster Club SFC) is an annual Gaelic football competition for the champion clubs of each county. It has been organised by the Munster Council of the Gaelic Athletic Association since 1964.

The series of games are played during the autumn and winter months with the final usually being played in late November. The prize for the winning team is the O'Connor Cup, named for Michael O'Connor (1932–1991), a longtime administrator with Dr Crokes and the Munster Council. The championship has always been played on a straight knockout basis whereby once a team loses they are eliminated from the championship.

The Munster Championship is an integral part of the wider All-Ireland Senior Club Football Championship. The winners of the Munster final join the champions of Connacht, Leinster and Ulster in the semi-finals of the All-Ireland Senior Club Championship.

Six clubs currently participate in the Munster Championship. The title has been won at least once by 16 different teams. The all-time record-holders are Nemo Rangers who have won 17 championship titles.

The current holders are Dingle.

== History ==
=== Overview ===
The Munster Championship is a single elimination tournament – a team is eliminated after their first defeat. The fixtures are determined by a random draw and there is no seeding.

Each match is played as a single leg. If a match is drawn, two ten-minute periods of extra time are played. If the match is still level after extra time a replay takes place and so on until the game is won.

== Format ==
=== Championship format ===
Quarter-finals: Four teams contest this round. The two winning teams advance directly to the semi-finals. The two losing teams are eliminated from the championship.

Semi-finals: Four teams contest this round. The two winning teams advance directly to the final. The two losing teams are eliminated from the championship.

Final: The final is contested by the two semi-final winners.

== Teams ==
=== Qualification ===
County	Championship
Clare	Clare Senior Football Championship
Cork	Cork Premier Senior Football Championship
Kerry	Kerry Senior Football Championship
Limerick	Limerick Senior Football Championship
Tipperary	Tipperary Senior Football Championship
Waterford	Waterford Senior Football Championship

== Wins listed by club ==
	Team	County	Wins	Runners Up	Years won	Years runners up
1	Nemo Rangers	Cork	17	2	1972, 1974, 1975, 1978, 1981, 1983, 1987, 1988, 1993, 2000, 2001, 2002, 2005, 2007, 2010, 2017, 2019	1977, 2015
2	Dr Crokes	Kerry	9	2	1990, 1991, 2006, 2011, 2012, 2013, 2016, 2018, 2024	2010, 2017
3	St Finbarr's	Cork	5	4	1979, 1980, 1982, 1986, 2021	1976, 1984, 1985, 2025
4	Castlehaven	Cork	4	1	1989, 1994, 1997, 2023	2012
5	East Kerry	Kerry	3	0	1965, 1968, 1970	-
5	University College Cork	Cork	3	1	1971, 1973, 1999	2011
7	Austin Stacks	Kerry	2	3	1976, 2014	1974, 1975, 2021
7	Castleisland Desmonds	Kerry	2	1	1984, 1985	1982
7	Laune Rangers	Kerry	2	0	1995, 1996	-
7	Kilmurry-Ibrickane	Clare	2	2	2004, 2009	1993, 2008
11	Clonmel Commercials	Tipperary	1	5	2015	1966, 1971, 1990, 1994, 2019
11	Doonbeg	Clare	1	4	1998	1972, 1983, 1991, 1999
11	Dingle	Kerry	1	1	2025	2023
11	Kerins O'Rahilly's	Kerry	1	1	2022	2009
11	Shannon Rangers	Kerry	1	0	1964	-
11	St Nicholas'	Cork	1	0	1966	-
11	Beara	Cork	1	0	1967	-
11	Thomond College	Limerick	1	0	1977	-
11	O'Donovan Rossa	Cork	1	0	1992	
11	An Ghaeltacht	Kerry	1	0	2003	-
11	Dromcollogher-Broadford	Limerick	1	0	2008	
20	St. Senan's, Kilkee	Clare	0	4	-	1989, 1992, 2003, 2005
20	Kilrush Shamrocks	Clare	0	3	-	1978, 1979, 1981
20	The Nire	Waterford	0	3	-	2006, 2014, 2016
20	Stradbally	Waterford	0	2	-	1980, 2004
20	Kilrossanty	Waterford	0	2	-	1986, 1988
20	Moyle Rovers	Tipperary	0	2	-	1995, 1998
20	Fethard	Tipperary	0	2	-	1997, 2001
20	Newcastle West	Limerick	0	2	-	1987, 2022
20	Loughmore-Castleiney	Tipperary	0	2	-	1973, 2024
20	Cooraclare	Clare	0	1	-	1965
20	John Mitchels	Kerry	0	1	-	1967
20	Mid Kerry	Kerry	0	1	-	1968
20	Carbery	Cork	0	1	-	1969
20	Muskerry	Cork	0	1	-	1970
20	Clonakilty	Cork	0	1	-	1996
20	Glenflesk	Kerry	0	1	-	2000
20	Monaleen	Limerick	0	1	-	2002
20	Ballinacourty	Waterford	0	1	-	2007
20	Cratloe	Clare	0	1	-	2013
20	St Joseph's, Miltown Malbay	Clare	0	1	-	2018

== Wins listed by county ==
=== Summary ===
County	Titles	Runners-up	Total
Cork	31	10	41
Kerry	22	11	33
Clare	3	16	19
Limerick	2	3	5
Tipperary	1	11	12
Waterford	0	8	8

=== Winning clubs by county ===
#	County	Winners	Runners-Up	Winning Clubs	Runner-Up Clubs
1	Cork	31	10	Nemo Rangers (16), St Finbarr's (5), Castlehaven (4), University College Cork (3), St Nicholas, Beara, O'Donovan Rossa	St Finbarr's (4), Nemo Rangers (2), University College Cork, Castlehaven, Carbery, Muskerry, Clonakilty
2	Kerry	22	11	Dr Crokes (9), East Kerry (3), Austin Stacks (3), Castleisland Desmonds (2), Laune Rangers (2), Shannon Rangers, An Ghaeltacht, Kerin's O'Rahilly's, Dingle	Dr Crokes (2), Austin Stacks (2), Castleisland Desmonds, John Mitchels, Mid Kerry, Glenflesk, Kerin's O'Rahilly's, Dingle
3	Clare	3	16	Kilmurry-Ibrickane (2), Doonbeg	Doonbeg (4), St. Senan's, Kilkee (4), Kilrush Shamrocks (3), Kilmurry-Ibrickane (2), Cooraclare, Cratloe, St. Joseph's, Miltown Malbay
4	Limerick	2	3	Thomond College, Dromcollogher-Broadford	Newcastle West (2), Monaleen
5	Tipperary	1	10	Clonmel Commercials	Clonmel Commercials (5), Moyle Rovers (2), Fethard (2), Loughmore-Castleiney
6	Waterford	0	8	None	The Nire (3), Stradbally (2), Kilrossanty (2), Ballinacourty

== List of finals ==
Year	Winners			Runners-up		
Year	County	Club	Score	County	Club	Score
2025	Kerry	Dingle	1-18	Cork	St Finbarr's	0-20
2024	Kerry	Dr Crokes	0-15	Tipperary	Loughmore–Castleiney	1-06
2023	Cork	Castlehaven	0-13 (4 pen)	Kerry	Dingle	0-13 (3 pen)
2022	Kerry	Kerins O'Rahilly's	2-06	Limerick	Newcastle West	1-08
2021	Cork	St Finbarr's	2-09	Kerry	Austin Stacks	1-10
2020	Cancelled due to the impact of the COVID-19 pandemic on Gaelic games					
2019	Cork	Nemo Rangers	0-15	Tipperary	Clonmel Commercials	0-06
2018	Kerry	Dr Crokes	1-21	Clare	St Joseph's, Miltown Malbay	2-09
2017	Cork	Nemo Rangers	0-16	Kerry	Dr Crokes	0-11
2016	Kerry	Dr Crokes	3-15	Waterford	The Nire	0-06
2015	Tipperary	Clonmel Commercials	1-07	Cork	Nemo Rangers	0-09
2014	Kerry	Austin Stacks	3-05	Waterford	The Nire	2-04
2013	Kerry	Dr Crokes	0-13	Clare	Cratloe	0-12
2012	Kerry	Dr Crokes	0-19	Cork	Castlehaven	0-12
2011	Kerry	Dr Crokes	3-14	Cork	UCC	2-10
2010	Cork	Nemo Rangers	1-15	Kerry	Dr Crokes	1-13
2009	Clare	Kilmurry-Ibrickane	0-07	Kerry	Kerins O'Rahillys	0-06
2008	Limerick	Dromcollogher-Broadford	0-06	Clare	Kilmurry-Ibrickane	0-05
2007	Cork	Nemo Rangers	1-10	Waterford	Ballinacourty	1-07
2006	Kerry	Dr Crokes	2-05	Waterford	The Nire	0-08
2005	Cork	Nemo Rangers	2-12	Clare	St. Senan's, Kilkee	1-06
2004	Clare	Kilmurry-Ibrickane	0-09 0-09 (R)	Waterford	Stradbally	0-09 0-08 (R)
2003	Kerry	An Ghaeltacht	1-08	Clare	St. Senan's, Kilkee	1-06
2002	Cork	Nemo Rangers	4-15	Limerick	Monaleen	0-06
2001	Cork	Nemo Rangers	1-11	Tipperary	Fethard	0-10
2000	Cork	Nemo Rangers	0-11	Kerry	Glenflesk	0-07
1999	Cork	UCC	1-17	Clare	Doonbeg	0-07
1998	Clare	Doonbeg	0-07	Tipperary	Moyle Rovers	0-04
1997	Cork	Castlehaven	1-14	Tipperary	Fethard	1-08
1996	Kerry	Laune Rangers	0-13	Cork	Clonakilty	0-10
1995	Kerry	Laune Rangers	3-19	Tipperary	Moyle Rovers	2-04
1994	Cork	Castlehaven	2-14	Tipperary	Clonmel Commercials	1-04
1993	Cork	Nemo Rangers	1-17	Clare	Kilmurry-Ibrickane	0-04
1992	Cork	O'Donovan Rossa	2-13	Clare	St. Senan's, Kilkee	0-12
1991	Kerry	Dr Crokes	2-10	Clare	Doonbeg	0-08
1990	Kerry	Dr Crokes	0-15	Tipperary	Clonmel Commercials	0-10
1989	Cork	Castlehaven	0-13	Clare	St. Senan's, Kilkee	1-08
1988	Cork	Nemo Rangers	1-06	Waterford	Kilrossanty	1-02
1987	Cork	Nemo Rangers	5-15	Limerick	Newcastle West	2-03
1986	Cork	St Finbarr's	2-15	Waterford	Kilrossanty	1-05
1985	Kerry	Castleisland Desmonds	1-11	Cork	St Finbarr's	0-05
1984	Kerry	Castleisland Desmonds	2-06	Cork	St Finbarr's	0-09
1983	Cork	Nemo Rangers	2-10	Clare	Doonbeg	0-03
1982	Cork	St Finbarr's	2-06	Kerry	Castleisland Desmonds	0-06
1981	Cork	Nemo Rangers	3-09	Clare	Kilrush Shamrocks	1-06
1980	Cork	St Finbarr's	3-12	Waterford	Stradbally	1-08
1979	Cork	St Finbarr's	0-10	Clare	Kilrush Shamrocks	0-04
1978	Cork	Nemo Rangers	0-08	Clare	Kilrush Shamrocks	0-06
1977	Limerick	Thomond College	0-12	Cork	Nemo Rangers	1-03
1976	Kerry	Austin Stacks	1-07	Cork	St Finbarr's	0-08
1975	Cork	Nemo Rangers	1-09	Kerry	Austin Stacks	0-10
1974	Cork	Nemo Rangers	2-06	Kerry	Austin Stacks	1-07
1973	Cork	UCC	2-08	Tipperary	Loughmore-Castleiney	1-05
1972	Cork	Nemo Rangers	3-09	Clare	Doonbeg	0-05
1971	Cork	UCC	2-09	Tipperary	Clonmel Commercials	1-08
1970	Kerry	East Kerry	0-07	Cork	Muskerry	0-06
1969	Championship not completed					
1968	Kerry	East Kerry	2-10	Cork	Carbery	1-10
1967	Cork	Beara	1-11	Kerry	Mid Kerry	2-07
1966	Cork	St Nicholas	2-04	Kerry	John Mitchels	1-06
1965	Kerry	East Kerry	3-07	Tipperary	Clonmel Commercials	0-07
1964	Kerry	Shannon Rangers	2-07	Clare	Cooraclare	0-04

- St Finbarr's won the Munster Senior Club Football and Hurling championships in 1980 and are currently the only Munster club team to achieve this double.

== Records and statistics ==
=== Final ===
==== Team ====
- Most wins: 17:
  - Nemo Rangers (1972, 1974, 1975, 1978, 1981, 1983, 1987, 1988, 1993, 2000, 2001, 2002, 2005, 2007, 2010, 2017, 2019)
- Most consecutive wins: 3:
  - Nemo Rangers (2000, 2001, 2002)
  - Dr Crokes (2011, 2012, 2013)
- Most appearances in a final: 19:
  - Nemo Rangers (1972, 1974, 1975, 1977, 1978, 1981, 1983, 1987, 1988, 1993, 2000, 2001, 2002, 2005, 2007, 2010, 2015, 2017, 2019)
- Most appearances in a final without losing (streak): 12
  - Nemo Rangers (1978, 1981, 1983, 1987, 1988, 1993, 2000, 2001, 2002, 2005, 2007, 2010)
- Most defeats: 5
  - Clonmel Commercials (1965, 1971, 1990, 1994, 2019)

=== Teams ===
==== By decade ====
The most successful team of each decade, judged by number of Munster Championship titles, is as follows:

- 1960s: 2 for East Kerry (1965–68)
- 1970s: 4 for Nemo Rangers (1972-74-75-78)
- 1980s: 4 for Nemo Rangers (1981-83-87-88)
- 1990s: 2 each for Dr Crokes (1990–91), Castlehaven (1994-97) and Laune Rangers (1995–96)
- 2000s: 5 for Nemo Rangers (2000-01-02-05-07)
- 2010s: 4 for Dr Crokes (2011-12-13-16)

==== Gaps ====
Top three longest gaps between successive championship titles:

- 38 years: Austin Stacks (1976–2014)
- 27 years: Castlehaven (1997–2023)
- 26 years: University College Cork (1973–1999)
- 15 years: Dr Crokes (1991–2006)

=== Top scorers ===
==== All time ====
As of match played 1 December 2019.

Rank	Name	Team	Goals	Points	Total
1	Mikey Sheehy	Austin Stacks	17	91	142
2	Colm Cooper	Dr. Crokes	10	67	97
3	Paul Kerrigan	Nemo Rangers	5	55	70
4	James Masters	Nemo Rangers	5	54	69
5	Daithí Casey	Dr. Crokes	7	45	66
6	Dinny Allen	Nemo Rangers	8	51	65
7	Kieran O'Leary	Dr. Crokes	6	36	54
8	Colin Corkery	Nemo Rangers	3	42	51
9	Niall Curran	Stradbally	1	46	49
9	Brian Looney	Dr. Crokes	3	40	49
10	Franny Kelly	Clonmel Commercials	3	37	46

==== Overall ====
Year	Top scorer	Team	Score	Total
1980	Eoin O'Brien	Stradbally	2-11	17
1981	Charlie Murphy	Nemo Rangers	3-06	15
1982				
1983	Ephie Fitzgerald	Nemo Rangers	2-11	17
1984				
1985	Dave Barry	St. Finbarr's	0-12	12
1986	Dave Barry	St. Finbarr's	0-15	15
1987	Seán Gleeson	Newcastle West	2-05	11
1987	Tony Nation	Nemo Rangers	1-08	11
1988	Ephie Fitzgerald	Nemo Rangers	2-04	10
1989	John Murray	St. Senan's, Kilkee	2-11	17
1990	Franny Kelly	Clonmel Commercials	0-13	13
1991	Gerry Killeen	Doonbeg	0-19	19
1992	Mick McCarthy	O'Donovan Rossa	1-13	16
1993	Colin Corkery	Nemo Rangers	1-16	19
1994	Franny Kelly	Clonmel Commercials	2-12	18
1995	Gerard Murphy	Laune Rangers	3-10	19
1996	Terry Dillon	Clonakilty	2-08	14
1997	John Cleary	Castlehaven	3-07	16
1998	Declan Browne	Moyle Rovers	1-11	14
1999	Paul Hehir	Doonbeg	1-09	12
1999	Martin Power	Rathgormack	0-12	12
2000	Johnny Crowley	Glenflesk	1-05	8
2001	Michael Reidy	Dromcollogher/Broadford	1-12	15
2002	Colin Corkery	Nemo Rangers	2-12	18
2003	Michael O'Shea	St. Senan's, Kilkee	1-04	7
2003	Michael Keane	St. Senan's, Kilkee	0-07	7
2004	Niall Curran	Stradbally	0-19	19
2005	James Masters	Nemo Rangers	1-12	15
2006	Colm Cooper	Dr. Crokes	3-05	14
2006	Barry Grogan	Aherlow	1-11	14
2007	James Masters	Nemo Rangers	0-15	15
2008	Paul Kerrigan	Nemo Rangers	2-07	13
2009	Declan Quill	Kerins O'Rahilly's	1-09	12
2010	Colm Cooper	Dr. Crokes	2-08	14
2011	Paul Geaney	UCC	3-14	23
2012	Colm Cooper	Dr. Crokes	1-12	15
2013	Brian Looney	Dr. Crokes	1-12	15
2014	Conor Gleeson	The Nire	2-08	14
2015	Michael Quinlivan	Clonmel Commercials	2-08	14
2016	Daithí Casey	Dr. Crokes	4-05	17
2017	Luke Connolly	Nemo Rangers	1-13	16
2018	Tony Brosnan	Dr. Crokes	0-19	19
2019	Luke Connolly	Nemo Rangers	0-13	13
2021	Steven Sherlock	St. Finbarr's	0-13	13
2022	Gavin Cooney	Éire Óg, Ennis	2-09	15
2023	Brian Hurley	Castlehaven	1-20	23

==== Single game ====
Year	Top scorer	Team	Score	Total
2000	Colin Corkery	Nemo Rangers	0-06	6
2001	Michael Reidy	Dromcollogher/Broadford	1-05	8
2002	Colin Corkery	Nemo Rangers	2-03	9
2003	Colin Crowley	Castlehaven	0-06	6
2004	Johnny Daly	Kilmurry-Ibrickane	0-06	6
2004	Niall Curran	Stradbally	0-06	6
2005	Niall Curran	Stradbally	0-09	9
2006	Barry Grogan	Aherlow	1-05	8
2007	Kieran O'Callaghan	Ballylanders	1-05	8
2007	James Masters	Nemo Rangers	0-08	8
2008	Paul Kerrigan	Nemo Rangers	2-05	11
2009	Barry John Walsh	Kerins O'Rahilly's	1-03	6
2010	Colm Cooper	Dr. Crokes	2-05	11
2011	Paul Geaney	UCC	2-05	11
2012	Colm Cooper	Dr. Crokes	0-08	8
2013	Brian Looney	Dr. Crokes	1-06	9
2014	Cathal McInerney	Cratloe	1-06	9
2015	James Masters	Nemo Rangers	1-05	8
2016	Daithí Casey	Dr. Crokes	3-01	10
2017	Luke Connolly	St Finbarr's	0-10	10
2018	Kieran O'Leary	Dr. Crokes	2-02	8
2018	Tony Brosnan	Dr. Crokes	0-08	8
2021	Steven Sherlock	St Finbarr's	0-09	9
2022	Gavin Cooney	Éire Óg, Ennis	2-04	10
2023	Brian Hurley	Castlehaven	1-06	9

==== In finals ====
Year	Top scorer	Team	Score	Total
2000	Colin Corkery	Nemo Rangers	0-06	6
2001	Colin Corkery	Nemo Rangers	0-06	6
2002	Colin Corkery	Nemo Rangers	2-03	9
2003	Conall Ó Cruadhlaoich	An Ghaeltacht	1-01	4
2003	Denis Russell	St. Senan's, Kilkee	0-04	4
2004	Johnny Daly	Kilmurry-Ibrickane	0-05	5
2005	James Masters	Nemo Rangers	1-05	8
2006	Colm Cooper	Dr. Crokes	2-01	7
2007	James Masters	Nemo Rangers	0-05	5
2008	Multiple players	Multiple clubs	0-02	2
2009	Ian McInerney	Kilmurry-Ibrickane	0-03	3
2009	Declan Quill	Kerins O'Rahilly's	0-03	3
2010	Kieran O'Leary	Dr. Crokes	1-04	7
2011	Daithí Casey	Dr. Crokes	2-03	9
2012	Brian Looney	Dr. Crokes	0-07	7
2013	Cathal McInerney	Cratloe	0-05	5
2014	David Mannix	Austin Stacks	1-02	5
2015	Michael Quinlivan	Clonmel Commercials	1-03	6
2016	Daithí Casey	Dr. Crokes	3-01	10
2017	Luke Connolly	Nemo Rangers	0-10	10
2018	Tony Brosnan	Dr. Crokes	0-08	8
2019	Luke Connolly	Nemo Rangers	0-07	7
2021	Sean Quilter	Austin Stacks	1-04	7
2022	Eoin Hurley	Newcastle West	0-05	5
2023	Brian Hurley	Castlehaven	0-07	7

== See also ==
- Munster Intermediate Club Football Championship (Tier 2)
- Munster Junior Club Football Championship (Tier 3)
