= 2013 All-Ireland Under-21 Football Championship =

Championship details
- Teams: 32

All-Ireland Champions
- Winning team: Galway (5th win)
- Captain: Fiontán Ó Curraoin
- Manager: Alan Flynn

All-Ireland Finalists
- Losing team: Cork
- Captain: Damien Cahalane
- Manager: John Cleary

Provincial Champions
- Munster: Cork
- Leinster: Kildare
- Ulster: Cavan
- Connacht: Galway

Championship statistics

The 2013 All-Ireland Under-21 Football Championship was the 50th staging of the All-Ireland Under-21 Football Championship since its establishment by the Gaelic Athletic Association in 1964.

Dublin entered the championship as the defending champions, however, they were beaten by Longford in the Leinster quarter-finals.

The All-Ireland final was played on 4 May 2013 at the Gaelic Grounds in Limerick, between Galway and Cork, in what was their third meeting in the final overall and a first meeting in 24 years. Galway won the match by 1–14 to 1–11 to claim their fifth championship title overall and a first tile in two years.

== Munster Under-21 Football Championship ==
=== Munster quarter-finals ===
13 March 2013 Quarter-final	Cork	0-14 - 2-07	Kerry	Páirc Uí Rinn

13 March 2013 Quarter-final	Tipperary	1-17 - 0-09	Waterford	Semple Stadium

=== Munster semi-finals ===
27 March 2013 Semi-final	Limerick	0-11 - 2-14	Cork	Gaelic Grounds

27 March 2013 Semi-final	Tipperary	1-12 - 0-07	Clare	Semple Stadium

=== Munster final ===
10 April 2013 Final	Tipperary	0-09 - 1-17	Cork	Semple Stadium
	L McGrath 0-5 (frees); S Leahy 0-2; J Lonergan, S O’Brien 0-1 each.	Report	M Sugrue 1-1; A Cadogan, B Hurley (2f), L Connolly, D Mc Eoin (1f) 0-3 each; T Clancy, J Wall, K Hallissey, T Hegarty 0-1 each.

== All-Ireland Under-21 Football Championship ==
=== All-Ireland semi-finals ===
20 April 2013 Semi-final	Cork	0-15 - 1-11	Cavan	Bord Na Móna O'Connor Park
	D Mac Eoin 0-4 (0-4f), M Sugrue 0-3, B O'Driscoll, B Hurley, L Connolly 0-2 each, D Cahalane (0-1 '45'), A Cadogan 0-1 each	Report	C Conroy 1-0, E Reilly 0-3, J Brady (0-1f), P O'Connor 0-2 each, T Mooney, D McVitty, C Madden, C Moynagh 0-1 each

20 April 2013 Semi-final	Galway	2-10 - 2-05	Kildare	Bord Na Móna O'Connor Park
	S Walsh 0-6 (3fs), S Moran 1-1, T Flynn 1-0, I Burke 0-1, D Comer 0-1, C Mulryan (0-1).	Report	D Flynn 1-1, S Hurley 1-0, N Kelly 0-1, P Cribbin 0-1, F Dowling 0-1, P Fogarty 0-1.

=== All-Ireland final ===
4 May 2013 Final	Galway	1-14 - 1-11	Cork	Gaelic Grounds
	I Burke, S Walsh (0-4f) 0-4 each, C Mulryan 0-3, D Comer 1-0, D Cunnane, P Varley, A Varley 0-1 each.	Report	B Hurley 1-4 (0-1f), D Mac Eoin 0-4 (0-1f), D Cahalane (0-1 ’45), A Cadogan, C Vaughan 0-1 each.
