= 2010 All-Ireland Minor Football Championship =

Gaelic football competition

All-Ireland Minor Football Championship 2010
Championship details
- Dates: 14 April – 19 September 2010
- Teams: 33.5

All-Ireland Champions
- Winning team: Tyrone (4th win)
- Captain: S. McGarrity
- Manager: Raymond Munroe

All-Ireland Finalists
- Losing team: Cork
- Captain: A. Cronin
- Manager: Brian Cuthbert

Provincial Champions
- Munster: Cork
- Leinster: Longford
- Ulster: Tyrone
- Connacht: Mayo

Championship statistics
- No. matches played: 47
- Goals total: 116 (2.46 per game)
- Points total: 951 (20.23 per game)

The 2010 All-Ireland Minor Football Championship (known for sponsorship reasons as the ESB Minor Football Championship) is the premier "knockout" competition for under-18 competitors of the game of Gaelic football played in Ireland. The series of games are organised by the Gaelic Athletic Association and are played during the summer months with the All-Ireland Minor Football Final being played on the third Sunday in September 2010 in Croke Park, Dublin.

== Leinster Minor Football Championship ==
=== First round ===
17 April 2010	Wicklow	2-13 - 1-09	Wexford	Aughrim Park, Aughrim
3:00 PM IST		LMC Report

17 April 2010	Carlow	0-06 - 1-12	Westmeath	Dr. Cullen Park, Carlow
5:30 PM IST		Westmeath GAA Results

17 April 2010	Louth	0-14 - 5-09	Laois	Drogheda Park, Drogheda
3:00 PM IST		Laois Nationalist

17 April 2010	Kildare	2-10 - 1-09	Dublin	St. Conleth's Park, Newbridge
3:00 PM IST	K. Feely 1-3 (goal from pen); F. Dowling 1-0; P. Cocoman, S. Hurley (frees) 0-2 each; P. Cribbin, C. Murphy, P. Fogarty 0-1 each.	NewsFinch Clane	C. Kilkenny 1-7 (0-5 from frees); F. Duffy, A. Caffrey 0-1 each.

17 April 2010	Offaly	2-19 - 0-03	Longford	O'Connor Park, Tullamore
3:00 PM IST

17 April 2010	Meath	6-26 - 0-00	Kilkenny	Páirc Tailteann, Navan
3:00 PM IST	S. Barry 2-02 (2 from frees); D. Landy 1-04; F. Toolan 1-02; P. Fox 0-04 (1 from free); J. Conlon, C. Devereux 0-03 each; F. McManus, L. Tolan 1-00 each; D. S. Mattimoe, B. McMahon 0-02 (1 from free), C. O'Brien, Queeney (1 from free, 1 from 45') 0-02 each	HoganStand.com		Referee: J. Murray (Dublin)

=== Second Round - Losers Section ===
24 April 2010	Longford	2-12 - 1-07	Wexford	Pearse Park, Longford
3:00 PM IST

24 April 2010	Dublin	4-11 - 0-05	Louth	Parnell Park, Dublin
3:00 PM IST

=== Third round ===
8 May 2010	Longford	1-13 - 1-04	Carlow	Pearse Park, Longford
3:00 PM IST		Carlow Nationalist

8 May 2010	Dublin	v	Kilkenny
3:00 PM IST		Cancelled*

- Dublin advanced directly to the quarter-finals

=== Quarter-finals ===
22 May 2010	Offaly	1-09 - 1-08	Meath	Páirc Tailteann, Navan
3:00 PM IST

22 May 2010	Longford	1-06 - 0-06	Westmeath	Cusack Park, Mullingar
3:00 PM IST

22 May 2010	Kildare	0-16 - 1-13; AET	Dublin	St. Conleth's Park, Newbridge
3:00 PM IST	P. Fogarty 0-4; L. McGovern (3 from frees), F. Dowling 0-3 each; P. Cocoman, P. Cribbin, F. Conway, S. Hurley, T. Moolick, N. Kelly 0-1 each	Leinster Leader	H. Dawson 1-7; F. Duffy 0-3 (1 from free); A. Caffrey 0-2 (1 from free); P. Ryan 0-1	Referee: J. Curley (Meath)

22 May 2010	Laois	0-17 - 1-13	Wicklow	O'Moore Park, Portlaoise
5:15 PM IST		Wicklow GAA

29 May 2010	Dublin	1-13 - 2-10; AET	Kildare	Parnell Park, Dublin
3:00 PM IST	P. Ryan 1-04 (0-01 from free); C. Diamond 0-03 (2 from free); S. Stewart, P. Duffy (1 from free) 0-02 each; A. Caffrey, J. McCaffrey 0-01 each	HoganStand.com	P. Fogarty 1-02; K. Feely 1-01 (1-0 from pen); L. McGovern 0-03 (1 from free); F. Dowling, P. Cribbin, K. Hurley, P. Cocoman 0-01 each

29 June 2010	Kildare	1-13 - 0-13	Dublin	Páirc Tailteann, Navan
	P. Cribben 0-05; P. Fogarty 1-01; L. McGovern 0-03 (2 from frees); S. Hurley 0-02 (1 from free); M. Duke, F. Dowling 0-01 each	HoganStand.com	C. Kilkenny 0-08 (6 from frees); C. Woods 0-02; A. Caffrey, H. Dawson, S. Stewart, 0-01 each	Referee: D. Brazil (Offaly)

=== Semi-finals ===
30 June 2010	Offaly	0-10 - 0-09	Laois	O'Connor Park, Tullamore
7:15 PM IST		Laois Nationalist

4 July 2010	Longford	3-05 - 0-13	Kildare	Pearse Park, Longford
7:00 PM IST		Kildare Nationalist

=== Final ===
11 July 2010	Longford	0-14 - 0-08	Offaly	Croke Park, Dublin
	R. Smith 0-07; B. McKeon, D. Farrelly 0-02 each; D. Cooney, P. McCormack, D. Mimnagh 0-01 each	Longford GAA	N.A. Graham 0-04 (3 from frees, 1 from 45'); P. Cunningham, D. Kelly, S. Cullen, B. Cushen 0-01 each	Referee: J. Curley (Meath)

- All Leinster Championship results taken from Leinster GAA and Cork GAA archived pages.

== Connacht Minor Football Championship ==
=== Quarter-finals ===
9 May 2010	Galway	5-18 - 1-03	New York	Pearse Stadium, Galway

26 June 2010	Mayo	1-11 - 0-11	Roscommon	McHale Park, Castlebar

=== Semi-finals ===
27 June 2010	Galway	0-13 - 0-09	Sligo	Pearse Stadium, Galway
		Connacht GAA		Referee: V. Neary

3 July 2010	Mayo	2-12 - 1-07	Leitrim	Páirc Seán Mac Diarmada, Carrick-on-Shannon

=== Final ===
18 July 2010	Mayo	3-09 - 1-10	Galway	McHale Park, Castlebar
		Connacht GAA		Referee: D. Hunt

== Munster Minor Football Championship ==
=== Quarter-finals ===
14 April 2010	Kerry	1-12 - 2-07	Tipperary	Austin Stack Park, Tralee
		Connacht GAA

14 April 2010	Limerick	3-10 - 2-04	Waterford	Kilmallock

14 April 2010	Clare	0-09 - 1-09	Cork	Cusack Park, Ennis

=== Play-offs ===
19 April 2010	Clare	4-10 - 1-06	Waterford	Cusack Park, Ennis

24 April 2010	Tipperary	1-08 - 1-03	Clare	Semple Stadium, Thurles

=== Semi-finals ===
12 May 2010	Kerry	2-15 - 0-07	Limerick	Newcastlewest

12 May 2010	Cork	2-12 - 2-09	Tipperary	Semple Stadium, Ennis

=== Final ===
4 July 2010	Cork	1-08 - 1-07	Kerry	Fitzgerald Stadium, Killarney

- All Munster Championship results taken from

== Ulster Minor Football Championship ==
=== First round ===
16 May 2010	Derry	2-08 - 2-09	Armagh	Celtic Park, Derry
12:00 PM

=== Quarter-finals ===
23 May 2010	Antrim	1-08 - 1-13	Tyrone	Casement Park, Belfast
2:00 PM

29 May 2010	Monaghan	1-08 - 1-13	Armagh	Páirc Esler, Newry
7:00 PM

30 May 2010	Donegal	0-12 - 2-10	Down	MacCumhaill Park, Ballybofey
12:00 PM

30 May 2010	Cavan	2-16 - 1-10	Fermanagh	St. Tiernach's Park, Clones
7:00 PM

=== Semi-finals ===
19 June 2010	Tyrone	1-10 - 0-10	Down	Casement Park, Belfast
3:30 PM

4 July 2010	Cavan	0-11 - 1-10	Armagh	St. Tiernach's Park, Clones
7:00 PM

=== Final ===
18 July 2010	Armagh	0-05 - 1-14	Tyrone	St. Tiernach's Park, Clones
12:00 PM

== All-Ireland Series ==
=== Quarter-finals ===
31 July 2010	Mayo	1-14 - 1-12	Offaly

31 July 2010	Galway	0-10 - 1-06	Longford

31 July 2010	Tyrone	2-12 - 0-09	Kerry

1 August 2010	Cork	3-11 - 0-19	Armagh

=== Semi-finals ===
28 August 2010	Tyrone	3-10 - 0-16	Mayo

29 August 2010	Cork	3-15 - 5-08	Galway

=== Final ===
19 September 2010	Tyrone	1-13 - 1-12	Cork	Croke Park, Dublin
1:15 PM	J McCullagh 0-04; H. Óg Conlon 1-00; C. Grugan, R. O'Neill (0-01 from free) 0-02 each; T. Canavan (0-01 from free), E. Deeney, R. Devlin, M. Donaghy, N. Sludden, 0-01 each	The Irish Times	D. McEoin 0-05; K. Hallissey 1-01; J. O'Rourke, B. Hurley (0-03 from frees) 0-03 each	Attendance: 81,604; Referee: M. Duffy (Sligo)
