= 2011 All-Ireland Under-21 Football Championship =

Gaelic football competition

Championship details
- Dates: 23 February – 1 May 2011
- Teams: 32

All-Ireland Champions
- Winning team: Galway (4th win)
- Captain: Colin Forde
- Manager: Alan Mulholland

All-Ireland Finalists
- Losing team: Cavan
- Captain: Gearóid McKiernan
- Manager: Terry Hyland

Provincial Champions
- Munster: Cork
- Leinster: Wexford
- Ulster: Cavan
- Connacht: Galway

Championship statistics
- Player of the Year: Tom Flynn

The 2011 All-Ireland Under-21 Football Championship was the 48th staging of the All-Ireland Under-21 Championship since its establishment by the Gaelic Athletic Association in 1964.

Dublin were the defending champions, but were beaten by Meath in the Leinster quarter-final.

Galway defeated Cavan by 2–16 to 1–9 in the final at Croke Park, for their fourth title and first since 2005.

Galway midfielder Tom Flynn was named Cadbury Hero of the Future.

== All-Ireland Under-21 Football Championship ==
=== All-Ireland semi-finals ===
16 April 2011 Semi-final	Galway	1–11 – 0–12	Cork	Ennis
	Mark Hehir 0–5 (0–3f), Michael Boyle 1–1, Eric Monahan 0–2 (0–1f), Patrick Sweeney 0–1, Tom Flynn 0–1, Michael Farragher 0–1	Report	Ciarán Sheehan 0–4, Mark Collins 0–3 (0–1f), Barry O'Driscoll 0–2, Donal Óg Hodnett 0–1, Kevin Hallissey 0–1, Aidan Walsh 0–1	Stadium: Cusack Park; Referee: Joe Curley

16 April 2011 Semi-final	Cavan	1–10 – 0–8	Wexford	Dublin
	Niall McDermott 1–2, Jack Brady 0–3 (0–1f), Barry Reilly 0–2 (0–2f), Michael Brady 0–1, Gearóid McKiernan 0–1, Niall Smith 0–1	Report	Conor Carty 0–5 (0–3f), Michael O'Regan 0–1 (0–1f), Killian Kehoe 0–1, Declan Murphy 0–1	Stadium: Parnell Park; Referee: Padraig O'Sullivan

=== All-Ireland final ===
1 May 2011 Final	Galway	2–16 – 1–9	Cavan	Dublin
14:00	Mark Hehir 0–7 (0–4f), Patrick Sweeney 1–0, Eric Monahan 1–0, Danny Cummins 0–4, Michael Boyle 0–2 (0–2f), Joss Moore 0–2, Conor Doherty 0–1	Report	Conor McClarey 1–0, Barry Reilly 0–2 (0–1f), Niall McDermott 0–2, Jack Brady 0–1 (0–1f), Niall Smith 0–1, Feargal Flanagan 0–1, Niall Murray 0–1, Kevin Tierney 0–1	Stadium: Croke Park; Referee: Eddie Kinsella
