= Glen Rovers–St Finbarr's hurling rivalry =

Hurling team rivalry

Glen Rovers v St Finbarr's
- Location: Cork
- Teams: Glen Rovers; St Finbarr's
- First meeting: 7 October 1934; Glen Rovers 3–2 – 0–6 St Finbarr's
- Latest meeting: 1 August 2020; Glen Rovers 3–20 – 0–15 St Finbarr's; Cork PSHC

Statistics
- Total meetings: 38
- Most wins: Glen Rovers (21)
- Top scorer: Patrick Horgan (3-53)
- All-time series: Glen Rovers: 21; Drawn: 4 St Finbarr's: 13

The Glen Rovers–St Finbarr's rivalry is a hurling rivalry between Cork city club teams Glen Rovers and St Finbarr's. It is considered to be one of the biggest rivalries in Cork hurling.

Glen Rovers and St Finbarr's first played a senior championship match on 7 October 1934; as of August 2020, the two clubs had faced each other 38 times in total. Glen Rovers have won 21 and St Finbarr's have won 13, with four ending in a draw.

Regarded as two of Cork club hurling's "big three", with Blackrock making up the trio, a county final between The Glen and the Barr's is historically regarded as a special occasion.

== History ==
=== Formation to 1934 ===
Just four miles apart and geographically divided by the broad span of the River Lee, the Glen Rovers–St Finbarr's rivalry is essentially a northside-southside one. Formed as St Finbarr's National Hurling & Football Club in Togher in 1876, the club had been active and competitive in the years before the establishment of the Gaelic Athletic Association in 1884. They entered a team in the inaugural Cork County Championship in 1887 and claimed their first title in 1899. St Finbarr's, along with their great rivals from the early years of the championship Blackrock, are the only two teams that have never been relegated or faced regrading from senior level.

Glen Rovers was established in 1916 after five Blackpool-based members of the Brian Dillons club broke away over the failure to present winners' medals to the players after claiming the Cork Minor Championship in 1915. A decade after their formation, Glen Rovers joined the senior ranks after back-to-back promotions from the County Junior Championship in 1924 and the County Intermediate Championship in 1925.

The first recorded meeting of the Glen Rovers and St Finbarr's senior teams was in the Bride Valley Gold Medal Tournament on 20 March 1927. St Finbarr's trailed by four goals to two at half time but came back in the second half to win by 6–2 to 5–1. The Association was in its golden jubilee year when Glen Rovers and St Finbarr's had their first ever senior championship meeting in the 1934 final. At that stage St Finbarr's had won ten championship titles, were in second position on the all-time roll of honour, were the reigning champions and were attempting to claim a third successive title for the first time in over 25 years. On 7 October 1934, 18,516 people officially attended that first meeting; however, such was the interest in the encounter that up to 25,000 spectators may have seen the match after thousands rushed the gate. The game marked a milestone in Cork hurling as the cup went "over the bridge" to the northside of the city for the first time after the Glen's 3–2 to 0–6 victory. It was also the first of a record eight final victories in succession for Glen Rovers, a sequence which included defeats of St Finbarr's at different stages of the championship in 1941 and 1943.

=== 1934–1958 ===
St Finbarr's secured their first championship victory over Glen Rovers in the 1943 semi-final before the two sides clashed for the second time in a final on 22 October 1944. The history of a decade earlier repeated itself as the Barr's entered the match as reigning champions in search of a third successive title, while the rivalry had been amplified as a result of their clashes in the Augustinians Tournaments. 24,520 spectators saw the Glen, a team with nine final debutants, claim the title after a 5–7 to 3–3 victory. Glen Rovers once again asserted their dominance in the 1945 semi-final with a record 10–8 to 2–3 victory.

On 16 November 1946, Glen Rovers and St Finbarr's met in the final for the third time in their history. Very heavy rain in the preceding days had the match in jeopardy; however, it was decided to go ahead as planned, rather than play the match in December with an even heavier sod. For the first time in their history, Glen Rovers failed to score in the first half and for ten minutes of the second half. Meanwhile, the Barr's, who had the advantage of the wind, built up a six-point interval lead. Leading by 2–3 to no score with just over ten minutes remaining, St Finbarr's failed to score again. Their defence held firm, with Seán Condon giving his best ever performance for the club, in their first ever final defeat of the Glen.

After avenging the 1946 defeat in the 1949 semi-final, the Glen faced the Barr's in a fourth final on 17 September 1950. Heavy rain once again impacted on the game, with St Finbarr's taking a narrow 0–4 to 1–0 lead at half-time. A Jack Lynch goal, after a Christy Ring assist, reignited the Glen attack, and the northsiders went on to win the game by 2–8 to 0–5. The game marked the end of the playing careers of Jack Lynch and Paddy O'Donovan.

"Come on outta that. We'll go up to the North Gate Bridge and feed our own swans."

— Punchline of an apocryphal story about two Glen Rovers supporters who get lost after a crushing defeat at the Athletic Grounds. After pausing on the South Gate Bridge, they disconsolately throw the remnants of their sandwiches to the swans before suddenly realising they are in enemy territory.

Glen Rovers recorded their eighth championship win over St Finbarr's in the 1954 first round before both sides clashed in their fifth final on 9 October 1955. The Glen had secured second position on the all-time roll of honour the previous year, leading the Barr's 15–14, and were in search of a third successive title. A drawn game resulted in a then record crowd of 31,019 turning up for the replay the following week. An inspired St Finbarr's scored four goals in a fifteen-minute spell in the first half which saw them secure a 5–4 to 2–2 half-time lead and put the game beyond doubt, with the Cork Examiner stating that "never was a win more justified." The 17-point defeat was a sensational low point for the Glen and elevated the rivalry to a new level.

The 1958 final between the Glen and the Barr's is regarded by many, including the match reporter in the following day's Cork Examiner, as the greatest of all time. For thrills and tension it surpassed any club game that had gone before it and "may never be equalled." Aided by a strong wind, the Glen, minus the services of Christy Ring, built up what appeared to be a commanding 3–5 to 0–2 interval lead. Points were exchanged quickly after the resumption and goals by Tom Maher and Donal Hurley brought St Finbarr's to within four points. Further goals looked inevitable but for the masterful goalkeeping of Seán O'Brien. The last twenty minutes of the game saw both sides launch several onslaughts on the others goal, however, the Glen's defence held firm to secure a 4-06 to 3-05 win and edge them 4-2 ahead on the county final victory front.

=== 1958–1980 ===
Six years elapsed before the next Glen-Barr's meeting on 11 October 1964. In the intervening period, Glen Rovers had added to their championship title count with victories in 1959, 1960 and 1962, while St Finbarr's had failed to land the title. In spite of this, the Barr's were favourites in the 1964 final. The favourites tag looked justified as St Finbarr's dominated the first half, until a Christy Ring goal gave Glen Rovers a 1–4 to 0–6 interval lead. The second period of play ebbed and flowed, with scores by Mick Archer and Mossie Finn of St Finbarr's setting up a cliffhanger finale. The Glen held first to secure their 20th championship title after the 3–12 to 2–7 win.

St Finbarr's recorded back-to-back victories over Glen Rovers for the first time in their history in the early rounds of the championship in 1965 and 1966, before clashing for the fourth successive year in the 1967 final. The Barr's, with a team built around young players such as Gerald McCarthy, Con Roche and Charlie McCarthy, played with the wind in the first half; however, the sides finished level at the interval. Goals by Bill Carroll and Mick Kenneally gave Glen Rovers a lead that they would not relinquish, with goalkeeper Finbarr O'Neill's performance being singled out for particular praise in the local press. The win gave the Glen their 21st championship title. The saga continued with three successive semi-final meetings between 1971 and 1973, with the Glen claiming the series by 2–1. A decade

"It's great to beat the Glen in a final."

— Gerald McCarthy quoted in the Cork Examiner after the 1977 final.

Arguably, the rivalry reached its peak on 18 September 1977 when the Glen and the Barr's clashed in front of a record-breaking attendance of 34,151 in the 1977 final. Glen Rovers entered the game as the reigning All-Ireland champions and took an early lead after Mick Ryan pointed after just 25 seconds. A Red Crowley goal gave them a slender 1–5 to 0–6 half-time lead. Remarkably, the Glen failed to score in the second half as Christy Ryan kick-started the St Finbarr's challenge with a 35th-minute goal. A series of long-range points, including a 100-yard effort from John Allen, powered St Finbarr's to a 1–17 to 1–5 victory, and a first final win over the Glen since 1955.

=== 1980-1988 ===
The start of a new decade in 1980 ushered in an unprecedented era of dominance by St Finbarr's over Glen Rovers. When the sides met on 12 October 1980 in the 1980 final, St Finbarr's were presented with the chance of winning the double, having earlier secured the County Football Championship title. The Barr's, playing with a slight wind advantage, were the first team to settle into attack and built up a decent lead. Charlie McCarthy missed a goal chance in the 20th minute; however, the Glen also missed a clear-cut goal opportunity and trailed by 0–7 to 0–2 at the interval. Glen Rovers staged a recovery in the second half; however, they again missed several goal opportunities before goals from Liam Mulcahy and John Buckley levelled matters in the 52nd minute. Closing points from Jimmy Barry-Murphy and Éamonn Fitzpatrick secured a 1–9 to 2–4 win for St Finbarr's. It was the first time that Glen Rovers had gone three years without winning the championship.

For the second successive year, Glen Rovers and St Finbarr's faced each other in a final on 13 September 1981. The Glen, in spite of losing the final to the same opposition the previous year, were installed as the favourites, and benefited from a light breeze in the first half. Two early points from Glen Rovers in the second half put St Finbarr's under severe pressure. After being switched to full-forward, Christy Ryan scored a goal in the 47th-minute, which appeared to sound the death knell for the Glen. 20 seconds later, the sliotar fell to Paddy Ring who brought the Glen right back into the match with a goal of his own. A couple of Bertie O'Brien points restored confidence to the Barr's, who ended up retaining the title after a 1–12 to 1–9 win. It was the first time that they had beaten Glen Rovers in back-to-back finals.

Defeats of the Glen at various stages of the championships in 1983 and 1984 cemented the St Finbarr's dominance over their rivals and they had the chance to make it five straight wins when the sides clashed in the final on 16 October 1988, having both started the championship as rank outsiders. The Glen got off to a great start with Ger O'Riordan pointing from the very first attack of the game; however, the Barr's hit back with three points in rapid succession. Two quick goals by Éamonn Fitzpatrick and Tim Finn made it double scores of 2–10 to 0–8 at half-time in favour of the Barr's. Both sides exchanged goals in the second half, with Pat Horgan getting a late consolation goal for the Glen who lost by 3–18 to 2–14.

=== 1988-present ===
"The past 20 years or so may have seen the wealth spread more evenly in the senior hurling championship...but the aristocracy can still put on a great show."

— Evening Echo (23 August 2010).

That 1988 clash was the last occasion in which Glen Rovers and St Finbarr's met in the final as both teams endured a downturn in terms of success. There have been eight championship matches between since then, with the Glen reasserting their traditional dominance over the Barr's with five wins to one. There have been two drawn matches in the intervening period. Their back-door clash in the 2017 championship was described in the Evening Echo as "one of the great games of the modern era and a throwback to the glory days of old." A stoppage-time goal by David Cunningham secured a 1–22 to 4–11 victory for the Glen, and consigned St Finbarr's to the relegation play-offs.

== Honours, results and records ==
=== Honours ===
County honours
Competition	Glen Rovers		St Finbarr's	
Competition	Titles	Year	Titles	Year
Senior Championship	27	1934, 1935, 1936, 1937, 1938, 1939, 1940, 1941, 1944, 1945, 1948, 1949, 1950, 1953, 1954, 1958, 1959, 1960, 1962, 1964, 1967, 1969, 1972, 1976, 1989, 2015, 2016	25	1899, 1904, 1905, 1906, 1919, 1922, 1923, 1926, 1932, 1933, 1942, 1943, 1946, 1947, 1955, 1965, 1968, 1974, 1977, 1980, 1981, 1982, 1984, 1988, 1993, 2022
Intermediate Championship	7	1925, 1954, 1956, 1957, 1958, 1961, 1965	1	1990
Junior Championship	2	1924, 1950	3	1902, 1903, 1956
County total	36		29	
National and provincial honours
All-Ireland Club Championship	2	1973, 1977	2	1975, 1978
Munster Club Championship	3	1964, 1972, 1976	4	1965, 1974, 1977, 1980
National and provincial total	5		6	
Combined total
Combined total	41		35	

=== All-time results ===
Date	Venue	Matches			Competition
Date	Venue	Team 1	Score	Team 2	Competition
7 October 1934	Cork Athletic Grounds	Glen Rovers	3–2 – 0–6	St Finbarr's	Cork SHC final
25 August 1935	Cork Athletic Grounds	Glen Rovers	1–8 – 0–4	St Finbarr's	Cork SHC second round
13 July 1941	Cork Athletic Grounds	Glen Rovers	3–4 – 1–4	St Finbarr's	Cork SHC second round
19 September 1943	Cork Athletic Grounds	St Finbarr's	3–2 – 0–6	Glen Rovers	Cork SHC semi-final
22 October 1944	Cork Athletic Grounds	Glen Rovers	5–7 – 3–3	St Finbarr's	Cork SHC final
19 August 1945	Cork Athletic Grounds	Glen Rovers	10–8 – 2–3	St Finbarr's	Cork SHC semi-final
16 November 1946	Cork Athletic Grounds	St Finbarr's	2–3 – 2–1	Glen Rovers	Cork SHC final
31 July 1949	Cork Athletic Grounds	Glen Rovers	3–11 – 0–7	St Finbarr's	Cork SHC semi-final
17 September 1950	Cork Athletic Grounds	Glen Rovers	2–8 – 0–5	St Finbarr's	Cork SHC final
25 April 1954	Cork Athletic Grounds	Glen Rovers	3–9 – 1–3	St Finbarr's	Cork SHC first round
9 October 1955	Cork Athletic Grounds	Glen Rovers	2–6 – 1–9	St Finbarr's	Cork SHC final
16 October 1955	Cork Athletic Grounds	St Finbarr's	7–8 – 2–6	Glen Rovers	Cork SHC final replay
2 September 1956	Cork Athletic Grounds	Glen Rovers	7–6 – 3–3	St Finbarr's	Cork SHC semi-final
21 September 1958	Cork Athletic Grounds	Glen Rovers	4–6 – 3–5	St Finbarr's	Cork SHC final
11 October 1964	Cork Athletic Grounds	Glen Rovers	3–12 – 2–7	St Finbarr's	Cork SHC final
13 June 1965	Cork Athletic Grounds	St Finbarr's	3–9 – 1–6	Glen Rovers	Cork SHC second round
31 July 1966	Cork Athletic Grounds	St Finbarr's	4–13 – 4–7	Glen Rovers	Cork SHC quarter-final
8 October 1967	Cork Athletic Grounds	Glen Rovers	3–9 – 1–9	St Finbarr's	Cork SHC final
27 August 1971	Cork Athletic Grounds	St Finbarr's	4–14 – 3–9	Glen Rovers	Cork SHC semi-final
29 October 1972	Cork Athletic Grounds	Glen Rovers	1–9 – 1–4	St Finbarr's	Cork SHC semi-final
26 August 1973	Cork Athletic Grounds	Glen Rovers	4–13 – 3–10	St Finbarr's	Cork SHC semi-final
18 September 1977	Páirc Uí Chaoimh	St Finbarr's	1–17 – 1–5	Glen Rovers	Cork SHC final
7 April 1978	Páirc Uí Chaoimh	Glen Rovers	1–14 – 1–12	St Finbarr's	Cork SHC group stage
13 August 1978	Páirc Uí Chaoimh	Glen Rovers	2–11 – 2–10	St Finbarr's	Cork SHC semi-final
8 June 1979	Páirc Uí Chaoimh	Glen Rovers	1–9 – 1–9	St Finbarr's	Cork SHC group stage
12 October 1980	Páirc Uí Chaoimh	St Finbarr's	1–9 – 2–4	Glen Rovers	Cork SHC final
13 September 1981	Páirc Uí Chaoimh	St Finbarr's	1–12 – 1–9	Glen Rovers	Cork SHC final
25 September 1983	Páirc Uí Chaoimh	St Finbarr's	1–20 – 2–9	Glen Rovers	Cork SHC semi-final
11 May 1984	Páirc Uí Chaoimh	St Finbarr's	0–19 – 2–12	Glen Rovers	Cork SHC first round
16 October 1988	Páirc Uí Chaoimh	St Finbarr's	3–18 – 2–14	Glen Rovers	Cork SHC final
27 July 1996	Páirc Uí Chaoimh	St Finbarr's	0–13 – 0–13	Glen Rovers	Cork SHC quarter-final
24 August 1996	Páirc Uí Chaoimh	Glen Rovers	1–13 – 1–10	St Finbarr's	Cork SHC quarter-final replay
21 August 2010	Páirc Uí Chaoimh	Glen Rovers	2–15 – 4–9	St Finbarr's	Cork SHC round 4
4 September 2010	Páirc Uí Chaoimh	Glen Rovers	2–14 – 1–11	St Finbarr's	Cork SHC round 4 replay
27 May 2012	Páirc Uí Chaoimh	St Finbarr's	0–18 – 0–9	Glen Rovers	Cork SHC round 1
2 June 2013	Páirc Uí Chaoimh	Glen Rovers	3–18 – 2–15	St Finbarr's	Cork SHC round 1
24 June 2017	Páirc Uí Rinn	Glen Rovers	1–22 – 4–11	St Finbarr's	Cork SHC round 2B
1 August 2020	Páirc Uí Chaoimh	Glen Rovers	3–20 – 0–15	St Finbarr's	Cork PSHC group stage

=== Records ===
- First championship meeting: Glen Rovers 3–2 – 0–6 St Finbarr's – Cork SHC final, 7 October 1934
- Highest scoring game:
  - Glen Rovers 3–18 – 2–15 St Finbarr's, Cork SHC round 1, Páirc Uí Chaoimh, 2 June 2013
  - Glen Rovers 1–22 – 4–11 St Finbarr's, Cork SHC round 2B, Páirc Uí Rinn, 24 June 2017
- Largest winning margin:
  - Glen Rovers 10–8 – 2–3 St Finbarr's, Cork SHC semi-final, Cork Athletic Grounds, 19 August 1945
  - St Finbarr's: St Finbarr's 7–8 – 2–6 Glen Rovers, Cork SHC final replay, Cork Athletic Grounds, 16 October 1955
- Most consecutive wins: St Finbarr's: 5 (12 October 1980 – 27 July 1996)
- Longest undefeated run: St Finbarr's: 7 (8 June 1979 – 27 July 1996; 5 wins and 2 draws)
- Top scorer: 3–53 – Patrick Horgan (Glen Rovers)
- Highest attendance: 34,151 - St Finbarr's 1–17 - 1–5 Glen Rovers, Cork SHC final, Páirc Uí Chaoimh, 18 September 1977
