= John Lyons (hurler) =

Irish hurler

Personal information
- Native name: Seán Ó Liatháin (Irish)
- Nickname: The Gentleman
- Born: 30 September 1924 Blackpool, Cork, Ireland
- Died: 11 June 2005 (aged 80) Model Farm Road, Cork, Ireland
- Occupation: Clerk
- Height: 5 ft 11 in (180 cm)

Sport
- Sport: Hurling
- Position: Full-back
Club
- Years: Club
- 1944-1961: Glen Rovers
Club titles
	Football	Hurling
Cork titles	1	10
Inter-county
Years	County	Apps (scores)
1946-1960	Cork	26 (0-00)
Inter-county titles
- Munster titles: 5
- All-Irelands: 4
- NHL: 1

John Lyons (30 September 1924 – 11 June 2005) was an Irish hurler whose league and championship career with the Cork senior team spanned fourteen years from 1946 to 1960.

Born near Blackpool in Cork, Lyons first played competitive hurling during his schooling at the North Monastery. Here he was a key member of the college team that completed the final two stages of winning four successive Harty Cup titles. Immediately after leaving school, Lyons joined the Glen Rovers senior team. In a club career that spanned three decades he won ten county senior championship medals, serving as captain of the team on two occasions. As a Gaelic footballer with the Glen's sister club, St. Nicholas', he also won a county senior championship medal. Lyons retired from club hurling at the age of thirty-eight following the Glen's failure to secure a fourth successive championship in 1961.

Having never played minor or junior hurling for Cork, Lyons made his debut on the inter-county scene at the age of twenty-three when he was picked on the Cork senior team for the first time in 1946. He won his first All-Ireland medal that year, albeit as a non-playing substitute, before later being dropped from the panel. Lyons was recalled to the team in 1950 and retained the full-back position for a decade, winning a further three All-Ireland medals in succession. He also won five Munster medals and one National Hurling League medal. Lyons played his last game for Cork in July 1960.

Lyons was moving towards the end of his career when he was chosen for the Munster inter-provincial team in 1954. He was a regular at full-back over the course of the next five years and won three Railway Cup medals.

== Playing career ==
=== Club ===
==== Early successes ====
Lyons made his senior debut with the Glen Rovers club during the 1944 championship. Three-in-a-row hopefuls and fierce southside rivals St. Finbarr's provided the opposition as the Glen qualified for the county final. The game started at a furious pace and inside a minute Denis Leahy had the ball in the St. Finbarr's net. This lead was increased to 2–3 after 27 minutes. "The Barrs" replied with a goal and at half time the Glen led by 4–3 to 1–0. A St. Finbarr's goal at the three-quarter mark was immediately cancelled out by an own goal, however, the final quarter was fought out score for score. At the final whistle Glen Rovers were the champions by 5–7 to 3-3 and Lyons had collected his first county senior championship medal.

Divisional side Carrigdhoun provided the opposition as Glen Rovers reached the 1945 championship final in search of their tenth title. In what was probably the most exciting decider in which the club had been involved in so far, the Glen were five goals ahead after 25 minutes having played with a gale-force wind, however, Carrigdhoun fought back to reduce the arrears and set up an exciting finish. Lyons was singled out for praise at full-back as Glen Rovers retained the championship title following a 4–10 to 5–3 victory.

==== Glen Rovers march on ====
After defeat by St. Finbarr's in the 1946 championship final, Glen Rovers saw a number of changes to the team when they next contested the decider in 1948. Retirement and emigration and forced a number of changes, with Lyons being moved to the left corner-back position. Glen veterans Jack Lynch and Johnny Quirke were to the fore in securing the double scores 5–7 to 3–2 victory over roll of honour leaders Blackrock.

Glen Rovers were presented with their chance of retaining their title when they faced divisional side Imokilly in the 1949 championship decider. On a day of incessant rain, the game was described as one of the best of the year. Donie Twomey and Jack Lynch were the stars of the team as they bagged 5-2 between them. Christy Ring scored the Glen's sixth goal of the game to secure the 6–5 to 0–14 victory. It was a fourth championship medal for Lyons.

Southside rivals St. Finbarr's were the opponents as Glen Rovers were determined to make it three titles in-a-row in the 1950 championship final. St. Finbarr's had the advantage of a very strong breeze in the first half and mounted attack after attack on the Glen goal but failed to raise the green flag. The Glen backs gave one of the finest displays of defensive hurling ever seen in the championship and kept the southsiders tally for the first half to 0–4. "The Barrs" added just one further point to their tally after the interval. The 2–8 to 0–5 victory secured a third successive championship title for the club and a fifth winners' medal for Lyons, who also had the honour of lifting the Seán Óg Murphy Cup as captain.

Sarsfields ended the Glen's hopes of four-in-a-row in 1951, while defeat in the first round of 1952 looked like heralding a fallow period. The club returned stronger than ever when they qualified for the 1953 championship final where they faced Sarsfields once again. After a slow start Glen Rovers gave an exhibition of hurling all over the field, with Lyons, Dave Creedon, Seán French and Seán O'Brien proving impregnable in defence. The 8–5 to 4–3 victory secured his sixth championship medal.

In 1954 Glen Rovers reached their 17th championship final in twenty years. Blackrock fielded a young team, however, Glen Rovers had eight inter-county players on their team. In spite of this, Blackrock stood up to the champions and the result remained in doubt to the end. A 3–7 to 3–2 victory secured a seventh championship medal for Lyons, who was one of the stars of the game in defence.

==== Football honours ====
Lyons was appointed captain of the Glen's sister Gaelic football club St. Nicholas' in 1954. It proved a successful championship campaign as St. Nick's qualified for the county final with Clonakilty providing the opposition. Clonakilty had been the form team of the previous decade, having won seven county senior championship titles between 1939 and 1952. They were now a team in decline and were defeated by 2–11 to 0–3. Lyons, as captain of the team, retains the distinction of being the only player to captain a team to championship victories in both hurling and football in Cork.

==== Three championships in-a-row ====
Glen Rovers lost the next two championship deciders before facing St. Finbarr's in the 1958 county final. Lyons was appointed captain for the second time in his career and lead the charge from the full-back line. The Glen were lining out without Christy Ring and Joe Twomey as they had been sent to the line in the semi-final victory. In one of the great championship deciders in Cork, Glen Rovers won by 4–6 to 3–5. It was an eighth championship medal for Lyons who, once again, had the honour of receiving the cup.

Lyons retained the club captaincy in 1959 as Glen Rovers faced Blackrock in another county championship decider. Once again the game went to the wire and it was Christy Ring who scored the winning goal with four minutes remaining. His tally of 1-6 was vital in securing the 3–11 to 3–5 victory. It was a ninth winners' medal for Lyons and his third time captaining the Glen to victory.

A third successive championship beckoned in 1960 as Glen Rovers faced University College Cork in the championship decider. With time running out the Glen were behind, however, Christy Ring pointed a free from the sideline to level the game. Johnny Clifford secured the lead when his sideline cut went straight over the bar. He gave the Glen a two-point lead straight from the puck-out when his shot sailed over the bar again. The 3–8 to 1–12 victory gave Lyons his tenth and final championship medal.

=== Inter-county ===
==== Debut season ====
Having never played minor hurling for Cork, Lyons was added to the senior panel in 1946. He made his championship debut on 30 June 1946 when he was introduced as a substitute in Cork's 3–9 to 1-6 Munster semi-final defeat of Waterford. Lyons remained amongst the reserves for Cork's subsequent 3–8 to 1-3 Munster final defeat of Limerick. A subsequent defeat of Galway allowed Cork to advance to an All-Ireland final meeting with Kilkenny on 1 September 1946. Lyons remained as an unused substitute throughout the match as Cork powered to a 7–5 to 3–8 victory. In spite of playing no part in the game Lyons was later presented with his first All-Ireland medal.

==== Three-in-a-row ====
Lyons was dropped from the panel the following year, however, he was recalled in 1950 but remained as a non-playing substitute for two seasons. In 1952 he was brought onto the starting fifteen at full-back as a replacement for the retired Con Murphy. That year Tipperary were presented with the possibility of equalling Cork's record of four successive All-Ireland titles. When both sides met in that year's Munster final, Tipperary looked the likely winners as Cork failed to score for the opening quarter. Trailing by 2–5 to 0–5 at the break, Christy Ring gave an inspirational display in the second half. After being denied twice by Tipperary goalkeeper Tony Reddin, he set up Liam Dowling for a vital goal to leave Cork just a point in arrears. Cork held out for the lead and won the game by 1–11 to 2–6. It was a second Munster medal for Lyons, his first as a member of the starting fifteen. For the first time in eight years, Cork subsequently faced Dublin in the All-Ireland final on 7 September 1952. The Christy Ring-Des Ferguson duel was a highlight of the game, as Cork took a narrow 1–5 to 0-5 half-time lead after a Liam Dowling goal. Cork took complete control after the interval, with Dowling netting a second goal and Ring adding four points to the two he already scored in the first half. A 2–14 to 0–7 victory gave Lyons his second All-Ireland medal and his first on the field of play.

Cork and Tipperary renewed their rivalry in 1953, when a record crowd of over 38,000 saw them contest the final of the league. Paddy Barry and Jimmy Lynam gave Cork a comfortable lead after scoring two goals as Tipperary missed several scoring chances. Paddy Kennedy responded with two goals at the end to narrow Cork's margin of victory to 2–10 to 2–7. The victory gave Lyons a National Hurling League medal. Having already met in the league decider, Cork and Tipperary qualified to meet in the Munster final as well. Christy Ring was, once again, the star player for Cork. He had the sliotar in the Tipperary net from a 25-yards free after just a minute of play before adding eight further points, while also making a goal-line save to secure a 3–10 to 1–11 victory. It was a third Munster medal for Lyons. On 7 September 1953, Cork faced Galway in the All-Ireland final. After a slow start, which allowed Galway take an early lead, Cork regrouped and were 2–1 to 0-3 ahead at half time after goals from Josie Hartnett and Christy Ring. Galway remained close to Cork throughout the second half, however, a third goal from Tom O'Sullivan put the result beyond doubt and secured a 3–3 to 0–8 victory for Cork. It was a third All-Ireland medal for Lyons.

The 1954 Munster final saw Cork face Tipperary for the sixth consecutive season. Tipperary looked likely winners for much of the match, however, a Christy Ring shot from 20 yards was saved by goalkeeper Tony Reddin before falling to the waiting Paddy Barry who clinched the winning goal. The 2–8 to 1–8 victory gave Lyons his fourth Munster medal. After overcoming Galway in the semi-final, Cork faced Wexford in the All-Ireland final on 5 September 1954. It was their first championship meeting in over fifty years. A record crowd of 84,856 saw the sides on level terms after the first quarter. A scramble after a sideline ball resulted in a Wexford goal by Tom Ryan after 26 minutes which gave them a 1–3 to 0–5 lead. With a strong breeze in their favour in the second half, Cork looked in a very strong position. Nicky Rackard had switched from full-forward to centre-forward to curb the long clearances of Vincy Twomey. By the tenth minute points from Tim Flood and Paddy Kehoe had Wexford 1–6 to 0-5 ahead. Then a goal-bound Ring shot struck Nick O'Donnell, breaking his collarbone. Further points cut the Cork deficit to two and with four minutes left young Johnny Clifford trapped the ball on the end line, dribbled it along the ground and shot past Art Foley from a narrow angle. Injury-time points from Hartnett and Ring gave Cork a 1–9 to 1–6 victory and secured a fourth All-Ireland medal for Lyons.

==== Twilight years ====
Four-in-a-row proved beyond Cork as they were shocked by a Jimmy Smyth-inspired Clare in the 1955 Munster quarter-final. The defeat sparked several retirements and an influx of some new players to the Cork team which qualified to play reigning champions Limerick in the 1956 Munster final. With a quarter of the match remaining, Limerick were six points ahead and looked like retaining their title. Christy Ring came to the rescue for Cork and scored a hat-trick of goals in five minutes to secure a 5–5 to 3–5 victory. It was a fifth Munster medal for Lyons. For the second time in three years, Cork faced Wexford in the All-Ireland final on 23 September 1956. The game reached a climax in the closing stages as Cork were two points down. A great save by Art Foley from a Christy Ring shot was the key turning point of the game. Within a minute of that save the sliotar dropped into Foley again and, after it was cleared, it made its way up the pitch and was buried in the back of the Cork net by Nicky Rackard giving Wexford a 2–14 to 2–8 victory. With seconds remaining in the final and Wexford holding onto a two-point lead,

Following defeat in the 1956 All-Ireland final, many expected Cork to go into decline. In spite of this the team qualified for the 1957 Munster final. Cork lost that game to an up-and-coming Waterford side by 1–11 to 1–6.

In 1958 Lyons was still at full-back, however, Cork exited the championship at the hands of Tipperary in the Munster semi-final. The following year Cork qualified to play Waterford in the Munster final. Christy Ring contributed 1–5, including a late goal which looked like turning the game in Cork's favour, however, Waterford held out for a 3–9 to 2–9 victory.

Lyons was in his 37th year when he was named on the Cork's championship fifteen once again in 1960. After facing each other on the league final, both Cork and Tipperary renewed their rivalry in the subsequent Munster final. Described as the toughest game of hurling ever played, Cork enjoyed most of the possession in the first half, however, Tipperary led by a goal at the interval thanks to the accuracy of Jimmy Doyle. They stretched their lead to five points in the final quarter, however, a last-minute Cork goal left the result in doubt once again. Tipperary eventually won a gruelling contest by 4–13 to 4–11. Lyons retired from inter-county hurling following this defeat.

=== Inter-provincial ===
Lyons was chosen at full-back on the 1954 Munster inter-provincial team. Munster qualified for the championship decider in search of a record-breaking seventh successive title. In a low-scoring game Leinster won by 0–9 to 0-5 and claimed their first Railway Cup title since 1941.

In 1955 Lyons retained his place on the starting fifteen as Munster qualified to play Connacht in the final. Christy Ring was the key player for the southern province and scored a goal when he cupped the sliotar to the net after falling. He added three more points before Josie Hartentt scored the decisive goal in the 6–8 to 3–4 victory. It was a first winners' medal for Lyons. Munster endured a heavy defeat at the hands of Leinster in the 1956 decider. After trailing by 3–5 to 0–2 after twenty-five minutes, Munster eventually lost by 5–11 to 1–7.

By 1957, Lyons was on the Munster's starting fifteen once again. Christy Ring's tally of 3-5 was enough to beat the eastern province on his own. His first goal came after he grabbed the sliotar some 40 yards out and drove it past Art Foley. His second was a ground snap shot, while his third goal was a cut which he took on the turn after Foley lost the sliotar. The 5–7 to 2–5 victory gave Lyons his second Railway Cup medal.

Munster and Leinster met for the third successive year in the 1958 Railway Cup final. Munster were underdogs going into the game, with Lyons in his usual full-back position. A close game developed, however, Lyons collected a third Railway Cup medal following a 3–7 to 3–5 victory.

== Honours ==
=== Player ===
North Monastery

- Dr Harty Cup: 1941, 1942, 1943

St Nicholas'

- Cork Senior Football Championship (1): 1954 (c)

Glen Rovers

- Cork Senior Hurling Championship (10): 1944, 1945, 1948, 1949, 1950 (c), 1953, 1954, 1958 (c), 1959 (c), 1960

Cork

- All-Ireland Senior Hurling Championship (4): 1946, 1952, 1953, 1954
- Munster Senior Hurling Championship (5): 1946, 1952, 1953, 1954, 1956
- National Hurling League (1): 1952-53

Munster

- Railway Cup (3): 1955, 1957, 1958

=== Selector ===
Glen Rovers

- Cork Senior Hurling Championship (1): 1989
