= Jimmy Lynam =

Irish hurler and Gaelic footballer (1925–2026)

Personal information
- Native name: Séamus Ó Laigheanáin (Irish)
- Born: 1 October 1925 Blackpool, Cork, Ireland
- Died: 23 August 2026 (aged 100) Whites Cross, County Cork, Ireland
- Height: 5 ft 10 in (178 cm)

Sport
- Sport: Hurling
- Position: Right corner-forward
Club
- Years: Club
- 1944-1960: Glen Rovers
Club titles
	Football	Hurling
Cork titles	1	7
Inter-county
Years	County	Apps (scores)
1949-1953	Cork	5 (1–02)
Inter-county titles
- Munster titles: 2
- All-Irelands: 2
- NHL: 1

James Lynam (1 October 1925 – 23 August 2026) was an Irish hurler who played for club side Glen Rovers and at inter-county level with the Cork senior hurling team.

== Career ==
A member of the Glen Rovers club in Blackpool, Lynam had just turned 19 when he won his first County Championship title in 1944. He claimed a further six winners' medals before his retirement from the club scene in 1960. Lynam first played for the Cork senior hurling team when he was selected as a reserve for the 1950 Munster Championship. He won the first of successive Munster Championship medals in 1952, before claiming his first All-Ireland title after coming on as a substitute for Liam Abernethy in the 1952 final defeat of Dublin. Lynam collected further silverware with a National League title in 1953, before winning a second All-Ireland title, this time as a reserve, after Cork's defeat of Galway in the 1953 final.

== Death ==
Lynam died on 23 August 2026, at the age of 100.

== Honours ==
St Nicholas

- Cork Senior Football Championship (1): 1954

Glen Rovers

- Cork Senior Hurling Championship: 1944, 1945, 1948, 1949, 1953, 1954, 1960

Cork

- All-Ireland Senior Hurling Championship: 1952, 1953
- Munster Senior Hurling Championship: 1952, 1953
- National Hurling League: 1952-53

Achievements
Preceded by Johnny Everard	Oldest living All-Ireland medal winner 2021-2026	Succeeded by Dick Rockett
