= Johnny Clifford =

Irish hurler and coach

Personal information
- Native name: Seán Ó Clúmháin (Irish)
- Nickname: The silver fox
- Born: 1934 Blackpool, Cork, Ireland
- Died: 19 October 2007 (aged 73) South Douglas Road, Cork, Ireland
- Occupation: Factory employee
- Height: 5 ft 7 in (170 cm)

Sport
- Sport: Hurling
- Position: Right corner-forward
Club
- Years: Club
- 1951-1960: Glen Rovers
Club titles
	Football	Hurling
Cork titles	1	3
Inter-county
Years	County	Apps (scores)
1953-1956	Cork	5 (3-05)
Inter-county titles
- Munster titles: 2
- All-Irelands: 2

John Clifford (1934 – 19 October 2007) was an Irish hurler and hurling coach. After All-Ireland Championship victories as a player and manager during a five-decade association with the Cork senior hurling team, he is regarded as a "Cork legend."

After beginning his career at club level with Glen Rovers, Clifford joined the Cork minor team as a 15-year-old in 1950, captaining the team to the All-Ireland Minor Championship in 1951. He was almost immediately promoted to the Cork senior team and won his first All-Ireland Championship as non-playing substitute in 1953 before claiming a second winners' medal on the field of the play in 1954 after scoring the winning goal in the final. A severe head injury ended Clifford's inter-county career in 1956, by which time he had also won two Munster Championship medals. His club career ended in 1960; however, in spite of being brief he claimed a full set of available county championship medals including minor, junior, intermediate and three senior triumphs.

After his playing career, Clifford found success as both a club and inter-county coach and selector. His association as a mentor with the Glen Rovers senior team spanned three decades and culminated with the winning of All-Ireland Club Championship titles in 1973 and 1977. Clifford enjoyed three separate tenures as coach of the Cork senior team, while he also served as a selector in an association that lasted from the 1960s until the 1990s. During that time he was involved in two All-Ireland Championship-winning teams, while he also coached the Cork minor team to the All-Ireland Minor Championship in 1985.

== Playing career ==
=== Glen Rovers ===
Clifford began his hurling career in the locally organised North Parish Leagues in the 1940s before later coming to prominence at colleges level with the North Monastery. Around the same time he joined the hugely successful Glen Rovers minor team that claimed three successive county championships between 1950 and 1952. Clifford had just turned 16 when he was also drafted onto the Glen Rovers junior hurling that claimed the county championship title after a 4-06 to 3-00 victory over Mallow in the 1950 final.

Still in his second of three years with the minor team, Clifford was promoted to the Glen Rovers senior team in advance of the 1951 County Championship. He made his debut on 15 April 1951 when he scored five points in an 8-08 to 0-03 first round defeat of Seandún and was also amongst the scorers when Glen Rovers lost the final to Sarsfields. Clifford was still just 19 years old when he lined out in his second senior final in 1953, ending the game with his first winners' medal after scoring a goal in the 8-05 to 4-03 victory over Sarsfields. Glen Rovers retained the title after a five-point win over Blackrock in the 1964 final, with Clifford claiming a second successive winners' medal before ending the season by completing the double after winning a county football championship medal with the Glen's sister club St. Nicholas'.

After losing back-to-back finals in 1955 and 1956, a series of career-threatening injuries saw Clifford leave the Glen Rovers senior team. He linked up with the club's intermediate team and secured the complete set of county championship titles after claiming a winners' medal when the Glen defeated Carrigaline in the 1958 intermediate final. A return to full fitness saw Clifford earn a recall to the Glen Rovers senior team. He claimed a third senior winners' medal after lining out at right wing-forward in the 3-08 to 1-12 defeat of University College Cork in the 1960 final.

=== Cork ===
Clifford first played for Cork as a member of the minor team during the 1950 Munster Championship. He made his first appearance for the team on 26 June 1950 when he scored three points from left wing-forward in the 3-07 to 2-06 defeat by Waterford. Clifford was appointed captain of the team in 1951 and claimed a Munster Championship medal after scoring 2-04 in the 5-11 to 1-03 victory over Limerick. He later won an All-Ireland Championship medal after leading Cork to a 4-05 to 1-08 victory over Galway in the All-Ireland final. Clifford's minor career ended after a defeat by Tipperary in the 1952 Munster Championship.

After not being included on the Cork panel for the 1953 Munster Championship, Clifford was drafted onto the team as a substitute for the 1953 All-Ireland final against Galway. He remained on the bench but ended the game with a winners' medal after the 3-03 to 0-08 victory. Clifford made his senior debut on 15 November 1953 in a 6-08 to 5-06 defeat by Dublin in the second round of the 1953-54 National League. Later that season he made his first championship appearance and claimed a Munster Championship medal after scoring three points in the 2-08 to 1-08 victory over Tipperary in the final. Clifford ended the season by winning a second successive All-Ireland winners' medal after scoring the winning goal in Cork's All-Ireland final victory over Wexford.

Clifford was an automatic inclusion on the Cork starting fifteen for the 1955 Munster Championship; however, a series of injuries brought his inter-county career to end during the 1955-56 National League.

== Managerial career ==
=== Glen Rovers ===
After the premature ending of his club career, Clifford became involved as a coach and selector at all levels with Glen Rovers but particularly with the senior team. He enjoyed his first success as a mentor when Glen Rovers claimed the 1964 Championship after a defeat of St. Finbarr's, before later beating Mount Sion by six points to win the inaugural Munster Club Championship. After surrendering their titles the following year, Clifford was again part of the management team that saw Glen Rovers claim the championship titles in 1967 and 1969 after respective defeats of St. Finbarr's and University College Cork.

Clifford claimed a fourth championship title as a selector after a defeat of Youghal in 1972 before later helping the Glen to a second Munster Club Championship title after victory over Roscrea. He ended the 1972-73 season by helping steer the club to their first All-Ireland Club Championship after a 2-18 to 2-08 defeat of St. Rynagh's in the All-Ireland final. After two final defeats over the following three years, Clifford claimed a fifth county championship title in 1976, this time as team trainer with Donie O'Donovan. He later helped steer the club to a third Munster Club Championship and a second All-Ireland Club Championship after a 2-12 to 0-08 victory over Camross in the All-Ireland final replay. Clifford concentrated on inter-county coaching and management following this victory, however, he remained close to his home club and returned as manager for one last time in 1993.

=== Cork ===
Clifford's first involvement with the Cork senior team came during the 1967-68 hurling season when he served on the management team as a selector. After a nine-point defeat by Tipperary in the 1968 Munster final, his one-year term came to an end. After success at club level with Glen Rovers, Clifford again joined the Cork senior team in October 1976. Cork were the reigning All-Ireland champions and, after helping steer Cork to a 4-15 to 4-10 defeat of league champions Clare in the 1977 Munster final, he was again on the sideline when Cork secured a second successive All-Ireland final victory over Wexford to retain their All-Ireland title.

After not being a member of the backroom team for Cork's third successive All-Ireland victory in 1978, Clifford was a late addition to the selection committee as a replacement for Christy Ring following his death in March 1979. Cork completed a record-equalling five-in-a-row of Munster Championship victories in 1979; however, the team failed in their attempt at securing a fourth successive All-Ireland Championship after a 2-14 to 1-13 All-Ireland semi-final defeat by Galway. Clifford was retained as a selector for a second successive season, with Cork claiming the 1979-80 National League title after a defeat of Limerick.

On 10 November 1982, Clifford was appointed coach of the Cork senior team. He described the position as "the most demanding I have ever agreed to tackle" and said that his aim was "to win the All-Ireland." Cork later retained the Munster Championship for a second successive year after a 3-22 to 0-12 defeat of Waterford in the 1983 Munster final, before narrowly losing the All-Ireland final to Kilkenny. While the players hoped that Clifford would remain on as coach, he was replaced at the end of the season. However, the fact that he had undergone a heart bypass operation was not cited as not being the reason behind his failure to be reappointed.

After a one-year absence from inter-county management, Clifford returned to partner Charlie McCarthy as joint-coach of the Cork minor team. Success was instant, with Cork claiming their first Munster Minor Championship in six years after a five-point victory over Tipperary before later adding the All-Ireland Minor Championship title following a 3-10 to 0-12 win over Wexford in the final.

Clifford was appointed coach of the Cork senior team for the second time on 22 October 1985 following a mass clear-out of the previous selection committee. Expectations were low, but Cork secured a record-equalling fifth successive Munster Championship after a three-point win over Clare in the 1986 final. Clifford later guided Cork to an unlikely All-Ireland final win over Galway. After surrendering their titles to Tipperary in the 1987 Munster final, he was retained as coach for a third successive season. However, after several years of poor health he announced his shock resignation on 10 March 1988.

On 23 November 1993, Clifford made a return to inter-county management when he was appointed Cork senior hurling coach for the third time in his career. While many viewed the team as being in transition, Clifford was confident that Cork would win "at least" one All-Ireland title during his two-year term. In what was his least successful spell with the team, Cork lost out to Limerick in the first round of the 1994 Munster Championship, while a late Clare goal put Cork out of the 1995 Munster Championship at the first hurdle, to bring Clifford's tenure as manager to an end.

=== Westmeath ===
In October 1991, Clifford was given total control of all hurling training and preparation in Westmeath when he was appointed trainer and manager of the senior team, while also taking charge of the under-21 and minor teams. After having little success with the underage teams, he guided the seniors to an All-Ireland home final defeat by eventual champions Carlow in the All-Ireland B Championship.

== Personal life and death ==
Clifford spent his entire working life with Dunlop's and was regarded as a highly effective shop steward prior to the factory's closure in 1983.

He suffered from a heart condition for over 25 years and underwent a heart bypass operation in 1984. Clifford died in his home on the South Douglas Road after suffering a brief illness on 19 October 2007. He was survived by his wife Louise and two daughters.

== Honours ==
=== Player ===
St. Nicholas'

- Cork Senior Football Championship (1): 1954

Glen Rovers

- Cork Senior Hurling Championship (3): 1953, 1954, 1960
- Cork Intermediate Hurling Championship (1): 1958
- Cork Junior Hurling Championship (1): 1950
- Cork Minor Hurling Championship (3): 1950, 1951, 1952

Cork

- All-Ireland Senior Hurling Championship (2): 1953, 1954
- Munster Senior Hurling Championship (2): 1953, 1954
- All-Ireland Minor Hurling Championship (1): 1951 (c)
- Munster Minor Hurling Championship (1): 1951 (c)

=== Management ===
Glen Rovers

- All-Ireland Senior Club Hurling Championship (2): 1973, 1977
- Munster Senior Club Hurling Championship (3): 1964, 1972, 1976
- Cork Senior Hurling Championship (5): 1964, 1967, 1969, 1972, 1976

Cork

- All-Ireland Senior Hurling Championship (2): 1977, 1986
- Munster Senior Hurling Championship (4): 1977, 1979, 1983, 1986
- National Hurling League (1): 1979-80
- All-Ireland Minor Hurling Championship (1): 1985
- Munster Minor Hurling Championship (1): 1985

Achievements
Preceded by Pat Lennon	All-Ireland Minor Hurling Final winning captain 1951	Succeeded by Tony Wall
Preceded by Dermot Healy	All-Ireland Senior Hurling Final winning coach 1986	Succeeded by Cyril Farrell
Sporting positions
Preceded by Gerald McCarthy	Cork Senior Hurling Coach; 1982-1983	Succeeded by Michael O'Brien
Preceded by Michael O'Brien	Cork Senior Hurling Coach; 1985-1988	Succeeded by Charlie McCarthy
Preceded by Joachim Kelly	Westmeath Senior Hurling Coach; 1991-1992	Succeeded by Ray Smith
Preceded by Michael O'Brien	Cork Senior Hurling Coach; 1993-1995	Succeeded by Jimmy Barry-Murphy
