= Donie O'Donovan =

Personal information
- Native name: Dónall Ó Donnabháin (Irish)
- Nickname: Donie
- Born: 31 January 1926 Dillon's Cross, Cork, Ireland
- Died: 28 May 1999 (aged 73) Wellington Road, Cork, Ireland

Sport
- Sport: Gaelic football
- Position: Right corner-forward
Clubs
- Years: Club
- St. Nicholas'; Glen Rovers
Club titles
	Football	Hurling
Cork titles	3	6
Munster titles	1	0
Inter-county
Years	County	Apps (scores)
1947-1955	Cork	15 (5-03)
Inter-county titles
- Munster titles: 2
- All-Irelands: 0
- NFL: 1

Daniel Joseph O'Donovan (31 January 1926 – 28 May 1999) was an Irish Gaelic football manager and player. He played football with his local club St. Nicholas' and was a member of the Cork senior inter-county team from 1948 until 1955. O'Donovan managed Cork to the All-Ireland title in 1973.

== Biography ==
Born Daniel Joseph O'Donovan at 150 Old Youghal Road, Dillon's Cross, Cork into a family with strong sporting and Irish republican background. He was a nephew of Cork IRA officer Dan "Sandow" O'Donovan. He followed in the footsteps of his father and grandfather and became a carpenter by trade. He married Cork camogie player Sheila Cahill in the 1950s, and they had three sons. The eldest, Diarmuid O'Donovan is Assistant CEO of the Evening Echo and a sports columnist with that newspaper.

== Honours ==
=== Player ===
St. Nicholas

- Munster Senior Club Football Championship: 1966
- Cork Senior Football Championship: 1954, 1965, 1966

Glen Rovers

- Cork Senior Hurling Championship: 1944, 1948, 1949, 1950, 1953, 1954

Cork

- Munster Senior Football Championship: 1949, 1952
- National Football League: 1951-52

Munster

- Railway Cup: 1949

=== Management ===
Glen Rovers

- Cork Senior Hurling Championship: 1989

St. Nicholas

- Munster Senior Club Football Championship: 1966
- Cork Senior Football Championship: 1965, 1966

Cork

- All-Ireland Senior Football Championship: 1973
- Munster Senior Football Championship: 1966, 1967, 1973, 1974

Munster

- Railway Cup: 1972

Achievements
Preceded by Joe Keohane	All-Ireland Senior Football Final winning coach 1973	Succeeded by Kevin Heffernan
