= Joe Twomey =

Irish hurler

Personal information
- Native name: Seosamh Ó Tuama (Irish)
- Born: 13 November 1931 Blackpool, Cork, Ireland
- Died: 7 April 2005 (aged 73) Gurranabraher, Cork, Ireland
- Occupation: Dunlops employee
- Height: 5 ft 10 in (178 cm)

Sport
- Sport: Hurling
- Position: Midfield
Club
- Years: Club
- 1950-1961: Glen Rovers
Club titles
| | Football | Hurling |
| Cork titles | 1 | 6 |
Inter-county*
| Years | County | Apps (scores) |
| 1952-1960 | Cork | 10 (0-5) |
Inter-county titles
- Munster titles: 2
- All-Irelands: 2
- NHL: 1
- *Inter County team apps and scores correct as of 14:05, 31 July 2016.

Joseph Christopher Twomey (13 November 1931 – 7 April 2005) was an Irish hurler. At club level, he played with Glen Rovers and at inter-county level with the Cork senior hurling team.

== Career ==
Born and raised in Blackpool on Cork's northside, Twomey first played hurling at juvenile and underage levels with the Glen Rovers club. He attended the North Monastery, however, his time there coincided with a fallow period in terms of Dr Harty Cup success.

Twomey progressed to adult level with Glen Rovers and lined out during a successful period for the club. He won six Cork SHC medals between 1950 and 1960, when Twomey captained the team to a third consecutive title. He also played Gaelic football with St Nicholas' and won a Cork SFC medal in 1954.

Having never played underage hurling at inter-county level, Twomey made his Cork senior hurling team in 1952. He won his first Munster SHC medal that year, before lining out as midfield partner to Gerald Murphy in the 2–14 to 0–07 win over Dublin in the 1952 All-Ireland SHC final. Twomey added a National Hurling League medal to his collection in 1953.

Twomey also won a second consecutive Munster SHC medal in 1953. He again partnered Murphy at midfield for Cork's defeat of Galway in the 1953 All-Ireland SHC medal and collected a second consecutive winners' medal. Twomey returned to the team in 1955 and captained Cork in 1960, in what was his last year with the team.

== Death ==
Twomey died on 7 April 2005, at the age of 73.

== Honours ==
St Nicholas'

- Cork Senior Football Championship (1): 1954

Glen Rovers

- Cork Senior Hurling Championship (6): 1950, 1953, 1954, 1958, 1959, 1960 (c)

Cork

- All-Ireland Senior Hurling Championship (2): 1952, 1953
- Munster Senior Hurling Championship (2): 1952, 1953
- National Hurling League (1): 1952-53

Sporting positions
| Preceded by Jimmy Brohan | Cork senior hurling team captain 1960 | Succeeded by Christy Ring |
