= 1955 Cork Senior Hurling Championship =

Annual hurling competition season

- Dates: 27 March 1955 – 16 October 1955
- Teams: 18
- Champions: St. Finbarr's (15th title); Tony O'Shaughnessy (captain)
- Runners-up: Glen Rovers; Jimmy Lynam (captain)

Tournament statistics
- Matches played: 19
- Goals scored: 147 (7.74 per match)
- Points scored: 253 (13.32 per match)

The 1955 Cork Senior Hurling Championship was the 67th staging of the Cork Senior Hurling Championship since its establishment by the Cork County Board in 1887. The championship began on 27 March 1955 and ended on 16 October 1955.

Glen Rovers entered the championship as the defending champions.

On 16 October 1955, St. Finbarr's won the championship following a 7–8 to 2–6 defeat of Glen Rovers in a replay of the final. This was their 15th championship title overall and their first title in eight championship seasons.

== Results ==
=== First round ===
10 April 1955 First round	Nemo Rangers	2-00 - 5-09	Sarsfields	Cork Athletic Grounds, Cork
	Coffey 2-0.		J Hayes 2-0, R Lotty 1-3, J Coleman 1-0, P Barry 0-3, D Shine 1-0, M Barry 0-1, Hurley 0-1, N Murphy 0-1.

15 May 1955 First round	Blackrock	2-05 - 4-06	St. Finbarr's	Cork Athletic Grounds, Cork

=== Second round ===
27 March 1955 Second round	Seandún	6-09 - 4-02	Imokilly	Riverstown Sportsfield, Sallybrook

3 April 1955 Second round	Carbery	5-03 - 4-10	Newtownshandrum	Cork Athletic Grounds, Cork

17 April 1955 Second round	Avondhu	4-09 - 2-04	Bandon	Cork Athletic Grounds, Cork

24 April 1955 Second round	Glen Rovers	4-13 - 3-06	University College Cork	Cork Athletic Grounds, Cork
	C Ring 2-7, J Clifford 2-1, E Goulding 0-2, J Rodgers 0-1, V Twomey 0-1, J Twomey 0-1.		S Long 2-0, C Hurley 0-3, V Walsh 0-1, W McCarthy 0-1, T O'Donoghue 0-1.

1 May 1955 Second round	Carrigdhoun	12-10 - 2-03	Shanballymore	Cork Athletic Grounds, Cork

8 May 1955 Second round	Midleton	3-08 - 3-03	Duhallow	Bishop Casey Memorial Park, Mallow

29 May 1955 Second round	Muskerry	3-06 - 3-05	Carrigtwohill	Cork Athletic Grounds, Cork

17 July 1955 Second round	Sarsfields	5-06 - 5-06	St. Finbarr's	Cork Athletic Grounds, Cork
	P Barry 2-0, D Shine 1-1, J Hayes 1-1, J Coleman 1-0, R Lotty 0-3, D Hurley 0-1.		M Finn 1-1, J O'Sullivan 1-1, L McGrath 1-0, T Cronin 1-0, J Russell 1-0, J Ring 0-2, W Walsh 0-1, S Ó Ceallacháin 0-1.

21 August 1955 Second round replay	Sarsfields	4-07 - 4-11 (aet)	St. Finbarr's	Cork Athletic Grounds, Cork

=== Quarter-finals ===
3 July 1955 Quarter-final	Glen Rovers	7-11 - 3-05	Carrigdhoun	Cork Athletic Grounds, Cork
	C Ring 4-3, M Quane 1-2, J Lynam 1-1, M Cullinane 0-2, J Clifford 0-2, J Hartnett 0-1,		S Kelly 2-1, D Barry 0-2, J West 0-1, S Nyhan 0-1.

3 July 1955 Quarter-final	Avondhu	8-07 - 1-05	Seandún	Bishop Casey Memorial Park, Mallow

14 August 1955 Quarter-final	Newtownshandrum	6-12 - 4-03	Midleton	Cork Athletic Grounds, Cork

4 September 1955 Quarter-final	Muskerry	1-03 - 4-10	St. Finbarr's	Coachford Sportsfield, Coachford

=== Semi-finals ===
4 September 1955 Semi-final	Glen Rovers	4-12 - 1-03	Newtownshandrum	Buttevant Sportsfield, Buttevant
			J Browne 1-0, P Tynan 0-1, Troy 0-1, J Hartnett 0-1.

25 September 1955 Semi-final	St. Finbarr's	4-05 - 3-07	Avondhu	Cork Athletic Grounds, Cork

=== Finals ===
9 October 1955 Final	St. Finbarr's	2-06 - 1-09	Glen Rovers	Cork Athletic Grounds, Cork
	M Finn 0-4, T Cronin 1-0, M Ryan 1-0, T Maher 0-2.		C Ring 1-4, J Hartnett 0-1, É Goulding 0-1, J Twomey 0-1, J Lynam 0-1, M Quane 0-1.	Referee: C Conway (Blarney)

16 October 1955 Final replay	St. Finbarr's	7-08 - 2-06	Glen Rovers	Cork Athletic Grounds, Cork
	T Maher 3-0, W McGrath 2-1, T Cronin 1-1, M Finn 0-4, J Ring 1-0, W Walsh 0-1, J O'Sullivan 0-1.		C Ring 2-03, J Lynam 0-1, J Rodgers 0-1, É Goudling 0-1.	Attendance: 35,000; Referee: C Conway (Blarney)

== Championship statistics ==
=== Miscellaneous ===
- St. Finbarr's win the title for the first time since 1947.
- In the first round replay there was confusion when the Sarsfields team lined out in an all blue strip which was almost identical to the St. Finbarr's strip. St. Finbarr's lined out in green jerseys but objected to playing against what they termed "their own colours". They eventually elected to do so but only "under protest".
