= 1965 Cork Senior Hurling Championship =

Annual hurling competition season

- Dates: 11 April – 31 October 1965
- Teams: 17
- Champions: St. Finbarr's (20th title); Tim O'Mullane (captain)
- Runners-up: University College Cork; John O'Halloran (captain)

Tournament statistics
- Matches played: 17
- Goals scored: 105 (6.18 per match)
- Points scored: 276 (16.24 per match)
- Top scorer(s): Charlie McCarthy (4-14)

The 1965 Cork Senior Hurling Championship was the 77th staging of the Cork Senior Hurling Championship since its establishment by the Cork County Board in 1887. The draw for the opening round fixtures took place at the County Convention on 31 January 1965. The championship began on 11 April 1965 and ended on 31 October 1965.

Glen Rovers were the defending champions, however, they were defeated by St. Finbarr's in the second round.

On 31 October 1965, St. Finbarr's won the championship following a 6–8 to 2–6 defeat of University College Cork in the final. This was their 16th championship title overall and their first in ten championship seasons.

Charlie McCarthy from the St. Finbarr's club was the championship's top scorer with 4–14.

== Team changes ==
=== To Championship ===
Promoted from the Cork Intermediate Hurling Championship

- Castletownroche

== Results ==
First round

11 April 1965 First round	Avondhu	1-08 - 3-12	Passage	Riverstown
	J O'Connell 1-1, P Behan 0-3, L Sheehan 0-2, P McCana 0-1, C Morrissey 0-1.		J McCarthy 0-6, T King 1-1, J Coughlan 1-1, J Barry 1-1, E O'Brien 0-2, J O'Reilly 0-1.	Referee: J Lotty (Sarsfields)

Second round

25 April 1965 Second round	Cobh	5-07 - 7-12	University College Cork	Páirc Uí Chonaill, Cobh
	S Butler 1-1, D O'Connell 1-1, S Burke 1-0, E Meaney 1-0, P Butler 1-0, J Ryan 0-3, L Butler 0-1, L McGrath 0-1.		D Harnedy 2-6, G McCarthy 2-0, M Fitzgerald 2-0, J Long 1-2, A Dooley 0-4.	Referee: M Horgan

9 May 1965 Second round	Duhallow	5-08 - 4-04	Carbery	Macroom
	T Fitzgerald 3-0, S Stokes 1-1, J Murphy 1-0, R Tarrant 0-3, D O'Sullivan 0-2, M O'Loughlin 0-1, M Roche 0-1.		J Regan 2-0, N Desmond 1-2, F O'Brien 1-0, L Hurley 0-1, C Tobin 0-1.	Referee: S Baker (Ballincollig)

9 May 1965 Second round	Sarsfields	4-06 - 4-06	Seandún	Cork Athletic Grounds, Cork
	P Barry 4-3, R O'Rahilly 0-1, J Whyte 0-1, N Long 0-1.		JJ Kearney 1-3, E Dorney 1-0, P O'Connor 1-0, D McDonnell 1-0, E Maguire 0-1, O Corcoran 0-1, D Downey 0-1.	Referee: C Conway

23 May 1965 Second round	Castletownroche	2-03 - 5-10	Carrigdhoun	Cork Athletic Grounds, Cork
	R Browne 1-1, B Walsh 1-0, H Noonan 0-1, J Browne 0-1.		JK Coleman 1-5, R Sisk 1-2, S Nyhan 1-0, D Lordan 1-0, D McCarthy 1-0, C Cooney 0-2, J Holland 0-1.	Referee: P Cronin (St. Finbarr's)

30 May 1965 Second round	Na Piarsaigh	3-12 - 1-08	Muskerry	Ballincollig
	S Gillen 2-3, M Ellard 0-7, D O'Leary 1-0, J Buckley 0-1, P Allen 0-1.		C Sheehan 0-4, J Kelly 1-0, T O'Mahony 0-2, T Kelly 0-1, M Murphy 0-1.	Referee: P Cronin (St. Finbarr's)

13 June 1965 Second round	St. Finbarr's	3-09 - 1-06	Glen Rovers	Cork Athletic Grounds, Cork
	C McCarthy 1-3, Jerry McCarthy 1-1, C Cullinane 1-0, W Doyle 0-2, Gerald McCarthy 0-2, T Connolly 0-1.		A O'Flynn 1-0, J Daly 0-2, J Salmon 0-2, D Moore 0-1, P Harte 0-1.	Referee: M Walsh (Mayfield)

15 August 1965 Second round replay	Sarsfields	1-05 - 4-08	Seandún	Cork Athletic Grounds, Cork
	D Hurley 1-1, P Barry 0-2, R Rahilly 0-2.		E Dorney 2-2, DP Foley 1-1, P Finn 1-0, P Sullivan 0-2, JJ Kearney 0-2, P Curley 0-1.	Referee: C Conway

22 August 1965 Second round	St. Vincent's	1-06 - 3-08	Imokilly	Riverstown
	N Barry 1-2, C O'Shea 0-4.		D O'Keeffe 1-1, M Holland 1-0, L Dowling 1-0, S Daly 0-2, N Gallagher 0-2, P Fitzgerald 0-1, T Browne 0-1, O O'Keeffe 0-1.	Referee: M McGovern (Nemo Rangers)

22 August 1965 Second round	Blackrock	5-14 - 4-07	Passage	Cork Athletic Grounds, Cork
	L Galligan 2-1, R Lehane 2-0, J Bennett 0-6, C McGrath 1-1, J Redmond 0-4, M Waters 0-1, F O'Mahony 0-1.		J McCarthy 2-2, E O'Brien 1-3, T King 1-0, J Coughlan 0-1, J Barry 0-1.	Referee: R Lotty (Sarsfields)

Quarter-finals

15 August 1965 Quarter-final	St. Finbarr's	2-13 - 1-04	Duhallow
	C McCarthy 1-3, Jerry McCarthy 1-0, C Roche 0-4, W Walsh 0-2, T Connolly 0-1, C Cullinane 0-1, P Finn 0-1, Gerald McCarthy 0-1.		R Tarrant 1-3, M Noonan 0-1.	Referee: M Walsh (Mayfield)

22 August 1965 Quarter-final	Na Piarsaigh	4-10 - 1-07	Carrigdhoun	Manning Park, Passage
	R Tuohy 1-2, P Allen 1-1, M Ellard 0-4, P Sheehan 1-0, M Scannell 1-0, D Sheehan 0-1, N Greaney 0-1, J Buckley 0-1.		JK Coleman 1-3, S Nyhan 0-2, C Cooney 0-1, S Sisk 0-1.	Referee: P Cronin (St. Finbarr's)

5 September 1965 Quarter-final	University College Cork	3-10 - 1-06	Seandún	The Mardyke, Cork
	S Barry 1-4, J Blake 1-4, D Harnedy 1-2.		D McDonnell 1-0, E Dorney 0-3, J Buckley 0-2, P Curley 0-1.	Referee: B Lotty (Sarsfields)

3 October 1965 Quarter-final	Blackrock	5-13 - 1-04	Imokilly	Cork Athletic Grounds, Cork
	R Lehane 1-5, W Galligan 1-5, J Bennett 1-2, F O'Mahony 1-1, J Redmond 1-0.		M Holland 1-1, S Daly 0-2, P Fitzgerald 0-1.	Referee: M Walsh (Mayfield)

Semi-finals

10 October 1965 Semi-final	St. Finbarr's	4-13 - 5-05	Na Piarsaigh	Cork Athletic Grounds, Cork
	W Doyle 2-0, M Archer 1-3, C Cullinane 1-2, C McCarthy 0-3, G McCarthy 0-3, M Walsh 0-1, C Roche 0-1.		P Sheehan 2-1, S Gillen 1-3, M Ellard 1-0, P Allen 1-0.	Attendance: 6,650; Referee: M Walsh (Mayfield)

17 October 1965 Semi-final	University College Cork	3-08 - 1-11	Blackrock	Cork Athletic Grounds, Cork
	S Barry 1-4, J Blake 1-2, J O'Halloran 1-0, D Harnedy 0-1, W Cronin 0-1.		J Redmond 1-2, J Bennett 0-3, W Galligan 0-3, F O'Mahony 0-2, J Hayes 0-1.	Attendance: 12,397; Referee: M Walsh (Mayfield)

Final

31 October 1965 Final	St. Finbarr's	6-08 - 2-05	University College Cork	Cork Athletic Grounds, Cork
	C McCarthy 2-5, C Roche 1-2, T Connolly 1-0, Gerald McCarthy 1-0, Jerry McCarthy 1-0, D Cullinane 0-1.		S Barry 1-3, J O'Halloran 1-0, D Harnedy 0-1, J Long 0-1.	Referee: M Walsh (Mayfield)

== Championship statistics ==
=== Top scorers ===
Top scorer overall

Rank	Player	Club	Tally	Total	Matches	Average
1	Charlie McCarthy	St. Finbarr's	4-14	26	4	6.50
2	Seánie Barry	UCC	3-11	20	3	6.66
3	Dan Harnedy	UCC	3-10	19	4	4.75
4	Billy Galligan	Blackrock	3-09	18	3	6.00
5	Paddy Barry	Sarsfields	4-05	17	2	8.50
6	Séamus Gillen	Na Piarsaigh	3-06	15	3	5.00
7	Dick Lehane	Blackrock	3-05	14	3	4.66
7	Eddie Dorney	Seandún	3-05	14	3	4.66
7	Justin McCarthy	Passage	2-08	14	2	7.00
7	John Kevin Coleman	Carrigdhoun	2-08	14	2	7.00
7	John Bennett	Blackrock	1-11	14	3	4.66
7	Mick Ellard	Na Piarsaigh	1-11	14	3	4.66

Top scorers in a single game

Rank	Player	Club	Tally	Total	Opposition
1	Paddy Barry	Sarsfields	4-03	15	Seandún
2	Dan Harnedy	UCC	2-06	12	Cobh
3	Charlie McCarthy	St. Finbarr's	2-05	11	UCC
4	Ted Fitzgerald	Duhallow	3-00	9	Carbery
4	Séamus Gillen	Na Piarsaigh	2-03	9	Muskerry
6	Justin McCarthy	Passage	2-02	8	Blackrock
6	Eddie Dorney	Seandún	2-02	8	Sarsfields
6	John Kevin Coleman	Carrigdhoun	1-05	8	Castletownroche
6	Dick Lehane	Blackrock	1-05	8	Imokilly
6	Billy Galligan	Blackrock	1-05	8	Imokilly

=== Miscellaneous ===
- St. Finbarr's win the title for the first time since 1955.
