= 1947 Cork Senior Hurling Championship =

Annual hurling competition season

- Dates: 6 April 1947 – 19 October 1947
- Teams: 13
- Champions: St. Finbarr's (14th title); Seán Condon (captain)
- Runners-up: Sarsfields

Tournament statistics
- Matches played: 12
- Goals scored: 93 (7.75 per match)
- Points scored: 114 (9.5 per match)
- Top scorer(s): Micka Brennan (8-02)

The 1947 Cork Senior Hurling Championship was the 59th staging of the Cork Senior Hurling Championship since its establishment by the Cork County Board in 1887. The draw for the opening round fixtures was made at the Cork Convention on 26 January 1947. The championship began on 6 April 1947 and ended on 19 October 1947.

St. Finbarr's entered the championship as the defending champions.

On 19 October 1947, St. Finbarr's won the championship following a 4–6 to 4–4 defeat of Sarsfields in the final. This was their 14th championship title overall and their second title in succession.

== Team changes ==
=== To Championship ===
Promoted to the Cork Senior Hurling Championship

- Carrigtwohill (drawn to play Imokilly in the first round but withdrew before the championship started and replaced by University College Cork)

=== From Championship ===
Withdrew from the Cork Senior Hurling Championship

- Army

== Results ==
First round

6 April 1947 First round	Carrigdhoun	6-06 - 1-02	Nemo Rangers	Douglas
	T Fahy 2-0, C Harrington 1-1, T O'Callaghan 1-1, M O'Connell 1-0, D Finn 1-0, D Dunne 0-1, F Ahern 0-1, M Nestor 0-1, R Andrews 0-1.		B Murphy 1-1, J Christie 0-1.

4 May 1947 First round	Muskerry	0-03 - 6-06	St. Finbarr's	Coachford Sportsfield, Coachford
	J Grady 0-2, D Moynihan 0-1.		A Beckett 2-0, W Beckett 2-0, D McCarthy 1-1, T Coughlan 1-0, H Gouldsborough 0-2, J Kenny 0-2, S Condon 0-1.

11 May 1947 First round	University College Cork	3-02 - 7-05	Imokilly	Clonmult Memorial Park, Midleton
	J Harris 1-1, B Murphy 1-1, J McCarthy 1-0.		WJ Daly 2-3, T O'Sullivan 2-0, M Fouhy 1-1, E Cleary 1-1, J Edwards 1-0.

18 May 1947 First round	Glen Rovers	5-10 - 3-05	Ballincollig	The Mardyke, Cork
	C Ring 0-7, D O'Sullivan 1-1, D O'Donovan 1-0, D Twomey 1-0, J Hartnett 1-0, J Lynch 1-0, S O'Brien 0-1.		D McCarthy 1-1, P Healy 1-0, W Murphy 1-0, M O'Connor 0-1, V Lynch 0-1, S Dobbin 0-1.

1 June 1947 First round	Blackrock	3-05 - 6-09	Avondhu	Buttevant Sportsfield, Buttevant
	W Attridge 2-3, D Maher 1-0, D Murphy 0-1, K O'Riordan 0-1.		J McCann 1-0, P Galvin 1-1, M O'Toole 0-1, L Griffin 0-1, M Cronin 0-1.

1 June 1947 First round	Sarsfields	7-06 - 3-02	Carbery	Innishannon Sportsfield, Innishannon
	M Brennan 3-1, P O'Leary 2-3, P Barry 2-0, A Lotty 0-2.		L Ahern 2-0, P O'Riordan 1-0, C O'Neill 0-1, S O'Donovan 0-1.

Second round

17 August 1947 Second round	Seandún	1-04 - 6-03	St. Finbarr's	Cork Athletic Grounds, Cork
	C Murphy 1-2, D Murphy 0-1, J O'Mahony 0-1.		D McCarthy 3-0, F O'Connor 2-0, A Beckett 1-0, W Beckett 0-1, J Goulding 0-1, S Condon 0-1.	Referee: J Buckley (Glen Rovers)

17 August 1947 Second round	Glen Rovers	3-06 - 5-04	Sarsfields	Cork Athletic Grounds, Cork
	J Lynch 1-2, D Twomey 1-1, J Kelly 1-0, C Ring 0-3.		M Dwyer 2-0, M Brennan 1-0, P Barry 1-0, J O'Neill 1-0, A Lotty 0-2, P O'Leary 0-2.

24 August 1947 Second round	Carrigdhoun	4-03 - 4-04	Avondhu	Cork Athletic Grounds, Cork
	D Dunne 2-0, J Jones 1-0, T Drinan 1-0, W Twomey 0-1, M Brennan 0-1, C Cottrell 0-1.		J Thornhill 1-0, D Murray 2-0, M Kearney 1-0, M O'Toole 0-3.	Referee: P Taylor (Nemo Rangers)

- Imokilly received a bye in this round.

Semi-finals

28 September 1947 Semi-final	Sarsfields	8-06 - 2-03	Avondhu	Cork Athletic Grounds, Cork
	P Barry 2-1, M Brennan 2-1, P O'Leary 1-2, M Dwyer 1-1, J O'Neill 1-0, J Barry 1-0, C Murphy 0-1.		T Galvin 1-0, M Kearney 1-0, M O'Toole 0-2, W Griffin 0-1.	Referee: P Taylor (Nemo Rangers)

5 October 1947 Semi-final	St. Finbarr's	2-04 - 0-06	Imokilly	Cork Athletic Grounds, Cork
	D McCarthy 1-0, J Goulding 1-0, J Sargent 0-1, J Kenny 0-1, H Gouldsborough 0-1, S Condon 0-1.		WJ Daly 0-3, JJ O'Boyle 0-1, J Edwards 0-1, P Abernethy 0-1.	Referee: C Murphy (Valley Rovers)

Final

19 October 1947 Final	St. Finbarr's	4-06 - 4-04	Sarsfields	Cork Athletic Grounds, Cork
	J Sargent 2-0, P Gallagher 0-5, J Goulding 1-0, B Beckett 1-0, S Condon 0-1, S O'Callaghan 0-1.		M Brennan 2-0, P O'Leary 1-2, A Lotty 1-0, C Murphy 0-2.	Attendance: 23,493; Referee: C Murphy (Valley Rovers)

== Championship statistics ==
=== Top scorers ===
Top scorers overall

Rank	Player	Club	Tally	Total	Matches	Average
1	Micka Brennan	Sarsfields	8-02	26	4	6.50
2	Pat O'Leary	Sarsfields	4-09	21	4	5.25

Top scorers in a single game

Rank	Player	Club	Tally	Total	Opposition
1	Micka Brennan	Sarsfields	3-01	10	Carbery
2	Willie John Daly	Imokilly	2-03	9	UCC
2	Willie Attridge	Blackrock	2-03	9	Avondhu
2	Pat O'Leary	Sarsfields	2-03	9	Carbery
3	Paddy Barry	Sarsfields	2-01	7	Avondhu
3	Micka Brennan	Sarsfields	2-01	7	Avondhu
3	Christy Ring	Glen Rovers	0-07	7	Ballincollig

=== Miscellaneous ===
- On 17 August 1947, Sarsfields recorded their first ever championship victory over Glen Rovers.
