= Paddy Barry (Sarsfields hurler) =

Irish hurler

Personal information
- Native name: Pádraig de Barra (Irish)
- Born: 1928 Glounthaune, County Cork, Ireland
- Died: 18 December 2000 (aged 72) Fermoy, County Cork, Ireland
- Occupation: Bakery owner
- Height: 5 ft 10 in (178 cm)

Sport
- Sport: Hurling
- Position: Left corner-forward
Club
- Years: Club
- 1946–1968: Sarsfields
Club titles
- Cork titles: 2
Inter-county*
Years	County	Apps (scores)
1949–1964	Cork	28 (15–18)
Inter-county titles
- Munster titles: 4
- All-Irelands: 3
- NHL: 2
- *Inter County team apps and scores correct as of 14:05, 19 April 2015.

Patrick "Paddy" Barry (1928 – 18 December 2000) was an Irish hurler who played as a left corner-forward for the Cork senior team.

Born in Glounthaune, County Cork, Barry first arrived on the inter-county scene at the age of seventeen when he first linked up with the Cork minor team. He made his senior debut during the 1947–48 league. Barry subsequently became a regular member of the starting fifteen and won three All-Ireland medals, four Munster medals and two National Hurling League medals. The All-Ireland-winning captain of 1952, he was an All-Ireland runner-up on one occasion.

As a member of the Munster inter-provincial team on a number of occasions, Barry won four Railway Cup medal. At club level he was a two-time championship medallist with Sarsfields, while he also played Gaelic football with sister club Glanmire.

Throughout his career Barry made 28 championship appearances. His retirement came following the conclusion of the 1961 championship, however, he was recalled to the team for two more seasons before retiring again after the 1964 championship.

Barry is widely regarded as one of the greatest hurlers of all time. He has been repeatedly voted onto teams made up of the sport's greats, including at left corner-forward on the Cork Hurling Team of the Century and the Munster Hurling Team of the Millennium. McCarthy was also chosen as one of the 125 greatest hurlers of all-time in a 2009 poll.

== Playing career ==
=== University ===
During his studies at University College Cork, Barry was included on the college hurling team. In 1947 he was an unused substitute as University College Cork hosted the inter-varsities championship. Cork won all of their games and topped the league with six points, with Barry winning a Fitzgibbon Cup medal as a substitute.

=== Club ===
As a dual player at club level, Barry had a very successful year in 1951. A 3–2 to 1–5 defeat of Delaney Rovers in a replay of the junior football decider secured a championship medal for Barry.

That year the Sarsfields senior hurlers reached the final of the championship where they faced reigning champions and four-in-a-row hopefuls Glen Rovers. A 5–8 to 3–7 victory gave Sarsfields their first county triumph, while Barry also collected his first championship medal.

In 1957 Barry collected a second championship medal as Sarsfields defeated University College Cork by 5–10 to 4–6 to take their second ever county title.

Barry won a second junior football championship medal in 1958 as Mitchelstown were narrowly defeated by 2–7 to 2–5.

=== Inter-county ===
==== Beginnings ====
Barry first played for Cork as a member of the minor hurling team on 9 June 1946. He scored a goal on his debut in a 6–3 to 2–2 Munster quarter-final defeat of Clare.

On 30 November 1947 Barry made his senior debut for Cork in a 7–5 to 5–5 league group game defeat by Wexford. He scored 3–1 on that occasion and became a regular player throughout the subsequent stages of the league. He was at left corner-forward for the subsequent final against Tipperary, and collected his first National Hurling League medal after Cork's 3-3 to 1–2 victory. On 18 July 1948 Daly made a goal-scoring senior championship debut in a 5–3 to 2–5 Munster semi-final defeat of Limerick.

Barry was an unused substitute for Cork during their unsuccessful championship campaign in 1948, before making his championship debut as a substitute on 26 June 1949 in a 2–8 to 1–9 Munster quarter-finale extra time defeat by Tipperary.

==== Three-in-a-row ====
After being confined to the substitutes' bench again in 1950, Barry was dropped from the championship panel the following year. A successful club championship campaign with Sarsfield's saw Barry secure a regular place on the starting fifteen as captain in 1952. After a period of dominance by Tipperary between 1949 and 1951, Cork bounced back that year. A late Barry goal gave Cork a 1–11 to 2–6 defeat of four-in-a-row hopefuls Tipperary. It was his first Munster medal. On 7 September 1952 Cork faced Dublin in the All-Ireland decider. An appendicitis ruled Joe Hartnett out of the game, resulting in Daly being switched to centre-forward. Liam Dowling scored a vital goal in the first half to give Cork the interval lead. Dublin's attack collapsed in the second half as Dowling scored a second goal. The 2–14 to 0–7 victory gave Barry his first All-Ireland medal, while he also had the honour of lifting the Liam MacCarthy Cup.

Barry added a second league medal to his collection in 1953 as Cork defeated Tipperary by 2–10 to 2–7. In the subsequent provincial championship he won a second Munster medal as Cork once again downed their arch rivals by 3–10 to 1–11. On 6 September 1953 Cork faced Galway in what was one of the dirtiest All-Ireland deciders of all time. Galway went into the game with the intention of upsetting their opponents physically and did just that, however, the game remains clouded in controversy due to the injury to the Galway captain, Mick Burke. The result remained in doubt right up to the final whistle, however, Cork secured a 3–3 to 0–8 victory. Barry had won his second All-Ireland medal. After the match at the Gresham Hotel in Dublin a fight broke out when another Galway player struck Cork's Christy Ring. The following morning another fight broke out when another member of the Galway panel attempted to hit Ring. The fights, however, ended just as quickly as they had started.

Cork secured a third successive provincial title in 1954, with Barry collecting a third Munster medal following a narrow 2–8 to 1–8 defeat of Tipperary. A record crowd of 84,856 attended the subsequent All-Ireland decider on 5 September 1954 with Wexford providing the opposition. Wexford had a four-point lead with seventeen minutes left to play, however, history was against the Leinster champions when Johnny Clifford scored the winning goal for Cork with just four minutes left. A narrow 1–9 to 1–6 victory secured a third successive All-Ireland for Cork and for Barry.

==== Decline ====
Four-in-a-row proved beyond Cork, however, the team bounced back in 1956. A 5–5 to 3–5 defeat of Limerick, courtesy of a hat trick of goals by Christy Ring, secured a fourth Munster medal in five seasons for Barry. This victory allowed Cork to advance directly to an All-Ireland final meeting with Wexford on 23 September 1956. The game has gone down in history as one of the all-time classics as Christy Ring was bidding for a record ninth All-Ireland medal. The game turned on one important incident as the Wexford goalkeeper, Art Foley, made a miraculous save from a Ring shot and cleared the sliotar up the field to set up another attack. Nicky Rackard scored a crucial goal with two minutes to go giving Wexford a 2–14 to 2–8 victory.

Cork hurling took a sharp downturn over the next few years as Waterford and Tipperary became the dominant teams in the provincial championship. Defeat in the provincial decider in 1961 brought the curtain down on Barry's inter-county career.

Two years later in 1963 Barry was recalled to the Cork team and installed on the starting fifteen for the Munster semi-final. A 4–7 to 1–11 defeat by Tipperary was the result on that occasion.

Barry remained on the starting fifteen in 1964, however, Cork faced a 3–13 to 1–5 trouncing by Tipperary in the provincial decider.

=== Inter-provincial ===
Barry was first chosen on the Munster inter-provincial team in 1953. That year he was introduced as a substitute for Christy Ring in the decider against Leinster. A 5–7 to 5–5 victory secured his first Railway Cup medal.

After failing to make the starting fifteen over the next few years, Barry was back in the forwards for the 1957 decider. A 6–6 to 0–10 defeat of Connacht gave him a second Railway Cup medal.

Munster retained the inter-provincial crown in 1958, with Barry collecting a third Railway Cup medal following a narrow 3–7 to 3–5 defeat of Leinster.

Barry played no part on the team in 1959, however, he returned as left corner-forward in 1960. A 6–6 to 2–7 defeat of Connacht gave him a fourth and final Railway Cup medal.

== Career statistics ==
=== Club ===
Team	Year	SHC	
Team	Year	Apps	Score
Sarsfields	1956	1	1-02
Sarsfields	1957	4	7-11
Sarsfields	1958	3	2-06
Sarsfields	1959	2	5-01
Sarsfields	1960	3	4-01
Sarsfields	1961	3	6-05
Sarsfields	1962	1	0-01
Sarsfields	1963	2	1-06
Sarsfields	1964	3	3-15
Sarsfields	1965	2	4-05
Sarsfields	1966	1	0-00
Sarsfields	1967	3	3-02

== Honours ==
=== Team ===
Sarsfield's

- Cork Senior Hurling Championship (2): 1951, 1957

Glanmire

- Cork Junior Football Championship (2): 1951, 1958

University College Cork

- Fitzgibbon Cup (1): 1947 (sub)

Cork

- All-Ireland Senior Hurling Championship (3): 1952, 1953, 1954
- Munster Senior Hurling Championship (4): 1952, 1953, 1954, 1956
- National Hurling League (2): 1947–48, 1952–53

Munster

- Railway Cup (4): 1953, 1957, 1958, 1960

Sporting positions
Preceded by John Lyons	Cork Senior Hurling Captain; 1952	Succeeded by Christy Ring
Preceded by Mick Cashman	Cork Senior Hurling Captain; 1958	Succeeded by Jimmy Brohan
Achievements
Preceded by Jimmy Finn (Tipperary)	All-Ireland Senior Hurling winning captain 1952	Succeeded by Christy Ring (Cork)
