= 1965 Cork Intermediate Hurling Championship =

Irish hurling competition

- Dates: 11 April – 31 October 1965
- Teams: 15
- Champions: Glen Rovers (7th title)
- Runners-up: Éire Óg

Tournament statistics
- Matches played: 14
- Goals scored: 101 (7.21 per match)
- Points scored: 194 (13.86 per match)

The 1965 Cork Intermediate Hurling Championship was the 56th staging of the Cork Intermediate Hurling Championship since its establishment by the Cork County Board in 1909. The draw for the first-round fixtures took place on 31 January 1965. The championship ran from 11 April to 31 October 1965.

Glen Rovers won the championship following a 3–08 to 3–05 defeat of Éire Óg in the final. This was their seventh championship title overall and their first title since 1961.

== Team changes ==
=== To Championship ===
Promoted from the Cork Junior A Hurling Championship

- Castlemartyr

Regraded from the Cork City Junior A Hurling Championship

- Nemo Rangers

Regraded from the South East Junior A Hurling Championship

- Shamrocks

=== From Championship ===
Promoted to the Cork Senior Hurling Championship

- Castletownroche

Regraded to the North Cork Junior A Hurling Championship

- Rathluirc

== Results ==
=== First round ===
11 April 1965 First round	Youghal	3-05 - 4-08	Midleton	Castlemartyr Grounds

18 April 1965 First round	Nemo Rangers	1-01 - 2-06	Shamrocks	Manning Park

18 April 1965 First round	Éire Óg	5-05 - 4-00	Tracton	Ballinhassig Grounds

2 May 1965 First round	Mallow	3-03 - 1-06	Carrigaline	Cork Athletic Grounds

6 June 1965 First round	Sarsfields	1-10 - 3-06	Bandon	Carrigaline Grounds

12 June 1965 First round	Glen Rovers	6-06 - 4-07	Cloyne	Páirc Uí Chonaill

12 June 1965 First round	Castlemartyr	8-04 - 6-11	Ballymartle	Cork Athletic Grounds

- Ballincollig received a bye in this round.

=== Quarter-finals ===
12 June 1965 Quarter-final	Midleton	3-11 - 3-05	Shamrocks	Cork Athletic Grounds

8 August 1965 Quarter-final	Éire óg	6-09 - 3-04	Bandon	Riverstick Grounds
	C Sheehan 2-3, T Brady 2-0, D Bryan 1-2, M Murphy 1-1, P Bryan 0-2, H Ahern 0-1.		M McNamara 2-1, B Desmond 1-0, JJ Crowley 0-2, N Desmond 0-1.

8 August 1965 Quarter-final	Glen Rovers	1-13 - 1-05	Mallow	Páirc Mhic Gearailt

29 August 1966 Quarter-final	Ballincollig	4-13 - 4-12	Ballymartle	Ballingassig Grounds

=== Semi-finals ===
12 September 1965 Semi-final	Éire Óg	7-09 - 2-08	Midleton	Cork Athletic Grounds
	D O'Brien 3-2, M Murphy 2-3, P O'Brien 2-0, T Brady 0-3, C Sheehan 0-1.		F Walsh 1-2, J Hennessy 1-1, P Fitzgerald 0-4, G Murphy 0-1.

17 October 1965 Semi-final	Glen Rovers	5-08 - 5-06	Ballincollig	Cork Athletic Grounds
	T Corbett 1-2, S O'Riordan 1-2, R O'Connell 1-0, D O'Brien 1-0, W Carroll 0-2, S McAllen 0-2.		T Murphy 2-2, W Fitton 2-0, S Barry-Murphy 1-0, T O'Dwyer 0-2, G O'Regan 0-2.

=== Final ===
31 October 1965 Final	Glen Rovers	3-08 - 3-05	Éire Óg	Cork Athletic Grounds
	T Corbett 1-5, R O'Connell 1-0, D O'Driscoll 1-0, W Carroll 0-2, M O'Halloran 0-1.		C Sheehan 1-3, M Murphy 1-1, F Sheehan 1-0, D O'Brien 0-1.

== Championship statistics ==
=== Miscellaneous ===
- The final was an ill-tempered affair with seven players being sent off over the course of the game.
