= 1946 Cork Senior Hurling Championship =

Annual hurling competition season

- Dates: 7 April 1946 – 16 November 1946
- Teams: 13
- Champions: St. Finbarr's (13th title); P. Coughlan (captain)
- Runners-up: Glen Rovers; Christy Ring (captain)

Tournament statistics
- Matches played: 14
- Goals scored: 97 (6.93 per match)
- Points scored: 156 (11.14 per match)

The 1946 Cork Senior Hurling Championship was the 58th staging of the Cork Senior Hurling Championship since its establishment by the Cork County Board in 1887. The championship began on 7 April 1946 and ended on 16 November 1946.

Glen Rovers were the defending champions.

On 16 November 1946, St. Finbarr's won the championship following a 2–3 to 2–1 defeat of Glen Rovers in the final. This was their 13th championship title overall and their first title in three championship seasons.

== Results ==
=== First round ===
7 April 1946 First round	Muskerry	7-05 - 1-06	Army	Coachford Sportsfield, Coachford
	J Barry-Murphy 3-0, T Barry-Murphy 1-1, J Twomey 1-0, M Desmond 1-0, J O'Grady 1-0, D Moynihan 0-1, J Fitzgerald 0-1, T Burns 0-1.		T O'Neill 1-0, H Gouldsboro 0-3, Fitzsimons 0-1, E Young 0-1, P Hayes 0-1.	Referee: P Taylor

21 April 1946 First round	Blackrock	4-09 - 6-03	Imokilly	Riverstown Sportsfield, Sallybrook
	M O'Riordan 2-3, EJ O'Sullivan 1-3, P Madden 1-0, D Murphy 0-2, Horgan 0-1.		P Abernethy 2-3, WJ Daly 1-0, P Campbell 1-0, E Cleary 1-0, J O'Sullivan 1-0.	Referee: F Casey (Glen Rovers)

28 April 1946 First round	Carrigdhoun	5-03 - 7-07	Glen Rovers	Cork Athletic Grounds, Cork
	R Andrews 2-0, D Dunne 2-0, M Drinan 1-0, W Twomey 0-1, T O'Callghan 0-1, R O'Regan 0-1.		C Ring 3-1, C O'Flaherty 2-0, D Twomey 1-2, J Lynch 1-0, J Young 0-1, D Healy 0-1, S O'Brien 0-1.	Referee: C Murphy (Ballincollig)

28 April 1946 First round	Avondhu	1-09 - 3-03	Sarsfields	Buttevant Sporstfield, Buttevant
	J Lyons 1-4, M Twohill 0-1, T Higgins 0-1, W Griffin 0-1, R Walsh 0-1.		M Dwyer 3-0, P O'Leary 0-2, T Hayes 0-1.	Referee: D Maher (Blackrock)

12 May 1946 First round	Nemo Rangers	1-01 - 4-09	St. Finbarr's	Cork Athletic Grounds, Cork
	B Murphy 1-0.		S Condon 1-4, MJ O'Driscoll 1-0, F O'Donovan 1-0, J Goulding 0-1, T O'Halloran 0-1, T Coughlan 0-1, D McCarthy 0-1, S Kennefick 0-1.

12 May 1946 First round	Ballincollig	1-09 - 3-06	Carbery	Innishannon Sportsfield, Innishannon
	W Murphy 0-7, D O'Sullivan 0-1, M O'Connor 0-1.		D Cullinane 1-1, C O'Neill 1-1, W McGrath 1-1, Conroy 0-1, Nolan 0-1, H O'Neill 0-1.

4 August 1946 First round replay	Avondhu	1-07 - 1-09	Sarsfields	The Mardyke, Cork
	O'Toole 1-5, W Griffin 0-1, J Ryan 0-1.		M Brennan 1-2, P O'Leary 0-3, A Lotty 0-2, J O'Neill 0-1, M Dwyer 0-1.	Referee: D Maher (Blackrock)

11 August 1946 First round replay	Blackrock	2-05 - 8-04	Imokilly	Cork Athletic Grounds, Cork
	M O'Riordan 1-0, T Horgan 1-0, K O'Riordan 0-3, EJ O'Sullivan 0-1, D Murphy 0-1.		P Campbell 3-0, C Murphy 2-1, E Cleary 2-1, P Abernethy 1-0, J O'Sullivan 0-1, WJ Daly 0-1.	Referee: J Buckley (Glen Rovers)

- Glen Rovers received a bye in this round.

=== Second round ===
18 August 1946 Second round	Seandún	2-02 - 6-08	Sarsfields	Cork Athletic Grounds, Cork

15 September 1946 Second round	Muskerry	1-05 - 4-05	Imokilly	The Mardyke, Cork

15 September 1946 Second round	St. Finbarr's	5-10 - 3-09	Carbery	Innishannon Sportsfield, Innishannon

=== Semi-finals ===
22 September 1946 Semi-final	Glen Rovers	8-04 - 1-07	Sarsfields	Cork Athletic Grounds, Cork

29 September 1946 Semi-final	St. Finbarr's	4-04 - 4-03	Imokilly	Cork Athletic Grounds, Cork

=== Final ===
16 November 1946 Final	St. Finbarr's	2-03 - 2-01	Glen Rovers	Cork Athletic Grounds, Cork
	S Condon 1-1, Gallagher 1-0, Goulding 0-1, Keating 0-1.		J Lynch 1-1, D Twomey 1-0.

== Championship statistics ==
=== Miscellaneous ===
- The tricolour was flown at half mast and a two-minute silence was held at all games on 12 May in honour of IRA hunger striker Seán McCaughey who died in Portlaoise Prison the previous day.
