= 1950 Cork Junior Hurling Championship =

Irish hurling competition

- Dates: 24 September - 3 December 1950
- Teams: 7
- Champions: Glen Rovers (2nd title)
- Runners-up: Ballyhea

The 1950 Cork Junior Hurling Championship was the 53rd staging of the Cork Junior Hurling Championship since its establishment by the Cork County Board.

On 3 December 1950, Glen Rovers won the championship following a 4–06 to 3–00 defeat of Ballyhea in the final at the Bishop Casey Memorial Park in Mallow. This was their second championship title overall and a first title in 26 years.

== Results ==
=== Final ===
3 December 1950 Final	Glen Rovers	4-06 - 3-00	Ballyhea	Bishop Casey Memorial Park
