= 1924 Cork Junior Hurling Championship =

Irish hurling competition

- Champions: Glen Rovers (1st title); T. Dwyer (captain)
- Runners-up: Dunmanway; D. Crowley (captain)

The 1924 Cork Junior Hurling Championship was the 27th staging of the Cork Junior Hurling Championship since its establishment by the Cork County Board in 1895.

Glen Rovers won the championship title for the first time in their history.

== Results ==
=== Semi-final ===
14 December 1924 Semi-final	Dunmanway	4-00 - 3-02	Ballincollig	The Mardyke

14 December 1924 Semi-final	Glen Rovers	5-05 - 0-00	Youghal	Rverstown Sportsfield

=== Final ===
Final	Glen Rovers	v	Dunmanway
