= 1961 Cork Intermediate Hurling Championship =

Irish hurling competition

- Dates: 9 April – 8 October 1961
- Teams: 11
- Champions: Glen Rovers (6th title)
- Runners-up: Castletownroche

Tournament statistics
- Matches played: 11
- Goals scored: 82 (7.45 per match)
- Points scored: 130 (11.82 per match)

The 1961 Cork Intermediate Hurling Championship was the 52nd staging of the Cork Intermediate Hurling Championship since its establishment by the Cork County Board in 1909. The draw for the opening round fixtures took place on 29 January 1961. The championship ran from 9 April to 8 October 1961.

The final, a replay, was played on 8 October 1961 at Riverstown Sportsfield, between Glen Rovers and Castletownroche, in what was their first ever meeting in the final. Glen Rovers won the match by 4–06 to 1–06 to claim their sixth championship title overall and a first title in three years.

== Results ==
=== First round ===
| 9 April 1961 First round | Tracton | 5-01 - 6-08 | Carrigaline | Riverstick Grounds |

| 7 May 1961 First round | St Finbarr's | 2-03 - 7-08 | Castletownroche | Bishop Casey Memorial Park |

| 21 May 1961 First round | Cobh | 1-09 - 3-04 | Bandon | Cork Athletic Grounds |

=== Quarter-finals ===
| 7 May 1961 Quarter-final | Glen Rovers | 4-08 - 3-02 | Rathluirc | Bishop Casey Memorial Park |

| 7 May 1961 Quarter-final | Fermoy | 8-03 - 2-08 | Ballymartle | Cork Athletic Grounds |

| 28 May 1961 Quarter-final | Castletownroche | 6-05 - 5-06 | Midleton | Páirc Mhic Gearailt |

| 18 June 1961 Quarter-final | Carrigaline | 5-08 - 4-08 | Bandon | Ballinhassig Grounds |

=== Semi-finals ===
| 27 June 1961 Semi-final | Glen Rovers | 3-09 - 1-07 | Fermoy | Cork Athletic Grounds |

| 6 August 1961 Semi-final | Castletownroche | 6-07 - 4-02 | Bandon | Cork Athletic Grounds |

=== Final ===
| 10 September 1961 Final | Glen Rovers | 2-03 - 0-09 | Castletownroche | Riverstown Sportsfield |

=== Final replay ===
| 8 October 1961 Final replay | Glen Rovers | 4-06 - 1-06 | Castletownroche | Riverstown Sportsfield |
