= 1934 Cork Senior Hurling Championship =

Annual hurling competition season

- Dates: 25 March 1934 – 7 October 1934
- Teams: 17
- Champions: Glen Rovers (1st title); Josa Lee (captain)
- Runners-up: St. Finbarr's

Tournament statistics
- Matches played: 14
- Goals scored: 67 (4.79 per match)
- Points scored: 103 (7.36 per match)

The 1934 Cork Senior Hurling Championship was the 46th staging of the Cork Senior Hurling Championship since its establishment by the Cork County Board in 1887. The draw for the opening round fixtures took place at the Cork Convention on 28 January 1934. The championship began on 25 March 1934 and ended on 7 October 1934.

St. Finbarr's were the defending champions. Divisional side Seandún fielded a team in the championship for the first time.

On 7 October 1934, Glen Rovers won the championship following a 3–2 to 0–6 defeat of St. Finbarr's in the final. This was their first championship title ever and the first of eight successive championship titles.

== Results ==
=== First round ===
25 March 1934 First round	Avondhu	2-00 - 3-02	Carrigtwohill	St. Patrick's Athletic Grounds, Fermoy

25 March 1934 First round	Éire Óg	2-04 - 1-04	Carbery	Bandon Sportsfield, Bandon

8 April 1934 First round	Muskerry	2-01 - 1-02	Nemo Rangers	The Mardyke, Cork

15 April 1933 First round	Midleton	0-03 - 5-03	St. Finbarr's	Riverstown Sportsfield, Glanmire

22 April 1934 First round	Glen Rovers	5-06 - 3-00	Mallow	The Mardyke, Cork

29 April 1934 First round	Sarsfields	4-06 - 8-05	Blackrock	Cork Athletic Grounds, Cork

6 May 1934 First round	Redmonds	0-03 - 2-08	Seandún	The Mardyke, Cork

First round	Carrigdhoun	w/o - scr.	University College Cork

=== Second round ===
17 June 1934 Second round	St. Colman's	3-03 - 4-04	Éire Óg	Cork Athletic Grounds, Cork

1 July 1934 Second round	Carrigtwohill	3-06 - 3-05	Muskerry	The Mardyke, Cork

5 August 1934 Second round	St. Finbarr's	2-04 - 0-01	Carrigdhoun	Douglas Sportsfield, Douglas

26 August 1934 Second round	Glen Rovers	3-06 - 0-01	Blackrock	The Mardyke, Cork

=== Semi-finals ===
9 September 1934 Semi-final	Glen Rovers	2-06 - 1-03	Seandún	Cork Athletic Grounds, Cork

16 September 1934 Semi-final	St. Finbarr's	3-05 - 2-04	Carrigtwohill	Cork Athletic Grounds, Cork

=== Final ===
7 October 1934 Final	Glen Rovers	3-02 - 0-06	St. Finbarr's	Cork Athletic Grounds, Cork
	P Murphy 2-0, B Barrett 1-0, P Dowling 0-1, J Lee 0-1.		DB Murphy 0-3, DP Murphy 0-2, W Stanton, 0-1.	Attendance: 18,516; Referee: T Daly (Clare)

== Statistics ==
=== Miscellaneous ===
- Seandún fielded a team in the championship for the first time.
- Seandún became the first divisional team to reach the semi-final stage of the championship.
- An attendance of 18,516 was officially returned for the final, however, thousands more are believed to have entered the grounds through various unauthorised entrances and it was estimated that almost 25,000 people were present. It was a new attendance record for a final.
- Glen Rovers and St Finbarr's face each-other in the final for the first time.
- Glen Rovers win their first senior title
