= 1950 Cork Senior Hurling Championship =

Annual hurling competition season

- Dates: 23 April 1950 – 17 September 1950
- Teams: 13
- Champions: Glen Rovers (13th title); John Lyons (captain)
- Runners-up: St. Finbarr's; Tom Mulcahy (captain)

Tournament statistics
- Matches played: 12
- Goals scored: 91 (7.58 per match)
- Points scored: 117 (9.75 per match)

The 1950 Cork Senior Hurling Championship was the 62nd staging of the Cork Senior Hurling Championship since its establishment by the Cork County Board in 1887. The draw for the opening round fixtures took place at the Cork Convention on 29 January 1950. The championship began on 23 April 1950 and ended on 17 September 1950.

Glen Rovers were the defending champions.

On 17 September 1950, Glen Rovers won the championship following a 2–8 to 0–5 defeat of St. Finbarr's in the final. This was their 13th championship title overall and their third title in succession.

== Team changes ==
=== To Championship ===
Fielded teams after an absence

- Duhallow
- Seandún

== Results ==
=== First round ===
23 April 1950 First round	Avondhu	3-02 - 5-03	Imokilly	Fitzgerald Park, Fermoy

30 April 1950 First round	Carrigdhoun	4-06 - 1-03	Duhallow	Cork Athletic Grounds, Cork

7 May 1950 First round	Carbery	6-02 - 3-10	University College Cork	Charlie Hurley Park, Bandon

14 May 1950 First round	St. Finbarr's	6-02 - 5-03	Muskerry	Ballincollig Sportsfield, Ballincollig

21 May 1950 First round	Rathluirc	6-02 - 3-00	Seandún	Bishop Casey Memorial Park, Mallow

4 June 1950 First round	Blackrock	7-04 - 3-05	Sarsfields	Cork Athletic Grounds, Cork

- Glen Rovers received a bye in this round.

=== Second round ===
9 July 1950 Second round	Glen Rovers	6-05 - 4-08	Imokilly	Cork Athletic Grounds, Cork

20 August 1950 Second round	Carrigdhoun	2-05 - 7-08	St. Finbarr's	Cork Athletic Grounds, Cork

20 August 1950 Second round	Blackrock	1-05 - 5-06	Rathluirc	Buttevant Sportsfield, Buttevant
	D Hayes 1-0, D Murphy 0-2, P Hayes 0-2.		D O'Toole 2-2, M O'Toole 1-3, D Flynn 1-1.

- Carbery received a bye in this round.

=== Semi-finals ===
3 September 1950 Semi-final	Glen Rovers	3-09 - 4-03	Carbery	Kinsale Sportsfield, Kinsale
	D Twomey 2-1, J Hartnett 1-1, J Lynch 0-3, C Ring 0-2, D Terry 0-1, D O'Sullivan 0-1.		J Burrows 2-1, P O'Riordan 1-1, J O'Driscoll 1-0, M O'Mahony 0-1.	Referee: M Barrett (Nemo Rangers)

3 September 1950 Semi-final	St. Finbarr's	4-06 - 1-07	Rathluirc	Cork Athletic Grounds, Cork
	J Ring 1-2, S Leddy 1-2, J Dooley 1-0, J Grady 1-0, M Finn 0-2.		B Troy 1-2, D Flynn 0-2, M Toole 0-2, S Cronin 0-1.	Referee: C Conway (Blarney)

=== Final ===
17 September 1950 Final	Glen Rovers	2-08 - 0-05	St. Finbarr's	Cork Athletic Grounds, Cork
	J Lynch 1-0; D O'Sullivan 1-0; C Ring 0-2; S O'Brien 0-1; J Hartnett 0-2; D Twomey 0-1; D O'Donovan 0-1; F Corcoran 0-1.		J Ring 0-2; S Condon 0-2; M Finn 0-1.	Referee: B Thornhill (Buttevant)

== Championship statistics ==
=== Miscellaneous ===
- Michael O’Brien trains Glen Rovers to a record 13th title.
- Jack Lynch wins, at the time. a record eleventh title.
