= 1945 Cork Senior Hurling Championship =

Annual hurling competition season

- Dates: 13 May 1945 – 16 September 1945
- Teams: 11
- Champions: Glen Rovers (10th title); Paddy O'Donovan (captain)
- Runners-up: Carrigdhoun

Tournament statistics
- Matches played: 10
- Goals scored: 84 (8.4 per match)
- Points scored: 96 (9.6 per match)

The 1945 Cork Senior Hurling Championship was the 57th staging of the Cork Senior Hurling Championship since its establishment by the Cork County Board in 1887. The draw for the opening round fixtures took place at the Cork Convention on 28 January 1945. The championship began on 13 May 1945 and ended on 16 September 1945.

Glen Rovers were the defending champions.

On 16 September 1945, Glen Rovers won the championship following a 4–10 to 5–3 defeat of Carrigdhoun in the final. This was their 10th championship title overall and their second title in succession.

== Results ==
=== First round ===
| 13 May 1945 First round | Ballincollig | 6-03 - 3-04 | Army | Cork Athletic Grounds, Cork |

| 20 May 1945 First round | Muskerry | 2-04 - 5-08 | Seandún | Coachford Sportsfield, Coachford |

| 20 May 1945 First round | Carrigdhoun | 4-04 - 4-02 | Blackrock | The Mardyke, Cork |

| 17 June 1945 First round | Carbery | 1-00 - 5-04 | Glen Rovers | Clonakilty Town Park, Clonakilty |
| | T O'Brien 1-0. | | C Ring 1-1, J Young 0-3. | Referee: J Murphy (Innishannon) |

| 17 June 1945 First round | Carrigtwohill | 2-06 - 6-12 | St. Finbarr's | Riverstown Sportsfield, Sallybrook |

- Sarsfields received a bye in this round.

=== Second round ===
| 10 June 1945 Second round | Sarsfields | 5-02 - 6-02 | Ballincollig | Cork Athletic Grounds, Cork |

| 22 July 1945 Second round | Seandún | 1-04 - 4-08 | Carrigdhoun | The Mardyke, Cork |

- Glen Rovers and St. Finbarr's received byes in this round.

=== Semi-finals ===
| 19 August 1945 Semi-final | Glen Rovers | 10-08 - 2-03 | St. Finbarr's | Cork Athletic Grounds, Cork |
| | J Buckley 4-0, J Kelly 2-3, C Ring 1-5, C Tobin 2-0, Twomey 1-0, J Young 0-1. | | D Beckett 1-1, T O'Sullivan 1-0, S Condon 0-2. |

| 26 August 1945 Semi-final | Carrigdhoun | 6-08 - 3-01 | Ballincollig | The Mardyke, Cork |

=== Final ===
| 16 September 1945 Final | Glen Rovers | 4-10 - 5-03 | Carrigdhoun | Cork Athletic Grounds, Cork |
| | C Ring 0-6; J Lynam 0-1; J Buckley 1-1; J Hartnett 1-0; C Tobin 1-1; C O'Flaherty 1-0; D Twomey 0-1. | | R O'Regan 0-2; D Dunne 2-0; R Andrews 1-0; M Herlihy 1-1; J Barrett 1-0. | Attendance: 11,470 |

== Championship statistics ==
=== Miscellaneous ===
- Carrigdhoun became the first divisional side to qualify for the championship final.
