= 1949 Cork Senior Hurling Championship =

Annual hurling competition season

- Dates: 10 April 1949 – 18 September 1949
- Teams: 11
- Champions: Glen Rovers (12th title); Dave Creedon (captain)
- Runners-up: Imokilly

Tournament statistics
- Matches played: 10
- Goals scored: 84 (8.4 per match)
- Points scored: 99 (9.9 per match)

The 1949 Cork Senior Hurling Championship was the 61st staging of the Cork Senior Hurling Championship since its establishment by the Cork County Board in 1887. The draw for the opening round fixtures was made at the Cork Convention on 30 January 1949. The championship began on 10 April 1949 and ended on 18 September 1949.

Glen Rovers were the defending champions.

On 18 September 1949, Glen Rovers won the championship following a 6–5 to 0–14 defeat of Imokilly in the final. This was their 12th championship title overall and their second title in succession.

== Results ==
=== First round ===
10 April 1949 First round	Carbery	2-03 - 8-01	Muskerry	Innishannon Sportsfield, Innishannon

10 April 1949 First round	Avondhu	3-05 - 8-04	Imokilly	Fitzgerald Memorial Park, Fermoy

8 May 1949 First round	Carrigdhoun	4-03 - 6-05	Sarsfields	Cork Athletic Grounds, Cork

15 May 1949 First round	University College Cork	2-05 - 3-07	St. Finbarr's	Cork Athletic Grounds, Cork

12 June 1949 First round	Glen Rovers	2-08 - 2-02	Blackrock	Cork Athletic Grounds, Cork
	J Lynch 1-3, D O'DOnovan 1-0, C Ring 0-3, J Lynam 0-1, S O'Brien 0-1.		EJ O'Sullivan 1-0, F Healy 1-0, D Hayes 0-1.

=== Second round ===
5 June 1949 Second round	Rathluirc	6-03 - 4-04	Muskerry	Kanturk Sportsfield, Kanturk

24 July 1949 Second round	Imokilly	5-08 - 5-04	Sarsfields	Cork Athletic Grounds, Cork

=== Semi-finals ===
31 July 1949 Semi-final	Glen Rovers	3-11 - 0-07	St. Finbarr's	Cork Athletic Grounds, Cork
	J Lynch 0-6, D O'Donovan 1-1, J Hartnett 1-1, D Twomey 1-0, C Ring 0-3.		B Murphy 0-6, J Sargent 0-1.	Referee: D O'Mahony (Passage)

14 August 1949 Semi-final	Imokilly	8-06 - 5-02	Rathluirc	Cork Athletic Grounds, Cork

=== Final ===
18 September 1949 Final	Glen Rovers	5-07 - 3-02	Imokilly	Cork Athletic Grounds, Cork
	D Twomey 3-0; J Lynch 2-2; C Ring 1-0; C O'Flaherty 0-2; J Lynam 0-1.		E Cleary 0-5; S Fleming 0-4; WJ Daly 0-2; W Moore 0-1; P O'Neill 0-1; S Twomey 0-1.

== Championship statistics ==
=== Miscellaneous ===
- Divisional side Imokilly qualified for the championship final for the first time ever.
