= 1960 Cork Senior Hurling Championship =

Annual hurling competition season

- Dates: 24 April – 18 September 1960
- Teams: 15
- Champions: Glen Rovers (18th title); Joe Twomey (captain)
- Runners-up: University College Cork

Tournament statistics
- Matches played: 15
- Goals scored: 99 (6.6 per match)
- Points scored: 202 (13.47 per match)
- Top scorer(s): John Joe Browne (2-17)

The 1960 Cork Senior Hurling Championship was the 72nd staging of the Cork Senior Hurling Championship since its establishment by the Cork County Board in 1887. The draw for the opening round fixtures took place at the Cork Convention on 31 January 1960. The championship began on 24 April 1960 and ended on 18 September 1960.

Glen Rovers entered the championship as the defending champions.

On 18 September 1960, Glen Rovers won the championship following a 3–08 to 1–12 defeat of University College Cork in the final. This was their 18th championship title overall and their third title in succession.

University College Cork's John Joe Browne was the championship's top scorer with 2–17.

== Team changes ==
=== To Championship ===
Promoted from the Cork Intermediate Hurling Championship

- Mallow

== Results ==
=== First round ===
| 24 April 1960 First round | Carbery | 5-05 - 1-04 | Duhallow | Castle Grounds |
| | C Corcoran 2-2, D Donovan 2-0, E Young 1-1, D White 0-2. | | W Leary 1-2, C Collins 0-2. | Referee: L Baker (Ballincollig) |

| 24 April 1960 First round | St Finbarr's | 2-06 - 4-10 | Seandún | Cork Athletic Grounds |
| | M Finn 1-5, D Lehane 1-0, B Studdard 1-0 (og), T O'Mullane 0-1. | | J Barry 1-3, V Barrett 1-3, B Hurley 1-1, P Curley 0-1, B Murphy 0-1, M Donoghue 0-1. | Referee: D Creedon (Glen Rovers) |

| 24 April 1960 First round | Imokilly | 6-04 - 6-05 | Sarsfields | Midleton Grounds |
| | G O'Gorman 2-2, J O'Connell 2-1, D Hegarty 1-0, J Griffin 1-0, L Driscoll 0-1. | | L Dowling 3-1, P Barry 2-0, T Sullivan 1-0, T Murphy 0-1, M Kenny 0-1, D Hurley 0-1, J O'Connor 0-1. | Referee: M O'Connell (St. Vincent's) |

| 8 May 1960 First round | Na Piarsaigh | 3-05 - 3-08 | University College Cork | The Mardyke |
| | D Sheehan 2-0, J Goold 0-4, L Joyce 1-0, P Allen 0-1. | | S Long 2-3, T Riordan 1-0, JJ Browne 0-2, B Hounihan 0-1, N Gallagher 0-1, M Mortell 0-1. |

| 8 May 1960 First round | Blackrock | 6-08 - 1-04 | Carrigtwohill | Riverstown Sportsfield |
| | M Murphy 2-0, S Horgan 2-0, N O'Connell 1-1, F Mahony 1-0, P Sullivan 0-3, L Galligan 0-2, J Bennett 0-1, T Connolly 0-1. | | V O'Connor 1-0, J Whyte 0-3, M Fouhy 0-1. | Referee: P O'Leary (Sarsfields) |

| 8 May 1960 First round | Muskerry | 2-08 - 2-03 | Mallow | Miillstreet Grounds |
| | J Barry-Murphy 1-3, M Murphy 1-0, D O'Sullivan 0-3, O'Connor 0-1, M Gaffey 0-1. | | B Nagle 2-0, J O'Donoghue 0-3. |

| 8 May 1960 First round | Carrigdhoun | 4-10 - 7-04 | Glen Rovers | Manning Park |
| | J Cooney 2-1, S Nyhan 1-4, Sisk 1-1, Desmond 0-2, S Kelly 0-2. | | C Ring 4-1, É Goulding 1-1, P Healy 1-1 P Harte 1-0, J Twomey 0-1. | Referee: T Cronin (St. Finbarr's) |

=== Quarter-finals ===
| 22 May 1960 Quarter-final | Carbery | 2-02 - 2-10 | Seandún | Ballinhassig Grounds |

| 19 June 1960 Quarter-final | Muskerry | 4-08 - 2-05 | Avondhu | Bishop Casey Memorial Park |
| | P Cremin 3-2, P Carroll 1-0, J Murphy 0-3, C Sheehan 0-2, M Barry 0-1. | | J Browne 1-1, P Behan 1-1, P Cronin 0-1, J O'Donovan 0-1, M O'Toole 0-1. | Referee: J Flynn (Banteer) |

| 26 June 1960 Quarter-final | University College Cork | 2-12 - 4-06 | Sarsfields | Cork Athletic Grounds |
| | D Murphy 2-2, M Mortell 0-3, S Long 0-2, N Gallagher 0-2, T O'Riordan 0-1, JJ Browne 0-1, D McDonnell 0-1. | | L Dowling 2-0, T Murphy 0-5, P Barry 1-0, J Lotty 1-0, T O'Sullivan 0-1. |

| 8 July 1960 Quarter-final replay | University College Cork | 6-11 - 5-07 | Sarsfields | Cork Athletic Grounds |
| | JJ Browne 1-6, T Riordan 2-1, M Mortell 1-2, D Murphy 1-1, S Long 1-0, N Gallagher 0-1. | | T Murphy 2-2, P Barry 1-1, T Sullivan 1-1, L Dowling 1-0, D Hurley 0-2, R Lotty 0-1. |

| 10 July 1960 Quarter-final | Glen Rovers | 4-05 - 1-08 | Blackrock | Cork Athletic Grounds |
| | J Clifford 2-0, M Quane 1-2, B Carroll 1-0, C Ring 0-2, É Goulding 0-1. | | W Galligan 1-6, P O'Sullivan 0-1, J Bennett 0-1, | Referee: P Cronin (St. Finbarr's) |

=== Semi-finals ===
| 24 July 1960 Semi-final | University College Cork | 3-05 - 1-08 | Seandún | The Mardyke |
| | S Long 2-0, M Mortell 1-0, JJ Browne 0-3, D Murphy 0-1, D McDonnell 0-1. | | T Dunphy 1-0, V Barrett 0-4, B Hurley 0-2, B O'Shea 0-1, J Coughlan 0-1. | Referee: P Cronin (St. Finbarr's) |

| 21 August 1960 Semi-final | Glen Rovers | 4-07 - 3-04 | Muskerry | Coachford Sportsfield |
| | M Quane 2-0, B Carroll 2-0, É Goulding 0-2, J Clifford 0-2, C Ring 0-2, J O'Sullivan 0-1. | | P Cremin 2-0, D Sullivan 1-0, J White 0-2, C Sheehan 0-1, J Cootes 0-1. | Referee: P Cronin (St. Finbarr's) |

=== Final ===
| 18 September 1960 Final | Glen Rovers | 3-08 - 1-12 | University College Cork | Athletic Grounds |
| | M Quane 2-1; J Twomey 1-0; C Ring 0-3; J Clifford 0-2; W Carroll 0-1; J Daly 0-1. | | J Browne 1-5; S Long 0-1; M Mortell 0-2; M Murphy 0-2; T Riordan 0-1; N Gallagher 0-1. | Attendance: 20,000 |

== Championship statistics ==
=== Top scorers ===
Top scorer overall

| Rank | Player | Club | Tally | Total | Matches | Average |
|---|---|---|---|---|---|---|
| 1 | John Joe Browne | UCC | 2-17 | 23 | 5 | 4.60 |
| 2 | Steve Long | UCC | 5-06 | 21 | 5 | 4.20 |
| 3 | Christy Ring | Glen Rovers | 4-08 | 20 | 4 | 5.00 |
| 4 | Liam Dowling | Sarsfields | 6-01 | 19 | 3 | 6.33 |
| 5 | Mick Quane | Glen Rovers | 5-03 | 18 | 4 | 4.50 |

Top scorers in a single game

| Rank | Player | Club | Tally | Total | Opposition |
|---|---|---|---|---|---|
| 1 | Christy Ring | Glen Rovers | 4-01 | 13 | Carrigdhoun |
| 2 | Paddy Cremin | Muskerry | 3-02 | 11 | Avondhu |
| 3 | Liam Dowling | Sarsfields | 3-01 | 10 | Imokilly |
| 4 | Steve Long | UCC | 2-03 | 9 | Na Piarsaigh |
| 4 | John Joe Browne | UCC | 1-06 | 9 | Sarsfields |
| 4 | Billy Galligan | Blackrock | 1-06 | 9 | Glen Rovers |
| 7 | C. Corcoran | Carbery | 2-02 | 8 | Duhallow |
| 7 | G. O'Gorman | Imokilly | 2-02 | 8 | Sarsfields |
| 7 | Donie Murphy | UCC | 2-02 | 8 | Sarsfields |
| 7 | Timmy Murphy | Sarsfields | 2-02 | 8 | UCC |
| 7 | Mossie Finn | St. Finbarr's | 1-05 | 8 | Seandún |
| 7 | John Joe Browne | UCC | 1-05 | 8 | Glen Rovers |
