= 1948 Cork Senior Hurling Championship =

Annual hurling competition season

- Dates: 4 April 1948 – 17 October 1948
- Teams: 11
- Champions: Glen Rovers (11th title); Jim Young (captain)
- Runners-up: Blackrock; Eddie John O'Sullivan (captain)

Tournament statistics
- Matches played: 10
- Goals scored: 72 (7.2 per match)
- Points scored: 94 (9.4 per match)

The 1948 Cork Senior Hurling Championship was the 60th staging of the Cork Senior Hurling Championship since its establishment by the Cork County Board in 1887. The draw for the opening round fixtures was made at the Cork Convention on 25 January 1949. The championship began on 4 April 1948 and ended on 17 October 1948.

St. Finbarr's were the defending champions.

On 17 October 1948, Glen Rovers won the championship following a 5–7 to 3–2 defeat of Blackrock in the final. This was their 11th championship title overall and their first in three championships seasons.

== Results ==
=== First round ===
4 April 1948 First round	Carbery	5-01 - 10-03	Sarsfields	Innishannon

18 April 1948 First round	Imokilly	10-06 - 3-01	Rathluirc	Fitzgerald Memorial Park, Fermoy

25 April 1948 First round	University College Cork	1-02 - 1-04	Carrigdhoun	Kinsale

25 April 1948 First round	Avondhu	4-01 - 5-07	Glen Rovers	Buttevant

13 June 1948 First round	Blackrock	1-09 - 0-02	St. Finbarr's	Cork Athletic Grounds, Cork

- Muskerry received a bye

=== Second round ===
25 April 1948 Second round	Muskerry	2-05 - 5-08	Sarsfields	Ballincollig Sportsfield, Ballincollig

29 August 1948 Second round	Imokilly	2-07 - 6-09	Blackrock	Cork Athletic Grounds, Cork

- Glen Rovers and Carrigdhoun received byes

=== Semi-finals ===
12 September 1948 Semi-final	Glen Rovers	6-05 - 0-04	Carrigdhoun	Cork Athletic Grounds, Cork
	C Ring 1-4, D Twomey 2-0, J Lynch 2-0, D O'Donovan 1-1.		D Slyne 0-1, S McDonald 0-1, J Weste 0-1, B Barry 0-1.

26 September 1948 Semi-final	Blackrock	2-05 - 1-06	Sarsfields	Cork Athletic Grounds, Cork

=== Final ===
17 October 1948 Final	Glen Rovers	5-07 - 3-02	Blackrock	Athletic Grounds, Cork
	C O'Flaherty 2-0; J Lynam 2-0; J Tierney 0-1; J Hartnett 1-1; J Lynch 0-4; C Ring 0-1.		G O'Riordan 1-0; J Quirke 1-1; D Hayes 1-0; M O'Riordan 0-1.	Attendance: 25,000
