= Blackpool, Cork =

Blackpool An Linn Dubh
- Suburb
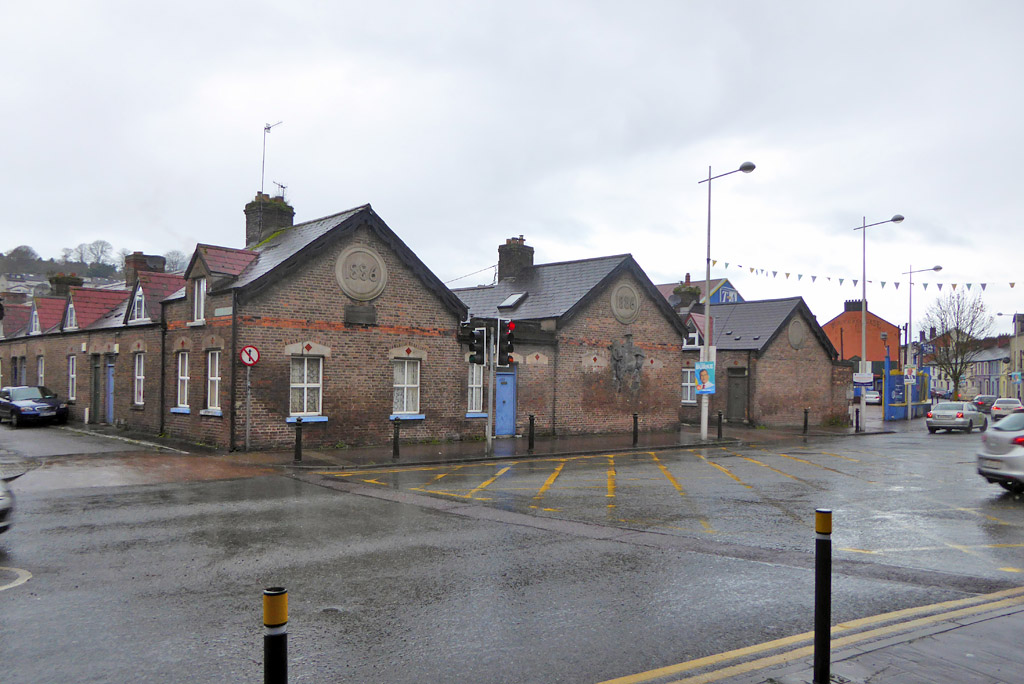
- Maddens Buildings on the Watercourse Road in Blackpool

- Location in Ireland
- Coordinates: 51°54′40″N 8°28′21″W
- Country: Ireland
- Province: Munster
- County: County Cork
- Time zone: UTC+0 (WET)
  - Summer (DST): UTC+1 (IST (WEST))

Blackpool (Irish: An Linn Dubh) is a suburb of Cork city in County Cork, Ireland. It is situated in the north of the city, on the N20 road to Mallow. Blackpool is part of the Cork North-Central Dáil constituency.

== History ==
The first official reference to Blackpool in Cork City as an urban centre was in relation to the building of a Guard House in 1734 mentioned in the Cork Corporation minute book. Its early development can be traced to its being on the main thoroughfare from Cork City to the north, with roads leading to the important destinations of Mallow, Limerick and Dublin. Dublin Street and Hill in Blackpool were named after this route.

Weaving became identified with Blackpool from its early beginnings and it was later recalled that the cabins of Blackpool were a hive of wool combing and weaving. The success of weaving in Blackpool can in part be attributable to British Army and Naval contracts that accrued to the area. The Revolutionary War period (1793–1815) was a buoyant time for weaving in Blackpool as a result. But after the war ended and the Act of Union of 1801 eventually allowed cheaper industrial clothing to invade the Irish market it marked the end of the cabin weaving industry of Blackpool. Many of the weavers from Blackpool emigrated to Britain. Thereafter Blackpool had a concentration of industries such as tanning, bacon curing, brewing and distilling.

Many of the Blackpool's residents formerly depended on the industrial employment offered by companies such as Gouldings, Harringtons, Dennys, Sunbeam, Irish Distillers and Murphy's Brewery. There are many clubs associated with Blackpool which grew over the years including the Harriers, St Finbarr's Pipe Band, Glen Boxing Club, and Glen Rovers hurling club.

Blackpool's Roman Catholic parish church, the Church of the Annunciation, was designed by noted stone carver Séamus Murphy who worked in the locality. The building of this church, completed in 1945 to replace the earlier St Nicholas Church, was funded by the Dwyer family who owned the nearby Sunbeam textile complex, and their staff with weekly collections.

In the mid 2020's Irish Rail announced plans to develop a commuter railway station in the area.

== Sport ==
Glen Rovers GAA is the local Gaelic Athletic Association club.

== Notable people ==
- Thomas Deenihan (born 1967), Roman Catholic prelate, current Bishop of Meath
- Charlie Hurley (born 1936), retired footballer and football manager
- Jack Lynch (1917 – 1999), Taoiseach and Gaelic games player
- Pat Lynch (1933 – 2018), singer
- Christy Ring (1920 – 1979), hurler
