= 1944 Cork Senior Hurling Championship =

Annual hurling competition season

- Dates: 30 April 1944 – 22 October 1944
- Teams: 11
- Champions: Glen Rovers (9th title); Din Joe Buckley (captain)
- Runners-up: St. Finbarr's

Tournament statistics
- Matches played: 11
- Goals scored: 72 (6.55 per match)
- Points scored: 110 (10 per match)

The 1944 Cork Senior Hurling Championship was the 56th staging of the Cork Senior Hurling Championship since its establishment by the Cork County Board in 1887. The draw for the opening round fixtures took place at the Cork Convention on 30 January 1944. The championship began on 30 April 1944 and ended on 22 October 1944.

St. Finbarr's were the defending champions.

On 22 October 1944, Glen Rovers won the championship following a 5–7 to 3–3 defeat of St. Finbarr's in the final. This was their 9th championship title overall and their first in three championship seasons.

== Results ==
=== First round ===
30 April 1944 First round	Sarsfields	4-06 - 2-03	University College Cork	Cork Athletic Grounds, Cork

7 May 1944 First round	Muskerry	1-02 - 3-07	Glen Rovers	The Mardyke, Cork
	D O'Donoghue 1-0, C Moynihan 0-1, J Leahy 0-1.		D Leahy 1-2, J Lynam 1-0, D O'Donovan 1-0, P O'Leary 0-3, C Ring 0-2.

14 May 1944 First round	Ballincollig	6-03 - 4-01	Carrigdhoun	The Mardyke, Cork

28 May 1944 First round	Carbery	2-03 - 7-05	Carrigtwohill	Cork Athletic Grounds, Cork

28 May 1944 First round	Army	3-03 - 2-07	St. Finbarr's	Cork Athletic Grounds, Cork

- Blackrock received a bye in this round.

=== Second round ===
21 May 1944 Second round	Blackrock	2-03 - 1-07	Sarsfields	Cork Athletic Grounds, Cork

20 August 1944 Second round	Glen Rovers	8-07 - 3-05	Ballincollig	The Mardyke, Cork
	C Tobin 4-1, J Buckley 2-0, D Leahy 2-0, C Ring 0-2, J Kelly 0-2, J Murphy 0-1.		D McCarthy 1-1, P Healy 1-0, V Lynch 1-0, M Kavanagh 0-2, M O'Connor 0-1, D Lynch 0-1.

- Carrigtwohill and St. Finbarr's received byes in this round.

=== Semi-finals ===
17 September 1944 Semi-final	St. Finbarr's	3-09 - 3-09	Carrigtwohill	Cork Athletic Grounds, Cork

24 September 1944 Semi-final	Glen Rovers	5-08 - 1-04	Sarsfields	Cork Athletic Grounds, Cork
	C Tobin 2-1, C Ring 0-5, Twomey 1-0, D Leahy 1-0, J Lynam 0-2.		A Lotty 1-1, M Brennan 0-1, Bowman 0-1, Barry 0-1.	Referee: D Maher (Blackrock)

8 October 1944 Semi-final replay	St. Finbarr's	4-06 - 0-02	Carrigtwohill	Cork Athletic Grounds, Cork

=== Final ===
22 October 1944 Final	Glen Rovers	5-07 - 3-03	St. Finbarr's	Athletic Grounds, Cork
	D Leahy 1-0; C Tobin 1-1; J Buckley 1-0; J Lynam 1-0; C Ring 0-5; D Twomey 0-1; 1-0 scored by a defender.		P O'Flaherty 1-0; J O'Sullivan 1-0; D McCarthy 0-1; T O'Sullivan 1-0; T Mulcahy 0-1; S Condon 0-1.
