= 1954 Cork Senior Hurling Championship =

Annual hurling competition season

- Dates: 28 March 1954 – 26 September 1954
- Teams: 18
- Champions: Glen Rovers (15th title); Christy Ring (captain)
- Runners-up: Blackrock; Eddie John O'Sullivan (captain)

Tournament statistics
- Matches played: 18
- Goals scored: 128 (7.11 per match)
- Points scored: 192 (10.67 per match)

The 1954 Cork Senior Hurling Championship was the 66th staging of the Cork Senior Hurling Championship since its establishment by the Cork County Board in 1887. The draw for the opening round of the championship took place at the Cork Convention on 24 January 1954. The championship began on 28 March 1954 and ended on 26 September 1954.

Glen Rovers entered the championship as the defending champions.

On 26 September 1954, Glen Rovers won the championship following a 3–7 to 3–2 defeat of Blackrock in the final. This was their 15th championship title overall and their second title in succession.

== Team changes ==
=== To Championship ===
Promoted from the Cork Intermediate Hurling Championship

- Newtownshandrum

== Results ==
=== First round ===
| 28 March 1954 First round | Carrigtwohill | 3-04 - 2-07 | University College Cork | Clonmult Memorial Park, Midleton |

| 11 April 1954 First round | Carrigdhoun | 4-05 - 4-03 | Imokilly | Cork Athletic Grounds, Cork |

| 11 April 1954 First round | Sarsfields | 4-07 - 2-08 | Shanballymore | Fermoy Sportsfield, Fermoy |
| | D Hurley 1-1, J Barry 1-0, D Barry 1-0, J O'Neill 1-0, J Coleman 0-2, P Barry 0-2, D Healy 0-1, K Barry 0-1. | | D Griffin 1-2, M Hoare 1-1, V Fahy 0-2, W Griffin 0-1, K Fahy 0-1. |

| 11 April 1954 First round | Muskerry | 1-04 - 6-05 | Nemo Rangers | Coachford Sportsfield, Coachford |

| 18 April 1954 First round | Carbery | 2-01 - 5-06 | Duhallow | Macroom Sportsfield, Macroom |

| 25 April 1954 First round | Glen Rovers | 3-09 - 1-03 | St. Finbarr's | Cork Athletic Grounds, Cork |
| | C Ring 0-5, J Twomey 1-1, M Cronin 1-0 (og), D O'Sullivan 1-0, E Goulding 0-1, J Lynam 0-1, J Clifford 0-1. | | Melee goal 1-0, M Ryan 0-3. |

| 25 April 1954 First round | Avondhu | 1-02 - 5-05 | Blackrock | Buttevant Sportsfield, Buttevant |

| 9 May 1954 First round | Midleton | 7-04 - 3-03 | Seandún | Riverstown Sportsfield, Sallybrook |

| 9 May 1954 First round replay | Carrigtwohill | 7-03 - 2-04 | University College Cork | Cork Athletic Grounds, Cork |

| 30 May 1954 First round | Bandon | 2-03 - 1-04 | Newtownshandrum | Cork Athletic Grounds, Cork |

=== Second round ===
| 30 May 1954 Second round | Carrigdhoun | 7-08 - 8-01 | Duhallow | Bishop Casey Memorial Park, Mallow |

=== Quarter-finals ===
| 13 June 1954 Quarter-final | Glen Rovers | 8-14 - 4-02 | Midleton | Riverstown Sportsfield, Sallybrook |
| | J Cifford 3-2, D O'Sullivan 2-5, C Ring 2-2, J Lynam 1-0, J Hartnett 0-3, E Goulding 0-1, M Cullinane 0-1. | | S Fleming 1-0, G Wallis 1-1, E Moriarty 1-0, T Horgan 1-0, G Power 0-1. |

| 2 July 1954 Quarter-final | Nemo Rangers | 1-07 - 6-04 | Sarsfields | The Mardyke, Cork |

| 11 July 1954 Quarter-final | Carrigdhoun | 3-05 - 4-04 | Blackrock | Cork Athletic Grounds, Cork |
| | | | | Referee: C Conway (Blarney) |

| 1 August 1954 Quarter-final | Bandon | 5-03 - 0-06 | Carrigtwohill | Cork Athletic Grounds, Cork |

=== Semi-finals ===
| 22 August 1954 Semi-final | Glen Rovers | 3-14 - 4-04 | Sarsfields | Cork Athletic Grounds, Cork |
| | C Ring 1-7, J Twomey 1-2, J Carroll 1-0, D O'Sullivan 0-2, J Lynam 0-1, J Clifford 0-1, J Rodgers 0-1. | | P Barry 2-0, D Barry 1-1, J O'Neill 1-1, N Murphy 0-1, D Hurley 0-1,. | Referee: C Conway (Blarney) |

| 29 August 1954 Semi-final | Blackrock | 4-15 - 0-06 | Bandon | Cork Athletic Grounds, Cork |

=== Final ===
| 26 September 1954 Final | Glen Rovers | 3-07 - 3-02 | Blackrock | Cork Athletic Grounds, Cork |
| | J Rodgers 1-1; J Hartnett 1-0; J Lynam 1-0; C Ring 0-3; E Goulding 0-3. | | S Horgan 1-1; T Furlong 1-0; EJ O'Sullivan 1-0; F O'Mahony 0-1. |

== Championship statistics ==
=== Miscellaneous ===
- Newtownshandrum make their first appearance at senior level.
- Glen Rovers sister club St. Nicholas' also won the Cork Football Championship to complete the double for the third time.
