= Seandún GAA =

Gaelic games division in County Cork, Ireland

Seandún
- Seandún
- Founded: 1925
- County: Cork
- Colours
- Grounds: Ballinlough Grounds

Playing kits
Standard colours

Seandún GAA is a Gaelic Athletic Association division in Cork, Ireland. The division, one of eight affiliated to the Cork County Board, organises its own junior grade competitions in both hurling and Gaelic football.

== History ==
Centred around Cork city and its wider hinterland, Seandún GAA Division was founded on 1 April 1925. The division derives its name from Shandon, whose bells are a symbol of Cork city and form part of the division's crest. Seandún was one of a number of divisions established around that time in an effort to improve the administrative organisation of the GAA in Cork and to provide competitions for the ever-increasing number of clubs, particularly at junior level. Respective competitions in both hurling and Gaelic football were organised in 1926, with College Rovers becoming the inaugural winner of the City JHC and Geraldines claiming the City JFC.

Seandún fielded a hurling team in the Cork SHC for the first time in 1934. The team was composed of players from junior and intermediate clubs in the division and reached the semi-finals. Seandún has reached six semi-finals in total but has never contested a final. Seandún has also fielded a Gaelic football team in the Cork SFC. The division's only semi-final appearance ended with a defeat by Clonakilty in 1968.

Further B-grade and C-grade competitions in both hurling and Gaelic football were created by the Seandún Board over time. The Seandún divisional teams' participation in the respective Cork SHC and SFC has been sporadic in recent times.

== Member clubs ==
- Ballinure
- Ballyphehane
- Bishopstown
- Blackrock
- Brian Dillons
- Delaney Rovers
- Douglas
- Fr. O'Callaghan's
- Glanmire
- Glen Rovers
- Gurranabraher
- Lough Rovers
- Mayfield
- MTU Cork
- Na Laochra Aeracha
- Na Piarsaigh
- Nemo Rangers
- Passage West
- Rathpeacon
- Redmonds
- Rochestown
- Shandon Rovers
- St Finbarr's
- St Michael's
- St. Nicholas'
- St Vincent's
- UCC
- Whitechurch
- White's Cross

== Competitions ==
- Cork City Junior A Football Championship
- Cork City Junior A Hurling Championship
- Cork City Junior B Football Championship
- Cork City Junior B Hurling Championship
- Cork City Junior C Football Championship
- Cork City Junior C Hurling Championship
- Seandun Cup Football
- Flor McCarthy Cup

== Hurling ==
=== 2027 Championship Grades ===
Championship	Club
Senior Championships
Premier Senior	Seandún
Premier Senior	Blackrock
Premier Senior	Glen Rovers
Premier Senior	MTU Cork
Premier Senior	St Finbarr's
Premier Senior	UCC
Senior A	Douglas
Senior A	Na Piarsaigh
Intermediate Championships
Premier Intermediate	None
Intermediate A	Blackrock (2)
Intermediate A	Bishopstown
Junior Championships
Premier Junior	Glen Rovers (2)
Premier Junior	Mayfield
Premier Junior	Nemo Rangers
Premier Junior	St Finbarr's (2)
Junior A	Blackrock (3)
Junior A	Douglas (2)
Junior A	Glen Rovers (3)
Junior A	Na Piarsaigh (2)
Junior A	Passage West
Junior A	St Vincent's
Junior A	Whitechurch
Junior A	White's Cross
Junior B	Ballyphehane
Junior B	Bishopstown (2)
Junior B	Blackrock (4)
Junior B	Brian Dillons
Junior B	Delaney Rovers
Junior B	Douglas (3)
Junior B	Glen Rovers (4)
Junior B	Lough Rovers
Junior B	Mayfield (2)
Junior B	Na Piarsaigh (3)
Junior B	Nemo Rangers (2)
Junior B	Passage West (2)
Junior B	Rathpeacon
Junior B	St Finbarr's (3)
Junior B	St Vincent's (2)
Junior B	Whitechurch (2)

== Football ==
=== 2027 Championship Grades ===
Championship	Club
Senior Championships
Premier Senior	Seandún
Premier Senior	Douglas
Premier Senior	MTU Cork
Premier Senior	Nemo Rangers
Premier Senior	St Finbarr's
Premier Senior	UCC
Senior A	Bishopstown
Senior A	St Michael's
Intermediate Championships
Premier Intermediate	Nemo Rangers (2)
Intermediate A	Glanmire
Intermediate A	St Finbarr's (2)
Junior Championships
Premier Junior	St. Nicholas'
Premier Junior	St Vincent's
Junior A	Ballyphehane
Junior A	Bishopstown (2)
Junior A	Douglas (2)
Junior A	Glanmire (2)
Junior A	Mayfield
Junior A	Na Piarsaigh
Junior A	Nemo Rangers (3)
Junior A	Passage West
Junior A	St Michael's (2)
Junior A	Whitechurch
Junior A	White's Cross
Junior B	Bishopstown (3)
Junior B	Brian Dillons
Junior B	Delaney Rovers
Junior B	Douglas (3)
Junior B	Glanmire (3)
Junior B	Mayfield (2)
Junior B	Na Piarsaigh (2)
Junior B	Nemo Rangers (4)
Junior B	Passage West (2)
Junior B	Rathpeacon
Junior B	Rochestown
Junior B	St Finbarr's (3)
Junior B	St Michael's (3)
Junior B	St. Nicholas' (2)
Junior B	St Vincent's (2)
Junior C	Ballinure
Junior C	Ballyphehane (2)
Junior C	Glanmire (4)
Junior C	Douglas (4)
Junior C	Lough Rovers
Junior C	Na Laochra Aeracha
Junior C	Nemo Rangers (5)
Junior C	St Finbarr's (4)
Junior C	Whitechurch (2)
Junior C	White's Cross (2)
