= Glen Rovers GAA =

Gaelic games club in County Cork, Ireland

Glen Rovers
- Fánaithe an Ghleanna
- Founded: 1916
- County: Cork
- Nickname: The Glen
- Colours
- Grounds: Glen Field
- Coordinates: 51°54′23.05″N 8°28′02.80″W

Playing kits
Standard colours	Alternative colours

Senior Club Championships
	All Ireland	Munster champions	Cork champions
Hurling:	2	3	28
Camogie:	4	9	22

Glen Rovers Hurling Club is a Gaelic Athletic Association club located in Blackpool, Cork, Ireland. The club is affiliated to the Seandún Board and the Cork County Board. As a sister club of St Nicholas' Gaelic Football Club, Glen Rovers is solely concerned with hurling.

== Foundation ==
Hurling had been played in Blackpool for many years, with areas like the Commons Road and Thomas Davis Street forming and fielding teams from time to time. A number of Blackpool-based players joined the nearby Brian Dillons club and won the Cork MHC title in 1915. Due to ongoing World War I shortages, the set of winners' medals were never presented. The ill-feeling regarding the non-presentation of the medals later resurfaced, when a number of the Blackpool-based players left Brian Dillons in 1916 and established a new club called Glen Rovers.

== History ==
From its foundation, the Glen Rovers Hurling Club was competitive in the minor and junior grades. Consecutive Cork MHC titles were won in 1922 and 1923, before the club claimed the Cork JHC title in 1924. The success continued the following year when a Paddy Collins-captained team won the Cork IHC title and secured senior status, just a decade after the foundation of the club. Within four years, Glen Rovers had reached their first Cork SHC final, however, they were beaten by reigning champions Blackrock.

Glen Rovers won their first Cork SHC title in 1934, following a 3–02 to 0–06 win over St Finbarr's in the final. An estimated crowd in excess of 25,000 made it the biggest attendance at a county final in the history of the GAA, nationwide. This win began an unprecedented run of success, which resulted in the Glen winning a record eight consecutive Cork SHC titles up to 1941. These teams were backboned by such players as Jack Lynch, the Buckley brothers - Din Joe and Connie - Dave Creedon, Josa Lee and, in 1941, Christy Ring. The Glen's great run of success ended with a semi-final defeat by Ballincollig in 1942.

Glen Rovers regained the Cork SHC title in 1944, following a defeat of reigning champions St Finbarr's, and continued their dominance of the competition. Ten Cork SHC titles were won between 1944 and 1960, with the 1958 title win putting the Glen second only to Blackrock on the all-time roll of honour. The 1960s saw Glen Rovers win a further five Cork SHC titles, as the club remained undefeated in finals that decade. Glen Rovers also became the inaugural winners of the Munster Club SHC title. Played in April 1966, the club secured the much-delayed 1964 title, with a 3-07 to 1-07 win over Thurles Sarsfields.

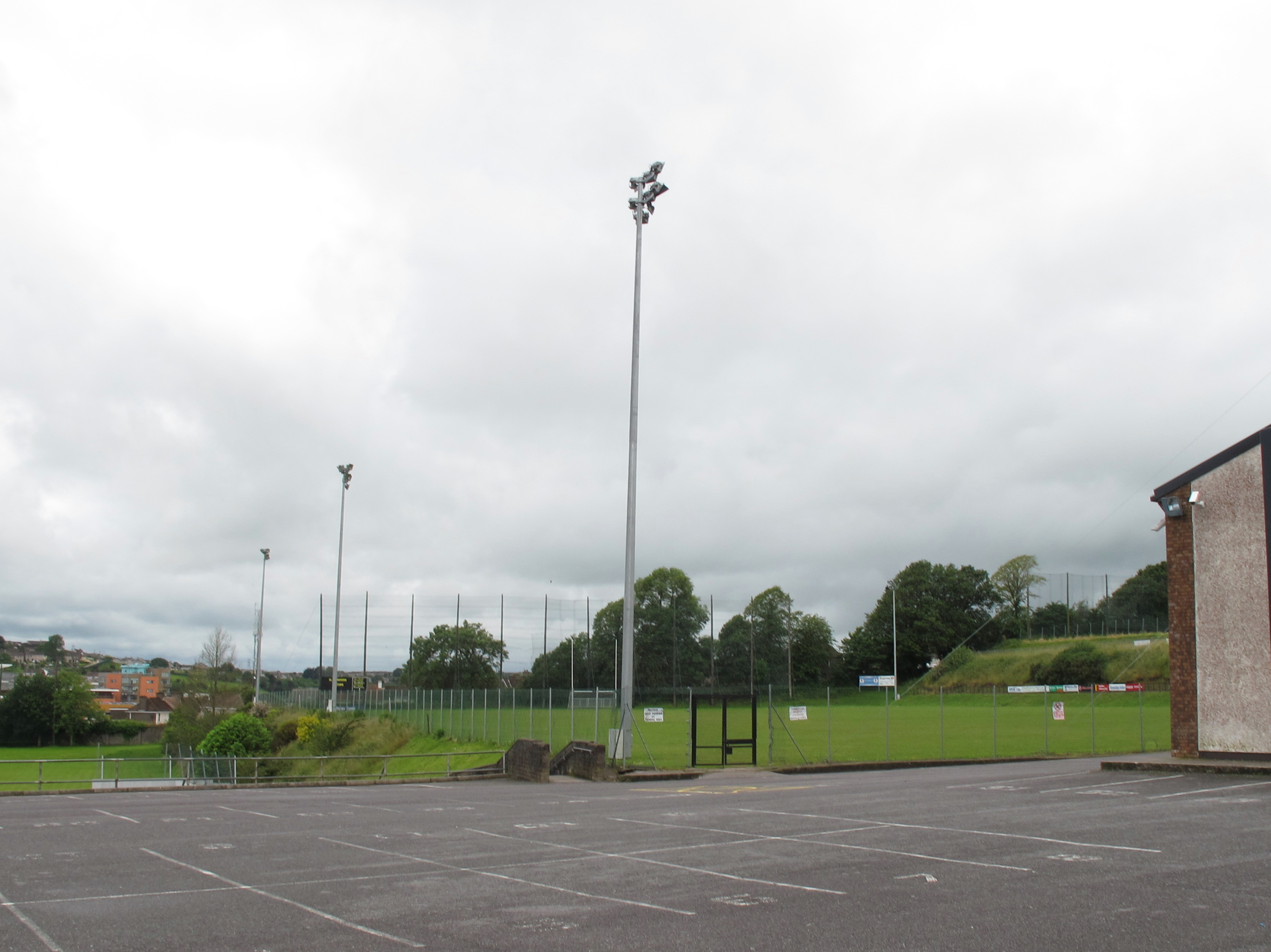
Glen Rovers Hurling Club

The 1970s saw Glen Rovers emerge with a new team which mixed youth and experience. New players, such as the O'Doherty brothers - Martin and Pat - Teddy O'Brien and Pat Barry, joined the more established players, like Jerry O'Sullivan, Patsy Harte and Denis Coughlan, to win the Cork SHC title in 1972, following a 3–15 to 1–10 win over Youghal. The club subsequently claimed their second Munster Club SHC title, before beating St Rynaghs by 10 points in the 1973 All-Ireland Club SHC final. Glen Rovers won their second All-Ireland Club SHC title in 1977, following a 2–12 to 0–08 win over Camross.

After a 14-year lapse, Glen Rovers won their 25th Cork SHC title in 1989 when a Tomás Mulcahy-captained side beat Sarsfields by 4–15 to 3–13 in the final. Consecutive titles in 2015 and 2016 brought another long lapse to an end, as the Glen reclaimed the outright second place on the all-time roll of honour. In September 2023, the club's 97-year tenure in the Cork SHC ended when they were relegated after losing a playoff to Kanturk. Glen Rovers made an immediate return to the top tier after claiming the Cork SAHC title in 2024, following a 3–17 to 1–13 defeat of Blarney.

== Crest and colours ==
When the club was formed, Glen Rovers had intended to wear a green, white and gold hooped jersey. The white was soon replaced with black in memory of the executed leaders of the 1916 Easter Rising. This distinctive three-tone jersey has been used ever since. The Glen Rovers crest features a modernised Celtic cross with the image of the north side glen in the centre. The crest also features two crossed hurleys.

== Honours ==
=== Hurling ===
- All-Ireland Senior Club Hurling Championship (2): 1973, 1977
- Munster Senior Club Hurling Championship (3): 1964, 1973, 1977
- Cork Premier Senior Hurling Championship (28): 1934, 1935, 1936, 1937, 1938, 1939, 1940, 1941, 1944, 1945, 1948, 1949, 1950, 1953, 1954, 1958, 1959, 1960, 1962, 1964, 1967, 1969, 1972, 1976, 1989, 2015, 2016, 2026
- Cork Senior A Hurling Championship (1): 2024
- Cork Intermediate A Hurling Championship (6): 1925, 1954, 1956, 1957, 1958, 1961, 1965
- Cork Junior Hurling Championship (2): 1924, 1950
- Seandún Junior A Hurling Championship (17): 1929, 1930, 1934, 1939, 1943, 1944, 1945, 1950, 1958, 1975, 1976, 1987, 1992, 1993, 1996, 2001, 2008
- Cork Under-21 Hurling Championship (7): 1974, 1984, 1995, 2001, 2008, 2023, 2023
- Cork Minor Hurling Championship (29): 1922, 1923, 1926, 1933, 1934, 1936, 1937, 1945, 1946, 1950, 1951, 1952, 1956, 1958, 1959, 1964, 1971, 1972, 1973, 1976, 1979, 1985, 2002, 2005, 2006, 2017, 2021, 2023, 2024

=== Camogie ===
- All-Ireland Senior Club Camogie Championship (4): 1986, 1990, 1992, 1993
- Munster Senior Club Camogie Championship (9): 1964, 1967, 1986, 1987, 1990, 1991, 1992, 1993, 1994
- Cork Senior Camogie Championship (22): 1950, 1951, 1954, 1957, 1958, 1962, 1963, 1964, 1965, 1966, 1967, 1968, 1983, 1986, 1987, 1990, 1991, 1992, 1993, 1994, 1995, 1996

== Notable players ==
- Connie Buckley: All-Ireland SHC-winning captain (1941)
- Jack Lynch: All-Ireland SHC-winning captain (1942)
- Tomás Mulcahy: All-Ireland SHC-winning captain (1990)
- Martin O'Doherty: All-Ireland SHC-winning captain (1977)
- Christy Ring: All-Ireland SHC-winning captain (1946, 1953, 1954)

== See also ==
- Blackrock–Glen Rovers hurling rivalry
- Glen Rovers–St Finbarr's hurling rivalry
