= 1954 All-Ireland Senior Hurling Championship final =

1954 All-Ireland Senior Hurling Final
- Event: 1954 All-Ireland Senior Hurling Championship
Cork	Wexford
1-9	1-6
- Date: 5 September 1954
- Venue: Croke Park, Dublin
- Referee: Jack Mulcahy (Kilkenny)
- Attendance: 84,856

The 1954 All-Ireland Senior Hurling Championship Final was the 67th All-Ireland Final and the culmination of the 1954 All-Ireland Senior Hurling Championship, an inter-county hurling tournament for the top teams in Ireland. The match was held at Croke Park, Dublin, on 5 September 1954, between Cork and Wexford. The Leinster champions lost to their Munster opponents on a score line of 1-9 to 1-6.

The game is notable for a number of reasons. The gates were closed 35 minutes before the start of the senior game due to the size of the crowd. A record 84,856 people were in attendance to see Christy Ring of Cork capture a record-breaking eighth All-Ireland winners' medal.

== All-Ireland final ==
=== Overview ===
Sunday 5 September was the date of the 1954 All-Ireland senior hurling final between Cork and Wexford. Cork were appearing in their third consecutive championship decider, having beaten Dublin and Galway to take the previous two titles. Wexford last appeared in the championship decider in 1951 when they lost out to Tipperary who captured their own three-in-a-row. They last won the All-Ireland title in 1910 when they defeated Limerick to take their first championship. Cork and Wexford last met each other in the championship more than half a century earlier in the All-Ireland final of 1901 with victory going to Cork. An interesting statistic at the time was that Wexford had never beaten Cork in the championship.

84,856 spectators turned out in Croke Park to see the All-Ireland hurling finals. The Wexford men had reached their second All-Ireland final in three years and looked capable of winning this one. Cork, on the other hand, looked forward to creating their own piece of history. A win would give them a third All-Ireland title in-a-row while on a personal level a win would give captain Christy Ring an eighth All-Ireland medal. The crowd of spectators also looked forward to a scoring shoot-out between Christy Ring and Wexford's Nicky Rackard.

=== Match report ===
At 3:15pm the sliothar was thrown-in and the game began in earnest. Cork got off to the better start when Éamonn Goulding, a future Cork dual player, latched onto the sliothar and deftly sent it over the bar for the opening score of the day. Shortly afterwards one of the biggest cheers of the day went up Christy Ring captured his first score of the day when he converted a 40-yard free. Wexford were visibly unnerved by the big occasion and the even bigger attendance and found it difficult to settle. Their first score of the day came from the stick of Nicky Rackard who later scored the equalizer after 20 minutes of play. Less than a minute later Ring was back in the thick of the action. He caught the sliothar, sidestepped three Wexford defenders and sent the sliothar sweetly over the crossbar to restore Cork's lead. He quickly increased his own personal tally by converting a free before passing the sliothar to Willie John Daly who captured Cork's final point of the opening 30 minutes. Wexford were equally accurate with their constant attacks on the Cork goal. A pointed free by Nicky Rackard was followed by the first goal of the day. Paddy Kehoe sent in the sliothar from a sideline cut before Tom Ryan tapped it into the net for the first goal of the game. At half-time the Wexford men had the narrowest of leads by 1-3 to 0-5.

Immediately after the restart Wexford got off to the better start courtesy of a Tim Flood point after a jinking solo run. With six minutes gone in the second half the Cork players found their rhythm again. A long clearance by Gerard Murphy fell to Christy Ring who weaved his way through the Wexford defenders. He was 30 yards out from the goal when he sent off a powerful shot that looked like a certain goal. The players and spectators were convinced that Ring had put Cork back in the lead, however, the umpire had his finger raised for a 70-yard free. There was no goal as the sliothar struck Wexford full-back Nick O'Donnell and went out over the end line. Such was the force of Ring's shot that the impact of the sliothar broke O’Donnell's collarbone and he had to retire from the game. Bobby Rackard was switched to the full-back position; however, it turned out to be a tactical error as his clearances failed to go as far as O’Donnell's. Ring sent over his fourth point of the game in the 40-second minute before Vincy Twomey moved outfield with the sliothar and sent another sweet shot between the posts. In spite of the onslaught Wexford clung on to their two-point lead, however, the turning point of the match was just around the corner. With four minutes left in the game 20-year-old Johnny Clifford became the hero of the day for Cork. Wexford goalkeeper Art Foley was caught out of position and off his goal line leaving Clifford with an easy shot into an almost empty net. Cork had regained the lead but only by the smallest of margins. It had given them some breathing space; however, Wexford launched one final attack. This failed and when Josie Hartnett sent over another point the title looked to be Cork's. Fittingly, the final score of the game came from the man who was about to make history. Christy Ring pointed to give Cork a 1-9 to 1-6 win and a third All-Ireland title in-a-row. Furthermore, the victory gave Ring a record-breaking eighth All-Ireland winners’ medal.

=== Statistics ===
1954-09-05
15:15 BST

Cork	1-9 – 1-6	Wexford
C. Ring (0-5); J. Clifford (1-0); É. Goulding (0-1); W.J. Daly (0-1); V. Twomey (0-1); J. Hartnett (0-1)		T. Ryan (1-0); N. Rackard (0-3); T. Flood (0-2); P. Kehoe (0-1)

Croke Park, Dublin
Attendance: 84,856
Referee: Jack Mulcahy (Kilkenny)

CORK:
GK	1	Dave Creedon
RCB	2	Gerry O'Riordan
FB	3	John Lyons
LCB	4	Tony O'Shaughnessy
RWB	5	Matty Fuohy
CB	6	Vincy Twomey
LWB	7	Derry Hayes
M	8	Gerald Murphy
M	9	Willie Moore
RWF	10	Willie John Daly
CF	11	Josie Hartnett
LWF	12	Christy Ring (c)
RCF	13	Johnny Clifford
FF	14	Éamonn Goulding
LCF	15	Paddy Barry
Substitutes:
LCF		Tom O'Sullivan

WEXFORD:
GK	1	Art Foley
RCB	2	Billy Rackard
FB	3	Nick O'Donnell
LCB	4	Mick O'Hanlon
RWB	5	Jim English
CB	6	Bobby Rackard
LWB	7	Ned Wheeler
M	8	Jim Morrissey
M	9	Séamus Hearne
RWF	10	Paddy Kehoe
CF	11	Tim Flood
LWF	12	Padge Kehoe (c)
RCF	13	Tom Ryan
FF	14	Nicky Rackard
LCF	15	Bobby Donovan
Substitutes:
CB		Tim Bolger
RWF		Dom Aherne

MATCH RULES

- 60 minutes.
- Replay if scores level.
- Three named substitutes

Cork Substitutes Tom O'Sullivan for Paddy Barry Unused Substitutes Jimmy Brohan, Donnie O'Sullivan, Mick Cashman Sean O'Brien Trainer Jim Tough Barry Selectors Andy Scannell, Paddy Fox Collins, Jack Barrett, Dinny Barry Murphy, Sean Og Murphy
