= Christy Ring =

Irish hurler (1920–1979)

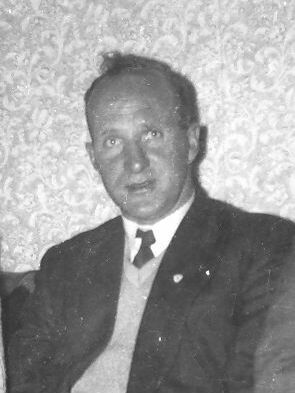
- Ring in 1956

Personal information
- Native name: Críostóir Ó Rinn (Irish)
- Nickname: Christy
- Born: 30 October 1920 Kilboy, Cloyne, County Cork, Ireland
- Died: 2 March 1979 (aged 58) Morrison's Island, Cork, Ireland
- Occupation: Oil delivery man
- Height: 5 ft 6 in (168 cm)

Sport
- Sport: Hurling
- Position: Centre-forward
Clubs
- Years: Club
- 1938–1940 1941–1967: Cloyne; Glen Rovers
Club titles
- Cork titles: 14
- Munster titles: 1
Inter-county*
Years	County	Apps (scores)
1939–1962	Cork	65 (33–208)
Inter-county titles
- Munster titles: 9
- All-Irelands: 8
- NHL: 4
- *Inter County team apps and scores correct as of 16:05, 17 May 2008 (UTC).

Nicholas Christopher Michael Ring (30 October 1920 – 2 March 1979) was an Irish hurler whose league and championship career at senior level with the Cork county team spanned twenty-four years from 1939 to 1963. He established many championship records, including career appearances (65), scoring tally (33–208) and number of All-Ireland medals won (8); however, these records were subsequently bested by a number of players. Ring is widely regarded as one of the greatest hurlers in the history of the game, with many former players, commentators and fans rating him as the number one player of all time.

== Early life ==
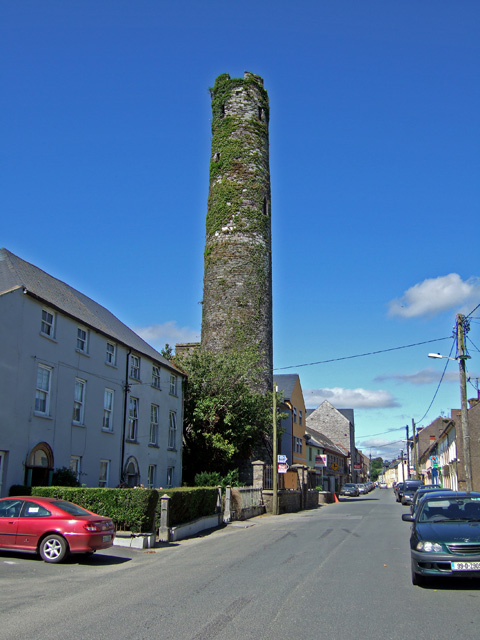
The village of Cloyne, birthplace of Christy Ring

Nicholas Christopher Michael Ring was the second youngest son of Nicholas (7 December 1892 – 12 March 1937) and Mary (née Lawton) Ring (1 November 1889 – 8 August 1953), and was born on 30 October 1920 at Kilboy Cross, less than a mile from the small town of Cloyne in rural East Cork. He had two brothers, Willie John and Paddy Joe, and two sisters – Katie and Mary Agnes. His family later moved to Cloyne where they lived in a house on Spittal Street, commonly referred to as Spit Lane. His father worked as a gardener for local landowners and, as a former Cloyne hurler, he instilled a passion for hurling in his young son by taking him to club games in Cork, making the eighteen-mile journey by bicycle with his son on the cross-bar.

Ring was educated at the local national school in Cloyne, where he was noted as a quiet but diligent pupil. The schoolmaster, Maurice Spillane, offered a prize of a hurley and sliotar to the boy who would get the highest grade in the school. Ring applied himself diligently and got first place among forty-eight pupils.

As was common at the time, Ring received no secondary education and left school before the age of fourteen. His first job was as an apprentice mechanic with the Williams firm in Midleton, before he later moved to Cork City where he became a lorry driver with Córas Iompair Éireann. In 1953 Ring became a delivery driver with Shell Oil.

== Club career ==
=== St. Enda's ===
Ring was twelve years old when he played in his first minor game for Cloyne. Playing in goal he received a baptism by fire against Sarsfields. Two years later he was at right wing-forward and claimed his first medal when Cloyne won the annual Glenbower tournament.

As Cloyne were unable to field a minor team by the end of the decade, Ring joined the St. Enda's amalgamation from Midleton in 1938. He won a county minor championship medal in this grade in 1938 following a 5–3 to 4–0 win over the Seán Clárach's club from Charleville.

=== Cloyne ===
Ring's impressive performance with St. Enda's was replicated with the Cloyne junior team that reached their first East Cork final. The Ring brothers were prominent from the start, with Willie John scoring 1–1 to help secure a 5–5 to 3–2 victory over Bride Rovers. Ring was sent off in the county championship quarter-final and was suspended for Cloyne's subsequent semi-final defeat by Brian Dillons.

Cloyne retained the East Cork title in 1939 following a 7–3 to 1–1 defeat of Aghada. Ring's scoring prowess brought subsequent county championship defeats of Clonakilty and Newtownshandrum as Cloyne qualified for their very first county junior championship final. In the days leading up to the match, there was much speculation that Ring would be unable to line out as he had an injured ankle. He started the game in the half-back line, however, as the game was going against Cloyne, Ring fought through the pain barrier and moved to the forwards where he scored five points. The 6–5 to 2–3 victory over Mayfield secured his first county championship medal at adult level.

=== Glen Rovers ===
==== Early successes ====
Following an acrimonious dispute with the Cloyne club committee, Ring and his two brothers left the club. Willie John joined Ballinacurra and Paddy Joe joined Russell Rovers, however, Ring remained unattached from a club for over a year. A fortuitous meeting with Jack Lynch in the summer of 1941 led to his Cork teammate inviting Ring to join the Glen Rovers club. Ring accepted the offer and made his debut in a championship semi-final defeat of St. Finbarr's. He was at midfield for the subsequent decider against Ballincollig and gave, what was described in the Cork Examiner as, a masterful display with his midfield partner Connie Buckley. The 4–7 to 2–2 victory stretched the Glen's winning streak to eight successive championships. For Ring it was his first winners' medal.

Nine-in-a-row proved beyond Glen Rovers as Ballincollig exacted their revenge in the semi-final of the 1942 championship. After a season of reorganisation, which saw the introduction of nine new players to the team, Glen Rovers reached the 1944 championship final where they faced reigning champions and three-in-a-row hopefuls St. Finbarr's. Ring was, once again, hugely influential and contributed 0–5 from centre-forward. The 5–7 to 3–3 victory gave him a second championship medal.

Divisional side Carrigdhoun provided the opposition as Glen Rovers reached the 1945 championship final in search of their tenth title. In what was probably the most exciting decider in which the club had been involved in so far, the Glen were five goals ahead after 25 minutes having played with a gale-force wind, however, Carrigdhoun fought back to reduce the arrears and set up an exciting finish. Ring top scored with 0–6 as Glen Rovers retained the championship title following a 4–10 to 5–3 victory.

==== Glen Rovers march on ====
After defeat by St. Finbarr's in the 1946 championship final, Glen Rovers saw a number of changes to the team when they next contested the decider in 1948. Retirement and emigration and forced a number of changes, with Ring once again filling a midfield berth. Ring had a quiet game by his standards as Glen veterans such as Jack Lynch and Johnny Quirke secured the double scores 5–7 to 3–2 victory over roll of honour leaders Blackrock.

Glen Rovers were presented with their chance of retaining their title when they faced divisional side Imokilly in the 1949 championship decider. On a day of incessant rain, the game was described as one of the best of the year. Donie Twomey and Jack Lynch were the stars of the team as they bagged 5–2 between them. Ring scored the Glen's sixth goal of the game and secured his fifth championship medal following the 6–5 to 0–14 victory.

Southside rivals St. Finbarr's were the opponents as Glen Rovers were determined to make it three titles in-a-row in the 1950 championship final. St. Finbarr's had the advantage of a very strong breeze in the first half and mounted attack after attack on the Glen goal but failed to raise the green flag. The Glen backs gave one of the finest displays of defensive hurling ever seen in the championship and kept the southsiders tally for the first half to 0–4. "The Barr's" added just one further point to their tally after the interval. The 2–8 to 0–5 victory secured a third successive championship title for the club and a sixth winners' medal for Ring.

Sarsfields ended the Glen's hopes of four-in-a-row in 1951, while defeat in the first round of 1952 looked like heralding a fallow period. The club returned stronger than ever when they qualified for the 1953 championship final where they faced Sarsfields once again. After a slow start Glen Rovers gave an exhibition of hurling all over the field, with Rings coring 1–2 in the process. The 8–5 to 4–3 victory secured his seventh championship medal.

In 1954 Ring was appointed club captain as Glen Rovers reached their 17th championship final in twenty years. Blackrock fielded a young team, however, Glen Rovers had eight inter-county players on their team. In spite of this, Blackrock stood up to the champions and the result remained in doubt to the end. A 3–7 to 3–2 victory secured an eighth championship medal for Ring, while he also had the honour of lifting the Seán Óg Murphy Cup.

==== Three championships in-a-row ====
Glen Rovers lost the next two championship deciders, while Ring was ruled out of the Glen's 1958 championship triumph after being sent off in the semi-final. In spite of watching the game from the stands he still collected a ninth championship medal having played in the earlier rounds. He was back on the starting fifteen as Glen Rovers faced Blackrock in the 1959 championship final. Once again the game went to the wire and it was Ring who scored the winning goal with four minutes remaining. His tally of 1–6 was vital in securing the 3–11 to 3–5 victory and his own tenth championship medal.

A third successive championship beckoned in 1960 as Glen Rovers faced University College Cork in the championship decider. The game was regarded as one of the most thrill-packed and nerve-shattering games in the history of the championship. With time running out the Glen were behind, however, Ring pointed a free from the sideline to level the game. Johnny Clifford secured the lead when his sideline cut went straight over the bar. He gave the Glen a two-point lead straight from the puck-out when his shot sailed over the bar again. The 3–8 to 1–12 victory gave Ring his eleventh championship medal.

==== Final successes ====
Four-in-a-row once again proved beyond the Glen, however, the team endured a hard-fought campaign in 1962. In the semi-final against Imokilly 41-year-old Ring rolled back the years and scored three goals in the last fifteen minutes to help the team qualify for the final against University College Cork. The Glen led 3–3 to 0–2 at half-time but the college team powered by many inter-county stars fought back and went ahead with a minute to go but Tom Corbett sent over the equaliser with seconds left and secured a 3–7 to 2–10 draw. The replay proved to be even more exciting than the drawn match as Joe Salmon and Ring were singled out as the key figures in the Glen's 3–8 to 2–10 victory. Ring was appointed club captain again in 1964 as Glen Rovers faced St. Finbarr's in the championship final. The Glen were underdogs and looked well beaten in half a dozen vital outfield positions in the opening thirty minutes. All changed in the second half with Ring scoring a vital goal to give the Glen the lead. "The Barr's" battled back, however, at the full-time whistle the Glen were the champions and Ring collected a remarkable thirteenth championship medal and captained the team to victory for the second time. The Glen's success took on extra significance as they became the first club to represent Cork in the newly created Munster Club Championship. After little interest in the opening rounds of the championship and lengthy delays, the Glen qualified to meet Mount Sion in the provincial decider. After the initial game was abandoned, Ring gave an exhibition of his skills in the replay and collected a Munster medal following a 3–7 to 1–7 victory.

In June 1967, Ring scored 1–2 and set up another goal in the Glen's championship quarter-final defeat of University College Cork. While the Glen were scheduled to play Muskerry in the championship semi-final, he announced without warning that he wouldn't be playing. After more than a quarter of a century of club hurling, Ring had retired.

== Inter-county career ==
=== Minor and junior ===
By 1937 Ring's performances as a minor hurler for St. Enda's led to him being considered for the Cork minor hurling panel. He was only sixteen years-old throughout the championship campaign and was not selected for any of the provincial stages or for the All-Ireland semi-final. He was later listed as one of the substitutes for the subsequent All-Ireland final against Kilkenny. He played no part in that game which Cork won by 8–5 to 2–7. As the last substitute Ring shared in the victory but received no All-Ireland medal.

Ring was eligible for the minor grade again the following year and made his debut in a Cork jersey against Limerick on 22 May 1938. Although he would come to be known as a high-scoring forward, his inter-county career began as a defender. He later won a Munster medal following a 9–3 to 0–0 thrashing of Kerry. The subsequent All-Ireland final on 4 September 1938 saw Ring make his first Croke Park appearance. Dublin provided the opposition on that occasion and a tough game of hurling ensued. Ring, in spite of playing in defence, scored a goal from a 21-yard free to help his county to a 7–2 to 5–4 victory. It was his first All-Ireland medal with Cork, in what was his last game in the minor grade.

In 1939 Ring went on to become the youngest member of the Cork junior hurling team. There was no place for him in defence and he was seen as too vital a player to be left out of the starting fifteen, so instead he was moved to the forwards. Cork were fancied to retain their junior crown for a second year, however, Waterford got the better of them in their opening game.

=== Senior career ===
==== Beginnings ====
Ring made his first appearance for the Cork senior team when he was introduced as a substitute in a tournament game against Limerick in early 1939. Later that year on 22 October, he made his first competitive start when Cork played the newly crowned All-Ireland champions Kilkenny in the opening round of the 1939–40 National Hurling League. Ring marked four-time All-Ireland medal winner Paddy Phelan and, after a nervous start, settled into the game and scored a point in the 6–5 to 4–7 victory. Cork progressed through the league and qualified for the final against Tipperary. Ring, who was the youngest player on the Cork team, was named at right wing-forward and was one of the many goal-scorers in a 14-goal thriller. Cork won by 8–9 to 6–4 and he collected his first league medal. Ring retained the position of right wing-forward on Cork's subsequent championship team and made his championship debut on 2 June 1940 in a 6–3 to 2–6 Munster quarter-final defeat of Tipperary.

==== Four-in-a-row ====
Cork were undefeated throughout their 1940–41 league campaign and qualified for a second successive league final. A 4–11 to 2–7 defeat of Dublin gave Ring a second league medal. Cork were well placed going into the subsequent championship and were drawn to play Tipperary in the Munster semi-final. An outbreak of foot-and-mouth disease in Tipperary changed matters and the match was called off the previous Monday by order of the Department of Agriculture. Tipperary, and other counties affected by the disease, wanted officials to put back the All-Ireland final, but Central Council would not agree. The council ruled that teams be nominated and if a nominated team won the All-Ireland that team would be awarded the 1941 championship. The Munster Council decided that Cork and Limerick should play off for the right to represent the province in the All-Ireland final. It was also agreed that the winners would play Tipperary later in the Munster final. Limerick had already qualified for the final as a result of victory over Clare. Cork easily accounted for Limerick, who were without Mick and John Mackey, by 8–10 to 2–3 and qualified for the All-Ireland final on 28 September 1941. Dublin, who were nominated by the Leinster Council, to represent the province provided little resistance. Johnny Quirke opened the goal-scoring for Cork before Ted O'Sullivan netted a second. Further goals by Quirke, O'Sullivan and Mick Brennan in the second half secured a 5–11 to 0–6 victory. It was one of the most one-sided championship deciders of all time, however, it did give Ring his very first All-Ireland medal at senior level. On 26 October 1941, Cork faced Tipperary in the delayed Munster final. The exertion of winning the All-Ireland had taken its toll on some of the Cork players who took a less than serious attitude to the game. Some players were accused of even being drunk during the match. Consequently, Cork were defeated by 5–4 to 2–5, thus creating the anomaly of being All-Ireland champions but Munster runners-up.

Losing the Munster decider tainted Ring's view of the worth of the All-Ireland title, however, in 1942 Cork were given the opportunity to reverse the defeat when they qualified to meet Tipperary in the provincial final again. The game was played on an even keel for 45 minutes, however, a more youthful Cork side pulled away in the final quarter to win by 4–15 to 4–1. The victory gave Ring, who scored 0–5, his first Munster medal. Cork subsequently qualified to face Dublin in the All-Ireland final on 6 September 1942. The match was much more evenly contested than the corresponding fixture the previous year, with Ring scoring 0–3 in the opening exchanges. In spite of losing goalkeeper Ned Porter to an injury, Cork finished the stronger and a Derry Beckett goal at the end put the result beyond doubt. The 2–4 to 3–4 victory gave Ring his second successive All-Ireland medal.

Ring was instrumental in helping Cork to retain the Munster title in 1943. His contribution of 1–3 in a close game was vital in helping Cork to a 2–13 to 3–8 defeat of a Waterford team appearing in their first provincial decider in nine years. Antrim, having already pulled off two of the biggest shocks in the history of the championship by defeating Galway and Kilkenny, were Cork's opponents in the All-Ireland final on 5 September 1943. The game was a poor spectacle as Cork routed their opponents by 5–16 to 0–4. Goals from Johnny Quirke (two), Ted O'Sullivan, Mick Brennan and Mick Kennefick helped secure a third successive All-Ireland winners' medal for Ring.

An unprecedented fourth successive All-Ireland was within Cork's reach in 1944, however, Cork were nearly beaten by Limerick in the Munster final. After leading by nine points at one stage on the second half, a Limerick resurgence was spearheaded by the Mackey brothers, Dick Stokes, Paddy McCarthy and Dave Clohessy. Limerick had a two-point lead as the game drew to a close, however, Johnny Quirke scored his third goal in what looked like the winning score. Dick Stokes pointed from a free in the last minute to draw the game. The replay created enormous excitement with thousands making their way to Thurles in spite of wartime petrol rationing. With seven minutes left in the match it looked as if Cork's great run of success was at an end. Trailing by four points, Mick Mackey burst through for his second goal, however, play was called back for a foul on him. Limerick missed the resulting free. Cork nicked a goal and a point to equalise. With a minute left, Mackey's effort for a winning point went wide. Seconds later, Ring picked up the sliotar in his own half and set off upfield, slipped past a series of challenges and, from 40 yards out, crashed the ball to the net for the winning goal. Ring's last-minute goal secured a 4–6 to 3–6 victory and a third successive Munster medal. Many regard this passage of play as the moment that the mantle of hurling's star player passed from Mick Mackey to Ring. Once again Cork went on to face Dublin in the All-Ireland final on 3 September 1944. Cork looked sluggish and failed to score for the opening ten minutes, however, they held an 0–8 to 0–2 half-time advantage. Joe Kelly was the star forward as his 2–3 was instrumental in Cork securing a 2–13 to 1–2 victory. It was a victory which set Cork apart from all their predecessors as they became the first team to win four successive All-Ireland titles. On a personal level for Ring, he became the holder of four All-Ireland winners' medals before his 24th birthday.

==== Fifth All-Ireland medal and defeat ====
Cork's hopes of extending their unbeaten run to five successive All-Ireland championships ended with a 2–13 to 3–2 defeat to Tipperary in the 1945 Munster semi-final. Ring was, rather surprisingly, subdued and outplayed for the hour by Tommy Purcell.

Ring was appointed captain of the Cork team in 1946, a year which saw him become the key player on the team. After the shock defeat the previous year, Cork qualified for the Munster final. An ageing Limerick team provided the opposition, however, in a disappointing game Cork had an easy victory by 3–8 to 1–3. Ring top scored with 0–5 as he collected his fourth Munster medal. A subsequent defeat of Galway allowed Cork to advance to an All-Ireland final meeting with Kilkenny on 1 September 1946. Gerry O'Riordan scored Cork's first goal as the first half drew to a close before Ring scored one of the most iconic goals of his career. Catching a clearance from Paddy O'Donovan on the half-way line, Ring took off on a solo-run at speed and dodged several Kilkenny defenders. After reaching the 21-yard line he let off a shoulder-high shot which flew straight to the net. Cork scored five more goals after the interval as they powered to a 7–5 to 3–8 victory. The victory secured a fifth All-Ireland medal in six seasons for Ring, while he also had the honour of collecting the Liam MacCarthy Cup on behalf of the team.

Cork continued their provincial dominance in 1947. A 2–6 to 2–3 defeat of Limerick in the provincial decider gave Ring a fifth Munster medal. For the second year in succession, Cork qualified to play Kilkenny in the All-Ireland final on 7 September 1947. In what is often regarded as the greatest final of all time, Ring was held to just a single point. Mossy O'Riordan and Joe Kelly scored two goals to almost win the game for Cork, however, Kilkenny rallied with Terry Leahy and Jim Langton leading the charge. Leahy secured the equalising point before scoring one of the greatest match-winners ever. Having gathered the sliotar from a long clearance by right corner-back Paddy Grace, he struck from around 50 yards out and not far inside the Cusack Stand sideline. Immediately after the puck out the game ended and Kilkenny had won by 0–14 to 2–7. In spite of the All-Ireland defeat, Ring ended the year as the championship's top scorer.

==== Fallow period ====
Cork qualified for their ninth Munster final in ten seasons in 1948, with Waterford providing the opposition. Many expected an easy Cork victory, however, the Waterford team held a narrow 2–3 to 1–5 half-time advantage. Ring contributed 1–4 over the hour, however, his last-gasp shot to draw the match after a 30-yards solo-run tailed off and went wide. The match ended with the resultant puck-out and Cork were defeated by 4–7 to 3–9.

In 1949 Ring endured the most torrid 150 minutes of championship hurling as Cork faced Tipperary in the Munster quarter-final. Tipperary had a relatively young and inexperienced team, however, for most of the match it looked as if youth would trump experience and with only a few minutes to spare they were ahead by 3–10 to 2–9. A solo effort from Jack Lynch, who by know was a TD, from his usual midfield berth resulted in a goal and brought his personal tally to 1–6. A point from Bernie Murphy levelled the scores at the death. The replay four weeks later was a classic. A Gerry O'Riordan goal gave Cork a 1–2 to 0–2 at the interval, however, Cork could have been further ahead but for a disallowed goal. Mossy O'Riordan sent a shot past Tipperary 'keeper Tony Reddin, however, the sliotar appeared to rebound off the stanchion supporting the net before being cleared. In spite of Ring protesting with the officials, the referee waved the play on. After five minutes of injury time Cork still led by 1–5 to 0–5, however, Jimmy Kennedy scored the equalising goal and the game headed for extra-time. Both sides took different approaches as extra-time was about to be played. Tipperary retired to their dressing room where the players refreshed themselves with a creamery churn full of cold water. Cork on the other hand remained out on the field in what was one of the warmest days ever recorded in Ireland. Tipperary took to the field a much fresher team and an early goal from Mick Ryan gave them the lead and they held out to win by 2–8 to 1–9. Tipp's Tommy Doyle, who earlier in the year ad been coaxed out of retirement, gave an inspired display by holding Ring scoreless for the two drawn games and the period of extra time. In spite of an early championship exit, Ring was chosen at centre-forward on the Sunday Press Team of the Year.

Ring was appointed captain of the Cork team for 1950 and there was an inevitability about the meeting of Cork and Tipperary in the Munster final. The official attendance at Fitzgerald Stadium was given as 39,000, however, up to 50,000 saw the game as gates were broken down, walls were scaled at the pitch invaded with supporters. There were supporters on the pitch at the throw-in, while a Cork fan tried to strike Tipperary's Seán Kenny. Despite the raucous nature of the crowd, the Tipperary and Cork players managed to produce a classic game of hurling. A Paddy Kenny goal helped Tipperary into a 1–13 to 1–6 half-time lead. The start of the second half was delayed by yet another pitch invasion, and when it finally got under way, Ring dragged his team back into the contest by slaloming through the Tipperary defence and rifling the ball the sliotar to the net. As the match drifted away from their team the Cork fans grew more and more frustrated, and when a Jimmy Kennedy point put Tipperary 2–17 to 2–9 ahead with just ten minutes remaining, hundreds invaded the pitch from behind Tony Reddin's goal and forced referee Liam O'Donoghue to call a halt to the match. The goalkeeper had oranges and overcoats thrown at him as he carried out his duties and on one occasion a supporter held him by the jersey as he went to clear the sliotar. Every Cork score was greeted by a pitch invasion, while pleas from Jack Lynch and Ring failed to quell them. Tipperary eventually won the game by 2–17 to 3–11.

Both Cork and Tipperary faced each other once again in the 1951 Munster final. At half time Tipperary led by 0–9 to 1–4, however, the restart saw Cork up the ante. Ring gave an absolute exhibition of scoring, collecting possession, beating tackles and setting up attacks. Tipperary, however, never faltered in the wake of Ring's roaming presence. Playing out the final stages of the match in his bare feet Ring converted two more frees, however, Tipperary held on to win by 2–11 to 2–9.

==== Three-in-a-row ====
In 1952 Tipperary were presented with the possibility of equalling Cork's record of four successive All-Ireland titles. When both sides met in that year's Munster final, Tipperary looked the likely winners as Cork failed to score for the opening quarter. Trailing by 2–5 to 0–5 at the break, Ring gave an inspirational display in the second half. After being denied twice by Tipperary goalkeeper Tony Reddin, he set up Liam Dowling for a vital goal to leave Cork just a point in arrears. As the umpire was slow to raise the green flag to signal the goal, Ring ran in and waved it himself to the delight of the Cork supporters. Cork held out for the lead and won the game by 1–11 to 2–6. For the first time in eight years, Cork subsequently faced Dublin in the All-Ireland final on 7 September 1952. The Christy Ring-Des Ferguson duel was a highlight of the game, as Cork took a narrow 1–5 to 0–5 half-time lead after a Liam Dowling goal. Cork took complete control after the interval, with Dowling netting a second goal and Ring adding four points to the two he already scored in the first half. A 2–14 to 0–7 victory gave him his sixth All-Ireland medal. At the end of the year Ring was runner-up to Cavan Gaelic footballer Mick Higgins when the Gaelic Sportsman invited its readers to select the Sportsman of the Year.

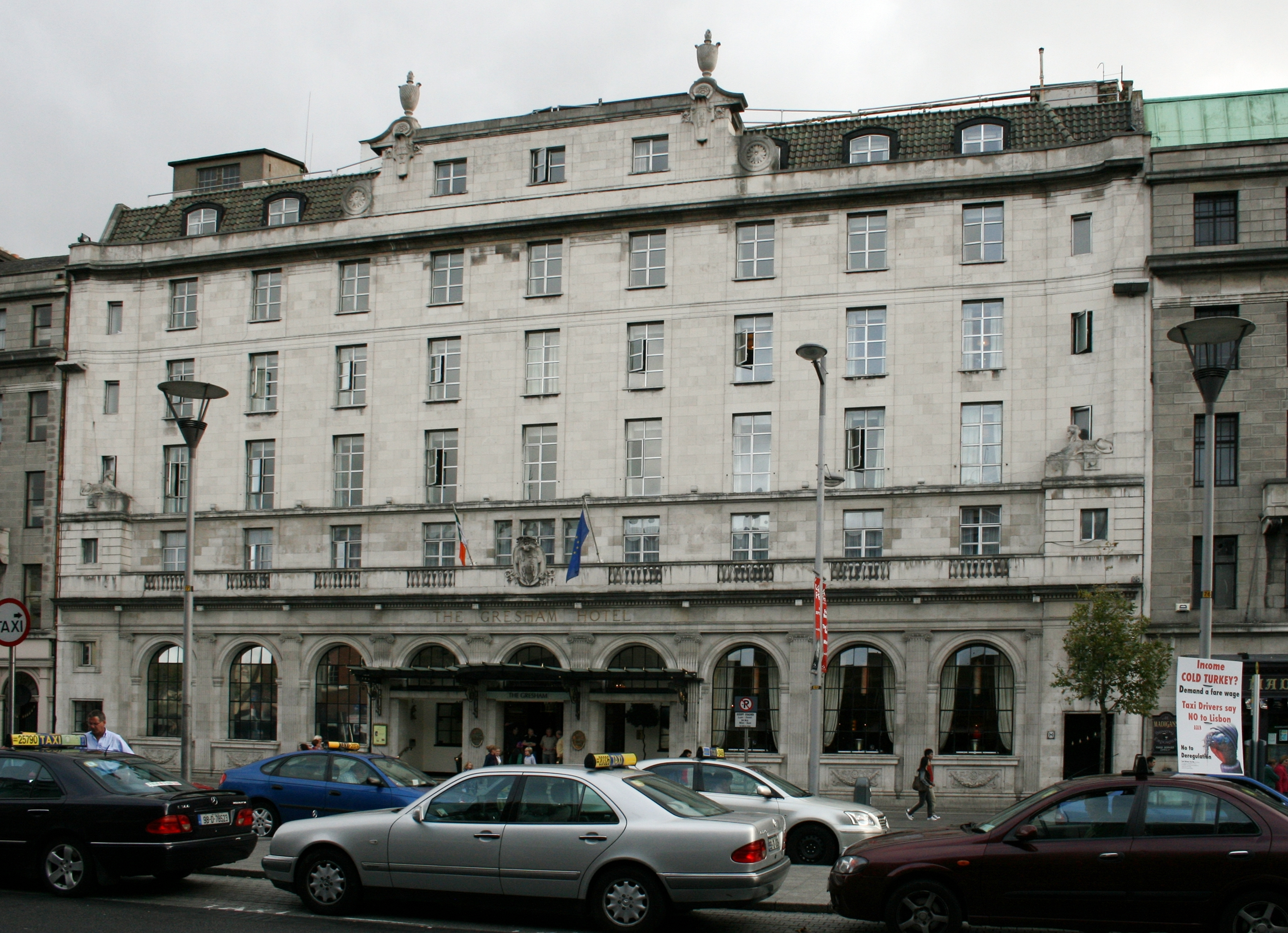
The Gresham Hotel was the scene of an assault on Ring after the 1953 All-Ireland final.

Cork and Tipperary renewed their rivalry in 1953, when a record crowd of over 38,000 saw them contest the final of the league. Paddy Barry and Jimmy Lynam gave Cork a comfortable lead after scoring two goals as Tipperary missed several scoring chances. Paddy Kennedy responded with two goals at the end to narrow Cork's margin of victory to 2–10 to 2–7. It was Ring's fourth league medal overall. For the subsequent championship campaign, county champions Avondhu had the right to the captaincy of the Cork team. In an unprecedented but popular move, the North Cork division named Ring as captain. Having already met in the league decider, Cork and Tipperary qualified to meet in the Munster final as well. In one of the greatest games of his career, Ring had the sliotar in the Tipperary net from a 25-yards free after just a minute of play. He added eight further points, while also making a remarkable goal-line save to secure a 3–10 to 1–11 victory. For the second time in his career as captain, Ring collected the Munster Cup while he also won his seventh Munster medal. This victory qualified Cork for the All-Ireland final, however, between the two deciders Ring's mother died. Her death had such a devastating effect on him that it seemed likely that he would miss the All-Ireland final. After much agonising and encouragement from family members, Ring rejoined the Cork team for training and was at left wing-forward for the game against Galway. After a slow start, which allowed Galway take an early lead, Cork regrouped and were 2–1 to 0–3 ahead at half-time after goals from Josie Hartnett and Ring. Galway remained close to Cork throughout the second half, however, a third goal from Tom O'Sullivan put the result beyond doubt and secured a 3–3 to 0–8 victory for Cork. As captain, Ring collected the Liam MacCarthy Cup for the second time in his career, while he also won a record seventh All-Ireland medal. In spite of victory, the game remained controversial over the alleged hitting of Galway captain Mickey Burke by Ring during the second half. There were ugly scenes at the post-match reception at the Gresham Hotel when an unknown Galway player struck Ring in retaliation as he was leaving the ballroom. To compound matters, both sets of players were staying in Barry's Hotel. At breakfast the following morning Ring was punched in the face by another Galway player who then made a quick escape. Several more Galway players gathered across the road from the hotel and more fighting was expected, however, they were dispersed and Cork left Dublin for their homecoming celebrations. At the end of the year Ring once again finished runner-up in the Gaelic Sportsman Sportsman of the Year.

Ring remained as Cork captain for 1954, as he attempted to make history by becoming the first player to win eight All-Ireland medals. The Munster final saw Cork face Tipperary for the sixth consecutive season. Tipperary looked likely winners for much of the match, however, a Ring shot from 20 yards was saved by goalkeeper Tony Reddin before falling to the waiting Paddy Barry who clinched the winning goal. The 2–8 to 1–8 victory gave Ring his eighth Munster medal and his third victory as captain. After overcoming Galway in the semi-final, Cork faced Wexford in the All-Ireland final on 5 September 1954. It was their first championship meeting in over fifty years. A record crowd of 84,856 saw the sides on level terms after the first quarter. A scramble after a sideline ball resulted in a Wexford goal by Tom Ryan after 26 minutes which gave them a 1–3 to 0–5 lead. With a strong breeze in their favour in the second half, Cork looked in a very strong position. Nicky Rackard had switched from full-forward to centre-forward to curb the long clearances of Vincy Twomey. By the tenth minute points from Tim Flood and Paddy Kehoe had Wexford 1–6 to 0–5 ahead. Then a goal-bound Ring shot struck Nick O'Donnell, breaking his collarbone. Further points cut the Cork deficit to two and with four minutes left young Johnny Clifford trapped the ball on the end line, dribbled it along the ground and shot past Art Foley from a narrow angle. Injury-time points from Hartnett and Ring gave Cork a 1–9 to 1–6 victory and secured the elusive eighth All-Ireland medal. He also became the first captain to receive the Liam MacCarthy Cup on three occasions.

==== Last All-Ireland final ====
Four-in-a-row proved beyond Cork as they were shocked by a Jimmy Smyth-inspired Clare in the 1955 Munster quarter-final. The defeat sparked several retirements and an influx of some new players to the Cork team which qualified to play reigning champions Limerick in the 1956 Munster final. With a quarter of the match remaining, Limerick were six points ahead, while Donal Broderick had prevented Ring from making any significant contribution. With time running out Ring took a pass from Josie Hartnett, fought his way through two defenders and, from a kneeling position, palmed the sliotar to the net. A minute later he netted his second goal after a solo-run down the left wing. After a Vivian Cobbe point steadied Limerick, Ring netted his third goal for a 5–5 to 3–5 victory and he won a ninth winners' medal. For the second time in three years, Cork faced Wexford in the All-Ireland final on 23 September 1956. The game reached a climax in the closing stages as Cork were two points down and Ring tried to salvage a victory. The sliotar broke to Ring after a 70-yards free and he headed straight for goal with the Wexford back line in pursuit. When he got to the 21-yard line he let off a shot that was set to rattle the back of the net, but the shot was somehow blocked by Wexford 'keeper Art Foley and then cleared by him too. Ring remarked in an interview many years later; "When I got through I thought I had it, but Foley had other ideas, and fair play to him he made a great save." After the sliotar had been cleared Ring raced in and grabbed Foley by the hair and said "You little black bastard you've beaten us". Foley replied "It's about so and so time someone did" before both men shook hands and Ring congratulated him on his save. Within a minute the ball dropped into Foley again and after it was cleared it made its way up the pitch and was buried in the back of the Cork net by Nicky Rackard giving Wexford a 2–14 to 2–8 victory. With seconds remaining in the final and Wexford holding onto a two-point lead, In what was only his second All-Ireland final defeat, Ring was denied his ninth All-Ireland medal. In the moments after the final whistle Nick O'Donnell, Bobby Rackard and Art Foley raised Ring onto their shoulders and carried him off the field in what was an unparalleled display of sportsmanship in any game, raised Ring onto their shoulders and carried him off the field. Towards the end of the year, Ring was chosen as the number one hurler of the year in the Gaelic Echo.

==== Twilight years ====
Following defeat in the 1956 All-Ireland final, it was expected by many that Ring, who was now thirty-six years-old, would retire from inter-county hurling. No such announcement came and he was included on Cork's championship fifteen again for 1957. In the Munster semi-final victory over Tipperary, he suffered a broken wrist which ruled him out of the subsequent Munster final. Cork lost that game to an up-and-coming Waterford side by 1–11 to 1–6.

In 1958 Ring was named at full-forward on the Best Hurling Team of the Year in the Sunday Review, however, Cork exited the championship at the hands of Tipperary in the Munster semi-final. In 1959 Cork qualified to play Waterford in the Munster final. Ring contributed 1–5, including a late goal which looked like turning the game in Cork's favour, however, Waterford held out for a 3–9 to 2–9 victory. In spite of a lack of championship success, Ring finished the year by being named Caltex Hurler of the Year. He remains the oldest player ever to win the award.

Ring finished the 1959–60 league as top scorer, including 3–4 in Cork's league final defeat by Tipperary. Both sides renewed their rivalry in the subsequent Munster final. Described as the toughest game of hurling ever played, Cork enjoyed most of the possession in the first half, however, Tipperary led by a goal at the interval thanks to the accuracy of Jimmy Doyle. They stretched their lead to five points in the final quarter, however, a last-minute Cork goal left the result in doubt once again. Tipperary eventually won a gruelling contest by 4–13 to 4–11.

1961 followed a similar pattern to the year before. Ring was once again the top scorer for the 1960–61 season and, once again, Cork and Tipperary lined out against each other in the Munster final. An official attendance of 62,175 was the biggest ever recorded at a Cork-Tipperary match, or at any Irish sporting event outside of Croke Park. The real attendance may have been as high as 70,000 as the gates were thrown open halfway through the preceding minor game. Cork's preparations were undermined by the large crowd. After togging off in the Railway Hotel in Limerick city centre, they had intended to travel by cars to the venue. The volume of bodies on the Ennis Road meant that the players had to abandon their cars and physically jostle their way through the crowd to make the throw-in time. At half-time Tipperary were out of sight by 3–3 to 0–1. The game ended on a sour note when Ring and John Doyle became involved in a punch-up while Tom Moloughney was knocked to the ground, allegedly after being struck by Ring. Tipperary won the game by 3–6 to 0–7, however, Ring was wrongly named in some national newspapers as having hit both Doyle and Moloughney. The National Union of Journalists later issued an apology to him.

After a good showing in the group stage, Cork qualified for a league final meeting with Kilkenny in 1962. Cork looked like they were in for a hefty defeat, however, a Ring goal gave Cork the lead against the run of play. Kilkenny regrouped and eventually secured a 1–8 to 1–6 victory in what was Ring's last appearance at Croke Park for Cork. The subsequent Munster championship saw Ring lose out to Waterford at the semi-final stage. It would be his last championship game for Cork.

Ring played a tournament game against Waterford in June 1963 and was again later picked for Cork's championship fifteen. On the day of the Munster quarter-final against Clare, it was announced that Ring would not be playing. Cork won by 4–15 to 2–11 and he was again included as a non-playing substitute for Cork's subsequent Munster semi-final defeat by Tipperary.

In 1964 the Cork selectors considered bringing Ring back onto the team. He was picked at corner-forward for a tournament game in Cobh in May 1964, however, he didn't line out on the day. In spite of this there was speculation that he would be listed on Cork's championship panel. John Lyons and Jim Hurley had voted for his return, however, the other three selectors had the majority in leaving him off the panel. After 25 years Ring was effectively dropped and the curtain was brought down on his inter-county career.

==== Possible comeback ====
After Ring's omission from the Cork team in 1964, there was little talk about a possible return the following year and it came to be accepted that Ring had retired. By 1966 his name was being mentioned again as a number of factors contributed to a possible recall to the Cork team. John Doyle of Tipperary had won his eighth All-Ireland medal the previous year, thereby equalling Ring's seemingly unique record. Similarly, his displays at club level showed that he even at 45 years-of-age he was still the best forward in the county. As Cork defeated Clare and Limerick to qualify for the Munster final, there was intense speculation once again that he would be recalled to the team. Ring let it be known that he was available, however, when the selectors announced the team he was listed as a substitute and not on the starting fifteen. While the decision to recall him was not a unanimous one amongst the selectors, the prospect of winning another Munster medal and a record ninth All-Ireland medal as a substitute to another player did not appeal to Ring and he declined to be listed on the panel. This decision finally ended all of the speculation that he would make a dramatic comeback at some stage.

== Inter-provincial career ==
=== Early successes ===
Ring was first chosen for the Munster team in 1941. He was an unused substitute in the Railway Cup final, as Munster faced a narrow 2–5 to 2–4 defeat by Leinster. The following year Ring was at centre-forward as Munster received a buy to the final where they faced Leinster once again. In a reversal of the previous year, Munster claimed a 4–9 to 4–5 victory, with Ring winning his very first Railway Cup medal.

In 1943 the midfield pairing on the Munster team was an all-Glen Rovers and all-Cork affair as Ring was partnered by Jack Lynch. The game was a close affair, however, Ring collected a second winners' medal as Munster triumphed by 4–3 to 3–5. He was moved back to his more usual centre-forward position the following year, as Munster made it three-in-a-row following a 4–10 to 4–4 defeat of first-time finalists Connacht. Ring retained the centre-forward berth on the 1945 Munster team that faced debutantes Ulster in the final. A huge 8–8 to 2–0 victory resulted in Munster claiming a record-equalling fourth successive Railway Cup.

Ring was partnered by his Glen Rovers colleague Jim Young in the half-forward line as Munster received a buy to the 1946 Railway Cup final. A Connacht team composed of all Galway players looked to be heading for a first victory, but Munster clawed their way back to level the game with time running out. Ring was the hero of the game for Munster, as his point from a sideline ball from 60 yards at the stroke of full-time secured a 3–12 to 4–8 victory. It was a record-breaking fifth title in succession for Munster and a fifth winners' medal for Ring. Six-in-a-row proved beyond Munster in 1947, as an all-Galway Connacht side secured an historic 2–5 to 1–1 victory.

=== A record six-in-a-row ===
Cork players made up one third of the Munster team in 1948 as the southern province faced Leinster in the decider. Ring was moved to the left wing-forward position where he made a number of spectacular solo-runs, one of which resulted in a pass to Ned Daly for the equalising point just before half-time. Vin Baston scored the winning goal shortly before the end, as Munster won by 3–5 to 2–5. It was Ring's sixth Railway Cup medal.

Munster finished the decade by qualifying for their ninth successive Railway Cup final in 1949. Ring was the star player as Connacht provided the opposition and he secured Munster's opening goal when his sideline ball slipped through goalkeeper Seánie Duggans fingers and trickled over the line. He netted a second goal after the interval when he doubled on a flying ball from 30 yards out. The 5–3 to 2–9 victory secured a seventh winners' medal for Ring.

The 1950 Railway Cup final saw Munster and Leinster renew their hurling rivalry. Ring was once again included on the Munster team, however, high winds, a large number of wides and a poor level of skill contributed to a drab and disjointed game. A 0–9 to 1–3 victory sealed an eighth Railway Cup medal for Ring.

Ring was moved to left corner-forward on the Munster team that faced Leinster in the 1951 Railway Cup final. He gave an exhibition of hurling and was vital to several Munster scores. His 1–1 in the closing stages sealed a 4–9 to 3–6 victory and a ninth Railway Cup medal.

In 1952 Munster qualified to meet Connacht in the Railway Cup decider, while Ring was on the brink of collecting a remarkable tenth winners' medal. He was once again at his devastating best and scored 1–3 in the first half, before adding a second goal after the break. A 5–11 to 4–2 victory gave Ring a tenth Railway Cup medal.

Ring was appointed captain of the Munster team in 1953 as the southern province qualified to play Leinster in the final. Ring was well marked by Jim Hogan and Jimmy Heffernan, however, he evaded them on several occasions to score some trademark points from tight angles. He set up Matt Nugent and Séamus Bannon for two goals, as Munster claimed a 5–7 to 5–5 victory. It was a record-breaking sixth successive title for Munster. Not only did Ring claim an eleventh Railway Cup medal but he also had the honour of accepting the cup as captain. Munster failed to add to their great run of success in 1954. Ring was once again well marshalled by Jim Hogan as a 0–9 to 0–5 victory gave Leinster their first Railway Cup title since 1941.

=== Continued dominance ===
In 1955 Ring resumed the captaincy as Munster qualified to play Connacht in the final. He was the key player for the southern province and scored a remarkable goal when he cupped the sliotar to the net after falling. He added three more points before Josie Hartentt scored the decisive goal in the 6–8 to 3–4 victory. After accepting the cup for the second time as captain, Ring later claimed his twelfth Railway Cup medal. Munster endured a heavy defeat at the hands of Leinster in the 1956 decider. After trailing by 3–5 to 0–2 after twenty-five minutes, Munster eventually lost by 5–11 to 1–7.

After defeat in 1956, Ring set out to atone by giving a masterful display against Leinster in the 1957 Railway Cup final. His tally of 3–5 was enough to beat the eastern province on his own. His first goal came after he grabbed the sliotar some 40 yards out and drove it past Art Foley. His second was a ground snap shot, while his third goal was a cut which he took on the turn after Foley lost the sliotar. The 5–7 to 2–5 victory gave Ring his thirteenth Railway Cup medal.

Munster and Leinster met for the third successive year in the 1958 Railway Cup final. Munster were underdogs going into the game, while Ring was well marked by Nick O'Donnell. He had a number of sharp shots at goal, however, the outstanding goalkeeping of Ollie Walsh prevented him from scoring. After a quiet game by his own standards, Ring won his fourteenth Railway Cup medal after a 3–7 to 3–5 victory.

In spite of his advancing age, Ring was chosen on the Munster team that qualified to play Connacht in the 1959 Railway Cup final. The occasion was a special one as the game marked the official opening of the new Hogan Stand. Ring rose to the occasion by giving a mercurial performance which saw him score 4–5. The 7–11 to 2–6 victory gave him a fifteenth Railway Cup medal.

=== Final years ===
Ring won 18 Railway Cup medals between 1941 and 1963.

As Ring approached his 40th birthday, he was included on the Munster team for the 20th time in 1960 as Leinster provided the opposition in the final. Ring had a quiet game as he struggled with a hand injury. In spite of this, he chipped in with two points in the 6–6 to 2–7 victory. It was his sixteenth Railway Cup medal.

Ring reached a remarkable milestone in 1961 when his inclusion on the Munster team marked his twentieth year of inter-provincial hurling. Old rivals Leinster provided the opposition in the final, however, for the first time Ring failed to carve out a match-winning performance. Two points from frees was his contribution before retiring with a leg injury in the 25th minute of the first half. Jimmy Doyle did the scoring damage with 2–6 as Munster made it five-in-a-row with a 4–12 to 3–9 victory.

An unprecedented sixth successive title proved beyond Munster in 1962, however, Munster and Leinster faced each other in a fourth successive Railway Cup final in 1963. Ring scored 1–1 as Munster looked the likely winners, however, Leinster rallied to secure a 5–5 apiece draw. The replay was a thrilling affair, however, a rain-soaked pitch impacted on the standard of the hurling. Ring had a disappointing game and was forced to retire through injury after fifteen minutes. Jimmy Smyth secured the winning point as Munster triumphed by 2–8 to 2–7. It was Ring's eighteenth Railway Cup medal, while it also marked his last appearance for Munster.

== Coaching career ==
=== Farranferris ===
St. Finbarr's College, Farranferris.

In 1963 Ring took a mentoring role with the St. Finbarr's College, Farranferris senior team. He had earlier been involved as a referee and as an unofficial adviser to various students, however, now he was included as a key member of the coaching team. That year St. Finbarr's faced Ennis CBS as they qualified for their first Dr. Harty Cup final since 1952. Seánie Barry was the chief scorer and bagged 3–5 as "Farna" claimed the Munster title following a 4–9 to 4–3 victory. On 5 May 1963, St. Finbarr's College faced Patrician College from Ballyfin in the All-Ireland decider. Having trailed for three-quarters of the game, St. Finabrr's rallied in the closing stages thanks to 2–4 from the stick of Seánie Barry. The 4–8 to 3–4 victory was their first All-Ireland title.

After a number of disappointing seasons, Ring was still a mentor when St. Finbarr's College qualified for the 1969 Harty Cup final. Holders Coláiste Chríost Rí provided the opposition in an all-Cork derby. Donie Collins and Tim Crowley were the key players as St. Finbarr's College claimed their second Munster title after a 6–11 to 2–7 victory. St. Kieran's College provided the opposition in the subsequent All-Ireland final on 27 April 1969. Frank O'Brien had the game of his life and scored 4–2 as St. Kieran's were unable to cope with the strong "Farna" challenge. The 5–15 to 2–1 victory gave St. Finbarr's College their second All-Ireland title.

=== Glen Rovers ===
In 1972 Ring was a selector with the Glen Rovers senior team that, after a series of upsets in the earlier rounds, qualified for the championship decider against Youghal. The Glen were the hot favourites, however, they trailed by 1–8 to 12 at the interval. Youghal still held the upper hand at the three-quarter stage, however, Patsy Harte netted his second goal to steady the Glen team. Tom Buckley scored a third as Glen Rovers eventually triumphed by 3–15 to 1–10. A subsequent 2–9 to 1–10 defeat of Roscrea secured the Munster title. Glen Rovers later qualified to play St. Rynagh's in the All-Ireland final, however, after the Offaly and Leinster champions' request for a postponement was denied, Glen Rovers were declared champions by committee. The club, however, preferred to contest the game and win it on the field of play. Only a few hundred spectators turned out at Croke Park to witness a game that lacked any entertainment value. Goalkeeper Finbarr O'Neill saved Glen Rovers on a number of occasions and the Cork team had a 1–10 to 1–3 lead at the interval. St. Rynaghs' six first-half wides did not help the situation. Glen Rovers stretched their lead to eleven points just after the restart. Basil Johnson got a goal for St. Rynagh's, however, it was too little too late as Glen Rovers won by 2–18 to 2–8. The victory gave Ring an All-Ireland club victory as a selector.

After defeats at the hands of Blackrock in 1973 and 1975, the Glen qualified for yet another championship decider in 1976. Blackrock were the opponents once again, however, Ring had been planning for this game since the previous year's defeat. Glen veteran Patsy Harte rolled back to years to score a vital 2–2 as Glen Rovers secured their 24th championship after a 2–7 to 0–10 victory. The subsequent Munster decider against South Liberties was a tough affair, with no less than three players being sent off. A 2–8 to 2–4 secured a third Munster title in all for Glen Rovers. Ring's side subsequently qualified for the All-Ireland final meeting with Camross on 27 March 1977. The Glen, with nine survivors from their previous victory in 1973, were the hot favourites for the title. Camross, which featured eight members of the Cuddy family, held the Glen in the first half. Glen Rovers powered on after the interval to secure an easy 2–12 to 0–8 victory. For Ring, it was the second All-Ireland title as a selector.

=== Cork ===
Ring was first included on the Cork senior hurling team selection committee during the 1972–73 season. Disappointing league and championship campaigns followed for Cork and he was dropped from the selection committee after just one year.

In September 1975 Ring was reappointed to the selection committee. Success was immediate as Cork secured their third successive Oireachtas Cup in October following a 3–13 to 2–7 defeat of Wexford. Cork annexed the Munster title in 1976 following a 3–15 to 4–5 defeat of Limerick before facing Wexford in the All-Ireland final on 5 September 1976. Wexford got off to a great start and were 2–2 to no score ahead after just six minutes. Wexford had a two-point lead with ten minutes to go, however, Ring, as selector, made a tactical switch which won the game. Mick Jacob had been Wexford's most consistent defender at centre-back, however, Ring moved Jimmy Barry-Murphy to centre-forward and he was much fresher than the tiring Jacob. Barry-Murphy picked off two quick points before two from Pat Moylan and a kicked effort from Ray Cummins gave Cork a 2–21 to 4–11 victory. It was Ring's first All-Ireland victory as selector.

Cork faced Clare in the provincial decider in 1977, on a day when armed robbers made away with the takings from the gate of £24,579 during the second half of the game. Clare conceded an early penalty but they fought back to take the lead until a contentious red card for full back Jim Power turned the tide for Cork and they fought on to win by 4–15 to 4–10. The subsequent All-Ireland final on 4 September 1977 was a repeat of the previous year, with Wexford providing the opposition once again. Prior to the game the Cork captain and full-back, Martin O'Doherty, had expressed his concerns over marking Wexford sharp-shooter Tony Doran. Ring advised O'Doherty to play as if he were the full-forward and to get to the ball first in a move which saw the position of full-back in a new role. O'Doherty finished the year as the All-Star full-back. Ring was also instrumental in moving Gerald McCarthy to centre-forward where he was charged with negating the influence of Tony Doran as Jimmy Barry-Murphy had done the year before. Seánie O'Leary, who broke his nose in the pre-match warm-up, scored the decisive goal for Cork as the game entered the last quarter, while Martin Coleman brought off a match-winning save from Christy Keogh to foil the Wexford comeback. A 1–17 to 3–8 victory gave Ring his second All-Ireland as a selector.

Cork secured the provincial title again in 1978 following a narrow 0–13 to 0–11 defeat of Clare. This victory paved the way for an All-Ireland final showdown with Kilkenny on 3 September 1978. Ring had the utmost confidence that Cork would win as he considered that Kilkenny team to be one of the poorest he had ever seen. Cork secured the All-Ireland title as a Jimmy Barry-Murphy goal helped the team to a 1–15 to 2–8 victory. It was a third successive All-Ireland title, the first time since Ring's own playing days that a team had secured a championship hat-trick. The All-Ireland final victory was his last visit to Croke Park.

== Death ==
As long as young men will match their hurling skills against each other on Ireland's green fields, as long as young boys swing their camáns for the sheer thrill of the feel and the tingle in their fingers of the impact of ash on leather, as long as hurling is played the story of Christy Ring will be told. And that will be forever.
As long as the red jerseys of Cork, the blue of Munster and the green, black and gold of Glen Rovers – colours that Christy wore with such distinction – as long as we see these colours in manly combat, the memory of Christy's genius and prowess will come tumbling back in profusion.

— Jack Lynch

Although Ring was in his late fifties, there were no signs that he was in ill health. A non-smoker and non-drinker throughout his entire life, he remained active by regularly playing squash, something he did just two days before his death.

On Friday 2 March 1979, Ring had a scheduled appointment with his doctor and former teammate Dr. Jim Young in Cork city centre. As he was walking past the Cork College of Commerce on Morrisson's Island at 3:30 pm he suffered a massive heart attack and collapsed. He was taken by ambulance to the South Infirmary Hospital but was pronounced dead on arrival. He was 58 years old.

The news of his death came as a great shock to the people of Ireland, and particularly to the people of Cork. His funeral was one of the biggest ever seen in Cork with up to 60,000 people lining the streets. It was also a remarkable hurling occasion with many of Ring's former Munster and All-Ireland foes in attendance. Farrenferris pupils formed a guard of honour, while his coffin was draped in the famous black, green and gold Glen Rovers colours. Thirty books of condolence were filled by the thousands who attended the removal. The funeral Mass was presided over by Bishop Cornelius Lucey while the chief celebrant was Fr Charlie Lynch, brother of former Cork teammate Jack Lynch. Other former Cork teammates involved included Fr Con Cottrell, Fr Bernie Cotter and Fr J. J. O'Brien. Ring's coffin was shouldered into St Colman's churchyard in Cloyne by renowned sporting celebrities from Cork and other counties.

Ring's graveside oration was delivered by Jack Lynch.

== Family life ==
Ring married Rita Taylor at Our Lady of Lourdes Church in Ballinlough on 12 September 1962. Traffic in and around the city was held up for over an hour as thousands turned up to see the wedding. In a major departure for the national radio broadcaster, Radio Éireann included news of the event in their main news bulletin. It was their first report on a sports celebrity wedding. Fledgling television broadcaster, Telefís Éireann, also filmed the wedding for the Nine O'Clock News.

The Rings lived at Avondale Park in Ballintemple for much of their married life. They experienced personal tragedy in raising their children: twin boys Christy and John were born in 1963, however, John died as an infant. Their daughter, Mary, was born in 1966.

== Memorials ==
Shortly after his death, the Ring Memorial Committee's primary objective was the construction of a suitable monument. The site of Ring's former house in Cloyne was chosen as the location as it also acts as the entrance to the Cloyne playing field. Yann Goulet was the sculptor, while Midleton-based sculptor Michael Sheedy created the lettering on the base using Kilkenny limestone. Ring's brother, Willie John, did much of the work on the building of the memorial walls. The monument was unveiled by Jack Lynch on 1 May 1983.

Several years later a statue of Ring was planned for Cork Airport. The idea led to a two-year project to select a winning submission from one of twelve sculptors. Seán McCarthy's winning sculpture was unveiled by Rita Ring in 1995. Over a decade later, a new statue was created and located in the main car park in front of the terminal. The possibility of naming the airport after Ring was mooted in 2010.

In 1987 Cork Corporation sanctioned the construction of a new bridge across the River Lee. Located near the Cork Opera House and straddling the north channel of the river, the bridge links Emmett Place with Carroll's Quay and was named the Christy Ring Bridge.

After the Cork County Board acquired the well-known soccer pitch Flower Lodge in 1988, a period of extensive renovation took place. On 23 May 1993, Páirc Chriostóir Uí Rinn was officially opened and dedicated in Ring's honour.

A new championship for second-tier hurling teams was created and named the Christy Ring Cup in 2005.

== In popular culture ==
In 1964, Ring was the star of a Louis Marcus film. Rather than a recounting of his life and many victories, the film is an instructional one with Ring demonstrating the various skills of the game and ending with highlights of the 1960 league final. The film had its premiere at the Savoy in Cork on 16 October 1964 and ran for several weeks.

A 2001 compilation of Cork GAA songs and poems contains 18 separate pieces on Ring, including ones by writers Seán Ó Tuama, Bryan MacMahon, and Theo Dorgan, and hurler Dermot Kelly. Tom French's 2020 poem "A Pieta" is about Ring's death.

Ring has been the subject of several biographies, including Christy Ring by Val Dorgan (1980) and Christy Ring: Hurling's Greatest by Tim Horgan (2007).

== Quotes ==
- "For the Doc! For the Doc!" Ring's jubilant statement to Éamonn Young following Cork's defeat of Tipperary in the 1952 championship. "The Doc" refers to Young's brother, Dr. Jim Young, who played with Ring on the Cork four-in-a-row team. In winning the Munster final, Cork had prevented Tipperary from the possibility of winning a fourth successive All-Ireland title and equalling the record of the nine.
- "We're the best in everything now." Ring's comment after completing a championship double as a dual player with Glen Rovers and St. Nicholas' in 1954.
- "Keep your eye on the ball, even when it's in the referee's pocket."
- "It isn't so quiet now boy." Ring's riposte to Limerick's Donal Broderick after scoring three goals in four minutes to win the 1956 Munster final. Broderick had held Ring scoreless for more than fifty minutes and had commented that he was having a quiet day.
- "Babs, if Jimmy Doyle was as strong as you and I nobody would ever ask who was the best." Ring's comment to Babs Keating when pressed on who he considered to be the greatest hurler of all time.
- "I like to do the unorthodox and keep defenders worried...I usually attempt what other people might think is impossible."
- "My hurling days are over. Let no one say the best hurlers belong to the past, they're with us now and better yet to come."
- "And if I hadn't been carrying passengers like you, I'd have won at least eight more." Ring's withering put down to a former Cork teammate. The unnamed former player was, by then, a county board official and questioned Ring as to why he tried to get into a match without his official pass by saying: "But Christy, you ought to have [your pass]. You won no less than eight All-Ireland medals".
- "You don't play hurling with your nose." Ring's reply to Seánie O'Leary who feared he may miss the All-Ireland final after breaking his nose when a sliotar struck him during the warm-up prior to the 1977 All-Ireland final.
- "The contest was the most important thing for me. Playing the game was the most important thing as far as I was concerned. It wasn't what I got from it or what was at the end...but to play hurling for Cork...that was the most important thing."
- "The Glen has meant a lot to me. I don't know how you describe the spirit of the Glen, no more than describe the spirit of "the Barr's", or "the Rockies"...or the spirit of Cloyne...I don't know...it's just that they have this tradition of playing the game as it should be played; hard and tough."
- "You should have somebody else here today instead of me. It's about time they stopped talking about me." Ring in a rare television interview with Donncha Ó Dúlaing shortly before his death in 1979.

== Tributes ==
- "'Tis a sin to bury that man." Unknown woman overheard by Professor Seán Ó Tuama at the removal of Ring.
- "'I have seen them all and he is the greatest hurler ever. Ring is a natural. A pocket Hercules, beautifully built with a powerful frame." Pioneering Gaelic games journalist P.D. Mehigan whose recall of games spanned nearly seventy years.
- "'I was twenty years of age in 1922 when I saw my first senior match. I have seen every great hurler since. I have never seen one who attained Christy's standard of excellence and maintained that standard over such a long period of time." Four-time All-Ireland medal winner with Cork Jim Hurley.
- "'The greatest hurler ever to grace a playing field." One-time All-Ireland medal winner with Waterford Christy Moylan.
- "'Any of us who saw him play were privileged. We will never see the like of him again. In my book Christy Ring was always number one, and he always will be." Two-time All-Ireland medal winner with Wexford Bobby Rackard.
- "'[He] enriched the game of hurling more than any other man I knew over forty years. He lived and breathed the very spirit of hurling. He was a giant among giants." Former President of the GAA Pat Fanning.
- "'To us kids Christy was the ultimate. We all modelled ourselves on him." Six-time All-Ireland medal winner with Kilkenny Eddie Keher.
- "'When it comes to selecting the greatest exponent the game has ever seen, measured opinion sees one name out of reach – above all others. That name is Christy Ring of Cork." Three-time All-Ireland medal winner with Wexford Billy Rackard.
- "'There are no words I know of that can adequately do justice to the greatness of the hurler, Christy Ring. If hurling were an international sport his name and fame would stand at least alongside Pelé in soccer, Bradman in cricket, Edwards and Kyle in rugby, Nicklaus and Palmer in golf. But there is no method of measuring genius, man for man, in the various sports. All one can say is that Ring was a genius in his own sport. And his genius in hurling was incomparable." Irish Times sports journalist and friend of Ring, Paddy Downey, writing at the time of his death in 1979.
- "We carried him at last." Three-time All-Ireland medal winner with Cork Paddy Barry, speaking after shouldering the coffin at Ring's funeral. The quote refers to the numerous times that Ring saved Cork from almost certain defeat.
- "'Ring was hurling's Shakespeare, its Pelé, its Mozart. He came as close to perfection as any sportsman can." Irish Independent journalist Éamonn Sweeney.
- "There would be no question about who was the greatest hurler. There's no doubt in my mind whatsoever that Ring was the greatest hurler of all time." Two-time All-Ireland medal winner with Wexford Martin Codd.
- "I never saw anyone like Christy Ring. In my opinion, his sort will never be seen again. He was the best I've ever seen, he had everything." Former GAA President, Paddy Buggy.
- "He's something that comes around once every hundred years. I guarantee you that. I haven't seen anything like him and I don't believe I ever will see anybody like him...Tipperary won eight All-Irelands for me but Ring won eight All-Irelands for Cork." Fellow eight-time All-Ireland medal winner with Tipperary John Doyle.
- "Some people say Mackey was...Eddie Keher...but I have to give it to Christy, number one. Always did." Six-time All-Ireland medal winner with Tipperary Jimmy Doyle.
- "He would be remembered for his hurling ability, for his skill. And the enjoyment, in particular, that he gave to the crowds. He'll always be remembered, he will never be forgotten. There was only one Christy Ring and there'll never be another." Three-time All-Ireland medal winner with Cork Willie John Daly.

== Scoring statistics ==
=== Club ===
Team	Year	Cork		Munster		Total	
Team	Year	Apps	Score	Apps	Score	Apps	Score
Glen Rovers	1941	2	0-01	—		2	0-01
Glen Rovers	1942	2	0-04	—		2	0-04
Glen Rovers	1943	2	1-01	—		2	1-01
Glen Rovers	1944	4	0–14	—		4	0–14
Glen Rovers	1945	3	2–12	—		3	2–12
Glen Rovers	1946	3	3-01	—		3	3-01
Glen Rovers	1947	2	0–10	—		2	0–10
Glen Rovers	1948	3	1-08	—		3	1-08
Glen Rovers	1949	3	1-06	—		3	1-06
Glen Rovers	1950	3	2-05	—		3	2-05
Glen Rovers	1951	4	6-06	—		4	6-06
Glen Rovers	1952	1	0-03	—		1	0-03
Glen Rovers	1953	4	5–10	—		4	5–10
Glen Rovers	1954	4	3–17	—		4	3–17
Glen Rovers	1955	5	11–19	—		5	11–19
Glen Rovers	1956	4	6-08	—		4	6-08
Glen Rovers	1957	1	4-05	—		1	4-05
Glen Rovers	1958	3	7–11	—		3	7–11
Glen Rovers	1959	3	6–12	—		3	6–12
Glen Rovers	1960	4	4-08	—		4	4-08
Glen Rovers	1961	3	2–16	—		3	2–16
Glen Rovers	1962	5	10–12	—		5	10–12
Glen Rovers	1963	1	0-03	—		1	0-03
Glen Rovers	1964	4	2-08	2	1-03	5	3–11
Glen Rovers	1965	0	0-00	—		0	0-00
Glen Rovers	1966	2	3-03	—		2	3-03
Glen Rovers	1967	1	1-02	—		1	1-02
Total		76	80–205	2	1-03	78	81–208

=== Inter-county ===
Team	Year	National League			Munster		All-Ireland		Total	
Team	Year	Division	Apps	Score	Apps	Score	Apps	Score	Apps	Score
Cork	1939–40	Division 1	3	1-01	4	0-04	—		7	1-05
Cork	1940–41	Division 1	5	2-08	2	0-02	1	0-05	8	2–15
Cork	1941–42	Division 1	—		2	0–11	2	0–10	4	0–21
Cork	1942–43	Division 1	—		2	2-03	1	0-04	3	2-07
Cork	1943–44	Division 1	—		3	1-04	2	0-03	5	1-07
Cork	1944–45	Division 1	—		1	0-00	—		1	0-00
Cork	1945–46	Division 1	4	2–14	3	0–12	2	1-08	9	3–34
Cork	1946–47	Division 1	2	3-03	3	3–15	2	0-01	7	6–19
Cork	1947–48	Division 1	6	1–14	2	1-04	—		8	2–18
Cork	1948–49	Division 1	5	3–11	2	0-01	—		7	3–12
Cork	1949–50	Division 1	2	1-08	2	1-06	—		4	2–14
Cork	1950–51	Division 1	1	1-03	2	1-08	—		3	2–11
Cork	1951–52	Division 1	3	2-01	2	1-06	2	0-09	7	3–16
Cork	1952–53	Division 1	4	4–11	2	1–13	1	1-01	7	6–25
Cork	1953–54	Division 1	4	1–11	2	2-09	2	0-09	8	3–29
Cork	1954–55	Division 1	4	1-09	1	0-05	—		5	1–14
Cork	1955–56	Division 1	2	3-06	3	4-08	1	1-05	6	8–14
Cork	1956–57	Division 1	2	3-04	2	2-02	—		4	5-06
Cork	1957–58	Division 1	3	5-04	2	3-05	—		5	8-09
Cork	1958–59	Division 1	3	3-07	2	2–13	—		5	5–20
Cork	1959–60	Division 1	4	12-09	2	1–10	—		6	13–19
Cork	1960–61	Division 1	3	4–10	2	3-08	—		5	7–18
Cork	1961–62	Division 1	6	13–18	1	0-03	—		7	13–21
Cork	1962–63	Division 1	4	6–15	0	0-00	—		4	6–15
Career total			70	71–167	49	28–152	16	3–55	135	102–374

=== Inter-provincial ===
Team	Year	Railway Cup	
Team	Year	Apps	Score
Munster	1941	0	0-00
Munster	1942	1	0-03
Munster	1943	2	2-03
Munster	1944	2	2-00
Munster	1945	2	0-04
Munster	1946	2	1–10
Munster	1947	2	0-03
Munster	1948	2	1-06
Munster	1949	2	4-05
Munster	1950	2	1-05
Munster	1951	2	2-08
Munster	1952	2	4-05
Munster	1953	2	3-05
Munster	1954	2	1-07
Munster	1955	2	3-09
Munster	1956	2	2-04
Munster	1957	3	5–10
Munster	1958	2	0-05
Munster	1959	1	4-05
Munster	1960	2	1-04
Munster	1961	2	2-03
Munster	1962	2	3-01
Munster	1963	2	3-01
Total		43	43–106

== Honours ==
=== Player ===
St. Enda's

- Cork Minor Hurling Championship (1): 1938

Cloyne

- Cork Junior Hurling Championship (1): 1939
- East Cork Junior Hurling Championship (2): 1938, 1939

St. Nicholas'

- Cork Senior Football Championship (1): 1954

Glen Rovers

- Munster Senior Club Hurling Championship (1): 1964
- Cork Senior Hurling Championship (14): 1941, 1944, 1945, 1948, 1949, 1950, 1953, 1954 (c), 1958 (sub), 1959, 1960, 1962, 1964 (c), 1967 (sub)

Cork

- All-Ireland Senior Hurling Championship (8): 1941, 1942, 1943, 1944, 1946 (c), 1952, 1953 (c), 1954 (c)
- Munster Senior Hurling Championship (9): 1942, 1943, 1944, 1946 (c), 1947, 1952, 1953 (c), 1954 (c), 1956 (c)
- National Hurling League (4): 1939–40, 1940–41, 1947–48 (sub), 1952–53
- All-Ireland Minor Hurling Championship (2): 1937 (sub), 1938
- Munster Minor Hurling Championship (1): 1938

Munster

- Railway Cup (18): 1942, 1943, 1944, 1945, 1946, 1948, 1949, 1950, 1951, 1952, 1953, 1955, 1957, 1958, 1959, 1960, 1961, 1963

=== Selector ===
St. Finbarr's College

- Dr. Croke Cup (2): 1963, 1969
- Dr. Harty Cup (2): 1963, 1969

Glen Rovers

- All-Ireland Senior Club Hurling Championship (2): 1973, 1977
- Munster Senior Club Hurling Championship (2): 1972, 1976
- Cork Senior Hurling Championship (2): 1972, 1976

Cork

- All-Ireland Senior Hurling Championship (3): 1976, 1977, 1978
- Munster Senior Hurling Championship (3): 1976, 1977, 1978
- Oireachtas Cup (1): 1975

=== Individual ===
Honours

- Hurling Team of the Millennium: Right wing-forward
- Munster Hurling Team of the Millennium: Left wing-forward
- Hurling Team of the Century: Right wing-forward
- Cork Hurling Team of the Century: Left wing-forward
- The 125 greatest stars of the GAA: No. 2
- Texaco Hurler of the Year: 1959
- Texaco Hall of Fame Award: 1971
- GAA Hall of Fame Inductee: 2013

== See also ==
- List of All-Ireland Senior Hurling Championship medal winners
- List of people on the postage stamps of Ireland

== Bibliography ==
- Val Dorgan, Christy Ring, (Ward River Press, 1980).
- Brendan Fullam, Captains of the Ash, (Wolfhound Press, 2002).
- Tim Horgan, Christy Ring: Hurling's Greatest, (The Collins Press, 2007).
- Colm Keane, Hurling’s Top 20, (Mainstream Publishing, 2002).
- Éamonn Sweeney, Munster Hurling Legends, (O’Brien Press, 2002).

Sporting positions
Preceded by Seán Condon	Cork Senior Hurling Captain; 1946	Succeeded by Seán Condon
Preceded by Jim Young	Cork Senior Hurling Captain; 1950	Succeeded by John Lyons
Preceded by Paddy Barry	Cork Senior Hurling Captain; 1953–1954	Succeeded by Vincy Twomey
Preceded by Tony O'Shaughnessy	Cork Senior Hurling Captain; 1956	Succeeded by Tony O'Shaughnessy
Achievements
Preceded by John Maher (Tipperary)	All-Ireland Senior Hurling Final winning captain 1946	Succeeded by Dan Kennedy (Kilkenny)
Preceded by Paddy Barry (Cork)	All-Ireland Senior Hurling Final winning captain 1953–1954	Succeeded by Nick O'Donnell (Wexford)
Awards and achievements
Preceded by Tony Wall (Tipperary)	Caltex Hurler of the Year; 1959	Succeeded by Nick O'Donnell (Wexford)
