= Gerald Murphy (hurler) =

Irish hurler

Personal information
- Native name: Gearóid Ó Murchu (Irish)
- Born: 1928 Midleton, County Cork, Ireland
- Died: 14 July 1978 (aged 49) Dublin, Ireland
- Height: 5 ft 9 in (175 cm)

Sport
- Sport: Hurling
- Position: Midfield
Club
- Years: Club
- Midleton
Club titles
- Cork titles: 0
Inter-county*
| Years | County | Apps (scores) |
| 1949-1957 | Cork | 20 (2-5) |
Inter-county titles
- Munster titles: 4
- All-Irelands: 3
- NHL: 1
- *Inter County team apps and scores correct as of 16:24, 11 April 2015.

Gerald Murphy (1928 – 14 July 1978) was an Irish hurler who played as a midfielder for the Cork senior team.

Born in Midleton, County Cork, Murphy first played competitive hurling in his youth. He arrived on the inert-county scene at the age of seventeen when he first linked up with the Cork minor team before later joining the junior side. He made his senior debut during the 1949 championship. Murphy immediately became a regular member of the team and won three All-Ireland medals, four Munster medals and one National Hurling League medal. He was an All-Ireland runner-up on one occasion.

As a member of the Munster inter-provincial team on a number of occasions Murphy won one Railway Cup medal. At club level he was a one-time championship medallist in the intermediate grade with Midleton.

Throughout his career Murphy made 20 championship appearances. He retired from inter-county hurling following the conclusion of the 1957 championship.

== Playing career ==
=== Club ===
Murphy became one of Midleton's top forwards throughout the late forties. In 1948 he lined out against Shanballymore in the final of the intermediate championship. A huge 6-4 to 1-1 victory gave Midleton the victory and gave Murphy a championship medal.

=== Inter-county ===
==== Beginnings ====
Murphy first played for Cork as a member of the minor team on 1 July 1945 in a 6-11 to 4-2 Munster semi-final defeat by Tipperary. His two years as a member of the minor team yielded little in terms of championship success.

In 1948 Murphy was added to the Cork junior team, however, he was an unused substitute as Cork exited the championship after a 4-7 to 4-5 Munster final defeat by Limerick.

Murphy made his senior championship debut on 29 May 1949. He scored two goals as Cork recorded a 3-10 apiece Munster quarter-final draw with Tipperary. He was dropped from the starting fifteen for the replay but was introduced as a substitute as Cork endured a 2-8 to 1-9 defeat after extra time.

==== Three-in-a-row ====
After a period of dominance by Tipperary between 1949 and 1951, Cork bounced back in 1952. A late Paddy Barry goal gave Cork a 1-11 to 2-6 defeat of four-in-a-row hopefuls Tipperary. It was Murphy's first Munster medal. On 7 September 1952 Cork faced Dublin in the All-Ireland decider. An appendicitis ruled Joe Hartnett out of the game, resulting in Willie John Daly being switched to centre-forward. Liam Dowling scored a vital goal in the first half to give Cork the interval lead. Dublin's attack collapsed in the second half as Dowling scored a second goal. The 2-14 to 0-7 victory gave Murphy his first All-Ireland medal.

Murphy added a National Hurling League medal to his collection in 1953 as Cork defeated Tipperary by 2-10 to 2-7. In the subsequent provincial championship he won a second Munster medal as Cork once again downed their arch rivals by 3-10 to 1-11. On 6 September 1953 Cork faced Galway in what was one of the dirtiest All-Ireland deciders of all time. Galway went into the game with the intention of upsetting their opponents physically and did just that, however, the game remains clouded in controversy due to the injury to the Galway captain, Mick Burke. The result remained in doubt right up to the final whistle, however, Cork secured a 3-3 to 0-8 victory. Murphy had won his second All-Ireland medal. After the match at the Gresham Hotel in Dublin a fight broke out when another Galway player struck Cork's Christy Ring. The following morning another fight broke out when another member of the Galway panel attempted to hit Ring. The fights, however, ended just as quickly as they had started.

Cork secured a third successive provincial title in 1954, with Murphy collecting a third Munster medal following a narrow 2-8 to 1-8 defeat of Tipperary. A record crowd of 84,856 attended the subsequent All-Ireland decider on 5 September 1954 with Wexford providing the opposition. Wexford had a four point lead with seventeen minutes left to play, however, history was against the Leinster champions when Johnny Clifford scored the winning goal for Cork with just four minutes left. A narrow 1-9 to 1-6 victory secured a third successive All-Ireland for Cork and for Murphy .

==== Decline ====
Four-in-a-row proved beyond Cork, however, the team bounced back in 1955. A 5-5 to 3-5 defeat of Limerick, courtesy of a hat trick of goals by Christy Ring, secured a fourth Munster medal in five seasons for Murphy. This victory allowed Cork to advance directly to an All-Ireland final meeting with Wexford on 23 September 1956. The game has gone down in history as one of the all-time classics as Christy Ring was bidding for a record ninth All-Ireland medal. The game turned on one important incident as the Wexford goalkeeper, Art Foley, made a miraculous save from a Ring shot and cleared the sliotar up the field to set up another attack. Nicky Rackard scored a crucial goal with two minutes to go giving Wexford a 2-14 to 2-8 victory.

Cork surrendered their Munster title to an up-and-coming Waterford team in 1957, bring the curtain down on Murphy's inter-county career.

=== Inter-provincial ===
In 1953 Daly was included on the Munster inter-provincial team for the first time. That year Munster faced arch rivals Leinster in the decider. A narrow 5-7 to 5-5 victory gave him a Railway Cup medal.

== Honours ==
=== Team ===
Midleton

- Cork Intermediate Hurling Championship (1): 1948

Cork

- All-Ireland Senior Hurling Championship (3): 1952, 1953, 1954
- Munster Senior Hurling Championship (4): 1952, 1953, 1954, 1956
- National Hurling League (2): 1947-48, 1952-53

Munster

- Railway Cup (1): 1953
