= Jim Brophy =

Irish hurler

Personal information
- Native name: Séamus Ó Bróithe (Irish)
- Born: 1920 Danesfort, County Kilkenny, Ireland
- Died: October 1998 (aged 77–78) Galway, Ireland
- Occupation: Army officer

Sport
- Sport: Hurling
- Position: Right corner-back
Clubs
- Years: Club
- An Céad Cath Gaelach; Liam Mellows
Club titles
- Galway titles: 2
Inter-county
- Years: County
- 1940-1954: Galway
Inter-county titles
- All-Irelands: 0
- NHL: 1

James Brophy (1920 – October 1998) was an Irish hurler who played as a right corner-back for the Galway senior team.

Brophy joined the team during the 1940-41 National League and was a regular member of the starting fifteen until his retirement after the 1954 championship. During that time he won one National Hurling League medal. Brophy was an All-Ireland runner-up on one occasion.

At club level Brophy was a two-time county club championship medalist with An Céad Cath Gaelach.

== Playing career ==
=== Club ===
Brophy began his club hurling career at underage levels with Danesfort in Kilkenny.

After moving to Galway he joined the An Céad Cath Gaelach club and went on to enjoy much success. The team were beaten by Loughrea in the 1941 decider and were also beaten in the county finals of 1945 and 1946 when city rivals Liam Mellows, for whom Brophy played for one season, proved their bogey-team.

Brophy was captain in 1947 as the team set out to avoid losing a third successive championship decider. A 4-13 to 3-3 defeat of Carnore gave him a Galway Senior Hurling Championship medal.

St. Coleman's of Gort were the opponents in the county final of 1948. A thrilling 7-7 to 6-2 score line gave Brophy a second championship medal as captain.

=== Inter-county ===
Brophy first came to prominence on the inter-county scene as a member of the Galway junior hurling team in 1940. He won a Connacht medal in that grade that year following a 6-5 to 1-4 trouncing of Roscommon. The subsequent All-Ireland final saw Galway face Cork. A narrow 3-3 to 3-1 defeat was Brophy's lot on that occasion.

The subsequent National League campaign saw Brophy make his senior debut for Galway. His arrival coincided with an upturn in the fortunes of the senior team. In spite of this Galway were denied an All-Ireland final appearance no fewer than three times by a solitary point.

In 1951 Galway defeated an up-and-coming Wexford to qualify for the final of the National Hurling League against New York. The westerners survived a late onslaught to secure a 2-11 to 2-8 victory. It was Brophy's first National League medal.

Two years later in 1953 Galway qualified for the All-Ireland final for the first time in twenty-five years. A tempestuous hour of hurling against Cork resulted in a 3-3 to 0-8 defeat. The game, however, was clouded in controversy due to the injury to the Galway captain, Mickey Burke. After the match at the Gresham Hotel in Dublin a fight broke out when another Galway player struck Ring. The following morning another fight broke out when another member of the Galway panel attempted to hit Ring. The fights, however, ended just as quickly as they had started.

Brophy retired from inter-county hurling in 1954.

=== Inter-provincial ===
Brophy also lined out with Connacht in the inter-provincial series of games and enjoyed the ultimate success. In 1947 Connacht reached the decider and faced a star-studded Munster team. Brophy came in for special praise for the way he subdued Jackie Power. He collected a Railway Cup medal following the 2-5 to 1-1 victory.
