= Séamus Hearne =

Irish hurler (1932–2008)

Personal information
- Native name: Séamus (Irish)
- Born: 1932 Curracloe, County Wexford, Ireland
- Died: 7 November 2008 (aged 76) Wembley, London, England
- Occupation: Carpenter
- Height: 5 ft 9 in (175 cm)

Sport
- Sport: Hurling
- Position: Midfield
Clubs
- Years: Club
- Ardcolm; Shelmaliers; Midleton; Blackrock
Club titles
- Cork titles: 1
Inter-county*
Years	County	Apps (scores)
1951–1959	Wexford	16 (2–5)
Inter-county titles
- Leinster titles: 3
- All-Irelands: 2
- NHL: 2
- *Inter County team apps and scores correct as of 22:01, 16 February 2015.

Séamus Hearne (1932 - 7 November 2008) was an Irish hurler who played as a midfielder for the Wexford senior team.

Born in Curracloe, County Wexford, Hearne first arrived on the inter-county scene at the age of seventeen when he first linked up with the Wexford minor team. He joined the senior panel during the 1951 championship. Hearne later became a regular member of the starting fifteen, and won two All-Ireland medals, three Leinster medals and two National League medals on the field of play. He was an All-Ireland runner-up on one occasion.

As a member of the Leinster inter-provincial team on a number of occasions, Hearne won one Railway Cup medal. At club level he played with Ardcolm, Shelmaliers, Midleton and Blackrock, winning one championship medal.

Throughout his career Hearne made 16 championship appearances. He retired from inter-county hurling following the conclusion of the 1959 championship.

== Honours ==
=== Player ===
Blackrock

- Cork Senior Hurling Championship (1): 1956

Wexford

- All-Ireland Senior Hurling Championship (2): 1955, 1956
- Leinster Senior Hurling Championship (4): 1951 (sub), 1954, 1955, 1956
- National Hurling League (2): 1955–56, 1957–58
