= Vincy Twomey =

Irish hurler (1929–1993)

Personal information
- Native name: Uinseann Ó Tuama (Irish)
- Born: 1929 Blackpool, Cork, Ireland
- Died: 30 May 1993 (aged 64) Blackpool, Cork, Ireland

Sport
- Sport: Hurling
- Position: Centre-back
Club
- Years: Club
- 1950-1958: Glen Rovers
Club titles
- Cork titles: 4
Inter-county*
Years	County	Apps (scores)
1950-1957	Cork	19 (0-1)
Inter-county titles
- Munster titles: 4
- All-Irelands: 3
- NHL: 1
- *Inter County team apps and scores correct as of 18:46, 12 September 2014.

Vincent "Vincy" Twomey (1929 – 30 May 1993) was an Irish hurler who played as a centre-back for the Cork senior team.

Born in Blackpool, Cork, Twomey first arrived on the inter-county scene at the age of seventeen when he first linked up with the Cork minor team before later joining the junior side. He joined the senior panel during the 1950 championship. Twomey went on to play a key role during a golden age for the team, and won three All-Ireland medals, four Munster medals and one National Hurling League medal. He was an All-Ireland runner-up on one occasion.

As a member of the Munster inter-provincial team on a number of occasions, Twomey won one Railway Cup medal. At club level he was a multiple championship medallist with Glen Rovers. Twomey also enjoyed championship success as a Gaelic footballer with St. Nicholas'.

Throughout his career Twomey made 19 championship appearances. He retired from inter-county hurling following the conclusion of the 1957 championship.

== Honours ==
=== Team ===
Glen Rovers

- Cork Senior Hurling Championship (4): 1950, 1953, 1954, 1958

St. Nicholas'

- Cork Senior Football Championship (1): 1954

Cork

- All-Ireland Senior Hurling Championship (3): 1952, 1953, 1954
- Munster Senior Hurling Championship (4): 1952, 1953, 1954, 1956
- National Hurling League (1): 1952-53
- All-Ireland Junior Hurling Championship (1): 1950
- Munster Junior Hurling Championship (1): 1950

Munster

- Railway Cup (1): 2000

Sporting positions
Preceded by Christy Ring	Cork Senior Hurling Captain; 1955	Succeeded by Tony O'Shaughnessy
