= Jim Morrissey (hurler) =

Wexford hurler (1927–1997)

Personal information
- Native name: Séamus Ó Muireasa (Irish)
- Born: 1927 Piercestown, County Wexford, Ireland
- Died: 10 November 1997 (aged 69–70) Enniscorthy, County Wexford, Ireland
- Occupation: Truck driver
- Height: 5 ft 11 in (180 cm)

Sport
- Sport: Hurling
- Position: Midfield
Clubs
- Years: Club
- Young Irelands; St Martin's
Club titles
- Kilkenny titles: 0
Inter-county
- Years: County
- 1946–1961: Wexford
Inter-county titles
- Leinster titles: 5
- All-Irelands: 3
- NHL: 2

James Morrissey (1927 – 10 November 1997) was an Irish hurler. At club level he played with Young Irelands and St Martin's and was a three-time All-Ireland Championship winner with the Wexford senior hurling team.

== Honours ==
Wexford

- All-Ireland Senior Hurling Championship (3): 1955, 1956, 1960
- Leinster Senior Hurling Championship (5): 1951, 1954, 1955, 1956, 1960
- National Hurling League (2): 1955–56, 1957–58
