= Derry Hayes =

Irish hurler

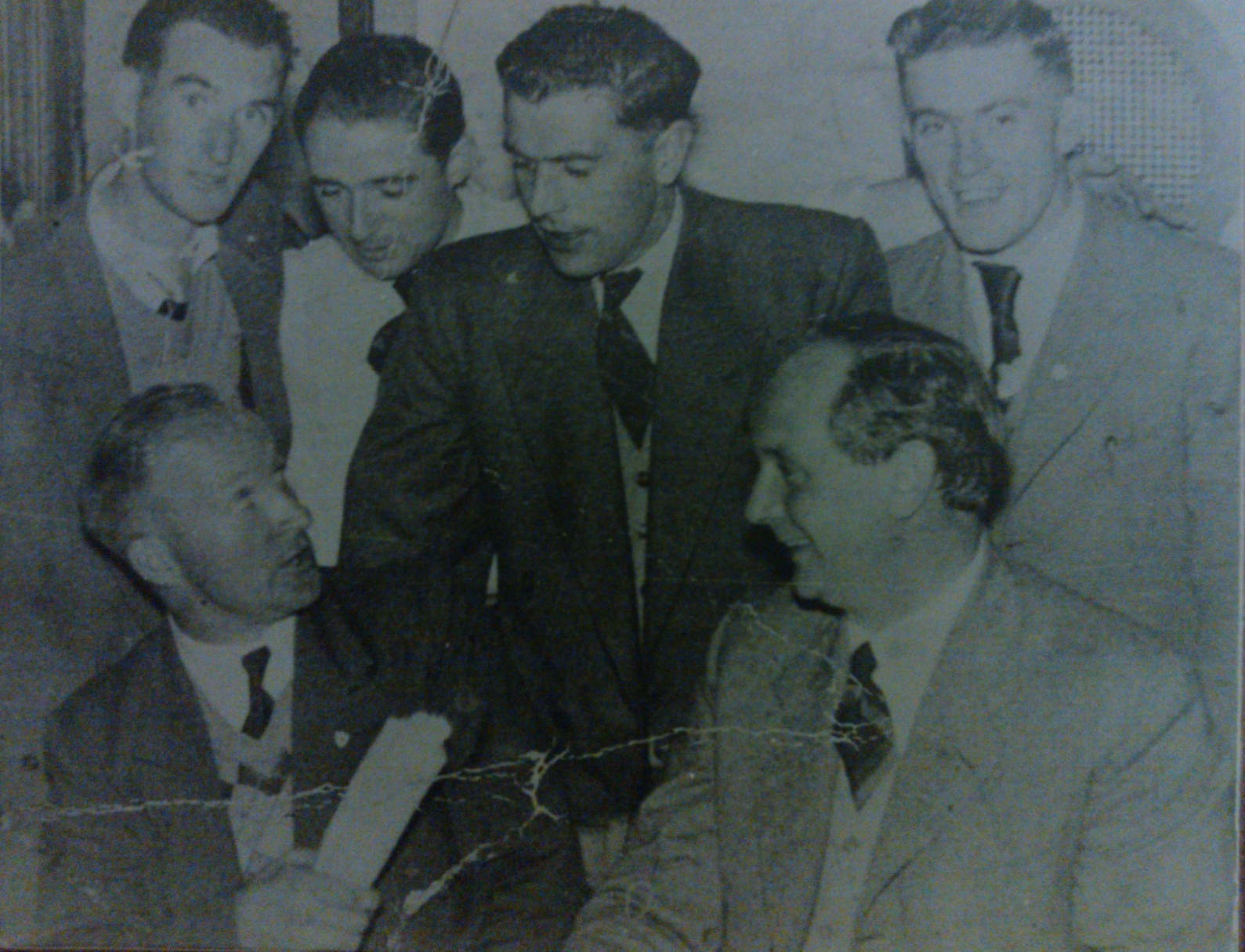
- Derry Hayes (centre)

Personal information
- Native name: Diarmuid Ó hAodha (Irish)
- Born: 1927 Blackrock, Cork, Ireland
- Died: 18 March 2005 (aged 77) Mercy Hospital, Cork, Ireland
- Occupation: Factory worker
- Height: 5 ft 9 in (175 cm)

Sport
- Sport: Hurling
- Position: Centre-back
Club
- Years: Club
- Blacrock
Club titles
- Cork titles: 0
Inter-county*
Years	County	Apps (scores)
1953-1955	Cork	8 (0-00)
Inter-county titles
- Munster titles: 2
- All-Irelands: 2
- *Inter County team apps and scores correct as of 18:15, 23 March 2019.

Derry Hayes (1927 – 18 March 2005) was an Irish hurler who played for Cork Championship club Blackrock. He played for the Cork senior hurling team for three years, during which time he usually lined out in the half-back line.

== Honours ==
Blackrock

- Cork Junior Hurling Championship (1): 1947

Cork

- All-Ireland Senior Hurling Championship (2): 1953, 1954
- Munster Senior Hurling Championship (2): 1953, 1954
