= Bobby Donovan =

Personal information
- Native name: Roibeárd Ó Donnabháin (Irish)
- Born: 1927 Newbawn, County Wexford, Ireland
- Died: 27 October 2009 (aged 82) Kiltale, Dunsany, County Meath
- Occupation: Agri-food researcher

Sport
- Sport: Hurling
- Position: Left corner-forward
Inter-county
- Years: County
- 1950-1955: Wexford
Inter-county titles
- Leinster titles: 2
- All-Irelands: 0
- NHL: 0

Robert Donovan (1927 - 27 October 2009) was an Irish hurler who played as a left corner-forward for the Wexford senior team.

Born in Newbawn, County Wexford, Donovan first played competitive hurling during his schooling at St. Peter's College. He arrived on the inter-county scene at the age of twenty-three when he first linked up with the Wexford senior team, making his debut in the 1950 championship. Donovan later played with the Wexford junior hurling and football teams before returning to the senior ranks. During his career he won two Leinster medals. He was an All-Ireland runner-up on one occasion.

His retirement came following Wexford's defeat by Cork in the 1954 championship.

== Honours ==
=== Team ===
Wexford

- Leinster Senior Hurling Championship (2): 1951, 1954
