= Paddy Kehoe =

Irish Gaelic football and hurling manager

Patrick Kehoe (6 June 1922 – 4 February 2016) was an Irish Gaelic football and hurling manager as well as a dual player at the highest levels as a right wing-forward with the Wexford senior teams.

== Honours ==
Gusserane O'Rahillys

- Wexford Senior Football Championship (4): 1945, 1946, 1947, 1954

Horeswood

- Wexford Junior Hurling Championship (1): 1947

Wexford

- All-Ireland Senior Hurling Championship (2): 1955, 1956 (
- Leinster Senior Hurling Championship (4): 1951, 1954 (sub), 1955 (sub), 1956
- Leinster Senior Football Championship (1): 1945
