= Willie John Daly =

Irish hurler and coach

Personal information
- Native name: Liam Seán Ó Dálaigh (Irish)
- Nickname: Dal
- Born: 25 January 1925 Carrigtwohill, County Cork, Ireland
- Died: 29 November 2017 (aged 92) Cobh, County Cork, Ireland
- Occupation: ESB employee
- Height: 5 ft 8 in (173 cm)

Sport
- Sport: Hurling
- Position: Centre-forward
Clubs
- Years: Club
- Carrigtwohill; Imokilly
Club titles
- Cork titles: 0
Inter-county*
Years	County	Apps (scores)
1947–1957	Cork	26 (5–24)
Inter-county titles
- Munster titles: 4
- All-Irelands: 3
- NHL: 2
- *Inter County team apps and scores correct as of 20:21, 10 April 2015.

William John Daly (25 January 1925 – 29 November 2017) was an Irish hurler and coach who played as a centre-forward for the Cork senior team.

Born in Carrigtwohill, County Cork, Daly first arrived on the inter-county scene at the age of twenty-two when he first linked up with the Cork junior team. He made his senior debut during the 1947 championship. Daly immediately became a regular member of the team and won three All-Ireland medals, four Munster medals and two National Hurling League medals. He was an All-Ireland runner-up on two occasions.

As a member of the Munster inter-provincial team on a number of occasions Daly won three Railway Cup medals. At club level he won several championship medals in the junior and intermediate grades with Carrigtwohill. Daly also played for divisional side Imokilly.

Throughout his career Daly made 26 championship appearances. He retired from inter-county hurling following the conclusion of the 1957 championship.

In retirement from playing Daly became involved in team management and coaching. At club level he served as trainer of the Carrigtwohill senior team while he also took over as coach of the Cork senior team.

== Playing career ==
=== Club ===
Daly first played for Carrigtwohill as a member of the junior team in 1941. After winning several East Cork titles Carrigtwohill reached the county decider in 1948. Cloughduv provided the opposition, however, three goals in the opening quarter put Carrig into a commanding position they never relinquished. A fourth goal just before half-time and two more in the second half secured a 6–5 to 1–1 victory. It was Daly's first championship medal.

After being promoted to the intermediate grade in 1949, Carrigtwohill reached the final against Newtownshandum at their first attempt. Carrig played with the wind in the first half and opened the scoring with a left-handed point from over sixty yards by Daly. He came in for particular praise for scoring several points on his own as well as being involved in the lead-up to most of the side's scores. Carrigtwohill secured a 3–10 to 3–5 victory, with Daly collecting a championship medal in that grade.

Carrigtwohill reached a second successive intermediate decider in 1950. After trailing by seven points to Shanballymore at the interval, Carrig sprung to life in the second half. A late goal from Daly secured the 6–4 to 6–1 victory. Not only did Daly collect a second championship medal in that grade but he also had the honour of lifting the cup as captain of the team.

=== Inter-county ===
==== Beginnings ====
Daly first played for Cork as a member of the junior hurling team on 25 May 1947 in a 3–10 to 2–1 Munster quarter-final defeat of Kerry. He later won a Munster medal at left wing-forward following an 11–8 to 1–3 trouncing of Waterford. Subsequent defeats of Galway and Dublin set up an All-Ireland final meeting with London on 14 September 1947. Daly scored five points as Cork secured a 3–10 to 2–3 victory and the All-Ireland title.

His performances during the junior campaign saw Daly drafted onto the Cork senior panel for an All-Ireland showdown with Kilkenny on 7 September 1947. He remained on the bench for the entire game which Cork narrowly lost by 0–14 to 2–7.

Daly quickly became a regular member of the starting fifteen over the course of the 1947–48 league campaign. He was at left wing-forward for the subsequent final against Tipperary, and collected his first National League medal after Cork's 3–3 to 1–2 victory. On 18 July 1948 Daly made a goal-scoring senior championship debut in a 5–3 to 2–5 Munster semi-final defeat of Limerick.

==== Three-in-a-row ====
After a period of dominance by Tipperary between 1949 and 1951, Cork bounced back in 1952. A late Paddy Barry goal gave Cork a 1–11 to 2–6 defeat of four-in-a-row hopefuls Tipperary. It was Daly's first Munster medal. On 7 September 1952 Cork faced Dublin in the All-Ireland decider. An appendicitis ruled Joe Hartnett out of the game, resulting in Daly being switched to centre-forward. Liam Dowling scored a vital goal in the first half to give Cork the interval lead. Dublin's attack collapsed in the second half as Dowling scored a second goal. The 2–14 to 0–7 victory gave Daly his first All-Ireland medal.

Daly added a league medal to his collection in 1953 as Cork defeated Tipperary by 2–10 to 2–7. In the subsequent provincial championship he won a second Munster medal as Cork once again downed their archrivals by 3–10 to 1–11. On 6 September 1953 Cork faced Galway in what was one of the dirtiest All-Ireland deciders of all time. Galway went into the game with the intention of upsetting their opponents physically and did just that, however, the game remains clouded in controversy due to the injury to the Galway captain, Mick Burke. The result remained in doubt right up to the final whistle, however, Cork secured a 3–3 to 0–8 victory. Daly, who finished the game in his socks after discarding his boots, won his second All-Ireland medal. After the match at the Gresham Hotel in Dublin a fight broke out when another Galway player struck Cork's Christy Ring. The following morning another fight broke out when another member of the Galway panel attempted to hit Ring. The fights, however, ended just as quickly as they had started.

Cork secured a third successive provincial title in 1954, with Daly collecting a third Munster medal following a narrow 2–8 to 1–8 defeat of Tipperary. A record crowd of 84,856 attended the subsequent All-Ireland decider on 5 September 1954 with Wexford providing the opposition. Wexford had a four-point lead with seventeen minutes left to play, however, history was against the Leinster champions when Johnny Clifford scored the winning goal for Cork with just four minutes left. A narrow 1–9 to 1–6 victory secured a third successive All-Ireland for Cork and for Daly.

==== Decline ====
Four-in-a-row proved beyond Cork, however, the team bounced back in 1955. A 5–5 to 3–5 defeat of Limerick, courtesy of a hat trick of goals by Christy Ring, secured a fourth Munster medal in five seasons for Daly. This victory allowed Cork to advance directly to an All-Ireland final meeting with Wexford on 23 September 1956. The game has gone down in history as one of the all-time classics as Christy Ring was bidding for a record ninth All-Ireland medal. The game turned on one important incident as the Wexford goalkeeper, Art Foley, made a miraculous save from a Ring shot and cleared the sliotar up the field to set up another attack. Nicky Rackard scored a crucial goal with two minutes to go giving Wexford a 2–14 to 2–8 victory.

Cork surrendered their Munster title to an up-and-coming Waterford team in 1957, bringing the curtain down on Daly's inter-county career.

=== Inter-provincial ===
In 1951 Daly was included on the Munster inter-provincial panel for the first time. That year Munster faced archrivals Leinster in the decider. Daly was introduced as a substitute at centre-forward and collected his first Railway Cup medal following a 4–9 to 3–6 victory.

Two years later Daly was a key member of the starting fifteen as Munster faced Leinster in the decider once again. A narrow 5–7 to 5–5 victory gave him a second Railway Cup medal.

After withdrawing from the team in 1954, Daly was back on the starting fifteen again in 1955. A double scores 6–8 to 3–4 defeat of Connacht gave Daly a third and final Railway Cup medal.

== Coaching career ==
Daly first became involved in coaching in the 1950s when he was part of the selection committee of the Carrigtwohill senior team.

In 1972 Daly took charge as coach of the Cork senior team. Championship success eluded Cork during his tenure, however, Daly steered the team to a fourth league title in six years in 1974 following a 6–15 to 1–12 defeat of Limerick.

Daly returned as coach of the Carrigtwohill senior team in the late 1970s.

== Honours ==
=== Team ===
Carrigtwohill

- Cork Intermediate Hurling Championship (1): 1950
- Cork Junior Hurling Championship (2): 1948, 1949 (c)

Cork

- All-Ireland Senior Hurling Championship (3): 1952, 1953, 1954
- Munster Senior Hurling Championship (4): 1952, 1953, 1954, 1956
- National Hurling League (2): 1947–48, 1952–53
- All-Ireland Junior Hurling Championship (1): 1947
- Munster Junior Hurling Championship (1): 1947

Munster

- Railway Cup (3): 1951, 1953, 1955

=== Coach ===
Cork

- National Hurling League (1): 1973–74
