= Jerry O'Riordan =

Irish hurler (1925–1987)

Personal information
- Native name: Diarmuid Ó Riordáin (Irish)
- Nickname: Jerry
- Born: 1925 Blackrock, Cork, Ireland
- Died: 16 June 1987 (aged 62) Dooradoyle, Limerick, Ireland
- Occupations: Customs and excise official
- Height: 6 ft 0 in (183 cm)

Sport
- Sport: Hurling
- Position: Full-forward/Left corner-back
Clubs
- Years: Club
- Blackrock; Civil Service; Claughaun; Ahane
Club titles
- Limerick titles: 0
Inter-county
Years	County	Apps (scores)
1945 1946-1954	Dublin; Cork	2; 26 (5-06)
Inter-county titles
- Munster titles: 5
- All-Irelands: 4
- NHL: 1

Jeremiah O'Riordan (1925 – 16 June 1987) was an Irish hurler, who played as a corner-back and as a full-forward, and is most known for his time with the Cork senior hurling team. He was the elder brother of Mossy O'Riordan.

== Career ==
Born in Cork, O'Riordan was educated at Sullivan's Quay and the North Monastery, where he won a Harty Cup medal. He began his club hurling career with the Blackrock club, before later lining out with the Civil Service club in Dublin and ending his career with Claughaun and Ahane in Limerick. Coughlan first appeared on the inter-county scene with the Dublin senior hurling team that lost the 1945 Leinster final to Kilkenny. He transferred to the Cork senior hurling team the following season and ended his debut year with an All-Ireland Championship title. O'Riordan was a mainstay of the team for nearly a decade and was at right corner-back for Cork's three successive All-Ireland titles between 1952 and 1954. His other honours with Cork include five Munster Championship titles and a National Hurling League. O'Riordan also earned selection with the Leinster and Rest of Ireland teams and won two Railway Cup medals with Munster. He was chosen on the Cork Team of the Century in 1984.

== Personal life and death ==
O'Riordan spent his entire working life with the Customs and Excise and was based in Bantry, Dublin and finally Limerick where he worked as a collector. He died at Limerick Regional Hospital on 16 June 1987.

== Honours ==
Cork

- All-Ireland Senior Hurling Championship: 1946, 1952, 1953, 1954
- Munster Senior Hurling Championship: 1946, 1947, 1952, 1953, 1954
- National Hurling League: 1952-53

Munster

- Railway Cup: 1950, 1955
