= Tommy Purcell =

Irish hurler

Personal information
- Native name: Tomás Puirséil (Irish)
- Born: Littleton, County Tipperary, Ireland

Sport
- Sport: Hurling
- Position: Forward
Club
- Years: Club
- 1940s: Moycarkey–Borris
Club titles
- Cork titles: 1
Inter-county
- Years: County
- 1940ss: Tipperary
Inter-county titles
- Munster titles: 1
- All-Irelands: 1

Tommy Purcell (1921–1949) was an Irish sportsperson. He played hurling with his local club Moycarkey–Borris and was a member of the Tipperary senior inter-county team in the 1940s. Purcell won a set of All-Ireland and Munster winners' medals at senior level with Tipperary in 1945.

On St Patrick's Day in 1949, Purcell was one of three hurlers from Tipperary on the winning Munster Railway Cup team; he was a wingback. It was his last game. He died the following September.
