= Tom O'Sullivan (hurler) =

Irish hurler

Personal information
- Native name: Tomás Ó Súilleabháin (Irish)
- Born: 1932 Buttevant, County Cork, Ireland

Sport
- Sport: Hurling
- Position: Goalkeeper
Clubs
- Years: Club
- Buttevant → Avondhu
Club titles
- Cork titles: 1
Inter-county
Years	County	Apps (scores)
1952-1954	Cork	2 (1-00)
Inter-county titles
- Munster titles: 2
- All-Irelands: 2
- NHL: 1

Thomas O'Sullivan was an Irish sportsperson who played hurling with the Cork senior inter-county team in the 1950s. At club level, O'Sullivan played for Buttevant.

O'Sullivan, who played in the corner-forward position, first came to prominence with the Cork senior hurlers in the early 1950s. He was a member of the Cork team that defeated Galway in the 1953 All-Ireland Senior Hurling Championship final. In 1954, O'Sullivan was a member of the Cork team that won the Munster Senior Hurling Championship final against Tipperary. He came on as a substitute during Cork's subsequent victory over Wexford in the 1954 All-Ireland Senior Hurling Championship final.
