= John Kiely (Waterford hurler) =

Irish hurler

Personal information
- Native name: Seán Ó Cadhla (Irish)
- Born: 1927 Dungarvan, County Waterford, Ireland
- Died: 18 June 2004 (aged 77) Abbeyside, County Waterford, Ireland
- Height: 5 ft 7 in (170 cm)

Sport
- Sport: Hurling
- Position: Left corner-forward
Clubs
- Years: Club
- Dungarvan; Seán McDermotts
Inter-county
- Years: County
- 1948-1959: Waterford
Inter-county titles
- Munster titles: 3
- All-Irelands: 2

John Kiely (1927–2004) was an Irish sportsperson. He played hurling with his local club Dungarvan and with the Waterford senior inter-county team in the 1940s and 1950s.

== Playing career ==
=== Club ===
Kiely played most of his club hurling with his local Dungarvan club. He played in two county finals but never won a senior county medal. Kiely also won junior championship honours with Brickey Rangers and Éire Óg.

=== Inter-county ===
Kiely first came to prominence on the Waterford senior inter-county team in the late 1940s. He played in the first round of the Munster Championship in 1948, however, in spite of no further appearances that year, he was still eligible to receive both Munster and All-Ireland medals following Waterford's victories over Cork and Dublin respectively. It would be 1957 before Kiely won his first Munster title on the field of play. Waterford later played Kilkenny in the All-Ireland final, however, victory went to the men from Leinster on that occasion. The team would later come to rue this defeat as an All-Ireland title that they should have won. Waterford lost their provincial crown in 1958, however, the team bounced back in 1959 with Kiely collecting a second Munster title. Once again Waterford subsequently lined out in the championship decider and, once again, Kilkenny provided the opposition. The game ended in a draw, however, when the two sides met for the replay a few weeks later the men from Waterford made no mistake in defeating their near rivals and Kiely collected his first All-Ireland medal on the field of play. He retired from inter-county hurling shortly afterwards.

Kiely also won Railway Cup honours with Munster in 1952 and 1957. He was also a magnificent handballer and participated in many Masters. John Kiely died on 18 June 2004.
