= 1953 All-Ireland Senior Hurling Championship final =

1953 All-Ireland Senior Hurling Final
- Event: 1953 All-Ireland Senior Hurling Championship
Cork	Galway
3–3	0–8
- Date: 6 September 1953
- Venue: Croke Park, Dublin
- Referee: P. O'Connell (Offaly)
- Attendance: 71,195

The 1953 All-Ireland Senior Hurling Championship Final was the 66th All-Ireland Final and the culmination of the 1953 All-Ireland Senior Hurling Championship, an inter-county hurling tournament for the top teams in Ireland. The match was held at Croke Park, Dublin, on 6 September 1953, between Cork and Galway. The Connacht men narrowly lost to their Munster opponents on a score line of 3–3 to 0–8.

== Match details ==
1953-09-06
15:15 IST
Final

Cork	3–3 – 0–8	Galway

Croke Park, Dublin
Attendance: 71,195
Referee: P. O'Connell (Offaly)

Due to the clash of colours, both counties lined out in their provincial jerseys, Cork wearing Munster's blue while Galway wore the white of Connacht.

Cork	Galway

Cork Team 1 Dave Creedon 2 Jerry O'Riordan 3 John Lyons 4 Tony O'Shaughnessy 5 Matty Fuohy 6 Derry Hayes 7 Vincy Twomey 8 Joe Twomey 9 Gerald Murphy 10 Willie John Daly 11 Josie Hartnett 12 Christy Ring 13 Tom O'Sullivan 14 Liam Dowling 15 Paddy Barry Substitutes David O'Leary, Mossy O'Connor, Mick Cashman, Jimmy Lynam, Johnny Clifford Trainer Jim Tough Barry Selectors Andy Scannell, Paddy Fox Collins, Jack Barrett, Dinny Barry Murphy, Sean Og Murphy
