= Josie Hartnett =

Irish hurler and Gaelic footballer

Personal information
- Native name: Seosamh Ó Hairtnéid (Irish)
- Nickname: Josie
- Born: 1927 Blackpool, Cork, Ireland
- Died: 18 October 2005 (aged 78) Blackpool, Cork, Ireland
- Occupation: Coach builder
- Height: 5 ft 10 in (178 cm)

Sport
- Sport: Hurling
- Position: Centre-forward
Club
- Years: Club
- 1945-1956: Glen Rovers
Club titles
- Cork titles: 6
Inter-county
| Years | County | Apps (scores) |
| 1948-1956 | Cork | 21 (9–10) |
Inter-county titles
- Munster titles: 4
- All-Irelands: 2
- NHL: 2

Joseph Hartnett (1927 – 18 October 2005) was an Irish hurler and Gaelic footballer, who usually played as a centre-forward, and is best known as a dual player with the Cork senior teams.
