= Mickey Burke (hurler) =

Irish hurler

Personal information
- Native name: Mícheál de Búrca (Irish)
- Born: 1927 Castlegar, County Galway, Ireland
- Died: 19 November 1994 (aged 67) Oranmore, County Galway, Ireland
- Height: 5 ft 9 in (175 cm)

Sport
- Sport: Hurling
- Position: Right wing-back
Club
- Years: Club
- 1940s-1950s: Castlegar
Club titles
- Galway titles: 2
Inter-county
- Years: County
- 1940s-1950s: Galway
Inter-county titles
- All-Irelands: 0
- NHL: 1

Michael Burke (1927 – 19 November 1994) was an Irish sportsperson. He played hurling with his local club Castlegar and was a member of the Galway senior inter-county team in the 1940s and 1950s.
