= 1953 All-Ireland Senior Hurling Championship =

Championship details
- Dates: 3 May – 7 September 1953
- Teams: 13

All-Ireland champions
- Winning team: Cork (18th win)
- Captain: Christy Ring

All-Ireland Finalists
- Losing team: Galway
- Captain: Mickey Burke

Provincial champions
- Munster: Cork
- Leinster: Kilkenny
- Ulster: Not Played
- Connacht: Not Played

Championship statistics
- No. matches played: 13
- Goals total: 75 (5.7 per game)
- Points total: 201 (15.4 per game)
- Top Scorer: Jimmy Smyth (7–5); Jim Langton (1–23)
- All-Star Team: See here

The 1953 All-Ireland Senior Hurling Championship was the 67th staging of the All-Ireland hurling championship since its establishment by the Gaelic Athletic Association in 1887. The championship began on 3 May 1953 and ended on 7 September 1953.

Cork were the defending champions, and retained their All-Ireland crown following a 3–3 to 0–8 defeat of Galway in the final.

== Teams ==
=== Team summaries ===
| Team | Colours | Most recent success | | |
| Team | Colours | All-Ireland | Provincial | League |
|---|---|---|---|---|
| Clare | Saffron and blue | 1914 | 1932 | 1945–46 |
| Cork | Red and white | 1952 | 1952 | 1952–53 |
| Dublin | Navy and blue | 1938 | 1952 | 1938–39 |
| Galway | Maroon and white | 1923 | 1922 | 1950–51 |
| Kilkenny | Black and amber | 1947 | 1950 | 1932–33 |
| Laois | Blue and white | 1915 | 1949 | |
| Limerick | Green and white | 1940 | 1940 | 1946–47 |
| Meath | Green and gold | | | |
| Offaly | Green, white and gold | | | |
| Tipperary | Blue and gold | 1951 | 1951 | 1951–52 |
| Waterford | Blue and white | 1948 | 1948 | |
| Westmeath | Maroon and white | | | |
| Wexford | Purple and gold | 1910 | 1951 | |

== Provincial championships ==
=== Leinster Senior Hurling Championship ===
First round

| 3 May 1953 First round | Westmeath | 2–04 – 3–13 | Meath | Cusack Park, Mullingar |
| | J McGrath 1–2, D Callaghan 1–0, F Farrell 0–1, T Daly 0–1. | | B Smyth 0–7, W Rispin 1–1, R Weldon 1–0, T Kelly 1–0, J Dempsey 0–2, T Walsh 0–1, M Regan 0–1, A Foran 0–1. |

Second round

| 3 May 1953 Second round | Offaly | 2–04 – 5–15 | Laois | St. Brendan's Park, Birr |
| | J Spain 1–2, T Dooley 1–0, W Mitchell 0–1, T Mitchell 0–1. | | H Grey 1–5, P Lalor 2–0, T Maher 1–2, P Kelly 1–1, J Styles 0–4, D Murray 0–2, L Harding 0–1. |

| 17 May 1953 Second round | Kilkenny | 3–09 – 3–01 | Meath | O'Connor Park, Tullamore |
| | P Johnston 1–3, D Carroll 0–5, T Ryan 1–0, D Kennedy 1–0, J Langton 0–1. | | W Rispin 2–0, R Weldon 1–0, B Smyth 0–1. | Referee: P Connell (Offaly) |

Semi-finals

| 14 June 1953 Semi-final | Wexford | 4–13 – 3–05 | Laois | Nowlan Park, Kilkenny |
| | T Flood 2–6, Padge Kehoe 0–4, N Rackard 1–0, Cummins 1–0, M Flood 0–1, S Flood 0–1, Paddy Kehoe 0–1. | | H Grey 2–2, J Styles 0–2, P Lalor 1–0, P Kelly 0–1. | Referee: P Connell (Offaly) |

| 21 June 1953 Semi-final | Dublin | 4–08 – 3–11 | Kilkenny | Croke Park, Dublin |
| | J Prior 2–2, K Heffernan 2–0, N Allen 0–3, L Donnelly 0–1, G Kelly 0–1, S Óg Ó Ceallacháin 0–1. | | J Langton 1–6, S Downey 1–3, D Kennedy 0–1, S Clohessy 0–1. | Attendance: 14,829; Referee: P Connell (Offaly) |

| 5 July 1953 Semi-final replay | Kilkenny | 2–13 – 1–05 | Dublin | Nowlan Park, Kilkenny |
| | J Langton 0–6, S Downey 1–1, D Carroll 0–4, P Buggy 1–0, D Kennedy 0–2. | | K Heffernan 1–0, N Allen 0–3, C Murphy 0–1, L Healy 0–1. | Attendance: 22,239; Referee: A Donnelly (Meath) |

Final

| 19 July 1953 Final | Kilkenny | 1–13 – 3–05 | Wexford | Croke Park, Dublin |
| | J Langton 0–6, D Kennedy 0–2, M Kelly 1–1, J Sutton 0–2, S Downey 0–1, S Clohessy 0–1. | | N Rackard 2–3, Padge Kehoe 1–0, T Flood 0–2. | Attendance: 37,533; Referee: P Connell (Offaly) |

=== Munster Senior Hurling Championship ===
First round

| 14 June 1953 First round | Clare | 10–08 – 1–01 | Limerick | Cusack Park, Ennis |
| | J Smyth 6–4, P Greene 2–0, J Purcell 1–0, M Considine 1–0, M Nugent 0–3, J Meaney 0–1, | | D Kelly 1–0, T McNamara 0–1. | Referee: S Vaughan (Waterford) |

Semi-finals

| 21 June 1953 Semi-final | Tipperary | 6–03 – 2–10 | Waterford | Cork Athletic Grounds, Cork |
| | P Maher 2–0, P Kenny 1–3, N Ryan 1–0, PJ O'Brien 1–0, S Bannon 1–0, P Shanahan 0–1. | | J Kiely 1–7, J Fives 1–1, P Grimes 0–1, W Doocey 0–1. |

| 28 June 1953 Semi-final | Cork | 2–11 – 4–02 | Clare | Gaelic Grounds, Limerick |
| | J Hartnett 2–1, C Ring 0–5, WJ Daly 0–2, P Barry 0–1, M Fouhy 0–1, L Dowling 0–1. | | P Greene 3–1, J Smith 1–1. | Referee: S Vaughan (Waterford) |

Final

| 26 July 1953 Final | Cork | 3–10 – 1–11 | Tipperary | Gaelic Grounds, Limerick |
| | C Ring 1–8, J Hartnett 1–1, L Dowling 1–0, G Murphy 0–1. | | Shanahan 0–8, Stakelum 1–1, S Bannon 0–2. | Attendance: 46,265; Referee: W O'Donoghue (Limerick) |

== All-Ireland Senior Hurling Championship ==
=== All-Ireland semi-finals ===
| 16 August 1953 Semi-final | Galway | 3–05 – 1–10 | Kilkenny | Croke Park, Dublin |
| | J Killeen 2–0, J Gallagher 1–3, J Molloy 0–1, H Gordon 0–1. | | S Downey 1–2, J Langton 0–4, J Sutton 0–2, P Buggy 0–1, D Kennedy 0–1. | Attendance: 38,690; Referee: R Stakelum (Tipperary) |

=== All-Ireland final ===
| 7 September 1953 Final | Cork | 3–03 – 0–08 | Galway | Croke Park, Dublin |
| | C Ring 1–1, J Hartnett 1–0, T O'Sullivan 1–0, P Barry 0–1, WJ Daly 0–1. | | B Duffy 0–2, J Molloy 0–2, J Duggan 0–1, J Gallagher 0–1, H Gordon 0–1, J Killeen 0–1. | Attendance: 71,195; Referee: P Connell (Offaly) |

== Championship statistics ==
=== Top scorers ===
Top scorers overall

| Rank | Player | Club | Tally | Total | Matches | Average |
|---|---|---|---|---|---|---|
| 1 | Jimmy Smyth | Clare | 7-05 | 26 | 2 | 13.00 |
| 1 | Jim Langton | Kilkenny | 1–23 | 26 | 5 | 5.20 |
| 2 | Christy Ring | Cork | 2–14 | 20 | 3 | 6.66 |
| 3 | Patrick Greene | Clare | 5-01 | 16 | 2 | 8.00 |
| 3 | Harry Gray | Laois | 3-07 | 16 | 2 | 8.00 |
| 3 | Shem Downey | Kilkenny | 3-07 | 16 | 5 | 3.20 |
| 4 | Josie Hartnett | Cork | 4-02 | 14 | 3 | 4.66 |
| 4 | Tim Flood | Wexford | 2-08 | 14 | 2 | 7.00 |
| 5 | Nicky Rackard | Wexford | 3-03 | 12 | 2 | 6.00 |
| 6 | Willie Rispin | Meath | 3-01 | 10 | 2 | 5.00 |
| 6 | John Kiely | Waterford | 1-07 | 10 | 1 | 10.00 |

Top scorers in a single game

| Rank | Player | Club | Tally | Total | Opposition |
|---|---|---|---|---|---|
| 1 | Jimmy Smyth | Clare | 6-04 | 22 | Limerick |
| 2 | Tim Flood | Wexford | 2-06 | 12 | Laois |
| 3 | Christy Ring | Cork | 1-08 | 11 | Tipperary |
| 4 | Patrick Greene | Clare | 3-01 | 10 | Cork |
| 4 | John Kiely | Waterford | 1-07 | 10 | Tipperary |
| 5 | Nicky Rackard | Wexford | 2-03 | 9 | Kilkenny |
| 5 | Jim Langton | Kilkenny | 1-06 | 9 | Dublin |
| 6 | Harry Gray | Laois | 2-02 | 8 | Wexford |
| 6 | Jim Prior | Dublin | 2-02 | 8 | Kilkenny |
| 6 | Harry Gray | Laois | 1-05 | 8 | Offaly |

=== Scoring ===
- Widest winning margin: 34 points
  - Clare 10–8 – 1–1 Limerick (Munster quarter-final, 14 June 1953)
- Most goals in a match: 11
  - Clare 10–8 – 1–1 Limerick (Munster quarter-final, 14 June 1953)
- Most points in a match: 21
  - Cork 3–10 – 1–11 Tipperary (Munster final, 26 July 1953)
- Most goals by one team in a match: 10
  - Clare 10–8 – 1–1 Limerick (Munster quarter-final, 14 June 1953)
- Most goals scored by a losing team: 4
  - Clare 4–2 – 2–11 Cork (Munster semi-final, 28 June 1953)
- Most points scored by a losing team: 11
  - Tipperary 1–11 – 3–10 Cork (Munster final, 26 July 1953)

=== Miscellaneous ===
- Clare's 10–8 to 1–1 defeat of Limerick in the Munster quarter-final was a record-breaking game. It was Clare's first championship defeat of their near rivals since 1914. The 34-point winning margin remains a record between these two teams. Jimmy Smyth of Clare scored a Munster championship record of 6–4 against Limerick.

== Sources ==
- Corry, Eoghan, The GAA Book of Lists (Hodder Headline Ireland, 2005).
- Donegan, Des, The Complete Handbook of Gaelic Games (DBA Publications Limited, 2005).
- Horgan, Tim, Christy Ring: Hurling's Greatest (The Collins Press, 2007).
- Nolan, Pat, Flashbacks: A Half Century of Cork Hurling (The Collins Press, 2000).
- Sweeney, Éamonn, Munster Hurling Legends (The O'Brien Press, 2002).
