= 1956 All-Ireland Senior Hurling Championship =

Championship details
- Dates: 22 April – 23 September 1956
- Teams: 13

All-Ireland champions
- Winning team: Wexford (3rd win)
- Captain: Jim English

All-Ireland Finalists
- Losing team: Cork
- Captain: Tony O'Shaughnessy

Provincial champions
- Munster: Cork
- Leinster: Wexford
- Ulster: Not Played
- Connacht: Not Played

Championship statistics
- No. matches played: 12
- Goals total: 85 (7.08 per game)
- Points total: 199 (16.58 per game)
- Top Scorer: Nicky Rackard (12–15)
- All-Star Team: See here

The 1956 All-Ireland Senior Hurling Championship was the 70th staging of the All-Ireland hurling championship since its establishment by the Gaelic Athletic Association in 1887. The championship began on 22 April 1956 and ended on 23 September 1956.

Wexford were the defending champions, and retained their All-Ireland crown following a 2–14 to 2–8 defeat of Cork.

== Teams ==
A total of thirteen teams contested the championship, a reduction of one on the previous championship. Wicklow withdrew and did not field a team in the Leinster Senior Hurling Championship.

=== Team summaries ===
Team	Colours	Most recent success		
Team	Colours	All-Ireland	Provincial	League
Clare	Saffron and blue	1914	1932	1945–46
Cork	Red and white	1954	1954	1952–53
Dublin	Blue and navy	1938	1952	1938–39
Galway	Maroon and white	1923		1950–51
Kilkenny	Black and amber	1947	1953	1932–33
Laois	Blue and white	1915	1949	
Limerick	Green and white	1940	1940	1946–47
Meath	Green and gold			
Offaly	Green, white and gold			
Tipperary	Blue and gold	1951	1951	1954–55
Waterford	White and blue	1948	1948	
Westmeath	Maroon and white			
Wexford	Purple and gold	1955	1955	1955–56

== Provincial championships ==
=== Leinster Senior Hurling Championship ===
First round

29 April 1956 First round	Westmeath	9–06 – 6–01	Meath	O'Connor Park
	J Daly 3–2, D O'Callaghan 3–0, S Stokes 2–1, D O'Sullivan 1–0, J McGrath 0–2, J Carey 0–1.		B Smith 2–0, M Kane 1–1, S O'Brien 1–0, W McGovern 1–0, M Cullen 1–0.	Referee: P O'Connell (Offaly)

Quarter-finals

22 April 1956 Quarter-final	Laois	5–09 – 4–05	Offaly	O'Moore Park
	P Spencer 1–4, T Maher 1–1, B O'Keeffe 1–0, P Lalor 1–0, M O'Sullivan 1–0, B Bohane 0–3, J Kelly 0–1.		T Dooley 1–1, B McDermott 1–0, T Errity 1–0, A Pyke 1–0, J Brady 0–2, D Breen 0–1, S Grennan 0–1.	Referee: J Mulcahy (Kilkenny)

20 May 1956 Quarter-final	Kilkenny	6–11 – 3–09	Westmeath	O'Connor Park
	S Clohessey 0–9, W Dwyer 2–0, D Rockett 2–0, J Murphy 1–1, PJ Garvan 1–1.		J McGrath 0–4, D O'Callaghan 1–0, J Daly 1–0, D O'Sullivan 1–0, S Stokes 0–3, J Carey 0–2.	Attendance: 12,000; Referee: P O'Connell (Offaly)

Semi-finals

10 June 1956 Semi-final	Wexford	8–09 – 2–02	Laois	Nowlan Park
	N Rackard 4–3, N Wheeler 2–0, T Dixon 1–2, T Flood 1–1, J Morrissey 0–2, O Gough 0–1.		T Maher 1–2, M O'Sullivan 1–0.	Attendance: 20,000; Referee: J Mulcahy (Kilkenny)

17 June 1956 Semi-final	Kilkenny	3–08 – 1–08	Dublin	Nowlan Park
	S Clohessey 2–2, W Dwyer 1–1, R Carroll 0–4, PJ Garvan 0–1.		W Cashin 1–3, N Allen 0–4, B Boothman 0–1.	Attendance: 20,000; Referee: P O'Connell

Final

8 July 1956 Final	Wexford	4–08 – 3–10	Kilkenny	Croke Park
	N Rackard 2–3, T Ryan 1–1, T Dixon 1–1, P Kehoe 0–3.		W Dwyer 1–4, D Rockett 2–0, J Murphy 0–3, S Clohessey 0–1, B Walsh 0–1, M Brophy 0–1.	Attendance: 52,077; Referee: M Spain (Offaly)

=== Munster Senior Hurling Championship ===
Quarter-final

10 June 1956 Quarter-final	Cork	5–09 – 2–12	Waterford	FitzGerald Park
	M Ryan 2–2, C Ring 2–1, P Barry 1–0, M Finn 0–2, M Fouhy 0–1, T Kelly 0–1, WJ Daly 0–1, C O'Shea 0–1.		D Whelan 2–0, M Flannelly 0–4, T Cheasty 0–3, J Kiely 0–2, S Power 0–1, F Walsh 0–1, P Grimes 0–1.	Attendance: 18,500; Referee: G Fitzgerald (Limerick)

Semi-finals

17 June 1956 Semi-final	Limerick	1–15 – 2–06	Clare	Thurles Sportsfield
	M Tynan 1–1, R Prendergast 0–4, D Kelly 0–4, V Cobbe 0–2, L Ryan 0–1, T Casey 0–1, G Fitzgerald 0–1, M McInerney 0–1.		J Smyth 1–2, S Madigan 1–0, M Nugent 0–3, G Ryan 0–1.	Attendance: 24,030; Referee: R Stakelum (Tipperary)

1 July 1956 Semi-final	Cork	1–11 – 2–07	Tipperary	Gaelic Grounds
	C Ring 0–6, P Barry 1–0, T Kelly 0–1, J Rogers 0–1, C O'Shea 0–1, P Healy 0–1, M Fouhy 0–1,		P Kenny 1–3, T Butler 1–1, P Stakelum 0–1, L Devaney 0–1, G Doyle T English 0–1.	Attendance: 36,946; Referee: M Pollard (Waterford)

Final

22 July 1956 Final	Cork	5–05 – 3–05	Limerick	Thurles Sportsfield
	T Kelly 2–2, C Ring 2–1, P Barry 1–0, C O'Shea 0–1, WJ Daly 0–1.		V Cobbe 1–1, T McGarry 1–1, L Ryan 1–0, D Kelly 0–3.	Attendance: 47,017; Referee: R Stakelum (Tipperary)

== All-Ireland Senior Hurling Championship ==
=== All-Ireland semi-finals ===
29 July 1956 Semi-final	Wexford	5–13 – 1–8	Galway	Croke Park
	N Rackard (5–3), English (0–2), W Rackard (0–2), Flood (0–2), Hearne (0–1), Ryan (0–1), Dixon (0–1), Kehoe (0–1).		Salmon (0–4), Fives (1–0), Conway (0–2), Cullinane (0–1), Molloy (0–1).	Attendance: 36,465; Referee: R Stakelum

=== All-Ireland final ===
23 September 1956 Final	Wexford	2–14 – 2–8	Cork	Croke Park
	N Rackard (1–6), Kehoe (1–1), T. Flood (0–2), Codd (0–2), Dixon (0–2), W. Rackard (0–1).		Ring (1–5), Barry (1–1), Regan (0–1) Goulding (0–1).	Attendance: 83,096; Referee: T O'Sullivan (Limerick)

== Championship statistics ==
=== Top scorers ===
Top scorers overall

Rank	Player	Club	Tally	Total	Matches	Average
1	Nicky Rackard	Wexford	12–15	51	4	12.75
2	Christy Ring	Cork	5–13	28	4	7.00
3	Seán Clohessy	Kilkenny	2–12	18	3	6.00
4	Billy Dwyer	Kilkenny	4-05	17	3	5.66
5	Jimmy Daly	Westmeath	4-02	14	2	7.00
6	Paddy Barry	Cork	4-01	13	4	3.25
7	Dinny O'Callaghan	Westmeath	4-00	12	2	6.00
7	Tom Dixon	Wexford	2-06	12	4	3.00

Top scorers in a single game

Rank	Player	Club	Tally	Total	Opposition
1	Nicky Rackard	Wexford	5-03	18	Galway
2	Nicky Rackard	Wexford	4-03	15	Laois
3	Jimmy Daly	Westmeath	3-02	11	Meath
4	Dinny O'Callaghan	Westmeath	3-00	9	Meath
4	Nicky Rackard	Wexford	2-03	9	Kilkenny
4	Nicky Rackard	Wexford	1-06	9	Kilkenny
4	Seán Clohessy	Kilkenny	0-09	9	Westmeath
4	Seán Clohessy	Kilkenny	2-02	8	Dublin
4	Mick Ryan	Cork	2-02	8	Waterford
4	Terry Kelly	Cork	2-02	8	Limerick
4	Christy Ring	Cork	1-05	8	Wexford

=== Scoring ===
- Widest winning margin: 19 points
  - Wexford 8–9 – 2–2 Laois (Leinster semi-final, 10 June 1956)
- Most goals in a match: 15
  - Westmeath 9–6 – 6–1 Meath (Leinster first round, 29 April 1956)
- Most points in a match: 22
  - Wexford 2–14 – 2–8 Cork (All-Ireland final, 23 September 1956)
- Most goals by one team in a match: 9
  - Westmeath 9–6 – 6–1 Meath (Leinster first round, 29 April 1956)
- Most goals scored by a losing team: 6
  - Westmeath 9–6 – 6–1 Meath (Leinster first round, 29 April 1956)
- Most points scored by a losing team: 12
  - Cork 5–9 – 2–12 Waterford (Munster quarter-final, 10 June 1956)

=== Miscellaneous ===
- Wexford won a third Leinster title in-a-row. It remains the only time in their history that they went undefeated in the provincial championship for three successive campaigns.
- An outbreak of polio in Cork and the fear of a spread of the disease to Dublin due to an influx of Cork supporters lead to the postponement of the All-Ireland final until 23 September 1956.
- The attendance of 83,096 at the All-Ireland final remains an all-time record.
- Wexford retained the All-Ireland title for the only time in their history. The 2–14 to 2–8 victory remained their only championship defeat of Cork until July 2016 when they did it again in the round 2 Qualifiers. (Cork–Wexford hurling rivalry)

== Sources ==
- Corry, Eoghan, The GAA Book of Lists (Hodder Headline Ireland, 2005).
- Donegan, Des, The Complete Handbook of Gaelic Games (DBA Publications Limited, 2005).
- Horgan, Tim, Christy Ring: Hurling's Greatest (The Collins Press, 2007).
- Nolan, Pat, Flashbacks: A Half Century of Cork Hurling (The Collins Press, 2000).
- Sweeney, Éamonn, Munster Hurling Legends (The O'Brien Press, 2002).
