= 1954 All-Ireland Senior Hurling Championship =

Championship details
- Dates: 11 April – 5 September 1954
- Teams: 14

All-Ireland champions
- Winning team: Cork (19th win)
- Captain: Christy Ring

All-Ireland Finalists
- Losing team: Wexford
- Captain: Padge Kehoe

Provincial champions
- Munster: Cork
- Leinster: Wexford
- Ulster: Not Played
- Connacht: Not Played

Championship statistics
- No. matches played: 14
- Goals total: 87 (6.2 per game)
- Points total: 183 (13.0 per game)
- Top Scorer: Nicky Rackard (12–19)
- All-Star Team: See here

The 1954 All-Ireland Senior Hurling Championship was the 68th staging of the All-Ireland hurling championship since its establishment by the Gaelic Athletic Association in 1887. The championship began on 11 April 1954 and ended on 5 September 1954.

Cork were the defending champions and retained their title following a 1–9 to 1–6 victory over Wexford in the final.

== Teams ==
A total of fourteen teams contested the championship, an increase of one on the previous championship. Antrim, who last participated at this level in 1949, re-entered the championship in spite of facing no competition in the Ulster Senior Hurling Championship.

=== Team summaries ===
| Team | Colours | Most recent success | | |
| Team | Colours | All-Ireland | Provincial | League |
|---|---|---|---|---|
| Antrim | Saffron and white | | 1946 | |
| Clare | Saffron and blue | 1914 | 1932 | 1945–46 |
| Cork | Red and white | 1953 | 1953 | 1952–53 |
| Dublin | Blue and navy | 1938 | 1952 | 1938–39 |
| Galway | Maroon and white | 1923 | | 1950–51 |
| Kilkenny | Black and amber | 1947 | 1953 | 1932–33 |
| Laois | Blue and white | 1915 | 1949 | |
| Limerick | Green and white | 1940 | 1940 | 1946–47 |
| Meath | Green and gold | | | |
| Offaly | Green, white and gold | | | |
| Tipperary | Blue and gold | 1951 | 1951 | 1953–54 |
| Waterford | White and blue | 1948 | 1948 | |
| Westmeath | Maroon and white | | | |
| Wexford | Purple and gold | 1910 | 1951 | |

== Provincial championships ==
=== Leinster Senior Hurling Championship ===
First round

| 11 April 1954 First round | Offaly | 6–08 – 1–03 | Westmeath | O'Connor Park, Tullamore |
| | Furlong 2–1, Errity 1–3, J Spain 1–1, J Landy 1–0, Loughnane 1–0, Mitchell 0–2, Walsh 0–1. | | Farrell 1–0, Carey 0–1, McGrath 0–1, Aylward 0–1. |

| 11 April 1954 First round | Laois | 1–09 – 1–10 | Meath | O'Moore Park, Portlaoise |
| | N McDonnell 0–1, Hogan 1–3, Styles 0–2, Harding 0–1, O'Hanrahan 0–1, Kelly 0–1. | | B Smyth 1–7, J O'Meara 0–1, Foran 0–1. | Referee: P Connell (Offaly) |

Second round

| 9 May 1954 Second round | Meath | 2–08 – 3–05 | Offaly | Nowlan Park, Kilkenny |
| | F Foran 1–1, A Foran 1–1, B Smyth 0–3, J O'Meara 0–2, S O'Brien 0–1. | | M Furlong 1–1, J Landy 1–1, W Pyke 1–0, T Errity 0–3, | Referee: J Mulcahy (Kilkenny) |

| 30 May 1954 Second round replay | Meath | 3–06 – 3–04 | Offaly | O'Moore Park, Portlaoise |
| | B Smyth 1–1, F Foran 1–1, Rispin 1–0, A O'Halloran 0–2, S O'Brien 0–1, M Regan 0–1. | | Dooley 2–2, M Furlong 1–1, E O'Brien 1–0, T Errity 0–1. | Referee: J Howard |

Semi-finals

| 6 June 1954 Semi-final | Wexford | 5–11 – 0–07 | Kilkenny | Croke Park, Dublin |
| | T Flood 2–3, N Rackard 0–5, Padge Kehoe 1–1, D Ahearne 1–1, J Morrissey 1–0, N Wheeler 0–1. | | D Carroll 0–6, J Carroll 0–1. | Attendance: 17,785; Referee: P Connell (Offaly) |

| 20 June 1954 Semi-final | Dublin | 3–08 – 2–04 | Meath | Croke Park, Dublin |
| | Daly 2–0, N Allen 1–2, Herbert 0–4, Ryan 0–2, | | Rispin 2–0, Smyth 0–2, O'Halloran 0–1, O'Meara 0–1. | Attendance: 8,839; Referee: J Mulcahy (Kilkenny) |

Final

| 18 July 1954 Final | Wexford | 8–05 – 1–04 | Dublin | Nowlan Park, Kilkenny |
| | N Rackard 5–4, Padge Kehoe 1–0, T Flood 1–0, B Donovan 1–0, S Hearne 0–1. | | P Shanahan 1–0, Herbert 0–2, N Allen 0–1, S Daly 0–1. | Attendance: 28,592 |

First round
Meath | 1–10
Laois | 1–9
Offaly | 6–8
Westmeath | 1–3

Second round
Meath (R) | 2–8; 3–6
Offaly (R) | 3–5; 3–4

Semi-finals
Wexford | 5–11
Kilkenny | 0–7
Dublin | 3–8
Meath | 2–4

Leinster final
Wexford | 8–5
Dublin | 1–4

=== Munster Senior Hurling Championship ===
First round

| 13 June 1954 First round | Waterford | 4–03 – 0–01 | Limerick | Thurles Sportsfield |
| | Doyle 2–0, S Power 1–1, D Whelan 1–1, M Flannelly 0–1. | | S Leonard 0–1. | Attendance: 14,000; Referee: C Conway |

Semi-finals

| 20 June 1954 Semi-final | Tipperary | 5–06 – 3–03 | Clare | Gaelic Grounds, Limerick |
| | N Ryan 2–2, P Kenny 1–3, S Bannon 1–1, M Seymour 1–0. | | J Smyth 1–3, N Jordan 1–0, J Greene 1–0. | Attendance: 15,000; Referee: W O'Donoghue (Limerick) |

| 27 June 1954 Semi-final | Cork | 7–08 – 4–05 | Waterford | Thurles Sportsfield, Thurles |
| | C Ring 1–4, P Barry 2–0, J Clifford 1–1, WJ Daly 1–0, J Hartnett 1–0, É Goulding 0–2. | | S Power 4–2, Own scores 1–1, P Doyle 1–0, M Flannelly 0–3. | Attendance: 19,883; Referee: W O'Donoghue (Limerick) |

Final

| 18 July 1954 Final | Cork | 2–08 – 1–08 | Tipperary | Gaelic Grounds |
| | C Ring 1–5, P Barry 1–0, J Clifford 0–3. | | P Kenny 0–5, Seymour 1–0, Bannon 0–1, Ryan 0–1, Hough 0–1. | Attendance: 50,071; Referee: W O'Donoghue (Limerick) |

Quarter-final
Limerick | 0–1
Waterford | 4–3

Semi-finals
Tipperary | 5–6
Clare | 3–3
Cork | 7–8
Waterford | 4–5

Munster final
Tipperary | 1–8
Cork | 2–8

== All-Ireland Senior Hurling Championship ==
=== All-Ireland semi-finals ===
| 8 August 1954 Semi-final | Wexford | 12–17 – 2–03 | Antrim | Croke Park, Dublin |
| | N Rackard 7–7, T Flood 3–0, Paddy Kehoe 1–2, Padge Kehoe 1–3, O'Donovan 0–2, J Morrissey 0–2, S Hearne 0–1. | | P McManus 1–0, S Mulholland 1–0, B McDonald 0–2, C Lynn 0–1. | Attendance: 35,744; Referee: J Langton (Kilkenny) |

| 8 August 1954 Semi-final | Cork | 4–13 – 2–01 | Galway | Croke Park, Dublin |
| | WJ Daly 1–3, J Hartnett 1–2, É Goulding 1–1, C Ring 0–4, J Clifford 1–0, P Barry 0–1, G Murphy 0–1, W Moore 0–1. | | M McInerney 1–0, E Monaghan 1–0, P Duggan 0–1. | Attendance: 35,744; Referee: J Mulcahy (Kilkenny) |

=== All-Ireland final ===
| 5 September 1954 Final | Cork | 1–09 – 1–06 | Wexford | Croke Park, Dublin |
| | C Ring 0–5, J Clifford 1–0, É Goulding 0–1, WJ Daly 0–1, V Twomey 0–1, J Hartnett 0–1. | | T Ryan 1–0, N Rackard 0–3, T Flood, 0–2, P Kehoe 0–1. | Attendance: 84,856; Referee: J Mulcahy (Kilkenny) |

== Championship statistics ==
=== Top scorers ===
Top scorers overall

| Rank | Player | Club | Tally | Total | Matches | Average |
|---|---|---|---|---|---|---|
| 1 | Nicky Rackard | Wexford | 12–19 | 55 | 4 | 13.75 |
| 2 | Christy Ring | Cork | 2–18 | 24 | 4 | 6.00 |
| 3 | Tim Flood | Wexford | 6-05 | 23 | 4 | 5.75 |
| 4 | Brian Smyth | Meath | 2–13 | 19 | 4 | 4.75 |
| 5 | Séamus Power | Waterford | 5-03 | 18 | 2 | 9.00 |
| 6 | Mickey Furlong | Offaly | 4-03 | 15 | 3 | 5.00 |
| 7 | Padge Kehoe | Wexford | 3-05 | 14 | 4 | 3.50 |
| 8 | Johnny Clifford | Cork | 3-04 | 13 | 4 | 3.75 |
| 9 | Paddy Kenny | Tipperary | 1-08 | 11 | 2 | 5.50 |
| 10 | Paddy Barry | Cork | 3-01 | 10 | 4 | 2.50 |
| 10 | Willie John Daly | Cork | 2-04 | 10 | 4 | 2.50 |
| 10 | Tommy Errity | Offaly | 1-07 | 10 | 3 | 3.33 |

Top scorers in a single game

| Rank | Player | Club | Tally | Total | Opposition |
|---|---|---|---|---|---|
| 1 | Nicky Rackard | Wexford | 7-07 | 28 | Antrim |
| 2 | Nicky Rackard | Wexford | 5-04 | 19 | Dublin |
| 3 | Séamus Power | Waterford | 4-02 | 14 | Cork |
| 4 | Brian Smyth | Meath | 1-07 | 10 | Laois |
| 5 | Tim Flood | Wexford | 3-00 | 9 | Antrim |
| 5 | Tim Flood | Wexford | 2-03 | 9 | Kilkenny |
| 6 | Ned Ryan | Tipperary | 2-02 | 8 | Clare |
| 6 | Tom Dooley | Offaly | 2-02 | 8 | Meath |
| 6 | Christy Ring | Cork | 1-05 | 8 | Tipperary |
| 7 | Mickey Furlong | Offaly | 2-01 | 7 | Westmeath |
| 7 | Christy Ring | Cork | 1-04 | 7 | Waterford |

=== Scoring ===
- Widest winning margin: 44 points
  - Wexford 12–17 : 2–3 Antrim (All-Ireland semi-final)
- Most goals in a match: 14
  - Wexford 12–17 : 2–3 Antrim (All-Ireland semi-final)
- Most points in a match: 20
  - Wexford 12–17 : 2–3 Antrim (All-Ireland semi-final)
- Most goals by one team in a match: 12
  - Wexford 12–17 : 2–3 Antrim (All-Ireland semi-final)
- Most goals scored by a losing team: 4
  - Waterford 4–5 : 7–8 Cork (Munster semi-final)
- Most points scored by a losing team: 9
  - Laois 1–9 : 1–10 Meath (Leinster first round)

=== Miscellaneous ===
- Meath qualified for the Leinster semi-finals for the first time in the history of the championship.
- Antrim took part in the All-Ireland semi-finals for the first time since 1949. It was their last game at this stage of the championship until re-entering the championship in 1984.
- Wexford's Nicky Rackard scores 7–7 in their All-Ireland semi-final meeting with Antrim. It is believed to be a record score for an All-Ireland semi-final.
- Cork's Christy Ring wins a record-breaking eighth All-Ireland medal as Cork claim a third successive championship for the third time in their history.

== Roll of Honour ==
- Cork – 19 (1954)
- Tipperary – 16 (1951)
- Kilkenny – 13 (1947)
- Limerick – 6 (1940)
- Dublin – 6 (1938)
- Waterford – 1 (1948)
- Galway – 1 (1923)
- Laois – 1 (1915)
- Clare – 1 (1914)
- Wexford – 1 (1910)
- London – 1 (1901)
- Kerry – 1 (1891)

== Player facts ==
=== Debutantes ===
The following players made their début in the 1954 championship:

| Player | Team | Date | Opposition | Game |
|---|---|---|---|---|
| Peter Darby | Meath | April 11 | Laois | Leinster first round |
| Mick Cashman | Cork | June 27 | Waterford | Munster semi-final |
| Johnny Clifford | Cork | June 27 | Waterford | Munster semi-final |
| Éamonn Goulding | Cork | June 27 | Waterford | Munster semi-final |

=== Retirees ===
The following players played their last game in the 1954 championship:

| Player | Team | Last Game | Date | Opposition | Début |
|---|---|---|---|---|---|
| Tom O'Sullivan | Cork | Munster final | July 18 | Tipperary | 1953 |

== Sources ==
- Corry, Eoghan, The GAA Book of Lists (Hodder Headline Ireland, 2005).
- Donegan, Des, The Complete Handbook of Gaelic Games (DBA Publications Limited, 2005).
- Horgan, Tim, Christy Ring: Hurling's Greatest (The Collins Press, 2007).
- Nolan, Pat, Flashbacks: A Half Century of Cork Hurling (The Collins Press, 2000).
- Sweeney, Éamonn, Munster HUrling Legends (The O'Brien Press, 2002).
