= Dan Moylan =

Irish hurler

Personal information
- Native name: Dónall Ó Maoileáin (Irish)
- Nickname: Cooper
- Born: Daniel Joseph Moylan; 22 November 1915 Dillon's Cross, Cork, Ireland
- Died: 20 February 1992 (aged 76) Wellington Road, Cork, Ireland
- Occupation: Shop assistant

Sport
- Sport: Hurling
- Position: Right corner-forward
Club
- Years: Club
- Glen Rovers
Club titles
	Football	Hurling
Cork titles	2	7
Inter-county
Years	County	Apps (scores)
1938-1940	Cork	7 (5-02)
Inter-county titles
- Munster titles: 1
- All-Irelands: 0
- NHL: 2

Daniel Joseph Moylan (22 November 1915 – 20 February 1992), known as Cooper Moylan, was an Irish hurler who played for Cork Senior Championship club Glen Rovers. He was also a member of the Cork senior hurling team at various times and usually lined out as a forward.

== Career ==
Moylan first came to prominence as a hurler during his schooldays at the North Monastery. He was on "the Mon" Harty Cup-winning teams in 1934 and 1935. At club level Moylan was one of the stalwarts of the Glen Rovers team and won seven consecutive County Senior Championship titles. He also enjoyed championship success with the St. Nicholas' club as a Gaelic footballer. After an unsuccessful one-year tenure with the Cork minor hurling team in 1933, Moylan joined the senior team in 1938. His three seasons with the team saw him win two National League titles and a Munster Championship medal as a reserve. Moylan was also a non-playing reserve when Cork were beaten by Kilkenny in the 1939 All-Ireland final.

== Personal life and death ==
Moylan was born in Dillon's Cross, Cork, the third child of Edward and Agnes Moylan (née King). The son of a waiter, he later worked as a shop assistant. Moylan married Esther Byrne in November 1943 and had four children.

Moylan died after a period of illness at Marymount Hospice in Cork on 20 February 1992.

== Honours ==
North Monastery

- Dr. Harty Cup: 1934, 1935

Glen Rovers

- Cork Senior Hurling Championship: 1935, 1936, 1937, 1938, 1939, 1940, 1941

St. Nicholas

- Cork Senior Football Championship: 1938, 1941
- Cork Intermediate Football Championship: 1937

Cork

- Munster Senior Hurling Championship: 1939
- National Hurling League: 1938-39, 1939-40
