= Danny Matt Dorgan =

Irish hurler

Personal information
- Native name: Dónall Ó Deargáin (Irish)
- Nickname: Danny Matt
- Born: Daniel Matthew Dorgan; 12 October 1906 York Street, Cork, Ireland
- Died: 17 June 1956 (aged 49) Old Blackrock Road, Cork, Ireland
- Occupation: Labourer

Sport
- Sport: Hurling
- Position: Full-back
Club
- Years: Club
- 1925–1941: Glen Rovers
Club titles
	Football	Hurling
Cork titles	1	8
Inter-county*
Years	County	Apps (scores)
1934–1939	Cork	2 (0-00)
Inter-county titles
- Munster titles: 1
- All-Irelands: 0
- NHL: 1
- *Inter County team apps and scores correct as of 23:05, 1 May 2019.

Daniel Matthew Dorgan (12 October 1906 – 17 June 1956) was an Irish hurler who played for Cork Senior Championship club Glen Rovers. He was a member of the Cork senior hurling team at various times over a five-year period, during which time he usually lined out as a full-back.

== Career ==
Dorgan first came to prominence as a member of the Glen Rovers club. After winning a County Intermediate Championship title in 1925, he went on to become one of the stalwart defenders on the team that won a record eight County Senior Championship titles before a long-term injury ended his career in 1941. He also enjoyed championship success with the St. Nicholas' club as a Gaelic footballer. Success at club level also saw Dorgan earn selection with the Cork senior hurling team. After joining the team as a member of the reserves in 1934, he became first-choice full-back for the 1936 Munster Championship but was later dropped from the team. Dorgan was recalled in 1939 and won National League and Munster Championship titles as a reserve. He was also a non-playing reserve when Cork were beaten by Kilkenny in the 1939 All-Ireland final.

== Personal life and death ==
Dorgan was born in York Street, Cork, the fifth child of Daniel and Mary Dorgan (née Howe). The son of a pig dealer, he later worked as a labourer. His younger brother, P. J. Dorgan, also lined out with Cork. Dorgan married Josephine Meehan in September 1939 and had four children.

Dorgan died from cancer at the South Infirmary on 17 June 1956.

== Honours ==
Glen Rovers

- Cork Senior Hurling Championship: 1934, 1935, 1936, 1937, 1938, 1939, 1940, 1941
- Cork Intermediate Hurling Championship: 1925

St. Nicholas

- Cork Senior Football Championship: 1938
- Cork Intermediate Football Championship: 1937

Cork

- Munster Senior Hurling Championship: 1939
- National Hurling League: 1938–39
