= 1938 Cork Senior Hurling Championship =

Annual hurling competition season

- Dates: 13 March 1938 – 16 October 1938
- Champions: Glen Rovers (5th title); Josa Lee (captain)
- Runners-up: Midleton

Tournament statistics
- Matches played: 13
- Goals scored: 112 (8.62 per match)
- Points scored: 86 (6.62 per match)

The 1938 Cork Senior Hurling Championship was the 50th staging of the Cork Senior Hurling Championship since its establishment by the Cork County Board in 1887. The draw for the opening round fixtures took place at the Cork Convention on 30 January 1938. The championship began on 13 March 1938 and ended on 16 October 1938.

Glen Rovers were the defending champions.

On 16 October 1938, Glen Rovers won the championship following a 5–06 to 1–03 defeat of Midleton in the final. This was their fifth championship title and the fifth of eight successive championships.

== Results ==
=== Divisional section ===
13 March 1938 First round	Carrigdhoun	3-06 - 7-01	Seandún	Douglas Sportsfield, Cork

20 March 1938 First round	Muskerry	3-06 - 2-00	Carbery	Bandon Sportsfield, Bandon

3 April 1938 Second round	Avondhu	2-02 - 4-02	Seandún	Mallow Town Park, Mallow

10 April 1938 Final	Muskerry	5-01 - 1-01	Seandún	Cork Athletic Grounds, Cork

=== First round ===
1 May 1938 First round	Muskerry	2-02 - 2-02	Blackrock	Coachford Sportsfield, Coachford

8 May 1938 First round	St. Finbarr's	4-03 - 6-03	Carrigtwohill	Midleton Sportsfield, Midleton

15 May 1938 First round	Midleton	7-04 - 4-01	St. Anne's	Riverstown Sportsfield, Sallybrook

26 June 1938 First round replay	Muskerry	4-02 - 9-00	Blackrock	Coachford Sportsfield, Coachford

21 August 1938 First round	Ballincollig	4-02 - 11-04	Glen Rovers	The Mardyke, Cork

=== Second round ===
28 August 1938 Second round	Blackrock	5-06 - 2-07	Carrigtwohill	Cork Athletic Grounds, Cork

=== Semi-finals ===
11 September 1938 Semi-final	Sarsfields	5-07 - 7-04	Midleton	Fermoy Sportsfield, Fermoy

25 September 1938 Semi-final	Glen Rovers	6-05 - 1-06	Blackrock	The Mardyke, Cork

=== Final ===
16 October 1938 Final	Glen Rovers	5-06 - 1-03	Midleton	Cork Athletic Grounds, Cork
	C Tobin 3-1; W Hyland 1-0; D Moylan 1-0; J Buckley 0-2; W Hickey 0-2; J Lynch 0-1.		W Campbell 1-2; J Crowley 0-1.

== Championship statistics ==
=== Miscellaneous ===
- Glen Rovers set a new record by becoming the first team to win five successive championship titles.
- Josa Lee sets a new record by becoming the first, and to date only, man to captain a team to five championship titles.
- Midleton qualify for the final for the first time since 1917.
- Glen Rovers sister club St. Nicholas' also won the Cork Football Championship. The following players completed the double: Paddy O'Donovan, Danny Matt Dorgan, Jack Lynch, Connie Buckley, Dan Moylan, Charlie Tobin and Tim Kiely.
