= 1993 Cork Intermediate Football Championship =

Gaelic football competition

- Dates: 9 May - 26 September 1993
- Teams: 22
- Champions: Bantry Blues (6th title); Mark O'Connor (captain)
- Runners-up: Ballincollig; Paul Coomey (captain)

Tournament statistics
- Matches played: 25
- Goals scored: 53 (2.12 per match)
- Points scored: 453 (18.12 per match)
- Top scorer(s): Kevin Harrington (4-30)

The 1993 Cork Intermediate Football Championship was the 58th staging of the Cork Intermediate Football Championship since its establishment by the Cork County Board in 1909. The draw for the opening round fixtures took place on 13 December 1992.

The final was played on 26 September 1993 at Sam Maguire Park in Dunmanway, between Bantry Blues and Ballincollig, in what was their first ever meeting in a final. Bantry Blues won the match by 0-12 o 0-10 to claim their sixth championship title overall and a first title in 18 years.

Bantry's Kevin Harrington was the championship's top scorer with 4-30.

== Results ==
=== First round ===
| 9 May 1993 First round | St. Finbarr's | 1-06 - 0-06 | Kilshannig | Páirc Eoin Mhic Cárthaigh |
| | J O'Donoghue 0-4, R Lehane 1-0, K Nagle 0-1, F O'Mahony 0-1. | | W O'Riordan 0-4, E O'Sullivan 0-1, M Fitzpatrick 0-1. |

| 15 May 1993 First round | Carrigaline | 1-07 - 1-07 | Newcestown | Páirc Uí Riagáin |
| | P Healy 1-2, M Plunkett 0-2, O Conlon 0-1, G Walsh 0-1, T Sutton 0-1. | | M O'Mahony 0-4, T Buckley 1-0, P Condon 0-2, E Desmond 0-1. |

| 15 May 1993 First round | Nemo Rangers | 1-07 - 0-08 | Kilmurry | Éire Óg Grounds |
| | D Allen 1-3, P Buckley 0-1, M Dorgan 0-1, D O'Sullivan 0-1, P O'Donovan 0-1. | | J Clifford 0-4, D Moss 0-2, G Lally 0-2. |

| 15 May 1993 First round | St. Vincent's | 1-11 - 1-09 | Cobh | Riverstown Sportsfield |
| | A Elliott 1-3, G Cooney 0-3, D Murphy 0-3, D Murray 0-1, L Harte 0-1. | | G Morgan 0-4, J Butler 1-0, M O'Driscoll 0-2, K Kenny 0-1, B Frahill 0-1, P Ronan 0-1. |

| 23 May 1993 First round replay | Carrigaline | 0-09 - 1-05 | Newcestown | Páirc Uí Riagáin |
| | O Conlon 0-3, S Stack 0-2, G Healy 0-1, P Long 0-1, T Sutton 0-1, D Fitzgerald 0-1. | | P Condon 1-3, M O'Mahony 0-1, P Kenneally 0-1. |

| 29 May 1993 First round | Knocknagree | 0-07 - 1-15 | Castletownbere | Ballingeary Grounds |
| | B O'Connor 0-3, J Buckley 0-2, Donal O'Connor 0-1, P O'Connor 0-1. | | M O'Sullivan 0-6, E Harrington 1-2, A O'Regan 0-3, S Spencer 0-2, C Collins 0-1, G O'Sullivan 0-1. |

| 19 June 1993 First round | Millstreet | 0-14 - 0-05 | St. Michael's | Castle Grounds |
| | A Barry 0-8, B McSweeney 0-2, S Barrett 0-1, W O'Leary 0-1, T Corkery 0-1, J O'Brien 0-1. | | A Browne 0-2, T Scally 0-1, G Cummins 0-1, M Bennett 0-1. |

=== Second round ===
| 15 May 1993 Second round | Bishopstown | 3-04 - 0-13 | Valley Rovers | Páirc Liam Mhic Cárthaigh |
| | D O'Leary 2-0, J Ryan 1-2, D Fleming 0-1, K O'Callaghan 0-1. | | A Crowley 0-5, D Kiely 0-4, D Callanan 0-3, F Crowley 0-1. |

| 15 May 1993 Second round | Bantry Blues | 3-14 - 2-04 | Castlemartyr | Cloughduv Grounds |
| | K Harrington 1-8, F Delaney 1-0, A Farrelly 1-0, J Cotter 0-2, M Moran 0-2, L O'Brien 0-1, D Goggin 0-1. | | M Conroy 1-0, M Broderick 1-0, J Morgan 0-3, T Barrett 0-1. |

| 16 May 1993 Second round | Ballincollig | 2-16 - 2-04 | Urhan | Sam Maguire Park |
| | C O'Connell 1-3, F Keohane 0-5, J Kelleher 1-1, G Glavin 0-3, P O'Mahony 0-2, J Ring 0-1, P Hennessy 0-1. | | C O'Sullivan 1-3, R O'Dwyer 1-0, DJ O'Sullivan 0-1. |

| 23 May 1993 Second round | Delaneys | 4-02 - 3-10 | Clyda Rovers | Glenville Grounds |
| | D Power 1-2, G Healy 1-0, S McElhinney 1-0, Mark McElhinney 1-0. | | G Lane 0-5, F Dorgan 1-1, B Kelleher 1-0, M Moynihan 1-0 (og), C O'Sullivan 0-2, P O'Mullane 0-1, R Walsh 0-1. |

| 5 June 1993 Second round | Nemo Rangers | 1-16 - 4-07 | Castletownbere | Sam Maguire Park |
| | E Fitzgerald 0-7, M Dorgan 1-2, J Coogan 0-3, P O'Donovan 0-2, D Linehan 0-1, P Buckley 0-1. | | E Harrington 2-1, J Power 2-0, M O'Sullivan 0-4, S Spencer 0-2. |

| 5 June 1993 Second round | Carrigaline | 1-06 - 0-11 | St. Vincent's | Manning Park |
| | P Healy 1-2, O Conlon 0-2, E Kavanagh 0-1, P Aherne 0-1. | | A Elliott 0-4, P Freyne 0-1, B Meehan 0-1, D Murphy 0-1, D Murray 0-1, J Downey 0-1, G Cooney 0-1, B O'Donovan 0-1. |

| 12 June 1993 Second round replay | Nemo Rangers | 1-14 - 1-09 | Castletownbere | Sam Maguire Park |
| | E Fitzgerald 0-7, M Dorgan 1-1, D O'Sullivan 0-2, P O'Donovan 0-1, A Quinlivan 0-1, D Allen 0-1, J Coogan 0-1. | | S Spencer 1-0, A O'Regan 0-3, G O'Sullivan 0-2, N Murphy 0-2, S Harrington 0-2. |

| 19 June 1993 Second round replay | Bishopstown | 1-03 - 0-13 | Valley Rovers | Páirc Liam Mhic Cárthaigh |
| | B Cuthbert 1-0, M McGrath 0-1, D Fleming 0-1, J Ryan 0-1. | | A Crowley 0-5, F Crowley 0-4, L Callanan 0-2, J Bernard 0-1, D Kiely 0-1. |

| 26 June 1993 Second round | St. Finbarr's | 1-11 - 0-06 | Millstreet | Kilmichael Grounds |
| | K Scanlon 1-2, K Nagle 0-3, S Caulfield 0-2, M Barry 0-2, M Slocum 0-1, B Roche 0-1. | | A Barry 0-3, W O'Leary 0-2, B McSweeney 0-1. |

| 27 June 1993 Second round | Naomh Abán | 2-14 - 1-08 | Douglas | Cloughduv Grounds |
| | SF Cronin 1-3, D Cronin (V) 1-0, J McCarthy 0-3, J Lehane 0-2, D Cronin (F) 0-2, D Lynch 0-2, L Forde 0-1, G Lynch 0-1. | | D Larkin 1-4, E Forde 0-1, B Meaney 0-1, R McCarthy 0-1, T Leonard 0-1. |

=== Quarter-finals ===
| 4 July 1993 Quarter-final | Bantry Blues | 4-07 - 0-05 | Valley Rovers | Sam Maguire Park |
| | K Harrington 3-3, L O'Brien 1-1, M Moran 0-3. | | A Crowley 0-4, F Crowley 0-1. |

| 11 July 1993 Quarter-final | Ballincollig | 0-12 - 0-05 | St. Finbarr's | Páirc Uí Chaoimh |
| | F Keohane 0-4, P O'Mahony 0-4, P Hennessy 0-2, J Kelly 0-1, J Kelleher 0-1. | | S Caulfield 0-3, R Lehane 0-2. |

| 11 July 1993 Quarter-final | St. Vincent's | 1-11 - 1-08 | Nemo Rangers | Manning Park |
| | A Elliott 0-4, P Freyne 1-0, D Murphy 0-3, M O'Neill 0-1, R Barry 0-1, W Leahy 0-1, R O'Shea 0-1. | | D Linehan 1-0, D Allen 0-2, M Dorgan 0-2, L O'Sullivan 0-2, P Buckley 0-1, P O'Donovan 0-1. |

| 17 July 1993 Quarter-final | Clyda Rovers | 3-14 - 1-09 | Naomh Abán | Rusheen Grounds |
| | C O'Sullivan 1-4, T McGlinchey 1-2, J O'Sullivan 1-1, G Lane 0-3, R Walsh 0-2, C Cronin 0-1, F Dorgan 0-1. | | D Lynch 0-5, L Burke 1-0, J McCarthy 0-1, D Cronin 0-1, J Lehane 0-1, SF Cronin 0-1. |

=== Semi-finals ===
| 1 August 1993 Semi-final | Ballincollig | 0-10 - 0-06 | St. Vincent's | Páirc Uí Rinn |
| | D Murphy 0-5, T O'Reilly 0-2, G Ring 0-1, G Glavin 0-1, J Kelleher 0-1. | | D Murphy 0-2, J Downey 0-1, G Cooney 0-1, B O'Donovan 0-1, A Elliott 0-1. |

| 7 August 1993 Semi-final | Bantry Blues | 0-13 - 1-10 | Clyda Rovers | Kilmurry Grounds |
| | K Harrington 0-10, P O'Regan 0-1, J Cotter 0-1, S McCarthy 0-1. | | G Lane 1-6, T McGlinchey 0-2, F Dorgan 0-1, P O'Mullane 0-1. |

| 29 August 1993 Semi-final replay | Bantry Blues | 2-12 - 0-08 | Clyda Rovers | Kilmurry Grounds |
| | P Goggin 2-1, K Harrington 0-5, L O'Brien 0-2, S McCarthy 0-2, D O'Neill 0-1, F Delaney 0-1. | | G Lane 0-7, P O'Mullane 0-1, |

=== Final ===
| 26 September 1993 Final | Bantry Blues | 0-12 - 0-10 | Ballincollig | Sam Maguire Park |
| | K Harrington 0-4, F Delaney 0-2, S McCarthy 0-2, L O'Brien 0-1, M Moran 0-1, J Cotter 0-1, P Goggin 0-1. | | F Keohane 0-6, T O'Connell 0-1. | Referee: N Barrett (Carrigtwohill) |

== Championship statistics ==
=== Top scorers ===
Top scorers overall

| Rank | Player | Club | Tally | Total | Matches | Average |
|---|---|---|---|---|---|---|
| 1 | Kevin Harrington | Bantry Blues | 4-30 | 42 | 5 | 8.40 |
| 2 | Ger Lane | Clyda Rovers | 1-21 | 24 | 4 | 6.00 |
| 3 | Anthony Elliott | St. Vincent's | 1-12 | 15 | 4 | 3.75 |
| 3 | Fergus Keohane | Ballincollig | 0-15 | 15 | 4 | 3.75 |
| 5 | Ephie Fitzgerald | Nemo Rangers | 0-14 | 14 | 2 | 7.00 |
| 5 | Aidan Crowley | Valley Rovers | 0-14 | 14 | 3 | 4.66 |

In a single game

| Rank | Player | Club | Tally | Total | Opposition |
|---|---|---|---|---|---|
| 1 | Kevin Harrington | Bantry Blues | 3-03 | 12 | Valley Rovers |
| 2 | Kevin Harrington | Bantry Blues | 1-08 | 11 | Castlemartyr |
| 3 | Kevin Harrington | Bantry Blues | 0-10 | 10 | Clyda Rovers |
| 4 | Ger Lane | Clyda Rovers | 1-06 | 9 | Bantry Blues |
| 5 | Anthony Barry | Millstreet | 0-08 | 8 | St. Michael's |
| 6 | Edward Harrington | Castletownbere | 2-01 | 7 | Nemo Rangers |
| 6 | Paddy Goggin | Bantry Blues | 2-01 | 7 | Clyda Rovers |
| 6 | Cormac O'Sullivan | Clyda Rovers | 1-04 | 7 | Naomh Abán |
| 6 | Dave Larkin | Douglas | 1-04 | 7 | Naomh Abán |
| 6 | Ephie Fitzgerald | Nemo Rangers | 0-07 | 7 | Castletownbere |
| 6 | Ephie Fitzgerald | Nemo Rangers | 0-07 | 7 | Castletownbere |
| 6 | Ger Lane | Clyda Rovers | 0-07 | 7 | Bantry Blues |
