= 1972 Cork Junior Football Championship =

- Dates: 15 October – 10 December 1972
- Teams: 8
- Champions: Bantry Blues (2nd title); P. J. Minihane (captain)
- Runners-up: Adrigole; Jerry Jer O'Sullivan (captain)

Tournament statistics
- Matches played: 7
- Goals scored: 16 (2.29 per match)
- Points scored: 109 (15.57 per match)
- Top scorer(s): Declan Barron (0–17)

The 1972 Cork Junior Football Championship was the 74th staging of the Cork Junior Football Championship since its establishment by Cork County Board in 1895. The championship ran from 15 October to 10 December 1972.

The final was played on 10 December 1972 at Rossa Park in Skibbereen, between Bantry Blues and Adrigole, in what was their first ever meeting in the final. Bantry Blues won the match by 1–12 to 2–06 to claim their second championship title overall and a first title in 44 years. Adrigole became the first team to lose three successive finals, while it was also their fourth defeat in five years.

Bantry's Declan Barron was the championship's top scorer with 0–17.

== Qualification ==
Division	Championship	Champions
Avondhu	North Cork Junior A Football Championship	Mitchelstown
Beara	Beara Junior A Football Championship	Adrigole
Carbery	South West Junior A Football Championship	Bantry Blues
Carrigdhoun	South East Junior A Football Championship	Shamrocks
Duhallow	Duhallow Junior A Football Championship	Boherbue
Imokilly	East Cork Junior A Football Championship	Glenville
Muskerry	Mid Cork Junior A Football Championship	Ballincollig
Seandún	City Junior A Football Championship	St. Nicholas'

== Results ==
=== Quarter-finals ===
15 October 1972 Quarter-final	Boherbue	0–11 – 0–08	Glenville	O'Connell Park
	D Buckley 0–8, C Vaughan 0–2, B Dennehy 0–1.		E Ryan 0–4, D Murphy 0–3, G Herlihy 0–1.

22 October 1972 Quarter-final	Adrigole	1–10 – 2–04	Shamrocks	Ballingeary Grounds
	J O'Sullivan 1–3, KJ O'Sullivan 0–2, M O'Regan 0–2, J O'Neill 0–2, N O'Sullivan 0–1.		G Hanley 1–2, K Murphy 1–0, P Tuohy 0–1, J McCarthy 0–1.

5 November 1972 Quarter-final	Bantry Blues	1–10 – 0–07	Ballincollig	Clonakilty Grounds
	D Hunt 1–4, D Barron 0–5, J O'Riordan 0–1.		T Radley 0–2, T Murphy 0–2, A Kerins 0–1, D White 0–1, J Lucey 0–1.

19 November 1972 Quarter-final	Mitchelstown	1–10 – 0–06	St. Nicholas'	Castlelyons Grounds
	J Barrett 0–7, T Molan 1–0, S Fitzgerald 0–2, M O'Malley 0–1.

=== Semi-finals ===
3 December 1972 Semi-final	Bantry Blues	3–07 – 3–04	Boherbue	Castle Grounds
	D Barron 0–6, D Hunt 1–0, Kelly 1–0, J O'Riordan 1–0, B Williams 0–1.		C Vaughan 1–1, J O'Sullivan 1–0, B O'Riordan 1–0, P Moynihan 0–1, J Daly 0–1, D Buckley 0–1.	Referee: A Twomey (Ballincollig)

3 December 1972 Semi-final	Adrigole	1–08 – 1–06	Mitchelstown	Sam Maguire Park
	JJ O'Sullivan 1–2, EJ O'Sullivan 0–2, PJ O'Sullivan 0–2, M O'Regan 0–1, N O'Sullivan 0–1.		J Barrett 0–4, D Nolan 1–0, S Fitzgerald 0–1, B Honohan 0–1.	Referee: L Meade (Ballinascarthy)

=== Final ===
10 December 1972 Final	Bantry Blues	1–12 – 2–06	Adrigole	Rossa Park
	D Barron 0–6, M Connolly 1–0, D Hunt 0–1, B Murphy 0–1, D Cotter 0–1, T O'Sullivan 0–1.		EJ O'Sullivan 2–4, M Carey 0–1, S O'Shea 0–1.

== Championship statistics ==
=== Top scorers ===
Rank	Player	Club	Tally	Total	Matches	Average
1	Declan Barron	Bantry Blues	0–17	17	3	5.66
2	Eddie Jer O'Sullivan	Adrigole	2–06	12	3	4.00
3	Donal Hunt	Bantry Blues	2–05	11	3	3.66
3	Jerry Jer O'Sullivan	Adrigole	2–05	11	3	3.66
3	Jimmy Barrett	Mitchelstown	0–11	11	2	5.56
