= 1981 Cork Junior Football Championship =

- Dates: 27 September – 29 November 1981
- Teams: 8
- Champions: Ballincollig (3rd title)
- Runners-up: Aghada

Tournament statistics
- Matches played: 7
- Goals scored: 23 (3.29 per match)
- Points scored: 96 (13.71 per match)

The 1981 Cork Junior Football Championship was the 83rd staging of the Cork Junior Football Championship since its establishment by Cork County Board in 1895.

The final was played on 29 November 1981 at Páirc Séamus de Barra in Carrigtwohill, between Ballincollig and Aghada, in what was their first ever meeting in the final. Ballincollig won the match by 2–11 to 2–07 to claim their third championship title overall and a first title in 41 years.

== Results ==
=== Quarter-finals ===
27 September 1981 Quarter-final	Valley Rovers	4-08 - 1-05	Bere Island	Wolfe Tone Park

11 October 1981 Quarter-final	Aghada	3-07 - 2-08	St Nicholas'	Páirc Shéamuis de Barra

25 October 1981 Quarter-final	Knocknagree	1-04 - 0-09	Ballincollig	Castle Grounds

15 November 1981 Quarter-final	Clann na nGael	3-03 - 0-07	Deel Rovers	Castle Grounds

=== Semi-finals ===
25 October 1981 Semi-final	Aghada	1-09 - 1-02	Valley Rovers	Páirc Uí Chaoimh

22 November 1981 Semi-final	Ballincollig	2-12 - 1-03	Clann na nGael	Charlie Hurley Park

=== Final ===
29 November 1981 Final	Ballincollig	2-11 – 2-07	Aghada	Páirc Shéamuis de Barra
	F O'Donovan (1–3), B McCarthy (1–2), D O'Driscoll, F Daly, E O'Connor, Paul Coomey, E Keating and K Coomey (0–1 each)		J Fleming (1–1), A Ahern (1–1), C Hennessey (0–2), K O'Connell (0–1), B Ahern (0–1, free), J O'Leary (0–1).	Referee: E Porter (Brian Dillons)
