= 1938 Cork Senior Football Championship =

Gaelic football competition

- Dates: 20 March – 27 November 1938
- Teams: 13
- Champions: St Nicholas' (1st title); Jack Buckley (captain)
- Runners-up: Clonakilty; Pakie Nyhan (captain)

Tournament statistics
- Matches played: 13
- Goals scored: 40 (3.08 per match)
- Points scored: 80 (6.15 per match)

The 1938 Cork Senior Football Championship was the 50th staging of the Cork Senior Football Championship since its establishment by the Cork County Board in 1887. The draw for the first round fixtures took place on 30 January 1938. The championship ran from 20 March to 27 November 1938.

Carbery were the defending champions, however, they were beaten by Clonakilty in the second round.

The final was played on 27 November 1938 at the Bandon Grounds, between St Nicholas' and Clonakilty, in what was their first ever meeting in the final. St Nicholas' won the match by 2–01 to 0–02 to claim their first ever championship title.

== Results ==
=== First round ===
20 March 1938 First round	Avondhu	3-01 - 2-01	University College Cork	Fermoy Sports Grounds

3 April 1938 First round	Kilmurry	0-04 - 2-02	Imokilly	The Mardyke

3 April 1938 First round	Collins	3-03 - 4-02	Carbery	Clonakilty Grounds

10 April 1938 First round	Macroom	1-03 - 1-03	Clonakilty	Enniskean Grounds

10 April 1938 First round	St Nicholas'	1-02 - 0-02	Beara	Bantry Grounds

10 April 1938 First round	Seandún	2-02 - 0-05	Lees	Cork Athletic Grounds

15 May 1938 First round replay	Macroom	3-04 - 3-06	Clonakilty	Enniskean Grounds

- Duhallow received a bye in this round.

=== Second round ===
1 May 1938 Second round	Duhallow	0-02 - 2-05	St Nicholas'	Castle Grounds

26 June 1938 Second round	Avondhu	0-03 - 2-01	Imokilly	The Mardyke

3 July 1938 Second round	Carbery	1-03 - 0-08	Clonakilty	Bandon Grounds

- Seandún received a bye in this round.

=== Semi-final ===
28 August 1938 Semi-final	St Nicholas'	6-04 - 2-00	Seandún	Cork Athletic Grounds

4 September 1938 Semi-final	Imokilly	0-03 - 0-08	Clonakilty	Cork Athletic Grounds

=== Final ===
27 November 1938 Final	St Nicholas'	2-01 - 0-02	Clonakilty	Bandon Grounds

== Championship statistics ==
=== Miscellaneous ===
- St. Nicholas' make their first appearance at senior level.
- St. Nicholas' qualify for the final for the first time.
- St. Nicholas' win their first title.
- St. Nicholas' sister club Glen Rovers also won the Cork Hurling Championship. The following players completed the double: Paddy O'Donovan, Danny Matt Dorgan, Jack Lynch, Connie Buckley, Dan Moylan, Charlie Tobin and Tim Kiely.
- Clonakilty lose a sixth final seven years.
