= 1937 Cork Intermediate Football Championship =

Gaelic football competition

- Dates: 11 April - 31 October 1937
- Teams: 7
- Champions: St. Nicholas' (2nd title); J. Buckley (captain)
- Runners-up: Bantry Blues; T. Cotter (captain)

Tournament statistics
- Matches played: 6
- Goals scored: 20 (3.33 per match)
- Points scored: 48 (8 per match)

The 1937 Cork Intermediate Football Championship was the 28th staging of the Cork Intermediate Football Championship since its establishment by the Cork County Board in 1909. The draw for the opening round fixtures took place on 31 January 1937. The championship ran from 11 April to 31 October 1937.

Bantry Blues entered the championship as the defending champions.

The final was played on 31 October 1937 at the Dunmanway Gaelic Grounds, between St Nicholas' and Bantry Blues, in what was their first meeting in the final in three years. St. Nicholas' won the match, a replay, by 3-03 to 0-02 to claim their second championship title overall and a first title in 20 years.

== Results ==
=== Quarter-finals ===
11 April 1937 Quarter-final	St. Nicholas'	5-08 - 1-00	Shamrocks	Douglas Grounds

25 April 1937 Quarter-final	St. Columba's	0-00 - 2-12	Dohenys	Ballincollig Grounds

9 May 1937 Quarter-final	Bantry Blues	2-02 - 1-03	Dromtarriffe	Cork Athletic Grounds

- Mallow received a bye in this round.

=== Semi-final ===
27 June 1937 Semi-final	St. Nicholas'	1-05 - 0-06	Dohenys	Bandon Grounds

27 June 1937 Semi-final	Bantry Blues	w/o - scr.	Mallow	The Mardyke

=== Final ===
3 October 1937 Final	St. Nicholas'	2-05 - 3-02	Bantry Blues	Dunmanway Gaelic Grounds

31 October 1937 Final	St. Nicholas'	3-03 - 0-02	Bantry Blues	Dunmanway Gaelic Grounds
