= 1954 Cork Senior Football Championship =

Gaelic football competition

- Dates: 21 March - 3 October 1954
- Teams: 23
- Champions: St Nicholas' (3rd title); John Lyons (captain)
- Runners-up: Clonakilty; Humphrey O'Neill (captain)

Tournament statistics
- Matches played: 24
- Goals scored: 65 (2.71 per match)
- Points scored: 269 (11.21 per match)

The 1954 Cork Senior Football Championship was the 66th staging of the Cork Senior Football Championship since its establishment by the Cork County Board in 1887. The draw for the first round fixtures took place on 24 January 1954. The championship ran from 21 March to 3 October 1954.

Collins were the defending champions, however, they were beaten by St Finbarr's in the second round.

The final was played on 3 October 1954 at the Athletic Grounds in Cork, between St Nicholas' and Clonakilty, in what was their third meeting in the final. St Nicholas' won the match by 2-11 to 0-03 to claim their third championship title overall and a first title in 13 years.

== Results ==
=== First round ===
21 March 1954 First round	Carrigdhoun	1-01 - 3-09	St Vincent's	Carrigaline Grounds

21 March 1954 First round	Garda	3-01 - 2-04	Glanmire	Riverstown Sportsfield

21 March 1954 First round	Avondhu	1-02 - 5-05	St Finbarr's	Páirc Mac Gearailt

21 March 1954 First round	Muskerry	0-02 - 2-04	Clonakilty	Bandon Grounds
	S O'Sullivan 0-1, Byrne 0-1.		J Adams 1-1, S Collins 1-0, K McCarthy 0-1, J Lyons 0-1, M Ryan 0-1.

4 April 1954 First round	Duhallow	0-02 - 3-07	Collins	Kanturk Grounds

4 April 1954 First round	Millstreet	1-04 - 2-08	University College Cork	Coachford Sportsfield

4 April 1954 First round	Carbery	0-05 - 1-07	Macroom	Sam Maguire Park

11 April 1954 First round	Beara	0-11 - 1-03	Bandon	Wolfe Tone Park

2 May 1954 First round	Seandún	3-03 - 1-03	Imokilly	Carrignafoy Grounds

2 May 1954 First round	St Nicholas'	2-07 - 0-07	Lees	The Mardyke
	J Clifford 1-2, V Dorgan 1-1, J Lynam 0-2, D Creedon 0-1.		P O'Shea 0-4, N Duggan 0-1, P O'Donovan 0-1, M Shine 0-1.

2 May 1954 First round	Canovee	1-10 - 0-01	Castlemagner	Millstreet Grounds

30 May 1954 First round replay	Garda	1-08 - 1-01	Glanmire	Cork Athletic Grounds

- Fermoy received a bye in this round.

=== Second round ===
16 May 1954 Second round	Macroom	2-06 - 0-04	Seandún	Coachford Sportsfield
	J Creedon 1-1, E Downey 1-1, M Goold 0-1, J Galvin 0-1, J Murphy 0-1.		T Furlong 0-2, B Murphy 0-1, K Kelly 0-1.

16 May 1954 Second round	St Nicholas'	2-06 - 0-08	University College Cork	Cork Athletic Grounds
	S Daly 2-2, D Creedon 0-2, V Dorgan 0-1, J Lynam 0-1.		P Sheehy 0-4, J Brosnan 0-2, T Murphy 0-1, S O'Donnell 0-1.

6 June 1954 Second round	St Vincent's	3-05 - 1-04	Canovee	Coachford Sportsfield

13 June 1954 Second round	Garda	2-07 - 2-05	Beara	Rossa Park

19 June 1954 Second round	St Finbarr's	3-06 - 1-08	Collins	The Mardyke

27 June 1954 Second round	Fermoy	1-02 - 1-13	Clonakilty	Cork Athletic Grounds

=== Quarter-finals ===
1 August 1954 Quarter-final	Macroom	1-07 - 1-07	St Finbarr's	Caochford Sportsfield
				Referee: M Barrett

8 August 1954 Quarter-final	Clonakilty	0-06 - 0-04 (declared void)	Garda

22 August 1954 Quarter-final replay	Macroom	1-09 - 2-04	St Finbarr's	Coachford Sportsfield

12 September 1954 Quarter-final replay	Clonakilty	1-09 - 0-06	Garda	Castle Grounds
	D Cullinane 1-0, J Adams 0-3, J Lyons 0-2, Moriarty 0-2, B Kingston 0-1, Collins 0-1.		S Keevans 0-3, P Lyons 0-1, Monaghan 0-1.

- St Nicholas' and St Vincent's received byes in this round.

=== Semi-finals ===
30 July 1954 Semi-final	St Nicholas'	2-04 - 1-04	St Vincent's	The Mardyke
	J Hartnett 1-0, D O'Sullivan 1-0, D Creedon 0-1, D O'Donovan 0-1, V Twomey 0-1, C Ring 0-1.		E Prendergast 1-0, C O'Shea 0-1, J Coughlan 0-1, J O'Callaghan 0-1, B O'Shea 0-1.

19 September 1954 Semi-final	Clonakilty	1-05 - 1-02	Macroom	Cork Athletic Grounds
	J Adams 1-2, T Moriarty 0-3.		J O'Callaghan 1-0, P O'Leary 0-1, M Murphy 0-1.

=== Final ===
3 October 1954 Final	St Nicholas'	2-11 - 0-03	Clonakilty	Cork Athletic Grounds, Cork
	F Daly 2-1, D Creedon 0-6, C Ring 0-3, J Twomey 0-1.		J Adams 0-1, T Moriarty 0-1, B Kingston 0-1.	Attendance: 14,910; Referee: T Cotter (Bantry)

== Championship statistics ==
=== Miscellaneous ===
- St Nicholas' sister club Glen Rovers also won the Cork Hurling Championship to complete the double for the third time.
- Christy Ring won his only Cork SFC medal.
