= 1941 Cork Senior Football Championship =

Gaelic football competition

- Dates: 6 April 1941 – 18 January 1942
- Teams: 19
- Champions: St. Nicholas' (2nd title); Jack Buckley (captain)
- Runners-up: Millstreet

The 1941 Cork Senior Football Championship was the 53rd staging of the Cork Senior Football Championship since its establishment by the Cork County Board in 1887. The draw for the opening round fixtures took place on 26 January 1941. The championship began on 6 April 1941 and ended on 18 January 1942.

Beara entered the championship as the defending champions.

On 18 January 1942, St. Nicholas' won the championship following a 1–08 to 1–05 defeat of Millstreet in the final. This was their second championship title and their first title since 1938.

== Results ==
=== First round ===
6 April 1941 First round	Ballincollig	0-01 - 2-09	Dromtarriffe	Castle Grounds

20 April 1941 First round	Clonakilty	1-07 - 1-01	Duhallow	Cork Athletic Grounds

27 April 1941 First round	Macroom	1-04 - 3-08	St. Nicholas'	Castle Grounds

11 May 1941 First round	Imokilly	2-05 - 1-03	Dohenys	Cork Athletic Grounds

11 May 1941 First round	Avondhu	1-00 - 5-10	Bantry	Cork Athletic Grounds

11 May 1941 First round	Seandún	5-03 - 1-03	Kilmurry	Ballincollig Sportsfield

18 May 1941 First round	Beara	3-07 - 0-00	Muskerry	Bantry Sportsfield

18 May 1941 First round	Midleton	5-02 - 0-06	Fermoy	Riverstown Sportsfield

1 June 1941 First round	Carbery	3-06 - 3-03	Sarsfields	Bandon Sportsfield

- Millstreet received a bye in this round.

=== Second round ===
22 June 1941 Second round	Bantry	1-09 - 1-02	Imokilly	Bandon Sportsfield

22 June 1941	Millstreet	2-05 - 0-02	Seandún	Castle Grounds

=== Quarter-finals ===
13 July 1941 Quarter-final	Beara	2-07 - 2-02	Midleton	Clonakilty Sportsfield

27 July 1941 Quarter-final	St. Nicholas'	3-02 - 1-06	Sarsfields	The Mardyke

27 July 1941 Quarter-final	Clonakilty	1-03 - 0-06	Dromtarriffe	Dunmanway Sportsfield

10 August 1941 Quarter-final replay	Clonakilty	1-07 - 1-07	Dromtarriffe	Castle Grounds

17 August 1941 Quarter-final 2nd replay	Clonakilty	2-06 - 1-09	Dromtarriffe	Castle Grounds

31 August 1941 Quarter-final 3rd replay	Clonakilty	1-07 - 1-07	Dromtarriffe	Castle Grounds

7 September 1941 Quarter-final 4th replay	Clonakilty	3-05 - 0-05	Dromtarriffe	Castle Grounds

=== Semi-finals ===
28 September 1941 Semi-final (declared void)	Bantry	4-03 - 1-02	Clonakilty	Skibbereen Town Park

2 November 1941 Semi-final refixture	Bantry	0-07 - 1-04	Clonakilty	Dunmanway Sportsfield

Semi-final	Millstreet	v

9 November 1941 Semi-final	Beara	0-03 - 1-00	St. Nicholas'	Bantry Sportsfield

30 November 1941 Semi-final replay	Beara	0-09 - 2-03	St. Nicholas'	Bantry Sportsfield

21 December 1941 Semi-final 2nd replay	Beara	2-04 - 3-04	St. Nicholas'	Dunmanway Sportsfield

=== Final ===
18 January 1942 Final	St. Nicholas'	1-08 - 1-05	Millstreet	Castle Ground

== Championship statistics ==
=== Miscellaneous ===
- St. Nicholas' sister club Glen Rovers also won the Cork Hurling Championship to complete the double.
