= 1941 Cork Senior Hurling Championship =

Annual hurling competition season

- Dates: 6 April – 12 October 1941
- Teams: 12
- Champions: Glen Rovers (8th title); Connie Buckley (captain)
- Runners-up: Ballincollig; Willie Murphy (captain)

Tournament statistics
- Matches played: 11
- Goals scored: 88 (8 per match)
- Points scored: 86 (7.82 per match)

The 1941 Cork Senior Hurling Championship was the 53rd staging of the Cork Senior Hurling Championship since its establishment by the Cork County Board in 1887. The draw for the opening round fixtures took place at the Cork Convention on 26 January 1941. The championship began on 6 April 1941 and ended on 12 October 1941.

Glen Rovers entered the championship as the defending champions.

The final was played on 12 October 1941 at the Athletic Grounds in Cork, between Glen Rovers and Ballincollig, in what was their first ever meeting in the final. Glen Rovers won the match by 4–07 to 2–02 to claim their eighth championship title overall and an eighth title in succession.

== Results ==
=== First round ===
6 April 1941 First round	Avondhu	14-06 - 2-01	Carbery	The Mardyke
		J O'Regan 2-0, D Cullinane 0-1.	Pratt 1-1, Aherne 3-0, Lyons 1-1, Donovan 2-0,	Referee: J Buckley (Glen Rovers)

27 April 1941 First round	Carrigdhoun	3-00 - 7-05	Sarsfields	The Mardyke
	Andrews 1-0,

4 May 1941 First round	Muskerry	1-02 - 3-08	St. Finbarr's	The Mardyke

25 May 1941 First round	Imokilly	2-02 - 5-06	Blackrock	Riverstown Sportsfield
				Referee: P Taylor (Fr. Matthew Hall)

30 May 1941 First round	Seandún	4-03 - 7-06	Glen Rovers	Cork Athletic Grounds
			P Barry 2-0, C Buckley 2-0, D Moylan 1-0, C Sweeney 1-0, J Buckley 1-0, J Lynch 0-3, W Hickey 0-1.	Referee: D Harrington (Blarney)

8 June 1941 First round	Ballincollig	2-05 - 1-03	Mallow	The Mardyke
	P Healy 1-0, M O'Connor 1-0, G Murphy 0-3, J Burrowes 0-2.		C Clehane 1-0, M O'Leary 0-1, E McCarthy 0-1, M Sheehan 0-1.	Referee: P Taylor (Fr. Matthew Hall)

=== Second round ===
29 June 1941 Second round	Sarsfields	3-04 - 3-02	Avondhu	The Mardyke
	P Garvan 2-0, M Brennan 1-0, D Beckett 0-1, P Campbell 0-1, W Campbell 0-1, W Beckett 0-1.		T Lyons 1-1, E Morrissey 1-0, J Pratt 0-1.	Referee: DJ Buckley (St. Anne's)

13 July 1941 Second round	Glen Rovers	3-04 - 1-04	St. Finbarr's	Cork Athletic Grounds
	C Tobin 2-0, P Barry 1-0, J Looney 0-1, J Buckley 0-1, D Coughlan 0-1, J Lycnh 0-1,		V Lynch 1-0, J O'Mahony 0-3, S Condon 0-1.

- Ballincollig and Blackrock received byes in this round.

=== Semi-finals ===
27 July 1941 Semi-final	Ballincollig	6-03 - 3-06	Blackrock	The Mardyke
	D McCarthy 2-0, P Healy 1-1, M O'Connor 1-0, C Radley 1-0, C Murphy 0-1, P Lynch 0-1.		T O'Sullivan 1-0, P Reidy 1-0, M Flynn 0-2, T Vaughan 0-1, P O'Keeffe 0-1, E Daly 0-1, J Leahy 0-1.	Referee: M Finnegan (Collins)

31 August 1941 Semi-final	Glen Rovers	5-05 - 4-02	Sarsfields	The Mardyke
	J Buckley 2-1, D Coughlan 1-2, D Moylan 1-1, J Young 1-0, C Tobin 0-1.		D Beckett 3-1, W Beckett 1-0, W Campbell 0-1.

=== Final ===
12 October 1941 Final	Glen Rovers	4-07 - 2-02	Ballincollig	Cork Athletic Grounds
	D Moylan 1-0; C Buckley 1-0; J Buckley 1-0; C Tobin 1-2; J Lynch 0-2; P Barry 0-1; C Ring 0-1; D McDonnell 0-1.		S Burrowes 1-0; D McCarthy 1-0; C Murphy 0-2.	Attendance: 12,000

== Championship statistics ==
=== Miscellaneous ===
- Glen Rovers win a record eighth title in a row.
- Connie Buckley wins his eighth medal. Making him the only member of the Glen Rovers side to play in all eight finals.
- Ballincollig qualified for the final for the first time in the club's history.
- Christy Ring won the first of his record fourteen county titles.
- Glen Rovers sister club St. Nicholas' also won the Cork Football Championship to complete the double for the second time in four seasons.
