= 1963 Cork Junior Hurling Championship =

Irish hurling competition

- Dates: 22 September – 8 December 1963
- Teams: 7
- Champions: Ballincollig (2nd title)
- Runners-up: Castlemartyr

Tournament statistics
- Matches played: 7
- Goals scored: 52 (7.43 per match)
- Points scored: 92 (13.14 per match)

The 1963 Cork Junior Hurling Championship was the 66th staging of the Cork Junior Hurling Championship since its establishment by the Cork County Board in 1895. The championship ran from 22 September to 8 December 1963.

The final, a replay, was played on 8 December 1963 at the Athletic Grounds in Cork, between Ballincollig and Castlemartyr, in what was their first ever meeting in the final. Ballincollig won the match by 1-11 to 1-07 to claim their second championship title overall and a first championship title in 36 years.

== Results ==
=== Quarter-finals ===
22 September 1963 Quarter-final	Castlemartyr	6-08 - 2-05	Nemo Rangers	Riverstown Sportsfield

6 October 1963 Quarter-final	Ballincollig	7-10 - 2-02	Dohenys	Charlie Hurley Park

13 October 1963 Quarter-final	Kildorrery	1-05 - 0-04	Shamrocks	Cork Athletic Grounds

- Millstreet received a bye in this round.

=== Semi-finals ===
20 October 1963 Semi-final	Castlemartyr	7-10 - 4-02	Kildorrery	Cork Athletic Grounds

3 November 1963 Semi-final	Ballincollig	9-08 - 2-10	Millstreet	Castle Grounds

=== Final ===
1 December 1963 Final	Ballincollig	4-08 - 6-02	Castlemartyr	Cork Athletic Grounds
	J Murphy 2-1, T Murphy 1-4, S Barry-Murphy 1-0, W Fitton 0-1, F O'Callaghan 0-1, G O'Regan 0-1.		L Dowling 3-1, D O'Keeffe 1-1, N Ryan 1-0, V Dowling 1-0.

=== Final replay ===
8 December 1963 Final replay	Ballincollig	1-11 - 1-07	Castlemartyr	Cork Athletic Grounds
	T O'Dwyer 1-1, T Murphy 0-4, S Barry-Murphy 0-2, J Murphy 0-1, D Forde 0-1, G O'Regan 0-1, W Fitton 0-1.		D O'Keeffe 1-1, N Ryan 0-3, E Riordan 0-1, J Whyte 0-1, D Barry 0-1.
