= Wellington Road =

Wellington Road may refer to:

== Roads ==
=== Australia ===
- Wellington Road, Adelaide, the former name of a stretch of Portrush Road, Adelaide, South Australia
- Wellington Road, South Australia, a secondary road in the Adelaide Hills region of South Australia

=== Elsewhere ===
- Wellington Road, Cork, in the city of Cork, Ireland
- Wellington Road (London, Ontario), Canada
- Wellington Road, London, a road in London, United Kingdom
- Wellington Road (Manassas, Virginia), United States

== Other uses ==
- Wellington Road (Perry Barr), a former football ground and home of Aston Villa, Birmingham, England, UK
