= 1994 Cork Intermediate Football Championship =

Gaelic football competition

- Dates: 7 May - 25 September 1994
- Teams: 23
- Champions: Ballincollig (1st title); David Bourke (captain)
- Runners-up: Clyda Rovers; Cormac O'Sullivan (captain)

Tournament statistics
- Matches played: 26
- Goals scored: 43 (1.65 per match)
- Points scored: 442 (17 per match)
- Top scorer(s): Podsie O'Mahony (4-13)

The 1994 Cork Intermediate Football Championship was the 59th staging of the Cork Intermediate Football Championship since its establishment by the Cork County Board in 1909. The draw for the opening round fixtures took place on 12 December 1993. The championship ran from 7 May to 25 September 1994.

The final was played on 25 September 1994 at Páirc Uí Chaoimh in Cork, between Ballincollig and Clyda Rovers, in what was their first ever meeting in a final. Ballincollig won the match by 2–07 to 2–04 to claim their first ever championship title.

Ballincollig's Podsie O'Mahony was the championship's top scorer with 4–13.

== Results ==
=== First round ===
7 May 1994 First round	Newcestown	3-07 - 2-06	Bishopstown	Ballincollig Grounds
	M O'Mahony 1-2, P Condon 1-2, T Buckley 1-0, P Kenneally 0-2, D Twohig 0-1.		S Crowley 1-0, J Ryan 1-0, D Fleming 0-3, D O'Brien 0-2, K McCarthy 0-1.

14 May 1994 First round	St. Finbarr's	1-06 - 0-05	Cobh	Páirc Uí Chaoimh
	R Lehane 1-1, J O'Donoghue 0-3, T Power 0-1, I Keeler 0-1.		D Barrett 0-4, P Looney 0-1.

15 May 1994 First round	Urhan	0-08 - 0-08	Nemo Rangers	Sam Maguire Park
	C O'Sullivan 0-4, B O'Dwyer 0-1, S O'Shea 0-1, R O'Dwyer 0-1, DJ O'Shea 0-1.		L O'Sullivan 0-4, M Dorgan 0-1, M Cotter 0-1, D Allen 0-1, J Coogan 0-1.

15 May 1994 First round	Naomh Abán	0-09 - 1-05	Millstreet	Castle Grounds
	J McCarthy 0-6, S Cronin 0-1, J Lehane 0-1, D Lynch 0-1.		M Thornton 1-0, W O'Leary 0-3, B McSweeney 0-1, T O'Connor 0-1.

15 May 1994 First round	Knocknagree	0-11 - 1-05	Delaneys	Carrigadrohid Grounds
	N O'Connor 0-4, E McSweeney 0-2, A Cronin 0-2, M Brosnan 0-1, G Carroll 0-1, J Buckley 0-1.		P Crowley 1-1, M McElhinney 0-1, B Egan 0-1, C Titley 0-1, D Power 0-1.

15 May 1994 First round	Castlemartyr	1-12 - 1-12	Douglas	Páirc Séamus de Barra
	J Morgan 0-9, J Smiddy 1-0, T Barrett 0-2, C Enright 0-1.		B McCarthy 1-1, R McCarthy 0-4, D Meade 0-3, J Quirke 0-2, N McSorley 0-1, R Geary 0-1.

22 May 1994 First round	Clyda Rovers	0-21 - 1-02	St. Michael's	Carrignavar Grounds
	R Walsh 0-4, T McGlinchey 0-4, P O'Mullane 0-4, B Lane 0-3, B Kelleher 0-2, C O'Sullivan 0-2, F Dorgan 0-1, C Cronin 0-1.		T Ahern 1-0, D Cooke 0-1, M O'Donovan 0-1.

22 May 1994 First round replay	Urhan	3-08 - 1-09	Nemo Rangers	Sam Maguire Park
	C O'Sullivan 1-6, B O'Dwyer 1-0, A Mullins 1-0, S O'Shea 0-1, R O'Dwyer 0-1.		L O'Sullivan 0-6, D Creedon 1-0, J Coogan 0-2, M Cotter 0-1.

28 May 1994 First round replay	Castlemartyr	0-08 - 0-10	Douglas	Páirc Séamus de Barra
	J Morgan 0-5, T Barrett 0-1, M Conroy 0-1, K Murphy 0-1.		R McCarthy 0-5, K Golden 0-1, B McCarthy 0-1, N McSorley 0-1, D Meade 0-1, D Larkin 0-1.

=== Second round ===
14 May 1994 Second round	Dohenys	0-04 - 2-07	Kilmurry	Charlie Hurley Park
	Barry O'Herlihy 0-1, T Buckley 0-1, C Crowley 0-1, K Murray 0-1.		TJ O'Leary 2-0, S Kearney 0-2, M Kelleher 0-1, O Plunkett 0-1, G Lally 0-1, D Moss 0-1, J Clifford 0-1.

14 May 1994 Second round	Carrigaline	0-05 - 2-07	Ballincollig	Páirc Uí Rinn
	P Healy 0-2, E Kavanagh 0-2, F Ditzgerald 0-1.		P O'Mahony 2-1, T O'Reilly 0-3, F Keohane 0-2, J Kelleher 0-1.

15 May 1994 Second round	Valley Rovers	1-11 - 1-09	Macroom	Kilmurry Grounds
	A Crowley 0-4, K McCarthy 1-0, D Kiely 0-2, J Hurley 0-1, J Bernard 0-1, D Callanan 0-1, M Kelleher 0-1, C O'Donovan 0-1.		N Twomey 1-5, A O'Shea 0-1, J O'Connor 0-1, S O'Shea 0-1, D Murray 0-1.

15 May 1994 Second round	St. Vincent's	0-10 - 0-08	Castletownebere	Sam Maguire Park
	A Elliot 0-4, R O'Donovan 0-3, G O'Connor 0-2, D Murphy 0-1.		S Spencer 0-3, G O'Sullivan 0-1, J Power 0-1, A O'Regan 0-1, M O'Sullivan 0-1, N Murphy 0-1.

11 June 1994 Second round	Douglas	0-10 - 3-07	Clyda Rovers	Glenville Grounds
	R McCarthy 0-4, J Quirke 0-2, P Monaghan 0-1, D Larkin 0-1, N McSorley 0-1, B McCarthy 0-1.		T Walsh 2-1, G Lane 0-5, F Dorgan 1-1.

12 June 1994 Second round	Newcestown	1-10 - 1-10	Knocknagree	Carrigadrohid Grounds
	P Condon 1-4, M O'Mahony 0-3, P Kenneally 0-2, E Kenneally 0-1.		N O'Connor 0-8, E McSweeney 1-1, A Cronin 0-1.

12 June 1994 Second round	St. Finbarr's	0-05 - 0-11	Urhan	Ballingeary Grounds
	T Leahy 0-3, B Hurley 0-2.		C O'Sullivan 0-3, B O'Dwyer 0-3, F Harrington 0-2, A Mullins 0-1, MC Harrington 0-1, P Hanley 0-1.

19 June 1994 Second round	Naomh Abán	1-07 - 1-16	Kilshannig	Dromtarriffe Grounds
	J McCarthy 1-6, M Cronin 0-1.		W O'Riordan 0-5, P Dockery 1-1, P O'Connor 0-4, P Ryan 0-4, D O'Connell 0-1, B O'Sullivan 0-1.

29 June 1994 Second round replay	Newcestown	1-13 - 1-07	Knocknagree	Carrigadrohid Grounds
	N O'Mahony 1-2, P Kenneally 0-3, E Kenneally 0-2, P Condon 0-2, T Buckley 0-1, S O'Donovan 0-1, T Crowley 0-1, P Crowley 0-1.		J Buckley 0-4, D Fitzgerald 1-0, N O'Connor 0-2, A Cronin 0-1.

=== Quarter-finals ===
3 July 1994 Quarter-final	Clyda Rovers	0-09 - 1-06	Kilshannig	Mallow Grounds
	C O'Sullivan 0-4, R Walsh 0-2, G Lane 0-1, T Murphy 0-1, P O'Mullane 0-1.		P Dockery 1-0, P O'Connell 0-3, W O'Riordan 0-2, D Ryan 0-1.

15 July 1994 Quarter-final	Valley Rovers	2-10 - 2-05	St. Vincent's	Ballinora Grounds
	D Kiely 1-2, P Hoey 1-0, A Crowley 0-3, J Bernard 0-3, PJ Deasy 0-1, C O'Donovan 0-1.		L Harte 1-0, A Elliot 1-0, G Cooney 0-3, B Donovan 0-1, G O'Connor 0-1.

22 July 1994 Quarter-final	Ballincollig	1-08 - 0-08	Kilmurry	Ballyanley Grounds
	P O'Mahony 1-3, T O'Reilly 0-2, E Long 0-1, F Keohane 0-1, D Kelly 0-1.		J Clifford 0-3, D Moss 0-2, M Kelleher 0-2, S Murphy 0-1.

30 July 1994 Quarter-final replay	Clyda Rovers	0-05 - 0-04	Kilshannig	Mallow Grounds
	C O'Sullivan 0-2, P O'Mullane 0-1, R Walsh 0-1, J Walsh 0-1.		W O'Riordan 0-3, D Ryan 0-1.

7 August 1994 Quarter-final	Urhan	1-10 - 0-08	Newcestown	Wolfe Tone Park
	A Mullins 1-0, P Hanley 0-3, B O'Dwyer 0-2, O O'Sullivan 0-2, L O'Sullivan 0-1, S O'Shea 0-1, T O'Sullivan 0-1.		M O'Mahony 0-4, T Crowley 0-2, S Lordan 0-1, P Kenneally 0-1.

=== Semi-finals ===
21 August 1994 Semi-final	Ballincollig	1-15 - 1-08	Valley Rovers	Cloughduv Grounds
	P O'Mahony 1-6, F Smyth 0-2, T O'Reilly 0-2, F Keohane 0-2, D Kelly 0-2, D Hegarty 0-1.		C O'Donovan 1-1, A Crowley 0-4, J Hurley 0-1, TJ Deasy 0-1, D Kiely 0-1.

28 August 1994 Semi-final	Clyda Rovers	0-17 - 0-09	Urhan	Ballingeary Grounds
	T McGlinchey 0-5, G Lane 0-4, F Dorgan 0-2, P O'Mullane 0-2, J Walsh 0-1, R Cronin 0-1, C Cronin 0-1, Cormac O'Sullivan 0-1.		B O'Dwyer 0-4, O O'Sullivan 0-2, S O'Shea 0-1, R O'Dwyer 0-1, P Hanley 0-1.

=== Final ===
25 September 1994 Final	Ballincollig	2-07 - 2-04	Clyda Rovers	Páirc Uí Chaoimh
	F Keohane 1-1, D Bourke 1-0, P O'Mahony 0-3, F Smith 0-1, T O'Reilly 0-1, G Glavin 0-1.		G Lane 1-0, M O'Shea 1-0, R Walsh 0-1, T McGlinchey 0-1, F Dorgan 0-1, P O'Mullane 0-1.	Referee: E Murphy (Douglas)

== Championship statistics ==
=== Top scorers ===
Top scorers overall

Rank	Player	Club	Tally	Total	Matches	Average
1	Podsie O'Mahony	Ballincollig	4-13	25	4	6.25
2	Michael O'Mahony	Newcestown	2-11	17	4	4.25
3	Ciarán O'Sullivan	Urhan	1-13	16	3	5.33
3	Ger Lane	Clyda Rovers	1-13	16	5	3.20
5	Jonathan McCarthy	Naomh Abán	1-12	15	2	7.50
6	Pat Condon	Newcestown	2-08	14	4	3.50
6	Johnny Morgan	Castlemartyr	0-14	14	2	7.00
6	Niall O'Connor	Knocknagree	0-14	14	3	4.66
9	Bobbie O'Dwyer	Urhan	1-10	13	5	2.60
9	Ronan McCarthy	Urhan	0-13	13	3	4.33

In a single game

Rank	Player	Club	Tally	Total	Opposition
1	Ciarán O'Sullivan	Urhan	1-06	9	Nemo Rangers
1	Jonathan McCarthy	Naomh Abán	1-06	9	Kilshannig
1	Podsie O'Mahony	Ballincollig	1-06	9	Valley Rovers
1	Johnny Morgan	Castlemartyr	0-09	9	Douglas
5	Noel Twomey	Macroom	1-05	8	Valley Rovers
5	Niall O'Connor	Knocknagree	0-08	8	Newcestown
7	Podsie O'Mahony	Ballincollig	2-01	7	Carrigaline
7	Tommy Walsh	Clyda Rovers	2-01	7	Douglas
7	Pat Condon	Newcestown	1-04	7	Knocknagree
10	T. J. O'Leary	Kilmurry	2-00	6	Dohenys
10	Podsie O'Mahony	Ballincollig	1-03	6	Kilmurry
10	Jonathan McCarthy	Naomh Abán	0-06	6	Millstreet
10	Liam O'Sullivan	Nemo Rangers	0-06	6	Urhan
