= Josa Lee =

Irish hurler

Personal information
- Native name: Seosamh Ó Laoi (Irish)
- Nickname: Josa
- Born: 1911 Blackpool, Cork, Ireland
- Died: 18 December 1967 (aged 56) Blackpool, Cork, Ireland
- Occupation: Dunlops employee

Sport
- Sport: Hurling
- Position: Midfield
Club
- Years: Club
- 1928-1939: Glen Rovers
Club titles
- Cork titles: 6
Inter-county*
Years	County	Apps (scores)
1932-1936	Cork	1 (0-00)
Inter-county titles
- Munster titles: 0
- All-Irelands: 0
- NHL: 0
- *Inter County team apps and scores correct as of 23:47, 7 April 2015.

Joseph "Josa" Lee (1911 - 18 December 1967) was an Irish hurler who played as a midfielder for the Cork senior team.

Born in Blackpool, Lee arrived on the inter-county scene at the age of twenty when he first linked up with the Cork minor team before later joining the senior side. He joined the senior panel during the 1932 championship. Lee later became a semi-regular member of the starting fifteen, however, he ended his playing days without silverware.

At club level Lee was a six-time championship medallist with Glen Rovers.

Throughout his career Lee made one championship appearance. He retired from inter-county hurling following the conclusion of the 1936 championship.

== Honours ==
=== Player ===
Glen Rovers

- Cork Senior Hurling Championship (6): 1934 (c), 1935 (c), 1936 (c), 1937 (c), 1938 (c), 1939

Cork

- All-Ireland Minor Hurling Championship (1): 1928
- Munster Minor Hurling Championship (1): 1928
