= 1938 Cork Intermediate Football Championship =

Gaelic football competition

- Dates: 12 June - 9 October 1938
- Teams: 5
- Champions: Bantry Blues (4th title)
- Runners-up: Dohenys

Tournament statistics
- Matches played: 4
- Goals scored: 3 (0.75 per match)
- Points scored: 25 (6.25 per match)

The 1938 Cork Intermediate Football Championship was the 29th staging of the Cork Intermediate Football Championship since its establishment by the Cork County Board in 1909. The draw for the opening round fixtures took place on 30 January 1938. The championship ran from 12 June to 9 October 1938.

The final was played on 9 October 1938 at the Castle Grounds in Macroom, between Bantry Blues and Dohenys, in what was their first meeting in the final in two years. Bantry Blues won the match by 1-01 to 0-02 to claim their fourth championship title overall, a first title in two years and a third title in five seasons.

== Results ==
=== First round ===
12 June 1938 First round	St. Columba's	0-01 - 0-06	Bantry Blues	Sam Maguire Park

21 August 1938 First round	Sarsfields	1-04 - 1-06	Fermoy	The Mardyke

- Dohenys received a bye in this round.

=== Semi-final ===
25 September 1938 Semi-final	Dohenys	0-03 - 0-02	Fermoy	Cork Athletic Grounds

- Bantry Blues received a bye in this round.

=== Final ===
9 October 1938 Final	Bantry Blues	1-01 - 0-02	Dohenys	Castle Grounds
