= 1936 Cork Senior Hurling Championship =

Annual hurling competition season

- Dates: 15 March 1936 – 13 September 1936
- Teams: 13
- Champions: Glen Rovers (3rd title); Josa Lee (captain)
- Runners-up: Sarsfields

Tournament statistics
- Matches played: 12
- Goals scored: 70 (5.83 per match)
- Points scored: 77 (6.42 per match)

The 1936 Cork Senior Hurling Championship was the 48th staging of the Cork Senior Hurling Championship since its establishment by the Cork County Board in 1887. The draw for the opening round fixtures took place at the Cork Convention on 26 January 1936. The championship began on 15 March 1936 and ended on 13 September 1936.

Glen Rovers were the defending champions.

On 13 September 1936, Glen Rovers won the championship following a 7–5 to 4–2 defeat of Sarsfields in the final. This was their third championship title and the third of eight successive championships.

== Team changes ==
=== To Championship ===
Promoted from the Cork Intermediate Hurling Championship

- Ballincollig

=== From Championship ===
Regraded to the Cork Intermediate Hurling Championship

- Nemo Rangers

Declined to field a team

- Avondhu
- Muskerry

== Results ==
=== First round ===
15 March 1936 First round	Éire Óg	3-07 - 0-00	Redmonds	Ballincollig Sportsfield, Ballincollig

29 March 1936 First round	Ballincollig	3-01 - 2-01	Carrigdhoun	Cork Athletic Grounds, Cork

19 April 1936 First round	Glen Rovers	8-08 - 4-02	St. Colman's	Midleton Sportsfield, Midleton

26 April 1936 First round	Blackrock	3-02 - 1-05 (declared void)	St. Finbarr's	Cork Athletic Grounds, Cork

10 May 1936 First round	Midleton	4-05 - 2-02	Mallow	Fermoy Sportsfield, Fermoy

10 May 1936 First round	Seandún	3-02 - 5-08	Sarsfields	Cork Athletic Grounds, Cork

24 May 1936 First round refixture	Blackrock	2-06 - 4-02	St. Finbarr's	Cork Athletic Grounds, Cork

=== Second round ===
17 May 1936 Second round	Glen Rovers	2-03 - 2-02	Ballincollig	The Mardyke, Cork

31 May 1936 Second round	Carrigtwohill	6-05 - 1-01	Éire Óg	The Mardyke, Cork

26 July 1936 Second round	Midleton	2-04 - 2-03	St. Finbarr's	Cork Athletic Grounds, Cork

- Sarsfields received a bye in this round.

=== Semi-finals ===
9 August 1936 Semi-final	Sarsfields	1-03 - 0-02	Carrigtwohill	Cork Athletic Grounds, Cork

23 August 1936 Semi-final	Glen Rovers	3-02 - 0-01	Midleton	Riverstown Sportsfield, Sallybrook

=== Final ===
13 September 1936 Final	Glen Rovers	7-05 - 4-02	Sarsfields	Cork Athletic Grounds, Cork
	W O'Driscoll 3-0; C Moylan 2-1; J Buckley 0-1; P Murphy 1-1; B Barrett 1-0; P Dowling 0-2.		M Brennan 2-0, W Beckett 1-1; J Foley 1-0; D Ryan 0-1.

== Championship statistics ==
=== Miscellaneous ===
- The first round match between Blackrock and St. Finbarr's was declared void and a replay ordered after the second half of the match ended early.
