= Charlie Tobin =

Irish hurler

Personal information
- Native name: Cathal Tóibín (Irish)
- Born: 15 September 1911 Blackpool, Cork, Ireland
- Died: 11 June 1993 (aged 82) Cork, Ireland
- Occupation: Factory Worker

Sport
- Sport: Hurling
- Position: Right corner-forward
Club
- Years: Club
- 1929-1947: Glen Rovers
Club titles
- Blackpool, Cork titles: 7 Cork Winners Medals
- Munster titles: Munster
Inter-county
- Years: County
- 1939-1942: Cork
Inter-county titles
- Munster titles: 1
- All-Irelands: 1

Charles (Charlie) Tobin (15 September 1911 – 11 June 1993) was an Irish sportsperson. He played hurling with his local club Glen Rovers and was a member of both the Cork and Dublin senior inter-county teams in the 1930s and 1940s.

== Playing career ==
Tobin joined the Glen Rovers senior team in 1937 and won the first of five successive county senior championship titles that year. Renowned as a high goal-scoring forward, he claimed a further two winners' medals in 1944 and 1945. He still today (2024) has the highest scoring record of six goals and one point in the 1940 Cork County hurling final.

Having never played at inter-county underage or junior levels, Tobin was drafted onto the Cork senior team during the 1940 Munster Championship. He was dropped from the team the following year before being reinstated in 1942. Tobin claimed a Munster Championship medal that year before lining out at left corner-forward in the All-Ireland final defeat of Dublin.

== Personal life and death ==
Tobin, who was a soldier in the Irish Army and 37 years working in Sunbeam Wolsey Cork. He was married to Ellen (Nellie) Golden. They had two sons and five daughters, Mick, Pauline, David, Margaret, Eleanor, Anne and Amanda.

Charlie Tobin died aged 82 on 11 June 1993 in Cork City.

== Honours ==
Glen Rovers

- Cork Senior Hurling Championship (7): 1937, 1938, 1939, 1940, 1941, 1944, 1945

Cork

- All-Ireland Senior Hurling Championship (1): 1942
- Munster Senior Hurling Championship (1): 1942
