= 1934 Cork Intermediate Football Championship =

Gaelic football competition

- Champions: Bantry Blues (2nd title)
- Runners-up: St Nicholas'

The 1934 Cork Intermediate Football Championship was the 25th staging of the Cork Intermediate Football Championship since its establishment by the Cork County Board in 1909.

The final was played on 18 November 1934 at the Athletic Grounds in Bandon, between Bantry Blues and St Nicholas', in what was their first ever meeting in the final. Bantry Blues won the match by 1–01 to 0–03 to claim their second championship title overall and a first title in 22 years.

== Results ==
=== Final ===
18 November 1934 Final	Bantry Blues	1-01 - 0-03	St Nicholas'	Bandon Athletic Grounds
