= 1975 Cork Intermediate Football Championship =

Gaelic football competition

- Champions: Bantry Blues (5th title)
- Runners-up: Naomh Abán

The 1975 Cork Intermediate Football Championship was the 40th staging of the Cork Intermediate Football Championship since its establishment by the Cork County Board in 1909. The draw for the opening round fixtures took place on 26 January 1975.

The final was played on 17 August 1975 at the Ballingeary GAA Grounds, between Bantry Blues and Naomh Abán, in what was their first ever meeting in the final. Bantry Blues won the match by 0-09 to 0-07 to claim their fifth championship title overall and a first title in 37 years.

== Results ==
=== Final ===
17 August 1975 Final	Bantry Blues	0-09 - 0-07	Naomh Abán	Ballingeary GAA Grounds
