= 1940 Cork Junior Football Championship =

Irish hurling competition

- Champions: Ballincollig (2nd title)
- Runners-up: Youghal

The 1940 Cork Junior Football Championship was the 42nd staging of the Cork Junior Football Championship since its establishment by the Cork County Board in 1895.

The final was played on 10 November 1940 at the Athletic Grounds in Cork, between Ballincollig and Youghal, in what was their first ever meeting in the final. Ballincollig won the match by 1–06 to 1–03 to claim their second championship title overall and a first championship title in seven years.

== Results ==
=== Final ===
11 November 1940 Final	Ballincollig	1–06 – 1–03	Youghal	Cork Athletic Grounds
