= 1928 Cork Junior Football Championship =

Irish Gaelic football competition

- Champions: Bantry (1st title); R. Keyes (captain)
- Runners-up: Mitchelstown; M. O'Brien (captain)

The 1928 Cork Junior Football Championship was the 30th staging of the Cork Junior Football Championship since its establishment by the Cork County Board in 1895.

The final was played on 2 December 1928 at the Bandon Grounds, between Bantry and Mitchelstown, in what was their first ever meeting in the final. Bantry won the match by 2–02 to 2–01 to claim their first ever championship title.

== Results ==
=== Final ===
2 December 1928 Final	Bantry	2-02 - 2-01	Mitchelstown	Bandon Grounds
