= 1933–34 Harty Cup =

Hurling tournament

1933–34 Dr Harty Cup
- Dates: 28 February – 25 April 1934
- Teams: 6
- Champions: North Monastery (3rd title); D. O'Riordan (captain)
- Runners-up: Rockwell College

Tournament statistics
- Matches played: 6
- Goals scored: 54 (9 per match)
- Points scored: 32 (5.33 per match)

The 1933–34 Harty Cup was the 15th staging of the Harty Cup since the establishment of the hurling competition by the Munster Council of the Gaelic Athletic Association in 1918. The draw for the opening round fixtures took place on 9 February 1934. The competition contested from 28 February to 25 April 1934 at the Mitchelstown Athletic Grounds.

Thurles CBS unsuccessfully defended its title against Rockwell College in the first round.

North Monastery won the Harty Cup final replay on 25 April 1934, against Rockwell College, 7–01 to 3–03, in what was their first ever meeting in a final and North Monastery's third successive Harty Cup title after a hiatus following their win in 1929.

== Results ==
=== First round ===
28 February 1934 First round	Thurles CBS	4-02 - 8-02	Rockwell College	Tipperary Sports Field

1 March 1934 First round	Doon CBS	2-05 - 3-01	Mount Sion CBS	Clonmel GAA Ground

14 March 1934 First round	Limerick CBS	2-10 - 6-01	North Monastery	Rath Luirc Grounds

=== Second round ===
17 March 1934 Second round	Rockwell College	9-02 - 2-01	Doon CBS	Mitchelstown Grounds

- North Monastery received a bye in this round.

=== Final ===
19 April 1934 Final	North Monastery	4-02 - 4-02	Rockwell College	Mitchelstown Grounds

25 April 1934 Final replay	North Monastery	7-01 - 3-03	Rockwell College	Mitchelstown Grounds
