= Connie Buckley =

Irish hurler

Connie "Sonny" Buckley
Personal information
- Native name: Conchuir Ó Buachalla (Irish)
- Nickname: Sonny
- Born: 24 November 1915 Blackpool, Cork, Ireland
- Died: 27 January 2009 (aged 93) Blackpool, Cork, Ireland
- Occupation: Ford Motor Co. employee

Sport
- Sport: Hurling
- Position: Centre-forward
Club
- Years: Club
- 1934–1942: Glen Rovers / St. Nicholas's
Club titles
	Football	Hurling
Cork titles	2	8
Inter-county
Years	County	Apps (scores)
1934–1941	Cork	16 (1–4)
Inter-county titles
- Munster titles: 1
- All-Irelands: 1
- NHL: 2

Connie "Sonny" Buckley (24 November 1915 – 27 January 2009) was an Irish hurler who played as a centre-forward for the Cork senior team.

Buckley made his first appearance for the team during the 1934 championship and was a regular member of the starting fifteen until his retirement after the 1941 championship. During that time he won one All-Ireland medal, one Munster medal and two National League medals. An All-Ireland runner-up on one occasion, Buckley captained the team to the All-Ireland title in 1941.

At club level Buckley was an eight-time county club championship medalist with Glen Rovers.

His brother Din Joe won five All-Ireland medals and a third brother, Jack, was an All-Ireland medalist as a non-playing substitute in 1942.

== Playing career ==
=== Colleges ===
It was during Buckley's secondary education at the North Monastery where his talents at Gaelic games were first brought to the fore. In 1934 Buckley was a key member of the college team that captured the Harty Cup title. When the North Mon retained the cup again in 1935, Buckley was captain of the team. That same year he captured a Munster medal with the college's senior football team. Together with his schoolmate Jack Lynch, Buckley was also chosen on the Munster colleges' inter-provincial hurling and football teams that year.

=== Club ===
Buckley played his club hurling with the famous Glen Rovers and enjoyed much success during a golden age for the club.

As a dual player in the minor grades he won a minor football championship medal with the Glen's sister team, St. Nick's, in 1932. The following year Buckley captured a minor hurling championship medal with Glen Rovers, thus beginning a great era of success.

By 1934 Buckley had joined the Glen Rovers senior hurling team and he played at midfield as the Glen lined out in only their second ever championship decider. A 3–2 to 0–6 defeat of four-in-a-row hopefuls St. Finbarr's gave Buckley a Cork Senior Hurling Championship medal. He added a second championship medal to his collection the following year when Carrigtwohill gave Glen Rovers a walkover in the championship decider.

The Glen continued to dominated Cork hurling once again in 1936. In spite of having two players sent off, Buckley won a third successive championship medal following a decisive 7–5 to 4–2 defeat of Sarsfield's.

Having been granted a walkover by the same opposition two years earlier, Glen Rovers faced Carrigtwohill in the county decider of 1937. The dominance continued and a 3–5 to 1–0 score line gave Buckley a fourth championship medal.

In 1938 Glen Rovers set out to make history by besting Blackrock's twenty-five-year-old championship record. Midleton stood in the way of a fifth successive championship title, however, a comprehensive 5–6 o 1–3 score line secured the victory and gave Buckley his fifth championship. He also collected his first championship medal in football that year as St. Nick's defeated Clonakilty.

The success continued once again the following year as Glen Rovers faced Blackrock in their first championship decider meeting in almost a decade. A 5–4 to 2–5 win for the Glen gave Buckley a sixth successive championship medal.

Sarsfield's stood in the way of Glen Rovers securing a seventh successive championship in 1940. In one of the most high-scoring county finals of all time, Buckley won his seventh championship medal following a 10–6 to 7–5 defeat of Sars.

In 1941 Glen Rovers reached an eighth successive decider. In a game that set them apart from all other teams, the Glen continued their stranglehold of club hurling in Cork by claiming the victory following a 4–7 to 2–2 defeat of Ballincollig. Buckley had the distinction of being the only player to have lined out in all eight victories. He also added a second football championship medal to his collection as Millstreet were accounted for in the county final.

Nine-in-a-row proved beyond Glen Rovers and a defeat by Ballincollig in the championship semi-final brought the curtain down of Buckley's senior club career.

=== Inter-county ===
Buckley joined the Cork senior hurling team in 1934 and was an unused substitute for that year's championship. He made his debut in the 1934–35 National League and immediately became a regular member of the starting fifteen.

In 1939 Cork made a breakthrough in the provincial championship after nearly a decade in the doldrums. A narrow 4–3 to 3–4 defeat of Limerick gave Cork the title and gave Buckley his only Munster medal. The subsequent All-Ireland final pitted Cork against Kilkenny. In one of the most iconic championship deciders of all time, played on the day that World War II broke out, the climax of which was played in a ferocious thunder storm. While a draw looked likely as the hour drew to a close Paddy Phelan sent a seventy-yard free in towards the Cork goalmouth. The sliotar was gobbled up by the defence and cleared, but only as far as Jimmy Kelly who sent it straight over the bar for a one-point lead. Immediately after the puck-out the referee blew the whistle and Cork were defeated on a score line of 2–7 to 3–3.

Although defeated in the All-Ireland decider, Cork continued their breakthrough in 1940. An 8–9 to 6–4 defeat of Tipperary in the decider gave Buckley his first National Hurling League medal. He added a second winners' medal to his collection in 1941 following a defeat of Dublin.

An outbreak of foot and mouth disease severely hampered the 1941 championship. As a result of this Cork were nominated to represent the province in the All-Ireland series. Buckley captained the team in the final against Dublin, however, it turned into a one-sided affair thanks to contributing goals from Johnny Quirke and Ted O'Sullivan. At the full-time whistle Cork had won by 5–11 to 0–6. It was one of the most one-sided championship deciders of all time, however, it did give Buckley an All-Ireland medal, as well as the honour of collecting the Liam MacCarthy Cup on behalf of Cork.

Buckley's emigration in 1942 brought his inter-county hurling career to a premature end. He returned in 1943, however, a young Cork team were attempting to capture a third All-Ireland title in-a-row. There was no place for Buckley on this team.

=== Inter-provincial ===
Buckley also lined out with Munster in the inter-provincial hurling championship where he played alongside his championship rivals from other Munster hurling counties. He played in the Railway Cup final of 1941, however, Munster were defeated by Leinster on that occasion.

== Personal life ==
Born in Roman Street on the north side of Cork city, Buckley was he fourth child in a family of eleven born to Timothy and Elizabeth Buckley. He received his national school education at the nearby St. Vincent's convent and later attended the North Monastery.

In 1942 Buckley was forced to emigrate to London where he found employment with the Ford Motor Company in Dagenham. He returned to Cork shortly afterwards. Buckley was married to Kitty Byrne and together they had seven children.

Buckley died in Cork on 27 January 2009. At the time of his death he was the oldest surviving All-Ireland senior hurling captain.

== Honours ==
=== Team ===
The North Monastery

- Dr. Harty Cup (2): 1934, 1935 (c)

Glen Rovers

- Cork Senior Hurling Championship (8): 1934, 1935, 1936, 1937, 1938, 1939, 1940, 1941
- Cork Minor Hurling Championship (1): 1933

St. Nicholas's

- Cork Senior Football Championship (2): 1938, 1941
- Cork Minor Football Championship (1): 1932

Cork

- All-Ireland Senior Hurling Championship (1): 1941 (c)
- Munster Senior Hurling Championship (1): 1939
- National Hurling League (2): 1939–40, 1940–41 (c)

Sporting positions
Preceded by Jack Lynch	Cork Senior Hurling Captain; 1941	Succeeded by Jack Lynch
Achievements
Preceded by Mick Mackey (Limerick)	All-Ireland Senior Hurling Final winning captain 1941	Succeeded by Jack Lynch (Cork)
