= 1936 Cork Intermediate Football Championship =

Gaelic football competition

- Champions: Bantry Blues (3rd title); T. Harrington (captain)
- Runners-up: Dohenys; D. Mahony (captain)

The 1936 Cork Intermediate Football Championship was the 27th staging of the Cork Intermediate Football Championship since its establishment by the Cork County Board in 1909.

The final was played on 20 September 1936 at the Athletic Grounds in Dunmanway, between Bantry Blues and Dohenys, in what was their first ever meeting in the final. Bantry Blues won the match by 2–03 to 1–02 to claim their third championship title overall and a first title in two years.

== Results ==
=== Final ===
20 September 1936 Final	Bantry Blues	2-03 - 1-02	Dohenys	Dunmanway Athletic Grounds
