= 1912 Cork Intermediate Football Championship =

Gaelic football competition

- Champions: Bantry Blues (1st title)
- Runners-up: CYMS

The 1912 Cork Intermediate Football Championship was the fourth staging of the Cork Intermediate Football Championship since its establishment by the Cork County Board in 1909.

The final was played on 20 October 1912 at the Town Park in Clonakilty, between Bantry Blues and CYMS, in what was their first ever meeting in the final. Bantry Blues won the match by 0–01 to 0–00 to claim their first ever championship title.

== Results ==
=== Final ===
20 October 1912 Final	Bantry Blues	0-01 - 0-00	CYMS	Clonakilty Town Park
