= 1933 Cork Junior Football Championship =

Irish Gaelic football competition

- Champions: Ballincollig (1st title)
- Runners-up: Shamrocks

The 1933 Cork Junior Football Championship was the 35th staging of the Cork Junior Football Championship since its establishment by the Cork County Board in 1895.

The final was played on 17 December 1933 at the Douglas Grounds, between Ballincollig and Shamrocks, in what was their first ever meeting in the final. Ballincollig won the match by 3–01 to 1–01 to claim their first ever championship title.

== Results ==
=== Final ===
17 December 1933 Final	Ballincollig	3-01 - 1-01	Shamrocks	Douglas Grounds
