= 1927 Cork Junior Hurling Championship =

Irish hurling competition

- Champions: Ballincollig (1st title)
- Runners-up: Kilbrittain; J. Barrett (captain)

The 1927 Cork Junior Hurling Championship was the 31st staging of the Cork Junior Hurling Championship since its establishment by the Cork County Board.

On 11 March 1928, Ballincollig won the championship following a 4–00 to 3–01 defeat of Kilbrittain in the final at Bandon Sportsfield. It was their first championship title.

== Results ==
=== Quarter-final ===
27 November 1927 Quarter-final	Ballinacurra	5-02 - 1-00	Carrigaline	The Mardyke

=== Semi-finals ===
22 January 1928 Semi-final	Ballincollig	v	Dromina

26 February 1928 Semi-final	Ballincollig	4-03 - 4-02	Ballinacurra	Riverstown Sportsfield

=== Final ===
11 March 1928 Final	Ballincollig	4-00 - 3-01	Kilbrittain	Bandon Athletic Grounds
