= 1917 Cork Intermediate Football Championship =

Gaelic football competition

- Champions: St Nicholas' (1st title)
- Runners-up: Fermoy

The 1917 Cork Intermediate Football Championship was the ninth staging of the Cork Intermediate Football Championship since its establishment by the Cork County Board in 1909.

The final was played between St Nicholas' and Fermoy, in what was their first ever meeting in the final. St Nicholas' won the match by 7–07 to 0–00 to claim their first ever championship title.

== Results ==
=== Final ===
Final	St Nicholas'	7-07 - 0-00	Fermoy
