= Mark O'Connor (Gaelic footballer) =

Irish Gaelic former footballer (born 1968)

Personal information
- Born: Bantry, County Cork
- Height: 6 ft 0 in (183 cm)

Sport
- Sport: Gaelic football
- Position: Full-Back
Club
- Years: Club
- Bantry Blues
Club titles
- Cork titles: 2
Inter-county
- Years: County
- 1990 - 1999: Cork
Inter-county titles
- Munster titles: 5
- All-Irelands: 1
- NFL: 1
- All Stars: 1

Mark O'Connor (born 11 December 1968) is an All Star winning former Gaelic footballer for Cork. He played football with his local club Bantry Blues in Cork and was a member of the Cork senior football team from 1990 to 1999. He also captained Cork in the 1996 league/championship campaign. He won an All-Ireland medal in 1990, and an All Star award in 1995, having also been nominated in 1993 and 1996 for consistent performances throughout the league and championships campaigns. He has also won 2 senior and 1 intermediate county championships with his club Bantry Blues.

== Army career ==
O'Connor was an officer in the Irish Army from 1987 to 1999. He reached the rank of Captain. He was part of the Cavalry unit based in Collins Barracks, Cork.

== Playing career ==
O'Connor made his debut with Cork during the 1990 season where he helped Cork to win first a Munster Senior Football Championship, and then as All-Ireland Senior Football Championship. By 1993, O'Connor was a first choice selection for the Cork team, and he again helped them to an All-Ireland final, where they were beaten by Derry. He won further Munster Championship medals in 1994 and 1995, captained Cork in 1996, and again helped them to an All Ireland final in 1999, where they were beaten by Meath. In 1995, following exceptional performances against Kerry and Dublin, where he marked Maurice Fitzgerald and Jason Sherlock, he was awarded an All Star.
