= 1937 Cork Senior Hurling Championship =

Annual hurling competition season

- Dates: 21 March 1937 – 21 November 1937
- Teams: 14
- Champions: Glen Rovers (4th title); Josa Lee (captain)
- Runners-up: Carrigtwohill

Tournament statistics
- Matches played: 15

The 1937 Cork Senior Hurling Championship was the 49th staging of the Cork Senior Hurling Championship since its establishment by the Cork County Board in 1887. The championship ended on 21 November 1937.

Glen Rovers were the defending champions.

On 21 November 1937, Glen Rovers won the championship following a 3–5 to 1–0 defeat of Carrigtwohill in the final. This was their fourth championship title and the fourth of eight successive championships.

== Team changes ==
=== To Championship ===
Promoted from the Cork Intermediate Hurling Championship

- St. Anne's

== Results ==
=== First round ===
| 21 March 1937 First round | Seandún | 5-00 - 5-01 | Carrigdhoun | Kinsale Sportsfield, Kinsale |

| 21 March 1937 First round | Muskerry | 12-04 - 1-01 | Redmonds | Ballincollig Sportsfield, Ballincollig |

| 21 March 1937 First round | St. Colman's | 3-00 - 10-04 | Glen Rovers | Midleton Sportsfield, Midleton |

| 4 April 1937 First round | Ballincollig | 2-02 - 3-07 | Sarsfields | Cork Athletic Grounds, Cork |

| 25 April 1937 First round | Mallow | 1-01 - 3-03 | Carrigtwohill | Fermoy Sportsfield, Fermoy |

| 2 May 1937 First round | St. Anne's | 1-06 - 1-04 | Midleton | Riverstown Sportsfield, Sallybrook |

| 9 May 1937 First round | St. Finbarr's | 4-01 - 4-03 | Blackrock | Cork Athletic Grounds, Cork |

=== Second round ===
| 4 July 1937 Second round | Sarsfields | 3-06 - 4-03 | Carrigdhoun | Douglas Sportsfield, Cork |

| 12 July 1937 Second round | Glen Rovers | 8-07 - 0-04 | Muskerry | The Mardyke, Cork |

| 19 July 1937 Second round | Blackrock | 1-04 - 4-06 | Carrigtwohill | Cork Athletic Grounds, Cork |

| 8 August 1937 Second round replay | Sarsfields | 4-06 - 3-03 | Carrigdhoun | Douglas Sportsfield, Cork |

=== Semi-finals ===
| 22 August 1937 Semi-final | Glen Rovers | 5-05 - 1-03 | St. Anne's | Cork Athletic Grounds, Cork |

| 29 August 1937 Semi-final | Carrigtwohill | 2-01 - 3-02 (declared void) | Sarsfields | Cork Athletic Grounds, Cork |

| 24 October 1937 Semi-final replay | Carrigtwohill | 3-03 - 3-03 | Sarsfields | Cork Athletic Grounds, Cork |

| 31 October 1937 Semi-final second replay | Carrigtwohill | 5-05 - 2-01 | Sarsfields | Cork Athletic Grounds, Cork |

=== Final ===
| 21 November 1937 Final | Glen Rovers | 3-05 - 1-00 | Carrigtwohill | Cork Athletic Grounds, Cork |
| | D Moylan 1-1; B Barrett 1-0; J Buckley 1-0; J Lynch 0-2; C Tobin 0-2. | | J Loftus 1-0. |

== Championship statistics ==
=== Miscellaneous ===
- After being defeated by Sarsfields in the semi-final, Carrigtwohill launched an objection over the eligibility of Sarsfields player John Ryan. The appeal was thrown out by the Cork County Board, however, it was later upheld after a further appeal to the Munster council and a replay was ordered a full two months after the initial disputed match. By this stage the posters advertising the county final between Glen Rovers and Sarsfields were already on display.
- Five time winners Redmonds opening round loss to Muskerry was the clubs last game in the senior championship.
