= Wellington Road, Cork =

Road in Cork City, Ireland

Wellington Road
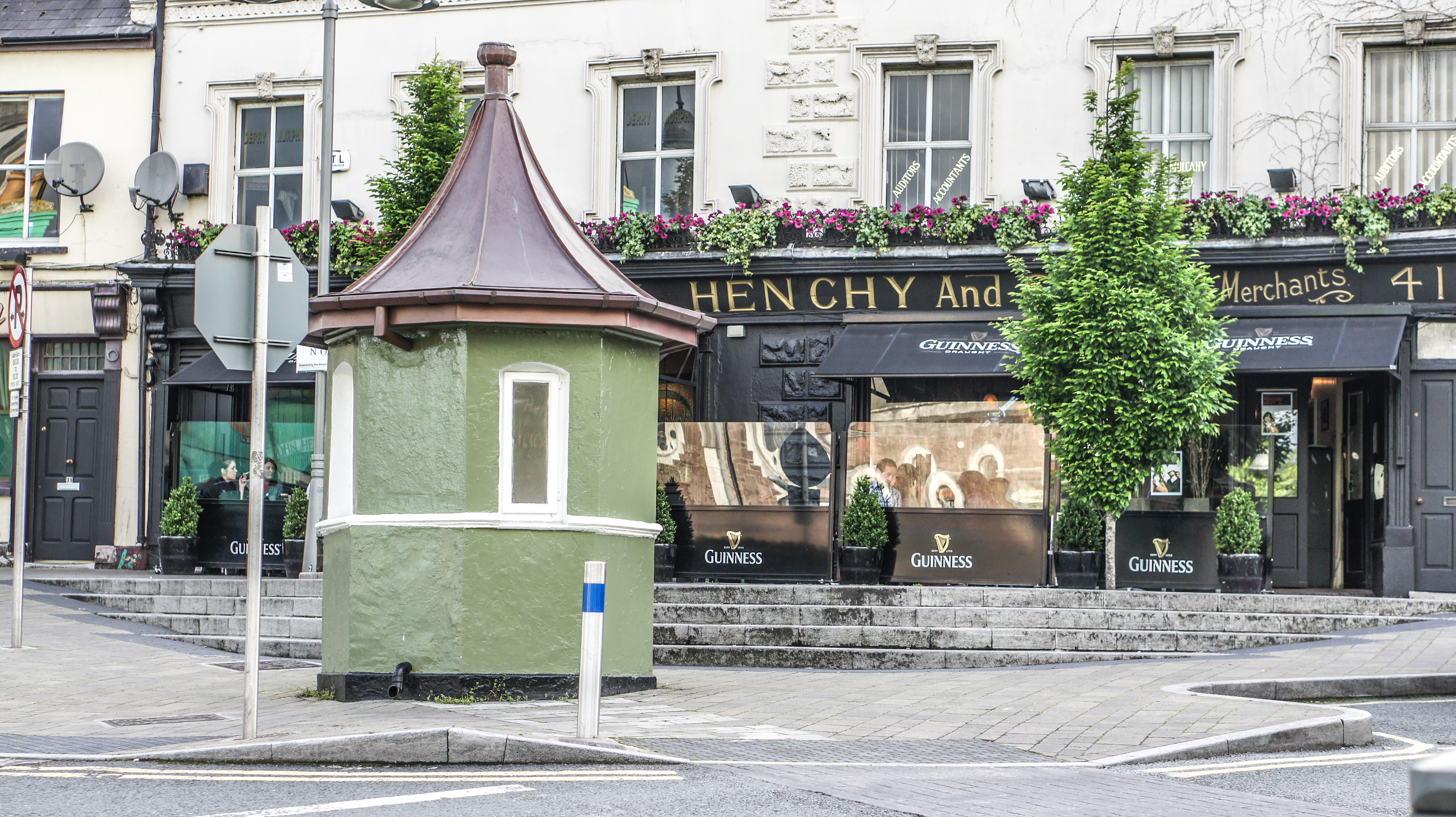
- 1880s toll house at the eastern (St. Lukes) end of Wellington Road

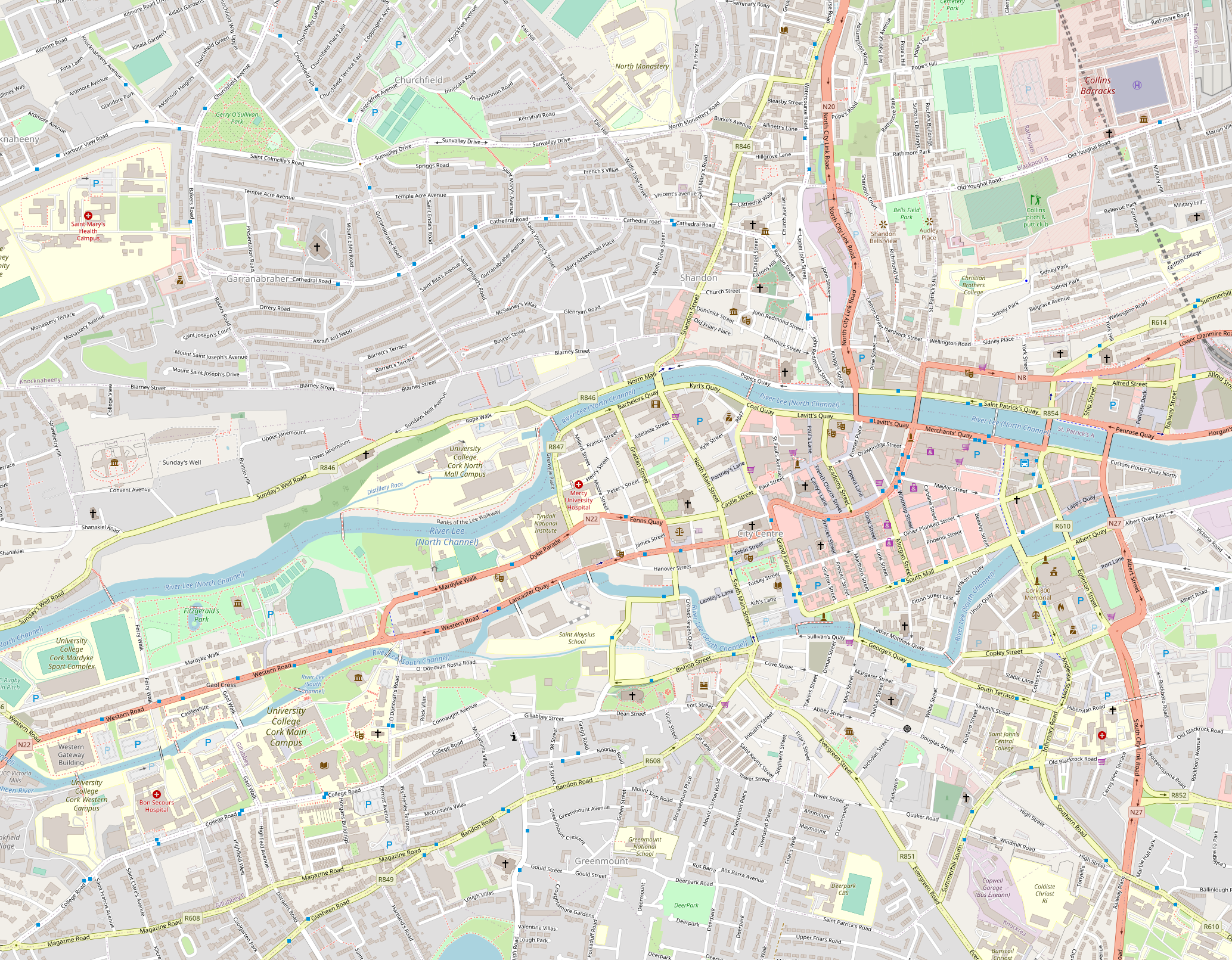
- Location within Cork Central
- Native name: Bóthar Wellington (Irish)
- Namesake: Arthur Wellesley, 1st Duke of Wellington
- Length: 900 m (3,000 ft)
- Width: 20 metres (66 ft)
- Location: Cork, Ireland
- Postal code: T23
- Coordinates: 51.9026°N 8.4638°W
- west end: St. Patrick's Hill, Hardwick Street
- east end: Summerhill North, Middle Glanmire Road, Ballyhooly Road

Wellington Road (Irish: Bóthar Wellington) is a road on the north-side of Cork city. Wellington Road stretches almost a kilometre from St. Patricks Place (off St. Patricks Hill), to St. Lukes Cross at the eastern end of the road.

Historically, Wellington Road was a relatively affluent residential area with some large houses. At the eastern end of the street, some of the houses were associated with the nearby Victoria Barracks. In the mid 20th century, many of the area's houses were sub-divided into offices or flats - a process that was somewhat reversed by the late 20th century.

There are a number of housing terraces on Wellington Road, including St. Patricks Terrace, Sidney Place, Montpellier Place, and Wellesley Terrace.

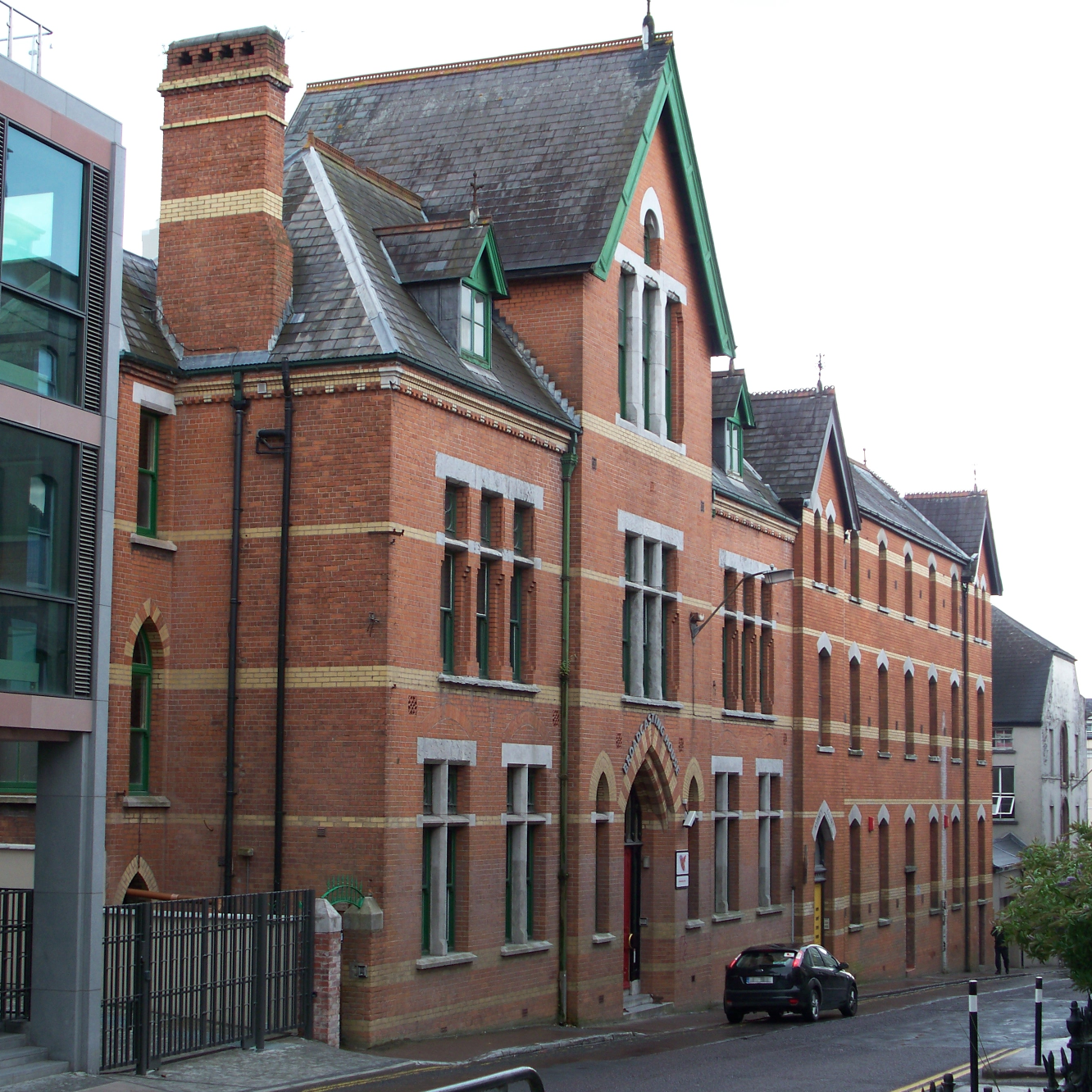
96FM Broadcasting House (former Christian Brothers College building)

Cork's 96FM is located at St. Patricks Place at the western end of the road. It is also home to an Eir telephone exchange, a hostel, several bed and breakfasts, and a primary school.

Wellington Road lies in the Mayfield Garda Station policing catchment, and spans the St. Patrick's A, B, and C wards in the Cork North-Central constituency.
