= 1940 Cork Senior Hurling Championship =

Annual hurling competition season

- Dates: 10 March 1940 – 29 September 1940
- Teams: 9
- Champions: Glen Rovers (7th title); Jack Lynch (captain)
- Runners-up: Sarsfields

Tournament statistics
- Matches played: 10
- Goals scored: 86 (8.6 per match)
- Points scored: 73 (7.3 per match)

The 1940 Cork Senior Hurling Championship was the 52nd staging of the Cork Senior Hurling Championship since its establishment by the Cork County Board in 1887. The draw for the opening round fixtures took place at the Cork Convention on 28 January 1940. The championship began on 10 March 1940 and ended on 29 September 1940.

Glen Rovers were the defending champions.

On 29 September 1940, Glen Rovers won the championship following a 10–6 to 7–5 defeat of Sarsfields in the final. This was their seventh championship title and the seventh of eight successive championships.

== Results ==
=== Divisional section ===
10 March 1940 First round	Muskerry	3-02 - 7-05	Seandún	Coachford Sportsfield, Coachford

17 March 1940 First round	Carbery	2-02 - 7-02	Avondhu	The Mardyke, Cork

31 March 1940 Second round	Carrigdhoun	2-04 - 1-04	Seandún	Douglas Sportsfield, Cork

14 April 1940 Final	Avondhu	4-01 - 5-01	Carrigdhoun	The Mardyke, Cork

=== First round ===
28 April 1940 First round	Carrigdhoun	3-02 - 10-05	Blackrock	The Mardyke, Cork

5 May 1940 First round	Sarsfields	6-03 - 2-04	Midleton	Cork Athletic Grounds, Cork

12 May 1940 First round	St. Finbarr's	1-04 - 1-01	Mallow	Buttevant Sportsfield, Buttevant

- Glen Rovers received a bye in this round.

=== Semi-finals ===
16 June 1940 Semi-final	Glen Rovers	5-06 - 2-09	Blackrock	Cork Athletic Grounds, Cork

8 September 1940 Semi-final	Sarsfields	5-02 - 3-05	St. Finbarr's	Cork Athletic Grounds, Cork

=== Final ===
29 September 1940 Final	Glen Rovers	10-06 - 7-05	Sarsfields	Athletic Grounds, Cork
	C Tobin 6-0; J Lynch 1-4; P Barry 1-0; J Buckley 1-2; D Moylan 1-0.		D Beckett 2-1; W Beckett 2-0; M Brennan 1-0; A Slattery 1-0; P Garvan 0-1; T Murphy 0-2; J Barry 1-0; B Murphy 0-1.	Attendance: 11,215

== Championship statistics ==
=== Miscellaneous ===
- Glen Rovers set a new record by becoming the first team to win seven successive championship titles.
- Sarsfields qualify for the final for the first time since 1936.
- The 17 goals is a record for a final.
- Charlie Tobin's 6-00 (18 pts) is to the date the highest individual score in a final.
- Sarsfields seven goals in a record for a losing team in a final.
