= 1935 Cork Senior Hurling Championship =

Annual hurling competition season

- Dates: 14 April 1935 – 13 October 1935
- Teams: 16
- Champions: Glen Rovers (2nd title); Josa Lee (captain)
- Runners-up: Carrigtwohill; Tom Barry (captain)

Tournament statistics
- Matches played: 15
- Goals scored: 98 (6.53 per match)
- Points scored: 103 (6.87 per match)

The 1935 Cork Senior Hurling Championship was the 47th staging of the Cork Senior Hurling Championship since its establishment by the Cork County Board in 1887. The draw for the opening round fixtures took place at the Cork Convention on 27 January 1935. The championship began on 14 April 1935 and ended on 13 October 1935.

Glen Rovers were the defending champions.

On 13 October 1935, Glen Rovers won the championship following a walkover by Carrigtwohill. This was their second championship title and the second of eight successive championships.

== Results ==
=== First round ===
14 April 1935 First round	Seandún	4-06 - 1-04	Mallow	Fermot Sportsground, Fermoy

28 April 1935 First round	Midleton	4-02 - 0-00	Redmonds	Riverstown Sportsfield, Glanmire

28 April 1935 First round	Nemo Rangers	0-01 - 8-03	Blackrock	Douglas Sportsfield, Douglas

5 May 1935 First round	Carrigtwohill	7-05 - 0-04	Carbery	The Mardyke, Cork

12 May 1935 First round	St. Finbarr's	4-04 - 4-02	Carrigdhoun	Douglas Sportsfield, Douglas

12 May 1935 First round	Avondhu	2-04 - 5-06	Glen Rovers	Mallow Park, Mallow

19 May 1935 First round	Sarsfields	3-01 - 1-02	Muskerry	The Mardyke, Cork

26 May 1935 First round	Éire Óg	1-02 - 1-05	St. Colman's	The Mardyke, Cork

=== Second round ===
16 June 1935 Second round	Midleton	5-03 - 3-02	Seandún	Riverstown Sportsfield, Glanmire

30 June 1935 Second round	Sarsfields	6-03 - 5-06	St. Colman's	Clonmult Memorial Park, Midleton

4 August 1935 Second round replay	Sarsfields	7-05 - 6-01	St. Colman's	Clonmult Memorial Park, Midleton

25 August 1935 Second round	Glen Rovers	1-08 - 0-04	St. Finbarr's	Cork Athletic Grounds, Cork

8 September 1935 Second round	Carrigtwohill	3-05 - 2-05	Blackrock	Cork Athletic Grounds, Cork

=== Semi-finals ===
22 September 1935 Semi-final	Carrigtwohill	4-03 - 1-01	Midleton	Cork Athletic Grounds, Cork

29 September 1935 Semi-final	Glen Rovers	6-04 - 4-02	Sarsfields	Cork Athletic Grounds, Cork

=== Final ===
13 October 1935 Final	Glen Rovers	w/o - scr.	Carrigtwohill

== Statistics ==
=== Miscellaneous ===
- The 1–05 to 1–02 defeat of Éire Óg by St. Colman's was their first ever championship victory.
- The championship culminated in a bloodless final or the first time since 1922. Carrigtwohill withdrew from the championship after complaining that they were not notified of the fixture according to the rules of the Gaelic Athletic Association. They also had several players injured in the semi-final and, consequently, were unable to field a representative team.
