= Sallybrook =

Suburb of Glanmire, near Cork city, Ireland

Sallybrook Sruthán na Saileach
- Village
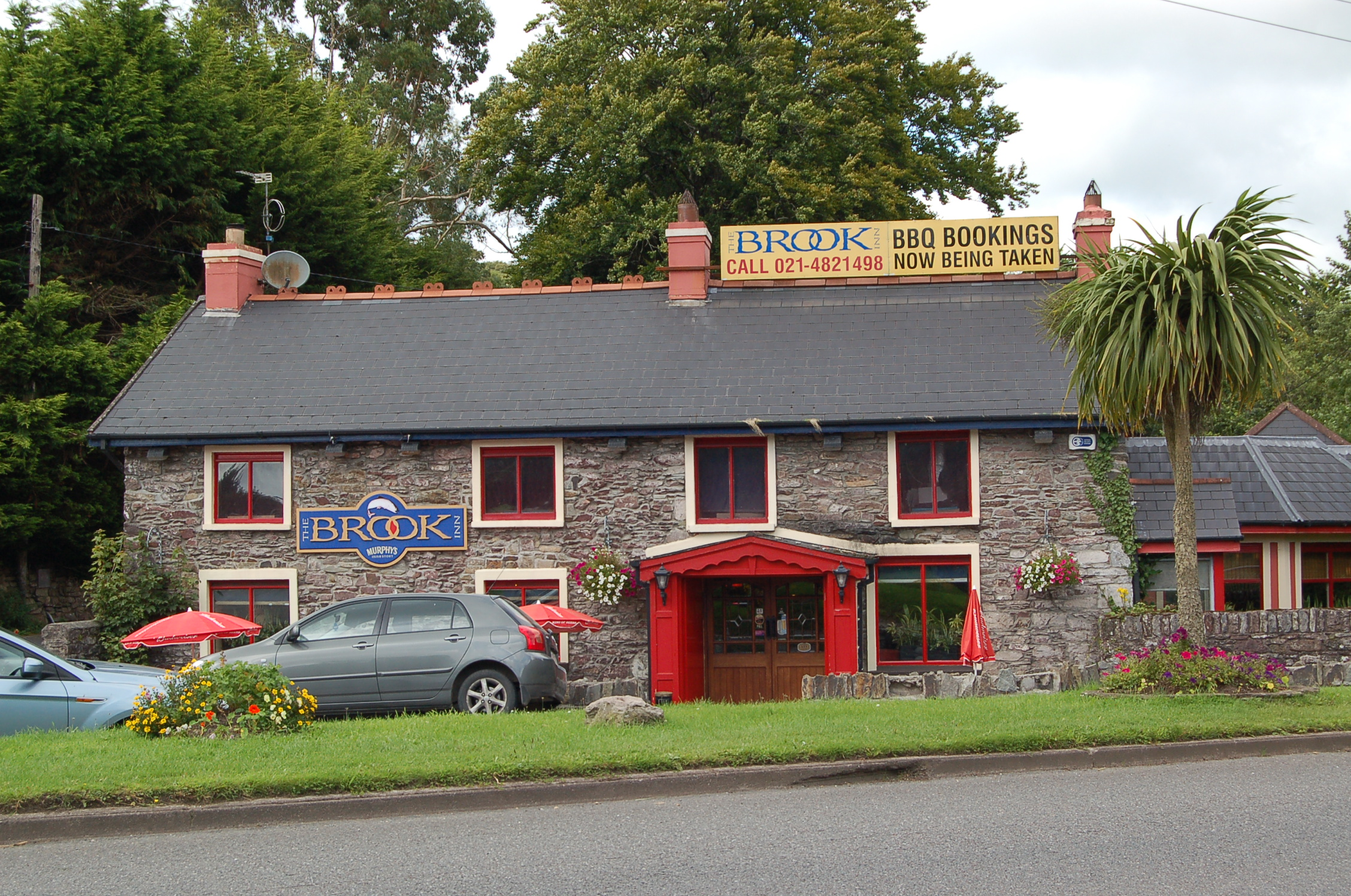
- Pub in Sallybrook

- Location in Ireland
- Coordinates: 51°56′17″N 08°23′56″W
- Country: Ireland
- Province: Munster
- County: County Cork
- Time zone: UTC+0 (WET)
  - Summer (DST): UTC-1 (IST (WEST))

Sallybrook (Irish: Sruthán na Saileach) is a residential area near the town of Glanmire outside Cork City in Ireland. It is in the townland of Knocknahorgan on the River Glashaboy (Glasa Bhuì).

== History ==
Sallybrook has twenty houses which date back over 150 years, and were originally part of the Smith Barry Estate situated on Fota Island near Cobh, in Cork Harbour. Workmen and their families were permitted to live there until the breaking up of the estate, at which point residents were able to purchase their homes.

19th-century maps show the location of Pike Mill (Dyeing) and Sallybrook Mill (Woollen) in the area.

== See also ==
- List of towns and villages in Ireland
