= St. Nicholas' GAA =

Gaelic Football club in Cork, Ireland

St Nicholas' Gaelic Football Club
- Cumann Peile San Nioclás
- Founded: 1901
- County: Cork
- Nickname: St Nick's
- Colours: Black and white
- Grounds: Glen Field
- Coordinates: 51°55′00.86″N 8°27′43.46″W

Playing kits
Standard colours

Senior Club Championships
	All Ireland	Munster champions	Cork champions
Football:	0	1	5

St Nicholas' Gaelic Football Club is a Gaelic Athletic Association club located in the Ballyvolane and Blackpool areas of Cork, Ireland. The club, a sister of Glen Rovers, is solely concerned with the game of Gaelic football.

== History ==
Located in the Blackpool area of Cork City's northside, St. Nicholas' Gaelic Football Club was founded in 1901. The club was named after Blackpool's old Catholic church of St. Nicholas. After entering a special MFC, the equivalent of the Cork JFC today, St. Nicholas' won three successive titles between 1907 and 1909. The claiming of the Cork IFC in 1917 secured senior status for the club for the first time.

St. Nicholas' won a second Cork IFC title in 1937, which was followed by the club's first Cork SFC triumph a year later. Sister club Glen Rovers also won that year's Cork SHC, which saw a number of players, including Paddy O'Donovan, Danny Matt Dorgan, Jack Lynch, Connie Buckley, Dan Moylan, and Charlie Tobin, claim a remarkable double. St. Nicholas' claimed further double titles in 1941 and 1954, when Christy Ring won his only SFC medal.

The club brought its Cork SFC title tally to five following back-to-back final defeats of St. Finabrr's in 1965 and 1966. The latter win saw St. Nicholas' subsequently become the first Cork club to win the Munster Club Championship.

The Munster title marked a high point for the club. After being beaten by University College Cork in the 1969 final, the club went into a period of decline and never again reached the final. The first two decades of the 21st century saw St. Nick's being regarded as perennial relegation candidates. A restructuring of the entire Cork football system saw the club move to the newly created Cork SAFC in 2020. Three consecutive relegations occurred over the following three years, with St. Nicholas' set to compete in the Cork Premier JFC in 2023.

== Honours ==
- Munster Senior Club Football Championship (1): 1966
- Cork Senior Football Championship (5): 1938, 1941, 1954, 1965, 1966
- Kelleher Shield (5): 1963, 1964, 1965, 1966, 1970
- Cork Intermediate Football Championship (2): 1917, 1937
- Cork Under-21 Football Championship (1): 2003
- Cork Minor Football Championship (15): 1926, 1927, 1932, 1933, 1945, 1947, 1951, 1952, 1958, 1969, 1976, 1979, 1980, 1987, 2002
- Cork City Junior Football Championship (9): 1930, 1943, 1958, 1963, 1972, 1981, 1983, 1984, 1985

== Notable players ==
- Denis Coughlan: All-Ireland SFC-winner (1973)
- Jas Murphy: All-Ireland SFC-winner (1953) with Kerry.
- Jack Lynch: All-Ireland SFC-winner (1945)
- Teddy O'Brien: All-Ireland SFC-winner (1973)
- Donie O'Donovan: All-Ireland SFC-winning coach (1973)
