= 1939 Cork Senior Hurling Championship =

Annual hurling competition season

- Dates: 19 March 1939 – 15 October 1939
- Teams: 13
- Champions: Glen Rovers (6th title); Jack Lynch (captain)
- Runners-up: Blackrock

Tournament statistics
- Matches played: 12
- Goals scored: 84 (7 per match)
- Points scored: 93 (7.75 per match)

The 1939 Cork Senior Hurling Championship was the 51st staging of the Cork Senior Hurling Championship since its establishment by the Cork County Board in 1887. The draw for the opening round fixtures took place at the Cork County Convention on 29 January 1939. The championship began on 19 March 1939 and ended on 15 October 1939.

Glen Rovers were the defending champions.

On 15 October 1939, Glen Rovers won the championship following a 5–04 to 2–05 defeat of Blackrock in the final. This was their sixth championship title overall and the sixth of eight successive championships.

== Results ==
=== Divisional section ===
19 March 1939 Semi-final	Carbery	2-04 - 9-04	Muskerry	Enniskean

19 March 1939 Semi-final	Avondhu	2-06 - 3-05	Carrigdhoun

16 April 1939 Final	Muskerry	3-03 - 3-02	Carrigdhoun	Cork Athletic Grounds, Cork

=== First round ===
16 April 1939 First round	Mallow	3-02 - 3-07	Glen Rovers	Mallow Town Park, Mallow

23 April 1939 First round	Carrigtwohill	3-06 - 1-01	St. Finbarr's	Cork Athletic Grounds, Cork

30 April 1939 First round	Midleton	2-02 - 4-02	St. Anne's	Riverstown

7 May 1939 First round	Blackrock	8-09 - 2-01	Blarney	Cork Athletic Grounds, Cork

14 May 1939 First round	Muskerry	2-03 - 4-05	Sarsfields

=== Second round ===
16 July 1939 Second round	Glen Rovers	5-04 - 3-03	Sarsfields	The Mardyke, Cork

=== Semi-finals ===
20 August 1939 Semi-final	Glen Rovers	5-05 - 1-04	St. Anne's	Cork Athletic Grounds, Cork
	P Barry 3-0, D Moylan 1-0, Tobin 1-0, J Buckley 0-3, J Lynch 0-2.		Gainey 0-2, Herlihy 0-1.	Referee: D Murphy (Innishannon)

17 September 1939 Semi-final	Blackrock	7-05 - 4-01	Carrigtwohill	Cork Athletic Grounds, Cork
				Attendance: 10,561; Referee: D Buckley (St. Anne's)

=== Final ===
15 October 1939 Final	Glen Rovers	5-04 - 2-05	Blackrock	Cork Athletic Grounds, Cork
	D Moylan 2-1; W Hickey 2-0; P Barry 1-0; J Lynch 0-2; J Young 0-1.		D O'Keeffe 1-1; P Hayes 0-1; T O'Sullivan 1-0; J Quirke 0-1; T Greaney 0-1; T Coughlan 0-1.	Attendance: 20,628

=== Miscellaneous ===
- Glen Rovers set a new record by becoming the first team to win six successive championship titles.
