= Double (Gaelic games) =

Irish county winning duo of sports championship

The Double is a term in Gaelic games that refers to a county winning the All-Ireland Senior Football Championship and the All-Ireland Senior Hurling Championship in the same year. Other major trophies won in combination in the same year at minor or under-21 levels are also often referred to as doubles. Similarly, the winning of the All-Ireland and the National League titles in the same year may also be referred to as the Double.

== The Double ==
Historically it has been unusual for counties to be strong in both codes simultaneously. Indeed, historically many counties have tended to favour one code over the other long term. Dublin and Kerry, for example, have historically dominated football, but have been weaker in hurling, while Kilkenny and Limerick are powerful in hurling, but weaker in football. Only two counties have achieved this rare distinction at Senior level, both on two separate occasions; only Cork have done so in recent times, although Galway and Offaly have both come within a single win on one occasion.

Tipperary was the first county to achieve the feat in the same calendar year. Despite Cork winning both 1890 editions, the finals for both competitions were played almost 19 months apart. A similar circumstance occurred with Tipperary's 1900 wins.

County	Edition Won	Titles won for the double	Notes
Cork	1890	Football, Hurling	The hurling final was played on 16 November 1890 and the football final on 26 June 1892.
Tipperary	1895	Football, Hurling	Both finals were played at Jones Road on the same day - 15 March 1896.
Tipperary	1900	Football, Hurling	The hurling final was played on 3 November 1901 and the football final on 21 September 1902.
Cork	1990	Football, Hurling	

== National League-All-Ireland double ==
An All-Ireland, national league double involves winning both trophies in either sports code, rather than winning trophies in different codes. As might be expected, this is a more common double.

Key

For Gaelic football double
For hurling double

County	Year Won	Titles won for the double
Cork	1926	All-Ireland Senior Hurling Championship, National Hurling League
Kerry	1929	All-Ireland Senior Football Championship, National Football League
Kerry	1931	All-Ireland Senior Football Championship, National Football League
Kerry	1932	All-Ireland Senior Football Championship, National Football League
Kilkenny	1933	All-Ireland Senior Hurling Championship, National Hurling League
Limerick	1934	All-Ireland Senior Hurling Championship, National Hurling League
Limerick	1936	All-Ireland Senior Hurling Championship, National Hurling League
Mayo	1936	All-Ireland Senior Football Championship, National Football League
Cork	1941	All-Ireland Senior Hurling Championship, National Hurling League
Cavan	1948	All-Ireland Senior Football Championship, National Football League
Tipperary	1949	All-Ireland Senior Hurling Championship, National Hurling League
Tipperary	1950	All-Ireland Senior Hurling Championship, National Hurling League
Cork	1953	All-Ireland Senior Hurling Championship, National Hurling League
Wexford	1956	All-Ireland Senior Hurling Championship, National Hurling League
Dublin	1958	All-Ireland Senior Football Championship, National Football League
Kerry	1959	All-Ireland Senior Football Championship, National Football League
Down	1960	All-Ireland Senior Football Championship, National Football League
Tipperary	1961	All-Ireland Senior Hurling Championship, National Hurling League
Tipperary	1964	All-Ireland Senior Hurling Championship, National Hurling League
Galway	1965	All-Ireland Senior Football Championship, National Football League
Tipperary	1965	All-Ireland Senior Hurling Championship, National Hurling League
Kerry	1969	All-Ireland Senior Football Championship, National Football League
Dublin	1976	All-Ireland Senior Football Championship, National Football League
Kilkenny	1982	All-Ireland Senior Hurling Championship, National Hurling League
Kerry	1982	All-Ireland Senior Football Championship, National Football League
Kilkenny	1983	All-Ireland Senior Hurling Championship, National Hurling League
Kerry	1984	All-Ireland Senior Football Championship, National Football League
Galway	1987	All-Ireland Senior Hurling Championship, National Hurling League
Meath	1988	All-Ireland Senior Football Championship, National Football League
Cork	1989	All-Ireland Senior Football Championship, National Football League
Kerry	1997	All-Ireland Senior Football Championship, National Football League
Tipperary	2001	All-Ireland Senior Hurling Championship, National Hurling League
Kilkenny	2002	All-Ireland Senior Hurling Championship, National Hurling League
Kilkenny	2003	All-Ireland Senior Hurling Championship, National Hurling League
Tyrone	2003	All-Ireland Senior Football Championship, National Football League
Kerry	2004	All-Ireland Senior Football Championship, National Football League
Kilkenny	2006	All-Ireland Senior Hurling Championship, National Hurling League
Kerry	2006	All-Ireland Senior Football Championship, National Football League
Kerry	2009	All-Ireland Senior Football Championship, National Football League
Kilkenny	2009	All-Ireland Senior Hurling Championship, National Hurling League
Cork	2010	All-Ireland Senior Football Championship, National Football League
Dublin	2013	All-Ireland Senior Football Championship, National Football League
Kilkenny	2014	All-Ireland Senior Hurling Championship, National Hurling League
Dublin	2015	All-Ireland Senior Football Championship, National Football League
Dublin	2016	All-Ireland Senior Football Championship, National Football League
Galway	2017	All-Ireland Senior Hurling Championship, National Hurling League
Dublin	2018	All-Ireland Senior Football Championship, National Football League
Kerry	2022	All-Ireland Senior Football Championship, National Football League

== Near Doubles ==
A great many sides over the years have come close to winning the senior double but failed to do so by losing one or both of the championships at the end of the season.

The full list of these teams:

- Wexford in 1890, hurling championship runners-up/football championship runners-up
- Dublin in 1892, hurling championship runners-up/football championship winners
- Cork in 1893, hurling championship winners/football championship runners-up
- Cork in 1894, hurling championship winners/football championship runners-up
- Dublin in 1894, hurling championship runners-up/football championship winners
- Dublin in 1896, hurling championship runners-up/football championship runners-up
- London in 1901, hurling championship winners/football championship runners-up
- London in 1902, hurling championship runners-up/football championship runners-up
- London in 1903, hurling championship runners-up/football championship runners-up
- Dublin in 1906, hurling championship runners-up/football championship winners
- Cork in 1907, hurling championship runners-up/football championship runners-up
- Dublin in 1908, hurling championship runners-up/football championship winners
- Wexford in 1918, hurling championship runners-up/football championship winners
- Dublin in 1920, hurling championship winners/football championship runners-up
- Dublin in 1921, hurling championship runners-up/football championship winners
- Dublin in 1924, hurling championship winners/football championship runners-up
- Galway in 1925, hurling championship runners-up/football championship winners
- Dublin in 1934, hurling championship runners-up/football championship runners-up
- Dublin in 1942, hurling championship runners-up/football championship winners
- Cork in 1956, hurling championship runners-up/football championship runners-up
- Offaly in 1981, hurling championship winners/football championship runners-up
- Cork in 1999, hurling championship winners/football championship runners-up
- Galway in 2001, hurling championship runners-up/football championship winners

== See also ==
- Dual county
- Double (association football)
