= Bantry Blues GAA =

Gaelic football team

Bantry Blues
- Gorma Beanntraí
- Founded: 1887
- County: Cork
- Nickname: The Blues
- Colours
- Grounds: Wolfe Tone Park
- Coordinates: 51°41′15.61″N 9°26′46.95″W

Playing kits
Standard colours

Senior Club Championships
	All Ireland	Munster champions	Cork champions
Football:	0	0	2

Bantry Blues is a Gaelic football club in Bantry, County Cork, Ireland. The club is affiliated to the Carbery Board and is primarily concerned with the game of Gaelic football, but also fields teams in hurling.

== History ==
Located in the town of Bantry, about 50 miles west of Cork city, Bantry Blues GAA Club was founded in 1887. The club was 25 years old when it had its first major success by winning the Cork IFC title for the first time. Bantry Blues was one of the founder clubs of the Carbery Board in 1926 and graded its first team as a junior one. Two years later, the club won the Cork JFC title for the first time. This was followed by three Cork IFC titles between 1934 and 1938.

Bantry Blues continued to win several South West JAFC titles in the decades that followed. The club's eighth divisional title in 1972 was subsequently followed by a second Cork JFC, following a 1–12 to 2–06 win over Adrigole. Two years later, Bantry Blues claimed the Cork IFC title for the fifth time in their history and top tier status.

The 1990s proved to be one of the club's most successful eras, beginning with a sixth Cork IFC title in 1993. Two years later, Bantry Blues claimed their first Cork SFC title, following a 0–10 to 0–08 win over divisional side Muskerry. The club claimed its second Cork SFC title when, in 1998, divisional side Duhallow was beaten by 0–17 to 2–06.

== Honours ==
- Cork Senior Football Championship (2): 1995, 1998
- Cork Intermediate Football Championship (6): 1912, 1934, 1936, 1938, 1975, 1993
- Cork Junior A Football Championship (2): 1928, 1972
- West Cork Junior A Football Championship (9): 1928, 1932, 1944, 1946, 1947, 1968, 1969, 1972, 1985
- West Cork Junior B Football Championship: (1): 1974
- West Cork Junior B Hurling Championship: (5): 1972, 2012, 2015, 2019, 2023
- West Cork Junior C Football Championship: (2): 1988, 2010
- West Cork Junior D Football Championship: (2): 2008, 2013
- Cork Under-21 Football Championship (2): 1993, 1994
- West Cork Under-21 Football Championship (10) 1972, 1978, 1979, 1989, 1992, 1993, 1994, 1997, 2012, 2024
- West Cork Minor A Football Championship (16): 1941, 1957, 1959, 1961, 1968, 1969, 1970, 1971, 1975, 1977, 1979, 1980, 1989, 1990, 1991, 2007

== Notable players ==
- Declan Barron: All-Ireland SFC–winner (1973)
- Graham Canty: All-Ireland SFC–winning captain (2010)
- Donal Hunt: All-Ireland SFC–winner (1973)
- Mark O'Connor: All-Ireland SFC–winner (1990)
