= Ballincollig GAA =

Gaelic games club in County Cork, Ireland

Ballincollig
- Baile an Chollaigh
- Founded: 1886
- County: Cork
- Nickname: The Village
- Colours
- Grounds: Páirc Uí Chonchúir
- Coordinates: 51°53′33.65″N 8°35′18.36″W

Playing kits
Standard colours	Alternative colours

Senior Club Championships
	All Ireland	Munster champions	Cork champions
Football:	0	0	1

Ballincollig GAA is a Gaelic Athletic Association club located in Ballincollig, County Cork, Ireland. The club is affiliated to the Muskerry Board and the Cork County Board. The club fields teams in Gaelic football, hurling and camogie.

== Foundation ==
Located in the town of Ballincollig, about 8 km west of Cork, Ballincollig GAA Club was established in 1886 and was one of the first to affiliate to the newly-formed Cork County Board. The club was represented by a Carrigrohane team in 1887. Ballincollig, along with a number of other clubs, broke away from the official County Board in 1889 and played in the O'Connor Board competitions under the name Ballincollig Gladstonians. The club returned to the official county board in 1891.

== History ==
Ballincollig's first notable success occurred in 1895, when St Finbarr's were beaten in the Bride Valley tournament. The club later fell into a period of dormancy, as the closure of the local gunpowder mills in 1903 had a severe effect on the local economy. Ballincollig GAA Club was revived in 1909. The club had its first major championship success when, in 1912, Ballincollig beat Redmonds to win the Cork IHC title.

The creation of the Muskerry Board resulted in Ballincollig competing in the division's junior championships. Ballincollig completed a divisional double in 1927, by winning both the hurling and Gaelic football championships, before later winning the Cork JHC after a 4–00 to 3–01 win over Kilbrittain. This began the club's most successful period in terms of championship victories in both codes. Ballincollig won its second Cork IHC title in 1929, with further title wins in 1934, 1935 and 1939. The club won the Cork JFC title in 1933, following a 3–01 to 1–01 win over Shamrocks in the final. A second Cork JFC title was won in 1940, making Ballincollig a dual senior club.

Ballincollig reached three consecutive Cork SHC finals between 1941 and 1943, however, they were beaten on each occasion. During that time, Ballincollig ended Glen Rovers's chance of winning a ninth consecutive title, after beating them in the 1942 Cork SHC semi-final.

After eventually returning to the junior ranks, Ballincollig won their second Cork JHC title in 1963. The club secured a return to the senior ranks in 1967, after beating Cobh by 3–08 to 3–07 to win their sixth Cork IHC title. Ballincollig won a third Cork JFC title in 1980, before making a return to the top flight of Cork football after winning the Cork IFC title in 1994. Ballincollig ended the decade by winning a seventh Cork IHC title, following a 1–14 to 2–09 win over Blarney in the final.

Ballincollig won the Cork SFC for the first time in its history in October 2024, after a 1–13 to 1–10 win over Carbery Rangers in the final. Both teams met again in the final two years later, with Carbery Rangers winning on that occasion. Ballincolling won a record eighth Cork IHC title in 2018, following a 2–16 to 1–15 win over Blackrock.

== Honours ==
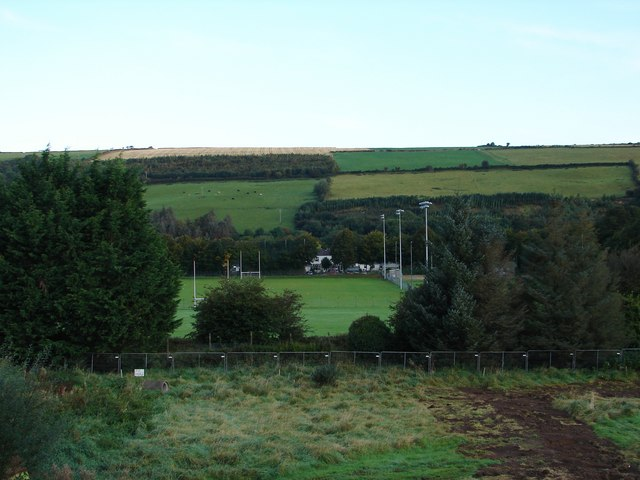
Part of Ballincollig GAA grounds (2008)

=== Men ===
- Cork Senior Football Championship (1): 2014
- Cork Intermediate Football Championship (1): 1994
- Cork Intermediate Hurling Championship (8): 1912, 1929, 1934, 1935, 1939, 1967, 1999, 2018
- Cork Junior Hurling Championship (2): 1927, 1963
- Cork Junior Football Championship (3): 1933, 1940, 1981
- Mid Cork Junior A Hurling Championship (5): 1927, 1932, 1963, 1987, 1990
- Mid Cork Junior A Football Championship (12): 1927, 1930, 1933, 1936, 1937, 1938, 1940, 1964, 1966, 1972, 1977, 1981
- Cork Under-21 Hurling Championship (1): 1996
- Cork Under-21 Football Championship (1): 2009
- Cork Premier 1 Minor Football Championship (3): 2011, 2024, 2025
- Cork Premier 2 Minor Hurling Championship (1): 2012
- Cork Minor A Hurling Championship (1): 2003

=== Women ===
- Cork Senior B Camogie championship (1): 2009

== Notable players ==
- Paddy Healy: All-Ireland SHC-winner (1943, 1944, 1946)
- Paddy Kelly: All-Ireland SFC-winner (2010)
- John Miskella: All-Ireland SFC-winner (2010)
- Dan Murphy: All-Ireland SHC-winner (1999)
- Willie Murphy: All-Ireland SHC-winner (1941, 1942, 1943, 1944, 1946)
