= 1966 Cork Senior Football Championship =

Gaelic football competition

- Dates: 10 April 1966 – 4 December 1966
- Teams: 16
- Champions: St. Nicholas' (5th title); Jackie Daly (captain)
- Runners-up: St. Finbarr's; Gus Harrington (captain)

Tournament statistics
- Matches played: 17
- Goals scored: 38 (2.24 per match)
- Points scored: 248 (14.59 per match)
- Top scorer(s): Mick Barrett (1-18)

The 1966 Cork Senior Football Championship was the 78th staging of the Cork Senior Football Championship since its establishment by the Cork County Board in 1887. The draw for the opening round fixtures took place on 30 January 1966. The championship began on 10 April 1966 and ended on 4 December 1966.

St. Nicholas' entered the championship as the defending champions.

On 4 December 1966, St. Nicholas' won the championship following a 1–07 to 1–06 defeat of St. Finbarr's in the final. This was their fifth championship title overall and their second title in succession.

Mitchelstown's MIck Barrett was the championship's top scorer with 1-18.

== Team changes ==
=== To Championship ===
Promoted from the Cork Intermediate Football Championship

- Mitchelstown

=== From Championship ===
Declined to field a team

- Garda

== Results ==
=== First round ===
10 April 1966 First round	Seandún	0-08 - 1-05	Duhallow	O'Connell Park
	D Hickey 1-0, B O'Keeffe 0-3, W O'Connell 0-1, G O'Connell 0-1.		E O'Brien 0-4, P O'Connor 0-1, D Murphy 0-1, J Clifford 0-1, J Kearney 0-1.

1 May 1966 First round replay	Seandún	1-06 - 1-05	Duhallow	O'Connell Park

1 May 1966 First round	Muskerry	2-04 - 3-09	Mitchelstown	Cork Athletic Grounds
	M Buckley 1-1, D Fitton 1-0, S McCarthy 0-2, J Sheehan 0-1.		T O'Brien 2-2, M Barrett 0-6, M O'Brien 1-0, R Honohan 0-1.

1 May 1966 First round	Macroom	0-07 - 2-12	Clonakilty	Charlie Hurley Park
	P Quirke 0-3, J Carolan 0-2, M Kelleher 0-1, M McSweeney 0-1.		Flor Hayes 1-4, J Donovan 0-4, C Lane 1-0, T Hayes 0-2, Finbarr Hayes 0-2.

1 May 1966 First round	Millstreet	1-01 - 4-06	Avondhu	Bishop Casey Memorial Park

1 May 1966 First round	Imokilly	0-05 - 0-10	St. Finbarr's	Páirc Uí Chonaill
	D O'Shea 0-3, P Lynch 0-1, JJ Long 0-1.		C Roche 0-5, C McCarthy 0-1, M Archer 0-1, T Connolly 0-1, D Murphy 0-1, Gerald McCarthy 0-1.

8 May 1966 First round	Nemo Rangers	0-09 - 0-07	Beara	Rossa Park
	J Cogan 0-5, P O'Brien 0-2, J McCarthy 0-1, G Allen 0-1.		D Mullins 0-2, E O'Sullivan 0-2, T Harrington 0-2, D Wiseman 0-1.

8 May 1966 First round	Carrigdhoun	0-03 - 2-11	University College Cork	Carrigaline Grounds
	N Sisjk 0-2, B Wylie 0-1.		PJ Gormley 1-3, D Geaney 1-0, E Philpott 0-3, P Moynihan 0-2, M Fleming 0-1, E Ryan 0-1, A Spring 0-1.

22 May 1966 First round	Carbery	0-07 - 1-09	St. Nicholas'	Clonakilty Sportsfield
	D Hunt 0-7.		F O'Neill 1-0, B Carroll 0-3, P Harte 0-2, J Daly 0-2, D Coughlan 0-1, T Corbett 0-1.

=== Quarter-finals ===
19 June 1966 Quarter-final	Mitchelstown	1-08 - 1-05	Nemo Rangers	Páirc Mac Gearailt
	J Condon 1-1, M Barrett 0-3, T O'Brien 0-2, R Honohan 0-2.		J McCarthy 1-2, D Barrett 0-1, P O'Brien 0-1, J Cogan 0-1.

19 June 1966 Quarter-final	University College Cork	3-10 - 1-04	Avondhu	Páirc Mac Gearailt
	D Geaney 3-2, E Philpott 0-4, E Ryan 0-2, P Moynihan 0-1, P O'Connell 0-1.		M Shine 1-0, R Ennis 0-1, M Cronin 0-1, S McPhillips 0-1.

14 August 1966 Quarter-final	St. Nicholas'	0-09 - 0-04	Clonakilty	Kinsale Grounds
	J Daly 0-6, D Moore 0-2, D Coughlan 0-1.		Finny Hayes 0-2, Teddy Hayes 0-1, J O'Donovan 0-1.

21 August 1966 Quarter-final	St. Finbarr's	1-11 - 1-10	Seandún	Cork Athletic Grounds
	Gene McCarthy 0-4, D Murphy 1-0, C McCarthy 0-3, C Roche 0-3, A Harrington 0-1.		P Barry 0-6, E O'Brien 1-0, M Keane 0-1, S Gillen 0-1, P Curley 0-1, J Clifford 0-1.

=== Semi-finals ===
21 August 1966 Semi-final	St. Nicholas'	1-10 - 1-06	University College Cork	Cork Athletic Grounds
	J Daly 0-5, J O'Sullivan 1-1, B Carroll 0-2, D O'Driscoll 0-1, A Flynn 0-1.		E Ryan 1-0, D Philpott 0-2, PJ Fitzpatrick 0-2, P Moynihan 0-1, E Philpott 0-1.

30 October 1966 Semi-final	St. Finbarr's	2-08 - 2-08	Mitchelstown	Páirc Mac Gearailt
	Gene McCarthy 0-6, Gerald McCarthy 1-0, M Archer 1-0, C McCarthy 0-2.		T Monaghan 2-1, M Barrett 0-4, M Burke 0-1, B Honohan 0-1, E Fleming 0-1.

6 November 1966 Semi-final replay	St. Finbarr's	2-10 - 2-08	Mitchelstown	Páirc Mac Gearailt
	C McCarthy 1-2, B Murphy 1-0, Gene McCarthy 0-3, C Roche 0-2, C Cullinane 0-2, M Archer 0-1.		M Barrett 1-5, B Honohan 1-2, T O'Brien 0-1.

=== Final ===
4 December 1966 Final	St. Nicholas'	1-07 - 1-06	St. Finbarr's	Cork Athletic Grounds
	J Daly 0-5, D O'Driscoll 1-0, D Moore 0-2.		Gene McCarthy 0-4, C McCarthy 1-0, Gerald McCarthy 0-1, C Cullinane 0-1.	Referee: F Halbert (Glenville)

== Championship statistics ==
=== Top scorers ===
Overall

Rank	Player	County	Tally	Total	Matches	Average
1	Mick Barrett	Mitchelstown	1-18	21	4	5.25
2	Jackie Daly	St Nicholas'	0-18	18	5	3.60
3	Gene McCarthy	St Finbarr's	0-17	17	5	3.40
4	David Geaney	UCC	4-02	14	2	7.00
4	Charlie McCarthy	St Finbarr's	2-08	14	5	2.80

=== Miscellaneous ===
- St Nicholas' won back-to-back titles for the first time.
