= 1963 Cork Senior Hurling Championship =

Annual hurling competition season

- Dates: 7 April – 29 September 1963
- Teams: 16
- Champions: University College Cork (1st title); Des Kiely (captain)
- Runners-up: Blackrock; Mick Cashman (captain)

Tournament statistics
- Matches played: 17
- Goals scored: 100 (5.88 per match)
- Points scored: 273 (16.06 per match)
- Top scorer: Mossie Finn (4-15)

The 1963 Cork Senior Hurling Championship was the 75th staging of the Cork Senior Hurling Championship since its establishment by the Cork County Board in 1887. The draw for the opening round fixtures took place at the Cork Convention on 27 January 1963. The championship began on 7 April 1963 and ended on 29 September 1963.

Glen Rovers were the defending champions, however, they were defeated by University College Cork in the first round.

On 29 September 1963, University College Cork won the championship following a 4–17 to 5–6 defeat of Blackrock in the final. This was their first championship title.

Mossie Finn from the St. Finbarr's club was the championship's top scorer with 4–15.

== Team changes ==
=== To Championship ===
Promoted from the Cork Intermediate Hurling Championship

- Midleton

Fielded a team after a one-year absence

- Duhallow

== Results ==
First round

7 April 1963 First round	St. Vincent's	2-05 - 1-08	Sarsfields	Cork Athletic Grounds, Cork
	C O'Shea 2-1, D Sheehan 0-1, D Joyce 0-1, T Twomey 0-1, S Quinlan 0-1.		M Kenny 1-1, P Barry 0-4, D Hurley 0-2, P Coogan 0-1.	Referee: P Cronin (St. Finbarr's)

21 April 1963 First round	Duhallow	0-06 - 4-08	Blackrock	Kanturk Sportsfield, Kanturk
	M McAuliffe 0-4, T Burke 0-2.		E Burke 1-2, W Galligan 1-2, J Redmond 1-0, T Kelly 0-1, J Bennett 0-1, M Cashman 0-1, J Hayes 0-1.	Referee: C Gyves (Mallow)

28 April 1963 First round	St. Finbarr's	7-10 - 3-03	Carbery	Kinsale Sportsfield, Kinsale
	M Finn 1-6, P O'Connell 2-1, T Cronin 2-0, M Archer 1-2, J Prendergast 1-0, M Leahy 0-1.		D O'Mahony 1-0, F O'Brien 1-0, M Donovan 1-0, L Deasy 0-2, J Crowley 0-1.	Referee: M Walsh (Mayfield)

5 May 1963 First round	Na Piarsaigh	2-06 - 3-07	Passage	Douglas
	T O'Leary 1-1, T McAuliffe 1-0, M Greaney 0-2, D Sheehan 0-1, D Daly 0-1, M Meara 0-1.		J O'Reilly 1-3, J O'Mahony 1-0, J Coughlan 1-0, J Barry 0-3, M Keane 0-1.	Referee: J Lotty (Sarsfields)

12 May 1963 First round	University College Cork	3-13 - 1-08	Glen Rovers	Cork Athletic Grounds, Cork
	M Mortell 0-5, J O'Halloran 0-4, O Harrington 0-4, G Allen 1-0, J Blake 1-0.		T Corbett 1-1, C Ring 0-3, P Harte 0-2, J Salmon 0-2.	Referee: P Cronin (St. Finbarr's)

19 May 1963 First round	Muskerry	3-13 - 2-01	Midleton	Cork Athletic Grounds, Cork
	D O'Brien 2-2, P O'Brien 1-1, J Murphy 0-4, F Sheehan 0-2, G O'Regan 0-2, T O'Riordan 0-1, B Fitton 0-1.		G Murphy 1-1, T Nagle 1-0.	Referee: N Lynam (Glen Rovers)

2 June 1963 First round replay	St. Vincent's	3-07 - 1-09	Sarsfields	Cork Athletic Grounds, Cork
	C O'Shea 1-2, B O'Neill 1-2, J Lyons 1-0, T Twomey 0-1, J Drummond 0-1, W Nation 0-1.		P Barry 1-2, D Hurley 0-3, G O'Gorman 0-2, M McDonnell 0-1, J White 0-1.	Referee: P Cronin (St. Finbarr's)

2 June 1963 First round	Avondhu	5-07 - 3-08	Seandún	Cork Athletic Grounds, Cork
	J Hogan 2-2, R Browne 1-3, R Ennis 1-0, R Carey 1-0, F Sheehy 0-1, B Honohan 0-1.		P Browne 1-1, D McDonnell 1-1, B Larkin 1-1, E O'Connell 0-2, D Kelly 0-1, P Finn 0-1, E Dorney 0-1.	Referee: L Dowling (Castlemartyr)

2 June 1963 First round	Carrigdhoun	2-06 - 6-07	Imokilly	Cork Athletic Grounds, Cork
	C Cooney 1-0, JK Coleman 1-0, D Drinan 0-2, J McCarthy 0-2, M O'Donoghue 0-1, J O'Flynn 0-1.		L Dowling 2-0, P Roche 2-0, DJ Daly 1-0, D Cusack 1-0, J White 0-3, M Meaney 0-3, T Browne 0-1.	Referee: M O'Connell (St. Vincent's)

Quarter-finals

7 July 1963 Quarter-final	St. Finbarr's	1-10 - 1-10	Passage	Cork Athletic Grounds, Cork
	J Goulding 1-1, M Finn 0-3, C McCarthy 0-2, T Cronin 0-1, P Finn 0-1, G McCarthy 0-1.		J Barry 0-5, D O'Hanlon 1-0, J Coughlan 0-2, J O'Reilly 0-2, E O'Brien 0-1.	Referee: L Dowling (Castlemartyr)

21 July 1963 Quarter-final	Blackrock	3-13 - 2-06	St. Vincent's	Cork Athletic Grounds, Cork
	F O'Mahony 1-5, W Galligan 1-2, T Dullea 1-1, J Bennett 0-3, J Hayes 0-2.		C O'Shea 1-3, DJ O'Regan 1-0, J Lyons 0-1, J Coughlan 0-1, T Twomey 0-1.	Referee: J Lotty (Sarsfields)

21 July 1963 Quarter-final	University College Cork	3-11 - 4-07	Imokilly	Cork Athletic Grounds, Cork
	D Harnedy 2-1, M Mortell 0-4, G Allen 1-0, J O'Halloran 0-3, N Gallagher 0-2, J Blake 0-1.		L Dowling 2-3, T Dowling 1-1, Bernard Ahern 1-0, J White 0-2, Brian Ahern 0-1.	Referee: P Cronin (St. Finbarr's)

28 July 1963 Quarter-final	Avondhu	8-05 - 0-06	Muskerry	Cork Athletic Grounds, Cork
	N Coughlan 3-1, R Ennis 2-0, R Browne 1-1, P Noonan 1-0, J Hogan 1-0, N Ryan 0-2, B Honohan 0-1.		M Murphy 0-3, J Murphy 0-1, G O'Regan 0-1, M O'Mahony 0-1.	Referee: M Walsh (Mayfield)

18 August 1963 Quarter-final replay	St. Finbarr's	6-13 - 0-04	Passage	Cork Athletic Grounds, Cork
	M Finn 2-5, M Archer 2-2, T Cronin 1-2, P O'Connell 1-0, W Walsh 0-1, P Doolan 0-1, G McCarthy 0-1.		C Healy 0-1, J Barry 0-1, D Hanlon 0-1, D McDonnell 0-1.	Referee: L Dowling (Castlemartyr)

Semi-finals

25 August 1963 Semi-final	Blackrock	3-14 - 3-03	Avondhu	Cork Athletic Grounds, Cork
	W Galligan 2-1, J Bennett 0-6, J Redmond 1-1, F Mahony 0-3, T Kelly 0-2, V Foley 0-1.		R Browne 1-2, R Ennis 1-0. F Sheedy 1-0, J Browne 0-1.	Referee: M Horgan

7 September 1963 Semi-final	University College Cork	4-06 - 2-10	St. Finbarr's	Cork Athletic Grounds, Cork
	J Blake 2-0, J O'Halloran 1-1, N Phelan 1-0, M Mortell 0-2, D Kelleher 0-1, G Allen 0-1, M Murphy 0-1.		M Finn 0-4, C McCarthy 1-0, M Archer 1-0, G McCarthy 0-2, W Walsh 0-1, D Murphy 0-1, M Ryan 0-1, P Finn 0-1.	Referee: M Walsh (Mayfield)

Final

29 September 1963 Final	University College Cork	4-17 - 5-06	Blackrock	Cork Athletic Grounds, Cork
	M Mortell 1-5, D Harnedy 2-1, J Blake 1-4, N Gallagher 0-2, J O'Halloran 0-1, N Phelan 0-1, D O'Flynn 0-1, D Murphy 0-1.		F O'Mahony 2-0, B Galligan 1-2, J Hayes 1-0, D O'Leary 1-0, J Redmond 0-2, J Bennett 0-2.	Referee: P Cronin (St. Finbarr's)

== Championship statistics ==
=== Top scorers ===
Top scorer overall

Rank	Player	Club	Tally	Total	Matches	Average
1	Mossie Finn	St. Finbarr's	4-15	27	4	6.75
2	Billy Galligan	Blackrock	5-07	22	4	5.50
3	Mick Mortell	UCC	1-16	19	4	4.75
4	Christy O'Shea	St. Vincent's	4-06	19	3	6.33
5	John Blake	UCC	4-05	17	4	4.25
5	Florrie O'Mahony	Blackrock	3-08	17	4	4.25
7	Mick Archer	St. Finbarr's	4-04	16	4	4.00
8	Liam Dowling	Imokilly	4-03	15	2	7.50
8	Richie Browne	Avondhu	3-06	15	3	5.00
10	Ray Ennis	Avondhu	4-00	12	4	3.00
10	Tim Cronin	St. Finbarr's	3-03	12	4	3.00
10	John O'Halloran	UCC	1-09	12	4	3.00

Top scorers in a single game

Rank	Player	Club	Tally	Total	Opposition
1	Mossie Finn	St. Finbarr's	2-05	11	Passage
2	Ned Coughlan	Avondhu	3-01	10	Muskerry
3	Liam Dowling	Imokilly	2-03	9	UCC
3	Mossie Finn	St. Finbarr's	1-06	9	Carbery
5	Mossie Finn	St. Finbarr's	2-02	8	Passage
5	Derry O'Brien	Muskerry	2-02	8	Midleton
5	J. Hogan	Avondhu	2-02	8	Seandún
5	Florrie O'Mahony	Blackrock	1-05	8	St. Vincent's
5	Mick Mortell	UCC	1-05	8	Blacrock
10	Christy O'Shea	St. Vincent's	2-01	7	Sarsfields
10	Paddy O'Connell	St. Finbarr's	2-01	7	Carbery
10	Dan Harnedy	UCC	2-01	7	Imokilly
10	Billy Galligan	Blackrock	2-01	7	Aaondhu
10	Dan Harnedy	UCC	2-01	7	Blackrock
10	John Blake	UCC	1-04	7	Blackrock

=== Miscellaneous ===
- UCC GAA become the first club since Glen Rovers/St. Nicholas' in 1954 to complete the double.
- University College Cork become the first college to win the title.
- The Seán Óg Murphy Cup is presented for the first time.
