= John O'Halloran =

Irish hurler (born 1943)

Personal information
- Native name: Seán Ó hAllúráin (Irish)
- Born: 1943 (age 82–83) Blackrock, Cork, Ireland
- Height: 6 ft 0 in (183 cm)

Sport
- Sport: Hurling
- Position: Centre-forward
Clubs
- Years: Club
- Blackrock → University College Cork; St Michael's
Club titles
	Football	Hurling
Cork titles	3	4
Munster titles	0	1
All-Ireland titles	0	1
College
- Years: College
- University College Cork
College titles
- Sigerson titles: 3
- Fitzgibbon titles: 4
Inter-county
Years	County	Apps (scores)
1963-1969	Cork	17 (2-04)
Inter-county titles
- Munster titles: 2
- All-Irelands: 1
- NHL: 0

John O'Halloran (born 1943) is an Irish retired hurler. At club level, he played with Blackrock and University College Cork, while at inter-county level he lined out with the Cork senior hurling team.

== Career ==
O'Halloran played hurling and Gaelic football at all levels as a student at Coláiste Chríost Rí. He captained the school team to the Frewen Cup title in 1960 after a 4-06 to 1-01 win over St Brendan's College. O'Halloran later played both codes with University College (UCC) during his studies there and won three Sigerson Cup medals and four Fitzgibbon Cup medals.

At club level, O'Halloran played hurling with Blackrock and was part of the team that beat Avondhu to win the Cork SHC title in 1961. A local bye-law resulted in him later having to declare for UCC, and he was part of the SHC-SFC double-winning teams in 1963. O'Halloran added further SFC medals to his collection in 1964 and 1969.

O'Halloran later returned to club hurling with Blackrock and won a third Cork SHC medal in 1971, bit later missed out on their All-Ireland Club SHC success. He claimed a fourth Cork SHC medal in 1973, before later winning a Munster Club SHC medal after a two-point win over Newmarket-on-Fergus. O'Halloran ended his club career with a 3-08 to 1-09 win over Rathnure in the 1974 All-Ireland club final.

At inter-county level, O'Halloran first played for Cork as a member of the minor team in 1961. He made his senior debut in 1963. O'Halloran won a Munster SHC medal in 1966, before later claiming an All-Ireland SHC medal after lining out at centre-forward in the 3-09 to 1-10 win over Kilkenny in the 1966 All-Ireland final. He later claimed a second Munster SHC medal as a non-playing substitute in 1969.

== Honours ==
Coláiste Chríost Rí

- Frewen Cup: 1960 (c)
- Dr Rogers Cup: 1960

University College Cork

- Sigerson Cup: 1966, 1967, 1970
- Fitzgibbon Cup: 1962, 1963, 1966, 1967
- Cork Senior Hurling Championship: 1963
- Cork Senior Football Championship: 1963, 1964, 1969

Blackrock

- All-Ireland Senior Club Hurling Championship: 1974
- Munster Senior Club Hurling Championship: 1973
- Cork Senior Hurling Championship: 1961, 1971, 1973
- Cork City Junior A Hurling Championship: 1973

Cork

- All-Ireland Senior Hurling Championship: 1966
- Munster Senior Hurling Championship: 1966, 1969

Sporting positions
Preceded by Mick McCarthy	Cork senior hurling team captain 1964	Succeeded by Denis O'Riordan
