= 1969 Cork Senior Football Championship =

Gaelic football competition

- Dates: 6 April – 26 October 1969
- Teams: 18
- Champions: University College Cork (7th title); Christy O'Sullivan (captain)
- Runners-up: St. Nicholas'; Patsy Harte (captain)

Tournament statistics
- Matches played: 17
- Goals scored: 60 (3.53 per match)
- Points scored: 261 (15.35 per match)
- Top scorer(s): Teddy O'Brien (2-20)

The 1969 Cork Senior Football Championship was the 81st staging of the Cork Senior Football Championship since its establishment by the Cork County Board in 1887. The draw for the opening round fixtures took place on 26 January 1969. The championship ran from 6 April to 26 October 1969.

Carbery entered the championship as the defending champions, however, they were beaten by St. Nicholas' in the quarter-finals.

The final was played on 26 October 1969 at the Athletic Grounds in Cork between University College Cork and St. Nicholas' in what was their first meeting in the final in six years. UCC won the match by 0-09 to 0-08 to claim their seventh championship title overall and their first title since 1964. It was their 7th championship title overall and their first title since 1964.

Teddy O'Brien was the championship's top scorer with 2-20.

== Team changes ==
=== To Championship ===
Promoted from the Cork Intermediate Football Championship

- Cobh

== Results ==
=== First round ===
11 May 1969 First round	Macroom	2-04 - 6-09	Avondhu	Castle Grounds
	J Downey 2-1, T O'Leary 0-1, S Maher 0-1, N Fitzgerald 0-1.		T Monaghan 2-1, B Honohan 2-1, B Hanrahan 1-2, J Horgan 1-1, M Burke 0-3, B McAuliffe 0-1.

18 May 1969 First round	Na Piarsaigh	1-04 - 1-10	Duhallow	Castle Grounds, Macroom
			N Collins 1-1, TD Cronin 0-3, H O'Sullivan 0-3, J O'Sullivan 0-1, T Cremin 0-1, D Cronin 0-1.

=== Second round ===
6 April 1969 Second round	Beara	0-06 - 1-06	Clonakilty	Rossa Park
	C O'Sullivan 0-2, JJ Murphy 0-2, P O'Sullivan 0-2.		TF Hayes 1-4, P O'Sullivan 0-1, P McCarthy 0-1.	Referee: F Halbert

13 April 1969 Second round	Muskerry	1-05 - 1-07	Millstreet	Castle Grounds
	N Dunne 0-4, F Cooper 1-0, S Mullane 0-1.		TJ Dennehy 1-0, J Kenneally 0-2, D O'Shea 0-2, T Burke 0-1, D Long 0-1, W O'Leary 0-1.	Referee: R Lyons (Dohenys)

20 April 1969 Second round	Nemo Rangers	3-06 - 1-05	St. Finbarr's	Cork Athletic Grounds
	J Barrett 2-0, N Morgan 1-0, M O'Donoghue 0-3, J Cooke 0-1, F Cogan 0-1, B Cogan 0-1.		S Gillen 1-5.

4 May 1960 Second round	Carbery	3-11 - 1-07	Cobh	Cork Athletic Grounds
	M Farr 2-1, B Desmond 1-1, J Carroll 0-4, T Holland 0-2, J Crowley 0-1, B Evans 0-1, J Murphy 0-1.		G Ward 1-5, M Cronin 0-2.

18 May 1969 Second round	Garda	1-02 - 1-16	St. Nicholas'	The Mardyke
	JP O'Sullivan 1-0, B Coughlan 0-2.		T O'Brien 0-8, F O'Neill 1-0, D O'Driscoll 0-3, P Harte 0-3, M O'Halloran 0-1, B Carroll 0-1.

1 June 1969 Second round	Carrigdhoun	3-09 - 3-07	Imokially	Cork Athletic Grounds
	B Wylie 0-6, C Cooney 1-1, T Sheehan 1-1, J Murphy 1-0, G Hanley 0-1.		D Sweeney 2-0, E Ryan 1-1, W Glavin 0-2, D Clifford 0-2, P Hegarty 0-1, P Fitzgerald 0-1.

20 June 1969 Second round	University College Cork	1-08 - 1-06	Seandún	Cork Athletic Grounds
	R Cummins 1-0, B Hanley 0-3, R Geaney 0-2, E Philpott 0-2, R Banbury 0-1.		B Cummins 1-1, N Keeffe 0-3, E O'Brien 0-2.

6 July 1969 Second round	Avondhu	2-10 - 2-06	Duhallow	O'Connell Park
	T Monaghan 1-2, B McAuliffe 1-1, J Horgan 0-3, M Burke 0-2, B Hanrahan 0-1, E Kirby 0-1.		TD Cronin 1-1, T Cremin 1-0, H O'Sullivan 0-2, J O'Sullivan 0-1, B Daly 0-1, John O'Mahony 0-1.

=== Quarter-finals ===
18 May 1969 Quarter-final	Nemo Rangers	2-09 - 0-07	Millstreet	Castle Grounds
	J Barrett 1-2, B Cogan 1-1, J Cooke 0-3, N Morgan 0-2, F Cogan 0-1.		J Kenneally 0-6, D Long 0-1.

6 July 1969 Quarter-final	St. Nicholas'	2-08 - 3-03	Carbery	Castle Grounds
	T O'Brien 1-4, D O'Driscoll 1-2, P Harte 0-1, B Carroll 0-1.		J Carroll 1-2, M Farr 1-1, D Hunt 1-0.

6 July 1969 Quarter-final	University College Cork	7-15 - 0-05	Carrigdhoun	Ballinhassig Grounds
	E Philpott 4-2, B Lynch 1-6, C O'Sullivan 0-5, P O'Donoghue 1-1, R Cummins 1-0, B Hanley 0-1.		B Wiley 0-3, C Cooney 0-1, G Hanley 0-1.

10 August 1969 Quarter-final	Clonakilty	3-07 - 2-09	Avondhu	Cork Athletic Grounds
	TF Hayes 2-4, B Keohane 1-1, F Hayes 0-2.		J Horgan 1-4, B Honohan 1-1, B McAuliffe 0-1, T Monaghan 0-1, N Kirby 0-1, D O'Sullivan 0-1.

=== Semi-finals ===
5 October 1969 Semi-final	University College Cork	2-11 - 1-10	Nemo Rangers	Cork Athletic Grounds
	B Lynch 2-1, B Hanley 0-4, P Doherty 0-1, R Cummins 0-1, E Philpott 0-1.		J Cooke 0-6, N Morgan 1-0, D Cogan 0-2, J Allen 0-1, J O'Leary 0-1.

12 October 1969 Semi-final	St. Nicholas'	3-12 - 0-04	Clonakilty	Charlie Hurley Park
	T O'Brien 1-4, D O'Driscoll 1-3, J Conway 1-1, P Harte 0-2, P Hurley 0-1, J Daly 0-1.		TF Hayes 0-3, J O'Donovan 0-1.

=== Final ===
26 October 1969 Final	University College Cork	0-09 - 0-08	St. Nicholas'	Cork Athletic Grounds
	C O'Sullivan 0-4, B Lynch 0-3, R Cummins 0-1, D Kavanagh 0-1.		T O'Brien 0-4, P Harte 0-2, D O'Driscoll 0-1, P Hurley 0-1.	Attendance: 11,463; Referee: J Dennigan (Fermoy)

== Championship statistics ==
=== Top scorers ===
Overall

Rank	Player	Club	Tally	Total	Matches	Average
1	Teddy O'Brien	St. Nicholas'	2-20	26	4	6.50
2	Tim F. Hayes	Clonakilty	3-11	20	3	6.66
3	Brendan Lynch	UCC	3-10	19	3	6.33
4	Eric Philpott	UCC	4-05	17	4	4.25
5	Denis O'Driscoll	St. Nicholas'	2-09	15	4	3.75
6	Jerry Horgan	Avondhu	2-08	14	3	4.66
7	Tom Monaghan	Avondhu	3-04	13	3	4.33
8	Mick Farr	Carbery	3-02	11	2	5.50
8	Jimmy Barrett	Avondhu	3-02	11	3	3.66
8	Bob Honohan	Avondhu	3-02	11	3	3.66

In a single game

Rank	Player	Club	Tally	Total	Opposition
1	Eric Philpott	UCC	4-02	14	Carrigdhoun
2	Tim F. Hayes	Clonakilty	2-04	10	Avondhu
3	Brendan Lynch	UCC	1-06	9	Carrigdhoun
4	Séamus Gillen	St. Finbarr's	1-05	8	Nemo Rangers
4	George Ward	Cobh	1-05	8	Carbery
4	Teddy O'Brien	St. Nicholas'	0-08	8	Garda
7	Joe Downey	Macroom	2-01	7	Avondhu
7	Tom Monaghan	Avondhu	2-01	7	Macroom
7	Bob Honohan	Avondhu	2-01	7	Macroom
7	Mick Farr	Carbery	2-01	7	Cobh
7	Brendan Lynch	UCC	2-01	7	Nemo Rangers
7	Tim F. Hayes	Clonakilty	1-04	7	Beara
7	Teddy O'Brien	St. Nicholas'	1-04	7	Carbery
7	Jerry Horgan	Avondhu	1-04	7	Clonakilty
7	Teddy O'Brien	St. Nicholas'	1-04	7	Clonakilty
