= Jackie Daly (hurler) =

Irish hurler

Personal information
- Native name: Seán Ó Dálaigh (Irish)
- Born: 1935 Blackpool, Cork, Ireland
- Died: August 2005 (aged 70) Wellington Road, Cork, Ireland
- Occupation: Airport employee

Sport
- Sport: Hurling
- Position: Midfield
Clubs
- Years: Club
- Glen Rovers; St. Nicholas'
Club titles
| | Football | Hurling |
| Cork titles | 2 | 7 |
| Munster titles | 1 | 1 |
Inter-county
| Years | County | Apps (scores) |
| 1956 | Cork | 0 (0-00) |
Inter-county titles
- Munster titles: 1
- All-Irelands: 0
- NHL: 0

John F. "Jackie" Daly (1935 – 19 August 2005) was an Irish hurler who played at club level with Glen Rovers and at inter-county level with the Cork senior hurling team. He usually lined out as at midfield.

== Playing career ==
Daly first made an impression as a hurler and Gaelic footballer in the local street leagues in Blackpool. He soon joined the Glen Rovers club and joined the senior team in 1956. In a 15-year club career he won seven Cork SHC titles. He was also a dual Munster Club Championship-winner and also won two Cork SFC titles with sister club St. Nicholas'. Daly had a brief inter-county career with the Cork senior hurling team. He was a reserve when Cork were beaten by Wexford in the 1956 All-Ireland final.

== Coaching career ==
When Daly's club career with Glen Rovers ended in 1971, he remained involved as trainer of the team. He guided the team to victory over St. Rynagh's in the 1973 All-Ireland club final.

== Personal life and death ==
Daly suffered a stroke in 1999 and remained in poor health for a number of years. He died at Marymount Hospice in Cork on 19 August 2005.

== Honours ==
=== Player ===
Glen Rovers

- Munster Senior Club Hurling Championship: 1964
- Cork Senior Hurling Championship: 1958, 1959, 1960, 1962, 1964, 1967, 1969

St. Nicholas'

- Munster Senior Club Football Championship: 1966 (c)
- Cork Senior Football Championship: 1965, 1966 (c)

Cork

- Munster Senior Hurling Championship: 1956

=== Coach ===
Glen Rovers

- All-Ireland Senior Club Hurling Championship: 1973
- Munster Senior Club Hurling Championship: 1973
- Cork Senior Hurling Championship: 1972
