= 1957 Cork Senior Hurling Championship =

Annual hurling competition season

- Dates: 31 March – 15 September 1957
- Teams: 14
- Champions: Sarsfields (2nd title); Mossy O'Connor (captain)
- Runners-up: University College Cork

Tournament statistics
- Matches played: 13
- Goals scored: 86 (6.62 per match)
- Points scored: 158 (12.15 per match)
- Top scorer(s): Paddy Barry (7-11)

The 1957 Cork Senior Hurling Championship was the 69th staging of the Cork Senior Hurling Championship since its establishment by the Cork County Board in 1887. The competition was held between 31 March and 15 September 1957.

Blackrock were the defending champions, however, they were defeated by Glen Rovers in the second round.

On 15 September 1957, Sarsfields won the championship following a 5–10 to 4–6 defeat of University College Cork in the final.

It was their second championship title overall and their first title in six championship seasons.

Paddy Barry was the championship's top scorer with 7–11.

== Results ==
=== First round ===
31 March 1957 First round	Avondhu	1-01 - 5-09	University College Cork	Bishop Casey Memorial Park
	P Morrissey 1-0, J Browne 0-1.		D Troy 1-6, J Dwane 1-2, S Moore 1-1, S Long 1-1, J Rabbitte 1-0.

7 April 1957 First round	Muskerry	3-01 - 2-06	Nemo Rangers	Coachford Sportsfield
	P Carroll 2-0, J Barry-Murphy 1-0, T Carroll 0-1.		G Allen 1-1, V Barrett 0-4, B Hurley 0-1.

14 April 1957 First round	Midleton	1-02 - 7-07	Blackrock	Riverstown Sportsfield
	P Fitzgerald 1-1, J Gorman 0-1.		F O'Mahony 3-1, S Horgan 2-0, J Dermody 1-0, C Hurley 0-3, M Murphy 0-2, T Furlong 0-1.

14 April 1957 First round	Glen Rovers	5-10 - 4-01	Carbery	Kinsale Sportsfield
	C Ring 4-5, J Daly 1-1, V Twomey 0-2, B Hackett 0-1, W Carroll 0-1.		D Davis 1-0, C Corcoran 1-0, D Lehane 1-0, D White 1-0, J O'Riordan 0-1.

28 April 1957 First round	Duhallow	0-03 - 7-07	Sarsfields	Bishop Casey Memorial Park
	D O'Donoghue 0-1, B O'Dea 0-1, P Dwane 0-1.		T Murphy 3-0, P Barry 2-3, L Dowling 1-0, D Hurley 0-1.

28 April 1957 First round	Carrigdhoun	4-03 - 2-12	Carrigtwohill	Cork Athletic Grounds
	T Walsh 2-1, J Kelleher 1-0, D Lordan 1-0, C Nyhan 0-1. R Sisk 0-1.		J Aherne 2-0, WJ Daly 0-6, K Tabb 0-4, M Fouhy 0-1, J O'Brien 0-1.	Referee: P O'Leary

=== Second round ===
7 April 1957 Second round	St. Finbarr's	4-02 - 3-06	Seandún	Cork Athletic Grounds
	M Ryan 2-0, M Finn 1-1, T Maher 1-0, T Cronin 0-1.		C O'Shea 2-3, D O'Connor 0-1, M Nagle 0-1, B O'Neill 0-1.

26 May 1957 Second round	University College Cork	3-07 - 2-04	Nemo Rangers	The Mardyke
	J Rabbitte 2-2, J Dwane 1-1, D Troy 0-3, S Moore 0-1.		G Allen 1-0, J Seward 1-0, V Barrett 0-2, T Brophy 0-2.	Referee: P O'Leary

7 July 1957 Second round	Sarsfields	3-10 - 2-07	Carrigtwohill	Cork Athletic Grounds
	P Barry 2-5, L Dowling 1-0, M McDonnell 0-3, T Murphy 0-1, W Walsh 0-1.		K Tabb 1-1, S Butler 1-0, WJ Daly 0-3, M Fouhy 0-3.

28 July 1957 Second round	Blackrock	2-04 - 2-08	Glen Rovers	Cork Athletic Grounds
	N O'Connell 1-0, S Horgan 1-0, F O'Mahony 0-2, J Bennett 0-2.		B Hackett 1-0, C Moynihan 1-0, E Goulding 0-2, P Healy 0-2, J Clifford 0-2, S Kennefick 0-1, M Cullinane 0-1.	Attendance: 14,000; Referee: M Walsh

=== Semi-finals ===
25 August 1957 Semi-final	Sarsfields	6-09 - 1-02	Seandún	Cork Athletic Grounds
	M McDonnell 2-1, L Dowling 1-4, P Barry 1-1, J Hayes 1-1, R Lotty 1-0, T Murphy 0-2.		J O'Neill 1-0, P O'Rourke 0-2.

1 September 1957 Semi-final	University College Cork	4-11 - 4-10	Glen Rovers	Cork Athletic Grounds
	J Rabbitte 2-0, G McCarthy 1-3, R Troy 0-5, L Shalloe 0-1, S Long 0-1, J Dwane 0-1.		J Daly 2-1, B Hackett 2-1, S Kennefick 0-2, E Goulding 0-1, C Moynihan 0-1, J Clifford 0-1, P Healy 0-1.

=== Final ===
15 September 1957 Final	Sarsfields	5-10 - 4-06	University College Cork	Athletic Grounds, Cork
	P Barry 2-2, R Lotty 2-1, L Dowling 1-0, D Hurley 0-2, T Murphy 0-2, W Barry 0-1, M McDonnell 0-1, W Walsh 0-1.		G McCarthy 2-0, R Troy 1-3, T Hassett 1-0, J Rabbitte 0-2, J Moore 0-1.	Referee: C Conway (Blarney)

== Championship statistics ==
=== Top scorers ===
Top scorer overall

Rank	Player	Club	Tally	Total	Matches	Average
1	Paddy Barry	Sarsfields	7-11	32	4	8.00
2	Dick Troy	UCC	2-17	23	4	5.75
3	Joe Rabbitte	UCC	5-04	19	4	4.75
4	Christy Ring	Glen Rovers	4-05	17	1	17.00
5	Liam Dowling	Sarsdfields	4-04	16	4	4.00
6	Jackie Daly	Glen Rovers	3-05	14	3	4.66
6	Tim Murphy	Sarsfields	3-05	14	4	3.50
8	Florrie O'Mahony	Blackrock	3-03	12	2	6.00
8	Gerry McCarthy	UCC	3-03	12	4	3.00
10	Bernie Hackett	Glen Rovers	3-02	11	3	3.66
10	Mick McDonnell	Sarsdfields	2-05	11	4	2.75

Top scorers in a single game

Rank	Player	Club	Tally	Total	Opposition
1	Christy Ring	Glen Rovers	4-05	17	Carbery
2	Paddy Barry	Sarsfields	2-05	11	Carrigtwohill
3	Florrie O'Mahony	Blackrock	3-01	10	Midleton
4	Tim Murphy	Sarsfields	3-00	9	Duhallow
4	Christy O'Shea	Seandún	2-03	9	St. Finbarr's
4	Dick Troy	UCC	1-06	9	Avondhu
7	Paddy Barry	Sarsfields	2-02	8	UCC
7	Joe Rabbitte	UCC	2-02	8	Nemo Rangers
9	Tim Walsh	Carrigdhoun	2-01	7	Carrigtwohill
9	Mick McDonnell	Sarsdfields	2-01	7	Seandún
9	Jackie Daly	Glen Rovers	2-01	7	UCC
9	Bernie Hackett	Glen Rovers	2-01	7	UCC
9	Robbie Lotty	Sarsdfields	2-01	7	UCC
9	Liam Dowling	Sarsdfields	1-04	7	Seandún

=== Miscellaneous ===
- The final is the first since 1928 to not future a city club.
- University College Cork, then known as Collegians, qualify for the final for the first time since 1915.
- Seandún qualify for the semi-final for the first time since 1934.
