= Jimmy Brohan =

Irish sportsperson (1935–2023)

Personal information
- Native name: Séamus Ó Bruacháin (Irish)
- Nickname: Prince of corner backs
- Born: 18 June 1935 Ballintemple, Cork, Ireland
- Died: 19 September 2023 (aged 88) Curraheen Road, Cork, Ireland
- Occupation: Customs official
- Height: 5 ft 11 in (180 cm)

Sport
- Sport: Hurling
- Position: Left corner-back
Club
- Years: Club
- 1953–1973: Blackrock
Club titles
- Cork titles: 2
Inter-county
Years	County	Apps (scores)
1953–1964	Cork	19 (0-00)
Inter-county titles
- Munster titles: 2
- All-Irelands: 1
- NHL: 0

James Brohan (18 June 1935 – 19 September 2023) was an Irish sportsperson. He played hurling with his local club Blackrock and was a member of the Cork senior inter-county team from 1954 until 1963.

== Early life ==
Born in Ballintemple, Brohan, the middle child in a family of seven, grew up in Blackrock after the family moved there in 1939. Two of his brothers played soccer in the League of Ireland with Evergreen United and Cork Hibernians. His father was born in Fethard, County Tipperary but moved to Cork and worked in the Metropole Hotel.

Brohan first played hurling and Gaelic football as a schoolboy at Sullivan's Quay CBS. He played on the school's Harty Cup team for a number of years, beginning as a goalkeeper but later becoming an outfield player. He was full-forward on the Sullivan's Quay Harty Cup team that beat the North Monastery in 1951 before losing the final to Thurles CBS. Brohan's performances earned his inclusion on the Munster Colleges inter-provincial team, and he won consecutive All-Ireland titles in this competition in 1952 and 1953.

== Club career ==
Brohan first played hurling at club level when he took part in the parish leagues run by the Blackrock National Hurling Club. While there were very few competitive juvenile matches, he was selected to play in goal for the Blackrock minor team as a 14-year-old in 1949. In his fifth and final year in the minor grade in 1953, Brohan was part of the Blackrock team that won the City MHC title for the first time, before later being beaten by Sarsfields in the county final. He also made his senior team debut that year.

After losing the 1954 Cork SHC final to Glen Rovers, Brohan was part of the Blackrock team that won a first Cork SHC in 25 years following a 2–10 to 2–02 win over the Glen in the 1956 final. He also achieved success in Gaelic football that year, when sister club St Michael's beat Dromtarriffe to win the Cork JFC title. Brohan was appointed team captain for the 1959 Cork SHC, however, Blackrock's season ended with a 3–11 to 3–05 defeat by Glen Rovers in the final.

Blackrock were back in a fourth final in 1961, with Brohan collecting a second winners' medal after the 4–10 to 3–07 defeat of Avondhu. His last big occasion with Blackrock was their 1963 final defeat by University College Cork. Brohan brought his senior club career to an end shortly after winning a Cork IFC medal following St Michael's defeat of Dohenys in 1969. He continued to line out in goal with the Blackrock junior team until 1973.

== Inter-county career ==
Brohan began his inter-county career with Cork as a member of the minor team in 1952. His two-year tenure with the team ended with semi-final defeats by Tipperary. He immediately progressed to the senior team and made his first appearances during the 1953–54 National League. Brohan made his championship debut as a replacement for the injured Tony O'Shaughnessy in the 1954 All-Ireland semi-final defeat of Galway. The injured O'Shaughnessy returned for the subsequent All-Ireland final, with Brohan claiming a winners' medal as a substitute after the 1–09 to 1–06 defeat of Wexford.

Brohan was suspended from all GAA activity in 1955 after being selected for the Seandún divisional football team and failing to turn up. He returned to the Cork senior team as first-choice right corner-back the following year and won his first Munster SHC medal on the field of play after a defeat of Limerick in the final. Brohan was later denied a second All-Ireland winners' medal when Wexford beat Cork by 2–14 to 2–08 in the 1956 All-Ireland final.

As a dual player in 1957, Brohan won a Munster JFC medal after a 1–07 to 0–07 defeat of Limerick. Cork were later beaten by Mayo in the All-Ireland home final. The second half of Brohan's inter-county hurling career was characterised by a downturn in Cork's fortunes. There were five Munster final defeats between 1957 and 1964, however, there were some personal highlights when he was included on a Sunday Review best hurling team of the year selection in 1958, while a Gael Linn-sponsored poll in the Irish Independent in 1961 named him in the right corner-back position on a hurling team considered to be the best ever. Brohan made his last appearance for Cork as a substitute in 1964.

== Inter-provincial ==
Brohan's performances at inter-county level made him an automatic selection for the Munster inter-provincial team between 1957 and 1963. His first five years with the team yielded five successive Railway Cup victories. After a defeat by Leinster in 1962, Brohan claimed a sixth and final Railway Cup medal in 1963.

== Post-playing career ==
Following his retirement as a player Brohan became involved as a selector with the county hurling team. He was involved with the teams that won the All-Ireland titles in 1976, 1977, 1978 and 1986. In the latter year Brohan had the pleasure of seeing his nephew, Tom Cashman, captain Cork to victory.

== Personal life and death ==
After leaving Sullivan's Quay in 1953 Brohan worked at the Dunlop's tyre centre in Cork until its closure in 1983. Other Cork greats who also worked there included Johnny Clifford and Willie Murphy. Brohan later worked with the Customs Service until his retirement in 2000.

Brohan died on 19 September 2023, at the age of 88.

== Honours ==
=== Player ===
St Michael's

- Cork Intermediate Football Championship: 1969
- Cork Junior Football Championship: 1956

Blackrock

- Cork Senior Hurling Championship: 1956, 1961
- City Minor Hurling Championship: 1953

Cork

- All-Ireland Senior Hurling Championship: 1954
- Munster Senior Hurling Championship: 1954, 1956
- Munster Junior Football Championship: 1957

Munster

- Railway Cup: 1957, 1958, 1959, 1960, 1961, 1963
- All-Ireland Colleges Interprovincial Hurling Championship: 1952, 1953

=== Management ===
Blackrock

- Cork Senior Hurling Championship: 1971, 1973

Cork

- All-Ireland Senior Hurling Championship: 1976, 1977, 1978, 1986
- Munster Senior Hurling Championship: 1976, 1977, 1978, 1979, 1986
- Munster Minor Hurling Championship: 1990
