= Jas Murphy =

Irish Gaelic footballer (1923–2021)

Personal information
- Native name: Séamus Ó Murchú (Irish)
- Nickname: Jas
- Born: 30 May 1923 Tralee, County Kerry, Ireland
- Died: 1 December 2021 (aged 98) Douglas Road, Cork, Ireland
- Occupation: Garda Síochána
- Height: 6 ft 1 in (185 cm)

Sport
- Sport: Gaelic football
- Position: Right corner-back
Clubs
- Years: Club
- Kerins O'Rahilly's; St. Nicholas'; Garda
Club titles
- Cork titles: 1
Inter-county
Years	County	Apps (scores)
1947–1948 1949–1954	Cork; Kerry	3 (0–00); 16 (0–00)
Inter-county titles
- Munster titles: 2
- All-Irelands: 1
- NFL: 0

James Murphy (30 May 1923 – 1 December 2021), better known as Jas Murphy, was an Irish Gaelic footballer. He played at club level with Garda and at inter-county level with the Cork and Kerry senior football teams. He captained Kerry to the 1953 All-Ireland Championship.

== Career ==
Murphy first played Gaelic football with the Kerins O'Rahilly's club in Tralee. He later lined out with the Garda club in Cork and was part of their 1950 County Championship-winning team. Murphy first appeared on the inter-county scene after declaring for the Cork senior football team. After two seasons with his adopted team, he subsequently joined the Kerry senior football team in 1949. Murphy won the first of two Munster Championship titles in 1950 and assumed the team captaincy for the 1953 All-Ireland final after Paudie Sheehy was dropped from the team. He ended the game with a winners' medal and lifted the Sam Maguire Cup after the defeat of Armagh. Murphy himself was dropped from the team before the 1954 Munster final.

== Personal life ==
Born in Tralee, County Kerry, Murphy was the son of RIC double agent Jim Murphy. After joining the Garda Síochána, he eventually reached the rank of Detective Garda and was based in Union Quay in Cork from 1943 until his retirement in 1985.

Murphy died on 1 December 2021, at the age of 98.

== Honours ==
Garda

- Cork Senior Football Championship: 1950

Kerry

- All-Ireland Senior Football Championship: 1953 (c)
- Munster Senior Football Championship: 1950, 1953 (c)

Sporting positions
Preceded by Paudie Sheehy	Kerry Senior Football Captain; 1953	Succeeded by Mick Murphy
Achievements
Preceded by Mick Higgins	All-Ireland Senior Football Final winning captain 1953	Succeeded by Peter McDermott
