= 1958 Cork Senior Hurling Championship =

Annual hurling competition season

- Dates: 23 March – 21 September 1958
- Teams: 14
- Champions: Glen Rovers (16th title); John Lyons (captain)
- Runners-up: St. Finbarr's; Mick Ryan (captain)

Tournament statistics
- Matches played: 13
- Goals scored: 104 (8 per match)
- Points scored: 159 (12.23 per match)
- Top scorer(s): Christy Ring (7-11)

The 1958 Cork Senior Hurling Championship was the 70th staging of the Cork Senior Hurling Championship since its establishment by the Cork County Board in 1887. The draw for the opening round fixtures took place at the Cork Convention on 26 January 1958. The championship began on 23 March 1958 and ended on 21 September 1958.

Sarsfields entered the championship as the defending champions, however, they were defeated by Glen Rovers in the semi-final.

The final was played on 21 September 1958 at the Athletic Grounds in Cork, between Glen Rovers and St. Finbarr's, in what was their sixth ever meeting in the final and a first in three years. Glen Rovers won the match by 4–06 to 3–05 to claim their 16th championship title overall and a first title in four years.

Christy Ring was the championship's top scorer with 7–11.

== Team changes ==
=== From Championship ===
Regraded to the Cork Intermediate Hurling Championship

- Nemo Rangers

== Results ==
=== First round ===
23 March 1958 First round	Avondhu	2-03 - 7-06	University College Cork	Bishop Casey Memorial Park, Mallow
	J O'Sullivan 1-1, D Murphy 1-0, W Galligan 0-1, S Ryall 0-1.		J McCarthy 2-2, J Rabbitte 1-0, J Hassett 1-0, JJ Browne 1-0, S Long 1-0, T Gallagher 1-0, R Troy 0-2, P O'Shea 0-1, P Henchy 0-1.	Referee: M Walsh (Mayfield)

13 April 1958 First round	Sarsfields	7-08 - 2-03	Duhallow	Bishop Casey Memorial Park, Mallow
	J Coleman 3-0, L Dowling 2-0, P Barry 1-3, J Hayes 1-3, R Lotty 0-1, M Brennan 0-1,		P Twohig 1-0, L O'Dea 0-1, D Fitzgerald 0-1, J O'Connell 0-1.	Referee: D O'Donovan (Mallow)

13 April 1958 First round	Carrigdhoun	4-07 - 6-03	Muskerry	Ballinhassig Sportsfield, Ballinhassig
	T Walsh 2-0, D Deasy 1-1, C Nyhan 1-0, T Kelly 0-2, S Kelly 0-2, J Deasy 0-1, M Hickey 0-1.		D O'Connor 2-0, P Carroll 1-1, F Sheehan 1-0, DJ O'Sullivan 1-0, J Barry-Murphy 1-0, T O'Riordan 0-1, F Kenneally 0-1	Referee: P O'Leary

9 May 1958 First round	Seandún	1-04 - 2-03	Na Piarsaigh	The Mardyke, Cork
	B O'Neill 1-1, G Allen 0-2, K O'Neill 0-1.		T Walsh 2-0, T Coughlan 0-2, M McGowan 0-1.

11 May 1958 First round	Glen Rovers	7-10 - 3-06	Imokilly	Riverstown
	C Ring 5-4, J Twomey 1-1, F Daly 1-0, J Daly 0-2, E Goulding 0-1, M Quane 0-1, G O'Sullivan 0-1.		M O'Brien 1-2, D O'Brien 1-0, P Dolan 1-0, S Butler 0-3, B Cotter 0-1.	Referee: M Walsh (Mayfield)

25 May 1958 First round	Blackrock	1-10 - 3-09	St. Finbarr's	Cork Athletic Grounds, Cork
	T Furlong 0-1, Murphy 0-1, Horgan 1-3, M Murphy 0-3, D Murphy 0-1,		Cronin 0-1, P Finn 1-2, Maher 0-3, M Finn 0-1, Doolin 0-1, McCarthy 1-0,	Attendance: 11,311; Referee: C Conway (Blarney)

=== Quarter-finals ===
27 April 1958 Quarter-final	Carrigtwohill	6-09 - 5-03	Carbery	Cork Athletic Grounds, Cork
	P Roche 3-0, E Roche 2-2, M Fouhy 0-5, W Moore 0-2.		D Driscoll 3-0, G Corcoran 2-1, L Deasy 0-2.	Referee: M Walsh (Mayfield)

29 June 1958 Quarter-final	Muskerry	2-02 - 6-06	St. Finbarr's	Ballincollig Sportsfield, Ballincollig
	J Barry-Murphy 1-1, D Maher 1-0, M McAuliffe 0-1.		T Cronin 2-0, M Finn 1-3, P Finn 1-2, L McGrath 1-1, T Maher 1-0.	Referee: D Owens (Glen Rovers)

4 July 1958 Quarter-final	University College Cork	4-06 - 10-07	Glen Rovers	The Mardyke, Cork
	J McCarthy 2-4, J Rabbit 1-0, J Hassett 1-0, R Troy 0-1, S Long 0-1.		J Daly 2-4, M Quane 3-0, C Ring 2-1, F Daly 2-0, W Carroll 1-1, E Goulding 0-1.

11 July 1958 Quarter-final	Na Piarsaigh	2-05 - 6-07	Sarsfields	The Mardyke, Cork
	M Nagle 1-0, T O'Leary 1-0, D Gould 0-3, S McGrath 0-1, D Kearney 0-1.		L Dowling 2-1, M McDonald 2-0, B Lotty 1-2, P Barry 1-2, W Walsh 0-1, J Hayes 0-1.

=== Semi-finals ===
31 August 1958 Semi-final	Glen Rovers	3-14 - 5-01	Sarsfields	Cork Athletic Grounds, Cork
	M Quane 2-1, C Ring 0-6, J Daly 1-2, W Carroll 0-5.		P Dowling 4-0, J Hayes 1-0, P Barry 0-1.	Referee: C Conway (Blarney)

7 September 1958 Semi-final	St. Finbarr's	2-09 - 1-07	Carrigtwohill	Cork Athletic Grounds, Cork
	T Cronin 2-0, M Finn 0-4, T Maher 0-3, D Driscoll 0-1, E Murphy 0-1.		E Roche 1-3, D Neville 0-2, P Hartnett 0-1, J O'Brien 0-1.

=== Final ===
21 September 1958 Final	Glen Rovers	4-06 - 3-05	St. Finbarr's	Cork Athletic Grounds, Cork
	F Daly 2-0; N Lynam 1-2; P Healy 1-1; E Goulding 0-1; J Daly 0-2.		T Maher 1-0; D Hurley 1-0; W Walsh 1-0; M Finn 0-4; B Murphy 0-1.	Attendance: 20,657

== Championship statistics ==
=== Top scorers ===
Top scorers overall

Rank	Player	Club	Tally	Total	Matches	Average
1	Christy Ring	Glen Rovers	7-11	32	3	10.66
2	Jackie Daly	Glen Rovers	3-10	19	4	4.75
3	Jerry McCarthy	UCC	4-06	18	2	9.00
4	Mick Quane	Glen Rovers	5-02	17	4	4.25
5	Frank Daly	Glen Rovers	5-00	15	4	3.75
5	Mossie Finn	St. Finbarr's	1-12	15	4	3.75
7	Eddie Roche	Carrigtwohill	3-05	14	2	7.00
8	Liam Dowling	Sarsfields	4-01	13	3	4.33
8	Timmy Cronin	St. Finbarr's	4-01	13	3	4.33
10	Pat Dowling	Sarsfields	4-00	12	1	12.00
10	Paddy Barry	Sarsfields	2-06	12	3	4.00

Top scorers in a single game

Rank	Player	Club	Tally	Total	Opposition
1	Christy Ring	Glen Rovers	5-04	19	Imokilly
2	Pat Dowling	Sarsfields	4-00	12	Glen Rovers
3	Jackie Daly	Glen Rovers	2-04	10	UCC
3	Jerry McCarthy	UCC	2-04	10	Glen Rovers
5	Mick Quane	Glen Rovers	3-00	9	UCC
5	Jim Coleman	Sarsfields	3-00	9	Duhallow
5	Paddy Roche	Carrigtwohill	3-00	9	Carbery
5	Denis Driscoll	Carbery	3-00	9	Carrigtwohill
9	Jerry McCarthy	UCC	2-02	8	Avondhu
9	Eddie Roche	Carrigtwohill	2-02	8	Carbery

=== Miscellaneous ===
- Na Piarsaigh make their first appearance at senior level.
