= 1965 Cork Senior Football Championship =

77th staging since Cork Country Board established it in 1887

- Dates: 11 April 1965 – 14 November 1965
- Teams: 16
- Champions: St. Nicholas' (4th title); John Joe Kelly (captain)
- Runners-up: St. Finbarr's

Tournament statistics
- Matches played: 15
- Goals scored: 36 (2.4 per match)
- Points scored: 241 (16.07 per match)
- Top scorer: Dan Harnedy (0-17)

The 1965 Cork Senior Football Championship was the 77th staging of the Cork Senior Football Championship since its establishment by the Cork County Board in 1887. The draw for the opening round fixtures took place on 31 January 1965. The championship began on 11 April 1965 and ended on 14 November 1965.

University College Cork entered the championship as the defending champions, however, they were beaten by St. Nicholas' in the semi-final.

On 14 November 1965, St. Nicholas' won the championship following a 2-04 to 0-06 defeat of St. Finbarr's in the final. This was their fourth championship title and their first title since 1954. St. Nicholas' were captained by John Joe Kelly, and their victory ended an 11-year wait since their previous Cork senior football championship in 1954.

University College Cork's Dan Harnedy was the championship's top scorer with 0-17.

== Results ==
=== First round ===
11 April 1965 First round	Muskerry	1-04 - 2-08	St. Finbarr's	Charlie Hurley Park
	J Galvin 1-1, D Murphy 1-0, K Murphy 0-2, D McCarthy 0-1.		M Archer 1-1, D O'Driscoll 1-0, D Murphy 0-3, C Roche 0-3, P Lougheed 0-1.

18 April 1965 First round	Macroom	0-08 - 1-08	Millstreet	Coachford
	J Murphy 0-4, H Casey 0-1, T O'Shea 0-1, N Fitzgerald 0-1, L Brownen 0-1.		W O'Leary 0-4, D O'Mahony 1-0, T Burke 0-2, B Kiely 0-1, J Corcoran 0-1.

25 April 1965 First round	Carrigdhoun	3-10 - 3-08	Duhallow	Castle Grounds
	J Murphy 3-1, C McGrath 0-4, J O'Flynn 0-2, N Sisk 0-1, B Greenway 0-1, M O'Donoghue 0-1.		D O'Sullivan 1-6, B O'Keeffe 1-0, S O'Shea 1-0, M O'Loughlin 0-1, C McCarthy 0-1.

2 May 1965 First round	Clonakilty	1-11 - 0-09	Imokilly	Cork Athletic Grounds
	B Sexton 1-1, F Hayes 0-4, D O'Mahony 0-3, T O'Leary 0-2, C Lane 0-1.		W O'Regan 0-5, T Donoghue 0-1, J Whyte 0-1, M McCarthy 0-1, P Barry 0-1.

2 May 1965 First round	Garda	2-02 - 4-10	Beara	Rossa Park
	J Lowney 2-0, C Brosnan 0-1, J Long 0-1.		JJ Murphy 2-1, E O'Sullivan 2-1, B O'Neill 0-4, D Mullins 0-3, P O'Sullivan 0-1.

16 May 1965 First round	Avondhu	0-08 - 1-08	Nemo Rangers	Clonmult Memorial Park
	W Hanrahan 0-3, B Honohan 0-2, F Fay 0-1, D Murphy 0-1, C Kavanagh 0-1.		J Cogan 1-2, B Barrett 0-3, J Travers 0-1, J Allen 0-1, M Scully 0-1.

23 May 1965 First round	University College Cork	1-12 - 0-03	Seandún	Cork Athletic Grounds
	D Harnedy 0-5, B O'Keeffe 1-0, D Philpott 0-3, D Geaney 0-3, D Ryan 0-1.		T Murphy 0-3.

30 May 1965 First round	St. Nicholas'	1-08 - 0-09	Carbery	Clonakilty Sportsfield
	P O'Brien 1-0, J Daly 0-3, M Coughlan 0-1, P Harte 0-1, D Moore 0-1, D O'Driscoll 0-1, F O'Neill 0-1.		F Collins 0-6, N Kehilly 0-2, J Carroll 0-1.

=== Quarter-finals ===
27 June 1965 Quarter-final	St. Finbarr's	2-07 - 0-10	Millstreet	Castle Grounds
	M Healy 1-1, D Murphy 1-1, D McCarthy 0-3, M Archer 0-1, P O'Mahony 0-1.		T Burke 0-6, W O'Leary 0-2, C Kelleher 0-1, D Cronin 0-1.

1 August 1965 Quarter-final	Beara	1-08 - 0-14	University College Cork	Rossa Park
	P O'Shea 1-1, Con P O'Sullivan 0-2, JJ Murphy 0-2, Joe O'Sullivan 0-2, Paul O'Sullivan 0-1.		D Harnedy 0-5, D Geaney 0-4, F O'Rourke 0-2, D Philpott 0-2, B O'Keeffe 0-1.

22 August 1965 Quarter-final	Clonakilty	1-04 - 3-12	Nemo Rangers	Charlie Hurley Park
	TF Hayes 1-1, K Dillon 0-2, P O'Sullivan 0-1.		B Barrett 2-3, S McGann 1-2, J Cogan 0-3, S Cotter 0-2, D Barrett 0-2.

26 August 1965 Quarter-final	Carrigdhoun	1-02 - 1-12	St. Nicholas'	Douglas Sportsfield
	B Wylie 1-0, J Enright 0-1, C Cooney 0-1.		F O'Neill 1-2, J Daly 0-3, P Harte 0-2, P O'Brien 0-2, D Moore 0-1, D Coughlan 0-1, D Driscoll 0-1.

=== Semi-finals ===
29 August 1965 Semi-final	St. Finbarr's	2-07 - 1-09	Nemo Rangers	Cork Athletic Grounds
	M Healy 1-0, D Murphy 1-0, C Roche 0-3, E Philpott 0-3, M Archer 0-1.		S McGann 0-4, J Travers 1-0, B Barrett 0-2, J Cogan 0-2, J McCarthy 0-1.

10 October 1965 Semi-final	St. Nicholas'	2-09 - 0-11	University College Cork	Cork Athletic Grounds
	W Carroll 1-1, P Harte 1-0, J Daly 0-3, M Coughlan 0-2, D Coughlan 0-2, T Corbett 0-1.		D Harnedy 0-7, E Ryan 0-1, P Moynihan 0-1, B O'Keeffe 0-1, D Philpott 0-1.

=== Final ===
14 November 1965 Final	St. Nicholas'	2-04 - 0-06	St. Finbarr's	Cork Athletic Grounds
	W Carroll 2-1, T Corbett 0-2, P Harte 0-1.		C Roche 0-3, E Philpott 0-2, A Harrington 0-1.	Referee: G Murphy (Innishannon)

== Championship statistics ==
=== Top scorers ===
Overall

Rank	Player	Club	Tally	Total	Matches	Average
1	Dan Harnedy	UCC	0-17	17	3	5.66
2	Brian Barrett	Nemo Rangers	2-08	14	3	4.66
3	Bill Carroll	St. Nicholas'	3-02	11	2	5.50
4	John Murphy	Carrigdhoun	3-01	10	2	5.00
4	Denis Murphy	St. Finbarr's	2-04	10	4	2.50
4	John Cogan	Nemo Rangers	1-07	10	3	3.33
7	J. J. Murphy	Beara	2-03	9	2	4.50
7	Ed O'Sullivan	Beara	2-03	9	2	4.50
7	Dan O'Sullivan	Duhallow	1-06	9	1	9.00
7	Seán McGann	Nemo Rangers	1-06	9	3	3.00
7	Con Roche	St. Finbarr's	0-09	9	4	2.25
7	Jackie Daly	St. Nicholas'	0-09	9	4	2.25

In a single game

Rank	Player	Club	Tally	Total	Opposition
1	John Murphy	Carrigdhoun	3-01	10	Duhallow
2	Brian Barrett	Nemo Rangers	2-03	9	Clonakilty
2	Dan O'Sullivan	Duhallow	1-06	9	Carrigdhoun
4	J. J. Murphy	Beara	2-01	7	Garda
4	Ed O'Sullivan	Beara	2-01	7	Garda
4	Bill Carroll	St. Nicholas'	2-01	7	St. Finbarr's
4	Dan Harnedy	UCC	0-07	7	St. Nicholas'
8	Joe Lowney	Garda	2-00	6	Beara
8	Finbarr Collins	Carbery	0-06	6	St. Nicholas'
8	Tom Burke	Millstreet	0-06	6	St. Finbarr's

=== Miscellaneous ===
- St. Nicholas' win their first title since 1954.
