= 1974 All-Ireland Senior Club Hurling Championship final =

- Event: 1973–74 All-Ireland Senior Club Hurling Championship
Blackrock	Rathnure
Blackrock	Rathnure
2-14	3-11
- Date: 17 March 1974
- Venue: Croke Park, Dublin
- Referee: Paddy Johnson (Kilkenny)
- Attendance: 6,000

Replay
Blackrock	Rathnure
3-8	1-9
- Date: 28 April 1974
- Venue: Fraher Field, Dungarvan
- Referee: Paddy Johnson (Kilkenny)
- Attendance: 3,000

The 1974 All-Ireland Senior Club Hurling Championship final was a hurling match played at Croke Park on 17 March 1974 to determine the winners of the 1973–74 All-Ireland Senior Club Hurling Championship, the fourth season of the All-Ireland Senior Club Hurling Championship, a tournament organised by the Gaelic Athletic Association for the champion clubs of the four provinces of Ireland. The final was contested by Blackrock of Cork and Rathnure of Wexford, with the game ending in a 2–14 to 3–11 draw. The replay took place at Fraher Field on 28 April 1974. Blackrock won that game by 3–8 to 1–9.

The All-Ireland final was the second championship meeting between Blackrock and Rathnure. They had previously met in the All-Ireland final in 1972 when Blackrock were victorious. It remains their last championship meeting. Both sides were bidding to make history with Blackrock hoping to become the first team to win a second All-Ireland title while Rathnure were hoping to win their first.

The first half of the drawn game saw tit-for-tat scoring. Dan Quigley netted the first goal for Rathnure, however, Éamonn O'Donoghue secured Blackrock's first goal seconds later when he kicked the sliotar over the goal-line. Half-time saw the sides retire having scored 1-7 apiece. Donie Collins put Blackrock ahead early in the second half, however, Quigley soon scored his second to restore parity. A ten-minute period of dominance by Blackrock yielded only three points, while Quigley completed his hat-trick with a goal from a 21-yards free to give Rathnure a one-point lead. Pat Moylan secured the equalizer to send the game to a replay.

The replay produced a tension-charged climax as Blackrock turned almost certain defeat into victory. The first half saw a number of unsavory incidents, with John O'Halloran (Blackrock) and Mick Mooney (Rathnure) becoming the first players ever to be sent off in an All-Ireland club final. As the game entered stoppage time, Rathnure held a one-point lead. Blackrock's Donie Collins sent in a ground shot which goalkeeper Michael Foley let slip through his legs. Éamonn O'Donoghue secured the victory with a goal in the second minute of injury time.

Blackrock's victory secured their second All-Ireland title. They became the first club to win the All-Ireland title more than once. It was the third victory in succession for a club representing.

== Match details ==
=== Drawn match ===
17 March 1974

Blackrock	2-14 - 3-11	Rathnure
P Moylan 0-8 (6f), D Collins 1-1, É O'Donoghue 1-1, D Prendergast 0-2, R Cummins 0-2.		D Quigley 3-6 (1-4f), P Flynn 0-2, J Murphy 0-2, John Quigley 0-1.

Croke Park, Dublin
Referee: P Johnston (Kilkenny)

Blackrock	Rathnure

=== Replay ===
28 April 1974

Blackrock	3-8 - 1-9	Rathnure
É O'Donoghue 1-2, D Collins 1-1, R Cummins 1-0, D Prendergast 0-3, P Moylan 0-2.		J Quigley 1-3, D Quigley 0-6.

Fraher Field, Dungarvan
Referee: P Johnston (Kilkenny)

Blackrock	Rathnure
