= 1962 Cork Senior Hurling Championship =

Annual hurling competition season

- Dates: 8 April – 14 October 1962
- Teams: 15
- Champions: Glen Rovers (19th title); Francie O'Regan (captain)
- Runners-up: University College Cork; Jimmy Byrne (captain)

Tournament statistics
- Matches played: 15
- Goals scored: 99 (6.6 per match)
- Points scored: 245 (16.33 per match)
- Top scorer(s): Christy Ring (10-12)

The 1962 Cork Senior Hurling Championship was the 74th staging of the Cork Senior Hurling Championship since its establishment by the Cork County Board in 1887. The draw for the opening round fixtures took place at the Cork Convention on 28 January 1962. The championship began on 8 April 1962 and ended on 14 October 1962.

Blackrock were the defending champions, however, they were defeated by Imokilly at the quarter-final stage.

On 14 October 1962, Glen Rovers won the championship following a 3–8 to 2–10 defeat of University College Cork in a replay of the final. This was their 19th championship title overall and their first in two championship seasons.

Christy Ring from the Glen Rovers club was the championship's top scorer with 10–12.

== Team changes ==
=== From Championship ===
Declined to field a team

- Duhallow

== Results ==
First round

8 April 1962 First round	Passage	3-08 - 1-04	St. Vincent's	Carrigaline
	J Barry 1-3, C Healy 1-2, J Fitzgerald 1-0, J O'Reilly 0-2, D O'Hanlon 0-1.		T Twomey 1-1, B Heffernan 0-1, P O'Rourke 0-1, C O'Shea 0-1.	Referee: P Cronin (St. Finbarr's)

22 April 1962 First round	Sarsfields	1-08 - 0-15	St. Finbarr's	Cork Athletic Grounds, Cork
	T O'Meara 1-1, J White 0-3, R Lotty 0-1, T O'Sullivan 0-1, M Kenny 0-1, P Barry 0-1.		P Prendergast 0-4, D Murphy 0-3, T Cronin 0-2, M Finn 0-2, M Leahy 0-2, T Maher 0-1, M Ryan 0-1.	Referee: M Walsh (Mayfield)

22 April 1962 First round	Mallow	1-02 - 8-11	Glen Rovers	Buttevant
	B Gyves 1-0, L Sheehan 0-1, D Buckley 0-1.		C Ring 4-2, D O'Driscoll 2-2, M Quane 2-0, P Harte 0-4, D Moore 0-3.	Referee: M O'Mahony (Buttevant)

29 April 1962 First round	Na Piarsaigh	3-09 - 4-02	Carbery	Riverstick
	P Goggin 1-1, J Sutton 1-0, T O'Leary 1-0, C Mulcahy 0-3, D Greaney 0-2, P Allen 0-2, D Sheehan 0-1.		D O'Mahony 2-0, B Kennedy 1-1, M Hussey 0-1, N O'Donovan 0-1.	Referee: J O'Mahony (Passage)

13 May 1962 First round	Carrigdhoun	0-11 - 2-10	Blackrock	Cork Athletic Grounds, Cork
	S Nyhan 0-4, R Sisk 0-3, M Donoghue 0-2, J Nyhan 0-1, N Mahony 0-1.		W Galligan 0-7, J O'Leary 1-1, J Redmond 1-0, T Connolly 0-1, J Bennett 0-1.	Referee: C Conway (Blarney)

13 May 1962 First round	Avondhu	8-07 - 4-03	Seandún	Riverstown
				Referee: J Leahy (Sarsfields)

13 May 1962 First round	University College Cork	4-07 - 1-08	Muskerry	Ballincollig
	J O'Halloran 1-3, M Mortell 1-2, G Allen 1-1, D Murphy 1-0, J Byrne 0-1.		G O'Regan 0-4, B Fitton 1-0, M Murphy 0-2, T Brady 0-1, D O'Brien 0-1.	Referee: P Cronin (St. Finbarr's

Quarter-finals

20 May 1962 Quarter-final	St. Finbarr's	2-17 - 4-10	Passage	Cork Athletic Grounds, Cork
	M Finn 1-3, D Prendergast 0-5, T Cronin 1-1, G McCarthy 0-3, M Ryan 0-3, W Walsh 0-1, M Leahy 0-1.		J Barry 1-6, C Healy 1-1, Coughlan 1-1, J O'Mahony 1-0, J O'Reilly 0-2.	Referee: M O'Connell (St. Vincent's)

8 June 1962 Quarter-final	Glen Rovers	3-12 - 4-05	Na Piarsaigh	The Mardyke, Cork
	P Harte 1-3, C Ring 0-4, J Young 1-0, M Quane 1-0, S Kennefick 0-1, J O'Sullivan 0-1, T Corbett 0-1, D Moore 0-1, J Daly 0-1.		R Touhy 2-2, T O'Leary 1-1, P Allen 1-0, M O'Meara 0-1, C Greaney 0-1.	Referee: J Lotty (Sarsfields)

18 June 1962 Quarter-final	Imokilly	7-09 - 6-04	Blackrock	Clonmult Memorial Park, Midleton
	L Dowling 3-2, J O'Connell 2-1, M O'Brien 2-0, D Cusack 0-2, S Daly 0-2, J O'Connor 0-1, P Fitzgerald 0-1.		W Galligan 2-0, J Bennett 1-2, M Cashman 1-1, F O'Mahony 1-0, J Brohan 1-0, N O'Connell 0-1.	Referee: C Conway (Blarney)

22 July 1962 Quarter-final	University College Cork	6-09 - 5-06	Avondhu	Bishop Casey Memorial Park, Mallow
	G Allen 3-1, M Mortell 1-6, J Alyun 2-0, D Alyun 0-1, O Harrington 0-1.		R Browne 2-2, M O'Connor 2-0, R Ennis 1-0, W Hegarty 0-2, J Keating 0-1, P Behan 0-1.	Referee: J Mahony (Passage)

Semi-finals

26 August 1962 Semi-final	University College Cork	4-13 - 1-02	St. Finbarr's	Cork Athletic Grounds, Cork
	M Mortell 0-9, J Flynn 1-0, D Kelleher 1-0, M Byrne 1-0, G Allen 1-0, D Flynn 0-2, D Murphy 0-1, N Phelan 0-1.		T Cronin 1-0, G McCarthy 0-1, M Leahy 0-1.	Referee: J Lotty (Sarsfields)

2 September 1962 Semi-final	Glen Rovers	4-08 - 3-10	Imokilly	Cork Athletic Grounds, Cork
	C Ring 4-2, D Moore 0-2, T Corbett 0-1, P Harte 0-1, M Quane 0-1, J Young 0-1.		S Daly 2-3, J O'Connell 1-0, P Fitzgerald 0-3, P Duggan 0-2, J O'Connor 0-1, DJ Daly 0-1.	Referee: S Mahony (Passage)

Finals

30 September 1962 Final	Glen Rovers	3-07 - 2-10	University College Cork	Athletic Grounds, Cork
	C Ring 1-3, W Carroll 1-1, M Quane 1-0, P Harte 0-2, T Corbett 0-1.		J O'Halloran 1-1, J Blake 1-0, M Mortell 0-3, M Óg Murphy 0-2, G Allen 0-1, O Harrington 0-1, J Byrne 0-1, D Murphy 0-1.	Attendance: 17,000; Referee: P Cronin (St. Finbarr's)

14 October 1962 Final replay	Glen Rovers	3-08 - 2-10	University College Cork	Athletic Grounds, Cork
	W Carroll 1-2, C Ring 1-1, J Daly 1-0, P Harte 0-2, M Quane 0-1, D Moore 0-1, J Salmon 0-1.		M Mortell 1-3, J Blake 1-0, J Byrne 0-3, G Allen 0-2, D Murphy 0-1, O Harrington 0-1.	Attendance: 25,028; Referee: P Cronin (St. Finbarr's)

== Championship statistics ==
=== Top scorers ===
Top scorers overall

Rank	Player	Club	Tally	Total	Matches	Average
1	Christy Ring	Glen Rovers	10-12	42	5	8.40
2	Mick Mortell	UCC	3-23	32	5	6.40
3	George Allen	UCC	5-05	20	5	4.00

Top scorers in a single game

Rank	Player	Club	Tally	Total	Opposition
1	Christy Ring	Glen Rovers	4-02	14	Mallow
1	Christy Ring	Glen Rovers	4-02	14	Imokilly
3	Liam Dowling	Imokilly	3-02	11	Blackrock
4	George Allen	UCC	3-01	10	Avondhu
5	Séamus Daly	Imokilly	2-03	9	Glen Rovers
5	Mick Mortell	UCC	1-06	9	Avondhu
5	John Barry	Passage	1-06	9	St. Finbarr's
5	Mick Mortell	UCC	0-09	9	St. Finbarr's
9	Denis O'Driscoll	Glen Rovers	2-02	8	Mallow
9	Roger Tuohy	Na Piarsaigh	2-02	8	Glen Rovers
9	Richie Browne	Avondhu	2-02	8	UCC
