= 1959 Cork Senior Hurling Championship =

Annual hurling competition season

- Dates: 5 April – 25 October 1959
- Teams: 14
- Champions: Glen Rovers (17th title); John Lyons (captain)
- Runners-up: Blackrock; Jimmy Brohan (captain)

Tournament statistics
- Matches played: 13
- Goals scored: 95 (7.31 per match)
- Points scored: 171 (13.15 per match)
- Top scorer(s): Christy Ring (6-12)

The 1959 Cork Senior Hurling Championship was the 71st staging of the Cork Senior Hurling Championship since its establishment by the Cork County Board in 1887. The draw for the opening round fixtures took place at the Cork Convention on 25 January 1959. The championship began on 5 April 1959 and ended on 25 October 1959.

Glen Rovers entered the championship as the defending champions.

The final was played on 25 October 1959 at the Athletic Grounds in Cork, between Glen Rovers and Blackrock, in what was their first meeting in the final in two years. Glen Rovers won the match by 3–11 to 3–05 to claim their 17th championship title overall and a second title in succession.

Christy Ring from the Glen Rovers club was the championship's top scorer with 6–12.

== Results ==
=== First round ===
5 April 1959 First round	Carbery	2-03 - 3-09	Carrigtwohill	Cork Athletic Grounds
	C Corcoran 1-1, M Farr 1-0, E Young 0-1, M Maguire 0-1.		P Roche 2-1, Driscoll 1-1, J Flynn 0-2, Paddy Hartnett 0-1, D Neville 0-1, Paul Hartnett 0-1, W Moore 0-1.	Referee: M Walsh (Mayfield)

5 April 1959 First round	Imokilly	6-05 - 5-07	Avondhu	Páirc Mac Gearailt
	P Fitzgerald 2-3, J Murphy 2-0, M O'Brien 1-1, S Daly 1-0, G Gorman 0-1.		M O'Toole 3-1, P Browne 2-3, W Galligan 0-2, P Behan 0-1.

12 April 1959 First round	Na Piarsaigh	3-04 - 11-05	Glen Rovers	Cork Athletic Grounds
	P Allen 2-2, D Sheehan 1-0, J Gould 0-2.		C Ring 4-3, J Young 2-1, B Carroll 2-1, J Daly 1-0, J Twomey 1-0, N Lynam 1-0.	Referee: M Walsh (Mayfield)

19 April 1959 First round	St. Finbarr's	1-07 - 5-10	University College Cork	The Mardyke
	D Hurley 1-1, W Walsh 0-3, M Finn 0-2, M Ryan 0-1.		Henchy 2-5, M Mortell 1-1, Browne 1-0, Melee goal 1-0, S Long 0-1, Murphy 0-1, N Gallagher 0-1,

10 May 1959 First round	Sarsfields	5-06 - 3-08	Carrigdhoun	Cork Athletic Grounds
	P Barry 3-0, T Murphy 1-3, P O'Leary 1-1, T O'Sullivan 0-1, M Kenny 0-1.		S Kelly 1-5, D Lordan 1-0, T Brady 1-0, S Nyhan 0-2, T Kelly 0-1.

3 June 1959 First round	Blackrock	5-11 - 0-03	Duhallow	The Mardyke
	P O'Sullivan 1-5, T Delea 1-2, M Nurphy 1-2, N O'Connell 1-1, A Connolly 1-0, J Darmody 0-1.		D Donoghue 0-2, S Stokes 0-1.	Referee: T Cronin (St. Finbarr's)

=== Quarter-finals ===
12 April 1959 Quarter-final	Seandún	6-06 - 2-01	Muskerry	Coachford
	J O'Reilly 2-0, V Barrett 1-2, B O'Shea 1-1, T Carroll 1-0, J Coughlan 1-0, P O'Rourke 0-2, S Fitzpatrick 0-1.		D Morrissey 1-1, P O'Brien 1-0.	Referee: P O'Leary (Sarsfields)

5 July 1959 Quarter-final	University College Cork	4-10 - 5-04	Carrigtwohill	Clonmult Memorial Park
	P Henchy 2-3, S Long 2-1, T Riordan 0-2, JJ Browne 0-1, O Harrington 0-1, P O'Shea 0-1, T Gallagher 0-1.		J O'Connor 2-2, WJ Daly 1-0, P Roche 1-0, L Driscoll 1-0, J Flynn 0-2.	Referee: C Conway (Blarney)

30 August 1959 Quarter-final	Glen Rovers	4-08 - 1-05	Imokilly	Riverstown Sportsfield
	M Lynch 1-4, M Quane 2-0.			Referee: P Cronin (St. Finbarr's)

13 September 1959 Quarter-final	Blackrock	3-07 - 2-03	Sarsfields	Cork Athletic Grounds
	J Fahy 1-3, F O'Mahony 1-2, F O'Regan 1-1, N O'Connell 0-1.		P Barry 2-1, D Hurley 0-1, T O'Sullivan 0-1.	Referee: P Cronin (St. Finbarr's)

=== Semi-finals ===
27 September 1959 Semi-final	Glen Rovers	4-06 - 2-10	University College Cork	Cork Athletic Grounds
	M Quane 2-1, C Ring 1-3, B Carroll 1-1, N Lynam 0-1.		JJ Browne 1-1, P Henchy 0-4, N Gallagher 1-0, T Riordan 0-2, D Murphy 0-2, S Long 0-1.	Referee: P Cronin (St. Finbarr's)

27 September 1959 Semi-final	Blackrock	5-11 - 2-06	Seandún	Cork Athletic Grounds
	T Delea 2-0, J Bennett 1-2, N O'Connell 1-1, F O'Mahony 1-1, T Furlong 0-3, F O'Regan 0-2, J Fahy 0-1, M Cashman 0-1.		B O'Shea 1-1, T Carroll 1-0, V Barrett 0-3, E O'Connell 0-1, M O'Donoghue 0-1.	Referee: M Walsh (Mayfield)

=== Final ===
25 October 1959 Final	Glen Rovers	3-11 - 3-05	Blackrock	Cork Athletic Grounds
	C Ring 1-6; P Healy 2-2; J Twomey 0-2; E Goulding 0-1.		N O'Connell 1-1; F O'Mahoney 1-0; T Delea 1-0; J Bennett 0-2; J Fahy 0-1; F O'Regan 0-1.	Attendance: 23,882

== Championship statistics ==
=== Top scorers ===
Top score overall

Rank	Player	Club	Tally	Total	Matches	Average
1	Christy Ring	Glen Rovers	6-12	30	3	10.00
2	Tommy Delea	Blackrock	4-02	14	4	3.50
3	Mick Quane	Glen Rovers	4-01	13	3	4.33
3	Noel O'Connell	Glen Rovers	3-04	13	4	3.25
3	Pat Henchy	UCC	2-07	13	2	6.50
