= Con McGrath =

Irish Gaelic footballer

Personal information
- Native name: Conchur Mac Craith (Irish)
- Born: 1924 Clifden, County Galway, Ireland
- Died: 9 August 2008 (aged 84) Bishopstown, Cork, Ireland
- Occupation: Garda Síochána
- Height: 6 ft 0 in (183 cm)

Sport
- Sport: Gaelic football
- Position: Centre-back
Clubs
- Years: Club
- Multyfarnham; Erin's Hopes; St Finbarr's; Garda; West Kerry; Bantry Blues
Club titles
- Cork titles: 1
College
- Years: College
- University College Galway
College titles
- Sigerson titles: 1
Inter-county
- Years: County
- 1943-1946 1947-1952: Galway; Cork
Inter-county titles
- Munster titles: 2
- All-Irelands: 0
- NFL: 1

Michael Cornelius McGrath (1924 – 9 August 2008) was an Irish Gaelic footballer who played for numerous club sides, but most notably St Finbarr's and Garda, and at senior level with the Galway and Cork county teams.

== Career ==
McGrath first made an impression on the Gaelic football field when at college in Multyfarnham he lined out for the local club's senior and junior teams. From there he went to University College Galway where he won a Sigerson Cup title as well as winning a West Galway Championship with Erin's Hopes. McGrath first played for the Galway senior football team in a challenge match against Roscommon in 1943. After moving to Cork he joined the St Finbarr's club before filling the full-back position on the Cork junior team in 1947. Promotion to the senior team quickly followed and he won his first Munster Championship in 1949. As captain of the Garda club McGrath won a County Championship medal in 1950 and was appointed captain of the Cork senior team the following year. He claimed a second Munster Championship title as well as a National League title in his last year with the team in 1952. McGrath was also a regular with the Munster team and won back-to-back Railway Cup medals in 1948 and 1949. His son, Paul McGrath, won back-to-back All-Ireland titles with Cork in 1989–90.

== Personal life and death ==
Born in Clifden, County Galway, McGrath was educated at the Franciscan College in Multyfarnham and University College Galway before joining the Garda Síochána. After passing out he was first stationed in Cork and Bantry. He was promoted to the rank of sergeant in Castlegregory and it was from Tralee that he was transferred as inspector to Limerick in 1968. McGrath was later transferred to Cobh and settled in Bishopstown with his wife and six children.

Con McGrath died on 9 August 2008.

== Honours ==
University College Galway

- Sigerson Cup: 1949

Garda

- Cork Senior Football Championship: 1950 (c)

Cork

- Munster Senior Football Championship: 1949, 1952
- National Football League: 1951-52

Sporting positions
Preceded by John Cronin	Cork Senior Football Captain; 1951	Succeeded by Éamonn Young
