= Dan Harnedy =

Irish Gaelic footballer and hurler (1942–2024)

Personal information
- Native name: Dónal Ó hAirtnéada (Irish)
- Born: 1942 Castlemagner, County Cork, Ireland
- Died: 23 April 2024 (aged 82) Malahide; County Dublin, Ireland
- Occupation: Engineer

Sport
- Sport: Gaelic footballer
- Position: Left corner-forward
Clubs
- Years: Club
- Castlemagner → University College Cork; Éire Óg; Carlow Town Hurling Club
Club titles
	Football	Hurling
Cork titles	2	1
College
- Years: College
- 1961-1966: University College Cork
College titles
- Sigerson titles: 1
Inter-county
Years	County	Apps (scores)
1964-1966	Cork	1 (0-04)
Inter-county titles
- Munster titles: 0
- All-Irelands: 0
- NFL: 0

Daniel Harnedy (1942– 23 April 2024) was an Irish hurler and Gaelic footballer. At club level he played with Castlemagner and University College Cork in Cork, Éire Óg and Carlow Town Hurling Club and also at inter-county level with the Cork senior football team.

== Playing career ==
Harnedy had his first success as a student at De La Salle College in Waterford. He was part of the college's Corn Uí Mhuirí-winning team in 1961. Harnedy also had club success at this time, winning three Duhallow divisional titles as a dual player in 1960 and 1961.

Harnedy later played both hurling and Gaelic football with University College Cork (UCC) during his engineering studies. He was part of the UCC senior teams in both codes that won the SHC and SFC titles in 1963. Harnedy added a second successive SFC title to his collection in 1964. His UCC career ended after winning the Sigerson Cup title in 1966.

Club and college successes resulted in Harnedy being selected for the Cork under-21 football team. He won a Munster U21FC medal in 1963 after a 2–03 to 1–04 defeat of Kerry in the final. Harnedy first played for the senior team in a National League game in 1964. He made his sole Munster SFC appearance in a 2–05 to 0–06 defeat by Limerick in 1965.

A move to Carlow saw Harnedy join the Éire Óg club and he won three successive Carlow SFC titles from 1967 to 1969. He also lined out with Carlow Town Hurling Club.

== Post-playing career ==
In retirement from playing, Harnedy became involved in team management and administration. He was a selector with the Carlow Town hurling team for their Carlow SHC victories in 1977, 1979 and 1980. He was also a selector for Carlow at senior and under-21 levels.

After serving as UCC secretary during his playing days, Harnedy was elected chairman of the Carlow County Board in 1981. He was secretary of the Carlow Town Hurling Club for eight years before later serving as the club's chairman for 15 years.

== Personal life and death ==
His father, Dick Harnedy, won a Munster SFC medal with Cork in 1943 and is regarded as one of Cork's greatest-ever players. His grandnephew, Séamus Harnedy, has won three Munster SHC medals with the Cork senior hurling team.

Harnedy died on 23 April 2024, at the age of 82.

== Honours ==
=== Player ===
De La Salle College

- Corn Uí Mhuirí: 1961

University College Cork

- Sigerson Cup: 1966
- Cork Senior Hurling Championship: 1963
- Cork Senior Football Championship: 1963, 1964

Castlemagner

- Duhallow Junior Hurling Championship: 1960
- Duhallow Junior Football Championship: 1960, 1961

Éire Óg

- Carlow Senior Football Championship: 1967, 1968, 1969

Cork

- Munster Under-21 Football Championship: 1963

=== Selector ===
Carlow Town Hurling Club

- Carlow Senior Hurling Championship: 1977, 1979, 1980

Sporting positions
Preceded by Luke Hickey	Chairman of the Carlow County Board; 1981-1982	Succeeded by Moling Lennon
