= Pat Dowling =

Irish hurler

Personal information
- Native name: Pádraig Ó Dúalaing (Irish)
- Born: 1936 (age 89–90) Castlemartyr, County Cork, Ireland
- Height: 5 ft 9 in (175 cm)

Sport
- Sport: Hurling
- Position: Left wing-back
Clubs
- Years: Club
- Castlemartyr; Sarsfields
Club titles
- Cork titles: 1
Inter-county
Years	County	Apps (scores)
1956–1957	Cork	6 (0–0)
Inter-county titles
- Munster titles: 1
- All-Irelands: 0
- NHL: 0

Pat Dowling (born 1936 in Castlemartyr, County Cork) is a former Irish sportsman. He played hurling with his local club Castlemartyr and was a member of the Cork senior team in the 1950s. Dowling won a Munster SHC title, as well as an All-Ireland SHC runner-up medal with Cork in 1956.
