= 1956 Cork Junior Football Championship =

Irish hurling competition

- Champions: St Michael's (1st title)
- Runners-up: Dromtarriffe

The 1956 Cork Junior Football Championship was the 58th staging of the Cork Junior Football Championship since its establishment by the Cork County Board in 1895.

The final was played on 25 November 1956 at the Athletic Grounds in Cork, between St Michael's and Dromtarriffe, in what was their first ever meeting in the final. St Michael's won the match by 5–06 to 0–05 to claim their first ever championship title.

== Results ==
=== Final ===
25 November 1956 Final	St Michael's	5–06 – 0–05	Dromtarriffe	Cork Athletic Grounds
