= 1963 Cork Senior Football Championship =

Gaelic football competition

- Dates: 7 April - 13 October 1963
- Teams: 23
- Champions: University College Cork (5th title); Liam Scully (captain)
- Runners-up: St. Nicholas'; John Joe Kelly (captain)

Tournament statistics
- Matches played: 24
- Goals scored: 65 (2.71 per match)
- Points scored: 330 (13.75 per match)
- Top scorer(s): Bernard Coughlan (5-09)

The 1963 Cork Senior Football Championship was the 75th staging of the Cork Senior Football Championship since its establishment by the Cork County Board in 1887. The draw for the opening round fixtures took place on 27 January 1963. The championship ran from 7 April to 13 October 1963.

Macroom entered the championship as the defending champions, however, they were beaten by University College Cork in the semi-finals.

The final was played on 13 October 1963 at the Athletic Grounds in Cork between University College Cork and St. Nicholas' in what was their first ever meeting in the final. University College Cork won the match by 1-06 to 1-05 to claim their fifth championship title overall and a first title in three years.

Garda's Bernard Coughlan was the championship's top scorer with 5-09.

== Team changes ==
=== To Championship ===
Promoted from the Cork Junior Football Championship

- Douglas

== Results ==
=== First round ===
7 April 1963 First round	St. Finbarr's	0-08 - 0-02	Carrigdhoun	Manning Park
	G Harrington 0-5, T Cronin 0-2, M Archer 0-1.		C Cooney 0-1, C McGrath 0-1.

7 April 1963 First round	St. Nicholas'	3-01 - 1-05	Avondhu	Clonmult Memorial Grounds
	M Coughlan 2-0, P Harte 1-0, J O'Sullivan 0-1.		B Hanrahan 0-3, J Flynn 0-1, J Lawton 0-1.

7 April 1963 First round	Delaneys	0-03 - 1-09	Duhallow	Castle Grounds
	P Barry 0-3.		W O'Leary 0-7, J O'Keeffe 1-0, T Burke 0-1, J Corcoran 0-1.

14 April 1963 First round	Nemo Rangers	3-04 - 2-05	Douglas	Cork Athletic Grounds
	D Kelly 1-0, J McCarthy 1-0, F Cogan 1-0, B Barrett 0-2, J McCarthy 0-1, F O'Leary 0-1.		E Carroll 1-1, B Larkin 1-1, P Kelleher 0-3.	Referee: D Owens (St. Nicholas')

21 April 1963 First round	Beara	2-06 - 2-06	Garda	Sam Maguire Park
	S O'Sullivan 1-1, J O'Sullivan 0-4, JL O'Sullivan 1-0, P O'Sullivan 0-1.		B Coughlan 1-2, L Nolan 1-0, M Dowd 0-3, R O'Callaghan 0-1.

28 April 1963 First round	Imokilly	3-16 - 2-09	Lees	Riverstown Sportsfield
	R Ryan 2-1, M Hodnett 0-6, B O'Regan 0-5, N Gallagher 1-1, Twomey 0-1, O'Shea 0-1, Collins 0-1.		T Collins 0-5, Barrett 1-1, P Murphy 0-2, D Murphy 0-1.

5 May 1963 First round replay	Beara	0-09 - 2-05	Garda	Rossa Park
	J O'Sullivan 0-6, J McAuliffe 0-1, R O'Dwyer 0-1, S O'Sullivan 0-1.,		D Coughlan 2-2, J McCarthy 0-2, W Nolan 0-1.

12 May 1963 First round	St. Vincent's	0-05 - 2-02	Clonakilty	Charlie Hurley Park
	P O'Neill 0-2, P Barry 0-1, C Cronin 0-1, DJ O'Regan 0-1.		F Hayes 1-0, C Lane 1-0, T Hayes 0-1, D O'Mahony 0-1.

- Muskerry, St. Michael's, Seandún, Macroom, Urhan, Fermoy, University College Cork, Carbery and Mitchelstown received byes in this round.

=== Second round ===
7 April 1963 Second round	St. Michael's	1-10 - 1-05	Seandún	Cork Athletic Grounds
	J Brohan 1-4, P O'Sullivan 0-4, T Delaney 0-1, J Hayes 0-1.		J Healy 1-0, J Furlong 0-3, D Daly 0-1, P Goggin 0-1.

5 May 1963 Second round	University College Cork	3-19 - 1-02	Fermoy	Bishop Casey Memorial Park
	N Flynn 1-3, D Harnedy 1-2, O Whitson 1-1, D Geaney 0-4, D Philpott 0-3, M Kelly 0-2, L Scully 0-2, F O'Reilly 0-1, J McCarthy 0-1.		R Ennis 1-1, K Dennigan 0-1.

5 May 1963 Second round	Macroom	1-01 - 1-06 (abandoned)	Urhan	Rossa Park

2 June 1963 Second round refixture	Macroom	1-11 - 1-08	Urhan	Rossa Park
	N Fitzgerald 0-4, L Brownen 1-0, J O'Brien 0-2, N McCarthy 0-2, H Casey 0-2, E Ryan 0-1.		C O'Sullivan 0-4, J Murphy 1-0, M Lynch 0-1, T O'Sullivan 0-1, S O'Sullivan 0-1, J Downing 0-1.

2 June 1963 Second round	Duhallow	0-07 - 2-03	St. Finbarr's	Coachford Sportsfield
	W O'Leary 0-6, P Moriarty 0-1.		D Hurley 2-0, P Lougheed 0-1, T Cronin 0-1, T Mulcahy 0-1.

16 June 1963 Second round	Carbery	1-08 - 1-08	Mitchelstown	Castle Grounds
	J Carroll 1-1, D Lyons 0-3, R O'Neill 0-2, D O'Donovan 0-2.		M Barrett 1-3, B Hourihan 0-1, N Curley 0-1, T Monaghan 0-1, P Clancy 0-1, M O'Brien 0-1.

23 June 1963 Second round	Clonakilty	1-10 - 1-04	Nemo Rangers	Charlie Hurley Park
	D O'Mahony 1-0, B Sexton 0-3, P O'Sullivan 0-3, TF Hayes 0-1, M Crowley 0-1, F Hayes 0-1, B Lyons 0-1		D McGann 1-0, B Barrett 0-1, F Cogan 0-1, J McCarthy 0-1, S Kelly 0-1.

23 June 1963 Second round replay	Carbery	1-04 - 3-10	Mitchelstown	Cork Athletic Grounds
	J Carroll 1-2, F Collins 0-1, M Nyhan 0-1.		T Monaghan 3-0, M Barrett 0-6, N Curley 0-1, N Kelly 0-1, M Burke 0-1, M O'Brien 0-1.

7 July 1963 Second round	Garda	2-06 - 0-11	Muskerry	Castle Grounds
	M O'Dowd 1-1, J McCarthy 1-0, C Clifford 0-2, B Coughlan 0-1, F Corrigan 0-1, S O'Connell 0-1.		P Galvin 0-9, B Fitton 0-1, J Galvin 0-1.

7 July 1963 Second round	St. Nicholas'	2-09 - 2-04	Imokilly	Riverstown Sportsfield
	M Keohane 2-1, J Daly 0-2, D O'Donovan 0-2, P Harte 0-1, D Moore 0-1, M Coughlan 0-1, B Carroll 0-1.		E Ryan 1-1, M Hodnett 1-0, B O'Regan 0-3.

=== Quarter-finals ===
28 July 1963 Quarter-final	Macroom	2-12 - 2-05	St. Michael's	Clonakilty Grounds
	E Ryan 1-2, L Brownen 1-1, J O'Brien 0-4, P O'Sullivan 0-2, J Murphy 0-2, H Casey 0-1.		J Brohan 1-3, N Burke 1-0, J Hayes 0-2.

4 August 1963 Quarter-final	University College Cork	1-09 - 0-06	Mitchelstown	Páirc Mac Gearailt
	D Philpott 0-5, D Harnedy 0-4, N Phelan 1-0.		M Barrett 0-4, N Coughlan 0-1, N Curley 0-1.

4 August 1963 Quarter-final	Garda	2-09 - 1-05	Clonakilty	Castle Grounds
	B Coughlan 1-2, M Clifford 0-5, C Clifford 1-1, J McCarthy 0-1.		F Hayes 1-2, D Lyons 0-1, T O'Leary 0-1, C Cullinane 0-1.

1 September 1963 Quarter-final	St. Nicholas'	1-08 - 1-02	St. Finbarr's	Cork Athletic Grounds
	B Carroll 1-1, D Moore 0-3, J Daly 0-2, P Harte 0-1, M Coughlan 0-1.		S McCarthy 1-0, G Harrington 0-2.

=== Semi-finals ===
15 September 1963 Semi-final	University College Cork	1-08 - 0-09	Macroom	Coachford Sportsfield
	N Phelan 1-0, D Philpott 0-3, D Harnedy 0-2, F O'Rourke 0-2, L Scully 0-1.		J Murphy 0-5, N Fitzgerald 0-2, J O'Brien 0-1, P O'Sullivan 0-1.	Referee: F Halbert (Glenville)

15 September 1963 Semi-final	St. Nicholas'	3-06 - 2-06	Garda	Cork Athletic Grounds
	B Carroll 2-0, D Moore 1-2, J Daly 0-2, JJ Kelly 0-1, M Coughlan 0-1.		B Coughlan 1-2, S McGrath 1-0, M Dowd 0-2, C Clifford 0-2.	Referee: M O'Connell (St. Vincent's)

=== Final ===
13 October 1963 Final	University College Cork	1-06 - 1-05	St. Nicholas'	Cork Athletic Grounds
	L Scully 0-4, D Harnedy 1-0, F O'Rourke 0-1, M Fleming 0-1.		W Carroll 1-2, J Daly 0-2, JJ Kelly 0-1.	Referee: F Halbert (Glenville)

== Championship statistics ==
=== Top scorers ===
Overall

Rank	Player	Club	Tally	Total	Matches	Average
1	Bernard Coughlan	Garda	5-09	24	5	4.80
2	Bill Carroll	St. Nicholas'	4-04	16	5	3.20
2	Mick Barrett	Mitchelstown	1-13	16	3	5.33
4	Dan Harnedy	UCC	2-08	14	4	3.50
5	Jimmy Brohan	St. Michael's	2-07	13	2	6.50
5	Billy O'Leary	Duhallow	0-13	13	2	6.50
7	Éamonn Ryan	Imokilly	3-02	11	2	5.50
7	Denis Philpott	UCC	0-11	11	4	2.75
9	Tom Monaghan	Mitchelstown	3-01	10	3	3.33
9	Joe O'Sullivan	Beara	0-10	10	2	5.00

In a single game

Rank	Player	Club	Tally	Total	Opposition
1	Tom Monaghan	Mitchelstown	3-00	9	Carbery
1	Pat Galvin	Muskerry	0-09	9	Garda
3	Bernard Coughlan	Garda	2-02	8	Beara
4	Éamonn Ryan	Imokilly	2-01	7	Lees
4	Mick Quane	St. Nicholas'	2-01	7	Imokilly
4	Jimmy Brohan	St. Michael's	1-04	7	Seandún
4	Billy O'Leary	Duhallow	0-07	7	Delaneys
8	Michael Coughlan	St. Nicholas'	2-00	6	Avondhu
8	D. Hurley	St. Finbarr's	2-00	6	Duhallow
8	Bill Carroll	St. Nicholas'	2-00	6	Garda
8	Jimmy Brohan	St. Michael's	1-03	6	Macroom
8	Ned Flynn	UCC	1-03	6	Fermoy
8	Mick Barrett	Mitchelstown	1-03	6	Carbery
8	Moss Hodnett	Imokilly	0-06	6	Lees
8	Joe O'Sullivan	Beara	0-06	6	Garda
8	Billy O'Leary	Duhallow	0-06	6	St. Finbarr's
8	Mick Barrett	Mitchelstown	0-06	6	Carbery

=== Miscellaneous ===
- UCC GAA become the first club since Glen Rovers/St. Nicholas' in 1954 to complete the double.
- On 5 May 1963, the Urhan-Macroom match was abandoned just before half time when the father of Macroom captain Niall FitzGerald collapsed and died while watching the match.
- St. Nicholas' qualify for the final for the first time since 1954.
