= Michael Mortell =

Irish doctor and academic, President of University Cork 2007-2017

12th President of University College Cork
- In office 1989–1999
- Preceded by: Tadhg Ó Ciardha
- Succeeded by: Gerard Wrixon

Personal details
- Born: Michael Philip Mortell Cork, Ireland
- Education: C.B.S. Charleville
- Alma mater: University College Cork; California Institute of Technology
- Profession: Mathematician and academic
Michael Mortell
Sport
- Sport: Hurling
- Position: Left wing-forward
Clubs
Years	Club	Apps (scores)
1958-1963 1959-1963 1973-1976	Rath Lúirc → UCC; Carrigaline	20 (8-53)
Club titles
- Cork titles: 1
College
- Years: College
- 1958-1963: University College Cork
College titles
- Fitzgibbon titles: 3
Inter-county
Years	County	Apps (scores)
1962-1963	Cork	2 (0-08)
Inter-county titles
- Munster titles: 0
- All-Irelands: 0
- NHL: 0

Michael Philip Mortell is an Irish mathematician and academic. He was the president of University College Cork from 1989 to 1999. Mortell also had a sporting career and played hurling with a number of club sides and the Cork senior hurling team.

== Early life and education ==
Born in Cork, Mortell was educated at Charleville CBS Secondary School. He studied for his primary degree in Mathematics and Mathematical Physics at University College Cork (UCC) where he was awarded a BSc in 1961 and an MSc in 1963. Mortell subsequently studied at the California Institute of Technology and was awarded a PhD for a thesis on "Waves on Shells" in 1968.

== Academic career ==
Mortell was named associate professor at the Center for the Application of Mathematics at Lehigh University, Pennsylvania in 1967. From 1973 he was statutory lecturer in the department of Mathematical Physics at UCC and later Professor of Applied Mathematics. He was appointed registrar in 1979 and was named president in 1989. Mortell held a personal chair in Applied Mathematics from 1999 until he retired in 2006.

== Sporting career ==
Mortell first played hurling with the CBS Charleville team in the Harty Cup. He joined the Rath Lúirc intermediate team in the 1958 season. Mortell lined out with UCC GAA from 1959 until 1963, during which time he won three Fitzgibbon Cup titles. He was also a member of the team that won the college's inaugural Cork Senior Hurling Championship title in the 1963 Cork Senior Hurling Championship. Mortell first appeared on the inter-county scene as a member of the Cork minor hurling team during the 1959 Munster MHC. He later played with the Cork senior team for one season. Mortell ended his club career with Carrigaline.

== Sporting honours ==
University College Cork

- Cork Senior Hurling Championship: 1963
- Fitzgibbon Cup: 1959, 1962, 1963

Carrigaline

- South East Junior A Hurling Championship: 1974

Academic offices
Preceded by Tadhg Ó Ciardha	President of University College Cork; 1989–1999	Succeeded by Gerard Wrixon
