= 1950 Cork Senior Football Championship =

Gaelic football competition

- Dates: 16 April – 18 October 1950
- Teams: 19
- Champions: Garda (1st title); Con McGrath (captain)
- Runners-up: St Nicholas'; Donie O'Donovan (captain)

Tournament statistics
- Matches played: 18
- Goals scored: 48 (2.67 per match)
- Points scored: 202 (11.22 per match)

The 1950 Cork Senior Football Championship was the 62nd staging of the Cork Senior Football Championship since its establishment by the Cork County Board in 1887. The draw for the opening round fixtures took place on 29 January 1950. The championship ran from 16 April to 18 October 1950.

Collins entered the championship as the defending champions, however, they were beaten by St Nicholas' in a quarter-final replay.

On 8 October 1950, Garda won the championship following a 3–07 to 2–05 defeat of St. Nicholas' in the final at the Cork Athletic Grounds. This remains their only championship title.

== Results ==
=== First round ===
16 April 1950 First round	Carbery	1-03 - 4-06	Collins	Dunmanway Grounds

16 April 1950 First round	Fermoy	2-12 - 0-04	Duhallow	Mallow Town Park

16 April 1950 First round	Castlemagner	3-05 - 1-00 (Void)	Clonakilty	Cork Athletic Grounds

- The match was declared void and Clonakilty declared the winners after an objection by Clonakilty was upheld.

16 April 1950 First round	Imokilly	1-03 - 2-04	St Patrick's	Cobh Grounds

16 April 1950 First round	Muskerry	1-02 - 2-03	Millstreet	Macroom Grounds

23 April 1950 First round	St Vincent's	2-03 - 0-05	Seandún	Cork Athletic Grounds

30 April 1950 First round	St Nicholas'	1-08 - 0-05	Macroom	Coachford Grounds

7 May 1950 First round	St Finbarr's	1-08 - 1-05	Commercials	Cork Athletic Grounds

14 May 1950 First round	Garda	1-14 - 1-03	Beara	Glengarriff Grounds

- University College Cork received a bye in this round.

=== Second round ===
18 June 1950 Second round	University College Cork	0-03 - 1-04	Fermoy	Cork Athletic Grounds

18 June 1950 Second round	Clonakilty	2-06 - 1-04	St Vincent's	Clonakilty Town Park

=== Quarter-finals ===
16 June 1950 Quarter-final	St Nicholas'	1-04 - 1-04	Collins	The Mardyke

18 June 1950 Quarter-final	Millstreet	1-11 - 1-05	St Patrick's	Macroom Grounds

9 July 1950 Quarter-final	Garda	2-08 - 0-05	St Finbarr's	The Mardyke

2 August 1950 Quarter-final replay	St Nicholas'	5-02 - 2-08	Collins	The Mardyke

6 August 1950 Quarter-final	Clonakilty	2-07 - 0-11	Fermoy	Cork Athletic Grounds

=== Semi-finals ===
3 September 1950 Semi-final	Garda	1-04 - 0-04	Clonakilty	Cork Athletic Grounds

24 September 1950 Semi-final	St Nicholas'	3-08 - 0-04	Millstreet	Macroom Grounds

=== Final ===
8 October 1950 Final	Garda	3-07 - 2-05	St. Nicholas'	Cork Athletic Grounds
