= Roger Tuohy =

Irish hurler

Personal information
- Native name: Ruairí Ó Tuathaigh (Irish)
- Born: 1944 (79 years old) Cork, Ireland
- Occupation: painting contractor
- Height: 5 ft 2.5 in (158.8 cm)

Sport
- Sport: Hurling
- Position: Midfield
Club
- Years: Club
- 1960s-1980s: Na Piarsaigh
Club titles
- Cork titles: 0
Inter-county
Years	County	Apps (scores)
1969	Cork	4 (0-00)
Inter-county titles
- Munster titles: 0
- All-Irelands: 1
- NHL: 1
- All Stars: 0

Roger Tuohy (born 1945 in Cork, Ireland) is an Irish former sportsman. He played hurling with his local club Na Piarsaigh and was a member of the Cork senior inter-county team in the 1960s. Tuohy won an All-Ireland runners-up medal, one Munster title and a National Hurling League title with Cork in 1969.
