= Mossie Finn =

Irish hurler

Personal information
- Native name: Muiris Ó Finn (Irish)
- Born: 1931 Togher, Cork, Ireland
- Died: 31 March 2009 (aged 78) Douglas, Cork, Ireland
- Occupation: Oil delivery man

Sport
- Sport: Hurling
- Position: Right wing-forward
Club
- Years: Club
- St Finbarr's
Club titles
- Cork titles: 1
Inter-county*
Years	County	Apps (scores)
1951-1956	Cork	2 (0-3)
Inter-county titles
- Munster titles: 0
- All-Irelands: 0
- NHL: 0
- *Inter County team apps and scores correct as of 17:11, 15 November 2014.

Maurice "Mossie" Finn (1931 - 31 March 2009) was an Irish hurler who played as a right wing-forward at senior level for the Cork county team.

Born in Togher, Finn first arrived on the inter-county scene at the age of seventeen when he first linked up with the Cork minor team. He made his senior debut during the 1951 championship. Finn went on to play a brief role for Cork, and won one All-Ireland medal and one Munster medal as a non-playing substitute.

At club level Finn was a one-time championship medallist with St Finbarr's.

Finn retired from inter-county hurling following the conclusion of the 1956 championship.

== Honours ==
St Finbarr's

- Cork Senior Hurling Championship (1): 1955

Cork

- All-Ireland Senior Hurling Championship (1): 1952 (sub)
- Munster Senior Hurling Championship (1): 1952 (sub)
