= Gus Harrington =

Irish Gaelic footballer (born 1943)

Personal information
- Native name: Agaistín Ó hArrachtáin (Irish)
- Nickname: Gussie
- Born: 1943 (age 82–83) Togher, Cork, Ireland
- Height: 5 ft 9 in (175 cm)

Sport
- Sport: Gaelic football
- Position: Right wing-back
Club
- Years: Club
- St Finbarr's
Club titles
- Cork titles: 0
Inter-county*
Years	County	Apps (scores)
1964-1966	Cork	2 (0-00)
Inter-county titles
- Munster titles: 0
- All-Irelands: 0
- NFL: 0
- *Inter County team apps and scores correct as of 00:01, 15 July 2014.

Gus Harrington (born 1943) is an Irish former Gaelic footballer who played as a right wing-back at senior level for the Cork county team.

Born in Togher, Cork, Harrington first played competitive football in his youth. He arrived on the inter-county scene at the age of seventeen when he first linked up with the Cork minor team, before later joining the under-21 side. He made his senior debut during the 1964 championship. Harrington had a brief inter-county career and won one Munster medal as a non-playing substitute.

At club level Harrington played with St Finbarr's.

Throughout his inter-county career, Harrington made just two championship appearances for Cork. His retirement came following the conclusion of the 1966 championship.

== Honours ==
Cork

- Munster Senior Football Championship (1): 1966 (sub)
- Munster Under-21 Football Championship (1): 1963
- All-Ireland Minor Football Championship (1): 1961
- Munster Minor Football Championship (2): 1960, 1961
