= Florrie O'Mahony =

Irish hurler (born 1933)

Personal information
- Native name: Flaithrí Ó Mathúna (Irish)
- Nickname: Florrie
- Born: 1933 Blackrock, Cork, Ireland

Sport
- Sport: Hurling
- Position: Centre-forward
Club
- Years: Club
- Blackrock
Club titles
- Cork titles: 2
Inter-county*
| Years | County | Apps (scores) |
| 1953-1957 | Cork | 4 (0-02) |
Inter-county titles
- Munster titles: 1
- All-Irelands: 0
- NHL: 0
- *Inter County team apps and scores correct as of 20:45, 4 March 2019.

Florence O'Mahony (born 1933) was an Irish hurler who played for Cork Senior Championship club Blackrock and at inter-county level with the Cork senior hurling team. He usually lined out as a centre-back but could also be deployed as a right corner-forward.

== Honours ==
Blackrock

- Cork Senior Hurling Championship (1): 1956, 1961

Cork

- Munster Senior Hurling Championship (1): 1956
- All-Ireland Minor Hurling Championship (1): 1951
- Munster Minor Hurling Championship (1): 1951
