= Christy O'Shea =

Irish hurler

Personal information
- Native name: Criostóir Ó Sé (Irish)
- Born: 1936 Sunday's Well, Cork, Ireland
- Died: 30 July 2016 (aged 80) Fairhill, Cork, Ireland
- Occupation: Oil refinery worker
- Height: 5 ft 7 in (170 cm)

Sport
- Sport: Hurling
- Position: Left wing-forward
Club
- Years: Club
- St Vincent's
Club titles
- Cork titles: 0
Inter-county
Years	County	Apps (scores)
1955-1957	Cork	7 (0-01)
Inter-county titles
- Munster titles: 1
- All-Irelands: 0
- NHL: 0

Christopher O'Shea (1936 - 30 July 2016) was an Irish hurler who played for Cork Championship club St Vincent's. He was a member of the Cork senior hurling team between 1955 and 1957, during which time he usually lined out as a left wing-forward.

== Honours ==
Cork

- Munster Senior Hurling Championship (1): 1956
- All-Ireland Junior Hurling Championship (1): 1955
- Munster Junior Hurling Championship (1): 1955
