= 1964 Cork Senior Football Championship =

Football event

- Dates: 5 April - 15 November 1964
- Teams: 24
- Champions: University College Cork (6th title); David Geaney (captain)
- Runners-up: Carbery

The 1964 Cork Senior Football Championship was the 76th staging of the Cork Senior Football Championship since its establishment by the Cork County Board in 1887. The draw for the opening fixtures took place at the Cork Convention on 26 January 1964. The championship ran from 5 April to 15 November 1964.

University College Cork entered the championship as the defending champions.

On 15 November 1964, University College Cork won the championship following a 0–12 to 1–06 defeat of Carbery in the final. This was their sixth championship title overall and their second title in succession.

== Team changes ==
=== To Championship ===
Promoted from the Cork Junior Football Championship

- Millstreet

== Results ==
=== Quarter-finals ===
7 June 1964 Quarter-final	Carbery	5-14 - 3-07	Seandún	Castle Grounds
	E Young 1-5, M Hussey 1-3, D O'Donovan 1-1, N Kehilly 1-1, S Davis 1-0, R O'Neill 0-2, J Carroll 0-2.		JJ Kearney 1-3, Pat Sheehan 1-1, T Nott 1-0, Paddy Sheehan 0-2, L Joyce 0-1.	Referee: G Murphy (Valley Rovers)

30 August 1964 Quarter-final	Clonakilty	3-06 - 1-06	Mitchelstown	Cork Athletic Grounds
	F Hayes 1-2, TF Hayes 1-1, C Lane 1-0, P O'Sullivan 0-1, T O'Leary 0-1, D O'Mahony 0-1.		T Monaghan 1-0, N Coughlan 0-3, B Honohan 0-1, M Burke 0-1.	Referee: M O'Connell (St. Vincent's)

6 September 1964 Quarter-final	University College Cork	2-10 - 1-11	Muskerry	Clonaklty Sportsfield
	D Harnedy 1-4, D Philpott 1-1, J O'Halloran 0-4, D Geaney 0-1.		P Galvin 0-3, D McCarthy 0-2, S McCarthy 0-2, K O'Sullivan 0-1, G Buckley 0-1, K Murphy 0-1.	Referee: G Murphy (Valley Rovers)

20 September 1964 Quarter-final	St. Finbarr's	3-08 - 0-06	Millstreet	Coachford Sportsfield
	M Archer 2-2, S McCarthy 1-2, B Studdart 0-1, C Cullinane 0-1, T Mulcahy 0-1, E Philpott 0-1.		W O'Leary 0-4, T Burke 0-1, D Cribben 0-1.

=== Semi-finals ===
20 September 1964 Semi-final	Carbery	1-10 - 1-07	Clonakilty	Rossa Park
	M Bohane 0-5, R O'Neill 1-1, J Carroll 0-1, D Murphy 0-1, D O'Donovan 0-1, S Davis 0-1.		T Hayes 0-3, B Sexton 1-0, D O'Mahony 0-1, F Hayes 0-1, C Lane 0-1, P O'Sullivan 0-1.	Referee: M O'Connell (St. Vincent's)

25 October 1964 Semi-final	University College Cork	1-13 - 1-02	St. Finbarr's	Cork Athletic Grounds
	D Harnedy 0-7, D Geaney 1-1, D Philpott 0-2, J Halloran 0-1, T Mulvihill 0-1, F O'Rourke 0-1.		B Studdert 1-0, D McCarthy 0-1, M McCarthy 0-1.

=== Final ===
15 November 1964 Final	University College Cork	0-12 - 1-06	Carbery	Cork Athletic Grounds
	D Harnedy 0-5, D Geaney 0-2, M Kelly 0-2, D Philpott 0-1, J O'Halloran 0-1, M Fleming 0-1.		R O'Neill 1-0, M Bohane 0-3, J O'Carroll 0-1, D O'Donovan 0-1, N Kehilly 0-1.	Referee: F Halbert (Glenville)
