= Garda GAA (Cork) =

Garda
- Garda
- Founded: 1949
- County: Cork

Senior Club Championships
	All Ireland	Munster champions	Cork champions
Football:	0	0	1

Garda GAA was a Gaelic Athletic Association club based in the city and county of Cork in Ireland. The club was founded in 1949 and was composed of members of the Garda Síochána.

== Honours ==
- Cork Senior Football Championships: 1
  - 1950

== Notable players ==
- Con McGrath
- Paddy O'Driscoll
- Jas Murphy
