= 2025 Cork Junior A Football Championship =

Annual Gaelic football competition season

- Dates: 1 November – 30 November 2025
- Teams: 7
- Sponsor: McCarthy Insurance Group
- Champions: Kilmacabea (1st title); Ian Jennings (captain); Donie O'Donovan (manager)
- Runners-up: Donoughmore; Daniel Forde (captain); Liam O'Hanlon (manager)

Tournament statistics
- Matches played: 6
- Goals scored: 11 (1.83 per match)
- Points scored: 133 (22.17 per match)
- Top scorer(s): Damien Gore (0-15)

The 2025 Cork Junior A Football Championship was the 127th staging of the Cork Junior A Football Championship since its establishment by the Cork County Board in 1895. The championship ran from 1 November to 30 November 2025.

The final was played on 30 November 2025 at SuperValu Páirc Uí Chaoimh in Cork, between Kilmacabea and Donoughmore, in what was their first ever meeting in the final. Kilmacabea won the match by 1–14 to 1–07 to claim their first ever championship title.

Kilmacabea's Damien Gore was the championship's top scorer with 0-15.

== Qualification ==
Division	Championship	Champions	#
Avondhu	North Cork Junior A Football Championship	Charleville	
Carbery	Carbery Junior A Football Championship	Kilmacabea	
Carrigdhoun	South East Junior A Football Championship	Ballygarvan	
Duhallow	Duhallow Junior A Football Championship	Castlemagner	
Imokilly	East Cork Junior A Football Championship	Carrignavar	
Muskerry	Mid Cork Junior A Football Championship	Donoughmore	
Seandún	City Junior A Football Championship	Nemo Rangers	

== Divisional championships ==
=== Duhallow JAFC ===
Semi-Finals
Castlemagner	1–17
Knocknagree	0–17
Kilbrin	2–09
Kanturk	1–13

Final
Castlemagner	1–07
Kanturk	1–06

=== North Cork JAFC ===
Quarter-Finals
Charleville	3–08
Mallow	0–08
Killavullen	3–12
Ballyclough	0–14

Semi-Finals
Ballyhooly	1–04
Charleville	2–10
Liscarroll Churchtown Gaels	1–13
Killavullen	1–10

Final
Charleville	0–18
Liscarroll Churchtown Gaels	0–13

=== Mid Cork JAFC ===
Quarter-Finals
Ballincollig	1–11
Aghinagh	3–16
Donoughmore	1–18
Béal Átha'n Ghaorthaidh	1–07

Semi-Finals
Éire Óg	0–13
Aghinagh	2–08
Grenagh	0–07
Donoughmore	2–14

Final
Aghinagh	0–15, 2–14
Donoughmore	1–12, 2–15

=== Carbery JAFC ===
Quarter-Finals
Tadhg McCarthaigh's	1–14
Goleen	1–13
St Mary's	0–10
Diarmuid Ó Mathúna's	0–09
Kilmacabea	3–08
Barryroe	0–09
Kilbrittain	1–11
Argideen Rangers	2–05

Semi-Finals
Tadhg McCarthaigh's	0–21
St Mary's	2–17
Kilmacabea	1–25
Kilbrittain	3–15

Final
St Mary's	0–10
Kilmacabea	0–15

=== Cork City JAFC ===
Quarter-Final Playoffs
Glanmire	0–10
Douglas	2–11

Quarter-Finals
Whitechurch	0–12
Douglas	0–15

Semi-Finals
White's Cross	2–13
Nemo Rangers	3–14
Mayfield	2–13
Douglas	0–14

Final
Nemo Rangers	3–15
Mayfield	2–11

=== South East JAFC ===
Semi-Finals
Ballygarvan	2–11
Ballymartle	1–12
Carrigaline	2–13
Shamrocks	2–08

Final
Ballygarvan	1–14
Carrigaline	0–16

=== East Cork JAFC ===
Quarter-Finals
Castlemartyr	1–06
Carrignavar	3–06
Erin's Own	0–07
Aghada	0–06

Semi-Finals
Carrigtwohill	1–10
Carrignavar	1–11
Youghal	2–10
Erin's Own	5–16

Final
Carrignavar	3–12
Erin's Own	1–08

Relegation playoff

Lisgoold 5–13 — 1–14 Glenbower Rovers

== County championship ==
=== Bracket ===
Quarter-Finals
Nemo Rangers (Seandún)	2–11
Castlemagner (Duhallow)	1–08
Charleville (Avondhu)	0–15
Ballygarvan (Carrigdhoun)	0–11
Carrignavar (Imokilly)	0–05
Kilmacabea (Carbery)	1–11

Semi-Finals
Nemo Rangers (Seandún)	0–07
Donoughmore (Muskerry)	3–19
Charleville (Avondhu)	0–14
Kilmacabea (Carbery)	2–11

Final
Donoughmore (Muskerry)	1–07
Kilmacabea (Carbery)	1–14

=== Quarter-finals ===
1 November 2025 Quarter-final	Carrignavar	0-05 - 1-11	Kilmacabea	Páirc Naomh Eoin
	C Murphy 0-2, S O'Donoghue 0-2, S Whelan 0-1.	Report	D Gore 0-8, D O'Donovan 1-1, E Shanahan 0-1, D O'Callaghan 0-1.

2 November 2025 Quarter-final	Nemo Rangers	2-11 - 1-08	Castlemagner	Mourneabbey Grounds
	J Lyons 1-3, J Philpott 1-0, D O'Sullivan 0-3, G Barrett 0-3, P O'Dwyer 0-1, J O'Brien 0-1.	Report	Cillian O'Sullivan 1-1, Cormac O'Sullivan 0-4, D Linehan 0-2, E Magner 0-1.

8 November 2025 Quarter-final	Charleville	0-15 - 0-11	Ballygarvan	Glenville Grounds
	J Callaghan 0-5 (2 2pt f, 0-1 f), R Carroll 0-3, D Casey, D Butler 0-2 each, J Buckley, C Buckley, D Fitzgibbon 0-1 each.	Report	N Dowd 0-4 (1 2pt), D O'Connor 0-2 (2pt), E O'Connor 0-2 (0-1 f), D Mackey 0-1, M O'Mahony 0-1, S Brady 0-1.

=== Semi-finals ===
22 November 2025 Semi-final	Donoughmore	3-19 - 0-07	Nemo Rangers	Glenville Grounds
	S Barrett 2-1, D Holland 1-4 (1 tp), D McDonnell 0-5 (1 tp), D Keating 0-3 (0-2 f), G O’Sullivan 0-2 (tpf), K O’Connell, A Dinan, R Honohan, D Morrissey 0-1 each.	Report	J Lyons 0-4 (0-3 f), B Twohig, G Barrett, S O’Dwyer 0-1 each.

22 November 2025 Semi-final	Charleville	0-14 - 2-11	Kilmacabea	Páirc Uí Rinn
	D Butler 0-7 (2tp, 1f), J O’Callaghan 0-3 (1f), J Smith 0-3 (1tp, 1 45), R Carroll 0-1.	Report	I Jennings 1-2 (1tp), D Gore 0-5 (1tp, 1f), L McCarthy 1-0, D McCarthy, D O’Callaghan, D O’Donovan, E Shanahan 0-1 each.

=== Final ===
30 November 2025 Final	Donoughmore	1-07 - 1-14	Kilmacabea	SuperValu Páirc Uí Chaoimh
	G O’Sullivan 1-4 (0-1 f, 0-1 45), D McDonnell 0-2, S Barrett 0-1.	Report	E Shanahan 0-5 (1 2pt), R Shanahan 1-0, C McCarthy (1 2pt f), I Jennings (1 2pt), D Gore (0-1 f) 0-2 each, K Whelton, L McCarthy, D O’Donovan 0-1 each.	Referee: A O'Connor (Ballygarvan)

== Championship statistics ==
=== Top scorers ===
Rank	Player	Club	Tally	Total	Matches	Average
1	Damien Gore	Kilmacabea	0-15	15	3	5.00
2	Jason Lyons	Nemo Rangers	1-07	10	2	5.00
3	Gavin O'Sullivan	Donoughmore	1-06	9	2	4.50
3	Darren Butler	Charleville	0-09	8	2	4.50
5	Scott Barrett	Donoughmore	2-02	8	2	4.00
5	Jack O'Callaghan	Charleville	0-08	8	2	4.00
