= 2018 Cork Junior A Football Championship =

120th staging of the Cork Junior A Football Championship

- Dates: 15 September – 27 October 2018
- Teams: 16
- Sponsor: Evening Echo
- Champions: Dromtarriffe (4th title); Séamus O'Sullivan (captain); James McAuliffe (manager)
- Runners-up: Kilmacabea; Niall Hayes (captain); Noel McCarthy (manager)

Tournament statistics
- Matches played: 17
- Goals scored: 42 (2.47 per match)
- Points scored: 378 (22.24 per match)
- Top scorer(s): Damien Gore (0–29)

The 2018 Cork Junior A Football Championship was the 120th staging of the Cork Junior A Football Championship since its establishment by the Cork County Board. The draw for the opening round fixtures took place on 10 December 2017. The championship ran from 15 September to 27 October 2018.

The final was played on 27 October 2018 at Páirc Uí Rinn in Cork, between Dromtarriffe and Kilmacabea, in what was their first ever championship meeting. Dromtarriffe won the match by 2–09 to 2–08 to claim their fourth championship title overall and a first title in 59 years.

Kilmacabea's Damien Gore was the championship's top scorer with 0–29.

== Qualification ==
Division	Championship	Champions	Runners-up
Avondhu	North Cork Junior A Football Championship	Charleville	Buttevant
Beara	Beara Junior A Football Championship	Garnish	Urhan
Carbery	South West Junior A Football Championship	Kilmacabea	Tadhg Mac Carthaigh
Carrigdhoun	South East Junior A Football Championship	Ballymartle	Valley Rovers
Duhallow	Duhallow Junior A Football Championship	Boherbue	Dromtarriffe
Imokilly	East Cork Junior A Football Championship	Midleton	Fr O'Neill's
Muskerry	Mid Cork Junior A Football Championship	Iveleary	Canovee
Seandún	City Junior A Football Championship	Delanys	St Michael's

== Results ==
=== Round 1 ===
15 September 2018 Round 1	Buttevant	2–04 – 0–13	Ivealry	Páirc Eoin Mhic Charthaigh
	R Fowley 1–1, M Lenahan 1–1, P Mannix 0–1, K Lenahan 0–1.		C Óg Jones 0–5, J Creedon 0–2, G O'Riordan 0–2, B Murphy 0–1, B O'Leary 0–1, C Galvin 0–1, L Kearney 0–1.

21 September 2018 Round 1	Boherbue	1–10 – 0–05	Canovee	Mallow GAA Complex
	J O'Connor 1–2, A O'Connor 0–3, D McCarthy 0–2, K Cremin 0–1, G O'Sullivan 0–1, D O'Connor 0–1.		J Moynihan 0–2, S O'Connor 0–2, D O'Sullivan 0–1.

22 September 2018 Round 1	Delanys	1–13 – 0–13	Tadhg Mac Carthaigh	St Mary's Park
	C McCarthy 0–8, R Downey 1–2, C Healy 0–1, J Hosford 0–1, G Gould 0–1.		B O'Driscoll 0–5, C O'Driscoll 0–5, M O'Driscoll 0–1, S O'Driscoll 0–1, G O'Neill 0–1.

22 September 2018 Round 1	Midleton	2–12 – 2–11	Urhan	Kilmichael Grounds
	C Moloney 1–1, J Comer 0–4, K Mulcahy 1–0, C Beausang 0–3, C Hurley 0–2, E Moloney 0–1, S O'Farrell 0–1.		J O'Neill 0–5, C Lowney 1–1, E Lowney 1–0, C Harrington 0–4, P O'Shea 0–1.

22 September 2018 Round 1	Fr O'Neill's	1–11 – 3–20	Kilmacabea	Jack Fitzgerald Memorial Park
	B Dunne 1–0, E Motherway 0–3, C Broderick 0–3, D Harrington 0–2, T Millerick 0–1, J Hankard 0–1, P McMahon 0–1.		D Gore 0–9, I Jennings 1–5, G O'Donovan 1–3, T Nyhan 1–1, C McCarthy 0–1, D O'Donovan 0–1.

22 September 2018 Round 1	Ballymartle	0–16 – 1–06	Garnish	Kilmichael Grounds
	B Corry 0–5, R Cahalane 0–3, J McCarthy 0–3, J Ryan 0–2, L Corry 0–1, C Healy 0–1, K McCarthy 0–1.		P O'Neill 0–4, H O'Sullivan 1–0, B Dudley 0–1, F Sheehan 0–1.

26 September 2018 Round 1	Charleville	0–09 – 1–13	Dromtarriffe	Mallow GAA Complex
	M Kavanagh 0–3, C O'Carroll 0–1, D O'Flynn 0–1, J Doyle 0–1, J Kennedy 0–1, J Barry 0–1, J O'Callaghan 0–1.		E Murphy 0–7, S Collins 1–0, D O'Donoghue 0–3, C O'Callaghan 0–2, B O'Keeffe 0–1.

2 October 2018 Round 1	St Michael's	4–14 – 1–10	Valley Rovers	Páirc Uí Rinn
	D Hurley 4–5, I Giltinan 0–2, A O'Connell 0–1, D O'Sullivan 0–1, M Mulconry 0–1, L Grainger 0–1, P Kennedy 0–1, D Crowley 0–1, A Coyne 0–1.		J Murphy 1–3, P Hurley 0–4, S Mulherne 0–1, M Savik 0–1, G Deane 0–1.

=== Quarter-finals ===
6 October 2018 Quarter-final	Boherbue	1–10 – 0–13	Kilmacabea	Kilmurry Grounds
	J O'Connor 1–7, A O'Connor 0–1, D McCarthy 0–1, J Casey 0–1.		D O'Donovan 0–5, D Gore 0–3, R O'Sullivan 0–3, D McCarthy 0–1, T Nyhan 0–1.

6 October 2018 Quarter-final	Midleton	0–04 – 3–22	Ivealery	Ballincollig Grounds
	J Comer 0–3, C Gunning 0–1.		C Óg Jones 2–9, B O'Leary 1–2, C O'Leary 0–3, S O'Leary 0–2, F McSweeney Jnr 0–2, D O'Sullivan 0–1, F McSweeney Snr 0–1, D O'Riordan 0–1, J Creedon 0–1.

7 October 2018 Quarter-final	Ballymartle	3–09 – 2–12	Delanys	Brinny Sportsfield
	K Spriggs 1–1, R Cahalane 1–1, J McCarthy 0–4, P Geary 1–0, L Corry 0–1, S O'Mahony 0–1, D Edmunds 0–1.		C McCarthy 1–4, C Ealaighthe 0–4, G Gould 1–0, R Downey 0–2, K Foley 0–1, R Jestin 0–1.

13 October 2018 Quarter-final replay	Boherbue	0–09 – 0–15	Kilmacabea	Jack Fitzgerald Memorial Park
	J O'Connor 0–5, B O'Gorman 0–2, K Cremin 0–2.		D Gore 0–6, D O'Donovan 0–4, R O'Sullivan 0–2, D McCarthy 0–1, J Collins 0–1, I Jennings 0–1.

13 October 2018 Quarter-final replay	Ballymartle	1–09 – 1–12	Delanys	Éire Óg Grounds
	J McCarthy 1–2, J Ryan 0–3, B Corry 0–1, D O'Leary 0–1, D McCarthy 0–1, R Cahalane 0–1.		G Gould 1–1, R Downey 0–4, K Hosford 0–2, D Aherne 0–2, C Healy 0–2, R Foley 0–1.

16 October 2018 Quarter-final	Dromtarriffe	2–11 – 2–04	St Michael's	Mallow GAA Complex
	S Collins 2–2, D O'Keeffe 0–4, E Murphy 0–2, S O'Sullivan 0–2, M Healy 0–1.		D Mann 1–0 (og), D O'Neill 1–0, D Hurley 0–2, A O'Connell 0–2.

=== Semi-finals ===
20 October 2018 Semi-final	Delanys	1–10 – 1–17	Kilmacabea	Charlie Hurley Park
	C McCarthy 0–7, R Downey 1–1, K Foley 0–1, D Aherne 0–1.		D O'Donovan 0–6, D Gore 0–6, L Thompson 1–1, I Jennings 0–1, R O'Sullivan 0–1, D McCarthy 0–1, C Sweetnam 0–1.

21 October 2018 Semi-final	Dromtarriffe	1–13 – 1–11	Ivealry	Castle Grounds
	D O'Keeffe 1–6, E Murphy 0–2, C O'Callaghan 0–2, D O'Donoghue 0–1, S Collins 0–1, A Buckley 0–1.		B O'Leary 1–1, C Vaughan 0–4, F McSweeney Snr 0–1, F McSweeney Jnr 0–1, C O'Leary 0–1, S O'Leary 0–1, C Óg Jones 0–1, B Cronin 0–1.

=== Final ===
28 October 2018 Final	Dromtarriffe	2–09 – 2–08	Kilmacabea	Páirc Uí Rinn
	D O’Connor (2–0), D O’Keeffe (0–5, 4f), S Collins (1f), C O’Callaghan, E Murphy and J Murphy (0–1 each).		D Gore (0–5, 1 free), T Nyhan (1–1), I Jennings (1–0), Daniel O’Donovan (0–2, frees).	Referee: P O'Leary (Kilmurry)

== Championship statistics ==
=== Top scorers ===
Overall

Rank	Player	Club	Tally	Total	Matches	Average
1	Damien Gore	Kilmacabea	0–29	29	5	5.80
2	Ciarán McCarthy	Delanys	1–19	22	4	5.50
3	Chris Óg Jones	Iveleary	2–15	21	3	7.00
4	Jerry O'Connor	Boherbue	2–14	20	3	6.66
5	David Hurley	St Michael's	4–07	19	2	9.50
6	Daniel O'Keeffe	Dromtarriffe	1–15	18	3	6.00
6	Daniel O'Donovan	Kilmacabea	0–18	18	5	3.60
8	Roy Downey	Delanys	2–09	15	4	3.75
9	Shane Collins	Dromtarriffe	3–04	13	4	3.25
10	Ian Jennings	Kilmacabea	2–07	13	5	2.60
