= 1995 Cork Junior A Football Championship =

- Dates: 1 October – 26 November 1995
- Teams: 8
- Champions: Glenville (1st title); Seán Hegarty (captain)
- Runners-up: Tadhg Mac Carthaigh; Denis O'Sullivan (captain)

Tournament statistics
- Matches played: 8
- Goals scored: 8 (1 per match)
- Points scored: 136 (17 per match)

The 1995 Cork Junior A Football Championship was the 97th staging of the Cork Junior A Football Championship since its establishment by Cork County Board in 1895. The championship ran from 1 October to 26 November 1995.

The final was played on 26 November 1995 at Páirc Naomh Eoin in Newcestown, between Glenville and Tadhg Mac Carthaigh, in what was their first ever meeting in the final. Glenville won the match by 0–08 to 0–05 to claim their first ever championship title.

== Qualification ==
Division	Championship	Champions
Avondhu	North Cork Junior A Football Championship	Mitchelstown
Beara	Beara Junior A Football Championship	Garnish
Carbery	South West Junior A Football Championship	Tadhg Mac Carthaigh
Carrigdhoun	South East Junior A Football Championship	Valley Rovers
Duhallow	Duhallow Junior A Football Championship	Domtarriffe
Imokilly	East Cork Junior A Football Championship	Glenville
Muskerry	Mid Cork Junior A Football Championship	Clondrohid
Seandún	City Junior A Football Championship	Nemo Rangers

== Results ==
=== Quarter-finals ===
1 October 1995 Quarter-final	Tadhg Mac Carthaigh	0–14 – 0–08	Garnish	Wolfe Tone Park

8 October 1995 Quarter-final	Glenville	1–09 – 0–06	Mitchelstown

15 October 1995 Quarter-final	Dromtarriffe	0–11 – 0–06	Valley Rovers	Coachford Grounds

22 October 1995 Quarter-final	Clondrohid	1–17 – 2–09	Nemo Rangers

=== Semi-finals ===
29 October 1995 Semi-final	Tadhg Mac Carthaigh	0–09 – 1–06	Dromtarriffe	Inchigeelagh Grounds

5 November 1995 Semi-final replay	Tadhg Mac Carthaigh	0–10 – 1–05	Dromtarriffe	Inchigeelagh Grounds

12 November 1995 Semi-final	Glenville	2–06 – 0–07	Clondrohid	O'Connell Park

=== Final ===
26 November 1995 Final	Glenville	0–08 – 0–05	Tadhg Mac Carthaigh	Páirc Naomh Eoin
