= 2013 Cork Junior A Football Championship =

- Dates: 6 September – 10 November 2013
- Teams: 8
- Sponsor: Evening Echo
- Champions: Mitchelstown (2nd title); Shane Beston (captain); Larry Tompkins (manager)
- Runners-up: St Colum's; Shane McSweeney (captain); Dan Hurley (manager)

Tournament statistics
- Matches played: 7
- Goals scored: 11 (1.57 per match)
- Points scored: 115 (16.43 per match)
- Top scorer(s): Shane Beston (1–12); Denis McSweeney (0–15)

The 2013 Cork Junior A Football Championship was the 115th staging of the Cork Junior A Football Championship since its establishment by Cork County Board in 1895. The championship ran from 6 September to 10 November 2013.

The final was played on 10 November 2013 at Páirc Uí Rinn in Cork, between Mitchelstown and St Colum's, in what was their first ever meeting in the final. Mitchelstown won the match by 0–12 to 2–04 to claim their second championship title overall and a first title in 52 years.

Shane Beston and Denis McSweeney were the championship's top scorers.

== Qualification ==
Division	Championship	Representatives
Avondhu	North Cork Junior A Football Championship	Mitchelstown
Beara	Beara Junior A Football Championship	Urhan
Carbery	South West Junior A Football Championship	St Colum's
Carrigdhoun	South East Junior A Football Championship	Belgooly
Duhallow	Duhallow Junior A Football Championship	Lyre
Imokilly	East Cork Junior A Football Championship	Glenbower Rovers
Muskerry	Mid Cork Junior A Football Championship	Kilmichael
Seandún	City Junior A Football Championship	St Finbarr's

== Results ==
=== Quarter-finals ===
6 September 2013 Quarter-final	Mitchelstown	2–09 – 1–06	Kilmichael	Páirc Uí Rinn
	S Beston 1–3, J Cott 1–1, M Walsh 0–2, L Flynn 0–1, D Dineen 0–1, S Cahill 0–1.		J O'Leary 1–2, F Twomey 0–3, S Foley 0–1.

12 October 2013 Quarter-final	St Finbarr's	1–13 – 1–09	Lyre	Jack Fitzgerald Memorial Park
	C Madden 1–2, A Murphy 0–4, C McCarthy 0–3, I Power 0–1, L Arslan 0–1, D Comyns 0–1, A Lyne 0–1.		D Murphy 1–0, T Murphy 0–3, D Roche 0–3, S Murphy 0–1, M Kearney 0–1, B O'Driscoll 0–1.

12 October 2013 Quarter-final	St Colum's	1–09 – 0–07	Garnish	Adrigole Grounds
	D McSweeney 0–6, JP O'Sullivan 1–0, S Cronin 0–1, A O'Connor 0–1, E O'Sullivan 0–1.		S Terry O'Sullivan 0–3, F Sheehan 0–1, D Sheehan 0–1, D Harrington 0–1, F Sheehan 0–1.

24 October 2013 Quarter-final	Glenbower Rovers	0–07 – 0–06	Belgooly	Páirc Uí Rinn
	D Cahill 0–3, S Lyons 0–1, C Fogarty 0–1, K Lane 0–1, S Harnedy 0–1.		R Dwyer 0–3, R Power 0–1, A Daly 0–1, P Dwyer 0–1.

=== Semi-finals ===
20 October 2013 Semi-final	St Colum's	2–07 – 1–04	St Finbarr's	St Mary's Park
	D McSweeney 0–6, S Casey 1–1, A O'Connor 1–0.		A Murphy 0–3, P Harte 1–0, C McCarthy 0–1.

2 November 2013 Quarter-final	Mitchelstown	0–11 – 0–08	Glenbower Rovers	Páirc Uí Rinn
	S Beston 0–5, J Sheehan 0–1, D Dineen 0–1, M Walsh 0–1, J Cott 0–1, S Cahill 0–1, P Molloy 0–1.		K Lane 0–5, D Cahill 0–1, S Lyons 0–1, S Harnedy 0–1.

=== Final ===
10 November 2013 Final	Mitchelstown	0–12 – 2–04	St Colum's	Páirc Uí Rinn
	S Beston 0–4 (one free), J Sheehan (frees), S Cahill 0–3 each, M Walsh, D Dineen 0–1 each.	Report	A O’Connor, T Harrington 1–0 each, D McSweeney 0–3 (one free), S O’Shea 0–1.	Referee: D O'Leary (Kiskeam)

== Championship statistics ==
=== Top scorers ===
Rank	Player	Club	Tally	Total	Matches	Average
1	Shane Beston	Mitchelstown	1–12	15	3	5.00
1	Denis McSweeney	St Colum's	0–15	15	3	5.00
3	Alan O'Connor	St Colum's	2–01	7	3	2.33
3	Adrian Murphy	St Finabrr's	0–07	7	2	3.50
5	Kieran Lane	Glenbower Rovers	0–06	6	2	3.00
