= 2012 Cork Junior A Football Championship =

- Dates: 15 September – 4 November 2012
- Teams: 8
- Champions: Rockchapel (2nd title); Kevin Collins (captain); Tom Doody (manager)
- Runners-up: Kilmurry; Eoin Barrett (captain)

Tournament statistics
- Matches played: 8
- Goals scored: 15 (1.88 per match)
- Points scored: 140 (17.5 per match)
- Top scorer(s): William Buckley (1–13)

The 2012 Cork Junior A Football Championship was the 114th staging of the Cork Junior A Football Championship since its establishment by Cork County Board in 1895. The championship ran from 15 September to 4 November 2012.

The final was played on 4 November 2012 at Páirc Uí Rinn in Cork, between Rockchapel and Kilmurry, in what was their first ever meeting in the final. After a draw and a replay, Rockchapel won the match by 1–07 to 0–07 to claim their second championship title overall and a first title in 25 years.

Kilmurry's William Buckley was the championship's top scorer with 1–13.

== Qualification ==
Division	Championship	Representatives
Avondhu	North Cork Junior A Football Championship	Ballyclough
Beara	Beara Junior A Football Championship	Urhan
Carbery	South West Junior A Football Championship	Tadhg Mac Carthaigh
Carrigdhoun	South East Junior A Football Championship	Ballinhassig
Duhallow	Duhallow Junior A Football Championship	Rockchapel
Imokilly	East Cork Junior A Football Championship	Glenbower Rovers
Muskerry	Mid Cork Junior A Football Championship	Kilmurry
Seandún	City Junior A Football Championship	St Finbarr's

== Results ==
=== Quarter-final ===
15 September 2012 Quarter-final	Kilmurry	0–09 – 1–03	Ballinhassig	Brinny Sportsfield
	W Buckley 0–4, J Buckley 0–3, J Kelleher 0–1, D O'Halloran 0–1.		D O'Sullivan 1–0, S Dineen 0–1, P Coomey 0–1, F O'Leary 0–1.

23 September 2012 Quarter-final	Urhan	0–06 – 0–08	Glenbower Rovers	St Mary's
	C Harrington 0–4, V Lehane 0–2.		J O'Connor 0–2, K Lane 0–2, J Deane 0–2, J Budds 0–1, S Harnedy 0–1.

23 September 2012 Quarter-final	Ballyclough	3–11 – 1–14	St Finbarr's	Castlelyons Grounds
	C O'Neill 1–2, S Smith 1–2, T O'Shea 0–5, P O'Flynn 1–0, P Carroll 0–1, M Heffernan 0–1.		P Harte 1–1, C O'Sullivan 0–4, D O'Leary 0–3, D O'Brien 0–2, R Browner 0–2, J Fitzpatrick 0–1, I Power 0–1.

29 September 2012 Quarter-final	Rockchapel	2–10 – 1–10	Tadhg Mac Carthaigh	Castle Grounds
	DJ O'Sullivan 1–3, L Collins 0–5, I Guiney 1–1, J O'Callaghan 0–1.		C O'Sullivan 1–6, C O'Driscoll 0–1, T Deasy 0–1, K Barrett 0–1, B O'Driscoll 0–1.

=== Semi-finals ===
6 October 2012 Semi-final	Kilmurry	2–12 – 1–10	Ballyclough	Riverstown Sportsfield
	J Kelleher 1–3, W Buckley 1–2, D O'Halloran 0–4, G Barrett 0–1, J Buckley 0–1, A O'Sullivan 0–1.		C O'Neill 1–7, E O'Connor 0–1, S Smyth 0–1, P O'Flynn 0–1.

13 October 2013 Semi-final	Rockchapel	2–11 – 0–11	Glenbower Rovers	Páirc Uí Rinn
	S Hickey 2–3, DJ O'Sullivan 0–2, I Guiney 0–2, J Forrest 0–2, L Collins 0–1, D Curtin 0–1.		J Deane 0–5, S Harnedy 0–3, K Lane 0–1, J O'Connor 0–1, S Long 0–1.

=== Final ===
21 October 2012 Final	Rockchapel	1–04 – 0–07	Kilmurry	Páirc Uí Rinn
	I Guiney 0–3 (0-2f), J Forrest 1–0, L Collins 0-1f.	Report	W Buckley 0–3 (0-2f), J White, D Creedon, D O’Halloran (0-1f), J Buckley 0–1 each.	Referee: E Sheehy (Newcestown)

4 November 2012 Final replay	Rockchapel	1–07 – 0–07	Kilmurry	Páirc Uí Rinn
	S Hickey 1–2, W Murphy 0–2, L Collins (free), D Curtin and I Guiney 0–1 each.	Report	W Buckley 0–4 (0–3 frees), J White, P O’Connell and P O’Sullivan 0–1 each.	Referee: M Collins (Clonakilty)

== Championship statistics ==
=== Top scorers ===
Rank	Player	Club	Tally	Total	Matches	Average
1	William Buckley	Kilmurry	1–13	16	4	4.00
2	Colm O'Neill	Ballyclough	2–09	15	2	7.50
3	Séamus Hickey	Rockchapel	3–05	14	4	3.50
4	Ian Guiney	Rockchapel	1–07	10	4	2.50
5	Colm O'Sullivan	Tadhg Mac Carthaigh	1–06	9	1	9.00
