= 2010 Cork Junior A Football Championship =

112th staging of the Cork Junior A Football Championship

- Dates: 26 September – 31 October 2010
- Teams: 8
- Sponsor: Evening Echo
- Champions: Cloyne (1st title); Brian O'Sullivan (captain)
- Runners-up: White's Cross; Finbarr Kiely (manager)

Tournament statistics
- Matches played: 7
- Goals scored: 9 (1.29 per match)
- Points scored: 115 (16.43 per match)
- Top scorer(s): Ken O'Keeffe (0–15)

The 2010 Cork Junior A Football Championship was the 112th staging of the Cork Junior A Football Championship since its establishment by the Cork County Board. The draw for the opening fixtures took place on 13 December 2009. The championship ran from 26 September to 31 October 2010.

The final was played on 31 October 2010 at Páirc Uí Rinn in Cork, between Cloyne and White's Cross, in what was their first ever meeting in the final. Clyne won the match by 0–10 to 0–09 to claim their first ever championship title.

White's Cross's Ken O'Keeffe was the championship's top scorer with 0–15.

== Qualification ==
Division	Championship	Champions
Avondhu	North Cork Junior A Football Championship	Mitchelstown
Beara	Beara Junior A Football Championship	Urhan
Carbery	South West Junior A Football Championship	Gabriel Rangers
Carrigdhoun	South East Junior A Football Championship	Tracton
Duhallow	Duhallow Junior A Football Championship	Lyre
Imokilly	East Cork Junior A Football Championship	Cloyne
Muskerry	Mid Cork Junior A Football Championship	Blarney
Seandún	City Junior A Football Championship	White's Cross

== Results ==
=== Quarter-finals ===
26 September 2010 Quarter-final	Cloyne	1–08 – 1–04	Urhan	Iveleary Grounds
	Diarmuid O'Sullivan 1–1, Paudie O'Sullivan 0–3, Paul O'Sullivan 0–2, B McCarthy 0–1, M Lynch 0–1.		V Lehane 1–0, C Harrington 0–3, D Healy 0–1.	Referee: D Whyte (St. Mary's)

26 September 2010 Quarter-final	Lyre	2–08 – 1–06	Blarney	Coachford Sportsfield
	D Roche 1–3, T Murphy 1–1, D Murphy 0–3, M Kearney 0–1.		T Hegarty 1–1, R O'Leary 0–2, M Cremin 0–1, P Ahern 0–1, C Foley 0–1.	Referee: D Shorten (St. Mary's)

26 September 2010 Quarter-final	White's Cross	1–11 – 1–09	Gabriel Rangers	Charlie Hurley Park
	K O'Keeffe 0–6, M Kelleher 1–2, D O'Regan 0–1, D Kelly 0–1, E Buckley 0–1.		M Cronin 1–8, E Goggin 0–1.	Referee: S Collins (Carrigaline)

2 October 2010 Quarter-final	Mitchelstown	0–14 – 2–07	Tracton	Glenville Grounds
	S Beston 0–4, A O'Brien 0–3, P Donegan 0–3, D Nugent 0–2, L O'Flynn 0–1, D Moher 0–1.		B Kelleher 1–5, R Walsh 1–0, J Nunan 0–1, C Kelly 0–1.	Referee: J Ryan (Macroom)

=== Semi-finals ===
10 October 2010 Semi-final	White's Cross	0–10 – 0–06	Mitchelstown	Felix Sarsfield Memorial Park
	K O'Keeffe 0–4, D O'Regan 0–1, C Buckley 0–1, D Murnane 0–1, C O'Sullivan 0–1, D Burke 0–1, S Keane 0–1.		A O'Brien 0–2, S Beston 0–1, E Burke 0–1, D Moher 0–1, P Donegan 0–1.	Referee: D O'Leary (Watergrasshill)

16 October 2010 Semi-final	Cloyne	0–07 – 0–06	Lyre	Blarney Grounds
	Paudie O'Sullivan 0–4, Diarmuid O'Sullivan 0–1, C O'Lomasney 0–1, K Cronin 0–1.		B O'Driscoll 0–2, D Roche 0–1, R O'Connor 0–1, C O'Riordan 0–1, K Roche 0–1.	Referee: D Murnane (Macroom)

=== Final ===
31 October 2010 Final	Cloyne	0–10 – 0–09	White's Cross	Páirc Uí Rinn
	Paudie O'Sullivan 0–2, J Nyhan 0–2, Diarmuid O'Sullivan 0–2, E O'Sullivan 0–1, K Cronin 0–1, C O'Lomasney 0–1, K O'Lomasney 0–1.		K O'Keeffe 0–5, D O'Regan 0–1, P O'Sullivan 0–1, E Buckley 0–1, S Keane 0–1.

== Championship statistics ==
=== Top scorers ===
Top scorers overall

Rank	Player	Club	Tally	Total	Matches	Average
1	Ken O'Keeffe	White's Cross	0–15	15	3	5.00
2	Mark Cronin	Gabriel Rangers	1–08	11	1	11.00
3	Paudie O'Sullivan	Cloyne	0–09	9	3	3.00
4	Bernie Kelleher	Tracton	1–05	8	1	8.00
5	Denis Roche	Lyre	1–04	7	2	3.50
5	Diarmuid O'Sullivan	Cloyne	1–04	7	3	2.33

Top scorers in a single game

Rank	Player	Club	Tally	Total	Opposition
1	Mark Cronin	Gabriel Rangers	1–08	11	White's Cross
2	Bernie Kelleher	Tracton	1–05	8	Mitchelstown
3	Denis Roche	Lyre	1–03	6	Blarney
3	Ken O'Keeffe	White's Cross	0–06	6	Gabriel Rangers
5	Murt Kelleher	White's Cross	1–02	5	Gabriel Rangers
5	Ken O'Keeffe	White's Cross	0–05	5	Cloyne
7	Diarmuid O'Sullivan	Cloyne	1–01	4	Urhan
7	Timmy Murphy	Lyre	1–01	4	Blarney
7	Trevor Hegarty	Blarney	1–01	4	Lyre
7	Shane Beston	Mitchelstown	0–04	4	Tracton
7	Ken O'Keeffe	White's Cross	0–04	4	Mitchelstown
7	Paudie O'Sullivan	Cloyne	0–04	4	Lyre
