= 2011 Cork Junior A Football Championship =

113th staging of the Cork Junior A Football Championship

- Dates: 24 September – 11 November 2011
- Teams: 8
- Sponsor: Evening Echo
- Champions: Kanturk (1st title); Eoghan O'Connor (captain); Pádraig Kerrins (manager)
- Runners-up: Mitchelstown; Larry Tompkins (manager)

Tournament statistics
- Matches played: 8
- Goals scored: 12 (1.5 per match)
- Points scored: 155 (19.38 per match)
- Top scorer(s): Donagh Duane (0–18)

The 2011 Cork Junior A Football Championship was the 113th staging of the Cork Junior A Football Championship since its establishment by the Cork County Board. The draw for the opening fixtures took place on 11 December 2010. The championship ran from 24 September to 11 November 2011.

The final was played on 11 November 2010 at Páirc Uí Rinn in Cork, between Kanturk and Mitchelstown, in what was their first ever meeting in the final. Kanturk won the match by 1–20 to 0–04 to claim their first ever championship title.

Kanturk's Donagh Duane was the championship's top scorer with 0–18.

== Qualification ==
Division	Championship	Representatives
Avondhu	North Cork Junior A Football Championship	Mitchelstown
Beara	Beara Junior A Football Championship	Urhan
Carbery	South West Junior A Football Championship	Bandon
Carrigdhoun	South East Junior A Football Championship	Courcey Rovers
Duhallow	Duhallow Junior A Football Championship	Kanturk
Imokilly	East Cork Junior A Football Championship	Glenbower Rovers
Muskerry	Mid Cork Junior A Football Championship	Donoughmore
Seandún	City Junior A Football Championship	St. Finbarr's

== Results ==
=== Quarter-finals ===
24 September 2011 Quarter-final	Courcey Rovers	1–10 – 0–10	Donoughmore	Brinny Sportsfield
	B Hayes 0–6, S Holland 1–2, S Moloney 0–1, J Duggan 0–1.		S Sexton 0–5, A O'Shea 0–2, D Lee 0–1, O Murphy 0–1, B O'Connell 0–1.	Referee: M Collins (Clonakilty)

1 October 2011 Quarter-final	Mitchelstown	0–15 – 0–05	Urhan	Sam Maguire Park
	L Keane 0–4, S Beston 0–3, S Cahill 0–3, A O'Brien 0–2, A McNamara 0–1, L Flynn 0–1, J Sheehan 0–1.		V Lehane 0–2, D Healy 0–2, C Harrington 0–1.	Referee: D Whyte (St. Mary's)

7 October 2011 Quarter-final	Kanturk	2–14 – 1–03	Glenbower Rovers	Mallow GAA Complex
	D Duane 0–10, A Nash 1–1, J Browne 1–0, K Holland 0–2, L McLoughlin 0–1.		S Long 1–0, J Deane 0–2, J O'Connor 0–1.	Referee: P O'Leary (Kilmurry)

8 October 2011 Quarter-final	Bandon	1–10 – 1–10	St. Finbarr's	Páirc Liam Mhic Cárthaigh
	M Sugrue 0–6, A Johnson 1–0, R Moloney 0–2, D Aherne 0–1, J Hickey 0–1.		Denis O'Brien 0–4, T Guiheen 1–0, F Murray 0–3, P Murphy 0–2, E Finn 0–1.

15 October 2011 Quarter-final replay	Bandon	2–13 – 0–14 (aet)	St. Finbarr's	Páirc Liam Mhic Cárthaigh
	D Crowley 1–2, P Crowley 1–0, M Sugrue 0–3, R Payne 0–2, D Aherne 0–2, A Johnson 0–1, R Moloney 0–1, R Crowley 0–1, J Hickey 0–1.		C Madden 0–5, P Murphy 0–3, F Murray 0–2, Dave O'Brien 0–2, Denis O'Brien 0–1, E Finn 0–1.

=== Semi-finals ===
21 October 2011 Semi-final	Kanturk	0–12 – 2–05	Bandon	Páirc Uí Rinn
	D Duane 0–3, L McLoughlin 0–2, A Nash 0–2, A Walsh 0–2, J McLoughlin 0–1, W Murphy 0–1, M Sheehy 0–1.		D Crowley 1–1, P Crowley 1–0, M Sugrue 0–3, E O'Donovan 01.	Referee: K Murphy (Nemo Rangers)

1 November 2011 Semi-final	Mitchelstown	1–04 – 0–06	Courcey Rovers	Páirc Uí Rinn
	D Dineen 1–0, L Keane 0–1, S Beston 0–1, M Walsh 0–1, J Sheehan 0–1.		J Duggan 0–2, G Moloney 0–1, S Moloney 0–1, O Crowley 0–1, B Hayes 0–1.	Referee: D O'Leary (Watergrasshill)

=== Final ===
11 November 2011 Final	Kanturk	1–20 – 0–04	Mitchelstown	Páirc Uí Rinn
	L McLoughlin 1–4, D Duane 0–5, A Nash 0–4, A Sheehy 0–4, J McLoughlin 0–2, W Murphy 0–1.		S Beston 0–1, A O'Brien 0–1, P Donegan 0–1, S Cahill 0–1.	Referee: K Murphy (Nemo Rangers)

== Championship statistics ==
=== Top scorers ===
Top scorers overall

Rank	Player	Club	Tally	Total	Matches	Average
1	Donagh Duane	Kanturk	0–18	18	3	6.00
2	Mark Sugrue	Bandon	0–12	12	3	4.00
3	Lorcán McLoughlin	Kanturk	1–07	10	3	3.33
3	Anthony Nash	Kanturk	1–07	10	3	3.33
5	Darren Crowley	Bandon	2–03	9	2	4.50

Top scorers in a single game

Rank	Player	Club	Tally	Total	Opposition
1	Donagh Duane	Kanturk	0–10	10	Glenbower Rovers
2	Lorcán McLoughlin	Kanturk	1–04	7	Mitchelstown
3	Brian Hayes	Courcey Rovers	0–06	6	Donoughmore
3	Mark Sugrue	Bandon	0–06	6	St. Finbarr's
5	Simon Holland	Courcey Rovers	1–02	5	Donoughmore
5	Darren Crowley	Bandon	1–02	5	St. Finbarr's
5	Shane Sexton	Donoughmore	0–05	5	Courcey Rovers
5	Cian Madden	St. Finbarr's	0–05	5	Bandon
5	Donagh Duane	Kanturk	0–05	5	Mitchelstown
10	Anthony Nash	Kanturk	1–01	4	Glenbower Rovers
10	Darren Crowley	Bandon	1–01	4	Kanturk
10	Liam Keane	Mitchelstown	0–04	4	Urhan
10	Denis O'Brien	St. Finbarr's	0–04	4	Bandon
10	Anthony Nash	Kanturk	0–04	4	Mitchelstown
10	Alan Sheehy	Kanturk	0–04	4	Mitchelstown
