= 2021 Cork Intermediate A Football Championship =

- Dates: 4 September - 5 December 2021
- Teams: 16
- Sponsor: Bon Secours Hospital
- Champions: Iveleary (1st title); Brian Cronin (captain); John McNulty (manager)
- Runners-up: Mitchelstown; Pa Magee (captain); Martin O'Brien (manager)
- Relegated: Kinsale

Tournament statistics
- Matches played: 32
- Goals scored: 75 (2.34 per match)
- Points scored: 747 (23.34 per match)
- Top scorer(s): Chris Óg Jones (5-38)

The 2021 Cork Intermediate A Football Championship was the 86th staging of the Cork Intermediate A Football Championship since its establishment by the Cork County Board in 1909. The draw for the group stage placings took place on 29 April 2021. The championship began on 4 September 2021 and ended on 5 December 2021.

The final was played on 5 December 2021 at Páirc Uí Chaoimh in Cork, between Iveleary and Mitchelstown, in what was their first ever meeting in a final. Iveleary won the match by 0-20 to 0-07 to claim their first ever championship title.

Iveleary's Chris Óg Jones was the championship's top scorer with 5-38.

== Team changes ==
=== To Championship ===
Promoted from the Cork Junior A Football Championship

- Iveleary

Relegated from the Cork Premier Intermediate Football Championship

- Gabriel Rangers

=== From Championship ===
Promoted to the Cork Premier Intermediate Football Championship

- Rockchapel

Relegated to the City Junior A Football Championship

- Mayfield

== Results ==
=== Group A ===
==== Table ====
Advance to play-offs Advance to relegation play-offs

Team	Matches				Score			Pts
Team	Pld	W	D	L	For	Against	Diff	Pts
Mitchelstown	3	2	0	1	6-40	4-24	22	4
Aghabullogue	3	2	0	1	8-42	6-27	21	4
Glanmire	3	2	0	0	10-27	5-29	13	4
Kildorrery	3	0	0	3	1-21	10-50	-56	0

==== Results ====
4 September 2021 Round 1	Mitchelstown	1-11 - 3-10	Aghabullogue	Felix Sarsfield Memorial Park
	M Walsh 1-7, J O'Sullivan 0-1, S Beston 0-1, D Flynn 0-1, A O'Brien 0-1.		K O'Sullivan 2-0, D Thompson 0-6, M Bradley 1-2, L Casey 0-2.

5 September 2021 Round 1	Kildorrery	0-05 - 5-13	Glanmire	Páirc Mac Gearailt

26 September 2021 Round 2	Glanmire	1-06 - 4-12	Mitchelstown	Castlelyons GAA Grounds
	L Hackett 1-0, D Molden 0-3, E Murphy 0-1, K Murphy 0-1, M Cussen 0-1.		C O'Mahony 2-5, M Walsh 0-5, S Cahill 1-1, S Walsh 1-0, J O'Sullivan 0-1.

26 September 2021 Round 2	Aghabullogue	4-20 - 1-08	Kildorrery	Kanturk GAA Grounds

16 October 2021 Round 3	Mitchelstown	1-17 - 0-08	Kildorrery	Araglen GAA Grounds

16 October 2021 Round 3	Aghabullogue	1-12 - 4-08	Glanmire	Inniscarra GAA Grounds

=== Group B ===
==== Table ====
Advance to play-offs

Team	Matches				Score			Pts
Team	Pld	W	D	L	For	Against	Diff	Pts
Kilshannig	3	3	0	0	4-37	1-25	21	6
Glanworth	3	2	0	1	2-31	3-31	-3	4
Adrigole	3	1	0	2	1-29	2-31	-5	2
Glenville	3	0	0	3	1-26	2-36	-13	0

==== Results ====
4 September 2021 Round 1	Adrigole	0-10 - 0-09	Glenville	Sam Maguire Park

5 September 2021 Round 1	Kilshannig	2-15 - 0-05	Glanworth	The Mill Field
	B O'Shea 1-1, T Cunningham 1-1, E O'Hanlon 0-3, K Twomey 0-3, D O'Sullivan 0-3, C McMahon 0-2, B Guerin 0-1, J Kearney 0-1.		S O'Riordan 0-3, J O'Sullivan 0-1, M Sheehan 0-1.

25 September 2021 Round 2	Glenville	1-07 - 0-14	Kilshannig	The Mill Field
	J Cooke 0-4, D O'Farrell 1-0, J Carver 0-1, C Cronin 0-1, S Cahill 0-1.		C McMahon 0-5, B O'Shea 0-2, J Twomey 0-2, K Twomey 0-2, B Curtin 0-1, S Murphy 0-1, D O'Sullivan 0-1.

25 September 2021 Round 2	Glanworth	0-14 - 1-06	Adrigole	Iveleary GAA Grounds
	S O'Riordan 0-8, M Sheehan 0-4, D Pyne 0-1, P Blackburne 0-1.	Report	David Harrington 1-4, N O'Sullivan 0-1, J Harrington 0-1.

16 October 2021 Round 3	Kilshannig	2-08 - 0-13	Adrigole	Castletown GAA Grounds
	K Twomey 1-2, B O'Shea 1-1, E O'Hanlon 0-2, C O'Sullivan 0-1, D O'Sullivan 0-1, J Kearney 0-1.	Report	D Harrington 0-10, N O'Sullivan 0-2, S O'Sullivan 0-1.

16 October 2021 Round 3	Glanworth	2-12 - 0-10	Glenville	Páirc Mac Gearailt

=== Group C ===
==== Table ====
Advance to play-offs Advance to relegation play-offs

Team	Matches				Score			Pts
Team	Pld	W	D	L	For	Against	Diff	Pts
Iveleary	3	3	0	0	3-61	2-33	31	6
Millstreet	3	2	0	1	4-45	3-50	-2	4
St. Finbarr's	3	1	0	2	0-38	2-40	-8	2
Kinsale	3	0	0	3	4-30	4-51	-21	0

==== Results ====
5 September 2021 Round 1	Millstreet	1-21 - 3-11	Kinsale	Castle Grounds

5 September 2021 Round 1	St. Finbarr's	0-12 - 0-18	Iveleary	Cloughduv GAA Grounds
			C Óg Jones 0-6, C Vaughan 0-5, B Cronin 0-3.

26 September 2021 Round 2	Kinsale	0-11 - 0-12	St. Finbarr's	Páirc Liam Mhic Cárthaigh

26 September 2021 Round 2	Iveleary	0-25 - 1-13	Millstreet	Páirc Abán
	C Vaughan 0-11, C Óg Jones 0-10, C Galvin 0-2, B O'Leary 0-2.		N Flahive 0-7, C O'Leary 1-1, J Linehan 0-2, K Crowley 0-1, D Cashman 0-1, S Hickey 0-1.

16 October 2021 Round 3	Millstreet	2-11 - 0-14	St. Finbarr's	Castle Grounds

16 October 2021 Round 3	Kinsale	1-08 - 3-18	Iveleary	Valley Rovers GAA Grounds
	T Broderick 1-1, J O'Brien 0-2, G Finn 0-1, M Murphy 0-1, C McCarthy 0-1, B Coughlan 0-1, C Donnellan 0-1.		C Óg Jones 2-2, C Vaughan 1-4, I Jones 0-4, C O'Leary 0-3, B Cronin 0-1, K Manning 0-1, B O'Leary 0-1, S Lehane 0-1, L Kearney 0-1.

=== Group D ===
==== Table ====
Advance to play-offs

Team	Matches				Score			Pts
Team	Pld	W	D	L	For	Against	Diff	Pts
Dromtarriffe	3	2	0	1	7-32	4-38	3	4
Ballydesmond	3	2	0	1	3-38	3-37	1	4
Gabriel Rangers	3	1	0	2	2-32	4-28	0	2
Ballinora	3	1	0	2	5-30	6-31	-4	2

==== Results ====
5 September 2021 Round 1	Gabriel Rangers	2-13 - 1-08	Ballinora	Randal Óg GAA Grounds

5 September 2021 Round 1	Dromtarriffe	1-18 - 2-14	Ballydesmond	Cullen GAA Grounds
	E Murphy 0-5, B Murphy 1-1, C O'Callaghan 0-4, D O'Keeffe 0-3, M O'Connor 0-2, T Howard 0-2, D O'Connor 0-1.		D Moynihan 2-3, N Fleming 0-2, B Lenihan 0-2,

26 September 2021 Round 2	Ballinora	2-16 - 3-08	Dromtarriffe	Páirc Eoin Mhic Charthaigh

26 September 2021 Round 2	Ballydesmond	0-14 - 0-13	Gabriel Rangers	Páirc Cill Mhíchíl

16 October 2021 Round 3	Ballinora	2-06 - 1-10	Ballydesmond	Páirc Eoin Mhic Charthaigh

16 October 2021 Round 3	Gabriel Rangers	0-08 - 3-06	Dromtarriffe	Páirc Cill Mhíchíl

=== Relegation stage ===
==== Playoff ====
30 October 2021 Playoff	Kinsale	2-14 - 2-15 (aet)	Kildorrery	Páirc Eoin Mhic Charthaigh
	M Murphy 1-3, H Sheehan 1-1, A Gould 0-1, T Broderick 0-5, B Coughlan 0-1, J O'Brien 0-1, N McCarthy 0-1.		J O'Gorman 1-5, C Harrington 1-0, W Fouhy 0-3, K Noonan 0-2, K Hurley 0-1, P O'Brien 0-1, S Fitzgerald 0-1, J O'Sullivan 0-1, T Watson 0-1.

=== Knockout stage ===
==== Quarter-finals ====
30 October 2021 Quarter-final	Kilshannig	1-08 - 1-06	Millstreet	Fr. Kelleher Park
	T Cunningham 1-1, E O'Hanlon 0-4, K Twomey 0-3.		M Ellis 1-2, K Crowley 0-1, N Flahive 0-1, J Linehan 0-1, T Sheehan 0-1.

30 October 2021 Quarter-final	Mitchelstown	3-15 - 2-11 (aet)	Ballydesmond	Dr. Croke Park
	M Keane 1-3, D Reidy-Price 1-2, D Flynn 1-0, S Cahill 0-3, M Walsh 0-2, P Magee 0-2, J O'Sullivan 0-1, S O'Sullivan 0-1, S Beston 0-1.		Donncha O'Connor 0-6, D Moynihan 1-2, N Fleming 1-0, Donal O'Connor 0-1, J O'Keeffe 0-1, B Linehan 0-1.

30 October 2021 Quarter-final	Dromtarriffe	0-10 - 1-13	Aghabullogue	Mallow GAA Complex
	C O'Callaghan 0-3, D O'Keeffe 0-4, E Murphy 0-2.		M Bradley 0-5, I Barry-Murphy 1-0, D Thompson 0-2, J Murphy 0-1, A Murphy 0-1, B Casey 0-1, E O'Sullivan 0-1, C O'Sullivan 0-1.

31 October 2021 Quarter-final	Iveleary	5-12 - 0-12	Glanworth	Mourneabbey Grounds
	C Óg Jones 2-8, B Cronin 1-2, I Jones 1-0, A O'Donovan 1-0, C O'Leary 0-1, B O'Leary 0-1.		M Sheehan 0-4, S O'Riordan 0-2, J O'Sullivan 0-2, D Pyne 0-2, E Sheehan 0-1, P O'Driscoll 0-1.

==== Semi-finals ====
13 November 2021 Semi-final	Iveleary	3-14 - 1-05	Aghabullogue	Jack Fitzgerald Memorial Park
	C Óg Jones 1-4, C O'Leary 1-3, B Cronin 1-2, C Vaughan 0-3, B O'Leary 0-1, L O'Sullivan 0-1.		M Bradley 0-4, N Barry-Murphy 1-0, I Barry-Murphy 0-1.	Referee: M Collins (Clonakilty)

27 November 2021 Semi-final	Kilshannig	1-13 - 2-11	Mitchelstown	Kildorrery Grounds
	É O'Hanlon 1-5, T Cunningham 0-3, D O'Sullivan 0-2, B Guerin 0-1, J Twomey 0-1, J Kearney 0-1.		C O'Mahony 0-4, D Dineen 1-0, P Molloy 1-0, S Cahill 0-2, J Sheehan 0-2, S O'Sullivan 0-1, D Flynn 0-1, M Walsh 0-1.	Referee: C Dineen (Douglas)

==== Final ====
5 December 2021 Final	Iveleary	0-20 - 0-07	Mitchelstown	Páirc Uí Chaoimh
	C Óg Jones 0-8 (0-2 f), C Vaughan 0-5 (0-1 f), B O’Leary 0-3, B Cronin, J Creedon (0-1 45), I Jones, C Galvin 0-1 each.	Report	M Walsh 0-3 (0-1 f, 0-1 45), J Sheehan (f), C English, A O’Brien, D Flynn 0-1 each.	Referee: C Treacy (Nemo Rangers)
