= 1961 Cork Junior Football Championship =

- Dates: 8 October – 10 December 1961
- Teams: 8
- Champions: Mitchelstown (1st title)
- Runners-up: O'Donovan Rossa

Tournament statistics
- Matches played: 6
- Goals scored: 19 (3.17 per match)
- Points scored: 70 (11.67 per match)

The 1961 Cork Junior Football Championship was the 63rd staging of the Cork Junior A Football Championship since its establishment by Cork County Board in 1895. The championship ran from 8 October to 10 December 1961.

The final was played on 10 December 1961 at Athletic Grounds in Cork, between Mitchelstown and O'Donovan Rossa, in what was their first ever meeting in the final. Mitchelstown won the match by 2–08 to 2–04 to claim their first ever championship title.

== Qualification ==
Division	Championship	Representatives
Avondhu	North Cork Junior A Football Championship	Mitchelstown
Beara	Beara Junior A Football Championship	Adrigole
Carbery	South West Junior A Football Championship	O'Donovan Rossa
Carrigdhoun	South East Junior A Football Championship	Kinsale
Duhallow	Duhallow Junior A Football Championship	Castlemagner
Imokilly	East Cork Junior A Football Championship	Glenville
Muskerry	Mid Cork Junior A Football Championship	Canovee
Seandún	City Junior A Football Championship	St Finbarr's

== Results ==
=== Quarter-finals ===
8 October 1961 Quarter-final	Kinsale	1–07 – 0–01	Glenville	Cork Athletic Grounds

15 October 1961 Quarter-final	O'Donovan Rossa	2–06 – 1–04	Adrigole	Wolfe Tone Park

15 October 1961 Quarter-final	Mitchelstown	4–10 – 2–05	Castlemagner	Páirc Uí Shíocháin

15 October 1961 Quarter-final	St Finbarr's	1–06 – 0–06	Canovee	Ballincollig Grounds

=== Semi-finals ===
29 October 1961 Semi-final	Mitchelstown	4–10 – 0–03	Kinsale	Riverstown Sportsfield

Semi-final	O'Donovan Rossa	w/o – scr.	St Finbarr's

=== Final ===
10 December 1961 Final	Mitchelstown	2–08 – 2–04	O'Donovan Rossa	Cork Athletic Grounds

== Championship statistics ==
=== Miscellaneous ===
- The quarter-final match between St Finbarr's and Canovee was abandoned after 49 minutes.
