= Chris Óg Jones =

Irish Gaelic footballer

Personal information
- Native name: Criostóir Óg Mac Seoin (Irish)
- Born: 22/12/1998 Inchigeelagh, County Cork, Ireland
- Occupation: Performance support engineer

Sport
- Sport: Gaelic Football
- Position: Right corner-forward
Clubs*
Years	Club	Apps (scores)
2015-present 2017-present	Iveleary → Muskerry	34 (30-162); 7 (7-17)
Club titles
- Cork titles: 0
College
- Years: College
- 2018-2022: University of Limerick
College titles
- Sigerson titles: 0
Inter-county**
Years	County	Apps (scores)
2022-present	Cork	20 (5-34)
Inter-county titles
- Munster titles: 0
- All-Irelands: 0
- NFL: 0
- All Stars: 0
- * club appearances and scores correct as of 20:58, 13 October 2025. **Inter County team apps and scores correct as of 16:58, 25 April 2026.

Chris Óg Jones (born 22 December 1998) is an Irish Gaelic footballer who plays at club level with Iveleary and at inter-county level with the Cork senior football team. He usually lines out as a forward.

== Career ==
Jones first played competitive Gaelic football with the Iveleary club in Inchigeelagh and, after progressing through the juvenile and underage ranks, he soon joined the club's top adult team. He enjoyed his first major success when the club won the Cork JAFC title in 2020, with Jones ending the campaign as top scorer. This success was followed by claiming the Cork IAFC title in 2021. Jones first appeared on the inter-county scene with the Cork minor football team in 2016 before later linking up with the under-20 side. He was first selected for the Cork senior football team for the pre-season McGrath Cup competition in 2022 and later earned inclusion on the team's National League panel.

== Career statistics ==
=== Club ===
As of match played 31 October 2026.

Team	Year	Cork JAFC	
Team	Year	Apps	Score
Uíbh Laoire	2015	3	0-02
Uíbh Laoire	2016	—	
Uíbh Laoire	2017	—	
Uíbh Laoire	2018	3	2-15
Uíbh Laoire	2019	3	1-10
Uíbh Laoire	2020	3	6-17
Uíbh Laoire	Total	12	9-44
Uíbh Laoire	Year	Cork IAFC	
Uíbh Laoire	Year	Apps	Score
Uíbh Laoire	2021	6	5-38
Uíbh Laoire	Total	6	5-38
Uíbh Laoire	Year	Cork PIFC	
Uíbh Laoire	Year	Apps	Score
Uíbh Laoire	2022	3	3-10
Uíbh Laoire	2023	4	1-18
Uíbh Laoire	2024	5	6-27
Uíbh Laoire	2025	4	6-25
Uíbh Laoire	2026	5	6-33
Uíbh Laoire	Total	21	22-113
Career total		39	36-195

=== Division ===
As of match played 8 July 2025.

Team	Year	Cork PSFC	
Team	Year	Apps	Score
Muskerry	2017	2	0-01
Muskerry	2018	0	0-00
Muskerry	2019	0	0-00
Muskerry	2020	0	0-00
Muskerry	2021	1	2-02
Muskerry	2022	0	0-00
Muskerry	2023	0	0-00
Muskerry	2024	3	2-11
Muskerry	2025	1	3-03
Career total		7	7-17

=== Inter-county ===
As of 25 April 2026

Team	Year	National League			Munster		All-Ireland		Total	
Team	Year	Division	Apps	Score	Apps	Score	Apps	Score	Apps	Score
Cork	2022	Division 2	1	0-00	0	0-00	0	0-00	1	0-00
Cork	2023	Division 2	7	0-12	1	0-00	5	0-06	13	0-18
Cork	2024	Division 2	7	2-15	2	1-03	4	0-08	13	3-26
Cork	2025	Division 2	7	5-19	2	1-04	4	1-09	13	7-32
Cork	2026	Division 2	8	4-22	2	2-04	0	0-00	10	6-26
Total			30	11-68	7	4-11	13	1-23	50	16-102

== Honours ==
Iveleary

- Cork Intermediate A Football Championship: 2021
- Cork Junior A Football Championship: 2020
- Mid Cork Junior A Football Championship: 2015, 2018, 2019, 2020
