= 1977 Cork Junior Football Championship =

- Teams: 8
- Champions: Castletownbere (1st title)
- Runners-up: Rockchapel

The 1977 Cork Junior Football Championship was the 79th staging of the Cork Junior Football Championship since its establishment by Cork County Board in 1895.

The final was played on 25 November 1977 at the Castle Grounds in Macroom, between Castletownbere and Rockchapel, in what was their first ever meeting in the final. Castletownbere won the match by 3–05 to 0–08 to claim their first ever championship title.

== Results ==
=== Final ===
25 November 1977 Final	Castletownbere	3–05 – 0–08	Rockchapel	Castle Grounds
