= 1987 Cork Junior A Football Championship =

- Teams: 8
- Champions: Rockchapel (1st title)
- Runners-up: Carbery Rangers

The 1987 Cork Junior A Football Championship was the 89th staging of the Cork Junior A Football Championship since its establishment by Cork County Board in 1895.

The final was played on 29 November 1987 at the Iveleary Grounds in Inchigeelagh, between Rockchapel and Carbery Rangers, in what was their first ever meeting in the final. Rockchapel won the match by 2–05 to 1–04 to claim their first ever championship title.

== Results ==
=== Final ===
29 November 1987 Final	Rockchapel	2–05 – 1–04	Carbery Rangers	Iveleary Grounds
