= 1955 Cork Junior Football Championship =

Irish hurling competition

- Champions: Delaney Rovers (1st title)
- Runners-up: Mitchelstown

The 1955 Cork Junior Football Championship was the 57th staging of the Cork Junior Football Championship since its establishment by the Cork County Board in 1895.

The final was played on 27 November 1955 at the Athletic Grounds in Fermoy, between Delaney Rovers and Mitchelstown, in what was their first ever meeting in the final. Delaney Rovers won the match by 1–08 to 1–05 to claim their first ever championship title.

== Results ==
=== Final ===
27 November 1955 Final	Delaney Rovers	1–08 – 1–05	Mitchelstown	Fermoy Athletic Grounds
