= 1983 Cork Junior Football Championship =

Irish football sporting competition

- Teams: 8
- Champions: Donoughmore (1st title)
- Runners-up: St Nicholas'

The 1983 Cork Junior Football Championship was the 85th staging of the Cork Junior Football Championship since its establishment by Cork County Board in 1895.

The final was played on 20 November 1983 at Coachford Sportsfield, between Donoughmore and St Nicholas', in what was their first ever meeting in the final. Donoughmore won the match by 1–03 to 0–05 to claim their first ever championship title.

== Results ==
=== Final ===
| 20 November 1983 Final | Donoughmore | 1–03 – 0–05 | St Nicholas' | Coachford Sportsfield |
