= 1989 Cork Intermediate Football Championship =

Gaelic football competition

- Dates: 7 May - 8 October 1989
- Teams: 17
- Champions: Rockchapel (1st title); Joe Carroll (captain); Pat Curtin (manager)
- Runners-up: Mallow; Matt Fallon (captain); Liam Murphy (manager)

Tournament statistics
- Matches played: 18
- Goals scored: 36 (2 per match)
- Points scored: 292 (16.22 per match)
- Top scorer(s): Jerry Casey (1-19)

The 1989 Cork Intermediate Football Championship was the 54th staging of the Cork Intermediate Football Championship since its establishment by the Cork County Board in 1909. The draw for the opening round fixtures took place on 18 December 1988. The championship ran from 7 May to 8 October 1989.

The final replay was played on 8 October 1989 at Páirc Mhic Ghiobúin in Milford, between Rockchapel and Mallow, in what was their first ever final meeting. Rockchapel won the match by 0-09 to 0-04 to claim their first ever championship title.

Rockchapel's Jerry Casey was the championship's top scorer with 1-19.

== Results ==
=== First round ===
25 June 1989 First round	Castletownbere	3-10 - 4-06	Douglas	Castletown-Kinneigh Grounds
	J Power 1-2, Noel Murphy 1-2, Gary Murphy 1-1, C Collins 0-2, M O'Sullivan 0-2, B O'Driscoll 0-1.		F Bermingham 1-1, B Newton 1-1, E Forde 1-1, M O'Regan 1-0, D Larkin 0-2, P Lynch 0-1.

=== Second round ===
7 May 1989 Second round	St. Finbarr's	1-10 - 1-05	Doneraile	Felix Sarsfield Memorial Park
	S Keating 1-1, J Bergin 0-3, J Allen 0-2, E Barrett 0-1, J Crowley 0-1, J Stack 0-1, J Griffin 0-1.		J Crowley 1-1, P Harrington 0-4.

7 May 1989 Second round	Nemo Rangers	1-10 - 0-07	Mayfield	Ballinlough Grounds
	G O'Regan 1-0, E Fitzgerald 0-3, B Sheehan 0-2, D O'Sullivan 0-2, P O'Donovan 0-1, S Hayes 0-1, C Murphy 0-1.		B Huggins 0-4, S O'Donovan 0-3.

13 May 1989 Second round	Ballincollig	1-07 - 0-12	Millstreet	Páirc Eoin Mhic Chárthaigh
	T Reilly 0-5, M Mahony 1-0, C Connell 0-1, D Murphy 0-1.		E Grimes 0-4, M Taunton 0-3, A Barry 0-2, C Connell 0-1, T O'Connor 0-1, B McSweeney 0-1.

20 May 1989 Second round	Rockchapel	0-10 - 0-06	Fermoy	Fr. Con Buckley Park
	Joe Casey 0-5, Jer Casey 0-3, J Murphy 0-1, D O'Mahony 0-1.		D Pyne 0-4, B McCarthy 0-1, B O'Callaghan 0-1.

28 May 1989 Second round	Mallow	7-08 - 2-06	Midleton	Castlelyons Grounds
	J Hayes 3-2, K Mills 2-0, A Copps 1-0, R Scanlon 1-0, J Walsh 0-2, S Browne 0-2, G Buckley 0-1, D O'Donovan 0-1.		P O'Brien 1-1, K Morrison 1-0, S O'Brien 0-1, J Boylan 0-1, G Glavin 0-1, K Hennessy 0-1, C O'Neill 0-1.

10 June 1989 Second round	Macroom	2-06 - 0-06	Valley Rovers	Kilmurry Grounds
	G McPolin 1-0, N Twomey 1-0, J O'Connor 0-2, L Goold 0-2, J Nevill 0-1, N Kelleher 0-1.		D Kiely 0-3, G Slyne 0-1, J O'Donovan 0-1, A Crowley 0-1.

17 June 1989 Second round	Kilmurry	0-10 - 0-10	Naomh Abán	Kilmichael Grounds
	TJ O'Leary 0-4, T Fitzgerald 0-2, P Clifford 0-1, M Kelleher 0-1, S Kearney 0-1, M O'Mahony 0-1.		D Lynch 0-5, D Cronin 0-2, P Lucey 0-1, D McCarthy 0-1, M Healy 0-1.

1 July 1989 Second round	Castletownbere	1-11 - 1-05	Bantry Blues	Adrigole Grounds
	M O'Sullivan 0-4, N Harrington 1-0, G Murphy 0-2, J Power 0-2, O O'Sullivan 0-1, B O'Driscoll 0-1, G O'Sullivan 0-1.		P Goggin 1-0, P O'Driscoll 0-3, P Delaney 0-1, S Dineen 0-1.

2 July 1989 Second round replay	Kilmurry	2-05 - 0-16	Naomh Abán	Kilmichael Grounds
	TJ O'Leary 1-2, C Barry-Murphy 1-0, J O'Leary 0-1, JJ Buttimer 0-1, D O'Sullivan 0-1.		D Cronin 0-5, K Lynch 0-4, D Healy 0-3, P Lynch 0-3, D McCarthy 0-1.

=== Quarter-finals ===
1 July 1989 Quarter-final	Mallow	1-04 - 0-06	Millstreet	Newmarket Grounds
	J Hayes 1-0, S Browne 0-1, D O'Donovan 0-1, J Walsh 0-1, J O'Mahony 0-1.		A Barry 0-4, JW O'Leary 0-1, W O'Leary 0-1.

1 July 1989 Quarter-final	Macroom	0-07 - 0-05	St. Finbarr's	Coachford Sportsfield
	N Twomey 0-3, J Neville 0-2, S Coughlan 0-1, N Kelleher 0-1.		M Barry 0-2, B Stack 0-1, P O'Shea 0-1, T Power 0-1.

1 July 1989 Quarter-final	Rockchapel	1-09 - 0-11	Nemo Rangers	Mourneabbey Grunds
	G Casey 1-5, J Casey 0-2, D O'Mahony 0-1, J O'Mahony 0-1.		C Corkery 0-7, G O'Regan 0-2, S Hayes 0-1, J O'Callaghan 0-1.

30 July 1989 Quarter-final	Naomh Abán	1-08 - 1-06	Castletownbere	Páirc Tadhg na Samhna
	D McCarthy 1-0, D Healy 0-2, K Lynch 0-1, A Butler 0-1, M Ó Tuama 0-1, S Creedon 0-1, D Cronin 0-1, D Lynch 0-1.		O O'Sullivan 1-0, C Collins 0-2, Neil Murphy 0-1, Noel Murphy 0-1, G O'Sullivan 0-1, S Spencer 0-1.

=== Semi-finals ===
12 August 1989 Semi-final	Rockchapel	3-04 - 0-10	Naomh Abán	Dromtarriffe Grounds
	A O'Mahony 2-0, D O'Mahony 1-1, Jerry Casey 0-2, Joe Casey 0-1.		D Healy 0-2, D McCarthy 0-2, D Lynch 0-2, K Lynch 0-2, D Cronin 0-1, J Allen 0-1.

19 August 1989 Semi-final	Mallow	1-14 - 0-09	Macroom	Millstreet Grounds
	D O'Donovan 0-7, K Mills 1-3, S Browne 0-1, G Buckley 0-1, J Hayes 0-1, M Fallon 0-1.		L Gould 0-3, N Twomey 0-2, G McPolin 0-2, M Creed 0-1, S Coughlan 0-1.

=== Final ===
1 October 1989 Final	Rockchapel	1-10 - 1-10	Mallow	Páirc Mhic Ghiobúin
	Jerry Casey 0-5, D O'Mahony 1-1, Joe Casey 0-2, G O'Mahony 0-1, S Curtin 0-1.		M Fallon 1-0, J O'Mahony 0-3, P Buckley 0-2, G Buckley 0-2, S Browne 0-1, D O'Donovan 0-1, J Hayes 0-1.

8 October 1989 Final replay	Rockchapel	0-09 - 0-04	Mallow	Páirc Mhic Ghiobúin
	D O'Mahony 0-4, Jerry Casey 0-4, Joe Casey 0-1.		J O'Mahony 0-3, J Hayes 0-1.

== Championship statistics ==
=== Top scorers ===
Overall

Rank	Player	Club	Tally	Total	Matches	Average
1	Jerry Casey	Rockchapel	1-19	22	5	4.40
2	Joe Hayes	Mallow	4-05	17	5	3.40
3	Denis O'Mahony	Rockchapel	2-08	14	5	2.80
4	Kieran Mills	Mallow	3-03	12	5	2.40
5	Joe Casey	Rockchapel	0-11	11	5	2.20

In a single game

Rank	Player	Club	Tally	Total	Opposition
1	Joe Hayes	Mallow	3-02	11	Midleton
2	Jerry Casey	Rockchapel	1-05	8	Nemo Rangers
3	Colin Corkery	Nemo Rangers	0-07	7	Rockchapel
3	Denis O'Donovan	Mallow	0-07	7	Macroom
5	Kieran Mills	Mallow	2-00	6	Midleton
5	Antóin O'Mahony	Rockchapel	2-00	6	Naomh Abán
5	Kieran Mills	Mallow	1-03	6	Macroom
8	Joe Power	Castletownbere	1-02	5	Douglas
8	Noel Murphy	Castletownbere	1-02	5	Douglas
8	T. J. O'Leary	Kilmurry	1-02	5	Naomh Abán
8	Tadhg O'Reilly	Ballincollig	0-05	5	Millstreet
8	Joe Casey	Rockchapel	0-05	5	Fermoy
8	Diarmuid Lynch	Naomh Abán	0-05	5	Kilmurry
8	Donal Cronin	Naomh Abán	0-05	5	Kilmurry
8	Jerry Casey	Rockchapel	0-05	5	Mallow
