= 1959 Cork Junior Football Championship =

Irish hurling competition

- Champions: Dromtarriffe (3rd title)
- Runners-up: Dohenys

The 1959 Cork Junior Football Championship was the 61st staging of the Cork Junior Football Championship since its establishment by the Cork County Board in 1895.

The final was played on 8 November 1959 at Bishop MacEgan Park in Macroom, between Dromtarriffe and Dohenys, in what was their first ever meeting in the final. Dromtarriffe won the match by 5–01 to 3–01 to claim their third championship title overall and a first championship title in 21 years.

== Results ==
=== Final ===
8 November 1959 Final	Dromtarriffe	5–01 – 3–01	Dohenys	Bishop MacEgan Park
