= 2016 Cork Junior A Football Championship =

118th staging of the Cork Junior A Football Championship

- Teams: 8
- Sponsor: Evening Echo
- Champions: Gabriel Rangers (1st title); Mark Cronin (captain); Mike O'Brien (manager)
- Runners-up: Shamrocks

The 2016 Cork Junior A Football Championship was the 118th staging of the Cork Junior A Football Championship since its establishment by the Cork County Board. The draw for the opening round fixtures took place on 13 December 2015.

The final was played on 23 October 2016 at Páirc Uí Rinn in Cork, between Gabriel Rangers and Shamrocks, in what was their first ever meeting in the final. Gabriel Rangers won the match by 2–13 to 2–07 to claim their first ever championship.

== Results ==
=== Final ===
23 October 2016 Final	Gabriel Rangers	2–13 – 2–07	Shamrocks	Páirc Uí Rinn
	E Goggin and C Moynihan (1–3 each), M Cronin (0–3, 0–1 free), S Kelleher (0–2), S O’Mahony and G O’Callaghan (0–1 each).		A McCarthy and A O’Grady (1–0 each), J Shanahan (0–2), B Mulqueen, M Jordan, D O’Sullivan, P Brady and C Caffery (0–1 each).	Referee: C Murphy (Brian Dillons)
