= Goleen GAA =

Gaelic games club

- CLG An Góilín
- Founded: 1950s
- County: Cork
- Colours: Yellow and Black

Playing kits
Standard colours

Goleen GAA is a Gaelic Athletic Association based in the parish of Goleen, in County Cork, Ireland. The club plays Gaelic football only, and participates in competitions organised by Cork county board and Carbery divisional board. Traditionally, the club has operated at Junior B level, the second lowest level possible in Cork. In 2016, the club won the Cork Junior C Football Championship. The club uses the name Dunmanus Rovers for juvenile teams as in 2018 they joined neighbouring club Muintir Bhaire to try to field teams. The club's colours are black and amber.

== Achievements ==
- Cork Junior C Football Championship (1): 2016
- Cork Junior B Football Championship (1) (2024) : (runner-up 2019, 2021)
- West Cork Junior B Football League (2): 1993, 2010
- West Cork Junior B Football Championship (5) : 1959, 2011, 2019, 2023, 2024
- West Cork Under-21 C Football Championship (1): 1999
