= Damien Gore =

Irish Gaelic footballer

Personal information
- Native name: Damien de Gaor (Irish)
- Born: 1999 (age 26–27) Cork, Ireland
- Occupation: Student

Sport
- Sport: Gaelic Football
- Position: Left corner-forward
Club
- Years: Club
- Kilmacabea
Club titles
- Cork titles: 0
College
- Years: College
- 2018-present: Cork Institute of Technology
College titles
- Sigerson titles: 0
Inter-county
Years	County	Apps (scores)
2019-present	Cork	0 (0-00)
Inter-county titles
- Munster titles: 0
- All-Irelands: 0
- NFL: 0
- All Stars: 0

Damien Gore (born 1999) is an Irish Gaelic footballer who plays for West Cork Junior Championship club Kilmacabea and at inter-county level with the Cork senior football team. He usually lines out as a left corner-forward.

== Honours ==
Cork Institute of Technology

- Trench Cup (1): 2020

Kilmacabea

- South West Junior A Football Championship (4): 2017, 2018, 2020, 2024

Cork

- National Football League Division 3 (1): 2020
- All-Ireland Under-20 Football Championship (1): 2019
- Munster Under-20 Football Championship (1): 2019
