= White's Cross GAA =

Gaelic games club in County Cork, Ireland

White's Cross
- Crosaire an Fhaoitigh
- Founded: 1957
- County: Cork
- Colours: Green and White

Playing kits
Standard colours

White's Cross GAA (Irish: Cumann Luthchleas Gael Crosaire an Fhaoitigh) is a Gaelic Athletic Association club based to the north of Cork, Ireland. Its playing field is located at Ballinvriskig. Teams are fielded in Gaelic football and hurling. The club participates in Cork GAA competitions and in Seandún board competitions. They contest both hurling and football at Junior A level.

== History ==
The club was founded in 1957 and won their first trophy seven years later, the East Cork JHL.

== Achievements ==
- Cork Junior Football Championship Runner-Up 2010
- Cork Junior B Hurling Championship Runner-Up 1991, 2017, winners 2018.
- Cork City Junior Football Championship Winners (4) 2006, 2008, 2009, 2010 | Runner-Up 2005
- City Junior Football League Winners (5) 1994, 2001, 2006, 2009, 2010
- City Junior B Football Championship Winners (1) 1991
- City Junior B Hurling Championship Winners (2) 1991, 2016
- City Junior B Football League Winners (2) 1992, 2021
- City Junior B Hurling League Winners (2) 1991, 1999
- MacCurtain Cup Winners (1) 1992
- Seandun Cup Winners (2) 1981, 1991
- McSwiney Cup Winners (10) 2003, 2004, 2005, 2006, 2007, 2008, 2009, 2010, 2011, 2012
- Craobh Rua Cup Winners (3) 1991, 1998 2016
- City Minor A Football Championship Winners (3) 1988, 1990, 1992
- City Minor B Football Championship Winners (2) 2002, 2006
- East Junior Hurling League Winners (1) 1964
- East Junior B Hurling Championship Winners (1) 1982
- East Under 21 "B" Hurling Championship Winners (1) 1977
