= Uíbh Laoire GAA =

Gaelic Athletic Association club

Uíbh Laoire
- Uíbh Laoire
- Founded: 1884
- County: Cork
- Colours
- Grounds: Uíbh Laoire GAA Grounds

Playing kits
Standard colours

Senior Club Championships
	All Ireland	Munster champions	Cork champions
Football:	0	0	0
Hurling:	0	0	0

Uíbh Laoire GAA is a Gaelic Athletic Association club located in the village of Inchigeelagh, County Cork, Ireland. The club fields teams in both hurling and Gaelic football.

== History ==
Located in the village of Inchigeelagh, about 10 miles from Macroom, Uíbh Laoire GAA Club was founded in 1884. The club has spent the majority of its existence operating in the junior grade. Uíbh Laoire won their first Mid Cork JAFC in 1929, the first of four such titles between then and 1941. Further divisional JAFC titles were added in 1958 and 1985.

After a 30-year hiatus, Uíbh Laoire claimed their next Mid Cork JAFC title in 2015. This began a very successful era, which yielded four Mid Cork titles in a six-season period between 2015 and 2020. The last of these titles was subsequently converted into a Cork JAFC title, following a 3–11 to 1–06 win over Boherbue in the final. Uíbh Laoire secured a second successive promotion in 2021, when the club won the Cork IAFC title.

== Honours ==
- Cork Premier Intermediate Football Championship (1): 2026
- Cork Intermediate A Football Championship (1): 2021
- Cork Junior A Football Championship (1): 2020
- Mid Cork Junior A Football Championship (10): 1929, 1932, 1935, 1941, 1958, 1985, 2015, 2018, 2019, 2020
- Cork Under-21 Football County Championship (1): 2012

== Notable players ==
- Chris Óg Jones
- Cathal Vaughan
