= Glenbower Rovers GAA =

Gaelic games club in County Cork, Ireland

Glenbower Rovers
- Fánaithe an Ghleanna Bhodhair
- County: Cork
- Colours: Green and white
- Grounds: Killeagh
- Coordinates: 51°56′23.29″N 8°00′07.52″W

Playing kits
Standard colours

Senior Club Championships
	All Ireland	Munster champions	Cork champions
Football:	0	0	0

Glenbower Rovers GAA is a Gaelic Athletic Association club located in Killeagh, County Cork, Ireland. The club is concerned with the game of Gaelic football and is a sister club of Killeagh GAA.

== Honours ==
- East Cork Junior A Football Championship (4): 2011, 2012, 2013, 2014

== Notable players ==
- Joe Deane
- Séamus Harnedy
