= Rockchapel GAA =

Gaelic games club in County Cork, Ireland

Rockchapel
- Séipéal na Carraige
- Founded: 1934
- County: Cork
- Nickname: The Rock
- Colours: Maroon and white
- Grounds: Stagmount

Playing kits
Standard colours

Rockchapel GAA is a Gaelic Athletic Association club based in the village of Rockchapel in the North West of County Cork, Ireland which forms part of the parish of Rockchapel and Meelin. The village is located close to border with County Kerry and County Limerick. The club plays Gaelic Football in the Duhallow division competitions. Ladies' Gaelic football is also played within the club. Rockchapel juvenile footballers play with St. Peter's which is an amalgamation of Meelin, Freemount and Rockchapel clubs at juvenile level. They last won the Duhallow Football Championship in 2012 and won the Cork County Junior Football Championship later that year.

== Football ==
=== Early years ===
Gaelic football began in a townland called Rockchapel in the 1920s. Games were organised between Rockchapel, Meelin, Brosna and Mountcollins as there was no structure or board in place at that time. 21 years after the Duhallow Board was first formed, Rockchapel had its first victory when they defeated Kilbrin in the novice final in 1954 which was played in Banteer. Playing in the junior ranks from 1955 to 1957 brought no success, so the club re-graded to Novice in 1958. The following year, the novice championship was won for the second time, defeating Castlemagner in the final.

=== 1960s ===
After competing in the junior grade in 1960 and 1961, the club again re-graded to Novice in 1962. Rockchapel lost in the Novice finals from 1962 to 1965 inclusive. There was some compensation when the Novice Football League was won in 1964 and 1965. Of the team which beat Ballydesmond by 2–7 to 0–3 in the 1965 decider, there were three priests in the defence, namely Fr. Finbarr Kelleher at left corner back, Fr. Tom Murphy centre back and Fr. Padraig Keogh at left half back. Rockchapel also won the Novice Football League of 1967 but the final was not played until May 1968 because of an outbreak of foot and mouth disease. In the final Rockchapel defeated Lyre 2–6 to 1–5.

=== 1970s ===
After losing the 1970 Novice Football League final to Banshee Rovers by 2–12 to 1–6, Rockchapel bounced back in the Novice Championship. Ballydaly were defeated by 2–6 to 2–2 in the semi-final, to set up a meeting with Lyre in the final after drawing 6 points each on the first occasion both teams returned to Banteer and Rockchapel won by 1–5 to 1–2. Since 1971, the club has been contesting the Junior Football Championship and after waiting five years the Junior Football Championship was won for the first time ever. After defeating Newmarket in the first round, Knocknagree were defeated by 1–12 to 0–2 and Kiskeam in the semi-final by 1–8 to 1–5. In the final, which was played in Kiskeam on the first Sunday of October, Rockchapel won by 2–7 to 2–5 against Ballydesmond. In 1977, Knocknagree defeated Rockchapel in the Examiner Cup final by 1–10 to 0–4. In defending the Junior Football Championship, they defeated Newmarket in the first round and Dromtariffe in the semi-final. In the final, played in Newmarket, they defeated Knocknagree by 1–7 to 0–2. In the county Championship they were victorious over Brian Dillon's in the first round by 0–9 to 1–5. In the semi-final at Buttevant, the North Cork Champions Grange were defeated by 1–7 to 1–4. The club's first County Final appearance was against Castletownbere which Rockchapel lost by 3–5 to 0–8 in Macroom.

=== 1980s and early 1990s ===
In 1985, the Junior Championship was won when Kiskeam were defeated in the final played in Boherbue. This was followed with victory in the 1986 Examiner Cup final when we defeated Kanturk 1–12 to 1–7. After victories over Boherbue, Newmarket and Kiskeam in the Championship, Rockchapel qualified for the final against Kanturk which was played in Dromtariffe on 27 September. Rockchapel scored 2–6 to 1–8 to win the Duhallow title for the fifth time in their history. In the County Championship they defeated Kilmichael and Urhan before Rockchapel came to face Carbery Rangers in the County Junior Football final played in Inchigeela on 29 November. After a close match, Rockchapel were victorious 2–9 to 1–4. In 1988, their first year in the Intermediate football championship, they reached the semi-final of the league and were defeated by the eventual champions Kilshannig in the semi-final of the championship. In 1989 the club won the Intermediate Football Championship and League finals. On winning the Intermediate Football Championship, the club defeated Fermoy by 3 points at Buttevant, Nemo Rangers by a point at Mourneabbey and accounted for Naomh Abán by 3 points in Dromtariffe at the semi-final and Mallow after a replay in the final. In 1990, the team competed in the Senior ranks, losing to Carrigdhoun. The club re-graded to intermediate in 1991 and re-graded to Junior grade in 1993.

=== Mid 1990s and 2000s ===
In 1996, Rockchapel won the Examiner Cup and the club's next big success was the Duhallow Junior football championship in 2001 defeating Boherbue in the final. The same year Rockchapel were knocked out of the County Championship at the quarter-final stage by Imokilly Champions Cloyne.

Rockchapel have won the Duhallow Junior A Football Championship seven times in total. Rockchapel lost the 2009 and 2011 Duhallow Junior A Football Championship finals to Kanturk. They last won this competition in 2012, defeating Millstreet in the final.

=== Junior County Champions 2012 ===
Rockchapel won the Cork Junior Football Championship in 2012, defeating Kilmurry GAA after a replay in the County Final at Páirc Uí Rinn. The path to the county final saw wins against Tadhg McCarthaigh's GAA, of Caheragh West Cork, in the quarter-final and against Glenbower Rovers Killeagh (East Cork) in the semi-final. After winning the county, 'the Rock' represented Cork in Munster losing out to Kenmare Shamrocks of Kerry in the Munster Semi-final.

=== Intermediate ===
2013 saw Rockchapel back competing at the Intermediate grade after winning the Junior County in 2012. A first round loss to Fermoy was followed up by Victories over Glanmire, Cloyne and Éire Óg to set up a semi-final meeting with Grenagh. 'The Rock' lost the semi-final to eventual champions Grenagh.

2014 saw the club reach the Intermediate County final losing out to Éire Og. They reached the final with wins over Mayfield, Kinsale and Cill na Martra. However, in 2015, the team exited the championship after a second-round defeat at the hands of Mayfield after a victory over Youghal in the first round.

In the 2016 campaign, Rockchapel lost the county final to Bandon. After a start that saw Rockchapel lead 1–4 to 0–4 at half time, Bandon gained a foothold in the second half and scored the decisive goal with 10 minutes to go. The game ended on a scoreline of 1–10 to 1–7 in favour of Bandon. Rockchapel's path to the final saw victories over Youghal, Glanworth, Aghabullogue and Millstreet.

== Ladies football ==
The Rockchapel ladies team won the All-Ireland ladies Junior club final in 1999, beating St.Nathy's from Sligo in Lusmagh, County Offaly. The ladies footballers won the All-Ireland ladies Intermediate club final in 2000, beating Confey from Kildare at Semple Stadium, Thurles. The club folded and was revived again in the mid-2000s as St. Peter's Ladies at the Junior B grade in Cork. In 2015 the Ladies won the Cork Junior B County League and Championship

== Honours ==
- Cork Intermediate Football Championship (2): 1989, 2020 (runners-up in 2016 and 2014)
- Cork Junior Football Championship (2): 1987, 2012
- Duhallow Junior A Football Championship (7): 1976, 1977, 1980, 1985, 1987, 2001, 2012
- Duhallow Junior B Football Championship (6): 1954, 1959, 1970, 2003, 2010, 2011
