= Donoughmore GAA =

Gaelic games club in County Cork, Ireland

- Cumann Luth Chleas Gael Domhnach Mór
- Founded: 1884
- County: Cork
- Colours
- Grounds: Páirc Eoin Mhic Charthaigh
- Coordinates: 51°59′25″N 8°43′48″W

Playing kits
Standard colours

Senior Club Championships
	All Ireland	Munster champions	Cork champions
Ladies' football:	2	8	13

Donoughmore GAA is a Gaelic Athletic Association club, based in the parish of Donoughmore, located in County Cork, Ireland. The club fields both Gaelic football and hurling teams. It is a member of the Muskerry division of Cork GAA.

== History ==
The club was founded in 1884. The club's home is Páirc Eoin Mhic Charthaigh Lackabawn. The symbol of the club is the arm of St. Lachteen.

The club's men's Gaelic football teams have won several titles, including the Cork Junior A Football Championship in 1983.

Donoughmore's Ladies' Gaelic football teams have had more success, including an "unmatched 11-in-a-row of Cork senior titles", with 13 titles in total from 1996 to 2011. The Ladies' teams have also won eight Munster titles and two All-Ireland Ladies' Club Football Championships.

== Honours ==
- Cork Junior A Football Championship (1): 1983
- Cork Premier 2 Minor Football Championship (2): 2024, 2025
- Cork Minor B Football Championship (1): 2007
- Cork Minor C Football Championship (1): 2006
- Cork Minor B Hurling Championship (0): (runner-up in 1993)
- Mid Cork Under-21 C Football Championship (1): 2018
- Cork Under-21 C Football Championship (1): 2018
- Mid Cork Junior A Football Championship (5): 1952, 1983, 1998, 2011, 2025
- Mid Cork Junior A Hurling Championship (1): 2026 (runner-up in 1933, 1935, 1943, 1952, 2001, 2008, 2013)
- All-Ireland Ladies' Club Football Championship (2): 2001, 2003
- Cork Ladies' Senior Football Championship (13): 1996, 1997, 1998, 1999, 2000, 2001, 2002, 2003, 2004, 2005, 2006, 2009, 2011

== Notable players ==
- Bob Honohan
- Rena Buckley
- Juliet Murphy
- Mary O'Connor
