= East Cork Junior A Football Championship =

- Code: Gaelic Football
- Founded: 1927; 99 years ago
- Region: Imokilly (GAA)
- Trophy: Jim Ryan Cup
- No. of teams: 12
- Title holders: Carrignavar (3rd title)
- Most titles: Glanmire (20 titles)
- Sponsors: Michael O'Connor Motor Factors

The East Cork Junior A Football Championship (known for sponsorship reasons as the Michael O'Connor Motor Factors East Cork Junior A Football Championship) is an annual Gaelic football competition organised by the Imokilly Board of the Gaelic Athletic Association since 1927 for junior Gaelic football teams in East Cork.

The series of games begin in March, with the championship culminating with the final in the autumn. The championship includes a group stage and a knockout stage which guarantees at least 3 championship matches.

The East Cork Junior A Championship is an integral part of the wider Cork Junior A Football Championship. The winners of the East Cork championship join their counterparts from the other seven divisions to contest the county championship.

As of 2026, 12 clubs were participating in the East Cork Championship. The title has been won at least once by 17 different clubs. The all-time record-holders are Glanmire, who have won a total of 20 titles.

Carrignavar are the title-holders, defeating Youghal by 0–16 to 1–09 in the 2026 championship final.

== Format ==
=== Group stage ===
The 12 teams are divided into three groups of four. Over the course of the group stage, each team plays once against the others in the group, resulting in each team being guaranteed at least three games. Two points are awarded for a win, one for a draw and zero for a loss. The teams are ranked in the group stage table by points gained, then scoring difference and then their head-to-head record. The top two teams in each group qualify for the knockout stage.

=== Knockout stage ===
Quarter-finals: Two lone quarter-finals featuring the four lowest-placed qualifying teams from the group stage. Two teams qualify for the next round.

Semi-finals: The two quarter-final winners and the top two highest-placed qualifying teams from the group stage contest this round. The two winners from these games advance to the final.

Final: The two semi-final winners contest the final. The winning team are declared champions.

=== Promotion and relegation ===
At the end of the championship, the winning team enters the Cork Junior A Football Championship. The winner of this is automatically promoted to the Cork Premier Junior Football Championship for the following season. The two worst-ranked teams from the group stage take part in a playoff, with the losing team being relegated to the East Cork Junior B Football Championship.

== Teams ==
=== 2026 teams ===
The 12 teams competing in the 2026 East Cork Junior A Football Championship are:

Club	Location	Colours	Position in 2026	In championship since	Championship titles	Last championship title
Aghada	Aghada	Green and white	Group stage	?	4	1989
Carrignavar	Carrignavar	Green and red	Champions	?	3	2026
Carrigtwohill	Carrigtwohill	Blue and yellow	Quarter-finals	?	3	2000
Castlemartyr	Castlemartyr	Red and white	Semi-finals	?	7	2024
Cloyne	Cloyne	Red and black	Group stage	2015	6	2016
Dungourney	Dungourney	Green and gold	Quarter-finals	2024	0	—
Erin's Own	Caherlag	Red and blue	Group stage	?	6	2019
Fr. O'Neill's	Ballymacoda	Red and green	Group stage	2023	4	2015
Lisgoold	Lisgoold	Blue and yellow	Group stage	?	1	2023
Midleton	Midleton	Black and white	Semi-finals	?	12	2020
St Catherine's	Ballynoe	Purple and yellow	Group stage	2026	0	—
Youghal	Youghal	Maroon, white and yellow	Runners-up	2020	7	1999

== List of finals ==
=== List of East Cork JAFC finals ===
Year	Winners		Runners-up		#
Year	Club	Score	Club	Score	#
2026	Carrignavar	0–16	Youghal	1–09	
2025	Carrignavar	3–12	Erin's Own	1–08	
2024	Castlemartyr	1–10	Carrigtwohill	0–12	
2023	Lisgoold	2–09	Carrignavar	0–10	
2022	Cobh	4–11	Castlemartyr	2–09	
2021	Bride Rovers	3–09	Cobh	0–10	
2020	Midleton		Carrigtwohill		
2019	Erin's Own		Cobh		
2018	Midleton		Fr. O'Neill's		
2017	Erin's Own		Glenbower Rovers		
2016	Cloyne		Castlelyons		
2015	Fr. O'Neill's		Erin's Own		
2014	Glenbower Rovers		Carrigtwohill		
2013	Glenbower Rovers		Lisgoold		
2012	Glenbower Rovers		Fr. O'Neill's		
2011	Glenbower Rovers		Lisgoold		
2010	Cloyne		Erin's Own		
2009	Cloyne		Glenbower Rovers		
2008	Cloyne		Carrignavar		
2007	Bride Rovers		Carrigtwohill		
2006	Fr. O'Neill's		Bride Rovers		
2005	Erin's Own		Cobh		
2004	Bride Rovers		Fr. O'Neill's		
2003	Erin's Own		Bride Rovers		
2002	Erin's Own		Bride Rovers		
2001	Cloyne		Erin's Own		
2000	Carrigtwohill		Fr. O'Neill's		
1999	Youghal		Erin's Own		
1998	Fr. O'Neill's		Cobh		
1997	Carrigtwohill		Glenbower Rovers		
1996	Fr. O'Neill's		Youghal		
1995	Glenville		Aghada		
1994	Erin's Own		Glenville		
1993	Carrigtwohill		Erin's Own		
1992	Midleton		Carrigtwohill		
1991	Castlemartyr		St Catherine’s		
1990	Castlemartyr		Erin's Own		
1989	Aghada		Carrigtwohill		
1988	Cobh		Youghal		
1987	Castlemartyr		Aghada		
1986	Castlemartyr		Cobh		
1985	Castlemartyr		Glenville		
1984	Youghal		Glenville		
1983	Aghada		Glenville		
1982	Castlemartyr		Glenville		
1981	Aghada		Youghal		
1980	Aghada		Cloyne		
1979	Glenville		Youghal		
1978	Glenville		Youghal		
1977	Glanmire		Aghada		
1976	Cloyne		Youghal		
1975	Carrignavar		Glenville		
1974	Midleton		Glenville		
1973	Glenville		Midleton		
1972	Glenville		Glanmire		
1971	Glanmire		Glenville		
1970	Glanmire		Midleton		
1969	Midleton		Castlelyons		
1968	Glanmire		Midleton		
1967	Midleton		Glenbower Rovers		
1966	Glanmire		Midleton		
1965	Glanmire		Glenville		
1964	Glanmire		Midleton		
1963	Glanmire		Midleton		
1962	Midleton		Glanmire		
1961	Glenville		Youghal		
1960	Cobh		Glanmire		
1959	Youghal		Glanmire		
1958	Glanmire		Cobh		
1957	Glanmire		Midleton		
1956	Cobh		Youghal		
1955	Cobh		Youghal		
1954	Cobh		Youghal		
1953	Cobh		Youghal		
1952	Youghal		Russell Rovers		
1951	Glanmire		Youghal		
1950	Glanmire		Midleton		
1949	Midleton		Glanmire		
1948	Glenville		Youghal		
1947	Cobh		Russell Rovers		
1946	Glanmire		Russell Rovers		
1945	Youghal		Glenville		
1944	Cobh		Midleton		
1943	19th Battalion				
1942	Combined Services		Youghal		
1941	Youghal		Cobh		
1940	Youghal		Cobh		
1939	Midleton		Sarsfields		
1938	Midleton		Carrignavar		
1937	Sarsfields		Midleton		
1936	Sarsfields		Midleton		
1935	Midleton				
1934	Sarsfields		Russell Rovers		
1933	Sarsfields		Castlemartyr		
1932	Sarsfields		Castlemartyr		
1931	Russell Rovers		Carrigtwohill		
1930	Sarsfields		Leeside		
1929	Sarsfields		Midleton		
1928	Midleton		Cobh		
1927	Cobh				

== Roll of honour ==
=== By club ===
#	Club	Titles	Championship wins
1	Glanmire	20	1929, 1930, 1932, 1933, 1934, 1936, 1937, 1946, 1950, 1951, 1957, 1958, 1963, 1964, 1965, 1966, 1968, 1970, 1971, 1977
2	Midleton	12	1928, 1935, 1938, 1939, 1949, 1962, 1967, 1969, 1974, 1992, 2018, 2020
3	Cobh	10	1927, 1944, 1947, 1953, 1954, 1955, 1956, 1960, 1988, 2022
4	Youghal	7	1940, 1941, 1945, 1952, 1959, 1984, 1999
4	Glenville	7	1948, 1961, 1972, 1973, 1978, 1979, 1995
4	Castlemartyr	7	1982, 1985, 1986, 1987, 1990, 1991, 2024
7	Cloyne	6	1976, 2001, 2008, 2009, 2010, 2016
7	Erin's Own	6	1994, 2002, 2003, 2005, 2017, 2019
9	Aghada	4	1980, 1981, 1983, 1989
9	Glenbower Rovers	4	2011, 2012, 2013, 2014
9	Fr O'Neill's	4	1996, 1998, 2006, 2015
12	Carrigtwohill	3	1993, 1997, 2000
12	Bride Rovers	3	2004, 2007, 2021
12	Carrignavar	3	1975, 2025, 2026
15	Russell Rovers	1	1931
15	Combined Services	1	1942
15	19th Battalion	1	1943
15	Lisgoold	1	2023

== See also ==
- East Cork Junior A Hurling Championship
