= Mitchelstown GAA =

GAA club in Cork, Ireland

- CLG Baile Mhistéala
- Founded: 1887
- County: Cork
- Nickname: Hawthorns
- Colours
- Grounds: O'Connell Park

Playing kits
Standard colours

Mitchelstown GAA is a Gaelic Athletic Association based in the town of Mitchelstown, County Cork, Ireland. The club fields teams in competitions organized by the Cork GAA county board and the Avondhu GAA divisional board. The club plays only Gaelic football.

== History ==
In 1887 the first G.A.A. club was formed in Mitchelstown under the name of the Blackthorns. Early in the nineteen hundreds the name was changed to the Kangaroos. The club did not meet with much success until it won the Cork Intermediate Football Championship in 1929. In the 1930s, 40s and 50s Mitchelstown won many North Cork Championships but never succeeded in winning a County Championship until 1961 when Mitchelstown, by which name the club was then known, won the Cork Junior Football Championship the same year for the first time. Mitchelstown also won the Cork Intermediate Football Championship in 1965. On 10 November 2013 Mitchelstown defeated St Colum's of Kealkill to win their first Cork County JAFC title in 52 years at Páirc Uí Rinn with a scoreline of 0-12 to 2-4.

== Achievements ==
- Cork Intermediate Football Championship Winners (4) 1911, 1925, 1929, 1965
- Cork Junior Football Championship Winners (2) 1961, 2013 Runners-Up 1928, 1955, 1957, 1958, 1960, 1973, 2011
- Cork Minor Football Championship Winners (1) 1960 Runners-Up 1959, 1961, 1975, 1976, 2016
- North Cork Junior A Football Championship Winners (24) 1928, 1934, 1935, 1937, 1939, 1940, 1943, 1944, 1947, 1948, 1951, 1955, 1956, 1957, 1958, 1960, 1961, 1969, 1972, 1973, 1975, 1995, 2001, 2002, 2010, 2011, 2013 Runners-Up 1930, 1931, 1953, 1988, 1991, 2000, 2003, 2012
