= Cork Junior A Football Championship =

Annual Irish Gaelic football competition

- Current season or competition: 2026 Cork Junior A Football Championship
- Irish: Craobh Peile Shóisearach A Chorcaí
- Code: Gaelic football
- Founded: 1895; 131 years ago
- Region: Cork (GAA)
- Trophy: Donal O'Sullivan Cup
- No. of teams: 7 (county championship); 75 (total)
- Title holders: Kilmacabea (1st title)
- Most titles: Nils (7 titles)
- Sponsors: McCarthy Insurance
- Official website: Cork GAA

The Cork Junior A Football Championship (known for sponsorship reasons as the Bon Secours Cork Junior A Football Championship and abbreviated to the Cork JAFC) is an annual Gaelic football competition organised by the Cork County Board of the Gaelic Athletic Association and contested by the top-ranking junior clubs in the county of Cork in Ireland. It is the sixth tier overall in the entire Cork football championship system.

The Cork Junior Championship was introduced in 1895 as a countywide competition for teams deemed not eligible for the senior grade or second-string senior teams. At the time of its creation it was the second tier of Cork football.

In its current format, the Cork Junior A Championship begins in September following the completion of the seven Divisional Junior Championships. The 7 participating teams compete in a single-elimination tournament which culminates with the final match at Páirc Uí Rinn in October or November. The winner of the Cork Junior A Championship, as well as being presented with the Donal O'Sullivan Cup, is promoted to the Cork Premier Junior Football Championship for the following season.

The competition has been won by 66 teams, 29 of which have won it more than once. Nils are the most successful team in the tournament's history, having won it 7 times. Kilmacabea are the title holders, defeating Donoughmore by 1–14 to 1–07 in the 2025 final.

== History ==
Established in 1895 as a championship for the second teams of clubs playing in the Cork Senior Championship, the junior championship was initially played on a countywide basis. With the creation of the Cork Intermediate Championship in 1909, victorious clubs in the junior grade were gained promotion to the intermediate grade.

As more and more clubs were founded, the decision was taken in 1926 to organise the junior championship on a divisional basis. Each of the eight divisions provided their championship-winning team to represent their division in the county championship.

After the intermediate grade was disbanded in 1939, the winners of the Cork Junior Championship gained promotion to the Cork Senior Championship. This system of promotion and relegation lasted until 1964 when the intermediate grade was reintroduced.

In 2017 the eight divisional runners-up were also allowed to field teams in the junior championship.

== Sponsorship ==
Since 2005 the Junior Championship has been sponsored by the Evening Echo. The championship was previously sponsored by Permanent TSB.

== Trophy ==
The winning team is presented with the Donal O'Sullivan Cup. Donal O'Sullivan played club football with Lees, before winning back-to-back Munster medals in 1956 and 1957 with the Cork senior team. He later served in a number of administrative roles, including vice-chairman and chairman of the Cork County Board and chairman of the Munster Council.

== Teams ==
=== Qualification ===
Division	Championship	Qualifying teams
Avondhu	North Cork Junior A Football Championship	Champions
Beara	Beara Junior A Football Championship	Champions
Carbery	Carbery Junior A Football Championship	Champions
Carrigdhoun	South East Junior A Football Championship	Champions
Duhallow	Duhallow Junior A Football Championship	Champions
Imokilly	East Cork Junior A Football Championship	Champions
Muskerry	Mid Cork Junior A Football Championship	Champions
Seandún	Cork City Junior A Football Championship	Champions

=== 2026 Teams ===
73 clubs will compete in the 2026 Cork Junior A Football Championship: seven teams from Duhallow, nine teams from Avondhu, twelve from Muskerry, sixteen teams from Carbery, ten teams from Seandún, seven teams from Carrigdhoun and twelve teams from Imokilly.

Club	Location	Division	Colours	Divisional Titles	Last Divisional Title	Championship Titles	Last Championship Title
Aghada	Aghada	Imokilly	Green and white	4	1989	1	1989
Aghinagh	Rusheen	Muskerry	Blue and white	2	2026	0	—
Argideen Rangers	Timoleague	Carbery	Maroon and white	1	1994	0	—
Ballinascarthy	Ballinascarthy	Carbery	Red and white	2	1983	0	—
Ballincollig	Ballincollig	Muskerry	Green and white	13	1981	3	1981
Ballinhassig	Ballinhassig	Carrigdhoun	Blue and white	4	2021	0	—
Ballinora	Ballinora	Muskerry	Green and red	3	1997	1	1997
Ballyclough	Ballyclough	Avondhu	Green and yellow	5	2016	0	—
Ballydesmond	Ballydesmond	Duhallow	Blue and gold	4	2007	0	—
Ballygarvan	Ballygarvan	Carrigdhoun	Red and white	8	2025	0	—
Ballyhooly	Ballyhooly	Avondhu	Blue and yellow	0	—	0	—
Ballymartle	Riverstick	Carrigdhoun	Green and gold	1	2018	0	—
Barryroe	Barryroe	Carbery	Blue and navy	2	2026	0	—
Béal Átha'n Ghaorthaidh	Ballingeary	Muskerry	Red and black	4	2005	0	—
Bishopstown	Bishopstown	Seandún	Maroon and white	2	1992	0	—
Carbery Rangers	Rosscarbery	Carbery	Green, white and gold	10	2003	1	2003
Carrignavar	Carrignavar	Imokilly	Green and red	3	2026	0	—
Carrigaline	Carrigaline	Carrigdhoun	Blue and yellow	14	2026	0	—
Carrigtwohill	Carrigtwohill	Imokilly	Blue and yellow	3	2000	0	—
Castlehaven	Castlehaven	Carbery	Blue and white	2	1976	1	1976
Castlemagner	Castlemagner	Duhallow	Black and amber	10	2026	2	1952
Castlemartyr	Castlemartyr	Imokilly	Red and white	7	2024	0	—
Charleville	Charleville	Avondhu	Red and white	4	2026	0	—
Clondrohid	Clondrohid	Muskerry	Blue and white	1	1995	0	—
Cloyne	Cloyne	Imokilly	Red and black	6	2016	1	2010
Clyda Rovers	Mourneabbey	Avondhu	Black and amber	5	1989	0	—
Courcey Rovers	Ballinspittle	Carrigdhoun	Red and white	5	2011	0	—
Deel Rovers	Milford	Avondhu	Blue and white	2	1991	0	—
Delaney Rovers	Dublin Hill	Seandún	Green and yellow	6	2018	1	1955
Diarmuid Ó Mathúnas	Castletown-Kinneigh	Carbery	Blue and yellow	0	—	0	—
Dohenys	Dunmanway	Carbery	Green and white	12	1993	3	1993
Donoughmore	Donoughmore	Muskerry	Black and white	5	2025	1	1983
Douglas	Douglas	Seandún	Green, black and white	8	2026	1	1962
Dripsey	Dripsey	Muskerry	Red and blue	0	—	0	—
Dungourney	Dungourney	Imokilly	Green and gold	0	—	0	—
Éire Óg	Ovens	Muskerry	Red and white	2	2008	1	2008
Erin's Own	Caherlag	Imokilly	Red and blue	6	2019	2	2005
Fr. O'Neill's	Ballymacoda	Imokilly	Red and green	4	2015	0	—
Glanmire	Glanmire	Seandún	Green and gold	20	1977	3	1958
Goleen	Goleen	Carbery	Yellow and black	0	—	0	—
Grenagh	Grenagh	Muskerry	Blue and gold	4	2006	0	—
Kanturk	Kanturk	Duhallow	Green and white	5	2011	1	2011
Kilbrin	Kilbrin	Duhallow	Blue and white	0	—	0	—
Kilbrittain	Kilbrittain	Carbery	Black and yellow	1	1926	0	—
Killavullen	Killavullen	Avondhu	Blue and white	4	2023	1	2000
Kilmeen	Rossmore	Carbery	Blue and white	0	—	0	—
Kilmichael	Kilmichael	Muskerry	Blue and gold	7	2013	0	—
Kilmurry	Kilmurry	Muskerry	Green and gold	11	2022	5	2022
Kilshannig	Glantane	Avondhu	Blue and yellow	10	2019	3	2019
Knocknagree	Knocknagree	Duhallow	Blue and white	12	2016	3	2017
Liscarroll Churchtown Gaels	Churchtown	Avondhu	Green, white and yellow	1	2024	0	—
Lisgoold	Lisgoold	Imokilly	Blue and yellow	1	2023	0	—
Lismire	Lismire	Duhallow	Black and amber	0	—	0	—
Lyre	Banteer	Duhallow	Black and white	2	2013	0	—
Mallow	Mallow	Avondhu	Red and yellow	3	1984	0	—
Mayfield	Mayfield	Seandún	Red and white	8	2023	0	—
Midleton	Midleton	Imokilly	Black and white	12	2020	3	1939
Naomh Abán	Ballyvourney	Muskerry	Blue and white	6	1988	2	1988
Nemo Rangers	South Douglas Road	Seandún	Black and green	10	2025	1	1957
Passage West	Passage West	Seandún	Green and white	7	2020	1	1982
Randal Óg	Ballinacarriga	Carbery	Yellow and green	0	—	0	—
Shamrocks	Shanbally	Carrigdhoun	Green and white	13	2016	0	—
St Catherine's	Ballynoe	Imokilly	Purple and yellow	0	—	0	—
St. Colum's	Kealkill	Carbery	Black and orange	1	2013	0	—
St James'	Ardfield	Carbery	Green and gold	2	2022	0	—
St Mary's	Enniskean	Carbery	Yellow and black	2	2014	0	—
St Michael's	Blackrock	Seandún	Yellow and green	6	2022	1	1956
St Oliver Plunketts	Ahiohill	Carbery	Black and white	0	—	0	—
Tadhg Mac Cárthaigh's	Caheragh	Carbery	Red and yellow	7	2021	0	—
Valley Rovers	Innishannon	Carrigdhoun	Green and white	16	2020	0	—
Whitechurch	Whitechurch	Seandún	Maroon and saffron	0	—	0	—
White's Cross	Ballinvriskig	Seandún	Green and white	4	2010	0	—
Youghal	Youghal	Imokilly	Maroon and white	8	2011	3	1999

== Roll of honour ==
=== By club ===
#	Team	Titles	Runners-up	Championships won	Championships runner-up
1	Nils	7	3	1902, 1903, 1904, 1912, 1913, 1914, 1915	1907, 1911, 1924
2	Fermoy	5	3	1898, 1899, 1909, 1936, 1974	1901, 1904, 1908
2	Bandon	5	1	1925, 1929, 1953, 1975, 2015	1952
2	Kilmurry	5	1	1924, 1969, 1980, 1986, 2022	2012
5	Dromtarriffe	4	3	1934, 1938, 1959, 2018	1895, 1932, 1956
5	Canovee	4	1	1950, 1968, 2007, 2023	1948
5	Glanmire	4	0	1923, 1937, 1951, 1958	—
5	Urhan	4	0	1927, 1931, 1960, 1992	—
9	Midleton	3	4	1896, 1917, 1939	1962, 1967, 1969, 1992
9	Dohenys	3	3	1935, 1966, 1993	1898, 1959, 1965
9	Knocknagree	3	3	1984, 1991, 2017	1979, 1982, 1989
9	Ballincollig	3	2	1933, 1940, 1981	1930, 1938
9	Youghal	3	2	1905, 1906, 1999	1940, 1996
9	Glanworth	3	2	1954, 1971, 2009	1949, 1953
9	Millstreet	3	2	1941, 1963, 2014	1902, 1944
9	Kilshannig	3	0	1985, 1996, 2019	—
17	Mitchelstown	2	8	1961, 2013	1928, 1934, 1955, 1957, 1958, 1960, 1973, 2011
17	Bantry Blues	2	3	1928, 1972	1897, 1913, 1915
17	Kiskeam	2	3	1964, 2002	1994, 1997, 2000
17	Cobh	2	2	1901, 1908	1954, 2022
17	Newmarket	2	2	1970, 1998	1927, 1950
17	Kinsale	2	1	1900, 1932	2001
17	Collins	2	1	1945, 1948	1947
17	Erin's Own	2	1	1994, 2005	2017
17	Rockchapel	2	1	1987, 2012	1977
17	William O'Brien's	2	0	1895, 1897	—
17	Castlemagner	2	0	1947, 1952	—
17	Naomh Abán	2	0	1973, 1988	—
17	Newcestown	2	0	1967, 1990	—
30	Adrigole	1	5	2006	1968, 1970, 1971, 1972, 2002, 2004
30	Macroom	1	4	1907	1900, 1905, 1906, 1909
30	Bere Island	1	2	1943	1941, 1946
30	Castletownbere	1	2	1977	1974, 1976
30	Carbery Rangers	1	2	2003	1939, 1987
30	Iveleary	1	2	2020	1929, 2015
30	Lees	1	1	1910	1899
30	Juverna	1	1	1911	1910
30	Knockavilla	1	1	1916	1917
30	St. Patrick's	1	1	1949	1945
30	Delaney Rovers	1	1	1955	1951
30	Kildorrery	1	1	1978	2007
30	Grange	1	1	1979	1966
30	Donoughmore	1	1	1983	2025
30	Aghada	1	1	1989	1981
30	Killavullen	1	1	2000	1998
30	Ilen Rovers	1	1	2001	1999
30	Boherbue	1	1	2021	2020
30	Kilmacabea	1	1	2025	2018
30	Geraldines	1	0	1926	—
30	Clonakilty	1	0	1930	—
30	Combined Services	1	0	1942	—
30	21st Battalion	1	0	1944	—
30	St Vincent's	1	0	1946	—
30	St Michael's	1	0	1956	—
30	Nemo Rangers	1	0	1957	—
30	Douglas	1	0	1962	—
30	Na Piarsaigh	1	0	1965	—
30	Castlehaven	1	0	1976	—
30	Passage West	1	0	1982	—
30	Glenville	1	0	1995	—
30	Ballinora	1	0	1997	—
30	Aghabullogue	1	0	2004	—
30	Éire Óg	1	0	2008	—
30	Cloyne	1	0	2010	—
30	Kanturk	1	0	2011	—
30	Gabriel Rangers	1	0	2016	—
30	Inniscarra	1	0	2024	—
68	St Anne’s	0	3	—	1933, 1935, 1937
68	St. Nicholas'	0	3	—	1923, 1963, 1983
68	O'Donovan Rossa	0	3	—	1912, 1961, 2005
68	Shamrocks	0	3	—	1916, 1931, 2016
68	Ballygarvan	0	3	—	2008, 2009, 2024
68	Valley Rovers	0	2	—	1985, 1986
68	Clyda Rovers	0	2	—	1980, 1988
68	Ballindangan	0	1	—	1896
68	Carrigadrohid	0	1	—	1903
68	Sundays Well	0	1	—	1914
68	Commons Road	0	1	—	1925
68	Kilbrittain	0	1	—	1926
68	Cullen	0	1	—	1936
68	Clann na nGael	0	1	—	1942
68	Commercials	0	1	—	1943
68	Crosshaven	0	1	—	1964
68	Carrignavar	0	1	—	1975
68	Brian Dillons	0	1	—	1978
68	Mallow	0	1	—	1984
68	Castlemartyr	0	1	—	1990
68	Deel Rovers	0	1	—	1991
68	Carrigtwohill	0	1	—	1993
68	Tadhg McCarthaigh's	0	1	—	1995
68	Cill Na Martra	0	1	—	2003
68	Grenagh	0	1	—	2006
68	White's Cross	0	1	—	2010
68	St Colum's	0	1	—	2013
68	St Finbarr's	0	1	—	2014
68	St James'	0	1	—	2019
68	Ballinhassig	0	1	—	2021
68	Mayfield	0	1	—	2023

=== By Division ===
#	Division	Titles	Most recent win
1	Seandún	22	1982
2	Duhallow	20	2021
2	Muskerry	20	2023
4	Imokilly	19	2010
5	Carbery	19	2025
6	Avondhu	16	2019
7	Beara	7	2006
8	Carrigdhoun	2	1932

== List of Finals ==
=== List of Cork JAFC finals ===
Year	Winners		Runners-up		#
Year	Club	Score	Club	Score	#
2026	Championship in progress				
2025	Kilmacabea	1-14	Donoughmore	1-07	
2024	Inniscarra	1-07	Ballygarvan	1-06	
2023	Canovee	4-14	Mayfield	1-11	
2022	Kilmurry	1-12	Cobh	0-08	
2021	Boherbue	3-08	Ballinhassig	2-08	
2020	Iveleary	3–11	Boherbue	1-06	
2019	Kilshannig	0–22	St James'	0–11	
2018	Dromtarriffe	2-09	Kilmacabea	2-08	
2017	Knocknagree	2–19	Erin's Own	2–10	
2016	Gabriel Rangers	2–13	Shamrocks	2-07	
2015	Bandon	3–11	Iveleary	2-09	
2014	Millstreet	1-09	St Finbarr's	1-08	
2013	Mitchelstown	0–12	St Colum's	2-04	
2012	Rockchapel	1-07	Kilmurry	0-07	
2011	Kanturk	1–20	Mitchelstown	0-04	
2010	Cloyne	0–10	White's Cross	0-09	
2009	Glanworth	0-08	Ballygarvan	0-05	
2008	Éire Óg	1-08	Ballygarvan	1-05	
2007	Canovee	1-08	Kildorrery	0-09	
2006	Adrigole	0-05	Grenagh	0-03	
2005	Erin's Own	1–12	O'Donovan Rossa	1–11	
2004	Aghabullogue	1-09	Adrigole	1-07	
2003	Carbery Rangers	0–10	Kilnamartyr	0-05	
2002	Kiskeam	0–19	Adrigole	0-09	
2001	Ilen Rovers	0–14	Kinsale	1-01	
2000	Killavullen	1–12	Kiskeam	2-05	
1999	Youghal	3-08	Ilen Rovers	1–13	
1998	Newmarket	0-09	Killavullen	0-08	
1997	Ballinora	0–12	Kiskeam	2-05	
1996	Kilshannig	1-07	Youghal	0-05	
1995	Glenville	0-08	Tadhg MacCarthaigh	0-05	
1994	Erin's Own	0–15	Kiskeam	2-07	
1993	Dohenys	1–10	Carrigtwohill	0-06	
1992	Urhan	1–10, 0–12, 1–06 (2R)	Midleton	2-07, 1–09, 0–03 (2R)	
1991	Knocknagree	2-07	Deel Rovers	1-08	
1990	Newcestown	0–12	Castlemartyr	0-05	
1989	Aghada	0-09, 0–08 (R)	Knocknagree	0-09, 0–04 (R)	
1988	Naomh Abán	1-08	Clyda Rovers	2-04	
1987	Rockchapel	2-05	Carbery Rangers	1-04	
1986	Kilmurry	0-06	Valley Rovers	0-05	
1985	Kilshannig	1-07, 2–06 (R)	Valley Rovers	0–10, 2–04 (R)	
1984	Knocknagree	0–13	Mallow	1-09	
1983	Donoughmore	1-03	St. Nicholas'	0-05	
1982	Passage West	1-04	Knocknagree	0-06	
1981	Ballincollig	2–11	Aghada	2-07	
1980	Kilmurry	1-04	Clyda Rovers	0-01	
1979	Grange	0–14	Knocknagree	2-04	
1978	Kildorrery	3-06	Brian Dillons	1-08	
1977	Castletownbere	3-05	Rockchapel	0-08	
1976	Castlehaven	3-07	Castletownbere	0-06	
1975	Bandon	1–11	Carrignavar	1-01	
1974	Fermoy	1-07	Castletownbere	0-08	
1973	Naomh Abán	2–15	Mitchelstown	0-05	
1972	Bantry Blues	1–12	Adrigole	2-06	
1971	Glanworth	1-08	Adrigole	0-08	
1970	Newmarket	1-09	Adrigole	2-04	
1969	Kilmurry *		Midleton		
1968	Canovee	3-06	Adrigole	1–11	
1967	Newcestown	2–12	Midleton	1-02	
1966	Dohenys	1-04, 3–08 (R)	Grange	1-04, 1–06 (R)	
1965	Na Piarsaigh	1-03	Dohenys	0-04	
1964	Kiskeam	1–10	Crosshaven	1-01	
1963	Millstreet	3-09	St. Nicholas	2-07	
1962	Douglas	2–10	Midleton	1-03	
1961	Mitchelstown	2-08	O'Donovan Rossa	2-04	
1960	Urhan	1-07	Mitchelstown	0-04	
1959	Dromtarriffe	5-01	Dohenys	3-01	
1958	Glanmire	2-07	Mitchelstown	2-05	
1957	Nemo Rangers	1-05	Mitchelstown	0-05	
1956	St Michael's	5-06	Dromtarriffe	0-05	
1955	Delaneys	1-08	Mitchelstown	1-05	
1954	Glanworth	1-06	Cobh	1-04	
1953	Bandon	1-04	Glanworth	1-02	
1952	Castlemagner	1-07	Bandon	1-05	
1951	Glanmire	1-04, 3–02 (R)	Delaneys	1-04, 1–05 (R)	
1950	Canovee	0-04, 3–06 (R)	Newmarket	0-04, 1–04 (R)	
1949	St. Patrick's	1-06	Glanworth	1-01	
1948	Collins	5–11	Canovee	3-00	
1947	Castlemagner	0-06	Collins	0-03	
1946	St Vincent's	3-06	Bere Island	1-04	
1945	Collins	1-05, 3–07 (R)	St. Patrick's	2-02, 0–02 (R)	
1944	21st Battalion	2-06	Millstreet	0-03	
1943	Bere Island	5-04	Commercials	1-03	
1942	Combined Services	3-05	Clann na Gael	0-04	
1941	Millstreet	1-02	Bere Island	0-03	
1940	Ballincollig	1-06	Youghal	1-03	
1939	Midleton	2-06	Carbery Rangers	1-02	
1938	Dromtarriffe	2-04	Ballincollig	1-01	
1937	Sarsfields	2-02	St. Anne's	0-02	
1936	Fermoy	3-01	Cullen	0-02	
1935	Dohenys	1-03	St. Anne's	0-03	
1934	Dromtarriffe	2-02	Mitchelstown	0-00	
1933	Ballincollig	3-01	Shamrocks	1-01	
1932	Kinsale	1-02	Dromtarriffe	0-01	
1931	Urhan	0-06	Shamrocks	0-02	
1930	Clonakilty	2-03	Ballincollig	0-00	
1929	Bandon	1-03	Iveleary	0-00	
1928	Bantry Blues	2-02	Mitchelstown	2-01	
1927	Urhan	1-06	Newmarket	1-00	
1926	Geraldines	2-03	Kilbrittain	1-02	
1925	Bandon	0-02	Commons Road	0-01	
1924	Kilmurry	1-02	Nils	0-02	
1923	Glanmire	1-03 *	St. Nicholas'	1-03	
1919–1922	No Championship				
1918	No final *				
1917	Midleton	5-02	Knockavilla	0-00	
1916	Knockavilla	1-04	Shamrocks	1-00	
1915	Nils	2-01	Bantry Blues	0-01	
1914	Nils		Sundays Well		
1913	Nils	4-02	Bantry	2-02	
1912	Nils	2-02	Skibbereen	0-00	
1911	Juverna	1-00	Nils	0-00	
1910	Lees	2-08	Juverna	0-02	
1909	Fermoy	0-06	Macroom	0-04	
1908	Cobh		Fermoy		
1907	Macroom		Nils		
1906	Youghal		Macroom		
1905	Youghal		Macroom		
1904	Nils		Fermoy		
1903	Nils		Carrigadrohid		
1902	Nils		Millstreet		
1901	Cobh		Fermoy		
1900	Kinsale		Macroom		
1899	Fermoy		Lees		
1898	Fermoy		Dohenys		
1897	William O'Brien's		Bantry		
1896	Midleton	0-01 *	Ballindangan	0-01	
1895	William O'Brien's	0-04	Dromtarriffe	0-01	

=== Notes ===
- Midleton beat Bantry Blues in other semi-final but both were disqualified so Kilmurry were awarded the title
- In 1923, Glanmire won title in replay
- 1918 – Youghal and Meelin qualified for final which was not played
- 1896 Midleton won title in replay

== Records ==
=== Gaps ===
  - Top ten longest gaps between successive championship titles:
    - 93 years: Youghal (1906–1999)
    - 52 years: Mitchelstown (1961–2013)
    - 51 years: Millstreet (1963–2014)
    - 45 years: Kilmurray (1924–1969)
    - 44 years: Bantry Blues (1928–1972)
    - 41 years: Ballincollig (1940–1981)
    - 40 years: Bandon (1975–2015)
    - 39 years: Fermoy (1936–1974)
    - 39 years: Canovee (1968–2007)
    - 38 years: Glanworth (1971–2009)

=== Divisional winners by year ===
Year	Duhallow	Avondhu	Muskerry	Carbery	Seandun	Carrigdhoun	Imokilly
2026	Castlemagner	Charleville	Aghinagh	Barryroe	Douglas	Carrigaline	Carrignavar
2025	Castlemagner	Charleville	Donoughmore	Kilmacabea	Nemo Rangers	Ballygarvan	Carrignavar
2024	Castlemagner	Liscarroll Churchtown Gaels	Inniscarra	Kilmacabea	Douglas	Ballygarvan	Castlemartyr
2023	Castlemagner	Killavullen	Canovee	Barryroe	Mayfield	Ballygarvan	Lisgoold
2022	Cullen	Buttevant	Kilmurry	St James'	St Michael's	Kinsale	Cobh
2021	Boherbue	Kilworth	Aghinagh	Tadhg McCarthaigh's	Douglas	Ballinhassig	Bride Rovers
2020	Boherbue	Charleville	Iveleary	Kilmacabea	Passage West	Valley Rovers	Midleton
2019	Boherbue	Kilshannig	Iveleary	St James'	St Michael's	Ballinhassig	Erin's Own
2018*	Boherbue	Charleville	Iveleary	Kilmacabea	Delaney Rovers	Ballymartle	Midleton
2017*	Boherbue	Buttevant	Kilmurry	Kilmacabea	Delaney Rovers	Valley Rovers	Erin's Own
2016	Knocknagree	Ballyclough	Kilmurry	Gabriel Rangers	Brian Dillons	Shamrocks	Cloyne

==== Notes ====
- 2017 — Knocknagree won the championship but did not win their division.
- 2018 — Dromtarriffe won the championship but did not win their division.

== Other Junior championships ==
=== Junior B Inter-Divisional Football Championship ===
Year	Winner		Runners-up	
Year	Club	Score	Club	Score
2025	Carrigaline	1-15	Ballyphehane	1-12
2024	Douglas	0-08	Goleen	0-04
2023	Douglas	1-12	Goleen	2-07
2022	Blarney	4-06	Fr O'Neill's	2-11
2021	Randal Óg	1-11	Dripsey	0-13
2020	Mallow	4–10	Carrigaline	1-05
2019	St Michael's	3–15	Goleen	2-07
2018	Russell Rovers	3–15	Castletownbere	1–10
2017	Cobh	4–14	Cill Na Martra	2-06
2016	Kilbrittain	0–11	Cobh	1-04
2015	Béal Átha'n Ghaorthaidh	1–14	Ballinacurra	0–14

== See also ==
- Cork Junior A Hurling Championship
- Cork Junior B Football Championship
- Cork Junior C Football Championship

== Sources ==
- Cork Junior Football Champions
