= Cork City Junior A Football Championship =

Annual Gaelic football competition

City Junior A Football Championship
- Title holders: Douglas (8th title)
- Most titles: Nemo Rangers; St Anne's (10 titles)
- Sponsors: Sports Turf Solutions

The Cork City Junior A Football Championship (known for sponsorship reasons as the EBO Home Rescue Cork City Junior A Football Championship) is an annual Gaelic football competition organised by the Seandún Board of the Gaelic Athletic Association since 1926 for junior Gaelic football teams in Cork, Ireland.

The series of games begin in May, with the championship culminating with the final in the autumn. The championship includes a group stage whereby each team is guaranteed at least two games.

The Cork City Junior A Championship is an integral part of the wider Cork Junior A Football Championship. The winners of the city championship join their counterparts from the other seven divisions to contest the county championship. 10 clubs currently participate in the City Championship.

The competition has been won by 18 teams, 17 of which have won it more than once. Douglas are the title-holders, defeating Mayfield by 2–15 to 0–10 in the 2026 final.

== Teams ==
=== 2026 Teams ===
The 10 teams that competed in the 2026 Cork City Junior A Hurling Championship are:

Team	Location	Colours	Position in 2026	In championship since	Championship Titles	Last Championship Title
Ballyphehane	Ballyphehane	Blue and white	Group stage	2026	0	—
Bishopstown	Bishopstown	Maroon and white	Semi-finals	?	2	1992
Douglas	Douglas	Green, black and white	Champions	?	8	2026
Glanmire	Glanmire	Green and gold	Group stage	2025	0	—
Mayfield	Mayfield	Red and white	Runners-up	2021	8	2023
Nemo Rangers	South Douglas Road	Black and green	Group stage	?	10	2025
Passage West	Passage West	Green and white	Semi-finals	?	7	2020
St Michael's	Blackrock	Green and yellow	Preliminary quarter-finals	2024	6	2022
Whitechurch	Whitechurch	Maroon and saffron	Group stage	2021	0	—
White's Cross	Ballinvriskig	Green and white	Quarter-finals	?	4	2010

== Qualification for subsequent competitions ==
The Cork City Junior A Football Championship winners qualify for the subsequent Cork Junior A Football Championship.

== Roll of honour ==
=== By club ===
#	Club	Titles	Runners-up	Championships won	Championships runner-up
1	Nemo Rangers	10	9	1957, 1967, 1979, 1990, 1995, 1996, 1999, 2002, 2007, 2025	1956, 1971, 1997, 1998, 2000, 2004, 2008, 2023, 2024
1	St Anne's	10	2	1927, 1929, 1931, 1932, 1933, 1934, 1935, 1937, 1939, 1940	1938, 1941
3	St Finbarr's	9	12	1941, 1947, 1951, 1960, 1961, 1988, 2011, 2013, 2014	1929, 1949, 1957, 1958, 1972, 1973, 1979, 1986, 2001, 2009, 2010, 2012
3	St. Nicholas'	9	7	1930, 1943, 1958, 1963, 1972, 1981, 1983, 1984, 1985	1936, 1947, 1959, 1965, 1982, 1994, 1996
5	Douglas	8	5	1962, 1970, 1973, 2004, 2012, 2021, 2024, 2026	1960, 1969, 1974, 2003, 2011
5	Mayfield	8	3	1959, 1968, 1975, 1997, 2000, 2001, 2003, 2023	2002, 2025, 2026
7	Brian Dillons	7	9	1936, 1938, 1977, 1978, 1991, 1998, 2016	1935, 1948, 1950, 1975, 1976, 1999, 2013, 2015, 2022
7	Passage West	7	7	1969, 1980, 1982, 1989, 1993, 1994, 2020	1966, 1967, 1970, 1981, 1992, 2014, 2019
9	St Michael's	6	5	1952, 1953, 1956, 1987, 2019, 2022	1954, 1955, 1983, 2018, 2021
9	Delaney Rovers	6	4	1954, 1955, 1977, 2015, 2017, 2018	1951, 1980, 2016, 2020
11	Na Piarsaigh	4	4	1964, 1965, 1974, 2005	1946, 1961, 1990, 1995
11	White's Cross	4	2	2006, 2008, 2009, 2010	2005, 2017
13	St Vincent's	3	8	1946, 1950, 1966	1945, 1962, 1977, 1978, 1987, 1989, 2006, 2007
13	St. Patrick's	3	0	1944, 1945, 1949	—
15	Bishopstown	2	3	1971, 1992	1968, 1991, 1993,
15	Commercials	2	1	1942, 1948	1943
15	Geraldines	2	0	1926, 1928	—
18	Lough Rovers	1	2	1986	1931, 1984,
19	UCC	0	1	—	1928
19	Fr. Matthew Hall	0	1	—	1937
19	Sunbeam	0	1	—	1944
19	CIE	0	1	—	1953
19	Garda	0	1	—	1963
19	Rathpeacon	0	1	—	1964
19	Whitechurch	0	1	—	1985
19	Ballinure	0	1	—	1988

== List of finals ==
Year	Winners		Runners-up	
Year	Club	Score	Club	Score
2026	Douglas	2-15	Mayfield	0-10
2025	Nemo Rangers	3-15	Mayfield	2-11
2024	Douglas	1-08	Nemo Rangers	0-10
2023	Mayfield	3-09	Nemo Rangers	1-07
2022	St Michael's	2–11	Brian Dillons	1–11
2021	Douglas	0–12	St Michael's	1-04
2020	Passage	1–13	Delaney Rovers	0-07
2019	St Michael's	1–17	Passage	2-08
2018	Delaney Rovers	3–12	St Michael's	0-09
2017	Delaney Rovers	1–11	White's Cross	0–12
2016	Brian Dillons	1-12 aet	Delaney Rovers	1-07
2015	Delaney Rovers	0–15	Brian Dillons	1-03
2014	St Finbarr's	0–10	Passage	0-08
2013	St Finbarr's	1-07, 1-13 (R)	Brian Dillons	0–10, 1-10 (R)
2012	Douglas	2–12	St Finbarr's	1-07
2011	St Finbarr's	0–11, 0-09 (R)	Douglas	1-08, 1-04 (R)
2010	White's Cross	0–15, 0-18 (R)	St Finbarr's	3-06,1-09
2009	White's Cross	2–13	St Finbarr's	1-05
2008	White's Cross	1–12	Nemo Rangers	0-07
2007	Nemo Rangers	0–10	St Vincent's	0-07
2006	White's Cross	0–12	St Vincent's	1-04
2005	Na Piarsaigh	1-09	White's Cross	0-06
2004	Douglas	1–12	Nemo Rangers	2-06
2003	Mayfield	1-08	Douglas	0-03
2002	Nemo Rangers	0–15	Mayfield	0–11
2001	Mayfield	2–13	St Finbarr's	0-08
2000	Mayfield	1–16	Nemo Rangers	1-08
1999	Nemo Rangers	1-09	Brian Dillons	1-08
1998	Brian Dillons	1-08	Nemo Rangers	0-06
1997	Mayfield	1–11, 1-13 (R)	Nemo Rangers	1–11, 0-11 (R)
1996	Nemo Rangers	1–10	St. Nicholas	1-08
1995	Nemo Rangers	1–13	Na Piarsaigh	1-07
1994	Passage West	4–11	St. Nicholas	0-09
1993	Passage West	0-05, 2-07 (R)	Bishopstown	0-05, 0-12 (R)
1992	Bishopstown	1–10	Passage West	0-08
1991	Brian Dillons	0–10, 1-10 (R)	Bishopstown	0–10, 0-10 (R)
1990	Nemo Rangers	2–10	Na Piarsaigh	0-07
1989	Passage West	3–12	St Vincent's	1-08
1988	St Finbarr's	1–11	Ballinure	2-04
1987	St Michael's	0–11	St Vincent's	0-08
1986	Lough Rovers	0-06	St Finbarr's	0-05
1985	St. Nicholas	3-08	Whitechurch	2-08
1984	St. Nicholas	1-06	Lough Rovers	0-08
1983	St. Nicholas	1-08	St Michael's	0-07
1982	Passage West	0–13	St. Nicholas	1-07
1981	St. Nicholas	1–12	Passage West	3-04
1980	Passage West	1-07, 2-06	Delaney Rovers	2-04, 1-01
1979	Nemo Rangers	1-08	St Finbarr's	1-05
1978	Brian Dillons	1–13	St Vincent's	1-06
1977	Brian Dillons	1–10	St Vincent's	2-04
1976	Delaney Rovers	0–10	Brian Dillons	0-06
1975	Mayfield	1–12	Brian Dillons	1-06
1974	Na Piarsaigh	2-07	Douglas	0–10
1973	Douglas	1–12	St Finbarr's	3-04
1972	St. Nicholas	4-07	St Finbarr's	0–11
1971	Bishopstown	0-07, 0–11	Nemo Rangers	0-07, 0-09
1970	Douglas	2-08	Passage West	0-09
1969	Passage West	3-03, 0-09	Douglas	1-09, 1-05
1968	Mayfield	2-08	Bishopstown	2-04
1967	Nemo Rangers	0–10, 2-09	Passage West	1-07, 0-05
1966	St Vincent's	2-08	Passage West	3-01
1965	Na Piarsaigh	1-08	St. Nicholas	0-05
1964	Na Piarsaigh	1-08	Rathpeacon	1-06
1963	St. Nicholas	3-09	Garda	0-03
1962	Douglas	2-07	St Vincent's	0-06
1961	St Finbarr's	1-08	Na Piarsaigh	1-04
1960	St Finbarr's	2-07	Douglas	0-04
1959	Mayfield	1-04	St. Nicholas	0-06
1958	St. Nicholas	1-01	St Finbarr's	0-02
1957	Nemo Rangers	1-06	St Finbarr's	0-04
1956	St Michael's	2-11	Nemo Rangers	1-04
1955	Delaney Rovers	2-03	St Michael's	1-04
1954	Delaney Rovers	3-03	St Michael's	1-05
1953	St Michael's	0-07	CIE	0-02
1952	St Michael's			
1951	St Finbarr's	3-01	Delaney Rovers	0-05
1950	St Vincent's	2-01	Brian Dillons	1-03
1949	St.Patricks	1-05	St Finbarr's	1-02
1948	Commercials	3-03	Brian Dillons	1-02
1947	St Finbarr's	4-02	St. Nicholas	2-05
1946	St Vincent's	0-05	Na Piarsaigh	1-01
1945	St.Patricks	3-03	St Vincent's	0-03
1944	St.Patricks	1-05	Sunbeam	0-01
1943	St. Nicholas	0-09, 1-04	Commercials	2-03, 1-02
1942	Commercials			
1941	St Finbarr's	3-05	St.Annes	1-01
1940	St.Annes			
1939	St.Annes			
1938	Brian Dillons	3-08	St.Annes	3-02
1937	St.Annes	5-01	Fr.Matthew Hall	1-03
1936	Brian Dillons		St. Nicholas	
1935	St.Annes	0-01	Brian Dillons	1-02
1934	St.Annes			
1933	St.Annes			
1932	St.Annes			
1931	St.Annes	0-03	Lough Rovers	0-00
1930	St. Nicholas			
1929	Hillside		St Finbarr's	
1928	Geraldines	1-01	UCC	1-00
1927	St.Annes			
1926	Geraldines			

== See also ==
- Cork City Junior A Hurling Championship
