= Mid Cork Junior A Football Championship =

- Irish: Craobh Peile Sóisear A Múscraí
- Code: Gaelic football
- Founded: 1926; 100 years ago
- Region: Muskerry (GAA)
- No. of teams: 12
- Title holders: Aghinagh (2nd title)
- Most titles: Canovee (17 titles)
- Sponsors: Ross Oil
- Official website: Muskerry GAA

The Mid Cork Junior A Football Championship (known for sponsorship reasons as the Ross Oil Junior A Football Championship) is an annual club Gaelic football competition organised by the Mid Cork Board of the Gaelic Athletic Association and contested by junior-ranked teams in the Muskerry region in County Cork, Ireland, deciding the competition winners through a group and knockout format.

Introduced in 1926 as the Mid Cork Junior Football Championship, it was initially a straight knockout tournament. The competition went through a number of format changes since then, including the introduction of a back-door or second chance for beaten teams.

In its present format, the 12 teams are drawn into three groups of four teams and play each other in a single round-robin system. The four group winners and four group runners-up proceed to the knockout phase that culminates with the final. The winner of the Mid Cork Junior A Championship, as well as being presented with the cup, qualifies for the subsequent Cork Junior A Football Championship.

The title has been won at least once by 18 different clubs. The all-time record-holders are Canovee, who have won a total of 17 titles. Aghinagh are the title-holders after defeating Kilmichael by 2–12 to 1–13 in the 2026 final.

== Teams ==
=== 2026 Teams ===
The 12 teams competing in the 2026 Mid Cork Junior A Football Championship are:

Team	Location	Colours	Position in 2025	In championship since	Championship Titles	Last Championship Title
Aghinagh	Rusheen	Blue and white	Runners-up	?	2	2026
Ballincollig	Ballincollig	Green and white	Quarter-finals	?	13	1981
Ballinora	Ballinora	Green and red	Group stage	2024	3	1997
Béal Átha'n Ghaorthaidh	Ballingeary	Red and black	Quarter-finals	2016	4	2005
Clondrohid	Clondrohid	Blue and white	Group stage	?	1	1995
Donoughmore	Donoughmore	Black and white	Champions	?	5	2025
Dripsey	Dripsey	Red and blue	Group stage	2022	0	—
Éire Óg	Ovens	Red and white	Semi-finals	2013	2	2008
Grenagh	Grenagh	Blue and gold	Semi-finals	2020	4	2006
Kilmichael	Kilmichael	Blue and gold	Group stage	?	7	2013
Kilmurry	Kimurry	Green and gold	Group stage	2025	11	2022
Naomh Abán	Ballyvourney	Blue and white	Junior B champions	2026	6	1988

== Qualification for subsequent competitions ==
The Mid Cork Junior A Championship winners qualify for the subsequent Cork Junior A Football Championship.

== Roll of honour ==
=== By club ===
#	Club	Titles	Runners-up	Championships won	Championships runner-up
1	Canovee	17	6	1939, 1943, 1946, 1947, 1948, 1949, 1950, 1955, 1957, 1961, 1962, 1968, 1979, 1982, 1999, 2007, 2023	1933, 1936, 1938, 1940, 1988, 2018
2	Ballincollig	13	9	1927, 1930, 1933, 1936, 1937, 1938, 1940, 1944, 1964, 1966, 1972, 1977, 1981	1929, 1935, 1945, 1948, 1965, 1975, 1980, 2010, 2021
3	Kilmurry	11	13	1931, 1969, 1978, 1980, 1984, 1986, 2012, 2014, 2016, 2017, 2022	1926, 1927, 1934, 1939, 1944, 1947, 1966, 1967, 1968, 1979, 1985, 2013, 2020
4	Iveleary	10	7	1929, 1932, 1935, 1941, 1958, 1985, 2015, 2018, 2019, 2020	1951, 1991, 2006, 2007, 2012, 2016, 2017
5	Kilmichael	7	2	1953, 1956, 1959, 1960, 1963, 1987, 2013	1996, 2026
6	Naomh Abán	6	1	1928, 1967, 1970, 1971, 1973, 1988	1959
7	Donoughmore	5	9	1952, 1983, 1998, 2011, 2025	1953, 1956, 1957, 1962, 1976, 1981, 1982, 1993, 2000
7	Macroom	5	2	1926, 1934, 1942, 1945, 1991	1930, 1955
9	Béal Átha'n Ghaorthaidh	4	9	1965, 1992, 1994, 2005	1960, 1961, 1963, 1977, 1987, 1989, 1997, 2001, 2003
9	Grenagh	4	3	1993, 2000, 2001, 2006	2002, 2004, 2005
9	Blarney	4	3	1951, 1954, 2009, 2010	1986, 1990, 1994
12	Ballinora	3	1	1990, 1996, 1997	1932
13	Aghinagh	2	7	2021, 2026	1992, 1995, 2014, 2019, 2022, 2024, 2025
13	Our Lady's Hospital	2	4	1974, 1975	1954, 1969, 1971, 1978
13	Cill na Martra	2	3	2002, 2003	1958, 1964, 1999
13	Éire Óg	2	3	1976, 2008	1972, 1973, 1983
13	Inniscarra	2	3	1989, 2024	1941, 2015, 2023
18	Clondrohid	1	5	1995	1928, 1931, 1937, 1984, 1998
18	Aghabullogue	1	0	2004	—
20	Whitechurch	0	2	—	1970, 1974
20	Dripsey	0	2	—	2008, 2011
20	31st Battalion	0	1	—	1943
20	Cloughduv	0	1	—	1949
20	St Gobnaits	0	1	—	1950
20	Gleann na Laoi	0	1	—	1952

=== Notes ===
- The runners-up in 1942, 1946, 2009 are unknown.

== List of Finals ==
Year	Winners		Runners-up		#
Year	Club	Score	Club	Score	#
2026	Aghinagh	2–12	Kilmichael	1–13	
2025	Donoughmore	0–15, 2–15	Aghinagh	1–12, 2–14	
2024	Inniscarra	3-10	Aghinagh	3-09	
2023	Canovee	1-15	Inniscarra	2-06	
2022	Kilmurry	3-10	Aghinagh	1-08	
2021	Aghinagh	1-12	Ballincollig	0-09	
2020	Iveleary	1-11	Kilmurry	0-13	
2019	Iveleary	2-21	Aghinagh	1-10	
2018	Iveleary	1-09	Canovee	1-06	
2017	Kilmurry	2-19	Iveleary	2-14	
2016	Kilmurry	1-10	Iveleary	0-11	
2015	Iveleary	0-14	Inniscarra	1-05	
2014	Kilmurry	3-07	Aghinagh	2-04	
2013	Kilmichael	2-09	Kilmurry	0-09	
2012	Kilmurry	1-15	Iveleary	1-11	
2011	Donoughmore	1-07	Dripsey	1-04	
2010	Blarney		Ballincollig		
2009	Blarney		Dripsey		
2008	Éire Óg	2-13	Dripsey	1-13	
2007	Canovee		Iveleary		
2006	Grenagh		Iveleary		
2005	Béal Átha Ghaorthaidh		Grenagh		
2004	Aghabullogue		Grenagh		
2003	Cill Na Martra		Béal Átha Ghaorthaidh		
2002	Cill Na Martra		Grenagh		
2001	Grenagh		Béal Átha Ghaorthaidh		
2000	Grenagh		Donoughmore		
1999	Canovee		Cill Na Martra		
1998	Donoughmore		Clondrohid		
1997	Ballinora		Béal Átha Ghaorthaidh		
1996	Ballinora		Kilmichael		
1995	Clondrohid		Aghinagh		
1994	Béal Átha Ghaorthaidh		Blarney		
1993	Grenagh		Donoughmore		
1992	Béal Átha Ghaorthaidh		Aghinagh		
1991	Macroom		Iveleary		
1990	Ballinora		Blarney		
1989	Inniscarra		Béal Átha Ghaorthaidh		
1988	Naomh Abán		Canovee		
1987	Kilmichael		Béal Átha Ghaorthaidh		
1986	Kilmurry		Blarney		
1985	Iveleary		Kilmurry		
1984	Kilmurry		Clondrohid		
1983	Donoughmore		Éire Óg		
1982	Canovee		Donoughmore		
1981	Ballincollig		Donoughmore		
1980	Kilmurry		Ballincollig		
1979	Canovee		Kilmurry		
1978	Kilmurry		Our Lady's Hospital		
1977	Ballincollig		Béal Átha Ghaorthaidh		
1976	Éire Óg		Donoughmore		
1975	Our Lady's Hospital		Ballincollig		
1974	Our Lady's Hospital		Whitechurch		
1973	Naomh Abán		Éire Óg		
1972	Ballincollig		Éire Óg		
1971	Naomh Abán		Our Lady's Hospital		
1970	Naomh Abán		Whitechurch		
1969	Kilmurry		Our Lady's Hospital		
1968	Canovee		Kilmurry		
1967	Naomh Abán		Kilmurry		
1966	Ballincollig		Kilmurry		
1965	Béal Átha Ghaorthaidh		Ballincollig		
1964	Ballincollig		Cill Na Martra		
1963	Kilmichael		Béal Átha Ghaorthaidh		
1962	Canovee	2-4 (D), 1-09 (R)	Donoughmore	1-07 (D), 0-02 (R)	
1961	Canovee	1-10	Béal Átha Ghaorthaidh	2-02	
1960	Kilmichael	4-12	Béal Átha Ghaorthaidh	2-04	
1959	Kilmichael	1-14	Naomh Abán	0-13	
1958	Iveleary	4-07	Cill Na Martra	5-02	
1957	Canovee	1-14	Donoughmore	1-09	
1956	Kilmichael	3-07	Donoughmore	1-06	
1955	Canovee	5-05	Macroom	2-03	
1954	Blarney		Our Lady's Hospital		
1953	Kilmichael	0-05	Donoughmore	0-02	
1952	Donoughmore	2-03	Gleann na Laoi	1-01	
1951	Blarney	1-03	Iveleary	1-02	
1950	Canovee		Naomh Abán		
1949	Canovee	3-04	Cloughduv	0-01	
1948	Canovee		Ballincollig		
1947	Canovee	4-04	Kilmurry	0-03	
1946	Canovee				
1945	Macroom		Ballincollig		
1944	Ballincollig	2-06	Kilmurry	2-04	
1943	Canovee	5-01	31st Battalion	1-02	
1942	Macroom				
1941	Iveleary	1-07	Inniscarra Valley	0-01	
1940	Ballincollig	1-07	Canovee	0-03	
1939	Canovee	2-04	Kilmurry	2-03	
1938	Ballincollig		Cill Na Martra		
1937	Ballincollig	3-02 (R)	Clondrohid	2-00 (R)	
1936	Ballincollig	1-02	Canovee	0-02	
1935	Iveleary		Ballincollig		
1934	Macroom	3-05	Kilmurry	1-03	
1933	Ballincollig	5-01	Canovee	0-00	
1932	Iveleary		Ballinora		
1931	Kilmurry	0-03	Clondrohid	0-01	
1930	Ballincollig	4-01	Macroom	1-01	
1929	Iveleary	1-02	Ballincollig	1-01	
1928	Naomh Abán	3-02	Clondrohid	1-00	
1927	Ballincollig	2-02	Kilmurry	0-01	
1926	Macroom	0-02	Kilmurry	0-00	

== Records ==
=== By decade ===
The most successful team of each decade, judged by number of Mid Cork Junior Football Championship titles, is as follows:

- 1920s: 1 each for Macroom (1926), Ballincollig (1927), Naomh Abán (1928) and Iveleary (1929)
- 1930s: 5 for Ballincollig (1930-33-36-37-38)
- 1940s: 5 for Canovee (1943-46-47-48-49)
- 1950s: 3 each for Canovee (1950-55-57) and Kilmichael (1953-56-59)
- 1960s: 3 for Canovee (1961-62-68)
- 1970s: 3 for Naomh Abán (1970-71-73)
- 1980s: 3 for Kilmurry (1980-84-86)
- 1990s: 3 for Ballinora (1990-96-97)
- 2000s: 3 for Grenagh (2000-01-06)
- 2010s: 4 for Kilmurry (2012-14-16-17)

=== Gaps ===
Top ten longest gaps between successive championship titles:

- 55 years: Blarney (1954-2009)
- 46 years: Macroom (1945-1991)
- 39 years: Naomh Abán (1928-1967)
- 38 years: Kilmurry (1931-1969)
- 32 years: Éire Óg (1976-2008)
- 31 years: Donoughmore (1952-1983)
- 30 years: Iveleary (1985-2015)
- 27 years: Béal Átha'n Ghaorthaidh (1965-1992)
- 27 years: Iveleary (1958-1985)
- 26 years: Kilmichael (1987-2013)
- 26 years: Kilmurry (1986-2012)

== See also ==
- Mid Cork Junior A Hurling Championship
