= 2026 Cork Junior A Football Championship =

Annual Gaelic football competition season

- Dates: 31 October – November 2026
- Teams: 7
- Sponsor: McCarthy Insurance Group

Tournament statistics
- Matches played: 5
- Goals scored: 14 (2.8 per match)
- Points scored: 116 (23.2 per match)
- Top scorer: Ryan O'Donovan (2–14)

The 2026 Cork Junior A Football Championship is the 128th staging of the Cork Junior A Football Championship since its establishment by the Cork County Board in 1895. The championship is scheduled to run from 31 October to November 2026.

== Qualification ==
Division	Championship	Champions
Avondhu	North Cork Junior A Football Championship	Charleville
Carbery	Carbery Junior A Football Championship	Barryroe
Carrigdhoun	South East Junior A Football Championship	Carrigaline
Duhallow	Duhallow Junior A Football Championship	Castlemagner
Imokilly	East Cork Junior A Football Championship	Carraig na bhFear
Muskerry	Mid Cork Junior A Football Championship	Aghinagh
Seandún	City Junior A Football Championship	Douglas

== Divisional championships ==
=== Duhallow JAFC ===
Semi-Finals
Ballydesmond	0–14
Lyre	1–09
Castlemagner	1–18 (aet)
Lismire	0–17

Final
Ballydesmond	1–09
Castlemagner	1–10

=== North Cork JAFC ===
Quarter-Finals
Clyda Rovers	0–10
Mallow	0–21
Ballyclough	0–06
Liscarroll Churchtown Gaels	1–12

Semi-Finals
Kilshannig	0–05
Mallow	2–18
Charleville	3–10
Liscarroll Churchtown Gaels	1–06

Final
Mallow	0–08
Charleville	3–05

=== Mid Cork JAFC ===
Quarter-Finals
Donoughmore	1–13
Éire Óg	4–07
Kilmichael	2–10
Clondrohid	1–10

Semi-Finals
Aghinagh	1–08
Éire Óg	0–08
Grenagh	0–10
Kilmichael	2–11

Final
Aghinagh	2–12
Kilmichael	1–13

=== Carbery JAFC ===
Barryroe v St Mary’s

=== Cork City JAFC ===
Douglas 2–15

Mayfield 0–10

=== South East JAFC ===
Ballygarvan 0–07

Carrigaline 1–09

=== East Cork JAFC ===
Quarter-Finals
Carrigtwohill	0–08
Carrignavar	1–06
Youghal	5–08
Dungourney	1–09

Semi-Finals
Castlemartyr	0–09
Carrignavar	1–08
Midleton	1–11
Youghal	1–15

Final
Carrignavar	0–16
Youghal	1–09

== County championships ==
=== Quarter-finals ===
31 October 2026 Quarter-final	Carrigaline (Carrigdhoun)	1-08 - 1-14	Douglas (Seandún)	Ted Hanley Memorial Park
	B Corkery-Delaney, (0-5, 2 2pf), L Jordan (1-0), T Cronin, T Vaughan, C Hanratty (0-1 each).	Report	J O'Brien (0-5, 2 2pfs), C O'Keeffe (1-1), H Quilligan (0-3, 2p), P McGrath (0-2), D Reddington, R O'Sullivan, S O'Leary (0-1 each)

31 October 2026 Quarter-final	Aghinagh (Muskerry)	3-14 - 1-09	Carraig na bhFear (Imokilly)	Páirc Dhónaill Uí Cheallacháin
	C Buckley 2-3, L Twohig 0-6 (0-2 f), W Coakley 1-2.	Report	A Bowen 1-0, R Sheehan 0-2, S Whelan 0-2, Colm Murphy 0-2, Cormac Murphy 0-2, C Cooney 0-1, C Hayes 0-1.

8 November 2026 Quarter-final	Castlemagner (Duhallow)	0-09 - 2-10	Barryroe (Carbery)	Whitechurch Grounds
	Cormac O'Sullivan 0-7, B O'Driscoll 0-1, E Magner 0-1.	Report	R O'Donovan 1-5, D Dineen 1-0, O O'Donovan 0-2, S Holland 0-2, L Murphy 0-1.

=== Semi-finals ===
14 November 2026 Semi-final	Charleville (Avondhu)	2-10 - 2-16	Douglas (Seandún)	Grenagh Grounds
	D Butler 1-5 (1 2pt, 1-0 pen, 0-3 f), D Casey 1-1, J Callaghan (0-1 f), C O’Carroll, Z Biggane, D Forde 0-1 each.	Report	J O’Brien 0-6 (1 2pt, 1 2pt f, 0-2 f), H Quilligan 0-4 (2 2pt), D Reddington, M Howell 1-0 each, E O’Flynn (1 2pt f), C O’Keeffe (0-1 f) 0-2 each, O Barry, B Fraher 0-1 each.

15 November 2026 Semi-final	Aghinagh (Muskerry)	0-11 - 2-15 (aet)	Barryroe (Carbery)	Páirc Uí Rinn
	L Twohig 0-4 (1 2pt, 0-1 f), S Corkery, T Morgans, W Coakley, D O’Shea, S Cummins, D McCarthy (0-1 f), TJ Buckley 0-1 each.	Report	R O’Donovan 1-9 (1-0 pen, 1 2pt, 0-2 f, 0-1 45, 0-1 m), O O’Donovan 1-2, L Murphy 0-3, T Ó Buachalla 0-1.

=== Final ===
Final	Douglas (Seandún)	v	Barryroe (Carbery)

== Championship statistics ==
=== Top scorers ===
Rank	Player	Club	Tally	Total	Matches	Average
1	Ryan O'Donovan	Barryroe	2-14	20	2	10.00
2	Jamie O'Brien	Douglas	0-11	11	2	5.50
3	Liam Twohig	Aghinagh	0-10	10	2	5.00
4	Con Buckley	Aghinagh	2-03	9	2	4.50
5	Darren Butler	Charleville	1-05	8	1	8.00
6	Ólan O'Donovan	Barryroe	1-04	7	2	3.50
6	Harry Qulligan	Douglas	0-07	7	2	3.50
6	Cormac O'Sullivan	Castlemagner	0-07	7	1	7.00
9	Chris O'Keeffe	Douglas	1-03	6	2	3.00
9	William Coakley	Aghinagh	1-03	6	2	3.00
