= 2022 Cork Junior A Football Championship =

- Dates: 15 October – 13 November 2022
- Teams: 8
- Sponsor: Bon Secours
- Champions: Kilmurry (5th title); William Ronan (captain); Fionn Warren (captain); Cormac Linehan (manager)
- Runners-up: Cobh; Adam McCarthy (captain)

Tournament statistics
- Matches played: 7
- Goals scored: 18 (2.57 per match)
- Points scored: 110 (15.71 per match)
- Top scorer(s): Mark Lenehan (2–08)

The 2022 Cork Junior A Football Championship was the 124th staging of the Cork Junior A Football Championship since its establishment by the Cork County Board in 1895. The championship ran from 15 October to 13 November 2022.

The final was played on 13 November 2022 at Páirc Uí Chaoimh in Cork, between Kilmurry and Cobh, in what was their first ever meeting in the final. Kilmurry won the match by 1–12 to 0–08 to claim their fifth championship title overall and a first title in 36 years.

Buttevant's Mark Lenehan was the championship's top scorer with 2–08.

== Qualification ==
Division	Championship	Champions	#
Avondhu	North Cork Junior A Football Championship	Buttevant	
Beara	Beara Junior A Football Championship	Urhan	
Carbery	South West Junior A Football Championship	St. James's	
Carrigdhoun	South East Junior A Football Championship	Kinsale	
Duhallow	Duhallow Junior A Football Championship	Cullen	
Imokilly	East Cork Junior A Football Championship	Cobh	
Muskerry	Mid Cork Junior A Football Championship	Kilmurry	
Seandún	City Junior A Football Championship	St. Michael's	

== Divisional Championships ==
=== Duhallow Junior A Football Championship ===
Group A

Pos	Team	Pld	W	D	L	Diff	Pts	Qualification
1	Cullen	2	2	0	0	+1	4	Advance to Knockout Stage
2	Castlemagner	2	1	0	1	−1	2	Advance to Knockout Stage
4	Kiskeam	2	0	0	2	+0	0	

Castlemagner 1–12 – 0–16 Cullen

Group B

Pos	Team	Pld	W	D	L	Diff	Pts	Qualification
1	Kanturk	3	3	0	0	+8	6	Advance to Knockout Stage
2	Lyre	3	2	0	1	+14	4	Advance to Knockout Stage
3	Knocknagree	3	1	0	2	−6	2	
4	Newmarket	3	0	0	3	−16	0	

Lyre 4–14 – 1-07 Newmarket

Kanturk 1–12 – 1-09 Knocknagree

Lyre 1–05 – 1–10 Kanturk

Lyre 2–12 – 1–12 Knocknagree

Knockout Stage

Semi-Finals
Cullen	4–13
Lyre	1–04
Kanturk	0–11
Castlemagner	1–07

Final
Cullen	4–16
Kanturk	1–02

=== North Cork Junior A Football Championship ===
Group A

Pos	Team	Pld	W	D	L	Diff	Pts	Qualification
1	Fermoy	3	2	1	0	+17	5	Advance to Knockout Stage
2	Kilshannig	3	2	0	1	−8	4	Advance to Knockout Stage
3	Clyda Rovers	3	1	0	2	−7	2	
4	Mallow	3	0	1	2	−2	1	

Group B

Pos	Team	Pld	W	D	L	Diff	Pts	Qualification
1	Buttevant	3	3	0	0	+22	6	Advance to Knockout Stage
2	Killavullen	3	2	0	1	+5	4	Advance to Knockout Stage
3	Ballyhooly	3	1	0	2	+7	2	
4	Ballyclough	3	0	0	3	−34	0	

Group C

Pos	Team	Pld	W	D	L	Diff	Pts	Qualification
1	Charleville	2	2	0	0	+28	4	Advance to Knockout Stage
2	Kilworth	2	1	0	1	−5	2	Advance to Knockout Stage
3	Liscarroll Churchtown Gaels	2	0	0	2	−23	0	

Knockout Stage

Quarter-Finals
Buttevant	3–16
Kilshannig	0–02
Killavullen	2–10
Kilworth	2–11

Semi-Finals
Fermoy	0–07
Buttevant	1–14
Charleville	0–15
Kilworth	0–11

Final
Buttevant	1–09
Charleville	1–08

=== Mid Cork Junior A Football Championship ===
Group 1

Pos	Team	Pld	W	D	L	Diff	Pts	Qualification
1	Kilmurry	3	3	0	0	+38	6	Advance to Knockout Stage
2	Kilmichael	3	1	1	1	−4	3	Advance to Knockout Stage
3	Clondrohid	3	1	0	2	−4	2	
4	Dripsey	3	0	1	2	−30	1	

Group 2

Pos	Team	Pld	W	D	L	Diff	Pts	Qualification
1	Canovee	2	2	0	0	+6	4	Advance to Knockout Stage
2	Eire Og	2	1	0	1	+1	2	Advance to Knockout Stage
3	Cill na Martra	2	0	0	2	−7	0	

Group 3

Pos	Team	Pld	W	D	L	Diff	Pts	Qualification
1	Ballincollig	2	1	0	1	+7	2	Advance to Knockout Stage
2	Grenagh	2	1	0	1	−2	2	Advance to Knockout Stage
3	Donoughmore	2	1	0	1	−5	2	

Group 4

Pos	Team	Pld	W	D	L	Diff	Pts	Qualification
1	Inniscarra	2	2	0	0	+8	4	Advance to Knockout Stage
2	Aghinagh	2	1	0	1	+12	2	Advance to Knockout Stage
3	Béal Átha'n Ghaorthaidh	2	0	0	2	−20	0	

Knockout Stage

Quarter-Finals
Kilmurry	0–11
Eire Og	0–04
Canovee	3–08
Grenagh	0–06
Inniscarra	3–18
Kilmichael	0–09
Aghinagh	3–11
Ballincollig	1–15

Semi-Finals
Kilmurry	1–13
Canovee	1–10
Inniscarra	1–11
Aghinagh	1–13

Final
Kilmurry	3–10
Aghinagh	1–08

=== South West Junior A Football Championship ===
Group 1

Pos	Team	Pld	W	D	L	Diff	Pts	Qualification
1	Tadhg Mac Cárthaigh's	3	2	0	1	+1	4	Advance to Knockout Stage
2	Argideen Rangers	3	2	0	1	+0	4	Advance to Knockout Stage
3	Barryroe	3	2	0	1	−1	4	
4	Bandon	3	0	0	3	+0	0	Relegation Playoff

Group 2

Pos	Team	Pld	W	D	L	Diff	Pts	Qualification
1	St Mary's	3	3	0	0	+19	6	Advance to Knockout Stage
2	St. James's	3	2	0	1	+12	4	Advance to Knockout Stage
3	Castlehaven	3	1	0	2	−7	2	
4	St. Colum's	3	0	0	3	−24	0	Relegation Playoff

Group 3

Pos	Team	Pld	W	D	L	Diff	Pts	Qualification
1	Ballinascarthy	3	3	0	0	+24	6	Advance to Knockout Stage
2	Kilmacabea	3	2	0	1	+21	4	Advance to Knockout Stage
3	Kilbrittain	3	1	0	2	−16	2	
4	Clonakilty	3	0	0	3	−29	0	Relegation Playoff

Group 4

Pos	Team	Pld	W	D	L	Diff	Pts	Qualification
1	Randal Og	3	3	0	0	+19	6	Advance to Knockout Stage
2	Carbery Rangers	3	2	0	1	+25	4	Advance to Knockout Stage
3	Newcestown	3	1	0	2	−11	2	
4	Muintir Bháire	3	0	0	3	−33	0	Relegation Playoff

Knockout Stage

Quarter-Finals
Ballinascarthy	0–10
St. James's	2–12
St Mary's	1–13
Kilmacabea	2–09
Randal Og	0–11
Argideen Rangers	1–14
Tadhg Mac Cárthaigh's	0–08
Carbery Rangers	0–05

Semi-Finals
St. James's	2–11
St Mary's	1–11
Argideen Rangers	1–09
Tadhg Mac Cárthaigh's	1–06

Final
St. James's	0–11
Argideen Rangers	0–05

Relegation Playoff

Bandon 2–08 – 1–06 Muintir Bháire

=== City Junior A Football Championship ===
First Round

Brian Dillons 4–12 – 0–13 Whitechurch

Bishopstown 1–08 – 2–12 Delanys

Mayfield 1–19 – 2–18 Douglas

Nemo Rangers 0-07 – 1-09 St Michael's

Passage 8–14 – 0-03 St Vincent's

Second Round

White's Cross 1–06 – 1–15 Mayfield

St Vincent’s 1–06 – 3–14 Whitechurch

Bishopstown 2-06 – 1–17 Nemo Rangers

Third Round

White's Cross 1–05 – 2–11 Delanys

Quarter-Finals

St Michael's 1–11 – 1–08 Whitechurch

Mayfield 4–10 – 2–14 Passage

Nemo Rangers 2–08 – 3-06 Douglas

Brian Dillons 1–10 – 1–08 Delanys

Semi-Finals

Brian Dillons 2-09 – 1–11 Mayfield

Douglas 0-08 – 2–11 St Michael's

Final

Brian Dillons 1–11 – 2–11 St Michael's

=== South East Junior A Football Championship ===
Group 1

Pos	Team	Pld	W	D	L	Diff	Pts	Qualification
1	Kinsale	3	3	0	0	+20	6	Advance to Knockout Stage
2	Carrigaline	3	2	0	1	+9	4	Advance to Knockout Stage
3	Ballymartle	3	1	0	2	−14	2	
3	Tracton	3	0	0	3	−15	0	

Group 2

Pos	Team	Pld	W	D	L	Diff	Pts	Qualification
1	Shamrocks	2	2	0	0	+29	4	Advance to Knockout Stage
2	Valley Rovers	2	1	0	1	−5	2	Advance to Knockout Stage
3	Belgooly	2	0	0	2	−24	0	

Group 3

Pos	Team	Pld	W	D	L	Diff	Pts	Qualification
1	Ballygarvan	2	2	0	0	+28	4	Advance to Knockout Stage
2	Ballinhassig	2	1	0	1	−7	2	Advance to Knockout Stage
3	Courcey Rovers	2	0	0	2	−21	0	

Knockout Stage

Quarter-Finals
Ballygarvan	2–09
Valley Rovers	0–05
Ballinhassig	2–11
Carrigaline	1–07

Semi-Finals
Kinsale	1–10
Ballygarvan	1–09
Shamrocks	2–09
Ballinhassig	2–12

Final
Kinsale	2–15
Ballinhassig	0–04

=== East Cork Junior A Football Championship ===
Group A

Pos	Team	Pld	W	D	L	Diff	Pts	Qualification
1	Cloyne	3	2	0	1	+2	4	Advance to Knockout Stage
2	Bride Rovers	3	2	0	1	−2	4	Advance to Knockout Stage
3	Glenbower Rovers	3	1	0	2	+1	2	
4	Aghada	3	1	0	2	−1	2	

Group B

Pos	Team	Pld	W	D	L	Diff	Pts	Qualification
1	Castlemartyr	3	2	1	0	+2	5	Advance to Knockout Stage
2	Cobh	3	2	0	1	+12	4	Advance to Knockout Stage
3	Carrigtwohill	3	1	1	1	+0	3	
4	Midleton	3	0	0	3	−14	0	

Group C

Pos	Team	Pld	W	D	L	Diff	Pts	Qualification
1	Carrignavar	3	2	1	0	+16	5	Advance to Knockout Stage
2	Youghal	3	2	0	1	−3	4	Advance to Knockout Stage
3	Lisgoold	3	1	0	2	−9	2	
4	Erin's Own	3	0	1	2	−4	1	

Knockout Stage

Quarter-Finals
Cloyne	2–11
Youghal	1–12
Bride Rovers	0–07
Cobh	4–08

Semi-Finals
Castlemartyr	4–13
Cloyne	1–16
Carrignavar	0–03
Cobh	2–10

Final
Castlemartyr	2–09
Cobh	4–11

== Fixtures and results ==
=== Bracket ===
Quarter-Finals
St James's (Carbery)	2–07
Kilmurry (Muskerry)	2–10
Kinsale (Carrigdhoun)	1–09
Urhan (Beara)	3–09
Cullen (Duhallow)	0–05
Cobh (Imokilly)	1–05
St Michael's (Seandun)	1–04
Buttevant (Avondhu)	3–09

Semi-Finals
Kilmurry (Muskerry)	1–10
Urhan (Beara)	1–06
Cobh (Imokilly)	2–07
Buttevant (Avondhu)	0–09

Final
Kilmurry (Muskerry)	1–12
Cobh (Imokilly)	0–08

=== Quarter-finals ===
15 October 2022 Quarter-final	St James'	2–07 – 2–10	Kilmurry	St. Mary's Park
	A Hayes 1–2, F Hayes 1–2, J O'Driscoll 0–1, M McCarthy 0–1, A O'Shea 0–1.		P Berhanu 1–1, L Wall 1–0, R Leahy 0–3, T Collins 0–2, W Buckley 0–1, W Ronan 0–1, R Duggan 0–1, P Hinchion 0–1.	Referee: B Coniry (Crosshaven)

15 October 2022 Quarter-final	Kinsale	1–09 – 3–09	Urhan	Sam Maguire Park
	M Murphy 1–2, B Coughlan 0–4, J Murphy 0–2, H Sheehan 0–1.		C Harrington 1–6, C Lowney 1–2, D Crowley 1–0, P O'Shea 0–1.	Referee: L O'Shea (Carbery Rangers)

15 October 2022 Quarter-final	Cullen	0–05 – 1–05	Cobh	Mourneabbey Grounds
	L Murphy 0–5 (0-2f, 0–1’45).	Report	D Kearney 1–1, C Spriggs 0–2 (0-1f), D Heelan 0-1f, S Cummins 0–1	Referee: C Murphy (Glanworth)

15 October 2022 Quarter-final	St Michael's	1–04 – 3–09	Buttevant	Grenagh Grounds
	D Cremin 1–1, E Sheehan 0–1, E Buckley 0–1, M Drummond 0–1.		M Lenehan 2–4, R Fowley 1–0, M O'Neill 0–2, K Bowles 0–1, C Hanlon 0–1, K O'Keeffe 0–1.	Referee: D Carroll (Kanturk)

=== Semi-finals ===
29 October 2022 Semi-final	Kilmurry	1–10 – 1–06	Urhan	Wolfe Tone Park
	P Berhanu 1–0, T Collins 0–3, L Wall 0–3, J O'Mullane 0–2, D McCarthy 0–1, K Kelleher 0–1.		C Lowney 1–5, P O'Shea 0–1.

29 October 2022 Semi-final	Cobh	2–07 – 0–09	Buttevant	Moore Park
	C Spriggs (0–5, 3f), S Hilliard (1–0), C Farrell (1–0), N O'Connell (0–1), D Heelan (0–1).	Report	M O'Neill 0–5 (0-4f), M Lenahan (0–4).	Referee: C Nolan (Bishopstown)

=== Final ===
13 November 2022 Final	Kilmurry	1–12 – 0–08	Cobh	Páirc Uí Chaoimh
	L Wall 0–5 (1f), P Berhanu 1–1, R Duggan 0–2, L Aisling, James O’Mullane, T Collins (f), R Leahy 0–1 each.	Report	N O’Connell 0–3, F Duggan 0–2 (0–1 f), C Spriggs (f), S Hilliard, A Lynch 0–1 each.	Referee: A Whelton (Clonakilty)

== Championship Statistics ==
=== Top scorers ===
Overall

Rank	Player	Club	Tally	Total	Matches	Average
1	Mark Lenehan	Buttevant	2–08	14	2	7.00
2	Conor Lowney	Urhan	2–07	13	2	6.50
3	Pádraig Berhanu	Kilmurry	3–02	11	3	3.66
3	Liam Wall	Kilmurry	1–08	11	3	3.66
5	Conchubhar Harrington	Urhan	1–06	9	2	4.50

In a single game

Rank	Player	Club	Tally	Total	Opposition
1	Mark Lenehan	Buttevant	2–04	10	St. Michael's
2	Conchubhar Harrington	Urhan	1–06	9	Kinsale
3	Conor Lowney	Urhan	1–05	8	Kilmurry
4	Aaron Hayes	St. James'	1–02	5	Kilmurry
4	Frank Hayes	St. James'	1–02	5	Kilmurry
4	Michael Murphy	Kinsale	1–02	5	Urhan
4	Conor Lowney	Urhan	1–02	5	Kinsale
4	Luke Murphy	Cullen	0–05	5	Cobh
4	Cian Spriggs	Cobh	0–05	5	Buttevant
4	Michael O'Neill	Buttevant	0–05	5	Cobh
4	Liam Wall	Kilmurry	0–05	5	Cobh
