= 2021 Cork Junior A Football Championship =

- Dates: 6 November – 27 November 2021
- Teams: 8
- Sponsor: Bon Secours
- Champions: Boherbue (1st title); Adrian Murphy (captain); Conor O'Riordan (manager)
- Runners-up: Ballinahssig; Diarmuid O'Sullivan (captain); Cathal Daly (manager)

Tournament statistics
- Matches played: 7
- Goals scored: 20 (2.86 per match)
- Points scored: 132 (18.86 per match)
- Top scorer(s): Diarmuid O'Sullivan (2–25)

The 2021 Cork Junior A Football Championship is scheduled to be the 123rd staging of the Cork Junior A Football Championship since its establishment by the Cork County Board in 1895. The championship began on 6 November 2021.

== Qualification ==
Division	Championship	Champions	#
Avondhu	North Cork Junior A Football Championship	Kilworth	
Beara	Beara Junior A Football Championship	Urhan	
Carbery	South West Junior A Football Championship	Tadhg Mac Carthaigh	
Carrigdhoun	South East Junior A Football Championship	Ballinhassig	
Duhallow	Duhallow Junior A Football Championship	Boherbue	
Imokilly	East Cork Junior A Football Championship	Bride Rovers	
Muskerry	Mid Cork Junior A Football Championship	Aghinagh	
Seandún	City Junior A Football Championship	Douglas	

=== Duhallow Junior A Football Championship ===
Group 1

Pos	Team	Pld	W	D	L	Pts	Qualification
1	Boherbue	2	2	0	0	4	Advance to Knockout Stage
2	Lyre	2	1	0	1	2	Advance to Knockout Stage
4	Kiskeam	2	0	0	2	0	

Group 2

Pos	Team	Pld	W	D	L	Pts	Qualification
1	Cullen	2	2	0	0	4	Advance to Knockout Stage
2	Castlemagner	2	1	0	1	2	Advance to Knockout Stage
3	Knocknagree	2	0	0	2	0	

Knockout Stage

Semi-Finals
Cullen	1–20
Lyre	0–07
Boherbue	2–13
Castlemagner	2–04

Final
Cullen	1–10
Boherbue	2–09

== Results ==
=== Bracket ===
Quarter-Finals
Douglas (Seandun)	1–12
Kilworth (Avondhu)	2–08
Tadhg Mac Carthaigh (Carbery)	2–09
Ballinhassig (Carrigdhoun)	2–15
Urhan (Beara)	0–10
Bride Rovers (Imokilly)	1–06
Boherbue (Duhallow)	4–14
Aghinagh (Muskerry)	0–07

Semi-Finals
Douglas (Seandun)	1–07
Ballinhassig (Carrigdhoun)	1–08
Urhan (Beara)	0–11
Boherbue (Duhallow)	1–09

Final
Ballinhassig (Carrigdhoun)	2–08
Boherbue (Duhallow)	3–08

=== Quarter-finals ===
6 November 2021 Quarter-final	Douglas	1–12 – 2–08	Kilworth	Mourneabbey Grounds
	A Murray 1–0, E O’Sullivan 0–3 (2 ‘45’), A Cotter 0–3 (2f), M Dolan 0–2, D Curtin 0–1, J Farrell 0-1f, F Sheehan 0–1, A Cantwell 0–1.	Report	B Sheehan 1–4 (0-1f), L Coffey 1–0, E Carey 0–2, N McNamara 0–1, L Whelan 0–1.	Referee: P O' Sullivan

6 November 2021 Quarter-final	Urhan	0–10 – 1–06	Bride Rovers	Páirc Uinsinn
	C Lowney 0–6 (4f, 1 45); S Shea 0–2; C O’Sullivan, A O’Donoghue 0–1 each.	Report	S Ahern 1–0; C Barry 0-3f; C Hogan (1f, 1 45) 0–2; P O’Flynn 0–1.	Referee: A Whelton

7 November 2021 Quarter-final	Ballinhassig	2–15 – 2–09	Tadhg Mac Carthaigh	Charlie Hurley Park
	D O'Sullivan 0–11, C Tyers 2–1, C Grainger 0–2, I Grainger 0–1.		B O'Driscoll 1–3, C McCarthy 0–4, P Burke 1–0, E O'Neill 0–1, C O'Driscoll 0–1.	Referee: P Finnegan

9 November 2021 Quarter-final	Boherbue	4–14 – 0–07	Aghinagh	Pairc Ui Rinn
	J O’Connor 0–7 (2f), G O’Sullivan 1–2, L Moynihan 1–1, J Corkery 1–0, D Sheehan 1–0, D McCarthy 0-2f, Alan O’Connor 0–1, B Herlihy 0–1.	Report	L Twohig 0–6 (3f), D Ambrose 0–1.	Referee: B Walsh

=== Semi-finals ===
13 November 2021 Semi-final	Douglas	1–07 – 1–08	Ballinhassig	Ballyanley Grounds
	A Cotter 1–3, M Dolan 0–2, A Cantwell 0–1, B Powter 0–1.		D O'Sullivan 1–7, C Tyers 0–1.

16 November 2021 Semi-final	Urhan	0–11 – 1–09	Boherbue	Cloughduv Grounds
	C Lowney 0–3 (0–2 f, 0–1 45), P O’Shea 0–3 (0–1 f), J O’Shea 0–2, C Harrington 0–2, C O’Sullivan 0–1.	Report	J O’Connor 1–2 (0–1 f), D McCarthy 0–3 (0–2 f), L Moynihan, J Corkery, R O’Connor, A O’Connor 0-1each.	Referee: P O'Leary (Kilmurry)

=== Final ===
27 November 2021 Final	Ballinhassig	2–08 – 3–08	Boherbue	Pairc Ui Chaoimh
	Diarmuid O’Sullivan 1–7 (1–0 pen, 0–5 f), E Finn 1–0, D Delea 0–1.	Report	D McCarthy 1–5 (0–3 f), Alan O’Connor 1–2, J O’Connor 1–0 (1–0 penalty), and Andrew O’Connor 0–1.	Referee: P O'Leary (Cloughduv)

== Championship statistics ==
=== Top scorers ===
Overall

Rank	Player	Club	Tally	Total	Matches	Average
1	Diarmuid O'Sullivan	Ballinhassig	2–25	31	3	10.33
2	Jerry O'Connor	Boherbue	2–09	15	3	5.00
3	Denis McCarthy	Boherbue	1–10	13	3	4.33
4	Andrew Cotter	Douglas	1–06	9	2	4.50
4	Conor Lowney	Urhan	0–09	9	2	4.50

In a single game

Rank	Player	Club	Tally	Total	Opposition
1	Diarmuid O'Sullivan	Ballinhassig	0–11	11	Tadhg Mac Carthaigh
2	Diarmuid O'Sullivan	Ballinhassig	1–07	10	Douglas
2	Diarmuid O'Sullivan	Ballinhassig	1–07	10	Boherbue
4	Denis McCarthy	Boherbue	1–05	8	Ballinhassig
5	Cillian Tyers	Ballinhassig	2–01	7	Tadhg Mac Carthaigh
5	Brian Sheehan	Kilworth	1–04	7	Douglas
5	Jerry O'Connor	Boherbue	0–07	7	Aghinagh
8	Brian O'Driscoll	Tadhg Mac Carthaigh	1–03	6	Ballinhassig
8	Andrew Cotter	Douglas	1–03	6	Ballinhassig
8	Conor Lowney	Urhan	0–06	6	Bride Rovers
8	Liam Twohig	Aghinagh	0–06	6	Boherbue
