= 2023 Cork Junior A Football Championship =

- Dates: 5 November – 26 November 2023
- Teams: 7
- Sponsor: Bon Secours
- Champions: Canovee (4th title); James Moynihan (captain); John O'Brien (manager)
- Runners-up: Mayfield; Dave Malone (captain); Maurice Barry (manager)

Tournament statistics
- Matches played: 6
- Goals scored: 25 (4.17 per match)
- Points scored: 125 (20.83 per match)
- Top scorer(s): Jack Kelleher (0–19)

The 2023 Cork Junior A Football Championship was the 125th staging of the Cork Junior A Football Championship since its establishment by the Cork County Board in 1895. The championship ran from 5 November to 26 November 2023.

The final was played on 26 November 2023 at Páirc Uí Rinn in Cork, between Canovee and Mayfield, in what was their first ever meeting in the final. Canovee won the match by 4–14 to 1–11 to claim their fourth championship title overall and a first title in 16 years.

Canovee's Jack Kelleher was the championship's top scorer with 0–19.

== Qualification ==
Division	Championship	Champions	#
Avondhu	North Cork Junior A Football Championship	Killavullen	
Carbery	South West Junior A Football Championship	Barryroe	
Carrigdhoun	South East Junior A Football Championship	Ballygarvan	
Duhallow	Duhallow Junior A Football Championship	Castlemagner	
Imokilly	East Cork Junior A Football Championship	Lisgoold	
Muskerry	Mid Cork Junior A Football Championship	Canovee	
Seandún	City Junior A Football Championship	Mayfield	

== Divisional championships ==
=== Duhallow Junior A Football Championship ===
Group Stage

Pos	Team	Pld	W	D	L	Diff	Pts	Qualification
1	Castlemagner	5	5	0	0	+50	10	Advance to Knockout Stage
2	Lyre	5	3	0	2	+6	6	Advance to Knockout Stage
3	Kilbrin	5	2	1	2	+10	5	Advance to Knockout Stage
4	Knocknagree	5	2	0	3	−4	4	Advance to Knockout Stage
5	Newmarket	4	1	0	3	−15	2	
6	Kanturk	4	0	1	3	−47	1	

Round 1

Castlemagner 3–10 – 0-09 Lyre

Knocknagree 0–20 – 1–07 Kanturk

Kilbrin 3–12 – 0–08 Newmarket

Round 2

Castlemagner 3–17 – 1–02 Kanturk

Lyre 1–10 – 1-06 Kilbrin

Knocknagree scr – w/o Newmarket

Round 3

Castlemagner 5–11 – 0-07 Knocknagree

Kilbrin 1-08 – 3–02 Kanturk

Lyre 0–12 – 0–10 Newmarket

Round 4

Lyre 2–17 – 0-07 Kanturk

Kilbrin 2-09 – 1–11 Knocknagree

Castlemagner w/o – scr. Newmarket

Round 5

Castlemagner w/o – scr. Kilbrin

Lyre 1–07 – 2–10 Knocknagree

Knockout Stage

Semi-Finals
Castlemagner	5–09
Kilbrin	2–02
Lyre	1–07
Knocknagree	1–11

Final
Castlemagner	1–14
Knocknagree	0–07

=== North Cork Junior A Football Championship ===
Group A

Pos	Team	Pld	W	D	L	Diff	Pts	Qualification
1	Clyda Rovers	3	3	0	0	+14	6	Advance to Knockout Stage
2	Mallow	3	2	0	1	+9	4	Advance to Knockout Stage
3	Kilshannig	3	1	0	2	−7	2	
4	Fermoy	3	0	0	3	−16	0	

Group B

Pos	Team	Pld	W	D	L	Diff	Pts	Qualification
1	Killavullen	2	2	0	0	+14	4	Advance to Knockout Stage
2	Charleville	2	1	0	1	+12	2	Advance to Knockout Stage
3	Ballyclough	2	0	0	2	−26	0	

Group C

Pos	Team	Pld	W	D	L	Diff	Pts	Qualification
1	Ballyhooly	2	1	0	1	+6	2	Advance to Knockout Stage
2	Liscarroll Churchtown Gaels	2	1	0	1	+1	2	Advance to Knockout Stage
3	Kilworth	2	1	0	1	−7	2	

Knockout stage

Quarter-finals

Charleville 1-09 – 0-03 Clyda Rovers

Liscarroll Churchtown Gaels 2–15 – 2-05 Mallow

Semi-finals

Ballyhooly 1–07 – 2–11 Charleville

Killavullen 1–15 – 1–05 Liscarroll Churchtown Gaels

Final

Charleville 0–06 – 0–14 Killavullen

=== Mid Cork Junior A Football Championship ===
==== Group 1 ====
Pos	Team	Pld	W	D	L	Diff	Pts	Qualification
1	Inniscarra	3	3	0	0	+31	6	Advance to Knockout Stage
2	Grenagh	3	2	0	1	+10	4	Advance to Knockout Stage
3	Blarney	3	1	0	2	−20	2	
4	Donoughmore	3	0	0	3	−21	0	

==== Group 2 ====
Pos	Team	Pld	W	D	L	Diff	Pts	Qualification
1	Canovee	3	3	0	0	+47	6	Advance to Knockout Stage
2	Kilmichael	3	2	0	1	−17	4	Advance to Knockout Stage
3	Ballincollig	3	1	0	2	−8	2	
4	Dripsey	3	0	0	3	−22	0	

==== Group 3 ====
Pos	Team	Pld	W	D	L	Diff	Pts	Qualification
1	Éire Óg	3	2	1	0	+19	5	Advance to Knockout Stage
2	Aghinagh	3	2	1	0	+15	5	Advance to Knockout Stage
3	Béal Átha'n Ghaorthaidh	3	1	0	2	−6	2	
4	Clondrohid	3	0	0	3	−28	0	

==== Knockout stage ====
Quarter-finals

Aghinagh 1–10 – 0–12 Grenagh

Éire Óg 1-09 – 0–06 Kilmichael

Semi-finals

Canovee 0–14 – 0-04 Aghinagh

Inniscarra 1-09 – 0–08 Éire Óg

Final

Canovee 1–15 – 2-06 Inniscarra

=== City Junior A Football Championship ===
Round 1

Delaney Rovers 1–13 – 0–10 Whitechurch

Douglas 1–11 – 1-04 Brian Dillons

Nemo Rangers 0–12 – 0–10 White's Cross

Bishopstown 2–13 – 2–15 Mayfield

Round 2

Passage West 1–12 – 3-07 Brian Dillons

Bishopstown 3–10 – 2–11 White's Cross

Quarter-finals

Passage West 1-08 – 0-04 Whitechurch

Nemo Rangers 1–19 – 0–08 Bishopstown

Delaney Rovers 0–11 – 3–12 Mayfield

Douglas 6–15 – 3-05 Brian Dillons

Semi-finals

Passage West 0–06 – 2-08 Nemo Rangers

Mayfield 4-08 – 3-05 Douglas

Final

Nemo Rangers 1–07 – 3-09 Mayfield

=== South East Junior A Football Championship ===
==== Group 1 ====
Pos	Team	Pld	W	D	L	Diff	Pts	Qualification
1	Ballygarvan	3	2	1	0	+24	5	Advance to Knockout Stage
2	Shamrocks	3	2	0	1	−2	4	Advance to Knockout Stage
3	Carrigaline	3	1	0	2	−4	2	
4	Ballymartle	3	0	1	2	−18	1	

==== Group 2 ====
Pos	Team	Pld	W	D	L	Diff	Pts	Qualification
1	Ballinhassig	2	1	1	0	+10	3	Advance to Knockout Stage
2	Valley Rovers	2	1	1	0	+9	3	Advance to Knockout Stage
3	Courcey Rovers	2	0	0	2	−19	0	

=== Knockout stage ===
Semi-Finals
Ballygarvan	2–10
Valley Rovers	1–09
Ballinhassig	2–14
Shamrocks	1–07

Final
Ballygarvan	1–15
Ballinhassig	1–05

=== East Cork Junior A Football Championship ===
Group A

Pos	Team	Pld	W	D	L	Diff	Pts	Qualification
1	Midleton	3	2	0	1	+16	4	Advance to Knockout Stage
2	Bride Rovers	3	2	0	1	−1	4	Advance to Knockout Stage
3	Castlemartyr	3	2	0	1	−8	4	
4	Youghal	3	0	0	3	−7	0	

Group B

Pos	Team	Pld	W	D	L	Diff	Pts	Qualification
1	Aghada	3	3	0	0	+15	6	Advance to Knockout Stage
2	Lisgoold	3	2	0	1	+3	4	Advance to Knockout Stage
3	Cloyne	3	1	0	2	−11	2	
4	Glenbower Rovers	3	0	0	3	−7	0	Advance to relegation playoff

Group C

Pos	Team	Pld	W	D	L	Diff	Pts	Qualification
1	Fr. O'Neill's	3	3	0	0	+30	6	Advance to Knockout Stage
2	Carrignavar	3	2	0	1	+9	4	Advance to Knockout Stage
3	Carrigtwohill	3	1	0	2	−8	2	
4	Erin's Own	3	0	0	3	−31	0	Advance to relegation playoff

=== Knockout stage ===
Quarter-Finals
Midleton	1–08
Lisgoold	1–10
Carrignavar	3–12
Bride Rovers	1–10

Semi-Finals
Fr. O'Neill's	2–06
Lisgoold	2–08
Aghada	0–10
Carrignavar	2–10

Final
Lisgoold	2–09
Carrignavar	0–10

==== Relegation playoff ====
Glenbower Rovers 0–06 – 9-08 Erin's Own

== Fixtures and results ==
=== Bracket ===
Quarter-Finals
Killavullen (Avondhu)	1–09
Ballygarvan (Carrigdhoun)	1–10
Canovee (Muskerry)	5–13
Lisgoold (Imokilly)	0–06
Barryroe (Carbery)	1–11
Castlemagner (Duhallow)	2–10

Semi-Finals
Ballygarvan (Carrigdhoun)	2–13
Mayfield (Seandun)	3–11
Canovee (Muskerry)	4–11
Castlemagner (Duhallow)	1–06

Final
Mayfield (Seandun)	1–11
Canovee (Muskerry)	4–14

=== Quarter-finals ===
5 November 2023 Quarter-final	Barryroe	1–11 – 2–10	Castlemagner	Castle Grounds
	J O’Brien 1–0, R O’Donovan (0–2 f), A McSweeney 0–3 each, O O’Donovan 0–2, C Dineen, D McCarthy, D Ó Buachalla 0–1 each.	Report	E Magner 2–1, D Linehan 0–4 (0–3 f), K Holland 0–2 (0–1 f), S Cronin, D O’Sullivan, C O’Sullivan 0–1 each.	Referee: B Sweeney (Erin's Own)

5 November 2023 Quarter-final	Killavullen	1–09 – 1–10	Ballygarvan	Páirc Uí Rinn
	E Birchall 0–7 f, P Looney 1–2.	Report	E O’Connor 0–5 (0–4 f), R O’Halloran 1–2, M Kennefick, P O’Halloran, S Buckley 0–1 each.

5 November 2023 Quarter-final	Canovee	5–13 – 0–06	Lisgoold	Páirc Uí Rinn
	J Kelleher 0–5 (0–2 f), J Moynihan, D Cronin 1–1 each, E Lehane, M Healy, D Moynihan 1–0 each, C Dodd (1 65), D McMahon 0–2 each, C O’Neill, B McNabola 0–1 each.	Report	J Cashman 0–3 (0–1 f), M Hegarty 0–2, C Scannell 0–1.	Referee: J Forbes (Dohenys)

- Mayfield received a bye in this round.

=== Semi-finals ===
12 November 2023 Semi-final	Canovee	4–11 – 1–06	Castlemagner	Páirc Uí Rinn
	J Kelleher 0–8 (0–2 f), C O’Neill 2–0, B McNabola, P O’Leary 1–0 each, J Moynihan, M Healy, J Kelleher 0–1 each.	Report	D Linehan 0–4 (0–3 f), Cormac O’Sullivan 1–0, J Cott 0–2.	Referee: C Maher (Buttevant)

12 November 2023 Semi-final	Mayfield	3–11 – 2–13	Ballygarvan	Páirc Uí Rinn
	P Condon 1–5 (0–3 f), D O’Neill, N Kelly 1–2 each, D O’Donovan, K Punch 0–1 each.	Report	E O’Connor 1–2, D Mackey 0–4, N Dowd 1–0, S Fenton 0–2, M Kennefick, K Lyons, G White (f), D O’Mahony, M O’Mahony 0–1 each.

=== Final ===
26 November 2023 Final	Canovee	4–14 – 1–11	Mayfield	Páirc Uí Rinn
	D McMahon 3–0, J Kelleher 0–6 (0–3 f), J Moynihan 1–0 pen, D Cronin, C Dodd, C O’Neill 0–2 each, E Dodd, P O’Leary 0–1 each.	Report	P Condon 0–8 (0–5 f), J Courtney 1–0, D O’Donovan, D O’Neill, D Lucey 0–1 each.	Referee: L O'Shea (Carbery Rangers)

== Championship statistics ==
=== Top scorers ===
Overall

Rank	Player	County	Tally	Total	Matches	Average
1	Jack Kelleher	Canovee	0–19	19	3	6.33
2	Paul Condon	Mayfield	1–13	16	2	8.00
3	Darragh McMahon	Canovee	3–02	11	3	3.66
4	Evan O'Connor	Ballygarvan	1–07	10	2	5.00
5	Conor O'Neill	Canovee	2–03	9	3	3.00
6	James Moynihan	Canovee	2–02	8	3	2.33
6	Danny Linehan	Castlemagner	0–08	8	2	4.00
8	Evan Magner	Castlemagner	2–01	7	2	3.50
8	Eoin Birchall	Killavullen	0–07	7	1	7.00
10	Dara Cronin	Canovee	1–03	6	3	2.00
10	Dave O'Neill	Mayfield	1–03	6	2	3.00

Single game

Rank	Player	Club	Tally	Total	Opposition
1	Darragh McMahon	Canovee	3–00	9	Mayfield
2	Paul Condon	Mayfield	1–05	8	Ballygarvan
2	Paul Condon	Mayfield	0–08	8	Canovee
2	Jack Kelleher	Canovee	0–08	8	Castlemagner
5	Evan Magner	Castlemagner	2–01	7	Barryroe
5	Eoin Birchall	Killavullen	0–07	7	Ballygarvan
7	Conor O'Neill	Canovee	2–00	6	Castlemagner
7	Jack Kelleher	Canovee	0–06	6	Mayfield
7	Pádraig Looney	Killavullen	1–02	5	Ballygarvan
7	Nicky Kelly	Mayfield	1–02	5	Ballygarvan
7	Dave O'Neill	Mayfield	1–02	5	Ballygarvan
7	Evan O'Connor	Ballygarvan	1–02	5	Mayfield
7	Ray O'Halloran	Ballygarvan	1–02	5	Killavullen
7	Evan O'Connor	Ballygarvan	0–05	5	Killavullen
7	Jack Kelleher	Canovee	0–05	5	Lisgoold
