= 2019 Cork Junior A Football Championship =

- Dates: 15 September – 10 November 2019
- Teams: 16
- Sponsor: The Echo
- Champions: Kilshannig (3rd title); Killian O'Hanlon (captain); Richie Ryan (manager)
- Runners-up: St. James's; Joe O'Sullivan (captain); Alan O'Shea (manager)

Tournament statistics
- Matches played: 15
- Goals scored: 32 (2.13 per match)
- Points scored: 291 (19.4 per match)
- Top scorer(s): Alan O'Shea (0–17)

The 2019 Cork Junior A Football Championship was the 121st staging of the Cork Junior A Football Championship since its establishment by the Cork County Board in 1895. The championship draw took place on 2 September 2019. The championship began on 15 September 2019 and ended on 10 November 2019.

On 10 November 2019, Kilshannig won the championship after a 0–22 to 0–11 defeat of St James' in the final at Páirc Uí Rinn. This was their third championship title overall and their first title since 1996.

St James' Alan O'Shea was the championship's top scorer with 0–17.

== Qualification ==
Division	Championship	Champions	Runners-up
Avondhu	North Cork Junior A Football Championship	Kilshannig	Kilworth
Beara	Beara Junior A Football Championship	Urhan	Garnish
Carbery	South West Junior A Football Championship	St James'	Ballinascarthy
Carrigdhoun	South East Junior A Football Championship	Ballinhassig	Ballymartle
Duhallow	Duhallow Junior A Football Championship	Boherbue	Lyre
Imokilly	East Cork Junior A Football Championship	Erin's Own	Cobh
Muskerry	Mid Cork Junior A Football Championship	Iveleary	Aghinagh
Seandún	City Junior A Football Championship	St Michael's	Passage

== Results ==
=== Round 1 ===
15 September 2019 Round 1	Ballinhassig	2–11 – 0–05	Garnish	Sam Maguire Park
	F O'Leary 0–6, C Tyers 1–1, S Coleman 1–0, P Coomey 0–1, S Mulligan 0–1, C Reynolds 0–1, T Madden 0–1.		BT O'Sullivan 0–2, F O'Sullivan 0–1, P O'Neill 0–1, R O'Driscoll 0–1.

15 September 2019 Round 1	Urhan	1–06 – 1–10	Ballymartle	Sam Maguire Park
	C Lowney 1–0, J O'Neill 0–3, M McCarthy 0–2, C O'Shea 0–1.		K McCarthy 0–4, J McCarthy 1–0, R Cahalane 0–2, D Edmonds 0–1, D O'Leary 0–1, S Cummins 0–1, E Kelly 0–1.

15 September 2019 Round 1	Boherbue	1–11 – 1–09	Aghinagh	Duggan Park
	J Corkery 1–3, J O'Connor 0–3, J O'Sullivan 0–3, D o'Connor 0–1, CJ O'Sullivan 0–1.		L Twohig 0–6, M Corkery 1–0, A Twomey 0–2, D Corkery 0–1.

15 September 2019 Round 1	Iveleary	2–20 – 0–07	Lyre	Duggan Park
	C Óg Jones 1–7, C O'Leary 1–4, B Cronin 0–3, C Galvin 0–1, A O'Donovan 0–1, S O'Riordan 0–1, K Manning 0–1, D O'Sullivan 0–1, G McSweeney 0–1.		D Roche 0–4, T Murphy 0–1, C O'Donoghue 0–1, J Sexton 0–1.

15 September 2019 Round 1	Kilshannig	4–17 – 0–03	Passage	Bride Rovers Park
	J Kearney 1–3, E O'Hanlon 1–1, K O'Hanlon 0–4, K Twomey 0–4, J Murphy 1–0, J Twomey 1–0, D O'Sullivan 0–3, K Flynn 0–1, B O'Shea 0–1.		A Kidney 0–2, J Kind 0–1.

28 September 2019 Round 1	St James'	2–17 – 0–02	Cobh	Brinny Sportsfield
	F Hayes 1–6, J O'Driscoll 1–1, A O'Shea 0–3, P O'Sullivan 0–1, A Hayes 0–1, K O'Brien 0–1, M Evans 0–1, S O'Reilly 0–1, James O'Sullivan 0–1, MD McCarthy 0–1.		D Higgins 0–1, C Spriggs 0–1.

5 October 2019 Round 1	Erin's Own	0–08 – 0–09	Ballinascarthy	Brinny Sportsfield
	C Linehan 0–4, E Murphy 0–2, M Carroll 0–1, J Carroll 0–1.		C Cullinane 0–3, B Murray 0–2, D Harte 0–2, J Ryan 0–1, D McCarthy 0–1.

23 October 2019 Round 1	St Michael's	7–13 – 1–08	Kilworth	Mourne Abbey
	L Grainger 3–0, R Cotter 2–3, M O'Keeffe 1–4, E o'Donovan 1–3, A Nolan 0–3.		W Condon 1–1, N McNamara 0–2, L Whelan 0–2, S Keane 0–1, P Moakley 0–1, E Carey 0–1.

=== Quarter-finals ===
29 September 2019 Quarter-final	Ballinhassig	0–04 – 2–10	Kilshannig	CArraig na bhFear Sportsfield
	F O'Leary 0–3, S O'Neill 0–1.		D Twomey 1–1, J Kearney 1–1, K Twomey 0–3, K O'Hanlon 0–2, B O'Shea 0–2, C O'Shea 0–1.

5 October 2019 Quarter-final	St James'	1–11 – 0–12	Boherbue	Jack Fitzgerald Memorial Park
	A O'Shea 0–5, F Hayes 1–1, MD McCarthy 0–1, M Evans 0–1, D O'Donovan 0–1, S O'Reilly 0–1, James O'Sullivan 0–1.		J O'Connor 0–5, J Corkery 0–3, D McCarthy 0–2, A Murphy 0–1, G O'Sullivan 0–1.

12 October 2019 Quarter-final	Ballinascarthy	0–06 – 3–08	Iveleary	Páirc Naomh Eoin
	D McCarthy 0–3, B Murray 0–1, D O'Brien 0–1, C Cullinane 0–1.		B O'Leary 2–1, B Cronin 1–1, C Óg Jones 0–2, C Vaughan 0–2, S O'Riordan 0–2.

26 October 2019 Quarter-final	Ballymartle	0–05 – 1–05	St Michael's	St Vincent's Park
	D O'Leary 0–4, C Healy 0–1.		E O'Donovan 1–2, A Nolan 0–2, R Cotter 0–1.

=== Semi-finals ===
26 October 2019 Semi-final	Iveleary	1–09 – 1–11	Kilshannig	Coachford Sportsfield
	D O’Sullivan 1–0, E O’Hanlon 0–3 f, K O’Hanlon 0–2, D Twomey 0–2, K Twomey 0–1 f, J Twomey, C McMahon, B Guerin 0–1 each.	Report	C Vaughan 1–5 (0–5 f), B Cronin 0–3 (0–2 f), C Óg Jones 0–1.

3 November 2019 Semi-final	St James'	1–12 – 0–09	St Michael's	Ovens Sportsfield
	A O’Shea 0–5 (5f); A Hayes 1–1; MD McCarthy 0–3; James O’Sullivan, Joe O’Sullivan, F Hayes 0–1 each.	Report	L Grainger 0–4; R Cotter 0–2 (1f); E O’Donovan, M O’Keeffe, A Nolan 0–1 each.

=== Final ===
10 November 2019 Final	Kilshannig	0–22 – 0–11	St James'	Páirc Uí Rinn
	C McMahon 0–6, K O’Hanlon 0–4, K Twomey 0–4 (0–3 f), E O’Hanlon 0–3, E O’Sullivan, B Guerin, C O’Shea and J Twomey 0–1 each.	Report	A O’Shea 0–4, 0–2 f, F Hayes 0–2, K O’Brien, M Evans, M McCarthy (D), P O’Sullivan, S O’Reilly 0–1 each.	Referee: M Maher (St. Finbarr's)

== Championship statistics ==
=== Top scorers ===
Overall

Rank	Player	Club	Tally	Total	Matches	Average
1	Alan O'Shea	St James'	0–17	17	4	4.25
2	Frank Hayes	St James'	2–10	16	4	4.00
3	Liam Grainger	St Michael's	3–04	13	2	6.50
3	Chris Óg Jones	Iveleary	1–10	13	3	4.33
5	Robbie Cotter	St Michael's	2–06	12	3	4.00
5	Eoin O'Donovan	St Michael's	2–06	12	3	4.00
5	Killian O'Hanlon	Kilshannig	0–12	12	4	4.00
5	Kieran Twomey	Kilshannig	0–12	12	4	4.00
9	Jack Kearney	Kilshannig	2–04	10	4	2.50
9	Cathal Vaughan	Iveleary	1–08	10	2	5.00
9	Éanna O'Hanlon	Kilshannig	1–07	10	4	2.50

In a single game

Rank	Player	Club	Tally	Total	Opposition
1	Chris Óg Jones	Iveleary	1–07	10	Lyre
2	Liam Grainger	St Michael's	3–00	9	Kilworth
2	Robbie Cotter	St Michael's	2–03	9	Kilworth
2	Frank Hayes	St James'	1–06	9	Cobh
5	Cathal Vaughan	Iveleary	1–05	8	Kilshannig
6	Barry O'Leary	Iveleary	2–01	7	Ballinascarthy
6	Conor O'Leary	Iveleary	1–04	7	Lyre
6	Mark O'Keeffe	St Michael's	1–04	7	Kilworth
9	John Corkery	Boherbue	1–03	6	Aghinagh
9	Jack Kearney	Kilshannig	1–03	6	Passage
9	Eoin O'Donovan	St Michael's	1–03	6	Kilworth
9	Fintan O'Leary	Ballinhassig	0–06	6	Garnish
9	Liam Twohig	Aghinagh	0–06	6	Boherbue
9	Conor McMahon	Kilshannig	0–06	6	St James'
