= 2017 Cork Junior A Football Championship =

119th staging of the Cork Junior A Football Championship

- Dates: 9 September – 29 October 2017
- Teams: 16
- Sponsor: Evening Echo
- Champions: Knocknagree (3rd title); Matthew Dilworth (captain); John Fintan Daly (manager)
- Runners-up: Erin's Own; Kieran Murphy (captain); Brendan Lambe (manager)

Tournament statistics
- Matches played: 16
- Goals scored: 31 (1.94 per match)
- Points scored: 346 (21.63 per match)
- Top scorer(s): Anthony O'Connor (2–28)

The 2017 Cork Junior A Football Championship was the 119th staging of the Cork Junior A Football Championship since its establishment by the Cork County Board. The draw for the 2017 fixtures took place on 11 December 2016. It was the first championship to include beaten divisional finalists. The championship ran from 9 September to 29 October 2017.

The final was played on 29 October 2017 at Páirc Uí Rinn in Cork, between Knocknagree and Erin's Own, in what was their first ever meeting in the final. Knocknagree won the match by 2–19 to 2–10 to claim their third championship title overall and a first title in 26 years.

Knocknagree's Anthony O'Connor was the championship's top scorer with 2–28.

== Qualification ==
Division	Championship	Champions	Runners-up
Avondhu	North Cork Junior A Football Championship	Buttevant	Kilworth
Beara	Beara Junior A Football Championship	Garnish	Urhan
Carbery	South West Junior A Football Championship	Kilmacabea	Kilbrittain
Carrigdhoun	South East Junior A Football Championship	Valley Rovers	Belgooly
Duhallow	Duhallow Junior A Football Championship	Boherbue	Knocknagree
Imokilly	East Cork Junior A Football Championship	Erin's Own	Glenbower Rovers
Muskerry	Mid Cork Junior A Football Championship	Kilmurry	Iveleary
Seandún	City Junior A Football Championship	Delaney Rovers	White's Cross

== Results ==
=== First round ===
9 September 2017 First round	Boherbue	4–10 – 0–04	Urhan	Inchigeelagh Grounds
	R Moynihan 2–1, J O'Connor 1–4, M O'Gorman 1–0, J Casey 0–1, CJ O'Sullivan 0–1, A Guerin 0–1, P Murphy 0–1, B O'Connor 0–1.		S O'Sullivan 0–3, P O'Shea 0–1.

9 September 2017 First round	White's Cross	1–10 – 0–10 (aet)	Garnish	Inchigeelagh Grounds
	J Murphy 0–8, C Buckley 1–0, K Buckley 0–1, B O'Hara 0–1.		F O'Sullivan 0–4, S Terry O'Sullivan 0–2, B Terry O'Sullivan 0–2, P O'Neill 0–2.

10 September 2017 First round	Knocknagree	1–17 – 0–10	Delaney Rovers	Banteer Sportsfield
	A O'Connor 0–7, D Cooper 1–1, M Dilworth 0–4, F O'Connor 0–2, E McSweeney 0–1, J Dennehy 0–1, M Mahony 0–1.		R Downey 0–3, C McCarthy 0–2, V Keating 0–2, C Healy 0–1, M O'Driscoll 0–1, D Ahern 0–1.	Referee: M Sheehan (Liscarroll)

16 September 2017 First round	Kilmacabea	1–07 – 0–04	Kilworth	Blarney Grounds
	D Gore 1–2, D O'Callaghan 0–1, G O'Donovan 0–1, D McCarthy 0–1, O O'Sullivan 0–1, L Thompson 0–1.		T Twomey 0–2, L Whelan 0–1, P Moakley 0–1.

16 September 2017 First round	Kilmurry	1–17 – 1–02	Kilbrittain	Páirc Uinseann
	J Ryan 0–6, S Curzon 1–1, S Warren 0–3, J Buckley 0–3, G Barrett 0–2, J O'Mullane 0–1, W Buckley 0–1.		I Burke 1–0, P Wall 0–1, P O'Mahony 0–1.

20 September 2017 First round	Buttevant	3–11 – 2–07	Glenbower Rovers	Páirc Mhic Gearailt
	R Fowley 1–3, S Madigan 1–2, K O'Keeffe 1–1, J O'Neill 0–2, D O'Connell 0–2, D Walsh 0–1.		S Long 2–3, A Walsh 0–2, B McCarthy 0–1, J O'Connor 0–1.

25 September 2017 First round	Iveleary	1–18 – 0–07	Valley Rovers	Kilmurry Grounds
	C Vaughan 1–6, C Óg Jones 0–5, B O'Leary 0–3, B Cronin 0–3, F McSweeney 0–1.		A Settini 0–4, W Hurley 0–1, P Hurley 0–1, F Lyons 0–1.

2 October 2017 First round	Erin's Own	0–12 – 0–04	Belgooly	Páirc na Briain Diolúnaigh
	S Murphy 0–3, M Collins 0–2, E Murphy 0–2, J Taylor 0–2, J Sheehan 0–1, K Murphy 0–1, S Broderick 0–1.		B Dwyer 0–4.

=== Quarter-finals ===
30 September 2017 Quarter-final	Knocknagree	2–19 – 1–10	Buttevant
	A O'Connor 1–10, E McSweeney 0–6, J Dennehy 1–0, M Dilworth 0–2, F O'Connor 0–1.		R Fowley 1–2, D O'Connell 0–4, Seamus Madigan 0–1, K O'Keeffe 0–1, JD Murphy 0–1, J O'Neill 0–1.

30 September 2017 Quarter-final	Iveleary	3–10 – 1–12	Boherbue	Millstreet Grounds
	C Jones 1–4, B Cronin 1–2, C Vaughan 1–2, B O'Leary 0–2.		J O'Connor 1–5, M O'Connor 0–2, A O'Connor 0–1, A Murphy 0–1, J Casey 0–1, M O'Gorman 0–1, N Murphy 0–1.	Referee: D Farrell (Mitchelstown)

30 September 2017 Quarter-final	Kilmacabea	0–16 – 0–07	White's Cross	Kilmurry Grounds
	D Gore 0–10, S O'Driscoll 0–2, D McCarthy 0–2, R O'Sullivan 0–1, L Thompson 0–1.		J Murphy 0–3, C Buckley 0–2, E Buckley 0–1, K Ryan 0–1.

11 October 2017 Quarter-final	Kilmurry	0–08 – 0–09	Erin's Own	Páirc Uí Rinn
	E Clifford 0–2, J Ryan 0–2, J Buckley 0–1, W Buckley 0–1, S Warren 0–1, S Curzon 0–1.		J Taylor 0–6, J Sheehan 0–1, M O'Carroll 0–1, C O'Callaghan 0–1.

=== Semi-finals ===
7 October 2017 Semi-final	Knocknagree	2–13 – 0–18	Iveleary	Millstreet Grounds
	A O'Connor 1–6, F O'Connor 1–3, E McSweeney 0–1, D Moynihan 0–1, M Dilworth 0–1, M Mahony 0–1.		C Vaughan 0–4, B Cronin 0–4, B O'Leary 0–3, G McSweeney 0–3, B Murphy 0–1, S O'Leary 0–1, C Óg Jones 0–1, J Creedon 0–1.

14 October 2017 Semi-final	Erin's Own	1–12 – 1–12 (aet)	Kilmacabea	Brinny Sportsfield
	J Taylor 0–5, T O'Leary 1–0, S Murphy 0–3, A Bowen 0–2, M Carroll 0–2.		D O'Callaghan 1–2, D Gore 0–3, R O'Sullivan 0–2, D O'Sullivan 0–1, L Thompson 0–1, D Lynch 0–1, M Collins 0–1, J Collins 0–1.	Referee: C Murphy (Brian Dillons)

21 October 2017 Semi-final replay	Erin's Own	1–11 – 0–10	Kilmacabea	Brinny Sportsfield
	E Murphy 1–1, S Lee 0–3, S Murphy 0–3, T O'Leary 0–3, C O'Callaghan 0–1.		D Gore 0–7, R O'Sullivan 0–2, G O'Donovan 0–1.

=== Final ===
29 October 2017 Final	Knocknagree	2–19 – 2–10	Erin's Own	Páirc Uí Rinn
	JF Daly 1–3, M Dilworth 0–6, A O'Connor 0–5, J Dennehy 1–0, D Cooper 0–2, E McSweeney 0–2, C White 0–1.		J Taylor 1–5, T O'Leary 1–0, S Murphy 0–2, C Dooley 0–1, J O'Carroll 0–1, S Horgan 0–1.	Referee: C Dineen (Douglas)

== Championship statistics ==
=== Top scorers ===
Overall

Rank	Player	Club	Tally	Total	Matches	Average
1	Anthony O'Connor	Knocknagree	2–28	34	4	8.50
2	Damien Gore	Kilmacabea	1–22	25	4	6.25
3	James Taylor	Erin's Own	1–18	21	4	5.25
4	Cathal Vaughan	Iveleary	2–12	18	3	6.00
5	Jerry O'Connor	Boherbue	2–09	15	2	7.50
6	Chris Óg Jones	Iveleary	1–10	13	3	6.00
6	Matthew Dilworth	Knocknagree	0–13	13	4	3.25
8	Brian Cronin	Iveleary	1–09	12	3	4.00
9	Ryan Fowley	Buttevant	2–05	11	2	5.50
9	James Murphy	White's Cross	0–11	11	2	5.50
9	Shane Murphy	Shane Murphy	0–11	11	4	2.75

In a single game

Rank	Player	Club	Tally	Total	Opposition
1	Anthony O'Connor	Knocknagree	1–10	13	Buttevant
2	Damien Gore	Kilmacabea	0–10	10	White's Cross
3	Seán Long	Glenbower Rovers	2–03	9	Buttevant
4	Cathal Vaughan	Iveleary	1–06	9	Valley Rovers
4	Anthony O'Connor	Knocknagree	1–06	9	Iveleary
6	James Taylor	Erin's Own	1–05	8	Knocknagree
6	Jerry O'Connor	Boherbue	1–05	8	Iveleary
6	James Murphy	White's Cross	1–05	8	Garnish
9	Richard Moynihan	Boherbue	2–01	7	Urhan
9	Jerry O'Connor	Boherbue	1–04	7	Urhan
9	Chris Óg Jones	Iveleary	1–04	7	Urhan
9	Anthony O'Connor	Knocknagree	0–07	7	Delaney Rovers
9	Damien Gore	Kilmacabea	0–07	7	Erin's Own
