= 2020 Cork Junior A Football Championship =

122nd of the 1895 establishment by the Cork County Board

- Dates: 19 June – 7 August 2021
- Teams: 8
- Sponsor: Bon Secours Hospital
- Champions: Iveleary (1st title); Brian Cronin (captain); John McNulty (manager)
- Runners-up: Boherbue; Kevin Murphy (captain); Conor O'Riordan (manager)

Tournament statistics
- Matches played: 7
- Goals scored: 24 (3.43 per match)
- Points scored: 143 (20.43 per match)
- Top scorer(s): Chris Óg Jones (6–17)

The 2020 Cork Junior A Football Championship was the 122nd staging of the Cork Junior A Football Championship since its establishment by the Cork County Board in 1895. The championship was suspended indefinitely due to the impact of the COVID-19 pandemic on Gaelic games, but eventually ran from 19 June to 7 August 2021.

The final was played on 7 AUgust 2021 at the Mallow GAA Complex, between Iveleary and Boherbue, in what was their first ever meeting in the final. Iveleary won the match by 3–11 to 1–06 to claim their first ever championship title.

Iveleary's Chris Óg Jones was the championship's top scorer with 6–17.

== Format change ==
The championship had featured 16 teams, comprising the divisional champions and runners-up, since 2017. Because of time constraints as a result of the ongoing COVID-19 pandemic it was decided to revert to the old system of allowing only the divisional champions take part.

== Qualification ==
| Division | Championship | Champions |
|---|---|---|
| Avondhu | North Cork Junior A Football Championship | Charleville |
| Beara | Beara Junior A Football Championship | Urhan |
| Carbery | South West Junior A Football Championship | Kilmacabea |
| Carrigdhoun | South East Junior A Football Championship | Valley Rovers |
| Duhallow | Duhallow Junior A Football Championship | Boherbue |
| Imokilly | East Cork Junior A Football Championship | Midleton |
| Muskerry | Mid Cork Junior A Football Championship | Iveleary |
| Seandún | City Junior A Football Championship | Passage |

== Results ==
=== Quarter-finals ===
| 19 June 2021 Quarter-final | Midleton | 2–06 – 2–12 | Iveleary | Páirc Dhónaill Uí Cheallacháin |
| | L Dineen 2–1 C Beausang 0–5 (0–1 f). | Report | C Óg Jones 1–3, C O’Leary 1–0 B Cronin 0–3, I Jones, K Manning, D O’Riordan, A O’Donovan, S Galvin, C Vaughan 0–1 each. |

| 19 June 2021 Quarter-final | Charleville | 2–07 – 0–15 | Kilmacabea | Coachford Sportsfield |
| | M Kavanagh 1–4 (1–0 pen, 0–2 f), J Callaghan 1–1 (0–1 f), D Butler, and D Casey 0–1 each. | Report | D Gore 0–5 (0–3 f), C McCarthy 0–4 f, R O’Sullivan 0–2, D McCarthy, I Jennings, D O’Donovan and J Collins 0–1 each. |

| 19 June 2021 Quarter-final | Passage | 2–10 – 2–05 | Urhan | Sam Maguire Park |
| | A Kidney 1–3 (1–0 f, 0–3 45); M Guinane 1–0; S Harrington and S Howard (f) 0–2 each; N McCarthy, R Carroll, G Carroll 0–1 each. | Report | J Neill 0–3 (0–2 f); F Dwyer and C O’Sullivan 1–0 each; C Lowney (f) and P Shea 0–1 each. |

| 19 June 2021 Quarter-final | Boherbue | 1–14 – 2–09 | Valley Rovers | Páirc Eoin Mhic Charthaigh |
| | D McCarthy 0–6 f, A O’Connor 0–3, G O’Sullivan 0–3 (0–2 f), L Moynihan 1–0, D Buckley, A Murphy 0–1 each. | Report | P Hurley 1–2 (0–1 f), H O’Donovan 0–4 f; M Savic 1–0, A O’Leary 0–2, G Deane 0–1. |

=== Semi-finals ===
| 26 June 2021 Semi-final | Passage | 0–11 – 1–13 | Boherbue | Mallow GAA Complex |
| | S Howard 0–4 (0-3f), G Carroll 0–3, N McCarthy, R Carroll, R Cooney, C McCarthy 0–1 each | Report | D McCarthy 0–6 (0-6f), R Moynihan 1–1, B Herlihy 0–2, D Buckley, K Cremin, A O'Connor, A Murphy 0–1 each | Referee: R. Whelan (Aghada) |

| 1 August 2021 Semi-final | Iveleary | 5–16 – 1–08 | Kilmacabea | Sam Maguire Park |
| | C Óg Jones 2–6 (0-1f), C Vaughan 1–7 (0–3), I Jones 2–0, B Cronin, B O'leary, L O'Sullivan 0–1 each | Report | I Jennings 1–2, D Gore 0–4, D O'Donovan, D O'Sullivan 0–1 each |

=== Final ===
| 7 August 2021 Final | Boherbue | 1–06 – 3–11 | Iveleary | Mallow GAA Complex |
| | K Cremin (1–0), D McCarthy (0–2, frees), B Herlihy (0–2), L Moynihan, G O’Connor (free) (0–1 each). | Report | C Óg Jones (3–8, 2f), C Vaughan (0–2, frees), C Galvin (0–1). | Referee: J O'Regan (Lough Rovers) |

== Championship statistics ==
=== Top scorers ===
| Rank | Player | Club | Tally | Total | Matches | Average |
|---|---|---|---|---|---|---|
| 1 | Chris Óg Jones | Iveleary | 6–17 | 35 | 3 | 11.66 |
| 2 | Denis McCarthy | Boherbue | 0–14 | 14 | 3 | 4.66 |
| 3 | Cathal Vaughan | Iveleary | 1–10 | 13 | 3 | 4.33 |
| 4 | Damien Gore | Kilmacabea | 0–09 | 9 | 2 | 4.50 |
| 5 | Ian Jones | Iveleary | 2–01 | 7 | 3 | 2.33 |
| 5 | Luke Dineen | Midleton | 2–01 | 7 | 1 | 7.00 |
| 5 | Mark Kavanagh | Charleville | 1–04 | 7 | 1 | 7.00 |
| 8 | Anthony Kidney | Passage | 1–03 | 6 | 2 | 3.00 |
| 8 | Ian Jennings | Kilmacabea | 1–03 | 6 | 2 | 3.00 |
| 8 | Shane Howard | Passage | 0–06 | 6 | 2 | 3.00 |
