= Duhallow Junior A Football Championship =

Top footballing competition in the Duhallow division in Cork

- Code: Gaelic Football
- Founded: 1933
- Region: Duhallow (GAA)
- No. of teams: 7
- Title holders: Castlemagner (10th title)
- Most titles: Dromtarriffe (14 titles)
- Sponsors: Castlecor Patatoes
- Official website: https://duhallowgaacork.com/

The Duhallow Junior A Football Championship is the top footballing competition in the Duhallow division in Cork. It was first run after the formation of the Duhallow division in 1933. The Championship includes a group stage, therefore every team has at least 2 matches. The winners of this competition go on to compete in the Cork Junior A Football Championship.

Castlemagner are the 2026 title-holders, having defeated Ballydesmond by 1–10 to 1–09 in the 2026 final.

== Format ==
=== Group stage ===
The 6 teams enter the group stage. Over the course of the group stage, each team plays once against the others in the group, resulting in each team being guaranteed at least five games. Two points are awarded for a win, one for a draw and zero for a loss. The teams are ranked in the group stage table by points gained, then scoring difference and then their head-to-head record. The top four teams in each group qualify for the knockout stage.

=== Knockout stage ===
Semi-finals: The winners, runners-up, third-place and fourth-place from the group stage contest this round. The two winners from these games advance to the final.

Final: The two semi-final winners contest the final. The winning team are declared champions.

=== Promotion and relegation ===
At the end of the championship, the winning team enters the Cork Junior A Football Championship and by winning this, they will be promoted to the Cork Premier Junior Football Championship for the following season. The bottom placed team from the group stage is relegated to the Duhallow Junior B Football Championship.

== Qualification for subsequent competitions ==
At the end of the championship, the winning team qualify to the subsequent Cork Junior A Football Championship.

== Teams ==
As of 2026, the teams included:

| Club | Location | Colours | Position in 2026 | In Championship since | Championship Titles | Last Championship Title |
|---|---|---|---|---|---|---|
| Ballydesmond | Ballydesmond | Blue and gold | Runners-up | 2026 | 4 | 2007 |
| Castlemagner | Castlemagner | Black and amber | Champions | 2003 | 10 | 2026 |
| Kanturk | Kanturk | Green and white | Group stage | 2020 | 5 | 2011 |
| Kilbrin | Kilbrin | Blue and white | Group stage | 2023 | 0 | — |
| Knocknagree | Knocknagree | White and royal blue | Group stage | — | 12 | 2016 |
| Lismire | Lismire | Black and amber | Semi-finals | 2025 | 0 | — |
| Lyre | Banteer | Black and white | Semi-finals | 2007 | 2 | 2013 |

== Roll of honour ==
=== By club ===
| # | Club | Titles | Runners-Up | Championships won | Championships runner-up |
|---|---|---|---|---|---|
| 1 | Dromtarriffe | 14 | 13 | 1933, 1934, 1938, 1943, 1945, 1946, 1951, 1953, 1956, 1959, 1973, 1974, 1995, 2005 | 1947, 1948, 1954, 1970, 1971, 1992, 1994, 1999, 2003, 2004, 2006, 2007, 2018 |
| 2 | Knocknagree | 12 | 11 | 1966, 1978, 1979, 1981, 1982, 1983, 1984, 1989, 1990, 1991, 2015, 2016 | 1940, 1962, 1968, 1975, 1977, 1980, 1988, 2014, 2017, 2023, 2024 |
| 3 | Castlemagner | 10 | 7 | 1947, 1948, 1952, 1957, 1960, 1961, 2023, 2024, 2025, 2026 | 1953, 1955, 1957, 1959, 1963, 1964, 1966 |
| 4 | Boherbue | 8 | 11 | 1935, 1972, 1988, 2017, 2018, 2019, 2020, 2021 | 1936, 1944, 1967, 1973, 1981, 1982, 1983, 1984, 1990, 2001, 2008 |
| 4 | Newmarket | 8 | 7 | 1949, 1950, 1965, 1968, 1969, 1970, 1993, 1998 | 1934, 1941, 1942, 1945, 1952, 1978, 1989 |
| 6 | Cullen | 7 | 6 | 1936, 1939, 1967, 2004, 2006, 2008, 2022 | 1937, 1965, 2013, 2016, 2020, 2021 |
| 6 | Rockchapel | 7 | 5 | 1976, 1977, 1980, 1985, 1987, 2001, 2012 | 1974, 1996, 2002, 2009, 2011 |
| 6 | Millstreet | 7 | 5 | 1941, 1944, 1955, 1963, 1993, 2003, 2014 | 1933, 1939, 1946, 1998, 2012 |
| 6 | Kiskeam | 7 | 4 | 1964, 1994, 1996, 1997, 1999, 2000, 2002, | 1960, 1985, 1991, 1995 |
| 10 | Kanturk | 5 | 11 | 1954, 1957, 1962, 2009, 2011 | 1943, 1950, 1961, 1986, 1987, 1993, 1997, 2000, 2010, 2022, 2025 |
| 11 | Ballydesmond | 4 | 6 | 1971, 1975, 1986, 2007 | 1969, 1972, 1976, 1979, 2005, 2026 |
| 12 | Lyre | 2 | 2 | 2010, 2013 | 2015, 2019 |
| 12 | Clondrohid | 2 | 1 | 1940, 1942 | 1938 |
| 14 | Banteer | 1 | 0 | 1937 | — |
| 15 | Araglin Desmonds | 0 | 2 | — | 1949, 1951 |
| 15 | Glenlara | 0 | 2 | — | 1956, 1958 |
| 15 | Kilcorney | 0 | 1 | — | 1935 |

== List of finals ==
| Year | Winners | | Runners-up | | # |
| Year | Club | Score | Club | Score | # |
|---|---|---|---|---|---|
| 2026 | Castlemagner | 1-10 | Ballydesmond | 1-09 | |
| 2025 | Castlemagner | 1-07 | Kanturk | 1-06 | |
| 2024 | Castlemagner | 2-11 | Knocknagree | 0-07 | |
| 2023 | Castlemagner | 1-14 | Knocknagree | 0-07 | |
| 2022 | Cullen | 4-16 | Kanturk | 1-02 | |
| 2021 | Boherbue | 2-09 | Cullen | 1-10 | |
| 2020 | Boherbue | 1-18 | Cullen | 0-06 | |
| 2019 | Boherbue | 3-07 | Lyre | 0-10 | |
| 2018 | Boherbue | 2-14, 0-07 (R) | Dromtarriffe | 2-14, 0-06 (R) | |
| 2017 | Boherbue | 1-14, 1-12 (R) | Knocknagree | 2-11, 0-14 (R) | |
| 2016 | Knocknagree | 1-12 | Cullen | 0-13 | |
| 2015 | Knocknagree | 1-12, 1-12 (R) | Lyre | 1-12, 0-04 (R) | |
| 2014 | Millstreet | 2-13 | Knocknagree | 1-11 | |
| 2013 | Lyre | 0-13 | Cullen | 2-05 | |
| 2012 | Rockchapel | 1-11 | Millstreet | 0-10 | |
| 2011 | Kanturk | 1-11 | Rockchapel | 1-06 | |
| 2010 | Lyre | 1-09 | Kanturk | 0-09 | |
| 2009 | Kanturk | 1-12 | Rockchapel | 1-06 | |
| 2008 | Cullen | 3-08, 0-10 (R) | Boherbue | 1-14, 0-09 (R) | |
| 2007 | Ballydesmond | 1-10 | Dromtarriffe | 0-08 | |
| 2006 | Cullen | 0-11 | Dromtarriffe | 0-10 | |
| 2005 | Dromtarriffe | 1-14 | Ballydesmond | 0-12 | |
| 2004 | Cullen | 0-07 | Dromtarriffe | 0-06 | |
| 2003 | Millstreet | 3-05 | Dromtarriffe | 0-09 | |
| 2002 | Kiskeam | 1-08 | Rockchapel | 0-06 | |
| 2001 | Rockchapel | 0-09 | Boherbue | 0-05 | |
| 2000 | Kiskeam | 0-11 | Kanturk | 0-08 | |
| 1999 | Kiskeam | 0-08 | Dromtarriffe | 0-06 | |
| 1998 | Newmarket | 0-13 | Millstreet | 1-09 | |
| 1997 | Kiskeam | 2-06, 2-13 (R) | Kanturk | 1-09, 2-06 (R) | |
| 1996 | Kiskeam | 3-04 | Rockchapel | 1-06 | |
| 1995 | Dromtarriffe | 1-09, 1-14 (R) | Kiskeam | 1-09, 1-09 (R) | |
| 1994 | Kiskeam | 1-09 | Dromtarriffe | 0-09 | |
| 1993 | Newmarket | 2-14 | Kanturk | 2-05 | |
| 1992 | Millstreet | 2-08 | Dromtarriffe | 3-03 | |
| 1991 | Knocknagree | 1-13 | Kiskeam | 2-06 | |
| 1990 | Knocknagree | 1-17 | Boherbue | 0-06 | |
| 1989 | Knocknagree | 2-11 | Newmarket | 1-07 | |
| 1988 | Boherbue | 1-12 | Knocknagree | 0-08 | |
| 1987 | Rockchapel | 2-06 | Kanturk | 1-07 | |
| 1986 | Ballydesmond | 2-08 | Kanturk | 1-08 | |
| 1985 | Rockchapel | 0-10 | Kiskeam | 0-04 | |
| 1984 | Knocknagree | 1-11 | Boherbue | 2-07 | |
| 1983 | Knocknagree | 1-11 | Boherbue | 1-07 | |
| 1982 | Knocknagree | 1-11 | Boherbue | 0-09 | |
| 1981 | Knocknagree | 2-06 | Boherbue | 0-10 | |
| 1980 | Rockchapel | 2-10 | Knocknagree | 1-07 | |
| 1979 | Knocknagree | 1-11 | Ballydesmond | 1-09 | |
| 1978 | Knocknagree | 1-10 | Newmarket | 0-04 | |
| 1977 | Rockchapel | 1-07 | Knocknagree | 0-02 | |
| 1976 | Rockchapel | 2-07 | Ballydesmond | 2-05 | |
| 1975 | Ballydesmond | 3-10 | Knocknagree | 3-05 | |
| 1974 | Dromtarriffe | 3-06 | Rockchapel | 1-05 | |
| 1973 | Dromtarriffe | 2-08 | Boherbue | 2-04 | |
| 1972 | Boherbue | 2-08 | Ballydesmond | 2-05 | |
| 1971 | Ballydesmond | 2-08 | Dromtarriffe | 3-03 | |
| 1970 | Newmarket | 1-08 | Dromtarriffe | 1-03 | |
| 1969 | Newmarket | 1-07 | Ballydesmond | 0-06 | |
| 1968 | Newmarket | 3-12 | Knocknagree | 0-02 | |
| 1967 | Cullen | 0-09 | Boherbue | 0-04 | |
| 1966 | Knocknagree | 1-10, 1-05 (R) | Castlemagner | 3-04, 0-07 (R) | |
| 1965 | Newmarket | 1-08 | Cullen | 1-07 | |
| 1964 | Kiskeam | 0-11 | Castlemagner | 1-03 | |
| 1963 | Millstreet | 2-13 | Castlemagner | 0-01 | |
| 1962 | Kanturk | 3-05 (R) | Knocknagree | 1-06 (R) | |
| 1961 | Castlemagner | 3-00 | Kanturk | 1-03 | |
| 1960 | Castlemagner | 2-05 | Kiskeam | 1-07 | |
| 1959 | Dromtarriffe | 4-05 | Castlemagner | 2-06 | |
| 1958 | Castlemagner | 5-08 | Glenlara | 2-03 | |
| 1957 | Kanturk | 2-05 | Castlemagner | 1-04 | |
| 1956 | Dromtarriffe | 1-06 | Glenlara | 2-01 | |
| 1955 | Millstreet | 2-08 | Castlemagner | 2-04 | |
| 1954 | Kanturk | 1-03, 1-02 (R) | Dromtarriffe | 0-06, 0-03 (R) | |
| 1953 | Dromtarriffe | 2-03 | Castlemagner | 0-01 | |
| 1952 | Castlemagner | 1-07 | Newmarket | 0-04 | |
| 1951 | Dromtarriffe | 1-03, 2-05 (R) | Araglin Desmonds | 1-03, 1-03 (R) | |
| 1950 | Newmarket | 3-04 | Kanturk | 2-03 | |
| 1949 | Newmarket | 0-03 | Araglin Desmonds | 0-01 | |
| 1948 | Castlemagner | 1-03 | Dromtarriffe | 0-03 | |
| 1947 | Castlemagner | 2-06 | Dromtarriffe | 1-01 | |
| 1946 | Dromtarriffe | | Millstreet | | |
| 1945 | Dromtarriffe | | Newmarket | | |
| 1944 | Millstreet | 0-06, 3-05 (R) | Boherbue | 1-03, 0-02 (R) | |
| 1943 | Dromtarriffe | 1-04 | Kanturk | 1-02 | |
| 1942 | Clondrohid | 3-06 | Newmarket | 0-07 | |
| 1941 | Millstreet | 1-02 | Newmarket | 0-02 | |
| 1940 | Clondrohid | 3-07 | Knocknagree | 0-05 | |
| 1939 | Cullen | 2-07 | Millstreet | 2-01 | |
| 1938 | Dromtarriffe | | Clondrohid | | |
| 1937 | Banteer | 1-01 | Cullen | 0-03 | |
| 1936 | Cullen | 1-03 | Boherbue | 0-03 | |
| 1935 | Boherbue | 3-05 | Kilcorney | 3-00 | |
| 1934 | Dromtarriffe | 1-04 | Newmarket | 1-01 | |
| 1933 | Dromtarriffe | 1-04 | Millstreet | 1-02 | |

== Records and statistics ==
=== Team results by championship ===
Legend

- 1st – Champions
- 2nd – Runners-up
- SF/GS – Semi-finals/Group Stage

For each year, the number of teams in the championship (in brackets) are shown.

| Team | 2019 (5) | 2020 (6) | 2021 (6) | 2022 (7) | 2023 (6) | 2024 (5) | Years |
|---|---|---|---|---|---|---|---|
| Boherbue | 1st | 1st | 1st | — | — | — | 3 |
| Cullen | SF | 2nd | 2nd | 1st | — | — | 4 |
| Castlemagner | GS | GS | SF | SF | 1st | 1st | 6 |
| Newmarket | — | — | — | GS | GS | — | 2 |
| Kilbrin | — | — | — | — | GS | SF | 2 |
| Kanturk | — | — | — | 2nd | GS | GS | 3 |
| Lyre | 2nd | GS | SF | SF | SF | GS | 6 |
| Kiskeam | — | GS | GS | GS | — | — | 3 |
| Knocknagree | GS | GS | GS | GS | 2nd | 2nd | 6 |

== See also ==
- Duhallow Junior A Hurling Championship
