= 2017 Cork Intermediate Football Championship =

82nd staging of the Cork Intermediate Football Championship

- Dates: 9 April - 29 October 2017
- Teams: 20
- Sponsor: Evening Echo
- Champions: Kanturk (2nd title); Aidan Walsh (captain); Jerome Walsh (manager)
- Runners-up: Mitchelstown

Tournament statistics
- Top scorer(s): Donncha O'Connor (1-42)

The 2017 Cork Intermediate Football Championship was the 82nd staging of the Cork Intermediate Football Championship since its establishment by the Cork County Board in 1909. The championship ran from 9 April to 29 October 2017.

The final was played on 29 October 2017 at Páirc Uí Rinn in Cork, between Kanturk and Mitchelstown, in what was their first ever meeting in the final. Kanturk won the match by 0–14 to 0–13 to claim their second championship title overall and a first title in 97 years.

== Results ==
=== Round 1 ===
9 April 2017 Round 1	Glanmire	1-14 - 3-13	Kildorrery	Castlelyons Grounds
	A Barry 0-8, G O'Callaghan 1-1, S O'Driscoll 0-2, J Cussen 0-1, A Garvey 0-1, J Murphy 0-1.		T Monaghan 1-3, F Stapleton 1-1, D Kelly 1-0, S Fitzgerald 0-2, J O'Sullivan 0-2, S Coughlan 0-2, S O'Neill 0-2, P O'Brien 0-1.

15 April 2017 Round 1	Cill na Martra	3-13 - 1-11	Gabriel Rangers	Páirc Tadhg na Samhna
	M Ó Deasúna 1-6, M Ó Duinnín 2-0, S Ó Duinnín 0-3, D Mac Lochlainn 0-1, G Ó Goillidhe 0-1, D Ó Duinnín 0-1, D Ó Conaill 0-1.		M Cronin 1-6, E Goggin 0-2, G O'Callaghan 0-1, S Kelleher 0-1, D O'Callaghan 0-1.

15 April 2017 Round 1	Glenville	2-12 - 2-08	Kinsale	Páirc Liam Mhic Cárthaigh
	D McCarthy 2-0, D Dennehy 0-4, B Halbert 0-2, W Connolly 0-2, P Cahill 0-2, E O'Reilly 0-1, PJ Dennehy 0-1.		J Gould 1-6, G Finn 1-0, B McGory 0-1, D Ward 0-1.

15 April 2017 Round 1	Mayfield	1-10 - 1-15	Millsteet	Carrigadrohid Grounds
	P Condon 1-3, D Lucey 0-2, S O'Donovan 0-2, K Punch 0-1, J O'Driscoll 0-1, C O'Neill 0-1.		M Vaughan 0-6, D Buckley 1-0, M Ellis 0-3, S Hickey 0-2, J Linehan 0-2, C Crowley 0-1, P Sheehan 0-1.

22 April 2017 Round 1	Adrigole	0-11 - 0-13	Rockchapel	Inchigeelagh Grounds
	D Harrington 0-5, K Goggin 0-3, K O'Sullivan-Greene 0-2, AJ O'Sullivan 0-1.		L Collins 0-7, J Forrest 0-2, S Hickey 0-2, C Aherne 0-1, J O'Callaghan 0-1.

22 April 2017 Round 1	Aghabullogue	1-15 - 1-10	Youghal	Páirc Séamus de Barra
	D Moynihan 1-2, J Corkery 0-5, M Bradley 0-4, P Finnegan 0-3, E O'Sullivan 0-1.		D O'Mahony 1-3, N Roche 0-3, J O'Mahony 0-1, A Joyce 0-1, D Walsh 0-1, A Kenny 0-1.

22 April 2017 Round 1	Kanturk	2-15 - 1-13	Mitchelstown	Churchtown Grounds
	M Healy 1-2, C Clernon 1-2, I Walsh 0-5, P Walsh 0-3, J McLoughin 0-1, J Browne 0-1, R Walsh 0-1.		S Cahill 1-2, J Sheehan 0-4, D Reidy-Price 0-3, P Magee 0-2, S Walsh 0-2.

23 April 2017 Round 1	Ballydesmond	0-10 - 3-19	St Finbarr's	Castlemagner Grounds
	D O'Connor 0-8, N Fleming 0-1, R Flynn 0-1.		C Myers-Murray 1-5, C Barrett 1-2, A Murphy 0-4, E Finn 0-2, E McGreevy 0-2, K Hodgins 0-2, C Walsh 0-1, B O'Connell 0-1.

29 April 2017 Round 1	Douglas	1-05 - 2-11	Glanworth	Felix Sarsfields Memorial Park
	C O'Brien 1-0, S Walsh 0-2, C Dineen 0-1, D Kelly 0-1, S Buckley 0-1.		S O'Riordan 2-3, M Sheehan 0-3, E Sheehan 0-2, D Colfer 0-1, G O'Neill 0-1, R O'Driscoll 0-1.

19 May 2017 Round 1	Carrigaline	2-06 - 1-11	Clonakilty	Kinsale Grounds
	S O'Brien 1-2, M O'Reilly 1-0, P Courtney 0-2, C Maguire 0-2.		P O'Sullivan 1-0, J Cowhig 0-3, L Cahll 0-3, S White 0-2, S Nagle 0-1, S O'Donoghue 0-1, A Murphy 0-1.

=== Round 2A ===
28 May 2017 Round 2A	Clonakilty	1-10 - 0-17	Cill na Martra	Castletown Grounds
	L Cahill 0-5, E Deasy 1-0, J Cowhig 0-2, G Murray 0-2, S Nagle 0-1.		M Ó Deasúna 0-11, S Ó Duinnín 0-2, D Ó Duinnín 0-1, M Ó Duinnín 0-1, N Ó Laoire 0-1, S Ó Ceilleachair 0-1.

28 May 2017 Round 2A	Aghabullogue	1-03 - 2-13	St Finbarr's	Brinny Sportsfield
	D Thompson 1-1, E O'Sullivan 0-2.		C Myers-Murray 0-7, C Walsh 1-0, R O'Mahony 1-0, C Barrett 0-3, E McGreevy 0-2, B O'Connell 0-1.

4 June 2017 Round 2A	Glenville	0-11 - 1-12	Kildorrery	Castlelyons Grounds
	P Cahill 0-4, K Coakley 0-3, D McCarthy 0-1, A Spriggs 0-1, D Dennehy 0-1, A Cronin 0-1.		T Monaghan 0-5, E O'Connor 1-0, S O'Neill 0-3, J O'Sullivan 0-2, J McCarthy 0-1, S O'Sullivan 0-1.

28 July 2017 Round 2A	Kanturk	0-14 - 2-07	Rockchapel	Newmarket Grounds
	I Walsh 0-5, J Browne 0-2, C Clernon 0-2, K Holland 0-1, M Healy 0-1, J McLoughlin 0-1, R Walsh 0-1, D O'Connor 0-1.		L Collins 2-3, S Hickey 0-4.

20 August 2017 Round 2A	Glanworth	2-15 - 1-06	Millstreet	Castlemagner Grounds
	M Sheehan 0-7, D Colfer 1-3, S O'Riordan 1-1, S Finn 0-2, D Pyne 0-1, E Sheehan 0-1.		T Collins 1-0, C Crowley 0-3, M Ellis 0-1, M Vaughan 0-1, K Crowley 0-1.

=== Round 2B ===
28 May 2017 Round 2B	Carrigaline	1-13 - 5-15	Gabriel Rangers	Ballinacarriga Grounds
	P Courtney 1-1, A Coholan 0-3, E O'Keeffe 0-2, D Manley 0-2, M O'Reilly 0-2, S Dwane 0-1, J O'Regan 0-1, C McGuire 0-1.		E Goggin 2-1, M Cronin 1-6, S Kelleher 1-3, C Moynihan 0-4, G O'Callaghan 1-0, D O'Callaghan 0-1.

11 June 2017 Round 2B	Glanmire	2-10 - 1-06	Kinsale	Carrigaline Grounds
	A Barry 1-4, D McCarthy 1-0, J Murphy 0-3, J Cussen 0-1, T Hourihan 0-1, A Brennan 0-1.		C Mitchell 1-0, C Donnellan 0-2, G Finn 0-1, B McGrory 0-1, C O'Brien 0-1, D Ward 0-1.

11 June 2017 Round 2B	Douglas	0-10 - 2-11	Mayfield	Ballinlough Grounds
	C Collins 0-3, S Buckley 0-2, S Walsh 0-2, D Ward 0-1, J Lane 0-1, J Farrell 0-1.		D Grainger 1-6, M Barry 1-1, P Condon 0-1, D Lucey 0-1, N Kelly 0-1, S O'Donovan 0-1.

24 June 2017 Round 2B	Adrigole	0-10 - 2-21	Mitchelstown	Castle Grounds
	D Harrington 0-6, K Jer O'Sullivan 0-2, B Jer O'Sullivan 0-1, J Goggin 0-1.		S Beston 1-5, S Cahill 1-3, L Keane 0-6, S Walsh 0-3, S O'Sullivan 0-2, P Magee 0-1, J Sheehan 0-1.

29 July 2017 Round 2B	Ballydesmond	1-12 - 3-05	Youghal	Glanworth Grounds
	D Moynihan 1-2, N Fleming 0-3, B Fleming 0-3, Donncha O'Connor 0-3, Donal O'Connor 0-1.		K McCarthy 1-2, J O'Mahony 1-1, J Ormonde 1-0, C O'Sullivan 0-1, R Cunningham 0-1.

=== Relegation playoffs ===
13 September 2017 Round 1	Kinsale	0-13 - 1-13	Youghal	Páirc Séamus de Barra
	G Finn 0-5, R O'Hanlon 0-2, J Wright 0-2, R O'Sullivan 0-2, C Lane 0-1, C O'Brien 0-1.		J O'Mahony 1-1, K McCarthy 0-4, D O'Mahony 0-2, R Walsh 0-2, A Frahill-O'Connor 0-1, P Moylan 0-1, A Joyce 0-1, R Cunningham 0-1.

1 October 2017 Round 2	Adrigole	2-15 - 0-07	Douglas	Uíbh Laoire GAA Grounds
	D Harrington 1-7, K Jer O'Sullivan 0-4, K Goggin 0-2, J Harrington 1-0, C O'Shea 0-1, T O'Shea 0-1.		C Dineen 0-4, I Lucey 0-1, J Collins 0-1, M Lynch 0-1.

7 October 2017 Round 2	Carrigaline	2-04 - 4-18	Kinsale	Brinny Sportsfield
			R O'Hanlon 1-5, G Finn 0-7.

=== Round 3 ===
11 August 2017 Round 3	Clonakilty	1-10 - 1-20	Gabriel Rangers	Castlehaven Grounds
	S Collins 0-4, O O'Donovan 1-1, A Murphy 0-3, S O'Donoghue 0-1, T Hayes 0-1.		M Cronin 0-9, G O'Callaghan 1-2, S Kelleher 0-3, E Goggin 0-2, C Moynihan 0-2, F Hurley 0-1, P Hegarty 0-1.

11 August 2017 Round 3	Glanmire	2-11 - 1-19	Rockchapel	Mallow GAA Complex
	A Barry 1-3, T Hourihane 1-3, J Murphy 0-2, J Burkley 0-1, S O'Driscoll 0-1, E Murphy 0-1.		S Hickey 0-7, L Collins 0-4, W Murphy 1-1, J Forrest 0-3 J O'Callaghan 0-2, K Collins 0-2.

12 August 2017 Round 3	Ballydesmond	0-10 - 0-10	Glenville	Mallow GAA Complex
	Donncha O'Connor 0-7, N Fleming 0-2, B Fleming 0-1.		B Halbert 0-3, D Dennehy 0-3, D O'Donovan 0-2, P Cahill 0-1, D McCarthy 0-1.

20 August 2017 Round 3	Aghabullogue	1-15 - 1-09	Mayfield	Páirc Uí Rinn
	J Corkery 0-5, N Barry-Murphy 1-1, M Bradley 0-4, D Thompson 0-2, P Finnegan 0-1, R Dennehy 0-1, E O'Sullivan 0-1.		P Condon 0-6, M Barry 1-0, D Lucey 0-1, S O'Donovan 0-1, J O'Driscoll 0-1.

26 August 2017 Round 3 replay	Ballydesmond	2-11 - 0-11	Glenville	Churchtown Grounds
	Donncha O'Connor 0-8, D Moynihan 1-1, S Kelly 1-0, N Fleming 0-1, J O'Keeffe 0-1.		D Dennehy 0-4, K Coakley 0-3, E O'Reilly 0-2, B Halbert 0-1, D McCarthy 0-1.

2 September 2017 Round 3	Millstreet	0-11 - 1-13	Mitchelstown	Churchtown Grounds
	M Vaughan 0-4, C Crowley 0-3, S Hickey 0-2, D Buckley 0-1, T Sheehan 0-1.		S Fox 1-0, S Walsh 0-3, P Magee 0-2, L Keane 0-2, D Dineen 0-1, M Walsh 0-1, S Beston 0-1, S Cahill 0-1, J Cott 0-1, D Reidy-Price 0-1.

=== Round 4 ===
9 September 2017 Round 4	Ballydesmond	1-14 - 1-14	Mitchelstown	Mallow GAA Complex
	Donncha O'Connor 0-8, S Kelly 1-0, Donal O'Connor 0-2, B Fleming 0-2, N Fleming 0-1, D Moynihan 0-1.		J Sheehan 0-7, S Beston 1-1, C O'Mahony 0-3, S Cahill 0-1, D Dineen 0-1, L Keane 0-1.

9 September 2017 Round 4	Aghabullogue	1-12 - 2-09	Rockchapel	Mallow GAA Complex
	M Bradley 0-6, D Thompson 1-0, E O'Sullivan 0-2, J Corkery 0-2, M Long 0-1, P Finnegan 0-1.		S Hickey 1-2, L Collins 0-4, B Cahill 1-0, D Curtin 0-2, DJ O'Sullivan 0-1.

16 September 2017 Round 4 replay	Ballydesmond	1-10 - 2-19	Mitchelstown	Mourneabbey Grounds
	Donncha O'Connor 1-8, S Cronin 0-1, Donal O'Connor 0-1.		C O'Mahony 1-4, D Reidy-Price 1-1, L Keane 0-3, S Cahill 0-3, D Dineen 0-2, S Walsh 0-2, S Beston 0-2, J Sheehan 0-1, L O'Flynn 0-1.

16 September 2017 Round 4 replay	Aghabullogue	2-09 - 4-05	Rockchapel	Mourneabbey Grounds
	M Bradley 1-4, D Thompson 1-3, N Barry-Murphy 0-1, J Corkery 0-1.		S Hickey 2-1, B Cahill 1-1, W Murphy 1-0, J O'Callaghan 0-1, L Collins 0-1, J Forrest 0-1.

=== Quarter-finals ===
2 September 2017 Quarter-final	Cill na Martra	2-10 - 2-05	Gabriel Rangers	Aughaville Grounds
	M Dineen 1-2, M O'Connor 0-3, M Desmond 0-3, D McLoughlin 0-1, D Dineen 0-1.		E Goggin 1-2, C Moynihan 1-1, S Kelleher 0-1, G O'Callaghan 0-1.

2 September 2017 Quarter-final	Kildorrery	0-13 - 0-09	St Finbarr's	Felix Sarsfield Memorial Park
	T Monaghan 0-3, S O'Neill 0-3, P O'Brien 0-2, J O'Sullivan 0-2, A O'Brien 0-1, F Stapleton 0-1, W Fouhy 0-1.		E McGreevey 0-4, M O'Donovan 0-2, A Murphy 0-1, C Berrett 0-1, Cathal McCarthy 0-1.

23 September 2017 Quarter-final	Mitchelstown	1-11 - 2-05	Rockchapel	Dr Mannix Sportsfield
	C O'Mahony 1-2, M Walsh 0-4, D Dineen 0-2, S Beston 0-1, S Cahill 0-1, D Reidy-Price 0-1.		S Hickey 1-2, L Collins 0-3, J O'Callaghan 1-0.

23 September 2017 Quarter-final	Glanworth	0-07 - 1-07	Kanturk	Fr Con Buckley Park
	M Sheehan 0-2, S O'Riordan 0-1, E Sheehan 0-1, D Pyne 0-1, J Blackburne 0-1, B Gallagher 0-1.		K Holland 1-1, I Walsh 0-2, P Walsh 0-2, A Walsh 0-1, L McLoughlin 0-1.

=== Semi-finals ===
30 September 2017 Semi-final	Kanturk	0-18 - 2-06	Kildorrery	Dr Mannix Sportsfield
	I Walsh 0-9, A Walsh 0-2, J McLoughlin 0-1, J Browne 0-1, D Browne 0-1, M Healy 0-1, P Walsh 0-1, L McLoughlin 0-1, K Holland 0-1.		S O'Neill 1-3, J O'Sullivan 1-0, S Fitzgerald 0-1, T Monaghan 0-1, R McEniry 0-1.

30 September 2017 Semi-final	Cill na Martra	1-10 - 2-13	Mitchelstown	Banteer Sportsfield
	D Ó Duinnín 1-3, M Ó Conchúir 0-3, M Ó Deasúna 0-2, S Ó Duinnín 0-1, D Mac Lochlainn 0-1.		D Dineen 1-3, C O'Mahony 1-2, J Sheehan 0-3, S Walsh 0-2, S Cahill 0-1, S Beston 0-1, P Magee 0-1.

=== Final ===
29 October 2017 Final	Kanturk	0-14 - 0-13	Mitchelstown	Páirc Uí Rinn
	I Walsh 0-6 (3 frees), R Walsh 0-3, P Walsh, M Healy 0-2 each, A Sheehy 0-1.	Report	S Beston, C O’Mahony (1 free, 1 45), S O’Sullivan (2 frees) 0-3 each, M Walsh 0-2, S Walsh, J Sheehan (free) 0-1 each.	Referee: A Long (Argideen Rangers)

== Championship statistics ==
=== Top scorers ===
Rank	Player	Club	Tally	Total	Matches	Average
1	Donncha O'Connor	Ballydesmond	1-42	45	6	7.50
2	Séamus Hickey	Rockchapel	4-18	30	6	5.00
3	Liam Collins	Rockchapel	2-22	28	6	4.66
4	Mark Cronin	Gabriel Rangers	2-21	27	4	6.75
4	Ian Walsh	Kanturk	0-27	27	5	5.40
6	Mike Ó Deasúna	Cill na Martra	1-22	25	4	6.25
7	Cathail O'Mahony	Mitchelstown	3-14	23	5	4.60
8	Alan Barry	Glanmire	2-15	21	3	7.00
8	David Harrington	Adrigole	1-18	21	3	7.00
8	Matthew Bradley	Aghabullogue	1-18	21	5	4.20
