= 1974 Cork Junior Football Championship =

- Teams: 8
- Champions: Fermoy (5th title)
- Runners-up: Castletownbere

The 1974 Cork Junior Football Championship was the 76th staging of the Cork Junior Football Championship since its establishment by Cork County Board in 1895.

The final was played on 10 November 1974 at Sam Maguire Park in Dunmanway, between Fermoy and Castletownbere, in what was their first ever meeting in the final. Fermoy won the match by 1–07 to 0–08 to claim their fifth championship title overall and a first title in 38 years.

== Results ==
=== Final ===
10 November 1974 Final	Fermoy	1–06 – 0–08	Castletownbere	Sam Maguire Park
	T Learner 1–0, P Lonergan 0–3, B Higgins 0–1, M Dennehy 0–1, K McGann 0–1.		B Twomey 0–3, P McLoughlin 0–2, S O'Sullivan 0–1, M O'Driscoll 0–1, F McCarthy 0–1.	Referee: J McDonnell (O'Donovan Rossa)
