= Glenlara GAA =

Gaelic games club in County Cork, Ireland

Glenlara
- Gleann Lára
- Founded: 1939
- County: Cork
- Nickname: The Glen
- Colours: Green and Black
- Grounds: Glenlara
- Coordinates: 52°12′24.83″N 9°06′37.56″W

Playing kits
Standard colours

Glenlara GAA is a Gaelic Athletic Association club based in the rural area of Taur, Newmarket, County Cork, Ireland. The club plays Gaelic football in the Duhallow division competitions. Glenlara GAA Club was founded in 1939 by D.A. Daly, P.Shine and R O'Keeffe. Other clubs in the Glenlara area include Newmarket, Boherbue and Kiskeam. In recent years Glenlara GAA have established a permanent home at the old school in Glashykinleen which is central to Taur and Glenlara area. The old Glashykinleen school is now their changing rooms and they have developed a playing pitch adjacent to this. Glenlara won the Duhallow Junior B Football Championship Final Group 2 in 2011 and again in 2013.

== Honours ==
- Duhallow Junior A Football Championship
  - (silver) Runners-Up (2): 1956, 1958
- Examiner Cups Winners
  - (gold) Winners (3): 1954, 1958, 1970
- Duhallow Junior B Football Championship
  - (gold) Winners (4): 1941, 1950, 1961, 1981
- Duhallow Junior B Football (Group 2) Championship
  - (gold) Winners (2): 2011, 2013
- Duhallow Junior B Football League
  - (gold) Winners (2): 1984, 1988
- Duhallow Under-21 B Football League
  - (gold) Winners (1): 1992

== See also ==
- Duhallow GAA
