= 1936 Cork Junior Football Championship =

Irish Gaelic football competition

- Champions: Fermoy (4th title)
- Runners-up: Cullen

The 1936 Cork Junior Football Championship was the 38th staging of the Cork Junior Football Championship since its establishment by the Cork County Board in 1895.

The final was played on 22 November 1936 at the Gaelic Grounds in Mallow, between Fermoy and Cullen, in what was their first ever meeting in the final. Fermoy won the match by 3–01 to 0–02 to claim their fourth championship title overall and a first title in 27 years.

== Results ==
=== Final ===
22 November 1936 Final	Fermoy	3-01 - 0-02	Cullen	Mallow Gaelic Grounds
