= Killian O'Hanlon =

Irish Gaelic footballer

Personal information
- Native name: Cillian Ó hAnluain (Irish)
- Born: 1993 (age 32–33) Dromahane, County Cork, Ireland
- Occupation: Farmer
- Height: 6 ft 2 in (188 cm)

Sport
- Sport: Gaelic football
- Position: Midfield
Clubs
- Years: Club
- Kilshannig; Avondhu
Club titles
- Cork titles: 0
College
- Years: College
- 2017-2020: Cork Institute of Technology
College titles
- Sigerson titles: 0
Inter-county*
| Years | County | Apps (scores) |
| 2016-present | Cork | 7 (0-02) |
Inter-county titles
- Munster titles: 0
- All-Irelands: 0
- NHL: 0
- All Stars: 0
- *Inter County team apps and scores correct as of 19:36, 10 November 2020.

Killian O'Hanlon (born 1993) is an Irish Gaelic footballer who plays as a midfielder for club side Kilshannig, divisional side Avondhu and at inter-county level with the Cork senior football team.

== Playing career ==
=== Kilshannig ===
O'Hanlon joined the Kilshannig club at a young age and played in all grades at juvenile and underage levels before joining the club's junior team. He enjoyed his first success at adult level when the club secured the North Cork JAFC title in 2014, before claiming a second divisional title five years later. On 9 November 2019, O'Hanlon claimed a County Junior Championship title when he captained Kilshannig to a 0–22 to 0–11 defeat of St. James's in the final.

=== Cork ===
O'Hanlon first lined out for Cork when he joined the Cork minor team in advance of the 2011 Munster Minor Championship. He made his first appearance for the team on 13 April 2011 when was at left wing-back for Cork's 2–10 to 0–11 win over Clare. O'Hanlon lost his place on the starting fifteen for the subsequent Munster final defeat by Tipperary.

In what was his last year of eligibility for the team, O'Hanlon was called up to the Cork under-21 team. On 9 April 2014, he was selected at midfield when Cork defeated Tipperary by 1–18 to 3–08 to claim the Munster Under-21 Championship.

After lining out in several games during the successful pre-season McGrath Cup campaign, O'Hanlon was added to the Cork senior panel for the 2016 National League. He made his senior debut on 7 February 2016 when he came on as a 55th-minute substitute for Donal Óg Hodnett in a 2–14 to 1–07 defeat by Donegal. O'Hanlon failed to make the championship panel, but was drafted onto the Cork junior panel which eventually lost out in the Munster final to Kerry.

After two further but unsuccessful seasons with the Cork junior team, O'Hanlon made his senior championship debut on 7 July 2018 when he came on as a substitute for Jamie O'Sullivan in a 3–20 to 0–13 defeat by Tyrone in a Round 4 Qualifier.

On 22 June 2019, O'Hanlon lined out in his first Munster final when he was selected at midfield against Kerry. He earned a penalty after being fouled, however, he ultimately ended up on the losing side after a 1–19 to 3–10 defeat.

The disrupted 2020 National League saw O'Hanlon claim further silverware when Cork secured the Division 3 title after remaining undefeated for the entire campaign.

He and Aidan Browne sustained cruciate injuries in separate incidents when training resumed ahead of the delayed 2021 season. They were both ruled out for the season.

== Career statistics ==
As of match played 9 November 2020.

| Team | Year | National League | | | Munster | | All-Ireland | | Total | |
| Team | Year | Division | Apps | Score | Apps | Score | Apps | Score | Apps | Score |
|---|---|---|---|---|---|---|---|---|---|---|
| Cork | 2016 | Division 1 | 3 | 0-00 | 0 | 0-00 | 0 | 0-00 | 3 | 0-00 |
| Cork | 2017 | Division 2 | 0 | 0-00 | 0 | 0-00 | 0 | 0-00 | 0 | 0-00 |
| Cork | 2018 | Division 2 | 6 | 0-00 | 0 | 0-00 | 1 | 0-00 | 7 | 0-00 |
| Cork | 2019 | Division 2 | 6 | 0-02 | 2 | 0-00 | 3 | 0-00 | 11 | 0-02 |
| Cork | 2020 | Division 3 | 4 | 0-04 | 1 | 0-02 | 0 | 0-00 | 5 | 0-06 |
| Total | | | 19 | 0-06 | 3 | 0-02 | 4 | 0-00 | 26 | 0-08 |

== Honours ==
Kilshannig

- Cork Premier Intermediate Football Championship: 2024
- Cork Intermediate A Football Championship: 2022 (c)
- Cork Junior A Hurling Championship: 2025
- Cork Junior A Football Championship: 2019 (c)
- North Cork Junior A Football Championship: 2014, 2019 (c)
- North Cork Junior A Hurling Championship: 2022, 2025

Cork

- National Football League Division 3: 2020
- McGrath Cup: 2016
- Munster Under-21 Football Championship: 2014
