= Duhallow Junior B Hurling Championship =

Top footballing competition in the Duhallow division in Cork

- Code: Hurling
- Region: Duhallow (GAA)
- No. of teams: 4
- Title holders: Newmarket (5th title)
- Sponsors: Kanturk Co-Op Mart
- Official website: Duhallow GAA

The Duhallow Junior B Hurling Championship is the second highest hurling competition in the Duhallow division in Cork. It is run for teams deemed too weak for the Duhallow Junior A Hurling Championship. The championship includes a group stage, so every team has at least two matches. The winners of the Duhallow competition go on to compete in the Cork Junior B Inter-Divisional Hurling Championship.

Newmarket are the title-holders, defeating Dromtarriffe by 0–21 to 0–07 in the 2025 final.

== Teams ==
As of the 2026 competition, the teams were:

Club	Location	Colours	Position in 2025	In championship since	Championship titles	Last Championship Title
Castlemagner	Castlemagner	Black and amber	Junior A	2026	4	2012
Dromtarriffe	Rathcoole	Red and white	Runners-up	2021	11	2016
Meelin	Meelin	Maroon and white	Group stage	—	5	2024
Millstreet	Millstreet	Green and yellow	Group Stage	2023	4	1992
Newmarket	Newmarket	Red and black	Champions	—	6	2025

== List of finals ==
- Q = Duhallow county qualifier

=== List of finals ===
Year	Winners		Runners-up		#
Year	Club	Score	Club	Score	#
2025	Newmarket	0–21	Dromtarriffe	0–07	
2024	Meelin	3-09	Newmarket	1-09	
2023	Newmarket	0-17	Dromtarriffe	1-10	
2022	Freemount	1-15	Newmarket	1-14	
2021	Freemount	6-13	Newmarket	1-10	
2020	Newmarket	2-14	Freemount	1-13	
2019	Freemount	4-21	Meelin	0-10	
2018	Newmarket	1-21	Meelin	3-14	
2017	Newmarket	0-18	Kilbrin	1-11	
2016	Dromtarriffe	2-12	Kilbrin	1-13	
2015	Dromtarriffe	1-17	Meelin	1-10	
2014	Dromtarriffe	0-19	Lismire	1-08	
2013	Kilbrin	0-12	Lismire	0-07	
2012	Castlemagner	0-13	Kilbrin	1-09	
2011	Meelin	2-14	Castlemagner	0-08	
2010	Millstreet	2-08	Banteer	0-06	
2009	Castlemagner	3-07	Lismire	0-14	Q
2008	Meelin	3-12	Lismire	3-06	
2007	Meelin				
2006	Castlemagner	1-09	Lismire	0-03	Q
2005	Kanturk				
2004	Lismire	2-13	Castlemagner	1-13	Q
2003	Banteer	0-11	Castlemagner	1-02	
2002	Lismire	3-07	Meelin	0-05	
2001	Kilbrin				
2000					
1999	Lismire				
1998					
1997					
1996					
1995	Banteer				
1994	Lismire	3-12	Banteer	3-07	
1993	Tullylease				
1992	Millstreet				
1991	Millstreet				
1990	Tullylease	4-16	Kilbrin	1-07	
1989					
1988					
1987	Dromtarriffe				
1986	Dromtarriffe				
1985	Dromtarriffe				
1984	Dromtarriffe		Kilbrin		
1983	Millstreet	3-12	Lismire	1-02	
1982	Kilbrin	3-08	Lismire	1-06	
1981	Dromtarriffe				
1980	Dromtarriffe				
1979	Dromtarriffe				
1978	Millstreet				
1977	Castlemagner				
1976	Kilbrin				
1975	Kilbrin				
1974	Lismire				
1965-73	No competition				
1965	Dromtarriffe				
1964	Kilbrin	2-06	Knocknagree	0-00	
1963	Meelin		Knocknagree		
1962	Newmarket				

== See also ==
- Duhallow Junior A Hurling Championship
