= Croke Rovers GAA =

Croke Rovers
- County: Cork
- Colours: Blue and white (Hurling) & Black and Amber (Football)

Playing kits
Standard colours

Croke Rovers GAA is a juvenile Gaelic Athletic Association club based in the North West of County Cork, Ireland. The club competes in Duhallow competitions. The club was formed from an amalgamation of players from Kilbrin and Castlemagner clubs and is named after Dr. Thomas Croke, the first patron of the GAA, who was born in Kilbrin and who Croke Park is named after.

== Honours ==
- Cork Minor B Hurling Championship (2) 1995, 2011
- Duhallow Under-21 Hurling Championship (2) 2012, 2013
- Duhallow Under-21 B Football Championship (2) 2014, 2021
- Duhallow Minor A Hurling Championship (4) 1991, 1995, 2008, 2009
- Duhallow Minor B Hurling Championship (1) 2011
- Duhallow Minor A Football Championship (2) 1997, 2008
- Duhallow Minor B Football Championship (1) 2003

== Noted players ==
- William Egan
