= Banteer GAA =

GAA club in County Cork

Banteer
- Baintír
- Founded: 1887
- County: Cork
- Colours: Red and white
- Grounds: Banteer Community Sportsfield

Playing kits
Standard colours

Banteer GAA is a Gaelic Athletic Association club which is based in the village of Banteer in County Cork, Ireland. The club plays hurling and is affiliated with Lyre Gaelic Football Club from the same parish. Founded in 1887, the club competes in the Duhallow Junior A Hurling Championship.

Banteer is a dual club, competing in a similar level in both football and hurling. However, the hurling team has had more success, winning the Duhallow Junior A Hurling Championship on 8 occasions. By comparison, the football team has won the Duhallow Junior A Football Championship on 3 occasions (2 under the name of Lyre). Banteer won the 2006 Duhallow Junior A Hurling Championship and lost to eventual winners Kilworth in the quarter-finals of the 2006 Cork Junior A Hurling Championship.

The club's rivals include Kanturk, Kilbrin and Dromtarriffe who are all situated close to Banteer. The club's home colours are red and white with white shorts and red socks. Having won eight Duhallow titles and runners-up on a record 13 occasions, the club is the fifth-most successful club in the championship.

== Hurling ==
The club was formed in 1887 and entered the Duhallow Championship when it was founded in 1933. Banteer won their first Duhallow Junior Hurling Championship in 1938 defeating Dromahane in the final. The club has won 8 Duhallow Championship finals and lost 13.

In 2006, Banteer defeated Freemount in the Duhallow divisional final to claim their seventh title. In the 2006 county championship, Banteer lost to Kilworth, on a scoreline of 1-06 to 2-15. Kilworth went on to win the 2006 Cork Junior A Hurling Championship.

In 2018, the club won the Duhallow championship, defeating Kilbrin. Banteer then met Seandun runners-up Brian Dillons in the first round of the 2017 Cork Junior A Hurling Championship. Banteer lost the game, 1-15 to 2-20, to a Brian Dillons side that reached the final that year.

=== List of Duhallow JAHC Finals ===
Year	Winner	Opponent
2022	Dromtarriffe 1-26	Banteer 1-13
2017	Banteer 1-17	Kilbrin 0-14
2016	Kilbrin 3-14	Banteer 0-15
2014	Kilbrin 1-17	Banteer 0-11
2012	Kilbrin 2-17	Banteer 3-12
2009	Meelin 1-15	Banteer 2-09
2008	Tullylease 2-22	Banteer 3-10
2006	Banteer 4-07	Freemount 1-14
1999	Kilbrin 1-13	Banteer 3-03
1998	Freemount 0-11	Banteer 0-02
1995	Banteer 1-12	Meelin0-13
1992	Kilbrin 2-14	Banteer 2-11
1991	Meelin 0-17	Banteer 3-05
1989	Kilbrin 1-13	Banteer 1-06
1962	Millstreet 3-12	Banteer 1-06
1957	Banteer 3-02, 9-07	Tullylease 3-02, 2-02
1956	Banteer 5-03	Newmarket 1-07
1955*	Banteer 3-03, 5-03	Millstreet 1-09, 7-12
1953	Castlemagner 2-04	Banteer 2-00
1952	Banteer 3-03	Newmarket 2-05
1938	Banteer 4-01	Dromahane 2-01
1937	Newmarket 0-00, 1-04, 2-00	Banteer 1-00, 2-01, 4-00

== Football ==
Banteer briefly fielded a football team under their name and won a Duhallow Football Championship but shortly went under the name of Lyre and won 2 more Duhallow Championships.

== Camogie ==
=== Camogie honours ===
- County Junior C League Winners (1): 2014
- County Junior C Championship Winners (1): 2014
- County Junior B Championship Winners (1): 2015
- County Junior A League Winners (1): 2016
- Minor D County Championship Winners (1): 2020

== Pitch and facilities ==
=== Facilities ===
Banteer Community Sportsfield and complex is a community owned facility in Banteer. The local GAA club, soccer club and athletics club use these facilities. The complex has a park area, 2 pitches, 2 sets of dressing rooms, several walks around the pond and pitches, a children's playgrounds, a ball wall, a museum/exhibition area with a shop and there is accessibility offered by Banteer railway station.

It is the first community-owned, full size, multi-use astro-turf pitch in Munster.

=== Main pitch ===
The original main pitch is usually used for club matches. There is a small stand which can hold up to 200 people and a clubhouse which is under the stand that's adjacent to the pitch. The clubhouse includes 4 changing rooms with showers, an equipment room and a kitchen.

The main pitch has hosted several Duhallow Championship matches and finals, including the 2021 hurling final. The pitch has also hosted a number of matches in the Cork Premier Senior Hurling Championship and the Cork Premier Senior Football Championship, most recently hosting Blackrock and Charleville in 2021.

=== Astro pitch ===
In 2020, the first phase of a €1.5million project to develop a suite of new sporting facilities in the village of Banteer was completed. In February 2020, the Banteer Community Sportsfield Project was awarded a grant under the Rural Regeneration and Development Fund. With this grant, an astro-turf pitch was built over an existing secondary pitch at the sports complex which was usually used for training.

The pitch is lined out for soccer and several soccer clubs in Duhallow use this facility as well as the local soccer club in Banteer.

== Notable players ==
Double Olympic gold medalist Dr. Pat O'Callaghan was a midfielder on the Banteer football team, while he also lined out with the Banteer hurling team. A statue was erected of Dr. "Pat" at the Banteer GAA grounds in January 2007.

== Honours ==
=== County ===
- Cork Minor B Hurling Championship
  - (gold) Winners (1): 1987

=== Duhallow ===
- Duhallow Junior A Hurling Championship
  - (gold) Winners (8): 1938, 1952, 1955, 1956, 1957, 1995, 2006, 2017
  - (silver) Runners-Up (14): 1937, 1953, 1962, 1989, 1991, 1992, 1998, 1999, 2008, 2009, 2012, 2014, 2016, 2022
- Duhallow Junior A Football Championship
  - (gold) Winners (3): 1937, 2010, 2013
  - (silver) Runners-Up (2): 2015, 2019
- Duhallow Junior B Hurling Championship
  - (gold) Winners (2): 1995, 2003
  - (silver) Runners-Up (2): 1994, 2010
- Duhallow Senior Hurling Cup
  - (gold) Winners (1): 2023
  - (silver) Runners-up (2): 2021, 2022
- Duhallow Junior A Hurling League
  - (silver) Runners-Up (1): 2023
- Duhallow Junior B Hurling League
  - (gold) Winners (1): 2022
