= Banteer =

Village in County Cork, Ireland

Banteer Bántír
- Village
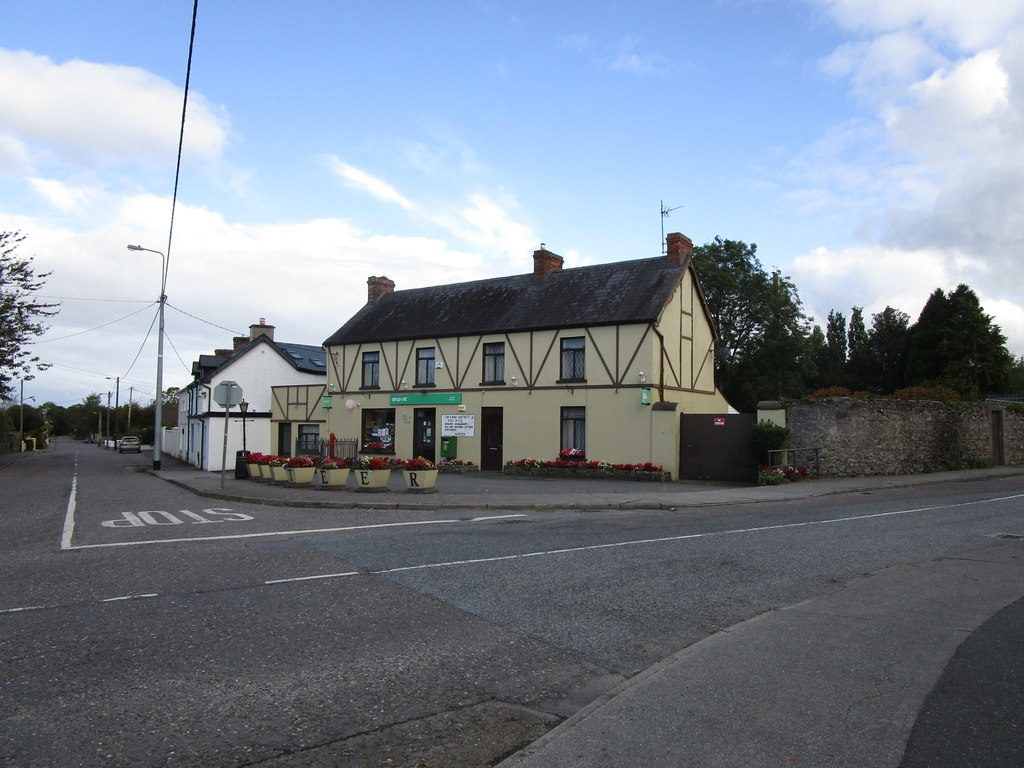
- Banteer's post office

- Location in Ireland
- Coordinates: 52°07′N 8°53′W
- Country: Ireland
- Province: Munster
- County: County Cork

Population (2022)
  - Total: 362
- Time zone: UTC+0 (WET)
  - Summer (DST): UTC-1 (IST (WEST))

Banteer (Irish: Bántír) is a village in north County Cork, Ireland located in the civil parish of Clonmeen in the historic barony of Duhallow. It is near the town of Mallow. Banteer is within the Cork North-West Dáil constituency.

== History ==
In 1651, the Battle of Knocknaclashy, the last pitched battle of the Irish Confederate Wars, took place near the village, when English Parliamentarians under Roger Boyle, 1st Earl of Orrery defeated an Irish force under Donagh MacCarthy, Viscount Muskerry.

== Organizations ==
Local sporting organizations include a Gaelic football club known simply as "Lyre" after a nearby village and a hurling club known as Banteer.

The Glen Theatre is a community-owned and managed centre for the arts. The theatre was originally Banteer National School (built 1840).

== Transport ==
Banteer railway station opened on 16 April 1853 and was closed for goods traffic on 2 September 1976. It is on the Mallow to Tralee railway line.

The Banter to Nadd road was widened and surfaced in 1838 and a large stone was placed at the roadside along the way, commemorating the ganger in charge with the inscription: "JOHN O'NEILL BROSNA 1838".

== People ==
- Áine Collins (b. 1969), former Fine Gael politician.
- Dillon Corkery (b. 1999), professional cyclist.
- Frank Crowley (1939–2022), Fine Gael politician.
- Eddie Dunbar (b. 1996), professional cyclist.
- Denis Horgan (1871–1922), Olympic shot putter.
- Conor Lane (b. 1978), Gaelic football referee.
- Pat O'Callaghan (1906–1991), Olympic gold medallist in the hammer throw, was born near Banteer and played for Banteer GAA.

== See also ==
- List of towns and villages in Ireland
