= Kilbrin =

Civil parish in County Cork, Ireland

Kilbrin Irish: Cill Bhrain
- Civil parish
- Location in Ireland
- Coordinates: 52°12′00″N 08°50′00″W
- Country: Ireland
- Province: Munster
- County: County Cork

Population (2016)
  - Total: 186
- Time zone: UTC+0 (WET)
  - Summer (DST): UTC-1 (IST (WEST))

Kilbrin (Irish: Cill Bhrain) is a civil parish in the barony of Duhallow, County Cork, Ireland. Once an independent parish, Kilbrin is now joined to the parish of Ballyclough. Kilbrin derives its name from an early church site or monastery namely Cill Bhrain, i.e. the church of Saint Bran.

Kilbrin is within the Dáil constituency of Cork North-West.

Archbishop Thomas Croke, whom Croke Park stadium was named after, was born in Castlecor (parish of Kilbrin).

== See also ==
- List of towns and villages in Ireland
- Kilbrin GAA
