= Lismire =

Village in County Cork, Ireland

Lismire Lios Maghair
- Village
- Location in Ireland
- Coordinates: 52°13′39.10″N 08°56′49.97″W
- Country: Ireland
- Province: Munster
- County: County Cork
- Time zone: UTC+0 (WET)
  - Summer (DST): UTC-1 (IST (WEST))

Lismire (Irish: Lios Maghair) is a village in the north west of County Cork, Ireland. The local Roman Catholic church is dedicated to St. Joseph and is in the parish of Kanturk (Cloyne Diocese). Lismire GAA, the local GAA club, have a number of titles to their name. Lismire is within the Dáil constituency of Cork North-West.

== See also ==
- List of towns and villages in Ireland
