= Lismire GAA =

Gaelic games club in County Cork, Ireland

Lismire
- Lios Maghair
- Founded: 1972
- County: Cork
- Colours: Black and amber
- Grounds: Lismire GAA stadium

Playing kits
Standard colours

Lismire GAA is a Gaelic Athletic Association club based in the village of Lismire in the northwest of County Cork, Ireland which forms part of the parish of Kanturk and Lismire. The club which fields teams in both Gaelic football and hurling, plays in the Duhallow division in both codes. Lismire GAA club was founded in 1972. The club purchased and developed a stadium and related facilities in the 1980s. As of 2023, Lismire compete in the Duhallow Junior B Football Championship.

== Honours ==
- Duhallow Junior A Hurling Championship (4): 1983, 1984, 1985, 1987
- Cork Junior B Hurling Championship (0): (runners-up in 2004)
- Duhallow Junior B Hurling Championship (3): 1994, 1999, 2002
- Cork Junior C Football Championship (0) (runners-up in 2021)
