= Kilbrin GAA =

Gaelic sports club in County Cork, Ireland

Kilbrin
- Cill Bhroin
- Founded: 1953
- County: Cork
- Colours
- Grounds: Fr Kelleher Park

Playing kits
Standard colours

Kilbrin GAA is a Gaelic Athletic Association club based in the village of Kilbrin in the north-west of County Cork, Ireland which forms part of the parish of Ballyclough and Kilbrin. The club plays both Gaelic Football and Hurling and is affiliated with Duhallow GAA. The club competes in the Duhallow Junior A Hurling Championship and the Duhallow Junior A Football Championship.

At under age level, an amalgamation of Kilbrin and Castlemagner as Croke Rovers has addressed an issue as neither club would have been able to field an underage team on their own. They played as Croke Rovers underage up to Minor level and in 2012 amalgamated up to U21 level. Kilbrin GAA has regular updates via their X account (Twitter) and their club lotto jackpot can be won here. You can find a collection of Kilbrin GAA matches from over the years on their YouTube page here

== Honours ==
- Cork Junior A Hurling Championship
  - (silver) Runners-Up (1): 2013
- Duhallow Junior A Hurling Championship
  - (gold) Winners (11): 1978, 1989, 1992, 1999, 2004, 2007, 2011, 2012, 2013 2014, 2016
  - (silver) Runners-Up (12): 1982, 1983, 1986, 1988, 1994, 1997, 2000, 2001, 2010, 2017, 2019, 2020
- Duhallow Junior A Hurling League
  - (gold) Winners (9): 1955, 1978, 1979, 1984, 1992, 1996, 2002, 2013, 2015, 2024
- Duhallow Cup (Hurling)
  - (gold) Winners (1): 2024
- Duhallow Junior B Hurling Championship
  - (gold) Winners (8): 1964, 1975, 1976, 1981, 1982, 1991, 2001, 2013
  - (silver) Runners-Up (5): 1984, 1990, 2012, 2016, 2017
- Duhallow Junior B Hurling League
  - (gold) Winners (4): 2011, 2012, 2013, 2016
- Duhallow U21 Hurling Championship
  - (gold) Winners (5): 1978, 1996, 1999, 2009, 2010
- Duhallow Junior B Football Championship
  - (gold) Winners (4): 2007, 2008, 2009, 2021
- Duhallow Novice Football Championship
  - (gold) Winners (1): 1955
- Duhallow U21 B Football Championship
  - (gold) Winners (1): 1995
- Duhallow U21 C Football Championship
  - (gold) Winners (2): 2006, 2007
- Cork Junior B Football Championship
  - (gold) Winners (3): 1985, 1996, 2010

== Noted players ==
- William Egan
