= Ballydesmond GAA =

Gaelic sports club in County Cork, Ireland

- Baile Deasmumhan
- Founded: 1964
- County: Cork
- Colours
- Grounds: Páirc Nóra Ní Iarlaithe
- Coordinates: 52°10′42″N 9°14′05″W

Playing kits
Standard colours

Ballydesmond GAA is a Gaelic Athletic Association club in Ballydesmond, County Cork, Ireland. The club is affiliated to the Duhallow Board and is exclusively concerned with the game of Gaelic football.

== History ==
Located in the village of Ballydesmond, on the Cork–Kerry border, Ballydesmond GAA Club was founded in 1964. When the club was formed, no agreement was reached on what county board to be affiliated with. As a result, Ballydesmond draws players, officers and members from either side of the Cork–Kerry county bounds.

Ballydesmond has spent its entire existence operating in the junior grade. The club first fielded a team in the Duhallow JAFC in 1968. Three years later in 1971, Ballydesmond claimed its first divisional title following a two-point win over Dromtarriffe. Further Duhallow JAFC titles were won in 1975, 1986 and 2007.

== Honours ==
- Duhallow Junior A Football Championship (4): 1971, 1975, 1986, 2007

== Notable players ==
- Donncha O'Connor: All-Ireland SFC–winner (2010)

== Official website ==
- Ballydesmond GAA Official website (archived 2010)
