= Cathal Vaughan =

Irish Gaelic footballer

Personal information
- Native name: Cathal Ó Macháin (Irish)
- Born: 10 January 1994 (age 32) Inchigeelagh, County Cork, Ireland
- Occupation: Part time postman
- Height: 6 ft 1 in (185 cm)

Sport
- Sport: Gaelic football
- Position: Centre-forward
Clubs
Years	Club	Apps (scores)
	Iveleary → Muskerry	lots(lots)
Club titles
- Cork titles: 0
College
- Years: College
- 2012-2016: Cork Institute of Technology
College titles
- Sigerson titles: 0
Inter-county*
Years	County	Apps (scores)
2014-2018	Cork	1 (0-00)
Inter-county titles
- Munster titles: 0
- All-Irelands: 0
- NFL: 0
- All Stars: 0
- *Inter County team apps and scores correct as of 12:03, 1 May 2021.

Cathal Vaughan (born 10 January 1994) is an Irish Gaelic footballer who plays for club side Iveleary. He has also lined out with divisional side Muskerry and at inter-county level with the Cork senior football team. He usually lines out in the forwards.

== Honours ==
Iveleary

- Mid Cork Junior A Football Championship: 2015, 2018, 2019, 2020

Cork

- McGrath Cup: 2018
- All-Ireland Junior Football Championship: 2013
- Munster Junior Football Championship: 2013
- Munster Under-21 Football Championship: 2013, 2014
