= Boherbue GAA =

Gaelic games club in County Cork, Ireland

Boherbue
- Bóthar Buí
- Founded: 1888
- County: Cork
- Colours
- Grounds: Patsy O'Sullivan Memorial Park

Playing kits
Standard colours

Boherbue GAA is a Gaelic Athletic Association club founded in 1888 and based in the village of Boherbue in the north-west of County Cork, Ireland. The club plays Intermediate A football in the Cork County Championship. At juvenile level, Boherbue is amalgamated with neighbouring club Knocknagree under the name BK Plunketts.

== Honours ==
- Cork Junior A Football Championship
  - (gold) Winners (1): 2021
  - (silver) Runners-Up (1): 2020
- Duhallow Junior A Football Championship
  - (gold) Winners (8): 1937, 1972, 1988, 2017, 2018, 2019, 2020, 2021
  - (silver) Runners-Up (11): 1936, 1944, 1967, 1973, 1981, 1982, 1983, 1984, 1990, 2001, 2008
- Duhallow Junior B Football Championship
  - (gold) Winners (2): 2014, 2020
  - (silver) Runners-Up (2): 2015, 2021
- Examiner/Ducon Cup
  - (gold) Winners (12): 1946, 1949, 1966, 1988, 1989, 2001, 2014, 2015, 2016, 2017, 2018, 2019, 2026
- Duhallow Cup
  - (gold) Winners (1): 2023, 2026
- Cork Junior A Football League
  - (gold) Winners (2): 2014, 2018,
- Cork Football League Junior A Division
  - (gold) Winners (1): 2014
- Cork County Football League Division 5
  - (gold) Winners (1): 2023
- Nevin Cup
  - (gold) Winners (8): 1962, 1968, 1971, 1976, 1978, 2015, 2018, 2021
- Duhallow Novice Football Championship
  - (gold) Winners (1): 1976
- Duhallow Minor Football Championship
  - (gold) Winners (7): 1936, 1964, 1984, 1985, 1998, 2008, 2016
- Duhallow Under-21 A Football Championship
  - (gold) Winners (2): 1987, 2016
- Duhallow Under-21 B Football Championship
  - (gold) Winners (1): 1987
- Cork Premier 2 Minor Football Championship
  - (silver) Runners-Up (1): 2012

== See also ==
- Duhallow GAA
