= Lyre GAA =

Gaelic games club in County Cork, Ireland

Lyre
- Ladhar C.L.G.
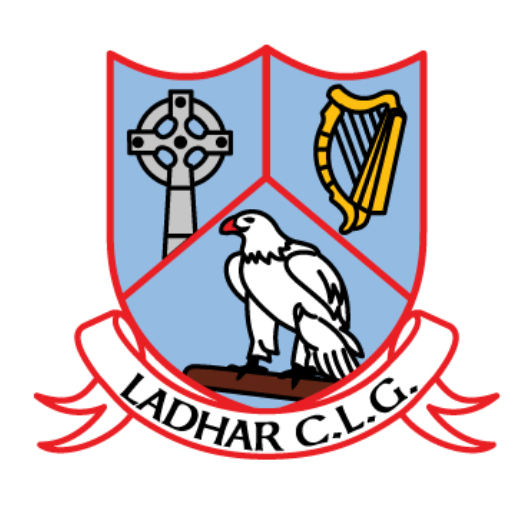
- Founded: 1899
- County: Cork
- Nickname: The Pandas
- Colours: Black & White
- Grounds: Banteer Community Sportsfield
- Coordinates: 52.2584064 -8.7752704

Playing kits
Standard colours

Lyre GAA is a Gaelic Athletic Association club which takes its name from the nearby village of Lyre, County Cork, and is based in the village of Banteer in the north-west of County Cork, Ireland. The club plays football and is affiliated with Banteer Hurling Club from the same parish. Founded in 1899, the club competes in the Duhallow Junior A Football Championship.

Their first team competes in the Duhallow Junior A Football Championship and the Duhallow Junior A Football League. In 2010, the club won its first ever Duhallow Junior A Football Championship title and won their second title in 2013. Lyre also reached the final in 2015 and 2019.

== History ==
=== Overview ===
The club was formed in 1899 and entered the Duhallow Football Championship when it was founded in 1933. Lyre won their first Duhallow Junior Football Championship in 2010 defeating rivals Kanturk in the final. They also defeated Cullen in the 2013 final.

=== Hurling ===
Lyre never fielded a hurling team as the club goes under the name of Banteer for hurling. The club has won 8 Duhallow Hurling Championships.

=== List of JAFC Finals ===
Year	Winner	Score	Opponent	Score
2019	Boherbue	3-07	Lyre	0-10
2015	Knocknagree	1-12, 1-12	Lyre	1–12, 0-04
2013	Lyre	0-13	Cullen	2-05
2010	Lyre	1-09	Kanturk	0-09

== Pitch and facilities ==
Lyres GAA play their home matches in Banteer Community Sportsfield which is based in Banteer.

=== Facilities ===
Banteer Community Sportsfield and complex is a community owned facility in Banteer. The local GAA club, soccer club and athletics club use these facilities. The complex has a park area, 2 pitches, 2 sets of dressing rooms, several walks around the pond and pitches, a children's playgrounds, a ball wall, a museum/exhibition area with a shop and there is accessibility offered by Banteer railway station.

=== Main pitch ===
The original main pitch is usually used for club matches. There is a small stand which can hold up to 200 people and a clubhouse which is under the stand that's adjacent to the pitch. The clubhouse includes 4 changing rooms with showers, an equipment room and a kitchen.

The main pitch often hosts the Duhallow Championship matches and finals, including the 2021 hurling final. The pitch has also hosted matches in the Cork Premier Senior Hurling Championship and the Cork Premier Senior Football Championship, and hosted Blackrock and Charleville in 2021.

=== Astro pitch ===
In 2020, the first phase of a €1.5million project to develop a suite of new sporting facilities in the village of Banteer was completed. In February 2020, the Banteer Community Sportsfield Project was awarded a grant under the Rural Regeneration and Development Fund. With this grant an astro-turf pitch was built over an existing secondary pitch at the sports complex which was usually used for training.

== Honours ==
=== County ===
- Cork Junior B Football Championship
  - (silver) Runners-Up (1): 2000

=== Duhallow ===
- Duhallow Junior A Football Championship
  - (gold) Winners (2): 2010, 2013
  - (silver) Runners-Up (2): 2015, 2019
- Duhallow Under 21 A Football Championship
  - (gold) Winners (1): 2010
- Duhallow Junior B Football League
  - (gold) Winners (2): 1999, 2010
- Duhallow Co Qualifier Championship
  - (gold) Winners (5): 2000, 2001, 2004, 2005, 2006
- Duhallow Junior B Football Championship
  - (gold) Winners (2): 2004, 2006
- Duhallow Minor B Football Championship
  - (gold) Winners (1): 1999, 2006
- Duhallow Minor B Football League
  - (gold) Winners (1): 1999

== Notable players ==
- Double Olympic gold medalist Dr. Pat O'Callaghan was a midfielder for the football team, while he also lined out with the Banteer hurling team. A statue was erected of Dr. "Pat" at the Banteer GAA grounds in January 2007.
