= Duhallow GAA =

Gaelic sports club in County Cork, Ireland

Duhallow
- Dúiche Ealla
- County: Cork
- Colours: Orange & Black

Playing kits
Standard colours

Senior Club Championships
| | All Ireland | Munster champions | Cork champions |
|---|---|---|---|
| Football: | 0 | 0 | 3 |

Duhallow GAA is a Gaelic football and hurling division in the historical barony of Duhallow, County Cork, Ireland. This barony is situated in the northwest region of the county, and includes towns such as Kanturk, Millstreet, and Newmarket. It is one of eight divisions of Cork County Board. It organizes competitions for the clubs within the division, from Under 12 up to the adult level. The winners of these competitions compete against other divisional champions to determine which club is the county champion. In addition, the division selects football and hurling teams from the adult teams playing at junior level or county intermediate level, and these then compete for the Cork Senior Football Championship and Cork Senior Hurling Championship. Since hurling is the weaker sport in the division, a divisional team has also participated in the Cork Minor Hurling Championship and Cork Under-21 Hurling Championship.

== Honours ==
=== Football ===
- Cork Senior Football Championship
  - (gold) Winners (3): 1936 (as Duhallow West), 1990, 1991
  - (silver) Runners-Up (8): 1928, 1937, 1982, 1988, 1998, 2012, 2018, 2019

=== Hurling ===
- Cork Under-21 Hurling Championships
  - (gold) Winners (2): 1982, 2009
  - (silver) Runners-Up (5): 2008, 2010, 2011, 2012, 2015
- Cork Minor Hurling Championship
  - (silver) Runners-Up (1): 2008

== Member clubs ==
- Ballydesmond
- Banteer
- Boherbue
- Castlemagner
- Cullen
- Dromtarriffe
- Freemount
- Glenlara
- Kanturk
- Kilbrin
- Kiskeam
- Knocknagree
- Lismire
- Lyre
- Meelin
- Millstreet
- Newmarket
- Rockchapel
- St Johns
- Tullylease

=== Juvenile amalgamations ===
- BK Plunketts (Boherbue and Knocknagree)
- Duarigle Gaels (Cullen and Millstreet)
- Croke Rovers (Castlemagner and Kilbrin)
- Sliabh Luachra Gaels (Ballydesmond and Kiskeam)
- St Mark's (Freemount and Meelin)
- St. Peters (Freemount and Rockchapel)

== Divisional competitions ==
| Competition | Year | Champions | Runners-up |
Championship
| Duhallow Junior A Football Championship | 2025 | Castlemagner | Kanturk |
| Duhallow Junior A Hurling Championship | 2025 | Newmarket | Dromtarriffe |
| Duhallow Junior B Football Championship | 2025 | Kiskeam | Rockchapel |
| Duhallow Junior B Hurling Championship | 2025 | Newmarket | Dromtarriffe |
| Duhallow Junior C Football Championship | 2025 | St John's | Ballydesmond |
U21 Championship
| Duhallow U21A Football Championship | 2024 | Duarigle Gaels | Croke Rovers |
| Duhallow U21A Hurling Championship | 2023 | Kanturk / Lismire | Newmarket |
| Duhallow U21B Football Championship | 2024 | Sliabh Luachra Gaels | St Peter’s |
| Duhallow U21B Hurling Championship | 2024 | Croke Rovers | Newmarket |
| Duhallow U21C Football Championship | 2024 | Lyre | Duarigle Gaels |
League
| Duhallow Junior A Football League | 2025 | Knocknagree | Kiskeam |
| Duhallow Junior A Hurling League | 2025 | Dromtarriffe | Kilbrin |
| Duhallow Junior B Football League | 2025 | Kanturk | Cullen |
| Duhallow Junior B Hurling League | 2024 | Newmarket | Meelin |
Cup
| Duhallow Cup | 2023 | Boherbue | Ballydesmond |
| Duhallow Senior Hurling Cup | 2025 | Dromtarriffe | Kilbrin |

== Hurling ==
=== Grades ===
| Championship | Club |
Senior Championships
| Premier Senior | Duhallow |
| Premier Senior | Kanturk |
| Senior A | None |
Intermediate Championships
| Premier Intermediate | None |
| Intermediate A | None |
Junior Championships
| Premier Junior | None |
| Junior A | Banteer |
| Junior A | Dromtarriffe |
| Junior A | Freemount |
| Junior A | Kilbrin |
| Junior A | Meelin |
| Junior A | Newmarket |
| Junior A | Millstreet |
| Junior B | Castlemagner |
| Junior B | Dromtarriffe (2) |
| Junior B | Kanturk (2) |
| Junior B | Meelin (2) |
| Junior B | Millstreet (2) |
| Junior B | Newmarket (2) |
U21 Championship
| Under 21 | Croke Rovers |
| Under 21 | Kanturk |
| Under 21 | Millstreet |
| Under 21 | Newmarket |
| Under 21 | St Mark's |

== Football ==
=== 2027 Championship Grades ===
| Championship | Club |
Senior
| Premier Senior | Duhallow |
| Premier Senior | Kanturk |
| Premier Senior | Knocknagree |
| Senior A | Newmarket |
Intermediate
| Premier Intermediate | Kiskeam |
| Premier Intermediate | Rockchapel |
| Intermediate A | Boherbue |
| Intermediate A | Dromtarriffe |
Junior
| Premier Junior | Cullen |
| Premier Junior | Millstreet |
| Junior A | Ballydesmond |
| Junior A | Castlemagner |
| Junior A | Kanturk (2) |
| Junior A | Kilbrin |
| Junior A | Knocknagree (2) |
| Junior A | Lismire |
| Junior A | Lyre |
| Junior A | Rockchapel (2) |
| Junior B | Boherbue (2) |
| Junior B | Castlemagner (2) |
| Junior B | Cullen (2) |
| Junior B | Dromtarriffe (2) |
| Junior B | Kiskeam (2) |
| Junior B | Millstreet (2) |
| Junior B | Newmarket (2) |
| Junior B | St John's |
| Junior C | Ballydesmond (2) |
| Junior C | Freemount |
| Junior C | St John's (2) |
| Junior C | Tullylease |
Under 21
| U21 BFC | BK Plunketts |
| U21 BFC | Croke Rovers |
| U21 BFC | Duarigle Gaels |
| U21 BFC | Robert Emmets |
| U21 BFC | Sliabh Luachra |
| U21 CFC | Dromtarriffe |
| U21 CFC | Cullen |
| U21 CFC | Kanturk |
| U21 CFC | St Peter's |
