= Cullen GAA =

Gaelic Athletic Association club

Cullen
- Cuileann Uí Chaoimh
- Founded: 1933
- County: Cork
- Colours
- Grounds: Páirc Laitairain

Playing kits
Standard colours

Cullen GAA is a Gaelic Athletic Association club in Cullen, County Cork, Ireland. The club is affiliated to the Duhallow Board and is exclusively concerned with the game of Gaelic football.

== History ==
Located in the village of Cullen, on the Cork–Kerry border, Cullen GAA Club was founded in 1933, as a result of the establishment of the divisional Duhallow Board. Pat O'Callaghan, the double Olympic gold medallist, was the first president of the club. Cullen has spent its entire existence operating in the junior grade. The club was in its formative years when Duhallow JAFC titles were won in 1936 and 1939.

Cullen fell into decline in the decades that followed, however, in 1959 a move was made to re-establish the club. This initiative succeeded, with Cullen going on to win a third Duhallow JAFC title in 1967. The new century saw the club win further divisional titles in 2004, 2006 and 2008. Cullen won its seventh Duhallow JAFC title after a 4–16 to 1–02 defeat of Kanturk in 2022.

== Honours ==
- Duhallow Junior A Football Championship (7): 1936, 1939, 1967, 2004, 2006, 2008, 2022
- Ducon Cup (2): 2021, 2022
- Cork county division 7 league (1): 2024

== Notable players ==
- Luke Murphy
- Batt O'Keeffe
