= Aghinagh GAA =

GAA club in Cork, Ireland

Aghinagh
- Achadh Eichneach
- Founded: 1949
- County: Cork
- Colours: Blue and white
- Grounds: Rusheen
- Coordinates: 51.939°N 8.905°W

Playing kits
Standard colours

Senior Club Championships
	All Ireland	Munster champions	Cork champions
Football:	0	0	0

Aghinagh GAA is a Gaelic Athletic Association club located in the village of Rusheen, County Cork, Ireland. The club, which fields teams in Gaelic football, spans the parishes of Rusheen, Ballinagree, Bealmorrive and parts of Carrigadrohid.

== History ==
Although there is reference to a team from Aghinagh taking part in the Cork Senior Hurling Championship in the 1890s, the club in its current form was founded in January 1949. The club was originally called St. Augustine's and adopted royal blue and white as their official colours. A juvenile section of the club was established in 1969. In the early years of its existence, Aghinagh depended on the goodwill of farmers to provide suitable fields for pitches. In 1984, the club bought six and a half acres of land near the village of Rusheen. In subsequent years this site was developed and dressing rooms were built. The pitch was officially opened in 1988.

The club's Junior A footballers, having reached the final of the Mid Cork Junior A Football Championship on several previous occasions, won their title in 2021. In that final, held on 2 November 2021, Aghinagh beat Ballincollig on a scoreline of 1-12 to 0-9.

== Honours ==
- Mid Cork Junior A Football Championship (2): 2021, 2026
