= Castlemagner GAA =

Irish Gaelic Athletic Association club

Castlemagner
- Caisleán na Maignéir
- Founded: 1900
- County: Cork
- Nickname: Castle
- Colours: Black and Amber
- Grounds: Castlemagner GAA

Playing kits
Standard colours

Castlemagner GAA is a Gaelic Athletic Association club based in the village of Castlemagner in the north-west of County Cork, Ireland. Founded in 1900, the club plays both hurling and Gaelic football and is affiliated with Duhallow GAA. As of 2023, the club competes in the Duhallow Junior A Hurling Championship and the Duhallow Junior A Football Championship.

At under age level, the Castlemagner club amalgamates with Kilbrin as Croke Rovers - as neither club have been able to field an underage team on their own. Ladies' Gaelic football and camogie are also played within the club.

== Honours ==
- Cork Junior A Hurling Championship (1): 1954
- Cork Junior A Football Championship (2): 1947, 1952
- Cork Junior B Hurling Championship (1): 2012 (runners-up in 2007)
- Duhallow Junior A Hurling Championship (5): 1951, 1953, 1954, 1960, 2015
- Duhallow Junior A Football Championship (10): 1947, 1948, 1952, 1957, 1960, 1961, 2023, 2024, 2025, 2026
- Duhallow Junior B Football Championship (4): 1980, 1989, 1991, 1999
- Duhallow Junior B Hurling Championship (1): 2012

== Notable players ==
- Mattie McAuliffe
- Pat O'Callaghan
