= 1895 Cork Junior Football Championship =

- Champions: William O'Briens (1st title)
- Runners-up: Dromtarriffe

The 1895 Cork Junior Hurling Championship was the inaugural staging of the Cork Junior Hurling Championship since its establishment by the Cork County Board.

The final was played on 13 October 1895 at the Town Park in Mallow, between William O'Briens and Dromtarriffe. William O'Briens won the match by 0–04 to 0–01 to claim their first ever championship title in the grade.

== Results ==
=== Final ===
13 October 1895 Final	William O'Briens	0–04 – 0–01	Dromtarriffe	Mallow Town Park
				Referee: J Nagle
