= 2022 Cork Intermediate A Football Championship =

- Dates: 21 July - 23 October 2022
- Teams: 16
- Sponsor: Bon Secours Hospital
- Champions: Kilshannig (2nd title); Killian O'Hanlon (captain); Richie Ryan (manager)
- Runners-up: Aghabullogue; Paul Ring (captain); Robert O'Keeffe (manager)
- Relegated: Ballydesmond; Millstreet; St. Finbarr's; St. Nicholas'

Tournament statistics
- Matches played: 31
- Goals scored: 60 (1.94 per match)
- Points scored: 665 (21.45 per match)
- Top scorer(s): David Thompson (7-27)

The 2022 Cork Intermediate A Football Championship was the 87th staging of the Cork Intermediate A Football Championship since its establishment by the Cork County Board in 1909. The draw for the group stage placings took place on 8 February 2022. The championship ran from 21 July to 23 October 2022.

The final was played on 23 October 2022 at Páirc Uí Chaoimh in Cork, between Kilshannig and Aghabullogue, in what was their first ever meeting in the final. Kilshannig won the match by 1–16 to 0–10 to claim their second championship title overall and a first title in 34 years.

Aghabullogue' David Thompson was the championship's top scorer with 7-27.

== Team changes ==
=== To Championship ===
Promoted from the Cork Junior A Football Championship

- Boherbue

Relegated from the Cork Premier Intermediate Football Championship

- St. Nicholas'

=== From Championship ===
Promoted to the Cork Premier Intermediate Football Championship

- Iveleary

Relegated to the South East Junior A Football Championship

- Kinsale

== Group A ==
=== Group A table ===
Advanced to knockout stage Relegated

| Team | Matches | | | | Score | | | Pts |
| Team | Pld | W | D | L | For | Against | Diff | Pts |
|---|---|---|---|---|---|---|---|---|
| Adrigole | 3 | 2 | 0 | 1 | 47 | 30 | 17 | 4 |
| Kilshannig | 3 | 2 | 0 | 1 | 47 | 33 | 14 | 4 |
| Gabriel Rangers | 3 | 2 | 0 | 1 | 49 | 39 | 10 | 4 |
| Ballydesmond | 3 | 0 | 0 | 3 | 30 | 71 | -41 | 0 |

=== Group A results ===
| 23 July 2022 Round 1 | Kilshannig | 3-18 - 0-07 | Ballydesmond | Banteer Sportsfield |
| | K Twomey 1-5 (0-2f, 0-1 45'), O O'Sullivan 2-0, T Cunningham 0-3 (0-2f), C O'Sullivan 0-2, J Kearney 0-2, Darragh O'Sullivan 0-2, D Guiney 0-1, E Healy 0-1, K O'Connell 0-1, Diarmuid O'Sullivan 0-1. | Report | Donnacha O'Connor 0-4 (0-3f), B O'Leary 0-1, K O'Connell 0-1, D Moynihan 0-1. |

| 24 July 2022 Round 1 | Gabriel Rangers | 2-08 - 0-12 | Adrigole | St. Colum's Grounds |
| | J O’Brien 2-0 (2 pens); M Cronin 0-4 (1f); E Goggin 0-2; K O’Brien, K O’Driscoll 0-1 each. | Report | D Harrington 0-4 (1f); J Harrington 0-3; C O’Shea 0-2; N O’Sullivan, C O’Sullivan, S O’Shea (1f) 0-1 each. |

| 14 August 2022 Round 2 | Kilshannig | 0-09 - 1-13 | Adrigole | Kilmichael Grounds |
| | K Twomey 0-3 (0-2f), J Twomey 0-3, C O'Sullivan 0-2, Darragh O'Sullivan 0-1. | Report | D Harrington 0-5 (0-1f 0-1 pen), G Shea 1-1, Cian O'Shea 0-2 (0-1 ',mark'), S Shea 0-2 (0-1f), J Harrington 0-1, C O'Sullivan 0-1, Connie Shea 0-1. |

| 14 August 2022 Round 2 | Ballydesmond | 1-13 - 3-16 | Gabriel Rangers | Ballingeary Grounds |
| | Donncha O’Connor 0-8 (6f), P Breen 1-0, M Collins 0-1; S Cronin 0-1, K O’Connell 0-1, D Hayes 0-1, N Fleming 0-1. | Report | J O’Regan 2-2 (1-0p, 0-2f), M Cronin 0-8 (3f), G O’Callaghan 1-2, K O’Driscoll 0-3, C O’Brien 0-1. |

| 3 September 2022 Round 3 | Kilshannig | 0-11 - 0-10 | Gabriel Rangers | Kilmichael Grounds |
| | K Twomey 0-5 f, E O’Hanlon 0-2, T Cunningham, C O’Shea, J Twomey, C McMahon 0-1 each. | Report | J O’Regan 0-4 (0-1 f), M Cronin 0-3 (0-1 f), G O’Callaghan 0-2, K O’Brien 0-1. |

| 3 September 2022 Round 3 | Ballydesmond | 0-07 - 2-13 | Adrigole | Inchigeela Grounds |
| | Donnacha O'Connor 0-5, N Fleming 0-1, D Hayes 0-1. | | D Harrington 1-8, G Shea 1-0, S Shea 0-3, C O'Sullivan 0-2. |

== Group B ==
=== Group B table ===
Advanced to knockout stage Relegated

| Team | Matches | | | | Score | | | Pts |
| Team | Pld | W | D | L | For | Against | Diff | Pts |
|---|---|---|---|---|---|---|---|---|
| Kildorrery | 3 | 2 | 1 | 0 | 36 | 28 | 8 | 5 |
| Glanworth | 3 | 2 | 0 | 1 | 39 | 30 | 9 | 4 |
| Glenville | 3 | 1 | 1 | 1 | 31 | 36 | -5 | 3 |
| St. Nicholas' | 3 | 1 | 0 | 2 | 37 | 49 | -12 | 2 |

=== Group B results ===
| 21 July 2022 Round 1 | St. Nicholas' | 4-08 - 1-13 | Glanworth | Páirc Gleann an Phréacháin |
| | D Milner 1-1, R Long 1-1 (0-1f), L Quilligan 1-0, D Brosnan 0-3 (0-1f), S O'Callaghan 0-2 (0-1f), R Downey 0-1. | Report | D O'Brien 1-6 (0-2f), D Pyne 0-3 (0-1 '45, 0-1f), S Finn 0-1, G O'Neill 0-1, S Condon 0-1, S O'Riordan 0-1. |

| 22 July 2022 Round 1 | Glenville | 0-12 - 0-12 | Kildorrery | Mill Field |
| | S Desmond 0-4, J Cooke 0-4 (0-2f), K O'Neill 0-1, J Dennehy 0-1, B Lehane 0-1, S Curtin 0-1. | Report | J O'Gorman 0-4 (0-2f), J Keating 0-3, A Crowley 0-2 (0-1 '45'), D Kent 0-1, J McEniry 0-1, P O'Brien 0-1. |

| 12 August 2022 Round 2 | Glanworth | 2-08 - 0-05 | Glenville | Bride Rovers Park |
| | D Pyne 1-4 (0-1f, 0-1 '45'), P Blackburne 1-1, D O'Brien 0-2 (0-1f), J Walsh 0-1. | Report | C O'Keeffe 0-2f, J Cooke 0-2, S Desmond 0-1 (mark). |

| 14 August 2022 Round 2 | St. Nicholas' | 0-07 - 2-13 | Kildorrery | Páirc Gleann an Phréacháin |
| | S O'Callaghan 0-3 (0-2f), S Horgan 0-1, E Downey 0-1, D Morris 0-1, L Coughlan 0-1. | Report | J O'Gorman 0-6, P O'Brien 1-2, L Keating 1-0, D McNamara 0-1, A Crowley 0-1 '45', K Hurley 0-1, W Fouhy 0-1, J O'Sullivan 0-1. |

| 3 September 2022 Round 3 | St. Nicholas' | 0-10 - 1-11 | Glenville | Páirc Uí Rinn |
| | | Report |

| 3 September 2022 Round 3 | Glanworth | 0-09 - 0-05 | Kildorrery | Araglen Grounds |
| | D Pyne 0-4, J O'Sullivan 0-2, M Sheehan 0-2, D O'Brien 0-1. | | J O'Gorman 0-3, A Crowley 0-1, W Fouhy 0-1. |

== Group C ==
=== Group C table ===
Advance to knockout stage Advance to relegation play-off

| Team | Matches | | | | Score | | | Pts |
| Team | Pld | W | D | L | For | Against | Diff | Pts |
|---|---|---|---|---|---|---|---|---|
| Mitchelstown | 3 | 2 | 1 | 0 | 62 | 31 | 31 | 5 |
| Boherbue | 3 | 2 | 1 | 0 | 48 | 37 | 11 | 5 |
| Glanmire | 3 | 0 | 1 | 2 | 31 | 46 | -15 | 1 |
| Millstreet | 3 | 0 | 1 | 2 | 27 | 54 | -27 | 1 |

=== Group C results ===
| 24 July 2022 Round 1 | Boherbue | 1-10 - 0-10 | Glanmire | O'Connell Park |
| | D O’Connor 0-5 (0-2f), J O’Sullivan 1-1; J O’Connor 0-3 (0-2f), Andrew O’Connor 0-1. | Report | C McCarthy 0-4, J Crowley 0-3, D Molden 0-2f. |

| 24 July 2022 Round 1 | Mitchelstown | 2-18 - 0-05 | Millstreet | Dr. Croke Park |
| | C O'Mahony 2-5 (0-2f), S Cahill 0-3, P Magee 0-2, J Sheehan 0-2 (0-1f), S Beston 0-2, S Walsh 0-1, D Dineen 0-1, J O'Sullivan 0-1, A O'Brien 0-1f. | Report | M Vaughan 0-2f, D Buckley 0-1, T Walsh 0-1f, D O'Donovan 0-1. |

| 13 August 2022 Round 2 | Mitchelstown | 2-16 - 0-10 | Glanmire | Páirc Lios gCúl |
| | C O'Mahony 2-7 (0-5f), S Beston 0-3, S Walsh 0-2, D Dineen 0-1, J O'Sullivan 0-1, J Sheehan 0-1. | Report | D Molden 0-4, J Crowley 0-4 (0-3f), C McCarthy 0-1. |

| 13 August 2022 Round 2 | Millstreet | 0-11 - 2-13 | Boherbue | Cullen Grounds |
| | M Vaughan 0-5 (4f), T Sheehan 0-2, D Cashman 0-1, S Hickey 0-1, M Murphy 0-1, D Murphy 0-1. | Report | J O'Connor 1-5 (0-3f), D O'Connor 0-4, A Murphy 1-0, G O'Sullivan 0-3; Andrew O'Connor 0-1, |

| 3 September 2022 Round 3 | Millstreet | 1-08 - 1-08 | Glanmire | Carrigadrohid Grounds |
| | M Vaughan 1-4, S Hickey 0-2, C O'Leary 0-1, K Crowley 0-1. | | J Crowley 0-6, L Hackett 1-1, C McCarthy 0-1. |

| 3 September 2022 Round 3 | Mitchelstown | 2-10 - 0-16 | Boherbue | Fr. Con Buckley Park |
| | S Beston 1-1, C Hyland 1-0, J Sheehan 0-3, S O'Mahony 0-3, A O'Brien 0-3. | | J O'Connor 0-7, D O'Connor 0-4, Andrew O'Connor 0-2, Alan O'Connor 0-1, J Corkery 0-1, G O'Sullivan 0-1. |

== Group D ==
=== Group D table ===
Advanced to knockout stage Relegated

| Team | Matches | | | | Score | | | Pts |
| Team | Pld | W | D | L | For | Against | Diff | Pts |
|---|---|---|---|---|---|---|---|---|
| Aghabullogue | 3 | 3 | 0 | 0 | 56 | 34 | 22 | 6 |
| Dromtarriffe | 3 | 1 | 0 | 2 | 41 | 33 | 8 | 2 |
| Ballinora | 3 | 1 | 0 | 2 | 32 | 46 | -14 | 2 |
| St. Finbarr's | 3 | 1 | 0 | 2 | 29 | 45 | -16 | 2 |

=== Group D results ===
| 22 July 2022 Round 1 | Aghabullogue | 0-12 - 0-07 | Dromtarriffe | Páirc Eoin Mhic Charthaigh |
| | M Bradley 0-4, D Thompson 0-4, Evan O'Sullivan 0-3 (0-1'45, 0-1f), S O'Connell 0-1. | Report | C O'Callaghan 0-2f; E Murphy 0-2 (0-1'45, 0-1f), A Buckley 0-1, D O'Keeffe 0-1, K O'Sullivan 0-1. |

| 24 July 2022 Round 1 | Ballinora | 0-03 - 0-10 | St. Finbarr's | Ballincollig Grounds |

| 13 August 2022 Round 2 | Aghabullogue | 4-08 - 0-13 | St. Finbarr's | Ballyanley Grounds |

| 14 August 2022 Round 2 | Dromtarriffe | 1-09 - 2-09 | Ballinora | Páirc Eoin Mhic Charthaigh |
| | C O'Callaghan 1-4, E Murphy 0-2 (0-1f), J Kelleher 0-1, D O'Connor 0-1, D O'Keeffe 0-1. | Report | D Corkery 2-1, N Lordan 0-4f, D Holmes 0-2. |

| 3 September 2022 Round 3 | Dromtarriffe | 1-19 - 0-06 | St. Finbarr's | Páirc Eoin Mic Chárthaigh |
| | D O'Keeffe 1-3, C O'Callaghan 0-4, K O'Sullivan 0-3, E Murphy 0-3, M Healy 0-1, J Kelleher 0-1, B O'Keeffe 0-1. | | I O'Callaghan 0-2, A Murphy 0-2, L Hennigan 0-1, F O'Shea 0-1. |

| 3 September 2022 Round 3 | Aghabullogue | 3-15 - 0-14 | Ballinora | Ovens Grounds |

== Knockout stage ==
=== Bracket ===
Quarter-Finals
Glanworth (Avondhu) | 1-08
Kilshannig (Avondhu) | 1-12
Mitchelstown (Avondhu) | 1-09
Dromtarriffe (Duhallow) | 0-11
Adrigole (Beara) | 1-14
Boherbue (AET) (Duhallow) | 1-15
Aghabullogue (Muskerry) | 3-09
Kildorrery (Avondhu) | 1-10

Semi-Finals
Kilshannig (Avondhu) | 2-15
Mitchelstown (Avondhu) | 0-09
Boherbue (Duhallow) | 1-07
Aghabullogue (Muskerry) | 4-10

Final
Kilshannig (Avondhu) | 1-16
Aghabullogue (Muskerry) | 0-10

=== Quarter-finals ===
| 17 September 2022 Quarter-final | Glanworth | 1-08 - 1-12 | Kilshannig | Kildorrery Grounds |
| | D O'Brien 1-3 (0-1 f), D Pyne 0-5 (0-1 f, 0-1 45). | Report | K O'Hanlon 0-4 (0-2 f) D O'Sullivan 1-0, T Cunningham 0-3, B Guerin 0-2, K Twomey 0-2 f, J Twomey 0-1. | Referee: E Coleman (Youghal) |

| 17 September 2022 Quarter-final | Mitchelstown | 1-09 - 0-11 | Dromtarriffe | Kanturk Grounds |
| | C O’Mahony 0-5 (0-4 f), S Beston 1-0, S Walsh 0-2, M Keane 0-1, D Reidy-Price 0-1. | Report | C O’Callaghan 0-5 (0-1 f), K O’Sullivan 0-1, B O’Keeffe 0-1, E Murphy 0-1 (0-1f), M Healy 0-1, T Howard 0-1, D O’Connor 0-1. | Referee: C Nolan (Bishopstown) |

| 18 September 2022 Quarter-final | Adrigole | 1-14 - 1-15 (aet) | Boherbue | Ballingeary Grounds |
| | David Harrington 0-6 (0-3 f), G Shea 1-1, S Shea 0-2 f, S O’Sullivan, C O’Sullivan, C Carey, C O’Shea 0-1 each. | Report | J O’Connor 1-3 (0-1 f), D O’Connor 0-4 (0-1 f), G O’Sullivan 0-3, J Corkery 0-2, B Murphy, L Moynihan, D McCarthy 0-1 each. |

| 18 September 2022 Quarter-final | Aghabullogue | 3-09 - 1-10 | Kildorrery | Mallow GAA Complex |
| | D Thompson 2-5 (1-0 pen, 0-3 f), B Dineen 1-0, E O’Sullivan, C O’Sullivan, J Corkery, N Barry Murphy 0-1 each. | Report | J O’Gorman 1-6 (0-5 f), J O’Sullivan, S Fitzgerald, W Fouhy, P O’Brien 0-1 each. |

=== Semi-finals ===
| 1 October 2022 Semi-final | Kilshannig | 2-15 - 0-09 | Mitchelstown | Páirc Mac Gearailt |
| | K Twomey 0-6, 3f, C McMahon 1-2, K O’Hanlon 1-1, E O’Hanlon and D O’Sullivan 0-2 each, E O’Sullivan 0-1, T Cunningham 0-1f. | Report | C O’Mahony 0-3, 2f, 0-1’45, S Beston 0-2, J Sheehan 0-2, 1f, S O’Sullivan and J Mullins 0-1 each. | Referee: C Dineen (Douglas) |

| 1 October 2022 Semi-final | Aghabullogue | 4-10 - 1-07 | Boherbue | Millstreet Grounds |
| | D Thompson 2-3 (1-0p, 0-2f), C O’Sullivan (1-2), J Corkery (1-1), M Bradley 0-2 (0-1f), R Dennehy, P O’Sullivan 0-1 each. | Report | D O’Connor 0-4 (0-3f), J O’Connor 0-3 (0-2f), G O’Sullivan (1-0). | Referee: R Whelan (Aghada) |

=== Final ===
| 23 October 2022 Final | Kilshannig | 1-16 - 0-10 | Aghabullogue | Páirc Uí Chaoimh |
| | T Cunningham 1-5 (0-1 f), K Twomey 0-4 (0-2 f, 0-2 45), K O’Hanlon, D O’Sullivan 0-2 each, C O’Sullivan, É O'Hanlon, K Murphy 0-1 each. | Report | D Thompson 0-6 (0-5 f), J Corkery 0-2, C O’Sullivan, P O’Sullivan 0-2 each. | Referee: C Walsh (Nemo Rangers) |

== Championship Statistics ==
=== Top scorers ===
Overall

| Rank | Player | Club | Tally | Total | Matches | Average |
|---|---|---|---|---|---|---|
| 1 | David Thompson | Aghabullogue | 7-27 | 48 | 6 | 8.00 |
| 2 | Cathail O'Mahony | Mitchelstown | 4-25 | 37 | 5 | 7.40 |
| 3 | Kieran Twomey | Kilshannig | 1-25 | 28 | 6 | 4.66 |
| 4 | Jerry O'Connor | Boherbue | 2-21 | 27 | 5 | 5.40 |
| 5 | David Harrington | Adrigole | 1-21 | 24 | 4 | 6.00 |
| 6 | Jamie O'Gorman | Kildorrery | 1-19 | 22 | 4 | 5.50 |
| 7 | David O'Connor | Boherbue | 0-21 | 21 | 5 | 4.20 |
| 8 | Conor O'Callaghan | Dromtarriffe | 1-17 | 20 | 4 | 5.00 |
| 9 | David Pyne | Glanworth | 1-16 | 19 | 4 | 4.75 |
| 10 | James O'Regan | Gabriel Rangers | 4-06 | 18 | 3 | 6.00 |
| 10 | Darragh O'Brien | Glanworth | 2-12 | 18 | 4 | 4.50 |
| 10 | Donnacha O'Connor | Ballydesmond | 0-18 | 18 | 3 | 6.00 |

In a single game

| Rank | Player | Club | Tally | Total | Opposition |
|---|---|---|---|---|---|
| 1 | Cathail O'Mahony | Mitchelstown | 2-07 | 13 | Glanmire |
| 2 | Cathail O'Mahony | Mitchelstown | 2-05 | 11 | Millstreet |
| 2 | David Thompson | Aghabullogue | 2-05 | 11 | Kildorrery |
| 2 | David Thompson | Aghabullogue | 1-08 | 11 | Ballinora |
| 5 | David Thompson | Aghabullogue | 2-03 | 9 | Boherbue |
| 5 | Darragh O'Brien | Glanworth | 1-06 | 9 | St. Nicholas' |
| 5 | Jamie O'Gorman | Kildorrery | 1-06 | 9 | Aghabullogue |
| 5 | David Harrington | Adrigole | 1-06 | 9 | Ballydesmond |
| 9 | James O'Regan | Gabriel Rangers | 2-02 | 8 | Ballydesmond |
| 9 | Kieran Twomey | Kilshannig | 1-05 | 8 | Ballydesmond |
| 9 | Tom Cunningham | Kilshannig | 1-05 | 8 | Aghabullogue |
| 9 | Jerry O'Connor | Boherbue | 1-05 | 8 | Millstreet |
| 9 | Mark Cronin | Gabriel Rangers | 0-08 | 8 | Ballydesmond |
| 9 | Donnacha O'Connor | Ballydesmond | 0-08 | 8 | Gabriel Rangers |
