= 2023 Cork Intermediate A Football Championship =

88th staging of the Cork Intermediate A Football Championship

- Dates: 26 July - 5 November 2023
- Teams: 12
- Sponsor: Bon Secours Hospital
- Champions: Aghabullogue (1st title); Paul Ring (captain); Robert O'Keeffe (manager)
- Runners-up: Mitchelstown; Shane Cahill (captain); Ricky Ronayne (manager)
- Relegated: Glenville

Tournament statistics
- Matches played: 24
- Goals scored: 51 (2.13 per match)
- Points scored: 493 (20.54 per match)
- Top scorer(s): Blake Murphy (3-19)

The 2023 Cork Intermediate A Football Championship was the 88th staging of the Cork Intermediate A Football Championship since its establishment by the Cork County Board in 1909. The draw for the group stage placings took place on 11 December 2022. The championship ran from 26 July to 5 November 2023.

The final was played on 5 November 2023 at Páirc Uí Chaoimh in Cork, between Aghabullogue and Mitchelstown, in what was their first ever meeting in the final. Aghabullogue won the match by 2–13 to 1–15 to claim their first ever championship title.

Blake Murphy was the championship's top scorer with 3-19.

== Team changes ==
=== To Championship ===
Relegated from the Cork Premier Intermediate Football Championship

- St. Vincent's

=== From Championship ===
Promoted to the Cork Premier Intermediate Football Championship

- Kilshannig

Relegated to the Cork Premier Junior Football Championship

- Ballydesmond
- Millstreet
- St. Finbarr's
- St. Nicholas'

== Group A ==
=== Group A table ===
Knockout stage

Team	Matches				Score			Pts
Team	Pld	W	D	L	For	Against	Diff	Pts
Dromtarriffe	3	2	0	1	49	52	-3	4
St. Vincent's	3	2	0	1	47	44	3	4
Glanmire	3	1	0	2	52	56	-4	2
Glanworth	3	1	0	2	40	36	4	2

=== Group A results ===
29 July 2023 Round 1	St Vincent's	2-06 - 0-09	Glanworth	Páirc Lios gCúl
	B Murphy 0-4, K O'Connor 1-0, B Hornibrook 1-0, J Price 0-1, C O'Neill 0-1.		D Pyne 0-6, D O'Brien 0-1, J O'Sullivan 0-1, M Sheehan 0-1.	Referee: B Murphy (Carrigtwohill)

30 July 2023 Round 1	Glanmire	3-10 - 3-14	Dromtarriffe	Mallow GAA Complex
		Report	E Murphy 1-4 (0-3f), C O’Callaghan 0-6 (0-2f), M O’Connor 1–1, D O’Connor 1-0, M Dennehy 0-1, B O’Keeffe 0-1, D O’Keeffe 0-1.

20 August 2023 Round 2	Glanworth	1-10 - 0-14	Glanmire	Carraig na bhFear Grounds
	D Pyne 1-3.	Report

20 August 2023 Round 2	Dromtarriffe	1-13 - 0-15	St Vincent's	Dr Croke Park
	C O'Callaghan 0-6, D O'Connor 1-0, B O'Keeffe 0-3, E Murphy 0-1, J Murphy 0-1, A Downey 0-1, D O'Keeffe 0-1.		B Murphy 0-6, B Hornibrook 0-2, P O'Sullivan 0-1, M O'Leary 0-1, L Callanan 0-1, B Long 0-1, G Kelleher 0-1.

9 September 2023 Round 3	St Vincent's	4-08 - 2-13	Glanmire	Mayfield Grounds
	B Murphy 3-6 (0-4 f), B Long 1-0, P O’Sullivan, G Kelleher 0-1 each.	Report	C McCarthy 1-3, D Lynch 1-2, D Molden 0-4 (0-3 f), C O’Donovan 0-2, D O’Brien, J Kingston 0-1 each.	Referee: A Hyland (Kilworth)

9 September 2023 Round 3	Glanworth	2-12 - 0-10	Dromtarriffe	Mourneabbey Grounds
	D O'Brien 1-5 (0-2f) D Pyne 1-2, J O'Sullivan 0-3, E Sheehan 0-1, J Fitzgibbon 0-1.	Report	D O'Keeffe 0-4 (0-2f), E Murphy 0-4 (0-1f), C O'Callaghan 0-1, M Healy 0-1.

== Group B ==
=== Group B table ===
Knockout stage Relegation playoff

Team	Matches				Score			Pts
Team	Pld	W	D	L	For	Against	Diff	Pts
Aghabullogue	3	3	0	0	51	30	21	6
Adrigole	3	2	0	1	49	44	5	4
Gabriel Rangers	3	1	0	2	45	45	0	2
Glenville	3	0	0	3	26	52	-26	0

=== Group B results ===
30 July 2023 Round 1	Gabriel Rangers	2-12 - 1-08	Glenville	Kilmurry Grounds
	G O'Callaghan 2-2, M Cronin 0-5, J O'Regan 0-2, S Kelleher 0-1, P O'Driscoll 0-1, K O'Driscoll 0-1.		J Cooke 0-4, C O'Keeffe 1-0, S Desmond 0-2, S Curtin 0-1, C O'Leary 0-1.	Referee: L Knight (Kilmurry)

30 July 2023 Round 1	Aghabullogue	3-13 - 1-07	Adrigole	Ballingeary Grounds
	M Bradley 1-7.	Report

19 August 2023 Round 3	Glenville	0-05 - 2-06	Aghabullogue	Caherlag Grounds
			M Bradley 1-2, P Ring 1-0.

20 August 2023 Round 3	Adrigole	2-11 - 1-09	Gabriel Rangers	Kealkill Grounds
	D Harrington 1-5, N O'Sullivan 1-0, C O'Shea 0-2, K Goggin 0-2, J Harrington 0-1, B O'Sullivan 0-1.		M Cronin 0-8, G o'Callaghan 1-0, S Kelleher 0-1.

9 September 2023 Round 3	Adrigole	1-19 - 1-07	Glenville	Carrigadrohid Grounds
	David Harrington 0-6, T O’Sullivan 1-1, Jason Harrington (f), Charlie O’Sullivan 0-3 each, T Sullivan 0-2, D O’Sullivan (f), S O’Sullivan, B O’Sullivan (f), C O’Shea 0-1 each.	Report	J Cooke 1-4 (0-1f), B Lehane, C O’Leary, S Curtin 0-1 each.	Referee: N Hayes (Carbery Rangers)

9 September 2023 Round 3	Aghabullogue	2-11 - 1-12	Gabriel Rangers	Sam Maguire Park
	M Bradley 0-6, B O'Sullivan 1-1, C O'Sullivan 1-0, E O'Sullivan 0-2, P O'Sullivan 0-1, A O'Sullivan 0-1.		M Cronin 0-8, K O'Brien 1-0, J O'Regan 0-3, K O'Driscoll 0-1,

== Group C ==
=== Group C table ===
Knockout stage Relegation playoff

Team	Matches				Score			Pts
Team	Pld	W	D	L	For	Against	Diff	Pts
Mitchelstown	3	2	1	0	37	35	2	5
Boherbue	3	1	2	0	34	30	4	4
Kildorrery	3	1	1	1	24	25	-1	3
Ballinora	3	0	0	3	31	41	-10	0

=== Group C results ===
26 July 2023 Round 1	Mitchelstown	1-07 - 0-10	Boherbue	Mourneabbey Grounds
	S Beston (1-1), S Cahill (0-3, 1f), K Roche, J Sheehan, D Flynn (all 0-1).	Report	D O’Connor (0-3, frees), G O’Sullivan (0-3), A O’Connor (0-2, frees), CJ O’Sullivan (0-1).	Referee: C McAllister (Aghada)

29 July 2023 Round 1	Ballinora	0-07 - 0-08	Kildorrery	Felix Sarsfield Memorial Park
	N Lordan 0-2, S Kingston 0-2, I Wycherley 0-1, L Lyons 0-1, N Davis 0-1.		S O'Neill 0-7, S Fitzgerald 0-1.	Referee: D Daly (Brian Dillons)

19 August 2023 Round 2	Kildorrery	1-05 - 0-10	Mitchelstown	Glanworth Grounds
	D Kent 1-0, J O'Sullivan 0-1, W Fouhy 0-1, D Kelly 0-1, C Harrington 0-1, S Watson 0-1.		A O'Brien 0-5, S Walsh 0-1, C O'Mahony 0-1, S O'Sullivan 0-1, D O'Flynn 0-1, S Kenneally 0-1.

20 August 2023 Round 2	Boherbue	1-13 - 1-12	Ballinora	Coachford Sportsfield
		Report

9 September 2023 Round 3	Boherbue	1-05 - 1-05	Kildorrery	Fr Con Buckley Park
	J Corkery 1-1, A O'Connor 0-2f, G O'Sullivan 0-1, D O'Connor 0-1.	Report	S Watson 1-0 pen, W Fouhy 0-3 (0-2f), J Keating 0-1, J O'Sullivan 0-1.

9 September 2023 Round 3	Mitchelstown	2-11 - 0-12	Ballinora	Bride Rovers Park
	S Cahill 1-3 (0-2 f), S Beston 1-0, J Sheehan 0-3 (0-1 f), S Walsh 0-2, D Flynn, S O’Sullivan, C Hyland 0-1 each.	Report	N Lordan 0-4 f, M Quirke 0-3, S Kingston 0-2, R Quirke (f), I Wycherley (f), L Lyons (f) 0-1 each.	Referee: C Ó Murchú (Bride Rovers)

== Knockout stage ==
=== Bracket ===
Quarter-Finals
Dromtarriffe	1-10
Boherbue	0-09
Adrigole	0-07
St Vincent's	0-05

Semi-Finals
Aghabullogue	2-12
Dromtarriffe	0-10
Mitchelstown	0-14
Adrigole	0-12

Final
Aghabullogue	2-13
Mitchelstown	1-15

=== Relegation playoff ===
8 October 2023 Playoff	Glenville	1-12 - 1-15	Ballinora	Riverstown Sportsfield
	B Lehane 1-1, C O’Keefe 0-3, S Desmond 0-2 (0-1 f), D O’Leary 0-2 each, J Carver, C Cronin, C Fitzgerald, P O’Leary 0-1 each.	Report	R Quirke 1-2, N Jordan 0-5 f, S Kingston 0-2 (0-1 f), M Quirke 0-2, T Burns, J Keohane, I Wycherley, I Quirke 0-1 each.	Referee: B Coniry (Crosshaven)

=== Quarter-finals ===
23 September 2023 Quarter-final	Dromtarriffe	1-10 - 0-09	Boherbue	Kanturk Grounds
	E Murphy (1-1), C O’Callaghan (0-3, 0-2 frees), B O’Keeffe (0-2). D O’Connor, D O’Keeffe, J Murphy and T Howard (0-1 each).	Report	D O’Connor (0-6, 0-4 frees, 0-1 mark), A Murphy, L Moynihan and B Herlihy (0-1 each).	Referee: P O'Driscoll (Bride Rovers)

23 September 2023 Quarter-final	Adrigole	0-07 - 0-05	St Vincent's	Inchigeelagh Grounds
	D Harrington 0-2, P O’Sullivan, C O’Neill, S O’Shea (f), B O’Sullivan, K Goggin (f) 0-1 each.	Report	B Murphy 0-3 (0-2 f), W Long, G Kelleher 0-1 each.	Referee: L Ryan (Carbery Rangers)

=== Semi-finals ===
6 October 2023 Semi-final	Aghabullogue	2-12 - 0-10	Dromtarriffe	Mallow GAA Complex
	E O’Sullivan 1-5 (0-4 f, 1-0 pen), C O’Sullivan 1-0, M Bradley 0-3 (0-2 f, 0-1 sideline), J Corkery 0-2, A O’Sullivan (45), A Murphy 0-1 each.	Report	C O’Callaghan 0-4 (0-2 f, 0-1 45), D O’Keeffe 0-2, B Murphy, S Howard, B O’Keeffe, D O’Connor 0-1 each.	Referee: C Murphy (Glanworth)

7 October 2023 Semi-final	Mitchelstown	0-14 - 0-12 (aet)	Adrigole	Jack Fitzgerald Memorial Park
	C O’Mahony 0-5 (0-3 f), M Walsh 0-3 (0-2 f), S Walsh 0-3, D Reidy Price 0-2, P Magee 0-1.	Report	K Goggin 0-4 f, D Harrington 0-4 (0-3 f), C O’Shea 0-3, C O’Neill 0-1 m.	Referee: P O'Leary (Kilmurry)

=== Final ===
5 November 2023 Final	Aghabullogue	2-13 - 1-15	Mitchelstown	Páirc Uí Chaoimh
	D Thompson (1-2), A O’Sullivan (0-4, 0-1 free), C O’Sullivan (1-0), M Bradley (0-3, 0-1 free), J Corkery (0-2), L Casey (free) and R Dennehy (0-1 each).	Report	S Beston (0-4), S Cahill (1-0 pen), S Walsh, S O'Sullivan, D Reidy Price and M Walsh (0-1 free) (0-2 each), C Hyland, J O'Sullivan and M Keane (free) (0-1 each).	Referee: B Coniry (Crosshaven)
