= 2024 Cork Intermediate A Football Championship =

Annual Gaelic football competition season

- Dates: 26 July - 26 October 2024
- Teams: 12
- Sponsor: McCarthy Insurance Group
- Champions: Glanmire (2nd title); Conor Neligan (captain); Mark Hopkins (manager)
- Runners-up: Boherbue; Gerry O'Sullivan (captain); Conor O'Riordan (manager)
- Relegated: Na Piarsaigh

Tournament statistics
- Matches played: 24
- Goals scored: 44 (1.83 per match)
- Points scored: 524 (21.83 per match)
- Top scorer(s): David O'Connor (2-42)

The 2024 Cork Intermediate A Football Championship was the 89th staging of the Cork Intermediate A Football Championship since its establishment by the Cork County Board in 1909. The draw for the group stage placings took place on 14 December 2023. The championship ran from 26 July to 26 October 2024.

The final was played on 26 October 2024 at SuperValu Páirc Uí Chaoimh in Cork, between Glanmire and Boherbue, in what was their first ever meeting in the final. Glanmire won the match by 2–10 to 0–15 to claim their second championship title overall and a first title in 27 years.

Boherbue's David O'Connor was the championship's top scorer with 2-42.

== Team changes ==
=== To Championship ===
Relegated from the Cork Premier Intermediate Football Championship

- Na Piarsaigh

Promoted from the Cork Premier Junior Football Championship

- St Finbarr's

=== From Championship ===
Promoted to the Cork Premier Intermediate Football Championship

- Aghabullogue

Relegated to the Cork Premier Junior Football Championship

- Glenville

== Group A ==
=== Group A table ===
Quarter-finalists

Team	Matches				Score			Pts
Team	Pld	W	D	L	For	Against	Diff	Pts
Adrigole	3	2	1	0	42	37	5	5
Gabriel Rangers	3	2	0	1	43	35	8	4
Dromtarriffe	3	1	0	2	45	50	-5	2
Kildorrery	3	0	1	2	37	45	-8	1

=== Group A results ===
27 July 2024 Round 1	Dromtarriffe	0-16 - 3-10	Adrigole	Páirc Abán
	E Murphy 0-8, C O'Callaghan 0-4, D O'Keeffe 0-2, B O'Keeffe 0-2.	Report	B O'Sullivan 3-2, J Harrington 0-4, N O'Sullivan 0-1, C O'Sullivan 0-1, D Collins 0-1, D O'Sullivan 0-1.

27 July 2024 Round 1	Kildorrery	1-09 - 2-10	Gabriel Rangers	Ovens Grounds
	C Harrington 1-2, S Watson 0-3, J O'Sullivan 0-1, L Keating 0-1, J Keating 0-1, S Fitzgerald 0-1.	Report	K O'Brien 2-1, J O'Regan 0-3, S Kelleher 0-2, M Cronin 0-3, G O'Callaghan 0-1.

18 August 2024 Round 2	Adrigole	0-13 - 1-10	Kildorrery	Coachford Sportsfield
	B O'Sullivan 0-5, J Harrington 0-4, C O'Shea 0-3, S O'Shea 0-1.		S Watson 0-6, P Piggott 1-0, L Keating 0-2, T O'Sullivan 0-1, P O'Brien 0-1.

18 August 2024 Round 2	Gabriel Rangers	1-16 - 0-13	Dromtarriffe	Castle Grounds
	M Cronin 0-10, K O'Driscoll 1-0, G O'Callaghan 0-1, K O'Driscoll 0-1.	Report	E Murphy 0-3, B O'Keeffe 0-2, D O'Keeffe 0-1, C O'Callaghan 0-1, J Kelleher 0-1, B Murphy 0-1, D O'Connor 0-1, J Murphy 0-1.

14 September 2024 Round 3	Dromtarriffe	1-13 - 0-12	Kildorrery	Churchtown Grounds
		Report	L Keating 0-4.

14 September 2024 Round 3	Adrigole	0-10 - 1-05	Gabriel Rangers	St Colum's Park
	Cian O’Shea 0-4 (0-3 f); B O’Sullivan, K Goggin 0-2 each; C O’Sullivan, N O’Sullivan (f) 0-1 each.	Report	G O’Callaghan 1-1; K O’Driscoll, P O’Driscoll, S Kelleher (f), K O’Sullivan 0-1 each.

== Group B ==
=== Group B table ===
Semi-finalists Quarter-finalists Relegation playoff

Team	Matches				Score			Pts
Team	Pld	W	D	L	For	Against	Diff	Pts
Mitchelstown	3	2	0	1	48	39	9	4
Glanworth	3	2	0	1	36	34	2	4
Ballinora	3	2	0	1	40	40	0	4
St Vincent's	3	0	0	3	39	50	-11	0

=== Group B results ===
26 July 2024 Round 1	Mitchelstown	1-15 - 1-08	St Vincent's	Páirc Bhríde
	C O'Mahony 0-4, S Walsh 0-4, D Flynn 1-0, J Sheehan 0-3, R Donegan 0-2, D Dineen 0-1, K Cotter 0-1.	Report	K O'Connor 1-2, B Long 0-3, S Duggan 0-1, S Hanrahan 0-1, B Hornibrook 0-1.

27 July 2024 Round 1	Glanworth	1-07 - 0-06	Ballinora	Mayfield Grounds
	D Pyne 1-4, D O'Brien 0-2, M Sheehan 0-1.	Report	S Kingston 0-2, R Quirke 0-2, L Lyons 0-1, N Lordan 0-1.

17 August 2024 Round 2	St Vincent's	0-11 - 1-10	Glanworth	Glenville Grounds
	B Murphy 0-5, K O'Connor 0-3, B Long 0-1, P O'Sullivan 0-1, R Fielding 0-1.	Report	D O'Brien 1-4, D Pyne 0-4, J O'Sullivan 0-1, P Blackburn 0-1.

17 August 2024 Round 2	Ballinora	1-12 - 1-10	Mitchelstown	Páirc Bhríde
	R Quirke 0-5, S Kingston 1-1, M Quirke 0-2, I Quirke 0-2, T Burns 0-1, K Werner 0-1.	Report	D Dineen 1-0, J Sheehan 0-2, C O'Mahony 0-2, K Cotter 0-1, J O'Sullivan 0-1, S Beston 0-1, S Walsh 0-1, D Flynn 0-1, P Magee 0-1.

14 September 2024 Round 3	St Vincent's	3-08 - 2-13	Ballinora	Ovens Grounds
	B Murphy 3-3.	Report	R Quirke 0-5, I Quirke 1-1, J Keohane 1-0.

14 September 2024 Round 3	Mitchelstown	0-17 - 1-10	Glanworth	Araglen Grounds
	C O’Mahony 0-6, J Sheehan 0-4, M Keane 0-2.	Report	M Sheehan 1-1, D Pyne 0-4.

== Group C ==
=== Group C table ===
Semi-finalists Quarter-finalists Relegation playoff

Team	Matches				Score			Pts
Team	Pld	W	D	L	For	Against	Diff	Pts
Glanmire	3	2	1	0	53	36	17	5
Boherbue	3	2	0	1	46	27	19	4
St Finbarr's	3	1	1	1	54	33	21	3
Na Piarsaigh	3	0	0	3	24	81	-57	0

=== Group C results ===
26 July 2024 Round 1	Na Piarsaigh	0-06 - 1-22	Boherbue	O'Connell Park
	C Horgan 0-4.	Report	D O’Connor 1-11, G O’Sullivan 0-6, L Moynihan 0-2, K Cremin 0-1, B Herlihy 0-1, D Moynihan 0-1.

28 July 2024 Round 1	St Finbarr's	1-12 - 3-06	Glanmire	St Vincent's Grounds
	M Shields 0-7 (0-5 f, 0-1 mark).	Report

17 August 2024 Round 2	Glanmire	3-19 - 2-06	Na Piarsaigh	Mayfield Grounds
	D Molden 1-6.	Report

18 August 2024 Round 2	Boherbue	0-12 - 1-08	St Finbarr's	O'Connell Park
	D O'Connor 0-7, A O'Connor 0-2, G O'Sullivan 0-1, D Moynihan 0-1, J Corkery 0-1.		A Murphy 0-4, D O'Brien 1-0, C Madden 0-2, S Fenton 0-1, A Lyne 0-1.

14 September 2024 Round 3	Boherbue	0-09 - 0-10	Glanmire	Mourneabbey Grounds
	J Corkery 0-4 (0-1 f), D O’Connor 0-3 (0-2 f), L Moynihan, G O’Sullivan 0-1 each.	Report	D Lynch 0-3 (0-2 f), C O’Donovan, C Crowley, T O’Donoghue (f), D Kenneally, J Crowley (f), D McCarthy, B O’Connell (45) 0-1 each.

14 September 2024 Round 3	Na Piarsaigh	0-06 - 4-16	St Finbarr's	Mayfield Grounds
	E Sheehan, SP Cooke, C Hogan, E Fitzgerald, S Downey, J Gardiner 0-1 each.	Report	M Shields 1-5 (0-3 f); A Murphy 1-3 (0-1 f, 0-1 45); D O’Brien 1-3; S Fenton 1-0; O Murphy 0-2; C Maher, P Kerins, J Murphy each.

== Knockout stage ==
=== Bracket ===
Quarter-Finals
Boherbue (Duhallow)	2-14
Glanworth (Avondhu)	0-14
Mitchelstown (Avondhu)	0-10
Gabriel Rangers (Carbery)	0-13

Semi-Finals
Adrigole (Beara)	0-11
Boherbue (Duhallow)	1-09
Glanmire (Imokilly)	1-09
Gabriel Rangers (Carbery)	0-11

Final
Boherbue (Duhallow)	0-15
Glanmire (Imokilly)	2-10

=== Relegation playoff ===
28 September 2024 Playoff	St Vincent's	2-05 - 1-07	Na Piarsaigh	Mayfield Grounds
	B Murphy (2-4, 0-1 free); B Long (0-1).	Report	S Forde (1-1); K Moynihan, C Hogan, C Clancy, S Downey, M Sheehan, K Forde (0-1 each).

=== Quarter-finals ===
28 September 2024 Quarter-final	Boherbue	2-14 - 0-14	Glanworth	Mallow GAA Complex
	D O’Connor (1-8, 0-3 frees); D Sheehan (1-0); J Corkery (0-3, 0-1 mark); G O’Sullivan (0-2); L Moynihan (0-1).	Report	D Pyne (0-4, 0-3 frees), D O’Brien (0-4, 0-1 free); S Condon, M Sheehan (0-2 each); G O’Neill, S Finn (0-1 each).

6 October 2024 Quarter-final	Mitchelstown	0-10 - 0-13	Gabriel Rangers	Jack Fitzgerald Memorial Park
	C O’Mahony 0-4 (0-3f), P Magee 0-2 (0-1f), S Beston, M Keane, J Sheehan, D Price 0-1 each.	Report	M Cronin (0-6, 5f), J O’Regan (0-4, 1f, 1m), L Bowen, P O’Driscoll, K O’Driscoll (0-1 each).

=== Semi-finals ===
12 October 2024 Semi-final	Adrigole	0-11 - 1-09	Boherbue	Páirc Uí Chuana
	C O’Shea (0-4, 0-3 frees), N O’Sullivan (0-1 free) and B O’Sullivan (0-2 each), S O’Sullivan, D O’Sullivan and G O’Shea (0-1 each).	Report	D O’Connor (0-6, 0-3 frees), J Corkery (1-1), L Moynihan and A O’Connor (free) (0-1 each).

12 October 2024 Semi-final	Glanmire	1-09 - 0-11	Gabriel Rangers	Clonakilty Grounds
	D Molden (0-5, 0-2 f), C Crowley (1-1), D Lynch, T O’Donoghue (f), D McCarthy (f) (0-1 each).	Report	M Cronin (0-4, 0-3 f, 0-1 m), J O’Regan (0-3, 0-2 f), S Kelleher (f), K Roycroft, G O’Callaghan, E Goggin (0-1 each).

=== Final ===
26 October 2024 Final	Boherbue	0-15 - 2-10	Glanmire	SuperValu Páirc Uí Chaoimh
	D O’Connor 0-7 (0-2f), D Moynihan (0-1m), D Sheehan 0-2 each, J Corkery (0-1m), G O’Sullivan (0-1m), Alan O’Connor, Andrew O’Connor (0-1f) 0-1 each.	Report	D Molden 0-4f, S O’Driscoll, C Crowley 1-0 each, D Lynch (0-1f), C McCarthy 0-2 each, H Jones, D Hogan 0-1 each.	Referee: P O’Leary (Kilmurry)

== Championship statistics ==
=== Top scorers ===
Overall

Rank	Player	Club	Tally	Total	Matches	Average
1	David O'Connor	Boherbue	2-42	48	6	8.00
2	Blake Murphy	St Vincent's	5-12	27	4	6.75
3	Mark Cronin	Gabriel Rangers	0-23	23	5	4.60
