= 2025 Cork Intermediate A Football Championship =

Annual Gaelic football competition season

- Dates: 26 July - 2 November 2025
- Teams: 12
- Sponsor: McCarthy Insurance Group
- Champions: Ballinora (1st title); Shane Kingston (captain); James Lordan (captain); Willie Lyons (manager)
- Runners-up: Ilen Rovers; Damien O'Sullivan (captain); Flor O'Driscoll (manager)
- Relegated: St Vincent's

Tournament statistics
- Matches played: 25
- Goals scored: 55 (2.2 per match)
- Points scored: 671 (26.84 per match)
- Top scorer(s): Dan Mac Eoin (2-29)

The 2025 Cork Intermediate A Football Championship was the 90th staging of the Cork Intermediate A Football Championship since its establishment by the Cork County Board in 1909. The draw for the group stage placings took place on 10 December 2024. The competition ran from 26 July to 16 November 2025.

The final, a replay, was played on 16 November 2025 at SuperValu Páirc Uí Chaoimh in Cork, between Ballinora and Ilen Rovers, in what was their first ever meeting in the final. Ballinora won the match by 1–19 to 2–14 to claim their first ever championship title.

Dan Mac Eoin was the championship's top scorer with 2-29.

== Team changes ==
=== To Championship ===
Relegated from the Cork Premier Intermediate Football Championship

- Ilen Rovers

Promoted from the Cork Premier Junior Football Championship

- Kilmurry

=== From Championship ===
Promoted to the Cork Premier Intermediate Football Championship

- Glanmire

Relegated to the Cork Premier Junior Football Championship

- Na Piarsaigh

== Group 1 ==
=== Group 1 table ===
Semi-finalist Quarter-finalist

Team	Matches				Score			Pts
Team	Pld	W	D	L	For	Against	Diff	Pts
Adrigole	3	3	0	0	60	30	30	6
Ballinora	3	1	1	1	52	51	1	3
St Finbarr's	3	1	0	2	41	54	-13	2
Glanworth	3	0	1	1	34	52	-18	1

=== Group 1 results ===
26 July 2025 Round 1	Adrigole	2-15 - 0-06	Glanworth	Coachford Sportsfield
	B O'Sullivan 2-3, T O'Connor 0-5, C O'Shea 0-3, D Collins 0-2, T Sullivan 0-1, C O'Sullivan 0-1	Report	J Walsh 0-2, D Pyne 0-2, S Finn 0-1, M Sheehan 0-1.

27 July 2025 Round 1	Ballinora	2-17 - 2-09	St Finbarr's	Ballinhassig Grounds
	M O'Brien 1-4, K Werner 1-3, M Quirke 0-5, R Quirke 0-4.	Report	C O'Sullivan 1-2, J Lenihan 0-3.

23 August 2025 Round 2	St Finbarr's	1-08 - 2-13	Adrigole	Rossa Park
	J Linehan 0-4, D O'Brien 1-0, M Ahern 0-1, T O'Keeffe 0-1, S Kirby 0-1, C O'Sullivan 0-1.	Report	T O’Connor 0-8, B O'Sullivan 1-1, C O’Shea 0-2, G O'Shea 0-1, D Harrington 0-1.

24 August 2025 Round 2	Glanworth	1-13 - 1-13	Ballinora	Páirc Uí Rinn
	D O’Brien 1-6, S O’Riordan 0-6.	Report	R Quirke 1-4, K Werner 0-3, M Quirke 0-3.

13 September 2025 Round 3	Adrigole	2-14 - 1-10	Ballinora	Páirc Gleann Bhearracháin
	C O'Sullivan 0-3.	Report	R Quirke 1-3, K Werner 0-2, M O'Brien 0-2.

13 September 2025 Round 3	Glanworth	2-06 - 0-15	St Finbarr's	Glenville Grounds
	D Pyne 2-5 (0-2 f), J Fogarty 0-1.	Report	C O’Sullivan 0-5 (1 2pt), J Lenihan 0-4 (1 2pt f, 1 45), M Shields, A Lyne 0-2 each, S Kirby, C Lyons 0-1 each.

== Group 2 ==
=== Group 2 table ===
Quarter-finalist Relegation playoff

Team	Matches				Score			Pts
Team	Pld	W	D	L	For	Against	Diff	Pts
Gabriel Rangers	3	2	1	0	57	47	10	5
Mitchelstown	3	2	0	1	60	45	15	4
Kildorrery	3	1	1	1	41	52	-11	3
Dromtarriffe	3	0	0	3	42	56	-14	0

=== Group 2 results ===
26 July 2025 Round 1	Gabriel Rangers	0-19 - 0-16	Mitchelstown	Páirc Uinsinn
	C Moynihan 0-4, K O’Driscoll 0-3, J O’Regan 0-3, E Goggin 0-2, G O’Callaghan 0-2, S Kelleher 0-2.	Report	M Walsh 0-6, J Cott 0-3, S Beston 0-3, C Keane-Hyland 0-2.

27 July 2025 Round 1	Dromtarriffe	0-12 - 0-14	Kildorrery	Dr Croke Park
	C O'Callaghan 0-7, E Murphy 0-4.	Report	J Keating 0-7, C Harrington 0-2, D Caplice 0-2.

23 August 2025 Round 2	Kildorrery	1-15 - 1-15	Gabriel Rangers	Belgooly Grounds
	A Crowley 0-5, J Keating 0-4, P Piggott 1-0, L Keating 0-2, C Harrington 0-2, S Fitzgerald 0-1, C Coughlan 0-1.	Report	P O’Driscoll 1-2, J O’Regan 0-3, K O’Driscoll 0-3, E Goggin 0-2, C Moynihan 0-2, G O'Callaghan 0-1, J O'Brien 0-1, S Kelleher 0-1.

24 August 2025 Round 2	Mitchelstown	2-16 - 0-17	Dromtarriffe	O'Connell Park
	J Cott 2-2, J Sheehan 0-8, M Walsh 0-2, S Beston 0-1, D Flynn 0-1, C Walsh 0-1, C O'Mahony 0-1.	Report	E Murphy 0-4, A Healy 0-3, T Howard 0-3, C O'Callaghan 0-3, F McKee 0-2, A Downey 0-1, J Kelleher 0-1.

13 September 2025 Round 3	Gabriel Rangers	0-20 - 1-10	Dromtarriffe	Castletownkinneigh Grounds
	S Kelleher 0-6, M Cronin 0-5, E Goggin 0-3, K O'Driscoll 0-2, P O'Driscoll 0-2, G O'Callaghan 0-1, K O'Brien 0-1.	Report	E Murphy 0-4, J Kelleher 1-0, A Healy 0-3, C O'Callaghan 0-2, T Howard 0-1.

13 September 2025 Round 3	Mitchelstown	3-13 - 0-09	Kildorrery	Páirc Uí Shíocháin
	C O’Mahony (1-6, 1-0 penalty, 0-4 frees); M Walsh (1-3, 1tpf, 1 free); J Sheehan (1-1, 0-1 free); L Keane, C Keane-Hyland, S O’Sullivan (0-1 each).	Report	C Harrington (0-4, 4 frees); S Fitzgerald, L Keating (tp) (0-2 each); A Crowley (0-1 free).

== Group 3 ==
=== Group 3 table ===
Semi-finalist Quarter-finalist Relegation playoff

Team	Matches				Score			Pts
Team	Pld	W	D	L	For	Against	Diff	Pts
Kilmurry	3	2	1	0	63	38	25	5
Ilen Rovers	3	2	1	0	49	37	12	5
Boherbue	3	1	0	2	38	47	-9	2
St Vincent's	3	0	0	3	35	63	-28	0

=== Group 3 results ===
26 July 2025 Round 1	Boherbue	0-12 - 1-12	Ilen Rovers	Inchigeelagh Grounds
	J Corkery 0-6, B Herlihy 0-3, C Ducey 0-2.	Report	A O’Driscoll 1-5, M Sheehy 0-2.

27 July 2025 Round 1	Kilmurry	4-17 - 0-12	St Vincent's	Páirc Dhónaill Uí Cheallacháin
	D O'Mullane 3-3, R Ó Cuarraoin 1-7, Joe Mullane 0-3, C Kelleher 0-2, Johnny Mullane 0-2.	Report	Blake Murphy 0-4, A Harte 0-2, B Long 0-2.

23 August 2025 Round 2	Ilen Rovers	1-14 - 1-14	Kilmurry	Rossmore Grounds
	D Mac Eoin 0-6, D Coakley 1-0, A O’Driscoll 0-3, D Hegarty 0-1, A O'Sullivan 0-1, M Sheehy 0-1, S Connolly 0-1, B Collins 0-1.	Report	L Wall 0-5, K Kelleher 0-4, S O'Leary 1-1, R O Curraoin 0-2, D O'Mullane 0-1, A Aisling 0-1.

24 August 2025 Round 2	St Vincent's	1-12 - 1-14	Boherbue	Jack Fitzgerald Memorial Park
	B Murphy 1-6, B Long 0-2, B Hornibrook 0-1, W Long 0-1, L Callanan 0-1, C Leonard 0-1.	Report	D O’Connor 0-5, A O’Connor 1-0, CJ O’Sullivan 0-2, J Corkery 0-2, G O'Sullivan 0-1, L Moynihan 0-1, B Herlihy 0-1, N Murphy 0-1, J Daly 0-1.

13 September 2025 Round 3	Ilen Rovers	1-14 - 1-05	St Vincent's	Páirc Uinsinn
	A O’Driscoll 0-5, D Mac Eoin 0-4, B Collins 1-0, A Holland 0-1, S Connolly 0-1, D Hegarty 0-1, S Minihane 0-1, M Sheehy 0-1.	Report	B Long 1-0, A Harte 0-3, K O'Connor 0-2.

13 September 2025 Round 3	Boherbue	0-09 - 2-11	Kilmurry	Clondrohid Grounds
	D O’Connor 0-4 (0-2 f), D Sheehan (1 2pt), J Corkery 0-2 each, G O’Sullivan 0-1.	Report	R Duggan 1-2, W Ronan 1-0, R Ó Curraoin 0-3 (0-2 f), S O’Leary 0-2, James O’Mullane, Joe O’Mullane, D O’Mullane, L Wall 0-1 each.

== Relegation stage ==
=== Relegation playoff ===
27 September 2025 Playoff	Dromtarriffe	3-13 - 2-15	St Vincent's	Castle Grounds
	D O’Keeffe 1-4 (2 2pt), M O’Connor 2-0, E Murphy 0-4 (0-2 f, 0-1 45), C O’Callaghan 0-3 (1 2pt), A Healy, M O’Callaghan 0-1 each.	Report	B Murphy 0-9 (2 2pt f), A Harte 1-2, S Duggan 1-1, D Quinn, B Long, J Price 0-1 each.

== Knockout stage ==
=== Quarter-finals ===
27 September 2025 Quarter-final	Gabriel Rangers	1-11 - 1-13	Balinora	Rossmore Grounds
	J O’Regan 0-5 (0-4 f), G O’Callaghan 1-1, S Kelleher 0-2, E Goggin, M Cronin (f), K O’Brien 0-1 each.	Report	K Werner 1-1, I Quirke, R Quirke (0-1 f), M Quirke, M O’Brien 0-2 each, D Holmes, L Lyons, J Lordan, I Wycherley 0-1 each.

27 September 2025 Quarter-final	Ilen Rovers	2-12 - 1-10	Mitchelstown	Páirc Naomh Eoin
	B Collins, S Carey 1-0 each, A O’Driscoll (1 2p f), M Sheehy 0-3 (1 2pt), S Connolly 0-3 each, D Mac Eoin 0-2, A Holland 0-1.	Report	M Keane 1-1 (0-1 f), C O’Mahony 0-3 f, J Sheehan 0-2; K Roche, S Walsh, P Magee, C Walsh 0-1 each.

=== Semi-finals ===
11 October 2025 Semi-final	Adrigole	0-22 - 0-24 (aet)	Ilen Rovers	Wolfe Tone Park
	C O’Sullivan 0-5 (0-1 f), B O’Sullivan (1 2pt), C O'Shea (1 2pt) 0-4 each, T O’Connor 0-3 f, D Collins (1 2pt f), D O’Sullivan 0-2 each, L Harrington, D Harrington 0-1 each.	Report	D MacEoin 0-12 (0-3 f, 2 2pt f, 1 2pt), M Sheehy 0-6 (2 2pts), D Hegarty 0-2, S Connolly, A O’Driscoll, B Collins, K O’Driscoll 0-1 each.

12 October 2025 Semi-final	Kilmurry	1-16 - 2-17	Balinora	Éire Óg Grounds
	D O’Mullane 0-7 (3 tp), R Ó Currain 1-5 (0-3 f), L Wall 0-1, John O’Mullane 0-1, L Asling 0-1, M O’Leary 0-1.	Report	M Quirke 1-2, M O’Brien 1-2, K Werner 0-3 (2 f), N Lordan 0-3 (1 tpf), I Quirke 0-2, R Quirke 0-1 (f), S Kingston 0-1, L Lyons 0-1, D Holmes 0-1, J Byrne 0-1.

=== Final ===
2 November 2025 Final	Ilen Rovers	2-09 - 0-15	Balinora	SuperValu Páirc Uí Chaoimh
	D Mac Eoin 1-2 (0-2 f), A O’Driscoll 1-1, M Sheehy 0-2, J Hickey, S Connolly, A Holland, K O’Driscoll 0-1 each.	Report	S Kingston, N Lordan (2 2ptf) 0-4 each, M O’Brien 0-3, M Quirke, I Wycherley, L Lyons, I Quirke 0-1 each.	Referee: J Kelleher (St John's)

=== Final replay ===
16 November 2025 Final replay	Ilen Rovers	2-14 - 1-19	Balinora	SuperValu Páirc Uí Chaoimh
	M Sheehy 0-6 (2 2pt f, 1 2pt), D MacEoin 1-3 (0-1 f), A O’Sullivan 1-0, B Collins 0-2, S Connolly, D O’Driscoll, A Holland 0-1 each.	Report	K Werner 1-4 (0-2 f), S Kingston 0-4 (1 2pt, 0-1 45), M Quirke 0-3, N Lordan (1 2pt f), I Quirke 0-2 each, M O’Brien, D Dineen, L Lyons, D Holmes 0-1 each.

== Championship statistics ==
=== Top scorers ===
Rank	Player	Club	Tally	Total	Matches	Average
1	Dan Mac Eoin	Ilen Rovers	2-29	35	6	5.83
2	Kevin Werner	Ballinora	3-16	25	7	3.57
3	Adrian O'Driscoll	Ilen Rovers	2-18	24	7	3.42
4	Ruadhán Ó Cuarraoin	Kilmurry	2-17	23	4	5.75
5	Blake Murphy	St Vincent's	1-19	22	4	5.50
