= 2018 Cork Intermediate Football Championship =

83rd staging of the Cork Intermediate Football Championship

- Dates: 7 April - 3 November 2018
- Teams: 21
- Sponsor: Evening Echo
- Champions: Cill na Martra (1st title); Graham Ó Mocháin (captain); Kevin O'Sullivan (manager)
- Runners-up: Aghabullogue; Evan O'Sullivan (captain)
- Promoted: Cill na Martra
- Relegated: Carrigaline; Clonakilty

Tournament statistics
- Matches played: 33
- Goals scored: 74 (2.24 per match)
- Points scored: 744 (22.55 per match)
- Top scorer(s): Paul Condon (1-26)

The 2018 Cork Intermediate Football Championship was the 83rd staging of the Cork Intermediate Football Championship since its establishment by the Cork County Board in 1909. The draw for the opening round fixtures took place on 10 December 2017. The championship ran from 7 April to 3 November 2018.

The final was played on 28 October 2018 at Páirc Uí Chaoimh in Cork, between Cill Na Martra and Aghabullogue, in what was their first ever meeting in the final. Cill na Martra won the match by 2–17 to 1–10 to claim their first ever championship title.

Mayfield's Paul Condon was the championship's top scorer with 1-26.

== Results ==
=== Preliminary round ===
7 April 2018 Preliminary round	Mayfield	0-08 - 0-13	Glenville	Ballinlough Grounds
	D Grainger 0-3, S O'Donovan 0-1, D Lucey 0-1, D O'Neill 0-1, M Barry 0-1, S Kelly 0-1.		D O'Donovan 0-8, J McCarthy 0-2, W Connolly 0-1, PJ Dennehy 0-1, S Dennehy 0-1.

=== Round 1 ===
14 April 2018 Round 1	Gabriel Rangers	1-03 - 3-18	St Finbarr's	St Mary's Park
	M Cronin 1-1, S Kelleher 0-1, E Goggin 0-1.		R O'Mahony 1-8, E McGreevey 0-7, C Walsh 1-0, B O'Connell 1-0, A Murphy 0-2, K Hodgins 0-1.

14 April 2018 Round 1	Glanmire	0-08 - 0-09	Kildorrery	Páirc Mac Gearailt
	A Barry 0-6, J Murphy 0-2.		S O'Neill 0-2, R McEniry 0-2, E O'Connor 0-1, D Kent 0-1, J O'Gorman 0-1, S O'Sullivan 0-1, J McEniry 0-1.

14 April 2018 Round 1	Glanworth	1-06 - 1-09	Grenagh	Mill Field
	D Pyne 1-0, S O'Riordan 0-2, R Murphy 0-1, E Sheehan 0-1, J O'Sullivan 0-1, B Gallagher 0-1.		DD Dorgan 0-6, P Barry-Murphy 1-0, K Cummins 0-1, G Russell 0-1, S Dorgan 0-1.

15 April 2018 Round 1	Ballinora	0-06 - 2-22	Cill na Martra	Castle Grounds
	D Holmes 0-2, D Buckley 0-1, B Ahern 0-1, M Murphy 0-1, P Fitton 0-1.		S Ó Duinnín 1-8, D Ó Duinnín 0-6, F Ó hÉalaithe 1-1, N Ó Laoire 0-2, C Ó Duinnín 0-1, M Ó Conchúir 0-1, T Ó Corcora 0-1, A Ó Cuana 0-1, S Ó Fóirréidh 0-1.

15 April 2018 Round 1	Kinsale	1-09 - 2-11	Mitchelstown	Felix Sarsfield Memorial Park
	G Finn 0-4, C MacCartan 1-0, B Coughlan 0-3, S O'Neill 0-1, D Ward 0-1.		J Sheehan 0-5, C O'Mahony 1-1, S Walsh 1-0, P Magee 0-3, M Walsh 0-1, S Cahill 0-1.

15 April 2018 Round 1	Knocknagree	0-17 - 3-07	Rockchapel	Newmarket Grounds
	A O'Connor 0-10, E McSweeney 0-3, F O'Connor 0-1, M Dilworth 0-1, JF Daly 0-1, D Moynihan 0-1.		L Collins 2-4, S Hickey 1-2, N Linehan 0-1.

15 April 2018 Round 1	Carrigaline	0-16 - 0-18 (aet)	Youghal	Páirc Séamus de Barra
	M Brosnan 0-9, S O'Brien 0-3, T Deasy 0-1, K Dwane 0-1, N Coleman 0-1, J O'Regan 0-1.		J O'Mahony 0-4, N Roche 0-4, K McCarthy 0-3, P Moylan 0-3, A Joyce 0-1, D O'Mahony 0-1, R Cunningham 0-1, J Cooper 0-1.

21 April 2018 Round 1	Aghabullogue	1-15 - 1-07	Ballydesmond	Newmarket Grounds
	M Bradley 0-7, J Corkery 0-5, S O'Sullivan 1-1, E O'Sullivan 0-2.		D O'Connor 0-4, S Kelly 1-0, P Breen 0-1, J Healy 0-1, A Browne 0-1.

21 April 2018 Round 1	Clonakilty	1-06 - 1-17	Millstreet	Blarney Grounds
	L Halligan 1-4, L Cahill 0-1, G Calnan 0-1.		C Crowley 0-6, M Vaughan 0-5, S Hickey 1-0, K Crowley 0-3, N Flahive 0-2, D Hickey 0-1.

21 April 2018 Round 1	Glenville	1-07 - 2-10	Adrigole	Inchigeelagh Grounds
	D Dennehy 1-1, D O'Donovan 0-4, B Halbert 0-1, E Delahunt 0-1.		D Harrington 1-2, K Goggin 1-1, J Harrington 0-3, N O'Sullivan 0-2, R O'Sullivan 0-1, A O'Sullivan 0-1.

=== Round 2 ===
6 July 2018 Round 2	Carrigaline	1-08 - 6-21	Mayfield	Páirc Liam Mhic Cárthaigh
	S O'Brien 1-1, M Brosnan 0-4, E Ryle 0-1, D Drake 0-1, D Brannigan 0-1.		P Condon 0-10, S O'Donovan 2-1, M Barry 1-4, D Grainger 1-3, S Fitzgerald 1-0, D Malone 1-0, D Lucey 0-2, B O'Leary 0-1.

7 July 2018 Round 2	Ballinora	0-08 - 0-13	Kinsale	Brinnt Sportsfield
	M Murphy 0-6, B Ahern 0-1, C Lougheed 0-1.		G Finn 0-6, C Donnellan 0-4, R O'Sullivan 0-1, B Coughlan 0-1, C Mitchell 0-1.

7 July 2018 Round 2	Gabriel Rangers	5-15 - 1-10	Glanmire	Sam Maguire Park
	G O'Callaghan 3-1, E Goggin 2-1, M Cronin 0-7, S Kelleher 0-5, R O'Neill 0-1.		K Kenneally 1-2, A Barry 0-3, C Kelleher 0-1, C Shine 0-1, C Crowley 0-1, D Molden 0-1, A Garvey 0-1.

21 July 2018 Round 2	Glanworth	2-06 - 0-04	Glenville	Mill Field
	S O'Riordan 1-2, J Walsh 1-0, B Gallagher 0-1, R Murphy 0-1, E Sheehan 0-1, P O'Driscoll 0-1.		D O'Donovan 0-3, J Gowan 0-1.

28 July 2018 Round 2	Ballydesmond	2-19 - 0-07	Clonakilty	Castle Grounds
	N Fleming 1-5, D Moynihan 0-5, R Flynn 0-4, J O'Keeffe 1-0, D O'Connor 0-2, S Cronin 0-1, B Fleming 0-1, J O'Leary 0-1.		D O'Regan 0-5, L Cahill 0-1, L Halligan 0-1.

=== Relegation playoffs ===
6 October 2018 Playoff	Ballinora	w/o - scr.	Clonakilty	Kinsale Grounds

18 October 2018 Playoff	Carrigaline	0-07 - 0-17	Glanmire	Ballincollig Grounds
	N Fitzgerald 0-2, D Drake 0-2, P O'Riordan 0-2, D Stack 0-1.		J Murphy 0-10, K Kenneally 0-2, C Crowley 0-1, S Crowe 0-1, D McCarthy 0-1, T Leahy 0-1, C Kelleher 0-1.

3 November 2018 Playoff	Rockchapel	w/o - scr.	Carrigaline	Páirc Eoin Mhic Charthaigh

=== Round 3 ===
11 August 2018 Round 3	Aghabullogue	3-09 - 0-09	Grenagh	Cloughduv Grounds
	J Corkery 1-3, M Bradley 1-2, D Thompson 1-0, E O'Sullivan 0-2, P Finnegan 0-2.		DD Dorgan 0-5, K Cummins 0-1, P Barry-Murphy 0-1, T Breathnach 0-1, U Duggan 0-1.

11 August 2018 Round 3	Adrigole	0-08 - 2-17	Knocknagree	Páirc Abán
	K Goggin 0-6, L Harrington 0-1, F Carey 0-1.		A O'Connor 1-6, E McSweeney 1-2, T Cooper 0-2, D O'Connor 0-2, D Cooper 0-1, M Dilworth 0-1, F O'Connor 0-1, JF Daly 0-1, D Moynihan 0-1.

11 August 2018 Round 3	Cill na Martra	1-08 - 1-08	Glanworth	Páirc Eoin Mhic Charthaigh
	D Ó Duinnín 1-2, S Ó Duinnín 0-3, A Ó Conaill 0-1, T Ó Corcora 0-1, G Ó hÚrdail 0-1.		D Pyne 1-0, S O'Riordan 0-3, E O'Donoghue 0-2, P Blackburn 0-1, P O'Driscoll 0-1, R O'Driscoll 0-1.

11 August 2018 Round 3	Gabriel Rangers	1-12 - 1-15	Youghal	Charlie Hurley Park
	M Cronin 1-4, E Goggin 0-4, G O'Callaghan 0-3, S Kelleher 0-1.		J O'Mahony 1-1, K McCarthy 0-4, P Moylan 0-4, R Cunningham 0-3, L Desmond 0-2, N Roche 0-1.

12 August 2018 Round 3	Kinsale	0-08 - 2-09	Millstreet	Carrigadrohid Grounds
	G Finn 0-3, S O'Neill 0-1, R O'Sullivan 0-1, D Coughlan 0-1, D Ward 0-1, C Donnellan 0-1.		M Vaughan 1-5, N Flahive 1-2, K Crowley 0-1, D Kiely 0-1.

12 August 2018 Round 3	Mitchelstown	1-18 - 1-08	Rockchapel	Churchtown Grounds
	S Beston 1-2, C O'Mahony 0-5, M Walsh 0-4, S Walsh 0-2, J Sheehan 0-2, S O'Sullivan 0-1, M Keane 0-1, S Cahill 0-1.		L Collins 0-5, M McAuliffe 1-1, K Collins 0-1, B Cahill 0-1.

18 August 2018 Round 3	Ballydesmond	1-11 - 1-13	St Finbarr's	Castle Grounds
	D O'Connor 0-6, R Flynn 1-0, N Fleming 0-2, S Cronin 0-2, D Moynihan 0-1.		E McGreevey 0-7, I O'Callaghan 1-0, K Hodgins 0-3, A Murphy 0-1, B O'Connell 0-1, R O'Mahony 0-1.

24 August 2018 Round 3	Kildorrery	0-13 - 1-10	Mayfield	Mallow GAA Complex
	B Stapleton 0-4, S Fitzgerald 0-3, T Monaghan 0-2, S Coughlan 0-1, J McEniry 0-1, R McEniry 0-1, P Keating 0-1.		S Hackett 1-0, D Grainger 0-3, P Condon 0-3, D O'Neill 0-1, S Kelly 0-1, N Kelly 0-1, D Lucey 0-1.

15 September 2018 Round 3 replay	Kildorrery	1-11 - 1-14	Mayfield	Mill Field
	S O'Neill 1-2, J McEniry 0-2, F Stapleton 0-2, J O'Gorman 0-1, D Kent 0-1, J O'Sullivan 0-1, T Monaghan 0-1, E McEniry 0-1.		P Condon 1-11, N Kelly 0-1, S Fitzgerald 0-1, D Lucey 0-1.

=== Quarter-finals ===
24 August 2018 Quarter-final	Knocknagree	1-08 - 3-09	St Finbarr's	Castle Grounds
	J Dennehy 1-1, E McSweeney 0-3, D O'Connor 0-1, JF Daly 0-1, F O'Connor 0-1, M Dilworth 0-1.		E McGreevey 2-2, R O'Mahony 1-3, C Keane 0-1, C Davey 0-1, C Buckley 0-1, A Lyne 0-1.

7 September 2018 Quarter-final	Cill na Martra	3-20 - 2-13	Millstreet	Castle Grounds
	D Ó Duinnín 3-6, D Ó Conaill 0-4, M Ó Deasúna 0-3, S Ó Duinnín 0-3, T Ó Corcora 0-2, M Ó Conchúir 0-1, C Ó Duinnín 0-1.		M Vaughan 1-7, P Moynihan 1-0, J Linehan 0-3, D Kiely 0-1, S Hickey 0-1, N Flahive 0-1.

23 September 2018 Quarter-final	Mitchelstown	1-17 - 2-12	Youghal	St Catherine's Park
	C O'Mahony 1-6, D Walsh 0-3, J Sheehan 0-2, D Reidy-Price 0-2, S Cahill 0-2, M Walsh 0-1, S Beston 0-1.		P Moylan 1-4, A Joyce 1-2, K McCarthy 0-3, B Ring 0-1, D O'Mahony 0-1, J Ormonde 0-1.

6 October 2018 Quarter-final	Aghabullogue	2-13 - 0-08	Mayfield	Castle Grounds
	J Corkery 0-7, I Barry-Murphy 1-3, D Thompson 1-2, E O'Sullivan 0-1.		P Condon 0-2, D Lucey 0-1, N Kelly 0-1, S O'Donovan 0-1, D O'Neill 0-1, S Kelly 0-1, S Fitzgerald 0-1.

=== Semi-finals ===
7 October 2018 Semi-final	Mitchelstown	0-09 - 0-10	Cill na Martra	Mourneabbey Grounds
	C O'Mahony 0-4, J Sheehan 0-2, L O'Flynn 0-1, L Keane 0-1, M Walsh 0-1.		S Ó Duinnín 0-4, M Ó Deasúna 0-3, A Ó Cuana 0-1, G Ó Mocháin 0-1, D Ó Conaill 0-1.

13 October 2018 Semi-final	Aghabullogue	1-10 - 0-11	St Finbarr's	Éire Óg Grounds
	J Corkery 1-2, E O'Sullivan 0-2, D Thompson 0-2, M Bradley 0-2, I Barry-Murphy 0-1, N Barry-Murphy 0-1.		I O'Callaghan 0-2, C Walsh 0-2, E Keane 0-2, K Hodgins 0-1, B O'Connell 0-1, A Murphy 0-1, R Leahy 0-1, C McCarthy 0-1.

=== Final ===
28 October 2018 Final	Cill na Martra	2-17 - 1-10	Aghabullogue	Páirc Uí Chaoimh
	M Ó Deasúna (0-8, 0-7 frees, 0-1 45m), S Ó Duinnín (2-1), D Ó Conaill (0-3), C Ó Duinnín (0-2 frees), G Ó Mocháin, T Ó Corcora and D Ó Duinnín (0-1 each).	Report	D Thompson (0-6, 0-5 frees), E O’Sullivan (1-0), N Barry Murphy, J Corkery, I Barry Murphy and M Bradley (0-1 each).	Referee: É Sheehy (Newcestown)

== Championship statistics ==
=== Top scorers ===
Overall

Rank	Player	Club	Tally	Total	Matches	Average
1	Paul Condon	Mayfield	1-26	29	4	7.25
2	Shane Ó Duinnín	Cill na Martra	3-19	28	5	5.60
3	Daniel Ó Duinnín	Cill na Martra	4-15	27	5	5.40
4	John Corkery	Aghabullogue	2-18	24	5	4.80
5	Michael Vaughan	Millstreet	2-17	23	3	7.66
6	Eoin McGreevy	St Finbarr's	2-16	22	3	7.33
6	Cathail O'Mahony	MItchelstown	2-16	22	4	5.50
8	Anthony O'Connor	Knocknagree	1-16	19	2	9.50
9	Rob O'Mahony	St Finbarr's	2-12	18	3	6.00
9	Mark Cronin	Gabriel Rangers	2-12	18	3	6.00

In a single game

Rank	Player	Club	Tally	Total	Opposition
1	Daniel Ó Duinnín	Cill na Martra	3-06	15	Millstreet
2	Paul Condon	Mayfield	1-11	14	Kildorrery
3	Shane Ó Duinnín	Cill na Martra	1-08	11	Ballinora
3	Rob O'Mahony	St Finbarr's	1-08	11	Gabriel Rangers
5	Ger O'Callaghan	Gabriel Rangers	3-01	10	Glanmire
5	Liam Collins	Rockchapel	2-02	8	Knocknagree
5	Michael Vaughan	Millstreet	1-07	10	Cill na Martra
5	Anthony O'Connor	Knocknagree	0-10	10	Rockchapel
5	Paul Condon	Mayfield	0-10	10	Carrigaline
5	James Murphy	Glanmire	0-10	10	Carrigaline
