= Alan Quirke =

Irish sportsperson (born 1976)

Personal information
- Native name: Ailéin Ó Cuirc (Irish)
- Nickname: Quirkey
- Born: 19 October 1976 (age 50) Innishannon, County Cork, Ireland
- Occupation: Engineer
- Height: 6 ft 4 in (193 cm)

Sport
- Sport: Gaelic Football
- Position: Goalkeeper
Clubs
- Years: Club
- 1994–2015 1997–2000 2001–2008: Valley Rovers → University College Cork → Carrigdhoun
Club titles
- Cork titles: 1
- Munster titles: 1
College
- Years: College
- 1997-2000: University College Cork
College titles
- Sigerson titles: 0
Inter-county*
Years	County	Apps (scores)
1999–2013	Cork	33 (0–00)
Inter-county titles
- Munster titles: 6
- All-Irelands: 1
- NFL: 4
- All Stars: 0
- *Inter County team apps and scores correct as of 6 June 2011.

Alan Quirke (born 19 October 1976 in Innishannon, County Cork, Ireland) is an Irish sportsperson. He plays Gaelic football with his local club Valley Rovers and was a member of the Cork senior inter-county team from 1999 to 2013.

== Playing career ==
=== Club ===
Quirke plays Gaelic football with his local club Valley Rovers and has enjoyed much success with the great club. It was with UCC, however, that he tasted his first major success on the football field. In 1999 Quirke was the goalkeeper on the university's senior football team. That year UCC qualified for the county championship final. Footballing kingpins Nemo Rangers provided the opposition, however, that game ended in a draw. The replay saw UCC prove too strong for Nemo and a merited 1–11 to 1–8 victory gave Quirke a county senior championship winners' medal. UCC later represented the county in the provincial championship and even reached the final. Doonbeg provided the opposition, however, UCC thrashed the Clare champions by 1–17 to 1–7, giving Quirke a Munster club winners' medal. The university's great run of success came to an end with a 2–16 to 3–6 defeat by Crossmaglen Rangers in the All-Ireland semi-final.

In 2008 Quirke was the goalkeeper on the Valley Rovers team that defeated Kildorrery to take the county intermediate championship title. It was his first major success with his home club.

=== Inter-county ===
Quirke first came to prominence on the football scene as a member of the Cork senior inter-county team in 1999. He made his debut against Donegal in the National Football League and was sub goalkeeper to Kevin O'Dwyer for the subsequent championship. He made his first championship start against Waterford in 2001

In 2002 Quirke was sprung from the bench in the replay of the Munster final. On that occasion Cork defeated Tipperary by 1–23 to 0–7, giving him his first Munster winners' medal on the field of play.

In that year he collected a Munster title in this grade following a 2–13 to 0–8 win over Kerry. Cork later qualified for the All-Ireland final with Meath providing the opposition. Cork were the eventual winners by 0–10 to 1–4. This win gave Quirke an All-Ireland winners' medal in the junior grade.

Quirke's performances for the Cork junior team brought his to the attention of the senior selectors. In 2006 he was picked to become the first-choice goalkeeper on the Cork team. After a draw and a replay with Kerry, he added a second Munster winners' medal to his collection. Both sides met again in the subsequent All-Ireland semi-final, a game which saw Kerry win by 0–16 to 0–10.

In 2007 Quirke dislocated his shoulder in the first round of the championship and missed the Munster final defeat by Kerry. Cork later did well in the All-Ireland series after recovering and reclaiming his position as goalkeeper, and qualified for the All-Ireland championship decider against Kerry.

In 2008 Cork gained revenge on Kerry when the sides met again in that year's Munster final. It was Quirke's third Munster winners' medal. Both sides met again in the All-Ireland semi-final, however, after a thrilling draw and a replay Kerry were the team that advanced to the championship decider.

In 2009 Cork began the season well by claiming the National League Division 25 title. Quirke's side later qualified for the Munster final where Limerick provided the opposition. Cork were the red-hot favourites going into the game, however, they were lucky to secure a narrow 2–6 to 0–11 victory. It was Quirke's fourth Munster title on the field of play. Cork later faced Kerry in the All-Ireland final and were surprisingly named as favourites. This tag appeared to be justified when 'the Rebels' led by 1–3 to 0–1 early in the opening half. The Kerry team stuck to their gameplan, helped in no small part by a Cork side that recorded fourteen wides. At the final whistle Kerry were the champions again by 0–16 to 1–9.

In 2010 Cork were still seen as possible All-Ireland contenders. A defeat by Kerry in a replay of the provincial semi-final resulted in Quirke's side being exiled to the back door. After negotiating their way through a difficult series of games, Cork defeated Dublin to qualify for their third All-Ireland final in four years. Down provided the opposition on that occasion in the first meeting between these two teams since 1924. Cork got off to a lightning start, however, they eased off and trailed by three points at the interval. Cork went ahead again in the fiftieth minute before stretching the lead to three points. At the full-time whistle Cork were the champions by 0–16 to 0–15 and Quirke picked up an All-Ireland winners' medal. In November 2013 Quirke announced his retirement from inter-county football.

=== Inter-provincial ===
Quirke has also lined out with Munster in the inter-provincial series of games. He was goalkeeper on the Munster team in 2007 and, in spite of reaching the final, Ulster triumphed on that occasion.

=== International Rules ===
In 2006 Quirke was picked for duty with the Ireland international rules football team. He was the only goalkeeper on the panel and played both tests as Ireland were trounced by Australia.

== Honours ==
University College Cork

- Munster Senior Club Football Championship: 1999
- Cork Senior Football Championship: 1999

Valley Rovers

- Cork Premier Intermediate Football Championship: 2009, 2014
- Cork Intermediate Football Championship: 2008

Cork

- All-Ireland Senior Football Championship: 2010
- Munster Senior Football Championship: 1999, 2002, 2006, 2008, 2009, 2012
- National Football League Division 1: 1998-99, 2010, 2011, 2012
- National Football League Division 2: 2009
- All-Ireland Junior Football Championship: 2005
- Munster Junior Football Championship: 2005
