= 1970 Cork Intermediate Football Championship =

Gaelic football competition

- Dates: 19 April – 15 November 1970
- Teams: 9
- Champions: St Finbarr's (2nd title); Pat Lougheed (captain)
- Runners-up: Youghal

Tournament statistics
- Matches played: 8
- Goals scored: 24 (3 per match)
- Points scored: 147 (18.38 per match)

The 1970 Cork Intermediate Football Championship was the 35th staging of the Cork Intermediate Football Championship since its establishment by the Cork County Board in 1909. The draw for the first round fixtures took place on 25 January 1970. The championship ran from 19 April to 15 November 1970.

The final, which was a replay, was played on 15 November 1970 at the Athletic Grounds in Cork, between St Finbarr's and Youghal, in what was their first ever meeting in the final. St Finbarr's won the match by 3–06 to 1–07 to claim their first second championship title overall and a first title in 40 years.

== Results ==
=== First round ===
19 April 1970 First round	Kilmurry	2-06 - 2-05	Dohenys	Charlie Hurley Park

=== Second round ===
19 April 1970 Second round	Newcestown	1-05 - 1-07	Canovee	Charlie Hurley Park

17 May 1970 Second round	St Finbarr's	0-12 - 0-08	Wolfe Tones	Bishop Casey Memorial Park

14 June 1970 Second round	Youghal	3-08 - 2-04	St Vincent's	Clonmult Memorial Park

14 June 1970 Second round	Kilmurry	0-16 - 0-10	Urhan	Wolfe Tone Park

=== Semi-finals ===
5 July 1970 Semi-final	Canovee	0-11 - 1-11	St Finbarr's	Páirc Uí Chonchúir

4 October 1970 Semi-final	Youghal	3-08 - 3-07	Kilmurry	Cork Athletic Grounds

=== Final ===
18 October 1970 Final	St Finbarr's	1-08 - 1-08	Youghal	Cork Athletic Grounds

=== Final replay ===
15 November 1970 Final replay	St Finbarr's	3-06 - 1-07	Youghal	Cork Athletic Grounds
