= 1981 Cork Intermediate Football Championship =

Gaelic football competition

- Champions: Kildorrery (1st title)
- Runners-up: Glanmire

The 1981 Cork Intermediate Football Championship was the 46th staging of the Cork Intermediate Football Championship since its establishment by the Cork County Board in 1909.

The final was played on 16 August 1981 at Páirc Mac Gearailt in Fermoy, between Kildorrery and Glanmire, in what was their first ever meeting in the final. Kildorrery won the match by 0-10 to 0-08 to claim their first ever championship title.

== Results ==
=== Final ===
16 August 1981 Final	Kildorrery	0-10 - 0-08	Glanmire	Páirc Mac Gearailt
				Referee: D O'Connor (Bishopstown)
