= 1935 Cork Intermediate Football Championship =

Gaelic football competition

- Champions: Dromtarriffe (1st title)
- Runners-up: St Columba's

The 1935 Cork Intermediate Football Championship was the 26th staging of the Cork Intermediate Football Championship since its establishment by the Cork County Board in 1909.

The final was played on 20 October 1935 at the Castle Grounds in Macroom, between Dromtarriffe and St Columba's, in what was their first ever meeting in the final. Dromtarriffe won the match by 1–07 to 0–02 to claim their first ever championship title.

== Results ==
=== Final ===
20 October 1935 Final	Dromtarriffe	1-07 - 0-02	St Columba's	Castle Grounds
