= 1932 Cork Junior Football Championship =

Irish Gaelic football competition

- Champions: Kinsale (2nd title)
- Runners-up: Dromtarriffe

The 1932 Cork Junior Football Championship was the 34th staging of the Cork Junior Football Championship since its establishment by the Cork County Board in 1895.

The final was played on 13 November 1932 at the Mardyke, between Kinsale and Dromtarriffe, in what was their first ever meeting in the final. Kinsale won the match by 1–02 to 0–01 to claim their second championship title overall and a first title in 32 years.

== Results ==
=== Final ===
13 November 1932 Final	Kinsale	1-02 - 0-01	Dromtarriffe	The Mardyke
