= 1930 Cork Intermediate Football Championship =

Gaelic football competition

- Champions: St Finbarr's (1st title); P. Long (captain)
- Runners-up: Dromtarriffe; J. O'Mahony (captain)

The 1930 Cork Intermediate Football Championship was the 21st staging of the Cork Intermediate Football Championship since its establishment by the Cork County Board in 1909.

The final was played on 14 September 1930 at the Athletic Grounds in Cork, between St Finbarr's and Dromtarriffe, in what was their first ever meeting in the final. St Finbarr's won the match by 2–03 to 1–01 to claim their first ever championship title.

== Results ==
=== Final ===
14 September 1930 Final	St Finbarr's	2-03 - 1-01	Dromtarriffe	Cork Athletic Grounds
