= 2014 Cork Premier Intermediate Football Championship =

- Dates: 3 May 2014 – 19 October 2014
- Teams: 16
- Sponsor: Evening Echo
- Champions: Valley Rovers (2nd title); Noel O'Donovan (captain); Gerard Slyne (manager)
- Runners-up: Na Piarsaigh; Diarmuid McDonnell (manager)
- Relegated: Glenville

Tournament statistics
- Matches played: 31
- Top scorer(s): Mícheál Ó Cróinín (2-26)

The 2014 Cork Premier Intermediate Football Championship was the ninth staging of the Cork Premier Intermediate Football Championship since its establishment by the Cork County Board in 2006. The championship began on 3 May 2014 and ended on 19 October 2014.

On 19 October 2014, Valley Rovers won the championship following a 0-12 to 0-08 defeat of Na Piarsaigh in the final at Páirc Uí Chaoimh. It was their second championship title overall and their first title since 2009.

== Team changes ==
=== To Championship ===
Promoted from the Cork Intermediate Football Championship

- Grenagh

Relegated from the Cork Senior Football Championship

- Newmarket

=== From Championship ===
Promoted to the Cork Senior Football Championship

- Clyda Rovers

Relegated to the Cork Intermediate Football Championship

- Kinsale

== Results ==
=== Round 1 ===
3 May 2014 Round 1	Bantry Blues	0-13 - 2-06	Na Piarsaigh	Sam Maguire Park
	R Deane 0-6, D Power 0-2, D Casey 0-2, S Coughlan 0-1, G Canty 0-1, S Drummey 0-1.		S O'Connor 1-0, J O'Rourke 1-0, K Buckley 0-3, J Gardiner 0-1, C O'Mahony 0-1, P Murphy 0-1.

3 May 2014 Round 1	Béal Átha'n Ghaorthaidh	0-07 - 1-08	Macroom	Kilmichael
	B Seartan 0-3, T Ó Laoire 0-2, A Ó Coinceannán 0-1, E Ó Duinnín 0-1.		I Casey 1-0, F Goold 0-3, P Lucey 0-2, D Horgan 0-2, D Cotter 0-1.

3 May 2014 Round 1	Valley Rovers	0-07 - 0-04	Ballinora	Páirc Liam Mhic Cárthaigh
	D Murphy 0-2, E Manning 0-2, H O'Donovan 0-2, S Manning 0-1.		M Murphy 0-2, I Wycherley 0-2.

4 May 2014 Round 1	Newmarket	2-13 - 0-08	Kiskeam	Patsy O'Sullivan Memorial Park
	D Culloty 0-5, B O'Connor 1-0, T O'Keeffe 1-0, M Cottrell 0-3, J Lane 0-2, T Brosnan 0-1, D Hannon 0-1, B Daly 0-1.		B Dennehy 0-3, T O'Sullivan 0-2, M Herlihy 0-1, G Casey 0-1, M Casey 0-1.

10 May 2014 Round 1	Glenville	0-08 - 3-08	Carrigaline	Páirc Uí Rinn
	P Cahill 0-4, N O'Riordan 0-1, W Connolly 0-1, J Foley 0-1, K O'Neill 0-1.		S O'Brien 1-2, K McIntyre 1-2, K Kavanagh 1-1, D Drake 0-2, S Griffin 0-1.

10 May 2014 Round 1	Castletownbere	0-08 - 1-11	St. Michael's	St. Mary's Park
	D Murphy 0-4, J Walsh 0-2, A O'Sullivan 0-1, T Collins 0-1.		M Ryan 1-0, M Drummond 0-3, E Hegarty 0-3, P Cronin 0-2, E Buckley 0-1, P Doyle 0-1, A Nolan 0-1.

11 May 2014 Round 1	Naomh Abán	1-07 - 2-09	Nemo Rangers	Coachford Sportsfield
	M Ó Cróinín 1-4, M Ó Duinnín 0-2, D Ó Liatháin 0-1.		S O'Brien 1-3, C Horgan 0-4, M Kearney 1-0, A O'Donovan 0-1, W Morgan 0-1.

11 May 2014 Round 1	Mallow	1-07 - 1-11	Grenagh	Mourne Abbey
	C O'Riordan 1-4, R Harkin 0-2, K Sheehan 0-1.		DD Dorgan 0-6, U Duggan 1-0, G Russell 0-3, C O'Neill 0-1, C Fitzgerald 0-1.

=== Round 2 ===
18 May 2014 Round 2	Ballinora	3-12 - 0-13 (aet)	Kiskeam	Páirc Eoin Mhic Charthaigh
	M Murphy 1-2, B Ahern 0-5, A O'Connor 1-1, G O'Halloran 1-0, B Crowley 0-1, I Wycherley 0-1, P Fitton 0-1, C Murphy 0-1,		T O'Sullivan 0-4, M Herlihy 0-3, G Casey 0-2, T Dennehy 0-1, D Fitzgerald 0-1, B Dennehy 0-1, D Scannell 0-1.

7 June 2014 Round 2	Castletownbere	3-07 - 3-12	Mallow	St. Mary's Park
	D Fenton 1-2, G Murphy 1-2, G Healy 0-1, D Murphy 0-1, L Harrington 0-1, J Walsh 0-1.		K Sheehan 0-6, D Relihan 1-1, R Harkin 1-1, C Stanton 1-0, P Herlihy 0-1, E Murphy 0-1, E Stanton 0-1, C O'Riordan 0-1.

14 June 2014 Round 2	Béal Átha'n Ghaorthaidh	3-11 - 1-08	Glenville	Cloughduv
	T Ó Laoire 2-0, A Ó Coinceannáin 1-3, B Seartan 0-5, L Ó Conchúir 0-1, E Ó Duinnín 0-1, D Ó Duinnín 0-1.		D O'Donovan 1-1, P Cahill 0-4, E Barry 0-1, N O'Riordan 0-1, B Healy 0-1.

28 June 2014 Round 2	Na Piarsaigh	1-12 - 0-07	Naomh Abán	Kilmurry
	M Ó Cróinín 1-8, M Ó Liatháin 0-2, S Mac Cárthaigh 0-1, T Ó Scanaill 0-1.		S O'Connor 0-3, S Duggan 0-2, P Murphy 0-1, K Buckley 0-1.

=== Round 3 ===
5 July 2014 Round 3	Na Piarsaigh	2-12 - 2-08	Kiskeam	Mallow GAA Complex
	S Warren 2-1, P Murphy 0-3, K Buckley 0-3, P Gould 0-2, J O'Rourke 0-1, S O'Connor 0-1, D Mannix 0-1.		M Herlihy 1-3, D Scannell 1-0, B Dennehy 0-3, G Casey 0-1, T Dennehy 0-1.

12 July 2014 Round 3	Castletownbere	2-10 - 1-08	Glenville	Castletown-Kinneigh
	R Dillane 1-1, D Bán O'Sullivan 1-0, A O'Sullivan 0-3, J Walsh 0-2, D Fenton 0-2, L Harrington 0-1, G Murphy 0-1.		P Cahill 0-4, J Halbert 1-0, K Coakley 1-0, D O'Donovan 0-2, PJ O'Donoghue 0-1, A Cronin 0-1.

=== Relegation playoff ===
5 September 2009 Playoff	Glenville	2-10 - 3-17	Kiskeam	Mallow GAA Complex
	P Cahill 1-3, K O'Neill 1-0, N O'Riordan 0-3, W Connolly 0-1, K Coakley 0-1, J Halbert 0-1, E O'Reilly 0-1.		D Scannell 0-9, M Herlihy 2-2, A O'Carroll 1-2, S O'Sullivan 0-2, T O'Sullivan 0-1, R O'Carroll 0-1.

=== Round 4 ===
20 July 2014 Round 4	Béal Átha'n Ghaorthaidh	1-14 - 0-18	Nemo Rangers	Kilmurry
	B Seartan 1-3, C Ó Duinnín 0-3, L Seartan 0-3, A Ó Coinceannáin 0-2, N Ó Duinnín 0-1, T Ó Laoire 0-1, A Ó Loingsigh 0-1.		D Nation 0-4, W Morgan 0-3, C Horgan 0-3, S Martin 0-2, C Allen 0-2, B O'Driscoll 0-2, A O'Donovan 0-1, J Kerins 0-1.

20 July 2014 Round 4	Ballinora	3-11 - 1-17	Naomh Abán	Cloughduv
	P Fitton 1-2, B Ahern 1-1, M Hodge 1-0, M Murphy 0-2, A O'Neill 0-2, C Murphy 0-1, C Brosnan 0-1, I Wycherley 0-1, A O'Connor 0-1.		M Ó Cróinín 0-7, M Ó Liatháin 1-0, D Ó Liatháin 0-3, M Ó Laoire 0-2, M Ó Duinnín 0-2, S Ó Laoire 0-2, S Mac Cárthaigh 0-1.

27 July 2014 Round 4	St. Michael's	1-07 - 2-07	Bantry Blues	Kilmichael
	P Cronin 0-4, M Drummond 1-0, A Nolan 0-1, M Mulconroy 0-1, A O'Connell 0-1.		S Drummey 1-3, D Power 1-1, D Barron 0-2, S Coughlan 0-1.

9 August 2014 Round 4	Castletownbere	0-13 - 1-13	Na Piarsaigh	Ballingeary
	G Murphy 0-5, A O'Sullivan 0-2, D Fenton 0-2, T Collins 0-1, L Harrington 0-1, L Hanley 0-1, J Harrington 0-1.		K Buckley 1-2, S Duggan 0-2, C O'Mahony 0-2, P Gould 0-2, S Warren 0-1, P Rourke 0-1, J Gardiner 0-1, D Mannix 0-1, P Murphy 0-1.

10 August 2014 Round 4 replay	Ballinora	0-09 - 0-10	Naomh Abán	Cloughduv
	I Wycherley 0-4, M Murphy 0-2, B Ahern 0-2, A O'Connor 0-1,		M Ó Cróinín 0-6, M Ó Liatháin 0-1, S Ó Laoire 0-1, D Ó Ceallaigh 0-1, M Ó Duinnín 0-1.

10 August 2014 Round 4	Mallow	2-14 - 1-05	Newmarket	Kanturk
	D Relihan 2-2, C O'Riordan 0-4, E Murphy 0-2, A Sheehan 0-2, R Harkin 0-2, C Stanton 0-1, K Sheehan 0-1.		M Cottrell 1-0, J Ryan 0-3, P O'Toole 0-1, TJ Brosnan 0-1.

16 August 2014 Round 4	Carrigaline	2-11 - 0-07	Macroom	Charlie Hurley Park
	D Drake 1-3, B O'Keeffe 1-0, K McIntyre 0-3, B Coakley 0-3, N Coakley 0-2.		F Goold 0-3, P Lucey 0-2, T Dineen 0-1, C O'Sullivan 0-1.

=== Quarter-finals ===
16 August 2014 Quarter-final	Grenagh	0-10 - 1-13	Valley Rovers	Páirc Uí Rinn
	DD Dorgan 0-7, U Duggan 0-2, T Walsh 0-1.		J Cottrell 0-6, E Fallon 1-0, H O'Donovan 0-2, F Lynch 0-2, K Canty 0-1, D Crowley 0-1. S Manning 0-1.

23 August 2014 Quarter-final	Naomh Abán	0-07 - 0-12	Bantry Blues	Ballingeary
	D Ó Ceallaigh 0-2, S Ó Laoire 0-1, A Ó Loingsigh 0-1, N Ó Ceallaigh 0-1, S Ó Riada 0-1, M Ó Cróinín 0-1.		S Coughlan 0-4, S Drummey 0-3, D Barron 0-3, D Daly 0-1, D Power 0-1.

30 August 2014 Quarter-final	Mallow	1-04 - 0-07	Na Piarsaigh	Blarney
	E Stanton 1-0, C O'Riordan 0-3, C Stokes 0-1.		S Duggan 0-3, C O'Mahony 0-2, P Murphy 0-1, S Glasgow 0-1.

31 August 2014 Quarter-final	Carrigaline	0-12 - 1-09	Nemo Rangers	Riverstick
	D Drake 0-4, K McIntyre 0-3, S O'Brien 0-2, N Coakley 0-2, B Coakley 0-1.		E McCarthy 1-0, C Allen 0-2, S Martin 0-1, C Kerins 0-1, J Kerins 0-1, D Niblock 0-1, C O'Donovan 0-1, M Dorgan 0-1, C O'Shea 0-1.

13 September 2014 Quarter-final replay	Carrigaline	2-09 - 3-05	Nemo Rangers	Páirc Liam Mhic Cárthaigh
	B Coakley 1-2, N Coakley 0-4, D Drake 1-0, K McIntyre 0-2, B O'Keeffe 0-1.		A Morgan 2-0, S Martin 1-0, E McCarthy 0-2, M Dorgan 0-1, C O'Donovan 0-1, K Weldon 0-1.

20 September 2014 Quarter-final replay	Mallow	1-11 - 3-09	Na Piarsaigh	Blarney
	C O'Riordan 0-5, D Relihan 1-0, J Loughrey 0-1, C Stokes 0-1, R Harkin 0-1, E Murphy 0-1, E O'Carroll 0-1, E Stanton 0-1.		K Buckley 2-1, A Keating 1-0, C O'Mahony 0-3, S Warren 0-2, S Glasgow 0-1, P Rourke 0-1, P Gould 0-1.

=== Semi-finals ===
27 September 2014 Semi-final	Carrigaline	0-13 - 3-13	Valley Rovers	Páirc Liam Mhic Cárthaigh
	N Coakley 0-3, B Coakley 0-3, S O'Brien 0-2, N Murphy 0-1, K McIntyre 0-1, K Kavanagh 0-1, D Drake 0-1, B O'Keeffe 0-1.		F Lynch 2-7, J Cottrell 1-1, H O'Donovan 0-3, D Lynch 0-1, D Murphy 0-1.

5 October 2014 Semi-final	Bantry Blues	0-09 - 0-11	Na Piarsaigh	Castle Grounds
	S Coughlan 0-4, D Barron 0-2, S O'Neill 0-1, D Daly 0-1, S Drummey 0-1.		C O'Mahony 0-5, A Hogan 0-2, K Buckley 0-1, S Glasgow 0-1, P Gould 0-1, S Duggan 0-1.

=== Final ===
19 October 2014 Final	Valley Rovers	0-12 - 0-08	Na Piarsaigh	Páirc Uí Chaoimh
	H O’Donovan (two frees, one 45), J Murphy 0-3 each, J Cottrell (frees), K Canty 0-2 each, F Lynch, B Murphy 0-1 each.		C O’Mahony, S Glasgow (free) 0-2 each, G Fitzgerald, J Gardiner, A Hogan, S Duggan 0-1 each.	Referee: D Murnane (Macroom)

== Championship statistics ==
=== Top scorers ===
Overall

Rank	Player	Club	Tally	Total	Matches	Average
1	Mícheál Ó Cróinín	Naomh Abán	2-26	32	5	6.40
2	Keith Buckley	Na Piarsaigh	3-11	20	6	3.66
2	Cian O'Riordan	Mallow	1-17	20	5	4.00
3	Michael Herlihy	Kiskeam	3-09	18	4	4.50
3	Paudie Cahill	Glenville	1-15	18	4	4.50
4	Fiachra Lynch	Valley Rovers	2-10	16	4	4.00
4	David Drake	Carrigaline	2-10	16	5	3.20
5	Donal Relihan	Mallow	4-03	15	5	3.00
5	Cian O'Mahony	Na Piarsaigh	0-15	15	6	2.50
6	Ben Seartan	Mallow	1-11	14	3	4.66

In a single game

Rank	Player	Club	Tally	Total	Opposition
1	Fiachra Lynch	Valley Rovers	2-07	13	Carrigaline
2	Mícheál Ó Cróinín	Naomh Abán	1-08	11	Na Piarsaigh
3	David Scannell	Kiskeam	0-09	9	Glenville
4	Michael Herlihy	Kiskeam	2-02	8	Glenville
4	Donal Relihan	Mallow	2-02	8	Newmarket
5	Seán Warren	Na Piarsaigh	2-01	7	Kiskeam
5	Keith Buckley	Na Piarsaigh	2-01	7	Mallow
5	Mícheál Ó Cróinín	Naomh Abán	1-04	7	Nemo Rangers
5	Cian O'Riordan	Mallow	1-04	7	Grenagh
5	Mícheál Ó Cróinín	Naomh Abán	0-07	7	Ballinora
5	D. D. Dorgan	Grenagh	0-07	7	Valley Rovers
