= 1922 Cork Intermediate Football Championship =

Irish hurling competition

The 1922 Cork Intermediate Football Championship was the 13th staging of the Cork Intermediate A Football Championship since its establishment by the Cork County Board in 1909.

The championship was unfinished after the Cork County Board decided to suspend it because of the ongoing War Of Independence.
