= 1945 Cork Intermediate Hurling Championship =

Irish hurling competition

- Champions: 31st Battalion (1st title)
- Runners-up: Oldcastletown

The 1945 Cork Intermediate Hurling Championship was the 36th staging of the Cork Intermediate Hurling Championship since its establishment by the Cork County Board in 1909.

The final was played on 9 September 1945 at Fermoy Sportsfield, between 31st Battalion and Oldcastletown, in what was their first ever meeting in the final. 31st Battalion won the match by 3–11 to 4–04 to claim their first ever championship title.

== Results ==
=== Final ===
9 September 1945 Final	31st Battalion	3-11 - 0-04	Oldcastletown	Fermoy Sportsfield
