= 1976 Cork Intermediate Football Championship =

Gaelic football competition

- Champions: Glanworth (1st title)
- Runners-up: Naomh Abán

The 1976 Cork Intermediate Football Championship was the 41st staging of the Cork Intermediate Football Championship since its establishment by the Cork County Board in 1909. The draw for the opening round fixtures took place on 24 January 1976.

The final was played on 12 September 1976 at Páirc Uí Chaoimh in Cork, between Glanworth and Naomh Abán, in what was their first ever meeting in the final. Glanworth won the match by 1-10 to 2-06 to claim their first ever championship title.

== Results ==
=== Final ===
12 September 1976 Final	Glanworth	1-10 - 2-06	Naomh Abán	Páirc Uí Chaoimh
