= 1943 Cork Junior Hurling Championship =

Irish hurling competition

- Teams: 7
- Champions: Oldcastletown (1st title)
- Runners-up: Glen Rovers

The 1943 Cork Junior Hurling Championship was the 46th staging of the Cork Junior Hurling Championship since its establishment by the Cork County Board in 1895.

The final was played on 28 November 1943 at Fermoy Sportsfield, between Oldcastletown and Glen Rovers, in what was their first ever meeting in the final. Oldcastletown won the match by 3-04 to 2-00 to claim their first ever championship title.

== Results ==
=== Final ===
28 November 1943 Final	Oldcastletown	3-04 - 2-00	Glen Rovers	Fermoy Sportsfield
