= Cathail O'Mahony =

Irish Gaelic footballer

Personal information
- Native name: Cathail Ó Mathúna (Irish)
- Born: 1999 (age 26–27) Mitchelstown, County Cork, Ireland
- Occupation: Student

Sport
- Sport: Gaelic Football
- Position: Full-forward
Club
- Years: Club
- 2017-present: Mitchelstown Ballygiblin
Club titles
- Cork titles: 0
College
- Years: College
- Mary Immaculate College
College titles
- Sigerson titles: 0
Inter-county*
Years	County	Apps (scores)
2019-present	Cork	1 (0-01)
Inter-county titles
- Munster titles: 0
- All-Irelands: 0
- NFL: 0
- All Stars: 0
- *Inter County team apps and scores correct as of 23:53, 21 November 2020.

Cathail O'Mahony (born 1999) is an Irish Gaelic footballer who plays for Cork Intermediate Championship club Mitchelstown and at inter-county level with the Cork senior football team. He usually lines out as a full-forward.

== Career statistics ==
=== Club ===
As of match played 4 October 2020.

Team	Season	Cork IAFC	
Team	Season	Apps	Score
Mitchelstown	2017	6	3-14
Mitchelstown	2018	4	2-16
Mitchelstown	2019	3	1-06
Mitchelstown	2020	5	5-28
Career total		18	11-64

=== Inter-county ===
As of match played 13 June 2021.

Team	Year	National League			Munster		All-Ireland		Total	
Team	Year	Division	Apps	Score	Apps	Score	Apps	Score	Apps	Score
Cork	2020	Division 3	5	0-18	1	0-01	—		6	0-19
Cork	2021	Division 2	3	0-14	0	0-00	0	0-00	3	0-14
Career total			8	0-32	1	0-01	0	0-00	9	0-33

== Honours ==
Mitchelstown

- Cork Premier 2 Minor Football Championship (1): 2016

Cork

- National Football League Division 3 (1): 2020
- All-Ireland Under-20 Football Championship (1): 2019
- Munster Under-20 Football Championship (1): 2019
