= 2008 Cork Intermediate Football Championship =

Gaelic football competition

- Sponsor: Evening Echo
- Champions: Valley Rovers (1st title)
- Runners-up: Kildorrery

The 2008 Cork Intermediate Football Championship was the 73rd staging of the Cork Intermediate Football Championship since its establishment by the Cork County Board in 1909.

The final was played on 12 October 2008 at Páirc Uí Rinn in Cork, between Valley Rovers and Kildorrery, in what was their first ever meeting in the final. Valley Rovers won the match by 1–12 to 3–04 to claim their first ever championship title.

== Results ==
=== Final ===
13 October 2008 Final	Valley Rovers	1-12 - 3-04	Kildorrery	Páirc Uí Rinn
	H O’Donovan 0-5 (0-4f, 0-1 ‘45), F Lynch 1-2, E Collins 0-2, E Manning, J Burke, J Young 0-1 each.		P O’Brien 1-1 (1-0 pen), J Ahern, D White 1-0 each, E O’Connor, A O’Brien, J McCarthy 0-1 each.
