= 1998 Cork Intermediate Football Championship =

Gaelic football competition

- Sponsor: Permanent TSB
- Champions: St. Michael's (1st title); Damien O'Callaghan (captain); John Egan (manager)
- Runners-up: St. Finbarr's; Paddy Hayes (captain)

The 1998 Cork Intermediate Football Championship was the 63rd staging of the Cork Intermediate Football Championship since its establishment by the Cork County Board in 1909. The draw for the opening round fixtures took place on 8 December 1996.

The final was played on 14 November 1998 at Ballinlough Park in Ballinlough, between St. Michael's and St. Finbarr's, in what was their first ever meeting in a final. St. Michael's won the match by 1–11 to 0–08 to claim their second championship title overall and a first title in 29 years.

== Results ==
=== Final ===
14 November 1998 Final	St. Michael's	1-11 - 0-08	St. Finbarr's	Ballinlough Park
	A Ryan 0-4, F Barry 1-0, J Flynn 0-3, D O'Connell 0-2, K O'Connell 0-1, B O'Keeffe 0-1.		I O'Mahony 0-3, T Olden 0-2, I Keeler 0-2, C McCarthy 0-1.	Referee: R O'Sullivan (Kilmurry)
