= 1997 Cork Junior A Football Championship =

- Dates: 5 October – 7 December 1997
- Teams: 8
- Champions: Ballinora (1st title)
- Runners-up: Kiskeam

Tournament statistics
- Matches played: 8
- Goals scored: 17 (2.13 per match)
- Points scored: 139 (17.38 per match)

The 1997 Cork Junior A Football Championship was the 99th staging of the Cork Junior A Football Championship since its establishment by Cork County Board in 1895. The championship ran from 5 October to 7 December 1997

The final was played on 7 December 1997 at the Carrigadrohid Grounds, between Ballinora and Kiskeam, in what was their first ever meeting in the final. Ballinora won the match by 0–12 to 2–05 to claim their first ever championship title.

== Qualification ==
Division	Championship	Champions
Avondhu	North Cork Junior A Football Championship	Fermoy
Beara	Beara Junior A Football Championship	Garnish
Carbery	South West Junior A Football Championship	Tadhg Mac Carthaigh
Carrigdhoun	South East Junior A Football Championship	Courcey Rovers
Duhallow	Duhallow Junior A Football Championship	Kiskeam
Imokilly	East Cork Junior A Football Championship	Carrigtwohill
Muskerry	Mid Cork Junior A Football Championship	Ballinora
Seandún	City Junior A Football Championship	Mayfield

== Results ==
=== Quarter-finals ===
5 October 1997 Quarter-final	Tadhg Mac Carthaigh	0–10 – 1–07	Fermoy	Church Road

18 October 1997 Quarter-final	Ballinora	2–13 – 2–07	Courcey Rovers	Ballinhassig Grounds

25 October 1997 Quarter-final	Kiskeam	3–09 – 1–12	Carrigtwohill	O'Connel Park

25 October 1997 Quarter-final replay	Tadhg Mac Carthaigh	1–11 – 0–09	Fermoy	Church Road

26 October 1997 Quarter-final	Garnish	2–10 – 1–09	Mayfield	Rossa Park

=== Semi-finals ===
2 November 1997 Semi-final	Kiskeam	1–07 – 0–09	Tadhg Mac Carthaigh	Coachford Grounds

23 November 1997 Semi-final	Ballinora	1–04 – 0–05	Garnish	Ballingeary Grounds

=== Final ===
7 December 1997 Final	Ballinora	0–12 – 2–05	Kiskeam	Carrigadrohid
