= 1932 Cork Intermediate Hurling Championship =

Hurling competition

- Champions: Ballinora (1st title); C. Horgan (captain)
- Runners-up: Buttevant; J. Byrne (captain)

The 1932 Cork Intermediate Hurling Championship was the 23rd staging of the Cork Intermediate Hurling Championship since its establishment by the Cork County Board in 1909.

The final was played on 11 September 1932 at the Mardyke in Cork, between Ballinora and Buttevant, in what was their first ever meeting in the final. Ballinora won the match by 2–05 to 1–03 to claim their first ever championship title.

== Results ==
=== Final ===
11 September 1932 Final	Ballinora	2-05 – 1-03	Buttevant	The Mardyke
