= 1988 Cork Intermediate Football Championship =

Gaelic football competition

- Dates: 7 May - 11 September 1988
- Teams: 15
- Champions: Kilshannig (1st title); William O'Riordan (captain); John O'Mahony (manager)
- Runners-up: Ballincollig

Tournament statistics
- Matches played: 17
- Goals scored: 25 (1.47 per match)
- Points scored: 279 (16.41 per match)
- Top scorer(s): William O'Riordan (2-17)

The 1988 Cork Intermediate Football Championship was the 53rd staging of the Cork Intermediate Football Championship since its establishment by the Cork County Board in 1909. The draw for the opening round fixtures took place at the Cork Convention on 13 December 1987. The championship began on 7 May 1988 and ended on 11 September 1988.

On 11 September 1988, Kilshannig won the championship following a 2–09 to 1–07 defeat of Ballincollig in the final. This was their first ever championship title. It remains their only championship title in the grade.

Kilshannig's William O'Riordan was the championship's top scorer with 2–17.

== Results ==
=== First round ===
7 May 1988 First round	Kilshannig	1-08 - 0-10	Nemo Rangers	Coachford
	W O'Riordan 1-5, P O'Connell 0-1, É O'Sullivan 0-1, G O'Sullivan 0-1.		G O'Regan 0-4, C Murphy 0-3, S Hayes 0-1, D O'Sullivan 0-1, P Galvin 0-1.

7 May 1988 First round	Doneraile	1-11 - 3-05	Douglas	Rathcormac
	N Landy 1-1, K Stack 0-3, P Nelligan 0-3, P Harrington 0-2, T Mannix 0-1, C Hannon 0-1.		A Cotter 2-0, M O'Regan 1-0, D O'Leary 0-2, D Larkin 0-1, P Lynch 0-1, J Horgan 0-1.	Referee: B Cody (Midleton)

8 May 1988 First round	Bantry Blues	0-08 - 1-05	Rockchapel	Ballyvourney
	S Dineen 0-4, B Terry 0-3, J Cotter 0-1.		Joe Casey 1-4, A O'Mahony 0-1.	Referee: L Ware (Ballyvourney)

8 May 1988 First round	Mallow	0-07 - 0-13	Ballincollig	Donoughmore
	R Sheehan 0-3, S Browne 0-2, S Murphy 0-1, D Buckley 0-1.		T O'Reilly 0-4, D Burke 0-2, D Lucey 0-2, D Murphy 0-2, C O'Connell 0-1, D O'Driscoll 0-1, B McCarthy 0-1.	Referee: J O'Mahony (Kanturk)

8 May 1988 First round	Valley Rovers	0-13 - 1-02	Bishopstown	Ballygarvan
	G Slyne 0-7, P O'Sullivan 0-2, A Crowley 0-2, P Coleman 0-1, B O'Sullivan 0-1.		J Cronin 1-0, M Buckley 0-2.

8 May 1988 First round	Mayfield	0-07 - 1-08	Kilmurry	Inniscarra
	J Coomey 0-2, J Nodwell 0-1, J Conroy 0-1, D Kennedy 0-1, S O'Donovan 0-1.		C Barry-Murphy 0-5, S Kearney 1-0, S Murphy 0-1, D O'Sullivan 0-1, G Lally 0-1.

15 May 1988 First round replay	Bantry Blues	0-07 - 1-11	Rockchapel	Ballyvourney
	B Terry 0-3, G Lynch 0-2, S Dineen 0-1, J Cotter 0-1.		T Carroll 1-3, Jerry Casey 0-3, A O'Mahony 0-2, Joe Casey 0-1, D O'Mahony 0-1, S Curtin 0-1.	Referee: L Ware (Ballyvourney)

22 May 1988 First round	Macroom	2-10 - 0-06	Passage	Innishannon
	L Gould 0-6, J Neville 1-1, N Twomey 1-0, D Crowley 0-1, M Browne 0-1, J O'Connor 0-1.		L Lester 0-4, B Harrington 0-1, G Murphy 0-1.	Referee: N Hallahan (Bandon)

11 June 1988 First round replay	Doneraile	0-13 - 1-07	Douglas	Rathcormac
	P Harrington 0-10, G Harrington 0-1, R Landy 0-1, D Cahill 0-1.		F Birmingham 1-1, T Hurley 0-3, D O'Leary 0-1, A Cotter 0-1, M Sheehan 0-1.	Referee: B Cody (Midleton)

- Fermoy received a bye in this round.

=== Second round ===
24 July 1988 Second round	Ballincollig	0-10 - 0-03	Valley Rovers	Ovens
	T O'Reilly 0-4, D Murphy 0-3, D Burke 0-1, N O'Donovan 0-1, D O'Driscoll 0-1.		B O'Sullivan 0-1, TJ Deasy 0-1, P Burke 0-1.	Referee: S O'Keeffe (St. Michael's)

24 July 1988 Second round	Kilmurry	1-07 - 0-10	Doneraile	Glantane
	S Kearney 1-0, D O'Sullivan 0-3, M O'Mahony 0-1, M Kelleher 0-1, S Murphy 0-1.		P Nelligan 0-4, J Landy 0-3, P Harrington 0-1, T Mannix 0-1, N Landy 0-1.	Referee: R Murphy (Lyre)

24 July 1988 Second round	Rockchapel	1-14 - 1-11	Macroom	Boherbue
	DA O'Mahony 1-2, Jerry Casey 0-5, Joe Casey 0-2, J Murphy 0-2, S Curtin 0-1, A O'Mahony 0-1, T O'Callaghan 0-1.		L Gould 0-4, J O'Connor 1-0, J Neville 0-2, G McPolin 0-2, D Crowley 0-1, J White 0-1, S O'Connor 0-1.

24 July 1988 Second round	Kilshannig	1-08 - 1-05	Fermoy	Mallow
	P Murphy 1-1, W O'Riordan 0-3, P O'Connell 0-2, M Murphy 0-1, D O'Connell 0-1.		M Dolan 1-1, D Pyne 0-1, P Donnellan 0-1, T Cooney 0-1, D Coomey 0-1.

7 August 1988 Second round replay	Kilmurry	1-02 - 1-09	Doneraile	Glantane
	D O'Sullivan 1-0, G Lally 0-1, G Linehan 0-1.		J Crowley 1-1, P Harrington 0-3, P Nelligan 0-2, D Cahill 0-2, N Landy 0-1.	Referee: R Murphy (Lyre)

=== Semi-finals ===
21 August 1988 Semi-final	Kilshannig	0-10 - 0-09	Rockchapel	Kanturk
	W O'Riordan 0-5, J O'Donoghue 0-2, É O'Sullivan 0-1, M Murphy 0-1, P O'Connell 0-1.		Jerry Casey 0-4, Joe Casey 0-3, T Carroll 0-1, D O'Mahony 0-1.	Referee: E Porter (Brian Dillons)

4 September 1988 Semi-final	Ballincollig	2-10 - 1-04	Doneraile	Watergrasshill
	T O'Reilly 1-2, B McCarthy 1-2, D O'Driscoll 0-2, C O'Connell 0-1, D Murphy 0-1, P Coomey 0-1, K Coomey 0-1.		T Mannix 1-1, K Stack 0-1, P Nelligan 0-1, B Stack 0-1.	Referee: E Porter (Brian Dillons)

=== Final ===
11 September 1988 Final	Kilshannig	2-09 - 1-07	Ballincollig	Páirc Uí Chaoimh, Cork
	W O'Riordan 1-4, É O'Sullivan 1-1, P O'Connell 0-2, J O'Donoghue 0-1, P Murphy 0-1.		T O'Reilly 1-2, D Murphy 0-3, T Weste 0-1, C O'Connell 0-1.	Referee: J O'Leary

== Championship statistics ==
=== Top scorers ===
Top scorers overall

Rank	Player	Club	Tally	Total	Matches	Average
1	William O'Riordan	Kilshannig	2-17	23	4	5.75
2	Tadhg O'Reilly	Ballincollig	2-12	18	4	4.50
3	Paddy Harrington	Doneraile	0-16	16	5	3.20

Top scorers in a single game

Rank	Player	Club	Tally	Total	Opposition
1	Paddy Harrington	Doneraile	0-10	10	Douglas
2	William O'Riordan	Kilshannig	1-05	8	Nemo Rangers
3	Joe Casey	Rockchapel	1-04	7	Bishopstown
3	William O'Riordan	Kilshannig	1-04	7	Ballincollig
3	Ger Slyne	Valley Rovers	0-07	7	Bishopstown
6	Aidan Cotter	Douglas	2-00	6	Doneraile
6	Tom Carroll	Rockchapel	1-03	6	Bantry Blues
6	Leo Gould	Macroom	0-06	6	Passage
9	Denis A. O'Mahony	Rockchapel	1-02	5	Macroom
9	Tadhg O'Reilly	Ballincollig	1-02	5	Doneraile
9	Brian McCarthy	Ballincollig	1-02	5	Doneraile
9	Tadhg O'Reilly	Ballincollig	1-02	5	Kilshannig
9	C. Barry-Murphy	Kilmurry	0-05	5	Mayfield
9	Jerry Casey	Rockchapel	0-05	5	Macroom
9	William O'Riordan	Kilshannig	0-05	5	Rockchapel
