= Blake Murphy =

Irish Gaelic footballer

Personal information
- Native name: Bláca Ó Murchú (Irish)
- Born: 18 February 2000 (age 26) Cork, Ireland
- Occupation: Electrician

Sport
- Sport: Gaelic football
- Position: Centre-forward
Club
- Years: Club
- 2018-present: St Vincent's
College
- Years: College
- Cork Institute of Technology
College titles
- Sigerson titles: 0
Inter-county*
| Years | County | Apps (scores) |
| 2021- | Cork | 0 (0-00) |
Inter-county titles
- Munster titles: 0
- All-Irelands: 0
- NFL: 0
- All Stars: 0
- *Inter County team apps and scores correct as of 22:33, 11 November 2020.

Blake John Paul Murphy (born 18 February 2000) is an Irish multi-sportsperson. As a Gaelic footballer, he plays for Cork Championship club St Vincent's and at inter-county level with the Cork senior football team. He usually lines out as a forward.

Murphy has played basketball for Ireland and won an All-Ireland hurling title at Under-17 level. He played sparingly for UCC Demons of the Irish Super League during the 2018–19 season.

== Honours ==
Cork

- All-Ireland Under-20 Football Championship: 2019
- Munster Under-20 Football Championship: 2019
- All-Ireland Under-17 Hurling Championship: 2017
- Munster Under-17 Hurling Championship: 2017 (c)
