= Gabriel Rangers GAA =

Gaelic games club in County Cork, Ireland

Gabriel Rangers
- Raonaithe Gabriel
- County: Cork
- Colours: Green and White
- Grounds: Ballydehob
- Coordinates: 51°33′57.65″N 9°27′22.41″W

Playing kits
Standard colours

Gabriel Rangers is a Gaelic Athletic Association club based in the village of Ballydehob in County Cork, Ireland. The club fields team in both Gaelic football and hurling.

== Notable players ==
- Paddy O'Driscoll

== Achievements ==
- Cork Intermediate Football Championship Runners Up 2019
- Munster Junior Club Football Championship Runners up: 2016
- Cork Junior Football Championship Winners 2016
- Cork Minor B Football Championship Winners (3) 1988, 2004, 2017 Runner-Up 2002
- Cork Junior B Hurling Championship Winners (1) 1989
- Carbery Junior A Football Championship Winners (2) 2010, 2016 Runner-Up 1979, 1983, 2005, 2014
- West Cork Junior B Football Championship Winners (1) 1978 Runner-Up 1952 (as Ballydehob), 1977
- West Cork Junior C Football Championship Runner-Up 2007, 2018
- West Cork Junior C Football Championship Winners (1) 1989 Runner-Up 1999
- West Cork Junior D Football Championship Winners (2) 1990, 2002
- West Cork Minor B Football Championship Winners (7) 1987, 1988, 1994, 1996, 2002, 2004, 2017 Runner-Up 1979, 2000
- West Cork Under-21 B Football Championship Winners (4)1981, 2003, 2012, 2021, Runner-Up 1997
- West Cork Under-21 C Football Championship Winners (1) 2007 Runner-Up 2006
- West Cork Junior B Hurling Championship Winners (4) 1950 (as Ballydehob), 1978, 1988, 1989. Runner-Up 1952 (as Ballydehob), 1976, 1987, 1998, 2007
- West Cork Minor A Hurling Championship Winners (1) 1979 Runner-Up 1978, 1991, 1987, 1988, 1989
- West Cork Minor B Hurling Championship Winners (1) 1986 Runner-Up 1978, 1979, 1981, 1994
- West Cork Under-21 B Hurling Championship Winners (3) 1987, 1988, 1992 Runner-Up 1984
