= Ballinora GAA =

GAA club in Cork, Ireland

Ballinora
- Baile Nóra
- Founded: 1924
- County: Cork
- Colours
- Grounds: Ballymah GAA Field

Playing kits
Standard colours

Senior Club Championships
	All Ireland	Munster champions	Cork champions
Football:	0	0	0
Hurling:	0	0	0

Ballinora Hurling & Football Club is a Gaelic Athletic Association club in Ballinora, County Cork, Ireland. The club is affiliated to the Mid Cork Board and fields teams in both Gaelic football and hurling.

== History ==
Located in the village of Ballinora, about 10 km from Cork city, Ballinora GAA Club was established in 1924. The new club focussed on hurling in its early years and won consecutive Mid Cork JAHC titles in 1928 and 1929. Ballinora opted for promotion without winning the Cork JHC title, however, the club claimed the Cork IHC title in 1932 after a 2–05 to 1–03 win over Buttevant.

After a long period without success, Ballinora returned as a dual force in the 1990s. The club claimed the Mid Cork double in 1996 and 1997, before winning the Cork JAFC title after a defeat of Kiskeam. The new century saw Ballinora win their sixth Mid Cork JAHC title in 2016, after a lapse of 19 years. This was followed by five consecutive Mid Cork JAHC titles between 2021 and 2025.

== Honours ==
- Cork Intermediate A Football Championship (1): 2025
- Cork Intermediate A Hurling Championship (1): 1932
- Cork Junior A Football Championship (1): 1997
- Mid Cork Junior A Football Championship (3): 1990, 1996, 1997
- Mid Cork Junior A Hurling Championship (11): 1928, 1929, 1982, 1996, 1997, 2016, 2021, 2022, 2023, 2024, 2025
- Cork Minor B Hurling Championship (1): 1992
- Cork Minor A Football Championship (2): 1987, 1998
