= Cork Intermediate A Football Championship =

Annual Gaelic football competition

- Current season or competition: 2025 Cork Intermediate A Football Championship
- Irish: Craobh Peile Idirmhéanach A Chorcaí
- Code: Gaelic football
- Founded: 1909; 117 years ago
- Region: Cork (GAA)
- Trophy: Seán Ó Súilleabháin Cup
- No. of teams: 12
- Title holders: Ballinora (1st title)
- Most titles: Bantry Blues (6 titles)
- Sponsors: McCarthy Insurance Group
- Official website: Official website

The Cork Intermediate A Football Championship (known for sponsorship reasons as McCarthy Insurance Group Cork County Intermediate A Football Championship and abbreviated to the Cork IAFC) is an annual Gaelic football competition organised by the Cork County Board of the Gaelic Athletic Association and contested by the second tier intermediate clubs in the county of Cork in Ireland. It is the fourth tier overall in the entire Cork football championship system.

The Cork Intermediate Championship was introduced in 1909 as a competition that would bridge the gap between the senior grade and the junior grade. At the time of its creation it was the second tier of Cork football.

In its current format, the Cork Intermediate Championship begins in mid summer. The 12 participating club teams are drawn into three groups of four teams and play each other in a round-robin system. The two group winners proceed to the knockout phase that culminates with the final match at Páirc Uí Chaoimh. The winner of the Cork Intermediate Championship, as well as being presented with the Seán Ó Súilleabháin Cup, gains automatic promotion to the Cork Premier Intermediate Championship for the following season.

Bantry Blues is the most successful teams in the tournament's history, having won it six times. Glanmire are the title-holders, defeating Boherbue by 2–10 to 0–15 in the 2024 final.

== Format ==
=== Development ===
On 2 April 2019, a majority of 136 club delegates voted to restructure the championship. The new format limited the number of participating clubs to 16.

=== Group stage ===
The 12 teams are divided into three groups of four. Over the course of the group stage, which features one game in April and two games in August, each team plays once against the others in the group, resulting in each team being guaranteed at least three games. Two points are awarded for a win, one for a draw and zero for a loss. The teams are ranked in the group stage table by points gained, then scoring difference and then their head-to-head record. The top two teams in each group qualify for the knock-out stage.

=== Knockout stage ===
Following the completion of the group stage, the top two teams from each group are ranked (1–6) in terms of points accumulated and scoring difference. The two top-ranking teams receive byes to separate semi-finals.

- Quarter-finals: Teams designated 3-6 contest this round. The two winners from these two games advance to the semi-finals.
- Semi-finals: The two quarter-final winners and teams designated 1-2 contest this round. The two winners from these two games advance to the final.
- Final: The two semi-final winners contest the final. The winning team are declared champions.

=== Promotion and relegation ===
At the end of the championship, the winning team is automatically promoted to the Cork Premier Intermediate Football Championship for the following season. The three bottom-placed teams from the group stage take part in a series of play-offs, with the losing team being relegated to the Cork Premier Junior Football Championship.

== Teams ==
=== 2025 Teams ===
The 12 teams competing in the 2025 Cork Intermediate A Football Championship are:

Team	Location	Division	Colours	Position in 2024	In Championship since	Championship Titles	Last Championship Title
Adrigole	Adrigole	Beara	Red and white	Semi-finals	2007	1	1979
Ballinora	Ballinora	Muskerry	Green and red	Group stage	1998	0	—
Boherbue	Boherbue	Duhallow	Green and gold	Runners-up	2022	0	—
Dromtarriffe	Rathcoole	Duhallow	Red and white	Group stage	2019	1	1935
Gabriel Rangers	Schull	Carbery	Green and white	Semi-finals	2021	0	—
Glanworth	Glanworth	Avondhu	Green and white	Quarter-finals	2010	1	1976
Ilen Rovers	Baltimore	Carbery	Green and white	Relegated (Cork PIFC)	2025	1	2003
Kildorrery	Kildorrery	Avondhu	Blue and white	Group stage	2008	1	1981
Kilmurry	Kilmurry	Muskerry	Green and gold	Champions (Cork PJFC)	2025	1	1933
Mitchelstown	Mitchelstown	Avondhu	Red and black	Quarter-finals	2014	4	1965
St Finbarr's	Togher	Seandún	Blue and gold	Group stage	2024	2	1970
St Vincent's	Knocknaheeny	Seandún	Green and white	Relegation playoff winners	2023	0	—

== Sponsorship ==
In keeping with its sponsorship deal for all Cork hurling and football championships, Permanent TSB provided the sponsorship since the 1990s. The Evening Echo became the primary sponsors of all Cork hurling and football championships in 2005 and have continued their sponsorship ever since. McCarthy Insurance Group became the new title sponsor in December 2023.

== Venues ==
=== Early rounds ===
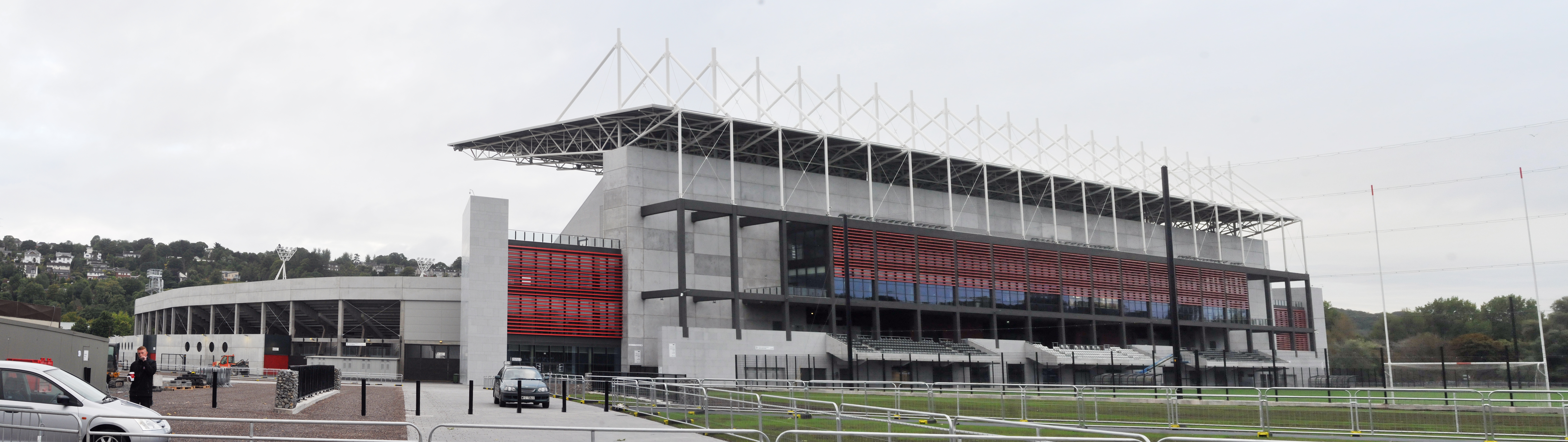
The rebuilt Páirc Uí Chaoimh hosted the 2018 final between Cill na Martra and Aghabullogue.

Fixtures in the opening rounds of the championship are usually played at a neutral venue that is deemed halfway between the participating teams.

=== Final ===
The final has always been played at one of Cork GAA's two main stadiums. On several occasions the final has been played at Páirc Uí Chaoimh as the curtain raiser to the senior final, however, in recent times Páirc Uí Rinn has been the venue of choice for the final.

== Trophy ==
The winning team is presented with the Seán Ó Súilleabháin Cup. A secondary school teacher by profession, John Lock O'Sullivan (1976–2002) played with the Adrigole club and the Beara divisional team, with whom he won the Cork Senior Championship in 1997. He also lined out for Cork as a member of the under-21 and junior teams. O'Sullivan died suddenly on 19 November 2002.

== List of finals ==
Year	Winners		Runners-up	
Year	Club	Score	Club	Score
2024	Glanmire	2–10	Boherbue	0–15
2023	Aghabullogue	2–13	Mitchelstown	1–15
2022	Kilshannig	1–16	Aghabullogue	0–10
2021	Iveleary	0-20	Mitchelstown	0-07
2020	Rockchapel	1–10	Mitchelstown	0-09
2019	Knocknagree	2–10	Gabriel Rangers	1–11
2018	Cill Na Martra	2–17	Aghabullogue	1–10
2017	Kanturk	0–14	Mitchelstown	0–13
2016	Bandon	1–10	Rockchapel	1-07
2015	Fermoy	0-07, 1-12 (R)	Mayfield	0-07, 0-09 (R)
2014	Éire Óg	0–14	Rockchapel	0-06
2013	Grenagh	0–12	Aghabullogue	0-05
2012	Castletownbere	1–12	Éire Óg	0–13
2011	Kinsale	1-09	Castletownbere	0-08
2010	Macroom	1-09	Kildorrery	0–10
2009	Carrigaline	0–11	Cill Na Martra	0-08
2008	Valley Rovers	1–12	Kildorrery	3-04
2007	Grenagh	2–13	Carrigaline	0–13
2006	Béal Átha Ghaorthaidh	0-09, 0-05 (R)	Castletownbere	0-09, 0-04 (R)
2005	Carbery Rangers	1–13	Glanmire	2-05
2004	Nemo Rangers	3-06	Carbery Rangers	1–10
2003	Ilen Rovers	0–15	Carrigaline	0-07
2002	Nemo Rangers	2-09	Newmarket	0–10
2001	Newcestown	0–13	Nemo Rangers	0-06
2000	Youghal	1-09, 1-01 (R)	Nemo Rangers	2-06, 0-03 (R)
1999	Naomh Abán	1-08, 1-09 (R)	Castletownbere	2-05, 1-06 (R)
1998	St Michael's	1–11	St. Finbarr's	0-08
1997	Douglas	0-09, 0-09 (R)	Castletownbere	1-06, 1-03 (R)
1996	Clyda Rovers	0–16	Carrigaline	1-05
1995	Dohenys	0–11	Kilmurry	0-07
1994	Ballincollig	2-07	Clyda Rovers	2-04
1993	Bantry Blues	0–12	Ballincollig	0–10
1992	Mallow	1–13	Kilmurry	2-09
1991	Aghada	0-09	Ballincollig	0-08
1990	Macroom	2–10	Castletownbere	1-07
1989	Rockchapel	1–10, 0-09 (R)	Mallow	1–10, 0-04 (R)
1988	Kilshannig	2-09	Ballincollig	1-07
1987	Glanmire	3-05	Fermoy	0-06
1986	Castletownbere	1-09	Kilshannig	0-08
1985	O'Donovan Rossa	3–11	Glanmire	0-08
1984	Midleton	2–11	O'Donovan Rossa	1–12
1983	Passage West	0-07, 1-06 (R)	O'Donovan Rossa	0-07, 0-07 (R)
1982	Macroom	1–12	Bandon	1-08
1981	Kildorrery	0–10	Glanmire	0-08
1980	Nemo Rangers	2-06	Midleton	1-04
1979	Adrigole	2-09	Kildorrery	1-06
1978	Castlehaven	0-08	St. Finbarr's	0-03
1977	Naomh Abán	1-08	Castlehaven	1-03
1976	Glanworth	1–10	Naomh Abán	2-06
1975	Bantry Blues	0-09	Naomh Abán	0-07
1974	Bishopstown	1–10	Newcestown	1-06
1973	Canovee	2–11	Glanworth	0-06
1972	Dohenys	4–10	Glanworth	1-07
1971	Newcestown	2–11	St. Finbarr's	3-02
1970	St. Finbarr's	1-08, 3-06 (R)	Youghal	1-08, 1-07 (R)
1969	St Michael's	5-08	Dohenys	1-03
1968	Cobh	1–12	St. Vincent's	1-06
1967	Urhan	2–15	Millstreet	2-06
1966	Na Piarsaigh	1-08	St. Vincent's	2-04
1965	Mitchelstown	2-08	St. Vincent's	1-05
1939–1964	No Championship			
1938	Bantry Blues	1-01	Dohenys	0-02
1937	St. Nicholas	3-05, 3-03 (R)	Bantry Blues	3-02, 1-02 (R)
1936	Bantry Blues	2-03	Dohenys	1-02
1935	Dromtarriffe	1-07	St. Columb's, Douglas	0-02
1934	Bantry Blues	1-01	St. Nicholas	0-03
1933	Kilmurry	2-03	Bantry Blues	0-06
1932	Fermoy	2-04	Kilmurry	0-01
1931	Clonakilty	3-06	Dromtarriffe	0-02
1930	St. Finbarr's	2-03	Dromtarriffe	1-01
1929	Mitchelstown	1-03	Owenabue	0-02
1928	Nemo Rangers	2-03	Kilmurry	0-01
1927	Duhallow United *		Fermoy	
1926	Buttevant	0-02	Kinsale	0-00
1925	Mitchelstown	3-04	Kilmurry	1-00
1924	O'Donovan Rossa	1-04	Mallow	0-00
1923	Shamrocks	1-01	Dohenys	0-00
1922	Not completed			
1921	Not played			
1920	Unfinished			
1919	Nils	0-07	Macroom	0-00
1918	Millstreet	0-02	Knockavilla	0-00
1917	St. Nicholas	7-07	Fermoy	0-00
1916	Cobh	0-02, 5-03 (R)	Macroom	0-02, 2-01 (R)
1915	Fermoy	1-02	Kinsale	0-00
1914	Millstreet	1-03	O'Donovan Rossa	0-00
1913	Clonakilty	2-01	O'Brien's	1-00
1912	Bantry Blues	0-01	CYMS	0-00
1911	Mitchelstown	2-05	William O'Brien's	0-00
1910	Kanturk	3-04	CYMS	0-01
1909	Cobh	0-04, 5-13 (R)	CYMS	0-04, 0-04 (R)

- 1927 Nemo Rangers and Kilmurry were disqualified after meeting in the other semi-final

== Roll of Honour ==
=== By club ===
#	Team	Titles	Runners-up	Championships won	Championships runner-up
1	Bantry Blues	6	2	1912, 1934, 1936, 1938, 1975, 1993	1933, 1937
2	Mitchelstown	4	4	1911, 1925, 1929, 1965	2017, 2020, 2021, 2023
2	Nemo Rangers	4	2	1928, 1980, 2002, 2004	2000, 2001
4	Fermoy	3	3	1915, 1932, 2015	1917, 1927, 1987
4	Macroom	3	2	1982, 1990, 2010	1916, 1919
4	Cobh	3	0	1909, 1916, 1968	—
7	Castletownbere	2	5	1986, 2012	1990, 1997, 1999, 2006, 2011
7	Dohenys	2	4	1972, 1995	1923, 1936, 1938, 1969
7	O'Donovan Rossa	2	3	1924, 1985	1914, 1983, 1984
7	St Finbarr's	2	3	1930, 1970	1971, 1978, 1998
7	Glanmire	2	3	1987, 2024	1981, 1985, 2005
7	Naomh Abán	2	2	1977, 1999	1975, 1976
7	Rockchapel	2	2	1989, 2020	2014, 2016
7	Millstreet	2	1	1914, 1918	1967
7	St. Nicholas'	2	1	1917, 1937	1934
7	Newcestown	2	1	1971, 2001	1974
7	Kilshannig	2	1	1988, 2022	1986
7	Clonakilty	2	0	1913, 1931	—
7	St Michael's	2	0	1969, 1998	—
7	Grenagh	2	0	2007, 2013	—
7	Kanturk	2	0	1910, 2017	—
20	Kilmurry	1	5	1933	1925, 1928, 1932, 1992, 1995
20	Kildorrery	1	3	1981	1979, 2008, 2010
20	Ballincollig	1	3	1994	1988, 1991, 1993
20	Carrigaline	1	3	2009	1996, 2003, 2007
20	Aghabullogue	1	3	2023	2013, 2018, 2022
20	Dromtarriffe	1	2	1935	1930, 1931
20	Glanworth	1	2	1976	1972, 1973
20	Mallow	1	2	1992	1924, 1989
20	Kinsale	1	2	2011	1915, 1926
20	Castlehaven	1	1	1978	1977
20	Midleton	1	1	1984	1980
20	Clyda Rovers	1	1	1996	1994
20	Youghal	1	1	2000	1970
20	Carbery Rangers	1	1	2005	2004
20	Éire Óg	1	1	2014	2012
20	Bandon	1	1	2016	1982
20	Cill Na Martra	1	1	2018	2009
20	Nils	1	0	1919	—
20	Shamrocks	1	0	1923	—
20	Buttevant	1	0	1926	—
20	Duhallow United	1	0	1927	—
20	Na Piarsaigh	1	0	1966	—
20	Urhan	1	0	1967	—
20	Canovee	1	0	1973	—
20	Bishopstown	1	0	1974	—
20	Adrigole	1	0	1979	—
20	Passage West	1	0	1983	—
20	Aghada	1	0	1991	—
20	Douglas	1	0	1997	—
20	Ilen Rovers	1	0	2003	—
20	Béal Átha'n Ghaorthaidh	1	0	2006	—
20	Valley Rovers	1	0	2008	—
20	Knocknagree	1	0	2019	—
20	Iveleary	1	0	2021	—
56	CYMS	0	3	—	1909, 1910, 1912
56	St Vincent's	0	3	—	1965, 1966, 1968
56	William O'Brien's	0	1	—	1911
56	O'Brien's	0	1	—	1913
56	Knockavilla	0	1	—	1918
56	Owenabue	0	1	—	1929
56	St. Columb's, Douglas	0	1	—	1935
56	Newmarket	0	1	—	2002
56	Mayfield	0	1	—	2015
56	Gabriel Rangers	0	1	—	2019
56	Boherbue	0	1	—	2024

=== By division ===
#	Division	Titles	Runners-Up	Total	Most recent win
1	Carbery	18	14	32	2016
2	Muskerry	15	17	32	2023
2	Avondhu	15	16	31	2022
4	Seandún	14	16	30	2004
5	Duhallow	9	7	16	2020
6	Imokilly	8	5	13	2024
7	Carrigdhoun	4	7	11	2011
8	Beara	4	5	9	2012

== See also ==
- Cork Intermediate A Hurling Championship
