= Dromtarriffe GAA =

Gaelic games club in County Cork, Ireland

Dromtarriffe
- Drom Tairbh
- Founded: 1885
- County: Cork
- Nickname: Drom
- Colours
- Grounds: Dromtarriffe GAA Grounds

Playing kits
Standard colours

Senior Club Championships
	All Ireland	Munster champions	Cork champions
Football:	0	0	1

Dromtarriffe GAA is a Gaelic Athletic Association club based in the north-west of County Cork, Ireland. The club is affiliated to the Duhallow division of Cork GAA. Their hurling team currently competes in the Duhallow Junior A Hurling Championship and their football team currently competes in the Cork Intermediate A Football Championship.

== History ==
Dromtarriffe GAA club was originally formed in 1885. It is named for the parish and townland of Dromtarriffe (or Dromtarriff or Dromtariffe). The parish is centred on the small village of Dromagh.

The club has historically been concerned with the game of Gaelic football, and won the Cork Senior Football Championship in 1893. It also fields teams in hurling competitions.

== Football ==
Dromtarriffe is one of the few clubs within Duhallow to have won the Cork Senior Football Championship. The club fields teams in the Duhallow Junior A Football Championship, and their successes have included a win in the Duhallow 2005 final against Ballydesmond. They then lost to Erin's Own in the 2005 Cork Junior Football Championship. Their latest successes include winning the Junior A county championship in 2018, defeating Kilmacabea 2-9 to 2-8. Two late goals from Darren O'Connor turned the tide after being down five points. Dromtarriffe also have a Ladies' Gaelic football team in the club.

== Hurling ==
Dromtarriffe also fields hurling teams, and competes at Junior A Hurling level. Dromtarriffe's minor hurlers made the Cork Minor C Hurling Championship final in 2009 but were defeated by Cobh. In 2016, Dromtarriffe's hurlers won the Cork Junior B Interdivisional Championship after a replay against Sarsfields GAA in Páirc Uí Rinn. A week later, the clubs under 21 hurlers won their first ever Duhallow Under 21 'A' Hurling Championship against Robert Emmets. They won the Duhallow Junior A championship for the first time ever in 2018 defeating Newmarket. They followed up their win in 2018 with a win against Kilbrin by 11 points with the game finishing 0-30 to 2-11. They had success again in 2021 beating Millstreet 2-18 to 1-14 and made it to the county final but lost to a Ballygiblin side by 2-18 to 0-18 points.

== Honours ==
- Cork Premier Senior Football Championship (1): 1893
- Cork Intermediate A Football Championship (1): 1935
- Cork Junior A Football Championship (4): 1934, 1938, 1959, 2018
- Cork Junior B Inter-Divisional Hurling Championship (1): 2016
- Duhallow Hurling Cup (1): 2021
- Duhallow Junior A Football Championship (14): 1933, 1934, 1938, 1943, 1945, 1946, 1951, 1953, 1956, 1959, 1973, 1974, 1995, 2005
- Duhallow Junior A Hurling Championship (5): 2018, 2020, 2021, 2022, 2024
- Duhallow Junior B Hurling Championship (5): 1986, 1987, 2014, 2015, 2016
- North Cork Junior A Football Championship (2) 1930, 1932
- Cork Under-21 C Football Championship (1): 2017

== Notable players ==
- Conor O'Callaghan
- Pat O'Callaghan
- Frank Corrigan (dual player)
