= 1909 Cork Intermediate Football Championship =

Gaelic football competition

- Champions: Cobh (1st title)
- Runners-up: C.Y.M.S.

The 1909 Cork Intermediate Football Championship was the inaugural staging of the Cork Intermediate Football Championship since its establishment by the Cork County Board.

The final was played on 5 December 1909 at the Athletic Grounds in Cork, between Cobh and C.Y.M.S., in what was their first ever meeting in the final. Cobh won the match by 5–13 to 0–04 to claim their first ever championship title.

== Results ==
=== Final ===
5 December 1909 Final	Cobh	5-13 - 0-04	C.Y.M.S.	Cork Athletic Grounds
				Referee: F Searles
