= Kildorrery GAA =

Gaelic games club in County Cork, Ireland

- CLG Cill Dairbhre
- Founded: 1949
- County: Cork
- Colours: White and blue

Playing kits
Standard colours

Kildorrery GAA is a Gaelic Athletic Association based in the parish of Kildorrery, County Cork, Ireland. The club fields teams in competitions organized by the Cork GAA county board and the Avondhu GAA divisional board. The club fields teams in both hurling and Gaelic football.

== Achievements ==
- Munster Junior Club Hurling Championship Winners (1) 2012
- Cork Intermediate Football Championship Winners (1) 1981
- Cork Intermediate A Football Championship Runner-Up 2008, 2010
- Cork Intermediate Hurling Championship Runners-Up 2016
- Cork Junior Football Championship Winners (1) 1978 Runners-Up 2007
- Cork Junior Hurling Championship Winners (1) 2012 Runner-Up 1972
- Cork Minor A Football Championship Runner-Up 2000
- Cork Minor B Football Championship Runner-Up 1997
- Cork Under-21 B Football Championship Runner-Up 2012
- North Cork Junior A Hurling Championship Winners (9) 1962, 1963, 1969, 1972, 1973, 1977, 1984, 1988, 2012 Runners-Up 1961, 1968, 1975, 1978, 2011
- North Cork Junior A Football Championship Winners (4) 1978, 1990, 1994, 2007 Runners-Up 1974, 1975, 1986, 1989,

== External sources ==
Kildorrery GAA website
