= 2017–18 All-Ireland Junior Club Football Championship =

- Dates: 7 October 2017 – 3 February 2018
- Teams: 32
- Sponsor: Allied Irish Bank
- Champions: Knocknagree (1st title); Matthew Dilworth (captain); John Fintan Daly (manager)
- Runners-up: Multyfarnham; David Wallace (captain); Louis Ennis (manager)

Tournament statistics
- Matches played: 31
- Goals scored: 85 (2.74 per match)
- Points scored: 620 (20 per match)
- Top scorer(s): Fintan O'Connor (3-14)

Provincial Champions
- Munster: Knocknagree
- Leinster: Multyfarnham
- Ulster: Naomh Colmcille
- Connacht: Lahardane McHales

The 2017–18 All-Ireland Junior Club Football Championship was the 17th staging of the All-Ireland Junior Club Football Championship since its establishment by the Gaelic Athletic Association. The championship ran from 7 October 2017 to 3 February 2018.

The All-Ireland final was played on 3 February 2018 at Croke Park in Dublin, between Knocknagree and Multyfarnham. Knocknagree won the match by 3-13 to 3-09 to claim their first ever championship title.

== Connacht Junior Club Football Championship ==
=== Connacht semi-finals ===
4 November 2017 Semi-final	Ballymote (Sligo)	2-11 - 0-08	Kilglass Gaels (Roscommon)	Dr Hyde Park
	M Irwin 1-1, N Colsh 0-4, G Brennan 1-0, P Lyons 0-3, S Ross 0-2, J Hever 0-1.	Report	C mcHugh 0-2, B Conroy 0-2, P Bolger 0-2, T Tully 0-1, T Cox 0-1.

5 November 2017 Semi-final	Lahardane McHales (Mayo)	5-13 - 0-11	St Gabriel's (Galway)	MacHale Park
	A Leonard 2-9, K Loftus 1-0, C Reilly 1-0, C Blake-Naish 1-0, A Murphy 0-2, M Coleman 0-1, P Coleman 0-1.		C Donnellan 0-4, J Egan 0-3, G Donnellan 0-1, D Malone 0-1, L O'Connor 0-1, E Malone 0-1.

=== Connacht final ===
19 November 2017 Final	Lahardane McHales (Mayo)	1-15 - 3-05	Ballymote (Sligo)	MacHale Park
	A Leonard 0-5 (3f); G Naughton 1-1; S Loftus 0-3 (1f); T Dever, C Reilly 0-2 each; J Maughan, P Coleman 0-1 each.	Report	J Heever, N Brennan, A Leonard (og) 1-0 each; P Lyons 0-3 (3f); N Cosh (f), S Ross 0-1 each

== Leinster Junior Club Football Championship ==
=== Leinster first round ===
7 October 2017 First round	Crossabeg–Ballymurn (Wexford)	0-15 - 2-05	Ballon (Carlow)	O'Kennedy Park
	C O'Rourke (0-6, 4 frees), S Kelly (0-3, 2 frees), P Foley (0-3); C Shovlin (0-1), P Devereux (0-1), M O'Connor (0-1).	Report	L Brennan (1-2), A Kelly (1-1, 0-1 free), F Fanning (0-1 free), M O'Leary (0-1 free).

7 October 2017 First round	Laragh (Wicklow)	1-09 - 1-08	Kilcavan (Laois)	Joule Park
	J Nolan 0-5, M Miley 1-0, K Lawler 0-3, D Hanlon 0-1.		J Maher 1-0, R Gorry 0-2, S Mangan 0-1, M Bermingham 0-1, M Dunne 0-1, G Treacy 0-1, O Dixon 0-1, M Tarpey 0-1.

7 October 2017 First round	Erin Rovers (Offaly)	0-20 - 2-09	Seán Connollys (Longford)	Pullough Grounds
	C Lynam 0-7, N Poland 0-4 (3f), B Buckley 0-2; T Spain 0-2; R Delaney 0-1 (f), D Spain 0-1, D Cooney 0-1, D Kelly 0-1 (penalty), G Russo 0-1.	Report	D Reynolds 1-4 (2f), G Masterson 1-0 (penalty), S Lynch 0-3 (2f), P O'Neill (0-1), P McDonnell (0-1).

7 October 2017 First round	Conahy Shamrocks (Kilkenny)	1-04 - 3-12	Glen Emmets (Louth)	Polo Grounds
	J Muldowney 1-0, D Buggy 0-1, G Dunne 0-1, T Phelan 0-1, P Delaney 0-1.	Report	D Grimes (1-1), J Butler (0-4, one free and one '45), R Grufferty (0-4, one free), M Garvey (1-0); K O'Neill (1-0), A Mooney (0-1); K Boylan (0-1), I Cusack (0-1).

=== Leinster quarter-finals ===
21 October 2017 Quarter-final	Crossabeg–Ballymurn (Wexford)	1-12 - 2-01	Man-O-War (Dublin)	St Patrick's Park
	C O'Rourke 1-4, S Kelly 0-2, S Carroll 0-1, B Eviston 0-1, M O'Connor 0-1, P Devereux 0-1, P Foley 0-1, M Redmond 0-1.	Report	W Moore 1-1, C Garvey 1-0.

21 October 2017 Quarter-final	Glen Emmets (Louth)	0-11 - 0-14	Meath Hill (Meath)	Drogheda Park
	J Butler 0-4; R Grufferty 0-3, D Grimes 0-2, A Mooney 0-2.	Report

21 October 2017 Quarter-final	Laragh (Wicklow)	0-05 - 1-10	Multyfarnham (Westmeath)	Joule Park
	J Nolan 0-2 (2f), P Merrigan 0-1, M Miley 0-1, A Lynham 0-1.	Report	A McGivney 1-1, D Wallace 0-3, M Brady 0-2 (2f), C Madden 0-1, A Loughrey 0-1, J Green 0-1, D Loughrey 0-1, R Wallace 0-1 (45).

28 October 2017 Quarter-final	Erin Rovers (Offaly)	1-16 - 0-13; AET	Ballymore Eustace (Kildare)	Pullough Grounds
	R Delaney 0-6, T Spain 1-0, D Cooney 0-3, N Poland 0-3, G Russo 0-3, D Kelly 0-1.	Report	E Kavanagh 0-3, M Slevin 0-2, N Murphy 0-2, G Fennell 0-2, C Halpin Graham 0-2, S Barrett 0-1, S Dwyer 0-1.

=== Leinster semi-finals ===
4 November 2017 Semi-final	Crossabeg–Ballymurn (Wexford)	0-09 - 1-07	Multyfarnham (Westmeath)	Bellefield Grounds
	C O'Rourke (0-6, 5 frees), B Eviston (0-2), C Devereux (0-1).	Report	M Brady (0-4, 3 frees), M Reynolds (1-0), D Loughrey (0-2 frees); D Wallace (0-1).

4 November 2017 Semi-final	Erin Rovers (Offaly)	4-08 - 2-10	Meath Hill (Meath)	Pullough Grounds
	C Lynam 3-1, N Poland 1-4, R Delaney 0-1, T Spain 0-1, D Cooney 0-1.	Report	I Malone 1-3, P McGrath 0-4, T Rooney 1-0, J Yorke 0-1, J Mooney 0-1 J Ginnitty 0-1.

=== Leinster final ===
18 November 2017 Final	Multyfarnham (Westmeath)	2-06 - 0-05	Erin Rovers (Offaly)	Cusack Park
	M Brady 2-3 (0-1f); D Loughrey (f), I McGovern, D Wallace 0-1 each.	Report	R Delaney 0-2 (2fs); R Fox, T Spain, C Lynam 0-1 each.

== Munster Junior Club Football Championship ==
=== Munster quarter-finals ===
5 November 2017 Quarter-final	Knocknagree (Cork)	5-15 - 0-08	Knockavilla–Donaskeigh Kickhams (Tipperary)	Mallow
	F O’Connor (1-2), E McSweeney (0-5, 0-4F), P Collins (1-0), G O’Connor (1-0); C White (1-0); M Dilworth (0-3), JF Daly (0-2), K Daly (0-1), D Moynihan (0-1); D Cooper (0-1).	Report	D Butler (0-2F), G Browne (0-2), S Morrissey (0-2), B Ryan (0-1), G McCormack (0-1).

5 November 2017 Quarter-final	Naomh Eoin (Clare)	0-10 - 0-14	Dromid Pearses (Kerry)	Páirc Eoin
	N Bonfil 0-5, G Lynch 0-1, P Foley 0-1, O Lynch 0-1, C Downes 0-1, D Lynch 0-1.		N O'Shea 0-5, T Curran 0-3, C Farley 0-2, AS O'Sullivan 0-1, Graham O'Sullivan 0-1, D O'Donoghue 0-1, PJ O'Sullivan 0-1.

=== Munster semi-finals ===
18 November 2017 Semi-final	Dromid Pearses (Kerry)	2-17 - 3-10; AET	Galtee Gaels (Limerick)	Páirc an Phiarsaigh
	Graham O’Sullivan (1-5), C Farley (1-3, 1f), N Ó Sé (0-4), T Curran (0-2, 2f), Gearóid O’Sullivan, D O’Donoghue and P O’Sullivan (0-1 each)	Report	A Condon (1-2), M O’Sullivan and W Walsh (1-0 each), B Childs (3f) and S Casey (0-3 each) and S McGrath (0-2).

19 November 2017 Semi-final	Knocknagree (Cork)	2-16 - 1-07	Sliabh gCua–St Mary's (Waterford)	Mallow
	F O’Connor 1-4 (two frees); P O’Connor 1-0; JF Daly, E McSweeney (two frees), M Dilworth 0-3 each; D Cooper 0-2; J Dennehy 0-1.	Report	J Sheehan 1-5 (1-0 pen; four frees); E Kearns, A Fitzpatrick 0-1 each.

=== Munster final ===
3 December 2017 Final	Knocknagree (Cork)	1-17 - 2-11	Dromid Pearses (Kerry)	Mallow
	A O’Connor (1-7, 0-6 frees), E McSweeney and F O’Connor (0-3 each), M Dilworth (0-2), M Mahoney and J F Daly (0-1 each).	Report	N O’Shea (0-5, 0-2 frees), G Jackie O’Sullivan and C Farley (0-1 free) (1-1 each), K Farley (0-2), A Shine O’Sullivan and S O’Connor (0-1 each).

== Ulster Junior Club Football Championship ==
=== Ulster preliminary round ===
15 October 2017 First round	Ballymachugh (Cavan)	0-14 - 0-09	Sarsfields (Antrim)	Kingspan Breffni
	J Kiernan 0-7 (0-4fs), A Donohoe 0-2 (0-1f); Dillon Kiernan 0-2; J Smith 0-1; B Kiernan 0-1, P Galligan (0-1).	Report	K McKernan 0-4 (0-4fs), C Glenholmes 0-3, G Lennon 0-2.

=== Ulster quarter-finals ===
28 October 2017 Quarter-final	Naomh Colmcille (Donegal)	1-08 - 0-07	Ballymachugh (Cavan)	MacCumhaill Park
	M Crossan 0-4, J Fullerton 1-0, D Clarke 0-2, M Lynch 0-1, R McErlean 0-1.	Report	B Kiernan 0-5, A Donohoe 0-2.

29 October 2017 Quarter-final	Ballyhegan Davitts (Armagh)	0-10 - 4-09	Doire Trasna (Derry)	Athletic Grounds
	J McKeever 0-5, C McKeever 0-3, M Hughes 0-1, E Reynolds 0-1.	Report	C O'Connell 2-2, S McNaught 1-2, D Starrett 1-1, C Murray 0-3, C Carlin 0-1.

29 October 2017 Quarter-final	Dundrum (Down)	2-06 - 2-13	Belnaleck Art McMurroughs (Fermanagh)	Páirc Esler
	C Rice 1-1, E King 1-0, P Comiskey 0-2, C Walsh 0-2, C Venney 0-1.	Report	C McBrien 0-6, D McGurn 1-1, P Monaghan 1-0, D Lewsley 0-2, B Owens 0-2, J Heavey 0-2.

29 October 2017 Quarter-final	Tattyreagh St Patrick's (Tyrone)	3-14 - 2-12	Currin (Monaghan)	Healy Park
	J Darcy 0-8, J McDonagh 1-1, B Armstrong 1-1, E Murray 1-0, G Mimnagh 0-2, J Harkin 0-2.	Report	J McCarron 0-7, S Smyth 1-2, D Clerin 1-0, N McEntee 0-2, E McCaffrey 0-1.

=== Ulster semi-finals ===
12 November 2017 Semi-final	Belnaleck Art McMurroughs (Fermanagh)	1-07 - 1-06	Doire Trasna (Derry)	St Tiernach's Park
	C McBrien 1-2, J Owens 0-1, S Lewsley 0-1, D Lewsley 0-1, J Heavey 0-1, J Owens 0-1.		C Doherty 1-1, M McNaught 0-3, D Starrett 0-2.

18 November 2017 Semi-final	Naomh Colmcille (Donegal)	2-07 - 1-09	Tattyreagh St Patrick's (Tyrone)	Celtic Park
	W Gillespie (1-2, 2f), R McErlean (1-2), D Clarke (0-2, 1f); M Lynch (0-1, f).	Report	B Armstrong (1-1), J Darcy (0-4, 3f), J Harkin (0-2, 1f), G Mimnagh (0-1), R Porter (0-1).

=== Ulster final ===
25 November 2017 Final	Naomh Colmcille (Donegal)	1-09 - 0-06	Belnaleck Art McMurroughs (Fermanagh)	Celtic Park
	M Crossan (1-0), W Gillespie (0-3, 1f), M Lynch (0-3, 1'45), D Clarke (0-3, 1f).	Report	J Heavey (0-3, 2f), C McBrien (0-2), C McAuley (0-1).

== All-Britain Club Football Championship ==
=== Britain quarter-finals ===
22 October 2017 Quarter-final	Sean McDermotts (Warwickshire)	2-12 - 1-09	Oisín (Lancashire)	Páirc na hÉireann

22 October 2017 Quarter-final	Thomas McCurtains (London)	W - L	Hugh O'Neills (Yorkshire)	Páirc na hÉireann

22 October 2017 Quarter-final	Dunedin Connollys (Scotland)	W - L	St Nicholas (Gloucestershire)	Páirc Beeston

=== Britain semi-finals ===
Semi-final	Dunedin Connollys (Scotland)	1-14 - 0-04	St Colmcilles (Hertfordshire)	Páirc na hÉireann

5 November 2017 Semi-final	Sean McDermotts (Warwickshire)	2-11 - 1-12	Thomas McCurtains (London)	McGovern Park

=== Britain final ===
19 November 2017 Final	Dunedin Connollys (Scotland)	1-17 - 1-12	Sean McDermotts (Warwickshire)	Páirc Beeston

== All-Ireland Junior Club Football Championship ==
=== All-Ireland quarter-final ===
9 December 2017 Quarter-final	Dunedin Connollys (Scotland)	2-06 - 1-10	Naomh Colmcille (Donegal)	Granton Road
	S Malee 1-3 (1-0 pen, 3f), S Mulvihill 1-0, F Molloy 0-2, D Keane 0-1f.	Report	R McErlean 1-2, D Clarke and W Gillespie 0-3 (2f) each, J Fullerton and G Curran 0-1 each.

=== All-Ireland semi-finals ===
28 January 2018 Semi-final	Lahardane McHales (Mayo)	2-09 - 1-14	Multyfarnham (Westmeath)	Dr. Hyde Park
	J Maughan 1-1, C Reilly 1-0, A Murphy (1f) and A Leonard 0-3 each (2f), T Dever and M Noone 0-1 each.	Report	D Loughrey 0-5 (3f), E Feerick (1-0), M, Brady 0-2, R Wallace, B McLoughlin, A McGivney, C Madden, E McGovern, D Wallace and M Fallon 0-1 each.

28 January 2018 Semi-final	Knocknagree (Cork)	2-09 - 0-07	Naomh Colmcille (Donegal)	TEG Cusack Park
	J Dennehy 1-0, J F Daly 1-0, E McSweeney 0-3, F O’Connor 0-2, A O’Connor 0-2, D Moynihan, M Dilworth 0-1 each.	Report	W Gillesepie 0-4f, M Crossan 0-2, D Clarke 0-1f.

=== All-Ireland final ===
3 February 2018 Final	Knocknagree (Cork)	3-13 - 3-09	Multyfarnham (Westmeath)	Croke Park
	F O'Connor 1-3, M Mahoney 1-0, P Doyle 1-0 (45), JF Daly 0-3, E McSweeney 0-2, A O'Connor 0-2, P Collins 0-1, J Dennehy 0-1, M Dilworth 0-1.	Report	M Fallon 2-0, M Brady 0-6 (0-4f), D Wallace 1-0, K Daly 0-1 (knocknagree own point), E Feerick 0-1, R Wallace (0-1f) 0-1.

== Championship statistics ==
=== Top scorers ===
Rank	Player	Club	Tally	Total	Matches	Average
1	Fintan O'Connor	Knocknagree	3-14	23	5	4.60
2	Adrian Leonard	Lahardane McHales	2-17	23	3	7.66
3	Max Brady	Multyfarnham	2-15	21	4	5.25
4	Cormac O'Rourke	Multyfarnham	1-16	19	3	6.33
5	Conor Lynam	Erin Rovers	3-09	18	4	4.50
