= 2025 Cork Senior A Football Championship =

Annual Gaelic football competition season

- Dates: 25 July - 26 October 2025
- Teams: 12
- Sponsor: McCarthy Insurance Group
- Champions: Knocknagree (1st title); Anthony O'Connor (captain); John Fintan Daly (manager)
- Runners-up: Cill Na Martra; Dan Ó Duinnín (captain); Morgan O'Sullivan (manager)
- Relegated: Fermoy

Tournament statistics
- Matches played: 24
- Goals scored: 53 (2.21 per match)
- Points scored: 682 (28.42 per match)
- Top scorer(s): Anthony O'Connor (2-29)

The 2025 Cork Senior A Football Championship was the sixth staging of the Cork Senior A Football Championship since its establishment by the Cork County Board in 2020. The draw for the group stage placings took place on 10 December 2024. The competition ran from 25 July to 26 October 2025.

The final was played on 26 October 2025 at SuperValu Páirc Uí Chaoimh in Cork, between Knocknagree and Cill Na Martra, in what was their first ever meeting in the final. Knocknagree won the match by 2-17 to 0-17 to claim their first ever championship title.

Knocknagree's Anthony O'Connor was the championship's top scorer with 2-29.

== Team changes ==
=== To Championship ===
Relegated from the Cork Premier Senior Football Championship

- Éire Óg

Promoted from the Cork Premier Intermediate Football Championship

- Kilshannig

=== From Championship ===
Promoted to the Cork Premier Senior Football Championship

- Carrigaline

Relegated to the Cork Premier Intermediate Football Championship

- Kiskeam

== Group 1 ==
=== Group 1 table ===
Quarter-finalist

Team	Matches				Score			Pts
Team	Pld	W	D	L	For	Against	Diff	Pts
Éire Óg	3	2	0	1	49	43	6	4
Kanturk	3	1	1	1	46	41	5	3
Newmarket	3	1	1	1	49	54	-5	3
Kilshannig	3	1	0	2	47	53	-6	2

=== Group 1 results ===
25 July 2025 Round 1	Éire Óg	0-13 - 0-10	Kanturk	Castle Grounds
	B Hurley 0-4 (0-2f), D Foley, D Clifford (1 2pt), J Galvin 0-2 each, R O’Toole, J Murphy, C Kelly (0-1 45) 0-1 each.	Report	G Bucinskas 0-4 (0-1 f, 0-1 45), I Walsh 0-2 (0-1 f), C Walsh, P Walsh, T Walsh, B Healy 0-1 each.

26 July 2025 Round 1	Kilshannig	1-18 - 0-14	Newmarket	Fr Kelleher Park
	E O’Hanlon 0-5 (0-2 f), K Twomey 0-4, D O’Sullivan 0-3 (0-1 f), A O’Connell 1-0, K O’Hanlon 0-2 (1 tp), C O’Shea 0-2, M Murphy, J Twomey 0-1 each.	Report	H O’Connor 0-4 (0-1 tpf, 0-1 f), C Browne 0-3 (1 tp), C O’Keeffe 0-2 (0-1 f), B O’Connor 0-2, R O’Keeffe (45), A Browne, D O’Keeffe 0-1 each.

23 August 2025 Round 2	Newmarket	1-18 - 0-19	Éire Óg	Carrigadrohid Grounds
	C O’Keeffe 0-5, C Browne 1-1, D O’Keeffe (1 tp), R O’Keeffe 0-3 each, H O’Connor (1 f), A Browne (tp), B O’Connor 0-2 each.	Report	C O’Callaghan 0-3, D Foley, R O’Flynn, J Galvin (tp), J Murphy (1f), D Goulding (1f), E O’Shea 0-2 each, D Clifford, B Hurley (f), R O’Toole, C Clifford, 0-1 each.

24 August 2025 Round 2	Kanturk	3-13 - 2-08	Kilshannig	Dr Croke Park
	P Walsh 2-1 (1-0 penalty), G Bucinskas 0-6 (1 2ptf, 0-3 f), D O’Connell 1-1, I Walsh 0-2, M Healy, L O’Neill, C Walsh 0-1 each.	Report	J Twomey 1-1, C O’Shea 1-0, É O’Hanlon 0-3, K Twomey 0-2 (2ptf), D O’Sullivan (0-1 f), T Cunningham 0-1 each.

14 September 2025 Round 3	Kanturk	0-14 - 0-14	Newmarket	Banteer Sportsfield
	G Bucinskas 0-4 (tpf, 1f), I Walsh 0-4 (0-1f), C Walsh 0-3 (tp), P Walsh, K Fitzpatrick, A Walsh 0-1 each.	Report	H O’Connor 0-6(2tpf), C O’Keeffe 0-3 (0-1f), C Browne 0-2, B O’Connor, R O’Keeffe, D Hannon 0-1 each.

14 September 2025 Round 3	Éire Óg	1-14 - 0-12	Kilshannig	Páirc Eoin Mhic Chárthaigh
	C Kelly (0-5, 1f, 2 2p), D Foley 1-0, B Hurley 0-3 (3f), D Clifford 0-3 (1 2p), E O’Shea 0-2, C Clifford 0-1.	Report	E O’Hanlon 0-4 (2f), D O’Sullivan 0-3 (1f), K Twomey (0-2, 1 2p), T Cunningham 0-2, S Murphy 0-1.

== Group 2 ==
=== Group 2 table ===
Semi-finalist Quarter-finalist Relegation playoff

Team	Matches				Score			Pts
Team	Pld	W	D	L	For	Against	Diff	Pts
Cill Na Martra	3	2	1	0	61	48	13	5
Knocknagree	3	2	1	0	66	54	12	5
Clyda Rovers	3	1	0	2	52	55	-3	2
Fermoy	3	0	0	3	38	60	-22	0

=== Group 2 results ===
26 July 2025 Round 1	Clyda Rovers	3-11 - 1-11	Fermoy	Dr Mannix Sportsfield
	C Corbett 1-4, E Walsh 1-2, K Graham 1-0, D Walsh, P O’Grady 0-2 each, D Cooney 0-1.	Report	D Lardner 0-5 (3f), G O’Callaghan 1-0, J Hutchings, P de Róiste, S Ahern, J Morrisson, A Ahern, J Molloy 0-1 each.

27 July 2025 Round 1	Cill Na Martra	2-17 - 3-14	Knocknagree	Clondrohid Grounds
	C Ó Duinnín 1-6 (1 2pt), S Ó Forréidh 0-3 (1 2pt), A Ó Cuana 1-0, D Ó Duinnín, J Mac Cárthaigh (2ptf), D Ó Conaill 0-2 each, D Ó hUrdail (0-1 f), A Ó Duinnín 0-1 each.	Report	Denis R O’Connor, A O’Connor (0-3 f) 0-4 each, N O’Connor 1-1, K Cronin, G O’Connor 1-0 each, M McSweeney, P Doyle (1 2ptf) 0-2 each, G Looney 0-1 each.

22 August 2025 Round 2	Fermoy	1-10 - 1-20	Cill na Martra	Éire Óg Grounds
	G O’Callaghan 1-2, D Lardner 0-4 (2 tp), A Aherne 0-2 (1 tp), G Lardner, D Daly 0-1 each.	Report	J MacCarthaigh 0-7 (0-3 f, 1 tp), D Ó hUrdail 0-5 (1 tp), E Ó Connail 1-0, D Ó Duinnin 0-4, M Ó Deasuna (0-1 pen), C Ó Meachair, C Ó Connail, C Ó Duinnin 0-1 each.

24 August 2025 Round 2	Knocknagree	3-17 - 2-14	Clyda Rovers	Priory Park
	A O’Connor 1-7 (2 tp, 0-2 f), G Looney 1-1, M McSweeney (1 tp), N O’Connor 0-3 each, D O’Mahony 1-0, Denis R O’Connor, P Doyle (45), K Cronin 0-1 each.	Report	C Corbett 1-9 (0-5 f, 1 tpf), E Walsh 0-4 (1 tp), C Walsh 1-0, B Nyhan 0-1.

14 September 2025 Round 3	Knocknagree	1-14 - 2-05	Fermoy	Fr Con Buckley Park
	E McSweeney 1-2 (1 2pt), A O’Connor 0-5 (1 2pt), D O’Connor, M McSweeney (1 2pt), N O’Leary 0-2 each, G Looney 0-1.	Report	B Twomey 0-4 f (1 2pt f, 0-2 f), D Lardner 1-1 (0-1 f), G O’Callaghan 1-0.

14 September 2025 Round 3	Cill Na Martra	0-15 - 0-12	Clyda Rovers	Páirc Uí Rinn
	J Mac Carthaigh 0-7 (3 2pt, 0-1 f), D O hUirdall 0-5 (0-1 f), D O Conaill, C O Meachair, C Duinnin 0-1 each.	Report	C Corbett 0-4 (1 2pt, 0-2 f), C O’Sullivan 0-4, E Walsh 0-3 (1 2pt, 0-1 f), B Nyhan 0-1.

== Group 3 ==
=== Group 3 table ===
Semi-finalist Quarter-finalist Relegation playoff

Team	Matches				Score			Pts
Team	Pld	W	D	L	For	Against	Diff	Pts
Béal Átha'n Ghaorth.	3	2	1	0	53	47	6	5
Bishopstown	3	2	0	1	52	50	2	4
Dohenys	3	1	0	2	49	49	0	2
O'Donovan Rossa	3	0	1	2	42	50	-8	1

=== Group 3 results ===
26 July 2025 Round 1	Bishopstown	1-15 - 1-13	Dohenys	St Mary's Park
	C Dunne 0-5 (1 2pt, 0-3 f), D O’Connor (1 2pt), S Collins 0-4 each, O Foley 1-1, P Casey 0-1.	Report	D Herlihy 1-4 (1 2pt, 1-0 pen), M Buckley 0-3 (0-2 f), G Farr 0-2 (0-2 f), A O’Donovan, S Barry, S Daly (1 45) and K White 0-1 each.

27 July 2025 Round 1	Béal Átha'n Ghaorthaidh	0-15 - 1-12	O'Donovan Rossa	Wolfe Tone Park
	D Mac Thomáis 0-7 (0-3 f), C Ó Loinsigh 0-2, D Ó Coill (45), S Ó Muimhneacháin, S Ó Luasa, S Ó Tuama, D Ó Ceallacháin, D Seartan 0-1 each.	Report	E Connolly 1-2, K Davis (0-3 f), N Daly 0-3 each, R Byrne 0-2, K Hurley, T Hegarty 0-1 each.

23 August 2025 Round 2	Dohenys	1-14 - 2-14	Béal Átha'n Ghaorthaidh	Inchigeelagh Grounds
	K White 0-4 f, S Daly 0-3 (1 2ptf, 0-1 45), E Lavers 1-0, F Herlihy, R Coakley 0-2 each, S Barry, K McCarthy, J Collins 0-1 each.	Report	D Mac Thomáis 1-3 (0-1 f), C Ó Loingsigh 0-3 (1 2pt), S Ó Luasa 1-0, D Seartan, S Ó Tuama (1 2pt), B Seartan (0-1 f) 0-2 each, N Ó Laoire, S Ó Muineacháin 0-1 each.

24 August 2025 Round 2	O'Donovan Rossa	1-13 - 2-13	Bishopstown	Henry Ford Park
	K Davis (0-7, 2tpf, 0-3f), D Hourihane Snr (1-0, pen), B Crowley (0-2, 1tp), K Hurley, T Hegarty, D Shannon and E Connolly (0-1 each).	Report	G Holland (0-6, 2tp), O Foley (1-1), B Cahill (0-4, 1tp), S Collins (1-0), K McFadden and B Clifford (0-1 each).

14 September 2025 Round 3	Bishopstown	1-12 - 3-09	Béal Átha'n Ghaorthaidh	Coachford Sportsfield
	J Murphy 1-0, C Dunne 0-4 (2f), D O’Connor (1 2 pointer), G Holland 0-2 each, L Hogan, S Collins, K Murphy, O Foley 0-1 each.	Report	D Seartan 1-2 (1-0 pen), B Seartan 1-1, N Ó Laoire 1-0, C Ó Loingsigh, D MacThomáis 0-3 each.

14 September 2025 Round 3	Dohenys	1-13 - 0-11	O'Donovan Rossa	Páirc Tadhg na Samhna
	M Buckley (0-4, 1f), K White (0-3, 2f), C Daly (1-0), O McCarthy (0-2), A O’Donovan, K McCarthy, S Daly (1f), P Crowley (0-1 each).	Report	K Davis (0-5, 1 2ptf, 3f), E Connolly, L Connolly, I Harte (2ptf) (0-2 each).

== Relegation stage ==
=== Relegation playoff ===
27 September 2025 Relegation playoff	O'Donovan Rossa	1-18 - 0-17	Fermoy	Páirc Uí Rinn
	K Davis 0-6 (0-2f), L Harte 1-0, N Daly 0-2, O Leahy 0-2, K Hurley 0-2 (1-2pt), D Hourihane jnr 0-2(1-2pt), D Daly, B Crowley, T Hegarty, I Harte (0-1 each).	Report	D Daly 0-5 (1-2pt), B Twomey 0-4 (2-2pt f), D Lardner 0-3, S Aherne 0-2 (1-2pt), J O’Brien, G Lardner, P De Roiste (0-1 each).

== Knockout stage ==
=== Quarter-finals ===
27 September 2025 Quarter-final	Knocknagree	2-19 - 0-23 (aet)	Kanturk	Fr Kelleher Park
	Denis O’Connor 0-6 (1 2pt), M McSweeney 1-2, A O’Connor 0-3 (1 2pt), David O’Connor 1-0, M Dilworth, G Looney 0-2 each, P Doyle (0-1 45), E McSweeney, F O’Connor, D Twomey 0-1 each.	Report	G Bucinskas 0-8 (1 2ptf), 0-2 f), R Cashman 0-6 (3 2ptf), P Walsh, I Walsh (0-2f) 0-3 each, B O'Sullivan 0-2, M Healy 0-1

28 September 2025 Quarter-final	Éire Óg	1-17 - 1-13	Bishopstown	Páirc Dhónaill Uí Cheallacháin
	E O’Shea 1-2, J Murphy 0-5 (0-1 f), D Goulding 0-3 (1 tpf, 0-1 f), C O’Callaghan 0-2, R O’Flynn, D Foley, H Murphy, B Hurley, D Clifford 0-1 each.	Report	C Dunne 1-7 (0-6 f), K McFadden, S Collins 0-2 each, B Clifford, D O’Donovan 0-1 each.

=== Semi-finals ===
11 October 2025 Semi-final	Cill na Martra	1-17 - 1-13	Éire Óg	SuperValu Páirc Uí Chaoimh
	D Ó hUrdail 0-5 (2 tp), J Mac Carthaigh (1 tp 1 f), D Ó Duinnín 0-3 each, T Ó Corcora 1-0, S Ó Fóirréidh, S Ó Duinnín 0-2 each, A Ó Cuana, D Mac Lochlainn 0-1 each.	Report	R O’Flynn 1-3, D Goulding 0-4 (1 tpf, 2 fs), D Clifford 0-3, C O’Callaghan, D Foley, C McGoldrick (f) 0-1 each.

11 October 2025 Semi-final	Béal Átha'n Ghaorthaidh	1-10 - 2-19	Knocknagree	SuperValu Páirc Uí Chaoimh
	D Mac Thomáis 1-2, C Ó Loingsigh 0-4, S Ó Tuama 0-2, B Seartan (f), D Seartan 0-1 each.	Report	A O’Connor 1-6 (1 2pt, 0-2 f), Denis R O’Connor, M McSweeney 0-4 each, N O'Connor 1-0, T O’Connor 0-2, M Mahoney, E McSweeney, F O’Connor 0-1 each.

=== Final ===
25 October 2025 Final	Cill na Martra	0-17 - 2-17	Knocknagree	SuperValu Páirc Uí Chaoimh
	J Mac Cárthaigh 0-6 (0-4 f), D Ó Duinnín 0-4 (1 2pt, 0-2 f), S Ó Duinnín, C Ó Forréidgh (2pt) 0-2 each, D Ó hUrdail, D Ó Conaill, T Ó Corcora 0-1 each.	Report	N O’Connor 1-3, A O’Connor 0-4 (0-2 f), David O’Connor 1-0, G Looney, E McSweeney, Denis R O’Connor, David Twomey 0-2 each, M McSweeney, P Doyle (0-1 45) 0-1 each.	Referee: C Murphy (Glanworth)

== Championship statistics ==
=== Top scorers ===
Overall

Rank	Player	Club	Tally	Total	Matches	Average
1	Anthony O'Connor	Knocknagree	2-29	35	6	5.83
2	Jason Mac Cárthaigh	Cill na Martra	0-25	25	5	5.00
3	Conor Corbett	Clyda Rovers	2-17	23	3	7.66
4	Grantas Buckinskas	Kanturk	0-22	22	4	5.50
5	Diarmuid Mac Thomáis	Béal Átha'n Ghaorthaidh	2-15	21	4	5.25
5	Kevin Davis	O'Donovan Rossa	0-21	21	4	5.25
7	Conor Dunne	Fermoy	1-16	19	4	4.75
7	Denis O'Connor	Knocknagree	0-19	19	6	3.16
9	Michael McSweeney	Knocknagree	1-14	17	6	2.83
10	Niall O'Connor	Knocknagree	3-07	16	5	3.20
10	David Lardner	Fermoy	1-13	16	4	4.00

Single game

Rank	Player	Club	Tally	Total	Opposition
1	Conor Corbett	Clyda Rovers	1-09	12	Knocknagree
2	Anthony O'Connor	Knocknagree	1-07	10	Clyda Rovers
2	Conor Dunne	Bishopstown	1-07	10	Éire Óg
4	Ciarán Ó Duinnín	Cill na Martra	1-06	9	Fermoy
4	Anthony O'Connor	Knocknagree	1-06	9	Béal Átha'n Ghaorthaidh
6	Grantas Buckinskas	Kanturk	0-08	8	Knocknagree
7	Paul Walsh	Kanturk	2-01	7	Kilshannig
7	Conor Corbett	Clyda Rovers	1-04	7	Fermoy
7	Kevin Davis	O'Donovan Rossa	1-04	7	Bishopstown
7	Fionn Herlihy	Dohenys	1-04	7	Bishopstown
7	Diarmuid Mac Thomáis	Béal Átha'n Ghaorthaidh	0-07	7	O'Donovan Rossa
7	Jason Mac Cárthaigh	Cill na Martra	0-07	7	Fermoy
7	Jason Mac Cárthaigh	Cill na Martra	0-07	7	Clyda Rovers
