= Daniel O'Mahony (Gaelic footballer) =

Irish Gaelic footballer

Personal information
- Native name: Donal O'Mathuna (Irish)
- Born: 2000 (age 25–26) Knocknagree, County Cork, Ireland
- Occupation: Accountant
- Height: 6 ft 1 in (185 cm)

Sport
- Sport: Gaelic Football
- Position: Full-back
Club
- Years: Club
- Knocknagree
Club titles
- Cork titles: 0
College
- Years: College
- 2019-2023: University College Cork
College titles
- Sigerson titles: 1
Inter-county*
Years	County	Apps (scores)
2020 - present	Cork	1 (0-01)
Inter-county titles
- Munster titles: 0
- All-Irelands: 0
- NFL: 0
- All Stars: 0
- *Inter County team apps and scores correct as of 12:30, 03 May 2024.

Daniel O'Mahony (born 2000) is an Irish Gaelic footballer. At club level he plays with Knocknagree and at inter-county level with the Cork senior football team.

== Career ==
As a child, O'Mahony played at juvenile and underage levels with Knocknagree GAA Club. After making his senior team debut in 2018, he was part of the club's Cork Intermediate and Premier Intermediate Championship victories in 2019 and 2021.

O'Mahony won the 2023 Sigerson Cup with UCC, and was subsequently named both on the 2023 "Sigerson Team of the Year" and won the overall Sigerson "Player of the Year" award for 2023.

O'Mahony made his Senior intercounty debut for the Cork Senior football team against Kildare in 2020. Since then, he has played at full-back for the Cork Senior football team.

== Personal life ==
O'Mahony's maternal uncle is former Kerry senior footballer Aidan O'Mahony. This led him to don the Kerry jersey in support during his uncle's playing years with Kerry.

Prior to playing Gaelic football, he played rugby.
