= Eoghan McSweeney =

Irish Gaelic footballer (born 1997)

Personal information
- Native name: Eoghan Mac Suibhne (Irish)
- Born: 1997 (age 28–29) Knocknagree, Ireland

Sport
- Sport: Gaelic football
- Position: Left wing-forward
Clubs
- Years: Club
- Knocknagree → Duhallow
Club titles
- Cork titles: 0
Inter-county
- Years: County
- 2019-present: Cork
Inter-county titles
- Munster titles: 0
- All-Irelands: 0
- NFL: 0
- All Stars: 0

Eoghan McSweeney (born 1997) is an Irish Gaelic footballer. At club he plays with Knocknagree and at inter-county level with the Cork senior football team. He usually lines out as a forward.

== Honours ==
Knocknagree

- Cork Premier Intermediate Football Championship: 2020
- Cork Intermediate Football Championship: 2019
- All-Ireland Junior Club Football Championship: 2018
- Munster Junior Club Football Championship: 2017
- Cork Junior A Football Championship: 2017
- Duhallow Junior A Football Championship: 2015, 2016
