= Fionn =

Fionn (Irish: [fʲiːn̪ˠ], Scottish Gaelic: [fjũːn̪ˠ]) is a masculine given name in Irish and Scottish Gaelic. In English, it is pronounced "Fyun". It is derived from a byname meaning "white" or "fair-haired". It is the original version of a name later anglicized as Find and Finn.

It may refer to:

== People ==
=== Men ===
- Fionn Carr (born 1985), Irish former rugby union footballer
- Fionn Dunne, materials scientist
- Fionn Ferreira (born 2000 or 2001), Irish inventor and chemist
- Fionn Fitzgerald (born 1990), Irish Gaelic footballer
- Fionn Gibbons (born 2002), Irish rugby union footballer
- Fionn Hand (born 1998), Irish cricketer
- Fionn Herlihy (born 2000), Irish Gaelic footballer
- Fionn MacColla (1906–1975), Scottish novelist
- Fionn mac Cumhaill, figure from Irish mythology
- Fionn McLaughlin (born 2007), Irish racing driver
- Fionn McLoughlin (born 1982), Irish rugby union footballer
- Fionn O'Shea (born 1997), Irish actor
- Fionn Regan (born 1981), Irish folk musician and singer-songwriter
- Fionn Whitehead (born 1997), English actor

=== Women ===
- Fionn Griffiths (born 1982), British mountain bike racer and sports team manager
- Fionn Stevenson (born 1959), Anglo-German architect, academic, anti-nuclear weapons activist, anarchist and feminist born Fiona Stevenson

== Mythical figures ==
- Fionn mac Cumhaill, sometimes anglicised as Finn McCool or MacCool, Irish mythical hero
- nickname of the protagonist of The Boyhood Deeds of Fionn, a medieval Irish mythical narrative

== See also ==
- Fenian Cycle, also known as the Fionn Cycle, a grouping of Irish mythological texts

== See also ==
- List of Irish-language given names
- List of Scottish Gaelic given names
