= 2020 Cork Premier Intermediate Football Championship =

- Dates: 25 July 2020 - 1 August 2021
- Teams: 12
- Sponsor: Bon Secours Hospital
- Champions: Knocknagree (1st title); Kealan Buckley (captain); John Fintan Daly (manager)
- Runners-up: Kanturk; John McLoughlin (captain); Tim Healy (manager)
- Relegated: Gabriel Rangers

Tournament statistics
- Matches played: 24
- Goals scored: 64 (2.67 per match)
- Points scored: 549 (22.88 per match)
- Top scorer(s): Fintan O'Connor (0-28)

The 2020 Cork Premier Intermediate Football Championship was the 15th staging of the Cork Premier Intermediate Football Championship since its establishment by the Cork County Board in 2006. The draw for the group stage placings took place on 19 November 2019. The championship was scheduled to begin in April 2020, however, it was postponed indefinitely due to the 2020 coronavirus pandemic in Ireland. The championship eventually began on 25 July 2020 and, after being suspended once again on 5 October 2020, eventually ended on 1 August 2021.

The final was played on 1 August 2021 at Páirc Uí Chaoimh in Cork, between Knocknagree and Kanturk, in what was their first meeting in a final. Knocknagree won the match by 0-12 to 0-09 to claim their first ever championship title in the grade.

Knocknagree's Fintan O'Connor was the championship's top scorer with 0-28.

== Format change ==
On 26 March 2019, three championship proposals were circulated to Cork club delegates. A core element running through all three proposals, put together by the Cork GAA games workgroup, was that there be a group stage of 12 teams and straight relegation and promotion. On 2 April 2019, a majority of 136 club delegates voted for Option A which will see one round of games played in April and two more in August – all with county players available.

== Team changes ==
=== To Championship ===
Promoted from the Cork Intermediate Football Championship

- Gabriel Rangers
- Knocknagree

=== From Championship ===
Promoted to the Cork Senior A Football Championship

- Bandon
- Bantry Blues
- Béal Átha'n Ghaorthaidh
- Éire Óg
- St Michael's

== Results ==
=== Group 1 ===
==== Table ====
Advance to play-offs Advance to relegation play-offs

| Team | Matches | | | | Score | | | Pts |
| Team | Pld | W | D | L | For | Against | Diff | Pts |
|---|---|---|---|---|---|---|---|---|
| Newmarket | 3 | 3 | 0 | 0 | 7-36 | 3-27 | 21 | 6 |
| Aghada | 3 | 2 | 0 | 1 | 1-39 | 4-24 | 6 | 4 |
| Castletownbere | 3 | 1 | 0 | 2 | 6-26 | 5-36 | -7 | 2 |
| Na Piarsaigh | 3 | 0 | 0 | 3 | 5-24 | 7-38 | -20 | 0 |

==== Results ====
| 25 July 2020 Round 1 | Newmarket | 2-14 - 1-06 | Na Piarsaigh | Banteer Sportsfield |
| | C O’Keeffe 1-6(0-3f), D Hannon 0-5(0-3f), R O’Keeffe (1-1), B O’Connor, M Cottrell 0-1 each. | Report | A Keating (1-1), K Buckley 0-2f, A Hogan, S Forde, G Joyce(f) 0-1 each. |

| 25 July 2020 Round 1 | Castletownbere | 0-07 - 0-13 | Aghada | Kilmurry Sportsfield |
| | G Murphy 0-4 (0-2 frees), D Hegarty 0-3 (all frees). | Report | D Creedon 0-3 (0-1 free), C Fleming (0-1 ’45) and K O’Hanlon 0-2 each, T Hartnett, C Terry, A Berry, P O’Neill, A Stafford and J O Hanlon (free) 0-1 each. |

| 16 August 2020 Round 2 | Newmarket | 2-10 - 0-11 | Aghada | Grenagh |
| | D Hannon (1-3, 2 frees); C O’Keeffe (0-4, 3 frees); B O’Connor (1-1); M Cottrell, R O’Keeffe (0-1 each). | Report | D Creedon (0-3 frees), C Terry (0-3), K O’Hanlon (0-2), T Harnett, M Russell, C Fleming 0-1 each. | Referee: Canice Walsh |

| 16 August 2020 Round 2 | Na Piarsaigh | 2-11 - 4-09 | Castletownbere | Inchigeela |
| | K Forde (2-0), K Buckley (0-5, 1 free, 1 ‘45’), A Hogan (0-3 frees), A Keating (0-2), S Forde (0-1). | Report | G Murphy (1-5, 0-1 free), J Walsh, James Harrington (1-1 each), A O’Sullivan (1-0 pen), D Dunne and R Murphy (free) (0-1 each). | Referee: Colm O Mochain |

| 5 September 2020 Round 3 | Na Piarsaigh | 2-07 - 1-15 | Aghada | Páirc Shéamuis de Barra |
| | A Keating 1-2, S Forde 1-0, C O'Mahony 0-3, K Forde 0-2. | | K O'Hanlon 1-1, D Creedon 0-4, P O'Neill 0-3, C Fleming 0-2, S Bennett 0-2, R Savage 0-1, A Stafford 0-1, D Phelan 0-1. |

| 5 September 2020 Round 3 | Newmarket | 3-12 - 2-10 | Castletownbere | Clondrohid |
| | R O’Keeffe (1-4, 0-1 free), C O’Keeffe (0-4), D Culloty (1-1), D O’Keeffe (1-0), B O’Connor (0-2), M Cottrell (0-1). | Report | G Murphy (1-6, 0-4 frees), J Harrington (1-0), D Hanley, T Murphy, D Fenton and A O’Sullivan (0-1 each). |

=== Group 2 ===
==== Table ====
Advance to play-offs Advance to relegation play-offs

| Team | Matches | | | | Score | | | Pts |
| Team | Pld | W | D | L | For | Against | Diff | Pts |
|---|---|---|---|---|---|---|---|---|
| Cill an Martra | 3 | 3 | 0 | 0 | 11-36 | 1-28 | 38 | 6 |
| Knocknagree | 3 | 1 | 1 | 1 | 1-40 | 8-32 | -13 | 3 |
| St. Vincent's | 3 | 1 | 0 | 2 | 3-29 | 7-39 | -22 | 2 |
| Naomh Abán | 3 | 0 | 1 | 2 | 3-32 | 2-38 | -3 | 1 |

==== Results ====
| 26 July 2020 Round 1 | Naomh Abán | 1-06 - 0-11 | Cill an Martra | Castle Grounds |
| | D Ó Ceallaigh (1-2, 1 mark); M Ó Duinnín (0-2 frees); C Ó Deasúna agus M Ó Laoghaire (0-1 each). | Report | M Ó Deasúna (0-7, 6 frees); D Ó Conaill, D Ó hUrdail, S Ó Foirréidh agus S Ó Duinnín (0-1 each). |

| 26 July 2020 Round 1 | St. Vincent's | 1-07 - 1-13 | Knocknagree | Páirc Eoin Mhic Chárthaigh |
| | B Murphy (0-3, 2 frees); A O’Callaghan (1-0); A Harte (0-2); D Duggan, J P Murphy (0-1 each). | Report | G Looney (1-0); F O’Connor (0-3 1 free); J F Daly (0-3); D O’Connor (0-3); E McSweeney (0-2); J Dennehy, David O’Connor (0-1 each). | Referee: D Whelan (Aghada) |

| 15 August 2020 Round 2 | Cill an Martra | 4-14 - 0-09 | St. Vincent's | Coachford Sportsfield |
| | S Ó Duinnín 1-3, M Ó Deasúna 1-3 (1-0 pen, 0-3 frees), D Ó hUrdail 0-4 (0-1 free), D Ó Duinnín 1-1, T Ó Corcora 1-0, C Ó Duinnín 0-2, D Ó Conaill 0-1. | Report | B Murphy 0-6 (0-3 frees), A Harte, D O’Regan and K Lynch 0-1 each. |

| 15 August 2020 Round 2 | Naomh Abán | 0-14 - 0-14 | Knocknagree | Banteer Sportsfield |
| | M Ó Duinnín (0-4, 1 free, 1 sideline), D Ó Ceallaigh (frees), D Ó hAileamhain (1 free, 1 ’45) (0-3 each), A Ó Luasa (0-2), M Ó Laoghaire agus É Ó Críodáin (0-1 each). | Report | F O’Connor (0-7, 5 frees), E McSweeney (0-2), P Doyle (’45), M Mahoney, D O’Connor, G Looney and M Dilworth (0-1 each). |

| 5 September 2020 Round 3 | Cill an Martra | 7-11 - 0-13 | Knocknagree | Mourne Abbey |
| | C Ó Duinnín (2-2); D Ó Duinnín (1-4); D Ó hUrdail (2-1); S Ó Duinnín (1-3); G Ó Goillidhe (1-0); C Ó Meachair (0-1). | Report | F O’Connor (0-5, 0-5 frees); JF Daly (0-3); D O’Connor (0-1 mark), P Doyle (0-1 ‘45), M Doyle, P O’Connor, E McSweeney (0-1 each). |

| 5 September 2020 Round 3 | Naomh Abán | 2-12 - 2-13 | St. Vincent's | Cloughduv |
| | M Ó Duinnín (0-6, 3 frees), M Ó Liatháin and A Ó Luasa (1-1 each), D Ó Ceallaigh (0-3, 1 free), C Ó Deasúna (0-1). | Report | B Murphy (1-6, 4 frees), M O’Leary (1-1), G McCarthy (0-2), S Duggan, A Harte, D Duggan and JP Murphy (0-1 each). |

=== Group 3 ===
==== Table ====
Advance to play-offs Advance to relegation play-offs

| Team | Matches | | | | Score | | | Pts |
| Team | Pld | W | D | L | For | Against | Diff | Pts |
|---|---|---|---|---|---|---|---|---|
| Nemo Rangers | 3 | 2 | 0 | 1 | 12-30 | 5-41 | 10 | 4 |
| Kanturk | 3 | 2 | 0 | 1 | 5-42 | 5-34 | 8 | 4 |
| Macroom | 3 | 2 | 0 | 1 | 6-38 | 8-29 | 3 | 4 |
| Garbriel Rangers | 3 | 0 | 0 | 3 | 3-37 | 8-43 | -21 | 0 |

==== Results ====
| 25 July 2020 Round 1 | Macroom | 1-10 - 1-11 | Kanturk | Cullen Sportsfield |
| | D Twomey (1-2, 0-2 frees), F Goold (0-3, 0-1 free), S Kiely and E O’Gorman (0-2 each), J Murphy (0-1). | Report | I Walsh (0-4, 0-2 frees), L O’Neill (1-0), L O’Keeffe (0-2), L McLoughlin, J Browne, M Healy, C Clernon and A Walsh (0-1 each). |

| 26 July 2020 Round 1 | Nemo Rangers | 3-14 - 1-11 | Gabriel Rangers | Kilmichael Sportsfield |
| | L Horgan 2-0, C Kiely 0-5, R Dalton 0-4, C Dalton 1-0, J Coogan 0-2, A Greaney 0-2, E Dilloughrey 0-1. | | M Cronin 0-4, C o'Brien 1-0, K O'Driscoll 0-3, J O'Brien 0-2, G O'Callaghan 0-2. |

| 14 August 2020 Round 2 | Macroom | 1-15 - 2-10 | Gabriel Rangers | Sam Maguire Park |
| | D Twomey (0-6, 2 frees), T Dineen (1-1), C O’Sullivan (0-3, 2 frees), D Horgan (0-2), E O’Gorman, D Creedon, F Goold (0-1 each). | Report | G O’Callaghan (0-7, 3 frees, 1 45), L Hegarty, K O’Sullivan (1-0 each), C Moynihan (0-2), J O’Regan (0-1). | Referee: A Whelton (Cloankilty) |

| 16 August 2020 Round 2 | Kanturk | 0-17 - 4-08 | Nemo Rangers | O'Connell Park |
| | I Walsh (0-5, 0-3 frees), M Healy (0-1 free), K Holland and A Walsh (0-3 each), L O’Keeffe (0-2), L McLoughlin (0-1). | Report | R Dalton (1-2, 0-1 free), A Greaney (1-1), C Dalton and E Dilloughrey (1-0 each), J Coogan (0-4), C Kiely (0-1). | Referee: P O'Driscoll |

| 5 September 2020 Round 3 | Kanturk | 4-14 - 0-16 | Gabriel Rangers | Ballingeary |
| | K Holland (2-7, 0-3 frees, 0-1 ‘45), L O’Keeffe and Alan Walsh (1-0 each), I Walsh (0-2, 0-1 free), L O’Neill, C Kernan, M Healy (free), C O’Sullivan and P Walsh (0-1 each). | Report | M Cronin (0-7, 0-4 frees), G O’Callaghan (0-5, 0-2 frees), J Fitzpatrick, K O’Brien, K O’Sullivan and K O’Driscoll (0-1 each). |

| 5 September 2020 Round 3 | Macroom | 4-13 - 5-08 | Nemo Rangers | Páirc Naomh Eoin |
| | D Twomey (1-4, 2 frees), S Kiely (0-5), E O’Leary (1-0), F Goold (1-0), A Quinn (1-0), E O’Gorman (0-2, 0-1 mark), D Horgan, C O’Sullivan (0-1) each. | Report | R Dalton (1-4, 4 frees), C Kiely (1-1), L Horgan (1-0), J Coogan (1-0), K Fulignati (1-0), E Dilloughrey (0-2), A Greaney (1 free). |

=== Knock-out stage ===
==== Relegation playoff ====
| 19 September 2020 Playoff | Gabriel Rangers | 0-07 - 0-13 | Na Piarsaigh | Ballinacarriga Sportsfield |
| | M Cronin (0-4, 3f), G O'Callaghan (free), J O'Regan (free), K O'Driscoll (0-1 each). | Report | A Hogan (0-5, 3f, 0-1m), P Guest (0-4), C O'Mahony (0-2), D Maguire, A Higgins (0-1 each). |

==== Quarter-finals ====
| 19 September 2020 Quarter-final | Kanturk | 0-17 - 0-08 | Aghada | Ovens |
| | K Holland (0-5 frees), P Walsh (0-1 free) and C Clernon (0-3 each), I Walsh (0-1 free) and J McLoughlin (0-2 each), L McLoughlin and G Keneghan (0-1 each). | Report | P O’Neill, K O’Hanlon, D Creedon (0-1 free) and J Looney (0-2 each). |

| 19 September 2020 Quarter-final | Nemo Rangers | 0-12 - 1-10 | Knocknagree | Páirc Eoin Mhic Charthaigh |
| | A Greaney 0-5 f, C Kiely 0-3 (0-2 f), J O’Donovan 0-2, E Dilloughrey, A O’Donovan 0-1 each. | Report | F O’Connor 0-4 (0-2 f), M Dilworth 1-1, E McSweeney 0-2, G Looney, D O’Connor, JF Daly (f) 0-1 each. |

==== Semi-finals ====
| 26 September 2020 Semi-final | Newmarket | 0-14 - 0-15 | Knocknagree | O'Connor-McLoughlin Memorial Park |
| | C O'Keeffe 0-6 (4f), D Hannon (2f), R O'Keeffe (1f) 0-2 each, A Browne, D O'Keeffe (1f), T O'Keeffe, A Browne 0-1 each. | Report | E McSweeney 0-5 (0-1sl), F O'Connor 0-3 (2f), M Dilworth 0-2, P Doyle (1f), J Fintan Daly, G Looney, D O'Connor, G O'Connor 0-1 each. |

| 3 October 2020 Semi-final | Cill Na Martra | 0-11 - 0-12 | Kanturk | Mallow GAA Complex |
| | S Ó Duinnín and M Ó Deasúna (0-1 45, 0-2 frees, 0-3 each), D Ó Duinnín and C Ó Duinnín (0-2 each), D Ó hUrdail (0-1 free). | Report | C Clernon (0-4, 0-1 free), I Walsh (0-1 free) and R Walsh (0-3 each), P Walsh and L O’Neill (0-1 each). |

==== Final ====
| 1 August 2021 Final | Knocknagree | 0-12 - 0-09 | Kanturk | Páirc Uí Chaoimh |
| | F O’Connor (0-6, 0-4 frees), E McSweeney (0-3), M Dilworth (free), G Looney, D Cooper (0-1 each). | Report | I Walsh (0-5, 0-4 frees), P Walsh, L O’Keeffe, K Holland (45), D O’Connell (mark) (0-1 each). | Referee: D Murnane (Macroom) |

== Championship statistics ==
=== Top scorers ===
Overall

| Rank | Player | Club | Tally | Total | Matches | Average |
|---|---|---|---|---|---|---|
| 1 | Fintan O'Connor | Knocknagree | 0-28 | 28 | 6 | 4.66 |
| 2 | Conor O'Keeffe | Newmarket | 1-20 | 23 | 4 | 5.75 |
| 3 | Kyrle Holland | Kanturk | 2-16 | 22 | 6 | 3.66 |
| 4 | Gary Murphy | Castletownbere | 2-15 | 21 | 3 | 7.00 |
| 4 | Ian Walsh | Kanturk | 0-21 | 21 | 6 | 3.50 |
| 6 | Dylan Twomey | Macroom | 2-12 | 18 | 3 | 6.00 |
| 6 | Blake Murphy | St. Vincent's | 1-15 | 18 | 3 | 6.00 |
| 8 | Ronan Dalton | Nemo Rangers | 2-10 | 16 | 3 | 5.33 |
| 8 | Shane Ó Duinnín | Cill na Martra | 2-10 | 16 | 4 | 4.00 |
| 8 | Mícheál Ó Deasúna | Cill na Martra | 1-13 | 16 | 4 | 4.00 |

In a single game

| Rank | Player | Club | Tally | Total | Opposition |
|---|---|---|---|---|---|
| 1 | Kyrle Holland | Kanturk | 2-07 | 13 | Gabriel Rangers |
| 2 | Conor O'Keeffe | Newmarket | 1-06 | 9 | Na Piarsaigh |
| 2 | Gary Murphy | Castletownbere | 1-06 | 9 | Newmarket |
| 2 | Blake Murphy | St. Vincent's | 1-06 | 9 | Naomh Abán |
| 5 | Ciarán Ó Duinnín | Cill na Martra | 2-02 | 8 | Knocknagree |
| 5 | Gary Murphy | Castletownbere | 1-05 | 8 | Na Piarsaigh |
| 7 | Damien Ó hÚrdail | Cill na Martra | 2-01 | 7 | Knocknagree |
| 7 | Dylan Twomey | Macroom | 1-04 | 7 | Nemo Rangers |
| 7 | Ronan Dalton | Nemo Rangers | 1-04 | 7 | Macroom |
| 7 | Ryan O'Keeffe | Newmarket | 1-04 | 7 | Castletownbere |
| 7 | Dan Dineen | Cill na Martra | 1-04 | 7 | Knocknagree |
| 7 | Mícheál Ó Deasúna | Cill na Martra | 0-07 | 7 | Naomh Abán |
| 7 | Fintan O'Connor | Knocknagree | 0-07 | 7 | Naomh Abán |
| 7 | Ger O'Callaghan | Gabriel Rangers | 0-07 | 7 | Macroom |

=== Miscellaneous ===
- Knocknagree win the title for the first time.
- Aghada marked the passing of former player Kieran O'Connor by retiring their No.4 shirt for their first-round match against Castletownbere. O'Connor was also listed on the Aghada team sheet.
