= 2019 Cork Intermediate Football Championship =

84th staging of the Cork Intermediate Football Championship

- Dates: 7 April - 2 November 2019
- Teams: 19
- Sponsor: Evening Echo
- Champions: Knocknagree (1st title); Gary O'Connor (captain); John Fintan Daly (manager)
- Runners-up: Gabriel Rangers; Gerald O'Callaghan (captain); Brian Hayes (manager)
- Promoted: Knocknagree; Gabriel Rangers
- Relegated: Grenagh; Youghal

Tournament statistics
- Matches played: 32
- Goals scored: 69 (2.16 per match)
- Points scored: 735 (22.97 per match)
- Top scorer(s): Anthony O'Connor (6-35)

The 2019 Cork Intermediate Football Championship was the 84th staging of the Cork Intermediate Football Championship since its establishment by the Cork County Board in 1909. The draw for the opening round fixtures took place on 15 January 2019. The championship ran from 7 April to 2 November 2019.

The final was played on 2 November 2019 at Páirc Uí Rinn in Cork, between Knocknagree and Gabriel Rangers, in what was their first ever meeting in the final. Knocknagree won the match by 2–10 to 1–11 to claim their first ever championship title.

Knocknagree's Anthony O'Connor was the championship's top scorer with 6-35.

== Team changes ==
=== To Championship ===
Promoted from the Cork Junior A Football Championship

- Dromtarriffe

=== From Championship ===
Promoted to the Cork Premier Intermediate Football Championship

- Cill na Martra

Relegated to the South East Junior A Football Championship

- Carrigaline

Relegated to the South West Junior A Football Championship

- Clonakilty

== Results ==
=== Preliminary round ===
13 April 2019 Preliminary round	Kildorrery	0-07 - 1-13	Knocknagree	Fr Kelleher Park
	S O'Neill 0-2, F Stapleton 0-2, M Walsh 0-2, J O'Sullivan 0-1.		JF Daly 1-2, F O'Connor 0-4, A O'Connor 0-3, E McSweeney 0-2, D Moynihan 0-1, P Collins 0-1.

=== Round 1 ===
7 April 2019 Round 1	Glanworth	1-13 - 0-12	St Finbarr's	Carraig na bhFear Grounds
	S O'Riordan 0-7, D Pyne 1-2, S Finn 0-2, D Connolly 0-1, P O'Driscoll 0-1.		F O'Shea 0-8, A Murphy 0-2, C O'Sullivan 0-1, B O'Connell 0-1.

7 April 2019 Round 1	Mayfield	1-15 - 2-09	Glenville	Blarney Grounds
	P Condon 0-8, S O'Donovan 1-0, D Lucey 0-3, C O'Neill 0-2, M Barry 0-1, N Kelly 0-1.		A Murphy 2-2, D Dennehy 0-2, PJ Dennehy 0-1, D Hegarty 0-1, D O'Donovan 0-1, E Delahunt 0-1, D McCarthy 0-1.

13 April 2019 Round 1	Kinsale	1-15 - 0-14	Ballydesmond	Carrigadrohid Grounds
	G Finn 1-5, B Coughlan 0-5, C Donnellan 0-2, J O'Brien 0-1, T Broderick 0-1, B McGrory 0-1.		D O'Connor 0-7, S Carey 0-2, D Moynihan 0-2, N Fleming 0-2, R Flynn 0-1.

13 April 2019 Round 1	Grenagh	0-12 - 2-11	Glanmire	Blarney Grounds
	DD Dorgan 0-6, L Walsh 0-2, K O'Neill 0-2, P Barry-Murphy 0-1, C Buckley 0-1.		D Molden 1-4, S O'Driscoll 1-3, J Murphy 0-2, C Shine 0-1, K Kenneally 0-1.

13 April 2019 Round 1	Rockchapel	4-06 - 0-08	Ballinora	Duggan Park
	L Collins 2-2, S Hickey 1-2, J Curtin 1-0, J Walsh 0-1, M McAuliffe 0-1.		B Ahern 0-3, D Holmes 0-2, M Murphy 0-1, I Wycherley 0-1, D Dineen 0-1.

14 April 2019 Round 1	Aghabullogue	2-08 - 1-08	Mitchelstown	Mallow GAA Complex
	D Thompson 2-3, M Bradley 0-2, S O'Sullivan 0-1, E O'Sullivan 0-1, L Casey 0-1.		C O'Mahony 1-3, J Sheehan 0-4, S O'Sullivan 0-1.

14 April 2019 Round 1	Dromtarriffe	3-09 - 1-10	Millstreet	Cullen Grounds
	S Collins 2-1, D O'Keeffe 0-7, A Buckley 1-0, C O'Callaghan 0-1.		C Crowley 0-6, K Crowley 1-0, D Murphy 0-1, J Linehan 0-1, M Murphy 0-1, M Ellis 0-1.

14 April 2019 Round 1	Gabriel Rangers	0-09 - 0-05	Adrigole	St Colum's Grounds
	E Goggin 0-4, G O'Callaghan 0-2, S Walden 0-1, M Cronin 0-1, S Kelleher 0-1.		K Goggin 0-2, J Harrington 0-1, KJ O'Sullivan 0-1, R O'Sullivan 0-1.

4 May 2019 Round 1	Knocknagree	3-19 - 0-05	Youghal	Ballincollig Grounds
	A O'Connor 2-6, E McSweeney 1-3, F O'Connor 0-3, D Moynihan 0-3, JF Daly 0-2, D O'Connor 0-1, D Cooper 0-1.		J Ormonde 0-1, J O'Mahony 0-1, A Frahill-O'Connor 0-1, K McCarthy 0-1, J Cooper 0-1.

=== Round 2 ===
10 August 2019 Round 2	Ballinora	1-11 - 1-08	Adrigole	Kilmichael Grounds
	B Ahern 0-7, J Keohane 1-0, I Wycherley 0-1, A O'Shea 0-1, M Murphy 0-1, D Corkery 0-1.		K Goggin 1-4, KJ O'Sullivan 0-3, T O'Shea 0-1.

10 August 2019 Round 2	Kildorrery	1-15 - 0-19 (aet)	Ballydesmond	Fr Kelleher Park
	S O'Neill 0-7, T Monaghan 1-2, C Harrington 0-2, W Fouhy 0-2, S Fitzgerald 0-1, D Kent 0-1.		D O'Connor 0-10, D Moynihan 0-4, N Fleming 0-2, S Cronin 0-1, S Carey 0-1, B Fleming 0-1.

11 August 2019 Round 2	Youghal	0-13 - 0-19	Millstreet	Carraig na bhFear Grounds
	K McCarthy 0-5, A Joyce 0-3, J O'Mahony 0-1, R Cunningham 0-1, C Spillane 0-1, P Kelly 0-1.		D Kiely 0-5, M Ellis 0-4, N Flahive 0-3, J Linehan 0-2, C O'Leary 0-2, S Hickey 0-2, J Broxton 0-1.

25 August 2019 Round 2	Glenville	1-14 - 0-12	Mitchelstown	Ballyhooly Grounds
	D McCarthy 1-0, J Cooke 0-3, J Gowen 0-3, S Field 0-2, A Murphy 0-2, W Connolly 0-2, S Desmond 0-1, K O'Neill 0-1.		S Dineen 0-2, S Cahill 0-2, S Beston 0-2, M Walsh 0-2, J Cott 0-2, J Sheehan 0-2.

8 September 2019 Round 2	St Finbarr's	1-14 - 0-11	Grenagh	Blarney Grounds
	F O'Shea 0-6, A Turner 1-1, C Buckley 0-3, C Davey 0-1, M Griffin 0-1, L Hannigan 0-1, C O'Sullivan 0-1.		U Duggan 0-4, D Dorgan 0-4, P Barry-Murphy 0-3.

=== Relegation playoffs ===
21 September 2019 Round 1	Mitchelstown	2-14 - 1-11	Adrigole	Cloughduv Grounds
	J Sheehan 0-9, P Molloy 1-0, P Magee 1-0, C O'Mahony 0-3, M Walsh 0-2.		C Carey 1-0, K Goggin 0-3, S O'Sullivan 0-3, D Harrington 0-3, N O'Sullivan 0-1, KJ O'Sullivan 0-1.

21 September 2019 Round 1	Kildorrery	1-13 - 2-07	Youghal	Bride Rovers Park
	J O'Sullivan 0-4, S O'Neill 0-4, P O'Brien 1-0, J O'Gorman 0-2, T Monaghan 0-1, C Ó Baoill 0-1, F Stapleton 0-1.		K Cooper 1-1, J O'Mahony 1-1, K McCarthy 0-4, R Cunningham 0-1.

6 October 2019 Round 2	Adrigole	0-16 - 1-08	Grenagh	Kilmichael Grounds
	KJ O'Sullivan 0-6, D Harrington 0-4, K Goggin 0-4, J Harrington 0-2.		P Barry-Murphy 1-3, DD Dorgan 0-4, U Duggan 0-1.

12 October 2019 Round 3	Adrigole	1-14 - 0-09	Youghal	Jack Fitzgerald Memorial Park
	D Harrington 1-7, K Goggin 0-3, C Carey 0-2, KJ O'Sullivan 0-2.		K McCarthy 0-5, A Joyce 1-1, P Moylan 0-2, R Cunningham 0-1.

=== Round 3 ===
17 August 2019 Round 3	Millstreet	2-10 - 1-09	Mayfield	Páirc Eoin Mhic Charthaigh
	N Flahive 1-1, C Crowley 0-4, J Linehan 1-0, P Moynihan 0-2, D Kiely 0-2, A Murphy 0-2, M Ellis 0-2.		P Condon 0-5, C O'Neill 1-0, D Lucey 0-2, C Horgan 0-1, M Barry 0-1.

17 August 2019 Round 3	Glanmire	2-09 - 1-15	Ballydesmond	O'Connell Park
	D Molden 1-1, K Kenneally 1-0, J Murphy 0-3, S O'Driscoll 0-2, B Fleming 0-2.		D O'Connor 0-9, D Moynihan 1-3, S Carey 0-2, B Fleming 0-1.

25 August 2019 Round 3	Knocknagree	2-18 - 1-10	Ballinora	Clondrohid Grounds
	A O'Connor 1-8, JF Daly 1-1, E McSweeney 0-4, F O'Connor 0-2, D O'Connor 0-1, J Dennehy 0-1, M Dilworth 0-1.		B Ahern 1-1, I Wycherley 0-4, M Murphy 0-4, D Holmes 0-1.

25 August 2019 Round 3	Rockchapel	0-06 - 1-11	Glanworth	Dr Croke Park
	Jack Curtin 0-4, S Hickey 0-1, W Murphy 0-1.		S O'Riordan 0-6, P O'Driscoll 1-0, P Blackburne 0-1, D Pyne 0-1, G O'Neill 0-1, D Colfer 0-1, M Sheehan 0-1.

22 September 2019 Round 3	Aghabullogue	3-09 - 1-08	St Finbarr's	Blarney Grounds
	I Barry-Murphy 2-1, M Bradley 0-4, S O'Sullivan 1-0, D Thompson 0-2, E O'Sullivan 0-1, T Bradley 0-1.		F O'Shea 0-4, D O'Sullivan 1-0, A Murphy 0-1, M Griffin 0-1, B O'Connell 0-1, C Madden 0-1.	Referee: B Coniry (Crosshaven)

=== Quarter-finals ===
22 September 2019 Quarter-final	Gabriel Rangers	0-12 - 0-10	Kinsale	Sam Maguire Park
	E Goggin 0-5, S Kelleher 0-3, M Cronin 0-2, C Moynihan 0-2.		G Finn 0-6, B Coughlan 0-2, H Sheehan 0-1, D O'Mahony 0-1.	Referee: C Vaughan (Cill na Martra)

22 September 2019 Quarter-final	Millstreet	1-13 - 3-06	Glanworth	O'Connell Park
	C Crowley 1-4, N Flahive 0-4, S Hickey 0-1, D Buckley 0-1, M Murphy 0-1, T Sheehan 0-1, C O'Leary 0-1.		M Sheehan 1-2, J O'Sullivan 1-1, D Pyne 1-0, E O'Donoghue 0-1, S O'Riordan 0-1, S Condon 0-1.	Referee: J Horgan (Gleann na Laoi)

22 September 2019 Quarter-final	Dromtarriffe	3-09 - 1-15	Ballydesmond	Boherbue Grounds
	M O'Connor 1-0, S O'Sullivan 1-0, D O'Connor 1-0, C O'Callaghan 0-3, D O'Keeffe 0-2, E Murphy 0-2, M Healy 0-1, S Collins 0-1.		D O'Connor 0-10, N Fleming 1-2, S Carey 0-2, R Flynn 0-1.

5 October 2019 Quarter-final	Knocknagree	2-13 - 1-06	Aghabullogue	Banteer Sportsfield
	A O'Connor 1-4, JF Daly 1-1, E McSweeney 0-3, F O'Connor 0-2, M Mahony 0-1, J Dennehy 0-1, G Looney 0-1.		L Casey 1-2, S O'Connell 0-1, B Casey 0-1, E O'Sullivan 0-1, D Quinlan 0-1.	Referee: M Sheehan (Liscarroll)

6 October 2019 Quarter-final replay	Dromtarriffe	2-16 - 0-13	Ballydesmond	Boherbue Grounds
	E Murphy 0-6, C O'Callaghan 0-6, S Collins 1-1, D O'Connor 1-0, M O'Connor 0-2, D O'Donoghue 0-1.		D O'Connor 0-6, N Fleming 0-3, D Moynihan 0-1, S Carey 0-1, S Cronin 0-1, J Healy 0-1.	Referee: D Farrell (Mitchelstown)

=== Semi-finals ===
19 October 2019 Semi-final	Knocknagree	3-21 - 1-08	Millstreet	Kanturk Grounds
	A O'Connor 1-8, E McSweeney 0-6, M Dilworth 1-2, JF Daly 1-2, P Collins 0-1, F O'Connor 0-1, D O'Connor 0-1.	Report	N Flahive 1-1, J Linehan 0-2, K Crowley 0-2, D Kiely 0-1, C O'Leary 0-1, C Crowley 0-1.	Referee: C Lane (Banteer)

19 October 2019 Semi-final	Gabriel Rangers	0-16 - 0-15	Dromtarriffe	Coachford Sportsfield
	M Cronin 0-5, S Kelleher 0-4, J O'Brien 0-3, E Goggin 0-2, C Moynihan 0-1, G O'Callaghan 0-1.	Report	E Murphy 0-9, C O'Callaghan 0-3, C O'Mahony 0-2, T Howard 0-1.	Referee: A O'Connor (Ballygarvan)

=== Final ===
2 November 2019 Final	Knocknagree	2-10 - 1-11	Gabriel Rangers	Páirc Uí Rinn
	A O’Connor 1-6 (0-5 frees), E McSweeney 1-3, JF Daly 0-1.	Report	S Kelleher 0-6 (0-3 frees, 0-1 45), E Goggin 1-2 (0-1 free), C Moynihan 0-2, J O’Brien 0-1.	Referee: C Dineen (Douglas)

== Championship statistics ==
=== Top scorers ===
Overall

Rank	Player	Club	Tally	Total	Matches	Average
1	Anthony O'Connor	Knocknagree	6-35	53	6	8.83
2	Donncha O'Connor	Ballydesmond	0-42	42	5	8.40
3	Eoghan McSweeney	Knocknagree	2-21	27	6	4.50
4	John Fintan Daly	Knocknagree	4-09	21	6	3.50
5	Kevin Goggin	Adrigole	1-16	19	5	3.80
6	Cathal Crowley	Millstreet	1-15	18	4	4.50
7	Fionnán O'Shea	St Finbarr's	0-18	18	3	6.00
8	David Harrington	Adrigole	1-14	17	5	3.40
8	Evan Murphy	Dromtarriffe	0-17	17	4	4.25
10	Eddie Goggin	Gabriel Rangers	1-13	16	4	4.00

In a single game

Rank	Player	Club	Tally	Total	Opposition
1	Anthony O'Connor	Knocknagree	2-06	12	Youghal
2	Anthony O'Connor	Knocknagree	1-08	11	Ballinora
2	Anthony O'Connor	Knocknagree	1-08	11	Millstreet
4	David Harrington	Adrigole	1-07	10	Youghal
4	Donncha O'Connor	Ballydesmond	0-10	10	Dromtarriffe
4	Donncha O'Connor	Ballydesmond	0-10	10	Kildorrery
7	David Thompson	Aghabullogue	2-03	9	Mitchelstown
7	Anthony O'Connor	Knocknagree	1-06	9	Gabriel Rangers
7	James Sheehan	Mitchelstown	0-09	9	Adrigole
7	Donncha O'Connor	Ballydesmond	0-09	9	Glanmire
7	Evan Murphy	Dromtarriffe	0-09	9	Gabriel Rangers
