= 1982 Cork Junior Football Championship =

Football event in Cork

- Teams: 8
- Champions: Passage (1st title)
- Runners-up: Knocknagree

The 1982 Cork Junior Football Championship was the 84th staging of the Cork Junior Football Championship since its establishment by Cork County Board in 1895.

The final was played on 14 November 1982 at the Cloughduv Grounds, between Passage and Knocknagree, in what was their first ever meeting in the final. Passage won the match by 1–04 to 0–06 to claim their first ever championship title.

== Results ==
=== Final ===
| 14 November 1982 Final | Passage | 1–04 – 0–06 | Knocknagree | Cloughduv Grounds |
