= 2011–12 All-Ireland Intermediate Club Football Championship =

Irish Gaelic football competition

- Sponsor: Allied Irish Bank
- Champions: Milltown/Castlemaine (1st title); Damien Murphy (captain); John Fintan Daly (manager)
- Runners-up: Davitts; Michael Conroy (captain); Pete Warren (manager)

The 2011–12 All-Ireland Intermediate Club Football Championship was the ninth staging of the All-Ireland Intermediate Club Football Championship since its establishment by the Gaelic Athletic Association for the 2003–04 season.

The All-Ireland final was played on 12 February 2012 at Croke Park in Dublin, between Milltown/Castlemaine and Davitts. Milltown/Castlemaine won the match by 1-13 to 1-06 to claim their first ever championship title.
