= 1991 Cork Junior A Football Championship =

- Dates: 29 September – 10 November 1991
- Teams: 8
- Champions: Knocknagree (2nd title)
- Runners-up: Deel Rovers

Tournament statistics
- Matches played: 8
- Goals scored: 11 (1.38 per match)
- Points scored: 119 (14.88 per match)

The 1991 Cork Junior A Football Championship was the 93rd staging of the Cork Junior A Football Championship since its establishment by Cork County Board in 1895. The championship ran from 29 September to 10 November 1991.

The final was played on 10 November 1991 at the Kanturk Grounds, between Knocknagree and Deel Rovers, in what was their first ever meeting in the final. Knocknagree won the match by 2–07 to 1–08 to claim their second championship title overall and a first title in seven years.

== Qualification ==
| Division | Championship | Champions |
|---|---|---|
| Avondhu | North Cork Junior A Football Championship | Deel Rovers |
| Beara | Beara Junior A Football Championship | Urhan |
| Carbery | South West Junior A Football Championship | Carbery Rangers |
| Carrigdhoun | South East Junior A Football Championship | Carrigaline |
| Duhallow | Duhallow Junior A Football Championship | Knocknagree |
| Imokilly | East Cork Junior A Football Championship | Castlemartyr |
| Muskerry | Mid Cork Junior A Football Championship | Macroom |
| Seandún | City Junior A Football Championship | Brian Dillons |

== Results ==
=== Quarter-finals ===
| 29 September 1991 Quarter-final | Urhan | 0–09 – 0–08 | Brian Dillons | Kealkill Grounds |

| 6 October 1991 Quarter-final | Deel Rovers | 1–08 – 1–04 | Macroom | Páirc Uí Chaoimh |

| 13 October 1991 Quarter-final | Castlemartyr | 0–06 – 0–05 | Carbery Rangers | Ballinhassig Grounds |

| 13 October 1991 Quarter-final | Knocknagree | 1–10 – 0–06 | Carrigaline | Coachford Grounds |

=== Semi-finals ===
| 20 October 1991 Semi-final | Deel Rovers | 2–11 – 1–10 | Castlemartyr | Castletownroche Grounds |

| 20 October 1991 Semi-final | Knocknagree | 2–05 – 0–11 | Urhan | Ballingeary Grounds |

| 27 October 1991 Semi-final replay | Knocknagree | 0–06 – 0–05 | Urhan | Ballingeary Grounds |

=== Final ===
| 10 November 1991 Final | Knocknagree | 2–07 – 1–08 | Deel Rovers | Kanturk Grounds |
| | D Fitzgerald 2–0, P Mahony 0–3, N O'Connor 0–2 (0–1 free), D O'Connor 0–1, P O'Connor 0–1. | | V Sheehan 1–0, P Madigan 0–3, S O'Gorman 0–3 (0–2 frees), M Fitzgibbon 0–1, P Buckley 0–1. | Referee: J Kelly (Aghinagh) |
