= 1984 Cork Junior A Football Championship =

- Dates: 30 September – 4 November 1984
- Teams: 8
- Champions: Knocknagree (1st title); John C. Horan (captain); John Fintan Daly (manager)
- Runners-up: Mallow; Malachi Nagle (captain); Mick Golden (manager)

Tournament statistics
- Matches played: 7
- Goals scored: 12 (1.71 per match)
- Points scored: 115 (16.43 per match)
- Top scorer(s): Donal Murphy (1–09)

The 1984 Cork Junior A Football Championship was the 86th staging of the Cork Junior A Football Championship since its establishment by Cork County Board in 1895. The championship ran from 30 September to 4 November 1984.

The final was played on 4 November 1984 at Fr Con Buckley Park in Buttevant, between Knocknagree and Mallow, in what was their first ever meeting in the final. Knocknagree won the match by 0–13 to 1–10 to claim their first ever championship title.

Mallow's Donal Murphy was the championship's top scorer with 1–09.

== Qualification ==
Division	Championship	Champions
Avondhu	North Cork Junior A Football Championship	Mallow
Beara	Beara Junior A Football Championship	Adrigole
Carbery	South West Junior A Football Championship	Carbery Rangers
Carrigdhoun	South East Junior A Football Championship	Valley Rovesr
Duhallow	Duhallow Junior A Football Championship	Knocknagree
Imokilly	East Cork Junior A Football Championship	Youghal
Muskerry	Mid Cork Junior A Football Championship	Kilmurry
Seandún	City Junior A Football Championship	St Nicholas'

== Results ==
=== Quarter-finals ===
30 September 1984 Quarter-final	Youghal	1–08 – 0–06	Carbery Rangers	Delanys Grounds
	F Cooper 1–0, R Swaine 0–2, S Gardiner 0–2, M Coyne 0–2, L O'Leary 0–1, T Gibbons 0–1.		T Murphy 0–6.

7 October 1984 Quarter-final	Adrigole	2–06 – 0–03	Valley Rovers	Rossa Park
	S O'Shea 1–1, J O'Neill 1–0, DP O'Sullivan 0–2, C O'Sullivan 0–1, K Green 0–1, T O'Sullivan 0–1.		F Crowley 0–1, TJ Deasy 0–1, G Slyne 0–1.

14 October 1984 Quarter-final	Knocknagree	1–17 – 1–07	St Nicholas'	Coachford Sportsfield
	N O'Connor 0–5, D O'Connor 0–5, P O'Connor 1–0, TJ O'Leary 0–3, D Kelleher 0–2, Denny O'Connor 0–1, D Buckley 0–1.		C Marshall 1–0, J O'Callaghan 0–3, D Whitely 0–2, T Corbett 0–1, D Coughlan 0–1.

14 October 1984 Quarter-final	Mallow	1–10 – 0–06	Kilmurry	Páirc Uí Chaoimh
	M Carroll 1–2, S Brown 0–3, D Murphy 0–2, N O'Connell 0–1, J Hayes 0–1, D O'Donovan 0–1.		S Murphy 0–2, M O'Neill 0–1, M Kelleher 0–1, C Barry-Murphy 0–1, G lally 0–1.

=== Semi-finals ===
21 October 1984 Semi-final	Knocknagree	1–08 – 1–04	Youghal	Moore Park
	D Kelleher 0–5, Donal O'Connor 1–0, N Cronin 0–1, TJ O'Leary 0–1, D Buckley 0–1.		L O'Leary 1–0, M Coyne 0–1, M McCarthy 0–1, T Coyne 0–1, G Cotter 0–1.	Referee: J Dennigan (Fermoy)

28 October 1984 Semi-final	Mallow	1–15 – 2–03	Adrigole	Castle Grounds
	D Murphy 0–5, S Browne 0–4, A Copps 0–4, P O'Sullivan 1–0, J Hayes 0–1, M Carroll 0–1.		K Green 2–2, C O'Sullivan 0–1.

=== Final ===
4 November 1984 Final	Knocknagree	0–13 – 1–09	Mallow	Fr Con Buckley Park
	N O'Connor 0–5, P O'Connor 0–2, Denny O'Connor 0–2, Donal O'Connor 0–1, D Buckley 0–1, D Kelleher 0–1.	Report	D Murphy 1–2, A Copps 0–3, D O'Donovan 0–1, S Brown 0–1, P O'Sullivan 0–1, G Buckley 0–1.	Referee: E Porter (Brian Dillons)

== Championship statistics ==
=== Top scorers ===
Rank	Player	Club	Tally	Total	Matches	Average
1	Donal Murphy	Mallow	1–09	12	3	4.00
2	Niall O'Connor	Knocknagree	0–10	10	3	3.33
3	Kevin Green	Adrigole	2–03	9	1	9.00
3	Donal O'Connor	Knocknagree	1–06	9	3	3.00
5	Seán Browne	Mallow	0–08	8	3	2.66
5	Donal Kelleher	Knocknagree	0–08	8	3	2.66
7	Alan Copps	Mallow	0–07	7	3	3.33
8	Mick Carroll	Mallow	0–07	7	2	3.50
9	Tony Murphy	Carbery Rangers	0–06	6	1	6.00
10	Pat O'Connor	Knocknagree	1–02	5	3	1.66
