= Knocknagree GAA =

Gaelic games club in County Cork, Ireland

Knocknagree
- Cnoc na Graí
- Founded: 1956
- County: Cork
- Colours
- Grounds: Knocknagree GAA Grounds

Playing kits
Standard colours

Senior Club Championships
	All Ireland	Munster champions	Cork champions
Football:	0	0	0

Knocknagree GAA is a Gaelic Athletic Association club in Knocknagree, County Cork, Ireland. The club is affiliated to the Duhallow Board and is exclusively concerned with the game of Gaelic football.

== History ==
Located in the village of Knocknagree, about 5 km north of Rathmore on the Cork–Kerry border, Knocknagree GAA Club was founded in 1956, however, records show Knocknagree teams competing in the 1920s. Many Knocknagree men also lined out with various local clubs in the decades that followed. The club has spent the vast majority of its existence operating in the junior grade.

Knocknagree had its first major success when, in 1966, the Duhallow JAFC title was won for the first time. The club later went on to dominate the divisional championship, with six titles being won in a seven-year period between 1978 and 1984. The last of these titles was converted into a Cork JAFC, following a 0–13 to 1–09 win over Mallow in the final. Knocknagree sent a number of years in the intermediate grade before regrading to the junior ranks once again. Three successive Duhallow JAFC titles were won between 1989 and 1991, with the club claiming a second Cork JAFC title in 1991.

The period between 2017 and 2025 could, arguably, be regarded as Knocknagree's most successful. The club won its third Cork JAFC title in 2017, before ending the year with the Munster Club JFC title. Knocknagree later beat Multyfarnham by 3–13 to 3–09 in the 2018 All-Ireland final. Further successes followed, with the club winning the Cork IFC title in 2019 and the Cork PIFC title in 2020. Knocknagree secured top tier status for the first time in their history when they won the Cork SAFC title in 2025, after a 2–17 to 0–17 win over Cill na Martra.

== Honours ==
- Cork Senior A Football Championship (1): 2025
- Cork Premier Intermediate Football Championship (1): 2020
- Cork Intermediate Football Championship (1): 2019
- All-Ireland Junior Club Football Championship (1): 2018
- Munster Junior Club Football Championship (1): 2017
- Cork Junior A Football Championship (3): 1984, 1991, 2017
- Duhallow Junior A Football Championship (12): 1966, 1978, 1979, 1981, 1982, 1983, 1984, 1989, 1990, 1991, 2015, 2016

== Notable players ==
- John Fintan Daly
- Eoghan McSweeney
- Niall O'Connor
- Daniel O'Mahony
