= Multyfarnham GAA =

Gaelic games club in County Westmeath, Ireland

- Muilte Fearranáin
- Founded: 1935
- County: Westmeath
- Nickname: Multy
- Colours: White and maroon
- Grounds: Gaine Park, Multyfarnham
- Coordinates: 53°37′25″N 7°23′07″W

Playing kits
Standard colours

Multyfarnham GAA is a Gaelic Athletic Association club based in the village of Multyfarnham in the north of County Westmeath. They compete in the Westmeath Intermediate Football Championship. They won the Westmeath Junior Championship in 2022. They won the 2017 Westmeath Junior Championship, and subsequently won the 2017 Leinster Junior Club Football Championship before being runners-up in the 2018 All-Ireland Junior Club Football Championship, losing the final to Knocknagree of Cork. They are the only team from Westmeath to reach this stage.

The club's underage setup fields teams of boys and girls up to the minor (under 18) level.

== Notable players ==
- Ronan Wallace, Westmeath footballer

== Achievements ==
- Leinster Junior Club Football Championship (1) 2017
- Westmeath Junior Club Football Championship (3) 1956, 2017, 2022
