= John Fintan Daly =

Irish football coach

Personal information
- Native name: Seán F. Ó Dálaigh (Irish)
- Nickname: JFD
- Born: 1956 (age 69–70) Knocknagree, County Cork, Ireland
- Occupation: Solicitor

Sport
- Sport: Gaelic football
Club
- Years: Club
- Knocknagree
Club titles
- Cork titles: 0

John Fintan Daly
Sport
Club management
- Years: Club
- Knocknagree; Duhallow; Milltown/Castlemaine
Inter-county management
- Years: Team
- Cork junior football team Cork under-21 football team
Inter-county titles as manager
County	League	Province	All-Ireland
Cork (junior) Cork (U21)	1; 1	1; 1	1; 1

John Fintan Daly (born 1957) is an Irish Gaelic football coach and former player. In a coaching career that has spanned over 40 years, he has enjoyed All-Ireland successes at club and inter-county levels. He has three children, notably John Fintan Daly Jr. (known as ‘JFD’ ‘Finto’ 'Small John' or ‘John F. Junior').

== Management career ==
Daly's playing career with Knocknagree ended prematurely when he suffered a cruciate ligament injury as a 20-year-old, however, he immediately became involved in team management and coaching with the club. Over the course of a 40-year association, he has guided the club to numerous junior divisional championship titles before managing the team to the All-Ireland Club Championship title in 2017. Daly had earlier managed the Milltown/Castlemaine club in Kerry to the All-Ireland Intermediate Championship at intermediate level in 2012. At inter-county level, he has been involved as a selector and coach with various Cork teams. He guided the Cork junior team to the All-Ireland Championship title in 1984, before managing the Cork under-21 team to All-Ireland success a decade later in 1994. Daly's back-to-back County Championship successes with Duhallow in 1990 and 1991 earned him a place as a selector with the Cork senior football team.

== Honours ==
=== Player ===
Knocknagree

- Duhallow Junior A Football Championship: 1978

=== Management ===
Milltown/Castlemaine

- All-Ireland Intermediate Club Football Championship: 2012
- Munster Intermediate Club Football Championship: 2012
- Kerry Intermediate Football Championship: 2011

Knocknagree

- Cork Premier Intermediate Football Championship: 2020
- Cork Intermediate Football Championship: 2019
- All-Ireland Junior Club Football Championship: 2018
- Munster Junior Club Football Championship: 2017
- Cork Junior A Football Championship: 1984, 2017

Duhallow

- Cork Senior Football Championship: 1990, 1991

Cork

- All-Ireland Junior Football Championship: 1984
- Munster Junior Football Championship: 1984
- All-Ireland Under-21 Football Championship: 1994
- Munster Under-21 Football Championship: 1994

Sporting positions
Preceded by Bob Honohan	Cork Under-20 Football Team Manager; 1993-1996	Succeeded by Bob Honohan
Achievements
Preceded by Paul Kenny	All-Ireland Under-21 Football Final winning manager 1994	Succeeded by Páidí Ó Sé
