= Dan Dineen =

Irish Gaelic footballer

Personal information
- Native name: Dan Ó Duinnín (Irish)
- Nickname: Dano
- Born: 1997 (age 28–29) Cill na Martra, Ireland
- Occupation: Quantity surveyor

Sport
- Sport: Gaelic football
- Position: Left corner-forward
Club
- Years: Club
- Cill Na Martra
Club titles
- Cork titles: 0
College
- Years: College
- 2016-2020: Cork Institute of Technology
College titles
- Sigerson titles: 0
Inter-county*
Years	County	Apps (scores)
2021-	Cork	0 (0-00)
Inter-county titles
- Munster titles: 0
- All-Irelands: 0
- NFL: 0
- All Stars: 0
- *Inter County team apps and scores correct as of 21:51, 27 September 2021.

Dan Dineen (born 1997), also known as Dan Ó Duinnín, is an Irish Gaelic footballer. At club he plays with Cill an Martra and at inter-county level with the Cork senior football team. He usually lines out as a forward.

== Honours ==
Colaiste Ghobnatan

- All-Ireland Colleges Senior C Football Championship: 2014

Cill an Martra

- Cork Intermediate Football Championship: 2018

Cork

- Munster Under-21 Football Championship: 2016
