= Fionn Herlihy =

Irish Gaelic footballer

Personal information
- Born: 2000 Dunmanway, County Cork, Ireland
- Occupation: Student

Sport
- Sport: Gaelic Football
- Position: Full-forward
Club
- Years: Club
- 2018-present: Dohenys
Club titles
- Cork titles: 0
College
- Years: College
- 2019-present: University College Cork
College titles
- Sigerson titles: 1
Inter-county*
Years	County	Apps (scores)
2022-present	Cork	0 (0-00)
Inter-county titles
- Munster titles: 0
- All-Irelands: 0
- NFL: 0
- All Stars: 0
- *Inter County team apps and scores correct as of 15:50, 2 July 2023.

Fionn Herlihy (born 2000) is an Irish Gaelic footballer. At club level he plays with Dohenys, while he has also lined out at inter-county level with various Cork teams.

== Career ==
Herlihy first played Gaelic football with the Sam Maguires juvenile team in Dunmanway. He was part of the team that won divisional and Cork MAFC titles in 2017, while also claiming a West Cork U21AFC title that year. Herlihy made his senior team debut for Dohenys in 2018, while he was still a student at Hamilton High School with whom he played both hurling and Gaelic football. He later captained University College Cork to the All-Ireland Freshers' AFC title in 2019.

Herlihy first appeared on the inter-county scene with Cork as a member of the under-17 team that took part in a one-off Munster U17FC in 2017. He progressed to the under-20 team and scored a goal when Cork beat Kerry to win the Munster U20FC title in 2019. Herlihy was an unused substitute for Cork's defeat of Dublin in the 2019 All-Ireland under-20 final.

Herlihy made his senior team debut in 2022.

== Honours ==
University College Cork

- All-Ireland Freshers' A Football Championship: 2019 (c)

Dohenys

- West Cork Under-21 A Football Championship: 2017
- Cork Minor A Football Championship: 2017
- West Cork Minor A Football Championship: 2017

Cork

- All-Ireland Under-20 Football Championship: 2019
- Munster Under-20 Football Championship: 2019
