= Knocknagree =

Village in County Cork, Ireland

Knocknagree Irish: Cnoc na Graí
- Village
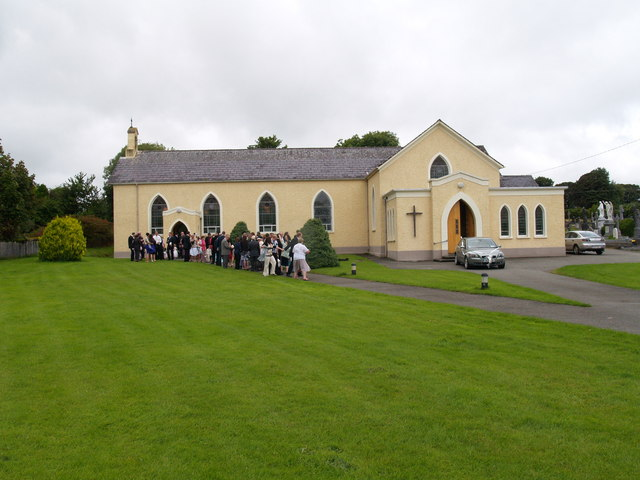
- Knocknagree church

- Location in Ireland
- Coordinates: 52°07′22.33″N 09°12′31.43″W
- Country: Ireland
- Province: Munster
- County: County Cork

Population (2022)
  - Total: 213
- Time zone: UTC+0 (WET)
  - Summer (DST): UTC-1 (IST (WEST))

Knocknagree (Irish: Cnoc na Graí; the hill of the horse stud) is a village in north-west County Cork in Ireland. Located on the R582 (Ballydesmond to Macroom) regional road it is 5 km north of Rathmore. It is approximately one mile from the Cork-Kerry border, and looks south towards the Blackwater River. Across the Blackwater River is Gneeveguilla, one of the nearest villages on the other side of border with County Kerry. Knocknagree is within the Dáil constituency of Cork North-West.

The village had, in 2004 and 2005, seen some redevelopment on the expansive "fairfield" or village green. Before the advent of the modern cattle-mart, this green was the venue of one of the largest livestock markets in Munster. This market died out in the 1970s.

The village is near the southern edge of the area known as Sliabh Luachra.

== History ==
On 7 February 1921, Michael J. Kelleher, aged 14, who while playing with other boys of his own age, ran away on the approach of military lorries and was shot dead. Two other boys, aged 8 and 11 years, were wounded. The eighteenth-century poet Eoghan Rua Ó Súilleabháin died here.

== Notable people ==
- Ned Buckley, poet and publican
- Pat Byrne, (born 1946) former Garda Commissioner
- Donal Herlihy (1908–1983), Roman Catholic bishop in the Diocese of Ferns

== See also ==
- List of towns and villages in Ireland
- Knocknagree GAA
